= List of Ecuadorian records in Olympic weightlifting =

The following are the national records in Olympic weightlifting in Ecuador. Records are maintained in each weight class for the snatch lift, clean and jerk lift, and the total for both lifts by the Federación Ecuatoriana de Levantamiento de Pesas.

== Current records ==
=== Men ===
Event	Record	Athlete	Date	Meet	Place	Ref
60 kg
Snatch	kg					
Clean & Jerk	kg					
Total	kg					
65 kg
Snatch	kg					
Clean & Jerk	kg					
Total	kg					
71 kg
Snatch	kg					
Clean & Jerk	kg					
Total	kg					
79 kg
Snatch	kg					
Clean & Jerk	kg					
Total	kg					
88 kg
Snatch	kg					
Clean & Jerk	kg					
Total	kg					
94 kg
Snatch	kg					
Clean & Jerk	kg					
Total	kg					
110 kg
Snatch	kg					
Clean & Jerk	kg					
Total	kg					
+110 kg
Snatch	kg					
Clean & Jerk	kg					
Total	kg					

=== Women ===
Event	Record	Athlete	Date	Meet	Place	Ref
48 kg
Snatch						
Clean & Jerk						
Total						
53 kg
Snatch						
Clean & Jerk						
Total						
58 kg
Snatch	94 kg	Jenifer Becerra	23 November 2025	Bolivarian Games	Lima, Peru	
Clean & Jerk	115 kg	Jenifer Becerra	23 November 2025	Bolivarian Games	Lima, Peru	
Total	209 kg	Jenifer Becerra	23 November 2025	Bolivarian Games	Lima, Peru	
63 kg
Snatch						
Clean & Jerk						
Total						
69 kg
Snatch						
Clean & Jerk						
Total						
77 kg
Snatch						
Clean & Jerk						
Total						
86 kg
Snatch						
Clean & Jerk						
Total						
+86 kg
Snatch	121 kg	Lisseth Ayoví	30 April 2026	Pan American Championships	Panama City, Panama	
Clean & Jerk	160 kg	Lisseth Ayoví	30 April 2026	Pan American Championships	Panama City, Panama	
Total	281 kg	Lisseth Ayoví	30 April 2026	Pan American Championships	Panama City, Panama	

== Historical records ==
=== Men (2018–2025) ===
Event	Record	Athlete	Date	Meet	Place	Ref
55 kg
Snatch						
Clean & Jerk						
Total						
61 kg
Snatch	125 kg	Cristhian Zurita	27 July 2019	Pan American Games	Lima, Peru	
Clean & Jerk	151 kg	Cristhian Zurita	27 July 2019	Pan American Games	Lima, Peru	
Total	276 kg	Cristhian Zurita	27 July 2019	Pan American Games	Lima, Peru	
67 kg
Snatch	133 kg	Jair Reyes	November 2021	Pan American Championships	Guayaquil, Ecuador	
Clean & Jerk	172 kg	Jair Reyes	10 December 2021	World Championships	Tashkent, Uzbekistan	
Total	302 kg	Jair Reyes	10 December 2021	World Championships	Tashkent, Uzbekistan	
73 kg
Snatch	146 kg	Jair Reyes	10 June 2023	IWF Grand Prix	Havana, Cuba	
Clean & Jerk	180 kg	Jair Reyes	7 December 2023	IWF Grand Prix	Doha, Qatar	
Total	321 kg	Jair Reyes	7 December 2023	IWF Grand Prix	Doha, Qatar	
81 kg
Snatch	152 kg	Iván Escudero	November 2021	Pan American Championships	Guayaquil, Ecuador	
Clean & Jerk	180 kg	Iván Escudero	12 December 2021	World Championships	Tashkent, Uzbekistan	
Total	327 kg	Iván Escudero	12 December 2021	World Championships	Tashkent, Uzbekistan	
89 kg
Snatch	161 kg	Ivan Escudero	14 June 2023	IWF Grand Prix	Havana, Cuba	
Clean & Jerk	199 kg	Ivan Escudero	14 June 2023	IWF Grand Prix	Havana, Cuba	
Total	360 kg	Ivan Escudero	14 June 2023	IWF Grand Prix	Havana, Cuba	
96 kg
Snatch	158 kg	Wilmer Contreras	26 April 2019	Pan American Championships	Guatemala City, Guatemala	
Clean & Jerk	197 kg	Wilmer Contreras	26 April 2019	Pan American Championships	Guatemala City, Guatemala	
Total	355 kg	Wilmer Contreras	26 April 2019	Pan American Championships	Guatemala City, Guatemala	
102 kg
Snatch	155 kg	Paul Ferrin	26 April 2019	Pan American Championships	Guatemala City, Guatemala	
Clean & Jerk	196 kg	Paul Ferrin	26 April 2019	Pan American Championships	Guatemala City, Guatemala	
Total	351 kg	Paul Ferrin	26 April 2019	Pan American Championships	Guatemala City, Guatemala	
109 kg
Snatch	190 kg	Jorge Arroyo	29 July 2019	Pan American Games	Lima, Peru	
Clean & Jerk	195 kg	Jorge Arroyo	29 July 2019	Pan American Games	Lima, Peru	
Total	385 kg	Jorge Arroyo	29 July 2019	Pan American Games	Lima, Peru	
+109 kg
Snatch	180 kg	Dixon Arroyo	November 2021	Pan American Championships	Guayaquil, Ecuador	
Clean & Jerk	206 kg	Fernando Salas	30 July 2019	Pan American Games	Lima, Peru	
Total	384 kg	Fernando Salas	30 July 2019	Pan American Games	Lima, Peru	

=== Women (2018–2025) ===
Event	Record	Athlete	Date	Meet	Place	Ref
45 kg
Snatch	68 kg	Maria Del Cisne Benavides	April 2019	Pan American Championships	Guatemala City, Guatemala	
Clean & Jerk	75 kg	Maria Del Cisne Benavides	April 2019	Pan American Championships	Guatemala City, Guatemala	
Total	143 kg	Maria Del Cisne Benavides	April 2019	Pan American Championships	Guatemala City, Guatemala	
49 kg
Snatch	76 kg	Angélica Campoverde	27 July 2019	Pan American Games	Lima, Peru	
Clean & Jerk	95 kg	Angélica Campoverde	April 2019	Pan American Championships	Guatemala City, Guatemala	
Total	170 kg	Angélica Campoverde	April 2019	Pan American Championships	Guatemala City, Guatemala	
55 kg
Snatch	93 kg	Alexandra Escobar	3 November 2018	World Championships	Ashgabat, Turkmenistan	
Clean & Jerk	116 kg	Alexandra Escobar	3 November 2018	World Championships	Ashgabat, Turkmenistan	
Total	209 kg	Alexandra Escobar	3 November 2018	World Championships	Ashgabat, Turkmenistan	
59 kg
Snatch	97 kg	Alexandra Escobar	28 July 2019	Pan American Games	Lima, Peru	
Clean & Jerk	123 kg	Alexandra Escobar	28 July 2019	Pan American Games	Lima, Peru	
Total	220 kg	Alexandra Escobar	28 July 2019	Pan American Games	Lima, Peru	
64 kg
Snatch	105 kg	Angie Palacios	29 July 2019	Pan American Games	Lima, Peru	
Clean & Jerk	123 kg	Angie Palacios	29 July 2019	Pan American Games	Lima, Peru	
Total	228 kg	Angie Palacios	29 July 2019	Pan American Games	Lima, Peru	
71 kg
Snatch	121 kg	Angie Palacios	14 June 2023	IWF Grand Prix	Havana, Cuba	
Clean & Jerk	140 kg	Angie Palacios	14 June 2023	IWF Grand Prix	Havana, Cuba	
Total	261 kg	Angie Palacios	14 June 2023	IWF Grand Prix	Havana, Cuba	
76 kg
Snatch	118 kg	Neisi Dájomes	13 May 2021	Ibero-American Championships	Cali, Colombia	
Clean & Jerk	145 kg	Neisi Dájomes	1 August 2021	Olympic Games	Tokyo, Japan	
Total	263 kg	Neisi Dájomes	1 August 2021	Olympic Games	Tokyo, Japan	
81 kg
Snatch	123 kg	Neisi Dájomes	9 April 2024	World Cup	Phuket, Thailand	
Clean & Jerk	149 kg	Tamara Salazar	16 June 2023	IWF Grand Prix	Havana, Cuba	
Total	269 kg	Neisi Dájomes	9 April 2024	World Cup	Phuket, Thailand	
87 kg
Snatch	113 kg	Tamara Salazar	2 August 2021	Olympic Games	Tokyo, Japan	
Clean & Jerk	150 kg	Tamara Salazar	2 August 2021	Olympic Games	Tokyo, Japan	
Total	263 kg	Tamara Salazar	2 August 2021	Olympic Games	Tokyo, Japan	
+87 kg
Snatch	121 kg	Lisseth Ayovi	16 September 2023	World Championships	Riyadh, Saudi Arabia	
Clean & Jerk	155 kg	Lisseth Ayovi	16 September 2023	World Championships	Riyadh, Saudi Arabia	
Total	276 kg	Lisseth Ayovi	16 September 2023	World Championships	Riyadh, Saudi Arabia	
