= 2022 World Weightlifting Championships – Women's 81 kg =

Weightlifting competition

The women's 81 kilograms competition at the 2022 World Weightlifting Championships was held on 14 December 2022.

== Schedule ==
| Date | Time | Event |
|---|---|---|
| 14 December 2022 | 11:30 | Group C |
| 14 December 2022 | 14:00 | Group B |
| 14 December 2022 | 16:30 | Group A |

== Medalists ==
| Event | Gold | | Silver | | Bronze | |
|---|---|---|---|---|---|---|
| Snatch | Iryna Dekha (UKR) | 122 kg | Alina Marushchak (UKR) | 119 kg | Liang Xiaomei (CHN) | 118 kg |
| Clean & Jerk | Liang Xiaomei (CHN) | 152 kg | Wang Zhouyu (CHN) | 151 kg | Tamara Salazar (ECU) | 148 kg |
| Total | Liang Xiaomei (CHN) | 270 kg | Wang Zhouyu (CHN) | 266 kg | Tamara Salazar (ECU) | 262 kg |

== Records ==
Prior to this competition, the existing world records were as follows.

| World record | Snatch | World Standard | 127 kg | — | 1 November 2018 |
| World record | Clean & Jerk | World Standard | 158 kg | — | 1 November 2018 |
| World record | Total | World Standard | 283 kg | — | 1 November 2018 |

== Results ==
| Rank | Athlete | Group | Snatch (kg) | | | | Clean & Jerk (kg) | | | | Total |
| Rank | Athlete | Group | 1 | 2 | 3 | Rank | 1 | 2 | 3 | Rank | Total |
|---|---|---|---|---|---|---|---|---|---|---|---|
| 1st place, gold medalist(s) | Liang Xiaomei (CHN) | A | 113 | 118 | ~~120~~ | 3rd place, bronze medalist(s) | 147 | 152 | ~~159~~ | 1st place, gold medalist(s) | 270 |
| 2nd place, silver medalist(s) | Wang Zhouyu (CHN) | A | ~~115~~ | 115 | ~~121~~ | 5 | 141 | 148 | 151 | 2nd place, silver medalist(s) | 266 |
| 3rd place, bronze medalist(s) | Tamara Salazar (ECU) | A | 110 | 114 | ~~116~~ | 6 | 145 | 148 | ~~151~~ | 3rd place, bronze medalist(s) | 262 |
| 4 | Iryna Dekha (UKR) | A | 117 | 120 | 122 | 1st place, gold medalist(s) | 138 | ~~142~~ | ~~142~~ | 6 | 260 |
| 5 | Neisi Dájomes (ECU) | A | ~~116~~ | ~~116~~ | 117 | 4 | 141 | ~~145~~ | ~~146~~ | 5 | 258 |
| 6 | Alina Marushchak (UKR) | A | 116 | 119 | ~~121~~ | 2nd place, silver medalist(s) | 137 | ~~142~~ | ~~142~~ | 7 | 256 |
| 7 | Ayamey Medina (CUB) | A | ~~106~~ | 106 | 111 | 7 | 136 | 142 | ~~148~~ | 4 | 253 |
| 8 | Laura Amaro (BRA) | A | ~~106~~ | ~~110~~ | 110 | 8 | ~~136~~ | ~~136~~ | 137 | 8 | 247 |
| 9 | Dayana Chirinos (VEN) | A | 105 | 108 | ~~111~~ | 9 | 136 | ~~140~~ | ~~140~~ | 10 | 244 |
| 10 | Yudelina Mejía (DOM) | A | 107 | ~~112~~ | ~~112~~ | 10 | 136 | ~~141~~ | ~~142~~ | 9 | 243 |
| 11 | Liana Gyurjyan (ARM) | B | 95 | 100 | 103 | 13 | 125 | 130 | 134 | 11 | 237 |
| 12 | Kristel Ngarlem (CAN) | B | 98 | ~~102~~ | ~~102~~ | 19 | 127 | 133 | ~~136~~ | 12 | 231 |
| 13 | Dilara Narin (TUR) | B | 97 | 100 | 103 | 14 | 127 | ~~131~~ | ~~132~~ | 14 | 230 |
| 14 | Maya Laylor (CAN) | B | ~~102~~ | 102 | ~~104~~ | 16 | 122 | 125 | 128 | 13 | 230 |
| 15 | Elham Hosseini (IRI) | B | 98 | ~~102~~ | 104 | 12 | ~~121~~ | 122 | ~~127~~ | 16 | 226 |
| 16 | Haruko Yamasaki (JPN) | B | ~~94~~ | 94 | 99 | 18 | 120 | 126 | ~~128~~ | 15 | 225 |
| 17 | Nina Schroth (GER) | B | 100 | ~~103~~ | 103 | 15 | 118 | ~~121~~ | ~~123~~ | 18 | 221 |
| 18 | Rigina Adashbaeva (UZB) | B | 95 | 98 | 100 | 17 | 116 | 120 | ~~122~~ | 17 | 220 |
| 19 | Anamjan Rustamowa (TKM) | B | 93 | 96 | 98 | 20 | 115 | ~~120~~ | ~~120~~ | 21 | 213 |
| 20 | Aisha Omarova (KAZ) | C | 93 | 96 | ~~98~~ | 21 | 115 | — | — | 20 | 211 |
| 21 | Ida Rönn (SWE) | C | 94 | ~~97~~ | ~~97~~ | 22 | ~~117~~ | ~~117~~ | 117 | 19 | 211 |
| 22 | Rayen Cupid (VIN) | C | 77 | 81 | ~~85~~ | 23 | 93 | 99 | ~~104~~ | 22 | 180 |
| — | Lee Min-ji (KOR) | A | 100 | 105 | 107 | 11 | ~~136~~ | ~~136~~ | ~~137~~ | — | — |
| — | Aremi Fuentes (MEX) | B | Did not start | | | | | | | | |
| — | Jeanne Eyenga (CMR) | C | Did not start | | | | | | | | |
