= 2023 World Weightlifting Championships – Women's 81 kg =

Competitive strength sport championship for women - 81 kg

The women's 81 kilograms competition at the 2023 World Weightlifting Championships was held on 14 and 15 September 2023.

== Schedule ==
Date	Time	Event
14 September 2023	21:30	Group C
15 September 2023	11:30	Group B
15 September 2023	16:30	Group A

== Medalists ==
Event	Gold		Silver		Bronze	
Snatch	Wang Zhouyu (CHN)	122 kg	Liang Xiaomei (CHN)	122 kg	Neisi Dájomes (ECU)	115 kg
Clean & Jerk	Liang Xiaomei (CHN)	159 kg	Wang Zhouyu (CHN)	155 kg	Eileen Cikamatana (AUS)	146 kg
Total	Liang Xiaomei (CHN)	281 kg	Wang Zhouyu (CHN)	277 kg	Eileen Cikamatana (AUS)	256 kg

== Records ==
Prior to this competition, the existing world records were as follows.

World record	Snatch	World Standard	127 kg	—	1 November 2018
World record	Clean & Jerk	World Standard	158 kg	—	1 November 2018
World record	Total	World Standard	283 kg	—	1 November 2018

== Results ==
Rank	Athlete	Group	Snatch (kg)				Clean & Jerk (kg)				Total
Rank	Athlete	Group	1	2	3	Rank	1	2	3	Rank	Total
1st place, gold medalist(s)	Liang Xiaomei (CHN)	A	115	120	122	2nd place, silver medalist(s)	150	156	159 CWR	1st place, gold medalist(s)	281
2nd place, silver medalist(s)	Wang Zhouyu (CHN)	A	117	122	~~124~~	1st place, gold medalist(s)	147	155	-	2nd place, silver medalist(s)	277
3rd place, bronze medalist(s)	Eileen Cikamatana (AUS)	A	~~110~~	110	~~115~~	5	143	146	~~150~~	3rd place, bronze medalist(s)	256
4	Mattie Rogers (USA)	A	110	112	~~115~~	4	140	~~143~~	~~143~~	4	252
5	Laura Amaro (BRA)	A	108	~~112~~	~~112~~	7	133	~~138~~	~~140~~	5	241
6	Weronika Zielińska-Stubińska (POL)	B	103	~~106~~	107	8	130	~~134~~	~~134~~	6	237
7	Elena Erighina (MDA)	A	103	107	~~109~~	9	~~128~~	128	~~131~~	10	235
8	Maya Laylor (CAN)	A	~~102~~	102	~~105~~	11	~~130~~	~~130~~	130	8	232
9	Wakana Nagashima (JPN)	B	~~100~~	100	~~105~~	14	130	~~136~~	~~136~~	7	230
10	Nikki Löwik (NED)	B	~~100~~	~~103~~	103	10	125	~~130~~	~~130~~	15	228
11	Aremi Fuentes (MEX)	B	~~99~~	~~99~~	99	18	122	127	~~130~~	13	226
12	Katrina Feklistova (GBR)	C	96	99	~~102~~	16	117	121	126	14	225
13	Liana Gyurjyan (ARM)	B	93	~~96~~	96	22	127	~~130~~	~~130~~	12	223
14	Sara Yenigün (TUR)	B	95	~~100~~	~~100~~	23	125	~~128~~	128	9	223
15	Elham Hosseini (IRI)	B	96	~~101~~	~~103~~	21	~~123~~	125	~~130~~	16	221
16	Kim I-seul (KOR)	B	99	~~103~~	~~103~~	17	~~120~~	120	~~125~~	18	219
17	Aisha Omarova (KAZ)	C	90	93	96	20	115	120	~~125~~	17	216
18	Ida Rönn (SWE)	B	~~95~~	~~95~~	95	24	~~120~~	~~120~~	120	19	215
19	Darya Kheidzer (AIN)	C	~~94~~	94	97	19	110	~~115~~	115	22	212
20	Dayana Chirinos (VEN)	C	75	85	~~90~~	29	110	120	127	11	212
21	Jeanne Eyenga (CMR)	C	~~88~~	88	~~92~~	28	~~116~~	119	~~125~~	20	207
22	Eliise Peterson (EST)	C	88	91	~~93~~	26	107	~~111~~	—	23	198
23	Fatemah Al-Buloushi (KUW)	C	61	65	67	30	81	~~86~~	~~88~~	24	148
24	Nujud Khormi (KSA)	C	60	~~65~~	66	31	80	~~85~~	~~86~~	25	146
25	Fahd Naji Hanan (YEM)	C	55	60	~~63~~	32	70	75	78	26	138
—	Neisi Dájomes (ECU)	A	115	~~118~~	~~120~~	3rd place, bronze medalist(s)	—	—	—	—	—
—	Yudelina Mejía (DOM)	A	~~105~~	105	110	6	~~130~~	~~130~~	~~130~~	—	—
—	Siriyakorn Khaipandung (THA)	B	93	—	—	25	—	—	—	—	—
—	Mönkhjantsangiin Ankhtsetseg (MGL)	B	90	—	—	27	—	—	—	—	—
—	Motoka Nakajima (JPN)	B	~~100~~	~~100~~	100	15	~~125~~	~~125~~	~~136~~	—	—
—	Anamjan Rustamowa (TKM)	B	101	~~104~~	~~104~~	12	~~125~~	—	—	—	—
—	Rosalie Dumas (CAN)	B	101	~~106~~	~~107~~	13	—	—	—	—	—
—	Hayley Whiting (NZL)	C	~~94~~	~~94~~	~~94~~	—	~~114~~	~~114~~	115	21	—
—	Tamara Salazar (ECU)	A	—	—	—	—	—	—	—	—	—
—	Ayamey Medina (CUB)	C	—	—	—	—	—	—	—	—	—
—	Clémentine Meukeugni (WRT)	C	Did not start								
—	Parisa Noorali (IRI)	C	Did not start								
