= Neisi Dájomes =

Ecuadorian weightlifter (born 1998)

Neisi Patricia Dájomes Barrera
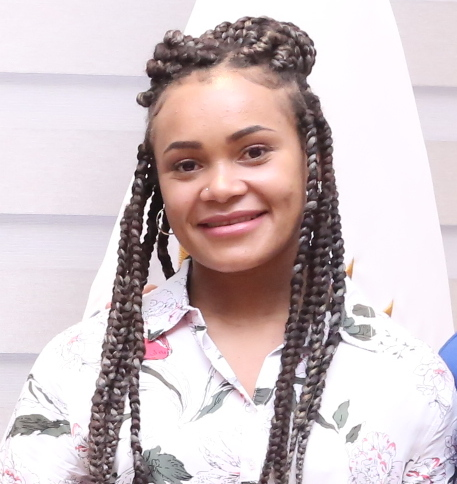
- Dajomes in 2021

Personal information
- Born: 12 May 1998 (age 28) Shell, Ecuador
- Height: 1.67 m (5 ft 6 in)
- Weight: 75.80 kg (167 lb)

Sport
- Country: Ecuador
- Sport: Weightlifting
- Event: –76 kg
- Coached by: Mayra Hoyos

Achievements and titles
- Personal bests: Snatch: 118 kg (2021); Clean and jerk: 145 kg (2021); Total: 263 kg (2021)
Medal record
Representing Ecuador
Women's weightlifting
Olympic Games
Gold medal – first place	2020 Tokyo	–76 kg
Bronze medal – third place	2024 Paris	–81 kg
World Championships
Silver medal – second place	2017 Anaheim	–75 kg
Bronze medal – third place	2018 Ashgabat	–76 kg
Bronze medal – third place	2019 Pattaya	–76 kg
Pan American Games
Gold medal – first place	2019 Lima	–76 kg
Silver medal – second place	2015 Toronto	–69 kg
Pan American Championships
Gold medal – first place	2017 Miami	–75 kg
Gold medal – first place	2018 Santo Domingo	–75 kg
Gold medal – first place	2019 Guatemala City	–76 kg
Gold medal – first place	2022 Bogotá	–81 kg
Gold medal – first place	2023 Bariloche	–81 kg
Gold medal – first place	2024 Caracas	–81 kg
South American Games
Gold medal – first place	2018 Cochabamba	–75 kg
Gold medal – first place	2022 Asunción	–87 kg
Junior World Championships
Gold medal – first place	2016 Tbilisi	–69 kg
Gold medal – first place	2017 Tokyo	–75 kg
Gold medal – first place	2018 Tashkent	–75 kg

Neisi Patricia Dájomes Barrera (born 12 May 1998) is an Ecuadorian weightlifter, who is the 2020 Tokyo 76 kg Olympic Champion, a 6-time Pan American Champion, Pan American Games Champion and a 3-time Junior World Champion. As of 2024, she is the only female Ecuadorian athlete to win multiple Olympic medals. She competed in the 75 kg category until 2018 and 76 kg starting in 2018 after the International Weightlifting Federation reorganized the categories. She is the older sister of the 2023 Pan American champion and Olympic medalist weightlifter Angie Palacios.

As of 2 June 2025, Dajomes has been suspended for 14 months after testing positive for clomifene metabolite.

== Career ==
Dajomes competed in the women's 69 kg event at the 2016 Summer Olympics, finishing seventh overall.

She became junior world champion in 2017 in the 75 kg division, and defended her title in 2018. She won a silver medal at the 2017 World Championships in the 75 kg division, and a bronze medal at the 2018 World Weightlifting Championships in the 76 kg. At the 2018 World Weightlifting Championships she set junior world records in the snatch, clean & jerk and total.

In April 2019 she competed at the 2019 Pan American Weightlifting Championships winning gold medals in the snatch, clean & jerk and the total. Later in 2019 she competed at the 2019 Pan American Games in the 76 kg division. In the snatch portion of the competition she lifted 115 kg with her third, and final lift. She led Aremi Fuentes by a full 5 kg when the clean & jerk portion began, and lifted 140 kg with her final lift and clinched the gold medal.

Dajomes was the gold medalist in the women's 76 kg event at the 2020 Summer Olympics in Tokyo, Japan.

She won the gold medal in the women's 81 kg event at the 2022 Pan American Weightlifting Championships held in Bogotá, Colombia. She also won the gold medals in the Snatch and Clean & Jerk events in this competition. She won two gold medals at the 2022 Bolivarian Games held in Valledupar, Colombia. She won the gold medal in her event at the 2022 South American Games held in Asunción, Paraguay.

Dajomes won the gold medal in the women's 81 kg event at the 2023 Pan American Weightlifting Championships held in Bariloche, Argentina. In 2024, she won the gold medal in her event at the Pan American Weightlifting Championships held in Caracas, Venezuela.

In 2021 she was part of a biographical documentary of her and her weightlifting teammates, Angie Dajomes and Tamara Salazar, with Retrogusto Films Inc. called Shell: Land of Champions.

In 2022, it was announced that another production from the same studio was in the making, with a documentary film of her life called Neisi: The Power of a Dream. It is expected to be released in November 2023.

On 6 June 2024, the Ecuadorian National Olympic Committee, named her and the Ecuadorian olympic walker Brian Pintado as the official flag bearers for the opening ceremony of the Paris 2024 Olympic Games, however was the dressage rider Julio Mendoza Loor, who was the partner in carry the flag in the opening ceremony, replacing to Pintado. In August 2024, she competed in the women's 81 kg event. She was leading after the Snatch with a 122 kg lift and went down to the third place after the Clean & Jerk with a total of 267 kg.

In 2025, Ecuadorian weightlifter Neisi Patricia Dajomes Barrera was sanctioned after testing positive for the prohibited substance clomifene in an out-of-competition sample collected on 7 April 2025. The International Testing Agency (ITA), acting on behalf of the International Weightlifting Federation (IWF), imposed a 14-month period of ineligibility from 2 June 2025 to 1 August 2026. Her competitive results from 7 April 2025 onward were disqualified.

Researchers at the Pontificia Universidad Católica del Ecuador named a newly discovered species of glass frog, the Dajomes glass frog, in her honour. It was found in the El Quimi Nature Reserve in Ecuador.

== Achievements ==
Year	Venue	Weight	Snatch (kg)				Clean & Jerk (kg)				Total	Rank
Year	Venue	Weight	1	2	3	Rank	1	2	3	Rank	Total	Rank
Olympic Games
2016	Rio de Janeiro, Brazil	69 kg	100	104	107	—N/a	130	~~135~~	~~135~~	—N/a	237	7
2020	Tokyo, Japan	76 kg	111	115	118	—N/a	135	140	145	—N/a	263	1st place, gold medalist(s)
2024	Paris, France	81 kg	~~118~~	118	122	—N/a	~~145~~	145	~~151~~	—N/a	267	3rd place, bronze medalist(s)
World Championships
2015	Houston, United States	69 kg	98	~~102~~	103	9	125	130	~~132~~	10	233	10
2017	Anaheim, United States	75 kg	103	106	108	2nd place, silver medalist(s)	128	132	~~135~~	3rd place, bronze medalist(s)	240	2nd place, silver medalist(s)
2018	Ashgabat, Turkmenistan	76 kg	110	115	117	3rd place, bronze medalist(s)	137	142	~~146~~	4	259	3rd place, bronze medalist(s)
2019	Pattaya, Thailand	76 kg	110	~~115~~	~~116~~	3rd place, bronze medalist(s)	135	~~139~~	~~139~~	4	245	3rd place, bronze medalist(s)
2022	Bogotá, Colombia	81 kg	~~116~~	~~116~~	117	4	141	~~145~~	~~146~~	5	258	5
2023	Riyadh, Saudi Arabia	81 kg	115	~~118~~	~~120~~	3rd place, bronze medalist(s)	—	—	—	—	—	—
IWF World Cup
2024	Phuket, Thailand	81 kg	118	121	123	1st place, gold medalist(s)	143	146	—	3rd place, bronze medalist(s)	269	1st place, gold medalist(s)
Pan American Games
2015	Toronto, Canada	69 kg	~~98~~	98	100	—N/a	121	123	125	—N/a	225	2nd place, silver medalist(s)
2019	Lima, Peru	76 kg	109	112	115	—N/a	~~135~~	135	140	—N/a	255	1st place, gold medalist(s)
Pan American Championships
2017	Miami, United States	75 kg	103	107	110	1st place, gold medalist(s)	128	131	~~140~~	1st place, gold medalist(s)	241	1st place, gold medalist(s)
2018	Santo Domingo, Dominican Republic	75 kg	107	111	~~114~~	1st place, gold medalist(s)	132	137	~~140~~	1st place, gold medalist(s)	248	1st place, gold medalist(s)
2019	Guatemala City, Guatemala	76 kg	104	108	109	1st place, gold medalist(s)	131	136	—	1st place, gold medalist(s)	245	1st place, gold medalist(s)
2022	Bogotá, Colombia	81 kg	113	117	120	1st place, gold medalist(s)	138	~~143~~	143	1st place, gold medalist(s)	263	1st place, gold medalist(s)
2023	Bariloche, Argentina	81 kg	106	111	115	1st place, gold medalist(s)	136	141	~~145~~	2nd place, silver medalist(s)	256	1st place, gold medalist(s)
2024	Caracas, Venezuela	81 kg	115	118	121	1st place, gold medalist(s)	~~141~~	141	~~146~~	1st place, gold medalist(s)	262	1st place, gold medalist(s)
Junior World Championships
2016	Tbilisi, Georgia	69 kg	99	103	105	1st place, gold medalist(s)	123	125	—	1st place, gold medalist(s)	230	1st place, gold medalist(s)
2017	Tokyo, Japan	75 kg	103	106	108	1st place, gold medalist(s)	128	~~134~~	134	1st place, gold medalist(s)	242	1st place, gold medalist(s)
2018	Tashkent, Uzbekistan	75 kg	105	110	115	1st place, gold medalist(s)	128	134	140	1st place, gold medalist(s)	255	1st place, gold medalist(s)

Olympic Games
Preceded by Sarah Escobar	Flagbearer for Ecuador; Paris 2024; With: Julio Mendoza Loor	Succeeded by Incumbent
