= Weightlifting at the 2023 Pan American Games – Women's 81 kg =

Weightlifting – Women's 81kg at the 2023 Pan American Games
- Venue: Gimnasio Chimkowe
- Dates: 23 October
- Competitors: 13 from 12 nations

Medalists
Gold medal	Olivia Reeves	United States
Silver medal	Yudelina Mejía	Dominican Republic
Bronze medal	Laura Amaro	Brazil

The women's 81 kg competition of the weightlifting events at the 2023 Pan American Games in Santiago, Chile, was held on 23 October at the Gimnasio Chimkowe.

Each lifter performed in both the snatch and clean and jerk lifts, with the final score being the sum of the lifter's best result in each. The athlete received three attempts in each of the two lifts; the score for the lift was the heaviest weight successfully lifted. This weightlifting event was limited to competitors with a maximum of 81 kilograms of body mass.

== Results ==
The results were as follows:

Rank	Athlete	Nation	Group	Snatch (kg)				Clean & Jerk (kg)				Total
Rank	Athlete	Nation	Group	1	2	3	Result	1	2	3	Result	Total
1st place, gold medalist(s)	Olivia Reeves	United States	A	106	111	114	114	136	140	144	144	258
2nd place, silver medalist(s)	Yudelina Mejía	Dominican Republic	A	107	111	~~114~~	111	130	133	~~144~~	133	244
3rd place, bronze medalist(s)	Laura Amaro	Brazil	A	105	110	~~112~~	110	~~131~~	132	~~135~~	132	242
4	Maya Laylor	Canada	A	~~102~~	~~102~~	102	102	132	135	~~141~~	135	237
5	Shacasia Johnson	United States	A	~~100~~	100	104	104	120	125	130	130	234
6	Lizbeth Nolasco	Mexico	A	100	~~105~~	105	105	120	125	127	127	232
7	Dayana Chirinos	Venezuela	A	96	99	~~101~~	99	127	132	~~136~~	132	231
8	Hellen Escobar	Colombia	A	97	~~101~~	101	101	123	127	~~131~~	127	228
9	María Fernanda Valdés	Chile	A	100	~~103~~	~~103~~	100	125	~~130~~	~~130~~	125	225
10	Ayamey Medina	Cuba	A	75	80	85	85	100	108	112	112	197
11	Eugenia Berger	Uruguay	A	76	79	~~81~~	79	102	~~106~~	~~106~~	102	181
12	Beverly Cardoza	Independent Athletes Team	A	70	74	76	76	92	98	~~101~~	98	174
	Tamara Salazar	Ecuador	A	–	–	–	–					DNS
