= Naryury Pérez =

Venezuelan weightlifter (born 1992)

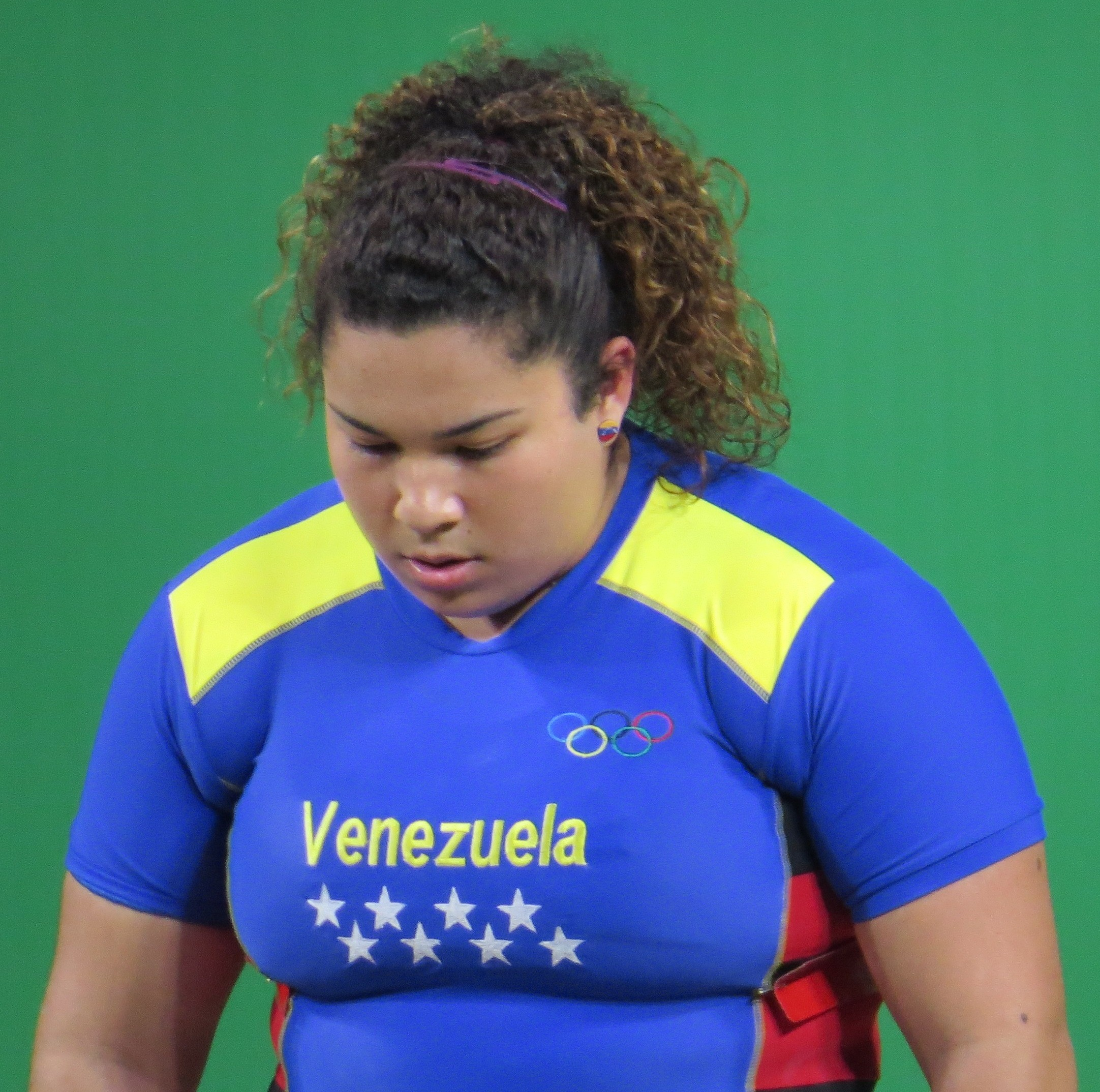
- Pérez at the 2016 Olympics

Personal information
- Born: 29 September 1992 (age 33) San Felipe, Venezuela
- Height: 168 cm (5 ft 6 in)
- Weight: 100 kg (220 lb)

Sport
- Sport: Weightlifting
- Coached by: Jorge Rivero
Medal record
Women's weightlifting
Representing Venezuela
Pan American Games
| Silver medal – second place | 2015 Toronto | +75 kg |
Pan American Championships
| Silver medal – second place | 2024 Caracas | +87 kg |
| Bronze medal – third place | 2012 Antigua Guatemala | +75 kg |
| Bronze medal – third place | 2013 Margarita Island | +75 kg |
| Bronze medal – third place | 2014 Santo Domingo | +75 kg |
| Bronze medal – third place | 2018 Santo Domingo | 90 kg |
| Bronze medal – third place | 2023 Bariloche | +87 kg |
| Bronze medal – third place | 2025 Cali | +86 kg |

Naryury Alexandra Pérez Reveron (born 29 September 1992) is a Venezuelan weightlifter who competes in the +75 kg division from Yaracuy.

== Career ==
She won bronze medals at the 2013 and 2014 Pan American Championships and a silver medal at the 2015 Pan American Games. In 2015, she was named Most Outstanding Athlete of the Year by the Institute of Sport Yaracuy and regional sports journalists.

She failed all clean and jerk attempts at the 2016 Olympics and hence did not finish.

In February 2024, she won the silver medal in the women's +87 kg event at the Pan American Weightlifting Championships held in Caracas, Venezuela. In August 2024, she finished in 8th place in the women's +81 kg event at the 2024 Summer Olympics held in Paris, France.

== Major results ==
| Year | Venue | Weight | Snatch (kg) | | | | Clean & Jerk (kg) | | | | Total | Rank |
| Year | Venue | Weight | 1 | 2 | 3 | Rank | 1 | 2 | 3 | Rank | Total | Rank |
Summer Olympics
| 2016 | Rio de Janeiro, Brazil | +75 kg | 110 | 115 | 117 | —N/a | ~~145~~ | ~~145~~ | ~~145~~ | —N/a | DNF | — |
| 2020 | Tokyo, Japan | 87 kg | 105 | 109 | 112 | —N/a | 130 | ~~137~~ | ~~138~~ | —N/a | 242 | 7 |
| 2024 | Paris, France | +81 kg | 114 | ~~117~~ | ~~117~~ | —N/a | ~~140~~ | 145 | — | —N/a | 259 | 8 |
World Championships
| 2013 | Wrocław, Poland | +75 kg | 103 | 106 | 109 | 7 | 135 | 140 | 142 | 4 | 251 | 5 |
| 2014 | Almaty, Kazakhstan | +75 kg | 103 | ~~110~~ | ~~110~~ | 18 | 135 | 140 | 145 | 7 | 248 | 10 |
| 2015 | Houston, United States | +75 kg | 108 | 112 | 115 | 15 | 141 | 146 | 149 | 10 | 264 | 11 |
| 2018 | Ashgabat, Turkmenistan | 87 kg | 105 | 109 | 111 | 4 | 133 | ~~138~~ | 138 | 4 | 249 | 5 |
| 2019 | Pattaya, Thailand | 87 kg | 107 | 110 | ~~111~~ | 3rd place, bronze medalist(s) | 135 | 140 | ~~143~~ | 5 | 250 | 5 |
| 2022 | Bogotá, Colombia | +87 kg | 110 | 114 | ~~116~~ | 11 | ~~135~~ | 135 | 141 | 11 | 255 | 12 |
| 2023 | Riyadh, Saudi Arabia | +87 kg | 95 | 100 | 105 | 13 | 120 | 130 | 135 | 13 | 240 | 12 |
IWF World Cup
| 2024 | Phuket, Thailand | +87 kg | 114 | 117 | 119 | 6 | 143 | 148 | ~~151~~ | 8 | 267 | 6 |
Pan American Games
| 2015 | Toronto, Canada | +75 kg | 105 | 110 | 112 | —N/a | 142 | 146 | ~~151~~ | —N/a | 258 | 2nd place, silver medalist(s) |
| 2019 | Lima, Peru | 87 kg | 107 | 110 | 112 | —N/a | 135 | 140 | ~~140~~ | —N/a | 252 | 4 |
| 2023 | Santiago, Chile | +81 kg | 108 | 112 | 115 | —N/a | 143 | 148 | ~~153~~ | —N/a | 263 | 5 |
Pan American Championships
| 2012 | Antigua Guatemala, Guatemala | +75 kg | ~~101~~ | 101 | 104 | 4 | 130 | 135 | ~~138~~ | 3rd place, bronze medalist(s) | 239 | 3rd place, bronze medalist(s) |
| 2013 | Margarita Island, Venezuela | +75 kg | 101 | 106 | ~~108~~ | 3rd place, bronze medalist(s) | 132 | 136 | 139 | 2nd place, silver medalist(s) | 245 | 3rd place, bronze medalist(s) |
| 2014 | Santo Domingo, Dominican Republic | +75 kg | 100 | ~~105~~ | 105 | 4 | 135 | ~~140~~ | 145 | 1st place, gold medalist(s) | 245 | 3rd place, bronze medalist(s) |
| 2017 | Miami, United States | 90 kg | 103 | 108 | ~~112~~ | 5 | 133 | ~~137~~ | ~~137~~ | 3rd place, bronze medalist(s) | 241 | 4 |
| 2018 | Santo Domingo, Dominican Republic | 90 kg | 105 | ~~109~~ | 109 | 3rd place, bronze medalist(s) | 130 | 135 | ~~140~~ | 3rd place, bronze medalist(s) | 244 | 3rd place, bronze medalist(s) |
| 2020 | Santo Domingo, Dominican Republic | 87 kg | ~~106~~ | 106 | 110 | 3rd place, bronze medalist(s) | ~~135~~ | ~~135~~ | ~~138~~ | — | — | — |
| 2023 | Bariloche, Argentina | +87 kg | 105 | 108 | 111 | 3rd place, bronze medalist(s) | 136 | 140 | 145 | 4 | 256 | 3rd place, bronze medalist(s) |
| 2024 | Caracas, Venezuela | +87 kg | 111 | 114 | 117 | 2nd place, silver medalist(s) | 144 | 148 | ~~152~~ | 2nd place, silver medalist(s) | 265 | 2nd place, silver medalist(s) |
| 2025 | Cali, Colombia | +86 kg | 111 | 115 | ~~119~~ | 4 | 140 | 146 | 150 | 3rd place, bronze medalist(s) | 265 | 3rd place, bronze medalist(s) |
