= 2018 World Weightlifting Championships – Women's 76 kg =

The women's 76 kg competition at the 2018 World Weightlifting Championships was held on 7 November 2018.

== Schedule ==
Date	Time	Event
7 November 2018	14:25	Group B
7 November 2018	19:55	Group A

== Medalists ==
Event	Gold		Silver		Bronze	
Snatch	Rim Jong-sim (PRK)	119 kg	Wang Zhouyu (CHN)	118 kg	Neisi Dájomes (ECU)	117 kg
Clean & Jerk	Wang Zhouyu (CHN)	152 kg	Rim Jong-sim (PRK)	150 kg	Leydi Solís (COL)	146 kg
Total	Wang Zhouyu (CHN)	270 kg	Rim Jong-sim (PRK)	269 kg	Neisi Dájomes (ECU)	259 kg

== Records ==
Prior to this competition, the existing world records were as follows.

World record	Snatch	World Standard	122 kg	—	1 November 2018
World record	Clean & Jerk	World Standard	153 kg	—	1 November 2018
World record	Total	World Standard	272 kg	—	1 November 2018

== Results ==
Rank	Athlete	Group	Snatch (kg)				Clean & Jerk (kg)				Total
Rank	Athlete	Group	1	2	3	Rank	1	2	3	Rank	Total
1st place, gold medalist(s)	Wang Zhouyu (CHN)	A	113	118	~~122~~	2nd place, silver medalist(s)	140	146	152	1st place, gold medalist(s)	270
2nd place, silver medalist(s)	Rim Jong-sim (PRK)	A	115	119	~~121~~	1st place, gold medalist(s)	145	150	~~153~~	2nd place, silver medalist(s)	269
3rd place, bronze medalist(s)	Neisi Dájomes (ECU)	A	111	115	117	3rd place, bronze medalist(s)	137	142	~~146~~	4	259
4	Leydi Solís (COL)	A	~~110~~	110	~~115~~	5	142	146	~~150~~	3rd place, bronze medalist(s)	256
5	Aremi Fuentes (MEX)	A	110	~~115~~	~~116~~	4	132	~~137~~	137	5	247
6	Gaëlle Nayo-Ketchanke (FRA)	A	101	105	107	6	130	136	~~138~~	6	243
7	Ayumi Kamiya (JPN)	A	100	102	104	7	118	~~121~~	121	9	225
8	Kristel Ngarlem (CAN)	A	~~95~~	95	~~100~~	11	120	124	128	7	223
9	Marie-Ève Beauchemin-Nadeau (CAN)	A	92	96	~~98~~	9	120	124	~~127~~	8	220
10	Małgorzata Wiejak (POL)	A	97	~~99~~	~~100~~	8	117	~~120~~	~~120~~	13	214
11	Tabea Tabel (GER)	B	90	95	~~98~~	10	115	118	~~122~~	11	213
12	Yekaterina Bykova (KAZ)	B	88	91	~~94~~	16	116	119	~~123~~	10	210
13	Meri Ilmarinen (FIN)	A	94	~~97~~	~~97~~	12	116	~~118~~	~~118~~	14	210
14	Bilikis Otunla (NGR)	B	85	~~90~~	92	14	113	117	~~122~~	12	209
15	Nora Jäggi (SUI)	B	87	90	92	15	109	112	115	16	207
16	Chen En-tzu (TPE)	B	88	91	93	13	107	110	~~113~~	17	203
17	Nikola Seničová (SVK)	B	~~85~~	85	~~89~~	17	105	110	115	15	200
