= 2016 Junior World Weightlifting Championships =

International weightlifting competition

- Venue: Tbilisi Sports Palace
- Location: Tbilisi, Georgia
- Dates: 25 June–2 July 2016

The 2016 Junior World Weightlifting Championships were held in Tbilisi Sports Palace, Tbilisi, Georgia from 25 June to 2 July 2016. The competition was open to players aged 15–20 (born between 2001 and 1996).

== Medal table ==
Ranking by Big (Total result) medals

* Host nation (Georgia)

Rank	Nation	Gold	Silver	Bronze	Total
1	China (CHN)	4	1	3	8
2	Thailand (THA)	3	2	1	6
3	Colombia (COL)	1	1	1	3
4	Ecuador (ECU)	1	1	0	2
4	Georgia (GEO)*	1	1	0	2
4	North Korea (PRK)	1	1	0	2
7	Ukraine (UKR)	1	0	1	2
7	Uzbekistan (UZB)	1	0	1	2
9	Armenia (ARM)	1	0	0	1
9	United States (USA)	1	0	0	1
11	Mexico (MEX)	0	2	0	2
12	Japan (JPN)	0	1	2	3
13	Iran (IRI)	0	1	1	2
13	Russia (RUS)	0	1	1	2
15	Egypt (EGY)	0	1	0	1
15	Italy (ITA)	0	1	0	1
15	Mongolia (MGL)	0	1	0	1
18	Australia (AUS)	0	0	1	1
18	Great Britain (GBR)	0	0	1	1
18	Qatar (QAT)	0	0	1	1
18	Serbia (SRB)	0	0	1	1
Totals (21 entries)		15	15	15	45

Ranking by all medals: Big (Total result) and Small (Snatch and Clean & Jerk)

* Host nation (Georgia)

Rank	Nation	Gold	Silver	Bronze	Total
1	China (CHN)	9	6	10	25
2	Thailand (THA)	9	5	3	17
3	Colombia (COL)	4	1	4	9
4	Ecuador (ECU)	3	3	2	8
5	North Korea (PRK)	3	3	0	6
6	Georgia (GEO)*	3	2	1	6
7	Ukraine (UKR)	3	1	3	7
8	Armenia (ARM)	3	0	0	3
9	United States (USA)	2	0	0	2
10	Uzbekistan (UZB)	1	3	3	7
11	Russia (RUS)	1	2	1	4
12	Italy (ITA)	1	2	0	3
12	Mongolia (MGL)	1	2	0	3
14	Latvia (LAT)	1	0	0	1
14	Turkey (TUR)	1	0	0	1
16	Japan (JPN)	0	5	2	7
17	Mexico (MEX)	0	4	1	5
18	Iran (IRI)	0	2	4	6
19	Egypt (EGY)	0	2	1	3
20	Australia (AUS)	0	1	1	2
21	Spain (ESP)	0	1	0	1
22	Serbia (SRB)	0	0	3	3
23	Qatar (QAT)	0	0	2	2
24	Argentina (ARG)	0	0	1	1
24	Chinese Taipei (TPE)	0	0	1	1
24	Great Britain (GBR)	0	0	1	1
24	South Korea (KOR)	0	0	1	1
Totals (27 entries)		45	45	45	135

== Medal summary ==
=== Men ===
Event	Gold		Silver		Bronze	
56 kg
Snatch	Witoon Mingmoon (THA)	115 kg	Rafael Ferruzola (ECU)	107 kg	Julián Rivera (ECU)	103 kg
Clean & Jerk	Witoon Mingmoon (THA)	150 kg	Yuya Senoo (JPN)	135 kg	Lai Yung-en (TPE)	130 kg
Total	Witoon Mingmoon (THA)	265 kg	Rafael Ferruzola (ECU)	236 kg	Yuya Senoo (JPN)	233 kg
62 kg
Snatch	Mo Yongxiang (CHN)	137 kg	Pak Jong-ju (PRK)	131 kg	Meng Cheng (CHN)	130 kg
Clean & Jerk	Mo Yongxiang (CHN)	170 kg	Pak Jong-ju (PRK)	160 kg	Meng Cheng (CHN)	158 kg
Total	Mo Yongxiang (CHN)	307 kg	Pak Jong-ju (PRK)	291 kg	Meng Cheng (CHN)	288 kg
69 kg
Snatch	Ahmet Turan Okyay (TUR)	139 kg	Mitsunori Konnai (JPN)	138 kg	José Mosquera (COL)	137 kg
Clean & Jerk	Clarence Cummings Jr. (USA)	180 kg	Masanori Miyamoto (JPN)	170 kg	Ibrahim Moustafa (EGY)	168 kg
Total	Clarence Cummings Jr. (USA)	317 kg	Mitsunori Konnai (JPN)	305 kg	Masanori Miyamoto (JPN)	305 kg
77 kg
Snatch	Yeison López (COL)	156 kg	Viacheslav Iarkin (RUS)	153 kg	Brayan Rodallegas (COL)	151 kg
Clean & Jerk	Yeison López (COL)	190 kg	Shakhzod Khudayberganov (UZB)	184 kg	Zhou Yukun (CHN)	181 kg
Total	Yeison López (COL)	346 kg	Viacheslav Iarkin (RUS)	333 kg	Brayan Rodallegas (COL)	331 kg
85 kg
Snatch	Liu Jiawen (CHN)	165 kg	Antonino Pizzolato (ITA)	159 kg	Jhonatan Rivas (COL)	155 kg
Clean & Jerk	Antonino Pizzolato (ITA)	201 kg	Liu Jiawen (CHN)	200 kg	Fares El-Bakh (QAT)	196 kg
Total	Liu Jiawen (CHN)	365 kg	Antonino Pizzolato (ITA)	360 kg	Fares El-Bakh (QAT)	346 kg
94 kg
Snatch	Lesman Paredes (COL)	172 kg	Farkhodbek Sobirov (UZB)	170 kg	Reza Beiranvand (IRI)	161 kg
Clean & Jerk	Volodymyr Hoza (UKR)	204 kg	Farkhodbek Sobirov (UZB)	203 kg	Reza Beiranvand (IRI)	201 kg
Total	Farkhodbek Sobirov (UZB)	373 kg	Lesman Paredes (COL)	372 kg	Reza Beiranvand (IRI)	362 kg
105 kg
Snatch	Giorgi Chkheidze (GEO)	172 kg	Marcos Ruiz (ESP)	171 kg	Alireza Dehghanghahfarokhi (IRI)	171 kg
Clean & Jerk	Nikita Solovev (RUS)	210 kg	Alireza Dehghanghahfarokhi (IRI)	207 kg	Giorgi Chkheidze (GEO)	207 kg
Total	Giorgi Chkheidze (GEO)	379 kg	Alireza Dehghanghahfarokhi (IRI)	378 kg	Nikita Solovev (RUS)	375 kg
+105 kg
Snatch	Simon Martirosyan (ARM)	187 kg	Kosuke Chinen (JPN)	177 kg	Tamaš Kajdoči (SRB)	171 kg
Clean & Jerk	Simon Martirosyan (ARM)	225 kg	Ahmed Gaber (EGY)	221 kg	Tamaš Kajdoči (SRB)	216 kg
Total	Simon Martirosyan (ARM)	412 kg	Ahmed Gaber (EGY)	387 kg	Tamaš Kajdoči (SRB)	387 kg

=== Women ===
Event	Gold		Silver		Bronze	
48 kg
Snatch	Jiang Huihua (CHN)	86 kg	Thunya Sukcharoen (THA)	86 kg	Long Xiaoqun (CHN)	80 kg
Clean & Jerk	Thunya Sukcharoen (THA)	108 kg	Jiang Huihua (CHN)	107 kg	Long Xiaoqun (CHN)	101 kg
Total	Thunya Sukcharoen (THA)	194 kg	Jiang Huihua (CHN)	193 kg	Long Xiaoqun (CHN)	181 kg
53 kg
Snatch	Rebeka Koha (LAT)	92 kg	Yu Linglong (CHN)	91 kg	Supattra Kaewkhong (THA)	88 kg
Clean & Jerk	Rattanaphon Pakkaratha (THA)	116 kg	Yu Linglong (CHN)	115 kg	Supattra Kaewkhong (THA)	107 kg
Total	Yu Linglong (CHN)	206 kg	Rattanaphon Pakkaratha (THA)	201 kg	Supattra Kaewkhong (THA)	195 kg
58 kg
Snatch	Nawaporn Daengsri (THA)	97 kg	Ou Lingli (CHN)	97 kg	Muattar Nabieva (UZB)	95 kg
Clean & Jerk	Ou Lingli (CHN)	120 kg	Nawaporn Daengsri (THA)	114 kg	Muattar Nabieva (UZB)	112 kg
Total	Ou Lingli (CHN)	217 kg	Nawaporn Daengsri (THA)	211 kg	Muattar Nabieva (UZB)	207 kg
63 kg
Snatch	Rim Un-sim (PRK)	105 kg	Kiana Elliott (AUS)	95 kg	Ana Lilia Durán (MEX)	94 kg
Clean & Jerk	Rim Un-sim (PRK)	135 kg	Ana Lilia Durán (MEX)	122 kg	Joana Palacios (ARG)	113 kg
Total	Rim Un-sim (PRK)	240 kg	Ana Lilia Durán (MEX)	216 kg	Kiana Elliott (AUS)	204 kg
69 kg
Snatch	Neisi Dájomes (ECU)	105 kg	Angie Palacios (ECU)	98 kg	Alona Shevkoplias (UKR)	98 kg
Clean & Jerk	Neisi Dájomes (ECU)	125 kg	Jennifer Cantú (MEX)	124 kg	Alona Shevkoplias (UKR)	120 kg
Total	Neisi Dájomes (ECU)	230 kg	Jennifer Cantú (MEX)	219 kg	Alona Shevkoplias (UKR)	218 kg
75 kg
Snatch	Iryna Dekha (UKR)	116 kg	Mönkhjantsangiin Ankhtsetseg (MGL)	115 kg	Liang Xiaomei (CHN)	109 kg
Clean & Jerk	Mönkhjantsangiin Ankhtsetseg (MGL)	138 kg	Iryna Dekha (UKR)	138 kg	Liang Xiaomei (CHN)	136 kg
Total	Iryna Dekha (UKR)	254 kg	Mönkhjantsangiin Ankhtsetseg (MGL)	253 kg	Liang Xiaomei (CHN)	245 kg
+75 kg
Snatch	Anastasiia Hotfrid (GEO)	116 kg	Duangaksorn Chaidee (THA)	115 kg	Lisseth Ayoví (ECU)	108 kg
Clean & Jerk	Duangaksorn Chaidee (THA)	150 kg	Anastasiia Hotfrid (GEO)	140 kg	Kim Ji-hyeon (KOR)	132 kg
Total	Duangaksorn Chaidee (THA)	265 kg	Anastasiia Hotfrid (GEO)	256 kg	Mercy Brown (GBR)	236 kg
