= Crismery Santana =

Dominican Republic weightlifter (born 1995)

Personal information
- Full name: Crismery Dominga Santana Peguero
- Nationality: Dominican
- Born: 20 April 1995 (age 31) Hato Mayor del Rey, Dominican Republic
- Weight: 86.84 kg (191 lb)

Sport
- Country: Dominican Republic
- Sport: Weightlifting
- Events: –87 kg, +87 kg
- Coached by: Hector Dominguez, Moreno Martinez
Medal record
Representing Dominican Republic
Olympic Games
| Bronze medal – third place | 2020 Tokyo | –87 kg |
World Championships
| Bronze medal – third place | 2017 Anaheim | –90 kg |
| Bronze medal – third place | 2018 Ashgabat | –87 kg |
Pan American Games
| Silver medal – second place | 2019 Lima | –87 kg |
| Bronze medal – third place | 2023 Santiago | +81 kg |
Pan American Championships
| Gold medal – first place | 2018 Santo Domingo | –90 kg |
| Gold medal – first place | 2019 Guayaquil | –87 kg |
| Gold medal – first place | 2020 Santo Domingo | –87 kg |
| Gold medal – first place | 2021 Guayaquil | –87 kg |
| Silver medal – second place | 2017 Miami | –90 kg |
| Bronze medal – third place | 2022 Bogotá | +87 kg |
| Bronze medal – third place | 2023 Bariloche | +87 kg |

Crismery Dominga Santana Peguero (born 20 April 1995) is a Dominican Republic weightlifter.

== Career ==
She participated at the 2018 World Weightlifting Championships, winning a medal.

She represented the Dominican Republic at the 2020 Summer Olympics, She won the bronze medal in the Women's 87 kg event.

She won the bronze medal in the women's +87 kg event at the 2022 Pan American Weightlifting Championships held in Bogotá, Colombia. She also won medals in the Snatch and Clean & Jerk events in this competition.

In 2024, she finished in 9th place in the women's +81 kg event at the 2024 Summer Olympics held in Paris, France.

She won the +86 kg category silver medal in snatch and bronze in clean and jerk at the 2026 Central American and Caribbean Games.

== Major results ==
| Year | Venue | Weight | Snatch (kg) | | | | Clean & Jerk (kg) | | | | Total | Rank |
| Year | Venue | Weight | 1 | 2 | 3 | Rank | 1 | 2 | 3 | Rank | Total | Rank |
Olympic Games
| 2020 | Tokyo, Japan | 87 kg | 112 | 116 | ~~119~~ | —N/a | 140 | ~~144~~ | ~~144~~ | —N/a | 256 | 3rd place, bronze medalist(s) |
| 2024 | Paris, France | +81 kg | 111 | 115 | 118 | —N/a | ~~140~~ | ~~140~~ | 140 | —N/a | 258 | 9 |
World Championships
| 2015 | Houston, United States | 75 kg | 100 | ~~104~~ | 104 | 12 | 120 | ~~125~~ | ~~125~~ | 19 | 224 | 16 |
| 2017 | Anaheim, United States | 90 kg | 109 | 113 | ~~115~~ | 2nd place, silver medalist(s) | 136 | ~~141~~ | 141 | 3rd place, bronze medalist(s) | 254 | 3rd place, bronze medalist(s) |
| 2018 | Ashgabat, Turkmenistan | 87 kg | 110 | 113 | 116 | 2nd place, silver medalist(s) | ~~138~~ | ~~138~~ | 138 | 5 | 254 | 3rd place, bronze medalist(s) |
| 2019 | Pattaya, Thailand | 87 kg | 94 | — | — | 17 | 112 | — | — | 19 | 206 | 18 |
| 2022 | Bogotá, Colombia | +87 kg | 112 | 116 | ~~119~~ | 9 | 138 | 141 | — | 12 | 257 | 10 |
| 2023 | Riyadh, Saudi Arabia | +87 kg | 110 | 114 | ~~116~~ | 7 | 136 | 141 | 145 | 8 | 259 | 7 |
IWF World Cup
| 2024 | Phuket, Thailand | +87 kg | 112 | ~~116~~ | 116 | 9 | ~~140~~ | ~~140~~ | — | — | — | — |
Pan American Games
| 2019 | Lima, Peru | 87 kg | 111 | 115 | 117 | —N/a | 136 | 141 | ~~143~~ | —N/a | 258 | 2nd place, silver medalist(s) |
| 2023 | Santiago, Chile | +81 kg | 113 | 117 | ~~120~~ | —N/a | 145 | 150 | ~~155~~ | —N/a | 267 | 3rd place, bronze medalist(s) |
Pan American Championships
| 2014 | Santo Domingo, Dominican Republic | 75 kg | 90 | 96 | 100 | 5 | 110 | 120 | ~~125~~ | 9 | 220 | 9 |
| 2016 | Cartagena, Colombia | 75 kg | ~~101~~ | 101 | ~~106~~ | 6 | 122 | ~~130~~ | 131 | 3rd place, bronze medalist(s) | 232 | 4 |
| 2017 | Miami, United States | 90 kg | 108 | 113 | ~~115~~ | 1st place, gold medalist(s) | 135 | 139 | ~~143~~ | 2nd place, silver medalist(s) | 252 | 2nd place, silver medalist(s) |
| 2018 | Santo Domingo, Dominican Republic | 90 kg | 110 | 114 | 116 | 1st place, gold medalist(s) | 136 | ~~142~~ | 142 | 2nd place, silver medalist(s) | 258 | 1st place, gold medalist(s) |
| 2019 | Guatemala City, Guatemala | 87 kg | 107 | 110 | 112 | 1st place, gold medalist(s) | 136 | ~~141~~ | 141 | 2nd place, silver medalist(s) | 253 | 1st place, gold medalist(s) |
| 2020 | Santo Domingo, Dominican Republic | 87 kg | 110 | 115 | ~~118~~ | 1st place, gold medalist(s) | 137 | ~~142~~ | 142 | 2nd place, silver medalist(s) | 257 | 1st place, gold medalist(s) |
| 2021 | Guayaquil, Ecuador | 87 kg | 108 | ~~111~~ | 111 | 1st place, gold medalist(s) | 132 | 136 | — | 1st place, gold medalist(s) | 257 | 1st place, gold medalist(s) |
| 2022 | Bogotá, Colombia | +87 kg | 113 | 118 | ~~120~~ | 2nd place, silver medalist(s) | 140 | 145 | ~~150~~ | 3rd place, bronze medalist(s) | 263 | 3rd place, bronze medalist(s) |
| 2023 | Bariloche, Argentina | +87 kg | 113 | 117 | ~~120~~ | 3rd place, bronze medalist(s) | 145 | 150 | ~~155~~ | 3rd place, bronze medalist(s) | 267 | 3rd place, bronze medalist(s) |
