= Yudelina Mejía =

Dominican Republic weightlifter

Yudelina Mejía Peguero
Personal information
- Born: 4 June 1997 (age 29)

Sport
- Country: Dominican Republic
- Sport: Weightlifting
- Event: 81 kg
Medal record
Women's weightlifting
Representing Dominican Republic
World Championships
Silver medal – second place	2025 Førde	86 kg
Bronze medal – third place	2026 Ningbo	86 kg
Pan American Games
Silver medal – second place	2023 Santiago	81 kg
Pan American Championships
Gold medal – first place	2025 Cali	86 kg
Silver medal – second place	2021 Guayaquil	81 kg
Silver medal – second place	2022 Bogotá	81 kg
Silver medal – second place	2024 Caracas	81 kg
Central American and Caribbean Games
Gold medal – first place	2023 San Salvador	87 kg S
Gold medal – first place	2026 Santo Domingo	86 kg CJ
Silver medal – second place	2023 San Salvador	87 kg CJ
Silver medal – second place	2026 Santo Domingo	86 kg S

Yudelina Mejía Peguero (born 4 June 1997) is a Dominican Republic weightlifter. She won the silver medal in the women's 81 kg event at the 2023 Pan American Games held in Santiago, Chile. She is also a four-time medalist, including gold, at the Pan American Weightlifting Championships. Mejía represented the Dominican Republic at the 2024 Summer Olympics in Paris, France.

== Career ==
Mejía took up weightlifting at the age of 16. Her aunt encouraged her to get involved in a sport to get out of the house while she was taking care of her ailing grandmother.

Mejía won the silver medal in the women's 81 kg event at the 2021 Pan American Weightlifting Championships held in Guayaquil, Ecuador. She also won the silver medal in the same event at the 2022 Pan American Weightlifting Championships held in Bogotá, Colombia. In the same year, Mejía competed in the women's 81 kg event at the World Weightlifting Championships held in Bogotá, Colombia.

Mejía won two medals, including gold, at the 2023 Central American and Caribbean Games held in San Salvador, El Salvador. She won the gold medal in the women's 87 kg Snatch event and the silver medal in the women's 87 kg Clean & Jerk event. A few months later, she competed in the women's 81 kg event at the 2023 World Weightlifting Championships held in Riyadh, Saudi Arabia. In October 2023, Mejía won the silver medal in the women's 81 kg event at the Pan American Games held in Santiago, Chile.

In February 2024, Mejía won the silver medal in the women's 81 kg event at the Pan American Weightlifting Championships held in Caracas, Venezuela.

In August 2024, she competed in the women's 81 kg event at the Summer Olympics held in Paris, France. She lifted 256 kg in total and finished in fifth place. She won the 86 kg category gold medal in clean and jerk and silver in snatch at the 2026 Central American and Caribbean Games.

== Achievements ==
Year	Venue	Weight	Snatch (kg)				Clean & Jerk (kg)				Total	Rank
Year	Venue	Weight	1	2	3	Rank	1	2	3	Rank	Total	Rank
Olympic Games
2024	Paris, France	81 kg	~~111~~	111	~~115~~	—N/a	145	~~150~~	~~157~~	—N/a	256	5
World Championships
2022	Bogotá, Colombia	81 kg	107	~~112~~	~~112~~	10	136	~~141~~	~~142~~	9	243	10
2023	Riyadh, Saudi Arabia	81 kg	~~105~~	105	110	6	~~130~~	~~130~~	~~130~~	—	—	—
2024	Manama, Bahrain	81 kg	~~108~~	108	~~112~~	6	140	144	~~146~~	9	252	5
2025	Førde, Norway	86 kg	115	119	122	1st place, gold medalist(s)	145	149	~~153~~	2nd place, silver medalist(s)	271 AM	2nd place, silver medalist(s)
IWF World Cup
2024	Phuket, Thailand	81 kg	107	~~111~~	111	9	133	~~138~~	~~142~~	10	244	9
Pan American Games
2023	Santiago, Chile	81 kg	107	111	~~114~~	—N/a	130	133	~~144~~	—N/a	244	2nd place, silver medalist(s)
Pan American Championships
2020	Santo Domingo, Dominican Republic	81 kg	102	106	~~109~~	3rd place, bronze medalist(s)	125	131	136	3rd place, bronze medalist(s)	242	4
2021	Guayaquil, Ecuador	81 kg	105	108	111	1st place, gold medalist(s)	~~130~~	130	~~134~~	2nd place, silver medalist(s)	241	2nd place, silver medalist(s)
2022	Bogotá, Colombia	81 kg	104	109	113	2nd place, silver medalist(s)	128	135	139	2nd place, silver medalist(s)	252	2nd place, silver medalist(s)
2024	Caracas, Venezuela	81 kg	104	108	~~110~~	4	128	133	136	2nd place, silver medalist(s)	244	2nd place, silver medalist(s)
2025	Cali, Colombia	86 kg	113	117	123	1st place, gold medalist(s)	143	147	~~152~~	1st place, gold medalist(s)	270	1st place, gold medalist(s)
