= 2019 World Weightlifting Championships – Women's 87 kg =

The women's 87 kg competition at the 2019 World Weightlifting Championships was held from 24 to 26 September 2019.

== Schedule ==
Date	Time	Event
24 September 2019	22:30	Group C
25 September 2019	14:25	Group B
26 September 2019	20:25	Group A

== Medalists ==
Event	Gold		Silver		Bronze	
Snatch	Wang Zhouyu (CHN)	120 kg	Kim Un-ju (PRK)	115 kg	Naryury Pérez (VEN)	110 kg
Clean & Jerk	Wang Zhouyu (CHN)	158 kg	Kim Un-ju (PRK)	154 kg	Tamara Salazar (ECU)	144 kg
Total	Wang Zhouyu (CHN)	278 kg	Kim Un-ju (PRK)	269 kg	Tamara Salazar (ECU)	252 kg

== Records ==
Prior to this competition, the existing world records were as follows.

World Record	Snatch	World Standard	132 kg	—	1 November 2018
World Record	Clean & Jerk	World Standard	164 kg	—	1 November 2018
World Record	Total	World Standard	294 kg	—	1 November 2018

== Results ==
Rank	Athlete	Group	Snatch (kg)				Clean & Jerk (kg)				Total
Rank	Athlete	Group	1	2	3	Rank	1	2	3	Rank	Total
1st place, gold medalist(s)	Wang Zhouyu (CHN)	A	116	120	~~125~~	1st place, gold medalist(s)	147	153	158	1st place, gold medalist(s)	278
2nd place, silver medalist(s)	Kim Un-ju (PRK)	A	110	115	~~117~~	2nd place, silver medalist(s)	148	154	~~159~~	2nd place, silver medalist(s)	269
3rd place, bronze medalist(s)	Tamara Salazar (ECU)	A	105	108	~~111~~	4	140	144	~~147~~	3rd place, bronze medalist(s)	252
4	María Fernanda Valdés (CHI)	A	~~108~~	108	~~111~~	5	138	143	—	4	251
5	Naryury Pérez (VEN)	A	107	110	~~111~~	3rd place, bronze medalist(s)	135	140	~~143~~	5	250
6	Jaqueline Ferreira (BRA)	B	102	105	107	6	122	128	~~132~~	7	235
7	Jang Hyeon-ju (KOR)	B	97	100	~~102~~	10	124	128	130	6	230
8	Elena Cîlcic (MDA)	B	93	97	100	11	119	125	~~129~~	8	225
9	Mami Shimamoto (JPN)	A	100	~~103~~	~~103~~	12	~~122~~	~~122~~	122	10	222
10	Sarah Fischer (AUT)	A	97	~~102~~	~~102~~	14	~~125~~	125	~~130~~	9	222
11	Clémentine Meukeugni (CMR)	C	95	~~100~~	100	9	115	~~120~~	120	12	220
12	Louise Vennekilde (DEN)	B	94	~~97~~	98	13	118	~~121~~	~~121~~	14	216
13	Tuğçe Boynueğri (TUR)	A	95	98	101	8	115	~~118~~	~~118~~	17	216
14	Aýsoltan Toýçyýewa (TKM)	B	92	94	96	15	118	~~121~~	~~121~~	15	214
15	Erdenebatyn Bilegsaikhan (MGL)	C	90	93	95	16	111	115	~~118~~	16	210
16	Dolera Davronova (UZB)	A	~~90~~	~~90~~	90	19	120	~~124~~	~~124~~	13	210
17	Kinga Kaczmarczyk (POL)	C	85	88	~~90~~	21	115	~~119~~	120	11	208
18	Crismery Santana (DOM)	B	94	—	—	17	112	—	—	19	206
19	Keyshla Rodríguez (PUR)	C	83	88	92	18	~~108~~	108	112	18	204
20	Viktória Boros (HUN)	C	82	86	89	20	102	106	110	21	199
21	Parisa Jahanfekrian (IRI)	C	82	87	~~91~~	22	104	111	~~116~~	20	198
22	Tereza Králová (CZE)	C	~~75~~	75	80	23	90	95	~~100~~	22	175
—	Lo Ying-yuan (TPE)	A	101	106	~~109~~	7	—	—	—	—	—
—	Imari Morishita (JPN)	B	~~90~~	~~90~~	~~90~~	—	—	—	—	—	—
