= Wang Zhouyu =

Chinese weightlifter (born 1994)

Personal information
- Nationality: Chinese
- Born: 13 May 1994 (age 32)
- Weight: 85 kg (187 lb)

Sport
- Country: China
- Sport: Weightlifting
- Event: –87 kg
- Club: Hubei Province
Medal record
Representing China
Olympic Games
Gold medal – first place	2020 Tokyo	–87 kg
World Championships
Gold medal – first place	2018 Ashgabat	–76 kg
Gold medal – first place	2019 Pattaya	–87 kg
Silver medal – second place	2022 Bogotá	–81 kg
Silver medal – second place	2023 Riyadh	–81 kg
Asian Championships
Gold medal – first place	2015 Phuket	–75 kg
Gold medal – first place	2019 Ningbo	–87 kg
Gold medal – first place	2020 Tashkent	–87 kg
Silver medal – second place	2023 Jinju	–81 kg
Asian Junior Championships
Gold medal – first place	2013 Bishkek	–75 kg
National Games of China
Gold medal – first place	2017 Tianjin	–75 kg
Gold medal – first place	2021 Shaanxi	–87 kg

Wang Zhouyu (Chinese: 汪周雨; born 13 May 1994) is a Chinese weightlifter. She won the gold medal in the women's 87 kg event at the 2020 Summer Olympics in Tokyo, Japan.

She participated at the 2018 World Weightlifting Championships, winning the title.

== Major results ==
Year	Venue	Weight	Snatch (kg)				Clean & jerk (kg)				Total	Rank
Year	Venue	Weight	1	2	3	Rank	1	2	3	Rank	Total	Rank
Olympic Games
2021	Tokyo, Japan	87 kg	~~115~~	115	120	1	145	150	~~160~~	1	270	1st place, gold medalist(s)
World Championships
2018	Ashgabat, Turkmenistan	76 kg	113	118	~~122~~	2nd place, silver medalist(s)	140	146	152	1st place, gold medalist(s)	270	1st place, gold medalist(s)
2019	Pattaya, Thailand	87 kg	116	120	~~125~~	1st place, gold medalist(s)	147	153	158	1st place, gold medalist(s)	278	1st place, gold medalist(s)
2022	Bogotá, Colombia	81 kg	~~115~~	115	~~121~~	5	141	148	151	2nd place, silver medalist(s)	266	2nd place, silver medalist(s)
2023	Riyadh, Saudi Arabia	81 kg	117	122	~~124~~	1st place, gold medalist(s)	147	155	—	2nd place, silver medalist(s)	277	2nd place, silver medalist(s)
Asian Championships
2015	Phuket, Thailand	75 kg	110	115	—	1st place, gold medalist(s)	135	—	—	1st place, gold medalist(s)	250	1st place, gold medalist(s)
2020	Tashkent, Uzbekistan	87 kg	119	~~124~~	126	1st place, gold medalist(s)	148	154	160	1st place, gold medalist(s)	286	1st place, gold medalist(s)
2023	Jinju, South Korea	81 kg	~~115~~	~~115~~	115	2nd place, silver medalist(s)	140	146	~~151~~	2nd place, silver medalist(s)	261	2nd place, silver medalist(s)
IWF World Cup
2019	Fuzhou, China	76 kg	~~112~~	112	120	1st place, gold medalist(s)	140	~~148~~	~~150~~	3rd place, bronze medalist(s)	260	3rd place, bronze medalist(s)
2019	Tianjin, China	87 kg	117	122	126	1st place, gold medalist(s)	147	155	~~160~~	1st place, gold medalist(s)	281	1st place, gold medalist(s)
