= Weightlifting at the 2024 Summer Olympics – Women's 81 kg =

Women's 81 kg at the Games of the XXXIII Olympiad
- Venue: Paris Expo Porte de Versailles
- Date: 10 August 2024
- Competitors: 13 from 13 nations
- Winning total: 275 kg OR

Medalists
1st place, gold medalist(s)		Solfrid Koanda	Norway
2nd place, silver medalist(s)		Sara Ahmed	Egypt
3rd place, bronze medalist(s)		Neisi Dájomes	Ecuador

The Women's 81 kg weightlifting competitions at the 2024 Summer Olympics in Paris took place on 10 August at the Paris Expo Porte de Versailles.

== Records ==
{{{caption}}}
World Record	Snatch	World Standard	127 kg	—	1 November 2018
World Record	Clean & Jerk	Liang Xiaomei (CHN)	161 kg	Doha, Qatar	12 December 2023
World Record	Total	Liang Xiaomei (CHN)	284 kg	Doha, Qatar	12 December 2023
Olympic Record	Snatch	Olympic Standard	122 kg	—	
Olympic Record	Clean & Jerk	Olympic Standard	150 kg	—	
Olympic Record	Total	Olympic Standard	267 kg	—	

The following records were established during the competition:

Category	Athlete	New record	Type
Clean & Jerk	Sara Ahmed (EGY)	151 kg	OR
Clean & Jerk	Solfrid Koanda (NOR)	154 kg	OR
Total	Solfrid Koanda (NOR)	275 kg	OR

== Results ==
Rank	Athlete	Nation	Snatch (kg)				Clean & Jerk (kg)				Total
Rank	Athlete	Nation	1	2	3	Result	1	2	3	Result	Total
1st place, gold medalist(s)	Solfrid Koanda	Norway	117	121	~~124~~	121	148	154	~~162~~	154 OR	275 OR
2nd place, silver medalist(s)	Sara Ahmed	Egypt	113	117	~~119~~	117	146	151	~~155~~	151	268
3rd place, bronze medalist(s)	Neisi Dájomes	Ecuador	~~118~~	118	122	122	~~145~~	145	~~151~~	145	267
4	Eileen Cikamatana	Australia	113	117	~~120~~	117	145	~~149~~	~~149~~	145	262
5	Yudelina Mejía	Dominican Republic	~~111~~	111	~~115~~	111	145	~~150~~	~~157~~	145	256
6	Kim Su-hyeon	South Korea	~~110~~	110	~~113~~	110	140	~~147~~	~~147~~	140	250
7	Laura Amaro	Brazil	105	~~110~~	~~110~~	105	130	135	~~140~~	135	240
8	Rigina Adashbaeva	Uzbekistan	100	103	105	105	125	131	~~136~~	131	236
9	Yekta Jamali	Refugee Olympic Team	95	99	103	103	124	128	~~133~~	128	231
10	Mönkhjantsangiin Ankhtsetseg	Mongolia	100	~~106~~	~~108~~	100	120	125	—	125	225
11	Ajah Pritchard-Lolo	Vanuatu	85	89	~~92~~	89	103	108	~~112~~	108	197
—	Ayamey Medina	Cuba	96	100	~~103~~	100	~~120~~	~~120~~	—	—	DNF
—	Weronika Zielińska-Stubińska	Poland	~~106~~	~~106~~	~~107~~	—	—	—	—	—	DNF
