= Hellen Escobar =

Colombian weightlifter

Sport
- Country: Colombia
- Sport: Weightlifting
- Weight class: 71 kg; 76 kg; 81 kg; 87 kg
Medal record
Representing Colombia
Women's weightlifting
World Championships
Silver medal – second place	2023 Riyadh	76 kg
Pan American Championships
Gold medal – first place	2024 Caracas	76 kg
Silver medal – second place	2022 Bogotá	76 kg
Bronze medal – third place	2019 Guatemala City	71 kg
Central American and Caribbean Games
Gold medal – first place	2023 San Salvador	76 kg S
Gold medal – first place	2023 San Salvador	76 kg CJ
Junior World Championships
Bronze medal – third place	2018 Tashkent	69 kg

Hellen Andrea Escobar Aguirre is a Colombian weightlifter. She won the silver medal in the women's 76 kg event at the 2023 World Weightlifting Championships held in Riyadh, Saudi Arabia. She is a three-time medalist, including gold, at the Pan American Weightlifting Championships. She won the gold medal in her event at the 2023 Central American and Caribbean Games held in San Salvador, El Salvador.

In 2022, Escobar competed in the women's 87 kg event at the 2022 South American Games held in Asunción, Paraguay. In that same year, she also competed in the women's 76 kg event at the World Weightlifting Championships held in Bogotá, Colombia. In 2023, she competed in the women's 81 kg event at the Pan American Games held in Santiago, Chile.

In 2024, she won the gold medal in the women's 76 kg event at the Pan American Weightlifting Championships held in Caracas, Venezuela.

== Achievements ==
Year	Venue	Weight	Snatch (kg)				Clean & Jerk (kg)				Total	Rank
Year	Venue	Weight	1	2	3	Rank	1	2	3	Rank	Total	Rank
Representing Colombia
World Championships
2022	Bogotá, Colombia	76 kg	103	107	~~109~~	5	133	135	~~138~~	4	242	4
2023	Riyadh, Saudi Arabia	76 kg	~~103~~	103	106	3rd place, bronze medalist(s)	132	136	~~140~~	2nd place, silver medalist(s)	242	2nd place, silver medalist(s)
Pan American Games
2023	Santiago, Chile	81 kg	97	~~101~~	101	—N/a	123	127	~~131~~	—N/a	228	8
Pan American Championships
2024	Caracas, Venezuela	76 kg	95	~~99~~	~~99~~	3rd place, bronze medalist(s)	122	126	—	1st place, gold medalist(s)	221	1st place, gold medalist(s)
Central American and Caribbean Games
2023	San Salvador, El Salvador	76 kg	102	104	~~107~~	1st place, gold medalist(s)	127	136	~~140~~	1st place, gold medalist(s)	—N/a	—N/a
South American Games
2022	Asunción, Paraguay	87 kg	~~102~~	102	~~105~~	—N/a	~~128~~	128	~~132~~	—N/a	230	4
