= Weightlifting at the 2017 Summer Universiade – Women's 90 kg =

Women's 90 kg at the XXIX Summer Universiade
- Venues: Tamkang University Shao-Mo Memorial Gymnasium 7F
- Dates: 25 August 2017
- Competitors: 9 from 8 nations

Medalists
1st place, gold medalist(s)		Iryna Dekha	Ukraine
2nd place, silver medalist(s)		Diana Mstieva	Russia
3rd place, bronze medalist(s)		Lo Ying-yuan	Chinese Taipei

The women's 90 kg event at the 2017 Summer Universiade was held on 25 August 2017 at the Tamkang University Shao-Mo Memorial Gymnasium 7F.

== Records ==
Prior to this competition, the existing world and Universiade records were as follows:

- Initial records

Category		Nation	Athlete	Record	Place	Date	Meet
World record	Snatch	Ukraine	Viktoriya Shaymardanova	130 kg	Athens, Greece	21 August 2004	2004 Summer Olympics
World record	Clean & Jerk	Armenia	Hripsime Khurshudyan	160 kg	Antalya, Turkey	25 September 2010	2010 World Championships
World record	Total	Armenia	Hripsime Khurshudyan	283 kg	Antalya, Turkey	25 September 2010	2010 World Championships
Universiade records	Snatch	Chinese Taipei (TPE)	Yao Chi-ling	105 kg	Kazan, Russia	11 July 2013	2013 Summer Universiade
Universiade records	Clean & Jerk	Russia (RUS)	Liudmila Anina	134 kg	Kazan, Russia	11 July 2013	2013 Summer Universiade
Universiade records	Total	Chinese Taipei (TPE)	Yao Chi-ling	238 kg	Kazan, Russia	11 July 2013	2013 Summer Universiade

- Broken record

Category		Nation	Athlete	Record	Place	Date
Universiade records	Snatch	Ukraine (UKR)	Iryna Dekha	111 kg	New Taipei, Taiwan	25 August 2017
Universiade records	Clean & Jerk	Ukraine (UKR)	Iryna Dekha	135 kg	New Taipei, Taiwan	25 August 2017
Universiade records	Total	Ukraine (UKR)	Iryna Dekha	246 kg	New Taipei, Taiwan	25 August 2017

== Results ==
Rank	Athlete	Group	Body weight	Snatch (kg)				Clean & Jerk (kg)				Total
Rank	Athlete	Group	Body weight	1	2	3	Result	1	2	3	Result	Total
1st place, gold medalist(s)	Iryna Dekha (UKR)	A	78.91	~~111~~	111	~~115~~	111 UR	130	135	–	135 UR	246 UR
2nd place, silver medalist(s)	Diana Mstieva (RUS)	A	89.21	105	~~110~~	110	110	~~130~~	~~130~~	132	132	242
3rd place, bronze medalist(s)	Lo Ying-yuan (TPE)	A	88.73	100	105	~~107~~	105	130	~~138~~	~~138~~	130	235
4	Aremi Fuentes (MEX)	A	76.21	99	102	105	105	127	~~132~~	~~132~~	127	232
5	Anna Van Bellinghen (BEL)	A	85.09	101	~~105~~	106	106	121	~~126~~	~~127~~	121	227
6	Anastasiia Bezliudnaia (RUS)	A	85.39	90	94	~~100~~	94	110	115	~~120~~	115	209
7	Lauren Adele Fargher (NZL)	A	83.56	~~84~~	84	~~87~~	84	95	~~100~~	100	100	184
8	Tereza Karlová (CZE)	A	89.66	77	~~81~~	~~81~~	77	85	90	~~94~~	90	167
9	Mathilde Aagaard (DEN)	A	89.09	~~70~~	72	~~75~~	72	~~90~~	90	~~92~~	90	162
