= 2018 World Weightlifting Championships – Women's 87 kg =

The women's 87 kg competition at the 2018 World Weightlifting Championships was held on 9 November 2018.

== Schedule ==
Date	Time	Event
9 November 2018	12:00	Group B
9 November 2018	19:55	Group A

== Medalists ==
Event	Gold		Silver		Bronze	
Snatch	Ao Hui (CHN)	117 kg	Crismery Santana (DOM)	116 kg	Kim Un-ju (PRK)	111 kg
Clean & Jerk	Kim Un-ju (PRK)	152 kg	Ao Hui (CHN)	151 kg	María Fernanda Valdés (CHI)	140 kg
Total	Ao Hui (CHN)	268 kg	Kim Un-ju (PRK)	263 kg	Crismery Santana (DOM)	254 kg

== Records ==
Prior to this competition, the existing world records were as follows.

World Record	Snatch	World Standard	132 kg	—	1 November 2018
World Record	Clean & Jerk	World Standard	164 kg	—	1 November 2018
World Record	Total	World Standard	294 kg	—	1 November 2018

== Results ==
Rank	Athlete	Group	Snatch (kg)				Clean & Jerk (kg)				Total
Rank	Athlete	Group	1	2	3	Rank	1	2	3	Rank	Total
1st place, gold medalist(s)	Ao Hui (CHN)	A	110	114	117	1st place, gold medalist(s)	142	148	151	2nd place, silver medalist(s)	268
2nd place, silver medalist(s)	Kim Un-ju (PRK)	A	108	111	~~115~~	3rd place, bronze medalist(s)	145	150	152	1st place, gold medalist(s)	263
3rd place, bronze medalist(s)	Crismery Santana (DOM)	A	110	113	116	2nd place, silver medalist(s)	~~138~~	~~138~~	138	5	254
4	María Fernanda Valdés (CHI)	A	108	110	~~112~~	5	137	139	140	3rd place, bronze medalist(s)	250
5	Naryury Pérez (VEN)	A	105	109	111	4	133	~~138~~	138	4	249
6	Diana Mstieva (RUS)	A	103	108	~~111~~	7	126	133	136	6	244
7	Oliba Nieve (ECU)	A	103	106	109	6	128	~~132~~	132	7	241
8	Ksenia Paskhina (RUS)	A	100	104	107	8	~~126~~	126	~~133~~	8	233
9	Kinga Kaczmarczyk (POL)	A	93	96	98	12	~~123~~	123	~~127~~	10	221
10	Kaity Fassina (AUS)	B	97	~~100~~	100	10	117	120	~~123~~	12	220
11	Keyshla Rodríguez (PUR)	B	~~93~~	~~93~~	93	15	113	118	123	9	216
12	Krisztina Magát (HUN)	B	94	98	~~100~~	11	~~117~~	117	~~121~~	14	215
13	Dolera Davronova (UZB)	B	88	91	93	14	118	~~123~~	~~124~~	13	211
14	Louise Vennekilde (DEN)	B	90	~~94~~	~~95~~	16	111	116	121	11	211
15	Tuğçe Boynueğri (TUR)	B	93	95	~~98~~	13	110	115	~~118~~	15	210
—	Mami Shimamoto (JPN)	A	98	102	~~105~~	9	~~120~~	~~120~~	~~120~~	—	—
