= Weightlifting at the 2015 Pan American Games – Women's 69 kg =

Weightlifting – Women's 69 kg at the 2015 Pan American Games
- Venue: Oshawa Sports Centre
- Dates: July 14
- Competitors: 10 from 9 nations

Medalists
Gold medal	Leydi Solís	Colombia
Silver medal	Neisi Dájomes	Ecuador
Bronze medal	Aremi Fuentes	Mexico

The women's 69 kg competition of the weightlifting events at the 2015 Pan American Games in Toronto, Canada, was held on July 14 at the Oshawa Sports Centre. The defending champion was Mercedes Pérez from Colombia.

== Schedule ==
All times are Eastern Daylight Time (UTC-4).

Date	Time	Round
July 14, 2015	14:00	Final

== Results ==
10 athletes from nine countries took part.

Rank	Name	Country	Group	B.weight (kg)	Snatch (kg)	Clean & Jerk (kg)	Total (kg)
1st place, gold medalist(s)	Leydi Solís	Colombia	A	68.91	111 PR	145 PR	256 PR
2nd place, silver medalist(s)	Neisi Dájomes	Ecuador	A	68.58	100	125	225
3rd place, bronze medalist(s)	Aremi Fuentes	Mexico	A	68.44	98	125	223
4	Kristel Ngarlem	Canada	A	68.72	93	118	211
5	Dayana Chirinos Leon	Venezuela	A	68.42	95	115	210
6	Marie-Josée Arès-Pilon	Canada	A	68.20	95	114	209
7	Maria Belen Martinez	Argentina	A	68.49	92	111	203
8	Rocio Navarro Castillo	Panama	A	67.51	87	110	197
9	Cecilly Morales Melendez	Puerto Rico	A	69.00	85	112	197
10	Medgina Celestin	Haiti	A	67.95	85	101	186
