= Ao Hui =

Chinese weightlifter (born 1997)

Personal information
- Nationality: Chinese
- Born: 20 April 1997 (age 29)
- Weight: 85.81 kg (189 lb)

Sport
- Country: China
- Sport: Weightlifting
- Event: –87 kg
- Club: Jiangxi Province
Medal record
World Championships
Gold medal – first place	2018 Ashgabat	–87 kg
Asian Championships
Bronze medal – third place	2019 Ningbo	–87 kg
Junior Asian Championships
Gold medal – first place	2015 Doha	–75 kg
Youth Asian Championships
Silver medal – second place	2014 Bangsaen	+69 kg
National Games of China
Silver medal – second place	2021 Shaanxi	–87 kg

Ao Hui (born 20 April 1997) is a Chinese weightlifter.

She participated at the 2018 World Weightlifting Championships, winning a gold medal.

== Major results ==
Year	Venue	Weight	Snatch (kg)				Clean & Jerk (kg)				Total	Rank
Year	Venue	Weight	1	2	3	Rank	1	2	3	Rank	Total	Rank
World Championships
2018	Ashgabat, Turkmenistan	87 kg	110	114	117	1st place, gold medalist(s)	142	148	151	2nd place, silver medalist(s)	268	1st place, gold medalist(s)
