= Weightlifting at the 2023 Pan American Games – Women's +81 kg =

Weightlifting – Women's +81kg at the 2023 Pan American Games
- Venue: Gimnasio Chimkowe
- Dates: 24 October
- Competitors: 9 from 9 nations

Medalists
Gold medal	Mary Theisen-Lappen	United States
Silver medal	Lisseth Ayoví	Ecuador
Bronze medal	Crismery Santana	Dominican Republic

The women's +81 kg competition of the weightlifting events at the 2023 Pan American Games in Santiago, Chile, was held on 24 October at the Gimnasio Chimkowe.

Each lifter performed in both the snatch and clean and jerk lifts, with the final score being the sum of the lifter's best result in each. The athlete received three attempts in each of the two lifts; the score for the lift was the heaviest weight successfully lifted. This weightlifting event was limited to competitors with a minimum of 81 kilograms of body mass.

== Results ==
The results were as follows:

Rank	Athlete	Nation	Group	Snatch (kg)				Clean & Jerk (kg)				Total
Rank	Athlete	Nation	Group	1	2	3	Result	1	2	3	Result	Total
1st place, gold medalist(s)	Mary Theisen-Lappen	United States	A	112	116	120	120	150	155	157	157	277
2nd place, silver medalist(s)	Lisseth Ayoví	Ecuador	A	111	116	119	119	147	152	157	157	276
3rd place, bronze medalist(s)	Crismery Santana	Dominican Republic	A	113	117	~~120~~	117	145	150	~~155~~	150	267
4	Adbeel Rodríguez	Mexico	A	108	~~113~~	114	114	145	150	~~154~~	150	264
5	Naryury Pérez	Venezuela	A	108	112	115	115	143	148	~~153~~	148	263
6	Elizabeth Reyes	Cuba	A	96	100	104	104	125	130	135	135	239
7	Arantzazu Miranda	Chile	A	100	105	~~108~~	105	120	125	128	128	233
8	Scarleth Ucelo	Independent Athletes Team	A	~~85~~	85	~~91~~	85	~~115~~	115	120	120	205
9	Mariadni Fernández	Panama	A	80	85	90	90	100	105	~~110~~	105	195
