= 2017 World Weightlifting Championships – Women's 90 kg =

The Women's 90 kg competition at the 2017 World Weightlifting Championships was held on 4 December 2017.

== Schedule ==
Date	Time	Event
4 December 2017	13:55	Group B
4 December 2017	19:55	Group A

== Medalists ==
Event	Gold		Silver		Bronze	
Snatch	Anastasiia Hotfrid (GEO)	120 kg	Crismery Santana (DOM)	113 kg	Oliba Nieve (ECU)	112 kg
Clean & Jerk	María Fernanda Valdés (CHI)	146 kg	Anastasiia Hotfrid (GEO)	145 kg	Crismery Santana (DOM)	141 kg
Total	Anastasiia Hotfrid (GEO)	265 kg	María Fernanda Valdés (CHI)	255 kg	Crismery Santana (DOM)	254 kg

== Records ==
Prior to this competition, the existing world records were as follows.

World record	Snatch	Viktoriya Shaimardanova (UKR)	130 kg	Athens, Greece	21 August 2004
World record	Clean & Jerk	~~Hripsime Khurshudyan (ARM)~~; Derya Açıkgöz (TUR)	~~160 kg~~ 155 kg	~~Antalya, Turkey~~; Antalya, Turkey	~~25 September 2010~~; 26 April 2002
World record	Total	~~Hripsime Khurshudyan (ARM)~~; Viktoriya Shaimardanova (UKR)	~~283 kg~~ 280 kg	~~Antalya, Turkey~~; Athens, Greece	~~25 September 2010~~; 21 August 2004

- Hripsime Khurshudyan's world records were rescinded in 2016.

== Results ==
Rank	Athlete	Group	Snatch (kg)				Clean & Jerk (kg)				Total
Rank	Athlete	Group	1	2	3	Rank	1	2	3	Rank	Total
1st place, gold medalist(s)	Anastasiia Hotfrid (GEO)	A	116	~~120~~	120	1st place, gold medalist(s)	135	140	145	2nd place, silver medalist(s)	265
2nd place, silver medalist(s)	María Fernanda Valdés (CHI)	A	109	~~113~~	~~113~~	4	138	146	—	1st place, gold medalist(s)	255
3rd place, bronze medalist(s)	Crismery Santana (DOM)	A	109	113	~~115~~	2nd place, silver medalist(s)	136	~~141~~	141	3rd place, bronze medalist(s)	254
4	Oliba Nieve (ECU)	A	105	109	112	3rd place, bronze medalist(s)	125	130	134	5	246
5	Marissa Klingseis (USA)	A	98	102	105	5	130	134	~~137~~	4	239
6	Tamara Salazar (ECU)	B	95	99	101	8	125	130	133	6	234
7	Ali Ludwig (USA)	A	99	~~103~~	103	6	124	128	~~133~~	8	231
8	Lo Ying-yuan (TPE)	A	~~100~~	100	~~103~~	11	129	~~135~~	~~137~~	7	229
9	Meri Ilmarinen (FIN)	B	100	~~102~~	102	7	121	124	~~126~~	9	226
10	Anna Van Bellinghen (BEL)	B	97	~~101~~	101	9	117	121	~~124~~	10	222
11	Mami Shimamoto (JPN)	B	100	~~105~~	~~108~~	10	112	120	~~125~~	11	220
12	Clémentine Meukeugni (CMR)	B	~~95~~	95	~~100~~	12	117	~~123~~	~~123~~	12	212
13	Pan Li-chen (TPE)	B	~~85~~	85	~~90~~	13	105	110	~~115~~	13	195
14	Erdenebatyn Bilegsaikhan (MGL)	B	75	80	~~85~~	14	95	105	~~111~~	14	185
