= Weightlifting at the 2019 Pan American Games – Women's 76 kg =

Weightlifting – Women's 76 kg at the 2019 Pan American Games
- Venue: Coliseo Mariscal Caceres
- Dates: July 29
- Competitors: 8 from 7 nations

Medalists
Gold medal	Neisi Dájomes	Ecuador
Silver medal	Aremi Fuentes	Mexico
Bronze medal	Katherine Nye	United States

The women's 76 kg competition of the weightlifting events at the 2019 Pan American Games in Lima, Peru, was held on July 29 at the Coliseo Mariscal Caceres.

== Results ==
Eight athletes from seven countries took part.

Rank	Athlete	Nation	Group	Snatch (kg)				Clean & Jerk (kg)				Total
Rank	Athlete	Nation	Group	1	2	3	Result	1	2	3	Result	Total
1st place, gold medalist(s)	Neisi Dájomes	Ecuador	A	109	112	115	115	~~135~~	135	140	140	255
2nd place, silver medalist(s)	Aremi Fuentes	Mexico	A	107	110	~~112~~	110	134	137	140	140	250
3rd place, bronze medalist(s)	Katherine Nye	United States	A	104	108	~~112~~	108	~~133~~	135	~~140~~	135	243
4	Leydi Solís	Colombia	A	100	~~105~~	105	105	135	~~138~~	~~140~~	135	240
5	Melissa Aguilera	Cuba	A	96	100	102	102	122	127	~~131~~	127	229
6	Yaneisy Merino	Cuba	A	~~96~~	96	100	100	125	~~130~~	~~130~~	125	225
7	Lenka Rojas	Chile	A	85	90	~~95~~	90	112	118	~~123~~	118	208
8	Estrella Saldarriaga	Peru	A	~~83~~	~~83~~	83	83	102	~~107~~	107	107	190
