= Weightlifting at the 2015 Pan American Games – Women's +75 kg =

Weightlifting – Women's +75 kg at the 2015 Pan American Games
- Venue: Oshawa Sports Centre
- Dates: July 15
- Competitors: 6 from 5 nations

Medalists
Gold medal	Yaniuska Espinosa	Venezuela
Silver medal	Naryury Perez	Venezuela
Bronze medal	Oliba Nieve	Ecuador

The women's +75 kg competition of the weightlifting events at the 2015 Pan American Games in Toronto, Canada, was held on July 15 at the Oshawa Sports Centre. The defending champion was Oliba Nieve from Ecuador.

== Schedule ==
All times are Eastern Daylight Time (UTC-4).

Date	Time	Round
July 15, 2015	16:30	Final

== Results ==
6 athletes from five countries took part. A seventh weightlifter Astrid Camposeco of Guatemala was disqualified before competition, as she tested positive for doping on July 9.

Rank	Name	Country	Group	B.weight (kg)	Snatch (kg)	Clean & Jerk (kg)	Total (kg)
1st place, gold medalist(s)	Yaniuska Espinosa	Venezuela	A	110.68	115	148	263
2nd place, silver medalist(s)	Naryury Perez	Venezuela	A	98.28	112	146	258
3rd place, bronze medalist(s)	Oliba Nieve	Ecuador	A	92.51	115	142	257
4	Tania Mascorro	Mexico	A	107.84	116	140	256
5	Holley Mangold	United States	A	173.19	104	135	239
	Verónica Saladín	Dominican Republic	A	116.31	115	-	
