= Weightlifting at the 2019 Pan American Games – Women's 87 kg =

Weightlifting – Women's 87 kg at the 2019 Pan American Games
- Venue: Coliseo Mariscal Caceres
- Dates: July 30
- Competitors: 9 from 9 nations

Medalists
Gold medal	María Fernanda Valdés	Chile
Silver medal	Crismery Santana	Dominican Republic
Bronze medal	Tamara Salazar	Ecuador

The women's 87 kg competition of the weightlifting events at the 2019 Pan American Games in Lima, Peru, was held on July 30 at the Coliseo Mariscal Caceres.

== Results ==
9 athletes from nine countries took part.

Rank	Athlete	Nation	Group	Snatch (kg)				Clean & Jerk (kg)				Total
Rank	Athlete	Nation	Group	1	2	3	Result	1	2	3	Result	Total
1st place, gold medalist(s)	María Fernanda Valdés	Chile	A	110	112	~~114~~	112	140	143	147	147	259
2nd place, silver medalist(s)	Crismery Santana	Dominican Republic	A	111	115	117	117	136	141	~~143~~	141	258
3rd place, bronze medalist(s)	Tamara Salazar	Ecuador	A	105	108	110	110	141	146	~~150~~	146	256
4	Naryury Pérez	Venezuela	A	107	110	112	112	135	140	~~140~~	140	252
5	Ana Torres	Mexico	A	100	~~104~~	104	104	130	135	~~137~~	135	239
6	Jaqueline Ferreira	Brazil	A	100	~~105~~	105	105	125	131	~~135~~	131	236
7	Keyshla Rodríguez	Puerto Rico	A	88	~~93~~	~~93~~	88	112	117	~~120~~	120	208
8	Carla Santillán	Argentina	A	85	88	90	90	112	117	~~120~~	117	207
9	Angie Castro	Peru	A	~~78~~	78	~~80~~	78	100	~~105~~	105	105	183

== New records ==
Snatch	117 kg	Crismery Santana (DOM)	AM, PR
Clean & Jerk	147 kg	María Fernanda Valdés (CHI)	AM
Total	259 kg	María Fernanda Valdés (CHI)	AM
