= Iryna Dekha =

Ukrainian weightlifter (born 1996)

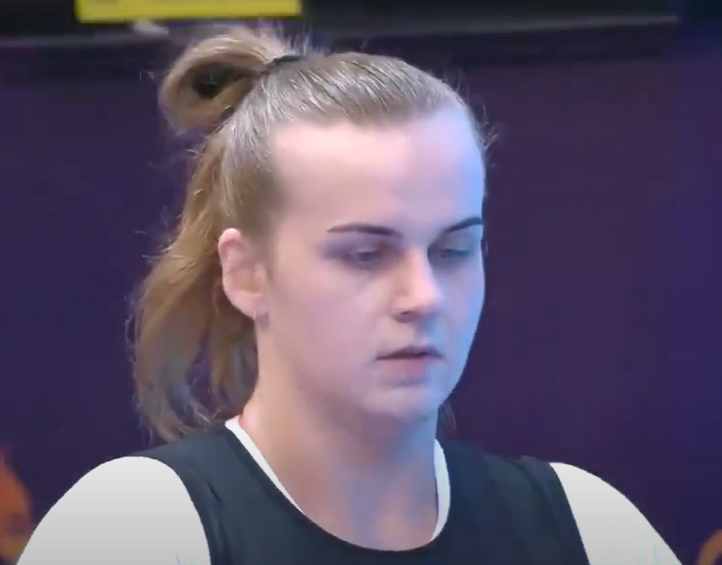
- Dekha in 2020

Personal information
- Native name: Ірина Михайлівна Деха
- Full name: Iryna Mykhailivna Dekha
- Born: May 14, 1996 (age 30) Kharkiv, Ukraine
- Height: 1.74 m (5 ft 9 in)
- Weight: 81 kg (179 lb)

Sport
- Sport: Weightlifting
- Club: MSU
- Coached by: Yevhen Shylov

Achievements and titles
- Personal bests: Snatch: 123 kg (2023); Clean and jerk: 141 kg (2016); Total: 260 kg (2016)
Medal record
Women's weightlifting
Representing Ukraine
European Championships
| Gold medal – first place | 2016 Førde | −75 kg |
| Gold medal – first place | 2021 Moscow | −76 kg |
| Gold medal – first place | 2022 Tirana | −81 kg |
| Gold medal – first place | 2023 Yerevan | −81 kg |
Summer Universiade
| Gold medal – first place | 2017 Taipei | −90 kg |
World Juniors Championships
| Gold medal – first place | 2016 Tbilisi | −75 kg |
| Bronze medal – third place | 2015 Warsaw | −75 kg |
European Junior & U23 Championships
| Gold medal – first place | 2016 Eilat | Junior −75 kg |
| Gold medal – first place | 2019 Bucharest | U23 −76 kg |
| Silver medal – second place | 2015 Klaipėda | Junior +75 kg |
- Updated on June 4, 2022

Iryna Mykhailivna Dekha (Ukrainian: Ірина Михайлівна Деха, born May 14, 1996, in Kharkiv) is a Ukrainian weightlifter. She is a two-time Olympian and a four-time European champion (2016, 2021, 2022 and 2023).

== Career ==
Dekha started her trainings while studying at the Professional Sports College Kharkiv which graduates were, among others, Oleksiy Torokhtiy, Vanda Maslovska, Oleksandr Likhvald, Kamila Konotop, Viktoriya Shaimardanova.

She showed high performances in junior age, winning several medals, and managed to qualify for the national team. Her first senior championships was 2015 European Championships in Tbilisi, Georgia, where she finished 8th, but next year she would become European champion.

Dekha competed for Ukraine at the 2016 Summer Olympics. She lifted in total 247 kg and finished 5th.

2017 European Championships in Split, Norway, was not successful for Dekha since she failed to lift any weight in clear and jerk. Later that year, she became champion of the 2017 Summer Universiade where she won the competition in the −90 kg category.

In 2018, Dekha debuted at the World Championships and finished 6th in Ashgabat, Turkmenistan. In 2019, she was 5th.

Dekha was one of two Ukrainian weightlifters at the 2020 Summer Olympics in Tokyo, Japan. She went to Tokyo as reigning European champion after winning the title at the 2021 European Championships in Moscow, Russia. Though she finished 2nd in snatch at the Olympics, she failed to lift any weight in clear and jerk.

Dekha changed her weight category to 81 kg and won her third European title in 2022 in Tirana, Albania, where she lifted in total 253 kg and surpassed the silver medalist and her team fellow Alina Marushchak by 18 kg.

She won the gold medal in the women's 81 kg event at the 2023 European Weightlifting Championships held in Yerevan, Armenia.

== Major results ==
| Year | Venue | Weight | Snatch (kg) | | | | Clean & Jerk (kg) | | | | Total | Rank |
| Year | Venue | Weight | 1 | 2 | 3 | Rank | 1 | 2 | 3 | Rank | Total | Rank |
Summer Olympics
| 2016 | Rio de Janeiro, Brazil | 75 kg | 111 | 114 | ~~116~~ | 4 | 133 | ~~138~~ | ~~141~~ | 8 | 247 | 5 |
| 2020 | Tokyo, Japan | 76 kg | 110 | ~~113~~ | 113 | 2 | ~~131~~ | ~~131~~ | ~~131~~ | — | — | — |
World Championships
| 2018 | Ashgabat, Turkmenistan | 81 kg | 98 | 101 | 103 | 6 | 117 | 121 | 123 | 10 | 226 | 6 |
| 2019 | Pattaya, Thailand | 76 kg | 105 | 108 | 110 | 4 | 126 | 129 | 132 | 5 | 242 | 5 |
| 2022 | Bogotá, Colombia | 81 kg | 117 | 120 | 122 | 1st place, gold medalist(s) | 138 | ~~142~~ | ~~142~~ | 6 | 260 | 4 |
European Championships
| 2015 | (Georgia (country)) Tbilisi, Georgia | 75 kg | 100 | 104 | ~~110~~ | 8 | ~~111~~ | 111 | ~~115~~ | 11 | 215 | 8 |
| 2016 | Førde, Norway | 75 kg | 110 | 113 | 115 | 1st place, gold medalist(s) | 127 | 131 | 135 | 1st place, gold medalist(s) | 250 | 1st place, gold medalist(s) |
| 2017 | Split, Croatia | 75 kg | 114 | 117 | 120 | 1st place, gold medalist(s) | ~~137~~ | ~~137~~ | ~~137~~ | — | — | — |
| 2021 | Moscow, Russia | 76 kg | 110 | 113 | ~~115~~ | 1st place, gold medalist(s) | 130 | ~~135~~ | 135 | 1st place, gold medalist(s) | 248 | 1st place, gold medalist(s) |
| 2022 | Tirana, Albania | 81 kg | 110 | 114 | 116 | 1st place, gold medalist(s) | 130 | 134 | 137 | 1st place, gold medalist(s) | 253 | 1st place, gold medalist(s) |
| 2023 | Yerevan, Armenia | 81 kg | 115 | 120 | 123 | 1st place, gold medalist(s) | 135 | ~~139~~ | ~~139~~ | 1st place, gold medalist(s) | 258 | 1st place, gold medalist(s) |
