= Ana Lilia Durán =

Mexican weightlifter (born 1997)

Personal information
- Full name: Ana Lilia Durán Ayon
- Born: 16 November 1997 (age 28) Mexicali, Baja California, Mexico
- Weight: 62.14 kg (137.0 lb)

Sport
- Country: Mexico
- Sport: Weightlifting
- Weight class: 63 kg
- Team: National team
- Updated on June 21, 2017

Ana Lilia Durán Ayon (born 16 November 1997) is a Mexican female weightlifter, who competed in the 63 kg category and represented Mexico at international competitions. She won the silver medal at the 2014 Summer Youth Olympics.

== Major results ==
| Year | Venue | Weight | Snatch (kg) | | | | Clean & Jerk (kg) | | | | Total | Rank |
| Year | Venue | Weight | 1 | 2 | 3 | Rank | 1 | 2 | 3 | Rank | Total | Rank |
Summer Youth Olympics
| 2014 | Nanjing, China | 63 kg | 85 | 88 | 90 | --- | 115 | 118 | 120 | --- | 210 | 2nd place, silver medalist(s) |
