= Laura Amaro =

Brazilian weightlifter (born 2000)

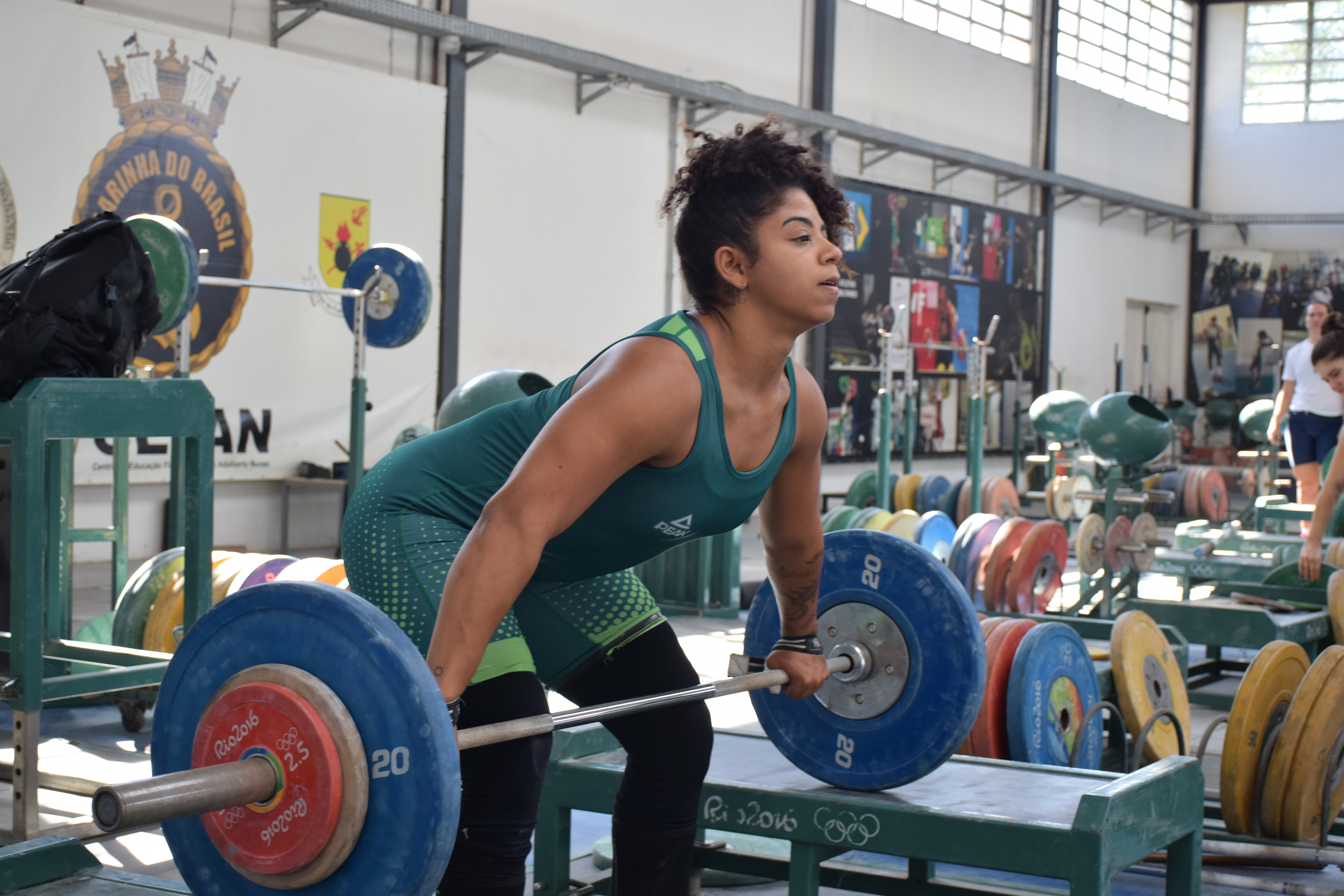
- Laura Amaro in 2024

Personal information
- Full name: Laura Nascimento Amaro
- Born: 27 October 2000 (age 25) Rio de Janeiro, Brazil

Sport
- Country: Brazil
- Sport: Weightlifting
- Coached by: Carlos Aveiro
Medal record
Women's weightlifting
Representing Brazil
World Championships
Silver medal – second place	2021 Tashkent	Snatch-76 kg
Pan American Games
Bronze medal – third place	2023 Santiago	81 kg
Pan American Championships
Bronze medal – third place	2021 Guayaquil	76 kg
Bronze medal – third place	2022 Bogotá	81 kg
Bronze medal – third place	2024 Caracas	81 kg
Bronze medal – third place	2025 Cali	77 kg
Bronze medal – third place	2026 Panama City	77 kg
South American Games
Silver medal – second place	2022 Asunción	87 kg

Laura Nascimento Amaro (born 27 October 2000) is a Brazilian weightlifter.

== Career ==
She won the silver medal in the women's 76 kg Snatch event at the 2021 World Weightlifting Championships held in Tashkent, Uzbekistan. She won the silver medal in women's 87 kg event at the 2022 South American Games held in Asunción, Paraguay. She is a three-time bronze medalist at the Pan American Weightlifting Championships.

In 2023, Amaro won the bronze medal in the women's 81 kg event at the Pan American Games held in Santiago, Chile. In February 2024, she won the bronze medal in her event at the 2024 Pan American Weightlifting Championships held in Caracas, Venezuela.

In August 2024, Amaro competed in the women's 81 kg event at the 2024 Summer Olympics held in Paris, France. She lifted 240 kg in total and finished seventh among 13 participants.

She also competed in the girls' skeleton event at the 2016 Winter Youth Olympics held in Lillehammer, Norway.

== Achievements ==
Year	Venue	Weight	Snatch (kg)				Clean & Jerk (kg)				Total	Rank
Year	Venue	Weight	1	2	3	Rank	1	2	3	Rank	Total	Rank
Olympic Games
2024	Paris, France	81 kg	105	~~110~~	~~110~~	—N/a	130	135	~~140~~	—N/a	240	7
World Weightlifting Championships
2021	Tashkent, Uzbekistan	76 kg	103	106	108	2nd place, silver medalist(s)	126	132	~~137~~	4	240	4
2022	Bogotá, Colombia	81 kg	~~106~~	~~110~~	110	8	~~136~~	~~136~~	137	8	247	8
2023	Riyadh, Saudi Arabia	81 kg	108	~~112~~	~~112~~	7	133	~~138~~	~~140~~	5	241	5
2025	Førde, Norway	77 kg	~~107~~	~~107~~	107	6	133	~~137~~	139	4	246	5
IWF World Cup
2024	Phuket, Thailand	81 kg	107	110	112	7	~~133~~	137	141	6	253	8
Pan American Games
2023	Santiago, Chile	81 kg	105	110	~~112~~	—N/a	~~131~~	132	~~135~~	—N/a	242	3rd place, bronze medalist(s)
Pan American Championships
2021	Guayaquil, Ecuador	76 kg	101	~~105~~	106	2nd place, silver medalist(s)	122	~~128~~	130	5	236	3rd place, bronze medalist(s)
2022	Bogotá, Colombia	81 kg	105	~~110~~	~~110~~	3rd place, bronze medalist(s)	130	~~136~~	138	3rd place, bronze medalist(s)	243	3rd place, bronze medalist(s)
2023	Bariloche, Argentina	81 kg	~~106~~	107	~~111~~	5	135	~~139~~	~~140~~	6	242	6
2024	Caracas, Venezuela	81 kg	108	~~112~~	~~112~~	3rd place, bronze medalist(s)	133	135	~~137~~	3rd place, bronze medalist(s)	243	3rd place, bronze medalist(s)
2025	Cali, Colombia	77 kg	105	109	110	2nd place, silver medalist(s)	130	134	136	3rd place, bronze medalist(s)	246	3rd place, bronze medalist(s)
South American Games
2022	Asunción, Paraguay	87 kg	106	~~109~~	109	—N/a	130	136	138	—N/a	247	2nd place, silver medalist(s)
Youth World Weightlifting Championships
2016	Penang, Malaysia	63 kg	75	~~80~~	~~80~~	14	90	96	~~100~~	13	171	13
