= Iván Escudero =

Ecuadorian weightlifter (born 2001)

Personal information
- Full name: Iván Andrés Escudero Ordoñez
- Born: 11 January 2001 (age 25)

Sport
- Country: Ecuador
- Sport: Weightlifting
- Weight class: 81 kg; 89 kg
Medal record
Men's weightlifting
Representing Ecuador
South American Games
Silver medal – second place	2022 Asunción	81 kg
Bolivarian Games
Silver medal – second place	2022 Valledupar	89 kg S
Silver medal – second place	2022 Valledupar	89 kg CJ
Junior Pan American Games
Gold medal – first place	2021 Cali-Valle	81 kg

Iván Andrés Escudero Ordoñez (born 11 January 2001) is an Ecuadorian weightlifter. He won the silver medal in the men's 81 kg event at the 2022 South American Games held in Asunción, Paraguay. He is also a two-time silver medalist at the 2022 Bolivarian Games held in Valledupar, Colombia.

Escudero won the gold medal in the men's 81 kg event at the 2021 Junior Pan American Games held in Colombia. He competed in the men's 81 kg event at the 2022 World Weightlifting Championships in Bogotá, Colombia.

== Achievements ==
Year	Venue	Weight	Snatch (kg)				Clean & Jerk (kg)				Total	Rank
Year	Venue	Weight	1	2	3	Rank	1	2	3	Rank	Total	Rank
World Championships
2021	Tashkent, Uzbekistan	81 kg	143	147	~~150~~	14	177	180	—	12	327	12
2022	Bogotá, Colombia	81 kg	145	150	153	9	183	~~190~~	~~191~~	11	336	10
South American Games
2022	Asunción, Paraguay	81 kg	140	145	148	2	172	180	187	1	335	2nd place, silver medalist(s)
Bolivarian Games
2022	Valledupar, Colombia	89 kg	146	148	150	2nd place, silver medalist(s)	165	181	187	2nd place, silver medalist(s)	—N/a	—N/a
