= Weightlifting at the 2020 Summer Olympics – Women's 87 kg =

Women's 87 kg at the Games of the XXXII Olympiad
- Venue: Tokyo International Forum
- Date: 2 August 2021
- Competitors: 13 from 13 nations
- Winning total: 270 kg

Medalists
1st place, gold medalist(s)		Wang Zhouyu	China
2nd place, silver medalist(s)		Tamara Salazar	Ecuador
3rd place, bronze medalist(s)		Crismery Santana	Dominican Republic

The women's 87 kg weightlifting competition at the 2020 Summer Olympics in Tokyo took place on 2 August 2021 at the Tokyo International Forum. Wang Zhouyu won the gold, with a combined lift of 270 kg.

The bouquets were presented by IWF Delegate Sam Coffa (Olympian in weightlifting, Australia), and the medals were presented by IOC Member Luis Mejía Oviedo (Dominican Republic).

== Records ==
Prior to this competition, the existing world and Olympic records were as follows.

World Record	Snatch	World standard	132 kg	—	1 November 2018
World Record	Clean & Jerk	World standard	164 kg	—	1 November 2018
World Record	Total	World standard	294 kg	—	1 November 2018
Olympic Record	Snatch	Olympic Standard	130 kg	—	1 November 2018
Olympic Record	Clean & Jerk	Olympic Standard	159 kg	—	1 November 2018
Olympic Record	Total	Olympic Standard	289 kg	—	1 November 2018

== Results ==
Rank	Athlete	Nation	Group	Body weight	Snatch (kg)				Clean & Jerk (kg)				Total
Rank	Athlete	Nation	Group	Body weight	1	2	3	Result	1	2	3	Result	Total
1st place, gold medalist(s)	Wang Zhouyu	China	A	84.20	~~115~~	115	120	120	145	150	~~160~~	150	270
2nd place, silver medalist(s)	Tamara Salazar	Ecuador	A	85.30	108	111	113	113	144	147	150	150	263
3rd place, bronze medalist(s)	Crismery Santana	Dominican Republic	A	86.50	112	116	~~119~~	116	140	~~144~~	~~144~~	140	256
4	Mönkhjantsangiin Ankhtsetseg	Mongolia	A	86.95	~~110~~	110	~~112~~	110	~~140~~	142	~~147~~	142	252
5	Gaëlle Nayo-Ketchanke	France	A	84.05	103	106	108	108	135	139	~~145~~	139	247
6	Mattie Rogers	United States	A	78.55	108	~~111~~	~~112~~	108	~~138~~	~~138~~	138	138	246
7	Naryury Pérez	Venezuela	A	86.35	105	109	112	112	130	~~137~~	~~138~~	130	242
8	Elena Cîlcic	Moldova	A	86.80	105	~~109~~	~~109~~	105	130	135	~~139~~	135	240
9	Kang Yeoun-hee	South Korea	B	76.70	100	~~103~~	103	103	120	125	128	128	231
10	Lydia Valentín	Spain	B	80.60	100	103	~~106~~	103	122	–	–	122	225
11	Clementine Meukeugni	Cameroon	B	85.85	99	~~103~~	~~103~~	99	~~120~~	120	125	125	224
12	Jaqueline Ferreira	Brazil	B		~~95~~	95	100	100	115	~~124~~	~~124~~	115	215
13	Kanah Andrews-Nahu	New Zealand	B		94	~~98~~	~~100~~	94	105	112	~~120~~	112	206
