= Kristel Ngarlem =

Canadian weightlifter (born 1995)

Personal information
- Born: July 20, 1995 (age 31) Montreal, Quebec, Canada

Sport
- Country: Canada
- Sport: Weightlifting
Medal record
Women's weightlifting
Representing Canada
Commonwealth Games
Silver medal – second place	2022 Birmingham	87 kg
Commonwealth Championships
Gold medal – first place	2021 Tashkent	87 kg
Pan American Championships
Bronze medal – third place	2019 Guatemala City	76 kg
IWF World Cup
Bronze medal – third place	2020 Rome	76 kg

Kristel Ngarlem (born July 20, 1995) is a Canadian weightlifter. She won the silver medal in the women's 87 kg event at the 2022 Commonwealth Games held in Birmingham, England. She is a bronze medallist at the Pan American Weightlifting Championships. She represented Canada at the 2020 Summer Olympics in Tokyo, Japan.

== Career ==
Ngarlem represented Canada in the women's 69 kg event at the 2014 Commonwealth Games held in Glasgow, Scotland where she finished in 5th place. In 2015, she competed in the women's 69 kg event at the Pan American Games in Toronto, Canada where she finished in 4th place. At the 2017 Summer Universiade held in Taipei, Taiwan, she finished in 4th place in the women's 75 kg event.

In 2020, Ngarlem won the bronze medal in the women's 76 kg event at the Roma 2020 World Cup in Rome, Italy.

In June 2021, Ngarlem was named to Canada's Olympic team at the 2020 Summer Olympics in Tokyo, Japan. She competed in the women's 76 kg event.

== Personal life ==
She was born to a Chadian father and white-Québécois mother.

She studied criminology at the Université de Montréal in Montreal, Quebec, Canada.
