= María Fernanda Valdés =

Chilean weightlifter (born 1992)

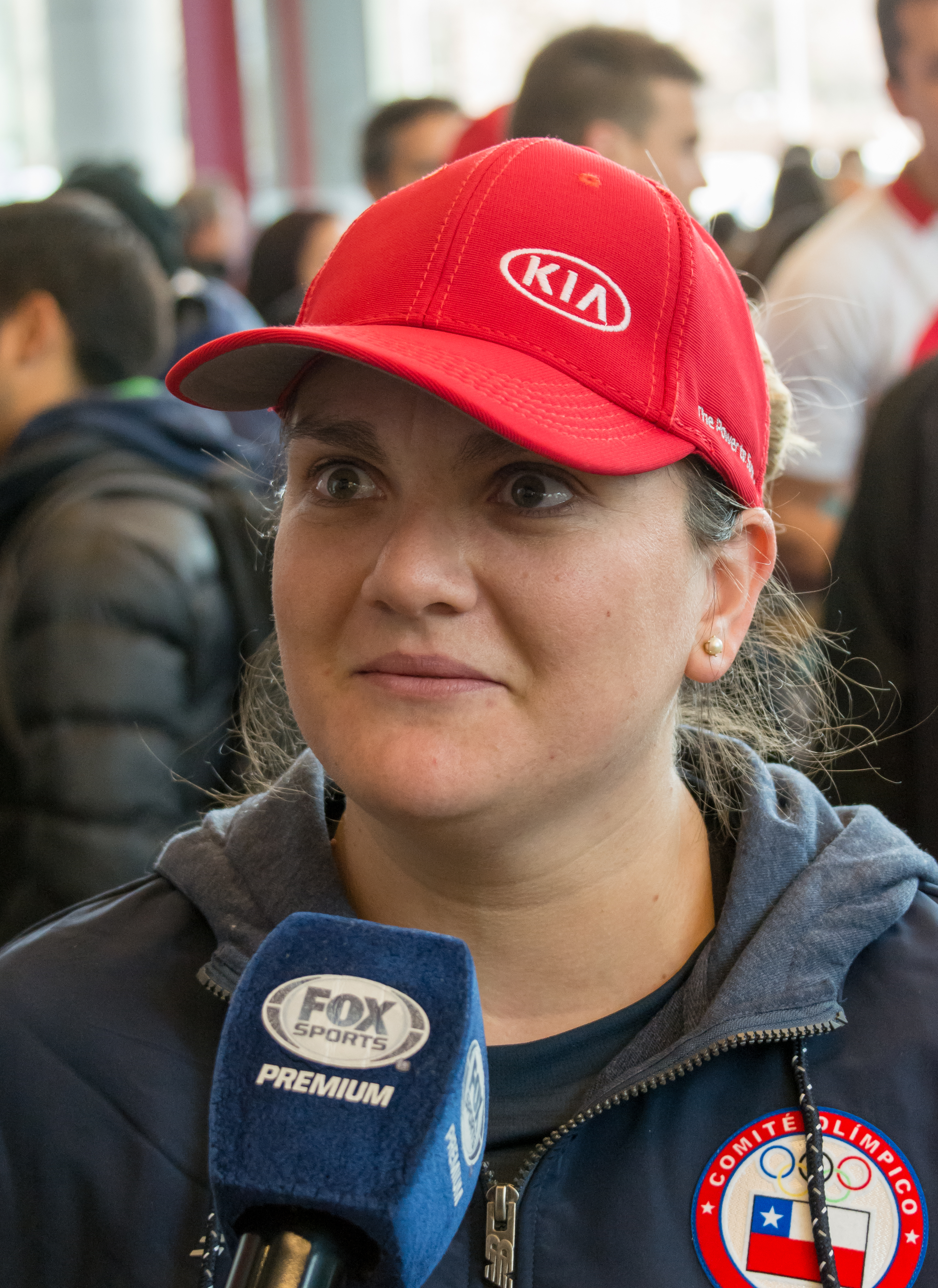

Personal information
- Born: 17 March 1992 (age 34) Coquimbo, Chile
- Height: 1.61 m (5 ft 3 in)
- Weight: 75 kg (165 lb)

Sport
- Country: Chile
- Sport: Weightlifting
- Event: Women's 75 kg
Medal record
World Championships
Silver medal – second place	2017 Anaheim	–90 kg
Pan American Games
Gold medal – first place	2019 Lima	–87 kg
Silver medal – second place	2011 Guadalajara	–75 kg
Silver medal – second place	2015 Toronto	–75 kg

María Fernanda Valdés Paris (born 17 March 1992) is a Chilean weightlifter. She won the silver medal at the 2011 Pan American Games in the 75 kg event and also at the 2015 Pan American Games in the 75 kg event.

She competed at the 2012 and 2016 Summer Olympics.

== Career ==
She competed at the 2012 Summer Olympics in the 75 kg event finishing ninth.

In the Pan American Weightlifting Championships 2016, held in Colombia, she took first place. In that competition she lifted a total of 244 kilos, tying with the Colombian Ubaldina Valoyes, but the lower weight of the Chilean won her the gold medal. Days later, Chilean Weightlifting Federation confirmed her for the Olympic Games in Rio de Janeiro 2016.

At the Olympics in Rio de Janeiro, Valdes finished seventh in the final of the under 75 kilos category, lifting 107 kilos in the snatch, and 135 in the clean and jerk, totaling 242 kilos.

At the 2017 World Championships in Anaheim, she finished in second place overall, achieving the top weight in the clean and jerk (146 kg).

She qualified to represent Chile at the 2020 Summer Olympics, but had to withdraw less than two weeks before the start of the event due to a shoulder dislocation.

== Major results ==
Year	Venue	Weight	Snatch (kg)				Clean & Jerk (kg)				Total	Rank
Year	Venue	Weight	1	2	3	Rank	1	2	3	Rank	Total	Rank
Olympic Games
2012	London, United Kingdom	75 kg	96	~~100~~	~~100~~	7	120	127	~~131~~	5	223	6
2016	Rio de Janeiro, Brazil	75 kg	~~107~~	~~107~~	107	6	135	~~142~~	~~142~~	5	242	7
Pan American Games
2019	Lima, Peru	87 kg	110	112	~~114~~	2	140	143	147	1	259	1st place, gold medalist(s)
Bolivarian Games
2013	Trujillo, Peru	75 kg	95	~~100~~	~~100~~	4	120	125	~~128~~	2	220	3rd place, bronze medalist(s)
