= Liang Xiaomei =

Chinese weightlifter (born 1997)

Personal information
- Citizenship: China
- Born: 20 September 1997 (age 29)

Sport
- Sport: Weightlifting
- Weight class: 81kg
Medal record
Women's weightlifting
Representing China
World Championships
| Gold medal – first place | 2022 Bogotá | 81 kg |
| Gold medal – first place | 2023 Riyadh | 81 kg |
Asian Games
| Gold medal – first place | 2022 Hangzhou | 87 kg |

Liang Xiaomei (Chinese: 梁小梅; September 20, 1997) is a Chinese weightlifter.

== Career ==
She won two gold medals at the World Weightlifting Championships, in 2022 and 2023, both in the 81 kg category.
