= Weightlifting at the 2020 Summer Olympics – Women's 76 kg =

Women's 76 kg at the Games of the XXXII Olympiad
- Venue: Tokyo International Forum
- Date: 1 August 2021
- Competitors: 13 from 13 nations
- Winning total: 263 kg

Medalists
1st place, gold medalist(s)		Neisi Dájomes	Ecuador
2nd place, silver medalist(s)		Katherine Nye	United States
3rd place, bronze medalist(s)		Aremi Fuentes	Mexico

The women's 76 kg weightlifting competition at the 2020 Summer Olympics in Tokyo took place on 1 August 2021 at the Tokyo International Forum. Neisi Dájomes won the gold, with a combined lift of 263 kg.

The bouquets were presented by IWF Executive Board Member Karoliina Lundahl (Olympian in weightlifting, Finland), and the medals were presented by IOC Member Ryu Seung-min (Olympian in table tennis, 1 gold, silver, and bronze medal, South Korea).

== Records ==
{{{caption}}}
World Record	Snatch	Rim Jong-sim (PRK)	124 kg	Pattaya, Thailand	24 September 2019
World Record	Clean & Jerk	Zhang Wangli (CHN)	156 kg	Fuzhou, China	26 February 2019
World Record	Total	Rim Jong-sim (PRK)	278 kg	Ningbo, China	26 April 2019
Olympic Record	Snatch	Olympic Standard	121 kg	—	1 November 2018
Olympic Record	Clean & Jerk	Olympic Standard	149 kg	—	1 November 2018
Olympic Record	Total	Olympic Standard	270 kg	—	1 November 2018

== Results ==
Rank	Athlete	Nation	Group	Body weight	Snatch (kg)				Clean & Jerk (kg)				Total
Rank	Athlete	Nation	Group	Body weight	1	2	3	Result	1	2	3	Result	Total
1st place, gold medalist(s)	Neisi Dájomes	Ecuador	A	75.10	111	115	118	118	135	140	145	145	263
2nd place, silver medalist(s)	Katherine Nye	United States	A	75.15	107	111	~~114~~	111	133	138	~~148~~	138	249
3rd place, bronze medalist(s)	Aremi Fuentes	Mexico	A	75.65	105	108	~~110~~	108	135	137	~~139~~	137	245
4	Patricia Strenius	Sweden	A	72.80	~~102~~	~~102~~	102	102	130	133	~~138~~	133	235
5	Darya Naumava	Belarus	A	75.30	103	~~107~~	~~107~~	103	125	131	~~133~~	131	234
6	Kumushkhon Fayzullaeva	Uzbekistan	A	71.80	97	~~101~~	101	101	122	126	~~130~~	126	227
7	Emily Muskett	Great Britain	B	71.85	92	95	98	98	117	~~123~~	124	124	222
8	Kristel Ngarlem	Canada	B	75.35	92	95	~~97~~	95	123	~~126~~	~~126~~	123	218
9	Mahassen Fattouh	Lebanon	B	69.60	88	93	~~97~~	93	112	118	124	124	217
10	Nancy Genzel Abouke	Nauru	B	71.80	~~88~~	88	90	90	108	113	~~117~~	113	203
11	Jeanne Gaëlle Eyenga	Cameroon	B	75.50	86	91	~~96~~	91	111	~~116~~	~~118~~	111	202
–	Iryna Dekha	Ukraine	A	75.75	110	~~113~~	113	113	~~131~~	~~131~~	~~131~~	–	–
–	Kim Su-hyeon	South Korea	A	75.65	106	~~109~~	~~110~~	106	~~138~~	~~140~~	~~140~~	–	–
