= Weightlifting at the 2023 Pan American Games =

- Weightlifting pictogram
- Venue: Gimnasio Chimkowe
- Start date: October 21, 2023
- End date: October 24, 2023
- No. of events: 10 (5 men, 5 women)
- Competitors: 137 from 26 nations

Weightlifting competitions at the 2023 Pan American Games in Santiago, Chile were held between October 21 and 24, 2023 at the Gimnasio Chimkowe in Peñalolén, a suburb of Santiago.

A total of 10 events (five each for men and women) were contested, four less than in the last edition of the games. There was a merger of the respective events: 67 kg and 73 kg for men, 109 kg and +109 kg for men, 55 kg and 59 kg for women, 87 kg and +87 kg for women.

== Qualification ==
A total of 136 weightlifters (68 per gender) qualified to compete at the games. A nation may enter a maximum of 8 weightlifters (four per gender). The host nation (Chile) automatically qualified the maximum team size. All other nations qualified through their team scores from both the 2021 and 2022 Pan American Championships combined. A further two wild cards were awarded (one per gender). Extra spots were granted to the winners of the respective categories at the 2021 Junior Pan American Games.

== Participating nations ==
A total of 26 countries/teams qualified weightlifters. The number of athletes a nation has entered is in parentheses beside the name of the country or team.

- Argentina (5)
- Barbados (2)
- Bolivia (3)
- Brazil (6)
- Canada (6)
- Chile (9)
- Colombia (13)
- Costa Rica (3)
- Cuba (6)
- Dominican Republic (9)
- Ecuador (9)
- El Salvador (2)
- Guyana (2)
- Independent Athletes Team (6)
- Honduras (3)
- Jamaica (1)
- Mexico (9)
- Nicaragua (4)
- Panama (4)
- Paraguay (4)
- Peru (6)
- Puerto Rico (2)
- Trinidad and Tobago (1)
- United States (9)
- Uruguay (5)
- Venezuela (8)

== Medal summary ==
=== Medal table ===
* Host nation (Chile)

| Rank | PASO | Gold | Silver | Bronze | Total |
|---|---|---|---|---|---|
| 1 | Colombia | 3 | 3 | 0 | 6 |
| 2 | Venezuela | 2 | 1 | 2 | 5 |
| 3 | United States | 2 | 1 | 1 | 4 |
| 4 | Dominican Republic | 1 | 1 | 2 | 4 |
| 5 | Cuba | 1 | 1 | 1 | 3 |
| 5 | Ecuador | 1 | 1 | 1 | 3 |
| 7 | Mexico | 0 | 1 | 1 | 2 |
| 8 | Canada | 0 | 1 | 0 | 1 |
| 9 | Brazil | 0 | 0 | 1 | 1 |
| 9 | Peru | 0 | 0 | 1 | 1 |
| Totals (10 entries) | | 10 | 10 | 10 | 30 |

=== Medalists ===
==== Men's events ====
| Event | Gold | | Silver | | Bronze | |
|---|---|---|---|---|---|---|
| 61 kg | Arley Calderón; Cuba | 279 kg | Víctor Güemez; Mexico | 276 kg | Luis Bardalez; Peru | 275 kg |
| 73 kg | Julio Mayora; Venezuela | 342 kg | Luis Javier Mosquera; Colombia | 333 kg | Jorge Cárdenas; Mexico | 317 kg |
| 89 kg | Keydomar Vallenilla; Venezuela | 383 kg | Yeison López; Colombia | 382 kg | Olfides Sáez; Cuba | 357 kg |
| 102 kg | Jhonatan Rivas; Colombia | 382 kg | Juan Carlos Zaldívar; Cuba | 375 kg | Jhohan Sanguino; Venezuela | 371 kg |
| +102 kg | Rafael Cerro; Colombia | 410 kg | Keiser Witte; United States | 409 kg | Dixon Arroyo; Ecuador | 371 kg |

==== Women's events ====
| Event | Gold | | Silver | | Bronze | |
|---|---|---|---|---|---|---|
| 49 kg | Dahiana Ortiz; Dominican Republic | 190 kg | Katherin Echandía; Venezuela | 189 kg | Beatriz Pirón; Dominican Republic | 181 kg |
| 59 kg | Yenny Álvarez; Colombia | 228 kg | Maude Charron; Canada | 226 kg | Anyelin Venegas; Venezuela | 222 kg |
| 71 kg | Angie Palacios; Ecuador | 253 kg | Mari Sánchez; Colombia | 246 kg | Meredith Alwine; United States | 239 kg |
| 81 kg | Olivia Reeves; United States | 258 kg | Yudelina Mejía; Dominican Republic | 244 kg | Laura Amaro; Brazil | 242 kg |
| +81 kg | Mary Theisen-Lappen; United States | 277 kg | Lisseth Ayoví; Ecuador | 276 kg | Crismery Santana; Dominican Republic | 267 kg |

== See also ==
- Powerlifting at the 2023 Parapan American Games
- Weightlifting at the 2024 Summer Olympics
