= Ayamey Medina =

Cuban weightlifter (born 1998)

Ayamey Damiana Medina Roca (born 21 February 1998) is a Cuban weightlifter. She placed seventh in the women's 81kg category at the 2022 World Weightlifting Championships. Medina qualified to represent Cuba at the 2024 Summer Olympics based on her world ranking. During the women's 81kg weightlifting event, Medina failed several attempts and withdrew early due to injury.
