= Tamara Salazar =

Ecuadorian weightlifter (born 1997)

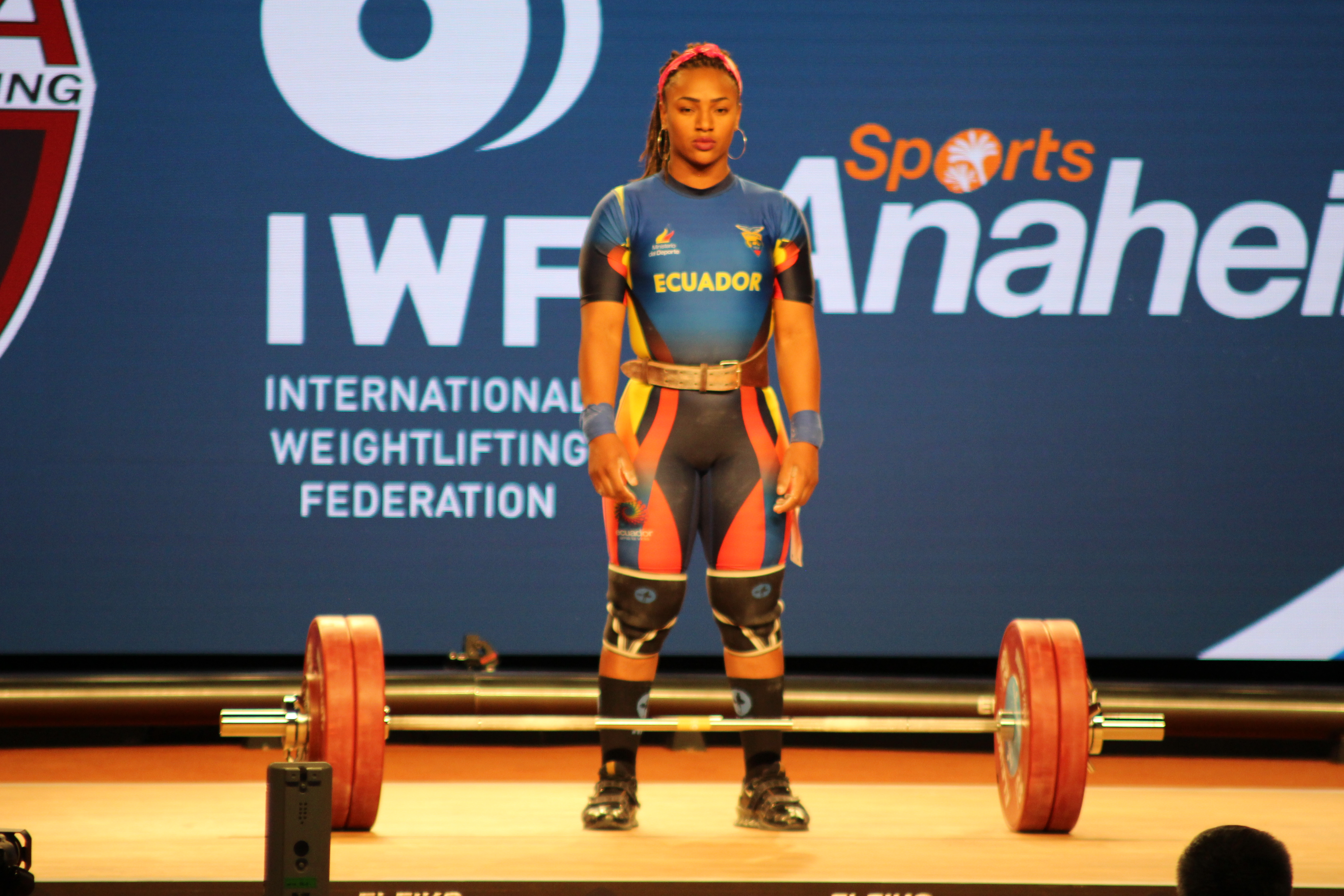
- Salazar at the Weightlifting Championships in Anaheim, California in 2017

Personal information
- Born: 9 August 1997 (age 29) Pusir Grande, Carchi Province, Ecuador
- Weight: 85.15 kg (188 lb)

Sport
- Country: Ecuador
- Sport: Weightlifting
- Event: –87 kg
- Club: Federacion Deportiva del Carchi
Medal record
Representing Ecuador
Olympic Games
| Silver medal – second place | 2020 Tokyo | –87 kg |
World Championships
| Bronze medal – third place | 2018 Ashgabat | –81 kg |
| Bronze medal – third place | 2019 Pattaya | –87 kg |
| Bronze medal – third place | 2022 Bogotá | –81 kg |
Pan American Games
| Bronze medal – third place | 2019 Lima | –87 kg |
Bolivarian Games
| Gold medal – first place | 2022 Valledupar | –87 kg S |
| Gold medal – first place | 2022 Valledupar | –87 kg CJ |

Tamara Yajaira Salazar Arce (born 9 August 1997) is an Ecuadorian weightlifter. She won a silver medal at the 2020 Tokyo 87 kg Olympic competition, and silver and bronze medals at the 2018 World Weightlifting Championships.

== Career ==
In the Weightlifting World Championship in 2018, Ecuadorian Tamara Salazar won silver and bronze. Salazar, raised 137 kilos (302.03 pounds) in the Clean & Jerk and won the silver medal. The Belarusian Darya Naumava raised the same, but took the gold for having less body weight. The bronze went to Lidia Valentín of Spain with 136 kg. In the total, Salazar completed 242 kg and took bronze. Valentín (249 kg) and Naumava (245 kg) took gold and silver respectively.

Salazar won the silver medal in the women's 87 kg event at the 2020 Summer Olympics in Tokyo, Japan.

Salazar won the gold medal in the women's 87 kg event at the 2022 Pan American Weightlifting Championships held in Bogotá, Colombia. She also won medals in the Snatch and Clean & Jerk events in this competition.

She won the bronze medal in the women's 81 kg event at the 2023 Pan American Weightlifting Championships held in Bariloche, Argentina.

== Major results ==
| Year | Venue | Weight | Snatch (kg) | | | | Clean & Jerk (kg) | | | | Total | Rank |
| Year | Venue | Weight | 1 | 2 | 3 | Rank | 1 | 2 | 3 | Rank | Total | Rank |
Olympic Games
| 2021 | Tokyo, Japan | 87 kg | 108 | 111 | 113 | 3 | 144 | 147 | 150 | 2 | 263 | 2nd place, silver medalist(s) |
World Championships
| 2017 | Anaheim, United States | 90 kg | 95 | 99 | 101 | 8 | 125 | 130 | 133 | 6 | 234 | 6 |
| 2018 | Ashgabat, Turkmenistan | 81 kg | 101 | 105 | ~~107~~ | 5 | 133 | ~~136~~ | 137 | 2nd place, silver medalist(s) | 242 | 3rd place, bronze medalist(s) |
| 2019 | Pattaya, Thailand | 87 kg | 105 | 108 | ~~111~~ | 4 | 140 | 144 | ~~147~~ | 3rd place, bronze medalist(s) | 252 | 3rd place, bronze medalist(s) |
