= Aremi Fuentes =

Mexican weightlifter (born 1993)

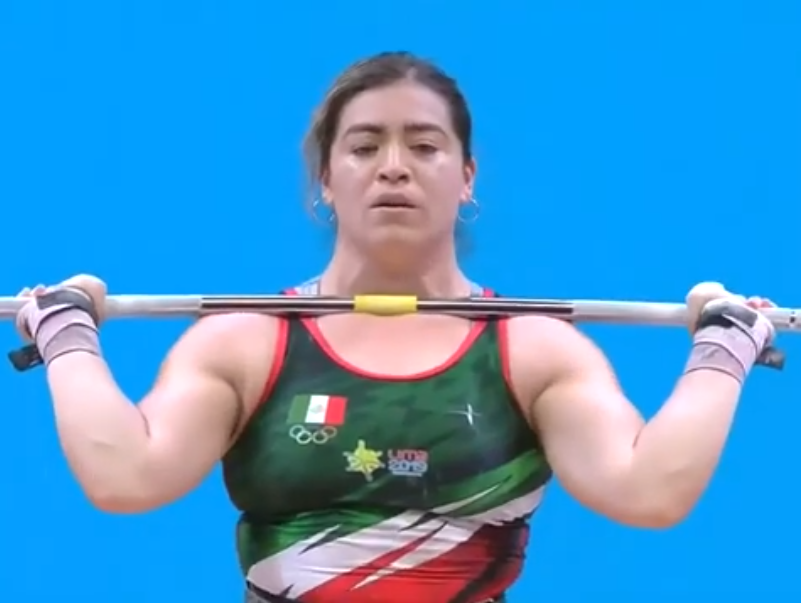
- At the 2019 World Weightlifting Championships

Personal information
- Full name: Aremi Fuentes Zavala
- Born: 23 May 1993 (age 33) Tonalá, Chiapas, Mexico
- Height: 1.60 m (5 ft 3 in)
- Weight: 68 kg (150 lb)

Sport
- Country: Mexico
- Sport: Weightlifting
- Team: National team
Medal record
Representing Mexico
Olympic Games
Bronze medal – third place	2020 Tokyo	–76 kg
Pan American Games
Silver medal – second place	2019 Lima	–76 kg
Bronze medal – third place	2011 Guadalajara	69 kg
Bronze medal – third place	2015 Toronto	69 kg
- Updated on 31 August 2016

Aremi Fuentes Zavala (Note: In this Spanish name, the first or paternal surname is Fuentes and the second or maternal family name is Zavala.) (born 23 May 1993) is a Mexican weightlifter. She competes in the 69 and 76 kg categories, in addition to representing Mexico in international competitions.

== Career ==
She competed at world championships, including at the 2015 World Weightlifting Championships.

In 2021, Fuentes competed at the 2020 Summer Olympics in the women's 76 kg weightlifting competition by lifting 108 kg and 137 kg in the snatch and clean & jerk phases respectively for a total of 245 kg to win the bronze medal, being this the third bronze one earned for her country.

== Major results ==
Year	Venue	Weight	Snatch (kg)				Clean & Jerk (kg)				Total	Rank
Year	Venue	Weight	1	2	3	Rank	1	2	3	Rank	Total	Rank
Olympic Games
2020	Tokyo, Japan	76 kg	105	108	~~110~~	3	135	137	~~139~~	3	245	3rd place, bronze medalist(s)
World Championships
2015	Houston, United States	69 kg	~~97~~	97	99	20	~~123~~	123	~~127~~	20	222	20
2011	Paris, France	69 kg	92	95	~~97~~	24	115	120	~~123~~	19	215	20
