= IWF World Cup =

Weightlifting tournament

- Status: active
- Genre: sporting event
- Date: mid-year
- Frequency: annual
- Country: varying
- Inaugurated: 2019
- Organiser: IWF

The IWF World Cup in weightlifting is organised by the International Weightlifting Federation (IWF), as well as other weightlifting federations.

== Edition ==
| Year | Edition | | Host city | Events |
| Year | M | W | Host city | Events |
|---|---|---|---|---|
| 2019 | 1 | 1 | Fuzhou, China | 20 |
| 2019 | 2 | 2 | Tianjin, China | 20 |
| 2020 | 3 | 3 | Rome, Italy | 20 |
| 2024 | 4 | 4 | Phuket, Thailand | 20 |
