= 2015 World Weightlifting Championships – Women's 69 kg =

The women's 69 kilograms event at the 2015 World Weightlifting Championships was held on 24–26 November 2015 in Houston, United States.

== Schedule ==
Date	Time	Event
24 November 2015	21:25	Group D
25 November 2015	09:00	Group C
25 November 2015	19:25	Group B
26 November 2015	15:25	Group A

== Medalists ==
Event	Gold		Silver		Bronze	
Snatch	Xiang Yanmei (CHN)	120 kg	Anastasia Romanova (RUS)	116 kg	Zhazira Zhapparkul (KAZ)	116 kg
Clean & Jerk	Xiang Yanmei (CHN)	143 kg	Zhazira Zhapparkul (KAZ)	140 kg	Anastasia Romanova (RUS)	137 kg
Total	Xiang Yanmei (CHN)	263 kg	Zhazira Zhapparkul (KAZ)	256 kg	Anastasia Romanova (RUS)	253 kg

== Records ==
Prior to this competition, the existing world records were as follows.

World record	Snatch	~~Liu Chunhong (CHN)~~; Oxana Slivenko (RUS)	~~128 kg~~ 123 kg	~~Beijing, China~~; Santo Domingo, Dominican	~~13 August 2008~~; 4 October 2006
World record	Clean & Jerk	~~Liu Chunhong (CHN)~~; Zarema Kasaeva (RUS)	~~158 kg~~ 157 kg	~~Beijing, China~~; Doha, Qatar	~~13 August 2008~~; 13 November 2005
World record	Total	~~Liu Chunhong (CHN)~~; Oxana Slivenko (RUS)	~~286 kg~~ 276 kg	~~Beijing, China~~; Chiang Mai, Thailand	~~13 August 2008~~; 24 September 2007

- Liu Chunhong's world records were rescinded in 2017.

== Results ==
Rank	Athlete	Group	Body weight	Snatch (kg)				Clean & Jerk (kg)				Total
Rank	Athlete	Group	Body weight	1	2	3	Rank	1	2	3	Rank	Total
1st place, gold medalist(s)	Xiang Yanmei (CHN)	A	69.00	117	120	~~123~~	1st place, gold medalist(s)	143	~~148~~	~~148~~	1st place, gold medalist(s)	263
2nd place, silver medalist(s)	Zhazira Zhapparkul (KAZ)	A	68.98	112	116	~~120~~	3rd place, bronze medalist(s)	~~140~~	140	~~147~~	2nd place, silver medalist(s)	256
3rd place, bronze medalist(s)	Anastasia Romanova (RUS)	A	68.60	112	116	~~118~~	2nd place, silver medalist(s)	135	137	~~139~~	3rd place, bronze medalist(s)	253
4	Sara Ahmed (EGY)	A	68.08	105	110	~~112~~	5	135	~~138~~	~~138~~	5	245
5	Dzina Sazanavets (BLR)	A	68.79	105	110	~~115~~	6	126	131	134	6	244
6	Mönkhjantsangiin Ankhtsetseg (MGL)	A	67.95	110	~~116~~	~~116~~	4	133	~~137~~	~~139~~	8	243
7	Maryna Shkermankova (BLR)	A	67.93	103	108	~~111~~	7	128	133	~~138~~	7	241
8	Maiya Maneza (KAZ)	A	66.23	100	~~105~~	~~107~~	14	130	135	~~140~~	4	235
9	Manzurakhon Mamasalieva (UZB)	B	68.64	96	99	102	12	126	131	~~135~~	9	233
10	Neisi Dájomes (ECU)	C	68.72	98	~~102~~	103	9	125	130	~~132~~	10	233
11	Anastassiya Ibrahimli (AZE)	B	68.73	~~100~~	100	~~105~~	17	120	127	130	11	230
12	Nazik Avdalyan (ARM)	B	68.75	~~100~~	100	105	8	125	~~129~~	~~129~~	16	230
13	Ruth Kasirye (NOR)	B	68.81	~~101~~	101	103	11	123	126	~~131~~	14	229
14	Mattie Rogers (USA)	B	67.33	97	100	~~102~~	15	120	123	126	12	226
15	Sheila Ramos (ESP)	C	68.97	95	100	102	13	115	120	124	18	226
16	Anacarmen Torres (MEX)	B	67.52	98	~~101~~	~~101~~	21	~~124~~	124	126	13	224
17	Florina Hulpan (ROU)	B	67.64	~~96~~	96	99	18	120	125	~~127~~	15	224
18	Carita Thorén (SWE)	B	68.26	97	100	~~102~~	16	118	~~122~~	122	20	222
19	Aremi Fuentes (MEX)	C	68.41	~~97~~	97	99	19	~~123~~	123	~~127~~	19	222
20	Marie-Ève Beauchemin-Nadeau (CAN)	C	68.97	93	97	~~100~~	23	121	124	~~126~~	17	221
21	Patrycja Piechowiak (POL)	B	68.99	94	~~98~~	99	20	118	~~122~~	122	21	221
22	Mariya Khlyan (UKR)	C	68.91	95	~~99~~	~~99~~	27	117	~~123~~	~~123~~	23	212
23	Dayana Chirinos (VEN)	C	68.76	92	~~94~~	94	28	113	115	117	22	211
24	Marie-Josée Arès-Pilon (CAN)	D	67.85	93	95	~~97~~	25	111	114	~~116~~	26	209
25	Mandy Treutlein (GER)	C	67.89	~~93~~	93	95	26	109	112	~~115~~	29	207
26	Assiya İpek (TUR)	D	68.14	89	92	~~94~~	30	110	113	115	24	207
27	Diah Ayu Permatasari (INA)	C	67.61	93	~~96~~	96	24	109	~~113~~	~~113~~	31	205
28	Maria Grazia Alemanno (ITA)	D	68.25	89	91	93	29	110	112	~~115~~	30	205
29	Emily Godley (GBR)	C	65.62	90	~~93~~	~~94~~	32	114	~~118~~	~~119~~	25	204
30	Sarah Davies (GBR)	C	65.17	86	89	~~91~~	34	~~113~~	113	~~117~~	27	202
31	Aslıhan Ceyhan (TUR)	C	68.47	87	89	~~91~~	36	110	113	~~115~~	28	202
32	Kiana Elliott (AUS)	D	66.41	~~85~~	85	89	35	103	107	~~111~~	33	196
33	Anníe Mist Þórisdóttir (ISL)	D	68.05	78	84	88	37	100	105	108	32	196
34	Andrea Miller (NZL)	D	68.72	~~87~~	87	90	33	106	~~110~~	~~110~~	35	196
35	Apolonia Vaivai (FIJ)	D	68.88	85	88	91	31	105	~~110~~	~~110~~	37	196
36	Lenka Kenisová (CZE)	D	67.82	~~85~~	85	~~87~~	38	106	~~108~~	~~109~~	34	191
37	Katrín Davíðsdóttir (ISL)	D	68.68	78	84	~~87~~	39	90	94	~~98~~	39	178
38	Karina Hauge (DEN)	D	68.33	74	77	~~79~~	40	95	99	~~101~~	38	176
—	Ghada Hassine (TUN)	B	68.76	~~101~~	101	103	10	~~122~~	~~122~~	~~122~~	—	—
—	Hung Wan-ting (TPE)	B	68.90	98	~~101~~	~~101~~	22	~~124~~	~~124~~	~~124~~	—	—
—	Anni Vuohijoki (FIN)	D	67.43	~~86~~	~~87~~	~~89~~	—	105	~~111~~	~~111~~	36	—
DQ	Olga Afanasieva (RUS)	A	68.34	110	~~115~~	115	—	~~136~~	~~136~~	136	—	251
DQ	Ryo Un-hui (PRK)	A	68.48	~~111~~	111	116	—	135	~~138~~	~~138~~	—	251
