= 2013 World Weightlifting Championships – Women's 69 kg =

Weightlifting competition

The women's competition in the –69 kg division was held on 23–24 October 2013 in Centennial Hall, Wrocław, Poland.

== Schedule ==
Date	Time	Event
23 October 2013	12:00	Group C
24 October 2013	10:00	Group B
24 October 2013	16:55	Group A

== Medalists ==
Event	Gold		Silver		Bronze	
Snatch	Xiang Yanmei (CHN)	123 kg	Ryo Un-hui (PRK)	119 kg	Oxana Slivenko (RUS)	118 kg
Clean & Jerk	Xiang Yanmei (CHN)	148 kg	Dzina Sazanavets (BLR)	143 kg	Ryo Un-hui (PRK)	143 kg
Total	Xiang Yanmei (CHN)	271 kg	Ryo Un-hui (PRK)	262 kg	Dzina Sazanavets (BLR)	259 kg

== Records ==
Prior to this competition, the existing world records were as follows.

World Record	Snatch	~~Liu Chunhong (CHN)~~; Oxana Slivenko (RUS)	~~128 kg~~ 123 kg	~~Beijing, China~~; Santo Domingo, Dominican	~~13 August 2008~~; 4 October 2006
World Record	Clean & Jerk	~~Liu Chunhong (CHN)~~; Zarema Kasaeva (RUS)	~~158 kg~~ 157 kg	~~Beijing, China~~; Doha, Qatar	~~13 August 2008~~; 13 November 2005
World Record	Total	~~Liu Chunhong (CHN)~~; Oxana Slivenko (RUS)	~~286 kg~~ 276 kg	~~Beijing, China~~; Chiang Mai, Thailand	~~13 August 2008~~; 24 September 2007

- Liu Chunhong's world records were rescinded in 2017.

== Results ==
Rank	Athlete	Group	Body weight	Snatch (kg)				Clean & Jerk (kg)				Total
Rank	Athlete	Group	Body weight	1	2	3	Rank	1	2	3	Rank	Total
1st place, gold medalist(s)	Xiang Yanmei (CHN)	A	68.51	117	120	123	1st place, gold medalist(s)	145	~~148~~	148	1st place, gold medalist(s)	271
2nd place, silver medalist(s)	Ryo Un-hui (PRK)	A	68.67	115	~~118~~	119	2nd place, silver medalist(s)	~~143~~	143	~~147~~	3rd place, bronze medalist(s)	262
3rd place, bronze medalist(s)	Dzina Sazanavets (BLR)	A	68.27	111	116	~~119~~	4	138	143	~~146~~	2nd place, silver medalist(s)	259
4	Oxana Slivenko (RUS)	A	68.24	110	115	118	3rd place, bronze medalist(s)	~~140~~	140	~~144~~	4	258
5	Svetlana Shimkova (RUS)	A	68.27	105	110	~~114~~	5	130	135	~~139~~	5	245
6	Leydi Solís (COL)	A	68.70	100	~~105~~	105	8	125	130	135	6	240
7	Mercedes Pérez (COL)	A	67.92	~~100~~	100	105	7	130	~~135~~	~~135~~	7	235
8	Nadiya Myronyuk (UKR)	A	68.83	104	~~106~~	~~106~~	9	124	128	~~132~~	9	232
9	Zhazira Zhapparkul (KAZ)	B	68.05	98	103	~~105~~	10	123	~~128~~	128	8	231
10	Manzurakhon Mamasalieva (UZB)	B	68.08	95	~~99~~	99	11	~~122~~	122	127	10	226
11	Martha Malla (ECU)	C	68.52	90	94	97	12	115	120	~~124~~	11	217
12	Dayana Chirinos (VEN)	B	68.22	~~95~~	~~95~~	95	15	115	118	~~120~~	12	213
13	Jenny Arthur (USA)	B	68.64	95	~~99~~	~~99~~	16	~~117~~	117	~~123~~	13	212
14	Liliane Menezes (BRA)	B	68.79	~~90~~	90	94	19	117	~~121~~	~~121~~	14	211
15	Solenny Villasmil (VEN)	B	64.36	94	~~97~~	~~97~~	17	~~116~~	116	~~119~~	15	210
16	Marie-Josée Arès-Pilon (CAN)	C	68.02	92	94	96	13	~~112~~	112	114	16	210
17	Allie Henry (USA)	C	68.17	92	96	~~99~~	14	108	112	~~114~~	18	208
18	Natasha Perdue (GBR)	C	68.62	87	91	94	18	105	110	~~115~~	21	204
19	Mariya Khlyan (UKR)	B	68.66	89	~~91~~	91	21	106	109	112	19	203
20	Sümeyye Kentli (TUR)	B	67.31	85	89	~~91~~	22	110	113	~~115~~	17	202
21	Assiya İpek (TUR)	C	67.12	87	91	~~93~~	20	103	108	110	20	201
22	Sofía Angulo (ECU)	C	68.40	~~82~~	82	87	23	~~105~~	105	~~110~~	23	192
23	Anastassiya Khalikova (KAZ)	C	66.66	75	80	~~85~~	24	95	100	105	22	185
24	Anni Vuohijoki (FIN)	C	68.61	76	79	~~82~~	25	97	~~102~~	~~103~~	24	176
—	Maryna Shkermankova (BLR)	A	67.93	108	~~113~~	~~113~~	6	~~135~~	~~140~~	~~140~~	—	—
