= 2014 World Weightlifting Championships – Women's 69 kg =

The women's 69 kilograms event at the 2014 World Weightlifting Championships was held on 13–14 November 2014 in Baluan Sholak Sports Palace, Almaty, Kazakhstan.

== Schedule ==
Date	Time	Event
13 November 2014	11:00	Group C
13 November 2014	13:00	Group B
14 November 2014	16:00	Group A

== Medalists ==
Event	Gold		Silver		Bronze	
Snatch	Ryo Un-hui (PRK)	120 kg	Chen Youjuan (CHN)	118 kg	Zhazira Zhapparkul (KAZ)	118 kg
Clean & Jerk	Ryo Un-hui (PRK)	145 kg	Zhazira Zhapparkul (KAZ)	144 kg	Dzina Sazanavets (BLR)	143 kg
Total	Ryo Un-hui (PRK)	265 kg	Zhazira Zhapparkul (KAZ)	262 kg	Chen Youjuan (CHN)	261 kg

== Records ==
Prior to this competition, the existing world records were as follows.

World Record	Snatch	~~Liu Chunhong (CHN)~~; Oxana Slivenko (RUS)	~~128 kg~~ 123 kg	~~Beijing, China~~; Santo Domingo, Dominican	~~13 August 2008~~; 4 October 2006
World Record	Clean & Jerk	~~Liu Chunhong (CHN)~~; Zarema Kasaeva (RUS)	~~158 kg~~ 157 kg	~~Beijing, China~~; Doha, Qatar	~~13 August 2008~~; 13 November 2005
World Record	Total	~~Liu Chunhong (CHN)~~; Oxana Slivenko (RUS)	~~286 kg~~ 276 kg	~~Beijing, China~~; Chiang Mai, Thailand	~~13 August 2008~~; 24 September 2007

- Liu Chunhong's world records were rescinded in 2017.

== Results ==
Rank	Athlete	Group	Body weight	Snatch (kg)				Clean & Jerk (kg)				Total
Rank	Athlete	Group	Body weight	1	2	3	Rank	1	2	3	Rank	Total
1st place, gold medalist(s)	Ryo Un-hui (PRK)	A	68.61	115	120	~~122~~	1st place, gold medalist(s)	141	145	~~147~~	1st place, gold medalist(s)	265
2nd place, silver medalist(s)	Zhazira Zhapparkul (KAZ)	A	68.41	113	~~118~~	118	3rd place, bronze medalist(s)	140	~~144~~	144	2nd place, silver medalist(s)	262
3rd place, bronze medalist(s)	Chen Youjuan (CHN)	A	68.39	118	~~121~~	~~123~~	2nd place, silver medalist(s)	138	~~143~~	143	4	261
4	Dzina Sazanavets (BLR)	A	68.26	112	~~117~~	117	4	135	143	~~144~~	3rd place, bronze medalist(s)	260
5	Leydi Solís (COL)	A	68.32	~~102~~	~~102~~	102	9	130	135	~~138~~	5	237
6	Milka Maneva (BUL)	A	66.70	~~98~~	98	102	8	129	132	~~135~~	6	234
7	Olga Afanasieva (RUS)	B	67.37	101	105	107	5	123	~~127~~	127	7	234
8	Maiya Maneza (KAZ)	A	66.74	95	100	105	7	126	~~132~~	~~133~~	8	231
9	Mönkhjantsangiin Ankhtsetseg (MGL)	B	68.44	94	100	107	6	124	~~129~~	~~129~~	11	231
10	Meline Daluzyan (ARM)	A	68.62	97	102	~~104~~	10	120	125	~~130~~	10	227
11	Kim Su-hyeon (KOR)	B	68.35	97	~~101~~	101	12	~~125~~	~~125~~	125	9	226
12	Ruth Kasirye (NOR)	B	68.21	~~101~~	~~101~~	101	11	122	~~126~~	~~126~~	13	223
13	Anastasiya Mikhalenka (BLR)	B	67.87	91	96	100	13	115	~~122~~	122	12	222
14	Jenny Arthur (USA)	A	68.32	~~98~~	98	~~102~~	14	120	~~125~~	~~126~~	16	218
15	Mariya Khlyan (UKR)	B	67.43	93	96	~~99~~	17	117	~~121~~	121	14	217
16	Liliane Menezes (BRA)	B	68.63	90	93	~~95~~	18	115	121	~~125~~	15	214
17	Samar Said (EGY)	B	68.10	92	97	~~100~~	16	116	~~121~~	~~121~~	17	213
18	Natasha Perdue (GBR)	C	67.70	84	88	90	20	106	110	113	18	203
19	Maria Grazia Alemanno (ITA)	C	67.99	89	91	92	19	108	~~111~~	~~111~~	22	200
20	Sheila Ramos (ESP)	C	68.73	87	90	~~92~~	21	~~108~~	108	~~112~~	23	198
21	Kristel Ngarlem (CAN)	C	66.84	87	~~89~~	~~90~~	22	110	~~114~~	~~114~~	21	197
22	Hatice Demirel (TUR)	C	68.69	85	~~88~~	~~88~~	24	112	~~116~~	~~116~~	19	197
23	Lenka Kenisová (CZE)	C	65.61	~~84~~	84	~~87~~	25	105	108	111	20	195
24	Renny Darlina (INA)	C	68.18	83	87	~~90~~	23	~~103~~	~~103~~	103	25	190
25	Anni Vuohijoki (FIN)	C	67.92	84	~~86~~	~~86~~	26	105	~~108~~	~~109~~	24	189
26	Batboldyn Enkhtamir (MGL)	C	68.67	~~76~~	76	~~79~~	27	99	—	—	26	175
27	Mirjam Polgár (HUN)	C	68.28	71	~~74~~	~~74~~	29	90	~~95~~	~~95~~	27	161
28	Mita Overvliet (NED)	C	68.84	71	73	~~75~~	28	~~86~~	~~86~~	86	28	159
—	Patrycja Piechowiak (POL)	B	68.61	95	~~98~~	98	15	~~115~~	~~115~~	~~115~~	—	—
—	Assiya İpek (TUR)	C	68.18	~~88~~	~~88~~	~~88~~	—	—	—	—	—	—
DQ	Manzurakhon Mamasalieva (UZB)	B	68.38	~~95~~	95	100	—	122	127	131	—	—
