= Weightlifting at the 2018 Asian Games – Women's 69 kg =

Women's 69 kg at the 2018 Asian Games
- Venue: Jakarta International Expo
- Date: 25 August 2018
- Competitors: 8 from 6 nations

Medalists
gold medal	Rim Un-sim	North Korea
silver medal	Hung Wan-ting	Chinese Taipei
bronze medal	Mun Yu-ra	South Korea

The Women's 69 kilograms event at the 2018 Asian Games took place on 25 August 2018 at the Jakarta International Expo Hall A.

== Schedule ==
All times are Western Indonesia Time (UTC+07:00)

Date	Time	Event
Saturday, 25 August 2018	17:00	Group A

== Records ==
Prior to this competition, the existing world, Asian and Games records were as follows.

World Record	Snatch	Oxana Slivenko (RUS)	123 kg	Santo Domingo, Dominican Rep.	4 October 2006
World Record	Clean & Jerk	Zarema Kasaeva (RUS)	157 kg	Doha, Qatar	13 November 2005
World Record	Total	Oxana Slivenko (RUS)	276 kg	Chiang Mai, Thailand	24 September 2007
Asian Record	Snatch	Xiang Yanmei (CHN)	123 kg	Wrocław, Poland	24 October 2013
Asian Record	Clean & Jerk	Liu Haixia (CHN)	154 kg	Doha, Qatar	13 November 2005
Asian Record	Total	Liu Chunhong (CHN)	275 kg	Athens, Greece	19 August 2004
Games Record	Snatch	Ryo Un-hui (PRK)	121 kg	Incheon, South Korea	24 September 2014
Games Record	Clean & Jerk	Liu Haixia (CHN)	150 kg	Doha, Qatar	4 December 2006
Games Record	Total	Xiang Yanmei (CHN)	268 kg	Incheon, South Korea	24 September 2014

== Results ==
Rank	Athlete	Group	Snatch (kg)				Clean & Jerk (kg)				Total
Rank	Athlete	Group	1	2	3	Result	1	2	3	Result	Total
1st place, gold medalist(s)	Rim Un-sim (PRK)	A	105	~~109~~	109	109	130	134	137	137	246
2nd place, silver medalist(s)	Hung Wan-ting (TPE)	A	98	101	103	103	~~127~~	127	130	130	233
3rd place, bronze medalist(s)	Mun Yu-ra (KOR)	A	96	~~101~~	101	101	125	~~127~~	130	130	231
4	Kim Su-hyeon (KOR)	A	97	~~101~~	~~101~~	97	~~125~~	~~130~~	130	130	227
5	Liu Lan-yin (TPE)	A	95	~~98~~	99	99	115	123	126	126	225
6	Yurifah Melsandi (INA)	A	86	~~90~~	~~93~~	86	106	110	115	115	201
7	Miku Ishii (JPN)	A	85	~~90~~	~~90~~	85	107	112	115	115	200
8	Kristel Macrohon (PHI)	A	~~85~~	~~85~~	85	85	110	~~115~~	~~115~~	110	195
