= 2006 World Weightlifting Championships – Women's 69 kg =

The 2006 World Weightlifting Championships were held in Santo Domingo, Dominican Republic from 30 September to 7 October. The women's 69 kilograms division was staged on 3 and 4 October 2006.

== Schedule ==
Date	Time	Event
3 October 2006	18:00	Group C
4 October 2006	12:00	Group B
4 October 2006	16:00	Group A

== Medalists ==
Event	Gold		Silver		Bronze	
Snatch	Oxana Slivenko (RUS)	123 kg	Liu Chunhong (CHN)	111 kg	Tatiana Matveeva (RUS)	110 kg
Clean & Jerk	Oxana Slivenko (RUS)	140 kg	Jeane Lassen (CAN)	136 kg	Tatiana Matveeva (RUS)	135 kg
Total	Oxana Slivenko (RUS)	263 kg	Tatiana Matveeva (RUS)	245 kg	Jeane Lassen (CAN)	238 kg

== Records ==
Prior to this competition, the existing world records were as follows.

World Record	Snatch	Liu Chunhong (CHN)	122 kg	Athens, Greece	19 August 2004
World Record	Clean & Jerk	Zarema Kasaeva (RUS)	157 kg	Doha, Qatar	13 November 2005
World Record	Total	Liu Chunhong (CHN)	275 kg	Athens, Greece	19 August 2004

== Results ==
Rank	Athlete	Group	Body weight	Snatch (kg)				Clean & Jerk (kg)				Total
Rank	Athlete	Group	Body weight	1	2	3	Rank	1	2	3	Rank	Total
1st place, gold medalist(s)	Oxana Slivenko (RUS)	A	68.53	115	119	123	1st place, gold medalist(s)	140	~~147~~	~~147~~	1st place, gold medalist(s)	263
2nd place, silver medalist(s)	Tatiana Matveeva (RUS)	A	68.95	~~108~~	108	110	3rd place, bronze medalist(s)	135	~~145~~	~~145~~	3rd place, bronze medalist(s)	245
3rd place, bronze medalist(s)	Jeane Lassen (CAN)	A	68.64	~~102~~	102	~~106~~	5	129	131	136	2nd place, silver medalist(s)	238
4	Nataliya Davydova (UKR)	A	68.52	103	107	108	4	123	126	129	4	237
5	Kim Mi-kyung (KOR)	A	68.53	94	~~98~~	100	7	124	~~128~~	~~130~~	5	224
6	Madeleine Yamechi (FRA)	A	68.75	97	~~100~~	~~100~~	10	121	~~124~~	124	6	221
7	Nazik Avdalyan (ARM)	A	68.81	93	97	100	8	117	121	~~125~~	7	221
8	Cinthya Domínguez (MEX)	B	69.00	97	101	~~102~~	6	120	~~125~~	~~125~~	9	221
9	Hwang Pu-lum (KOR)	A	68.69	90	95	98	9	120	~~125~~	~~125~~	8	218
10	Yuliya Artemova (UKR)	B	67.87	93	96	~~98~~	11	113	116	118	10	214
11	Tulia Medina (COL)	B	68.18	95	~~100~~	~~100~~	13	115	~~118~~	~~118~~	13	210
12	Nadia Szamańska (POL)	B	68.88	93	96	~~98~~	12	~~112~~	112	~~114~~	16	208
13	Zlatina Atanasova (BUL)	B	64.40	90	~~93~~	~~93~~	15	115	~~118~~	~~118~~	12	205
14	Mayu Hashida (JPN)	B	63.78	85	88	~~90~~	17	112	114	116	11	204
15	Aksana Zalatarova (BLR)	B	68.31	85	90	92	14	105	110	112	15	204
16	Rika Saito (JPN)	B	65.65	85	87	~~89~~	20	110	113	~~117~~	14	200
17	Volha Nedarezava (BLR)	C	68.99	80	85	90	16	105	110	~~115~~	19	200
18	Marie-Ève Beauchemin-Nadeau (CAN)	C	66.79	84	~~88~~	88	18	~~105~~	105	110	17	198
19	Teresa Gaume (USA)	B	68.94	82	85	87	22	105	110	~~113~~	18	197
20	Leuzkis Farías (VEN)	B	67.18	84	88	~~90~~	19	107	~~113~~	~~113~~	21	195
21	Todorka Ivanova (BUL)	B	68.77	87	~~90~~	~~90~~	21	108	~~110~~	~~110~~	20	195
22	Raquel Alonso (ESP)	C	68.40	75	78	~~82~~	24	95	100	103	22	181
23	Natasha Perdue (WAL)	C	66.88	75	~~77~~	77	25	93	97	~~98~~	23	174
24	Manuela Torazza (ITA)	C	65.53	~~76~~	76	79	23	94	~~99~~	~~99~~	24	173
25	Alexandra Molnár (HUN)	C	68.10	75	~~79~~	—	26	93	~~98~~	~~98~~	25	168
—	Liu Chunhong (CHN)	A	68.57	111	~~113~~	~~114~~	2nd place, silver medalist(s)	—	—	—	—	—

== New records ==
Snatch	123 kg	Oxana Slivenko (RUS)	WR
