= 2005 World Weightlifting Championships – Women's 69 kg =

The 2005 World Weightlifting Championships were held in Doha, Qatar from 9 November to 17 November. The women's 69 kilograms division was staged on 13 November 2005.

== Schedule ==
Date	Time	Event
13 November 2005	13:00	Group B
13 November 2005	17:30	Group A

== Medalists ==
Event	Gold		Silver		Bronze	
Snatch	Liu Haixia (CHN)	120 kg	Zarema Kasaeva (RUS)	118 kg	Olga Kiseleva (RUS)	110 kg
Clean & Jerk	Zarema Kasaeva (RUS)	157 kg	Liu Haixia (CHN)	154 kg	Olga Kiseleva (RUS)	140 kg
Total	Zarema Kasaeva (RUS)	275 kg	Liu Haixia (CHN)	274 kg	Olga Kiseleva (RUS)	250 kg

== Records ==
Prior to this competition, the existing world records were as follows.

World record	Snatch	Liu Chunhong (CHN)	122 kg	Athens, Greece	19 August 2004
World record	Clean & Jerk	Liu Chunhong (CHN)	153 kg	Athens, Greece	19 August 2004
World record	Total	Liu Chunhong (CHN)	275 kg	Athens, Greece	19 August 2004

== Results ==
Rank	Athlete	Group	Body weight	Snatch (kg)				Clean & Jerk (kg)				Total
Rank	Athlete	Group	Body weight	1	2	3	Rank	1	2	3	Rank	Total
1st place, gold medalist(s)	Zarema Kasaeva (RUS)	A	68.94	~~118~~	~~118~~	118	2nd place, silver medalist(s)	145	153	157	1st place, gold medalist(s)	275
2nd place, silver medalist(s)	Liu Haixia (CHN)	A	68.55	110	118	120	1st place, gold medalist(s)	145	150	154	2nd place, silver medalist(s)	274
3rd place, bronze medalist(s)	Olga Kiseleva (RUS)	A	68.10	110	~~115~~	~~115~~	3rd place, bronze medalist(s)	135	140	~~150~~	3rd place, bronze medalist(s)	250
4	Ubaldina Valoyes (COL)	A	68.23	95	100	103	6	122	125	128	4	231
5	Jeane Lassen (CAN)	A	68.60	97	100	~~102~~	7	~~126~~	126	~~132~~	5	226
6	Kim Mi-kyung (KOR)	A	68.99	95	100	~~103~~	8	123	~~128~~	~~129~~	6	223
7	Nataliya Davydova (UKR)	A	68.21	100	103	~~105~~	5	115	~~121~~	~~123~~	10	218
8	Luz Acosta (MEX)	B	67.82	93	~~96~~	~~96~~	9	115	117	119	8	212
9	Monika Devi (IND)	B	66.61	90	~~95~~	~~95~~	11	115	120	~~123~~	7	210
10	Erin Okonek (USA)	B	68.75	88	~~91~~	~~91~~	12	109	114	119	9	207
11	Rika Saito (JPN)	B	66.31	~~85~~	85	90	10	113	~~118~~	~~118~~	11	203
12	Irene Ajambo (UGA)	B	68.45	65	~~70~~	~~70~~	13	85	90	~~93~~	12	155
—	Huang Shih-chun (TPE)	A	68.84	105	~~111~~	~~111~~	4	~~127~~	~~130~~	~~130~~	—	—
DQ	Valeria Fontán (ARG)	A	68.60	~~100~~	~~100~~	100	—	125	130	133	—	—

== New records ==
Clean & Jerk	154 kg	Liu Haixia (CHN)	WR
Clean & Jerk	157 kg	Zarema Kasaeva (RUS)	WR
