= 2011 World Weightlifting Championships – Women's 69 kg =

The women's competition in the light heavyweight (– 69 kg) division was held on 8–9 November 2011.

== Schedule ==
Date	Time	Event
8 November 2011	21:30	Group C
9 November 2011	14:00	Group B
9 November 2011	19:00	Group A

== Medalists ==
Event	Gold		Silver		Bronze	
Snatch	Oxana Slivenko (RUS)	118 kg	Xiang Yanmei (CHN)	116 kg	Huang Shih-hsu (TPE)	116 kg
Clean & Jerk	Oxana Slivenko (RUS)	148 kg	Xiang Yanmei (CHN)	148 kg	Tatiana Matveeva (RUS)	143 kg
Total	Oxana Slivenko (RUS)	266 kg	Xiang Yanmei (CHN)	264 kg	Tatiana Matveeva (RUS)	253 kg

== Records ==
Prior to this competition, the existing world records were as follows.

World Record	Snatch	~~Liu Chunhong (CHN)~~; Oxana Slivenko (RUS)	~~128 kg~~ 123 kg	~~Beijing, China~~; Santo Domingo, Dominican	~~13 August 2008~~; 4 October 2006
World Record	Clean & Jerk	~~Liu Chunhong (CHN)~~; Zarema Kasaeva (RUS)	~~158 kg~~ 157 kg	~~Beijing, China~~; Doha, Qatar	~~13 August 2008~~; 13 November 2005
World Record	Total	~~Liu Chunhong (CHN)~~; Oxana Slivenko (RUS)	~~286 kg~~ 276 kg	~~Beijing, China~~; Chiang Mai, Thailand	~~13 August 2008~~; 24 September 2007

- Liu Chunhong's world records were rescinded in 2017.

== Results ==
Rank	Athlete	Group	Body weight	Snatch (kg)				Clean & Jerk (kg)				Total
Rank	Athlete	Group	Body weight	1	2	3	Rank	1	2	3	Rank	Total
1st place, gold medalist(s)	Oxana Slivenko (RUS)	A	68.37	115	~~118~~	118	1st place, gold medalist(s)	140	145	148	1st place, gold medalist(s)	266
2nd place, silver medalist(s)	Xiang Yanmei (CHN)	A	68.40	110	114	116	2nd place, silver medalist(s)	140	148	~~151~~	2nd place, silver medalist(s)	264
3rd place, bronze medalist(s)	Tatiana Matveeva (RUS)	A	68.63	105	110	~~113~~	4	138	143	~~145~~	3rd place, bronze medalist(s)	253
4	Huang Shih-hsu (TPE)	A	68.45	111	~~116~~	116	3rd place, bronze medalist(s)	130	135	~~140~~	4	251
5	Maryna Shkermankova (BLR)	B	68.14	100	104	107	7	120	126	131	6	238
6	Yuliya Artemova (UKR)	A	67.73	103	~~107~~	107	6	122	127	~~131~~	12	234
7	Mun Yu-ra (KOR)	A	68.69	100	~~105~~	~~105~~	18	125	131	133	5	233
8	Wang Ya-jhen (TPE)	A	68.28	98	102	105	8	~~127~~	~~127~~	127	14	232
9	Irina Nekrassova (KAZ)	A	65.38	100	107	109	5	~~121~~	121	~~129~~	17	230
10	Mercedes Pérez (COL)	B	67.44	95	98	100	12	125	130	~~134~~	7	230
11	Dzina Sazanavets (BLR)	B	68.18	99	103	~~105~~	9	121	126	~~131~~	15	229
12	Sinta Darmariani (INA)	B	67.40	95	~~99~~	99	20	125	129	~~131~~	8	228
13	Zhazira Zhapparkul (KAZ)	A	68.51	100	~~107~~	~~107~~	15	121	126	128	9	228
14	Ewa Mizdal (POL)	A	68.63	97	~~100~~	100	17	124	~~128~~	128	10	228
15	Marie-Ève Beauchemin-Nadeau (CAN)	B	68.87	97	~~100~~	100	19	125	128	~~131~~	11	228
16	Esmat Mansour (EGY)	A	67.95	100	~~105~~	~~105~~	13	122	127	~~129~~	13	227
17	Eszter Krutzler (HUN)	B	68.24	99	~~102~~	102	10	120	124	~~129~~	16	226
18	Iana Ierko (UKR)	B	68.59	101	~~105~~	~~105~~	11	121	~~127~~	~~127~~	18	222
19	Cinthya Domínguez (MEX)	B	68.63	~~100~~	100	~~101~~	16	120	~~123~~	~~123~~	20	220
20	Aremi Fuentes (MEX)	C	68.06	92	95	~~97~~	24	115	120	~~123~~	19	215
21	Sheila Ramos (ESP)	C	68.45	90	95	97	21	112	117	~~120~~	21	214
22	Monika Devi (IND)	B	68.60	92	~~95~~	95	25	~~117~~	117	~~120~~	22	212
23	Rosa Tenorio (ECU)	C	68.30	~~93~~	93	96	23	110	115	~~118~~	25	211
24	Ayano Tani (JPN)	B	68.63	92	95	~~98~~	26	113	116	~~120~~	23	211
25	Marie-Josée Arès-Pilon (CAN)	C	67.32	90	92	94	27	~~110~~	110	112	26	206
26	Janet Georges (SEY)	C	68.00	92	~~96~~	96	22	~~110~~	110	~~115~~	28	206
27	Danica Rue (USA)	C	68.27	~~87~~	87	~~90~~	30	110	115	~~120~~	24	202
28	Anett Goppold (GER)	C	68.46	88	~~90~~	~~90~~	29	106	109	112	27	200
29	Natasha Perdue (GBR)	C	68.11	~~88~~	88	~~93~~	28	~~110~~	~~110~~	110	29	198
30	Liliane Menezes (BRA)	C	68.42	85	~~90~~	~~90~~	32	105	109	~~112~~	30	194
31	Annika Berntsson (SWE)	C	68.59	83	86	~~88~~	31	~~102~~	~~102~~	102	31	188
32	Hapilyn Iro (SOL)	C	67.65	72	77	80	33	92	~~98~~	98	32	178
—	Gaëlle Nayo-Ketchanke (CMR)	A	68.34	100	~~103~~	~~103~~	14	—	—	—	—	—
—	Meline Daluzyan (ARM)	A	68.83	~~116~~	~~116~~	~~116~~	—	—	—	—	—	—
