= Weightlifting at the 2014 Asian Games – Women's 69 kg =

Women's 69 kg at the 2014 Asian Games
- Venue: Moonlight Festival Garden Venue
- Date: 24 September 2014
- Competitors: 7 from 6 nations

Medalists
gold medal	Xiang Yanmei	China
silver medal	Ryo Un-hui	North Korea
bronze medal	Huang Shih-hsu	Chinese Taipei

The women's 69 kilograms event at the 2014 Asian Games took place on 24 September 2014 at Moonlight Festival Garden Weightlifting Venue in Incheon, South Korea.

== Schedule ==
All times are Korea Standard Time (UTC+09:00)

Date	Time	Event
Wednesday, 24 September 2014	16:00	Group A

== Records ==
Prior to this competition, the existing world, Asian and Games records were as follows.

World Record	Snatch	~~Liu Chunhong (CHN)~~; Oxana Slivenko (RUS)	~~128 kg~~ 123 kg	~~Beijing, China~~; Santo Domingo, Dominican Rep.	~~13 August 2008~~; 4 October 2006
World Record	Clean & Jerk	~~Liu Chunhong (CHN)~~; Zarema Kasaeva (RUS)	~~158 kg~~ 157 kg	~~Beijing, China~~; Doha, Qatar	~~13 August 2008~~; 13 November 2005
World Record	Total	~~Liu Chunhong (CHN)~~; Oxana Slivenko (RUS)	~~286 kg~~ 276 kg	~~Beijing, China~~; Chiang Mai, Thailand	~~13 August 2008~~; 24 September 2007
Asian Record	Snatch	~~Liu Chunhong (CHN)~~; Xiang Yanmei (CHN)	~~128 kg~~ 123 kg	~~Beijing, China~~; Wrocław, Poland	~~13 August 2008~~; 24 October 2013
Asian Record	Clean & Jerk	~~Liu Chunhong (CHN)~~; Liu Haixia (CHN)	~~158 kg~~ 154 kg	~~Beijing, China~~; Doha, Qatar	~~13 August 2008~~; 13 November 2005
Asian Record	Total	~~Liu Chunhong (CHN)~~; Liu Chunhong (CHN)	~~286 kg~~ 275 kg	~~Beijing, China~~; Athens, Greece	~~13 August 2008~~; 19 August 2004
Games Record	Snatch	Liu Chunhong (CHN)	115 kg	Busan, South Korea	6 October 2002
Games Record	Clean & Jerk	Liu Haixia (CHN)	150 kg	Doha, Qatar	4 December 2006
Games Record	Total	Liu Haixia (CHN)	265 kg	Doha, Qatar	4 December 2006

- Liu Chunhong's world and Asian records were rescinded in 2017.

== Results ==
Rank	Athlete	Group	Body weight	Snatch (kg)				Clean & Jerk (kg)				Total
Rank	Athlete	Group	Body weight	1	2	3	Result	1	2	3	Result	Total
1st place, gold medalist(s)	Xiang Yanmei (CHN)	A	68.78	118	~~122~~	~~122~~	118	145	150	~~153~~	150	268
2nd place, silver medalist(s)	Ryo Un-hui (PRK)	A	68.52	113	118	121	121	~~140~~	140	141	141	262
3rd place, bronze medalist(s)	Huang Shih-hsu (TPE)	A	68.50	100	105	108	108	121	125	~~128~~	125	233
4	Kim Su-hyeon (KOR)	A	68.77	94	~~100~~	~~100~~	94	122	127	131	131	225
5	Manzurakhon Mamasalieva (UZB)	A	68.76	90	95	99	99	123	~~130~~	~~135~~	123	222
6	Hung Wan-ting (TPE)	A	68.42	95	97	99	97	115	~~120~~	120	120	217
7	Nahil Dyab (SYR)	A	68.25	70	75	78	78	92	97	~~103~~	97	175

== New records ==
The following records were established during the competition.

Snatch	118	Xiang Yanmei (CHN)	GR
Snatch	121	Ryo Un-hui (PRK)	GR
Total	268	Xiang Yanmei (CHN)	GR
