= Weightlifting at the 2010 Asian Games – Women's 69 kg =

Asian Games 2010

Women's 69 kg at the 2010 Asian Games
- Venue: Dongguan Arena
- Date: 17 November 2010
- Competitors: 8 from 7 nations

Medalists
gold medal	Liu Chunhong	China
silver medal	Sinta Darmariani	Indonesia
bronze medal	Wang Ya-jhen	Chinese Taipei

The women's 69 kilograms event at the 2010 Asian Games took place on 17 November 2010 at Dongguan Arena.

== Schedule ==
All times are China Standard Time (UTC+08:00)

Date	Time	Event
Wednesday, 17 November 2010	19:00	Group A

== Records ==
Prior to this competition, the existing world, Asian and Games records were as follows.

World Record	Snatch	~~Liu Chunhong (CHN)~~; Oxana Slivenko (RUS)	~~128 kg~~ 123 kg	~~Beijing, China~~; Santo Domingo, Dominican Rep.	~~13 August 2008~~; 4 October 2006
World Record	Clean & Jerk	~~Liu Chunhong (CHN)~~; Zarema Kasaeva (RUS)	~~158 kg~~ 157 kg	~~Beijing, China~~; Doha, Qatar	~~13 August 2008~~; 13 November 2005
World Record	Total	~~Liu Chunhong (CHN)~~; Oxana Slivenko (RUS)	~~286 kg~~ 276 kg	~~Beijing, China~~; Chiang Mai, Thailand	~~13 August 2008~~; 24 September 2007
Asian Record	Snatch	~~Liu Chunhong (CHN)~~; Liu Chunhong (CHN)	~~128 kg~~ 122 kg	~~Beijing, China~~; Athens, Greece	~~13 August 2008~~; 19 August 2004
Asian Record	Clean & Jerk	~~Liu Chunhong (CHN)~~; Liu Haixia (CHN)	~~158 kg~~ 154 kg	~~Beijing, China~~; Doha, Qatar	~~13 August 2008~~; 13 November 2005
Asian Record	Total	~~Liu Chunhong (CHN)~~; Liu Chunhong (CHN)	~~286 kg~~ 275 kg	~~Beijing, China~~; Athens, Greece	~~13 August 2008~~; 19 August 2004
Games Record	Snatch	Liu Chunhong (CHN)	115 kg	Busan, South Korea	6 October 2002
Games Record	Clean & Jerk	Liu Haixia (CHN)	150 kg	Doha, Qatar	4 December 2006
Games Record	Total	Liu Haixia (CHN)	265 kg	Doha, Qatar	4 December 2006

- Liu Chunhong's world and Asian records were rescinded in 2017.

== Results ==
Legend

- NM — No mark

Rank	Athlete	Group	Body weight	Snatch (kg)				Clean & Jerk (kg)				Total
Rank	Athlete	Group	Body weight	1	2	3	Result	1	2	3	Result	Total
1st place, gold medalist(s)	Liu Chunhong (CHN)	A	68.55	~~106~~	106	110	110	128	132	—	132	242
2nd place, silver medalist(s)	Sinta Darmariani (INA)	A	68.66	98	~~101~~	101	101	129	132	137	137	238
3rd place, bronze medalist(s)	Wang Ya-jhen (TPE)	A	68.84	~~100~~	100	~~103~~	100	~~130~~	130	133	133	233
4	Rim Jong-sim (PRK)	A	65.37	100	~~103~~	103	103	126	~~129~~	129	129	232
5	Huang Pei-yi (TPE)	A	68.77	102	106	~~108~~	106	~~123~~	~~123~~	123	123	229
6	Ayano Tani (JPN)	A	68.71	92	95	97	97	~~118~~	118	121	121	218
7	Monika Devi (IND)	A	68.84	90	95	~~98~~	95	110	117	~~121~~	117	212
—	Bae Seon-mi (KOR)	A	68.52	~~95~~	~~95~~	~~95~~	—	—	—	—	—	NM
