= Weightlifting at the 2016 Summer Olympics – Women's 69 kg =

Women's 69 kg at the Games of the XXXI Olympiad
- Venue: Riocentro
- Date: 10 August 2016
- Competitors: 17 from 16 nations
- Winning total: 261 kg

Medalists
1st place, gold medalist(s)		Xiang Yanmei	China
2nd place, silver medalist(s)		Zhazira Zhapparkul	Kazakhstan
3rd place, bronze medalist(s)		Sara Ahmed	Egypt

The Women's 69 kg weightlifting competitions at the 2016 Summer Olympics in Rio de Janeiro took place from 10 August at the Pavilion 2 of Riocentro.

== Schedule ==
All times are Time in Brazil (UTC-03:00)

Date	Time	Event
10 August 2016	12:30	Group B
10 August 2016	15:30	Group A

== Records ==
Prior to this competition, the existing world and Olympic records were as follows.

World record	Snatch	Liu Chunhong (CHN)	128 kg	Beijing, China	13 August 2008
World record	Clean & Jerk	Liu Chunhong (CHN)	158 kg	Beijing, China	13 August 2008
World record	Total	Liu Chunhong (CHN)	286 kg	Beijing, China	13 August 2008
Olympic record	Snatch	Liu Chunhong (CHN)	128 kg	Beijing, China	13 August 2008
Olympic record	Clean & Jerk	Liu Chunhong (CHN)	158 kg	Beijing, China	13 August 2008
Olympic record	Total	Liu Chunhong (CHN)	286 kg	Beijing, China	13 August 2008

== Results ==
Rank	Athlete	Nation	Group	Body weight	Snatch (kg)				Clean & Jerk (kg)				Total
Rank	Athlete	Nation	Group	Body weight	1	2	3	Result	1	2	3	Result	Total
1st place, gold medalist(s)	Xiang Yanmei	China	A	68.78	113	116	~~118~~	116	142	145	~~147~~	145	261
2nd place, silver medalist(s)	Zhazira Zhapparkul	Kazakhstan	A	69.00	111	115	~~117~~	115	~~140~~	140	144	144	259
3rd place, bronze medalist(s)	Sara Ahmed	Egypt	A	68.00	107	110	112	112	135	140	143	143	255
4	Leydi Solís	Colombia	A	68.61	106	~~110~~	110	110	140	143	~~146~~	143	253
5	Nazik Avdalyan	Armenia	A	68.55	103	~~107~~	107	107	130	133	135	135	242
6	Darya Pachabut	Belarus	A	66.88	~~105~~	105	~~108~~	105	126	132	~~137~~	132	237
7	Neisi Dájomes	Ecuador	B	68.83	100	104	107	107	130	~~135~~	~~135~~	130	237
8	Mönkhjantsangiin Ankhtsetseg	Mongolia	A	68.97	~~106~~	106	~~108~~	106	131	~~135~~	~~135~~	131	237
9	Marie-Ève Beauchemin-Nadeau	Canada	A	68.81	~~98~~	98	~~103~~	98	130	~~135~~	~~136~~	130	228
10	Rebekah Tiler	Great Britain	B	68.59	98	~~101~~	101	101	122	~~126~~	126	126	227
11	Apolonia Vaivai	Fiji	B	68.88	~~88~~	88	~~92~~	88	108	113	~~117~~	113	201
12	Duygu Aynacı	Turkey	B	68.83	85	88	90	90	105	~~110~~	110	110	200
13	Gulnabat Kadyrova	Turkmenistan	B	68.73	85	90	~~94~~	90	~~100~~	~~105~~	105	105	195
14	Arcangeline Fouodji	Cameroon	B	68.08	77	82	~~86~~	82	100	105	~~110~~	105	187
–	Patrycja Piechowiak	Poland	B	68.32	98	101	~~103~~	101	–	–	–	–	–
–	Florina Sorina Hulpan	Romania	A	67.52	~~100~~	~~100~~	100	100	–	–	–	–	–
–	Anastasiya Mikhalenka	Belarus	A	67.23	~~103~~	~~103~~	~~103~~	–	–	–	–	–	–
