= Weightlifting at the 2010 South American Games – Women's 63kg =

The Women's 63 kg event at the 2010 South American Games was held over March 27 at 18:00.

== Medalists ==
| Gold | Silver | Bronze |
|---|---|---|
| Nisida Palomeque; Colombia | Mercedes Pérez; Colombia | Iriner Jiménez; Venezuela |

== Results ==
| Rank | Athlete | Bodyweight | Snatch | | | Clean & Jerk | | | Total |
| Rank | Athlete | Bodyweight | 1 | 2 | 3 | 1 | 2 | 3 | Total |
|---|---|---|---|---|---|---|---|---|---|
| 1st place, gold medalist(s) | Nisida Palomeque (COL) | 61.57 | 91 | 101 | 102 | 123 | 126 | 129 | 231 |
| 2nd place, silver medalist(s) | Mercedes Pérez (COL) | 62.96 | ~~95~~ | 95 | 101 | 123 | 126 | ~~129~~ | 227 |
| 3rd place, bronze medalist(s) | Iriner Jiménez (VEN) | 62.70 | 89 | 91 | 93 | 115 | 122 | ~~124~~ | 215 |
| 4 | Sofia Valeria Izquierdo (ECU) | 61.24 | 80 | 83 | ~~87~~ | 103 | 107 | ~~111~~ | 190 |
| 5 | Liliane Lacerda (BRA) | 62.44 | 83 | 85 | ~~89~~ | ~~104~~ | ~~104~~ | 104 | 189 |

== New Records ==
| Snatch | 97 kg | Nisida Palomeque (COL) | GR |
| Snatch | 101 kg | Nisida Palomeque (COL) | GR |
| Snatch | 102 kg | Nisida Palomeque (COL) | GR |
| Clean & Jerk | 122 kg | Iriner Jiménez (VEN) | GR |
| Clean & Jerk | 123 kg | Mercedes Pérez (COL) | GR |
| Clean & Jerk | 126 kg | Mercedes Pérez (COL) | GR |
| Clean & Jerk | 129 kg | Nisida Palomeque (COL) | GR |
| Total | 227 kg | Mercedes Pérez (COL) | GR |
| Total | 231 kg | Nisida Palomeque (COL) | GR |
