= Zhazira Zhapparkul =

Kazakhstani weightlifter

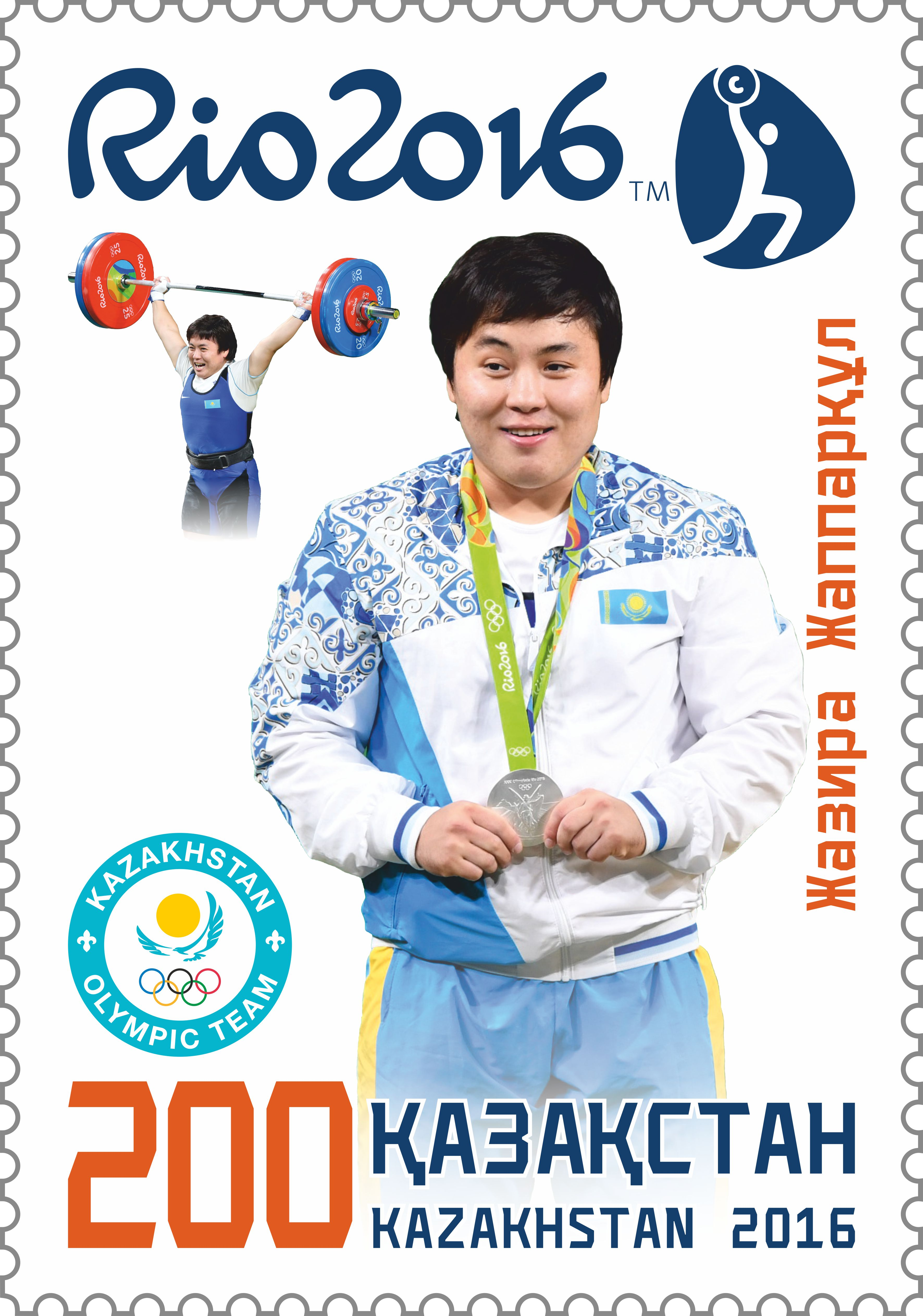
- Zhapparkul on a 2016 stamp of Kazakhstan

Personal information
- Native name: Жазира Әбдірахманқызы Жаппарқұл
- Full name: Zhazira Abdrakhmanovna Zhapparkul
- Nationality: Kazakh
- Born: 22 December 1993 (age 32) Arys, Kazakhstan
- Height: 1.55 m (5 ft 1 in) (2016)
- Weight: 69 kg (152 lb) (2016)

Sport
- Country: Kazakhstan
- Sport: Olympic Weightlifting
- Event: 69 kg
- Coached by: Alexey Ni (national); Vyacheslav Nyu

Achievements and titles
- Personal bests: Snatch: 118 kg (2014); Clean and jerk: 144 kg (2014); Total: 262 kg (2014)
Medal record
Women's weightlifting
Representing Kazakhstan
Event	1st	2nd	3rd
Olympic Games	0	1	0
World Championships	0	2	0
Junior World Championships	1	1	0
Youth Olympic Games	1	0	0
Total	2	4	0
Olympic Games
Silver medal – second place	2016 Rio de Janeiro	–69 kg
World Championships
Silver medal – second place	2014 Almaty	–69 kg
Silver medal – second place	2015 Houston	–69 kg
Junior World Championships
Gold medal – first place	2012 Guatemala	–69 kg
Silver medal – second place	2013 Lima	–69 kg
Youth Olympic Games
Gold medal – first place	2010 Singapore	–63 kg
- Updated on 10 August 2016

Zhazira Abdrakhmanovna Zhapparkul (Kazakh: Жазира Әбдірахманқызы Жаппарқұл, romanized: Jazira Äbdırahmanqyzy Japparqūl, born 22 December 1993 in Arys) is a Kazakh Olympian weightlifter who competes in the women's 69 kg weight category. She took silver medals at the 2014 and 2015 World Championships. She represented Kazakhstan at the 2016 Summer Olympics, she placed second, winning the silver medal.

== Personal life ==
Zhazira is the seventh child in her family. Since 2001, she started to practice weightlifting. She is now living and training in Shymkent.

== Career ==
Zhazira won the gold medal in the Women's 63 kg weight class at the 2010 Youth Olympic Games in Singapore.

Zhazira achieved 118 kg in snatch and 144 kg in clean and jerk, winning a silver medal with a total of 262 kg, competing in the -69 kg class at the 2014 World Weightlifting Championships in front of her home crowd.

In 2015, Zhapparkul moved to the 69 kg category. She won silver medal at the 2015 World Championships in Houston.

Zhapparkul competed at the Rio 2016 Summer Olympics, where she captured a silver medal in the 69 kg event.

== Major results ==
Year	Venue	Weight	Snatch (kg)				Clean & Jerk (kg)				Total	Rank
Year	Venue	Weight	1	2	3	Rank	1	2	3	Rank	Total	Rank
Olympic Games
2016	Rio de Janeiro, Brazil	69 kg	111	115	~~117~~	2	~~140~~	140	144	2	259	2nd place, silver medalist(s)
World Championships
2011	Paris, France	69 kg	100	~~107~~	~~107~~	15	121	126	128	9	228	13
2013	Wrocław, Poland	69 kg	98	103	~~105~~	10	123	~~128~~	128	8	231	9
2014	Almaty, Kazakhstan	69 kg	113	~~118~~	118	3rd place, bronze medalist(s)	140	~~144~~	144	2nd place, silver medalist(s)	262	2nd place, silver medalist(s)
2015	Houston, United States	69 kg	112	116	~~120~~	3rd place, bronze medalist(s)	~~140~~	140	~~147~~	2nd place, silver medalist(s)	256	2nd place, silver medalist(s)
Asian Games
2014	Incheon, South Korea	75 kg	112	118	~~121~~	3	140	~~145~~	145	4	263	4
Junior World Championships
2011	Penang, Malaysia	69 kg	100	105	109	2nd place, silver medalist(s)	~~130~~	~~130~~	~~130~~	-	-	-
2012	Guatemala, Guatemala	69 kg	102	106	~~108~~	1st place, gold medalist(s)	125	130	133	1st place, gold medalist(s)	239	1st place, gold medalist(s)
2013	Lima, Peru	69 kg	100	105	~~110~~	2nd place, silver medalist(s)	127	135	~~140~~	1st place, gold medalist(s)	240	2nd place, silver medalist(s)
Asian Junior Championships
2012	Yangoon, Myanmar	69 kg	100	~~106~~	~~106~~	4	121	126	132	2nd place, silver medalist(s)	232	2nd place, silver medalist(s)
Youth Olympic Games
2010	Singapore, Singapore	63 kg	~~87~~	87	90	2	107	115	-	1	205	1st place, gold medalist(s)

== See also ==
- Muslim women in sport
