= Weightlifting at the 2014 Asian Games =

- Venue: Moonlight Festival Garden Venue
- Dates: 20–26 September 2014
- Competitors: 200 from 32 nations

Weightlifting at the 2014 Asian Games was held in Incheon, South Korea from September 20 to 26, 2014. There were seven weight categories for the women and eight for the men. All competition took place at the Moonlight Festival Garden Weightlifting Venue.

== Schedule ==
B	Group B	A	Group A

Event↓/Date →	20th Sat		21st Sun		22nd Mon		23rd Tue		24th Wed		25th Thu		26th Fri	
Men's 56 kg	B	A												
Men's 62 kg			B	A										
Men's 69 kg					B	A								
Men's 77 kg							B	A						
Men's 85 kg									B	A				
Men's 94 kg											B	A		
Men's 105 kg											B		A	
Men's +105 kg													B	A
Women's 48 kg	A													
Women's 53 kg			B	A										
Women's 58 kg					A									
Women's 63 kg							A							
Women's 69 kg									A					
Women's 75 kg											A			
Women's +75 kg													A	

== Medalists ==
=== Men ===
Event	Gold	Silver	Bronze
56 kg	Om Yun-chol; North Korea	Thạch Kim Tuấn; Vietnam	Wu Jingbiao; China
62 kg	Kim Un-guk; North Korea	Chen Lijun; China	Eko Yuli Irawan; Indonesia
69 kg	Lin Qingfeng; China	Kim Myong-hyok; North Korea	Karrar Mohammed; Iraq
77 kg	Lü Xiaojun; China	Kim Kwang-song; North Korea	Chatuphum Chinnawong; Thailand
85 kg	Tian Tao; China	Kianoush Rostami; Iran	Ulugbek Alimov; Uzbekistan
94 kg	Liu Hao; China	Almas Uteshov; Kazakhstan	Lee Chang-ho; South Korea
105 kg	Yang Zhe; China	Kim Min-jae; South Korea	Sardorbek Dusmurotov; Uzbekistan
+105 kg	Behdad Salimi; Iran	Ai Yunan; China	Chen Shih-chieh; Chinese Taipei

=== Women ===
Event	Gold	Silver	Bronze
48 kg	Margarita Yelisseyeva; Kazakhstan	Sri Wahyuni Agustiani; Indonesia	Mahliyo Togoeva; Uzbekistan
53 kg	Hsu Shu-ching; Chinese Taipei	Zulfiya Chinshanlo; Kazakhstan	Zhang Wanqiong; China
58 kg	Ri Jong-hwa; North Korea	Wang Shuai; China	Rattikan Gulnoi; Thailand
63 kg	Lin Tzu-chi; Chinese Taipei	Deng Wei; China	Jo Pok-hyang; North Korea
69 kg	Xiang Yanmei; China	Ryo Un-hui; North Korea	Huang Shih-hsu; Chinese Taipei
75 kg	Kim Un-ju; North Korea	Kang Yue; China	Rim Jong-sim; North Korea
+75 kg	Zhou Lulu; China	Mariya Grabovetskaya; Kazakhstan	Chitchanok Pulsabsakul; Thailand

== Medal table ==
Rank	Nation	Gold	Silver	Bronze	Total
1	China (CHN)	7	5	2	14
2	North Korea (PRK)	4	3	2	9
3	Chinese Taipei (TPE)	2	0	2	4
4	Kazakhstan (KAZ)	1	3	0	4
5	Iran (IRI)	1	1	0	2
6	Indonesia (INA)	0	1	1	2
6	South Korea (KOR)	0	1	1	2
8	Vietnam (VIE)	0	1	0	1
9	Thailand (THA)	0	0	3	3
9	Uzbekistan (UZB)	0	0	3	3
11	Iraq (IRQ)	0	0	1	1
Totals (11 entries)		15	15	15	45

== Participating nations ==
A total of 200 athletes from 32 nations competed in weightlifting at the 2014 Asian Games:

- Afghanistan (3)
- Bangladesh (1)
- China (15)
- Chinese Taipei (11)
- India (6)
- Indonesia (10)
- Iran (7)
- Iraq (5)
- Japan (15)
- Jordan (2)
- Kazakhstan (15)
- Kuwait (4)
- Kyrgyzstan (3)
- Malaysia (1)
- Mongolia (8)
- Myanmar (2)
- Nepal (4)
- North Korea (12)
- Pakistan (4)
- Palestine (2)
- Philippines (1)
- Qatar (3)
- Saudi Arabia (8)
- South Korea (15)
- Sri Lanka (1)
- Syria (5)
- Tajikistan (2)
- Thailand (13)
- Turkmenistan (8)
- Uzbekistan (8)
- Vietnam (4)
- Yemen (2)
