= Kim Su-hyeon (weightlifter) =

South Korean weightlifter (born 1995)

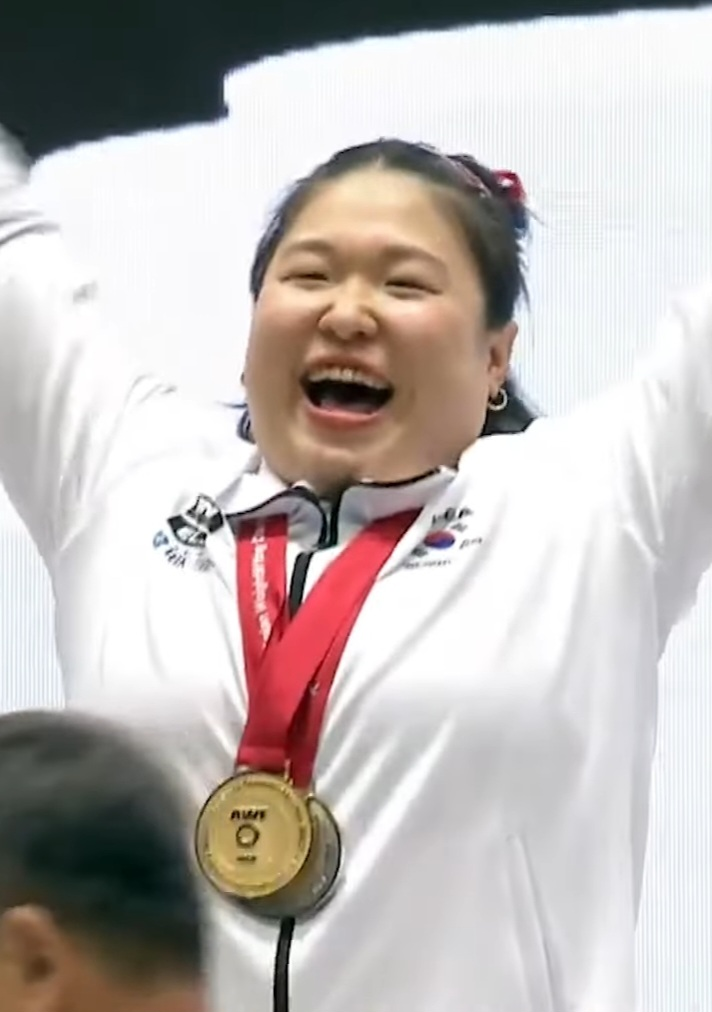
- Kim at the Jinju 2023 Asian Championships

Personal information
- Born: 6 February 1995 (age 31) Suwon, South Korea

Sport
- Country: South Korea
- Sport: Weightlifting
- Weight class: 76 kg
Medal record
Women's weightlifting
Representing South Korea
World Championships
Bronze medal – third place	2022 Bogotá	76 kg
Asian Games
Bronze medal – third place	2022 Hangzhou	76 kg
Asian Championships
Gold medal – first place	2023 Jinju	76 kg
Gold medal – first place	2024 Tashkent	81 kg
Silver medal – second place	2017 Ashgabat	69 kg
Silver medal – second place	2020 Tashkent	76 kg
Bronze medal – third place	2019 Ningbo	76 kg
Bronze medal – third place	2025 Jiangshan	76 kg

Kim Su-hyeon (Korean: 김수현, born 6 February 1995) is a South Korean weightlifter. She won the bronze medal in the women's 76 kg event at the 2022 World Weightlifting Championships held in Bogotá, Colombia. She also won the bronze medal in her event at the 2022 Asian Games held in Hangzhou, China.

== Career ==
Kim competed in the women's 69 kg event at the 2014 Asian Games held in Incheon, South Korea without winning a medal. She finished in 4th place. In 2018, she represented South Korea at the Asian Games held in Jakarta, Indonesia in the women's 69 kg event.

She won the bronze medal in the women's 76 kg event at the 2019 Asian Weightlifting Championships held in Ningbo, China.

Kim represented South Korea at the 2020 Summer Olympics in Tokyo, Japan. She competed in the women's 76 kg event. In 2023, she won the silver medal in the women's 76 kg snatch event at the World Weightlifting Championships held in Riyadh, Saudi Arabia.

In 2024, she competed in the women's 81 kg event at the Summer Olympics held in Paris, France. She lifted 250 kg in total and finished sixth among 13 participants.

== Major results ==
Year	Venue	Weight	Snatch (kg)				Clean & jerk (kg)				Total	Rank
Year	Venue	Weight	1	2	3	Rank	1	2	3	Rank	Total	Rank
Summer Olympics
2020	Tokyo, Japan	76 kg	106	~~109~~	~~110~~	—N/a	~~138~~	~~140~~	~~140~~	—N/a	DNF	—
2024	Paris, France	81 kg	~~110~~	110	~~113~~	—N/a	140	~~147~~	~~147~~	—N/a	250	6
World Championships
2014	Almaty, Kazakhstan	69 kg	97	~~101~~	101	12	~~125~~	~~125~~	125	9	226	11
2017	Anaheim, United States	69 kg	100	103	~~105~~	4	~~130~~	~~132~~	~~132~~	—	—	—
2018	Ashgabat, Turkmenistan	71 kg	90	93	~~96~~	11	~~115~~	116	~~123~~	13	209	12
2019	Pattaya, Thailand	81 kg	106	~~110~~	111	2nd place, silver medalist(s)	~~137~~	~~137~~	~~138~~	—	—	—
2021	Tashkent, Uzbekistan	76 kg	~~105~~	105	~~110~~	5	134	~~139~~	~~140~~	3rd place, bronze medalist(s)	239	5
2022	Bogotá, Colombia	76 kg	104	~~108~~	108	4	133	~~136~~	137	3rd place, bronze medalist(s)	245	3rd place, bronze medalist(s)
2023	Riyadh, Saudi Arabia	76 kg	104	106	~~109~~	2nd place, silver medalist(s)	~~133~~	133	~~137~~	4	239	4
2024	Manama, Bahrain	81 kg	~~107~~	~~107~~	~~107~~	—	135	~~140~~	~~140~~	6	—	—
IWF World Cup
2024	Phuket, Thailand	81 kg	108	~~112~~	112	8	~~140~~	~~144~~	144	5	256	5
Asian Games
2014	Incheon, South Korea	69 kg	94	~~100~~	~~100~~	—N/a	122	127	131	—N/a	225	4
2018	Jakarta, Indonesia	69 kg	97	~~101~~	~~101~~	—N/a	~~125~~	~~130~~	130	—N/a	227	4
2023	Hangzhou, China	76 kg	105	~~109~~	~~109~~	—N/a	132	136	138	—N/a	243	3rd place, bronze medalist(s)
Asian Championships
2015	Phuket, Thailand	69 kg	96	~~99~~	~~100~~	5	~~121~~	121	~~126~~	5	217	5
2017	Ashgabat, Turkmenistan	69 kg	95	100	~~103~~	3rd place, bronze medalist(s)	126	130	~~134~~	1st place, gold medalist(s)	230	2nd place, silver medalist(s)
2019	Ningbo, China	76 kg	101	104	107	3rd place, bronze medalist(s)	127	134	137	3rd place, bronze medalist(s)	244	3rd place, bronze medalist(s)
2021	Tashkent, Uzbekistan	76 kg	102	106	~~111~~	2nd place, silver medalist(s)	132	~~136~~	138	2nd place, silver medalist(s)	244	2nd place, silver medalist(s)
2023	Jinju, South Korea	76 kg	100	105	109	2nd place, silver medalist(s)	129	~~134~~	134	1st place, gold medalist(s)	243	1st place, gold medalist(s)
2024	Tashkent, Uzbekistan	81 kg	105	108	110	1st place, gold medalist(s)	132	140	144	1st place, gold medalist(s)	254	1st place, gold medalist(s)
2025	Jiangshan, China	76 kg	100	~~105~~	~~106~~	3rd place, bronze medalist(s)	130	~~134~~	134	2nd place, silver medalist(s)	234	3rd place, bronze medalist(s)
