= Lee Min-ji =

Lee Min-ji may refer to:

- Lee Min-ji (actress, born 1984)
- Lee Min-ji (actress, born 1988)
- Lee Min-ji (Miss Korea) (born 1991)
- Minjee Lee (born 1996), Australian professional golfer
- Lee Min-ji (weightlifter) (born 1999), South Korean weightlifter
