= Weightlifting at the 2008 Summer Olympics – Women's 69 kg =

Women's 69 kg at the Games of the XXIX Olympiad
- Venue: Beihang University Gymnasium
- Date: 13 August 2008
- Competitors: 10 from 9 nations

Medalists
1st place, gold medalist(s)		Oxana Slivenko	Russia
2nd place, silver medalist(s)		Leydi Solís	Colombia
3rd place, bronze medalist(s)		Abeer Abdelrahman	Egypt

The women's 69 kilograms weightlifting event was the fifth women's event at the weightlifting competition, with competitors limited to a maximum of 69 kilograms of body mass. The whole competition took place on August 13, but was divided in two parts due to the number of competitors. Group B weightlifters competed at 12:30, and Group A, at 15:30. This event was the eighth Weightlifting event to conclude.

Each lifter performed in both the snatch and clean and jerk lifts, with the final score being the sum of the lifter's best result in each. The athlete received three attempts in each of the two lifts; the score for the lift was the heaviest weight successfully lifted.

== Schedule ==
All times are China Standard Time (UTC+08:00)

Date	Time	Event
13 August 2008	15:30	Group A

== Records ==
Prior to this competition, the existing world and Olympic records were as follows.

World Record	Snatch	Oxana Slivenko (RUS)	123 kg	Santo Domingo, Dominican	4 October 2006
World Record	Clean & Jerk	Zarema Kasaeva (RUS)	157 kg	Doha, Qatar	13 November 2005
World Record	Total	Oxana Slivenko (RUS)	276 kg	Chiang Mai, Thailand	24 September 2007
Olympic Record	Snatch	Liu Chunhong (CHN)	122 kg	Athens, Greece	19 August 2004
Olympic Record	Clean & Jerk	Liu Chunhong (CHN)	153 kg	Athens, Greece	19 August 2004
Olympic Record	Total	Liu Chunhong (CHN)	275 kg	Athens, Greece	19 August 2004

== Results ==
Rank	Athlete	Group	Body weight	Snatch (kg)				Clean & Jerk (kg)				Total
Rank	Athlete	Group	Body weight	1	2	3	Result	1	2	3	Result	Total
1st place, gold medalist(s)	Oxana Slivenko (RUS)	A	68.47	110	~~115~~	115	115	136	140	—	140	255
2nd place, silver medalist(s)	Leydi Solís (COL)	A	67.54	99	103	105	105	125	132	135	135	240
3rd place, bronze medalist(s)	Abeer Abdelrahman (EGY)	A	69.00	100	~~105~~	105	105	~~133~~	133	~~136~~	133	238
4	Tulia Medina (COL)	A	68.63	100	104	106	106	120	~~124~~	124	124	230
5	Hanna Batsiushka (BLR)	A	68.65	105	~~110~~	~~110~~	105	120	~~126~~	~~126~~	120	225
6	Rika Saito (JPN)	A	68.65	~~87~~	87	~~90~~	87	115	120	122	122	209
—	Iriner Jiménez (VEN)	A	65.33	87	90	~~93~~	90	~~120~~	~~120~~	~~120~~	—	—
—	Hong Yong-ok (PRK)	A	68.07	~~103~~	~~103~~	~~103~~	—	—	—	—	—	—
DQ	Liu Chunhong (CHN)	A	68.87	120	125	128	128	145	149	158	158	~~286~~
DQ	Nataliya Davydova (UKR)	A	68.63	110	113	115	115	130	133	135	135	~~250~~

- Liu Chunhong of China originally won the gold medal, but she was disqualified after a positive anti-doping retest of her 2008 sample.
- Nataliya Davydova of Ukraine originally finished third, but she was disqualified in November 2016 after she tested positive for dehydrochlormethyltestosterone.

== New records ==
Snatch	~~125 kg~~	~~Liu Chunhong (CHN)~~	~~WR~~
Snatch	~~128 kg~~	~~Liu Chunhong (CHN)~~	~~WR~~
Clean & Jerk	~~158 kg~~	~~Liu Chunhong (CHN)~~	~~WR~~
Total	~~277 kg~~	~~Liu Chunhong (CHN)~~	~~WR~~
Total	~~286 kg~~	~~Liu Chunhong (CHN)~~	~~WR~~
