= 2022 World Weightlifting Championships – Women's 76 kg =

Weightlifting competition

The women's 76 kilograms competition at the 2022 World Weightlifting Championships was held on 13 December 2022.

== Schedule ==
Date	Time	Event
13 December 2022	14:00	Group B
13 December 2022	16:30	Group A

== Medalists ==
Event	Gold		Silver		Bronze	
Snatch	Sara Ahmed (EGY)	113 kg	Mattie Rogers (USA)	109 kg	Bella Paredes (ECU)	108 kg
Clean & Jerk	Sara Ahmed (EGY)	148 kg	Mattie Rogers (USA)	138 kg	Kim Su-hyeon (KOR)	137 kg
Total	Sara Ahmed (EGY)	261 kg	Mattie Rogers (USA)	247 kg	Kim Su-hyeon (KOR)	245 kg

== Records ==
Prior to this competition, the existing world records were as follows.

World Record	Snatch	Rim Jong-sim (PRK)	124 kg	Pattaya, Thailand	24 September 2019
World Record	Clean & Jerk	Zhang Wangli (CHN)	156 kg	Fuzhou, China	26 February 2019
World Record	Total	Rim Jong-sim (PRK)	278 kg	Ningbo, China	26 April 2019

== Results ==
Rank	Athlete	Group	Snatch (kg)				Clean & Jerk (kg)				Total
Rank	Athlete	Group	1	2	3	Rank	1	2	3	Rank	Total
1st place, gold medalist(s)	Sara Ahmed (EGY)	A	109	113	~~116~~	1st place, gold medalist(s)	138	143	148	1st place, gold medalist(s)	261
2nd place, silver medalist(s)	Mattie Rogers (USA)	A	106	~~108~~	109	2nd place, silver medalist(s)	~~137~~	138	~~142~~	2nd place, silver medalist(s)	247
3rd place, bronze medalist(s)	Kim Su-hyeon (KOR)	A	104	~~108~~	108	4	133	~~136~~	137	3rd place, bronze medalist(s)	245
4	Hellen Escobar (COL)	A	103	107	~~109~~	5	133	135	~~138~~	4	242
5	Bella Paredes (ECU)	A	101	105	108	3rd place, bronze medalist(s)	130	~~134~~	~~135~~	6	238
6	Kelin Jiménez (ECU)	A	98	102	105	8	127	132	~~135~~	5	237
7	Mailyng Echeverría (COL)	A	102	106	~~108~~	6	130	~~134~~	~~135~~	7	236
8	Shania Bedward (CAN)	B	93	97	101	9	118	124	128	8	229
9	Tatev Hakobyan (ARM)	A	105	~~108~~	~~109~~	7	~~122~~	122	~~125~~	11	227
10	Aray Nurlybekova (KAZ)	B	90	95	100	10	117	123	~~126~~	9	223
11	Milena Khachatryan (ARM)	A	95	100	~~103~~	11	~~120~~	120	~~130~~	14	220
12	Celia Gold (ISR)	A	93	96	~~99~~	13	~~118~~	118	121	12	217
13	Olivia Shelton (AUS)	B	90	94	~~98~~	15	115	119	~~123~~	15	213
14	Gintarė Bražaitė (LTU)	B	87	91	~~94~~	17	110	116	122 NR	10	213
15	Lizbeth Nolasco (MEX)	A	98	~~102~~	~~102~~	12	~~115~~	~~115~~	115	16	213
16	Daniela Ivanova (LAT)	B	~~92~~	92	~~95~~	16	120	~~123~~	~~123~~	13	212
17	Parisa Noorali (IRI)	B	~~88~~	~~88~~	90	18	110	~~116~~	~~117~~	17	200
18	Tia Sarah Tovarlaža (CRO)	B	73	77	~~80~~	19	~~95~~	95	~~100~~	18	172
—	Otgonbayaryn Darkhijav (MGL)	B	95	~~99~~	~~102~~	14	~~112~~	~~112~~	~~112~~	—	—
—	Nikki Löwik (NED)	B	—	—	—	—	—	—	—	—	—
