= 2021 World Weightlifting Championships – Women's 76 kg =

Weightlifting Championship

The women's 76 kilograms competition at the 2021 World Weightlifting Championships was held on 14 December 2021.

== Schedule ==
Date	Time	Event
14 December 2021	11:30	Group B
14 December 2021	19:00	Group A

== Medalists ==
Event	Gold		Silver		Bronze	
Snatch	Iana Sotieva (RWF)	112 kg	Laura Amaro (BRA)	108 kg	Mattie Rogers (USA)	107 kg
Clean & Jerk	Lee Min-ji (KOR)	139 kg	Mattie Rogers (USA)	136 kg	Kim Su-hyeon (KOR)	134 kg
Total	Lee Min-ji (KOR)	244 kg	Mattie Rogers (USA)	243 kg	Iana Sotieva (RWF)	242 kg

== Records ==
Prior to this competition, the existing world records were as follows.

World Record	Snatch	Rim Jong-sim (PRK)	124 kg	Pattaya, Thailand	24 September 2019
World Record	Clean & Jerk	Zhang Wangli (CHN)	156 kg	Fuzhou, China	26 February 2019
World Record	Total	Rim Jong-sim (PRK)	278 kg	Ningbo, China	26 April 2019

== Results ==
Rank	Athlete	Group	Snatch (kg)				Clean & Jerk (kg)				Total
Rank	Athlete	Group	1	2	3	Rank	1	2	3	Rank	Total
1st place, gold medalist(s)	Lee Min-ji (KOR)	A	105	~~109~~	~~109~~	4	133	137	139	1st place, gold medalist(s)	244
2nd place, silver medalist(s)	Mattie Rogers (USA)	A	104	107	~~110~~	3rd place, bronze medalist(s)	~~132~~	132	136	2nd place, silver medalist(s)	243
3rd place, bronze medalist(s)	Iana Sotieva (RWF)	A	108	112	~~114~~	1st place, gold medalist(s)	130	~~135~~	~~135~~	5	242
4	Laura Amaro (BRA)	A	103	106	108	2nd place, silver medalist(s)	126	132	~~136~~	4	240
5	Kim Su-hyeon (KOR)	A	~~105~~	105	~~110~~	5	134	~~139~~	~~140~~	3rd place, bronze medalist(s)	239
6	Maya Laylor (CAN)	A	99	~~101~~	~~102~~	6	120	125	130	6	229
7	Punam Yadav (IND)	A	~~96~~	96	98	7	119	122	~~124~~	8	220
8	Dilara Uçan (TUR)	A	93	96	~~99~~	8	~~115~~	115	120	9	216
9	Arockiya Alish (IND)	A	91	~~94~~	~~94~~	11	118	123	~~130~~	7	214
10	Liadi Taiwo (NGR)	B	90	~~95~~	95	9	~~115~~	~~115~~	115	10	210
11	Isabel Harrison Lorenzi (AUS)	A	~~90~~	90	93	10	108	~~112~~	~~112~~	11	201
12	Nina Rondziková (SVK)	B	82	85	88	12	103	107	~~111~~	12	195
13	Chloe Whylie (JAM)	B	75	~~80~~	~~80~~	14	90	~~94~~	95	13	170
14	Divya Nethmi Sanjana (SRI)	B	68	71	73	15	85	~~90~~	~~90~~	14	158
15	Wilkinstar Nyiro (KEN)	B	65	~~70~~	71	16	83	~~88~~	~~88~~	15	154
—	Ida Rönn (SWE)	A	87	~~92~~	~~92~~	13	~~114~~	~~114~~	~~114~~	—	—
