= Weightlifting at the 2010 Summer Youth Olympics – Girls' 63 kg =

The girls' 63 kg weightlifting event was the fourth women's event at the weightlifting competition at the 2010 Summer Youth Olympics, with competitors limited to a maximum of 63 kilograms of body mass. The whole competition took place on August 17 at 18:00.

Each lifter performed in both the snatch and clean and jerk lifts, with the final score being the sum of the lifter's best result in each. The athlete received three attempts in each of the two lifts; the score for the lift was the heaviest weight successfully lifted.

== Medalists ==
Gold	Zhazira Zhapparkul; Kazakhstan	205 kg
Silver	Diana Akhmetova; Russia	204 kg
Bronze	Aremi Fuentes; Mexico	194 kg

== Results ==
Rank	Name	Group	Body Weight	Snatch (kg)				Clean & Jerk (kg)				Total (kg)
Rank	Name	Group	Body Weight	1	2	3	Res	1	2	3	Res	Total (kg)
1st place, gold medalist(s)	Zhazira Zhapparkul (KAZ)	A	62.51	~~87~~	87	90	90	107	115	—	115	205
2nd place, silver medalist(s)	Diana Akhmetova (RUS)	A	58.88	89	92	94	94	110	~~114~~	~~114~~	110	204
3rd place, bronze medalist(s)	Aremi Fuentes (MEX)	A	62.11	~~85~~	85	88	88	106	~~110~~	~~112~~	106	194
4	Neslihan Okumus (TUR)	A	62.31	85	87	~~89~~	87	106	~~109~~	~~109~~	106	193
5	Patricia Llena (PHI)	A	62.95	75	80	83	83	95	~~100~~	~~100~~	95	178
6	Michelle Kahi (AUS)	A	62.43	69	~~74~~	74	74	85	92	~~95~~	92	166
7	Jessica Beed (USA)	A	62.11	70	~~75~~	75	75	90	~~93~~	~~93~~	90	165
