= Mönkhjantsangiin Ankhtsetseg =

Mongolian weightlifter (born 1997)

Personal information
- Native name: Мөнхжанцангийн Анхцэцэг
- Nickname: Orchidea
- Nationality: Mongolia
- Born: 25 December 1997 (age 28) Ulaanbaatar, Mongolia
- Height: 163 cm (5 ft 4 in)

Sport
- Sport: Weightlifting
- Weight class: 81 kg
- Club: Aldar Sports Committee
Medal record
Women's weightlifting
Representing Mongolia
World Championships
Gold medal – first place	2021 Tashkent	87 kg
Asian Championships
Gold medal – first place	2016 Tashkent	–75 kg
Gold medal – first place	2022 Manama	–87 kg
Silver medal – second place	2019 Ningbo	–81 kg
Bronze medal – third place	2021 Tashkent	–87 kg
Bronze medal – third place	2023 Jinju	–81 kg

Mönkhjantsangiin Ankhtsetseg (Mongolian: Мөнхжанцангийн Анхцэцэг; born 25 December 1997) is a Mongolian weightlifter, competing in the 81 kg category and representing Mongolia at international competitions.

== Career ==
She competed at world championships, including at the 2015 World Weightlifting Championships. She won the gold medal in the women's 87 kg event at the 2021 World Weightlifting Championships held in Tashkent, Uzbekistan.

She competed in the women's 69 kg event at the 2016 Summer Olympics. She also competed in the women's 87 kg event at the 2020 Summer Olympics in Tokyo, Japan.

She won the gold medal in her event at the 2022 Asian Weightlifting Championships held in Manama, Bahrain. In 2024, she competed in the women's 81 kg event at the Summer Olympics held in Paris, France. She lifted 225 kg in total and finished 10th among 13 participants.

== Major results ==
Year	Venue	Weight	Snatch (kg)				Clean & Jerk (kg)				Total	Rank
Year	Venue	Weight	1	2	3	Rank	1	2	3	Rank	Total	Rank
Summer Olympics
2016	Rio de Janeiro, Brazil	69 kg	~~106~~	106	~~108~~	—N/a	131	~~135~~	~~135~~	—N/a	237	8
2020	Tokyo, Japan	87 kg	~~110~~	110	~~112~~	—N/a	~~140~~	142	~~147~~	—N/a	252	4
2024	Paris, France	81 kg	100	~~106~~	~~108~~	—N/a	120	125	—	—N/a	225	10
World Championships
2014	Almaty, Kazakhstan	69 kg	94	100	107	6	124	~~129~~	~~129~~	11	231	9
2015	Houston, United States	69 kg	110	~~116~~	~~116~~	5	133	~~137~~	~~139~~	9	243	7
2017	Anaheim, United States	75 kg	101	~~106~~	107	3rd place, bronze medalist(s)	—	—	—	—	—	—
2019	Pattaya, Thailand	81 kg	101	107	110	3rd place, bronze medalist(s)	123	127	~~131~~	9	237	8
2021	Tashkent, Uzbekistan	87 kg	~~109~~	109	~~113~~	2nd place, silver medalist(s)	~~137~~	137	141	2nd place, silver medalist(s)	250	1st place, gold medalist(s)
2022	Bogotá, Colombia	87 kg	~~110~~	~~111~~	~~111~~	—	138	143	~~148~~	2nd place, silver medalist(s)	—	—
2023	Riyadh, Saudi Arabia	81 kg	90	—	—	27	—	—	—	—	—	—
2024	Manama, Bahrain	81 kg	110	~~115~~	116	2nd place, silver medalist(s)	137	~~141~~	~~144~~	5	253	4
IWF World Cup
2024	Phuket, Thailand	81 kg	105	—	—	16	—	—	—	—	—	—
Asian Games
2023	Hangzhou, China	87 kg	103	107	~~109~~	—N/a	~~134~~	~~136~~	~~138~~	—N/a	—	—
Asian Championships
2012	Pyeongtaek, South Korea	69 kg	~~83~~	83	88	9	106	~~111~~	111	9	199	9
2016	Tashkent, Uzbekistan	75 kg	106	109	112	1st place, gold medalist(s)	128	132	—	1st place, gold medalist(s)	244	1st place, gold medalist(s)
2019	Ningbo, China	81 kg	90	93	~~94~~	3rd place, bronze medalist(s)	110	~~113~~	113	3rd place, bronze medalist(s)	206	2nd place, silver medalist(s)
2021	Tashkent, Uzbekistan	87 kg	108	~~111~~	111	3rd place, bronze medalist(s)	~~136~~	136	~~140~~	3rd place, bronze medalist(s)	247	3rd place, bronze medalist(s)
2022	Manama, Bahrain	87 kg	111	114	~~116~~	1st place, gold medalist(s)	~~135~~	135	~~145~~	1st place, gold medalist(s)	249	1st place, gold medalist(s)
2023	Jinju, South Korea	81 kg	106	~~108~~	108	3rd place, bronze medalist(s)	135	—	—	3rd place, bronze medalist(s)	243	3rd place, bronze medalist(s)
2024	Tashkent, Uzbekistan	81 kg	103	~~106~~	~~108~~	7	128	—	—	—	—	—
