= Anastasia Romanova (weightlifter) =

Russian weightlifter (born 1991)

Anastasiia Romanova
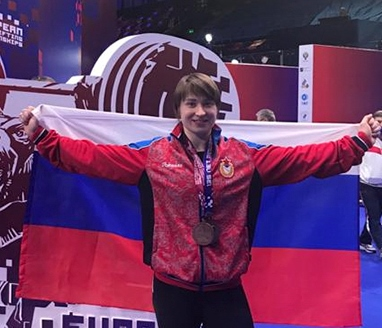

Personal information
- Full name: Anastasiia Olegovna Romanova
- Born: 2 October 1991 (age 35)
- Weight: 68.60 kg (151.2 lb)

Sport
- Country: Russia
- Sport: Weightlifting
- Event: Women's 69 kg
- Team: National team
Medal record
World Championships
Bronze medal – third place	2015 Houston	–69 kg
European Championships
Bronze medal – third place	2021 Moscow	–76 kg
Gold medal – first place	2019 Batumi	–71 kg
Gold medal – first place	2017 Split	–69 kg
- Updated on 30 August 2016

Anastasiia Olegovna Romanova (Russian: Анастасия Оле́говна Романова; born 2 October 1991) is a Russian weightlifter, competing in the 69 kg category. In competition Romanova was tested positive for Stanozolol and banned for 2 years by the IWF, ending in April 2015. She competed at world championships, including at the 2015 World Weightlifting Championships. She won the 2017 European Weightlifting Championships in the 69 kg class.

== Major results ==
Year	Venue	Weight	Snatch (kg)				Clean & Jerk (kg)				Total	Rank
Year	Venue	Weight	1	2	3	Rank	1	2	3	Rank	Total	Rank
World Championships
2015	Houston, United States	69 kg	112	116	~~118~~	3rd place, bronze medalist(s)	135	137	~~139~~	3rd place, bronze medalist(s)	253	3rd place, bronze medalist(s)
2018	Ashgabat, Turkmenistan	71 kg	105	110	~~113~~	4	125	130	~~133~~	6	240	4
