= Mattie Rogers =

American weightlifter (born 1995)

Personal information
- Full name: Martha Ann Rogers
- Nationality: American
- Born: August 23, 1995 (age 31) Apopka, Florida, United States
- Education: University of Central Florida
- Height: 5 ft 7 in (170 cm)
- Weight: 78.60 kg (173 lb)

Sport
- Country: United States
- Sport: Weightlifting
- Event: –81 kg
- Club: Catalyst Athletics
- Coached by: Aimee Anaya Everett

Achievements and titles
- Personal bests: Snatch: 112 kg (247 lb); Clean & Jerk: 143 kg (315 lb); Total: 255 kg (562 lb)
Medal record
Representing the United States
World Championships
Silver medal – second place	2017 Anaheim	–69 kg
Silver medal – second place	2019 Pattaya	–71 kg
Silver medal – second place	2021 Tashkent	–76 kg
Silver medal – second place	2022 Bogotá	–76 kg
Pan American Championships
Gold medal – first place	2020 Santo Domingo	-81 kg
Gold medal – first place	2022 Bogotá	-76 kg
Gold medal – first place	2025 Cali	-77 kg
Gold medal – first place	2026 Panama City	77 kg
Silver medal – second place	2016 Cartagena	-69 kg
Silver medal – second place	2017 Miami	-69 kg
Silver medal – second place	2018 Santo Domingo	-69 kg
Silver medal – second place	2019 Guatemala City	-71 kg
Silver medal – second place	2021 Guayaquil	-76 kg

Martha Ann "Mattie" Rogers (born August 23, 1995) is an American Olympic weightlifter. She is a four-time silver medalist at the World Weightlifting Championships. She holds the United States record in the snatch, clean & jerk, and total in the 76 kg category. She competed for the United States at the 2020 Summer Olympics in the 87 kg category.

== Early life ==
Rogers was born August 23, 1995, in Apopka, Florida. Rogers started in gymnastics when she was two, and continued to be involved in the sport for 10-12 years. She later also competed in cheerleading. When she was 17, she began training in CrossFit where she learned weightlifting. After one year of training, she competed in her first weightlifting meet.

== Weightlifting career ==
In 2014, Rogers made her International Weightlifting Federation debut at the 2014 IWF Pan-American Junior Championships. She made her senior-level debut a year later at the 2015 World Championships where she finished 15th overall with a total of 226 kg. She competed the next year at the 2015 World Weightlifting Championships.

In 2016, Rogers narrowly missed qualifying for the 2016 Summer Olympics. She was awarded best overall lifter at the 2016 National Championships & Olympic Trials, but ultimately did not meet the qualification criteria set by the IWF.

In 2021, she won the silver medal in the women's 76 kg event at the World Weightlifting Championships held in Tashkent, Uzbekistan.

She won the gold medal in the women's 76 kg event at the 2022 Pan American Weightlifting Championships held in Bogotá, Colombia. She also won the gold medals in the Snatch and Clean & Jerk events in this competition. Later in the year, at the 2022 World Weightlifting Championships also held in Bogotá, she again won silvers in the women's 76 kg as well the Snatch and Clean & Jerk, making her the only American weightlifter to win medals at five consecutive World Championships.

== Major results ==
=== International events ===
Year	Venue	Weight	Snatch (kg)				Clean & Jerk (kg)				Total	Rank
Year	Venue	Weight	1	2	3	Rank	1	2	3	Rank	Total	Rank
Olympic Games
2020 (held in 2021)	Tokyo, Japan	87 kg	108	~~111~~	~~112~~	6	~~138~~	~~138~~	138	6	246	6
World Championships
2015	Houston, United States	69 kg	97	100	~~102~~	16	120	123	126	13	226	14
2017	Anaheim, United States	69 kg	101	104	~~107~~	2nd place, silver medalist(s)	131	~~135~~	~~135~~	3rd place, bronze medalist(s)	235	2nd place, silver medalist(s)
2018	Ashgabat, Turkmenistan	71 kg	100	103	105	5	130	133	~~137~~	3rd place, bronze medalist(s)	238	5
2019	Pattaya, Thailand	71 kg	103	106	~~108~~	3rd place, bronze medalist(s)	130	134	~~137~~	2nd place, silver medalist(s)	240	2nd place, silver medalist(s)
2021	Tashkent, Uzbekistan	76 kg	104	107	~~110~~	3rd place, bronze medalist(s)	~~132~~	132	136	2nd place, silver medalist(s)	243	2nd place, silver medalist(s)
2022	Bogotá, Colombia	76 kg	106	~~108~~	109	2nd place, silver medalist(s)	~~137~~	138	~~142~~	2nd place, silver medalist(s)	247	2nd place, silver medalist(s)
2023	Riyadh, Saudi Arabia	81 kg	110	112	~~115~~	4	140	~~143~~	~~143~~	4	252	4
2024	Manama, Bahrain	76 kg	~~105~~	~~105~~	~~105~~	—	130	~~136~~	~~138~~	5	—	—
2025	Førde, Norway	77 kg	107	~~111~~	~~111~~	7	135	~~140~~	140	3rd place, bronze medalist(s)	247	4
2026	Ningbo, China	77 kg	~~108~~	108	111	8	137	140	~~143~~	4	251	7
Pan American Championships
2016	Cartagena, Colombia	69 kg	102	104	106	2nd place, silver medalist(s)	129	133	~~137~~	3rd place, bronze medalist(s)	239	2nd place, silver medalist(s)
2017	Miami, United States	69 kg	~~95~~	96	100	2nd place, silver medalist(s)	125	130	133	2nd place, silver medalist(s)	233	2nd place, silver medalist(s)
2018	Santo Domingo, Dominican Republic	69 kg	~~99~~	99	~~103~~	2nd place, silver medalist(s)	126	130	~~136~~	2nd place, silver medalist(s)	229	2nd place, silver medalist(s)
2019	Guatemala City, Guatemala	71 kg	103	106	~~108~~	2nd place, silver medalist(s)	132	~~136~~	~~140~~	2nd place, silver medalist(s)	238	2nd place, silver medalist(s)
2020 (held in 2021)	Santo Domingo, Dominican Republic	81 kg	105	108	111	1st place, gold medalist(s)	~~135~~	135	140	2nd place, silver medalist(s)	251	1st place, gold medalist(s)
2021	Guayaquil, Ecuador	76 kg	~~102~~	~~103~~	103	4	129	~~134~~	134	1st place, gold medalist(s)	237	2nd place, silver medalist(s)
2022	Bogotá, Colombia	76 kg	108	111	~~114~~	1st place, gold medalist(s)	136	~~141~~	141	1st place, gold medalist(s)	252	1st place, gold medalist(s)
2023	Bariloche, Argentina	81 kg	107	110	~~112~~	5	137	~~142~~	~~144~~	4	247	4
2025	Cali, Colombia	77 kg	106	~~109~~	110	3rd place, bronze medalist(s)	134	~~137~~	139	1st place, gold medalist(s)	249	1st place, gold medalist(s)
IWF Grand Prix I
2023	Havana, Cuba	81kg	~~110~~	110	-	5	138	~~142~~	~~143~~	5	248	
World University Championships
2016	Mérida, Mexico	69 kg	95	99	103	1st place, gold medalist(s)	122	126	132	1st place, gold medalist(s)	235	1st place, gold medalist(s)
Junior World Championships
2014	Kazan, Russia	63 kg	88	~~91~~	~~91~~	7	98	102	~~104~~	10	190	9
2015	Wrocław, Poland	63 kg	~~91~~	~~91~~	91	5	110	~~114~~	~~114~~	8	201	7
Pan American Junior Championships
2014	Reno, United States	63 kg	83	86	89	3rd place, bronze medalist(s)	~~99~~	99	~~102~~	4	188	3rd place, bronze medalist(s)
2015	Cartagena, Colombia	63 kg	90	~~92~~	92	1st place, gold medalist(s)	~~110~~	110	~~115~~	3rd place, bronze medalist(s)	202	3rd place, bronze medalist(s)

=== National events ===
Year	Venue	Weight	Snatch (kg)				Clean & Jerk (kg)				Total	Rank
Year	Venue	Weight	1	2	3	Rank	1	2	3	Rank	Total	Rank
USA Weightlifting National Championships
2015	Dallas, United States	69 kg	95	98	~~100~~	1st place, gold medalist(s)	117	120	~~122~~	1st place, gold medalist(s)	218	1st place, gold medalist(s)
2016	Salt Lake City, United States	69 kg	100	106	~~109~~	1st place, gold medalist(s)	~~132~~	132	~~141~~	1st place, gold medalist(s)	238	1st place, gold medalist(s)
2017	Chicago, United States	69 kg	98	102	105	1st place, gold medalist(s)	126	130	134	1st place, gold medalist(s)	239	1st place, gold medalist(s)
2021	Detroit, United States	81 kg	106	109	112	1st place, gold medalist(s)	135	140	143	1st place, gold medalist(s)	255	1st place, gold medalist(s)
2022	Las Vegas, United States	76 kg	110	112	-	1st place, gold medalist(s)	140	-	-	1st place, gold medalist(s)	252	1st place, gold medalist(s)
American Open Finals
2016	Orlando, United States	69 kg	97	100	103	1st place, gold medalist(s)	123	126	132	1st place, gold medalist(s)	235	1st place, gold medalist(s)
2019	Salt Lake City, United States	76 kg	~~105~~	~~105~~	~~105~~	-	135	~~138~~	~~140~~	1st place, gold medalist(s)	-	-
2020	New York City, United States	76 kg	104	107	~~110~~	1st place, gold medalist(s)	126	130	136	1st place, gold medalist(s)	243	1st place, gold medalist(s)
2021	Denver, United States	81 kg	104	~~107~~	107	1st place, gold medalist(s)	130	135	-	2nd place, silver medalist(s)	242	1st place, gold medalist(s)
University National Championships
2015	Ogden, United States	69 kg	96	99	102	1st place, gold medalist(s)	118	121	124	1st place, gold medalist(s)	226	1st place, gold medalist(s)
