= Lenka Kenisová =

Czech weightlifter

Lenka Kenisova
Personal information
- Born: 20 September 1983 (age 42)
- Weight: 67.82 kg (149.5 lb)

Sport
- Country: Czech Republic
- Sport: Weightlifting
- Team: National Team
- Updated on 31 August 2016

Lenka Kenisová-Orságová (born 20 September 1983) is a Czech female weightlifter, competing in the 69 kg category and representing Czech Republic at international competitions. She competed at world championships, including at the 2015 World Weightlifting Championships.

== Major results ==
Year	Venue	Weight	Snatch (kg)				Clean & Jerk (kg)				Total	Rank
Year	Venue	Weight	1	2	3	Rank	1	2	3	Rank	Total	Rank
World Championships
2015	Houston, United States	69 kg	~~85~~	85	~~87~~	39	106	~~108~~	~~109~~	35	191	37
2014	Almaty, Kazakhstan	69 kg	~~84~~	84	~~87~~	25	105	108	111	20	195	23
2010	Antalya, Turkey	63 kg	~~90~~	90	~~93~~	17	~~114~~	114	117	11	207	14
2009	Goyang, South Korea	63 kg	90	92	~~94~~	17	115	~~118~~	~~119~~	17	207	17
2006	Santo Domingo, Dominican Republic	63 kg	87	~~91~~	~~91~~	18	110	~~113~~	113	15	200.0	17
2005	Doha, Qatar	63 kg	88	~~92~~	92	6	110	~~112~~	~~113~~	11	202.0	8

== See also ==
- 2014 World Weightlifting Championships – Women's 69 kg
- 2015 World Weightlifting Championships – Women's 69 kg
