= 2023 World Weightlifting Championships – Women's 76 kg =

The women's 76 kilograms competition at the 2023 World Weightlifting Championships was held on 14 September 2023.

== Schedule ==
Date	Time	Event
14 September 2023	09:00	Group C
14 September 2023	14:00	Group B
14 September 2023	16:30	Group A

== Medalists ==
Event	Gold		Silver		Bronze	
Snatch	Sara Ahmed (EGY)	108 kg	Kim Su-hyeon (KOR)	106 kg	Hellen Escobar (COL)	106 kg
Clean & Jerk	Sara Ahmed (EGY)	138 kg	Hellen Escobar (COL)	136 kg	Bella Paredes (ECU)	135 kg
Total	Sara Ahmed (EGY)	246 kg	Hellen Escobar (COL)	242 kg	Bella Paredes (ECU)	240 kg

== Records ==
Prior to this competition, the existing world records were as follows.

World Record	Snatch	Rim Jong-sim (PRK)	124 kg	Pattaya, Thailand	24 September 2019
World Record	Clean & Jerk	Zhang Wangli (CHN)	156 kg	Fuzhou, China	26 February 2019
World Record	Total	Rim Jong-sim (PRK)	278 kg	Ningbo, China	26 April 2019

== Results ==
Rank	Athlete	Group	Snatch (kg)				Clean & Jerk (kg)				Total
Rank	Athlete	Group	1	2	3	Rank	1	2	3	Rank	Total
1st place, gold medalist(s)	Sara Ahmed (EGY)	A	108	-	-	1st place, gold medalist(s)	138	-	-	1st place, gold medalist(s)	246
2nd place, silver medalist(s)	Hellen Escobar (COL)	A	~~103~~	103	106	3rd place, bronze medalist(s)	132	136	~~140~~	2nd place, silver medalist(s)	242
3rd place, bronze medalist(s)	Bella Paredes (ECU)	A	~~105~~	105	~~107~~	4	131	135	~~137~~	3rd place, bronze medalist(s)	240
4	Kim Su-hyeon (KOR)	A	104	106	~~109~~	2nd place, silver medalist(s)	~~133~~	133	~~137~~	4	239
5	Dilara Narin (TUR)	A	100	103	~~105~~	5	130	~~134~~	~~135~~	5	233
6	Kelin Jiménez (ECU)	A	98	~~101~~	102	8	124	~~130~~	130	6	232
7	Shania Bedward (CAN)	A	95	99	~~102~~	9	~~119~~	119	~~126~~	8	218
8	Aray Nurlybekova (KAZ)	B	93	~~97~~	97	10	~~118~~	118	~~124~~	9	215
9	Laura Vest Tolstrup (DEN)	B	89	~~92~~	93	12	~~116~~	116	~~120~~	10	209
10	Gintarė Bražaitė (LTU)	B	91	~~95~~	95	11	~~111~~	113	~~117~~	11	208
11	Ryna Litoshyk (AIN)	B	87	89	91	14	106	109	111	12	202
12	Ivona Gavran (CRO)	B	86	89	91	13	105	110	~~113~~	13	201
13	Patricie Ježková (CZE)	B	86	~~89~~	~~90~~	17	104	108	110	14	196
14	Jutta Selin (FIN)	B	~~88~~	88	~~90~~	15	108	~~112~~	~~112~~	16	196
15	Nina Rondziková (SVK)	B	84	87	~~90~~	16	104	107	~~110~~	18	194
16	Susan Plakke (NED)	C	85	~~90~~	~~93~~	18	~~105~~	105	108	15	193
17	Ali Yusuf Yahya Zainab (BHR)	C	78	81	~~84~~	19	100	104	107	17	188
18	Abrar Al-Fahad (KUW)	C	75	79	~~82~~	22	102	~~105~~	105	19	184
19	Desponia Charitopoulou (GRE)	C	~~80~~	80	~~83~~	21	100	~~105~~	~~105~~	21	180
20	Polina Guryeva (TKM)	C	73	76	~~79~~	23	98	~~101~~	102	20	178
21	Maria Tavares (POR)	C	76	78	81	20	92	~~97~~	~~97~~	22	173
22	Layan Al-Qurashi (KSA)	C	~~55~~	55	~~61~~	24	65	70	73	23	128
—	Elaheh Razzaghi (IRI)	B	~~90~~	~~91~~	~~93~~	—	113	~~118~~	119	7	—
—	Erica Sinisterra (COL)	A	100	103	~~105~~	6	~~130~~	~~130~~	~~130~~	—	—
—	Meredith Alwine (USA)	A	~~103~~	~~103~~	103	7	~~135~~	—	—	—	—
—	Gülnabat Kadyrowa (TKM)	C	—	—	—	—	—	—	—	—	—
—	Marie Fegue (FRA)	C	—	—	—	—	—	—	—	—	—
—	Gunel Valiyeva (AZE)	A	Did not start								
—	Parisa Jahanfekrian (WRT)	B	Did not start								
—	Hadijja Nankanjja (UGA)	C	Did not start								
—	Rayssa Djifack (CMR)	C	Did not start								
