= 2024 World Weightlifting Championships – Women's 81 kg =

Women's 81 kg at the 2024 World Weightlifting Championships
- Venue: Weightlifting Marquee Venue
- Location: Manama, Bahrain
- Dates: 13 December
- Competitors: 16 from 15 nations
- Winning total: 278 kg

Medalists
gold medal	Liao Guifang	China
silver medal	Sara Ahmed	Egypt
bronze medal	Kim Kyong-ryong	North Korea

The women's 81 kilograms competition at the 2024 World Weightlifting Championships was held on 13 December 2024.

== Schedule ==
Date	Time	Event
13 December 2024	12:30	Group B
13 December 2024	17:30	Group A

== Records ==
Prior to this competition, the existing world records were as follows.

World Record	Snatch	World Standard	127 kg	—	1 November 2018
World Record	Clean & Jerk	Liang Xiaomei (CHN)	161 kg	Doha, Qatar	12 December 2023
World Record	Total	Liang Xiaomei (CHN)	284 kg	Doha, Qatar	12 December 2023

== Results ==
Rank	Athlete	Group	Snatch (kg)				Clean & Jerk (kg)				Total
Rank	Athlete	Group	1	2	3	Rank	1	2	3	Rank	Total
1st place, gold medalist(s)	Liao Guifang (CHN)	A	115	120	123	1st place, gold medalist(s)	146	150	155	1st place, gold medalist(s)	278
2nd place, silver medalist(s)	Sara Ahmed (EGY)	A	113	~~117~~	~~117~~	4	145	149	~~153~~	2nd place, silver medalist(s)	262
3rd place, bronze medalist(s)	Kim Kyong-ryong (PRK)	A	110	~~114~~	114	3rd place, bronze medalist(s)	~~143~~	143	147	3rd place, bronze medalist(s)	261
4	Mönkhjantsangiin Ankhtsetseg (MGL)	B	110	~~115~~	116	2nd place, silver medalist(s)	137	~~141~~	~~144~~	5	253
5	Yudelina Mejía (DOM)	A	~~108~~	108	~~112~~	6	140	144	~~146~~	4	252
6	Laura Amaro (BRA)	A	105	108	111	5	130	135	~~138~~	7	246
7	Yekta Jamali (WRT)	B	100	104	~~107~~	8	127	131	133	8	237
8	Yeinny Geles (COL)	A	103	~~106~~	~~106~~	9	~~130~~	~~130~~	130	11	233
9	Weronika Zielińska (POL)	B	~~102~~	102	~~107~~	10	127	~~130~~	130	10	232
10	Mariah Park (USA)	B	92	96	100	13	125	128	131	9	231
11	Emmy González (MEX)	B	101	~~106~~	~~106~~	11	124	~~128~~	129	12	230
12	Kim I-seul (KOR)	B	95	101	~~106~~	12	120	126	~~130~~	13	227
13	Gintarė Bražaitė (LTU)	B	~~96~~	96	~~101~~	14	115	120	126	14	222
—	Valeria Rivas (COL)	A	107	~~110~~	~~112~~	7	~~138~~	~~138~~	~~138~~	—	—
—	Kim Su-hyeon (KOR)	A	~~107~~	~~107~~	~~107~~	—	135	~~140~~	~~140~~	6	—
—	Simona Jeřábková (CZE)	B	~~86~~	~~86~~	~~86~~	—	102	106	~~110~~	15	—
