= Sara Ahmed (weightlifter) =

Egyptian weightlifter (born 1998)

Personal information
- Full name: Sara Samir Elsayed Mohamed Ahmed
- Born: 1 January 1998 (age 28) Al-Huaniya, Ismailia Governorate, Egypt
- Height: 155 cm (5 ft 1 in)
- Weight: 71.00 kg (157 lb)

Sport
- Country: Egypt
- Sport: Weightlifting
- Event: –71 kg
- Coached by: Khaled Korani
Medal record
Representing Egypt
Women's weightlifting
Olympic Games
Silver medal – second place	2024 Paris	81 kg
Bronze medal – third place	2016 Rio de Janeiro	69 kg
World Championships
Gold medal – first place	2022 Bogotá	76 kg
Gold medal – first place	2023 Riyadh	76 kg
Silver medal – second place	2018 Ashgabat	71 kg
Silver medal – second place	2024 Manama	81 kg
Silver medal – second place	2025 Førde	77 kg
Bronze medal – third place	2026 Ningbo	77 kg
African Championships
Gold medal – first place	2019 Cairo	76 kg
Gold medal – first place	2022 Cairo	81 kg
Gold medal – first place	2023 Tunis	81 kg
Gold medal – first place	2024 Ismailia	81 kg
Gold medal – first place	2026 Ismailia	86 kg
African Games
Gold medal – first place	2015 Brazzaville	69 kg
Gold medal – first place	2023 Accra	81 kg
Mediterranean Games
Gold medal – first place	2013 Mersin	63 kg CJ
Gold medal – first place	2018 Tarragona	69 kg S
Gold medal – first place	2018 Tarragona	69 kg CJ
Gold medal – first place	2026 Taranto	77 kg S
Gold medal – first place	2026 Taranto	77 kg CJ
Bronze medal – third place	2013 Mersin	63 kg S
Islamic Solidarity Games
Gold medal – first place	2025 Riyadh	77 kg T
Gold medal – first place	2025 Riyadh	77 kg C
Silver medal – second place	2025 Riyadh	77 kg S
World Junior Championships
Gold medal – first place	2015 Wrocław	69 kg
Gold medal – first place	2018 Tashkent	69 kg
Junior African Championships
Gold medal – first place	2012 Tunis	63 kg
Youth Olympics
Gold medal – first place	2014 Nanjing	63 kg
World Youth Championships
Gold medal – first place	2015 Lima	63 kg
Gold medal – first place	2013 Tashkent	63 kg
Youth African Championships
Gold medal – first place	2012 Tunis	63 kg

Sara Ahmed (Arabic: سارة سمير السيد محمد أحمد; born 1 January 1998) is an Egyptian weightlifter who won a bronze medal in the women's 69 kg event at the 2016 Summer Olympics in Rio de Janeiro, Brazil and the silver medal in the women's 81kg event at the 2024 Summer Olympics. She won the gold medal in the women's 76 kg event at the 2022 World Weightlifting Championships.

Originally from the Ismailia Governorate, Ahmed was encouraged to take part in weightlifting by her family and was competing internationally by 2012. At the senior level, she has earned gold medals at the Mediterranean and African Games, as well as the Arab Championships. In Rio de Janeiro, she became the first Arab woman to win an Olympic weightlifting medal and the first Egyptian woman to receive an Olympic medal on the podium in any discipline.

== Early life ==
Ahmed was born in the village of Al-Huaniya in Egypt's Ismailia Governorate. Her father (who died in 2015) and older brother were national competitors in weightlifting, which inspired her to take up the sport in 2010. Although her participation in the sport interfered with her studies somewhat, she received encouragement and support for her family and found success in local and regional tournaments, eventually earning a spot on the Egyptian national team.

== Career ==
Ahmed's international career began at the 2012 Junior African Championships in Tunis, where she won gold in the 63 kg division. She repeated that feat at the Youth edition, held in the same city, as well as the 2013 Youth World Championships in Tashkent. Her first senior-level competition was the 2013 Mediterranean Games, where she won the clean & jerk portion and was third in the snatch, leaving her second overall behind Turkey's Sibel Şimşek (Romela Begaj of Albania had the same total, but a higher body weight). She then bumped up to the 69 kg division and won that category at the 2014 African Youth and Junior Championships, then returned to 63 kg and earned gold at the 2014 Summer Youth Olympics. She competed one last time in the 63 kg division at the 2014 World Championships in Almaty, where she placed 12th, and then returned to 69 kg and captured gold at the 2015 African Games and Youth and Junior World Championships; at the latter she was named the Best Female Lifter. She placed fourth at the 2015 World Championships in Houston and took home gold at that year's Arab Championships held in Sharm el-Sheikh.

Ahmed represented Egypt at the 2016 Summer Olympics in the women's 69 kg event, skipping her high school exams in order to compete. To prepare for the Games, she attended training camps in Uzbekistan, the United Arab Emirates, and Brazil. In Rio she won a bronze medal, lifting a combined weight of 255 kg. She thus became the first Arab woman to win an Olympic weightlifting medal and the first Egyptian woman to win an Olympic medal, although Abeer Abdelrahman retroactively received a silver medal from the women's 75 kg weightlifting event at the 2012 Summer Olympics, as all three medallists in that event tested positive for banned substances and she was upgraded from fifth to third after the Games. Ahmed was also the first Egyptian to win a weightlifting medal since 1948, with the caveat that Abdelrahman and Tarek Yehia retroactively received medals from the London Games. Later in the day, Mohamed Ihab joined her in this distinction by taking bronze in the men's 77 kg.

Upon her return, she was honoured in a ceremony held by Ismailia governor Yassin Taher, received congratulatory messages from Egyptian president Abdel Fattah El-Sisi, and was given 500,000 Egyptian pounds. Soon after receiving the medal, she declared her intention to train for gold at the 2020 Summer Olympics. Following her victory, she encouraged the Egyptian government to do more to support its athletes, including granting more leniency for athletes in terms of taking college-preparatory exams. She has no special nutritional routine and is coached by the national team's Khaled Korany.

Ahmed won gold in both portions of the 69 kg division at the 2018 Mediterranean Games. The following month, at the 2018 Junior World Weightlifting Championships in Tashkent, Uzbekistan, she won all three categories of the 69 kg tournament. At the senior edition that year, she was third in the snatch and second in the clean and jerk, which placed her second overall in the 71 kg division. As of 2016 she was engaged to another Egyptian Olympic weightlifter, Ragab Abdelhay.

In 2018, Ahmed won gold at the World Junior Championships in the 69 kg. division, silver in the 71 kg. category at the senior World Championships, and gold in the 69 kg. event at the Mediterranean Games. She won the 76 kg. division at the 2019 African Weightlifting Championships and the African Games, but had her results stripped from the latter and was banned from competition for two years following violations of anti-doping regulations.

After her ban ended, Ahmed won gold in the 76 kg. category at the World Championships and the 81 kg. event at the African Weightlifting Championships in 2022. She defended both of these titles in 2023. She was also African Champion in 2024 and runner-up in the 81 kg. division at the year's World Championships. Ahmed was the official flag bearer of her country at the opening ceremony of the 2024 Summer Olympics, along with athlete Ahmed El-Gendy. In August 2024, she competed in the women's 81 kg event.She finished second with a total of 268 kg and won a silver medal.

== Major results ==
Year	Venue	Weight	Snatch (kg)				Clean & jerk (kg)				Total	Rank
Year	Venue	Weight	1	2	3	Rank	1	2	3	Rank	Total	Rank
Olympic Games
2016	Rio de Janeiro, Brazil	69 kg	107	110	112	—N/a	135	140	143	—N/a	255	3rd place, bronze medalist(s)
2024	Paris, France	81 kg	113	117	~~119~~	—N/a	146	151	~~155~~	—N/a	268	2nd place, silver medalist(s)
World Championships
2014	Almaty, Kazakhstan	63 kg	100	~~104~~	104	13	120	125	~~129~~	12	229	12
2015	Houston, United States	69 kg	105	110	~~112~~	6	135	~~138~~	~~138~~	5	245	5
2017	Anaheim, United States	69 kg	~~102~~	~~102~~	~~104~~	—	126	132	136	1st place, gold medalist(s)	—	—
2018	Ashgabat, Turkmenistan	71 kg	105	~~110~~	111	3rd place, bronze medalist(s)	136	141	—	2nd place, silver medalist(s)	252	2nd place, silver medalist(s)
2022	Bogotá, Colombia	76 kg	109	113	~~116~~	1st place, gold medalist(s)	138	143	148	1st place, gold medalist(s)	261	1st place, gold medalist(s)
2023	Riyadh, Saudi Arabia	76 kg	108	—	—	1st place, gold medalist(s)	138	—	—	1st place, gold medalist(s)	246	1st place, gold medalist(s)
2024	Manama, Bahrain	81 kg	113	~~117~~	~~117~~	4	145	149	~~153~~	2nd place, silver medalist(s)	262	2nd place, silver medalist(s)
2025	Førde, Norway	77 kg	110	112	~~115~~	2nd place, silver medalist(s)	140	~~147~~	~~150~~	2nd place, silver medalist(s)	252	2nd place, silver medalist(s)
African Games
2015	Brazzaville, Congo	69 kg	95	102	105	1st place, gold medalist(s)	126	132	~~136~~	1st place, gold medalist(s)	234	1st place, gold medalist(s)
2019	Rabat, Morocco	76 kg	105	~~111~~	~~115~~	—	133	~~141~~	—	—	DSQ	—
2024	Accra, Ghana	81 kg	100	—	—	1st place, gold medalist(s)	131	140	—	1st place, gold medalist(s)	240	1st place, gold medalist(s)
African Championships
2019	Cairo, Egypt	76 kg	105	109	112	1st place, gold medalist(s)	135	141	145	1st place, gold medalist(s)	257	1st place, gold medalist(s)
2022	Cairo, Egypt	81 kg	110	116	—	1st place, gold medalist(s)	140	145	—	1st place, gold medalist(s)	261	1st place, gold medalist(s)
2023	Tunis, Tunisia	81 kg	110	114	117	1st place, gold medalist(s)	140	146	151	1st place, gold medalist(s)	268	1st place, gold medalist(s)
2024	Ismailia, Egypt	81 kg	105	110	113	1st place, gold medalist(s)	131	140	—	1st place, gold medalist(s)	253	1st place, gold medalist(s)
Mediterranean Games
2013	Mersin, Turkey	63 kg	92	~~98~~	~~100~~	3rd place, bronze medalist(s)	112	120	124	1st place, gold medalist(s)	216	—N/a
2018	Tarragona, Spain	69 kg	100	105	~~107~~	1st place, gold medalist(s)	127	135	—	1st place, gold medalist(s)	240	—N/a
World Junior Championships
2015	Wrocław, Poland	69 kg	102	~~105~~	~~106~~	1st place, gold medalist(s)	125	128	130	1st place, gold medalist(s)	232	1st place, gold medalist(s)
2018	Tashkent, Uzbekistan	69 kg	100	105	~~107~~	1st place, gold medalist(s)	125	133	~~137~~	1st place, gold medalist(s)	238	1st place, gold medalist(s)
Youth Olympic Games
2014	Nanjing, China	63 kg	97	~~103~~	103	—N/a	118	125	~~129~~	—N/a	228	1st place, gold medalist(s)
World Youth Championships
2013	Tashkent, Uzbekistan	63 kg	92	97	101	1st place, gold medalist(s)	113	120	~~124~~	1st place, gold medalist(s)	221	1st place, gold medalist(s)
2015	Lima, Peru	69 kg	100	103	~~108~~	1st place, gold medalist(s)	125	130	133	1st place, gold medalist(s)	236	1st place, gold medalist(s)

== See also ==
- Muslim women in sport

Olympic Games
Preceded by Hedaya Malak; Alaaeldin Abouelkassem	Flagbearer for Egypt (with Ahmed El-Gendy); París 2024	Succeeded by Incumbent
