= Erin Okonek =

American weightlifter

Personal information
- Full name: Erin Okonek
- Born: 24 May 1978 (age 48)
- Weight: 68.75 kg (151.6 lb)

Sport
- Country: United States
- Sport: Weightlifting
- Weight class: 69 kg
- Team: National Team
- Updated on 13 September 2016

Erin Okonek (born 24 May 1978) is an American female weightlifter, competing in the 69 kg category and representing United States at international competitions. She competed at world championships, most recently at the 2005 World Weightlifting Championships.

== Major results ==
Year	Venue	Weight	Snatch (kg)				Clean & Jerk (kg)				Total	Rank
Year	Venue	Weight	1	2	3	Rank	1	2	3	Rank	Total	Rank
World Championships
2005	Doha, Qatar	69 kg	88	~~91~~	~~91~~	12	109	114	119	9	207.0	10
