= Iana Sotieva =

Russian weightlifter (born 2002)

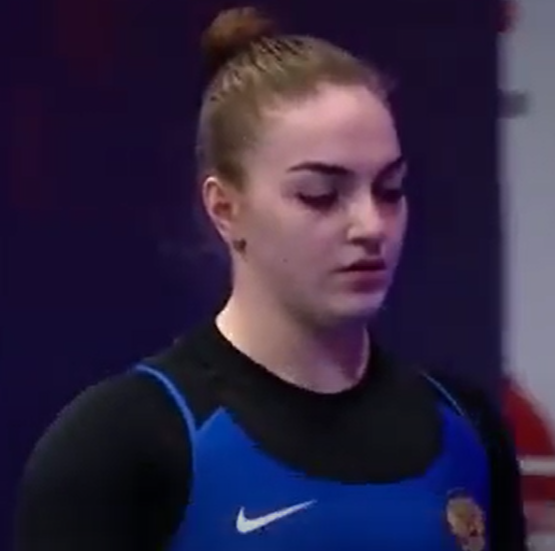

Personal information
- Native name: Яна Сотиева
- Born: 26 June 2002 (age 24)

Sport
- Country: Russia
- Sport: Weightlifting
- Weight class: 76 kg
Medal record
Women's weightlifting
European Championships
Silver medal – second place	2026 Batumi	86 kg
Representing Russian Weightlifting Federation
World Championships
Bronze medal – third place	2021 Tashkent	76 kg
Representing Russia
European Championships
Silver medal – second place	2021 Moscow	76 kg
Junior World Championships
Gold medal – first place	2021 Tashkent	76 kg
European Youth Championships
Gold medal – first place	2019 Eilat	76 kg

Iana Alanovna Sotieva (Russian: Яна Алановна Сотиева, born 26 June 2002) is a Russian weightlifter. She won the bronze medal in the women's 76 kg event at the 2021 World Weightlifting Championships held in Tashkent, Uzbekistan. She also won the silver medal in this event at the 2021 European Weightlifting Championships held in Moscow, Russia.

In 2021, she also won the gold medal in her event at the Junior World Weightlifting Championships held in Tashkent, Uzbekistan.

== Achievements ==
Year	Venue	Weight	Snatch (kg)				Clean & Jerk (kg)				Total	Rank
Year	Venue	Weight	1	2	3	Rank	1	2	3	Rank	Total	Rank
World Championships
2021	Tashkent, Uzbekistan	76 kg	108	112	~~114~~	1st place, gold medalist(s)	130	~~135~~	~~135~~	5	242	3rd place, bronze medalist(s)
European Championships
2021	Moscow, Russia	76 kg	105	110	112	2nd place, silver medalist(s)	130	134	~~137~~	2nd place, silver medalist(s)	246	2nd place, silver medalist(s)
