= Lee Min-ji (weightlifter) =

South Korean weightlifter (born 1999)

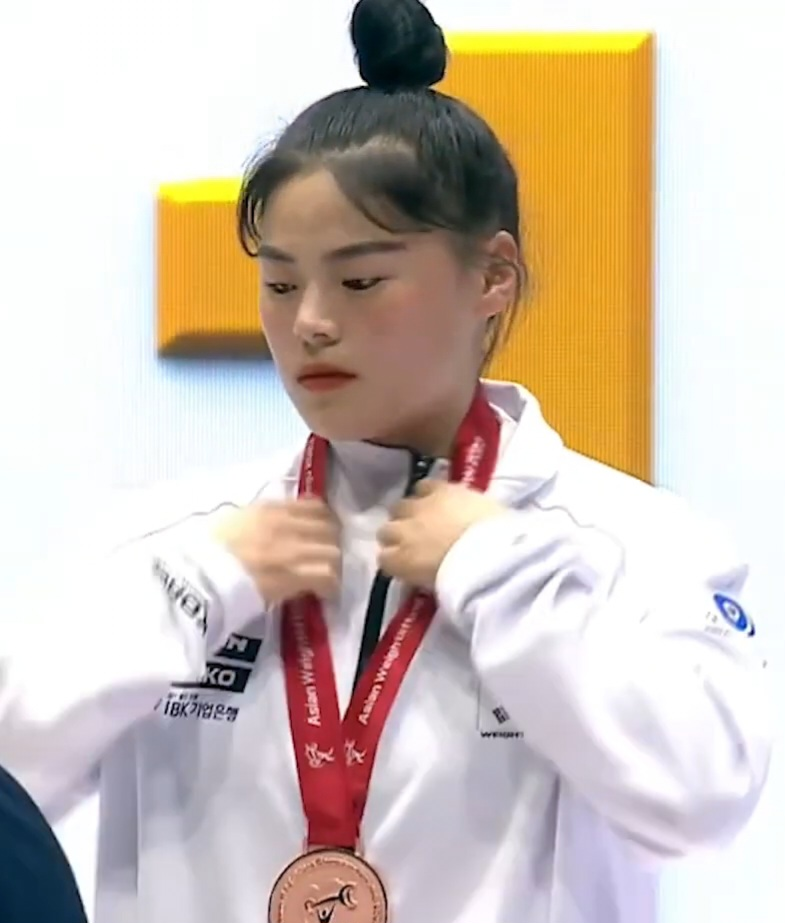

Personal information
- Native name: 이민지
- Born: 25 June 1999 (age 27)

Sport
- Country: South Korea
- Sport: Weightlifting
- Weight class: 76 kg
Medal record
Women's weightlifting
Representing South Korea
World Championships
Gold medal – first place	2021 Tashkent	76 kg
Asian Championships
Bronze medal – third place	2023 Jinju	76 kg

Lee Min-ji (born 25 June 1999) is a South Korean weightlifter. She won the gold medal in the women's 76 kg event at the 2021 World Weightlifting Championships held in Tashkent, Uzbekistan.

== Achievements ==
Year	Venue	Weight	Snatch (kg)				Clean & jerk (kg)				Total	Rank
Year	Venue	Weight	1	2	3	Rank	1	2	3	Rank	Total	Rank
World Championships
2021	Tashkent, Uzbekistan	76 kg	105	~~109~~	~~109~~	4	133	137	139	1st place, gold medalist(s)	244	1st place, gold medalist(s)
