= Iriner Jiménez =

Venezuelan weightlifter (born 1988)

Personal information
- Full name: Iriner Tahima Jiménez
- Nationality: Venezuela
- Born: 24 February 1988 (age 38)
- Height: 1.58 m (5 ft 2 in)
- Weight: 61 kg (134 lb)

Sport
- Sport: Weightlifting
- Event: 69 kg

Iriner Tahima Jiménez (born February 24, 1988) is a Venezuelan weightlifter. Jimenez represented Venezuela at the 2008 Summer Olympics in Beijing, where she competed for the women's light heavyweight category (69 kg). Jimenez, however, did not finish the event, as she successfully lifted 90 kg in the single-motion snatch, but failed to hoist 120 kg in the two-part, shoulder-to-overhead clean and jerk.
