= Rika Saito =

Japanese weightlifter

Personal information
- Nationality: Japan
- Born: 23 May 1983 (age 43) Kyoto Prefecture, Japan
- Height: 1.63 m (5 ft 4 in)
- Weight: 69 kg (152 lb)

Sport
- Sport: Weightlifting
- Event: 69 kg

Rika Saito (齋藤 里香, Saito Rika; born May 23, 1983 in Kyoto Prefecture) is a Japanese weightlifter. Saito represented Japan at the 2008 Summer Olympics in Beijing, competing in the 69 kg class of women's light heavyweight category. Saito placed eighth in this event, successfully lifting 87 kg in the snatch and 122 kg in the clean and jerk, for a total of 209 kg.
