= Xiang Yanmei =

Chinese weightlifter (born 1992)

Personal information
- Born: June 13, 1992 (age 34)
- Height: 1.63 m (5 ft 4 in)
- Weight: 69 kg (152 lb)

Sport
- Country: China
- Sport: Weightlifting
- Event: Women's 69 kg
Medal record
Representing China
Olympic Games
Gold medal – first place	2016 Rio de Janeiro	–69 kg
World Championships
Silver medal – second place	2011 Paris	–69 kg
Gold medal – first place	2013 Wrocław	–69 kg
Gold medal – first place	2015 Houston	–69 kg
Asian Games
Gold medal – first place	2014 Incheon	–69 kg
Asian Championships
Gold medal – first place	2011 Tongling	–75 kg
Junior Asian Championships
Gold medal – first place	2009 Dubai	–75 kg
National Games of China
Silver medal – second place	2009 Shandong	–75 kg
Silver medal – second place	2013 Liaoning	–69 kg
Gold medal – first place	2017 Tianjin	–69 kg
Gold medal – first place	2021 Shaanxi	–76 kg

Xiang Yanmei (Chinese: 向艳梅; born 13 June 1992 in Baojing, Hunan) is a Chinese weightlifter. She won a gold medal at the 2016 Summer Olympics in the Women's 69 kg category.

In 2015, Xiang was nominated for CCTV's best female athlete of the year award.
