= Nataliya Davydova =

Ukrainian weightlifter (born 1985)

Personal information
- Born: 22 July 1985 (age 40) Sherlovaya Gora, Zabaykalsky Krai, Russian SFSR, Soviet Union
Medal record
Women's Weightlifting
Representing Ukraine
Olympic Games
Disqualified	2008 Beijing	– 69 kg
World Championships
Bronze medal – third place	2007 Chiang Mai	– 69 kg
European Championships
Silver medal – second place	2006 Wladyslawowo	– 69 kg
Bronze medal – third place	2005 Sofia	– 69 kg
Bronze medal – third place	2007 Strasbourg	– 69 kg

Nataliya Anatoliyivna Davydova (Ukrainian: Наталія Анатоліївна Давидова) (born 22 July 1985 in Sherlovaya Gora, Chita Oblast, Russian SFSR, Soviet Union) is a Ukrainian weightlifter.

== Career ==
She won the bronze medal in the 69 kg category at the 2005 Junior World Championships, with a total of 233 kg.

At the 2005 World Weightlifting Championships she ranked 7th in the 69 kg category, and at the 2006 World Weightlifting Championships she ranked 4th in the same category, lifting a total of 237 kg.

Davydova won bronze medal at the 2007 World Weightlifting Championships in the 69 kg category, with a total of 244 kg.

At the 2008 Summer Olympics she was initially awarded the bronze medal in the 69 kg category, with a total of 250 kg. On 17 November 2016 the IOC disqualified Davydova from the 2008 Olympic Games, stripped her Olympic medal and struck her results from the record for failing a drugs test in a re-analysis of her doping sample from 2008.
