= Ryo Un-hui =

North Korean weightlifter (born 1994)

Personal information
- Nationality: North Korean
- Born: 9 August 1994 (age 31)
- Weight: 68.61 kg (151.3 lb)

Korean name
- Hangul: 려은희
- RR: Ryeo Eunhui
- MR: Ryŏ Ŭnhŭi

Sport
- Sport: weightlifting
- Team: Kigwancha Sports Team

Achievements and titles
- Personal bests: Snatch: 121 kg (2014); Clean and jerk: 146 kg (2012); Total: 265kg (2014)
Medal record
Representing North Korea
World Championships
Gold medal – first place	2014 Almaty	–69 kg
Silver medal – second place	2013 Wrocław	–69 kg
Asian Games
Silver medal – second place	2014 Incheon	–69 kg
Asian Championships
Gold medal – first place	2013 Astana	–69 kg

Ryo Un-hui (Korean: 려은희; born 9 August 1994) is a North Korean weightlifter. She competed at the 2013 World Championships in the Women's 69 kg, winning the Silver medal. She competed at the 2014 Asian Games in Incheon, South Korea. Ryo represents the Kigwancha Sports Team.

== Major results ==
Year	Venue	Weight	Snatch (kg)				Clean & Jerk (kg)				Total	Rank
Year	Venue	Weight	1	2	3	Rank	1	2	3	Rank	Total	Rank
World Championships
2013	Wrocław, Poland	69 kg	115	~~118~~	119	2nd place, silver medalist(s)	~~143~~	143	~~147~~	3rd place, bronze medalist(s)	262	2nd place, silver medalist(s)
2014	Almaty, Kazakhstan	69 kg	115	120	~~122~~	1st place, gold medalist(s)	141	145	~~147~~	1st place, gold medalist(s)	265	1st place, gold medalist(s)
Asian Games
2014	Incheon, South Korea	69 kg	113	118	121	1	~~140~~	140	141	2	262	2nd place, silver medalist(s)
Asian Championships
2013	Astana, Kazakhstan	69 kg	113	116	118	1st place, gold medalist(s)	142	145	~~146~~	1st place, gold medalist(s)	263	1st place, gold medalist(s)
