= Huang Shih-hsu =

Taiwanese weightlifter (born 1975)

Personal information
- Nationality: Taiwanese
- Born: 30 November 1975 (age 50) Pingtung, Taiwan
- Height: 1.6 m (5 ft 3 in)
- Weight: 68 kg (150 lb)

Sport
- Country: Chinese Taipei
- Sport: Weightlifting
- Weight class: 69 kg
- Team: National team
Medal record
Representing Chinese Taipei
Women's weightlifting
World Championships
| Bronze medal – third place | 2011 Paris | -69 kg |
Asian Games
| Bronze medal – third place | 2014 Incheon | -69 kg |
- Updated on 11 October 2016

Huang Shih-hsu (Chinese: 黃釋緒; pinyin: Huáng Shìxù; born 30 November 1975 in Pingtung, Taiwan, old name: Huang Shih-chun and Huang Pei-yi) is a Taiwanese weightlifter representing Chinese Taipei. She participated at the 2010 Asian Games in the 69 kg event finishing 5th. She competed at the 2012 Summer Olympics in the -69 kg event, finishing in 7th place. At the same event in the 2014 Asian Games, she claimed third place.
