= Anni Vuohijoki =

Finnish weightlifter (born 1988)

Personal information
- Full name: Anni Teija Orvokki Vuohijoki
- Born: 24 May 1988 (age 38) Nakkila, Finland
- Height: 1.62 m (5 ft 4 in)
- Weight: 62 kg (137 lb)

Sport
- Country: Finland
- Sport: Weightlifting
- Event: Women's 63 kg
Medal record
European Championships
Bronze medal – third place	2018 Bucharest	–63 kg

Anni Vuohijoki (born 24 May 1988) is a Finnish former Olympian weightlifter. She competed in the women's 63 kg event at the 2016 Summer Olympics.

Vuohijoki is also junior Powerlifting Champion from 2010 and adults Champion from 2011. From 2013 onwards, she focused on weightlifting.

In February 2023, she announced to end her weightlifting career to the European Championships of the year.
