= Assiya İpek =

Turkish weightlifter

Personal information
- Nationality: Turkish
- Born: December 5, 1993 (age 31)
- Height: 1.68 m (5 ft 6 in)
- Weight: 70 kg (150 lb)

Sport
- Country: Turkey
- Sport: Weightlifting
- Event: 69 kg

Assiya İpek (born December 5, 1993) is a Turkish weightlifter competing in the 69 kg division.

İpek earned a quota spot for the 2016 Summer Olympics.
