= Dzina Sazanavets =

Belarusian weightlifter (born 1990)

Medal record

Women's Weightlifting

Representing Belarus

World Championships
Silver medal – second place	2013 Wrocław	– 69 kg

European Championships
Gold medal – first place	2015 Tbilisi	– 69 kg

Dzina Sazanavets (born 25 October 1990 in Klichaw, Belarus) is a weightlifter representing Belarus. She was placed fourth at the 2012 Summer Olympics at the women's 69 kg event, just after her country-mate Maryna Shkermankova. In October 2016, the IOC disqualified her from the 2012 Olympics and annulled her result after her Olympic doping sample was retested and failed.
