= Marie-Josée Arès-Pilon =

Canadian weightlifter (born 1982)

Personal information
- Nationality: Canadian
- Born: 30 April 1982 (age 44) Edmonton, Alberta
- Height: 1.65 m (5 ft 5 in)
- Weight: 68 kg (150 lb)

Sport
- Sport: Weightlifting
Medal record
Weightlifting
Commonwealth Games
Bronze medal – third place	2014 Glasgow	69 kg
- Updated on 2 August 2014

Marie-Josée Arès-Pilon (born 30 April 1982) is a weightlifter competing for Canada. She won a bronze medal in the women's 69 kg competition with a total lift of 214 kg at the 2014 Commonwealth Games in Glasgow.
