= Liu Haixia =

Chinese weightlifter (born 1980)

Personal information
- Nationality: Chinese
- Born: 23 October 1980 (age 45)
- Weight: 67.10 kg (148 lb)

Sport
- Country: China
- Sport: Weightlifting
- Event: –69 kg
Medal record
Representing China
World Championships
Gold medal – first place	2007 Chaing Mai	–63 kg
Silver medal – second place	2005 Doha	–69 kg

Liu Haixia (Chinese: 刘海霞; born 23 October 1980) is a former Chinese weightlifter, and world champion competing in the −63 kg and −69 kg division.

== Career ==
At the 2007 World Weightlifting Championships she won the gold medal in the 63 kg division while also setting a new senior world record in the total with 257 kg.

== Major results ==
Year	Venue	Weight	Snatch (kg)				Clean & Jerk (kg)				Total	Rank
Year	Venue	Weight	1	2	3	Rank	1	2	3	Rank	Total	Rank
World Championships
2005	Doha, Qatar	69 kg	110	118	120	1st place, gold medalist(s)	145	150	154 WR	2nd place, silver medalist(s)	274	2nd place, silver medalist(s)
2007	Chiang Mai, Thailand	63 kg	110	113	115	1st place, gold medalist(s)	135	140	142	1st place, gold medalist(s)	257 WR	1st place, gold medalist(s)
