= Natasha Perdue =

British weightlifter

Personal information
- Born: 27 July 1975 (age 51) Swansea
- Height: 1.61 m (5 ft 3 1/2 in)
- Weight: 69 kg (152 lb)

Sport
- Country: United Kingdom
- Sport: Weightlifting
- Event: 69kg
- Updated on 26 July 2012

Natasha Perdue (born 27 July 1975) is a British weightlifter who competed for Great Britain at the 2012 Olympic Games in London. Perdue's father Terry Perdue was also a weightlifter and competed at the 1968 and 1972 Olympics.
