= Oxana Slivenko =

Russian weightlifter (born 1986)

Oksana Slivenko
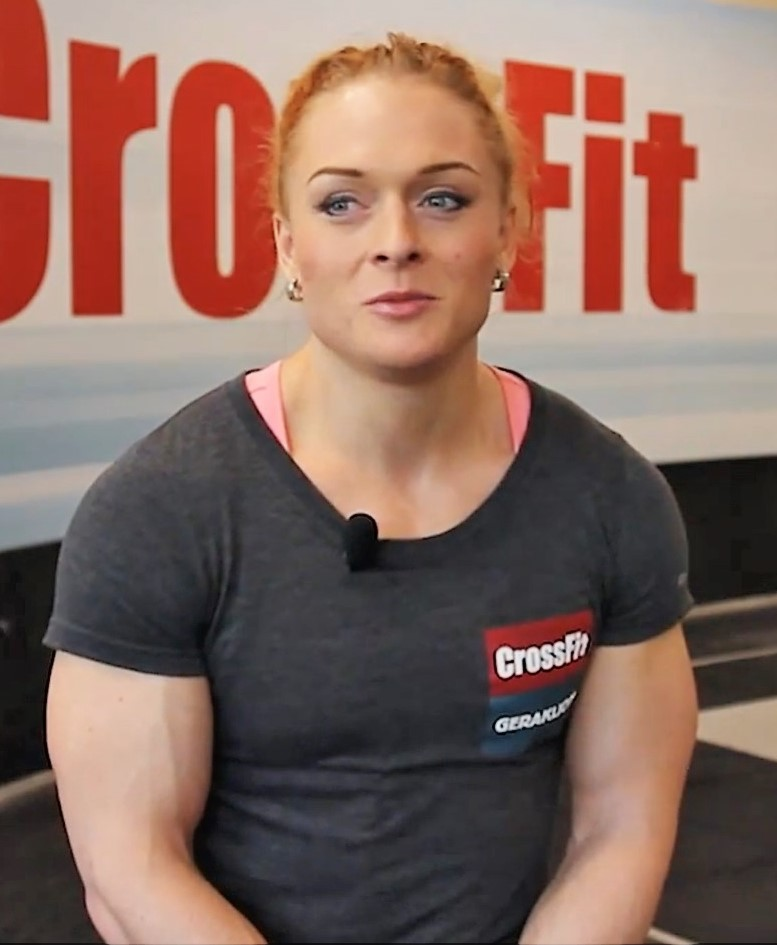
- Slivenko in 2013

Personal information
- Born: 20 December 1986 (age 39) Chekhov, Moscow Oblast, Russian SFSR, Soviet Union
- Height: 1.64 m (5 ft 4 1/2 in)
- Weight: 69 kg (152 lb)

Sport
- Country: Russia
- Sport: Weightlifting
- Event: 69kg
- Turned pro: 2001
- Coached by: Vyacheslav Rubin; Vladimir
Medal record
Olympic Games
Gold medal – first place	2008 Beijing	−69 kg
World Championships
Gold medal – first place	2006 Santo Domingo	−69 kg
Gold medal – first place	2007 Chiang Mai	−69 kg
Gold medal – first place	2011 Paris	−69 kg
Silver medal – second place	2009 Goyang	−69 kg
European Championships
Gold medal – first place	2007 Strasbourg	−69 kg
Gold medal – first place	2009 Bucharest	−69 kg
Gold medal – first place	2010 Minsk	−69 kg
Gold medal – first place	2011 Kazan	−69 kg
Disqualified	2012 Antalya	−69 kg
Disqualified	2013 Tirana	−69 kg
- Updated on 26 July 2012

Oksana Nikolayevna Slivenko (Russian: Оксана Николаевна Сливенко; born 20 December 1986 in Chekhov, Moscow Oblast), known professionally as Oxana Slivenko, is a Russian weightlifter.

== Career ==
She won the silver medal at the 2005 Junior World Championships in the 63 kg category, and again at the 2006 Junior World Championships in the 69 kg category.

Slivenko participated in the women's 69 kg class at the 2006 World Weightlifting Championships and won the gold medal, with a World Record snatch of 123 kg, and clean and jerking an additional 140 kg for a total of 263 kg.

At the 2007 World Weightlifting Championships she won the gold medal again in the 69 kg class, with a World Record total of 276 kg.

She won the silver medal in the 69 kg category at the 2008 Summer Olympics, with a total of 255 kg but was upgraded to gold as the original gold medalist, Liu Chunhong from China, was disqualified for doping.

Slivenko was forced to withdraw from London Olympics in 2012 after suffering an injury in a training session.

In 2018, Slivenko received a two-year ban for using performance-enhancing drugs.

== Career statistics ==
Date	Tournament	Venue	Weight category	Snatch	Rank	Clean and jerk	Rank	Overall	Rank
2006-10-02	World Championships	Santo Domingo, Dominican Republic	−69 kg	123.0 kg	1st	140.0 kg	1st	263.0 kg	1st
2007-04-17	European Championships	Strasbourg, France	−69 kg	112.0 kg	1st	145.0 kg	1st	257.0 kg	1st
2007-09-17	World Championships	Chiang Mai, Thailand	−69 kg	120.0 kg	2nd	156.0 kg	1st	276.0 kg	1st
2008-08-08	Olympic Games	Beijing, China	−69 kg	115.0 kg	–	140.0 kg	–	255.0 kg	1st
2011-04-15	European Championships	Kazan, Russia	−69 kg	120.0 kg	1st	145.0 kg	1st	265.0 kg	1st
