= Liu Chunhong =

Chinese weightlifter (born 1985)

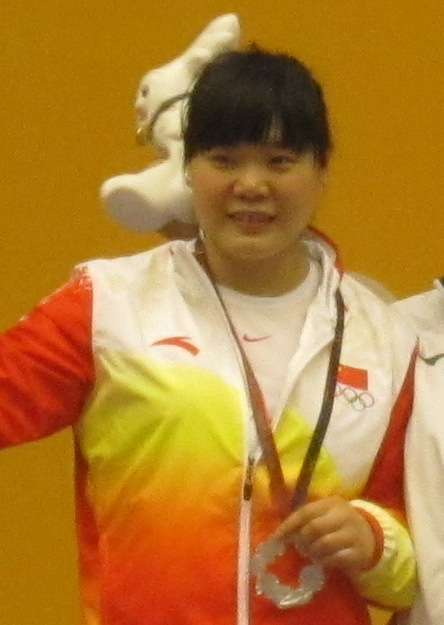

Personal information
- Born: January 29, 1985 (age 41) Zhaoyuan, Shandong
- Height: 1.65 m (5 ft 5 in)

Sport
- Weight class: 69 kg
Medal record
Olympic Games
Gold medal – first place	2004 Athens	– 69 kg
Disqualified	2008 Beijing	– 69 kg
World Championships
Gold medal – first place	2004 Vancouver	– 69 kg
Gold medal – first place	2005 Doha	– 75 kg
Silver medal – second place	2007 Chiang Mai	– 69 kg
Asian Games
Gold medal – first place	2002 Busan	69 kg
Gold medal – first place	2010 Guangzhou	69 kg

Liu Chunhong (Chinese: 刘春红; pinyin: Liú Chūnhóng; born January 29, 1985, in Zhaoyuan, Shandong Province) is a Chinese weightlifter.

== Career ==
At the 2003 World Weightlifting Championships she won in the 69 kg category with a total of ten new world records and junior world records.

She competed in the 2004 Summer Olympics, and won the gold medal in the 69 kg class.

At the 2007 World Weightlifting Championships she won the snatch competition in the 69 kg category with 121 kg, and won the silver medal lifting in total 271 kg.

At the 2008 Summer Olympics she won the gold medal in the 69 kg category, while setting new Olympic and world records in both the snatch and clean and jerk with a lift of 128 kg and 158 kg respectively for a world record total of 286 kg. This total would have been enough to win gold and set the Olympic record in the 75 kg category (heavyweight), as well as tie Svetlana Podobedova's then world record in that category. She became the first ever woman to defend her Olympic title in weightlifting.

On January 12, 2017 it was announced that because of a doping violation she had been disqualified from the 2008 Olympic Games.

== Personal bests (69 kg) ==
- Snatch: 128 kg (2008 Summer Olympics, disqualified in 2017)
- Clean and Jerk: 158 kg (2008 Summer Olympics, disqualified in 2017)
- Total: 286 kg (2008 Summer Olympics, disqualified in 2017)

=== Other ===
- Jerk (off rack): 175 kg (training claim)
- Front Squat: 200.0 kg
- Back Squat: 230.0 kg (Raw women's 69 kg all-time world record)
