= Zarema Kasaeva =

Russian weightlifter (born 1987)

Zarema Kasayeva
Personal information
- Born: February 25, 1987 (age 39)
Medal record
Women's Weightlifting
Representing Russia
Olympic Games
Bronze medal – third place	2004 Athens	– 69 kg
World Championships
Gold medal – first place	2005 Doha	– 69 kg
Bronze medal – third place	2006 Santo Domingo	– 75 kg
European Championships
Gold medal – first place	2005 Sofia	– 69 kg
Bronze medal – third place	2003 Loutraki	– 69 kg

Zarema Kasaeva (born February 25, 1987) is a Russian weightlifter. Kasaeva became an Olympic medalist during the 2004 Summer Olympics when she won the bronze medal in the women's -69 kg class.

At the 2005 World Weightlifting Championships she won the gold medal in the 69 kg category, with a world record clean and jerk of 157 kg, and a total of 275 kg.

Kasaeva participated in the women's -75 kg class at the 2006 World Weightlifting Championships and won the bronze medal, finishing behind Cao Lei and Nadezhda Evstyukhina. She snatched 110 kg and clean and jerked an additional 136 kg for a total of 246 kg, 22 kg behind winner Cao.

== Career statistics ==
Date	Tournament	Venue	Weight category	Snatch	Rank	Clean and jerk	Rank	Overall	Rank
2002-11-23	World Championships	Warsaw, Poland	-69 kg	100.0 kg	7th	125.0 kg	9th	225.0 kg	7th
2003-04-22	European Championships	Loutraki, Greece	-69 kg	105.0 kg	4th	130.0 kg	3rd	235.0 kg	3rd
2003-11-17	World Championships	Vancouver, Canada	-69 kg	112.5 kg	5th	132.5 kg	5th	245.0 kg	5th
2004-08-15	Olympic Games	Athens, Greece	-69 kg	117.5 kg	-	145.0 kg	-	262.5 kg	3rd
2005-04-22	European Championships	Sofia, Bulgaria	-69 kg	120.0 kg	1st	145.5 kg	1st	265.5 kg	1st
2005-11-09	World Championships	Doha, Qatar	-69 kg	118.0 kg	2nd	157.0 kg	1st	275.0 kg	1st
2006-10-02	World Championships	Santo Domingo, Dominican Republic	-75 kg	110.0 kg	4th	136.0 kg	3rd	246.0 kg	3rd
2007-04-17	European Championships	Strasbourg, France	-69 kg	100.0 kg	4th	128.0 kg	4th	228.0 kg	4th
