= Weightlifting at the 2014 Central American and Caribbean Games =

- Venue: Coatzacoalcos Convention Center
- Location: (Mexico) Veracruz
- Dates: 20–23 November

The weightlifting competition at the 2014 Central American and Caribbean Games was held in Veracruz, Mexico.

The tournament was scheduled to be held from 20–23 November at the Coatzacoalcos Convention Center.

== Medal summary ==
=== Men's events ===
Event	Gold		Silver		Bronze	
56 kg Snatch	Carlos Berna (COL)	112 kg	Luis García (DOM)	110 kg	Edouard Joseph (HAI)	110 kg
56 kg Clean&Jerk	Carlos Berna (COL)	142 kg	Luis García (DOM)	141 kg	Edouard Joseph (HAI)	135 kg
62 kg Snatch	Francisco Mosquera (COL)	130 kg	Julio Salamanca (ESA)	120 kg	Jesús López (VEN)	120 kg
62 kg Clean&Jerk	Francisco Mosquera (COL)	171 kg	Julio Salamanca (ESA)	160 kg	José Montes (MEX)	148 kg
69 kg Snatch	Doyler Sánchez (COL)	143 kg	Edwin Mosquera (COL)	141 kg	Edwar Vasquez (VEN)	131 kg
69 kg Clean&Jerk	Doyler Sánchez (COL)	171 kg	Edwin Mosquera (COL)	166 kg	Edwar Vasquez (VEN)	165 kg
77 kg Snatch	Junior Sánchez (VEN)	157 kg	Iván Cambar (CUB)	153 kg	Domingo Roman (MEX)	143 kg
77 kg Clean&Jerk	Iván Cambar (CUB)	191 kg	Juan Peña Mejía (DOM)	179 kg	Domingo Roman (MEX)	175 kg
85 kg Snatch	Yoelmis Hernández (CUB)	160 kg	Yadier Núñez (CUB)	154 kg	Renzo Balza (VEN)	153 kg
85 kg Clean&Jerk	Yoelmis Hernández (CUB)	205 kg	Yadier Nunez (CUB)	195 kg	Renzo Balza (VEN)	185 kg
94 kg Snatch	Javier Vanega (CUB)	163 kg	Wilmer Torres (COL)	157 kg	Herbys Márquez (VEN)	150 kg
94 kg Clean&Jerk	Wilmer Torres (COL)	202 kg	Javier Vanega (CUB)	202 kg	Herbys Márquez (VEN)	200 kg
105 kg Snatch	Alejandro Cisneros (CUB)	169 kg	José Familia (DOM)	169 kg	Asniel Rodríguez (CUB)	169 kg
105 kg Clean&Jerk	Alejandro Cisneros (CUB)	205 kg	José Familia (DOM)	204 kg	Asniel Rodríguez (CUB)	204 kg
+105 kg Snatch	Alberto Pupo (CUB)	170 kg	Fredy Renteria (COL)	170 kg	Joel Morales (VEN)	158 kg
+105 kg Clean&Jerk	Joel Morales (VEN)	212 kg	Alberto Pupo (CUB)	205 kg	Luis Hoil (GUA)	185 kg

=== Women's events ===
Event	Gold		Silver		Bronze	
48 kg Snatch	Beatriz Pirón (DOM)	77 kg	Cándida Vásquez (DOM)	76 kg	Lely Burgos (PUR)	73 kg
48 kg Clean&Jerk	Cándida Vásquez (DOM)	97 kg	Beatriz Pirón (DOM)	96 kg	Betsi Rivas (VEN)	94 kg
53 kg Snatch	Génesis Rodríguez (VEN)	91 kg	Yuderqui Contreras (DOM)	90 kg	Rusmeris Villar (COL)	85 kg
53 kg Clean&Jerk	Rusmeris Villar (COL)	109 kg	Génesis Rodríguez (VEN)	108 kg	Estebana Osorio (ESA)	93 kg
58 kg Snatch	Yenny Álvarez (COL)	99 kg	Lina Rivas (COL)	98 kg	Yusleidy Figueroa (VEN)	95 kg
58 kg Clean&Jerk	Yenny Álvarez (COL)	123 kg	Lina Rivas (COL)	121 kg	Yusleidy Figueroa (VEN)	120 kg
63 kg Snatch	Mercedes Pérez (COL)	101 kg	Eva Gurrola (MEX)	89 kg	Ana Lillia Duran (MEX)	88 kg
63 kg Clean&Jerk	Mercedes Pérez (COL)	132 kg	Ana Lillia Duran (MEX)	117 kg	Eva Gurrola (MEX)	116 kg
69 kg Snatch	Leydi Solís (COL)	104 kg	Dayana Chirinos (VEN)	99 kg	Aremi Fuentes (MEX)	90 kg
69 kg Clean&Jerk	Leydi Solís (COL)	135 kg	Dayana Chirinos (VEN)	121 kg	Aremi Fuentes (MEX)	120 kg
75 kg Snatch	Ubaldina Valoyes (COL)	110 kg	Yarvanis Herrera (VEN)	103 kg	Daysi Hutchinson (CRC)	91 kg
75 kg Clean&Jerk	Ubaldina Valoyes (COL)	133 kg	Yarvanis Herrera (VEN)	123 kg	Daysi Hutchinson (CRC)	105 kg
+75 kg Snatch	Tania Mascorro (MEX)	118 kg	Veronica Tolentino (DOM)	107 kg	Lexys Diago (CUB)	106 kg
+75 kg Clean&Jerk	Yaniuska Espinosa (VEN)	141 kg	Tania Mascorro (MEX)	140 kg	Lexys Diago (CUB)	132 kg

== Medal table ==
* Host nation (Mexico)

Rank	Nation	Gold	Silver	Bronze	Total
1	Colombia (COL)	16	6	1	23
2	Cuba (CUB)	7	5	4	16
3	Venezuela (VEN)	4	5	11	20
4	Dominican Republic (DOM)	2	9	0	11
5	Mexico (MEX)*	1	3	7	11
6	El Salvador (ESA)	0	2	1	3
7	Costa Rica (CRC)	0	0	2	2
7	Haiti (HAI)	0	0	2	2
9	Guatemala (GUA)	0	0	1	1
9	Puerto Rico (PUR)	0	0	1	1
Totals (10 entries)		30	30	30	90
