= 2014 Pan American Weightlifting Championships =

International weightlifting competition

2014 Pan American Championships
- Host city: Santo Domingo, Dominican Republic
- Dates: May 26–June 2
- Main venue: Pabellón de Halterofilia Dr. José Joaquín Puello

The 2014 Pan American Weightlifting Championships were held at the Pabellón de Halterofilia Dr. José Joaquín Puello in Santo Domingo, Dominican Republic. The event took place from May 26 to June 2, 2014.

== Medal summary ==
=== Men ===
Event	Gold		Silver		Bronze	
56 kg
Snatch	Habib de las Salas; Colombia	111 kg	Ronald Peña; Dominican Republic	108 kg	Walter Zurita; Ecuador	107 kg
Clean & Jerk	Habib de las Salas; Colombia	147 kg	Francisco Barrera; Chile	136 kg	Joseph Edouard; Haiti	135 kg
Total	Habib de las Salas; Colombia	258 kg	Francisco Barrera; Chile	241 kg	Ronald Peña; Dominican Republic	238 kg
62 kg
Snatch	Francisco Mosquera; Colombia	124 kg	Lázaro Ruiz; Cuba	123 kg	Julio Mayora; Venezuela	118 kg
Clean & Jerk	Francisco Mosquera; Colombia	160 kg	Julio Salamanca Pineda; El Salvador	154 kg	José Montes; Mexico	151 kg
Total	Francisco Mosquera; Colombia	284 kg	Lázaro Ruiz; Cuba	273 kg	Julio Salamanca Pineda; El Salvador	271 kg
69 kg
Snatch	Óscar Figueroa; Colombia	140 kg	Ediel Marquez; Cuba	138 kg	Edwar Vasquez; Venezuela	138 kg
Clean & Jerk	Óscar Figueroa; Colombia	180 kg	Ediel Marquez; Cuba	167 kg	Erik Herrera; Ecuador	165 kg
Total	Óscar Figueroa; Colombia	320 kg	Ediel Marquez; Cuba	305 kg	Edwar Vasquez; Venezuela	303 kg
77 kg
Snatch	Junior Sánchez; Venezuela	157 kg	Iván Cambar; Cuba	156 kg	Gabriel Mena; Colombia	145 kg
Clean & Jerk	Iván Cambar; Cuba	185 kg	Travis Cooper; United States	184 kg	Yony Andica; Colombia	181 kg
Total	Iván Cambar; Cuba	341 kg	Junior Sánchez; Venezuela	337 kg	Travis Cooper; United States	324 kg
85 kg
Snatch	Yoelmis Hernández; Cuba	162 kg	Yadier Nuñez; Cuba	157 kg	Ferney Manzano; Colombia	156 kg
Clean & Jerk	Yoelmis Hernández; Cuba	202 kg	Yadier Nuñez; Cuba	195 kg	Ferney Manzano; Colombia	193 kg
Total	Yoelmis Hernández; Cuba	364 kg	Yadier Nuñez; Cuba	352 kg	Ferney Manzano; Colombia	349 kg
94 kg
Snatch	Javier Vanega; Cuba	170 kg	D'Angelo Osorio; United States	160 kg	Freddy Tenorio; Ecuador	157 kg
Clean & Jerk	Wilmer Torres; Colombia	205 kg	Javier Vanega; Cuba	205 kg	Herbys Márquez; Venezuela	200 kg
Total	Javier Vanega; Cuba	375 kg	Wilmer Torres; Colombia	360 kg	D'Angelo Osorio; United States	356 kg
105 kg
Snatch	Jorge Arroyo; Ecuador	180 kg	Ian Wilson; United States	173 kg	Mateus Gregório; Brazil	167 kg
Clean & Jerk	Alejandro Cisneros; Cuba	206 kg	Jorge Arroyo; Ecuador	205 kg	Ian Wilson; United States	200 kg
Total	Jorge Arroyo; Ecuador	385 kg	Ian Wilson; United States	373 kg	Mateus Gregório; Brazil	364 kg
+105 kg
Snatch	Fernando Reis; Brazil	187 kg	Fredy Renteria; Colombia	186 kg	Caine Wilkes; United States	178 kg
Clean & Jerk	Caine Wilkes; United States	221 kg	Yoel Morales; Venezuela	220 kg	Alberto Pupo; Cuba	218 kg
Total	Caine Wilkes; United States	399 kg	Fredy Renteria; Colombia	396 kg	Alberto Pupo; Cuba	388 kg

=== Women ===
Event	Gold		Silver		Bronze	
48 kg
Snatch	Georgina Silvestre; Dominican Republic	79 kg	Cándida Vásquez; Dominican Republic	79 kg	Ana Segura; Colombia	76 kg
Clean & Jerk	Cándida Vásquez; Dominican Republic	96 kg	Lely Burgos; Puerto Rico	95 kg	Georgina Silvestre; Dominican Republic	94 kg
Total	Cándida Vásquez; Dominican Republic	175 kg	Georgina Silvestre; Dominican Republic	173 kg	Lely Burgos; Puerto Rico	168 kg
53 kg
Snatch	Yuderqui Contreras; Dominican Republic	97 kg	Rosane Santos; Brazil	85 kg	Rusmeris Villar; Colombia	83 kg
Clean & Jerk	Rusmeris Villar; Colombia	110 kg	Yuderqui Contreras; Dominican Republic	110 kg	Vanessa Quiñonez; Colombia	103 kg
Total	Yuderqui Contreras; Dominican Republic	207 kg	Rusmeris Villar; Colombia	193 kg	Rosane Santos; Brazil	183 kg
58 kg
Snatch	Yineisy Reyes; Dominican Republic	92 kg	Patricia Domínguez; Mexico	90 kg	Yusleidy Figueroa; Venezuela	90 kg
Clean & Jerk	Yusleidy Figueroa; Venezuela	119 kg	Yineisy Reyes; Dominican Republic	112 kg	Jenifer Hernandez; Ecuador	110 kg
Total	Yusleidy Figueroa; Venezuela	209 kg	Yineisy Reyes; Dominican Republic	204 kg	Patricia Domínguez; Mexico	199 kg
63 kg
Snatch	Alexandra Escobar; Ecuador	102 kg	Mercedes Pérez; Colombia	102 kg	Geralee Vega; United States	98 kg
Clean & Jerk	Mercedes Pérez; Colombia	126 kg	Geralee Vega; United States	125 kg	Alexandra Escobar; Ecuador	125 kg
Total	Mercedes Pérez; Colombia	228 kg	Alexandra Escobar; Ecuador	227 kg	Geralee Vega; United States	223 kg
69 kg
Snatch	Leydi Solís; Colombia	107 kg	Dayana Chirinos; Venezuela	95 kg	Eva Gurrola; Mexico	93 kg
Clean & Jerk	Leydi Solís; Colombia	130 kg	Dayana Chirinos; Venezuela	121 kg	Liliane Menezes; Brazil	120 kg
Total	Leydi Solís; Colombia	237 kg	Dayana Chirinos; Venezuela	216 kg	Martha Malla; Ecuador	210 kg
75 kg
Snatch	Ubaldina Valoyes; Colombia	111 kg	Cinthya Domínguez; Mexico	102 kg	María Valdés; Chile	101 kg
Clean & Jerk	Ubaldina Valoyes; Colombia	136 kg	Jenny Arthur; United States	131 kg	Cinthya Domínguez; Mexico	127 kg
Total	Ubaldina Valoyes; Colombia	247 kg	Jenny Arthur; United States	231 kg	Cinthya Domínguez; Mexico	229 kg
+75 kg
Snatch	Tania Mascorro; Mexico	113 kg	Yaniuska Espinosa; Venezuela	111 kg	Verónica Saladín; Dominican Republic	106 kg
Clean & Jerk	Naryury Perez; Venezuela	140 kg	Yaniuska Espinosa; Venezuela	140 kg	Chioma Amaechi; United States	137 kg
Total	Yaniuska Espinosa; Venezuela	251 kg	Tania Mascorro; Mexico	248 kg	Naryury Perez; Venezuela	245 kg

== Medal table ==
Ranking by Big (Total result) medals

Rank	Nation	Gold	Silver	Bronze	Total
1	Colombia (COL)	6	3	1	10
2	Cuba (CUB)	3	3	1	7
3	Venezuela (VEN)	2	2	2	6
4	Dominican Republic (DOM)	2	2	1	5
5	United States (USA)	1	2	3	6
6	Ecuador (ECU)	1	1	1	3
7	Mexico (MEX)	0	1	2	3
8	Chile (CHI)	0	1	0	1
9	Brazil (BRA)	0	0	2	2
10	El Salvador (ESA)	0	0	1	1
10	Puerto Rico (PUR)	0	0	1	1
Totals (11 entries)		15	15	15	45

Ranking by all medals: Big (Total result) and Small (Snatch and Clean & Jerk)

Rank	Nation	Gold	Silver	Bronze	Total
1	Colombia (COL)	19	5	8	32
2	Cuba (CUB)	8	10	2	20
3	Dominican Republic (DOM)	6	6	3	15
4	Venezuela (VEN)	5	7	6	18
5	Ecuador (ECU)	3	2	6	11
6	United States (USA)	2	7	7	16
7	Mexico (MEX)	1	3	5	9
8	Brazil (BRA)	1	1	4	6
9	Chile (CHI)	0	2	1	3
10	El Salvador (ESA)	0	1	1	2
10	Puerto Rico (PUR)	0	1	1	2
12	Haiti (HAI)	0	0	1	1
Totals (12 entries)		45	45	45	135
