= 2016 Pan American Weightlifting Championships =

International weightlifting competition

2016 Pan American Championships
- Host city: Cartagena, Colombia
- Dates: June 6 – 11

The 2016 Pan American Weightlifting Championships was held in Cartagena, Colombia between June 6 and June 11, 2016.

== Medal summary ==
Results are obtained from the IWF website.

=== Men ===
Event	Gold		Silver		Bronze	
56 kg
Snatch	Habib de las Salas; Colombia	118 kg	Carlos Berna; Colombia	112 kg	Luis Garcia; Dominican Republic	110 kg
Clean & Jerk	Habib de las Salas; Colombia	150 kg	Carlos Berna; Colombia	150 kg	José Montes; Mexico	150 kg
Total	Habib de las Salas; Colombia	268 kg	Carlos Berna; Colombia	262 kg	José Montes; Mexico	260 kg
62 kg
Snatch	Francisco Mosquera; Colombia	135 kg	Jesús López; Venezuela	125 kg	Julio Acosta; Chile	120 kg
Clean & Jerk	Francisco Mosquera; Colombia	170 kg	Julio Salamanca; El Salvador	157 kg	Antonio Vázquez; Mexico	155 kg
Total	Francisco Mosquera; Colombia	305 kg	Julio Salamanca; El Salvador	274 kg	Antonio Vázquez; Mexico	270 kg
69 kg
Snatch	Luis Javier Mosquera; Colombia	148 kg	Bredni Roque Mendoza; Mexico	148 kg	Edwin Mosquera; Colombia	148 kg
Clean & Jerk	Bredni Roque Mendoza; Mexico	188 kg	Edwin Mosquera; Colombia	175 kg	Erik Herrera; Ecuador	164 kg
Total	Bredni Roque Mendoza; Mexico	336 kg	Edwin Mosquera; Colombia	323 kg	Erik Herrera; Ecuador	294 kg
77 kg
Snatch	Andrés Caicedo; Colombia	156 kg	Junior Sánchez; Venezuela	155 kg	Addriel La O Garcia; Cuba	155 kg
Clean & Jerk	Andrés Caicedo; Colombia	191 kg	Yony Andica; Colombia	187 kg	Addriel La O Garcia; Cuba	185 kg
Total	Andrés Caicedo; Colombia	347 kg	Addriel La O Garcia; Cuba	340 kg	Junior Sánchez; Venezuela	330 kg
85 kg
Snatch	Zacarías Bonnat; Dominican Republic	153 kg	Pascal Plamondon; Canada	153 kg	Yoelmis Hernández; Cuba	152 kg
Clean & Jerk	Yoelmis Hernández; Cuba	190 kg	Olfides Sáez; Cuba	188 kg	Welisson Rosa da Silva; Brazil	188 kg
Total	Yoelmis Hernández; Cuba	342 kg	Olfides Sáez; Cuba	338 kg	Pascal Plamondon; Canada	338 kg
94 kg
Snatch	Kendrick Farris; United States	165 kg	Victor Quinones; Cuba	162 kg	David Samayoa; Canada	150 kg
Clean & Jerk	Kendrick Farris; United States	199 kg	Victor Quinones; Cuba	196 kg	Yeison Arias; Venezuela	195 kg
Total	Kendrick Farris; United States	364 kg	Victor Quinones; Cuba	358 kg	Yeison Arias; Venezuela	340 kg
105 kg
Snatch	Jorge Arroyo; Ecuador	180 kg	Jesús González; Venezuela	175 kg	Mateus Gregório; Brazil	170 kg
Clean & Jerk	Jesús González; Venezuela	210 kg	Donovan Ford; United States	207 kg	Hernan Viera; Peru	199 kg
Total	Jesús González; Venezuela	385 kg	Donovan Ford; United States	373 kg	Jorge Arroyo; Ecuador	373 kg
+105 kg
Snatch	Fernando Salas; Ecuador	180 kg	Caine Wilkes; United States	170 kg	Anderson Calero; Ecuador	167 kg
Clean & Jerk	Fernando Salas; Ecuador	220 kg	Caine Wilkes; United States	215 kg	José Familia; Dominican Republic	205 kg
Total	Fernando Salas; Ecuador	400 kg	Caine Wilkes; United States	385 kg	Anderson Calero; Ecuador	367 kg

=== Women ===
Event	Gold		Silver		Bronze	
48 kg
Snatch	Cándida Vásquez; Dominican Republic	83 kg	Ana Segura; Colombia	82 kg	Amanda Braddock; Canada	75 kg
Clean & Jerk	Ana Segura; Colombia	99 kg	Cándida Vásquez; Dominican Republic	98 kg	Kathleen Winters; United States	93 kg
Total	Ana Segura; Colombia	181 kg	Cándida Vásquez; Dominican Republic	181 kg	Kathleen Winters; United States	168 kg
53 kg
Snatch	Beatriz Pirón; Dominican Republic	91 kg	Morghan King; United States	85 kg	Ana Margot Lemos; Colombia	85 kg
Clean & Jerk	Ana Margot Lemos Robledo; Colombia	109 kg	Beatriz Pirón; Dominican Republic	108 kg	Yafreisy Silvestre; Dominican Republic	106 kg
Total	Beatriz Pirón; Dominican Republic	199 kg	Ana Margot Lemos; Colombia	194 kg	Morghan King; United States	185 kg
58 kg
Snatch	Yenny Álvarez; Colombia	100 kg	Lina Rivas; Colombia	99 kg	Yuderqui Contreras; Dominican Republic	97 kg
Clean & Jerk	Yenny Álvarez; Colombia	124 kg	Alexandra Escobar; Ecuador	119 kg	Lina Rivas; Colombia	119 kg
Total	Yenny Álvarez; Colombia	224 kg	Lina Rivas; Colombia	218 kg	Alexandra Escobar; Ecuador	215 kg
63 kg
Snatch	Mercedes Pérez; Colombia	105 kg	Eva Gurrola; Mexico	98 kg	Ana Duran; Mexico	93 kg
Clean & Jerk	Mercedes Pérez; Colombia	126 kg	Ana Duran; Mexico	125 kg	Eva Gurrola; Mexico	125 kg
Total	Mercedes Pérez; Colombia	231 kg	Eva Gurrola; Mexico	223 kg	Ana Duran; Mexico	218 kg
69 kg
Snatch	Leydi Solís; Colombia	107 kg	Martha Ann Rogers; United States	106 kg	Marie-Ève Beauchemin-Nadeau; Canada	103 kg
Clean & Jerk	Leydi Solís; Colombia	140 kg	Marie-Ève Beauchemin-Nadeau; Canada	134 kg	Martha Ann Rogers; United States	133 kg
Total	Leydi Solís; Colombia	247 kg	Martha Ann Rogers; United States	239 kg	Marie-Ève Beauchemin-Nadeau; Canada	237 kg
75 kg
Snatch	Ubaldina Valoyes; Colombia	108 kg	María Fernanda Valdés; Chile	107 kg	Jaqueline Ferreira; Brazil	105 kg
Clean & Jerk	María Fernanda Valdés; Chile	137 kg	Ubaldina Valoyes; Colombia	136 kg	Crismery Santana; Dominican Republic	131 kg
Total	María Fernanda Valdés; Chile	244 kg	Ubaldina Valoyes; Colombia	244 kg	Aremi Fuentes; Mexico	233 kg
+75 kg
Snatch	Tania Mascorro; Mexico	119 kg	Oliba Nieve; Ecuador	113 kg	Marissa Klingseis; United States	107 kg
Clean & Jerk	Tania Mascorro; Mexico	146 kg	Oliba Nieve; Ecuador	140 kg	Marissa Klingseis; United States	135 kg
Total	Tania Mascorro; Mexico	265 kg	Oliba Nieve; Ecuador	253 kg	Marissa Klingseis; United States	242 kg
