= Weightlifting at the 2013 Bolivarian Games =

- Dates: 17–20 November 2017
- Nations: 11

Weightlifting, for the 2013 Bolivarian Games, took place from 17 November to 20 November 2013. Colombia took 27 gold medals to win the event.

== Medal table ==
Key:

* Host nation (Peru)

Rank	Nation	Gold	Silver	Bronze	Total
1	Colombia (COL)	27	9	1	37
2	Ecuador (ECU)	10	11	11	32
3	Venezuela (VEN)	5	14	14	33
4	Chile (CHI)	0	4	6	10
5	El Salvador (ESA)	0	4	2	6
6	Peru (PER)*	0	0	4	4
7	Guatemala (GUA)	0	0	1	1
Totals (7 entries)		42	42	39	123

== Medal summary ==
- PR – Pan American record

=== Men ===
Event	Gold		Silver		Bronze	
56 kg Snatch	Sergio Rada (COL)	112 kg	Enmanuel Rocafuerte (ECU)	106 kg	Ramón Cruz (ESA)	103 kg
56 kg Clean & Jerk	Sergio Rada (COL)	140 kg	Enmanuel Rocafuerte (ECU)	138 kg	Francisco Barrera (CHI)	128 kg
56 kg Total	Sergio Rada (COL)	252 kg	Enmanuel Rocafuerte (ECU)	244 kg	Francisco Barrera (CHI)	230 kg
62 kg Snatch	Francisco Mosquera (COL)	127 kg	Erick Herrera (ECU)	119 kg	Ray López (VEN)	118 kg
62 kg Clean & Jerk	Francisco Mosquera (COL)	157 kg	Julio Salamanca Pineda (ESA)	156 kg	Erick Herrera (ECU)	150 kg
62 kg Total	Francisco Mosquera (COL)	284 kg	Erick Herrera (ECU)	269 kg	Julio Salamanca Pineda (ESA)	264 kg
69 kg Snatch	Junior Sánchez (VEN)	150 kg PR	Enrique Valencia (ECU)	135 kg	Oscar Valdizón (GUA)	125 kg
69 kg Clean & Jerk	Junior Sánchez (VEN)	175 kg	Enrique Valencia (ECU)	166 kg	Junior Lahuanampa (PER)	156 kg
69 kg Total	Junior Sánchez (VEN)	325 kg	Enrique Valencia (ECU)	301 kg	Junior Lahuanampa (PER)	276 kg
77 kg Snatch	Gabriel Mena (COL)	150 kg	Édison Angulo (COL)	141 kg	Raúl Sánchez (VEN)	140 kg
77 kg Clean & Jerk	Édison Angulo (COL)	187 kg	Gabriel Mena (COL)	178 kg	Raúl Sánchez (VEN)	160 kg
77 kg Total	Édison Angulo (COL)	328 kg	Gabriel Mena (COL)	328 kg	Raúl Sánchez (VEN)	300 kg
85 kg Snatch	Ferney Manzano (COL)	160 kg	Freddy Tenorio (ECU)	148 kg	Juan Ruiz (COL)	148 kg
85 kg Clean & Jerk	Juan Ruiz (COL)	194 kg	Ferney Manzano (COL)	193 kg	Freddy Tenorio (ECU)	181 kg
85 kg Total	Ferney Manzano (COL)	353 kg	Juan Ruiz (COL)	342 kg	Freddy Tenorio (ECU)	329 kg
94 kg Snatch	Eduardo Guadamud (ECU)	164 kg	Wilmer Torres (COL)	163 kg	Herbys Márquez (VEN)	156 kg
94 kg Clean & Jerk	Eduardo Guadamud (ECU)	203 kg	Wilmer Torres (COL)	202 kg	Hernán Viera (PER)	187 kg
94 kg Total	Eduardo Guadamud (ECU)	367 kg	Wilmer Torres (COL)	365 kg	Hernán Viera (PER)	329 kg
105 kg Snatch	Jorge Arroyo (ECU)	185 kg	Jesús González (VEN)	166 kg	Julio Luna (VEN)	157 kg
105 kg Clean & Jerk	Jorge Arroyo (ECU)	200 kg	Julio Luna (VEN)	194 kg	Jesús González (VEN)	192 kg
105 kg Total	Jorge Arroyo (ECU)	385 kg	Jesús González (VEN)	358 kg	Julio Luna (VEN)	351 kg

=== Women ===
Event	Gold		Silver		Bronze	
48 kg Snatch	Ana Segura (COL)	73 kg	Génesis Murcia (ESA)	70 kg	Jenniffer López (ECU)	66 kg
48 kg Clean & Jerk	Ana Segura (COL)	92 kg	Génesis Murcia (ESA)	88 kg	Jenniffer López (ECU)	85 kg
48 kg Total	Ana Segura (COL)	165 kg	Génesis Murcia (ESA)	158 kg	Jenniffer López (ECU)	151 kg
53 kg Snatch	Rusmeris Villar (COL)	85 kg	Gabriela Vera (CHI)	71 kg	Not awarded	n/a
53 kg Clean & Jerk	Rusmeris Villar (COL)	100 kg	Gabriela Vera (CHI)	91 kg	Not awarded	n/a
53 kg Total	Rusmeris Villar (COL)	185 kg	Gabriela Vera (CHI)	162 kg	Not awarded	n/a
58 kg Snatch	Jackelina Heredia (COL)	92 kg	Yusleidy Figueroa (VEN)	91 kg	Massiel Rojas (CHI)	80 kg
58 kg Clean & Jerk	Jackelina Heredia (COL)	125 kg	Yusleidy Figueroa (VEN)	118 kg	Massiel Rojas (CHI)	101 kg
58 kg Total	Jackelina Heredia (COL)	217 kg	Yusleidy Figueroa (VEN)	209 kg	Massiel Rojas (CHI)	181 kg
63 kg Snatch	Alexandra Escobar (ECU)	100 kg	Iriner Jiménez (VEN)	94 kg	Nidia Pardo (VEN)	90 kg
63 kg Clean & Jerk	Alexandra Escobar (ECU)	125 kg	Nidia Pardo (VEN)	121 kg	Iriner Jiménez (VEN)	119 kg
63 kg Total	Alexandra Escobar (ECU)	225 kg	Iriner Jiménez (VEN)	213 kg	Nidia Pardo (VEN)	211 kg
69 kg Snatch	Leydi Solís (COL)	106 kg	Mercedes Pérez (COL)	105 kg	Solenny Villasmil (VEN)	92 kg
69 kg Clean & Jerk	Leydi Solís (COL)	132 kg	Solenny Villasmil (VEN)	115 kg	Martha Malla (ECU)	115 kg
69 kg Total	Leydi Solís (COL)	238 kg	Solenny Villasmil (VEN)	207 kg	Martha Malla (ECU)	205 kg
75 kg Snatch	Ubaldina Valoyes (COL)	107 kg	Rosa Tenorio (ECU)	102 kg	Dayana Chirinos (VEN)	100 kg
75 kg Clean & Jerk	Ubaldina Valoyes (COL)	126 kg	María Valdez (CHI)	125 kg	Rosa Tenorio (ECU)	121 kg
75 kg Total	Ubaldina Valoyes (COL)	233 kg	Rosa Tenorio (ECU)	223 kg	María Valdez (CHI)	220 kg
+75 kg Snatch	Oliba Nieve (ECU)	113 kg	Yaniuska Espinoza (VEN)	113 kg	Naryury Pérez (VEN)	111 kg
+75 kg Clean & Jerk	Yaniuska Espinoza (VEN)	142 kg	Naryury Pérez (VEN)	141 kg	Oliba Nieve (ECU)	132 kg
+75 kg Total	Yaniuska Espinoza (VEN)	255 kg	Naryury Pérez (VEN)	252 kg	Oliba Nieve (ECU)	245 kg

== New records ==
The following records were established and improved upon during the competition.

Snatch 69 kg	150.0 kg	Junior Sánchez (VEN)	PR
