= 2010 Pan American Weightlifting Championships =

International weightlifting competition

2010 Pan American Championships
- Host city: Guatemala City, Guatemala
- Dates: May 26–30
- Main venue: Coliseo Deportivo Ciudad de los Deportes Juan José Arévalo Bermejo F.G.

The 2010 Pan American Weightlifting Championships were held at the Coliseo Deportivo Ciudad de los Deportes Juan José Arévalo Bermejo F.G. in Guatemala City, Guatemala. The event took place from May 26 to 30, 2010.

== Medal summary ==
=== Men ===
Event	Gold		Silver		Bronze	
56 kg
Snatch	Sergio Álvarez Boulet; Cuba	116 kg	Carlos Berna; Colombia	114 kg	Habib de las Salas; Colombia	113 kg
Clean & Jerk	Sergio Álvarez Boulet; Cuba	151 kg	Carlos Berna; Colombia	149 kg	José Montes; Mexico	148 kg
Total	Sergio Álvarez Boulet; Cuba	267 kg	Carlos Berna; Colombia	263 kg	José Montes; Mexico	256 kg
62 kg
Snatch	Diego Salazar; Colombia	133 kg	Lázaro Ruiz; Cuba	132 kg	Jesús López; Venezuela	125 kg
Clean & Jerk	Lázaro Ruiz; Cuba	166 kg	Diego Salazar; Colombia	162 kg	Jesús López; Venezuela	161 kg
Total	Lázaro Ruiz; Cuba	298 kg	Diego Salazar; Colombia	295 kg	Jesús López; Venezuela	286 kg
69 kg
Snatch	Edwin Mosquera; Colombia	142 kg	Junior Sánchez; Venezuela	140 kg	Bredni Roque; Cuba	137 kg
Clean & Jerk	Edwin Mosquera; Colombia	173 kg	Jesús López; Venezuela	170 kg	Francis Luna-Grenier; Canada	165 kg
Total	Edwin Mosquera; Colombia	315 kg	Bredni Roque; Cuba	307 kg	Junior Sánchez; Venezuela	300 kg
77 kg
Snatch	Yony Andica; Colombia	147 kg	Freddy Tenorio; Ecuador	147 kg	Iván Cambar; Cuba	141 kg
Clean & Jerk	Yony Andica; Colombia	183 kg	Freddy Tenorio; Ecuador	181 kg	Iván Cambar; Cuba	171 kg
Total	Yony Andica; Colombia	330 kg	Freddy Tenorio; Ecuador	328 kg	Iván Cambar; Cuba	312 kg
85 kg
Snatch	Kendrick Farris; United States	159 kg	Yoelmis Hernández; Cuba	158 kg	Carlos Andica; Colombia	158 kg
Clean & Jerk	Kendrick Farris; United States	203 kg	Yoelmis Hernández; Cuba	198 kg	Carlos Andica; Colombia	197 kg
Total	Kendrick Farris; United States	362 kg	Yoelmis Hernández; Cuba	356 kg	Carlos Andica; Colombia	355 kg
94 kg
Snatch	Javier Vanega; Cuba	170 kg	Wilmer Torres; Colombia	165 kg	Nicolas Roberts; Canada	151 kg
Clean & Jerk	Wilmer Torres; Colombia	211 kg	Javier Vanega; Cuba	206 kg	Nicolas Roberts; Canada	195 kg
Total	Wilmer Torres; Colombia	376 kg	Javier Vanega; Cuba	376 kg	Nicolas Roberts; Canada	346 kg
105 kg
Snatch	Jorge Arroyo; Ecuador	177 kg	Lázaro López; Cuba	173 kg	Cody Gibbs; United States	165 kg
Clean & Jerk	Lázaro López; Cuba	215 kg	Angel Daza; Venezuela	204 kg	Leonel Albarran; Venezuela	202 kg
Total	Lázaro López; Cuba	388 kg	Jorge Arroyo; Ecuador	377 kg	Donald Shankle; United States	358 kg
+105 kg
Snatch	Patrick Judge; United States	168 kg	Sertanis Teran; Cuba	167 kg	Julio Arteaga; Ecuador	167 kg
Clean & Jerk	Julio Arteaga; Ecuador	222 kg	Sertanis Teran; Cuba	211 kg	William Solís; Colombia	211 kg
Total	Julio Arteaga; Ecuador	389 kg	Sertanis Teran; Cuba	378 kg	Patrick Judge; United States	378 kg

=== Women ===
Event	Gold		Silver		Bronze	
48 kg
Snatch	Carolina Valencia; Mexico	74 kg	Carmen Echevarría; Puerto Rico	72 kg	Kelly Rexroad; United States	72 kg
Clean & Jerk	Carolina Valencia; Mexico	93 kg	Carmen Echevarría; Puerto Rico	91 kg	Guillermina Candelario; Dominican Republic	90 kg
Total	Carolina Valencia; Mexico	167 kg	Carmen Echevarría; Puerto Rico	163 kg	Guillermina Candelario; Dominican Republic	159 kg
53 kg
Snatch	Rusmeris Villar; Colombia	88 kg	Yineisy Reyes; Dominican Republic	80 kg	Inmara Henríquez; Venezuela	78 kg
Clean & Jerk	Rusmeris Villar; Colombia	113 kg	Inmara Henríquez; Venezuela	105 kg	Lely Burgos; Puerto Rico	97 kg
Total	Rusmeris Villar; Colombia	201 kg	Inmara Henríquez; Venezuela	183 kg	Lely Burgos; Puerto Rico	173 kg
58 kg
Snatch	Alexandra Escobar; Ecuador	97 kg	Lina Rivas; Colombia	96 kg	Yuderqui Contreras; Dominican Republic	96 kg
Clean & Jerk	Alexandra Escobar; Ecuador	125 kg	Jackelina Heredia; Colombia	120 kg	Yuderqui Contreras; Dominican Republic	120 kg
Total	Alexandra Escobar; Ecuador	222 kg	Yuderqui Contreras; Dominican Republic	216 kg	Lina Rivas; Colombia	211 kg
63 kg
Snatch	Nísida Palomeque; Colombia	100 kg	Mercedes Pérez; Colombia	95 kg	Luz Acosta; Mexico	92 kg
Clean & Jerk	Mercedes Pérez; Colombia	126 kg	Nísida Palomeque; Colombia	123 kg	Iriner Jiménez; Venezuela	118 kg
Total	Nísida Palomeque; Colombia	223 kg	Mercedes Pérez; Colombia	221 kg	Luz Acosta; Mexico	210 kg
69 kg
Snatch	Leydi Solís; Colombia	102 kg	Norma Figueroa; Puerto Rico	94 kg	Neriara Menezes; Brazil	88 kg
Clean & Jerk	Leydi Solís; Colombia	122 kg	Norma Figueroa; Puerto Rico	120 kg	Neriara Menezes; Brazil	112 kg
Total	Leydi Solís; Colombia	224 kg	Norma Figueroa; Puerto Rico	214 kg	Neriara Menezes; Brazil	200 kg
75 kg
Snatch	Ubaldina Valoyes; Colombia	110 kg	Cinthya Domínguez; Mexico	101 kg	Damaris Aguirre; Mexico	97 kg
Clean & Jerk	Ubaldina Valoyes; Colombia	133 kg	Cinthya Domínguez; Mexico	125 kg	Yarvanis Herrera; Venezuela	122 kg
Total	Ubaldina Valoyes; Colombia	243 kg	Cinthya Domínguez; Mexico	226 kg	Damaris Aguirre; Mexico	219 kg
+75 kg
Snatch	Oliba Nieve; Ecuador	118 kg	Sarah Robles; United States	106 kg	Yaniuska Espinosa; Venezuela	106 kg
Clean & Jerk	Oliba Nieve; Ecuador	142 kg	Sarah Robles; United States	133 kg	Yaniuska Espinosa; Venezuela	132 kg
Total	Oliba Nieve; Ecuador	260 kg	Sarah Robles; United States	239 kg	Yaniuska Espinosa; Venezuela	238 kg
