= 2017 Pan American Weightlifting Championships =

2017 Pan American Championships
- Host city: Miami, United States
- Dates: June 23 – 30
- Main venue: Miccosukee Resort

The 2017 Pan American Weightlifting Championships was held in Miami, United States between July 23 and July 30, 2017.

A total of 126 weightlifters qualified to compete at the 2019 Pan American Games through scores from both the 2017 and 2018 Pan American Championships combined. A nation may enter a maximum of 12 weightlifters (six per gender). The host nation (Peru) automatically qualified the maximum team size.

== Medal summary ==
Results are obtained from the IWF website.

=== Men ===
Event	Gold		Silver		Bronze	
56 kg
Snatch	Carlos Berna; Colombia	119 kg	Luis García; Dominican Republic	118 kg	Rafael Ferruzola; Ecuador	108 kg
Clean & Jerk	Carlos Berna; Colombia	151 kg	Luis García; Dominican Republic	150 kg	Rafael Ferruzola; Ecuador	135 kg
Total	Carlos Berna; Colombia	270 kg	Luis García; Dominican Republic	268 kg	Rafael Ferruzola; Ecuador	243 kg
62 kg
Snatch	Cristhian Zurita; Ecuador	125 kg	Dariel Villareal; Cuba	124 kg	Luis Fernando Higuita; Colombia	123 kg
Clean & Jerk	Antonio Vasquez; Mexico	161 kg	Luis Fernando Higuita; Colombia	158 kg	Roy López; Venezuela	154 kg
Total	Antonio Vasquez; Mexico	282 kg	Luis Fernando Higuita; Colombia	281 kg	Roy López; Venezuela	274 kg
69 kg
Snatch	Luis Javier Mosquera; Colombia	145 kg	Julio Mayora; Venezuela	143 kg	Jonathan Muñoz; Mexico	137 kg
Clean & Jerk	Luis Javier Mosquera; Colombia	180 kg	Julio Mayora; Venezuela	172 kg	Jonathan Muñoz; Mexico	171 kg
Total	Luis Javier Mosquera; Colombia	325 kg	Julio Mayora; Venezuela	315 kg	Jonathan Muñoz; Mexico	308 kg
77 kg
Snatch	Yeison López; Colombia	162 kg AM	Brayan Rodallegas; Colombia	152 kg	Junior Sánchez; Venezuela	151 kg
Clean & Jerk	Yeison López; Colombia	190 kg	Angelo Bianco III; United States	188 kg	Harrison Maurus; United States	186 kg
Total	Yeison López; Colombia	352 kg	Angelo Bianco III; United States	333 kg	Brayan Rodallegas; Colombia	331 kg
85 kg
Snatch	Jhor Moreno; Colombia	160 kg	Jhonatan Rivas; Colombia	159 kg	Yoelmis Hernandez; Cuba	158 kg
Clean & Jerk	Yoelmis Hernandez; Cuba	203 kg	Jhor Moreno; Colombia	200 kg	Keydomar Vallenilla; Venezuela	195 kg
Total	Yoelmis Hernandez; Cuba	361 kg	Jhor Moreno; Colombia	360 kg	Keydomar Vallenilla; Venezuela	351 kg
94 kg
Snatch	Colin Burns; United States	169 kg	Marco Machado; Brazil	166 kg	Victor Quiñones; Cuba	166 kg
Clean & Jerk	Jeyson Arias; Venezuela	200 kg	Colin Burns; United States	197 kg	Marco Machado; Brazil	195 kg
Total	Colin Burns; United States	366 kg	Marco Machado; Brazil	361 kg	Victor Quiñones; Cuba	357 kg
105 kg
Snatch	Jorge Arroyo; Ecuador	182 kg	Wesley Kitts; United States	175 kg	Juan Columbié; Cuba	167 kg
Clean & Jerk	D'Angelo Osorio; United States	210 kg	Juan Columbié; Cuba	206 kg	Hernan Viera; Peru	205 kg
Total	Jorge Arroyo; Ecuador	382 kg	Wesley Kitts; United States	375 kg	Juan Columbié; Cuba	373 kg
+105 kg^{[a]}
Snatch	Fernando Salas; Ecuador	178 kg	Mateus Machado; Brazil	176 kg	Caine Wilkes; United States	175 kg
Clean & Jerk	Caine Wilkes; United States	219 kg	Fernando Salas; Ecuador	215 kg	Luis Lauret; Cuba	205 kg
Total	Caine Wilkes; United States	394 kg	Fernando Salas; Ecuador	393 kg	Mateus Machado; Brazil	378 kg

^{a} Fernando Reis participated as an extra athlete and his results did not count for the competition. He lifted 198 kg in Snatch for a Pan American record. He also lifted 225 kg for Clean & Jerk and a Total of 423 kg

=== Women ===
Event	Gold		Silver		Bronze	
48 kg
Snatch	Ana Segura; Colombia	77 kg	Alyssa Lynn Ritchey; United States	77 kg	Kathleen Winters; United States	75 kg
Clean & Jerk	Ana Segura; Colombia	100 kg	Carolina Valencia; Mexico	98 kg	Amanda Braddock; Canada	96 kg
Total	Ana Segura; Colombia	177 kg	Carolina Valencia; Mexico	173 kg	Alyssa Lynn Ritchey; United States	172 kg
53 kg
Snatch	Rosane dos Reis; Brazil	88 kg	Leticia Laurindo; Brazil	86 kg	Caitlin Hogan; United States	86 kg
Clean & Jerk	Rusmeris Villar; Colombia	108 kg	Caitlin Hogan; United States	107 kg	Beatriz Pirón; Dominican Republic	106 kg
Total	Rosane dos Reis; Brazil	194 kg	Caitlin Hogan; United States	193 kg	Beatriz Pirón; Dominican Republic	191 kg
58 kg
Snatch	Maria Alexandra Escobar; Ecuador	94 kg	Monica Dominguez; Mexico	94 kg	María Lobón; Colombia	93 kg
Clean & Jerk	María Lobón; Colombia	117 kg	Maria Alexandra Escobar; Ecuador	117 kg	Yusleidy Figueroa; Venezuela	116 kg
Total	Maria Alexandra Escobar; Ecuador	211 kg	María Lobón; Colombia	210 kg	Monica Dominguez; Mexico	209 kg
63 kg
Snatch	Mercedes Pérez; Colombia	97 kg	Rosivé Silgado; Colombia	93 kg	Maude Charron; Canada	93 kg
Clean & Jerk	Rosivé Silgado; Colombia	125 kg	Mercedes Pérez; Colombia	124 kg	Ana Duran; Mexico	123 kg
Total	Mercedes Pérez; Colombia	221 kg	Rosivé Silgado; Colombia	218 kg	Maude Charron; Canada	215 kg
69 kg
Snatch	Leydi Solís; Colombia	107 kg	Martha Rogers; United States	100 kg	Angie Palacios; Ecuador	99 kg
Clean & Jerk	Leydi Solís; Colombia	134 kg	Martha Rogers; United States	133 kg	Anacarmen Torres; Mexico	126 kg
Total	Leydi Solís; Colombia	241 kg	Martha Rogers; United States	233 kg	Anacarmen Torres; Mexico	223 kg
75 kg
Snatch	Neisi Dájomes; Ecuador	110 kg	Monique Lima; Brazil	103 kg	Aremi Fuentes; Mexico	101 kg
Clean & Jerk	Neisi Dájomes; Ecuador	131 kg	Marie Beauchemin; Canada	130 kg	Dayana Chirinos; Venezuela	129 kg
Total	Neisi Dájomes; Ecuador	241 kg	Dayana Chirinos; Venezuela	230 kg	Aremi Fuentes; Mexico	228 kg
90 kg
Snatch	Crismery Santana; Dominican Republic	113 kg	Maria Valdes; Chile	111 kg	Oliba Nieve; Ecuador	111 kg
Clean & Jerk	Maria Valdes; Chile	142 kg	Crismery Santana; Dominican Republic	139 kg	Naryuri Perez; Venezuela	133 kg
Total	Maria Valdes; Chile	253 kg	Crismery Santana; Dominican Republic	252 kg	Oliba Nieve; Ecuador	243 kg
+90 kg
Snatch	Sarah Robles; United States	120 kg	Verónica Saladín; Dominican Republic	119 kg	Tania Mascorro; Mexico	118 kg
Clean & Jerk	Sarah Robles; United States	155 kg	Verónica Saladín; Dominican Republic	146 kg	Tania Mascorro; Mexico	142 kg
Total	Sarah Robles; United States	275 kg	Verónica Saladín; Dominican Republic	265 kg	Tania Mascorro; Mexico	260 kg
