= Weightlifting at the 2011 Pan American Games =

- Venue: Weightlifting Forum
- Dates: October 23 – October 27
- Competitors: 124 from 22 nations

Weightlifting competitions at the 2011 Pan American Games in Guadalajara were held from October 23 to October 27 at the Weightlifting Forum.

== Medal summary ==
=== Medal table ===
* Host nation (Mexico)

Rank	Nation	Gold	Silver	Bronze	Total
1	Cuba	4	0	0	4
2	Colombia	3	4	4	11
3	Ecuador	3	1	1	5
4	Venezuela	1	8	1	10
5	Canada	1	0	1	2
6	Brazil	1	0	0	1
6	Dominican Republic	1	0	0	1
6	Puerto Rico	1	0	0	1
9	Mexico*	0	1	5	6
10	Chile	0	1	0	1
11	United States	0	0	3	3
Totals (11 entries)		15	15	15	45

=== Men's events ===
Event	Gold	Silver	Bronze
56 kg	Sergio Álvarez; Cuba	Sergio Rada; Colombia	José Montes; Mexico
62 kg	Óscar Figueroa; Colombia	Jesús López; Venezuela	Diego Salazar; Colombia
69 kg	Israel Rubio; Venezuela	Junior Sanchez; Venezuela	Doyler Sánchez; Colombia
77 kg	Iván Cambar; Cuba	Ricardo Flores; Ecuador	Chad Vaughn; United States
85 kg	Yoelmis Hernández; Cuba	Carlos Andica; Colombia	Kendrick Farris; United States
94 kg	Javier Venega; Cuba	Herbys Márquez; Venezuela	Eduardo Guadamud; Ecuador
105 kg	Jorge Arroyo; Ecuador	Julio Luna; Venezuela	Donald Shankle; United States
+105 kg	Fernando Reis; Brazil	Yoel Morales; Venezuela	George Kobaladze; Canada

=== Women's events ===
Event	Gold	Silver	Bronze
48 kg	Lely Burgos; Puerto Rico	Betsi Rivas; Venezuela	Katherine Mercado; Colombia
53 kg	Yuderquis Contreras; Dominican Republic	Inmara Henriquez; Venezuela	Francia Peñuñuri; Mexico
58 kg	Maria Escobar; Ecuador	Jackelina Heredia; Colombia	Lina Rivas; Colombia
63 kg	Christine Girard; Canada	Nisida Palomeque; Colombia	Luz Acosta; Mexico
69 kg	Mercedes Pérez; Colombia	Cinthya Domínguez; Mexico	Aremi Fuentes; Mexico
75 kg	Ubaldina Valoyes; Colombia	Maria Valdes; Chile	Maria Alvarez; Venezuela
+75 kg	Olivia Nieve; Ecuador	Yaniuska Espinoza; Venezuela	Tania Mascorro; Mexico

== Schedule ==
All times are Central Standard time (UTC-6).

Day	Date	Start	Finish	Event	Phase
Day 10	Sunday, October 23	12:00	18:00	Men's 56/62 kg, Women 48 kg	Final
Day 11	Monday, October 24	12:00	18:00	Men's 69 kg, Women 53/58 kg	Final
Day 12	Tuesday, October 25	12:00	18:00	Men's 77/85 kg, Women 63 kg	Final
Day 13	Wednesday, October 26	12:00	18:00	Men's 94 kg, Women 69/75 kg	Final
Day 14	Thursday, October 27	12:00	18:00	Men's 105/+105 kg, Women +75 kg	Final

== Qualification ==
The top eighteen teams with the combined scores at the 2009 and 2010 Pan American Championship would qualify athletes, with the teams finishing higher, qualifying more athletes. Mexico as hosts enters a full team for each gender.

=== Qualification timeline ===
Event	Date	Venue
2009 Pan American Championship	June 3 to May 8, 2011	(United States) Chicago
2010 Pan American Championship	May 23 to May 31, 2011	Guatemala City

=== Summary ===
NOC	Men	Women	Total athletes
Argentina	2	2	4
Brazil	2	2	4
Canada	2	1	3
Chile		3	3
Colombia	7	6	13
Costa Rica	1		1
Cuba	7	2	9
Dominican Republic	5	6	11
Ecuador	6	5	11
El Salvador	2	1	3
Guatemala	4	2	6
Haiti	1		1
Honduras	1	1	2
Mexico	7	6	13
Nicaragua	1	1	2
Panama	1		1
Peru	1	2	3
Puerto Rico	4	6	10
United States	6	5	11
Uruguay	1		1
Venezuela	7	5	12
Total athletes	68	56	124
Total NOCs	19	17	21
