= Weightlifting at the 2015 Pan American Games =

- Weightlifting pictogram for the games
- Venue: Oshawa Sports Centre
- Dates: July 11–15
- No. of events: 15 (8 men, 7 women)
- Competitors: 121 from 24 nations

Weightlifting competitions at the 2015 Pan American Games in Toronto was held from July 11 to 15 at the General Motors Centre (Oshawa Sports Centre) in Oshawa. Due to naming rights the arena was as the latter for the duration of the games. A total of fifteen weightlifting events were held: eight for men and seven for women.

== Venue ==
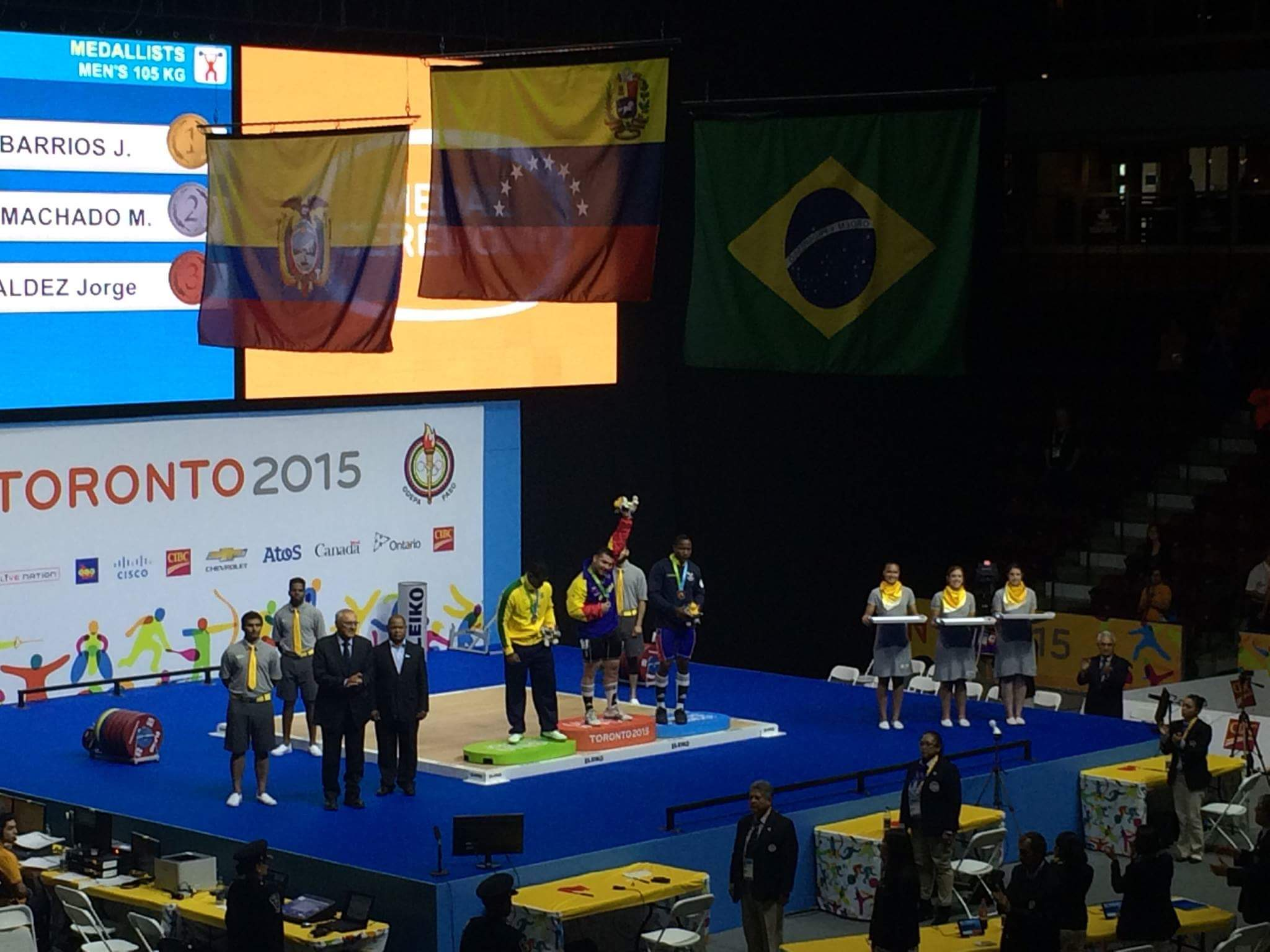
The General Motors Centre (Oshawa Sports Centre), in Oshawa, was the venue for the weightlifting competitions (pictured here during a medal ceremony)

The competitions took place at the General Motors Centre (Oshawa Sports Centre) located in the city of Oshawa, about 60 kilometers from the athletes village. The arena will had a reduced capacity of 3,000 people per session (about half its normal of 5,500). The venue also hosted the boxing competitions later in the games.

== Competition schedule ==
The following is the competition schedule for the weightlifting competitions:

F	Final

Event↓/Date →	Sat 11	Sun 12	Mon 13	Tue 14	Wed 15
Men's 56 kg	F				
Men's 62 kg	F				
Men's 69 kg		F			
Men's 77 kg			F		
Men's 85 kg			F		
Men's 94 kg				F	
Men's 105 kg					F
Men's +105 kg					F
Women's 48 kg	F				
Women's 53 kg		F			
Women's 58 kg		F			
Women's 63 kg			F		
Women's 69 kg				F	
Women's 75 kg				F	
Women's +75 kg					F

== Medal table ==
* Host nation (Canada)

Rank	Nation	Gold	Silver	Bronze	Total
1	Colombia	8	3	2	13
2	Venezuela	2	4	1	7
3	Cuba	2	2	1	5
4	Brazil	1	1	2	4
5	United States	1	1	0	2
6	Dominican Republic	1	0	3	4
7	Ecuador	0	1	3	4
8	Mexico	0	1	2	3
9	Canada*	0	1	1	2
10	Chile	0	1	0	1
Totals (10 entries)		15	15	15	45

== Medalists ==
=== Men's events ===
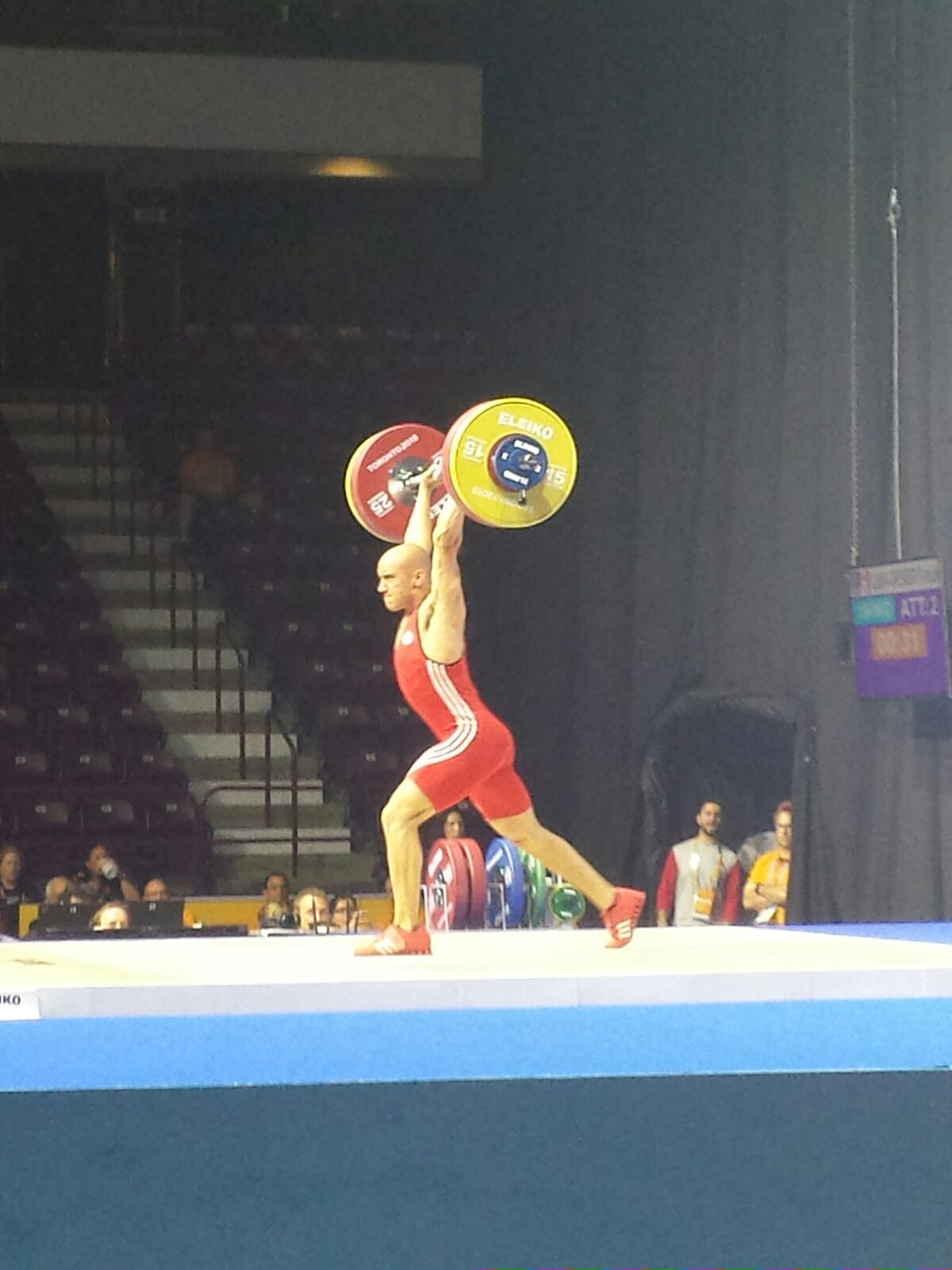
Francis Luna-Grenier lifts during the men's 69 kg weightlifting competition at the 2015 Pan American Games in Toronto

Event	Gold	Silver	Bronze
56 kg	Habib de las Salas; Colombia	Carlos Berna; Colombia	Luis García; Dominican Republic
62 kg	Óscar Figueroa; Colombia	Francisco Mosquera; Colombia	Jesús López; Venezuela
69 kg	Luis Javier Mosquera; Colombia	Bredni Roque; Mexico	Francis Luna-Grenier; Canada
77 kg	Addriel Garcia Lao; Cuba	Junior Sánchez; Venezuela	Jhor Moreno; Colombia
85 kg	Yoelmis Hernández; Cuba	Yadier Nuñez; Cuba	Juan Ruiz Morelos; Colombia
94 kg	Kendrick Farris; United States	Javier Vanega; Cuba	Herbys Márquez; Venezuela
105 kg	Jesús González; Venezuela	Mateus Gregorio Machado; Brazil	Jorge Arroyo; Ecuador
+105 kg	Fernando Reis; Brazil	George Kobaladze; Canada	Fernando Salas Manguis; Ecuador

=== Women's events ===
Event	Gold	Silver	Bronze
48 kg	Cándida Vásquez; Dominican Republic	Ana Segura; Colombia	Beatriz Pirón; Dominican Republic
53 kg	Rusmeris Villar; Colombia	Génesis Rodríguez; Venezuela	Yafreisy Silvestre; Dominican Republic
58 kg	Lina Rivas; Colombia	Yusleidy Figueroa; Venezuela	Quisia Guicho; Mexico
63 kg	Mercedes Pérez; Colombia	Marina Rodríguez; Cuba	Bruna Nascimento Piloto; Brazil
69 kg	Leydi Solís; Colombia	Neisi Dájomes; Ecuador	Aremi Fuentes; Mexico
75 kg	Ubaldina Valoyes; Colombia	Fernanda Valdés; Chile	Jaqueline Ferreira; Brazil
+75 kg	Yaniuska Espinosa; Venezuela	Naryury Perez; Venezuela	Oliba Nieve; Ecuador

== Participating nations ==
A total of 24 countries qualified athletes. The number of athletes a nation entered is in parentheses beside the name of the country.

- Argentina (2)
- Aruba (1)
- Barbados (1)
- Bolivia (1)
- Brazil (8)
- Canada (13)
- Chile (4)
- Colombia (13)
- Costa Rica (2)
- Cuba (8)
- Dominican Republic (10)
- Ecuador (9)
- El Salvador (2)
- Guatemala (4)
- Haiti (2)
- Honduras (1)
- Mexico (9)
- Nicaragua (2)
- Panama (2)
- Peru (4)
- Puerto Rico (2)
- United States (7)
- Uruguay (1)
- Venezuela (13)

== Qualification ==
A total of 125 weightlifters (69 male and 56 women) were able to qualify to compete at the games. Qualification was done at the 2013 and 2014 Pan American Championships, where nations had points assigned per athlete's finishing position. The totals of both Championships were added and quotas were then awarded to the top 20 men's teams and 18 women's teams. A further two wildcards (one for each gender) was awarded.

== See also ==
- Weightlifting at the 2016 Summer Olympics
