= Weightlifting at the 2014 Pan American Sports Festival =

The weightlifting competition at the 2014 Pan American Sports Festival was held in Mexico City. The tournament was held from 19–21 July at the Centro Nacional de Desarrollo de Talentos Deportivos y Alto Rendimiento.

== Medal summary ==
=== Men's events ===
Event	Gold		Silver		Bronze	
56 kg Snatch	Diego Soto (CHI)	105 kg	Edouard Joseph (HAI)	100 kg	Eduard Beris (VEN)	110 kg
56 kg Clean&Jerk	Eduard Beris (VEN)	126 kg	Diego Soto (CHI)	126 kg	Edouard Joseph (HAI)	115 kg
62 kg Snatch	Lázaro Ruiz (CUB)	120 kg	Julio Salamanca (ESA)	117 kg	José Montes (MEX)	117 kg
62 kg Clean&Jerk	Julio Salamanca (ESA)	155 kg	Lázaro Ruiz (CUB)	149 kg	José Montes (MEX)	149 kg
69 kg Snatch	Ediel Marquez (CUB)	130 kg	Luis Landro (PUR)	116 kg	Ender Blanco (VEN)	116 kg
69 kg Clean&Jerk	Ediel Marquez (CUB)	157 kg	Luis Landro (PUR)	155 kg	Ender Blanco (VEN)	155 kg
77 kg Snatch	Hugo Catalán (ARG)	134 kg	Martín Gaytán (MEX)	133 kg	Rafael Machado (BRA)	125 kg
77 kg Clean&Jerk	Martín Gaytán (MEX)	169 kg	Juan Peña Mejía (DOM)	169 kg	Hugo Catalán (ARG)	168 kg
85 kg Snatch	Yoelmis Hernández (CUB)	150 kg	Iván Cambar (CUB)	149 kg	Renzo Balza (VEN)	146 kg
85 kg Clean&Jerk	Yoelmis Hernández (CUB)	185 kg	Iván Cambar (CUB)	183 kg	Renzo Balza (VEN)	182 kg
94 kg Snatch	Javier Vanega (CUB)	163 kg	Jeison Vidal (COL)	157 kg	Hernan Viera (PER)	150 kg
94 kg Clean&Jerk	Javier Vanega (CUB)	187 kg	Douglas Santos (BRA)	186 kg	Hernan Viera (PER)	180 kg
105 kg Snatch	Filipe Mateus (BRA)	166 kg	Danilo Pirela (VEN)	154 kg	José Familia (DOM)	154 kg
105 kg Clean&Jerk	Filipe Mateus (BRA)	196 kg	José Familia (DOM)	196 kg	Jorge García (CHI)	185 kg
+105 kg Snatch	Freddy Renteria (COL)	155 kg	Luis Hoil (GUA)	150 kg	Miguel Rodríguez (MEX)	125 kg
+105 kg Clean&Jerk	Freddy Renteria (COL)	191 kg	Luis Hoil (GUA)	180 kg	Ulrich Hoek (ARU)	168 kg

=== Women's events ===
Event	Gold		Silver		Bronze	
48 kg Snatch	Georgina Silvestre (DOM)	75 kg	Cándida Vásquez (DOM)	69 kg	Betsi Rivas (VEN)	69 kg
48 kg Clean&Jerk	Betsi Rivas (VEN)	90 kg	Cándida Vásquez (DOM)	89 kg	Georgina Silvestre (DOM)	88 kg
53 kg Snatch	Rosane Santos (BRA)	84 kg	Génesis Rodríguez (VEN)	83 kg	Vanessa Quiñones (COL)	75 kg
53 kg Clean&Jerk	Génesis Rodríguez (VEN)	100 kg	Vanessa Quiñones (COL)	98 kg	Rosane Santos (BRA)	95 kg
58 kg Snatch	Yineisy Reyes (DOM)	91 kg	Yuderqui Contreras (DOM)	90 kg	Yaneth Sous (VEN)	88 kg
58 kg Clean&Jerk	Yuderqui Contreras (DOM)	107 kg	Yaneth Sous (VEN)	105 kg	Yineisy Reyes (DOM)	105 kg
63 kg Snatch	Jackelina Heredia (COL)	91 kg	Patricia Domínguez (MEX)	90 kg	Angie Cárdenas (PER)	79 kg
63 kg Clean&Jerk	Jackelina Heredia (COL)	110 kg	Patricia Domínguez (MEX)	105 kg	Silvia Artola (NCA)	102 kg
69 kg Snatch	Leydi Solís (COL)	95 kg	Aremi Fuentes (MEX)	92 kg	Liliane Menezes (BRA)	90 kg
69 kg Clean&Jerk	Leydi Solís (COL)	122 kg	Liliane Menezes (BRA)	116 kg	Aremi Fuentes (MEX)	115 kg
75 kg Snatch	Ubaldina Valoyes (COL)	102 kg	María Valdez (CHI)	98 kg	Jaqueline Ferreira (BRA)	95 kg
75 kg Clean&Jerk	Ubaldina Valoyes (COL)	126 kg	Jaqueline Ferreira (BRA)	122 kg	María Valdez (CHI)	122 kg
+75 kg Snatch	Tania Mascorro (MEX)	100 kg	Astrid Camposeco (GUA)	87 kg	Silvia Aillapan (CHI)	86 kg
+75 kg Clean&Jerk	Tania Mascorro (MEX)	120 kg	Astrid Camposeco (GUA)	113 kg	Silvia Aillapan (CHI)	103 kg

== Medal table ==
* Host nation (Mexico)

Rank	Nation	Gold	Silver	Bronze	Total
1	Colombia (COL)	8	2	1	11
2	Cuba (CUB)	7	3	0	10
3	Dominican Republic (DOM)	3	5	3	11
4	Mexico (MEX)*	3	4	4	11
5	Venezuela (VEN)	3	3	7	13
6	Brazil (BRA)	3	3	4	10
7	Chile (CHI)	1	2	4	7
8	El Salvador (ESA)	1	1	0	2
9	Argentina (ARG)	1	0	1	2
10	Guatemala (GUA)	0	4	0	4
11	Puerto Rico (PUR)	0	2	0	2
12	Haiti (HAI)	0	1	1	2
13	Peru (PER)	0	0	3	3
14	Aruba (ARU)	0	0	1	1
14	Nicaragua (NCA)	0	0	1	1
Totals (15 entries)		30	30	30	90
