= Weightlifting at the 2010 South American Games – Women's 69kg =

The Women's 69 kg event at the 2010 South American Games was held over March 28 at 16:00.

== Medalists ==
Gold	Silver	Bronze
Leydi Solís; Colombia	Jaqueline Ferreira; Brazil	Belen Martinez; Argentina

== Results ==
Rank	Athlete	Bodyweight	Snatch			Clean & Jerk			Total
Rank	Athlete	Bodyweight	1	2	3	1	2	3	Total
1st place, gold medalist(s)	Leydi Solís (COL)	67.85	104	108	110	130	135	138	248
2nd place, silver medalist(s)	Jaqueline Ferreira (BRA)	67.97	90	~~93~~	~~93~~	~~110~~	~~110~~	110	200
3rd place, bronze medalist(s)	Belen Martinez (ARG)	67.17	82	~~86~~	~~86~~	105	~~111~~	111	193
4	Martha Lourdes Heras (ECU)	64.04	~~82~~	82	86	106	~~110~~	~~110~~	192
5	Angie Nicole Vega (CHI)	68.30	82	~~87~~	87	105	~~110~~	~~110~~	192
	Dayana Chirinos (VEN)	68.36	~~93~~	~~93~~	~~93~~	–	–	–	DNF

== New Records ==
Snatch	104 kg	Leydi Solís (COL)	GR
Snatch	108 kg	Leydi Solís (COL)	GR
Snatch	110 kg	Leydi Solís (COL)	GR
Clean & Jerk	130 kg	Leydi Solís (COL)	GR
Clean & Jerk	135 kg	Leydi Solís (COL)	GR
Clean & Jerk	138 kg	Leydi Solís (COL)	GR
Total	248 kg	Leydi Solís (COL)	GR
