= 2008 Pan American Weightlifting Championships =

International sporting event

The 2008 Pan American Weightlifting Championships were held in Callao, Peru from 19 March to 23 March 2008.

== Men's events ==
| Event | Gold | Silver | Bronze |
| 56 kg | (El Salvador) Marvin López 109 kg + 132 kg = 241 kg | (El Salvador) Julio Salamanca 104 kg + 125 kg = 229 kg | (Chile) Diego Soto 97 kg + 122 kg = 219 kg |
| 62 kg | (Colombia) Oscar Figueroa 137 kg + 167 kg = 304 kg | (Colombia) Diego Salazar 137 kg + 165 kg = 302 kg | (Cuba) Lazaro Ruiz 124 kg + 160 kg = 284 kg |
| 69 kg | (Colombia) Edwin Mosquera 142 kg + 173 kg = 315 kg | (Colombia) Luis Pineda 134 kg + 172 kg = 306 kg | (Venezuela) Raúl Sánchez 141 kg + 163 kg = 304 kg |
| 77 kg | (Venezuela) José Ocando 150 kg + 192 kg = 342 kg | (Cuba) Iván Cambar 150 kg + 191 kg = 341 kg | (Colombia) Gabriel Mena 145 kg + 180 kg = 325 kg |
| 85 kg | (Venezuela) Herbys Márquez 156 kg + 198 kg = 354 kg | (Cuba) Jadier Valladares 152 kg + 197 kg = 349 kg | (Colombia) Héctor Ballesteros 153 kg + 195 kg = 348 kg |
| 94 kg | (Cuba) Yoandry Hernández 167 kg + 210 kg = 377 kg | (Ecuador) Eduardo Guadamud 165 kg + 190 kg = 355 kg | (United States) Jeffrey Wittmer 155 kg + 192 kg = 347 kg |
| 105 kg | (Brazil) Bruno Laport Brandão 160 kg + 185 kg = 345 kg | (Canada) Akos Sandor 150 kg + 193 kg = 343 kg | (Ecuador) Boris Burov 161 kg + 180 kg = 341 kg |
| + 105 kg | (United States) Casey Burgener 170 kg + 210 kg = 380 kg | (Venezuela) Victor Heredia 166 kg + 210 kg = 376 kg | (Ecuador) Julio Arteaga 165 kg + 210 kg = 375 kg |

== Women's events ==
| Event | Gold | Silver | Bronze |
| 48 kg | (Venezuela) Betsi Rivas 70 kg + 92 kg = 162 kg | (Puerto Rico) Lely Burgos 69 kg + 91 kg = 160 kg | (Nicaragua) Karla Moreno 62 kg + 81 kg = 143 kg |
| 53 kg | (Dominican Republic) Yuderqui Contreras 88 kg + 110 kg = 198 kg | (Colombia) Ana Margot Lemos 88 kg + 106 kg = 194 kg | (Colombia) Jackelina Heredia 80 kg + 100 kg = 180 kg |
| 58 kg | (Ecuador) Alexandra Escobar 92 kg + 118 kg = 210 kg | (Puerto Rico) Geralee Vega 90 kg + 118 kg = 208 kg | (Colombia) Rusmeris Villar 85 kg + 111 kg = 196 kg |
| 63 kg | (Colombia) Mercedes Pérez 96 kg + 122 kg = 218 kg | (Venezuela) Solenny Villasmil 96 kg + 120 kg = 216 kg | (Venezuela) Iriner Jimenez 90 kg + 121 kg = 211 kg |
| 69 kg | (Colombia) Leydi Solís 95 kg + 127 kg = 222 kg | (Puerto Rico) Noemi Rivera 85 kg + 104 kg = 189 kg | (Brazil) Jaqueline Antonia Ferreira 85 kg + 103 kg = 188 kg |
| 75 kg | (Canada) Jean Elisabeth Lassen 103 kg + 134 kg = 237 kg | (Colombia) Ubaldina Valoyes 100 kg + 133 kg = 233 kg | (Dominican Republic) Natividad Domínguez 87 kg + 118 kg = 205 kg |
| + 75 kg | (Ecuador) Seledina Nieves 107 kg + 140 kg = 247 kg | (El Salvador) Eva Dimas 106 kg + 126 kg = 232 kg | (Dominican Republic) Yinely Burgos 96 kg + 127 kg = 223 kg |

== Medal table ==
| Rank | Nation | Gold | Silver | Bronze | Total |
|---|---|---|---|---|---|
| 1 | Colombia (COL) | 4 | 4 | 4 | 12 |
| 2 | Venezuela (VEN) | 3 | 2 | 2 | 7 |
| 3 | Ecuador (ECU) | 2 | 1 | 2 | 5 |
| 4 | Cuba (CUB) | 1 | 2 | 1 | 4 |
| Totals (4 entries) | | 10 | 9 | 9 | 28 |

== Notes and references ==
- Results
