= Lázaro Ruiz =

Cuban weightlifter (born 1984)

Personal information
- Born: October 12, 1984 (age 41)
Medal record
Men's Weightlifting
Representing Cuba
Pan American Championships
Gold medal – first place	2010 Guatemala City	– 62 kg
Bronze medal – third place	2008 Callao	– 62 kg
Pan American Sports Festival
Gold medal – first place	2014 Mexico	– 62 kg Snatch
Silver medal – second place	2014 Mexico	– 62 kg C&J

Lázaro Maikel Ruiz (born October 12, 1984) is a Cuban weightlifter.

At the 2008 Pan American Weightlifting Championships he won bronze in the 62 kg category, lifting a total of 284 kg.

He competed in Weightlifting at the 2008 Summer Olympics in the 62 kg division finishing sixth, with 294 kg, beating his previous personal best by 10 kg.

Ruiz won the – 62 gold medal in snatch and silver clean & jerk during the 2014 Pan American Sports Festival.
