= Ubaldina =

Ubaldina may refer to:

- Ubaldina Valoyes (born 1982), Colombian weightlifter
- 42614 Ubaldina, a main-belt minor planet
