= Kyle Pierce =

Kyle Pierce may refer to:

- Kyle Pierce (kinesiologist), professor of kinesiology
- Kyle Pierce (politician), member of the Indiana House of Representatives
- Kyle Pierce, pianist with the New Orleans Rhythm Kings
