= Weightlifting at the 2010 South American Games – Women's 48kg =

The Women's 48 kg event at the 2010 South American Games was held over March 26 at 14:00.

== Medalists ==
Gold	Silver	Bronze
Betsi Rivas; Venezuela	María Vásquez; Ecuador	Aline Campeiro; Brazil

== Results ==
Rank	Athlete	Bodyweight	Snatch			Clean & Jerk			Total
Rank	Athlete	Bodyweight	1	2	3	1	2	3	Total
1st place, gold medalist(s)	Betsi Rivas (VEN)	47.75	66	70	~~72~~	87	93	~~97~~	163
2nd place, silver medalist(s)	María Vásquez (ECU)	47.88	62	~~65~~	65	80	83	~~88~~	148
3rd place, bronze medalist(s)	Aline Campeiro (BRA)	47.96	62	~~65~~	65	80	~~83~~	~~84~~	145
4	Fiorela Chumacero (PER)	46.89	55	~~60~~	60	75	~~80~~	~~80~~	135
	Gabriela Montesinos (PER)	46.96	55	~~60~~	60	~~75~~	~~75~~	~~75~~	DNF

== New Records ==
Clean & Jerk	93 kg	Betsi Rivas (VEN)	GR
Total	163 kg	Betsi Rivas (VEN)	GR
