= Edwin Mosquera =

Edwin Mosquera may refer to:

- Edwin Mosquera (weightlifter) (1985–2017), Colombian weightlifter
- Edwin Mosquera (footballer) (born 2001), Colombian footballer
