= Iván Cambar =

Cuban weightlifter (born 1983)

Personal information
- Full name: Iván Cambar Rodriguez
- Nickname: El Cachorro
- Born: December 29, 1983 (age 42) Granma, Cuba
- Height: 1.63 m (5 ft 4 in) (2012)
- Weight: 77 kg (170 lb) (2012)

Sport
- Country: Cuba
- Sport: Weightlifting
- Event: -77 kg
Medal record
Olympic Games
Bronze medal – third place	2012 London	77 kg
Pan American Games
Gold medal – first place	2007 Rio de Janeiro	– 77 kg
Gold medal – first place	2011 Guadalajara	– 77 kg
Pan American Championships
Silver medal – second place	2008 Callao	– 77 kg
Bronze medal – third place	2010 Guatemala City	– 77 kg
Pan American Sports Festival
Silver medal – second place	2014 Mexico	– 85 kg Snatch
Silver medal – second place	2014 Mexico	– 85 kg C&J
Central American and Caribbean Games
Silver medal – second place	2006 Cartagena	– 77 kg
- Updated on 4 August 2012

Iván Cambar (born December 29, 1983) is a Cuban weightlifter.

At the 2006 World Championships he ranked 7th in the 77 kg category, with a total of 343 kg.

He won the gold medal for Cuba at the 15th Pan American Games in the 77 kg category on July 17, 2007, with a total lift of 350 kg. He lifted 156 kg in the snatch, beating the previous Pan American Games record. On his record Cambar said; "More than happiness for winning, I'm proud to set up a new Pan American record. It's really a great feeling and an honor to any athlete."

He then went on to lift 194 kg in the clean and jerk to win in Rio de Janeiro. He said of his gold medal "I came to the Pan Am Games as a favorite and, since the beginning, I felt a hard pressure. I knew it would have been a big disappointment in my country if I went back without a medal. Now I can go back home relaxed and I'm proud of my gold medal." José Ocando of Venezuela took silver with a combined lift 13 kg less than Cambar.

A year later in 2008, he competed in Weightlifting at the 2008 Summer Olympics in the 77 kg division finishing sixth with 353 kg. This beat his previous personal best by 10 kg.

He won the bronze medal at the 2012 Summer Olympics in the men's 77 kg category with a total of 349 kg.

Cambar won the 85 kg silver medals in snatch and clean & jerk during the 2014 Pan American Sports Festival.

He is 5 ft 4 inches tall and weighs 170 lb.
