= Caine Wilkes =

American weightlifter (born 1987)

Personal information
- Full name: Caine Morgan Wilkes
- Born: July 10, 1987 (age 39) Chesapeake, Virginia, U.S.

Sport
- Country: United States
- Sport: Weightlifting
- Weight class: +109 kg
Medal record
Men's weightlifting
Representing the United States
Pan American Championships
Gold medal – first place	2014 Santo Domingo	+105 kg
Gold medal – first place	2017 Miami	+105 kg
Gold medal – first place	2019 Guatemala City	+109 kg
Silver medal – second place	2016 Cartagena	+105 kg
Silver medal – second place	2018 Santo Domingo	+105 kg
Silver medal – second place	2020 Santo Domingo	+109 kg
Silver medal – second place	2023 Bariloche	+109 kg

Caine Morgan Wilkes (born July 10, 1987) is an American weightlifter. He is a three-time gold medalist in his event at the Pan American Weightlifting Championships. He also won the silver medal on four occasions. Wilkes represented the United States at the 2020 Summer Olympics in Tokyo, Japan.

== Career ==
Wilkes competed in the men's +105 kg event at the World Weightlifting Championships in 2013, 2014 and 2015. He competed in the men's +109 kg event in 2018 and 2019.

Wilkes represented the United States at the 2020 Summer Olympics in Tokyo, Japan. He competed in the men's +109 kg event. Wilkes lifted 173 kg in the Snatch and 217 kg in the Clean & Jerk for a total of 390 kg. He finished in 9th place.

He finished in 4th place in the men's +109 kg event at the 2022 Pan American Weightlifting Championships held in Bogotá, Colombia. He won the bronze medal in the men's +109 kg Clean & Jerk event.

Wilkes won the silver medal in his event at the 2023 Pan American Weightlifting Championships held in Bariloche, Argentina. In the same year, he competed in the men's +109 kg event at the World Weightlifting Championships held in Riyadh, Saudi Arabia.

== Achievements ==
Year	Venue	Weight	Snatch (kg)				Clean & Jerk (kg)				Total	Rank
Year	Venue	Weight	1	2	3	Rank	1	2	3	Rank	Total	Rank
Summer Olympics
2021	Tokyo, Japan	+109 kg	173	~~178~~	~~180~~	—N/a	212	217	~~224~~	—N/a	390	9
Pan American Championships
2014	Santo Domingo, Dominican Republic	+105 kg	170	178	~~183~~	3rd place, bronze medalist(s)	210	218	221	1st place, gold medalist(s)	399	1st place, gold medalist(s)
2016	Cartagena, Colombia	+105 kg	170	~~177~~	~~177~~	2nd place, silver medalist(s)	~~215~~	215	~~236~~	2nd place, silver medalist(s)	385	2nd place, silver medalist(s)
2017	Miami, United States	+105 kg	170	175	~~178~~	3rd place, bronze medalist(s)	209	215	219	1st place, gold medalist(s)	394	1st place, gold medalist(s)
2018	Santo Domingo, Dominican Republic	+105 kg	173	178	183	2nd place, silver medalist(s)	210	219	~~225~~	2nd place, silver medalist(s)	402	2nd place, silver medalist(s)
2019	Guatemala City, Guatemala	+109 kg	175	~~182~~	182	2nd place, silver medalist(s)	~~212~~	213	219	1st place, gold medalist(s)	401	1st place, gold medalist(s)
2020	Santo Domingo, Dominican Republic	+109 kg	170	~~175~~	176	2nd place, silver medalist(s)	205	212	~~219~~	2nd place, silver medalist(s)	388	2nd place, silver medalist(s)
2022	Bogotá, Colombia	+109 kg	168	~~173~~	~~174~~	5	205	~~210~~	~~211~~	3rd place, bronze medalist(s)	373	4
2023	Bariloche, Argentina	+109 kg	162	167	172	3rd place, bronze medalist(s)	195	203	212	1st place, gold medalist(s)	384	2nd place, silver medalist(s)
