= Beatriz Pirón =

Dominican Republic weightlifter (born 1995)

Personal information
- Full name: Beatriz Elizabeth Pirón Candelario
- Nationality: Dominican
- Born: February 27, 1995 (age 31) San Pedro de Macorís
- Height: 1.50 m (4 ft 11 in)
- Weight: 53 kg (117 lb)

Sport
- Country: Dominican Republic
- Sport: Weightlifting
- Event: –48 kg
- Coached by: Leonild Goncharenko, Rómula Hidalgo, Bienvenido Rodríguez
Medal record
Women's weightlifting
Representing the Dominican Republic
Pan American Championships
Gold medal – first place	2025 Cali	53 kg
Pan American Games
Gold medal – first place	2019 Lima	–49 kg
Bronze medal – third place	2015 Toronto	–48 kg
Bronze medal – third place	2023 Santiago	–49 kg
Central American and Caribbean Games
Gold medal – first place	2014 Veracruz	–48 kg Snatch
Gold medal – first place	2023 San Salvador	–48 kg Snatch
Silver medal – second place	2014 Veracruz	–48 kg C&J
Silver medal – second place	2018 Barranquilla	–53 kg C&J
Bronze medal – third place	2023 San Salvador	–48 kg C&J
Junior Pan American Championships
Gold medal – first place	2015 Cartagena	–48 kg Snatch
Gold medal – first place	2015 Cartagena	–48 kg C&J
Gold medal – first place	2015 Cartagena	–48 kg Total
Youth Pan American Championships
Gold medal – first place	2011 Isla Margarita	– 44 kg

Beatriz Elizabeth Pirón Candelario (born February 27, 1995) is a retired Dominican weightlifter. She won the bronze medal in snatch at the 2011 Youth World Championships and gold at the 2011 Youth Pan American Championships. As of 2026, she is the only Dominican woman to have attended four Olympic Games.

She was among the participants of the 2026 Enhanced Games. At the Enhanced Breakers 1 series, as an enhanced athlete, she broke the 53 kg snatch record by lifting 100 kg.

== Personal life ==
Born Beatriz Elizabeth Pirón Candelario on February 27, 1995, in San Pedro de Macorís, she is 150 cm (4 ft 11 in) tall 48 kilograms (106 lb). Her parents are Kenia Candelario and Augusto Pirón, have a daughter named Yamilka and Berlyn is the niece of the three times Pan American Games medalist Guillermina Candelario. She is a member of the Dominican Republic National Police and she had her rank lifted to second lieutenant at the time she completed her bachelor's degree in accounting.

== Career ==
=== 2009 ===
Pirón ranked 5th at 1st Youth World championships held in Chiang Mai, Thailand, participating in the under 44 kg, having a 54 kg lift in snatch, 64 kg in clean & jerk and a total of 118 kg.

=== 2011 ===
In April Pirón won three gold medals in the 2011 Youth Pan American Championship in the under 44 kg, setting two continental records in snatch with 62 kg and total 128 kg; she also lifted 76 kg in clean & jerk. She participated under the guidance of the coaches Rómula Hidalgo, Bienvenido Rodríguez. In May, she won the bronze medal in snatch with a 60 kg lift in snatch in the 44 kg division of the 2011 Youth World Championships held in Lima, Peru. She also had 76 in clean&jerk and a total of 136 kg. She was crowned in July in the National Junior Championship winning the gold medal in snatch with 80 kg and total with 146 kilograms, also winning the silver medal in clean & jerk with 66.

The San Pedro de Macorís Hall of Fame invited Pirón in September to be one the pageant on the memorial where Tony Fernández and Tetelo Vargas were among the inductees.

=== 2012 ===
With a 6th place at the Pan-American Championship held in Antigua, Guatemala Pirón started the 2012 competing in the under 48 kg category with a total lifted of 158 kg. She earned the gold medal lifting 65 kg in snatch, 85 kg in clean & jerk and 150 kg in total in the National Schools Games representing the East region.

She was named along Yuderqui Contreras to represent the Dominican Republic at the London Olympic Games, practicing under the Guidance of Leonild Goncharenko. In her first Olympic, she ranked 7th in snatch and finished in 9th place at the 48 kg category of the Olympic tournament, with 90 kg in clean & jerk and 167 kg in total.

=== 2015–2016 ===
Pirón competed in 2015 Pan American Games and won the bronze medal being her National Police ranking being lifted to Corporal because of her medal. She won three gold medals in the 48 kg category, setting new Pan American marks with 81 kg in snatch, 97 kg in clean & jerk and a total amount of 178 kg. Pirón won two gold medals in snatch and total and a silver in clean and jerk, participating in the 53 kg category of the 2016 Pan American Championships. She took part of the 2016 Summer Olympics in Rio de Janeiro, finishing in the fourth place in the 48 kg category lifting 85 kg in snatch, 102 kg in clean and jerk and a total of 187 kg, just one kilo under the bronze medal.

=== 2021 ===
She represented the Dominican Republic at the 2020 Summer Olympics in Tokyo, Japan. She finished in 8th place in the women's 49 kg event.

=== 2023 ===
She won the bronze medal in the women's 49 kg event at the 2023 Pan American Games held in Santiago, Chile.

=== 2024 ===
In August 2024, Pirón competed in the women's 49 kg event at the 2024 Summer Olympics held in Paris, France. She lifted 85 kg in Snatch and 107 kg in Clean & Jerk setting 192 kg in total placing seventh in her forth Olympic Games.

=== 2025-2026 ===
Pirón announced her retirement at the end of 2025, thanking with an emotional letter in social media to her family and institutions who helped her throughout her career and being the only four times Olympian Dominican woman.

In 2026, she competed in the first edition of the Enhanced Games, participating in the 53 kg category, she lifted 118 kg in the clean and jerk, the world record being 126 kg, and failed three times in snatch with 100 kg trying to break the world record of 99 kg. Even though, there were already reports that she had broken the record during training. During an interview before the games, she justified that she had to scale up from 49 kg to the 53 category in order to achieve the strength and muscle mass to pursue the world record and that she was training with the help of substance that would be doping within the Olympic Sport.

On 11 July 2026, Piron participated at the Enhanced Breakers 1 series where she broke the 53 kg snatch record by lifting 100 kg. It was disclosed that she could not complete this lift during the first edition of the Enhanced Games because she was injured and spent six weeks of a personalized enhancement and recovery protocol that allow her to quickly heal and break the record, that she did in front of a large group of creators in order to help spread the news.

== Achievements ==
Year	Venue	Weight	Snatch (kg)				Clean & Jerk (kg)				Total	Rank
Year	Venue	Weight	1	2	3	Rank	1	2	3	Rank	Total	Rank
Summer Olympics
2012	(United Kingdom) London, Great Britain	48 kg	72	75	77	—N/a	87	90	~~92~~	—N/a	167	9
2016	Rio de Janeiro, Brazil	48 kg	85	~~87~~	~~87~~	—N/a	102	~~105~~	~~105~~	—N/a	187	4
2021	Tokyo, Japan	49 kg	78	81	~~83~~	—N/a	90	93	95	—N/a	176	8
2024	Paris, France	49 kg	85	~~88~~	~~88~~	—N/a	102	107	~~110~~	—N/a	192	7
World Championships
2015	Houston, United States	48 kg	~~80~~	80	~~83~~	11	95	98	100	13	180	11
2018	Ashgabat, Turkmenistan	49 kg	81	~~84~~	84	3rd place, bronze medalist(s)	100	103	~~105~~	5	187	4
2019	Pattaya, Thailand	49 kg	83	86	~~88~~	6	101	~~103~~	~~103~~	9	187	7
2023	Riyadh, Saudi Arabia	49 kg	—	—	—	—	—	—	—	—	—	—
IWF World Cup
2019	Fuzhou, China	49 kg	~~75~~	~~78~~	78	3rd place, bronze medalist(s)	90	94	98	5	176	3rd place, bronze medalist(s)
2024	Phuket, Thailand	49 kg	—	—	—	—	—	—	—	—	—	—
Pan American Games
2015	Toronto, Canada	48 kg	80	~~84~~	~~84~~	—N/a	95	~~98~~	~~99~~	—N/a	175	3rd place, bronze medalist(s)
2019	Lima, Peru	49 kg	82	85	87	—N/a	100	104	106	—N/a	193	1st place, gold medalist(s)
2023	Santiago, Chile	49 kg	80	84	~~86~~	—N/a	97	~~102~~	~~102~~	—N/a	181	3rd place, bronze medalist(s)
Pan American Championships
2012	Antigua Guatemala, Guatemala	48 kg	68	~~71~~	71	4	84	87	~~88~~	5	158	6
2013	Margarita Island, Venezuela	48 kg	77	80	~~82~~	1st place, gold medalist(s)	91	96	~~98~~	2nd place, silver medalist(s)	176	1st place, gold medalist(s)
2016	(Venezuela) Cartagena, Colombia	53 kg	87	90	91	1st place, gold medalist(s)	105	108	~~111~~	2nd place, silver medalist(s)	199	1st place, gold medalist(s)
2017	Miami, United States	53 kg	85	~~88~~	~~88~~	4	104	106	~~108~~	3rd place, bronze medalist(s)	191	3rd place, bronze medalist(s)
2018	Santo Domingo, Dominican Republic	53 kg	88	90	~~92~~	1st place, gold medalist(s)	106	~~109~~	~~110~~	4	196	1st place, gold medalist(s)
2019	Guatemala City, Guatemala	49 kg	82	~~85~~	~~85~~	2nd place, silver medalist(s)	99	~~102~~	102	3rd place, bronze medalist(s)	184	2nd place, silver medalist(s)
2021	Guayaquil, Ecuador	49 kg	78	~~81~~	~~82~~	4	91	96	~~98~~	5	174	5
2022	Bogotá, Colombia	49 kg	~~82~~	~~82~~	82	5	97	102	~~105~~	5	184	5
2024	Caracas, Venezuela	49 kg	—	—	—	—	—	—	—	—	—	—
2025	Cali, Colombia	53 kg	88	91	~~94~~	1st place, gold medalist(s)	107	110	~~112~~	3rd place, bronze medalist(s)	201	1st place, gold medalist(s)
