= Astrid Camposeco =

Guatemalan weightlifter

Personal information
- Born: 27 April 1991 (age 34); Quetzaltenango, Guatemala

Sport
- Sport: Weightlifting

Astrid Roxana Camposeco Hernández (born 27 April 1991) is a Guatemalan weightlifter. She competed for Guatemala at the 2012 Summer Olympics. She won the – 75 kg silver medals in snatch and clean & jerk during the 2014 Pan American Sports Festival.

== Doping ==
Camposeco was disqualified during the 2015 Pan American Games when she was found to have Clenbuterol and boldenone in her system from a test performed May 23 and results published on July 9.
