= Betsi Rivas =

Venezuelan weightlifter (born 1986)

Personal information
- Born: October 2, 1986 (age 39) San Carlos, Cojedes, Venezuela
- Height: 1.47 m (4 ft 10 in)
- Weight: 48 kg (106 lb)

Sport
- Country: Venezuela
- Sport: Weightlifting
- Event: 48kg
Medal record
Women's Weightlifting
Representing Venezuela
Pan American Games
Silver medal – second place	2007 Rio de Janeiro	– 48 kg
Silver medal – second place	2011 Guadalajara	– 48 kg
Pan American Championships
Gold medal – first place	2008 Callao	– 48 kg
Pan American Sports Festival
Gold medal – first place	2014 Mexico	– 48 kg C&J
Bronze medal – third place	2014 Mexico	– 48 kg Snatch
Central American and Caribbean Games
Bronze medal – third place	2006 Cartagena	– 53 kg Snatch
Bronze medal – third place	2006 Cartagena	– 53 kg C&J
Bronze medal – third place	2006 Cartagena	– 53 kg Total

Betsi Gabriela Rivas Arteaga (born October 2, 1986 in San Carlos, Cojedes, Venezuela) is a weightlifter from Venezuela. She won the silver medal at the 2007 Pan American Games for her native South American country in the – 48 kg weight division. Her first name is sometimes also spelled as Betsy.

She won the gold medal in clean and jerk and bronze in snatch during the 2014 Pan American Sports Festival.

She also competed at the 2012 Summer Olympics.
