= Luis García (weightlifter) =

Dominican Republic weightlifter

Luis Alberto García Brito
Personal information
- Nationality: Dominican
- Born: 19 April 1995 (age 31) Santo Domingo
- Height: 1.48 m (4 ft 10 in)
- Weight: 56 kg (123 lb)

Sport
- Country: Dominican Republic
- Sport: Weightlifting
- Coached by: Bienvenido Rodríguez
Medal record
Men's weightlifting
Representing Dominican Republic
Pan American Games
Bronze medal – third place	2015 Toronto	– 56 kg
Pan American Championships
Bronze medal – third place	2016 Cartagena	– 56 kg Snatch
Central American and Caribbean Games
Silver medal – second place	2014 Veracruz	– 56 kg Snatch
Silver medal – second place	2014 Veracruz	– 56 kg Clean & Jerk
Silver medal – second place	2026 Santo Domingo	– 60 kg Clean & Jerk
Bronze medal – third place	2026 Santo Domingo	– 60 kg Snatch
Junior Pan American Championships
Gold medal – first place	2015 Cartagena	– 56 kg Snatch
Gold medal – first place	2015 Cartagena	– 56 kg C&J
Gold medal – first place	2015 Cartagena	– 56 kg Total
Summer Universiade
Silver medal – second place	2017 Taipei	— 56 kg

Luis Alberto García Brito (born 19 April 1995 in Santo Domingo) is a Dominican Olympic weightlifter. He represented his country at the 2016 Summer Olympics.

== Career ==
García won two silver medals in the 2014 Central American and Caribbean Games hel in Veracruz, Mexico, taking part in the 56 kg category.

In his participation in the 2015 Pan American Games he won the 56 kg category bronze medal, lifting 115 kg in snatch, 141 kg in clean and jerk and a total of 256 kg. He won three gold medals in the 2015 Pan American Junior Championships in the 56 kg category. He won the snatch bronze medal in the 56 kg category of the 2016 Pan American Championships.

He represented the Dominican Republic at the 2020 Summer Olympics. He won a silver medal in snatch and bronze in clean and jerk in the 60 kg category of the 2026 Central American and Caribbean Games.
