= Habib de las Salas =

Colombian weightlifter (born 1987)

Personal information
- Nationality: Colombian
- Born: 19 April 1987 (age 39)
- Height: 1.59 m (5 ft 3 in)
- Weight: 56 kg (123 lb)

Sport
- Country: Colombia
- Sport: Weightlifting
- Weight class: 61 kg
Medal record
Representing Colombia
Men's weightlifting
Pan American Games
Gold medal – first place	2015 Toronto	56 kg
Pan American Championships
Gold medal – first place	2014 Santo Domingo	56 kg
Gold medal – first place	2016 Cartagena	56 kg
Bronze medal – third place	2022 Bogotá	61 kg
South American Games
Silver medal – second place	2022 Asunción	61 kg
Bolivarian Games
Gold medal – first place	2022 Valledupar	61 kg S
Gold medal – first place	2022 Valledupar	61 kg CJ

Habib de las Salas de la Rosa (born 19 April 1987) is a Colombian Olympic weightlifter. He represented his country at the 2016 Summer Olympics.

He won the bronze medal in his event at the 2022 Pan American Weightlifting Championships held in Bogotá, Colombia. He won the silver medal in his event at the 2022 South American Games held in Asunción, Paraguay.
