= Oliba Nieve =

Ecuadorian weightlifter (born 1977)

Personal information
- Born: November 25, 1977 (age 48)
- Height: 1.68 m (5 ft 6 in)
- Weight: 90 kg (198 lb)

Sport
- Country: Ecuador
- Sport: Weightlifting
- Event: +75kg
Medal record
Women's Weightlifting
Representing Ecuador
Pan American Games
Gold medal – first place	2007 Rio de Janeiro	+75 kg
Gold medal – first place	2011 Guadalajara	+75 kg
Silver medal – second place	2003 Santo Domingo	+ 75 kg
Bronze medal – third place	2015 Toronto	+75 kg
Pan American Championships
Gold medal – first place	2008 Callao	+ 75 kg
Gold medal – first place	2010 Guatemala City	+ 75 kg
Bronze medal – third place	2017 Miami	90 kg
Bolivarian Games
Bronze medal – third place	2013 Trujillo	+75 kg
- Updated on 21 November 2013

Oliba Seledina Nieves Arroyo (born 1977-11-25 in Esmeraldas) is a female weightlifter from Ecuador. She won a gold medal at the 2007 Pan American Games for her native South American country in the + 75 kg weight division.

== Career ==
Nieves won the gold medal of the 2007 Pan American Games +75 kg category. She won the gold medal of the 2012 Pre-Olympic Championship held in Guatemala, winning the berth to the 2012 Summer Olympics. Nieve finished in the eight place in the +75 kg category in London, after lifting 255 kg.

Nieves also won the bronze medal in the 2013 Bolivarian Games in Trujillo, Peru.
