= Kyle Pierce (kinesiologist) =

Kyle Pierce is an associate professor of kinesiology and health science at Louisiana State University in Shreveport and director of the LSUS United States Weightlifting Development Center.

Pierce is a former weightlifter, and his studies in kinesiology are most often applied to sports and athletic performance, especially in the sport of Olympic weightlifting.

In 2017, Pierce was inducted into the USA Weightlifting Federation Hall of Fame.

== Doc Counsilman award ==
In May 2006, Pierce was named as the recipient of the United States Olympic Committee's Doc Counsilman Science Award for 2005. Named for the Indiana University swimming coach and instituted by the USOC in 2003, the Counsilman Award honors coaches who conduct and use research, along with developing innovative training methods. Pierce was one of three finalists for the 2004 award, and received it on June 23, 2006, in La Jolla, California at the Night of Champions Reception, which opened the United States Olympic Assembly.
