= Bredni Roque =

Mexican weightlifter (born 1987)

Bredni Roque Mendoza
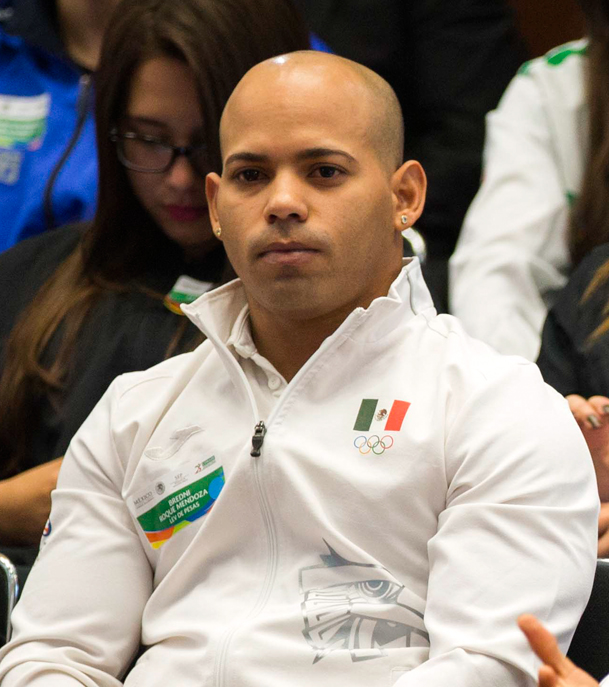
- Bredni Roque (2016)

Personal information
- Nationality: Mexican
- Born: 11 November 1987 (age 38) Pinar del Río, Cuba
- Height: 1.60 m (5 ft 3 in)
- Weight: 69 kg (152 lb)

Sport
- Country: Mexico
- Sport: Weightlifting
Medal record
Representing Mexico
Pan American Games
Silver medal – second place	2015 Toronto	69kg

Bredni Roque Mendoza (born 11 November 1987) is a Mexican Olympic weightlifter. He represented his country at the 2016 Summer Olympics and finished 4th after one competitor was disqualified due to doping.
