= Edwin Mosquera (weightlifter) =

Colombian weightlifter (1985–2017)

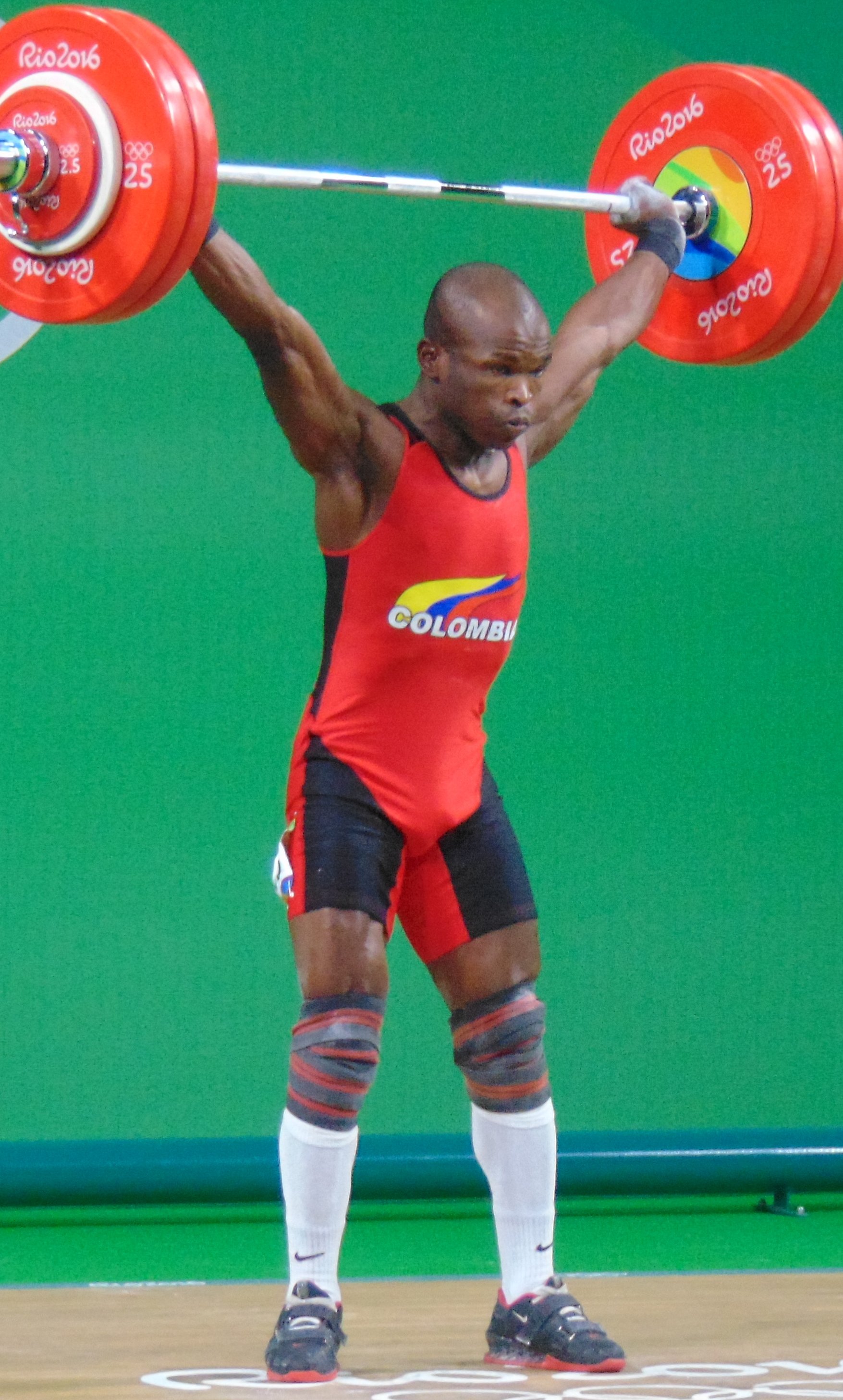
- Mosquera at the 2016 Summer Olympics

Personal information
- Born: 26 July 1985 El Carmen de Atrato, Colombia
- Died: 2 December 2017 (aged 32) Palmira, Valle del Cauca, Colombia
- Height: 1.65 m (5 ft 5 in)
- Weight: 69 kg (152 lb)

Sport
- Sport: Weightlifting
- Club: Armed Forces
- Coached by: Oswaldo Pinilla
Medal record
Representing Colombia
Pan American Games
Silver medal – second place	2007 Rio de Janeiro	– 69 kg
Pan American Championships
Gold medal – first place	2008 Callao	– 69 kg
Gold medal – first place	2010 Guatemala City	– 69 kg
Silver medal – second place	2016 Cartagena	– 69 kg

Edwin Orlando Mosquera Roa (26 July 1985 – 2 December 2017) was a Colombian weightlifter who competed in the 69 kg division. He won silver medals at the 2007 Pan American Games and 2016 Pan American Championships, and won the Pan American Championships in 2008 and 2010. He placed 7th at the 2016 Olympics, but had to withdraw from the 2008 Games due to a kneecap injury.

Mosquera died on 2 December 2017, after being shot twice.
