= Edouard Joseph =

Haitian weightlifter

Personal information
- Nationality: Haitian
- Born: 24 December 1989 (age 36)
- Height: 1.52 m (5 ft 0 in)
- Weight: 60 kg (132 lb)

Sport
- Country: Haiti
- Sport: Weightlifting

Edouard Joseph (born 24 December 1989) is a Haitian Olympic weightlifter. He represented his country at the 2016 Summer Olympics in the Men's 62 kg event, where he did not finish. Joseph was the first Olympic weightlifter for Haiti in over 50 years. He won the bronze medal in the clean & jerk at the 2014 Pan American Weightlifting Championships.

== Major results ==
Year	Venue	Weight	Snatch (kg)				Clean & Jerk (kg)				Total	Rank
Year	Venue	Weight	1	2	3	Rank	1	2	3	Rank	Total	Rank
Pan American Weightlifting Championships
2014	Santo Domingo, Dominican Republic	56 kg	100	~~105~~	~~106~~	6	128	132	135	3rd place, bronze medalist(s)	235	5
