= Kendrick Farris =

American weightlifter (born 1986)

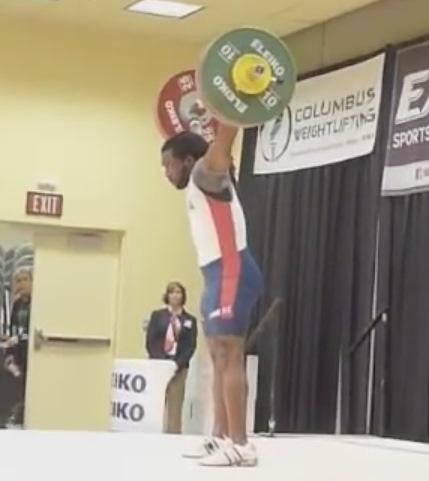
- Farris at the 2012 USA Weightlifting Nationals

Personal information
- Full name: Kendrick James Farris
- Born: July 2, 1986 (age 39) Shreveport, Louisiana, U.S.
- Height: 5 ft 9 in (175 cm)
- Weight: 94 kg (207 lb)
- Website: www.kingsofweightlifting.com

Sport
- Country: United States
- Sport: Weightlifting
- Event: 94 kg
- Coached by: Kyle Pierce
Medal record
Men's weightlifting
Representing the United States
Pan American Championships
Gold medal – first place	2010 Guatemala City	– 85 kg
Pan American Games
Bronze medal – third place	2011 Guadalajara	– 85 kg
Gold medal – first place	2015 Toronto	– 94 kg
Summer Universiade
Silver medal – second place	2013 Kazan	– 94 kg

Kendrick James Farris (born July 2, 1986) is an Olympic weightlifter from the United States. He competed for the United States in the 85 kg weight class at the 2008 Summer Olympics where he placed 8th. Farris also participated in the 2012 Summer Olympics in London where he placed 10th. He was the silver medalist at the 2013 Summer Universiade and the Pan-American Champion in 2010. Kyle Pierce was his coach.

During the Olympic trials on May 8, 2016, Farris broke the U.S. record by lifting a total of 831 pounds (377 kg) – 370 pounds (170 kg) in the snatch and 461 pounds (209 kg) in the clean and jerk.

In the 2016 Olympics, Farris finished 11th in the 94 kg weight class, with a 160 kg snatch and 197 kg clean and jerk.

== Personal life ==
Born in Shreveport, Louisiana, Farris is a graduate of Louisiana State University in Shreveport. He is an American. He and his wife Katrina have two sons named Khalil and Kingsley. He has been a vegan since late 2014.

== See also ==
- List of vegans
