= Mercedes Pérez =

Colombian weightlifter (born 1987)

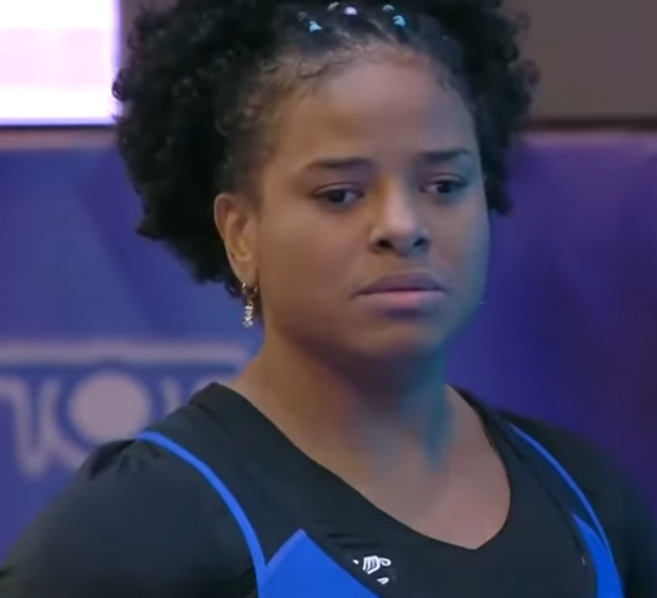
- At the 2019 World Weightlifting Championships

Personal information
- Born: Mercedes Isabel Pérez Tigreros; August 7, 1987 (age 38) Santa Marta, Magdalena, Colombia
- Height: 1.57 m (5 ft 2 in)
- Weight: 64 kg (141 lb)

Sport
- Country: Colombia
- Sport: Weightlifting

Achievements and titles
- Personal bests: Snatch: 106 kg (2019); Clean and jerk: 132 kg (2019); Total: 238 kg (2019)
Medal record
Representing Colombia
Women's weightlifting
World Championships
Bronze medal – third place	2017 Anaheim	63 kg
Pan American Games
Gold medal – first place	2011 Guadalajara	69 kg
Gold medal – first place	2015 Toronto	63 kg
Gold medal – first place	2019 Lima	64 kg
Pan American Championships
Gold medal – first place	2008 Callao	63 kg
Gold medal – first place	2009 Chicago	63 kg
Gold medal – first place	2012 Antigua Guatemala	69 kg
Gold medal – first place	2013 Margarita Island	69 kg
Gold medal – first place	2014 Santo Domingo	63 kg
Gold medal – first place	2016 Cartagena	63 kg
Gold medal – first place	2017 Miami	63 kg
Gold medal – first place	2018 Santo Domingo	69 kg
Gold medal – first place	2019 Guatemala City	64 kg
Silver medal – second place	2010 Guatemala City	63 kg
Silver medal – second place	2020 Santo Domingo	64 kg
Central American and Caribbean Games
Gold medal – first place	2018 Barranquilla	69 kg CJ
Silver medal – second place	2018 Barranquilla	69 kg S
South American Games
Gold medal – first place	2018 Cochabamba	69 kg
Silver medal – second place	2014 Santiago	63 kg
Junior World Championships
Gold medal – first place	2007 Prague	63 kg
Silver medal – second place	2006 Hangzhou	58 kg

Mercedes Isabel Pérez Tigreros (born August 7, 1987) is a female Colombian weightlifter competing in the 63 kg category until 2018 and 64 kg starting in 2018 after the International Weightlifting Federation reorganized the categories.

== Career ==
=== Olympics ===
She competed at the 2008 Summer Olympics in Beijing competing in the 63 kg division. Originally she finished ninth but the original silver medalist Irina Nekrassova failed a doping control and her results were disqualified, as a result, Mercedes got moved up to eight place.

In 2016 she competed at the 2016 Summer Olympics in the 63 kg division finishing fourth overall.

In 2021 she competed at the 2020 Summer Olympics In the 64 kg.

== Achievements ==
Year	Venue	Weight	Snatch (kg)				Clean & Jerk (kg)				Total	Rank
Year	Venue	Weight	1	2	3	Rank	1	2	3	Rank	Total	Rank
Representing Colombia
Olympic Games
2008	Beijing, China	63 kg	93	97	~~100~~	8	120	~~126~~	~~126~~	8	217	8
2016	Rio de Janeiro, Brazil	63 kg	100	~~104~~	104	5	125	130	~~137~~	4	234	4
2020	Tokyo, Japan	64 kg	~~101~~	101	~~105~~	5	126	~~131~~	~~131~~	5	227	4
World Championships
2005	Doha, Qatar	58 kg	82	86	88	8	~~105~~	105	109	9	197	9
2006	Santo Domingo, Dominican Republic	58 kg	~~90~~	~~90~~	90	8	~~105~~	105	111	8	201	6
2007	Chiang Mai, Thailand	63 kg	97	~~101~~	~~101~~	10	~~120~~	—	—	—	—	—
2009	Goyang, South Korea	63 kg	~~95~~	95	100	13	122	125	~~128~~	8	225	11
2010	Antalya, Turkey	63 kg	95	99	~~101~~	10	~~125~~	125	~~130~~	9	224	8
2011	Paris, France	69 kg	95	98	100	12	125	130	~~134~~	7	230	10
2013	Wrocław, Poland	69 kg	~~100~~	100	105	7	130	~~135~~	~~135~~	7	235	7
2014	Almaty, Kazakhstan	63 kg	100	~~104~~	104	12	127	~~132~~	~~132~~	11	231	11
2015	Houston, United States	63 kg	97	~~103~~	~~103~~	12	125	130	~~137~~	8	227	8
2017	Anaheim, United States	63 kg	97	~~101~~	101	4	~~123~~	~~124~~	124	4	225	3rd place, bronze medalist(s)
2018	Ashgabat, Turkmenistan	64 kg	100	105	~~108~~	5	127	~~131~~	~~131~~	3rd place, bronze medalist(s)	232	4
2019	Pattaya, Thailand	64 kg	102	~~106~~	106 AM	5	128	132 AM	~~135~~	3rd place, bronze medalist(s)	238 AM	4
Pan American Championships
2008	Callao, Peru	63 kg	92	~~96~~	96	2nd place, silver medalist(s)	120	122	~~125~~	1st place, gold medalist(s)	218	1st place, gold medalist(s)
2009	Chicago, United States	63 kg	92	96	~~98~~	3rd place, bronze medalist(s)	117	123	126	1st place, gold medalist(s)	222	1st place, gold medalist(s)
2012	Antigua Guatemala, Guatemala	69 kg	100	~~105~~	105	2nd place, silver medalist(s)	130	~~135~~	135	1st place, gold medalist(s)	240	1st place, gold medalist(s)
2013	Margarita Island, Venezuela	69 kg	96	99	~~102~~	1st place, gold medalist(s)	123	127	~~130~~	1st place, gold medalist(s)	226	1st place, gold medalist(s)
2014	Santo Domingo, Dominican Republic	63 kg	98	101	102	2nd place, silver medalist(s)	123	126	~~130~~	1st place, gold medalist(s)	228	1st place, gold medalist(s)
2016	Cartagena, Colombia	63 kg	~~100~~	100	105	1st place, gold medalist(s)	126	~~130~~	~~130~~	1st place, gold medalist(s)	231	1st place, gold medalist(s)
2017	Miami, United States	63 kg	94	97	~~101~~	1st place, gold medalist(s)	121	124	~~126~~	2nd place, silver medalist(s)	221	1st place, gold medalist(s)
2018	Santo Domingo, Dominican Republic	69 kg	99	102	104	1st place, gold medalist(s)	125	130	~~135~~	1st place, gold medalist(s)	234	1st place, gold medalist(s)
2019	Guatemala City, Guatemala	64 kg	97	101	~~103~~	2nd place, silver medalist(s)	123	~~127~~	128	2nd place, silver medalist(s)	229	1st place, gold medalist(s)
2020	Santo Domingo, Dominican Republic	64 kg	100	104	~~106~~	3rd place, bronze medalist(s)	126	130	~~134~~	2nd place, silver medalist(s)	234	2nd place, silver medalist(s)
Pan American Games
2011	Guadalajara, Mexico	69 kg	98	101	~~103~~	2	125	131	~~135~~	1	232	1st place, gold medalist(s)
2015	Toronto, Canada	63 kg	95	103	~~107~~	1	120	132	~~136~~	1	235	1st place, gold medalist(s)
2019	Lima, Peru	64 kg	100	~~104~~	105	1	127	130	~~135~~	1	235	1st place, gold medalist(s)
Central American and Caribbean Games
2018	Barranquilla, Colombia	69 kg	~~102~~	102	107	2nd place, silver medalist(s)	~~127~~	~~129~~	130	1st place, gold medalist(s)	—N/a	—N/a
South American Games
2014	Santiago, Chile	63 kg	~~93~~	95	98	—N/a	122	~~125~~	~~125~~	—N/a	220	2nd place, silver medalist(s)
2018	Cochabamba, Bolivia	69 kg	~~100~~	100	105	—N/a	125	128	132	—N/a	237	1st place, gold medalist(s)
