= Cinthya Domínguez =

Mexican weightlifter (born 1982)

Personal information
- Born: October 29, 1982 (age 43)
Medal record
Women's Weightlifting
Representing Mexico
Pan American Games
Silver medal – second place	2007 Rio de Janeiro	– 69 kg
Pan American Championships
Silver medal – second place	2010 Guatemala City	– 75 kg
Central American and Caribbean Games
Silver medal – second place	2006 Cartagena	– 69 kg

Cinthya Domínguez Lara (born October 29, 1982) is a female weightlifter from Mexico. She won the silver medal at the 2007 Pan American Games for her native North American country in the – 69 kg weight division. In 2015 Domínguez was suspended after she failed a drug test (found trace of Oxandrolone).
