= José Montes =

Mexican weightlifter

Personal information
- Born: 18 April 1989 (age 37) Mérida, Yucatán, Mexico

Sport
- Sport: Weightlifting
Medal record
Representing Mexico
Pan American Games
Bronze medal – third place	2011 Guadalajara	56kg
Central American and Caribbean Games
Bronze medal – third place	2014 Veracruz	62kg

José Lino Montes Góngora is a Mexican weightlifter. He competed at the 2012 Summer Olympics in the Men's 56 kg, finishing 6th.

== Background ==
Montes was born on April 18, 1989, in Yucatán, Mexico. He competed in the 2012 London Olympics, with the nickname "Hércules Tekaxeño" and coached by Lazaro Medina Lugo.

Montes won bronze medals in snatch and clean and jerk during the 2014 Pan American Sports Festival.
