= Yineisy Reyes =

Dominican Republic weightlifter

Personal information
- Full name: Yineisy Paola Reyes Marinez
- Born: 8 November 1993 (age 32)
- Weight: 57.79 kg (127.4 lb)

Sport
- Country: Dominican Republic
- Sport: Weightlifting
- Team: National team
- Updated on 4 September 2016

Yineisy Paola Reyes Marinez (born 8 November 1993) is a Dominican Republic female weightlifter, competing in the 58 kg category and representing Dominican Republic at international competitions.

She competed at the 2010 Summer Youth Olympics. She competed at world championships, most recently at the 2014 World Weightlifting Championships.

== Major results ==
Year	Venue	Weight	Snatch (kg)				Clean & Jerk (kg)				Total	Rank
Year	Venue	Weight	1	2	3	Rank	1	2	3	Rank	Total	Rank
World Championships
2014	Almaty, Kazakhstan	58 kg	~~88~~	~~88~~	~~88~~	---	---	---	---	---	0	---
