= Eva Gurrola =

Mexican weightlifter (born 1994)

Eva Gurrola Ortiz
Personal information
- Born: 17 May 1994 (age 32) Hermosillo, Sonora, Mexico
- Height: 155 cm (5 ft 1 in)
- Weight: 63 kg (139 lb)

Sport
- Country: Mexico
- Sport: Weightlifting
- Event: Women's 63 kg

Eva Gurrola Ortiz (born 17 May 1994) is a Mexican weightlifter.

She competed at the 2016 Summer Olympics in Rio de Janeiro, in the women's 63 kg.
