= Dayana Chirinos =

Venezuelan weightlifter (born 1991)

Personal information
- Born: 4 October 1991 (age 34)

Sport
- Country: Venezuela
- Sport: Weightlifting
- Weight class: 87 kg
Medal record
Women's weightlifting
Representing Venezuela
Pan American Championships
Gold medal – first place	2024 Caracas	87 kg
Silver medal – second place	2014 Santo Domingo	69 kg
Silver medal – second place	2017 Miami	75 kg
Silver medal – second place	2021 Guayaquil	87 kg
Silver medal – second place	2025 Cali	86 kg
Bronze medal – third place	2020 Santo Domingo	87 kg
Central American and Caribbean Games
Gold medal – first place	2023 San Salvador	87 kg CJ
Bronze medal – third place	2018 Barranquilla	75 kg S
Bronze medal – third place	2023 San Salvador	87 kg S
South American Games
Bronze medal – third place	2018 Cochabamba	75 kg
Bronze medal – third place	2022 Asunción	87 kg
Bolivarian Games
Silver medal – second place	2022 Valledupar	87 kg CJ
Silver medal – second place	2024 Ayacucho	87 kg
Bronze medal – third place	2022 Valledupar	87 kg S

Dayana Chirinos (born 4 October 1991) is a Venezuelan weightlifter. She has won medals in weightlifting at the Bolivarian Games, Central American and Caribbean Games, South American Games and Pan American Weightlifting Championships.

== Career ==
Chirinos won the silver medal in the women's 75 kg event at the 2017 Pan American Weightlifting Championships held in Miami, United States. In 2021, she won the bronze medal in the women's 87 kg event at the 2020 Pan American Weightlifting Championships held in Santo Domingo, Dominican Republic. She finished in 4th place in the women's 81 kg event at the 2021 World Weightlifting Championships held in Tashkent, Uzbekistan.

Chirinos won the bronze medal in her event at the 2022 South American Games held in Asunción, Paraguay. She competed in the women's 81 kg event at the 2023 Pan American Games held in Santiago, Chile.

In 2024, she won the gold medal in the women's 87 kg event at the Pan American Weightlifting Championships held in Caracas, Venezuela. She won the silver medal in her event at the 2024 Bolivarian Games held in Ayacucho, Peru.
