= Julio Salamanca =

Salvadoran weightlifter (born 1989)

Julio Cesar Salamanca Pineda
Personal information
- Nationality: Salvadoran
- Born: 15 July 1989 (age 36)
- Height: 159 cm (5 ft 3 in) (2012)
- Weight: 61 kg (134 lb) (2012)

Sport
- Country: El Salvador
- Sport: Weightlifting
- Event: Men's 62 kg
Medal record
Men's Weightlifting
Representing El Salvador
Pan American Sports Festival
Gold medal – first place	2014 Mexico	– 62 kg C&J
Silver medal – second place	2014 Mexico	– 62 kg Snatch
Central American and Caribbean Games
Silver medal – second place	2010 Mayagüez	-56 kg Total
Silver medal – second place	2010 Mayagüez	-56 kg C&J
Bronze medal – third place	2010 Mayagüez	-56 kg Snatch
- Updated on 24 August 2012

Julio Cesar Salamanca Pineda (born 15 July 1989) is a Salvadoran weightlifter. He competed at the 2012 Summer Olympics in the Men's 62 kg, finishing 11th. At the 2016 Summer Olympics, he again competed in the Men's 62 kg, ranking 2nd in Group B and finishing 10th overall.

Salamanca won the 62 kg gold medal in clean & jerk and silver in snatch during the 2014 Pan American Sports Festival.
