= Rosane Santos =

Brazilian weightlifter

Personal information
- Full name: Rosane Reis Santos
- Born: 20 June 1987 (age 39)
- Height: 1.62 m (5 ft 4 in)
- Weight: 53 kg (117 lb)

Sport
- Sport: Weightlifting
- Event: Women's 53 kg

Rosane Reis Santos (born 20 June 1987) is a Brazilian weightlifter. She competed in the women's 53 kg event at the 2016 Summer Olympics.

In 2019, she competed in the women's 55 kg event at the 2019 World Weightlifting Championships held in Pattaya, Thailand.
