= Jaqueline Ferreira =

Brazilian weightlifter (born 1987)

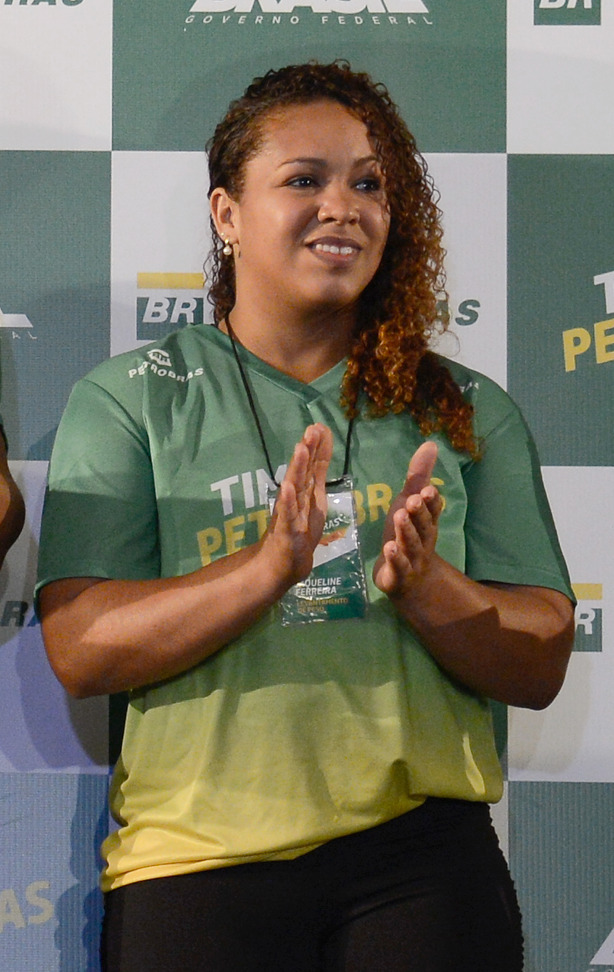
- Ferreira in 2016

Personal information
- Full name: Jaqueline Antonia Ferreira
- Born: March 5, 1987 (age 39) Rio de Janeiro, Brazil
- Height: 165 cm (5 ft 5 in)
- Weight: 75 kg (165 lb)

Sport
- Sport: Weightlifting
- Club: APCEF
- Coached by: Dragos Doru Stanica
Medal record
Representing Brazil
Pan American Games
Bronze medal – third place	2015 Toronto	-75 kg
South American Games
Silver medal – second place	2010 Medellín	-69 kg

Jaqueline Antonia Ferreira (born March 5, 1987) is a Brazilian weightlifter who competes in the −75 kg weight division. She placed eighth at the 2012 Olympics and qualified for the 2016 Rio Games. She won a silver medal in clean and jerk and a bronze in snatch at the 2014 Pan American Sports Festival. She also won a bronze medal at the 2015 Pan American Games.

She represented Brazil at the 2020 Summer Olympics held in Tokyo, Japan. She competed in the women's 87 kg event.
