= Ubaldina Valoyes =

Colombian weightlifter (born 1982)

Personal information
- Born: 6 July 1982 (age 44) Quibdó, Chocó
- Height: 1.58 m (5 ft 2 in)
- Weight: 69 kg (152 lb)

Sport
- Country: Colombia
- Sport: Weightlifting
- Event: 69kg
Medal record
Representing Colombia
Women's weightlifting
Olympic Games
Bronze medal – third place	2012 London	69 kg
Pan American Games
Gold medal – first place	2003 Santo Domingo	63 kg
Gold medal – first place	2007 Rio de Janeiro	75 kg
Gold medal – first place	2011 Guadalajara	75 kg
Gold medal – first place	2015 Toronto	75 kg
Pan American Championships
Gold medal – first place	2010 Guatemala City	75 kg
Silver medal – second place	2008 Callao	75 kg
Pan American Sports Festival
Gold medal – first place	2014 Mexico City	75 kg Snatch
Gold medal – first place	2014 Mexico City	75 kg Clean & Jerk
Central American and Caribbean Games
Gold medal – first place	2006 Cartagena	75 kg

Ubaldina Valoyes Cuesta (born 6 July 1982 in Quibdó, Chocó) is a female weightlifter from Colombia. She won a gold medal at the 2007 Pan American Games for her native South American country. Valoyes has represented Colombia at the Summer Olympics three times: in 2004, 2008 and 2012. She won the – 75 kg gold medal in snatch and clean & jerk during the 2014 Pan American Sports Festival.
