= Rusmeris Villar =

Colombian weightlifter (born 1983)

Personal information
- Born: 28 March 1983 (age 43) Cartagena, Colombia
Medal record
Representing Colombia
Women's Weightlifting
Pan American Games
| Gold medal – first place | 2015 Toronto | 53 kg |
| Silver medal – second place | 2007 Rio de Janeiro | 58 kg |
Pan American Championships
| Gold medal – first place | 2010 Guatemala City | 53 kg |
| Bronze medal – third place | 2008 Callao | 58 kg |
Central American and Caribbean Games
| Silver medal – second place | 2006 Cartagena | 53 kg |

Rusmeris Villar Barboza (born 28 March 1983) is a female weightlifter from Colombia. She won the silver medal at the 2007 Pan American Games for her native South American country in the – 58 kg weight division.
