= 2014 Pan American Sports Festival =

I Pan American Sports Festival
- Host city: Mexico City
- Country: Mexico
- Nations: 41
- Athletes: 3,200
- Events: 23 sports
- Dates: July 11, 2014 - September 30, 2014
- Website: Official website (archived)

The I Pan American Sports Festival (Spanish: Festival Deportivo Panamericano) was a multi-sport event held between 11 July and 30 September 2014 in Mexico. The Festival was organized by the Pan American Sports Organization (PASO).

== Venues ==
The festival was held at various locations throughout Mexico.

City	Venue	Sport	Date
Aguascalientes, Aguascalientes	Velódromo Bicentenario	Track Cycling	10–14 September
Cuautlancingo, Puebla	Complejo Deportivo Cuautlancingo	Artistic roller skating	16–19 July
Cuautlancingo, Puebla	Complejo Deportivo Cuautlancingo	Roller speed skating	16–19 July
Guadalajara, Jalisco	Complejo Nissan de Gimnasia	Artistic gymnastics	17–19 July
Guadalajara, Jalisco	Complejo Nissan de Gimnasia	Rhythmic gymnastics	25–27 July
Guadalajara, Jalisco	Complejo Nissan de Gimnasia	Trampolining	26–27 July
Guadalajara, Jalisco	Complejo de Racquetbol de la Unidad Deportiva Revolución	Racquetball	2–8 August
Huauchinango, Puebla	Río el Sifón	Slalom canoeing	11–13 July
Mexico City	Alberca Olímpica Francisco Márquez	Diving	27–30 September
Mexico City	Alberca Olímpica Francisco Márquez	Swimming	26–30 September
Mexico City	Centro Deportivo Olímpico Mexicano (CDOM)	Modern pentathlon	17–20 July
Mexico City	Centro Deportivo Olímpico Mexicano (CDOM)	Synchronized swimming	27–29 September
Mexico City	Centro Nacional de Desarrollo de Talentos Deportivos y Alto Rendimiento (CNAR)	Fencing	11–14 September
Mexico City	Centro Nacional de Desarrollo de Talentos Deportivos y Alto Rendimiento (CNAR)	Table tennis	17–20 July
Mexico City	Centro Nacional de Desarrollo de Talentos Deportivos y Alto Rendimiento (CNAR)	Weightlifting	19–21 July
Mexico City	Estadio de atletismo Jesús Martínez "Palillo"	Athletics	15–16 August
Mexico City	Gimnasio Edel Ojeda, Instituto Politécnico Nacional (IPN), Unidad Zacatenco	Wrestling	15–17 July
Mexico City	Gimnasio Olímpico Juan de la Barrera	Boxing	16–20 July
Mexico City	Pista Olímpica de Remo y Canotaje "Virgilio Uribe" (Cuemanco)	Canoeing	5–7 September
Mexico City	Pista Olímpica de Remo y Canotaje "Virgilio Uribe" (Cuemanco)	Rowing	17–20 July
Monterrey, Nuevo León	Parque Fundidora	Triathlon	7 September
Pachuca, Hidalgo	Centro de Convenciones TUZOFORUM	Judo	13–14 September
Puebla, Puebla	Boliche Noria Pro	Bowling	17–20 July
Puebla, Puebla	Gimnasio Miguel Hidalgo	Taekwondo	19–21 July
Querétaro, Querétaro	Auditorio José María Arteaga	Badminton	13–15 September
Tequesquitengo (Jojutla), Morelos	Playa Xoxo	Open water swimming	26–29 September
Tequesquitengo (Jojutla), Morelos	Pista de Esquí Acuático Aqua Ski	Water skiing	16–20 July
Tlaxcala, Tlaxcala	Pabellón commercial del Centro Expositor de Tlaxcala	Karate	26–27 July
Toluca, State of Mexico	Autonomous University of Mexico State (UAEM)	Archery	17–20 July
Zinacantepec, State of Mexico	Canchas de Squash de IMCUFIDE	Squash	7–13 September

== The Games ==
=== Participating nations ===
- Argentina
- Brazil
- Canada
- Chile
- Colombia
- Cuba
- Dominican Republic
- Ecuador
- Mexico
- Puerto Rico
- United States
- Venezuela
- Uruguay
- Antigua and Barbuda
- Aruba
- Bahamas
- Barbados
- Bermuda
- Bolivia
- Costa Rica
- El Salvador
- Grenada
- Guatemala
- Guyana
- Haiti
- Honduras
- Cayman Islands
- Virgin Islands
- British Virgin Islands
- Jamaica
- Nicaragua
- Panama
- Paraguay
- Peru
- Saint Vincent and the Grenadines
- Saint Lucia
- Saint Kitts and Nevis
- Suriname
- Trinidad and Tobago

=== Sports ===
- Aquatic sports
  - Diving
  - Open water swimming
  - Swimming
  - Synchronized swimming
- Archery
- Athletics
- Badminton
- Bowling
- Boxing
- Canoeing
  - Canoeing
  - Slalom canoeing
- Cycling
- Fencing
- Gymnastics
  - Artistic gymnastics
  - Rhythmic gymnastics
  - Trampolining
- Judo
- Karate
- Modern pentathlon
- Racquetball
- Roller skating
  - Artistic roller skating
  - Roller speed skating
- Rowing
- Squash
- Table tennis
- Taekwondo
- Triathlon
- Water skiing
- Weightlifting
- Wrestling

=== Medals table ===
* Host nation (Mexico)

Rank	Nation	Gold	Silver	Bronze	Total
1	Cuba (CUB)	64	37	25	126
2	Brazil (BRA)	55	38	40	133
3	Mexico (MEX)*	49	58	53	160
4	United States (USA)	38	23	39	100
5	Colombia (COL)	29	34	36	99
6	Venezuela (VEN)	27	15	45	87
7	Canada (CAN)	20	45	43	108
8	Argentina (ARG)	16	22	39	77
9	Ecuador (ECU)	12	9	20	41
10	Dominican Republic (DOM)	8	18	16	42
11	Chile (CHI)	6	13	24	43
12	Puerto Rico (PUR)	3	5	8	16
13	Guatemala (GUA)	2	9	6	17
14	Jamaica (JAM)	2	5	6	13
15	Peru (PER)	2	2	10	14
16	El Salvador (ESA)	2	1	1	4
17	Dominica (DMA)	2	0	0	2
18	Costa Rica (CRC)	1	2	5	8
19	Paraguay (PAR)	1	2	2	5
20	Panama (PAN)	1	1	3	5
21	Bahamas (BAH)	1	1	0	2
21	Saint Lucia (LCA)	1	1	0	2
Totals (22 entries)		342	341	421	1,104

Source: Official website (archived)
