= Yoelmis Hernández =

Cuban weightlifter

Personal information
- Full name: Yoelmis Hernández Paumier
- Born: 25 April 1986 (age 40) Nueva Gerona, Cuba
- Height: 1.68 m (5 ft 6 in)
- Weight: 84 kg (185 lb)

Sport
- Country: Cuba
- Sport: Weightlifting
- Event: 85 kg
Medal record
Representing Cuba
Pan American Games
Gold medal – first place	2011 Guadalajara	85kg
Gold medal – first place	2015 Toronto	85kg

Yoelmis Hernández Paumier (born 25 April 1986) is a Cuban weightlifter competing in the 85 kg category. He finished in seventh place at the 2012 Summer Olympics. He competed at the 2016 Summer Olympics.

Hernández won the 85 kg gold medals in snatch and clean & jerk during the 2014 Pan American Sports Festival.
