= Yaniuska Espinosa =

Venezuelan weightlifter (born 1986)

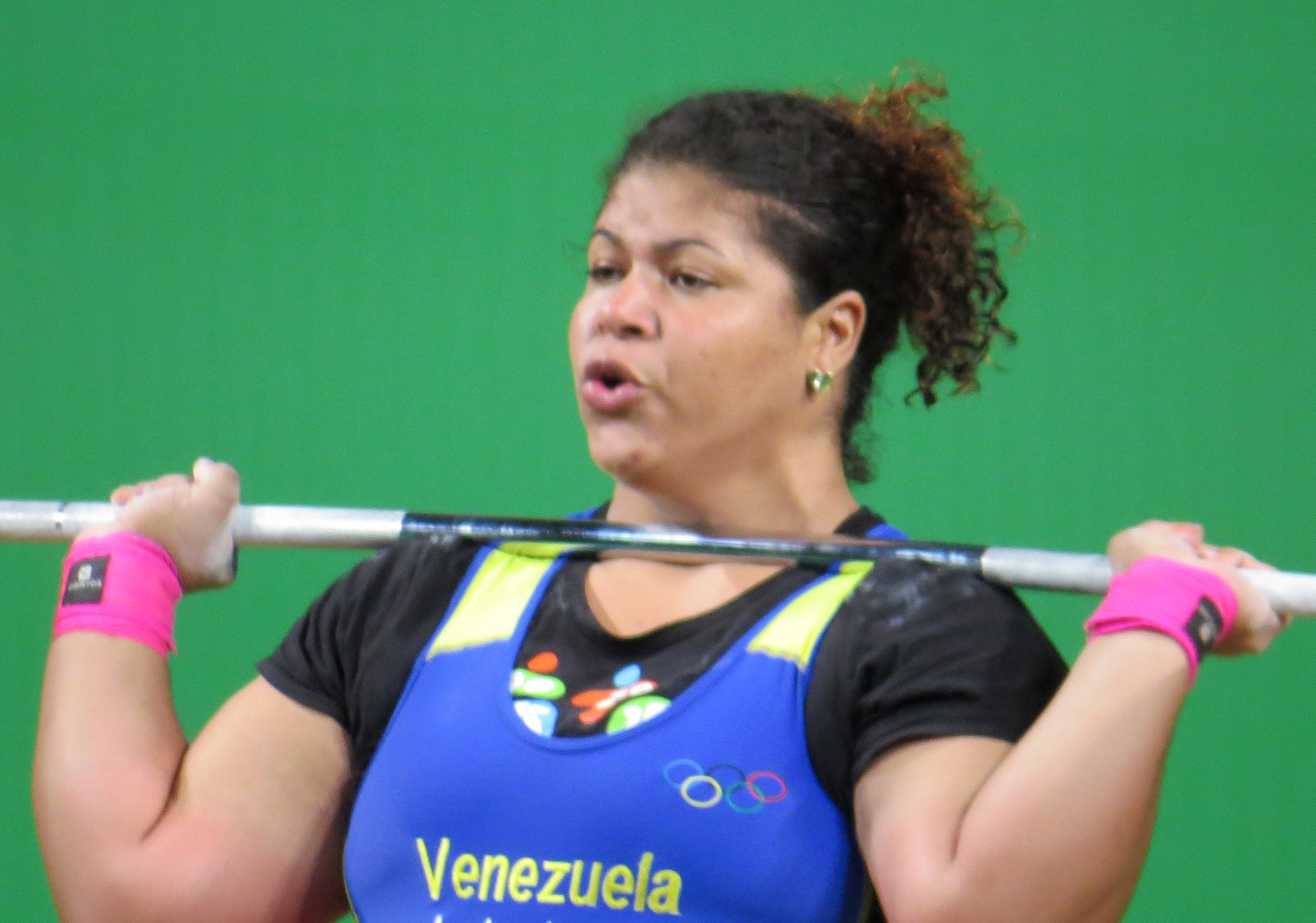
- Espinosa at the 2016 Olympics

Personal information
- Full name: Yaniuska Isabel Espinosa
- Born: 5 December 1986 (age 39) Puerto Cabello, Venezuela
- Height: 1.72 m (5 ft 8 in)
- Weight: 114 kg (251 lb)

Sport
- Country: Venezuela
- Sport: Weightlifting
- Event: Women's +75 kg
- Coached by: Jorge Rivero
Medal record
Pan American Games
Gold medal – first place	2015 Toronto	+75 kg
Pan American Weightlifting Championships
Silver medal – second place	2013 Isla Margarita	+75 kg
Gold medal – first place	2014 Santo Domingo	+75 kg
South American Games
Gold medal – first place	2018 Cochabamba	+90 kg
Silver medal – second place	2022 Asunción	+87 kg
Bolivarian Games
Silver medal – second place	2022 Valledupar	+87 kg S
Silver medal – second place	2022 Valledupar	+87 kg CJ

Yaniuska Isabel Espinosa (born 5 December 1986) is a Venezuelan weightlifter who competes in the +75 kg division.

== Career ==
=== Early achievements ===
She won gold medals at the 2014 Pan American Championships and 2015 Pan American Games, and placed seventh at the 2016 Olympics.

=== Early life ===
Espinosa took up weightlifting aged 13 in Puerto Cabello. She is married to Juan Jose Camacaro and has three sons, Luis Alberto (b. 2007), Luis Eduardo (b. 2007) and Omar Jesus (b. 2008).

=== Later achievement ===
She won the silver medal in her event at the 2022 South American Games held in Asunción, Paraguay.
