= Leydi Solís =

Colombian weightlifter (born 1990)

Personal information
- Nationality: Colombian
- Born: Leydi Yesenia Solís Arboleda; 17 February 1990 (age 36) Tuluá, Valle del Cauca, Colombia
- Height: 1.68 m (5 ft 6 in)
- Weight: 76.85 kg (169 lb)

Sport
- Country: Colombia
- Sport: Weightlifting
- Events: 63 kg; 69 kg; 75 kg; 81 kg
- Club: Bogota
Medal record
Representing Colombia
Women's weightlifting
Olympic Games
Silver medal – second place	2008 Beijing	69 kg
World Championships
Gold medal – first place	2017 Anaheim	69 kg
Gold medal – first place	2019 Pattaya	81 kg
Pan American Games
Gold medal – first place	2007 Rio de Janeiro	63 kg
Gold medal – first place	2015 Toronto	69 kg
Pan American Championships
Gold medal – first place	2008 Callao	69 kg
Gold medal – first place	2010 Guatemala City	69 kg
Gold medal – first place	2017 Miami	69 kg
Central American and Caribbean Games
Gold medal – first place	2018 Barranquilla	75 kg CJ
Silver medal – second place	2006 Cartagena	63 kg
Silver medal – second place	2018 Barranquilla	75 kg S
South American Games
Gold medal – first place	2014 Santiago	69 kg

Leydi Yesenia Solís Arboleda (born 17 February 1990) is a Colombian weightlifter. She won a gold medal at the 2007 Pan American Games for her native South American country, and carried the flag at the opening ceremony. Solís represented Colombia at the 2008 Summer Olympics in Beijing, China, finishing in fourth place in her weight division. She won the – 69 kg gold medal in snatch and clean & jerk during the 2014 Pan American Sports Festival.

== 2008 Summer Olympics performance ==
Solís won a silver medal at the 2008 Summer Olympics behind Russia's Oxana Slivenko. Solís lifted 105 kg and took the silver medal with a total weight of 240 kg, compared to 255 kg by Slivenko.
