= Pan American Sports Festival =

- Abbreviation: Pan Am Sports Festival
- Purpose: Multi-sport event for nations on the American continent
- Inaugurated: 2014 Pan American Sports Festival in Mexico City, Mexico
- Most recent: 2014 Pan American Sports Festival in Mexico City, Mexico

The Pan American Sports Festival (Spanish: Festival Deportivo Panamericano) is a multi-sport event organized by the Pan American Sports Organization (PASO) for athletes from the Americas. The event is held in co-ordination with ACODEPA (Asociación de Confederaciones Deportivas Panamericanas) and the Pan American elements of the Olympic movement.

The main purpose of the games is to serve as a development and training event to aid countries with their preparations for the larger Pan American Games competition, which follows one year after the festival. The festival's developmental aspect is also tied in with the subsequent Summer Olympics, which takes place a year after the Pan American Games. The first edition in 2014 included 24 Olympic sports within its program. For some of the sports, the event serves as a method of qualification for competing at the Pan American Games.

The idea for the festival came from Mario Vázquez Raña, a Mexican sports administrator and president of PASO. The event was approved in October 2013 by the PASO assembly. In addition to the developmental aspect of the event, Raña advocated its use as a way of supporting the region's federations by passing on technical knowledge, as well as fostering close ties between countries of the Americas. Unlike traditional multi-sport events, the Pan American Sports Festival is not limited to a specific city or area. The emphasis on training means the most appropriate pre-existing facilities are used instead, where possible, and location alone is not a major factor in venue selection. Training camps and coaching clinics are central aspects of the festival's events. The costs of an athlete's attendance are met by the organizers to encourage participation.

== Editions ==
Games	Year	Host city	Host nation	Opened by	Start Date	End Date	Nations	Competitors	Sports	Events	Top Placed Team
I	2014	Mexico City	Mexico		11 July	30 September	41	3,200	23		Cuba (CUB)

The 2014 Pan American Sports Festival was scheduled for July 11 to September 30 at various locations in Mexico. Roughly 3200 athletes from 41 nations took part in the 23 sports available at the inaugural event. The slalom canoeing competition in Puebla on July 11 was the debut contest of the festival's history. The continuation of the event beyond 2014 remained open-ended at the inception of the competition, with PASO preferring to assess the value of event after the conclusion of the first edition.
