= Junior Sánchez =

Venezuelan weightlifter (born 1989)

Personal information
- Born: 1 June 1989 (age 37) Barquisimeto, Venezuela

Sport
- Sport: Weightlifting
Medal record
Representing Venezuela
Pan American Games
Silver medal – second place	2011 Guadalajara	69kg
Silver medal – second place	2015 Toronto	77kg

Junior Antonio Sánchez Rivero (born 1 June 1989) is a Venezuelan weightlifter. He competed in the 69 kg event at the 2012 Summer Olympics and finished fifth. Sánchez won the silver medal in the 69kg event of the 2011 Pan American Games.
