= Weightlifting at the 2017 Summer Universiade – Women's 75 kg =

Women's 75 kg at the XXIX Summer Universiade
- Venues: Tamkang University Shao-Mo Memorial Gymnasium 7F
- Dates: 23 August 2017
- Competitors: 11 from 10 nations

Medalists
1st place, gold medalist(s)		Rim Jong-sim	North Korea
2nd place, silver medalist(s)		Darya Naumava	Belarus
3rd place, bronze medalist(s)		Yao Chi-ling	Chinese Taipei

The women's 75 kg event at the 2017 Summer Universiade was held on 23 August at the Tamkang University Shao-Mo Memorial Gymnasium 7F.

== Records ==
Prior to this competition, the existing world and Universiade records were as follows.

- Initial records

Category		Nation	Athlete	Record	Place	Date	Meet
World record	Snatch	Russia	Natalia Zabolotnaya	135 kg	Belgorod, Russia	1 December 2011	2011 President's Cup
World record	Clean & Jerk	North Korea	Kim Un-ju	164 kg	Incheon, South Korea	25 September 2014	2014 Asian Games
World record	Total	Russia	Natalia Zabolotnaya	296 kg	Belgorod, Russia	1 December 2011	2011 President's Cup
Universiade records	Snatch	Russia (RUS)	Nadezhda Evstyukhina	123 kg	Kazan, Russia	11 July 2013	2013 Summer Universiade
Universiade records	Clean & Jerk	Russia (RUS)	Olga Zubova	159 kg	Kazan, Russia	11 July 2013	2013 Summer Universiade
Universiade records	Total	Russia (RUS)	Olga Zubova	279 kg	Kazan, Russia	11 July 2013	2013 Summer Universiade

== Results ==
Rank	Athlete	Group	Body weight	Snatch (kg)				Clean & Jerk (kg)				Total
Rank	Athlete	Group	Body weight	1	2	3	Result	1	2	3	Result	Total
1st place, gold medalist(s)	Rim Jong-sim (PRK)	A	74.72	110	115	~~120~~	115	140	~~145~~	145	145	260
2nd place, silver medalist(s)	Darya Naumava (BLR)	A	74.96	95	100	105	105	130	135	–	135	240
3rd place, bronze medalist(s)	Yao Chi-ling (TPE)	A	74.72	96	101	105	105	126	131	~~136~~	131	236
4	Kristel Ngarlem (CAN)	A	74.13	~~95~~	~~95~~	95	95	121	125	~~128~~	125	220
5	Sun Mengling (CHN)	A	74.46	93	97	100	100	112	~~117~~	117	117	217
6	Rabia Kaya (TUR)	A	74.37	90	~~95~~	~~96~~	90	110	115	~~121~~	115	205
7	Sylvia Belinda Hoffman (USA)	A	71.57	88	91	~~96~~	91	107	113	~~115~~	113	204
8	Choi Ga-yeon (KOR)	A	74.79	91	94	~~96~~	94	105	~~110~~	~~110~~	105	199
9	Zoe Genevieve Glasson (NZL)	A	73.58	68	72	76	76	92	96	99	99	175
10	Eliška Pudivítrová (CZE)	A	69.55	~~77~~	77	80	80	90	94	~~96~~	94	174
11	Ruby Belle Haman (USA)	A	70.43	71	73	77	77	88	~~94~~	~~94~~	88	165
