= 2015 World Weightlifting Championships – Women's 75 kg =

Weightlifting event

The women's 75 kilograms event at the 2015 World Weightlifting Championships was held on 27 November 2015 in Houston, United States.

== Schedule ==
Date	Time	Event
27 November 2015	08:00	Group C
27 November 2015	10:00	Group B
27 November 2015	14:55	Group A

== Medalists ==
Event	Gold		Silver		Bronze	
Snatch	Kang Yue (CHN)	127 kg	Rim Jong-sim (PRK)	125 kg	Svetlana Podobedova (KAZ)	121 kg
Clean & Jerk	Rim Jong-sim (PRK)	155 kg	Kang Yue (CHN)	155 kg	Svetlana Podobedova (KAZ)	155 kg
Total	Kang Yue (CHN)	282 kg	Rim Jong-sim (PRK)	280 kg	Svetlana Podobedova (KAZ)	276 kg

== Records ==
Prior to this competition, the existing world records were as follows.

World record	Snatch	Natalya Zabolotnaya (RUS)	135 kg	Belgorod, Russia	17 December 2011
World record	Clean & Jerk	Kim Un-ju (PRK)	164 kg	Incheon, South Korea	25 September 2014
World record	Total	Natalya Zabolotnaya (RUS)	296 kg	Belgorod, Russia	17 December 2011

== Results ==
Rank	Athlete	Group	Body weight	Snatch (kg)				Clean & Jerk (kg)				Total
Rank	Athlete	Group	Body weight	1	2	3	Rank	1	2	3	Rank	Total
1st place, gold medalist(s)	Kang Yue (CHN)	A	74.78	127	~~130~~	~~130~~	1st place, gold medalist(s)	155	~~158~~	~~158~~	2nd place, silver medalist(s)	282
2nd place, silver medalist(s)	Rim Jong-sim (PRK)	A	73.66	120	125	~~128~~	2nd place, silver medalist(s)	150	155	~~157~~	1st place, gold medalist(s)	280
3rd place, bronze medalist(s)	Svetlana Podobedova (KAZ)	A	74.85	121	~~126~~	~~126~~	3rd place, bronze medalist(s)	147	~~155~~	155	3rd place, bronze medalist(s)	276
4	Nadezhda Evstyukhina (RUS)	A	74.23	115	~~121~~	~~121~~	4	141	146	~~151~~	4	261
5	Darya Naumava (BLR)	A	74.23	105	110	115	5	135	140	142	5	257
6	Ubaldina Valoyes (COL)	A	74.86	105	109	~~111~~	7	131	135	137	7	246
7	Jenny Arthur (USA)	A	74.65	100	103	106	9	133	138	~~140~~	6	244
8	Gaëlle Nayo-Ketchanke (FRA)	A	74.76	105	~~108~~	109	6	~~135~~	135	~~138~~	8	244
9	María Fernanda Valdés (CHI)	A	74.87	102	~~107~~	107	8	130	135	~~138~~	9	242
10	Jaqueline Ferreira (BRA)	A	74.87	102	~~105~~	105	10	123	130	~~133~~	11	235
11	Kang Yeoun-hee (KOR)	B	74.78	98	102	~~105~~	16	126	131	~~136~~	10	233
12	Alejandra Garza (MEX)	B	74.54	~~98~~	98	100	17	124	~~127~~	127	12	227
13	Rosa Tenorio (ECU)	B	73.82	98	103	~~105~~	13	120	~~123~~	123	13	226
14	Monique Araújo (BRA)	B	75.00	105	~~110~~	~~110~~	11	121	~~128~~	~~128~~	17	226
15	Yao Chi-ling (TPE)	B	75.00	96	100	103	15	~~123~~	123	~~130~~	16	226
16	Crismery Santana (DOM)	B	74.52	100	~~104~~	104	12	120	~~125~~	~~125~~	19	224
17	Ecaterina Tretiacova (MDA)	B	74.68	~~100~~	100	~~104~~	19	~~123~~	~~123~~	123	15	223
18	Małgorzata Wiejak (POL)	B	75.00	100	103	~~107~~	14	~~120~~	120	~~124~~	20	223
19	Hanna Kozenko (UKR)	B	74.67	98	~~100~~	100	18	118	~~123~~	~~123~~	23	218
20	Sona Poghosyan (ARM)	C	74.21	91	95	97	21	115	118	120	18	217
21	Tamara Salazar (ECU)	C	73.89	90	~~94~~	~~94~~	27	120	123	~~125~~	14	213
22	Omadoy Otakuziyeva (UZB)	C	73.18	88	91	94	23	110	114	118	21	212
23	Dina Ahmed (EGY)	B	74.20	92	~~96~~	~~97~~	25	~~118~~	118	~~121~~	22	210
24	Batboldyn Enkhtamir (MGL)	C	70.53	90	93	95	22	111	114	~~117~~	25	209
25	Ernestina Familia (DOM)	C	70.42	~~90~~	90	~~94~~	26	~~112~~	112	114	24	204
26	Camilla Fogagnolo (AUS)	C	72.80	84	89	~~91~~	29	107	112	114	26	203
27	Meri Ilmarinen (FIN)	C	74.00	~~90~~	90	92	24	110	~~112~~	~~112~~	27	202
28	Daysi Hutchinson (CRC)	C	74.89	85	~~90~~	90	28	105	~~110~~	~~112~~	29	195
29	Sara Sigmundsdóttir (ISL)	C	70.89	80	~~85~~	~~85~~	31	100	105	~~110~~	28	185
30	Erdenebatyn Bilegsaikhan (MGL)	C	74.04	81	84	~~86~~	30	~~95~~	95	~~102~~	30	179
—	Prabdeep Kaur Sanghera (CAN)	C	74.00	96	99	~~101~~	20	~~115~~	~~115~~	~~115~~	—	—
—	Lydia Valentín (ESP)	A	74.70	—	—	—	—	—	—	—	—	—
DQ	Olga Zubova (RUS)	A	74.38	120	~~124~~	~~124~~	—	150	~~156~~	156	—	276
