= 2017 World Weightlifting Championships – Women's 75 kg =

The Women's 75 kg competition at the 2017 World Weightlifting Championships was held on 3 December 2017.

== Schedule ==
Date	Time	Event
3 December 2017	17:55	Group A

== Medalists ==
Event	Gold		Silver		Bronze	
Snatch	Lydia Valentín (ESP)	118 kg	Neisi Dájomes (ECU)	108 kg	Mönkhjantsangiin Ankhtsetseg (MGL)	107 kg
Clean & Jerk	Lydia Valentín (ESP)	140 kg	Gaëlle Nayo-Ketchanke (FRA)	134 kg	Neisi Dájomes (ECU)	132 kg
Total	Lydia Valentín (ESP)	258 kg	Neisi Dájomes (ECU)	240 kg	Gaëlle Nayo-Ketchanke (FRA)	237 kg

== Records ==
Prior to this competition, the existing world records were as follows.

World record	Snatch	Natalya Zabolotnaya (RUS)	135 kg	Belgorod, Russia	17 December 2011
World record	Clean & Jerk	Kim Un-ju (PRK)	164 kg	Incheon, South Korea	25 September 2014
World record	Total	Natalya Zabolotnaya (RUS)	296 kg	Belgorod, Russia	17 December 2011

== Results ==
Rank	Athlete	Group	Snatch (kg)				Clean & Jerk (kg)				Total
Rank	Athlete	Group	1	2	3	Rank	1	2	3	Rank	Total
1st place, gold medalist(s)	Lydia Valentín (ESP)	A	110	115	118	1st place, gold medalist(s)	130	135	140	1st place, gold medalist(s)	258
2nd place, silver medalist(s)	Neisi Dájomes (ECU)	A	103	106	108	2nd place, silver medalist(s)	128	132	~~135~~	3rd place, bronze medalist(s)	240
3rd place, bronze medalist(s)	Gaëlle Nayo-Ketchanke (FRA)	A	100	103	~~105~~	6	131	134	~~138~~	2nd place, silver medalist(s)	237
4	Aremi Fuentes (MEX)	A	102	105	~~107~~	4	128	131	~~134~~	4	236
5	Jenny Arthur (USA)	A	~~102~~	102	104	5	130	~~133~~	~~134~~	5	234
6	Yao Chi-ling (TPE)	A	96	100	~~103~~	7	128	~~131~~	~~131~~	6	228
7	Marie-Ève Beauchemin-Nadeau (CAN)	A	94	~~99~~	99	10	121	~~126~~	128	7	227
8	Kristel Ngarlem (CAN)	A	96	99	~~101~~	9	123	~~128~~	128	8	227
9	Alejandra Garza (MEX)	A	97	100	~~104~~	8	123	~~127~~	~~127~~	10	223
10	Omadoy Otakuziyeva (UZB)	A	95	~~99~~	~~99~~	12	120	124	127	9	222
11	Ayumi Kamiya (JPN)	A	~~98~~	98	~~103~~	11	117	121	~~124~~	11	219
—	Mönkhjantsangiin Ankhtsetseg (MGL)	A	101	~~106~~	107	3rd place, bronze medalist(s)	—	—	—	—	—
