= 2013 World Weightlifting Championships – Women's 75 kg =

The women's competition in the –75 kg division was held on 25 October 2013 in Centennial Hall, Wrocław, Poland.

== Schedule ==
Date	Time	Event
25 October 2013	12:00	Group B
25 October 2013	19:55	Group A

== Medalists ==
Event	Gold		Silver		Bronze	
Snatch	Kang Yue (CHN)	126 kg	Lydia Valentín (ESP)	122 kg	Nadezhda Evstyukhina (RUS)	120 kg
Clean & Jerk	Nadezhda Evstyukhina (RUS)	157 kg	Kang Yue (CHN)	150 kg	Lydia Valentín (ESP)	138 kg
Total	Nadezhda Evstyukhina (RUS)	277 kg	Kang Yue (CHN)	276 kg	Lydia Valentín (ESP)	260 kg

== Records ==
Prior to this competition, the existing world records were as follows.

World Record	Snatch	Natalya Zabolotnaya (RUS)	135 kg	Belgorod, Russia	17 December 2011
World Record	Clean & Jerk	Nadezhda Evstyukhina (RUS)	163 kg	Paris, France	10 November 2011
World Record	Total	Natalya Zabolotnaya (RUS)	296 kg	Belgorod, Russia	17 December 2011

== Results ==
Rank	Athlete	Group	Body weight	Snatch (kg)				Clean & Jerk (kg)				Total
Rank	Athlete	Group	Body weight	1	2	3	Rank	1	2	3	Rank	Total
1st place, gold medalist(s)	Nadezhda Evstyukhina (RUS)	A	74.14	120	~~125~~	~~125~~	3rd place, bronze medalist(s)	150	157	~~163~~	1st place, gold medalist(s)	277
2nd place, silver medalist(s)	Kang Yue (CHN)	A	74.61	122	126	~~131~~	1st place, gold medalist(s)	~~150~~	~~150~~	150	2nd place, silver medalist(s)	276
3rd place, bronze medalist(s)	Lydia Valentín (ESP)	A	74.08	117	~~122~~	122	2nd place, silver medalist(s)	138	~~146~~	~~146~~	3rd place, bronze medalist(s)	260
4	Cinthya Domínguez (MEX)	A	73.10	103	106	109	4	127	131	135	4	244
5	Marie-Ève Beauchemin-Nadeau (CAN)	A	74.92	100	103	106	6	130	135	~~139~~	5	241
6	Hanna Kozenko (UKR)	A	74.05	98	101	104	7	124	128	~~133~~	6	232
7	Ewa Mizdal (POL)	A	73.89	100	103	106	5	125	~~129~~	~~130~~	7	231
8	Alejandra Garza (MEX)	A	74.05	97	100	102	8	118	120	122	8	224
9	Kanyaluk Choomanee (THA)	B	74.94	98	100	102	9	120	~~124~~	~~124~~	11	222
10	Rosa Tenorio (ECU)	B	73.06	95	99	101	10	115	120	~~124~~	10	221
11	Monique Araújo (BRA)	B	74.46	93	98	101	11	~~117~~	~~117~~	117	12	218
12	Patrycja Piechowiak (POL)	B	70.28	92	~~95~~	96	12	115	~~119~~	~~120~~	13	211
13	Figen Kaya (TUR)	B	69.01	85	~~88~~	88	13	105	110	113	14	201
—	Jaqueline Ferreira (BRA)	A	74.55	~~100~~	~~100~~	~~102~~	—	121	~~126~~	~~126~~	9	—
—	Lucia Trojčáková (SVK)	B	69.73	~~87~~	~~87~~	~~88~~	—	—	—	—	—	—
DQ	Olga Zubova (RUS)	A	74.00	120	~~125~~	125	—	~~151~~	151	157	—	—
