= Weightlifting at the 2018 Asian Games – Women's 75 kg =

Women's 75 kg at the 2018 Asian Games
- Venue: Jakarta International Expo
- Date: 26 August 2018
- Competitors: 10 from 9 nations

Medalists
gold medal	Rim Jong-sim	North Korea
silver medal	Omadoy Otakuziyeva	Uzbekistan
bronze medal	Mun Min-hee	South Korea

The women's 75 kilograms event at the 2018 Asian Games took place on 26 August 2018 at the Jakarta International Expo Hall A.

== Schedule ==
All times are Western Indonesia Time (UTC+07:00)

Date	Time	Event
Sunday, 26 August 2018	14:00	Group A

== Records ==
Prior to this competition, the existing world, Asian and Games records were as follows.

World Record	Snatch	Natalya Zabolotnaya (RUS)	135 kg	Belgorod, Russia	17 December 2011
World Record	Clean & Jerk	Kim Un-ju (PRK)	164 kg	Incheon, South Korea	25 September 2014
World Record	Total	Natalya Zabolotnaya (RUS)	296 kg	Belgorod, Russia	17 December 2011
Asian Record	Snatch	Svetlana Podobedova (KAZ)	134 kg	Antalya, Turkey	23 September 2010
Asian Record	Clean & Jerk	Kim Un-ju (PRK)	164 kg	Incheon, South Korea	25 September 2014
Asian Record	Total	Svetlana Podobedova (KAZ)	295 kg	Antalya, Turkey	23 September 2010
Games Record	Snatch	Kang Yue (CHN)	131 kg	Incheon, South Korea	25 September 2014
Games Record	Clean & Jerk	Kim Un-ju (PRK)	164 kg	Incheon, South Korea	25 September 2014
Games Record	Total	Kim Un-ju (PRK)	292 kg	Incheon, South Korea	25 September 2014

== Results ==
Legend

- NM — No mark

Rank	Athlete	Group	Snatch (kg)				Clean & Jerk (kg)				Total
Rank	Athlete	Group	1	2	3	Result	1	2	3	Result	Total
1st place, gold medalist(s)	Rim Jong-sim (PRK)	A	110	113	116	116	137	142	147	147	263
2nd place, silver medalist(s)	Omadoy Otakuziyeva (UZB)	A	97	101	~~103~~	101	127	131	136	136	237
3rd place, bronze medalist(s)	Mun Min-hee (KOR)	A	~~102~~	102	106	106	123	127	130	130	236
4	Yao Chi-ling (TPE)	A	97	~~101~~	~~101~~	97	127	~~132~~	~~132~~	127	224
5	Ayumi Kamiya (JPN)	A	100	~~103~~	~~103~~	100	118	122	~~127~~	122	222
6	Gülnabat Kadyrowa (TKM)	A	90	~~93~~	93	93	~~115~~	115	118	118	211
7	Huda Salim (IRQ)	A	91	95	~~97~~	95	~~112~~	~~112~~	112	112	207
8	Tara Devi Pun (NEP)	A	70	~~74~~	74	74	93	98	101	101	175
9	Mai Al-Madani (UAE)	A	55	59	~~61~~	59	65	69	73	73	132
—	Aýsoltan Toýçyýewa (TKM)	A	~~88~~	~~88~~	~~88~~	—	—	—	—	—	NM
