= 2011 World Weightlifting Championships – Women's 75 kg =

The women's competition in the heavyweight (– 75 kg) division was held on 10 November 2011.

== Schedule ==
Date	Time	Event
10 November 2011	13:00	Group B
10 November 2011	19:00	Group A

== Medalists ==
Event	Gold		Silver		Bronze	
Snatch	Svetlana Podobedova (KAZ)	131 kg	Nadezhda Evstyukhina (RUS)	130 kg	Iryna Kulesha (BLR)	121 kg
Clean & jerk	Nadezhda Evstyukhina (RUS)	163 kg	Svetlana Podobedova (KAZ)	156 kg	Kim Un-ju (PRK)	151 kg
Total	Nadezhda Evstyukhina (RUS)	293 kg	Svetlana Podobedova (KAZ)	287 kg	Kim Un-ju (PRK)	265 kg

== Records ==
Prior to this competition, the existing world records were as follows.

World record	Snatch	Svetlana Podobedova (KAZ)	134 kg	Antalya, Turkey	22 September 2010
World record	Clean & Jerk	Nadezhda Evstyukhina (RUS)	162 kg	Kazan, Russia	16 April 2011
World record	Total	Svetlana Podobedova (KAZ)	295 kg	Antalya, Turkey	22 September 2010

== Results ==
Rank	Athlete	Group	Body weight	Snatch (kg)				Clean & jerk (kg)				Total
Rank	Athlete	Group	Body weight	1	2	3	Rank	1	2	3	Rank	Total
1st place, gold medalist(s)	Nadezhda Evstyukhina (RUS)	A	74.18	125	130	~~133~~	2nd place, silver medalist(s)	155	158	163	1st place, gold medalist(s)	293
2nd place, silver medalist(s)	Svetlana Podobedova (KAZ)	A	74.84	126	131	~~135~~	1st place, gold medalist(s)	~~156~~	156	~~163~~	2nd place, silver medalist(s)	287
3rd place, bronze medalist(s)	Kim Un-ju (PRK)	A	74.75	105	111	114	6	146	151	~~156~~	3rd place, bronze medalist(s)	265
4	Iryna Kulesha (BLR)	A	74.52	115	119	121	3rd place, bronze medalist(s)	135	140	~~145~~	6	261
5	Lydia Valentín (ESP)	A	74.34	112	117	120	4	133	138	~~142~~	7	258
6	Kang Yue (CHN)	A	72.72	110	116	~~120~~	5	135	~~140~~	~~140~~	9	251
7	Anna Nurmukhambetova (KAZ)	A	73.69	105	110	~~115~~	9	135	~~141~~	141	4	251
8	Svetlana Shimkova (RUS)	A	69.20	110	~~113~~	~~113~~	8	135	140	~~144~~	5	250
9	Abeer Abdelrahman (EGY)	A	74.96	107	112	~~115~~	7	136	~~141~~	~~141~~	8	248
10	Ubaldina Valoyes (COL)	A	73.91	103	107	~~110~~	10	127	~~133~~	133	10	240
11	Juliet Okoebor (NGR)	B	74.36	100	~~102~~	—	12	~~123~~	~~123~~	123	11	223
12	Mary Opeloge (SAM)	A	73.99	~~97~~	97	101	11	121	~~122~~	~~124~~	15	222
13	Kazue Imahoko (JPN)	A	74.65	100	~~104~~	~~104~~	13	117	120	~~123~~	17	220
14	Jeane Lassen (CAN)	B	74.81	92	95	97	17	118	~~123~~	123	12	220
15	Yvonne Kranz (GER)	B	74.85	90	94	97	18	116	120	123	13	220
16	María Álvarez (VEN)	B	73.11	96	99	~~100~~	14	116	118	120	16	219
17	Jaqueline Ferreira (BRA)	B	73.89	92	96	~~100~~	19	115	121	~~123~~	14	217
18	Mandy Wedow (GER)	B	74.72	93	96	98	15	114	117	119	18	217
19	Yarvanis Herrera (VEN)	B	73.62	97	~~100~~	~~100~~	16	115	118	~~120~~	19	215
20	Jenna Myers (AUS)	B	74.19	91	95	~~97~~	20	112	~~117~~	~~117~~	20	207
21	Michaela Detenamo (NRU)	B	74.24	90	~~93~~	~~93~~	21	112	~~116~~	~~116~~	21	202
22	Bianka Bazsó (HUN)	B	70.66	84	88	~~91~~	22	106	~~110~~	~~110~~	22	194
23	Zhang Shaoling (MAC)	B	73.77	65	70	75	24	80	85	90	23	165
—	Martina Szepesi (HUN)	B	74.07	83	87	~~89~~	23	~~107~~	~~107~~	~~107~~	—	—
DQ	Hadiza Zakari (NGR)	B	74.89	~~115~~	~~115~~	115	—	~~125~~	125	—	—	—

== New records ==
Clean & jerk	163 kg	Nadezhda Evstyukhina (RUS)	WR
