= Lydia Valentín =

Spanish weightlifter (born 1985)

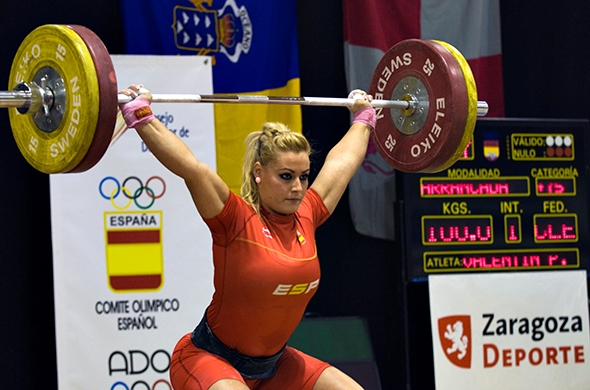
- Valentín in 2008

Personal information
- Full name: Lydia Valentín Pérez
- Nationality: Spanish
- Born: 10 February 1985 (age 41) Ponferrada, Spain
- Years active: 2002–2023
- Height: 1.69 m (5 ft 7 in)
- Weight: 78.80 kg (174 lb)
- Website: LydiaValentin.com

Sport
- Country: Spain
- Sport: Weightlifting
- Event: –81 kg
- Club: Cas-Leonesa, CLE
- Coached by: Matías Fernández

Achievements and titles
- Personal bests: Snatch: 124 kg (2014, Almaty); Clean & jerk: 147 kg (2014, Tel Aviv); Total: 268 kg (2014, Tel Aviv)
Medal record
Women's weightlifting
Representing Spain
Olympic Games
| Gold medal – first place | 2012 London | –75 kg |
| Silver medal – second place | 2008 Beijing | –75 kg |
| Bronze medal – third place | 2016 Rio de Janeiro | –75 kg |
World Championships
| Gold medal – first place | 2017 Anaheim | –75 kg |
| Gold medal – first place | 2018 Ashgabat | –81 kg |
| Silver medal – second place | 2019 Pattaya | –81 kg |
| Bronze medal – third place | 2013 Wrocław | –75 kg |
European Championships
| Gold medal – first place | 2014 Tel Aviv | –75 kg |
| Gold medal – first place | 2015 Tbilisi | –75 kg |
| Gold medal – first place | 2017 Split | –75 kg |
| Gold medal – first place | 2018 Bucharest | –75 kg |
| Silver medal – second place | 2008 Lignano | –75 kg |
| Silver medal – second place | 2009 Bucharest | –75 kg |
| Silver medal – second place | 2012 Antalya | –75 kg |
| Silver medal – second place | 2013 Tirana | –75 kg |
| Silver medal – second place | 2019 Batumi | –76 kg |
| Bronze medal – third place | 2007 Strasbourg | –75 kg |
| Bronze medal – third place | 2010 Minsk | –75 kg |
| Bronze medal – third place | 2011 Kazan | –75 kg |
Mediterranean Games
| Gold medal – first place | 2013 Mersin | -75kg |
| Gold medal – first place | 2018 Tarragona | -75 kg |

Lydia Valentín Pérez (born 10 February 1985) is a Spanish retired weightlifter, Olympic Champion, two-time World Champion and four-time European Champion competing in the 75 kg category until 2018 and 81 kg starting in 2018 after the International Weightlifting Federation reorganized the categories. She has won three Olympic medals (silver in 2008, gold in 2012 and bronze in 2016), two World Weightlifting Championships (2017 and 2018), and four European Weightlifting Championships.

== Career ==
At the 2007 World Championships, she ranked sixth in the 75 kg category with a total of 240 kg.

At the 2013 World Championships, she won bronze in the snatch and placed fourth in the total, being promoted to silver and bronze respectively when Olga Zubova was disqualified for failing a doping test. In 2017, Valentín won the World Weightlifting Championship held in Anaheim, United States.

At the European Championships, she won four gold medals for the total in 2014, 2015, 2017 and 2018 three silver medals (in 2008, 2012 and 2013) and three bronze medals (in 2007, 2009 and 2011), with three gold and four silver medals in the snatch, and two gold, one silver and five bronze medals in the clean and jerk.

=== Olympics ===
In the 75 kg category at the 2008 Summer Olympics, Valentín finished in fifth place with a 250 kg total. In 2016, retests of samples from the 75 kg category at the 2008 Olympics returned positive results for the original gold medalist Cao Lei and bronze medalist Nadezhda Evstyukhina. Both were disqualified, and Valentín was awarded the silver medal.

In 2012, Valentín competed at the 2012 Summer Olympics in the 75 kg category, and finished in fourth place with a 265 kg total, behind the eight new Olympic Records set by Svetlana Podobedova and Natalia Zabolotnaya. In 2016, during retests, all three original medalists returned positive results, thus disqualifying them. Valentín was declared the Olympic Champion, and in March 2019, she was awarded her gold medal.

In 2016, while waiting for confirmation of these medals, Valentín had competed in the 2016 Olympics, where she lifted a total of 257 kg and won the bronze medal. It was, at the time, Spain's first medal ever in weightlifting (retrospectively third).

In 2021, she competed in the women's 87 kg event at the 2020 Summer Olympics in Tokyo, Japan.

== Major results ==
| Year | Venue | Weight | Snatch (kg) | | | | Clean & jerk (kg) | | | | Total | Rank |
| Year | Venue | Weight | 1 | 2 | 3 | Rank | 1 | 2 | 3 | Rank | Total | Rank |
Olympic Games
| 2008 | Beijing, China | 75 kg | ~~110~~ | 110 | 115 | 2 | 130 | 135 | ~~138~~ | 3 | 250 | 2nd place, silver medalist(s) |
| 2012 | London, United Kingdom | 75 kg | ~~115~~ | 115 | 120 | 1 | 140 | 145 | ~~148~~ | 1 | 265 | 1st place, gold medalist(s) |
| 2016 | Rio de Janeiro, Brazil | 75 kg | 112 | ~~116~~ | 116 | 2 | 135 | 138 | 141 | 3 | 257 | 3rd place, bronze medalist(s) |
| 2020 | Tokyo, Japan | 87 kg | 100 | 103 | ~~106~~ | 10 | 122 | – | – | 11 | 225 | 10 |
World Championships
| 2002 | Warsaw, Poland | 63 kg | ~~80~~ | ~~80~~ | ~~80~~ | – | ~~92.5~~ | 92.5 | ~~120~~ | 13 | – | – |
| 2005 | Doha, Qatar | 75 kg | 100 | 105 | ~~107~~ | 7 | ~~115~~ | 115 | ~~120~~ | 13 | 220 | 11 |
| 2006 | Santo Domingo, Dominican Republic | 75 kg | ~~100~~ | ~~100~~ | 100 | 13 | ~~120~~ | ~~120~~ | ~~120~~ | – | – | – |
| 2007 | Chiang Mai, Thailand | 75 kg | 105 | 110 | ~~115~~ | 5 | 125 | 130 | ~~135~~ | 5 | 240 | 6 |
| 2009 | Goyang, South Korea | 75 kg | 112 | ~~118~~ | ~~119~~ | 4 | 130 | ~~136~~ | ~~136~~ | 9 | 242 | 6 |
| 2010 | Antalya, Turkey | 75 kg | ~~112~~ | 112 | ~~117~~ | 6 | ~~135~~ | ~~135~~ | ~~135~~ | – | – | – |
| 2011 | Paris, France | 75 kg | 112 | 117 | 120 | 4 | 133 | 138 | ~~142~~ | 7 | 258 | 5 |
| 2013 | Wrocław, Poland | 75 kg | 117 | ~~122~~ | 122 | 2nd place, silver medalist(s) | 138 | ~~146~~ | ~~146~~ | 3rd place, bronze medalist(s) | 260 | 3rd place, bronze medalist(s) |
| 2014 | Almaty, Kazakhstan | 75 kg | ~~120~~ | 120 | 124 | 3rd place, bronze medalist(s) | 140 | ~~147~~ | ~~148~~ | 4 | 264 | 4 |
| 2015 | Houston, United States | 75 kg | – | – | – | – | – | – | – | – | – | – |
| 2017 | Anaheim, United States | 75 kg | 110 | 115 | 118 | 1st place, gold medalist(s) | 130 | 135 | 140 | 1st place, gold medalist(s) | 258 | 1st place, gold medalist(s) |
| 2018 | Ashgabat, Turkmenistan | 81 kg | 108 | 110 | 113 | 1st place, gold medalist(s) | 130 | ~~136~~ | 136 | 3rd place, bronze medalist(s) | 249 | 1st place, gold medalist(s) |
| 2019 | Pattaya, Thailand | 81 kg | 105 | 108 | ~~112~~ | 5 | 130 | 134 | 138 | 3rd place, bronze medalist(s) | 246 | 2nd place, silver medalist(s) |
European Championships
| 2005 | Sofia, Bulgaria | 75 kg | ~~100~~ | 100 | ~~105~~ | 6 | 110 | 115 | ~~120~~ | 7 | 215 | 6 |
| 2006 | Władysławowo, Poland | 75 kg | ~~103~~ | 103 | ~~108~~ | 5 | 118 | 122 | ~~125~~ | 7 | 225 | 7 |
| 2007 | Strasbourg, France | 75 kg | 105 | 110 | 115 | 2nd place, silver medalist(s) | 125 | 130 | 132 | 4 | 247 | 3rd place, bronze medalist(s) |
| 2008 | Lignano Sabbiadoro, Italy | 75 kg | 110 | 115 | ~~118~~ | 2nd place, silver medalist(s) | 130 | ~~135~~ | ~~135~~ | 3rd place, bronze medalist(s) | 245 | 2nd place, silver medalist(s) |
| 2009 | Bucharest, Romania | 75 kg | 112 | 117 | 120 | 1st place, gold medalist(s) | ~~132~~ | ~~132~~ | 132 | 2nd place, silver medalist(s) | 252 | 2nd place, silver medalist(s) |
| 2010 | Minsk, Belarus | 75 kg | 110 | ~~115~~ | 115 | 3rd place, bronze medalist(s) | 132 | 137 | 140 | 3rd place, bronze medalist(s) | 255 | 3rd place, bronze medalist(s) |
| 2011 | Kazan, Russia | 75 kg | 112 | 117 | 122 | 3rd place, bronze medalist(s) | 132 | 142 | ~~146~~ | 3rd place, bronze medalist(s) | 264 | 3rd place, bronze medalist(s) |
| 2012 | Antalya, Turkey | 75 kg | 112 | 117 | ~~123~~ | 1st place, gold medalist(s) | 135 | 143 | ~~146~~ | 2nd place, silver medalist(s) | 260 | 2nd place, silver medalist(s) |
| 2013 | Tirana, Albania | 75 kg | 115 | 120 | ~~124~~ | 2nd place, silver medalist(s) | 135 | 140 | ~~142~~ | 2nd place, silver medalist(s) | 260 | 2nd place, silver medalist(s) |
| 2014 | Tel Aviv, Israel | 75 kg | 115 | 120 | 121 | 1st place, gold medalist(s) | 137 | 144 | 147 | 1st place, gold medalist(s) | 268 | 1st place, gold medalist(s) |
| 2015 | (Georgia (country)) Tbilisi, Georgia | 75 kg | 112 | ~~116~~ | 118 | 1st place, gold medalist(s) | 135 | 141 | 145 | 1st place, gold medalist(s) | 263 | 1st place, gold medalist(s) |
| 2017 | Split, Croatia | 75 kg | 112 | 115 | ~~118~~ | 2nd place, silver medalist(s) | 132 | 137 | – | 1st place, gold medalist(s) | 252 | 1st place, gold medalist(s) |
| 2018 | Bucharest, Romania | 75 kg | 107 | 112 | 115 | 1st place, gold medalist(s) | 130 | 135 | ~~140~~ | 1st place, gold medalist(s) | 250 | 1st place, gold medalist(s) |
| 2019 | (Georgia (country)) Batumi, Georgia | 76 kg | 105 | 108 | ~~110~~ | 1st place, gold medalist(s) | 130 | 133 | ~~136~~ | 2nd place, silver medalist(s) | 241 | 2nd place, silver medalist(s) |
Mediterranean Games
| 2013 | Mersin, Turkey | 75 kg | 112 | 115 | 120 | 1st place, gold medalist(s) | 135 | 140 | 145 | 1st place, gold medalist(s) | 265 | – |
| 2018 | Tarragona, Spain | 75 kg | 105 | 110 | 112 | 1st place, gold medalist(s) | 130 | 137 | -- | 1st place, gold medalist(s) | 249 | – |

== See also ==
- List of Olympic medalists in weightlifting
- List of World Championships medalists in weightlifting
- List of European Championships medalists in weightlifting
