= 2014 World Weightlifting Championships – Women's 75 kg =

Weightlifting event

The women's 75 kilograms event at the 2014 World Weightlifting Championships was held on 14–15 November 2014 in Baluan Sholak Sports Palace, Almaty, Kazakhstan.

== Schedule ==
Date	Time	Event
14 November 2014	21:00	Group C
15 November 2014	13:00	Group B
15 November 2014	16:00	Group A

== Medalists ==
Event	Gold		Silver		Bronze	
Snatch	Nadezhda Evstyukhina (RUS)	126 kg	Kang Yue (CHN)	126 kg	Lydia Valentín (ESP)	124 kg
Clean & Jerk	Rim Jong-sim (PRK)	153 kg	Nadezhda Evstyukhina (RUS)	153 kg	Kang Yue (CHN)	151 kg
Total	Nadezhda Evstyukhina (RUS)	279 kg	Kang Yue (CHN)	277 kg	Rim Jong-sim (PRK)	276 kg

== Records ==
Prior to this competition, the existing world records were as follows.

World Record	Snatch	Natalya Zabolotnaya (RUS)	135 kg	Belgorod, Russia	17 December 2011
World Record	Clean & Jerk	Kim Un-ju (PRK)	164 kg	Incheon, South Korea	25 September 2014
World Record	Total	Natalya Zabolotnaya (RUS)	296 kg	Belgorod, Russia	17 December 2011

== Results ==
Rank	Athlete	Group	Body weight	Snatch (kg)				Clean & Jerk (kg)				Total
Rank	Athlete	Group	Body weight	1	2	3	Rank	1	2	3	Rank	Total
1st place, gold medalist(s)	Nadezhda Evstyukhina (RUS)	A	74.40	123	~~126~~	126	1st place, gold medalist(s)	~~153~~	~~153~~	153	2nd place, silver medalist(s)	279
2nd place, silver medalist(s)	Kang Yue (CHN)	A	74.51	~~126~~	~~126~~	126	2nd place, silver medalist(s)	151	~~155~~	~~155~~	3rd place, bronze medalist(s)	277
3rd place, bronze medalist(s)	Rim Jong-sim (PRK)	A	73.34	115	120	123	4	147	153	~~156~~	1st place, gold medalist(s)	276
4	Lydia Valentín (ESP)	A	73.79	~~120~~	120	124	3rd place, bronze medalist(s)	140	~~147~~	~~148~~	4	264
5	Anna Nurmukhambetova (KAZ)	A	74.60	105	110	115	5	125	130	135	6	250
6	Ubaldina Valoyes (COL)	A	74.10	~~105~~	105	110	7	132	135	~~137~~	5	245
7	Gaëlle Nayo-Ketchanke (FRA)	A	73.35	100	104	107	8	125	~~131~~	131	8	238
8	Natalia Prișcepa (MDA)	A	74.79	104	108	111	6	~~127~~	~~127~~	127	10	238
9	Marie-Ève Beauchemin-Nadeau (CAN)	A	74.90	~~102~~	102	~~107~~	9	~~133~~	133	~~137~~	7	235
10	Jaqueline Ferreira (BRA)	B	74.10	100	~~105~~	~~105~~	13	120	125	130	9	230
11	Yao Chi-ling (TPE)	A	74.59	97	~~101~~	101	11	125	~~130~~	~~130~~	12	226
12	Aksana Yermolenka (BLR)	B	74.04	~~95~~	95	100	12	117	122	125	11	225
13	María Fernanda Valdés (CHI)	B	75.00	94	~~98~~	~~98~~	17	~~120~~	120	125	13	219
14	Mileidy Albarrán (VEN)	B	73.64	92	97	~~100~~	14	114	120	~~123~~	15	217
15	Prabdeep Kaur Sanghera (CAN)	C	73.24	96	99	101	10	115	~~118~~	~~118~~	19	216
16	Yvonne Kranz (GER)	B	74.98	87	~~90~~	90	23	115	119	121	14	211
17	Alejandra Garza (MEX)	B	73.62	90	94	~~97~~	15	113	116	~~120~~	16	210
18	Mercy Brown (GBR)	C	74.73	89	92	94	16	111	~~116~~	116	18	210
19	Manami Fujita (JPN)	B	74.36	89	92	~~95~~	21	108	112	116	17	208
20	Nina Schroth (GER)	B	74.27	92	~~96~~	~~96~~	20	109	113	~~116~~	21	205
21	Bianka Bazsó (HUN)	C	74.08	85	90	~~93~~	22	107	111	114	20	204
22	Kavita Devi (IND)	C	73.90	~~85~~	85	89	24	109	~~114~~	~~115~~	22	198
23	Kylie Lindbeck (AUS)	C	74.08	~~90~~	90	93	18	105	~~110~~	~~110~~	23	198
24	Carlotta Brunelli (ITA)	C	74.63	90	93	~~95~~	19	~~103~~	103	~~110~~	24	196
25	Nicol Matamala (CHI)	C	74.84	77	82	86	25	98	~~102~~	~~102~~	25	184
DQ	Kim Un-ju (PRK)	A	74.63	120	126	~~127~~	—	154	~~157~~	157	—	—
