= 2010 World Weightlifting Championships – Women's 69 kg =

The women's competition in the light-heavyweight (– 69 kg) division was held on 21 and 22 September 2010.

== Schedule ==
Date	Time	Event
21 September 2010	12:00	Group C
22 September 2010	17:00	Group B
22 September 2010	20:00	Group A

== Medalists ==
Event	Gold		Silver		Bronze	
Snatch	Svetlana Shimkova (RUS)	116 kg	Kang Yue (CHN)	113 kg	Meline Daluzyan (ARM)	112 kg
Clean & Jerk	Svetlana Shimkova (RUS)	140 kg	Kang Yue (CHN)	140 kg	Meline Daluzyan (ARM)	139 kg
Total	Svetlana Shimkova (RUS)	256 kg	Kang Yue (CHN)	253 kg	Meline Daluzyan (ARM)	251 kg

== Records ==
Prior to this competition, the existing world records were as follows.

World Record	Snatch	~~Liu Chunhong (CHN)~~; Oxana Slivenko (RUS)	~~128 kg~~ 123 kg	~~Beijing, China~~; Santo Domingo, Dominican	~~13 August 2008~~; 4 October 2006
World Record	Clean & Jerk	~~Liu Chunhong (CHN)~~; Zarema Kasaeva (RUS)	~~158 kg~~ 157 kg	~~Beijing, China~~; Doha, Qatar	~~13 August 2008~~; 13 November 2005
World Record	Total	~~Liu Chunhong (CHN)~~; Oxana Slivenko (RUS)	~~286 kg~~ 276 kg	~~Beijing, China~~; Chiang Mai, Thailand	~~13 August 2008~~; 24 September 2007

- Liu Chunhong's world records were rescinded in 2017.

== Results ==
Rank	Athlete	Group	Body weight	Snatch (kg)				Clean & Jerk (kg)				Total
Rank	Athlete	Group	Body weight	1	2	3	Rank	1	2	3	Rank	Total
1st place, gold medalist(s)	Svetlana Shimkova (RUS)	A	68.23	108	112	116	1st place, gold medalist(s)	135	~~140~~	140	1st place, gold medalist(s)	256
2nd place, silver medalist(s)	Kang Yue (CHN)	A	68.26	105	~~113~~	113	2nd place, silver medalist(s)	~~130~~	130	140	2nd place, silver medalist(s)	253
3rd place, bronze medalist(s)	Meline Daluzyan (ARM)	A	67.32	108	112	~~115~~	3rd place, bronze medalist(s)	134	~~139~~	139	3rd place, bronze medalist(s)	251
4	Zhang Shaoling (MAC)	A	68.72	106	~~109~~	~~109~~	4	130	~~136~~	137	4	243
5	Leydi Solís (COL)	A	68.42	105	~~109~~	~~109~~	5	130	133	136	5	241
6	Sinta Darmariani (INA)	A	68.25	97	~~100~~	100	10	128	132	~~135~~	6	232
7	Christine Girard (CAN)	B	68.70	97	101	104	6	127	~~132~~	~~132~~	7	231
8	Esmat Mansour (EGY)	A	64.85	96	100	103	7	120	124	~~128~~	10	227
9	Nguyễn Thị Phương Loan (VIE)	A	67.94	95	100	~~105~~	9	120	~~125~~	125	8	225
10	Olga Zubova (RUS)	B	68.40	90	95	98	12	115	120	125	9	223
11	Ewa Mizdal (POL)	A	68.64	93	95	97	13	~~118~~	118	124	11	221
12	Eszter Krutzler (HUN)	B	68.68	97	101	~~104~~	8	~~120~~	120	~~125~~	13	221
13	Anna Nurmukhambetova (KAZ)	B	68.52	95	~~100~~	100	11	120	~~124~~	~~124~~	12	220
14	Beti Feriyani (INA)	B	68.27	96	~~101~~	~~101~~	14	116	~~121~~	~~125~~	15	212
15	Ayano Tani (JPN)	B	68.78	~~89~~	89	92	19	117	120	~~123~~	14	212
16	Solenny Villasmil (VEN)	B	64.24	89	~~93~~	93	16	110	~~113~~	113	18	206
17	Liliane Menezes (BRA)	C	68.27	~~90~~	90	92	18	110	114	~~120~~	17	206
18	Natasha Perdue (GBR)	C	68.17	90	~~93~~	95	15	~~110~~	110	~~113~~	23	205
19	Danica Rue (USA)	B	68.49	90	~~93~~	~~93~~	20	112	115	~~117~~	16	205
20	Anna Leśniewska (POL)	B	65.66	87	89	~~90~~	22	110	113	~~116~~	19	202
21	Rosa Tenorio (ECU)	B	67.96	88	~~92~~	92	17	~~107~~	110	~~114~~	22	202
22	Anett Goppold (GER)	B	68.53	87	~~90~~	90	21	108	110	112	20	202
23	Valérie Lefebvre (CAN)	C	67.86	86	89	~~91~~	23	110	~~113~~	~~113~~	21	199
24	Bianka Bazsó (HUN)	C	65.99	80	85	88	24	103	108	~~111~~	24	196
25	Raquel Alonso (ESP)	C	68.65	80	85	88	25	103	108	~~111~~	25	196
26	Lu Ying-chi (TPE)	C	67.09	80	~~85~~	85	26	100	105	—	26	190
27	Pavla Kladivová (CZE)	C	68.44	~~84~~	84	~~88~~	27	103	~~108~~	~~109~~	27	187
—	Norma Figueroa (PUR)	C	68.93	~~86~~	86	~~90~~	—	110	115	~~120~~	—	—
