= Weightlifting at the 2018 Commonwealth Games – Women's 75 kg =

Weightlifting – Women's 75 kg at the 2018 Commonwealth Games
- Venue: Carrara Sports and Leisure Centre
- Dates: 8 April 2018
- Competitors: 12 from 12 nations
- Winning total weight: 222

Medalists
gold medal	Emily Godley	England
silver medal	Marie-Ève Beauchemin-Nadeau	Canada
bronze medal	Laura Hughes	Wales

The Women's 75 kg weightlifting event at the 2018 Commonwealth Games took place at the Carrara Sports and Leisure Centre on 8 April 2018. The weightlifter from England won the gold, with a combined lift of 222 kg.

== Records ==
Prior to this competition, the existing world, Commonwealth and Games records were as follows:

World record	Snatch	Natalia Zabolotnaya (RUS)	135 kg	Belgorod, Russia	17 December 2011
World record	Clean & Jerk	Kim Un-ju (PRK)	164 kg	Incheon, South Korea	25 September 2014
World record	Total	Natalia Zabolotnaya (RUS)	296 kg	Belgorod, Russia	17 December 2011
Commonwealth record	Snatch	Madias Nzesso (CMR)	115 kg	London, England	3 August 2012
Commonwealth record	Clean & Jerk	Ruth Ogbeifo (NGR)	140 kg	Sydney, Australia	20 September 2000
Commonwealth record	Total	Marie-Ève Beauchemin-Nadeau (CAN)	250 kg	Glasgow, Scotland	29 July 2014
Games record	Snatch	Hadiza Zakari (NGR)	110 kg	New Delhi, India	9 October 2010
Games record	Clean & Jerk	Marie-Ève Beauchemin-Nadeau (CAN)	140 kg	Glasgow, Scotland	29 July 2014
Games record	Total	Marie-Ève Beauchemin-Nadeau (CAN)	250 kg	Glasgow, Scotland	29 July 2014

== Schedule ==
All times are Australian Eastern Standard Time (UTC+10)

Date	Time	Round
Saturday, 8 April 2018	18:42	Final

== Results ==
Rank	Athlete	Body weight (kg)	Snatch (kg)				Clean & Jerk (kg)				Total
Rank	Athlete	Body weight (kg)	1	2	3	Result	1	2	3	Result	Total
1st place, gold medalist(s)	Emily Godley (ENG)	70.97	91	94	96	96	119	124	126	126	222
2nd place, silver medalist(s)	Marie-Ève Beauchemin-Nadeau (CAN)	74.84	~~92~~	92	95	95	121	~~126~~	126	126	221
3rd place, bronze medalist(s)	Laura Hughes (WAL)	74.89	~~88~~	88	91	91	112	116	~~120~~	116	207
4	Bailey Rogers (NZL)	73.72	~~88~~	~~88~~	88	88	~~112~~	112	116	116	204
5	Stephanie Davies (AUS)	72.92	~~87~~	~~87~~	87	87	110	~~118~~	~~118~~	110	197
6	Seema (IND)	74.67	80	~~84~~	84	84	100	105	~~108~~	105	189
7	Rayen Cupid (SVG)	72.80	~~84~~	84	~~86~~	84	101	103	~~105~~	103	187
8	Jabriella Teo Samuel (MAS)	74.24	78	81	~~84~~	81	100	103	~~106~~	103	184
9	Chathurika Priyanthi Balage (SRI)	73.62	75	~~80~~	~~80~~	75	100	~~104~~	~~104~~	100	175
10	Philippa Woonton (COK)	74.46	~~75~~	75	~~78~~	75	~~93~~	93	~~97~~	93	168
11	Alison Sunee (MRI)	70.86	~~68~~	68	~~73~~	68	85	90	~~94~~	90	158
12	Juhora Khaton Nisha (BAN)	74.68	~~65~~	~~65~~	65	65	85	90	~~92~~	90	155
