= List of Icelandic records in Olympic weightlifting =

The following are the national records in Olympic weightlifting in Iceland. Records are maintained in each weight class for the snatch lift, clean and jerk lift, and the total for both lifts by the Lyftingasamband Íslands (LSÍ).

== Current records ==
Key to tables: Awaiting ratification Not ratified or later rescinded by LSÍ

=== Men ===
Event	Record	Athlete	Date	Meet	Place	Ref
60 kg
Snatch	101 kg	Standard				
Clean & Jerk	124 kg	Standard				
Total	225 kg	Standard				
65 kg
Snatch	112 kg	Standard				
Clean & Jerk	138 kg	Standard				
Total	250 kg	Standard				
70 kg
Snatch	118 kg	Standard				
Clean & Jerk	145 kg	Standard				
Total	263 kg	Standard				
75 kg
Snatch	123 kg	Standard				
Clean & Jerk	151 kg	Standard				
Total	274 kg	Standard				
85 kg
Snatch	135 kg	Bergur Sverrisson	2 November 2026	World Championships	Ningbo, China	
Clean & Jerk	161 kg	Standard				
Total	293 kg	Bergur Sverrisson	2 November 2026	World Championships	Ningbo, China	
95 kg
Snatch	136 kg	Standard				
Clean & Jerk	169 kg	Standard				
Total	305 kg	Standard				
110 kg
Snatch	148 kg	Þórbergur Ernir Hlynsson	19 October 2026	European U23 Championships	Durrës, Albania	
Clean & Jerk	180 kg	Þórbergur Ernir Hlynsson	7 February 2026	Icelandic Championships	Mosfellsbær, Iceland	
Total	326 kg	Þórbergur Ernir Hlynsson	19 October 2026	European U23 Championships	Durrës, Albania	
+110 kg
Snatch	147 kg	Standard				
Clean & Jerk	183 kg	Standard				
Total	330 kg	Standard				

=== Women ===
Event	Record	Athlete	Date	Meet	Place	Ref
49 kg
Snatch	72 kg	Standard				
Clean & Jerk	89 kg	Standard				
Total	161 kg	Standard				
53 kg
Snatch	79 kg	Standard				
Clean & Jerk	100 kg	Standard				
Total	179 kg	Standard				
57 kg
Snatch	84 kg	Standard				
Clean & Jerk	104 kg	Standard				
Total	188 kg	Standard				
61 kg
Snatch	88 kg	Standard				
Clean & Jerk	107 kg	Standard				
Total	195 kg	Standard				
69 kg
Snatch	97 kg	Guðný Björk Stefánsdóttir	22 April 2026	European Championships	Batumi, Georgia	
Clean & Jerk	116 kg	Guðný Björk Stefánsdóttir	22 April 2026	European Championships	Batumi, Georgia	
Total	213 kg	Guðný Björk Stefánsdóttir	22 April 2026	European Championships	Batumi, Georgia	
77 kg
Snatch	98 kg	Guðný Björk Stefánsdóttir	15 November 2025	Nordic Championships	Garðabær, Iceland	
Clean & Jerk	119 kg	Standard				
Total	216 kg	Standard				
86 kg
Snatch	101 kg	Standard				
Clean & Jerk	123 kg	Standard				
Total	224 kg	Standard				
+86 kg
Snatch	106 kg	Erla Ágústsdóttir	11 October 2025	World Championships	Førde, Norway	
Clean & Jerk	128 kg	Friðný Jónsdóttir	7 February 2026	Icelandic Championships	Mosfellsbær, Iceland	
Total	230 kg	Erla Ágústsdóttir	25 April 2026	European Championships	Batumi, Georgia	

== Historical records ==
=== Men (2025–2026) ===
Event	Record	Athlete	Date	Meet	Place	Ref
71 kg
Snatch	119 kg	Standard				
Clean & Jerk	147 kg	Standard				
Total	266 kg	Standard				
79 kg
Snatch	127 kg	Standard				
Clean & Jerk	156 kg	Standard				
Total	283 kg	Standard				
88 kg
Snatch	138 kg	Bergur Sverrisson	24 May 2026	LSÍ Summer Tournament	Akureyri, Iceland	
Clean & Jerk	164 kg	Standard				
Total	297 kg	Standard				
94 kg
Snatch	136 kg	Standard				
Clean & Jerk	169 kg	Standard				
Total	305 kg	Standard				

=== Men (1998–2018) ===
Event	Record	Athlete	Date	Meet	Place	Ref
–56 kg
Snatch	58 kg	Einar Ísberg	9 September 2017	Icelandic Youth Championships	Reykjavík, Iceland	
Clean & Jerk	74 kg	Einar Ísberg	9 September 2017	Icelandic Youth Championships	Reykjavík, Iceland	
Total	132 kg	Einar Ísberg	9 September 2017	Icelandic Youth Championships	Reykjavík, Iceland	
–62 kg
Snatch	72 kg	Matthías Abel Einarsson	16 December 2017	Christmas Tournament	Reykjavík, Iceland	
Clean & Jerk	91 kg	Matthías Abel Einarsson	16 December 2017	Christmas Tournament	Reykjavík, Iceland	
Total	163 kg	Matthías Abel Einarsson	16 December 2017	Christmas Tournament	Reykjavík, Iceland	
–69 kg
Snatch	113 kg	Einar Ingi Jónsson	December 2016	European Junior Championships	Eilat, Israel	
Clean & Jerk	143 kg	Einar Ingi Jónsson	1 October 2016	Nordic Championships	Rovaniemi, Finland	
Total	253 kg	Einar Ingi Jónsson	1 October 2016	Nordic Championships	Rovaniemi, Finland	
–77 kg
Snatch	123 kg	Einar Ingi Jónsson	29 March 2018	European Championships	Bucharest, Romania	
Clean & Jerk	152 kg	Einar Ingi Jónsson	16 December 2017	Christmas Tournament	Reykjavík, Iceland	
Total	273 kg	Einar Ingi Jónsson	29 March 2018	European Championships	Bucharest, Romania	
–85 kg
Snatch	128 kg	Björgvin Karl Guðmundsson	29 January 2017	Reykjavík International Games	Reykjavík, Iceland	
Clean & Jerk	157 kg	Björgvin Karl Guðmundsson	29 January 2017	Reykjavík International Games	Reykjavík, Iceland	
Total	285 kg	Björgvin Karl Guðmundsson	29 January 2017	Reykjavík International Games	Reykjavík, Iceland	
–94 kg
Snatch	137 kg	Bjarmi Hreinsson	28 January 2018	Reykjavík International Games	Reykjavík, Iceland	
Clean & Jerk	161 kg	Bjarmi Hreinsson	17 February 2018	Icelandic Championships	Mosfellsbær, Iceland	
Total	295 kg	Bjarmi Hreinsson	28 January 2018	Reykjavík International Games	Reykjavík, Iceland	
–105 kg
Snatch	150 kg	Gísli Kristjánsson	5 October 2003	Nordic Championships	Uppsala, Sweden	
Clean & Jerk	175 kg	Gísli Kristjánsson	5 October 2003	Nordic Championships	Uppsala, Sweden	
Total	325 kg	Gísli Kristjánsson	5 October 2003	Nordic Championships	Uppsala, Sweden	
+105 kg
Snatch	160 kg	Andri Gunnarsson	19 February 2017	Icelandic Championships	Mosfellsbær, Iceland	
Clean & Jerk	195 kg	Andri Gunnarsson	19 February 2017	Icelandic Championships	Mosfellsbær, Iceland	
Total	355 kg	Andri Gunnarsson	19 February 2017	Icelandic Championships	Mosfellsbær, Iceland	

=== Men (2018–2025) ===
Event	Record	Athlete	Date	Meet	Place	Ref
55 kg
Snatch	82 kg	Standard				
Clean & Jerk	99 kg	Standard				
Total	181 kg	Standard				
61 kg
Snatch	92 kg	Standard				
Clean & Jerk	110 kg	Standard				
Total	202 kg	Standard				
67 kg
Snatch	100 kg	Standard				
Clean & Jerk	125 kg	Standard				
Total	225 kg	Standard				
73 kg
Snatch	117 kg	Árni Rúnar Baldursson	18 May 2019		Reykjavík, Iceland	
Clean & Jerk	150 kg	Einar Ingi Jónsson	26 January 2020	Reykjavík International Games	Reykjavík, Iceland	
Total	266 kg	Einar Ingi Jónsson	26 January 2020	Reykjavík International Games	Reykjavík, Iceland	
81 kg
Snatch	132 kg	Brynjar Logi Halldórsson	12 May 2024	Icelandic Championships	Akranes, Iceland	
Clean & Jerk	155 kg	Kári Einarsson	16 November 2024		Falköping, Sweden	
Total	286 kg	Brynjar Logi Halldórsson	12 May 2024	Icelandic Championships	Akranes, Iceland	
89 kg
Snatch	140 kg	Bergur Sverrisson	14 December 2024	LSÍ Christmas Tournament	Reykjavík, Iceland	
Clean & Jerk	165 kg	Brynjar Logi Halldórsson	22 March 2024	European Small Nations Championships	Monaco	
Total	302 kg	Bergur Sverrisson	18 April 2025	European Championships	Chișinău, Moldova	
96 kg
Snatch	135 kg	Þórbergur Ernir Hlynsson	7 September 2024	LSÍ Autumn Tournament	Akranes, Iceland	
Clean & Jerk	166 kg	Þórbergur Ernir Hlynsson	7 September 2024	LSÍ Autumn Tournament	Akranes, Iceland	
Total	301 kg	Þórbergur Ernir Hlynsson	7 September 2024	LSÍ Autumn Tournament	Akranes, Iceland	
102 kg
Snatch	140 kg	Þórbergur Ernir Hlynsson	4 May 2025	World Junior Championships	Lima, Peru	
Clean & Jerk	172 kg	Þórbergur Ernir Hlynsson	8 February 2025	Icelandic Championships	Hafnarfjörður, Iceland	
Total	307 kg	Þórbergur Ernir Hlynsson	8 February 2025	Icelandic Championships	Hafnarfjörður, Iceland	
109 kg
Snatch	136 kg	Bjarmi Hreinsson	12 October 2019	Nordic Championships	Vigrestad, Norway	
Clean & Jerk	175 kg	Ingólfur Þór Ævarsson	27 January 2019	Reykjavík International Games	Reykjavík, Iceland	
Total	307 kg	Ingólfur Þór Ævarsson	27 January 2019	Reykjavík International Games	Reykjavík, Iceland	
+109 kg
Snatch	141 kg	Standard				
Clean & Jerk	173 kg	Standard				
Total	314 kg	Standard				

=== Women (2025–2026) ===
Event	Record	Athlete	Date	Meet	Place	Ref
48 kg
Snatch	70 kg	Standard				
Clean & Jerk	89 kg	Standard				
Total	159 kg	Standard				
58 kg
Snatch	85 kg	Standard				
Clean & Jerk	105 kg	Standard				
Total	190 kg	Standard				
63 kg
Snatch	89 kg	Standard				
Clean & Jerk	109 kg	Standard				
Total	198 kg	Standard				

=== Women (2018–2025) ===
Event	Record	Athlete	Date	Meet	Place	Ref
45 kg
Snatch	54 kg	Standard				
Clean & Jerk	64 kg	Standard				
Total	118 kg	Standard				
49 kg
Snatch	60 kg	Standard				
Clean & Jerk	71 kg	Standard				
Total	131 kg	Standard				
55 kg
Snatch	69 kg	Standard				
Clean & Jerk	85 kg	Standard				
Total	154 kg	Standard				
59 kg
Snatch	87 kg	Þuríður Erla Helgadóttir	8 April 2019	European Championships	Batumi, Georgia	
Clean & Jerk	108 kg	Þuríður Erla Helgadóttir	5 April 2021	European Championships	Moscow, Russia	
Total	191 kg	Þuríður Erla Helgadóttir	5 April 2021	European Championships	Moscow, Russia	
64 kg
Snatch	88 kg	Katla Björk Ketilsdóttir	31 May 2022	European Championships	Tirana, Albania	
Clean & Jerk	107 kg	Íris Rut Jónsdóttir	18 March 2023	Icelandic Championships	Mosfellsbær, Iceland	
Total	194 kg	Katla Björk Ketilsdóttir	31 May 2022	European Championships	Tirana, Albania	
71 kg
Snatch	109 kg	Eygló Fanndal Sturludóttir	17 April 2025	European Championships	Chișinău, Moldova	
Clean & Jerk	135 kg	Eygló Fanndal Sturludóttir	17 April 2025	European Championships	Chișinău, Moldova	
Total	244 kg	Eygló Fanndal Sturludóttir	17 April 2025	European Championships	Chișinău, Moldova	
76 kg
Snatch	106 kg	Eygló Fanndal Sturludóttir	22 March 2025	European Small Nations Weightlifting Tournament	Marsa, Malta	
Clean & Jerk	130 kg	Guðný Björk Stefánsdóttir	22 March 2025	European Small Nations Weightlifting Tournament	Marsa, Malta	
Total	236 kg	Guðný Björk Stefánsdóttir	22 March 2025	European Small Nations Weightlifting Tournament	Marsa, Malta	
81 kg
Snatch	88 kg	Standard				
Clean & Jerk	111 kg	Standard				
Total	199 kg	Standard				
87 kg
Snatch	92 kg	Friðný Jónsdóttir	18 March 2023	Icelandic Championships	Mosfellsbær, Iceland	
Clean & Jerk	114 kg	Standard				
Total	205 kg	Standard				
+87 kg
Snatch	102 kg	Erla Ágústsdóttir	15 December 2024	World Championships	Manama, Bahrain	
Clean & Jerk	122 kg	Friðný Jónsdóttir	15 December 2024	LSÍ Christmas Tournament	Reykjavík, Iceland	
Total	222 kg	Erla Ágústsdóttir	15 December 2024	LSÍ Christmas Tournament	Reykjavík, Iceland	

=== Women (1998–2018) ===
Event	Record	Athlete	Date	Meet	Place	Ref
–48 kg
Snatch	50 kg	Birna Dís Ólafsdóttir	17 October 2015		Hveragerði, Iceland	
Clean & Jerk	65 kg	Birna Dís Ólafsdóttir	17 October 2015		Hveragerði, Iceland	
Total	115 kg	Birna Dís Ólafsdóttir	17 October 2015		Hveragerði, Iceland	
–53 kg
Snatch	66 kg	Birna Blöndal Sveinsdóttir	29 January 2017	Reykjavík International Games	Reykjavík, Iceland	
Clean & Jerk	84 kg	Birna Blöndal Sveinsdóttir	29 September 2018	Nordic Championships	Hveragerði, Iceland	
Total	150 kg	Birna Blöndal Sveinsdóttir	29 September 2018	Nordic Championships	Hveragerði, Iceland	
–58 kg
Snatch	86 kg	Þuríður Helgadóttir	29 November 2017	World Championships	Anaheim, United States	
Clean & Jerk	108 kg	Þuríður Helgadóttir	29 November 2017	World Championships	Anaheim, United States	
Total	194 kg	Þuríður Helgadóttir	29 November 2017	World Championships	Anaheim, United States	
–63 kg
Snatch	85 kg	Bjork Odinsddóttir	30 November 2017	World Championships	Anaheim, United States	
Clean & Jerk	109 kg	Bjork Odinsddóttir	30 November 2017	World Championships	Anaheim, United States	
Total	194 kg	Bjork Odinsddóttir	30 November 2017	World Championships	Anaheim, United States	
–69 kg
Snatch	91 kg	Ragnheiður Sara Sigmundsdóttir	29 January 2017	Reykjavík International Games	Reykjavík, Iceland	
Clean & Jerk	110 kg	Ragnheiður Sara Sigmundsdóttir	29 January 2017	Reykjavík International Games	Reykjavík, Iceland	
Total	201 kg	Ragnheiður Sara Sigmundsdóttir	29 January 2017	Reykjavík International Games	Reykjavík, Iceland	
–75 kg
Snatch	83 kg	Freyja Mist Ólafsdóttir	December 2016	European Junior Championships	Eilat, Israel	
Clean & Jerk	107 kg	Sólveig Sigurðardóttir	20 October 2017	Israel-Iceland Team Competition	Tel Aviv, Israel	
Total	189 kg	Sólveig Sigurðardóttir	20 October 2017	Israel-Iceland Team Competition	Tel Aviv, Israel	
–90 kg
Snatch	92 kg	Freyja Mist Ólafsdóttir	9 September 2017	Icelandic U23 Championships	Reykjavík, Iceland	
Clean & Jerk	106 kg	Freyja Mist Ólafsdóttir	6 August 2016	Icelandic Junior Championships	Hafnarfjörður, Iceland	
Total	196 kg	Freyja Mist Ólafsdóttir	9 September 2017	Icelandic U23 Championships	Reykjavík, Iceland	
+90 kg
Snatch	80 kg	Standard				
Clean & Jerk	100 kg	Standard				
Total	180 kg	Standard				
