= 2018 World Weightlifting Championships – Women's 81 kg =

The women's 81 kilograms competition at the 2018 World Weightlifting Championships was held on 8 November 2018.

== Schedule ==
Date	Time	Event
8 November 2018	14:25	Group B
8 November 2018	17:25	Group A

== Medalists ==
Event	Gold		Silver		Bronze	
Snatch	Lydia Valentín (ESP)	113 kg	Raushan Meshitkhanova (KAZ)	108 kg	Darya Naumava (BLR)	108 kg
Clean & Jerk	Darya Naumava (BLR)	137 kg	Tamara Salazar (ECU)	137 kg	Lydia Valentín (ESP)	136 kg
Total	Lydia Valentín (ESP)	249 kg	Darya Naumava (BLR)	245 kg	Tamara Salazar (ECU)	242 kg

== Records ==
Prior to this competition, the existing world records were as follows.

World Record	Snatch	World Standard	127 kg	—	1 November 2018
World Record	Clean & Jerk	World Standard	158 kg	—	1 November 2018
World Record	Total	World Standard	283 kg	—	1 November 2018

== Results ==
Rank	Athlete	Group	Snatch (kg)				Clean & Jerk (kg)				Total
Rank	Athlete	Group	1	2	3	Rank	1	2	3	Rank	Total
1st place, gold medalist(s)	Lydia Valentín (ESP)	A	108	110	113	1st place, gold medalist(s)	130	~~136~~	136	3rd place, bronze medalist(s)	249
2nd place, silver medalist(s)	Darya Naumava (BLR)	A	100	105	108	3rd place, bronze medalist(s)	130	135	137	1st place, gold medalist(s)	245
3rd place, bronze medalist(s)	Tamara Salazar (ECU)	A	101	105	~~107~~	5	133	~~136~~	137	2nd place, silver medalist(s)	242
4	Jenny Arthur (USA)	A	102	104	106	4	130	135	~~138~~	4	241
5	Dayana Chirinos (VEN)	A	100	~~104~~	~~104~~	8	125	131	~~134~~	5	231
6	Iryna Dekha (UKR)	A	98	101	103	6	117	121	123	10	226
7	Anacarmen Torres (MEX)	A	93	96	~~99~~	15	125	130	~~134~~	6	226
8	Alejandra Garza (MEX)	A	95	98	~~100~~	14	124	~~127~~	127	7	225
9	Raushan Meshitkhanova (KAZ)	B	100	105	108	2nd place, silver medalist(s)	~~115~~	115	~~120~~	16	223
10	Mun Min-hee (KOR)	A	100	~~105~~	~~109~~	9	115	116	123	9	223
11	Siriyakorn Khaipandung (THA)	A	97	101	~~103~~	7	117	120	~~123~~	13	221
12	Anna Van Bellinghen (BEL)	B	~~98~~	98	~~102~~	11	117	120	122	11	220
13	Aýsoltan Toýçyýewa (TKM)	B	91	95	98	13	118	~~121~~	121	12	219
14	Tursunoy Jabborova (UZB)	A	93	96	99	10	115	119	~~122~~	15	218
15	Elena Cîlcic (MDA)	B	90	95	98	12	114	119	~~122~~	14	217
16	Dilara Narin (TUR)	B	90	93	~~96~~	16	115	123	~~128~~	8	216
17	Ecaterina Tretiacova (MDA)	B	87	91	93	17	107	111	114	17	207
18	Dilara Uçan (TUR)	B	80	~~83~~	84	18	100	103	106	18	190
19	Erdenebatyn Bilegsaikhan (MGL)	B	83	~~86~~	~~86~~	19	99	103	105	19	188
20	Michaela Skleničková (CZE)	B	77	80	83	21	98	102	~~105~~	20	185
21	Rayen Cupid (VIN)	B	83	~~86~~	~~86~~	20	~~101~~	~~101~~	101	21	184
—	Tatev Hakobyan (ARM)	A	~~104~~	~~104~~	~~104~~	—	—	—	—	—	—
