= Weightlifting at the 2016 Summer Olympics – Women's 75 kg =

Women's 75 kg at the Games of the XXXI Olympiad
- Venue: Riocentro
- Date: 12 August 2016
- Competitors: 15 from 15 nations
- Winning total: 274 kg

Medalists
1st place, gold medalist(s)		Rim Jong-sim	North Korea
2nd place, silver medalist(s)		Darya Naumava	Belarus
3rd place, bronze medalist(s)		Lydia Valentín	Spain

The Women's 75 kg weightlifting competitions at the 2016 Summer Olympics in Rio de Janeiro took place from 12 August at the Pavilion 2 of Riocentro.

== Schedule ==
All times are Time in Brazil (UTC-03:00)

Date	Time	Event
12 August 2016	12:30	Group B
12 August 2016	15:30	Group A

== Records ==
Prior to this competition, the existing world and Olympic records were as follows.

World record	Snatch	Natalia Zabolotnaya (RUS)	135 kg	Belgorod, Russia	17 December 2011
World record	Clean & Jerk	Kim Un-ju (PRK)	164 kg	Incheon, South Korea	25 September 2014
World record	Total	Natalia Zabolotnaya (RUS)	296 kg	Belgorod, Russia	17 December 2011
Olympic record	Snatch	Natalia Zabolotnaya (RUS)	131 kg	London, United Kingdom	3 August 2012
Olympic record	Clean & Jerk	Svetlana Podobedova (KAZ)	161 kg	London, United Kingdom	3 August 2012
Olympic record	Total	Natalia Zabolotnaya (RUS)	291 kg	London, United Kingdom	3 August 2012

== Results ==
Rank	Athlete	Nation	Group	Body weight	Snatch (kg)				Clean & Jerk (kg)				Total
Rank	Athlete	Nation	Group	Body weight	1	2	3	Result	1	2	3	Result	Total
1st place, gold medalist(s)	Rim Jong-sim	North Korea	A	74.47	117	~~121~~	121	121	145	153	~~162~~	153	274
2nd place, silver medalist(s)	Darya Naumava	Belarus	A	74.63	107	112	116	116	136	139	142	142	258
3rd place, bronze medalist(s)	Lydia Valentín	Spain	A	74.00	112	~~116~~	116	116	135	138	141	141	257
4	Ubaldina Valoyes	Colombia	A	74.28	106	109	111	111	131	136	~~138~~	136	247
5	Iryna Dekha	Ukraine	A	74.89	111	114	~~116~~	114	133	~~138~~	~~141~~	133	247
6	Jenny Arthur	United States	A	74.65	~~103~~	103	107	107	130	135	~~141~~	135	242
7	María Fernanda Valdés	Chile	B	74.66	~~107~~	~~107~~	107	107	135	~~142~~	~~142~~	135	242
8	Gaëlle Nayo-Ketchanke	France	A	73.61	102	~~107~~	~~107~~	102	132	135	~~140~~	135	237
9	Alejandra Garza	Mexico	B	74.59	~~98~~	98	~~101~~	98	~~125~~	125	126	126	224
10	Sona Poghosyan	Armenia	B	72.52	92	97	~~100~~	97	115	122	126	126	223
11	Mary Opeloge	Samoa	B	74.56	97	100	~~102~~	100	115	117	118	118	218
12	Natalia Prișcepa	Moldova	B	73.72	93	97	~~100~~	97	110	116	~~123~~	116	213
13	Assiya İpek	Turkey	B	69.77	80	83	~~85~~	83	95	100	103	103	186
14	Samira Ouass	Morocco	B	73.68	70	75	~~80~~	75	90	~~96~~	97	97	172
–	Jaqueline Ferreira	Brazil	A	74.89	~~103~~	~~103~~	~~103~~	–	–	–	–	–	–
