= Weightlifting at the 2014 Asian Games – Women's 75 kg =

Women's 75 kg at the 2014 Asian Games
- Venue: Moonlight Festival Garden Venue
- Date: 25 September 2014
- Competitors: 9 from 7 nations

Medalists
gold medal	Kim Un-ju	North Korea
silver medal	Kang Yue	China
bronze medal	Rim Jong-sim	North Korea

The women's 75 kilograms event at the 2014 Asian Games took place on 25 September 2014 at Moonlight Festival Garden Weightlifting Venue in Incheon, South Korea.

== Schedule ==
All times are Korea Standard Time (UTC+09:00)

Date	Time	Event
Thursday, 25 September 2014	16:00	Group A

== Records ==
Prior to this competition, the existing world, Asian and Games records were as follows.

World Record	Snatch	Natalya Zabolotnaya (RUS)	135 kg	Belgorod, Russia	17 December 2011
World Record	Clean & Jerk	Nadezhda Evstyukhina (RUS)	163 kg	Paris, France	10 November 2011
World Record	Total	Natalya Zabolotnaya (RUS)	296 kg	Belgorod, Russia	17 December 2011
Asian Record	Snatch	Svetlana Podobedova (KAZ)	134 kg	Antalya, Turkey	22 September 2010
Asian Record	Clean & Jerk	Svetlana Podobedova (KAZ)	161 kg	Antalya, Turkey	22 September 2010
Asian Record	Total	Svetlana Podobedova (KAZ)	295 kg	Antalya, Turkey	22 September 2010
Games Record	Snatch	Svetlana Podobedova (KAZ)	130 kg	Guangzhou, China	18 November 2010
Games Record	Clean & Jerk	Svetlana Podobedova (KAZ)	157 kg	Guangzhou, China	18 November 2010
Games Record	Total	Svetlana Podobedova (KAZ)	287 kg	Guangzhou, China	18 November 2010

== Results ==
Rank	Athlete	Group	Body weight	Snatch (kg)				Clean & Jerk (kg)				Total
Rank	Athlete	Group	Body weight	1	2	3	Result	1	2	3	Result	Total
1st place, gold medalist(s)	Kim Un-ju (PRK)	A	74.47	120	125	128	128	156	163	164	164	292
2nd place, silver medalist(s)	Kang Yue (CHN)	A	74.54	125	~~131~~	131	131	153	160	~~164~~	160	291
3rd place, bronze medalist(s)	Rim Jong-sim (PRK)	A	72.22	118	~~122~~	~~122~~	118	146	153	~~154~~	153	271
4	Zhazira Zhapparkul (KAZ)	A	69.80	112	118	~~121~~	118	140	~~145~~	145	145	263
5	Hwang Pu-lum (KOR)	A	73.04	105	~~110~~	~~112~~	105	~~133~~	134	~~141~~	134	239
6	Yao Chi-ling (TPE)	A	74.34	97	102	~~106~~	102	125	130	~~135~~	130	232
7	Manami Fujita (JPN)	A	74.35	92	96	~~98~~	96	112	~~116~~	~~116~~	112	208
8	Ayumi Kamiya (JPN)	A	72.50	88	91	94	94	103	106	110	110	204
9	Thuraia Sobh (SYR)	A	72.46	75	80	83	83	97	104	~~109~~	104	187

== New records ==
The following records were established during the competition.

Snatch	131	Kang Yue (CHN)	GR
Clean & Jerk	160	Kang Yue (CHN)	GR
Clean & Jerk	163	Kim Un-ju (PRK)	AR
Clean & Jerk	164	Kim Un-ju (PRK)	WR
Total	291	Kang Yue (CHN)	GR
Total	292	Kim Un-ju (PRK)	GR
