= 2006 World Weightlifting Championships – Women's 75 kg =

The 2006 World Weightlifting Championships were held in Santo Domingo, Dominican Republic from 30 September to 7 October. The women's 75 kilograms division was staged on 5 October 2006.

== Schedule ==
Date	Time	Event
5 October 2006	12:00	Group B
5 October 2006	16:00	Group A

== Medalists ==
Event	Gold		Silver		Bronze	
Snatch	Nadezhda Evstyukhina (RUS)	122 kg	Cao Lei (CHN)	118 kg	Nahla Ramadan (EGY)	115 kg
Clean & Jerk	Cao Lei (CHN)	150 kg	Nadezhda Evstyukhina (RUS)	145 kg	Zarema Kasaeva (RUS)	136 kg
Total	Cao Lei (CHN)	268 kg	Nadezhda Evstyukhina (RUS)	267 kg	Zarema Kasaeva (RUS)	246 kg

== Records ==
Prior to this competition, the existing world records were as follows.

World Record	Snatch	Natalya Zabolotnaya (RUS)	130 kg	Doha, Qatar	13 November 2005
World Record	Clean & Jerk	Liu Chunhong (CHN)	159 kg	Doha, Qatar	13 November 2005
World Record	Total	Svetlana Podobedova (RUS)	286 kg	Hangzhou, China	2 June 2006

== Results ==
Rank	Athlete	Group	Body weight	Snatch (kg)				Clean & Jerk (kg)				Total
Rank	Athlete	Group	Body weight	1	2	3	Rank	1	2	3	Rank	Total
1st place, gold medalist(s)	Cao Lei (CHN)	A	71.49	115	118	~~122~~	2nd place, silver medalist(s)	145	~~150~~	150	1st place, gold medalist(s)	268
2nd place, silver medalist(s)	Nadezhda Evstyukhina (RUS)	A	73.65	115	118	122	1st place, gold medalist(s)	~~145~~	145	~~150~~	2nd place, silver medalist(s)	267
3rd place, bronze medalist(s)	Zarema Kasaeva (RUS)	A	70.48	105	110	~~115~~	4	130	~~136~~	136	3rd place, bronze medalist(s)	246
4	Kim Soon-hee (KOR)	A	74.54	105	~~110~~	110	6	133	~~141~~	~~141~~	5	243
5	Ubaldina Valoyes (COL)	A	70.70	~~100~~	100	105	7	127	132	135	4	240
6	Sinta Darmariani (INA)	A	73.92	99	~~103~~	~~103~~	16	~~130~~	~~130~~	132	6	231
7	Irina Vlassova (KAZ)	A	74.35	95	100	~~105~~	11	125	130	~~132~~	7	230
8	Nadiya Myronyuk (UKR)	A	74.61	97	100	103	8	118	123	125	11	228
9	Damaris Aguirre (MEX)	B	74.56	98	102	~~106~~	9	120	125	~~127~~	10	227
10	Yvonne Kranz (GER)	B	74.58	93	96	98	17	122	~~126~~	126	9	224
11	Claret Bellorín (VEN)	B	74.40	95	100	~~102~~	12	116	120	123	12	223
12	Natallia Ivanenka (BLR)	B	74.83	90	95	100	14	115	~~120~~	120	14	220
13	Yesenia Gauna (VEN)	B	74.97	98	102	~~104~~	10	110	116	117	15	219
14	Natividad Domínguez (DOM)	B	74.97	95	~~99~~	~~99~~	19	117	122	~~127~~	13	217
15	Doreen Fullhart (USA)	B	74.95	100	~~103~~	~~103~~	15	110	114	~~119~~	17	214
16	Iryna Kulesha (BLR)	B	74.88	90	94	97	18	105	110	115	16	212
17	Nguyễn Thị Phương Loan (VIE)	B	73.16	~~93~~	93	—	20	102	~~105~~	105	19	198
18	Eleni Kourtelidou (GRE)	B	74.41	81	85	~~88~~	21	~~105~~	105	106	18	191
19	Martina Szepesi (HUN)	B	69.45	~~75~~	75	78	22	93	98	~~101~~	20	176
—	Nahla Ramadan (EGY)	A	74.58	111	115	~~119~~	3rd place, bronze medalist(s)	~~140~~	~~140~~	~~140~~	—	—
—	Yang Houqin (MAC)	A	74.35	110	~~112~~	~~112~~	5	~~140~~	~~140~~	~~140~~	—	—
—	Lydia Valentín (ESP)	A	74.65	~~100~~	~~100~~	100	13	~~120~~	~~120~~	~~120~~	—	—
—	Kazue Imahoko (JPN)	A	73.87	~~100~~	~~100~~	~~100~~	—	118	123	126	8	—
