= Rim Jong-sim =

North Korean weightlifter (born 1993)

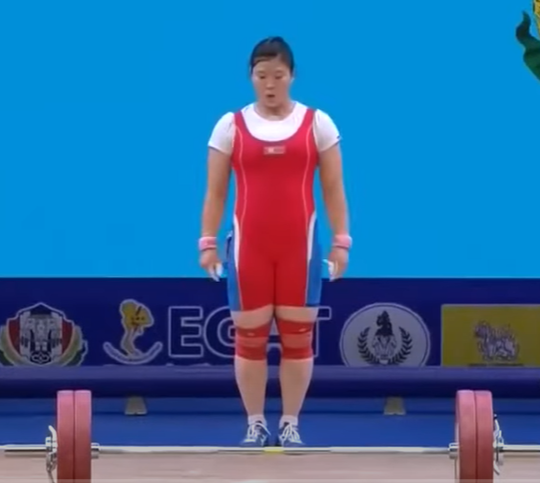
- Rim in 2019

Personal information
- Born: 5 February 1993 (age 33) Pyongyang, North Korea
- Height: 1.60 m (5 ft 3 in)
- Weight: 75.90 kg (167 lb)

Sport
- Country: North Korea
- Sport: Weightlifting
- Event: –76 kg
- Club: Kigwancha Sports Club
Medal record
Women's weightlifting
Representing North Korea
Olympic Games
Gold medal – first place	2012 London	–69 kg
Gold medal – first place	2016 Rio de Janeiro	–75 kg
World Championships
Gold medal – first place	2019 Pattaya	–76 kg
Silver medal – second place	2015 Houston	–75 kg
Silver medal – second place	2018 Ashgabat	–76 kg
Bronze medal – third place	2014 Almaty	–75 kg
Asian Games
Gold medal – first place	2018 Jakarta-Palembang	–75 kg
Bronze medal – third place	2014 Incheon	–75 kg
Asian Championships
Gold medal – first place	2019 Ningbo	–76 kg
Silver medal – second place	2013 Astana	–69 kg

- Rim Jong-sim
- Hangul: 림정심
- RR: Rim Jeongsim
- MR: Rim Chŏngsim

Rim Jong-sim (Korean: 림정심; Korean pronunciation: [ɾim.dzʌŋ.ɕim] or [ɾim] [tsʌŋ.ɕim]; born 5 February 1993) is a North Korean retired weightlifter, two-time Olympic Champion, World Champion, Asian Games gold and bronze medalist, and Asian Champion competing in the 69 kg and 75 kg category until 2018, and 76 kg starting in 2018, after the International Weightlifting Federation reorganized the categories.

== Career ==
Rim won the gold medal at the 2012 Summer Olympics at the women's 69 kg event. Four years later, she won the gold medal at the women's 75 kg event at the 2016 Summer Olympics.

== Personal life ==
Rim has a younger sister Rim Un-sim who is an Olympic weightlifter in 64 kg division.

She is a mother.

== Major results ==
Year	Venue	Weight	Snatch (kg)				Clean & jerk (kg)				Total	Rank
Year	Venue	Weight	1	2	3	Rank	1	2	3	Rank	Total	Rank
Olympic Games
2012	(United Kingdom) London, Great Britain	69 kg	111	115	~~117~~	1	142	~~146~~	146	1	261	1st place, gold medalist(s)
2016	Rio de Janeiro, Brazil	75 kg	117	~~121~~	121	1	145	153	~~162~~	1	274	1st place, gold medalist(s)
World Championships
2010	Antalya, Turkey	63 kg	100	104	~~107~~	5	127	~~130~~	~~130~~	7	231	6
2014	Almaty, Kazakhstan	75 kg	115	120	123	4	147	153	~~156~~	1st place, gold medalist(s)	276	3rd place, bronze medalist(s)
2015	Houston, United States	75 kg	120	125	~~128~~	2nd place, silver medalist(s)	150	155	~~157~~	1st place, gold medalist(s)	280	2nd place, silver medalist(s)
2018	Ashgabat, Turkmenistan	76 kg	115	119	~~121~~	1st place, gold medalist(s)	145	150	~~153~~	2nd place, silver medalist(s)	269	2nd place, silver medalist(s)
2019	Pattaya, Thailand	76 kg	120	124 WR	~~126~~	1st place, gold medalist(s)	148	152	~~155~~	2nd place, silver medalist(s)	276	1st place, gold medalist(s)
Asian Games
2010	Guangzhou, China	69 kg	100	~~103~~	103	3	126	~~129~~	129	4	232	4
2014	Incheon, South Korea	75 kg	118	~~122~~	~~122~~	4	146	153	~~154~~	3	271	3rd place, bronze medalist(s)
2018	Jakarta, Indonesia	75 kg	110	113	116	1	137	142	147	1	263	1st place, gold medalist(s)
Asian Championships
2019	Ningbo, China	76 kg	115	119	123 WR	1st place, gold medalist(s)	148	152	155	1st place, gold medalist(s)	278 WR	1st place, gold medalist(s)
