= Mun Min-hee =

South Korean weightlifter (born 1995)

Personal information
- Born: 7 July 1995 (age 30)

Sport
- Country: South Korea
- Sport: Weightlifting
Medal record
Women's weightlifting
Representing South Korea
Asian Games
Bronze medal – third place	2018 Jakarta–Palembang	75 kg
Asian Championships
Bronze medal – third place	2024 Tashkent	71 kg
Bronze medal – third place	2025 Jiangshan	64 kg

Mun Min-hee (born 7 July 1995) is a South Korean weightlifter. She won the bronze medal in the women's 75 kg event at the 2018 Asian Games held in Jakarta, Indonesia.

In 2018, she competed in the women's 81 kg event at the World Weightlifting Championships held in Ashgabat, Turkmenistan. She finished in 10th place.
