= Ayumi Kamiya =

Japanese weightlifter

Personal information
- Nationality: Japan
- Born: 28 March 1992 (age 33)
- Education: Kanazawa Gakuin University
- Weight: 75.60 kg (166.7 lb)

Sport
- Country: Japan
- Sport: Weightlifting
- Weight class: 76 kg
- Club: Kanazawa Gakuin University
- Coached by: Yoshiyuki Miyake

Ayumi Kamiya (born 28 March 1992) is a Japanese female weightlifter, most recently competing in the 76 kg division at the 2018 World Weightlifting Championships.

== Major results ==
| Year | Venue | Weight | Snatch (kg) | | | | Clean & Jerk (kg) | | | | Total | Rank |
| Year | Venue | Weight | 1 | 2 | 3 | Rank | 1 | 2 | 3 | Rank | Total | Rank |
Representing Japan
World Championships
| 2017 | Anaheim, United States | 75 kg | ~~98~~ | 98 | ~~103~~ | 11 | 117 | 121 | ~~124~~ | 11 | 219 | 11 |
| 2018 | Ashgabat, Turkmenistan | 76 kg | 100 | 102 | 104 | 7 | 118 | ~~121~~ | 121 | 9 | 225 | 7 |
Asian Games
| 2014 | Incheon, South Korea | 75 kg | 88 | 91 | 94 | 8 | 103 | 106 | 110 | 8 | 204 | 8 |
| 2018 | Jakarta, Indonesia | 75 kg | 100 | ~~103~~ | ~~103~~ | 4 | 118 | 122 | ~~127~~ | 5 | 222 | 5 |
