= Rabia Kaya =

Turkish weightlifter (born 1994)

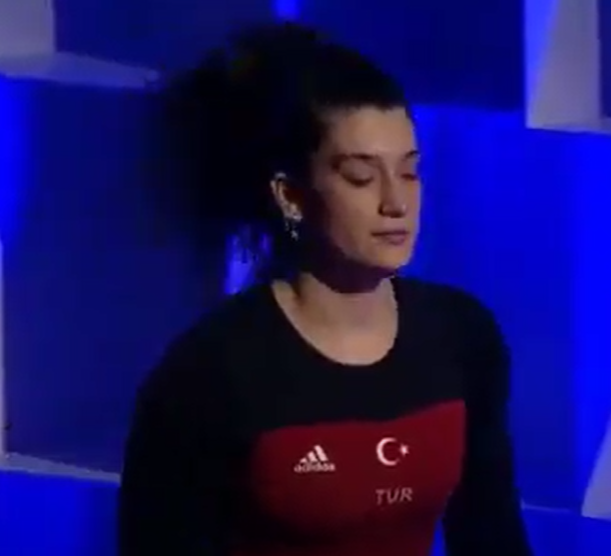

Personal information
- Born: 5 December 1994 (age 31)

Sport
- Country: Turkey
- Sport: Weightlifting
- Weight class: 75 kg
Medal record
Women's weightlifting
Representing Turkey
Islamic Solidarity Games
Silver medal – second place	2017 Baku	75 kg
Mediterranean Games
Bronze medal – third place	2018 Tarragona	75 kg Snatch

Rabia Kaya (born 5 December 1994) is a Turkish weightlifter. She won the silver medal in the women's 75 kg event at the 2017 Islamic Solidarity Games held in Baku, Azerbaijan.

In 2017, she competed in the women's 75 kg event at the European Weightlifting Championships held in Split, Croatia without winning a medal. In the same year, she also represented Turkey at the 2017 Summer Universiade held in Taipei, Taiwan in the women's 75 kg event. In this event she finished in 6th place.

At the 2018 Mediterranean Games in Tarragona, Spain, she won the bronze medal in the 75 kg Snatch event.
