= Mel Daluzyan =

Armenian weightlifter (born 1988)

Personal information
- Born: 20 April 1988 (age 38)
- Height: 1.6 m (5 ft 3 in)
- Weight: 69 kg (152 lb)

Sport
- Country: Armenia
- Sport: Weightlifting
- Event: 69 kg
Medal record
Women's Weightlifting
Representing Armenia
World Championships
Bronze medal – third place	2006 Santo Domingo	63 kg
Bronze medal – third place	2010 Antalya	69 kg
European Championships
Gold medal – first place	2007 Strasbourg	63 kg
Gold medal – first place	2008 Lignano Sabbiadoro	63 kg
Silver medal – second place	2010 Minsk	69 kg

Mel Daluzyan (Armenian: Մելինե Դալուզյան, born 20 April 1988 in Leninakan, Armenian SSR) is an Armenian weightlifter. He received the Honoured Master of Sports of Armenia title in 2006 and was twice European Women's Weightlifting Champion in the 63kg class, in 2007 and 2008.

== Biography ==
He was born as Meline Daluzyan and states that already as a young child he never felt as a girl. He started weight training in 2002 under the leadership of Artashes Nersisyan. His parents opposed his passion at first but later became proud of his achievements. He is a seven-time Armenian Champion and won the Junior European Championship in both 2005 and 2006.

Daluzyan won a bronze medal at the 2006 World Weightlifting Championships. Daluzyan was the first weightlifter from Armenia to win a World medal in the female category. The next year, Daluzyan won a gold medal at the 2007 European Weightlifting Championships and was the first Armenian to become a European Champion in weightlifting. Daluzyan repeated this success at the 2008 European Weightlifting Championships. Daluzyan was set to compete at the 2008 Summer Olympics in Beijing, but suffered an acute attack of pancreatitis two weeks before the Olympics and was forced to withdraw from the competition. Hripsime Khurshudyan competed as substitute.

In 2010, Daluzyan won a silver medal at the 2010 European Weightlifting Championships and a bronze medal at the 2010 World Weightlifting Championships. At his Olympic debut in the 2012 Summer Olympics he was unable to set a total.

Daluzyan's samples from the 2012 Olympics were re-analyzed in May 2019 and found to be positive for dehydrochlormethyltestosterone metabolites and stanozolol metabolites. Consequently, Daluzyan was disqualified from the Olympic Games.

In 2015, Daluzyan participated in an LGBT event in Armenia and subsequently faced discrimination. In 2016 he moved to the Netherlands where he received asylum and has been working as a trainer.

In 2019, Daluzyan was commended by the Amsterdam mayor for having stopped a robbery in an Amsterdam supermarket. He sustained stabbing wounds during the incident.

== Film ==
The 2022 documentary film Mel by Paul Cohen and Inna Sahakyan describes Daluzyan's journey from championship to exile. When the partial financing of the film by the Armenian government caused some controversy in the country, both Prime Minister Nikol Pashinyan and former Prime Minister Armen Darbinyan voiced their support for the film and for Daluzyan.
