= Gaëlle Nayo-Ketchanke =

French weightlifter (born 1988)

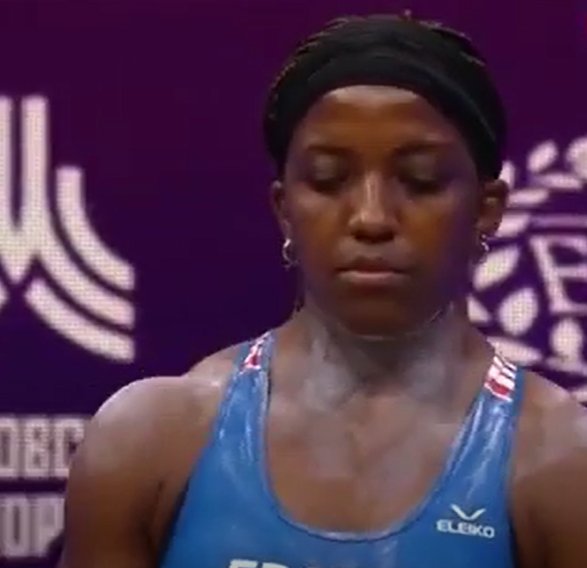
- Gaelle in 2021

Personal information
- Nationality: French, Cameroonian
- Born: Gaëlle Verlaine Nayo-Ketchanke; 20 April 1988 (age 38) Douala, Cameroon
- Home town: Clermont-l'Hérault, France
- Height: 1.74 m (5 ft 9 in)
- Weight: 75 kg (165 lb)

Sport
- Country: France
- Sport: Weightlifting
- Event: –75kg
- Club: Clermont Sports Halterophile
Medal record
Women's weightlifting
Representing Cameroon
African Championships
Bronze medal – third place	Strand 2008	–69 kg
Representing France
World Championships
Bronze medal – third place	Anaheim 2017	–75 kg
European Championships
Silver medal – second place	2015 Tbilisi	–75 kg
Silver medal – second place	2016 Førde	–75 kg
Silver medal – second place	2018 Bucharest	–75 kg
Silver medal – second place	2021 Moscow	–81 kg
Mediterranean Games
Silver medal – second place	2018 Tarragona	–75 kg (snatch)
Silver medal – second place	2018 Tarragona	–75 kg (c&j)

Gaëlle Nayo-Ketchanke (born 20 April 1988) is a French weightlifter. She holds six French records. She is a 4 time silver medalist at the European Championships (2015, 2016, 2018 and 2021) at the women's 75 kg and 81 kg events. In April 2019 she suffered a serious injury at the European Championships, breaking her arm in two places while attempting to snatch 107 kg. After just 5 months, she returned to competition at the World Championships in Pattaya.

In 2021, she competed in the women's 87 kg event at the 2020 Summer Olympics in Tokyo, Japan.

== Major results ==
Year	Venue	Weight	Snatch (kg)				Clean & Jerk (kg)				Total	Rank
Year	Venue	Weight	1	2	3	Rank	1	2	3	Rank	Total	Rank
Representing France
Olympic Games
2021	Tokyo, Japan	87 kg	103	106	108	7	135	139	~~145~~	5	247	5
2016	Rio de Janeiro, Brazil	75 kg	102	~~107~~	~~107~~	8	132	135	~~140~~	5	237	8
World Championships
2019	Pattaya, Thailand	81 kg	85	90	95	14	120	125	130	8	225	11
2018	Ashgabat, Turkmenistan	76 kg	101	105	107	6	130	136	~~138~~	6	243	6
2017	Anaheim, United States	75 kg	100	103	~~105~~	6	131	134	~~138~~	2nd place, silver medalist(s)	237	3rd place, bronze medalist(s)
2015	Houston, United States	75 kg	105	~~108~~	109	6	~~135~~	135	~~138~~	8	244	8
2014	Almaty, Kazakhstan	75 kg	100	104	107	8	125	~~131~~	131	8	238	7
European Championships
2021	Moscow, Russia	81 kg	96	~~100~~	100	4	126	~~131~~	131	1st place, gold medalist(s)	231	2nd place, silver medalist(s)
2019	(Georgia (country)) Batumi, Georgia	76 kg	103	~~106~~	~~107~~	3rd place, bronze medalist(s)	—	—	—	—	—	—
2018	Bucharest, Romania	75 kg	98	101	103	2nd place, silver medalist(s)	126	131	~~136~~	2nd place, silver medalist(s)	234	2nd place, silver medalist(s)
2016	Førde, Norway	75 kg	102	107	110	2nd place, silver medalist(s)	132	~~140~~	~~140~~	2nd place, silver medalist(s)	242	2nd place, silver medalist(s)
2015	(Georgia (country)) Tbilisi, Georgia	75 kg	105	108	111	3rd place, bronze medalist(s)	132	137	~~142~~	2nd place, silver medalist(s)	248	2nd place, silver medalist(s)
Representing Cameroon
World Championships
2011	Paris, France	69 kg	100	~~103~~	~~103~~	14	—	—	—	—	—	—
African Championships
2008	Strand, South Africa	69 kg	80	~~85~~	85	5	110	112	115	2	200	3rd place, bronze medalist(s)
African Games
2007	Algiers, Algeria	69 kg	80	83	~~87~~	4	100	105	~~110~~	4	188	4
Commonwealth Games
2006	Melbourne, Australia	63 kg	72	75	~~78~~	5	~~95~~	~~95~~	95	4	170	5
