= Weightlifting at the 2007 All-Africa Games – Women's 69 kg =

Weightlifting – Women's 69 kg at the 2007 All-Africa Games
- Dates: 17 July 2007
- Competitors: 7 from 7 nations
- Winning total weight: 212

Medalists
| gold medal | Leila Lassouani | Algeria |
| silver medal | Hebat Ahmed | Egypt |
| bronze medal | Janet Thelermont | Seychelles |

The Women's 69 kg weightlifting event at the 2007 All-Africa Games were held in Algiers, Algeria on 17 July 2007.

== Records ==
Prior to this competition, the existing world, Commonwealth and Games records were as follows:

| World record | Snatch | Oxana Slivenko (RUS) | 123 kg | Santo Domingo, Dominican Republic | 4 October 2006 |
| World record | Clean & Jerk | Zarema Kasaeva (RUS) | 157 kg | Doha, Qatar | 13 November 2005 |
| World record | Total | Liu Chunhong (CHN) | 275 kg | Athens, Greece | 19 August 2004 |
| African record | Snatch | Nahla Ramadan (EGY) | 110 kg | Warsaw, Poland | 22 November 2002 |
| African record | Clean & Jerk | Nahla Ramadan (EGY) | 135 kg | Warsaw, Poland | 22 November 2002 |
| African record | Total | Nahla Ramadan (EGY) | 245 kg | Warsaw, Poland | 22 November 2002 |
| Games record | Snatch | | | | |
| Games record | Clean & Jerk | | | | |
| Games record | Total | | | | |

== Schedule ==
All times are West Africa Time (UTC+1)

| Date | Time | Round |
|---|---|---|
| Tuesday 17 July 2007 | 13:00 | Group A |

== Results ==
| Rank | Athlete | Body weight (kg) | Snatch (kg) | | | | | Clean & Jerk (kg) | | | | | Total |
| Rank | Athlete | Body weight (kg) | 1 | 2 | 3 | Result | Rank | 1 | 2 | 3 | Result | Rank | Total |
|---|---|---|---|---|---|---|---|---|---|---|---|---|---|
| 1st place, gold medalist(s) | Leila Lassouani (ALG) | 64.00 | 90 | 93 | 95 | 95 | 1st place, gold medalist(s) | 114 | 117 | ~~120~~ | 117 | 2nd place, silver medalist(s) | 212 |
| 2nd place, silver medalist(s) | Hebat Ahmed (EGY) | 67.00 | 91 | 94 | ~~96~~ | 94 | 3rd place, bronze medalist(s) | 113 | ~~117~~ | 118 | 118 | 1st place, gold medalist(s) | 212 |
| 3rd place, bronze medalist(s) | Janet Thelermont (SEY) | 67.80 | ~~90~~ | 92 | 95 | 95 | 2nd place, silver medalist(s) | 105 | ~~111~~ | ~~111~~ | 105 | 5 | 200 |
| 4 | Gaëlle Nayo-Ketchanke (CMR) | 66.13 | 80 | 83 | ~~87~~ | 83 | 4 | 100 | 105 | ~~110~~ | 105 | 4 | 188 |
| 5 | Mercy Obiero (KEN) | 66.29 | 70 | 75 | ~~80~~ | 75 | 5 | 90 | 95 | 100 | 100 | 6 | 175 |
| – | Joubaba Ben Chobba (TUN) | 67.12 | ~~87~~ | ~~87~~ | ~~90~~ | – | – | 113 | 117 | ~~120~~ | 117 | 3rd place, bronze medalist(s) | – |
| – | Helen Ali (GHA) | 68.10 | ~~75~~ | 75 | ~~77~~ | 75 | 6 | ~~100~~ | ~~100~~ | ~~120~~ | – | – | – |
