= Darya Naumava =

Belarusian weightlifter (born 1995)

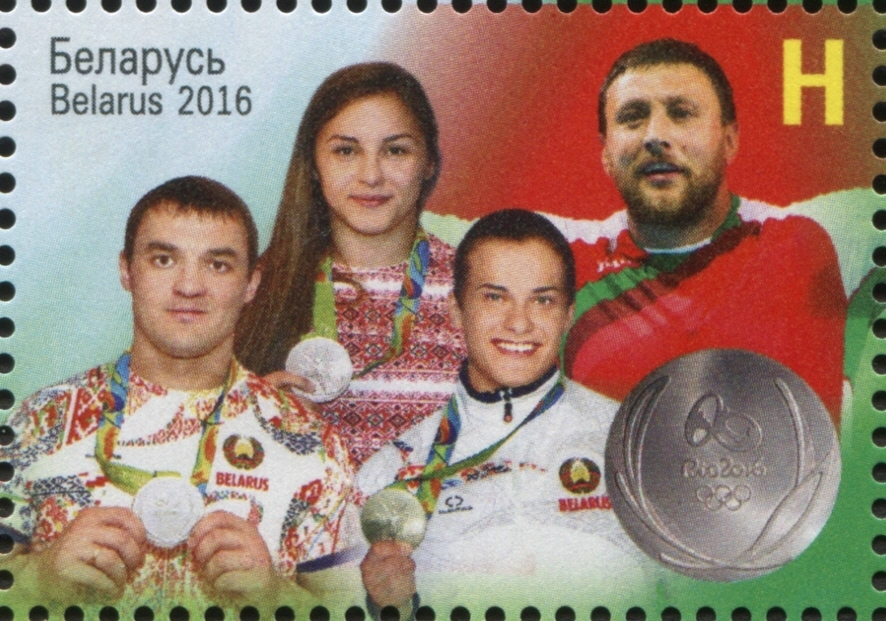
- Naumava (bottom right) on a 2016 stamp of Belarus

Personal information
- Nationality: Belarusian
- Born: 26 August 1995 (age 30) Potoka, Klichaw Raion, Belarus
- Education: Mogilev State A. Kuleshov University
- Height: 1.65 m (5 ft 5 in)
- Weight: 77.89 kg (172 lb)

Sport
- Country: Belarus
- Sport: Weightlifting
- Event: –81 kg
Medal record
Representing Belarus
Olympic Games
Silver medal – second place	2016 Rio de Janeiro	–75 kg
World Championships
Silver medal – second place	2018 Ashgabat	–81 kg
European Championships
Gold medal – first place	2019 Batumi	–76 kg

Darya Siarheyeuna Naumava (Belarusian: Дар’я Сяргееўна Навумава; born 26 August 1995) is a Belarusian weightlifter and European Champion. She won silver medals at the 2014 Junior World Championships and 2016 Summer Olympics.

She represented Belarus at the 2020 Summer Olympics in Tokyo, Japan. She competed in the women's 76 kg event.

Naumava has two sisters. All sisters are teachers by profession. They grew up in a peasant family, and the eldest, Polina, trained in kettlebell lifting. Darya first took up shot put and discus throw, but around the age of 16 changed to weightlifting, which fitted better to her relatively short stature (1.65 m).

== Major results ==
Year	Venue	Weight	Snatch (kg)				Clean & Jerk (kg)				Total	Rank
Year	Venue	Weight	1	2	3	Rank	1	2	3	Rank	Total	Rank
Olympic Games
2016	Rio de Janeiro, Brazil	75 kg	107	112	116	3	136	139	142	2	258	2nd place, silver medalist(s)
World Championships
2015	Houston, United States	75 kg	105	110	115	5	135	140	142	5	257	5
2018	Ashgabat, Turkmenistan	81 kg	100	15	108	3rd place, bronze medalist(s)	130	135	137	1st place, gold medalist(s)	245	2nd place, silver medalist(s)
European Championships
2015	(Georgia (country)) Tbilisi, Georgia	75 kg	100	105	108	4	133	~~140~~	~~140~~	4	241	4
2019	(Georgia (country)) Batumi, Georgia	76 kg	100	104	106	2nd place, silver medalist(s)	126	133	136	1st place, gold medalist(s)	242	1st place, gold medalist(s)
