= Hadiza Zakari =

Nigerian-Iranian fashion model

Personal information
- Born: 26 September 1989 (age 36)
Medal record
Commonwealth Games
Gold medal – first place	2010 Delhi	75 kg
World Championships

Hadiza Zakari (born 26 September 1989) is a Nigerian former weightlifter who competed in the women's 75 kg category. She represented Nigeria in multiple international competitions and is a Commonwealth Games gold medalist.

== Career ==
Zakari began her weightlifting career as a serving member of the Nigerian Security and Civil Defence Corps (NSCDC). She established herself on the continental stage by winning a gold medal at the 2008 African Weightlifting Championships in the 75 kg class.

She made her international debut at the 2009 World Weightlifting Championships, where she placed 13th overall with a total lift of 228 kg (103 kg in the snatch and 125 kg in the clean and jerk).

Her most notable achievement came at the 2010 Commonwealth Games in Delhi, India. Competing in the 75 kg event, Zakari won the gold medal in a dramatic final. She lifted 110 kg in the snatch and 129 kg in the clean and jerk for a combined total of 239 kg. This performance set a new Commonwealth Games record and placed her 14 kilograms ahead of the silver medalist, Canada's Marie-Eve Beauchemin-Nadeau. This victory also marked Nigeria's third weightlifting gold medal at those Games.

She later competed at the 2011 World Weightlifting Championships, but her career was derailed shortly thereafter by anti-doping violations.

== Doping Suspension ==
Following the 2011 World Championships, Zakari tested positive for stanozolol, a prohibited anabolic steroid. Consequently, the International Weightlifting Federation (IWF) handed her a two-year suspension from competitive sports, spanning from May 2012 to May 2014.
