= Svetlana Shimkova =

Russian weightlifter (born 1983)

Personal information
- Born: 18 September 1983 (age 42)
Medal record
Women's Weightlifting
Representing Russia
World Championships
Gold medal – first place	2010 Antalya	– 69 kg
Silver medal – second place	2005 Doha	– 63 kg
Silver medal – second place	2006 Santo Domingo	– 63 kg
European Championships
Gold medal – first place	2005 Sofia	– 63 kg
Gold medal – first place	2006 Władysławowo	– 63 kg

Svetlana Shimkova (born 18 September 1983) is a Russian weightlifter.

At the 2005 World Weightlifting Championships she won the silver medal in the 63 kg category, with a world record clean and jerk of 139 kg, which was surpassed in the same contest by Pawina Thongsuk with 140 kg.

She won gold in the 63 kg category at the 2005, and again at the 2006 European Weightlifting Championships, in 2006 with another world record clean and jerk of 141 kg.

Shimkova participated in the women's -63 kg class at the 2006 World Weightlifting Championships and won the silver medal, finishing behind Quyang Xiaofang. She snatched 108 kg and clean and jerked an additional 133 kg for a total of 241 kg, 5 kg behind winner Quyang.

At the 2007 World Weightlifting Championships she participated in the 69 kg category, with 112 kg ranked 4th in the snatch, but failed to lift in the clean and jerk.
