= Carlotta Brunelli =

Italian weightlifter

Personal information
- Full name: Carlotta Brunelli
- Born: 11 April 1993 (age 33)
- Weight: 74.63 kg (164.5 lb)

Sport
- Country: Italy
- Sport: Weightlifting
- Team: National team
- Updated on 4 September 2016

Carlotta Brunelli (born 11 April 1993) is an Italian weightlifter, competing in the 75 kg category and representing Italy at international competitions.

She competed at world championships, most recently at the 2014 World Weightlifting Championships.

She competed in the women's 71 kg event at the 2022 Mediterranean Games held in Oran, Algeria.

== Major results ==
Year	Venue	Weight	Snatch (kg)				Clean & Jerk (kg)				Total	Rank
Year	Venue	Weight	1	2	3	Rank	1	2	3	Rank	Total	Rank
World Championships
2014	Almaty, Kazakhstan	75 kg	90	93	~~95~~	19	~~103~~	103	~~110~~	24	196	24
