= Sólveig Sigurðardóttir =

Icelandic CrossFit athlete

Personal information
- Nationality: Icelandic
- Born: 1995 (age 29–30)
- Occupation: CrossFit athlete
- Years active: 2013–2024
- Height: 167 cm (5 ft 5 1/2 in)
- Weight: 67 kg (148 lb)

Sport
- Sport: CrossFit, Olympic weightlifting

Sólveig Sigurðardóttir (born 1995), also known as Sóla, is an Icelandic former crossfit athlete.

== Crossfit ==
Sólveig started crossfit training in 2012. In October 2021, she won the Madrid CrossFit Championship and in 2022, she competed at the 2022 CrossFit Games where she finished 34th. In the first week of March 2024, she competed in the SandClash tournament in Saudi Arabia where she finished third. A few days later, she announced her retirement from the sport.

== Olympic Weightlifting ==
Sólveig competed in Olympic Weightlifting during the years 2013-2017 competing at the International Weightlifting Federation 2017 World Weightlifting Championships in Anaheim, California. She ended in 13th place with a 190 kg total, 82 kg Snatch and a 108 kg Clean and jerk her best competition lifts.

Year	Venue	Weight	Snatch (kg)				Clean & Jerk (kg)				Total	Rank
Year	Venue	Weight	1	2	3	Rank	1	2	3	Rank	Total	Rank
World Championships
2017	Anaheim, United States	69 kg	82	86	86	14	103	104	108	14	190	13
