= Sara Sigmundsdóttir =

Icelandic weightlifter and CrossFit athlete

Personal information
- Full name: Ragnheiður Sara Sigmundsdóttir
- Born: 12 September 1992 (age 34) Reykjanesbær, Iceland
- Years active: 2013–present
- Height: 173 cm (5 ft 8 in)
- Weight: 69 kg (152 lb)

Sport
- Country: Iceland
- Sport: CrossFit and Weightlifting

Achievements and titles
- World finals: 2016 Dubai Fitness Championship - 1st 2016 CrossFit Games - 3rd 2015 CrossFit Games - 3rd
- Regional finals: 2017 Central Regional champion Twice Meridian Regional champion (2015, 2016)
- Personal bests: Clean and Jerk: 112 kg (247 lb); Snatch: 95 kg (209 lb); Deadlift: 155 kg (342 lb); Backsquat:135 kg (298 lb)

Ragnheiður Sara Sigmundsdóttir (born 12 September 1992) is an Icelandic weightlifter and CrossFit athlete known for her third-place finishes at the 2015 and 2016 CrossFit Games and her first-place finishes at the 2015 and 2016 Meridian Regionals and the 2017 Central Regionals. She was featured in 2017 documentary 'Fittest on Earth: A Decade of Fitness'. She competed at the 2015 World Weightlifting Championships in the 75 kg category.

Sigmundsdóttir missed the 2021 CrossFit Games after injuring her knee in training. Though she has not been back to the Games since her injury, she came back strong in 2022, with a 6th place finish in the CrossFit Lowlands Throwdown SemiFinal.

== CrossFit Games results ==
Year	Games	Regionals	Open (worldwide)
2013	—	39th (Europe)	169th (world)
2014	—	12th (Europe)	82nd
2015	3rd	1st (Meridian)	17th
2016	3rd	1st (Meridian)	20th
2017	4th	1st (Central)	1st
2018	37th* (Note: —Withdrew due to injury)	3rd (Europe)	20th
Year	Games	Qualifier	Open
2019	19th	1st (SiD)	1st (world); 1st (Iceland)
2020	21st	1st (Filthy 150); 1st (Dubai); 2nd (WZA)	1st (world); 1st (Iceland)
2021	—	—	—
2022	—	6th (Lowlands Throwdown) 12th (Last-Chance Qualifier)	48th (world) 21st (Europe) 3rd (Iceland)
2023	—	18th (Europe Semifinal)	184th (world) 58th (Europe) 4th (Iceland)
2024	—	CrossFit Individual Quarterfinals: 41st (world) 27th (Europe)	30th (world) 10th (Europe) 1st (Iceland)

== Weightlifting Major results ==
Year	Venue	Weight	Snatch (kg)				Clean & Jerk (kg)				Total	Rank
Year	Venue	Weight	1	2	3	Rank	1	2	3	Rank	Total	Rank
World Championships
2015	Houston, United States	75 kg	80	~~85~~	~~85~~	31	100	105	~~110~~	28	185	29
