= Kang Yue =

Chinese weightlifter (born 1991)

Personal information
- Nationality: China
- Born: 8 October 1991 (age 34) Qingdao, China
- Weight: 85.55 kg (189 lb)

Sport
- Country: China
- Sport: Weightlifting
- Event: -87 kg
Medal record
Women's weightlifting
Representing China
World Championships
Gold medal – first place	2015 Houston	–75 kg
Silver medal – second place	2014 Almaty	–75 kg
Silver medal – second place	2013 Wrocław	–75 kg
Silver medal – second place	2010 Antalya	–69 kg
Asian Championships
Silver medal – second place	2021 Tashkent	–87 kg
Asian Games
Silver medal – second place	2014 Incheon	–75 kg
Junior World Championships
Gold medal – first place	2011 Penang	–69 kg
Universiade
Silver medal – second place	2011 Shenzhen	–75 kg

Kang Yue (Chinese: 康月; pinyin: Kāng yuè; born 8 October 1991) is a Chinese weightlifter and World Champion competing in the 75 kg division until 2018, and 87 kg starting in 2018, after the International Weightlifting Federation reorganized the categories.

== Career ==
Kang's first appearance was at the 2009 National Games of China, where she placed third in the women's 69 kg class.

=== World Championships ===
In 2010, Kang made her first international appearance in the women's 69 kg class at the 2010 World Weightlifting Championships in Antalya. She finished second in both the snatch and clean & jerk, earning a silver medal.

At the 2013 World Weightlifting Championships in Wrocław, Kang moved up to the 75 kg class, where she finished first in the snatch, and second in the clean and jerk. This culminated in an overall silver medal finish.

In the following year at the 2014 World Weightlifting Championships in Almaty, Kang went on to win silver in the snatch, and bronze in the clean & jerk. This resulted in another silver medal.

At the 2015 World Weightlifting Championships in the United States, Kang went on to finish first in the snatch and third place in the clean and jerk, which resulted with an overall gold medal finish.

=== Asian Games ===
In 2014, Kang competed at the 2014 Asian Games in Incheon, where she finished first in the snatch, and second in the clean and jerk. This resulted in a silver medal finish.

=== Asian Championships ===
Kang went on to compete in the women's 87 kg category at the 2021 Asian Weightlifting Championships, following the International Weightlifting Federation's decision to update their weight classes in 2018. She went on to earn silver medals in the snatch and clean and jerk, resulting in another silver medal finish.

== Major results ==
Year	Venue	Weight	Snatch (kg)				Clean & jerk (kg)				Total	Rank	Ref
Year	Venue	Weight	1	2	3	Rank	1	2	3	Rank	Total	Rank	Ref
Representing China
World Championships
2010	Antalya, Turkey	69 kg	105	~~113~~	113	2nd place, silver medalist(s)	~~130~~	130	140	2nd place, silver medalist(s)	253	2nd place, silver medalist(s)	
2013	Wrocław, Poland	75 kg	122	126	~~131~~	1st place, gold medalist(s)	~~150~~	~~150~~	150	2nd place, silver medalist(s)	276	2nd place, silver medalist(s)	
2014	Almaty, Kazakhstan	75 kg	~~126~~	~~126~~	126	2nd place, silver medalist(s)	151	~~155~~	~~155~~	3rd place, bronze medalist(s)	277	2nd place, silver medalist(s)	
2015	Houston, United States	75 kg	127	~~130~~	~~130~~	1st place, gold medalist(s)	155	~~158~~	~~158~~	3rd place, bronze medalist(s)	282	1st place, gold medalist(s)	
Asian Games
2014	Incheon, South Korea	75 kg	125	~~131~~	131	1	153	160	~~164~~	2	291	2nd place, silver medalist(s)	
Asian Championships
2021	Tashkent, Uzbekistan	87 kg	~~118~~	118	~~125~~	2nd place, silver medalist(s)	149	~~155~~	155	2nd place, silver medalist(s)	273	2nd place, silver medalist(s)	
