= Omadoy Otakuziyeva =

Uzbekistani weightlifter (born 1996)

Personal information
- Born: 4 April 1996 (age 30)

Sport
- Country: Uzbekistan
- Sport: Weightlifting
- Weight class: 75 kg
Medal record
Women's weightlifting
Representing Uzbekistan
Asian Games
Silver medal – second place	2018 Jakarta–Palembang	75 kg
Islamic Solidarity Games
Bronze medal – third place	2017 Baku	75 kg
Asian Indoor and Martial Arts Games
Silver medal – second place	2017 Ashgabat	75 kg

Omadoy Otakuziyeva (born 4 April 1996) is an Uzbekistani weightlifter. She won the silver medal in the women's 75 kg event at the 2018 Asian Games held in Jakarta, Indonesia.

In 2017, Otakuziyeva won the bronze medal in the women's 75 kg event at the Islamic Solidarity Games held in Baku, Azerbaijan. In that same year, she also won the silver medal in the women's 75 kg event at the 2017 Asian Indoor and Martial Arts Games held in Ashgabat, Turkmenistan.
