= 2010 World Weightlifting Championships =

International weightlifting competition

2010 World Championships
- Host city: Antalya, Turkey
- Dates: 17–26 September
- Main venue: Antalya Expo Center

The 2010 World Weightlifting Championships were held at Antalya Expo Center in Antalya, Turkey. The event took place from September 17 to September 26, 2010.

== Medal summary ==
=== Men ===
Event	Gold		Silver		Bronze	
56 kg
Snatch	Wu Jingbiao; China	132 kg	Cha Kum-chol; North Korea	130 kg	Long Qingquan; China	127 kg
Clean & Jerk	Long Qingquan; China	161 kg	Wu Jingbiao; China	160 kg	Carlos Berna; Colombia	152 kg
Total	Wu Jingbiao; China	292 kg	Long Qingquan; China	288 kg	Cha Kum-chol; North Korea	280 kg
62 kg
Snatch	Kim Un-guk; North Korea	147 kg	Erol Bilgin; Turkey	143 kg	Ding Jianjun; China	142 kg
Clean & Jerk	Zhang Jie; China	174 kg	Kim Un-guk; North Korea	173 kg	Eko Yuli Irawan; Indonesia	172 kg
Total	Kim Un-guk; North Korea	320 kg	Zhang Jie; China	315 kg	Erol Bilgin; Turkey	314 kg
69 kg
Snatch	Mete Binay; Turkey	160 kg	Armen Ghazaryan; Russia	148 kg	Triyatno; Indonesia	146 kg
Clean & Jerk	Kim Kum-sok; North Korea	181 kg	Armen Ghazaryan; Russia	181 kg	Bredni Roque; Cuba	180 kg
Total	Mete Binay; Turkey	335 kg	Armen Ghazaryan; Russia	329 kg	Triyatno; Indonesia	324 kg
77 kg
Snatch	Tigran Martirosyan; Armenia	173 kg	Lü Xiaojun; China	170 kg	Kianoush Rostami; Iran	161 kg
Clean & Jerk	Lü Xiaojun; China	200 kg	Tigran Martirosyan; Armenia	200 kg	Tarek Yehia; Egypt	199 kg
Total	Tigran Martirosyan; Armenia	373 kg	Lü Xiaojun; China	370 kg	Tarek Yehia; Egypt	356 kg
85 kg
Snatch	Ara Khachatryan; Armenia	175 kg	Adrian Zieliński; Poland	173 kg	Aleksey Yufkin; Russia	172 kg
Clean & Jerk	Siarhei Lahun; Belarus	211 kg	Yoelmis Hernández; Cuba	210 kg	Adrian Zieliński; Poland	210 kg
Total	Adrian Zieliński; Poland	383 kg	Aleksey Yufkin; Russia	380 kg	Siarhei Lahun; Belarus	377 kg
94 kg
Snatch	Aleksandr Ivanov; Russia	185 kg	Artem Ivanov; Ukraine	185 kg	Aurimas Didžbalis; Lithuania	178 kg
Clean & Jerk	Valeriu Calancea; Romania	220 kg	Aleksandr Ivanov; Russia	218 kg	Andrey Demanov; Russia	218 kg
Total	Aleksandr Ivanov; Russia	403 kg	Artem Ivanov; Ukraine	402 kg	Valeriu Calancea; Romania	397 kg
105 kg
Snatch	Dmitry Klokov; Russia	192 kg	Vladimir Smorchkov; Russia	190 kg	Marcin Dołęga; Poland	188 kg
Clean & Jerk	Marcin Dołęga; Poland	227 kg	Dmitry Klokov; Russia	223 kg	Bartłomiej Bonk; Poland	222 kg
Total	Marcin Dołęga; Poland	415 kg	Dmitry Klokov; Russia	415 kg	Vladimir Smorchkov; Russia	410 kg
+105 kg
Snatch	Evgeny Chigishev; Russia	210 kg	Behdad Salimi; Iran	208 kg	Artem Udachyn; Ukraine	205 kg
Clean & Jerk	Matthias Steiner; Germany	246 kg	Behdad Salimi; Iran	245 kg	Jeon Sang-guen; South Korea	242 kg
Total	Behdad Salimi; Iran	453 kg	Matthias Steiner; Germany	440 kg	Artem Udachyn; Ukraine	440 kg

=== Women ===
Event	Gold		Silver		Bronze	
48 kg
Snatch	Sibel Özkan; Turkey	90 kg	Tian Yuan; China	88 kg	Pramsiri Bunphithak; Thailand	83 kg
Clean & Jerk	Tian Yuan; China	116 kg	Sibel Özkan; Turkey	115 kg	Chen Wei-ling; Chinese Taipei	105 kg
Total	Sibel Özkan; Turkey	205 kg	Tian Yuan; China	204 kg	Pramsiri Bunphithak; Thailand	186 kg
53 kg
Snatch	Chen Xiaoting; China	100 kg	Yuderqui Contreras; Dominican Republic	93 kg	Aylin Daşdelen; Turkey	90 kg
Clean & Jerk	Chen Xiaoting; China	122 kg	Aylin Daşdelen; Turkey	121 kg	Hiromi Miyake; Japan	113 kg
Total	Chen Xiaoting; China	222 kg	Aylin Daşdelen; Turkey	211 kg	Yuderqui Contreras; Dominican Republic	206 kg
58 kg
Snatch	Pak Hyon-suk; North Korea	103 kg	Nastassia Novikava; Belarus	103 kg	Deng Wei; China	102 kg
Clean & Jerk	Deng Wei; China	135 kg	Jong Chun-mi; North Korea	130 kg	Nastassia Novikava; Belarus	130 kg
Total	Deng Wei; China	237 kg	Nastassia Novikava; Belarus	233 kg	Jong Chun-mi; North Korea	230 kg
63 kg
Snatch	Ouyang Xiaofang; China	112 kg	Sibel Şimşek; Turkey	111 kg	Kim Soo-kyung; South Korea	107 kg
Clean & Jerk	Maiya Maneza; Kazakhstan	143 kg WR	Nísida Palomeque; Colombia	134 kg	O Jong-ae; North Korea	130 kg
Total	Maiya Maneza; Kazakhstan	246 kg	Sibel Şimşek; Turkey	241 kg	Ouyang Xiaofang; China	241 kg
69 kg
Snatch	Svetlana Shimkova; Russia	116 kg	Kang Yue; China	113 kg	Meline Daluzyan; Armenia	112 kg
Clean & Jerk	Svetlana Shimkova; Russia	140 kg	Kang Yue; China	140 kg	Meline Daluzyan; Armenia	139 kg
Total	Svetlana Shimkova; Russia	256 kg	Kang Yue; China	253 kg	Meline Daluzyan; Armenia	251 kg
75 kg
Snatch	Svetlana Podobedova; Kazakhstan	134 kg WR	Natalya Zabolotnaya; Russia	133 kg	Nadezhda Evstyukhina; Russia	123 kg
Clean & Jerk	Svetlana Podobedova; Kazakhstan	161 kg WR	Nadezhda Evstyukhina; Russia	160 kg	Natalya Zabolotnaya; Russia	160 kg
Total	Svetlana Podobedova; Kazakhstan	295 kg WR	Natalya Zabolotnaya; Russia	293 kg	Nadezhda Evstyukhina; Russia	283 kg
+75 kg
Snatch	Tatiana Kashirina; Russia	145 kg WR	Meng Suping; China	131 kg	Jang Mi-ran; South Korea	130 kg
Clean & Jerk	Meng Suping; China	179 kg	Jang Mi-ran; South Korea	179 kg	Tatiana Kashirina; Russia	170 kg
Total	Tatiana Kashirina; Russia	315 kg	Meng Suping; China	310 kg	Jang Mi-ran; South Korea	309 kg

== Medal table ==
Ranking by Big (Total result) medals

Rank	Nation	Gold	Silver	Bronze	Total
1	China	3	6	1	10
2	Russia	3	4	2	9
3	Turkey	2	2	1	5
4	Kazakhstan	2	0	0	2
4	Poland	2	0	0	2
6	North Korea	1	0	2	3
7	Armenia	1	0	1	2
8	Iran	1	0	0	1
9	Belarus	0	1	1	2
9	Ukraine	0	1	1	2
11	Germany	0	1	0	1
12	Dominican Republic	0	0	1	1
12	Egypt	0	0	1	1
12	Indonesia	0	0	1	1
12	Romania	0	0	1	1
12	South Korea	0	0	1	1
12	Thailand	0	0	1	1
Totals (17 entries)		15	15	15	45

Ranking by all medals: Big (Total result) and Small (Snatch and Clean & Jerk)

Rank	Nation	Gold	Silver	Bronze	Total
1	China	13	12	4	29
2	Russia	9	11	7	27
3	Kazakhstan	5	0	0	5
4	Turkey	4	6	2	12
5	North Korea	4	3	3	10
6	Armenia	3	1	3	7
6	Poland	3	1	3	7
8	Belarus	1	2	2	5
9	Iran	1	2	1	4
10	Germany	1	1	0	2
11	Romania	1	0	1	2
12	Ukraine	0	2	2	4
13	South Korea	0	1	4	5
14	Colombia	0	1	1	2
14	Cuba	0	1	1	2
14	Dominican Republic	0	1	1	2
17	Indonesia	0	0	3	3
18	Egypt	0	0	2	2
18	Thailand	0	0	2	2
20	Chinese Taipei	0	0	1	1
20	Japan	0	0	1	1
20	Lithuania	0	0	1	1
Totals (22 entries)		45	45	45	135

== Team ranking ==
=== Men ===
Rank	Team	Points
1	Russia	521
2	China	453
3	Poland	433
4	Uzbekistan	391
5	Iran	338
6	South Korea	310

=== Women ===
Rank	Team	Points
1	China	522
2	Kazakhstan	419
3	Russia	384
4	Colombia	363
5	Turkey	330
6	Thailand	321

== Participating nations ==
515 competitors from 74 nations competed.

- Albania (10)
- Armenia (10)
- Azerbaijan (9)
- Belarus (10)
- Belgium (1)
- Bosnia and Herzegovina (1)
- Brazil (4)
- Cameroon (4)
- Canada (13)
- China (15)
- Chinese Taipei (13)
- Colombia (14)
- Croatia (1)
- Cuba (6)
- Czech Republic (8)
- Denmark (1)
- Dominican Republic (5)
- Ecuador (9)
- Egypt (10)
- El Salvador (2)
- Fiji (1)
- Finland (3)
- France (8)
- Georgia (7)
- Germany (11)
- Great Britain (1)
- Greece (9)
- Guatemala (1)
- Hong Kong (1)
- Hungary (11)
- India (9)
- Indonesia (12)
- Iran (7)
- Iraq (8)
- Ireland (2)
- Italy (9)
- Japan (15)
- Kazakhstan (15)
- Kosovo (1)
- Kyrgyzstan (4)
- Latvia (3)
- Lithuania (5)
- Macau (2)
- Mauritius (1)
- Mexico (4)
- Moldova (7)
- Mongolia (7)
- North Korea (9)
- Norway (1)
- Poland (15)
- Puerto Rico (5)
- Qatar (2)
- Romania (11)
- Russia (14)
- Saudi Arabia (8)
- Serbia (1)
- Slovakia (7)
- South Africa (6)
- South Korea (12)
- Spain (10)
- Sweden (3)
- Switzerland (1)
- Tajikistan (1)
- Thailand (13)
- Tunisia (5)
- Turkey (15)
- Turkmenistan (8)
- Ukraine (14)
- United Arab Emirates (3)
- United States (15)
- Uruguay (1)
- Uzbekistan (13)
- Venezuela (10)
- Vietnam (2)
