= Rosa Tenorio =

Ecuadorian weightlifter

Personal information
- Born: 2 October 1984 (age 41) Guayaquil, Ecuador
- Height: 1.63 m (5 ft 4 in)
- Weight: 69 kg (152 lb)

Sport
- Sport: Weightlifting

Rosa Ángela Tenorio Silva (born 2 October 1984) is an Ecuadorian weightlifter. She competed at the 2012 Summer Olympics in the -69 kg event and finished 11th.
