= Jenny Arthur =

American weightlifter (born 1993)

Personal information
- Full name: Jenny Lyvette Arthur
- Born: December 11, 1993 (age 32) Gainesville, Georgia, United States
- Height: 1.66 m (5 ft 5 in)
- Weight: 80.95 kg (178 lb)

Sport
- Country: United States
- Sport: Weightlifting
- Event: –81 kg
Medal record
World Championships
Bronze medal – third place	2019 Pattaya	–81 kg

Jenny Lyvette Arthur (born December 11, 1993) is an American weightlifter that qualified for the 2016 Summer Olympics.

== Early life ==
Arthur attended Chestatee High School.

== Youth career ==
In 2010, she won the youth national weightlifting championship.

== Senior career ==
Arthur qualified for the 2016 Olympics by virtue of her placement at the last two World Weightlifting Championships.
