= Marie-Ève Beauchemin-Nadeau =

Canadian weightlifter (born 1988)

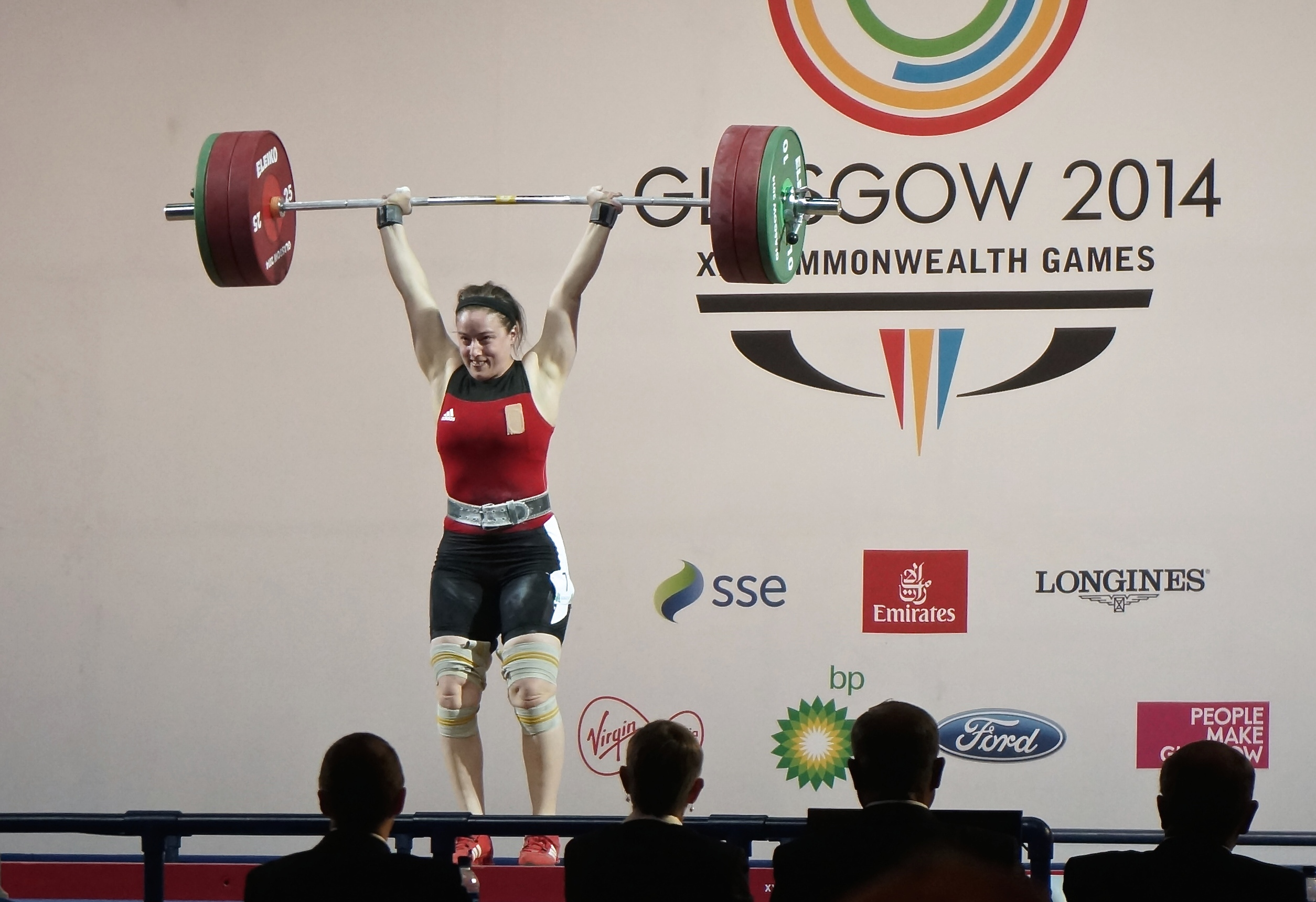
- Pictured competing in 2014

Personal information
- Born: October 13, 1988 (age 38) Montreal, Quebec
- Height: 1.66 m (5 ft 5 1/2 in)
- Weight: 69 kg (152 lb)

Sport
- Country: Canada
- Sport: Weightlifting
- Event: Women's 69 kg
Medal record
Commonwealth Games
Gold medal – first place	2014 Glasgow	75 kg
Silver medal – second place	2010 Delhi	75 kg
Silver medal – second place	2018 Gold Coast	75 kg
Summer Universiade
Bronze medal – third place	2011 Shenzhen	69 kg
Bronze medal – third place	2013 Kazan	75 kg

Marie-Ève Beauchemin-Nadeau (born October 13, 1988) is a Canadian Olympian weightlifter. She competed at the 2012 Summer Olympics in the -69 kg event and finished eighth. At the 2014 Commonwealth Games she won a gold medal in the 75 kg event with a 110 kg snatch and a 140 clean and jerk for a combined total of 250 kg, a Commonwealth Games record. She competed at the 2016 Summer Olympics in the same category, again finishing eighth, with a total of 228 kg.
