= Yao Chi-ling =

Taiwanese weightlifter

Yao Chi-Ling
Personal information
- Born: 31 March 1993 (age 32)
- Weight: 75.00 kg (165.35 lb)

Sport
- Country: Chinese Taipei
- Sport: Weightlifting
- Team: National team
- Updated on 31 August 2016

Yao Chi-Ling (born 31 March 1993) is a Taiwanese weightlifter, competing in the 75 kg category and representing Chinese Taipei at international competitions.

She competed at world championships, including at the 2015 World Weightlifting Championships.

== Major results ==
Year	Venue	Weight	Snatch (kg)				Clean & Jerk (kg)				Total	Rank
Year	Venue	Weight	1	2	3	Rank	1	2	3	Rank	Total	Rank
World Championships
2015	Houston, United States	75 kg	96	100	103	15	~~123~~	123	~~130~~	16	226	15
2014	Almaty, Kazakhstan	75 kg	97	~~101~~	101	11	125	~~130~~	~~130~~	12	226	11
