= Olga Zubova =

Russian weightlifter (born 1993)

Medal record

Representing Russia

Women's Weightlifting

World Championships
Disqualified	2015 Houston	−75 kg
Disqualified	2013 Wrocław	−75 kg

European Championships
Disqualified	2012 Antalya	−75 kg

Summer Universiade
Disqualified	2013 Kazan	−75 kg

Olga Zubova (born 9 December 1993) is a Russian weightlifter.

== Career ==
After coming back from a 2-year suspension and not having been defeated for gold in any competition until the World Weightlifting Championships in Houston, USA 2015, she was the prime candidate to lead the Russian women's 75 kg class for gold in the 2016 Olympics until she was suspended for drug violations once again.

She competed in the 2013 World Weightlifting Championships – Women's 75 kg convincingly winning the gold medal but then got disqualified for using a banned substance, Clomiphene, in competition that resulted in her 1st suspension

She returned to competition at the 2015 World Weightlifting Championships in Houston, Texas and took bronze in women's 75 kg, where she failed a doping control again.

In May 2016, Olga Zubova was banned for eight years for doping.

Since being banned she has participated in the relative new sport CrossFit that stresses a combination of various athletic movements requiring great muscle endurance. She purportedly had in training (while suspended) exceeded all world records in 75 kg class with a snatch over 135 kg & clean & jerk 175 kg.

In 2023 the International Weightlifting Federation annulled all her results between 11 February 2012 and 7 February 2022.
