= Nadezhda Evstyukhina =

Russian weightlifter (born 1988)

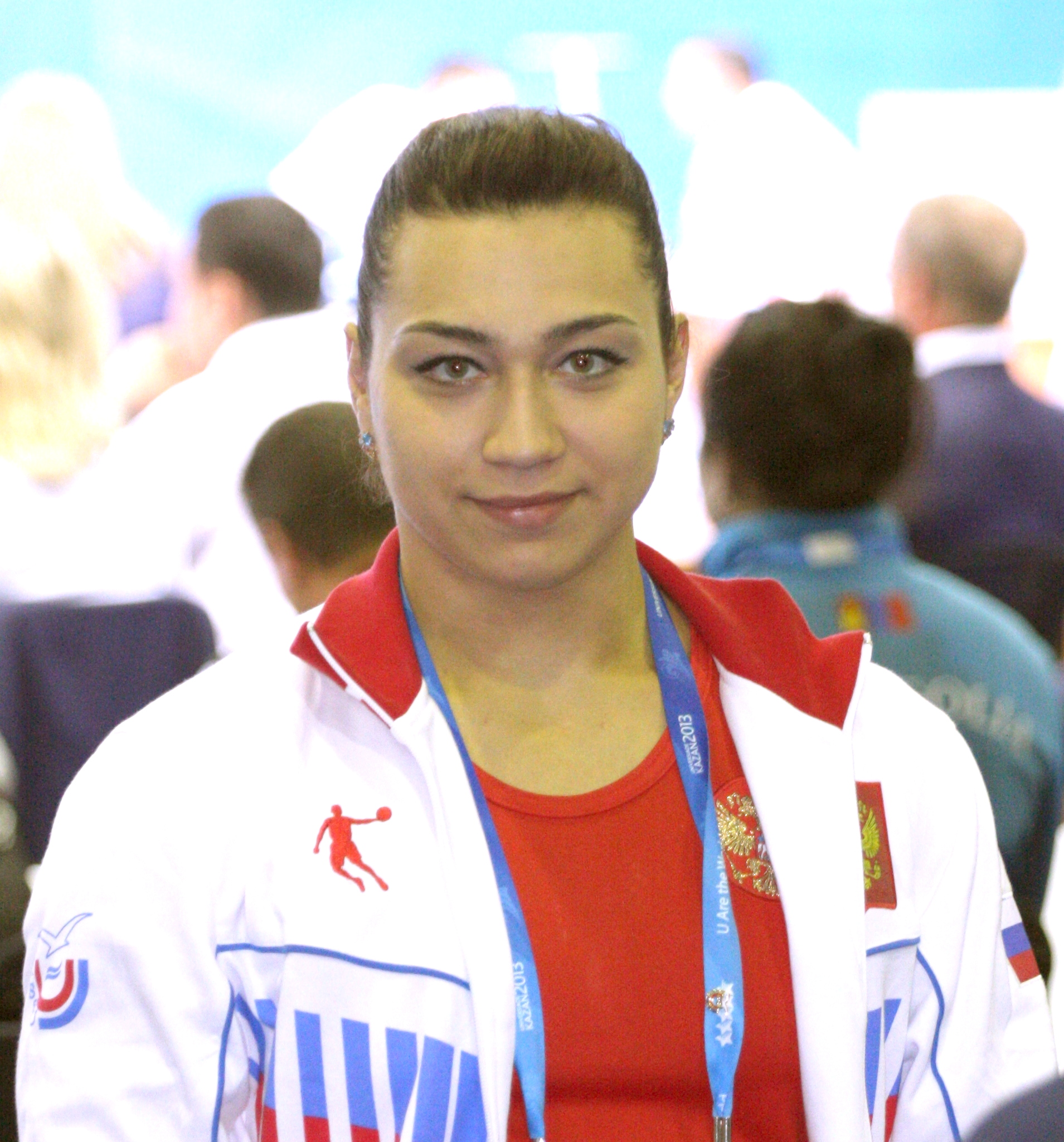
- Nadezhda Evstyukhina in 2013

Personal information
- Full name: Nadezhda Alexandrovna Evstyukhina
- Nationality: Russian
- Born: 27 May 1988 (age 38) Balashikha, Moscow Oblast, Soviet Union
- Height: 1.64 m (5 ft 5 in)
- Weight: 75 kg (165 lb)

Sport
- Country: Russia
- Sport: Weightlifting
- Event: 75 kg
- Coached by: Natalia Shiryaeva
Medal record
Olympic Games
Disqualified	2008 Beijing	75 kg
World Championships
Gold medal – first place	2011 Paris	75 kg
Gold medal – first place	2013 Wrocław	75 kg
Gold medal – first place	2014 Almaty	75 kg
Silver medal – second place	2006 Santo Domingo	75 kg
Bronze medal – third place	2007 Chiang Mai	75 kg
Bronze medal – third place	2010 Antalya	75 kg
European Championships
Gold medal – first place	2011 Kazan	75 kg
Gold medal – first place	2013 Tirana	75 kg
Silver medal – second place	2010 Minsk	75 kg

Nadezhda Alexandrovna Evstyukhina (Russian: Надежда Александровна Евстюхина; born 27 May 1988) is a Russian weightlifter.

== Career ==
In the 69 kg category, Evstyukhina won the silver medal at the 2005 Junior World Championships, and the gold medal at the 2006 Junior World Championships.

In the women's -75 kg class at the 2006 World Weightlifting Championships, Evstyukhina won the silver medal, finishing behind Cao Lei. She snatched 122 kg and clean and jerked an additional 145 kg for a total of 267 kg, 1 kg behind the winner Cao.

At the 2007 World Weightlifting Championships she won the bronze medal in the 75 kg category, with a total of 278 kg.

She also initially was awarded the bronze medal in the 75 kg category at the 2008 Summer Olympics, with a total of 264 kg. She competed at the 2012 Summer Olympics, but failed to snatch the initial weight.

On 31 August 2016, the International Olympic Committee confirmed that Evstyukhina had been disqualified from the 2008 Beijing Olympic Games. Reanalysis of Evstyukhina's samples from Beijing 2008 resulted in a positive test for the prohibited substances dehydrochlormethyltestosterone (turinabol) and EPO. As a result, her results were expunged, the athlete was disqualified and her bronze medal was removed. Retested samples from the original gold medalist Cao Lei in the same event at the 2008 Olympics also returned positive, and her medal was also withdrawn. The fate of Evstyukhina's other medals following the 2008 positive sample is to be decided by the IWF.
