= Alejandra Garza =

Mexican weightlifter (born 1991)

Personal information
- Born: 1 August 1991 (age 34)
- Height: 1.65 m (5 ft 5 in)
- Weight: 75 kg (165 lb)

Sport
- Country: Mexico
- Sport: Weightlifting
- Event: Women's 75 kg

Alejandra Garza (born 1 August 1991) is a Mexican weightlifter. She competed in the women's 75 kg event at the 2016 Summer Olympics.
