= Kim Un-ju =

North Korean weightlifter (born 1989)

Personal information
- Nationality: North Korean
- Born: 11 November 1989 (age 36)
- Weight: 86.60 kg (191 lb)

Korean name
- Hangul: 김은주
- RR: Gim Eunju
- MR: Kim Ŭnju

Sport
- Country: North Korea
- Sport: Weightlifting
- Event: –87 kg
- Club: Kigwancha Sports Club

Achievements and titles
- Personal bests: Snatch: 128 kg (2014); Clean and jerk: 164 kg (2014, AGR, WR); Total: 292 kg (2014, AGR)
Medal record
Women's weightlifting
Representing North Korea
World Weightlifting Championships
Silver medal – second place	2018 Ashgabat	–87 kg
Silver medal – second place	2019 Pattaya	–87 kg
Bronze medal – third place	2011 Paris	–75 kg
Disqualified	2014 Almaty	–75 kg
Asian Games
Gold medal – first place	2014 Incheon	–75 kg

Kim Un-ju (Korean: 김은주; born 11 November 1989) is a North Korean weightlifter, and former world record holder competing in the 75 kg category until 2018 and 87 kg starting in 2018 after the International Weightlifting Federation reorganized the categories.

== Career ==
In 2014 she was sanctioned for the use of Methyltestosterone and was banned from competition until 2016, thus disqualifying her results from the 2014 World Weightlifting Championships.

Kim competed at the 2018 World Weightlifting Championships winning a silver medal in the total.

== Major results ==
Year	Venue	Weight	Snatch (kg)				Cleans & Jerk (kg)				Total	Rank
Year	Venue	Weight	1	2	3	Rank	1	2	3	Rank	Total	Rank
World Championships
2011	Paris, France	75 kg	105	111	114	6	146	151	~~156~~	3rd place, bronze medalist(s)	265	3rd place, bronze medalist(s)
2014	Almaty, Kazakhstan	75 kg	120	126	~~127~~	--	154	~~157~~	157	--	--	DSQ
2018	Ashgabat, Turkmenistan	87 kg	108	111	~~115~~	3rd place, bronze medalist(s)	145	150	152	1st place, gold medalist(s)	263	2nd place, silver medalist(s)
2019	Pattaya, Thailand	87 kg	110	115	~~117~~	2nd place, silver medalist(s)	148	154	~~159~~	2nd place, silver medalist(s)	269	2nd place, silver medalist(s)
Asian Games
2010	Guangzhou, China	75 kg	~~103~~	103	107	4	~~138~~	138	~~144~~	3	245	4
2014	Incheon, South Korea	75 kg	120	125	128	2	156	163	164 WR	1	292	1st place, gold medalist(s)
Asian Championships
2011	Tongling, China	75 kg	~~105~~	~~105~~	~~105~~	–	132	140	146	2nd place, silver medalist(s)	–	–
2013	Astana, Kazakhstan	75 kg	~~113~~	~~113~~	~~113~~	–	~~152~~	~~152~~	~~152~~	–	–	–
Asian Interclub Championships
2013	Pyongyang, North Korea	+75 kg	107	111	117	1st place, gold medalist(s)	~~143~~	143	152	1st place, gold medalist(s)	269	1st place, gold medalist(s)
