= List of Colombian records in Olympic weightlifting =

The following are the records of Colombia in Olympic weightlifting. Records are maintained in each weight class for the snatch lift, clean and jerk lift, and the total for both lifts by the Federacion Colombiana de Levantamiento de Pesas.

== Current records ==
=== Men ===
Event	Record	Athlete	Date	Meet	Place	Ref
60 kg
Snatch	124 kg	José González	11 March 2025	Pan American Junior Championships	Havana, Cuba	
Clean & Jerk	151 kg	Jhon Serna	26 April 2026	Pan American Championships	Panama City, Panama	
Total	269 kg	Jhon Serna	26 April 2026	Pan American Championships	Panama City, Panama	
65 kg
Snatch	139 kg	Francisco Mosquera	27 April 2026	Pan American Championships	Panama City, Panama	
Clean & Jerk	181 kg	Francisco Mosquera	27 April 2026	Pan American Championships	Panama City, Panama	
Total	320 kg	Francisco Mosquera	27 April 2026	Pan American Championships	Panama City, Panama	
70 kg
Snatch	146 kg	Luis Javier Mosquera	5 October 2026	Qualification Event for the Pan American Games	Tepic, Mexico	
Clean & Jerk	171 kg	Sebastián Olivares	15 July 2025	Pan American Championships	Cali, Colombia	
Total	317 kg	Luis Javier Mosquera	5 October 2026	Qualification Event for the Pan American Games	Tepic, Mexico	
75 kg
Snatch	158 kg	Hugo Montes	31 October 2026	World Championships	Ningbo, China	
Clean & Jerk	188 kg	Hugo Montes	31 October 2026	World Championships	Ningbo, China	
Total	346 kg	Hugo Montes	31 October 2026	World Championships	Ningbo, China	
85 kg
Snatch	178 kg	Yeison López	2 November 2026	World Championships	Ningbo, China	
Clean & Jerk	210 kg	Yeison López	6 October 2026	Qualification Event for the Pan American Games	Tepic, Mexico	
Total	387 kg	Yeison López	2 November 2026	World Championships	Ningbo, China	
94 kg
Snatch	175 kg	Jokser Albornoz	7 October 2025	World Championships	Førde, Norway	
Clean & Jerk	215 kg	Jokser Albornoz	7 October 2025	World Championships	Førde, Norway	
Total	390 kg	Jokser Albornoz	7 October 2025	World Championships	Førde, Norway	
110 kg
Snatch	171 kg	Marcos Bonilla	25 November 2025	Bolivarian Games	Lima, Peru	
Clean & Jerk	212 kg	Marcos Bonilla	25 November 2025	Bolivarian Games	Lima, Peru	
Total	383 kg	Marcos Bonilla	25 November 2025	Bolivarian Games	Lima, Peru	
+110 kg
Snatch	193 kg	Rafael Cerro	30 April 2026	Pan American Championships	Panama City, Panama	
Clean & Jerk	230 kg	Rafael Cerro	17 September 2026	South American Games	Rosario, Argentina	
Total	419 kg	Rafael Cerro	30 April 2026	Pan American Championships	Panama City, Panama	

=== Women ===
Event	Record	Athlete	Date	Meet	Place	Ref
48 kg
Snatch						
Clean & Jerk						
Total						
53 kg
Snatch						
Clean & Jerk	104 kg	Julieth Jiménez	5 August 2026	CAC Games	Santo Domingo, Dominican Republic	
Total						
58 kg
Snatch	92 kg	Gelen Torres	23 November 2025	Bolivarian Games	Lima, Peru	
Clean & Jerk						
Total						
61 kg
Snatch	111 kg	Karen Mosquera	1 November 2026	World Championships	Ningbo, China	
Clean & Jerk	125 kg	Karen Mosquera	15 September 2026	South American Games	Rosario, Argentina	
Total	236 kg	Karen Mosquera	1 November 2026	World Championships	Ningbo, China	
69 kg
Snatch						
Clean & Jerk						
Total						
77 kg
Snatch	115 kg	María Mena	11 December 2025	Central American & Caribbean Championships	Santo Domingo, Dominican Republic	
Clean & Jerk	137 kg	María Mena	11 December 2025	Central American & Caribbean Championships	Santo Domingo, Dominican Republic	
Total	252 kg	María Mena	11 December 2025	Central American & Caribbean Championships	Santo Domingo, Dominican Republic	
86 kg
Snatch						
Clean & Jerk						
Total						
+86 kg
Snatch	114 kg	Yairan Tysforod	25 November 2025	Bolivarian Games	Ayacucho, Peru	
Clean & Jerk						
Total						

== Historical records ==
=== Men (2018–2025) ===
Event	Record	Athlete	Date	Meet	Place	Ref
55 kg
Snatch	115 kg	Jairo García	26 November 2019	National Games of Colombia	Cartagena, Colombia	
Clean & Jerk	142 kg	Miguel Suárez	24 July 2022	Pan American Championships	Bogotá, Colombia	
Total	248 kg	Jairo García	26 November 2019	National Games of Colombia	Cartagena, Colombia	
61 kg
Snatch	135 kg	Francisco Mosquera	3 November 2018	World Championships	Ashgabat, Turkmenistan	
Clean & Jerk	172 kg	Francisco Mosquera	19 September 2019	World Championships	Pattaya, Thailand	
Total	304 kg	Francisco Mosquera	3 November 2018	World Championships	Ashgabat, Turkmenistan	
67 kg
Snatch	151 kg	Luis Javier Mosquera	25 July 2021	Olympic Games	Tokyo, Japan	
Clean & Jerk	183 kg	Óscar Figueroa	5 December 2018	International CSLP Cup	Guayaquil, Ecuador	
Total	331 kg	Luis Javier Mosquera	25 July 2021	Olympic Games	Tokyo, Japan	
73 kg
Snatch	155 kg	Luis Javier Mosquera	8 August 2024	Olympic Games	Paris, France	
Clean & Jerk	185 kg	Hugo Montes	22 November 2023	XXII Juegos Deportivos Nacionales	Armenia, Colombia	
Total	340 kg	Luis Javier Mosquera	8 August 2024	Olympic Games	Paris, France	
81 kg
Snatch	168 kg	Brayan Rodallegas	21 April 2021	Pan American Championships	Santo Domingo, Dominican Republic	
Clean & Jerk	202 kg	Brayan Rodallegas	25 April 2019	Pan American Championships	Guatemala City, Guatemala	
Total	363 kg	Brayan Rodallegas	25 April 2019	Pan American Championships	Guatemala City, Guatemala	
89 kg
Snatch	182 kg	Yeison López	6 April 2024	World Cup	Phuket, Thailand	
Clean & Jerk	211 kg	Brayan Rodallegas	11 December 2022	World Championships	Bogotá, Colombia	
Total	392 kg	Yeison López	6 April 2024	World Cup	Phuket, Thailand	
96 kg
Snatch	187 kg	Lesman Paredes	14 December 2021	World Championships	Tashkent, Uzbekistan	
Clean & Jerk	213 kg	Jhonatan Rivas	10 November 2019	IWF Grand Prix ODESUR CSLP	Lima, Peru	
Total	400 kg	Lesman Paredes	14 December 2021	World Championships	Tashkent, Uzbekistan	
102 kg
Snatch	181 kg	Lesman Paredes	6 November 2021	Pan American Championships	Guayaquil, Ecuador	
Clean & Jerk	212 kg	Óscar Garces	21 April 2023	Central American & Caribbean Championships	Santo Domingo, Dominican Republic	
Total	390 kg	Lesman Paredes	23 April 2021	Pan American Championships	Santo Domingo, Dominican Republic	
109 kg
Snatch	175 kg	Rafael Cerro	29 November 2019	National Games of Colombia	Cartagena, Colombia	
Clean & Jerk	213 kg	Óscar Garcés	16 September 2023	World Championships	Riyadh, Saudi Arabia	
Total	382 kg	Rafael Cerro	29 November 2019	National Games of Colombia	Cartagena, Colombia	
+109 kg
Snatch	185 kg	Rafael Cerro	24 October 2023	Pan American Games	Santiago, Chile	
Clean & Jerk	225 kg	Rafael Cerro	24 October 2023	Pan American Games	Santiago, Chile	
Total	410 kg	Rafael Cerro	24 October 2023	Pan American Games	Santiago, Chile	

=== Men (1998–2018) ===
Event	Record	Athlete	Date	Meet	Place	Ref
56 kg
Snatch						
Clean & Jerk						
Total						
62 kg
Snatch	142 kg	Óscar Figueroa	8 August 2016	Olympic Games	Rio de Janeiro, Brazil	
Clean & Jerk	177 kg	Óscar Figueroa	30 July 2012	Olympic Games	London, Great Britain	
Total	318 kg	Óscar Figueroa	8 August 2016	Olympic Games	Rio de Janeiro, Brazil	
69 kg
Snatch	155 kg	Luis Javier Mosquera	9 August 2016	Olympic Games	Rio de Janeiro, Brazil	
Clean & Jerk	187 kg	Luis Javier Mosquera	8 June 2015	Junior World Championships	Wrocław, Poland	
Total	338 kg	Luis Javier Mosquera	8 June 2015	Junior World Championships	Wrocław, Poland	
77 kg
Snatch	162 kg	Yeison López	July 2017	Pan American Championships	Miami, United States	
Clean & Jerk	192 kg	Andrés Caicedo	2 December 2017	World Championships	Anaheim, United States	
Total	352 kg	Yeison López	July 2017	Pan American Championships	Miami, United States	
85 kg
Snatch						
Clean & Jerk						
Total						
94 kg
Snatch						
Clean & Jerk						
Total						
105 kg
Snatch						
Clean & Jerk						
Total						
+105 kg
Snatch	181 kg	Freddy Andres Renteria Romero	16 November 2012	XIX Colombia National Games	Cauca, Colombia	
Clean & Jerk						
Total	396 kg	Freddy Andres Renteria Romero	16 November 2012	XIX Colombia National Games	Cauca, Colombia	

=== Women (2018–2025) ===
Event	Record	Athlete	Date	Meet	Place	Ref
45 kg
Snatch	77 kg	Manuela Berrío	5 December 2022	World Championships	Bogotá, Colombia	
Clean & Jerk	96 kg	Manuela Berrío	9 May 2019	South American, Ibero-American & Open Championships	Palmira, Colombia	
Total	172 kg	Manuela Berrío	1 July 2022	Bolivarian Games	Valledupar, Colombia	
49 kg
Snatch	83 kg	Ana Segura	3 November 2018	World Championships	Ashgabat, Turkmenistan	
Clean & Jerk	105 kg	Ana Segura	27 July 2019	Pan American Games	Lima, Peru	
Total	188 kg	Ana Segura	27 July 2019	Pan American Games	Lima, Peru	
55 kg
Snatch	94 kg	Yenny Sinisterra	28 July 2019	Pan American Games	Lima, Peru	
Clean & Jerk	116 kg	Yenny Sinisterra	20 September 2019	World Championships	Pattaya, Thailand	
Total	210 kg	Yenny Sinisterra	20 September 2019	World Championships	Pattaya, Thailand	
59 kg
Snatch	105 kg	Yenny Álvarez	8 August 2024	Olympic Games	Paris, France	
Clean & Jerk	133 kg	Yenny Álvarez	8 December 2022	World Championships	Bogotá, Colombia	
Total	234 kg	Yenny Álvarez	8 December 2022	World Championships	Bogotá, Colombia	
64 kg
Snatch	106 kg	Mercedes Pérez	22 September 2019	World Championships	Pattaya, Thailand	
Clean & Jerk	132 kg	Mercedes Pérez	22 September 2019	World Championships	Pattaya, Thailand	
Total	238 kg	Mercedes Pérez	22 September 2019	World Championships	Pattaya, Thailand	
71 kg
Snatch	112 kg	Mari Sánchez	27 July 2022	Pan American Championships	Bogotá, Colombia	
Clean & Jerk	145 kg	Mari Sánchez	9 August 2024	Olympic Games	Paris, France	
Total	257 kg	Mari Sánchez	9 August 2024	Olympic Games	Paris, France	
76 kg
Snatch	110 kg	Leydi Solís	7 November 2018	World Championships	Ashgabat, Turkmenistan	
Clean & Jerk	146 kg	Leydi Solís	7 November 2018	World Championships	Ashgabat, Turkmenistan	
Total	256 kg	Leydi Solís	7 November 2018	World Championships	Ashgabat, Turkmenistan	
81 kg
Snatch	110 kg	María Mena	20 November 2024	I Juegos Nacionales Juveniles	Armenia, Colombia	
Clean & Jerk	142 kg	Leydi Solís	25 September 2019	World Championships	Pattaya, Thailand	
Total	247 kg	Leydi Solís	23 April 2021	Pan American Championships	Santo Domingo, Dominican Republic	
87 kg
Snatch	108 kg	Valeria Rivas	23 April 2021	Pan American Championships	Santo Domingo, Dominican Republic	
Clean & Jerk	140 kg	Sirley Montaño	28 November 2024	Bolivarian Games	Ayacucho, Peru	
Total	248 kg	Sirley Montaño	28 November 2024	Bolivarian Games	Ayacucho, Peru	
+87 kg
Snatch						
Clean & Jerk						
Total						

=== Women (1998–2018) ===
Event	Record	Athlete	Date	Meet	Place	Ref
-48 kg
Snatch						
Clean & Jerk	103 kg	Ana Segura	11 July 2015	Pan American Games	Toronto, Canada	
Total						
-53 kg
Snatch						
Clean & Jerk						
Total						
-58 kg
Snatch						
Clean & Jerk	128 kg	Jackelina Heredia	13 May 2012	Pan American Championships	Antigua, Guatemala	
Total						
-63 kg
Snatch						
Clean & Jerk	135 kg	Nísida Palomeque	25 October 2011	Pan American Games	Guadalajara, Mexico	
Total						
-69 kg
Snatch	112 kg	Tulia Medina	19 November 2003	World Championships	Vancouver, Canada	
Clean & Jerk	145 kg	Leydi Solís	14 July 2015	Pan American Games	Toronto, Canada	
Total	256 kg	Leydi Solís	14 July 2015	Pan American Games	Toronto, Canada	
-75 kg
Snatch						
Clean & Jerk						
Total						
+75 kg
Snatch						
Clean & Jerk						
Total						
