= World record progression men's weightlifting =

This is the list of world records progression in men's weightlifting. Records are maintained in each weight class for the snatch lift, clean and jerk lift, and the total for both lifts.

The International Weightlifting Federation restructured its weight classes in 1993, 1998, 2018 and 2025, nullifying earlier records.

== 60 kg ==
=== Snatch ===
| Athlete | Record (kg) | Date | Meet | Place | Ref. |
|---|---|---|---|---|---|
| World Standard | 141 | 1 June 2025 | — | — | |

=== Clean & Jerk ===
| Athlete | Record (kg) | Date | Meet | Place | Ref. |
|---|---|---|---|---|---|
| World Standard | 172 | 1 June 2025 | — | — | |
| (Thailand) Theerapong Silachai | 173 | 13 December 2025 | SEA Games | Chonburi | |
| (North Korea) Pang Un-chol | 174 | 11 May 2026 | Asian Championships | Gandhinagar | |

=== Total ===
| Athlete | Record (kg) | Date | Meet | Place | Ref. |
|---|---|---|---|---|---|
| World Standard | 307 | 1 June 2025 | — | — | |

== 65 kg ==
=== Snatch ===
| Athlete | Record (kg) | Date | Meet | Place | Ref. |
|---|---|---|---|---|---|
| World Standard | 148 | 1 June 2025 | — | — | |
| (China) He Yueji | 149 | 24 September 2026 | Asian Games | Nagoya | |
| (China) He Yueji | 152 | 24 September 2026 | Asian Games | Nagoya | |

=== Clean & Jerk ===
| Athlete | Record (kg) | Date | Meet | Place | Ref. |
|---|---|---|---|---|---|
| World Standard | 180 | 1 June 2025 | — | — | |
| (United States) Hampton Morris | 181 | 14 July 2025 | Pan American Championships | Cali | |
| (China) He Yueji | 183 | 13 May 2026 | Asian Championships | Gandhinagar | |
| (United States) Hampton Morris | 185 | 28 October 2026 | World Championships | Ningbo | |
| (North Korea) Pak Myong-jin | 187 | 28 October 2026 | World Championships | Ningbo | |

=== Total ===
| Athlete | Record (kg) | Date | Meet | Place | Ref. |
|---|---|---|---|---|---|
| World Standard | 322 | 1 June 2025 | — | — | |
| (Turkey) Muhammed Furkan Özbek | 324 | 4 October 2025 | World Championships | Førde | |
| (China) He Yueji | 325 | 13 May 2026 | Asian Championships | Gandhinagar | |
| (China) He Yueji | 329 | 13 May 2026 | Asian Championships | Gandhinagar | |
| (Turkey) Muhammed Furkan Özbek | 330 | 28 October 2026 | World Championships | Ningbo | |
| (North Korea) Pak Myong-jin | 331 | 28 October 2026 | World Championships | Ningbo | |

== 70 kg ==
=== Snatch ===
| Athlete | Record (kg) | Date | Meet | Place | Ref. |
|---|---|---|---|---|---|
| World Standard | 153 | 1 August 2026 | — | — | |
| (Japan) Masanori Miyamoto | 154 | 26 September 2026 | Asian Games | Nagoya | |
| (North Korea) Pak Pyol | 155 | 30 October 2026 | World Championships | Ningbo | |
| (North Korea) Pak Pyol | 157 | 30 October 2026 | World Championships | Ningbo | |

=== Clean & Jerk ===
| Athlete | Record (kg) | Date | Meet | Place | Ref. |
|---|---|---|---|---|---|
| World Standard | 188 | 1 August 2026 | — | — | |
| (North Korea) Ri Won-ju | 192 | 26 September 2026 | Asian Games | Nagoya | |
| (North Korea) Ri Won-ju | 198 | 26 September 2026 | Asian Games | Nagoya | |

=== Total ===
| Athlete | Record (kg) | Date | Meet | Place | Ref. |
|---|---|---|---|---|---|
| World Standard | 336 | 1 August 2026 | — | — | |
| (Japan) Masanori Miyamoto | 337 | 26 September 2026 | Asian Games | Nagoya | |
| (North Korea) Ri Won-ju | 338 | 26 September 2026 | Asian Games | Nagoya | |
| (Japan) Masanori Miyamoto | 342 | 26 September 2026 | Asian Games | Nagoya | |
| (North Korea) Ri Won-ju | 343 | 26 September 2026 | Asian Games | Nagoya | |
| (North Korea) Ri Won-ju | 349 | 26 September 2026 | Asian Games | Nagoya | |
| (North Korea) Pak Pyol | 352 | 30 October 2026 | World Championships | Ningbo | |
| (North Korea) Pak Pyol | 355 | 30 October 2026 | World Championships | Ningbo | |

== 75 kg ==
=== Snatch ===
| Athlete | Record (kg) | Date | Meet | Place | Ref. |
|---|---|---|---|---|---|
| World Standard | 159 | 1 August 2026 | — | — | |
| (Thailand) Weeraphon Wichuma | 160 | 26 September 2026 | Asian Games | Nagoya | |
| (North Korea) Ri Chong-song | 162 | 26 September 2026 | Asian Games | Nagoya | |

=== Clean & Jerk ===
| Athlete | Record (kg) | Date | Meet | Place | Ref. |
|---|---|---|---|---|---|
| World Standard | 195 | 1 August 2026 | — | — | |
| (Thailand) Weeraphon Wichuma | 200 | 26 September 2026 | Asian Games | Nagoya | |
| (Indonesia) Rahmat Erwin Abdullah | 201 | 26 September 2026 | Asian Games | Nagoya | |
| (Thailand) Weeraphon Wichuma | 205 | 26 September 2026 | Asian Games | Nagoya | |
| (Indonesia) Rahmat Erwin Abdullah | 206 | 26 September 2026 | Asian Games | Nagoya | |

=== Total ===
| Athlete | Record (kg) | Date | Meet | Place | Ref. |
|---|---|---|---|---|---|
| World Standard | 349 | 1 August 2026 | — | — | |
| (North Korea) Ri Chong-song | 357 | 26 September 2026 | Asian Games | Nagoya | |
| (Thailand) Weeraphon Wichuma | 360 | 26 September 2026 | Asian Games | Nagoya | |
| (Indonesia) Rahmat Erwin Abdullah | 361 | 26 September 2026 | Asian Games | Nagoya | |
| (Thailand) Weeraphon Wichuma | 365 | 26 September 2026 | Asian Games | Nagoya | |
| (Indonesia) Rahmat Erwin Abdullah | 366 | 26 September 2026 | Asian Games | Nagoya | |

== 85 kg ==
=== Snatch ===
| Athlete | Record (kg) | Date | Meet | Place | Ref. |
|---|---|---|---|---|---|
| World Standard | 171 | 1 August 2026 | — | — | |
| (Egypt) Abdelrahman Younes | 172 | 1 September 2026 | Mediterranean Games | San Giorgio Ionico | |
| (Kazakhstan) Alexey Churkin | 173 | 28 September 2026 | Asian Games | Nagoya | |
| (Egypt) Abdelrahman Younes | 174 | 2 November 2026 | World Championships | Ningbo | |
| (Colombia) Yeison López | 175 | 2 November 2026 | World Championships | Ningbo | |
| (Moldova) Marin Robu | 176 | 2 November 2026 | World Championships | Ningbo | |
| (Egypt) Abdelrahman Younes | 177 | 2 November 2026 | World Championships | Ningbo | |
| (Colombia) Yeison López | 178 | 2 November 2026 | World Championships | Ningbo | |

=== Clean & Jerk ===
| Athlete | Record (kg) | Date | Meet | Place | Ref. |
|---|---|---|---|---|---|
| World Standard | 208 | 1 August 2026 | — | — | |
| (China) Chen Shunnan | 211 | 28 September 2026 | Asian Games | Nagoya | |
| (North Korea) Ro Kwang-ryol | 214 | 28 September 2026 | Asian Games | Nagoya | |
| (North Korea) Ro Kwang-ryol | 215 | 2 November 2026 | World Championships | Ningbo | |

=== Total ===
| Athlete | Record (kg) | Date | Meet | Place | Ref. |
|---|---|---|---|---|---|
| World Standard | 374 | 1 August 2026 | — | — | |
| (Egypt) Abdelrahman Younes | 377 | 1 September 2026 | Mediterranean Games | San Giorgio Ionico | |
| (Kazakhstan) Alexey Churkin | 378 | 28 September 2026 | Asian Games | Nagoya | |
| (North Korea) Ro Kwang-ryol | 379 | 28 September 2026 | Asian Games | Nagoya | |
| (Colombia) Yeison López | 383 | 6 October 2026 | Pan American Games Qualifier | Tepic | |
| (Egypt) Abdelrahman Younes | 381 | 2 November 2026 | World Championships | Ningbo | |
| (Colombia) Yeison López | 383 | 2 November 2026 | World Championships | Ningbo | |
| (Egypt) Abdelrahman Younes | 385 | 2 November 2026 | World Championships | Ningbo | |
| (Colombia) Yeison López | 387 | 2 November 2026 | World Championships | Ningbo | |
| (Egypt) Abdelrahman Younes | 390 | 2 November 2026 | World Championships | Ningbo | |

== 95 kg ==
=== Snatch ===
| Athlete | Record (kg) | Date | Meet | Place | Ref. |
|---|---|---|---|---|---|
| World Standard | 181 | 1 August 2026 | — | — | |
| (Kazakhstan) Nurgissa Adiletuly | 182 | 4 November 2026 | World Championships | Ningbo | |
| (Bulgaria) Karlos Nasar | 185 | 4 November 2026 | World Championships | Ningbo | |

=== Clean & Jerk ===
| Athlete | Record (kg) | Date | Meet | Place | Ref. |
|---|---|---|---|---|---|
| World Standard | 220 | 1 August 2026 | — | — | |
| (Bulgaria) Karlos Nasar | 230 | 4 November 2026 | World Championships | Ningbo | |

=== Total ===
| Athlete | Record (kg) | Date | Meet | Place | Ref. |
|---|---|---|---|---|---|
| World Standard | 395 | 1 August 2026 | — | — | |
| (Iran) Ali Alipour | 398 | 28 September 2026 | Asian Games | Nagoya | |
| (Kazakhstan) Nurgissa Adiletuly | 399 | 4 November 2026 | World Championships | Ningbo | |
| (Bulgaria) Karlos Nasar | 405 | 4 November 2026 | World Championships | Ningbo | |
| (Bulgaria) Karlos Nasar | 415 | 4 November 2026 | World Championships | Ningbo | |

== 110 kg ==
=== Snatch ===
| Athlete | Record (kg) | Date | Meet | Place | Ref. |
|---|---|---|---|---|---|
| World Standard | 195 | 1 June 2025 | — | — | |
| (Uzbekistan) Akbar Djuraev | 196 | 10 October 2025 | World Championships | Førde | |
| (Uzbekistan) Akbar Djuraev | 197 | 29 September 2026 | Asian Games | Nagoya | |
| (Uzbekistan) Akbar Djuraev | 198 | 6 November 2026 | World Championships | Ningbo | |

=== Clean & Jerk ===
| Athlete | Record (kg) | Date | Meet | Place | Ref. |
|---|---|---|---|---|---|
| World Standard | 237 | 1 June 2025 | — | — | |

=== Total ===
| Athlete | Record (kg) | Date | Meet | Place | Ref. |
|---|---|---|---|---|---|
| World Standard | 427 | 1 June 2025 | — | — | |
| (Uzbekistan) Akbar Djuraev | 428 | 10 October 2025 | World Championships | Førde | |
| (Uzbekistan) Akbar Djuraev | 432 | 6 November 2026 | World Championships | Ningbo | |

== +110 kg ==
=== Snatch ===
| Athlete | Record (kg) | Date | Meet | Place | Ref. |
|---|---|---|---|---|---|
| World Standard | 218 | 1 June 2025 | — | — | |
| (Iraq) Ali Ammar | 219 | 29 September 2026 | Asian Games | Nagoya | |

=== Clean & Jerk ===
| Athlete | Record (kg) | Date | Meet | Place | Ref. |
|---|---|---|---|---|---|
| World Standard | 260 | 1 June 2025 | — | — | |
| (Iran) Alireza Yousefi | 261 | 17 May 2026 | Asian Championships | Gandhinagar | |
| (Iran) Alireza Yousefi | 263 | 8 November 2026 | World Championships | Ningbo | |

=== Total ===
| Athlete | Record (kg) | Date | Meet | Place | Ref. |
|---|---|---|---|---|---|
| World Standard | 477 | 1 June 2025 | — | — | |

== June 2025 – August 2026 records ==
Following the introduction of the new bodyweight categories from 1 August 2026, the International Weightlifting Federation announced the new World Standards for the new weights but kept the records for those bodyweight categories that remained unchanged from the previous revision.

=== 71 kg ===
Snatch

| Athlete | Record (kg) | Date | Meet | Place | Ref. |
|---|---|---|---|---|---|
| World Standard | 156 | 1 June 2025 | — | — | |
| (China) He Yueji | 157 | 5 October 2025 | World Championships | Førde | |
| (China) He Yueji | 160 | 5 October 2025 | World Championships | Førde | |

Clean & Jerk

| Athlete | Record (kg) | Date | Meet | Place | Ref. |
|---|---|---|---|---|---|
| World Standard | 190 | 1 June 2025 | — | — | |
| (Colombia) Sebastián Olivares | 191 | 15 July 2025 | Pan American Championships | Cali | |
| (Turkey) Yusuf Fehmi Genç | 192 | 5 October 2025 | World Championships | Førde | |
| (Japan) Masanori Miyamoto | 193 | 5 October 2025 | World Championships | Førde | |
| (Thailand) Weeraphon Wichuma | 194 | 5 October 2025 | World Championships | Førde | |
| (Thailand) Weeraphon Wichuma | 195 | 14 December 2025 | SEA Games | Chonburi | |
| (North Korea) Ri Won-ju | 197 | 14 May 2026 | Asian Championships | Gandhinagar | |

Total

| Athlete | Record (kg) | Date | Meet | Place | Ref. |
|---|---|---|---|---|---|
| World Standard | 340 | 1 June 2025 | — | — | |
| (China) He Yueji | 341 | 5 October 2025 | World Championships | Førde | |
| (China) He Yueji | 344 | 5 October 2025 | World Championships | Førde | |
| (Japan) Masanori Miyamoto | 345 | 5 October 2025 | World Championships | Førde | |
| (Thailand) Weeraphon Wichuma | 346 | 5 October 2025 | World Championships | Førde | |
| (Thailand) Weeraphon Wichuma | 347 | 14 December 2025 | SEA Games | Chonburi | |
| (North Korea) Ri Won-ju | 348 | 14 May 2026 | Asian Championships | Gandhinagar | |
| (North Korea) Ri Won-ju | 351 | 14 May 2026 | Asian Championships | Gandhinagar | |

=== 79 kg ===
Snatch

| Athlete | Record (kg) | Date | Meet | Place | Ref. |
|---|---|---|---|---|---|
| World Standard | 165 | 1 June 2025 | — | — | |
| (Egypt) Abdelrahman Younes | 166 | 10 November 2025 | Islamic Solidarity Games | Riyadh | |

Clean & Jerk

| Athlete | Record (kg) | Date | Meet | Place | Ref. |
|---|---|---|---|---|---|
| World Standard | 202 | 1 June 2025 | — | — | |
| (Indonesia) Rahmat Erwin Abdullah | 203 | 6 October 2025 | World Championships | Førde | |
| (Indonesia) Rizki Juniansyah | 204 | 6 October 2025 | World Championships | Førde | |
| (Indonesia) Rizki Juniansyah | 205 | 15 December 2025 | SEA Games | Chonburi | |
| (North Korea) Ri Ryong-hyon | 206 | 14 May 2026 | Asian Championships | Gandhinagar | |

Total

| Athlete | Record (kg) | Date | Meet | Place | Ref. |
|---|---|---|---|---|---|
| World Standard | 361 | 1 June 2025 | — | — | |
| (Egypt) Abdelrahman Younes | 362 | 10 November 2025 | Islamic Solidarity Games | Riyadh | |
| (Indonesia) Rizki Juniansyah | 365 | 15 December 2025 | SEA Games | Chonburi | |

=== 88 kg ===
Snatch

| Athlete | Record (kg) | Date | Meet | Place | Ref. |
|---|---|---|---|---|---|
| World Standard | 175 | 1 June 2025 | — | — | |
| (Colombia) Yeison López | 176 | 16 July 2025 | Pan American Championships | Cali | |
| (Colombia) Yeison López | 177 | 7 October 2025 | World Championships | Førde | |
| (Colombia) Yeison López | 178 | 29 April 2026 | Pan American Championships | Panama City | |
| (Colombia) Yeison López | 181 | 29 April 2026 | Pan American Championships | Panama City | |
| (Egypt) Abdelrahman Younes | 182 | 15 May 2026 | African Championships | Ismailia | |

Clean & Jerk

| Athlete | Record (kg) | Date | Meet | Place | Ref. |
|---|---|---|---|---|---|
| World Standard | 214 | 1 June 2025 | — | — | |
| (North Korea) Ro Kwang-ryol | 215 | 7 October 2025 | World Championships | Førde | |
| (Colombia) Yeison López | 216 | 29 April 2026 | Pan American Championships | Panama City | |
| (North Korea) Ro Kwang-ryol | 217 | 15 May 2026 | Asian Championships | Gandhinagar | |
| (North Korea) Ro Kwang-ryol | 220 | 15 May 2026 | Asian Championships | Gandhinagar | |

Total

| Athlete | Record (kg) | Date | Meet | Place | Ref. |
|---|---|---|---|---|---|
| World Standard | 383 | 1 June 2025 | — | — | |
| (Colombia) Yeison López | 387 | 7 October 2025 | World Championships | Førde | |
| (Colombia) Yeison López | 397 | 29 April 2026 | Pan American Championships | Panama City | |

=== 94 kg ===
Snatch

| Athlete | Record (kg) | Date | Meet | Place | Ref. |
|---|---|---|---|---|---|
| World Standard | 181 | 1 June 2025 | — | — | |
| (Iran) Alireza Moeini | 182 | 9 October 2025 | World Championships | Førde | |

Clean & Jerk

| Athlete | Record (kg) | Date | Meet | Place | Ref. |
|---|---|---|---|---|---|
| World Standard | 221 | 1 June 2025 | — | — | |
| (Bulgaria) Karlos Nasar | 222 | 9 October 2025 | World Championships | Førde | |

Total

| Athlete | Record (kg) | Date | Meet | Place | Ref. |
|---|---|---|---|---|---|
| World Standard | 396 | 1 June 2025 | — | — | |

== See also ==
- World record progression men's weightlifting (1998–2018)
- World record progression men's weightlifting (1993–1997)
- World record progression women's weightlifting
- World record progression women's weightlifting (1998–2018)
