= List of Panamerican records in Olympic weightlifting =

The Pan American records in Olympic weightlifting are maintained in each weight class for the snatch lift, clean & jerk lift, and the total for both lifts by the Pan American Weightlifting Federation (PAWF).

== Current records ==
Key to tables: Awaiting ratification Not ratified or later rescinded by PAWF

=== Men ===
Event	Record	Athlete	Nation	Date	Meet	Place	Ref
60 kg
Snatch	131 kg	PAWF Standard					
Clean & Jerk	163 kg	PAWF Standard					
Total	292 kg	PAWF Standard					
65 kg
Snatch	139 kg	PAWF Standard					
Snatch	143 kg	Hampton Morris	United States	28 October 2026	World Championships	Ningbo, China	
Clean & Jerk	181 kg	Hampton Morris	United States	14 July 2025	Pan American Championships	Cali, Colombia	
Clean & Jerk	185 kg	Hampton Morris	United States	28 October 2026	World Championships	Ningbo, China	
Total	320 kg	Francisco Mosquera	Colombia	27 April 2026	Pan American Championships	Panama City, Panama	
Total	328 kg	Hampton Morris	United States	28 October 2026	World Championships	Ningbo, China	
70 kg
Snatch	145 kg	PAWF Standard					
Snatch	146 kg	Luis Javier Mosquera	Colombia	5 October 2026	Pan American Games Qualifier	Tepic, Mexico	
Clean & Jerk	183 kg	PAWF Standard					
Total	326 kg	PAWF Standard					
75 kg
Snatch	152 kg	PAWF Standard					
Snatch	155 kg	Hugo Montes	Colombia	5 October 2026	Pan American Games Qualifier	Tepic, Mexico	
Snatch	158 kg	Hugo Montes	Colombia	31 October 2026	World Championships	Ningbo, China	
Clean & Jerk	190 kg	PAWF Standard					
Total	340 kg	PAWF Standard					
Total	341 kg	Hugo Montes	Colombia	5 October 2026	Pan American Games Qualifier	Tepic, Mexico	
Total	346 kg	Hugo Montes	Colombia	31 October 2026	World Championships	Ningbo, China	
85 kg
Snatch	165 kg	PAWF Standard					
Snatch	166 kg	Ángel Rodríguez	Venezuela	29 August 2026	South American Junior Championships	Guayaquil, Ecuador	
Snatch	173 kg	Yeison López	Colombia	6 October 2026	Pan American Games Qualifier	Tepic, Mexico	
Snatch	178 kg	Yeison López	Colombia	2 November 2026	World Championships	Ningbo, China	
Clean & Jerk	203 kg	PAWF Standard					
Clean & Jerk	209 kg	Yeison López	Colombia	2 November 2026	World Championships	Ningbo, China	
Clean & Jerk	210 kg	Yeison López	Colombia	6 October 2026	Pan American Games Qualifier	Tepic, Mexico	
Total	367 kg	Ángel Rodríguez	Venezuela	16 September 2026	South American Games	Rosario, Argentina	
Total	383 kg	Yeison López	Colombia	6 October 2026	Pan American Games Qualifier	Tepic, Mexico	
Total	387 kg	Yeison López	Colombia	2 November 2026	World Championships	Ningbo, China	
95 kg
Snatch	176 kg	PAWF Standard					
Clean & Jerk	215 kg	PAWF Standard					
Total	387 kg	PAWF Standard					
110 kg
Snatch	189 kg	PAWF Standard					
Clean & Jerk	228 kg	Matheus Pessanha	Brazil	30 April 2026	Pan American Championships	Panama City, Panama	
Total	408 kg	Matheus Pessanha	Brazil	30 April 2026	Pan American Championships	Panama City, Panama	
+110 kg
Snatch	193 kg	PAWF Standard					
Clean & Jerk	230 kg	Rafael Cerro	Colombia	17 September 2026	South American Games	Rosario, Argentina	
Total	419 kg	Rafael Cerro	Colombia	30 April 2026	Pan American Championships	Panama City, Panama	

=== Women ===
Event	Record	Athlete	Nation	Date	Meet	Place	Ref
49 kg
Snatch	87 kg	PAWF Standard					
Clean & Jerk	109 kg	PAWF Standard					
Total	196 kg	PAWF Standard					
53 kg
Snatch	96 kg	Miranda Ulrey	United States	27 April 2026	Pan American Championships	Panama City, Panama	
Snatch	98 kg	Miranda Ulrey	United States	29 October 2026	World Championships	Ningbo, China	
Clean & Jerk	120 kg	Miranda Ulrey	United States	27 April 2026	Pan American Championships	Panama City, Panama	
Clean & Jerk	122 kg	Miranda Ulrey	United States	29 October 2026	World Championships	Ningbo, China	
Total	216 kg	Miranda Ulrey	United States	27 April 2026	Pan American Championships	Panama City, Panama	
Total	220 kg	Miranda Ulrey	United States	29 October 2026	World Championships	Ningbo, China	
57 kg
Snatch	98 kg	PAWF Standard					
Clean & Jerk	122 kg	PAWF Standard					
Total	220 kg	PAWF Standard					
61 kg
Snatch	105 kg	Karen Mosquera	Colombia	15 September 2026	South American Games	Rosario, Argentina	
Snatch	111 kg	Karen Mosquera	Colombia	1 November 2026	World Championships	Ningbo, China	
Clean & Jerk	128 kg	PAWF Standard					
Total	230 kg	PAWF Standard					
Total	236 kg	Karen Mosquera	Colombia	1 November 2026	World Championships	Ningbo, China	
69 kg
Snatch	119 kg	Olivia Reeves	United States	16 July 2025	Pan American Championships	Cali, Colombia	
Clean & Jerk	149 kg	Olivia Reeves	United States	16 July 2025	Pan American Championships	Cali, Colombia	
Total	268 kg	Olivia Reeves	United States	16 July 2025	Pan American Championships	Cali, Colombia	
77 kg
Snatch	123 kg	Olivia Reeves	United States	8 October 2025	World Championships	Førde, Norway	
Clean & Jerk	155 kg	Olivia Reeves	United States	8 October 2025	World Championships	Førde, Norway	
Total	278 kg	Olivia Reeves	United States	8 October 2025	World Championships	Førde, Norway	
86 kg
Snatch	123 kg	Yudelina Mejía	Dominican Republic	17 July 2025	Pan American Championships	Cali, Colombia	
Clean & Jerk	151 kg	PAWF Standard					
Total	271 kg	Yudelina Mejía	Dominican Republic	9 October 2025	World Championships	Førde, Norway	
+86 kg
Snatch	125 kg	PAWF Standard					
Clean & Jerk	162 kg	Marifélix Sarría	Cuba	18 July 2025	Pan American Championships	Cali, Colombia	
Total	281 kg	Lisseth Ayoví	Ecuador	30 April 2026	Pan American Championships	Panama City, Panama	

== Historical records ==
=== Men (2025–2026) ===
Event	Record	Athlete	Nation	Date	Meet	Place	Ref
71 kg
Snatch	150 kg	Reinner Arango	Venezuela	23 November 2025	Bolivarian Games	Lima, Peru	
Clean & Jerk	191 kg	Sebastián Olivares	Colombia	15 July 2025	Pan American Championships	Cali, Colombia	
Total	337 kg	Sebastián Olivares	Colombia	15 July 2025	Pan American Championships	Cali, Colombia	
79 kg
Snatch	159 kg	PAWF Standard					
Clean & Jerk	204 kg	Caden Cahoy	United States	28 April 2026	Pan American Championships	Panama City, Panama	
Total	357 kg	Julio Mayora	Venezuela	15 July 2025	Pan American Championships	Cali, Colombia	
88 kg
Snatch	181 kg	Yeison López	Colombia	29 April 2026	Pan American Championships	Panama City, Panama	
Snatch	182 kg	Yeison López	Colombia	7 August 2026	CAC Games	Santo Domingo, Dominican Republic	
Clean & Jerk	216 kg	Yeison López	Colombia	29 April 2026	Pan American Championships	Panama City, Panama	
Total	397 kg	Yeison López	Colombia	29 April 2026	Pan American Championships	Panama City, Panama	
94 kg
Snatch	177 kg	Keydomar Vallenilla	Venezuela	29 April 2026	Pan American Championships	Panama City, Panama	
Clean & Jerk	216 kg	Keydomar Vallenilla	Venezuela	24 November 2025	Bolivarian Games	Lima, Peru	
Total	392 kg	Keydomar Vallenilla	Venezuela	24 November 2025	Bolivarian Games	Lima, Peru	

=== Men (2018–2025) ===
Event	Record	Athlete	Nation	Date	Meet	Place	Ref
55 kg
Snatch	121 kg	Thiago Silva	Brazil	6 December 2024	World Championships	Manama, Bahrain	
Clean & Jerk	148 kg	Thiago Silva	Brazil	6 December 2024	World Championships	Manama, Bahrain	
Total	269 kg	Thiago Silva	Brazil	6 December 2024	World Championships	Manama, Bahrain	
61 kg
Snatch	135 kg	Francisco Mosquera	Colombia	3 November 2018	World Championships	Ashgabat, Turkmenistan	
Clean & Jerk	176 kg	Hampton Morris	United States	2 April 2024	World Cup	Phuket, Thailand	
Total	304 kg	Francisco Mosquera	Colombia	3 November 2018	World Championships	Ashgabat, Turkmenistan	
67 kg
Snatch	151 kg	Luis Javier Mosquera	Colombia	25 July 2021	Olympic Games	Tokyo, Japan	
Clean & Jerk	183 kg	Óscar Figueroa	Colombia	5 December 2018	International CSLP Cup	Guayaquil, Ecuador	
Total	331 kg	Luis Javier Mosquera	Colombia	25 July 2021	Olympic Games	Tokyo, Japan	
73 kg
Snatch	160 kg	Julio Mayora	Venezuela	2 July 2022	Bolivarian Games	Valledupar, Colombia	
Clean & Jerk	194 kg	Julio Mayora	Venezuela	28 July 2019	Pan American Games	Lima, Peru	
Total	349 kg	Julio Mayora	Venezuela	28 July 2019	Pan American Games	Lima, Peru	
81 kg
Snatch	168 kg	Brayan Rodallegas	Colombia	21 April 2021	Pan American Championships	Santo Domingo, Dominican Republic	
Clean & Jerk	206 kg	Zacarías Bonnat	Dominican Republic	6 March 2020	Manuel Suárez In Memoriam	Havana, Cuba	
Total	368 kg	Zacarías Bonnat	Dominican Republic	6 March 2020	Manuel Suárez In Memoriam	Havana, Cuba	
89 kg
Snatch	182 kg	Yeison López	Colombia	6 April 2024	World Cup	Phuket, Thailand	
Clean & Jerk	212 kg	Keydomar Vallenilla	Venezuela	30 March 2023	Pan American Championships	Bariloche, Argentina	
Total	392 kg	Yeison López	Colombia	6 April 2024	World Cup	Phuket, Thailand	
96 kg
Snatch	187 kg	Lesman Paredes	Colombia	14 December 2021	World Championships	Tashkent, Uzbekistan	
Clean & Jerk	216 kg	Keydomar Vallenilla	Venezuela	4 October 2022	South American Games	Asunción, Paraguay	
Total	400 kg	Lesman Paredes	Colombia	14 December 2021	World Championships	Tashkent, Uzbekistan	
102 kg
Snatch	181 kg	Lesman Paredes	Colombia	6 November 2021	Pan American Championships	Guayaquil, Ecuador	
Clean & Jerk	215 kg	Matheus Pessanha	Brazil	26 September 2024	World Junior Championships	León, Spain	
Clean & Jerk	220 kg	Matheus Pessanha	Brazil	4 May 2025	World Junior Championships	Lima, Peru	
Total	390 kg	Lesman Paredes	Colombia	23 April 2021	Pan American Championships	Santo Domingo, Dominican Republic	
Total	395 kg	Matheus Pessanha	Brazil	4 May 2025	World Junior Championships	Lima, Peru	
109 kg
Snatch	190 kg	Jorge Arroyo	Ecuador	29 July 2019	Pan American Games	Lima, Peru	
Clean & Jerk	223 kg	Wesley Kitts	United States	26 April 2019	Pan American Championships	Guatemala City, Guatemala	
Total	399 kg	Wesley Kitts	United States	26 April 2019	Pan American Championships	Guatemala City, Guatemala	
+109 kg
Snatch	201 kg	Fernando Reis	Brazil	10 November 2018	World Championships	Ashgabat, Turkmenistan	
Clean & Jerk	235 kg	Fernando Reis	Brazil	10 November 2018	World Championships	Ashgabat, Turkmenistan	
Total	436 kg	Fernando Reis	Brazil	10 November 2018	World Championships	Ashgabat, Turkmenistan	

=== Men (1998–2018) ===
Event	Record	Athlete	Nation	Date	Meet	Place	Ref
-56 kg
Snatch	130 kg	William Vargas	Cuba	7 May 1998	Manuel Suarez Tournament	Pinar del Río, Cuba	
Clean & Jerk	157 kg	Sergio Álvarez	Cuba	4 September 2000	Manuel Suarez Tournament	Holguín, Cuba	
Total	285 kg	William Vargas	Cuba	7 May 1998	Manuel Suarez Tournament	Pinar del Río, Cuba	
-62 kg
Snatch	142 kg	Óscar Figueroa	Colombia	8 August 2016	Olympic Games	Rio de Janeiro, Brazil	
Clean & Jerk	177 kg	Óscar Figueroa	Colombia	30 July 2012	Olympic Games	London, United Kingdom	
Total	318 kg	Óscar Figueroa	Colombia	8 August 2016	Olympic Games	Rio de Janeiro, Brazil	
-69 kg
Snatch	155 kg	Luis Javier Mosquera	Colombia	9 August 2016	Olympic Games	Rio de Janeiro, Brazil	
Clean & Jerk	188 kg	Bredni Roque	Mexico	7 June 2016	Pan American Championships	Cartagena, Colombia	
Total	338 kg	Luis Javier Mosquera	Colombia	8 June 2015	Junior World Championships	Wrocław, Poland	
-77 kg
Snatch	162 kg	Yeison López	Colombia	25 July 2017	Pan American Championships	Miami, United States	
Clean & Jerk	205 kg	Idalberto Aranda	Cuba	5 August 1999	Pan American Games	Winnipeg, Canada	
Total	356 kg	Iván Cambar	Cuba	24 November 2009	World Championships	Goyang, South Korea	
-85 kg
Snatch	175 kg	Arley Méndez	Chile	3 December 2017	World Championships	Anaheim, United States	
Clean & Jerk	212 kg	Arley Méndez	Chile	30 May 2018	South American Games	Cochabamba, Bolivia	
Total	381 kg	Arley Méndez	Chile	17 May 2018	Pan American Championships	Santo Domingo, Dominican Republic	
-94 kg
Snatch	178 kg	Yoandry Hernández	Cuba	17 August 2008	Olympic Games	Beijing, China	
Clean & Jerk	221 kg	Yoandry Hernández	Cuba	17 July 2007	Pan American Games	Rio de Janeiro, Brasil	
Total	395 kg	Julio Luna	Venezuela	15 August 2003	Pan American Games	Santo Domingo, Dominican Republic	
-105 kg
Snatch	190 kg	Jorge Arroyo	Ecuador	18 May 2012	Pan American Championships	Antigua, Guatemala	
Clean & Jerk	227 kg	Ernesto Montoya	Cuba	10 May 1998	Manuel Suarez Tournament	Pinar del Río, Cuba	
Total	405 kg	Jorge Arroyo	Ecuador	18 May 2012	Pan American Championships	Antigua, Guatemala	
+105 kg
Snatch	201 kg	Fernando Reis	Brazil	18 May 2018	Pan American Championships	Santo Domingo, Dominican Republic	
Clean & Jerk	240 kg	Fernando Reis	Brazil	16 August 2016	Olympic Games	Rio de Janeiro, Brazil	
Total	440 kg	Fernando Reis	Brazil	5 December 2017	World Championships	Anaheim, United States	

=== Women (2025–2026) ===
Event	Record	Athlete	Nation	Date	Meet	Place	Ref
48 kg
Snatch	86 kg	Dahiana Ortiz	Dominican Republic	8 December 2025	Central American & Caribbean Championships	Santo Domingo, Dominican Republic	
Clean & Jerk	107 kg	Dahiana Ortiz	Dominican Republic	8 December 2025	Central American & Caribbean Championships	Santo Domingo, Dominican Republic	
Total	193 kg	Dahiana Ortiz	Dominican Republic	8 December 2025	Central American & Caribbean Championships	Santo Domingo, Dominican Republic	
58 kg
Snatch	99 kg	Anyelin Venegas	Venezuela	23 November 2025	Bolivarian Games	Lima, Peru	
Clean & Jerk	123 kg	Génesis Rodríguez	Venezuela	9 December 2025	Central American & Caribbean Championships	Santo Domingo, Dominican Republic	
Total	221 kg	Anyelin Venegas	Venezuela	23 November 2025	Bolivarian Games	Lima, Peru	
63 kg
Snatch	108 kg	Karen Mosquera	Colombia	10 December 2025	Central American & Caribbean Championships	Santo Domingo, Dominican Republic	
Clean & Jerk	133 kg	Maude Charron	Canada	5 October 2025	World Championships	Førde, Norway	
Total	238 kg	Karen Mosquera	Colombia	10 December 2025	Central American & Caribbean Championships	Santo Domingo, Dominican Republic	

=== Women (2018–2025) ===
Event	Record	Athlete	Nation	Date	Meet	Place	Ref
45 kg
Snatch	77 kg	Manuela Berrío	Colombia	5 December 2022	World Championships	Bogotá, Colombia	
Clean & Jerk	96 kg	Manuela Berrío	Colombia	9 May 2019	South American, Ibero-American & Open Championships	Palmira, Colombia	
Total	172 kg	Manuela Berrío	Colombia	1 July 2022	Bolivarian Games	Valledupar, Colombia	
49 kg
Snatch	89 kg	Jourdan Delacruz	United States	20 April 2021	Pan American Championships	Santo Domingo, Dominican Republic	
Clean & Jerk	112 kg	Jourdan Delacruz	United States	27 March 2023	Pan American Championships	Bariloche, Argentina	
Total	200 kg	Jourdan Delacruz	United States	20 April 2021	Pan American Championships	Santo Domingo, Dominican Republic	
55 kg
Snatch	96 kg	Génesis Rodríguez	Venezuela	5 December 2018	International CSLP Cup	Guayaquil, Ecuador	
Clean & Jerk	116 kg	Alexandra Escobar	Ecuador	3 November 2018	World Championships	Ashgabat, Turkmenistan	
Total	212 kg	Génesis Rodríguez	Venezuela	28 July 2019	Pan American Games	Lima, Peru	
59 kg
Snatch	106 kg	Maude Charron	Canada	3 April 2024	World Cup	Phuket, Thailand	
Clean & Jerk	133 kg	Yenny Álvarez	Colombia	8 December 2022	World Championships	Bogotá, Colombia	
Total	236 kg	Maude Charron	Canada	3 April 2024	World Cup	Phuket, Thailand	
64 kg
Snatch	107 kg	Maude Charron	Canada	21 April 2021	Pan American Championships	Santo Domingo, Dominican Republic	
Clean & Jerk	133 kg	Maude Charron	Canada	21 April 2021	Pan American Championships	Santo Domingo, Dominican Republic	
Total	240 kg	Maude Charron	Canada	21 April 2021	Pan American Championships	Santo Domingo, Dominican Republic	
71 kg
Snatch	121 kg	Angie Palacios	Ecuador	14 June 2023	IWF Grand Prix	Havana, Cuba	
Clean & Jerk	150 kg	Olivia Reeves	United States	7 April 2024	World Cup	Phuket, Thailand	
Total	268 kg	Olivia Reeves	United States	7 April 2024	World Cup	Phuket, Thailand	
76 kg
Snatch	118 kg	Neisi Dájomes	Ecuador	13 May 2021	Ibero-American Championships	Cali, Colombia	
Clean & Jerk	146 kg	Leydi Solís	Colombia	7 November 2018	World Championships	Ashgabat, Turkmenistan	
Total	263 kg	Neisi Dájomes	Ecuador	1 August 2021	Olympic Games	Tokyo, Japan	
81 kg
Snatch	123 kg	Neisi Dájomes	Ecuador	9 April 2024	World Cup	Phuket, Thailand	
Clean & Jerk	149 kg	Tamara Salazar	Ecuador	16 June 2023	IWF Grand Prix	Havana, Cuba	
Total	269 kg	Neisi Dájomes	Ecuador	9 April 2024	World Cup	Phuket, Thailand	
87 kg
Snatch	117 kg	Crismery Santana	Dominican Republic	30 July 2019	Pan American Games	Lima, Peru	
Clean & Jerk	150 kg	Tamara Salazar	Ecuador	2 August 2021	Olympic Games	Tokyo, Japan	
Total	263 kg	Tamara Salazar	Ecuador	2 August 2021	Olympic Games	Tokyo, Japan	
+87 kg
Snatch	130 kg	Verónica Saladín	Dominican Republic	30 July 2019	Pan American Games	Lima, Peru	
Clean & Jerk	163 kg	Mary Theisen-Lappen	United States	14 December 2023	IWF Grand Prix	Doha, Qatar	
Clean & Jerk	163 kg	Mary Theisen-Lappen	United States	6 March 2022	USAW North American Open Series 1	Columbus, United States	
Total	290 kg	Sarah Robles	United States	10 November 2018	World Championships	Ashgabat, Turkmenistan	

=== Women (1998–2018) ===
Event	Record	Athlete	Nation	Date	Meet	Place	Ref
-48 kg
Snatch	86 kg	Beatriz Pirón	Dominican Republic	19 September 2017	Central American and Caribbean Championships	Guatemala City, Guatemala	
Clean & Jerk	103 kg	Ana Segura	Colombia	11 July 2015	Pan American Games	Toronto, Canada	
Total	188 kg	Beatriz Pirón	Dominican Republic	20 August 2017	Universiade	New Taipei City, Taiwan	
-53 kg
Snatch	97 kg	Yuderqui Contreras	Dominican Republic	29 May 2014	Pan American Championships	Santo Domingo, Dominican Republic	
Clean & Jerk	117 kg	Yuderqui Contreras	Dominican Republic	19 July 2010	Central American and Caribbean Games	Mayagüez, Puerto Rico	
Total	213 kg	Yuderqui Contreras	Dominican Republic	19 July 2010	Central American and Caribbean Games	Mayagüez, Puerto Rico	
-58 kg
Snatch	103 kg	Alexandra Escobar	Ecuador	30 July 2012	Olympic Games	London, Great Britain	
Clean & Jerk	128 kg	Jackelina Heredia	Colombia	13 May 2012	Pan American Championships	Antigua, Guatemala	
Total	227 kg	Alexandra Escobar	Ecuador	19 July 2010	World Championships	Antalya, Turkey	
-63 kg
Snatch	106 kg	Christine Girard	Canada	25 October 2011	Pan American Games	Guadalajara, Mexico	
Clean & Jerk	135 kg	Nísida Palomeque	Colombia	25 October 2011	Pan American Games	Guadalajara, Mexico	
Total	238 kg	Christine Girard	Canada	25 October 2011	Pan American Games	Guadalajara, Mexico	
-69 kg
Snatch	112 kg	Tulia Medina	Colombia	19 November 2003	World Championships	Vancouver, Canada	
Clean & Jerk	145 kg	Leydi Solís	Colombia	14 July 2015	Pan American Games	Toronto, Canada	
Total	256 kg	Leydi Solís	Colombia	14 July 2015	Pan American Games	Toronto, Canada	
-75 kg
Snatch	115 kg	Nora Koppel	Argentina	13 November 2005	World Championships	Doha, Qatar	
Clean & Jerk	148 kg^{1}	Nora Koppel	Argentina	13 May 2008	African Championships	Strand, South Africa	
Total	263 kg^{1}	Nora Koppel	Argentina	13 May 2008	African Championships	Strand, South Africa	
-90 kg
Snatch	116 kg	Crismery Santana	Dominican Republic	18 May 2018	Pan American Championships	Santo Domingo, Dominican Republic	
Clean & Jerk	146 kg	María Valdés	Chile	4 December 2017	World Championships	Anaheim, United States	
Total	258 kg	Crismery Santana	Dominican Republic	18 May 2018	Pan American Championships	Santo Domingo, Dominican Republic	
+90 kg
Snatch	128 kg	Cheryl Haworth	United States	18 May 2003	National Championships	Chattanooga, United States	
Clean & Jerk	161 kg	Cheryl Haworth	United States	27 June 2005	Pan American Championships	Shreveport, United States	
Total	287 kg	Cheryl Haworth	United States	27 June 2005	Pan American Championships	Shreveport, United States	

- ^1 Koppel was not part of the official competition as Argentina is not an African country and her results were not recorded by the IWF. It's unclear why and how Koppel competed there and why the PAWC recognizes the results.
