= Weightlifting at the 2019 Pan American Games – Women's 49 kg =

Weightlifting – Women's 49kg at the 2019 Pan American Games
- Venue: Coliseo Mariscal Caceres
- Dates: July 27
- Competitors: 11 from 10 nations

Medalists
Gold medal	Beatriz Pirón	Dominican Republic
Silver medal	Ana Segura	Colombia
Bronze medal	Santa Cotes	Dominican Republic

The women's 49 kg competition of the weightlifting events at the 2019 Pan American Games in Lima, Peru, was held on July 27 at the Coliseo Mariscal Caceres.

== Results ==
11 athletes from ten countries took part.

Rank	Athlete	Nation	Group	Snatch (kg)				Clean & Jerk (kg)				Total
Rank	Athlete	Nation	Group	1	2	3	Result	1	2	3	Result	Total
1st place, gold medalist(s)	Beatriz Pirón	Dominican Republic	A	82	85	87	87	100	104	106	106	193
2nd place, silver medalist(s)	Ana Segura	Colombia	A	~~80~~	80	83	83	100	105	~~111~~	105	188
3rd place, bronze medalist(s)	Santa Cotes	Dominican Republic	A	~~74~~	74	80	80	91	95	97	97	177
4	Nathasha Figueiredo	Brazil	A	75	78	80	80	~~90~~	96	~~98~~	96	176
5	Ludia Montero	Cuba	A	76	80	82	82	93	~~96~~	~~97~~	93	175
6	Margoth Reynoso	Guatemala	A	70	73	75	75	88	~~92~~	~~92~~	88	163
7	Katherine Landeros	Chile	A	65	~~68~~	68	68	85	~~90~~	90	90	158
8	Erika Ortega	Panama	A	64	67	70	70	83	~~86~~	~~86~~	83	153
9	María Navarro	Nicaragua	A	60	~~64~~	~~64~~	60	76	80	83	83	143
–	Angélica Campoverde	Ecuador	A	~~73~~	73	76	76	~~94~~	~~94~~	~~94~~	–	–
–	Fiorella Cueva	Peru	A	70	73	75	75	~~95~~	~~95~~	~~95~~	–	–

== New records ==
Snatch	85 kg	Beatriz Pirón (DOM)	AM, PR
Snatch	90 kg	Beatriz Pirón (DOM)	AM, PR
Total	191 kg	Beatriz Pirón (DOM)	AM, PR
Total	193 kg	Beatriz Pirón (DOM)	AM, PR
