= 2024 World Weightlifting Championships – Men's 67 kg =

Men's 67 kg at the 2024 World Weightlifting Championships
- Venue: Weightlifting Marquee Venue
- Location: Manama, Bahrain
- Dates: 7 December (Group C); 8 December (Group A and B)
- Competitors: 27 from 20 nations
- Winning total: 336 kg

Medalists
gold medal	Ri Won-ju	North Korea
silver medal	Pak Pyol	North Korea
bronze medal	Yusuf Fehmi Genç	Turkey

The men's 67 kilograms competition at the 2024 World Weightlifting Championships was held on 7 and 8 December 2024.

== Schedule ==
Date	Time	Event
7 December 2024	13:00	Group C
8 December 2024	12:30	Group B
8 December 2024	17:30	Group A

== Records ==
Prior to this competition, the existing world records were as follows.

World record	Snatch	Huang Minhao (CHN)	155 kg	Tokyo, Japan	6 July 2019
World record	Clean & jerk	Ri Won-ju (PRK)	189 kg	Phuket, Thailand	4 April 2024
World record	Total	Chen Lijun (CHN)	339 kg	Ningbo, China	21 April 2019

== Results ==
Rank	Athlete	Group	Snatch (kg)				Clean & Jerk (kg)				Total
Rank	Athlete	Group	1	2	3	Rank	1	2	3	Rank	Total
1st place, gold medalist(s)	Ri Won-ju (PRK)	A	138	143	146	5	~~182~~	182	190 CWR	1st place, gold medalist(s)	336
2nd place, silver medalist(s)	Pak Pyol (PRK)	A	142	147	150	1st place, gold medalist(s)	182	~~190~~	~~191~~	2nd place, silver medalist(s)	332
3rd place, bronze medalist(s)	Yusuf Fehmi Genç (TUR)	A	141	146	~~149~~	4	~~179~~	181	~~187~~	3rd place, bronze medalist(s)	327
4	Zheng Xinhao (CHN)	A	142	148	~~151~~	2nd place, silver medalist(s)	176	~~180~~	~~181~~	4	324
5	Kaan Kahriman (TUR)	A	143	148; CWJR	~~151~~	3rd place, bronze medalist(s)	170	175	~~177~~	5	323
6	Héctor García (COL)	B	140	145	~~148~~	6	164	~~170~~	~~170~~	10	309
7	Aznil Bidin (MAS)	C	~~130~~	133	137	8	~~165~~	166	171	6	308
8	Seraj Al-Saleem (KSA)	B	131	135	~~138~~	10	162	169	~~172~~	8	304
9	Bae Moon-su (KOR)	B	130	~~135~~	~~135~~	15	170	~~175~~	~~175~~	7	300
10	David Cano (COL)	B	138	~~142~~	~~142~~	7	161	~~165~~	~~166~~	13	299
11	Zhong Yuanlong (CHN)	A	133	137	~~141~~	9	~~162~~	162	~~171~~	11	299
12	Teerawat Ratphet (THA)	C	130	~~134~~	~~134~~	13	155	161	167	9	297
13	Tojonirina Andriatsitohaina (MAD)	A	~~135~~	135	~~140~~	14	160	~~169~~	~~169~~	16	295
14	Eko Yuli Irawan (INA)	B	126	~~131~~	131	12	155	161	~~165~~	14	292
15	Luis Bardalez (PER)	B	126	129	~~131~~	17	160	~~164~~	~~164~~	15	289
16	Hu Jyun-siang (TPE)	C	~~120~~	~~120~~	120	22	~~160~~	161	~~170~~	12	281
17	Mohammad Yasin (INA)	B	~~127~~	127	~~131~~	18	153	~~160~~	~~160~~	18	280
18	Víctor Garrido (ECU)	C	121	~~126~~	126	19	143	148	~~152~~	20	274
19	Víctor Güémez (MEX)	C	116	121	~~125~~	21	146	150	~~154~~	19	271
20	Leowell Cristobal (NMI)	C	101	105	~~109~~	24	138	143	~~145~~	21	248
21	Baki Billah (BAN)	C	102	~~107~~	~~107~~	25	135	~~140~~	~~140~~	22	237
—	Ayoub Salem (TUN)	B	~~130~~	130	~~132~~	16	~~162~~	—	—	—	—
—	Sairamkez Akmolda (KAZ)	A	130	~~135~~	~~135~~	17	~~175~~	~~175~~	—	—	—
—	Valentin Genchev (BUL)	B	~~125~~	125	~~131~~	20	~~160~~	—	—	—	—
—	Han Myeong-mok (KOR)	B	105	110	115	23	—	—	—	—	—
—	Dave Pacaldo (PHI)	B	~~125~~	~~125~~	~~125~~	—	—	—	—	—	—
—	Luis González (PUR)	C	~~122~~	~~122~~	~~122~~	—	150	155	~~160~~	17	—
