= 2025 World Weightlifting Championships – Men's 88 kg =

Men's 88 kg at the 2025 World Weightlifting Championships
- Venue: Førdehuset
- Location: Førde, Norway
- Dates: 7 October
- Winning total: 387 kg CWR

Medalists
gold medal	Yeison López	Colombia
silver medal	Ro Kwang-ryol	North Korea
bronze medal	Marin Robu	Moldova

The men's 88 kilograms competition at the 2025 World Weightlifting Championships was held on 7 October 2025.

== Schedule ==
Date	Time	Event
7 October 2025	10:00	Group C
7 October 2025	12:00	Group B
7 October 2025	17:00	Group A

== Records ==
Prior to this competition, the existing world records were as follows.

World record	Snatch	Yeison López (COL)	176 kg	Cali, Colombia	16 July 2025
World record	Clean & Jerk	World Standard	214 kg	—	1 June 2025
World record	Total	World Standard	383 kg	—	1 June 2025

== Results ==
Rank	Athlete	Group	Snatch (kg)				Clean & Jerk (kg)				Total
Rank	Athlete	Group	1	2	3	Rank	1	2	3	Rank	Total
1st place, gold medalist(s)	Yeison López (COL)	A	173	177 CWR	~~180~~	1st place, gold medalist(s)	~~205~~	205	210 AM	2nd place, silver medalist(s)	387 CWR
2nd place, silver medalist(s)	Ro Kwang-ryol (PRK)	A	162	~~168~~	~~168~~	5	208	211	215 CWR	1st place, gold medalist(s)	377
3rd place, bronze medalist(s)	Marin Robu (MDA)	A	169	~~174~~	~~174~~	3rd place, bronze medalist(s)	200	~~204~~	~~204~~	3rd place, bronze medalist(s)	369
4	Arley Méndez (CHI)	B	165	~~172~~	172	2nd place, silver medalist(s)	~~196~~	196	~~205~~	6	368
5	Lorenzo Tarquini (ITA)	A	155	159	~~163~~	8	~~191~~	191	198	4	357
6	Iliya Salehi (IRI)	A	~~157~~	157	163	4	193	~~202~~	~~202~~	8	356
7	Cristiano Ficco (ITA)	A	155	159	~~163~~	9	193	~~196~~	~~199~~	9	352
8	Hsieh Meng-en (TPE)	B	152	~~156~~	~~156~~	13	192	~~196~~	197	5	349
9	Braydon Kennedy (CAN)	B	~~156~~	156	~~160~~	10	~~180~~	180	185	12	341
10	Brandon Victorian (USA)	B	~~153~~	153	~~157~~	12	~~186~~	187	~~196~~	11	340
11	Alibek Rakhymberdi (KAZ)	B	142	146	~~150~~	18	183	187	190	10	336
12	Artūrs Vasiļonoks (LAT)	B	148	152	~~155~~	14	182	~~189~~	~~191~~	14	334
13	Mauricio Canul (MEX)	B	138	142	146	19	175	181	185	13	331
14	Irmantas Kačinskas (LTU)	B	~~144~~	145	150	16	175	~~180~~	180	16	330
15	Cameron McTaggart (NZL)	B	~~145~~	145	148	17	175	~~178~~	178	18	326 OC
16	Jeremie Ngouanom Nzali (CMR)	C	137	~~145~~	145	20	170	180	~~186~~	15	325
17	Javier González (ESP)	B	~~145~~	145	~~150~~	21	~~180~~	~~180~~	180	17	325
18	Eetu Hautaniemi (FIN)	C	134	138	~~140~~	22	163	~~169~~	169	19	307
19	Bergur Sverrisson (ISL)	C	130	135	~~140~~	23	~~155~~	~~157~~	158	20	293
20	Adrian Henneli (NOR)	C	~~123~~	123	130	24	~~151~~	151	~~157~~	22	281
21	Rylee Borg (MLT)	C	117	120	~~124~~	26	153	157	~~160~~	21	277
22	Franklin Atete (KEN)	C	105	~~112~~	~~114~~	27	125	132	~~138~~	23	237
—	Pan Yunhua (CHN)	A	~~160~~	~~161~~	~~162~~	—	~~202~~	~~205~~	~~206~~	—	—
—	Lucas Müller (GER)	A	154	~~158~~	~~158~~	11	—	—	—	—	—
—	Andranik Karapetyan (BIH)	A	~~168~~	~~168~~	~~173~~	—	—	—	—	—	—
—	Jo Dae-hee (KOR)	A	160	~~166~~	~~168~~	6	~~200~~	~~201~~	~~201~~	—	—
—	Suren Grigoryan (ARM)	A	~~160~~	~~160~~	160	7	~~195~~	~~195~~	~~195~~	—	—
—	Park Hyeon-go (KOR)	A	~~155~~	~~157~~	~~157~~	—	195	~~201~~	~~201~~	7	—
—	Alex Bellemarre (CAN)	B	~~150~~	150	~~154~~	15	—	—	—	—	—
—	Uaealesi Funaki (TON)	C	125	~~130~~	130	25	~~158~~	~~159~~	~~159~~	—	—
—	Sigurd Korsvoll (NOR)	C	~~123~~	~~123~~	~~123~~	—	~~157~~	~~157~~	~~157~~	—	—
—	Said Alioua (MAR)	C	Did not start								
X	Edward Smale (CWF)	C	136	140	143	X	164	~~168~~	168	X	311
X	Christopher Russ (CWF)	C	142	146	~~149~~	X	~~160~~	160	164	X	310
X	Angus Doig (CWF)	C	130	135	~~140~~	X	160	~~165~~	165	X	300
