= Weightlifting at the 2023 Pan American Games – Men's 89 kg =

Weightlifting – Men's 89kg at the 2023 Pan American Games
- Venue: Gimnasio Chimkowe
- Dates: 22 October
- Competitors: 14 from 14 nations

Medalists
Gold medal	Keydomar Vallenilla	Venezuela
Silver medal	Yeison López	Colombia
Bronze medal	Olfides Sáez	Cuba

The men's 89 kg competition of the weightlifting events at the 2023 Pan American Games in Santiago, Chile, was held on 22 October at the Gimnasio Chimkowe.

Each lifter performed in both the snatch and clean and jerk lifts, with the final score being the sum of the lifter's best result in each. The athlete received three attempts in each of the two lifts; the score for the lift was the heaviest weight successfully lifted. This weightlifting event was limited to competitors with a maximum of 89 kilograms of body mass.

== Results ==
The results were as follows:

Rank	Athlete	Nation	Group	Snatch (kg)				Clean & Jerk (kg)				Total
Rank	Athlete	Nation	Group	1	2	3	Result	1	2	3	Result	Total
1st place, gold medalist(s)	Keydomar Vallenilla	Venezuela	A	168	172	~~177~~	172	208	211	–	211	383
2nd place, silver medalist(s)	Yeison López	Colombia	A	168	172	177 AM	177	201	205	~~209~~	205	382
3rd place, bronze medalist(s)	Olfides Sáez	Cuba	A	156	~~161~~	~~161~~	156	195	201	~~205~~	201	357
4	Alex Bellemarre	Canada	A	155	160	165	165	~~185~~	185	191	191	356
5	Arley Méndez	Chile	A	~~160~~	160	~~165~~	160	185	196	~~201~~	196	356
6	Iván Escudero	Ecuador	A	150	155	158	158	~~183~~	184	~~186~~	184	342
7	Brandon Victorian	United States	A	150	~~155~~	~~156~~	150	185	~~191~~	~~191~~	185	335
8	Axe Pavón	Honduras	A	140	~~145~~	~~145~~	140	~~180~~	~~180~~	180	180	320
9	Dante Pizzuti	Argentina	A	139	~~143~~	143	143	171	~~175~~	175	175	318
10	Ray Reyes	Dominican Republic	A	135	~~141~~	~~141~~	135	160	170	~~180~~	170	305
11	Jaime León	Independent Athletes Team	A	120	127	130	130	153	157	161	161	291
12	Daniel Griffith	Barbados	A	112	118	123	123	152	~~158~~	158	158	281
13	Omarie Mears	Jamaica	A	~~118~~	118	~~123~~	118	140	145	149	149	267
14	Shammah Noel	Guyana	A	95	100	~~103~~	100	135	140	145	145	245
