= Ri Won-ju =

North Korean weightlifter (born 2002)

Personal information
- Born: September 17, 2002 (age 24) North Korea
- Height: 1.65 m (5 ft 5 in)
- Weight: 65 kg (143 lb)

Sport
- Country: North Korea
- Sport: Weightlifting

Achievements and titles
- Personal bests: Snatch: 154 kg (2026); Clean & Jerk: 197 kg (2026); Total: 351 kg (2026)
Medal record
Men's weightlifting
Representing North Korea
World Championships
Gold medal – first place	2024 Manama	67 kg
Silver medal – second place	2026 Ningbo	70 kg
Asian Games
Gold medal – first place	2026 Aichi–Nagoya	70 kg
Silver medal – second place	2022 Hangzhou	67 kg
Asian Championships
Gold medal – first place	2024 Tashkent	67 kg
Gold medal – first place	2026 Gandhinagar	71 kg
World Cup
Gold medal – first place	2024 Phuket	67 kg

Korean name
- Hangul: 리원주
- RR: Ri Wonju
- MR: Ri Wŏnju

Ri Won-ju (Korean: 리원주; born 17 September 2002) is a North Korean weightlifter competing in the men's 70 kg category. He won the gold medal in the men's 67 kg event at the 2024 World Weightlifting Championships held in Manama, Bahrain.

== Career ==
Won-ju established a clean & jerk world record of 190 kg at the men's 67 kg category in 2024 IWF World Cup.

At the 2026 World Weightlifting Championships, Won-ju attempted a clean & jerk world record at 205 kg, but dislocated his elbow during the jerk. He won a silver medal at the competition.

== Achievements ==
Year	Venue	Weight	Snatch (kg)				Clean & Jerk (kg)				Total	Rank
Year	Venue	Weight	1	2	3	Rank	1	2	3	Rank	Total	Rank
World Championships
2024	Manama, Bahrain	67 kg	138	143	146	5	~~182~~	182	190 CWR	1st place, gold medalist(s)	336	1st place, gold medalist(s)
2025	Førde, Norway	71 kg	143	148	152	5	~~190~~	190	~~195~~	4	342	5
2026	Ningbo, China	70 kg	147	~~151~~	151	3rd place, bronze medalist(s)	192	~~205~~	—	2nd place, silver medalist(s)	343	2nd place, silver medalist(s)
Asian Championships
2024	Tashkent, Uzbekistan	67 kg	131	137	~~140~~	1st place, gold medalist(s)	170	180	~~189~~	1st place, gold medalist(s)	317	1st place, gold medalist(s)
2026	Ghandinagar, India	71 kg	145	151	154	2nd place, silver medalist(s)	185	194	197; WR	1st place, gold medalist(s)	351; WR	1st place, gold medalist(s)
Asian Games
2022	Hangzhou, China	67 kg	138	141	~~144~~	—N/a	175	180	~~190~~	—N/a	321	2nd place, silver medalist(s)
