= 2024 World Weightlifting Championships – Men's 73 kg =

Men's 73 kg at the 2024 World Weightlifting Championships
- Venue: Weightlifting Marquee Venue
- Location: Manama, Bahrain
- Dates: 9 December
- Competitors: 26 from 22 nations
- Winning total: 349 kg

Medalists
gold medal	Ri Ryong-hyon	North Korea
silver medal	Rizki Juniansyah	Indonesia
bronze medal	Zhong Zhiguang	China

The men's 73 kilograms competition at the 2024 World Weightlifting Championships was held on 9 December 2024.

== Schedule ==
Date	Time	Event
9 December 2024	08:00	Group C
9 December 2024	12:30	Group B
9 December 2024	20:00	Group A

== Records ==
Prior to this competition, the existing world records were as follows.

World Record	Snatch	Shi Zhiyong (CHN)	169 kg	Tashkent, Uzbekistan	20 April 2021
World Record	Clean & Jerk	Rahmat Erwin Abdullah (INA)	204 kg	Tashkent, Uzbekistan	6 February 2024
World Record	Total	Rizki Juniansyah (INA)	365 kg	Phuket, Thailand	4 April 2024

== Results ==
Rank	Athlete	Group	Snatch (kg)				Clean & Jerk (kg)				Total
Rank	Athlete	Group	1	2	3	Rank	1	2	3	Rank	Total
1st place, gold medalist(s)	Ri Ryong-hyon (PRK)	A	147	152	~~155~~	5	191	197	~~205~~	1st place, gold medalist(s)	349
2nd place, silver medalist(s)	Rizki Juniansyah (INA)	B	~~146~~	150	~~160~~	8	180	190	~~200~~	3rd place, bronze medalist(s)	340
3rd place, bronze medalist(s)	Zhong Zhiguang (CHN)	A	140	145	150	10	186	~~192~~	~~192~~	5	336
4	Edwin Lagarejo (COL)	B	148	152	155	1st place, gold medalist(s)	175	180	~~187~~	8	335
5	Karem Ben Hnia (TUN)	A	145	149	~~151~~	11	~~182~~	184	~~188~~	7	333
6	Caden Cahoy (USA)	B	141	145	~~148~~	16	180	~~187~~	187	4	332
7	Roberto Gutu (GER)	A	147	151	154	3rd place, bronze medalist(s)	173	177	~~182~~	10	331
8	Gor Sahakyan (ARM)	A	~~146~~	146	~~151~~	15	185	~~191~~	~~191~~	6	331
9	Lee Sang-yeon (KOR)	A	~~140~~	~~140~~	140	18	185	191	~~195~~	2nd place, silver medalist(s)	331
10	Isa Rustamov (AZE)	B	142	147	150	9	178	~~184~~	~~186~~	9	328
11	Bektimur Reýimow (TKM)	A	~~151~~	151	~~155~~	6	~~175~~	175	~~182~~	13	326
12	Luis Javier Mosquera (COL)	B	150	~~154~~	~~154~~	7	~~174~~	~~174~~	174	14	324
13	Jorge Cárdenas (MEX)	B	145	~~148~~	148	12	175	~~178~~	~~178~~	11	323
14	Tiberiu Donose (ROU)	B	~~145~~	~~145~~	146	14	165	175	~~182~~	12	321
15	Bunýad Raşidow (TKM)	A	~~153~~	154	~~156~~	2nd place, silver medalist(s)	167	~~173~~	~~173~~	16	321
16	Jair Reyes (ECU)	B	140	144	147	13	~~173~~	~~173~~	173	15	320
17	Erry Hidayat Muhammad (MAS)	C	~~135~~	135	~~141~~	19	~~165~~	166	~~174~~	17	301
18	Dian Pampordzhiev (BUL)	C	123	~~127~~	127	23	161	~~165~~	166	18	293
19	Vicente Montoya (MEX)	C	125	130	~~133~~	20	156	161	~~165~~	19	291
20	Sergio Cares (CHI)	C	~~125~~	125	130	22	155	160	~~165~~	20	290
21	Kilian Gallart (ESP)	C	~~130~~	130	~~135~~	21	~~155~~	~~156~~	156	21	286
22	Ahmed Nesaif (BHR)	C	115	~~120~~	120	24	140	~~148~~	148	22	268
23	Mohammed Abdulredha (KUW)	C	~~85~~	85	~~92~~	26	100	110	120	23	205
—	Briken Calja (ALB)	A	~~152~~	~~152~~	153	4	~~183~~	~~183~~	~~183~~	—	—
—	Bak Joo-hyo (KOR)	A	143	~~146~~	~~146~~	17	~~183~~	~~183~~	—	—	—
—	Emmanuel Boateng (GHA)	C	115	~~118~~	~~118~~	25	~~147~~	~~147~~	—		—
