= Weightlifting at the 2026 Asian Games – Men's 85 kg =

Men's 85 kg at the 2026 Asian Games
- Venue: Nagoya Trade & Industry Center
- Date: 28 September 2026
- Competitors: 10 from 10 nations

Medalists
gold medal	Ro Kwang-ryol	North Korea
silver medal	Alexey Churkin	Kazakhstan
bronze medal	Chen Shunnan	China

The men's 85 kilograms competition at the 2026 Asian Games was held on 28 September 2026 at the Nagoya Trade & Industry Center.

== Schedule ==
All times are Japan Standard Time (UTC+09:00)

Date	Time	Event
Monday, 28 September 2026	10:00	Group B
Monday, 28 September 2026	13:30	Group A

== Records ==
Prior to this competition, the existing world, Asian and Games records were as follows.

World Record	Snatch	Abdelrahman Younes (EGY)	172 kg	San Giorgio Ionico, Italy	1 September 2026
World Record	Clean & Jerk	World Standard	208 kg	—	1 August 2026
World Record	Total	Abdelrahman Younes (EGY)	377 kg	San Giorgio Ionico, Italy	1 September 2026
Asian Record	Snatch	Asian Standard	169 kg	—	1 August 2026
Asian Record	Clean & Jerk	Asian Standard	208 kg	—	1 August 2026
Asian Record	Total	Asian Standard	371 kg	—	1 August 2026
Games Record	Snatch	Asian Games Standard	167 kg	—	1 August 2026
Games Record	Clean & Jerk	Asian Games Standard	202 kg	—	1 August 2026
Games Record	Total	Asian Games Standard	364 kg	—	1 August 2026

== Results ==
Legend

- NM — No mark

Rank	Athlete	Group	Snatch (kg)				Clean & Jerk (kg)				Total
Rank	Athlete	Group	1	2	3	Result	1	2	3	Result	Total
1st place, gold medalist(s)	Ro Kwang-ryol (PRK)	A	160	165	~~168~~	165	205	~~214~~	214	214	379
2nd place, silver medalist(s)	Alexey Churkin (KAZ)	A	165	170	173	173	201	205	~~209~~	205	378
3rd place, bronze medalist(s)	Chen Shunnan (CHN)	A	~~163~~	~~163~~	163	163	203	208	211	211	374
4	Rakuei Azuma (JPN)	A	153	~~157~~	157	157	195	202	~~206~~	202	359
5	Mirmostafa Javadi (IRI)	A	158	~~163~~	~~164~~	158	200	~~209~~	~~217~~	200	358
6	Kim Sung-min (KOR)	A	~~155~~	155	~~160~~	155	~~196~~	~~196~~	196	196	351
7	Hsieh Meng-en (TPE)	A	150	~~154~~	~~154~~	150	187	192	~~196~~	192	342
8	Worrapot Nasuriwong (THA)	B	145	~~150~~	~~150~~	145	185	~~190~~	~~190~~	185	330
9	Erry Hidayat (MAS)	B	140	~~145~~	~~145~~	140	~~172~~	172	~~180~~	172	312
—	Khasanboy Bardiev (UZB)	A	~~164~~	~~164~~	~~164~~	—	—	—	—	—	NM

== New records ==
The following records were established during the competition.

Snatch	170	Alexey Churkin (KAZ)	AR
Snatch	173	Alexey Churkin (KAZ)	WR
Clean & Jerk	203	Chen Shunnan (CHN)	GR
Clean & Jerk	205	Ro Kwang-ryol (PRK)	GR
Clean & Jerk	208	Chen Shunnan (CHN)	GR
Clean & Jerk	211	Chen Shunnan (CHN)	WR
Clean & Jerk	214	Ro Kwang-ryol (PRK)	WR
Total	374	Alexey Churkin (KAZ)	AR
Total	378	Alexey Churkin (KAZ)	WR
Total	379	Ro Kwang-ryol (PRK)	WR
