= 2022 World Weightlifting Championships – Men's 109 kg =

Weightlifting competition

The men's 109 kilograms competition at the 2022 World Weightlifting Championships was held on 15 December 2022.

== Schedule ==
Date	Time	Event
15 December 2022	14:00	Group B
15 December 2022	19:00	Group A

== Medalists ==
Event	Gold		Silver		Bronze	
Snatch	Ruslan Nurudinov (UZB)	177 kg	Mehdi Karami (IRI)	176 kg	Aymen Bacha (TUN)	175 kg
Clean & Jerk	Ruslan Nurudinov (UZB)	220 kg	Giorgi Chkheidze (GEO)	219 kg	Rafael Cerro (COL)	214 kg
Total	Ruslan Nurudinov (UZB)	397 kg	Giorgi Chkheidze (GEO)	389 kg	Rafael Cerro (COL)	388 kg

== Records ==
Prior to this competition, the existing world records were as follows.

World record	Snatch	Yang Zhe (CHN)	200 kg	Tashkent, Uzbekistan	24 April 2021
World record	Clean & Jerk	Ruslan Nurudinov (UZB)	241 kg	Tashkent, Uzbekistan	24 April 2021
World record	Total	Simon Martirosyan (ARM)	435 kg	Ashgabat, Turkmenistan	9 November 2018

== Results ==
Rank	Athlete	Group	Snatch (kg)				Clean & Jerk (kg)				Total
Rank	Athlete	Group	1	2	3	Rank	1	2	3	Rank	Total
1st place, gold medalist(s)	Ruslan Nurudinov (UZB)	A	~~177~~	177	~~180~~	1st place, gold medalist(s)	217	~~220~~	220	1st place, gold medalist(s)	397
2nd place, silver medalist(s)	Giorgi Chkheidze (GEO)	A	170	~~175~~	~~175~~	6	210	217	219	2nd place, silver medalist(s)	389
3rd place, bronze medalist(s)	Rafael Cerro (COL)	A	165	~~172~~	174	4	205	~~211~~	214	3rd place, bronze medalist(s)	388
4	Mehdi Karami (IRI)	A	170	174	176	2nd place, silver medalist(s)	210	~~216~~	~~216~~	7	386
5	Aymen Bacha (TUN)	A	~~173~~	175	~~177~~	3rd place, bronze medalist(s)	211	~~215~~	~~215~~	5	386
6	Dong Bing-cheng (TPE)	A	~~163~~	163	167	9	~~202~~	202	211	6	378
7	Zaza Lomtadze (GEO)	A	157	163	166	10	202	~~212~~	212	4	378
8	Paweł Samoraj (POL)	A	169	~~173~~	173	8	~~201~~	202	~~205~~	8	371
9	Óscar Garcés (COL)	A	160	~~170~~	170	7	200	~~210~~	~~212~~	10	370
10	Josué Medina (MEX)	B	155	160	162	11	~~195~~	195	~~200~~	12	357
11	Sargis Martirosjan (AUT)	B	165	170	~~172~~	5	186	~~190~~	~~190~~	14	356
12	Artur Mugurdumov (ISR)	B	~~155~~	155	~~159~~	14	196	201	~~203~~	9	356
13	José Familia (DOM)	B	153	158	161	12	194	~~197~~	~~197~~	13	355
14	Hannes Keskitalo (FIN)	B	150	~~155~~	~~156~~	15	195	~~200~~	~~203~~	11	345
15	Arnas Šidiškis (LTU)	B	150	155	~~160~~	13	180	~~190~~	~~190~~	15	335
—	Hernán Viera (PER)	B	140	~~145~~	145	16	—	—	—	—	—
