= Rafael Cerro (weightlifter) =

Colombian weightlifter (born 1997)

Personal information
- Full name: Rafael de Jesús Cerro Castillo
- Born: 16 May 1997 (age 29)

Sport
- Country: Colombia
- Sport: Weightlifting
- Weight class: +102 kg; 109 kg; +109 kg; +110 kg

Achievements and titles
- Personal bests: Snatch: 193 kg (2026); Clean & jerk: 227 kg AM (2025); Total: 419 kg AM (2026)
Medal record
Representing Colombia
Men's weightlifting
World Championships
Bronze medal – third place	2022 Bogotá	109 kg
Pan American Games
Gold medal – first place	2023 Santiago	+102 kg
Pan American Championships
Gold medal – first place	2024 Caracas	+109 kg
Gold medal – first place	2026 Panama City	+110 kg
Silver medal – second place	2020 Santo Domingo	109 kg
Silver medal – second place	2025 Cali	+110 kg
Central American and Caribbean Games
Gold medal – first place	2023 San Salvador	+109 kg S
Gold medal – first place	2023 San Salvador	+109 kg CJ
Bolivarian Games
Gold medal – first place	2025 Lima-Ayacucho	+110 kg S
Gold medal – first place	2025 Lima-Ayacucho	+110 kg CJ

Rafael de Jesús Cerro Castillo (born 16 May 1997) is a Colombian weightlifter. He won the bronze medal in the men's 109 kg event at the 2022 World Weightlifting Championships held in Bogotá, Colombia. He won the gold medal in the men's +102 kg event at the 2023 Pan American Games held in Santiago, Chile.

In 2020, Cerro won the silver medal in the men's 109 kg event at the Pan American Weightlifting Championships held in Santo Domingo, Dominican Republic. Cerro won two gold medals at the 2023 Central American and Caribbean Games held in San Salvador, El Salvador. He won the gold medal in the men's +109 kg Snatch event and also in the men's +109 kg Clean & Jerk event.

In 2024, he won the gold medal in the men's +109 kg event at the Pan American Weightlifting Championships held in Caracas, Venezuela.

== Achievements ==
Year	Venue	Weight	Snatch (kg)				Clean & Jerk (kg)				Total	Rank
Year	Venue	Weight	1	2	3	Rank	1	2	3	Rank	Total	Rank
Representing Colombia
World Championships
2021	Tashkent, Uzbekistan	109 kg	~~165~~	~~165~~	~~165~~	—N/a	202	210	~~216~~	4	—N/a	—N/a
2022	Bogotá, Colombia	109 kg	165	~~172~~	174	4	205	~~211~~	214	3rd place, bronze medalist(s)	388	3rd place, bronze medalist(s)
2024	Manama, Bahrain	+109 kg	~~180~~	~~180~~	180	9	210	~~220~~	~~236~~	14	390	9
Pan American Games
2023	Santiago, Chile	+102 kg	180	~~185~~	185	—N/a	220	~~225~~	225	—N/a	410	1st place, gold medalist(s)
Pan American Championships
2020	Santo Domingo, Dominican Republic	109 kg	165	~~170~~	170	1st place, gold medalist(s)	200	~~208~~	~~208~~	4	370	2nd place, silver medalist(s)
2021	Guayaquil, Ecuador	109 kg	165	172	—	1st place, gold medalist(s)	~~205~~	~~206~~	~~207~~	—N/a	—N/a	—N/a
2024	Caracas, Venezuela	+109 kg	~~170~~	170	177	1st place, gold medalist(s)	208	213	216	1st place, gold medalist(s)	393	1st place, gold medalist(s)
2025	Cali, Colombia	+110 kg	180	185	190	2nd place, silver medalist(s)	220	~~227~~	~~230~~	2nd place, silver medalist(s)	410	2nd place, silver medalist(s)
2026	Panama City, Panama	+110 kg	180	186	193	1st place, gold medalist(s)	220	226	~~235~~	1st place, gold medalist(s)	419 AM	1st place, gold medalist(s)
Central American and Caribbean Games
2023	San Salvador, El Salvador	+109 kg	170	172	180	1st place, gold medalist(s)	205	—	—	1st place, gold medalist(s)	—N/a	—N/a
Bolivarian Games
2025	Lima, Peru	+110 kg	180	188	~~194~~	1st place, gold medalist(s)	205	227 AM	~~240~~	1st place, gold medalist(s)	—N/a	—N/a
