= Abdelrahman Younes =

Egyptian weightlifter

Abdo Younes
Personal information
- Full name: Abdelrahman Mohamed Younes El-Sayed
- Nationality: Egyptian
- Born: 14 November 2004 (age 21)
- Weight: 85 kg (187 lb)

Sport
- Sport: Weightlifting
- Weight class: 88 kg (formerly 81, 79)

Achievements and titles
- Personal bests: Snatch: 182 kg (2026); Clean and jerk: 210kg (2026); Total: 392 kg (2026)
Medal record
Men's weightlifting
Representing Egypt
World Championships
Gold medal – first place	2026 Ningbo	–85 kg
Bronze medal – third place	2025 Førde	–79 kg
African Championships
Gold medal – first place	2026 Ismailia	–88 kg
Gold medal – first place	2025 Moka	–81 kg
Gold medal – first place	2024 Ismailia	–81 kg
Islamic Solidarity Games
Gold medal – first place	2025 Riyadh	79 kg
Mediterranean Games
Gold medal – first place	2026 Taranto	85 kg S
Gold medal – first place	2026 Taranto	85 kg CJ

Abdelrahman Younes (Arabic: عبد الرحمن يونس; * 14. November 2004), known as Abdo Younes, is an Egyptian Weightlifter. He is a multiple-times African Champion and world record holder in two categories.

== Career ==
Younes gave his debut on the international stage in 2024 at the African Weightlifting Championships in Ismailia. In the 81 kg category he won all three gold medals with 21 kg on second place in the total.

Also in 2024, he competed at the Junior World Weightlifting Championships in León where he placed second behind the Korean Kwon Dae Hee.

In 2025, he again won the African Championships. He snatched 162 kg and clean and jerked 183 kg for a total of 345 kg, earning him three golds.

In October 2025 in Førde, Younes made his first appearance at a Senior World Championships. Competing in the 79 kg category, he attempted a world record in the snatch at 167 kg twice, both of which where given a no lift. Yet, his made attempt at 162 kg in the snatch won him silver. Also his total of 360 kg earned him bronze.

In his third international competition of the year, the Islamic Solidarity Games in Riyadh, Younes snatched 166 kg, clean and jerked 196 kg and totalled 362 kg, winning him all three gold medals and world records in the snatch and total. Later that year, the record in the total was beaten by Rizki Juniansyah with 365 kg.

At the 2026 African Championships in Ismailia he won all golds. At this competition he set the world record in the snatch of the 88 kg category with 182 kg, beating Yeison López' in the process. A made lift of 210 kg in the clean and jerk brings his total up to 392 kg.
