= Yenny Sinisterra =

Colombian weightlifter (born 2000)

Personal information
- Born: 4 May 2000 (age 26)

Sport
- Country: Colombia
- Sport: Weightlifting
- Weight class: 53 kg; 55 kg; 63 kg; 64 kg
Medal record
Representing Colombia
Women's weightlifting
World Championships
Bronze medal – third place	2025 Førde	63 kg
Pan American Games
Silver medal – second place	2019 Lima	55 kg
Pan American Championships
Gold medal – first place	2025 Cali	63 kg
Silver medal – second place	2026 Panama City	63 kg
South American Games
Gold medal – first place	2018 Cochabamba	53 kg
Bolivarian Games
Gold medal – first place	2017 Santa Marta	53 kg S
Gold medal – first place	2017 Santa Marta	53 kg CJ
Gold medal – first place	2017 Santa Marta	53 kg
Gold medal – first place	2024 Ayacucho	64 kg
Gold medal – first place	2025 Lima-Ayacucho	63 kg S
Gold medal – first place	2025 Lima-Ayacucho	63 kg CJ
Junior World Championships
Silver medal – second place	2019 Suva	55 kg
Bronze medal – third place	2018 Tashkent	53 kg

Yenny Sinisterra (born 4 May 2000) is a Colombian weightlifter. She won the silver medal in the women's 55 kg event at the 2019 Pan American Games held in Lima, Peru. A month earlier, at the 2019 Junior World Weightlifting Championships held in Suva, Fiji, she won the silver medal in the women's 55 kg event.

In 2017, she won the gold medal in the women's 53 kg event at the Bolivarian Games held in Santa Marta, Colombia. In that same year, she also competed in the women's 53 kg event at the 2017 World Weightlifting Championships held in Anaheim, United States. The following year, she won the gold medal in the women's 53 kg event at the 2018 South American Games held in Cochabamba, Bolivia. She also competed in the women's 55 kg event at the 2018 World Weightlifting Championships held in Ashgabat, Turkmenistan.

In 2019, she competed in the women's 55 kg event at the World Weightlifting Championships held in Pattaya, Thailand. She finished in 5th place.

In February 2020, she was provisionally suspended after testing positive for the anabolic steroid boldenone. As of December 2020, her case is being contested at the Court of Arbitration for Sport as she may have ingested it after eating tainted meat and in Colombia boldenone is used for fattening cattle.

She won the gold medal in her event at the 2024 Bolivarian Games held in Ayacucho, Peru.
