= Ri Ryong-hyon =

North Korean weightlifter (born 2001)

Personal information
- Born: 25 January 2001 (age 25)

Sport
- Country: North Korea
- Sport: Weightlifting
- Weight class: 75 kg
Medal record
Men's weightlifting
Representing China
World Championships
Gold medal – first place	2024 Manama	73 kg
Gold medal – first place	2026 Ningbo	75 kg
Asian Championships
Gold medal – first place	2026 Gandhinagar	79 kg

Ri Ryong-hyon (born 25 January 2001) is a North Korean weightlifter. He is a two-time world champion.

== Career ==
In December 2024, he competed at the 2024 World Weightlifting Championships and won a gold medal in the 73 kg category. He opened the event with 152 kg in the snatch. He followed it up with 197 kg in the clean and jerk, before finishing with a total lift of 349 kg.

In May 2026, he competed at the 2026 Asian Weightlifting Championships and won a gold medal in the 79 kg category. He set a world record in the clean and jerk with a lift of 206 kg. In October 2026, he competed at the 2026 World Weightlifting Championships and won a gold medal in the 75 kg category. He opened the event with 160 kg in the snatch. He followed it up with 205 kg in the clean and jerk, before finishing with a total lift of 365 kg.
