= Dahiana Ortiz =

Dominican Republic weightlifter

Personal information
- Born: 27 November 2001 (age 24)

Sport
- Country: Dominican Republic
- Sport: Weightlifting
- Weight class: 48 kg; 49 kg
Medal record
Women's weightlifting
Representing Dominican Republic
Pan American Games
Gold medal – first place	2023 Santiago	49 kg
Pan American Championships
Gold medal – first place	2025 Cali	48 kg
Silver medal – second place	2021 Guayaquil	49 kg
Silver medal – second place	2026 Panama City	48 kg
Central American and Caribbean Games
Gold medal – first place	2023 San Salvador	49 kg CJ
Gold medal – first place	2026 Santo Domingo	48 kg CJ
Bronze medal – third place	2023 San Salvador	49 kg S
Junior Pan American Games
Gold medal – first place	2021 Cali-Valle	49 kg

Dahiana Ortiz (born 27 November 2001) is a Dominican Republic weightlifter. She won the gold medal in the women's 49 kg event at the 2023 Pan American Games held in Santiago, Chile. She won the silver medal in her event at the 2021 Pan American Weightlifting Championships held in Guayaquil, Ecuador.

Ortiz won two medals, including gold, at the 2023 Central American and Caribbean Games held in San Salvador, El Salvador. She won the gold medal in the women's 49 kg Clean & Jerk event and the bronze medal in the women's 49 kg Snatch event.

Ortiz represented the Dominican Republic at the 2018 Summer Youth Olympics held in Buenos Aires, Argentina. She finished in fourth place in the girls' 48 kg event. She won the 48 kg category gold medal in clean and jerk at the 2026 Central American and Caribbean Games.

== Achievements ==
Year	Venue	Weight	Snatch (kg)				Clean & Jerk (kg)				Total	Rank
Year	Venue	Weight	1	2	3	Rank	1	2	3	Rank	Total	Rank
World Championships
2022	Bogotá, Colombia	49 kg	78	82	~~85~~	11	~~103~~	~~103~~	~~103~~	—	—	—
2023	Riyadh, Saudi Arabia	49 kg	~~79~~	79	~~82~~	14	100	~~105~~	~~105~~	14	179	14
2025	Førde, Norway	48 kg	~~79~~	~~79~~	~~79~~	—	100	~~105~~	~~105~~	9	—	—
Pan American Games
2023	Santiago, Chile	49 kg	79	~~83~~	83	—N/a	101	104	107	—N/a	190	1st place, gold medalist(s)
