= 2026 World Weightlifting Championships – Men's 85 kg =

Men's 85 kg at the 2026 World Weightlifting Championships
- Venue: Ningbo Olympic Sports Center
- Location: Ningbo, China
- Dates: 2 November
- Competitors: 41 from 37 nations
- Winning total: 390 kg WR

Medalists
gold medal	Abdelrahman Younes	Egypt
silver medal	Yeison López	Colombia
bronze medal	Lei Jiangqing	China

The men's 85 kilograms competition at the 2026 World Weightlifting Championships was held on 2 November 2026.

== Schedule ==
Date	Time	Event
2 November 2026	11:00	Group D
2 November 2026	13:30	Group C
2 November 2026	16:00	Group B
2 November 2026	19:00	Group A

== Records ==
Prior to this competition, the existing world records were as follows.

World record	Snatch	Alexey Churkin (KAZ)	173 kg	Nagoya, Japan	28 September 2026
World record	Clean & Jerk	Ro Kwang-ryol (PRK)	214 kg	Nagoya, Japan	28 September 2026
World record	Total	Ro Kwang-ryol (PRK)	379 kg	Nagoya, Japan	28 September 2026

== Results ==
Rank	Athlete	Group	Snatch (kg)				Clean & Jerk (kg)				Total
Rank	Athlete	Group	1	2	3	Rank	1	2	3	Rank	Total
1st place, gold medalist(s)	Abdelrahman Younes (EGY)	A	174	~~177~~	177	2nd place, silver medalist(s)	204	208	213	3rd place, bronze medalist(s)	390; WR
2nd place, silver medalist(s)	Yeison López (COL)	A	~~175~~	175	178; WR	1st place, gold medalist(s)	205	209	~~213~~	5	387
3rd place, bronze medalist(s)	Lei Jiangqing (CHN)	A	163	168	~~173~~	8	203	211	214	2nd place, silver medalist(s)	382
4	Alexey Churkin (KAZ)	A	168	~~172~~	~~172~~	7	205	210	~~214~~	4	378
5	Ro Kwang-ryol (PRK)	A	~~161~~	163	~~167~~	11	209	215; WR	~~220~~	1st place, gold medalist(s)	378
6	Chen Shunnan (CHN)	A	160	165	169	6	~~205~~	205	~~213~~	6	374
7	Marin Robu (MDA)	A	168	174	176	3rd place, bronze medalist(s)	~~197~~	197	~~203~~	15	373
8	Sarvarbek Zafarjonov (UZB)	A	162	166	~~169~~	9	198	~~206~~	~~206~~	13	364
9	Abdollah Beiranvand (IRI)	A	164	~~169~~	170	5	193	~~199~~	~~200~~	18	363
10	Zurab Mskhaladze (GEO)	B	~~157~~	157	161	13	191	196	201	8	362
11	Ángel Rodríguez (VEN)	B	163	167	170; WJR	4	~~191~~	191	~~198~~	20	361
12	Ravin Almammadov (AZE)	B	152	158	162	12	193	198	~~202~~	11	360
13	Mirmostafa Javadi (IRI)	A	155	160	~~164~~	15	200	~~203~~	~~204~~	10	360
14	Gaýgysyz Töräýew (TKM)	B	152	~~156~~	157	16	193	201	~~206~~	7	358
15	Kim Sung-min (KOR)	B	150	155	~~158~~	19	~~189~~	195	200	9	355
16	Yedige Yemberdi (KAZ)	A	~~154~~	154	157	17	~~198~~	198	~~202~~	14	355
17	Rakuei Azuma (JPN)	B	153	~~157~~	~~157~~	20	193	198	~~204~~	17	348
18	Caden Cahoy (USA)	B	150	~~154~~	~~155~~	24	193	198	~~204~~	12	348
19	Gevorg Serobian (RUS)	C	155	160	163	10	175	180	184	26	347
20	Lucas Müller (GER)	B	151	~~156~~	~~156~~	21	191	196	~~202~~	16	347
21	Andranik Karapetyan (BIH)	B	160	~~163~~	~~166~~	14	186	~~190~~	~~190~~	24	346
22	Rafik Harutyunyan (ARM)	B	155	~~160~~	~~160~~	18	190	~~198~~	~~198~~	22	345
23	Martin Poghosyan (ARM)	C	~~147~~	147	~~152~~	27	~~184~~	185	190	21	337
24	Hsieh Meng-en (TPE)	B	~~148~~	148	~~152~~	25	~~188~~	~~188~~	188	23	336
25	Muhammad Erry Hidayat (MAS)	C	145	150	~~155~~	22	180	185	~~190~~	25	335
26	Neiser Grefa (ECU)	C	144	~~148~~	~~148~~	30	182	~~187~~	191	19	335
27	Natthawut Suepsuan (THA)	C	145	~~150~~	150	23	170	175	181	28	331
28	Javier González (ESP)	C	142	147	~~150~~	26	175	183	~~186~~	27	330
29	Irmantas Kačinskas (LTU)	C	140	144	147	28	170	174	~~176~~	30	321
30	Cameron McTaggart (NZL)	C	145	~~148~~	~~148~~	29	~~175~~	175	—	29	320
31	Petr Mareček (CZE)	C	140	143	~~146~~	31	169	172	~~176~~	32	315
32	Ritvars Suharevs (LAT)	D	120	130	135	34	160	167	173	31	308
33	Loh Yuan Yee (SGP)	D	~~131~~	135	~~143~~	33	~~167~~	171	~~180~~	33	306
34	Shad Darsigny (CAN)	C	~~137~~	137	~~142~~	32	~~169~~	169	~~173~~	34	306
35	Uaealesi Funaki (TGA)	D	~~132~~	~~132~~	134	36	~~160~~	160	~~170~~	36	294
36	Bergur Sverrisson (ISL)	D	130	~~135~~	135	35	~~153~~	153	158	37	293
37	Issa Al-Balushi (UAE)	D	~~130~~	130	~~135~~	37	160	—	—	35	290
38	Md Rahim (BAN)	D	~~120~~	~~120~~	120	39	~~150~~	150	~~156~~	38	270
39	Daniel Shaw (FIJ)	D	115	~~120~~	120	38	145	~~150~~	150	39	270
40	Franklin Atete (KEN)	D	~~113~~	113	~~120~~	40	138	142	~~150~~	40	255
41	Khallaf Al-Otaibi (KUW)	D	~~85~~	85	90	41	100	110	~~115~~	41	200
—	Brayan Ibanez (KOS)	C	Did not start								
—	Falah Al-Thafiri (KUW)	D	Did not start								
—	Kristi Ramadani (ALB)	D	Did not start								
