= Pak Pyol =

North Korean weightlifter (born 2003)

Personal information
- Born: 3 September 2003 (age 23) North Korea
- Weight: 70 kg (154 lb)

Sport
- Country: North Korea
- Sport: Weightlifting
Medal record
Men's weightlifting
Representing North Korea
World Championships
Gold medal – first place	2026 Ningbo	70 kg
Silver medal – second place	2024 Manama	67 kg

Korean name
- Hangul: 박별
- RR: Bak Byeol
- MR: Pak Pyŏl

Pak Pyol (Korean: 박별; born 3 September 2003) is a North Korean weightlifter. At the 2026 World Weightlifting Championships, he set a world record in the snatch.
