= Natasha Rosa Figueiredo =

Brazilian weightlifter (born 1996)

Personal information
- Full name: Natasha Rosa Figueiredo
- Born: 16 February 1996 (age 30) Rio de Janeiro, Brazil
- Years active: 2012–present
- Height: 150 cm (4 ft 11 in)
- Weight: 49 kg (108 lb)

Sport
- Country: Brazil
- Sport: Weightlifting
- Club: (Brazil) Associação do Pessoal da Caixa Econômica Federal - APCEF RJ
- Team: National team
Medal record
Women's weightlifting
Representing Brazil
Pan American Championships
Silver medal – second place	2026 Panama City	53 kg
Bronze medal – third place	2022 Bogotá	49 kg
Bronze medal – third place	2025 Cali	53 kg
South American Games
Silver medal – second place	2022 Asunción	49 kg
Bronze medal – third place	2026 Santa Fe	53 kg

Natasha Rosa Figueiredo (born February 16, 1996) is a Brazilian professional weightlifter who earned a spot at the 2020 Summer Olympics in the 49kg category. She finished in 9th place in the women's 49 kg event. She won the bronze medal in her event at the 2022 Pan American Weightlifting Championships held in Bogotá, Colombia.

== Career ==
Figueiredo competed in the 2020 Summer Olympics in the 49kg competition. She nearly did not make it due to minor doping violations, but was eventually cleared to compete after her case went to arbitration.

She won the silver medal in her event at the 2022 South American Games held in Asunción, Paraguay. she competed in the women's 49 kg event at the 2022 World Weightlifting Championships held in Bogotá, Colombia.

== Achievements ==
Year	Venue	Weight	Snatch (kg)				Clean & Jerk (kg)				Total	Rank
Year	Venue	Weight	1	2	3	Rank	1	2	3	Rank	Total	Rank
World Championships
2022	Bogotá, Colombia	49 kg	83	~~86~~	~~86~~	9	104	~~107~~	~~108~~	6	187	8
2025	Førde, Norway	53 kg	~~84~~	84	~~88~~	6	108	~~112~~	~~112~~	5	192	5
Pan American Championships
2022	Bogotá, Colombia	49 kg	80	84	~~86~~	2nd place, silver medalist(s)	101	104	106	3rd place, bronze medalist(s)	190	3rd place, bronze medalist(s)
2025	Cali, Colombia	53 kg	84	87	~~89~~	3rd place, bronze medalist(s)	106	109	111	2nd place, silver medalist(s)	198	3rd place, bronze medalist(s)
South American Games
2022	Asunción, Paraguay	49 kg	82	84	—	—N/a	~~100~~	~~102~~	102	—N/a	186	2nd place, silver medalist(s)
