= Ro Kwang-ryol =

North Korean weightlifter (born 2001)

Personal information
- Born: 30 April 2001 (age 25) North Korea
- Weight: 88 kg (194 lb)

Sport
- Country: North Korea
- Sport: Weightlifting

Achievements and titles
- Personal bests: Snatch: 170 kg (2022); Clean & Jerk: 218 kg (2024); Total: 386 kg (2022)
Medal record
Men's weightlifting
Representing North Korea
World Championships
Silver medal – second place	2024 Manama	89 kg
Silver medal – second place	2025 Førde	88 kg
Asian Games
Gold medal – first place	2026 Aichi–Nagoya	85 kg
Silver medal – second place	2022 Hangzhou	96 kg
Asian Championships
Gold medal – first place	2025 Jiangshan	89 kg
Gold medal – first place	2026 Gandhinagar	88 kg

Korean name
- Hangul: 노광렬
- RR: No Gwangryeol
- MR: No Kwangnyŏl

Ro Kwang-ryol (Korean: 노광렬; born 30 April 2001) is a North Korean weightlifter competing in the men's 88 kg category. He won the silver medal in the men's 89 kg event at the 2024 World Weightlifting Championships held in Manama, Bahrain, and a silver medal at the 2022 Asian Games held in Hangzhou, China.

== Achievements ==
Year	Venue	Weight	Snatch (kg)				Clean & Jerk (kg)				Total	Rank
Year	Venue	Weight	1	2	3	Rank	1	2	3	Rank	Total	Rank
World Championships
2024	Manama, Bahrain	89 kg	~~162~~	162	~~167~~	9	210	216	218	2nd place, silver medalist(s)	380	2nd place, silver medalist(s)
2025	Førde, Norway	88 kg	162	~~168~~	~~168~~	5	208	211	215 CWR	2nd place, silver medalist(s)	377	2nd place, silver medalist(s)
Asian Games
2022	Hangzhou, China	96 kg	165	170	~~173~~	—N/a	211	216	~~221~~	—N/a	386	2nd place, silver medalist(s)
Asian Championships
2025	Jiangshan, China	89 kg	160	165	168	2nd place, silver medalist(s)	210	212	~~219~~	1st place, gold medalist(s)	370	1st place, gold medalist(s)
2026	Ghandinagar, India	88 kg	162	167	~~170~~	2nd place, silver medalist(s)	207	217	220; WR	1st place, gold medalist(s)	387	1st place, gold medalist(s)
