= 2026 World Weightlifting Championships – Men's 70 kg =

Men's 70 kg at the 2026 World Weightlifting Championships
- Venue: Ningbo Olympic Sports Center
- Location: Ningbo, China
- Dates: 30 October
- Competitors: 11 from 10 nations
- Winning total: 355 kg WR

Medalists
gold medal	Pak Pyol	North Korea
silver medal	Ri Won-ju	North Korea
bronze medal	He Baozhen	China

The men's 70 kilograms competition at the 2026 World Weightlifting Championships was held on 30 October 2026.

== Schedule ==
Date	Time	Event
30 October 2026	19:00	Group A

== Records ==
Prior to this competition, the existing world records were as follows.

World record	Snatch	Masanori Miyamoto (JPN)	154 kg	Nagoya, Japan	26 September 2026
World record	Clean & Jerk	Ri Won-ju (PRK)	198 kg	Nagoya, Japan	26 September 2026
World record	Total	Ri Won-ju (PRK)	349 kg	Nagoya, Japan	26 September 2026

== Results ==
Rank	Athlete	Group	Snatch (kg)				Clean & Jerk (kg)				Total
Rank	Athlete	Group	1	2	3	Rank	1	2	3	Rank	Total
1st place, gold medalist(s)	Pak Pyol (PRK)	A	150	155	157; WR	1st place, gold medalist(s)	190	195	198	1st place, gold medalist(s)	355; WR
2nd place, silver medalist(s)	Ri Won-ju (PRK)	A	147	~~151~~	151	3rd place, bronze medalist(s)	192	~~205~~	—	2nd place, silver medalist(s)	343
3rd place, bronze medalist(s)	He Baozhen (CHN)	A	143	148	151	2nd place, silver medalist(s)	182	188	~~193~~	3rd place, bronze medalist(s)	339
4	Albert Delos Santos (PHI)	A	140	~~143~~	144	4	181	~~187~~	187; WJR	4	331; WJR
5	Engin Kara (TUR)	A	~~135~~	~~135~~	135	5	161	~~165~~	~~165~~	7	296
6	Ivan Novko (CRO)	A	112	~~117~~	~~120~~	6	140	~~150~~	150	8	262
7	Roy Joydev Candra (BAN)	A	105	~~111~~	111	7	~~133~~	133	141	9	252
—	Artsem Danilchyk (BLR)	A	~~138~~	~~138~~	~~138~~	—	~~168~~	~~168~~	168	5	—
—	Isa Rustamov (AZE)	A	~~143~~	~~143~~	~~144~~	—	165	~~175~~	~~175~~	6	—
—	Jorge Cárdenas (MEX)	A	~~145~~	~~145~~	~~149~~	—	—	—	—	—	—
—	Lee Sang-yeon (KOR)	A	—	—	—	—	—	—	—	—	—
