= Weightlifting at the 2015 Pan American Games – Women's 48 kg =

Weightlifting – Women's 48 kg at the 2015 Pan American Games
- Venue: Oshawa Sports Centre
- Dates: July 11
- Competitors: 9 from 8 nations

Medalists
Gold medal	Cándida Vásquez	Dominican Republic
Silver medal	Ana Segura	Colombia
Bronze medal	Beatriz Pirón	Dominican Republic

The women's 48 kg competition of the weightlifting events at the 2015 Pan American Games in Toronto, Canada, was held on July 11 at the Oshawa Sports Centre. The defending champion was Lely Burgos from Puerto Rico.

Each lifter performed in both the snatch and clean and jerk lifts, with the final score being the sum of the lifter's best result in each. The athlete received three attempts in each of the two lifts; the score for the lift was the heaviest weight successfully lifted. This weightlifting event was the lightest men's event at the weightlifting competition, limiting competitors to a maximum of 56 kilograms of body mass.

== Schedule ==
All times are Eastern Daylight Time (UTC-4).

Date	Time	Round
July 11, 2015	16:30	Final

== Results ==
9 athletes from eight countries took part.

- PR – Pan American Games record

Rank	Name	Country	Group	B.weight (kg)	Snatch (kg)	Clean & Jerk (kg)	Total (kg)
1st place, gold medalist(s)	Cándida Vásquez	Dominican Republic	A	47.90	81 PR	100	181 PR
2nd place, silver medalist(s)	Ana Segura	Colombia	A	47.43	77	103 PR	180
3rd place, bronze medalist(s)	Beatriz Pirón	Dominican Republic	A	47.90	80	95	175
4	Morghan King	United States	A	47.51	79	93	172
5	Betsi Rivas	Venezuela	A	47.63	70	92	162
6	Lely Burgos	Puerto Rico	A	47.66	71	91	162
7	Jennifer Lopez	Ecuador	A	47.08	70	91	161
8	Genesis Murcia	El Salvador	A	47.95	70	88	158
9	Amanda Braddock	Canada	A	47.86	70	85	155

== New records ==
The following records were established and improved upon during the competition.

Snatch	81.0 kg	Cándida Vásquez (DOM)	PR
Clean & Jerk	103.0 kg	Ana Segura (COL)	PR
Total	181.0 kg	Cándida Vásquez (DOM)	PR
