= 2026 Pan American Weightlifting Championships =

Weightlifting competition in Panama City, Panama

- Venue: High Performance Center (CAR)
- Location: Panama City, Panama
- Dates: 27–30 April
- Organizing body: Pan American Weightlifting Federation
- Competitors: 168 from 23 nations

The 2026 Pan American Weightlifting Championships were held in Panama City, Panama from 27 to 30 April 2026.

== Background ==
The competition will also serve as the qualification event for XXIII Commonwealth Games in Glasgow in 2026.

== Medal table ==
Ranking by Big (Total result) medals

| Rank | Nation | Gold | Silver | Bronze | Total |
|---|---|---|---|---|---|
| 1 | United States | 6 | 4 | 3 | 13 |
| 2 | Colombia | 4 | 5 | 3 | 12 |
| 3 | Ecuador | 2 | 1 | 1 | 4 |
| 4 | Venezuela | 2 | 0 | 3 | 5 |
| 5 | Brazil | 1 | 1 | 2 | 4 |
| 6 | Argentina | 1 | 0 | 0 | 1 |
| 7 | Cuba | 0 | 2 | 0 | 2 |
| 8 | Canada | 0 | 1 | 1 | 2 |
| 8 | Chile | 0 | 1 | 1 | 2 |
| 8 | Dominican Republic | 0 | 1 | 1 | 2 |
| 11 | Mexico | 0 | 0 | 1 | 1 |
| Totals (11 entries) | | 16 | 16 | 16 | 48 |

Ranking by all medals: Big (Total result) and Small (Snatch and Clean & Jerk)

| Rank | Nation | Gold | Silver | Bronze | Total |
|---|---|---|---|---|---|
| 1 | Colombia | 16 | 10 | 12 | 38 |
| 2 | United States | 14 | 13 | 8 | 35 |
| 3 | Venezuela | 6 | 3 | 6 | 15 |
| 4 | Ecuador | 5 | 5 | 3 | 13 |
| 5 | Brazil | 3 | 2 | 6 | 11 |
| 6 | Argentina | 2 | 1 | 0 | 3 |
| 7 | Cuba | 1 | 4 | 1 | 6 |
| 8 | Canada | 1 | 2 | 1 | 4 |
| 9 | Dominican Republic | 0 | 3 | 3 | 6 |
| 10 | Chile | 0 | 2 | 3 | 5 |
| 11 | Mexico | 0 | 1 | 2 | 3 |
| 12 | Guatemala | 0 | 1 | 0 | 1 |
| 12 | Nicaragua | 0 | 1 | 0 | 1 |
| 14 | Peru | 0 | 0 | 2 | 2 |
| 15 | Puerto Rico | 0 | 0 | 1 | 1 |
| Totals (15 entries) | | 48 | 48 | 48 | 144 |

== Medal overview ==
=== Men ===
| Event | | Gold | | Silver | | Bronze | |
| – 60 kg | Snatch | Gabriel Chhum (USA) | 126 kg | Otto Oñate (CUB) | 122 kg | Jefferson Gómez (VEN) | 119 kg |
| – 60 kg | Clean & Jerk | Gabriel Chhum (USA) | 155 kg | Otto Oñate (CUB) | 155 kg | Jhon Serna (COL) | 151 kg |
| – 60 kg | Total | Gabriel Chhum (USA) | 281 kg | Otto Oñate (CUB) | 277 kg | Jhon Serna (COL) | 269 kg |
| – 65 kg | Snatch | Francisco Mosquera (COL) | 139 kg | Hampton Morris (USA) | 138 kg | Luis Bardalez (PER) | 133 kg |
| – 65 kg | Clean & Jerk | Francisco Mosquera (COL) | 181 kg | Hampton Morris (USA) | 177 kg | Thiago Silva (BRA) | 170 kg |
| – 65 kg | Total | Francisco Mosquera (COL) | 320 kg AM | Hampton Morris (USA) | 315 kg | Thiago Silva (BRA) | 302 kg |
| – 71 kg | Snatch | Luis Javier Mosquera (COL) | 145 kg | Sergio Cares (CHI) | 130 kg | Erick Estupiñán (ECU) | 129 kg |
| – 71 kg | Clean & Jerk | Luis Javier Mosquera (COL) | 170 kg | Wilfredo Camey (GUA) | 164 kg | Sergio Cares (CHI) | 163 kg |
| – 71 kg | Total | Luis Javier Mosquera (COL) | 315 kg | Sergio Cares (CHI) | 293 kg | Erick Estupiñán (ECU) | 291 kg |
| – 79 kg | Snatch | Hugo Montes (COL) | 155 kg | Caden Cahoy (USA) | 150 kg | Juan Martínez (COL) | 147 kg |
| – 79 kg | Clean & Jerk | Caden Cahoy (USA) | 204 kg AM | Julio Mayora (VEN) | 191 kg | Hugo Montes (COL) | 190 kg |
| – 79 kg | Total | Caden Cahoy (USA) | 354 kg | Hugo Montes (COL) | 345 kg | Julio Mayora (VEN) | 336 kg |
| – 88 kg | Snatch | Yeison López (COL) | 181 kg WR | Norwin Washington (NCA) | 160 kg | Hutton Boles (USA) | 159 kg |
| – 88 kg | Clean & Jerk | Yeison López (COL) | 216 kg WR | Neiser Grefa (ECU) | 195 kg | Brandon Victorian (USA) | 195 kg |
| – 88 kg | Total | Yeison López (COL) | 397 kg WR | Hutton Boles (USA) | 349 kg | Brandon Victorian (USA) | 349 kg |
| – 94 kg | Snatch | Keydomar Vallenilla (VEN) | 177 kg AM | David Guadamud (ECU) | 165 kg | Óscar Garcés (COL) | 160 kg |
| – 94 kg | Clean & Jerk | Keydomar Vallenilla (VEN) | 212 kg | David Guadamud (ECU) | 200 kg | Óscar Garcés (COL) | 200 kg |
| – 94 kg | Total | Keydomar Vallenilla (VEN) | 389 kg | David Guadamud (ECU) | 365 kg | Óscar Garcés (COL) | 360 kg |
| – 110 kg | Snatch | Matheus Pessanha (BRA) | 180 kg | Kolbi Ferguson (USA) | 173 kg | Alejandro Medina (PUR) | 170 kg |
| – 110 kg | Clean & Jerk | Matheus Pessanha (BRA) | 228 kg AM | Kolbi Ferguson (USA) | 224 kg | Hernán Viera (PER) | 207 kg |
| – 110 kg | Total | Matheus Pessanha (BRA) | 408 kg AM | Kolbi Ferguson (USA) | 397 kg | Xavier Lusignan (CAN) | 368 kg |
| + 110 kg | Snatch | Rafael Cerro (COL) | 193 kg | Aaron Williams (USA) | 185 kg | Dixon Arroyo (ECU) | 172 kg |
| + 110 kg | Clean & Jerk | Rafael Cerro (COL) | 226 kg | Aaron Williams (USA) | 225 kg | Alonso Bizama (CHI) | 210 kg |
| + 110 kg | Total | Rafael Cerro (COL) | 419 kg AM | Aaron Williams (USA) | 410 kg | Alonso Bizama (CHI) | 376 kg |

=== Women ===
| Event | | Gold | | Silver | | Bronze | |
| – 48 kg | Snatch | Patricia Mercado (VEN) | 83 kg | Dahiana Ortiz (DOM) | 80 kg | Mariangeli Martínez (VEN) | 75 kg |
| – 48 kg | Clean & Jerk | Mariangeli Martínez (VEN) | 101 kg | Dahiana Ortiz (DOM) | 100 kg | Patricia Mercado (VEN) | 98 kg |
| – 48 kg | Total | Patricia Mercado (VEN) | 181 kg | Dahiana Ortiz (DOM) | 180 kg | Mariangeli Martínez (VEN) | 176 kg |
| – 53 kg | Snatch | Miranda Ulrey (USA) | 96 kg AM | Rohelys Galvis (COL) | 87 kg | Natasha Rosa Figueiredo (BRA) | 87 kg |
| – 53 kg | Clean & Jerk | Miranda Ulrey (USA) | 120 kg AM | Katherin Echandía (VEN) | 109 kg | Natasha Rosa Figueiredo (BRA) | 108 kg |
| – 53 kg | Total | Miranda Ulrey (USA) | 216 kg AM | Natasha Rosa Figueiredo (BRA) | 195 kg | Katherin Echandía (VEN) | 192 kg |
| – 58 kg | Snatch | Ann-Sophie Taschereau (CAN) | 94 kg | María Luz Casadevall (ARG) | 93 kg | Sohaila Cortés (MEX) | 91 kg |
| – 58 kg | Clean & Jerk | María Luz Casadevall (ARG) | 121 kg | Ann-Sophie Taschereau (CAN) | 119 kg | Antonina Moya (COL) | 114 kg |
| – 58 kg | Total | María Luz Casadevall (ARG) | 214 kg | Ann-Sophie Taschereau (CAN) | 213 kg | Sohaila Cortés (MEX) | 204 kg |
| – 63 kg | Snatch | Karen Mosquera (COL) | 108 kg | Sophia Shaft (USA) | 107 kg | Yenny Sinisterra (COL) | 104 kg |
| – 63 kg | Clean & Jerk | Yenny Sinisterra (COL) | 130 kg | Sophia Shaft (USA) | 130 kg | Karen Mosquera (COL) | 123 kg |
| – 63 kg | Total | Sophia Shaft (USA) | 237 kg | Yenny Sinisterra (COL) | 234 kg | Karen Mosquera (COL) | 231 kg |
| – 69 kg | Snatch | Olivia Reeves (USA) | 115 kg | Julieth Rodríguez (COL) | 111 kg | Fransheska Matías (DOM) | 110 kg |
| – 69 kg | Clean & Jerk | Olivia Reeves (USA) | 147 kg | Julieth Rodríguez (COL) | 136 kg | Fransheska Matías (DOM) | 135 kg |
| – 69 kg | Total | Olivia Reeves (USA) | 262 kg | Julieth Rodríguez (COL) | 247 kg | Fransheska Matías (DOM) | 245 kg |
| – 77 kg | Snatch | María Mena (COL) | 116 kg | Laura Amaro (BRA) | 111 kg | Mattie Rogers (USA) | 108 kg |
| – 77 kg | Clean & Jerk | Mattie Rogers (USA) | 141 kg | Mari Sánchez (COL) | 138 kg | Laura Amaro (BRA) | 137 kg |
| – 77 kg | Total | Mattie Rogers (USA) | 249 kg | María Mena (COL) | 248 kg | Laura Amaro (BRA) | 248 kg |
| – 86 kg | Snatch | Kelin Jiménez (ECU) | 109 kg | Lizbeth Nolasco (MEX) | 108 kg | Valeria Rivas (COL) | 107 kg |
| – 86 kg | Clean & Jerk | Kelin Jiménez (ECU) | 137 kg | Valeria Rivas (COL) | 133 kg | Katelyn Witte (USA) | 133 kg |
| – 86 kg | Total | Kelin Jiménez (ECU) | 246 kg | Valeria Rivas (COL) | 240 kg | Katelyn Witte (USA) | 239 kg |
| + 86 kg | Snatch | Lisseth Ayoví (ECU) | 121 kg | Naryury Pérez (VEN) | 120 kg | Marifélix Sarría (CUB) | 119 kg |
| + 86 kg | Clean & Jerk | Marifélix Sarría (CUB) | 161 kg | Lisseth Ayoví (ECU) | 160 kg | Mary Theisen-Lappen (USA) | 159 kg |
| + 86 kg | Total | Lisseth Ayoví (ECU) | 281 kg AM | Marifélix Sarría (CUB) | 280 kg | Mary Theisen-Lappen (USA) | 271 kg |

== Team ranking ==
Men

| Rank | Team | Points |
|---|---|---|
| 1 | Colombia | 615 |
| 2 | United States | 593 |
| 3 | Venezuela | 471 |
| 4 | Ecuador | 385 |
| 5 | Puerto Rico | 315 |
| 6 | Guatemala | 309 |

Women

| Rank | Team | Points |
|---|---|---|
| 1 | Colombia | 577 |
| 2 | United States | 539 |
| 3 | Canada | 481 |
| 4 | Venezuela | 440 |
| 5 | Mexico | 366 |
| 6 | Canada | 343 |
