= 2026 World Weightlifting Championships – Men's 75 kg =

Men's 75 kg at the 2026 World Weightlifting Championships
- Venue: Ningbo Olympic Sports Center
- Location: Ningbo, China
- Dates: 30–31 October
- Competitors: 36 from 30 nations
- Winning total: 365 kg

Medalists
gold medal	Ri Ryong-hyon	North Korea
silver medal	Rahmat Erwin Abdullah	Indonesia
bronze medal	Weeraphon Wichuma	Thailand

The men's 75 kilograms competition at the 2026 World Weightlifting Championships was held on 30 and 31 October 2026.

== Schedule ==
Date	Time	Event
30 October 2026	13:30	Group D
31 October 2026	13:30	Group C
31 October 2026	16:00	Group B
31 October 2026	19:00	Group A

== Records ==
Prior to this competition, the existing world records were as follows.

World record	Snatch	Ri Chong-song (PRK)	162 kg	Nagoya, Japan	26 September 2026
World record	Clean & Jerk	Rahmat Erwin Abdullah (INA)	206 kg	Nagoya, Japan	26 September 2026
World record	Total	Rahmat Erwin Abdullah (INA)	366 kg	Nagoya, Japan	26 September 2026

== Results ==
Rank	Athlete	Group	Snatch (kg)				Clean & Jerk (kg)				Total
Rank	Athlete	Group	1	2	3	Rank	1	2	3	Rank	Total
1st place, gold medalist(s)	Ri Ryong-hyon (PRK)	A	155	160	~~162~~	1st place, gold medalist(s)	198	~~203~~	205	1st place, gold medalist(s)	365
2nd place, silver medalist(s)	Rahmat Erwin Abdullah (INA)	A	153	157	—	5	195	202	~~207~~	2nd place, silver medalist(s)	359
3rd place, bronze medalist(s)	Weeraphon Wichuma (THA)	A	155	~~159~~	~~159~~	7	197	200	—	3rd place, bronze medalist(s)	355
4	Hugo Montes (COL)	B	153	~~158~~	158	3rd place, bronze medalist(s)	183	188	~~193~~	6	346
5	Masanori Miyamoto (JPN)	B	148	153	~~158~~	8	185	190	~~194~~	4	343
6	Son Hyeon-ho (KOR)	A	145	~~151~~	151	10	190	~~199~~	~~199~~	5	341
7	Didarbek Jumabaýew (TKM)	A	145	150	152; WJR	9	185	188; WJR	~~192~~	7	340; WJR
8	Yahor Papou (BLR)	A	146	~~151~~	151	11	180	186	~~188~~	9	337
9	Zulfat Garaev (RUS)	C	149	153	155	6	172	177	181	12	336
10	Bektimur Reýimow (TKM)	C	150	154	157	4	~~176~~	178	~~183~~	18	335
11	Ryan Grimsland (USA)	B	145	149	~~152~~	18	185	~~189~~	~~190~~	10	334
12	Kaan Kahriman (TUR)	A	~~155~~	155	159	2nd place, silver medalist(s)	175	~~180~~	~~182~~	23	334
13	Edward Ginnan (USA)	B	~~145~~	145	~~149~~	25	180	187	~~193~~	8	332
14	Petr Khrebtov (KAZ)	C	140	144	147	20	~~180~~	180	184	11	331
15	Reinner Arango (VEN)	C	~~150~~	~~150~~	150	13	180	~~187~~	~~190~~	13	330
16	Chiang Tsung-han (TPE)	C	145	150	~~153~~	12	173	180	~~183~~	14	330
17	Tiberiu Donose (ROU)	A	150	~~155~~	~~156~~	16	177	~~182~~	~~182~~	19	327
18	Jair Reyes (ECU)	C	~~142~~	142	148	19	178	~~183~~	—	17	326
19	Roberto Gutu (GER)	B	146	150	~~153~~	14	176	~~181~~	~~181~~	20	326
20	Ahmed Nasar (EGY)	B	145	~~149~~	~~149~~	24	180	~~187~~	~~188~~	15	325
21	Konrad Łazuga (POL)	C	145	~~149~~	149	17	~~175~~	175	~~181~~	22	324
22	Sergei Petrov (RUS)	D	140	145	~~150~~	22	170	175	~~180~~	21	320
23	Tojonirina Andriantsitohaina (MAD)	D	140	145	~~150~~	23	170	~~176~~	~~176~~	24	315
24	Christopher Murray (GBR)	D	142	~~146~~	~~150~~	26	~~170~~	170	~~176~~	25	312
25	Ezekiel Moses (NRU)	D	135	140	~~145~~	27	165	~~170~~	170	26	310
26	Sergio Cares (CHI)	D	~~128~~	130	~~136~~	28	160	~~166~~	166	27	296
27	Harrison McGrogan (IRL)	D	~~128~~	~~128~~	128	29	163	~~170~~	~~171~~	28	291
28	Nikola Todorović (CRO)	D	120	127	~~130~~	30	~~155~~	155	~~160~~	29	282
—	Gor Sahakyan (ARM)	A	—	—	—	—	—	—	—	—	—
—	Yusuf Fehmi Genç (TUR)	A	150	~~154~~	~~155~~	15	~~183~~	~~186~~	~~186~~	—	—
—	Julio Mayora (VEN)	B	~~150~~	~~150~~	~~150~~	—	—	—	—	—	—
—	Erkand Qerimaj (ALB)	B	~~147~~	~~147~~	~~147~~	—	—	—	—	—	—
—	Tigran Karapetyan (ARM)	C	~~145~~	~~145~~	~~147~~	—	175	179	~~183~~	16	—
—	Mostafa Waheed (UAE)	C	~~140~~	~~140~~	~~140~~	—	—	—	—	—	—
—	Julio Cedeño (DOM)	D	143	146	~~150~~	21	~~175~~	~~175~~	~~175~~	—	—
—	Hamad Al-Jarllah (KUW)	D	90	~~95~~	~~95~~	31	~~120~~	~~120~~	~~120~~	—	—
—	Briken Calja (ALB)	C	Did not start								
—	Ishmail Kamara (SLE)	D	Did not start								
