= 2025 Pan American Weightlifting Championships =

- Venue: Coliseo Miguel Calero
- Location: Cali, Colombia
- Dates: 13–18 July

The 2025 Pan American Weightlifting Championships was held in Cali, Colombia from 13 to 18 July 2025.

== Medal summary ==
=== Men ===
Event	Gold		Silver		Bronze	
60 kg
Snatch	Gabriel Chhum; United States	123 kg	Thiago Silva; Brazil	120 kg	Angello Solórzano; Venezuela	111 kg
Clean & Jerk	Thiago Silva; Brazil	158 kg	Gabriel Chhum; United States	152 kg	Henry Esquivel; Guatemala	141kg
Total	Thiago Silva; Brazil	278 kg	Gabriel Chhum; United States	275 kg	Howard Roche; Puerto Rico	250 kg
65 kg
Snatch	Hampton Morris; United States	137 kg	Francisco Mosquera; Colombia	135 kg	Luis Bardalez; Peru	131 kg
Clean & Jerk	Hampton Morris; United States	181 kg WR	Francisco Mosquera; Colombia	178 kg	Luis Bardalez; Peru	168 kg
Total	Hampton Morris; United States	318 kg AM	Francisco Mosquera; Colombia	313 kg	Luis Bardalez; Peru	299 kg
71 kg
Snatch	Sebastián Olivares; Colombia	146 kg	Reinner Arango; Venezuela	142 kg	Vicente Montoya; Mexico	131 kg
Clean & Jerk	Sebastián Olivares; Colombia	191 kg WR	Reinner Arango; Venezuela	172 kg	Jimmy López; Ecuador	166 kg
Total	Sebastián Olivares; Colombia	337 kg AM	Reinner Arango; Venezuela	314 kg	Jonathan Muñoz; Mexico	293 kg
79 kg
Snatch	Hugo Montes; Colombia	159 kg	Julio Mayora; Venezuela	158 kg	Caden Cahoy; United States	154 kg
Clean & Jerk	Julio Mayora; Venezuela	199 kg AM	Caden Cahoy; United States	198 kg	Hugo Montes; Colombia	188 kg
Total	Julio Mayora; Venezuela	357 kg AM	Caden Cahoy; United States	352 kg	Hugo Montes; Colombia	347 kg
88 kg
Snatch	Yeison López; Colombia	176 kg WR	Keydomar Vallenilla; Venezuela	174 kg	Arley Méndez; Chile	171 kg
Clean & Jerk	Keydomar Vallenilla; Venezuela	208 kg AM	Yeison López; Colombia	205 kg	Arley Méndez; Chile	196 kg
Total	Keydomar Vallenilla; Venezuela	382 kg AM	Yeison López; Colombia	381 kg	Arley Méndez; Chile	367 kg
94 kg
Snatch	Marcos Bonilla; Colombia	161 kg	Vicente Braulio; Ecuador	159 kg	Ángel Luna; Venezuela	155 kg
Clean & Jerk	Marcos Bonilla; Colombia	210 kg AM	Ángel Luna; Venezuela	195 kg	Mauricio Loaiza; Venezuela	193 kg
Total	Marcos Bonilla; Colombia	371 kg	Ángel Luna; Venezuela	350 kg	Vicente Braulio; Ecuador	349 kg
110 kg
Snatch	Kolbi Ferguson; United States	173 kg	Matheus Pessanha; Brazil	171 kg	Karim Saadi; Mexico	169 kg
Clean & Jerk	Kolbi Ferguson; United States	215 kg	Hernán Viera; Peru	210 kg	Xavier Lusignan; Canada	208 kg
Total	Kolbi Ferguson; United States	388 kg	Matheus Pessanha; Brazil	376 kg	Xavier Lusignan; Canada	376 kg
+110 kg
Snatch	Santiago Cossio; Colombia	191 kg	Rafael Cerro; Colombia	190 kg	Aaron Williams; United States	187 kg
Clean & Jerk	Aaron Williams; United States	224 kg	Rafael Cerro; Colombia	220 kg	Santiago Cossio; Colombia	216 kg
Total	Aaron Williams; United States	411 kg	Rafael Cerro; Colombia	410 kg	Santiago Cossio; Colombia	407 kg

=== Women ===
Event	Gold		Silver		Bronze	
48 kg
Snatch	Dahiana Ortiz; Dominican Republic	85 kg AM	Emily Figueiredo; Brazil	77 kg	Enderlin Ulacio; Venezuela	77 kg
Clean & Jerk	Dahiana Ortiz; Dominican Republic	105 kg AM	Emily Figueiredo; Brazil	100 kg	Patricia Mercado; Venezuela	99 kg
Total	Dahiana Ortiz; Dominican Republic	190 kg AM	Emily Figueiredo; Brazil	177 kg	Patricia Mercado; Venezuela	174 kg
53 kg
Snatch	Beatriz Pirón; Dominican Republic	91 kg	Jourdan Delacruz; United States	88 kg	Natasha Rosa Figueiredo; Brazil	87 kg
Clean & Jerk	Katherin Echandía; Venezuela	112 kg	Natasha Rosa Figueiredo; Brazil	111 kg	Beatriz Pirón; Dominican Republic	110 kg
Total	Beatriz Pirón; Dominican Republic	201 kg	Katherin Echandía; Venezuela	199 kg	Natasha Rosa Figueiredo; Brazil	198 kg
58 kg
Snatch	Jennifer Becerra; Ecuador	98 kg AM	Miranda Ulrey; United States	97 kg	María Luz Casadevall; Argentina	96 kg
Clean & Jerk	Miranda Ulrey; United States	120 kg	Jennifer Becerra; Ecuador	118 kg	María Luz Casadevall; Argentina	116 kg
Total	Miranda Ulrey; United States	217 kg AM	Jennifer Becerra; Ecuador	216 kg	María Luz Casadevall; Argentina	212 kg
63 kg
Snatch	Yenny Sinisterra; Colombia	104 kg AM	Génesis Rodríguez; Venezuela	99 kg	Janeth Gómez; Mexico	99 kg
Clean & Jerk	Yenny Sinisterra; Colombia	132 kg AM	Katharine Estep; United States	131 kg	Janeth Gómez; Mexico	123 kg
Total	Yenny Sinisterra; Colombia	236 kg AM	Katharine Estep; United States	228 kg	Janeth Gómez; Mexico	222 kg
69 kg
Snatch	Olivia Reeves; United States	119 kg WR	Julieth Rodríguez; Colombia	110 kg	Alexis Ashworth; Canada	98 kg
Clean & Jerk	Olivia Reeves; United States	149 kg WR	Julieth Rodríguez; Colombia	135 kg	Diana García; Mexico	123 kg
Total	Olivia Reeves; United States	268 kg WR	Julieth Rodríguez; Colombia	245 kg	Diana García; Mexico	216 kg
77 kg
Snatch	Mari Sánchez; Colombia	111 kg	Laura Amaro; Brazil	110 kg	Mattie Rogers; United States	110 kg
Clean & Jerk	Mattie Rogers; United States	139 kg	Mari Sánchez; Colombia	137 kg	Laura Amaro; Brazil	136 kg
Total	Mattie Rogers; United States	249 kg	Mari Sánchez; Colombia	248 kg	Laura Amaro; Brazil	246 kg
86 kg
Snatch	Yudelina Mejía; Dominican Republic	123 kg AM	Valeria Rivas; Colombia	111 kg	Dayana Chirinos; Venezuela	111 kg
Clean & Jerk	Yudelina Mejía; Dominican Republic	147 kg	Dayana Chirinos; Venezuela	146 kg	Valeria Rivas; Colombia	142 kg
Total	Yudelina Mejía; Dominican Republic	270 kg	Dayana Chirinos; Venezuela	257 kg	Valeria Rivas; Colombia	253 kg
+86 kg
Snatch	Crismery Santana; Dominican Republic	119 kg	Marifélix Sarría; Cuba	118 kg	Mary Theisen-Lappen; United States	117 kg
Clean & Jerk	Marifélix Sarría; Cuba	162 kg AM	Mary Theisen-Lappen; United States	161 kg	Taiane Justino; Brazil	151 kg
Total	Marifélix Sarría; Cuba	280 kg AM	Mary Theisen-Lappen; United States	278 kg	Naryury Pérez; Venezuela	265 kg

== Medal table ==
Ranking by Big (Total result) medals

* Host nation (Colombia)

Rank	Nation	Gold	Silver	Bronze	Total
1	United States	6	4	0	10
2	Colombia*	3	5	3	11
3	Dominican Republic	3	0	0	3
4	Venezuela	2	4	2	8
5	Brazil	1	2	2	5
6	Cuba	1	0	0	1
7	Ecuador	0	1	1	2
8	Mexico	0	0	3	3
9	Argentina	0	0	1	1
9	Canada	0	0	1	1
9	Chile	0	0	1	1
9	Peru	0	0	1	1
9	Puerto Rico	0	0	1	1
Totals (13 entries)		16	16	16	48

Ranking by all medals: Big (Total result) and Small (Snatch and Clean & Jerk)

* Host nation (Colombia)

Rank	Nation	Gold	Silver	Bronze	Total
1	United States	16	10	4	30
2	Colombia*	13	14	6	33
3	Dominican Republic	9	0	1	10
4	Venezuela	5	11	8	24
5	Brazil	2	8	5	15
6	Cuba	2	1	0	3
7	Ecuador	1	3	2	6
8	Peru	0	1	3	4
9	Mexico	0	0	8	8
10	Argentina	0	0	3	3
10	Canada	0	0	3	3
10	Chile	0	0	3	3
13	Guatemala	0	0	1	1
13	Puerto Rico	0	0	1	1
Totals (14 entries)		48	48	48	144

== Team ranking ==
=== Men ===
Rank	Team	Points
1	Colombia	566
2	Venezuela	525
3	United States	460
4	Mexico	455
5	Ecuador	374
6	Dominican Republic	365

=== Women ===
Rank	Team	Points
1	United States	575
2	Colombia	562
3	Dominican Republic	535
4	Venezuela	528
5	Mexico	495
6	Canada	349
