= Alexey Churkin =

Kazakhstani weightlifter (born 2004)

Personal information
- Born: 19 March 2004 (age 22)

Sport
- Country: Kazakhstan
- Sport: Weightlifting
- Weight class: 73 kg; 81 kg; 89 kg
Medal record
Men's weightlifting
Representing Kazakhstan
World Championships
Silver medal – second place	2024 Manama	81 kg
Bronze medal – third place	2022 Bogotá	73 kg
Asian Games
Silver medal – second place	2026 Aichi–Nagoya	85 kg
Asian Championships
Bronze medal – third place	2023 Jinju	73 kg
Asian Junior Championships
Gold medal – first place	2024 Doha	89 kg
Islamic Solidarity Games
Silver medal – second place	2021 Konya	73 kg S
Silver medal – second place	2021 Konya	73 kg CJ
Silver medal – second place	2021 Konya	73 kg T
Junior World Championships
Silver medal – second place	2022 Heraklion	73 kg

Alexey Churkin (born 19 March 2004) is a Kazakhstani weightlifter. He won the bronze medal in the men's 73 kg event at the 2022 World Weightlifting Championships held in Bogotá, Colombia. He won the silver medal in the men's 73 kg event at the 2021 Islamic Solidarity Games held in Konya, Turkey.

Churkin won the silver medal in his event at the 2022 Junior World Weightlifting Championships held in Heraklion, Greece.

== Achievements ==
Year	Venue	Weight	Snatch (kg)				Clean & Jerk (kg)				Total	Rank
Year	Venue	Weight	1	2	3	Rank	1	2	3	Rank	Total	Rank
World Championships
2022	Bogotá, Colombia	73 kg	145	150	153	3rd place, bronze medalist(s)	181	186	190	3rd place, bronze medalist(s)	343	3rd place, bronze medalist(s)
2024	Manama, Bahrain	81 kg	155	160	164	3rd place, bronze medalist(s)	195	200	204	2nd place, silver medalist(s)	368	2nd place, silver medalist(s)
Islamic Solidarity Games
2022	Konya, Turkey	73 kg	140	145	~~150~~	2nd place, silver medalist(s)	170	~~180~~	~~180~~	2nd place, silver medalist(s)	315	2nd place, silver medalist(s)
