= Ana Segura (weightlifter) =

Colombian weightlifter (born 1991)

Ana Iris Segura
Personal information
- Born: 26 July 1991 (age 34)

Sport
- Country: Colombia
- Sport: Weightlifting
Medal record
Representing Colombia
Women's weightlifting
World Championships
Bronze medal – third place	2017 Anaheim	48 kg
Pan American Games
Silver medal – second place	2015 Toronto	48 kg
Silver medal – second place	2019 Lima	49 kg
Central American and Caribbean Games
Gold medal – first place	2018 Barranquilla	48 kg S
Gold medal – first place	2018 Barranquilla	48 kg CJ
Bolivarian Games
Gold medal – first place	2013 Trujillo	48 kg
Gold medal – first place	2017 Santa Marta	48 kg
South American Games
Gold medal – first place	2014 Santiago	48 kg

Ana Iris Segura (born 26 July 1991) is a Colombian weightlifter. She won the silver medal in the women's 49 kg event at the 2019 Pan American Games held in Lima, Peru. She also won the silver medal in her event at the 2015 Pan American Games held in Toronto, Canada.

In February 2020, she was provisionally suspended after testing positive for the anabolic steroid boldenone. As of December 2020, her case is being contested at the Court of Arbitration for Sport as she may have ingested it after eating tainted meat and in Colombia boldenone is used for fattening cattle.
