= Yeison López =

Colombian weightlifter (born 1999)

Personal information
- Full name: Yeison López López
- Nationality: Colombian
- Born: 1 September 1999 (age 27) Istmina, Chocó

Sport
- Country: Colombia
- Sport: Weightlifting
- Weight class: 88 kg; 89 kg; 96 kg
- Coached by: Luis Arrieta

Achievements and titles
- Personal bests: Snatch: 182 kg AM (2026); Clean & jerk: 216 kg AM (2026); Total: 397 kg WR (2026)
Medal record
Representing Colombia
Men's weightlifting
Big (Total)
Event	1st	2nd	3rd
Olympic Games	0	1	0
World Championships	1	1	0
Junior World Championships	2	0	0
Youth World Championships	2	0	0
IWF World Cup	0	1	0
Pan American Games	0	1	0
Pan American Championships	3	1	0
Total	8	5	0
Big and small medals
Event	1st	2nd	3rd
Olympic Games	0	1	0
World Championships	3	2	0
Junior World Championships	6	0	0
Youth World Championships	6	0	0
IWF World Cup	1	2	0
Pan American Games	0	1	0
Pan American Championships	10	2	0
CAC Games	2	0	0
Bolivarian Games	2	0	0
Total	30	8	0
Olympic Games
Silver medal – second place	2024 Paris	89 kg
World Championships
Gold medal – first place	2025 Førde	88 kg
Silver medal – second place	2026 Ningbo	85 kg
IWF World Cup
Silver medal – second place	2024 Phuket	89 kg
Pan American Games
Silver medal – second place	2023 Santiago	89 kg
Pan American Championships
Gold medal – first place	2017 Miami	77 kg
Gold medal – first place	2024 Caracas	89 kg
Gold medal – first place	2026 Panama City	88 kg
Silver medal – second place	2025 Cali	88 kg
Central American and Caribbean Games
Gold medal – first place	2026 Santo Domingo	88 kg S
Gold medal – first place	2026 Santo Domingo	88 kg CJ
Bolivarian Games
Gold medal – first place	2025 Lima-Ayacucho	88 kg S
Gold medal – first place	2025 Lima-Ayacucho	88 kg CJ
Junior World Championships
Gold medal – first place	2016 Tbilisi	77 kg
Gold medal – first place	2017 Tokyo	77 kg
Youth World Championships
Gold medal – first place	2015 Lima	77 kg
Gold medal – first place	2016 Penang	77 kg

Yeison López López (born 1 September 1999) is a Colombian weightlifter. He competed at the 2024 Summer Olympics, where he won the silver medal.

== Career ==
López took up weightlifting in 2016 and followed his cousin, Wilmer Hernan Torres Lopez who was the 2010 Pan American overall champion in the 94 kg weight class.

In August 2024, López competed in the men's 89 kg event at the 2024 Summer Olympics held in Paris, France. He lifted 390 kg in total and won a silver medal. Three weeks before that he had had a back injury.

== Achievements ==
Year	Venue	Weight	Snatch (kg)				Clean & Jerk (kg)				Total	Rank
Year	Venue	Weight	1	2	3	Rank	1	2	3	Rank	Total	Rank
Representing Colombia
Olympic Games
2024	Paris, France	89 kg	175	~~180~~	180	—N/a	~~205~~	205	210	—N/a	390	2nd place, silver medalist(s)
World Championships
2023	Riyadh, Saudi Arabia	96 kg	160	167	171	4	~~200~~	200	~~205~~	11	371	7
2025	Førde, Norway	88 kg	173	177 WR	~~180~~	1st place, gold medalist(s)	~~205~~	205	210 AM	2nd place, silver medalist(s)	387 WR	1st place, gold medalist(s)
IWF World Cup
2024	Phuket, Thailand	89 kg	175	~~181~~	182 WR	1st place, gold medalist(s)	205	210	~~215~~	2nd place, silver medalist(s)	392 AM	2nd place, silver medalist(s)
Pan American Games
2023	Santiago, Chile	89 kg	168	172	177 AM	—N/a	201	205	~~209~~	—N/a	382	2nd place, silver medalist(s)
Pan American Championships
2017	Miami, United States	77 kg	153	158	162 AM	1st place, gold medalist(s)	187	190	~~200~~	1st place, gold medalist(s)	352	1st place, gold medalist(s)
2024	Caracas, Venezuela	89 kg	170	175	—	1st place, gold medalist(s)	200	205	207	1st place, gold medalist(s)	382	1st place, gold medalist(s)
2025	Cali, Colombia	88 kg	170	176 WR	~~180~~	1st place, gold medalist(s)	205	~~210~~	~~212~~	2nd place, silver medalist(s)	381	2nd place, silver medalist(s)
2026	Panama City, Panama	88 kg	170	178	181 WR	1st place, gold medalist(s)	200	216 WR	—	1st place, gold medalist(s)	397 WR	1st place, gold medalist(s)
Central American and Caribbean Games
2026	Santo Domingo, Dominican Republic	88 kg	~~170~~	170	182 AM	1st place, gold medalist(s)	202	204	~~218~~	1st place, gold medalist(s)	—N/a	—N/a
Bolivarian Games
2025	Lima, Peru	88 kg	167	169	—	1st place, gold medalist(s)	203	215 AM	—	1st place, gold medalist(s)	—N/a	—N/a
Junior World Championships
2016	Tbilisi, Georgia	77 kg	153	~~156~~	156	1st place, gold medalist(s)	185	190	—	1st place, gold medalist(s)	346	1st place, gold medalist(s)
2017	Tokyo, Japan	77 kg	154	157	161	1st place, gold medalist(s)	185	188	195	1st place, gold medalist(s)	356	1st place, gold medalist(s)
Youth World Championships
2015	Lima, Peru	77 kg	128	131	135	1st place, gold medalist(s)	157	162	~~165~~	1st place, gold medalist(s)	297	1st place, gold medalist(s)
2016	Penang, Malaysia	77 kg	152	157	160 YWR	1st place, gold medalist(s)	185	191	~~195~~	1st place, gold medalist(s)	351 YWR	1st place, gold medalist(s)
