= List of Venezuelan records in Olympic weightlifting =

The following are the national records in Olympic weightlifting in Venezuela. Records are maintained in each weight class for the snatch lift, clean and jerk lift, and the total for both lifts by the Federacion Venezolana de Levant. de Pesas.

== Current records ==
=== Men ===
Event	Record	Athlete	Date	Meet	Place	Ref
60 kg
Snatch	kg					
Clean & Jerk	kg					
Total	kg					
65 kg
Snatch	126 kg	Wilkeinner Lugo	5 August 2026	CAC Games	Santo Domingo, Dominican Republic	
Clean & Jerk	166 kg	Wilkeinner Lugo	5 August 2026	CAC Games	Santo Domingo, Dominican Republic	
Total	292 kg	Wilkeinner Lugo	5 August 2026	CAC Games	Santo Domingo, Dominican Republic	
71 kg
Snatch	150 kg	Reinner Arango	23 November 2025	Bolivarian Games	Lima, Peru	
Clean & Jerk	175 kg	Reinner Arango	23 November 2025	Bolivarian Games	Lima, Peru	
Total	325 kg	Reinner Arango	23 November 2025	Bolivarian Games	Lima, Peru	
79 kg
Snatch	162 kg	Julio Mayora	24 November 2025	Bolivarian Games	Lima, Peru	
Clean & Jerk	199 kg	Julio Mayora	15 July 2025	Pan American Championships	Cali, Colombia	
Total	357 kg	Julio Mayora	15 July 2025	Pan American Championships	Cali, Colombia	
85 kg
Snatch	170 kg	Ángel Rodríguez	2 November 2026	World Championships	Ningbo, China	
Clean & Jerk	203 kg	Ángel Rodríguez	16 September 2026	South American Games	Rosario, Argentina	
Total	367 kg	Ángel Rodríguez	16 September 2026	South American Games	Rosario, Argentina	
94 kg
Snatch	177 kg	Keydomar Vallenilla	29 April 2026	Pan American Championships	Panama City, Panama	
Clean & Jerk	216 kg	Keydomar Vallenilla	24 November 2025	Bolivarian Games	Lima, Peru	
Total	392 kg	Keydomar Vallenilla	24 November 2025	Bolivarian Games	Lima, Peru	
110 kg
Snatch	171 kg	Mauricio Loaiza	8 August 2026	CAC Games	Santo Domingo, Dominican Republic	
Clean & Jerk	211 kg	Mauricio Loaiza	8 August 2026	CAC Games	Santo Domingo, Dominican Republic	
Total	382 kg	Mauricio Loaiza	8 August 2026	CAC Games	Santo Domingo, Dominican Republic	
+110 kg
Snatch	kg					
Clean & Jerk	kg					
Total	kg					

=== Women ===
Event	Record	Athlete	Date	Meet	Place	Ref
83 kg
Snatch	83 kg	Patricia Mercado	5 August 2026	CAC Games	Santo Domingo, Dominican Republic	
Clean & Jerk	100 kg	Enderlin Ulacio	4 October 2026	Pan American Junior Championships	Tepic, Mexico	
Total	182 kg	Patricia Mercado	5 August 2026	CAC Games	Santo Domingo, Dominican Republic	
53 kg
Snatch	87 kg	Katherin Echandía	5 August 2026	CAC Games	Santo Domingo, Dominican Republic	
Clean & Jerk	109 kg	Katherin Echandía	5 August 2026	CAC Games	Santo Domingo, Dominican Republic	
Total	196 kg	Katherin Echandía	5 August 2026	CAC Games	Santo Domingo, Dominican Republic	
57 kg
Snatch	90 kg	Yilihannys Jiménez	27 August 2026	South American Junior Championships	Guayaquil, Ecuador	
Clean & Jerk	115 kg	Yilihannys Jiménez	27 August 2026	South American Junior Championships	Guayaquil, Ecuador	
Total	205 kg	Yilihannys Jiménez	27 August 2026	South American Junior Championships	Guayaquil, Ecuador	
63 kg
Snatch	kg					
Clean & Jerk	kg					
Total	kg					
69 kg
Snatch	108 kg	Claudia Rengifo	5 May 2026	World Junior Championships	Ismailia, Egypt	
Clean & Jerk	133 kg	Claudia Rengifo	16 September 2026	South American Games	Rosario, Argentina	
Total	243 kg	Claudia Rengifo	16 September 2026	South American Games	Rosario, Argentina	
77 kg
Snatch						
Clean & Jerk						
Total						
86 kg
Snatch						
Clean & Jerk						
Total						
+86 kg
Snatch						
Clean & Jerk						
Total						

== Historical records ==
=== Men (2018-2025) ===
Event	Record	Athlete	Date	Meet	Place	Ref
55 kg
Snatch	106 kg	Winder Sánchez	November 2021	Pan American Championships	Guayaquil, Ecuador	
Clean & Jerk	136 kg	Winder Sánchez	November 2021	Pan American Championships	Guayaquil, Ecuador	
Total	242 kg	Winder Sánchez	November 2021	Pan American Championships	Guayaquil, Ecuador	
61 kg
Snatch	125 kg	Wilkeinner Lugo	24 June 2023	CAC Games	San Salvador, El Salvador	
Clean & Jerk	151 kg	Wilkeinner Lugo	24 June 2023	CAC Games	San Salvador, El Salvador	
Total	276 kg	Wilkeinner Lugo	24 June 2023	CAC Games	San Salvador, El Salvador	
67 kg
Snatch	147 kg	Julio Mayora	4 November 2018	World Championships	Ashgabat, Turkmenistan	
Clean & Jerk	175 kg	Julio Mayora	4 November 2018	World Championships	Ashgabat, Turkmenistan	
Total	322 kg	Julio Mayora	4 November 2018	World Championships	Ashgabat, Turkmenistan	
73 kg
Snatch	160 kg	Julio Mayora	2 July 2022	Bolivarian Games	Valledupar, Colombia	
Clean & Jerk	194 kg	Julio Mayora	28 July 2019	Pan American Games	Lima, Peru	
Total	349 kg	Julio Mayora	28 July 2019	Pan American Games	Lima, Peru	
81 kg
Snatch	161 kg	Ángel Rodríguez	28 November 2024	Bolivarian Games	Ayacucho, Peru	
Clean & Jerk	186 kg	Darvin Castro	November 2021	Pan American Championships	Guayaquil, Ecuador	
Total	335 kg	Darvin Castro	November 2021	Pan American Championships	Guayaquil, Ecuador	
89 kg
Snatch	175 kg	Keydomar Vallenilla	11 December 2022	World Championships	Bogotá, Colombia	
Clean & Jerk	212 kg	Keydomar Vallenilla	30 March 2023	Pan American Championships	Bariloche, Argentina	
Total	385 kg	Keydomar Vallenilla	11 December 2022	World Championships	Bogotá, Colombia	
96 kg
Snatch	178 kg	Keydomar Vallenilla	4 October 2022	South American Games	Asunción, Paraguay	
Clean & Jerk	216 kg	Keydomar Vallenilla	4 October 2022	South American Games	Asunción, Paraguay	
Total	394 kg	Keydomar Vallenilla	4 October 2022	South American Games	Asunción, Paraguay	
102 kg
Snatch	166 kg	Jhohan Sanguino	14 June 2023	IWF Grand Prix	Havana, Cuba	
Clean & Jerk	212 kg	Jeyson Arias	27 February 2024	Pan American Championships	Caracas, Venezuela	
Total	375 kg	Jeyson Arias	27 February 2024	Pan American Championships	Caracas, Venezuela	
109 kg
Snatch	178 kg	Jesús González	29 July 2019	Pan American Games	Lima, Peru	
Clean & Jerk	210 kg	Jesús González	29 July 2019	Pan American Games	Lima, Peru	
Total	388 kg	Jesús González	29 July 2019	Pan American Games	Lima, Peru	
+109 kg
Snatch						
Clean & Jerk						
Total						

=== Women (2018-2025) ===
Event	Record	Athlete	Date	Meet	Place	Ref
45 kg
Snatch	74 kg	Rosieles Quintana	18 April 2023	Central American & Caribbean Championships	Santo Domingo, Dominican Republic	
Clean & Jerk	91 kg	Rosieles Quintana	18 April 2023	Central American & Caribbean Championships	Santo Domingo, Dominican Republic	
Total	165 kg	Rosieles Quintana	18 April 2023	Central American & Caribbean Championships	Santo Domingo, Dominican Republic	
49 kg
Snatch	85 kg	Katherin Echandia	1 April 2024	World Cup	Phuket, Thailand	
Clean & Jerk	108 kg	Katherin Echandia	1 April 2024	World Cup	Phuket, Thailand	
Total	193 kg	Katherin Echandia	1 April 2024	World Cup	Phuket, Thailand	
55 kg
Snatch	96 kg	Génesis Rodríguez	5 December 2018	International CSLP Cup	Guayaquil, Ecuador	
Clean & Jerk	116 kg	Génesis Rodríguez	28 July 2019	Pan American Games	Lima, Peru	
Total	212 kg	Génesis Rodríguez	28 July 2019	Pan American Games	Lima, Peru	
59 kg
Snatch	103 kg	Anyelin Venegas	3 April 2024	World Cup	Phuket, Thailand	
Clean & Jerk	126 kg	Anyelin Venegas	25 February 2024	Pan American Championships	Caracas, Venezuela	
Total	229 kg	Anyelin Venegas	3 April 2024	World Cup	Phuket, Thailand	
64 kg
Snatch	93 kg	Eliannys Franco	10 September 2023	World Championships	Riyadh, Saudi Arabia	
Clean & Jerk	117 kg	Eliannys Franco	20 April 2023	Central American & Caribbean Championships	Santo Domingo, Dominican Republic	
Total	207 kg	Eliannys Franco	20 April 2023	Central American & Caribbean Championships	Santo Domingo, Dominican Republic	
71 kg
Snatch	99 kg	Laura Peinado	12 September 2023	World Championships	Riyadh, Saudi Arabia	
Clean & Jerk						
Total						
76 kg
Snatch	103 kg	Laura Peinado	21 April 2023	Central American & Caribbean Championships	Santo Domingo, Dominican Republic	
Clean & Jerk	122 kg	Laura Peinado	21 April 2023	Central American & Caribbean Championships	Santo Domingo, Dominican Republic	
Total	225 kg	Laura Peinado	21 April 2023	Central American & Caribbean Championships	Santo Domingo, Dominican Republic	
81 kg
Snatch	105 kg	Dayana Chirinos	9 April 2024	World Cup	Phuket, Thailand	
Clean & Jerk	135 kg	Dayana Chirinos	9 April 2024	World Cup	Phuket, Thailand	
Total	240 kg	Dayana Chirinos	9 April 2024	World Cup	Phuket, Thailand	
87 kg
Snatch	112 kg	Naryury Pérez	30 July 2019	Pan American Games	Lima, Peru	
Clean & Jerk	140 kg	Naryury Pérez	30 July 2019	Pan American Games	Lima, Peru	
Total	252 kg	Naryury Pérez	30 July 2019	Pan American Games	Lima, Peru	
+87 kg
Snatch	119 kg	Naryury Perez	10 April 2024	World Cup	Phuket, Thailand	
Clean & Jerk	149 kg	Naryury Perez	27 June 2023	CAC Games	San Salvador, El Salvador	
Total	267 kg	Naryury Perez	10 April 2024	World Cup	Phuket, Thailand	

=== Men (1998–2018) ===
Event	Record	Athlete	Date	Meet	Place	Ref
-56 kg
Snatch						
Clean & Jerk						
Total						
-62 kg
Snatch						
Clean & Jerk						
Total						
-69 kg
Snatch	150 kg	Junior Sánchez	18 November 2013	Bolivarian Games	Trujillo, Peru	
Clean & Jerk						
Total						
-77 kg
Snatch						
Clean & Jerk						
Total						
-85 kg
Snatch	160 kg	Keidomar Vallenilla	30 May 2018	South American Games	Cochabamba, Bolivia	
Clean & Jerk	200 kg	Keidomar Vallenilla	30 May 2018	South American Games	Cochabamba, Bolivia	
Total	360 kg	Keidomar Vallenilla	30 May 2018	South American Games	Cochabamba, Bolivia	
-94 kg
Snatch						
Clean & Jerk						
Total	395 kg	Julio Luna	15 August 2003	Pan American Games	Santo Domingo, Dominican Republic	
-105 kg
Snatch						
Clean & Jerk						
Total						
+105 kg
Snatch						
Clean & Jerk						
Total						

=== Women (1998–2018) ===
Event	Record	Athlete	Date	Meet	Place	Ref
48 kg
Snatch						
Clean & Jerk						
Total						
53 kg
Snatch						
Clean & Jerk						
Total						
58 kg
Snatch						
Clean & Jerk						
Total						
63 kg
Snatch						
Clean & Jerk						
Total						
69 kg
Snatch						
Clean & Jerk						
Total						
75 kg
Snatch						
Clean & Jerk						
Total						
90 kg
Snatch						
Clean & Jerk	133 kg	Naryuri Perez	July 2017	Pan American Championships	Miami, United States	
Total						
+90 kg
Snatch	114 kg	Yaniuska Espinoza	September 2017	Central American and Caribbean Championships	Guatemala City, Guatemala	
Clean & Jerk	140 kg	Yaniuska Espinoza	September 2017	Central American and Caribbean Championships	Guatemala City, Guatemala	
Total	254 kg	Yaniuska Espinoza	September 2017	Central American and Caribbean Championships	Guatemala City, Guatemala	
