= Weightlifting at the 2022 Bolivarian Games – Results =

The weightlifting competitions at the 2022 Bolivarian Games took place in the Polideportivo Colegio Andrés Escobar Court in Valledupar, Colombia from 1 to 5 July 2022.

== Results ==
=== Men's 55 kg ===
Athlete	Group	Snatch (kg)				Clean & Jerk (kg)			
Athlete	Group	1	2	3	Rank	1	2	3	Rank
Miguel Suárez (COL)	A	100	105	~~108~~	1st place, gold medalist(s)	129	135	140	1st place, gold medalist(s)
Jhony Arteaga (ECU)	A	93	96	98	2nd place, silver medalist(s)	120	~~127~~	~~128~~	3rd place, bronze medalist(s)
Abraham Rivera (VEN)	A	90	95	97	3rd place, bronze medalist(s)	~~118~~	118	127	2nd place, silver medalist(s)

=== Men's 61 kg ===
Athlete	Group	Snatch (kg)				Clean & Jerk (kg)			
Athlete	Group	1	2	3	Rank	1	2	3	Rank
Habib de las Salas (COL)	A	118	121	~~124~~	1st place, gold medalist(s)	147	~~153~~	153	1st place, gold medalist(s)
Víctor Garrido (ECU)	A	115	119	~~122~~	2nd place, silver medalist(s)	~~142~~	~~142~~	142	3rd place, bronze medalist(s)
Estiven Villar (COL)	A	114	118	~~122~~	3rd place, bronze medalist(s)	140	144	~~152~~	2nd place, silver medalist(s)
Fabian Márquez (VEN)	A	111	~~116~~	116	4	~~141~~	~~142~~	~~142~~	—
David Garcia (VEN)	A	~~110~~	110	~~116~~	5	134	141	~~143~~	4
Marcos Rojas (PER)	A	~~104~~	104	107	6	135	~~138~~	—	5
Luis Peguero (DOM)	A	102	106	~~110~~	7	125	130	~~135~~	7
Ricardo Cardenas (CHI)	A	100	~~103~~	~~103~~	8	130	133	135	6
Juan Martínez (PAN)	A	95	~~100~~	100	9	112	116	120	8

=== Men's 67 kg ===
Athlete	Group	Snatch (kg)				Clean & Jerk (kg)			
Athlete	Group	1	2	3	Rank	1	2	3	Rank
Francisco Mosquera (COL)	A	~~132~~	133	138	1st place, gold medalist(s)	170	176	183	1st place, gold medalist(s)
Jair Reyes (ECU)	A	~~131~~	132	137	2nd place, silver medalist(s)	164	166	175	2nd place, silver medalist(s)
Reinner Arango (VEN)	A	127	~~132~~	~~134~~	3rd place, bronze medalist(s)	~~160~~	161	~~163~~	4
Luis Bardalez (PER)	A	127	~~131~~	~~131~~	4	160	162	165	3rd place, bronze medalist(s)
Ronnier Martinez (PAN)	A	~~115~~	115	~~120~~	5	147	~~151~~	~~151~~	5

=== Men's 73 kg ===
Athlete	Group	Snatch (kg)				Clean & Jerk (kg)			
Athlete	Group	1	2	3	Rank	1	2	3	Rank
Julio Mayora (VEN)	A	148	151	160 AM	1st place, gold medalist(s)	185	~~191~~	~~191~~	1st place, gold medalist(s)
Luis Javier Mosquera (COL)	A	145	150	~~153~~	2nd place, silver medalist(s)	175	~~186~~	—	2nd place, silver medalist(s)
Sergio Cares (CHI)	A	122	126	128	3rd place, bronze medalist(s)	145	~~153~~	~~157~~	4
Francisco Tonton (DOM)	A	120	127	~~129~~	4	152	158	~~161~~	3rd place, bronze medalist(s)
Santiago Villegas (PER)	A	~~123~~	123	~~128~~	5	~~156~~	~~159~~	~~160~~	—

=== Men's 81 kg ===
Athlete	Group	Snatch (kg)				Clean & Jerk (kg)			
Athlete	Group	1	2	3	Rank	1	2	3	Rank
Darvin Castro (VEN)	A	135	145	—	1st place, gold medalist(s)	176	181	184	1st place, gold medalist(s)
Gustavo Maldonado (COL)	A	125	132	134	2nd place, silver medalist(s)	175	180	183	2nd place, silver medalist(s)
Yendri Benitez (DOM)	A	115	~~130~~	133	3rd place, bronze medalist(s)	140	161	~~165~~	3rd place, bronze medalist(s)
Juan Nemer (BOL)	A	85	~~100~~	~~105~~	4	~~115~~	~~115~~	~~115~~	—

=== Men's 89 kg ===
Athlete	Group	Snatch (kg)				Clean & Jerk (kg)			
Athlete	Group	1	2	3	Rank	1	2	3	Rank
Brayan Rodallegas (COL)	A	~~155~~	155	170	1st place, gold medalist(s)	190	205	—	1st place, gold medalist(s)
Iván Escudero (ECU)	A	146	148	150	2nd place, silver medalist(s)	165	181	187	2nd place, silver medalist(s)
Nerwis Maneiro (VEN)	A	~~140~~	140	147	3rd place, bronze medalist(s)	176	182	~~188~~	3rd place, bronze medalist(s)

=== Men's 96 kg ===
Athlete	Group	Snatch (kg)				Clean & Jerk (kg)			
Athlete	Group	1	2	3	Rank	1	2	3	Rank
Jhor Moreno (COL)	A	165	~~170~~	170	1st place, gold medalist(s)	195	202	~~207~~	2nd place, silver medalist(s)
Keydomar Vallenilla (VEN)	A	~~167~~	~~167~~	167	2nd place, silver medalist(s)	201	206	210	1st place, gold medalist(s)
Amel Atencia (PER)	A	~~140~~	140	—	3rd place, bronze medalist(s)	170	182	~~192~~	3
Jose Volquez (DOM)	A	125	132	~~136~~	4	150	160	~~165~~	5
Juan Prieto (PAR)	A	~~130~~	130	~~136~~	5	~~166~~	~~166~~	166	4

=== Men's 102 kg ===
Athlete	Group	Snatch (kg)				Clean & Jerk (kg)			
Athlete	Group	1	2	3	Rank	1	2	3	Rank
Yeimar Mendoza (COL)	A	155	~~162~~	162	1st place, gold medalist(s)	190	195	197	1st place, gold medalist(s)
Wilmer Contreras (ECU)	A	147	152	154	2nd place, silver medalist(s)	182	188	~~192~~	3rd place, bronze medalist(s)
Pedro Diaz (VEN)	A	145	151	153	3rd place, bronze medalist(s)	185	191	196	2nd place, silver medalist(s)

=== Men's 109 kg ===
Athlete	Group	Snatch (kg)				Clean & Jerk (kg)			
Athlete	Group	1	2	3	Rank	1	2	3	Rank
Andrés Serna (COL)	A	160	165	167	1st place, gold medalist(s)	195	200	~~210~~	1st place, gold medalist(s)
Jhohan Sanguino (VEN)	A	155	~~163~~	166	2nd place, silver medalist(s)	185	196	~~203~~	2nd place, silver medalist(s)
Confesor Santana (DOM)	A	125	~~135~~	—	3rd place, bronze medalist(s)	140	—	—	3rd place, bronze medalist(s)

=== Men's +109 kg ===
Athlete	Group	Snatch (kg)				Clean & Jerk (kg)			
Athlete	Group	1	2	3	Rank	1	2	3	Rank
Dixon Arroyo (ECU)	A	161	170	180	1st place, gold medalist(s)	190	196	201	1st place, gold medalist(s)
Hernán Viera (PER)	A	140	~~145~~	~~145~~	2nd place, silver medalist(s)	176	~~191~~	200	2nd place, silver medalist(s)
Alonso Bizama (CHI)	A	120	135	~~141~~	3rd place, bronze medalist(s)	160	~~170~~	175	3rd place, bronze medalist(s)

=== Women's 45 kg ===
Athlete	Group	Snatch (kg)				Clean & Jerk (kg)			
Athlete	Group	1	2	3	Rank	1	2	3	Rank
Manuela Berrío (COL)	A	70	74	76	1st place, gold medalist(s)	90	94	96	1st place, gold medalist(s)
Rosielis Quintana (VEN)	A	70	~~74~~	75	2nd place, silver medalist(s)	88	93	~~95~~	2nd place, silver medalist(s)
Kerlys Montilla (VEN)	A	67	~~69~~	69	3rd place, bronze medalist(s)	83	~~87~~	~~89~~	3rd place, bronze medalist(s)
Katherine Landeros (CHI)	A	62	65	68	4	~~84~~	~~84~~	~~84~~	—
Sara Saucedo (BOL)	A	~~48~~	58	51	5	66	70	~~73~~	4

=== Women's 49 kg ===
Athlete	Group	Snatch (kg)				Clean & Jerk (kg)			
Athlete	Group	1	2	3	Rank	1	2	3	Rank
Katherin Echandia (VEN)	A	~~78~~	78	—	1st place, gold medalist(s)	96	—	—	1st place, gold medalist(s)
Candida Vásquez (DOM)	A	72	77	~~80~~	2nd place, silver medalist(s)	~~95~~	~~95~~	95	2nd place, silver medalist(s)
Anali Saldarriaga (PER)	A	~~63~~	63	~~66~~	3rd place, bronze medalist(s)	~~81~~	81	84	3rd place, bronze medalist(s)
Yessica Torrez (BOL)	A	62	~~64~~	~~65~~	4	80	~~84~~	84	—

=== Women's 55 kg ===
Athlete	Group	Snatch (kg)				Clean & Jerk (kg)				Total (kg)
Athlete	Group	1	2	3	Rank	1	2	3	Rank	1
Génesis Rodríguez (VEN)	A	87	—	—	1st place, gold medalist(s)	~~108~~	108	—	1st place, gold medalist(s)	195
Jennifer Hernández (ECU)	A	80	84	~~87~~	2nd place, silver medalist(s)	102	105	108	2nd place, silver medalist(s)	192
Shoely Mego (PER)	A	77	81	~~85~~	3rd place, bronze medalist(s)	100	104	107	3rd place, bronze medalist(s)	188
Santa Cotes (DOM)	A	70	73	76	4	~~85~~	85	~~90~~	4	161

=== Women's 59 kg ===
Athlete	Group	Snatch (kg)				Clean & Jerk (kg)				Total (kg)
Athlete	Group	1	2	3	Rank	1	2	3	Rank	
Yenny Álvarez (COL)	A	95	98	—	1st place, gold medalist(s)	120	125	—	1st place, gold medalist(s)	223
Concepción Úsuga (COL)	A	~~90~~	90	96	2nd place, silver medalist(s)	113	118	~~122~~	2nd place, silver medalist(s)	214
Jenifer Becerra (ECU)	A	85	88	90	3rd place, bronze medalist(s)	108	111	~~114~~	3rd place, bronze medalist(s)	201
Roselyn Uzcategui (VEN)	A	86	89	~~91~~	4	107	110	~~113~~	4	199
Liliana Sanchez (DOM)	A	75	78	~~80~~	5	~~97~~	~~97~~	97	4	175

=== Women's 64 kg ===
Athlete	Group	Snatch (kg)				Clean & Jerk (kg)				Total (kg)
Athlete	Group	1	2	3	Rank	1	2	3	Rank	
Natalia Llamosa (COL)	A	100	103	105	1st place, gold medalist(s)	122	126	~~129~~	2nd place, silver medalist(s)	231
Julieth Rodríguez (COL)	A	98	~~101~~	102	2nd place, silver medalist(s)	120	125	128	1st place, gold medalist(s)	230
Alexandra Escobar (ECU)	A	89	92	~~95~~	4	112	115	~~118~~	3rd place, bronze medalist(s)	207
Eldi Paredes (PER)	A	84	~~87~~	87	5	~~108~~	108	~~111~~	4	195
Seylin Gomez (DOM)	A	79	82	~~86~~	5	100	~~105~~	~~107~~	5	182
Kareen Fernandez (VEN)	A	90	93	~~95~~	3rd place, bronze medalist(s)	~~111~~	~~111~~	~~113~~	—	—

=== Women's 71 kg ===
Athlete	Group	Snatch (kg)				Clean & Jerk (kg)				Total(kg)
Athlete	Group	1	2	3	Rank	1	2	3	Rank	
Mari Sánchez (COL)	A	105	108	111	2nd place, silver medalist(s)	129	131	135	1st place, gold medalist(s)	246
Angie Palacios (ECU)	A	105	109	112	1st place, gold medalist(s)	126	130	~~135~~	3rd place, bronze medalist(s)	242
Miyareth Mendoza (COL)	A	~~106~~	106	110	3rd place, bronze medalist(s)	128	132	~~136~~	2nd place, silver medalist(s)	232
Miriana Velasquez (CHI)	A	74	78	81	4	97	103	~~109~~	4	184

=== Women's 76 kg ===
Athlete	Group	Snatch (kg)				Clean & Jerk (kg)				Total(kg)
Athlete	Group	1	2	3	Rank	1	2	3	Rank	1
Mailyng Echeverría (COL)	A	99	103	106	1st place, gold medalist(s)	125	130	132	1st place, gold medalist(s)	238
Bella Paredes (ECU)	A	98	102	105	2nd place, silver medalist(s)	126	~~131~~	131	2nd place, silver medalist(s)	236
Laura Peinado (VEN)	A	~~96~~	96	98	3rd place, bronze medalist(s)	120	125	127	3rd place, bronze medalist(s)	225
Kelin Jiménez (ECU)	A	91	95	97	4	121	126	~~128~~	4	223

=== Women's 81 kg ===
Athlete	Group	Snatch (kg)				Clean & Jerk (kg)				Total(kg)
Athlete	Group	1	2	3	Rank	1	2	3	Rank	1
Neisi Dájomes (ECU)	A	110	115	—	1st place, gold medalist(s)	135	140	—	1st place, gold medalist(s)	255
Valeria Rivas (COL)	A	105	~~110~~	110	2nd place, silver medalist(s)	~~130~~	130	—	2nd place, silver medalist(s)	240
Veronica Vega (DOM)	A	80	87	93	3rd place, bronze medalist(s)	100	110	~~115~~	3rd place, bronze medalist(s)	203

=== Women's 87 kg ===
Athlete	Group	Snatch (kg)				Clean & Jerk (kg)				Total(kg)
Athlete	Group	1	2	3	Rank	1	2	3	Rank	1
Tamara Salazar (ECU)	A	106	110	—	1st place, gold medalist(s)	135	140	145	1st place, gold medalist(s)	255
Dayana Chirinos (VEN)	A	103	106	~~111~~	3rd place, bronze medalist(s)	133	136	~~141~~	2nd place, silver medalist(s)	242
Yeinny Geles (COL)	A	106	~~110~~	~~111~~	2nd place, silver medalist(s)	130	~~135~~	~~135~~	3rd place, bronze medalist(s)	236
Naryury Pérez (VEN)	A	102	~~105~~	105	4	125	~~131~~	~~132~~	4	230
Carla Angulo (ECU)	A	89	94	~~97~~	5	110	115	~~118~~	5	209

=== Women's +87 kg ===
Athlete	Group	Snatch (kg)				Clean & Jerk (kg)			
Athlete	Group	1	2	3	Rank	1	2	3	Rank
Lisseth Ayoví (ECU)	A	105	~~109~~	110	1st place, gold medalist(s)	132	134	140	1st place, gold medalist(s)
Yaniuska Espinosa (VEN)	A	104	108	~~111~~	2nd place, silver medalist(s)	125	133	~~143~~	2nd place, silver medalist(s)
Mariadni Batista (PAN)	A	85	90	94	3rd place, bronze medalist(s)	105	111	115	3rd place, bronze medalist(s)
