= Weightlifting at the 2026 South American Games =

Weightlifting competitions at the 2026 South American Games

- Venue: Gimnasio N° 5
- Dates: September 14–17
- Competitors: 83 from 11 nations

Weightlifting competitions at the 2026 South American Games in Rosario, Santa Fe, and Rafaela, Argentina, were held between September 14 and 17 at Gimnasio N° 5, located within Parque de la Independencia in Rosario.

A total of 16 events were contested (eight men's and eight women's).

== Medal summary ==
=== Medal table ===
* Host nation (Argentina)

Rank	Nation	Gold	Silver	Bronze	Total
1	Colombia	7	5	1	13
2	Venezuela	7	3	1	11
3	Ecuador	1	2	4	7
4	Brazil	1	2	3	6
5	Peru	0	2	3	5
6	Chile	0	1	3	4
7	Argentina*	0	1	0	1
8	Paraguay	0	0	1	1
Totals (8 entries)		16	16	16	48

=== Medalists ===
==== Men ====
Event	Gold		Silver		Bronze	
60 kg	Duván Ferrer; Colombia	260 kg	Jefferson Gómez; Venezuela	250 kg	Alexandro Liuzzi; Paraguay	227 kg
65 kg	Francisco Mosquera; Colombia	298 kg	Luis Bardalez; Peru	296 kg	Thiago Silva; Brazil	290 kg
70 kg	Luis Javier Mosquera; Colombia	323 kg	Dionangel Vargas; Venezuela	303 kg	Miguel Ángel Preciado; Peru	275 kg
75 kg	Julio Mayora; Venezuela	332 kg	Jair Reyes; Ecuador	327 kg	Sergio Cares; Chile	297 kg
85 kg	Ángel Rodríguez; Venezuela	367 kg	Gustavo Maldonado; Colombia	346 kg	Neiser Grefa; Ecuador	343 kg
95 kg	Keydomar Vallenilla; Venezuela	383 kg	Marcos Bonilla; Colombia	361 kg	Juan Guadamud; Ecuador	360 kg
110 kg	Matheus Pessanha; Brazil	391 kg	Mauricio Loaiza; Venezuela	381 kg	Nicolás Cuevas; Chile	342 kg
+110 kg	Rafael Cerro; Colombia	415 kg	Gabriel Portela; Brazil	381 kg	Alonso Bizama; Chile	377 kg

==== Women ====
Event	Gold		Silver		Bronze	
49 kg	Nayive Medina; Colombia	173 kg	Macarena García; Chile	157 kg	Faviana Gavidia; Peru	150 kg
53 kg	Katherin Echandía; Venezuela	198 kg	Rohelys Galvis; Colombia	190 kg	Natasha Rosa Figueiredo; Brazil	189 kg
57 kg	Yilihannys Jiménez; Venezuela	199 kg	Shoely Mego; Peru	197 kg	Antonina Moya; Colombia	195 kg
61 kg	Karen Mosquera; Colombia	230 kg	María Luz Casadevall; Argentina	225 kg	Nadia Vela; Peru	196 kg
69 kg	Claudia Rengifo; Venezuela	243 kg	Julieth Rodríguez; Colombia	241 kg	Bella Paredes; Ecuador	233 kg
77 kg	María Mena; Colombia	250 kg	Angie Palacios; Ecuador	245 kg	Laura Amaro; Brazil	233 kg
86 kg	Neisi Dájomes; Ecuador	253 kg	Valeria Rivas; Colombia	252 kg	Lidysmar Aparicio; Venezuela	235 kg
+86 kg	Naryury Pérez; Venezuela	270 kg	Taiane Justino; Brazil	263 kg	Lisseth Ayoví; Ecuador	246 kg

== Participation ==
Eleven nations participated in the weightlifting events of the 2026 South American Games.

- Argentina (9)
- Bolivia (4)
- Brazil (6)
- Chile (5)
- Colombia (16)
- Ecuador (7)
- Panama (3)
- Paraguay (4)
- Peru (11)
- Uruguay (2)
- Venezuela (16)

== Results ==
=== Men's 60 kg ===
Rank	Athlete	Nation	Snatch (kg)				Clean & Jerk (kg)				Total
Rank	Athlete	Nation	1	2	3	Result	1	2	3	Result	Total
1st place, gold medalist(s)	Duván Ferrer	Colombia	115	~~120~~	120	120	140	~~147~~	–	140	260
2nd place, silver medalist(s)	Jefferson Gómez	Venezuela	105	~~113~~	115	115	~~135~~	135	~~146~~	135	250
3rd place, bronze medalist(s)	Alexandro Liuzzi	Paraguay	95	100	102	102	118	120	125	125	227
4	Ramiro Palumbo	Argentina	95	99	~~101~~	101	119	~~124~~	~~124~~	119	218

=== Men's 65 kg ===
Rank	Athlete	Nation	Snatch (kg)				Clean & Jerk (kg)				Total
Rank	Athlete	Nation	1	2	3	Result	1	2	3	Result	Total
1st place, gold medalist(s)	Francisco Mosquera	Colombia	130	133	~~135~~	133	165	~~170~~	~~170~~	165	298
2nd place, silver medalist(s)	Luis Bardalez	Peru	130	~~134~~	~~134~~	130	~~163~~	163	166	166	296
3rd place, bronze medalist(s)	Thiago Silva	Brazil	123	128	~~131~~	128	162	~~166~~	–	162	290
4	Wilkeinner Lugo	Venezuela	127	131	~~134~~	131	158	~~164~~	~~165~~	158	289
5	Domingo Meza	Argentina	110	~~115~~	115	115	145	150	~~154~~	150	265
6	Francisco Sánchez	Paraguay	~~103~~	103	~~108~~	103	130	135	~~140~~	135	238

=== Men's 70 kg ===
Rank	Athlete	Nation	Snatch (kg)				Clean & Jerk (kg)				Total
Rank	Athlete	Nation	1	2	3	Result	1	2	3	Result	Total
1st place, gold medalist(s)	Luis Javier Mosquera	Colombia	140	145	~~150~~	145	170	178	~~182~~	178	323
2nd place, silver medalist(s)	Dionangel Vargas	Venezuela	125	135	138	138	156	~~165~~	165	165	303
3rd place, bronze medalist(s)	Miguel Ángel Preciado	Peru	110	116	120	120	145	155	–	155	275
4	Franklin Vélez	Bolivia	100	~~105~~	105	105	130	~~135~~	~~135~~	130	235

=== Men's 75 kg ===
Rank	Athlete	Nation	Snatch (kg)				Clean & Jerk (kg)				Total
Rank	Athlete	Nation	1	2	3	Result	1	2	3	Result	Total
1st place, gold medalist(s)	Julio Mayora	Venezuela	~~144~~	144	145	145	182	187	–	187	332
2nd place, silver medalist(s)	Jair Reyes	Ecuador	138	~~143~~	144	144	174	180	183	183	327
3rd place, bronze medalist(s)	Sergio Cares	Chile	130	~~136~~	137	137	160	~~168~~	~~168~~	160	297
4	Alejandro Duarte	Paraguay	105	110	115	115	130	135	~~140~~	135	250
5	Juan Martínez	Colombia	~~140~~	140	~~145~~	140	~~185~~	~~185~~	~~188~~	–	–

=== Men's 85 kg ===
Rank	Athlete	Nation	Snatch (kg)				Clean & Jerk (kg)				Total
Rank	Athlete	Nation	1	2	3	Result	1	2	3	Result	Total
1st place, gold medalist(s)	Ángel Rodríguez	Venezuela	160	~~161~~	164	164	186	190	203	203	367
2nd place, silver medalist(s)	Gustavo Maldonado	Colombia	152	157	161	161	~~185~~	~~185~~	185	185	346
3rd place, bronze medalist(s)	Neiser Grefa	Ecuador	145	150	153	153	183	190	~~194~~	190	343
4	Dante Pizzuti	Argentina	136	140	145	145	172	~~180~~	180	180	325
5	Santiago Villegas	Peru	125	130	~~135~~	130	160	166	~~170~~	166	296
6	Nicolas Pisano	Uruguay	118	123	126	126	148	154	160	160	286

=== Men's 95 kg ===
Rank	Athlete	Nation	Snatch (kg)				Clean & Jerk (kg)				Total
Rank	Athlete	Nation	1	2	3	Result	1	2	3	Result	Total
1st place, gold medalist(s)	Keydomar Vallenilla	Venezuela	165	~~169~~	169	169	203	214	-	214	383
2nd place, silver medalist(s)	Marcos Bonilla	Colombia	160	~~165~~	~~165~~	160	190	201	~~213~~	201	361
3rd place, bronze medalist(s)	Juan Guadamud	Ecuador	160	~~167~~	167	167	193	~~201~~	~~201~~	193	360
4	Alejo Jeremías Gómez	Argentina	136	140	143	143	173	181	189	189	332
5	Jorge Medina	Panama	~~135~~	137	142	142	~~158~~	160	166	166	308

=== Men's 110 kg ===
Rank	Athlete	Nation	Snatch (kg)				Clean & Jerk (kg)				Total
Rank	Athlete	Nation	1	2	3	Result	1	2	3	Result	Total
1st place, gold medalist(s)	Matheus Pessanha	Brazil	170	176	~~181~~	176	205	215	–	215	391
2nd place, silver medalist(s)	Mauricio Loaiza	Venezuela	163	~~170~~	171	171	195	210	~~215~~	210	381
3rd place, bronze medalist(s)	Nicolás Cuevas	Chile	144	148	152	152	181	187	190	190	342
4	Ismael Ovejero	Argentina	145	~~151~~	~~153~~	145	~~186~~	186	~~198~~	186	331
	Diego Velazco	Peru	~~145~~	145	~~150~~	145	~~190~~	~~190~~	~~190~~	–	–
	Jhonatan Rivas	Colombia	175	~~180~~	180	180	~~210~~	~~210~~	~~210~~	–	–

=== Men's +110 kg ===
Rank	Athlete	Nation	Snatch (kg)				Clean & Jerk (kg)				Total
Rank	Athlete	Nation	1	2	3	Result	1	2	3	Result	Total
1st place, gold medalist(s)	Rafael Cerro	Colombia	176	185	~~195~~	185	~~210~~	210	230	230	415
2nd place, silver medalist(s)	Gabriel Portela	Brazil	~~170~~	170	~~175~~	170	202	~~207~~	211	211	381
3rd place, bronze medalist(s)	Alonso Bizama	Chile	160	165	170	170	201	207	~~212~~	207	377
4	Hernán Viera	Peru	~~150~~	150	~~158~~	150	200	–	–	200	350
5	Luis Espinosa	Venezuela	145	150	~~155~~	150	185	~~191~~	–	185	335
6	Eduardo Noriega	Bolivia	~~138~~	138	145	145	165	~~180~~	~~180~~	165	310

=== Women's 49 kg ===
Rank	Athlete	Nation	Snatch (kg)				Clean & Jerk (kg)				Total
Rank	Athlete	Nation	1	2	3	Result	1	2	3	Result	Total
1st place, gold medalist(s)	Nayive Medina	Colombia	73	~~76~~	76	76	93	97	~~100~~	97	173
2nd place, silver medalist(s)	Macarena García	Chile	66	~~70~~	~~71~~	66	86	91	~~94~~	91	157
3rd place, bronze medalist(s)	Faviana Gavidia	Peru	62	~~65~~	65	65	80	85	~~88~~	85	150
	Mariangeli Martínez	Venezuela	~~73~~	73	~~77~~	73	~~97~~	~~97~~	~~97~~	–	73

=== Women's 53 kg ===
Rank	Athlete	Nation	Snatch (kg)				Clean & Jerk (kg)				Total
Rank	Athlete	Nation	1	2	3	Result	1	2	3	Result	Total
1st place, gold medalist(s)	Katherin Echandía	Venezuela	84	87	~~88~~	87	106	108	111	111	198
2nd place, silver medalist(s)	Rohelys Galvis	Colombia	84	~~87~~	~~88~~	84	100	106	~~109~~	106	190
3rd place, bronze medalist(s)	Natasha Rosa Figueiredo	Brazil	83	~~87~~	~~87~~	83	~~106~~	106	~~112~~	106	189
4	María Sol Moya	Argentina	70	74	77	77	86	91	95	95	172

=== Women's 57 kg ===
Rank	Athlete	Nation	Snatch (kg)				Clean & Jerk (kg)				Total
Rank	Athlete	Nation	1	2	3	Result	1	2	3	Result	Total
1st place, gold medalist(s)	Yilihannys Jiménez	Venezuela	87	~~89~~	~~89~~	87	106	109	112	112	199
2nd place, silver medalist(s)	Shoely Mego	Peru	81	85	~~88~~	85	104	109	112	112	190
3rd place, bronze medalist(s)	Antonina Moya	Colombia	85	~~88~~	~~88~~	85	103	106	110	110	195
4	Martina Mendoza	Argentina	80	83	~~86~~	83	~~100~~	~~100~~	100	100	183
5	Violeta Fernández	Paraguay	75	~~79~~	~~79~~	75	93	97	~~100~~	97	172

=== Women's 61 kg ===
Rank	Athlete	Nation	Snatch (kg)				Clean & Jerk (kg)				Total
Rank	Athlete	Nation	1	2	3	Result	1	2	3	Result	Total
1st place, gold medalist(s)	Karen Mosquera	Colombia	100	105	~~110~~	105	120	125	~~128~~	128	230
2nd place, silver medalist(s)	María Luz Casadevall	Argentina	94	97	~~100~~	97	116	126	128	128	225
3rd place, bronze medalist(s)	Nadia Vela	Peru	85	89	~~91~~	89	100	107	~~112~~	107	196
4	Génesis Rodríguez	Venezuela	~~98~~	~~98~~	~~98~~	–	–	–	–	–	–

=== Women's 69 kg ===
Rank	Athlete	Nation	Snatch (kg)				Clean & Jerk (kg)				Total
Rank	Athlete	Nation	1	2	3	Result	1	2	3	Result	Total
1st place, gold medalist(s)	Claudia Rengifo	Venezuela	104	107	110	110	127	130	133	133	243
2nd place, silver medalist(s)	Julieth Rodríguez	Colombia	108	~~112~~	~~112~~	108	128	133	~~136~~	133	241
3rd place, bronze medalist(s)	Bella Paredes	Ecuador	101	105	~~108~~	105	122	128	~~133~~	128	233
4	María Paz Casadevall	Argentina	90	93	96	96	116	120	124	124	220
5	Constanza Celis	Chile	92	96	~~98~~	96	110	~~115~~	~~115~~	120	206
6	Kelly Aparicio	Panama	80	83	~~85~~	83	101	105	~~108~~	105	188
7	Jheysi Paredes	Peru	~~79~~	79	~~83~~	79	102	107	~~110~~	107	186
8	Anali Capia	Bolivia	65	69	72	72	~~90~~	90	~~96~~	90	162

=== Women's 77 kg ===
Rank	Athlete	Nation	Snatch (kg)				Clean & Jerk (kg)				Total
Rank	Athlete	Nation	1	2	3	Result	1	2	3	Result	Total
1st place, gold medalist(s)	María Mena	Colombia	110	115	~~118~~	115	130	135	~~140~~	135	250
2nd place, silver medalist(s)	Angie Palacios	Ecuador	~~107~~	107	115	115	125	130	~~136~~	130	245
3rd place, bronze medalist(s)	Laura Amaro	Brazil	100	~~104~~	~~104~~	100	~~129~~	129	133	133	233
4	Keily Silva	Venezuela	100	~~105~~	105	105	123	~~129~~	~~129~~	123	228
5	María Emilia Sarraute	Uruguay	84	87	90	90	104	108	111	111	201
6	Ruth Alicia Copa	Bolivia	~~65~~	65	68	68	87	91	~~95~~	91	159
	Ariana Sernaque	Peru	~~83~~	~~83~~	~~83~~	–	–	–	–	–	–

=== Women's 86 kg ===
Rank	Athlete	Nation	Snatch (kg)				Clean & Jerk (kg)				Total
Rank	Athlete	Nation	1	2	3	Result	1	2	3	Result	Total
1st place, gold medalist(s)	Neisi Dájomes	Ecuador	~~110~~	110	~~120~~	110	138	143	~~148~~	143	253
2nd place, silver medalist(s)	Valeria Rivas	Colombia	108	112	~~115~~	112	135	140	~~143~~	140	252
3rd place, bronze medalist(s)	Lidysmar Aparicio	Venezuela	100	~~108~~	~~108~~	100	125	135	–	135	235
4	Camila Zamora	Peru	78	~~81~~	81	81	104	108	111	111	192

=== Women's +86 kg ===
Rank	Athlete	Nation	Snatch (kg)				Clean & Jerk (kg)				Total
Rank	Athlete	Nation	1	2	3	Result	1	2	3	Result	Total
1st place, gold medalist(s)	Naryury Pérez	Venezuela	116	119	121	121	145	149	~~153~~	149	270
2nd place, silver medalist(s)	Taiane Justino	Brazil	108	112	116	116	140	147	~~155~~	147	263
3rd place, bronze medalist(s)	Lisseth Ayoví	Ecuador	106	~~111~~	111	111	132	135	~~140~~	135	246
4	Yeinny Geles	Colombia	106	111	~~115~~	111	125	133	~~136~~	133	244
