= Weightlifting at the 2023 Pan American Games – Qualification =

The following is the qualification system and qualified nations for the weightlifting at the 2023 Pan American Games which will be held in Santiago, Chile.

== Qualification system ==
A total of 136 weightlifters (68 per gender) will qualify to compete at the games. A nation may enter a maximum of 8 weightlifters (four per gender). The host nation (Chile) automatically qualified the maximum team size. All other nations will qualify through their team scores from both the 2021 and 2022 Pan American Championships combined. A further two wild cards will be awarded (one per gender). Extra spots were granted to the winners of the respective categories at the 2021 Junior Pan American Games.

== Qualification timeline ==
Events	Date	Venue
2021 Pan American Weightlifting Championships	November 1–8, 2021	Guayaquil, Ecuador
2022 Pan American Weightlifting Championships	July 22–29, 2022	Bogotá, Colombia

== Qualification summary ==
A total of 27 NOC's qualified weightlifters. The quotas were distributed using the results of the qualification events and discussions with the NOC's.

NOC	Men	Women	Total athletes
Argentina	3	2	5
Aruba	0	1	1
Barbados	0	1	1
Bolivia	2	1	3
Brazil	3	3	6
Canada	3	3	6
Chile	4	4	8
Colombia	8	6	14
Costa Rica	2	2	4
Cuba	3	3	6
Dominican Republic	4	5	9
Ecuador	5	4	9
El Salvador	1	0	1
Guatemala	3	0	3
Guyana	1	0	1
Haiti	1	0	1
Honduras	1	2	3
Jamaica	0	1	1
Mexico	4	5	9
Nicaragua	2	2	4
Panama	1	1	2
Paraguay	2	2	4
Peru	2	3	5
Puerto Rico	3	3	6
United States	4	5	9
Uruguay	2	2	4
Venezuela	4	4	8
Total: 27 NOCs	68	68	136

== 2021 Junior Pan American Games ==
=== Men ===
Category	NOC	Name
61 kg	Colombia	Estiven Villar
73 kg	Colombia	Juan Martínez
89 kg	Ecuador	Iván Escudero
102 kg	Colombia	Yeison López Cuello
+102 kg	Colombia	Luis Quiñones
Total	5	

=== Women ===
Category	NOC	Name
49 kg	Dominican Republic	Dahiana Ortiz
59 kg	Colombia	Concepción Úsuga
71 kg	Colombia	Julieth Rodríguez
81 kg	United States	Olivia Reeves
+81 kg	Mexico	Abdeel Rodriguez
Total	5	

== Men's rankings ==
The following is the list of nations winning quotas for men's events.

- Host nation: 4 Athletes
- Teams 1st–6th: 4 Athletes
- Teams 7th–12th: 3 Athletes
- Teams 13th–18th: 2 Athletes
- Teams 19th–22nd: 1 Athlete
- Wild card: 1 athlete

Rank	Quota	NOC
–	4	Chile
1	4	Colombia
2	4	Mexico
3	4	Dominican Republic
4	4	Ecuador
5	4	Venezuela
6	4	United States
7	3	Guatemala
8	3	Puerto Rico
9	3	Canada
10	3	Brazil
11	3	Cuba
12	3	Argentina
13	2	Peru
14	2	Costa Rica
15	2	Uruguay
16	2	Nicaragua
17	2	Paraguay
18	2	Bolivia
19	1	Honduras
20	1	Panama
21	1	Haiti
22	1	El Salvador
WC	1	Guyana
	63	

== Women's rankings ==
The following is the list of nations winning quotas for women's events.

- Host nation: 4 Athletes
- Teams 1st–6th: 4 Athletes
- Teams 7th–12th: 3 Athletes
- Teams 13th–18th: 2 Athletes
- Teams 19th–22nd: 1 Athlete
- Wild card: 1 athlete

Rank	Quota	NOC
–	4	Chile
1	4	Colombia
2	4	United States
3	4	Mexico
4	4	Dominican Republic
5	4	Ecuador
6	4	Venezuela
7	3	Brazil
8	3	Canada
9	3	Peru
10	3	Puerto Rico
11	3	Guatemala
12	3	Cuba
13	2	Uruguay
14	2	Argentina
15	2	Nicaragua
16	2	Costa Rica
17	2	Paraguay
18	2	Honduras
19	1	Bolivia
20	1	Panama
21	1	Aruba
22	1	Barbados
WC	1	Jamaica
	63	
