= Úsuga (surname) =

Úsuga is a surname. Notable people with the surname include:

- Concepción Úsuga (born 2001), Colombian weightlifter
- Dario Antonio Úsuga (born 1971), Colombian drug lord
