= Jhohan =

Jhohan is a given name. Notable people with the given name include:

- Jhohan Romaña (born 1998), Colombian footballer
- Jhohan Sanguino (born 1998), Venezuelan weightlifter
