= Weightlifting at the 2023 Central American and Caribbean Games =

Weightlifting competition at the Central American and Caribbean Games

- Venue: Gimnasio Nacional José Adolfo Pineda
- Location: (El Salvador) San Salvador
- Dates: 24–27 June

The weightlifting competition at the 2023 Central American and Caribbean Games was held in San Salvador, El Salvador from 24 to 27 June at the Gimnasio Nacional José Adolfo Pineda.

== Medal table ==
* Host nation (El Salvador)

Rank	Nation	Gold	Silver	Bronze	Total
1	Colombia (COL)	19	5	2	26
2	Venezuela (VEN)	7	10	6	23
3	Dominican Republic (DOM)	3	3	10	16
4	Cuba (CUB)	2	3	6	11
5	Mexico (MEX)	1	9	4	14
6	Centro Caribe Sports (CCS)	0	2	0	2
7	Nicaragua (NCA)	0	0	2	2
7	Puerto Rico (PUR)	0	0	2	2
Totals (8 entries)		32	32	32	96

== Medal summary ==
=== Men's events ===
Event		Gold		Silver		Bronze	
55 kg	Snatch	Miguel Suárez (COL)	106 kg	Raibet Marchado (CUB)	105 kg	Howard Roche (PUR)	105 kg
55 kg	Clean & Jerk	Miguel Suárez (COL)	138 kg	Juan Barco (MEX)	137 kg	Winder Sánchez (VEN)	130 kg
61 kg	Snatch	Jairo García (COL)	126 kg	Wilkeinner Lugo (VEN)	125 kg	Arley Calderón (CUB)	124 kg
61 kg	Clean & Jerk	Arley Calderón (CUB)	155 kg	Wilkeinner Lugo (VEN)	151 kg	Jairo García (COL)	150 kg
67 kg	Snatch	Francisco Mosquera (COL)	137 kg	Reinner Arango (VEN)	134 kg	Orlando Vásquez (NCA)	131 kg
67 kg	Clean & Jerk	Francisco Mosquera (COL)	180 kg	Reinner Arango (VEN)	160 kg	Orlando Vásquez (NCA)	155 kg
73 kg	Snatch	Julio Mayora (VEN)	147 kg	Jorge Cárdenas (MEX)	146 kg	Julio Cedeño (DOM)	141 kg
73 kg	Clean & Jerk	Julio Mayora (VEN)	183 kg	Jorge Cárdenas (MEX)	172 kg	Julio Cedeño (DOM)	171 kg
81 kg	Snatch	Darvin Castro (VEN)	149 kg	Gustavo Maldonado (COL)	148 kg	Ray Reyes (DOM)	142 kg
81 kg	Clean & Jerk	Gustavo Maldonado (COL)	180 kg	Darvin Castro (VEN)	177 kg	Ray Reyes (DOM)	174 kg
96 kg	Snatch	Keydomar Vallenilla (VEN)	167 kg	Jhor Moreno (COL)	165 kg	Olfides Sáez (CUB)	155 kg
96 kg	Clean & Jerk	Keydomar Vallenilla (VEN)	210 kg	Jhor Moreno (COL)	206 kg	José López (MEX)	196 kg
109 kg	Snatch	Josué Medina (MEX)	168 kg	Jhohan Sanguino (VEN)	166 kg	Juan Columbié (CUB)	165 kg
109 kg	Clean & Jerk	Óscar Garcés (COL)	207 kg	Josué Medina (MEX)	204 kg	Juan Zaldívar (CUB)	204 kg
+109 kg	Snatch	Rafael Cerro (COL)	180 kg	Gilberto Lemus (CCS)	171 kg	Ezequiel Germán (DOM)	157 kg
+109 kg	Clean & Jerk	Rafael Cerro (COL)	205 kg	Gilberto Lemus (CCS)	204 kg	Ander Paniagua (DOM)	196 kg

=== Women's events ===
Event		Gold		Silver		Bronze	
49 kg	Snatch	Beatriz Pirón (DOM)	85 kg	Andrea de la Herrán (MEX)	85 kg	Dahiana Ortiz (DOM)	81 kg
49 kg	Clean & Jerk	Dahiana Ortiz (DOM)	105 kg	Yesica Hernández (MEX)	103 kg	Beatriz Pirón (DOM)	103 kg
55 kg	Snatch	Rosalba Morales (COL)	87 kg	Rosselyn Uzcátegui (VEN)	86 kg	Yailiana López (CUB)	83 kg
55 kg	Clean & Jerk	Rosalba Morales (COL)	110 kg	Rosselyn Uzcátegui (VEN)	107 kg	Yudheiky Panti (MEX)	106 kg
59 kg	Snatch	Yenny Álvarez (COL)	99 kg	Janeth Gómez (MEX)	98 kg	Génesis Rodríguez (VEN)	97 kg
59 kg	Clean & Jerk	Yenny Álvarez (COL)	130 kg GR	Janeth Gómez (MEX)	121 kg	Génesis Rodríguez (VEN)	120 kg
64 kg	Snatch	Julieth Rodríguez (COL)	103 kg	Natalia Llamosa (COL)	102 kg	Karla Ortiz (MEX)	98 kg
64 kg	Clean & Jerk	Natalia Llamosa (COL)	125 kg	Karla Ortiz (MEX)	124 kg	Julieth Rodríguez (COL)	121 kg
71 kg	Snatch	Mari Sánchez (COL)	108 kg	Yeniuska Mirabal (CUB)	95 kg	Kidaisha López (PUR)	94 kg
71 kg	Clean & Jerk	Mari Sánchez (COL)	130 kg	Yeniuska Mirabal (CUB)	122 kg	Fransheska Matías (DOM)	121 kg
76 kg	Snatch	Hellen Escobar (COL)	104 kg	Laura Peinado (VEN)	103 kg	Lizbeth Nolasco (MEX)	103 kg
76 kg	Clean & Jerk	Hellen Escobar (COL)	136 kg	Daiana Serrano (DOM)	125 kg	Laura Peinado (VEN)	121 kg
87 kg	Snatch	Yudelina Mejía (DOM)	115 kg	Yeinny Geles (COL)	105 kg	Dayana Chirinos (VEN)	104 kg
87 kg	Clean & Jerk	Dayana Chirinos (VEN)	140 kg	Yudelina Mejía (DOM)	139 kg	Elizabeth Reyes (CUB)	135 kg
+87 kg	Snatch	Naryury Pérez (VEN)	117 kg	Crismery Santana (DOM)	116 kg	Yaniuska Espinosa (VEN)	113 kg
+87 kg	Clean & Jerk	Marifélix Sarría (CUB)	152 kg	Naryury Pérez (VEN)	149 kg	Crismery Santana (DOM)	144 kg
