= Weightlifting at the 2022 Bolivarian Games =

- Venue: Polideportivo Colegio Andrés Escobar Court
- Location: Valledupar, Colombia
- Dates: 1-5 July 2022
- Competitors: 86 from 9 nations

The weightlifting competitions at the 2022 Bolivarian Games took place in the Polideportivo Colegio Andrés Escobar Court in Valledupar, Colombia from 1 to 5 July 2022.

== Participating nations ==
- Bolivia
- Chile
- Colombia (host)
- Dominican Republic
- Ecuador
- Panama
- Paraguay
- Peru
- Venezuela

== Medal table ==
* Host nation (Colombia)

Rank	Nation	Gold	Silver	Bronze	Total
1	Colombia (COL)*	22	15	3	40
2	Ecuador (ECU)	9	11	7	27
3	Venezuela (VEN)	9	10	11	30
4	Dominican Republic (DOM)	0	2	7	9
4	Peru (PER)	0	2	7	9
6	Chile (CHI)	0	0	3	3
7	Panama (PAN)	0	0	2	2
Totals (7 entries)		40	40	40	120

== Medalists ==
Men

Event	Gold	Silver	Bronze
55 kg snatch	Miguel Suárez; Colombia	Jhony Arteaga; Ecuador	Abraham Rivera; Venezuela
55 kg clean & jerk	Miguel Suárez; Colombia	Abraham Rivera; Venezuela	Jhony Arteaga; Ecuador
61 kg snatch	Habib de las Salas; Colombia	Victor Garrido; Ecuador	Estiven Villar; Colombia
61 kg clean & jerk	Habib de las Salas; Colombia	Estiven Villar; Colombia	Victor Garrido; Ecuador
67 kg snatch	Francisco Mosquera; Colombia	Jair Reyes; Ecuador	Reinner Arango; Venezuela
67 kg clean & jerk	Francisco Mosquera; Colombia	Jair Reyes; Ecuador	Luis Bardalez; Peru
73 kg snatch	Julio Mayora; Venezuela	Luis Javier Mosquera; Colombia	Sergio Cares; Chile
73 kg clean & jerk	Julio Mayora; Venezuela	Luis Javier Mosquera; Colombia	Francisco Tonton; Dominican Republic
81 kg snatch	Darvin Castro; Venezuela	Gustavo Maldonado; Colombia	Yendri Benitez; Dominican Republic
81 kg clean & jerk	Darvin Castro; Venezuela	Gustavo Maldonado; Colombia	Yendri Benitez; Dominican Republic
89 kg snatch	Brayan Rodallegas; Colombia	Iván Escudero; Ecuador	Nerwis Maneiro; Venezuela
89 kg clean & jerk	Brayan Rodallegas; Colombia	Iván Escudero; Ecuador	Nerwis Maneiro; Venezuela
96 kg snatch	Jhor Moreno; Colombia	Keydomar Vallenilla; Venezuela	Amel Atencia; Peru
96 kg clean & jerk	Keydomar Vallenilla; Venezuela	Jhor Moreno; Colombia	Amel Atencia; Peru
102 kg snatch	Yeimar Mendoza; Colombia	Wilmer Contreras; Ecuador	Pedro Diaz; Venezuela
102 kg clean & jerk	Yeimar Mendoza; Colombia	Pedro Diaz; Venezuela	Wilmer Contreras; Ecuador
109 kg snatch	Andrés Serna; Colombia	Jhohan Sanguino; Venezuela	Confesor Santana; Dominican Republic
109 kg clean & jerk	Andrés Serna; Colombia	Jhohan Sanguino; Venezuela	Confesor Santana; Dominican Republic
+109 kg snatch	Dixon Arroyo; Ecuador	Hernán Viera; Peru	Alonso Bizama; Chile
+109 kg clean & jerk	Dixon Arroyo; Ecuador	Hernán Viera; Peru	Alonso Bizama; Chile

Women

Event	Gold	Silver	Bronze
45 kg snatch	Manuela Berrío; Colombia	Rosielis Quintana; Venezuela	Kerlys Montilla; Venezuela
45 kg clean & jerk	Manuela Berrío; Colombia	Rosielis Quintana; Venezuela	Kerlys Montilla; Venezuela
49 kg snatch	Katherin Echandía; Venezuela	Candida Vásquez; Dominican Republic	Anali Saldarriaga; Peru
49 kg clean & jerk	Katherin Echandía; Venezuela	Candida Vásquez; Dominican Republic	Anali Saldarriaga; Peru
55 kg snatch	Génesis Rodríguez; Venezuela	Jennifer Hernández; Ecuador	Shoely Mego; Peru
55 kg clean & jerk	Génesis Rodríguez; Venezuela	Jennifer Hernández; Ecuador	Shoely Mego; Peru
59 kg snatch	Yenny Álvarez; Colombia	Concepción Úsuga; Colombia	Jenifer Becerra; Ecuador
59 kg clean & jerk	Yenny Álvarez; Colombia	Concepción Úsuga; Colombia	Jenifer Becerra; Ecuador
64 kg snatch	Natalia Llamosa; Colombia	Julieth Rodríguez; Colombia	Kareen Fernandez; Venezuela
64 kg clean & jerk	Julieth Rodríguez; Colombia	Natalia Llamosa; Colombia	Alexandra Escobar; Ecuador
71 kg snatch	Angie Palacios; Ecuador	Mari Sánchez; Colombia	Miyareth Mendoza; Colombia
71 kg clean & jerk	Mari Sánchez; Colombia	Miyareth Mendoza; Colombia	Angie Palacios; Ecuador
76 kg snatch	Mailyng Echeverría; Colombia	Bella Paredes; Ecuador	Laura Peinado; Venezuela
76 kg clean & jerk	Mailyng Echeverría; Colombia	Bella Paredes; Ecuador	Laura Peinado; Venezuela
81 kg snatch	Neisi Dájomes; Ecuador	Valeria Rivas; Colombia	Veronica Vega; Dominican Republic
81 kg clean & jerk	Neisi Dájomes; Ecuador	Valeria Rivas; Colombia	Veronica Vega; Dominican Republic
87 kg snatch	Tamara Salazar; Ecuador	Yeinny Geles; Colombia	Dayana Chirinos; Venezuela
87 kg clean & jerk	Tamara Salazar; Ecuador	Dayana Chirinos; Venezuela	Yeinny Geles; Colombia
+87 kg snatch	Lisseth Ayoví; Ecuador	Yaniuska Espinosa; Venezuela	Mariadni Batista; Panama
+87 kg clean & jerk	Lisseth Ayoví; Ecuador	Yaniuska Espinosa; Venezuela	Mariadni Batista; Panama
