= Luis Bardalez =

Peruvian weightlifter (born 1995)

Personal information
- Full name: Luis David Bardalez Tuisima
- Born: 3 October 1995 (age 31)

Sport
- Country: Peru
- Sport: Weightlifting
- Weight class: 61 kg; 65 kg; 67 kg
Medal record
Men's weightlifting
Representing Peru
Pan American Games
Bronze medal – third place	2019 Lima	67 kg
Bronze medal – third place	2023 Santiago	61 kg
Pan American Championships
Silver medal – second place	2024 Caracas	61 kg
Bronze medal – third place	2022 Bogotá	67 kg
Bronze medal – third place	2023 Bariloche	61 kg
Bronze medal – third place	2025 Cali	65 kg
South American Games
Silver medal – second place	2026 Santa Fe	65 kg
Bolivarian Games
Gold medal – first place	2025 Lima-Ayacucho	65 kg CJ
Bronze medal – third place	2022 Valledupar	67 kg CJ
Bronze medal – third place	2024 Ayacucho	67 kg
Bronze medal – third place	2025 Lima-Ayacucho	65 kg S

Luis David Bardalez Tuisima (born 3 October 1995) is a Peruvian weightlifter. He won a bronze medal at the 2019 Pan American Games in Lima, Peru and at the 2023 Pan American Games in Santiago, Chile. He is a four-time medalist at the Pan American Weightlifting Championships.

== Career ==
Bardalez competed in the men's 67 kg event at the 2018 World Weightlifting Championships held in Ashgabat, Turkmenistan. In 2019, he won the bronze medal in the men's 67 kg Clean & Jerk event at the Pan American Weightlifting Championships held in Guatemala City, Guatemala. In that same year, he competed in the men's 67 kg at the World Weightlifting Championships held in Pattaya, Thailand.

Bardalez won the bronze medal in the men's 67 kg Clean & Jerk event at the 2021 Pan American Weightlifting Championships held in Guayaquil, Ecuador. He won the bronze medal in the men's 67 kg Clean & Jerk event at the 2022 Bolivarian Games held in Valledupar, Colombia. He won the bronze medal in his event at the 2022 Pan American Weightlifting Championships held in Bogotá, Colombia.

He competed in the men's 67 kg event at the 2022 South American Games held in Asunción, Paraguay. He competed in the men's 61 kg event at the 2022 World Weightlifting Championships held in Bogotá, Colombia. Bardalez won the bronze medal in the men's 61 kg event at the 2023 Pan American Weightlifting Championships held in Bariloche, Argentina. Bardalez also won the bronze medal in the men's 61 kg event at the 2023 Pan American Games held in Santiago, Chile.

In 2024, he won the silver medal in the men's 61 kg event at the Pan American Weightlifting Championships held in Caracas, Venezuela.

== Achievements ==
Year	Venue	Weight	Snatch (kg)				Clean & Jerk (kg)				Total	Rank
Year	Venue	Weight	1	2	3	Rank	1	2	3	Rank	Total	Rank
World Championships
2018	Ashgabat, Turkmenistan	67 kg	120	123	125	23	155	~~158~~	~~160~~	19	280	20
2019	Pattaya, Thailand	67 kg	123	~~127~~	~~127~~	31	160	163	166	16	289	25
2025	Førde, Norway	65 kg	127	131	134	7	165	~~168~~	~~168~~	7	299	8
2026	Ningbo, China	65 kg	130	~~134~~	~~134~~	17	~~162~~	~~162~~	~~165~~	__	DNF	__
Pan American Games
2019	Lima, Peru	67 kg	123	127	~~129~~	—N/a	160	164	~~167~~	—N/a	291	3rd place, bronze medalist(s)
2023	Santiago, Chile	61 kg	119	122	124	—N/a	~~151~~	151	~~153~~	—N/a	275	3rd place, bronze medalist(s)
Pan American Championships
2017	Miami, United States	69 kg	121	125	127	8	155	~~160~~	161	8	288	7
2019	Guatemala City, Guatemala	67 kg	122	126	128	4	158	161	~~164~~	3rd place, bronze medalist(s)	289	4
2020	Santo Domingo, Dominican Republic	67 kg	128	131	133	5	~~165~~	165	~~169~~	5	298	5
2021	Guayaquil, Ecuador	67 kg	127	130	132	4	165	168	~~170~~	3rd place, bronze medalist(s)	300	4
2022	Bogotá, Colombia	67 kg	126	130	~~134~~	3rd place, bronze medalist(s)	161	~~166~~	169	3rd place, bronze medalist(s)	299	3rd place, bronze medalist(s)
2023	Bariloche, Argentina	61 kg	117	~~121~~	121	4	150	~~154~~	~~155~~	4	271	3rd place, bronze medalist(s)
South American Games
2018	Cochabamba, Bolivia	69 kg	~~121~~	121	124	3rd place, bronze medalist(s)	153	156	159	5	283	4
2022	Asunción, Paraguay	67 kg	~~126~~	128	~~131~~	—N/a	166	~~170~~	~~170~~	—N/a	294	4
Bolivarian Games
2022	Valledupar, Colombia	67 kg	127	~~131~~	~~131~~	4	160	162	165	3rd place, bronze medalist(s)	—N/a	—N/a
