= Jorge Cárdenas (weightlifter) =

Mexican weightlifter (born 1997)

Personal information
- Full name: Jorge Adán Cárdenas Estrada
- Born: 21 April 1997 (age 29) Culiacán, Sinaloa, Mexico
- Height: 5 ft 6 in (168 cm)
- Weight: 71 kg (157 lb; 11 st 3 lb)

Sport
- Sport: Weightlifting
Medal record
Men's weightlifting
Representing Mexico
Pan American Games
Bronze medal – third place	2023 Santiago	73 kg
Central American and Caribbean Games
Silver medal – second place	2023 San Salvador	73 kg S
Silver medal – second place	2023 San Salvador	73 kg CJ
Gold medal – first place	2026 Santo Domingo	71 kg S
Silver medal – second place	2026 Santo Domingo	71 kg CJ
Pan American Weightlifting Championships
Silver medal – second place	2022 Bogotá	73 kg
Bronze medal – third place	2023 Bariloche	73 kg
Bronze medal – third place	2024 Caracas	73 kg

Jorge Adán Cárdenas Estrada (born 21 April 1997), commonly known as El Chino, is a Mexican weightlifter. He represented Mexico at the 2020 Summer Olympics in Tokyo, where he placed 11th in the men's 73 kg category, and won a bronze medal in the same category at the 2023 Pan American Games in Santiago. At the 2026 Central American and Caribbean Games in Santo Domingo, he won gold in the men's 71 kg snatch and silver in the clean and jerk.

== Early life ==
Cárdenas was born in Culiacán, Sinaloa. He studied at the Language Studies Center of the Autonomous University of Sinaloa, where he trained under coach Jorge Huie Molinet. He represented the university at the Universiada Nacional and subsequently became a member of the Mexican national team.

== Career ==
In 2018, he secured a snatch bronze medal in the 69 kg class at the Pan American Weightlifting Championship in Santo Domingo and placed 23rd in the 73 kg class at the World Weightlifting Championships in Ashgabat. In 2019, he finished 4th with a 310 kg total at the Pan American Games in Lima, won multiple silver and bronze medals at the South American and Ibero-American Open in Cali, and competed at the Central American and Caribbean Games in Barranquilla.

=== 2020 Summer Olympics ===
Cárdenas qualified for the delayed 2020 Summer Olympics in Tokyo, competing in the men's 73 kg division. Lifting in Group B, he registered a 145 kg snatch and a 175 kg clean and jerk for a 320 kg total, placing 11th overall.

=== Post-Olympic career ===
Following the Tokyo Olympics, Cárdenas won medals at three consecutive Pan American Weightlifting Championships in the 73 kg category. At the 2022 event in Bogotá, he won the gold medal in the snatch (145 kg) and a silver in the clean and jerk (170 kg), before securing the overall total silver medal. This was followed by consecutive overall bronze medals, finishing with a 310 kg total at the 2023 event in Bariloche and a 300 kg total at the 2024 event in Caracas. He also claimed a bronze medal at the 2023 Pan American Games in Santiago, where he recorded a total lift of 317 kg (147 kg in snatch and 170 kg in clean and jerk).

At the 2026 Central American and Caribbean Games in Santo Domingo, he won a gold medal in the men's 71 kg snatch (150 kg) and a silver medal in the clean and jerk (167 kg).
