= Letícia Moraes =

Brazilian weightlifter

Personal information
- Full name: Letícia Cristina Laurindo Moraes

Sport
- Country: Brazil
- Sport: Weightlifting
- Weight class: 55 kg
Medal record
Women's weightlifting
Representing Brazil
Pan American Championships
Bronze medal – third place	2022 Bogotá	55 kg
South American Games
Bronze medal – third place	2022 Asunción	55 kg

Letícia Cristina Laurindo Moraes is a Brazilian weightlifter. She won the bronze medal in women's 55 kg event at the 2022 South American Games held in Asunción, Paraguay.

She won the bronze medal in her event at the 2022 Pan American Weightlifting Championships held in Bogotá, Colombia.
