= Mari Sánchez =

Colombian weightlifter (born 1991)

Personal information
- Full name: Mari Leivis Sánchez Periñán
- Born: 8 October 1991 (age 34) Turbo, Colombia

Sport
- Country: Colombia
- Sport: Weightlifting
- Weight class: 69 kg; 71 kg; 76 kg; 77 kg

Achievements and titles
- Personal bests: Snatch: 112 kg (2025); Clean & jerk: 140 kg (2026); Total: 248 kg (2025)
Medal record
Representing Colombia
Women's weightlifting
Big (Total)
Event	1st	2nd	3rd
Olympic Games	0	1	0
World Championships	0	0	1
Pan American Games	0	1	0
Pan American Championships	0	4	0
South American Games	0	1	0
Total	0	7	1
Big and small medals
Event	1st	2nd	3rd
Olympic Games	0	1	0
World Championships	0	0	2
Pan American Games	0	1	0
Pan American Championships	3	9	1
CAC Games	5	0	1
South American Games	0	1	0
Bolivarian Games	3	1	0
Total	11	13	4
Olympic Games
Silver medal – second place	2024 Paris	71 kg
World Championships
Bronze medal – third place	2025 Førde	77 kg
Pan American Games
Silver medal – second place	2023 Santiago	71 kg
Pan American Championships
Silver medal – second place	2020 Santo Domingo	71 kg
Silver medal – second place	2022 Bogotá	71 kg
Silver medal – second place	2024 Caracas	71 kg
Silver medal – second place	2025 Cali	77 kg
Central American and Caribbean Games
Gold medal – first place	2018 Barranquilla	69 kg S
Gold medal – first place	2023 San Salvador	71 kg S
Gold medal – first place	2023 San Salvador	71 kg CJ
Gold medal – first place	2026 Santo Domingo	77 kg S
Gold medal – first place	2026 Santo Domingo	77 kg CJ
Bronze medal – third place	2018 Barranquilla	69 kg CJ
South American Games
Silver medal – second place	2022 Asunción	76 kg
Bolivarian Games
Gold medal – first place	2022 Valledupar	71 kg CJ
Gold medal – first place	2025 Lima-Ayacucho	77 kg S
Gold medal – first place	2025 Lima-Ayacucho	77 kg CJ
Silver medal – second place	2022 Valledupar	71 kg S

Mari Leivis Sánchez Periñán (born 8 October 1991) is a Colombian weightlifter. She won the silver medal in the women's 71 kg event at the 2024 Summer Olympics in Paris, France. She is a four-time silver medalist at the Pan American Weightlifting Championships. She won two medals, including gold, at the 2022 Bolivarian Games held in Valledupar, Colombia.

== Career ==
Sánchez won the gold medal in the women's 69 kg Snatch event at the 2018 Central American and Caribbean Games held in Barranquilla, Colombia. She also won the silver medal in the women's 69 kg Clean & Jerk event. In that same year, she competed in the women's 71 kg event at the World Weightlifting Championships held in Ashgabat, Turkmenistan.

Sánchez won the silver medal in her event at the 2020 Pan American Weightlifting Championships held in Santo Domingo, Dominican Republic. She also won the silver medal in her event at the 2022 Pan American Weightlifting Championships held in Bogotá, Colombia.

Sánchez won two medals, including gold, at the 2022 Bolivarian Games held in Valledupar, Colombia. She won the silver medal in the women's 76 kg event at the 2022 South American Games held in Asunción, Paraguay.

Sánchez won the silver medal in the women's 71 kg event at the 2023 Pan American Games held in Santiago, Chile. In February 2024, she won the silver medal in her event at the Pan American Weightlifting Championships held in Caracas, Venezuela.

In August 2024, Sánchez won the silver medal in the women's 71 kg event at the 2024 Summer Olympics held in Paris, France.

== Achievements ==
Year	Venue	Weight	Snatch (kg)				Clean & Jerk (kg)				Total	Rank
Year	Venue	Weight	1	2	3	Rank	1	2	3	Rank	Total	Rank
Representing Colombia
Olympic Games
2024	Paris, France	71 kg	108	~~112~~	112	4	135	140	145	2	257	2nd place, silver medalist(s)
World Championships
2018	Ashgabat, Turkmenistan	71 kg	103	~~106~~	~~107~~	6	120	~~125~~	125	8	228	7
2022	Bogotá, Colombia	71 kg	108	111	~~113~~	4	133	~~136~~	~~137~~	7	244	6
2023	Riyadh, Saudi Arabia	71 kg	105	108	~~111~~	5	128	132	~~135~~	7	240	7
2024	Manama, Bahrain	71 kg	103	106	~~110~~	6	130	~~135~~	~~135~~	7	236	6
2025	Førde, Norway	77 kg	106	110	112	3rd place, bronze medalist(s)	132	~~136~~	136	5	248	3rd place, bronze medalist(s)
IWF World Cup
2024	Phuket, Thailand	71 kg	~~104~~	104	110	6	130	~~135~~	~~135~~	13	240	7
Pan American Games
2023	Santiago, Chile	71 kg	105	109	112	—N/a	130	134	~~137~~	—N/a	246	2nd place, silver medalist(s)
Pan American Championships
2014	Santo Domingo, Dominican Republic	63 kg	~~93~~	93	96	4	110	~~115~~	115	4	211	4
2020	Santo Domingo, Dominican Republic	71 kg	102	~~105~~	105	1st place, gold medalist(s)	123	126	~~129~~	3rd place, bronze medalist(s)	231	2nd place, silver medalist(s)
2021	Guayaquil, Ecuador	71 kg	103	~~106~~	106	2nd place, silver medalist(s)	~~123~~	123	~~129~~	5	229	5
2022	Bogotá, Colombia	71 kg	105	110	112	2nd place, silver medalist(s)	130	134	~~136~~	1st place, gold medalist(s)	246	2nd place, silver medalist(s)
2024	Caracas, Venezuela	71 kg	~~90~~	101	104	4	120	125	128	2nd place, silver medalist(s)	232	2nd place, silver medalist(s)
2025	Cali, Colombia	77 kg	105	109	111	1st place, gold medalist(s)	130	134	137	2nd place, silver medalist(s)	248	2nd place, silver medalist(s)
2026	Panama City, Panama	77 kg	105	~~110~~	~~111~~	5	130	138	~~142~~	2nd place, silver medalist(s)	243	4
Central American and Caribbean Games
2018	Barranquilla, Colombia	69 kg	103	108	~~111~~	1st place, gold medalist(s)	124	128	~~130~~	3rd place, bronze medalist(s)	—N/a	—N/a
2023	San Salvador, El Salvador	71 kg	100	105	108	1st place, gold medalist(s)	125	~~130~~	130	1st place, gold medalist(s)	—N/a	—N/a
2026	Santo Domingo, Dominican Republic	77 kg	~~107~~	108	112	1st place, gold medalist(s)	135	140	~~143~~	1st place, gold medalist(s)	—N/a	—N/a
South American Games
2022	Asunción, Paraguay	76 kg	105	110	~~112~~	—N/a	130	~~134~~	~~138~~	—N/a	240	2nd place, silver medalist(s)
Bolivarian Games
2022	Valledupar, Colombia	71 kg	105	108	111	2nd place, silver medalist(s)	129	131	135	1st place, gold medalist(s)	—N/a	—N/a
2025	Lima, Peru	77 kg	102	105	—	1st place, gold medalist(s)	128	—	—	1st place, gold medalist(s)	—N/a	—N/a
