= Concepción Úsuga =

Colombian weightlifter (born 2001)

Personal information
- Full name: Concepción Úsuga Correra
- Born: 7 February 2001 (age 25)

Sport
- Country: Colombia
- Sport: Weightlifting
- Weight class: 58 kg; 59 kg; 64 kg
Medal record
Representing Colombia
Women's weightlifting
Pan American Championships
Silver medal – second place	2022 Bogotá	59 kg
Bolivarian Games
Silver medal – second place	2022 Valledupar	59 kg S
Silver medal – second place	2022 Valledupar	59 kg CJ
Junior Pan American Games
Gold medal – first place	2021 Cali-Valle	59 kg

Concepción Úsuga Correra (born 7 February 2001) is a Colombian weightlifter. She won the silver medal in the women's 59 kg event at the 2022 Pan American Weightlifting Championships held in Bogotá, Colombia. She won two silver medals at the 2022 Bolivarian Games held in Valledupar, Colombia.

She won the gold medal in the women's 59 kg event at the 2021 Junior Pan American Games held in Cali and Valle, Colombia.

She competed in the women's 59 kg event at the 2022 World Weightlifting Championships held in Bogotá, Colombia. She also competed in the women's 59 kg event at the 2023 Pan American Games held in Santiago, Chile.

== Achievements ==
Year	Venue	Weight	Snatch (kg)				Clean & Jerk (kg)				Total	Rank
Year	Venue	Weight	1	2	3	Rank	1	2	3	Rank	Total	Rank
Representing Colombia
World Championships
2022	Bogotá, Colombia	59 kg	~~95~~	95	~~100~~	13	117	122	~~125~~	7	217	8
2024	Manama, Bahrain	64 kg	100	~~104~~	106	4	122	127	~~131~~	6	233	5
Pan American Games
2023	Santiago, Chile	59 kg	92	96	99	—N/a	110	115	120	—N/a	219	5
Pan American Championships
2022	Bogotá, Colombia	59 kg	93	95	98	2nd place, silver medalist(s)	115	118	~~123~~	3rd place, bronze medalist(s)	216	2nd place, silver medalist(s)
2024	Caracas, Venezuela	59 kg	90	94	98	4	110	~~115~~	~~118~~	5	208	5
2025	Cali, Colombia	58 kg	90	~~95~~	95	5	110	115	~~119~~	4	210	4
Bolivarian Games
2022	Valledupar, Colombia	59 kg	~~90~~	90	96	2nd place, silver medalist(s)	113	118	~~122~~	2nd place, silver medalist(s)	—N/a	—N/a
Junior Pan American Games
2021	Cali, Colombia	59 kg	90	94	96 JAM	1	110	117	~~121~~	1	213 JAM	1st place, gold medalist(s)
