= Lisseth Ayoví =

Ecuadorian weightlifter (born 1998)

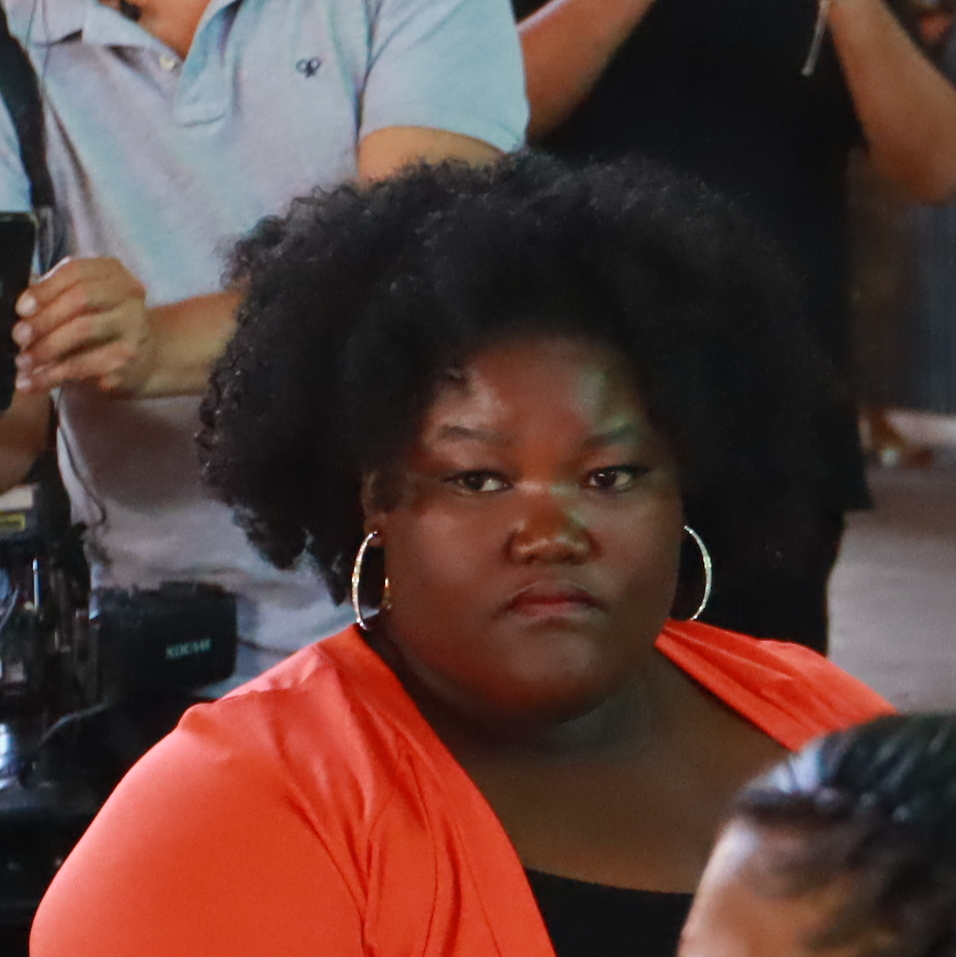
- in 2024

Personal information
- Full name: Lisseth Betzaida Ayoví Cabezas
- Nickname: Monchita
- Born: 7 August 1998 (age 28) El Oro Province, Ecuador
- Home town: Machala, Ecuador

Sport
- Country: Ecuador
- Sport: Weightlifting
- Weight class: +87 kg
- Club: Fedeoro
- Coached by: Hugo Quelal, Yofre Bustamante
Medal record
Women's weightlifting
Representing Ecuador
World Championships
Bronze medal – third place	2023 Riyadh	+87 kg
Pan American Games
Silver medal – second place	2023 Santiago	+81 kg
Bronze medal – third place	2019 Lima	+87 kg
Pan American Championships
Gold medal – first place	2024 Caracas	+87 kg
Gold medal – first place	2026 Panama City	+86 kg
Silver medal – second place	2021 Guayaquil	+87 kg
Silver medal – second place	2022 Bogotá	+87 kg
Bronze medal – third place	2019 Guatemala City	+87 kg
Bronze medal – third place	2020 Santo Domingo	+87 kg
South American Games
Gold medal – first place	2022 Asunción	+87 kg
Bronze medal – third place	2026 Santa Fe	+86 kg
Bolivarian Games
Gold medal – first place	2022 Valledupar	+87 kg S
Gold medal – first place	2022 Valledupar	+87 kg CJ

Lisseth Betzaida Ayoví Cabezas (born 7 August 1998, Machala) is an Ecuadorian weightlifter. She won the bronze medal in the women's +87 kg event at the 2023 World Weightlifting Championships held in Riyadh, Saudi Arabia.

== Career ==
Ayoví competed in the girls' +63 kg event at the 2014 Summer Youth Olympics held in Nanjing, China.

In 2019, she won the bronze medal in the Clean & Jerk in her event at the Pan American Weightlifting Championships held in Guatemala City, Guatemala. After the competition the Mexican Tania Mascorro was banned for using Boldenone, so Ayoví won another two bronze medals (snatch and total).

She also won the bronze medal in the women's +87 kg event at the 2019 Pan American Games held in Lima, Peru.

In 2021, Ayoví won the bronze medal in the women's +87 kg event at the 2020 Pan American Weightlifting Championships held in Santo Domingo, Dominican Republic.

Ayoví won two gold medals at the 2022 Bolivarian Games held in Valledupar, Colombia. She won the silver medal in the women's +87 kg event at the 2022 Pan American Weightlifting Championships held in Bogotá, Colombia. She also won the silver medal in the Clean & Jerk event in this competition.

Ayoví won the gold medal in her event at the 2022 South American Games held in Asunción, Paraguay. She won the silver medal in the women's +81 kg event at the 2023 Pan American Games held in Santiago, Chile.

In February 2024, she won the gold medal in the women's +87 kg event at the Pan American Weightlifting Championships held in Caracas, Venezuela.

In August 2024, Ayoví finished in 4th place in the women's +81 kg event at the 2024 Summer Olympics held in Paris, France.

== Achievements ==
Year	Venue	Weight	Snatch (kg)				Clean & Jerk (kg)				Total	Rank
Year	Venue	Weight	1	2	3	Rank	1	2	3	Rank	Total	Rank
Summer Olympics
2024	Paris, France	+81 kg	117	121	123	—N/a	156	160	~~162~~	—N/a	283	4
World Championships
2015	Houston, United States	+75 kg	102	106	108	22	133	136	~~140~~	21	244	22
2017	Anaheim, United States	+90 kg	107	111	~~113~~	6	135	140	~~143~~	6	251	6
2018	Ashgabat, Turkmenistan	+87 kg	110	~~115~~	116	10	140	~~145~~	~~145~~	14	256	11
2019	Pattaya, Thailand	+87 kg	112	116	~~118~~	11	136	138	142	15	258	13
2021	Tashkent, Uzbekistan	+87 kg	110	~~116~~	~~116~~	8	130	136	140	7	250	7
2022	Bogotá, Colombia	+87 kg	110	115	120	7	145	151	155	6	275	7
2023	Riyadh, Saudi Arabia	+87 kg	111	116	121	3rd place, bronze medalist(s)	146	150	155	3rd place, bronze medalist(s)	276	3rd place, bronze medalist(s)
Pan American Games
2019	Lima, Peru	+87 kg	108	115	~~120~~	—N/a	130	135	140	—N/a	255	3rd place, bronze medalist(s)
2023	Santiago, Chile	+81 kg	111	116	119	—N/a	147	152	157	—N/a	276	2nd place, silver medalist(s)
Pan American Championships
2014	Santo Domingo, Dominican Republic	+75 kg	95	101	~~106~~	5	120	125	~~130~~	7	226	6
2017	Miami, United States	+90 kg	103	108	112	4	128	135	140	4	252	4
2018	Santo Domingo, Dominican Republic	+90 kg	100	107	~~112~~	5	~~130~~	130	136	5	243	5
2019	Guatemala City, Guatemala	+87 kg	110	115	118	3rd place, bronze medalist(s)	141	~~146~~	146	3rd place, bronze medalist(s)	264	3rd place, bronze medalist(s)
2020	Santo Domingo, Dominican Republic	+87 kg	110	115	~~117~~	3rd place, bronze medalist(s)	138	143	145	3rd place, bronze medalist(s)	260	3rd place, bronze medalist(s)
2021	Guayaquil, Ecuador	+87 kg	100	106	113	2nd place, silver medalist(s)	126	130	—	2nd place, silver medalist(s)	243	2nd place, silver medalist(s)
2022	Bogotá, Colombia	+87 kg	106	110	115	4	137	141	149	2nd place, silver medalist(s)	264	2nd place, silver medalist(s)
2023	Bariloche, Argentina	+87 kg	~~112~~	~~112~~	~~112~~	—	141	146	153	2nd place, silver medalist(s)	—	—
2024	Caracas, Venezuela	+87 kg	112	116	118	1st place, gold medalist(s)	146	151	~~158~~	1st place, gold medalist(s)	269	1st place, gold medalist(s)
South American Championships
2013	Chiclayo, Peru	+75 kg	85	90	95	5	110	115	120	4	210	4
2017	Santa Marta, Colombia	+90 kg	105	111	~~115~~	2nd place, silver medalist(s)	133	140	~~144~~	2nd place, silver medalist(s)	251	2nd place, silver medalist(s)
2019	Palmira, Colombia	+87 kg	105	110	117	1st place, gold medalist(s)	137	141	145	1st place, gold medalist(s)	262	1st place, gold medalist(s)
Ibero-American Championships
2019	Palmira, Colombia	+87 kg	105	110	117	2nd place, silver medalist(s)	137	141	145	1st place, gold medalist(s)	262	1st place, gold medalist(s)
