= Weightlifting at the 2022 South American Games =

Weightlifting competitions at the 2022 South American Games

- Venue: Pavilion 1 of SND
- Dates: October 2−5
- Nations: 13

Weightlifting competitions at the 2022 South American Games in Asunción, Paraguay were held between October 2 and 5, 2022 at the Pavilion 1 of SND

== Schedule ==
The competition schedule is as follows:

Men
Date Event	Sun 2	Mon 3	Tue 4	Wed 5
Men's 61 kg	F			
Men's 67 kg	F			
Men's 73 kg	F			
Men's 81 kg		F		
Men's 96 kg			F	
Men's 109 kg				F
Men's +109 kg				F

F	Final

Women
Date Event	Sun 2	Mon 3	Tue 4	Wed 5
Women's 49 kg	F			
Women's 55 kg		F		
Women's 59 kg		F		
Women's 64 kg			F	
Women's 76 kg			F	
Women's 87 kg				F
Women's +87 kg				F

== Medal summary ==
=== Medal table ===
* Host nation (Paraguay)

Rank	Nation	Gold	Silver	Bronze	Total
1	Colombia	5	5	2	12
2	Venezuela	4	3	4	11
3	Ecuador	4	2	0	6
4	Brazil	1	2	4	7
5	Peru	0	2	0	2
6	Argentina	0	0	2	2
6	Chile	0	0	2	2
Totals (7 entries)		14	14	14	42

=== Medalists ===
==== Men ====
Event	Gold		Silver		Bronze	
Men's 61 kg	Thiago Silva; Brazil	271 kg	Habib de las Salas; Colombia	268 kg	Wilkeinner Lugo; Venezuela	261 kg
Men's 67 kg	Francisco Mosquera; Colombia	317 kg	Jair Reyes; Ecuador	316 kg	Reinner Arango; Venezuela	297 kg
Men's 73 kg	Julio Mayora; Venezuela	311 kg	Walter Beleño Cogollo; Colombia	303 kg	Josué Lucas Ferreira da Silva; Brazil	290 kg
Men's 81 kg	Gustavo Maldonado; Colombia	335 kg	Iván Escudero; Ecuador	335 kg	Darvin Castro; Venezuela	321 kg
Men's 96 kg	Keydomar Vallenilla; Venezuela	394 kg	Brayan Rodallegas; Colombia	360 kg	Marco Machado; Brazil	351 kg
Men's 109 kg	Jhohan Sanguino; Venezuela	363 kg	Hernán Viera; Peru	346 kg	Camilo Zapata; Chile	325 kg
Men's +109 kg	Dixon Arroyo; Ecuador	372 kg	Luis Quiñones; Colombia	360 kg	Roman Velásquez; Chile	307 kg

==== Women ====
Event	Gold		Silver		Bronze	
Women's 49 kg	Katherin Echandía; Venezuela	187 kg	Natasha Rosa Figueiredo; Brazil	186 kg	Yineth Santoya; Colombia	160 kg
Women's 55 kg	Rosalba Morales; Colombia	201 kg	Shoely Mego; Peru	192 kg	Letícia Moraes; Brazil	191 kg
Women's 59 kg	Yenny Álvarez; Colombia	220 kg	Génesis Rodríguez; Venezuela	217 kg	María Luz Casadevall; Argentina	208 kg
Women's 64 kg	Natalia Llamosa; Colombia	220 kg	Anyelin Venegas; Venezuela	210 kg	Tatiana Ullua; Argentina	203 kg
Women's 76 kg	Angie Palacios; Ecuador	247 kg	Mari Sánchez; Colombia	240 kg	Amanda Schott; Brazil	233 kg
Women's 87 kg	Neisi Dájomes; Ecuador	250 kg	Laura Amaro; Brazil	247 kg	Dayana Chirinos; Venezuela	242 kg
Women's +87 kg	Lisseth Ayoví; Ecuador	265 kg	Yaniuska Espinosa; Venezuela	247 kg	Yeinny Geles; Colombia	246 kg

== Participation ==
Thirteen nations participated in weightlifting events of the 2022 South American Games.

- Argentina
- Aruba
- Bolivia
- Brazil
- Chile
- Colombia
- Curaçao
- Ecuador
- Panama
- Paraguay
- Peru
- Uruguay
- Venezuela
