= 2024 Pan American Weightlifting Championships =

- Venue: José "Papa" Carrillo Gymnasium
- Location: Caracas, Venezuela
- Dates: 24–28 February
- Competitors: 110 from 18 nations

The 2024 Pan American Weightlifting Championships were held in Caracas, Venezuela from 24 to 28 February 2024.

== Medal summary ==
=== Men ===
Event	Gold		Silver		Bronze	
55 kg
Snatch	Howard Roche; Puerto Rico	103 kg	Juan Barco; Mexico	101 kg	José Poox; Mexico	99 kg
Clean & Jerk	Juan Barco; Mexico	127 kg	José Poox; Mexico	127 kg	Howard Roche; Puerto Rico	119 kg
Total	Juan Barco; Mexico	228 kg	José Poox; Mexico	226 kg	Howard Roche; Puerto Rico	222 kg
61 kg
Snatch	Víctor Garrido; Ecuador	123 kg	Héctor Viveros; Colombia	115 kg	Jhony Arteaga; Ecuador	115 kg
Clean & Jerk	Luis Bardalez; Peru	150 kg	Héctor Viveros; Colombia	149 kg	Wilkeinner Lugo; Venezuela	144 kg
Total	Héctor Viveros; Colombia	264 kg	Luis Bardalez; Peru	264 kg	Víctor Garrido; Ecuador	263 kg
67 kg
Snatch	Héctor García; Colombia	135 kg	Orlando Vásquez; Nicaragua	131 kg	Luis Cano; Colombia	129 kg
Clean & Jerk	Luis Cano; Colombia	164 kg	Endy Rivas; Venezuela	160 kg	Héctor García; Colombia	157 kg
Total	Luis Cano; Colombia	293 kg	Héctor García; Colombia	292 kg	Endy Rivas; Venezuela	287 kg
73 kg
Snatch	Julio Mayora; Venezuela	154 kg	Luis Javier Mosquera; Colombia	153 kg	Jorge Cárdenas; Mexico	140 kg
Clean & Jerk	Luis Javier Mosquera; Colombia	184 kg	Reinner Arango; Venezuela	170 kg	Sergio Cares; Chile	164 kg
Total	Luis Javier Mosquera; Colombia	337 kg	Reinner Arango; Venezuela	308 kg	Jorge Cárdenas; Mexico	300 kg
81 kg
Snatch	Edwin Lagarejo; Colombia	143 kg	Richard Ollo; Venezuela	137 kg	Ariel Galeano; Argentina	130 kg
Clean & Jerk	Edwin Lagarejo; Colombia	170 kg	Richard Ollo; Venezuela	168 kg	Ariel Galeano; Argentina	160 kg
Total	Edwin Lagarejo; Colombia	313 kg	Richard Ollo; Venezuela	305 kg	Ariel Galeano; Argentina	290 kg
89 kg
Snatch	Yeison López; Colombia	175 kg	Arley Méndez; Chile	170 kg	Boady Santavy; Canada	168 kg
Clean & Jerk	Yeison López; Colombia	207 kg	Olfides Sáez; Cuba	206 kg	Arley Méndez; Chile	205 kg
Total	Yeison López; Colombia	382 kg	Arley Méndez; Chile	375 kg	Olfides Sáez; Cuba	366 kg
96 kg
Snatch	Keydomar Vallenilla; Venezuela	170 kg	Marco Machado; Brazil	161 kg	Neiser Grefa; Ecuador	148 kg
Clean & Jerk	Keydomar Vallenilla; Venezuela	212 kg	Neiser Grefa; Ecuador	190 kg	Norwin Washington; Nicaragua	167 kg
Total	Keydomar Vallenilla; Venezuela	382 kg	Neiser Grefa; Ecuador	338 kg	Norwin Washington; Nicaragua	307 kg
102 kg
Snatch	Óscar Garcés; Colombia	168 kg	Jeyson Arias; Venezuela	163 kg	Jhohan Sanguino; Venezuela	163 kg
Clean & Jerk	Jeyson Arias; Venezuela	212 kg	Jhohan Sanguino; Venezuela	202 kg	Óscar Garcés; Colombia	201 kg
Total	Jeyson Arias; Venezuela	375 kg	Óscar Garcés; Colombia	369 kg	Jhohan Sanguino; Venezuela	365 kg
109 kg
Snatch	Yeimar Mendoza; Colombia	152 kg	Nicolás Cuevas; Chile	151 kg	Not awarded	
Clean & Jerk	Yeimar Mendoza; Colombia	190 kg	Nicolás Cuevas; Chile	180 kg	Not awarded	
Total	Yeimar Mendoza; Colombia	342 kg	Nicolás Cuevas; Chile	331 kg	Not awarded	
+109 kg
Snatch	Rafael Cerro; Colombia	177 kg	Dixon Arroyo; Ecuador	170 kg	Gilberto Lemus; Guatemala	168 kg
Clean & Jerk	Rafael Cerro; Colombia	216 kg	Hernán Viera; Peru	215 kg	Josué Medina; Mexico	200 kg
Total	Rafael Cerro; Colombia	393 kg	Hernán Viera; Peru	365 kg	Josué Medina; Mexico	361 kg

=== Women ===
Event	Gold		Silver		Bronze	
45 kg
Snatch	Victoria Tovar; Venezuela	68 kg	Mariangeli Martínez; Venezuela	62 kg	Not awarded	
Clean & Jerk	Victoria Tovar; Venezuela	87 kg	Mariangeli Martínez; Venezuela	82 kg	Not awarded	
Total	Victoria Tovar; Venezuela	155 kg	Mariangeli Martínez; Venezuela	144 kg	Not awarded	
49 kg
Snatch	Ana López; Mexico	86 kg	Katherin Echandía; Venezuela	83 kg	Andrea de la Herrán; Mexico	80 kg
Clean & Jerk	Katherin Echandía; Venezuela	102 kg	Ana López; Mexico	102 kg	Andrea de la Herrán; Mexico	95 kg
Total	Ana López; Mexico	188 kg	Katherin Echandía; Venezuela	185 kg	Andrea de la Herrán; Mexico	175 kg
55 kg
Snatch	Josée Gallant; Canada	89 kg	Rosselyn Uzcátegui; Venezuela	83 kg	Victoria Grenni; El Salvador	75 kg
Clean & Jerk	Josée Gallant; Canada	109 kg	Rosselyn Uzcátegui; Venezuela	103 kg	Victoria Grenni; El Salvador	96 kg
Total	Josée Gallant; Canada	198 kg	Rosselyn Uzcátegui; Venezuela	186 kg	Victoria Grenni; El Salvador	171 kg
59 kg
Snatch	Génesis Rodríguez; Venezuela	101 kg	Anyelin Venegas; Venezuela	100 kg	Janeth Gómez; Mexico	100 kg
Clean & Jerk	Anyelin Venegas; Venezuela	126 kg	Janeth Gómez; Mexico	121 kg	Génesis Rodríguez; Venezuela	120 kg
Total	Anyelin Venegas; Venezuela	226 kg	Génesis Rodríguez; Venezuela	221 kg	Janeth Gómez; Mexico	221 kg
64 kg
Snatch	Charlotte Simoneau; Canada	96 kg	Rosivé Silgado; Colombia	95 kg	Rosalba Morales; Colombia	94 kg
Clean & Jerk	Rosivé Silgado; Colombia	125 kg	Charlotte Simoneau; Canada	116 kg	Rosalba Morales; Colombia	115 kg
Total	Rosivé Silgado; Colombia	220 kg	Charlotte Simoneau; Canada	212 kg	Rosalba Morales; Colombia	209 kg
71 kg
Snatch	Angie Palacios; Ecuador	110 kg	Yeniuska Mirabal; Cuba	107 kg	Amanda Schott; Brazil	105 kg
Clean & Jerk	Angie Palacios; Ecuador	130 kg	Mari Sánchez; Colombia	128 kg	Diana García; Mexico	126 kg
Total	Angie Palacios; Ecuador	240 kg	Mari Sánchez; Colombia	232 kg	Diana García; Mexico	219 kg
76 kg
Snatch	Erika Sinisterra; Colombia	98 kg	Laura Peinado; Venezuela	97 kg	Hellen Escobar; Colombia	95 kg
Clean & Jerk	Hellen Escobar; Colombia	126 kg	Nataly Geerman; Aruba	125 kg	Bella Paredes; Ecuador	117 kg
Total	Hellen Escobar; Colombia	221 kg	Nataly Geerman; Aruba	215 kg	Laura Peinado; Venezuela	213 kg
81 kg
Snatch	Neisi Dájomes; Ecuador	121 kg AM	Lisbeth Nolasco; Mexico	109 kg	Laura Amaro; Brazil	108 kg
Clean & Jerk	Neisi Dájomes; Ecuador	141 kg	Yudelina Mejía; Dominican Republic	136 kg	Laura Amaro; Brazil	135 kg
Total	Neisi Dájomes; Ecuador	262 kg	Yudelina Mejía; Dominican Republic	244 kg	Laura Amaro; Brazil	243 kg
87 kg
Snatch	Sirley Montaño; Colombia	103 kg	Dayana Chirinos; Venezuela	102 kg	Dayana Mina; Ecuador	101 kg
Clean & Jerk	Dayana Chirinos; Venezuela	138 kg	Sirley Montaño; Colombia	136 kg	Dayana Mina; Ecuador	131 kg
Total	Dayana Chirinos; Venezuela	240 kg	Sirley Montaño; Colombia	239 kg	Dayana Mina; Ecuador	232 kg
+87 kg
Snatch	Lisseth Ayoví; Ecuador	118 kg	Naryury Pérez; Venezuela	117 kg	Arantzazu Pavez; Chile	105 kg
Clean & Jerk	Lisseth Ayoví; Ecuador	151 kg	Naryury Pérez; Venezuela	148 kg	Arantzazu Pavez; Chile	130 kg
Total	Lisseth Ayoví; Ecuador	269 kg	Naryury Pérez; Venezuela	265 kg	Arantzazu Pavez; Chile	235 kg

== Medal table ==
Ranking by Big (Total result) medals

* Host nation (Venezuela)

Rank	Nation	Gold	Silver	Bronze	Total
1	Colombia	9	4	1	14
2	Venezuela*	5	7	3	15
3	Ecuador	3	1	2	6
4	Mexico	2	1	5	8
5	Canada	1	1	0	2
6	Chile	0	2	1	3
7	Peru	0	2	0	2
8	Aruba	0	1	0	1
8	Dominican Republic	0	1	0	1
10	Argentina	0	0	1	1
10	Brazil	0	0	1	1
10	Cuba	0	0	1	1
10	El Salvador	0	0	1	1
10	Nicaragua	0	0	1	1
10	Puerto Rico	0	0	1	1
Totals (15 entries)		20	20	18	58

Ranking by all medals: Big (Total result) and Small (Snatch and Clean & Jerk)

* Host nation (Venezuela)

Rank	Nation	Gold	Silver	Bronze	Total
1	Colombia	25	10	7	42
2	Venezuela*	15	23	6	44
3	Ecuador	10	3	7	20
4	Mexico	4	6	12	22
5	Canada	4	2	1	7
6	Peru	1	3	0	4
7	Puerto Rico	1	0	2	3
8	Chile	0	5	5	10
9	Cuba	0	2	1	3
10	Aruba	0	2	0	2
10	Dominican Republic	0	2	0	2
12	Brazil	0	1	4	5
13	Nicaragua	0	1	2	3
14	Argentina	0	0	3	3
14	El Salvador	0	0	3	3
16	Guatemala	0	0	1	1
Totals (16 entries)		60	60	54	174

== Team ranking ==
=== Men ===
Rank	Team	Points
1	Colombia	726
2	Venezuela	634
3	Mexico	290
4	Ecuador	277
5	Chile	214
6	Peru	211

=== Women ===
Rank	Team	Points
1	Venezuela	761
2	Colombia	653
3	Ecuador	514
4	Mexico	478
5	Canada	341
6	Chile	135
