= Gustavo Maldonado =

Colombian weightlifter

Personal information
- Full name: Gustavo Adolfo Maldonado Muñoz

Sport
- Country: Colombia
- Sport: Weightlifting
- Weight class: 81 kg
Medal record
Representing Colombia
Men's weightlifting
Pan American Championships
Gold medal – first place	2022 Bogotá	81 kg
Central American and Caribbean Games
Gold medal – first place	2023 San Salvador	96 kg CJ
Silver medal – second place	2023 San Salvador	96 kg S
South American Games
Gold medal – first place	2022 Asunción	81 kg
Bolivarian Games
Silver medal – second place	2022 Valledupar	81 kg S
Silver medal – second place	2022 Valledupar	81 kg CJ

Gustavo Adolfo Maldonado Muñoz is a Colombian weightlifter. He won the gold medal in the men's 81 kg event at the 2022 South American Games held in Asunción, Paraguay. He also won the gold medal in the men's 81 kg event at the 2022 Pan American Weightlifting Championships held in Bogotá, Colombia.

Maldonado is a two-time silver medalist at the 2022 Bolivarian Games held in Valledupar, Colombia. He competed in the men's 81 kg event at the 2022 World Weightlifting Championships in Bogotá, Colombia.

== Achievements ==
Year	Venue	Weight	Snatch (kg)				Clean & Jerk (kg)				Total	Rank
Year	Venue	Weight	1	2	3	Rank	1	2	3	Rank	Total	Rank
Representing Colombia
World Championships
2022	Bogotá, Colombia	81 kg	~~148~~	148	~~152~~	11	~~185~~	188	191	6	339	9
2024	Manama, Bahrain	81 kg	150	~~154~~	~~155~~	10	180	185	~~190~~	11	335	12
Pan American Championships
2022	Bogotá, Colombia	81 kg	~~140~~	143	~~147~~	3rd place, bronze medalist(s)	180	183	186	1st place, gold medalist(s)	329	1st place, gold medalist(s)
Central American and Caribbean Games
2023	San Salvador, El Salvador	81 kg	145	148	~~150~~	2nd place, silver medalist(s)	180	~~185~~	—	1st place, gold medalist(s)	—N/a	—N/a
South American Games
2018	Cochabamba, Bolivia	85 kg	140	145	~~147~~	4	175	182	~~186~~	4	327	4
2022	Asunción, Paraguay	81 kg	140	145	150	—N/a	180	185	~~190~~	—N/a	335	1st place, gold medalist(s)
Bolivarian Games
2022	Valledupar, Colombia	81 kg	125	132	134	2nd place, silver medalist(s)	175	180	183	2nd place, silver medalist(s)	—N/a	—N/a
Youth World Championships
2013	Tashkent, Uzbekistan	62 kg	105	~~109~~	~~111~~	9	120	~~125~~	~~125~~	23	225	14
