= Katherin Echandía =

Venezuelan weightlifter (born 2001)

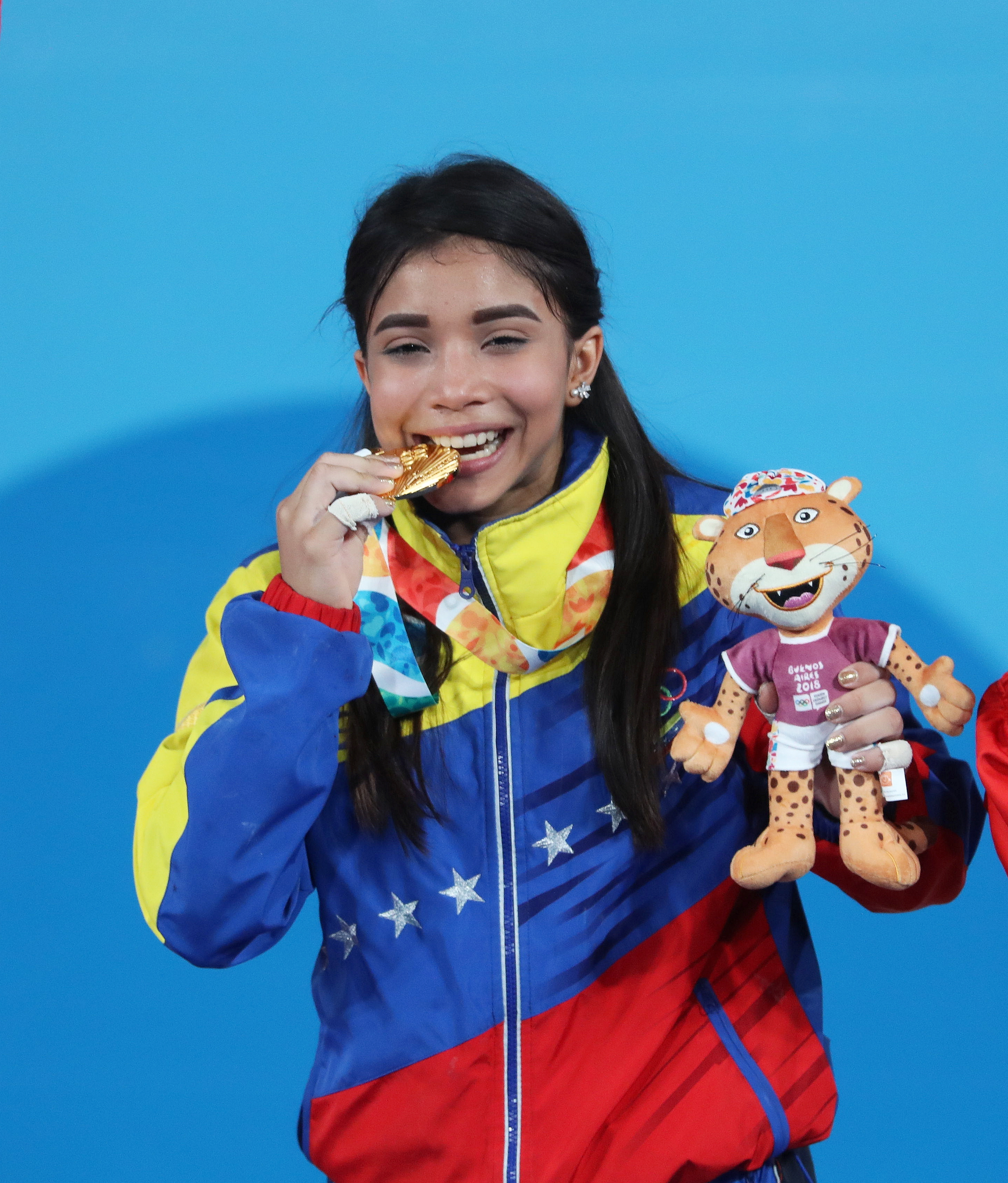
- Echandia at the 2018 Summer Youth Olympics

Personal information
- Full name: Katherin Oriana Echandía Zárate
- Born: 14 August 2001 (age 25)

Sport
- Country: Venezuela
- Sport: Weightlifting
- Weight class: 48 kg; 49 kg; 53 kg
Medal record
Women's weightlifting
Representing Venezuela
World Championships
Bronze medal – third place	2018 Ashgabat	45 kg
Pan American Games
Silver medal – second place	2023 Santiago	49 kg
Pan American Championships
Silver medal – second place	2024 Caracas	49 kg
Silver medal – second place	2025 Cali	53 kg
Bronze medal – third place	2026 Panama City	53 kg
South American Games
Gold medal – first place	2022 Asunción	49 kg
Gold medal – first place	2026 Santa Fe	53 kg
Bolivarian Games
Gold medal – first place	2022 Valledupar	49 kg S
Gold medal – first place	2022 Valledupar	49 kg CJ
Youth Olympic Games
Gold medal – first place	2018 Buenos Aires	44 kg
Junior Pan American Games
Bronze medal – third place	2021 Cali-Valle	49 kg

Katherin Oriana Echandía Zárate (born 14 August 2001) is a Venezuelan weightlifter. She won the bronze medal in the women's 45 kg event at the 2018 World Weightlifting Championships held in Ashgabat, Turkmenistan. She won two gold medals at the 2022 Bolivarian Games held in Valledupar, Colombia.

== Career ==
Echandía won the gold medal in the girls' 44 kg event at the 2018 Summer Youth Olympics held in Buenos Aires, Argentina. A month later, she won the bronze medal in the women's 45 kg event at the 2018 World Weightlifting Championships in Ashgabat, Turkmenistan. Echandía also competed in the women's 49 kg event at the 2019 World Weightlifting Championships in Pattaya, Thailand.

Echandía won the bronze medal in the women's 49 kg event at the 2021 Junior Pan American Games held in Cali and Valle, Colombia.

She won two gold medals at the 2022 Bolivarian Games held in Valledupar, Colombia.

She won the gold medal in her event at the 2022 South American Games held in Asunción, Paraguay. Two months later, she competed in the women's 49 kg event at the 2022 World Weightlifting Championships held in Bogotá, Colombia.

Echandía competed in the women's 49 kg event at the 2023 World Weightlifting Championships held in Riyadh, Saudi Arabia. She won the silver medal in the women's 49 kg event at the 2023 Pan American Games held in Santiago, Chile.

In 2024, she won the silver medal in the women's 49 kg event at the Pan American Weightlifting Championships held in Caracas, Venezuela. Later that year she set personal bests in Snatch, Clean & Jerk and total at the IWF World Cup.

In August 2024, Echandía competed in the women's 49 kg event at the 2024 Summer Olympics held in Paris, France. She made one successful attempt both in Snatch and Clean & Jerk setting 188 kg in total, allowing her to place ninth.

== Achievements ==
Year	Venue	Weight	Snatch (kg)				Clean & Jerk (kg)				Total	Rank
Year	Venue	Weight	1	2	3	Rank	1	2	3	Rank	Total	Rank
Summer Olympics
2024	Paris, France	49 kg	83	~~86~~	~~86~~	—N/a	105	~~107~~	~~109~~	—N/a	188	9
World Championships
2018	Ashgabat, Turkmenistan	45 kg	67	~~71~~	~~71~~	5	86	90	~~93~~	3rd place, bronze medalist(s)	157	3rd place, bronze medalist(s)
2019	Pattaya, Thailand	49 kg	75	78	~~80~~	15	95	98	~~100~~	13	176	14
2022	Bogotá, Colombia	49 kg	~~80~~	~~80~~	80	17	102	~~105~~	~~105~~	11	182	11
2023	Riyadh, Saudi Arabia	49 kg	74	77	~~80~~	16	95	100	~~105~~	15	177	15
IWF World Cup
2024	Phuket, Thailand	49 kg	81	83	85	9	102	106	108	7	193	6
Pan American Games
2023	Santiago, Chile	49 kg	79	82	84	—N/a	101	~~104~~	105	—N/a	189	2nd place, silver medalist(s)
Pan American Championships
2020	Santo Domingo, Dominican Republic	49 kg	~~77~~	~~77~~	~~77~~	—	96	~~100~~	~~100~~	6	—	—
2021	Guayaquil, Ecuador	49 kg	70	~~76~~	76	6	90	95	~~99~~	8	171	7
2022	Bogotá, Colombia	49 kg	~~78~~	~~76~~	78	9	98	~~103~~	~~105~~	8	176	8
2024	Caracas, Venezuela	49 kg	81	83	~~85~~	2nd place, silver medalist(s)	102	~~106~~	~~106~~	1st place, gold medalist(s)	185	2nd place, silver medalist(s)
2025	Cali, Colombia	53 kg	~~84~~	84	87	5	107	110	112	1st place, gold medalist(s)	199	2nd place, silver medalist(s)
