= 2022 Pan American Weightlifting Championships =

International weightlifting competition

2022 Pan American Championships
- Venue: Palacio de los Deportes
- Location: Bogotá, Colombia
- Dates: 24–29 July

The 2022 Pan American Weightlifting Championships were held in Bogotá, Colombia from 24 to 29 July 2022.

== Medal summary ==
=== Men ===
Event	Gold		Silver		Bronze	
55 kg
Snatch	Miguel Suárez; Colombia	105 kg	José Poox; Mexico	104 kg	Jhony Arteaga; Ecuador	103 kg
Clean & Jerk	Miguel Suárez; Colombia	142 kg AM	José Poox; Mexico	130 kg	Osmel Argote; Cuba	128 kg
Total	Miguel Suárez; Colombia	247 kg	José Poox; Mexico	234 kg	Osmel Argote; Cuba	228 kg
61 kg
Snatch	Jhon Serna; Colombia	122 kg	Habib de las Salas; Colombia	121 kg	Víctor Garrido; Ecuador	120 kg
Clean & Jerk	Hampton Morris; United States	162 kg JWR	Arley Calderón; Cuba	158 kg	Habib de las Salas; Colombia	152 kg
Total	Hampton Morris; United States	279 kg	Arley Calderón; Cuba	275 kg	Habib de las Salas; Colombia	273 kg
67 kg
Snatch	Jair Reyes; Ecuador	136 kg	Francisco Mosquera; Colombia	135 kg	Luis Bardalez; Peru	130 kg
Clean & Jerk	Jair Reyes; Ecuador	179 kg	Francisco Mosquera; Colombia	177 kg	Luis Bardalez; Peru	169 kg
Total	Jair Reyes; Ecuador	315 kg	Francisco Mosquera; Colombia	312 kg	Luis Bardalez; Peru	299 kg
73 kg
Snatch	Jorge Cárdenas; Mexico	145 kg	Julio Cedeño; Dominican Republic	144 kg	Jacob Horst; United States	143 kg
Clean & Jerk	Julio Cedeño; Dominican Republic	174 kg	Jorge Cárdenas; Mexico	170 kg	Jonathan Muñoz; Mexico	170 kg
Total	Julio Cedeño; Dominican Republic	318 kg	Jorge Cárdenas; Mexico	315 kg	Jonathan Muñoz; Mexico	310 kg
81 kg
Snatch	Darvin Castro; Venezuela	147 kg	Juniel Muñoz; Mexico	146 kg	Gustavo Maldonado; Colombia	143 kg
Clean & Jerk	Gustavo Maldonado; Colombia	186 kg	Darvin Castro; Venezuela	177 kg	Ray Reyes; Dominican Republic	174 kg
Total	Gustavo Maldonado; Colombia	329 kg	Darvin Castro; Venezuela	324 kg	Juniel Muñoz; Mexico	316 kg
89 kg
Snatch	Brayan Rodallegas; Colombia	172 kg AM	Keydomar Vallenilla; Venezuela	171 kg	Zacarías Bonnat; Dominican Republic	165 kg
Clean & Jerk	Brayan Rodallegas; Colombia	210 kg AM	Zacarías Bonnat; Dominican Republic	207 kg	Keydomar Vallenilla; Venezuela	206 kg
Total	Brayan Rodallegas; Colombia	382 kg AM	Keydomar Vallenilla; Venezuela	377 kg	Zacarías Bonnat; Dominican Republic	372 kg
96 kg
Snatch	Andrés Serna; Colombia	162 kg	Marco Machado; Brazil	161 kg	Amel Atencia; Peru	150 kg
Clean & Jerk	Andrés Serna; Colombia	200 kg	José López; Mexico	190 kg	Marco Machado; Brazil	187 kg
Total	Andrés Serna; Colombia	362 kg	Marco Machado; Brazil	348 kg	José López; Mexico	338 kg
102 kg
Snatch	Jhor Moreno; Colombia	168 kg	Yeimar Mendoza; Colombia	167 kg	Juan Zaldívar; Cuba	161 kg
Clean & Jerk	Jhor Moreno; Colombia	202 kg	Yeimar Mendoza; Colombia	201 kg	Ryan Sester; United States	196 kg
Total	Jhor Moreno; Colombia	370 kg	Yeimar Mendoza; Colombia	368 kg	Luis Lamenza; Puerto Rico	352 kg
109 kg
Snatch	Juan Columbié; Cuba	168 kg	Jhohan Sanguino; Venezuela	167 kg	Antonio Govea; Mexico	155 kg
Clean & Jerk	Hernán Viera; Peru	209 kg	Jhohan Sanguino; Venezuela	194 kg	Juan Columbié; Cuba	192 kg
Total	Hernán Viera; Peru	362 kg	Jhohan Sanguino; Venezuela	361 kg	Juan Columbié; Cuba	360 kg
+109 kg
Snatch	Gilberto Lemus; Guatemala	173 kg	Alejandro Medina; United States	172 kg	Raúl Manríquez; Mexico	171 kg
Clean & Jerk	Raúl Manríquez; Mexico	215 kg	Miklos Bencsik; Canada	208 kg	Caine Wilkes; United States	205 kg
Total	Raúl Manríquez; Mexico	386 kg	Gilberto Lemus; Guatemala	375 kg	Alejandro Medina; United States	374 kg

=== Women ===
Event	Gold		Silver		Bronze	
45 kg
Snatch	Emily Figueiredo; Brazil	73 kg	Cicely Kyle; United States	71 kg	Alejandra Álvarez; Colombia	69 kg
Clean & Jerk	Emily Figueiredo; Brazil	90 kg	Cicely Kyle; United States	89 kg	Rosielis Quintana; Venezuela	87 kg
Total	Emily Figueiredo; Brazil	163 kg	Cicely Kyle; United States	160 kg	Rosielis Quintana; Venezuela	155 kg
49 kg
Snatch	Andrea de la Herrán; Mexico	85 kg	Natasha Rosa Figueiredo; Brazil	84 kg	Hayley Reichardt; United States	84 kg
Clean & Jerk	Jourdan Delacruz; United States	108 kg	Hayley Reichardt; United States	108 kg	Natasha Rosa Figueiredo; Brazil	106 kg
Total	Hayley Reichardt; United States	192 kg	Jourdan Delacruz; United States	191 kg	Natasha Rosa Figueiredo; Brazil	190 kg
55 kg
Snatch	Irene Borrego; Mexico	86 kg	Letícia Moraes; Brazil	85 kg	Yorlis Zabala; Venezuela	84 kg
Clean & Jerk	Shayla Moore; United States	110 kg	Jennifer Hernández; Ecuador	109 kg	Letícia Moraes; Brazil	105 kg
Total	Shayla Moore; United States	193 kg	Jennifer Hernández; Ecuador	192 kg	Letícia Moraes; Brazil	190 kg
59 kg
Snatch	Yenny Álvarez; Colombia	102 kg AM	Concepción Úsuga; Colombia	98 kg	Génesis Rodríguez; Venezuela	94 kg
Clean & Jerk	Yenny Álvarez; Colombia	124 kg	Taylor Wilkins; United States	122 kg	Concepción Úsuga; Colombia	118 kg
Total	Yenny Álvarez; Colombia	226 kg	Concepción Úsuga; Colombia	216 kg	Taylor Wilkins; United States	215 kg
64 kg
Snatch	Natalia Llamosa; Colombia	106 kg	Julieth Rodríguez; Colombia	101 kg	Queysi Rojas; Mexico	93 kg
Clean & Jerk	Natalia Llamosa; Colombia	129 kg	Julieth Rodríguez; Colombia	123 kg	Queysi Rojas; Mexico	115 kg
Total	Natalia Llamosa; Colombia	235 kg	Julieth Rodríguez; Colombia	224 kg	Queysi Rojas; Mexico	208 kg
71 kg
Snatch	Angie Palacios; Ecuador	113 kg AM	Mari Sánchez; Colombia	112 kg	Jessica Jarquín; Mexico	102 kg
Clean & Jerk	Mari Sánchez; Colombia	134 kg	Angie Palacios; Ecuador	134 kg	Meredith Alwine; United States	132 kg
Total	Angie Palacios; Ecuador	247 kg	Mari Sánchez; Colombia	246 kg	Meredith Alwine; United States	234 kg
76 kg
Snatch	Mattie Rogers; United States	111 kg	Hellen Escobar; Colombia	106 kg	Yeniuska Mirabal; Cuba	105 kg
Clean & Jerk	Mattie Rogers; United States	141 kg	Hellen Escobar; Colombia	133 kg	Mailyn Echeverría; Colombia	133 kg
Total	Mattie Rogers; United States	252 kg	Hellen Escobar; Colombia	239 kg	Mailyn Echeverría; Colombia	236 kg
81 kg
Snatch	Neisi Dájomes; Ecuador	120 kg AM	Yudelina Mejía; Dominican Republic	113 kg	Laura Amaro; Brazil	105 kg
Clean & Jerk	Neisi Dájomes; Ecuador	143 kg AM	Yudelina Mejía; Dominican Republic	139 kg	Laura Amaro; Brazil	138 kg
Total	Neisi Dájomes; Ecuador	263 kg AM	Yudelina Mejía; Dominican Republic	252 kg	Laura Amaro; Brazil	243 kg
87 kg
Snatch	Yeinny Geles; Colombia	111 kg	Ayamey Medina; Cuba	110 kg	Tamara Salazar; Ecuador	109 kg
Clean & Jerk	Tamara Salazar; Ecuador	142 kg	Yeinny Geles; Colombia	138 kg	Ayamey Medina; Cuba	137 kg
Total	Tamara Salazar; Ecuador	251 kg	Yeinny Geles; Colombia	249 kg	Ayamey Medina; Cuba	247 kg
+87 kg
Snatch	Sarah Robles; United States	125 kg	Crismery Santana; Dominican Republic	118 kg	Verónica Saladín; Dominican Republic	116 kg
Clean & Jerk	Sarah Robles; United States	154 kg	Lisseth Ayoví; Ecuador	149 kg	Crismery Santana; Dominican Republic	145 kg
Total	Sarah Robles; United States	279 kg	Lisseth Ayoví; Ecuador	264 kg	Crismery Santana; Dominican Republic	263 kg

== Medal table ==
Ranking by Big (Total result) medals

* Host nation (Colombia)

Rank	Nation	Gold	Silver	Bronze	Total
1	Colombia*	7	7	2	16
2	United States	5	2	3	10
3	Ecuador	4	2	0	6
4	Mexico	1	2	4	7
5	Brazil	1	1	3	5
6	Dominican Republic	1	1	2	4
7	Peru	1	0	1	2
8	Venezuela	0	3	1	4
9	Cuba	0	1	3	4
10	Guatemala	0	1	0	1
11	Puerto Rico	0	0	1	1
Totals (11 entries)		20	20	20	60

Ranking by all medals: Big (Total result) and Small (Snatch and Clean & Jerk)

* Host nation (Colombia)

Rank	Nation	Gold	Silver	Bronze	Total
1	Colombia*	23	19	7	49
2	United States	12	7	8	27
3	Ecuador	10	5	3	18
4	Mexico	5	7	10	22
5	Brazil	3	4	8	15
6	Dominican Republic	2	6	6	14
7	Peru	2	0	4	6
8	Venezuela	1	7	5	13
9	Cuba	1	3	8	12
10	Guatemala	1	1	0	2
11	Canada	0	1	0	1
12	Puerto Rico	0	0	1	1
Totals (12 entries)		60	60	60	180

== Team ranking ==
=== Men ===
Rank	Team	Points
1	Colombia	707
2	Mexico	681
3	Venezuela	620
4	Dominican Republic	593
5	Cuba	582
6	Ecuador	581

=== Women ===
Rank	Team	Points
1	Colombia	700
2	Ecuador	684
3	United States	662
4	Dominican Republic	619
5	Brazil	598
6	Mexico	596
