= Jair Reyes =

Ecuadorian weightlifter (born 2000)

Personal information
- Full name: Jair Abimelet Reyes Vidal
- Born: 11 July 2000 (age 25)

Sport
- Country: Ecuador
- Sport: Weightlifting
- Weight class: 67 kg
Medal record
Men's weightlifting
Representing Ecuador
Pan American Championships
Gold medal – first place	2022 Bogotá	67 kg
Bronze medal – third place	2021 Guayaquil	67 kg
South American Games
Silver medal – second place	2022 Asunción	67 kg
Bolivarian Games
Silver medal – second place	2022 Valledupar	67 kg S
Silver medal – second place	2022 Valledupar	67 kg CJ

Jair Abimelet Reyes Vidal (born 11 July 2000) is an Ecuadorian weightlifter. He won the gold medal in the men's 67 kg event at the 2022 Pan American Weightlifting Championships held in Bogotá, Colombia. He won two silver medals at the 2022 Bolivarian Games held in Valledupar, Colombia.

Reyes won the bronze medal in the men's 67 kg event at the 2021 Pan American Weightlifting Championships held in Guayaquil, Ecuador. He competed in the men's 67 kg event at the 2021 World Weightlifting Championships held in Tashkent, Uzbekistan.

Reyes won the silver medal in his event at the 2022 South American Games held in Asunción, Paraguay.

== Achievements ==
Year	Venue	Weight	Snatch (kg)				Clean & Jerk (kg)				Total	Rank
Year	Venue	Weight	1	2	3	Rank	1	2	3	Rank	Total	Rank
World Championships
2021	Tashkent, Uzbekistan	67 kg	130	~~134~~	~~134~~	14	164	168	172	6	302	8
Pan American Championships
2020	Santo Domingo, Dominican Republic	67 kg	120	125	132	6	150	158	164	6	296	6
2021	Guayaquil, Ecuador	67 kg	127	131	133	3rd place, bronze medalist(s)	161	166	168	4	301	3rd place, bronze medalist(s)
2022	Bogotá, Colombia	67 kg	134	136	~~140~~	1st place, gold medalist(s)	~~168~~	168	179	1st place, gold medalist(s)	315	1st place, gold medalist(s)
South American Games
2022	Asunción, Paraguay	67 kg	131	136	140	—N/a	~~160~~	160	176	—N/a	316	2nd place, silver medalist(s)
Bolivarian Games
2022	Valledupar, Colombia	67 kg	~~131~~	132	137	2nd place, silver medalist(s)	164	166	175	2nd place, silver medalist(s)	—N/a	—N/a
