= Hernán Viera =

Peruvian weightlifter (born 1993)

Personal information
- Full name: Hernán Moises Viera Espinoza
- Born: 16 January 1993 (age 33)
- Height: 1.76 m (5 ft 9 in)
- Weight: 104 kg (229 lb)

Sport
- Country: Peru
- Sport: Weightlifting
Medal record
Men's weightlifting
Representing Peru
Pan American Championships
Gold medal – first place	2022 Bogotá	109 kg
Silver medal – second place	2024 Caracas	+109 kg
Bronze medal – third place	2023 Bariloche	109 kg
South American Games
Silver medal – second place	2022 Asunción	109 kg
Bronze medal – third place	2018 Cochabamba	105 kg
Bolivarian Games
Gold medal – first place	2024 Ayacucho	109 kg
Silver medal – second place	2022 Valledupar	+109 kg S
Silver medal – second place	2022 Valledupar	+109 kg CJ

Hernán Moises Viera Espinoza (born January 16, 1993) is a Peruvian male weightlifter, competing in the 105 kg category and representing Peru at international competitions. He participated in the men's 105 kg event at the 2011 World Weightlifting Championships, and at the 2016 Summer Olympics, finishing in thirteenth position.

He won the gold medal in the men's 109 kg event at the 2022 Pan American Weightlifting Championships held in Bogotá, Colombia. He won the silver medal in his event at the 2022 South American Games held in Asunción, Paraguay. He competed in the men's +102 kg event at the 2023 Pan American Games held in Santiago, Chile.

In 2024, he won the silver medal in the men's +109 kg event at the Pan American Weightlifting Championships held in Caracas, Venezuela.

== Achievements ==
Year	Venue	Weight	Snatch (kg)				Clean & Jerk (kg)				Total	Rank
Year	Venue	Weight	1	2	3	Rank	1	2	3	Rank	Total	Rank
Summer Olympics
2016	Rio de Janeiro, Brazil	105 kg										
World Championships
2011	Paris, France	94 kg	105	110	120	37	145	~~160~~	160	34	280	33
