= Keydomar Vallenilla =

Venezuelan weightlifter (born 1999)

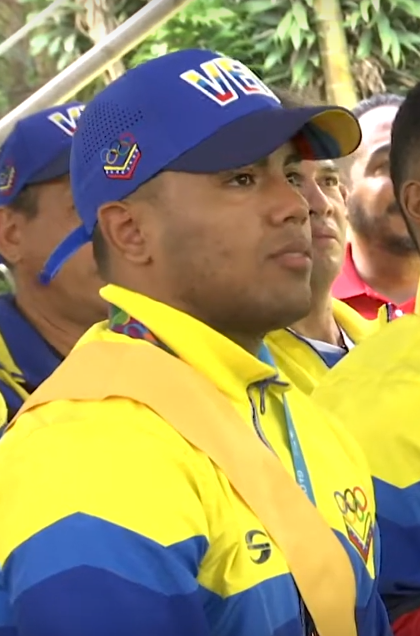
- Vallenilla in 2019

Personal information
- Native name: Keydomar Giovanni Vallenilla Sánchez
- Born: 8 October 1999 (age 26) La Guaira, Venezuela
- Weight: 94 kg (207 lb)

Sport
- Country: Venezuela
- Sport: Weightlifting
- Weight class: 89 kg; 96 kg
- Coached by: Henry Velasquez
Medal record
Men's weightlifting
Representing Venezuela
Olympic Games
Silver medal – second place	2020 Tokyo	96 kg
World Championships
Gold medal – first place	2022 Bogotá	89 kg
Bronze medal – third place	2021 Tashkent	96 kg
Bronze medal – third place	2023 Riyadh	89 kg
Pan American Games
Gold medal – first place	2023 Santiago	89 kg
Bronze medal – third place	2019 Lima	96 kg
Pan American Championships
Gold medal – first place	2021 Guayaquil	96 kg
Gold medal – first place	2023 Bariloche	89 kg
Gold medal – first place	2024 Caracas	96 kg
Gold medal – first place	2025 Cali	88 kg
Gold medal – first place	2026 Panama City	94 kg
Silver medal – second place	2022 Bogotá	89 kg
Bronze medal – third place	2017 Miami	85 kg
Central American and Caribbean Games
Gold medal – first place	2023 San Salvador	96 kg S
Gold medal – first place	2023 San Salvador	96 kg CJ
Gold medal – first place	2026 Santo Domingo	94 kg S
Gold medal – first place	2026 Santo Domingo	94 kg CJ
South American Games
Gold medal – first place	2022 Asunción	96 kg
Silver medal – second place	2018 Cochabamba	85 kg
Bolivarian Games
Gold medal – first place	2022 Valledupar	96 kg CJ
Silver medal – second place	2022 Valledupar	96 kg S

Keydomar Giovanni Vallenilla Sánchez (born 8 October 1999) is a Venezuelan weightlifter. In 2021, he won the silver medal in the men's 96 kg event at the 2020 Summer Olympics in Tokyo, Japan. He won the gold medal in the men's 89 kg event at the 2022 World Weightlifting Championships held in Bogotá, Colombia.

== Career ==
Vallenilla won the bronze medal in the Clean & Jerk in the men's 89 kg event at the 2018 World Weightlifting Championships held in Ashgabat, Turkmenistan. He also won the bronze medal in the Snatch in the men's 89 kg event at the 2019 World Weightlifting Championships held in Pattaya, Thailand.

In 2019, he won the bronze medal in the men's 96 kg event at the Pan American Games held in Lima, Peru.

In 2021, Vallenilla won the silver medal in the men's 96 kg event at the 2020 Summer Olympics in Tokyo, Japan. He won the gold medal in his event at the 2021 Pan American Weightlifting Championships held in Guayaquil, Ecuador. In that same year, he won the bronze medal in the men's 96 kg event at the 2021 World Weightlifting Championships held in Tashkent, Uzbekistan.

He won two medals, including gold, at the 2022 Bolivarian Games held in Valledupar, Colombia. He won the silver medal in his event at the 2022 Pan American Weightlifting Championships held in Bogotá, Colombia. He also set new Panamerican records in both the Snatch and the Clean & Jerk which were all improved upon during the competition by Brayan Rodallegas of Colombia.

Vallenilla won the gold medal in the men's 96 kg event at the 2022 South American Games held in Asunción, Paraguay. In December 2022, Vallenilla won the gold medal in the men's 89 kg event at the World Weightlifting Championships held in Bogotá, Colombia. In that same month, he was also elected as member of the IWF Athletes' Commission.

Vallenilla won the gold medal in the men's 89 kg event at the 2023 Pan American Weightlifting Championships held in Bariloche, Argentina. He also won the gold medal in the Snatch and Clean & Jerk events. In September 2023, he won the bronze medal in the men's 89 kg event at the World Weightlifting Championships held in Riyadh, Saudi Arabia.

In 2024, he won the gold medal in the men's 96 kg event at the Pan American Weightlifting Championships held in Caracas, Venezuela.

In August 2024, Vallenilla competed in the men's 89 kg event at the 2024 Summer Olympics held in Paris, France. He lifted 358 kg in total and placed eighth.

== Achievements ==
Year	Venue	Weight	Snatch (kg)				Clean & Jerk (kg)				Total	Rank
Year	Venue	Weight	1	2	3	Rank	1	2	3	Rank	Total	Rank
Olympic Games
2021	Tokyo, Japan	96 kg	172	175	177	—N/a	210	~~215~~	~~216~~	—N/a	387	2nd place, silver medalist(s)
2024	Paris, France	89 kg	157	162	~~165~~	—N/a	190	196	~~200~~	—N/a	358	8
World Championships
2018	Ashgabat, Turkmenistan	89 kg	160	165	~~167~~	9	195	201	204	3rd place, bronze medalist(s)	369	6
2019	Pattaya, Thailand	89 kg	164	167	169	3rd place, bronze medalist(s)	195	~~200~~	~~200~~	12	364	8
2021	Tashkent, Uzbekistan	96 kg	172	175	177	3rd place, bronze medalist(s)	210	~~214~~	214	3rd place, bronze medalist(s)	391	3rd place, bronze medalist(s)
2022	Bogotá, Colombia	89 kg	~~171~~	171	175	1st place, gold medalist(s)	210	~~213~~	~~215~~	4	385	1st place, gold medalist(s)
2023	Riyadh, Saudi Arabia	89 kg	165	169	171	3rd place, bronze medalist(s)	205	~~209~~	210	3rd place, bronze medalist(s)	381	3rd place, bronze medalist(s)
IWF World Cup
2024	Phuket, Thailand	89 kg	165	~~168~~	~~169~~	10	—	—	—	—	—	—
Pan American Games
2019	Lima, Peru	96 kg	165	169	~~171~~	—N/a	200	205	~~207~~	—N/a	374	3rd place, bronze medalist(s)
2023	Santiago, Chile	89 kg	168	172	~~177~~	—N/a	208	211	—	—N/a	383	1st place, gold medalist(s)
Pan American Championships
2017	Miami, United States	85 kg	150	156	~~160~~	4	189	~~194~~	195	3rd place, bronze medalist(s)	351	3rd place, bronze medalist(s)
2018	Santo Domingo, Dominican Republic	85 kg	151	158	162	3rd place, bronze medalist(s)	~~192~~	~~192~~	192	7	354	6
2020	Santo Domingo, Dominican Republic	96 kg	170	~~175~~	175	3rd place, bronze medalist(s)	~~210~~	~~210~~	~~210~~	—	—	—
2021	Guayaquil, Ecuador	96 kg	164	169	174	1st place, gold medalist(s)	205	209	214	1st place, gold medalist(s)	388	1st place, gold medalist(s)
2022	Bogotá, Colombia	89 kg	162	167	171	2nd place, silver medalist(s)	202	206	~~210~~	3rd place, bronze medalist(s)	377	2nd place, silver medalist(s)
2023	Bariloche, Argentina	89 kg	167	~~176~~	~~176~~	1st place, gold medalist(s)	202	212	—	1st place, gold medalist(s)	379	1st place, gold medalist(s)
2024	Caracas, Venezuela	96 kg	165	170	—	1st place, gold medalist(s)	202	212	—	1st place, gold medalist(s)	382	1st place, gold medalist(s)
2025	Cali, Colombia	88 kg	167	172	174	2nd place, silver medalist(s)	202	208	~~212~~	1st place, gold medalist(s)	382	1st place, gold medalist(s)
2026	Panama City, Panama	94 kg	167	172	177	1st place, gold medalist(s)	206	212	~~217~~	1st place, gold medalist(s)	389	1st place, gold medalist(s)
South American Games
2018	Cochabamba, Bolivia	85 kg	152	160	~~164~~	2nd place, silver medalist(s)	192	200	~~202~~	2nd place, silver medalist(s)	360	2nd place, silver medalist(s)
2022	Asunción, Paraguay	96 kg	168	174	178	—N/a	204	~~211~~	216	—N/a	394	1st place, gold medalist(s)
Bolivarian Games
2022	Valledupar, Colombia	96 kg	~~167~~	~~167~~	167	2nd place, silver medalist(s)	201	206	210	1st place, gold medalist(s)	—N/a	—N/a
