= Anyelin Venegas =

Venezuelan weightlifter

Anyelin Maria Venegas Valera (born 26 January 1999) is a Venezuelan weightlifter. Representing Venezuela at the 2024 Summer Olympics, Venegas placed fourth in the women's 59kg weightlifting event. She qualified for the Olympics after winning the Pan American Weightlifting Championships in Caracas.
