= Jhohan Sanguino =

Venezuelan weightlifter (born 1998)

Personal information
- Full name: Jhohan David Sanguino Matamoros
- Born: 1 December 1998 (age 27)

Sport
- Country: Venezuela
- Sport: Weightlifting
- Weight class: 109 kg
Medal record
Men's weightlifting
Representing Venezuela
Pan American Games
Bronze medal – third place	2023 Santiago	102 kg
Pan American Championships
Silver medal – second place	2022 Bogotá	109 kg
Bronze medal – third place	2024 Caracas	102 kg
South American Games
Gold medal – first place	2022 Asunción	109 kg
Bolivarian Games
Gold medal – first place	2024 Ayacucho	102 kg
Silver medal – second place	2022 Valledupar	109 kg S
Silver medal – second place	2022 Valledupar	109 kg CJ

Jhohan David Sanguino Matamoros (born 1 December 1998) is a Venezuelan weightlifter. He won the silver medal in the men's 109 kg event at the 2022 Pan American Weightlifting Championships held in Bogotá, Colombia. He won the gold medal in his event at the 2022 South American Games held in Asunción, Paraguay.

Sanguino won two silver medals at the 2022 Bolivarian Games held in Valledupar, Colombia. He won the bronze medal in the men's 102 kg event at the 2023 Pan American Games held in Santiago, Chile.

In 2024, he won the bronze medal in his event at the Pan American Weightlifting Championships held in Caracas, Venezuela. He won the gold medal in his event at the 2024 Bolivarian Games held in Ayacucho, Peru.

In July 2026, Sanguino was issued with a four-year ban backdated to March 2025 for an anti-doping rule violation for testing positive for stanozolol.

== Achievements ==
Year	Venue	Weight	Snatch (kg)				Clean & Jerk (kg)				Total	Rank
Year	Venue	Weight	1	2	3	Rank	1	2	3	Rank	Total	Rank
World Championships
2023	Riyadh, Saudi Arabia	102 kg	~~165~~	~~165~~	~~165~~	—	195	201	207	15	—	—
Pan American Championships
2021	Guayaquil, Ecuador	102 kg	146	~~151~~	~~151~~	9	175	182	~~191~~	8	328	9
2022	Bogotá, Colombia	109 kg	155	162	167	2nd place, silver medalist(s)	185	194	~~202~~	2nd place, silver medalist(s)	361	2nd place, silver medalist(s)
2023	Bariloche, Argentina	102 kg	150	~~157~~	~~157~~	5	181	187	189	3rd place, bronze medalist(s)	339	5
South American Games
2022	Asunción, Paraguay	109 kg	~~163~~	163	168	—N/a	195	~~200~~	~~202~~	—N/a	363	1st place, gold medalist(s)
Bolivarian Games
2022	Valledupar, Colombia	109 kg	155	~~163~~	166	2nd place, silver medalist(s)	185	196	~~203~~	2nd place, silver medalist(s)	—N/a	—N/a
