= Julio Mayora =

Venezuelan weightlifter (born 1996)

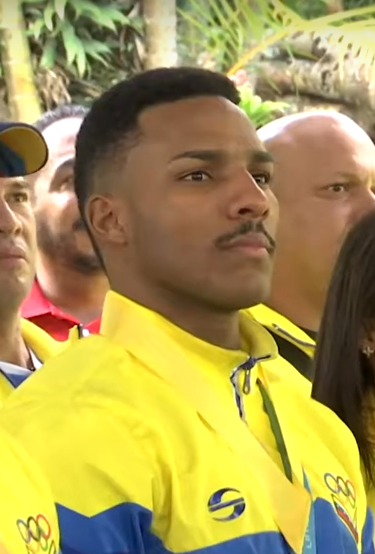
- Mayora in 2019

Personal information
- Full name: Julio Ruben Mayora Pernia
- Born: 2 September 1996 (age 30) Maiquetía, Venezuela
- Weight: 66.63 kg (147 lb)

Sport
- Country: Venezuela
- Sport: Weightlifting
- Events: 73 kg; 79 kg
Medal record
Representing Venezuela
Men's weightlifting
Olympic Games
Silver medal – second place	2020 Tokyo	73 kg
World Championships
Bronze medal – third place	2018 Ashgabat	67 kg
Pan American Games
Gold medal – first place	2019 Lima	73 kg
Gold medal – first place	2023 Santiago	73 kg
Pan American Championships
Gold medal – first place	2018 Santa Domingo	69 kg
Gold medal – first place	2023 Bariloche	73 kg
Gold medal – first place	2025 Cali	79 kg
Silver medal – second place	2017 Miami	69 kg
Silver medal – second place	2020 Santo Domingo	73 kg
Bronze medal – third place	2026 Panama City	79 kg
South American Games
Gold medal – first place	2022 Asunción	73 kg
Central American and Caribbean Games
Gold medal – first place	2018 Barranquilla	69 kg
Gold medal – first place	2026 Santo Domingo	79 kg
Gold medal – first place	2026 Santo Domingo	79 kg
Youth World Championships
Silver medal – second place	2013 Tashkent	56 kg
Pan American Junior Championships
Silver medal – second place	2015 Edmonton	62 kg

Julio Rubén Mayora Pernia (born 2 September 1996) is a Venezuelan weightlifter, Olympian, Pan American Champion and Pan American Games Champion competing in the 69 kg category until 2018 and the 67 kg and 73 kg categories starting in 2018 after the International Weightlifting Federation reorganized the categories.

== Career ==
He participated at the 2018 World Weightlifting Championships, winning a bronze medal with a 322 kg total. At the 2020 Olympic Games in Tokyo he won a silver medal in the 73 kg category, and dedicated it to Hugo Chávez.

In August 2024, Mayora competed in the men's 73 kg event at the 2024 Summer Olympics held in Paris, France. He lifted 152 kg in the Snatch and placed fifth provisionally, but he failed all three attempts in Clean & Jerk. He won the two gold medals in the 79 kg category of the 2026 Central American and Caribbean Games.

== Major results ==
Year	Venue	Weight	Snatch (kg)				Clean & Jerk (kg)				Total	Rank
Year	Venue	Weight	1	2	3	Rank	1	2	3	Rank	Total	Rank
Olympic Games
2020	Tokyo, Japan	73 kg	150	154	156	—N/a	186	190	~~198~~	—N/a	346	2nd place, silver medalist(s)
2024	Paris, France	73 kg	152	~~156~~	~~156~~	—N/a	~~188~~	~~188~~	~~192~~	—N/a	DNF	—
World Championships
2018	Ashgabat, Turkmenistan	67 kg	144	147	~~151~~	3rd place, bronze medalist(s)	175	~~178~~	~~179~~	5	322	3rd place, bronze medalist(s)
2019	Pattaya, Thailand	73 kg	147	152	~~157~~	8	185	~~191~~	~~192~~	6	337	6
2022	Bogotá, Colombia	73 kg	~~148~~	~~150~~	~~153~~	—	—	—	—	—	—	—
2023	Riyadh, Saudi Arabia	73 kg	147	~~150~~	150	7	183	~~187~~	~~187~~	6	333	4
IWF World Cup
2024	Phuket, Thailand	73 kg	147	~~151~~	151	12	183	185	188	7	339	8
Pan American Games
2019	Lima, Peru	73 kg	152	155	~~157~~	—N/a	185	194	~~197~~	—N/a	349	1st place, gold medalist(s)
2023	Santiago, Chile	73 kg	147	151	154	—N/a	182	184	188	—N/a	342	1st place, gold medalist(s)
Pan American Championships
2014	Santo Domingo, Dominican Republic	62 kg	115	118	~~121~~	3rd place, bronze medalist(s)	~~135~~	135	140	8	258	6
2017	Miami, United States	69 kg	135	140	143	2nd place, silver medalist(s)	168	172	~~179~~	2nd place, silver medalist(s)	315	2nd place, silver medalist(s)
2018	Santo Domingo, Dominican Republic	69 kg	140	~~145~~	145	1st place, gold medalist(s)	171	177	180	1st place, gold medalist(s)	325	1st place, gold medalist(s)
2020	Santo Domingo, Dominican Republic	73 kg	145	150	156	1st place, gold medalist(s)	185	~~189~~	~~189~~	2nd place, silver medalist(s)	341	2nd place, silver medalist(s)
2023	Bariloche, Argentina	73 kg	142	~~148~~	148	1st place, gold medalist(s)	180	184	~~188~~	1st place, gold medalist(s)	332	1st place, gold medalist(s)
2024	Caracas, Venezuela	73 kg	147	151	154	1st place, gold medalist(s)	~~184~~	~~184~~	~~184~~	—	—	—
2025	Cali, Colombia	79 kg	150	155	158	2nd place, silver medalist(s)	188	193	199	1st place, gold medalist(s)	357	1st place, gold medalist(s)
2026	Panama City, Panama	79 kg	145	~~150~~	~~151~~	5	186	191	~~197~~	2nd place, silver medalist(s)	336	3rd place, bronze medalist(s)
