= List of Puerto Rican records in Olympic weightlifting =

The following are the records of Puerto Rico in Olympic weightlifting. Records are maintained in each weight class for the snatch lift, clean and jerk lift, and the total for both lifts by the Federación de Levantamiento de Pesas de Puerto Rico, Inc.

== Current records ==
=== Men ===
Event	Record	Athlete	Date	Meet	Place	Ref
60 kg
Snatch	kg					
Clean & Jerk	kg					
Total	kg					
65 kg
Snatch	kg					
Clean & Jerk	156 kg	Luis González	5 August 2026	CAC Games	Santo Domingo, Dominican Republic	
Total	kg					
71 kg
Snatch	kg					
Clean & Jerk	kg					
Total	kg					
79 kg
Snatch	kg					
Clean & Jerk	kg					
Total	kg					
88 kg
Snatch	kg					
Clean & Jerk	kg					
Total	kg					
94 kg
Snatch	kg					
Clean & Jerk	kg					
Total	kg					
110 kg
Snatch	kg					
Clean & Jerk	kg					
Total	kg					
+110 kg
Snatch	kg					
Clean & Jerk	kg					
Total	kg					

=== Women ===
Event	Record	Athlete	Date	Meet	Place	Ref
48 kg
Snatch						
Clean & Jerk						
Total						
53 kg
Snatch	81 kg	Asia González	5 August 2026	CAC Games	Santo Domingo, Dominican Republic	
Clean & Jerk						
Total						

== Historical records ==
=== Men (2018-2025) ===
Event	Record	Athlete	Date	Meet	Place	Ref
55 kg
Snatch	105 kg	Howard Roche	24 June 2023	CAC Games	San Salvador, El Salvador	
Clean & Jerk	125 kg	Howard Roche	18 April 2023	Central American & Caribbean Championships	Santo Domingo, Dominican Republic	
Total	228 kg	Howard Roche	18 April 2023	Central American & Caribbean Championships	Santo Domingo, Dominican Republic	
61 kg
Snatch						
Clean & Jerk						
Total						
67 kg
Snatch	120 kg	Luis González	24 June 2023	CAC Games	San Salvador, El Salvador	
Clean & Jerk	153 kg	Luis González	24 June 2023	CAC Games	San Salvador, El Salvador	
Total	273 kg	Luis González	24 June 2023	CAC Games	San Salvador, El Salvador	
73 kg
Snatch	135 kg	Jorge Sanchez	24 April 2019	Pan American Championships	Guatemala City, Guatemala	
Clean & Jerk	167 kg	Jorge Sanchez	24 April 2019	Pan American Championships	Guatemala City, Guatemala	
Total	302 kg	Jorge Sanchez	24 April 2019	Pan American Championships	Guatemala City, Guatemala	
81 kg
Snatch	145 kg	Alexander Hernandez	25 April 2019	Pan American Championships	Guatemala City, Guatemala	
Clean & Jerk	182 kg	Alexander Hernandez	25 April 2019	Pan American Championships	Guatemala City, Guatemala	
Total	327 kg	Alexander Hernandez	25 April 2019	Pan American Championships	Guatemala City, Guatemala	
89 kg
Snatch	142 kg	Yomar López	14 June 2023	IWF Grand Prix	Havana, Cuba	
Clean & Jerk	163 kg	Yomar López	10 September 2023	World Championships	Riyadh, Saudi Arabia	
Total	301 kg	Yomar López	20 April 2023	Central American & Caribbean Championships	Santo Domingo, Dominican Republic	
96 kg
Snatch	145 kg	Luis Lamenza	29 July 2019	Pan American Games	Lima, Peru	
Clean & Jerk	180 kg	Keven Morales	21 April 2023	Central American & Caribbean Championships	Santo Domingo, Dominican Republic	
Total	320 kg	Luis Lamenza	29 July 2019	Pan American Games	Lima, Peru	
102 kg
Snatch	157 kg	Luis Lamenza	November 2021	Pan American Championships	Guayaquil, Ecuador	
Clean & Jerk	191 kg	Luis Lamenza	23 April 2021	Pan American Championships	Santo Domingo, Dominican Republic	
Total	342 kg	Luis Lamenza	23 April 2021	Pan American Championships	Santo Domingo, Dominican Republic	
109 kg
Snatch	158 kg	Luis Lamenza	27 June 2023	CAC Games	San Salvador, El Salvador	
Clean & Jerk	180 kg	Luis Lamenza	27 June 2023	CAC Games	San Salvador, El Salvador	
Total	338 kg	Luis Lamenza	27 June 2023	CAC Games	San Salvador, El Salvador	
+109 kg
Snatch	122 kg	Jose Camacho	24 April 2021	Pan American Championships	Santo Domingo, Dominican Republic	
Clean & Jerk	150 kg	Jose Camacho	24 April 2021	Pan American Championships	Santo Domingo, Dominican Republic	
Total	272 kg	Jose Camacho	24 April 2021	Pan American Championships	Santo Domingo, Dominican Republic	

=== Women (2018-2025) ===
Event	Record	Athlete	Date	Meet	Place	Ref
45 kg
Snatch						
Clean & Jerk						
Total						
49 kg
Snatch	68 kg	Lely Burgos	April 2019	Pan American Championships	Guatemala City, Guatemala	
Clean & Jerk	88 kg	Lely Burgos	April 2019	Pan American Championships	Guatemala City, Guatemala	
Total	156 kg	Lely Burgos	April 2019	Pan American Championships	Guatemala City, Guatemala	
55 kg
Snatch	80 kg	Gilyeliz Guzmán	24 April 2019	Pan American Championships	Guatemala City, Guatemala	
Clean & Jerk	100 kg	Gilyeliz Guzmán	28 July 2019	Pan American Games	Lima, Peru	
Total	180 kg	Gilyeliz Guzmán	28 July 2019	Pan American Games	Lima, Peru	
59 kg
Snatch	89 kg	Gilyeliz Guzmán	11 December 2021	World Championships	Tashkent, Uzbekistan	
Clean & Jerk	115 kg	Gilyeliz Guzmán	November 2021	Pan American Championships	Guayaquil, Ecuador	
Total	203 kg	Gilyeliz Guzmán	November 2021	Pan American Championships	Guayaquil, Ecuador	
64 kg
Snatch	89 kg	Casey Aguilar	20 April 2023	Central American & Caribbean Championships	Santo Domingo, Dominican Republic	
Clean & Jerk	114 kg	Flavia Reyes	April 2019	Pan American Championships	Guatemala City, Guatemala	
Total	199 kg	Flavia Reyes	April 2019	Pan American Championships	Guatemala City, Guatemala	
71 kg
Snatch	94 kg	Kidaisha Lopez	26 June 2023	CAC Games	San Salvador, El Salvador	
Clean & Jerk	116 kg	Kidaisha Lopez	26 June 2023	CAC Games	San Salvador, El Salvador	
Total	210 kg	Kidaisha Lopez	26 June 2023	CAC Games	San Salvador, El Salvador	
76 kg
Snatch	88 kg	Kidaisha Lopez	22 April 2021	Pan American Championships	Santo Domingo, Dominican Republic	
Clean & Jerk	113 kg	Kidaisha Lopez	22 April 2021	Pan American Championships	Santo Domingo, Dominican Republic	
Total	201 kg	Kidaisha Lopez	22 April 2021	Pan American Championships	Santo Domingo, Dominican Republic	
81 kg
Snatch						
Clean & Jerk						
Total						
87 kg
Snatch	96 kg	Keyshla Rodriguez	April 2019	Pan American Championships	Guatemala City, Guatemala	
Clean & Jerk	122 kg	Keyshla Rodriguez	April 2019	Pan American Championships	Guatemala City, Guatemala	
Total	218 kg	Keyshla Rodriguez	April 2019	Pan American Championships	Guatemala City, Guatemala	
+87 kg
Snatch						
Clean & Jerk						
Total						
