= List of Vincentian records in Olympic weightlifting =

The following are the records of Saint Vincent and the Grenadines in Olympic weightlifting. Records are maintained in each weight class for the snatch lift, clean and jerk lift, and the total for both lifts by the St. Vincent Amateur Weightlifting Association.

== Men ==
Event	Record	Athlete	Date	Meet	Place	Ref
55 kg
Snatch						
Clean and Jerk						
Total						
61 kg
Snatch						
Clean & Jerk						
Total						
67 kg
Snatch						
Clean & Jerk						
Total						
73 kg
Snatch						
Clean and Jerk						
Total						
81 kg
Snatch						
Clean and Jerk						
Total						
89 kg
Snatch						
Clean and Jerk						
Total						
96 kg
Snatch						
Clean and Jerk						
Total						
102 kg
Snatch						
Clean and Jerk						
Total						
109 kg
Snatch						
Clean and Jerk						
Total						
+109 kg
Snatch						
Clean and Jerk						
Total						

== Women ==
Event	Record	Athlete	Date	Meet	Place	Ref
45 kg
Snatch						
Clean and Jerk						
Total						
49 kg
Snatch						
Clean and Jerk						
Total						
55 kg
Snatch						
Clean and Jerk						
Total						
59 kg
Snatch						
Clean & Jerk						
Total						
64 kg
Snatch						
Clean and Jerk						
Total						
71 kg
Snatch						
Clean and Jerk						
Total						
76 kg
Snatch	88 kg	Rayen Cupid	April 2019	Pan American Championships	Guatemala City, Guatemala	
Clean and Jerk	109 kg	Rayen Cupid	April 2019	Pan American Championships	Guatemala City, Guatemala	
Total	197 kg	Rayen Cupid	April 2019	Pan American Championships	Guatemala City, Guatemala	
81 kg
Snatch	88 kg	Rayen Cupid	23 April 2021	Pan American Championships	Santo Domingo, Dominican Republic	
Clean and Jerk	107 kg	Rayen Cupid	23 April 2021	Pan American Championships	Santo Domingo, Dominican Republic	
Total	195 kg	Rayen Cupid	23 April 2021	Pan American Championships	Santo Domingo, Dominican Republic	
87 kg
Snatch						
Clean and Jerk						
Total						
+87 kg
Snatch						
Clean and Jerk						
Total						
