= List of Guatemalan records in Olympic weightlifting =

The following are the records of Guatemala in Olympic weightlifting. Records are maintained in each weight class for the snatch lift, clean and jerk lift, and the total for both lifts by the Federación Nacional de Levantamiento de Pesas de Guatemala (FEDEPESAS).

== Men ==
Event	Record	Athlete	Date	Meet	Place	Ref
55 kg
Snatch	96 kg	José Ical	24 June 2023	CAC Games	San Salvador, El Salvador	
Clean & Jerk	120 kg	José Ical	23 April 2019	Pan American Championships	Guatemala City, Guatemala	
Total	215 kg	José Ical	23 April 2019	Pan American Championships	Guatemala City, Guatemala	
61 kg
Snatch	105 kg	Dario Cruz	23 April 2019	Pan American Championships	Guatemala City, Guatemala	
Clean & Jerk	144 kg	Henry Esquivel	18 April 2023	Central American & Caribbean Championships	Santo Domingo, Dominican Republic	
Total	249 kg	Henry Esquivel	18 April 2023	Central American & Caribbean Championships	Santo Domingo, Dominican Republic	
67 kg
Snatch	135 kg	Edgar Pineda	20 April 2021	Pan American Championships	Santo Domingo, Dominican Republic	
Clean & Jerk	172 kg	Edgar Pineda	20 April 2021	Pan American Championships	Santo Domingo, Dominican Republic	
Total	307 kg	Edgar Pineda	20 April 2021	Pan American Championships	Santo Domingo, Dominican Republic	
73 kg
Snatch	127 kg	Óscar Valdizón	28 July 2019	Pan American Games	Lima, Peru	
Clean & Jerk	165 kg	Óscar Valdizón	28 July 2019	Pan American Games	Lima, Peru	
Total	292 kg	Óscar Valdizón	28 July 2019	Pan American Games	Lima, Peru	
81 kg
Snatch	125 kg	Jaime Leon de Paz	21 April 2021	Pan American Championships	Santo Domingo, Dominican Republic	
Clean & Jerk	160 kg	Jaime Leon de Paz	21 April 2021	Pan American Championships	Santo Domingo, Dominican Republic	
Total	285 kg	Jaime Leon de Paz	21 April 2021	Pan American Championships	Santo Domingo, Dominican Republic	
89 kg
Snatch	125 kg	Jaime Leon de Paz	14 June 2023	IWF Grand Prix	Havana, Cuba	
Clean & Jerk	154 kg	Jaime Leon de Paz	14 June 2023	IWF Grand Prix	Havana, Cuba	
Total	279 kg	Jaime Leon de Paz	14 June 2023	IWF Grand Prix	Havana, Cuba	
96 kg
Snatch	135 kg	Javier Castillo	26 April 2019	Pan American Championships	Guatemala City, Guatemala	
Clean & Jerk	170 kg	Javier Castillo	26 April 2019	Pan American Championships	Guatemala City, Guatemala	
Total	305 kg	Javier Castillo	26 April 2019	Pan American Championships	Guatemala City, Guatemala	
102 kg
Snatch	127 kg	Sender Maquin	26 April 2019	Pan American Championships	Guatemala City, Guatemala	
Clean & Jerk	162 kg	Sender Maquin	26 April 2019	Pan American Championships	Guatemala City, Guatemala	
Total	289 kg	Sender Maquin	26 April 2019	Pan American Championships	Guatemala City, Guatemala	
109 kg
Snatch	125 kg	Marlon Queme	26 April 2019	Pan American Championships	Guatemala City, Guatemala	
Clean & Jerk	165 kg	Sender Maquin	24 April 2021	Pan American Championships	Santo Domingo, Dominican Republic	
Total	280 kg	Marlon Queme	26 April 2019	Pan American Championships	Guatemala City, Guatemala	
+109 kg
Snatch	175 kg	Gilberto Lemus	24 April 2021	Pan American Championships	Santo Domingo, Dominican Republic	
Clean & Jerk	205 kg	Gilberto Lemus	30 July 2019	Pan American Games	Lima, Peru	
Total	379 kg	Gilberto Lemus	24 April 2021	Pan American Championships	Santo Domingo, Dominican Republic	

== Women ==
Event	Record	Athlete	Date	Meet	Place	Ref
45 kg
Snatch	63 kg	Silvana Gonzalez	19 April 2021	Pan American Championships	Santo Domingo, Dominican Republic	
Clean and Jerk	78 kg	Silvana Gonzalez	19 April 2021	Pan American Championships	Santo Domingo, Dominican Republic	
Total	141 kg	Silvana Gonzalez	19 April 2021	Pan American Championships	Santo Domingo, Dominican Republic	
49 kg
Snatch	73 kg	Margoth Reynoso	April 2019	Pan American Championships	Guatemala City, Guatemala	
Clean and Jerk	91 kg	Margoth Reynoso	April 2019	Pan American Championships	Guatemala City, Guatemala	
Total	164 kg	Margoth Reynoso	April 2019	Pan American Championships	Guatemala City, Guatemala	
55 kg
Snatch	74 kg	Mahli Ramos	20 April 2021	Pan American Championships	Santo Domingo, Dominican Republic	
Clean and Jerk	98 kg	Mahli Ramos	20 April 2021	Pan American Championships	Santo Domingo, Dominican Republic	
Total	172 kg	Mahli Ramos	20 April 2021	Pan American Championships	Santo Domingo, Dominican Republic	
59 kg
Snatch	71 kg	Santos González	April 2019	Pan American Championships	Guatemala City, Guatemala	
Clean & Jerk	94 kg	Santos González	21 April 2021	Pan American Championships	Santo Domingo, Dominican Republic	
Total	165 kg	Santos González	21 April 2021	Pan American Championships	Santo Domingo, Dominican Republic	
64 kg
Snatch	80 kg	Lesbia Cruz	April 2019	Pan American Championships	Guatemala City, Guatemala	
Clean and Jerk	108 kg	Lesbia Cruz	29 July 2019	Pan American Games	Lima, Peru	
Total	188 kg	Lesbia Cruz	29 July 2019	Pan American Games	Lima, Peru	
71 kg
Snatch	75 kg	Jessica González	April 2019	Pan American Championships	Guatemala City, Guatemala	
Clean and Jerk	100 kg	Lesbia Cruz	26 June 2023	CAC Games	San Salvador, El Salvador	
Total	175 kg	Lesbia Cruz	26 June 2023	CAC Games	San Salvador, El Salvador	
76 kg
Snatch	80 kg	Azucena Gonzalez	April 2019	Pan American Championships	Guatemala City, Guatemala	
Clean and Jerk	105 kg	Maria Maldonado	22 April 2021	Pan American Championships	Santo Domingo, Dominican Republic	
Total	175 kg	Azucena Gonzalez	April 2019	Pan American Championships	Guatemala City, Guatemala	
81 kg
Snatch	73 kg	Beverly de Leon	14 June 2023	IWF Grand Prix	Havana, Cuba	
Clean and Jerk	100 kg	Ogla Ruano	April 2019	Pan American Championships	Guatemala City, Guatemala	
Total	170 kg	Beverly de Leon	14 June 2023	IWF Grand Prix	Havana, Cuba	
87 kg
Snatch	75 kg	Maritza Chuta	23 April 2021	Pan American Championships	Santo Domingo, Dominican Republic	
Clean and Jerk	98 kg	Beverly de León	26 June 2023	CAC Games	San Salvador, El Salvador	
Total	172 kg	Beverly de León	26 June 2023	CAC Games	San Salvador, El Salvador	
+87 kg
Snatch	91 kg	Scarleth Ucelo	27 June 2023	CAC Games	San Salvador, El Salvador	
Clean and Jerk	126 kg	Scarleth Ucelo	14 June 2023	IWF Grand Prix	Havana, Cuba	
Total	216 kg	Scarleth Ucelo	14 June 2023	IWF Grand Prix	Havana, Cuba	
