= List of Panamanian records in Olympic weightlifting =

The following are the records of Panama in Olympic weightlifting. Records are maintained in each weight class for the snatch lift, clean and jerk lift, and the total for both lifts by the Federación Panamena de Levantamiento de Pesas.

== Men ==
Event	Record	Athlete	Date	Meet	Place	Ref
55 kg
Snatch	96 kg	Juan Martínez	19 April 2021	Pan American Championships	Santo Domingo, Dominican Republic	
Clean & Jerk	113 kg	Juan Martínez	19 April 2021	Pan American Championships	Santo Domingo, Dominican Republic	
Total	209 kg	Juan Martínez	19 April 2021	Pan American Championships	Santo Domingo, Dominican Republic	
61 kg
Snatch	110 kg	Ronnier Martinez	19 April 2021	Pan American Championships	Santo Domingo, Dominican Republic	
Clean & Jerk	140 kg	Ronnier Martinez	19 April 2021	Pan American Championships	Santo Domingo, Dominican Republic	
Total	250 kg	Ronnier Martinez	19 April 2021	Pan American Championships	Santo Domingo, Dominican Republic	
67 kg
Snatch	115 kg	Ronnier Martinez	April 2019	Pan American Championships	Guatemala City, Guatemala	
Clean & Jerk	146 kg	Ronnier Martinez	April 2019	Pan American Championships	Guatemala City, Guatemala	
Total	261 kg	Ronnier Martinez	April 2019	Pan American Championships	Guatemala City, Guatemala	
73 kg
Snatch	121 kg	Juan Batista	21 April 2021	Pan American Championships	Santo Domingo, Dominican Republic	
Clean & Jerk	145 kg	Ronnier Martínez	25 February 2024	Pan American Championships	Caracas, Venezuela	
Total	265 kg	Ronnier Martínez	25 February 2024	Pan American Championships	Caracas, Venezuela	
81 kg
Snatch	130 kg	Eustaciano Arías	28 July 2019	Pan American Games	Lima, Peru	
Clean & Jerk	155 kg	Eustaciano Arías	28 July 2019	Pan American Games	Lima, Peru	
Total	285 kg	Eustaciano Arías	28 July 2019	Pan American Games	Lima, Peru	
89 kg
Snatch						
Clean & Jerk						
Total						
96 kg
Snatch	127 kg	Amilcar Araujo	23 April 2021	Pan American Championships	Santo Domingo, Dominican Republic	
Clean & Jerk	160 kg	Amilcar Araujo	23 April 2021	Pan American Championships	Santo Domingo, Dominican Republic	
Total	287 kg	Amilcar Araujo	23 April 2021	Pan American Championships	Santo Domingo, Dominican Republic	
102 kg
Snatch	140 kg	Mario Martínez	23 April 2021	Pan American Championships	Santo Domingo, Dominican Republic	
Clean & Jerk	175 kg	Mario Martínez	23 April 2021	Pan American Championships	Santo Domingo, Dominican Republic	
Total	315 kg	Mario Martínez	23 April 2021	Pan American Championships	Santo Domingo, Dominican Republic	
109 kg
Snatch						
Clean & Jerk						
Total						
+109 kg
Snatch	110 kg	Juan Leon	24 April 2021	Pan American Championships	Santo Domingo, Dominican Republic	
Clean & Jerk						
Total						

== Women ==
Event	Record	Athlete	Date	Meet	Place	Ref
45 kg
Snatch						
Clean & Jerk						
Total						
49 kg
Snatch	70 kg	Erika Ortega	27 July 2019	Pan American Games	Lima, Peru	
Clean & Jerk	84 kg	Erika Ortega	April 2019	Pan American Championships	Guatemala City, Guatemala	
Total	153 kg	Erika Ortega	27 July 2019	Pan American Games	Lima, Peru	
55 kg
Snatch	68 kg	Beatriz Oduber	24 June 2023	CAC Games	San Salvador, El Salvador	
Clean & Jerk	86 kg	Beatriz Oduber	24 June 2023	CAC Games	San Salvador, El Salvador	
Total	154 kg	Beatriz Oduber	24 June 2023	CAC Games	San Salvador, El Salvador	
59 kg
Snatch						
Clean & Jerk						
Total						
64 kg
Snatch						
Clean & Jerk						
Total						
71 kg
Snatch	80 kg	Kelly Aparicio	3 May 2025	World Junior Championships	Lima, Peru	
Clean & Jerk	104 kg	Kelly Aparicio	3 May 2025	World Junior Championships	Lima, Peru	
Total	184 kg	Kelly Aparicio	3 May 2025	World Junior Championships	Lima, Peru	
76 kg
Snatch						
Clean & Jerk						
Total						
81 kg
Snatch						
Clean & Jerk						
Total						
87 kg
Snatch						
Clean & Jerk						
Total						
+87 kg
Snatch	90 kg	Mariadni Batista	27 June 2023	CAC Games	San Salvador, El Salvador	
Clean & Jerk	115 kg	Mariadni Batista	27 June 2023	CAC Games	San Salvador, El Salvador	
Total	205 kg	Mariadni Batista	27 June 2023	CAC Games	San Salvador, El Salvador	
