= List of Haitian records in Olympic weightlifting =

The following are the records of Haiti in Olympic weightlifting. Records are maintained in each weight class for the snatch lift, clean and jerk lift, and the total for both lifts by the Fédération Haitienne d'Haltérophilie M.C.

== Men ==
Event	Record	Athlete	Date	Meet	Place	Ref
55 kg
Snatch	100 kg	Edouard Joseph	23 April 2019	Pan American Championships	Guatemala City, Guatemala	
Clean & Jerk						
Total						
61 kg
Snatch						
Clean & Jerk						
Total						
67 kg
Snatch						
Clean & Jerk						
Total						
73 kg
Snatch	101 kg	Dieuly Plaisir	19 April 2023	Central American & Caribbean Championships	Santo Domingo, Dominican Republic	
Clean & Jerk	127 kg	Dieuly Plaisir	19 April 2023	Central American & Caribbean Championships	Santo Domingo, Dominican Republic	
Total	228 kg	Dieuly Plaisir	19 April 2023	Central American & Caribbean Championships	Santo Domingo, Dominican Republic	
81 kg
Snatch						
Clean & Jerk						
Total						
89 kg
Snatch						
Clean & Jerk						
Total						
96 kg
Snatch	124 kg	Gladimyr Coffy	26 June 2023	CAC Games	San Salvador, El Salvador	
Clean & Jerk	150 kg	Gladimyr Coffy	26 June 2023	CAC Games	San Salvador, El Salvador	
Total	274 kg	Gladimyr Coffy	26 June 2023	CAC Games	San Salvador, El Salvador	
102 kg
Snatch	137 kg	Junior Perez	23 April 2021	Pan American Championships	Santo Domingo, Dominican Republic	
Clean & Jerk	164 kg	Junior Perez	23 April 2021	Pan American Championships	Santo Domingo, Dominican Republic	
Total	301 kg	Junior Perez	23 April 2021	Pan American Championships	Santo Domingo, Dominican Republic	
109 kg
Snatch						
Clean & Jerk						
Total						
+109 kg
Snatch						
Clean & Jerk						
Total						

== Women ==
Event	Record	Athlete	Date	Meet	Place	Ref
45 kg
Snatch						
Clean and Jerk						
Total						
49 kg
Snatch						
Clean and Jerk						
Total						
55 kg
Snatch	75 kg	Viollanda Oracin	24 June 2023	CAC Games	San Salvador, El Salvador	
Clean and Jerk	97 kg	Viollanda Oracin	24 June 2023	CAC Games	San Salvador, El Salvador	
Total	172 kg	Viollanda Oracin	24 June 2023	CAC Games	San Salvador, El Salvador	
59 kg
Snatch						
Clean & Jerk						
Total						
64 kg
Snatch						
Clean and Jerk						
Total						
71 kg
Snatch	81 kg	Francia Louis	26 June 2023	CAC Games	San Salvador, El Salvador	
Clean and Jerk	97 kg	Francia Louis	26 June 2023	CAC Games	San Salvador, El Salvador	
Total	178 kg	Francia Louis	26 June 2023	CAC Games	San Salvador, El Salvador	
76 kg
Snatch	90 kg	Ketlene Primot	26 June 2023	CAC Games	San Salvador, El Salvador	
Clean and Jerk	110 kg	Ketlene Primot	26 June 2023	CAC Games	San Salvador, El Salvador	
Total	200 kg	Ketlene Primot	26 June 2023	CAC Games	San Salvador, El Salvador	
81 kg
Snatch	90 kg	Ketlene Primot	22 April 2023	Central American & Caribbean Championships	Santo Domingo, Dominican Republic	
Clean and Jerk	112 kg	Ketlene Primot	22 April 2023	Central American & Caribbean Championships	Santo Domingo, Dominican Republic	
Total	202 kg	Ketlene Primot	22 April 2023	Central American & Caribbean Championships	Santo Domingo, Dominican Republic	
87 kg
Snatch						
Clean and Jerk						
Total						
+87 kg
Snatch						
Clean and Jerk						
Total						
