= Génesis Rodríguez (weightlifter) =

Venezuelan weightlifter (born 1994)

Personal information
- Full name: Génesis Lourdes Rodríguez Gómez
- Born: 17 July 1994 (age 32)
- Weight: 52.90 kg (116.6 lb)

Sport
- Country: Venezuela
- Sport: Weightlifting
- Team: National team
Medal record
Representing Venezuela
Women's weightlifting
Pan American Games
Gold medal – first place	2019 Lima	55 kg
Silver medal – second place	2015 Toronto	53 kg
Pan American Championships
Disqualified	2016 Cartagena	53 kg
Silver medal – second place	2020 Santo Domingo	55 kg
Silver medal – second place	2024 Caracas	59 kg
Bronze medal – third place	2021 Guayaquil	55 kg
South American Games
Silver medal – second place	2022 Asunción	59 kg
Bolivarian Games
Gold medal – first place	2022 Valledupar	55 kg S
Gold medal – first place	2022 Valledupar	55 kg CJ

Génesis Lourdes Rodríguez Gómez (born 17 July 1994) is a Venezuelan weightlifter, competing in the 53 kg category and representing Venezuela at international competitions.

She competed at world championships, including at the 2015 World Weightlifting Championships.

She won the silver medal in her event at the 2022 South American Games held in Asunción, Paraguay.

In 2024, she won the silver medal in the women's 59 kg event at the Pan American Weightlifting Championships held in Caracas, Venezuela.

== Major results ==
Year	Venue	Weight	Snatch (kg)				Clean & Jerk (kg)				Total	Rank
Year	Venue	Weight	1	2	3	Rank	1	2	3	Rank	Total	Rank
World Championships
2015	Houston, United States	53 kg	~~87~~	~~87~~	87	10	105	~~109~~	~~109~~	18	192	11
