= Arley Calderón =

Cuban weightlifter (born 1999)

Personal information
- Full name: Arley Lázaro Calderón Licourt
- Born: 26 February 1999 (age 27)

Sport
- Country: Cuba
- Sport: Weightlifting
- Weight class: 61 kg
Medal record
Men's weightlifting
Representing Cuba
Pan American Games
Gold medal – first place	2023 Santiago	61 kg
Pan American Championships
Silver medal – second place	2022 Bogotá	61 kg
Silver medal – second place	2023 Bariloche	61 kg
Bronze medal – third place	2020 Santo Domingo	61 kg
Central American and Caribbean Games
Gold medal – first place	2023 San Salvador	61 kg CJ
Bronze medal – third place	2023 San Salvador	61 kg S

Arley Lázaro Calderón Licourt (born 26 February 1999) is a Cuban weightlifter. He won the gold medal in the men's 61 kg event at the 2023 Pan American Games held in Santiago, Chile. Calderón has also won medals at multiple editions of the Pan American Weightlifting Championships.

Calderón won two medals, including gold, at the 2023 Central American and Caribbean Games held in San Salvador, El Salvador. He won the gold medal in the men's 61 kg Clean & Jerk event and the bronze medal in the men's 61 kg Snatch event.

== Achievements ==
Year	Venue	Weight	Snatch (kg)				Clean & Jerk (kg)				Total	Rank
Year	Venue	Weight	1	2	3	Rank	1	2	3	Rank	Total	Rank
World Championships
2019	Pattaya, Thailand	61 kg	~~114~~	~~114~~	114	24	~~146~~	~~146~~	146	22	260	22
2022	Bogotá, Colombia	61 kg	~~120~~	120	~~123~~	14	155	160	~~162~~	6	280	11
2023	Riyadh, Saudi Arabia	61 kg	121	~~126~~	126	14	156	162	165	6	291	10
2024	Manama, Bahrain	61 kg	116	~~121~~	~~121~~	12	~~158~~	~~158~~	~~158~~	—	—	—
Pan American Games
2019	Lima, Peru	61 kg	115	~~120~~	~~120~~	—N/a	150	155	~~160~~	—N/a	270	6
2023	Santiago, Chile	61 kg	~~122~~	122	125	—N/a	154	—	—	—N/a	279	1st place, gold medalist(s)
Pan American Championships
2019	Guatemala City, Guatemala	61 kg	110	115	119	4	145	150	~~154~~	3rd place, bronze medalist(s)	269	4
2020	Santo Domingo, Dominican Republic	61 kg	114	119	~~123~~	4	150	155	~~159~~	3rd place, bronze medalist(s)	274	3rd place, bronze medalist(s)
2022	Bogotá, Colombia	61 kg	~~117~~	117	~~121~~	4	150	155	158	2nd place, silver medalist(s)	275	2nd place, silver medalist(s)
2023	Bariloche, Argentina	61 kg	120	~~124~~	~~124~~	5	~~155~~	155	~~162~~	2nd place, silver medalist(s)	275	2nd place, silver medalist(s)
