= Jhony Arteaga =

Ecuadorian weightlifter (born 2001)

Personal information
- Full name: Jhony David Arteaga Castillo
- Born: 29 July 2001 (age 24)

Sport
- Country: Ecuador
- Sport: Weightlifting
- Weight class: 55 kg
Medal record
Men's weightlifting
Representing Ecuador
Pan American Championships
| Silver medal – second place | 2023 Bariloche | 55 kg |
Bolivarian Games
| Silver medal – second place | 2022 Valledupar | 55 kg S |
| Bronze medal – third place | 2022 Valledupar | 55 kg CJ |

Jhony David Arteaga Castillo (born 29 July 2001) is an Ecuadorian weightlifter. He won the silver medal in his event at the 2023 Pan American Weightlifting Championships held in Bariloche, Argentina. He also won two medals at the 2022 Bolivarian Games held in Valledupar, Colombia.

== Achievements ==
| Year | Venue | Weight | Snatch (kg) | | | | Clean & Jerk (kg) | | | | Total | Rank |
| Year | Venue | Weight | 1 | 2 | 3 | Rank | 1 | 2 | 3 | Rank | Total | Rank |
World Championships
| 2022 | Bogotá, Colombia | 55 kg | 100 | 104 | ~~106~~ | 12 | 120 | 125 | ~~127~~ | 11 | 229 | 11 |
Pan American Championships
| 2022 | Bogotá, Colombia | 55 kg | 96 | 101 | 103 | 3rd place, bronze medalist(s) | 120 | 124 | ~~127~~ | 4 | 227 | 4 |
| 2023 | Bariloche, Argentina | 55 kg | ~~100~~ | 100 | 102 | 2nd place, silver medalist(s) | 120 | 124 | 126 | 4 | 228 | 2nd place, silver medalist(s) |
Bolivarian Games
| 2022 | Valledupar, Colombia | 55 kg | 93 | 96 | 98 | 2nd place, silver medalist(s) | 120 | ~~127~~ | ~~128~~ | 3rd place, bronze medalist(s) | —N/a | —N/a |
