= Jacob Horst =

American weightlifter (born 1997)

Jacob Christian Horst
Personal information
- Nationality: United States
- Born: July 15, 1997 (age 29)
- Weight: 72.10 kg (159 lb)

Sport
- Country: United States of America
- Sport: Weightlifting
- Event: 73 kg
Medal record
Representing United States
Pan American Championships
Bronze medal – third place	2021 Guayaquil	–73 kg

Jacob Christian Horst (born 15 July 1997) is an American weightlifter, competing in the 73 kg category. He won a bronze medal at the 2021 Pan American Weightlifting Championships.

== Major results ==
Year	Venue	Weight	Snatch (kg)				Clean & Jerk (kg)				Total	Rank
Year	Venue	Weight	1	2	3	Rank	1	2	3	Rank	Total	Rank
Representing United States
World Championships
2021	Tashkent, Uzbekistan	73 kg	132	136	~~139~~	11	161	165	~~168~~	12	301	11
Pan American Championships
2021	Guayaquil, Ecuador	73 kg	129	132	137	2nd place, silver medalist(s)	159	163	~~167~~	3rd place, bronze medalist(s)	300	3rd place, bronze medalist(s)
