= Bella Paredes =

Ecuadorian weightlifter (born 2002)

Personal information
- Full name: Bella Nancy Paredes Arreaga
- Born: 25 February 2002 (age 24)

Sport
- Country: Ecuador
- Sport: Weightlifting
- Weight class: 76 kg
Medal record
Women's weightlifting
Representing Ecuador
World Championships
| Bronze medal – third place | 2023 Riyadh | 76 kg |
Pan American Championships
| Silver medal – second place | 2023 Bariloche | 76 kg |
Bolivarian Games
| Silver medal – second place | 2022 Valledupar | 76 kg S |
| Silver medal – second place | 2022 Valledupar | 76 kg CJ |
Junior World Championships
| Gold medal – first place | 2022 Heraklion | 76 kg |
| Silver medal – second place | 2021 Tashkent | 76 kg |
Junior Pan American Games
| Gold medal – first place | 2021 Cali-Valle | 87 kg |
Youth World Championships
| Bronze medal – third place | 2019 Las Vegas | 76 kg |

Bella Nancy Paredes Arreaga (born 25 February 2002) is an Ecuadorian weightlifter. She won the bronze medal in the women's 76 kg event at the 2023 World Weightlifting Championships held in Riyadh, Saudi Arabia. She won two silver medals at the 2022 Bolivarian Games held in Valledupar, Colombia. She is also a former artistic gymnast.

== Career ==
Paredes competed in the girls' +63 kg event at the 2018 Summer Youth Olympics held in Buenos Aires, Argentina. She finished in 4th place. At the time, she finished in 5th place but Supatchanin Khamhaeng of Thailand was stripped of her gold medal after testing positive for a banned substance. Paredes won the bronze medal in the women's 76 kg event at the 2019 Youth World Weightlifting Championships held in Las Vegas, United States.

In 2021, Paredes won the silver medal in the women's 76 kg event at the Junior World Weightlifting Championships held in Tashkent, Uzbekistan. She won the gold medal in the women's 87 kg event at the 2021 Junior Pan American Games held in Cali and Valle, Colombia.

Paredes won the gold medal in the women's 76 kg event at the 2022 Junior World Weightlifting Championships held in Heraklion, Greece. She won two silver medals at the 2022 Bolivarian Games held in Valledupar, Colombia. She won the bronze medal in the women's 76 kg Snatch event at the 2022 World Weightlifting Championships held in Bogotá, Colombia.

Paredes won the silver medal in the women's 76 kg event at the 2023 Pan American Weightlifting Championships held in Bariloche, Argentina. She also won the silver medal in the Snatch and Clean & Jerk events. In that same year, Paredes won the bronze medal in the women's 76 kg event at the 2023 World Weightlifting Championships held in Riyadh, Saudi Arabia.

Paredes competed in artistic gymnastics before switching to weightlifting.

== Achievements ==
| Year | Venue | Weight | Snatch (kg) | | | | Clean & Jerk (kg) | | | | Total | Rank |
| Year | Venue | Weight | 1 | 2 | 3 | Rank | 1 | 2 | 3 | Rank | Total | Rank |
World Championships
| 2022 | Bogotá, Colombia | 76 kg | 101 | 105 | 108 | 3rd place, bronze medalist(s) | 130 | ~~134~~ | ~~135~~ | 6 | 238 | 5 |
| 2023 | Riyadh, Saudi Arabia | 76 kg | ~~105~~ | 105 | ~~107~~ | 4 | 131 | 135 | ~~137~~ | 3rd place, bronze medalist(s) | 240 | 3rd place, bronze medalist(s) |
| 2024 | Manama, Bahrain | 76 kg | 105 | ~~110~~ | ~~111~~ | 4 | 131 | 136 | ~~138~~ | 3rd place, bronze medalist(s) | 241 | 4 |
Pan American Championships
| 2023 | Bariloche, Argentina | 76 kg | 100 | 105 | ~~107~~ | 2nd place, silver medalist(s) | 127 | 132 | ~~134~~ | 2nd place, silver medalist(s) | 237 | 2nd place, silver medalist(s) |
Bolivarian Games
| 2022 | Valledupar, Colombia | 76 kg | 98 | 102 | 105 | 2nd place, silver medalist(s) | 126 | ~~131~~ | 131 | 2nd place, silver medalist(s) | —N/a | —N/a |
