= List of Guyanese records in Olympic weightlifting =

The following are the records of Guyana in Olympic weightlifting. Records are maintained in each weight class for the snatch lift, clean and jerk lift, and the total for both lifts by the Guyana Amateur Weightlifting Association.

== Men ==
Event	Record	Athlete	Date	Meet	Place	Ref
55 kg
Snatch						
Clean & Jerk						
Total						
61 kg
Snatch						
Clean & Jerk						
Total						
67 kg
Snatch						
Clean & Jerk						
Total						
73 kg
Snatch						
Clean & Jerk						
Total						
81 kg
Snatch	95 kg	Shammah Noel	25 June 2023	CAC Games	San Salvador, El Salvador	
Clean & Jerk	141 kg	Shammah Noel	25 June 2023	CAC Games	San Salvador, El Salvador	
Total	236 kg	Shammah Noel	25 June 2023	CAC Games	San Salvador, El Salvador	
89 kg
Snatch						
Clean & Jerk						
Total						
96 kg
Snatch						
Clean & Jerk						
Total						
102 kg
Snatch						
Clean & Jerk						
Total						
109 kg
Snatch						
Clean & Jerk						
Total						
+109 kg
Snatch						
Clean & Jerk						
Total						

== Women ==
Event	Record	Athlete	Date	Meet	Place	Ref
45 kg
Snatch						
Clean and Jerk						
Total						
49 kg
Snatch						
Clean and Jerk						
Total						
55 kg
Snatch						
Clean and Jerk						
Total						
59 kg
Snatch	54 kg	Krystol Chanderban	April 2019	Pan American Championships	Guatemala City, Guatemala	
Clean & Jerk	68 kg	Krystol Chanderban	April 2019	Pan American Championships	Guatemala City, Guatemala	
Total	122 kg	Krystol Chanderban	April 2019	Pan American Championships	Guatemala City, Guatemala	
64 kg
Snatch	70 kg	Delice Adonis	25 June 2023	CAC Games	San Salvador, El Salvador	
Clean and Jerk	90 kg	Delice Adonis	20 April 2023	Central American & Caribbean Championships	Santo Domingo, Dominican Republic	
Total	160 kg	Delice Adonis	25 June 2023	CAC Games	San Salvador, El Salvador	
71 kg
Snatch						
Clean and Jerk						
Total						
76 kg
Snatch						
Clean and Jerk						
Total						
81 kg
Snatch						
Clean and Jerk						
Total						
87 kg
Snatch						
Clean and Jerk						
Total						
+87 kg
Snatch						
Clean and Jerk						
Total						
