= Keiser Witte =

American weightlifter (born 1995)

Personal information
- Born: March 15, 1995 (age 31)
- Height: 6 ft 6 in (198 cm)
- Weight: 320 lb (145 kg)
- Spouse: Sabrina Witte

Sport
- Country: United States
- Sport: Weightlifting
Medal record
Men's weightlifting
Representing the United States
Pan American Games
| Silver medal – second place | 2023 Santiago | +102 kg |
Pan American Championships
| Gold medal – first place | 2021 Guayaquil | +109 kg |
| Bronze medal – third place | 2019 Guatemala City | +109 kg |

Keiser Witte (born March 15, 1995) is an American weightlifter. He won the silver medal in the men's +102 kg event at the 2023 Pan American Games held in Santiago, Chile. He is also a two-time medalist, including gold, at the Pan American Weightlifting Championships.

== Achievements ==
| Year | Venue | Weight | Snatch (kg) | | | | Clean & Jerk (kg) | | | | Total | Rank |
| Year | Venue | Weight | 1 | 2 | 3 | Rank | 1 | 2 | 3 | Rank | Total | Rank |
Pan American Games
| 2023 | Santiago, Chile | +102 kg | ~~180~~ | 180 | 187 | —N/a | 215 | ~~222~~ | 222 | —N/a | 409 | 2nd place, silver medalist(s) |
