= Cicely Kyle =

American weightlifter (born 1984)

Personal information
- Full name: Cicely Jevon Kyle
- Born: October 12, 1984 (age 41)

Sport
- Country: United States
- Sport: Weightlifting
- Weight class: 45 kg
Medal record
Women's weightlifting
Representing United States
Pan American Championships
Gold medal – first place	2020 Santo Domingo	45 kg
Silver medal – second place	2022 Bogotá	45 kg
IWF World Cup
Gold medal – first place	2020 Rome	45 kg

Cicely Jevon Kyle (born October 12, 1984) is an American weightlifter. She is a two-time medalist, including gold, at the Pan American Weightlifting Championships.

== Career ==
In December 2015, she received a two-year sanction for an anti-doping rule violation.

In 2020, she won the gold medal in the women's 45 kg event at the Roma 2020 World Cup in Rome, Italy.

In 2021, she won the gold medal in the women's 45 kg event at the 2020 Pan American Weightlifting Championships held in Santo Domingo, Dominican Republic. She also set a new American record in the Clean and Jerk with a lift of 96 kg. She won the silver medal in her event at the 2022 Pan American Weightlifting Championships held in Bogotá, Colombia.

In 2022, she competed in the women's 45 kg event at the World Weightlifting Championships in Bogotá, Colombia.

== Achievements ==
Year	Venue	Weight	Snatch (kg)				Clean & Jerk (kg)				Total	Rank
Year	Venue	Weight	1	2	3	Rank	1	2	3	Rank	Total	Rank
World Championships
2022	Bogotá, Colombia	45 kg	~~71~~	71	~~73~~	5	~~90~~	~~90~~	91	5	162	5
Pan American Championships
2020	Santo Domingo, Dominican Republic	45 kg	~~68~~	68	70	1st place, gold medalist(s)	88	91	96	1st place, gold medalist(s)	166	1st place, gold medalist(s)
2022	Bogotá, Colombia	45 kg	68	~~71~~	71	2nd place, silver medalist(s)	85	89	~~93~~	2nd place, silver medalist(s)	160	2nd place, silver medalist(s)
World Cup
2020	Rome, Italy	45 kg	64	67	70	2nd place, silver medalist(s)	86	90	93	1st place, gold medalist(s)	163	1st place, gold medalist(s)
