= José Poox =

Mexican weightlifter (born 2003)

Personal information
- Full name: José Manuel Poox Peralta
- Born: 17 March 2003 (age 23)

Sport
- Country: Mexico
- Sport: Weightlifting
- Weight class: 55 kg
Medal record
Men's weightlifting
Representing Mexico
Pan American Championships
Gold medal – first place	2023 Bariloche	55 kg
Silver medal – second place	2022 Bogotá	55 kg
Silver medal – second place	2024 Caracas	55 kg
Bronze medal – third place	2020 Santo Domingo	55 kg
Bronze medal – third place	2021 Guayaquil	55 kg
Junior World Championships
Gold medal – first place	2023 Guadalajara	55 kg
Silver medal – second place	2022 Heraklion	55 kg
Youth World Championships
Bronze medal – third place	2019 Las Vegas	55 kg

José Manuel Poox Peralta (born 17 March 2003) is a Mexican weightlifter. He is a five-time medalist, including gold, at the Pan American Weightlifting Championships.

== Career ==
Poox is a native of Champotón Municipality, Campeche.

He won the bronze medal in the men's 55 kg event at the 2019 Youth World Weightlifting Championships held in Las Vegas, United States. He won the bronze medal in his event at the 2020 Pan American Weightlifting Championships held in Santo Domingo, Dominican Republic and the 2021 Pan American Weightlifting Championships held in Guayaquil, Ecuador.

Poox won the silver medal in the men's 55 kg event at the 2022 Junior World Weightlifting Championships held in Heraklion, Greece. A few months later, Poox won the silver medal in the men's 55 kg event at the Pan American Weightlifting Championships held in Bogotá, Colombia.

Poox won the gold medal in the men's 55 kg event at the 2023 Pan American Weightlifting Championships held in Bariloche, Argentina. He also won the gold medal in the Snatch and Clean & Jerk events. In 2024, he won the silver medal in his event at the Pan American Weightlifting Championships held in Caracas, Venezuela.

== Achievements ==
Year	Venue	Weight	Snatch (kg)				Clean & Jerk (kg)				Total	Rank
Year	Venue	Weight	1	2	3	Rank	1	2	3	Rank	Total	Rank
World Championships
2022	Bogotá, Colombia	55 kg	100	104	~~106~~	11	130	135	~~138~~	7	239	9
2023	Riyadh, Saudi Arabia	55 kg	~~100~~	100	~~103~~	16	128	132	~~134~~	10	232	14
2024	Manama, Bahrain	55 kg	100	105	~~107~~	8	130	135	138	9	243	8
2025	Førde, Norway	60 kg	105	~~110~~	~~110~~	19	137	~~145~~	~~149~~	15	242	15
Pan American Championships
2020	Santo Domingo, Dominican Republic	55 kg	94	97	~~101~~	3rd place, bronze medalist(s)	123	128	133	2nd place, silver medalist(s)	230	3rd place, bronze medalist(s)
2021	Guayaquil, Ecuador	55 kg	95	~~101~~	101	3rd place, bronze medalist(s)	~~128~~	128	~~133~~	3rd place, bronze medalist(s)	229	3rd place, bronze medalist(s)
2022	Bogotá, Colombia	55 kg	98	101	104	2nd place, silver medalist(s)	126	130	~~135~~	2nd place, silver medalist(s)	234	2nd place, silver medalist(s)
2023	Bariloche, Argentina	55 kg	97	101	103	1st place, gold medalist(s)	126	130	~~135~~	1st place, gold medalist(s)	233	1st place, gold medalist(s)
