= Dayana Mina =

Ecuadorian weightlifter (born 1998)

Personal information
- Full name: Dayana Lucia Mina Torres
- Born: 2 April 1998 (age 28)

Sport
- Country: Ecuador
- Sport: Weightlifting
- Weight class: 87 kg
Medal record
Women's weightlifting
Representing Ecuador
Pan American Championships
Gold medal – first place	2023 Bariloche	87 kg
Silver medal – second place	2019 Guatemala City	81 kg
Bronze medal – third place	2024 Caracas	87 kg
Bolivarian Games
Bronze medal – third place	2024 Ayacucho	87 kg

Dayana Lucia Mina Torres (born 2 April 1998) is an Ecuadorian weightlifter. She won the gold medal in the women's 87 kg event at the 2023 Pan American Weightlifting Championships held in Bariloche, Argentina.

Mina won the silver medal in the women's 81 kg event at the 2019 Pan American Weightlifting Championships held in Guatemala City, Guatemala. She competed in the women's 87 kg event at the 2022 World Weightlifting Championships held in Bogotá, Colombia.

In 2024, she won the bronze medal in the women's 87 kg event at the Pan American Weightlifting Championships held in Caracas, Venezuela. She won the bronze medal in her event at the 2024 Bolivarian Games held in Ayacucho, Peru.

== Achievements ==
Year	Venue	Weight	Snatch (kg)				Clean & Jerk (kg)				Total	Rank
Year	Venue	Weight	1	2	3	Rank	1	2	3	Rank	Total	Rank
World Championships
2022	Bogotá, Colombia	87 kg	99	102	~~105~~	10	125	130	~~134~~	5	232	7
Pan American Championships
2019	Guatemala City, Guatemala	81 kg	95	100	103	1st place, gold medalist(s)	123	126	129	2nd place, silver medalist(s)	232	2nd place, silver medalist(s)
2022	Bogotá, Colombia	87 kg	95	100	~~106~~	5	125	130	~~132~~	5	230	5
2023	Bariloche, Argentina	87 kg	96	100	~~104~~	1st place, gold medalist(s)	123	129	133	1st place, gold medalist(s)	233	1st place, gold medalist(s)
