= Jourdan Delacruz =

American weightlifter (born 1998)

Personal information
- Full name: Jourdan Elizabeth Delacruz
- Born: May 20, 1998 (age 28) Wylie, Texas, U.S.
- Education: University of Northern Colorado (2023)
- Height: 5 ft (152 cm)

Sport
- Country: United States
- Sport: Weightlifting
- Weight class: 49 kg
- Coached by: Spencer Arnold
Medal record
Women's weightlifting
Representing United States
World Championships
Bronze medal – third place	2023 Riyadh	49 kg
Pan American Championships
Gold medal – first place	2019 Guatemala City	55 kg
Gold medal – first place	2020 Santo Domingo	49 kg
Gold medal – first place	2023 Bariloche	49 kg
Silver medal – second place	2022 Bogotá	49 kg
IWF World Cup
Gold medal – first place	2020 Rome	49 kg
Junior World Championships
Silver medal – second place	2018 Tashkent	53 kg

Jourdan Elizabeth Delacruz (/ˈdʒɔːrdən ˈdɛləkruːz/ JOR-dən DEL-ə-krooz; born May 20, 1998) is an American weightlifter. She is a bronze medalist at the World Weightlifting Championships and a four-time medalist, including three gold medals, at the Pan American Weightlifting Championships. She represented the United States at the 2020 Summer Olympics in Tokyo, Japan and the 2024 Summer Olympics in Paris, France.

== Career ==
Delacruz won the silver medal in the women's 53 kg event at the 2018 Junior World Weightlifting Championships held in Tashkent, Uzbekistan. In that same year, she competed in the women's 55 kg event at the 2018 World Weightlifting Championships in Ashgabat, Turkmenistan.

At the 2019 Pan American Weightlifting Championships held in Guatemala City, Guatemala, she won the gold medal in the women's 55 kg event. Delacruz also represented the United States at the 2019 Pan American Games in Lima, Peru in the women's 55 kg event. She finished in 4th place. In that same year, she competed in the women's 55 kg event at the 2019 World Weightlifting Championships held in Pattaya, Thailand. After this competition, she began competing in the 49 kg weight class and she won the gold medal in this event at the 2019 International Naim Suleymanoglu Tournament held in Gaziantep, Turkey.

In 2020, Delacruz won the gold medal in the women's 49 kg event at the Roma 2020 World Cup in Rome, Italy. She also won the gold medals in both the 49 kg Snatch and 49 kg Clean & Jerk events. In 2021, Delacruz won the gold medal in the women's 49 kg event at the 2020 Pan American Weightlifting Championships held in Santo Domingo, Dominican Republic. She also won the gold medal in the Snatch and Clean & Jerk events.

Delacruz represented the United States at the 2020 Summer Olympics in Tokyo, Japan. She competed in the women's 49 kg event where she did not rank after failing to register a result in the Clean & Jerk.

Delacruz won the silver medal in her event at the 2022 Pan American Weightlifting Championships held in Bogotá, Colombia. She also won the gold medal in the Clean & Jerk event in this competition. She finished in 7th place in the women's 49 kg event at the 2022 World Weightlifting Championships held in Bogotá, Colombia.

Delacruz won the gold medal in her event at the 2023 Pan American Weightlifting Championships held in Bariloche, Argentina. She also won the gold medal in the Snatch and Clean & Jerk events. Delacruz won the bronze medal in the women's 49 kg event at the 2023 World Weightlifting Championships held in Riyadh, Saudi Arabia. She also won the bronze medal in the Clean & Jerk in this event.

Delacruz again represented the United States at the 2024 Summer Olympics in Paris, France. She lifted 84 kg in Snatch and 111 kg in Clean & Jerk setting 195 kg in total and placing fifth in her second Olympic Games.

== Personal life ==
Delacruz graduated from the University of Northern Colorado with a degree in Dietetics in December 2023.

== Achievements ==
Year	Venue	Weight	Snatch (kg)				Clean & Jerk (kg)				Total	Rank
Year	Venue	Weight	1	2	3	Rank	1	2	3	Rank	Total	Rank
Summer Olympics
2021	Tokyo, Japan	49 kg	83	86	~~89~~	—N/a	~~108~~	~~108~~	~~108~~	—N/a	DNF	—
2024	Paris, France	49 kg	84	~~87~~	~~88~~	—N/a	105	~~110~~	111	—N/a	195	5
World Championships
2018	Ashgabat, Turkmenistan	55 kg	~~83~~	83	86	16	107	110	112	10	198	13
2019	Pattaya, Thailand	55 kg	~~87~~	88	~~91~~	11	109	112	~~115~~	7	200	9
2022	Bogotá, Colombia	49 kg	84	~~86~~	86	6	~~105~~	105	~~109~~	5	191	7
2023	Riyadh, Saudi Arabia	49 kg	~~85~~	85	88	4	~~107~~	108	112	3rd place, bronze medalist(s)	200	3rd place, bronze medalist(s)
World Cup
2020	Rome, Italy	49 kg	82	85	87	1st place, gold medalist(s)	102	105	108	1st place, gold medalist(s)	195	1st place, gold medalist(s)
2024	Phuket, Thailand	55 kg	—	—	—	—	—	—	—	—	—	—
Pan American Games
2019	Lima, Peru	55 kg	~~87~~	~~88~~	88	—N/a	109	~~113~~	~~115~~	—N/a	197	4
Pan American Championships
2019	Guatemala City, Guatemala	55 kg	87	~~87~~	91	3rd place, bronze medalist(s)	110	113	116	1st place, gold medalist(s)	207	1st place, gold medalist(s)
2020	Santo Domingo, Dominican Republic	49 kg	83	86	89	1st place, gold medalist(s)	104	108	111	1st place, gold medalist(s)	200	1st place, gold medalist(s)
2022	Bogotá, Colombia	49 kg	80	83	~~85~~	4	~~102~~	104	108	1st place, gold medalist(s)	191	2nd place, silver medalist(s)
2023	Bariloche, Argentina	49 kg	83	86	~~89~~	1st place, gold medalist(s)	105	109	112	1st place, gold medalist(s)	198	1st place, gold medalist(s)
2025	Cali, Colombia	53 kg	83	86	88	2nd place, silver medalist(s)	104	108	~~111~~	4	196	4
