= Olfides Sáez =

Cuban weightlifter (born 1994)

Personal information
- Born: 24 September 1994 (age 31) Abreus, Cuba

Sport
- Country: Cuba
- Sport: Weightlifting
- Weight class: 89 kg
Medal record
Men's weightlifting
Representing Cuba
Pan American Games
Bronze medal – third place	2023 Santiago	89 kg
Pan American Championships
Silver medal – second place	2016 Cartagena	85 kg
Silver medal – second place	2020 Santo Domingo	89 kg
Silver medal – second place	2023 Bariloche	89 kg
Bronze medal – third place	2018 Santo Domingo	85 kg
Bronze medal – third place	2024 Caracas	89 kg
IWF World Cup
Gold medal – first place	2020 Rome	89 kg

Olfides Sáez Vera (born 24 September 1994) is a Cuban weightlifter. In 2020, he won the gold medal in the men's 89 kg event at the Roma 2020 World Cup in Rome, Italy. He is also a five-time medalist at the Pan American Weightlifting Championships.

Sáez represented Cuba at the 2020 Summer Olympics in Tokyo, Japan. He finished in 9th place in the men's 96 kg event.

He won the silver medal in the men's 89 kg event at the 2023 Pan American Weightlifting Championships held in Bariloche, Argentina. In 2024, he won the bronze medal in his event at the Pan American Weightlifting Championships held in Caracas, Venezuela.
