= Tatiana Ullua =

Argentine weightlifter (born 1992)

Personal information
- Born: 23 April 1992 (age 34)

Sport
- Country: Argentina
- Sport: Weightlifting
- Weight class: 64 kg
Medal record
Women's weightlifting
Representing Argentina
Pan American Championships
Gold medal – first place	2023 Bariloche	64 kg
South American Games
Bronze medal – third place	2022 Asunción	64 kg

Tatiana Ullua (born 23 April 1992) is an Argentine weightlifter. She won the gold medal in the women's 64 kg event at the 2023 Pan American Weightlifting Championships held in Bariloche, Argentina. She won the bronze medal in the women's 64 kg event at the 2022 South American Games held in Asunción, Paraguay.

Ullua competed in the women's 59 kg event at the 2019 Pan American Games held in Lima, Peru. In 2022, she competed in the women's 64 kg event at the Pan American Weightlifting Championships held in Bogotá, Colombia.

Ullua competed in the women's 71 kg event at the 2023 Pan American Games held in Santiago, Chile.

== Achievements ==
Year	Venue	Weight	Snatch (kg)				Clean & Jerk (kg)				Total	Rank
Year	Venue	Weight	1	2	3	Rank	1	2	3	Rank	Total	Rank
Pan American Games
2019	Lima, Peru	59 kg	87	~~90~~	~~90~~	—N/a	104	~~107~~	~~108~~	—N/a	191	9
2023	Santiago, Chile	71 kg	~~92~~	92	~~96~~	—N/a	112	116	~~118~~	—N/a	208	8
Pan American Championships
2022	Bogotá, Colombia	64 kg	~~87~~	87	89	4	~~107~~	107	~~111~~	9	196	7
2023	Bariloche, Argentina	64 kg	87	89	92	1st place, gold medalist(s)	~~108~~	108	111	1st place, gold medalist(s)	203	1st place, gold medalist(s)
South American Games
2022	Asunción, Paraguay	64 kg	88	91	~~93~~	—N/a	~~108~~	108	112	—N/a	203	3rd place, bronze medalist(s)
