= Hayley Reichardt =

American weightlifter (born 1999)

Personal information
- Full name: Hayley Marie Reichardt
- Born: April 27, 1999 (age 27)

Sport
- Country: United States
- Sport: Weightlifting
- Weight class: 49 kg
Medal record
Women's weightlifting
Representing United States
Pan American Championships
Gold medal – first place	2021 Guayaquil	49 kg
Gold medal – first place	2022 Bogotá	49 kg
Silver medal – second place	2020 Santo Domingo	49 kg
Silver medal – second place	2023 Bariloche	49 kg
Junior World Championships
Bronze medal – third place	2019 Suva	49 kg

Hayley Marie Reichardt (born April 27, 1999) is an American weightlifter. She is a four-time medalist, including two gold medals, at the Pan American Weightlifting Championships.

== Career ==
Reichardt competed at the 2019 Junior World Weightlifting Championships held in Suva, Fiji where she won the bronze medal in the women's 49 kg event. She also won the bronze medal in the women's 49 kg Clean & Jerk event.

Reichardt won the silver medal in her event at the 2020 Pan American Weightlifting Championships held in Santo Domingo, Dominican Republic. She won the gold medal in her event at the 2021 Pan American Weightlifting Championships held in Guayaquil, Ecuador and the 2022 Pan American Weightlifting Championships held in Bogotá, Colombia.

She won the bronze medal in the women's 49 kg Clean & Jerk event at the 2022 World Weightlifting Championships held in Bogotá, Colombia. A few months later, Reichardt won the silver medal in her event at the 2023 Pan American Weightlifting Championships held in Bariloche, Argentina. She also won the silver medal in the Snatch and Clean & Jerk events.

Reichardt competed in the women's 49 kg event at the 2023 World Weightlifting Championships held in Riyadh, Saudi Arabia.

== Achievements ==
Year	Venue	Weight	Snatch (kg)				Clean & Jerk (kg)				Total	Rank
Year	Venue	Weight	1	2	3	Rank	1	2	3	Rank	Total	Rank
World Championships
2022	Bogotá, Colombia	49 kg	81	~~83~~	84	8	104	107	110	3rd place, bronze medalist(s)	194	5
2023	Riyadh, Saudi Arabia	49 kg	82	~~85~~	~~85~~	9	107	~~110~~	~~110~~	5	189	6
Pan American Championships
2020	Santo Domingo, Dominican Republic	49 kg	80	82	~~84~~	3rd place, bronze medalist(s)	104	107	~~109~~	2nd place, silver medalist(s)	189	2nd place, silver medalist(s)
2021	Guayaquil, Ecuador	49 kg	~~81~~	81	83	1st place, gold medalist(s)	101	104	~~107~~	1st place, gold medalist(s)	187	1st place, gold medalist(s)
2022	Bogotá, Colombia	49 kg	82	~~84~~	84	3rd place, bronze medalist(s)	106	~~108~~	108	2nd place, silver medalist(s)	192	1st place, gold medalist(s)
2023	Bariloche, Argentina	49 kg	~~83~~	83	86	2nd place, silver medalist(s)	108	111	~~113~~	2nd place, silver medalist(s)	197	2nd place, silver medalist(s)
