= Georgi Yochev =

Bulgarian weightlifter

Personal information
- Nationality: Bulgarian
- Born: 19 September 2003 (age 22) Asenovgrad, Bulgaria
- Weight: 89.00 kg (196 lb)

Sport
- Country: Bulgaria
- Sport: Weightlifting
- Weight class: 89 kg
- Club: Asenovec
- Coached by: Ivan Ivanov; Lachezar Kishkilov
Medal record
Youth World Cup Online
Bronze medal – third place	2020 Peru	–89 kg
European Youth Championships
Silver medal – second place	2018 San Donato Milanese	–85 kg

Georgi Yochev (Bulgarian: Георги Йочев born 19 September 2003) is a Bulgarian male weightlifter.

== Major results ==
Year	Venue	Weight	Snatch (kg)				Clean & Jerk (kg)				Total	Rank
Year	Venue	Weight	1	2	3	Rank	1	2	3	Rank	Total	Rank
World Youth Weightlifting Championships
2019	(United States) Las Vegas, USA	89 kg	115	120	123	6	~~150~~	151	154	6	277	5
Youth World Cup Online
2020	Lima, Peru	89 kg	130	135	~~137~~	4	160	166	~~170~~	3rd place, bronze medalist(s)	301	(bronze)
European Youth Weightlifting Championships
2018	San Donato Milanese, Italy	85 kg	105	111	~~116~~	2nd place, silver medalist(s)	135	145	~~151~~	2nd place, silver medalist(s)	256	(silver)
