= Dixon Arroyo (weightlifter) =

Ecuadorian weightlifter (born 1997)

Personal information
- Full name: Dixon Bladimir Arroyo Valdez
- Born: 12 August 1997 (age 28)

Sport
- Country: Ecuador
- Sport: Weightlifting
- Weight class: +109 kg
Medal record
Men's weightlifting
Representing Ecuador
Pan American Championships
Bronze medal – third place	2023 Bariloche	+109 kg
Pan American Games
Bronze medal – third place	2023 Santiago	+102 kg
South American Games
Gold medal – first place	2022 Asunción	+109 kg
Bolivarian Games
Gold medal – first place	2022 Valledupar	+109 kg S
Gold medal – first place	2022 Valledupar	+109 kg CJ
Bronze medal – third place	2024 Ayacucho	+109 kg

Dixon Bladimir Arroyo Valdez (born 12 August 1997) is an Ecuadorian weightlifter. He won the gold medal in men's +109 kg event at the 2022 South American Games held in Asunción, Paraguay. He is also a two-time gold medalist at the 2022 Bolivarian Games held in Valledupar, Colombia.

In 2019, Arroyo competed in the men's 109 kg event at the Pan American Games held in Lima, Peru. In 2021, he competed in the men's +109 kg event at the World Weightlifting Championships held in Tashkent, Uzbekistan. Arroyo won the bronze medal in the men's +102 kg event at the 2023 Pan American Games held in Santiago, Chile.

He won the bronze medal in his event at the 2024 Bolivarian Games held in Ayacucho, Peru.

== Achievements ==
Year	Venue	Weight	Snatch (kg)				Clean & Jerk (kg)				Total	Rank
Year	Venue	Weight	1	2	3	Rank	1	2	3	Rank	Total	Rank
World Championships
2021	Tashkent, Uzbekistan	+109 kg	170	177	~~182~~	11	~~192~~	~~192~~	192	23	369	21
2022	Bogotá, Colombia	+109 kg	171	~~176~~	176	17	~~190~~	190	~~197~~	21	366	17
Pan American Games
2019	Lima, Peru	109 kg	~~155~~	~~155~~	~~155~~	—N/a	—	—	—	—N/a	—	—
2023	Santiago, Chile	+102 kg	171	175	~~178~~	—N/a	191	196	~~200~~	—N/a	371	3rd place, bronze medalist(s)
Pan American Championships
2021	Guayaquil, Ecuador	+109 kg	170	176	180	3rd place, bronze medalist(s)	190	201	~~206~~	5	381	4
2022	Bogotá, Colombia	+109 kg	170	~~176~~	~~176~~	4	190	197	~~203~~	6	367	5
2023	Bariloche, Argentina	+109 kg	168	171	174	1st place, gold medalist(s)	190	196	200	4	374	3rd place, bronze medalist(s)
South American Games
2022	Asunción, Paraguay	+109 kg	170	175	~~180~~	—N/a	191	197	~~205~~	—N/a	372	1st place, gold medalist(s)
Bolivarian Games
2022	Valledupar, Colombia	+109 kg	161	170	180	1st place, gold medalist(s)	190	196	201	1st place, gold medalist(s)	—N/a	—N/a
2024	Ayacucho, Peru	+109 kg	160	170	175	—N/a	~~185~~	~~186~~	187	—N/a	362	3rd place, bronze medalist(s)
