= María Lobón =

Colombian weightlifter (born 1995)

Personal information
- Nationality: Colombian
- Born: María Camila Viafara Lobón; September 30, 1995 (age 30)
- Weight: 58.75 kg (130 lb)

Sport
- Country: Colombia
- Sport: Weightlifting
- Event: 59 kg
- Coached by: Russell McCarthy
Medal record
Representing Colombia
Women's weightlifting
Pan American Games
Gold medal – first place	2019 Lima	59 kg
Pan American Championships
Silver medal – second place	2017 Miami	58 kg
Silver medal – second place	2019 Guatemala City	59 kg
South American Games
Bronze medal – third place	2018 Cochabamba	58 kg

María Camila Viafara Lobón (born September 30, 1995) is a Colombian weightlifter and Pan American Games Champion competing in the 58 kg category until 2018 and 59 kg starting in 2018 after the International Weightlifting Federation reorganized the categories.

== Career ==
In 2019 she competed at the 2019 Pan American Games in the 59 kg division winning a gold medal.
