= Weightlifting at the 2023 Pan American Games – Men's +102 kg =

Weightlifting – Men's +102kg at the 2023 Pan American Games
- Venue: Gimnasio Chimkowe
- Dates: 24 October
- Competitors: 10 from 9 nations

Medalists
| Gold medal | Rafael Cerro | Colombia |
| Silver medal | Keiser Witte | United States |
| Bronze medal | Dixon Arroyo | Ecuador |

The men's +102 kg competition of the weightlifting events at the 2023 Pan American Games in Santiago, Chile, was held on 24 October at the Gimnasio Chimkowe.

Each lifter performed in both the snatch and clean and jerk lifts, with the final score being the sum of the lifter's best result in each. The athlete received three attempts in each of the two lifts; the score for the lift was the heaviest weight successfully lifted. This weightlifting event was limited to competitors with a minimum of 102 kilograms of body mass.

== Results ==
The results were as follows:

| Rank | Athlete | Nation | Group | Snatch (kg) | | | | Clean & Jerk (kg) | | | | Total |
| Rank | Athlete | Nation | Group | 1 | 2 | 3 | Result | 1 | 2 | 3 | Result | Total |
|---|---|---|---|---|---|---|---|---|---|---|---|---|
| 1st place, gold medalist(s) | Rafael Cerro | Colombia | A | 180 | ~~185~~ | 185 | 185 | 220 | ~~225~~ | 225 | 225 | 410 |
| 2nd place, silver medalist(s) | Keiser Witte | United States | A | ~~180~~ | 180 | 187 | 187 | 215 | ~~222~~ | 222 | 222 | 409 |
| 3rd place, bronze medalist(s) | Dixon Arroyo | Ecuador | A | 171 | 175 | ~~178~~ | 175 | 191 | 196 | ~~200~~ | 196 | 371 |
| 4 | Josué Andueza | Mexico | A | ~~165~~ | 165 | ~~171~~ | 165 | 200 | ~~207~~ | ~~207~~ | 200 | 365 |
| 5 | Ezequiel Germán | Dominican Republic | A | 155 | 161 | ~~165~~ | 161 | 191 | 198 | 204 | 204 | 365 |
| 6 | Gilberto Lemus | Independent Athletes Team | A | 165 | ~~174~~ | ~~175~~ | 165 | 195 | ~~204~~ | ~~207~~ | 195 | 360 |
| 7 | Luis Quiñones | Colombia | A | 153 | 160 | ~~163~~ | 160 | ~~200~~ | 200 | – | 200 | 360 |
| 8 | Hernán Viera | Peru | A | 146 | 152 | ~~156~~ | 152 | 205 | ~~215~~ | ~~220~~ | 205 | 357 |
| 9 | Eduardo Noriega | Bolivia | A | 130 | 140 | ~~146~~ | 140 | 160 | ~~170~~ | ~~172~~ | 160 | 300 |
| 10 | Mateus Gregório | Brazil | A | ~~160~~ | ~~160~~ | ~~160~~ | – | – | | | | DNS |
