= Weightlifting at the 2023 Pan American Games – Men's 61 kg =

Weightlifting – Men's 61kg at the 2023 Pan American Games
- Venue: Gimnasio Chimkowe
- Dates: 21 October
- Competitors: 9 from 9 nations

Medalists
Gold medal	Arley Calderón	Cuba
Silver medal	Victor Guemez	Mexico
Bronze medal	Luis Bardalez	Peru

The men's 61 kg competition of the weightlifting events at the 2023 Pan American Games in Santiago, Chile, was held on 21 October at the Gimnasio Chimkowe.

Each lifter performed in both the snatch and clean and jerk lifts, with the final score being the sum of the lifter's best result in each. The athlete received three attempts in each of the two lifts; the score for the lift was the heaviest weight successfully lifted. This weightlifting event was the lightest men's event at the weightlifting competition, limiting competitors to a maximum of 61 kilograms of body mass.

== Results ==
The results were as follows:

Rank	Athlete	Nation	Group	Snatch (kg)				Clean & Jerk (kg)				Total
Rank	Athlete	Nation	Group	1	2	3	Result	1	2	3	Result	Total
1st place, gold medalist(s)	Arley Calderón	Cuba	A	~~122~~	122	125	125	154	–	–	154	279
2nd place, silver medalist(s)	Victor Guemez	Mexico	A	119	123	~~125~~	123	~~150~~	150	153	153	276
3rd place, bronze medalist(s)	Luis Bardalez	Peru	A	119	122	124	124	~~151~~	151	~~153~~	151	275
4	Wilkeinner Rodríguez	Venezuela	A	119	122	125	125	149	~~152~~	~~152~~	149	274
5	Estiven Villar	Colombia	A	118	122	124	124	~~148~~	149	~~152~~	149	273
6	Víctor Garrido	Ecuador	A	118	122	~~124~~	122	145	~~149~~	~~149~~	145	267
7	Thiago Félix	Brazil	A	115	~~120~~	~~121~~	115	147	~~152~~	~~152~~	147	262
8	Aldair Castro	Chile	A	~~113~~	113	116	116	137	144	~~148~~	144	260
9	Juan Martínez	Panama	A	101	106	~~110~~	106	120	125	~~130~~	125	231
