= Pan American Weightlifting Federation =

The Pan American Weightlifting Federation (PAWF) was established in 1951. The federation is the body that governs and oversees weightlifting sports in North America, Central America, South America and the Caribbean.

== Events organized ==
=== Senior ===
1. Pan American Weightlifting Championships (since 1982)
2. Pan American Masters Weightlifting Championships (since 1998)
3. Online Pan American Weightlifting Championships (since 2020)
4. Ibero-American Weightlifting Championships
5. South American Weightlifting Championships
6. Simon Bolivar Weightlifting Championships (26th in 2010)

=== Junior ===
1. Pan American Junior Weightlifting Championships
2. South American Junior Weightlifting Championships

=== Youth ===
1. Pan American Youth Weightlifting Championships
2. South American Youth Weightlifting Championships

== See also ==
- Weightlifting at the Pan American Games
