= Katherine Vibert =

American weightlifter (born 1999)

Katherine Elizabeth Vibert
Personal information
- Nationality: American
- Born: January 5, 1999 (age 27) Ann Arbor, MI
- Height: 5 ft 4 in (163 cm)
- Weight: 75.9 kg (167 lb)

Sport
- Country: United States
- Sport: Weightlifting
- Event: –76 kg
- Club: Power and Grace Performance

Achievements and titles
- Personal bests: Snatch: 112 kg (2019 JWR); Clean & jerk: 138 kg (2021); Total: 249 kg (2021)
Medal record
Representing United States
Olympic Games
Silver medal – second place	2020 Tokyo	–76 kg
World Championships
Gold medal – first place	2019 Pattaya	–71 kg
Pan American Championships
Gold medal – first place	2019 Guatemala City	–71 kg
Gold medal – first place	2021 Guayaquil	–76 kg
Silver medal – second place	2020 Santo Domingo	–76 kg
Silver medal – second place	2023 Bariloche	–71 kg
Pan American Games
Bronze medal – third place	2019 Lima	–76 kg
Junior World Championships
Gold medal – first place	2019 Suva	–71 kg
Silver medal – second place	2018 Tashkent	–69 kg

Katherine Vibert (born January 5, 1999) is an American weightlifter, Olympian, World Champion, Pan American champion and Junior World Champion competing in the 69 kg category until 2018 and 71 kg starting in 2018 after the International Weightlifting Federation reorganized the categories. She is a winner of the IWF Female Lifter of the Year for 2019.

== Career ==
Vibert won a silver medal in the 69kg division at the 2018 Junior World Weightlifting Championships.

In 2019, Vibert competed at the Pan American Weightlifting Championships in the 71 kg division against teammate Mattie Rogers. During the competition she set Panamerican records in the snatch and total on her way to winning gold medals in all three lifts. In June 2019, she competed at the Junior World Weightlifting Championships in the 71 kg category, where her total of 246 kg was a full 34 kg over the silver medalist.

At the 2019 World Weightlifting Championships, Vibert competed in the 71 kg division against teammate Mattie Rogers. In the snatch portion she set a junior world record with a 112 kg lift. She completed a 136 kg clean & jerk to sweep gold medals in all lifts. She became the youngest U.S. woman to win a World championship, and the second since Robin Goad in 1994. With her gold medals at the Pan American Weightlifting Championships, Junior World Weightlifting Championships and World Weightlifting Championships in 2019 she was awarded the 2019 IWF Lifter of the Year with 9,105 votes.

In 2021, Vibert competed at the 2020 Olympics in the women's 76 kg event, winning a silver medal, the highest achievement for an American athlete since 2000.

Vibert won the silver medal in the women's 71 kg event at the 2023 Pan American Weightlifting Championships held in Bariloche, Argentina. She finished in 5th place in the women's 71 kg event at the 2023 World Weightlifting Championships held in Riyadh, Saudi Arabia.

== Major results ==
Year	Venue	Weight	Snatch (kg)				Clean & Jerk (kg)				Total	Rank
Year	Venue	Weight	1	2	3	Rank	1	2	3	Rank	Total	Rank
Olympic Games
2020	Tokyo, Japan	76 kg	107	111	~~114~~	2	133	138	~~148~~	2	249	2nd place, silver medalist(s)
World Championships
2019	Pattaya, Thailand	71 kg	~~106~~	107	112	1st place, gold medalist(s)	131	136	~~141~~	1st place, gold medalist(s)	248	1st place, gold medalist(s)
2023	Riyadh, Saudi Arabia	71 kg	107	107	~~111~~	8	~~133~~	133	137	4	244	5
IWF World Cup
2024	Phuket, Thailand	81 kg	109	113	~~116~~	5	140	145	~~151~~	4	258	4
Pan American Weightlifting Championships
2019	Guatemala City, Guatemala	71 kg	104	107	110	1st place, gold medalist(s)	128	131	135	1st place, gold medalist(s)	245	1st place, gold medalist(s)
Pan American Games
2019	Lima, Peru	76 kg	104	108	~~112~~	3	~~133~~	135	~~140~~	4	243	3rd place, bronze medalist(s)
Junior World Weightlifting Championships
2018	Tashkent, Uzbekistan	69 kg	96	100	~~104~~	2nd place, silver medalist(s)	117	122	125	2nd place, silver medalist(s)	225	2nd place, silver medalist(s)
2019	Suva, Fiji	71 kg	104	~~108~~	109	1st place, gold medalist(s)	128	133	137	1st place, gold medalist(s)	246	1st place, gold medalist(s)
