= Weightlifting at the 2019 Pan American Games – Women's 59 kg =

Weightlifting – Women's 59 kg at the 2019 Pan American Games
- Venue: Coliseo Mariscal Caceres
- Dates: July 28
- Competitors: 10 from 7 nations

Medalists
Gold medal	María Lobón	Colombia
Silver medal	Alexandra Escobar	Ecuador
Bronze medal	Yusleidy Figueroa	Venezuela

The women's 59 kg competition of the weightlifting events at the 2019 Pan American Games in Lima, Peru, was held on July 28 at the Coliseo Mariscal Caceres.

== Results ==
10 athletes from seven countries took part.

Rank	Athlete	Nation	Group	Snatch (kg)				Clean & Jerk (kg)				Total
Rank	Athlete	Nation	Group	1	2	3	Result	1	2	3	Result	Total
1st place, gold medalist(s)	María Lobón	Colombia	A	95	~~97~~	97	97	119	122	124	124	221
2nd place, silver medalist(s)	Alexandra Escobar	Ecuador	A	94	97	~~99~~	97	117	121	123	123	220
3rd place, bronze medalist(s)	Yusleidy Figueroa	Venezuela	A	93	~~96~~	~~96~~	93	122	~~126~~	~~126~~	122	215
4	Janeth Gómez	Mexico	A	92	~~95~~	95	95	113	116	119	119	214
5	Anyelin Venegas	Venezuela	A	~~89~~	~~89~~	89	89	115	119	~~121~~	119	208
6	Hunter Elam	United States	A	90	93	~~95~~	93	~~111~~	~~111~~	112	112	205
7	Tali Darsigny	Canada	A	89	92	94	94	109	~~112~~	~~112~~	109	203
8	Jessica Lucero	United States	A	~~90~~	90	93	93	110	~~115~~	~~115~~	110	203
9	Tatiana Ullua	Argentina	A	87	~~90~~	~~90~~	87	104	~~107~~	~~108~~	104	191
	Rosivé Silgado	Colombia	A	93	~~96~~	~~96~~	93	~~123~~	~~123~~	~~123~~	—	—

== New records ==
Snatch	97 kg	María Lobón (COL)	AM, PR
