= 2023 Pan American Weightlifting Championships =

- Venue: Pedro Estremador Gymnasium
- Location: Bariloche, Argentina
- Dates: 27 March – 1 April

The 2023 Pan American Weightlifting Championships were held in Bariloche, Argentina from 27 March to 1 April 2023.

Colombian weightlifters did not compete at the competition after Colombia withdrew its entire team due to a dispute over team fees payments.

== Medal summary ==
=== Men ===
| Event | Gold | | Silver | | Bronze | |
55 kg
| Snatch | José Poox; Mexico | 103 kg | Jhony Arteaga; Ecuador | 102 kg | Howard Roche; Puerto Rico | 100 kg |
| Clean & Jerk | José Poox; Mexico | 130 kg | Juan Barco; Mexico | 127 kg | Howard Roche; Puerto Rico | 126 kg |
| Total | José Poox; Mexico | 233 kg | Jhony Arteaga; Ecuador | 228 kg | Howard Roche; Puerto Rico | 226 kg |
61 kg
| Snatch | Hampton Morris; United States | 123 kg | Víctor Garrido; Ecuador | 121 kg | Thiago Silva; Brazil | 121 kg |
| Clean & Jerk | Hampton Morris; United States | 158 kg | Arley Calderón; Cuba | 155 kg | Víctor Güemez; Mexico | 152 kg |
| Total | Hampton Morris; United States | 281 kg | Arley Calderón; Cuba | 275 kg | Luis Bardalez; Peru | 271 kg |
67 kg
| Snatch | Orlando Vásquez; Nicaragua | 125 kg | Vicente Montoya; Mexico | 121 kg | Mateo Rentería; Peru | 116 kg |
| Clean & Jerk | Orlando Vásquez; Nicaragua | 154 kg | Vicente Montoya; Mexico | 147 kg | Mateo Rentería; Peru | 146 kg |
| Total | Orlando Vásquez; Nicaragua | 279 kg | Vicente Montoya; Mexico | 268 kg | Mateo Rentería; Peru | 262 kg |
73 kg
| Snatch | Julio Mayora; Venezuela | 148 kg | Ryan Grimsland; United States | 141 kg | Jorge Cárdenas; Mexico | 140 kg |
| Clean & Jerk | Julio Mayora; Venezuela | 184 kg | Ryan Grimsland; United States | 182 kg | Caden Cahoy; United States | 171 kg |
| Total | Julio Mayora; Venezuela | 332 kg | Ryan Grimsland; United States | 323 kg | Jorge Cárdenas; Mexico | 310 kg |
81 kg
| Snatch | Darvin Castro; Venezuela | 144 kg | Dante Pizzuti; Argentina | 142 kg | Samuel Guertin; Canada | 140 kg |
| Clean & Jerk | Darvin Castro; Venezuela | 180 kg | Dante Pizzuti; Argentina | 175 kg | Nicolas Vachon; Canada | 174 kg |
| Total | Darvin Castro; Venezuela | 324 kg | Dante Pizzuti; Argentina | 317 kg | Samuel Guertin; Canada | 310 kg |
89 kg
| Snatch | Keydomar Vallenilla; Venezuela | 167 kg | Alex Bellemarre; Canada | 166 kg | Olfides Sáez; Cuba | 160 kg |
| Clean & Jerk | Keydomar Vallenilla; Venezuela | 212 kg AM | Olfides Sáez; Cuba | 195 kg | Iván Escudero; Ecuador | 191 kg |
| Total | Keydomar Vallenilla; Venezuela | 379 kg | Olfides Sáez; Cuba | 355 kg | Alex Bellemarre; Canada | 354 kg |
96 kg
| Snatch | Nathan Damron; United States | 150 kg | Wilmer Contreras; Ecuador | 148 kg | Jonathan Ramos; Mexico | 147 kg |
| Clean & Jerk | José López; Mexico | 190 kg | Nathan Damron; United States | 190 kg | Jonathan Ramos; Mexico | 190 kg |
| Total | Nathan Damron; United States | 340 kg | Jonathan Ramos; Mexico | 337 kg | Wilmer Contreras; Ecuador | 334 kg |
102 kg
| Snatch | Marco Machado; Brazil | 166 kg | Ryan Sester; United States | 165 kg | Luis Lamenza; Puerto Rico | 161 kg |
| Clean & Jerk | Ryan Sester; United States | 207 kg | Marco Machado; Brazil | 194 kg | Jhohan Sanguino; Venezuela | 189 kg |
| Total | Ryan Sester; United States | 372 kg | Marco Machado; Brazil | 360 kg | Luis Lamenza; Puerto Rico | 348 kg |
109 kg
| Snatch | Wesley Kitts; United States | 165 kg | Josué Medina; Mexico | 162 kg | Dayan Aguirre; Mexico | 146 kg |
| Clean & Jerk | Josué Medina; Mexico | 201 kg | Wesley Kitts; United States | 200 kg | Hernán Viera; Peru | 195 kg |
| Total | Wesley Kitts; United States | 365 kg | Josué Medina; Mexico | 363 kg | Hernán Viera; Peru | 337 kg |
+109 kg
| Snatch | Dixon Arroyo; Ecuador | 174 kg | Alejandro Medina; United States | 173 kg | Caine Wilkes; United States | 172 kg |
| Clean & Jerk | Caine Wilkes; United States | 212 kg | Alejandro Medina; United States | 212 kg | Gilberto Lemus; Guatemala | 200 kg |
| Total | Alejandro Medina; United States | 385 kg | Caine Wilkes; United States | 384 kg | Dixon Arroyo; Ecuador | 374 kg |

=== Women ===
| Event | Gold | | Silver | | Bronze | |
45 kg
| Snatch | Rosielis Quintana; Venezuela | 71 kg | María Barco; Mexico | 69 kg | Not awarded | |
| Clean & Jerk | Rosielis Quintana; Venezuela | 89 kg | María Barco; Mexico | 88 kg | Not awarded | |
| Total | Rosielis Quintana; Venezuela | 160 kg | María Barco; Mexico | 157 kg | Not awarded | |
49 kg
| Snatch | Jourdan Delacruz; United States | 86 kg | Hayley Reichardt; United States | 86 kg | Andrea de la Herrán; Mexico | 85 kg |
| Clean & Jerk | Jourdan Delacruz; United States | 112 kg AM | Hayley Reichardt; United States | 111 kg | Yesica Hernández; Mexico | 101 kg |
| Total | Jourdan Delacruz; United States | 198 kg | Hayley Reichardt; United States | 197 kg | Yesica Hernández; Mexico | 182 kg |
55 kg
| Snatch | Shoely Mego; Peru | 85 kg | Josée Gallant; Canada | 84 kg | Ana López; Mexico | 82 kg |
| Clean & Jerk | Shoely Mego; Peru | 107 kg | Jennifer Hernández; Ecuador | 106 kg | Josée Gallant; Canada | 105 kg |
| Total | Shoely Mego; Peru | 192 kg | Josée Gallant; Canada | 189 kg | Jennifer Hernández; Ecuador | 187 kg |
59 kg
| Snatch | Maude Charron; Canada | 101 kg | Danielle Gunnin; United States | 100 kg | Taylor Wilkins; United States | 96 kg |
| Clean & Jerk | Maude Charron; Canada | 124 kg | Daphne Guillén; Mexico | 122 kg | Janeth Gómez; Mexico | 121 kg |
| Total | Maude Charron; Canada | 225 kg | Danielle Gunnin; United States | 220 kg | Daphne Guillén; Mexico | 217 kg |
64 kg
| Snatch | Tatiana Ullua; Argentina | 92 kg | Sema Ludrick; Nicaragua | 88 kg | Nadia Yangui; Canada | 86 kg |
| Clean & Jerk | Tatiana Ullua; Argentina | 111 kg | Sema Ludrick; Nicaragua | 110 kg | Nadia Yangui; Canada | 107 kg |
| Total | Tatiana Ullua; Argentina | 203 kg | Sema Ludrick; Nicaragua | 198 kg | Nadia Yangui; Canada | 193 kg |
71 kg
| Snatch | Angie Palacios; Ecuador | 111 kg | Katherine Nye; United States | 110 kg | Olivia Reeves; United States | 108 kg |
| Clean & Jerk | Olivia Reeves; United States | 139 kg | Katherine Nye; United States | 138 kg | Angie Palacios; Ecuador | 137 kg |
| Total | Angie Palacios; Ecuador | 248 kg | Katherine Nye; United States | 248 kg | Olivia Reeves; United States | 247 kg |
76 kg
| Snatch | Lizbeth Nolasco; Mexico | 106 kg | Bella Paredes; Ecuador | 105 kg | Kelin Jiménez; Ecuador | 105 kg |
| Clean & Jerk | Meredith Alwine; United States | 136 kg | Bella Paredes; Ecuador | 132 kg | Kelin Jiménez; Ecuador | 130 kg |
| Total | Meredith Alwine; United States | 238 kg | Bella Paredes; Ecuador | 237 kg | Kelin Jiménez; Ecuador | 235 kg |
81 kg
| Snatch | Neisi Dájomes; Ecuador | 115 kg | Ayamey Medina; Cuba | 113 kg | Tamara Salazar; Ecuador | 110 kg |
| Clean & Jerk | Tamara Salazar; Ecuador | 143 kg | Neisi Dájomes; Ecuador | 141 kg | Ayamey Medina; Cuba | 141 kg |
| Total | Neisi Dájomes; Ecuador | 256 kg | Ayamey Medina; Cuba | 254 kg | Tamara Salazar; Ecuador | 253 kg |
87 kg
| Snatch | Dayana Mina; Ecuador | 100 kg | Laura Jiménez; Mexico | 97 kg | Cecilia Rodríguez; Uruguay | 92 kg |
| Clean & Jerk | Dayana Mina; Ecuador | 133 kg | Laura Jiménez; Mexico | 121 kg | Cecilia Rodríguez; Uruguay | 105 kg |
| Total | Dayana Mina; Ecuador | 233 kg | Laura Jiménez; Mexico | 218 kg | Cecilia Rodríguez; Uruguay | 197 kg |
+87 kg
| Snatch | Sarah Robles; United States | 120 kg | Mary Theisen-Lappen; United States | 114 kg | Naryury Pérez; Venezuela | 111 kg |
| Clean & Jerk | Mary Theisen-Lappen; United States | 158 kg | Lisseth Ayoví; Ecuador | 153 kg | Sarah Robles; United States | 151 kg |
| Total | Mary Theisen-Lappen; United States | 272 kg | Sarah Robles; United States | 271 kg | Naryury Pérez; Venezuela | 256 kg |

== Medal table ==
Ranking by Big (Total result) medals

* Host nation (Argentina)

| Rank | Nation | Gold | Silver | Bronze | Total |
|---|---|---|---|---|---|
| 1 | United States | 8 | 6 | 1 | 15 |
| 2 | Venezuela | 4 | 0 | 1 | 5 |
| 3 | Ecuador | 3 | 2 | 5 | 10 |
| 4 | Mexico | 1 | 5 | 3 | 9 |
| 5 | Canada | 1 | 1 | 3 | 5 |
| 6 | Argentina* | 1 | 1 | 0 | 2 |
| 6 | Nicaragua | 1 | 1 | 0 | 2 |
| 8 | Peru | 1 | 0 | 3 | 4 |
| 9 | Cuba | 0 | 3 | 0 | 3 |
| 10 | Brazil | 0 | 1 | 0 | 1 |
| 11 | Puerto Rico | 0 | 0 | 2 | 2 |
| 12 | Uruguay | 0 | 0 | 1 | 1 |
| Totals (12 entries) | | 20 | 20 | 19 | 59 |

Ranking by all medals: Big (Total result) and Small (Snatch and Clean & Jerk)

| Rank | Nation | Gold | Silver | Bronze | Total |
|---|---|---|---|---|---|
| 1 | United States | 20 | 19 | 6 | 45 |
| 2 | Venezuela | 12 | 0 | 3 | 15 |
| 3 | Ecuador | 9 | 10 | 10 | 29 |
| 4 | Mexico | 6 | 14 | 12 | 32 |
| 5 | Canada | 3 | 3 | 8 | 14 |
| 6 | Argentina* | 3 | 3 | 0 | 6 |
| 6 | Nicaragua | 3 | 3 | 0 | 6 |
| 8 | Peru | 3 | 0 | 6 | 9 |
| 9 | Brazil | 1 | 2 | 1 | 4 |
| 10 | Cuba | 0 | 6 | 2 | 8 |
| 11 | Puerto Rico | 0 | 0 | 5 | 5 |
| 12 | Uruguay | 0 | 0 | 3 | 3 |
| 13 | Guatemala | 0 | 0 | 1 | 1 |
| Totals (13 entries) | | 60 | 60 | 57 | 177 |

== Team ranking ==
=== Men ===
| Rank | Team | Points |
|---|---|---|
| 1 | Mexico | 704 |
| 2 | United States | 698 |
| 3 | Argentina | 589 |
| 4 | Canada | 409 |
| 5 | Ecuador | 345 |
| 6 | Venezuela | 317 |

=== Women ===
| Rank | Team | Points |
|---|---|---|
| 1 | United States | 702 |
| 2 | Canada | 636 |
| 3 | Mexico | 618 |
| 4 | Argentina | 589 |
| 5 | Ecuador | 576 |
| 6 | Venezuela | 467 |
