= 2019 World Weightlifting Championships – Women's 71 kg =

The women's 71 kg competition at the 2019 World Weightlifting Championships was held on 23 September 2019.

== Schedule ==
Date	Time	Event
23 September 2019	12:00	Group B
23 September 2019	17:55	Group A

== Medalists ==
Event	Gold		Silver		Bronze	
Snatch	Katherine Nye (USA)	112 kg	Kim Hyo-sim (PRK)	110 kg	Mattie Rogers (USA)	106 kg
Clean & Jerk	Katherine Nye (USA)	136 kg	Mattie Rogers (USA)	134 kg	Emily Muskett (GBR)	126 kg
Total	Katherine Nye (USA)	248 kg	Mattie Rogers (USA)	240 kg	Kim Hyo-sim (PRK)	230 kg

== Records ==
Prior to this competition, the existing world records were as follows.

World Record	Snatch	World Standard	117 kg	—	1 November 2018
World Record	Clean & Jerk	Zhang Wangli (CHN)	152 kg	Ashgabat, Turkmenistan	6 November 2018
World Record	Total	Zhang Wangli (CHN)	267 kg	Ashgabat, Turkmenistan	6 November 2018

== Results ==
Rank	Athlete	Group	Snatch (kg)				Clean & Jerk (kg)				Total
Rank	Athlete	Group	1	2	3	Rank	1	2	3	Rank	Total
1st place, gold medalist(s)	Katherine Nye (USA)	A	~~106~~	107	112	1st place, gold medalist(s)	131	136	~~141~~	1st place, gold medalist(s)	248
2nd place, silver medalist(s)	Mattie Rogers (USA)	A	103	106	~~108~~	3rd place, bronze medalist(s)	130	134	~~137~~	2nd place, silver medalist(s)	240
3rd place, bronze medalist(s)	Kim Hyo-sim (PRK)	A	106	110	~~113~~	2nd place, silver medalist(s)	120	~~125~~	—	6	230
4	Emily Muskett (GBR)	A	94	97	100	4	124	126	~~131~~	3rd place, bronze medalist(s)	226
5	Anastasia Anzorova (RUS)	A	95	99	~~102~~	5	120	~~126~~	~~128~~	7	219
6	Maya Laylor (CAN)	A	94	~~97~~	~~97~~	7	120	124	~~126~~	4	218
7	Yekaterina Bykova (KAZ)	A	88	91	~~93~~	10	117	120	~~124~~	8	211
8	Kristel Macrohon (PHI)	A	90	~~95~~	~~95~~	12	120	~~125~~	~~125~~	5	210
9	Ecaterina Tretiacova (MDA)	A	88	92	94	8	110	114	~~116~~	10	208
10	Nicole Rubanovich (ISR)	A	93	96	~~98~~	6	105	108	~~111~~	14	204
11	Jolanta Wiór (POL)	A	~~91~~	91	93	9	~~111~~	~~111~~	111	11	204
12	Nadia Yangui (CAN)	B	83	86	89	14	110	114	~~117~~	9	203
13	Gintarė Bražaitė (LTU)	B	88	~~90~~	90	11	105	110	~~114~~	12	200
14	Sally Bennett (GBR)	B	89	~~92~~	~~92~~	13	~~107~~	107	~~112~~	15	196
15	Marina Ohman (ISR)	B	84	88	~~90~~	15	99	102	104	19	192
16	Elham Hosseini (IRI)	A	83	~~90~~	~~91~~	21	103	108	~~112~~	13	191
17	Yasmin Zammit Stevens (MLT)	B	82	~~85~~	85	18	102	105	~~107~~	17	190
18	Nina Rondziková (SVK)	B	80	~~84~~	84	20	100	104	106	16	190
19	Lijana Jakaitė (LTU)	B	81	~~84~~	85	17	100	104	~~108~~	18	189
20	Simona Hertlová (CZE)	B	84	~~87~~	~~87~~	19	102	~~105~~	~~107~~	20	186
21	Julie Nielsen (DEN)	B	82	~~85~~	87	16	95	~~99~~	~~99~~	23	182
22	Mette Pedersen (DEN)	B	~~80~~	80	~~83~~	22	92	96	~~98~~	22	176
23	Katey Byrd (IRL)	B	74	~~77~~	77	24	94	97	~~100~~	21	174
24	Abrisham Arjomandkhah (IRI)	B	73	77	~~81~~	23	93	~~98~~	~~99~~	24	170
