= 2021 Pan American Weightlifting Championships =

Pan American Weightlifting Championships 2021

2021 Pan American Championships
- Venue: Voltaire Paladines Polo Coliseum
- Location: Guayaquil, Ecuador
- Dates: 3–7 November

The 2021 Pan American Weightlifting Championships were held in Guayaquil, Ecuador from 3 to 7 November 2021.

== Medal summary ==
=== Men ===
Event	Gold		Silver		Bronze	
55 kg
Snatch	Miguel Suárez; Colombia	107 kg	Winder Sánchez; Venezuela	106 kg	José Poox; Mexico	101 kg
Clean & Jerk	Miguel Suárez; Colombia	137 kg	Winder Sánchez; Venezuela	136 kg	José Poox; Mexico	128 kg
Total	Miguel Suárez; Colombia	244 kg	Winder Sánchez; Venezuela	242 kg	José Poox; Mexico	229 kg
61 kg
Snatch	Thiago Silva; Brazil	118 kg	Breylin Pacheco; Dominican Republic	118 kg	Hampton Morris; United States	117 kg
Clean & Jerk	Hampton Morris; United States	151 kg	Víctor Guemez; Mexico	150 kg	Thiago Silva; Brazil	149 kg
Total	Hampton Morris; United States	268 kg	Thiago Silva; Brazil	267 kg	Víctor Guemez; Mexico	267 kg
67 kg
Snatch	Luis Javier Mosquera; Colombia	145 kg	Francisco Mosquera; Colombia	140 kg	Jair Reyes; Ecuador	133 kg
Clean & Jerk	Francisco Mosquera; Colombia	180 kg	Luis Javier Mosquera; Colombia	172 kg	Luis Bardalez; Peru	168 kg
Total	Francisco Mosquera; Colombia	320 kg	Luis Javier Mosquera; Colombia	317 kg	Jair Reyes; Ecuador	301 kg
73 kg
Snatch	Julio Cedeño; Dominican Republic	141 kg	Jacob Horst; United States	137 kg	Isaías Portilla; Ecuador	130 kg
Clean & Jerk	Julio Cedeño; Dominican Republic	174 kg	Josué Aguilar; Mexico	173 kg	Jacob Horst; United States	163 kg
Total	Julio Cedeño; Dominican Republic	315 kg	Josué Aguilar; Mexico	301 kg	Jacob Horst; United States	300 kg
81 kg
Snatch	Brayan Rodallegas; Colombia	160 kg	Iván Escudero; Ecuador	152 kg	Josué Ferreira; Brazil	151 kg
Clean & Jerk	Brayan Rodallegas; Colombia	187 kg	Darvin Castro; Venezuela	186 kg	Josué Ferreira; Brazil	183 kg
Total	Brayan Rodallegas; Colombia	347 kg	Darvin Castro; Venezuela	335 kg	Josué Ferreira; Brazil	334 kg
89 kg
Snatch	Jhor Moreno; Colombia	165 kg	Diego Betancur; Colombia	160 kg	Beau Brown; United States	151 kg
Clean & Jerk	Diego Betancur; Colombia	200 kg	Jhor Moreno; Colombia	197 kg	Beau Brown; United States	184 kg
Total	Jhor Moreno; Colombia	362 kg	Diego Betancur; Colombia	360 kg	Beau Brown; United States	335 kg
96 kg
Snatch	Keydomar Vallenilla; Venezuela	174 kg	Nathan Damron; United States	163 kg	Wilmer Contreras; Ecuador	148 kg
Clean & Jerk	Keydomar Vallenilla; Venezuela	214 kg AM	Nathan Damron; United States	208 kg	Andrés Serna; Colombia	195 kg
Total	Keydomar Vallenilla; Venezuela	388 kg	Nathan Damron; United States	371 kg	Wilmer Contreras; Ecuador	337 kg
102 kg
Snatch	Lesman Paredes; Colombia	181 kg AM	Marco Gregório; Brazil	165 kg	Luis Lamenza; Puerto Rico	157 kg
Clean & Jerk	Lesman Paredes; Colombia	205 kg	Serafim Veli; Brazil	193 kg	Marco Gregório; Brazil	190 kg
Total	Lesman Paredes; Colombia	386 kg	Marco Gregório; Brazil	355 kg	Serafim Veli; Brazil	348 kg
109 kg
Snatch	Rafael Cerro; Colombia	172 kg	Josué Medina; Mexico	160 kg	Hernán Viera; Peru	156 kg
Clean & Jerk	Hernán Viera; Peru	205 kg	Josué Medina; Mexico	190 kg	Richard Davidson; Canada	190 kg
Total	Hernán Viera; Peru	361 kg	Josué Medina; Mexico	350 kg	Richard Davidson; Canada	337 kg
+109 kg
Snatch	Santiago Cossio; Colombia	182 kg	Keiser Witte; United States	181 kg	Dixon Arroyo; Ecuador	180 kg
Clean & Jerk	Raúl Manríquez; Mexico	215 kg	Keiser Witte; United States	215 kg	Gilberto Lemus; Guatemala	205 kg
Total	Keiser Witte; United States	396 kg	Raúl Manríquez; Mexico	392 kg	Santiago Cossio; Colombia	385 kg

=== Women ===
Event	Gold		Silver		Bronze	
45 kg
Snatch	Diana Chay; Mexico	70 kg	Rosielis Quintana; Venezuela	67 kg	Viviana Muñoz; Mexico	65 kg
Clean & Jerk	Diana Chay; Mexico	87 kg	Rosielis Quintana; Venezuela	86 kg	Viviana Muñoz; Mexico	83 kg
Total	Diana Chay; Mexico	157 kg	Rosielis Quintana; Venezuela	153 kg	Viviana Muñoz; Mexico	148 kg
49 kg
Snatch	Hayley Reichardt; United States	83 kg	Dahiana Ortiz; Dominican Republic	82 kg	Andrea de la Herrán; Mexico	81 kg
Clean & Jerk	Hayley Reichardt; United States	104 kg	Maddison Pannell; United States	102 kg	Dahiana Ortiz; Dominican Republic	100 kg
Total	Hayley Reichardt; United States	187 kg	Dahiana Ortiz; Dominican Republic	182 kg	Maddison Pannell; United States	177 kg
55 kg
Snatch	Nathalia Novas; Dominican Republic	87 kg	Génesis Rodríguez; Venezuela	86 kg	Rohelys Galvis; Colombia	85 kg
Clean & Jerk	Jennifer Hernández; Ecuador	107 kg	Nathalia Novas; Dominican Republic	106 kg	Letícia Moraes; Brazil	104 kg
Total	Nathalia Novas; Dominican Republic	193 kg	Jennifer Hernández; Ecuador	192 kg	Génesis Rodríguez; Venezuela	190 kg
59 kg
Snatch	Yenny Álvarez; Colombia	100 kg AM	Rosivé Silgado; Colombia	95 kg	Gilyeliz Guzmán; Puerto Rico	88 kg
Clean & Jerk	Yenny Álvarez; Colombia	130 kg AM	Rosivé Silgado; Colombia	120 kg	Gilyeliz Guzmán; Puerto Rico	115 kg
Total	Yenny Álvarez; Colombia	230 kg AM	Rosivé Silgado; Colombia	215 kg	Gilyeliz Guzmán; Puerto Rico	203 kg
64 kg
Snatch	Natalia Llamosa; Colombia	104 kg	Eva Gurrola; Mexico	98 kg	Taylor Wilkins; United States	92 kg
Clean & Jerk	Natalia Llamosa; Colombia	124 kg	Taylor Wilkins; United States	119 kg	Eva Gurrola; Mexico	113 kg
Total	Natalia Llamosa; Colombia	228 kg	Eva Gurrola; Mexico	211 kg	Taylor Wilkins; United States	211 kg
71 kg
Snatch	Miyareth Mendoza; Colombia	107 kg	Mari Sánchez; Colombia	106 kg	Meredith Alwine; United States	104 kg
Clean & Jerk	Meredith Alwine; United States	133 kg	Mariah Park; United States	131 kg	Ana Torres; Mexico	129 kg
Total	Meredith Alwine; United States	237 kg	Miyareth Mendoza; Colombia	235 kg	Mariah Park; United States	231 kg
76 kg
Snatch	Katherine Nye; United States	107 kg	Laura Amaro; Brazil	106 kg	Hellen Escobar; Colombia	104 kg
Clean & Jerk	Mattie Rogers; United States	134 kg	Katherine Nye; United States	133 kg	Hellen Escobar; Colombia	132 kg
Total	Katherine Nye; United States	240 kg	Mattie Rogers; United States	237 kg	Laura Amaro; Brazil	236 kg
81 kg
Snatch	Yudelina Mejía; Dominican Republic	111 kg	Valeria Rivas; Colombia	107 kg	Amanda Schott; Brazil	105 kg
Clean & Jerk	Valeria Rivas; Colombia	135 kg	Yudelina Mejía; Dominican Republic	130 kg	Amanda Schott; Brazil	121 kg
Total	Valeria Rivas; Colombia	242 kg	Yudelina Mejía; Dominican Republic	241 kg	Amanda Schott; Brazil	226 kg
87 kg
Snatch	Crismery Santana; Dominican Republic	111 kg	Yeinny Geles; Colombia	105 kg	Dayana Chirinos; Venezuela	104 kg
Clean & Jerk	Crismery Santana; Dominican Republic	136 kg	Dayana Chirinos; Venezuela	135 kg	Yeinny Geles; Colombia	132 kg
Total	Crismery Santana; Dominican Republic	247 kg	Dayana Chirinos; Venezuela	239 kg	Yeinny Geles; Colombia	237 kg
+87 kg
Snatch	Mary Theisen-Lappen; United States	117 kg	Lisseth Ayoví; Ecuador	113 kg	Gladis Bueno; Mexico	105 kg
Clean & Jerk	Mary Theisen-Lappen; United States	153 kg	Lisseth Ayoví; Ecuador	130 kg	Yaniuska Espinosa; Venezuela	130 kg
Total	Mary Theisen-Lappen; United States	270 kg	Lisseth Ayoví; Ecuador	243 kg	Gladis Bueno; Mexico	234 kg

== Medal table ==
Ranking by Big (Total result) medals

* Host nation (Ecuador)

Rank	Nation	Gold	Silver	Bronze	Total
1	Colombia	8	4	2	14
2	United States	6	2	5	13
3	Dominican Republic	3	2	0	5
4	Mexico	1	4	4	9
5	Venezuela	1	4	1	6
6	Peru	1	0	0	1
7	Brazil	0	2	4	6
8	Ecuador*	0	2	2	4
9	Canada	0	0	1	1
9	Puerto Rico	0	0	1	1
Totals (10 entries)		20	20	20	60

Ranking by all medals: Big (Total result) and Small (Snatch and Clean & Jerk)

* Host nation (Ecuador)

Rank	Nation	Gold	Silver	Bronze	Total
1	Colombia	26	13	7	46
2	United States	14	11	11	36
3	Dominican Republic	9	6	1	16
4	Mexico	4	9	12	25
5	Venezuela	3	11	3	17
6	Peru	2	0	2	4
7	Brazil	1	5	11	17
8	Ecuador*	1	5	6	12
9	Puerto Rico	0	0	4	4
10	Canada	0	0	2	2
11	Guatemala	0	0	1	1
Totals (11 entries)		60	60	60	180
