= 2019 Youth World Weightlifting Championships =

International weightlifting competition

- Venue: Westgate Las Vegas
- Location: Las Vegas, United States
- Dates: 8–15 March
- Competitors: 183 from 44 nations

The 2019 Youth World Weightlifting Championships was held at the Westgate Las Vegas in Las Vegas, United States from 8 March to 15 March 2019.

== Medals tables ==
Ranking by Big (Total result) medals

* Host nation (United States)

Rank	Nation	Gold	Silver	Bronze	Total
1	Kazakhstan	5	0	0	5
2	Uzbekistan	2	3	1	6
3	Turkey	2	2	2	6
4	Vietnam	2	0	1	3
5	Bulgaria	2	0	0	2
6	Mexico	1	2	2	5
7	Belgium	1	0	0	1
7	Czech Republic	1	0	0	1
7	Egypt	1	0	0	1
7	Italy	1	0	0	1
7	Saudi Arabia	1	0	0	1
7	Spain	1	0	0	1
13	United States*	0	3	2	5
14	Romania	0	2	2	4
15	Armenia	0	2	1	3
15	Chinese Taipei	0	2	1	3
17	Georgia	0	2	0	2
18	Peru	0	1	2	3
19	Turkmenistan	0	1	1	2
20	Azerbaijan	0	0	1	1
20	Ecuador	0	0	1	1
20	Greece	0	0	1	1
20	Japan	0	0	1	1
20	Syria	0	0	1	1
Totals (24 entries)		20	20	20	60

Ranking by all medals: Big (Total result) and Small (Snatch and Clean & Jerk)

* Host nation (United States)

Rank	Nation	Gold	Silver	Bronze	Total
1	Kazakhstan	11	4	0	15
2	Turkey	9	3	8	20
3	Uzbekistan	8	6	2	16
4	Vietnam	7	0	1	8
5	Bulgaria	5	1	0	6
6	Mexico	3	6	5	14
7	Egypt	3	0	0	3
7	Italy	3	0	0	3
7	Spain	3	0	0	3
10	Czech Republic	2	1	0	3
10	Saudi Arabia	2	1	0	3
12	Armenia	1	5	3	9
13	Chinese Taipei	1	5	1	7
14	Belgium	1	2	0	3
15	Azerbaijan	1	0	5	6
16	United States*	0	11	5	16
17	Georgia	0	5	0	5
18	Romania	0	4	8	12
19	Turkmenistan	0	3	1	4
20	Peru	0	2	5	7
21	Brazil	0	1	0	1
22	Ecuador	0	0	6	6
23	Japan	0	0	4	4
24	Syria	0	0	3	3
25	Greece	0	0	2	2
26	Mongolia	0	0	1	1
Totals (26 entries)		60	60	60	180

== Medal overview ==
=== Men ===
Event		Gold		Silver		Bronze	
– 49 kg	Snatch	Đỗ Tú Tùng (VIE)	95 kg YWR	Mustafa Erdoğan (TUR)	82 kg	Florin Krupla (ROU)	79 kg
– 49 kg	Clean & Jerk	Đỗ Tú Tùng (VIE)	125 kg YWR	Florin Krupla (ROU)	101 kg	Joe Vargas (ECU)	98 kg
– 49 kg	Total	Đỗ Tú Tùng (VIE)	220 kg YWR	Florin Krupla (ROU)	180 kg	Mustafa Erdoğan (TUR)	177 kg
– 55 kg	Snatch	Sergio Massidda (ITA)	103 kg	Ogabek Nafasov (UZB)	102 kg	Omar Javadov (AZE)	96 kg
– 55 kg	Clean & Jerk	Sergio Massidda (ITA)	125 kg	José Poox (MEX)	122 kg	Juan Antonio Barco (MEX)	121 kg
– 55 kg	Total	Sergio Massidda (ITA)	228 kg	Ogabek Nafasov (UZB)	223 kg	José Poox (MEX)	217 kg
– 61 kg	Snatch	Bùi Đình Sang (VIE)	113 kg	Sairamkez Akmolda (KAZ)	112 kg	Yusuf Fehmi Genç (TUR)	108 kg
– 61 kg	Clean & Jerk	Yusuf Fehmi Genç (TUR)	146 kg	Sairamkez Akmolda (KAZ)	145 kg	Andy Chávez (ECU)	134 kg
– 61 kg	Total	Sairamkez Akmolda (KAZ)	257 kg	Yusuf Fehmi Genç (TUR)	254 kg	Bùi Đình Sang (VIE)	243 kg
– 67 kg	Snatch	Saikhan Taisuyev (KAZ)	127 kg	Bektimur Reýimow (TKM)	122 kg	Rustam Gasimov (AZE)	121 kg
– 67 kg	Clean & Jerk	Saikhan Taisuyev (KAZ)	161 kg YWR	Gurami Giorbelidze (GEO)	150 kg	Ryan Grimsland (USA)	147 kg
– 67 kg	Total	Saikhan Taisuyev (KAZ)	288 kg	Gurami Giorbelidze (GEO)	270 kg	Bektimur Reýimow (TKM)	269 kg
– 73 kg	Snatch	Asadbek Narimanov (UZB)	133 kg	Karlos Nasar (BUL)	130 kg	Ramazan Zeydanlı (TUR)	124 kg
– 73 kg	Clean & Jerk	Karlos Nasar (BUL)	161 kg	Asadbek Narimanov (UZB)	154 kg	Amagiak Misakian (GRE)	154 kg
– 73 kg	Total	Karlos Nasar (BUL)	291 kg	Asadbek Narimanov (UZB)	287 kg	Amagiak Misakian (GRE)	272 kg
– 81 kg	Snatch	Yessenkeldi Sapi (KAZ)	134 kg	Dade Stanley (USA)	133 kg	Amel Atencia (PER)	122 kg
– 81 kg	Clean & Jerk	Yessenkeldi Sapi (KAZ)	175 kg	Dade Stanley (USA)	155 kg	Amel Atencia (PER)	152 kg
– 81 kg	Total	Yessenkeldi Sapi (KAZ)	309 kg	Dade Stanley (USA)	288 kg	Amel Atencia (PER)	274 kg
– 89 kg	Snatch	Garik Karapetyan (ARM)	137 kg	Ali Yousef Al-Othman (KSA)	136 kg	Gevorg Ghahramanyan (ARM)	134 kg
– 89 kg	Clean & Jerk	Ali Yousef Al-Othman (KSA)	171 kg	Gevorg Ghahramanyan (ARM)	170 kg	Garik Karapetyan (ARM)	168 kg
– 89 kg	Total	Ali Yousef Al-Othman (KSA)	307 kg	Garik Karapetyan (ARM)	305 kg	Gevorg Ghahramanyan (ARM)	304 kg
– 96 kg	Snatch	Onur Demirci (TUR)	145 kg	Rakhat Bekbolat (KAZ)	144 kg	Mirkhosil Mirzabaev (UZB)	143 kg
– 96 kg	Clean & Jerk	Rakhat Bekbolat (KAZ)	179 kg	Morgan McCullough (USA)	178 kg	Onur Demirci (TUR)	170 kg
– 96 kg	Total	Rakhat Bekbolat (KAZ)	323 kg	Onur Demirci (TUR)	315 kg	Mirkhosil Mirzabaev (UZB)	311 kg
– 102 kg	Snatch	Stefcho Hristov (BUL)	145 kg	Lasha Taktakishvili (GEO)	130 kg	Ali Shukurlu (AZE)	125 kg
– 102 kg	Clean & Jerk	Stefcho Hristov (BUL)	170 kg	Lasha Taktakishvili (GEO)	160 kg	Ali Shukurlu (AZE)	155 kg
– 102 kg	Total	Stefcho Hristov (BUL)	315 kg	Lasha Taktakishvili (GEO)	290 kg	Ali Shukurlu (AZE)	280 kg
+ 102 kg	Snatch	Dominik Oračko (CZE)	144 kg	Atajan Daýyýew (TKM)	143 kg	Ahmad Al-Ali (SYR)	136 kg
+ 102 kg	Clean & Jerk	Rahman Kazimov (AZE)	174 kg	Dominik Oračko (CZE)	174 kg	Ahmad Al-Ali (SYR)	173 kg
+ 102 kg	Total	Dominik Oračko (CZE)	318 kg	Atajan Daýyýew (TKM)	315 kg	Ahmad Al-Ali (SYR)	309 kg

=== Women ===
Event		Gold		Silver		Bronze	
– 40 kg	Snatch	Cansu Bektaş (TUR)	54 kg	Hong Zi-yu (TPE)	53 kg	Zeliha Ülker (TUR)	45 kg
– 40 kg	Clean & Jerk	Cansu Bektaş (TUR)	66 kg	Hong Zi-yu (TPE)	63 kg	Zeliha Ülker (TUR)	62 kg
– 40 kg	Total	Cansu Bektaş (TUR)	120 kg	Hong Zi-yu (TPE)	116 kg	Zeliha Ülker (TUR)	107 kg
– 45 kg	Snatch	Nguyễn Thị Thu Trang (VIE)	66 kg	Zeng Yi-fan (TPE)	58 kg	María Pinoargote (ECU)	57 kg
– 45 kg	Clean & Jerk	Nguyễn Thị Thu Trang (VIE)	75 kg	Analí Saldarriaga (PER)	74 kg	Bahar Korubeyi (TUR)	73 kg
– 45 kg	Total	Nguyễn Thị Thu Trang (VIE)	141 kg	Analí Saldarriaga (PER)	130 kg	Zeng Yi-fan (TPE)	128 kg
– 49 kg	Snatch	Nigora Abdullaeva (UZB)	75 kg	Mihaela Cambei (ROU)	73 kg	Emika Yamashita (JPN)	68 kg
– 49 kg	Clean & Jerk	Nigora Abdullaeva (UZB)	90 kg	Kaiya Bryant (USA)	87 kg	Mihaela Cambei (ROU)	86 kg
– 49 kg	Total	Nigora Abdullaeva (UZB)	165 kg	Mihaela Cambei (ROU)	159 kg	Kaiya Bryant (USA)	154 kg
– 55 kg	Snatch	Cansel Özkan (TUR)	79 kg	Nina Sterckx (BEL)	79 kg	Andreea Cotruţă (ROU)	76 kg
– 55 kg	Clean & Jerk	Chou Yuan-tzu (TPE)	97 kg	Nina Sterckx (BEL)	96 kg	Andreea Cotruţă (ROU)	95 kg
– 55 kg	Total	Nina Sterckx (BEL)	175 kg	Chou Yuan-tzu (TPE)	172 kg	Andreea Cotruţă (ROU)	171 kg
– 59 kg	Snatch	Neama Said (EGY)	88 kg	Nicole Cintra Lagos (BRA)	82 kg	Daphne Guillén (MEX)	82 kg
– 59 kg	Clean & Jerk	Neama Said (EGY)	107 kg	Mariana García (MEX)	107 kg	Daphne Guillén (MEX)	106 kg
– 59 kg	Total	Neama Said (EGY)	195 kg	Daphne Guillén (MEX)	188 kg	Mariana García (MEX)	188 kg
– 64 kg	Snatch	Kumushkhon Fayzullaeva (UZB)	93 kg	Queysi Rojas (MEX)	88 kg	Mihaela Ilie (ROU)	84 kg
– 64 kg	Clean & Jerk	Kumushkhon Fayzullaeva (UZB)	122 kg YWR	Queysi Rojas (MEX)	107 kg	Mihaela Ilie (ROU)	106 kg
– 64 kg	Total	Kumushkhon Fayzullaeva (UZB)	215 kg YWR	Queysi Rojas (MEX)	195 kg	Mihaela Ilie (ROU)	190 kg
– 71 kg	Snatch	Emmy Velázquez (MEX)	93 kg	Olivia Reeves (USA)	84 kg	Estrella Saldarriaga (PER)	83 kg
– 71 kg	Clean & Jerk	Emmy Velázquez (MEX)	121 kg	Olivia Reeves (USA)	110 kg	Gombosürengiin Enerel (MGL)	105 kg
– 71 kg	Total	Emmy Velázquez (MEX)	214 kg	Olivia Reeves (USA)	194 kg	Estrella Saldarriaga (PER)	185 kg
– 76 kg	Snatch	Dilara Narin (TUR)	96 kg	Liana Gyurjyan (ARM)	92 kg	Bella Paredes (ECU)	90 kg
– 76 kg	Clean & Jerk	Dilara Narin (TUR)	129 kg YWR	Liana Gyurjyan (ARM)	116 kg	Bella Paredes (ECU)	110 kg
– 76 kg	Total	Dilara Narin (TUR)	225 kg	Liana Gyurjyan (ARM)	208 kg	Bella Paredes (ECU)	200 kg
– 81 kg	Snatch	Tursunoy Jabborova (UZB)	96 kg	Olga Pastukhova (KAZ)	92 kg	Motoka Nakajima (JPN)	86 kg
– 81 kg	Clean & Jerk	Olga Pastukhova (KAZ)	123 kg	Tursunoy Jabborova (UZB)	118 kg	Motoka Nakajima (JPN)	109 kg
– 81 kg	Total	Olga Pastukhova (KAZ)	215 kg	Tursunoy Jabborova (UZB)	214 kg	Motoka Nakajima (JPN)	195 kg
+ 81 kg	Snatch	Irene Blanco (ESP)	91 kg	Julia Yun (USA)	90 kg	Nia Walker (USA)	86 kg
+ 81 kg	Clean & Jerk	Irene Blanco (ESP)	112 kg	Nia Walker (USA)	110 kg	Julia Yun (USA)	109 kg
+ 81 kg	Total	Irene Blanco (ESP)	203 kg	Julia Yun (USA)	199 kg	Nia Walker (USA)	196 kg

== Team ranking ==
=== Men ===
Rank	Team	Points
1	United States	561
2	Turkey	460
3	Mexico	429
4	Kazakhstan	327
5	Azerbaijan	322
6	Chinese Taipei	290

=== Women ===
Rank	Team	Points
1	United States	657
2	Turkey	573
3	Chinese Taipei	556
4	Mexico	415
5	Peru	333
6	Uzbekistan	305

== Participating nations ==
A total of 183 competitors from 44 nations participate.

- Argentina (1)
- Armenia (3)
- Australia (6)
- Austria (1)
- Azerbaijan (5)
- Barbados (1)
- Belgium (2)
- Brazil (2)
- Bulgaria (3)
- Cameroon (2)
- Canada (1)
- Chile (1)
- Chinese Taipei (14)
- Czech Republic (2)
- Ecuador (8)
- Egypt (1)
- Georgia (3)
- Great Britain (5)
- Greece (5)
- Guatemala (2)
- Hungary (1)
- Israel (1)
- Italy (1)
- Japan (4)
- Kazakhstan (5)
- Kosovo (1)
- Mauritius (2)
- Mexico (13)
- Mongolia (2)
- Peru (10)
- Puerto Rico (1)
- Romania (5)
- Saudi Arabia (3)
- Slovakia (1)
- Spain (3)
- Sri Lanka (2)
- Syria (5)
- Tonga (2)
- Turkey (16)
- Turkmenistan (4)
- Uganda (2)
- United States (20)
- Uzbekistan (7)
- Vietnam (4)
