= 2020 Pan American Weightlifting Championships =

International weightlifting competition

2020 Pan American Championships
- Venue: Weightlifting Pavilion Dr. José Joaquín Puello
- Location: Santo Domingo, Dominican Republic
- Dates: 19–24 April 2021

The 2020 Pan American Weightlifting Championships were held in Santo Domingo, Dominican Republic from 19 to 24 April 2021.

== Medal summary ==
=== Men ===
Event	Gold		Silver		Bronze	
55 kg
Snatch	Yeison Michel; Dominican Republic	105 kg	Miguel Suárez; Colombia	105 kg	José Poox; Mexico	97 kg
Clean & Jerk	Miguel Suárez; Colombia	137 kg AM	José Poox; Mexico	133 kg	Yeison Michel; Dominican Republic	132 kg
Total	Miguel Suárez; Colombia	242 kg	Yeison Michel; Dominican Republic	237 kg	José Poox; Mexico	230 kg
61 kg
Snatch	Francisco Mosquera; Colombia	124 kg	Luis García; Dominican Republic	122 kg	Otto Oñate; Cuba	120 kg
Clean & Jerk	Francisco Mosquera; Colombia	156 kg	Otto Oñate; Cuba	156 kg	Arley Calderón; Cuba	155 kg
Total	Francisco Mosquera; Colombia	280 kg	Otto Oñate; Cuba	276 kg	Arley Calderón; Cuba	274 kg
67 kg
Snatch	Luis Javier Mosquera; Colombia	145 kg	Jonathan Muñoz; Mexico	142 kg	Luis Higuita; Colombia	136 kg
Clean & Jerk	Luis Javier Mosquera; Colombia	173 kg	Edgar Pineda; Guatemala	172 kg	Jonathan Muñoz; Mexico	168 kg
Total	Luis Javier Mosquera; Colombia	318 kg	Jonathan Muñoz; Mexico	310 kg	Edgar Pineda; Guatemala	307 kg
73 kg
Snatch	Julio Mayora; Venezuela	156 kg AM	Clarence Cummings; United States	155 kg	Jorge Cárdenas; Mexico	149 kg
Clean & Jerk	Clarence Cummings; United States	188 kg	Julio Mayora; Venezuela	185 kg	Jorge Cárdenas; Mexico	170 kg
Total	Clarence Cummings; United States	343 kg	Julio Mayora; Venezuela	341 kg	Jorge Cárdenas; Mexico	319 kg
81 kg
Snatch	Brayan Rodallegas; Colombia	168 kg AM	Zacarías Bonnat; Dominican Republic	164 kg	Harrison Maurus; United States	150 kg
Clean & Jerk	Zacarías Bonnat; Dominican Republic	196 kg	Brayan Rodallegas; Colombia	195 kg	Harrison Maurus; United States	190 kg
Total	Brayan Rodallegas; Colombia	363 kg	Zacarías Bonnat; Dominican Republic	360 kg	Harrison Maurus; United States	340 kg
89 kg
Snatch	Diego Betancur; Colombia	165 kg	Olfides Sáez; Cuba	160 kg	Yeimar Mendoza; Colombia	157 kg
Clean & Jerk	Diego Betancur; Colombia	200 kg	Olfides Sáez; Cuba	195 kg	Yeimar Mendoza; Colombia	190 kg
Total	Diego Betancur; Colombia	365 kg	Olfides Sáez; Cuba	355 kg	Yeimar Mendoza; Colombia	347 kg
96 kg
Snatch	Boady Santavy; Canada	181 kg AM	Jhonatan Rivas; Colombia	180 kg	Keydomar Vallenilla; Venezuela	175 kg
Clean & Jerk	Jhonatan Rivas; Colombia	213 kg	Boady Santavy; Canada	208 kg	Nathan Damron; United States	207 kg
Total	Jhonatan Rivas; Colombia	393 kg	Boady Santavy; Canada	389 kg	Nathan Damron; United States	374 kg
102 kg
Snatch	Lesman Paredes; Colombia	180 kg AM	Juan Zaldívar; Cuba	159 kg	Jason Bonnick; United States	155 kg
Clean & Jerk	Lesman Paredes; Colombia	210 kg AM	Juan Zaldívar; Cuba	198 kg	Javier Azcatl; Mexico	197 kg
Total	Lesman Paredes; Colombia	390 kg AM	Juan Zaldívar; Cuba	357 kg	Jason Bonnick; United States	347 kg
109 kg
Snatch	Rafael Cerro; Colombia	170 kg	Juan Columbié; Cuba	166 kg	Wesley Kitts; United States	160 kg
Clean & Jerk	Juan Columbié; Cuba	209 kg	Hernán Viera; Peru	206 kg	Jesús González; Venezuela	200 kg
Total	Juan Columbié; Cuba	375 kg	Rafael Cerro; Colombia	370 kg	Hernán Viera; Peru	361 kg
+109 kg
Snatch	Fernando Reis; Brazil	190 kg	Caine Wilkes; United States	176 kg	Raúl Manríquez; Mexico	175 kg
Clean & Jerk	Fernando Reis; Brazil	235 kg	Caine Wilkes; United States	212 kg	Raúl Manríquez; Mexico	205 kg
Total	Fernando Reis; Brazil	425 kg	Caine Wilkes; United States	388 kg	Raúl Manríquez; Mexico	380 kg

=== Women ===
Event	Gold		Silver		Bronze	
45 kg
Snatch	Cicely Kyle; United States	70 kg	Diana Chay; Mexico	69 kg	Viviana Muñoz; Mexico	65 kg
Clean & Jerk	Cicely Kyle; United States	96 kg	Diana Chay; Mexico	86 kg	Viviana Muñoz; Mexico	84 kg
Total	Cicely Kyle; United States	166 kg	Diana Chay; Mexico	155 kg	Viviana Muñoz; Mexico	149 kg
49 kg
Snatch	Jourdan Delacruz; United States	89 kg AM	Dahiana Ortiz; Dominican Republic	82 kg	Hayley Reichardt; United States	82 kg
Clean & Jerk	Jourdan Delacruz; United States	111 kg AM	Hayley Reichardt; United States	107 kg	Manuela Berrío; Colombia	101 kg
Total	Jourdan Delacruz; United States	200 kg AM	Hayley Reichardt; United States	189 kg	Manuela Berrío; Colombia	180 kg
55 kg
Snatch	Génesis Rodríguez; Venezuela	92 kg	Ana López; Mexico	91 kg	Nathalia Novas; Dominican Republic	90 kg
Clean & Jerk	Ana López; Mexico	109 kg	Nathalia Novas; Dominican Republic	107 kg	Shoely Mego; Peru	106 kg
Total	Ana López; Mexico	200 kg	Génesis Rodríguez; Venezuela	197 kg	Nathalia Novas; Dominican Republic	197 kg
59 kg
Snatch	Rosivé Silgado; Colombia	97 kg	Alexandra Escobar; Ecuador	96 kg	María Lobón; Colombia	95 kg
Clean & Jerk	Yusleidy Figueroa; Venezuela	125 kg	Janeth Gómez; Mexico	124 kg	Taylor Wilkins; United States	122 kg
Total	Yusleidy Figueroa; Venezuela	218 kg	Rosivé Silgado; Colombia	217 kg	Taylor Wilkins; United States	217 kg
64 kg
Snatch	Maude Charron; Canada	107 kg AM	Angie Palacios; Ecuador	105 kg	Mercedes Pérez; Colombia	104 kg
Clean & Jerk	Maude Charron; Canada	133 kg AM	Mercedes Pérez; Colombia	130 kg	Mattie Sasser; United States	125 kg
Total	Maude Charron; Canada	240 kg AM	Mercedes Pérez; Colombia	234 kg	Angie Palacios; Ecuador	225 kg
71 kg
Snatch	Mari Sánchez; Colombia	105 kg	Mailyng Echeverría; Colombia	104 kg	Meredith Alwine; United States	103 kg
Clean & Jerk	Meredith Alwine; United States	135 kg	Mailyng Echeverría; Colombia	126 kg	Mari Sánchez; Colombia	126 kg
Total	Meredith Alwine; United States	238 kg	Mari Sánchez; Colombia	231 kg	Mailyng Echeverría; Colombia	230 kg
76 kg
Snatch	Neisi Dájomes; Ecuador	115 kg	Katherine Nye; United States	105 kg	Aremi Fuentes; Mexico	103 kg
Clean & Jerk	Neisi Dájomes; Ecuador	135 kg	Katherine Nye; United States	130 kg	Anacarmen Torres; Mexico	130 kg
Total	Neisi Dájomes; Ecuador	250 kg	Katherine Nye; United States	235 kg	Anacarmen Torres; Mexico	233 kg
81 kg
Snatch	Mattie Rogers; United States	111 kg AM	Jessie Stemo; United States	108 kg	Yudelina Mejía; Dominican Republic	106 kg
Clean & Jerk	Leydi Solís; Colombia	141 kg	Mattie Rogers; United States	140 kg	Yudelina Mejía; Dominican Republic	136 kg
Total	Mattie Rogers; United States	251 kg AM	Leydi Solís; Colombia	247 kg	Jessie Stemo; United States	242 kg
87 kg
Snatch	Crismery Santana; Dominican Republic	115 kg	Tamara Salazar; Ecuador	110 kg	Naryury Pérez; Venezuela	110 kg
Clean & Jerk	Tamara Salazar; Ecuador	146 kg	Crismery Santana; Dominican Republic	142 kg	Dayana Chirinos; Venezuela	138 kg
Total	Crismery Santana; Dominican Republic	257 kg	Tamara Salazar; Ecuador	256 kg	Dayana Chirinos; Venezuela	247 kg
+87 kg
Snatch	Sarah Robles; United States	125 kg	Yaniuska Espinosa; Venezuela	116 kg	Lisseth Ayoví; Ecuador	115 kg
Clean & Jerk	Sarah Robles; United States	155 kg	Yaniuska Espinosa; Venezuela	146 kg	Lisseth Ayoví; Ecuador	145 kg
Total	Sarah Robles; United States	280 kg	Yaniuska Espinosa; Venezuela	262 kg	Lisseth Ayoví; Ecuador	260 kg

== Medal table ==
Ranking by Big (Total result) medals

* Host nation (Dominican Republic)

Rank	Nation	Gold	Silver	Bronze	Total
1	Colombia	7	5	3	15
2	United States	6	3	5	14
3	Cuba	1	3	1	5
3	Venezuela	1	3	1	5
5	Mexico	1	2	5	8
6	Dominican Republic*	1	2	1	4
7	Ecuador	1	1	2	4
8	Canada	1	1	0	2
9	Brazil	1	0	0	1
10	Guatemala	0	0	1	1
10	Peru	0	0	1	1
Totals (11 entries)		20	20	20	60

Ranking by all medals: Big (Total result) and Small (Snatch and Clean & Jerk)

* Host nation (Dominican Republic)

Rank	Nation	Gold	Silver	Bronze	Total
1	Colombia	22	11	10	43
2	United States	15	11	14	40
3	Dominican Republic*	4	7	6	17
4	Venezuela	4	6	5	15
5	Ecuador	4	4	4	12
6	Canada	4	2	0	6
7	Brazil	3	0	0	3
8	Cuba	2	9	3	14
9	Mexico	2	8	16	26
10	Peru	0	1	2	3
11	Guatemala	0	1	1	2
Totals (11 entries)		60	60	61	181

== Team ranking ==
=== Men ===
Rank	Team	Points
1	Colombia	706
2	Cuba	675
3	United States	628
4		
5		
6		

=== Women ===
Rank	Team	Points
1	United States	762
2	Colombia	692
3	Mexico	628
4		
5		
6		
