= 2019 Pan American Weightlifting Championships =

International weightlifting competition

2019 Pan American Championships
- Host city: Guatemala City, Guatemala
- Dates: 23–27 April

The 2019 Pan American Weightlifting Championships was held in Guatemala City, Guatemala from 23 to 27 April 2019.

== Medal summary ==
=== Men ===
Event	Gold		Silver		Bronze	
55 kg
Snatch	Jairo García; Colombia	108 kg	Edwar Yosef; Haiti	100 kg	José Ical; Guatemala	95 kg
Clean & Jerk	Jairo García; Colombia	135 kg	José Ical; Guatemala	120 kg		
Total	Jairo García; Colombia	243 kg	José Ical; Guatemala	215 kg		
61 kg
Snatch	Cristhian Zurita; Ecuador	124 kg	Luis García; Dominican Republic	123 kg	Otto Oñate; Cuba	121 kg
Clean & Jerk	Antonio Vázquez; Mexico	164 kg	Luis García; Dominican Republic	158 kg	Arley Calderón; Cuba	150 kg
Total	Antonio Vázquez; Mexico	282 kg	Luis García; Dominican Republic	281 kg	Cristhian Zurita; Ecuador	272 kg
67 kg
Snatch	José Osorio; Colombia	135 kg	Jonathan Muñoz; Mexico	134 kg	Jordan Wissinger; United States	130 kg
Clean & Jerk	Jonathan Muñoz; Mexico	170 kg	Edgar Pineda; Guatemala	166 kg	Luis Bardalez; Peru	161 kg
Total	Jonathan Muñoz; Mexico	304 kg	José Osorio; Colombia	295 kg	Edgar Pineda; Guatemala	291 kg
73 kg
Snatch	Clarence Cummings; United States	153 kg AM, JWR	Luis Javier Mosquera; Colombia	147 kg	José Gavino; Colombia	142 kg
Clean & Jerk	Clarence Cummings; United States	191 kg AM, JWR	José Gavino; Colombia	177 kg	Luis Javier Mosquera; Colombia	175 kg
Total	Clarence Cummings; United States	344 kg AM, JWR	Luis Javier Mosquera; Colombia	322 kg	José Gavino; Colombia	319 kg
81 kg
Snatch	Brayan Rodallegas; Colombia	161 kg AM	Zacarías Bonnat; Dominican Republic	160 kg	Juan Solís; Colombia	155 kg
Clean & Jerk	Brayan Rodallegas; Colombia	202 kg AM	Juan Solís; Colombia	196 kg	Zacarías Bonnat; Dominican Republic	191 kg
Total	Brayan Rodallegas; Colombia	363 kg AM	Zacarías Bonnat; Dominican Republic	351 kg	Juan Solís; Colombia	351 kg
89 kg
Snatch	Arley Méndez; Chile	170 kg AM	Jordan Cantrell; United States	153 kg	Yony Andica; Colombia	153 kg
Clean & Jerk	Arley Méndez; Chile	205 kg	Jordan Cantrell; United States	190 kg	Yony Andica; Colombia	185 kg
Total	Arley Méndez; Chile	375 kg AM	Jordan Cantrell; United States	343 kg	Yony Andica; Colombia	338 kg
96 kg
Snatch	Jhonatan Rivas; Colombia	180 kg AM	Serafim Veli; Brazil	171 kg	Boady Santavy; Canada	169 kg
Clean & Jerk	Jhonatan Rivas; Colombia	211 kg	Ángel Luna; Venezuela	210 kg	Boady Santavy; Canada	201 kg
Total	Jhonatan Rivas; Colombia	391 kg AM	Ángel Luna; Venezuela	372 kg	Boady Santavy; Canada	370 kg
102 kg
Snatch	D'Angelo Osorio; United States	159 kg	Paul Ferrin; Ecuador	155 kg	Hernán Viera; Peru	150 kg
Clean & Jerk	D'Angelo Osorio; United States	205 kg	Paul Ferrin; Ecuador	196 kg	Hernán Viera; Peru	195 kg
Total	D'Angelo Osorio; United States	364 kg	Paul Ferrin; Ecuador	351 kg	Hernán Viera; Peru	345 kg
109 kg
Snatch	Jesús González; Venezuela	177 kg	Wesley Kitts; United States	176 kg	Juan Columbié; Cuba	174 kg
Clean & Jerk	Wesley Kitts; United States	223 kg	Juan Columbié; Cuba	206 kg	Jesús González; Venezuela	205 kg
Total	Wesley Kitts; United States	399 kg AM	Jesús González; Venezuela	382 kg	Juan Columbié; Cuba	380 kg
+109 kg
Snatch	Luis Lauret; Cuba	183 kg	Caine Wilkes; United States	182 kg	Keiser Witte; United States	175 kg
Clean & Jerk	Caine Wilkes; United States	219 kg	Luis Lauret; Cuba	217 kg	Keiser Witte; United States	212 kg
Total	Caine Wilkes; United States	401 kg	Luis Lauret; Cuba	400 kg	Keiser Witte; United States	387 kg

=== Women ===
Event	Gold		Silver		Bronze	
45 kg
Snatch	Manuela Berrío; Colombia	72 kg	Fiorella Cueva; Peru	69 kg	María Benavides; Ecuador	68 kg
Clean & Jerk	Manuela Berrío; Colombia	95 kg AM	Fiorella Cueva; Peru	90 kg	María Navarro; Nicaragua	75 kg
Total	Manuela Berrío; Colombia	167 kg	Fiorella Cueva; Peru	159 kg	María Benavides; Ecuador	143 kg
49 kg
Snatch	Alyssa Ritchey; United States	83 kg	Beatriz Pirón; Dominican Republic	82 kg	Ana Segura; Colombia	81 kg
Clean & Jerk	Alyssa Ritchey; United States	107 kg AM	Morghan King; United States	102 kg	Beatriz Pirón; Dominican Republic	102 kg
Total	Alyssa Ritchey; United States	190 kg AM	Beatriz Pirón; Dominican Republic	184 kg	Morghan King; United States	180 kg
55 kg
Snatch	Ana López; Mexico	92 kg	Yenny Sinisterra; Colombia	91 kg	Jourdan Delacruz; United States	91 kg
Clean & Jerk	Jourdan Delacruz; United States	116 kg	Alexandra Escobar; Ecuador	113 kg	Yenny Sinisterra; Colombia	110 kg
Total	Jourdan Delacruz; United States	207 kg	Alexandra Escobar; Ecuador	203 kg	Ana López; Mexico	202 kg
59 kg
Snatch	María Lobón; Colombia	95 kg AM	Rosivé Silgado; Colombia	95 kg	Jessica Lucero; United States	94 kg
Clean & Jerk	Rosivé Silgado; Colombia	125 kg AM	María Lobón; Colombia	120 kg	Jessica Lucero; United States	113 kg
Total	Rosivé Silgado; Colombia	220 kg AM	María Lobón; Colombia	215 kg	Jessica Lucero; United States	207 kg
64 kg
Snatch	Natalia Llamosa; Colombia	102 kg	Mercedes Pérez; Colombia	101 kg	Maude Charron; Canada	101 kg
Clean & Jerk	Mattie Sasser; United States	129 kg AM	Mercedes Pérez; Colombia	128 kg	Maude Charron; Canada	125 kg
Total	Mercedes Pérez; Colombia	229 kg	Natalia Llamosa; Colombia	227 kg	Mattie Sasser; United States	227 kg
71 kg
Snatch	Katherine Nye; United States	110 kg AM	Mattie Rogers; United States	106 kg	Hellen Escobar; Colombia	98 kg
Clean & Jerk	Katherine Nye; United States	135 kg	Mattie Rogers; United States	132 kg	Jennifer Cantú; Mexico	122 kg
Total	Katherine Nye; United States	245 kg AM	Mattie Rogers; United States	238 kg	Hellen Escobar; Colombia	219 kg
76 kg
Snatch	Neisi Dájomes; Ecuador	109 kg	Jenny Arthur; United States	108 kg	Melisa Aguilera; Cuba	100 kg
Clean & Jerk	Neisi Dájomes; Ecuador	136 kg	Jenny Arthur; United States	135 kg	Kristel Ngarlem; Canada	133 kg
Total	Neisi Dájomes; Ecuador	245 kg	Jenny Arthur; United States	243 kg	Kristel Ngarlem; Canada	228 kg
81 kg
Snatch	Dayana Mina; Ecuador	103 kg	Anacarmen Torres; Mexico	102 kg	Talía Hurtado; Cuba	93 kg
Clean & Jerk	Anacarmen Torres; Mexico	131 kg	Dayana Mina; Ecuador	129 kg	Talía Hurtado; Cuba	121 kg
Total	Anacarmen Torres; Mexico	233 kg	Dayana Mina; Ecuador	232 kg	Talía Hurtado; Cuba	214 kg
87 kg
Snatch	Crismery Santana; Dominican Republic	112 kg	María Valdés; Chile	108 kg	Jaqueline Ferreira; Brazil	106 kg
Clean & Jerk	María Valdés; Chile	141 kg	Crismery Santana; Dominican Republic	141 kg	Tamara Salazar; Ecuador	138 kg
Total	Crismery Santana; Dominican Republic	253 kg	María Valdés; Chile	249 kg	Tamara Salazar; Ecuador	243 kg
+87 kg
Snatch	Sarah Robles; United States	124 kg	Verónica Saladín; Dominican Republic	123 kg	Lisseth Ayoví; Ecuador	118 kg
Clean & Jerk	Sarah Robles; United States	155 kg	Verónica Saladín; Dominican Republic	147 kg	Lisseth Ayoví; Ecuador	146 kg
Total	Sarah Robles; United States	279 kg	Verónica Saladín; Dominican Republic	270 kg	Lisseth Ayoví; Ecuador	264 kg

== Medals tables ==
Ranking by Big (Total result) medals

* Host nation (Guatemala)

Rank	Nation	Gold	Silver	Bronze	Total
1	United States (USA)	8	3	4	15
2	Colombia (COL)	6	4	4	14
3	Mexico (MEX)	3	0	1	4
4	Dominican Republic (DOM)	1	4	0	5
5	Ecuador (ECU)	1	3	4	8
6	Chile (CHI)	1	1	0	2
7	Venezuela (VEN)	0	2	0	2
8	Cuba (CUB)	0	1	2	3
9	Guatemala (GUA)*	0	1	1	2
9	Peru (PER)	0	1	1	2
11	Canada (CAN)	0	0	2	2
Totals (11 entries)		20	20	19	59

Ranking by all medals: Big (Total result) and Small (Snatch and Clean & Jerk)

* Host nation (Guatemala)

Rank	Nation	Gold	Silver	Bronze	Total
1	United States (USA)	22	12	10	44
2	Colombia (COL)	18	12	12	42
3	Mexico (MEX)	7	2	2	11
4	Ecuador (ECU)	5	7	8	20
5	Chile (CHI)	4	2	0	6
6	Dominican Republic (DOM)	2	11	2	15
7	Cuba (CUB)	1	3	8	12
8	Venezuela (VEN)	1	3	1	5
9	Peru (PER)	0	3	4	7
10	Guatemala (GUA)*	0	3	2	5
11	Brazil (BRA)	0	1	1	2
12	Haiti (HAI)	0	1	0	1
13	Canada (CAN)	0	0	7	7
14	Nicaragua (NCA)	0	0	1	1
Totals (14 entries)		60	60	58	178

== Team ranking ==
=== Men ===
Rank	Team	Points
1	United States	726
2	Colombia	661
3	Guatemala	568
4	Mexico	468
5	Canada	468
6	Dominican Republic	391
7	Cuba	341
8	Chile	298
9	Peru	297
10	Ecuador	211

=== Women ===
Rank	Team	Points
1	United States	750
2	Colombia	658
3	Ecuador	550
4	Guatemala	452
5	Cuba	437
6	Canada	410
7	Mexico	402
8	Peru	379
9	Chile	260
10	Nicaragua	257
