= Pan American Weightlifting Championships =

- Status: Active
- Frequency: Annual
- Location: Various
- Inaugurated: (help)
- Organiser: PAWF

The Pan American Weightlifting Championships is the continental weightlifting championship, for nations from the North American, Central American, South American and the Caribbean regions, organised by the Pan American Weightlifting Federation (PAWF).

== Senior editions ==
List of championships: from 1996 to 2000, held in the northern and central (NACA) regions as well as the southern (SA) region.

Year	Edition		Host	Events	Ref
Year	M	W	Host	Events	Ref
1984	1	-	Unknown	30	
1985	2	-	Miami, United States	30	
1986	3	-	Holguin, Cuba	30	
1988	4	-	Unknown	30	
1989	5	-	Unknown	30	
1990	6	-	Unknown	30	
1992	7	-	Pachuca, Mexico	57	
1993	8	-	Unknown	57	
1994	9	-	Unknown	57	
1996	10	1	Shreveport, United States(NACA) / (SA) Unknown	57	
1997	11	2	(NACA) Unknown / (SA) Unknown	57	
1998	12	3	(NACA) Unknown / (SA) Unknown	45	
2000	13	4	Shreveport, United States(NACA) / Santa Fe, Argentina (SA)	45	
2001	14	5	Santo Domingo, Dominican Republic	45	
2002	15	6	Barquisimeto, Venezuela	45	
2004	16	7	Cali, Colombia	45	
2005	17	8	Shreveport, United States	45	
2006	18	9	Guatemala City, Guatemala	45	
2008	19	10	Callao, Peru	45	
2009	20	11	Chicago, United States	45	
2010	21	12	Guatemala City, Guatemala	45	
2012	22	13	Antigua Guatemala, Guatemala	45	
2013	23	14	Margarita Island, Venezuela	45	
2014	24	15	Santo Domingo, Dominican Republic	45	
2016	25	16	Cartagena, Colombia	45	
2017	26	17	Miami, United States	48	
2018	27	18	Santo Domingo, Dominican Republic	48	
2019	28	19	Guatemala City, Guatemala	60	
2020	29	20	Santo Domingo, Dominican Republic	60	
2021	30	21	Guayaquil, Ecuador	60	
2022	31	22	Bogotá, Colombia	60	
2023	32	23	Bariloche, Argentina	60	
2024	33	24	Caracas, Venezuela	60	
2025	34	25	Cali, Colombia	48	
2026	35	26	Panama City, Panama	48	

Note: NACA = North America and Central America / SA = South America

== See also ==
- Weightlifting at the Pan American Games
