= List of Brazilian records in Olympic weightlifting =

The following are the records of Brazil in Olympic weightlifting. Records are maintained in each weight class for the snatch lift, clean and jerk lift, and the total for both lifts by the Confederação Brasileira de Levantamento de Pesos (CBLP).

== Current records ==
Key to tables: Awaiting ratification Not ratified or later rescinded by CBLP

=== Men ===
Event	Record	Athlete	Date	Meet	Place	Ref
60 kg
Snatch	123 kg	Thiago Silva	15 May 2025	Brazilian Championships	Sete Lagoas, Brazil	
Clean & Jerk	158 kg	Thiago Silva	15 May 2025	Brazilian Championships	Sete Lagoas, Brazil	
Total	281 kg	Thiago Silva	15 May 2025	Brazilian Championships	Sete Lagoas, Brazil	
65 kg
Snatch	125 kg	Standard				
Clean & Jerk	151 kg	Standard				
Total	271 kg	Standard				
71 kg
Snatch	129 kg	Lucas Santos	15 May 2025	Brazilian Championships	Sete Lagoas, Brazil	
Clean & Jerk	154 kg	Lucas Santos	15 May 2025	Brazilian Championships	Sete Lagoas, Brazil	
Total	283 kg	Lucas Santos	15 May 2025	Brazilian Championships	Sete Lagoas, Brazil	
79 kg
Snatch	145 kg	Josué Silva	16 May 2025	Brazilian Championships	Sete Lagoas, Brazil	
Clean & Jerk	170 kg	Standard				
Total	310 kg	Standard				
88 kg
Snatch	152 kg	Standard				
Clean & Jerk	183 kg	Standard				
Total	316 kg	Standard				
94 kg
Snatch	168 kg	Standard				
Clean & Jerk	200 kg	Standard				
Total	368 kg	Standard				
110 kg
Snatch	175 kg	Matheus Pessanha	4 May 2025	World Junior Championships	Lima, Peru	
Snatch	180 kg	Matheus Pessanha	30 April 2026	Pan American Championships	Panama City, Panama	
Clean & Jerk	220 kg	Matheus Pessanha	4 May 2025	World Junior Championships	Lima, Peru	
Clean & Jerk	228 kg	Matheus Pessanha	30 April 2026	Pan American Championships	Panama City, Panama	
Total	395 kg	Matheus Pessanha	4 May 2025	World Junior Championships	Lima, Peru	
Total	408 kg	Matheus Pessanha	30 April 2026	Pan American Championships	Panama City, Panama	
+110 kg
Snatch	201 kg	Standard				
Clean & Jerk	240 kg	Standard				
Total	440 kg	Standard				

=== Women ===
Event	Record	Athlete	Date	Meet	Place	Ref
48 kg
Snatch	78 kg	Emily Figueiredo	15 February 2025		Rio de Janeiro, Brazil	
Clean & Jerk	100 kg	Emily Figueiredo	15 May 2025	Brazilian Championships	Sete Lagoas, Brazil	
Total	178 kg	Emily Figueiredo	15 May 2025	Brazilian Championships	Sete Lagoas, Brazil	
53 kg
Snatch	87 kg	Nathasha Figueiredo	14 July 2025	Pan American Championships	Cali, Colombia	
Clean & Jerk	111 kg	Nathasha Figueiredo	14 July 2025	Pan American Championships	Cali, Colombia	
Total	198 kg	Nathasha Figueiredo	14 July 2025	Pan American Championships	Cali, Colombia	
58 kg
Snatch	91 kg	Júlia Rodrigues	16 May 2025	Brazilian Championships	Sete Lagoas, Brazil	
Clean & Jerk	112 kg	Júlia Rodrigues	16 May 2025	Brazilian Championships	Sete Lagoas, Brazil	
Total	203 kg	Júlia Rodrigues	16 May 2025	Brazilian Championships	Sete Lagoas, Brazil	
63 kg
Snatch	95 kg	Standard				
Clean & Jerk	120 kg	Standard				
Total	214 kg	Standard				
69 kg
Snatch	98 kg	Stephany Assis	17 May 2025	Brazilian Championships	Sete Lagoas, Brazil	
Clean & Jerk	121 kg	Lourdes Califrer	17 May 2025	Brazilian Championships	Sete Lagoas, Brazil	
Total	216 kg	Stephany Assis	17 May 2025	Brazilian Championships	Sete Lagoas, Brazil	
77 kg
Snatch	110 kg	Laura Amaro	16 July 2025	Pan American Championships	Cali, Colombia	
Clean & Jerk	139 kg	Laura Amaro	8 October 2025	World Championships	Førde, Norway	
Total	246 kg	Laura Amaro	16 July 2025	Pan American Championships	Cali, Colombia	
86 kg
Snatch	112 kg	Standard				
Clean & Jerk	141 kg	Standard				
Total	253 kg	Standard				
+86 kg
Snatch	115 kg	Taiane Justino	18 May 2025	Brazilian Championships	Sete Lagoas, Brazil	
Clean & Jerk	151 kg	Taiane Justino	18 July 2025	Pan American Championships	Cali, Colombia	
Total	265 kg	Taiane Justino	18 May 2025	Brazilian Championships	Sete Lagoas, Brazil	

== Historical records ==
=== Men (2018–2025) ===
Event	Record	Athlete	Date	Meet	Place	Ref
55 kg
Snatch	121 kg	Thiago Silva	6 December 2024	World Championships	Manama, Bahrain	
Clean & Jerk	148 kg	Thiago Silva	6 December 2024	World Championships	Manama, Bahrain	
Total	269 kg	Thiago Silva	6 December 2024	World Championships	Manama, Bahrain	
61 kg
Snatch	125 kg	Thiago Silva	2 May 2024	Brazilian Championships	São Luís, Brazil	
Clean & Jerk	151 kg	Thiago Silva	24 July 2022	Pan American Championships	Bogotá, Colombia	
Total	271 kg	Thiago Silva	2 October 2022	South American Games	Asunción, Paraguay	
67 kg
Snatch	127 kg	Rafael Silveira	24 August 2018	Brazilian Championships	Porto Alegre, Brazil	
Clean & Jerk	147 kg	Rafael Silveira	24 August 2018	Brazilian Championships	Porto Alegre, Brazil	
Total	274 kg	Rafael Silveira	24 August 2018	Brazilian Championships	Porto Alegre, Brazil	
73 kg
Snatch	141 kg	Josué Silva	26 July 2022	Pan American Championships	Bogotá, Colombia	
Clean & Jerk	170 kg	Josué Silva	4 June 2022	Brazilian Championships	Sete Lagoas, Brazil	
Total	310 kg	Josué Silva	4 June 2022	Brazilian Championships	Sete Lagoas, Brazil	
81 kg
Snatch	151 kg	Josué Silva	9 November 2021	Pan American Championships	Guayaquil, Ecuador	
Clean & Jerk	183 kg	Josué Silva	9 November 2021	Pan American Championships	Guayaquil, Ecuador	
Total	334 kg	Josué Silva	9 November 2021	Pan American Championships	Guayaquil, Ecuador	
89 kg
Snatch	155 kg	Josué Silva	24 November 2023		Viçosa, Brazil	
Clean & Jerk	180 kg	Josué Silva	26 May 2023	Brazilian Championships	Sete Lagoas, Brazil	
Total	330 kg	Josué Silva	26 May 2023	Brazilian Championships	Sete Lagoas, Brazil	
96 kg
Snatch	171 kg	Serafim Veli	26 April 2019	Pan American Championships	Guatemala City, Guatemala	
Clean & Jerk	200 kg	Serafim Veli	7 November 2018	World Championships	Ashgabat, Turkmenistan	
Total	370 kg	Serafim Veli	7 November 2018	World Championships	Ashgabat, Turkmenistan	
102 kg
Snatch	170 kg	Marco Machado	4 May 2024	Brazilian Championships	São Luís, Brazil	
Snatch	175 kg	Matheus Pessanha	4 May 2025	Junior World Championships	Lima, Peru	
Clean & Jerk	215 kg	Matheus Pessanha	26 September 2024	World Junior Championships	León, Spain	
Clean & Jerk	220 kg	Matheus Pessanha	4 May 2025	Junior World Championships	Lima, Peru	
Total	383 kg	Matheus Pessanha	26 September 2024	World Junior Championships	León, Spain	
Total	395 kg	Matheus Pessanha	4 May 2025	Junior World Championships	Lima, Peru	
109 kg
Snatch	160 kg	Mateus Machado	9 July 2023	South American Championships	Guayaquil, Ecuador	
Clean & Jerk	195 kg	Mateus Machado	9 July 2023	South American Championships	Guayaquil, Ecuador	
Total	365 kg	Mateus Machado	9 July 2023	South American Championships	Guayaquil, Ecuador	
+109 kg
Snatch	201 kg	Fernando Reis	10 November 2018	World Championships	Ashgabat, Turkmenistan	
Clean & Jerk	235 kg	Fernando Reis	10 November 2018	World Championships	Ashgabat, Turkmenistan	
Total	436 kg	Fernando Reis	10 November 2018	World Championships	Ashgabat, Turkmenistan	

=== Men (1998–2018) ===
Event	Record	Athlete	Date	Meet	Place	Ref
-56 kg
Snatch	102 kg	Luis Eduardo Santana	5 August 2011		Rio de Janeiro, Brazil	
Clean & Jerk	117 kg	Luis Eduardo Santana	5 August 2011		Rio de Janeiro, Brazil	
Total	219 kg	Luis Eduardo Santana	5 August 2011		Rio de Janeiro, Brazil	
-62 kg
Snatch	122 kg	Wellington Mendes	17 April 2004		Viçosa, Brazil	
Clean & Jerk	145 kg	Wellington Mendes	28 February 2004		Viçosa, Brazil	
Total	265 kg	Wellington Mendes	28 February 2004		Viçosa, Brazil	
-69 kg
Snatch	135 kg	Welisson Silva	15 August 2008	Olympic Games	Beijing, China	
Clean & Jerk	165 kg	Welisson Silva	15 July 2007	Pan American Games	Rio de Janeiro, Brazil	
Total	298 kg	Welisson Silva	15 July 2007	Pan American Games	Rio de Janeiro, Brazil	
-77 kg
Snatch	148 kg	Welisson Silva	25 October 2011	Pan American Games	Guadalajara, Mexico	
Clean & Jerk	181 kg	Welisson Silva	25 May 2014	Pan American Championships	Santo Domingo, Dominican Republic	
Total	325 kg	Welisson Silva	25 October 2011	Pan American Games	Guadalajara, Mexico	
-85 kg
Snatch	151 kg	Welisson Silva	24 September 2015	Brazilian Championships	Rio de Janeiro, Brazil	
Clean & Jerk	188 kg	Welisson Silva	6 June 2016	Pan American Championships	Cartagena, Colombia	
Total	331 kg	Welisson Silva	24 September 2015	Brazilian Championships	Rio de Janeiro, Brazil	
-94 kg
Snatch	166 kg	Marco Machado	July 2017	Pan American Championships	Miami, United States	
Clean & Jerk	195 kg	Marco Machado	July 2017	Pan American Championships	Miami, United States	
Total	361 kg	Marco Machado	July 2017	Pan American Championships	Miami, United States	
-105 kg
Snatch	175 kg	Mateus Gregório	7 March 2014	South American Games	Santiago, Chile	
Clean & Jerk	206 kg	Patrick Mendes	15 November 2014	World Championships	Almaty, Kazakhstan	
Total	377 kg	Mateus Gregório	7 March 2014	South American Games	Santiago, Chile	
+105 kg
Snatch	201 kg	Fernando Reis	18 May 2018	Pan American Championships	Santo Domingo, Dominican Republic	
Clean & Jerk	240 kg	Fernando Reis	16 August 2016	Olympic Games	Rio de Janeiro, Brazil	
Total	440 kg	Fernando Reis	5 December 2017	World Championships	Anaheim, United States	

=== Women (2018–2025) ===
Event	Record	Athlete	Date	Meet	Place	Ref
45 kg
Snatch	73 kg	Emily Figueiredo	24 July 2022	Pan American Championships	Bogotá, Colombia	
Clean & Jerk	90 kg	Emily Figueiredo	24 July 2022	Pan American Championships	Bogotá, Colombia	
Total	163 kg	Emily Figueiredo	24 July 2022	Pan American Championships	Bogotá, Colombia	
49 kg
Snatch	85 kg	Luiza Dias	3 June 2022	Brazilian Championships	Sete Lagoas, Brazil	
Clean & Jerk	106 kg	Nathasha Figueiredo	25 July 2022	Pan American Championships	Bogotá, Colombia	
Total	190 kg	Nathasha Figueiredo	25 July 2022	Pan American Championships	Bogotá, Colombia	
55 kg
Snatch	90 kg	Rosane Santos	3 November 2018	World Championships	Ashgabat, Turkmenistan	
Clean & Jerk	106 kg	Rosane Santos	3 November 2018	World Championships	Ashgabat, Turkmenistan	
Total	196 kg	Rosane Santos	3 November 2018	World Championships	Ashgabat, Turkmenistan	
59 kg
Snatch	95 kg	Eduarda Souza	25 May 2023	Brazilian Championships	Sete Lagoas, Brazil	
Clean & Jerk	120 kg	Eduarda Souza	8 September 2023	World Championships	Riyadh, Saudi Arabia	
Total	214 kg	Eduarda Souza	25 May 2023	Brazilian Championships	Sete Lagoas, Brazil	
64 kg
Snatch	91 kg	Nicole Lagos	16 August 2019	Brazilian Championships	Curitiba, Brazil	
Clean & Jerk	114 kg	Lourdes Califrer	18 November 2023	Junior World Championships	Guadalajara, Mexico	
Total	202 kg	Bruna Piloto	23 February 2019		Rio de Janeiro, Brazil	
71 kg
Snatch	108 kg	Amanda Schott	26 May 2023	Brazilian Championships	Sete Lagoas, Brazil	
Clean & Jerk	130 kg	Amanda Schott	13 September 2023	World Championships	Riyadh, Saudi Arabia	
Total	238 kg	Amanda Schott	13 September 2023	World Championships	Riyadh, Saudi Arabia	
76 kg
Snatch	108 kg	Laura Amaro	14 December 2021	World Championships	Tashkent, Uzbekistan	
Clean & Jerk	132 kg	Laura Amaro	14 December 2021	World Championships	Tashkent, Uzbekistan	
Total	240 kg	Laura Amaro	14 December 2021	World Championships	Tashkent, Uzbekistan	
81 kg
Snatch	112 kg	Laura Amaro	27 May 2023	Brazilian Championships	Sete Lagoas, Brazil	
Clean & Jerk	141 kg	Laura Amaro	9 April 2024	World Cup	Phuket, Thailand	
Total	253 kg	Laura Amaro	9 April 2024	World Cup	Phuket, Thailand	
87 kg
Snatch	109 kg	Laura Amaro	5 October 2022	South American Games	Asunción, Paraguay	
Clean & Jerk	138 kg	Laura Amaro	5 October 2022	South American Games	Asunción, Paraguay	
Total	247 kg	Laura Amaro	5 October 2022	South American Games	Asunción, Paraguay	
+87 kg
Snatch	110 kg	Taiane Justino	27 September 2024	World Junior Championships	León, Spain	
Clean & Jerk	145 kg	Taiane Justino	10 April 2024	World Cup	Phuket, Thailand	
Total	253 kg	Taiane Justino	10 April 2024	World Cup	Phuket, Thailand	

=== Women (1998–2018) ===
Event	Record	Athlete	Date	Meet	Place	Ref
48 kg
Snatch	77 kg	Aline Facciolla	9 December 2015	South American Youth Championships	Lima, Peru	
Clean & Jerk	92 kg	Aline Facciolla	9 December 2015	South American Youth Championships	Lima, Peru	
Total	169 kg	Aline Facciolla	9 December 2015	South American Youth Championships	Lima, Peru	
53 kg
Snatch	90 kg	Rosane Santos	7 August 2016	Olympic Games	Rio de Janeiro, Brazil	
Clean & Jerk	106 kg	Rosane dos Reis	July 2017	Pan American Championships	Miami, United States	
Total	194 kg	Rosane dos Reis	July 2017	Pan American Championships	Miami, United States	
58 kg
Snatch	90 kg	Rosane Santos	23 September 2015	Brazilian Championships	Rio de Janeiro, Brazil	
Clean & Jerk	107 kg	Alexanda Aguiar	25 April 2014		Rio de Janeiro, Brazil	
Total	195 kg	Rosane Santos	23 September 2015	Brazilian Championships	Rio de Janeiro, Brazil	
63 kg
Snatch	91 kg	Eliane Nascimento	11 October 2014		Sabará, Brazil	
Clean & Jerk	120 kg	Bruna Piloto	6 June 2016	Pan American Championships	Cartagena, Colombia	
Total	210 kg	Bruna Piloto	6 June 2016	Pan American Championships	Cartagena, Colombia	
69 kg
Snatch	95 kg	Liliane Menezes	6 June 2016	Pan American Championships	Cartagena, Colombia	
Clean & Jerk	123 kg	Liliane Menezes	6 June 2016	Pan American Championships	Cartagena, Colombia	
Total	218 kg	Liliane Menezes	6 June 2016	Pan American Championships	Cartagena, Colombia	
75 kg
Snatch	110 kg	Monique Lima de Araujo	25 September 2015	Brazilian Championships	Rio de Janeiro, Brazil	
Clean & Jerk	135 kg	Jaqueline Ferreira	12 March 2015		Cienfuegos, Cuba	
Total	237 kg	Monique Lima de Araujo	25 September 2015	Brazilian Championships	Rio de Janeiro, Brazil	
+75 kg
Snatch	106 kg	Jaqueline Ferreira	22 May 2015		Rio de Janeiro, Brazil	
Clean & Jerk	131 kg	Mayara Silva Gomes	16 May 2012	Pan American Championships	Antigua, Guatemala	
Total	227 kg	Jaqueline Ferreira	13 July 2012		Rio de Janeiro, Brazil	
