= List of Dominican Republic records in Olympic weightlifting =

The following are the national records in Olympic weightlifting in the Dominican Republic. Records are maintained in each weight class for the snatch lift, clean and jerk lift, and the total for both lifts by the Federación Dominicana de Pesas.

== Current records ==
=== Men ===
Event	Record	Athlete	Date	Meet	Place	Ref
60 kg
Snatch	119 kg	Luís García	5 August 2026	CAC Games	Santo Domingo, Dominican Republic	
Clean & Jerk	153 kg	Luís García	5 August 2026	CAC Games	Santo Domingo, Dominican Republic	
Total	272 kg	Luís García	5 August 2026	CAC Games	Santo Domingo, Dominican Republic	
65 kg
Snatch	kg					
Clean & Jerk	kg					
Total	kg					
71 kg
Snatch	136 kg	Francisco Tonton	6 August 2026	CAC Games	Santo Domingo, Dominican Republic	
Clean & Jerk	166 kg	Francisco Tonton	6 August 2026	CAC Games	Santo Domingo, Dominican Republic	
Total	302 kg	Francisco Tonton	6 August 2026	CAC Games	Santo Domingo, Dominican Republic	
79 kg
Snatch	kg					
Clean & Jerk	kg					
Total	kg					
88 kg
Snatch	kg					
Clean & Jerk	kg					
Total	kg					
94 kg
Snatch	kg					
Clean & Jerk	kg					
Total	kg					
110 kg
Snatch	kg					
Clean & Jerk	kg					
Total	kg					
+110 kg
Snatch	168 kg	Ezequiel Germán	8 August 2026	CAC Games	Santo Domingo, Dominican Republic	
Clean & Jerk	202 kg	Ezequiel Germán	8 August 2026	CAC Games	Santo Domingo, Dominican Republic	
Total	370 kg	Ezequiel Germán	8 August 2026	CAC Games	Santo Domingo, Dominican Republic	

=== Women ===
Event	Record	Athlete	Date	Meet	Place	Ref
48 kg
Snatch	86 kg	Dahiana Ortiz	8 December 2025	Central American & Caribbean Championships	Santo Domingo, Dominican Republic	
Clean & Jerk	107 kg	Dahiana Ortiz	8 December 2025	Central American & Caribbean Championships	Santo Domingo, Dominican Republic	
Total	193 kg	Dahiana Ortiz	8 December 2025	Central American & Caribbean Championships	Santo Domingo, Dominican Republic	
53 kg
Snatch	91 kg	Beatriz Pirón	14 July 2025	Pan American Championships	Cali, Colombia	
Clean & Jerk	110 kg	Beatriz Pirón	14 July 2025	Pan American Championships	Cali, Colombia	
Total	201 kg	Beatriz Pirón	14 July 2025	Pan American Championships	Cali, Colombia	
58 kg
Snatch						
Clean & Jerk						
Total						
63 kg
Snatch	kg					
Clean & Jerk	kg					
Total	kg					
69 kg
Snatch	102 kg	Fransheska Matías	7 October 2025	World Championships	Førde, Norway	
Clean & Jerk	128 kg	Fransheska Matías	7 October 2025	World Championships	Førde, Norway	
Total	230 kg	Fransheska Matías	7 October 2025	World Championships	Førde, Norway	
77 kg
Snatch						
Clean & Jerk						
Total						
86 kg
Snatch	123 kg	Yudelina Mejía	17 July 2025	Pan American Championships	Cali, Colombia	
Clean & Jerk	149 kg	Yudelina Mejía	9 October 2025	World Championships	Førde, Norway	
Total	271 kg	Yudelina Mejía	9 October 2025	World Championships	Førde, Norway	
+86 kg
Snatch						
Clean & Jerk						
Total						

== Historical records ==
=== Men (2018–2025) ===
Event	Record	Athlete	Date	Meet	Place	Ref
55 kg
Snatch	105 kg	Yeison Michel	19 April 2021	Pan American Championships	Santo Domingo, Dominican Republic	
Clean & Jerk	132 kg	Yeison Michel	19 April 2021	Pan American Championships	Santo Domingo, Dominican Republic	
Total	237 kg	Yeison Michel	19 April 2021	Pan American Championships	Santo Domingo, Dominican Republic	
61 kg
Snatch	123 kg	Luis Garcia	April 2019	Pan American Championships	Guatemala City, Guatemala	
Clean & Jerk	160 kg	Luis Garcia	27 July 2019	Pan American Games	Lima, Peru	
Total	281 kg	Luis Garcia	April 2019	Pan American Championships	Guatemala City, Guatemala	
67 kg
Snatch	126 kg	Jean Rosario	April 2019	Pan American Championships	Guatemala City, Guatemala	
Clean & Jerk	152 kg	Jean Rosario	April 2019	Pan American Championships	Guatemala City, Guatemala	
Total	278 kg	Jean Rosario	April 2019	Pan American Championships	Guatemala City, Guatemala	
73 kg
Snatch	144 kg	Julio Cedeño	28 July 2019	Pan American Games	Lima, Peru	
Clean & Jerk	174 kg	Julio Cedeño	28 July 2019	Pan American Games	Lima, Peru	
Total	318 kg	Julio Cedeño	28 July 2019	Pan American Games	Lima, Peru	
81 kg
Snatch	164 kg	Zacarias Bonnat	21 April 2021	Pan American Championships	Santo Domingo, Dominican Republic	
Clean & Jerk	206 kg	Zacarías Bonnat	6 March 2020	"Manuel Suárez In Memoriam" International Tournament	Havana, Cuba	
Total	368 kg	Zacarías Bonnat	6 March 2020	"Manuel Suárez In Memoriam" International Tournament	Havana, Cuba	
89 kg
Snatch	148 kg	Ray Reyes	22 April 2021	Pan American Championships	Santo Domingo, Dominican Republic	
Clean & Jerk	177 kg	Ray Reyes	22 April 2021	Pan American Championships	Santo Domingo, Dominican Republic	
Total	325 kg	Ray Reyes	22 April 2021	Pan American Championships	Santo Domingo, Dominican Republic	
96 kg
Snatch	124 kg	Felix Disla	23 April 2021	Pan American Championships	Santo Domingo, Dominican Republic	
Clean & Jerk	141 kg	Felix Disla	23 April 2021	Pan American Championships	Santo Domingo, Dominican Republic	
Total	265 kg	Felix Disla	23 April 2021	Pan American Championships	Santo Domingo, Dominican Republic	
102 kg
Snatch	135 kg	Confesor Santana	21 April 2023	Central American & Caribbean Championships	Santo Domingo, Dominican Republic	
Clean & Jerk	171 kg	Confesor Santana	21 April 2023	Central American & Caribbean Championships	Santo Domingo, Dominican Republic	
Total	306 kg	Confesor Santana	21 April 2023	Central American & Caribbean Championships	Santo Domingo, Dominican Republic	
109 kg
Snatch	156 kg	José Familia	27 June 2023	CAC Games	San Salvador, El Salvador	
Clean & Jerk	200 kg	José Familia	27 June 2023	CAC Games	San Salvador, El Salvador	
Total	356 kg	José Familia	27 June 2023	CAC Games	San Salvador, El Salvador	
+109 kg
Snatch	167 kg	Luis Coca	27 April 2019	Pan American Championships	Guatemala City, Guatemala	
Clean & Jerk	213 kg	Luis Coca	27 April 2019	Pan American Championships	Guatemala City, Guatemala	
Total	380 kg	Luis Coca	27 April 2019	Pan American Championships	Guatemala City, Guatemala	

=== Women (2018–2025) ===
Event	Record	Athlete	Date	Meet	Place	Ref
45 kg
Snatch						
Clean & Jerk						
Total						
49 kg
Snatch	87 kg	Beatriz Pirón	27 July 2019	Pan American Games	Lima, Peru	
Clean & Jerk	108 kg	Dahiana Ortiz	5 December 2023	IWF Grand Prix II	Doha, Qatar	
Total	193 kg	Beatriz Pirón	27 July 2019	Pan American Games	Lima, Peru	
55 kg
Snatch	90 kg	Nathalia Novas	20 April 2021	Pan American Championships	Santo Domingo, Dominican Republic	
Clean & Jerk	107 kg	Nathalia Novas	20 April 2021	Pan American Championships	Santo Domingo, Dominican Republic	
Total	197 kg	Nathalia Novas	20 April 2021	Pan American Championships	Santo Domingo, Dominican Republic	
59 kg
Snatch	90 kg	Nathalia Novas	10 June 2023	IWF Grand Prix	Havana, Cuba	
Clean & Jerk	109 kg	Nathalia Novas	19 April 2023	Central American & Caribbean Championships	Santo Domingo, Dominican Republic	
Total	198 kg	Nathalia Novas	19 April 2023	Central American & Caribbean Championships	Santo Domingo, Dominican Republic	
64 kg
Snatch	90 kg	Paola Reyes	20 April 2023	Central American & Caribbean Championships	Santo Domingo, Dominican Republic	
Clean & Jerk	113 kg	Paola Reyes	20 April 2023	Central American & Caribbean Championships	Santo Domingo, Dominican Republic	
Total	203 kg	Paola Reyes	20 April 2023	Central American & Caribbean Championships	Santo Domingo, Dominican Republic	
71 kg
Snatch	100 kg	Franshesca Matias	20 April 2023	Central American & Caribbean Championships	Santo Domingo, Dominican Republic	
Clean & Jerk	124 kg	Franshesca Matias	14 June 2023	IWF Grand Prix	Havana, Cuba	
Total	223 kg	Franshesca Matias	20 April 2023	Central American & Caribbean Championships	Santo Domingo, Dominican Republic	
76 kg
Snatch	102 kg	Daiana Serrano	26 June 2023	CAC Games	San Salvador, El Salvador	
Clean & Jerk	125 kg	Daiana Serrano	26 June 2023	CAC Games	San Salvador, El Salvador	
Total	227 kg	Daiana Serrano	26 June 2023	CAC Games	San Salvador, El Salvador	
81 kg
Snatch	112 kg	Yudelina Mejia	14 June 2023	IWF Grand Prix	Havana, Cuba	
Clean & Jerk	140 kg	Yudelina Mejia	23 April 2021	Pan American Championships	Santo Domingo, Dominican Republic	
Total	252 kg	Yudelina Mejia	14 June 2023	IWF Grand Prix	Havana, Cuba	
87 kg
Snatch	117 kg	Crismery Santana	30 July 2019	Pan American Games	Lima, Peru	
Clean & Jerk	142 kg	Crismery Santana	23 April 2021	Pan American Championships	Santo Domingo, Dominican Republic	
Total	258 kg	Crismery Santana	30 July 2019	Pan American Games	Lima, Peru	
+87 kg
Snatch	130 kg	Verónica Saladín	30 July 2019	Pan American Games	Lima, Peru	
Clean & Jerk	153 kg	Verónica Saladín	30 July 2019	Pan American Games	Lima, Peru	
Total	283 kg	Verónica Saladín	30 July 2019	Pan American Games	Lima, Peru	

=== Women (1998–2018) ===
Event	Record	Athlete	Date	Meet	Place	Ref
48 kg
Snatch	86 kg	Beatriz Pirón	19 September 2017	Central American and Caribbean Championships	Guatemala City, Guatemala	
Clean & Jerk	103 kg	Beatriz Pirón	20 August 2017	Universiade	New Taipei City, Taiwan	
Total	188 kg	Beatriz Pirón	20 August 2017	Universiade	New Taipei City, Chinese Taipei	
53 kg
Snatch	97 kg	Yuderqui Contreras	29 May 2014	Pan American Championships	Santo Domingo, Dominican Republic	
Clean & Jerk	117 kg	Yuderqui Contreras	19 July 2010	Central American and Caribbean Games	Mayagüez, Puerto Rico	
Total	213 kg	Yuderqui Contreras	19 July 2010	Central American and Caribbean Games	Mayagüez, Puerto Rico	
58 kg
Snatch						
Clean & Jerk						
Total						
63 kg
Snatch						
Clean & Jerk						
Total						
69 kg
Snatch						
Clean & Jerk						
Total						
75 kg
Snatch						
Clean & Jerk						
Total						
90 kg
Snatch	116 kg	Crismery Santana	18 May 2018	Pan American Championships	Santo Domingo, Dominican Republic	
Clean & Jerk	141 kg	Crismery Santana	4 December 2017	World Championships	Anaheim, United States	
Total	258 kg	Crismery Santana	18 May 2018	Pan American Championships	Santo Domingo, Dominican Republic	
+90 kg
Snatch	120 kg	Verónica Saladín	September 2017	Central American and Caribbean Championships	Guatemala City, Guatemala	
Clean & Jerk	142 kg	Verónica Saladín	September 2017	Central American and Caribbean Championships	Guatemala City, Guatemala	
Total	262 kg	Verónica Saladín	September 2017	Central American and Caribbean Championships	Guatemala City, Guatemala	
