= List of Costa Rican records in Olympic weightlifting =

The following are the records of Costa Rica in Olympic weightlifting. Records are maintained in each weight class for the snatch lift, clean and jerk lift, and the total for both lifts by the Federación Halterofilica Costarricense.

== Men ==
Event	Record	Athlete	Date	Meet	Place	Ref
55 kg
Snatch	67 kg	Jermain Duarte	18 April 2023	Central American & Caribbean Championships	Santo Domingo, Dominican Republic	
Clean & Jerk	92 kg	Jermain Duarte	18 April 2023	Central American & Caribbean Championships	Santo Domingo, Dominican Republic	
Total	159 kg	Jermain Duarte	18 April 2023	Central American & Caribbean Championships	Santo Domingo, Dominican Republic	
61 kg
Snatch						
Clean & Jerk						
Total						
67 kg
Snatch	126 kg	David Jimenez	25 February 2024	Pan American Championships	Caracas, Venezuela	
Clean & Jerk	151 kg	David Jimenez	25 February 2024	Pan American Championships	Caracas, Venezuela	
Total	277 kg	David Jimenez	25 February 2024	Pan American Championships	Caracas, Venezuela	
73 kg
Snatch	111 kg	Andres Peralta	25 February 2024	Pan American Championships	Caracas, Venezuela	
Clean & Jerk	142 kg	Andres Peralta	25 February 2024	Pan American Championships	Caracas, Venezuela	
Total	253 kg	Andres Peralta	25 February 2024	Pan American Championships	Caracas, Venezuela	
81 kg
Snatch	100 kg	Marcelo McFarlane	20 April 2023	Central American & Caribbean Championships	Santo Domingo, Dominican Republic	
Clean & Jerk	60 kg	Marcelo McFarlane	20 April 2023	Central American & Caribbean Championships	Santo Domingo, Dominican Republic	
Total	160 kg	Marcelo McFarlane	20 April 2023	Central American & Caribbean Championships	Santo Domingo, Dominican Republic	
89 kg
Snatch						
Clean and Jerk						
Total						
96 kg
Snatch	120 kg	Mario Araya	29 July 2019	Pan American Games	Lima, Peru	
Clean and Jerk	156 kg	Mario Araya	29 July 2019	Pan American Games	Lima, Peru	
Total	276 kg	Mario Araya	29 July 2019	Pan American Games	Lima, Peru	
102 kg
Snatch	111 kg	Mario Araya	21 April 2023	Central American & Caribbean Championships	Santo Domingo, Dominican Republic	
Clean and Jerk	155 kg	Mario Araya	21 April 2023	Central American & Caribbean Championships	Santo Domingo, Dominican Republic	
Total	266 kg	Mario Araya	21 April 2023	Central American & Caribbean Championships	Santo Domingo, Dominican Republic	
109 kg
Snatch	109 kg	Henry Cerdas	29 July 2019	Pan American Games	Lima, Peru	
Clean and Jerk	153 kg	Henry Cerdas	29 July 2019	Pan American Games	Lima, Peru	
Total	262 kg	Henry Cerdas	29 July 2019	Pan American Games	Lima, Peru	
+109 kg
Snatch	105 kg	Leandro Lopez	22 April 2023	Central American & Caribbean Championships	Santo Domingo, Dominican Republic	
Clean and Jerk	145 kg	Leandro Lopez	22 April 2023	Central American & Caribbean Championships	Santo Domingo, Dominican Republic	
Total	250 kg	Leandro Lopez	22 April 2023	Central American & Caribbean Championships	Santo Domingo, Dominican Republic	

== Women ==
Event	Record	Athlete	Date	Meet	Place	Ref
45 kg
Snatch						
Clean & Jerk						
Total						
49 kg
Snatch	55 kg	Kiana Zuniga	18 April 2023	Central American & Caribbean Championships	Santo Domingo, Dominican Republic	
Clean & Jerk	75 kg	Kiana Zuniga	18 April 2023	Central American & Caribbean Championships	Santo Domingo, Dominican Republic	
Total	130 kg	Kiana Zuniga	18 April 2023	Central American & Caribbean Championships	Santo Domingo, Dominican Republic	
55 kg
Snatch	67 kg	Melison Araya	24 June 2023	CAC Games	San Salvador, El Salvador	
Clean & Jerk	88 kg	Melison Araya	18 April 2023	Central American & Caribbean Championships	Santo Domingo, Dominican Republic	
Total	154 kg	Melison Araya	24 June 2023	CAC Games	San Salvador, El Salvador	
59 kg
Snatch	75 kg	Sofia Ramirez	25 June 2023	CAC Games	San Salvador, El Salvador	
Clean & Jerk	100 kg	Sofia Ramirez	25 June 2023	CAC Games	San Salvador, El Salvador	
Total	175 kg	Sofia Ramirez	25 June 2023	CAC Games	San Salvador, El Salvador	
64 kg
Snatch	75 kg	Dana Ramkellawan	25 June 2023	CAC Games	San Salvador, El Salvador	
Clean & Jerk	95 kg	Sofia Ramirez	26 February 2024	Pan American Championships	Caracas, Venezuela	
Total	170 kg	Sofia Ramirez	26 February 2024	Pan American Championships	Caracas, Venezuela	
71 kg
Snatch	94 kg	Tatiana Salas	20 April 2023	Central American & Caribbean Championships	Santo Domingo, Dominican Republic	
Clean & Jerk	113 kg	Tatiana Salas	20 April 2023	Central American & Caribbean Championships	Santo Domingo, Dominican Republic	
Total	207 kg	Tatiana Salas	20 April 2023	Central American & Caribbean Championships	Santo Domingo, Dominican Republic	
76 kg
Snatch	95 kg	Tatiana Salas	27 February 2024	Pan American Championships	Caracas, Venezuela	
Clean & Jerk	115 kg	Tatiana Salas	27 February 2024	Pan American Championships	Caracas, Venezuela	
Total	210 kg	Tatiana Salas	27 February 2024	Pan American Championships	Caracas, Venezuela	
81 kg
Snatch						
Clean and Jerk						
Total						
87 kg
Snatch						
Clean and Jerk						
Total						
+87 kg
Snatch						
Clean and Jerk						
Total						
