= Juan Columbié =

Cuban weightlifter (born 1995)

Personal information
- Full name: Juan Columbié Sanamé
- Born: 24 January 1995 (age 31)

Sport
- Country: Cuba
- Sport: Weightlifting
- Weight class: 109 kg
Medal record
Men's weightlifting
Representing Cuba
Pan American Championships
Gold medal – first place	2020 Santo Domingo	109 kg
Bronze medal – third place	2017 Miami	105 kg
Bronze medal – third place	2019 Guatemala City	109 kg
Bronze medal – third place	2022 Bogotá	109 kg
Central American and Caribbean Games
Silver medal – second place	2018 Barranquilla	105 kg S
Silver medal – second place	2018 Barranquilla	105 kg CJ

Juan Columbié Sanamé (born 24 January 1995) is a Cuban weightlifter. He is a four-time medalist, including gold, at the Pan American Weightlifting Championships. He is also a two-time silver medalist at the Central American and Caribbean Games.

== Career ==
He won the bronze medal in the men's 105 kg event at the 2017 Pan American Weightlifting Championships held in Miami, United States. He finished in 5th place in his event at the 2018 Pan American Weightlifting Championships held in Santo Domingo, Dominican Republic.

In 2019, he won the bronze medal in the men's 109 kg event at the Pan American Weightlifting Championships held in Guatemala City, Guatemala. In that same year, he competed in the men's 109 kg event at the Pan American Games held in Lima, Peru. He won the gold medal in the men's 109 kg event at the 2020 Pan American Weightlifting Championships held in Santo Domingo, Dominican Republic.

He won the bronze medal in the men's 109 kg event at the 2022 Pan American Weightlifting Championships held in Bogotá, Colombia. He won the gold medal in the Snatch event with a lift of 168 kg.

== Achievements ==
Year	Venue	Weight	Snatch (kg)				Clean & Jerk (kg)				Total	Rank
Year	Venue	Weight	1	2	3	Rank	1	2	3	Rank	Total	Rank
Pan American Games
2019	Lima, Peru	109 kg	170	~~175~~	175	175	205	~~211~~	~~211~~	205	380	4
Pan American Championships
2017	Miami, United States	105 kg	158	163	167	3rd place, bronze medalist(s)	~~200~~	200	206	2nd place, silver medalist(s)	373	3rd place, bronze medalist(s)
2018	Santo Domingo, Dominican Republic	105 kg	~~160~~	160	166	4	196	~~201~~	~~201~~	6	362	5
2019	Guatemala City, Guatemala	109 kg	167	~~173~~	174	3rd place, bronze medalist(s)	~~200~~	200	206	2nd place, silver medalist(s)	380	3rd place, bronze medalist(s)
2020	Santo Domingo, Dominican Republic	109 kg	~~163~~	163	166	2nd place, silver medalist(s)	195	202	209	1st place, gold medalist(s)	375	1st place, gold medalist(s)
2022	Bogotá, Colombia	109 kg	160	165	168	1st place, gold medalist(s)	~~192~~	192	~~200~~	3rd place, bronze medalist(s)	360	3rd place, bronze medalist(s)
Central American and Caribbean Games
2018	Barranquilla, Colombia	105 kg	~~163~~	163	173	2nd place, silver medalist(s)	200	~~208~~	~~211~~	2nd place, silver medalist(s)	—N/a	—N/a
