= Weightlifting at the 2023 Pan American Games – Men's 102 kg =

Weightlifting – Men's 102kg at the 2023 Pan American Games
- Venue: Gimnasio Chimkowe
- Dates: 23 October
- Competitors: 16 from 15 nations

Medalists
Gold medal	Jhonatan Rivas	Colombia
Silver medal	Juan Carlos Zaldívar	Cuba
Bronze medal	Jhohan Sanguino	Venezuela

The men's 102 kg competition of the weightlifting events at the 2023 Pan American Games in Santiago, Chile, was held on 23 October at the Gimnasio Chimkowe.

Each lifter performed in both the snatch and clean and jerk lifts, with the final score being the sum of the lifter's best result in each. The athlete received three attempts in each of the two lifts; the score for the lift was the heaviest weight successfully lifted. This weightlifting event was limited to competitors with a maximum of 102 kilograms of body mass.

== Results ==
The results were as follows:

Rank	Athlete	Nation	Group	Snatch (kg)				Clean & Jerk (kg)				Total
Rank	Athlete	Nation	Group	1	2	3	Result	1	2	3	Result	Total
1st place, gold medalist(s)	Jhonatan Rivas	Colombia	A	172	176	–	176	202	206	–	206	382
2nd place, silver medalist(s)	Juan Carlos Zaldívar	Cuba	A	161	166	~~170~~	166	201	206	209	209	375
3rd place, bronze medalist(s)	Jhohan Sanguino	Venezuela	A	162	166	~~170~~	166	200	205	~~209~~	205	371
4	Yeison López Cuello	Colombia	A	155	160	163	163	202	~~209~~	~~209~~	202	365
5	Antonio Govea	Mexico	A	157	162	165	165	191	~~196~~	196	196	361
6	Morgan McCullough	United States	A	148	153	158	158	190	196	~~201~~	196	354
7	Marco Machado	Brazil	A	~~162~~	~~162~~	163	163	~~190~~	190	~~200~~	190	353
8	Amel Atencia	Peru	A	~~150~~	150	155	155	190	~~195~~	196	196	351
9	Luis Lamenza	Puerto Rico	A	155	160	~~165~~	160	180	~~190~~	~~190~~	180	340
10	Noah Santavy	Canada	A	150	~~155~~	~~155~~	150	185	~~190~~	~~190~~	185	335
11	Nicolás Cuevas	Chile	A	143	146	~~150~~	146	~~177~~	~~177~~	177	177	323
12	Juan José Prieto	Paraguay	A	140	145	~~150~~	145	~~170~~	170	~~180~~	170	315
13	Confesor Santana	Dominican Republic	A	130	~~137~~	140	140	165	175	~~181~~	175	315
14	Diego Picún	Uruguay	A	127	132	~~137~~	132	150	157	166	166	298
15	Wilmer Contreras	Ecuador	A	130	135	–	135	150	–	–	150	285
16	Quontana Clarke	Barbados	A	95	~~100~~	~~100~~	95	125	132	137	137	232
