= Weightlifting at the 2020 Summer Olympics – Men's +109 kg =

Men's +109 kg at the Games of the XXXII Olympiad
- Venue: Tokyo International Forum
- Date: 4 August 2021
- Competitors: 13 from 13 nations
- Winning total: 488 kg WR

Medalists
1st place, gold medalist(s)		Lasha Talakhadze	Georgia
2nd place, silver medalist(s)		Ali Davoudi	Iran
3rd place, bronze medalist(s)		Man Asaad	Syria

The Men's +109 kg weightlifting competitions at the 2020 Summer Olympics in Tokyo took place on 4 August at the Tokyo International Forum.

Fernando Reis of Brazil was on the start list, but he was ejected from the Games after being suspended following a positive drug test for human growth hormone. He was replaced by David Litvinov from Israel. Meanwhile, Algeria's Walid Bidani tested positive for COVID-19, forcing him to withdrawn from the event.

The event was won by Georgia's Lasha Talakhadze, who also set a new record and defending his gold medal. Iran and Syria brought home the silver and bronze medals through Ali Davoudi and Man Asaad, respectively. In group B, Hungarian Péter Nagy, Spanish Marcos Ruiz, American Caine Wilkes, Austrian Sargis Martirosjan, Israeli David Litvinov, and Chinese Taipei's Hsieh Yun-ting earn their place in total lifting.

== Background ==
The lifters from Rio 2016 - Talakhadze (gold medallist), Asaad, Bidani, Nagy, Reis, Czech's Jiří Orság and Turkmenistan's Hojamuhammet Toýçyýew - returns to participate in the event. They were split into two groups (A and B). Trained by 2004 Olympics champion in weightlifting, Giorgi Asanidze, Talakhadze aims to defend the gold medal he won at Rio.

In group A, during the snatch, New Zealand's David Liti, Orság and Netherlands' Enzo Kuworge were all well. On the second attempt, Liti and Orság passes while Kuworge fails, thus the Dutch would ending his snatch with just one lifting (175 kg). By the third attempt, the latter two also failed to pass, finishing with 178 kg and 180 kg, respectively. Toýçyýew could pass with just one lifting (184 kg) after the last two attempts were cancelled (first due to elbow movement and second to the Turkmen's inability to lift on the third attempt). Asaad, like the three aforementioned lifters on the earlier part, passed with two lifts and earns total (190 kg). His coaches had once handing challenge card to jury to challenging his no lift decision due to elbow press-out, which ultimately retained, earning him just two lifts. Davoudi and Talakhadze would eventually passing all attempts of snatch, and the trio leads up on the first section. Meanwhile, Bidani was tested positive for COVID-19 and withdraws from the event. Reis was named for the first attempt, but his participation was immediately removed after tested positive for human growth hormone, which was prohibited in any sports tournament, including the Olympics. He was later replaced with Litvinov and participated in group B. In that group, during the snatch, Nagy passes all attempts, leads up the group. He was followed by other lifters.

In the clean and jerk, Kuworge finishes the first and last attempts (225 kg and 234 kg), missed out on second attempt, earning him the total (409 kg). Liti and Toýçyýew's lifting totals were tied together (414 kg; missed one lift for the Kiwi (241 kg) and two for the Turkmen (235 and 241 kg)). The rest followed the suit, with only Talakhadze and Nagy cleans in all three attempts, with the Georgian later claims the gold, totalling 488 kg, thus breaking the world record for heaviest lifting ever by a human. The worst being Orság, failing all three attempts in clean and jerk, thus the Czech was eliminated from the event. On the other hand, Davoudi's 441 kg and Asaad's 424 kg totals earns them silver and bronze, only misses out their second and final attempts (240 kg for the Iranian and 242 kg for the Syrian).

During the Victory Ceremony, Talakhadze, Davoudi and Asaad were awarded medal by Ryu Seung-min, IOC member, South Korean table tennis player and champion of the event in 2004, and Mohammed Hasan Jalood, IWF secretary general, Iraq.

== Records ==
Prior to this competition, the existing world and Olympic records were as follows.

World Record	Snatch	Lasha Talakhadze (GEO)	222 kg	Moscow, Russia	11 April 2021
World Record	Clean & Jerk	Lasha Talakhadze (GEO)	264 kg	Pattaya, Thailand	27 September 2019
World Record	Total	Lasha Talakhadze (GEO)	485 kg	Moscow, Russia	11 April 2021
Olympic Record	Snatch	Olympic Standard	204 kg	—	1 November 2018
Olympic Record	Clean & Jerk	Olympic Standard	250 kg	—	1 November 2018
Olympic Record	Total	Olympic Standard	449 kg	—	1 November 2018

== Results ==
Rank	Athlete	Nation	Group	Body weight	Snatch (kg)				Clean & Jerk (kg)				Total
Rank	Athlete	Nation	Group	Body weight	1	2	3	Result	1	2	3	Result	Total
1st place, gold medalist(s)	Lasha Talakhadze	Georgia	A	177.00	208	215	223	223 WR	245	255	265	265 WR	488 WR
2nd place, silver medalist(s)	Ali Davoudi	Iran	A	168.25	191	196	200	200	234	~~240~~	241	241	441
3rd place, bronze medalist(s)	Man Asaad	Syria	A	147.55	185	190	~~197~~	190	228	234	~~242~~	234	424
4	Hojamuhammet Toýçyýew	Turkmenistan	A	141.85	184	~~188~~	~~190~~	184	230	~~235~~	~~241~~	230	414
5	David Liti	New Zealand	A	176.55	173	178	~~183~~	178	229	236	~~241~~	236	414
6	Enzo Kuworge	Netherlands	A	161.10	175	~~180~~	~~180~~	175	225	~~233~~	234	234	409
7	Péter Nagy	Hungary	B	160.30	165	173	178	178	206	214	218	218	396
8	Marcos Ruiz	Spain	B	109.90	175	180	~~185~~	180	210	~~215~~	215	215	395
9	Caine Wilkes	United States	B	151.15	173	~~178~~	~~180~~	173	212	217	~~224~~	217	390
10	Sargis Martirosjan	Austria	B	114.35	~~175~~	~~180~~	180	180	190	201	~~205~~	201	381
11	David Litvinov	Israel	B	128.30	176	~~181~~	~~181~~	176	205	~~210~~	~~210~~	205	381
12	Hsieh Yun-ting	Chinese Taipei	B	126.05	165	172	~~179~~	172	~~206~~	206	~~214~~	206	378
—	Jiří Orság	Czech Republic	A	140.90	175	180	~~184~~	180	~~232~~	~~235~~	~~235~~	—	—
—	Walid Bidani	Algeria	A	Did not start									

== New records ==
Snatch	208 kg	Lasha Talakhadze (GEO)	OR
Snatch	215 kg	Lasha Talakhadze (GEO)	OR
Snatch	223 kg	Lasha Talakhadze (GEO)	WR, OR
Clean & Jerk	255 kg	Lasha Talakhadze (GEO)	OR
Clean & Jerk	265 kg	Lasha Talakhadze (GEO)	WR, OR
Total	468 kg	Lasha Talakhadze (GEO)	OR
Total	478 kg	Lasha Talakhadze (GEO)	OR
Total	488 kg	Lasha Talakhadze (GEO)	WR, OR
