= David Litvinov =

Israeli weightlifter (born 1993)

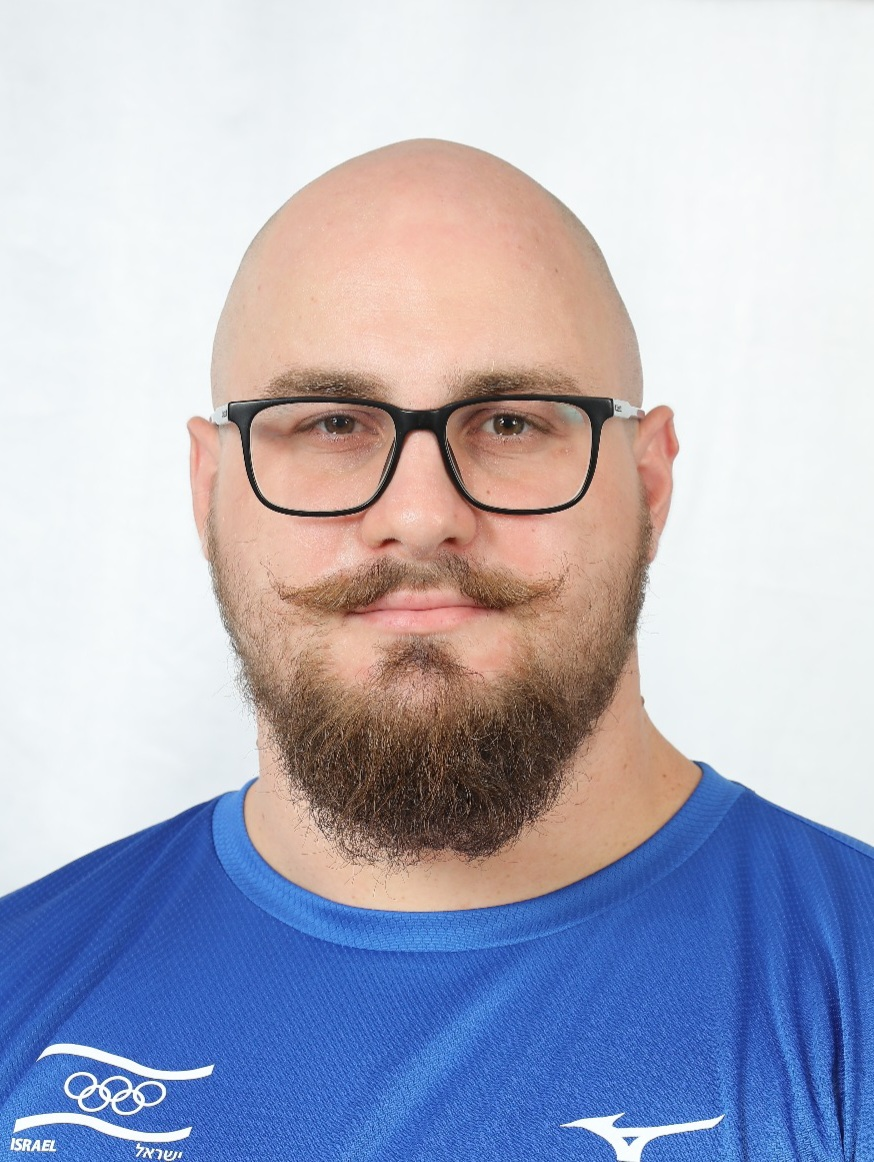

Personal information
- Born: 23 September 1993 (age 32)

Sport
- Country: Israel
- Sport: Weightlifting
- Weight class: +109 kg

Achievements and titles
- Olympic finals: 11th (2021)
- World finals: 17th (2018)
- Regional finals: 7th (2018)
Medal record
Men's weightlifting
Representing Israel
IWF World Cup
Bronze medal – third place	2020 Rome	+109 kg

David Litvinov (Hebrew: דוד ליטבינוב; born 23 September 1993) is an Israeli weightlifter. He represented Israel at the 2020 Summer Olympics in Tokyo, Japan.

== Career ==
Litvinov competed in the men's +105 kg event at the 2017 Summer Universiade held in Taipei, Taiwan and the men's +105 kg event at the 2017 World Weightlifting Championships held in Anaheim, United States. He also competed in the men's +109 kg event at the 2018 World Weightlifting Championships held in Ashgabat, Turkmenistan and the men's +109 kg event at the 2019 World Weightlifting Championships held in Pattaya, Thailand.

Litvinov competed at several editions of the European Weightlifting Championships: he competed in the men's +105 kg event at the 2014 European Weightlifting Championships in Israel, Tel Aviv, at the 2016 European Weightlifting Championships in Førde, Norway, at the 2017 European Weightlifting Championships in Split, Croatia and the 2018 European Weightlifting Championships in Bucharest, Romania. He also competed in the men's +109 kg event at the 2021 European Weightlifting Championships in Moscow, Russia.

In 2020, Litvinov won the bronze medal in the men's +109 kg event at the Roma 2020 World Cup in Rome, Italy.

Fernando Reis of Brazil had qualified to compete in the men's +109 kg event at the 2020 Summer Olympics in Tokyo, Japan but he was suspended after testing positive for human growth hormone. He was replaced by Litvinov less than a week before the opening ceremony of the 2020 Summer Olympics. Litvinov finished in 11th place with a total of 381 kg.

In 2023, he competed at the European Weightlifting Championships held in Yerevan, Armenia.

== Achievements ==
Year	Venue	Weight	Snatch (kg)				Clean & Jerk (kg)				Total	Rank
Year	Venue	Weight	1	2	3	Rank	1	2	3	Rank	Total	Rank
Summer Olympics
2021	Tokyo, Japan	+109 kg	176	~~181~~	~~181~~	10	205	~~210~~	~~210~~	11	381	11
World Championships
2017	Anaheim, United States	+105 kg	160	166	~~172~~	15	~~190~~	190	~~203~~	18	356	18
2018	Ashgabat, Turkmenistan	+109 kg	170	175	~~178~~	17	200	205	~~210~~	20	380	17
2019	Pattaya, Thailand	+109 kg	176	181	184	12	~~205~~	205	211	21	395	19
