= Weightlifting at the 2019 Pan American Games – Men's +109 kg =

Weightlifting – Men's +109kg at the 2019 Pan American Games
- Venue: Coliseo Mariscal Caceres
- Dates: July 30
- Competitors: 5 from 5 nations

Medalists
Gold medal	Fernando Reis	Brazil
Silver medal	Luis Lauret	Cuba
Bronze medal	Raúl Manríquez	Mexico

The men's +109 kg competition of the weightlifting events at the 2019 Pan American Games in Lima, Peru, was held on July 30 at the Coliseo Mariscal Caceres.

== Results ==
5 athletes from five countries took part.

Rank	Athlete	Nation	Group	Snatch (kg)				Clean & Jerk (kg)				Total
Rank	Athlete	Nation	Group	1	2	3	Result	1	2	3	Result	Total
1st place, gold medalist(s)	Fernando Reis	Brazil	A	180	185	190	190	212	220	230	230	420
2nd place, silver medalist(s)	Luis Lauret	Cuba	A	176	181	~~190~~	181	211	218	~~230~~	218	399
3rd place, bronze medalist(s)	Raúl Manríquez	Mexico	A	170	175	~~177~~	175	210	218	~~225~~	218	393
4	Fernando Salas	Ecuador	A	171	176	178	178	206	~~212~~	~~212~~	206	384
5	Gilberto Lemus	Guatemala	A	160	170	~~175~~	170	190	~~200~~	205	205	375
