= Weightlifting at the 2018 Central American and Caribbean Games =

- Venue: Coliseo Universidad del Atlántico
- Location: (Colombia) Barranquilla
- Dates: 20–24 July
- Competitors: 111 from 14 nations

The weightlifting competition at the 2018 Central American and Caribbean Games was held in Barranquilla, Colombia from 20 to 24 July at the Coliseo Universidad del Atlántico.

== Participating nations ==
A total of 111 athletes from 14 nations competed in weightlifting at the 2018 Central American and Caribbean Games:

- Aruba (1)
- Colombia (14)
- Costa Rica (5)
- Cuba (12)
- Dominican Republic (14)
- El Salvador (8)
- Guatemala (9)
- Haiti (1)
- Honduras (5)
- Mexico (14)
- Nicaragua (6)
- Panama (2)
- Puerto Rico (8)
- Venezuela (12)

== Medal summary ==
=== Men's events ===
Event		Gold		Silver		Bronze	
56 kg	Snatch	Luis García (DOM)	123 kg GR	Carlos Berna (COL)	122 kg	Otto Oñate (CUB)	108 kg
56 kg	Clean & Jerk	Carlos Berna (COL)	154 kg GR	Luis García (DOM)	153 kg	Otto Oñate (CUB)	145 kg
62 kg	Snatch	Francisco Mosquera (COL)	132 kg	Jhon Serna (COL)	123 kg	Jhon Piron (DOM)	122 kg
62 kg	Clean & Jerk	Antonio Vázquez (MEX)	171 kg	Francisco Mosquera (COL)	170 kg	Jhon Serna (COL)	163 kg
69 kg	Snatch	Julio Mayora (VEN)	151 kg GR	Julio Cesar Cedeño (DOM)	136 kg	Jonathan Muñoz (MEX)	135 kg
69 kg	Clean & Jerk	Julio Mayora (VEN)	176 kg GR	Jonathan Muñoz (MEX)	169 kg	Julio Cesar Cedeño (DOM)	168 kg
77 kg	Snatch	Hugo Montes (COL)	160 kg	Addriel La O (CUB)	159 kg	Oscar Valdizon (GUA)	132 kg
77 kg	Clean & Jerk	Addriel La O (CUB)	187 kg	Hugo Montes (COL)	183 kg	Oscar Valdizon (GUA)	162 kg
85 kg	Snatch	Zacarías Bonnat (DOM)	162 kg	Olfides Sáez (CUB)	161 kg	Ángel Luna (VEN)	160 kg
85 kg	Clean & Jerk	Ángel Luna (VEN)	204 kg	Olfides Sáez (CUB)	203 kg	Zacarías Bonnat (DOM)	193 kg
94 kg	Snatch	Jhonatan Rivas (COL)	165 kg	Victor Quiñones (CUB)	162 kg	Jeyson Arias (VEN)	158 kg
94 kg	Clean & Jerk	Jhonatan Rivas (COL)	204 kg	Victor Quiñones (CUB)	203 kg	Yorbanis Martínez (CUB)	201 kg
105 kg	Snatch	Jesús González (VEN)	174 kg	Juan Columbié (CUB)	173 kg	Gilberto Lemus (GUA)	159 kg
105 kg	Clean & Jerk	Jesús González (VEN)	210 kg	Juan Columbié (CUB)	200 kg	Juan Luis Campos (DOM)	185 kg
+105 kg	Snatch	Santiago Cossio (COL)	180 kg GR	Luis Lauret (CUB)	179 kg	Josue Medina (MEX)	160 kg
+105 kg	Clean & Jerk	Luis Lauret (CUB)	221 kg GR	Santiago Cossio (COL)	206 kg	Luis Alberto Coca (DOM)	204 kg

=== Women's events ===
Event		Gold		Silver		Bronze	
48 kg	Snatch	Ana Segura (COL)	81 kg GR	Georgina Silvestre (DOM)	80 kg	Santa Cotes (DOM)	80 kg
48 kg	Clean & Jerk	Ana Segura (COL)	97 kg	Ludia Montero (CUB)	94 kg	Andrea de la Herrán (MEX)	93 kg
53 kg	Snatch	Génesis Rodríguez (VEN)	90 kg	Carolanni Reyes (DOM)	76 kg	Genesis Murcia (ESA)	75 kg
53 kg	Clean & Jerk	Génesis Rodríguez (VEN)	110 kg	Beatriz Pirón (DOM)	100 kg	Carolanni Reyes (DOM)	91 kg
58 kg	Snatch	Karool Blanco (COL)	93 kg	Monica Domínguez (MEX)	92 kg	Quisia Guicho (MEX)	91 kg
58 kg	Clean & Jerk	Quisia Guicho (MEX)	124 kg GR	Karool Blanco (COL)	118 kg	Monica Domínguez (MEX)	115 kg
63 kg	Snatch	Natalia Llamosa (COL)	102 kg GR	Marina Rodríguez (CUB)	98 kg	Jakelina Heredia (COL)	94 kg
63 kg	Clean & Jerk	Marina Rodríguez (CUB)	125 kg	Jakelina Heredia (COL)	124 kg	Yusleidy Figueroa (VEN)	123 kg
69 kg	Snatch	Mari Sánchez (COL)	108 kg GR	Mercedes Pérez (COL)	107 kg	Yineisy Reyes (DOM)	98 kg
69 kg	Clean & Jerk	Mercedes Pérez (COL)	130 kg	Ana Torres (MEX)	129 kg	Mari Sánchez (COL)	128 kg
75 kg	Snatch	Aremi Fuentes (MEX)	114 kg GR	Leydi Solís (COL)	112 kg	Dayana Chirinos (VEN)	105 kg
75 kg	Clean & Jerk	Leydi Solís (COL)	145 kg GR	Aremi Fuentes (MEX)	135 kg	Melisa Aguilera (CUB)	127 kg
90 kg	Snatch	Crismery Santana (DOM)	114 kg GR	Naryury Pérez (VEN)	113 kg	Mirufay Morillo (VEN)	100 kg
90 kg	Clean & Jerk	Crismery Santana (DOM)	141 kg	Naryury Pérez (VEN)	140 kg	Keyshla Rodríguez (PUR)	121 kg
+90 kg	Snatch	Verónica Saladín (DOM)	122 kg GR	Tania Mascorro (MEX)	120 kg	Yaniuska Espinosa (VEN)	105 kg
+90 kg	Clean & Jerk	Tania Mascorro (MEX)	152 kg GR	Verónica Saladín (DOM)	143 kg	Yaniuska Espinosa (VEN)	130 kg

== Medal table ==
* Host nation (Colombia)

Rank	Nation	Gold	Silver	Bronze	Total
1	Colombia (COL)*	13	9	3	25
2	Venezuela (VEN)	7	2	7	16
3	Dominican Republic (DOM)	5	6	8	19
4	Mexico (MEX)	4	5	5	14
5	Cuba (CUB)	3	10	4	17
6	Guatemala (GUA)	0	0	3	3
7	El Salvador (ESA)	0	0	1	1
7	Puerto Rico (PUR)	0	0	1	1
Totals (8 entries)		32	32	32	96
