= Bonnat =

Bonnat may refer to:

- Bonnat, Creuse, a commune in France
- Canton of Bonnat, Creuse, France
- Bonnat Chocolates, a French chocolate manufacturer
- Félix Bonnat (1921–2013), French Olympic bobsledder
- Léon Bonnat (1833–1922), a French painter
  - Musée Bonnat, in Bayonne, Nouvelle-Aquitaine, France
- Zacarias Bonnat, Dominican Republican weightlifter; see List of Dominican Republic records in Olympic weightlifting
