= Fernando Salas =

Fernando Salas may refer to:

- Fernando Salas (baseball) (born 1985), Mexican professional baseball pitcher
- Fernando Salas (weightlifter) (born 1988), Ecuadorian male weightlifter
