= 2018 World Weightlifting Championships – Men's +109 kg =

The men's +109 kg competition at the 2018 World Weightlifting Championships was held on 10 November 2018.

The International Weightlifting Federation had reorganized the weight categories and discarded all prior world records; only performances meeting defined "world standards" were to count as new records.

== Schedule ==
Date	Time	Event
10 November 2018	08:00	Group C
10 November 2018	12:00	Group B
10 November 2018	17:25	Group A

== Medalists ==
Event	Gold		Silver		Bronze	
Snatch	Lasha Talakhadze (GEO)	217 kg	Gor Minasyan (ARM)	205 kg	Irakli Turmanidze (GEO)	203 kg
Clean & Jerk	Lasha Talakhadze (GEO)	257 kg	Gor Minasyan (ARM)	245 kg	Hojamuhammet Toýçyýew (TKM)	240 kg
Total	Lasha Talakhadze (GEO)	474 kg	Gor Minasyan (ARM)	450 kg	Fernando Reis (BRA)	436 kg

== Records ==
Prior to this competition, the existing world records were as follows.

World Record	Snatch	World Standard	210 kg	—	1 November 2018
World Record	Clean & Jerk	World Standard	250 kg	—	1 November 2018
World Record	Total	World Standard	453 kg	—	1 November 2018

== Results ==
Rank	Athlete	Group	Snatch (kg)				Clean & Jerk (kg)				Total
Rank	Athlete	Group	1	2	3	Rank	1	2	3	Rank	Total
1st place, gold medalist(s)	Lasha Talakhadze (GEO)	A	207	212 WR	217 WR	1st place, gold medalist(s)	245	252 WR	257 WR	1st place, gold medalist(s)	474 WR
2nd place, silver medalist(s)	Gor Minasyan (ARM)	A	200	205	~~211~~	2nd place, silver medalist(s)	240	245	~~250~~	2nd place, silver medalist(s)	450
3rd place, bronze medalist(s)	Fernando Reis (BRA)	A	193	198	201	4	235	~~245~~	~~246~~	4	436
4	Ruslan Albegov (RUS)	A	191	~~197~~	197	7	235	—	—	6	432
5	Mart Seim (EST)	A	185	192	~~195~~	9	235	~~251~~	~~251~~	5	427
6	Hojamuhammet Toýçyýew (TKM)	A	~~187~~	187	~~194~~	11	235	240	~~245~~	3rd place, bronze medalist(s)	427
7	Ali Davoudi (IRI)	A	185	192 JWR	197 JWR	6	227 JWR	~~242~~	~~245~~	9	424 JWR
8	Eduard Ziaziulin (BLR)	A	189 JWR	~~193~~	193 JWR	8	222 JWR	228 JWR	~~232~~	8	421
9	Péter Nagy (HUN)	B	182	~~187~~	187	10	220	226	~~234~~	10	413
10	Kamil Kučera (CZE)	B	178	~~183~~	~~184~~	15	220	225	232	7	410
11	Caine Wilkes (USA)	B	175	180	~~185~~	14	212	220	~~225~~	13	400
12	David Liti (NZL)	B	161	165	169	20	220	226	~~231~~	11	395
13	Aliksei Mzhachyk (BLR)	B	175	~~181~~	~~181~~	16	210	~~215~~	215	15	390
14	Anthony Coullet (FRA)	B	~~160~~	160	165	24	213	217	221	12	386
15	Tamaš Kajdoči (SRB)	B	165	~~170~~	~~170~~	23	~~215~~	215	218	14	383
16	Gurdeep Singh (IND)	C	165	171	~~174~~	18	~~210~~	210	~~220~~	17	381
17	David Litvinov (ISR)	B	170	175	~~178~~	17	200	205	~~210~~	20	380
18	Keiser Witte (USA)	C	160	~~166~~	166	21	200	211	~~220~~	16	377
19	Fernando Salas (ECU)	C	158	165	171	19	198	205	~~212~~	19	376
20	Oleg Slobodianiuk (UKR)	B	161	166	~~171~~	22	210	~~219~~	~~220~~	18	376
21	Hsieh Yun-ting (TPE)	C	150	~~160~~	160	25	180	190	200	21	360
22	Kim Tollefsen (NOR)	C	~~155~~	~~155~~	156	26	190	195	~~200~~	22	351
23	Yerdos Sailau (KAZ)	C	147	152	~~155~~	27	185	190	194	23	346
24	Teemu Roininen (FIN)	C	148	152	~~156~~	28	~~193~~	193	~~197~~	24	345
—	Irakli Turmanidze (GEO)	A	195	200	203	3rd place, bronze medalist(s)	—	—	—	—	—
—	Walid Bidani (ALG)	A	190	197	~~201~~	5	~~220~~	~~220~~	~~220~~	—	—
—	Luis Lauret (CUB)	B	173	180	183	12	~~213~~	~~213~~	~~213~~	—	—
—	Almir Velagić (GER)	B	180	~~185~~	~~185~~	13	—	—	—	—	—
DQ	Rustam Djangabaev (UZB)	A	195	~~199~~	202	—	236	~~244~~	245	—	—

== New records ==
Snatch	212 kg	Lasha Talakhadze (GEO)	WR
Snatch	217 kg	Lasha Talakhadze (GEO)	WR
Clean & Jerk	252 kg	Lasha Talakhadze (GEO)	WR
Clean & Jerk	257 kg	Lasha Talakhadze (GEO)	WR
Total	462 kg	Lasha Talakhadze (GEO)	WR
Total	469 kg	Lasha Talakhadze (GEO)	WR
Total	474 kg	Lasha Talakhadze (GEO)	WR
