= Weightlifting at the 2010 South American Games – Men's +105kg =

The Men's +105 kg event at the 2010 South American Games was held over March 29 at 20:00.

== Medalists ==
Gold	Silver	Bronze
Julio Cesar Garcia; Ecuador	Fernando Reis; Brazil	Luis Carlos Santamaria; Colombia

== Results ==
Rank	Athlete	Bodyweight	Snatch			Clean & Jerk			Total
Rank	Athlete	Bodyweight	1	2	3	1	2	3	Total
1st place, gold medalist(s)	Julio Cesar Garcia (ECU)	129.52	160	167	~~170~~	205	210	~~218~~	377
2nd place, silver medalist(s)	Fernando Reis (BRA)	123.37	~~160~~	~~160~~	160	~~197~~	197	206	366
3rd place, bronze medalist(s)	Luis Carlos Santamaria (COL)	132.02	160	~~165~~	165	195	200	~~205~~	365
4	Lauri Blair (BRA)	126.94	155	160	~~165~~	~~185~~	185	~~190~~	345
5	Edgar Rodrigo Cossio (BOL)	118.93	90	~~95~~	~~95~~	130	~~135~~	135	225
	Cristian Alfredo Carroza (CHI)	137.90	165	~~170~~	~~170~~	~~201~~	~~201~~	–	DNF
