= Weightlifting at the 2015 Pan American Games – Men's +105 kg =

Weightlifting – Men's +105 kg at the 2015 Pan American Games
- Venue: Oshawa Sports Centre
- Dates: July 15
- Competitors: 5 from 5 nations

Medalists
Gold medal	Fernando Reis	Brazil
Silver medal	George Kobaladze	Canada
Bronze medal	Fernando Salas Manguis	Ecuador

The men's +105 kg competition of the weightlifting events at the 2015 Pan American Games in Toronto, Canada, was held on July 15 at the Oshawa Sports Centre. The defending champion was Fernando Reis from Brazil.

== Schedule ==
All times are Eastern Daylight Time (UTC-4).

Date	Time	Round
July 15, 2015	19:00	Final

== Results ==
5 athletes from five countries took part.

Rank	Name	Country	Group	B.weight (kg)	Snatch (kg)	Clean & Jerk (kg)	Total (kg)
1st place, gold medalist(s)	Fernando Reis	Brazil	A	150.78	192 PR	235 PR	427 PR
2nd place, silver medalist(s)	George Kobaladze	Canada	A	138.65	168	208	376
3rd place, bronze medalist(s)	Fernando Salas Manguis	Ecuador	A	157.70	170	200	370
4	Luis Hoil Mas	Guatemala	A	147.76	155	182	337
5	Emanuel Coto Pereira	Uruguay	A	127.10	146	167	313
