= Jonathan Muñoz =

Mexican weightlifter (born 1995)

Personal information
- Full name: Jonathan Antonio Muñoz Martínez
- Born: 10 November 1995 (age 30) Aguascalientes, Mexico

Sport
- Country: Mexico
- Sport: Weightlifting
Medal record
Men's weightlifting
Representing Mexico
Pan American Games
Gold medal – first place	2019 Lima	67 kg
Pan American Championships
Gold medal – first place	2019 Guatemala City	67 kg
Silver medal – second place	2020 Santo Domingo	67 kg
Bronze medal – third place	2017 Miami	69 kg
Bronze medal – third place	2018 Santo Domingo	69 kg
Bronze medal – third place	2022 Bogotá	73 kg
Bronze medal – third place	2025 Cali	71 kg
Central American and Caribbean Games
Silver medal – second place	2018 Barranquilla	69 kg CJ
Bronze medal – third place	2018 Barranquilla	69 kg S

Jonathan Antonio Muñoz Martínez (born 10 November 1995) is a Mexican weightlifter. He won the gold medal in the men's 67 kg event at the 2019 Pan American Games held in Lima, Peru. He is also a five-time medalist, including gold, at the Pan American Weightlifting Championships. He also competed at the 2020 Summer Olympics in Tokyo, Japan.

== Career ==
He finished in 4th place in the men's 69 kg event at the 2015 Pan American Games held in Toronto, Canada. A few months later, he competed in the men's 69 kg event at the 2015 World Weightlifting Championships held in Houston, United States. At the 2017 Summer Universiade in Taipei, Taiwan, he finished in 8th place in the men's 69 kg event.

He won the bronze medal in the men's 69 event at both the 2017 Pan American Weightlifting Championships held in Miami, United States and the 2018 Pan American Weightlifting Championships held in Santo Domingo, Dominican Republic. He won two medals in his events at the 2018 Central American and Caribbean Games held in Barranquilla, Colombia.

At the 2019 Pan American Weightlifting Championships held in Guatemala City, Guatemala, he won the gold medal in the men's 67 kg event. In 2021, he won the silver medal in his event at the 2020 Pan American Weightlifting Championships held in Santo Domingo, Dominican Republic.

He also competed in the men's 67 kg event at both the 2018 World Weightlifting Championships in Ashgabat, Turkmenistan and the 2019 World Weightlifting Championships in Pattaya, Thailand.

He competed in the men's 67 kg event at the 2020 Summer Olympics in Tokyo, Japan. He finished in 10th place.

== Achievements ==
Year	Venue	Weight	Snatch (kg)				Clean & Jerk (kg)				Total	Rank
Year	Venue	Weight	1	2	3	Rank	1	2	3	Rank	Total	Rank
Summer Olympics
2021	Tokyo, Japan	67 kg	135	~~139~~	~~139~~	—N/a	~~163~~	163	~~170~~	—N/a	298	10
Pan American Games
2019	Lima, Peru	67 kg	130	135	138	—N/a	163	168	~~173~~	—N/a	306	1st place, gold medalist(s)
