= Weightlifting at the 2019 Pan American Games – Qualification =

The following is the qualification system and qualified nations for the weightlifting at the 2019 Pan American Games which will be held in Lima, Peru.

== Qualification system ==
A total of 126 weightlifters (63 per gender) will qualify to compete at the games. A nation may enter a maximum of 12 weightlifters (six per gender). The host nation (Peru) automatically qualified the maximum team size. All other nations qualified through their team scores from both the 2017 and 2018 Pan American Championships combined. A further two wild cards were awarded (one per gender).

== Qualification timeline ==
Events	Date	Venue
2017 Pan American Weightlifting Championships	June 23–30, 2017	Miami, United States
2018 Pan American Weightlifting Championships	May 12–19, 2018	Santo Domingo, Dominican Republic

== Qualification summary ==
NOC	Men	Women	Total athletes
Argentina	1	3	4
Aruba		1	1
Brazil	3	2	5
Canada	1	3	4
Chile	3	3	6
Colombia	6	6	12
Costa Rica	2	2	4
Cuba	4	4	8
Dominican Republic	4	4	8
Ecuador	6	6	12
El Salvador	2	1	3
Guatemala	3	3	6
Honduras	1		1
Mexico	4	4	8
Nicaragua		2	2
Panama	2		2
Peru	6	6	12
Puerto Rico	3	2	5
Uruguay	2	1	3
United States	4	6	10
Venezuela	6	4	10
Total: 21 NOCs	63	63	126

== Men ==
The following is the list of nations winning quotas for men's events. The country receiving the wild card will be announced later.

- Host nation: 6 Athletes
- Teams 1st–3rd: 6 Athletes
- Teams 4th–7th: 4 Athletes
- Teams 8th–11th: 3 Athletes
- Teams 12th–15th: 2 Athletes
- Teams 16th–17th: 1 Athlete
- Wild card: 1 athlete

Rank	Quota	NOC	Year		Total
Rank	Quota	NOC	2017	2018	Total
–	6	Peru	Host nation		
1	6	Venezuela	177	178	355
2	6	Ecuador	183	167	350
3	6	Colombia	199	149	348
4	4	United States	187	139	326
5	4	Cuba	155	160	315
6	4	Mexico	138	162	300
7	4	Dominican Republic	118	141	259
8	3	Chile	117	140	257
9	3	Guatemala	118	134	252
10	3	Brazil	156	89	245
11	3	Puerto Rico	120	88	208
12	2	Costa Rica	81	53	134
13	2	Uruguay	60	66	126
14	2	El Salvador	31	86	117
15	2	Panama	78	33	112
16	1	Canada	63	48	111
17	1	Argentina	109	0	109
18		Nicaragua	0	82	82
19		Barbados	23	13	36
20		Paraguay	13	0	13
21		Aruba	12	0	12
22	1	Honduras	0	0	0
	63				

- Barbados was awarded a wild card spot and later declined it. It was reallocated to Honduras.

== Women ==
The following is the list of nations winning quotas for women's events. The country receiving the wild card will be announced later.

- Host nation: 6 Athletes
- Teams 1st–3rd: 6 Athletes
- Teams 4th–7th: 4 Athletes
- Teams 8th–11th: 3 Athletes
- Teams 12th–15th: 2 Athletes
- Teams 16th–17th: 1 Athlete
- Wild card: 1 athlete

Rank	Quota	NOC	Year		Total
Rank	Quota	NOC	2017	2018	Total
–	6	Peru	Host nation		
1	6	Colombia	196	175	371
2	6	Ecuador	179	176	355
3	6	United States	165	180	345
4	4	Dominican Republic	165	178	343
5	4	Mexico	179	164	323
6	4	Venezuela	164	159	275
7	4	Cuba	110	165	259
8	3	Chile	149	108	257
9	3	Argentina	120	110	230
10	3	Guatemala	109	114	223
11	3	Canada	119	94	213
12	2	Nicaragua	103	84	187
13	2	Puerto Rico	84	61	145
14	2	Costa Rica	83	61	144
15	2	Brazil	70	49	119
16	1	Uruguay	13	33	46
17	1	El Salvador	0	46	46
18		Panama	0	33	33
19	1	Aruba	13	0	13
20		Barbados	0	13	13
21		Guyana	7	0	7
	63				

- Aruba was awarded a wild card spot.
