= Wesley Kitts =

American weightlifter (born 1990)

Wes Kitts
Personal information
- Full name: Wesley Brian Kitts
- Born: May 22, 1990 (age 36) Knoxville, Tennessee, U.S.
- Weight: 108.45 kg (239 lb)

Sport
- Country: United States
- Sport: Weightlifting
- Weight class: 109 kg
- Club: BE SOMEBODY Gym
- Coached by: David Spitz

Achievements and titles
- Personal bests: Snatch: 177 kg (2021); Clean & jerk: 223 kg (2019); Total: 399 kg (2019)
Medal record
Men's weightlifting
Representing United States
Pan American Games
Gold medal – first place	2019 Lima	–109 kg
Pan American Championships
Gold medal – first place	2018 Santo Domingo	–105 kg
Gold medal – first place	2019 Guatemala City	–109 kg
Gold medal – first place	2023 Bariloche	–109 kg
Silver medal – second place	2017 Miami	–105 kg

Wesley Brian Kitts (/ˈwɛs/ WESS; born May 22, 1990) is an American weightlifter, two time Pan American Champion and Pan American Games Champion competing in the 105 kg category until 2018 and 109 kg starting in 2018 after the International Weightlifting Federation reorganized the categories.

== Career ==
In 2018 he competed at the 2018 World Weightlifting Championships in the 109 kg division finishing 10th overall.

In 2019 he competed at the 2019 Pan American Weightlifting Championships in the 109 kg division winning a silver medal in the snatch and gold medals in the clean & jerk, his total of 399 kg was 17 kg more than the silver medalist, and a new Pan American record. On July 30 he competed in the 109 kg division at the Pan American Games. After the snatch portion he was in fourth place, a total of 18 kg behind Jorge Arroyo, he was able to complete his third lift of 217 kg in the clean & jerk to win the gold medal by 1 kg.

He represented the United States at the 2020 Summer Olympics in Tokyo, Japan. He finished eighth with a total lift of 390 kg.

He won the gold medal in his event at the 2023 Pan American Weightlifting Championships held in Bariloche, Argentina.

In August 2024, Kitts competed in the men's 102 kg event at the 2024 Summer Olympics held in Paris, France. He lifted 374 kg in total and finished in eighth position.

In October 2025, Kitts signed up to compete in weightlifting at the inaugural Enhanced Games, set to take place in May 2026.

== Major results ==
Year	Venue	Weight	Snatch (kg)				Clean & Jerk (kg)				Total	Rank
Year	Venue	Weight	1	2	3	Rank	1	2	3	Rank	Total	Rank
Olympic Games
2021	Tokyo, Japan	109 kg	173	~~177~~	177	—N/a	~~213~~	213	~~220~~	—N/a	390	8
2024	Paris, France	102 kg	167	172	~~177~~	—N/a	202	~~210~~	~~210~~	—N/a	374	8
World Championships
2017	Anaheim, United States	105 kg	165	~~172~~	176	11	~~202~~	203	210	10	386	10
2018	Ashgabat, Turkmenistan	109 kg	168	~~174~~	~~174~~	18	208	215	222	5	390	12
2019	Pattaya, Thailand	109 kg	170	~~175~~	~~177~~	18	211	218	~~225~~	12	388	14
2022	Bogotá, Colombia	102 kg	~~164~~	165	170	11	202	~~207~~	209	7	379	8
2023	Riyadh, Saudi Arabia	109 kg	160	165	170	9	191	200	—	13	370	11
Pan American Games
2019	Lima, Peru	109 kg	165	~~171~~	172	—N/a	207	214	217	—N/a	389	1st place, gold medalist(s)
Pan American Championships
2016	Cartagena, Colombia	105 kg	~~152~~	152	165	5	188	~~201~~	~~208~~	7	353	4
2017	Miami, United States	105 kg	162	170	175	2nd place, silver medalist(s)	200	~~208~~	~~209~~	5	375	2nd place, silver medalist(s)
2018	Santo Domingo, Dominican Republic	105 kg	165	172	~~181~~	2nd place, silver medalist(s)	202	~~211~~	212	1st place, gold medalist(s)	384	1st place, gold medalist(s)
2019	Guatemala City, Guatemala	109 kg	165	~~172~~	176	2nd place, silver medalist(s)	207	214	223	1st place, gold medalist(s)	399	1st place, gold medalist(s)
2020	Santo Domingo, Dominican Republic	109 kg	155	160	~~165~~	3rd place, bronze medalist(s)	190	—	—	5	350	4
2023	Bariloche, Argentina	109 kg	155	160	165	1st place, gold medalist(s)	190	200	—	2nd place, silver medalist(s)	365	1st place, gold medalist(s)
