= Jhonatan Rivas =

Colombian weightlifter (born 1998)

Personal information
- Nationality: Colombian
- Born: Jhonatan Rivas Mosquera; July 11, 1998 (age 28)
- Weight: 95.00 kg (209 lb)

Sport
- Country: Colombia
- Sport: Weightlifting
- Events: 96 kg; 102 kg
- Coached by: Jaiber Manjarres

Achievements and titles
- Personal bests: Snatch: 180 kg (2019); Clean & Jerk: 213 kg (2020); Total: 393 kg (2020)
Medal record
Representing Colombia
Men's weightlifting
Pan American Games
Gold medal – first place	2019 Lima	96 kg
Gold medal – first place	2023 Santiago	102 kg
Pan American Championships
Gold medal – first place	2019 Guatemala City	96 kg
Gold medal – first place	2020 Santo Domingo	96 kg
Central American and Caribbean Games
Gold medal – first place	2018 Barranquilla	94 kg S
Gold medal – first place	2018 Barranquilla	94 kg CJ
Junior World Championships
Silver medal – second place	2018 Tashkent	94 kg
Youth World Championships
Silver medal – second place	2015 Lima	85 kg

Jhonatan Rivas Mosquera (born 11 July 1998) is a Colombian weightlifter, Pan American Champion and Pan American Games Champion competing in the –94 kg category until 2018 and 96 kg starting in 2018 after the International Weightlifting Federation reorganized the categories.

== Career ==
He won the silver medal at the 2018 Junior World Weightlifting Championships in the 94 kg division, and most recently competed at the 2018 World Weightlifting Championships in the 96 kg division.

He competed at the 2019 Pan American Weightlifting Championships in the 96 kg category, winning gold medals in every lift, outlifting the silver medalist by 19 kg.

He won the gold medal in the men's 102 kg event at the 2023 Pan American Games held in Santiago, Chile.

== Achievements ==
Year	Venue	Weight	Snatch (kg)				Clean & Jerk (kg)				Total	Rank
Year	Venue	Weight	1	2	3	Rank	1	2	3	Rank	Total	Rank
Representing Colombia
World Championships
2018	Ashgabat, Turkmenistan	96 kg	171	176 JWR	~~180~~	4	~~201~~	~~201~~	201	14	377 JWR	10
2019	Pattaya, Thailand	96 kg	175	179	~~182~~	3rd place, bronze medalist(s)	206	~~212~~	212	5	391	4
2023	Riyadh, Saudi Arabia	102 kg	165	~~175~~	175	8	200	~~207~~	207	16	382	10
2024	Manama, Bahrain	102 kg	175	~~180~~	~~181~~	6	208	213	~~218~~	3rd place, bronze medalist(s)	388	5
IWF World Cup
2024	Phuket, Thailand	102 kg	175	~~180~~	~~180~~	11	~~208~~	~~214~~	~~214~~	—N/a	—N/a	—N/a
Pan American Games
2019	Lima, Peru	96 kg	170	175	~~177~~	—N/a	205	210	—	—N/a	385	1st place, gold medalist(s)
2023	Santiago, Chile	102 kg	172	176	–	—N/a	202	206	—	—N/a	382	1st place, gold medalist(s)
Pan American Championships
2017	Miami, United States	85 kg	~~155~~	155	159	2nd place, silver medalist(s)	187	~~192~~	—	7	346	6
2019	Guatemala City, Guatemala	96 kg	172	~~180~~	180	1st place, gold medalist(s)	200	206	211	1st place, gold medalist(s)	391	1st place, gold medalist(s)
2020	Santo Domingo, Dominican Republic	96 kg	175	180	~~182~~	2nd place, silver medalist(s)	~~205~~	208	213	1st place, gold medalist(s)	393	1st place, gold medalist(s)
2024	Caracas, Venezuela	102 kg	~~175~~	—	—	—N/a	—	—	—	—N/a	—N/a	—N/a
Central American and Caribbean Games
2018	Barranquilla, Colombia	94 kg	165	—	—	1st place, gold medalist(s)	200	202	204	1st place, gold medalist(s)	—N/a	—N/a
Junior World Championships
2016	Tbilisi, Georgia	85 kg	~~150~~	150	155	3rd place, bronze medalist(s)	180	~~187~~	~~187~~	10	335	7
2017	Tokyo, Japan	85 kg	155	~~160~~	~~160~~	5	187	191	~~195~~	3rd place, bronze medalist(s)	346	5
2018	Tashkent, Uzbekistan	94 kg	163	168	171	1st place, gold medalist(s)	197	~~202~~	203	2nd place, silver medalist(s)	374	2nd place, silver medalist(s)
Youth World Championships
2015	Lima, Peru	85 kg	135	140	~~143~~	1st place, gold medalist(s)	165	170	175	2nd place, silver medalist(s)	315	2nd place, silver medalist(s)
