= Weightlifting at the 2011 Pan American Games – Men's 77 kg =

Weightlifting – Men's 77 kg at the 2011 Pan American Games
- Venue: Weightlifting Forum
- Dates: October 25
- Competitors: 8 from 8 nations

Medalists
Gold medal	Iván Cambar	Cuba
Silver medal	Ricardo Flores	Ecuador
Bronze medal	Chad Vaughn	United States

The men's 77 kg competition of the weightlifting events at the 2011 Pan American Games in Guadalajara, Mexico, was held on October 25 at the Weightlifting Forum. The defending champion was Iván Cambar from Cuba.

Each lifter performed in both the snatch and clean and jerk lifts, with the final score being the sum of the lifter's best result in each. The athlete received three attempts in each of the two lifts; the score for the lift was the heaviest weight successfully lifted. This weightlifting event was the fourth lightest men's event at the weightlifting competition, limiting competitors to a maximum of 77 kilograms of body mass.

== Schedule ==
All times are Central Standard Time (UTC-6).

Date	Time	Round
October 25, 2011	12:00	Final

== Results ==
8 athletes from 8 countries took part.

Rank	Name	Country	Group	B.weight (kg)	Snatch (kg)	Clean & Jerk (kg)	Total (kg)
1st place, gold medalist(s)	Ivan Cambar	Cuba	A	76.49	150	188	338
2nd place, silver medalist(s)	Ricardo Flores	Ecuador	A	76.08	148	181	329
3rd place, bronze medalist(s)	Chad Vaughn	United States	A	76.96	147	179	326
4	Wellison Silva	Brazil	A	76.40	148	177	325
5	Victor Viquez	Panama	A	76.26	130	168	298
6	Carlos Sauri	Puerto Rico	A	76.58	137	160	297
7	Francis Sidó	Dominican Republic	A	75.73	131	160	291
–	Jose Ocando	Venezuela	A	76.59	140	–	DNF
