= Weightlifting at the 2015 Pan American Games – Men's 94 kg =

Weightlifting – Men's 94 kg at the 2015 Pan American Games
- Venue: Oshawa Sports Centre
- Dates: July 14
- Competitors: 11 from 10 nations

Medalists
Gold medal	Kendrick Farris	United States
Silver medal	Javier Vanega	Cuba
Bronze medal	Herbys Márquez	Venezuela

The men's 94 kg competition of the weightlifting events at the 2015 Pan American Games in Toronto, Canada, was held on July 14 at the Oshawa Sports Centre. The defending champion was Javier Venega from Cuba.

== Schedule ==
All times are Eastern Daylight Time (UTC-4).

Date	Time	Round
July 14, 2015	16:30	Final

== Results ==
11 athletes from ten countries took part.

Rank	Name	Country	Group	B.weight (kg)	Snatch (kg)	Clean & Jerk (kg)	Total (kg)
1st place, gold medalist(s)	Kendrick Farris	United States	A	92.27	163	203	366
2nd place, silver medalist(s)	Javier Vanega	Cuba	A	92.74	166	195	361
3rd place, bronze medalist(s)	Herbys Márquez	Venezuela	A	93.64	155	195	350
4	Freddy Tenorio	Ecuador	A	88.35	155	192	347
5	Marco Gregorio	Brazil	A	91.67	160	187	347
6	Rigoberto Pérez	Mexico	A	93.63	150	185	335
7	Iván Palacios	Argentina	A	92.98	145	180	325
8	Christopher Pavón	Honduras	A	93.76	145	180	325
9	David Samayoa	Canada	A	91.17	145	172	317
10	Christopher Linton	Costa Rica	A	85.74	127	167	294
DSQ	Norik Vardanian	United States	A	93.52	160	202	362
