= Weightlifting at the 2019 Pan American Games – Men's 67 kg =

Weightlifting – Men's 67kg at the 2019 Pan American Games
- Venue: Coliseo Mariscal Caceres
- Dates: July 27
- Competitors: 5 from 5 nations

Medalists
Gold medal	Jonathan Muñoz	Mexico
Silver medal	Edgar Pineda	Guatemala
Bronze medal	Luis Bardalez	Peru

The men's 67 kg competition of the weightlifting events at the 2019 Pan American Games in Lima, Peru, was held on July 27 at the Coliseo Mariscal Caceres.

== Results ==
5 athletes from five countries took part.

Rank	Athlete	Nation	Group	Snatch (kg)				Clean & Jerk (kg)				Total
Rank	Athlete	Nation	Group	1	2	3	Result	1	2	3	Result	Total
1st place, gold medalist(s)	Jonathan Muñoz	Mexico	A	130	135	138	138	163	168	~~173~~	168	306
2nd place, silver medalist(s)	Edgar Pineda	Guatemala	A	~~127~~	127	132	132	~~161~~	161	165	165	297
3rd place, bronze medalist(s)	Luis Bardalez	Peru	A	123	127	~~129~~	127	160	164	~~167~~	164	291
4	Kervis Escalona	Venezuela	A	130	~~133~~	~~133~~	130	160	~~164~~	~~164~~	160	290
	Óscar Figueroa	Colombia	A	~~135~~	135	~~138~~	135	—	—	—	—	DNF
