= Edgar Pineda =

Guatemalan weightlifter (born 1997)

Personal information
- Nationality: Guatemalan
- Born: 17 September 1997 (age 28)
- Height: 1.62 m (5 ft 4 in)
- Weight: 56 kg (123 lb)

Sport
- Country: Guatemala
- Sport: Weightlifting
Medal record
Pan American Games
Silver medal – second place	2019 Lima	–67 kg
Pan American Championships
Bronze medal – third place	2019 Guatemala City	–67 kg
Bronze medal – third place	2020 Santo Domingo	–67 kg

Edgar Pineda Zeta (born 17 August 1997) is a Guatemalan Olympic weightlifter. He represented his country at the 2016 Summer Olympics.
