= Weightlifting at the 2019 Pan American Games – Women's +87 kg =

Weightlifting – Women's +87 kg at the 2019 Pan American Games
- Venue: Coliseo Mariscal Caceres
- Dates: July 30
- Competitors: 5 from 5 nations

Medalists
Gold medal	Sarah Robles	United States
Silver medal	Verónica Saladín	Dominican Republic
Bronze medal	Lisseth Ayoví	Ecuador

The women's +87 kg competition of the weightlifting events at the 2019 Pan American Games in Lima, Peru, was held on July 30 at the Coliseo Mariscal Caceres.

== Results ==
5 athletes from five countries took part.

Rank	Athlete	Nation	Group	Snatch (kg)				Clean & Jerk (kg)				Total
Rank	Athlete	Nation	Group	1	2	3	Result	1	2	3	Result	Total
1st place, gold medalist(s)	Sarah Robles	United States	A	~~120~~	120	125	125	152	159	~~163~~	159	284
2nd place, silver medalist(s)	Verónica Saladín	Dominican Republic	A	120	125	130	130	145	~~152~~	153	153	283
3rd place, bronze medalist(s)	Lisseth Ayoví	Ecuador	A	108	115	~~120~~	115	130	135	140	140	255
4	Caren Torres de Fuentes	El Salvador	A	80	85	90	90	105	110	115	115	205
5	Scarleth Ucelo	Guatemala	A	73	76	~~79~~	76	105	110	~~114~~	110	186

== New records ==
Snatch	130 kg	Verónica Saladín (DOM)	AM, PR
