= Marco Machado =

Brazilian weightlifter (born 1991)

Personal information
- Full name: Marco Túlio Gregório Machado
- Born: 3 November 1991 (age 34)

Sport
- Country: Brazil
- Sport: Weightlifting
- Weight class: 96 kg
Medal record
Men's weightlifting
Representing Brazil
Pan American Championships
Silver medal – second place	2017 Miami	94 kg
Silver medal – second place	2022 Bogotá	96 kg
Silver medal – second place	2023 Bariloche	102 kg
South American Games
Bronze medal – third place	2022 Asunción	96 kg

Marco Túlio Gregório Machado (born 3 November 1991) is a Brazilian weightlifter. He won the bronze medal in the men's 96 kg event at the 2022 South American Games held in Asunción, Paraguay. He is also a three-time silver medalist at the Pan American Weightlifting Championships.

== Career ==
Machado won the silver medal in the men's 94 kg event at the 2017 Pan American Weightlifting Championships held in Miami, United States. He also won the silver medal in the men's 96 kg event at the 2022 Pan American Weightlifting Championships held in Bogotá, Colombia.

Machado also represented Brazil at the Pan American Games in 2015 and 2019. He competed in the men's 94 kg event in 2015 and in the men's 96 kg event in 2019. He finished in 6th place at the 2015 Pan American Games; this became 5th place after the disqualification of Norik Vardanian of the United States.

He won the bronze medal in the men's 96 kg event at the 2022 South American Games held in Asunción, Paraguay. He competed in the men's 96 kg event at the 2022 World Weightlifting Championships in Bogotá, Colombia.

Machado won the silver medal in the men's 102 kg event at the 2023 Pan American Weightlifting Championships held in Bariloche, Argentina. He also won medals in the Snatch and Clean & Jerk events.

== Achievements ==
Year	Venue	Weight	Snatch (kg)				Clean & Jerk (kg)				Total	Rank
Year	Venue	Weight	1	2	3	Rank	1	2	3	Rank	Total	Rank
Pan American Games
2015	Toronto, Canada	94 kg	155	160	~~165~~	—N/a	182	187	~~192~~	—N/a	347	5
2019	Lima, Peru	96 kg	~~165~~	~~165~~	166	—N/a	192	~~197~~	~~198~~	—N/a	358	7
South American Games
2022	Asunción, Paraguay	96 kg	157	162	166	—N/a	185	~~191~~	~~191~~	—N/a	351	3rd place, bronze medalist(s)
