= Verónica Saladín =

Dominican Republic weightlifter (born 1992)

Personal information
- Born: 21 May 1992 (age 34) El Seibo, Dominican Republic

Sport
- Country: Dominican Republic
- Sport: Weightlifting
Medal record
Women's weightlifting
Representing Dominican Republic
Pan American Games
Silver medal – second place	2019 Lima	+87 kg
Pan American Championships
Silver medal – second place	2017 Miami	+90 kg
Silver medal – second place	2018 Santo Domingo	+90 kg
Silver medal – second place	2019 Guatemala City	+87 kg
Central American and Caribbean Games
Gold medal – first place	2018 Barranquilla	+90 kg S
Silver medal – second place	2018 Barranquilla	+90 kg CJ

Verónica Estela Saladín Tolentino (born 21 May 1992) is a weightlifter from the Dominican Republic. She won the silver medal in the women's +87 kg event at the 2019 Pan American Games held in Lima, Peru. She is also a three-time silver medalist at the Pan American Weightlifting Championships and a two-time medalist, including gold, at the Central American and Caribbean Games.

== Career ==
Saladín represented the Dominican Republic at the 2011 Pan American Games held in Guadalajara, Mexico. She finished in 4th place in the women's +75 kg event. She also competed in the women's +75 kg event at the 2011 World Weightlifting Championships held in Paris, France.

Saladín won the bronze medal in the women's +75 kg Snatch event at the 2014 Pan American Weightlifting Championships held in Santo Domingo, Dominican Republic. She competed in the women's +75 kg event at the 2015 Pan American Games held in Toronto, Canada where she did not register a result in the Clean & Jerk. She won the gold medal in the women's +90 kg Snatch event at the 2018 Central American and Caribbean Games held in Barranquilla, Colombia. She also won the silver medal in the women's +90 kg Clean & Jerk event.

In 2018, Saladín competed in the women's +87 kg event at the World Weightlifting Championships in Ashgabat, Turkmenistan. A year later, she competed in the same event at the 2019 World Weightlifting Championships held in Pattaya, Thailand.

In 2019, Saladín won the silver medal in her event at the Pan American Weightlifting Championships held in Guatemala City, Guatemala. She previously also won the silver medal in her event at the Pan American Weightlifting Championships in 2017 and 2018. She won the silver medal in the women's +87 kg event at the 2019 Pan American Games held in Lima, Peru.

Saladín represented the Dominican Republic at the 2020 Summer Olympics in Tokyo, Japan. She finished in 7th place in the women's +87 kg event.

Saladín won the bronze medal in the women's +87 kg Snatch event at the 2022 Pan American Weightlifting Championships held in Bogotá, Colombia.

== Achievements ==
Year	Venue	Weight	Snatch (kg)				Clean & Jerk (kg)				Total	Rank
Year	Venue	Weight	1	2	3	Rank	1	2	3	Rank	Total	Rank
Summer Olympics
2021	Tokyo, Japan	+87 kg	105	111	~~116~~	—N/a	125	131	–	—N/a	242	7
World Championships
2011	Paris, France	+75 kg	97	~~102~~	103	14	118	125	~~127~~	21	228	20
2018	Ashgabat, Turkmenistan	+87 kg	118	122	~~126~~	5	142	~~146~~	~~146~~	12	264	10
2019	Pattaya, Thailand	+87 kg	120	~~125~~	~~126~~	9	140	~~145~~	145	12	265	10
Pan American Games
2011	Guadalajara, Mexico	+75 kg	~~102~~	102	107	—N/a	125	~~127~~	~~127~~	—N/a	232	4
2015	Toronto, Canada	+75 kg	110	115	~~117~~	—N/a	~~132~~	~~132~~	~~132~~	—N/a	—	—N/a
2019	Lima, Peru	+87 kg	120	125	130	—N/a	145	~~152~~	153	—N/a	283	2nd place, silver medalist(s)
Central American and Caribbean Games
2018	Barranquilla, Colombia	+90 kg	~~119~~	119	122	1st place, gold medalist(s)	143	~~147~~	~~148~~	2nd place, silver medalist(s)	—N/a	—N/a
