= Luis Lauret =

Cuban-born Romanian weightlifter

Personal information
- Full name: Luis Manuel Lauret Rodríguez
- Nationality: Romania
- Born: 20 January 1997 (age 29) Cuba
- Weight: 110 kg (240 lb)

Sport
- Sport: Weightlifting
- Event: 110 kg
Medal record
Men's weightlifting
Representing Cuba
Pan American Games
Silver medal – second place	2019 Lima	+109 kg
Pan American Championships
Silver medal – second place	2019 Guatemala City	+109 kg
Bronze medal – third place	2018 Santo Domingo	+105 kg
Representing Romania
European Championships
Silver medal – second place	2025 Chișinău	109 kg
Silver medal – second place	2026 Batumi	110 kg

Luis Manuel Lauret Rodríguez (born 20 January 1997) is a Cuban born Romanian weightlifter. He is a multiple medallist in the heavyweight event both Pan America and Europe. His best result was the silver medal at the 2025 World Championships at the men's 110 kg event snatch category.

== Major results ==
Year	Venue	Weight	Snatch (kg)				Clean & Jerk (kg)				Total	Rank
Year	Venue	Weight	1	2	3	Rank	1	2	3	Rank	Total	Rank
Representing Romania
World Championships
2025	Førde, Norway	110 kg	185	~~188~~	188	2nd place, silver medalist(s)	~~213~~	~~215~~	~~217~~	—	—	—
2026	Ningbo, China	110 kg	190	194	~~198~~	2nd place, silver medalist(s)	216	222	~~226~~	7	416	4
European Championships
2026	(Georgia (country)) Batumi, Georgia	110 kg	185	190	195	1st place, gold medalist(s)	213	219	~~223~~	5	414	2nd place, silver medalist(s)
Representing Cuba
World Championships
2018	Ashgabat, Turkmenistan	+109 kg	173	180	183	12	~~213~~	~~213~~	~~213~~	—	—	—
Pan American Games
2019	Lima, Peru	+109 kg	176	181	~~190~~	2	211	218	~~230~~	2	399	2nd place, silver medalist(s)
Pan American Championships
2019	Guatemala City, Guatemala	+109	175	180	183	2nd place, silver medalist(s)	211	217	220	2nd place, silver medalist(s)	400	2nd place, silver medalist(s)
2018	Santo Domingo, Dominican Republic	+105	162	168	172	3rd place, bronze medalist(s)	200	206	210	3rd place, bronze medalist(s)	382	3rd place, bronze medalist(s)
2017	Miami, United States	+105	~~166~~	~~166~~	~~166~~	—	193	200	205	3rd place, bronze medalist(s)	—	—
2016	Cartagena, Colombia	105	150	155	160	6	180	~~185~~	~~185~~	10	340	7
