= Weightlifting at the 2019 Pan American Games – Men's 96 kg =

Weightlifting – Men's 96kg at the 2019 Pan American Games
- Venue: Coliseo Mariscal Caceres
- Dates: July 29
- Competitors: 16 from 14 nations

Medalists
Gold medal	Jhonatan Rivas	Colombia
Silver medal	Boady Santavy	Canada
Bronze medal	Keydomar Vallenilla	Venezuela

The men's 96 kg competition of the weightlifting events at the 2019 Pan American Games in Lima, Peru, was held on July 29 at the Coliseo Mariscal Caceres.

== Results ==
16 athletes from fourteen countries took part.

Rank	Athlete	Nation	Group	Snatch (kg)				Clean & Jerk (kg)				Total
Rank	Athlete	Nation	Group	1	2	3	Result	1	2	3	Result	Total
1st place, gold medalist(s)	Jhonatan Rivas	Colombia	A	170	175	~~177~~	175	205	210	—	210	385
2nd place, silver medalist(s)	Boady Santavy	Canada	A	166	171	176	176	203	208	~~215~~	208	384
3rd place, bronze medalist(s)	Keydomar Vallenilla	Venezuela	A	165	169	~~171~~	169	200	205	~~207~~	205	374
4	Olfides Sáez	Cuba	A	155	~~160~~	160	160	195	200	206	206	366
5	Serafim Veli	Brazil	A	163	167	170	170	~~192~~	195	~~203~~	195	365
6	Angel Luna	Venezuela	A	~~162~~	162	~~168~~	162	202	~~213~~	~~213~~	202	364
7	Marco Gregorio	Brazil	A	~~165~~	~~165~~	166	166	192	~~197~~	~~198~~	192	358
8	Nathan Damron	United States	A	155	~~160~~	160	160	195	~~200~~	~~203~~	195	355
9	Wilmer Contreras	Ecuador	A	151	156	~~160~~	156	190	195	~~198~~	195	351
10	Maximiliano Kienitz	Argentina	B	148	~~152~~	~~152~~	148	180	~~185~~	~~185~~	180	328
11	Luis Lamenza	Puerto Rico	B	140	~~145~~	145	145	165	175	~~185~~	175	320
12	Camilo Zapata	Chile	B	130	~~136~~	136	136	160	168	175	175	311
13	Enrique Juanico	Uruguay	B	127	~~132~~	132	132	155	~~160~~	~~161~~	155	287
14	Juan Carlos Álvarez	El Salvador	B	125	~~131~~	~~131~~	125	155	160	~~165~~	160	285
15	Amel Atencia	Peru	B	~~123~~	123	~~127~~	123	150	160	~~165~~	160	283
16	Mario Araya	Costa Rica	B	115	120	~~125~~	120	150	~~156~~	156	156	276
