= Julio Cedeño =

Dominican Republic weightlifter (born 1992)

Personal information
- Born: 16 October 1992 (age 33)

Sport
- Country: Dominican Republic
- Sport: Weightlifting
- Weight class: 73 kg
Medal record
Men's weightlifting
Representing Dominican Republic
Pan American Games
Bronze medal – third place	2019 Lima	73 kg
Pan American Championships
Gold medal – first place	2021 Guayaquil	73 kg
Gold medal – first place	2022 Bogotá	73 kg
Central American and Caribbean Games
Silver medal – second place	2018 Barranquilla	69 kg S
Bronze medal – third place	2018 Barranquilla	69 kg CJ

Julio Cedeño (born 16 October 1992) is a Dominican Republic weightlifter. He is a two-time gold medalist in the men's 73 kg event at the Pan American Weightlifting Championships (2021 and 2022). He won the bronze medal in the men's 73 kg event at the 2019 Pan American Games held in Lima, Peru.

== Career ==
He won two medals in his events at the 2018 Central American and Caribbean Games held in Barranquilla, Colombia.

At the 2019 Pan American Weightlifting Championships held in Guatemala City, Guatemala, he finished in 4th place in the men's 73 kg event. A few months later, he won the bronze medal in the men's 73 kg event at the 2019 Pan American Games held in Lima, Peru. He finished in 4th place in his event at the 2020 Pan American Weightlifting Championships held in Santo Domingo, Dominican Republic.

In 2021, he won the gold medal in his event at the Pan American Weightlifting Championships held in Guayaquil, Ecuador. He also won the gold medal in his event at the 2022 Pan American Weightlifting Championships held in Bogotá, Colombia.

== Achievements ==
Year	Venue	Weight	Snatch (kg)				Clean & Jerk (kg)				Total	Rank
Year	Venue	Weight	1	2	3	Rank	1	2	3	Rank	Total	Rank
Pan American Games
2019	Lima, Peru	73 kg	137	141	144	—N/a	170	174	—	—N/a	318	3rd place, bronze medalist(s)
Pan American Championships
2019	Guatemala City, Guatemala	73 kg	132	136	140	4	165	170	~~173~~	4	310	4
2020	Santo Domingo, Dominican Republic	73 kg	133	141	~~144~~	4	160	168	~~171~~	4	309	4
2021	Guayaquil, Ecuador	73 kg	135	138	141	1st place, gold medalist(s)	165	170	174	1st place, gold medalist(s)	315	1st place, gold medalist(s)
2022	Bogotá, Colombia	73 kg	136	141	144	2nd place, silver medalist(s)	167	171	174	1st place, gold medalist(s)	318	1st place, gold medalist(s)
Central American and Caribbean Games
2018	Barranquilla, Colombia	69 kg	~~132~~	132	136	2nd place, silver medalist(s)	164	168	—	3rd place, bronze medalist(s)	—N/a	—N/a
