= Weightlifting at the 2019 Pan American Games – Men's 109 kg =

Weightlifting – Men's 109kg at the 2019 Pan American Games
- Venue: Coliseo Mariscal Caceres
- Dates: July 29
- Competitors: 9 from 7 nations

Medalists
Gold medal	Wesley Kitts	United States
Silver medal	Jesús González	Venezuela
Bronze medal	Jorge Arroyo	Ecuador

The men's 109 kg competition of the weightlifting events at the 2019 Pan American Games in Lima, Peru, was held on July 29 at the Coliseo Mariscal Caceres.

== Results ==
9 athletes from seven countries took part.

Rank	Athlete	Nation	Group	Snatch (kg)				Clean & Jerk (kg)				Total
Rank	Athlete	Nation	Group	1	2	3	Result	1	2	3	Result	Total
1st place, gold medalist(s)	Wesley Kitts	United States	A	165	171	~~172~~	172	207	214	217	217	389
2nd place, silver medalist(s)	Jesús González	Venezuela	A	170	175	178	178	210	~~215~~	~~216~~	210	388
3rd place, bronze medalist(s)	Jorge Arroyo	Ecuador	A	180	185	190	190	195	~~200~~	~~200~~	195	385
4	Juan Columbié	Cuba	A	170	~~175~~	175	175	205	~~211~~	~~211~~	205	380
5	Jeyson Arias	Venezuela	A	~~160~~	160	166	166	202	~~207~~	~~210~~	202	368
6	Hernán Viera	Peru	A	130	135	140	140	180	~~190~~	~~195~~	180	320
7	Rodrigo Marra	Uruguay	A	125	130	135	135	155	~~160~~	164	164	299
8	Henry Cerdas	Costa Rica	A	104	109	~~113~~	109	141	147	153	153	262
	Dixon Arroyo	Ecuador	A	~~155~~	~~155~~	~~155~~	—	—	—	—	—	—

== New records ==
Snatch	185 kg	Jorge Arroyo (ECU)	AM, PR
Sntach	190 kg	Jorge Arroyo (ECU)	AM, PR
