= Weightlifting at the 2019 Pan American Games – Men's 73 kg =

Weightlifting – Men's 73kg at the 2019 Pan American Games
- Venue: Coliseo Mariscal Caceres
- Dates: July 28
- Competitors: 11 from 10 nations

Medalists
Gold medal	Julio Mayora	Venezuela
Silver medal	Luis Javier Mosquera	Colombia
Bronze medal	Julio Cedeño	Dominican Republic

The men's 73 kg competition of the weightlifting events at the 2019 Pan American Games in Lima, Peru, was held on July 28 at the Coliseo Mariscal Caceres.

== Results ==
11 athletes from ten countries took part.

Rank	Athlete	Nation	Group	Snatch (kg)				Clean & Jerk (kg)				Total
Rank	Athlete	Nation	Group	1	2	3	Result	1	2	3	Result	Total
1st place, gold medalist(s)	Julio Mayora	Venezuela	A	152	155	~~157~~	155	185	194	~~197~~	194	349
2nd place, silver medalist(s)	Luis Javier Mosquera	Colombia	A	150	~~155~~	~~155~~	150	175	~~180~~	~~185~~	175	325
3rd place, bronze medalist(s)	Julio Cedeño	Dominican Republic	A	137	141	144	144	170	174	—	174	318
4	Jorge Cárdenas	Mexico	A	138	142	~~145~~	142	~~168~~	168	~~173~~	168	310
5	Óscar Terrones	Peru	A	133	137	141	141	163	~~170~~	~~170~~	163	304
6	Óscar Valdizón	Guatemala	A	127	~~132~~	~~132~~	127	160	165	~~169~~	165	292
7	Jorge Hernández	Honduras	A	125	~~130~~	~~130~~	125	165	~~169~~	~~169~~	165	290
8	Bastián López	Chile	A	120	125	~~128~~	125	155	160	~~168~~	160	285
9	Santiago Villegas	Peru	A	117	122	~~125~~	122	150	155	160	160	282
	Jorge Sánchez Vélez	Puerto Rico	A	132	~~136~~	~~136~~	132	~~171~~	~~171~~	~~171~~	—	—
	Ariel Batista	Panama	A	110	—	—	110	—	—	—	—	DNF

== New records ==
Snatch	155 kg	Julio Mayora (VEN)	AM, PR
Clean & Jerk	194 kg	Julio Mayora (VEN)	AM, PR
Total	349 kg	Julio Mayora (VEN)	AM, PR
