= Weightlifting at the 2019 Pan American Games =

- Weightlifting pictogram
- Venue: Coliseo Mariscal Caceres
- Dates: July 27–30, 2019
- No. of events: 14 (7 men, 7 women)
- Competitors: 123 from 20 nations

Weightlifting competitions at the 2019 Pan American Games in Lima, Peru are scheduled to be held between July 27 and 30, 2019 at the Coliseo Mariscal Caceres. The venue will also host the bodybuilding competitions.

In 2016, the International Olympic Committee made several changes to its sports program, which were subsequently implemented for these games. Included in the changes was a reduction of one men's weightlifting event. This means a total of 14 weightlifting events will be contested (seven per gender). A total of 126 weightlifters will qualify to compete at the games.

This event will serve as one of the events that will allow athletes to post qualifying weights for the weightlifting competitions at the 2020 Summer Olympics in Tokyo, Japan.

== Medal table ==
* Host nation (Peru)

Rank	Nation	Gold	Silver	Bronze	Total
1	Colombia	5	4	0	9
2	United States	2	1	2	5
2	Venezuela	2	1	2	5
4	Dominican Republic	1	3	2	6
5	Ecuador	1	1	4	6
6	Mexico	1	1	3	5
7	Brazil	1	0	0	1
7	Chile	1	0	0	1
9	Canada	0	1	0	1
9	Cuba	0	1	0	1
9	Guatemala	0	1	0	1
12	Peru*	0	0	1	1
Totals (12 entries)		14	14	14	42

== Medalists ==
=== Men's events ===
Event	Gold	Silver	Bronze
61 kg	Francisco Mosquera; Colombia	Jhon Serna; Colombia	Antonio Vázquez; Mexico
67 kg	Jonathan Muñoz; Mexico	Edgar Pineda; Guatemala	Luis Bardalez; Peru
73 kg	Julio Mayora; Venezuela	Luis Javier Mosquera; Colombia	Julio Cedeño; Dominican Republic
81 kg	Brayan Rodallegas; Colombia	Zacarías Bonnat; Dominican Republic	Harrison Maurus; United States
96 kg	Jhonatan Rivas; Colombia	Boady Santavy; Canada	Keydomar Vallenilla; Venezuela
109 kg	Wesley Kitts; United States	Jesús González; Venezuela	Jorge Arroyo; Ecuador
+109 kg	Fernando Reis; Brazil	Luis Lauret; Cuba	Raúl Manríquez; Mexico

=== Women's events ===
Event	Gold	Silver	Bronze
49 kg	Beatriz Pirón; Dominican Republic	Ana Segura; Colombia	Santa Cotes; Dominican Republic
55 kg	Génesis Rodríguez; Venezuela	Yenny Sinisterra; Colombia	Ana Gabriela López; Mexico
59 kg	María Lobón; Colombia	Alexandra Escobar; Ecuador	Yusleidy Figueroa; Venezuela
64 kg	Mercedes Pérez; Colombia	Mattie Sasser; United States	Angie Palacios; Ecuador
76 kg	Neisi Dájomes; Ecuador	Aremi Fuentes; Mexico	Katherine Nye; United States
87 kg	María Fernanda Valdés; Chile	Crismery Santana; Dominican Republic	Tamara Salazar; Ecuador
+87 kg	Sarah Robles; United States	Verónica Saladín; Dominican Republic	Lisseth Ayoví; Ecuador

== Participating nations ==
A total of 20 countries qualified athletes. The number of weightlifters a nation has entered is in parentheses beside the name of the country. A total of 123 lifters were entered.

- Argentina (5)
- Brazil (5)
- Canada (4)
- Chile (5)
- Colombia (12)
- Costa Rica (3)
- Cuba (8)
- Dominican Republic (7)
- Ecuador (11)
- El Salvador (3)
- Guatemala (6)
- Honduras (1)
- Mexico (8)
- Nicaragua (2)
- Panama (3)
- Peru (12)
- Puerto Rico (5)
- United States (10)
- Uruguay (3)
- Venezuela (10)

== Qualification ==
A total of 126 weightlifters (63 per gender) will qualify to compete at the games. A nation may enter a maximum of 12 weightlifters (six per gender). The host nation (Peru) automatically qualified the maximum team size. All other nations qualified through their team scores from both the 2017 and 2018 Pan American Championships combined. A further two wild cards were awarded (one per gender).

== See also ==
- Powerlifting at the 2019 Parapan American Games
- Weightlifting at the 2020 Summer Olympics
