= Fernando Reis =

Brazilian weightlifter (born 1990)

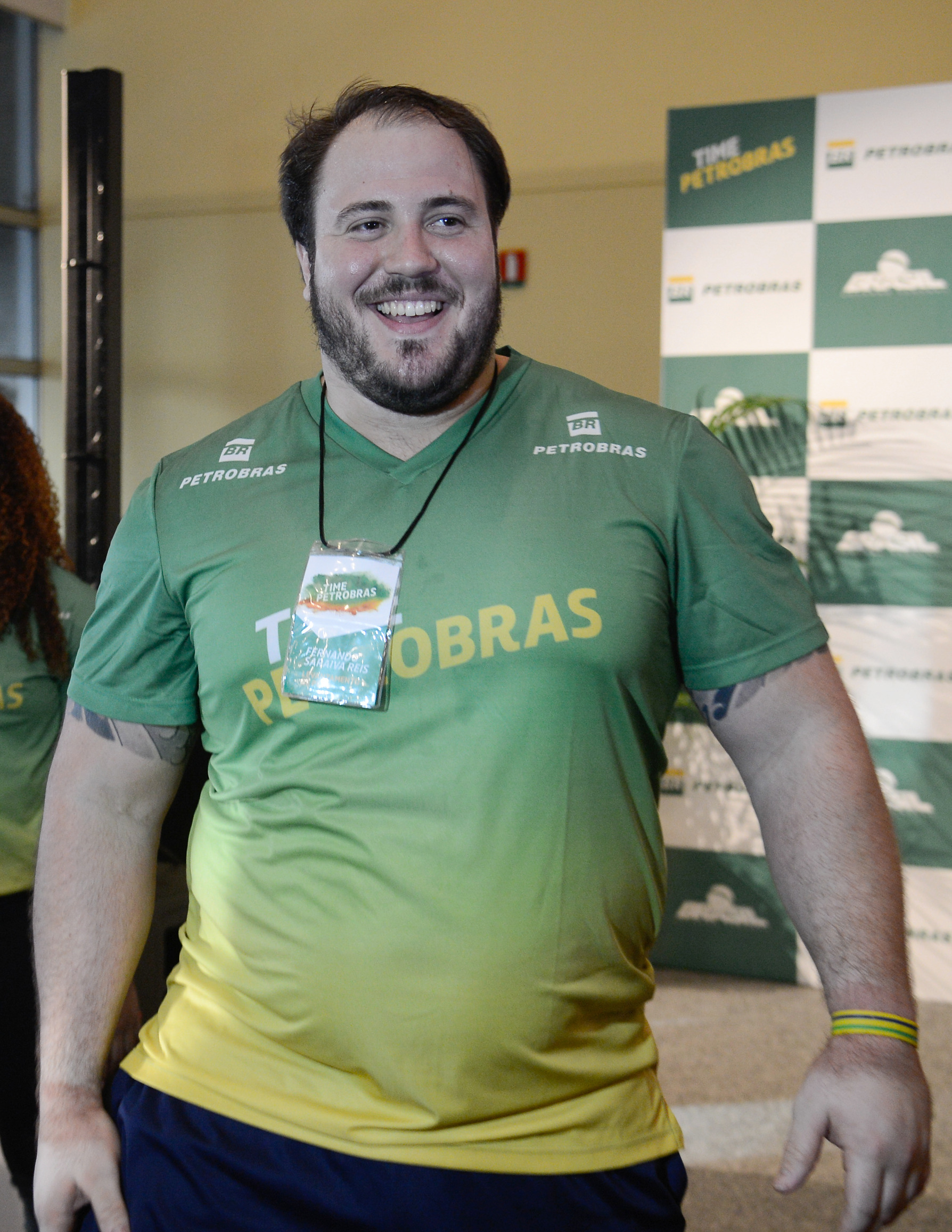
- Reis in 2016

Personal information
- Nationality: (Brazil) Brazilian
- Born: March 10, 1990 (age 36) São Paulo, São Paulo
- Height: 185 cm (6 ft 1 in)
- Weight: 146 kg (322 lb)

Sport
- Sport: Weightlifting
- Club: Pinheiros
- Coached by: Luis López

Achievements and titles
- Personal bests: Snatch: 201 kg (2018, Santo Domingo); Clean & Jerk: 240 kg (2016, Rio de Janeiro); Total: 440 kg (2017, Anaheim)
Medal record
Men's weightlifting
Representing Brazil
World Championships
Bronze medal – third place	2018 Ashgabat	+109 kg
Pan American Games
Gold medal – first place	2011 Guadalajara	+105 kg
Gold medal – first place	2015 Toronto	+105 kg
Gold medal – first place	2019 Lima	+109 kg
Pan American Championships
Gold medal – first place	2012 Antigua Guatemala	+105 kg
Gold medal – first place	2013 Caracas	+105 kg
Gold medal – first place	2018 Santo Domingo	+105 kg
Gold medal – first place	2020 Santo Domingo	+109 kg
South American Games
Gold medal – first place	2014 Santiago	+105 kg
Silver medal – second place	2010 Medellín	+105 kg

Fernando Saraiva Reis (born March 10, 1990) is a Brazilian weightlifter. He competed at the 2012 Summer Olympics and the 2016 Rio Games, finishing 11th and 5th, respectively. He won a bronze medal in the 2018 World Championships and is a three-time Pan American Games champion.

== Career ==
Reis competed at the 2010 Junior World Weightlifting Championships, winning the bronze medal in Snatch and placed fourth in Total. This was Brazil's first-ever medal at the Weightlifting World Championships in any age group, gender or weight class. That same year, he won a silver medal at the 2010 South American Games.

In April 2011, Reis tested positive for methylhexanamine and was suspended for six months. He returned just in time to win the gold medal in the 105+ kg category at the 2011 Pan American Games. With this performance, he became the first Brazilian weightlifter to win a gold medal in the Pan American Games.

Reis originally placed 12th at the 2012 Olympics in the +105 kg event but was bumped up to 11th after Yauheni Zharnasek failed a doping retest in 2016. In 2015, Reis won the gold medal at the Pan American Games with the championship and Brazilian record (Snatch: 192 kg, Clean and jerk: 235 kg, Total: 427 kg). Reis finished in 10th at the 2015 World Weightlifting Championships and set the Brazilian record in snatch with 195 kg.

At the 2016 Summer Olympics, he finished 5th in the Men's +105 kg and broke the Panamerican Record in the Clean and Jerk and Total (195 in Snatch and 240 in Clean & Jerk, a total of 435 kg). In 2019, he won his third consecutive gold medal at the 2019 Pan American Games in the +109 kg category.

At the 2018 Pan American Weightlifting, he again broke his Americas Snatch record by lifting 201 kg. In the Clean & Jerk, he made 235 kg, and in the overall total, 436 kg, winning gold in all three events.

At the 2018 World Championships, held in November, Reis obtained a historic 4th place for Brazil in the overall total, the country's best position of all time, with the mark of 436 kg (201 kg in the snatch and 235 kg in the Clean & Jerk). He came very close to winning the bronze medal when he lifted the weight to 245 kg in the Clean & Jerk, but the judges did not consider the lift valid because of the position of the arms. On March 20, 2021, the International Weightlifting Federation announced that Rustam Djangabaev's results at the 2018 World Championships had been nullified. Reis was then promoted to bronze medal in total and fourth in both snatch and clean & jerk. This was Brazil's first medal in the history of the World Weightlifting Championships.

At the Pan American Games in Lima 2019, despite still recovering from knee surgery performed at the end of 2018, he easily won the third championship, lifting 420 kg in total, against 399 for the athlete who won silver.

== Records ==
He has set 5 Panamerican records and he currently owns the Panamerican record for all three lifts in the +105 kg weight category.

- Snatch: 201 kg (2018, Santo Domingo)
- Clean & Jerk: 240 kg (2016, Rio de Janeiro)
- Total: 440 kg (2017, Anaheim)

== Personal life ==
Reis took up weightlifting aged 11. He is a fan of car racing, his idol in sport is Ayrton Senna.

== Major results ==
Year	Venue	Weight	Snatch (kg)				Clean & Jerk (kg)				Total	Rank
Year	Venue	Weight	1	2	3	Rank	1	2	3	Rank	Total	Rank
Olympic Games
2012	London, United Kingdom	+105 kg	178	180	~~186~~	12	220	~~225~~	--	11	400	11
2016	Rio de Janeiro, Brazil	+105 kg	190	~~195~~	195	5	240 PMR	~~245~~	~~247~~	5	435 PMR	5
World Championships
2010	Antalya, Turkey	+105 kg	~~155~~	~~155~~	155	29	~~190~~	190	--	27	345	26
2011	Paris, France	+105 kg	170	176	~~181~~	20	207	212	217	16	393	17
2013	Wrocław, Poland	+105 kg	~~182~~	182	~~188~~	10	223	228	~~230~~	6	410	7
2014	Almaty, Kazakhstan	+105 kg	182	~~190~~	190	8	225	230	~~235~~	7	420	9
2015	Houston, United States	+105 kg	190	~~195~~	195	7	230	~~240~~	~~240~~	12	425	10
2017	Anaheim, United States	+105 kg	192	200 PMR	~~204~~	4	240	~~247~~	~~248~~	6	440 PMR	6
2018	Ashgabat, Turkmenistan	+109 kg	193	198	201	4	235	~~245~~	~~246~~	4	436	3rd place, bronze medalist(s)
2019	Pattaya, Thailand	+109 kg	185	~~191~~	192	5	225	232	~~236~~	9	424	8
Pan American Games
2011	Guadalajara, Mexico	+105 kg	176	181	185	1	211	216	225	1	410	1st place, gold medalist(s)
2015	Toronto, Canada	+105 kg	180	192	~~195~~	1	221	235	--	1	427	1st place, gold medalist(s)
2019	Lima, Peru	+109 kg	180	185	190	1	212	220	230	1	420	1st place, gold medalist(s)
Pan American Championships
2010	Guatemala City, Guatemala	+105kg	165	--	--	4	203	--	--	5	368	4
2012	Antigua, Guatemala	+105kg	180	~~190~~	~~190~~	1st place, gold medalist(s)	220	230	~~235~~	1st place, gold medalist(s)	410	1st place, gold medalist(s)
2013	Isla Margarita, Venezuela	+105kg	175	180	~~187~~	1st place, gold medalist(s)	217	222	227	1st place, gold medalist(s)	407	1st place, gold medalist(s)
2014	Santo Domingo, Dominican Republic	+105kg	180	187	~~191~~	1st place, gold medalist(s)	~~215~~	--	--	--	--	--
2018	Santo Domingo, Dominican Republic	+105kg	190	196	201 PMR	1st place, gold medalist(s)	226	235	~~245~~	1st place, gold medalist(s)	436	1st place, gold medalist(s)
