= Welisson Silva =

Brazilian weightlifter

Personal information
- Full name: Wellison Rosa da Silva
- Nationality: Brazil
- Born: 22 November 1983 (age 42) Viçosa, Minas Gerais
- Height: 1.60 m (5 ft 3 in)
- Weight: 69 kg (152 lb)

Sport
- Sport: Weightlifting
- Event: 69 kg

Welisson Rosa da Silva (born November 22, 1983, in Viçosa, Minas Gerais) is a Brazilian weightlifter. He represented Brazil at the 2008 Summer Olympics in Beijing, where he placed eighteenth in the men's lightweight category (69 kg), with a snatch of 135 kg, and a clean and jerk of 155 kg, for a total of 290 kg.
