= 2018 Pan American Weightlifting Championships =

Weightlifting competition

2018 Pan American Championships
- Host city: Santo Domingo, Dominican Republic
- Dates: May 12 – 19
- Main venue: Weightlifting Pavilion Dr. José Joaquín Puello

The 2018 Pan American Weightlifting Championships was held in Santo Domingo, Dominican Republic between May 12 and May 19, 2018.

A total of 126 weightlifters qualified to compete at the 2019 Pan American Games through scores from both the 2017 and 2018 Pan American Championships combined. A nation may enter a maximum of 12 weightlifters (six per gender). The host nation (Peru) automatically qualified the maximum team size.

== Medal summary ==
Results are obtained from the Pan American Weightlifting Federation website.

=== Men ===
Event	Gold		Silver		Bronze	
56 kg
Snatch	Luis García; Dominican Republic	122 kg	Carlos Berna; Colombia	117 kg	Wilder Posada; Colombia	114 kg
Clean & Jerk	Luis García; Dominican Republic	153 kg	Carlos Berna; Colombia	146 kg	Otto Onate; Cuba	140 kg
Total	Luis García; Dominican Republic	275 kg	Carlos Berna; Colombia	263 kg	Wilder Posada; Colombia	250 kg
62 kg
Snatch	Christian Zurita; Ecuador	128 kg	Luis Higuita; Colombia	127 kg	José Montes; Mexico	120 kg
Clean & Jerk	Antonio Vázquez; Mexico	171 kg	José Montes; Mexico	162 kg	Luis Higuita; Colombia	154 kg
Total	Antonio Vázquez; Mexico	291 kg	José Montes; Mexico	282 kg	Luis Higuita; Colombia	281 kg
69 kg
Snatch	Julio Mayora; Venezuela	145 kg	Clarence Cummings; United States	144 kg	Jorge Cárdenas; Mexico	135 kg
Clean & Jerk	Clarence Cummings; United States	180 kg	Julio Mayora; Venezuela	180 kg	William Alvarado; Brazil	166 kg
Total	Julio Mayora; Venezuela	325 kg	Clarence Cummings; United States	324 kg	Jonathan Muñoz; Mexico	299 kg
77 kg
Snatch	Hugo Montes; Colombia	160 kg	Addriel La O Garcia; Cuba	150 kg	Yony Andica; Colombia	150 kg
Clean & Jerk	Yony Andica; Colombia	186 kg	Addriel La O Garcia; Cuba	185 kg	Hugo Montes; Colombia	182 kg
Total	Hugo Montes; Colombia	342 kg	Yony Andica; Colombia	336 kg	Addriel La O Garcia; Cuba	335 kg
85 kg
Snatch	Arley Méndez; Chile	170 kg	Brayan Rodallegas; Colombia	166 kg	Keydomar Vallenilla; Venezuela	162 kg
Clean & Jerk	Arley Méndez; Chile	211 kg PMR	Brayan Rodallegas; Colombia	201 kg	Olfides Sáez; Cuba	200 kg
Total	Arley Méndez; Chile	381 kg PMR	Brayan Rodallegas; Colombia	367 kg	Olfides Sáez; Cuba	358 kg
94 kg
Snatch	Víctor Quiñones; Cuba	168 kg	Serafim Veli; Brazil	162 kg	Jeyson Arias; Venezuela	161 kg
Clean & Jerk	Jeyson Arias; Venezuela	201 kg	Yorbanis Martínez; Cuba	196 kg	Víctor Quiñones; Cuba	196 kg
Total	Víctor Quiñones; Cuba	364 kg	Jeyson Arias; Venezuela	362 kg	Serafim Veli; Brazil	353 kg
105 kg
Snatch	Jorge Arroyo; Ecuador	185 kg	Wesley Kitts; United States	172 kg	Jesús González; Venezuela	171 kg
Clean & Jerk	Wesley Kitts; United States	212 kg	Jesús González; Venezuela	208 kg	Hernán Viera; Peru	208 kg
Total	Wesley Kitts; United States	384 kg	Jorge Arroyo; Ecuador	382 kg	Jesús González; Venezuela	379 kg
+105 kg
Snatch	Fernando Reis; Brazil	201 kg PMR	Caine Wilkes; United States	183 kg	Luis Lauret; Cuba	172 kg
Clean & Jerk	Fernando Reis; Brazil	235 kg	Caine Wilkes; United States	219 kg	Luis Lauret; Cuba	210 kg
Total	Fernando Reis; Brazil	436 kg	Caine Wilkes; United States	402 kg	Luis Lauret; Cuba	382 kg

=== Women ===
Event	Gold		Silver		Bronze	
48 kg
Snatch	Andrea de la Herrán; Mexico	80 kg	Georgina Silvestre; Dominican Republic	79 kg	Ludia Montero; Cuba	78 kg
Clean & Jerk	Socorro Villa; Mexico	98 kg	Andrea de la Herrán; Mexico	97 kg	Mercedes Campoverde; Ecuador	96 kg
Total	Andrea de la Herrán; Mexico	177 kg	Socorro Villa; Mexico	174 kg	Ludia Montero; Cuba	172 kg
53 kg
Snatch	Beatriz Pirón; Dominican Republic	90 kg	Caitlin Hogan; United States	86 kg	Ana López; Mexico	85 kg
Clean & Jerk	Vanessa Quiñones; Colombia	109 kg	Tessy Sandi; Peru	108 kg	Caitlin Hogan; United States	107 kg
Total	Beatriz Pirón; Dominican Republic	196 kg	Caitlin Hogan; United States	193 kg	Vanessa Quiñones; Colombia	193 kg
58 kg
Snatch	Karool Blanco; Colombia	96 kg	María Lobón; Colombia	95 kg	Alexandra Escobar; Ecuador	94 kg
Clean & Jerk	Quisisa Guicho; Mexico	119 kg	Alexandra Escobar; Ecuador	118 kg	Karool Blanco; Colombia	116 kg
Total	Karool Blanco; Colombia	212 kg	Alexandra Escobar; Ecuador	212 kg	Quisisa Guicho; Mexico	210 kg
63 kg
Snatch	Natalia Llamosa; Colombia	101 kg	Marina Rodríguez; Cuba	98 kg	Jackelina Heredia; Colombia	98 kg
Clean & Jerk	Jackelina Heredia; Colombia	126 kg	Marina Rodríguez; Cuba	125 kg	Natalia Llamosa; Colombia	124 kg
Total	Natalia Llamosa; Colombia	225 kg	Jackelina Heredia; Colombia	224 kg	Marina Rodríguez; Cuba	223 kg
69 kg
Snatch	Mercedes Pérez; Colombia	104 kg	Mattie Rogers; United States	99 kg	Yaneisy Merino; Cuba	96 kg
Clean & Jerk	Mercedes Pérez; Colombia	130 kg	Mattie Rogers; United States	130 kg	Yaneisy Merino; Cuba	120 kg
Total	Mercedes Pérez; Colombia	234 kg	Mattie Rogers; United States	229 kg	Yaneisy Merino; Cuba	216 kg
75 kg
Snatch	Neisi Dájomes; Ecuador	111 kg	Aremi Fuentes; Mexico	110 kg	Jenny Arthur; United States	108 kg
Clean & Jerk	Neisi Dájomes; Ecuador	137 kg	Aremi Fuentes; Mexico	136 kg	Tamara Salazar; Ecuador	131 kg
Total	Neisi Dájomes; Ecuador	248 kg	Aremi Fuentes; Mexico	246 kg	Jenny Arthur; United States	235 kg
90 kg
Snatch	Crismery Santana; Dominican Republic	116 kg PMR	María Fernanda Valdés; Chile	110 kg	Naryury Pérez; Venezuela	109 kg
Clean & Jerk	María Fernanda Valdés; Chile	143 kg	Crismery Santana; Dominican Republic	142 kg	Naryury Pérez; Venezuela	135 kg
Total	Crismery Santana; Dominican Republic	258 kg PMR	María Fernanda Valdés; Chile	253 kg	Naryury Pérez; Venezuela	244 kg
+90 kg
Snatch	Verónica Saladín; Dominican Republic	124 kg	Sarah Robles; United States	123 kg	Tania Mascorro; Mexico	120 kg
Clean & Jerk	Sarah Robles; United States	157 kg	Tania Mascorro; Mexico	146 kg	Verónica Saladín; Dominican Republic	145 kg
Total	Sarah Robles; United States	280 kg	Verónica Saladín; Dominican Republic	269 kg	Tania Mascorro; Mexico	266 kg

== Medals tables ==
=== Results including snatch and clean & jerk medals ===
Rank	Nation	Gold	Silver	Bronze	Total
1	Colombia (COL)	12	10	10	32
2	Dominican Republic (DOM)	8	3	1	12
3	Mexico (MEX)	6	8	7	21
4	United States (USA)	5	12	3	20
5	Ecuador (ECU)	5	3	3	11
6	Chile (CHI)	4	2	0	6
7	Venezuela (VEN)	3	3	7	13
8	Brazil (BRA)	3	1	2	6
9	Cuba (CUB)	2	5	14	21
10	Peru (PER)	0	1	1	2
Totals (10 entries)		48	48	48	144

=== Total results ===
Rank	Nation	Gold	Silver	Bronze	Total
1	Colombia (COL)	4	4	3	11
2	Dominican Republic (DOM)	3	1	0	4
3	United States (USA)	2	4	1	7
4	Mexico (MEX)	2	3	3	8
5	Ecuador (ECU)	1	2	0	3
6	Venezuela (VEN)	1	1	2	4
7	Chile (CHI)	1	1	0	2
8	Cuba (CUB)	1	0	6	7
9	Brazil (BRA)	1	0	1	2
Totals (9 entries)		16	16	16	48

== Team ranking ==
=== Men ===
Rank	Team	Points
1	Venezuela	537
2	Ecuador	504
3	Cuba	481
4	Mexico	478
5	Colombia	443
6	United States	435
7	Dominican Republic	425
8	Chile	415
9	Guatemala	399
10	Peru	300

=== Women ===
Rank	Team	Points
1	United States	536
2	Dominican Republic	526
3	Ecuador	525
4	Colombia	523
5	Mexico	518
6	Cuba	493
7	Venezuela	478
8	Guatemala	345
9	Chile	328
10	Argentina	326
