= Fernando Salas (weightlifter) =

Ecuadorian weightlifter

Personal information
- Full name: Fernando Fabricio Salas Manguis
- Born: 10 February 1988 (age 38)
- Height: 1.86 m (6 ft 1 in)
- Weight: 157.48 kg (347 lb)

Sport
- Country: Ecuador
- Sport: Weightlifting
Medal record
Men's weightlifting
Representing Ecuador
Pan American Games
| Bronze medal – third place | 2015 Toronto | +105 kg |
- Updated on 9 April 2017

Fernando Fabricio Salas Manguis (born February 10, 1988) is an Ecuadorian male weightlifter, competing in the +105 kg category and representing Ecuador at international competitions. He participated in the men's +105 kg event at the 2015 World Weightlifting Championships, and at the 2016 Summer Olympics, finishing in fourteenth position. He won the bronze medal in the same weight category at the 2015 Pan American Games.

== Major results ==
| Year | Venue | Weight | Snatch (kg) | | | | Clean & Jerk (kg) | | | | Total | Rank |
| Year | Venue | Weight | 1 | 2 | 3 | Rank | 1 | 2 | 3 | Rank | Total | Rank |
World Championships
| 2015 | Houston, United States | +105 kg | ~~168~~ | 170 | ~~175~~ | 24 | 200 | 205 | 211 | 23 | 381 | 22 |
| 2014 | Almaty, Kazakhstan | +105 kg | 165 | 170 | 175 | 19 | 200 | 205 | --- | 23 | 380 | 21 |
Pan American Games
| 2015 | Toronto, Canada | +105 kg | 165 | 170 | ~~175~~ | —N/a | 195 | 200 | --- | —N/a | 370 | 3rd place, bronze medalist(s) |
