= Weightlifting at the 2017 Summer Universiade – Men's 69 kg =

Men's 69 kg at the XXIX Summer Universiade
- Venues: Tamkang University Shao-Mo Memorial Gymnasium 7F
- Dates: 21 August 2017
- Competitors: 21 from 19 nations

Medalists
1st place, gold medalist(s)		Albert Linder	Kazakhstan
2nd place, silver medalist(s)		Kim Myong-hyok	North Korea
3rd place, bronze medalist(s)		Masanori Miyamoto	Japan

The men's 69 kg event at the 2017 Summer Universiade was held on 21 August at the Tamkang University Shao-Mo Memorial Gymnasium 7F.

== Records ==
Prior to this competition, the existing world and Universiade records were as follows.

- Initial records

Category		Nation	Athlete	Record	Place	Date	Meet
World record	Snatch	China	Liao Hui	166 kg	Almaty, Kazakhstan	10 November 2014	2014 World Championships
World record	Clean & Jerk	China	Liao Hui	198 kg	Wrocław, Poland	23 October 2013	2013 World Championships
World record	Total	China	Liao Hui	359 kg	Almaty, Kazakhstan	10 November 2014	2014 World Championships
Universiade records	Snatch	China (CHN)	Jin Jiantao	151 kg	Kazan, Russia	9 July 2013	2013 Summer Universiade
Universiade records	Clean & Jerk	Indonesia (INA)	Deni	178 kg	Shenzhen, China	15 August 2011	2011 Summer Universiade
Universiade records	Total	Iran (IRI)	Jaber Behrouzi	322 kg	Kazan, Russia	9 July 2013	2013 Summer Universiade

- Broken records

Category		Nation	Athlete	Record	Place	Date
Universiade records	Snatch	North Korea (PRK)	Kim Myong-hyok	153 kg	New Taipei, Taiwan	21 August 2017
Universiade records	Clean & Jerk	Kazakhstan (KAZ)	Albert Linder	185 kg	New Taipei, Taiwan	21 August 2017
Universiade records	Total	Kazakhstan (KAZ)	Albert Linder	333 kg	New Taipei, Taiwan	21 August 2017

== Results ==
Rank	Athlete	Group	Body weight	Snatch (kg)				Clean & Jerk (kg)				Total
Rank	Athlete	Group	Body weight	1	2	3	Result	1	2	3	Result	Total
1st place, gold medalist(s)	Albert Linder (KAZ)	A	68.95	143	148	~~151~~	148	180	185	–	185 UR	333 UR
2nd place, silver medalist(s)	Kim Myong-hyok (PRK)	A	68.98	146	151	153	153 UR	~~178~~	178	~~184~~	178	331
3rd place, bronze medalist(s)	Masanori Miyamoto (JPN)	A	68.96	135	140	145	145	170	175	179	179	324
4	O Kang-chol (PRK)	B	68.87	131	138	~~142~~	138	166	173	~~177~~	173	311
5	Lee Sang-yeon (KOR)	A	68.32	142	~~146~~	~~146~~	142	168	~~174~~	~~174~~	168	310
6	Zhou Zhenhua (CHN)	B	68.76	137	142	144	144	165	~~170~~	~~170~~	165	309
7	Mitsunori Konnai (JPN)	A	68.91	~~133~~	133	~~136~~	133	168	172	~~177~~	172	305
8	Jonathan Muñoz (MEX)	A	68.90	131	135	~~139~~	135	168	~~173~~	~~175~~	168	303
9	Ahmet Turan Okyay (TUR)	A	68.90	~~138~~	~~138~~	140	140	160	~~167~~	~~172~~	160	300
10	Petr Petrov (CZE)	A	68.90	131	135	~~137~~	135	~~165~~	165	~~170~~	165	300
11	Serghei Cechir (MDA)	A	68.88	130	134	~~137~~	134	155	~~160~~	~~167~~	155	289
12	Darius Stefan Suiugan (ROU)	B	68.92	125	130	~~133~~	130	155	~~158~~	~~158~~	155	285
13	Szymon Rotnicki (POL)	B	68.95	120	~~125~~	125	125	145	149	~~152~~	149	274
14	Edouard Frève-Guérin (CAN)	B	68.89	116	121	~~125~~	121	148	~~154~~	~~156~~	148	269
15	Rafael Fernandes (BRA)	B	68.13	~~121~~	121	~~125~~	121	146	~~152~~	–	146	267
16	Mathias Vigsø Strøm (DEN)	B	68.70	108	~~112~~	~~112~~	108	128	132	136	136	244
17	Vincentas Skirka (LTU)	B	68.53	107	112	~~115~~	112	127	~~132~~	~~132~~	127	239
18	Joel Law Wei (SGP)	B	68.35	92	97	100	100	123	126	~~130~~	126	226
19	Elie Jr. Perez (PHI)	B	67.46	85	90	93	93	120	~~125~~	125	125	218
20	Chanaka S. Muhandiram (SRI)	B	65.15	~~85~~	85	~~92~~	85	105	112	~~118~~	112	197
	Simon Brandhuber (GER)	A	68.71	132	~~136~~	136	136	~~155~~	~~155~~	~~155~~	–	–
