= Weightlifting at the 2014 Asian Games – Men's 69 kg =

Men's 69 kg at the 2014 Asian Games
- Venue: Moonlight Festival Garden Venue
- Date: 22 September 2014
- Competitors: 23 from 22 nations

Medalists
gold medal	Lin Qingfeng	China
silver medal	Kim Myong-hyok	North Korea
bronze medal	Karrar Mohammed	Iraq

The men's 69 kilograms event at the 2014 Asian Games took place on 22 September 2014 at Moonlight Festival Garden Weightlifting Venue.

== Schedule ==
All times are Korea Standard Time (UTC+09:00)

Date	Time	Event
Monday, 22 September 2014	14:00	Group B
Monday, 22 September 2014	19:00	Group A

== Records ==
Prior to this competition, the existing world, Asian and Games records were as follows.

World Record	Snatch	Georgi Markov (BUL)	165 kg	Sydney, Australia	20 September 2000
World Record	Clean & Jerk	Liao Hui (CHN)	198 kg	Wrocław, Poland	23 October 2013
World Record	Total	Liao Hui (CHN)	358 kg	Wrocław, Poland	23 October 2013
Asian Record	Snatch	Zhang Guozheng (CHN)	160 kg	Athens, Greece	18 August 2004
Asian Record	Clean & Jerk	Liao Hui (CHN)	198 kg	Wrocław, Poland	23 October 2013
Asian Record	Total	Liao Hui (CHN)	358 kg	Wrocław, Poland	23 October 2013
Games Record	Snatch	Wan Jianhui (CHN)	155 kg	Bangkok, Thailand	9 December 1998
Games Record	Clean & Jerk	Kim Hak-bong (KOR)	195 kg	Bangkok, Thailand	9 December 1998
Games Record	Total	Zhang Guozheng (CHN)	345 kg	Busan, South Korea	3 October 2002

== Results ==
Legend

- NM — No mark

Rank	Athlete	Group	Body weight	Snatch (kg)				Clean & Jerk (kg)				Total
Rank	Athlete	Group	Body weight	1	2	3	Result	1	2	3	Result	Total
1st place, gold medalist(s)	Lin Qingfeng (CHN)	A	68.00	150	155	158	158	184	~~200~~	~~200~~	184	342
2nd place, silver medalist(s)	Kim Myong-hyok (PRK)	A	68.66	152	157	160	160	182	~~190~~	~~198~~	182	342
3rd place, bronze medalist(s)	Karrar Mohammed (IRQ)	A	68.91	143	146	148	148	174	~~177~~	177	177	325
4	Deni (INA)	A	68.35	140	146	~~151~~	146	176	~~180~~	~~180~~	176	322
5	Izzat Artykov (KGZ)	A	68.59	135	140	~~145~~	140	170	175	~~178~~	175	315
6	Won Jeong-sik (KOR)	A	68.92	143	~~148~~	~~148~~	143	170	~~183~~	—	170	313
7	Doston Yokubov (UZB)	A	68.58	130	134	138	138	170	174	~~177~~	174	312
8	Masakazu Ioroi (JPN)	A	68.67	135	~~139~~	139	139	165	170	~~174~~	170	309
9	Meretguly Sähetmyradow (TKM)	A	68.65	134	~~138~~	~~139~~	134	160	~~167~~	170	170	304
10	Tairat Bunsuk (THA)	A	68.59	~~133~~	~~133~~	133	133	165	170	~~174~~	170	303
11	Alexandr Kim (KAZ)	B	68.56	130	~~136~~	136	136	155	161	~~166~~	161	297
12	Mohsen Al-Duhaylib (KSA)	B	68.19	127	~~131~~	~~131~~	127	150	~~159~~	~~160~~	150	277
13	Kamal Bahadur Adhikari (NEP)	B	68.56	~~115~~	~~115~~	115	115	150	~~158~~	~~158~~	150	265
14	Nizom Sangov (TJK)	B	68.90	115	122	~~127~~	122	135	140	~~145~~	140	262
15	Batbilegiin Orgilsaikhan (MGL)	B	68.70	112	~~120~~	~~120~~	112	135	~~141~~	141	141	253
16	Abu Sufyan (PAK)	B	66.76	107	110	113	113	130	135	~~140~~	135	248
17	Ali Haidar Al-Fakih (YEM)	B	68.94	90	100	105	105	~~125~~	125	130	130	235
18	Zakaria Hamada (PLE)	B	68.88	92	97	~~105~~	97	120	125	130	130	227
19	Abdulaziz Al-Derbas (KUW)	B	68.99	91	~~100~~	~~100~~	91	110	122	~~130~~	122	213
—	Jaber Behrouzi (IRI)	A	68.78	~~144~~	144	~~149~~	144	~~176~~	~~181~~	~~181~~	—	NM
—	Pan Chien-hung (TPE)	B	68.67	135	~~140~~	140	140	~~170~~	~~170~~	~~170~~	—	NM
—	Chinthana Vidanage (SRI)	B	68.67	122	126	~~128~~	126	~~160~~	~~160~~	~~160~~	—	NM
—	I Ketut Ariana (INA)	A	68.70	~~145~~	~~147~~	~~147~~	—	—	—	—	—	NM

== New records ==
The following records were established during the competition.

Snatch	157	Kim Myong-hyok (PRK)	GR
Snatch	158	Lin Qingfeng (CHN)	GR
Snatch	160	Kim Myong-hyok (PRK)	GR
