= 2016 in weightlifting =

This article lists the main weightlifting events and their results for 2016.

== 2016 Summer Olympics (IWF) ==
- March 18 – 20: 2016 IWF Grand Prix #1 (Russian Federation President's Cup) and Olympic Qualification Event in (Russia) Kazan
  - Men's 94 kg winner: (Russia) Adam Maligov
  - Men's 105 kg winner: (Poland) Jaroslaw Pawel Samoraj
  - Men's +105 kg winner: (Armenia) Ruben Aleksanyan
  - Women's 75 kg winner: (Canada) Johanie Filiatreault
  - Women's +75 kg winner: (Armenia) Hripsime Khurshudyan
- April 7 – 10: Aquece Rio Weightlifting 2016 (South American Weightlifting Championship) in Rio de Janeiro (Olympic Test Event)
  - Colombia won the gold medal tally. Colombia and Brazil won 10 overall medals each.
- May 30 – June 3: 2016 IWF Grand Prix #2 (International Fajr Cup) and Olympic Qualification Event in (Iran) Tehran (debut event)
  - Men's 85 kg winner: (Iran) Kianoush Rostami
  - Men's 94 kg winner: (Iran) Sohrab Moradi
  - Men's 105 kg winner: (Iran) Mohammad Reza Barari
  - Men's +105 kg winner: (Iran) Behdad Salimikordasiabi
- August 6 – 16: 2016 Summer Olympics in (Brazil) Rio de Janeiro at the Riocentro
  - Men
  - Men's 56 kg: (gold) (China) Long Qingquan (WR & OR); (silver) (North Korea) Om Yun-chol; (bronze) (Thailand) Sinphet Kruaithong
  - Men's 62 kg: (gold) (Colombia) Óscar Figueroa; (silver) (Indonesia) Eko Yuli Irawan; (bronze) (Kazakhstan) Farkhad Kharki
  - Men's 69 kg: (gold) (China) Shi Zhiyong; (silver) (Turkey) Daniyar Ismayilov; (bronze) (Colombia) Luis Javier Mosquera
    - Note: (Kyrgyzstan) Izzat Artykov was disqualified from the 69 kg event, due to doping.
  - Men's 77 kg: (gold) (Kazakhstan) Nijat Rahimov (WR); (silver) (China) Lü Xiaojun; (bronze) (Egypt) Mohamed Ihab
  - Men's 85 kg: (gold) (Iran) Kianoush Rostami (WR); (silver) (China) Tian Tao; (bronze) (Romania) Gabriel Sîncrăian
  - Men's 94 kg: (gold) (Iran) Sohrab Moradi; (silver) (Belarus) Vadzim Straltsou; (bronze) (Lithuania) Aurimas Didžbalis
  - Men's 105 kg: (gold) (Uzbekistan) Ruslan Nurudinov (OR); (silver) (Armenia) Simon Martirosyan; (bronze) (Kazakhstan) Aleksandr Zaychikov
  - Men's +105 kg: (gold) (Georgia (country)) Lasha Talakhadze (WR & OR); (silver) (Armenia) Gor Minasyan; (bronze) (Georgia (country)) Irakli Turmanidze
  - Women
  - Women's 48 kg: (gold) (Thailand) Sopita Tanasan; (silver) (Indonesia) Sri Wahyuni Agustiani; (bronze) (Japan) Hiromi Miyake
  - Women's 53 kg: (gold) (Chinese Taipei) Hsu Shu-ching; (silver) (Philippines) Hidilyn Diaz; (bronze) (South Korea) Yoon Jin-hee
  - Women's 58 kg: (gold) (Thailand) Sukanya Srisurat (OR); (silver) (Thailand) Pimsiri Sirikaew; (bronze) (Chinese Taipei) Kuo Hsing-chun
  - Women's 63 kg: (gold) (China) Deng Wei (WR & OR); (silver) (North Korea) Choe Hyo-sim; (bronze) (Kazakhstan) Karina Goricheva
  - Women's 69 kg: (gold) (China) Xiang Yanmei; (silver) (Kazakhstan) Zhazira Zhapparkul; (bronze) (Egypt) Sara Ahmed
  - Women's 75 kg: (gold) (North Korea) Rim Jong-sim; (silver) (Belarus) Darya Naumava; (bronze) (Spain) Lydia Valentín
  - Women's +75 kg: (gold) (China) Meng Suping; (silver) (North Korea) Kim Kuk-hyang; (bronze) (United States) Sarah Robles

== World weightlifting championships ==
- June 24 – July 2: 2016 IWF Junior World Weightlifting Championships in (Georgia (country)) Tbilisi
  - China won both the gold and overall medal tallies.
- October 20 – 25: 2016 IWF Youth World Weightlifting Championships in (Malaysia) Penang
  - China won both the gold and overall medal tallies.
- November 13 – 17: 2016 FISU World University Weightlifting Championships in Mérida, Yucatán
  - China won the gold medal tally. Mexico and Chinese Taipei won 8 overall medals each.

== Continental & regional weightlifting championships ==
- April 8 – 16: 2016 European Weightlifting Championships in (Norway) Førde
  - Armenia and Turkey won 3 gold medals each. Romania won the overall medal tally.
- April 22 – 30: 2016 Asian Weightlifting Championships in (Uzbekistan) Tashkent
  - China won both the gold and overall medal tallies.
- April 23 – 30: 2016 Pan American Junior Weightlifting Championships in (El Salvador) San Salvador
  - Colombia won both the gold and overall medal tallies.
- May 7 – 13: 2016 African Weightlifting Championships in (Cameroon) Yaoundé
  - Nigeria and Tunisia won 4 gold medals each. Tunisia won the overall medal tally.
- May 23 – 28: 2016 Oceania Weightlifting Championships in Suva
  - Australia and Fiji won 3 gold medals each. Australia won the overall medal tally.
- June 4 – 11: 2016 Pan American Weightlifting Championships in Cartagena, Colombia
  - Colombia won both the gold and overall medal tallies.
- September 10 – 17: 2016 European Youth Weightlifting Championships in (Poland) Nowy Tomyśl
  - Armenia, Bulgaria, Romania, and Ukraine won 2 gold medals each. Russia won the overall medal tally.
- October 25 – 29: 2016 Commonwealth Weightlifting Championships in Penang
  - India won the gold medal tally. Malaysia won the overall medal tally.
- November 8 – 16: 2016 Asian Youth & Junior Weightlifting Championships in (Japan) Tokyo
  - Junior: Thailand won both the gold and overall medal tallies.
  - Youth: Iran won the gold medal tally. Iran, India, and Chinese Taipei won 7 overall medals each.
- December 2 – 10: 2016 European Junior Weightlifting Championships in (Israel) Eilat
  - Ukraine won both the gold and overall medal tallies.
- December 8 – 15: 2016 African Junior and Youth Weightlifting Championships in Cairo
  - Junior: Egypt won both the gold and overall medal tallies.
  - Youth: Egypt won both the gold and overall medal tallies.

== 2016 IPC Powerlifting World Cup ==
- January 21 – 23: PWC #1 in Rio de Janeiro (Paralympic Test Event)
  - Brazil won both the gold and overall medal tallies.
- February 15 – 19: PWC #2 in (United Arab Emirates) Dubai
  - Egypt won both the gold and overall medal tallies.
- February 24 – 28: PWC #3 (final) in (Malaysia) Kuala Lumpur
  - China won both the gold and overall medal tallies.
