= 2015 World Weightlifting Championships – Men's 69 kg =

The men's 69 kilograms event at the 2015 World Weightlifting Championships was held on 22 and 23 November 2015 in Houston, United States.

== Schedule ==
Date	Time	Event
22 November 2015	09:00	Group D
22 November 2015	19:25	Group C
22 November 2015	21:25	Group B
23 November 2015	17:25	Group A

== Medalists ==
Event	Gold		Silver		Bronze	
Snatch	Daniyar İsmayilov (TUR)	160 kg	Oleg Chen (RUS)	160 kg	Shi Zhiyong (CHN)	158 kg
Clean & Jerk	Shi Zhiyong (CHN)	190 kg	Kim Myong-hyok (PRK)	187 kg	Bredni Roque (MEX)	186 kg
Total	Shi Zhiyong (CHN)	348 kg	Oleg Chen (RUS)	344 kg	Daniyar İsmayilov (TUR)	343 kg

== Records ==
Prior to this competition, the existing world records were as follows.

World record	Snatch	Liao Hui (CHN)	166 kg	Almaty, Kazakhstan	10 November 2014
World record	Clean & Jerk	Liao Hui (CHN)	198 kg	Wrocław, Poland	23 October 2013
World record	Total	Liao Hui (CHN)	359 kg	Almaty, Kazakhstan	10 November 2014

== Results ==
Rank	Athlete	Group	Body weight	Snatch (kg)				Clean & Jerk (kg)				Total
Rank	Athlete	Group	Body weight	1	2	3	Rank	1	2	3	Rank	Total
1st place, gold medalist(s)	Shi Zhiyong (CHN)	A	68.96	155	158	~~161~~	3rd place, bronze medalist(s)	187	~~190~~	190	1st place, gold medalist(s)	348
2nd place, silver medalist(s)	Oleg Chen (RUS)	A	68.82	~~155~~	155	160	2nd place, silver medalist(s)	177	184	~~187~~	4	344
3rd place, bronze medalist(s)	Daniyar İsmayilov (TUR)	A	68.61	155	160	~~163~~	1st place, gold medalist(s)	176	183	~~188~~	6	343
4	Kim Myong-hyok (PRK)	A	68.83	155	~~160~~	~~161~~	4	183	187	~~189~~	2nd place, silver medalist(s)	342
5	Karem Ben Hnia (TUN)	A	68.54	146	~~149~~	150	5	176	~~181~~	183	5	333
6	Bredni Roque (MEX)	A	68.85	140	145	~~148~~	9	177	182	186	3rd place, bronze medalist(s)	331
7	Briken Calja (ALB)	A	68.93	~~143~~	~~143~~	143	12	177	183	~~187~~	7	326
8	Bernardin Matam (FRA)	A	68.67	143	147	~~149~~	6	175	~~180~~	~~180~~	13	322
9	Artsiom Shahau (BLR)	A	68.94	~~142~~	142	~~147~~	13	170	175	180	8	322
10	I Ketut Ariana (INA)	B	68.28	~~142~~	142	146	8	172	175	~~178~~	12	321
11	Vanik Avetisyan (ARM)	A	68.89	136	140	~~142~~	19	177	~~182~~	~~182~~	9	317
12	Alex Lee (USA)	B	68.89	133	137	140	20	171	~~176~~	176	10	316
13	Farkhad Kharki (KAZ)	B	66.13	130	135	138	22	~~170~~	170	175	11	313
14	Serghei Cechir (MDA)	B	68.80	138	143	~~147~~	10	170	~~176~~	~~176~~	19	313
15	Edwin Mosquera (COL)	B	68.82	137	141	143	11	165	~~170~~	170	20	313
16	Deni (INA)	B	67.60	135	140	~~143~~	17	~~171~~	172	~~175~~	15	312
17	Tairat Bunsuk (THA)	B	68.73	~~136~~	136	~~141~~	25	~~170~~	170	174	14	310
18	David Sánchez (ESP)	C	68.96	135	~~140~~	140	21	165	170	~~174~~	21	310
19	Pan Chien-hung (TPE)	C	68.84	130	135	~~140~~	28	161	166	171	17	306
20	Simon Brandhuber (GER)	C	68.99	134	138	141	15	161	~~165~~	165	30	306
21	Robert Joachim (GER)	C	68.84	133	136	138	23	163	~~167~~	167	26	305
22	Mohsen Al-Duhaylib (KSA)	D	68.85	130	134	136	26	160	~~168~~	169	22	305
23	Masakazu Ioroi (JPN)	C	68.64	132	~~136~~	136	24	~~163~~	163	166	29	302
24	Ahmet Okyay (TUR)	C	62.58	135	140	~~142~~	16	161	~~165~~	~~165~~	32	301
25	Mahmoud Al-Humayd (KSA)	D	67.28	130	~~134~~	~~136~~	33	158	165	170	18	300
26	Shota Mishvelidze (GEO)	C	67.95	134	138	140	18	160	~~165~~	~~165~~	33	300
27	Erik Herrera (ECU)	D	68.51	125	129	~~132~~	39	163	168	171	16	300
28	Jonathan Muñoz (MEX)	D	68.52	126	131	133	30	162	167	~~172~~	24	300
29	Edwar Vásquez (VEN)	C	67.95	~~130~~	~~130~~	130	34	161	165	168	23	298
30	Clarence Cummings (USA)	C	68.11	123	128	132	31	166	~~174~~	~~174~~	28	298
31	Yann Aucouturier (FRA)	C	68.67	~~130~~	~~130~~	130	35	162	167	~~171~~	25	297
32	Takehiro Kasai (JPN)	D	68.93	125	~~130~~	130	37	160	~~167~~	167	27	297
33	Víctor Castro (ESP)	D	68.65	130	135	~~138~~	27	155	~~160~~	160	35	295
34	Petr Petrov (CZE)	C	68.69	~~128~~	128	132	32	162	~~169~~	~~170~~	31	294
35	Israel José Rubio (VEN)	C	68.51	~~133~~	133	~~137~~	29	~~160~~	~~160~~	160	34	293
36	Papul Changmai (IND)	D	68.88	120	~~125~~	~~125~~	43	145	150	155	36	275
37	Stevick Patris (PLW)	D	68.64	110	115	120	42	143	148	152	37	272
38	Manuel Minginfel (FSM)	D	68.68	112	117	122	41	150	~~160~~	~~160~~	38	272
39	Batbilegiin Orgilsaikhan (MGL)	D	68.71	~~116~~	116	~~119~~	44	~~140~~	140	~~143~~	39	256
—	Jaber Behrouzi (IRI)	B	68.74	141	147	~~148~~	7	~~173~~	~~173~~	~~174~~	—	—
—	Won Jeong-sik (KOR)	B	68.49	141	~~146~~	~~146~~	14	~~171~~	~~171~~	~~171~~	—	—
—	Rahmatjan Sultanow (TKM)	B	68.78	125	~~130~~	130	36	~~171~~	~~171~~	~~171~~	—	—
—	Francis Luna-Grenier (CAN)	D	68.94	~~130~~	~~130~~	130	38	~~165~~	~~165~~	~~165~~	—	—
—	Indika Dissanayake (SRI)	D	68.93	128	~~133~~	~~133~~	40	~~158~~	~~158~~	~~158~~	—	—
—	Arbnor Krasniqi (KOS)	D	68.58	100	~~104~~	~~104~~	45	~~139~~	—	—	—	—
DQ	Firidun Guliyev (AZE)	A	68.59	~~142~~	~~142~~	143	—	185	~~188~~	188	—	341
