= 2019 World Weightlifting Championships – Men's 73 kg =

The men's 73 kg competition at the 2019 World Weightlifting Championships was held on 21 September 2019.

== Schedule ==
Date	Time	Event
21 September 2019	10:00	Group C
21 September 2019	14:25	Group B
21 September 2019	20:25	Group A

== Medalists ==
Event	Gold		Silver		Bronze	
Snatch	Shi Zhiyong (CHN)	166 kg	Bozhidar Andreev (BUL)	157 kg	Briken Calja (ALB)	156 kg
Clean & Jerk	Shi Zhiyong (CHN)	197 kg	O Kang-chol (PRK)	193 kg	Bozhidar Andreev (BUL)	189 kg
Total	Shi Zhiyong (CHN)	363 kg	O Kang-chol (PRK)	347 kg	Bozhidar Andreev (BUL)	346 kg

== Records ==
Prior to this competition, the existing world records were as follows.

World Record	Snatch	Shi Zhiyong (CHN)	168 kg	Ningbo, China	22 April 2019
World Record	Clean & Jerk	Shi Zhiyong (CHN)	196 kg	Ashgabat, Turkmenistan	4 November 2018
World Record	Total	Shi Zhiyong (CHN)	362 kg	Ningbo, China	21 April 2019

== Results ==
Rank	Athlete	Group	Snatch (kg)				Clean & Jerk (kg)				Total
Rank	Athlete	Group	1	2	3	Rank	1	2	3	Rank	Total
1st place, gold medalist(s)	Shi Zhiyong (CHN)	A	160	163	166	1st place, gold medalist(s)	190	197 WR	—	1st place, gold medalist(s)	363 WR
2nd place, silver medalist(s)	O Kang-chol (PRK)	A	150	154	~~156~~	5	185	191	193	2nd place, silver medalist(s)	347
3rd place, bronze medalist(s)	Bozhidar Andreev (BUL)	A	149	154	157	2nd place, silver medalist(s)	185	189	~~192~~	3rd place, bronze medalist(s)	346
4	Vadzim Likharad (BLR)	A	154	~~157~~	~~158~~	4	184	~~189~~	~~189~~	7	338
5	Briken Calja (ALB)	A	151	156	—	3rd place, bronze medalist(s)	181	~~190~~	~~190~~	13	337
6	Julio Mayora (VEN)	A	147	152	~~157~~	8	185	~~191~~	~~192~~	6	337
7	Bak Joo-hyo (KOR)	A	147	151	~~155~~	9	~~186~~	186	~~191~~	5	337
8	Won Jeong-sik (KOR)	A	146	150	153	7	~~183~~	183	~~188~~	11	336
9	Clarence Cummings (USA)	A	145	150	~~155~~	10	~~183~~	183	~~191~~	10	333
10	Yuan Chengfei (CHN)	A	146	~~151~~	~~155~~	13	181	~~185~~	187	4	333
11	David Sánchez (ESP)	B	140	~~145~~	145	16	175	180	183	8	328
12	Masanori Miyamoto (JPN)	B	140	145	~~148~~	14	175	180	183	9	328
13	Sergey Petrov (RUS)	B	144	150	153	6	174	~~179~~	~~179~~	17	327
14	Max Lang (GER)	B	143	~~147~~	147	12	175	~~180~~	180	15	327
15	Triyatno (INA)	B	138	143	145	15	177	181	~~185~~	12	326
16	Doston Yokubov (UZB)	B	136	141	~~146~~	19	~~180~~	180	~~187~~	14	321
17	Marin Robu (MDA)	B	143	149	~~152~~	11	170	~~178~~	~~178~~	21	319
18	Rahmat Erwin Abdullah (INA)	B	138	142	144	17	168	172	174	18	318
19	Maksat Meredow (TKM)	B	~~135~~	137	~~142~~	22	172	178	~~182~~	16	315
20	Archil Malakmadze (GEO)	B	137	142	~~145~~	18	163	168	~~172~~	23	310
21	Kakhi Asanidze (GEO)	B	133	137	140	21	162	167	~~171~~	24	307
22	Kevin Sandoval (COL)	B	136	140	~~144~~	20	162	167	~~170~~	25	307
23	Masakazu Ioroi (JPN)	B	135	~~140~~	~~140~~	24	160	170	~~177~~	22	305
24	Jorge Sánchez (PUR)	C	128	133	~~136~~	27	168	171	~~175~~	19	304
25	Achinta Sheuli (IND)	C	130	~~135~~	135	23	162	166	~~170~~	26	301
26	Tim Kring (DEN)	B	~~135~~	135	~~139~~	25	165	~~169~~	~~170~~	27	300
27	Indika Dissanayake (SRI)	C	~~131~~	131	134	26	160	164	~~168~~	28	298
28	Sudesh Peiris (SRI)	C	~~130~~	130	~~134~~	29	160	~~165~~	—	30	290
29	Mahmoud Al-Humayd (KSA)	C	125	130	~~135~~	28	150	160	~~169~~	31	290
30	Taretiita Tabaroua (KIR)	C	120	~~124~~	124	31	~~158~~	158	~~162~~	32	282
31	Brandon Wakeling (AUS)	C	115	119	~~122~~	34	154	158	162	29	281
32	Jonathan Chin (GBR)	C	116	120	124	30	147	~~152~~	~~154~~	35	271
33	Larko Doguape (NRU)	C	116	121	~~124~~	32	145	~~150~~	150	34	271
34	Jeffrey Garcia (PHI)	C	120	~~125~~	~~125~~	33	~~150~~	150	~~160~~	33	270
35	Einar Jónsson (ISL)	C	113	~~116~~	~~117~~	35	140	~~145~~	—	36	253
—	Erry Hidayat (MAS)	C	~~135~~	~~135~~	~~135~~	—	163	168	170	20	—
—	Karem Ben Hnia (TUN)	A	—	—	—	—	—	—	—	—	—
—	Gareth Evans (GBR)	C	—	—	—	—	—	—	—	—	—

== New records ==
Clean & Jerk	197 kg	Shi Zhiyong (CHN)	WR
Total	363 kg	Shi Zhiyong (CHN)	WR
