= Weightlifting at the 2016 Summer Olympics – Men's 69 kg =

Men's 69 kg at the Games of the XXXI Olympiad
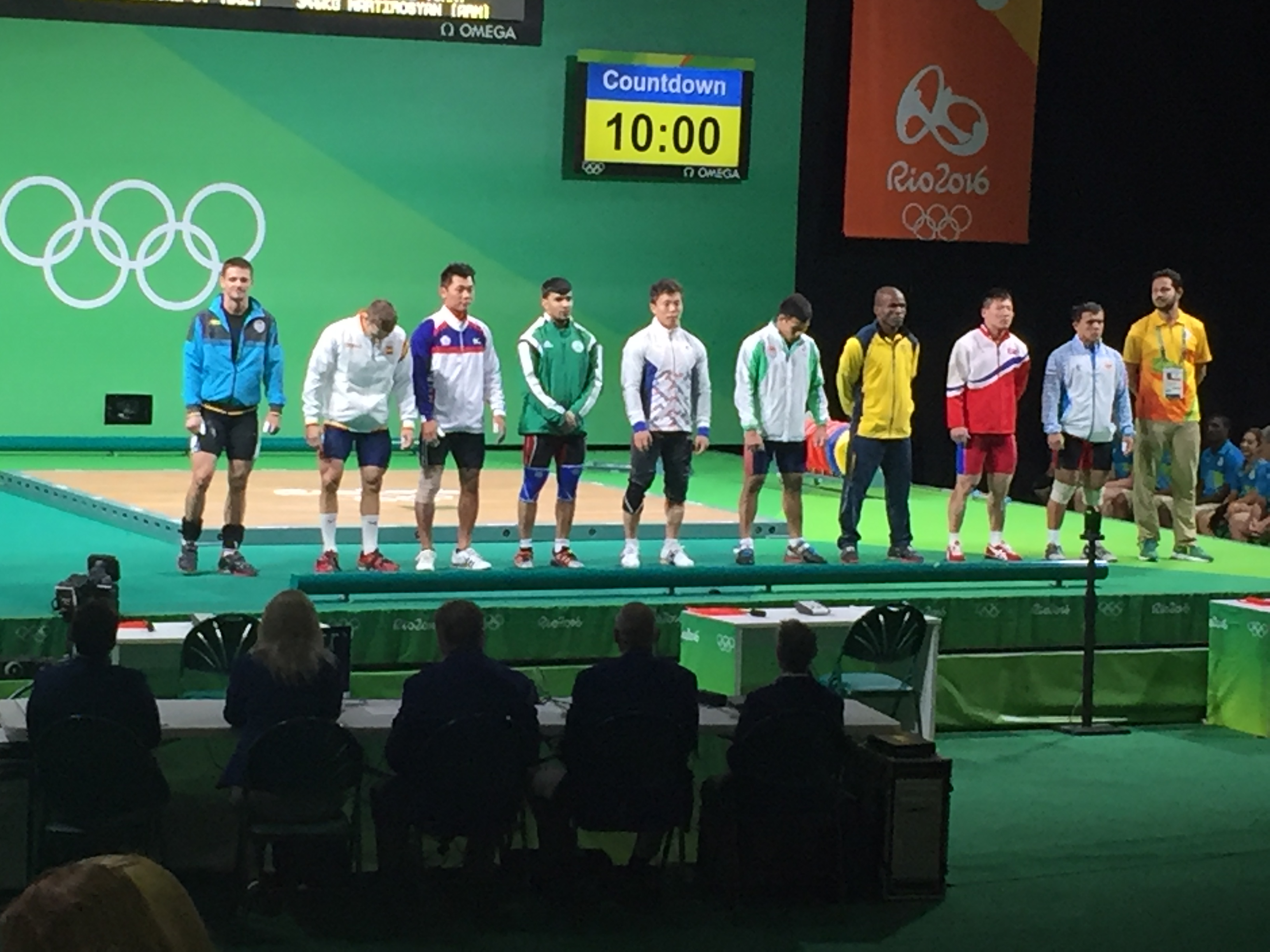
- Competitors of group B
- Venue: Riocentro
- Date: 9 August 2016
- Competitors: 21 from 19 nations
- Winning total: 352 kg

Medalists
1st place, gold medalist(s)		Shi Zhiyong	China
2nd place, silver medalist(s)		Daniyar İsmayilov	Turkey
3rd place, bronze medalist(s)		Luis Javier Mosquera	Colombia

The Men's 69 kg weightlifting competitions at the 2016 Summer Olympics in Rio de Janeiro took place on 9 August at the Pavilion 2 of Riocentro.

== Schedule ==
All times are Time in Brazil (UTC-03:00)

Date	Time	Event
9 August 2016	10:00	Group B
9 August 2016	19:00	Group A

== Records ==
Prior to this competition, the existing world and Olympic records were as follows.

World record	Snatch	Liao Hui (CHN)	166 kg	Almaty, Kazakhstan	10 November 2014
World record	Clean & Jerk	Liao Hui (CHN)	198 kg	Wrocław, Poland	23 October 2013
World record	Total	Liao Hui (CHN)	359 kg	Almaty, Kazakhstan	10 November 2014
Olympic record	Snatch	Georgi Markov (BUL)	165 kg	Sydney, Australia	20 September 2000
Olympic record	Clean & Jerk	Galabin Boevski (BUL)	196 kg	Sydney, Australia	20 September 2000
Olympic record	Total	Galabin Boevski (BUL)	357 kg	Sydney, Australia	20 September 2000

== Results ==
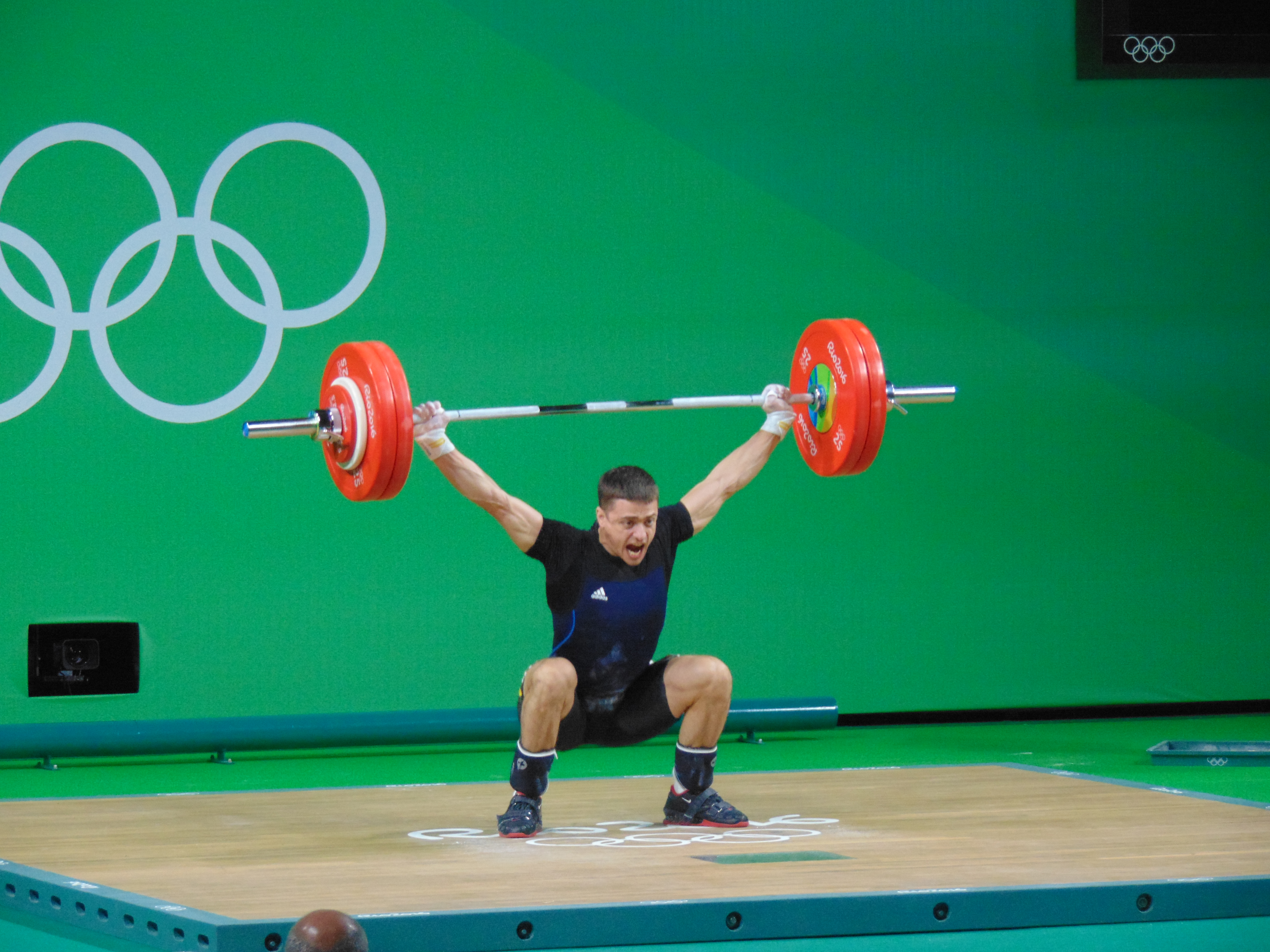
Serghei Cechir, winner of group B, finishing 6th

Rank	Athlete	Group	Body weight	Snatch (kg)				Clean & Jerk (kg)				Total
Rank	Athlete	Group	Body weight	1	2	3	Result	1	2	3	Result	Total
1st place, gold medalist(s)	Shi Zhiyong (CHN)	A	68.72	156	160	162	162	188	190	~~198~~	190	352
2nd place, silver medalist(s)	Daniyar İsmayilov (TUR)	A	68.59	156	160	163	163	181	185	188	188	351
3rd place, bronze medalist(s)	Luis Javier Mosquera (COL)	A	68.54	~~150~~	150	155	155	183	~~189~~	~~190~~	183	338
4	Bredni Roque (MEX)	A	68.63	~~145~~	~~145~~	145	145	181	~~187~~	~~187~~	181	326
5	Briken Calja (ALB)	A	68.84	145	~~151~~	~~151~~	145	175	181	~~184~~	181	326
6	Serghei Cechir (MDA)	B	68.75	140	144	~~147~~	144	170	175	178	178	322
7	Bernardin Matam (FRA)	A	68.71	140	~~144~~	~~144~~	140	175	180	~~182~~	180	320
8	Won Jeong-sik (KOR)	B	68.95	~~143~~	143	~~146~~	143	172	177	~~180~~	177	320
9	Triyatno (INA)	A	68.60	~~142~~	142	~~147~~	142	175	~~182~~	~~182~~	175	317
10	David Sánchez (ESP)	B	68.61	137	142	~~145~~	142	170	175	~~177~~	175	317
11	Tairat Bunsuk (THA)	B	68.65	137	~~141~~	~~141~~	137	175	179	~~181~~	179	316
12	Mohd Hafifi Mansor (MAS)	A	68.71	140	~~143~~	~~144~~	140	176	~~181~~	~~182~~	176	316
13	Kwon Yong-gwang (PRK)	B	68.36	137	~~142~~	~~142~~	137	168	172	176	176	313
14	Doston Yokubov (UZB)	B	68.95	133	137	~~140~~	137	172	176	~~181~~	176	313
15	Edwin Mosquera (COL)	B	68.69	140	~~144~~	~~144~~	140	165	170	~~175~~	170	310
16	Mohsen Al-Duhaylib (KSA)	B	68.96	128	135	~~137~~	135	162	~~171~~	~~171~~	162	297
17	Pan Chien-hung (TPE)	B	68.79	130	~~136~~	136	136	~~160~~	~~160~~	160	160	296
–	Kim Myong-hyok (PRK)	A	68.87	~~157~~	157	~~161~~	157	~~188~~	~~188~~	~~196~~	DNF	DNF
–	Karem Ben Hnia (TUN)	A	68.87	147	~~150~~	~~150~~	147	~~177~~	~~177~~	~~177~~	DNF	DNF
–	I Ketut Ariana (INA)	A	68.75	~~145~~	~~145~~	~~145~~	DNF	—	—	—	—	DNF
DSQ ^{1}	Izzat Artykov (KGZ)	A	68.68	146	151	~~155~~	151	181	188	~~196~~	188	339

^{1} Artykov originally won the bronze medal, but was disqualified after he tested positive for strychnine.
