= 2013 Asian Weightlifting Championships =

International weightlifting competition

2013 Asian Championships
- Host city: Astana, Kazakhstan
- Dates: 21–26 June
- Main venue: Saryarka Sports Center

The 2013 Asian Weightlifting Championships was held in Astana, Kazakhstan from June 21–26, 2013. It was the 44th men's and 25th women's championship.

== Medal summary ==
=== Men ===
Event	Gold		Silver		Bronze	
56 kg
Snatch	Om Yun-chol; North Korea	126 kg	Thạch Kim Tuấn; Vietnam	125 kg	Yang Chin-yi; Chinese Taipei	121 kg
Clean & Jerk	Om Yun-chol; North Korea	160 kg	Thạch Kim Tuấn; Vietnam	156 kg	Trần Lê Quốc Toàn; Vietnam	155 kg
Total	Om Yun-chol; North Korea	286 kg	Thạch Kim Tuấn; Vietnam	281 kg	Trần Lê Quốc Toàn; Vietnam	275 kg
62 kg
Snatch	Kim Un-guk; North Korea	145 kg	Huang Minhao; China	140 kg	Farkhad Kharki; Kazakhstan	138 kg
Clean & Jerk	Kim Un-guk; North Korea	170 kg	Li Chunsheng; China	166 kg	Farkhad Kharki; Kazakhstan	165 kg
Total	Kim Un-guk; North Korea	315 kg	Farkhad Kharki; Kazakhstan	303 kg	Huang Minhao; China	298 kg
69 kg
Snatch	Jaber Behrouzi; Iran	147 kg	Liang Chenxi; China	146 kg	I Ketut Ariana; Indonesia	140 kg
Clean & Jerk	Kim Myong-hyok; North Korea	178 kg	Jaber Behrouzi; Iran	176 kg	Pan Chien-hung; Chinese Taipei	173 kg
Total	Jaber Behrouzi; Iran	323 kg	I Ketut Ariana; Indonesia	310 kg	Pan Chien-hung; Chinese Taipei	303 kg
77 kg
Snatch	Kim Kwang-song; North Korea	164 kg	Rasoul Taghian; Iran	163 kg	Zhong Guoshun; China	160 kg
Clean & Jerk	Rasoul Taghian; Iran	203 kg	Zhong Guoshun; China	196 kg	Kim Kwang-song; North Korea	191 kg
Total	Rasoul Taghian; Iran	366 kg	Zhong Guoshun; China	356 kg	Kim Kwang-song; North Korea	355 kg
85 kg
Snatch	Zhuang Gongping; China	155 kg	Yu Dong-ju; South Korea	155 kg	Yerbol Meirmanov; Kazakhstan	155 kg
Clean & Jerk	Yu Dong-ju; South Korea	185 kg	Imam Jamaludin; Indonesia	180 kg	Hoàng Tấn Tài; Vietnam	180 kg
Total	Yu Dong-ju; South Korea	340 kg	Hoàng Tấn Tài; Vietnam	326 kg	Imam Jamaludin; Indonesia	325 kg
94 kg
Snatch	Zhang Shengguo; China	168 kg	Xie Wei; China	155 kg	Trần Văn Hóa; Vietnam	155 kg
Clean & Jerk	Zhang Shengguo; China	206 kg	Xie Wei; China	202 kg	Chandrakant Mali; India	180 kg
Total	Zhang Shengguo; China	374 kg	Xie Wei; China	357 kg	Trần Văn Hóa; Vietnam	335 kg
105 kg
Snatch	Ruslan Nurudinov; Uzbekistan	190 kg	Mohsen Bahramzadeh; Iran	185 kg	Kia Ghadami; Iran	174 kg
Clean & Jerk	Ruslan Nurudinov; Uzbekistan	230 kg	Kia Ghadami; Iran	205 kg	Mohsen Bahramzadeh; Iran	205 kg
Total	Ruslan Nurudinov; Uzbekistan	420 kg	Mohsen Bahramzadeh; Iran	390 kg	Kia Ghadami; Iran	379 kg
+105 kg
Snatch	Rashid Sharifi; Iran	191 kg	Bahador Molaei; Iran	186 kg	Ibragim Bersanov; Kazakhstan	185 kg
Clean & Jerk	Chen Shih-chieh; Chinese Taipei	233 kg	Rashid Sharifi; Iran	226 kg	Ibragim Bersanov; Kazakhstan	217 kg
Total	Rashid Sharifi; Iran	417 kg	Chen Shih-chieh; Chinese Taipei	413 kg	Ibragim Bersanov; Kazakhstan	402 kg

=== Women ===
Event	Gold		Silver		Bronze	
48 kg
Snatch	Ryang Chun-hwa; North Korea	80 kg	Feng Linmei; China	79 kg	Đỗ Thị Thu Hoài; Vietnam	78 kg
Clean & Jerk	Ryang Chun-hwa; North Korea	110 kg	Sri Wahyuni Agustiani; Indonesia	100 kg	Đỗ Thị Thu Hoài; Vietnam	96 kg
Total	Ryang Chun-hwa; North Korea	190 kg	Sri Wahyuni Agustiani; Indonesia	176 kg	Đỗ Thị Thu Hoài; Vietnam	174 kg
53 kg
Snatch	Guo Jinyan; China	90 kg	Margarita Yelisseyeva; Kazakhstan	85 kg	Dewi Safitri; Indonesia	80 kg
Clean & Jerk	Guo Jinyan; China	112 kg	Nguyễn Thị Thúy; Vietnam	107 kg	Marina Sisoeva; Uzbekistan	106 kg
Total	Guo Jinyan; China	202 kg	Nguyễn Thị Thúy; Vietnam	187 kg	Marina Sisoeva; Uzbekistan	186 kg
58 kg
Snatch	Ri Jong-hwa; North Korea	105 kg	Jong Chun-mi; North Korea	104 kg	Kuo Hsing-chun; Chinese Taipei	102 kg
Clean & Jerk	Kuo Hsing-chun; Chinese Taipei	134 kg	Ri Jong-hwa; North Korea	130 kg	Jong Chun-mi; North Korea	130 kg
Total	Kuo Hsing-chun; Chinese Taipei	236 kg	Ri Jong-hwa; North Korea	235 kg	Jong Chun-mi; North Korea	234 kg
63 kg
Snatch	Lin Tzu-chi; Chinese Taipei	110 kg	Karina Goricheva; Kazakhstan	104 kg	Jo Pok-hyang; North Korea	103 kg
Clean & Jerk	Lin Tzu-chi; Chinese Taipei	133 kg	Jo Pok-hyang; North Korea	133 kg	Wu Linying; China	122 kg
Total	Lin Tzu-chi; Chinese Taipei	243 kg	Jo Pok-hyang; North Korea	236 kg	Wu Linying; China	222 kg
69 kg
Snatch	Ryo Un-hui; North Korea	118 kg	Rim Jong-sim; North Korea	112 kg	Hung Wan-ting; Chinese Taipei	101 kg
Clean & Jerk	Ryo Un-hui; North Korea	145 kg	Rim Jong-sim; North Korea	143 kg	Yu Ying; China	128 kg
Total	Ryo Un-hui; North Korea	263 kg	Rim Jong-sim; North Korea	255 kg	Yu Ying; China	228 kg
75 kg
Snatch	Anna Nurmukhambetova; Kazakhstan	114 kg	Lai Hsiang-ting; Chinese Taipei	105 kg	Lin Tingting; China	104 kg
Clean & Jerk	Anna Nurmukhambetova; Kazakhstan	135 kg	Wang Ya-jhen; Chinese Taipei	128 kg	Lin Tingting; China	127 kg
Total	Anna Nurmukhambetova; Kazakhstan	249 kg	Wang Ya-jhen; Chinese Taipei	231 kg	Lin Tingting; China	231 kg
+75 kg
Snatch	Nguyễn Thị Kim Vân; Vietnam	106 kg	Yao Chi-ling; Chinese Taipei	105 kg	Praeonapa Khenjantuek; Thailand	101 kg
Clean & Jerk	Liu Yun-chien; Chinese Taipei	142 kg	Praeonapa Khenjantuek; Thailand	141 kg	Nguyễn Thị Kim Vân; Vietnam	136 kg
Total	Nguyễn Thị Kim Vân; Vietnam	242 kg	Praeonapa Khenjantuek; Thailand	242 kg	Yao Chi-ling; Chinese Taipei	239 kg

== Medal table ==
Ranking by Big (Total result) medals

Rank	Nation	Gold	Silver	Bronze	Total
1	North Korea	4	3	2	9
2	Iran	3	1	1	5
3	China	2	2	4	8
4	Chinese Taipei	2	2	2	6
5	Vietnam	1	3	3	7
6	Kazakhstan	1	1	1	3
7	Uzbekistan	1	0	1	2
8	South Korea	1	0	0	1
9	Indonesia	0	2	1	3
10	Thailand	0	1	0	1
Totals (10 entries)		15	15	15	45

Ranking by all medals: Big (Total result) and Small (Snatch and Clean & Jerk)

Rank	Nation	Gold	Silver	Bronze	Total
1	North Korea	15	8	5	28
2	China	7	9	9	25
3	Chinese Taipei	7	5	6	18
4	Iran	6	7	3	16
5	Kazakhstan	3	3	6	12
6	Uzbekistan	3	0	2	5
7	Vietnam	2	6	9	17
8	South Korea	2	1	0	3
9	Indonesia	0	4	3	7
10	Thailand	0	2	1	3
11	India	0	0	1	1
Totals (11 entries)		45	45	45	135

== Team ranking ==
=== Men ===
Rank	Team	Points
1	India	472
2	Chinese Taipei	470
3	Vietnam	454
4	Kuwait	441
5	China	423
6	Iran	412

=== Women ===
Rank	Team	Points
1	Chinese Taipei	513
2	North Korea	465
3	Vietnam	464
4	China	380
5	Indonesia	368
6	Kazakhstan	364

== Participating nations ==
136 athletes from 18 nations competed.

- China (13)
- Chinese Taipei (15)
- India (15)
- Indonesia (11)
- Iran (8)
- Iraq (2)
- Japan (4)
- Kazakhstan (15)
- Kuwait (8)
- Kyrgyzstan (2)
- Macau (2)
- North Korea (11)
- Qatar (1)
- South Korea (3)
- Tajikistan (3)
- Thailand (5)
- Uzbekistan (4)
- Vietnam (14)
