= Weightlifting at the 2018 Asian Games – Men's 69 kg =

Men's 69 kg at the 2018 Asian Games
- Venue: Jakarta International Expo
- Date: 22 August 2018
- Competitors: 18 from 13 nations

Medalists
gold medal	O Kang-chol	North Korea
silver medal	Doston Yokubov	Uzbekistan
bronze medal	Izzat Artykov	Kyrgyzstan

The Men's 69 kilograms event at the 2018 Asian Games took place on 22 August 2018 at the Jakarta International Expo Hall A.

== Schedule ==
All times are Western Indonesia Time (UTC+07:00)

Date	Time	Event
Wednesday, 22 August 2018	14:00	Group B
Wednesday, 22 August 2018	17:00	Group A

== Records ==
Prior to this competition, the existing world, Asian and Games records were as follows.

World Record	Snatch	Liao Hui (CHN)	166 kg	Almaty, Kazakhstan	10 November 2014
World Record	Clean & Jerk	Liao Hui (CHN)	198 kg	Wrocław, Poland	23 October 2013
World Record	Total	Liao Hui (CHN)	359 kg	Almaty, Kazakhstan	10 November 2014
Asian Record	Snatch	Liao Hui (CHN)	166 kg	Almaty, Kazakhstan	10 November 2014
Asian Record	Clean & Jerk	Liao Hui (CHN)	198 kg	Wrocław, Poland	23 October 2013
Asian Record	Total	Liao Hui (CHN)	359 kg	Almaty, Kazakhstan	10 November 2014
Games Record	Snatch	Kim Myong-hyok (PRK)	160 kg	Incheon, South Korea	22 September 2014
Games Record	Clean & Jerk	Kim Hak-bong (KOR)	195 kg	Bangkok, Thailand	9 December 1998
Games Record	Total	Zhang Guozheng (CHN)	345 kg	Busan, South Korea	3 October 2002

== Results ==
Legend

- NM — No mark

Rank	Athlete	Group	Snatch (kg)				Clean & Jerk (kg)				Total
Rank	Athlete	Group	1	2	3	Result	1	2	3	Result	Total
1st place, gold medalist(s)	O Kang-chol (PRK)	A	147	151	~~153~~	151	181	185	~~188~~	185	336
2nd place, silver medalist(s)	Doston Yokubov (UZB)	A	138	143	145	145	181	186	~~192~~	186	331
3rd place, bronze medalist(s)	Izzat Artykov (KGZ)	A	~~143~~	143	147	147	178	183	~~190~~	183	330
4	Triyatno (INA)	A	142	147	~~150~~	147	~~175~~	182	~~186~~	182	329
5	Tairat Bunsuk (THA)	A	145	~~148~~	~~148~~	145	178	182	~~187~~	182	327
6	Mahmoud Al-Humayd (KSA)	A	138	142	~~145~~	142	172	177	~~180~~	177	319
7	Deni (INA)	B	137	141	~~145~~	141	170	177	~~180~~	177	318
8	Masanori Miyamoto (JPN)	A	~~138~~	138	~~143~~	138	168	173	178	178	316
9	Witsanu Chantri (THA)	B	135	~~140~~	~~142~~	135	167	~~172~~	178	178	313
10	Mitsunori Konnai (JPN)	A	~~137~~	137	~~143~~	137	170	~~175~~	~~177~~	170	307
11	Mohammed Ridha (IRQ)	B	132	137	140	140	161	~~165~~	~~166~~	161	301
12	Mohsen Al-Duhaylib (KSA)	B	131	~~136~~	~~136~~	131	161	166	~~168~~	166	297
13	Jeffrey Garcia (PHI)	B	115	120	125	125	150	~~155~~	155	155	280
14	Kamal Bahadur Adhikari (NEP)	B	~~113~~	113	119	119	150	156	160	160	279
—	Won Jeong-sik (KOR)	A	~~145~~	145	~~148~~	145	~~180~~	~~180~~	~~186~~	—	NM
—	Indika Dissanayake (SRI)	B	130	~~134~~	~~134~~	130	~~155~~	~~155~~	~~160~~	—	NM
—	Majid Askari (IRI)	B	~~133~~	~~135~~	~~135~~	—	—	—	—	—	NM
—	Kim Myong-hyok (PRK)	A	~~150~~	~~150~~	~~150~~	—	—	—	—	—	NM
