= 2018 World Weightlifting Championships – Men's 73 kg =

The men's 73 kilograms competition at the 2018 World Weightlifting Championships was held on 2–4 November 2018.

== Schedule ==
| Date | Time | Event |
|---|---|---|
| 2 November 2018 | 08:00 | Group D |
| 3 November 2018 | 08:00 | Group C |
| 4 November 2018 | 10:00 | Group B |
| 4 November 2018 | 19:55 | Group A |

== Medalists ==
| Event | Gold | | Silver | | Bronze | |
|---|---|---|---|---|---|---|
| Snatch | Shi Zhiyong (CHN) | 164 kg | Vadzim Likharad (BLR) | 156 kg | Feng Lüdong (CHN) | 155 kg |
| Clean & Jerk | Shi Zhiyong (CHN) | 196 kg | Won Jeong-sik (KOR) | 195 kg | Ri Chong-song (PRK) | 187 kg |
| Total | Shi Zhiyong (CHN) | 360 kg | Won Jeong-sik (KOR) | 348 kg | Vadzim Likharad (BLR) | 343 kg |

== Records ==
Prior to this competition, the existing world records were as follows.

| World Record | Snatch | World Standard | 160 kg | — | 1 November 2018 |
| World Record | Clean & Jerk | World Standard | 194 kg | — | 1 November 2018 |
| World Record | Total | World Standard | 348 kg | — | 1 November 2018 |

== Results ==
| Rank | Athlete | Group | Snatch (kg) | | | | Clean & Jerk (kg) | | | | Total |
| Rank | Athlete | Group | 1 | 2 | 3 | Rank | 1 | 2 | 3 | Rank | Total |
|---|---|---|---|---|---|---|---|---|---|---|---|
| 1st place, gold medalist(s) | Shi Zhiyong (CHN) | A | 158 | 161 WR | 164 WR | 1st place, gold medalist(s) | 188 | 196 WR | — | 1st place, gold medalist(s) | 360 WR |
| 2nd place, silver medalist(s) | Won Jeong-sik (KOR) | B | 145 | 150 | 153 | 6 | 180 | 190 | 195 WR | 2nd place, silver medalist(s) | 348 |
| 3rd place, bronze medalist(s) | Vadzim Likharad (BLR) | A | 151 | 156 | ~~159~~ | 2nd place, silver medalist(s) | 180 | 184 | 187 | 4 | 343 |
| 4 | Ri Chong-song (PRK) | A | 150 | ~~154~~ | 155 | 4 | 182 | 187 | ~~190~~ | 3rd place, bronze medalist(s) | 342 |
| 5 | O Kang-chol (PRK) | A | 148 | 152 | 154 | 5 | ~~185~~ | 185 | ~~192~~ | 8 | 339 |
| 6 | Briken Calja (ALB) | A | 148 | 153 | ~~157~~ | 7 | 181 | 186 | ~~189~~ | 6 | 339 |
| 7 | Karem Ben Hnia (TUN) | A | 146 | 151 | ~~154~~ | 10 | 180 | ~~185~~ | 186 | 7 | 337 |
| 8 | Bozhidar Andreev (BUL) | A | 145 | 150 | 153 | 8 | 182 | ~~191~~ | ~~191~~ | 10 | 335 |
| 9 | Clarence Cummings (USA) | A | 140 | 145 | 148 | 12 | 181 JWR | ~~186~~ | 187 JWR | 5 | 335 JWR |
| 10 | Sergey Petrov (RUS) | B | 143 | 148 | 152 | 9 | 173 | 178 | 181 | 11 | 333 |
| 11 | Masanori Miyamoto (JPN) | B | 141 | 146 | 149 | 11 | 173 | 178 | 182 | 9 | 331 |
| 12 | Feng Lüdong (CHN) | A | ~~155~~ | 155 | ~~162~~ | 3rd place, bronze medalist(s) | 175 | ~~180~~ | — | 17 | 330 |
| 13 | Triyatno (INA) | B | 140 | 145 | ~~148~~ | 15 | 180 | ~~187~~ | ~~187~~ | 12 | 325 |
| 14 | David Sánchez (ESP) | B | ~~142~~ | 142 | 146 | 13 | 172 | 177 | ~~180~~ | 15 | 323 |
| 15 | Mahmoud Al-Humayd (KSA) | B | 139 | 143 | ~~145~~ | 18 | 175 | 180 | ~~183~~ | 13 | 323 |
| 16 | Tairat Bunsuk (THA) | B | 142 | 145 | ~~147~~ | 16 | ~~177~~ | 177 | ~~181~~ | 16 | 322 |
| 17 | Moustafa Wahid (EGY) | B | 139 | 142 | 144 | 17 | ~~178~~ | 178 | ~~182~~ | 14 | 322 |
| 18 | Hossein Soltani (IRI) | A | 142 | 146 | ~~150~~ | 14 | 174 | ~~178~~ | ~~180~~ | 18 | 320 |
| 19 | Rahmat Erwin Abdullah (INA) | C | 135 | ~~140~~ | 141 | 19 | 162 | 168 | 171 | 21 | 312 |
| 20 | Maksat Meredow (TKM) | B | ~~140~~ | ~~140~~ | 140 | 20 | 170 | ~~174~~ | ~~175~~ | 23 | 310 |
| 21 | Chuang Sheng-min (TPE) | C | 132 | 137 | ~~140~~ | 23 | 164 | 168 | 172 | 19 | 309 |
| 22 | Masakazu Ioroi (JPN) | B | 135 | ~~139~~ | ~~139~~ | 30 | 165 | ~~170~~ | 170 | 24 | 305 |
| 23 | Jorge Cárdenas (MEX) | C | 130 | 135 | ~~140~~ | 28 | 160 | 165 | 169 | 25 | 304 |
| 24 | Robert Joachim (GER) | C | 128 | 133 | ~~137~~ | 31 | 163 | 167 | 171 | 20 | 304 |
| 25 | Petr Petrov (CZE) | C | 131 | 134 | 137 | 25 | 162 | ~~165~~ | 166 | 27 | 303 |
| 26 | Tim Kring (DEN) | B | 137 | ~~139~~ | ~~140~~ | 26 | 165 | ~~170~~ | ~~170~~ | 29 | 302 |
| 27 | Achinta Sheuli (IND) | D | 130 | ~~135~~ | 135 | 27 | 159 | 163 | 166 | 26 | 301 |
| 28 | Mukhammadkodir Toshtemirov (UZB) | C | 133 | 138 | ~~140~~ | 21 | 156 | 162 | ~~169~~ | 30 | 300 |
| 29 | Ramazan İlhan (TUR) | C | 134 | 138 | ~~140~~ | 22 | 156 | 160 | ~~164~~ | 33 | 298 |
| 30 | Jorge Sánchez (PUR) | C | 128 | ~~132~~ | ~~132~~ | 34 | 170 | ~~175~~ | ~~180~~ | 22 | 298 |
| 31 | Mohammed Qaddoori (IRQ) | C | 132 | ~~136~~ | ~~137~~ | 32 | 165 | ~~169~~ | ~~169~~ | 28 | 297 |
| 32 | Ahmet Turan Okyay (TUR) | C | 131 | 135 | ~~138~~ | 29 | 156 | 161 | ~~167~~ | 31 | 296 |
| 33 | Marin Robu (MDA) | C | 133 | 137 | ~~140~~ | 24 | ~~158~~ | 158 | ~~164~~ | 34 | 295 |
| 34 | Pasha Ibrahimli (AZE) | C | 126 | 131 | ~~137~~ | 33 | 150 | ~~155~~ | 156 | 35 | 287 |
| 35 | Brandon Wakeling (AUS) | D | 115 | 120 | 125 | 35 | 155 | 160 | ~~165~~ | 32 | 285 |
| 36 | Fugan Aliyev (AZE) | D | ~~110~~ | 115 | 118 | 36 | 140 | 147 | 152 | 36 | 270 |
| 37 | Greg Shushu (RSA) | D | 117 | ~~122~~ | ~~122~~ | 37 | ~~150~~ | 150 | ~~156~~ | 37 | 267 |
| — | Arberi Cerciz (ALB) | B | ~~142~~ | ~~142~~ | ~~142~~ | — | — | — | — | — | — |
| — | Francis Luna-Grenier (CAN) | C | ~~130~~ | ~~130~~ | ~~130~~ | — | — | — | — | — | — |
| — | Luis Javier Mosquera (COL) | B | — | — | — | — | — | — | — | — | — |
| DQ | Nijat Rahimov (KAZ) | A | ~~147~~ | 147 | ~~152~~ | — | — | 190 | — | — | — |

== New records ==
| Snatch | 161 kg | Shi Zhiyong (CHN) | WR |
| Snatch | 164 kg | Shi Zhiyong (CHN) | WR |
| Clean & Jerk | 195 kg | Won Jeong-sik (KOR) | WR |
| Clean & Jerk | 196 kg | Shi Zhiyong (CHN) | WR |
| Total | 352 kg | Shi Zhiyong (CHN) | WR |
| Total | 360 kg | Shi Zhiyong (CHN) | WR |
