= 2017 World Weightlifting Championships – Men's 69 kg =

The Men's 69 kg competition at the 2017 World Weightlifting Championships was held on 1 December 2017.

== Schedule ==
Date	Time	Event
30 November 2017	10:55	Group B
1 December 2017	19:55	Group A

== Medalists ==
Event	Gold		Silver		Bronze	
Snatch	Won Jeong-sik (KOR)	148 kg	Tairat Bunsuk (THA)	147 kg	Mirko Zanni (ITA)	144 kg
Clean & Jerk	Doston Yokubov (UZB)	179 kg	Won Jeong-sik (KOR)	178 kg	Bernardin Matam (FRA)	177 kg
Total	Won Jeong-sik (KOR)	326 kg	Tairat Bunsuk (THA)	321 kg	Bernardin Matam (FRA)	318 kg

== Records ==
Prior to this competition, the existing world records were as follows.

World Record	Snatch	Liao Hui (CHN)	166 kg	Almaty, Kazakhstan	10 November 2014
World Record	Clean & Jerk	Liao Hui (CHN)	198 kg	Wrocław, Poland	23 October 2013
World Record	Total	Liao Hui (CHN)	359 kg	Almaty, Kazakhstan	10 November 2014

== Results ==
Rank	Athlete	Group	Snatch (kg)				Clean & Jerk (kg)				Total
Rank	Athlete	Group	1	2	3	Rank	1	2	3	Rank	Total
1st place, gold medalist(s)	Won Jeong-sik (KOR)	A	142	146	148	1st place, gold medalist(s)	~~178~~	178	~~181~~	2nd place, silver medalist(s)	326
2nd place, silver medalist(s)	Tairat Bunsuk (THA)	A	142	145	147	2nd place, silver medalist(s)	~~174~~	174	~~180~~	6	321
3rd place, bronze medalist(s)	Bernardin Matam (FRA)	A	141	~~143~~	~~143~~	6	175	177	~~181~~	3rd place, bronze medalist(s)	318
4	Briken Calja (ALB)	A	142	~~145~~	~~146~~	4	175	~~180~~	~~180~~	5	317
5	Mitsunori Konnai (JPN)	A	133	138	141	7	168	176	~~181~~	4	317
6	Doston Yokubov (UZB)	A	~~135~~	~~135~~	135	13	176	179	~~184~~	1st place, gold medalist(s)	314
7	Robert Joachim (GER)	A	135	139	141	8	170	~~175~~	~~175~~	8	311
8	Mirko Zanni (ITA)	A	140	144	~~146~~	3rd place, bronze medalist(s)	165	~~170~~	—	10	309
9	Mahmoud Al-Humayd (KSA)	A	132	~~138~~	138	11	170	~~175~~	~~175~~	7	308
10	David Sánchez (ESP)	A	140	~~144~~	~~144~~	10	165	~~170~~	—	11	305
11	Suttipong Jeeram (THA)	B	~~131~~	~~132~~	132	15	161	164	~~168~~	13	296
12	Mohsen Al-Duhaylib (KSA)	B	131	~~135~~	135	12	~~160~~	160	~~162~~	14	295
13	Erik Herrera (ECU)	B	~~124~~	124	128	18	162	167	~~169~~	9	295
14	Óscar Terrones (PER)	B	125	129	~~133~~	17	155	161	165	12	294
15	Petr Petrov (CZE)	B	~~132~~	~~132~~	132	16	158	~~164~~	~~165~~	15	290
16	Víctor Castro (ESP)	B	132	~~137~~	~~137~~	14	~~153~~	153	157	17	289
17	Charles Ssekyaaya (UGA)	B	117	~~122~~	~~122~~	19	152	157	~~160~~	16	274
—	Simon Brandhuber (GER)	B	138	142	~~145~~	5	~~160~~	~~160~~	~~160~~	—	—
—	Clarence Cummings (USA)	A	136	139	141	9	~~177~~	~~178~~	~~178~~	—	—
—	Hakim Ssempereza (UGA)	B	108	111	~~114~~	20	~~140~~	~~140~~	~~140~~	—	—
—	Karem Ben Hnia (TUN)	A	~~145~~	~~145~~	~~146~~	—	—	—	—	—	—
