= Shi Zhiyong =

Shi Zhiyong may refer to:

- Shi Zhiyong (weightlifter, born 1980) (Chinese: 石智勇; pinyin: Shí Zhìyǒng), Chinese retired weightlifter, born in Longyan, Fujian, who won gold at the men's 62 kg class of 2004 Summer Olympics
- Shi Zhiyong (weightlifter, born 1993) (Chinese: 石智勇; pinyin: Shí Zhìyǒng), Chinese weightlifter, born in Guilin, Guangxi, who won gold at the men's 69 kg class of 2016 Summer Olympics
