= Shi Zhiyong (weightlifter, born 1993) =

Chinese weightlifter (born 1993)

Personal information
- Nationality: Chinese
- Born: 10 October 1993 (age 32) Lingui District, Guilin, Guangxi, China
- Height: 1.68 m (5 ft 6 in)
- Weight: 72.90 kg (161 lb)

Sport
- Country: China
- Sport: Weightlifting
- Event: –73 kg
- Club: Zhejiang Province

Achievements and titles
- Personal bests: Snatch: 169 kg (2021, CWR); Clean and jerk: 198 kg (2019, WR); Total: 364 kg (2021, WR)
Medal record
Men's weightlifting
Representing China
Olympic Games
Gold medal – first place	2016 Rio de Janeiro	–69 kg
Gold medal – first place	2020 Tokyo	–73 kg
World Championships
Gold medal – first place	2015 Houston	–69 kg
Gold medal – first place	2018 Ashgabat	–73 kg
Gold medal – first place	2019 Pattaya	–73 kg
Asian Championships
Gold medal – first place	2012 Pyeongtaek	–69 kg
Gold medal – first place	2016 Tashkent	–77 kg
Gold medal – first place	2019 Ningbo	–73 kg
Gold medal – first place	2020 Tashkent	–73 kg
National Games of China
Gold medal – first place	2017 Tianjin	–69 kg
Gold medal – first place	2021 Shaanxi	–73 kg

Shi Zhiyong (Chinese: 石智勇; pinyin: Shí Zhìyǒng; born 10 October 1993) is a Chinese weightlifter, two time Olympic Champion, three time World Champion and four time Asian Champion competing in the 69 kg category until 2018 and 73 kg starting in 2018 after the International Weightlifting Federation reorganized the categories.

Shi was born Shi Lei (Chinese: 石磊), but his coach Zhan Xugang gave him the new name after former Olympic Champion Shi Zhiyong.

He holds the current world record in the -73 kg class for the snatch, and has set 13 world records.

== Career ==
=== Olympics ===
In 2016 he competed at the 2016 Summer Olympics in the 69 kg category. After the snatch portion of the competition he was in second place, trailing Daniyar İsmayilov by a single kg. Shi was able to beat Daniyar İsmayilov by two kg in the clean & jerk portion of the competition, lifting 190 kg over Daniyar's 188 kg, this gave him a total of 352 kg and an Olympic gold medal.

In 2021 he competed at the 2020 Summer Olympics in the 73 kg category. He set an Olympic record in both the snatch and clean & jerk portions, with lifts of 166 kg and 198 kg respectively, thereby setting the world record. Following this victory, he is now an Olympic champion in 2 weight categories.

In August 2024, Shi competed in the men's 73 kg event at the 2024 Summer Olympics held in Paris, France. He lifted 165 kg in the Snatch and took the lead with 10 kg ahead of second place, but he failed to register a successful attempt in the Clean & Jerk.

=== World Championships ===
In 2015 he competed at his first World Championships. After the snatch portion he finished third, two kg behind Oleg Chen and Daniyar İsmayilov. In the clean and jerk portion he lifted 190 kg, which gave him a total of 348 kg and a gold medal in the clean & jerk and total.

In 2018 the International Weightlifting Federation reorganized the categories and Shi competed in the newly created 73 kg category. He put on a dominating display, earning gold in the snatch with a new world record of 164 kg, this gave him an 8 kg lead over second place. During the clean & jerk, he also won gold by out lifting Won Jeong-sik by 1 kg to set a new world record clean & jerk of 196 kg. He won gold medals in all lifts and finished with a total of 360 kg, a full 12 kg over the silver medalist Won Jeong-sik.

Coming into the 2019 World Weightlifting Championships, he was the heavy favorite in the 73 kg category. During the snatch portion of the competition, he was the last competitor to attempt a lift after Bozhidar Andreev completed a 157 kg lift. With his first lift of 160 kg he secured the gold medal in the snatch, and added two more successful lifts to increase his snatch to 166 kg. Coming into the clean & jerk portion he was 9 kg ahead of the silver medalist Andreev, he completed his first lift of 190 kg which gave him a 356 kg total. After O Kang-chol completed his final lift, Shi clinched the gold medal in the total. His final lift was a world record lift of 197 kg, which also set a new world record in the total with 363 kg.

== Major results ==
Year	Venue	Weight	Snatch (kg)				Clean & Jerk (kg)				Total	Rank
Year	Venue	Weight	1	2	3	Rank	1	2	3	Rank	Total	Rank
Olympic Games
2016	Rio de Janeiro, Brazil	69 kg	156	160	162	—N/a	188	190	~~198~~	—N/a	352	1st place, gold medalist(s)
2020	Tokyo, Japan	73 kg	158	163	166 OR	—N/a	188	~~192~~	198 OR	—N/a	364 WR	1st place, gold medalist(s)
2024	Paris, France	73 kg	161	165	~~168~~	—N/a	~~191~~	~~191~~	~~191~~	—N/a	DNF	—
World Championships
2015	Houston, United States	69 kg	155	158	~~161~~	3rd place, bronze medalist(s)	187	~~190~~	190	1st place, gold medalist(s)	348	1st place, gold medalist(s)
2018	Ashgabat, Turkmenistan	73 kg	158	161 WR	164 WR	1st place, gold medalist(s)	188	196 WR	—	1st place, gold medalist(s)	360 WR	1st place, gold medalist(s)
2019	Pattaya, Thailand	73 kg	160	163	166	1st place, gold medalist(s)	190	197 WR	—	1st place, gold medalist(s)	363 WR	1st place, gold medalist(s)
2022	Bogotá, Colombia	81 kg	—	—	—	—	—	—	—	—	—	—
2023	Riyadh, Saudi Arabia	73 kg	—	—	—	—	—	—	—	—	—	—
IWF World Cup
2019	Tianjin, China	73 kg	155	160	165	1st place, gold medalist(s)	187	192	198	1st place, gold medalist(s)	363	1st place, gold medalist(s)
2024	Phuket, Thailand	73 kg	161	~~164~~	165	1st place, gold medalist(s)	191	~~195~~	~~196~~	5	356	2nd place, silver medalist(s)
Asian Championships
2012	Pyeongtaek, South Korea	69 kg	130	137	144	3rd place, bronze medalist(s)	170	~~180~~	180	1st place, gold medalist(s)	324	1st place, gold medalist(s)
2016	Tashkent, Uzbekistan	77 kg	152	~~157~~	157	3rd place, bronze medalist(s)	183	~~191~~	191	1st place, gold medalist(s)	348	1st place, gold medalist(s)
2019	Ningbo, China	73 kg	160	165 WR	168 WR	1st place, gold medalist(s)	~~193~~	~~193~~	194	1st place, gold medalist(s)	362 WR	1st place, gold medalist(s)
2021	Tashkent, Uzbekistan	73 kg	160	164	169 CWR	1st place, gold medalist(s)	190	194	—	1st place, gold medalist(s)	363	1st place, gold medalist(s)
2023	Jinju, South Korea	73 kg	—	—	—	—	—	—	—	—	—	—

- CWR: Current world record
- WR: World record
