= 2014 World Weightlifting Championships – Men's 69 kg =

The men's 69 kilograms event at the 2014 World Weightlifting Championships was held on 9 and 10 November 2014 in Baluan Sholak Sports Palace, Almaty, Kazakhstan.

== Schedule ==
| Date | Time | Event |
|---|---|---|
| 9 November 2014 | 09:00 | Group D |
| 9 November 2014 | 21:00 | Group C |
| 10 November 2014 | 11:00 | Group B |
| 10 November 2014 | 19:00 | Group A |

== Medalists ==
| Event | Gold | | Silver | | Bronze | |
|---|---|---|---|---|---|---|
| Snatch | Liao Hui (CHN) | 166 kg | Oleg Chen (RUS) | 154 kg | Mohamed Ehab (EGY) | 152 kg |
| Clean & Jerk | Liao Hui (CHN) | 193 kg | Mohamed Ehab (EGY) | 182 kg | Kim Myong-hyok (PRK) | 182 kg |
| Total | Liao Hui (CHN) | 359 kg | Mohamed Ehab (EGY) | 334 kg | Kim Myong-hyok (PRK) | 334 kg |

== Records ==
Prior to this competition, the existing world records were as follows.

| World Record | Snatch | Georgi Markov (BUL) | 165 kg | Sydney, Australia | 20 September 2000 |
| World Record | Clean & Jerk | Liao Hui (CHN) | 198 kg | Wrocław, Poland | 23 October 2013 |
| World Record | Total | Liao Hui (CHN) | 358 kg | Wrocław, Poland | 23 October 2013 |

== Results ==
| Rank | Athlete | Group | Body weight | Snatch (kg) | | | | Clean & Jerk (kg) | | | | Total |
| Rank | Athlete | Group | Body weight | 1 | 2 | 3 | Rank | 1 | 2 | 3 | Rank | Total |
|---|---|---|---|---|---|---|---|---|---|---|---|---|
| 1st place, gold medalist(s) | Liao Hui (CHN) | A | 68.68 | 155 | ~~160~~ | 166 | 1st place, gold medalist(s) | 185 | 193 | — | 1st place, gold medalist(s) | 359 |
| 2nd place, silver medalist(s) | Mohamed Ehab (EGY) | A | 68.55 | 145 | 149 | 152 | 3rd place, bronze medalist(s) | ~~177~~ | 177 | 182 | 2nd place, silver medalist(s) | 334 |
| 3rd place, bronze medalist(s) | Kim Myong-hyok (PRK) | A | 68.73 | ~~152~~ | 152 | ~~156~~ | 4 | 182 | ~~184~~ | ~~184~~ | 3rd place, bronze medalist(s) | 334 |
| 4 | Oleg Chen (RUS) | A | 68.78 | ~~153~~ | 153 | 154 | 2nd place, silver medalist(s) | 175 | 178 | ~~182~~ | 5 | 332 |
| 5 | Vanik Avetisyan (ARM) | A | 68.93 | 137 | 141 | ~~143~~ | 13 | 173 | 179 | ~~183~~ | 4 | 320 |
| 6 | I Ketut Ariana (INA) | A | 68.26 | 140 | 145 | ~~148~~ | 5 | 170 | 174 | ~~176~~ | 12 | 319 |
| 7 | Bernardin Matam (FRA) | A | 68.66 | 138 | 142 | ~~145~~ | 10 | 173 | 177 | ~~182~~ | 6 | 319 |
| 8 | Jaber Behrouzi (IRI) | B | 68.30 | 138 | ~~142~~ | 142 | 8 | 167 | 172 | 176 | 8 | 318 |
| 9 | Kwon Chang-il (PRK) | A | 68.60 | 142 | ~~148~~ | ~~148~~ | 9 | 170 | 175 | ~~180~~ | 10 | 317 |
| 10 | Albert Linder (KAZ) | A | 68.34 | 140 | 145 | ~~150~~ | 6 | 170 | ~~180~~ | ~~183~~ | 16 | 315 |
| 11 | Doston Yokubov (UZB) | A | 68.75 | 133 | 137 | ~~139~~ | 21 | 172 | 177 | ~~181~~ | 7 | 314 |
| 12 | Deni (INA) | A | 67.85 | 140 | ~~146~~ | ~~146~~ | 15 | 173 | ~~180~~ | ~~181~~ | 14 | 313 |
| 13 | Tairat Bunsuk (THA) | B | 68.64 | ~~137~~ | 137 | ~~141~~ | 20 | 168 | 171 | 176 | 9 | 313 |
| 14 | David Sánchez (ESP) | C | 68.64 | 133 | 137 | ~~140~~ | 19 | 168 | 171 | 175 | 11 | 312 |
| 15 | Lee Hyeong-seop (KOR) | B | 68.71 | 130 | ~~134~~ | 135 | 22 | 170 | 174 | ~~179~~ | 13 | 309 |
| 16 | Edwin Mosquera (COL) | B | 68.80 | 137 | 141 | 143 | 7 | 165 | ~~170~~ | ~~170~~ | 20 | 308 |
| 17 | Masakazu Ioroi (JPN) | B | 68.33 | 138 | ~~141~~ | ~~141~~ | 17 | 166 | ~~170~~ | ~~170~~ | 19 | 304 |
| 18 | Víctor Castro (ESP) | C | 67.79 | 130 | 135 | 140 | 14 | 155 | 160 | 163 | 21 | 303 |
| 19 | Izzat Artykov (KGZ) | B | 68.49 | ~~133~~ | ~~133~~ | 133 | 23 | 165 | 170 | ~~175~~ | 17 | 303 |
| 20 | Pan Chien-hung (TPE) | B | 68.62 | 133 | ~~138~~ | ~~138~~ | 24 | 160 | 165 | 169 | 18 | 302 |
| 21 | Simon Brandhuber (GER) | B | 68.40 | 137 | ~~140~~ | ~~140~~ | 18 | 160 | ~~164~~ | ~~164~~ | 25 | 297 |
| 22 | Caleb Williams (USA) | C | 68.52 | 125 | ~~130~~ | ~~130~~ | 35 | ~~165~~ | 165 | 171 | 15 | 296 |
| 23 | Constantine Clement (MAS) | D | 68.88 | 133 | 139 | 141 | 12 | 155 | ~~160~~ | ~~161~~ | 29 | 296 |
| 24 | Enrique Valencia (ECU) | C | 67.53 | 131 | ~~134~~ | ~~134~~ | 26 | 161 | — | — | 22 | 292 |
| 25 | Florin Bejenariu (ROU) | C | 68.80 | ~~131~~ | 131 | ~~135~~ | 27 | ~~160~~ | ~~160~~ | 160 | 27 | 291 |
| 26 | Yann Aucouturier (FRA) | C | 67.91 | ~~125~~ | 125 | ~~130~~ | 33 | ~~161~~ | 161 | ~~166~~ | 23 | 286 |
| 27 | Edwar Vásquez (VEN) | C | 68.68 | 126 | ~~132~~ | ~~132~~ | 32 | 155 | 160 | ~~166~~ | 26 | 286 |
| 28 | Erik Herrera (ECU) | C | 68.06 | 125 | ~~130~~ | ~~130~~ | 34 | ~~155~~ | 155 | 160 | 24 | 285 |
| 29 | Guwanç Atabaýew (TKM) | C | 69.00 | 130 | ~~134~~ | ~~134~~ | 28 | 155 | ~~161~~ | ~~162~~ | 30 | 285 |
| 30 | Dimitris Minasidis (CYP) | D | 68.30 | 122 | 127 | ~~130~~ | 30 | ~~150~~ | 150 | ~~155~~ | 33 | 277 |
| 31 | Jafar Al-Bagir (KSA) | D | 68.69 | 122 | 125 | ~~127~~ | 36 | 150 | ~~154~~ | ~~154~~ | 34 | 275 |
| 32 | Witsanu Chantri (THA) | D | 67.67 | 117 | 121 | 123 | 37 | 147 | 151 | ~~153~~ | 31 | 274 |
| 33 | Omkar Otari (IND) | D | 68.44 | 123 | 126 | 128 | 29 | 146 | ~~151~~ | ~~151~~ | 36 | 274 |
| 34 | Chris Freebury (GBR) | D | 67.75 | 120 | ~~126~~ | ~~126~~ | 39 | 146 | ~~151~~ | 151 | 32 | 271 |
| 35 | Hsieh Shu-yin (TPE) | D | 68.22 | 118 | 122 | ~~126~~ | 38 | 148 | ~~154~~ | ~~154~~ | 35 | 270 |
| 36 | Zsolt Lerch (HUN) | D | 68.83 | 112 | 115 | ~~120~~ | 40 | 143 | 145 | — | 37 | 260 |
| 37 | Neil Dougan (IRL) | D | 68.06 | ~~104~~ | 104 | ~~107~~ | 41 | ~~135~~ | 135 | ~~137~~ | 38 | 239 |
| — | Serghei Cechir (MDA) | A | 68.68 | 138 | ~~142~~ | 142 | 11 | ~~171~~ | ~~172~~ | ~~172~~ | — | — |
| — | Morteza Rezaeian (IRI) | B | 68.68 | 135 | ~~139~~ | 139 | 16 | ~~165~~ | ~~165~~ | ~~167~~ | — | — |
| — | Gökhan Özenoğlu (TUR) | B | 68.92 | 130 | ~~133~~ | 133 | 25 | ~~161~~ | ~~161~~ | ~~162~~ | — | — |
| — | Mohsen Al-Duhaylib (KSA) | C | 67.84 | 126 | ~~130~~ | ~~130~~ | 31 | ~~152~~ | ~~152~~ | ~~152~~ | — | — |
| — | Petr Petrov (CZE) | D | 68.23 | ~~124~~ | ~~124~~ | ~~124~~ | — | 152 | ~~156~~ | 156 | 28 | — |

== New records ==
| Snatch | 166 kg | Liao Hui (CHN) | WR |
| Total | 359 kg | Liao Hui (CHN) | WR |
