= Mohsen Bahramzadeh =

Iranian weightlifter (born 1990)

Personal information
- Native name: محسن بهرام زاده
- Nationality: Iranian
- Born: 13 August 1990 (age 36)
- Weight: 104.45 kg (230.3 lb)

Sport
- Country: Iran
- Sport: Weightlifting
- Event: 105 kg

Achievements and titles
- Personal bests: Snatch: 185 kg (2013); Clean and jerk: 206 kg (2014); Total: 390 kg (2013)
Medal record
Men's weightlifting
Representing Iran
Asian Championships
Silver medal – second place	2013 Astana	105 kg

Mohsen Bahramzadeh (Persian: محسن بهرام زاده, born 13 August 1990) is an Iranian weightlifter who won the bronze medal in the Men's 105 kg weight class at the 2013 Asian Weightlifting Championships.

== Major results ==
Year	Venue	Weight	Snatch (kg)				Clean & Jerk (kg)				Total	Rank
Year	Venue	Weight	1	2	3	Rank	1	2	3	Rank	Total	Rank
World Championships
2014	Almaty, Kazakhstan	105 kg	~~178~~	178	~~188~~	10	206	~~212~~	~~212~~	17	384	13
Asian Championships
2013	(Kazakhstan) Astana, kazakhstan	105 kg	175	185	~~188~~	2nd place, silver medalist(s)	~~205~~	~~205~~	205	3rd place, bronze medalist(s)	390	2nd place, silver medalist(s)
2016	Tashkent, Uzbekistan	+105 kg	180	~~185~~	~~189~~	6	210	221	~~229~~	7	401	7
