= Kia Ghadami =

Iranian weightlifter (born 1991)

Personal information
- Native name: کیا قدمی
- Nationality: Iranian
- Born: 26 January 1991 (age 35)
- Weight: 103.87 kg (229.0 lb)

Sport
- Country: Iran
- Sport: Weightlifting
- Event: 105 kg

Achievements and titles
- Personal bests: Snatch: 178 kg (2014); Clean and jerk: 220 kg (2014); Total: 398 kg (2014)
Medal record
Men's weightlifting
Representing Iran
Asian Championships
Bronze medal – third place	2013 Astana	105 kg

Kia Ghadami (Persian: کیا قدمی, born 26 January 1991) is an Iranian weightlifter who won the bronze medal in the Men's 105 kg weight class at the 2013 Asian Weightlifting Championships.

== Major results ==
Year	Venue	Weight	Snatch (kg)				Clean & Jerk (kg)				Total	Rank
Year	Venue	Weight	1	2	3	Rank	1	2	3	Rank	Total	Rank
World Championships
2013	Wrocław, Poland	105 kg	173	~~178~~	~~179~~	9	210	~~216~~	~~216~~	9	383	7
2014	Almaty, Kazakhstan	105 kg	171	178	~~181~~	9	210	220	~~223~~	5	398	5
Asian Championships
2013	(Kazakhstan) Astana, kazakhstan	105 kg	168	174	~~179~~	3rd place, bronze medalist(s)	~~205~~	205	~~216~~	2nd place, silver medalist(s)	379	3rd place, bronze medalist(s)
2016	Tashkent, Uzbekistan	105 kg	168	~~172~~	~~173~~	5	208	~~213~~	~~214~~	4	376	4
2019	Ningbo, China	109 kg	170	~~175~~	175	6	~~216~~	~~217~~	218	4	393	5
Summer Universiade
2017	New Taipei, Taiwan	105 kg	166	~~170~~	170	3	203	211	~~222~~	2	381	3rd place, bronze medalist(s)
World Junior Championships
2011	Penang, Malaysia	105 kg	161	167	~~171~~	7	201	~~207~~	~~207~~	6	368	7
