= David Sánchez (weightlifter) =

Spanish weightlifter (born 1994)

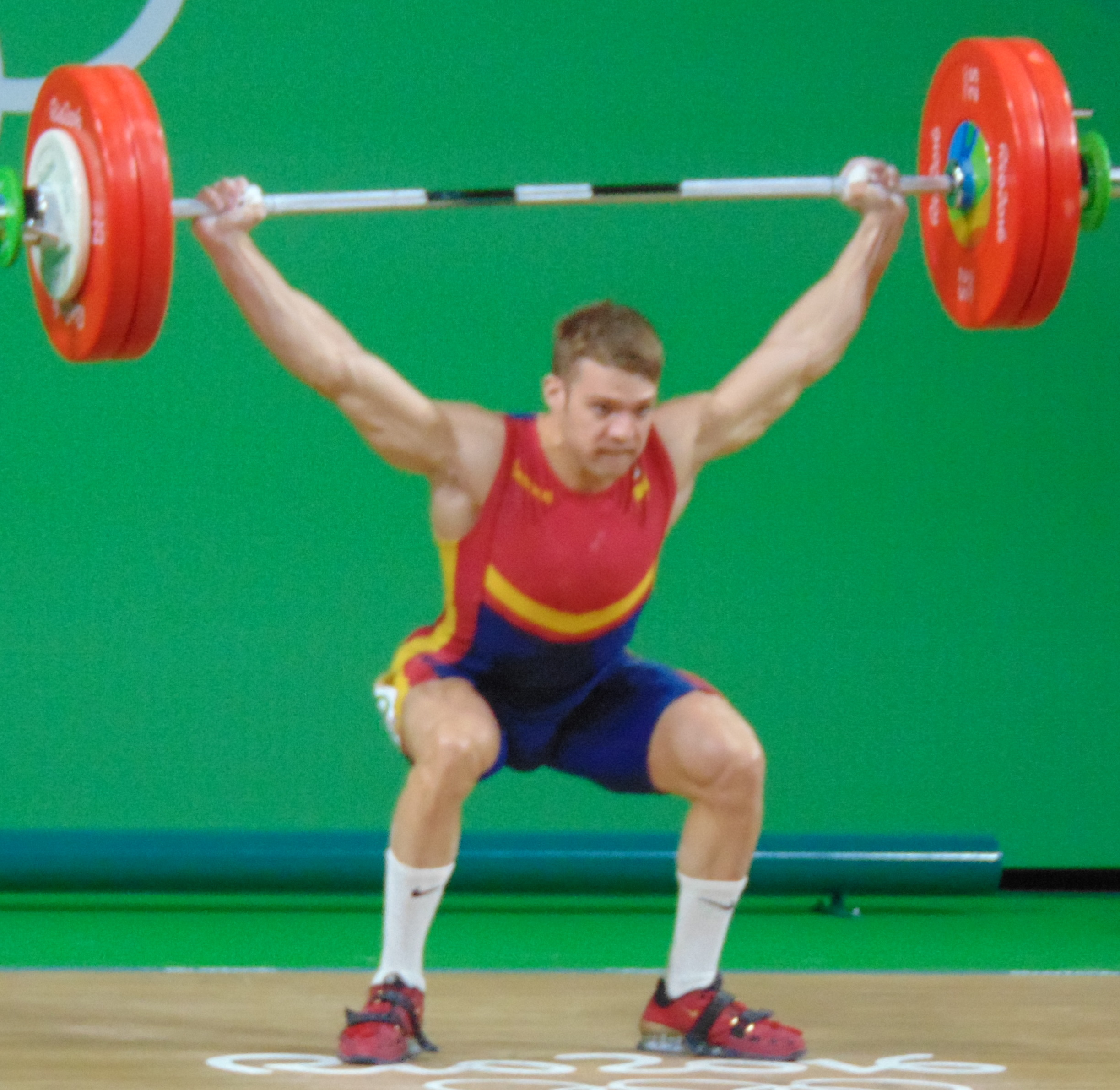

Personal information
- Full name: David Sánchez López
- Born: 20 July 1994 (age 31) El Ejido, Spain
- Height: 1.66 m (5 ft 5 in)
- Weight: 69 kg (152 lb)

Sport
- Country: Spain
- Sport: Weightlifting
- Club: LPV Melilla
- Coached by: Matias Fernandez
Medal record
European Championships
Bronze medal – third place	2016 Førde	–69 kg
Bronze medal – third place	2018 Bucharest	–69 kg
Silver medal – second place	2023 Yerevan	–73 kg

David Sánchez López (born 20 July 1994) is a Spanish weightlifter who competes in the 69 kg category. He placed tenth at the 2016 Olympics, and competed at the 2014 and 2015 World Weightlifting Championships.

Taking up the sport as a fifteen-year-old teen, Sánchez was named Male Sportsperson of the Year in 2013.

== Major results ==
Year	Venue	Weight	Snatch (kg)				Clean & Jerk (kg)				Total	Rank
Year	Venue	Weight	1	2	3	Rank	1	2	3	Rank	Total	Rank
Olympic Games
2016	Rio de Janeiro, Brazil	69 kg	137	142	~~145~~	—N/a	170	175	~~177~~	—N/a	317	10
2020	Tokyo, Japan	73 kg	142	146	~~150~~	—N/a	~~177~~	177	~~180~~	—N/a	323	10
World Championships
2014	Almaty, Kazakhstan	69 kg	133	137	~~140~~	19	168	171	175	11	312	14
2015	Houston, United States	69 kg	135	~~140~~	140	21	165	170	~~174~~	21	310	18
2017	Anaheim, United States	69 kg	140	~~144~~	~~144~~	10	165	~~170~~	—	11	305	10
2018	Ashgabat, Turkmenistan	73 kg	~~142~~	142	146	13	172	177	~~180~~	15	323	14
2019	Pattaya, Thailand	73 kg	140	~~145~~	145	16	175	180	183	8	328	11
2023	Riyadh, Saudi Arabia	73 kg	~~145~~	145	148	8	184	~~188~~	~~188~~	5	332	5
European Championships
2016	Førde, Norway	69 kg	138	~~143~~	143	4	170	175	~~178~~	4	318	3rd place, bronze medalist(s)
2017	Split, Croatia	69 kg	135	140	~~143~~	6	169	~~173~~	173	4	313	4
2018	Bucharest, Romania	69 kg	137	139	141	3rd place, bronze medalist(s)	~~168~~	168	~~172~~	5	309	3rd place, bronze medalist(s)
2019	Batumi, Georgia	73 kg	143	~~147~~	147	7	177	~~183~~	183	3rd place, bronze medalist(s)	330	4
2021	Moscow, Russia	73 kg	143	147	149	7	~~179~~	179	183	3rd place, bronze medalist(s)	332	5
2023	Yerevan, Armenia	73 kg	145	148	150	6	180	183	185	2nd place, silver medalist(s)	335	2nd place, silver medalist(s)
2025	Chișinău, Moldova	73 kg	132	137	~~140~~	7	160	165	~~168~~	9	302	8
