= Weightlifting at the 2020 Summer Olympics – Men's 73 kg =

Men's 73 kg at the Games of the XXXII Olympiad
- Venue: Tokyo International Forum
- Date: 28 July 2021
- Competitors: 14 from 14 nations
- Winning total: 364 kg WR

Medalists
1st place, gold medalist(s)		Shi Zhiyong	China
2nd place, silver medalist(s)		Julio Mayora	Venezuela
3rd place, bronze medalist(s)		Rahmat Erwin Abdullah	Indonesia

The men's 73 kg weightlifting competitions at the 2020 Summer Olympics in Tokyo took place on 28 July at the Tokyo International Forum. The weightlifter from China won the gold, with a combined lift of 364 kg.

== Records ==
Prior to this competition, the existing world and Olympic records were as follows.

World Record	Snatch	Shi Zhiyong (CHN)	169 kg	Tashkent, Uzbekistan	20 April 2021
World Record	Clean & Jerk	Shi Zhiyong (CHN)	198 kg	Tianjin, China	10 December 2019
World Record	Total	Shi Zhiyong (CHN)	363 kg	Pattaya, Thailand	21 September 2019
Olympic Record	Snatch	Olympic Standard	158 kg	—	1 November 2018
Olympic Record	Clean & Jerk	Olympic Standard	190 kg	—	1 November 2018
Olympic Record	Total	Olympic Standard	345 kg	—	1 November 2018

== Results ==
Rank	Athlete	Nation	Group	Body weight	Snatch (kg)				Clean & Jerk (kg)				Total
Rank	Athlete	Nation	Group	Body weight	1	2	3	Result	1	2	3	Result	Total
1st place, gold medalist(s)	Shi Zhiyong	China	A	72.85	158	163	166	166 OR	188	~~192~~	198	198 OR	364 WR, OR
2nd place, silver medalist(s)	Julio Mayora	Venezuela	A	72.60	150	154	156	156	186	190	~~199~~	190	346
3rd place, bronze medalist(s)	Rahmat Erwin Abdullah	Indonesia	B	72.41	142	147	152	152	180	~~190~~	190	190	342
4	Briken Calja	Albania	A	72.85	~~151~~	151	~~155~~	151	184	~~188~~	190	190	341
5	Bozhidar Andreev	Bulgaria	A	72.75	150	~~154~~	154	154	184	~~189~~	~~190~~	184	338
6	Karem Ben Hnia	Tunisia	A	72.80	148	151	153	153	185	~~190~~	~~190~~	185	338
7	Masanori Miyamoto	Japan	A	72.80	143	147	~~151~~	147	183	188	~~196~~	188	335
8	Marin Robu	Moldova	A	72.95	150	155	~~159~~	155	175	~~182~~	~~182~~	175	330
9	Clarence Cummings	United States	A	72.90	~~145~~	145	~~150~~	145	180	~~190~~	~~198~~	180	325
10	David Sánchez	Spain	A	72.90	142	146	~~150~~	146	~~177~~	177	~~180~~	177	323
11	Jorge Cárdenas	Mexico	B	72.65	~~140~~	140	145	145	170	~~175~~	175	175	320
12	Mahmoud Al-Humayd	Saudi Arabia	B	72.50	135	141	~~145~~	141	165	~~175~~	~~175~~	165	306
13	Brandon Wakeling	Australia	B	72.40	115	120	125	125	158	162	166	166	291
14	Abderrahim Moum	Morocco	B	71.95	120	~~127~~	127	127	~~142~~	142	151	151	278

== New records ==
Snatch	163 kg	Shi Zhiyong (CHN)	OR
Snatch	166 kg	Shi Zhiyong (CHN)	OR
Clean & Jerk	198 kg	Shi Zhiyong (CHN)	=WR, OR
Total	354 kg	Shi Zhiyong (CHN)	OR
Total	364 kg	Shi Zhiyong (CHN)	WR, OR
