= Lin Qingfeng =

Chinese weightlifter (born 1989)

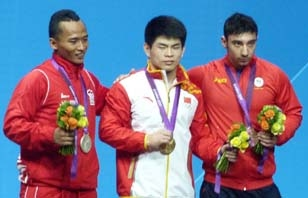
- Lin (center) at the 2012 Olympics

Personal information
- Born: January 26, 1989 (age 37) Fujian, China
- Height: 1.67 m (5 ft 6 in)

Sport
- Sport: Weightlifting
- Coached by: Chen Wenbin
Medal record
Representing China
Olympic Games
Gold medal – first place	2012 London	-69 kg
Asian Games
Gold medal – first place	2014 Incheon	-69 kg
Asian Championships
Silver medal – second place	2015 Phuket	-69 kg
Gold medal – first place	2011 Tongling	-69 kg

Lin Qingfeng (Chinese: 林清峰; pinyin: Lín Qīngfēng; born 26 January 1989) is a Chinese weightlifter who won a gold medal at the 2012 Summer Olympics in the Men's 69 kg category with a total weight lifted of 344 kg.
