= Izzat Artykov =

Kyrgyz weightlifter (born 1993)

Personal information
- Nationality: Kyrgyz
- Born: 8 September 1993 (age 32) Toktogul, Kyrgyzstan
- Height: 1.6 m (5 ft 3 in)
- Weight: 68 kg (150 lb)

Sport
- Sport: Weightlifting
- Event: 69 kg
Medal record
Men's weightlifting
Representing Kyrgyzstan
Olympic Games
Disqualified	2016 Rio de Janeiro	69 kg
Asian Games
Bronze medal – third place	2018 Jakarta	69 kg
Asian Championships
Gold medal – first place	2016 Tashkent	69 kg
- Updated on 1 June 2016

Izzat Artykov (born 8 September 1993) is a Kyrgyz weightlifter. He is the 2016 Asian champion.

== Career ==
He competed in the men's 69 kg event at the 2016 Asian Weightlifting Championships where he won a gold medal. At the 2016 Summer Olympics he won the bronze medal in the 69 kg category. He was later disqualified after failing a doping test. His bronze medal was withdrawn and awarded instead to the fourth-placed lifter, Luis Javier Mosquera.

== Major results ==
Year	Venue	Weight	Snatch (kg)				Clean & Jerk (kg)				Total	Rank
Year	Venue	Weight	1	2	3	Rank	1	2	3	Rank	Total	Rank
Representing Kyrgyzstan
Olympic Games
2016	Rio de Janeiro, Brazil	69 kg	146	151	~~155~~	5	181	188	~~196~~	3	339	DSQ
World Championships
2014	Almaty, Kazakhstan	69 kg	~~133~~	~~133~~	133	23	165	170	~~175~~	17	303	19
2010	Antalya, Turkey	56 kg	92	96	100	26	120	~~125~~	125	25	225	23
Asian Championships
2019	Ningbo, China	67 kg	127	~~132~~	132	10	~~160~~	~~160~~	~~160~~	—	—	—
2016	Tashkent, Uzbekistan	69 kg	143	147	150	1st place, gold medalist(s)	181	185	188	1st place, gold medalist(s)	338	1st place, gold medalist(s)
2015	Phuket, Thailand	69 kg	140	145	~~147~~	5	173	177	181	3rd place, bronze medalist(s)	326	4
2012	Pyeongtaek, South Korea	69 kg	130	~~135~~	~~135~~	13	155	162	~~167~~	14	292	14
Asian Games
2018	Jakarta, Indonesia	69 kg	~~143~~	143	147	3	178	183	~~190~~	3	330	3rd place, bronze medalist(s)
2014	Incheon, South Korea	69 kg	135	140	~~145~~	7	170	175	~~178~~	5	315	5

== See also ==
- Kyrgyzstan at the 2016 Summer Olympics
