= Ri Jong-hwa =

North Korean weightlifter (born 1990)

Personal information
- Born: October 16, 1990 (age 35)
- Weight: 58 kg (128 lb)

Sport
- Country: North Korea
- Sport: Weightlifting
- Event: 58 kg

Korean name
- Hangul: 리정화
- RR: Ri Jeonghwa
- MR: Ri Chŏnghwa
Medal record
Women's weightlifting
Representing North Korea
World Championships
Silver medal – second place	2014 Almaty	– 58 kg

Ri Jong-hwa (born October 10, 1990) is a North Korean weightlifter.
