= Clarence Cummings =

American weightlifter (born 2000)

Clarence Cummings Jr.
Personal information
- National team: United States
- Born: June 6, 2000 (age 26) Beaufort, South Carolina
- Years active: 2010-current
- Height: 5 ft 2 in (157 cm)
- Weight: 72.88 kg (161 lb)
- Parents: Clarence Cummings (father); Savasah Cummings (mother)
- Website: www.cj-cummings.com

Sport
- Country: United States of America
- Sport: Weightlifting
- Weight class: 73 kg
- Event: –73 kg
- Club: Team Beaufort
- Coached by: Rayford Jones

Achievements and titles
- Olympic finals: 9th
- World finals: 1st
- Regional finals: 1st
- National finals: 1st
- Personal bests: Snatch: 155 kg (2019); Clean & jerk: 193 kg (2019); Total: 347 kg (2019)
Medal record
Representing United States
Pan American Championships
Gold medal – first place	2019 Guatemala City	73 kg
Silver medal – second place	2018 Santo Domingo	69 kg
Junior World Championships
Gold medal – first place	2016 Tbilisi	–69 kg
Gold medal – first place	2017 Tokyo	–69 kg
Gold medal – first place	2018 Tashkent	–69 kg
Gold medal – first place	2019 Suva	–73 kg

Clarence Cummings Jr. (also known as CJ Cummings) (born 6 June 2000) is an American Olympic weightlifter. He is a two-time Youth Pan-American champion, Junior Pan-American champion, two-time Pan-American Champion, two-time IWF Youth World champion, and four-time IWF Junior World champion. CJ has earned 38 international medals, broken four International Weightlifting Federation Youth and Junior world records, and currently holds 23 USA Weightlifting American records.

== Career ==
In 2018 he competed at the 2018 World Weightlifting Championships in the 73 kg category setting 4 Junior World Records. Cummings, at the IWF Junior World Weightlifting Championships, won the gold medal 2016–2018 in the -69 kg weight category. At Suva in 2019, Cummings again won gold in a higher weight category, -73 kg.

He competed in the men's 73 kg event at the 2020 Summer Olympics in Tokyo, Japan.

== Major results ==
Year	Venue	Weight	Snatch (kg)				Clean & Jerk (kg)				Total	Rank
Year	Venue	Weight	1	2	3	Rank	1	2	3	Rank	Total	Rank
Olympic Games
2020	Tokyo, Japan	73 kg	~~145~~	145	~~150~~	10	180	~~190~~	~~198~~	8	325	9
World Championships
2015	Houston, United States	69 kg	123	128	132	31	166	~~174~~	~~174~~	28	298	30
2017	Anaheim, United States	69 kg	136	139	141	9	~~177~~	~~178~~	~~178~~	—	—	—
2018	Ashgabat, Turkmenistan	73 kg	140	145	148	12	181	~~186~~	187	6	335	10
2019	Pattaya, Thailand	73 kg	145	150	~~155~~	10	~~183~~	183	~~191~~	10	333	9
Pan American Weightlifting Championships
2018	Santo Domingo, Dominican Republic	69 kg	137	141	144	2nd place, silver medalist(s)	170	175	180	1st place, gold medalist(s)	324	2nd place, silver medalist(s)
2019	Guatemala City, Guatemala	73 kg	144	150	153	1st place, gold medalist(s)	182	187	191	1st place, gold medalist(s)	344	1st place, gold medalist(s)
World Junior Championships
2016	(Georgia (country)) Tbilisi, Georgia	69 kg	127	132	137	4	170	175	180	1st place, gold medalist(s)	317	1st place, gold medalist(s)
2017	Tokyo, Japan	69 kg	134	138	~~141~~	4	175	183	~~186~~	1st place, gold medalist(s)	321	1st place, gold medalist(s)
2018	Tashkent, Uzbekistan	69 kg	136	140	~~145~~	1st place, gold medalist(s)	171	174	176	1st place, gold medalist(s)	316	1st place, gold medalist(s)
2019	Suva, Fiji	73 kg	145	~~148~~	~~150~~	2nd place, silver medalist(s)	180	~~185~~	192	1st place, gold medalist(s)	337	1st place, gold medalist(s)
