= Serghei Cechir =

Moldovan weightlifter (born 1990)

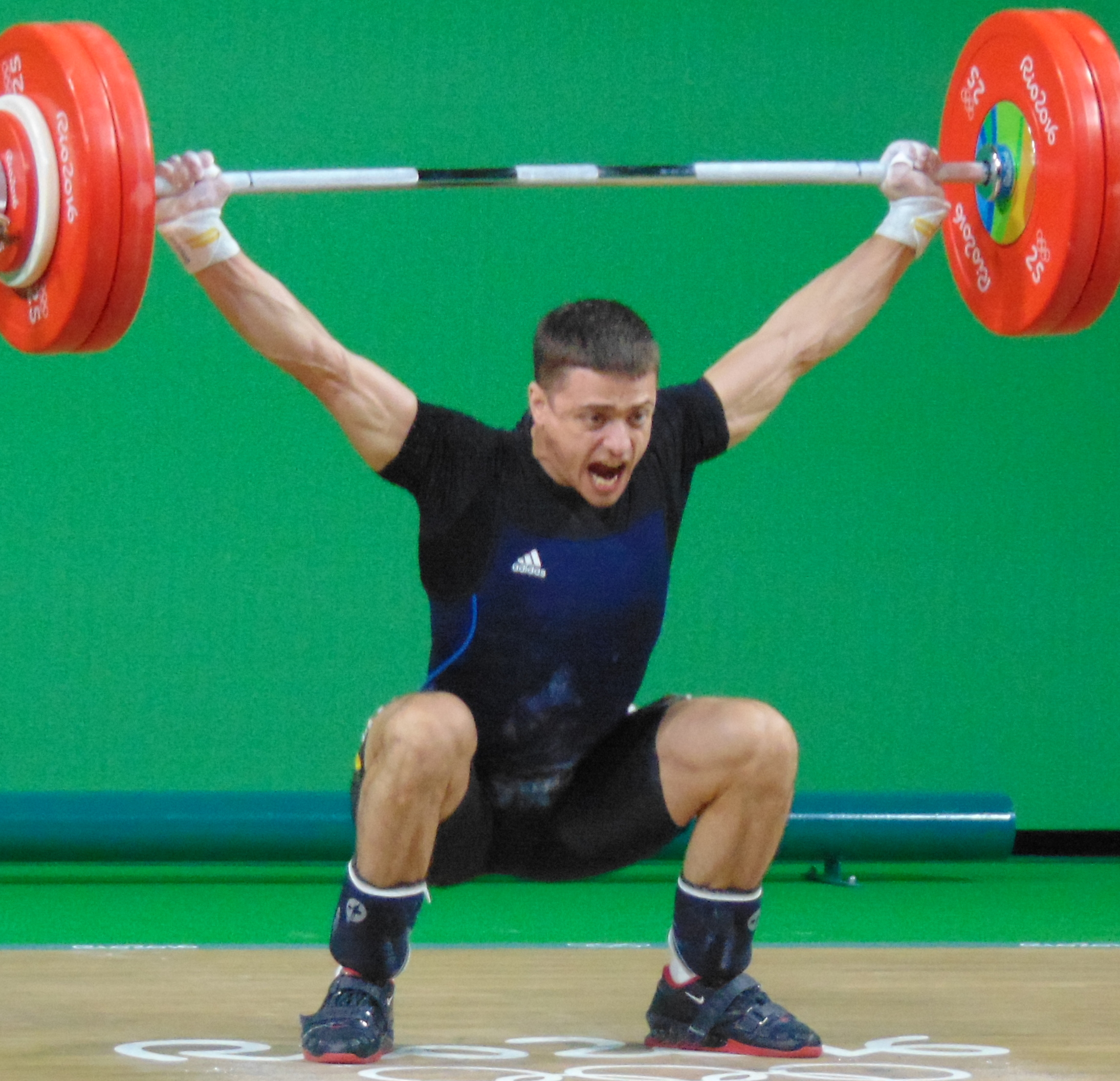
- Cechir at the 2016 Olympics

Personal information
- Nationality: Moldovan
- Born: 15 October 1990 (age 35)
- Height: 172 cm (5 ft 8 in)
- Weight: 69 kg (152 lb)

Sport
- Sport: Weightlifting
- Event: 69 kg
- Club: Chisinau Zirve
- Coached by: Gheorghe Gutu
Medal record
Men's weightlifting
Representing Moldova
European Championships
Bronze medal – third place	2014 Tel Aviv	-69 kg

Serghei Cechir (born 15 October 1990) is a Moldovan weightlifter who competes in the 69 kg division. He placed sixth at the 2016 Olympics. He won the bronze medal overall at the 2014 European Weightlifting Championships.

== Major results ==
Year	Venue	Weight	Snatch (kg)				Clean & Jerk (kg)				Total	Rank
Year	Venue	Weight	1	2	3	Rank	1	2	3	Rank	Total	Rank
World Championships
2015	Houston, United States	69 kg	138	143	~~147~~	10	170	~~176~~	~~176~~	19	313	14
2014	Almaty, Kazakhstan	69 kg	138	~~142~~	142	11	~~171~~	~~172~~	~~172~~	---	0	---
European Weightlifting Championships
2012	Antalya, Turkey	69 kg	~~135~~	135	140	8	165	171	175	2nd place, silver medalist(s)	315	5
2013		69 kg	137	141	143	3rd place, bronze medalist(s)	167	~~172~~	~~174~~	6	310	4
2014		69 kg	136	141	143	2nd place, silver medalist(s)	169	172	~~175~~	3rd place, bronze medalist(s)	315	3rd place, bronze medalist(s)
2015		69 kg	138	143	~~146~~	4	168	~~175~~	~~176~~	6	311	5
