= Won Jeong-sik =

South Korean weightlifter (born 1990)

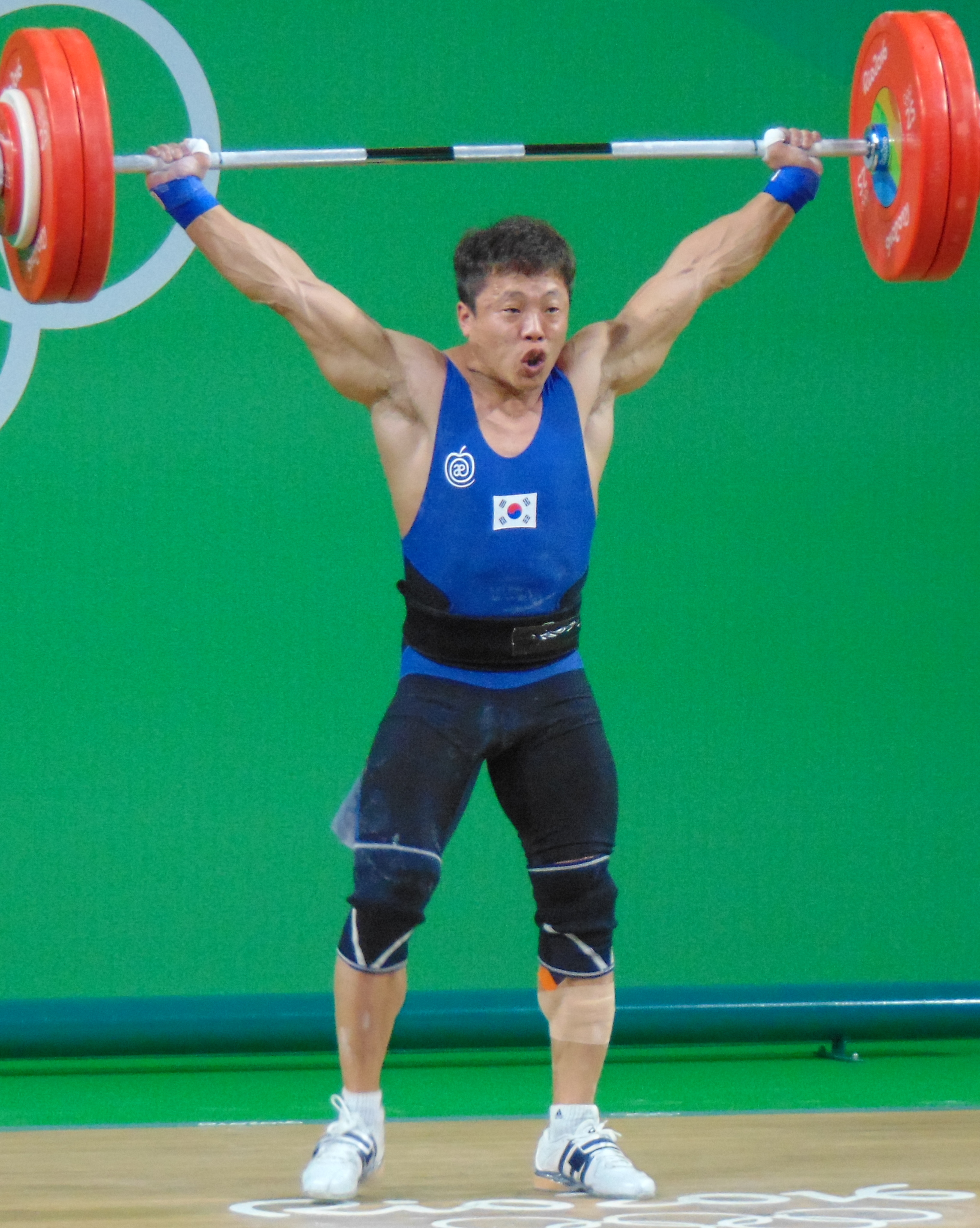
- Won at the 2016 Olympics

Personal information
- Born: 9 December 1990 (age 35) Cheolwon, Gangwon, South Korea
- Height: 1.63 m (5 ft 4 in)
- Weight: 72.57 kg (160 lb)
- Spouse: Yoon Jin-hee

Sport
- Country: South Korea
- Sport: Weightlifting
- Event: –73 kg
- Club: Korea National Sport University
- Coached by: Ahn Hyo-jak
Medal record
Men's weightlifting
Representing South Korea
World Championships
Gold medal – first place	2017 Anaheim	–69 kg
Silver medal – second place	2018 Ashgabat	–73 kg

Won Jeong-sik (Korean: 원정식, born 9 December 1990) is a South Korean weightlifter, Olympian, and World Champion competing in the 69 kg category until 2018 and 73 kg starting in 2018 after the International Weightlifting Federation reorganized the categories.

Won took up weightlifting aged 14 and has a degree from the Korea National Sport University. He is married to the fellow Olympic weightlifter Yoon Jin-hee, they have two children.

== Career ==
=== Olympics ===
He competed in the 69 kg division at the 2012 Summer Olympics placing 7th overall. In 2016 he competed at the 2016 Olympics in the 69 kg division and placed 8th overall.

=== World Championships ===
In 2017 he competed at the 2017 World Weightlifting Championships where he won the gold medal in the 69 kg division, in doing so he became the first Korean athlete to win a gold medal in this event. This was his first gold medal at the World Weightlifting Championships and his first major medal (he won a bronze medal in the clean & jerk at the 2011 World Weightlifting Championships).

In 2018 the International Weightlifting Federation reorganized the categories and Won competed in the newly created 73 kg division. He competed in the B session, and in the process of winning the silver medal he set a new world record in the clean & jerk with a lift of 195 kg. This was overtaken later in the day by Shi Zhiyong (who would later win the gold medal) with a clean & jerk of 196 kg, done in the A session.

== Major results ==
Year	Venue	Weight	Snatch (kg)				Clean & Jerk (kg)				Total	Rank
Year	Venue	Weight	1	2	3	Rank	1	2	3	Rank	Total	Rank
Olympic Games
2012	London, United Kingdom	69 kg	144	~~146~~	~~147~~	11	178	~~186~~	~~187~~	6	322	7
2016	Rio de Janeiro, Brazil	69 kg	~~143~~	143	~~146~~	9	172	177	~~180~~	9	320	8
World Championships
2011	Paris, France	69 kg	140	144	~~147~~	10	177	182	~~185~~	3rd place, bronze medalist(s)	326	6
2015	Houston, United States	69 kg	141	~~147~~	~~147~~	14	~~171~~	~~171~~	~~171~~	—	—	—
2017	Anaheim, United States	69 kg	142	146	148	1st place, gold medalist(s)	~~178~~	178	~~181~~	2nd place, silver medalist(s)	326	1st place, gold medalist(s)
2018	Ashgabat, Turkmenistan	73 kg	145	150	153	6	180	190	195 WR	2nd place, silver medalist(s)	348	2nd place, silver medalist(s)
Asian Games
2010	Guangzhou, China	69 kg	140	~~145~~	~~145~~	6	170	~~181~~	~~181~~	6	310	6
2014	Incheon, South Korea	69 kg	143	~~148~~	~~148~~	6	170	~~183~~	—	10	313	6
2018	Jakarta, Indonesia	69 kg	~~145~~	145	~~148~~	5	~~180~~	~~180~~	~~186~~	—	—	—
