= Jaber Behrouzi =

Iranian weightlifter

Personal information
- Native name: جابر بهروزی
- Nationality: Iranian
- Born: 22 August 1991 (age 35)
- Weight: 68.30 kg (150.6 lb)

Sport
- Country: Iran
- Sport: Weightlifting
- Event: 69 kg

Achievements and titles
- Personal bests: Snatch: 147 kg (2013); Clean and jerk: 183 kg (2013); Total: 330 kg (2013)
Medal record
Representing Iran
Asian Championships
Gold medal – first place	2013 Astana	69 kg
Summer Universiade
Gold medal – first place	2013 Kazan	69 kg

Jaber Behrouzi (Persian: جابر بهروزی, born 22 August 1991) is an Iranian weightlifter who won the gold medal in the Men's 69 kg weight class at the 2013 Asian Weightlifting Championships.

== Major results ==
Year	Venue	Weight	Snatch (kg)				Clean & Jerk (kg)				Total	Rank
Year	Venue	Weight	1	2	3	Rank	1	2	3	Rank	Total	Rank
World Championships
2013	Wrocław, Poland	69 kg	144	~~147~~	147	5	176	183	~~186~~	4	330	4
2014	Almaty, Kazakhstan	69 kg	138	~~142~~	142	8	167	172	176	8	318	8
2015	Houston, United States	69 kg	141	147	~~148~~	7	~~173~~	~~173~~	~~174~~	--	--	--
Asian Games
2014	Incheon, South Korea	69 kg	~~144~~	144	~~149~~	5	~~176~~	~~181~~	~~181~~	--	--	--
Asian Championships
2013	(Kazakhstan) Astana, kazakhstan	69 kg	140	145	147	1st place, gold medalist(s)	~~176~~	176	~~179~~	2nd place, silver medalist(s)	323	1st place, gold medalist(s)
2015	Phuket, Thailand	69 kg	140	145	~~155~~	6	166	~~178~~	~~178~~	8	311	7
Summer Universiade
2013	Kazan, Russia	69 kg	143	~~147~~	147	2	175	~~180~~	~~180~~	2	322	1st place, gold medalist(s)
World Junior Championships
2011	Penang, Malaysia	69 kg	~~131~~	131	134	5	~~159~~	159	169	1st place, gold medalist(s)	303	3rd place, bronze medalist(s)
