= Pan Chien-hung =

Taiwanese weightlifter

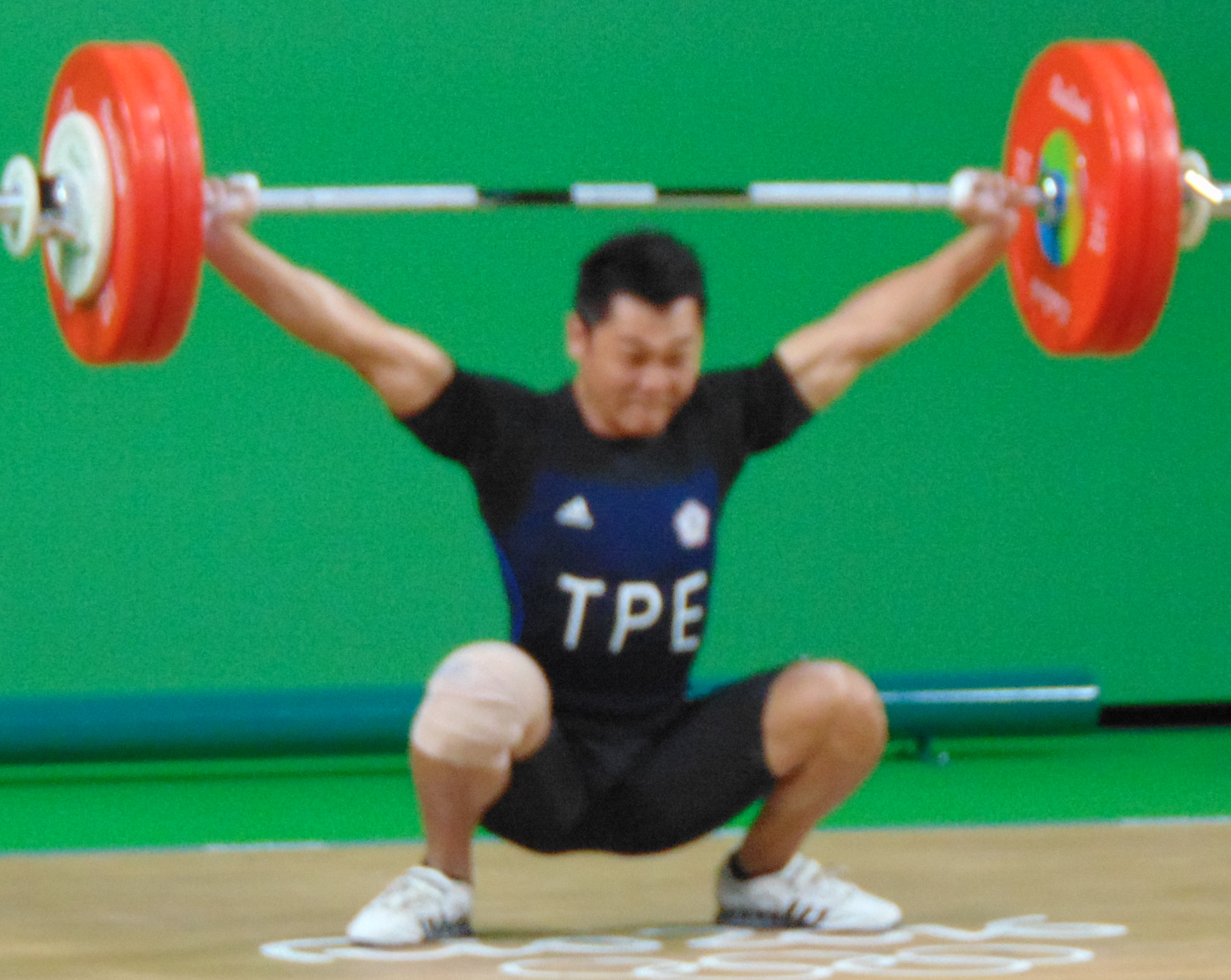

Personal information
- Full name: Pan Chien-hung
- Born: 7 August 1988 (age 37) Kaohsiung, Taiwan
- Height: 1.69 m (5 ft 7 in)
- Weight: 69 kg (152 lb)

Sport
- Country: Republic of China (Taiwan)
- Sport: Weightlifting
- Club: Kaohsiung
- Coached by: Tsai Wen-yi
- Updated on 8 April 2017

Pan Chien-hung (Chinese: 潘建宏; pinyin: Pān Jiànhóng; born August 7, 1988) is a Taiwanese weightlifter, who competes in the 69 kg category. He placed seventeenth at the 2016 Summer Olympics, also competed in the same weight category at the 2014 and 2015 World Weightlifting Championships.

== Major results ==
Year	Venue	Weight	Snatch (kg)				Clean & Jerk (kg)				Total	Rank
Year	Venue	Weight	1	2	3	Rank	1	2	3	Rank	Total	Rank
World Championships
2015	Houston, United States	69 kg	130	135	~~140~~	28	161	166	171	17	306	19
2014	Almaty, Kazakhstan	69 kg	133	~~138~~	~~138~~	24	160	165	169	18	302	20
