= Oleg Chen =

Russian weightlifter (born 1988)

Personal information
- Nationality: Russian
- Born: 22 November 1988 (age 37) Almaty, Kazakh SSR, Soviet Union
- Years active: 2010-
- Height: 1.63 m (5 ft 4 in)
- Weight: 72 kg (159 lb)

Sport
- Country: Russia
- Sport: Olympic weightlifting
- Event: 69 kg
- Club: TSFO Moscow
Medal record
Men's Weightlifting
Representing Russia
World Championships
Silver medal – second place	2011 Paris	–69 kg
Silver medal – second place	2013 Wrocław	–69 kg
Silver medal – second place	2015 Houston	–69 kg
European Championships
Gold medal – first place	2013 Tirana	–69kg
Gold medal – first place	2014 Tel Aviv	–69 kg
Silver medal – second place	2017 Split	–69 kg

Oleg Borisovich Chen (Russian: Олег Борисович Чен; born 22 November 1988) is a Russian weightlifter. He is a two-time European Champion.

His father was Korean and his mother was half Hungarian half Russian. When he was 11 his family moved to Novosibirsk; Chen now resides in Anapa.
