= Farkhad Kharki =

Kazakhstani weightlifter (born 1991)

Personal information
- Nationality: Kazakhstani
- Born: 20 April 1991 (age 35)
- Height: 1.60 m (5 ft 3 in)
- Weight: 62 kg (137 lb)

Sport
- Country: Kazakhstan
- Sport: Weightlifting
Medal record
Olympic Games
Bronze medal – third place	2016 Rio de Janeiro	–62 kg
Asian Championships
Silver medal – second place	2013 Astana	–62 kg

Farkhad Kharki (born 20 April 1991) is a Kazakhstani Olympic weightlifter. He represented his country at the 2016 Summer Olympics where he won a bronze medal in the –62 kg event.

Kharki was suspended for 2 years from July 2013 after testing positive for metenolone in a doping test.
