= O Kang-chol =

North Korean weightlifter (born 1993)

Personal information
- Nationality: North Korean
- Born: 16 September 1993 (age 32)
- Weight: 72.85 kg (161 lb)

Sport
- Country: North Korea
- Sport: Weightlifting
- Event: –73 kg

Achievements and titles
- Personal bests: Snatch: 154 kg (2018); Clean and jerk: 193 kg (2019); Total: 347 kg (2019)
Medal record
Men's weightlifting
Representing North Korea
World Championships
| Silver medal – second place | 2019 Pattaya | –73 kg |
Asian Championships
| Silver medal – second place | 2017 Ashgabat | –69 kg |
| Bronze medal – third place | 2019 Ningbo | –73 kg |
Asian Games
| Gold medal – first place | 2018 Jakarta-Palembang | –69 kg |

O Kang-Chol or O Khang-Chol (born 16 September 1993) is a North Korean weightlifter and Asian Games Champion competing in the 69 kg category until 2018 and 73 kg starting in 2018 after the International Weightlifting Federation reorganized the categories.

== Career ==
He competed at the 69 kg class at the 2018 Asian Games and won a gold medal in that event. Later in 2018 he competed in the newly created 73 kg weight class and finished fifth overall at the 2018 World Weightlifting Championships

== Major results ==
| Year | Venue | Weight | Snatch (kg) | | | | Clean & Jerk (kg) | | | | Total | Rank |
| Year | Venue | Weight | 1 | 2 | 3 | Rank | 1 | 2 | 3 | Rank | Total | Rank |
World Championships
| 2018 | Ashgabat, Turkmenistan | 73 kg | 148 | 152 | 154 | 5 | ~~185~~ | 185 | ~~192~~ | 9 | 339 | 5 |
| 2019 | Pattaya, Thailand | 73 kg | 150 | 154 | ~~156~~ | 5 | 185 | 191 | 193 | 2nd place, silver medalist(s) | 347 | 2nd place, silver medalist(s) |
Asian Championships
| 2017 | Ashgabat, Turkmenistan | 69 kg | 143 | 148 | ~~151~~ | 3rd place, bronze medalist(s) | 176 | 183 | ~~187~~ | 2nd place, silver medalist(s) | 331 | 2nd place, silver medalist(s) |
| 2019 | Ningbo, China | 73 kg | 150 | ~~154~~ | ~~154~~ | 3rd place, bronze medalist(s) | 183 | ~~188~~ | 188 | 3rd place, bronze medalist(s) | 338 | 3rd place, bronze medalist(s) |
Asian Games
| 2018 | Jakarta, Indonesia | 69 kg | 147 | 151 | ~~153~~ | 1 | 181 | 185 | ~~188~~ | 2 | 336 | 1st place, gold medalist(s) |
