= Daniyar İsmayilov =

Turkmen weightlifter (born 1992)

Daniyar Ismayilov
Personal information
- Born: 3 February 1992 (age 34) Lebap, Turkmenistan
- Height: 1.65 m (5 ft 5 in)
- Weight: 68 kg (150 lb)

Sport
- Country: Turkmenistan
- Sport: Weightlifting
- Event: – 69 kg

Achievements and titles
- Olympic finals: Rio 2016
Medal record
Representing Turkey
Olympic Games
Silver medal – second place	2016 Rio de Janeiro	Men's 69 kg
World Championships
Bronze medal – third place	2015 Houston	–69 kg
European Championships
Gold medal – first place	2016 Førde	–69 kg
Gold medal – first place	2015 Tbilisi	–69 kg
ISSF Championships
Gold medal – first place	2015 Antalya	–77 kg
Islamic Solidarity Games
Gold medal – first place	2017 Baku	69 kg

Daniyar Ismayilov (born 3 February 1992) is a Turkmen weightlifter currently competing for Turkey. He competed for Turkmenistan at the 2012 Summer Olympics. He competed for Turkey at 2016 Olympics and won a silver medal (total 351 kg.) In 2021, his doping test came back positive for the second time.
