= Doston Yokubov =

Uzbek weightlifter (born 1995)

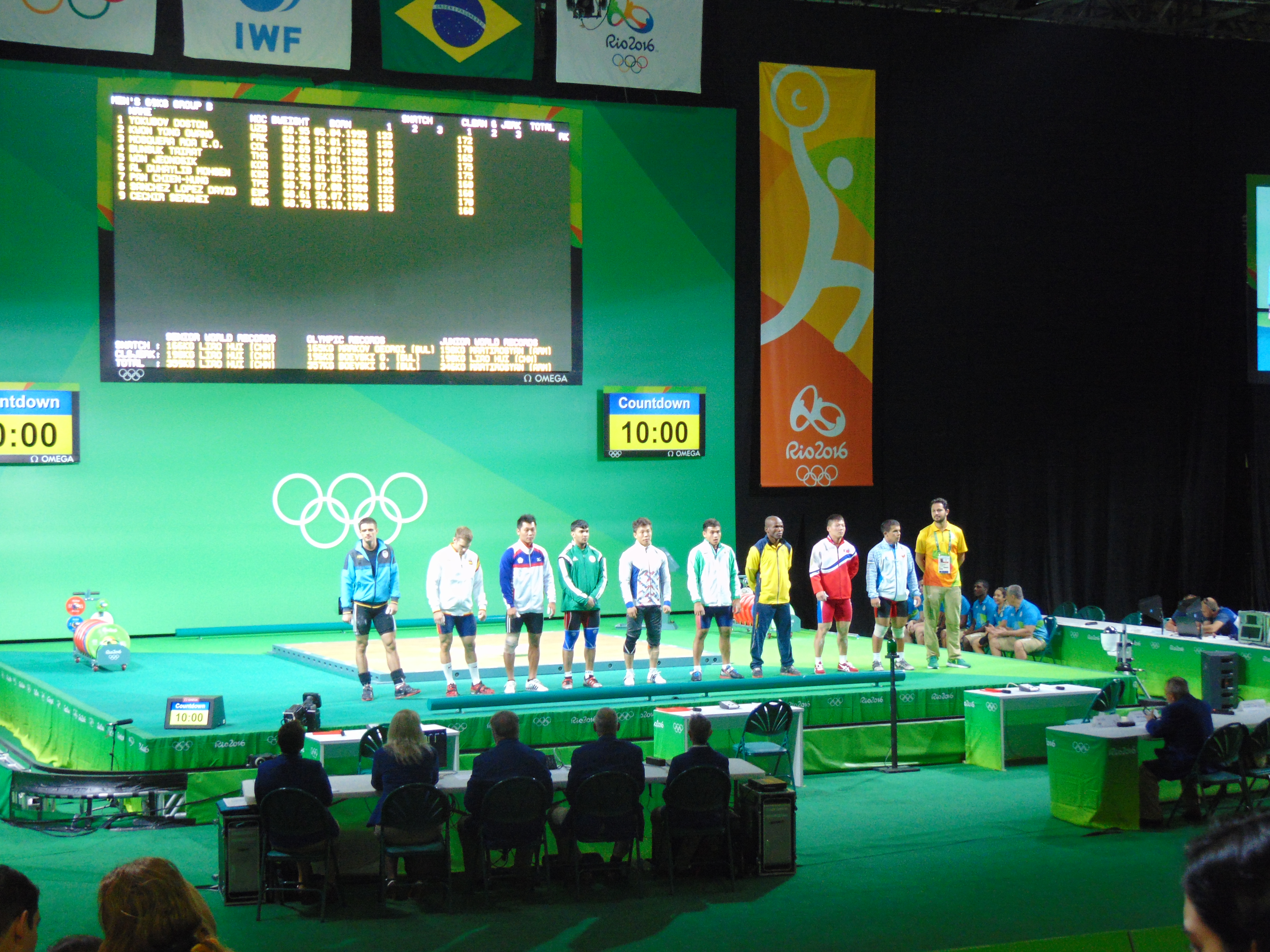
- Yokubov (most right athlete) at the 2016 Summer Olympics

Personal information
- Nationality: Uzbek
- Born: 5 April 1995 (age 31)
- Height: 1.58 m (5 ft 2 in)
- Weight: 69 kg (152 lb)

Sport
- Country: Uzbekistan
- Sport: Weightlifting
Medal record
World Championships
Gold medal – first place	2021 Tashkent	67 kg
Asian Championships
Gold medal – first place	2022 Manama	73 kg
Asian Games
Silver medal – second place	2018 Jakarta	69 kg
Islamic Solidarity Games
Silver medal – second place	2021 Konya	67 kg
Bronze medal – third place	2017 Baku	69 kg

Doston Yokubov (born 5 April 1995) is an Uzbek Olympic weightlifter. He won the gold medal in the men's 67 kg event at the 2021 World Weightlifting Championships held in Tashkent, Uzbekistan.

Yokubov also won the gold in the 73 kg division in the 2022 Asian Championships. He also represented his country at the 2016 Summer Olympics held in Rio de Janeiro, Brazil.

== Major results ==
Year	Venue	Weight	Snatch (kg)				Clean & Jerk (kg)				Total	Rank
Year	Venue	Weight	1	2	3	Rank	1	2	3	Rank	Total	Rank
Representing Uzbekistan
Olympic Games
2016	Rio de Janeiro, Brazil	69 kg	133	137	~~140~~	17	172	176	~~181~~	12	313	14
World Championships
2013	Wrocław, Poland	69 kg	~~125~~	125	129	17	160	166	~~172~~	12	295	14
2014	Almaty, Kazakhstan	69 kg	133	137	~~139~~	21	172	177	~~181~~	7	314	11
2017	Anaheim, United States	69 kg	~~135~~	~~135~~	135	13	176	179	~~184~~	1st place, gold medalist(s)	314	6
2018	Ashgabat, Turkmenistan	67 kg	135	~~139~~	139	12	177	180	~~184~~	2nd place, silver medalist(s)	319	4
Asian Games
2018	Jakarta, Indonesia	69 kg	138	143	145	4	181	186	~~192~~	1	331	2nd place, silver medalist(s)
