= Mohsen Al-Duhaylib =

Saudi Arabian weightlifter (born 1994)

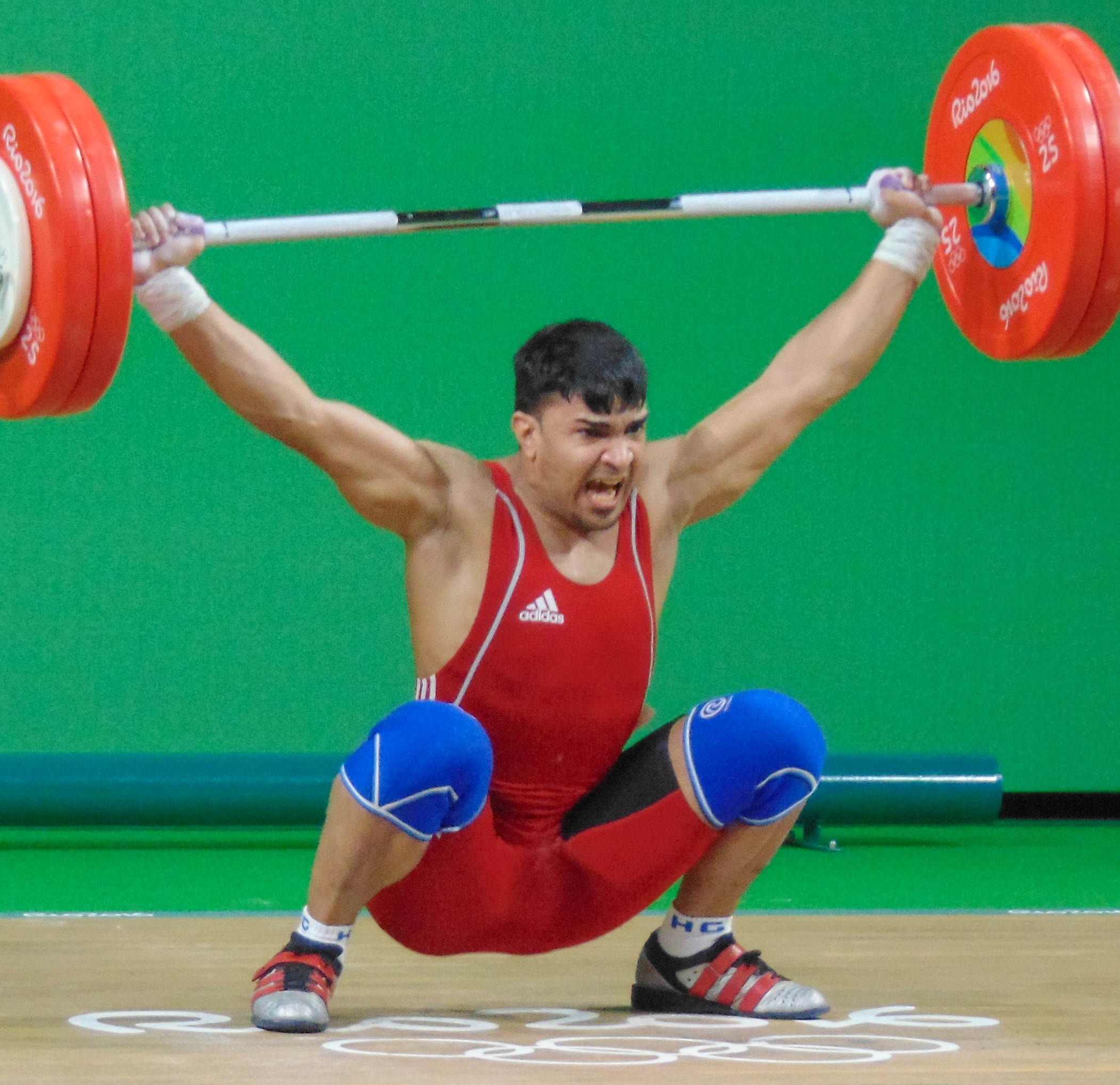

Personal information
- Full name: Mohsen Hussain Al-Duhaylib
- Born: 1 May 1994 (age 32)
- Height: 1.63 m (5 ft 4 in)
- Weight: 69 kg (152 lb)

Sport
- Country: Saudi Arabia
- Sport: Weightlifting
- Club: Alkhuyldeh Club
- Updated on 8 April 2017

Mohsen Hussain Al-Duhaylib (Arabic: محسن الدحيلب; born 1 May 1994) is a Saudi Arabian weightlifter who competes in the 69 kg category. He placed sixteenth at the 2016 Summer Olympics, and also competed in the similar weight category at the 2014 and 2015 World Weightlifting Championships.

== Major results ==
| Year | Venue | Weight | Snatch (kg) | | | | Clean & Jerk (kg) | | | | Total | Rank |
| Year | Venue | Weight | 1 | 2 | 3 | Rank | 1 | 2 | 3 | Rank | Total | Rank |
World Championships
| 2015 | Houston, United States | 69 kg | 130 | 134 | 136 | 26 | 160 | ~~168~~ | 169 | 22 | 305 | 22 |
| 2014 | Almaty, Kazakhstan | 69 kg | 126 | ~~130~~ | ~~130~~ | 31 | ~~152~~ | ~~152~~ | ~~152~~ | --- | 0 | --- |
