= Tairat Bunsuk =

Thai weightlifter (born 1993)

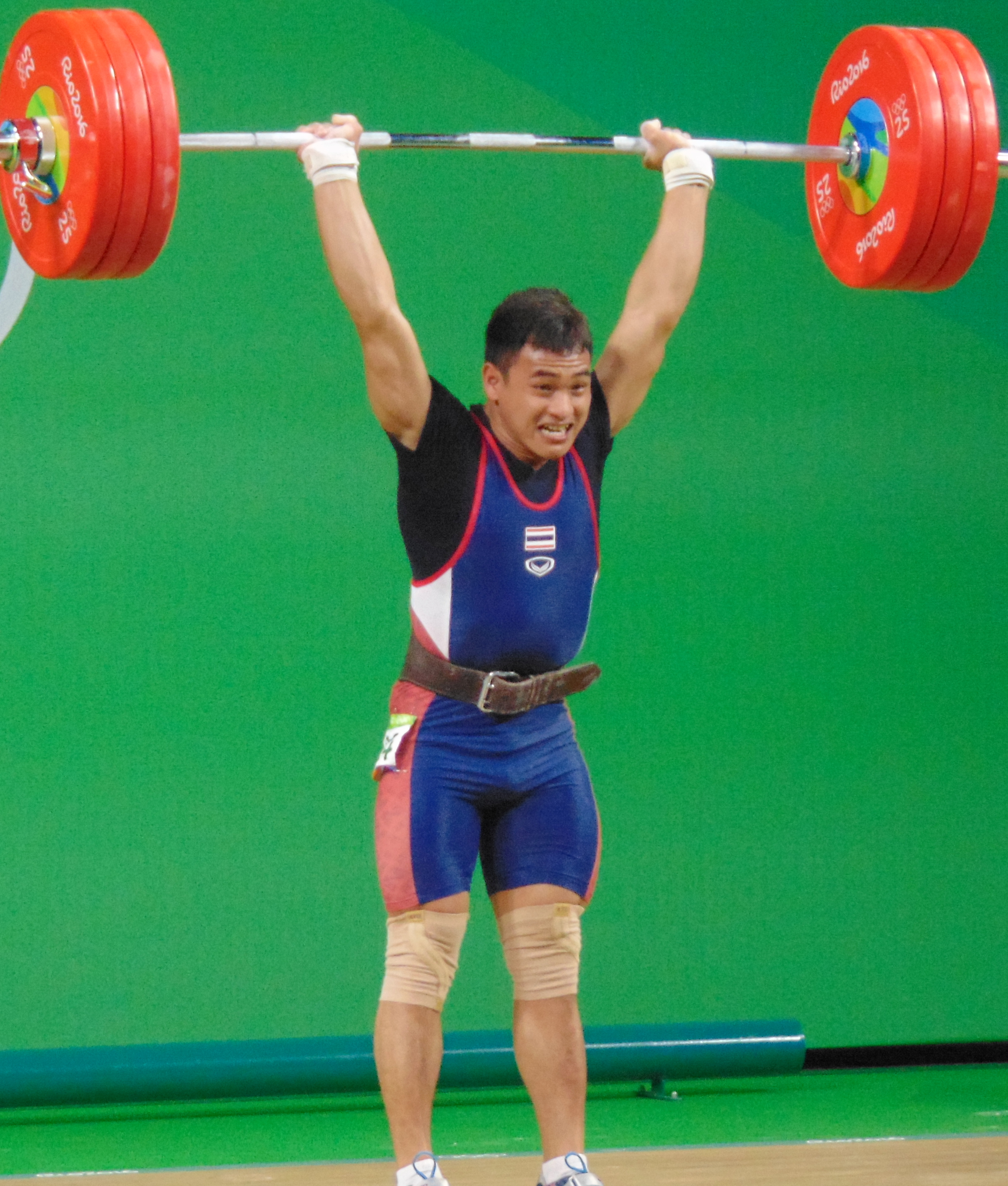
- Bunsuk at the 2016 Summer Olympics

Personal information
- Nationality: Thai
- Born: 11 January 1993 (age 33) Chiang Mai, Thailand
- Height: 1.61 m (5 ft 3 in)
- Weight: 69 kg (152 lb)

Sport
- Country: Thailand
- Sport: Weightlifting
Medal record
World Championships
Silver medal – second place	2017 Anaheim	–69 kg

Tairat Bunsuk (born 11 January 1993) is a Thai Olympic weightlifter. He represented his country at the 2014 and 2015 world championships and 2016 Summer Olympics.

== Major results ==
Year	Venue	Weight	Snatch (kg)				Clean & Jerk (kg)				Total	Rank
Year	Venue	Weight	1	2	3	Rank	1	2	3	Rank	Total	Rank
World Championships
2015	Houston, United States	69 kg	~~136~~	136	~~141~~	25	~~170~~	170	174	14	310	17
2014	Almaty, Kazakhstan	69 kg	~~137~~	137	~~141~~	20	168	171	176	9	313	13
