= Mahmoud Al-Humayd =

Saudi Arabian weightlifter (born 1993)

Personal information
- Born: 5 September 1993 (age 33)

Sport
- Country: Saudi Arabia
- Sport: Weightlifting
Medal record
Men's weightlifting
Representing Saudi Arabia
Asian Indoor and Martial Arts Games
Bronze medal – third place	2017 Ashgabat	–69 kg

Mahmoud Al-Humayd (Arabic: محمود آل حميد; born 5 September 1993) is a Saudi Arabian weightlifter. In 2021, he represented Saudi Arabia at the 2020 Summer Olympics in Tokyo, Japan. He competed in the men's 73 kg event.

At the 2017 Asian Indoor and Martial Arts Games held in Ashgabat, Turkmenistan, he won the bronze medal in the men's 69 kg event.

In 2018, he competed in the men's 69 kg event at the Asian Games held in Jakarta, Indonesia.
