= I Ketut Ariana =

Indonesian weightlifter (born 1989)

Personal information
- Born: 6 September 1989 (age 36) Melaya, Jembrana, Bali, Indonesia
- Height: 167 cm (5 ft 6 in)
- Weight: 69 kg (152 lb)

Sport
- Country: Indonesia
- Sport: Weightlifting
Medal record
Men's Weightlifting
Representing Indonesia
Asian Championships
Silver medal – second place	2013 Astana	– 69 kg
Southeast Asian Games
Gold medal – first place	2017 Kuala Lumpur	– 77 kg

I Ketut Ariana (born 6 September 1989) is an Indonesian Olympic weightlifter. He represented his country at the 2016 Summer Olympics.
