= Kim Myong-hyok =

North Korean weightlifter (born 1990)

Personal information
- Born: 3 December 1990 (age 35) North Pyongan Province, North Korea
- Height: 1.64 m (5 ft 4 1/2 in)
- Weight: 69 kg (152 lb)

Sport
- Country: North Korea
- Sport: Weightlifting
- Event: 69 kg

Korean name
- Hangul: 김명혁
- RR: Gim Myeonghyeok
- MR: Kim Myŏnghyŏk

Achievements and titles
- Personal bests: Snatch: 160 kg (2014); Clean and jerk: 185 kg (2013); Total: 342 kg (2014)
Medal record
Men's weightlifting
Representing North Korea
Olympic Games
Bronze medal – third place	2012 London	-69 kg
World Championships
Bronze medal – third place	2013 Wrocław	–69 kg
Bronze medal – third place	2014 Almaty	–69 kg
Asian Games
Silver medal – second place	2014 Incheon	–69 kg
Asian Championships
Gold medal – first place	2015 Phuket	–69 kg

Kim Myong-hyok (Korean: 김명혁; pronounced [kim.mjʌŋ.ɦjʌk̚]; born 3 December 1990) is a North Korean weightlifter. A two-time World Championship bronze medalist, he also competed for North Korea at the 2012 Summer Olympics.
