= 2019 World Weightlifting Championships – Men's 67 kg =

The men's 67 kg competition at the 2019 World Weightlifting Championships was held on 19 and 20 September 2019.

== Schedule ==
Date	Time	Event
19 September 2019	10:00	Group C
20 September 2019	12:00	Group B
20 September 2019	17:55	Group A

== Medalists ==
Event	Gold		Silver		Bronze	
Snatch	Feng Lüdong (CHN)	153 kg	Daniyar İsmayilov (TUR)	150 kg	Chen Lijun (CHN)	150 kg
Clean & Jerk	Pak Jong-ju (PRK)	188 kg	Chen Lijun (CHN)	187 kg	Adkhamjon Ergashev (UZB)	182 kg
Total	Chen Lijun (CHN)	337 kg	Feng Lüdong (CHN)	333 kg	Pak Jong-ju (PRK)	330 kg

== Records ==
Prior to this competition, the existing world records were as follows.

World record	Snatch	Huang Minhao (CHN)	155 kg	Tokyo, Japan	6 July 2019
World record	Clean & Jerk	Chen Lijun (CHN)	185 kg	Ningbo, China	21 April 2019
World record	Total	Chen Lijun (CHN)	339 kg	Ningbo, China	21 April 2019

== Results ==
Rank	Athlete	Group	Snatch (kg)				Clean & Jerk (kg)				Total
Rank	Athlete	Group	1	2	3	Rank	1	2	3	Rank	Total
1st place, gold medalist(s)	Chen Lijun (CHN)	A	145	150	~~153~~	3rd place, bronze medalist(s)	178	184	187 WR	2nd place, silver medalist(s)	337
2nd place, silver medalist(s)	Feng Lüdong (CHN)	B	148	153	~~156~~	1st place, gold medalist(s)	175	180	~~183~~	4	333
3rd place, bronze medalist(s)	Pak Jong-ju (PRK)	A	142	~~146~~	~~146~~	9	178	184	188 WR	1st place, gold medalist(s)	330
4	Adkhamjon Ergashev (UZB)	A	143 JWR	146 JWR	~~151~~	4	173	179 JWR	182 CJWR	3rd place, bronze medalist(s)	328 CJWR
5	Luis Javier Mosquera (COL)	A	145	~~151~~	~~151~~	5	~~175~~	175	~~181~~	6	320
6	Mitsunori Konnai (JPN)	A	138	143	~~146~~	6	168	~~173~~	174	8	317
7	Daniyar İsmayilov (TUR)	A	150	~~154~~	~~154~~	2nd place, silver medalist(s)	166	~~172~~	~~172~~	17	316
8	Henadz Laptseu (BLR)	A	137	142	~~144~~	10	~~165~~	165	171	11	313
9	Bernardin Matam (FRA)	A	135	~~138~~	138	15	170	173	175	7	313
10	Óscar Figueroa (COL)	A	137	~~140~~	~~140~~	17	176	~~181~~	~~181~~	5	313
11	Jonathan Muñoz (MEX)	B	133	138	142	7	165	~~170~~	170	13	312
12	Deni (INA)	B	~~135~~	138	141	11	165	171	~~174~~	9	312
13	Mirko Zanni (ITA)	A	140	~~145~~	~~145~~	12	165	170	~~173~~	14	310
14	Muhammed Furkan Özbek (TUR)	A	138	~~141~~	~~141~~	14	171	~~174~~	~~174~~	10	309
15	Goga Chkheidze (GEO)	B	~~133~~	133	137	16	162	166	170	12	307
16	Han Myeong-mok (KOR)	B	~~142~~	~~142~~	142	8	162	~~168~~	~~168~~	23	304
17	Simon Brandhuber (GER)	B	138	~~142~~	~~142~~	13	158	~~163~~	163	22	301
18	Acorán Hernández (ESP)	C	130	134	~~137~~	19	155	160	163	21	297
19	Edgar Pineda (GUA)	C	127	~~132~~	132	24	160	165	~~170~~	18	297
20	Nawaf Al-Mazyadi (KSA)	B	125	130	~~132~~	25	160	165	167	15	297
21	Jeremy Lalrinnunga (IND)	B	132	136	~~139~~	18	160	~~165~~	~~167~~	25	296
22	Tojonirina Andriantsitohaina (MAD)	C	125	~~131~~	132	23	155	163	~~168~~	20	295
23	Alex Lee (USA)	B	125	128	130	26	158	163	165	19	295
24	Bunýad Raşidow (TKM)	C	~~133~~	134	~~138~~	20	151	156	~~161~~	28	290
25	Luis Bardalez (PER)	B	123	~~127~~	~~127~~	31	160	163	166	16	289
26	Petr Petrov (CZE)	C	128	~~132~~	~~132~~	27	~~158~~	~~158~~	158	26	286
27	Jordan Wissinger (USA)	B	~~126~~	~~126~~	126	28	157	~~161~~	~~161~~	27	283
28	Vaipava Ioane (SAM)	C	121	~~125~~	~~125~~	32	161	~~165~~	—	24	282
29	Nestor Colonia (PHI)	C	120	125	~~130~~	29	140	150	155	29	280
30	Hu Jyun-siang (TPE)	C	112	116	~~120~~	35	~~150~~	150	155	30	271
31	Huang Pin-hsun (TPE)	C	~~117~~	117	~~123~~	34	150	~~155~~	~~155~~	32	267
32	Matt Lee (CAN)	C	115	~~119~~	~~120~~	36	~~145~~	145	~~150~~	33	260
33	Yusoff Nandong (MAS)	C	110	115	119	33	140	~~145~~	~~145~~	35	259
34	Haroon Siraj (GBR)	C	110	~~115~~	~~115~~	38	137	~~143~~	~~143~~	36	247
35	Hiroaki Takao (JPN)	C	103	108	111	37	126	130	135	37	246
—	Jorge Cárdenas (MEX)	B	133	~~137~~	~~137~~	21	~~163~~	~~163~~	~~163~~	—	—
—	Stilyan Grozdev (BUL)	B	133	~~135~~	~~135~~	22	~~165~~	~~165~~	~~166~~	—	—
—	Ruben Katoatau (KIR)	C	120	124	~~127~~	30	~~161~~	~~161~~	~~161~~	—	—
—	Ahssan Shabi (LBA)	C	~~126~~	~~126~~	~~126~~	—	145	153	~~157~~	31	—
—	Enkhjargalyn Mönkhdöl (MGL)	C	~~120~~	~~120~~	~~124~~	—	141	~~146~~	~~146~~	34	—

== New records ==
Clean & Jerk	187 kg	Chen Lijun (CHN)	WR
Clean & Jerk	188 kg	Pak Jong-ju (PRK)	WR
