= 2018 World Weightlifting Championships – Men's 67 kg =

Men's competition

The men's 67 kilograms competition at the 2018 World Weightlifting Championships was held on 2–4 November 2018.

== Schedule ==
| Date | Time | Event |
|---|---|---|
| 2 November 2018 | 08:00 | Group C |
| 3 November 2018 | 10:00 | Group B |
| 4 November 2018 | 14:25 | Group A |

== Medalists ==
| Event | Gold | | Silver | | Bronze | |
|---|---|---|---|---|---|---|
| Snatch | Huang Minhao (CHN) | 152 kg | Chen Lijun (CHN) | 150 kg | Julio Mayora (VEN) | 147 kg |
| Clean & Jerk | Chen Lijun (CHN) | 182 kg | Doston Yokubov (UZB) | 180 kg | Óscar Figueroa (COL) | 178 kg |
| Total | Chen Lijun (CHN) | 332 kg | Huang Minhao (CHN) | 323 kg | Julio Mayora (VEN) | 322 kg |

== Records ==
Prior to this competition, the existing world records were as follows.

| World Record | Snatch | World Standard | 153 kg | — | 1 November 2018 |
| World Record | Clean & Jerk | World Standard | 184 kg | — | 1 November 2018 |
| World Record | Total | World Standard | 331 kg | — | 1 November 2018 |

== Results ==
| Rank | Athlete | Group | Snatch (kg) | | | | Clean & Jerk (kg) | | | | Total |
| Rank | Athlete | Group | 1 | 2 | 3 | Rank | 1 | 2 | 3 | Rank | Total |
|---|---|---|---|---|---|---|---|---|---|---|---|
| 1st place, gold medalist(s) | Chen Lijun (CHN) | A | 145 | 150 | ~~153~~ | 2nd place, silver medalist(s) | 178 | 182 | ~~185~~ | 1st place, gold medalist(s) | 332 |
| 2nd place, silver medalist(s) | Huang Minhao (CHN) | A | 148 | 152 | ~~154~~ | 1st place, gold medalist(s) | 166 | 171 | ~~175~~ | 9 | 323 |
| 3rd place, bronze medalist(s) | Julio Mayora (VEN) | A | 144 | 147 | ~~151~~ | 3rd place, bronze medalist(s) | 175 | ~~178~~ | ~~179~~ | 5 | 322 |
| 4 | Doston Yokubov (UZB) | A | 135 | ~~139~~ | 139 | 12 | 177 | 180 | ~~184~~ | 2nd place, silver medalist(s) | 319 |
| 5 | Óscar Figueroa (COL) | A | 140 | ~~145~~ | ~~145~~ | 8 | ~~176~~ | 178 | ~~181~~ | 3rd place, bronze medalist(s) | 318 |
| 6 | Pak Jong-ju (PRK) | A | ~~140~~ | 140 | ~~144~~ | 10 | 175 | ~~180~~ | ~~181~~ | 6 | 315 |
| 7 | Goga Chkheidze (GEO) | B | 132 | 136 | 139 | 11 | 164 | 168 | 172 | 8 | 311 |
| 8 | Deni (INA) | A | 135 | 140 | ~~145~~ | 9 | ~~170~~ | 170 | ~~175~~ | 10 | 310 |
| 9 | Farkhad Kharki (KAZ) | B | 126 | 131 | 133 | 19 | 166 | 171 | 175 | 4 | 308 |
| 10 | Bernardin Matam (FRA) | A | 134 | ~~137~~ | ~~137~~ | 18 | ~~168~~ | 168 | 173 | 7 | 307 |
| 11 | Simon Brandhuber (GER) | B | 138 | 142 | 146 | 4 | 155 | 160 | ~~164~~ | 17 | 306 |
| 12 | Mirko Zanni (ITA) | B | 137 | 140 | ~~143~~ | 6 | 160 | 165 | ~~169~~ | 13 | 305 |
| 13 | Mitsunori Konnai (JPN) | B | 132 | 136 | ~~139~~ | 14 | 163 | ~~167~~ | 167 | 11 | 303 |
| 14 | Stilyan Grozdev (BUL) | B | 130 | 133 | 135 | 16 | 162 | 165 | — | 14 | 300 |
| 15 | Feliks Khalibekov (RUS) | B | 133 | 138 | ~~141~~ | 13 | 155 | 160 | ~~164~~ | 16 | 298 |
| 16 | Víctor Castro (ESP) | C | ~~132~~ | 132 | 135 | 15 | 155 | ~~158~~ | 158 | 18 | 293 |
| 17 | Alex Lee (USA) | B | 127 | ~~130~~ | ~~131~~ | 21 | 165 | ~~170~~ | ~~170~~ | 12 | 292 |
| 18 | Hurşit Atak (TUR) | B | 126 | ~~129~~ | ~~130~~ | 22 | ~~163~~ | 163 | ~~170~~ | 15 | 289 |
| 19 | Acorán Hernández (ESP) | C | 130 | ~~134~~ | 134 | 17 | 153 | ~~157~~ | ~~157~~ | 20 | 287 |
| 20 | Luis Bardalez (PER) | C | 120 | 123 | 125 | 23 | 155 | ~~158~~ | ~~160~~ | 19 | 280 |
| 21 | Jeffrey Garcia (PHI) | C | 120 | ~~125~~ | ~~125~~ | 25 | ~~150~~ | ~~150~~ | 150 | 22 | 270 |
| 22 | Jettarin Sriram (THA) | C | 113 | 117 | 119 | 26 | 140 | 145 | 150 | 21 | 269 |
| 23 | Nawaf Al-Mazyadi (KSA) | C | 111 | ~~117~~ | 117 | 27 | 146 | ~~154~~ | ~~154~~ | 23 | 263 |
| 24 | Kanan Khalilov (AZE) | C | 120 | ~~125~~ | ~~125~~ | 24 | ~~135~~ | ~~135~~ | 135 | 26 | 255 |
| 25 | Rustam Gasimov (AZE) | C | 110 | ~~115~~ | ~~115~~ | 28 | 135 | — | — | 25 | 245 |
| — | Jonathan Muñoz (MEX) | A | 133 | 138 | 141 | 5 | ~~166~~ | ~~166~~ | ~~166~~ | — | — |
| — | Lee Sang-yeon (KOR) | A | 140 | ~~144~~ | ~~144~~ | 7 | ~~170~~ | ~~170~~ | ~~170~~ | — | — |
| — | Jordan Wissinger (USA) | B | 126 | 129 | ~~132~~ | 20 | ~~155~~ | ~~155~~ | ~~155~~ | — | — |
| — | Abdelkader Ainouazane (ALG) | C | ~~115~~ | ~~115~~ | ~~115~~ | — | 135 | ~~140~~ | 140 | 24 | — |
| DQ | Witsanu Chantri (THA) | A | 131 | ~~134~~ | ~~134~~ | — | ~~165~~ | ~~165~~ | 165 | — | — |

== New records ==
| Total | 332 kg | Chen Lijun (CHN) | WR |
