= 2017 World Weightlifting Championships – Men's 62 kg =

The Men's 62 kg competition at the 2017 World Weightlifting Championships was held on 29 November 2017.

== Schedule ==
| Date | Time | Event |
|---|---|---|
| 28 November 2017 | 17:25 | Group B |
| 29 November 2017 | 19:55 | Group A |

== Medalists ==
| Event | Gold | | Silver | | Bronze | |
|---|---|---|---|---|---|---|
| Snatch | Trịnh Văn Vinh (VIE) | 136 kg | Han Myeong-mok (KOR) | 135 kg | Adkhamjon Ergashev (UZB) | 135 kg |
| Clean & Jerk | Francisco Mosquera (COL) | 170 kg | José Montes (MEX) | 167 kg | Antonio Vázquez (MEX) | 165 kg |
| Total | Francisco Mosquera (COL) | 300 kg | Yoichi Itokazu (JPN) | 299 kg | Shota Mishvelidze (GEO) | 298 kg |

== Records ==
Prior to this competition, the existing world records were as follows.

| World Record | Snatch | Kim Un-guk (PRK) | 154 kg | Incheon, South Korea | 21 September 2014 |
| World Record | Clean & Jerk | Chen Lijun (CHN) | 183 kg | Houston, United States | 22 November 2015 |
| World Record | Total | Chen Lijun (CHN) | 333 kg | Houston, United States | 22 November 2015 |

== Results ==
| Rank | Athlete | Group | Snatch (kg) | | | | Clean & Jerk (kg) | | | | Total |
| Rank | Athlete | Group | 1 | 2 | 3 | Rank | 1 | 2 | 3 | Rank | Total |
|---|---|---|---|---|---|---|---|---|---|---|---|
| 1st place, gold medalist(s) | Francisco Mosquera (COL) | A | 130 | ~~135~~ | ~~136~~ | 6 | 166 | 170 | ~~172~~ | 1st place, gold medalist(s) | 300 |
| 2nd place, silver medalist(s) | Yoichi Itokazu (JPN) | A | ~~130~~ | 130 | 134 | 5 | 161 | 165 | ~~170~~ | 4 | 299 |
| 3rd place, bronze medalist(s) | Shota Mishvelidze (GEO) | A | ~~130~~ | 130 | 135 | 4 | 148 | 157 | 163 | 5 | 298 |
| 4 | Adkhamjon Ergashev (UZB) | A | ~~129~~ | 129 | 135 | 3rd place, bronze medalist(s) | ~~157~~ | 157 | ~~164~~ | 8 | 292 |
| 5 | Antonio Vázquez (MEX) | A | ~~122~~ | 122 | 126 | 8 | 165 | ~~170~~ | ~~170~~ | 3rd place, bronze medalist(s) | 291 |
| 6 | José Montes (MEX) | A | 122 | ~~126~~ | ~~126~~ | 12 | 163 | 167 | ~~171~~ | 2nd place, silver medalist(s) | 289 |
| 7 | Han Myeong-mok (KOR) | A | ~~135~~ | 135 | ~~137~~ | 2nd place, silver medalist(s) | ~~153~~ | 153 | ~~160~~ | 10 | 288 |
| 8 | Hiroaki Takao (JPN) | B | 122 | ~~126~~ | 126 | 9 | ~~152~~ | 152 | 160 | 6 | 286 |
| 9 | Kao Chan-hung (TPE) | B | 125 | ~~130~~ | 130 | 7 | 150 | 155 | ~~160~~ | 9 | 285 |
| 10 | Ahmed Saad (EGY) | A | ~~126~~ | ~~126~~ | 126 | 10 | 158 | ~~162~~ | ~~163~~ | 7 | 284 |
| 11 | Vladimir Urumov (BUL) | A | ~~125~~ | 125 | ~~129~~ | 11 | 150 | ~~161~~ | ~~162~~ | 11 | 275 |
| 12 | Cristhian Zurita (ECU) | B | 118 | 122 | ~~125~~ | 13 | 145 | ~~148~~ | 148 | 13 | 270 |
| 13 | Lại Gia Thành (VIE) | B | 115 | 118 | ~~120~~ | 15 | 146 | 149 | ~~153~~ | 12 | 267 |
| 14 | Faisal Al-Sulami (KSA) | B | 111 | ~~116~~ | ~~116~~ | 16 | 136 | 140 | ~~143~~ | 15 | 251 |
| — | Trịnh Văn Vinh (VIE) | A | 130 | 134 | 136 | 1st place, gold medalist(s) | ~~165~~ | ~~165~~ | ~~166~~ | — | — |
| — | Abbas Al-Abdulal (KSA) | B | ~~117~~ | 117 | 120 | 14 | ~~144~~ | ~~144~~ | ~~145~~ | — | — |
| — | Patiphan Bupphamala (THA) | B | ~~115~~ | ~~115~~ | ~~115~~ | — | ~~140~~ | 140 | 147 | 14 | — |
| DQ | Dimitris Minasidis (CYP) | A | 126 | 131 | ~~135~~ | — | ~~152~~ | ~~153~~ | 153 | — | — |
