= 2023 Asian Weightlifting Championships =

Weightlifting event in South Korea

- Host city: Jinju, South Korea
- Events: 20 (10 men's and 10 women's)
- Dates: 5–13 May
- Main venue: Jinju Arena (Weightlifting Hall)
- Website: http://en.2023jawc.org/

The 2023 Asian Weightlifting Championships was held in Jinju, South Gyeongsang Province, South Korea from 5 to 13 May 2023.

== Doping ==
These are from Kazakhstan who tested positive:

1. Arli Chontey 55 kg Men Rank 3
2. Nurgissa Adiletuly 102 kg Men Rank 1
3. Artyom Antropov 109 kg Men Rank 2
4. Andas Samarkanov 109 kg Men Rank 3
5. Lyubov Kovalchuk +87 kg Women Rank 4

NOC	Gold	Silver	Bronze	Total
Kazakhstan	−3	−3	−3	−9
South Korea	+2	-1	−1	0
Vietnam	+1	-1	+1	+1
Iran	0	+1	+2	+3
Iraq	0	+1	+1	+2
Saudi Arabia	0	+1	0	+1
Chinese Taipei	0	+1	0	+1
Kyrgyzstan	0	+1	-1	0
Turkmenistan	0	0	+1	+1

== Medal summary ==
Men

Event	Gold		Silver		Bronze	
55 kg
Snatch		117 kg	Ngô Sơn Đỉnh; Vietnam	117 kg	Mansour Al-Saleem; Saudi Arabia	116 kg
Clean & Jerk	Đỗ Tú Tùng; Vietnam	147 kg	Ngô Sơn Đỉnh; Vietnam	143 kg	Mansour Al-Saleem; Saudi Arabia	141 kg
Total	Đỗ Tú Tùng; Vietnam	263 kg	Ngô Sơn Đỉnh; Vietnam	260 kg		258 kg
61 kg
Snatch	Li Fabin; China	143 kg	Chen Lijun; China	142 kg	Ricko Saputra; Indonesia	133 kg
Clean & Jerk	Li Fabin; China	171 kg	Chen Lijun; China	168 kg	Theerapong Silachai; Thailand	167 kg WJR
Total	Li Fabin; China	314 kg	Chen Lijun; China	310 kg	Theerapong Silachai; Thailand	299 kg WJR
67 kg
Snatch	He Yueji; China	147 kg	Jeremy Lalrinnunga; India	141 kg	Bunýad Raşidow; Turkmenistan	140 kg
Clean & Jerk	Lee Sang-yeon; South Korea	175 kg	Adkhamjon Ergashev; Uzbekistan	174 kg	He Yueji; China	173 kg
Total	He Yueji; China	320 kg	Lee Sang-yeon; South Korea	314 kg	Adkhamjon Ergashev; Uzbekistan	312 kg
73 kg
Snatch	Wei Yinting; China	155 kg	Alexey Churkin; Kazakhstan	154 kg	Masanori Miyamoto; Japan	153 kg
Clean & Jerk	Weeraphon Wichuma; Thailand	192 kg	Bak Joo-hyo; South Korea	191 kg	Masanori Miyamoto; Japan	191 kg
Total	Masanori Miyamoto; Japan	344 kg	Weeraphon Wichuma; Thailand	342 kg	Alexey Churkin; Kazakhstan	340 kg
81 kg
Snatch	Yelaman Seitkazy; Kazakhstan	155 kg	Hossein Soltani; Iran	154 kg	Chuang Sheng-min; Chinese Taipei	154 kg
Clean & Jerk	Hossein Soltani; Iran	184 kg	Park Hyeon-go; South Korea	181 kg	Chuang Sheng-min; Chinese Taipei	180 kg
Total	Hossein Soltani; Iran	338 kg	Chuang Sheng-min; Chinese Taipei	334 kg	Park Hyeon-go; South Korea	324 kg
89 kg
Snatch	Li Dayin; China	180 kg WR	Emil Moldodosov; Kyrgyzstan	166 kg	Tian Tao; China	165 kg
Clean & Jerk	Tian Tao; China	222 kg WR	Li Dayin; China	216 kg	Mirmostafa Javadi; Iran	205 kg
Total	Li Dayin; China	396 kg WR	Tian Tao; China	387 kg	Mirmostafa Javadi; Iran	364 kg
96 kg
Snatch	Liu Huanhua; China	175 kg	Sarat Sumpradit; Thailand	173 kg	Won Jong-beom; South Korea	171 kg
Clean & Jerk	Won Jong-beom; South Korea	211 kg	Liu Huanhua; China	210 kg	Sarat Sumpradit; Thailand	207 kg
Total	Liu Huanhua; China	385 kg	Won Jong-beom; South Korea	382 kg	Sarat Sumpradit; Thailand	380 kg
102 kg
Snatch	Jang Yeon-hak; South Korea	182 kg		181 kg	Chen Po-jen; Chinese Taipei	181 kg
Clean & Jerk		219 kg	Jin Yun-seong; South Korea	218 kg	Bekdoolot Rasulbekov; Kyrgyzstan	217 kg
Total		400 kg	Jin Yun-seong; South Korea	398 kg	Jang Yeon-hak; South Korea	392 kg
109 kg
Snatch	Ammar Rubaiawi; Iraq	178 kg	Ruslan Nurudinov; Uzbekistan	177 kg	Mehdi Karami; Iran	173 kg
Clean & Jerk	Ruslan Nurudinov; Uzbekistan	228 kg		227 kg		221 kg
Total	Ruslan Nurudinov; Uzbekistan	405 kg		399 kg	Mehdi Karami; Iran	390 kg
109+ kg
Snatch	Gor Minasyan; Bahrain	217 kg AR	Ayat Sharifi; Iran	197 kg	Rustam Djangabaev; Uzbekistan	196 kg
Clean & Jerk	Gor Minasyan; Bahrain	247 kg	Alireza Yousefi; Iran	246 kg WJR	Akbar Djuraev; Uzbekistan	242 kg
Total	Gor Minasyan; Bahrain	464 kg AR	Rustam Djangabaev; Uzbekistan	437 kg	Akbar Djuraev; Uzbekistan	437 kg

Women

Event	Gold		Silver		Bronze	
45 kg
Snatch	Chayuttra Pramongkhol; Thailand	77 kg	Rose Jean Ramos; Philippines	73 kg	Siti Nafisatul Hariroh; Indonesia	71 kg
Clean & Jerk	Chayuttra Pramongkhol; Thailand	100 kg	Rose Jean Ramos; Philippines	88 kg	Siti Nafisatul Hariroh; Indonesia	88 kg
Total	Chayuttra Pramongkhol; Thailand	177 kg	Rose Jean Ramos; Philippines	161 kg	Siti Nafisatul Hariroh; Indonesia	159 kg
49 kg
Snatch	Jiang Huihua; China	94 kg	Hou Zhihui; China	93 kg	Thanyathon Sukcharoen; Thailand	90 kg
Clean & Jerk	Jiang Huihua; China	113 kg	Rira Suzuki; Japan	111 kg	Hou Zhihui; China	111 kg
Total	Jiang Huihua; China	207 kg	Hou Zhihui; China	204 kg	Surodchana Khambao; Thailand	200 kg
55 kg
Snatch	Chen Guan-ling; Chinese Taipei	90 kg	Võ Thị Quỳnh Như; Vietnam	88 kg	Jamila Panfilova; Uzbekistan	86 kg
Clean & Jerk	Chen Guan-ling; Chinese Taipei	114 kg	Bindyarani Devi; India	111 kg	Jamila Panfilova; Uzbekistan	105 kg
Total	Chen Guan-ling; Chinese Taipei	204 kg	Bindyarani Devi; India	194 kg	Võ Thị Quỳnh Như; Vietnam	192 kg
59 kg
Snatch	Luo Shifang; China	105 kg	Pei Xinyi; China	103 kg	Kuo Hsing-chun; Chinese Taipei	102 kg
Clean & Jerk	Pei Xinyi; China	133 kg WJR	Luo Shifang; China	133 kg	Kuo Hsing-chun; Chinese Taipei	128 kg
Total	Luo Shifang; China	238 kg	Pei Xinyi; China	236 kg WJR	Kuo Hsing-chun; Chinese Taipei	230 kg
64 kg
Snatch	Ganzorigiin Anuujin; Mongolia	93 kg	Karina Goricheva; Kazakhstan	91 kg	Medine Amanowa; Turkmenistan	90 kg
Clean & Jerk	Ganzorigiin Anuujin; Mongolia	118 kg	Medine Amanowa; Turkmenistan	117 kg	Fatemeh Keshavarz; Iran	109 kg
Total	Ganzorigiin Anuujin; Mongolia	211 kg	Medine Amanowa; Turkmenistan	207 kg	Fatemeh Keshavarz; Iran	194 kg
71 kg
Snatch	Liao Guifang; China	120 kg WR	Vanessa Sarno; Philippines	107 kg	Phạm Thị Hồng Thanh; Vietnam	103 kg
Clean & Jerk	Liao Guifang; China	148 kg	Vanessa Sarno; Philippines	132 kg	Chen Wen-huei; Chinese Taipei	131 kg
Total	Liao Guifang; China	268 kg WR	Vanessa Sarno; Philippines	239 kg	Chen Wen-huei; Chinese Taipei	232 kg
76 kg
Snatch	Siriyakorn Khaipandung; Thailand	110 kg	Kim Su-hyeon; South Korea	109 kg	Lee Min-ji; South Korea	100 kg
Clean & Jerk	Kim Su-hyeon; South Korea	134 kg	Lee Min-ji; South Korea	128 kg	Siriyakorn Khaipandung; Thailand	127 kg
Total	Kim Su-hyeon; South Korea	243 kg	Siriyakorn Khaipandung; Thailand	237 kg	Lee Min-ji; South Korea	228 kg
81 kg
Snatch	Liang Xiaomei; China	120 kg	Wang Zhouyu; China	115 kg	Mönkhjantsangiin Ankhtsetseg; Mongolia	108 kg
Clean & Jerk	Liang Xiaomei; China	155 kg	Wang Zhouyu; China	146 kg	Mönkhjantsangiin Ankhtsetseg; Mongolia	135 kg
Total	Liang Xiaomei; China	275 kg	Wang Zhouyu; China	261 kg	Mönkhjantsangiin Ankhtsetseg; Mongolia	243 kg
87 kg
Snatch	Lo Ying-yuan; Chinese Taipei	110 kg	Rigina Adashbaeva; Uzbekistan	103 kg	Anamjan Rustamowa; Turkmenistan	102 kg
Clean & Jerk	Yun Ha-je; South Korea	132 kg	Lo Ying-yuan; Chinese Taipei	131 kg	Aisha Omarova; Kazakhstan	127 kg
Total	Lo Ying-yuan; Chinese Taipei	241 kg	Yun Ha-je; South Korea	231 kg	Rigina Adashbaeva; Uzbekistan	230 kg
87+ kg
Snatch	Li Wenwen; China	140 kg	Park Hye-jeong; South Korea	127 kg	Son Young-hee; South Korea	120 kg
Clean & Jerk	Li Wenwen; China	175 kg	Son Young-hee; South Korea	169 kg	Park Hye-jeong; South Korea	168 kg
Total	Li Wenwen; China	315 kg	Park Hye-jeong; South Korea	295 kg	Son Young-hee; South Korea	289 kg

== Medal table ==
Ranking by Big (Total result) medals

* Host nation (South Korea)

Rank	Nation	Gold	Silver	Bronze	Total
1	China	9	5	0	14
2	South Korea*	2	5	3	10
3	Chinese Taipei	2	1	3	6
4	Thailand	1	2	3	6
5	Uzbekistan	1	1	3	5
6	Vietnam	1	1	1	3
7	Iran	1	0	3	4
8	Mongolia	1	0	1	2
9	Bahrain	1	0	0	1
9	Japan	1	0	0	1
11	Philippines	0	2	0	2
12	India	0	1	0	1
12	Iraq	0	1	0	1
12	Turkmenistan	0	1	0	1
15	Indonesia	0	0	1	1
15	Kazakhstan	0	0	1	1
15	Saudi Arabia	0	0	1	1
Totals (17 entries)		20	20	20	60

Ranking by all medals: Big (Total result) and Small (Snatch and Clean & Jerk)

* Host nation (South Korea)

Rank	Nation	Gold	Silver	Bronze	Total
1	China	26	14	3	43
2	South Korea*	8	11	7	26
3	Chinese Taipei	5	3	8	16
4	Thailand	5	3	7	15
5	Vietnam	3	3	3	9
6	Mongolia	3	0	3	6
7	Bahrain	3	0	0	3
8	Iran	2	4	7	13
8	Uzbekistan	2	4	7	13
10	Kazakhstan	1	2	2	5
11	Japan	1	1	2	4
12	Iraq	1	1	1	3
13	Philippines	0	6	0	6
14	India	0	3	0	3
15	Turkmenistan	0	2	4	6
16	Kyrgyzstan	0	2	0	2
17	Saudi Arabia	0	1	2	3
18	Indonesia	0	0	4	4
Totals (18 entries)		60	60	60	180

== Team ranking ==
=== Men ===
Rank	Team	Points
1	Iran	635
2	Uzbekistan	631
3	China	608
4	South Korea	579
5	Chinese Taipei	529
6	Japan	383

=== Women ===
Rank	Team	Points
1	China	708
2	Chinese Taipei	645
3	South Korea	630
4	Kazakhstan	526
5	Japan	507
6	Thailand	412

== Participating nations ==
A total of 235 competitors from 33 nations participated.

- Bahrain (2)
- Bangladesh (3)
- China (18)
- Chinese Taipei (20)
- India (6)
- Indonesia (7)
- Iran (15)
- Iraq (3)
- Japan (17)
- Jordan (1)
- Kazakhstan (20)
- Kuwait (3)
- Kyrgyzstan (4)
- Laos (1)
- Lebanon (1)
- Malaysia (2)
- Mongolia (10)
- Nepal (1)
- Oman (2)
- Philippines (8)
- Qatar (1)
- Saudi Arabia (3)
- Singapore (4)
- South Korea (20) Host
- Sri Lanka (2)
- Syria (1)
- Tajikistan (3)
- Thailand (14)
- Turkmenistan (16)
- United Arab Emirates (1)
- Uzbekistan (14)
- Vietnam (10)
- Yemen (2)

== Men's results ==
=== 55 kg ===
Rank	Athlete	Group	Snatch (kg)				Clean & Jerk (kg)				Total
Rank	Athlete	Group	1	2	3	Rank	1	2	3	Rank	Total
1st place, gold medalist(s)	Đỗ Tú Tùng (VIE)	A	~~115~~	~~116~~	116	4	142	145	147	1st place, gold medalist(s)	263
2nd place, silver medalist(s)	Ngô Sơn Đỉnh (VIE)	A	115	~~117~~	117	2nd place, silver medalist(s)	141	143	~~146~~	2nd place, silver medalist(s)	260
3rd place, bronze medalist(s)	Arli Chontey (KAZ)	A	115	117	~~119~~	1st place, gold medalist(s)	~~140~~	~~140~~	141	4	258
4	Mansour Al-Saleem (KSA)	A	110	~~116~~	116	3rd place, bronze medalist(s)	~~135~~	135	141	3rd place, bronze medalist(s)	257
5	Satrio Nugroho (INA)	A	105	109	~~112~~	6	132	137	~~140~~	5	246
6	Og'abek Nafasov (UZB)	A	105	108	111	5	127	~~131~~	~~132~~	6	238
7	Md Ashikur Rahman Taj (BAN)	A	~~90~~	90	95	7	110	~~120~~	~~120~~	8	205
8	Tang Chun-yen (TPE)	A	~~85~~	85	~~89~~	8	115	~~118~~	~~118~~	7	200
9	Thy Nasod (LAO)	A	~~75~~	76	80	9	~~95~~	100	105	10	185
10	Anbar Basel (YEM)	A	~~75~~	75	~~82~~	10	95	102	106	9	181

=== 61 kg ===
Rank	Athlete	Group	Snatch (kg)				Clean & Jerk (kg)				Total
Rank	Athlete	Group	1	2	3	Rank	1	2	3	Rank	Total
1st place, gold medalist(s)	Li Fabin (CHN)	A	136	141	143	1st place, gold medalist(s)	166	171	~~174~~	1st place, gold medalist(s)	314
2nd place, silver medalist(s)	Chen Lijun (CHN)	A	137	~~142~~	142	2nd place, silver medalist(s)	168	~~173~~	~~173~~	2nd place, silver medalist(s)	310
3rd place, bronze medalist(s)	Theerapong Silachai (THA)	A	127	130	132	4	162	164	167	3rd place, bronze medalist(s)	299
4	Ricko Saputra (INA)	A	127	131	133	3rd place, bronze medalist(s)	161	165	~~168~~	5	298
5	John Ceniza (PHI)	B	125	128	~~131~~	5	160	165	~~168~~	4	293
6	Aniq Kasdan (MAS)	B	114	119	122	6	151	158	162	8	284
7	Kaito Hirai (JPN)	B	113	118	~~122~~	8	150	156	~~164~~	9	274
8	Otepbergen Aliyev (KAZ)	B	114	118	121	7	143	150	~~153~~	11	271
9	Yoichi Itokazu (JPN)	B	110	115	118	9	135	140	145	14	263
10	Shubham Todkar (IND)	B	~~116~~	116	~~119~~	10	143	147	~~150~~	12	263
11	Perhat Bagtyýarow (TKM)	B	~~112~~	112	115	11	140	145	~~147~~	13	260
12	Mӧnkhbayaryn Ochir-Erdene (MGL)	B	88	92	~~95~~	13	108	113	~~116~~	15	205
—	Dilanka Isuru Kumara (SRI)	B	~~105~~	105	~~112~~	12	—	—	—	—	—
—	Aznil Bidin (MAS)	A	~~127~~	~~128~~	~~128~~	—	157	163	~~166~~	6	—
—	Trịnh Văn Vinh (VIE)	A	~~128~~	~~128~~	~~128~~	—	~~162~~	163	~~167~~	7	—
—	Shin Rok (KOR)	A	~~127~~	~~127~~	~~127~~	—	~~155~~	155	~~166~~	10	—
—	Teerapat Chomchuen (THA)	A	~~130~~	—	—	—	~~161~~	—	—	—	—
—	Seýitjan Mirzaýew (TKM)	A	~~129~~	~~129~~	~~129~~	—	~~145~~	~~150~~	~~150~~	—	—

=== 67 kg ===
Rank	Athlete	Group	Snatch (kg)				Clean & Jerk (kg)				Total
Rank	Athlete	Group	1	2	3	Rank	1	2	3	Rank	Total
1st place, gold medalist(s)	He Yueji (CHN)	A	138	143	147	1st place, gold medalist(s)	167	173	~~177~~	3rd place, bronze medalist(s)	320
2nd place, silver medalist(s)	Lee Sang-yeon (KOR)	A	133	136	139	4	175	~~182~~	~~182~~	1st place, gold medalist(s)	314
3rd place, bronze medalist(s)	Adkhamjon Ergashev (UZB)	A	130	134	138	6	162	168	174	2nd place, silver medalist(s)	312
4	Ding Hongjie (CHN)	A	135	~~138~~	139	5	166	~~171~~	~~171~~	4	305
5	Bunýad Raşidow (TKM)	A	~~140~~	140	~~144~~	3rd place, bronze medalist(s)	158	162	~~166~~	5	302
6	Diyorbek Ruzmetov (UZB)	A	122	127	~~130~~	7	150	~~155~~	157	7	284
7	Elyas Al-Busaidi (OMA)	A	120	125	~~128~~	8	153	157	~~162~~	9	282
8	Liu Yung-fu (TPE)	A	120	~~124~~	~~126~~	9	150	156	~~159~~	8	276
9	Ishimbek Muratbek Uulu (KGZ)	A	115	~~120~~	~~122~~	10	~~155~~	155	~~160~~	9	270
10	Ulaantsetsegiin Amarbayar (MGL)	A	~~115~~	115	~~120~~	11	141	~~148~~	~~148~~	10	256
—	Jeremy Lalrinnunga (IND)	A	~~137~~	137	141	2nd place, silver medalist(s)	~~165~~	~~165~~	~~168~~	—	—
—	Seraj Al-Saleem (KSA)	A	—	—	—	—	—	—	—	—	—

=== 73 kg ===
Rank	Athlete	Group	Snatch (kg)				Clean & Jerk (kg)				Total
Rank	Athlete	Group	1	2	3	Rank	1	2	3	Rank	Total
1st place, gold medalist(s)	Masanori Miyamoto (JPN)	A	~~148~~	148	153	3rd place, bronze medalist(s)	186	~~191~~	191	3rd place, bronze medalist(s)	344
2nd place, silver medalist(s)	Weeraphon Wichuma (THA)	A	146	150	~~154~~	4	186	190	192	1st place, gold medalist(s)	342
3rd place, bronze medalist(s)	Alexey Churkin (KAZ)	A	146	151	154	2nd place, silver medalist(s)	186	~~191~~	~~191~~	4	340
4	Bak Joo-hyo (KOR)	A	146	149	~~152~~	6	186	~~190~~	191	2nd place, silver medalist(s)	340
5	Suttipong Jeeram (THA)	A	145	149	~~152~~	5	180	185	~~189~~	5	334
6	Wei Yinting (CHN)	A	150	~~155~~	155	1st place, gold medalist(s)	~~173~~	173	~~181~~	7	328
7	Doston Yokubov (UZB)	A	137	141	~~144~~	9	175	~~182~~	182	6	323
8	Bektimur Reýimow (TKM)	A	143	~~147~~	147	7	172	~~176~~	~~176~~	8	319
9	Narayana Ajith (IND)	B	135	139	~~141~~	11	164	168	~~171~~	9	307
10	Achinta Sheuli (IND)	B	136	~~140~~	140	10	165	~~169~~	~~171~~	10	305
11	Huang Pin-hsun (TPE)	B	~~135~~	135	138	12	161	~~166~~	~~166~~	12	299
12	Chen Wang-heng (TPE)	B	132	~~136~~	~~136~~	13	155	162	~~167~~	11	294
13	Izzat Artykov (KGZ)	B	120	125	130	15	150	160	~~165~~	13	290
14	Indika Dissanayake (SRI)	B	~~130~~	130	~~134~~	14	157	~~160~~	~~160~~	14	287
—	Jeong Han-sol (KOR)	A	143	~~147~~	~~147~~	8	~~187~~	~~187~~	~~188~~	—	—
—	Mitsunori Konnai (JPN)	A	~~140~~	—	—	—	—	—	—	—	—
—	Maksad Meredow (TKM)	A	~~140~~	~~140~~	~~142~~	—	—	—	—	—	—
—	Shi Zhiyong (CHN)	B	—	—	—	—	—	—	—	—	—

=== 81 kg ===
Rank	Athlete	Group	Snatch (kg)				Clean & Jerk (kg)				Total
Rank	Athlete	Group	1	2	3	Rank	1	2	3	Rank	Total
1st place, gold medalist(s)	Hossein Soltani (IRI)	A	149	154	~~157~~	2nd place, silver medalist(s)	184	~~195~~	~~196~~	1st place, gold medalist(s)	338
2nd place, silver medalist(s)	Chuang Sheng-min (TPE)	A	150	154	~~156~~	3rd place, bronze medalist(s)	180	—	—	3rd place, bronze medalist(s)	334
3rd place, bronze medalist(s)	Park Hyeon-go (KOR)	A	~~143~~	~~143~~	143	4	~~175~~	175	181	2nd place, silver medalist(s)	324
4	Otgonbayaryn Buyantogtokh (MGL)	A	105	~~110~~	~~110~~	6	130	~~138~~	~~138~~	4	235
5	Ilkhomjon Shukurov (TJK)	A	90	95	98	7	110	115	120	5	218
—	Yelaman Seitkazy (KAZ)	A	147	151	155	1st place, gold medalist(s)	~~183~~	~~183~~	~~183~~	—	—
—	Loh Yuan Yee (SGP)	A	136	~~143~~	~~145~~	5	~~160~~	~~160~~	~~165~~	—	—

=== 89 kg ===
Rank	Athlete	Group	Snatch (kg)				Clean & Jerk (kg)				Total
Rank	Athlete	Group	1	2	3	Rank	1	2	3	Rank	Total
1st place, gold medalist(s)	Li Dayin (CHN)	A	171	176	180	1st place, gold medalist(s)	205	~~216~~	216	2nd place, silver medalist(s)	396
2nd place, silver medalist(s)	Tian Tao (CHN)	A	165	~~172~~	~~172~~	3rd place, bronze medalist(s)	210	~~222~~	222	1st place, gold medalist(s)	387
3rd place, bronze medalist(s)	Mirmostafa Javadi (IRI)	A	154	159	~~163~~	8	197	205	~~211~~	3rd place, bronze medalist(s)	364
4	Sergey Petrovich (KAZ)	A	~~165~~	165	~~170~~	5	193	198	~~202~~	6	363
5	Yu Dong-ju (KOR)	A	155	161	~~166~~	6	195	201	~~206~~	5	362
6	Amur Al-Khanjari (OMA)	A	150	155	~~161~~	9	191	202	~~206~~	4	357
7	Emil Moldodosov (KGZ)	A	160	166	~~169~~	2nd place, silver medalist(s)	~~187~~	187	~~192~~	10	353
8	Kianoush Rostami (IRI)	A	165	~~172~~	~~172~~	4	186	~~207~~	~~207~~	11	351
9	Assylzhan Bektay (KAZ)	A	155	160	~~164~~	7	185	~~191~~	~~191~~	13	345
10	Hsieh Meng-en (TPE)	B	145	~~150~~	150	11	185	190	~~196~~	7	340
11	Daisuke Shishido (JPN)	B	150	~~155~~	~~155~~	10	185	~~195~~	~~202~~	12	335
12	Lim Kang Yin (SGP)	B	130	135	~~140~~	12	160	~~170~~	170	14	305
13	Dorjsembiin Dorjnamjim (MGL)	B	115	~~120~~	122	13	148	~~153~~	158	15	280
14	Asomuddin Sangov (TJK)	B	105	110	~~117~~	14	135	141	145	16	255
—	Phacharamethi Tharaphan (THA)	A	~~145~~	~~145~~	~~145~~	—	190	~~196~~	~~196~~	8	—
—	Şatlyk Şöhradow (TKM)	A	~~161~~	~~161~~	~~163~~	—	~~190~~	~~190~~	190	9	—

=== 96 kg ===
Rank	Athlete	Group	Snatch (kg)				Clean & Jerk (kg)				Total
Rank	Athlete	Group	1	2	3	Rank	1	2	3	Rank	Total
1st place, gold medalist(s)	Liu Huanhua (CHN)	A	~~170~~	170	175	1st place, gold medalist(s)	210	~~223~~	~~223~~	2nd place, silver medalist(s)	385
2nd place, silver medalist(s)	Won Jong-beom (KOR)	A	165	~~170~~	171	3rd place, bronze medalist(s)	205	~~211~~	211	1st place, gold medalist(s)	382
3rd place, bronze medalist(s)	Sarat Sumpradit (THA)	A	169	173	~~176~~	2nd place, silver medalist(s)	202	~~206~~	207	3rd place, bronze medalist(s)	380
4	Qasim Hasan (IRQ)	A	161	167	~~172~~	4	191	195	198	4	365
5	Sunnatilla Usarov (UZB)	A	162	~~166~~	~~168~~	6	190	196	~~200~~	5	358
6	Şahzadbek Matýakubow (TKM)	A	160	165	~~168~~	5	192	~~198~~	~~199~~	6	357
7	Ayoub Mousavi (IRI)	A	~~154~~	155	~~162~~	7	182	191	~~204~~	7	346
8	Khojiakbar Olimov (UZB)	A	145	150	155	8	185	190	~~194~~	9	345
9	Denis Poluboyarinov (KAZ)	A	145	150	~~155~~	9	190	~~196~~	~~197~~	8	340
10	Asem Al-Sallaj (JOR)	A	135	140	~~145~~	10	172	180	~~184~~	10	320
—	Mohammad Al-Ruweai (KUW)	A	120	~~127~~	~~130~~	11	~~150~~	~~150~~	~~150~~	—	—

=== 102 kg ===
Rank	Athlete	Group	Snatch (kg)				Clean & Jerk (kg)				Total
Rank	Athlete	Group	1	2	3	Rank	1	2	3	Rank	Total
1st place, gold medalist(s)	Nurgissa Adiletuly (KAZ)	A	173	178	181	2nd place, silver medalist(s)	210	215	219	1st place, gold medalist(s)	400
2nd place, silver medalist(s)	Jin Yun-seong (KOR)	A	175	~~180~~	180	5	213	218	~~221~~	2nd place, silver medalist(s)	398
3rd place, bronze medalist(s)	Jang Yeon-hak (KOR)	A	175	179	182	1st place, gold medalist(s)	~~210~~	210	~~216~~	5	392
4	Chen Po-jen (TPE)	A	173	178	181	3rd place, bronze medalist(s)	~~203~~	~~205~~	205	6	386
5	Reza Dehdar (IRI)	A	166	172	~~179~~	6	204	211	~~221~~	4	383
6	Bekdoolot Rasulbekov (KGZ)	A	164	~~169~~	~~169~~	7	208	214	217	3rd place, bronze medalist(s)	381
7	Döwranbek Hasanbaýew (TKM)	A	173	177	180	4	192	~~197~~	~~197~~	9	372
8	Sohrab Moradi (IRI)	B	157	162	~~166~~	9	200	~~210~~	~~221~~	7	362
9	Ryunosuke Mochida (JPN)	B	162	~~172~~	~~172~~	8	~~200~~	200	~~220~~	8	362
10	Layth Al-Chlaihawi (IRQ)	B	155	~~161~~	~~161~~	10	190	~~200~~	~~200~~	10	345
11	Ma Ching-chieh (TPE)	B	~~145~~	~~145~~	145	11	180	~~186~~	~~186~~	11	325
12	Akbarzhon Ghafurov (TJK)	B	110	115	120	12	140	145	~~147~~	12	265
—	Lesman Paredes (BHR)	A	—	—	—	—	—	—	—	—	—
—	Fares El-Bakh (QAT)	A	—	—	—	—	—	—	—	—	—

=== 109 kg ===
Rank	Athlete	Group	Snatch (kg)				Clean & Jerk (kg)				Total
Rank	Athlete	Group	1	2	3	Rank	1	2	3	Rank	Total
1st place, gold medalist(s)	Ruslan Nurudinov (UZB)	A	170	175	177	2nd place, silver medalist(s)	213	221	228	1st place, gold medalist(s)	405
2nd place, silver medalist(s)	Artyom Antropov (KAZ)	A	165	169	172	4	220	~~227~~	227	2nd place, silver medalist(s)	399
3rd place, bronze medalist(s)	Andas Samarkanov (KAZ)	A	162	169	~~173~~	5	212	221	~~228~~	3rd place, bronze medalist(s)	390
4	Ammar Rubaiawi (IRQ)	A	172	176	178	1st place, gold medalist(s)	202	211	~~215~~	5	389
5	Mehdi Karami (IRI)	A	166	173	~~177~~	3rd place, bronze medalist(s)	203	211	~~217~~	6	384
6	Amir Azizi (IRI)	A	163	169	~~174~~	6	201	212	~~218~~	4	381
7	Dong Bing-cheng (TPE)	A	165	~~171~~	~~171~~	7	205	~~212~~	~~213~~	7	370
8	Kurbonmurod Nomozov (UZB)	A	152	157	~~162~~	8	190	200	203	8	360
—	Bader Al-Shammari (KUW)	A	~~120~~	~~120~~	~~120~~	—	140	~~155~~	155	9	—
—	Ali Al-Khazal (KSA)	A	—	—	—	—	—	—	—	—	—

=== +109 kg ===
Rank	Athlete	Group	Snatch (kg)				Clean & Jerk (kg)				Total
Rank	Athlete	Group	1	2	3	Rank	1	2	3	Rank	Total
1st place, gold medalist(s)	Gor Minasyan (BHR)	A	203	213	217; AR	1st place, gold medalist(s)	235	~~246~~	247	1st place, gold medalist(s)	464; AR
2nd place, silver medalist(s)	Rustam Djangabaev (UZB)	A	185	191	196	3rd place, bronze medalist(s)	232	241	—	4	437
3rd place, bronze medalist(s)	Akbar Djuraev (UZB)	A	189	~~195~~	195	4	230	~~240~~	242	3rd place, bronze medalist(s)	437
4	Ayat Sharifi (IRI)	A	186	192	197	2nd place, silver medalist(s)	230	239	~~245~~	5	436
5	Alireza Yousefi (IRI)	A	176	184	190	5	236	246	~~249~~	2nd place, silver medalist(s)	436
6	Hojamuhammet Toýçyýew (TKM)	A	175	181	~~186~~	7	215	220	225	6	406
7	Kosuke Chinen (JPN)	A	180	~~186~~	~~186~~	8	205	222	~~226~~	7	402
8	Eishiro Murakami (JPN)	A	180	185	~~190~~	6	216	~~226~~	~~236~~	9	401
9	Jo Seong-bin (KOR)	A	176	~~184~~	~~185~~	9	~~220~~	~~220~~	222	8	398
10	Jin Cheng (TPE)	A	165	~~175~~	~~176~~	10	205	~~215~~	216	10	381
11	Sagar Bhandari (NEP)	A	112	~~118~~	~~118~~	11	145	152	~~161~~	11	264
—	Man Asaad (SYR)	A	—	—	—	—	—	—	—	—	—

== Women's results ==
=== 45 kg ===
Rank	Athlete	Group	Snatch (kg)				Clean & Jerk (kg)				Total
Rank	Athlete	Group	1	2	3	Rank	1	2	3	Rank	Total
1st place, gold medalist(s)	Chayuttra Pramongkhol (THA)	A	75	~~77~~	77	1st place, gold medalist(s)	91	95	100	1st place, gold medalist(s)	177
2nd place, silver medalist(s)	Rose Jean Ramos (PHI)	A	70	73	~~75~~	2nd place, silver medalist(s)	85	88	~~90~~	2nd place, silver medalist(s)	161
3rd place, bronze medalist(s)	Siti Nafisatul Hariroh (INA)	A	68	~~71~~	71	3rd place, bronze medalist(s)	86	~~88~~	88	3rd place, bronze medalist(s)	159
4	Khemika Kamnoedsri (THA)	A	69	~~71~~	~~73~~	4	~~86~~	86	~~89~~	5	155
5	Hong Zi-yu (TPE)	A	66	~~68~~	~~68~~	5	85	87	~~89~~	4	153
6	Ainur Abdykalykova (KAZ)	A	58	62	64	6	75	78	80	6	144
—	Khổng Mỹ Phượng (VIE)	A	~~74~~	~~74~~	~~74~~	—	—	—	—	—	—

=== 49 kg ===
Rank	Athlete	Group	Snatch (kg)				Clean & Jerk (kg)				Total
Rank	Athlete	Group	1	2	3	Rank	1	2	3	Rank	Total
1st place, gold medalist(s)	Jiang Huihua (CHN)	A	88	92	94	1st place, gold medalist(s)	110	113	~~120~~	1st place, gold medalist(s)	207
2nd place, silver medalist(s)	Hou Zhihui (CHN)	A	86	89	93	2nd place, silver medalist(s)	107	111	~~115~~	3rd place, bronze medalist(s)	204
3rd place, bronze medalist(s)	Surodchana Khambao (THA)	A	~~88~~	88	90	4	110	~~112~~	~~112~~	4	200
4	Thanyathon Sukcharoen (THA)	A	87	88	90	3rd place, bronze medalist(s)	105	108	110	5	200
5	Rira Suzuki (JPN)	B	81	~~83~~	83	7	104	108	111	2nd place, silver medalist(s)	194
6	Mirabai Chanu (IND)	A	85	~~88~~	~~88~~	5	109	—	—	6	194
7	Shin Jae-gyeong (KOR)	B	79	81	~~83~~	9	98	101	103	9	184
8	Lin Cheng-jing (TPE)	A	~~80~~	80	~~83~~	12	100	102	104	7	184
9	Rosegie Ramos (PHI)	B	82	84	~~87~~	6	99	~~102~~	~~102~~	13	183
10	Lovely Inan (PHI)	B	~~80~~	80	~~83~~	11	~~103~~	103	~~105~~	8	183
11	Chiaki Ajima (JPN)	B	~~82~~	82	~~84~~	8	~~100~~	100	~~107~~	12	182
12	Phạm Đình Thi (VIE)	A	~~79~~	79	~~82~~	14	100	~~103~~	103	10	182
13	Fang Wan-ling (TPE)	B	75	80	~~82~~	10	95	98	101	11	181
14	Buyandelgeriin Erdenezul (MGL)	B	71	~~75~~	~~75~~	15	87	92	~~95~~	15	163
—	Ýulduz Jumabaýewa (TKM)	A	~~75~~	~~75~~	~~75~~	—	96	99	~~101~~	14	—
—	Windy Cantika Aisah (INA)	A	~~80~~	80	~~83~~	13	~~95~~	~~95~~	~~95~~	—	—
—	Nguyễn Hoài Hương (VIE)	B	~~75~~	~~75~~	~~75~~	—	~~91~~	91	~~94~~	16	—
—	Bägül Berdiýewa (TKM)	B	~~72~~	~~72~~	~~75~~	—	~~88~~	—	—	—	—

=== 55 kg ===
Rank	Athlete	Group	Snatch (kg)				Clean & Jerk (kg)				Total
Rank	Athlete	Group	1	2	3	Rank	1	2	3	Rank	Total
1st place, gold medalist(s)	Chen Guan-ling (TPE)	A	87	~~90~~	90	1st place, gold medalist(s)	107	110	114	1st place, gold medalist(s)	204
2nd place, silver medalist(s)	Bindyarani Devi (IND)	A	80	83	~~85~~	4	109	111	~~115~~	2nd place, silver medalist(s)	194
3rd place, bronze medalist(s)	Võ Thị Quỳnh Như (VIE)	A	85	~~88~~	88	2nd place, silver medalist(s)	104	~~108~~	~~108~~	4	192
4	Jamila Panfilova (UZB)	A	83	86	~~88~~	3rd place, bronze medalist(s)	102	105	~~107~~	3rd place, bronze medalist(s)	191
5	Kristina Şermetowa (TKM)	A	82	~~85~~	~~86~~	5	103	~~106~~	~~107~~	6	185
6	Jang Eun-bi (KOR)	A	77	80	~~83~~	6	103	~~106~~	~~108~~	5	183
7	Siti Zahra (INA)	A	75	~~78~~	78	8	95	100	~~103~~	7	178
8	Yekaterina Alyakina (KAZ)	A	78	~~81~~	~~82~~	7	98	~~101~~	~~102~~	8	176
9	Nigora Abdullaeva (UZB)	A	72	75	77	9	90	~~95~~	~~95~~	9	167
10	Srity Akter (BAN)	A	65	68	~~70~~	10	85	~~88~~	88	11	156
11	Chua Jiin Linn (SGP)	A	63	66	~~68~~	11	~~85~~	85	88	10	154

=== 59 kg ===
Rank	Athlete	Group	Snatch (kg)				Clean & Jerk (kg)				Total
Rank	Athlete	Group	1	2	3	Rank	1	2	3	Rank	Total
1st place, gold medalist(s)	Luo Shifang (CHN)	A	98	102	105	1st place, gold medalist(s)	126	130	133	2nd place, silver medalist(s)	238
2nd place, silver medalist(s)	Pei Xinyi (CHN)	A	100	103	~~106~~	2nd place, silver medalist(s)	125	130	133	1st place, gold medalist(s)	236
3rd place, bronze medalist(s)	Kuo Hsing-chun (TPE)	A	98	100	102	3	128	~~132~~	~~135~~	3rd place, bronze medalist(s)	230
4	Hidilyn Diaz (PHI)	A	93	97	99	4	118	122	~~125~~	5	221
5	Mikiko Ando (JPN)	A	90	93	~~95~~	10	120	123	~~125~~	4	216
6	Seo Jeong-mi (KOR)	A	93	~~97~~	98	6	113	~~117~~	117	6	215
7	Natasya Beteyob (INA)	B	87	91	94	9	~~111~~	111	115	7	209
8	Thanaporn Saetia (THA)	A	88	92	95	8	110	~~114~~	114	8	209
9	Enkhbaataryn Enkhtamir (MGL)	A	91	~~93~~	96	7	110	~~115~~	~~117~~	12	206
10	Riri Endo (JPN)	B	~~92~~	92	~~95~~	11	110	~~112~~	112	9	204
11	Boldbaataryn Khongorzul (MGL)	B	85	~~91~~	~~91~~	12	110	~~113~~	~~113~~	10	195
12	Nelly (INA)	B	~~83~~	83	~~85~~	13	105	~~110~~	110	11	193
13	Alina Koliushko (KAZ)	B	~~78~~	78	81	14	95	~~100~~	~~100~~	14	176
14	Reihaneh Karimi (IRI)	B	75	~~80~~	~~80~~	15	95	~~100~~	100	13	175
—	Elreen Ando (PHI)	A	95	~~98~~	99	5	~~125~~	~~125~~	~~125~~	—	—
—	Suratwadee Yodsarn (THA)	A	~~90~~	—	—	—	—	—	—	—	—
—	Quàng Thị Tâm (VIE)	A	—	—	—	—	—	—	—	—	—

=== 64 kg ===
Rank	Athlete	Group	Snatch (kg)				Clean & Jerk (kg)				Total
Rank	Athlete	Group	1	2	3	Rank	1	2	3	Rank	Total
1st place, gold medalist(s)	Ganzorigiin Anuujin (MGL)	A	93	~~98~~	~~99~~	1st place, gold medalist(s)	113	116	118	1st place, gold medalist(s)	211
2nd place, silver medalist(s)	Medine Amanowa (TKM)	A	85	88	90	3rd place, bronze medalist(s)	105	110	117	2nd place, silver medalist(s)	207
3rd place, bronze medalist(s)	Fatemeh Keshavarz (IRI)	A	~~83~~	85	~~89~~	5	105	109	~~113~~	3rd place, bronze medalist(s)	194
4	Li Wei-chia (TPE)	A	~~86~~	86	~~89~~	4	105	~~107~~	107	4	193
5	Karina Goricheva (KAZ)	A	85	90	91	2nd place, silver medalist(s)	95	101	~~106~~	5	192
6	Mabia Akhter (BAN)	A	70	73	~~75~~	7	91	~~96~~	96	6	169
7	Gülşat Durdyýewa (TKM)	A	78	80	~~82~~	6	87	~~90~~	~~90~~	8	167
—	Nicole Heng Ling Li (SGP)	A	~~74~~	~~74~~	~~75~~	—	~~90~~	~~90~~	90	7	—

=== 71 kg ===
Rank	Athlete	Group	Snatch (kg)				Clean & Jerk (kg)				Total
Rank	Athlete	Group	1	2	3	Rank	1	2	3	Rank	Total
1st place, gold medalist(s)	Liao Guifang (CHN)	A	110	115	120	1st place, gold medalist(s)	140	148	—	1st place, gold medalist(s)	268
2nd place, silver medalist(s)	Vanessa Sarno (PHI)	A	100	105	107	2nd place, silver medalist(s)	126	132	~~136~~	2nd place, silver medalist(s)	239
3rd place, bronze medalist(s)	Chen Wen-huei (TPE)	B	93	97	101	6	123	128	131	3rd place, bronze medalist(s)	232
4	Zeng Tiantian (CHN)	A	98	102	~~105~~	4	~~125~~	126	129	5	231
5	Phạm Thị Hồng Thanh (VIE)	A	96	100	103	3rd place, bronze medalist(s)	118	123	127	6	230
6	Miku Ishii (JPN)	A	98	101	~~102~~	7	~~120~~	120	125	7	226
7	Runa Segawa (JPN)	B	~~93~~	93	96	9	121	126	129	4	225
8	Kristel Macrohon (PHI)	A	98	~~102~~	~~104~~	8	~~120~~	120	~~125~~	9	218
9	Mahassen Fattouh (LBN)	B	86	90	94	10	105	110	115	10	209
10	Mai Al-Madani (UAE)	B	66	~~70~~	~~70~~	11	77	80	~~85~~	11	146
—	Mun Min-hee (KOR)	A	95	99	102	5	~~124~~	~~124~~	~~124~~	—	—
—	Gombosürengiin Enerel (MGL)	A	~~90~~	~~90~~	~~90~~	—	115	~~120~~	122	8	—
—	Gülnabat Kadyrowa (TKM)	B	—	—	—	—	—	—	—	—	—

=== 76 kg ===
Rank	Athlete	Group	Snatch (kg)				Clean & Jerk (kg)				Total
Rank	Athlete	Group	1	2	3	Rank	1	2	3	Rank	Total
1st place, gold medalist(s)	Kim Su-hyeon (KOR)	A	100	105	109	2nd place, silver medalist(s)	129	~~134~~	134	1st place, gold medalist(s)	243
2nd place, silver medalist(s)	Siriyakorn Khaipandung (THA)	A	105	108	110	1st place, gold medalist(s)	123	127	~~130~~	3rd place, bronze medalist(s)	237
3rd place, bronze medalist(s)	Lee Min-ji (KOR)	A	~~96~~	96	100	3rd place, bronze medalist(s)	124	128	~~131~~	2nd place, silver medalist(s)	228
4	Aray Nurlybekova (KAZ)	A	93	98	~~101~~	4	120	~~125~~	~~127~~	4	218
5	Li Xing-en (TPE)	A	~~85~~	85	~~93~~	5	115	~~121~~	~~121~~	5	200

=== 81 kg ===
Rank	Athlete	Group	Snatch (kg)				Clean & Jerk (kg)				Total
Rank	Athlete	Group	1	2	3	Rank	1	2	3	Rank	Total
1st place, gold medalist(s)	Liang Xiaomei (CHN)	A	113	118	120	1st place, gold medalist(s)	145	150	155	1st place, gold medalist(s)	275
2nd place, silver medalist(s)	Wang Zhouyu (CHN)	A	~~115~~	~~115~~	115	2nd place, silver medalist(s)	140	146	~~151~~	2nd place, silver medalist(s)	261
3rd place, bronze medalist(s)	Mönkhjantsangiin Ankhtsetseg (MGL)	A	106	~~108~~	108	3rd place, bronze medalist(s)	135	—	—	3rd place, bronze medalist(s)	243
4	Kim I-seul (KOR)	A	100	105	107	4	126	131	~~136~~	5	238
5	Elham Hosseini (IRI)	A	101	~~105~~	106	5	125	~~131~~	131	6	237
6	Wakana Nagashima (JPN)	A	95	100	~~105~~	6	125	130	135	4	235
7	Haruko Yamasaki (JPN)	A	95	~~102~~	~~102~~	7	121	~~130~~	~~137~~	8	216
8	Aiym Yeszhanova (KAZ)	A	90	93	~~97~~	8	118	123	~~125~~	7	216
9	Parisa Nourali (IRI)	A	~~91~~	91	~~96~~	9	~~116~~	116	~~121~~	9	207
10	Fatemah Al-Buloushi (KUW)	A	60	65	~~68~~	10	80	85	90	10	155
—	Naji Hanan Fahd (YEM)	A	~~62~~	~~62~~	62	11	~~78~~	~~78~~	~~78~~	—	—

=== 87 kg ===
Rank	Athlete	Group	Snatch (kg)				Clean & Jerk (kg)				Total
Rank	Athlete	Group	1	2	3	Rank	1	2	3	Rank	Total
1st place, gold medalist(s)	Lo Ying-yuan (TPE)	A	105	~~110~~	110	1st place, gold medalist(s)	127	~~130~~	131	2nd place, silver medalist(s)	241
2nd place, silver medalist(s)	Yun Ha-je (KOR)	A	~~99~~	~~99~~	99	5	130	132	~~143~~	1st place, gold medalist(s)	231
3rd place, bronze medalist(s)	Rigina Adashbaeva (UZB)	A	97	101	103	2nd place, silver medalist(s)	122	~~126~~	127	4	230
4	Aisha Omarova (KAZ)	A	96	~~99~~	100	4	123	127	~~131~~	3rd place, bronze medalist(s)	227
5	Anamjan Rustamowa (TKM)	A	98	100	102	3rd place, bronze medalist(s)	120	124	~~129~~	5	226
6	Zeinab Sheikh-Arbab (IRI)	A	91	95	~~97~~	6	123	~~128~~	~~128~~	6	218
7	Dinara Kipshakbay (KAZ)	A	87	~~90~~	90	7	108	113	~~118~~	7	203

=== +87 kg ===
Rank	Athlete	Group	Snatch (kg)				Clean & Jerk (kg)				Total
Rank	Athlete	Group	1	2	3	Rank	1	2	3	Rank	Total
1st place, gold medalist(s)	Li Wenwen (CHN)	A	130	135	140	1st place, gold medalist(s)	170	175	—	1st place, gold medalist(s)	315
2nd place, silver medalist(s)	Park Hye-jeong (KOR)	A	118	125	127	2nd place, silver medalist(s)	158	165	168	3rd place, bronze medalist(s)	295
3rd place, bronze medalist(s)	Son Young-hee (KOR)	A	120	~~126~~	~~126~~	3rd place, bronze medalist(s)	158	~~165~~	169	2nd place, silver medalist(s)	289
4	Lyubov Kovalchuk (KAZ)	A	110	115	118	4	146	151	156	4	274
5	Aisamal Sansyzbayeva (KAZ)	A	105	110	113	6	138	143	146	5	259
6	Tursunoy Jabborova (UZB)	A	107	112	115	5	130	135	140	6	255
7	Wang Ling-chen (TPE)	A	105	110	~~113~~	7	~~138~~	138	~~142~~	7	248
8	Yuna Nakajima (JPN)	A	~~102~~	~~102~~	102	8	130	137	~~147~~	8	239
9	Trần Thị Hiền (VIE)	A	95	~~98~~	98	9	120	125	~~130~~	9	223
—	Duangaksorn Chaidee (THA)	A	~~132~~	—	—	—	—	—	—	—	—
