= 2023 World Weightlifting Championships – Men's 67 kg =

The men's 67 kilograms competition at the 2023 World Weightlifting Championships was held on 7 September 2023.

== Schedule ==
Date	Time	Event
7 September 2023	16:00	Group B
7 September 2023	19:00	Group A

== Medalists ==
Event	Gold		Silver		Bronze	
Snatch	Chen Lijun (CHN)	153 kg	Eko Yuli Irawan (INA)	146 kg	Gor Sahakyan (ARM)	142 kg
Clean & Jerk	Chen Lijun (CHN)	180 kg	Francisco Mosquera (COL)	176 kg	Lee Sang-yeon (KOR)	176 kg
Total	Chen Lijun (CHN)	333 kg	Eko Yuli Irawan (INA)	321 kg	Gor Sahakyan (ARM)	312 kg

== Records ==
Prior to this competition, the existing world records were as follows.

World record	Snatch	Huang Minhao (CHN)	155 kg	Tokyo, Japan	6 July 2019
World record	Clean & jerk	Pak Jong-ju (PRK)	188 kg	Pattaya, Thailand	20 September 2019
World record	Total	Chen Lijun (CHN)	339 kg	Ningbo, China	21 April 2019

== Results ==
Rank	Athlete	Group	Snatch (kg)				Clean & Jerk (kg)				Total
Rank	Athlete	Group	1	2	3	Rank	1	2	3	Rank	Total
1st place, gold medalist(s)	Chen Lijun (CHN)	A	145	150	153	1st place, gold medalist(s)	175	180	—	1st place, gold medalist(s)	333
2nd place, silver medalist(s)	Eko Yuli Irawan (INA)	B	142	146	~~150~~	2nd place, silver medalist(s)	165	175	~~181~~	4	321
3rd place, bronze medalist(s)	Gor Sahakyan (ARM)	A	~~142~~	~~142~~	142	3rd place, bronze medalist(s)	~~170~~	~~170~~	170	6	312
4	Francisco Mosquera (COL)	A	135	~~138~~	~~138~~	7	176	~~181~~	~~181~~	2nd place, silver medalist(s)	311
5	Lee Sang-yeon (KOR)	A	130	~~135~~	~~135~~	10	176	~~181~~	~~181~~	3rd place, bronze medalist(s)	306
6	Doston Yokubov (UZB)	A	132	~~135~~	135	9	168	~~177~~	~~177~~	7	303
7	Valentin Genchev (BUL)	A	130	~~135~~	135	8	167	~~170~~	~~170~~	8	302
8	Bunýad Raşidow (TKM)	A	140	~~143~~	~~145~~	5	157	161	~~163~~	9	301
9	Mohammad Yasin (INA)	B	130	135	140	4	160	~~165~~	~~165~~	11	300
10	Kaan Kahriman (TUR)	A	137	~~141~~	~~142~~	6	158	161	~~165~~	10	298
11	Seraj Al-Saleem (KSA)	B	~~121~~	121	125	13	~~155~~	158	~~165~~	14	283
12	Sairamkez Akmolda (KAZ)	B	110	115	120	14	155	160	~~165~~	12	280
13	Víctor Castro (ESP)	B	~~125~~	125	~~130~~	12	145	150	~~153~~	16	275
14	Perhat Bagtyýarow (TKM)	B	115	~~120~~	120	15	145	150	155	15	275
15	Mohammed Al-Zawri (KSA)	B	100	105	110	16	127	133	137	17	247
16	Mohammad Nashrul Bin Haji Abu Bakar (BRU)	B	100	~~103~~	103	17	125	130	~~133~~	18	233
17	Mohammed Abdulredha (KUW)	B	91	97	101	18	124	128	~~133~~	19	229
18	Kaimauri Erati (KIR)	B	90	95	~~100~~	19	~~115~~	115	~~120~~	20	210
—	Ferdi Hardal (TUR)	A	~~136~~	~~136~~	~~137~~	—	~~161~~	—	—	—	—
—	Goga Chkheidze (GEO)	A	130	~~134~~	~~135~~	11	~~160~~	~~160~~	~~161~~	—	—
—	He Yueji (CHN)	A	~~145~~	~~145~~	~~145~~	—	172	~~178~~	~~178~~	5	—
—	Han Myeong-mok (KOR)	B	~~140~~	~~141~~	~~141~~	—	~~160~~	160	—	13	—
—	Faris Durak (BIH)	B	~~100~~	—	—	—	~~120~~	—	—	—	—
—	Isa Rustamov (AZE)	B	~~128~~	—	—	—	—	—	—	—	—
—	Acorán Hernández (ESP)	B	—	—	—	—	—	—	—	—	—
—	Angel Rusev (BUL)	B	—	—	—	—	—	—	—	—	—
