= 2022 World Weightlifting Championships – Men's 67 kg =

2022 men's 67 kilograms world's competition

The men's 67 kilograms competition at the 2022 World Weightlifting Championships was held on 8 and 9 December 2022.

== Schedule ==
Date	Time	Event
8 December 2022	14:00	Group B
9 December 2022	16:30	Group A

== Medalists ==
Event	Gold		Silver		Bronze	
Snatch	Chen Lijun (CHN)	148 kg	Witsanu Chantri (THA)	144 kg	Weeraphon Wichuma (THA)	143 kg
Clean & Jerk	Yusuf Fehmi Genç (TUR)	182 kg	Francisco Mosquera (COL)	182 kg	Weeraphon Wichuma (THA)	180 kg
Total	Francisco Mosquera (COL)	325 kg	Chen Lijun (CHN)	324 kg	Weeraphon Wichuma (THA)	323 kg

== Records ==
Prior to this competition, the existing world records were as follows.

World record	Snatch	Huang Minhao (CHN)	155 kg	Tokyo, Japan	6 July 2019
World record	Clean & Jerk	Pak Jong-ju (PRK)	188 kg	Pattaya, Thailand	20 September 2019
World record	Total	Chen Lijun (CHN)	339 kg	Ningbo, China	21 April 2019

== Results ==
Rank	Athlete	Group	Snatch (kg)				Clean & Jerk (kg)				Total
Rank	Athlete	Group	1	2	3	Rank	1	2	3	Rank	Total
1st place, gold medalist(s)	Francisco Mosquera (COL)	A	140	143	~~145~~	4	177	~~182~~	182	2nd place, silver medalist(s)	325
2nd place, silver medalist(s)	Chen Lijun (CHN)	A	145	148	~~150~~	1st place, gold medalist(s)	171	~~176~~	176	6	324
3rd place, bronze medalist(s)	Weeraphon Wichuma (THA)	A	143	~~147~~	~~147~~	3rd place, bronze medalist(s)	~~175~~	175	180	3rd place, bronze medalist(s)	323
4	Yusuf Fehmi Genç (TUR)	A	~~135~~	136	140	9	175	179	182	1st place, gold medalist(s)	322
5	Jair Reyes (ECU)	A	136	140	~~144~~	8	170	176	~~180~~	5	316
6	Lee Sang-yeon (KOR)	A	~~135~~	~~135~~	136	11	~~178~~	178	~~182~~	4	314
7	Witsanu Chantri (THA)	A	~~139~~	139	144	2nd place, silver medalist(s)	168	~~171~~	~~172~~	8	312
8	Anatoliy Savelyev (KAZ)	A	135	140	~~145~~	7	163	~~167~~	167	9	307
9	Doston Yokubov (UZB)	A	~~135~~	135	~~138~~	12	172	~~178~~	~~178~~	7	307
10	Kaan Kahriman (TUR)	B	136	141	~~143~~	6	159	163	165	12	306
11	Bunýad Raşidow (TKM)	B	~~140~~	~~140~~	142	5	159	~~162~~	~~163~~	19	301
12	Tojonirina Andriatsitohaina (MAD)	A	~~135~~	~~135~~	135	13	165	~~170~~	~~171~~	13	300
13	Acorán Hernández (ESP)	B	134	~~137~~	137	10	158	161	~~164~~	16	298
14	Valentin Genchev (BUL)	B	~~130~~	130	~~135~~	16	166	~~172~~	~~172~~	10	296
15	Petr Petrov (CZE)	B	~~133~~	133	~~137~~	14	~~162~~	~~162~~	162	15	295
16	Hafez Ghashghaei (IRI)	B	~~126~~	~~126~~	126	19	165	~~173~~	~~173~~	11	291
17	Ding Hongjie (CHN)	B	130	~~135~~	~~135~~	15	160	~~165~~	~~168~~	17	290
18	Dave Pacaldo (PHI)	B	123	~~128~~	128	18	~~157~~	157	162	14	290
19	Gurami Giorbelidze (GEO)	B	125	~~128~~	129	17	155	160	~~163~~	18	289
20	Elyas Al-Busaidi (OMA)	B	115	120	~~125~~	20	147	152	~~159~~	20	272
—	Adkhamjon Ergashev (UZB)	A	~~136~~	~~136~~	~~139~~	—	~~172~~	~~172~~	—	—	—
