= Results of the 2013 National Games of China =

This article gives an overview of the medal winners and their respective results at the 2013 National Games of China. There were 31 sports and 350 disciplines.

== Weightlifting ==
=== Men ===
Event	Gold		Silver		Bronze	
56 kg	Long Qingquan; Hunan	296 kg	Zhao Chaojun; Sichuan	294 kg	Li Lizhi; Hunan	293 kg
62 kg	Chen Lijun; PLA	321 kg	Zhang Jie; Fujian	319 kg	Yu Tao; Hunan	318 kg
69 kg	Liao Hui; PLA	348 kg	Liang Chenxi; Fujian	340 kg	Feng Lüdong; Zhejiang	339 kg
77 kg	Lü Xiaojun; Tianjin	366 kg	Su Dajin; PLA	356 kg	Su Ying; Zhejiang	346 kg
85 kg	Jiang Hairong; Guangdong	375 kg	Huang Zhong; Sichuan	370 kg	Tian Tao; Hubei	363 kg
94 kg	Li Bing; Guangxi	387 kg	Liu Hao; Hubei	382 kg	He Shuyong; Shandong	373 kg
105 kg	Yang Zhe; Shandong	395 kg	Jiang Yunlong; Shanghai	395 kg	Yao Shunyu; PLA	383 kg
105+ kg	Ai Yunan; Beijing	435 kg	Sun Haibo; Jilin	434 kg	Yu Mingqiu; Jilin	420 kg

=== Women ===
Event	Gold		Silver		Bronze	
48 kg	Tan Yayun; Hunan	214 kg	Tian Yuan; Hubei	209 kg	Luo Bing; Hebei	202 kg
53 kg	Li Yajun; Guangdong	227 kg	Li Yan; Guangxi	222 kg	Zhang Wanqiong; Guangdong	221 kg
58 kg	Deng Wei; Fujian	239 kg	Zhou Jun; Hubei	232 kg	Meng Shanshan; Guangxi	232 kg
63 kg	Deng Mengrong; Guangxi	251 kg	Zhang Ruixiang; PLA	237 kg	Chen Xue; Liaoning	237 kg
69 kg	Xie Hongli; Shandong	265 kg	Xiang Yanmei; Hunan	265 kg	Chen Youjuan; PLA	255 kg
75 kg	Kang Yue; Shandong	290 kg	Li Xia; Shandong	268 kg	Li Rongyan; Guangxi	267 kg
75+ kg	Zhou Lulu; PLA	330 kg	Meng Suping; Anhui	319 kg	Zhou Xiaoman; Shandong	312 kg
