= 2015 World Weightlifting Championships – Men's 62 kg =

The men's 62 kilograms event at the 2015 World Weightlifting Championships was held on 20–22 November 2015 in Houston, United States.

== Schedule ==
Date	Time	Event
20 November 2015	11:00	Group D
21 November 2015	09:00	Group C
21 November 2015	19:25	Group B
22 November 2015	17:25	Group A

== Medalists ==
Event	Gold		Silver		Bronze	
Snatch	Chen Lijun (CHN)	150 kg	Francisco Mosquera (COL)	140 kg	Óscar Figueroa (COL)	140 kg
Clean & Jerk	Chen Lijun (CHN)	183 kg	Francisco Mosquera (COL)	175 kg	Óscar Figueroa (COL)	175 kg
Total	Chen Lijun (CHN)	333 kg	Francisco Mosquera (COL)	315 kg	Óscar Figueroa (COL)	315 kg

== Records ==
Prior to this competition, the existing world records were as follows.

World record	Snatch	Kim Un-guk (PRK)	154 kg	Incheon, South Korea	21 September 2014
World record	Clean & Jerk	Le Maosheng (CHN)	182 kg	Busan, South Korea	2 October 2002
World record	Total	Kim Un-guk (PRK)	332 kg	Incheon, South Korea	21 September 2014

== Results ==
Rank	Athlete	Group	Body weight	Snatch (kg)				Clean & Jerk (kg)				Total
Rank	Athlete	Group	Body weight	1	2	3	Rank	1	2	3	Rank	Total
1st place, gold medalist(s)	Chen Lijun (CHN)	A	61.89	145	150	~~152~~	1st place, gold medalist(s)	175	179	183	1st place, gold medalist(s)	333
2nd place, silver medalist(s)	Francisco Mosquera (COL)	A	61.50	135	140	~~142~~	2nd place, silver medalist(s)	170	175	~~177~~	2nd place, silver medalist(s)	315
3rd place, bronze medalist(s)	Óscar Figueroa (COL)	A	61.87	135	~~140~~	140	3rd place, bronze medalist(s)	175	~~180~~	~~180~~	3rd place, bronze medalist(s)	315
4	Eko Yuli Irawan (INA)	A	61.94	138	~~142~~	~~143~~	4	166	~~176~~	~~177~~	5	304
5	Sin Chol-bom (PRK)	A	61.78	127	130	~~132~~	9	167	170	~~175~~	4	300
6	Yoichi Itokazu (JPN)	B	61.90	126	130	132	7	158	162	~~165~~	7	294
7	Hurşit Atak (TUR)	A	61.96	125	~~128~~	128	10	~~160~~	160	~~167~~	8	288
8	Han Myeong-mok (KOR)	A	61.90	~~133~~	~~133~~	133	6	~~154~~	154	~~158~~	19	287
9	Bünyamin Sezer (TUR)	A	61.93	~~130~~	130	134	5	~~150~~	150	153	20	287
10	Florin Croitoru (ROU)	B	61.46	127	~~131~~	131	8	150	155	~~158~~	15	286
11	Muhammad Hasbi (INA)	B	61.82	~~123~~	123	127	11	159	~~164~~	~~164~~	9	286
12	Jesús López (VEN)	B	61.91	123	126	~~128~~	15	152	156	158	11	284
13	Trần Lê Quốc Toàn (VIE)	B	60.56	120	~~125~~	125	17	152	158	~~161~~	10	283
14	Iurie Dudoglo (MDA)	B	61.25	123	~~126~~	126	14	152	157	~~160~~	12	283
15	Thawatchai Phonchiangsa (THA)	B	61.91	123	~~127~~	127	12	156	~~160~~	~~160~~	14	283
16	Antonio Vázquez (MEX)	C	61.97	118	~~122~~	~~122~~	32	155	160	165	6	283
17	Ahmed Saad (EGY)	B	61.97	122	~~127~~	127	13	152	~~158~~	—	22	279
18	Adkhamjon Ergashev (UZB)	C	61.84	117	119	122	24	148	152	156	13	278
19	Withawat Kritphet (THA)	C	61.72	120	~~123~~	123	20	150	154	~~155~~	18	277
20	Abdullatif Al-Abdullatif (KSA)	C	61.93	114	119	122	25	149	~~155~~	155	16	277
21	Ionuț Ilie (ROU)	B	61.95	~~122~~	122	~~126~~	26	145	150	155	17	277
22	Kao Chan-hung (TPE)	D	61.92	120	124	126	16	142	147	150	26	276
23	Majid Askari (IRI)	B	61.82	122	~~127~~	~~128~~	23	~~152~~	152	~~162~~	21	274
24	Roy López (VEN)	C	61.59	123	~~127~~	~~127~~	19	~~145~~	145	150	24	273
25	Gergely Soóky (HUN)	B	61.77	116	~~121~~	121	27	151	~~157~~	~~157~~	23	272
26	Yosuke Nakayama (JPN)	C	61.78	118	122	~~125~~	22	143	147	149	28	271
27	Morea Baru (PNG)	C	61.73	115	~~120~~	120	28	~~150~~	150	~~158~~	25	270
28	Dimitris Minasidis (CYP)	C	62.00	119	~~123~~	123	21	~~145~~	~~145~~	145	31	268
29	Derrick Johnson (USA)	B	62.00	120	~~124~~	~~124~~	29	~~147~~	~~147~~	147	29	267
30	Syrgak Abdyramanov (KGZ)	D	61.85	120	125	~~130~~	18	140	~~147~~	~~147~~	37	265
31	Sudesh Peiris (SRI)	C	61.68	~~118~~	~~118~~	118	31	145	~~150~~	~~150~~	30	263
32	Charles Ssekyaaya (UGA)	D	62.00	105	110	113	37	140	145	150	27	263
33	Cristhian Zurita (ECU)	D	61.52	118	~~123~~	~~123~~	30	~~141~~	141	~~144~~	35	259
34	Iván García (ESP)	D	61.80	110	115	~~118~~	35	135	140	144	33	259
35	Huang Ding-chieh (TPE)	D	61.72	110	114	~~116~~	36	140	~~144~~	144	32	258
36	Enkhjargalyn Mönkhdöl (MGL)	D	61.94	116	~~120~~	~~120~~	34	138	142	~~152~~	34	258
37	Deepak Lather (IND)	C	61.37	116	~~120~~	~~120~~	33	135	~~140~~	140	36	256
38	Petar Angelov (BUL)	D	61.93	~~110~~	110	~~113~~	38	130	135	~~140~~	40	245
39	Ianne Guiñares (NZL)	D	61.43	108	~~111~~	~~111~~	39	~~136~~	~~136~~	136	39	244
40	Abdulrahman Al-Beladi (KSA)	D	61.93	104	108	~~114~~	40	128	~~134~~	135	41	243
—	Stilyan Grozdev (BUL)	D	60.89	~~110~~	~~110~~	~~110~~	—	130	135	137	38	—
—	Julio Salamanca (ESA)	C	61.68	~~117~~	~~117~~	~~117~~	—	—	—	—	—	—
DQ	Kim Un-guk (PRK)	A	61.88	146	151	~~155~~	—	172	177	~~179~~	—	328
DQ	Valentin Hristov (AZE)	A	61.67	137	141	~~143~~	—	171	176	~~181~~	—	317
DQ	Stanislau Chadovich (BLR)	A	61.75	131	135	~~137~~	—	~~159~~	159	~~163~~	—	289
DQ	Ümürbek Bazarbaýew (TKM)	B	61.93	~~128~~	128	132	—	152	~~155~~	~~156~~	—	284
DQ	Ghenadie Dudoglo (MDA)	C	61.50	123	~~126~~	~~126~~	—	143	147	~~149~~	—	270

== New records ==
Clean & Jerk	183 kg	Chen Lijun (CHN)	WR
Total	333 kg	Chen Lijun (CHN)	WR
