= Weightlifting at the 2022 Asian Games – Men's 67 kg =

Men's 67 kg at the 2022 Asian Games
- Venue: Xiaoshan Sports Center Gymnasium
- Date: 1 October 2023
- Competitors: 16 from 12 nations

Medalists
gold medal	Chen Lijun	China
silver medal	Ri Won-ju	North Korea
bronze medal	Lee Sang-yeon	South Korea

The men's 67 kilograms competition at the 2022 Asian Games took place on 1 October 2023 at Xiaoshan Sports Center Gymnasium.

== Schedule ==
All times are China Standard Time (UTC+08:00)

Date	Time	Event
Sunday, 1 October 2023	10:00	Group B
Sunday, 1 October 2023	19:00	Group A

== Records ==
Prior to this competition, the existing world, Asian and Games records were as follows.

World Record	Snatch	Huang Minhao (CHN)	155 kg	Tokyo, Japan	6 July 2019
World Record	Clean & Jerk	Pak Jong-ju (PRK)	188 kg	Pattaya, Thailand	20 September 2019
World Record	Total	Chen Lijun (CHN)	339 kg	Ningbo, China	21 April 2019
Asian Record	Snatch	Huang Minhao (CHN)	155 kg	Tokyo, Japan	6 July 2019
Asian Record	Clean & Jerk	Pak Jong-ju (PRK)	188 kg	Pattaya, Thailand	20 September 2019
Asian Record	Total	Chen Lijun (CHN)	339 kg	Ningbo, China	21 April 2019
Games Record	Snatch	Asian Games Standard	149 kg	—	1 November 2018
Games Record	Clean & Jerk	Asian Games Standard	180 kg	—	1 November 2018
Games Record	Total	Asian Games Standard	323 kg	—	1 November 2018

== Results ==
Legend

- NM — No mark

Rank	Athlete	Group	Snatch (kg)				Clean & Jerk (kg)				Total
Rank	Athlete	Group	1	2	3	Result	1	2	3	Result	Total
1st place, gold medalist(s)	Chen Lijun (CHN)	A	~~145~~	145	150	150	175	~~180~~	180	180	330
2nd place, silver medalist(s)	Ri Won-ju (PRK)	A	138	141	~~144~~	141	175	180	~~190~~	180	321
3rd place, bronze medalist(s)	Lee Sang-yeon (KOR)	A	132	~~137~~	137	137	175	178	180	180	317
4	Doston Yokubov (UZB)	A	133	~~137~~	137	137	174	177	179	179	316
5	Anucha Doungsri (THA)	A	132	136	138	138	~~158~~	158	163	163	301
6	Bunýad Raşidow (TKM)	A	140	~~144~~	~~145~~	140	158	~~163~~	~~163~~	158	298
7	Ishimbek Muratbek Uulu (KGZ)	B	110	115	119	119	150	155	158	158	277
8	Elyas Al-Busaidi (OMA)	B	118	~~122~~	~~122~~	118	147	152	157	157	275
9	Petr Khrebtov (KAZ)	A	125	~~130~~	~~130~~	125	~~150~~	150	~~155~~	150	275
10	Ulaantsetsegiin Amarbayar (MGL)	B	114	118	122	122	~~141~~	141	~~145~~	141	263
11	Elzar Taiirov (KGZ)	B	110	~~115~~	~~115~~	110	132	137	~~141~~	137	247
12	Enkhchimegiin Düürenjargal (MGL)	B	~~113~~	113	~~120~~	113	128	133	~~138~~	133	246
—	Eko Yuli Irawan (INA)	A	~~142~~	145	~~148~~	145	~~175~~	~~175~~	~~175~~	—	NM
—	Witsanu Chantri (THA)	A	~~136~~	~~136~~	—	—	—	—	—	—	NM
—	Trần Minh Trí (VIE)	A	~~130~~	130	~~135~~	130	—	—	—	—	NM
—	Bae Moon-su (KOR)	A	~~128~~	~~128~~	~~130~~	—	—	—	—	—	NM

== New records ==
The following records were established during the competition.

Snatch	150	Chen Lijun (CHN)	GR
Total	325	Chen Lijun (CHN)	GR
Total	330	Chen Lijun (CHN)	GR
