= Weightlifting at the 2013 SEA Games – Men's 69 kg =

14 December 2013 at Thein Phyu Stadium

The men's 69 kg event at the 2013 SEA Games took place on 14 December 2013 at Thein Phyu Stadium.

== Schedule ==
All times are Myanmar Standard Time (UTC+06:30)

Date	Time	Event
Saturday, 14 December 2013	12:00	Final

== Results ==
Rank	Athlete	Group	Body weight	Snatch (kg)				Clean & Jerk (kg)				Total
Rank	Athlete	Group	Body weight	1	2	3	Result	1	2	3	Result	Total
1st place, gold medalist(s)	Deni Deni (INA)	A	67.80	138	142	148	148	158	162	167	167	324
2nd place, silver medalist(s)	Kyaw Moe Win (MYA)	A	67.55	135	~~140~~	140	140	170	174	~~182~~	174	314
3rd place, bronze medalist(s)	Tairat Bunsuk (THA)	A	68.15	~~136~~	137	~~140~~	137	170	174	175	175	312
4	Mohd Hafifi Mansor (MAS)	A	68.90	137	~~140~~	~~141~~	137	~~173~~	~~173~~	175	175	312

== New records ==
The following records were established during the competition.

Snatch	148	Deni Deni (INA)	GR
