= Weightlifting at the 2020 Summer Olympics – Men's 67 kg =

Men's 67 kg at the Games of the XXXII Olympiad
- Venue: Tokyo International Forum
- Date: 25 July 2021
- Competitors: 14 from 14 nations
- Winning total: 332 kg OR

Medalists
1st place, gold medalist(s)		Chen Lijun	China
2nd place, silver medalist(s)		Luis Javier Mosquera	Colombia
3rd place, bronze medalist(s)		Mirko Zanni	Italy

The men's 67 kg weightlifting competitions at the 2020 Summer Olympics in Tokyo took place on 25 July at the Tokyo International Forum. The weightlifter from China won the gold, with a combined lift of 332 kg.

== Records ==
{{{caption}}}
World Record	Snatch	Huang Minhao (CHN)	155 kg	Tokyo, Japan	6 July 2019
World Record	Clean & Jerk	Pak Jong-ju (PRK)	188 kg	Pattaya, Thailand	20 September 2019
World Record	Total	Chen Lijun (CHN)	339 kg	Ningbo, China	21 April 2019
Olympic Record	Snatch	Olympic Standard	151 kg	—	1 November 2018
Olympic Record	Clean & Jerk	Olympic Standard	181 kg	—	1 November 2018
Olympic Record	Total	Olympic Standard	328 kg	—	1 November 2018

== Results ==
Rank	Athlete	Nation	Group	Body weight	Snatch (kg)				Clean & Jerk (kg)				Total
Rank	Athlete	Nation	Group	Body weight	1	2	3	Result	1	2	3	Result	Total
1st place, gold medalist(s)	Chen Lijun	China	A	66.85	145	~~150~~	~~151~~	145	175	187	—	187 OR	332 OR
2nd place, silver medalist(s)	Luis Javier Mosquera	Colombia	A	66.85	148	~~151~~	151	151 AM	175	~~180~~	180	180	331 AM
3rd place, bronze medalist(s)	Mirko Zanni	Italy	A	66.95	145	~~150~~	~~150~~	145	~~172~~	~~177~~	177	177	322
4	Han Myeong-mok	South Korea	A	66.90	142	147	~~149~~	147	167	~~174~~	174	174	321
5	Talha Talib	Pakistan	A	66.95	144	147	150	150	~~166~~	166	170	170	320
6	Adkhamjon Ergashev	Uzbekistan	A	67.00	~~139~~	139	~~144~~	139	173	~~184~~	~~184~~	173	312
7	Mitsunori Konnai	Japan	A	66.95	~~135~~	~~135~~	135	135	165	172	~~178~~	172	307
8	Goga Chkheidze	Georgia	B	66.95	~~133~~	133	~~138~~	133	164	169	~~173~~	169	302
9	Deni	Indonesia	A	66.75	~~135~~	135	~~140~~	135	166	~~171~~	~~171~~	166	301
10	Jonathan Muñoz	Mexico	B	66.85	135	~~139~~	~~139~~	135	~~163~~	163	~~170~~	163	298
11	Tojonirina Andriantsitohaina	Madagascar	B	66.00	~~130~~	130	~~138~~	130	155	~~165~~	~~165~~	155	285
12	Ruben Katoatau	Kiribati	B	67.00	105	~~110~~	~~110~~	105	132	140	~~145~~	140	245
—	Muhammed Furkan Özbek	Turkey	A	66.70	142	~~145~~	~~145~~	142	~~173~~	~~173~~	~~173~~	—	—
—	Bernardin Matam	France	A	66.95	132	135	~~138~~	135	~~171~~	~~171~~	~~172~~	—	—

== New records ==
Clean & Jerk	187 kg	Chen Lijun (CHN)	OR
Total	331 kg	Luis Javier Mosquera (COL)	OR
Total	332 kg	Chen Lijun (CHN)	OR
