= Dudoglo =

Dudoglo is a Moldovan surname. Notable people with the surname include:

- Alexandru Dudoglo (born 1989), Moldovan weightlifter
- Ghenadie Dudoglo (born 1986), Moldovan weightlifter
- Iurie Dudoglo (born 1991), Moldovan weightlifter
