= Weightlifting at the 2017 National Games of China =

Weightlifting was part of the 2017 National Games of China held in Tianjin. Men competed in eight and women in seven weight classes. Since the beginning of 2017 the International Weightlifting Federation holds an equal number of men's and women's classes with the introduction of the women's 90 kg category. As of August 2017 the Chinese Weightlifting Association had not yet followed suit.

The competition program at the National Games mirrors that of the Olympic Games as only medals for the total achieved are awarded, but not for individual lifts in either the snatch or clean and jerk. Likewise an athlete failing to register a snatch result cannot advance to the clean and jerk.

== Medal summary ==
=== Table ===
Rank	Province	Gold	Silver	Bronze	Total
1	Hunan	4	0	0	4
2	Hubei	3	2	1	6
3	Fujian	2	1	4	7
4	PLA	1	2	0	3
5	Shandong	1	1	0	2
6	Tianjin	1	0	1	2
7	Anhui	1	0	0	1
7	Beijing	1	0	0	1
7	Zhejiang	1	0	0	1
10	Guangdong	0	2	2	4
11	Chongqing	0	1	1	2
11	Liaoning	0	1	1	2
13	Guangxi	0	1	0	1
13	Henan	0	1	0	1
13	Jilin	0	1	0	1
13	Shanxi	0	1	0	1
13	Sichuan	0	1	0	1
18	Hainan	0	0	1	1
18	Inner Mongolia	0	0	1	1
18	Jiangxi	0	0	1	1
18	Shaanxi	0	0	1	1
18	Shanghai	0	0	1	1
Totals (22 entries)		15	15	15	45

=== Men ===
Event	Gold		Silver		Bronze	
56 kg	Li Fabin; PLA (Fujian)	287 kg	Wu Jingbiao; PLA (Fujian)	283 kg	Meng Cheng; Hainan	283 kg
62 kg	Chen Lijun; Hunan	321 kg	Huang Minhao; Fujian	313 kg	Huang Zhiyong; Jiangxi	308 kg
69 kg	Shi Zhiyong; Zhejiang	358 kg	Liao Hui; PLA (Hubei)	354 kg	Wu Chao; Tianjin	342 kg
77 kg	Lü Xiaojun; Tianjin	366 kg	Zhong Guoshun; Chongqing	354 kg	Li Dayin; Chongqing	352 kg
85 kg	Tian Tao; Hubei	375 kg	Liu Jiawen; Guangdong	368 kg	Zhao Yongchao; Fujian	364 kg
94 kg	Liu Hao; Hubei	387 kg	Tian Fuxuan; Hubei	379 kg	Zhang Huacong; Fujian	378 kg
105 kg	Yang Zhe; Shandong	408 kg	Wu Changsheng; Guangxi	387 kg	Zhang Xiliang; Hebei	386 kg
105+ kg	Ai Yunan; Beijing	436 kg	Sun Haibo; Jilin	435 kg	Cui Pengju; Inner Mongolia	409 kg

=== Women ===
Event	Gold		Silver		Bronze	
48 kg	Hou Zhihui; Hunan	208 kg	Zeng Mei; Sichuan	204 kg	Zhang Rong; Fujian	203 kg
53 kg	Liao Qiuyun; Hunan	222 kg	Li Yajun; Guangdong	221 kg	Chen Yanling; Guangdong	217 kg
58 kg	Chai Lina; Fujian	238 kg	Zhou Jun; Hubei	234 kg	Chen Guiming; Shaanxi	230 kg
63 kg	Deng Wei; Fujian	251 kg	Long Dingling; Henan	244 kg	Zhou Xiaojing; Guangdong	241 kg
69 kg	Xiang Yanmei; Hunan	258 kg	Luan Yinxue; Liaoning	250 kg	Wu Linying; Shanghai	250 kg
75 kg	Wang Zhouyu; Hubei	265 kg	Zhang Qian; Shanxi	254 kg	Zhao Chenchen; Liaoning	253 kg
75+ kg	Meng Suping; Anhui	329 kg	Zhou Xiaoman; Shandong	326 kg	Li Jiaqi; Fujian	302 kg
