= 2013 World Weightlifting Championships – Men's 62 kg =

The men's competition in the –62 kg division was held on 22 October 2013 in Centennial Hall, Wrocław, Poland.

== Schedule ==
Date	Time	Event
22 October 2013	14:00	Group B
22 October 2013	19:55	Group A

== Medalists ==
Event	Gold		Silver		Bronze	
Snatch	Kim Un-guk (PRK)	150 kg	Chen Lijun (CHN)	146 kg	Óscar Figueroa (COL)	139 kg
Clean & Jerk	Óscar Figueroa (COL)	177 kg	Chen Lijun (CHN)	175 kg	Kim Un-guk (PRK)	170 kg
Total	Chen Lijun (CHN)	321 kg	Kim Un-guk (PRK)	320 kg	Óscar Figueroa (COL)	316 kg

== Records ==
Prior to this competition, the existing world records were as follows.

World Record	Snatch	Shi Zhiyong (CHN)	153 kg	İzmir, Turkey	28 June 2002
World Record	Clean & Jerk	Le Maosheng (CHN)	182 kg	Busan, South Korea	2 October 2002
World Record	Total	Kim Un-guk (PRK)	327 kg	London, United Kingdom	30 July 2012

== Results ==
Rank	Athlete	Group	Body weight	Snatch (kg)				Clean & Jerk (kg)				Total
Rank	Athlete	Group	Body weight	1	2	3	Rank	1	2	3	Rank	Total
1st place, gold medalist(s)	Chen Lijun (CHN)	A	61.72	138	143	146	2nd place, silver medalist(s)	~~173~~	~~173~~	175	2nd place, silver medalist(s)	321
2nd place, silver medalist(s)	Kim Un-guk (PRK)	A	61.63	145	150	~~154~~	1st place, gold medalist(s)	170	~~173~~	~~173~~	3rd place, bronze medalist(s)	320
3rd place, bronze medalist(s)	Óscar Figueroa (COL)	A	61.92	135	139	~~141~~	3rd place, bronze medalist(s)	175	177	~~183~~	1st place, gold medalist(s)	316
4	Francisco Mosquera (COL)	A	61.48	~~130~~	130	~~135~~	5	165	~~170~~	~~170~~	4	295
5	Ivaylo Filev (BUL)	A	61.83	133	~~135~~	~~135~~	4	160	~~164~~	~~165~~	7	293
6	Majid Askari (IRI)	A	61.35	128	~~132~~	~~133~~	7	160	~~165~~	~~165~~	5	288
7	Yoichi Itokazu (JPN)	A	61.63	~~127~~	127	~~131~~	8	~~160~~	160	~~167~~	6	287
8	Ruslan Makarov (UZB)	A	61.41	120	123	125	9	151	155	~~160~~	8	280
9	Thawatchai Phonchiangsa (THA)	B	61.82	115	117	119	11	150	155	~~160~~	9	274
10	Antonio Vázquez (MEX)	B	61.66	110	115	~~118~~	15	144	148	151	10	266
11	Erik Herrera (ECU)	B	61.59	~~114~~	~~114~~	114	16	145	150	~~153~~	11	264
12	Dilli Senthamizh Selvan (IND)	B	61.72	112	116	118	12	140	145	~~147~~	12	263
13	Iván García (ESP)	B	61.83	110	~~116~~	116	14	135	140	145	13	261
14	Noriyasu Ban (JPN)	B	61.38	112	115	117	13	~~141~~	~~141~~	141	15	258
15	Sakda Meeboon (THA)	B	61.52	97	102	108	17	135	140	144	14	252
—	Ghenadie Dudoglo (MDA)	A	61.54	~~122~~	122	~~125~~	10	~~145~~	~~145~~	~~145~~	—	—
—	Ahmed Saad (EGY)	A	61.66	125	130	~~132~~	6	~~160~~	~~160~~	~~160~~	—	—
DQ	Valentin Hristov (AZE)	A	61.17	136	139	141	—	170	~~176~~	~~176~~	—	—
