= Chen Lijun =

Chinese weightlifter (born 1993)

Personal information
- Nationality: Chinese
- Born: 8 February 1993 (age 33) Yiyang, China
- Height: 1.62 m (5 ft 4 in)
- Weight: 66.95 kg (148 lb)

Sport
- Country: China
- Sport: Weightlifting
- Event: –67 kg
- Club: Hunan Province

Achievements and titles
- Personal bests: Snatch: 154 kg (2019); Clean and jerk: 187 kg (2019); Total: 339 kg (2019)
Medal record
Representing China
Olympic Games
Gold medal – first place	2020 Tokyo	–67 kg
World Championships
Gold medal – first place	2013 Wrocław	–62 kg
Gold medal – first place	2015 Houston	–62 kg
Gold medal – first place	2018 Ashgabat	–67 kg
Gold medal – first place	2019 Pattaya	–67 kg
Gold medal – first place	2023 Riyadh	–67 kg
Silver medal – second place	2022 Bogotá	–67 kg
Asian Games
Gold medal – first place	2022 Hangzhou	–67 kg
Silver medal – second place	2014 Incheon	–62 kg
Asian Championships
Gold medal – first place	2019 Ningbo	–67 kg
Gold medal – first place	2020 Tashkent	–67 kg
Silver medal – second place	2023 Jinju	–61 kg
Junior World Championships
Gold medal – first place	2010 Sofia	–62 kg
National Games of China
Gold medal – first place	2013 Liaoning	–62 kg
Gold medal – first place	2017 Tianjin	–62 kg
Gold medal – first place	2021 Shaanxi	–67 kg

Chen Lijun (Chinese 谌利军; born 8 February 1993) is a Chinese weightlifter, Olympic Champion, five-time world champion and two-time Asian champion competing in the 62 kg division until 2018 and 67 kg starting in 2018 after the International Weightlifting Federation reorganized the categories.

== Career ==
=== Olympics ===
He competed at the 2016 Summer Olympics in the 62 kg division but was forced to withdraw from the competition after his second snatch attempt due to legs cramps.

In 2021 at the 2020 Summer Olympics, he won the gold medal in the Men's 67 kg category, lifting 145 kg in the Snatch and 187 kg in the Clean and Jerk for a 332 kg total, with new Olympic records set in the clean and jerk, and overall total.

=== World Championships ===
He competed at the 2013 World Championships in the Men's 62 kg class, lifting 146 kg in the Snatch and 175 kg in the Clean and Jerk for a 321 kg total, winning silver medals in the snatch and the clean & jerk and a gold medal in the total.

In 2015, he competed at the 2015 World Championships in the 62 kg class, lifting 150 kg in the snatch and a world record 183 kg in the clean & jerk for a world record 333 kg total, earning a silver medal in the Snatch and gold medals in the Clean and Jerk and total.

In 2018, the IWF restructured the weight classes and he competed in the 67 kg category as the 2018 World Championships. Coming into the competition he was the heavy favorite to win, and after the snatch portion he was in second place, 2 kg behind the snatch gold medalist Huang Minhao. In the clean & jerk portion he successfully lifted 182 kg in his second attempt giving him a total world record of 332 kg and his third World Championships win.

== Major results ==
Year	Venue	Weight	Snatch (kg)				Clean & Jerk (kg)				Total	Rank
Year	Venue	Weight	1	2	3	Rank	1	2	3	Rank	Total	Rank
Olympic Games
2016	Rio de Janeiro, Brazil	62 kg	~~143~~	~~143~~	—	—	—	—	—	—	—	—
2021	Tokyo, Japan	67 kg	145	~~150~~	~~151~~	5	175	187 OR	—	1	332 OR	1st place, gold medalist(s)
World Championships
2013	Wrocław, Poland	62 kg	138	143	146	2nd place, silver medalist(s)	~~173~~	~~173~~	175	2nd place, silver medalist(s)	321	1st place, gold medalist(s)
2015	Houston, United States	62 kg	145	150	~~152~~	1st place, gold medalist(s)	175	179	183 WR	1st place, gold medalist(s)	333 WR	1st place, gold medalist(s)
2018	Ashgabat, Turkmenistan	67 kg	145	150	~~153~~	2nd place, silver medalist(s)	178	182	~~185~~	1st place, gold medalist(s)	332 WR	1st place, gold medalist(s)
2019	Pattaya, Thailand	67 kg	145	150	~~153~~	3rd place, bronze medalist(s)	178	184	187 WR	2nd place, silver medalist(s)	337	1st place, gold medalist(s)
2022	Bogotá, Colombia	67 kg	145	148	~~150~~	1st place, gold medalist(s)	171	~~176~~	176	6	324	2nd place, silver medalist(s)
2023	Riyadh, Saudi Arabia	67 kg	145	150	153	1st place, gold medalist(s)	175	180	—	1st place, gold medalist(s)	333	1st place, gold medalist(s)
Asian Games
2014	Incheon, South Korea	62 kg	140	143	~~145~~	2	~~173~~	173	178	2	321	2nd place, silver medalist(s)
2023	Hangzhou, China	67 kg	~~145~~	145	150 GR	1	175	~~180~~	180	1	330 GR	1st place, gold medalist(s)
Asian Championships
2019	Ningbo, China	67 kg	147	151	154 WR	1st place, gold medalist(s)	178	185 WR	—	1st place, gold medalist(s)	339 CWR	1st place, gold medalist(s)
2020	Tashkent, Uzbekistan	67 kg	145	150	153	2nd place, silver medalist(s)	171	177	180	1st place, gold medalist(s)	333	1st place, gold medalist(s)
2023	Jinju, South Korea	61 kg	137	~~142~~	142	2nd place, silver medalist(s)	168	~~173~~	~~173~~	2nd place, silver medalist(s)	310	2nd place, silver medalist(s)
