= Weightlifting at the 2019 Pan American Games – Men's 61 kg =

Weightlifting – Men's 61kg at the 2019 Pan American Games
- Venue: Coliseo Mariscal Caceres
- Dates: 27 July
- Competitors: 8 from 7 nations

Medalists
| Gold medal | Francisco Mosquera | Colombia |
| Silver medal | Jhon Serna | Colombia |
| Bronze medal | Antonio Vázquez | Mexico |

The men's 61 kg competition of the weightlifting events at the 2019 Pan American Games in Lima, Peru, was held on 27 July at the Coliseo Mariscal Caceres.

Each lifter performed in both the snatch and clean and jerk lifts, with the final score being the sum of the lifter's best result in each. The athlete received three attempts in each of the two lifts; the score for the lift was the heaviest weight successfully lifted. This weightlifting event was the lightest men's event at the weightlifting competition, limiting competitors to a maximum of 61 kilograms of body mass.

== Results ==
8 athletes from seven countries took part.

| Rank | Athlete | Nation | Group | Snatch (kg) | | | | Clean & Jerk (kg) | | | | Total |
| Rank | Athlete | Nation | Group | 1 | 2 | 3 | Result | 1 | 2 | 3 | Result | Total |
|---|---|---|---|---|---|---|---|---|---|---|---|---|
| 1st place, gold medalist(s) | Francisco Mosquera | Colombia | A | 128 | ~~132~~ | 132 | 132 | 165 | 170 | ~~175~~ | 170 | 302 |
| 2nd place, silver medalist(s) | Jhon Serna | Colombia | A | 123 | 127 | ~~130~~ | 127 | 165 | 168 | 170 | 170 | 297 |
| 3rd place, bronze medalist(s) | Antonio Vázquez | Mexico | A | 120 | 123 | ~~125~~ | 123 | 163 | ~~171~~ | ~~171~~ | 163 | 283 |
| 4 | Luis Garcia | Dominican Republic | A | ~~121~~ | 121 | ~~125~~ | 121 | 155 | ~~160~~ | 160 | 160 | 281 |
| 5 | Cristhian Zurita | Ecuador | A | 125 | ~~130~~ | ~~130~~ | 125 | 147 | 151 | ~~154~~ | 151 | 276 |
| 6 | Arley Calderón | Cuba | A | 115 | ~~120~~ | ~~120~~ | 115 | 150 | 155 | ~~160~~ | 155 | 270 |
| 7 | Marcos Rojas | Peru | A | 110 | 114 | 116 | 116 | 145 | ~~150~~ | ~~152~~ | 145 | 261 |
| 8 | Julio Salamanca | El Salvador | A | 105 | ~~110~~ | ~~110~~ | 105 | 135 | 137 | ~~140~~ | 137 | 242 |

== New records ==
| Clean & Jerk | 170 kg | Francisco Mosquera (COL) | PR |
