= Lee Sang-yeon =

South Korean weightlifter (born 1995)

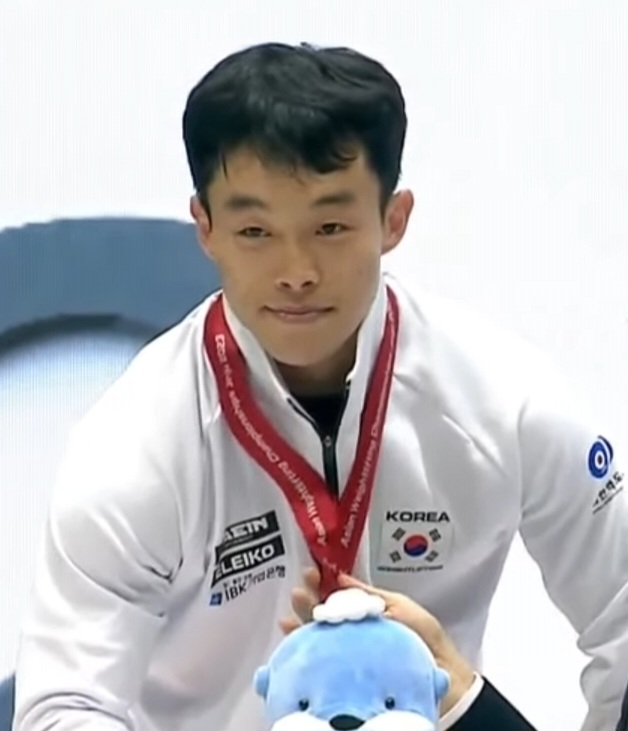
- Lee Sang-yeon in 2023

Personal information
- Nationality: Korean
- Born: March 6, 1995 (age 31)
- Weight: 67.00 kg (147.71 lb)

Sport
- Country: South Korea
- Sport: Weightlifting
- Event: –67 kg
Medal record
Men's weightlifting
Representing South Korea
Asian Games
Bronze medal – third place	2022 Hangzhou	–67 kg
Asian Championships
Silver medal – second place	2023 Jinju	-67 kg
World University Championships
Silver medal – second place	2016 Mérida	-69 kg

Lee Sang-yeon (Korean: 이상연; born March 6, 1995) is a South Korean male weightlifter currently competing in the men's 67 kg category.

Lee currently holds the Korean national record in the clean and jerk, lifting 182 kg.

== Major results ==
Year	Venue	Weight	Snatch (kg)				Clean & Jerk (kg)				Total	Rank
Year	Venue	Weight	1	2	3	Rank	1	2	3	Rank	Total	Rank
Representing South Korea
World Championships
2023	Riyadh, Saudi Arabia	67 kg	130	~~135~~	~~135~~	10	176	~~181~~	~~181~~	3rd place, bronze medalist(s)	306	5
2022	Bogotá, Colombia	67 kg	~~135~~	~~135~~	136	11	~~178~~	178	~~182~~	4	314	6
2018	Ashgabat, Turkmenistan	67 kg	140	~~144~~	~~144~~	7	~~170~~	~~170~~	~~170~~	—	—	—
Asian Games
2023	Hangzhou, China	67 kg	132	~~137~~	137	6	175	178	180	2	317	3rd place, bronze medalist(s)
Asian Championships
2023	Jinju, South Korea	67 kg	133	136	139	4	175	~~182~~	~~182~~	1st place, gold medalist(s)	314	2nd place, silver medalist(s)
Summer Universiade
2017	New Taipei, Taiwan	69 kg	142	~~146~~	~~146~~	5	168	~~174~~	~~174~~	7	310	4
World University Championships
2016	Mérida, Mexico	69 kg	133	138	~~141~~	2nd place, silver medalist(s)	170	175	~~177~~	2nd place, silver medalist(s)	313	2nd place, silver medalist(s)
