= Óscar Figueroa (weightlifter) =

Colombian weightlifter (born 1983)

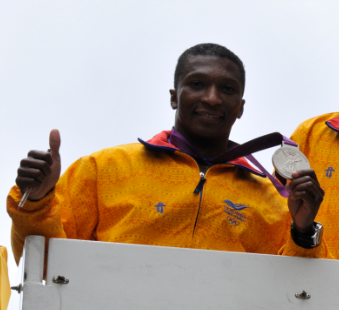
- Oscar Figueroa with the silver medal won at the 2012 Olympics

Personal information
- Full name: Oscar Albeiro Figueroa Mosquera
- Nationality: Colombian
- Born: 27 April 1983 (age 43) Zaragoza, Colombia
- Education: Santiago de Cali University
- Height: 1.61 m (5 ft 3 in)
- Weight: 66.20 kg (145.9 lb)

Sport
- Country: Colombia
- Sport: Olympic weightlifting
- Event: –67 kg
- Coached by: Jaiber Manjarres, Oswaldo Pinilla

Achievements and titles
- Personal bests: Snatch: 142 kg (2016); Clean and jerk: 178 kg (2018); Total: 318 kg (2016)
Medal record
Representing Colombia
Men's weightlifting
Olympic Games
Gold medal – first place	2016 Rio de Janeiro	62 kg
Silver medal – second place	2012 London	62 kg
World Championships
Silver medal – second place	2006 Santo Domingo	62 kg
Bronze medal – third place	2013 Wrocław	62 kg
Bronze medal – third place	2015 Houston	62 kg
Pan American Games
Gold medal – first place	2011 Gualadajara	62 kg
Gold medal – first place	2015 Toronto	62 kg
Pan American Championships
Gold medal – first place	2008 Callao	62 kg
Central American and Caribbean Games
Silver medal – second place	2006 Cartagena	62 kg

Oscar Albeiro Figueroa Mosquera (born 27 April 1983) is a retired Colombian weightlifter, and a gold medallist competing in the 62 kg category until 2018 and 67 kg starting in 2018 after the International Weightlifting Federation reorganized the categories. He was born in the rural township of Zaragoza, located in Cartago, Valle del Cauca, Colombia.

He initially retired from the sport after the 2016 Summer Olympics, but returned to international competition and competed at the 2018 World Weightlifting Championships. He formally announced his retirement again in November 2019.

== Career ==
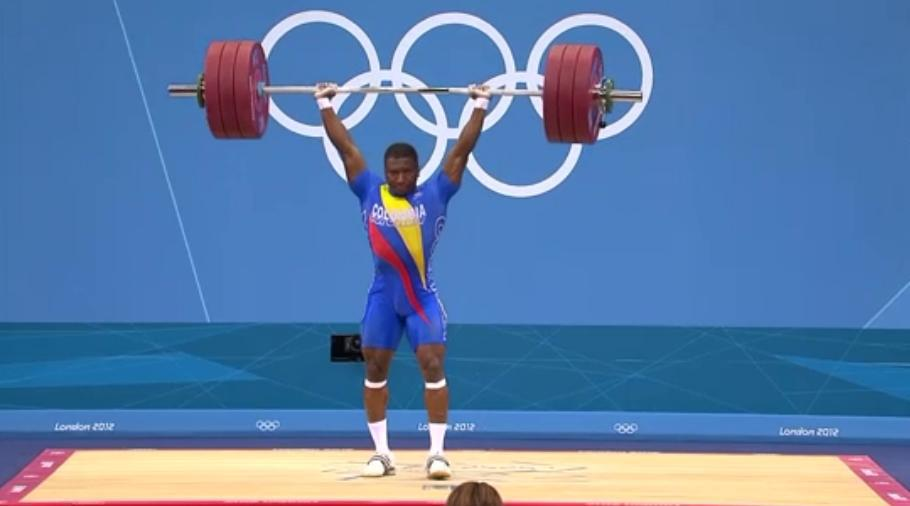
Figueroa lifting an Olympic Record 177 kg at the 2012 Olympics

=== Olympics ===
At the 2004 Summer Olympics he ranked 5th in the snatch as well as the clean & jerk in the 56 kg category, lifting a total of 280 kg, and finished 5th overall.

In the Beijing 2008 Summer Olympics, Figueroa failed to make a lift in the snatch category, he was unable to lift the bar from the floor in all three attempts. After the competition, it was discovered that he had a c6/7 cervical hernia which weakened his right hand. He left the Olympics without posting a result and had surgery to correct the hernia.

In his return to the Olympics after his injury, he placed 3rd after the snatch portion of the competition with a lift of 140 kg. After failing to make his first two lifts in the clean & jerk portion, he successfully completed an Olympic Record lift of 177 kg. This gave him a total of 317 kg; bronze medalist Eko Yuli Irawan also had the same total, but Figueroa had a lighter body weight (61.76 kg vs 61.98 kg) and won the silver medal.

Earlier in 2016 Figueroa had surgery to repair his chronic back pain caused by a lumbar hernia, and returned to the Olympics hoping to win gold. On August 8, 2016, Figueroa finally won gold in the 62 kg division with a total of 318 kg. After attempting and failing to lift 179 kg to set a new Olympic Record, Figueroa took off his shoes and placed them on the platform, signaling his immediate retirement from the sport. On November 26, 2019, Oscar Figueroa formally announced his retirement from weightlifting competitions in a press conference.

=== World Championships ===
Figueroa participated in the men's -62 kg class at the 2006 World Weightlifting Championships and won the silver medal, finishing behind Qiu Le. He snatched 137 kg and jerked an additional 160 kg for a total of 297 kg, 11 kg behind winner Qiu.

He ranked 4th in the 62 kg category at the 2007 World Weightlifting Championships.

=== Failure to Report Whereabouts ===
On April 12, 2019, the International Weightlifting Federation (IWF) reported that Figueroa was not allowed to participate in multiple weightlifting events. This was due to Figueroa failing to report his whereabouts in a timely manner so the IWF could perform surprise doping tests as required by international anti-doping regulations. It was noted this failure-to-report did not mean Figueroa was involved in any doping cases opened by the IWF. When interviewed, Figueroa reported he failed to send them due to human error. He also reported that while he was prevented from participating in the 2020 Pan American Championship, he was not impeded from other competition that could help qualify him for the 2020 Tokyo Olympic Games.

== Major results ==
Year	Venue	Weight	Snatch (kg)				Clean & Jerk (kg)				Total	Rank
Year	Venue	Weight	1	2	3	Rank	1	2	3	Rank	Total	Rank
Representing Colombia
Olympic Games
2004	Athens, Greece	56 kg	120.0	125.0	~~127.5~~	5	145.0	150.0	155.0	5	280.0	5
2008	Beijing, China	62 kg	~~128~~	~~128~~	~~128~~	—N/a	—	—	—	—N/a	—N/a	—N/a
2012	London, United Kingdom	62 kg	137	140	~~142~~	3	~~177~~	~~177~~	177 OR	1	317	2nd place, silver medalist(s)
2016	Rio de Janeiro, Brazil	62 kg	137	142 AM	~~145~~	1	172	176	~~179~~	1	318 AM	1st place, gold medalist(s)
World Championships
2006	Santo Domingo, Dominican Republic	62 kg	132	137	~~141~~	2nd place, silver medalist(s)	160	~~164~~	~~164~~	5	297	2nd place, silver medalist(s)
2007	Chiang Mai, Thailand	62 kg	135	~~140~~	~~140~~	6	~~160~~	160	~~165~~	8	295	4
2009	Goyang, South Korea	62 kg	135	139	~~141~~	4	~~165~~	165	168	5	307	4
2011	Paris, France	62 kg	135	138	~~140~~	6	~~170~~	170	~~175~~	4	308	4
2013	Wrocław, Poland	62 kg	135	139	~~141~~	3rd place, bronze medalist(s)	175	177	~~183~~	1st place, gold medalist(s)	316	3rd place, bronze medalist(s)
2014	Almaty, Kazakhstan	62 kg	~~135~~	~~135~~	~~135~~	—N/a	—	—	—	—N/a	—N/a	—N/a
2015	Houston, United States	62 kg	135	~~140~~	140	3rd place, bronze medalist(s)	175	~~180~~	~~180~~	3rd place, bronze medalist(s)	315	3rd place, bronze medalist(s)
2018	Ashgabat, Turkmenistan	67 kg	140	~~145~~	~~145~~	8	~~176~~	178	~~181~~	3rd place, bronze medalist(s)	318	5
2019	Pattaya, Thailand	67 kg	137	~~140~~	~~140~~	17	176	~~181~~	~~181~~	5	313	10
Pan American Games
2011	Guadalajara, Mexico	62 kg	132	135	137	1	165	171	175	1	312	1st place, gold medalist(s)
2015	Toronto, Canada	62 kg	~~130~~	130	135	2	170	175	—	1	310	1st place, gold medalist(s)
2019	Lima, Peru	67 kg	~~135~~	135	~~138~~	2	—	—	—	—N/a	—N/a	—N/a
