= Francisco Mosquera =

Colombian weightlifter (born 1992)

Personal information
- Full name: Francisco Antonio Mosquera Valencia
- Nickname: Pacho
- Nationality: Colombian
- Born: 1 April 1992 (age 34)
- Weight: 67.00 kg (148 lb)

Sport
- Country: Colombia
- Sport: Weightlifting
- Events: 61 kg; 65 kg; 67 kg
- Club: Bolivar
- Coached by: Oswaldo Pinilla

Achievements and titles
- Personal bests: Snatch: 139 kg (2026, Panama City); Clean & Jerk: 181 kg (2026, Panama City); Total: 320 kg AM (2026, Panama City)
Medal record
Representing Colombia
Men's weightlifting
Big (Total)
Event	1st	2nd	3rd
World Championships	2	2	1
Junior World Championships	0	0	1
Pan American Games	1	1	0
Pan American Championships	6	2	0
South American Games	3	0	0
Bolivarian Games	2	0	0
Total	14	5	2
Big and small medals
Event	1st	2nd	3rd
World Championships	3	8	2
Junior World Championships	0	1	2
Pan American Games	1	1	0
Pan American Championships	17	7	0
CAC Games	5	1	0
South American Games	3	0	0
Bolivarian Games	8	0	0
Total	37	18	4
World Championships
Gold medal – first place	2017 Anaheim	62 kg
Gold medal – first place	2022 Bogotá	67 kg
Silver medal – second place	2015 Houston	62 kg
Silver medal – second place	2021 Tashkent	67 kg
Bronze medal – third place	2019 Pattaya	61 kg
Pan American Games
Gold medal – first place	2019 Lima	61 kg
Silver medal – second place	2015 Toronto	62 kg
Pan American Championships
Gold medal – first place	2013 Margarita Island	62 kg
Gold medal – first place	2014 Santo Domingo	62 kg
Gold medal – first place	2016 Cartagena	62 kg
Gold medal – first place	2020 Santo Domingo	61 kg
Gold medal – first place	2021 Guayaquil	67 kg
Gold medal – first place	2026 Panama City	65 kg
Silver medal – second place	2022 Bogotá	67 kg
Silver medal – second place	2025 Cali	65 kg
Central American and Caribbean Games
Gold medal – first place	2014 Veracruz	62 kg S
Gold medal – first place	2014 Veracruz	62 Kg CJ
Gold medal – first place	2018 Barranquilla	62 kg S
Gold medal – first place	2023 San Salvador	67 kg S
Gold medal – first place	2023 San Salvador	67 kg CJ
Silver medal – second place	2018 Barranquilla	62 Kg CJ
South American Games
Gold medal – first place	2014 Santiago	62 kg
Gold medal – first place	2022 Asunción	67 kg
Gold medal – first place	2026 Santa Fe	65 kg
Bolivarian Games
Gold medal – first place	2013 Trujillo	62 kg S
Gold medal – first place	2013 Trujillo	62 Kg CJ
Gold medal – first place	2013 Trujillo	62 Kg
Gold medal – first place	2017 Santa Marta	62 kg S
Gold medal – first place	2017 Santa Marta	62 Kg CJ
Gold medal – first place	2017 Santa Marta	62 Kg
Gold medal – first place	2022 Valledupar	67 kg S
Gold medal – first place	2022 Valledupar	67 Kg CJ
Junior World Championships
Bronze medal – third place	2012 Antigua Guatemala	62 kg

Francisco Antonio Mosquera Valencia (born 1 April 1992) is a Colombian weightlifter, former World Champion, three-time Pan American Champion and Pan American Games Champion competing in the 62 kg category until 2018 and 61 kg starting in 2018 after the International Weightlifting Federation reorganized the categories.

== Career ==
=== Injury before Olympics ===
In 2016 he tore the Patellar tendon in his left knee 10 days before the beginning of the 2016 Summer Olympics and was unable to compete. His recovery lasted 15 months and he was unable to compete until the 2017 Bolivarian Games, where he competed in the 62 kg division, winning the gold medal.

=== World Championships ===
Mosquera won the gold medal in the 62kg division at the 2017 World Weightlifting Championships in Anaheim, this makes him the second Colombian weightlifter to win a gold medal at the World Weightlifting Championships after Leydi Solís also at the 2017 World Weightlifting Championships. He also won a silver medal in the 62kg division at the 2015 World Weightlifting Championships in Houston.

== Achievements ==
Year	Venue	Weight	Snatch (kg)				Clean & Jerk (kg)				Total	Rank
Year	Venue	Weight	1	2	3	Rank	1	2	3	Rank	Total	Rank
Representing Colombia
World Championships
2013	Wrocław, Poland	62 kg	~~130~~	130	~~135~~	5	165	~~170~~	~~170~~	4	295	4
2015	Houston, United States	62 kg	135	140	~~142~~	2nd place, silver medalist(s)	170	175	~~177~~	2nd place, silver medalist(s)	315	2nd place, silver medalist(s)
2017	Anaheim, United States	62 kg	130	~~135~~	~~136~~	7	166	170	~~172~~	1st place, gold medalist(s)	300	1st place, gold medalist(s)
2018	Ashgabat, Turkmenistan	61 kg	130	135 AM	~~137~~	6	~~167~~	169	~~172~~	3rd place, bronze medalist(s)	304 AM	4
2019	Pattaya, Thailand	61 kg	130	~~135~~	~~135~~	6	167	~~172~~	172 AM	2nd place, silver medalist(s)	302	3rd place, bronze medalist(s)
2021	Tashkent, Uzbekistan	67 kg	137	~~141~~	~~141~~	6	175	179	~~181~~	2nd place, silver medalist(s)	316	2nd place, silver medalist(s)
2022	Bogotá, Colombia	67 kg	140	143	~~145~~	4	177	~~182~~	182	2nd place, silver medalist(s)	325	1st place, gold medalist(s)
2023	Riyadh, Saudi Arabia	67 kg	135	~~138~~	~~138~~	7	176	~~181~~	~~181~~	2nd place, silver medalist(s)	311	4
2025	Førde, Norway	65 kg	130	~~134~~	~~135~~	11	170	175	~~179~~	4	305	4
2026	Ningbo, China	65 kg	133	~~136~~	~~138~~	11	172	~~177~~	~~180~~	6	305	8
Pan American Games
2011	Guadalajara, Mexico	56 kg	113	115	117	—N/a	145	~~150~~	~~150~~	—N/a	262	4
2015	Toronto, Canada	62 kg	130	135	~~137~~	—N/a	170	~~175~~	~~175~~	—N/a	305	2nd place, silver medalist(s)
2019	Lima, Peru	61 kg	128	~~132~~	132	—N/a	165	170	~~175~~	—N/a	302	1st place, gold medalist(s)
Pan American Championships
2013	Margarita Island, Venezuela	62 kg	121	126	~~131~~	1st place, gold medalist(s)	160	~~167~~	~~167~~	1st place, gold medalist(s)	286	1st place, gold medalist(s)
2014	Santo Domingo, Dominican Republic	62 kg	121	124	~~127~~	1st place, gold medalist(s)	155	160	—	1st place, gold medalist(s)	284	1st place, gold medalist(s)
2016	Cartagena, Colombia	62 kg	130	135	~~140~~	1st place, gold medalist(s)	~~165~~	165	170	1st place, gold medalist(s)	305	1st place, gold medalist(s)
2019	Guatemala City, Guatemala	67 kg	120	~~125~~	~~125~~	9	141	—	—	10	261	9
2020	Santo Domingo, Dominican Republicz	61 kg	120	124	—	1st place, gold medalist(s)	151	156	—	1st place, gold medalist(s)	280	1st place, gold medalist(s)
2021	Guayaquil, Ecuador	67 kg	~~135~~	135	140	2nd place, silver medalist(s)	175	180	~~183~~	1st place, gold medalist(s)	320	1st place, gold medalist(s)
2022	Bogotá, Colombia	67 kg	~~133~~	~~134~~	135	2nd place, silver medalist(s)	170	177	~~181~~	2nd place, silver medalist(s)	312	2nd place, silver medalist(s)
2025	Cali, Colombia	65 kg	130	135	~~138~~	2nd place, silver medalist(s)	170	178	~~184~~	2nd place, silver medalist(s)	313	2nd place, silver medalist(s)
2026	Panama City, Panama	65 kg	132	~~136~~	139	1st place, gold medalist(s)	170	175	181	1st place, gold medalist(s)	320 AM	1st place, gold medalist(s)
Central American and Caribbean Games
2014	Veracruz, Mexico	62 kg	122	130	~~132~~	1st place, gold medalist(s)	161	168	171	1st place, gold medalist(s)	—N/a	—N/a
2018	Barranquilla, Colombia	62 kg	127	132	~~135~~	1st place, gold medalist(s)	165	170	~~172~~	2nd place, silver medalist(s)	—N/a	—N/a
2023	San Salvador, El Salvador	67 kg	133	~~136~~	137	1st place, gold medalist(s)	170	~~180~~	180	1st place, gold medalist(s)	—N/a	—N/a
South American Games
2014	Santiago, Chile	62 kg	125	128	~~130~~	—N/a	~~154~~	154	160	—N/a	288	1st place, gold medalist(s)
2022	Asunción, Paraguay	67 kg	132	137	141	—N/a	170	~~176~~	176	—N/a	317	1st place, gold medalist(s)
2026	Rosario, Argentina	65 kg	130	133	~~135~~	—N/a	165	~~170~~	~~170~~	—N/a	298	1st place, gold medalist(s)
Bolivarian Games
2013	Trujillo, Peru	62 kg	122	127	~~132~~	1st place, gold medalist(s)	~~155~~	155	157	1st place, gold medalist(s)	284	1st place, gold medalist(s)
2017	Santa Marta, Colombia	62 kg	126	131	~~135~~	1st place, gold medalist(s)	160	170	—	1st place, gold medalist(s)	301	1st place, gold medalist(s)
2022	Valledupar, Colombia	67 kg	~~132~~	133	138	1st place, gold medalist(s)	170	176	183	1st place, gold medalist(s)	—N/a	—N/a
Junior World Championships
2011	Penang, Malaysia	56 kg	~~108~~	~~108~~	~~108~~	—N/a	—	—	—	—N/a	—N/a	—N/a
2012	Antigua Guatemala, Guatemala	62 kg	122	126	128	3rd place, bronze medalist(s)	154	158	163	2nd place, silver medalist(s)	291	3rd place, bronze medalist(s)
Youth World Championships
2009	Chiang Mai, Thailand	56 kg	~~92~~	92	96	8	120	~~124~~	~~124~~	9	216	9
