= Weightlifting at the 2015 Pan American Games – Men's 62 kg =

Weightlifting – Men's 62kg at the 2015 Pan American Games
- Venue: Oshawa Sports Centre
- Dates: July 11
- Competitors: 5 from 4 nations

Medalists
Gold medal	Óscar Figueroa	Colombia
Silver medal	Francisco Mosquera	Colombia
Bronze medal	Jesús López	Venezuela

The men's 62 kg competition of the weightlifting events at the 2015 Pan American Games in Toronto, Canada, was held on July 11 at the Oshawa Sports Centre. The defending champion was Óscar Figueroa from Colombia.

Each lifter performed in both the snatch and clean and jerk lifts, with the final score being the sum of the lifter's best result in each. The athlete received three attempts in each of the two lifts; the score for the lift was the heaviest weight successfully lifted. This weightlifting event was the lightest men's event at the weightlifting competition, limiting competitors to a maximum of 62 kilograms of body mass.

== Schedule ==
All times are Eastern Daylight Time (UTC-4).

Date	Time	Round
July 11, 2015	19:00	Final

== Results ==
5 athletes from four countries took part.

Rank	Name	Country	Group	B.weight (kg)	Snatch (kg)	Clean & Jerk (kg)	Total (kg)
1st place, gold medalist(s)	Óscar Figueroa	Colombia	A	61.99	135	175	310
2nd place, silver medalist(s)	Francisco Mosquera	Colombia	A	61.66	135	170	305
3rd place, bronze medalist(s)	Jesús López	Venezuela	A	62.00	125	158	283
4	Julio Salamanca	El Salvador	A	61.30	120	155	275
5	Antonio Vazquez	Mexico	A	61.89	120	155	275
