= Ghenadie Dudoglo =

Moldovan weightlifter (1986–2026)

Personal information
- Nationality: Moldovan
- Born: 27 June 1986
- Died: 24 April 2026 (aged 39) France
- Weight: 61.50 kg (135.6 lb)

Sport
- Country: Moldova
- Sport: Weightlifting
- Team: National team
- Updated on 31 August 2016

Ghenadie Dudoglo (27 June 1986 – 24 April 2026) was a Moldovan weightlifter, who competed in the 62 kg category and represented Moldova at international competitions. He competed at world championships, including at the 2015 World Weightlifting Championships.

In 2015 the International Weightlifting Federation (IWF) suspended Ghenadie Dudoglo for anti-doping rule violation, after he returned a positive sample for anabolic agents (dehydrochlormethyltestosterone).

Dudoglo died on 24 April 2026 in France, at the age of 39.

== Major results ==
Year	Venue	Weight	Snatch (kg)				Clean & Jerk (kg)				Total	Rank
Year	Venue	Weight	1	2	3	Rank	1	2	3	Rank	Total	Rank
World Championships
2015	Houston, United States	62 kg	123	~~126~~	~~126~~	DSQ	143	147	~~149~~	DSQ	0	DSQ
2014	Almaty, Kazakhstan	62 kg	123	~~127~~	~~127~~	13	143	~~147~~	~~148~~	22	266	18
2013	Wrocław, Poland	62 kg	~~122~~	122	~~125~~	10	~~145~~	~~145~~	~~145~~	---	0	---
2011	Paris, France	62 kg	123	127	~~130~~	11	145	150	~~153~~	22	277	15
2010	Antalya, Turkey	56 kg	~~115~~	~~115~~	115	10	132	~~136~~	~~136~~	18	247	17
