= Adkhamjon Ergashev =

Uzbek weightlifter (born 1999)

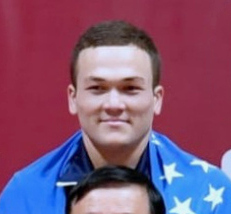
- Ergashev at the 2018 Asian Games

Personal information
- Born: 12 March 1999 (age 27) Navruzobod, Uzbekistan
- Height: 158 cm (5 ft 2 in)
- Weight: 66.90 kg (147.5 lb)

Sport
- Country: Uzbekistan
- Sport: Weightlifting
- Team: National team
- Coached by: Mansurbek Chashemov; Bakhrom Abdumalikov
Medal record
Representing Uzbekistan
Asian Games
Bronze medal – third place	2018 Jakarta	62 kg
Asian Championships
Gold medal – first place	2022 Manama	67 kg
Bronze medal – third place	2020 Tashkent	67 kg
Islamic Solidarity Games
Gold medal – first place	2021 Konya	67 kg S
Gold medal – first place	2021 Konya	67 kg T
Gold medal – first place	2025 Riyadh	65 kg C
Silver medal – second place	2021 Konya	67 kg C
Silver medal – second place	2025 Riyadh	65 kg T
Bronze medal – third place	2025 Riyadh	65 kg S
World Junior Championships
Gold medal – first place	2019 Suva	67 kg
Gold medal – first place	2018 Tashkent	62 kg
Silver medal – second place	2015 Wrocław	62 kg
Youth Olympic Games
Bronze medal – third place	2014 Nanjing	56 kg

Adkhamjon Ergashev (born 12 March 1999) is an Uzbek weightlifter competing in the 62 kg category until 2018, and the 61 kg and 67 kg categories starting in 2018 after the International Weightlifting Federation reorganized the categories.

== Career ==
He competed at the 2014 and 2015 World Weightlifting Championships, and won bronze medals at the 2014 Summer Youth Olympics and the 2018 Asian Games. Ergashev also won the 62 kg division at the 2016 IWF Youth World Championship.

At the 2018 World Weightlifting Championships he set 3 junior world records in the 61 kg class. At the 5th International Qatar Cup he competed in the 67 kg division, setting junior world records in the snatch and total.

He competed in the men's 67 kg event at the 2020 Summer Olympics in Tokyo, Japan.

== Major results ==
Year	Venue	Weight	Snatch (kg)				Clean & Jerk (kg)				Total	Rank
Year	Venue	Weight	1	2	3	Rank	1	2	3	Rank	Total	Rank
Representing Uzbekistan
Olympic Games
2021	Tokyo, Japan	67 kg	~~139~~	139	~~144~~	7	173	~~184~~	~~184~~	5	312	6
World Championships
2014	Almaty, Kazakhstan	62 kg	108	111	114	31	~~127~~	~~127~~	127	31	241	27
2015	Houston, United States	62 kg	117	119	122	25	148	152	156	14	278	19
2017	Anaheim, United States	62 kg	~~129~~	129	135	3rd place, bronze medalist(s)	~~157~~	157	~~164~~	8	292	4
2018	Ashgabat, Turkmenistan	61 kg	~~132~~	133	136 JWR	4	157	~~160~~	~~166~~	10	293 JWR	6
2019	Pattaya, Thailand	67 kg	143	146 JWR	~~151~~	4	173	179	182 JWR	3rd place, bronze medalist(s)	328 JWR	4
2026	Ningbo, China	65 kg	~~133~~	~~133~~	~~134~~	–	163	167	~~170~~	10	DNF	–
Asian Games
2018	Jakarta, Indonesia	62 kg	128	133	136	2	158	162	~~165~~	4	298	3rd place, bronze medalist(s)
Asian Championships
2016	Tashkent, Uzbekistan	62 kg	123	125	~~130~~	3rd place, bronze medalist(s)	~~152~~	~~152~~	~~153~~	–	DNF	–
2017	Ashgabat, Turkmenistan	62 kg	123	~~128~~	128	5	150	~~155~~	158	3rd place, bronze medalist(s)	286	4
2020	Tashkent, Uzbekistan	67 kg	~~140~~	~~140~~	140	5	170	176	~~181~~	3rd place, bronze medalist(s)	316	3rd place, bronze medalist(s)
2022	Manama, Bahrain	67 kg	134	~~138~~	138	1st place, gold medalist(s)	169	173	176	1st place, gold medalist(s)	314	1st place, gold medalist(s)
2023	Jinju, South Korea	67 kg	130	134	138	6	162	168	174	2nd place, silver medalist(s)	312	3rd place, bronze medalist(s)
Junior World Championships
2015	Wrocław, Poland	62 kg	118	121	124	2nd place, silver medalist(s)	148	151	~~157~~	2nd place, silver medalist(s)	275	2nd place, silver medalist(s)
2016	(Georgia (country)) Tbilisi, Georgia	62 kg	124	127	130	4	148	154	~~159~~	5	284	4
2018	Tashkent, Uzbekistan	62 kg	125	130	135	1st place, gold medalist(s)	155	160	~~165~~	1st place, gold medalist(s)	295	1st place, gold medalist(s)
2019	Suva, Fiji	67 kg	~~136~~	136	141	1st place, gold medalist(s)	167	171	173	1st place, gold medalist(s)	314	1st place, gold medalist(s)
Qatar Cup
2018	Doha, Qatar	67 kg	134	139	142	1st place, gold medalist(s)	163	168	~~171~~	3rd place, bronze medalist(s)	310	2nd place, silver medalist(s)
2019	Doha, Qatar	73 kg	136	~~141~~	~~141~~	8	167	174	–	6	310	6
