= Feng Lüdong =

Chinese weightlifter (born 1991)

Personal information
- Nationality: Chinese
- Born: 23 October 1991 (age 34)
- Weight: 66.80 kg (147 lb)

Sport
- Country: China
- Sport: Weightlifting
- Event: –67 kg
Medal record
Representing China
World Championships
| Silver medal – second place | 2019 Pattaya | –67 kg |
Asian Championships
| Silver medal – second place | 2019 Ningbo | –67 kg |

Feng Lüdong (born 23 October 1991) is a Chinese weightlifter, competing in the 69 kg division until 2018 and 73 kg and 67 kg starting in 2018 after the International Weightlifting Federation reorganized the categories.

== Career ==
In 2018 he competed at the 2018 World Weightlifting Championships in the 73 kg division, and won a bronze medal in the snatch portion. He competed at the 2019 Asian Weightlifting Championships winning a silver medal in the 67 kg division.

== Major results ==
| Year | Venue | Weight | Snatch (kg) | | | | Clean & Jerk (kg) | | | | Total | Rank |
| Year | Venue | Weight | 1 | 2 | 3 | Rank | 1 | 2 | 3 | Rank | Total | Rank |
Representing China
World Championships
| 2018 | Ashgabat, Turkmenistan | 73 kg | ~~155~~ | 155 | ~~162~~ | 3rd place, bronze medalist(s) | 175 | ~~180~~ | – | 18 | 330 | 13 |
| 2019 | Pattaya, Thailand | 67 kg | 148 | 153 | ~~156~~ | 1st place, gold medalist(s) | 175 | 180 | ~~183~~ | 4 | 333 | 2nd place, silver medalist(s) |
