= 2020 in weightlifting =

This article lists the main weightlifting events and their results for 2020.

== World weightlifting championships and cups ==
- January 27 – 31: Roma 2020 World Cup in (Italy) Rome
- March 14 – 21: 2020 IWF World Junior Weightlifting Championships in (Romania) Bucharest
- October 20 – 24: 2020 FISU World University Weightlifting Championships in (South Korea) Gangjin
- November 11 – 18: 2020 IWF World Youth Weightlifting Championships in (Peru) Lima

== Continental and regional weightlifting championships ==
- February 13 – 19: 2020 Asian Junior & Youth Weightlifting Championships in (Uzbekistan) Tashkent
- February 25 – 29: 2020 West Asian Weightlifting Championships in (United Arab Emirates) Dubai
- February 27 – March 3: 2020 East Asian Weightlifting Championships in (South Korea) Seoul (debut event)
- March 18 – 23: 2020 South American, Ibero-American & OPEN Senior Weightlifting Championships in (Colombia) Cali
- April 4 – 12: 2020 European Weightlifting Championships in (Russia) Moscow
- April 13 – 20: 2020 African Weightlifting Championships in (Mauritius) Côte d'Or
- April 16 – 25: 2020 Asian Weightlifting Championships in (Kazakhstan) Nur-Sultan
- April 17 – 24: 2020 Pan American Weightlifting Championships in (Dominican Republic) Santo Domingo
- April 21 – 25: 2020 Oceania Weightlifting Championships in Nauru (location TBA)
- September 10 – 20: 2020 European Junior & U23 Weightlifting Championships in (Finland) Rovaniemi
