= Deni (weightlifter) =

Indonesian weightlifter (born 1989)

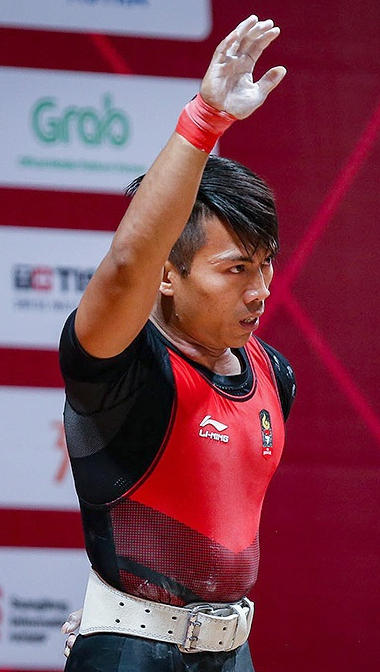
- Deni at the 2018 Asian Games

Personal information
- Born: 26 July 1989 (age 36) Bogor, Indonesia
- Height: 1.65 m (5 ft 5 in)

Sport
- Sport: Weightlifting
- Event: 69 kg
- Coached by: Hadi Wihardja; Dirja Wihardja; Supeni
Medal record
Men's weightlifting
Representing Indonesia
IWF World Cup
Bronze medal – third place	2019 Fuzhou	–67 kg
Summer Universiade
Gold medal – first place	2011 Shenzhen	69 kg
Islamic Solidarity Games
Gold medal – first place	2013 Palembang	69 kg
SEA Games
Gold medal – first place	2013 Naypyidaw	69 kg
Gold medal – first place	2017 Kuala Lumpur	69 kg
Gold medal – first place	2019 Philippines	67 kg
Silver medal – second place	2011 Jakarta-Palembang	69 kg
International Fajr Cup
Silver medal – second place	2020 Tehran	67 kg

Deni (born 26 July 1989) is an Indonesian weightlifter who competes in the 69 kg division. He placed 9th at the 2012 Olympics and 12th at the 2016 Olympics. He won gold medals at the 2011 Universiade, 2013 Islamic Solidarity Games, 2013 SEA Games, 2017 SEA Games, and 2019 SEA Games.

He represented Indonesia at the 2020 Summer Olympics in Tokyo, Japan. He competed in the men's 67 kg event. He placed 9th at the 2020 Olympics.
