= Yoichi Itokazu =

Japanese weightlifter (born 1991)

Personal information
- Nationality: Japanese
- Born: 24 May 1991 (age 35)
- Height: 1.6 m (5 ft 3 in)
- Weight: 64 kg (141 lb)

Sport
- Country: Japan
- Sport: Weightlifting
Medal record
Men's weightlifting
Representing Japan
World Championships
Silver medal – second place	2017 Anaheim	–62 kg

Yoichi Itokazu (糸数 陽一, Itokazu Yōichi; born 24 May 1991) is a Japanese weightlifter. He finished in 4th place in the men's 62 kg event at the 2016 Summer Olympics.
