= Mitsunori Konnai =

Japanese weightlifter (born 1996)

Personal information
- Born: 14 March 1996 (age 30)

Sport
- Country: Japan
- Sport: Weightlifting

Mitsunori Konnai (近内三孝, Kon'nai Mitsunori, born 14 March 1996) is a retired Japanese weightlifter. He competed in the men's 67 kg event at the 2020 Summer Olympics in Tokyo, Japan. Now,professional racing cyclist (競輪, Keirin).

He competed in the men's 69 kg event at the 2017 Summer Universiade held in Taipei, Taiwan. He also competed in the men's 69 kg event at the 2017 World Weightlifting Championships held in Anaheim, United States.

In 2018, he represented Japan in the men's 69 kg event at the 2018 Asian Games held in Jakarta, Indonesia.

In 2021, he finished in 6th place in the men's 67 kg event at the 2020 Asian Weightlifting Championships held in Tashkent, Uzbekistan.

In 2026 May 15, he made his debut as a racing cyclist at Utsunomiya Velodrome.
