= Han Myeong-mok =

South Korean weightlifter (born 1991)

Personal information
- Full name: Han Myeong-mok
- Born: 1 February 1991 (age 35) Masan, South Korea
- Height: 1.60 m (5 ft 3 in)
- Weight: 61.90 kg (136 lb)

Sport
- Country: South Korea
- Sport: Weightlifting
- Updated on 8 April 2017

Han Myeong-mok (Korean: 한명목; born February 1, 1991) is a South Korean male weightlifter, competing in the 62 kg category and representing South Korea at international competitions. He participated in the men's 62 kg event at the 2015 World Weightlifting Championships, and at the 2016 Summer Olympics, finishing in ninth position.

He competed in the men's 67 kg event at the 2020 Summer Olympics in Tokyo, Japan.

== Major results ==
Year	Venue	Weight	Snatch (kg)				Clean & Jerk (kg)				Total	Rank
Year	Venue	Weight	1	2	3	Rank	1	2	3	Rank	Total	Rank
World Championships
2015	Houston, United States	62 kg	~~133~~	~~133~~	133	8	~~154~~	154	~~158~~	21	287	10
