= Huang Minhao =

Chinese weightlifter (born 1992)

Personal information
- Nationality: Chinese
- Born: 21 August 1992 (age 33)
- Weight: 66.87 kg (147 lb)

Sport
- Country: China
- Sport: Weightlifting
- Event: –67 kg
Medal record
World Championships
| Silver medal – second place | 2018 Ashgabat | –67 kg |

Huang Minhao (Chinese: 黄闽豪; born 21 August 1992) is a Chinese weightlifter competing in the 62 kg category until 2018 and 67 kg starting in 2018 after the International Weightlifting Federation reorganized the categories.

== Career ==
He participated at the 2018 World Weightlifting Championships and won a silver medal in the 67 kg division.

== Major results ==
| Year | Venue | Weight | Snatch (kg) | | | | Clean & Jerk (kg) | | | | Total | Rank |
| Year | Venue | Weight | 1 | 2 | 3 | Rank | 1 | 2 | 3 | Rank | Total | Rank |
World Championships
| 2018 | Ashgabat, Turkmenistan | 67 kg | 148 | 152 | ~~154~~ | 1st place, gold medalist(s) | 166 | 171 | ~~175~~ | 9 | 323 | 2nd place, silver medalist(s) |
