= List of French records in Olympic weightlifting =

The following are the national records in Olympic weightlifting in France. Records are maintained in each weight class for the snatch lift, clean and jerk lift, and the total for both lifts by the French Weightlifting Federation (Fédération française d'Haltérophilie) (FFH).

== Current records ==
Key to tables: Awaiting ratification Not ratified or later rescinded by FFH

=== Men ===
Event	Record	Athlete	Date	Meet	Place	Ref
60 kg
Snatch	108 kg	Lukas Delamotte	13 June 2026	French Championships	Durstel, France	
Clean & Jerk	126 kg	Yannis Bacherot	13 December 2025		Strasbourg, France	
Total	233 kg	Lucas Gautier	17 May 2026		Franconville, France	
65 kg
Snatch	105 kg	Alexis Rossi	17 May 2026		Franconville, France	
Snatch	132 kg	Bernardin Matam	28 October 2026	World Championships	Ningbo, China	
Clean & Jerk	128 kg	Standard				
Clean & Jerk	158 kg	Bernardin Matam	28 October 2026	World Championships	Ningbo, China	
Total	230 kg	Alexis Rossi	17 May 2026		Franconville, France	
Total	290 kg	Bernardin Matam	28 October 2026	World Championships	Ningbo, China	
70 kg
Snatch						
Clean & Jerk						
Total						
75 kg
Snatch	129 kg	Bernardin Matam	1 September 2026	Mediterranean Games	San Giorgio Ionico, Italy	
Clean & Jerk	160 kg	Bernardin Matam	1 September 2026	Mediterranean Games	San Giorgio Ionico, Italy	
Total	289 kg	Bernardin Matam	1 September 2026	Mediterranean Games	San Giorgio Ionico, Italy	
85 kg
Snatch	119 kg	Standard				
Clean & Jerk	152 kg	Standard				
Total	271 kg	Standard				
95 kg
Snatch	126 kg	Standard				
Clean & Jerk	160 kg	Standard				
Total	286 kg	Standard				
110 kg
Snatch	165 kg	Benjamin Ferré	2 September 2026	Mediterranean Games	San Giorgio Ionico, Italy	
Clean & Jerk	208 kg	Benjamin Ferré	25 April 2026	European Championships	Batumi, Georgia	
Total	372 kg	Benjamin Ferré	25 April 2026	European Championships	Batumi, Georgia	
+110 kg
Snatch	163 kg	Benjamin Ferré	29 November 2025		Caen, France	
Clean & Jerk	211 kg	Benjamin Ferré	29 November 2025		Caen, France	
Total	374 kg	Benjamin Ferré	29 November 2025		Caen, France	

=== Women ===
Event	Record	Athlete	Date	Meet	Place	Ref
49 kg
Snatch	62 kg	Standard				
Clean & Jerk	78 kg	Standard				
Total	140 kg	Standard				
53 kg
Snatch	79 kg	Marielle Hertrich	13 June 2026	French Championships	Durstel, France	
Snatch	80 kg	Garance Rigaud	29 October 2026	World Championships	Ningbo, China	
Clean & Jerk	102 kg	Iris Bel	28 October 2025	European U23 Championships	Durrës, Albania	
Clean & Jerk	104 kg	Garance Rigaud	29 October 2026	World Championships	Ningbo, China	
Total	179 kg	Iris Bel	3 October 2025	World Championships	Førde, Norway	
Total	184 kg	Garance Rigaud	29 October 2026	World Championships	Ningbo, China	
57 kg
Snatch	70 kg	Standard				
Clean & Jerk	89 kg	Standard				
Total	159 kg	Standard				
61 kg
Snatch	90 kg	Maëlyn Michel	31 August 2026	Mediterranean Games	San Giorgio Ionico, Italy	
Snatch	102 kg	Maëlyn Michel	1 November 2026	World Championships	Ningbo, China	
Clean & Jerk	105 kg	Maëlyn Michel	31 August 2026	Mediterranean Games	San Giorgio Ionico, Italy	
Clean & Jerk	118 kg	Maëlyn Michel	1 November 2026	World Championships	Ningbo, China	
Total	195 kg	Maëlyn Michel	31 August 2026	Mediterranean Games	San Giorgio Ionico, Italy	
Total	220 kg	Maëlyn Michel	1 November 2026	World Championships	Ningbo, China	
69 kg
Snatch	96 kg	Laurène Fauvel	28 March 2026		Bordeaux, France	
Clean & Jerk	121 kg	Laurène Fauvel	22 April 2026	European Championships	Batumi, Georgia	
Total	216 kg	Laurène Fauvel	22 April 2026	European Championships	Batumi, Georgia	
77 kg
Snatch	95 kg	Morgane Assah	14 June 2026	French Championships	Durstel, France	
Clean & Jerk	119 kg	Sara Iafrate	14 February 2026		Lyon, France	
Total	210 kg	Sara Iafrate	14 February 2026		Lyon, France	
86 kg
Snatch	105 kg	Marie Fegue	14 June 2026	French Championships	Durstel, France	
Snatch	107 kg	Marie Fegue	7 November 2026	World Championships	Ningbo, China	
Clean & Jerk	130 kg	Marie Fegue	14 June 2026	French Championships	Durstel, France	
Clean & Jerk	136 kg	Marie Fegue	7 November 2026	World Championships	Ningbo, China	
Total	235 kg	Marie Fegue	14 June 2026	French Championships	Durstel, France	
Total	243 kg	Marie Fegue	7 November 2026	World Championships	Ningbo, China	
+86 kg
Snatch	92 kg	Léa Cregut Dupont	28 March 2026		Châteauroux, France	
Clean & Jerk	112 kg	Standard				
Total	201 kg	Léa Cregut Dupont	28 March 2026		Châteauroux, France	

== Historical records ==
=== Men (2025–2026) ===
Event	Record	Athlete	Date	Meet	Place	Ref
71 kg
Snatch	138 kg	Bernardin Matam	5 October 2025	World Championships	Førde, Norway	
Clean & Jerk	173 kg	Bernardin Matam	5 October 2025	World Championships	Førde, Norway	
Total	311 kg	Bernardin Matam	5 October 2025	World Championships	Førde, Norway	
79 kg
Snatch	138 kg	Adam Iafrate	13 June 2026	French Championships	Durstel, France	
Clean & Jerk	164 kg	Valentin Christophel	13 June 2026	French Championships	Durstel, France	
Total	300 kg	Valentin Christophel	13 June 2026	French Championships	Durstel, France	
88 kg
Snatch	139 kg	Youenn Personnic	13 June 2026	French Championships	Durstel, France	
Clean & Jerk	175 kg	Yannis Derric	8 August 2026	CAC Games	Santo Domingo, Dominican Republic	
Total	312 kg	Youenn Personnic	13 June 2026	French Championships	Durstel, France	
94 kg
Snatch	163 kg	Romain Imadouchène	24 April 2026	European Championships	Batumi, Georgia	
Clean & Jerk	211 kg	Romain Imadouchène	9 October 2025	World Championships	Førde, Norway	
Total	371 kg	Romain Imadouchène	9 October 2025	World Championships	Førde, Norway	

=== Men (2018–2025) ===
Event	Record	Athlete	Date	Meet	Place	Ref
55 kg
Snatch	92 kg	Lucas Delamotte	5 April 2025		Le Trait, France	
Clean & Jerk	113 kg	Yannis Bacherot	15 June 2024	French Championships	Dunkirk, France	
Total	201 kg	Yannis Bacherot	15 June 2024	French Championships	Dunkirk, France	
61 kg
Snatch	109 kg	Kévin Caesemaeker	22 October 2021	French Championships	Istres, France	
Clean & Jerk	125 kg	Kévin Caesemaeker	22 October 2021	French Championships	Istres, France	
Total	234 kg	Kévin Caesemaeker	22 October 2021	French Championships	Istres, France	
67 kg
Snatch	138 kg	Bernardin Matam	20 December 2018	Qatar Cup	Doha, Qatar	
Clean & Jerk	175 kg	Bernardin Matam	8 April 2019	European Championships	Batumi, Georgia	
Total	313 kg	Bernardin Matam	20 September 2019	World Championships	Pattaya, Thailand	
73 kg
Snatch	145 kg	Bernardin Matam	8 August 2024	Olympic Games	Paris, France	
Clean & Jerk	182 kg	Bernardin Matam	15 February 2024	European Championships	Sofia, Bulgaria	
Total	324 kg	Bernardin Matam	15 February 2024	European Championships	Sofia, Bulgaria	
81 kg
Snatch	142 kg	Norik Ghazaryan	5 February 2022		Monteux, France	
Clean & Jerk	180 kg	Norik Ghazaryan	5 February 2022		Monteux, France	
Total	322 kg	Norik Ghazaryan	5 February 2022		Monteux, France	
89 kg
Snatch	160 kg	Romain Imadouchène	11 September 2023	World Championships	Riyadh, Saudi Arabia	
Clean & Jerk	209 kg	Romain Imadouchène	11 September 2023	World Championships	Riyadh, Saudi Arabia	
Total	369 kg	Romain Imadouchène	11 September 2023	World Championships	Riyadh, Saudi Arabia	
96 kg
Snatch	165 kg	Romain Imadouchène	12 December 2022	World Championships	Bogotá, Colombia	
Clean & Jerk	213 kg	Romain Imadouchène	12 December 2022	World Championships	Bogotá, Colombia	
Total	378 kg	Romain Imadouchène	12 December 2022	World Championships	Bogotá, Colombia	
102 kg
Snatch	167 kg	Redon Manushi	12 June 2022		Figeac, France	
Clean & Jerk	210 kg	Brandon Vautard	18 February 2024	European Championships	Sofia, Bulgaria	
Total	370 kg	Romain Imadouchène	5 February 2022		Monteux, France	
109 kg
Snatch	160 kg	Benjamin Ferré	20 April 2025	European Championships	Chișinău, Moldova	
Clean & Jerk	207 kg	Brandon Vautard	3 February 2024		Luxeuil-les-Bains, France	
Total	360 kg	Brandon Vautard	3 February 2024		Luxeuil-les-Bains, France	
+109 kg
Snatch	168 kg	Anthony Coullet	4 February 2023		Saint-Médard-en-Jalles, France	
Clean & Jerk	222 kg	Anthony Coullet	4 February 2023		Saint-Médard-en-Jalles, France	
Total	390 kg	Anthony Coullet	4 February 2023		Saint-Médard-en-Jalles, France	

=== Men (1998–2018) ===
Event	Record	Athlete	Date	Meet	Place	Ref
56 kg
Snatch	120 kg	Eric Bonnel	10 June 2000		Caen, France	
Clean & Jerk	150 kg	Eric Bonnel	10 June 2000		Caen, France	
Total	270 kg	Eric Bonnel	10 June 2000		Caen, France	
62 kg
Snatch	130 kg	Samson Ndicka	17 April 2003	European Championships	Loutraki, Greece	
Clean & Jerk	165 kg	Samson Ndicka	26 April 2000	European Championships	Sofia, Bulgaria	
Total	292,5 kg	Samson Ndicka	26 April 2000	European Championships	Sofia, Bulgaria	
69 kg
Snatch	151 kg	Vencelas Dabaya	10 August 2008	Olympic Games	Beijing, China	
Clean & Jerk	188 kg	Vencelas Dabaya	17 April 2008	European Championships	Lignano Sabbiadoro, Italy	
Total	338 kg	Vencelas Dabaya	10 August 2008	Olympic Games	Beijing, China	
77 kg
Snatch	156 kg	Giovanni Bardis	11 August 2008	Olympic Games	Beijing, China	
Clean & Jerk	191 kg	Vencelas Dabaya	24 May 2008	National Championships	Clermont-l'Hérault, France	
Total	341 kg	Vencelas Dabaya	24 May 2008	National Championships	Clermont-l'Hérault, France	
85 kg
Snatch	170 kg	Benjamin Hennequin	11 November 2011	World Championships	Paris, France	
Clean & Jerk	208 kg	Benjamin Hennequin	15 April 2011	European Championships	Kazan, Russia	
Total	378 kg	Benjamin Hennequin	11 November 2011	World Championships	Paris, France	
94 kg
Snatch	172 kg	Redon Manushi	7 April 2017	European Championships	Split, Croatia	
Clean & Jerk	215 kg	Benjamin Hennequin	3 March 2012	National Championships	Quimper, France	
Total	382 kg	Benjamin Hennequin	3 March 2012	National Championships	Quimper, France	
105 kg
Snatch	175 kg	Redon Manushi	7 October 2017	National Team Championships	Strasbourg, France	
Clean & Jerk	203 kg	Vincent Mugnier	23 June 2007		Blois, France	
Total	366 kg	David Matam	24 March 2013	National Championships	Saint-Médard-en-Jalles, France	
+105 kg
Snatch	175 kg	Apolosio Tokotuu	24 June 2001		Dijon, France	
Clean & Jerk	212,5 kg	Apolosio Tokotuu	24 June 2001		Dijon, France	
Total	387,5 kg	Apolosio Tokotuu	24 June 2001		Dijon, France	

=== Women (2025–2026) ===
Event	Record	Athlete	Date	Meet	Place	Ref
48 kg
Snatch	69 kg	Mara Strzykala	13 June 2026	French Championships	Durstel, France	
Clean & Jerk	90 kg	Mara Strzykala	14 February 2026		Lyon, France	
Total	157 kg	Mara Strzykala	14 February 2026		Lyon, France	
58 kg
Snatch	95 kg	Garance Rigaud	17 February 2026		Franconville, France	
Clean & Jerk	118 kg	Garance Rigaud	4 October 2025	World Championships	Førde, Norway	
Total	211 kg	Garance Rigaud	4 October 2025	World Championships	Førde, Norway	
63 kg
Snatch	102 kg	Maëlyn Michel	14 June 2026	French Championships	Durstel, France	
Clean & Jerk	120 kg	Maëlyn Michel	14 February 2026		Lyon, France	
Total	220 kg	Maëlyn Michel	14 February 2026		Lyon, France	

=== Women (2018–2025) ===
Event	Record	Athlete	Date	Meet	Place	Ref
45 kg
Snatch	62 kg	Déborah Virama	25 February 2023		Saint-Paul, France	
Clean & Jerk	74 kg	Déborah Virama	27 May 2023		Vaulx-en-Velin, France	
Total	135 kg	Déborah Virama	25 February 2023		Saint-Paul, France	
49 kg
Snatch	80 kg	Manon Lorentz	4 October 2019	Mediterranean Cup	Serravalle, San Marino	
Clean & Jerk	102 kg	Anaïs Michel	4 October 2019	Mediterranean Cup	Serravalle, San Marino	
Total	181 kg	Anaïs Michel	4 October 2019	Mediterranean Cup	Serravalle, San Marino	
55 kg
Snatch	92 kg	Garance Rigaud	14 April 2025	European Championships	Chișinău, Moldova	
Clean & Jerk	113 kg	Garance Rigaud	14 April 2025	European Championships	Chișinău, Moldova	
Total	205 kg	Garance Rigaud	14 April 2025	European Championships	Chișinău, Moldova	
59 kg
Snatch	101 kg	Dora Tchakounté	3 April 2024	World Cup	Phuket, Thailand	
Clean & Jerk	123 kg	Dora Tchakounté	3 April 2024	World Cup	Phuket, Thailand	
Total	224 kg	Dora Tchakounté	3 April 2024	World Cup	Phuket, Thailand	
64 kg
Snatch	99 kg	Dora Tchakounté	22 October 2022		Clermont-l'Hérault, France	
Clean & Jerk	120 kg	Dora Tchakounté	22 October 2022		Clermont-l'Hérault, France	
Total	219 kg	Dora Tchakounté	22 October 2022		Clermont-l'Hérault, France	
71 kg
Snatch	110 kg	Marie Fegue	12 December 2022	World Championships	Bogotá, Colombia	
Clean & Jerk	133 kg	Marie Fegue	9 August 2024	Olympic Games	Paris, France	
Total	243 kg	Marie Fegue	9 August 2024	Olympic Games	Paris, France	
76 kg
Snatch	116 kg	Marie Fegue	15 June 2024	French Championships	Dunkirk, France	
Clean & Jerk	140 kg	Marie Fegue	20 April 2023	European Championships	Yerevan, Armenia	
Total	253 kg	Marie Fegue	20 April 2023	European Championships	Yerevan, Armenia	
81 kg
Snatch	102 kg	Gaëlle Nayo-Ketchanke	29 February 2020	Malta International Open	Cospicua, Malta	
Clean & Jerk	132 kg	Gaëlle Nayo-Ketchanke	29 February 2020	Malta International Open	Cospicua, Malta	
Total	234 kg	Gaëlle Nayo-Ketchanke	29 February 2020	Malta International Open	Cospicua, Malta	
87 kg
Snatch	108 kg	Gaëlle Nayo-Ketchanke	2 August 2021	Olympic Games	Tokyo, Japan	
Clean & Jerk	139 kg	Gaëlle Nayo-Ketchanke	2 August 2021	Olympic Games	Tokyo, Japan	
Total	247 kg	Gaëlle Nayo-Ketchanke	2 August 2021	Olympic Games	Tokyo, Japan	
+87 kg
Snatch	80 kg	Standard				
Clean & Jerk	100 kg	Standard				
Total	180 kg	Standard				

=== Women (1998–2018) ===
Event	Record	Athlete	Date	Meet	Place	Ref
-48 kg
Snatch	80 kg	Mélanie Noël	8 August 2008	Olympic Games	Beijing, China	
Clean & Jerk	100 kg	Mélanie Noël	14 April 2008	European Championships	Lignano Sabbiadoro, Italy	
Total	180 kg	Anaïs Michel	2 April 2017	European Championships	Split, Croatia	
-53 kg
Snatch	84 kg	Manon Lorentz	6 April 2014	European Championships	Tel Aviv, Israel	
Clean & Jerk	103 kg	Mélanie Noël	17 March 2007		Saint-Marcellin, France	
Total	184 kg	Manon Lorentz	6 April 2014	European Championships	Tel Aviv, Israel	
-58 kg
Snatch	91 kg	Dora Tchakounté	26 November 2016	France Championship of Clubs	Blanc-Mesnil, France	
Clean & Jerk	112 kg	Souad Dinar	11 November 2005	World Championships	Doha, Qatar	
Total	201 kg	Dora Tchakounté	26 November 2016	France Championship of Clubs	Blanc-Mesnil, France	
-63 kg
Snatch	93 kg	Muslimé Sunar	8 April 2010	European Championships	Minsk, Belarus	
Clean & Jerk	116 kg	Souad Dinar	15 October 2005		Clermont-l'Hérault, France	
Total	205 kg	Souad Dinar	15 October 2005		Clermont-l'Hérault, France	
-69 kg
Snatch	101 kg	Madeleine Yamechi	24 September 2007	World Championships	Chiang Mai, Thailand	
Clean & Jerk	126 kg	Madeleine Yamechi	19 April 2007	European Championships	Strasbourg, France	
Total	223 kg	Madeleine Yamechi	19 April 2007	European Championships	Strasbourg, France	
-75 kg
Snatch	111 kg	Gaëlle Nayo-Ketchanke	17 April 2015	European Championships	Tbilisi, Georgia	
Clean & Jerk	137 kg	Gaëlle Nayo-Ketchanke	17 April 2015	European Championships	Tbilisi, Georgia	
Total	248 kg	Gaëlle Nayo-Ketchanke	17 April 2015	European Championships	Tbilisi, Georgia	
90 kg
Snatch	108 kg	Gaëlle Nayo-Ketchanke	24 October 2015	13th Denis Randon Memorial	Clermont-l'Hérault, France	
Clean & Jerk	136 kg	Gaëlle Nayo-Ketchanke	24 October 2015	13th Denis Randon Memorial	Clermont-l'Hérault, France	
Total	244 kg	Gaëlle Nayo-Ketchanke	24 October 2015	13th Denis Randon Memorial	Clermont-l'Hérault, France	
+90 kg
Snatch	107,5 kg	Sylvie Iskin	29 April 2000	European Championships	Sofia, Bulgaria	
Clean & Jerk	125 kg	Sylvie Iskin	29 April 2000	European Championships	Sofia, Bulgaria	
Total	232,5 kg	Sylvie Iskin	29 April 2000	European Championships	Sofia, Bulgaria	
