= List of Mongolian records in Olympic weightlifting =

The following are the records of Mongolia in Olympic weightlifting. Records are maintained in each weight class for the snatch lift, clean and jerk lift, and the total for both lifts by the Mongolian Weightlifting Federation.

== Current records ==
=== Men ===
Event	Record	Athlete	Date	Meet	Place	Ref
60 kg
Snatch	96 kg	Gan-Erdeniin Uuganbaatar	24 September 2026	Asian Games	Nagoya, Japan	
Clean & Jerk	105 kg	Gan-Erdeniin Uuganbaatar	24 September 2026	Asian Games	Nagoya, Japan	
Total	201 kg	Gan-Erdeniin Uuganbaatar	24 September 2026	Asian Games	Nagoya, Japan	
65 kg
Snatch	108 kg	Ösökhbayaryn Chagnaadorj	24 September 2026	Asian Games	Nagoya, Japan	
Clean & Jerk	130 kg	Ösökhbayaryn Chagnaadorj	24 September 2026	Asian Games	Nagoya, Japan	
Total	238 kg	Ösökhbayaryn Chagnaadorj	24 September 2026	Asian Games	Nagoya, Japan	
70 kg
Snatch	115 kg	Sumiyaagiin Gantsooj	26 September 2026	Asian Games	Nagoya, Japan	
Clean & Jerk	135 kg	Sumiyaagiin Gantsooj	26 September 2026	Asian Games	Nagoya, Japan	
Total	250 kg	Sumiyaagiin Gantsooj	26 September 2026	Asian Games	Nagoya, Japan	
75 kg
Snatch	120 kg	Ichinkhorloogiin Amarsanaa	26 September 2026	Asian Games	Nagoya, Japan	
Clean & Jerk	131 kg	Ichinkhorloogiin Amarsanaa	26 September 2026	Asian Games	Nagoya, Japan	
Total	251 kg	Ichinkhorloogiin Amarsanaa	26 September 2026	Asian Games	Nagoya, Japan	
85 kg
Snatch						
Clean & Jerk						
Total						
95 kg
Snatch	124 kg	Uuganbaataryn Mönkhbayar	28 September 2026	Asian Games	Nagoya, Japan	
Clean & Jerk	164 kg	Uuganbaataryn Mönkhbayar	28 September 2026	Asian Games	Nagoya, Japan	
Total	288 kg	Uuganbaataryn Mönkhbayar	28 September 2026	Asian Games	Nagoya, Japan	

=== Women ===
Event	Record	Athlete	Date	Meet	Place	Ref
49 kg
Snatch						
Clean & Jerk						
Total						
53 kg
Snatch						
Clean & Jerk						
Total						
57 kg
Snatch						
Clean & Jerk						
Total						
61 kg
Snatch						
Clean & Jerk						
Total						
69 kg
Snatch						
Clean & Jerk						
Total						
77 kg
Snatch						
Clean & Jerk						
Total						
86 kg
Snatch						
Clean & Jerk						
Total						
+86 kg
Snatch						
Clean & Jerk						
Total						

== Historical records ==
=== Men (2018-2025) ===
Event	Record	Athlete	Date	Meet	Place	Ref
55 kg
Snatch	103 kg	Ösökhbayaryn Chagnaadorj	5 September 2023	World Championships	Riyadh, Saudi Arabia	
Clean & Jerk	133 kg	Ösökhbayaryn Chagnaadorj	5 September 2023	World Championships	Riyadh, Saudi Arabia	
Total	236 kg	Ösökhbayaryn Chagnaadorj	5 September 2023	World Championships	Riyadh, Saudi Arabia	
61 kg
Snatch	110 kg	Ulaantsetsegiin Amarbayar	4 September 2023	World Championships	Riyadh, Saudi Arabia	
Clean & Jerk	130 kg	Ulaantsetsegiin Amarbayar	4 September 2023	World Championships	Riyadh, Saudi Arabia	
Total	240 kg	Ulaantsetsegiin Amarbayar	4 September 2023	World Championships	Riyadh, Saudi Arabia	
67 kg
Snatch	124 kg	Munkdhul Enkhjargal	10 December 2019	World Cup	Tianjin, China	
Clean & Jerk	148 kg	Munkdhul Enkhjargal	21 April 2019	Asian Championships	Ningbo, China	
Total	271 kg	Munkdhul Enkhjargal	21 April 2019	Asian Championships	Ningbo, China	
73 kg
Snatch	122 kg	Munkdhul Enkhjargal	21 December 2019	Qatar Cup	Doha, Qatar	
Clean & Jerk	149 kg	Munkdhul Enkhjargal	21 December 2019	Qatar Cup	Doha, Qatar	
Total	271 kg	Munkdhul Enkhjargal	21 December 2019	Qatar Cup	Doha, Qatar	
81 kg
Snatch	105 kg	Otgonbayaryn Buyantogtokh	9 May 2023	Asian Championships	Jinju, South Korea	
Clean & Jerk	130 kg	Otgonbayaryn Buyantogtokh	9 May 2023	Asian Championships	Jinju, South Korea	
Total	235 kg	Otgonbayaryn Buyantogtokh	9 May 2023	Asian Championships	Jinju, South Korea	
89 kg
Snatch	122 kg	Dorjsembiin Dorjnamjim	10 May 2023	Asian Championships	Jinju, South Korea	
Clean & Jerk	158 kg	Dorjsembiin Dorjnamjim	10 May 2023	Asian Championships	Jinju, South Korea	
Total	280 kg	Dorjsembiin Dorjnamjim	10 May 2023	Asian Championships	Jinju, South Korea	
96 kg
Snatch	123 kg	Tsend-Ayush Byambajargal	23 April 2021	Asian Championships	Tashkent, Uzbekistan	
Clean & Jerk	150 kg	Tsend-Ayush Byambajargal	23 April 2021	Asian Championships	Tashkent, Uzbekistan	
Total	273 kg	Tsend-Ayush Byambajargal	23 April 2021	Asian Championships	Tashkent, Uzbekistan	
102 kg
Snatch						
Clean & Jerk						
Total						
109 kg
Snatch						
Clean & Jerk						
Total						
+109 kg
Snatch	108 kg	Muratbyekiin Bakhbyergyen	17 September 2023	World Championships	Riyadh, Saudi Arabia	
Clean & Jerk	138 kg	Muratbyekiin Bakhbyergyen	17 September 2023	World Championships	Riyadh, Saudi Arabia	
Total	246 kg	Muratbyekiin Bakhbyergyen	17 September 2023	World Championships	Riyadh, Saudi Arabia	

=== Women (2018-2025) ===
Event	Record	Athlete	Date	Meet	Place	Ref
45 kg
Snatch	60 kg	Batnasangiin Tungalag	3 February 2024	Asian Championships	Tashkent, Uzbekistan	
Clean and Jerk	75 kg	Batnasangiin Tungalag	4 September 2023	World Championships	Riyadh, Saudi Arabia	
Total	130 kg	Batnasangiin Tungalag	3 February 2024	Asian Championships	Tashkent, Uzbekistan	
49 kg
Snatch	71 kg	Buyandelgeriin Erdenezul	5 May 2023	Asian Championships	Jinju, South Korea	
Clean and Jerk	92 kg	Buyandelgeriin Erdenezul	5 May 2023	Asian Championships	Jinju, South Korea	
Total	163 kg	Buyandelgeriin Erdenezul	5 May 2023	Asian Championships	Jinju, South Korea	
55 kg
Snatch	70 kg	Buyandelgeriin Erdenezul	30 September 2023	Asian Games	Hangzhou, China	
Clean and Jerk	87 kg	Buyandelgeriin Erdenezul	30 September 2023	Asian Games	Hangzhou, China	
Total	157 kg	Buyandelgeriin Erdenezul	30 September 2023	Asian Games	Hangzhou, China	
59 kg
Snatch	96 kg	Enkhbaataryn Enkhtamir	7 May 2023	Asian Championships	Jinju, South Korea	
Clean & Jerk	110 kg	Enkhbaataryn Enkhtamir	7 May 2023	Asian Championships	Jinju, South Korea	
Total	206 kg	Enkhbaataryn Enkhtamir	7 May 2023	Asian Championships	Jinju, South Korea	
64 kg
Snatch	96 kg	Ganzorig Anuujin	24 April 2019	Asian Championships	Ningbo, China	
Clean and Jerk	118 kg	Ganzorig Anuujin	8 May 2023	Asian Championships	Jinju, South Korea	
Total	211 kg	Ganzorig Anuujin	8 May 2023	Asian Championships	Jinju, South Korea	
71 kg
Snatch	99 kg	Ganzorigiin Anuujin	12 October 2022	Asian Championships	Manama, Bahrain	
Clean and Jerk	122 kg	Gombosürengiin Enerel	9 May 2023	Asian Championships	Jinju, South Korea	
Total	215 kg	Ganzorigiin Anuujin	12 October 2022	Asian Championships	Manama, Bahrain	
76 kg
Snatch	102 kg	Ankhtsetseg Munkhjantsan	22 December 2019	Qatar Cup	Doha, Qatar	
Clean and Jerk	124 kg	Ankhtsetseg Munkhjantsan	22 December 2019	Qatar Cup	Doha, Qatar	
Total	226 kg	Ankhtsetseg Munkhjantsan	22 December 2019	Qatar Cup	Doha, Qatar	
81 kg
Snatch	108 kg	Mönkhjantsangiin Ankhtsetseg	11 May 2023	Asian Championships	Jinju, South Korea	
Clean and Jerk	135 kg	Mönkhjantsangiin Ankhtsetseg	11 May 2023	Asian Championships	Jinju, South Korea	
Total	243 kg	Mönkhjantsangiin Ankhtsetseg	11 May 2023	Asian Championships	Jinju, South Korea	
87 kg
Snatch	114 kg	Mönkhjantsangiin Ankhtsetseg	15 October 2022	Asian Championships	Manama, Bahrain	
Clean and Jerk	142 kg	Mönkhjantsangiin Ankhtsetseg	2 August 2021	Olympic Games	Tokyo, Japan	
Total	252 kg	Mönkhjantsangiin Ankhtsetseg	2 August 2021	Olympic Games	Tokyo, Japan	
+87 kg
Snatch	85 kg	Erdenebatyn Bilegsaikhan	2 August 2021	Olympic Games	Tokyo, Japan	
Clean and Jerk	122 kg	Erdenebatyn Bilegsaikhan	2 August 2021	Olympic Games	Tokyo, Japan	
Total	207 kg	Erdenebatyn Bilegsaikhan	2 August 2021	Olympic Games	Tokyo, Japan	

== Historical records ==
=== Women (1998–2018) ===
Event	Record	Athlete	Date	Meet	Place	Ref
48 kg
Snatch	62 kg	Nyamzul Chuluunbaatar	24 April 2016	Asian Championships	Tashkent, Uzbekistan	
Clean and jerk	70 kg	Oyuntungalag Bayarsetseg	23–25 March 2012	XIII Mongolia Spartakiad	Erdenet, Mongolia	
Total	132 kg	Nyamzul Chuluunbaatar	24 April 2016	Asian Championships	Tashkent, Uzbekistan	
53 kg
Snatch						
Clean and jerk						
Total						
58 kg
Snatch						
Clean and jerk						
Total						
63 kg
Snatch	97 kg	Namkhaidorj Bayarmaa	23–25 March 2012	XIII Mongolia Spartakiad	Erdenet, Mongolia	
Clean and jerk	126 kg	Namkhaidorj Bayarmaa	23–25 March 2012	XIII Mongolia Spartakiad	Erdenet, Mongolia	
Total	223 kg	Namkhaidorj Bayarmaa	23–25 March 2012	XIII Mongolia Spartakiad	Erdenet, Mongolia	
69 kg
Snatch	106 kg	Mönkhjantsangiin Ankhtsetseg	10 August 2016	Olympic Games	Rio de Janeiro, Brazil	
Clean and jerk	131 kg	Mönkhjantsangiin Ankhtsetseg	10 August 2016	Olympic Games	Rio de Janeiro, Brazil	
Total	237 kg	Mönkhjantsangiin Ankhtsetseg	10 August 2016	Olympic Games	Rio de Janeiro, Brazil	
75 kg
Snatch	112 kg	Mönkhjantsangiin Ankhtsetseg	29 April 2016	Asian Championships	Tashkent, Uzbekistan	
Clean and jerk	132 kg	Mönkhjantsangiin Ankhtsetseg	29 April 2016	Asian Championships	Tashkent, Uzbekistan	
Total	244 kg	Mönkhjantsangiin Ankhtsetseg	29 April 2016	Asian Championships	Tashkent, Uzbekistan	
90 kg
Snatch	80 kg	Bilegsaikhan Erdenebat	4 December 2017	World Championships	Anaheim, United States	
Clean and jerk	105 kg	Bilegsaikhan Erdenebat	4 December 2017	World Championships	Anaheim, United States	
Total	185 kg	Bilegsaikhan Erdenebat	4 December 2017	World Championships	Anaheim, United States	
+90 kg
Snatch						
Clean and jerk						
Total						
