= Weightlifting at the 2026 Asian Games =

- Venue: Nagoya Trade & Industry Center
- Dates: 23–29 September 2026
- Competitors: 149 from 31 nations

Weightlifting at the 2026 Asian Games was held between 23 and 29 September at Nagoya Trade & Industry Center, Nagoya, Japan. Each country was limited to having 5 men and 5 women.

== Schedule ==
B	Group B	A	Group A

Event↓/Date →	23rd Wed		24th Thu		25th Fri		26th Sat	27th Sun	28th Mon		29th Tue
Men's 60 kg			B	A							
Men's 65 kg			B	A							
Men's 70 kg							A				
Men's 75 kg							A				
Men's 85 kg									B	A	
Men's 95 kg									B	A	
Men's 110 kg								B			A
Men's +110 kg											A
Women's 49 kg	B	A									
Women's 53 kg	B	A									
Women's 57 kg					A						
Women's 61 kg					B	A					
Women's 69 kg								A			
Women's 77 kg								A			
Women's 86 kg											A
Women's +86 kg											A

== Medalists ==
=== Men ===
Event	Gold	Silver	Bronze
60 kg	Yang Yang; China	Pang Un-chol; North Korea	Theerapong Silachai; Thailand
65 kg	Pak Myong-jin; North Korea	He Yueji; China	Trần Minh Trí; Vietnam
70 kg	Ri Won-ju; North Korea	Masanori Miyamoto; Japan	Albert Delos Santos; Philippines
75 kg	Rahmat Erwin Abdullah; Indonesia	Weeraphon Wichuma; Thailand	Ri Chong-song; North Korea
85 kg	Ro Kwang-ryol; North Korea	Alexey Churkin; Kazakhstan	Chen Shunnan; China
95 kg	Ali Alipour; Iran	Nurgissa Adiletuly; Kazakhstan	Tu Yi; China
110 kg	Akbar Djuraev; Uzbekistan	Şahzadbek Matýakubow; Turkmenistan	Liu Huanhua; China
+110 kg	Ali Davoudi; Iran	Ali Ammar; Iraq	Gor Minasyan; Bahrain

=== Women ===
Event	Gold	Silver	Bronze
49 kg	Ri Song-gum; North Korea	Mirabai Chanu; India	Luluk Diana Tri Wijayana; Indonesia
53 kg	Kang Hyon-gyong; North Korea	Zhao Jinlan; China	Surodchana Khambao; Thailand
57 kg	Oh Kwang-ok; North Korea	Suratwadee Yodsarn; Thailand	Chen Guan-ling; Chinese Taipei
61 kg	Yang Liuyue; China	Pak Jin-hae; North Korea	Kuo Hsing-chun; Chinese Taipei
69 kg	Song Kuk-hyang; North Korea	Chen Wen-huei; Chinese Taipei	Ingrid Segura; Bahrain
77 kg	He Renxiu; China	Ayanat Zhumagali; Kazakhstan	Reihaneh Karimi; Iran
86 kg	Wu Yan; China	Alina Marushchak; Bahrain	Mahsa Beheshti; Iran
+86 kg	Li Wenwen; China	Park Hye-jeong; South Korea	Ouisal Ikhlef; Qatar

== Medal table ==
Rank	Nation	Gold	Silver	Bronze	Total
1	North Korea (PRK)	7	2	1	10
2	China (CHN)	5	2	3	10
3	Iran (IRI)	2	0	2	4
4	Indonesia (INA)	1	0	1	2
5	Uzbekistan (UZB)	1	0	0	1
6	Kazakhstan (KAZ)	0	3	0	3
7	Thailand (THA)	0	2	2	4
8	Bahrain (BRN)	0	1	2	3
8	Chinese Taipei (TPE)	0	1	2	3
10	India (IND)	0	1	0	1
10	Iraq (IRQ)	0	1	0	1
10	Japan (JPN)	0	1	0	1
10	South Korea (KOR)	0	1	0	1
10	Turkmenistan (TKM)	0	1	0	1
15	Philippines (PHI)	0	0	1	1
15	Qatar (QAT)	0	0	1	1
15	Vietnam (VIE)	0	0	1	1
Totals (17 entries)		16	16	16	48

== Participating nations ==
A total of 149 athletes from 31 nations are competing in weightlifting at the 2026 Asian Games:

- Bahrain (4)
- Bangladesh (4)
- China (10)
- Chinese Taipei (10)
- Hong Kong (2)
- India (4)
- Indonesia (7)
- Iran (6)
- Iraq (1)
- Japan (10)
- Jordan (1)
- Kazakhstan (10)
- Kyrgyzstan (1)
- Lebanon (1)
- Malaysia (2)
- Mongolia (10)
- North Korea (10)
- Oman (2)
- Palestine (1)
- Philippines (5)
- Qatar (2)
- Saudi Arabia (3)
- South Korea (10)
- Sri Lanka (3)
- Tajikistan (1)
- Thailand (10)
- Timor-Leste (2)
- Turkmenistan (4)
- United Arab Emirates (3)
- Uzbekistan (6)
- Vietnam (4)
