= Weightlifting at the 2022 Asian Games – Men's 73 kg =

Men's 73 kg at the 2022 Asian Games
- Venue: Xiaoshan Sports Center Gymnasium
- Date: 3 October 2023
- Competitors: 14 from 12 nations

Medalists
gold medal	Rahmat Erwin Abdullah	Indonesia
silver medal	Weeraphon Wichuma	Thailand
bronze medal	Oh Kum-thaek	North Korea

The men's 73 kilograms competition at the 2022 Asian Games took place on 3 October 2023 at Xiaoshan Sports Center Gymnasium.

== Schedule ==
All times are China Standard Time (UTC+08:00)

Date	Time	Event
Tuesday, 3 October 2023	15:00	Group B
Tuesday, 3 October 2023	19:00	Group A

== Records ==
Prior to this competition, the existing world, Asian and Games records were as follows.

World Record	Snatch	Shi Zhiyong (CHN)	169 kg	Tashkent, Uzbekistan	20 April 2021
World Record	Clean & Jerk	Rahmat Erwin Abdullah (INA)	200 kg	Bogotá, Colombia	9 December 2022
World Record	Total	Shi Zhiyong (CHN)	364 kg	Tokyo, Japan	28 July 2021
Asian Record	Snatch	Shi Zhiyong (CHN)	169 kg	Tashkent, Uzbekistan	20 April 2021
Asian Record	Clean & Jerk	Rahmat Erwin Abdullah (INA)	200 kg	Bogotá, Colombia	9 December 2022
Asian Record	Total	Shi Zhiyong (CHN)	364 kg	Tokyo, Japan	28 July 2021
Games Record	Snatch	Asian Games Standard	156 kg	—	1 November 2018
Games Record	Clean & Jerk	Asian Games Standard	189 kg	—	1 November 2018
Games Record	Total	Asian Games Standard	339 kg	—	1 November 2018

== Results ==
Legend

- NM — No mark

Rank	Athlete	Group	Snatch (kg)				Clean & Jerk (kg)				Total
Rank	Athlete	Group	1	2	3	Result	1	2	3	Result	Total
1st place, gold medalist(s)	Rahmat Erwin Abdullah (INA)	A	152	156	158	158	192	196	201	201	359
2nd place, silver medalist(s)	Weeraphon Wichuma (THA)	A	151	154	156	156	190	~~195~~	195	195	351
3rd place, bronze medalist(s)	Oh Kum-thaek (PRK)	A	146	151	~~154~~	151	187	~~193~~	193	193	344
4	Pak Jong-ju (PRK)	A	147	151	~~153~~	151	188	~~194~~	~~194~~	188	339
5	Masanori Miyamoto (JPN)	A	140	145	~~150~~	145	175	180	185	185	330
6	Bak Joo-hyo (KOR)	A	142	~~147~~	147	147	180	~~193~~	~~193~~	180	327
7	Mahmoud Al-Humayd (KSA)	A	~~143~~	143	147	147	172	180	~~182~~	180	327
8	Mitsunori Konnai (JPN)	A	140	~~144~~	144	144	170	178	~~184~~	178	322
9	Bektimur Reýimow (TKM)	A	142	~~146~~	~~147~~	142	~~170~~	170	~~175~~	170	312
10	Alibek Rakhymberdi (KAZ)	B	128	132	~~135~~	132	163	173	~~176~~	173	305
11	Indika Dissanayake (SRI)	B	125	~~131~~	~~131~~	125	155	160	~~163~~	160	285
12	Sheikh Nayem Hossain (BAN)	B	115	~~118~~	~~118~~	115	~~140~~	140	~~144~~	140	255
—	Wei Yinting (CHN)	A	153	158	161	161	~~180~~	~~180~~	~~180~~	—	NM
—	Ariunboldyn Anand (MGL)	B	~~111~~	111	~~115~~	111	~~140~~	~~140~~	—	—	NM

== New records ==
The following records were established during the competition.

Snatch	158	Wei Yinting (CHN)	GR
Snatch	161	Wei Yinting (CHN)	GR
Clean & Jerk	190	Weeraphon Wichuma (THA)	GR
Clean & Jerk	192	Rahmat Erwin Abdullah (INA)	GR
Clean & Jerk	193	Oh Kum-thaek (PRK)	GR
Clean & Jerk	195	Weeraphon Wichuma (THA)	GR
Clean & Jerk	196	Rahmat Erwin Abdullah (INA)	GR
Clean & Jerk	201	Rahmat Erwin Abdullah (INA)	WR
Total	346	Weeraphon Wichuma (THA)	GR
Total	350	Rahmat Erwin Abdullah (INA)	GR
Total	351	Weeraphon Wichuma (THA)	GR
Total	354	Rahmat Erwin Abdullah (INA)	GR
Total	359	Rahmat Erwin Abdullah (INA)	GR
