= Bak Joo-hyo =

South Korean weightlifter (born 1997)

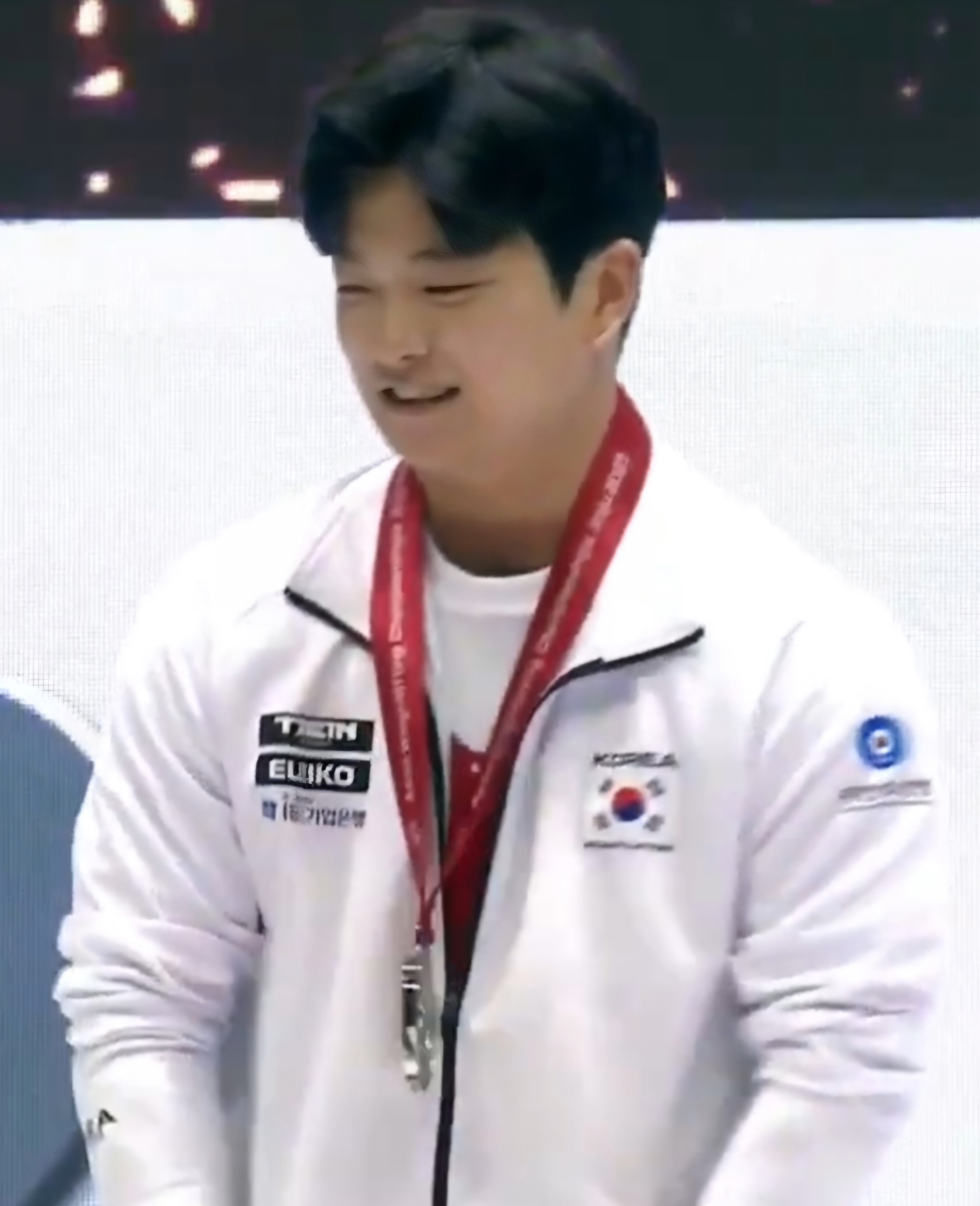
- Joo-hyo in 2023

Personal information
- Nationality: South Korean
- Born: 29 June 1997 (age 29) Goyang, Gyeonggi-do, South Korea
- Weight: 72.71 kg (160 lb)

Sport
- Country: South Korea
- Sport: Weightlifting
- Event: 73 kg

Achievements and titles
- Personal bests: Snatch: 151 kg (2019); Clean and jerk: 191 kg (2023); Total: 340 kg (2023)
Medal record
Men's weightlifting
Representing South Korea
| Event | 1st | 2nd | 3rd |
|---|---|---|---|
| Junior World Championships | 0 | 0 | 1 |
| Asian Junior Championships | 0 | 1 | 0 |
| Total | 0 | 1 | 1 |
Junior World Championships
| Bronze medal – third place | 2017 Tokyo | –69 kg |
Asian Junior Championships
| Silver medal – second place | 2017 Kathmandu | –69 kg |

- Korean name
- Hangul: 박주효
- Hanja: 朴主孝
- RR: Bak Juhyo
- MR: Pak Chuhyo

Bak Joo-hyo (Korean: 박주효; born 29 June 1997) is a South Korean weightlifter and amateur singer.

== Career ==
As a junior, Bak participated in competitions such as the 2016 and 2017 Asian Junior Weightlifting Championships, as well as the 2017 Junior World Weightlifting Championships where he placed fourth, second, and third respectively.

As a senior, he participated in the 2019 World Weightlifting Championships in the men's 73 kg category for his world championship debut. He placed seventh with a 337 kg total.

The following years he participated at the 2022 World Weightlifting Championships once again in the men's 73 kg category, where he finished with no total as he failed all lifts. He also participated in the 2023 Asian Weightlifting Championships, winning his first minor continental medal with a silver in the clean and jerk with a 191 kg lift. With a 340 kg total, he placed fourth.

In August 2024, Bak competed in the men's 73 kg event at the 2024 Summer Olympics held in Paris, France. He lifted 334 kg in total and placed seventh.

== Singing career ==
Bak started singing when he was younger. He considers singing as a career option after he retires from weightlifting. After weightlifting training, he usually goes to singing rooms to practice singing.

=== TV appearance ===
Bak participated in the second episode of the tenth season of the South Korean version of I Can See Your Voice, where he won the episode.

=== 2023 Asian Weightlifting Championships ===
During the 2023 Asian Weightlifting Championships, his TV appearance at I Can See Your Voice has been featured on the big screen at the Jinju Arena everyday. After competing in his session, he gave a performance in between sessions.

== Major results ==
| Year | Venue | Weight | Snatch (kg) | | | | Clean & Jerk (kg) | | | | Total | Rank |
| Year | Venue | Weight | 1 | 2 | 3 | Rank | 1 | 2 | 3 | Rank | Total | Rank |
Olympic Games
| 2024 | Paris, France | 73 kg | ~~146~~ | 147 | ~~150~~ | —N/a | ~~186~~ | 187 | ~~196~~ | —N/a | 334 | 7 |
World Championships
| 2019 | Pattaya, Thailand | 73 kg | 147 | 151 | ~~155~~ | 9 | ~~186~~ | 186 | ~~191~~ | 5 | 337 | 7 |
| 2022 | Bogotá, Colombia | 73 kg | ~~148~~ | ~~148~~ | ~~149~~ | — | ~~186~~ | ~~188~~ | ~~191~~ | — | — | — |
| 2023 | Riyadh, Saudi Arabia | 73 kg | ~~143~~ | 143 | ~~147~~ | 17 | 180 | 187 | ~~192~~ | 2nd place, silver medalist(s) | 330 | 9 |
IWF World Cup
| 2024 | Phuket, Thailand | 73 kg | ~~147~~ | 147 | 150 | 14 | 192 | 195 | ~~199~~ | 3rd place, bronze medalist(s) | 345 | 5 |
Asian Games
| 2023 | Hangzhou, China | 73 kg | 142 | ~~147~~ | 147 | 6 | 180 | ~~193~~ | ~~193~~ | 6 | 327 | 6 |
Asian Championships
| 2023 | Jinju, South Korea | 73 kg | 146 | 149 | ~~152~~ | 6 | 186 | ~~190~~ | 191 | 2nd place, silver medalist(s) | 340 | 4 |
| 2024 | Tashkent, Uzbekistan | 73 kg | 141 | ~~146~~ | ~~147~~ | 9 | 183 | 186 | ~~193~~ | 3rd place, bronze medalist(s) | 327 | 5 |
Junior World Championships
| 2017 | Tokyo, Japan | 69 kg | 132 | ~~137~~ | 138 | 5 | 167 | ~~172~~ | ~~172~~ | 5 | 305 | 3rd place, bronze medalist(s) |
Asian Junior Championships
| 2016 | Tokyo, Japan | 69 kg | 128 | ~~132~~ | ~~134~~ | 5 | 166 | 170 | 172 | 3rd place, bronze medalist(s) | 300 | 4 |
| 2017 | Kathmandu, Nepal | 69 kg | 133 | ~~137~~ | 137 | 2nd place, silver medalist(s) | 166 | ~~172~~ | 173 | 2nd place, silver medalist(s) | 310 | 2nd place, silver medalist(s) |
