= Samson Matam =

French weightlifter (born 1976)

Samson Ndicka-Matam (born 22 April 1976) is a retired male weightlifter from Cameroon, who later represented France. He competed in three consecutive Summer Olympics, starting in 1996 for Cameroon (Atlanta, Georgia). His best finish was the sixth place in the men's featherweight division (2004).

== Personal ==
Three of his brothers are also international weightlifters who competed at the Olympic Games. That are Alphonse Hercule Matam (1992), David Matam (2004) and Bernardin Matam (2012).
