= Pang Un-chol =

North Korean weightlifter (born 2001)

Personal information
- Born: January 19, 2001 (age 25) North Korea
- Weight: 60 kg (132 lb)

Sport
- Country: North Korea
- Sport: Weightlifting

Achievements and titles
- Personal bests: Snatch: 127 kg (2025); Clean & Jerk: 168 kg (2025); Total: 295 kg (2025)
Medal record
Men's weightlifting
Representing North Korea
World Championships
Silver medal – second place	2026 Ningbo	60 kg
Bronze medal – third place	2025 Førde	60 kg
Asian Games
Silver medal – second place	2026 Aichi–Nagoya	60 kg
Asian Championships
Gold medal – first place	2024 Tashkent	55 kg
Gold medal – first place	2026 Gandhinagar	60 kg
World Cup
Gold medal – first place	2024 Phuket	55 kg

Korean name
- Hangul: 방은철
- RR: Bang Euncheol
- MR: Pang Ŭnch'ŏl

Pang Un-chol (Korean: 방은철; born 19 January 2001) is a North Korean weightlifter competing in the men's 65 kg category. He won a bronze medal in the men's 60 kg event at the 2025 World Weightlifting Championships held in Førde, Norway. and a gold medal in the men's 55 kg event at the 2024 Asian Weightlifting Championships held in Tashkent, Uzbekistan.

== Achievements ==
Year	Venue	Weight	Snatch (kg)				Clean & Jerk (kg)				Total	Rank
Year	Venue	Weight	1	2	3	Rank	1	2	3	Rank	Total	Rank
World Championships
2024	Manama, Bahrain	55 kg	~~117~~	~~117~~	~~117~~	—N/a	150	~~154~~	154	1st place, gold medalist(s)	—N/a	—N/a
2025	Førde, Norway	60 kg	123	127	~~130~~	5	163	168	~~171~~	2nd place, silver medalist(s)	295	3rd place, bronze medalist(s)
2026	Ningbo, China	60 kg	126	130	~~132~~	2nd place, silver medalist(s)	~~170~~	~~170~~	170	2nd place, silver medalist(s)	300	2nd place, silver medalist(s)
Asian Games
2026	Nagoya, Japan	60 kg	~~127~~	127	~~131~~	—N/a	170	174	~~178~~	—N/a	301	2nd place, silver medalist(s)
Asian Championships
2024	Tashkent, Uzbekistan	55 kg	112	~~116~~	116	2nd place, silver medalist(s)	147	150	~~153~~	1st place, gold medalist(s)	266	1st place, gold medalist(s)
2026	Ghandinagar, India	60 kg	125	~~130~~	130	1st place, gold medalist(s)	165	~~174~~	174; WR	1st place, gold medalist(s)	304	1st place, gold medalist(s)
