= Wang Hao (weightlifter) =

Chinese weightlifter (born 1998)

Personal information
- Nationality: Chinese
- Born: August 16, 1998 (age 28) China
- Weight: 60 kg (130 lb)

Sport
- Country: China
- Sport: Weightlifting
- Event: -60 kg

Achievements and titles
- Personal bests: Snatch: 138 kg (2025); Clean & Jerk: 164 kg (2025); Total: 302 kg (2025)
Medal record
Representing China
Men's Weightlifting
World Championships
Gold medal – first place	2025 Førde	60 kg
Asian Championships
Silver medal – second place	2025 Jiangshan	61 kg
Junior World Championships
Gold medal – first place	2017 Tokyo	56 kg

Wang Hao (Chinese: 王皓; pinyin: Wáng Hào; born August 16, 1998) is a Chinese weightlifter. He won the gold medal in the men's 60 kg event at the 2025 World Weightlifting Championships held in Førde, Norway.

== Achievements ==
Year	Venue	Weight	Snatch (kg)				Clean & Jerk (kg)				Total	Rank
Year	Venue	Weight	1	2	3	Rank	1	2	3	Rank	Total	Rank
World Championships
2025	Førde, Norway	60 kg	133	138	—	1st place, gold medalist(s)	157	161	164	3rd place, bronze medalist(s)	302	1st place, gold medalist(s)
Junior World Championships
2017	Tokyo, Japan	56 kg	115	120	~~123~~	1st place, gold medalist(s)	133	138	~~141~~	3rd place, bronze medalist(s)	258	1st place, gold medalist(s)
