= 2026 World Weightlifting Championships – Men's 60 kg =

Men's 60 kg at the 2026 World Weightlifting Championships
- Venue: Ningbo Olympic Sports Center
- Location: Ningbo, China
- Dates: 27 October
- Competitors: 14 from 11 nations
- Winning total: 304 kg

Medalists
gold medal	Yang Yang	China
silver medal	Pang Un-chol	North Korea
bronze medal	Pak In-song	North Korea

The men's 60 kilograms competition at the 2026 World Weightlifting Championships was held on 27 October 2026.

== Schedule ==
Date	Time	Event
27 October 2026	13:30	Group B
27 October 2026	16:00	Group A

== Records ==
Prior to this competition, the existing world records were as follows.

World record	Snatch	World Standard	141 kg	—	1 June 2025
World record	Clean & Jerk	Pang Un-chol (PRK)	174 kg	Gandhinagar, India	11 May 2026
World record	Total	World Standard	307 kg	—	1 June 2025

== Results ==
Rank	Athlete	Group	Snatch (kg)				Clean & Jerk (kg)				Total
Rank	Athlete	Group	1	2	3	Rank	1	2	3	Rank	Total
1st place, gold medalist(s)	Yang Yang (CHN)	A	132	136	~~139~~	1st place, gold medalist(s)	162	168	~~171~~	3rd place, bronze medalist(s)	304
2nd place, silver medalist(s)	Pang Un-chol (PRK)	A	126	130	~~132~~	2nd place, silver medalist(s)	~~170~~	~~170~~	170	2nd place, silver medalist(s)	300
3rd place, bronze medalist(s)	Pak In-song (PRK)	A	125	129	~~131~~	3rd place, bronze medalist(s)	165	169	171	1st place, gold medalist(s)	300
4	K'Dương (VIE)	A	125	~~130~~	~~130~~	5	156	~~163~~	~~163~~	4	281
5	Yiğit Erdoğan (TUR)	A	118	122	124	7	~~146~~	148	153	6	277
6	Burak Aykun (TUR)	A	117	121	124	6	147	151	~~157~~	7	275
7	Aqeel Al-Jasim (KSA)	A	124	127	~~131~~	4	147	~~152~~	~~152~~	8	274
8	Hirai Kaito (JPN)	B	107	111	—	11	145	150	155	5	266
9	Giga Odikadze (GEO)	B	120	~~124~~	~~124~~	8	135	~~139~~	~~139~~	9	255
10	Havotriniaina Rakotomandimby (MAD)	B	~~105~~	~~105~~	105	12	130	~~135~~	~~135~~	10	235
11	Jomson Moyengwa (BOT)	B	~~75~~	~~75~~	75	13	85	90	~~95~~	11	165
—	Deniz Danev (BUL)	A	115	117	~~119~~	10	~~148~~	~~150~~	~~150~~	—	—
—	Angel Rusev (BUL)	A	~~115~~	~~115~~	~~115~~	—	—	—	—	—	—
—	Gabriel Chhum (USA)	B	120	~~125~~	~~125~~	9	—	—	—	—	—
—	Otto Oñate (CUB)	B	Did not start								
—	Dilanka Isuru Kumara (SRI)	B	Did not start								
