= Theerapong Silachai =

Thai weightlifter (born 2003)

Personal information
- Nickname: Fang
- Nationality: Thai
- Born: 19 November 2003 (age 22) Khun Han, Sisaket, Thailand
- Weight: 59.99 kg (132 lb)

Sport
- Country: Thailand
- Sport: Weightlifting
- Events: –55 kg, –61 kg
- Club: Sisaket Provincial Weightlifting Association

Achievements and titles
- Personal bests: Snatch: 132 kg (2023); Clean & Jerk: 167 kg (2023, CJWR); Total: 299 kg (2023, CJWR)
Medal record
Representing Thailand
Olympic Games
Silver medal – second place	2024 Paris	–61 kg
World Championships
Gold medal – first place	2022 Bogotá	–55 kg
Silver medal – second place	2025 Førde	60kg
Asian Games
Bronze medal – third place	2026 Aichi–Nagoya	60 kg
Asian Championships
Bronze medal – third place	2023 Jinju	–61 kg

Theerapong Silachai (Thai: ธีรพงศ์ ศิลาชัย; born 19 November 2003) is a Thai weightlifter competing in the men's 61 kg category. He is a silver medalist in the Weightlifting Men's 61 kg category at the 2024 Summer Olympics in Paris, France. He is regarded as the first Thai male weightlifter Olympic silver medalist. He won a gold medal at the 2022 World Weightlifting Championships.

== Early life ==
Born into a middle-class family where his father was a trader in Sisaket, a province in lower Isan (northeast Thailand) bordering Cambodia. His father's financial status was not good, so his family had to live in his aunt's house with other relatives. Therefore, Silachai intended to buy a house for his father with the compensation from being an athlete. He started training in weightlifting in 2015.

== Career ==
As a youth lifter, Silachai's first known competition was at the Khun Dan Games in Nakhon Nayok, competing in the men's 50 kg category. He lifted 90 kilograms in the snatch and 115 in the clean and jerk for a 205 kilogram total, winning the gold medal.

Still as a youth lifter, Silachai participated in the 2020 edition at Nakhon Sawan and 2021 edition at Chiang Mai of the Thailand Weightlifting Championships, winning gold on both occasions. Lifting 100 kilograms in the snatch and 134 kilograms in the clean and jerk for a 234 kilogram total in the 2020 edition breaking national youth records in the clean and jerk and total, and lifting 106 kilograms in the snatch and 125 kilograms in the clean and jerk for a 231 kilogram total in the 2021 edition.

As a junior, he participated at the 47th Thailand National Games, competing in the men's 55 kg category winning gold in all three lifts. Lifting 110 kilograms in the snatch, 142 kilograms in the clean and jerk, and a 252 kilogram total.

In 2022, Silachai participated at the 2022 World Weightlifting Championships for his first ever IWF sanctioned event, winning gold in the men's 55 kg category, lifting 265 kilograms in total, breaking junior world records in the clean and jerk at 148 kilograms and 265 kilograms in the total.

In 2023, Silachai went up a class at the 2023 Asian Weightlifting Championships, competing in the men's 61 kg category. He lifted 299 kilograms in total, earning bronze and setting new junior world records in the clean and jerk with 167 kilograms and in the total with 299 kilograms.

In 2024 Summer Olympics, he participated at men's 61 kg event and successfully secured the silver medal. He lifted 303 kilograms only seven kilograms less than Li Fabin.

== Major results ==
Year	Venue	Weight	Snatch (kg)				Clean & Jerk (kg)				Total	Rank
Year	Venue	Weight	1	2	3	Rank	1	2	3	Rank	Total	Rank
Summer Olympics
2024	Paris, France	61 kg	127	130	132	—N/a	167	169	171	—N/a	303	2nd place, silver medalist(s)
World Championships
2022	Bogotá, Colombia	55 kg	~~117~~	117	~~119~~	4	144	147	148 CJWR	1st place, gold medalist(s)	265 JWR	1st place, gold medalist(s)
2023	Riyadh, Saudi Arabia	61 kg	110	115	~~120~~	28	140	150	—	23	265	25
2025	Førde, Norway	60 kg	125	~~129~~	129	3rd place, bronze medalist(s)	160	167	170	1st place, gold medalist(s)	299	2nd place, silver medalist(s)
Asian Games
2023	Hangzhou, China	61 kg	~~128~~	~~128~~	~~128~~	—N/a	—	—	—	—N/a	—	—
2026	Nagoya, Japan	60 kg	~~126~~	~~126~~	126	—N/a	165	173	~~176~~	—N/a	299	3rd place, bronze medalist(s)
Asian Championships
2023	Jinju, South Korea	61 kg	127	130	132	4	162	164	167 JWR	3rd place, bronze medalist(s)	299 JWR	3rd place, bronze medalist(s)
