= Hôtel de Ville, Saint-Médard-en-Jalles =

Town hall in Saint-Médard-en-Jalles, France

Hôtel de Ville
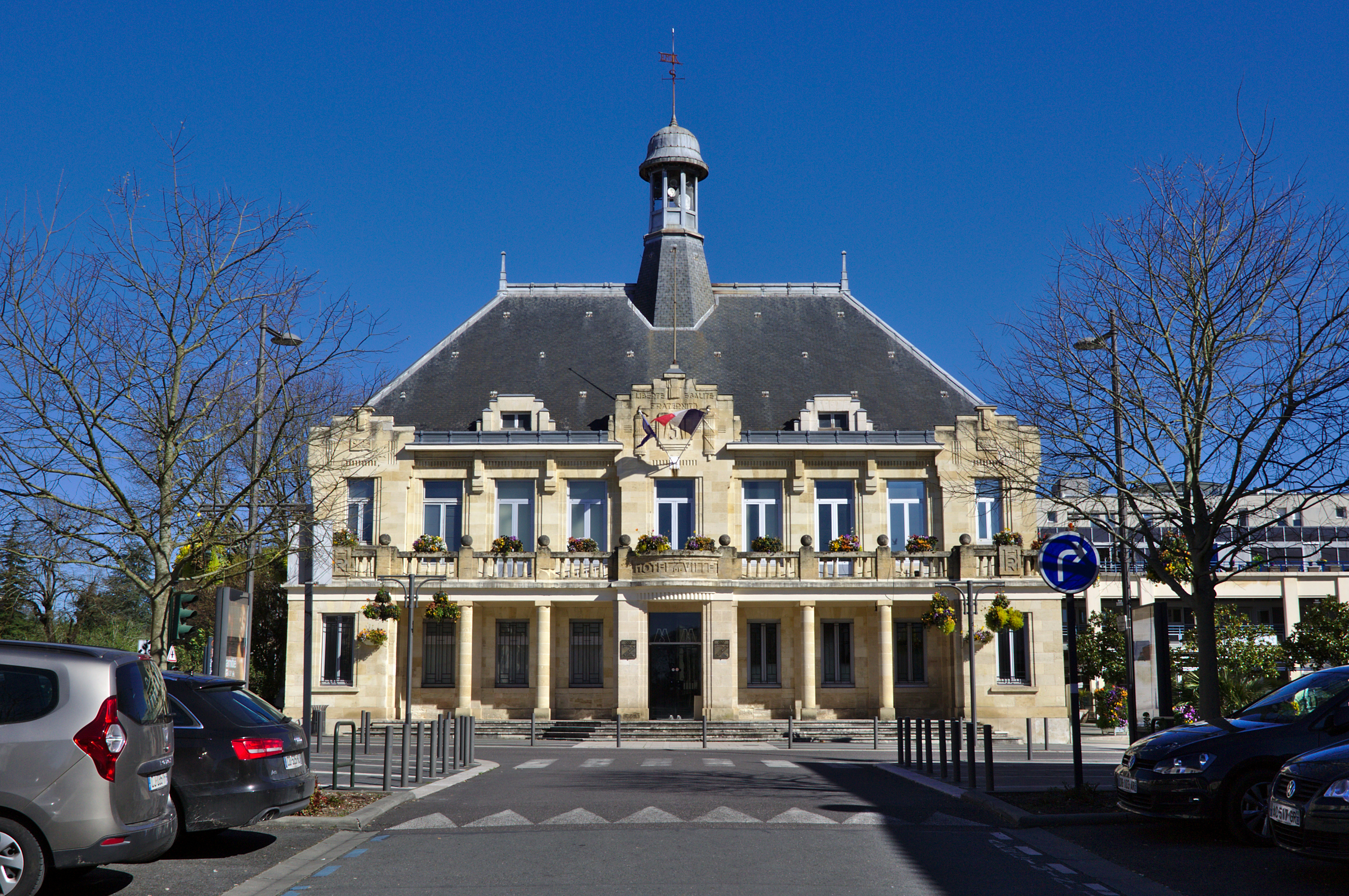
- The main frontage of the Hôtel de Ville in April 2015
- Interactive map of the Hôtel de Ville area

General information
- Type: City hall
- Architectural style: Art Deco style
- Location: Saint-Médard-en-Jalles, France
- Coordinates: 44.8957°N 0.7173°W
- Completed: 1936

Design and construction
- Architect: Albert Dumons

The Hôtel de Ville (French pronunciation: [otɛl də vil], City Hall) is a municipal building in Saint-Médard-en-Jalles, Gironde, in southwestern France, standing on Avenue Montesquieu.

== History ==
Following the French Revolution, the town council initially met in the house of the mayor at the time. This arrangement continued until the council commissioned a combined school and town hall on a site acquired from the Delmestre family in 1855.

In the mid-1880s, following significant population growth largely associated with the gunpowder industry, the council led by the mayor, Charles Chaumel, decided to acquire a more substantial property. The building they selected was a single-storey building owned by the Thévenard family on the north side of Avenue Montesquieu dating from the first half of the 18th century. The original design involved a symmetrical main frontage of nine bays facing onto the street. The central bay, which was slightly projected forward, featured a round headed doorway, which was surmounted by an iron canopy, an entablature, a cornice and a balustraded parapet. The other bays were fenestrated by casement windows with voussoirs. There were three small dormer windows at roof level. A former notary, Frédéric Thévenard, served as mayor from December 1851 to June 1866 and, on his retirement, made the house and associated vineyards available to the council in July 1886.

In the 1930s, the council led by the mayor, Antonin Larroque, decided to enlarge the town hall. It was remodelled by the municipal architect, Albert Dumons, in the Art Deco style, with an extra floor being added and the façade modernised, and was officially re-opened in June 1936. In front of the original structure, a seven-bay arcade was established on the ground floor and a nine-bay balcony, fronted by a balustrade, was created on the first floor. The central bay was flanked by two square columns supporting a curved section of the balcony and the central and end bays were surmounted by Art Deco style stepped gables. At roof level, there was an octagonal belfry surmounted by a dome. The sculptures on the gables were carved by Edmond Tuffet and two large murals in the building were painted by Jean-André Caverne in the mid-1930s.

Following the liberation of the town on 26 August 1944, during the Second World War, there were celebrations in the streets and the tricolour was flown from the town hall and the gunpowder factory, then known as OPA (Omnium des Produits Azotiques) and later as SNPE (Société Nationale des Poudres et des Explosifs).

In December 2022, council meetings were transferred to the newly refurbished Pierre-Mendès-France Centre behind the town hall.
