= 2025 World Weightlifting Championships – Men's 60 kg =

Men's 60 kg at the 2025 World Weightlifting Championships
- Venue: Førdehuset
- Location: Førde, Norway
- Dates: 3 October
- Competitors: 22 from 21 nations
- Winning total: 302 kg

Medalists
gold medal	Wang Hao	China
silver medal	Theerapong Silachai	Thailand
bronze medal	Pang Un-chol	North Korea

The men's 60 kilograms competition at the 2025 World Weightlifting Championships was held on 3 October 2025.

== Schedule ==
Date	Time	Event
3 October 2025	12:00	Group B
3 October 2025	19:30	Group A

== Records ==
Prior to this competition, the existing world records were as follows.

World record	Snatch	World Standard	141 kg	—	1 June 2025
World record	Clean & Jerk	World Standard	172 kg	—	1 June 2025
World record	Total	World Standard	307 kg	—	1 June 2025

== Results ==
Rank	Athlete	Group	Snatch (kg)				Clean & Jerk (kg)				Total
Rank	Athlete	Group	1	2	3	Rank	1	2	3	Rank	Total
1st place, gold medalist(s)	Wang Hao (CHN)	A	133	138	—	1st place, gold medalist(s)	157	161	164	3rd place, bronze medalist(s)	302
2nd place, silver medalist(s)	Theerapong Silachai (THA)	A	125	~~129~~	129	3rd place, bronze medalist(s)	160	167	170	1st place, gold medalist(s)	299
3rd place, bronze medalist(s)	Pang Un-chol (PRK)	A	123	127	~~130~~	5	163	168	~~171~~	2nd place, silver medalist(s)	295
4	Goderdzi Berdelidze (GEO)	A	125	128	~~130~~	4	148	~~154~~	155	7	283
5	Yuan Hao (CHN)	A	~~127~~	128	132; JWR	2nd place, silver medalist(s)	~~148~~	149	~~152~~	12	281
6	Elsayed Aly (EGY)	A	121	124	~~126~~	7	~~154~~	154; AF	~~162~~	8	278; AF
7	Thiago Silva (BRA)	A	118	~~122~~	123	9	155	~~160~~	~~163~~	6	278
8	Fernando Agad (PHI)	B	118	120	~~122~~	11	150	155	~~159~~	5	275
9	Kaito Hirai (JPN)	B	113	117	~~119~~	15	150	154	158	4	275
10	Garnik Cholakyan (ARM)	A	123	~~128~~	~~130~~	8	152	~~157~~	—	10	275
11	Rishikanta Chanambam (IND)	B	117	~~120~~	~~122~~	14	148	152	~~155~~	9	269
12	Mansour Al-Saleem (KSA)	A	118	122	~~125~~	10	~~144~~	~~145~~	145	13	267
13	Aniq Kasdan (MAS)	B	115	~~120~~	~~120~~	16	146	151	~~155~~	11	266
14	Deniz Danev (BUL)	B	~~113~~	~~113~~	113	17	140	~~143~~	~~145~~	14	253
15	José Poox (MEX)	B	105	~~110~~	~~110~~	19	137	~~145~~	~~149~~	15	242
16	Joshua Mboya (KEN)	B	105	110	~~115~~	18	125	131	~~135~~	16	241
17	Wang Wen-che (TPE)	B	95	105	~~110~~	20	115	128	~~132~~	17	233
18	Davis Niyoyita (UGA)	B	95	100	~~105~~	21	120	125	~~130~~	18	225
19	Mohammad Al-Otaibi (KUW)	B	75	79	81	22	97	101	106	19	187
—	Angel Rusev (BUL)	A	118	~~121~~	~~121~~	13	~~150~~	~~150~~	~~152~~	—	—
—	Gabriel Chhum (USA)	A	120	~~123~~	125	6	~~151~~	~~152~~	~~152~~	—	—
—	Kim Kyung-min (KOR)	B	~~118~~	118	~~121~~	12	~~145~~	~~145~~	~~145~~	—	—
—	Fahad Al-Otaibi (KUW)	B	Did not start								
—	Marian Luca (ROU)	B	Did not start								
