= 2022 World Weightlifting Championships – Men's 73 kg =

The men's 73 kilograms competition at the 2022 World Weightlifting Championships was held on 9 December 2022.

== Schedule ==
Date	Time	Event
9 December 2022	11:30	Group C
9 December 2022	14:00	Group B
9 December 2022	19:00	Group A

== Medalists ==
Event	Gold		Silver		Bronze	
Snatch	Rizki Juniansyah (INA)	155 kg	Bozhidar Andreev (BUL)	154 kg	Alexey Churkin (KAZ)	153 kg
Clean & Jerk	Rahmat Erwin Abdullah (INA)	200 kg	Rizki Juniansyah (INA)	192 kg	Alexey Churkin (KAZ)	190 kg
Total	Rahmat Erwin Abdullah (INA)	352 kg	Rizki Juniansyah (INA)	347 kg	Alexey Churkin (KAZ)	343 kg

== Records ==
Prior to this competition, the existing world records were as follows.

World record	Snatch	Shi Zhiyong (CHN)	169 kg	Tashkent, Uzbekistan	20 April 2021
World record	Clean & Jerk	Shi Zhiyong (CHN)	198 kg	Tianjin, China	10 December 2019
World record	Total	Shi Zhiyong (CHN)	364 kg	Tokyo, Japan	28 July 2021

== Results ==
Rank	Athlete	Group	Snatch (kg)				Clean & Jerk (kg)				Total
Rank	Athlete	Group	1	2	3	Rank	1	2	3	Rank	Total
1st place, gold medalist(s)	Rahmat Erwin Abdullah (INA)	B	152	~~157~~	~~157~~	4	192	~~200~~	200 WR	1st place, gold medalist(s)	352
2nd place, silver medalist(s)	Rizki Juniansyah (INA)	A	150	155	~~158~~	1st place, gold medalist(s)	187	192	~~198~~	2nd place, silver medalist(s)	347
3rd place, bronze medalist(s)	Alexey Churkin (KAZ)	B	145	150	153	3rd place, bronze medalist(s)	181	186	190	3rd place, bronze medalist(s)	343
4	Bozhidar Andreev (BUL)	A	150	~~154~~	154	2nd place, silver medalist(s)	180	184	~~190~~	7	338
5	Masanori Miyamoto (JPN)	B	145	150	~~155~~	6	180	187	~~190~~	4	337
6	Suttipong Jeeram (THA)	A	~~148~~	148	151	5	178	182	~~187~~	8	333
7	Yuan Chengfei (CHN)	A	150	~~156~~	~~156~~	7	181	~~191~~	~~191~~	9	331
8	Muhammed Furkan Özbek (TUR)	A	~~145~~	145	~~145~~	15	~~186~~	186	~~191~~	5	331
9	Wei Yinting (CHN)	A	150	~~155~~	~~156~~	8	180	~~185~~	~~185~~	11	330
10	Kakhi Asanidze (GEO)	B	144	148	~~151~~	10	174	179	~~183~~	12	327
11	Max Lang (GER)	B	140	143	146	12	175	180	~~185~~	10	326
12	Mitsunori Konnai (JPN)	B	140	~~145~~	147	11	170	178	~~187~~	13	325
13	Jorge Cárdenas (MEX)	B	140	~~145~~	145	14	~~170~~	170	176	14	321
14	Ritvars Suharevs (LAT)	B	~~143~~	143	~~146~~	16	~~172~~	172	176	15	319
15	Piotr Kudłaszyk (POL)	B	134	137	~~139~~	21	171	174	~~170~~	16	311
16	Samir Fardjallah (ALG)	C	135	140	~~145~~	18	~~170~~	170	~~175~~	19	310
17	Maksat Meredow (TKM)	C	137	~~141~~	~~141~~	20	165	170	—	17	307
18	Jorge Hernández (HON)	C	130	~~134~~	134	22	165	170	~~175~~	18	304
19	Ahsaan Shabi (LBA)	C	130	136	138	19	160	~~168~~	~~170~~	20	298
20	Ditto Titus Ika (NRU)	C	105	110	~~112~~	23	140	~~145~~	145	21	255
21	Ibrahim Nsubuga (UGA)	C	85	90	95	24	115	122	~~125~~	22	217
—	Jeong Han-sol (KOR)	A	~~145~~	~~145~~	~~146~~	—	185	~~191~~	~~191~~	6	—
—	Briken Calja (ALB)	A	~~150~~	150	~~154~~	9	~~185~~	—	—	—	—
—	Julio Cedeño (DOM)	B	140	145	~~149~~	13	~~172~~	~~172~~	~~172~~	—	—
—	Jacob Horst (USA)	C	140	~~144~~	~~144~~	17	~~168~~	~~170~~	~~176~~	—	—
—	Mirko Zanni (ITA)	A	~~150~~	~~151~~	~~153~~	—	—	—	—	—	—
—	Bak Joo-hyo (KOR)	A	~~148~~	~~148~~	~~149~~	—	~~186~~	~~188~~	~~191~~	—	—
—	Julio Mayora (VEN)	A	~~148~~	~~150~~	~~153~~	—	—	—	—	—	—
—	Ryan Grimsland (USA)	B	~~138~~	~~138~~	~~139~~	—	—	—	—	—	—
—	Nawaf Al-Mazyadi (KSA)	C	~~135~~	~~135~~	~~136~~	—	~~165~~	~~165~~	~~165~~	—	—
—	Achinta Sheuli (IND)	C	Did not start								—
