= 2024 World Weightlifting Championships – Men's 55 kg =

Men's 55 kg at the 2024 World Weightlifting Championships
- Venue: Weightlifting Marquee Venue
- Location: Manama, Bahrain
- Dates: 6 December
- Competitors: 14 from 10 nations
- Winning total: 273 kg

Medalists
gold medal	Natthawat Chomchuen	Thailand
silver medal	Thiago Silva	Brazil
bronze medal	Fernando Agad	Philippines

The men's 55 kilograms competition at the 2024 World Weightlifting Championships was held on 6 December 2024.

== Schedule ==
Date	Time	Event
6 December 2024	20:00	Group A

== Records ==
Prior to this competition, the existing world records were as follows.

World Record	Snatch	World Standard	135 kg	—	1 November 2018
World Record	Clean & Jerk	Om Yun-chol (PRK)	166 kg	Pattaya, Thailand	18 September 2019
World Record	Total	Om Yun-chol (PRK)	294 kg	Pattaya, Thailand	18 September 2019

== Results ==
Rank	Athlete	Group	Snatch (kg)				Clean & Jerk (kg)				Total
Rank	Athlete	Group	1	2	3	Rank	1	2	3	Rank	Total
1st place, gold medalist(s)	Natthawat Chomchuen (THA)	A	117	~~120~~	120	3rd place, bronze medalist(s)	147	150	153	2nd place, silver medalist(s)	273
2nd place, silver medalist(s)	Thiago Silva (BRA)	A	114	118	121	1st place, gold medalist(s)	142	145	148	3rd place, bronze medalist(s)	269
3rd place, bronze medalist(s)	Fernando Agad (PHI)	A	113	116	~~119~~	6	143	147	~~149~~	4	263
4	Mansour Al-Saleem (KSA)	A	114	~~119~~	119	4	139	143	~~146~~	6	262
5	Yang Yang (CHN)	A	~~120~~	120	~~122~~	2nd place, silver medalist(s)	~~140~~	140	~~144~~	7	260
6	Angel Rusev (BUL)	A	~~110~~	110	~~113~~	7	135	141	144	5	254
7	Dzhan Zarkov (BUL)	A	95	100	104	9	130	137	140	8	244
8	José Poox (MEX)	A	100	105	~~107~~	8	130	135	138	9	243
9	Juan Barco (MEX)	A	~~99~~	~~99~~	99	11	123	~~129~~	—	10	222
10	Abdullah Basel (YEM)	A	85	87	89	12	~~105~~	~~105~~	105	11	194
—	Ngô Sơn Đỉnh (VIE)	A	118	~~120~~	~~121~~	5	—	—	—	—	—
—	Rahimi Bin Sulaiman Mohamad (MAS)	A	101	~~106~~	~~108~~	10	~~127~~	~~130~~	~~130~~	—	—
—	Pang Un-chol (PRK)	A	~~117~~	~~117~~	~~117~~	—	150	~~154~~	154	1st place, gold medalist(s)	—
—	Lại Gia Thành (VIE)	A	~~117~~	~~119~~	~~119~~	—	~~144~~	~~146~~	~~146~~	—	—
