= Thiago Silva (weightlifter) =

Brazilian weightlifter

Personal information
- Full name: Thiago Felix da Silva
- Born: December 26, 2000 (age 25)

Sport
- Country: Brazil
- Sport: Weightlifting
- Weight class: 61 kg; 65 kg
Medal record
Men's weightlifting
Representing Brazil
World Championships
Silver medal – second place	2024 Manama	55 kg
Pan American Championships
Gold medal – first place	2025 Cali	61 kg
Silver medal – second place	2021 Guayaquil	61 kg
Bronze medal – third place	2026 Panama City	65 kg
South American Games
Gold medal – first place	2022 Asunción	61 kg
Bronze medal – third place	2026 Santa Fe	65 kg

Thiago Felix da Silva is a Brazilian weightlifter. He won the gold medal in men's 61 kg event at the 2022 South American Games held in Asunción, Paraguay. He also won the silver medal in the men's 61 kg event at the 2021 Pan American Weightlifting Championships held in Guayaquil, Ecuador.

He competed in the men's 61 kg event at the 2022 World Weightlifting Championships held in Bogotá, Colombia.

== Achievements ==
Year	Venue	Weight	Snatch (kg)				Clean & Jerk (kg)				Total	Rank
Year	Venue	Weight	1	2	3	Rank	1	2	3	Rank	Total	Rank
World Championships
2022	Bogotá, Colombia	61 kg	~~120~~	~~120~~	120	21	150	~~154~~	~~154~~	21	270	20
2024	Manama, Bahrain	55 kg	114	118	121	1st place, gold medalist(s)	142	145	148	3rd place, bronze medalist(s)	269	2nd place, silver medalist(s)
2025	Førde, Norway	60 kg	118	~~122~~	123	9	155	~~160~~	~~163~~	6	278	7
2026	Ningbo, China	65 kg	~~126~~	126	~~130~~	21	~~162~~	~~162~~	~~165~~	__	DNF	__
Pan American Championships
2021	Guayaquil, Ecuador	61 kg	110	115	118	1st place, gold medalist(s)	140	~~146~~	149	3rd place, bronze medalist(s)	267	2nd place, silver medalist(s)
2022	Bogotá, Colombia	61 kg	112	~~118~~	~~122~~	9	140	145	151	4	263	6
2025	Cali, Colombia	60 kg	115	120	~~123~~	2nd place, silver medalist(s)	149	153	158	1st place, gold medalist(s)	278	1st place, gold medalist(s)
2026	Panama City, Panama	65 kg	125	128	132	4	165	170	~~175~~	3rd place, bronze medalist(s)	302	3rd place, bronze medalist(s)
South American Games
2022	Asunción, Paraguay	61 kg	115	120	122	—N/a	~~143~~	144	149	—N/a	271	1st place, gold medalist(s)
