= 2025 World Weightlifting Championships – Men's 71 kg =

Men's 71 kg at the 2025 World Weightlifting Championships
- Venue: Førdehuset
- Location: Førde, Norway
- Dates: 5 October
- Competitors: 26 from 20 nations
- Winning total: 346 kg CWR

Medalists
gold medal	Weeraphon Wichuma	Thailand
silver medal	Masanori Miyamoto	Japan
bronze medal	He Yueji	China

The men's 71 kilograms competition at the 2025 World Weightlifting Championships was held on 5 October 2025.

== Schedule ==
Date	Time	Event
5 October 2025	10:00	Group C
5 October 2025	12:00	Group B
5 October 2025	19:30	Group A

== Records ==
Prior to this competition, the existing world records were as follows.

World record	Snatch	World Standard	156 kg	—	1 June 2025
World record	Clean & Jerk	Sebastián Olivares (COL)	191 kg	Cali, Colombia	15 July 2025
World record	Total	World Standard	340 kg	—	1 June 2025

== Results ==
Rank	Athlete	Group	Snatch (kg)				Clean & Jerk (kg)				Total
Rank	Athlete	Group	1	2	3	Rank	1	2	3	Rank	Total
1st place, gold medalist(s)	Weeraphon Wichuma (THA)	A	148	152	~~156~~	4	~~190~~	190	194 WR	1st place, gold medalist(s)	346 WR
2nd place, silver medalist(s)	Masanori Miyamoto (JPN)	A	148	152	~~156~~	3rd place, bronze medalist(s)	186	193 WR	~~195~~	2nd place, silver medalist(s)	345 WR
3rd place, bronze medalist(s)	He Yueji (CHN)	A	153	157 WR	160 CWR	1st place, gold medalist(s)	181	184	~~188~~	6	344WR
4	Yusuf Fehmi Genç (TUR)	A	~~150~~	~~151~~	151	6	186	190	192 ER WR	3rd place, bronze medalist(s)	343 ER
5	Ri Won-ju (PRK)	A	143	148	152	5	~~190~~	190	~~195~~	4	342
6	Isa Rustamov (AZE)	A	143	~~147~~	148	8	175	180	~~184~~	7	328
7	Kaan Kahriman (TUR)	A	148	~~151~~	~~151~~	7	172	176	180	8	328
8	Albert Delos Santos (PHI)	B	133	137	~~140~~	12	175	180	185 WJR	5	322
9	Ajith Narayana (IND)	B	~~145~~	145	~~149~~	9	166	171	175	11	320
10	Kotaro Sato (JPN)	B	~~136~~	136	~~140~~	13	176	~~186~~	~~187~~	9	312
11	Bernardin Matam (FRA)	B	~~138~~	138	~~142~~	11	173	~~180~~	~~180~~	12	311
12	Chen Wang-heng (TPE)	B	135	138	141	10	160	169	~~172~~	13	310
13	Ardaraya (INA)	B	~~132~~	132	~~136~~	15	170	175	~~177~~	10	307
14	Jonathan Muñoz (MEX)	B	131	135	~~138~~	14	160	165	~~170~~	14	300
15	Sergio Cares (CHI)	B	123	126	129	16	155	161	164	15	293
16	Liu Yung-fu (TPE)	C	115	~~120~~	122	17	146	152	156	16	278
17	Ismail Rachidi (MAR)	C	115	~~119~~	~~119~~	18	150	155	~~160~~	17	270
18	Stefan Rønnevik (NOR)	C	115	~~118~~	~~118~~	19	140	145	~~150~~	18	260
19	Rasmus Aune (NOR)	C	102	105	108	20	138	143	~~148~~	19	251
20	Eissa Shaher (KUW)	C	75	~~80~~	80	21	90	~~100~~	~~100~~	20	170
—	Gor Sahakyan (ARM)	A	150	~~154~~	154 ER	2nd place, silver medalist(s)	~~182~~	~~182~~	~~182~~	—	—
—	Sebastián Olivares (COL)	A	~~149~~	—	—	—	—	—	—	—	—
—	Jorge Cárdenas (MEX)	B	~~140~~	~~140~~	~~140~~	—	—	—	—	—	—
X	Jonathan Chin (CWF)	B	120	124	128	X	159	163	~~167~~	X	291
X	Corey Duncan (CWF)	C	118	~~122~~	~~122~~	X	149	155	~~157~~	X	273
X	Karl McClean (CWF)	C	105	109	112	X	140	145	150	X	262
