= Yang Yang (weightlifter) =

Chinese weightlifter (born 2002)

Personal information
- Born: 23 July 2002 (age 24)

Sport
- Country: China
- Sport: Weightlifting
- Weight class: 60 kg
Medal record
Men's weightlifting
Representing China
World Championships
Gold medal – first place	2026 Ningbo	60 kg
Asian Games
Gold medal – first place	2026 Aichi–Nagoya	60 kg

Yang Yang (Chinese: 杨洋; born 23 July 2002), is a Chinese weightlifter. He is a 2026 World Weightlifting Championships and 2026 Asian Games gold medalist.

== Career ==
In September 2026, he competed at the 2026 Asian Games and won a gold medal in the 60 kg event. He opened the event with 138 kg in the snatch. He followed it up with 166 kg in the clean and jerk, before finishing with an Asian Games record total lift of 304 kg. The next month he competed at the 2026 World Weightlifting Championships and won a gold medal in the 60 kg event. He opened the event with 136 kg in the snatch. He followed it up with 168 kg in the clean and jerk, before finishing with a total lift of 304 kg.

== Major results ==
Year	Venue	Weight	Snatch (kg)				Clean & Jerk (kg)				Total	Rank
Year	Venue	Weight	1	2	3	Rank	1	2	3	Rank	Total	Rank
World Championships
2024	Manama, Bahrain	55 kg	~~120~~	120	~~122~~	2nd place, silver medalist(s)	~~140~~	140	~~144~~	7	260	5
2026	Ningbo, China	60 kg	132	136	~~139~~	1st place, gold medalist(s)	162	168	~~171~~	3rd place, bronze medalist(s)	304	1st place, gold medalist(s)
Asian Games
2026	Nagoya, Japan	60 kg	132	136	138	—N/a	160	164	166	—N/a	304	1st place, gold medalist(s)
