= Weightlifting at the 2024 Summer Olympics – Men's 73 kg =

Men's 73 kg at the Games of the XXXIII Olympiad
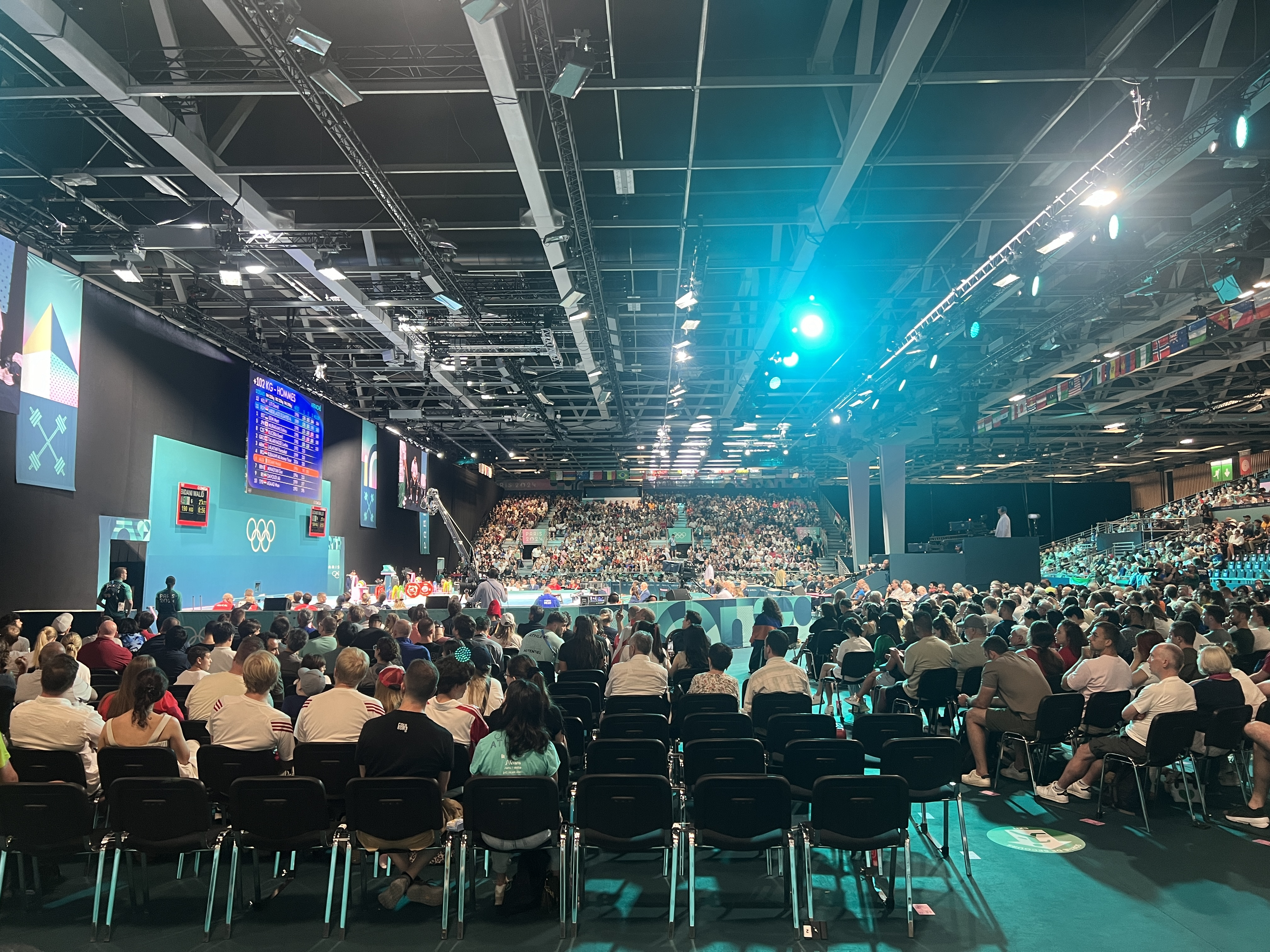
- Interior of the Paris Expo Porte de Versailles
- Venue: Paris Expo Porte de Versailles
- Date: 8 August 2024
- Competitors: 12 from 12 nations
- Winning total: 354 kg

Medalists
1st place, gold medalist(s)		Rizki Juniansyah	Indonesia
2nd place, silver medalist(s)		Weeraphon Wichuma	Thailand
3rd place, bronze medalist(s)		Bozhidar Andreev	Bulgaria

The men's 73 kg weightlifting competition at the 2024 Summer Olympics was held on 8 August at the Paris Expo Porte de Versailles.

Going into the competition, Rizki Juniansyah of Indonesia was the favourite, while previous Olympic champion and snatch world record holder Shi Zhiyong of China and 2023 World Champion Weeraphon Wichuma of Thailand were also among the top contenders. Clean and jerk world record holder Rahmat Erwin Abdullah of Indonesia was also a favourite to win but was unable to compete for the nation due to Juniansyah's qualifying total being higher. In the final, Shi was leading by 10 kilograms after the snatch portion of the event but was eliminated after failing his clean and jerk attempts due to a back injury he sustained from a previous competition. In the end, Juniansyah won gold with a total of 354 kg, followed by Wichuma winning silver with a total of 346 kg, and Bozhidar Andreev of Bulgaria winning bronze with a total of 344 kg.

== Background ==
Shi Zhiyong of China was the defending Olympic champion in the men's 73 kg. At the 2022 World Weightlifting Championships, the first eligible event during the qualification timeline, Rahmat Erwin Abdullah of Indonesia placed first, defending his 2021 world title, and broke a world record in the clean and jerk with 200 kilograms. In the same event, his teammate Rizki Juniansyah placed second. He then competed at the 2023 World Weightlifting Championships but in the men's 81 kg event. There, he set a world record with a clean and jerk of 209 kilograms. In the men's 73 kg event, Weeraphon Wichuma of Thailand won gold. At the 2023 IWF Grand Prix II, Ritvars Suharevs of Latvia placed first with a total of 341 kilograms. It was also the first competition Shi had competed in for 862 days, placing second for his first defeat in international competition.

Abdullah placed first at the 2024 Asian Weightlifting Championships and set a new clean and jerk world record of 204 kilograms. Juniansyah placed second, 10 kilograms behind Abdullah's total of 363 kilograms. At the 2024 European Weightlifting Championships, Bozhidar Andreev set new European records in the clean and jerk with 193 kilograms and the total with 348 kilograms. The 2024 IWF World Cup was the last competition during the qualification period. There, Juniansyah placed first with a new total world record of 365 kilograms, placing above Shi and displacing Abdullah out of the qualification rankings due to his total being higher than Abdullah's and due to the fact that per National Olympic Committee (NOC), only one athlete is allowed in a weightlifting event.

Sports Illustrated predicted that Juniansyah would win, followed by Wichuma in second and Shi in third. Prior to his elimination from qualification, Abdullah was a gold medal favourite for the event.

=== Qualification ===
Qualification for every event had spots for a maximum of twelve weightlifters, each coming from a different NOC. Qualification spots were allocated to the ten highest-ranked weightlifters in the IWF Olympic Qualification Ranking, the highest-ranked weightlifter representing an NOC whose continent lies outside the top ten (IWF Olympic Continental Qualification Ranking), the host nation's reserved entry, and an athlete qualifying for universality. If a spot was still available once every continent was represented in the top ten, the host nation did not send an entry, a universality place was not used, or any combination of the previous, the quota place was allocated to the next highest-ranked eligible weightlifter.

To be eligible for the event, all weightlifters must have competed at the 2023 World Weightlifting Championships in Riyadh, 2024 IWF World Cup in Phuket, and in at least three other qualifying tournaments. (Note: Qualifying tournaments besides the 2023 World Weightlifting Championships and 2024 IWF World Cup included the 2022 World Weightlifting Championships, 2023 Continental Senior Championships, approved 2023 Continental Senior Games, two editions of the 2023 IWF Grand Prix, and 2024 Continental Senior Championships.) (Note: Except in "truly exceptional circumstances" as per the IOC.) Apart from the two compulsory events, the entrant from the host country France and those who may be eligible for universality places had to have competed in a minimum of two other qualifying tournaments. For the men's 73 kg category, twelve athletes qualified for the event with the absence of a universality place.

Qualified weightlifters
Weightlifter	Country	Total (kg)	Qualification
Rizki Juniansyah	Indonesia	365	Ranking
Shi Zhiyong	China	356	Ranking
Masanori Miyamoto	Japan	350	Ranking
Weeraphon Wichuma	Thailand	349	Ranking
Bozhidar Andreev	Bulgaria	348	Ranking
Bak Joo-hyo	South Korea	345	Ranking
Ritvars Suharevs	Latvia	341	Ranking
Muhammed Furkan Özbek	Turkey	341	Ranking
Julio Mayora	Venezuela	339	Ranking
Luis Javier Mosquera	Colombia	337	Ranking
Karem Ben Hnia	Tunisia	332	Continental ranking
Bernardin Matam	France	—	Host entry

=== Records ===
The world records before the competition were the snatch that was set by Shi at the 2021 Asian Weightlifting Championships, the clean and jerk set by Abdullah at the 2024 Asian Weightlifting Championships, and the total set by Juniansyah at the 2024 IWF World Cup. The Olympic records in the snatch, clean and jerk, and total were all set by Shi at the 2020 Summer Olympics.

Records before the competition
World Record	Snatch	Shi Zhiyong (CHN)	169 kg	Tashkent, Uzbekistan	20 April 2021
World Record	Clean & Jerk	Rahmat Erwin Abdullah (INA)	204 kg	Tashkent, Uzbekistan	6 February 2024
World Record	Total	Rizki Juniansyah (INA)	365 kg	Phuket, Thailand	4 April 2024
Olympic Record	Snatch	Shi Zhiyong (CHN)	166 kg	Tokyo, Japan	28 July 2021
Olympic Record	Clean & Jerk	Shi Zhiyong (CHN)	198 kg	Tokyo, Japan	28 July 2021
Olympic Record	Total	Shi Zhiyong (CHN)	364 kg	Tokyo, Japan	28 July 2021

== Event ==
The event was held on 8 August, starting at 7:30 p.m., at the Paris Expo Porte de Versailles. Suharevs was eliminated during the snatch portion of the event after failing his first two attempts and passing on his third. Bernardin Matam of France had the lightest snatch of the event at 145 kilograms while Shi had the highest with 165 kilograms; Luis Javier Mosquera of Colombia and Juniansyah tied for the second-heaviest snatch with 155 kilograms. Julio Mayora of Venezuela and Shi were then eliminated in the clean and jerk, with the latter failing to lift all three of his attempts due to a back injury he sustained at the 2021 National Games of China. Matam had the lightest clean and jerk of the event at 175 kilograms while Juniansyah lifted 199 kilograms as the heaviest of the event, setting a new Olympic record; Özbek had the third-heaviest clean and jerk of the event at 191 kilograms while Wichuma had the second-heaviest at 198 kilograms, setting a new junior world record. With a total of 354 kilograms, Juniansyah won the Olympic title. Wichuma and Andreev placed second and third, respectively, with totals of 346 kg and 344 kg. This was Juniansyah's first Olympic gold medal.

Results
Rank	Athlete	Nation	Snatch (kg)				Clean & Jerk (kg)				Total
Rank	Athlete	Nation	1	2	3	Result	1	2	3	Result	Total
1st place, gold medalist(s)	Rizki Juniansyah	Indonesia	~~155~~	155	~~162~~	155	191	199	—	199 OR	354
2nd place, silver medalist(s)	Weeraphon Wichuma	Thailand	148	~~152~~	~~152~~	148	190	194	198	198 JWR	346
3rd place, bronze medalist(s)	Bozhidar Andreev	Bulgaria	148	152	154	154	183	187	190	190	344
4	Muhammed Furkan Özbek	Turkey	150	~~153~~	~~155~~	150	~~189~~	~~191~~	191	191	341
5	Luis Javier Mosquera	Colombia	~~150~~	150	155	155	~~185~~	185	~~189~~	185	340
6	Masanori Miyamoto	Japan	147	151	~~155~~	151	~~187~~	187	~~193~~	187	338
7	Bak Joo-hyo	South Korea	~~146~~	147	~~150~~	147	~~186~~	187	~~196~~	187	334
8	Karem Ben Hnia	Tunisia	~~145~~	145	149	149	181	~~186~~	~~187~~	181	330
9	Bernardin Matam	France	138	142	145	145	~~175~~	175	~~180~~	175	320
—	Shi Zhiyong	China	161	165	~~168~~	165	~~191~~	~~191~~	~~191~~	—	DNF
—	Julio Mayora	Venezuela	152	~~156~~	~~156~~	152	~~188~~	~~188~~	~~192~~	—	DNF
—	Ritvars Suharevs	Latvia	~~147~~	~~147~~	—	—	—	—	—	—	DNF
