= Ösökhbayaryn Chagnaadorj =

Mongolian weightlifter (born 1997)

Chagnaadorj Ösökhbayaryn
Personal information
- Native name: Өсөхбаярын Чагнаадорж
- Born: 6 May 1997 (age 29)
- Weight: 55.36 kg (122.0 lb)

Sport
- Country: Mongolia
- Sport: Weightlifting
- Team: National team
- Updated on 31 August 2016

Chagnaadorj Ösökhbayaryn (or Chagnaadorj Usukhbayar) (Mongolian: Өсөхбаярын Чагнаадорж; born 6 May 1997) is a Mongolian male weightlifter, competing in the 56 kg category and representing Mongolia at international competitions. He participated at the 2016 Summer Olympics in the men's 56 kg event. After his performance he had an IOC out-of-competition test and tested positive on exogenous testosterone. He was subsequently issued with a four-year ban by the International Weightlifting Federation that expired in August 2020.

He competed at world championships, including at the 2015 World Weightlifting Championships.

== Major results ==
Year	Venue	Weight	Snatch (kg)				Clean & Jerk (kg)				Total	Rank
Year	Venue	Weight	1	2	3	Rank	1	2	3	Rank	Total	Rank
World Championships
2015	Houston, United States	56 kg	100	~~105~~	105	25	130	~~136~~	~~136~~	26	235	25
Asian Games
2023	Hangzhou, China	61 kg	104	~~108~~	~~110~~	—N/a	~~135~~	~~135~~	~~135~~	—N/a	—	—
2026	Nagoya, Japan	65 kg	105	108	~~111~~	—N/a	130	~~138~~	~~141~~	—N/a	238	8
