= Masanori Miyamoto =

Japanese weightlifter (born 1997)

Personal information
- Born: 3 February 1997 (age 29) Naha, Japan

Sport
- Country: Japan
- Sport: Weightlifting
Medal record
Men's weightlifting
Representing Japan
World Championships
Silver medal – second place	2025 Førde	71 kg
Asian Games
Silver medal – second place	2026 Aichi–Nagoya	70 kg
Asian Championships
Gold medal – first place	2023 Jinju	73 kg
Bronze medal – third place	2020 Tashkent	73 kg
Bronze medal – third place	2024 Tashkent	73 kg

Masanori Miyamoto (宮本昌典, Miyamoto Masanori, born 3 February 1997) is a Japanese weightlifter.

== Career ==
He won a gold medal at the 2023 Asian Weightlifting Championships held at JinJu, South Korea. He also won the bronze medal in the men's 73 kg event at the 2020 Asian Weightlifting Championships held in Tashkent, Uzbekistan. He represented Japan at the 2020 Summer Olympics in Tokyo, Japan. He competed in the men's 73 kg event.

In 2018, he competed in the men's 69 kg event at the Asian Games held in Jakarta, Indonesia.

In August 2024, Miyamoto competed in the men's 73 kg event at the 2024 Summer Olympics held in Paris, France. He lifted 338 kg in total and placed sixth.

== Major results ==
Year	Venue	Weight	Snatch (kg)				Clean & Jerk (kg)				Total	Rank
Year	Venue	Weight	1	2	3	Rank	1	2	3	Rank	Total	Rank
Olympic Games
2021	Tokyo, Japan	73 kg	143	147	~~151~~	—N/a	183	188	~~196~~	—N/a	335	7
2024	Paris, France	73 kg	147	151	~~155~~	—N/a	~~187~~	187	~~193~~	—N/a	338	6
World Championships
2018	Ashgabat, Turkmenistan	73 kg	141	146	149	11	173	178	182	9	331	11
2019	Pattaya, Thailand	73 kg	140	145	~~148~~	14	175	180	183	9	328	12
2022	Bogotá, Colombia	73 kg	145	150	~~155~~	6	180	187	~~190~~	4	337	5
2023	Riyadh, Saudi Arabia	73 kg	~~147~~	147	~~151~~	10	178	183	~~188~~	7	330	8
2025	Førde, Norway	71 kg	148	152	~~156~~	3rd place, bronze medalist(s)	186	193	~~195~~	2nd place, silver medalist(s)	345	2nd place, silver medalist(s)
IWF World Cup
2019	Tianjin, China	73 kg	140	145	148	4	178	183	187	2nd place, silver medalist(s)	335	3rd place, bronze medalist(s)
2024	Phuket, Thailand	73 kg	150	~~155~~	158	4	187	192	—	4	350	4
Asian Games
2018	Jakarta, Indonesia	69 kg	~~138~~	138	~~143~~	—N/a	168	173	178	—N/a	316	8
2023	Hangzhou, China	73 kg	140	145	~~150~~	—N/a	175	180	185	—N/a	330	5
Asian Championships
2019	Ningbo, China	73 kg	~~142~~	~~142~~	~~142~~	—	—	—	—	—	—	—
2021	Tashkent, Uzbekistan	73 kg	145	~~150~~	150	4	185	~~188~~	~~188~~	4	335	3rd place, bronze medalist(s)
2023	Jinju, South Korea	73 kg	~~148~~	148	153	3rd place, bronze medalist(s)	186	~~191~~	191	3rd place, bronze medalist(s)	344	1st place, gold medalist(s)
2024	Tashkent, Uzbekistan	73 kg	~~145~~	145	150	3rd place, bronze medalist(s)	179	185	—	4	335	3rd place, bronze medalist(s)
