= Durstel =

Durstel Durschtel
- Commune
- Coat of arms
- Location of Durstel
- Location within France Location within Grand Est
- Coordinates: 48°53′32″N 7°11′53″E
- Country: France
- Region: Grand Est
- Department: Bas-Rhin
- Arrondissement: Saverne
- Canton: Ingwiller

Government
  - Mayor (2020–2026): Gérard Stutzmann
- Area^{1}: 4.76 km^{2} (1.84 sq mi)
- Highest elevation: 338 m (1,109 ft)
- Lowest elevation: 248 m (814 ft)
- Population (2023): 418
  - Density: 87.8/km^{2} (227/sq mi)
- Time zone: UTC+01:00 (CET)
  - Summer (DST): UTC+02:00 (CEST)
- INSEE/Postal code: 67111 /67320
- ^{1} French Land Register data, which excludes lakes, ponds, glaciers > 1 km^{2} (0.386 sq mi or 247 acres) and river estuaries.

Durstel (French pronunciation: [dyʁstɛl]; German: Dürstel) is a commune in the Bas-Rhin department in Grand Est in north-eastern France.

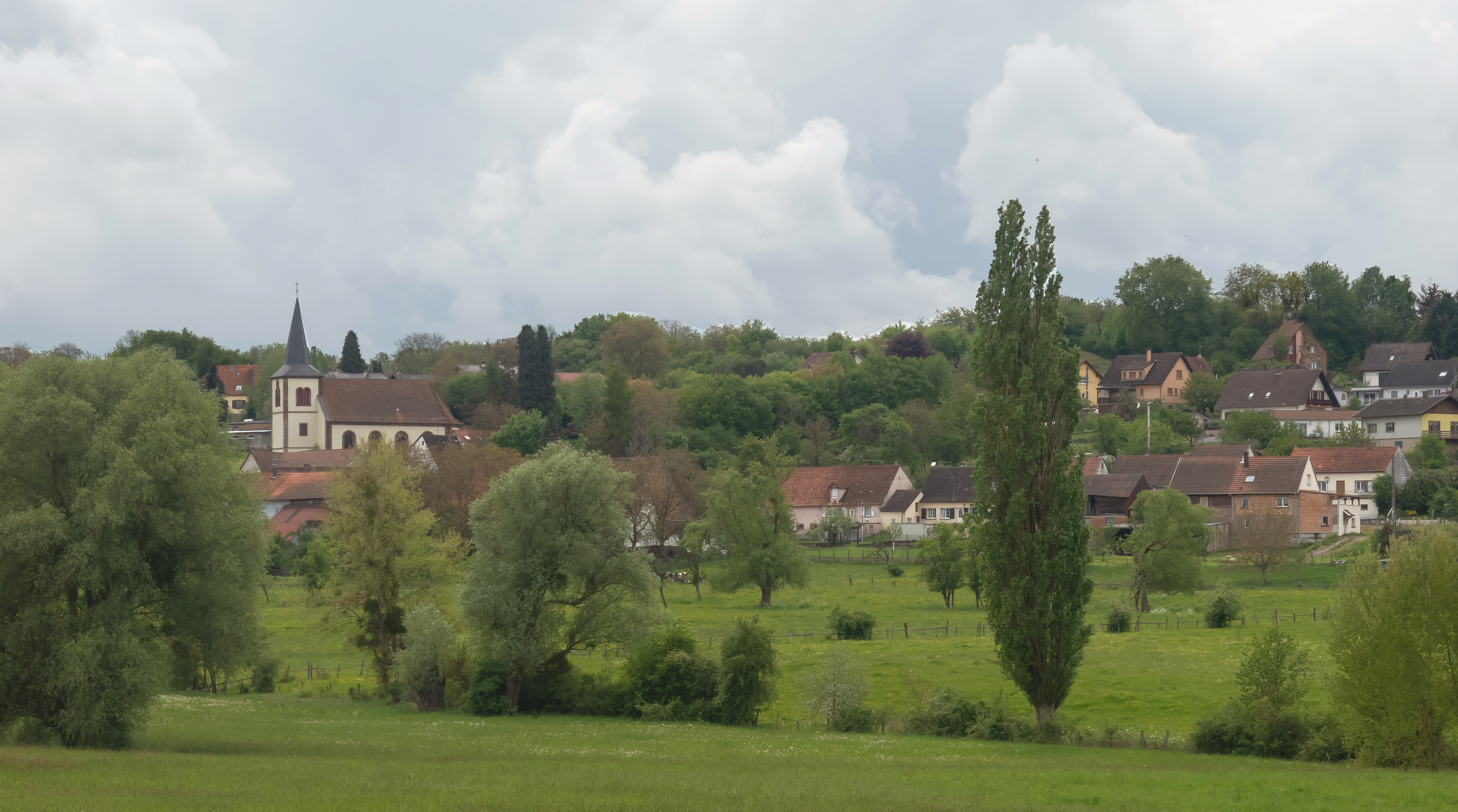
Durstel, view to the village with reformed church

== See also ==
- Communes of the Bas-Rhin department
