= Weeraphon Wichuma =

Thai weightlifter (born 2004)

Personal information
- Nickname: Wave
- Born: 10 August 2004 (age 22) Kut Wai, Sikhoraphum, Surin, Thailand

Sport
- Country: Thailand
- Sport: Weightlifting
- Weight class: 73 kg
Medal record
Representing Thailand
Olympic Games
| Silver medal – second place | 2024 Paris | 73 kg |
World Championships
| Gold medal – first place | 2023 Riyadh | 73 kg |
| Gold medal – first place | 2025 Førde | 71 kg |
| Bronze medal – third place | 2022 Bogotá | 67 kg |
| Bronze medal – third place | 2026 Ningbo | 75 kg |
Asian Games
| Silver medal – second place | 2022 Hangzhou | 73 kg |
| Silver medal – second place | 2026 Aichi–Nagoya | 75 kg |
Asian Championships
| Silver medal – second place | 2023 Jinju | 73 kg |
SEA Games
| Gold medal – first place | 2025 Bangkok | 71 kg |
Junior World Championships
| Gold medal – first place | 2022 Heraklion | 67 kg |

Weeraphon Wichuma (Thai: วีรพล วิชุมา, RTGS: Wiraphon Wichuma, Thai pronunciation: [wīː.rá.pʰōn wí.t͡ɕʰú.māː], born 10 August 2004) is a Thai weightlifter.

== Career ==
He qualified for the 2024 Summer Olympics, and won a silver medal in the Men's 73 kg category, becoming the youngest competitor to ever do so. He set a junior world record in Clear & Jerk lifting 198 kg. He was chosen to be Thailand's flagbearer for the Olympic Games Closing ceremony.

== Major results ==
| Year | Venue | Weight | Snatch (kg) | | | | Clean & Jerk (kg) | | | | Total | Rank |
| Year | Venue | Weight | 1 | 2 | 3 | Rank | 1 | 2 | 3 | Rank | Total | Rank |
Olympic Games
| 2024 | Paris, France | 73 kg | 148 | ~~152~~ | ~~152~~ | —N/a | 190 | 194 | 198 JWR | —N/a | 346 | 2nd place, silver medalist(s) |
World Championships
| 2022 | Bogotá, Colombia | 67 kg | 143 | ~~147~~ | ~~147~~ | 3rd place, bronze medalist(s) | ~~175~~ | 175 | 180 | 3rd place, bronze medalist(s) | 323 | 3rd place, bronze medalist(s) |
| 2023 | Riyadh, Saudi Arabia | 73 kg | 145 | 150 | 154 | 2nd place, silver medalist(s) | ~~190~~ | 190 | 195 JWR | 1st place, gold medalist(s) | 349 | 1st place, gold medalist(s) |
| 2025 | Førde, Norway | 71 kg | 148 | 152 | ~~156~~ | 4 | ~~190~~ | 190 | 194 WR | 1st place, gold medalist(s) | 346 | 1st place, gold medalist(s) |
| 2026 | Ningbo, China | 75 kg | 155 | ~~159~~ | ~~159~~ | 7 | 197 | 200 | — | 3rd place, bronze medalist(s) | 355 | 3rd place, bronze medalist(s) |
IWF World Cup
| 2024 | Phuket, Thailand | 73 kg | 147 | ~~150~~ | ~~151~~ | 19 | ~~192~~ | ~~193~~ | ~~193~~ | — | — | — |
Asian Games
| 2023 | Hangzhou, China | 73 kg | 151 | 154 | 156 | —N/a | 190 | ~~195~~ | 195 | —N/a | 351 JWR | 2nd place, silver medalist(s) |
Asian Championships
| 2023 | Jinju, South Korea | 73 kg | 146 | 150 | ~~154~~ | 4 | 186 | 190 | 192 | 1st place, gold medalist(s) | 342 | 2nd place, silver medalist(s) |
