= 2023 World Weightlifting Championships – Men's 73 kg =

The men's 73 kilograms competition at the 2023 World Weightlifting Championships was held on 8 and 9 September 2023.

== Schedule ==
Date	Time	Event
8 September 2023	14:00	Group D
9 September 2023	11:30	Group C
9 September 2023	16:30	Group B
9 September 2023	19:00	Group A

== Medalists ==
Event	Gold		Silver		Bronze	
Snatch	Wei Yinting (CHN)	157 kg	Weeraphon Wichuma (THA)	154 kg	Ritvars Suharevs (LAT)	154 kg
Clean & Jerk	Weeraphon Wichuma (THA)	195 kg	Bak Joo-hyo (KOR)	187 kg	Muhammed Furkan Özbek (TUR)	187 kg
Total	Weeraphon Wichuma (THA)	349 kg	Wei Yinting (CHN)	337 kg	Muhammed Furkan Özbek (TUR)	334 kg

== Records ==
Prior to this competition, the existing world records were as follows.

World record	Snatch	Shi Zhiyong (CHN)	169 kg	Tashkent, Uzbekistan	20 April 2021
World record	Clean & jerk	Rahmat Erwin Abdullah (INA)	200 kg	Bogotá, Colombia	9 December 2022
World record	Total	Shi Zhiyong (CHN)	364 kg	Tokyo, Japan	28 July 2021

== Results ==
Rank	Athlete	Group	Snatch (kg)				Clean & Jerk (kg)				Total
Rank	Athlete	Group	1	2	3	Rank	1	2	3	Rank	Total
1st place, gold medalist(s)	Weeraphon Wichuma (THA)	C	145	150	154	2nd place, silver medalist(s)	~~190~~	190	195 JWR	1st place, gold medalist(s)	349
2nd place, silver medalist(s)	Wei Yinting (CHN)	A	~~155~~	~~155~~	157	1st place, gold medalist(s)	~~180~~	~~180~~	180	9	337
3rd place, bronze medalist(s)	Muhammed Furkan Özbek (TUR)	A	143	~~146~~	147	11	185	187	~~191~~	3rd place, bronze medalist(s)	334
4	Julio Mayora (VEN)	A	147	~~150~~	150	7	183	~~187~~	~~187~~	6	333
5	David Sánchez (ESP)	D	~~145~~	145	148	8	184	~~188~~	~~188~~	5	332
6	Karem Ben Hnia (TUN)	A	~~146~~	146	~~149~~	13	180	186	~~188~~	4	332
7	Tojonirina Andriantsitohaina (MAD)	D	146	151	153	4	178	~~182~~	~~182~~	11	331
8	Masanori Miyamoto (JPN)	A	~~147~~	147	~~151~~	10	178	183	~~188~~	7	330
9	Bak Joo-hyo (KOR)	A	~~143~~	143	~~147~~	17	180	187	~~192~~	2nd place, silver medalist(s)	330
10	Ryan Grimsland (USA)	B	140	145	~~148~~	14	181	~~188~~	~~188~~	8	326
11	Luis Javier Mosquera (COL)	B	145	~~150~~	150	6	~~175~~	~~175~~	175	14	325
12	Roberto Gutu (GER)	C	144	148	151	5	168	173	~~178~~	16	324
13	Bernardin Matam (FRA)	C	133	136	139	22	172	176	179	10	318
14	Samir Fardjallah (ALG)	B	140	146	~~148~~	12	~~171~~	171	~~176~~	19	317
15	Jorge Cárdenas (MEX)	C	140	~~145~~	~~145~~	19	170	175	~~180~~	13	315
16	Ajith Narayan (IND)	C	~~136~~	136	140	21	164	169	172	18	312
17	Ismail Jamali (ESP)	D	138	143	~~147~~	16	~~167~~	~~167~~	167	23	310
18	Edidiong Umoafia (NGR)	D	~~140~~	~~140~~	140	18	160	170	~~177~~	21	310
19	Caden Cahoy (USA)	C	133	137	~~141~~	23	~~173~~	~~173~~	173	17	310
20	Sergio Cares (CHI)	C	128	132	135	24	158	163	166	25	301
21	Abdulrahman Al-Beladi (KSA)	C	~~125~~	125	129	29	160	167	~~173~~	24	296
22	Jonathan Chin (GBR)	D	125	~~129~~	~~130~~	30	162	167	~~170~~	22	292
23	Ahsaan Shabi (LBA)	D	~~130~~	130	~~136~~	27	~~155~~	160	—	27	290
24	Jorge Hernández (HON)	D	120	125	~~131~~	31	155	~~161~~	161	26	286
25	Achinta Sheuli (IND)	D	~~130~~	~~130~~	130	28	150	155	~~160~~	29	285
26	Manuila Raobu (TUV)	D	120	~~125~~	125	32	145	150	~~155~~	30	275
27	Rafael Candeias (POR)	D	109	115	~~120~~	33	133	139	145	31	260
28	Zubair Nazari (AFG)	D	100	105	~~110~~	34	125	130	135	32	240
29	Geoffrey Otieno Oduor (KEN)	D	90	95	~~101~~	35	~~120~~	120	125	33	220
—	Mitsunori Konnai (JPN)	A	~~145~~	~~145~~	~~145~~	—	175	~~181~~	~~187~~	15	—
—	Ritvars Suharevs (LAT)	A	150	154	~~156~~	3rd place, bronze medalist(s)	~~178~~	~~178~~	~~181~~	—	—
—	Yusuf Fehmi Genç (TUR)	A	145	148	~~150~~	9	~~185~~	~~186~~	~~187~~	—	—
—	Suttipong Jeeram (THA)	A	145	~~150~~	~~151~~	15	~~180~~	~~180~~	~~180~~	—	—
—	Bektimur Reýimow (TKM)	B	~~143~~	~~145~~	~~145~~	—	~~170~~	~~170~~	171	20	—
—	Max Lang (GER)	B	~~145~~	~~146~~	~~146~~	—	~~176~~	176	—	12	—
—	Piotr Kudłaszyk (POL)	B	135	~~137~~	~~137~~	25	~~175~~	~~175~~	~~175~~	—	—
—	Julio Cedeño (DOM)	C	136	140	~~143~~	20	~~166~~	~~166~~	~~166~~	—	—
—	Nicolas Vachon (CAN)	C	133	~~137~~	~~137~~	26	~~172~~	~~172~~	~~172~~	—	—
—	Omar Javadov (AZE)	C	~~145~~	~~145~~	~~145~~	—	—	—	—	—	—
—	Indika Dissanayake (SRI)	D	~~130~~	~~130~~	~~130~~	—	155	~~160~~	~~161~~	28	—
—	Mirko Zanni (ITA)	A	—	—	—	—	—	—	—	—	—
—	Rizki Juniansyah (INA)	B	—	—	—	—	—	—	—	—	—
—	Jair Reyes (ECU)	B	—	—	—	—	—	—	—	—	—
—	Jon-Antohein Phillips (RSA)	D	Did not start								
