= Namkhaidorjiin Bayarmaa =

Mongolian weightlifter (born 1978)

Personal information
- Nationality: Mongolia
- Born: 1 June 1978 (age 48) Ulaanbaatar, Mongolia
- Height: 1.60 m (5 ft 3 in)
- Weight: 63 kg (139 lb)

Sport
- Sport: Weightlifting
- Event: 63 kg

Namkhaidorjiin Bayarmaa (Mongolian: Намхайдоржийн Баярмаа; born June 1, 1978, in Ulaanbaatar) is a Mongolian weightlifter. Bayarmaa made her official debut for the 2004 Summer Olympics in Athens, where she competed for the women's lightweight class (58 kg). She finished only in fourteenth place by five kilograms short of her record from Greece's Charikleia Kastritsi, with a total of 195.0 kg (87.5 in the snatch, and 187.5 in the clean and jerk).

At the 2008 Summer Olympics in Beijing, Bayarmaa switched to heavier class by competing in the women's 63 kg division. Bayarmaa placed tenth in this event, as she successfully lifted 90 kg in the single-motion snatch, and hoisted 123 kg in the two-part, shoulder-to-overhead clean and jerk, for a total of 213 kg.
