= Souad Dinar =

French weightlifter

Souade Dinar Doual (born August 16, 1977) is a French weightlifter in the 58 kg weight class.

In 1999, she finished 23rd at the World Championships in the 58 kg. She competed in the Women's 58 kg at the 2005 World Championships in Doha, Qatar and reached the 8th spot with 198 kg in total. At the 2006 World Championships she ranked 13th in the 58 kg category, with a total of 192 kg.

At the 2007 World Championships she ranked 14th in the 58 kg category, with a total of 194 kg. At the 2008 European Championships she ranked 4th in the 58 kg category, with a total of 192 kg.
