= Bernardin Matam =

French weightlifter (born 1990)

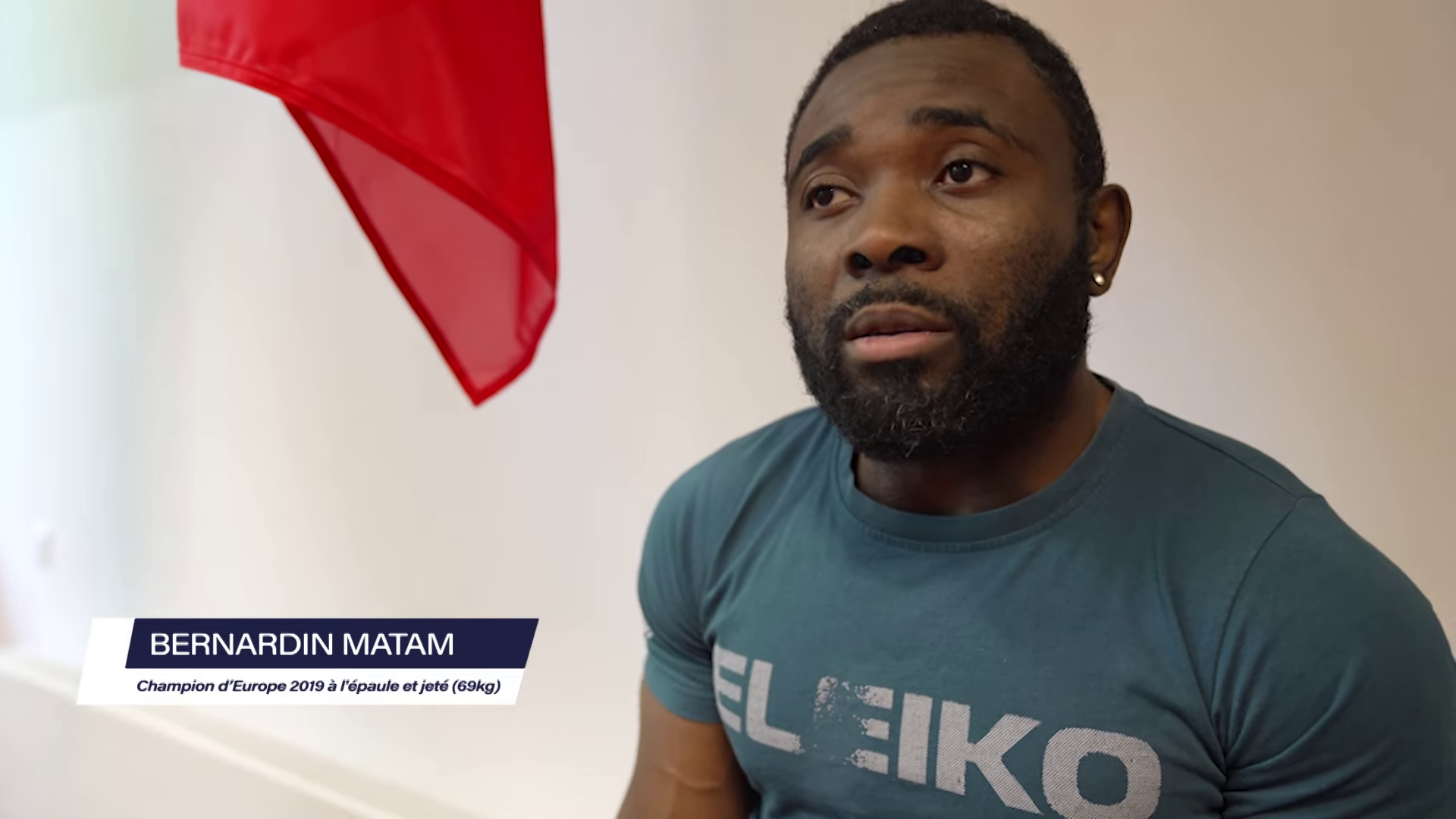

Personal information
- Full name: Bernardin Ledoux Kingue Matam
- National team: France
- Born: 20 May 1990 (age 36) Yaoundé, Cameroon
- Height: 1.63 m (5 ft 4 in)
- Weight: 69 kg (152 lb)

Sport
- Country: France
- Sport: Weightlifting
- Event: 69 kg
Medal record
Men's weightlifting
Representing France
World Championships
Bronze medal – third place	2017 Anaheim	–69 kg
European Championships
Gold medal – first place	2017 Split	–69 kg
Gold medal – first place	2019 Batumi	–67 kg
Bronze medal – third place	2012 Antalya	–69 kg
Bronze medal – third place	2013 Tirana	–69 kg
Bronze medal – third place	2015 Tbilisi	–69 kg
African Championships
Bronze medal – third place	2008 Strand	–69 kg

Bernardin Ledoux Kingue Matam (born 20 May 1990) is a Cameroonian-born weightlifter who competes in the men's lightweight division (-69 kg) for France.

== Career ==
He is part of the La Francaise de Besançon club in Besançon, France. His coach is Didier Boiston. He participated in the 2011 World Weightlifting Championships and came in seventh.

He represented France in the 2012 Olympics and 2016 Olympics. He also competed in the men's 67 kg event at the 2020 Summer Olympics in Tokyo, Japan.

In August 2024, Matam competed in the men's 73 kg event at the 2024 Summer Olympics held in Paris, France. He lifted 320 kg in total and placed ninth.

== Personal ==
Three of his brothers are also international weightlifters who competed at the Olympic Games. That are Alphonse Hercule Matam (1992), Samson N'Dicka-Matam (1996, 2000 and 2004) and David Matam (2004).

== Major results ==
Year	Venue	Weight	Snatch (kg)				Clean & Jerk (kg)				Total	Rank
Year	Venue	Weight	1	2	3	Rank	1	2	3	Rank	Total	Rank
Olympic Games
2012	London, Great Britain	69 kg	~~143~~	~~143~~	~~144~~	—N/a	—	—	—	—N/a	DNF	—
2016	Rio de Janeiro, Brazil	69 kg	140	~~144~~	~~144~~	—N/a	175	180	~~182~~	—N/a	320	7
2021	Tokyo, Japan	67 kg	132	135	~~138~~	—N/a	~~171~~	~~171~~	~~172~~	—N/a	DNF	—
2024	Paris, France	73 kg	138	142	145	—N/a	~~175~~	175	~~180~~	—N/a	320	9
World Championships
2011	Paris, France	69 kg	135	139	141	11	170	175	181	4	322	6
2013	Wrocław, Poland	69 kg	139	~~142~~	~~142~~	9	168	171	~~173~~	8	310	8
2014	Almaty, Kazakhstan	69 kg	~~136~~	142	~~145~~	10	173	177	~~182~~	6	319	7
2015	Houston, United States	69 kg	143	147	~~149~~	6	175	~~180~~	~~180~~	13	322	8
2017	Anaheim, United States	69 kg	141	~~143~~	~~143~~	6	175	177	~~181~~	3rd place, bronze medalist(s)	318	3rd place, bronze medalist(s)
2018	Ashgabat, Turkmenistan	67 kg	134	~~137~~	~~137~~	18	~~168~~	168	173	7	307	10
2019	Pattaya, Thailand	67 kg	135	~~138~~	138	15	170	173	175	7	313	9
2023	Riyadh, Saudi Arabia	73 kg	133	136	139	22	172	176	179	10	318	13
2026	Ningbo, China	65 kg	129	132	~~135~~	13	158	~~165~~	~~165~~	19	290	15
IWF World Cup
2024	Phuket, Thailand	61 kg	143	~~145~~	~~145~~	25	~~177~~	~~183~~	~~183~~	—	—	—
European Championships
2012	Antalya, Turkey	69 kg	139	145	145	2nd place, silver medalist(s)	~~173~~	173	~~177~~	4	318	3rd place, bronze medalist(s)
2013	Tirana, Albania	69 kg	~~138~~	138	143	4	~~168~~	168	~~174~~	4	311	3rd place, bronze medalist(s)
2015	Tbilisi, Georgia	69 kg	142	145	146	2nd place, silver medalist(s)	175	~~181~~	~~181~~	3rd place, bronze medalist(s)	321	3rd place, bronze medalist(s)
2016	Førde, Norway	69 kg	137	140	~~143~~	5	173	~~178~~	~~178~~	5	313	4
2017	Split, Croatia	69 kg	140	~~143~~	~~144~~	5	174	180	—	1st place, gold medalist(s)	320	1st place, gold medalist(s)
2019	Batumi, Georgia	67 kg	137	~~141~~	~~141~~	5	169	172	175	1st place, gold medalist(s)	312	1st place, gold medalist(s)
2021	Moscow, Russia	67 kg	133	136	138	8	~~170~~	170	~~174~~	5	308	6
2024	Sofia, Bulgaria	73 kg	138	142	~~145~~	13	177	~~182~~	182	4	324	8
2026	Batumi, Georgia	71 kg	129	~~132~~	~~132~~	10	162	~~165~~	~~165~~	10	291	11
African Championships
2008	Strand, South Africa	69 kg	129	~~135~~	135	3rd place, bronze medalist(s)	158	165	~~170~~	3rd place, bronze medalist(s)	300	3rd place, bronze medalist(s)
