= Saint-Médard-en-Jalles =

- Commune
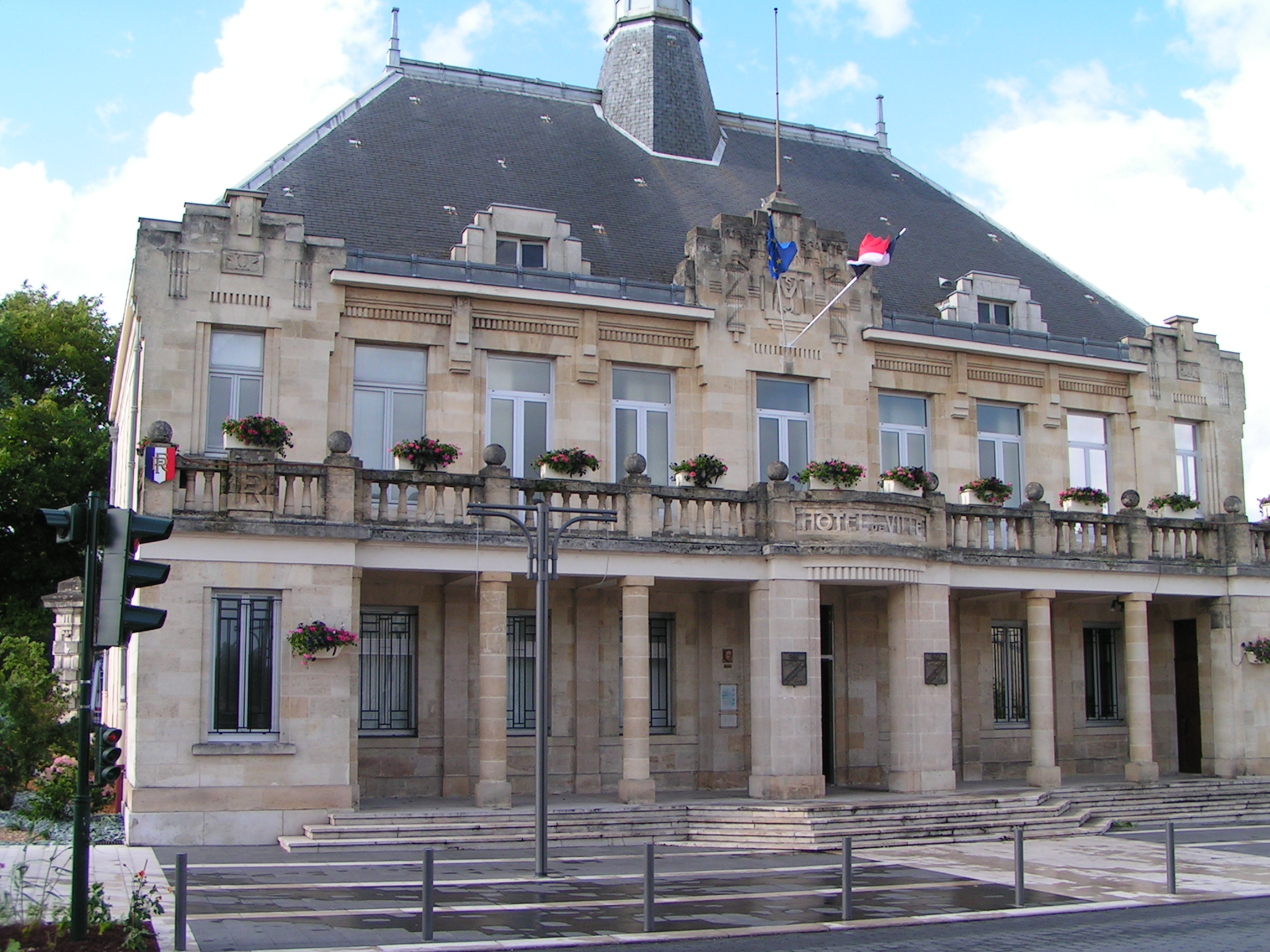
- The Hôtel de Ville

- Coat of arms
- Location of Saint-Médard-en-Jalles
- Location within France Location within Nouvelle-Aquitaine
- Coordinates: 44°53′47″N 0°42′59″W
- Country: France
- Region: Nouvelle-Aquitaine
- Department: Gironde
- Arrondissement: Bordeaux
- Canton: Saint-Médard-en-Jalles
- Intercommunality: Bordeaux Métropole

Government
  - Mayor (2020–2026): Stéphane Delpeyrat
- Area^{1}: 85.28 km^{2} (32.93 sq mi)
- Highest elevation: 48 m (157 ft)
- Lowest elevation: 9 m (30 ft)
- Population (2023): 32,910
  - Density: 385.9/km^{2} (999.5/sq mi)
- Time zone: UTC+01:00 (CET)
  - Summer (DST): UTC+02:00 (CEST)
- INSEE/Postal code: 33449 /33160
- ^{1} French Land Register data, which excludes lakes, ponds, glaciers > 1 km^{2} (0.386 sq mi or 247 acres) and river estuaries.

Saint-Médard-en-Jalles (French pronunciation: [sɛ̃ medaʁ ɑ̃ ʒal]; Occitan: Sent Medard de Jalas) is a commune in the Gironde department in Nouvelle-Aquitaine in southwestern France.

Located west-northwest of the city of Bordeaux, it is the fifth-largest suburb of the city and a member of the Bordeaux Métropole.

== History ==
The Hôtel de Ville was completed in 1936.

== Population ==
Historical population

Year	Pop.	±% p.a.
1793	1,599	—
1800	1,195	−4.08%
1806	1,277	+1.11%
1821	1,444	+0.82%
1831	1,667	+1.45%
1836	1,643	−0.29%
1841	1,822	+2.09%
1846	1,898	+0.82%
1851	1,988	+0.93%
1856	2,174	+1.80%
1861	2,315	+1.26%
1866	2,531	+1.80%
1872	2,613	+0.53%
1876	3,001	+3.52%
1881	3,272	+1.74%
1886	3,454	+1.09%
1891	3,925	+2.59%
1896	3,890	−0.18%
1901	4,407	+2.53%

Year	Pop.	±% p.a.
1906	4,884	+2.08%
1911	5,046	+0.65%
1921	5,277	+0.45%
1926	5,135	−0.54%
1931	5,105	−0.12%
1936	5,144	+0.15%
1946	6,037	+1.61%
1954	5,924	−0.24%
1962	6,967	+2.05%
1968	8,955	+4.27%
1975	16,265	+8.90%
1982	18,665	+1.99%
1990	22,064	+2.11%
1999	25,566	+1.65%
2007	27,243	+0.80%
2012	28,839	+1.15%
2017	31,145	+1.55%
2023	32,910	+0.92%

Source: EHESS and INSEE (1968-2023)

== See also ==
- Communes of the Gironde department
