= Alphonse Hercule Matam =

Cameroonian weightlifter

Personal information
- Nationality: Cameroonian
- Born: 1 April 1973 (age 51)

Sport
- Sport: Weightlifting

Alphonse Hercule Matam (born 1 April 1973) is a Cameroonian weightlifter. He competed in the men's light heavyweight event at the 1992 Summer Olympics.
