= Weightlifting at the 2026 Asian Games – Men's 60 kg =

Men's 60 kg at the 2026 Asian Games
- Venue: Nagoya Trade & Industry Center
- Date: 24 September 2026
- Competitors: 11 from 11 nations

Medalists
gold medal	Yang Yang	China
silver medal	Pang Un-chol	North Korea
bronze medal	Theerapong Silachai	Thailand

The men's 60 kilograms competition at the 2026 Asian Games was held on 24 September 2026 at the Nagoya Trade & Industry Center.

== Schedule ==
All times are Japan Standard Time (UTC+09:00)

Date	Time	Event
Thursday, 24 September 2026	10:00	Group B
Thursday, 24 September 2026	13:30	Group A

== Records ==
Prior to this competition, the existing world, Asian and Games records were as follows.

World Record	Snatch	World Standard	141 kg	—	1 June 2025
World Record	Clean & Jerk	Pang Un-chol (PRK)	174 kg	Gandhinagar, India	11 May 2026
World Record	Total	World Standard	307 kg	—	1 June 2025
Asian Record	Snatch	Asian Standard	141 kg	—	1 June 2025
Asian Record	Clean & Jerk	Pang Un-chol (PRK)	174 kg	Gandhinagar, India	11 May 2026
Asian Record	Total	Asian Standard	307 kg	—	1 June 2025
Games Record	Snatch	Asian Games Standard	138 kg	—	1 August 2026
Games Record	Clean & Jerk	Asian Games Standard	168 kg	—	1 August 2026
Games Record	Total	Asian Games Standard	303 kg	—	1 August 2026

== Results ==
Legend

- NM — No mark

Rank	Athlete	Group	Snatch (kg)				Clean & Jerk (kg)				Total
Rank	Athlete	Group	1	2	3	Result	1	2	3	Result	Total
1st place, gold medalist(s)	Yang Yang (CHN)	A	132	136	138	138	160	164	166	166	304
2nd place, silver medalist(s)	Pang Un-chol (PRK)	A	~~127~~	127	~~131~~	127	170	174	~~178~~	174	301
3rd place, bronze medalist(s)	Theerapong Silachai (THA)	A	~~126~~	~~126~~	126	126	165	173	~~176~~	173	299
4	Ricko Saputra (INA)	A	~~128~~	130	~~134~~	130	161	165	168	168	298
5	Otepbergen Aliyev (KAZ)	A	122	~~126~~	127	127	153	~~158~~	~~161~~	153	280
6	K'Dương (VIE)	A	125	~~129~~	~~129~~	125	~~155~~	155	~~162~~	155	280
7	Aqeel Al-Jasim (KSA)	A	~~124~~	124	127	127	~~150~~	150	~~156~~	150	277
8	Toukir Hasan (BAN)	B	100	104	~~107~~	104	120	~~128~~	128	128	232
9	Gan-Erdeniin Uuganbaatar (MGL)	B	87	92	96	96	101	105	~~110~~	105	201
—	Supun Somathilaka (SRI)	B	~~105~~	106	~~111~~	106	~~135~~	~~135~~	~~135~~	—	NM
—	Eleaphraime Limmong (PHI)	A	~~120~~	~~120~~	~~120~~	—	—	—	—	—	NM

== New records ==
The following records were established during the competition.

Clean & Jerk	170	Pang Un-chol (PRK)	GR
Clean & Jerk	173	Theerapong Silachai (THA)	GR
Clean & Jerk	174	Pang Un-chol (PRK)	GR
Total	304	Yang Yang (CHN)	GR
