= 2010 World Weightlifting Championships – Men's 62 kg =

The men's competition in the featherweight (under 62 kg) division was held on 18 and 19 September 2010.

== Schedule ==
Date	Time	Event
18 September 2010	08:00	Group D
19 September 2010	08:00	Group C
19 September 2010	11:30	Group B
19 September 2010	18:00	Group A

== Medalists ==
Event	Gold		Silver		Bronze	
Snatch	Kim Un-guk (PRK)	147 kg	Erol Bilgin (TUR)	143 kg	Ding Jianjun (CHN)	142 kg
Clean & Jerk	Zhang Jie (CHN)	174 kg	Kim Un-guk (PRK)	173 kg	Eko Yuli Irawan (INA)	172 kg
Total	Kim Un-guk (PRK)	320 kg	Zhang Jie (CHN)	315 kg	Erol Bilgin (TUR)	314 kg

== Records ==
Prior to this competition, the existing world records were as follows.

World Record	Snatch	Shi Zhiyong (CHN)	153 kg	İzmir, Turkey	28 June 2002
World Record	Clean & Jerk	Le Maosheng (CHN)	182 kg	Busan, South Korea	2 October 2002
World Record	Total	Zhang Jie (CHN)	326 kg	Kanazawa, Japan	28 April 2008

== Results ==
Rank	Athlete	Group	Body weight	Snatch (kg)				Clean & Jerk (kg)				Total
Rank	Athlete	Group	Body weight	1	2	3	Rank	1	2	3	Rank	Total
1st place, gold medalist(s)	Kim Un-guk (PRK)	A	61.51	140	145	147	1st place, gold medalist(s)	170	~~173~~	173	2nd place, silver medalist(s)	320
2nd place, silver medalist(s)	Zhang Jie (CHN)	A	61.90	141	~~146~~	~~146~~	4	171	174	~~180~~	1st place, gold medalist(s)	315
3rd place, bronze medalist(s)	Erol Bilgin (TUR)	A	61.64	138	~~143~~	143	2nd place, silver medalist(s)	166	~~171~~	171	5	314
4	Eko Yuli Irawan (INA)	A	61.64	135	140	~~143~~	5	166	171	172	3rd place, bronze medalist(s)	312
5	Ji Hun-min (KOR)	A	61.74	~~137~~	137	~~143~~	6	158	167	172	4	309
6	Ding Jianjun (CHN)	A	61.97	138	142	~~146~~	3rd place, bronze medalist(s)	160	—	—	10	302
7	Ümürbek Bazarbaýew (TKM)	A	61.70	~~133~~	133	~~140~~	7	155	160	165	6	298
8	Muhammad Hasbi (INA)	B	61.22	123	128	131	8	153	158	161	7	292
9	Withawat Kritphet (THA)	B	61.75	125	129	~~132~~	9	155	161	~~164~~	8	290
10	Diego Salazar (COL)	A	61.50	~~128~~	128	~~132~~	11	160	~~165~~	~~165~~	9	288
11	Ruslan Alpanov (UZB)	B	61.90	124	127	129	10	153	157	~~162~~	11	286
12	Masakazu Ioroi (JPN)	B	61.60	122	125	127	12	146	151	154	13	281
13	Damian Wiśniewski (POL)	B	61.96	120	125	127	13	146	151	~~154~~	15	278
14	Ahmed Saad (EGY)	B	61.91	~~121~~	~~121~~	122	16	151	~~156~~	~~156~~	14	273
15	Meretguly Sähetmyradow (TKM)	B	61.85	121	125	~~128~~	14	~~145~~	145	~~150~~	19	270
16	Iurie Dudoglo (MDA)	C	61.67	117	121	~~125~~	17	140	145	~~148~~	17	266
17	Namechand Sunil Kumar (IND)	D	61.13	118	~~122~~	122	15	~~143~~	~~143~~	143	21	265
18	Pongsak Maneetong (THA)	B	61.98	115	~~120~~	~~120~~	23	150	~~155~~	~~155~~	16	265
19	Kévin Caesemaeker (FRA)	C	61.61	~~117~~	~~117~~	117	19	140	144	~~149~~	20	261
20	Alex Lee (USA)	C	61.83	110	115	~~118~~	21	145	~~153~~	~~153~~	18	260
21	Yann Aucouturier (FRA)	C	61.57	~~117~~	117	~~120~~	18	138	~~142~~	~~142~~	26	255
22	Yosuke Nakayama (JPN)	C	61.71	113	~~117~~	~~117~~	24	137	~~142~~	142	23	255
23	Iván García (ESP)	D	61.88	110	115	~~118~~	22	135	140	~~143~~	24	255
24	Jasvir Singh (CAN)	D	61.84	~~107~~	107	~~112~~	29	143	~~148~~	~~148~~	22	250
25	Gerasimos Melas (GRE)	D	61.96	100	105	107	30	135	140	~~145~~	25	247
26	Acorán Hernández (ESP)	C	61.79	111	~~116~~	~~116~~	25	132	~~137~~	~~137~~	30	243
27	Massimiliano Rubino (ITA)	C	61.38	108	~~114~~	~~114~~	27	~~133~~	133	—	28	241
28	Petr Petrov (CZE)	D	61.42	105	109	~~112~~	26	132	~~137~~	~~137~~	29	241
29	Alphonso Adonis (RSA)	D	61.00	~~100~~	100	~~106~~	32	130	135	137	27	237
30	Zied Gugannouni (TUN)	D	61.68	100	~~106~~	107	28	~~130~~	130	~~136~~	31	237
31	Wayne Healy (IRL)	D	61.77	~~101~~	101	104	31	~~125~~	125	~~128~~	32	229
—	Marius Gîscan (ROU)	D	61.95	116	~~120~~	~~120~~	20	~~160~~	~~160~~	~~161~~	—	—
—	Bünyamin Sezer (TUR)	A	61.59	~~138~~	~~138~~	~~138~~	—	~~150~~	150	155	12	—
—	Nizom Sangov (TJK)	D	61.77	105	110	~~114~~	—	125	~~130~~	130	—	—
—	Mohammed Al-Hubail (KSA)	D	61.13	110	115	118	—	~~140~~	~~140~~	~~141~~	—	—
—	Sfah Hafid (IRQ)	C	61.16	~~110~~	~~110~~	~~110~~	—	~~130~~	~~130~~	~~130~~	—	—
