= 2011 World Weightlifting Championships – Men's 62 kg =

The men's competition in the bantamweight (– 62 kg) division was held on 5 and 6 November 2011.

== Schedule ==
| Date | Time | Event |
|---|---|---|
| 5 November 2011 | 22:00 | Group D |
| 6 November 2011 | 10:30 | Group C |
| 6 November 2011 | 14:30 | Group B |
| 6 November 2011 | 20:00 | Group A |

== Medalists ==
| Event | Gold | | Silver | | Bronze | |
|---|---|---|---|---|---|---|
| Snatch | Kim Un-guk (PRK) | 150 kg | Zhang Jie (CHN) | 145 kg | Bünyamin Sezer (TUR) | 141 kg |
| Clean & Jerk | Zhang Jie (CHN) | 176 kg | Eko Yuli Irawan (INA) | 171 kg | Kim Un-guk (PRK) | 170 kg |
| Total | Zhang Jie (CHN) | 321 kg | Kim Un-guk (PRK) | 320 kg | Eko Yuli Irawan (INA) | 310 kg |

== Records ==
Prior to this competition, the existing world records were as follows.

| World Record | Snatch | Shi Zhiyong (CHN) | 153 kg | İzmir, Turkey | 28 June 2002 |
| World Record | Clean & Jerk | Le Maosheng (CHN) | 182 kg | Busan, South Korea | 2 October 2002 |
| World Record | Total | Zhang Jie (CHN) | 326 kg | Kanazawa, Japan | 28 April 2008 |

== Results ==
| Rank | Athlete | Group | Body weight | Snatch (kg) | | | | Clean & Jerk (kg) | | | | Total |
| Rank | Athlete | Group | Body weight | 1 | 2 | 3 | Rank | 1 | 2 | 3 | Rank | Total |
|---|---|---|---|---|---|---|---|---|---|---|---|---|
| 1st place, gold medalist(s) | Zhang Jie (CHN) | A | 61.90 | 140 | 145 | ~~147~~ | 2nd place, silver medalist(s) | 172 | ~~176~~ | 176 | 1st place, gold medalist(s) | 321 |
| 2nd place, silver medalist(s) | Kim Un-guk (PRK) | A | 61.87 | 140 | 145 | 150 | 1st place, gold medalist(s) | 161 | 170 | ~~175~~ | 3rd place, bronze medalist(s) | 320 |
| 3rd place, bronze medalist(s) | Eko Yuli Irawan (INA) | A | 61.98 | 135 | ~~139~~ | 139 | 4 | 165 | 171 | ~~173~~ | 2nd place, silver medalist(s) | 310 |
| 4 | Óscar Figueroa (COL) | A | 61.91 | 135 | 138 | ~~140~~ | 6 | ~~170~~ | 170 | ~~175~~ | 4 | 308 |
| 5 | Ümürbek Bazarbaýew (TKM) | A | 61.90 | ~~134~~ | ~~134~~ | 135 | 8 | 160 | 168 | ~~173~~ | 5 | 303 |
| 6 | Cha Kum-chol (PRK) | A | 61.34 | ~~133~~ | 133 | 138 | 5 | 155 | 160 | ~~162~~ | 10 | 298 |
| 7 | Ji Hun-min (KOR) | A | 61.80 | 132 | ~~136~~ | 136 | 7 | ~~161~~ | 161 | ~~170~~ | 9 | 297 |
| 8 | Diego Salazar (COL) | A | 61.74 | 127 | 131 | ~~133~~ | 9 | ~~157~~ | 157 | 163 | 6 | 294 |
| 9 | Bünyamin Sezer (TUR) | A | 61.99 | 133 | 140 | 141 | 3rd place, bronze medalist(s) | 153 | ~~157~~ | ~~160~~ | 15 | 294 |
| 10 | Hurşit Atak (TUR) | A | 61.93 | 127 | ~~133~~ | ~~134~~ | 12 | 163 | ~~172~~ | ~~175~~ | 7 | 290 |
| 11 | Muhammad Hasbi (INA) | B | 61.91 | ~~125~~ | 125 | ~~132~~ | 13 | 150 | ~~160~~ | 162 | 8 | 287 |
| 12 | Jesús López (VEN) | B | 61.97 | 120 | ~~125~~ | 125 | 14 | 151 | 156 | ~~160~~ | 14 | 281 |
| 13 | Daniýar Ysmaýylow (TKM) | B | 61.68 | ~~127~~ | ~~127~~ | 127 | 10 | 145 | ~~15~~1 | 151 | 18 | 278 |
| 14 | Manuel Minginfel (FSM) | C | 61.77 | 112 | 117 | 122 | 18 | 151 | 156 | ~~160~~ | 12 | 278 |
| 15 | Ghenadie Dudoglo (MDA) | B | 61.86 | 123 | 127 | ~~130~~ | 11 | 145 | 150 | ~~153~~ | 22 | 277 |
| 16 | Masakazu Ioroi (JPN) | B | 61.68 | ~~123~~ | 123 | ~~126~~ | 15 | 147 | 150 | 152 | 16 | 275 |
| 17 | Withawat Kritphet (THA) | B | 61.76 | ~~122~~ | 122 | ~~126~~ | 17 | 152 | ~~157~~ | ~~157~~ | 17 | 274 |
| 18 | Marius Gîscan (ROU) | B | 61.98 | ~~111~~ | 111 | 115 | 29 | 155 | 159 | ~~161~~ | 11 | 274 |
| 19 | Iurie Dudoglo (MDA) | B | 61.79 | ~~123~~ | 123 | ~~126~~ | 16 | ~~150~~ | ~~150~~ | 150 | 21 | 273 |
| 20 | Pongpisut Napoom (THA) | B | 61.85 | ~~116~~ | ~~116~~ | 116 | 24 | 150 | ~~156~~ | 156 | 13 | 272 |
| 21 | Yoichi Itokazu (JPN) | C | 61.65 | 116 | 119 | 121 | 19 | 150 | ~~152~~ | ~~152~~ | 20 | 271 |
| 22 | Aricco Jumitih (MAS) | C | 61.64 | 115 | 119 | ~~121~~ | 22 | 145 | 150 | ~~157~~ | 19 | 269 |
| 23 | Ruslan Alpanov (UZB) | B | 61.80 | 120 | ~~124~~ | ~~125~~ | 21 | 145 | ~~152~~ | ~~152~~ | 27 | 265 |
| 24 | Kévin Caesemaeker (FRA) | C | 61.89 | 116 | 119 | 121 | 20 | 140 | 144 | ~~147~~ | 28 | 265 |
| 25 | Rustam Sarang (IND) | C | 61.96 | ~~115~~ | 115 | ~~120~~ | 28 | 144 | 149 | ~~152~~ | 23 | 264 |
| 26 | Arthouros Akritidis (GRE) | C | 61.21 | 110 | 115 | ~~117~~ | 25 | 145 | ~~150~~ | ~~150~~ | 24 | 260 |
| 27 | Karem Ben Hnia (TUN) | C | 61.50 | 115 | ~~120~~ | ~~120~~ | 26 | 145 | ~~150~~ | ~~150~~ | 26 | 260 |
| 28 | Acorán Hernández (ESP) | D | 61.73 | 111 | 116 | 118 | 23 | 135 | 140 | ~~144~~ | 30 | 258 |
| 29 | Daniel Koum (AUS) | C | 61.41 | 112 | ~~115~~ | ~~117~~ | 31 | 140 | ~~145~~ | 145 | 25 | 257 |
| 30 | Iván García (ESP) | D | 61.62 | 110 | 115 | ~~118~~ | 27 | 135 | 140 | ~~144~~ | 29 | 255 |
| 31 | Calogero Guarnaccia (ITA) | C | 61.50 | 113 | ~~116~~ | ~~116~~ | 30 | 135 | ~~140~~ | ~~140~~ | 32 | 248 |
| 32 | Vaipava Nevo Ioane (ASA) | D | 61.59 | 100 | 105 | 110 | 32 | 130 | 135 | ~~140~~ | 33 | 245 |
| 33 | Michal Beláň (SVK) | D | 61.72 | ~~107~~ | 107 | ~~112~~ | 34 | 133 | 137 | ~~140~~ | 31 | 244 |
| 34 | Tuau Lapua Lapua (TUV) | D | 61.88 | 100 | 105 | 110 | 33 | 125 | 130 | ~~135~~ | 34 | 240 |
| 35 | Stevick Patris (PLW) | D | 61.68 | 100 | ~~105~~ | ~~105~~ | 35 | 125 | — | — | 35 | 225 |
| DQ | Nizom Sangov (TJK) | D | 61.99 | 110 | ~~115~~ | ~~115~~ | — | 130 | ~~135~~ | 135 | — | — |
