= Weightlifting at the 2010 Asian Games – Men's 62 kg =

Men's 62 kg at the 2010 Asian Games
- Venue: Dongguan Arena
- Date: 14 November 2010
- Competitors: 16 from 12 nations

Medalists
gold medal	Zhang Jie	China
silver medal	Kim Un-guk	North Korea
bronze medal	Eko Yuli Irawan	Indonesia

The men's 62 kilograms event at the 2010 Asian Games took place on 14 November 2010 at Dongguan Arena.

== Schedule ==
All times are China Standard Time (UTC+08:00)

Date	Time	Event
Sunday, 14 November 2010	12:30	Group B
Sunday, 14 November 2010	16:30	Group A

== Records ==
Prior to this competition, the existing world, Asian and Games records were as follows.

World Record	Snatch	Shi Zhiyong (CHN)	153 kg	İzmir, Turkey	28 June 2002
World Record	Clean & Jerk	Le Maosheng (CHN)	182 kg	Busan, South Korea	2 October 2002
World Record	Total	Zhang Jie (CHN)	326 kg	Kanazawa, Japan	28 April 2008
Asian Record	Snatch	Shi Zhiyong (CHN)	153 kg	İzmir, Turkey	28 June 2002
Asian Record	Clean & Jerk	Le Maosheng (CHN)	182 kg	Busan, South Korea	2 October 2002
Asian Record	Total	Zhang Jie (CHN)	326 kg	Kanazawa, Japan	28 April 2008
Games Record	Snatch	Qiu Le (CHN)	142 kg	Doha, Qatar	3 December 2006
Games Record	Clean & Jerk	Le Maosheng (CHN)	182 kg	Busan, South Korea	2 October 2002
Games Record	Total	Le Maosheng (CHN)	322 kg	Busan, South Korea	2 October 2002

== Results ==
Legend

- NM — No mark

Rank	Athlete	Group	Body weight	Snatch (kg)				Clean & Jerk (kg)				Total
Rank	Athlete	Group	Body weight	1	2	3	Result	1	2	3	Result	Total
1st place, gold medalist(s)	Zhang Jie (CHN)	A	61.79	140	~~145~~	145	145	172	176	~~182~~	176	321
2nd place, silver medalist(s)	Kim Un-guk (PRK)	A	61.86	140	145	147	147	170	~~175~~	~~175~~	170	317
3rd place, bronze medalist(s)	Eko Yuli Irawan (INA)	A	61.98	137	141	~~144~~	141	~~170~~	170	~~177~~	170	311
4	Ji Hun-min (KOR)	A	61.66	~~135~~	135	140	140	162	169	~~171~~	169	309
5	Yang Sheng-hsiung (TPE)	A	61.44	129	~~134~~	134	134	~~168~~	168	~~171~~	168	302
6	Ümürbek Bazarbaýew (TKM)	A	61.87	126	132	~~136~~	132	150	155	~~163~~	155	287
7	Sultan Omurzhan Uulu (KGZ)	A	61.43	122	~~126~~	126	126	150	~~154~~	~~154~~	150	276
8	Meretguly Sähetmyradow (TKM)	B	61.87	117	~~121~~	~~123~~	117	140	145	148	148	265
9	Rustam Sarang (IND)	B	61.83	112	117	~~120~~	117	142	147	~~150~~	147	264
10	Bekzat Osmonaliev (KGZ)	B	60.24	116	121	~~124~~	121	135	~~142~~	142	142	263
11	Omkar Otari (IND)	B	61.85	115	120	~~124~~	120	135	140	~~145~~	140	260
12	Thawatchai Phonchiangsa (THA)	B	61.43	~~105~~	105	~~110~~	105	135	140	~~145~~	140	245
13	Nizom Sangov (TJK)	B	61.75	~~110~~	~~110~~	110	110	125	~~130~~	~~130~~	125	235
—	Withawat Kritphet (THA)	A	61.86	~~125~~	~~125~~	~~125~~	—	—	—	—	—	NM
—	Ruslan Alpanov (UZB)	B	61.86	~~123~~	~~123~~	~~124~~	—	—	—	—	—	NM
—	Indika Dissanayake (SRI)	B	61.89	~~112~~	~~112~~	~~112~~	—	—	—	—	—	NM

== New records ==
The following records were established during the competition.

Snatch	145	Kim Un-guk (PRK)	GR
Snatch	147	Kim Un-guk (PRK)	GR
