= 2009 World Weightlifting Championships – Men's 62 kg =

The men's competition in the featherweight (– 62 kg) division was staged on November 21, 2009.

== Schedule ==
| Date | Time | Event |
|---|---|---|
| 20 November 2009 | 13:00 | Group C |
| 21 November 2009 | 11:00 | Group B |
| 21 November 2009 | 16:00 | Group A |

== Medalists ==
| Event | Gold | | Silver | | Bronze | |
|---|---|---|---|---|---|---|
| Snatch | Ding Jianjun (CHN) | 146 kg | Yang Fan (CHN) | 144 kg | Eko Yuli Irawan (INA) | 140 kg |
| Clean & Jerk | Eko Yuli Irawan (INA) | 175 kg | Yang Sheng-hsiung (TPE) | 170 kg | Yang Fan (CHN) | 170 kg |
| Total | Ding Jianjun (CHN) | 316 kg | Eko Yuli Irawan (INA) | 315 kg | Yang Fan (CHN) | 314 kg |

== Records ==
Prior to this competition, the existing world records were as follows.

| World Record | Snatch | Shi Zhiyong (CHN) | 153 kg | İzmir, Turkey | 28 June 2002 |
| World Record | Clean & Jerk | Le Maosheng (CHN) | 182 kg | Busan, South Korea | 2 October 2002 |
| World Record | Total | Zhang Jie (CHN) | 326 kg | Kanazawa, Japan | 28 April 2008 |

== Results ==
| Rank | Athlete | Group | Body weight | Snatch (kg) | | | | Clean & Jerk (kg) | | | | Total |
| Rank | Athlete | Group | Body weight | 1 | 2 | 3 | Rank | 1 | 2 | 3 | Rank | Total |
|---|---|---|---|---|---|---|---|---|---|---|---|---|
| 1st place, gold medalist(s) | Ding Jianjun (CHN) | A | 61.85 | 138 | 143 | 146 | 1st place, gold medalist(s) | 170 | ~~175~~ | ~~175~~ | 4 | 316 |
| 2nd place, silver medalist(s) | Eko Yuli Irawan (INA) | A | 61.68 | 135 | 140 | ~~143~~ | 3rd place, bronze medalist(s) | 166 | 171 | 175 | 1st place, gold medalist(s) | 315 |
| 3rd place, bronze medalist(s) | Yang Fan (CHN) | A | 61.65 | 140 | 144 | ~~146~~ | 2nd place, silver medalist(s) | 170 | ~~175~~ | ~~175~~ | 3rd place, bronze medalist(s) | 314 |
| 4 | Óscar Figueroa (COL) | A | 61.72 | 135 | 139 | ~~141~~ | 4 | ~~165~~ | 165 | 168 | 5 | 307 |
| 5 | Yang Sheng-hsiung (TPE) | B | 61.44 | ~~130~~ | ~~130~~ | 130 | 13 | ~~162~~ | 162 | 170 | 2nd place, silver medalist(s) | 300 |
| 6 | Zulfugar Suleymanov (AZE) | A | 61.83 | ~~128~~ | 128 | 133 | 10 | 165 | ~~172~~ | ~~172~~ | 6 | 298 |
| 7 | Lázaro Ruiz (CUB) | A | 60.48 | 130 | ~~134~~ | 135 | 7 | 161 | ~~166~~ | ~~166~~ | 8 | 296 |
| 8 | Sajjad Behrouzi (IRI) | A | 61.64 | 135 | ~~138~~ | ~~141~~ | 8 | 161 | ~~166~~ | ~~171~~ | 9 | 296 |
| 9 | Diego Salazar (COL) | A | 61.73 | 132 | ~~137~~ | ~~137~~ | 11 | ~~162~~ | ~~162~~ | 162 | 7 | 294 |
| 10 | Ji Hun-min (KOR) | A | 61.60 | ~~137~~ | 137 | ~~141~~ | 6 | 155 | ~~165~~ | ~~165~~ | 10 | 292 |
| 11 | Erol Bilgin (TUR) | A | 61.93 | ~~133~~ | 135 | ~~140~~ | 9 | 155 | ~~160~~ | — | 11 | 290 |
| 12 | Mohamed Ehab (EGY) | B | 61.68 | ~~125~~ | ~~126~~ | 126 | 15 | ~~154~~ | 154 | ~~160~~ | 13 | 280 |
| 13 | Masakazu Ioroi (JPN) | B | 61.59 | ~~125~~ | 125 | ~~130~~ | 16 | 150 | 154 | ~~156~~ | 12 | 279 |
| 14 | Bünyamin Sezer (TUR) | B | 61.90 | 125 | 131 | ~~134~~ | 12 | 140 | ~~147~~ | 147 | 20 | 278 |
| 15 | Tom Goegebuer (BEL) | B | 61.75 | 122 | ~~126~~ | ~~126~~ | 20 | 145 | 149 | 151 | 14 | 273 |
| 16 | Damian Wiśniewski (POL) | B | 61.66 | 120 | 125 | 127 | 14 | 145 | ~~151~~ | ~~151~~ | 21 | 272 |
| 17 | Ruslan Alpanov (UZB) | B | 61.78 | 123 | ~~126~~ | ~~126~~ | 18 | 145 | 149 | ~~152~~ | 17 | 272 |
| 18 | Dimitris Minasidis (CYP) | B | 62.00 | 125 | ~~128~~ | ~~128~~ | 17 | 145 | ~~150~~ | ~~150~~ | 23 | 270 |
| 19 | Meretguly Sähetmyradow (TKM) | B | 61.99 | 117 | 121 | ~~124~~ | 21 | ~~144~~ | ~~144~~ | 144 | 24 | 265 |
| 20 | Kévin Caesemaeker (FRA) | B | 61.69 | 110 | 117 | 120 | 22 | 142 | ~~147~~ | ~~147~~ | 25 | 262 |
| 21 | Jasvir Singh (CAN) | C | 61.78 | 108 | 112 | ~~115~~ | 27 | 145 | 150 | ~~152~~ | 15 | 262 |
| 22 | Daniel Koum (AUS) | C | 61.75 | ~~113~~ | ~~113~~ | 113 | 26 | 144 | 147 | ~~150~~ | 19 | 260 |
| 23 | Petr Slabý (CZE) | C | 61.82 | 107 | ~~111~~ | 111 | 28 | 140 | 144 | 149 | 18 | 260 |
| 24 | Ivis Araujo (MEX) | C | 61.99 | 110 | 115 | ~~117~~ | 25 | ~~140~~ | 140 | 145 | 22 | 260 |
| 25 | Iván García (ESP) | C | 61.78 | 112 | ~~117~~ | 117 | 23 | 135 | 140 | 142 | 26 | 259 |
| 26 | Acorán Hernández (ESP) | C | 61.80 | 115 | 120 | 123 | 19 | ~~135~~ | 135 | ~~141~~ | 28 | 258 |
| 27 | Simon Ngamba (CMR) | C | 61.85 | 115 | ~~119~~ | ~~119~~ | 24 | ~~135~~ | 135 | ~~140~~ | 29 | 250 |
| 28 | Aaron Adams (USA) | C | 61.48 | 104 | 107 | ~~109~~ | 29 | 140 | ~~143~~ | ~~143~~ | 27 | 247 |
| — | Ümürbek Bazarbaýew (TKM) | A | 61.98 | 133 | ~~137~~ | 138 | 5 | ~~155~~ | ~~155~~ | ~~155~~ | — | — |
| — | Katsuhiko Uechi (JPN) | B | 61.82 | ~~122~~ | ~~122~~ | ~~122~~ | — | ~~150~~ | ~~150~~ | 150 | 16 | — |
