= Weightlifting at the 2014 Asian Games – Men's 62 kg =

Asian Games

Men's 62 kg at the 2014 Asian Games
- Venue: Moonlight Festival Garden Venue
- Date: 21 September 2014
- Competitors: 17 from 12 nations

Medalists
gold medal	Kim Un-guk	North Korea
silver medal	Chen Lijun	China
bronze medal	Eko Yuli Irawan	Indonesia

The men's 62 kilograms event at the 2014 Asian Games took place on 21 September 2014 at Moonlight Festival Garden Weightlifting Venue.

== Schedule ==
All times are Korea Standard Time (UTC+09:00)

Date	Time	Event
Sunday, 21 September 2014	14:00	Group B
Sunday, 21 September 2014	19:00	Group A

== Records ==
Prior to this competition, the existing world, Asian and Games records were as follows.

World Record	Snatch	Shi Zhiyong (CHN)	153 kg	İzmir, Turkey	28 June 2002
World Record	Clean & Jerk	Le Maosheng (CHN)	182 kg	Busan, South Korea	2 October 2002
World Record	Total	Kim Un-guk (PRK)	327 kg	London, United Kingdom	30 July 2012
Asian Record	Snatch	Shi Zhiyong (CHN)	153 kg	İzmir, Turkey	28 June 2002
Asian Record	Clean & Jerk	Le Maosheng (CHN)	182 kg	Busan, South Korea	2 October 2002
Asian Record	Total	Kim Un-guk (PRK)	327 kg	London, United Kingdom	30 July 2012
Games Record	Snatch	Kim Un-guk (PRK)	147 kg	Guangzhou, China	14 November 2010
Games Record	Clean & Jerk	Le Maosheng (CHN)	182 kg	Busan, South Korea	2 October 2002
Games Record	Total	Le Maosheng (CHN)	322 kg	Busan, South Korea	2 October 2002

== Results ==
Legend

- NM — No mark

Rank	Athlete	Group	Body weight	Snatch (kg)				Clean & Jerk (kg)				Total
Rank	Athlete	Group	Body weight	1	2	3	Result	1	2	3	Result	Total
1st place, gold medalist(s)	Kim Un-guk (PRK)	A	61.81	147	152	154	154	170	174	178	178	332
2nd place, silver medalist(s)	Chen Lijun (CHN)	A	61.87	140	143	~~145~~	143	~~173~~	173	178	178	321
3rd place, bronze medalist(s)	Eko Yuli Irawan (INA)	A	61.68	138	142	~~145~~	142	166	~~174~~	~~174~~	166	308
4	Ümürbek Bazarbaýew (TKM)	A	61.80	~~133~~	133	137	137	160	164	~~167~~	164	301
5	Han Myeong-mok (KOR)	A	61.93	138	~~142~~	143	143	157	~~166~~	~~166~~	157	300
6	Muhammad Hasbi (INA)	A	61.62	127	133	~~137~~	133	160	165	~~172~~	165	298
7	Yoichi Itokazu (JPN)	A	61.80	~~125~~	125	~~128~~	125	157	161	~~168~~	161	286
8	Thawatchai Phonchiangsa (THA)	A	61.77	120	125	127	127	151	155	~~159~~	155	282
9	Azamat Rymkulov (KAZ)	A	61.78	121	~~126~~	126	126	141	150	~~154~~	150	276
10	Katsuhiko Uechi (JPN)	B	61.71	116	120	~~123~~	120	145	150	155	155	275
11	Omarguly Handurdyýew (TKM)	A	61.79	115	120	~~124~~	120	145	152	~~156~~	152	272
12	Abdullatif Al-Abdullatif (KSA)	B	61.65	115	119	~~122~~	119	140	147	152	152	271
13	Bekzat Osmonaliev (KGZ)	B	61.91	110	116	121	121	135	145	150	150	271
14	Mahmoud Al-Humayd (KSA)	B	61.69	114	118	~~121~~	118	139	~~144~~	~~147~~	139	257
15	Bikash Thapa (NEP)	B	61.85	~~105~~	~~105~~	105	105	~~123~~	123	~~126~~	123	228
16	Mohammad Abu Jame (JOR)	B	61.42	87	92	~~98~~	92	~~120~~	120	~~128~~	120	212
—	Jong Kwang-jin (PRK)	A	61.81	121	~~125~~	~~125~~	121	~~160~~	~~160~~	~~160~~	—	NM

== New records ==
The following records were established during the competition.

Snatch	152	Kim Un-guk (PRK)	GR
Snatch	154	Kim Un-guk (PRK)	WR
Total	324	Kim Un-guk (PRK)	GR
Total	328	Kim Un-guk (PRK)	WR
Total	332	Kim Un-guk (PRK)	WR
