= 2014 World Weightlifting Championships – Men's 62 kg =

The men's 62 kilograms event at the 2014 World Weightlifting Championships was held on 8 and 9 November 2014 in Baluan Sholak Sports Palace, Almaty, Kazakhstan.

== Schedule ==
Date	Time	Event
8 November 2014	09:00	Group D
8 November 2014	13:00	Group C
9 November 2014	13:00	Group B
9 November 2014	19:00	Group A

== Medalists ==
Event	Gold		Silver		Bronze	
Snatch	Kim Un-guk (PRK)	150 kg	Ding Jianjun (CHN)	142 kg	Luis Javier Mosquera (COL)	141 kg
Clean & Jerk	Kim Un-guk (PRK)	175 kg	Eko Yuli Irawan (INA)	175 kg	Muhammad Hasbi (INA)	171 kg
Total	Kim Un-guk (PRK)	325 kg	Eko Yuli Irawan (INA)	316 kg	Ding Jianjun (CHN)	312 kg

== Records ==
Prior to this competition, the existing world records were as follows.

World Record	Snatch	Kim Un-guk (PRK)	154 kg	Incheon, South Korea	21 September 2014
World Record	Clean & Jerk	Le Maosheng (CHN)	182 kg	Busan, South Korea	2 October 2002
World Record	Total	Kim Un-guk (PRK)	332 kg	Incheon, South Korea	21 September 2014

== Results ==
Rank	Athlete	Group	Body weight	Snatch (kg)				Clean & Jerk (kg)				Total
Rank	Athlete	Group	Body weight	1	2	3	Rank	1	2	3	Rank	Total
1st place, gold medalist(s)	Kim Un-guk (PRK)	A	61.79	145	~~150~~	150	1st place, gold medalist(s)	170	174	175	1st place, gold medalist(s)	325
2nd place, silver medalist(s)	Eko Yuli Irawan (INA)	A	61.92	~~136~~	136	141	4	165	~~171~~	175	2nd place, silver medalist(s)	316
3rd place, bronze medalist(s)	Ding Jianjun (CHN)	A	61.62	~~140~~	140	142	2nd place, silver medalist(s)	165	170	~~173~~	5	312
4	Luis Javier Mosquera (COL)	A	61.42	136	140	141	3rd place, bronze medalist(s)	165	170	~~174~~	4	311
5	Muhammad Hasbi (INA)	A	61.76	130	~~135~~	~~135~~	7	160	168	171	3rd place, bronze medalist(s)	301
7	Vladimir Urumov (BUL)	A	61.49	130	133	~~135~~	5	152	~~157~~	157	7	290
8	Ahmed Saad (EGY)	B	61.85	~~122~~	122	126	8	~~153~~	153	156	8	282
9	Ion Țărnă (MDA)	B	61.44	120	~~125~~	~~125~~	15	150	155	160	6	280
10	Thawatchai Phonchiangsa (THA)	B	61.44	~~123~~	123	~~125~~	10	151	~~154~~	154	9	277
11	Abdullatif Al-Abdullatif (KSA)	B	61.22	119	~~122~~	~~122~~	19	149	~~153~~	153	11	272
12	Gergely Soóky (HUN)	B	61.64	113	~~118~~	118	22	150	154	~~160~~	10	272
13	Michael Di Giusto (ITA)	C	61.85	113	117	120	17	147	152	~~157~~	12	272
14	Derrick Johnson (USA)	C	62.00	~~118~~	118	122	13	145	150	~~155~~	14	272
15	Florin Croitoru (ROU)	B	61.91	120	124	126	9	140	145	~~147~~	19	271
16	Mahmoud Al-Humayd (KSA)	C	61.87	118	~~121~~	~~122~~	24	140	147	150	13	268
17	Rustam Imanzade (AZE)	C	60.99	115	120	~~122~~	14	143	147	~~152~~	15	267
18	Ghenadie Dudoglo (MDA)	B	61.60	123	~~127~~	~~127~~	12	143	~~147~~	~~148~~	21	266
19	Kao Chan-hung (TPE)	D	61.95	115	~~120~~	120	18	135	140	145	20	265
20	Ramini Shamilishvili (GEO)	C	61.66	115	118	~~120~~	23	140	143	146	16	264
21	Daniel Vizitiu (ROU)	B	61.75	120	~~125~~	~~125~~	16	143	~~147~~	~~147~~	22	263
22	Emrah Aydın (TUR)	C	61.60	115	~~120~~	~~120~~	26	~~145~~	145	~~150~~	18	260
23	Souhail Mairif (ALG)	C	61.98	110	116	~~120~~	25	~~140~~	140	~~145~~	27	256
24	Iván García (ESP)	D	61.60	100	115	~~118~~	27	135	140	~~145~~	25	255
25	Rustam Sarang (IND)	D	61.78	110	115	~~117~~	28	140	~~145~~	~~146~~	26	255
26	Pongsakorn Nondara (THA)	D	61.50	107	110	112	31	138	140	~~143~~	24	252
27	Adkhamjon Ergashev (UZB)	D	61.95	108	111	114	30	~~127~~	~~127~~	127	30	241
28	Charles Ssekyaaya (UGA)	D	61.49	95	~~100~~	100	32	125	130	~~135~~	29	230
—	Yoichi Itokazu (JPN)	B	61.78	127	130	132	6	~~160~~	~~160~~	~~160~~	—	—
—	Arthouros Akritidis (GRE)	B	61.55	117	123	~~125~~	11	~~152~~	~~152~~	~~153~~	—	—
—	Bekzat Osmonaliev (KGZ)	B	61.32	~~117~~	119	~~124~~	20	~~143~~	~~143~~	~~143~~	—	—
—	Enkhjargalyn Mönkhdöl (MGL)	D	61.84	~~119~~	~~119~~	119	21	~~147~~	~~147~~	~~147~~	—	—
—	Jesús López (VEN)	D	61.95	110	115	—	29	~~146~~	~~146~~	~~146~~	—	—
—	Gareth Evans (GBR)	D	61.78	~~118~~	~~118~~	~~118~~	—	146	~~151~~	~~151~~	17	—
—	Yosuke Nakayama (JPN)	C	61.76	~~122~~	~~122~~	~~122~~	—	142	~~146~~	~~146~~	23	—
—	Emanuel Lushi (ALB)	D	61.65	~~113~~	~~113~~	~~113~~	—	130	135	~~141~~	28	—
—	Óscar Figueroa (COL)	A	61.80	~~135~~	~~135~~	~~135~~	—	—	—	—	—	—
—	Bünyamin Sezer (TUR)	A	61.93	~~135~~	~~135~~	~~135~~	—	—	—	—	—	—
—	Ivaylo Filev (BUL)	A	61.60	~~135~~	~~135~~	~~135~~	—	~~162~~	—	—	—	—
DQ	Stanislau Chadovich (BLR)	A	61.66	131	135	137	—	151	156	159	—	—
