= 2012 Asian Weightlifting Championships =

International weightlifting competition

2012 Asian Championships
- Host city: Pyeongtaek, South Korea
- Dates: 24–30 April
- Main venue: Yichung Culture & Sports Center

The 2012 Asian Weightlifting Championships was held at Yichung Culture & Sports Center in Pyeongtaek, South Korea between April 24 and April 30, 2012. It was the 43rd men's and 24th women's championship.

== Medal summary ==
=== Men ===
Event	Gold		Silver		Bronze	
56 kg
Snatch	Li Fabin; China	126 kg	Trần Lê Quốc Toàn; Vietnam	126 kg	Thạch Kim Tuấn; Vietnam	124 kg
Clean & Jerk	Ji Guohua; China	154 kg	Jadi Setiadi; Indonesia	153 kg	Li Fabin; China	153 kg
Total	Li Fabin; China	279 kg	Trần Lê Quốc Toàn; Vietnam	279 kg	Jadi Setiadi; Indonesia	276 kg
62 kg
Snatch	Chen Hongqing; China	135 kg	Ümürbek Bazarbaýew; Turkmenistan	133 kg	Muhammad Hasbi; Indonesia	131 kg
Clean & Jerk	Chen Hongqing; China	169 kg	Muhammad Hasbi; Indonesia	166 kg	Ji Hun-min; South Korea	164 kg
Total	Chen Hongqing; China	304 kg	Muhammad Hasbi; Indonesia	297 kg	Ji Hun-min; South Korea	295 kg
69 kg
Snatch	Sajjad Behrouzi; Iran	148 kg	Won Jeong-sik; South Korea	144 kg	Shi Zhiyong; China	144 kg
Clean & Jerk	Shi Zhiyong; China	180 kg	Liu Weihuang; China	180 kg	Morteza Rezaeian; Iran	177 kg
Total	Shi Zhiyong; China	324 kg	Liu Weihuang; China	324 kg	Sajjad Behrouzi; Iran	323 kg
77 kg
Snatch	Nursultan Rakhatov; Kazakhstan	153 kg	Ulugbek Alimov; Uzbekistan	145 kg	Aman Meredow; Turkmenistan	144 kg
Clean & Jerk	Ulugbek Alimov; Uzbekistan	190 kg	Nursultan Rakhatov; Kazakhstan	182 kg	Ekkachai Yeeram; Thailand	176 kg
Total	Ulugbek Alimov; Uzbekistan	335 kg	Nursultan Rakhatov; Kazakhstan	335 kg	Aman Meredow; Turkmenistan	314 kg
85 kg
Snatch	Kianoush Rostami; Iran	172 kg	Sohrab Moradi; Iran	172 kg	Sa Jae-hyouk; South Korea	167 kg
Clean & Jerk	Sohrab Moradi; Iran	216 kg	Kianoush Rostami; Iran	211 kg	Sa Jae-hyouk; South Korea	203 kg
Total	Sohrab Moradi; Iran	388 kg	Kianoush Rostami; Iran	383 kg	Sa Jae-hyouk; South Korea	370 kg
94 kg
Snatch	He Shuyong; China	175 kg	Kim Min-jae; South Korea	175 kg	Suthiphon Watthanakasikam; Thailand	170 kg
Clean & Jerk	Kim Min-jae; South Korea	211 kg	He Shuyong; China	210 kg	Ali Jadid; Syria	197 kg
Total	Kim Min-jae; South Korea	386 kg	He Shuyong; China	385 kg	Igor Vashanov; Kazakhstan	366 kg
105 kg
Snatch	Navab Nassirshalal; Iran	187 kg	Ruslan Nurudinov; Uzbekistan	184 kg	Hsieh Wei-chun; Chinese Taipei	163 kg
Clean & Jerk	Ruslan Nurudinov; Uzbekistan	220 kg	Kim Chul-min; South Korea	209 kg	Giyosiddin Ahmedov; Uzbekistan	203 kg
Total	Ruslan Nurudinov; Uzbekistan	404 kg	Giyosiddin Ahmedov; Uzbekistan	362 kg	Hsieh Wei-chun; Chinese Taipei	358 kg
+105 kg
Snatch	Behdad Salimi; Iran	206 kg	Jeon Sang-guen; South Korea	200 kg	Sajjad Anoushiravani; Iran	193 kg
Clean & Jerk	Behdad Salimi; Iran	245 kg	Sajjad Anoushiravani; Iran	238 kg	Jeon Sang-guen; South Korea	237 kg
Total	Behdad Salimi; Iran	451 kg	Jeon Sang-guen; South Korea	437 kg	Sajjad Anoushiravani; Iran	431 kg

=== Women ===
Event	Gold		Silver		Bronze	
48 kg
Snatch	Huang Yuezhen; China	92 kg	Mahliyo Togoeva; Uzbekistan	76 kg	Ngangbam Soniya Chanu; India	75 kg
Clean & Jerk	Huang Yuezhen; China	108 kg	Panida Khamsri; Thailand	104 kg	Marina Sisoeva; Uzbekistan	103 kg
Total	Huang Yuezhen; China	200 kg	Marina Sisoeva; Uzbekistan	178 kg	Mahliyo Togoeva; Uzbekistan	177 kg
53 kg
Snatch	Hsu Shu-ching; Chinese Taipei	97 kg	Li Qimei; China	93 kg	Yu Weili; Hong Kong	91 kg
Clean & Jerk	Hsu Shu-ching; Chinese Taipei	123 kg	Prapawadee Jaroenrattanatarakoon; Thailand	116 kg	Li Qimei; China	115 kg
Total	Hsu Shu-ching; Chinese Taipei	220 kg	Li Qimei; China	208 kg	Yu Weili; Hong Kong	201 kg
58 kg
Snatch	Pimsiri Sirikaew; Thailand	100 kg	Kuo Hsing-chun; Chinese Taipei	98 kg	Zhou Jun; China	95 kg
Clean & Jerk	Pimsiri Sirikaew; Thailand	131 kg	Kuo Hsing-chun; Chinese Taipei	130 kg	Zhou Jun; China	125 kg
Total	Pimsiri Sirikaew; Thailand	231 kg	Kuo Hsing-chun; Chinese Taipei	228 kg	Zhou Jun; China	220 kg
63 kg
Snatch	Deng Mengrong; China	108 kg	Zhou Wenyu; China	108 kg	Kim Soo-kyung; South Korea	103 kg
Clean & Jerk	Deng Mengrong; China	136 kg	Zhou Wenyu; China	136 kg	Rattikan Gulnoi; Thailand	130 kg
Total	Deng Mengrong; China	244 kg	Zhou Wenyu; China	244 kg	Rattikan Gulnoi; Thailand	226 kg
69 kg
Snatch	Huang Shih-hsu; Chinese Taipei	117 kg	Li Juan; China	105 kg	Anastassiya Shvabauer; Kazakhstan	103 kg
Clean & Jerk	Huang Shih-hsu; Chinese Taipei	135 kg	Li Juan; China	134 kg	Wang Ya-jhen; Chinese Taipei	133 kg
Total	Huang Shih-hsu; Chinese Taipei	250 kg	Li Juan; China	239 kg	Wang Ya-jhen; Chinese Taipei	236 kg
75 kg
Snatch	Lan Huixian; China	104 kg	Lim Ji-hye; South Korea	104 kg	Gulnaz Nauryzova; Kazakhstan	94 kg
Clean & Jerk	Lan Huixian; China	131 kg	Lim Ji-hye; South Korea	131 kg	Gulnaz Nauryzova; Kazakhstan	114 kg
Total	Lan Huixian; China	235 kg	Lim Ji-hye; South Korea	235 kg	Gulnaz Nauryzova; Kazakhstan	208 kg
+75 kg
Snatch	Jang Mi-ran; South Korea	125 kg	Praeonapa Khenjantuek; Thailand	115 kg	Alexandra Aborneva; Kazakhstan	110 kg
Clean & Jerk	Jang Mi-ran; South Korea	165 kg	Alexandra Aborneva; Kazakhstan	141 kg	Praeonapa Khenjantuek; Thailand	136 kg
Total	Jang Mi-ran; South Korea	290 kg	Alexandra Aborneva; Kazakhstan	251 kg	Praeonapa Khenjantuek; Thailand	251 kg

== Medal table ==
Ranking by Big (Total result) medals

Rank	Nation	Gold	Silver	Bronze	Total
1	China	6	5	1	12
2	South Korea	2	2	2	6
3	Uzbekistan	2	2	1	5
4	Chinese Taipei	2	1	2	5
4	Iran	2	1	2	5
6	Thailand	1	0	2	3
7	Kazakhstan	0	2	2	4
8	Indonesia	0	1	1	2
9	Vietnam	0	1	0	1
10	Hong Kong	0	0	1	1
10	Turkmenistan	0	0	1	1
Totals (11 entries)		15	15	15	45

Ranking by all medals: Big (Total result) and Small (Snatch and Clean & Jerk)

Rank	Nation	Gold	Silver	Bronze	Total
1	China	18	12	6	36
2	Iran	8	4	4	16
3	Chinese Taipei	6	3	4	13
4	South Korea	5	8	7	20
5	Uzbekistan	4	5	3	12
6	Thailand	3	3	6	12
7	Kazakhstan	1	4	6	11
8	Indonesia	0	3	2	5
9	Vietnam	0	2	1	3
10	Turkmenistan	0	1	2	3
11	Hong Kong	0	0	2	2
12	India	0	0	1	1
12	Syria	0	0	1	1
Totals (13 entries)		45	45	45	135

== Team ranking ==
=== Men ===
Rank	Team	Points
1	Iran	501
2	South Korea	500
3	Kazakhstan	441
4	Japan	432
5	China	420
6	Thailand	415

=== Women ===
Rank	Team	Points
1	China	544
2	Kazakhstan	432
3	South Korea	417
4	Chinese Taipei	416
5	Vietnam	391
6	Uzbekistan	356

== Participating nations ==
239 athletes from 28 nations competed.

- China (13)
- Chinese Taipei (14)
- Hong Kong (1)
- India (15)
- Indonesia (10)
- Iran (8)
- Iraq (8)
- Japan (8)
- Kazakhstan (15)
- Kuwait (3)
- Kyrgyzstan (9)
- Macau (2)
- Malaysia (13)
- Mongolia (14)
- Oman (2)
- Pakistan (1)
- Philippines (2)
- Qatar (4)
- Saudi Arabia (8)
- South Korea (15)
- Sri Lanka (1)
- Syria (9)
- Tajikistan (1)
- Thailand (13)
- Turkmenistan (12)
- United Arab Emirates (12)
- Uzbekistan (13)
- Vietnam (13)

== Men's results ==
=== 56 kg ===
Rank	Athlete	Group	Snatch (kg)				Clean & Jerk (kg)				Total
Rank	Athlete	Group	1	2	3	Rank	1	2	3	Rank	Total
1st place, gold medalist(s)	Li Fabin (CHN)	A	121	125	126	1st place, gold medalist(s)	150	153	~~155~~	3rd place, bronze medalist(s)	279
2nd place, silver medalist(s)	Trần Lê Quốc Toàn (VIE)	A	121	124	126	2nd place, silver medalist(s)	150	153	~~155~~	4	279
3rd place, bronze medalist(s)	Jadi Setiadi (INA)	A	117	~~121~~	123	4	147	~~151~~	153	2nd place, silver medalist(s)	276
4	Thạch Kim Tuấn (VIE)	A	122	124	~~126~~	3rd place, bronze medalist(s)	145	~~150~~	~~150~~	6	269
5	Yang Chin-yi (TPE)	A	~~116~~	116	~~120~~	5	~~146~~	~~146~~	146	5	262
6	Go Suk-kyo (KOR)	A	112	~~118~~	~~118~~	7	~~140~~	140	~~145~~	8	252
7	Sumar Riyanto (INA)	A	110	~~115~~	~~115~~	8	135	~~140~~	~~140~~	10	245
8	Mansour Al-Saleem (KSA)	B	105	110	113	6	124	130	~~135~~	12	243
9	Tan Chi-chung (TPE)	B	~~102~~	102	107	10	135	~~140~~	~~140~~	9	242
10	Ranjit Chinchwade (IND)	B	~~105~~	105	~~109~~	11	~~135~~	135	~~139~~	11	240
11	Yasir Al-Hamadani (IRQ)	B	97	~~101~~	~~101~~	12	123	129	~~131~~	13	226
12	Muhamad Tramizi Abdullah (MAS)	B	~~90~~	~~90~~	90	13	~~120~~	120	~~125~~	14	210
13	Bayarbat Sürenjav (MGL)	B	~~80~~	80	~~86~~	14	105	~~110~~	~~111~~	15	185
14	Gan-Erdene Tsoggerel (MGL)	B	~~75~~	75	80	15	~~90~~	90	~~95~~	16	170
—	Suhail Al-Kulaibi (OMA)	A	110	~~114~~	~~117~~	9	~~130~~	~~130~~	~~130~~	—	—
—	Ji Guohua (CHN)	A	~~122~~	~~122~~	~~122~~	—	151	154	~~160~~	1st place, gold medalist(s)	—
—	Nestor Colonia (PHI)	B	~~112~~	~~112~~	~~113~~	—	135	140	145	7	—

=== 62 kg ===
Rank	Athlete	Group	Snatch (kg)				Clean & Jerk (kg)				Total
Rank	Athlete	Group	1	2	3	Rank	1	2	3	Rank	Total
1st place, gold medalist(s)	Chen Hongqing (CHN)	A	132	135	~~137~~	1st place, gold medalist(s)	165	169	~~172~~	1st place, gold medalist(s)	304
2nd place, silver medalist(s)	Muhammad Hasbi (INA)	A	~~130~~	131	~~135~~	3rd place, bronze medalist(s)	160	166	~~170~~	2nd place, silver medalist(s)	297
3rd place, bronze medalist(s)	Ji Hun-min (KOR)	A	~~131~~	131	~~135~~	4	160	164	~~168~~	3rd place, bronze medalist(s)	295
4	Ümürbek Bazarbaýew (TKM)	A	125	~~130~~	133	2nd place, silver medalist(s)	151	~~160~~	~~162~~	5	284
5	Yoichi Itokazu (JPN)	A	120	124	127	6	155	~~162~~	~~163~~	4	282
6	Bekzat Osmonaliev (KGZ)	A	120	126	~~131~~	7	150	~~156~~	~~156~~	6	276
7	Yerbolat Zholamanov (KAZ)	B	112	117	~~120~~	9	145	150	~~156~~	7	267
8	Mohammed Ridha Ali (IRQ)	A	120	125	~~130~~	8	140	~~151~~	~~151~~	11	265
9	Ruslan Makarov (UZB)	B	~~110~~	114	~~117~~	11	140	145	148	8	262
10	Rustam Sarang (IND)	B	112	~~116~~	116	10	140	145	~~148~~	9	261
11	Abdullatif Khadher Al-Abdullatif (KSA)	B	107	112	114	12	137	145	~~148~~	10	259
12	Omarguly Handurdyev (TKM)	B	105	~~110~~	110	13	130	137	~~141~~	12	247
13	Mohammed Al-Khalidi (IRQ)	B	95	105	107	14	~~120~~	120	129	13	236
14	Mukhdul Enkhjargal (MGL)	B	105	~~111~~	~~111~~	15	125	~~129~~	~~129~~	14	230
15	Mohamed Faizal Baharom (MAS)	B	~~105~~	105	~~110~~	16	125	~~130~~	~~130~~	15	230
—	Majid Askari (IRN)	A	123	127	~~130~~	5	~~161~~	~~161~~	~~162~~	—	—
