= Weightlifting at the 2018 Asian Games – Men's 62 kg =

Event at the 2018 Asian Games

Men's 62 kg at the 2018 Asian Games
- Venue: Jakarta International Expo
- Date: 21 August 2018
- Competitors: 15 from 12 nations

Medalists
gold medal	Eko Yuli Irawan	Indonesia
silver medal	Trịnh Văn Vinh	Vietnam
bronze medal	Adkhamjon Ergashev	Uzbekistan

The Men's 62 kilograms event at the 2018 Asian Games took place on 21 August 2018 at the Jakarta International Expo Hall A.

== Schedule ==
All times are Western Indonesia Time (UTC+07:00)

Date	Time	Event
Tuesday, 21 August 2018	11:00	Group B
Tuesday, 21 August 2018	14:00	Group A

== Records ==
Prior to this competition, the existing world, Asian and Games records were as follows.

World Record	Snatch	Kim Un-guk (PRK)	154 kg	Incheon, South Korea	21 September 2014
World Record	Clean & Jerk	Chen Lijun (CHN)	183 kg	Houston, United States	22 November 2015
World Record	Total	Chen Lijun (CHN)	333 kg	Houston, United States	22 November 2015
Asian Record	Snatch	Kim Un-guk (PRK)	154 kg	Incheon, South Korea	21 September 2014
Asian Record	Clean & Jerk	Chen Lijun (CHN)	183 kg	Houston, United States	22 November 2015
Asian Record	Total	Chen Lijun (CHN)	333 kg	Houston, United States	22 November 2015
Games Record	Snatch	Kim Un-guk (PRK)	154 kg	Incheon, South Korea	21 September 2014
Games Record	Clean & Jerk	Le Maosheng (CHN)	182 kg	Busan, South Korea	2 October 2002
Games Record	Total	Kim Un-guk (PRK)	332 kg	Incheon, South Korea	21 September 2014

== Results ==
Legend

- NM — No mark

Rank	Athlete	Group	Snatch (kg)				Clean & Jerk (kg)				Total
Rank	Athlete	Group	1	2	3	Result	1	2	3	Result	Total
1st place, gold medalist(s)	Eko Yuli Irawan (INA)	A	137	141	~~145~~	141	165	170	~~175~~	170	311
2nd place, silver medalist(s)	Trịnh Văn Vinh (VIE)	A	129	133	~~136~~	133	162	166	~~179~~	166	299
3rd place, bronze medalist(s)	Adkhamjon Ergashev (UZB)	A	128	133	136	136	158	162	~~165~~	162	298
4	Sin Chol-bom (PRK)	A	~~130~~	130	~~133~~	130	~~168~~	168	~~170~~	168	298
5	Yoichi Itokazu (JPN)	A	125	130	~~133~~	130	152	158	~~162~~	158	288
6	Đinh Xuân Hoàng (VIE)	A	125	~~128~~	129	129	~~153~~	153	159	159	288
7	Talha Talib (PAK)	B	127	131	133	133	148	152	154	154	287
8	Muhammad Purkon (INA)	A	125	130	~~134~~	130	152	~~156~~	~~156~~	152	282
9	Kao Chan-hung (TPE)	A	~~126~~	126	~~129~~	126	~~153~~	154	~~157~~	154	280
10	Hiroaki Takao (JPN)	B	122	~~125~~	125	125	~~152~~	~~152~~	152	152	277
11	Patiphan Bupphamala (THA)	B	115	120	~~125~~	120	140	~~145~~	~~145~~	140	260
12	Enkhjargalyn Mönkhdöl (MGL)	B	112	~~120~~	~~120~~	112	139	~~147~~	~~151~~	139	251
13	Gilton da Costa (TLS)	B	70	80	~~87~~	80	85	90	~~105~~	90	170
—	Thilanka Palangasinghe (SRI)	B	~~122~~	~~122~~	~~125~~	—	—	—	—	—	NM
—	Nawaf Al-Mazyadi (KSA)	B	~~115~~	~~115~~	~~115~~	—	—	—	—	—	NM
