= Eko Yuli Irawan =

Indonesian weightlifter (born 1989)

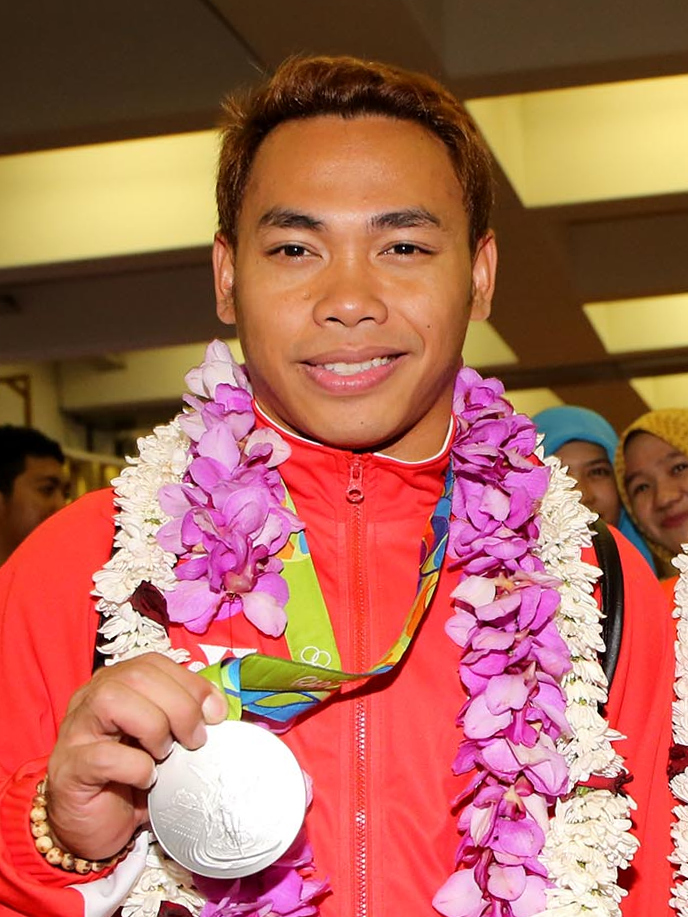
- Irawan after the 2016 Summer Olympics

Personal information
- Nationality: Indonesian
- Born: 24 July 1989 (age 37) Metro, Lampung, Indonesia
- Education: Sports science State University of Jakarta
- Height: 1.60 m (5 ft 3 in)
- Weight: 60.95 kg (134 lb)
- Spouse: Masitah (m. 2010)

Sport
- Country: Indonesia
- Sport: Weightlifting
- Event: 61 kg
- Coached by: Aveenash Pandoo
Medal record
Men's weightlifting
Representing Indonesia
Olympic Games
Silver medal – second place	2016 Rio de Janeiro	62 kg
Silver medal – second place	2020 Tokyo	61 kg
Bronze medal – third place	2008 Beijing	56 kg
Bronze medal – third place	2012 London	62 kg
World Championships
Gold medal – first place	2018 Ashgabat	61 kg
Silver medal – second place	2009 Goyang	62 kg
Silver medal – second place	2014 Almaty	62 kg
Silver medal – second place	2019 Pattaya	61 kg
Silver medal – second place	2022 Bogotá	61 kg
Silver medal – second place	2023 Riyadh	67 kg
Bronze medal – third place	2007 Chiang Mai	56 kg
Bronze medal – third place	2011 Paris	62 kg
IWF World Cup
Gold medal – first place	2019 Fuzhou	61 kg
IWF Grand Prix
Gold medal – first place	2023 Havana	67 kg
Silver medal – second place	2011 Fujian	62 kg
Silver medal – second place	2015 Fuzhou	62 kg
Asian Games
Gold medal – first place	2018 Jakarta–Palembang	62 kg
Bronze medal – third place	2010 Guangzhou	62 kg
Bronze medal – third place	2014 Incheon	62 kg
Asian Championships
Silver medal – second place	2008 Kanazawa	62 kg
Bronze medal – third place	2019 Ningbo	61 kg
Summer Universiade
Gold medal – first place	2011 Shenzhen	62 kg
Islamic Solidarity Games
Gold medal – first place	2013 Palembang	62 kg
Gold medal – first place	2017 Baku	62 kg
SEA Games
Gold medal – first place	2007 Nakhon Ratchasima	56 kg
Gold medal – first place	2009 Vientiane	62 kg
Gold medal – first place	2011 Jakarta–Palembang	62 kg
Gold medal – first place	2013 Naypyidaw	62 kg
Gold medal – first place	2019 Philippines	61 kg
Gold medal – first place	2021 Vietnam	61 kg
Gold medal – first place	2023 Cambodia	61 kg
Silver medal – second place	2017 Kuala Lumpur	62 kg
Bronze medal – third place	2025 Thailand	65 kg
International Fajr Cup
Gold medal – first place	2020 Tehran	67 kg
Junior World Championships
Gold medal – first place	2007 Prague	56 kg
Gold medal – first place	2009 Bucharest	62 kg
Silver medal – second place	2006 Hangzhou	56 kg

Eko Yuli Irawan (born 24 July 1989) is an Indonesian weightlifter who competes in the 61 kg and 62 kg category.

Irawan has won four medals at the Summer Olympics, eight medals at world championships, and three medals at the Asian Games, including a gold in 2018.

Irawan is the most decorated Indonesian athlete at the Olympics with two silver and two bronze medals. He is also Indonesia's first athlete to compete in five consecutive Olympic Games. After he qualified for the Paris 2024 Olympics he became the Indonesian athlete with the most appearances at the Olympics.

== Career ==
Irawan's father worked as a paddle rickshaw driver, while his mother sold vegetables. Irawan took up weightlifting in 2000.

At the 2006 Junior World Championships he won the silver medal in the 56 kg category, lifting 269 kg in total. At the 2007 Junior World Championships he won the gold medal in the 56 kg category, lifting 273 kg in total.

Irawan ranked eighth at the 2006 World Championships in the 56 kg category. At the 2007 World Championships he won the bronze medal in the 56 kg category, lifting 278 kg in total.

Irawan won gold medals at the 2007 SEA Games and 2018 Asian Games.

At the 2008 Asian Championships he won the silver medal in the 62 kg category, lifting 305 kg in total.

Irawan won the bronze medal in the 56 kg category at the 2008 Summer Olympics in Beijing, lifting 288 kg in total. He won the silver medal in the 62 kg category at the 2009 World Weightlifting Championships, with 315 kg in total. At the 2011 World Championships he won the bronze medal in the 62 kg category, lifting 310 kg in total.

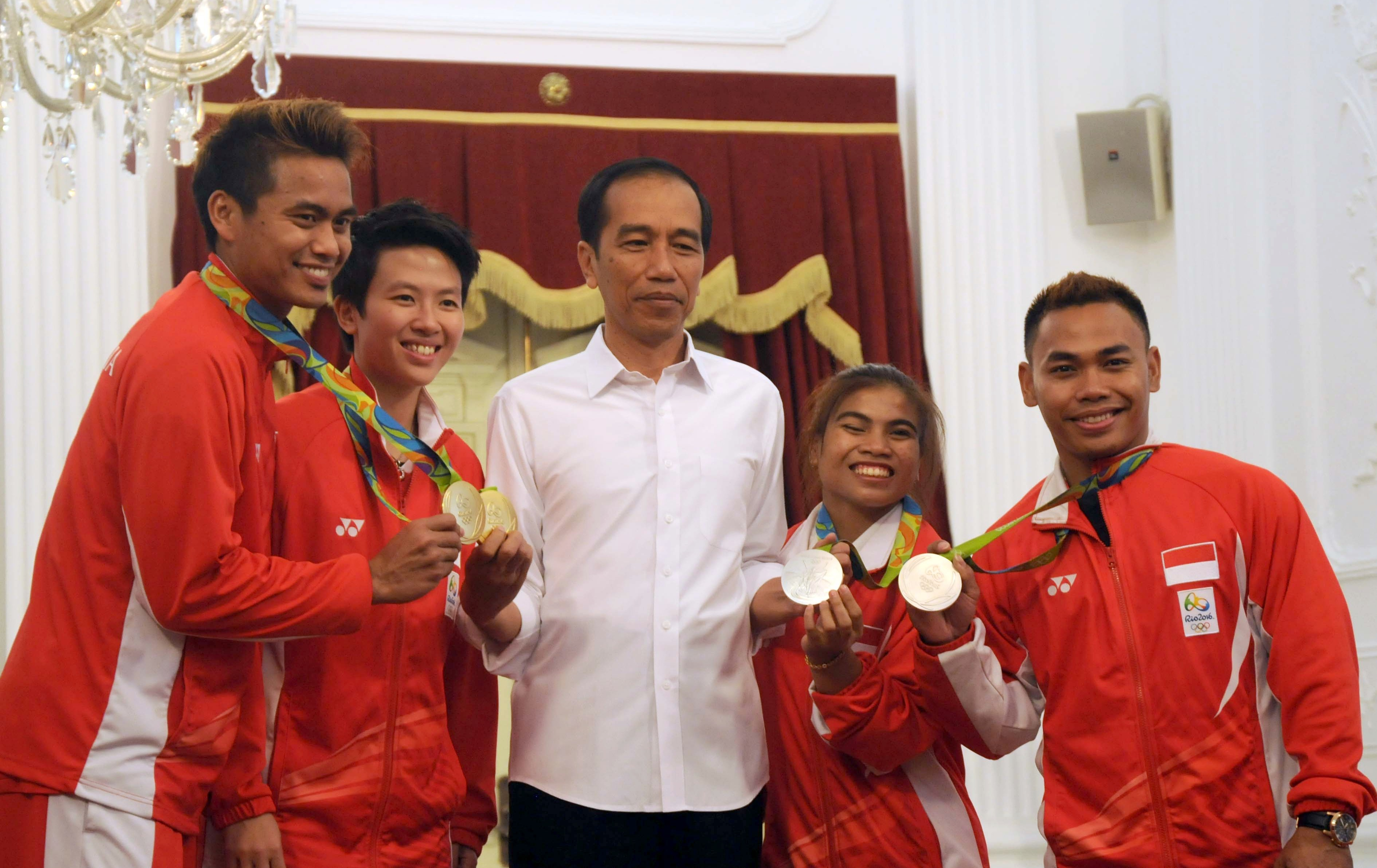
2016 Summer Olympics medalists at the State Palace in Jakarta. Left-right: Ahmad, Natsir, Widodo, Agustiani and Irawan.

Irawan won his second consecutive Olympic bronze medal in 2012, lifting 317 kg in total. He improved to a silver medal at the 2016 Rio Olympics. He also become world champion in newly created 61 kg category in world weightlifting championship 2018 in Ashgabat, Turkmenistan, also world record holder in clean & jerk at 174 kg and world record holder in total lift at 317 kg in that category.

He represented Indonesia at the 2020 Summer Olympics in Tokyo, Japan. He won the silver in the men's 61 kg event at the 2020 Summer Olympics in Tokyo, Japan.

Irawan represented Indonesia in the 61 kg men's weightlifting at the 2024 Summer Olympics in Paris, France after qualifying in the International Weightlifting World Cup in Phuket, Thailand last 3 April 2024. He aimed to become the first weightlifter in history to win five Olympic medals. Irawan had 135 kg in Snatch and placed second after the lift, but he failed three attempts to lift in Clean & Jerk.

== Major results ==
Year	Venue	Weight	Snatch (kg)				Clean & Jerk (kg)				Total	Rank
Year	Venue	Weight	1	2	3	Rank	1	2	3	Rank	Total	Rank
Olympic Games
2008	Beijing, China	56 kg	125	~~130~~	130	—N/a	152	~~158~~	158	—N/a	288	3rd place, bronze medalist(s)
2012	London, Great Britain	62 kg	138	142	145	—N/a	~~168~~	168	172	—N/a	317	3rd place, bronze medalist(s)
2016	Rio de Janeiro, Brazil	62 kg	142	~~146~~	~~146~~	—N/a	170	~~176~~	~~179~~	—N/a	312	2nd place, silver medalist(s)
2021	Tokyo, Japan	61 kg	137	~~141~~	~~141~~	—N/a	165	~~177~~	~~177~~	—N/a	302	2nd place, silver medalist(s)
2024	Paris, France	61 kg	~~135~~	135	~~139~~	—N/a	~~162~~	~~162~~	~~165~~	—N/a	DNF	—
World Championships
2006	Santo Domingo, Dominican Republic	56 kg	~~116~~	116	~~121~~	9	143	150	~~153~~	7	266	6
2007	Chiang Mai, Thailand	56 kg	~~124~~	124	~~127~~	5	154	~~156~~	~~156~~	3rd place, bronze medalist(s)	278	3rd place, bronze medalist(s)
2009	Goyang, South Korea	62 kg	135	140	~~143~~	3rd place, bronze medalist(s)	166	171	174	1st place, gold medalist(s)	315	2nd place, silver medalist(s)
2010	Antalya, Turkey	62 kg	135	140	~~143~~	5	166	171	172	3rd place, bronze medalist(s)	312	4
2011	Paris, France	62 kg	135	~~139~~	139	4	165	171	~~173~~	2nd place, silver medalist(s)	310	3rd place, bronze medalist(s)
2014	Almaty, Kazakhstan	62 kg	~~136~~	136	141	4	165	~~171~~	175	2nd place, silver medalist(s)	316	2nd place, silver medalist(s)
2015	Houston, United States	62 kg	138	~~142~~	~~143~~	4	166	~~176~~	~~177~~	5	304	4
2018	Ashgabat, Turkmenistan	61 kg	137	141	143	1st place, gold medalist(s)	165	170	174 WR	1st place, gold medalist(s)	317 WR	1st place, gold medalist(s)
2019	Pattaya, Thailand	61 kg	~~136~~	136	140	2nd place, silver medalist(s)	~~166~~	166	~~175~~	4	306	2nd place, silver medalist(s)
2022	Bogotá, Colombia	61 kg	135	139	139	3rd place, bronze medalist(s)	165	170	171	2nd place, silver medalist(s)	300	2nd place, silver medalist(s)
2023	Riyadh, Saudi Arabia	67 kg	142	146	~~150~~	2nd place, silver medalist(s)	165	175	~~181~~	4	321	2nd place, silver medalist(s)
2025	Førde, Norway	65 kg	~~135~~	~~136~~	137	3rd place, bronze medalist(s)	163	~~166~~	~~167~~	9	300	7
2026	Ningbo, China	65 kg	133	~~136~~	~~137~~	9	164	168	~~171~~	8	301	9
IWF World Cup
2019	Fuzhou, China	61 kg	136	~~139~~	~~140~~	2nd place, silver medalist(s)	~~161~~	161	~~166~~	2nd place, silver medalist(s)	297	1st place, gold medalist(s)
2024	Phuket, Thailand	61 kg	133	—	—	2nd place, silver medalist(s)	~~162~~	—	—	—	—	—
Asian Games
2010	Guangzhou, China	62 kg	137	141	~~144~~	—N/a	~~170~~	170	~~177~~	—N/a	311	3rd place, bronze medalist(s)
2014	Incheon, South Korea	62 kg	138	142	~~145~~	—N/a	166	~~174~~	~~174~~	—N/a	308	3rd place, bronze medalist(s)
2018	Jakarta, Indonesia	62 kg	137	141	~~145~~	—N/a	165	170	~~175~~	—N/a	311	1st place, gold medalist(s)
2023	Hangzhou, China	67 kg	~~142~~	145	~~148~~	—N/a	~~175~~	~~175~~	~~175~~	—N/a	—	—
2026	Nagoya, Japan	65 kg	~~135~~	135	~~138~~	—N/a	~~167~~	167	~~175~~	—N/a	302	4
Asian Championships
2008	Kanazawa, Japan	61 kg	125	130	135	3rd place, bronze medalist(s)	160	165	170	2nd place, silver medalist(s)	305	2nd place, silver medalist(s)
2019	Ningbo, China	61 kg	133	~~138~~	~~138~~	5	~~166~~	166	~~171~~	3rd place, bronze medalist(s)	299	3rd place, bronze medalist(s)
2024	Tashkent, Uzbekistan	61 kg	—	—	—	—	—	—	—	—	—	—

== Awards ==
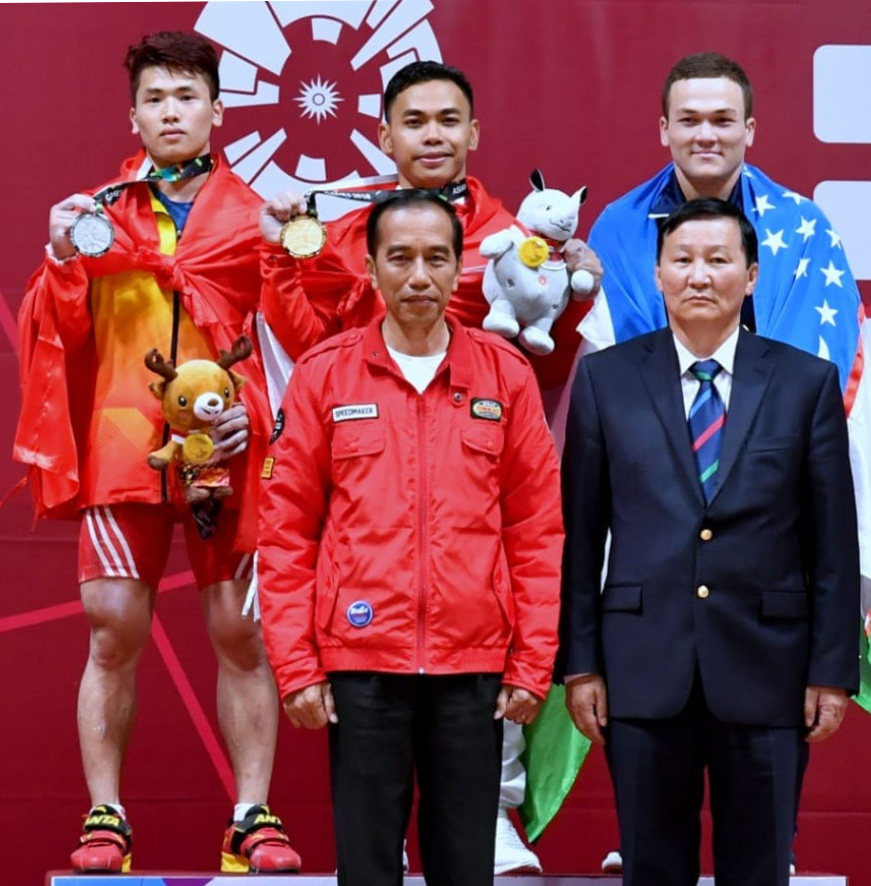
2018 Asian Games podium, Left-right: Vinh, Irawan and Ergashev with President Joko Widodo (center)

Award	Year	Category	Result	Ref.
AORI	2009	Best Male Athlete	Nominated	
AORI	2011	Best Male Athlete	Nominated	
Golden Award SIWO PWI	2017	Best Male Athlete	Won	
Golden Award SIWO PWI	2019	Best Male Athlete	Nominated	
Golden Award SIWO PWI	2021	Best Male Athlete	Won	
Indonesian Sport Awards	2018	Favorite Male Athlete	Nominated	
KONI Award	2013	Best Athlete	Won	
KONI Award	2021	Best Athlete	Won	

Others:

By the Republic of Indonesia:

- 2009 - Satyalancana Wira Karya

By the province of East Java:

- 2021 - Jer Basuki Mawa Beya Golden Badge
