= Weightlifting at the 2012 Summer Olympics – Men's 62 kg =

Men's 62 kg at the Games of the XXX Olympiad
- Venue: ExCeL London
- Date: 30 July 2012
- Competitors: 15 from 13 nations

Medalists
1st place, gold medalist(s)		Kim Un-guk	North Korea
2nd place, silver medalist(s)		Óscar Figueroa	Colombia
3rd place, bronze medalist(s)		Eko Yuli Irawan	Indonesia

The Men's 62 kilograms weightlifting event at the 2012 Summer Olympics in London, United Kingdom, took place at ExCeL London on 30 July.

== Summary ==
Total score was the sum of the lifter's best result in each of the snatch and the clean and jerk, with three lifts allowed for each lift. In case of a tie, the lighter lifter won; if still tied, the lifter who took the fewest attempts to achieve the total score won. Lifters without a valid snatch score did not perform the clean and jerk.

== Schedule ==
All times are British Summer Time (UTC+01:00)

Date	Time	Event
30 July 2012	10:00	Group B
30 July 2012	19:00	Group A

== Records ==
Prior to this competition, the existing world and Olympic records were as follows.

World Record	Snatch	Shi Zhiyong (CHN)	153 kg	İzmir, Turkey	28 June 2002
World Record	Clean & Jerk	Le Maosheng (CHN)	182 kg	Busan, South Korea	2 October 2002
World Record	Total	Zhang Jie (CHN)	326 kg	Kanazawa, Japan	28 April 2008
Olympic Record	Snatch	Shi Zhiyong (CHN)	152 kg	Athens, Greece	16 August 2004
Olympic Record	Clean & Jerk	Zhang Xiangxiang (CHN)	176 kg	Beijing, China	10 August 2008
Olympic Record	Total	Nikolaj Pešalov (CRO)	325 kg	Sydney, Australia	17 September 2000

== Results ==
Rank	Athlete	Group	Body weight	Snatch (kg)				Clean & Jerk (kg)				Total
Rank	Athlete	Group	Body weight	1	2	3	Result	1	2	3	Result	Total
1st place, gold medalist(s)	Kim Un-guk (PRK)	A	61.77	145	150	153	153	170	~~174~~	174	174	327
2nd place, silver medalist(s)	Óscar Figueroa (COL)	A	61.76	137	140	~~142~~	140	~~177~~	~~177~~	177	177	317
3rd place, bronze medalist(s)	Eko Yuli Irawan (INA)	A	61.89	138	142	145	145	~~168~~	168	172	172	317
4	Zhang Jie (CHN)	A	61.86	140	~~145~~	~~145~~	140	174	~~178~~	~~178~~	174	314
5	Hurşit Atak (TUR)	A	61.93	130	~~134~~	~~134~~	130	~~166~~	166	172	172	302
6	Ümürbek Bazarbaýew (TKM)	A	61.95	~~135~~	135	~~139~~	135	~~162~~	~~165~~	167	167	302
7	Muhammad Hasbi (INA)	B	61.81	130	135	138	138	163	~~171~~	~~171~~	163	301
8	Ahmed Saad (EGY)	B	61.63	125	~~130~~	130	130	158	162	~~165~~	162	292
9	Manuel Minginfel (FSM)	B	61.86	122	127	~~130~~	127	~~158~~	~~158~~	158	158	285
10	Julio Salamanca (ESA)	B	61.03	110	~~115~~	~~115~~	110	~~150~~	150	~~155~~	150	260
11	Tuau Lapua Lapua (TUV)	B	61.62	104	108	~~111~~	108	126	131	135	135	243
12	Charles Ssekyaaya (UGA)	B	61.47	100	105	~~108~~	105	130	~~135~~	~~140~~	130	235
13	Stevick Patris (PLW)	B	61.34	100	104	~~108~~	104	125	130	~~132~~	130	234
—	Ji Hun-min (KOR)	A	61.57	135	~~140~~	~~142~~	135	~~160~~	~~165~~	~~165~~	—	—
DQ	Erol Bilgin (TUR)	A	61.90	135	~~139~~	~~140~~	135	~~165~~	165	~~169~~	165	~~300~~

Erol Bilgin of Turkey originally finished eighth, but he was disqualified in 2020 after a re-analysis of his samples from the 2012 Olympics resulted in an anti-doping violation.

== New records ==
Snatch	153 kg	Kim Un-guk (PRK)	OR
Clean & Jerk	177 kg	Óscar Figueroa (COL)	OR
Total	327 kg	Kim Un-guk (PRK)	WR
