= Weightlifting at the 2016 Summer Olympics – Men's 62 kg =

Men's 62 kg at the Games of the XXXI Olympiad
- Venue: Riocentro
- Date: 8 August 2016
- Competitors: 17 from 15 nations
- Winning total: 318 kg

Medalists
1st place, gold medalist(s)		Óscar Figueroa	Colombia
2nd place, silver medalist(s)		Eko Yuli Irawan	Indonesia
3rd place, bronze medalist(s)		Farkhad Kharki	Kazakhstan

The Men's 62 kg weightlifting competitions at the 2016 Summer Olympics in Rio de Janeiro took place on 8 August at the Pavilion 2 of Riocentro.

== Schedule ==
All times are Time in Brazil (UTC-03:00)

Date	Time	Event
8 August 2016	10:00	Group B
8 August 2016	19:00	Group A

== Records ==
Prior to this competition, the existing world and Olympic records were as follows.

World record	Snatch	Kim Un-guk (PRK)	154 kg	Incheon, South Korea	21 September 2014
World record	Clean & Jerk	Chen Lijun (CHN)	183 kg	Houston, United States	22 November 2015
World record	Total	Chen Lijun (CHN)	333 kg	Houston, United States	22 November 2015
Olympic record	Snatch	Kim Un-guk (PRK)	153 kg	London, United Kingdom	30 July 2012
Olympic record	Clean & Jerk	Óscar Figueroa (COL)	177 kg	London, United Kingdom	30 July 2012
Olympic record	Total	Kim Un-guk (PRK)	327 kg	London, United Kingdom	30 July 2012

== Results ==
Rank	Athlete	Nation	Group	Body weight	Snatch (kg)				Clean & Jerk (kg)				Total
Rank	Athlete	Nation	Group	Body weight	1	2	3	Result	1	2	3	Result	Total
1st place, gold medalist(s)	Óscar Figueroa	Colombia	A	61.86	137	142	~~145~~	142	172	176	~~179~~	176	318
2nd place, silver medalist(s)	Eko Yuli Irawan	Indonesia	A	61.91	142	~~146~~	~~146~~	142	170	~~176~~	~~179~~	170	312
3rd place, bronze medalist(s)	Farkhad Kharki	Kazakhstan	A	61.60	135	~~140~~	~~140~~	135	170	~~177~~	~~177~~	170	305
4	Yoichi Itokazu	Japan	A	61.87	126	130	133	133	160	165	169	169	302
5	Ahmed Saad	Egypt	A	62.00	127	131	133	133	155	161	~~164~~	161	294
6	Morea Baru	Papua New Guinea	A	61.72	122	126	~~129~~	126	159	164	~~168~~	164	290
7	Muhammad Hasbi	Indonesia	A	61.97	125	130	~~134~~	130	160	~~169~~	~~173~~	160	290
8	Vaipava Nevo Ioane	Samoa	B	61.90	115	120	~~122~~	120	151	161	~~165~~	161	281
9	Han Myeong-mok	South Korea	A	61.81	130	~~135~~	~~135~~	130	150	~~155~~	~~155~~	150	280
10	Julio Salamanca	El Salvador	B	62.00	115	~~120~~	120	120	150	~~155~~	155	155	275
11	Julio Acosta González	Chile	B	61.30	114	117	120	120	142	146	~~151~~	146	266
12	Yosuke Nakayama	Japan	B	62.00	121	~~124~~	~~124~~	121	140	145	~~150~~	145	266
13	Rick Yves Confiance	Seychelles	B	62.00	100	105	~~110~~	105	127	~~133~~	~~133~~	127	232
–	Jesús López Sanchez	Venezuela	B	61.90	125	125	~~129~~	125	–	–	–	–	–
–	Edouard Joseph	Haiti	B	60.20	102	107	~~112~~	107	–	–	–	–	–
–	Chen Lijun	China	A	61.97	~~143~~	~~143~~	–	–	–	–	–	–	–
–	Sudesh Peiris	Sri Lanka	B	62.00	~~120~~	~~120~~	~~120~~	–	–	–	–	–	–
