= Weightlifting at the 2010 South American Games – Men's 62kg =

The Men's 62 kg event at the 2010 South American Games was held over March 26 at 16:00.

== Medalists ==
Gold	Silver	Bronze
Diego Fernando Salazar; Colombia	Jesús López; Venezuela	Edison Lomas; Ecuador

== Results ==
Rank	Athlete	Bodyweight	Snatch			Clean & Jerk			Total
Rank	Athlete	Bodyweight	1	2	3	1	2	3	Total
1st place, gold medalist(s)	Diego Fernando Salazar (COL)	61.56	126	130	~~136~~	157	161	165	295
2nd place, silver medalist(s)	Jesús López (VEN)	62.00	122	127	~~129~~	158	165	~~169~~	292
3rd place, bronze medalist(s)	Edison Lomas (ECU)	61.46	110	115	120	~~137~~	137	142	262
	Jaime Eduardo Iturra (CHI)	61.70	115	120	~~122~~	~~140~~	~~140~~	~~145~~	DNF
