= Julio Acosta =

Julio Acosta may refer to:

- Julio Acosta García (1872–1954), president of Costa Rica
- Julio Acosta (weightlifter) (born 1987), Cuban-born Chilean weightlifter
