= Acorán Hernández =

Spanish weightlifter (born 1990)

Personal information
- Full name: Acorán Juan Hernández Mendoza
- Born: 30 December 1990 (age 35) Tenerife
- Weight: 61.73 kg (136.1 lb)

Sport
- Country: Spain
- Sport: Weightlifting
- Team: National team
Medal record
Men's weightlifting
Representing Spain
European Championships
Bronze medal – third place	2022 Tirana	67 kg
- Updated on 6 June 2022

Acorán Juan Hernández Mendoza (born 30 December 1990 in Tenerife) is a Spanish retired male weightlifter, competing in the 62 kg category and representing Spain at international competitions. He competed at world championships, most recently at the 2011 World Weightlifting Championships.

He retired from professional weightlifting on December 29th, 2025.

== Major results ==
Year	Venue	Weight	Snatch (kg)				Clean & Jerk (kg)				Total	Rank
Year	Venue	Weight	1	2	3	Rank	1	2	3	Rank	Total	Rank
World Championships
2011	Paris, France	62 kg	111	116	118	23	135	140	~~144~~	30	258	28
2010	Antalya, Turkey	62 kg	111	~~116~~	~~116~~	25	132	~~137~~	~~137~~	30	243	26
2009	Goyang, South Korea	62 kg	115	120	123	19	~~135~~	135	~~141~~	28	258	26

== See also ==
- Spanish records in Olympic weightlifting
- 2011 World Weightlifting Championships – Men's 62 kg
