= Trịnh Văn Vinh =

Vietnamese weightlifter (born 1995)

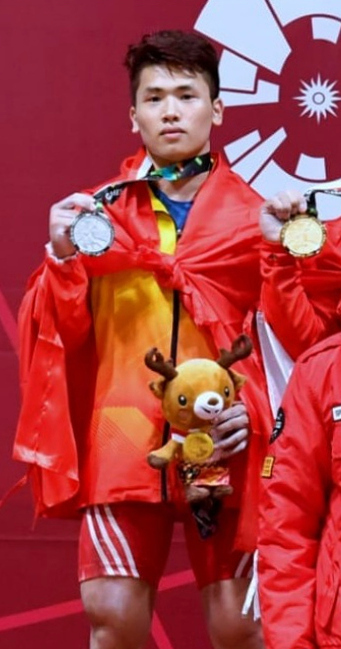
- Văn Vinh winning a silver medal at the 2018 Asian Games

Personal information
- Born: 17 December 1995 (age 30) Quế Võ, Bắc Ninh, Vietnam
- Weight: 61 kg (134 lb)

Achievements and titles
- Personal bests: Snatch: 136 kg (2017); Clean and jerk: 172 kg (2017); Total: 307 kg (2017)
Medal record
Men's weightlifting
Representing Vietnam
Asian Games
Silver medal – second place	2018 Jakarta	–62 kg
Asian Indoor and Martial Arts Games
Gold medal – first place	2017 Ashgabat	–62 kg
Asian Championships
Silver medal – second place	2016 Tashkent	–62 kg
Silver medal – second place	2017 Ashgabat	–62 kg
Bronze medal – third place	2024 Tashkent	–61 kg
SEA Games
Gold medal – first place	2017 Kuala Lumpur	–62 kg

Trịnh Văn Vinh (born 17 December 1995) is a Vietnamese weightlifter. He won a silver medal at the 2018 Asian Games. He also represented Vietnam at the 2024 Summer Olympics.

== Early life ==
Văn Vinh was born in 1995 in Quế Võ district, Bắc Ninh in a farming family. He started practicing weightlifting in 2008, after weightlifter coach Đõ Đình Du successfully convinced Văn Vinh's family to let him train at the province's Training Center, as he saw Văn Vinh's adaptable physique to the sport during a talent search in secondary schools throughout Bắc Ninh.

== Career ==
=== Early successes ===
Văn Vinh emerged as one of Vietnam's most promising weightlifters in the 62 kg category and was called up to the national team at the age of 20. As he began competing internationally, he won consecutive gold medals in the clean and jerk events and silver medals in the total lift at the 2016 Asian Championships. In 2017, Văn Vinh won the gold medal at the 62 kg snatch event in the 2017 World Championships, with a lift of 136 kg to set a personal record. In the 2017 SEA Games in Malaysia, Văn Vinh created a big surprise in the 62 kg category as he won the gold medal with a total lift of 307 kg and set the Games' record, defeating Olympics silver medalist Eko Yuli Irawan by 1 kg.

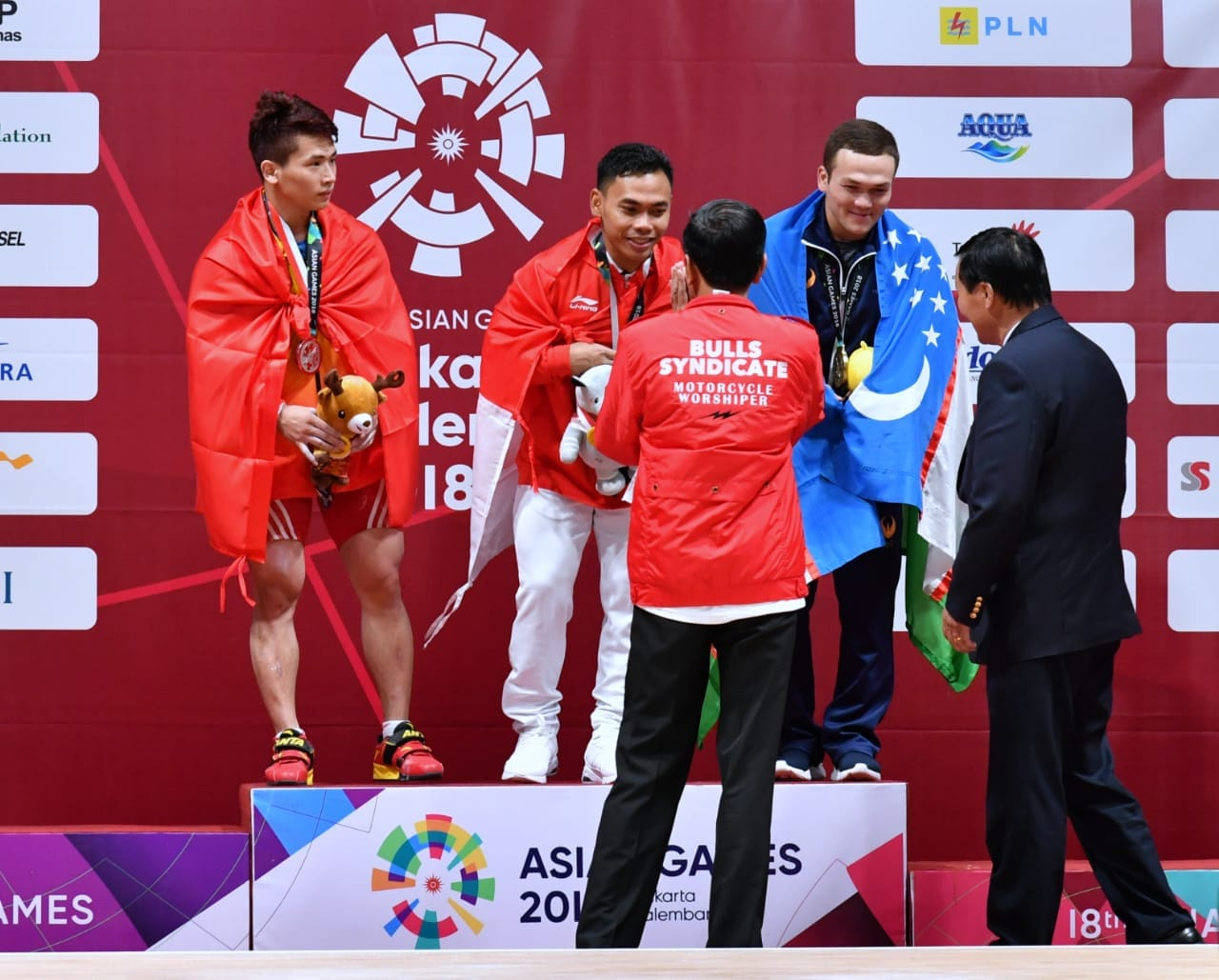
Trịnh Văn Vinh (left, with the silver medal) on the medal podium alongside Eko Yuli Irawan and Adkhamjon Ergashev at the 2018 Asian Games

An year later, Eko got his revenge after he winning the gold medal at the 62kg event at the 2018 Asian Games with a total lift of 311 kg. Văn Vinh won the silver medal at the second place with 12 kg less but still made history by becoming the first Vietnamese weightlifters to win a medal in this weight class.

=== Doping ban ===
Following his achievements in several major competitions, Văn Vinh was in the group of athletes receiving key investment with the target to win a medal at the 2020 Summer Olympics.

In November 2018, the International Weightlifting Federation (IWF) travelled to Vietnam and tested doping on Văn Vinh according to regulations. In February 2019, the test results announced that he tested positive for exogenous testosterone and another banned substances. As a result, the World Anti-Doping Agency (WADA) imposed a 4-year ban from competition a fine of US$5,000 and to Văn Vinh. He decided to not appeal to the decision and accepted the sanction. According to Văn Vinh, the banned substances were part of the medicaments he used to treat his injury to recover on time for the National championship.

=== Comeback and qualification to the Olympics ===
In February 2023, Văn Vinh finished his 4-year ban and returned to compete internationally. He participated in the 61 kg event in the Asian Games in China, ranked 6th after a total lift of 292 kg. In April 2024, he officially secured at spot at the 2024 Summer Olympics, after finishing in the top 10 of the 61 kg event at the 2024 IWF World Cup.

In August 2024, Văn Vinh competed in the men's 61 kg event at the 2024 Summer Olympics held in Paris, France. He failed three attempts to lift 128 kg in the Snatch and he did not compete in the Clean & Jerk. A successful attempt in the Snatch would have placed Văn Vinh in the third position after the lift.

== Achievements ==
Year	Venue	Weight	Snatch (kg)				Clean & Jerk (kg)				Total	Rank
Year	Venue	Weight	1	2	3	Rank	1	2	3	Rank	Total	Rank
Olympic Games
2024	Paris, France	61 kg	~~128~~	~~128~~	~~128~~	—N/a	—	—	—	—N/a	DNF	—
World Championships
2017	Anaheim, United States	62 kg	130	134	136	1st place, gold medalist(s)	~~165~~	~~165~~	~~166~~	—	—	—
2023	Riyadh, Saudi Arabia	61 kg	126	130	~~132~~	11	162	~~166~~	~~166~~	10	292	8
2024	Manama, Bahrain	61 kg	~~123~~	123	126	7	~~161~~	~~161~~	~~161~~	—	—	—
IWF World Cup
2024	Phuket, Thailand	61 kg	129	131	~~133~~	5	~~163~~	163	~~165~~	8	294	6
Asian Games
2018	Jakarta, Indonesia	62 kg	129	133	~~136~~	—N/a	162	166	~~179~~	—N/a	299	2nd place, silver medalist(s)
2023	Hangzhou, China	61 kg	128	~~131~~	~~132~~	—N/a	164	~~170~~	~~170~~	—N/a	292	6
Asian Championships
2016	Tashkent, Uzbekistan	62 kg	120	~~124~~	124	4	~~158~~	158	~~164~~	1st place, gold medalist(s)	282	2nd place, silver medalist(s)
2017	Ashgabat, Turkmenistan	62 kg	128	132	~~134~~	3rd place, bronze medalist(s)	165	167	~~170~~	2nd place, silver medalist(s)	299	2nd place, silver medalist(s)
2023	Jinju, South Korea	61 kg	~~128~~	~~128~~	~~128~~	—	~~162~~	163	~~167~~	6	—	—
2024	Tashkent, Uzbekistan	61 kg	129	129	~~131~~	4	~~161~~	~~161~~	161	3rd place, bronze medalist(s)	290	3rd place, bronze medalist(s)
