= List of Spanish records in Olympic weightlifting =

The following are the national records in Olympic weightlifting in Spain. Records are maintained in each weight class for the snatch lift, clean and jerk lift, and the total for both lifts by the Spanish Weightlifting Federation (Federación Española de Halterofilia).

== Current records ==
Key to tables: Awaiting ratification Not ratified or later rescinded by Spanish Weightlifting Federation

=== Men ===
Event	Record	Athlete	Date	Meet	Place	Ref
60 kg
Snatch	123 kg	Standard				
Clean & Jerk	146 kg	Standard				
Total	269 kg	Standard				
65 kg
Snatch	137 kg	Standard				
Clean & Jerk	161 kg	Standard				
Total	298 kg	Standard				
70 kg
Snatch						
Clean & Jerk						
Total						
75 kg
Snatch						
Clean & Jerk						
Total						
85 kg
Snatch						
Clean & Jerk						
Total						
95 kg
Snatch						
Clean & Jerk						
Total						
110 kg
Snatch	188 kg	Standard				
Clean & Jerk	221 kg	Marcos Ruiz	10 October 2025	World Championships	Førde, Norway	
Total	406 kg	Marcos Ruiz	10 October 2025	World Championships	Førde, Norway	
+110 kg
Snatch	180 kg	Standard				
Clean & Jerk	220 kg	Standard				
Total	400 kg	Standard				

=== Women ===
Event	Record	Athlete	Date	Meet	Place	Ref
49 kg
Snatch						
Clean & Jerk						
Total						
53 kg
Snatch	83 kg	Malen Monasterio	14 June 2025	Spanish Championships	Zaragoza, Spain	
Clean & Jerk	103 kg	Lucia González	15 November 2025		Zarautz, Spain	
Clean & Jerk	105 kg	Alba Sánchez	31 August 2026	Mediterranean Games	San Giorgio Ionico, Italy	
Total	185 kg	Malen Monasterio	2 October 2025	World Championships	Førde, Norway	
Total	186 kg	Alba Sánchez	31 August 2026	Mediterranean Games	San Giorgio Ionico, Italy	
57 kg
Snatch						
Clean & Jerk						
Total						
61 kg
Snatch						
Clean & Jerk						
Total						
69 kg
Snatch	100 kg	Naroa Arrasate	22 April 2026	European Championships	Batumi, Georgia	
Clean & Jerk	128 kg	Naroa Arrasate	22 April 2026	European Championships	Batumi, Georgia	
Clean & Jerk	131 kg	Naroa Arrasate	3 November 2026	World Championships	Ningbo, China	
Total	228 kg	Naroa Arrasate	22 April 2026	European Championships	Batumi, Georgia	
77 kg
Snatch	108 kg	Standard				
Clean & Jerk	133 kg	Standard				
Total	242 kg	Standard				
86 kg
Snatch	115 kg	Standard				
Clean & Jerk	140 kg	Standard				
Total	254 kg	Standard				
+86 kg
Snatch	112 kg	Standard				
Clean & Jerk	136 kg	Standard				
Total	248 kg	Standard				

== Historical records ==
=== Men (2025–2026) ===
Event	Record	Athlete	Date	Meet	Place	Ref
71 kg
Snatch	147 kg	Standard				
Clean & Jerk	181 kg	Standard				
Total	329 kg	Standard				
79 kg
Snatch	159 kg	Standard				
Clean & Jerk	191 kg	Standard				
Total	350 kg	Standard				
88 kg
Snatch	155 kg	Javier González	14 June 2025	Spanish Championships	Zaragoza, Spain	
Clean & Jerk	190 kg	Javier González	14 June 2025	Spanish Championships	Zaragoza, Spain	
Total	345 kg	Javier González	14 June 2025	Spanish Championships	Zaragoza, Spain	
94 kg
Snatch	158 kg	Standard				
Clean & Jerk	193 kg	Javier González	7 March 2026		Seville, Spain	
Total	345 kg	Standard				

=== Men (2018–2025) ===
Event	Record	Athlete	Date	Meet	Place	Ref
55 kg
Snatch	115 kg	Josué Brachi	2 November 2018	World Championships	Ashgabat, Turkmenistan	
Clean & Jerk	141 kg	Josué Brachi	29 May 2022	European Championships	Tirana, Albania	
Total	256 kg	Josué Brachi	29 May 2022	European Championships	Tirana, Albania	
61 kg
Snatch	125 kg	Josué Brachi	23 February 2019	Copa de España	Alzira, Spain	
Clean & Jerk	148 kg	Josué Brachi	7 April 2019	European Championships	Batumi, Georgia	
Total	273 kg	Josué Brachi	7 April 2019	European Championships	Batumi, Georgia	
67 kg
Snatch	140 kg	Acorán Hernández	17 April 2023	European Championships	Yerevan, Armenia	
Clean & Jerk	165 kg	Acorán Hernández	17 April 2023	European Championships	Yerevan, Armenia	
Total	305 kg	Acorán Hernández	17 April 2023	European Championships	Yerevan, Armenia	
73 kg
Snatch	150 kg	David Sánchez	18 April 2023	European Championships	Yerevan, Armenia	
Clean & Jerk	185 kg	David Sánchez	18 April 2023	European Championships	Yerevan, Armenia	
Total	335 kg	David Sánchez	18 April 2023	European Championships	Yerevan, Armenia	
81 kg
Snatch	162 kg	Andrés Mata	22 September 2019	World Championships	Pattaya, Thailand	
Clean & Jerk	194 kg	Andrés Mata	22 September 2019	World Championships	Pattaya, Thailand	
Total	356 kg	Andrés Mata	22 September 2019	World Championships	Pattaya, Thailand	
89 kg
Snatch	156 kg	Andrés Mata	2 April 2022	Copa de España	Cullera, Spain	
Clean & Jerk	191 kg	Andrés Mata	26 November 2022	Copa del Rey	Ourense, Spain	
Total	346 kg	Andrés Mata	2 April 2022	Copa de España	Cullera, Spain	
96 kg
Snatch	160 kg	Manuel Sánchez	8 June 2019	Spanish Championships	Madrid, Spain	
Clean & Jerk	190 kg	Manuel Sánchez	8 June 2019	Spanish Championships	Madrid, Spain	
Total	350 kg	Manuel Sánchez	8 June 2019	Spanish Championships	Madrid, Spain	
102 kg
Snatch	183 kg	Marcos Ruiz	13 December 2024	World Championships	Manama, Bahrain	
Clean & Jerk	212 kg	Marcos Ruiz	13 December 2024	World Championships	Manama, Bahrain	
Total	395 kg	Marcos Ruiz	13 December 2024	World Championships	Manama, Bahrain	
109 kg
Snatch	185 kg	Marcos Ruiz	14 November 2020	Spanish Championships	A Coruña, Spain	
Clean & Jerk	220 kg	Marcos Ruiz	10 April 2021	European Championships	Moscow, Russia	
Total	401 kg	Marcos Ruiz	14 November 2020	Spanish Championships	A Coruña, Spain	
+109 kg
Snatch	180 kg	Marcos Ruíz	4 August 2021	Olympic Games	Tokyo, Japan	
Clean & Jerk	220 kg	Standard				
Total	400 kg	Standard				

=== Men (1998–2018) ===
Event	Record	Athlete	Date	Meet	Place	Ref
-56 kg
Snatch	121 kg	Josué Brachi	10 April 2016	European Championships	Førde, Norway	
Clean & Jerk	143 kg	Josué Brachi	10 April 2016	European Championships	Førde, Norway	
Total	264 kg	Josué Brachi	10 April 2016	European Championships	Førde, Norway	
-62 kg
Snatch	124 kg	Josué Brachi	28 October 2017	Copa S.M. el Rey	Madrid, Spain	
Clean & Jerk	148 kg	Manuel Martín	8 July 2005			
Total	266 kg	Josué Brachi	28 October 2017	Copa S.M. el Rey	Madrid, Spain	
-69 kg
Snatch	143 kg	David Sánchez	12 April 2016	European Championships	Førde, Norway	
Clean & Jerk	176 kg	David Sánchez	24 November 2014	European Junior Championships	Limassol, Cyprus	
Total	318 kg	David Sánchez	12 April 2016	European Championships	Førde, Norway	
-77 kg
Snatch	157 kg	Andrés Mata	29 March 2018	European Championships	Bucharest, Romania	
Clean & Jerk	190 kg	Andrés Mata	5 December 2012	European Junior Championships	Eilat, Israel	
Total	344 kg	Andrés Mata	2 December 2017	World Championships	Anaheim, United States	
-85 kg
Snatch	162 kg	José Juan Navarro	29 June 2005	Mediterranean Games	Almería, Spain	
Clean & Jerk	195 kg	José Juan Navarro	23 April 2005	European Championships	Sofia, Bulgaria	
Total	357 kg	José Juan Navarro	29 June 2005	Mediterranean Games	Almería, Spain	
-94 kg
Snatch	175 kg	Santiago Martínez	23 August 2004	Olympic Games	Athens, Greece	
Clean & Jerk	210 kg	José Juan Navarro	6 May 2006	European Championships	Władysławowo, Poland	
Total	383 kg	José Juan Navarro	17 August 2008	Olympic Games	Beijing, China	
-105 kg
Snatch	180 kg	Santiago Martínez	8 July 2006	National Championships	Gijón, Spain	
Clean & Jerk	211 kg	Marcos Ruiz	4 December 2017	World Championships	Anaheim, United States	
Total	391 kg	Marcos Ruiz	4 December 2017	World Championships	Anaheim, United States	
+105 kg
Snatch	180 kg	Jon Tecedor	28 November 1999	World Championships	Athens, Greece	
Clean & Jerk	220 kg	Bruno Soto	18 April 1999	European Championships	A Coruña, Spain	
Total	400 kg	Jon Tecedor	28 November 1999	World Championships	Athens, Greece	

=== Women (2025–2026) ===
Event	Record	Athlete	Date	Meet	Place	Ref
48 kg
Snatch	79 kg	Marta García	7 March 2026		Seville, Spain	
Clean & Jerk	98 kg	Lucia González	28 October 2025	European Junior Championships	Durrës, Albania	
Total	175 kg	Lucia González	28 October 2025	European Junior Championships	Durrës, Albania	
58 kg
Snatch	90 kg	María Olalla	3 October 2025	World Championships	Førde, Norway	
Clean & Jerk	118 kg	María Olalla	29 October 2025	European Junior Championships	Durrës, Albania	
Total	206 kg	María Olalla	3 October 2025	World Championships	Førde, Norway	
63 kg
Snatch	95 kg	María Olalla	21 April 2026	European Championships	Batumi, Georgia	
Clean & Jerk	120 kg	Standard				
Total	213 kg	Standard				

=== Women (2018–2025) ===
Event	Record	Athlete	Date	Meet	Place	Ref
45 kg
Snatch	76 kg	Marta García	26 October 2024	European U23 Championships	Raszyn, Poland	
Snatch	77 kg	Marta García	13 April 2025	European Championships	Chișinău, Moldova	
Clean & Jerk	89 kg	Marta García	9 June 2024		Ourense, Spain	
Total	165 kg	Marta García	26 October 2024	European U23 Championships	Raszyn, Poland	
49 kg
Snatch	78 kg	Atenery Hernández	1 July 2022	Mediterranean Games	Oran, Algeria	
Clean & Jerk	96 kg	Atenery Hernández	1 July 2022	Mediterranean Games	Oran, Algeria	
Total	174 kg	Atenery Hernández	1 July 2022	Mediterranean Games	Oran, Algeria	
55 kg
Snatch	86 kg	Atenery Hernández	29 May 2022	European Championships	Tirana, Albania	
Clean & Jerk	105 kg	Atenery Hernández	2 April 2022	Copa de España	Cullera, Spain	
Total	189 kg	Atenery Hernández	2 April 2022	Copa de España	Cullera, Spain	
59 kg
Snatch	91 kg	Irene Martínez	11 June 2022		Salamanca, Spain	
Clean & Jerk	113 kg	María Olalla	21 September 2024	World Junior Championships	León, Spain	
Total	203 kg	María Olalla	21 September 2024	World Junior Championships	León, Spain	
64 kg
Snatch	95 kg	Naroa Arrasate	29 October 2024	European U23 Championships	Raszyn, Poland	
Clean & Jerk	122 kg	Naroa Arrasate	10 December 2024	World Championships	Manama, Bahrain	
Total	216 kg	Naroa Arrasate	10 December 2024	World Championships	Manama, Bahrain	
71 kg
Snatch	97 kg	Standard				
Clean & Jerk	122 kg	Naroa Arrasate	5 October 2024		Almendralejo, Spain	
Total	216 kg	Naroa Arrasate	5 October 2024		Almendralejo, Spain	
76 kg
Snatch	108 kg	Lidia Valentín	11 April 2019	European Championships	Batumi, Georgia	
Clean & Jerk	133 kg	Lidia Valentín	11 April 2019	European Championships	Batumi, Georgia	
Total	241 kg	Lidia Valentín	11 April 2019	European Championships	Batumi, Georgia	
81 kg
Snatch	113 kg	Lidia Valentín	8 November 2018	World Championships	Ashgabat, Turkmenistan	
Clean & Jerk	138 kg	Lidia Valentín	25 September 2019	World Championships	Pattaya, Thailand	
Total	249 kg	Lidia Valentín	8 November 2018	World Championships	Ashgabat, Turkmenistan	
87 kg
Snatch	107 kg	Standard				
Clean & Jerk	130 kg	Standard				
Total	237 kg	Standard				
+87 kg
Snatch	112 kg	Standard				
Clean & Jerk	136 kg	Standard				
Total	248 kg	Standard				

=== Women (1998–2018) ===
Event	Record	Athlete	Date	Meet	Place	Ref
-48 kg
Snatch	85 kg	Estefanía Juan	17 April 2007	European Championships	Strasbourg, France	
Clean & Jerk	104 kg	Estefanía Juan	1 October 2006	World Championships	Santo Domingo, Dominican Republic	
Total	189 kg	Estefanía Juan	17 April 2007	European Championships	Strasbourg, France	
-53 kg
Snatch	88 kg	Estefanía Juan	26 August 2006		Valencia, Spain	
Clean & Jerk	108 kg	Estefanía Juan	26 August 2006		Valencia, Spain	
Total	196 kg	Estefanía Juan	26 August 2006		Valencia, Spain	
-58 kg
Snatch	90 kg	María de la Puente	29 March 2008		Valencia, Spain	
Clean & Jerk	113 kg	Alba Sánchez	3 April 2017	European Championships	Split, Croatia	
Total	202 kg	Alba Sánchez	3 April 2017	European Championships	Split, Croatia	
-63 kg
Snatch	97 kg	Irene Martínez	11 June 2016	National Championships	Madrid, Spain	
Clean & Jerk	113 kg	Sheila Ramos	10 July 2010	National Championships	A Coruña, Spain	
Total	207 kg	Irene Martínez	11 June 2016	National Championships	Madrid, Spain	
-69 kg
Snatch	102,5 kg	Tatiana Fernández	21 April 2005	European Championships	Sofia, Bulgaria	
Clean & Jerk	124 kg	Sheila Ramos	25 November 2015	World Championships	Houston, United States	
Total	226 kg	Sheila Ramos	25 November 2015	World Championships	Houston, United States	
-75 kg
Snatch	124 kg	Lidia Valentín	15 November 2014	World Championships	Almaty, Kazakhstan	
Clean & Jerk	147 kg	Lidia Valentín	10 April 2014	European Championships	Tel Aviv, Israel	
Total	268 kg	Lidia Valentín	10 April 2014	European Championships	Tel Aviv, Israel	
-90 kg
Snatch	124 kg	Standard				
Clean & Jerk	150 kg	Standard				
Total	274 kg	Standard				
+90 kg
Snatch	112 kg	Standard				
Clean & Jerk	136 kg	Standard				
Total	248 kg	Standard				
