= Yang Fan (weightlifter) =

Chinese weightlifter (born 1987)

Personal information
- Nationality: Chinese
- Born: 16 October 1987 (age 38)
- Weight: 61.65 kg (136 lb)

Chinese name
- Traditional Chinese: 楊帆
- Simplified Chinese: 杨帆
- Hanyu Pinyin: Yáng Fān

Sport
- Country: China
- Sport: Weightlifting
- Event: –62 kg
Medal record
Representing China
World Championships
| Gold medal – first place | 2007 Chiang Mai | –62 kg |
| Bronze medal – third place | 2009 Goyang | –62 kg |

Yang Fan (born 16 October 1987) is a former Chinese weightlifter, and world champion competing in the −62 kg division.

== Major results ==
| Year | Venue | Weight | Snatch (kg) | | | | Clean & Jerk (kg) | | | | Total | Rank |
| Year | Venue | Weight | 1 | 2 | 3 | Rank | 1 | 2 | 3 | Rank | Total | Rank |
Representing China
World Championships
| 2007 | Chiang Mai, Thailand | 62 kg | 139 | 142 | ~~144~~ | 1st place, gold medalist(s) | 169 | 172 | 173 | 1st place, gold medalist(s) | 315 | 1st place, gold medalist(s) |
| 2009 | Goyang, South Korea | 62 kg | 140 | 144 | ~~146~~ | 2nd place, silver medalist(s) | 170 | ~~175~~ | ~~175~~ | 3rd place, bronze medalist(s) | 314 | 3rd place, bronze medalist(s) |
