= Zhou Jun (weightlifter) =

Chinese weightlifter (born 1995)

Personal information
- Native name: 周俊
- Nationality: Chinese
- Born: 27 February 1995 (age 31) Hubei, China
- Height: 1.55 m (5 ft 1 in)
- Weight: 58 kg (128 lb)

Sport
- Sport: Weightlifting
Medal record
Women's weightlifting
Representing China
Asian Championships
Silver medal – second place	2016 Tashkent	Women's 58 kg
Bronze medal – third place	2012 Pyeongtaek	Women's 58 kg

Zhou Jun (Chinese: 周俊; pinyin: Zhōu Jùn; born 27 February 1995) is a Chinese weightlifter who competed at the 2012 Summer Olympics in the Women's 53 kg. She failed all her three attempts and was not placed.

She won the bronze medal in the women's 58 kg class at the 2012 Asian Weightlifting Championships.
