= Jesús López (weightlifter) =

Venezuelan weightlifter

Personal information
- Full name: Jesús Antonio López Sánchez
- Born: 17 December 1984 (age 41)
- Weight: 61.91 kg (136.5 lb)

Sport
- Country: Venezuela
- Sport: Weightlifting
- Team: National team
- Updated on 31 August 2016

Jesús Antonio López Sánchez (Note: In this Spanish name, the first or paternal surname is López and the second or maternal family name is Sánchez.) (born 17 December 1984) is a Venezuelan male weightlifter, competing in the 62 kg category and representing Venezuela at international competitions. He participated at the 2016 Summer Olympics in the men's 62 kg event. He competed at world championships, including at the 2015 World Weightlifting Championships.

== Major results ==
Year	Venue	Weight	Snatch (kg)				Clean & Jerk (kg)				Total	Rank
Year	Venue	Weight	1	2	3	Rank	1	2	3	Rank	Total	Rank
World Championships
2015	Houston, United States	62 kg	123	126	~~128~~	17	152	156	158	13	284	14
2014	Almaty, Kazakhstan	62 kg	110	115	---	30	~~146~~	~~146~~	~~146~~	---	0	---
2011	Paris, France	62 kg	120	~~125~~	125	14	151	156	~~160~~	14	281	12
2007	Chiang Mai, Thailand	62 kg	117	121	123	18	150	~~155~~	155	16	278	17
2006	Santo Domingo, Dominican Republic	62 kg	115	~~120~~	120	19	148	152	~~157~~	13	272.0	17
