= 2011 in weightlifting =

This article lists the main weightlifting events and their results for 2011.

== World & Grand Prix weightlifting championships ==
- January 15 – ?: 2011 Grand Prix #1 in Fujian
  - China won both the gold and overall medal tallies.
- May 8 – ?: 2011 World Youth Weightlifting Championships in (Peru) Lima
  - China and Russia won 5 gold and 9 overall medals each.
- June 29 – ?: 2011 World Junior Weightlifting Championships in (Malaysia) Penang
  - China won the gold medal tally. Russia won the overall medal tally.
- November 4 – 13: 2011 World Weightlifting Championships in (France) Paris
  - China won both the gold and overall medal tallies.
- December 17 – ?: 2011 Grand Prix #2 (President's Cup) in (Russia) Belgorod
  - Men's 94 kg winner: (Russia) Andrey Demanov
  - Men's 105 kg winner: (Russia) David Bedzhanyan
  - Men's +105 kg winner: (Russia) Ruslan Albegov
  - Women's 75 kg winner: (Russia) Natalia Zabolotnaya
  - Women's +75 kg winner: (Russia) Tatiana Kashirina

== Continental & regional weightlifting championships ==
- April 7 – ?: 2011 Pan American Youth Weightlifting Championships in (Venezuela) Margarita Island
  - Colombia won both the gold and overall medal tallies.
- April 9 – ?: 2011 Asian Weightlifting Championships in Tongling
  - China won both the gold and overall medal tallies.
- April 11 – ?: 2011 European Weightlifting Championships in Kazan
  - Russia won both the gold and overall medal tallies.
- May 11 – ?: 2011 Oceania Weightlifting Championships in Darwin
  - Australia and Samoa won 3 gold medals each. Australia won the overall medal tally.
- August 21 – ?: 2011 European Youth Weightlifting Championships in (Poland) Ciechanów
  - Belarus won the gold medal tally. Russia won the overall medal tally.
- August 25 – ?: 2011 South American Weightlifting Championships in Valencia
  - Venezuela won both the gold and overall medal tallies.
- September 5 – ?: 2011 Asian Junior & Youth Weightlifting Championships in Pattaya
  - Junior: China won the gold medal tally. Thailand won the overall medal tally.
  - Youth: Thailand won both the gold and overall medal tallies.
- September 10 – ?: 2011 European Junior & U23 Weightlifting Championships in (Romania) Bucharest
  - Junior: Russia won both the gold and overall medal tallies.
  - U23: Russia won both the gold and overall medal tallies.
- October 10 – ?: 2011 African & Commonwealth (Senior, Junior, & Youth) Weightlifting Championships in Cape Town
  - Africa: Nigeria won the gold medal tally. South Africa won the overall medal tally.
  - Commonwealth Senior: India won both the gold and overall medal tallies.
  - Commonwealth Junior: Nigeria won the gold medal tally. India won the overall medal tally.
  - Commonwealth Youth: India won both the gold and overall medal tallies.
- November 25 – ?: 2011 Asian Inter-Club Senior & Junior Weightlifting Championships in Tashkent
  - Senior: Uzbekistan won both the gold and overall medal tallies.
  - Junior: Uzbekistan won both the gold and overall medal tallies.
