= Julio Acosta (weightlifter) =

Chilean weightlifter (born 1987)

Julio Acosta González (born July 22, 1987) is a Cuban-born Chilean weightlifter. He placed 11th in the men's 62 kg category at the 2016 Summer Olympics.
