= Zhang Jie (weightlifter) =

Chinese weightlifter (born 1987)

Medal record

Men's Weightlifting

Representing China

World Championships
Silver medal – second place	2010 Antalya	– 62 kg
Gold medal – first place	2011 Paris	– 62 kg

Asian Games
Gold medal – first place	2010 Guangzhou	– 62 kg

Asian Championships
Gold medal – first place	2005 Dubai	– 62 kg
Gold medal – first place	2008 Kanazawa	– 62 kg
Gold medal – first place	2011 Tongling	– 62 kg

Junior World Championships
Gold medal – first place	2007 Prague	– 62 kg

National Games of China
Silver medal – second place	2013 Liaoning	– 62 kg

Zhang Jie (Chinese: 张杰; born August 26, 1987, Changle) is a Chinese weightlifter and world champion (2011, Paris). He competed at the 2012 Olympic Games in London, finishing fourth in the 62 kg category.

== See also ==
- China at the 2012 Summer Olympics#Weightlifting
