= 2015 in weightlifting =

This article lists the main weightlifting events and their results for 2015.

== IWF Grand Prix ==
- September 21 – 23: 2015 IWF Grand Prix (Rio 2016 Olympic Qualifying Event) in Fuzhou
  - China won both the gold and overall medal tallies in both men's and women's events.
- December 12 & 13: 2015 IWF Grand Prix (5th Russian Federation President's Cup) in Grozny
  - Men: Kazakhstan and Russia won 4 gold and 9 overall medals each.
  - Women: Russia and the United States won 3 gold medals each. Kazakhstan won all six silver medals in the event.

== World weightlifting championships ==
- April 7 – 12: 2015 IWF Youth World Weightlifting Championships in (Peru) Lima
  - China won both the gold and overall medal tallies.
- June 6 – 14: 2015 IWF Junior World Weightlifting Championships in (Poland) Wrocław
  - China won both the gold and overall medal tallies.
- November 20 – 29: 2015 World Weightlifting Championships in (United States) Houston
  - China won both the gold and overall medal tallies in Big and Small categories.

== Continental weightlifting championships ==
- January 1 – 7: 2015 Asian Youth and Junior Weightlifting Championships in (Qatar) Doha
  - Junior: China won both the gold and overall medal tallies.
  - Youth: Chinese Taipei won both the gold and overall medal tallies.
- April 9 – 18: 2015 European Weightlifting Championships in (Georgia (country)) Tbilisi
  - Ukraine won the gold medal tally. Russia won the overall medal tally.
- May 5 – 10: 2015 Pan American Junior Weightlifting Championships in Cartagena
  - Junior Men: Host nation, Colombia, won both the gold and overall medal tallies.
  - Junior Women: The Dominican Republic won the gold medal tally. Colombia won the overall medal tally.
- August 1 – 9: 2015 European Youth Weightlifting Championships in (Sweden) Landskrona
  - Men's U15: Belarus won the gold medal tally. Turkey won the overall medal tally.
  - Women's U15: Romania won both the gold and overall medal tallies.
  - Men's U17: Armenia won both the gold and overall medal tallies.
  - Women's U17: Poland won the gold medal tally. Russia won the overall medal tally.
- September 3 – 12: 2015 Asian Weightlifting Championships in (Thailand) Phuket
  - Note: This event was scheduled to be held in Kathmandu in July. However, it was moved from there following the April 2015 Nepal earthquake.
  - China won the big and small rankings (gold and overall medal tallies).
- September 15 – 20: 2015 Pan American Youth Weightlifting Championships in San Luis Potosí
  - Youth Men: Colombia won the gold medal tally. Mexico won the overall medal tally.
  - Youth Women: Ecuador won both the gold and overall medal tallies.
- October 2 – 11: 2015 European Junior and U23 Weightlifting Championships in (Lithuania) Klaipėda
  - Russia won both the gold and overall medal tallies.
  - Men's Junior Team winners: Ukraine
  - Men's U23 Team winners: Russia
  - Women's Junior Team winners: Russia
  - Women's U23 Team winners: Turkey
- October 11 – 16: 2015 Commonwealth Weightlifting Championships in Pune
  - Youth: India won both the gold and overall medal tallies.
  - Junior: India won both the gold and overall medal tallies.
  - Senior: India won both the gold and overall medal tallies.

== IPC Powerlifting Regional Championships ==
- April 25 – 29: 2015 IPC Powerlifting Americas Open Championships in Mexico City
  - Host nation, Mexico, won the gold medal tally. Brazil won the overall medal tally.
- July 26 – 30: 2015 IPC Powerlifting Asian Open Championships in (Kazakhstan) Almaty
  - China won both the gold and overall medal tallies.
- November 24 – 28: 2015 IPC Powerlifting European Open Championships in (Hungary) Eger
  - China won both the gold and overall medal tallies.
