= Kim Un-guk =

North Korean weightlifter (born 1988)

Personal information
- Born: 28 October 1988 (age 37) Pyongyang, North Korea

Sport
- Club: April 25 Sports Club

Achievements and titles
- Personal bests: Snatch: 154 kg (2014, AGR, WR); Clean and jerk: 178 kg (2014); Total: 332 kg (2014, AGR)
Medal record
Men's Weightlifting
Representing North Korea
Olympic Games
| Gold medal – first place | 2012 London | – 62 kg |
World Championships
| Gold medal – first place | 2010 Antalya | – 62 kg |
| Silver medal – second place | 2011 Paris | – 62 kg |
| Silver medal – second place | 2013 Wrocław | – 62 kg |
| Gold medal – first place | 2014 Almaty | – 62 kg |
| Disqualified | 2015 Houston | – 62 kg |
Asian Games
| Silver medal – second place | 2010 Guangzhou | – 62 kg |
| Gold medal – first place | 2014 Incheon | – 62 kg |
Asian Championships
| Silver medal – second place | 2011 Tongling | – 62 kg |
| Gold medal – first place | 2013 Astana | – 62 kg |
East Asian Games
| Gold medal – first place | 2009 Hong Kong | – 62 kg |

- Kim Un-guk
- Hangul: 김은국
- Hanja: 金銀國
- RR: Gim Eunguk
- MR: Kim Ŭn'guk

Kim Un-guk (Korean: 김은국; pronounced [kim.ɯm.ɡuk̚]; born 28 October 1988) is a North Korean weightlifter, Olympic champion, and two-time world champion.

He is also a Labor Hero and People's Athlete.

== Career ==
At the Olympic Games 2012 he competed in the Men's 62-kg division, in the snatch portion of the competition he set an Olympic Record and matched the current world record of 153 kg. In the clean & jerk portion, his final attempt of 174 kg set a new world record total of 327 kg.

At the 2015 World Weightlifting Championships he failed a doping test and had his results disqualified. He was the original silver medalist.

Kim is an athlete at the April 25 Sports Club.

== Major results ==
| Year | Venue | Weight | Snatch (kg) | | | | Clean & Jerk (kg) | | | | Total | Rank |
| Year | Venue | Weight | 1 | 2 | 3 | Rank | 1 | 2 | 3 | Rank | Total | Rank |
Olympic Games
| 2012 | London, United Kingdom | 62 kg | 145 | 150 | 153 | 1 | 170 | ~~174~~ | 174 | 2 | 327 WR | 1st place, gold medalist(s) |
World Championships
| 2010 | Antalya, Turkey | 62 kg | 140 | 145 | 147 | 1st place, gold medalist(s) | 170 | ~~173~~ | 173 | 2nd place, silver medalist(s) | 320 | 1st place, gold medalist(s) |
| 2011 | Paris, France | 62 kg | 140 | 145 | 150 | 1st place, gold medalist(s) | 161 | 170 | ~~175~~ | 3rd place, bronze medalist(s) | 320 | 2nd place, silver medalist(s) |
| 2013 | Wrocław, Poland | 62 kg | 145 | 150 | ~~154~~ | 1st place, gold medalist(s) | 170 | ~~173~~ | ~~173~~ | 3rd place, bronze medalist(s) | 320 | 2nd place, silver medalist(s) |
| 2014 | Almaty, Kazakhstan | 62 kg | 145 | ~~150~~ | 150 | 1st place, gold medalist(s) | 170 | 174 | 175 | 1st place, gold medalist(s) | 325 | 1st place, gold medalist(s) |
| 2015 | Houston, United States | 62 kg | 146 | 151 | ~~155~~ | -- | 172 | 177 | ~~179~~ | -- | -- | DSQ |
Asian Games
| 2010 | Guangzhou, China | 62 kg | 140 | 145 | 147 | 1 | 170 | ~~175~~ | ~~175~~ | 2 | 317 | 2nd place, silver medalist(s) |
| 2014 | Incheon, South Korea | 62 kg | 147 | 152 | 154 WR | 1 | 170 | 174 | 178 | 1 | 332 WR | 1st place, gold medalist(s) |
