= Erol Bilgin =

Turkish weightlifter (born 1987)

Personal information
- Nationality: Turkish
- Born: 20 February 1987 (age 39) Kütahya, Turkey
- Height: 1.58 m (5.2 ft)
- Weight: 62 kg (137 lb)

Sport
- Country: Turkey
- Sport: Weightlifting
- Weight class: –62 kg
- Club: Tarım Kredi S.K. Aski Spor Kulübü
- Coached by: Hilmi Pekünlü
- Retired: yes
Medal record
Men's weightlifting
Representing Turkey
World Championships
| Bronze medal – third place | 2010 Antalya | 62 kg |
European Championships
| Gold medal – first place | 2009 Bucharest | 62 kg |
| Gold medal – first place | 2010 Minsk | 62 kg |
| Silver medal – second place | 2005 Sofia | 62 kg |
| Silver medal – second place | 2008 Lignano Sabbiadoro | 62 kg |
| Bronze medal – third place | 2007 Strasbourg | 62 kg |
Mediterranean Games
| Gold medal – first place | 2009 Pescara | 62 kg S |
| Gold medal – first place | 2009 Pescara | 62 kg C |
| Silver medal – second place | 2018 Tarragona | 62 kg S |
| Silver medal – second place | 2018 Tarragona | 62 kg C |
World University Championships
| Silver medal – second place | 2006 İzmir | 62 kg |
World Junior Championships
| Silver medal – second place | 2004 Minsk | 56 kg |
European Junior Championships
| Gold medal – first place | 2004 Burgas | 56 kg |
European U17 Championships
| Gold medal – first place | 2004 Stavanger | 56 kg |
European U16 Championships
| Gold medal – first place | 2002 Villeneuve | 45 kg |

Erol Bilgin (born 20 February 1987) is a Turkish former weightlifter who competed in the 62 kg category. A two-time European champion and 2010 World bronze medalist.

== Career ==
Bilgin was born in Kütahya, Turkey. He began lifting in 1998 at the Kütahya Gençlik Merkezi Sports Club and moved to Tarım Kredi S.K. in 2000. He was coached by Hilmi Pekünlü.

He achieved his first major international title at the 2004 European Junior Weightlifting Championships in Burgas, winning gold. He later became European Youth and Under-16 Champion, and in 2010 won bronze at the 2010 World Weightlifting Championships in Antalya, lifting 143 kg in snatch and 171 kg in clean & jerk (314 kg total).

Bilgin ranked 8th at the 2012 London Olympics, but in 2020 the International Olympic Committee announced his disqualification after re-analysis of his 2012 samples detected Dehydrochlormethyltestosterone (Oral Turinabol) and Stanozolol.

He also represented Turkey at the 2008 European Weightlifting Championships in Lignano Sabbiadoro, lifting 135 kg in snatch and 160 kg in clean & jerk for 295 kg total and a silver medal.

Bilgin’s consecutive gold medals at the 2009 Bucharest and 2010 Minsk European Championships established him among the best lightweight lifters of the late 2000s.

== Major results ==
| Year | Venue | Weight | Snatch (kg) | | | | Clean & Jerk (kg) | | | | Total | Rank |
| Year | Venue | Weight | 1 | 2 | 3 | Rank | 1 | 2 | 3 | Rank | Total | Rank |
Olympic Games
| 2012 | London, United Kingdom | 62 kg | 135 | ~~139~~ | ~~140~~ | 7 | ~~165~~ | 165 | ~~169~~ | 8 | 300 | DQ |
World Championships
| 2010 | Antalya, Turkey | 62 kg | 140 | 142 | 143 | 3rd place, bronze medalist(s) | 168 | 171 | ~~174~~ | 3rd place, bronze medalist(s) | 314 | 3rd place, bronze medalist(s) |
European Championships
| 2010 | Minsk, Belarus | 62 kg | 137 | 138 | 139 | 1st place, gold medalist(s) | 162 | 164 | 165 | 1st place, gold medalist(s) | 304 | 1st place, gold medalist(s) |
| 2009 | Bucharest, Romania | 62 kg | 131 | 133 | 133 | 1st place, gold medalist(s) | 156 | 158 | 160 | 1st place, gold medalist(s) | 293 | 1st place, gold medalist(s) |
| 2008 | Lignano Sabbiadoro, Italy | 62 kg | 133 | 134 | 135 | 2nd place, silver medalist(s) | 158 | 159 | 160 | 2nd place, silver medalist(s) | 295 | 2nd place, silver medalist(s) |
| 2007 | Strasbourg, France | 62 kg | 126 | 127 | 128 | 3rd place, bronze medalist(s) | 155 | 156 | 158 | 3rd place, bronze medalist(s) | 276 | 3rd place, bronze medalist(s) |
| 2005 | Sofia, Bulgaria | 56 kg | 118 | 119 | 120 | 2nd place, silver medalist(s) | 143 | 144 | 145 | 2nd place, silver medalist(s) | 265 | 2nd place, silver medalist(s) |
Mediterranean Games
| 2018 | Tarragona, Spain | 62 kg | 120 | 125 | ~~127~~ | 2nd place, silver medalist(s) | 155 | 165 | ~~169~~ | 2nd place, silver medalist(s) | 290 | 2nd place, silver medalist(s) |
World University Championships
| 2006 | İzmir, Turkey | 62 kg | 120 | 123 | 125 | 2nd place, silver medalist(s) | 158 | 160 | ~~162~~ | 2nd place, silver medalist(s) | 285 | 2nd place, silver medalist(s) |
World Junior Championships
| 2004 | Minsk, Belarus | 56 kg | 113 | 115 | ~~117~~ | 2nd place, silver medalist(s) | 133 | 135 | ~~137~~ | 2nd place, silver medalist(s) | 250 | 2nd place, silver medalist(s) |
European Junior Championships
| 2004 | Burgas, Bulgaria | 56 kg | 110 | 112 | 112.5 | 1st place, gold medalist(s) | 142 | 143 | 145 | 1st place, gold medalist(s) | 257.5 | 1st place, gold medalist(s) |
European U17 Championships
| 2004 | Stavanger, Norway | 56 kg | 108 | 110 | ~~112~~ | 1st place, gold medalist(s) | 133 | 134 | 135 | 1st place, gold medalist(s) | 245 | 1st place, gold medalist(s) |
European U16 Championships
| 2002 | Villeneuve-Loubet, France | 45 kg | 75 | 77.5 | ~~80~~ | 1st place, gold medalist(s) | 100 | 102.5 | ~~105~~ | 1st place, gold medalist(s) | 180 | 1st place, gold medalist(s) |
