= Yosuke Nakayama =

Japanese weightlifter

Personal information
- Born: 20 March 1987 (age 39)

Sport
- Sport: Weightlifting

Yosuke Nakayama (中山 陽介, Nakayama Yōsuke; born 20 March 1987) is a Japanese weightlifter. He competed in the men's 62 kg event at the 2016 Summer Olympics.
