= Ahmed Saad (weightlifter) =

Egyptian weightlifter (born 1986)

Personal information
- Full name: Ahmed Mohamed Saad
- Born: 1 November 1986 (age 40) Al-Fayuum, Egypt
- Height: 1.60 m (5 ft 3 in)
- Weight: 62 kg (137 lb)

Sport
- Country: Egypt
- Sport: Weightlifting
- Event: 62 kg
Medal record
African Games
| Gold medal – first place | 2019 Rabat | 67 kg |
Islamic Solidarity Games
| Silver medal – second place | 2017 Baku | 62 kg |

Ahmed Mohamed Saad (Arabic: احمد محمد •سعد, born 1 November 1986 in Al-Fayuum) is an Egyptian weightlifter. He competed at the 2012 Summer Olympics in the Men's 62 kg, finishing 9th.

At the 2016 Summer Olympics, he again competed in the Men's 62 kg, finishing 5th.

== Major results ==
| Year | Venue | Weight | Snatch (kg) | | | | Clean & Jerk (kg) | | | | Total | Rank |
| Year | Venue | Weight | 1 | 2 | 3 | Rank | 1 | 2 | 3 | Rank | Total | Rank |
Representing Egypt
Olympic Games
| 2004 | Athens, Greece | 56 kg | 97.5 | 102.5 | ~~105~~ | 12 | 120 | 127.5 | 130 | 11 | 232.5 | 11 |
| 2012 | (United Kingdom) London, Great Britain | 62 kg | 125 | ~~130~~ | 130 | 9 | 158 | 162 | ~~165~~ | 7 | 292 | 9 |
| 2016 | Rio de Janeiro, Brazil | 62 kg | 127 | 131 | 133 | 4 | 155 | 161 | ~~164~~ | 6 | 294 | 5 |
