= Bekzat Osmonaliev =

Kyrgyzstani weightlifter

Personal information
- Nationality: Kyrgyz
- Born: 28 December 1985 (age 39); Toktogul, Kyrgyzstan
- Weight: 61 kg (134 lb)

Sport
- Sport: Weightlifting
- Event: 62 kg
- Updated on 1 June 2016

Bekzat Osmonaliev is a Kyrgyzstani weightlifter. He competed at the 2012 Summer Olympics in the Men's 56 kg.

== Major results ==
Year	Venue	Weight	Snatch (kg)				Clean & Jerk (kg)				Total	Rank
Year	Venue	Weight	1	2	3	Rank	1	2	3	Rank	Total	Rank
Representing Kyrgyzstan
Olympic Games
2012	(United Kingdom) London, Great Britain	56 kg	120	125	127	5	~~147~~	~~147~~	~~147~~	—	—	—
World Championships
2014	Almaty, Kazakhstan	62 kg	~~117~~	119	~~124~~	21	~~143~~	~~143~~	~~143~~	—	—	—
2011	Paris, France	56 kg	~~118~~	~~120~~	120	6	140	145	~~150~~	11	265	7
2010	Antalya, Turkey	56 kg	115	~~118~~	~~118~~	12	131	136	141	11	256	11
2007	Chiang Mai, Thailand	62 kg	110	115	~~120~~	35	132	140	~~143~~	33	255	33
Asian Championships
2012	Pyeongtaek, South Korea	62 kg	120	126	~~131~~	7	150	~~156~~	~~156~~	6	276	6
2009	Taldykorgan, Kazakhstan	62 kg	120	~~125~~	125	7	~~145~~	~~145~~	~~145~~	—	—	—
2008	Kanazawa, Japan	62 kg	115	~~121~~	121	6	135	143	~~148~~	13	264	10
