= Nizom Sangov =

Tajikistani weightlifter

Personal information
- Nationality: Tajikistan
- Born: 26 June 1983 (age 43) Temurmalik, Khatlon, Tajik SSR, Soviet Union
- Height: 1.70 m (5 ft 7 in)
- Weight: 69 kg (152 lb)

Sport
- Sport: Weightlifting
- Event: 69 kg

Nizom Sangov (Tajik: Низом Сангов; born June 26, 1983, in Temurmalik, Khatlon) is a Tajikistani weightlifter. Sangov represented Tajikistan at the 2008 Summer Olympics in Beijing, where he competed in the men's lightweight category (69 kg). Sangov placed twenty-fourth in this event, as he successfully lifted 115 kg in the single-motion snatch, and hoisted 135 kg in the two-part, shoulder-to-overhead clean and jerk, for a total of 250 kg.
