= Muhamad Hasbi =

Indonesian weightlifter

Personal information
- Born: 12 July 1992 (age 33) Bekasi, West Java, Indonesia
- Height: 1.58 m (5 ft 2 in)
- Weight: 62 kg (137 lb)
Medal record
Men's Weightlifting
Representing Indonesia
Asian Championships
Silver medal – second place	2012 Pyeongtaek	– 62 kg
Southeast Asian Games
Silver medal – second place	2011 Jakarta-Palembang	– 62 kg

Muhamad Hasbi (born 12 July 1992) is an Indonesian weightlifter. He competed at the 2012 Summer Olympics in the Men's 62 kg, and also be competed at the 2016 Summer Olympics in the same category.
