= Ji Hun-min =

South Korean weightlifter

Ji Hun-Min (born March 26, 1984) is a South Korean weightlifter. He competed in the Men's Featherweight division at the 2008 Beijing Olympic Games. After placing second after the snatch lift, he failed to successfully lift in the clean and jerk, and hence was disqualified. The same thing happened at the 2012 Summer Olympics.
