= Ümürbek Bazarbaýew =

Turkmenistani weightlifter (born 1981)

Personal information
- Nationality: Turkmenistani
- Born: September 17, 1981 (age 45) Ýylanly, Dasoguz Province, Turkmen SSR, USSR
- Height: 1.65 m (5 ft 5 in)
- Weight: 62 kg (137 lb; 9.8 st)

Sport
- Country: Turkmenistan
- Sport: Weightlifting
Medal record
Men's Weightlifting
Representing Turkmenistan
Asian Championships
Bronze medal – third place	2008 Kanazawa	– 62 kg
Islamic Solidarity Games
Silver medal – second place	2005 Medina	– 62 kg

Umurbek Bazarbayev (born September 17, 1981, in Ýylanly, Dasoguz Province, Turkmenistan) is a Turkmenistani weightlifter. His personal best is 303 kg, achieved at the 2011 World Championships.

He ranked sixth in the 62 kg category at the 2004 Summer Olympics, with a total of 287.5 kg.

At the 2008 Asian Championships he won the overall bronze medal, with a total of 296 kg.

He competed in Weightlifting at the 2008 Summer Olympics in the 62 kg division but did not finish.

At the 2012 Summer Olympics, he again finished 6th, with a total of 302 kg.

He is 5 ft 4 inches tall and weighs 143 lb.
