= Le Maosheng =

Chinese weightlifter (born 1978)

Personal information
- Born: August 9, 1978 (age 47)
Medal record
Men's Weightlifting
Olympic Games
Silver medal – second place	2004 Athens	– 62 kg
World Championships
Gold medal – first place	1999 Athens	– 62 kg
Silver medal – second place	1997 Chiang Mai	– 59 kg
Silver medal – second place	2002 Warszawa	– 62 kg
Bronze medal – third place	2003 Vancouver	– 62 kg
Asian Games
Gold medal – first place	1998 Bangkok	– 62 kg
Gold medal – first place	2002 Busan	– 62 kg
Asian Championships
Silver medal – second place	2000 Osaka	– 62 kg
Silver medal – second place	2004 Almaty	– 62 kg

Le Maosheng (simplified Chinese: 乐茂盛; traditional Chinese: 樂茂盛; pinyin: Lè Màoshèng; born August 9, 1978, in Ningyuan, Yongzhou, Hunan) is a Chinese weightlifter who competed in the 2000 Summer Olympics and in the 2004 Summer Olympics.

In 2000 he finished fourth in the 62 kg class. Four years later he won the silver medal in the 62 kg class.

At the 2002 Asian Games he won with a world record clean and jerk of 182.5 kg, and a total of 322.5 kg.
