= List of British records in Olympic weightlifting =

The following are the national records in Olympic weightlifting in Great Britain. Records are maintained in each weight class for the snatch lift, clean and jerk lift, and the total for both lifts by British Weight Lifting (BWL).

== Current records ==
Key to tables: Awaiting ratification Not ratified or later rescinded by BWL

=== Men ===
Event	Record	Athlete	Date	Meet	Place	Ref
60 kg
Snatch	113 kg	Standard				
Clean & Jerk	139 kg	Standard				
Total	252 kg	Standard				
65 kg
Snatch	126 kg	Standard				
Clean & Jerk	154 kg	Standard				
Total	280 kg	Standard				
70 kg
Snatch	132 kg	Standard				
Clean & Jerk	168 kg	Standard				
Total	295 kg	Standard				
75 kg
Snatch	140 kg	Standard				
Snatch	142 kg	Chris Murray	30 October 2026	World Championships	Ningbo, China	
Clean & Jerk	172 kg	Standard				
Total	312 kg	Standard				
85 kg
Snatch	153 kg	Standard				
Clean & Jerk	186 kg	Standard				
Total	339 kg	Standard				
95 kg
Snatch	160 kg	Standard				
Clean & Jerk	197 kg	Standard				
Total	355 kg	Standard				
110 kg
Snatch	170 kg	Cyrille Tchatchet	6 November 2026	World Championships	Ningbo, China	
Clean & Jerk	208 kg	Cyrille Tchatchet	30 July 2026	Commonwealth Games	Glasgow, United Kingdom	
Total	374 kg	Cyrille Tchatchet	30 July 2026	Commonwealth Games	Glasgow, United Kingdom	
+110 kg
Snatch	165 kg	Andrew Griffiths	30 July 2026	Commonwealth Games	Glasgow, United Kingdom	
Clean & Jerk	203 kg	Jasper Hilton	3 October 2026	British Age Group Championships	Huddersfield, United Kingdom	
Total	365 kg	Standard				

=== Women ===
Event	Record	Athlete	Date	Meet	Place	Ref
49 kg
Snatch	78 kg	Standard				
Clean & Jerk	96 kg	Standard				
Total	174 kg	Standard				
53 kg
Snatch	87 kg	Standard				
Clean & Jerk	106 kg	Standard				
Total	193 kg	Standard				
57 kg
Snatch	95 kg	Standard				
Clean & Jerk	117 kg	Standard				
Total	212 kg	Standard				
61 kg
Snatch	97 kg	Standard				
Clean & Jerk	123 kg	Standard				
Total	216 kg	Standard				
69 kg
Snatch	103 kg	Sarah Davies	17 May 2026	British Championships	Telford, United Kingdom	
Clean & Jerk	127 kg	Sarah Davies	12 July 2025	British Championships	Birmingham, United Kingdom	
Total	228 kg	Sarah Davies	12 July 2025	British Championships	Birmingham, United Kingdom	
77 kg
Snatch	104 kg	Isabella Brown	27 June 2026	BWL Pathway Trials	Nottingham, United Kingdom	
Clean & Jerk	132 kg	Isabella Brown	29 July 2026	Commonwealth Games	Glasgow, United Kingdom	
Total	235 kg	Isabella Brown	27 June 2026	BWL Pathway Trials	Nottingham, United Kingdom	
86 kg
Snatch	113 kg	Madias Ngake	6 November 2026	World Championships	Ningbo, China	
Clean & Jerk	140 kg	Madias Ngake	6 November 2026	World Championships	Ningbo, China	
Total	253 kg	Madias Ngake	6 November 2026	World Championships	Ningbo, China	
+86 kg
Snatch	125 kg	Standard				
Clean & Jerk	163 kg	Standard				
Total	288 kg	Standard				

== Historical records ==
=== Men (2025–2026) ===
Event	Record	Athlete	Date	Meet	Place	Ref
71 kg
Snatch	133 kg	Standard				
Clean & Jerk	170 kg	Harrison McGrogan	21 April 2026	European Championships	Batumi, Georgia	
Total	298 kg	Harrison McGrogan	21 April 2026	European Championships	Batumi, Georgia	
Total	299 kg	Jonathan Chin	27 July 2026	Commonwealth Games	Glasgow, United Kingdom	
79 kg
Snatch	144 kg	Standard				
Snatch	148 kg	Chris Murray	27 July 2026	Commonwealth Games	Glasgow, United Kingdom	
Clean & Jerk	177 kg	Standard				
Total	321 kg	Standard				
Total	325 kg	Chris Murray	27 July 2026	Commonwealth Games	Glasgow, United Kingdom	
88 kg
Snatch	155 kg	Standard				
Clean & Jerk	189 kg	Standard				
Total	344 kg	Standard				
94 kg
Snatch	159 kg	Standard				
Clean & Jerk	196 kg	Ramiro Mora Romero	7 December 2025	England Championships	Birmingham, United Kingdom	
Total	354 kg	Standard				

=== Men (2018–2025) ===
Event	Record	Athlete	Date	Meet	Place	Ref
55 kg
Snatch	93 kg	Benjamin Hickling	30 July 2022	Commonwealth Games	Marston Green, United Kingdom	
Clean & Jerk	119 kg	Benjamin Hickling	30 July 2022	Commonwealth Games	Marston Green, United Kingdom	
Total	212 kg (Note: by official result source; 222 kg by BWL source, a typo)	Benjamin Hickling	30 July 2022	Commonwealth Games	Marston Green, United Kingdom	
61 kg
Snatch	105 kg	Standard				
Clean & Jerk	131 kg	Jaswant Shergill	19 January 2019	England Championships	Milton Keynes, United Kingdom	
Total	235 kg	Standard				
67 kg
Snatch	125 kg	Gareth Evans	8 April 2019	European Championships	Batumi, Georgia	
Clean & Jerk	161 kg	Gareth Evans	11 July 2019	Commonwealth Championships	Apia, Samoa	
Total	286 kg	Gareth Evans	11 July 2019	Commonwealth Championships	Apia, Samoa	
73 kg
Snatch	147 kg	Chris Murray	15 February 2024	European Championships	Sofia, Bulgaria	
Clean & Jerk	170 kg	Jonathan Chin	8 December 2023	England Championships	Birmingham, United Kingdom	
Total	300 kg	Jonathan Chin	8 December 2023	England Championships	Birmingham, United Kingdom	
81 kg
Snatch	148 kg	Chris Murray	9 December 2023	England Championships	Birmingham, United Kingdom	
Clean & Jerk	181 kg	Chris Murray	1 August 2022	Commonwealth Games	Marston Green, United Kingdom	
Total	325 kg	Chris Murray	1 August 2022	Commonwealth Games	Marston Green, United Kingdom	
89 kg
Snatch	155 kg	Ramiro Mora Romero	29 October 2022	England Championships	Derby, United Kingdom	
Clean & Jerk	191 kg	Ramiro Mora Romero	29 October 2022	England Championships	Derby, United Kingdom	
Total	346 kg	Ramiro Mora Romero	29 October 2022	England Championships	Derby, United Kingdom	
96 kg
Snatch	160 kg	Ramiro Mora Romero	6 August 2023	British Championships	Manchester, United Kingdom	
Clean & Jerk	201 kg	Ramiro Mora Romero	10 December 2023	England Championships	Birmingham, United Kingdom	
Total	357 kg	Ramiro Mora Romero	10 December 2023	England Championships	Birmingham, United Kingdom	
102 kg
Snatch	166 kg	Ramiro Mora Romero	10 August 2024	Olympic Games	Paris, France	
Clean & Jerk	210 kg	Ramiro Mora Romero	10 August 2024	Olympic Games	Paris, France	
Total	376 kg	Ramiro Mora Romero	10 August 2024	Olympic Games	Paris, France	
109 kg
Snatch	162 kg	Andrew Griffiths	10 December 2023	England Championships	Birmingham, United Kingdom	
Clean & Jerk	202 kg	Owen Boxall	3 November 2019	England Grand Prix	Milton Keynes, United Kingdom	
Total	362 kg	Owen Boxall	3 November 2019	England Grand Prix	Milton Keynes, United Kingdom	
+109 kg
Snatch	168 kg	Gordon Shaw	23 April 2023	European Championships	Yerevan, Armenia	
Snatch	169 kg	Gordon Shaw	5 June 2022	European Championships	Tirana, Albania	
Clean & Jerk	203 kg	Reza Rouhi	7 July 2024	British Championships	Birmingham, United Kingdom	
Total	365 kg	Reza Rouhi	7 July 2024	British Championships	Birmingham, United Kingdom	
Total	365 kg	Gordon Shaw	5 June 2022	European Championships	Tirana, Albania	

=== Men (1998–2018) ===
Event	Record	Athlete	Date	Meet	Place	Ref
-56 kg
Snatch	100 kg	Alan Ogilvie	10 July 1999	British Championships		
Clean & Jerk	124 kg	Mubarak Musoke	22 October 2011	British U23 Championships	Oldbury, Great Britain	
Total	220 kg	Alan Ogilvie	10 July 1999	British Championships		
-62 kg
Snatch	124 kg	Gareth Evans	27 June 2015	British Championships	Coventry, Great Britain	
Clean & Jerk	150 kg	Gareth Evans	25 July 2014	Commonwealth Games	Glasgow, Great Britain	
Total	269 kg	Gareth Evans	27 June 2015	British Championships	Coventry, Great Britain	
-69 kg
Snatch	136 kg	Gareth Evans	6 April 2018	Commonwealth Games	Gold Coast, Australia	
Clean & Jerk	165 kg	Stewart Cruickshank	31 July 2002	Commonwealth Games	Manchester, Great Britain	
Total	299 kg	Gareth Evans	6 April 2018	Commonwealth Games	Gold Coast, Australia	
-77 kg
Snatch	147 kg	Jack Oliver	28 June 2015	British Championships	Coventry, Great Britain	
Clean & Jerk	176 kg	Jack Oliver	23 November 2015	World Championships	Houston, United States	
Total	320 kg	Jack Oliver	14 April 2015	European Championships	Tbilisi, Georgia	
-85 kg
Snatch	158 kg	Bradley Burrowes	22 July 2007	South West Championships	Bristol, Great Britain	
Clean & Jerk	192,5 kg	Leon Griffin	18 September 1998	Commonwealth Games	Kuala Lumpur, Malaysia	
Total	347,5 kg	Leon Griffin	18 September 1998	Commonwealth Games	Kuala Lumpur, Malaysia	
-94 kg
Snatch	165,5 kg	Peter May				
Clean & Jerk	195 kg	David Guest	28 January 2001	UK Invitational Championships	Birmingham, Great Britain	
Total	355 kg	David Guest	28 January 2001	UK Invitational Championships	Birmingham, Great Britain	
-105 kg
Snatch	165 kg	Thomas Yule	27 April 2000	European Championships	Sofia, Bulgaria	
Clean & Jerk	210 kg	Delroy McQueen	2 August 2002	Commonwealth Games	Manchester, Great Britain	
Total	375 kg	Delroy McQueen	2 August 2002	Commonwealth Games	Manchester, Great Britain	
+105 kg
Snatch	180 kg	Giles Greenwood	3 August 2002	Commonwealth Games	Manchester, Great Britain	
Clean & Jerk	215 kg	Darius Jokarzadeh	10 May 2013	World Junior Championships	Lima, Peru	
Total	387,5 kg	Giles Greenwood	3 August 2002	Commonwealth Games	Manchester, Great Britain	

=== Women (2025–2026) ===
Event	Record	Athlete	Date	Meet	Place	Ref
48 kg
Snatch	77 kg	Standard				
Clean & Jerk	94 kg	Standard				
Total	171 kg	Standard				
58 kg
Snatch	96 kg	Standard				
Clean & Jerk	118 kg	Standard				
Total	214 kg	Standard				
63 kg
Snatch	99 kg	Standard				
Clean & Jerk	125 kg	Sarah Davies	21 April 2026	European Championships	Batumi, Georgia	
Total	220 kg	Standard				

=== Women (2018–2025) ===
Event	Record	Athlete	Date	Meet	Place	Ref
45 kg
Snatch	64 kg	Hannah Powell	2 March 2019	Welsh Championships	Bangor, United Kingdom	
Clean & Jerk	84 kg	Hannah Powell	9 July 2019	Commonwealth Championships	Apia, Samoa	
Total	148 kg	Hannah Powell	9 July 2019	Commonwealth Championships	Apia, Samoa	
49 kg
Snatch	77 kg	Fraer Morrow	5 September 2023	World Championships	Riyadh, Saudi Arabia	
Clean & Jerk	97 kg	Fraer Morrow	9 June 2023	IWF Grand Prix	Havana, Cuba	
Total	174 kg	Fraer Morrow	5 September 2023	World Championships	Riyadh, Saudi Arabia	
55 kg
Snatch	89 kg	Fraer Morrow	30 July 2022	Commonwealth Games	Marston Green, United Kingdom	
Clean & Jerk	109 kg	Fraer Morrow	26 June 2021	British Championships	Twickenham, United Kingdom	
Total	198 kg	Fraer Morrow	30 July 2022	Commonwealth Games	Marston Green, United Kingdom	
59 kg
Snatch	93 kg	Zoe Smith	21 September 2019	World Championships	Pattaya, Thailand	
Clean & Jerk	123 kg	Zoe Smith	21 September 2019	World Championships	Pattaya, Thailand	
Total	216 kg	Zoe Smith	21 September 2019	World Championships	Pattaya, Thailand	
64 kg
Snatch	101 kg	Sarah Davies	8 June 2019	British International Open	Coventry, United Kingdom	
Clean & Jerk	129 kg	Sarah Davies	6 April 2021	European Championships	Moscow, Russia	
Total	230 kg	Sarah Davies	6 April 2021	European Championships	Moscow, Russia	
71 kg
Snatch	103 kg	Sarah Davies	1 August 2022	Commonwealth Games	Marston Green, United Kingdom	
Clean & Jerk	132 kg	Sarah Davies	13 December 2021	World Championships	Tashkent, Uzbekistan	
Total	234 kg	Sarah Davies	13 December 2021	World Championships	Tashkent, Uzbekistan	
76 kg
Snatch	102 kg	Sarah Davies	29 October 2022	England Championships	Derby, United Kingdom	
Clean & Jerk	127 kg	Emily Godley	11 July 2019	Commonwealth Championships	Apia, Samoa	
Total	226 kg	Sarah Davies	29 October 2022	England Championships	Derby, United Kingdom	
81 kg
Snatch	102 kg	Katrina Feklistova	9 April 2024 (Note: by official result source; 31 March 2024 by BWL source, a typo)	World Cup	Phuket, Thailand	
Clean & Jerk	127 kg	Katrina Feklistova	9 April 2024 (Note: by official result source; 31 March 2024 by BWL source, a typo)	World Cup	Phuket, Thailand	
Total	229 kg	Katrina Feklistova	9 April 2024 (Note: by official result source; 31 March 2024 by BWL source, a typo)	World Cup	Phuket, Thailand	
87 kg
Snatch	113 kg	Madias Dodo Nzesso-Ngake	10 December 2023	England Championships	Birmingham, United Kingdom	
Clean & Jerk	132 kg	Madias Dodo Nzesso-Ngake	21 September 2024	Commonwealth Championships	Suva, Fiji	
Total	246 kg	Madias Dodo Nzesso-Ngake	7 July 2024	British Championships	Birmingham, United Kingdom	
+87 kg
Snatch	126 kg	Emily Campbell	11 August 2024	Olympic Games	Paris, France	
Clean & Jerk	165 kg	Emily Campbell	15 December 2022	World Championships	Bogotá, Colombia	
Total	288 kg	Emily Campbell	11 August 2024	Olympic Games	Paris, France	

=== Women (1998–2018) ===
Event	Record	Athlete	Date	Meet	Place	Ref
-48 kg
Snatch	67 kg	Hannah Powell	8 March 2015	Welsh National Championships	Cardiff, Great Britain	
Clean & Jerk	88 kg	Joanne Calvino	26 November 2011			
Total	153 kg	Joanne Calvino	26 November 2011			
-53 kg
Snatch	78 kg	Jennifer Tong	21 April 2018	British University Championships	Twickenham, Great Britain	
Clean & Jerk	99 kg	Fraer Morrow	6 April 2018	Commonwealth Games	Gold Coast, Australia	
Total	172 kg	Fraer Morrow	6 April 2018	Commonwealth Games	Gold Coast, Australia	
-58 kg
Snatch	94 kg	Michaela Breeze	29 May 2014	International Women Grand Prix	Speyer, Germany	
Clean & Jerk	121 kg	Zoe Smith	30 July 2012	Olympic Games	London, Great Britain	
Total	212.5 kg	Michaela Breeze	21 April 2004	European Championships	Kyiv, Ukraine	
-63 kg
Snatch	100 kg	Michaela Breeze	18 March 2006	Commonwealth Games	Melbourne, Australia	
Clean & Jerk	124 kg	Zoe Smith	25 November 2015	World Championships	Houston, United States	
Total	221 kg	Zoe Smith	25 November 2015	World Championships	Houston, United States	
-69 kg
Snatch	102 kg	Rebekah Tiler	11 June 2016	British Championships	Coventry, Great Britain	
Clean & Jerk	126 kg	Rebekah Tiler	24 October 2015	Northern Open	Mytholmroyd, Great Britain	
Total	227 kg	Rebekah Tiler	11 June 2016	British Championships	Coventry, Great Britain	
-75 kg
Snatch	96 kg	Emily Godley	8 April 2018	Commonwealth Games	Gold Coast, Australia	
Clean & Jerk	126 kg	Emily Godley	8 April 2018	Commonwealth Games	Gold Coast, Australia	
Total	222 kg	Emily Godley	8 April 2018	Commonwealth Games	Gold Coast, Australia	
-90 kg
Snatch	97 kg	Mercy Brown	7 July 2018	British Championships	Coventry, Great Britain	
Clean & Jerk	124 kg	Mercy Brown	7 July 2018	British Championships	Coventry, Great Britain	
Total	221 kg	Mercy Brown	7 July 2018	British Championships	Coventry, Great Britain	
+90 kg
Snatch	107 kg	Emily Campbell	7 July 2018	British Championships	Coventry, Great Britain	
Clean & Jerk	139 kg	Emily Campbell	9 April 2018	Commonwealth Games	Gold Coast, Australia	
Total	242 kg	Emily Campbell	9 April 2018	Commonwealth Games	Gold Coast, Australia	
