= Weightlifting at the 2022 Commonwealth Games – Qualification =

There was a nominal total of 180 quota places available for weightlifting at the 2022 Commonwealth Games; 90 each for men and women.

== Rules ==
Each Commonwealth Games Association (CGA) is restricted to one entry per weight category, which equates to a maximum quota of sixteen qualified weightlifters. Each qualified weightlifter may contest one category only.

- As the host CGA, England is guaranteed one quota place in all sixteen weight categories.
- Gold medallists in eligible categories at the 2021 Commonwealth Weightlifting Championships earned one place each.
- Eight or nine places per category are determined by the IWF Commonwealth Ranking List (as of 28 February 2022).
- The last place in each category is determined by a CGF/IWF Bipartite Invitation.

== Timeline ==
Event	Dates	Location
2021 Commonwealth Weightlifting Championships	7–17 December 2021	Tashkent, Uzbekistan
IWF Commonwealth Ranking List	1 January 2021 – 28 February 2022	Various locations

== Summary ==
CGA	Men								Women								Total
CGA	55	61	67	73	81	96	109	+109	49	55	59	64	71	76	87	+87	Total
Australia				Yes	Yes	Yes	Yes	Yes			Yes	Yes	Yes	Yes	Yes	Yes	11
Bangladesh	Yes								Yes			Yes		Yes			4
Botswana	Yes																1
Brunei		Yes															1
Cameroon					Yes	Yes	Yes							Yes	Yes		5
Canada		Yes		Yes	Yes	Yes	Yes	Yes	Yes	Yes	Yes	Yes	Yes	Yes	Yes	Yes	14
Cook Islands																Yes	1
Cyprus						Yes											1
England	Yes		Yes	Yes	Yes	Yes	Yes	Yes	Yes	Yes	Yes	Yes	Yes	Yes	Yes	Yes	15
Fiji						Yes										Yes	2
Ghana						Yes			Yes								2
Gibraltar													Yes				1
India	Yes	Yes	Yes	Yes	Yes	Yes	Yes	Yes	Yes	Yes	Yes		Yes	Yes	Yes	Yes	15
Jamaica					Yes					Yes				Yes	Yes		4
Kenya	Yes			Yes								Yes					3
Kiribati			Yes														1
Lesotho		Yes															1
Malaysia	Yes	Yes		Yes	Yes		Yes			Yes	Yes						7
Malta											Yes	Yes	Yes			Yes	4
Mauritius	Yes		Yes			Yes			Yes				Yes			Yes	6
Nauru		Yes	Yes	Yes						Yes		Yes	Yes	Yes			7
New Zealand				Yes	Yes		Yes	Yes				Yes	Yes		Yes		7
Nigeria		Yes	Yes						Yes	Yes	Yes	Yes	Yes	Yes	Yes		9
Niue								Yes									1
Northern Ireland											Yes	Yes					2
Pakistan					Yes		Yes	Yes									3
Papua New Guinea		Yes							Yes								2
Samoa			Yes	Yes		Yes	Yes	Yes								Yes	6
Scotland			Yes		Yes					Yes			Yes	Yes			5
Seychelles											Yes				Yes		2
Singapore	Yes		Yes		Yes				Yes		Yes	Yes					6
Solomon Islands	Yes									Yes							2
Sri Lanka	Yes	Yes	Yes	Yes	Yes			Yes	Yes	Yes					Yes	Yes	10
South Africa				Yes		Yes		Yes			Yes						4
Tonga							Yes									Yes	2
Uganda	Yes	Yes						Yes									3
Vanuatu															Yes		1
Wales				Yes			Yes		Yes	Yes		Yes	Yes	Yes			7
TOTAL: 38 CGAs	11	10	10	12	12	11	11	11	11	11	11	12	12	11	11	11	178

== Men's events ==
=== 55 kg ===
Means of qualification	Quotas	Qualified
Host Nation	1	Ben Hickling (ENG)
2021 Commonwealth Championships	1	Aniq Kasdan (MAS)
IWF Commonwealth Rankings	8	Sanket Sargar (IND); ~~Sharjeel Butt (PAK)~~ (Note: Removed from the list following his suspension for an anti-doping whereabouts violation.); Dilanka Isuru Kumara (SRI); Davis Niyoyita (UGA); Ashikur Rahman Taj (BAN); David Mok Pingwei (SGP); Kgotla Kgaswane (BOT); Benjamin Ochoma (KEN); Willem Emile (MRI)
Bipartite Invitation	1	Philip Masi (SOL)
TOTAL	11	

=== 61 kg ===
Means of qualification	Quotas	Qualified
Host Nation	0	
2021 Commonwealth Championships	1	Aznil Bidin (MAS)
IWF Commonwealth Rankings	8	Morea Baru (PNG); Gururaja Poojary (IND); Thilanka Palangasinghe (SRI); Emmanuel Appah (NGR); Youri Simard (CAN); ~~Abubakar Ghani (PAK)~~ (Note: Removed from the list following his suspension for failing an anti-doping test.); Davis Niyoyita (UGA) (Note: Selected a different weight category in which they also qualified.); Nashrul Abu Bakar (BRU); ~~Ben Foggo (WAL)~~ (Note: Quota place not accepted by their CGA.); Shadrack Cain (NRU); Mubarak Kivumbi (UGA)
Bipartite Invitation	1	Thapelo Sebota (LES)
TOTAL	10	

=== 67 kg ===
Means of qualification	Quotas	Qualified
Host Nation	1	Jaswant Shergill (ENG)
2021 Commonwealth Championships	1	Jeremy Lalrinnunga (IND)
IWF Commonwealth Rankings	7	~~Talha Talib (PAK)~~; Edidiong Joseph Umoafia (NGR); Vaipava Ioane (SAM); Chaturanga Lakmal (SRI); Craig Carfray (SCO); Ruben Katoatau (KIR); Kester Loy (SGP); Ditto Ika (NRU)
Bipartite Invitation	1	Marc Jonathan Coret (MRI)
TOTAL	10	

=== 73 kg ===
Means of qualification	Quotas	Qualified
Host Nation	1	Jack Oliver (ENG)
2021 Commonwealth Championships	1	Achinta Sheuli (IND)
IWF Commonwealth Rankings	9	Erry Hidayat (MAS); John Tafi (SAM); Shad Darsigny (CAN); Brandon Wakeling (AUS); Vester Villalon (NZL); Ezekiel Moses (NRU); Indika Dissanayake (SRI); Michael Farmer (WAL); Jon-Antohein Phillips (RSA)
Bipartite Invitation	1	Anthony Libasia (KEN)
TOTAL	12	

=== 81 kg ===
Means of qualification	Quotas	Qualified
Host Nation	1	Chris Murray (ENG)
2021 Commonwealth Championships	1	Ajay Singh (IND)
IWF Commonwealth Rankings	9	Nicolas Vachon (CAN); Kyle Bruce (AUS); Cameron McTaggart (NZL); Haider Ali (PAK); Michel Ngongang (CMR); Chinthana Vidanage (SRI); Nasir Roslan (MAS); Jason Epton (SCO); Lim Kang Yin (SGP)
Bipartite Invitation	1	Omarie Mears (JAM)
TOTAL	12	

=== 96 kg ===
Means of qualification	Quotas	Qualified
Host Nation	1	Cyrille Tchatchet (ENG)
2021 Commonwealth Championships	1	Boady Santavy (CAN)
IWF Commonwealth Rankings	8	Don Opeloge (SAM); Antonis Martasidis (CYP); Vikas Thakur (IND); Ridge Barredo (AUS); Forrester Osei (GHA); Cédric Coret (MRI); Denis Essama Owona (CMR); Ruben Burger (RSA)
Bipartite Invitation	1	Taniela Rainibogi (FIJ)
TOTAL	11	

=== 109 kg ===
Means of qualification	Quotas	Qualified
Host Nation	1	Andrew Griffiths (ENG)
2021 Commonwealth Championships	1	Junior Ngadja Nyabeyeu (CMR)
IWF Commonwealth Rankings	8	Jack Opeloge (SAM); Lovepreet Singh (IND); Pierre-Alexandre Besette (CAN); Jackson Roberts-Young (AUS); Hafiz Shamsuddin (MAS); Koale Junior Tasi Taala (NZL); Jordan Sakkas (WAL); Hanzala Dastigir Butt (PAK)
Bipartite Invitation	1	Sio Pomelile (TGA)
TOTAL	11	

=== +109 kg ===
Means of qualification	Quotas	Qualified
Host Nation	1	Gordon Shaw (ENG)
2021 Commonwealth Championships	1	David Liti (NZL)
IWF Commonwealth Rankings	8	Nooh Dastgir Butt (PAK); Gurdeep Singh (IND); Quinn Everett (CAN); Suamili Nanai (AUS); Petelo Lautusi (SAM); Ushan Charuka (SRI); ~~Joseph Walton (WAL)~~; Nathan Morris (RSA); Godfrey Baligeya (UGA)
Bipartite Invitation	1	Giovanni Toimata (NIU)
TOTAL	11	

== Women's events ==
=== 49 kg ===
Means of qualification	Quotas	Qualified
Host Nation	1	Noorin Gulam (ENG)
2021 Commonwealth Championships	1	Stella Kingsley (NGR)
IWF Commonwealth Rankings	8	Saikhom Mirabai Chanu (IND); Dika Toua (PNG); Roilya Ranaivosoa (MRI); Hannah Kaminski (CAN); Tenishia Thornton (MLT); Hannah Powell (WAL); Srimali Samarakoon (SRI); ~~Lisa Tobias (SCO)~~; Winnifred Ntumi (GHA); Marja Akter Ekra (BAN)
Bipartite Invitation	1	Chan Ying Ying (SGP)
TOTAL	11	

=== 55 kg ===
Means of qualification	Quotas	Qualified
Host Nation	1	Fraer Morrow (ENG)
2021 Commonwealth Championships	1	Adijat Olarinoye (NGR)
IWF Commonwealth Rankings	8	Bindyarani Devi (IND); Catrin Jones (WAL); Jenly Tegu Wini (SOL); Rachel Leblanc-Bazinet (CAN); ~~Jessica Sewastenko (AUS)~~; Jodey Hughes (SCO); Elly Cascandra Englebert (MAS); Tenishia Thornton (MLT); Chamari Warnakulasuriya (SRI); My-Only Stephen (NRU)
Bipartite Invitation	1	Sky Norris (JAM)
TOTAL	11	

=== 59 kg ===
Means of qualification	Quotas	Qualified
Host Nation	1	Jessica Gordon-Brown (ENG)
2021 Commonwealth Championships	1	Rafiatu Folashade Lawal (NGR)
IWF Commonwealth Rankings	8	Tali Darsigny (CAN); Bindyarani Devi (IND); Brenna Kean (AUS); Popy Hazarika (IND); Clementina Agricole (SEY); Hannah Crymle (NIR); Anneke Spies (RSA); Marcetta Marlyne Marcus (MAS); Tenishia Thornton (MLT)
Bipartite Invitation	1	Sarah Ang (SGP)
TOTAL	11	

=== 64 kg ===
Means of qualification	Quotas	Qualified
Host Nation	1	Zoe Smith (ENG)
2021 Commonwealth Championships	1	Sarah Cochrane (AUS)
IWF Commonwealth Rankings	9	Maude Charron (CAN); Islamiyat Yusuf (NGR); Popy Hazarika (IND); Emma McIntyre (NZL); Yasmin Zammit Stevens (MLT); Christie-Marie Williams (WAL); Caroline Doyle (NIR); Mabia Akter (BAN); ~~Lesley Brown (SCO)~~; Nicole Heng (SGP); Bernice Detudamo (NRU); ~~Arshika Vijayabaskar (SRI)~~
Bipartite Invitation	1	Rachael Achieng (KEN)
TOTAL	12	

=== 71 kg ===
Means of qualification	Quotas	Qualified
Host Nation	1	Sarah Davies (ENG)
2021 Commonwealth Championships	1	Joy Ogbonne Eze (NGR)
IWF Commonwealth Rankings	9	Kiana Elliott (AUS); Alexis Ashworth (CAN); Harjinder Kaur (IND); Faye Pittman (WAL); Nancy Genzel Abouke (NRU); Megan Signal (NZL); Yasmin Zammit Stevens (MLT); Alice Aitchison (SCO); Roberta Tabone (MLT); Ketty Lent (MRI)
Bipartite Invitation	1	Holly O'Shea (GIB)
TOTAL	12	

=== 76 kg ===
Means of qualification	Quotas	Qualified
Host Nation	1	Deborah Alawode (ENG)
2021 Commonwealth Championships	1	Maya Laylor (CAN)
IWF Commonwealth Rankings	8	Punam Yadav (IND); Jeanne Gaëlle Eyenga (CMR); Liadi Taiwo (NGR); Ebony Gorincu (AUS); Nancy Genzel Abouke (NRU); Agata Herbert (SCO); Amy Salt (WAL); ~~Renee Baarspul (NZL)~~; Maximina Uepa (NRU); ~~Niamh Menary (NIR)~~; Monira Kazi (BAN)
Bipartite Invitation	1	Chloe Whylie (JAM)
TOTAL	11	

=== 87 kg ===
Means of qualification	Quotas	Qualified
Host Nation	1	Emily Sweeney (ENG)
2021 Commonwealth Championships	1	Kristel Ngarlem (CAN)
IWF Commonwealth Rankings	8	Eileen Cikamatana (AUS); Clementine Meukeugni (CMR); Hayley Whiting (NZL); Mary Osijo (NGR); Bannur Natesh Usha (IND); Chathurika Priyanthi (SRI); Sientje Henderson (JAM); ~~Imoasina Pelenato (SAM)~~; Romantha Larue (SEY)
Bipartite Invitation	1	Ajah Pritchard-Lolo (VAN)
TOTAL	11	

=== +87 kg ===
Means of qualification	Quotas	Qualified
Host Nation	1	Emily Campbell (ENG)
2021 Commonwealth Championships	1	Purnima Pandey (IND)
IWF Commonwealth Rankings	8	Feagaiga Stowers (SAM); Charisma Amoe-Tarrant (AUS); Kuinini Manumua (TGA); Emma Friesen (CAN); Manine Lynch (COK); ~~Miniah Summerell (NZL)~~; Trimalee Haputenne (SRI); Helen Seipua (FIJ); ~~Rebecca Gilbert (NIR)~~; Alison Sunee (MRI)
Bipartite Invitation	1	Elisia Scicluna (MLT)
TOTAL	11	
