= Weightlifting at the 2022 Commonwealth Games =

- Venue: National Exhibition Centre
- Location: Birmingham, England
- Dates: 30 July to 3 August 2022
- Competitors: 174 from 37 nations

Weightlifting at the 2022 Commonwealth Games was the 19th appearance of Weightlifting at the Commonwealth Games. The weightlifting events at the 2022 Commonwealth Games were held in Birmingham, England. This was the nineteenth edition since its inclusion in 1950, and the second staging within England specifically.

The competition took place between 30 July and 3 August 2022, spread across sixteen weight classes (eight per gender).

== Schedule ==
The competition schedule is as follows:

Date Event	Sat 30	Sun 31	Mon 1	Tue 2	Wed 3
Men's
55 kg	F				
61 kg	F				
67 kg		F			
73 kg		F			
81 kg			F		
96 kg				F	
109 kg					F
+109 kg					F
Women's
49 kg	F				
55 kg	F				
59 kg		F			
64 kg			F		
71 kg			F		
76 kg				F	
87 kg				F	
+87 kg					F

== Venue ==
The weightlifting competitions were held at the National Exhibition Centre in Solihull. Competitions for five other sports – badminton, boxing, netball, para powerlifting and table tennis – also take place there.

== Qualification ==
A total of 180 weightlifters (90 per gender) qualify to compete at the Games. Nations may earn one quota per weight class, allocated as follows:

- The host nation.
- The 2021 Commonwealth champion.
- Athletes on the IWF Commonwealth Ranking List as of 28 February 2022.
- Recipient of a CGF/IWF Bipartite Invitation.

== Medal summary ==
=== Medal table ===
* Host nation (England)

Rank	CGA	Gold	Silver	Bronze	Total
1	India	3	3	4	10
2	England*	3	1	1	5
3	Canada	2	2	4	8
4	Nigeria	2	1	3	6
5	Malaysia	2	1	0	3
6	Samoa	1	3	0	4
7	Australia	1	2	1	4
8	Cameroon	1	0	0	1
8	Pakistan	1	0	0	1
10	Mauritius	0	1	0	1
10	New Zealand	0	1	0	1
10	Papua New Guinea	0	1	0	1
13	Fiji	0	0	1	1
13	Nauru	0	0	1	1
13	Sri Lanka	0	0	1	1
Totals (15 entries)		16	16	16	48

=== Medalists ===
==== Men's events ====
Event	Gold		Silver		Bronze	
55 kg	Aniq Kasdan; Malaysia	249 kg	Sanket Mahadev Sargar; India	248 kg	Dilanka Isuru Kumara; Sri Lanka	225 kg
61 kg	Muhamad Aznil Bidin; Malaysia	285 kg GR	Morea Baru; Papua New Guinea	273 kg	Gururaja Poojary; India	269 kg
67 kg	Jeremy Lalrinnunga; India	300 kg GR	Vaipava Nevo Ioane; Samoa	293 kg	Edidiong Joseph Umoafia; Nigeria	290 kg
73 kg	Achinta Sheuli; India	313 kg GR	Muhammad Erry Hidayat; Malaysia	303 kg	Shad Darsigny; Canada	298 kg
81 kg	Chris Murray; England	325 kg GR	Kyle Bruce; Australia	323 kg	Nicolas Vachon; Canada	320 kg
96 kg	Don Opeloge; Samoa	381 kg GR	Vikas Thakur; India	346 kg	Taniela Rainibogi; Fiji	343 kg
109 kg	Junior Ngadja Nyabeyeu; Cameroon	361 kg	Jack Opeloge; Samoa	358 kg	Lovepreet Singh; India	355 kg
+109 kg	Nooh Dastgir Butt; Pakistan	405 kg GR	David Liti; New Zealand	394 kg	Gurdeep Singh; India	390 kg

==== Women's events ====
Event	Gold		Silver		Bronze	
49 kg	Saikhom Mirabai Chanu; India	201 kg GR	Roilya Ranaivosoa; Mauritius	172 kg	Hannah Kaminski; Canada	171 kg
55 kg	Adijat Olarinoye; Nigeria	203 kg GR	Bindyarani Sorokhaibam; India	202 kg	Fraer Morrow; England	198 kg
59 kg	Rafiatu Lawal; Nigeria	206 kg GR	Jessica Gordon Brown; England	197 kg	Tali Darsigny; Canada	196 kg
64 kg	Maude Charron; Canada	231 kg GR	Sarah Cochrane; Australia	216 kg	Islamiyat Yusuf; Nigeria	212 kg
71 kg	Sarah Davies; England	229 kg GR	Alexis Ashworth; Canada	214 kg	Harjinder Kaur; India	212 kg
76 kg	Maya Laylor; Canada	228 kg GR	Taiwo Liadi; Nigeria	216 kg JCR	Maximina Uepa; Nauru	215 kg
87 kg	Eileen Cikamatana; Australia	255 kg GR	Kristel Ngarlem; Canada	236 kg	Mary Osijo; Nigeria	225 kg
+87 kg	Emily Campbell; England	286 kg GR CR	Feagaiga Stowers; Samoa	268 kg	Charisma Amoe Tarrant; Australia	239 kg

== Participating nations ==
There were 37 participating Commonwealth Games Associations (CGA's) in weightlifting with a total of 174 (90 men and 84 women) athletes. The number of athletes a nation entered is in parentheses beside the name of the country.

- Australia (11)
- Bangladesh (4)
- Botswana (2)
- Brunei (1)
- Cameroon (5)
- Canada (14)
- Cook Islands (1)
- Cyprus (1)
- England (15)
- Fiji (2)
- Ghana (2)
- Gibraltar (1)
- India (15)
- Jamaica (4)
- Kenya (3)
- Kiribati (1)
- Lesotho (1)
- Malaysia (7)
- Malta (4)
- Mauritius (6)
- Nauru (7)
- New Zealand (7)
- Nigeria (9)
- Northern Ireland (2)
- Pakistan (3)
- Papua New Guinea (2)
- Samoa (6)
- Scotland (4)
- Seychelles (2)
- Singapore (6)
- Solomon Islands (2)
- South Africa (4)
- Sri Lanka (10)
- Tonga (2)
- Uganda (1)
- Vanuatu (1)
- Wales (7)
