= 2016 Commonwealth Weightlifting Championships =

- Host city: Bayan Baru, Malaysia
- Dates: 25–29 October 2016
- Main venue: SPICE Arena

The 2016 Commonwealth Weightlifting Championships were held at the SPICE Arena in Bayan Baru, Penang, Malaysia from 25 to 29 October 2016.

The event was limited to seniors and juniors. At the same venue, youth weightlifters instead contested the preceding World Youth Weightlifting Championships, where they were awarded Commonwealth medals (if desired, their results also featured in the subsequent junior/senior standings).

Results shown below are for the senior competition only. Junior and youth results are cited here and here respectively.

== Medal table ==
* Host nation (Malaysia)

Rank	Nation	Gold	Silver	Bronze	Total
1	India	4	1	2	7
2	Malaysia*	2	3	3	8
3	Australia	2	3	2	7
4	England	2	0	0	2
5	Fiji	1	1	2	4
6	Ghana	1	0	0	1
6	Papua New Guinea	1	0	0	1
6	Samoa	1	0	0	1
6	South Africa	1	0	0	1
10	New Zealand	0	2	2	4
11	Sri Lanka	0	2	1	3
12	Mauritius	0	1	1	2
12	Wales	0	1	1	2
14	Kiribati	0	1	0	1
15	Pakistan	0	0	1	1
Totals (15 entries)		15	15	15	45

== Medal summary ==
=== Men ===
Event	Gold		Silver		Bronze	
56 kg	Gururaja; India	249 kg	Azroy Hazalwafie; Malaysia	239 kg	Manueli Tulo; Fiji	235 kg
62 kg	Mohd Zaidi Nordin; Malaysia	261 kg	Thilanka Palangasinghe; Sri Lanka	259 kg	Anbarasu Gopal; India	259 kg
69 kg	Mohd Hafifi Mansor; Malaysia	302 kg	Sudesh Peiris; Sri Lanka	288 kg	Gareth Evans; Wales	287 kg
77 kg	Ajay Singh; India	318 kg	Loro Wellkinson Peuji; Malaysia	312 kg	Mohamad Fazrul Azrie; Malaysia	308 kg
85 kg	Kojum Taba; India	330 kg	Richie Patterson; New Zealand	318 kg	François Etoundi; Australia	302 kg
94 kg	Forrester Osei; Ghana	310 kg	Shivam Saini; India	300 kg	Ben Shaw; Australia	300 kg
105 kg	Owen Boxall; England	353 kg	David Katoatau; Kiribati	343 kg	Andrius Barakauskas; New Zealand	318 kg
+105 kg	Damon Kelly; Australia	373 kg	David Liti; New Zealand	369 kg	Nooh Dastgir Butt; Pakistan	369 kg

=== Women ===
Event	Gold		Silver		Bronze	
48 kg	Thelma Toua; Papua New Guinea	156 kg	Hannah Powell; Wales	149 kg	Dinusha Gomes; Sri Lanka	148 kg
53 kg	Joti Mal; India	175 kg	Roilya Ranaivosoa; Mauritius	174 kg	Phillipa Patterson; New Zealand	163 kg
58 kg	Erika Yamasaki; Australia	174 kg	Marceeta Marcus; Malaysia	154 kg	Ulina Sagone; Fiji	153 kg
63 kg	Mona Pretorius; South Africa	194 kg	Seen Lee; Australia	188 kg	Frenceay Titus; Malaysia	182 kg
69 kg	Rebekah Tiler; England	217 kg	Eileen Cikamatana; Fiji	215 kg	Rakhi Halder; India	202 kg
75 kg	Apolonia Vaivai; Fiji	208 kg	Kylie Lindbeck; Australia	199 kg	Jabriella Teo Samuel; Malaysia	179 kg
+75 kg	Iuniarra Sipaia; Samoa	243 kg	Kaity Fassina; Australia	229 kg	Shalinee Valaydon; Mauritius	213 kg
