= Rebekah Tiler =

British weightlifter

Personal information
- Full name: Rebekah Jade Tiler
- Born: January 13, 1999 (age 27)
- Height: 1.63 m (5 ft 4 in)
- Weight: 69 kg (152 lb)

Sport
- Country: United Kingdom
- Sport: Weightlifting
- Event: Women's 69 kg
Medal record
Women's weightlifting
Representing Great Britain
European Championships
Bronze medal – third place	2016 Førde	69 kg
Representing England
Commonwealth Championships
Gold medal – first place	2016 Penang	69 kg

Rebekah Tiler (born 13 January 1999) is a former British weightlifter, who (as of April 2018) holds all three British Records in the 69 kg class. She competed at the 2014 Commonwealth Games in Glasgow where she finished fourth. She was the UK's only woman weightlifter at the 2016 Olympics. She has three younger sisters: Lisa, Emily and Sophie. In 2020 she switched to Powerlifting and broke the British Record on the Squat in the 84 kg class.

== Major results ==
Year	Venue	Weight	Snatch (kg)				Clean & Jerk (kg)				Total	Rank
Year	Venue	Weight	1	2	3	Rank	1	2	3	Rank	Total	Rank
Representing Great Britain
Olympic Games
2016	Rio de Janeiro, Brazil	69 kg	98	~~101~~	101	10	122	~~126~~	126	10	227	10
World Championships
2015	Houston, United States	63 kg	~~93~~	93	~~96~~	17	118	~~121~~	~~122~~	13	211	13
European Championships
2017	Split, Croatia	69 kg	93	96	100	2nd place, silver medalist(s)	120	~~124~~	124	4	224	4
2016	Førde, Norway	69 kg	95	~~98~~	99	3rd place, bronze medalist(s)	120	123	~~126~~	3rd place, bronze medalist(s)	222	3rd place, bronze medalist(s)
Representing England
Commonwealth Games
2014	Glasgow, United Kingdom	69 kg	~~91~~	91	~~95~~	4	118	~~123~~	~~123~~	3	209	4
