= Zoe Smith =

English weightlifter (born 1994)

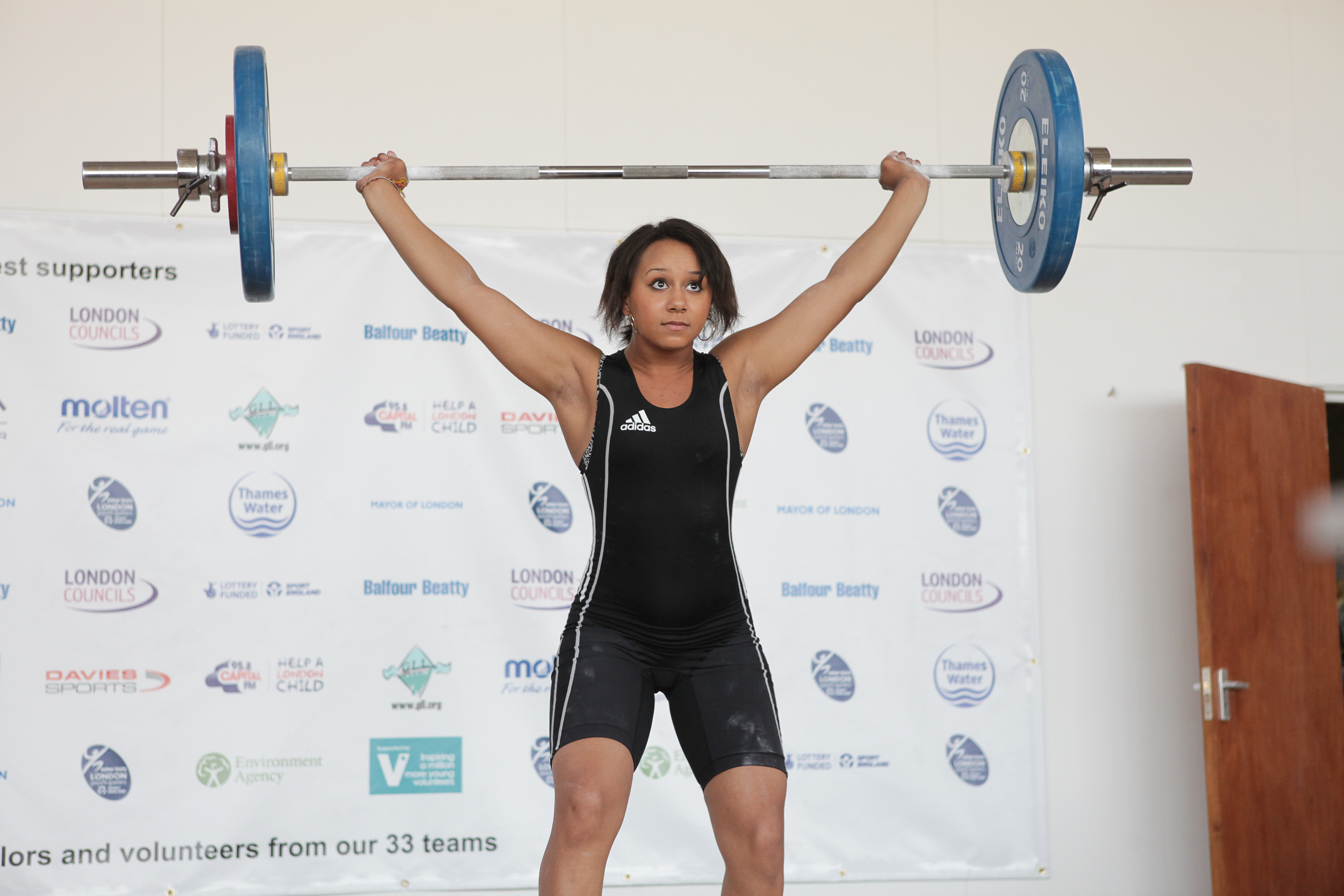
- Zoe Smith at the London Youth Games in 2011

Personal information
- Born: 26 April 1994 (age 32) Greenwich, London, England
- Height: 1.59 m (5 ft 2 1/2 in)
- Weight: 58.06 kg (128.0 lb) (in March 2024)

Sport
- Country: United Kingdom
- Sport: Weightlifting
- Events: –58kg, −59kg, −63kg, −64kg
- Club: East London Weightlifting

Achievements and titles
- Personal best: 225kg
Medal record
Women's weightlifting
Representing Great Britain
European Championship
Bronze medal – third place	2014 Tel Aviv	−58 kg
Bronze medal – third place	2019 Batumi	–64 kg
Bronze medal – third place	2023 Yerevan	–64 kg
Representing England
Commonwealth Games
Gold medal – first place	2014 Glasgow	58 kg
Silver medal – second place	2018 Gold Coast	63 kg
Bronze medal – third place	2010 Delhi	58 kg
- Updated on 8 August 2024

Zoe Smith (born 26 April 1994) is an English weightlifter. In October 2010, she won a bronze medal in the women's 58 kg division at the 2010 Commonwealth Games in Delhi, India, her first senior international competition, to become the first English woman to win a Commonwealth Games weightlifting medal. Smith competed at the 2012 Summer Olympics in London and finished 12th in the Women's 58 kg division. After missing the 2016 Summer Olympics following an injury, she finished eighth in the 59 kg at the 2020 Summer Olympics. At the 2023 European Weightlifting Championships she won the gold in clean and jerk and the bronze in the 64 kg total category. She failed to qualify for the 2024 Summer Olympics.

Smith took up weightlifting aged 12, when she was at a gym training as a gymnast and was invited to try lifting; she subsequently represented her borough at the London Youth Games. A few months after her victory at the 2010 Commonwealth Games, her funding was withdrawn as she was deemed to be insufficiently committed to the sport, but was restored a couple of months later. By 2018, a shoulder injury, the end of centralised funding for weightlifting in the UK, and the loss of her sponsorship, led to Smith moving back in with her parents and taking a job as a barista. Smith coaches at a gym in East London.

== Early life ==
Zoe Smith was born on 26 April 1994 to Nikki Smith, an administrator at the Department of Health and Terry Smith, a window cleaner. She attended De Lucy Primary School in Abbey Wood and Townley Grammar School for Girls in Bexleyheath. In 2005, aged 12, Smith was training at a local gym as a gymnast. Andrew Callard, who was forming a team for the London Youth Games, was in the building and was seeking female competitors for weightlifting at the competition. Smith and some of the other gymnasts tried squats, and, according to Callard, her potential as a weightlifter was immediately obvious. She took up weightlifting and represented her borough, Greenwich, at the London Youth Games.

== Career ==
=== Early career ===
Smith won the South East County Championships, her first major competition. She was selected for the 2008 Commonwealth Youth Games, at which she was the youngest member of the English team, and won the gold medal in the 53 kg category. During 2008, she set national records 98 times across junior and senior classes, ending the year holding all junior and senior records for the 53 kg weight category other than the clean and jerk. In the 58 kg category, she held every record that she could as someone aged under 18. The British Olympic Association named her their Athlete of the Year for Weightlifting. At the age of 14 she was the second-ranked UK female weightlifter, behind only two-time Commonwealth champion Michaela Breeze.

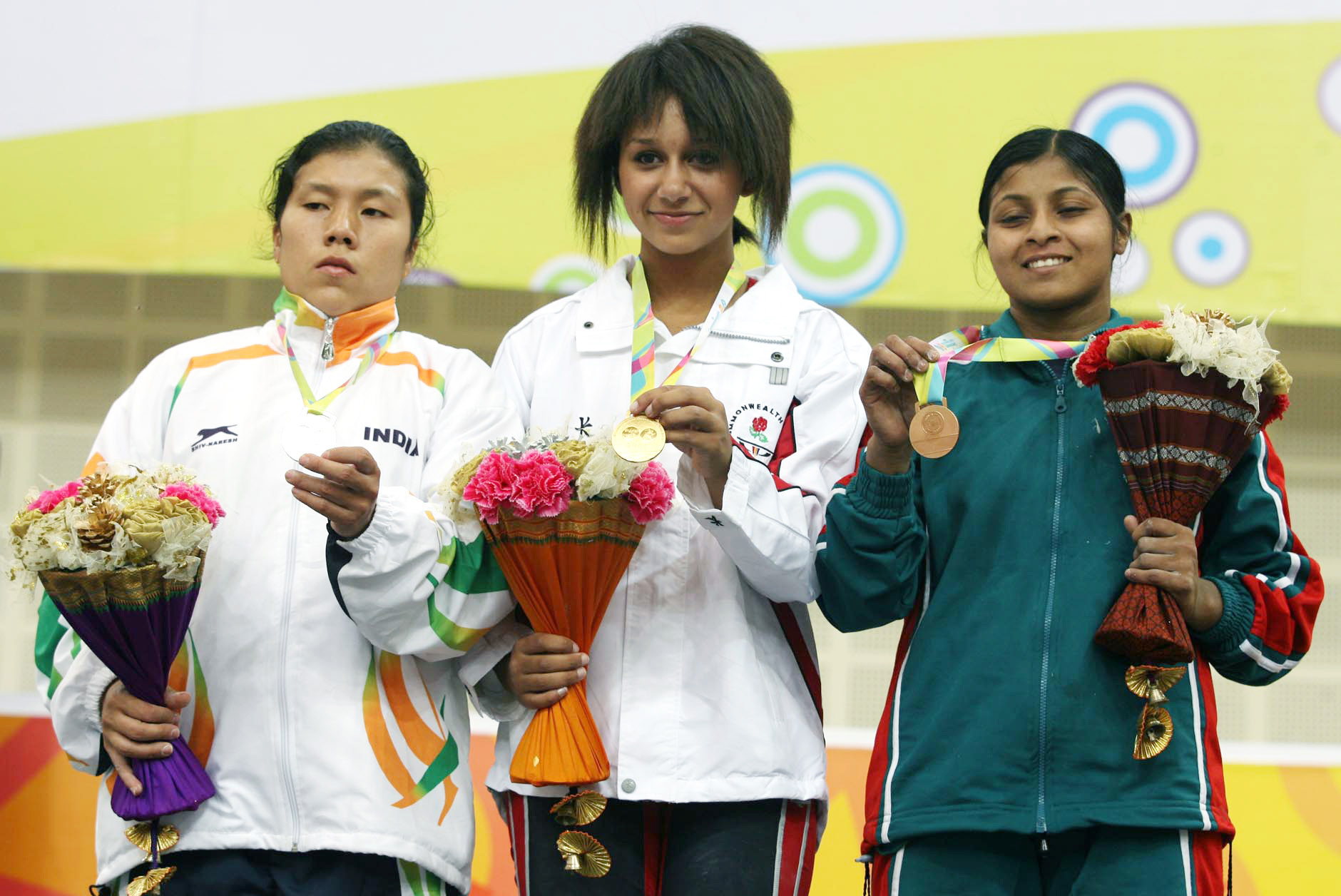
Smith (centre) at the 2008 Commonwealth Youth Games, where she finished first, ahead of Laxmi N and Akther Fayema

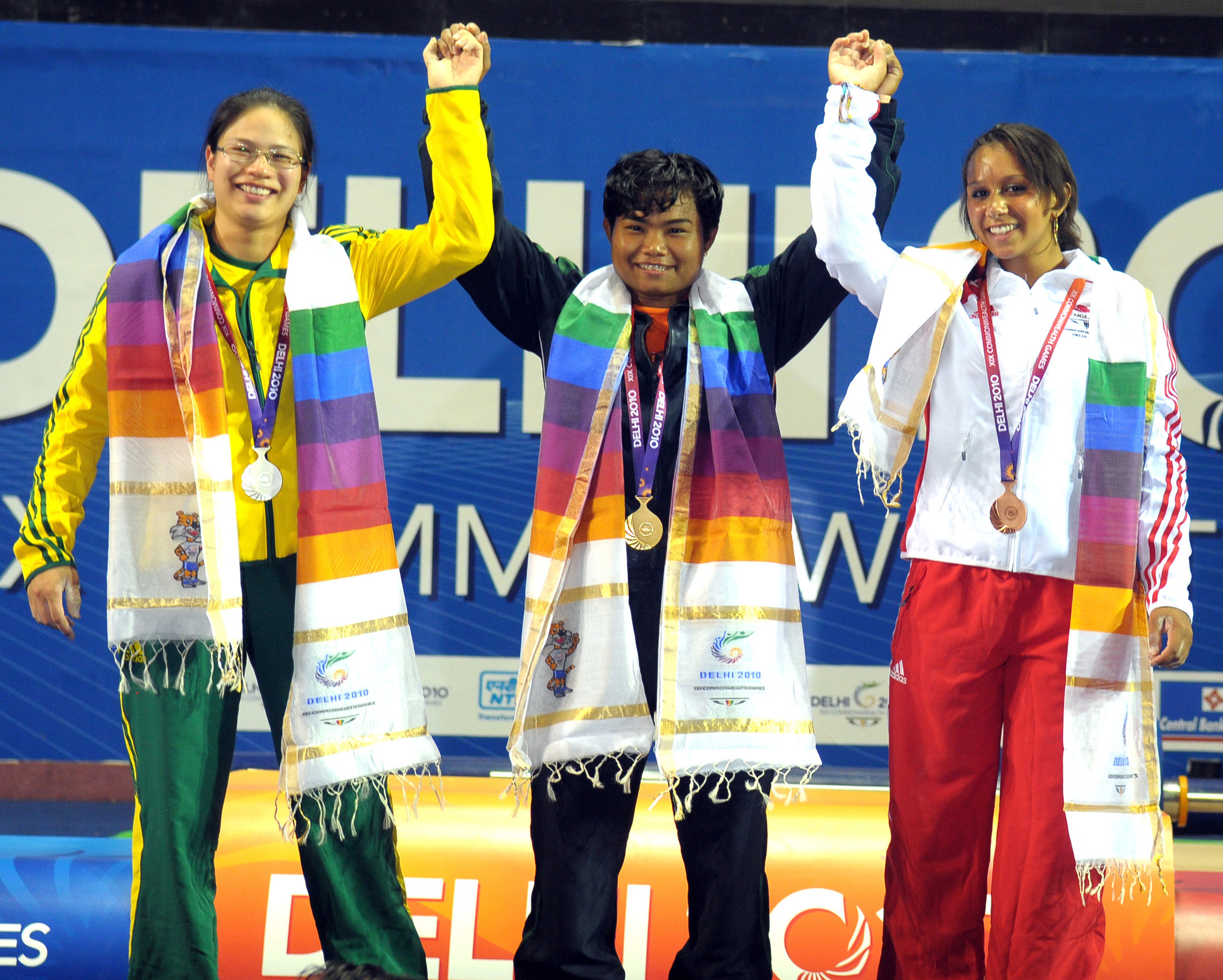
Smith (right) at the medal presentation ceremony at the 2010 Commonwealth Games, where she won the bronze medal. Ranu Bala Chanu Yumnam won the gold medal, and Seen Lee took the silver.

Aged 15, Smith finished sixth at the 2009 European Junior Championships (for competitors up to 20 years old), a result that John Goodbody of The Sunday Times wrote "provided further evidence of her immense potential". In October 2010 she won a bronze medal in the women's 58 kg division at the 2010 Commonwealth Games in Delhi, India, her first senior international competition, to become the first Englishwoman to win a Commonwealth Games weightlifting medal. She was shortlisted for the 2010 BBC Young Sports Personality of the Year award. In December 2010, British Weight Lifting paused her £550-a-year funding, arguing that she was overweight and not adequately committed to her training; her appeal against the decision was rejected. Her funding was reinstated in February 2011 after what British Weight Lifting described as "positive changes".

=== 2012 Olympics and following years ===
In May 2012 Smith was chosen to represent Great Britain at the 2012 Summer Olympics in London. She competed in the Women's 58 kg division and took the British record with a clean and jerk lift of 121 kg. With a snatch of 90 kg she was placed 12th in her weight class with a total of 211 kg.

After winning bronze at the 2014 European Weightlifting Championships in April, lifting 204 kg, she won the gold medal at the Commonwealth Games in Glasgow in July, lifting a total of 210 kg. She travelled for the 2014 World Weightlifting Championships, but contracted a virus and had to withdraw before lifting. Following the 2014 Commonwealth Games, Smith has said, she gained about 10 kg in weight, and having sometimes struggled to keep under 60 kg, she decided on a target weight of 63–64 kg. Competing at a major event in the 63 kg category for the first time, Smith finished ninth at the 2015 World Weightlifting Championships.

She took a bronze at the 2016 European Weightlifting Championships. By August 2016, Smith held four British clean and jerk records spread across three weight classes. She missed being selected for the 2016 Olympics following a shoulder injury that she incurred at the 2015 British Championships.

=== Since 2018 ===
Around 2018, Smith relocated to the Midlands and, having paused her education while training for the 2012 Olympics, joined Loughborough College to study for A-levels in biology, psychology, and environmental science. In 2018, Ben Bloom wrote in The Daily Telegraph that since 2014 Smith had become "a sporting nobody; a beacon of talent that faded away into a foggy memory of seemingly unfulfilled promise". He described how her shoulder injury, the end of centralised funding for weightlifting in the UK, and the loss of Smith's sponsors, had led to Smith moving back in with her parents and taking a job as a barista. Smith described this time by saying, "It all became too much. I fell into a dark place and my mental health plummeted."

At the 2018 Commonwealth Games, Smith took the silver medal in the women's 63 kg category. Going into the competition with a back injury, she was permitted to have an epidural administration to reduce the pain. After a close contest with Mona Pretorius for second place, Smith prevailed, equalling Pretorius's lift of 115 kg in the clean and jerk after exceeding her lift in the snatch. Bloom commented that "it is time to update those career highlights" on Smith's Wikipedia article.

As UK Sport had decided to cut funding for weightlifting in 2016, Smith launched a crowdfunding appeal in July 2018, seeking to raise £10,000 to help her qualify for the 2020 Olympics. She reached her target, and was selected. She finished in sixth place at the 2021 European Weightlifting Championships (64 kg) in April 2021, and eighth in the Women's 59 kg category at the Olympics in July of that year, two places higher than she had finished in 2012.

At the 2023 European Weightlifting Championships she won the gold in clean and jerk and the bronze in the 64 kg total category. She retired from the 59 kg competition at the 2024 European Championships after failing a snatch. At the 2024 IWF World Cup, in the 64 kg category, Smith lifted 85 kg in the snatch and 113 kg in the clean and jerk, but this was not enough, at her last opportunity, to secure a place at the 2024 Summer Olympics.

=== Coaching and preparation ===
She was coached by Andy Callard. Callard nicknamed her "Pablo", after the Olympic gold medal winner Pablo Lara, who had a reputation for being lazy. He also coached her sister Yana Smith for weightlifting at the London Youth Games. In a 2013 piece for The Times, Smith wrote that she liked to eat pizza before the start of competitions, wore make-up during events to help her feel good, and would order more pizza immediately after competing. Smith, Giles Greenwood and Fraer Morrow founded the East London Weightlifting Club, where Smith coaches.

== Media appearances ==
Smith was a guest on the BBC One quiz show Question of Sport in 2012, 2014, and 2023. She featured in British Olympic Dreams on BBC One in 2012 and alongside fellow weightlifters Hannah Powell and Helen Jewell in Girl Power: Going for Gold on BBC Three the same year. Later in 2012, she spoke on BBC radio and television about dealing with critical comments regarding her not conforming to a typical physique. She has been a guest on Ace and Vis (BBC Radio 1Xtra, 2012), Phil Williams (BBC Radio 5 Live, 2015), The Danny Baker Show (BBC Radio 5 Live, 2015), and Jessica Fostekew: Sturdy Girl Club (BBC Radio 4, 2023).

Smith was a participant in the Channel 4 programme Time Crashers (2015), in which celebrities were placed in environments recreating specific historical times. In the first episode, which was in an Elizabethan-era setting, Smith cried as Kirstie Alley and Fern Britton were peeling the skin from a boar's skull.

== Major competition results ==
Senior results for Zoe Smith
Year	Venue	Weight	Snatch (kg)				Clean and jerk (kg)				Total	Rank
Year	Venue	Weight	1	2	3	Rank	1	2	3	Rank	Total	Rank
Representing Great Britain
Olympic Games
2012	(United Kingdom) London, Great Britain	58 kg	90	~~93~~	~~93~~	13	116	~~121~~	121	9	211	10
2020	Tokyo, Japan	59 kg	~~87~~	87	~~91~~	8	113	~~116~~	~~119~~	6	200	8
World Championships
2015	Houston, United States	63 kg	94	97	~~100~~	11	120	124	~~128~~	9	221	9
2018	Ashgabat, Turkmenistan	64 kg	~~92~~	92	95	14	117	~~120~~	120	15	215	17
European Championships
2012	Antalya, Turkey	58 kg	85	89	92	4	110	116	~~120~~	4	208	4
2014	Tel Aviv, Israel	58 kg	~~86~~	86	90	5	114	~~118~~	~~118~~	3rd place, bronze medalist(s)	204	3rd place, bronze medalist(s)
2016	Førde, Norway	63 kg	93	96	~~98~~	4	116	~~119~~	119	3rd place, bronze medalist(s)	215	4
2019	(Georgia (country)) Batumi, Georgia	64 kg	92	96	~~98~~	6	122	126	128	2nd place, silver medalist(s)	224	3rd place, bronze medalist(s)
2021	Moscow, Russia	59 kg	87	~~89~~	89	7	~~111~~	111	~~114~~	5	200	5
2023	Yerevan, Armenia	64 kg	90	93	~~95~~	5	119	121	~~122~~	1st place, gold medalist(s)	214	3rd place, bronze medalist(s)
2024	Sofia, Bulgaria	59 kg	~~84.0~~	–	–	–	-	-	–	–		
British International Open
2019	(United Kingdom) Coventry, Great Britain	64 kg	91	94	100	2nd place, silver medalist(s)	120	125	~~130~~	1st place, gold medalist(s)	225	1st place, gold medalist(s)
IWF World Cup
2024	Phuket, Thailand	64 kg	~~85~~	85	~~88~~	32	109	113	~~116~~	23	198	24
Representing England
Commonwealth Games
2010	Delhi, India	58 kg	~~80~~	80	85	4	103	106	108	3rd place, bronze medalist(s)	188	3rd place, bronze medalist(s)
2014	Glasgow, Scotland	53 kg	89	92	~~95~~	2nd place, silver medalist(s)	112	115	118	1st place, gold medalist(s)	202	1st place, gold medalist(s)
2018	Gold Coast, Australia	63 kg	87	90	92	2nd place, silver medalist(s)	110	112	115	2nd place, silver medalist(s)	207	2nd place, silver medalist(s)
British Senior Championships
2010	(United Kingdom) Kilmarnock	63 kg	76	81	86	2nd place, silver medalist(s)	102	~~109~~	~~115~~	2nd place, silver medalist(s)	188	2nd place, silver medalist(s)
2012	(United Kingdom) South Normanton	63 kg	87	91	94	1st place, gold medalist(s)	113	117	~~120.0~~	1st place, gold medalist(s)	211	1st place, gold medalist(s)
2014	(United Kingdom) Coventry	63 kg	83	86	88	1st place, gold medalist(s)	104	108	112	1st place, gold medalist(s)	200	1st place, gold medalist(s)
2015	(United Kingdom) Coventry	63 kg	90	93	96	1st place, gold medalist(s)	114	118	~~123~~	1st place, gold medalist(s)	214	1st place, gold medalist(s)
2016	(United Kingdom) Coventry	63 kg	~~92~~	~~92~~	-	–	-	–	–	–		
2017	(United Kingdom) Coventry	63 kg	84	87	~~90~~	2nd place, silver medalist(s)	113	~~117~~	117	2nd place, silver medalist(s)	204	2nd place, silver medalist(s)

Junior and Youth results for Zoe Smith
Year	Venue	Weight	Snatch (kg)				Clean and jerk (kg)				Total	Rank
Year	Venue	Weight	1	2	3	Rank	1	2	3	Rank	Total	Rank
Representing Great Britain
World Championships
2009 Youth	Chiangmai, Thailand	58 kg	70	74	75	8	89	92	94	9	169	8
2011 Youth	Lima, Peru	64 kg	86	91	~~93~~	2nd place, silver medalist(s)	105	110	~~115~~	3rd place, bronze medalist(s)	201	2nd place, silver medalist(s)
European Championships
2007 Youth	Pavia, Italy	53 kg	54	58	60	9	67	70	72	12	132	10
2008 Youth	Amiens, France	53 kg	64	–	-	7	87	–	-	2nd place, silver medalist(s)	151	5
2009 Junior	Landskrona, Sweden	58 kg	70	74	76	4	89	89	93	5	169	5
2009 Youth	Eilat, Israel	58 kg	~~73~~	73	77	7	90	93	~~96~~	4	166	5
2010 Youth	Valencia, Spain	58 kg	74	80	84	3rd place, bronze medalist(s)	101	105	110	2nd place, silver medalist(s)	194	2nd place, silver medalist(s)
Representing England
Commonwealth Youth Games
2008	Pune, India	53 kg									159	1st place, gold medalist(s)
British Championships
2009 Junior	(United Kingdom) UK											1st place, gold medalist(s)
2009 Youth	(United Kingdom) UK											1st place, gold medalist(s)
