= Weightlifting at the 2018 Commonwealth Games – Women's 63 kg =

Weightlifting – Women's 63 kg at the 2018 Commonwealth Games
- Venue: Carrara Sports and Leisure Centre
- Dates: 7 April 2018
- Competitors: 13 from 13 nations
- Winning total weight: 220

Medalists
gold medal	Maude Charron	Canada
silver medal	Zoe Smith	England
bronze medal	Mona Pretorius	South Africa

The Women's 63 kg weightlifting event at the 2018 Commonwealth Games took place at the Carrara Sports and Leisure Centre on 7 April 2018. The weightlifter from Canada won the gold, with a combined lift of 220 kg.

== Records ==
Prior to this competition, the existing world, Commonwealth and Games records were as follows:

World record	Snatch	Svetlana Tsarukayeva (RUS)	117 kg	Paris, France	8 November 2011
World record	Clean & Jerk	Deng Wei (CHN)	147 kg	Rio de Janeiro, Brazil	9 August 2016
World record	Total	Deng Wei (CHN)	262 kg	Rio de Janeiro, Brazil	9 August 2016
Commonwealth record	Snatch	Christine Girard (CAN)	106 kg	Lake Country, Canada	20 August 2011
Commonwealth record	Clean & Jerk	Christine Girard (CAN)	134 kg	Edmonton, Canada	31 March 2012
Commonwealth record	Total	Christine Girard (CAN)	238 kg	Guadalajara, Mexico	25 October 2011
Games record	Snatch	Michaela Breeze (WAL)	100 kg	Melbourne, Australia	19 March 2006
Games record	Clean & Jerk	Christine Girard (CAN)	121 kg	Melbourne, Australia	19 March 2006
Games record	Total	Michaela Breeze (WAL)	220 kg	Melbourne, Australia	19 March 2006

The following records were established during the competition:

Clean & Jerk	122 kg	Maude Charron (CAN)	GR

== Schedule ==
All times are Australian Eastern Standard Time (UTC+10)

Date	Time	Round
Saturday, 7 April 2018	14:12	Final

== Results ==
Rank	Athlete	Body weight (kg)	Snatch (kg)				Clean & Jerk (kg)				Total
Rank	Athlete	Body weight (kg)	1	2	3	Result	1	2	3	Result	Total
1st place, gold medalist(s)	Maude Charron (CAN)	62.24	94	~~98~~	98	98	117	~~122~~	122	122 GR	220
2nd place, silver medalist(s)	Zoe Smith (ENG)	62.50	87	90	92	92	110	112	115	115	207
3rd place, bronze medalist(s)	Mona Pretorius (RSA)	62.77	84	88	91	91	108	112	115	115	206
4	Emma McQuaid (NIR)	62.53	79	82	~~84~~	82	100	~~102~~	~~102~~	100	182
5	Vandna Gupta (IND)	62.67	~~80~~	~~80~~	80	80	100	~~104~~	~~104~~	100	180
6	Mabia Akhter (BAN)	62.54	73	~~77~~	78	78	98	102	~~103~~	102	180
7	Yazmin Zammit Stevens (MLT)	62.79	74	77	79	79	95	~~99~~	~~100~~	95	174
8	Maximina Uepa (NRU)	62.99	73	77	~~79~~	77	~~93~~	93	~~100~~	93	170
9	Holly Knowles (WAL)	62.32	~~73~~	~~73~~	73	73	90	~~93~~	93	93	166
10	Irene Kasuubo (UGA)	61.06	65	69	71	71	81	85	~~88~~	85	156
11	Winnie Okoth (KEN)	60.30	~~66~~	66	~~70~~	66	81	~~86~~	87	87	153
	Clementina Agricole (SEY)	62.93	~~81~~	83	~~86~~	83	~~107~~	~~108~~	~~110~~	–	–
	Seen Lee (AUS)	62.88	~~87~~	~~88~~	~~88~~	—					DNF
