= Weightlifting at the 2014 Commonwealth Games – Women's 58 kg =

Weightlifting – Women's 58 kg at the 2014 Commonwealth Games
- Venue: Clyde Auditorium
- Dates: 26 July 2014
- Competitors: 15 from 12 nations
- Winning total weight: 210 kg

Medalists
gold medal	Zoe Smith	England
silver medal	Ndidi Winifred	Nigeria
bronze medal	Michaela Breeze	Wales

The Women's 58 kg weightlifting event at the 2014 Commonwealth Games took place on 26 July and was the fifth weightlifting event to conclude. The event took place at the Clyde Auditorium in Glasgow, Scotland. The weightlifter from England won the gold, with a combined lift of 210 kg.

== Result ==
The final standing of the competitors was as follows:

Rank	Athlete	Snatch (kg)				Clean & Jerk (kg)				Total (kg)	Notes
Rank	Athlete	1	2	3	Result	1	2	3	Result	Total (kg)	Notes
1st place, gold medalist(s)	Zoe Smith (ENG)	89	92	~~95~~	92	112	115	118	118	210	GR
2nd place, silver medalist(s)	Ndidi Winifred (NGR)	90	~~95~~	~~95~~	90	110	~~115~~	116	116	206	
3rd place, bronze medalist(s)	Michaela Breeze (WAL)	91	93	~~95~~	93	108	109	~~113~~	109	202	GR
4	Clementina Agricole (SEY)	~~85~~	85	88	88	~~111~~	111	~~116~~	111	199	
5	Meena Kumari (IND)	80	~~83~~	83	83	111	~~117~~	~~119~~	111	194	
6	Seen Lee (AUS)	~~83~~	83	87	87	~~103~~	103	~~106~~	103	190	
7	Marie-Julie Malboeuf (CAN)	82	~~85~~	~~85~~	82	95	100	~~102~~	100	182	
8	Jenly Wini (SOL)	~~79~~	79	~~82~~	79	102	~~105~~	~~105~~	102	181	
9	Isabelle Despres (CAN)	78	~~81~~	81	81	98	~~101~~	~~101~~	98	179	
10	Ruby Malvina (SEY)	~~70~~	70	75	75	~~95~~	95	~~100~~	95	170	
11	Fayema Akther (BAN)	70	73	75	75	90	~~95~~	~~95~~	90	165	
12	Ndoua Epie Osoungou (CMR)	70	~~75~~	~~75~~	70	85	90	~~92~~	90	160	
13	Christie Williams (WAL)	65	~~70~~	~~70~~	65	80	~~85~~	~~85~~	80	145	
14	Sophie Smyth (SCO)	~~60~~	60	~~65~~	60	78	81	85	85	145	
-	Hanitra Rahaivosoa (MRI)	~~82~~	82	~~85~~	82	~~100~~	~~100~~	~~100~~	-	-	
