= Weightlifting at the 2010 Commonwealth Games – Women's 58 kg =

The women's 58 kg weightlifting event was the second-lightest women's event at the weightlifting competition, limiting competitors to a maximum of 58 kilograms of body mass. The competition took place on 6 October. The weightlifter from India won the gold, with a combined lift of 197 kg.

== Results ==
Rank	Name	Country	B.weight (kg)	Snatch (kg)	Clean & Jerk (kg)	Total (kg)
1st place, gold medalist(s)	Yumnam Renubala Chanu	India	57.93	90	107	197
2nd place, silver medalist(s)	Seen Lee	Australia	57.64	86	106	192
3rd place, bronze medalist(s)	Zoe Smith	England	57.98	85	103	188
4	Clementina Agricole	Seychelles	57.59	87	100	187
5	Emily Quarton	Canada	57.90	80	105	185
6	Annie Moniqui	Canada	57.55	82	102	184
7	Rita Kari	Papua New Guinea	57.71	75	103	178
8	Pilar Bakam Tzuche	Cameroon	57.76	75	96	171
9	Helen Jewell	England	57.13	77	93	170
10	Fayema Akther	Bangladesh	57.42	72	92	164
11	Monalisa Kassman	Papua New Guinea	56.91	55	70	125
–	Winifred Eze Ndidi	Nigeria	57.45	–	–	DNF
–	Mona Pretorius	South Africa	57.38	76	–	DNF

== See also ==
- 2010 Commonwealth Games
- Weightlifting at the 2010 Commonwealth Games
