= British International Open 2019 =

2019 British weightlifting competition

- Venue: Ricoh Arena
- Location: Coventry, Great Britain
- Dates: 7–9 June
- Competitors: 71 from 20 nations

The British International Open 2019 (known as The Birds Eye British Championships for sponsorship reasons) was an IWF bronze level weightlifting event hosted at the Ricoh Arena in Coventry on the 7-9 June 2019. The competition was a qualifier for the Tokyo 2020 Olympics and featured 71 athletes from over 20 nations.

== Schedule ==
The following is the competition schedule for the British International Open competitions:

Date	Time	Event
Friday, 7 June	15:30	Women's 49kg
Friday, 7 June	18:10	Women's 55kg
Friday, 7 June	20:20	Men's 73kg
Saturday, 8 June	08:30	Women's 59kg
Saturday, 8 June	10:30	Men's 81kg
Saturday, 8 June	12:30	Women's 64kg
Saturday, 8 June	14:50	Men's 89kg
Saturday, 8 June	17:00	Women's 71kg
Saturday, 8 June	18:50	Men's 96kg
Saturday, 8 June	20:50	Men's 102kg
Sunday, 9 June	09:00	Women's 76kg
Sunday, 9 June	11:20	Women's 81kg
Sunday, 9 June	13:10	Men's 109kg
Sunday, 9 June	15:20	Women's 87kg & 87+kg
Sunday, 9 June	17:30	Men's 109+ kg

Start times as listed on the official schedule

== Event summary ==
Host nation Great Britain won the most medals with 13 and recorded a 1-2 finish in the Woman's 64kg class with Zoe Smith edging out Sarah Davies by just a single kilogram. China topped the gold medal tally with a total of 3. Four-times World Champion Ilya Ilyin made his second international start since returning from suspension and took silver in the Men's 96kg class. The group was won by Ukraine's Kyryl Pyrohov. Ilyin's Kazakhstan compatriot Denis Ulanov won gold in the Men's 81kg class.

== Medal table ==
* Host nation (Great Britain)

Rank	Nation	Gold	Silver	Bronze	Total
1	China (CHN)	3	2	0	5
2	Czech Republic (CZE)	2	2	1	5
3	Norway (NOR)	2	0	0	2
3	Ukraine (UKR)	2	0	0	2
5	Great Britain (GBR)*	1	5	7	13
6	United States (USA)	1	3	0	4
7	Kazakhstan (KAZ)	1	1	0	2
8	Romania (ROM)	1	0	1	2
9	Estonia (EST)	1	0	0	1
9	Switzerland (CHE)	1	0	0	1
11	Ireland (IRL)	0	1	0	1
11	Lithuania (LIT)	0	1	0	1
13	Belgium (BEL)	0	0	1	1
13	Finland (FIN)	0	0	1	1
13	Netherlands (NED)	0	0	1	1
13	Saint Vincent and the Grenadines (SVG)	0	0	1	1
13	Seychelles (SEY)	0	0	1	1
Totals (17 entries)		15	15	14	44

== Medalists ==
=== Men's events ===
Event	Gold		Silver		Bronze	
73 kg	Petr Petrov; Czech Republic	295 kg	Gareth Evans; Great Britain	286 kg	Rick Confiance; Seychelles	253 kg
81 kg	Denis Ulanov; Kazakhstan	325 kg	Sean Brown; Ireland	304 kg	Chris Murray; Great Britain	285 kg
96 kg	Kyril Pyrohov; Ukraine	351 kg	Ilya Ilyin; Kazakhstan	350 kg	Edmon Avetisyan; Great Britain	329 kg
102 kg	Leho Pent; Estonia	331 kg	Jiří Gasior; Czech Republic	312 kg	N/A [[|]]	N/A
109 kg	Dmytro Chumak; Ukraine	380 kg	Arnas Šidiškis; Lithuania	350 kg	Owen Boxall; Great Britain	350 kg
+109 kg	Jiří Orság; Czech Republic	396 kg	Kamil Kučera; Czech Republic	395 kg	Enzo Kuworge; Netherlands	370 kg

=== Women's events ===
Event	Gold		Silver		Bronze	
49 kg	Zhang Rong; China	195 kg	Kelly-Jo Robson; Great Britain	156 kg	Hannah Powell; Great Britain	151 kg
55 kg	Sarah Øvsthus; Norway	183 kg	Fraer Morrow; Great Britain	180 kg	Elena Andrieș; Romania	179 kg
59 kg	Sol Anette Waaler; Norway	187 kg	Olivia Blatch; Great Britain	183 kg	Jenny Tong; Great Britain	170 kg
64 kg	Zoe Smith; Great Britain	225 kg	Sarah Davies; Great Britain	224 kg	Marianne Saarhelo; Finland	193 kg
71 kg	Loredana Toma; Romania	244 kg	Huang Ting; China	221 kg	Sally Bennett; Great Britain	196 kg
76 kg	Nora Jäggi; Switzerland	206 kg	Taylor Jordan-Harris; United States	201 kg	Simona Hertlová; Czech Republic	197 kg
81 kg	Briana Sfamurri; United States	214 kg	Phoebe Hoi-Kay N’Golo; United States	202 kg	Rayen Cupid; Saint Vincent and the Grenadines	196 kg
87 kg	Yue Kang; China	268 kg	Juliana Riotto; United States	226 kg	Anna Van Bellinghen; Belgium	215 kg
+87 kg	Zhou Xiaoman; China	300 kg	Jia Weipeng; China	256 kg	Emily Campbell; Great Britain	255 kg
