= Darius Jokarzadeh =

Welsh weightlifter

Personal information
- Full name: Darius Asadullah Jokarzadeh
- Born: 25 June 1993 (age 33) Cardiff, Wales
- Weight: 127.17 kg (280.4 lb)

Sport
- Country: Great Britain; Wales
- Sport: Weightlifting
- Weight class: +105 kg
- Team: National team
Medal record
Representing Wales
Men's weightlifting
Commonwealth Championships
Bronze medal – third place	2011 Cape Town	+105 kg
- Updated on 13 December 2017

Darius Jokarzadeh (born 25 June 1993) is a Welsh male weightlifter, competing in the +105 kg category.

Jokarzadeh was born in Cardiff to an Iranian father. He attended Ysgol Gyfun Gymraeg Glantaf, a secondary school that teaches through the medium of Welsh. He was a sport rower before taking up weightlifting.

As a junior he set an overall British records in Olympic weightlifting in the clean & jerk, lifting 215 kg at the World Junior Championships in Lima, Peru on 10 May 2013. He represented Wales at the 2014 Commonwealth Games in the +105 kg event.

== Major competitions ==
Year	Venue	Weight	Snatch (kg)				Clean & Jerk (kg)				Total	Rank
Year	Venue	Weight	1	2	3	Rank	1	2	3	Rank	Total	Rank
Representing Great Britain
European Championships
2016	Førde, Norway	+105 kg	~~162~~	162	~~168~~	14	190	195	~~202~~	18	357	15
2013	Tirana, Albania	+105 kg	165	173	~~178~~	9	190	197	202	9	375	9
2012	Antalya, Turkey	+105 kg	~~155~~	~~155~~	155	16	180	~~185~~	185	15	340	15
Representing Wales
Commonwealth Games
2014	Glasgow, Scotland	+105 kg	165	~~175~~	~~175~~	4	196	~~212~~	~~212~~	4	361	4
Commonwealth Championships
2011	Cape Town, South Africa	+105 kg	125	~~131~~	~~135~~	3rd place, bronze medalist(s)	155	161	~~165~~	3rd place, bronze medalist(s)	286	3rd place, bronze medalist(s)
