= Mercy Brown (weightlifter) =

English weightlifter (born 1996)

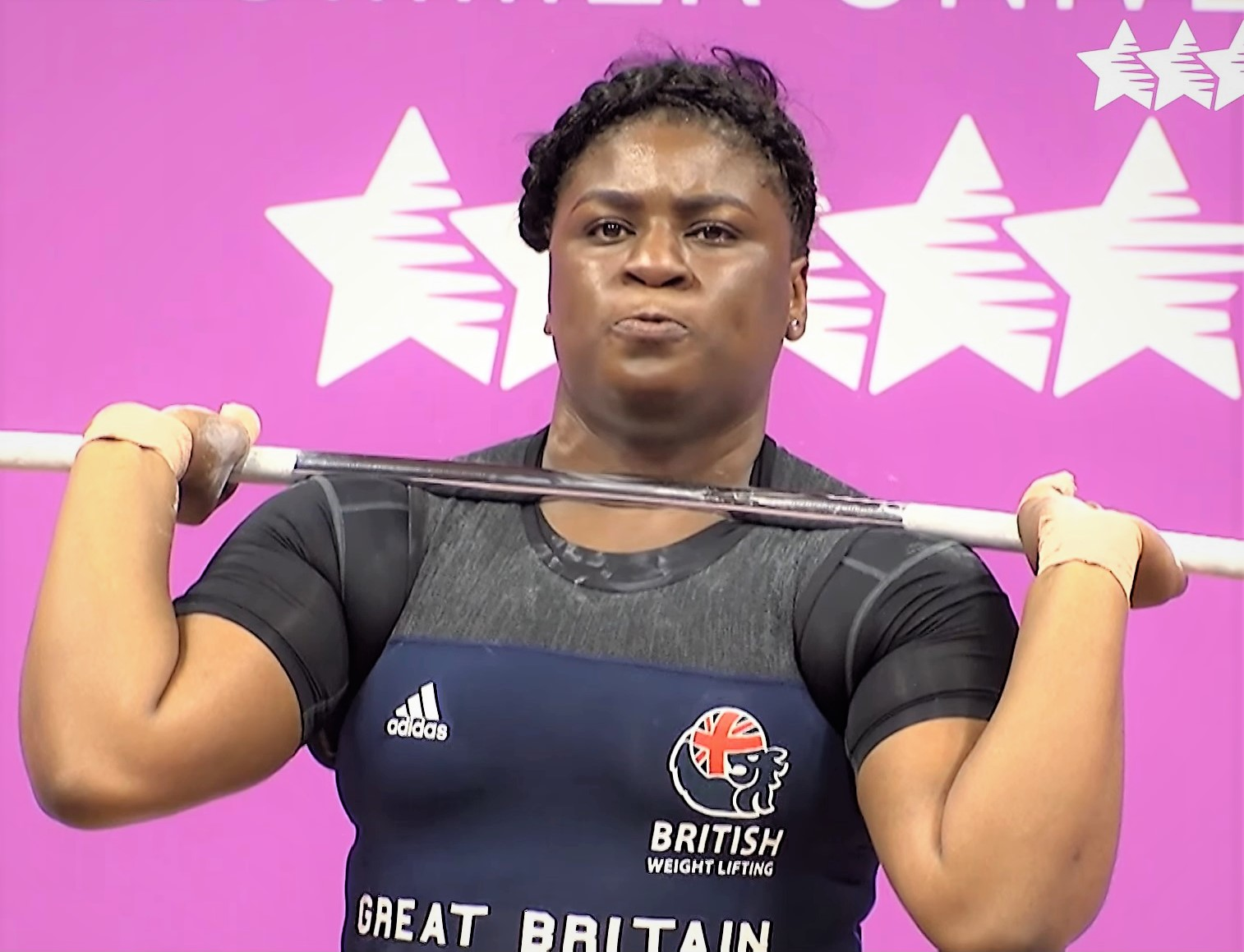
- Brown at the 2017 Summer Universiade

Personal information
- Nationality: British
- Born: Mercy Opeyemi Brown; 20 June 1996 (age 30) London
- Height: 1.66 m (5 ft 5 1/2 in)
- Weight: 90 kg (200 lb)

Sport
- Country: Great Britain
- Sport: Weightlifting
- Event: –90kg
- Club: TSN Weightlifting
- Coached by: George Manners
Medal record
Women's weightlifting
Representing Great Britain
European Championships
Silver medal – second place	Førde 2016	+75 kg
European U23 Championships
Bronze medal – third place	2019 Bucharest	+87 kg
Universiade
Bronze medal – third place	2017 Taipei	+90 kg

Mercy Brown (born 20 June 1996 in London) is an English weightlifter. She holds three British records.

== Early career ==
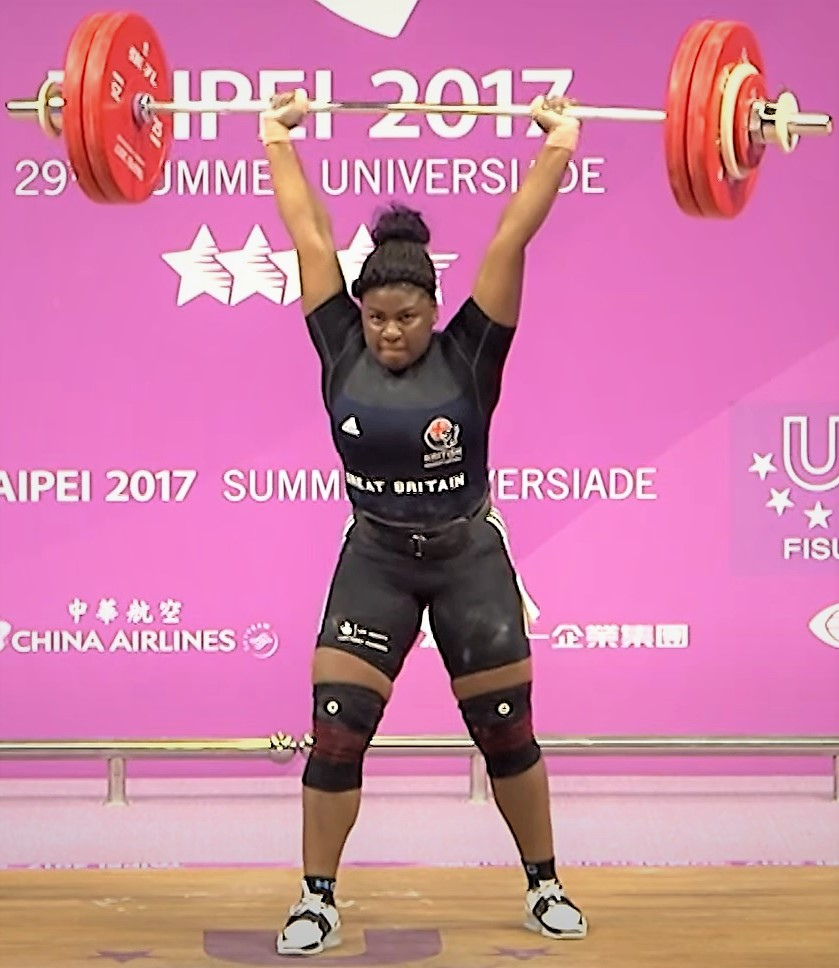
Brown at the 2017 Summer Universiade

Brown started lifting in 2011 at the age of 15. She earned her first medal (bronze) in 2013 at the European U17 Championship.

== Major results ==
Year	Venue	Weight	Snatch (kg)				Clean & Jerk (kg)				Total	Rank
Year	Venue	Weight	1	2	3	Rank	1	2	3	Rank	Total	Rank
Representing Great Britain
World Championships
2014	Almaty, Kazakhstan	75 kg	89	92	94	16	111	~~116~~	116	18	210	18
2015	Houston, United States	+75 kg	101	~~105~~	~~105~~	26	121	123	126	28	227	28
European Championships
2016	Førde, Norway	+75 kg	100	103	~~106~~	2nd place, silver medalist(s)	123	127	~~130~~	3rd place, bronze medalist(s)	230	2nd place, silver medalist(s)
2025	Chișinău, Moldova	+87 kg	104	108	~~111~~	4	—	—	—	—	—	—
Universiade
2017	New Taipei, Taipei	+90 kg	98	~~103~~	~~104~~	5	125	134	136	3	234	3rd place, bronze medalist(s)
Representing England
Commonwealth Games
2014	Glasgow, Scotland	75 kg	~~91~~	91	~~94~~	—N/a	~~112~~	~~112~~	112	—N/a	203	4

== Junior results ==
- 2016 European Junior Championships: Bronze
- 2016 World Junior Championships: Bronze
- 2015 European Junior Championships: Gold
- 2015 World Junior Championships: 8th
- 2014 European Junior Championships: Bronze
- 2014 World Junior Championships: 6th
