= Katrina Feklistova =

British weightlifter (born 1997)

Personal information
- Nationality: British
- Born: 6 April 1997 (age 29)

Sport
- Sport: Olympic weightlifting
- Weight class: 81kg
- Coached by: Mehmed Fikretov

Achievements and titles
- Personal best: Total 224kg

Katrina Feklistova (born 6 April 1997) is a British champion Olympic weightlifter and holder of three British weightlifting records.

Feklistova competed at the 2022 European Championships in the 76 kg category, finishing in 11th place. In November 2022, she went up to the 81 kg category for the England Championships, where she won gold and secured two British records.

At the 2023 European Championships, Feklistova competed in the 81 kg category and finished fifth with a total of 223 kg, setting new records for the snatch, clean and jerk and total.

Feklistova was one of five athletes selected to represent Great Britain at the IWF Grand Prix in Havana in 2023. After achieving a personal best total of 224 kg, a new British record, UK Sport offered her elite athlete funding to enable her to invest more time in her weightlifting career, with potential to compete in the Olympic Games in 2028.

Feklistova is coached by former Bulgarian weightlifting champion Mehmed Fikretov at his gym in Camberwell, South East London. She trains alongside fellow British champion Erin Barton, and Omarie Mears, who represents Jamaica
