= Weightlifting at the 2022 Commonwealth Games – Women's 55 kg =

Weightlifting – Women's 55 kg at the 2022 Commonwealth Games
- Venue: National Exhibition Centre
- Dates: 30 July
- Competitors: 11 from 11 nations
- Winning total: 203 kg

Medalists
gold medal	Adijat Olarinoye	Nigeria
silver medal	Bindyarani Sorokhaibam	India
bronze medal	Fraer Morrow	England

The Women's 55 kg weightlifting event at the 2022 Commonwealth Games took place at the National Exhibition Centre on 30 July 2022. The weightlifter from Nigeria won the gold, with a combined lift of 203 kg.

== Records ==
Prior to this competition, the existing world, Commonwealth and Games records were as follows:
When the previous records and weight classes were discarded following readjustment, the IWF defined "world standards" as the minimum lifts needed to qualify as world records (WR), CommonWealth Authority defined "Commonwealth standards" and "Commonwealth games standards" as the minimum lifts needed to qualify as Commonwealth record (CR) and Commonwealth games record (GR) in the new weight classes. Wherever World Standard/Commonwealth Standard/Commonwealth Games Standard appear in the list below, no qualified weightlifter has yet lifted the benchmark weights in a sanctioned competition.

World record	Snatch	Li Yajun (CHN)	102 kg	Ashgabat, Turkmenistan	3 November 2018
World record	Clean & Jerk	Liao Qiuyun (CHN)	129 kg	Pattaya, Thailand	20 September 2019
World record	Total	Liao Qiuyun (CHN)	227 kg	Pattaya, Thailand	20 September 2019
Commonwealth record	Snatch	Chika Amalaha (NGR)	95 kg	Cairo, Egypt	26 April 2019
Commonwealth record	Clean & Jerk	Adijat Olarinoye (NGR)	116 kg	Rabat, Morocco	26 August 2019
Commonwealth record	Total	Adijat Olarinoye (NGR)	209 kg	Rabat, Morocco	26 August 2019
Games record	Snatch	Commonwealth Games Standard	83 kg		
Games record	Clean & Jerk	Commonwealth Games Standard	106 kg		
Games record	Total	Commonwealth Games Standard	189 kg		

The following records were established during the competition:

Snatch	92 kg	Adijat Olarinoye (NGR)	GR
Clean & Jerk	116 kg	Bindyarani Sorokhaibam (IND)	GR
Total	203 kg	Adijat Olarinoye (NGR)	GR

== Schedule ==
All times are British Summer Time (UTC+1)

Date	Time	Round
Saturday 30 July 2022	20:00	Final

== Results ==
Rank	Athlete	Body weight (kg)	Snatch (kg)				Clean & Jerk (kg)				Total
Rank	Athlete	Body weight (kg)	1	2	3	Result	1	2	3	Result	Total
1st place, gold medalist(s)	Adijat Olarinoye (NGR)	54.51	90	92	~~93~~	92 GR	~~110~~	110	111	111	203 GR
2nd place, silver medalist(s)	Bindyarani Sorokhaibam (IND)	54.01	81	84	86	86	110	~~114~~	116	116 GR	202
3rd place, bronze medalist(s)	Fraer Morrow (ENG)	54.57	86	89	~~91~~	89	~~109~~	109	~~115~~	109	198
4	Rachel Leblanc-Bazinet (CAN)	54.80	77	80	82	82	96	~~101~~	~~101~~	96	178
5	Cascandra Elly (MAS)	54.40	73	~~78~~	78	78	91	96	~~98~~	96	174
6	Sky Norris (JAM)	53.89	74	~~77~~	78	78	85	88	92	92	170
7	Chamari Warnakulasuriya (SRI)	54.83	70	~~74~~	~~74~~	70	90	~~94~~	94	94	164
8	My-Only Stephen (NRU)	54.29	~~68~~	68	~~70~~	68	86	~~88~~	~~88~~	86	154
―	Jenly Tegu Wini (SOL)	54.54	~~79~~	~~79~~	79	79	~~105~~	~~105~~	~~105~~	NM	DNF
―	Catrin Jones (WAL)	54.78	~~83~~	~~83~~	~~83~~	NM	—	—	—	―	DNF
―	Jodey Hughes (SCO)	54.81	~~71~~	~~71~~	~~71~~	NM	—	—	—	―	DNF
