= Ramiro Mora Romero =

Cuban weightlifter (born 1997)

Ramiro Mora Romero OLY
Personal information
- Nationality: Cuban
- Citizenship: Refugee status in United Kingdom
- Born: 29 August 1997 (age 29) Santiago de Cuba, Cuba

Sport
- Country: United Kingdom (weightlifting); Refugee Olympic Team (weightlifting)
- Sport: Weightlifting
- Weight class: 89 kg, 96 kg, 102 kg

Ramiro Mora Romero OLY (born 29 August 1997) is a Cuban weightlifter who competed for the Refugee Olympic Team at the 2024 Summer Olympics.

== Biography ==
A former member of the Cuban Weightlifting Team, Mora Romero arrived in Great Britain in 2019 as part of a circus group in which he performed as an aerialist before claiming asylum after taking part in a political protest during a visit to Cuba in 2021. He was given the refugee status on December 1, 2023.

He won the 89 kg title at the 2022 England Championships and the 96 kg category at the 2023 British Championships.

On 1 December 2023, Mora Romero was granted refugee status and received an International Olympic Committee Refugee Scholarship to help fund his training and participation in international competitions.

In May 2024, he was among 36 athletes named in the Refugee Olympic Team for that year's Summer Olympics in Paris, France, where he took part in the 102 kg category, finishing seventh after setting new personal bests in the snatch, clean and jerk and combined total.

He participated in 2026 European Weightlifting Championships for the qualification to XXIII Commonwealth Games 2026 in Glasgow.

== Major results ==
Year	Venue	Weight	Snatch (kg)				Clean & Jerk (kg)				Total	Rank
Year	Venue	Weight	1	2	3	Rank	1	2	3	Rank	Total	Rank
Olympic Games
2024	Paris, France	102 kg	161	166	~~168~~	—N/a	201	206	210	—N/a	376	7
IWF World Cup
2024	Phuket, Thailand	102 kg	157	162	~~165~~	18	197	—	—	20	359	18
European Weightlifting Championships
2026	Batumi, Georgia	94 kg	~~162~~	~~162~~	~~163~~	—	—	—	—	—	—	—
