= Harjinder Kaur =

Indian weightlifter (born 1996)

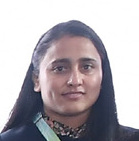
- Kaur in August 2022

Personal information
- Born: 14 October 1996 (age 29) Nabha, Punjab, India
- Height: 1.6 m (5 ft 3 in)
- Weight: 69 kg (152 lb)

Sport
- Sport: Weightlifting
- Event: 71 kg
Medal record
Women's weightlifting
Representing India
Commonwealth Games
Silver medal – second place	2026 Glasgow	69 kg
Bronze medal – third place	2022 Birmingham	71 kg
Commonwealth Championships
Bronze medal – third place	2025 Ahmedabad	69 kg

Harjinder Kaur (born 14 October 1996) is an Indian weightlifter. She won the silver medal in the 69 kg at the 2026 Commonwealth Games and the bronze medal in the 71 kg at the 2022 Commonwealth Games.

== Early life ==
Harjinder Kaur was born on 14 October 1996 in Mehas, near Nabha in Patiala district of Punjab. Her family worked as agricultural labourers, and she operated a chaff-cutter to prepare fodder for cattle. The manual labour helped build her upper-body strength. She initially began playing Kabaddi, and cycled 5 km (3.1 mi) daily to train for the same. However, her family faced financial constraints that prevented them from affording formal training. She took up weightlifting in 2016, while studying at Punjabi University in Patiala.

== Career ==
Harjinder Kaur won the silver medal in the women's 71 kg category in the 2021 Commonwealth Weightlifting Championships held at Tashkent, with a total lift of 211 kg (465 lb). She represented India at the 2022 Commonwealth Games in Birmingham. Competing in the women's 71 kg event, she lifted 93 kg (205 lb) in snatch and 119 kg (262 lb) in clean & jerk for a total of 212 kg (467 lb) to win the bronze medal.

In the 2026 Asian Weightlifting Championships in Gandhinagar, Harjinder Kaur won the bronze medal in snatch with a lift of 96 kg (212 lb) and finished fourth overall in the women's 69 kg event with a total lift of 217 kg (478 lb). She was part of the Indian contingent at the 2026 Commonwealth Games in Glasgow. In the women's 69 kg competition, she lifted 101 kg (223 lb) in snatch and 126 kg (278 lb) in the clean & jerk for a personal-best total of 227 kg (500 lb) to win the silver medal.
