= Thilanka Palangasinghe =

Sri Lankan weightlifter (born 1993)

Personal information
- Full name: Don Karolislage Thilanka Wiraj Kumara Palangasinghe
- Born: 26 October 1993 (age 32)
- Weight: 55.51 kg (122.4 lb)

Sport
- Country: Sri Lanka
- Sport: Weightlifting
- Weight class: 56 kg
- Team: National team
Medal record
Men's weightlifting
Representing Sri Lanka
Commonwealth Championships
Silver medal – second place	2013 Penang	56 kg
Silver medal – second place	2016 Penang	62 kg
Bronze medal – third place	2015 Pune	62 kg
Bronze medal – third place	2021 Tashkent	61 kg
- Updated on 16 January 2022

Don Karolislage Thilanka Wiraj Kumara Palangasinghe (born 26 October 1993), known as Thilanka Palangasinghe, is a Sri Lankan male weightlifter, competing in the 56 kg category and representing Sri Lanka at international competitions. He participated at the 2014 Commonwealth Games in the 56 kg event and at the 2018 Commonwealth Games competing in the 62kg event.

Palangasinghe represented Sri Lanka at the 2022 Commonwealth Games in Birmingham, England.

== Major competitions ==
Year	Venue	Weight	Snatch (kg)				Clean & Jerk (kg)				Total	Rank
Year	Venue	Weight	1	2	3	Rank	1	2	3	Rank	Total	Rank
Commonwealth Games
2014	Glasgow, Scotland	56 kg	105	~~109~~	~~109~~	—N/a	~~135~~	~~139~~	~~139~~	—N/a	0	---
