= Weightlifting at the 2022 Commonwealth Games – Men's 81 kg =

Weightlifting – Men's 81 kg at the 2022 Commonwealth Games
- Venue: National Exhibition Centre
- Dates: 1 August 2022
- Competitors: 12 from 12 nations
- Winning total weight: 325

Medalists
gold medal	Chris Murray	England
silver medal	Kyle Bruce	Australia
bronze medal	Nicolas Vachon	Canada

The Men's 81 kg weightlifting event at the 2022 Commonwealth Games took place at the National Exhibition Centre on 1 August 2022. The weightlifter from England won the gold, with a combined lift of 325 kg.

== Records ==
Prior to this competition, the existing world, Commonwealth and Games records were as follows:

World record	Snatch	Li Dayin (CHN)	175 kg	Tashkent, Uzbekistan	21 April 2021
World record	Clean & Jerk	Karlos Nasar (BUL)	208 kg	Tashkent, Uzbekistan	12 December 2021
World record	Total	Lü Xiaojun (CHN)	378 kg	Pattaya, Thailand	22 September 2019
Commonwealth record	Snatch	Alex Bellemarre (CAN)	154 kg	Guatemala City, Guatemala	18 June 2019
Commonwealth record	Clean & Jerk	Ajay Singh (IND)	190 kg	Apia, Samoa	12 July 2019
Commonwealth record	Total	Ajay Singh (IND)	338 kg	Apia, Samoa	12 July 2019
Games record	Snatch	Commonwealth Games Standard	147 kg		
Games record	Clean & Jerk	Commonwealth Games Standard	183 kg		
Games record	Total	Commonwealth Games Standard	323 kg		

The following records were established during the competition:

Total	325 kg	Chris Murray (ENG)	GR

When the previous records and weight classes were discarded following readjustment, the IWF defined "world standards" as the minimum lifts needed to qualify as world records (WR), CommonWealth Authority defined "Commonwealth standards" and "Commonwealth games standards" as the minimum lifts needed to qualify as Commonwealth record (CR) and Commonwealth games record (GR) in the new weight classes. Wherever World Standard/Commonwealth Standard/Commonwealth Games Standard appear in the list above, no qualified weightlifter has yet lifted the benchmark weights in a sanctioned competition.

== Schedule ==
All times are British Summer Time (UTC+1)

Date	Time	Round
Monday 1 August 2022	09:30	Final

== Results ==
Rank	Athlete	Body weight (kg)	Snatch (kg)				Clean & Jerk (kg)				Total
Rank	Athlete	Body weight (kg)	1	2	3	Result	1	2	3	Result	Total
1st place, gold medalist(s)	Chris Murray (ENG)	80.86	138	141	144	144	174	178	181	181	325 GR
2nd place, silver medalist(s)	Kyle Bruce (AUS)	80.99	143; OR	~~147~~	~~147~~	143	175	180; OR	~~183~~	180	323; OR
3rd place, bronze medalist(s)	Nicolas Vachon (CAN)	80.82	136	~~140~~	140	140	175	180	~~187~~	180	320
4	Ajay Singh (IND)	80.91	137	140	143	143	172	176	~~180~~	176	319
5	Haider Ali (PAK)	79.83	135	~~140~~	~~140~~	135	161	~~169~~	170	170	305
6	Cameron McTaggart (NZL)	80.95	135	138	~~141~~	138	165	~~170~~	~~170~~	165	303
7	Nasir Bin Roslan Mohamad (MAS)	80.02	135	~~140~~	~~140~~	135	165	~~170~~	~~170~~	165	300
8	Lim Kang Yin (SGP)	80.43	120	125	~~130~~	125	156	163	~~170~~	163	288
9	Chinthana Vidanage (SRI)	80.96	~~127~~	127	~~130~~	127	155	~~160~~	-	155	282
10	Jason Epton (SCO)	80.98	~~120~~	120	~~125~~	120	150	157	~~162~~	157	277
11	Omarie Mears (JAM)	80.61	120	123	126	126	141	147	~~151~~	147	273
-	Guy Michel Ngongang Tchuissi (CMR)	80.43	136	139	~~141~~	139	~~171~~	~~172~~	~~172~~	NM	DNF
