= Weightlifting at the 2018 Commonwealth Games – Women's 53 kg =

Weightlifting – Women's 53 kg at the 2018 Commonwealth Games
- Venue: Carrara Sports and Leisure Centre
- Dates: 6 April 2018
- Competitors: 14 from 14 nations
- Winning total weight: 192

Medalists
gold medal	Khumukcham Sanjita Chanu	India
silver medal	Dika Toua	Papua New Guinea
bronze medal	Rachel Leblanc-Bazinet	Canada

The Women's 53 kg weightlifting event at the 2018 Commonwealth Games took place at the Carrara Sports and Leisure Centre on 6 April 2018. The weightlifter from India won the gold, with a combined lift of 192 kg.

== Records ==
Prior to this competition, the existing world, Commonwealth and Games records were as follows:

World record	Snatch	Li Ping (CHN)	103 kg	Guangzhou, China	14 November 2010
World record	Clean & Jerk	Zulfiya Chinshanlo (KAZ)	134 kg	Almaty, Kazakhstan	10 November 2014
World record	Total	Hsu Shu-ching (TPE)	233 kg	Incheon, South Korea	21 September 2014
Commonwealth record	Snatch	Marilou Dozois-Prévost (CAN)	88 kg	Scarborough, Canada	22 May 2011
Commonwealth record	Clean & Jerk	Maryse Turcotte (CAN)	115 kg	Collingwood, Canada	19 May 2001
Commonwealth record	Total	Chinenye Fidelis (NGR)	202 kg	Nairobi, Kenya	31 March 2012
Games record	Snatch	Swarti Singh (IND)	83 kg	Glasgow, Scotland	25 July 2014
Games record	Clean & Jerk	Dika Toua (PNG)	111 kg	Glasgow, Scotland	25 July 2014
Games record	Total	Dika Toua (PNG)	193 kg	Glasgow, Scotland	25 July 2014

The following record was established during the competition.

Snatch	84	Khumukcham Sanjita Chanu (IND)	GR

== Schedule ==
All times are Australian Eastern Standard Time (UTC+10)

Date	Time	Round
Friday 6 April 2018	09:42	Final

== Results ==
Rank	Athlete	Body weight (kg)	Snatch (kg)				Clean & Jerk (kg)				Total
Rank	Athlete	Body weight (kg)	1	2	3	Result	1	2	3	Result	Total
1st place, gold medalist(s)	Khumukcham Sanjita Chanu (IND)	52.65	81	83	84	84	104	108	~~112~~	108	192
2nd place, silver medalist(s)	Dika Toua (PNG)	52.93	78	80	~~82~~	80	102	~~109~~	~~113~~	102	182
3rd place, bronze medalist(s)	Rachel Leblanc-Bazinet (CAN)	52.95	78	81	~~83~~	81	~~98~~	98	100	100	181
4	Chamari Warnakulasuriya (SRI)	52.80	74	78	~~80~~	78	94	~~99~~	~~104~~	94	172
5	Fraer Morrow (ENG)	52.97	71	73	~~75~~	73	92	95	99	99	172
6	Phillipa Patterson (NZL)	52.65	73	~~76~~	76	76	91	93	95	95	171
7	Sharifah Inani Najwa Syd Anuar (MAS)	52.83	75	~~78~~	~~78~~	75	95	~~101~~	~~101~~	95	170
8	Tegan Napper (AUS)	52.90	~~75~~	75	~~78~~	75	91	~~94~~	~~95~~	91	166
9	Mary Kini Lifu (SOL)	52.96	65	70	73	73	85	90	93	93	166
10	Ruth Baffoe (GHA)	52.44	73	75	77	77	85	88	~~90~~	88	165
11	Catrin Jones (WAL)	52.46	70	72	~~75~~	72	90	93	~~95~~	93	165
12	Fullapati Chakma (BAN)	52.60	62	66	68	68	80	85	~~86~~	85	153
	Liebon Akua (NRU)	52.89	53	56	58	58	~~63~~	~~68~~	~~69~~	–	–
	Fatima Yakubu (NGR)	52.93	~~74~~	~~77~~	~~77~~	—					DNF
