= 2015 World Weightlifting Championships – Women's 63 kg =

The women's 63 kilograms event at the 2015 World Weightlifting Championships was held on 24 and 25 November 2015 in Houston, United States.

== Schedule ==
Date	Time	Event
24 November 2015	14:00	Group C
25 November 2015	11:00	Group B
25 November 2015	17:25	Group A

== Medalists ==
Event	Gold		Silver		Bronze	
Snatch	Deng Wei (CHN)	113 kg	Tima Turieva (RUS)	112 kg	Karina Goricheva (KAZ)	112 kg
Clean & Jerk	Deng Wei (CHN)	146 kg	Choe Hyo-sim (PRK)	139 kg	Tima Turieva (RUS)	136 kg
Total	Deng Wei (CHN)	259 kg	Tima Turieva (RUS)	248 kg	Choe Hyo-sim (PRK)	243 kg

== Records ==
Prior to this competition, the existing world records were as follows.

World Record	Snatch	Svetlana Tsarukaeva (RUS)	117 kg	Paris, France	8 November 2011
World Record	Clean & Jerk	Lin Tzu-chi (TPE)	145 kg	Incheon, South Korea	23 September 2014
World Record	Total	Lin Tzu-chi (TPE)	261 kg	Incheon, South Korea	23 September 2014

== Results ==
Rank	Athlete	Group	Body weight	Snatch (kg)				Clean & Jerk (kg)				Total
Rank	Athlete	Group	Body weight	1	2	3	Rank	1	2	3	Rank	Total
1st place, gold medalist(s)	Deng Wei (CHN)	A	62.87	~~110~~	110	113	1st place, gold medalist(s)	140	146	—	1st place, gold medalist(s)	259
2nd place, silver medalist(s)	Tima Turieva (RUS)	A	62.86	108	~~112~~	112	2nd place, silver medalist(s)	136	~~141~~	~~141~~	3rd place, bronze medalist(s)	248
3rd place, bronze medalist(s)	Choe Hyo-sim (PRK)	A	62.24	104	~~107~~	~~107~~	8	~~136~~	136	139	2nd place, silver medalist(s)	243
4	Yuliya Kalina (UKR)	A	62.55	105	~~108~~	108	4	128	132	135	4	243
5	Karina Goricheva (KAZ)	A	62.87	~~108~~	108	112	3rd place, bronze medalist(s)	~~131~~	131	~~137~~	7	243
6	Lin Tzu-chi (TPE)	A	62.78	105	~~109~~	~~109~~	6	133	~~138~~	~~138~~	5	238
7	Pimsiri Sirikaew (THA)	A	61.21	100	104	~~108~~	7	128	~~132~~	132	6	236
8	Mercedes Pérez (COL)	A	62.96	97	~~103~~	~~103~~	12	125	130	~~137~~	8	227
9	Zoe Smith (GBR)	A	62.78	94	97	~~100~~	11	120	124	~~128~~	9	221
10	Eva Gurrola (MEX)	A	62.18	96	98	~~100~~	10	115	120	~~122~~	11	218
11	Olauwatoyin Adesanmi (NGR)	B	62.85	95	100	102	9	113	~~116~~	116	15	218
12	Giorgia Bordignon (ITA)	B	61.56	94	~~96~~	96	13	114	116	120	10	216
13	Rebekah Tiler (GBR)	A	62.66	~~93~~	93	~~96~~	17	118	~~121~~	~~122~~	13	211
14	Sinta Darmariani (INA)	B	62.59	~~89~~	89	~~93~~	21	114	119	~~123~~	12	208
15	Punam Yadav (IND)	B	62.95	88	91	94	15	110	114	~~117~~	16	208
16	Akane Yoshida (JPN)	B	61.59	88	91	93	16	110	113	~~115~~	17	206
17	Patricia Strenius (SWE)	B	62.83	85	88	~~91~~	25	115	~~118~~	118	14	206
18	Esraa El-Sayed (EGY)	B	62.38	~~95~~	~~95~~	95	14	110	~~114~~	—	24	205
19	Namika Matsumoto (JPN)	B	62.36	~~90~~	90	~~92~~	19	107	110	113	20	203
20	Mona Pretorius (RSA)	B	62.48	80	86	90	20	107	110	112	21	202
21	Mahassen Fattouh (LIB)	B	62.52	86	90	92	18	106	110	~~114~~	25	202
22	Marina Rodríguez (CUB)	C	61.84	85	88	~~91~~	22	108	113	~~116~~	18	201
23	Bruna Piloto (BRA)	B	61.87	87	~~90~~	~~90~~	27	113	~~115~~	~~116~~	19	200
24	Mehtap Kurnaz (TUR)	B	62.47	85	88	~~90~~	23	105	109	~~112~~	26	197
25	Anna Everi (FIN)	C	62.76	85	~~88~~	88	24	106	109	~~111~~	27	197
26	Clementina Agricole (SEY)	B	60.01	~~81~~	~~81~~	81	30	105	108	110	23	191
27	Silvia Artola (NCA)	C	62.95	75	80	~~83~~	32	105	108	111	22	191
28	Pip Malone (AUS)	B	61.70	83	87	~~89~~	26	~~102~~	~~102~~	102	28	189
29	Irene Martínez (ESP)	C	61.37	84	~~87~~	~~87~~	29	95	98	100	29	184
30	Jessica Lai (AUS)	C	62.58	~~82~~	82	86	28	93	~~97~~	98	33	184
31	Ganzorigiin Anuujin (MGL)	C	61.67	77	81	~~84~~	31	97	~~101~~	~~101~~	34	178
32	Hjördís Óskarsdóttir (ISL)	C	62.53	67	72	75	35	100	~~105~~	~~106~~	30	175
33	Tatia Lortkipanidze (GEO)	C	61.73	75	79	~~81~~	33	95	~~100~~	~~100~~	35	174
34	Jennifer Piter (ARU)	C	61.97	72	~~76~~	76	34	92	96	98	32	174
35	Alexandra Klatsia (CYP)	C	61.76	~~72~~	72	~~75~~	36	95	~~98~~	98	31	170
—	Ksenia Maksimova (RUS)	A	61.40	~~105~~	105	~~108~~	5	~~130~~	~~130~~	~~130~~	—	—

== New records ==
Clean & Jerk	146 kg	Deng Wei (CHN)	WR
