= Fraer Morrow =

English weightlifter (born 1998)

Personal information
- Full name: Fraer Letitia Morrow
- Born: 20 July 1998 (age 27) Doncaster, England
- Weight: 55 kg (121 lb)

Sport
- Country: Great Britain
- Sport: Weightlifting
- Event: –-53kg
Medal record
Women's weightlifting
Representing England
Commonwealth Games
Bronze medal – third place	2022 Birmingham	55 kg
Representing Great Britain
Women's weightlifting
European U23 Championships
Gold medal – first place	2021 Rovaniemi	55 kg
Silver medal – second place	2019 Bucharest	55 kg

Fraer Letitia Morrow (born 20 July 1998 in Doncaster) is an English weightlifter. She holds three British records at 55 kg and held two at 53 kg. In October 2019 she took 2 silvers and 1 gold medal at the European U23 championships in Romania.

== Major results ==
Year	Venue	Weight	Snatch (kg)				Clean & Jerk (kg)				Total	Rank
Year	Venue	Weight	1	2	3	Rank	1	2	3	Rank	Total	Rank
Representing Great Britain
World Championships
2017	Anaheim, United States	53 kg	69	~~72~~	~~72~~	18	87	90	94	19	163	17
European Championships
2022	Tirana, Albania	59 kg	87	~~90~~	~~90~~	9	109	~~112~~	113	4	200	5
British International Open
2019	(United Kingdom) Coventry, Great Britain	55 kg	~~78~~	78	~~81~~	3	97	100	102	2	180	2nd place, silver medalist(s)
European U23 Championships
2019	Bucharest, Romania	55 kg	80	~~82~~	~~82~~	2nd place, silver medalist(s)	100	104	107	1st place, gold medalist(s)	187	2nd place, silver medalist(s)
Representing England
Commonwealth Games
2018	Gold Coast, Australia	53 kg	71	73	~~75~~	9	92	95	99	4	172	5
2022	Birmingham, England	55 kg	86	89	~~91~~	2	~~109~~	109	~~115~~	3	198	3rd place, bronze medalist(s)

== Junior results ==
- 2017 European Junior Championships: 8th
- 2017 World Junior Championships: 9th
- 2016 European Junior Championships: 7th
