= Clementina Agricole =

Seychellois weightlifter (born 1988)

Clementina Ciana Agricole
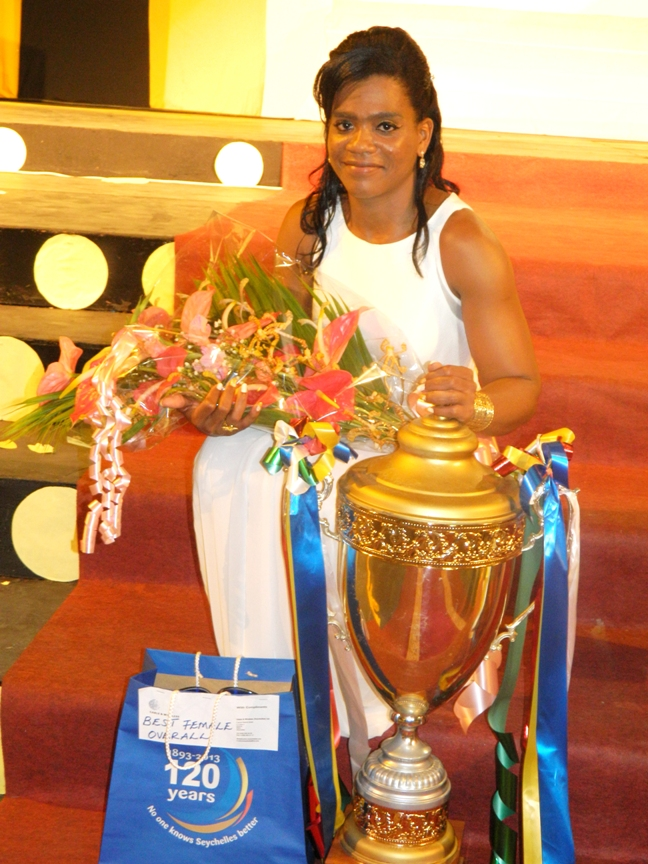

Personal information
- Born: 18 July 1988 (age 38)
- Weight: 62.3 kg (137 lb)

Sport
- Country: Seychelles
- Sport: Weightlifting
- Team: National team
Medal record
Representing Seychelles
Women's weightlifting
African Games
Bronze medal – third place	2007 Algiers	58 kg
Bronze medal – third place	2015 Brazzaville	63 kg
Commonwealth Championships
Gold medal – first place	2009 Penang	53 kg
Gold medal – first place	2017 Gold Coast	63 kg
Silver medal – second place	2013 Penang	58 kg
African Championships
Gold medal – first place	2017 Vacoas	63 kg
Silver medal – second place	2009 Kampala	53 kg
Bronze medal – third place	2016 Yaoundé	58 kg
- Updated on 28 January 2022

Clementina Ciana Agricole (born 18 July 1988) is a Seychellois female weightlifter, competing in the 58 kg (128 lb) and 63 kg (139 lb) category and representing Seychelles at international competitions. She competed at world championships, including at the 2015 World Weightlifting Championships. She won the bronze medal at the 2016 African Weightlifting Championships.

She was the flag bearer at the 2014 Commonwealth Games Parade of Nations.

== Career ==
Agricole entered the 2010 Commonwealth Games held in Delhi, India. Before the competition she had seen doctors about headaches she had been suffering which were put down to migraines. During the competition she suffered an elbow injury but managed to finish in fourth place. During the competition she was still having bad headaches, but while in the games village she lost her vision and blacked out. She was rushed to hospital where a scan showed a brain tumour. After undergoing an operation, she remained in Delhi for another 45 days to help her recovery. She underwent another major operation in November 2011. 12 months later she was declared fit to begin weightlifting again, and entered the National Championships in November 2012.

Since her return she came second at the 2013 Commonwealth Championships, fourth at the 2014 Commonwealth Games, and 26th at the 2015 World Weightlifting Championships. Agricole won three medals (one silver and two bronze) at the 2015 All-African Games held in Brazzaville, Republic of the Congo.

In 2015 she began to train with an American coach Kyle Pierce and ranked first at the IOIG. She won three medals in the 63 kg (139 lb) category (one silver and two bronze) at the 2015 African Games held in Brazzaville, Republic of the Congo with a 91 kg (201 lb) snatch, and a 115 kg (254 lb) clean and jerk. She ranked 26th at the World Weightlifting Championships. Despite winning three bronze medals at the African Weightlifting Championships in 2016, the Seychelles Weightlifting Association did not put Agricole on the team to participate to the Olympic Games. She stopped training with the national coach William Dixie and September 2016 began to train with a French-Lebanese coach and physical trainer, Zaher Hamdan, who had lived in Seychelles since 2007.

In March 2017 she was banned by the SWA for "misbehavior" and was not allowed compete in weightlifting locally or internationally. She hired a lawyer and had the decision revoked.

Despite not being permitted to compete in weightlifting she kept on training doing powerlifting with Hamdan, and after six months she managed to become the 2017 French Open Champion in weightlifting. She then participated in the African Championships and the Commonwealth Championships where she won the Gold medal.

In 2017 the International Weightlifting Federation banned nine countries for doping - Armenia, Azerbaijan, Belarus, China, Moldova, Kazakhstan, Russia, Turkey and Ukraine. In 2017, Agricole ranked amongst the top 10 athletes in the world in the 63 kg (139 lb) category in snatch, top three athletes in the world in 63 kg (139 lb) category in clean and jerk and in the top six in the world in the 63 kg (139 lb) category.

Agricole participated to the 2018 Commonwealth Games which was held in Gold Cost, Australia. Six weeks before the competition she had an injection of cortisone in her right shoulder. In the competition she suffered a dislocated shoulder in her third attempt in snatch after doing 85 kg (187 lb) with her second snatch and then failed on all of her attempts in clean and jerk. She was rushed to hospital where a scan showed two tears on the supraspinatus muscles and on the biceps tendons. She underwent an operation and remained in Gold Cost for another two weeks before being allowed to return home.

== Awards ==
In 2014, she won the Seychelles Sportswoman of the Year Award for the second consecutive year. Eleven years earlier she had won the Young Female Athlete of the Year Award, and she has twice won the Seychelles Female Lifter of the Year in 2009 and 2013.

== Major results ==
Year	Venue	Weight	Snatch (kg)				Clean & jerk (kg)				Total	Rank
Year	Venue	Weight	1	2	3	Rank	1	2	3	Rank	Total	Rank
World Championships
2015	Houston, United States	63 kg	~~81~~	~~81~~	81	30	105	108	110	23	191	26
African Championships
2016	Yaoundé, Cameroon	58 kg	77	~~80~~	~~80~~	3rd place, bronze medalist(s)	98	~~101~~	101	3rd place, bronze medalist(s)	178	3rd place, bronze medalist(s)
2017	Vacoas, Mauritius	63 kg	80	84	86	1st place, gold medalist(s)	105	107	~~112~~	1st place, gold medalist(s)	193	1st place, gold medalist(s)
Commonwealth Championships
2017	Gold Coast, Australia	63 kg	80	~~85~~	85	1st place, gold medalist(s)	110	~~115~~	115	1st place, gold medalist(s)	200	1st place, gold medalist(s)
Commonwealth Games
2018	Gold Coast, Australia	63 kg	~~81~~	~~85~~	86	4	~~107~~	~~108~~	~~110~~	—	—	—
2014	Glasgow, Scotland	58 kg	~~85~~	85	88	4	~~111~~	111	~~116~~	3	199	4
2010	Delhi, India	58 kg	83	~~87~~	87	2	100	~~105~~	—	7	187	4
