= Sarah Davies (weightlifter) =

British weightlifter (born 1992)

Sarah Davies OLY
Personal information
- Born: 19 August 1992 (age 34) Preston, United Kingdom
- Employer: Wisdom 4 Weightlifting
- Height: 162 cm (5 ft 4 in)
- Weight: 64 kg (141 lb)

Sport
- Country: England; Great Britain
- Sport: Weightlifting
- Weight class: 64kg
- Club: Atlas Weightlifting Club
- Team: National team
- Coached by: Cyril Martin and Dave Sawyer

Achievements and titles
- Personal bests: 101kg Snatch 125kg Clean and Jerk
Medal record
Women's weightlifting
Representing Great Britain
World Championships
| Silver medal – second place | 2021 Tashkent | 71 kg |
European Championships
| Gold medal – first place | 2025 Chișinău | 64 kg |
| Gold medal – first place | 2026 Batumi | 63 kg |
| Silver medal – second place | 2021 Moscow | 64 kg |
European U23 Championships
| Silver medal – second place | 2015 Klaipeda | 63 kg |
Representing England
Commonwealth Games
| Gold medal – first place | 2022 Birmingham | 71 kg |
| Silver medal – second place | 2018 Gold Coast | 69 kg |
Commonwealth Championships
| Bronze medal – third place | 2017 Gold Coast | 69 kg |
- Updated on 28 January 2022

Sarah Davies (born 19 August 1992) is a British weightlifter, competing in the 64 kg and 69 kg categories internationally and representing England and Great Britain at international competitions. She is a Commonwealth Games champion at 71 kg from 2022, and a double European Champion at 64 kg from 2025, and 63 kg in 2026. She won the silver medal in the women's 71 kg event at the 2021 World Weightlifting Championships held in Tashkent, Uzbekistan.

== Beauty pageantry ==
Before her weightlifting career, Davies was active in beauty pageantry, winning the Miss Leeds title.

== Weightlifting career ==
She has competed at five world championships and five European Senior Championships. She was the first British person to win the European u23 Championships in 2015. She competed in the 2014 and 2018 Commonwealth Games representing England and won the silver medal at the 2018 Games. Davies started weightlifting in September 2011 and made her international debut after just two and a half years of training in the sport.

Davies won silver medals representing England at the 2018 Commonwealth Games (-69 kg)and Great Britain at the 2019 European Weightlifting Championships (-64 kg).

Davies won a silver medal at the 2021 European Weightlifting Championships in Moscow, again representing Great Britain.

In November 2021, Davies became the first British person to win a World silver medal by taking silver in the clean and jerk as well as the total.

On 12 April 2022, Davies was sanctioned by British Weight Lifting after she admitted she had made comments of a racial discriminatory nature against a fellow athlete. As part of the sanction, Davies was deselected from representing Great Britain & England for a period of three months, which included the 2022 European Weightlifting Championships held in Tirana, Albania. BWL also called for Davies to resign from her role as Chair of the International Weightlifting Federation's Athletes' Commission with immediate effect. Davies has since stepped down from her position as chair of the IWF Athletes' Commission.

Davies won Gold medals representing England at the 2022 Commonwealth Games (-71 kg).

Davies is the current holder of 6 British records across 2 different weight classes.

== Major results ==
| Year | Venue | Weight | Snatch (kg) | | | | Clean & Jerk (kg) | | | | Total | Rank |
| Year | Venue | Weight | 1 | 2 | 3 | Rank | 1 | 2 | 3 | Rank | Total | Rank |
Representing Great Britain
Olympic Games
| 2021 | Tokyo, Japan | 64 kg | 97 | ~~100~~ | 100 | —N/a | ~~127~~ | 127 | ~~133~~ | —N/a | 227 | 5 |
World Championships
| 2014 | Almaty, Kazakhstan | 63 kg | 83 | 86 | ~~90~~ | 29 | 105 | ~~108~~ | ~~109~~ | 28 | 191 | 29 |
| 2015 | Houston, United States | 69 kg | 86 | 89 | ~~91~~ | 34 | ~~113~~ | 113 | ~~117~~ | 27 | 202 | 30 |
| 2017 | Anaheim, United States | 63 kg | 88 | ~~91~~ | ~~93~~ | 15 | 118 | 121 | ~~124~~ | 6 | 209 | 6 |
| 2018 | Ashgabat, Turkmenistan | 64 kg | 92 | 94 | ~~95~~ | 16 | 118 | 121 | 123 | 8 | 217 | 15 |
| 2019 | Pattaya, Thailand | 64 kg | 95 | 98 | ~~100~~ | 11 | 124 | ~~129~~ | ~~130~~ | 9 | 222 | 8 |
| 2021 | Tashkent, Uzbekistan | 71 kg | 96 | 99 | 102 | 7 | 126 | 129 | 132 | 2nd place, silver medalist(s) | 234 | 2nd place, silver medalist(s) |
European Championships
| 2014 | Tel Aviv, Israel | 63 kg | ~~80~~ | 80 | 84 | 14 | 104 | ~~108~~ | ~~109~~ | 11 | 188 | 11 |
| 2015 | Tbilisi, Georgia | 58 kg | 82 | ~~86~~ | ~~86~~ | 10 | ~~106~~ | 106 | ~~110~~ | 9 | 188 | 9 |
| 2016 | Førde, Norway | 58 kg | 83 | 86 | ~~88~~ | 7 | ~~106~~ | 106 | ~~109~~ | 11 | 192 | 7 |
| 2017 | Split, Croatia | 63 kg | ~~87~~ | 87 | 90 | 8 | 112 | 115 | 118 | 4 | 208 | 5 |
| 2019 | Batumi, Georgia | 64 kg | 93 | 96 | 98 | 5 | 121 | ~~125~~ | 125 | 4 | 223 | 4 |
| 2021 | Moscow, Russia | 64 kg | 96 | 98 | 101 | 2nd place, silver medalist(s) | 122 | 126 | 129 | 2nd place, silver medalist(s) | 230 | 2nd place, silver medalist(s) |
| 2025 | Chișinău, Moldova | 64 kg | ~~96~~ | 96 | ~~99~~ | 6 | 123 | 125 | 127 | 1st place, gold medalist(s) | 223 | 1st place, gold medalist(s) |
British International Open
| 2019 | Coventry, Great Britain | 64 kg | 96 | 99 | 101 | 1 | ~~123~~ | 123 | ~~127~~ | 2 | 224 | 2nd place, silver medalist(s) |
Representing England
Commonwealth Games
| 2022 | Birmingham, England | 71 kg | 97 | 101 | 103 | 1 | ~~126~~ | 126 | ~~130~~ | 1 | 229 | (gold) |
| 2018 | Gold Coast, Australia | 69 kg | 92 | ~~95~~ | 95 | 4 | 119 | 122 | ~~128~~ | 1 | 217 | 2nd place, silver medalist(s) |
| 2014 | Glasgow, Scotland | 63 kg | ~~83~~ | ~~83~~ | 83 | 6 | ~~105~~ | 105 | ~~110~~ | 7 | 188 | 7 |
Commonwealth Championships
| 2017 | Gold Coast, Australia | 69 kg | 89 | ~~92~~ | 92 | 3 | ~~115~~ | 115 | 120 | 3 | 212 | 3rd place, bronze medalist(s) |
