= Owen Boxall =

British weightlifter

Personal information
- Full name: Owen Gordon Edward Boxall
- Weight: 93.03 kg (205.1 lb)

Sport
- Country: Great Britain
- Sport: Weightlifting
- Team: National team
- Coached by: Andrew Callard
Medal record
Men's weightlifting
Representing England
Commonwealth Games
Bronze medal – third place	2018 Gold Coast	105 kg
Commonwealth Championships
Gold medal – first place	2016 Penang	105 kg
- Updated on 30 January 2022

Owen Gordon Edward Boxall is an English male weightlifter, competing in the 94 kg category and representing England and Great Britain at international competitions. He represented England at the 2014 Commonwealth Games in the 94 kg class and England at the 2018 Commonwealth Games in the 105 kg class, where he won a bronze medal. He has also competed at the 2014 World Weightlifting Championships in the 94 kg class and the 2017 World Weightlifting Championships in the 105 kg class. His coach is Andrew Callard.

== Major results ==
Year	Venue	Weight	Snatch (kg)					Clean & Jerk (kg)					Total	Rank
Year	Venue	Weight	1	2	3	Result	Rank	1	2	3	Result	Rank	Total	Rank
Representing Great Britain
World Championships
2018	Ashgabat, Turkmenistan	102 kg	148	~~152~~	~~154~~	148	15	~~183~~	~~183~~	—	—	—	—	—
2017	Anaheim, United States	105 kg	147	~~151~~	~~151~~	147	24	180	185	~~190~~	185	24	332	23
2014	Almaty, Kazakhstan	94 kg	143	148	~~151~~	148	31	173	178	~~183~~	178	30	326	29
European Championships
2016	Førde, Norway	94 kg	137	~~141~~	~~141~~	137	24	165	170	175	175	19	312	19
2014	Tel Aviv, Israel	94 kg	135	140	145	145	14	170	175	180	180	11	325	12
British International Open
2019	(United Kingdom) Coventry, Great Britain	109 kg	150	~~157~~	~~160~~	150	3	~~190~~	190	200	200	3	350	3rd place, bronze medalist(s)
Representing England
Commonwealth Games
2018	Gold Coast, Australia	105 kg	~~152~~	~~152~~	152	152	2	191	197	199	199	4	351	3rd place, bronze medalist(s)
2014	Glasgow, Scotland	94 kg	~~144~~	144	150	150	2	176	181	~~185~~	181	4	331	4
Commonwealth Championships
2016	Penang, Malaysia	105 kg	—N/a	—N/a	—N/a	158	1	—N/a	—N/a	—N/a	195	2	353	1st place, gold medalist(s)
2015	Pune, India	94 kg	147	152	~~157~~	152	1	—	—	—	—	—	—	—
2013	Penang, Malaysia	94 kg	—N/a	—N/a	—N/a	142	6	—N/a	—N/a	—N/a	178	6	320	6
