= Bindyarani Devi Sorokhaibam =

Indian weightlifter (born 1999)

Personal information
- Born: 27 January 1999 (age 27) Imphal West, Manipur, India
Medal record
Women's weightlifting
Representing India
World Championships
Gold medal – first place	2021 Tashkent	55 kg (C&J)
World Cup
Bronze medal – third place	2024 Phuket	55 kg
Asian Championships
Silver medal – second place	2023 Jinju	55 kg
Commonwealth Games
Silver medal – second place	2022 Birmingham	55 kg
Bronze medal – third place	2026 Glasgow	58 kg
Commonwealth Championships
Gold medal – first place	2019 Apia	55 kg
Silver medal – second place	2021 Tashkent	55 kg
Silver medal – second place	2025 Ahmedabad	58 kg
South Asian Games
Gold medal – first place	2019 Kathmandu	55 kg

Bindyarani Devi Sorokhaibam (born 27 January 1999) is an Indian weightlifter.

== Career ==
She won gold at the 2019 Commonwealth Weightlifting Championships and silver at the 2021 Commonwealth Weightlifting Championships. She also won gold in clean and jerk at the 2021 World Weightlifting Championships.

She won the silver medal at the 2022 Commonwealth Games with a total lift of 202 kg. She also broke Games record and national record in clean and jerk by lifting 116 kg.
