= Weightlifting at the 2022 Commonwealth Games – Women's 71 kg =

Weightlifting – Women's 71 kg at the 2022 Commonwealth Games
- Venue: National Exhibition Centre
- Dates: 1 August
- Competitors: 12 from 12 nations
- Winning total: 229 kg

Medalists
gold medal	Sarah Davies	England
silver medal	Alexis Ashworth	Canada
bronze medal	Harjinder Kaur	India

The women's 71 kg weightlifting event at the 2022 Commonwealth Games took place at the National Exhibition Centre on 1 August 2022. The weightlifter from England won the gold, with a combined lift of 229 kg.

== Records ==
Prior to this competition, the existing World, Commonwealth and Games records were as follows:
When the previous records and weight classes were discarded following readjustment, the IWF defined "world standards" as the minimum lifts needed to qualify as world records (WR), CommonWealth Authority defined "Commonwealth standards" and "Commonwealth games standards" as the minimum lifts needed to qualify as Commonwealth record (CR) and Commonwealth games record (GR) in the new weight classes. Wherever World Standard/Commonwealth Standard/Commonwealth Games Standard appear in the list below, no qualified weightlifter has yet lifted the benchmark weights in a sanctioned competition.

World record	Snatch	World Standard	117 kg		
World record	Clean & Jerk	Zhang Wangli (CHN)	152 kg	Ashgabat, Turkmenistan	6 November 2018
World record	Total	Zhang Wangli (CHN)	267 kg	Ashgabat, Turkmenistan	6 November 2018
Commonwealth record	Snatch	Sarah Davies (ENG)	102 kg	Tashkent, Uzbekistan	13 December 2021
Commonwealth record	Clean & Jerk	Sarah Davies (ENG)	132 kg	Tashkent, Uzbekistan	13 December 2021
Commonwealth record	Total	Sarah Davies (ENG)	234 kg	Tashkent, Uzbekistan	13 December 2021
Games record	Snatch	Commonwealth Games Standard	98 kg		
Games record	Clean & Jerk	Commonwealth Games Standard	123 kg		
Games record	Total	Commonwealth Games Standard	219 kg		

The following records were established during the competition:

Snatch	103 kg	Sarah Davies (ENG)	CR, GR
Clean & Jerk	126 kg	Sarah Davies (ENG)	GR
Total	229 kg	Sarah Davies (ENG)	GR

== Schedule ==
All times are British Summer Time (UTC+1)

Date	Time	Round
Monday 1 August 2022	18:30	Final

== Results ==
Rank	Athlete	Body weight (kg)	Snatch (kg)				Clean & Jerk (kg)				Total
Rank	Athlete	Body weight (kg)	1	2	3	Result	1	2	3	Result	Total
1st place, gold medalist(s)	Sarah Davies (ENG)	70.58	97	101	103	103; CR, GR	~~126~~	126	~~130~~	126 GR	229 GR
2nd place, silver medalist(s)	Alexis Ashworth (CAN)	70.20	~~91~~	91	~~94~~	91	112	116	123	123	214
3rd place, bronze medalist(s)	Harjinder Kaur (IND)	69.14	~~90~~	90	93	93	113	116	119	119	212
4	Kiana Rose Elliott (AUS)	67.39	~~90~~	90	94	94	105	108	110	110	204
5	Nancy Genzel Abouke (NRU)	68.40	87	~~90~~	~~90~~	87	110	~~114~~	~~114~~	110	197
6	Megan Signal (NZL)	70.73	~~88~~	88	~~92~~	88	108	~~111~~	~~112~~	108	196
7	Ketty Lent (MRI)	70.29	82	87	~~90~~	87	107	~~111~~	~~111~~	107	194
8	Roberta Tabone (MLT)	69.97	82	84	86	86	101	105	~~108~~	105	191
9	Faye Pittman (WAL)	70.22	81	~~84~~	~~84~~	81	105	~~108~~	108	108	189
10	Holly O'Shea (GIB)	68.75	70	74	~~76~~	74	89	93	97	97	171
—	Joy Ogbonne Eze (NGR)	69.79	95	100	~~103~~	100	~~125~~	~~125~~	~~125~~	—	DNF
—	Alice Aitchison (SCO)	69.88	~~82~~	~~82~~	~~82~~	—	—	—	—	—	DNF
