= Nicolas Vachon =

Canadian weightlifter (born 1996)

Personal information
- Full name: Nicolas Vachon
- Born: 5 July 1996 (age 30)
- Weight: 68.91 kg (151.9 lb)

Sport
- Country: Canada
- Sport: Weightlifting
- Weight class: 69 kg
- Team: National team
Medal record
Weightlifting
Representing Canada
Commonwealth Games
Bronze medal – third place	2022 Birmingham	Men's 81 kg
- Updated on 1 August 2022

Nicolas Vachon (born 5 July 1996) is a Canadian male weightlifter, competing in the 69 kg category and representing Canada at international competitions. He participated at the 2014 Commonwealth Games in the 69 kg event.

Vachon also competed at the 2018 Commonwealth Games, and finally won a medal (a bronze) in his third appearance at the 2022 Commonwealth Games.

== Major competitions ==
Year	Venue	Weight	Snatch (kg)				Clean & Jerk (kg)				Total	Rank
Year	Venue	Weight	1	2	3	Rank	1	2	3	Rank	Total	Rank
Commonwealth Games
2014	Glasgow, Scotland	69 kg	110	~~114~~	~~114~~	—N/a	135	~~140~~	140	—N/a	250	13
