= Alexis Ashworth =

Canadian weightlifter (born 1999)

Personal information
- Born: 24 January 1999 (age 27)

Sport
- Sport: Weightlifting
Medal record
Women's weightlifting
Representing Canada
Commonwealth Games
Silver medal – second place	2022 Birmingham	71 kg

Alexis Ashworth (born 24 January 1999) is a Canadian weightlifter. She is from Saskatchewan hamlet of Oungre in Canada. She won the silver medal in weightlifting at the 2022 Commonwealth Games in the women's 71kg category.
