= Rachel Leblanc-Bazinet =

Canadian weightlifter (born 1988)

Personal information
- Nationality: Canadian
- Born: 10 October 1988 (age 38)

Sport
- Sport: Weightlifting
Medal record
Weightlifting
Representing Canada
Commonwealth Games
| Bronze medal – third place | 2018 Gold Coast | Women's 53 kg |

Rachel Leblanc-Bazinet (born 10 October 1988) is a Canadian weightlifter. She competed in the women's 53 kg event at the 2018 Commonwealth Games, winning the bronze medal. At the 2019 Pan American Games, Leblanc-Bazinet finished in fifth place in the 55 kg event. In June 2021, Leblanc-Bazinet was named in Canada's Olympic team.
