= British Weight Lifting =

UK's national governing body for weightlifting

- Sport: Weightlifting; Para powerlifting
- Jurisdiction: United Kingdom
- Abbreviation: BWL
- Founded: 1910
- Affiliation: IWF
- Regional affiliation: EWF
- Headquarters: Leeds, West Yorkshire
- President: Angus Kinnear
- CEO: Matthew Curtain

Official website
- britishweightlifting.org

British Weight Lifting (BWL) is a trading name of the British Weight Lifters' Association Ltd (BWLA), the National Governing Body (NGB) in the United Kingdom for the sports of weightlifting and para powerlifting. The Association was initially established in 1910. From 1911 to 2003 its name was the British Amateur Weight Lifters' Association (BAWLA); and in 1957, it was incorporated as a limited company.

BWL support a large network of weightlifting bodies, clubs and gyms across the United Kingdom, as well as the thousands of people actively involved in Olympic and Paralympic weightlifting disciplines and people at every level of weight bearing activity. As a sport NGB, they are also committed to and responsible for greater inclusivity, improved governance, improved performance and being globally successful, winning medals at Olympics, Paralympics, World and Commonwealth events.

== Overview ==
BWL is responsible for developing participation and performance in the sports of weightlifting (also known as "olympic weightlifting") and para-powerlifting in the United Kingdom and to offer greater opportunities for a wider and more diverse range of lifters of all ages and abilities.

They operate several initiatives aimed at encouraging people to learn the fundamental movement skills in olympic weightlifting and for all sport and physical activities. This includes coordinating and facilitating the set-up, running and growth of club infrastructure from national, regional, and sub-regional level.

Initiatives include regular campaigns aimed at encouraging people to start lifting. In 2018 they partnered with Oomph! to help tackle inactivity in people over the age of 55. In 2019, Women in Sport and BWL launched Strong Is Not A Size, to empower women to step into the weights areas of gym.

== History ==
Weightlifting began to become an organised sport in the United Kingdom in the late 1800s, with the Amateur Athletic Association (formed 1880), the Amateur Gymnastics Association (formed 1888), and the Wrestling Society.

In 1910, the British Weight Lifters' Association was established in order to bring all amateur weightlifters into a united self-governing body. The new association was refounded in 1911 as the British Amateur Weight Lifters' Association (BAWLA).

Today, the sport of competitive weightlifting (also known as "Olympic-style weightlifting") comprises two lifts: the snatch, and the two-part clean-and-jerk. But in the early years of organised amateur competitions there were many different types of lifts. In the 1960s and 70s, the competitive sport of powerlifting consolidated around the squat, bench press, and deadlift. The BAWLA ran a powerlifting section, and was a founder member of the International Powerlifting Federation (founded 1972), and was the UK's original governing body for powerlifting. Later BAWLA's powerlifting section re-organised as an independent organisation – the GB Powerlifting Federation Ltd (incorporated in 2008, and trading as British Powerlifting) – with BAWLA remaining the governing body for Olympic-style weightlifting and for para powerlifting, which made its debut in the 1964 Paralympic Games in Tokyo.

In 2003, the Association returned to its original name of the British Weight Lifters' Association (BWLA), and today is known by its trading name of British Weight Lifting.

== Competitions ==
The BWL competition programme has three tiers.

Competitions are set up for all age groups and weight categories from school age to masters (over 35's). Age groups for national competitions are, School Age, University and Colleges, Youth, Junior, U23 and Senior – Masters is 35+.

=== Tier 1 'British Championships' ===
Tier 1 is the highest standard of weightlifting in the UK and competitions are organised directly by BWL. Lifters from anywhere in the UK are eligible to compete. They must have met the qualification standard at any Tier 2 or Tier 3 competition.

=== Tier 2 'Home Nation Championships' ===
Each UK Home Nation (England, Scotland, Wales, and Northern Ireland) is responsible for its own national championships. All Tier 2 competitions hold equal standing across all four Home Nations. Most Tier 2 competitions have qualification standards to take part.

=== Tier 3 'Ranking Events' ===
Any club with a 'Licensed Club' affiliation to BWL or a Home Nation federation can apply to run a Tier 3 competition. Results feature on the BWL rankings list. This tier is suitable for both novice and experienced lifters and can be entered to qualify for Tier 1 and 2 competitions.

Competitions	Tiers
Regional Open Series	3
Age Group Championships	2
British Championships	1
England Championships	1
British Universities and Colleges Championships	1

=== International qualification pathways ===
BWL outlines qualification pathways for weightlifters aspiring to enter the international competitions of the Olympics, Paralympics and Commonwealth Games. BWL's athlete selection is determined by the totals lifted at specific competitions and by a selection panel.

== Home Nations federations ==
British Weight Lifting supports weightlifting and para-powerlifting in each of the UK's four Home Nations – England, Scotland, Wales, and Northern Ireland – in partnership with the governing bodies specific to each home nation.

In Wales, the governing body for both sports is the Welsh Weightlifting Federation Ltd (incorporated 2013), which trades as Welsh Weightlifting (Welsh: Codi Pwysau Cymru). In 2020, BWL and Welsh Weightlifting merged their memberships, with joint membership of both organisations for lifters in Wales.

The governing body in Scotland is Weightlifting Scotland (incorporated 2005). In Northern Ireland it is Northern Ireland Weightlifting. The governing body for England is organised as a sub-committee of British Weight Lifting. It is known externally as England Weight Lifting and internally as the England group.

== Courses and certifications ==
BWL deliver practical and online training programmes to weightlifters, coaches, instructors, and technical officials. Courses to help weightlifters improve technique and performance include Olympic Lifting Masterclass and Strength Training Masterclass. BWL's other programmes include: Continued Professional Development (CPD) courses; the British Weight Lifting DiSE programme—a Diploma in Sporting Excellence; and coaching courses and official licensing.

BWL run talent pathways for Olympic hopefuls, and participates in Sport Englands's Talented Athlete Scholarship Scheme (TASS). The first national youth squad took place in Loughborough, 2016, at which 12 young lifters were selected to attend BWL training camps throughout the year.

At the 2017 UK Coaching Awards, British Weight Lifting won UK Coaching's Coaching Culture of the Year Award – a shared win with England Rugby.

== Para powerlifting ==
Para Powerlifting made its debut at the 1964 Paralympic Games in Tokyo, featuring a handful of male competitors with spinal cord injuries. The sport now has hundreds of elite male and female participants from a variety of disability groups, representing more than 110 countries.

At the 2020, Road to Tokyo Para Powerlifting World Cup, Britain finished with four gold, two silver and three bronze medals.

Para powerlifting became part of British Universities and Colleges Sport programme for the first time in 2021.
