= Ajay Singh (weightlifter) =

Indian weightlifter (born 1997)

Personal information
- Full name: Ajay Singh Shekhawat
- Nationality: Indian
- Born: 17 April 1997 (age 29) Rajasthan, India

Sport
- Sport: Weightlifting
- Event: 81 kg
Medal record
Men's weightlifting
Representing India
Commonwealth Weightlifting Championships
Gold medal – first place	2019 Apia	81 kg
Gold medal – first place	2021 Tashkent	81 kg
Gold medal – first place	2023 Noida	81 kg
Commonwealth Junior Weightlifting Championships
Gold medal – first place	2015 Houston	77 kg
Gold medal – first place	2016 Penang	77 kg
Silver medal – second place	2017 Gold Coast	77 kg
Asian Youth and Junior Weightlifting Championships
Bronze medal – third place	2017 Kathmandu	77 kg

Ajay Singh (born 17 April 1997) is an Indian weightlifter who competes in the 81 kg weight class. He is a two-time Commonwealth Championships gold medalist. Singh lifted a total of 322 kg and also set a national record in Snatch round of 146 kg in 2021 Tashkent.

In 2023, he won the gold medal in the men's 81 kg category at the 2023 Commonwealth Weightlifting Championships held at Noida.
