= Chris Murray (weightlifter) =

British weightlifter

Personal information
- Full name: Christopher John Murray
- Nationality: British
- Born: 5 February 1999 (age 27)

Sport
- Country: Great Britain / England
- Sport: Weightlifting
- Weight class: –81kg
Medal record
Men's weightlifting
Representing England
Commonwealth Games
Gold medal – first place	2022 Birmingham	81 kg
Bronze medal – third place	2026 Glasgow	79 kg
Representing Great Britain
European U23 Championships
Silver medal – second place	2022 Durrës	81 kg

Christopher John Murray (born 5 February 1999) is a British weightlifter competing in the 81 kg weight class. He won gold competing for England at the 2022 Commonwealth Games.

== Career ==
Murray won his first international medal when he received a bronze in the 62 Kg category at the 2015 Commonwealth Youth Games held in Samoa.

Murray first won gold (77 kg class) at the British Weight Lifting Championships in 2018, and has also won in 2019, 2021 and 2022.

In 2022, Murray set a new Commonwealth record when he lifted a total of 325 kg to win gold in the 81 kg category at the 2022 Commonwealth Games held in Birmingham.
