= World record progression women's weightlifting (2018–2025) =

This is a list of world records progression in women's weightlifting from 2018 to 2025. These records are maintained in each weight class for the snatch lift, clean and jerk lift, and the total for both lifts.

The International Weightlifting Federation restructured its weight classes in 2018, nullifying earlier records and again in 2025.

== 45 kg ==
=== Snatch ===
Athlete	Record (kg)	Date	Meet	Place	Ref.
World Standard	85	1 November 2018	—	—	
(North Korea) Won Hyon-sim	86	3 February 2024	Asian Championships	Tashkent	
(North Korea) Won Hyon-sim	87	31 March 2024	World Cup	Phuket	
(China) Zhao Jinhong	88	9 May 2025	Asian Championships	Jiangshan	
(China) Zhao Jinhong	90	9 May 2025	Asian Championships	Jiangshan	

=== Clean & Jerk ===
Athlete	Record (kg)	Date	Meet	Place	Ref.
World Standard	108	1 November 2018	—	—	
(North Korea) Won Hyon-sim	109	31 March 2024	World Cup	Phuket	
(China) Zhao Jinhong	110	6 December 2024	World Championships	Manama	
(China) Zhao Jinhong	113	6 December 2024	World Championships	Manama	

=== Total ===
Athlete	Record (kg)	Date	Meet	Place	Ref.
World Standard	191	1 November 2018	—	—	
(North Korea) Won Hyon-sim	192	3 February 2024	Asian Championships	Tashkent	
(North Korea) Won Hyon-sim	193	31 March 2024	World Cup	Phuket	
(North Korea) Won Hyon-sim	196	31 March 2024	World Cup	Phuket	
(China) Zhao Jinhong	197	6 December 2024	World Championships	Manama	
(China) Zhao Jinhong	200	6 December 2024	World Championships	Manama	

== 49 kg ==
=== Snatch ===
Athlete	Record (kg)	Date	Meet	Place	Ref.
World Standard	90	1 November 2018	—	—	
(China) Jiang Huihua	92	3 November 2018	World Championships	Ashgabat	
(Thailand) Sopita Tanasan ^{[a]}	~~93~~	3 November 2018	World Championships	Ashgabat	
(China) Hou Zhihui ^{[b]}	93	3 November 2018	World Championships	Ashgabat	
(China) Hou Zhihui	94	23 February 2019	World Cup	Fuzhou	
(China) Hou Zhihui	95	6 July 2019	Olympics Test Event	Tokyo	
(China) Hou Zhihui	96	17 April 2021	Asian Championships	Tashkent	
(China) Hou Zhihui	97	1 April 2024	World Cup	Phuket	

=== Clean & Jerk ===
Athlete	Record (kg)	Date	Meet	Place	Ref.
World Standard	115	1 November 2018	—	—	
(Thailand) Chayuttra Pramongkhol ^{[a]}	~~120~~	3 November 2018	World Championships	Ashgabat	
(China) Hou Zhihui ^{[b]}	116	23 February 2019	World Cup	Fuzhou	
(China) Hou Zhihui ^{[b]}	117	19 September 2019	World Championships	Pattaya	
(China) Jiang Huihua ^{[c]}	118	19 September 2019	World Championships	Pattaya	
(India) Mirabai Chanu	119	17 April 2021	Asian Championships	Tashkent	
(China) Jiang Huihua	120	5 September 2023	World Championships	Riyadh	
(North Korea) Ri Song-gum	122	30 September 2023	Asian Games	Hangzhou	
(North Korea) Ri Song-gum	124	30 September 2023	Asian Games	Hangzhou	
(North Korea) Ri Song-gum	125	4 February 2024	Asian Championships	Tashkent	

=== Total ===
Athlete	Record (kg)	Date	Meet	Place	Ref.
World Standard	203	1 November 2018	—	—	
(China) Hou Zhihui	205	3 November 2018	World Championships	Ashgabat	
(China) Jiang Huihua	206	3 November 2018	World Championships	Ashgabat	
(China) Hou Zhihui	208	3 November 2018	World Championships	Ashgabat	
(Thailand) Chayuttra Pramongkhol ^{[a]}	~~209~~	3 November 2018	World Championships	Ashgabat	
(China) Hou Zhihui	210	23 February 2019	World Cup	Fuzhou	
(China) Hou Zhihui	211	19 September 2019	World Championships	Pattaya	
(China) Jiang Huihua	212	19 September 2019	World Championships	Pattaya	
(China) Hou Zhihui	213	17 April 2021	Asian Championships	Tashkent	
(China) Jiang Huihua	215	5 September 2023	World Championships	Riyadh	
(North Korea) Ri Song-gum	216	30 September 2023	Asian Games	Hangzhou	
(North Korea) Ri Song-gum	217	4 February 2024	Asian Championships	Tashkent	
(North Korea) Ri Song-gum	220	4 February 2024	Asian Championships	Tashkent	
(North Korea) Ri Song-gum	221	1 April 2024	World Cup	Phuket	

== 55 kg ==
=== Snatch ===
Athlete	Record (kg)	Date	Meet	Place	Ref.
World Standard	99	1 November 2018	—	—	
(China) Li Yajun	100	3 November 2018	World Championships	Ashgabat	
(Thailand) Sukanya Srisurat ^{[a]}	~~101~~	3 November 2018	World Championships	Ashgabat	
(China) Zhang Wanqiong ^{[b]}	101	3 November 2018	World Championships	Ashgabat	
(China) Li Yajun	102	3 November 2018	World Championships	Ashgabat	
(Thailand) Sukanya Srisurat ^{[a]}	~~103~~	3 November 2018	World Championships	Ashgabat	
(Thailand) Sukanya Srisurat ^{[a]}	~~105~~	3 November 2018	World Championships	Ashgabat	
(North Korea) Kang Hyon-gyong	103	30 September 2023	Asian Games	Hangzhou	
(North Korea) Kang Hyon-gyong	104	4 February 2024	Asian Championships	Tashkent	

=== Clean & Jerk ===
Athlete	Record (kg)	Date	Meet	Place	Ref.
World Standard	124	1 November 2018	—	—	
(Thailand) Sukanya Srisurat ^{[a]}	~~125~~	3 November 2018	World Championships	Ashgabat	
(Thailand) Sukanya Srisurat ^{[a]}	~~127~~	3 November 2018	World Championships	Ashgabat	
(China) Liao Qiuyun ^{[b]}	125	24 February 2019	World Cup	Fuzhou	
(China) Liao Qiuyun	128	22 April 2019	Asian Championships	Ningbo	
(China) Liao Qiuyun	129	20 September 2019	World Championships	Pattaya	
(North Korea) Kang Hyon-gyong	130	30 September 2023	Asian Games	Hangzhou	
(North Korea) Kang Hyon-gyong	131	2 April 2024	World Cup	Phuket	

=== Total ===
Athlete	Record (kg)	Date	Meet	Place	Ref.
World Standard	221	1 November 2018	—	—	
(China) Li Yajun	223	3 November 2018	World Championships	Ashgabat	
(Thailand) Sukanya Srisurat ^{[a]}	~~227~~	3 November 2018	World Championships	Ashgabat	
(China) Li Yajun ^{[b]}	225	3 November 2018	World Championships	Ashgabat	
(Thailand) Sukanya Srisurat ^{[a]}	~~230~~	3 November 2018	World Championships	Ashgabat	
(Thailand) Sukanya Srisurat ^{[a]}	~~232~~	3 November 2018	World Championships	Ashgabat	
(China) Liao Qiuyun ^{[c]}	227	20 September 2019	World Championships	Pattaya	
(North Korea) Kang Hyon-gyong	228	30 September 2023	Asian Games	Hangzhou	
(North Korea) Kang Hyon-gyong	233	30 September 2023	Asian Games	Hangzhou	
(North Korea) Kang Hyon-gyong	234	2 April 2024	World Cup	Phuket	

== 59 kg ==
=== Snatch ===
Athlete	Record (kg)	Date	Meet	Place	Ref.
World Standard	104	1 November 2018	—	—	
(Chinese Taipei) Kuo Hsing-chun	105	4 November 2018	World Championships	Ashgabat	
(Chinese Taipei) Kuo Hsing-chun	106	23 April 2019	Asian Championships	Ningbo	
(North Korea) Choe Hyo-sim	107	21 September 2019	World Championships	Pattaya	
(Chinese Taipei) Kuo Hsing-chun	110	19 April 2021	Asian Championships	Tashkent	
(North Korea) Kim Il-gyong	111	2 October 2023	Asian Games	Hangzhou	

=== Clean & Jerk ===
Athlete	Record (kg)	Date	Meet	Place	Ref.
World Standard	131	1 November 2018	—	—	
(Chinese Taipei) Kuo Hsing-chun	132	4 November 2018	World Championships	Ashgabat	
(China) Chen Guiming	133	4 November 2018	World Championships	Ashgabat	
(China) Chen Guiming	136	24 February 2019	World Cup	Fuzhou	
(Chinese Taipei) Kuo Hsing-chun	137	23 April 2019	Asian Championships	Ningbo	
(North Korea) Choe Hyo-sim	138	21 September 2019	World Championships	Pattaya	
(Chinese Taipei) Kuo Hsing-chun	140	21 September 2019	World Championships	Pattaya	
(North Korea) Kim Il-gyong	141	9 December 2024	World Championships	Manama	

=== Total ===
Athlete	Record (kg)	Date	Meet	Place	Ref.
World Standard	232	1 November 2018	—	—	
(Chinese Taipei) Kuo Hsing-chun	233	4 November 2018	World Championships	Ashgabat	
(Chinese Taipei) Kuo Hsing-chun	237	4 November 2018	World Championships	Ashgabat	
(Chinese Taipei) Kuo Hsing-chun	240	23 April 2019	Asian Championships	Ningbo	
(Chinese Taipei) Kuo Hsing-chun	243	23 April 2019	Asian Championships	Ningbo	
(North Korea) Choe Hyo-sim	245	21 September 2019	World Championships	Pattaya	
(Chinese Taipei) Kuo Hsing-chun	246	21 September 2019	World Championships	Pattaya	
(Chinese Taipei) Kuo Hsing-chun	247	19 April 2021	Asian Championships	Tashkent	
(China) Luo Shifang	248	3 April 2024	World Cup	Phuket	
(North Korea) Kim Il-gyong	249	9 December 2024	World Championships	Manama	

== 64 kg ==
=== Snatch ===
Athlete	Record (kg)	Date	Meet	Place	Ref.
World Standard	110	1 November 2018	—	—	
(China) Deng Wei	112	5 November 2018	World Championships	Ashgabat	
(China) Deng Wei	113	25 February 2019	World Cup	Fuzhou	
(North Korea) Kim Hyo-sim	114	24 April 2019	Asian Championships	Ningbo	
(China) Deng Wei	115	24 April 2019	Asian Championships	Ningbo	
(China) Deng Wei	116	22 September 2019	World Championships	Pattaya	
(China) Deng Wei	117	11 December 2019	World Cup	Tianjin	

=== Clean & Jerk ===
Athlete	Record (kg)	Date	Meet	Place	Ref.
World Standard	138	1 November 2018	—	—	
(China) Deng Wei	140	5 November 2018	World Championships	Ashgabat	
(China) Deng Wei	141	25 February 2019	World Cup	Fuzhou	
(China) Deng Wei	142	24 April 2019	Asian Championships	Ningbo	
(China) Deng Wei	143	22 September 2019	World Championships	Pattaya	
(China) Deng Wei	145	22 September 2019	World Championships	Pattaya	
(North Korea) Ri Suk	146	10 December 2023	IWF Grand Prix	Doha	
(North Korea) Ri Suk	147	10 December 2024	World Championships	Manama	
(North Korea) Ri Suk	149	10 December 2024	World Championships	Manama	

=== Total ===
Athlete	Record (kg)	Date	Meet	Place	Ref.
World Standard	245	1 November 2018	—	—	
(China) Deng Wei	247	5 November 2018	World Championships	Ashgabat	
(China) Deng Wei	250	5 November 2018	World Championships	Ashgabat	
(China) Deng Wei	252	5 November 2018	World Championships	Ashgabat	
(China) Deng Wei	254	25 February 2019	World Cup	Fuzhou	
(China) Deng Wei	257	24 April 2019	Asian Championships	Ningbo	
(China) Deng Wei	259	22 September 2019	World Championships	Pattaya	
(China) Deng Wei	261	22 September 2019	World Championships	Pattaya	
(North Korea) Ri Suk	262	10 December 2024	World Championships	Manama	
(North Korea) Ri Suk	264	10 December 2024	World Championships	Manama	

== 71 kg ==
=== Snatch ===
Athlete	Record (kg)	Date	Meet	Place	Ref.
World Standard	117	1 November 2018	—	—	
(Romania) Loredana Toma	119	12 December 2022	World Championships	Bogotá	
(China) Liao Guifang	120	9 May 2023	Asian Championships	Jinju	
(Ecuador) Angie Palacios	121	14 June 2023	IWF Grand Prix	Havana	
(China) Yang Qiuxia	122	13 May 2025	Asian Championships	Jiangshan	

=== Clean & Jerk ===
Athlete	Record (kg)	Date	Meet	Place	Ref.
World Standard	147	1 November 2018	—	—	
(China) Zhang Wangli	148	6 November 2018	World Championships	Ashgabat	
(China) Zhang Wangli	152	6 November 2018	World Championships	Ashgabat	
(China) Liao Guifang	153	13 September 2023	World Championships	Riyadh	
(North Korea) Song Kuk-hyang	154	7 February 2024	Asian Championships	Tashkent	
(North Korea) Song Kuk-hyang	155	13 May 2025	Asian Championships	Jiangshan	

=== Total ===
Athlete	Record (kg)	Date	Meet	Place	Ref.
World Standard	261	1 November 2018	—	—	
(China) Zhang Wangli	263	6 November 2018	World Championships	Ashgabat	
(China) Zhang Wangli	267	6 November 2018	World Championships	Ashgabat	
(China) Liao Guifang	268	9 May 2023	Asian Championships	Jinju	
(China) Liao Guifang	269	13 September 2023	World Championships	Riyadh	
(China) Liao Guifang	273	13 September 2023	World Championships	Riyadh	
(North Korea) Song Kuk-hyang	276	13 May 2025	Asian Championships	Jiangshan	

== 76 kg ==
=== Snatch ===
Athlete	Record (kg)	Date	Meet	Place	Ref.
World Standard	122	1 November 2018	—	—	
(North Korea) Rim Jong-sim	123	26 April 2019	Asian Championships	Ningbo	
(North Korea) Rim Jong-sim	124	24 September 2019	World Championships	Pattaya	
(China) Liao Guifang	125	13 May 2025	Asian Championships	Jiangshan	

=== Clean & Jerk ===
Athlete	Record (kg)	Date	Meet	Place	Ref.
World Standard	153	1 November 2018	—	—	
(China) Zhang Wangli	156	26 February 2019	World Cup	Fuzhou	

=== Total ===
Athlete	Record (kg)	Date	Meet	Place	Ref.
World Standard	272	1 November 2018	—	—	
(China) Zhang Wangli	274	26 February 2019	World Cup	Fuzhou	
(North Korea) Rim Jong-sim	275	26 April 2019	Asian Championships	Ningbo	
(North Korea) Rim Jong-sim	278	26 April 2019	Asian Championships	Ningbo	
(China) Liao Guifang	279	13 May 2025	Asian Championships	Jiangshan	

== 81 kg ==
=== Snatch ===
Athlete	Record (kg)	Date	Meet	Place	Ref.
World Standard	127	1 November 2018	—	—	

=== Clean & Jerk ===
Athlete	Record (kg)	Date	Meet	Place	Ref.
World Standard	158	1 November 2018	—	—	
(China) Liang Xiaomei	159	15 September 2023	World Championships	Riyadh	
(China) Liang Xiaomei	161	12 December 2023	IWF Grand Prix	Doha	

=== Total ===
Athlete	Record (kg)	Date	Meet	Place	Ref.
World Standard	283	1 November 2018	—	—	
(China) Liang Xiaomei	284	12 December 2023	IWF Grand Prix	Doha	

== 87 kg ==
=== Snatch ===
Athlete	Record (kg)	Date	Meet	Place	Ref.
World Standard	132	1 November 2018	—	—	

=== Clean & Jerk ===
Athlete	Record (kg)	Date	Meet	Place	Ref.
World Standard	164	1 November 2018	—	—	

=== Total ===
Athlete	Record (kg)	Date	Meet	Place	Ref.
World Standard	294	1 November 2018	—	—	

== +87 kg ==
=== Snatch ===
Athlete	Record (kg)	Date	Meet	Place	Ref.
World Standard	143	1 November 2018	—	—	
(Russia) Tatiana Kashirina	145	10 November 2018	World Championships	Ashgabat	
(Russia) Tatiana Kashirina	146	13 April 2019	European Championships	Batumi	
(China) Li Wenwen	147	28 April 2019	Asian Championships	Ningbo	
(China) Li Wenwen	148	25 April 2021	Asian Championships	Tashkent	
(China) Li Yan	149	15 December 2024	World Championships	Manama	

=== Clean & Jerk ===
Athlete	Record (kg)	Date	Meet	Place	Ref.
World Standard	177	1 November 2018	—	—	
(Russia) Tatiana Kashirina	178	10 November 2018	World Championships	Ashgabat	
(Russia) Tatiana Kashirina	182	10 November 2018	World Championships	Ashgabat	
(China) Meng Suping	184	10 November 2018	World Championships	Ashgabat	
(Russia) Tatiana Kashirina	185	10 November 2018	World Championships	Ashgabat	
(China) Li Wenwen	186	27 September 2019	World Championships	Pattaya	
(China) Li Wenwen	187	25 April 2021	Asian Championships	Tashkent	

=== Total ===
Athlete	Record (kg)	Date	Meet	Place	Ref.
World Standard	320	1 November 2018	—	—	
(Russia) Tatiana Kashirina	323	10 November 2018	World Championships	Ashgabat	
(Russia) Tatiana Kashirina	327	10 November 2018	World Championships	Ashgabat	
(Russia) Tatiana Kashirina	330	10 November 2018	World Championships	Ashgabat	
(Russia) Tatiana Kashirina	331	13 April 2019	European Championships	Batumi	
(China) Li Wenwen	332	27 September 2019	World Championships	Pattaya	
(China) Li Wenwen	335	25 April 2021	Asian Championships	Tashkent	

== Notes ==
- ^{a} Rescinded for anti-doping violations.
- ^{b} Not a world record at the time of the competition, became a world record in February 2020 when IWF disqualified some results of Thai weightlifters from the 2018 World Championships. By that time, however, it had been surpassed.
- ^{c} Not a world record at the time of the competition, became a world record in February 2020 when IWF disqualified some results of Thai weightlifters from the 2018 World Championships.

== See also ==
- World record progression men's weightlifting
- World record progression men's weightlifting (2018–2025)
- World record progression women's weightlifting (1998–2018)
- World record progression men's weightlifting (1998–2018)
