= 2023 World Weightlifting Championships – Women's 49 kg =

The women's 49 kilograms competition at the 2023 World Weightlifting Championships was held on 4 and 5 September 2023.

== Schedule ==
Date	Time	Event
4 September 2023	11:30	Group D
4 September 2023	14:00	Group C
5 September 2023	14:00	Group B
5 September 2023	16:30	Group A

== Medalists ==
Event	Gold		Silver		Bronze	
Snatch	Hou Zhihui (CHN)	95 kg	Jiang Huihua (CHN)	95 kg	Mihaela Cambei (ROU)	90 kg
Clean & Jerk	Jiang Huihua (CHN)	120 kg	Hou Zhihui (CHN)	116 kg	Jourdan Delacruz (USA)	112 kg
Total	Jiang Huihua (CHN)	215 kg	Hou Zhihui (CHN)	211 kg	Jourdan Delacruz (USA)	200 kg

== Records ==
Prior to this competition, the existing world records were as follows.

World Record	Snatch	Hou Zhihui (CHN)	96 kg	Tashkent, Uzbekistan	17 April 2021
World Record	Clean & Jerk	Mirabai Chanu (IND)	119 kg	Tashkent, Uzbekistan	17 April 2021
World Record	Total	Hou Zhihui (CHN)	213 kg	Tashkent, Uzbekistan	17 April 2021

== Results ==
Rank	Athlete	Group	Snatch (kg)				Clean & Jerk (kg)				Total
Rank	Athlete	Group	1	2	3	Rank	1	2	3	Rank	Total
1st place, gold medalist(s)	Jiang Huihua (CHN)	A	89	93	95	2nd place, silver medalist(s)	112	117	120 CWR	1st place, gold medalist(s)	215 CWR
2nd place, silver medalist(s)	Hou Zhihui (CHN)	A	89	93	95	1st place, gold medalist(s)	111	116	~~119~~	2nd place, silver medalist(s)	211
3rd place, bronze medalist(s)	Jourdan Delacruz (USA)	A	~~85~~	85	88	4	~~107~~	108	112	3rd place, bronze medalist(s)	200
4	Surodchana Khambao (THA)	A	85	~~87~~	87	5	107	~~109~~	109	4	196
5	Mihaela Cambei (ROU)	A	90	~~94~~	~~94~~	3rd place, bronze medalist(s)	105	~~108~~	~~108~~	9	195
6	Hayley Reichardt (USA)	A	82	~~85~~	~~85~~	9	107	~~110~~	~~110~~	5	189
7	Rosegie Ramos (PHI)	A	82	84	86	6	100	102	~~104~~	13	188
8	Rira Suzuki (JPN)	A	78	80	~~82~~	13	~~103~~	103	107	6	187
9	Lin Cheng-jing (TPE)	A	80	~~82~~	82	10	101	104	~~106~~	10	186
10	Fang Wan-ling (TPE)	B	70	75	80	12	95	100	105	8	185
11	Giulia Imperio (ITA)	B	80	~~85~~	85	8	98	~~101~~	~~103~~	17	183
12	Yesica Hernández (MEX)	B	78	80	~~82~~	11	99	103	~~106~~	11	183
13	Andrea de la Herrán (MEX)	B	~~82~~	82	85	7	97	~~100~~	~~100~~	18	182
14	Dahiana Ortiz (DOM)	C	~~79~~	79	~~82~~	14	100	~~105~~	~~105~~	14	179
15	Katherin Echandia (VEN)	C	74	77	~~80~~	16	95	100	~~105~~	15	177
16	Chiaki Ajima (JPN)	B	77	~~80~~	~~80~~	17	~~100~~	100	~~107~~	16	177
17	Shin Jae-gyeong (KOR)	B	~~78~~	~~78~~	79	15	~~97~~	~~97~~	97	20	176
18	Fraer Morrow (GBR)	B	77	~~79~~	~~79~~	18	~~97~~	97	~~100~~	19	174
19	Tham Nguyen (IRL)	D	~~74~~	74	76	19	96	~~99~~	~~100~~	21	172
20	María Giménez-Güervos (ESP)	C	~~72~~	72	74	21	~~93~~	~~93~~	93	25	167
21	Amanda Braddock (CAN)	C	70	~~73~~	73	25	86	90	93	24	166
22	Oliwia Drzazga (POL)	C	70	72	~~74~~	27	~~93~~	93	~~97~~	23	165
23	Sira Armengou (ESP)	D	72	~~75~~	~~75~~	26	92	~~95~~	~~95~~	26	164
24	Duygu Alıcı (TUR)	B	71	~~74~~	74	22	90	~~94~~	~~94~~	30	164
25	Siti Nafisatul Hariroh (INA)	D	70	~~73~~	~~74~~	28	90	~~93~~	93	22	163
26	Dika Toua (PNG)	C	69	~~71~~	~~71~~	31	92	~~95~~	~~95~~	27	161
27	Ýulduz Jumabaýewa (TKM)	B	~~70~~	70	~~73~~	30	91	~~94~~	~~95~~	29	161
28	Dinusha Gomes (SRI)	D	70	~~73~~	73	23	83	87	~~90~~	31	160
29	Katherine Landeros (CHI)	C	66	69	~~71~~	32	86	89	91	28	160
30	Ainur Abdykalykova (KAZ)	D	62	65	68	33	78	83	~~86~~	32	151
31	Rebecca Copeland (IRL)	D	63	66	68	34	78	~~81~~	81	35	149
32	Silvana González (GUA)	D	63	~~66~~	~~66~~	35	~~81~~	81	~~85~~	33	144
33	Maha Fajreslam (MAR)	D	62	~~65~~	~~66~~	36	77	~~81~~	81	34	143
34	Nazila Ismayilova (AZE)	D	60	~~64~~	~~64~~	37	75	~~79~~	~~80~~	36	135
35	Monerah Al-Rowitea (KSA)	D	48	~~52~~	52	38	60	~~65~~	67	37	119
—	Lovely Inan (PHI)	A	~~80~~	~~80~~	~~80~~	—	103	106	—	7	—
—	Phạm Đình Thi (VIE)	B	~~79~~	~~79~~	~~79~~	—	97	101	103	12	—
—	Kerlys Montilla (VEN)	C	72	~~75~~	75	20	~~90~~	~~90~~	~~91~~	—	—
—	Cosmina Pană (ROU)	C	68	~~72~~	73	24	~~87~~	~~87~~	~~87~~	—	—
—	Thanyathon Sukcharoen (THA)	C	70	~~75~~	—	29	—	—	—	—	—
—	Beatriz Pirón (DOM)	D	—	—	—	—	—	—	—	—	—
—	Mirabai Chanu (IND)	D	—	—	—	—	—	—	—	—	—
—	Winnifred Ntumi (GHA)	D	Did not start								
