= 2022 World Weightlifting Championships – Women's 49 kg =

The women's 49 kilograms competition at the 2022 World Weightlifting Championships was held on 5 and 6 December 2022.

== Schedule ==
Date	Time	Event
5 December 2022	11:30	Group D
5 December 2022	14:00	Group C
6 December 2022	14:00	Group B
6 December 2022	16:30	Group A

== Medalists ==
Event	Gold		Silver		Bronze	
Snatch	Jiang Huihua (CHN)	93 kg	Mihaela Cambei (ROU)	90 kg	Hou Zhihui (CHN)	89 kg
Clean & Jerk	Jiang Huihua (CHN)	113 kg	Mirabai Chanu (IND)	113 kg	Hayley Reichardt (USA)	110 kg
Total	Jiang Huihua (CHN)	206 kg	Mirabai Chanu (IND)	200 kg	Hou Zhihui (CHN)	198 kg

== Records ==
Prior to this competition, the existing world records were as follows.

World Record	Snatch	Hou Zhihui (CHN)	96 kg	Tashkent, Uzbekistan	17 April 2021
World Record	Clean & Jerk	Mirabai Chanu (IND)	119 kg	Tashkent, Uzbekistan	17 April 2021
World Record	Total	Hou Zhihui (CHN)	213 kg	Tashkent, Uzbekistan	17 April 2021

== Results ==
Rank	Athlete	Group	Snatch (kg)				Clean & Jerk (kg)				Total
Rank	Athlete	Group	1	2	3	Rank	1	2	3	Rank	Total
1st place, gold medalist(s)	Jiang Huihua (CHN)	A	88	91	93	1st place, gold medalist(s)	110	113	~~120~~	1st place, gold medalist(s)	206
2nd place, silver medalist(s)	Mirabai Chanu (IND)	A	84	~~87~~	87	5	~~111~~	111	113	2nd place, silver medalist(s)	200
3rd place, bronze medalist(s)	Hou Zhihui (CHN)	A	86	89	~~92~~	3rd place, bronze medalist(s)	106	109	—	4	198
4	Mihaela Cambei (ROU)	A	86	~~89~~	90	2nd place, silver medalist(s)	104	~~107~~	~~108~~	8	194
5	Hayley Reichardt (USA)	A	81	~~83~~	84	8	104	107	110	3rd place, bronze medalist(s)	194
6	Nina Sterckx (BEL)	A	85	88	89	4	104	~~109~~	~~109~~	7	193
7	Jourdan Delacruz (USA)	A	84	~~86~~	86	6	~~105~~	105	~~109~~	5	191
8	Natasha Rosa Figueiredo (BRA)	A	83	~~86~~	~~86~~	9	104	~~107~~	~~108~~	6	187
9	Yesica Hernández (MEX)	B	78	80	82	10	~~102~~	102	~~106~~	9	184
10	Phạm Đình Thi (VIE)	B	78	80	~~82~~	14	97	100	102	10	182
11	Katherin Echandia (VEN)	A	~~80~~	~~80~~	80	17	102	~~105~~	~~105~~	11	182
12	Giulia Imperio (ITA)	B	~~80~~	~~80~~	80	16	97	101	~~105~~	12	181
13	Lovely Inan (PHI)	B	78	~~81~~	~~81~~	19	100	~~103~~	~~105~~	14	178
14	Andrea de la Herrán (MEX)	B	~~81~~	~~81~~	81	12	95	~~100~~	~~100~~	20	176
15	Windy Cantika Aisah (INA)	B	~~80~~	80	~~84~~	15	~~96~~	96	—	16	176
16	Ibuki Takahashi (JPN)	D	70	74	~~77~~	22	90	95	100	13	174
17	Rosegie Ramos (PHI)	B	~~75~~	~~75~~	75	21	95	~~100~~	—	19	170
18	Shin Jae-gyeong (KOR)	B	75	~~78~~	~~79~~	20	95	~~97~~	~~98~~	21	170
19	Oliwia Drzazga (POL)	C	67	70	72	27	90	92	95	17	167
20	Tham Nguyen (IRL)	C	73	~~75~~	~~75~~	24	~~93~~	93	~~95~~	23	166
21	Kerlys Montilla (VEN)	C	70	~~73~~	73	25	88	~~92~~	93	24	166
22	Huang Yi-chen (TPE)	C	~~70~~	70	~~75~~	31	~~92~~	92	96	15	166
23	María Giménez-Güervos (ESP)	C	~~71~~	~~71~~	71	28	91	~~94~~	94	22	165
24	Dika Toua (PNG)	C	67	70	~~72~~	30	90	93	95	18	165
25	Noorin Gulam (GBR)	C	67	70	72	26	87	~~89~~	~~90~~	25	159
26	Yessica Torrez (BOL)	D	63	~~66~~	66	33	84	86	~~88~~	26	152
27	Mara Strzykala (LUX)	D	64	66	~~68~~	32	83	85	~~87~~	27	151
28	Omayraliz Ortiz (PUR)	D	58	~~63~~	63	34	77	80	~~82~~	28	143
—	Sanikun Tanasan (THA)	A	85	~~87~~	~~88~~	7	~~103~~	~~103~~	~~103~~	—	—
—	Dahiana Ortiz (DOM)	A	78	82	~~85~~	11	~~103~~	~~103~~	~~103~~	—	—
—	Luiza Dias (BRA)	B	80	~~82~~	~~83~~	13	~~100~~	~~100~~	~~100~~	—	—
—	Noura Essam (EGY)	C	73	76	79	18	~~91~~	~~91~~	~~91~~	—	—
—	Hannah Kaminski (CAN)	C	73	~~75~~	~~75~~	23	~~92~~	~~92~~	~~92~~	—	—
—	Rosina Randafiarison (MAD)	C	71	~~75~~	~~75~~	29	~~91~~	~~91~~	~~91~~	—	—
—	Lin Cheng-jing (TPE)	B	~~75~~	~~75~~	~~75~~	—	—	—	—	—	—
—	Rira Suzuki (JPN)	B	—	—	—	—	—	—	—	—	—
—	Atenery Hernández (ESP)	C	~~74~~	~~74~~	~~74~~	—	—	—	—	—	—
