= Weightlifting at the 2024 Summer Olympics – Women's 49 kg =

Women's 49 kg at the Games of the XXXIII Olympiad
- Venue: Paris Expo Porte de Versailles
- Date: 7 August 2024
- Competitors: 12 from 12 nations
- Winning total: 206 kg

Medalists
1st place, gold medalist(s)		Hou Zhihui	China
2nd place, silver medalist(s)		Mihaela Cambei	Romania
3rd place, bronze medalist(s)		Surodchana Khambao	Thailand

The Women's 49 kg weightlifting competitions at the 2024 Summer Olympics in Paris took place on 7 August at the Paris Expo Porte de Versailles.

== Background ==
Lifters from the Tokyo Olympics in 2020 - Medallists Hou Zhihui of China and Saikhom Mirabai Chanu of India - along with other participants, Chinese Taipei's Fang Wan-ling, United States' Jourdan Delacruz, Dominican Republic's Beatriz Pirón and Belgium's Nina Sterckx - returns for this event, along with debutants. Among them are Romania's Mihaela Cambei and Venezuela's Katherin Echandia, who are the medallists of the event at the 2018 Youth Olympics in Buenos Aires. Meanwhile, Rira Suzuki, aged 26, was chosen to replace retired Hiromi Miyake for Japan.

== Records ==
{{{caption}}}
World Record	Snatch	Hou Zhihui (CHN)	97 kg	Phuket, Thailand	1 April 2024
World Record	Clean & Jerk	Ri Song-gum (PRK)	125 kg	Tashkent, Uzbekistan	4 February 2024
World Record	Total	Ri Song-gum (PRK)	221 kg	Phuket, Thailand	1 April 2024
Olympic Record	Snatch	Hou Zhihui (CHN)	94 kg	Tokyo, Japan	24 July 2021
Olympic Record	Clean & Jerk	Hou Zhihui (CHN)	116 kg	Tokyo, Japan	24 July 2021
Olympic Record	Total	Hou Zhihui (CHN)	210 kg	Tokyo, Japan	24 July 2021

The Olympic record for Clean & Jerk was re-established during the competition:

Category	Athlete	New record	Type
Clean & Jerk	Hou Zhihui (CHN)	117 kg	OR

== Results ==
Rank	Athlete	Nation	Snatch (kg)				Clean & Jerk (kg)				Total
Rank	Athlete	Nation	1	2	3	Result	1	2	3	Result	Total
1st place, gold medalist(s)	Hou Zhihui	China	~~89~~	89	~~93~~	89	110	~~117~~	117	117 OR	206
2nd place, silver medalist(s)	Mihaela Cambei	Romania	89	91	93	93	106	110	112	112	205
3rd place, bronze medalist(s)	Surodchana Khambao	Thailand	86	~~88~~	88	88	110	112	~~114~~	112	200
4	Saikhom Mirabai Chanu	India	85	~~88~~	88	88	~~111~~	111	~~114~~	111	199
5	Jourdan Delacruz	United States	84	~~87~~	~~88~~	84	105	~~110~~	111	111	195
6	Fang Wan-ling	Chinese Taipei	80	83	86	86	102	~~106~~	107	107	193
7	Beatriz Pirón	Dominican Republic	85	~~88~~	~~88~~	85	102	107	~~110~~	107	192
8	Rira Suzuki	Japan	83	~~85~~	~~85~~	83	108	~~112~~	~~117~~	108	191
9	Katherin Echandia	Venezuela	83	~~86~~	~~86~~	83	105	~~107~~	~~109~~	105	188
10	Rosina Randafiarison	Madagascar	75	80	~~83~~	80	95	~~100~~	100	100	180
11	Nicola Lagatao	Guam	56	59	~~62~~	59	74	77	~~79~~	77	136
—	Nina Sterckx	Belgium	~~86~~	~~86~~	~~86~~	—	—	—	—	—	DNF
