= 2026 World Weightlifting Championships – Women's 49 kg =

Women's 49 kg at the 2026 World Weightlifting Championships
- Venue: Ningbo Olympic Sports Center
- Location: Ningbo, China
- Dates: 27 October
- Competitors: 18 from 15 nations
- Winning total: 211 kg

Medalists
gold medal	Ri Song-gum	North Korea
silver medal	Zhao Jinhong	China
bronze medal	Huang Yi-chen	Chinese Taipei

The women's 49 kilograms competition at the 2026 World Weightlifting Championships was held on 27 October 2026.

== Schedule ==
Date	Time	Event
27 October 2026	11:00	Group B
27 October 2026	19:00	Group A

== Records ==
Prior to this competition, the existing world records were as follows.

World record	Snatch	Ri Song-gum (PRK)	94 kg	Nagoya, Japan	23 September 2026
World record	Clean & Jerk	Ri Song-gum (PRK)	121 kg	Nagoya, Japan	23 September 2026
World record	Total	Ri Song-gum (PRK)	215 kg	Nagoya, Japan	23 September 2026

== Results ==
Rank	Athlete	Group	Snatch (kg)				Clean & Jerk (kg)				Total
Rank	Athlete	Group	1	2	3	Rank	1	2	3	Rank	Total
1st place, gold medalist(s)	Ri Song-gum (PRK)	A	~~90~~	90	92	1st place, gold medalist(s)	115	119	~~122~~	1st place, gold medalist(s)	211
2nd place, silver medalist(s)	Zhao Jinhong (CHN)	A	85	88	91	2nd place, silver medalist(s)	108	116	~~121~~	2nd place, silver medalist(s)	207
3rd place, bronze medalist(s)	Huang Yi-chen (TPE)	A	82	~~85~~	~~85~~	4	102	104	~~106~~	4	186
4	Fang Wan-ling (TPE)	B	68	74	80	5	95	100	105	3rd place, bronze medalist(s)	185
5	Rose Jean Ramos (PHI)	A	81	84	86	3rd place, bronze medalist(s)	95	~~100~~	~~100~~	9	181
6	Elizaveta Zhatkina (RUS)	A	73	76	78	6	93	96	99	6	177
7	Naruemol Vonghajak (THA)	A	73	77	~~81~~	7	100	~~103~~	~~103~~	5	177
8	Emily Rosa Figueiredo (BRA)	B	~~75~~	~~75~~	75	11	93	97	~~100~~	7	172
9	Khemika Kamnoedsri (THA)	A	~~77~~	77	~~83~~	9	95	~~100~~	~~100~~	10	172
10	Cintia Árva (HUN)	B	~~70~~	~~70~~	70	14	93	95	~~98~~	8	165
11	Irene Jane Henry (MAS)	B	74	~~77~~	~~78~~	12	90	~~94~~	~~95~~	11	164
12	Mara Strzykala (LUX)	B	68	~~71~~	71	13	86	~~90~~	90	12	161
13	Macarena García (CHI)	B	68	~~71~~	~~71~~	16	86	~~90~~	~~90~~	13	154
14	Tendry Tsiky Mahay Tia Rakotonoely (MAD)	B	~~60~~	60	65	17	78	82	~~85~~	14	147
15	Fabia Tiavina Andriamitantsoa (MAD)	B	56	~~60~~	~~60~~	18	~~75~~	75	~~79~~	15	131
—	Gamze Altun (TUR)	A	72	~~75~~	76	10	~~98~~	~~98~~	~~100~~	—	—
—	Marta García (ESP)	A	~~77~~	77	~~80~~	8	~~88~~	~~88~~	~~92~~	—	—
—	Sonja Koponen (FIN)	B	67	69	~~71~~	15	~~85~~	~~85~~	~~85~~	—	—
