= Weightlifting at the 2022 Asian Games – Women's 49 kg =

Women's 49 kg at the 2022 Asian Games
- Venue: Xiaoshan Sports Center Gymnasium
- Date: 30 September 2023
- Competitors: 14 from 12 nations

Medalists
gold medal	Ri Song-gum	North Korea
silver medal	Jiang Huihua	China
bronze medal	Thanyathon Sukcharoen	Thailand

The women's 49 kilograms competition at the 2022 Asian Games was held on 30 September 2023 at Xiaoshan Sports Center Gymnasium.

== Schedule ==
All times are China Standard Time (UTC+08:00)

Date	Time	Event
Saturday, 30 September 2023	10:00	Group B
Saturday, 30 September 2023	15:00	Group A

== Records ==
Prior to this competition, the existing world, Asian and Games records were as follows.

World Record	Snatch	Hou Zhihui (CHN)	96 kg	Tashkent, Uzbekistan	17 April 2021
World Record	Clean & Jerk	Jiang Huihua (CHN)	120 kg	Riyadh, Saudi Arabia	5 September 2023
World Record	Total	Jiang Huihua (CHN)	215 kg	Riyadh, Saudi Arabia	5 September 2023
Asian Record	Snatch	Hou Zhihui (CHN)	96 kg	Tashkent, Uzbekistan	17 April 2021
Asian Record	Clean & Jerk	Jiang Huihua (CHN)	120 kg	Riyadh, Saudi Arabia	5 September 2023
Asian Record	Total	Jiang Huihua (CHN)	215 kg	Riyadh, Saudi Arabia	5 September 2023
Games Record	Snatch	Asian Games Standard	89 kg	—	1 November 2018
Games Record	Clean & Jerk	Asian Games Standard	112 kg	—	1 November 2018
Games Record	Total	Asian Games Standard	200 kg	—	1 November 2018

== Results ==
Legend

- NM — No mark

Rank	Athlete	Group	Snatch (kg)				Clean & Jerk (kg)				Total
Rank	Athlete	Group	1	2	3	Result	1	2	3	Result	Total
1st place, gold medalist(s)	Ri Song-gum (PRK)	A	~~90~~	92	~~95~~	92	117	122	124	124	216
2nd place, silver medalist(s)	Jiang Huihua (CHN)	A	88	92	94	94	111	117	119	119	213
3rd place, bronze medalist(s)	Thanyathon Sukcharoen (THA)	A	86	88	90	90	105	107	109	109	199
4	Mirabai Chanu (IND)	A	83	~~86~~	~~86~~	83	108	~~117~~	~~117~~	108	191
5	Rosegie Ramos (PHI)	A	83	85	87	87	100	~~103~~	103	103	190
6	Phạm Đình Thi (VIE)	A	77	80	83	83	97	101	~~104~~	101	184
7	Lin Cheng-jing (TPE)	A	80	~~83~~	~~83~~	80	101	~~105~~	~~105~~	101	181
8	Chiaki Ajima (JPN)	A	~~75~~	75	~~78~~	75	98	~~101~~	~~101~~	98	173
9	Siti Nafisatul Hariroh (INA)	B	69	72	74	74	89	92	~~94~~	92	166
10	Ýulduz Jumabaýewa (TKM)	B	68	~~71~~	~~71~~	68	88	91	~~93~~	91	159
11	Ainur Abdykalykova (KAZ)	B	63	66	68	68	78	81	~~84~~	81	149
12	Batnasangiin Tungalag (MGL)	B	~~62~~	62	65	65	78	81	~~84~~	81	146
—	Sanikun Tanasan (THA)	A	~~85~~	85	~~88~~	85	~~103~~	~~103~~	~~103~~	—	NM
—	Rira Suzuki (JPN)	B	—	—	—	—	—	—	—	—	NM

== New records ==
The following records were established during the competition.

Snatch	90	Thanyathon Sukcharoen (THA)	GR
Snatch	92	Jiang Huihua (CHN)	GR
Snatch	94	Jiang Huihua (CHN)	GR
Clean & Jerk	117	Ri Song-gum (PRK)	GR
Clean & Jerk	119	Jiang Huihua (CHN)	GR
Clean & Jerk	122	Ri Song-gum (PRK)	WR
Clean & Jerk	124	Ri Song-gum (PRK)	WR
Total	205	Jiang Huihua (CHN)	GR
Total	209	Ri Song-gum (PRK)	GR
Total	211	Jiang Huihua (CHN)	GR
Total	213	Jiang Huihua (CHN)	GR
Total	214	Ri Song-gum (PRK)	GR
Total	216	Ri Song-gum (PRK)	WR
