= 2024 World Weightlifting Championships – Women's 49 kg =

Women's 49 kg at the 2024 World Weightlifting Championships
- Venue: Weightlifting Marquee Venue
- Location: Manama, Bahrain
- Dates: 7 December
- Competitors: 10 from 10 nations
- Winning total: 213 kg

Medalists
gold medal	Ri Song-gum	North Korea
silver medal	Xiang Linxiang	China
bronze medal	Rosegie Ramos	Philippines

The women's 49 kilograms competition at the 2024 World Weightlifting Championships was held on 7 December 2024.

== Schedule ==
Date	Time	Event
7 December 2024	17:30	Group A

== Records ==
Prior to this competition, the existing world records were as follows.

World Record	Snatch	Hou Zhihui (CHN)	97 kg	Phuket, Thailand	1 April 2024
World Record	Clean & Jerk	Ri Song-gum (PRK)	125 kg	Tashkent, Uzbekistan	4 February 2024
World Record	Total	Ri Song-gum (PRK)	221 kg	Phuket, Thailand	1 April 2024

== Results ==
Rank	Athlete	Group	Snatch (kg)				Clean & Jerk (kg)				Total
Rank	Athlete	Group	1	2	3	Rank	1	2	3	Rank	Total
1st place, gold medalist(s)	Ri Song-gum (PRK)	A	91	~~95~~	~~98~~	2nd place, silver medalist(s)	119	122	~~126~~	1st place, gold medalist(s)	213
2nd place, silver medalist(s)	Xiang Linxiang (CHN)	A	88	92	~~96~~	1st place, gold medalist(s)	113	117	120; WJR	2nd place, silver medalist(s)	212; WJR
3rd place, bronze medalist(s)	Rosegie Ramos (PHI)	A	83	86	88	3rd place, bronze medalist(s)	100	105	~~108~~	4	193
4	Lin Cheng-jing (TPE)	A	~~83~~	83	~~86~~	4	105	107	~~111~~	3rd place, bronze medalist(s)	190
5	Gyaneshwari Yadav (IND)	A	~~80~~	~~80~~	80	6	99	102	~~105~~	5	182
6	Andrea de la Herrán (MEX)	A	75	80	~~85~~	5	90	93	~~101~~	8	173
7	Sira Armengou (ESP)	A	71	~~74~~	74	7	90	~~93~~	94	6	168
8	Cosmina Adriana Pană (ROU)	A	70	73	~~76~~	8	90	93	~~96~~	7	166
9	Mara Strzykala (LUX)	A	66	69	~~72~~	9	~~86~~	88	~~92~~	9	157
10	Nadezhda Nguen (BUL)	A	45	50	53	10	55	60	63	10	116
