= Weightlifting at the 2022 Commonwealth Games – Women's 49 kg =

Weightlifting – Women's 49 kg at the 2022 Commonwealth Games
- Venue: National Exhibition Centre
- Dates: 30 July 2022
- Competitors: 11 from 11 nations
- Winning total weight: 201

Medalists
gold medal	Saikhom Mirabai Chanu	India
silver medal	Roilya Ranaivosoa	Mauritius
bronze medal	Hannah Kaminski	Canada

The Women's 49 kg weightlifting event at the 2022 Commonwealth Games took place at the National Exhibition Centre on 30 July 2022. The weightlifter from India won the gold, with a combined lift of 201 kg.

== Records ==
Prior to this competition, the existing world, Commonwealth and Games records were as follows:
When the previous records and weight classes were discarded following readjustment, the IWF defined "world standards" as the minimum lifts needed to qualify as world records (WR), CommonWealth Authority defined "Commonwealth standards" and "Commonwealth games standards" as the minimum lifts needed to qualify as Commonwealth record (CR) and Commonwealth games record (GR) in the new weight classes. Wherever World Standard/Commonwealth Standard/Commonwealth Games Standard appear in the list below, no qualified weightlifter has yet lifted the benchmark weights in a sanctioned competition.

World record	Snatch	Hou Zhihui (CHN)	96 kg	Tashkent, Uzbekistan	17 April 2021
World record	Clean & Jerk	Saikhom Mirabai Chanu (IND)	119 kg	Tashkent, Uzbekistan	17 April 2021
World record	Total	Hou Zhihui (CHN)	213 kg	Tashkent, Uzbekistan	17 April 2021
Commonwealth record	Snatch	Saikhom Mirabai Chanu (IND)	87 kg	Pattaya, Thailand	19 September 2019
Commonwealth record	Clean & Jerk	Saikhom Mirabai Chanu (IND)	119 kg	Tashkent, Uzbekistan	17 April 2021
Commonwealth record	Total	Saikhom Mirabai Chanu (IND)	205 kg	Tashkent, Uzbekistan	17 April 2021
Games record	Snatch	Commonwealth Games Standard	77 kg		
Games record	Clean & Jerk	Commonwealth Games Standard	99 kg		
Games record	Total	Commonwealth Games Standard	175 kg		

The following records were established during the competition:

Snatch	88 kg	Saikhom Mirabai Chanu (IND)	CR, GR
Clean & Jerk	113 kg	Saikhom Mirabai Chanu (IND)	GR
Total	201 kg	Saikhom Mirabai Chanu (IND)	GR

== Schedule ==
All times are British Summer Time (UTC+1)

Date	Time	Round
Saturday 30 July 2022	15:30	Final

== Results ==
Rank	Athlete	Body weight (kg)	Snatch (kg)				Clean & Jerk (kg)				Total
Rank	Athlete	Body weight (kg)	1	2	3	Result	1	2	3	Result	Total
1st place, gold medalist(s)	Saikhom Mirabai Chanu (IND)	48.68	84	88	~~90~~	88 CR/GR	109	113	~~115~~	113 GR	201 GR
2nd place, silver medalist(s)	Roilya Ranaivosoa (MRI)	48.63	71	73	76	76	~~92~~	93	96	96	172
3rd place, bronze medalist(s)	Hannah Kaminski (CAN)	48.97	72	74	~~76~~	74	91	94	97	97	171
4	Stella Kingsley (NGR)	48.52	70	73	75	75	91	95	~~98~~	95	170
5	Dika Toua (PNG)	48.90	68	71	74	74	93	96	~~98~~	96	170
6	Noorin Gulam (ENG)	48.77	68	71	73	73	88	~~91~~	~~93~~	88	161
7	Hannah Powell (WAL)	48.60	~~67~~	67	~~70~~	67	~~85~~	~~85~~	85	85	152
8	Srimali Samarakoon (SRI)	48.29	~~65~~	65	~~68~~	65	87	~~90~~	~~90~~	87	152
9	Winnifred Ntumi (GHA)	48.63	60	~~63~~	63	63	73	76	~~79~~	76	139
10	Ying Chan (SGP)	48.40	~~57~~	58	61	61	73	76	~~78~~	76	137
―	Marjia Akter Ekra (BAN)	48.54	58	~~60~~	-	58	~~70~~	-	-	NM	DNF
