= Weightlifting at the 2026 Asian Games – Women's 49 kg =

Women's 49 kg at the 2026 Asian Games
- Venue: Nagoya Trade & Industry Center
- Date: 23 September 2026
- Competitors: 8 from 8 nations

Medalists
gold medal	Ri Song-gum	North Korea
silver medal	Mirabai Chanu	India
bronze medal	Luluk Diana Tri Wijayana	Indonesia

The women's 49 kilograms competition at the 2026 Asian Games was held on 23 September 2026 at the Nagoya Trade & Industry Center.

== Schedule ==
All times are Japan Standard Time (UTC+09:00)

Date	Time	Event
Wednesday, 23 September 2026	10:00	Group B
Wednesday, 23 September 2026	13:30	Group A

== Records ==
Prior to this competition, the existing world, Asian and Games records were as follows.

World Record	Snatch	World Standard	93 kg	—	1 August 2026
World Record	Clean & Jerk	World Standard	120 kg	—	1 August 2026
World Record	Total	World Standard	211 kg	—	1 August 2026
Asian Record	Snatch	Asian Standard	93 kg	—	1 August 2026
Asian Record	Clean & Jerk	Asian Standard	120 kg	—	1 August 2026
Asian Record	Total	Asian Standard	211 kg	—	1 August 2026
Games Record	Snatch	Asian Games Standard	91 kg	—	1 August 2026
Games Record	Clean & Jerk	Asian Games Standard	116 kg	—	1 August 2026
Games Record	Total	Asian Games Standard	207 kg	—	1 August 2026

== Results ==
Rank	Athlete	Group	Snatch (kg)				Clean & Jerk (kg)				Total
Rank	Athlete	Group	1	2	3	Result	1	2	3	Result	Total
1st place, gold medalist(s)	Ri Song-gum (PRK)	A	90	94	—	94	116	121	—	121	215
2nd place, silver medalist(s)	Mirabai Chanu (IND)	A	83	85	87	87	107	111	—	111	198
3rd place, bronze medalist(s)	Luluk Diana Tri Wijayana (INA)	A	83	86	88	88	~~103~~	103	~~107~~	103	191
4	Fang Wan-ling (TPE)	A	82	~~85~~	~~85~~	82	~~100~~	100	~~110~~	100	182
5	Suthasini Kaeosingkhon (THA)	A	~~75~~	75	79	79	93	96	99	99	178
6	Shin Jae-gyeong (KOR)	A	~~76~~	~~76~~	76	76	~~92~~	92	~~95~~	92	168
7	Upamalika Ravihari (SRI)	A	67	70	~~73~~	70	88	91	~~93~~	91	161
8	Mosammat Bristy (BAN)	B	60	63	65	65	76	79	81	81	146

== New records ==
The following records were established during the competition.

Snatch	94	Ri Song-gum (PRK)	WR
Clean & Jerk	121	Ri Song-gum (PRK)	WR
Total	210	Ri Song-gum (PRK)	GR
Total	215	Ri Song-gum (PRK)	WR
