= 2015 World Weightlifting Championships – Women's 48 kg =

The women's 48 kilograms event at the 2015 World Weightlifting Championships was held on 20 and 21 November 2015 in Houston, United States.

== Schedule ==
Date	Time	Event
20 November 2015	15:00	Group C
20 November 2015	19:30	Group B
21 November 2015	17:25	Group A

== Medalists ==
Event	Gold		Silver		Bronze	
Snatch	Jiang Huihua (CHN)	88 kg	Vương Thị Huyền (VIE)	85 kg	Hiromi Miyake (JPN)	85 kg
Clean & Jerk	Ri Song-gum (PRK)	110 kg	Jiang Huihua (CHN)	110 kg	Vương Thị Huyền (VIE)	109 kg
Total	Jiang Huihua (CHN)	198 kg	Vương Thị Huyền (VIE)	194 kg	Hiromi Miyake (JPN)	193 kg

== Records ==
Prior to this competition, the existing world records were as follows.

World record	Snatch	Yang Lian (CHN)	98 kg	Santo Domingo, Dominican	1 October 2006
World record	Clean & Jerk	~~Nurcan Taylan (TUR)~~; Chen Xiexia (CHN)	~~121 kg~~ 120 kg	~~Antalya, Turkey~~; Tai'an, China	~~17 September 2010~~; 21 April 2007
World record	Total	Yang Lian (CHN)	217 kg	Santo Domingo, Dominican	1 October 2006

- Nurcan Taylan's world record was rescinded in 2021.

== Results ==
Rank	Athlete	Group	Body weight	Snatch (kg)				Clean & Jerk (kg)				Total
Rank	Athlete	Group	Body weight	1	2	3	Rank	1	2	3	Rank	Total
1st place, gold medalist(s)	Jiang Huihua (CHN)	A	47.95	~~88~~	88	~~91~~	1st place, gold medalist(s)	106	108	110	2nd place, silver medalist(s)	198
2nd place, silver medalist(s)	Vương Thị Huyền (VIE)	A	47.41	85	~~87~~	~~88~~	2nd place, silver medalist(s)	106	~~109~~	109	3rd place, bronze medalist(s)	194
3rd place, bronze medalist(s)	Hiromi Miyake (JPN)	A	47.73	82	85	~~87~~	3rd place, bronze medalist(s)	105	108	~~109~~	5	193
4	Ri Song-gum (PRK)	A	47.39	77	81	~~83~~	8	107	110	~~111~~	1st place, gold medalist(s)	191
5	Chen Wei-ling (TPE)	A	47.46	80	83	~~86~~	5	100	~~105~~	105	7	188
6	Ryang Chun-hwa (PRK)	A	47.65	80	~~83~~	~~84~~	12	108	~~111~~	~~111~~	4	188
7	Im Jyoung-hwa (KOR)	B	47.87	78	82	85	4	98	~~103~~	103	10	188
8	Sibel Özkan (TUR)	A	47.97	83	~~86~~	~~86~~	6	103	~~109~~	~~109~~	11	186
9	Mirabai Chanu (IND)	B	47.40	~~78~~	78	81	9	98	102	~~104~~	12	183
10	Sri Wahyuni Agustiani (INA)	B	47.91	74	~~78~~	78	18	100	~~103~~	104	9	182
11	Beatriz Pirón (DOM)	A	47.54	~~80~~	80	~~83~~	11	95	98	100	13	180
12	Panida Khamsri (THA)	A	47.68	75	~~80~~	~~80~~	21	102	105	~~109~~	8	180
13	Roilya Ranaivosoa (MRI)	A	47.96	80	~~82~~	~~82~~	14	~~100~~	100	~~104~~	14	180
14	Khumukcham Sanjita Chanu (IND)	B	47.25	78	~~81~~	81	7	~~98~~	98	~~102~~	16	179
15	Anaïs Michel (FRA)	B	47.32	78	~~80~~	~~80~~	16	97	99	~~101~~	15	177
16	Ana Segura (COL)	B	47.97	~~76~~	76	79	15	95	98	~~102~~	17	177
17	Iana Diachenko (UKR)	B	47.57	~~78~~	78	~~80~~	17	~~94~~	94	96	20	174
18	Manon Lorentz (FRA)	B	47.52	~~80~~	80	~~82~~	10	93	~~96~~	~~96~~	25	173
19	Monica Csengeri (ROU)	B	47.88	75	78	80	13	93	~~97~~	~~98~~	27	173
20	Genny Pagliaro (ITA)	B	47.61	~~77~~	77	~~80~~	19	~~93~~	93	~~97~~	26	170
21	Lee Seul-ki (KOR)	B	47.65	75	~~78~~	~~78~~	20	~~95~~	95	~~100~~	21	170
22	Morghan King (USA)	B	47.73	~~75~~	75	~~78~~	23	92	95	~~98~~	23	170
23	Julia Schwarzbach (GER)	B	47.73	73	75	~~77~~	22	92	~~94~~	95	24	170
24	Zhanyl Okoeva (KGZ)	B	47.86	70	~~73~~	73	27	97	~~101~~	~~101~~	18	170
25	Cándida Vásquez (DOM)	C	47.56	~~72~~	~~72~~	72	28	93	~~96~~	96	19	168
26	Estefanía Juan (ESP)	C	47.73	70	73	~~75~~	26	92	95	~~97~~	22	168
27	Kathleen Winters (USA)	C	47.97	73	~~75~~	75	25	~~87~~	87	90	31	165
28	Misaki Oshiro (JPN)	C	47.90	~~75~~	75	~~77~~	24	88	~~91~~	~~91~~	32	163
29	Thelma Toua (PNG)	C	47.91	70	~~74~~	~~74~~	31	85	90	~~93~~	30	160
30	Jenniffer López (ECU)	C	47.99	~~66~~	66	~~69~~	34	85	90	92	28	158
31	Betsi Rivas (VEN)	C	47.73	67	~~70~~	~~70~~	33	87	90	~~93~~	29	157
32	Amanda Braddock (CAN)	C	47.90	~~70~~	~~70~~	70	30	87	~~90~~	~~90~~	33	157
33	Lely Burgos (PUR)	C	47.94	~~68~~	~~68~~	68	32	86	~~89~~	~~89~~	34	154
34	Eva Giganti (ITA)	C	46.95	~~70~~	~~70~~	70	29	80	~~85~~	~~85~~	35	150
35	Tham Nguyen (IRL)	C	47.59	~~54~~	54	57	36	~~72~~	73	~~76~~	36	130
36	Alexandria Craig (IRL)	C	46.77	~~57~~	~~57~~	57	35	71	~~72~~	~~73~~	37	128
—	Nguyễn Thị Thúy (VIE)	A	47.75	~~83~~	~~83~~	~~83~~	—	~~108~~	108	~~110~~	6	—
DQ	Nurcan Taylan (TUR)	A	47.37	~~77~~	77	~~85~~	—	95	~~100~~	~~100~~	—	172
DQ	Silviya Angelova (AZE)	C	47.92	~~67~~	67	~~72~~	—	85	~~90~~	90	—	157
