= Mirabai Chanu =

Indian weightlifter (born 1994)

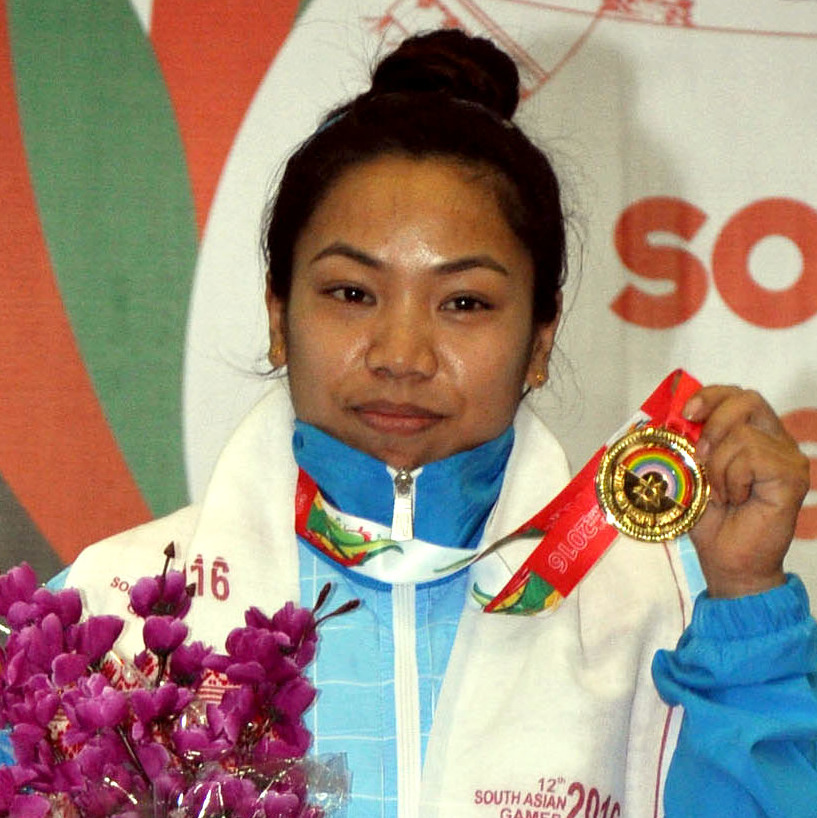
- Mirabai Chanu at the 2016 South Asian Games

Personal information
- Full name: Mirabai Chanu Saikhom
- Born: 8 August 1994 (age 32) Nongpok Kakching, Manipur, India
- Height: 1.5 m (4 ft 11 in)
- Police career
- Branch: Manipur Police
- Service years: 2022–present
- Rank: Additional Superintendent of Police
- Awards: Khel Ratna Award; Padma Shri

Sport
- Sport: Weightlifting
- Event: 49 kg
- Coached by: Vijay Sharma; Aaron Horschig

Achievements and titles
- Olympic finals: (silver) 2020 (49 kg)
- World finals: (gold) 2017 (48 kg), (silver) 2022 (49 kg), (silver) 2025 (48 kg)
Medal record
Women's weightlifting
Representing India
Event	1st	2nd	3rd
Olympic Games	0	1	0
World Championships	1	2	0
Asian Games	0	1	0
Asian Championships	0	0	1
Commonwealth Games	3	1	0
Commonwealth Championships	4	1	0
South Asian Games	1	0	0
Total	9	6	1
Olympic Games
Silver medal – second place	2020 Tokyo	49 kg
World Championships
Gold medal – first place	2017 Anaheim	48 kg
Silver medal – second place	2022 Bogotá	49 kg
Silver medal – second place	2025 Førde	48 kg
Asian Games
Silver medal – second place	2026 Aichi–Nagoya	49 kg
Asian Championships
Bronze medal – third place	2020 Tashkent	49 kg
Commonwealth Games
Gold medal – first place	2018 Gold Coast	48 kg
Gold medal – first place	2022 Birmingham	49 kg
Gold medal – first place	2026 Glasgow	48 kg
Silver medal – second place	2014 Glasgow	48 kg
Commonwealth Championships
Gold medal – first place	2013 Penang	48 kg
Gold medal – first place	2017 Gold Coast	48 kg
Gold medal – first place	2019 Apia	49 kg
Gold medal – first place	2025 Ahmedabad	48 kg
Silver medal – second place	2015 Pune	48 kg
South Asian Games
Gold medal – first place	2016 Guwahati	48 kg

Mirabai Chanu Saikhom (born 9 August 1994) is an Indian weightlifter. She won the silver medal at the 2020 Tokyo Olympics in the women's 49 kg event. On 17 April 2021, she set a world record in clean & jerk in the 49 kg category with a lift of 119 kg (262 lb) in the 2020 Asian Weightlifting Championships, a record which she held till 5 September 2023.

Mirabai Chanu won a gold medal in the 2017 World Weightlifting Championships. She has also won two silver medals at the World Weightlifting Championships in 2022 and 2025, and a silver medal at the 2026 Asian Games. She has won three gold medals and a silver medal at the Commonwealth Games. In the 49 kg weight class, she set a new Commonwealth Games record in the snatch, clean & jerk, and overall categories in the 2018 Commonwealth Games, which she bettered in the 2022 and the 2026 Commonwealth Games.

Mirabai Chanu was awarded the Padma Shri, India's fourth highest civilian honour, and Khel Ratna Award, India's highest sporting honour, by the Government of India in 2018. In 2022, she joined the I-League football club NEROCA FC as its brand ambassador.

== Early and personal life ==
Mirabai Chanu Saikhom was born on 8 August 1994 in Nongpok Kakching, Imphal East district, Manipur, to Saikhom Ongbi Tombi Leima and Saikhom Kriti Meitei. She is the youngest of the six siblings. She was named Mirabai as suggested by one of her sisters, who had a friend of the same name. Saikhom is a clan name commonly used by the Meitei people and Chanu is a name suffix used by unmarried girls of the community. Mirabai has identified herself as a follower of Sanamahism.

At the age of 12, Mirabai Chanu was able to carry a bundle of firewood which her elder brothers had found it hard. She soon started formal training at the Sports Academy at Khuman Lampak Main Stadium complex in Imphal. During her early days, she often hitched rides with truck drivers carrying sand to travel from her hometown to Imphal.

== Career ==
=== Early career (2013–2016) ===
Mirabai Chanu won her first major medal at the 2013 Commonwealth Weightlifting Championships held in Batu Uban in November 2013. She won the gold medal in the 48 kg weight category with a combined lift of 166 kg (366 lb). In the 2014 Commonwealth Games at Glasgow, she won a silver medal in the 48 kg category. She lifted a total of 170 kg (370 lb), and finished behind compatriot Khumukcham Sanjita, who won the gold medal with a lift of 173 kg (381 lb). She qualified for the 2016 Summer Olympics in the women's 48 kg category. However, she was not classified in the final results, as she did not have a legal lift in any of her three attempts in clean & jerk.

=== World Championship and Commonwealth Games wins (2017–2020) ===
On 30 November 2017, Mirabai Chanu won the gold medal in the women's 48 kg category in the 2017 World Weightlifting Championships held at Anaheim, California. She set a new competition record with a total lift of 194 kg (428 lb), including 85 kg (187 lb) in snatch and 109 kg (240 lb) in clean & jerk. In the 2018 Commonwealth Games at Gold Coast, Australia, she won a gold medal in the women's 48 kg category. She lifted a total of 196 kg (432 lb) with 86 kg (190 lb) in snatch and 110 kg (240 lb) in clean & jerk while she set Commonwealth Games records and personal bests in all the three. She took part in the 2019 Asian Weightlifting Championships at Ningbo, but did not win a medal.

At the 2019 World Weightlifting Championships in Pattaya, Mirabai Chanu lifted a total of 201 kg (443 lb) with 87 kg (192 lb) in snatch and 114 kg (251 lb) in clean & jerk to finish fourth. In the 2020 Senior National Weightlifting Championships, she set a new personal best and a national record in the 49 kg category when she lifted 203 kg (448 lb) including 88 kg (194 lb) in snatch and 115 kg (254 lb) in clean & jerk. In April 2021, she won a bronze medal at the 2020 Asian Weightlifting Championships in Tashkent after she lifted 86 kg (190 lb) in snatch and 119 kg (262 lb) in the clean & jerk for a total of 205 kg (452 lb). She set a new clean & jerk world record for the women's 49 kg category with her 119 kg (262 lb) lift, a record which was later broken by Jiang Huihua on 5 September 2023.

=== Olympic medal and subsequent success (2021–2023) ===
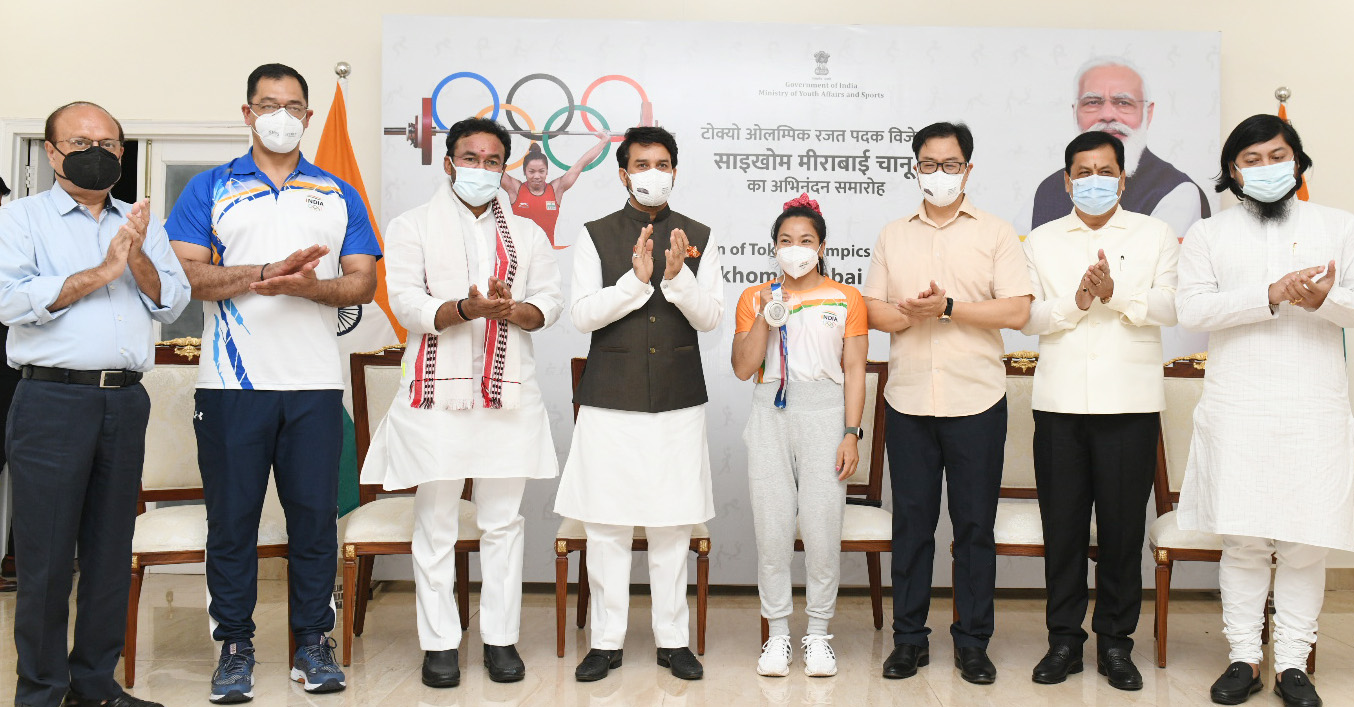
Chanu (center right) being felicitated by the Government of India for her achievement in the 2020 Summer Olympics

In June 2021, Mirabai Chanu became the first Indian woman weightlifter to qualify for the 2020 Summer Olympics after she securing a quota based on the International Weightlifting Federation rankings. Competing in the women's 49 kg category at the Olympics in Tokyo, she lifted 87 kg (192 lb) in snatch and failed in an attempt to lift 92 kg (203 lb). She lifted 115 kg (254 lb) in clean & jerk in her second attempt and failed to clear 117 kg (258 lb) in her last attempt. She won the silver medal with a total lift of 202 kg (445 lb), while Hou Zhihui won the gold with a 210 kg (460 lb) lift. Thus, she won India's first ever Olympic medal in weightlifting, and she became the second Indian weightlifter, after Karnam Malleswari, to win an Olympic medal. She also became only the second Indian woman to win an Olympic silver medal after P. V. Sindhu in 2016.

In the 2022 Commonwealth Games held at Birmingham, Mirabai Chanu won a second consecutive Commonwealth Games gold medal in women's 49 kg category. She lifted a total of 201 kg (443 lb) with 88 kg (194 lb) in snatch and 113 kg (249 lb) in clean & jerk, while breaking her own records in all the three which were set at the previous edition in 2018. She finished in fourth in the women's 49kg weightlifting event at the 2022 Asian Games with a total lift of 191 kg (421 lb) with 83 kg (183 lb) in snatch and 108 kg (238 lb) in clean & jerk. During her final attempt at 117 kg (258 lb) in clean & jerk, she suffered a thigh injury and was unable to complete the lift. In December 2022, she won a silver medal in the women's 49 kg category in the 2022 World Weightlifting Championships held at Bogotá with a total lift of 200 kg (440 lb).

=== Later years (2024-present) ===
Mirabai Chanu's silver medal win in the 2022 World Weightlifting Championships enabled her to qualify for her third straight Summer Olympics. She was the only Indian weightlifter to qualify for the 2024 Summer Olympics. She competed in the women's 49 kg weightlifting event at the 2024 Summer Olympics in Paris. She lifted 88 kg (194 lb) in snatch and 111 kg (245 lb) in clean & jerk, which was way below her personal best of 119 kg (262 lb). With a total of 199 kg (439 lb), she narrowly missed out on a bronze medal, which was won by Thailand's Surodchana Khambao with a 200 kg (440 lb) total.

In October 2025, Mirabai Chanu won her second silver medal in the World Weightlifting Championships. She finished second in the 48 kg category with a total lift of 199 kg (439 lb). In February 2026, during the Senior National Weightlifting Championships, she set three new national records with a 89 kg (196 lb) lift in snatch and 116 kg (256 lb) lift in clean & jerk, for a total of 205 kg (452 lb). In the 2026 Commonwealth Games held at Glasgow, she won a third consecutive Commonwealth Games gold medal in women's 48 kg category. She lifted a total of 190 kg (420 lb) with 85 kg (187 lb) in snatch and 105 kg (231 lb) in clean & jerk, while setting three new Commonwealth Games records.

In the 2026 Asian Games held at Aichi, Mirabai Chanu won her first ever Asian Games medal with a silver in the women's 49 kg category. She placed second behind Ri Song-gum of North Korea with a total lift of 198 kg (437 lb) with 87 kg (192 lb) in snatch and 111 kg (245 lb) in clean & jerk.

== Key results ==
Year	Venue	Weight	Snatch (kg)				Clean & Jerk (kg)				Total	Rank
Year	Venue	Weight	1	2	3	Rank	1	2	3	Rank	Total	Rank
Summer Olympics
2016	Rio de Janeiro, Brazil	48 kg	~~82~~	82	~~84~~	—N/a	~~103~~	~~106~~	~~106~~	—N/a	DNF	―
2020	Tokyo, Japan	49 kg	84	87	~~89~~	—N/a	110	115	~~117~~	—N/a	202	2nd place, silver medalist(s)
2024	Paris, France	49 kg	85	~~88~~	88	—N/a	~~111~~	111	~~114~~	—N/a	199	4
World Championships
2017	Anaheim, United States	48 kg	83	~~85~~	85	2nd place, silver medalist(s)	103	107	109	1st place, gold medalist(s)	194	1st place, gold medalist(s)
2019	Pattaya, Thailand	49 kg	84	87	~~89~~	5	111	114	~~118~~	4	201	4
2022	Bogotá, Colombia	49 kg	84	~~87~~	87	5	~~111~~	111	113	2nd place, silver medalist(s)	200	2nd place, silver medalist(s)
2025	Førde, Norway	48 kg	84	~~87~~	~~87~~	3rd place, bronze medalist(s)	109	112	115	2nd place, silver medalist(s)	199	2nd place, silver medalist(s)
IWF World Cup
2024	Phuket, Thailand	59 kg	75	79	81	13	98	103	~~106~~	9	184	12
Asian Games
2014	Incheon, South Korea	48 kg	70	73	75	—N/a	90	93	96	—N/a	171	9
2023	Hangzhou, China	49 kg	83	~~86~~	~~86~~	—N/a	108	~~117~~	~~117~~	—N/a	191	4
2026	Aichi-Nagoya, Japan	49 kg	83	85	87	—N/a	107	111	—N/a	—N/a	198	2nd place, silver medalist(s)
Asian Championships
2016	Tashkent, Uzbekistan	48 kg	81	81	~~84~~	7	102	106	~~108~~	6	190	7
2019	Ningbo, China	49 kg	83	~~86~~	86	4	109	113	~~115~~	3rd place, bronze medalist(s)	199	4
2021	Tashkent, Uzbekistan	49 kg	~~85~~	~~85~~	86	4	113	117	119 WR	1st place, gold medalist(s)	205	3rd place, bronze medalist(s)
2023	Jinju, South Korea	49 kg	85	~~88~~	~~88~~	5	109	—	—	6	194	6
Commonwealth Games
2014	Glasgow, United Kingdom	48 kg	72	~~75~~	75	—N/a	92	95	~~98~~	—N/a	170	2nd place, silver medalist(s)
2018	Gold Coast, Australia	48 kg	80	84	86 CR GR	—N/a	103	107	110 CR GR	—N/a	196 CR GR	1st place, gold medalist(s)
2022	Birmingham, United Kingdom	49 kg	84	88 CR GR	~~90~~	—N/a	109	113 GR	~~120~~	—N/a	201 GR	1st place, gold medalist(s)
2026	Glasgow, United Kingdom	48 kg	~~82~~	82	85 CR GR	—N/a	~~105~~	105 GR	—N/a	—N/a	190 GR	1st place, gold medalist(s)

== Awards and honours ==
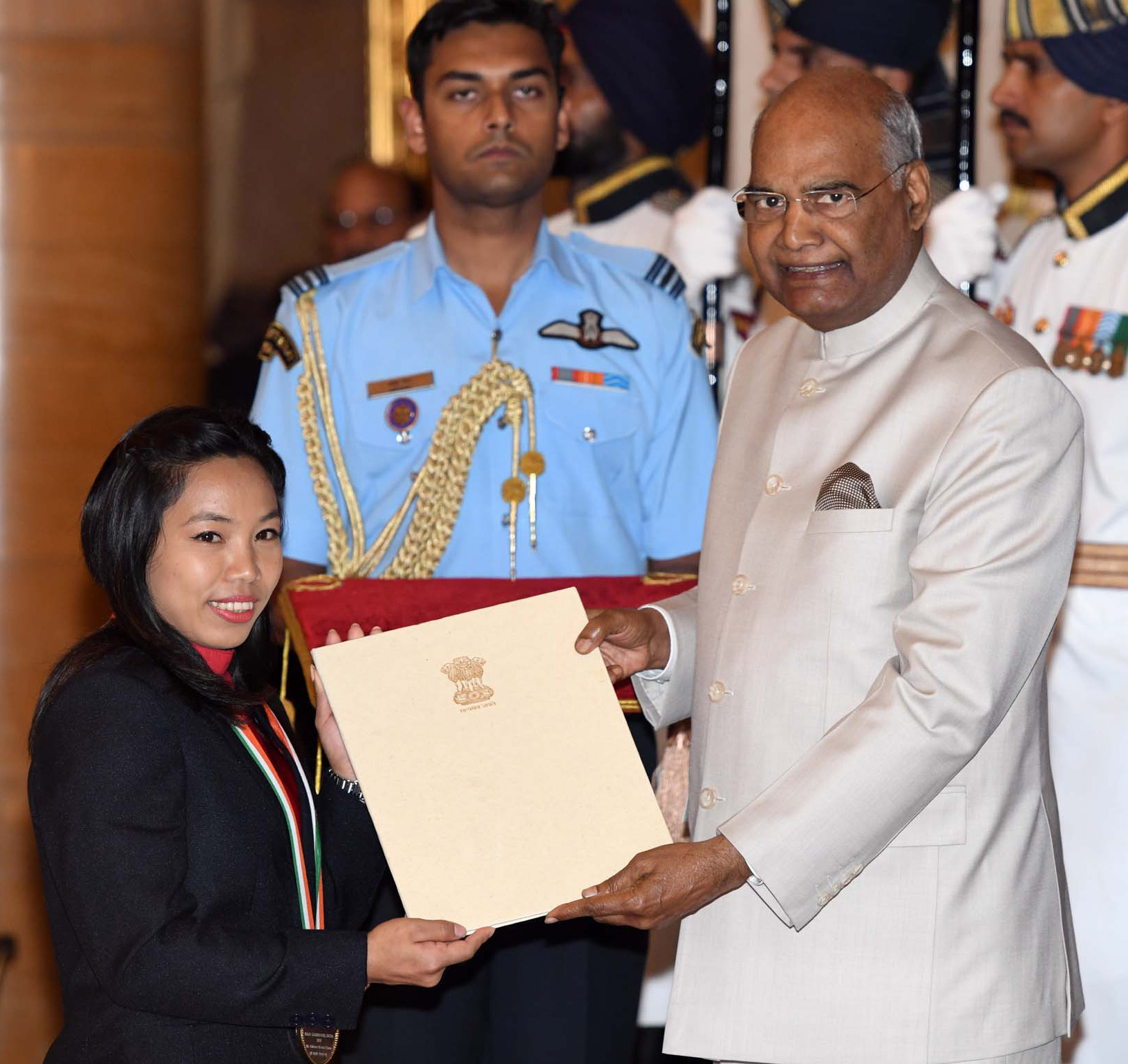
Chanu receiving the Khel Ratna Award from President Ram Nath Kovind in 2018

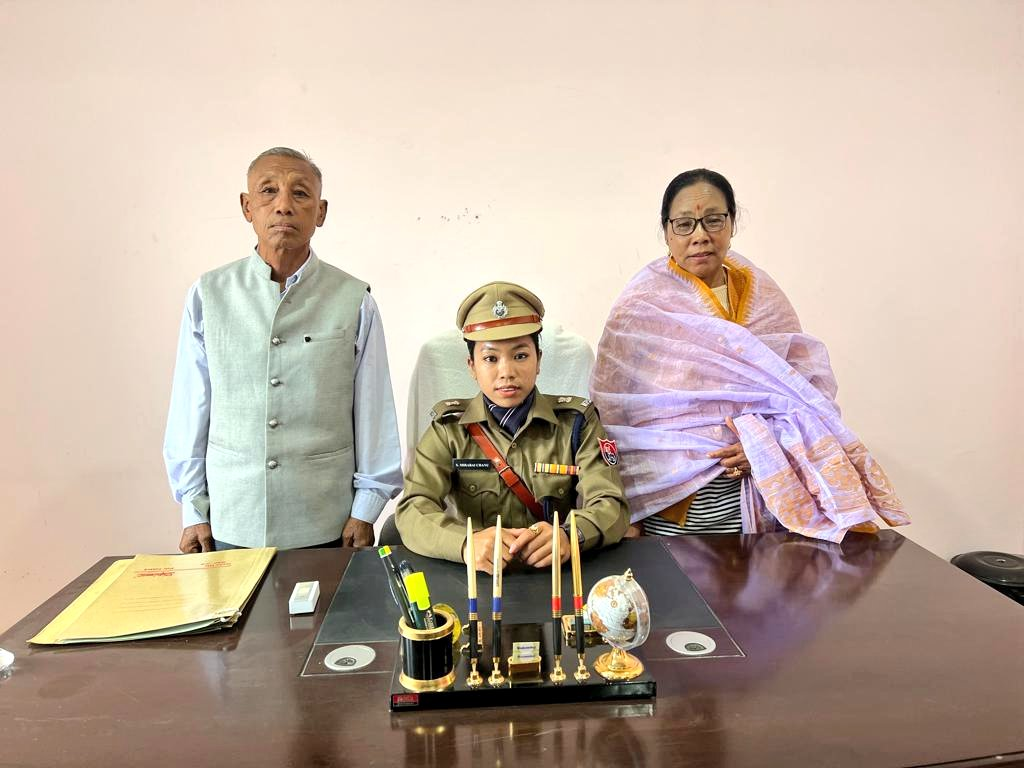
Chanu (center) being inducted as an Additional Superintendent of Police in the Manipur Police on 15 January 2022

On 15 January 2022, Mirabai Chanu was given an honorary appointment as an Additional Superintendent of Police in the Manipur Police in recognition of her achievements in sports.

=== Individual honours ===
- Padma Shri (2018), India's fourth highest civilian honour
- Khel Ratna Award (2018), India's highest sporting honour
- Weightlifter of the Year (2021) by The Times of India

=== Others ===
The Government of Manipur awarded ₹2 million (US$21,000) to Mirabai Chanu after she won a gold medal in the 2017 World Weightlifting Championships. It awarded ₹1 million (US$10,000) after she qualified for the 2020 Summer Olympics, and a further ₹2.5 million (US$26,000) for her participation in the Olympics. After she won a silver medal at the 2020 Tokyo Summer Olympics, the Ministry of Railways announced a cash reward of ₹20 million (US$210,000) and a promotion in her job in the Indian Railways. She was awarded ₹10 million (US$100,000) from the Government of Manipur, ₹5 million (US$52,000) from the Government of India, and ₹4 million (US$42,000) from the Indian Olympic Association. She also received ₹10 million (US$100,000) from BYJU'S, and ₹5 million (US$52,000) from the Board of Control for Cricket in India.

== In popular culture ==
Mei Iklaba Thamoi is a Shumang Kumhei (theater art in Meitei language) based on the life of Mirabai Chanu, directed by Shougrakpam Hemanta, and released on 19 September 2021. In 2021, a Metei language feature film, based on Mirabai Chanu's life, was announced by Seuti Films, and was to be directed by OC Meira.

== See also ==
- India at the 2020 Summer Olympics
