= Rosegie Ramos =

Filipino weightlifter (born 2003)

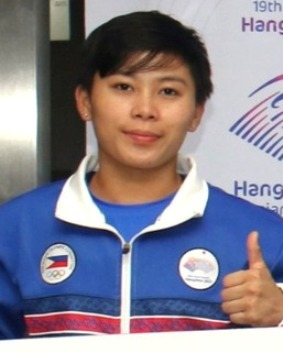
- Ramos in 2023

Personal information
- Nationality: Filipino
- Born: 15 December 2003 (age 22) Zamboanga City, Philippines
- Height: 1.45 m (4 ft 9 in)
- Weight: 48.70 kg (107 lb)

Sport
- Country: Philippines
- Sport: Weightlifting
- Event: 49 kg
- Coached by: Julius Naranjo

Achievements and titles
- Personal bests: Snatch: 87 kg (2023, NR); Clean and jerk: 103 kg (2023); Total: 190 kg (2023, NR)
Medal record
Women's weightlifting
Representing Philippines
World Championships
| Bronze medal – third place | 2024 Manama | –49 kg |
Asian Championships
| Silver medal – second place | 2025 Jiangshan | -49 kg |
| Bronze medal – third place | 2024 Tashkent | -49 kg |
Southeast Asian Games
| Bronze medal – third place | 2021 Vietnam | –49 kg |
Asian Junior Championships
| Gold medal – first place | 2022 Tashkent | –49 kg |
| Gold medal – first place | 2023 Delhi | –49 kg |

Rosegie Amis Ramos (born 15 December 2003) is a Filipino weightlifter, competing in the women's 49 kg category.

== Career ==
Ramos first participated at the 2019 Asian Youth & Junior Weightlifting Championships competing in the women's youth 49 kg category. She placed fourth overall.

She then participated at the 2021 Southeast Asian Games, her first senior competition while still being a youth lifter. She received a bronze medal and achieved three national records in the process. In the same year, she participated at the 2022 Asian Youth & Junior Weightlifting Championships. Now competing as a junior, she won the gold medal in the junior women's 49 kg category.

Rosegie Ramos would fail short of qualifying for the 2024 Summer Olympics in Paris due to a tiebreaker with tenth ranking lifter, Beatriz Piron from the Dominican Republic in the IWF Olympic Qualification Ranking.

== Personal life ==
Ramos's family comes from a line of weightlifters. With sister Rose Jean Ramos who is a two-time youth world champion and her cousin Hidilyn Diaz who is an Olympic and world champion are also weightlifters.

== Major results ==
| Year | Venue | Weight | Snatch (kg) | | | | Clean & Jerk (kg) | | | | Total | Rank |
| Year | Venue | Weight | 1 | 2 | 3 | Rank | 1 | 2 | 3 | Rank | Total | Rank |
World Championships
| 2022 | Bogotá, Colombia | 49 kg | ~~75~~ | ~~75~~ | 75 | 21 | 95 | ~~100~~ | —N/a | 19 | 170 | 17 |
| 2023 | Riyadh, Saudi Arabia | 49 kg | 82 | 84 | 86 | 7 | 100 | 102 | ~~104~~ | 13 | 188 | 7 |
| 2024 | Manama, Bahrain | 49 kg | 83 | 86 | 88 | 3rd place, bronze medalist(s) | 100 | 105 | ~~108~~ | 4 | 193 | 3rd place, bronze medalist(s) |
| 2025 | Førde, Norway | 48 kg | 80 | ~~83~~ | ~~83~~ | 6 | 96 | ~~98~~ | ~~98~~ | 15 | 176 | 9 |
Asian Games
| 2023 | Hangzhou, China | 49 kg | 83 | 85 | 87 | 4 | 100 | ~~103~~ | 103 | 5 | 190 | 5 |
Asian Championships
| 2023 | Jinju, South Korea | 49 kg | 82 | 84 | ~~87~~ | 6 | 99 | ~~102~~ | ~~102~~ | 13 | 183 | 9 |
| 2025 | Jiangshan, China | 49 kg | 85 | 88 | 90 | 2nd place, silver medalist(s) | 103 | 107 | ~~110~~ | 2nd place, silver medalist(s) | 197 | 2nd place, silver medalist(s) |
Asian Junior Championships
| 2022 | Tashkent, Uzbekistan | 49 kg | 75 | 78 | 80 | 1st place, gold medalist(s) | 93 | 96 | ~~100~~ | 1st place, gold medalist(s) | 176 | 1st place, gold medalist(s) |
| 2023 | Delhi, India | 49 kg | ~~80~~ | 80 | 83 | 1st place, gold medalist(s) | 96 | 99 | ~~101~~ | 1st place, gold medalist(s) | 182 | 1st place, gold medalist(s) |
