= Mihaela Cambei =

Romanian weightlifter (born 2002)

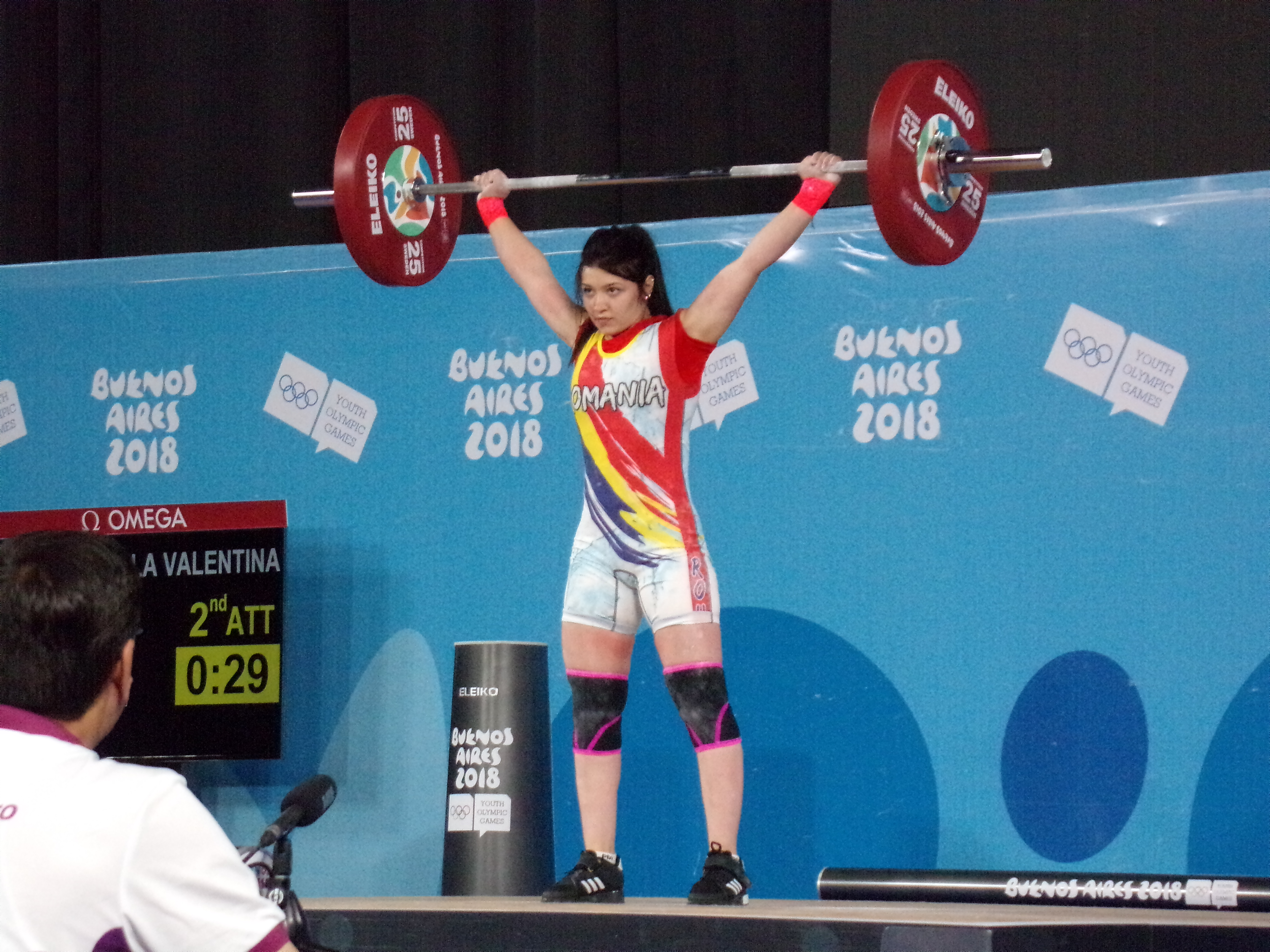
- Cambei at the 2018 Summer Youth Olympics

Personal information
- Full name: Mihaela Valentina Cambei
- Born: 18 November 2002 (age 23) Dofteana, Romania

Sport
- Country: Romania
- Sport: Weightlifting
- Weight class: 53 kg
- Coached by: Valeriu Calancea
Medal record
Women's weightlifting
Representing Romania
Olympic Games
Silver medal – second place	2024 Paris	49 kg
World Championships
Silver medal – second place	2025 Førde	53 kg
European Championships
Gold medal – first place	2023 Yerevan	49 kg
Gold medal – first place	2024 Sofia	49 kg
Gold medal – first place	2025 Chișinău	49 kg
Silver medal – second place	2026 Batumi	53 kg
Bronze medal – third place	2021 Moscow	49 kg
European U23 Championships
Gold medal – first place	2023 Bucharest	49 kg
Gold medal – first place	2025 Durres	53 kg
World Junior Championships
Silver medal – second place	2021 Tashkent	49 kg
European Junior Championships
Gold medal – first place	2022 Durres	49 kg
Silver medal – second place	2019 Bucharest	49 kg
Summer Youth Olympics
Bronze medal – third place	2018 Buenos Aires	48 kg
Youth World Championships
Silver medal – second place	2019 Las Vegas	49 kg
European Youth Championships
Gold medal – first place	2017 Pristina	48 kg
Gold medal – first place	2018 San Donato	48 kg
Gold medal – first place	2019 Eilat	49 kg

Mihaela Cambei (born 18 November 2002) is a Romanian weightlifter. She won the silver medal in the women's 49 kg event at the 2024 Summer Olympics held in Paris, France. In 2023, she won the gold medal in the women's 49 kg event at the European Weightlifting Championships held in Yerevan, Armenia. She also won the gold medal in her event at the 2024 European Weightlifting Championships held in Sofia, Bulgaria.

== Career ==
In 2018, Cambei won the bronze medal in the 48 kg event at the Summer Youth Olympics held in Buenos Aires, Argentina.

At the 2019 European Junior & U23 Weightlifting Championships held in Bucharest, Romania, she won the silver medal in the women's junior 49 kg event in the Snatch, Clean & Jerk and Total. In 2021, Cambei won the bronze medal in the women's 49 kg event at the European Weightlifting Championships held in Moscow, Russia. She also won the silver medal in her event at the Junior World Weightlifting Championships held in Tashkent, Uzbekistan.

Cambei won the gold medal in her event at the 2022 European Junior & U23 Weightlifting Championships held in Durrës, Albania.

Cambei won the silver medal in the women's 49 kg Snatch event at the 2022 World Weightlifting Championships held in Bogotá, Colombia. She won the gold medal in the women's 49 kg event at the 2023 European Weightlifting Championships held in Yerevan, Armenia. She also won the gold medals in the Snatch and Clean & Jerk events. Cambei won the bronze medal in the women's 49 kg Snatch event at the 2023 World Weightlifting Championships held in Riyadh, Saudi Arabia.

In August 2024, Cambei competed in the women's 49 kg event at the 2024 Summer Olympics held in Paris, France. She lifted 93 kg in the Snatch placing first provisionally. She later lifted 112 kg in Clean & Jerk which resulted in the second-place finish behind China's Hou Zhihui who was 1 kg ahead in total.

In 2025, Cambei won the gold medal in the women's 49 kg event at the European Weightlifting Championships held in Chișinău, Moldova. She won gold medals in the Snatch and Clean & Jerk events, lifting a total of 190 kg. At the 2025 World Weightlifting Championships held in Førde, Norway, Cambei competed in the women's 53 kg event and won the silver medal in the total with 208 kg. She also won the gold medal in the Snatch, setting the European record with 94 kg, and the silver medal in the Clean & Jerk events.

== Achievements ==
Year	Venue	Weight	Snatch (kg)				Clean & Jerk (kg)				Total	Rank
Year	Venue	Weight	1	2	3	Rank	1	2	3	Rank	Total	Rank
Olympic Games
2024	Paris, France	49 kg	89	91	93	—N/a	106	110	112	—N/a	205	2nd place, silver medalist(s)
World Championships
2022	Bogotá, Colombia	49 kg	86	~~89~~	90	2nd place, silver medalist(s)	104	~~107~~	~~108~~	8	194	4
2023	Riyadh, Saudi Arabia	49 kg	90	~~94~~	~~94~~	3rd place, bronze medalist(s)	105	~~108~~	~~108~~	9	195	5
2025	Førde, Norway	53 kg	90	~~93~~	94; ER	1st place, gold medalist(s)	108	111	114	2nd place, silver medalist(s)	208; ER	2nd place, silver medalist(s)
IWF World Cup
2024	Phuket, Thailand	55 kg	88	91	~~93~~	2nd place, silver medalist(s)	103	108	110	3rd place, bronze medalist(s)	201	2nd place, silver medalist(s)
European Championships
2021	Moscow, Russia	49 kg	80	~~84~~	~~84~~	4	96	100	~~102~~	2nd place, silver medalist(s)	180	3rd place, bronze medalist(s)
2023	Yerevan, Armenia	49 kg	85	90	92	1st place, gold medalist(s)	100	103	106	1st place, gold medalist(s)	198	1st place, gold medalist(s)
2024	Sofia, Bulgaria	49 kg	85	90	~~93~~	1st place, gold medalist(s)	100	105	109	1st place, gold medalist(s)	199	1st place, gold medalist(s)
2025	Chișinău, Moldova	49 kg	~~85~~	~~85~~	85	1st place, gold medalist(s)	97	100	105	1st place, gold medalist(s)	190	1st place, gold medalist(s)
2026	Batumi, Georgia	53 kg	90	~~93~~	95	1st place, gold medalist(s)	110	114	~~117~~	2nd place, silver medalist(s)	209	2nd place, silver medalist(s)
