= Rira Suzuki =

Japanese weightlifter (born 1998)

Personal information
- Born: 6 September 1998 (age 28) Funabashi, Chiba, Japan
- Home town: Shiroi, Chiba, Japan
- Education: Waseda University, Tokyo, Japan
- Employers: ALSOK, Tokyo, Japan
- Height: 146 cm (4 ft 9 in)
- Weight: 48.5 kg (107 lb)

Sport
- Country: Japan
- Sport: Weightlifting
- Weight class: 49 kg
- Team: ALSOK, Tokyo, Japan
- Coached by: Daichi Nagayama (ALSOK), Mari Taira (National)
Medal record
Women's weightlifting
Representing Japan
World Championships
Silver medal – second place	2021 Tashkent	49 kg
Asian Championships
Silver medal – second place	2024 Tashkent	49 kg

Rira Suzuki (鈴木 梨羅, Suzuki Rira) (born September 6, 1998) is a Japanese weightlifter. She won the silver medal in the women's 49 kg event at the 2021 World Weightlifting Championships held in Tashkent, Uzbekistan.

== Career ==
She competed in the women's 48 kg event at the 2017 Summer Universiade held in Taipei, Taiwan.

She won the clean & jerk bronze medal in the women's 48 kg event at the 2018 Junior World Weightlifting Championships held in Tashkent, Uzbekistan.

In 2024, Suzuki won the silver medal in the women's 49 kg event at the Asian Championships held in Tashkent, Uzbekistan. Later that year she set personal bests in Snatch, Clean & Jerk and total at the IWF World Cup.

In August 2024, Suzuki competed in the women's 49 kg event at the 2024 Summer Olympics held in Paris, France. She made one successful attempt both in Snatch and Clean & Jerk setting 191 kg in total placing eighth in her first Olympic Games.

== Achievements ==
Year	Venue	Weight	Snatch (kg)				Clean & Jerk (kg)				Total	Rank
Year	Venue	Weight	1	2	3	Rank	1	2	3	Rank	Total	Rank
Summer Olympics
2024	Paris, France	49 kg	83	~~85~~	~~85~~	—N/a	108	~~112~~	~~117~~	—N/a	191	8
World Championships
2021	Tashkent, Uzbekistan	49 kg	78	~~81~~	~~81~~	2nd place, silver medalist(s)	~~101~~	101	~~104~~	3rd place, bronze medalist(s)	179	2nd place, silver medalist(s)
2022	Bogotá, Colombia	49 kg	—	—	—	—	—	—	—	—	—	—
2023	Riyadh, Saudi Arabia	49 kg	78	80	~~82~~	13	~~103~~	103	107	6	187	8
2025	Førde, Norway	48 kg	~~82~~	~~82~~	~~82~~	—	104	~~107~~	~~110~~	6	—	—
IWF World Cup
2024	Phuket, Thailand	49 kg	83	85	~~87~~	8	107	110	112	4	197	4
Asian Games
2023	Hangzhou, China	49 kg	—	—	—	—N/a	—	—	—	—N/a	—	—
Asian Championships
2023	Jinju, South Korea	49 kg	~~81~~	81	83	7	104	108	111	2nd place, silver medalist(s)	194	5
2024	Tashkent, Uzbekistan	49 kg	82	~~84~~	~~84~~	5	105	109	—	2nd place, silver medalist(s)	191	2nd place, silver medalist(s)
