= 2019 World Weightlifting Championships – Women's 49 kg =

The women's 49 kg competition at the 2019 World Weightlifting Championships was held on 18 and 19 September 2019.

== Schedule ==
Date	Time	Event
18 September 2019	09:30	Group C
19 September 2019	12:00	Group B
19 September 2019	17:55	Group A

== Medalists ==
Event	Gold		Silver		Bronze	
Snatch	Hou Zhihui (CHN)	94 kg	Jiang Huihua (CHN)	94 kg	Ri Song-gum (PRK)	89 kg
Clean & Jerk	Jiang Huihua (CHN)	118 kg	Hou Zhihui (CHN)	117 kg	Ri Song-gum (PRK)	115 kg
Total	Jiang Huihua (CHN)	212 kg	Hou Zhihui (CHN)	211 kg	Ri Song-gum (PRK)	204 kg

== Records ==
Prior to this competition, the existing world records were as follows.

World record	Snatch	Hou Zhihui (CHN)	95 kg	Tokyo, Japan	6 July 2019
World record	Clean & Jerk	~~Chayuttra Pramongkhol (THA)~~; Hou Zhihui (CHN)	~~120 kg~~ 116 kg	~~Ashgabat, Turkmenistan~~; Fuzhou, China	~~3 November 2018~~; 23 February 2019
World record	Total	Hou Zhihui (CHN)	210 kg	Fuzhou, China	23 February 2019

- Chayuttra Pramongkhol's world record was rescinded in February 2020.

== Results ==
Rank	Athlete	Group	Snatch (kg)				Clean & Jerk (kg)				Total
Rank	Athlete	Group	1	2	3	Rank	1	2	3	Rank	Total
1st place, gold medalist(s)	Jiang Huihua (CHN)	A	89	92	94	2nd place, silver medalist(s)	112	~~117~~	118	1st place, gold medalist(s)	212
2nd place, silver medalist(s)	Hou Zhihui (CHN)	A	89	94	~~97~~	1st place, gold medalist(s)	110	~~116~~	117	2nd place, silver medalist(s)	211
3rd place, bronze medalist(s)	Ri Song-gum (PRK)	A	~~89~~	89	~~92~~	3rd place, bronze medalist(s)	~~115~~	115	~~118~~	3rd place, bronze medalist(s)	204
4	Mirabai Chanu (IND)	A	84	87	~~89~~	5	110	114	~~118~~	4	201
5	Ana Segura (COL)	A	80	83	~~85~~	8	101	105	~~107~~	5	188
6	Kristina Sobol (RUS)	A	83	86	88	4	95	~~99~~	99	12	187
7	Beatriz Pirón (DOM)	A	83	86	~~88~~	6	101	~~103~~	~~103~~	9	187
8	Morghan King (USA)	B	80	~~82~~	82	9	99	101	~~103~~	7	183
9	Windy Cantika Aisah (INA)	A	~~78~~	78	82	10	97	100	~~103~~	11	182
10	Anaïs Michel (FRA)	B	77	79	~~81~~	12	98	~~100~~	101	8	180
11	Dika Toua (PNG)	B	74	78	~~80~~	17	95	100	102	6	180
12	Natasha Figueiredo (BRA)	B	75	80	83	7	95	~~98~~	~~98~~	18	178
13	Alyssa Ritchey (USA)	A	78	~~81~~	~~81~~	19	100	~~103~~	~~103~~	10	178
14	Katherin Echandía (VEN)	C	75	78	~~80~~	15	95	98	~~100~~	13	176
15	Lin Cheng-jing (TPE)	B	75	~~78~~	78	18	95	98	~~101~~	15	176
16	Manon Lorentz (FRA)	B	77	~~79~~	79	13	93	96	~~98~~	17	175
17	Amanda Braddock (CAN)	C	75	78	~~81~~	14	92	~~96~~	96	16	174
18	Luana Madeira (BRA)	B	76	79	81	11	93	~~96~~	~~96~~	21	174
19	Angélica Campoverde (ECU)	C	73	76	78	16	94	~~97~~	~~97~~	19	172
20	Roilya Ranaivosoa (MRI)	C	73	~~76~~	~~77~~	26	92	95	98	14	171
21	Elien Perez (PHI)	C	70	73	75	22	90	~~93~~	~~93~~	23	165
22	Nigora Abdullaeva (UZB)	C	72	75	~~79~~	21	90	~~93~~	~~93~~	24	165
23	Elena Andrieș (ROU)	C	70	74	~~76~~	24	~~90~~	90	~~93~~	25	164
24	Patseang Yi-pang (TPE)	C	70	~~74~~	74	25	~~90~~	90	~~94~~	26	164
25	Fiorella Cueva (PER)	C	67	70	~~72~~	29	90	~~93~~	93	20	163
26	Lely Burgos (PUR)	C	65	~~70~~	71	28	~~88~~	88	91	22	162
27	Dinusha Gomes (SRI)	C	70	72	~~74~~	27	85	~~89~~	~~89~~	28	157
28	Kelly-Jo Robson (GBR)	C	67	69	~~71~~	31	84	~~87~~	87	27	156
29	Noorin Gulam (GBR)	C	~~66~~	66	~~69~~	32	84	~~87~~	~~87~~	29	150
—	Ibuki Takahashi (JPN)	B	~~73~~	74	76	20	~~95~~	~~97~~	~~100~~	—	—
—	Hiromi Miyake (JPN)	B	73	75	—	23	~~96~~	—	—	—	—
—	Giorgia Russo (ITA)	B	~~70~~	~~70~~	70	30	~~95~~	~~95~~	~~95~~	—	—
—	Ýulduz Jumabaýewa (TKM)	A	~~78~~	~~78~~	~~78~~	—	—	—	—	—	—

== New records ==
Clean & Jerk	117 kg	Hou Zhihui (CHN)	WR*
Clean & Jerk	118 kg	Jiang Huihua (CHN)	WR*
Total	211 kg	Hou Zhihui (CHN)	WR
Total	212 kg	Jiang Huihua (CHN)	WR

* Not a world record at the time of the competition
