= Weightlifting at the 2018 Asian Games – Women's 48 kg =

Women's 48 kg at the 2018 Asian Games
- Venue: Jakarta International Expo
- Date: 20 August 2018
- Competitors: 12 from 9 nations

Medalists
gold medal	Ri Song-gum	North Korea
silver medal	Sri Wahyuni Agustiani	Indonesia
bronze medal	Thunya Sukcharoen	Thailand

The women's 48 kilograms event at the 2018 Asian Games took place on 20 August 2018 at the Jakarta International Expo Hall A.

== Schedule ==
All times are Western Indonesia Time (UTC+07:00)

Date	Time	Event
Monday, 20 August 2018	14:00	Group A

== Records ==
Prior to this competition, the existing world, Asian and Games records were as follows.

World Record	Snatch	Yang Lian (CHN)	98 kg	Santo Domingo, Dominican Rep.	1 October 2006
World Record	Clean & Jerk	~~Nurcan Taylan (TUR)~~; Chen Xiexia (CHN)	~~121 kg~~ 120 kg	~~Antalya, Turkey~~; Tai'an, China	~~17 September 2010~~; 21 April 2007
World Record	Total	Yang Lian (CHN)	217 kg	Santo Domingo, Dominican Rep.	1 October 2006
Asian Record	Snatch	Yang Lian (CHN)	98 kg	Santo Domingo, Dominican Rep.	1 October 2006
Asian Record	Clean & Jerk	Chen Xiexia (CHN)	120 kg	Tai'an, China	21 April 2007
Asian Record	Total	Yang Lian (CHN)	217 kg	Santo Domingo, Dominican Rep.	1 October 2006
Games Record	Snatch	Wang Mingjuan (CHN)	95 kg	Guangzhou, China	13 November 2010
Games Record	Clean & Jerk	Wang Mingjuan (CHN)	116 kg	Doha, Qatar	2 December 2006
Games Record	Total	Wang Mingjuan (CHN)	210 kg	Guangzhou, China	13 November 2010

- Nurcan Taylan's world record was rescinded in 2021.

== Results ==
Legend

- NM — No mark

Rank	Athlete	Group	Snatch (kg)				Clean & Jerk (kg)				Total
Rank	Athlete	Group	1	2	3	Result	1	2	3	Result	Total
1st place, gold medalist(s)	Ri Song-gum (PRK)	A	85	87	~~90~~	87	112	~~117~~	~~117~~	112	199
2nd place, silver medalist(s)	Sri Wahyuni Agustiani (INA)	A	85	~~88~~	88	88	107	~~112~~	~~112~~	107	195
3rd place, bronze medalist(s)	Thunya Sukcharoen (THA)	A	82	85	87	87	~~102~~	102	~~109~~	102	189
4	Vương Thị Huyền (VIE)	A	80	~~82~~	~~82~~	80	97	~~100~~	101	101	181
5	Nguyễn Thị Thúy (VIE)	A	75	~~77~~	~~77~~	75	98	~~102~~	102	102	177
6	Fang Wan-ling (TPE)	A	~~77~~	77	80	80	96	~~99~~	~~99~~	96	176
7	Ibuki Takahashi (JPN)	A	~~71~~	71	73	73	95	99	~~102~~	99	172
8	Zhanyl Okoeva (KGZ)	A	68	~~72~~	72	72	95	~~101~~	~~101~~	95	167
9	Mizuki Yanagida (JPN)	A	70	~~73~~	~~73~~	70	90	93	~~95~~	93	163
10	Yolanda Putri (INA)	A	~~72~~	~~72~~	72	72	~~90~~	90	~~95~~	90	162
11	Elien Perez (PHI)	A	65	69	~~71~~	69	80	~~85~~	85	85	154
—	Dinusha Gomes (SRI)	A	~~67~~	~~67~~	~~67~~	—	—	—	—	—	NM
