= Saikhom =

Saikhom is a Meitei surname. Notable people with the surname include:

- Kamala Saikhom (born 1987), Indian actress
- Mirabai Chanu Saikhom (born 1994), Indian weightlifter
