= 2025 World Weightlifting Championships – Women's 48 kg =

Women's 48 kg at the 2025 World Weightlifting Championships
- Venue: Førdehuset
- Location: Førde, Norway
- Dates: 2 October
- Competitors: 31 from 26 nations
- Winning total: 213 kg

Medalists
gold medal	Ri Song-gum	North Korea
silver medal	Mirabai Chanu	India
bronze medal	Thanyathon Sukcharoen	Thailand

The women's 48 kilograms competition at the 2025 World Weightlifting Championships was held on 2 October 2025.

== Schedule ==
Date	Time	Event
2 October 2025	13:30	Group C
2 October 2025	16:00	Group B
2 October 2025	19:30	Group A

== Records ==
Prior to this competition, the existing world records were as follows.

World record	Snatch	World Standard	93 kg	—	1 June 2025
World record	Clean & Jerk	World Standard	119 kg	—	1 June 2025
World record	Total	World Standard	210 kg	—	1 June 2025

== Results ==
Rank	Athlete	Group	Snatch (kg)				Clean & Jerk (kg)				Total
Rank	Athlete	Group	1	2	3	Rank	1	2	3	Rank	Total
1st place, gold medalist(s)	Ri Song-gum (PRK)	A	88	~~91~~	91	1st place, gold medalist(s)	115	120	122 CWR	1st place, gold medalist(s)	213 CWR
2nd place, silver medalist(s)	Mirabai Chanu (IND)	A	84	~~87~~	~~87~~	3rd place, bronze medalist(s)	109	112	115	2nd place, silver medalist(s)	199
3rd place, bronze medalist(s)	Thanyathon Sukcharoen (THA)	A	88	~~90~~	~~90~~	2nd place, silver medalist(s)	107	110	~~113~~	4	198
4	Li Shumiao (CHN)	A	~~80~~	80	~~83~~	7	108	111	~~113~~	3rd place, bronze medalist(s)	191
5	Zhu Qiulian (CHN)	A	80	83	~~85~~	5	105	~~111~~	~~111~~	5	188
6	Ludia Montero (CUB)	A	80	83	~~85~~	4	96	100	~~103~~	10	183
7	Fang Wan-ling (TPE)	A	75	78	80	8	95	100	103	8	183
8	Lin Cheng-jing (TPE)	A	~~78~~	~~78~~	78	11	100	103	~~106~~	7	181
9	Rosegie Ramos (PHI)	A	80	~~83~~	~~83~~	6	96	~~98~~	~~98~~	15	176
10	Rebeka Groulx (CAN)	C	74	77	~~80~~	12	90	95	98	12	175
11	Emily Figueiredo (BRA)	B	75	78	~~80~~	9	97	~~100~~	~~100~~	14	175
12	Lee Han-byeol (KOR)	B	75	~~79~~	~~79~~	14	95	98	~~101~~	13	173
13	Lucía González (ESP)	C	72	75	~~78~~	13	91	~~94~~	94	17	169
14	Kim Eun-yeong (KOR)	C	73	~~76~~	~~76~~	17	94	~~98~~	~~101~~	16	167
15	Elizaveta Zhatkina (AIN)	B	70	~~74~~	74	15	90	93	—	18	167
16	Marta García (ESP)	B	76	78	~~80~~	10	~~87~~	87	~~90~~	22	165
17	Jeannis Ramírez (MEX)	B	~~70~~	70	74	16	90	~~94~~	~~94~~	19	164
18	Li Joo (CHI)	B	67	~~71~~	71	18	87	~~91~~	~~91~~	21	158
19	Mara Strzykala (LUX)	C	65	67	~~70~~	21	85	88	~~91~~	20	155
20	Cintia Árva (HUN)	B	66	~~69~~	~~69~~	22	86	~~90~~	~~90~~	24	152
21	Regina Shaidullina (AIN)	B	63	65	~~67~~	23	~~87~~	~~87~~	87	23	152
22	Rebecca Copeland (IRL)	C	65	68	~~70~~	20	80	~~83~~	83	26	151
23	Sonja Koponen (FIN)	C	~~65~~	~~65~~	65	24	~~83~~	83	~~87~~	25	148
24	Janet Oduor (KEN)	C	~~56~~	~~56~~	56	25	~~73~~	73	~~76~~	27	129
25	Sarah Al-Hawal (KUW)	C	40	~~43~~	~~43~~	26	55	~~60~~	60	28	100
—	Dahiana Ortiz (DOM)	A	~~79~~	~~79~~	~~79~~	—	100	~~105~~	~~105~~	9	—
—	Rira Suzuki (JPN)	A	~~82~~	~~82~~	~~82~~	—	104	~~107~~	~~110~~	6	—
—	Gamze Altun (TUR)	B	~~70~~	~~70~~	~~70~~	—	~~98~~	99	~~101~~	11	—
—	Tammy Wong (GBR)	B	~~69~~	~~69~~	69	19	~~86~~	~~86~~	~~86~~	—	—
—	Diana Irizarry (USA)	B	Did not start								
X	Alex Mackay (CWF)	C	59	61	~~63~~	X	79	82	84	X	145
