= Hannah Kaminski =

Canadian weightlifter (born 1994)

Hannah Kaminski (born 13 February 1994) is a Canadian weightlifter who won a bronze medal in the 49 kg weight class at the 2022 Commonwealth Games (Weightlifting at the 2022 Commonwealth Games – Women's 49 kg).

Kaminski first represented Canada at the 2019 Pan American Championships in Guatemala. She is a nursing student and a nutrition, fitness, and weightlifting coach.
