= 2018 World Weightlifting Championships – Women's 49 kg =

The women's 49 kilograms competition at the 2018 World Weightlifting Championships was held on 2–3 November 2018.

Chayuttra Pramongkhol the original gold medalist got stripped of her medal after testing positive for banned substances.

== Schedule ==
Date	Time	Event
2 November 2018	10:00	Group C
2 November 2018	12:00	Group B
3 November 2018	14:25	Group A

== Medalists ==
Event	Gold		Silver		Bronze	
Snatch	Hou Zhihui (CHN)	93 kg	Jiang Huihua (CHN)	92 kg	Beatriz Pirón (DOM)	84 kg
Clean & Jerk	Hou Zhihui (CHN)	115 kg	Jiang Huihua (CHN)	114 kg	Elena Andrieș (ROU)	105 kg
Total	Hou Zhihui (CHN)	208 kg	Jiang Huihua (CHN)	206 kg	Elena Andrieș (ROU)	188 kg

== Records ==
Prior to this competition, the existing world records were as follows.

World Record	Snatch	World Standard	90 kg	—	1 November 2018
World Record	Clean & Jerk	World Standard	115 kg	—	1 November 2018
World Record	Total	World Standard	203 kg	—	1 November 2018

== Results ==
Rank	Athlete	Group	Snatch (kg)				Clean & Jerk (kg)				Total
Rank	Athlete	Group	1	2	3	Rank	1	2	3	Rank	Total
1st place, gold medalist(s)	Hou Zhihui (CHN)	A	88	~~92~~	93	1st place, gold medalist(s)	108	112	115	1st place, gold medalist(s)	208
2nd place, silver medalist(s)	Jiang Huihua (CHN)	A	87	90	92	2nd place, silver medalist(s)	~~108~~	108	114	2nd place, silver medalist(s)	206
3rd place, bronze medalist(s)	Elena Andrieș (ROU)	A	~~83~~	83	~~85~~	7	100	~~105~~	105	3rd place, bronze medalist(s)	188
4	Beatriz Pirón (DOM)	A	81	~~84~~	84	3rd place, bronze medalist(s)	100	103	~~105~~	5	187
5	Sri Wahyuni Agustiani (INA)	A	82	~~85~~	~~85~~	8	~~104~~	104	~~108~~	4	186
6	Vương Thị Huyền (VIE)	A	83	~~85~~	~~85~~	6	~~100~~	~~100~~	100	9	183
7	Hiromi Miyake (JPN)	A	77	79	~~80~~	10	102	~~105~~	~~105~~	7	181
8	Ana Segura (COL)	B	78	81	83	5	97	~~101~~	~~102~~	12	180
9	Şaziye Erdoğan (TUR)	B	77	79	81	9	97	~~99~~	~~100~~	11	178
10	Alyssa Ritchey (USA)	A	74	77	~~80~~	14	96	99	101	8	178
11	Kristina Sobol (RUS)	B	77	80	83	4	88	91	93	20	176
12	Jhilli Dalabehera (IND)	C	73	76	~~78~~	15	92	96	98	10	174
13	Roilya Ranaivosoa (MRI)	B	~~73~~	73	76	17	94	97	~~101~~	13	173
14	Fang Wan-ling (TPE)	B	72	75	78	12	90	94	~~98~~	15	172
15	Anaïs Michel (FRA)	B	~~76~~	76	78	13	~~94~~	94	~~97~~	16	172
16	Ibuki Takahashi (JPN)	B	73	76	~~78~~	16	~~96~~	96	~~100~~	14	172
17	Andrea de la Herrán (MEX)	B	76	78	~~81~~	11	93	~~96~~	~~96~~	18	171
18	Socorro Villa (MEX)	B	72	~~75~~	75	18	93	~~96~~	~~96~~	17	168
19	Ko Bo-geum (KOR)	C	66	70	73	19	85	90	~~93~~	21	163
20	Yolanda Putri (INA)	B	~~73~~	73	~~76~~	20	~~90~~	~~90~~	90	23	163
21	Giorgia Russo (ITA)	B	67	70	~~72~~	23	~~93~~	93	~~98~~	19	163
22	Lely Burgos (PUR)	C	~~70~~	70	~~73~~	22	~~88~~	88	~~91~~	24	158
23	Augustina Nwaokolo (NGR)	C	~~68~~	68	72	21	85	~~90~~	~~90~~	27	157
24	Maria Pipiliaridou (GRE)	C	67	~~70~~	~~70~~	24	~~87~~	87	90	22	157
25	Kelly-Jo Robson (GBR)	C	65	67	~~69~~	25	~~83~~	83	86	26	153
26	Giulia Imperio (ITA)	C	~~65~~	65	~~68~~	27	78	82	86	25	151
27	Elien Perez (PHI)	C	65	~~70~~	~~70~~	26	80	~~83~~	83	28	148
—	Chuluunbaataryn Nyamzul (MGL)	C	63	~~66~~	~~66~~	28	~~81~~	~~81~~	~~81~~	—	—
—	Ri Song-gum (PRK)	A	~~85~~	~~85~~	~~85~~	—	~~103~~	103	—	6	—
—	Santa Cotes (DOM)	B	~~77~~	~~77~~	~~77~~	—	~~91~~	~~91~~	~~91~~	—	—
—	Luana Madeira (BRA)	B	~~75~~	~~75~~	~~75~~	—	~~92~~	~~92~~	~~92~~	—	—
—	Amanda Braddock (CAN)	C	~~74~~	~~74~~	~~74~~	—	—	—	—	—	—
DQ	Chayuttra Pramongkhol (THA)	A	84	86	89	—	115	120	—	—	—
DQ	Sopita Tanasan (THA)	A	86	89	93	—	102	108	~~109~~	—	—

== New records ==
Snatch	92 kg	Jiang Huihua (CHN)	WR
Snatch	~~93 kg~~ 93 kg	~~Sopita Tanasan (THA)~~; Hou Zhihui (CHN)	~~WR~~; WR
Clean & Jerk	~~120 kg~~	~~Chayuttra Pramongkhol (THA)~~	~~WR~~
Total	205 kg	Hou Zhihui (CHN)	WR
Total	206 kg	Jiang Huihua (CHN)	WR
Total	208 kg	Hou Zhihui (CHN)	WR
Total	~~209 kg~~	~~Chayuttra Pramongkhol (THA)~~	~~WR~~
