= Thanyathon Sukcharoen =

Thai weightlifter (born 1997)

Personal information
- Nationality: Thai
- Born: 21 April 1997 (age 29) Chonburi, Thailand
- Height: 1.50 m (4 ft 11 in)
- Weight: 44.77 kg (99 lb)

Sport
- Country: Thailand
- Sport: Weightlifting
- Event: –45 kg
Medal record
Women's weightlifting
Representing Thailand
World Championships
Gold medal – first place	2021 Tashkent	–45 kg
Gold medal – first place	2022 Bogotá	–45 kg
Bronze medal – third place	2025 Førde	48kg
Asian Championships
Gold medal – first place	2025 Jiangshan	-49 kg
Asian Games
Bronze medal – third place	2018 Jakarta-Palembang	-48 kg
Bronze medal – third place	2022 Hangzhou	-49 kg
SEA Games
Gold medal – first place	2021 Vietnam	-45 kg
Silver medal – second place	2025 Thailand	-48 kg

Thanyathon Sukcharoen formerly known as Thunya Sukcharoen (born 21 April 1997) is a Thai weightlifter. She won the gold medal in the women's 45 kg event at the 2021 World Weightlifting Championships in Tashkent, Uzbekistan and the 2022 World Weightlifting Championships in Bogotá, Colombia.

She participated at the 2018 World Weightlifting Championships, winning a medal. In January 2019 she was issued a two-year doping ban until January 2021 after testing positive for 5a- androstane-3a, 17 bdiol (5aAdiol) and 5b-androstane-3a, 17 b-diol (5bAdiol).

She won the gold medal in the women's 45 kg event at the 2021 World Weightlifting Championships held in Tashkent, Uzbekistan.
