= Elena Andrieș =

Romanian weightlifter (born 1994)

Personal information
- Full name: Elena Ramona Andrieș
- Born: 21 September 1994 (age 31)
- Weight: 48.79 kg (107.6 lb)

Sport
- Country: Romania
- Sport: Weightlifting
- Team: National team
Medal record
Women's weightlifting
Representing Romania
World Championships
Bronze medal – third place	2018 Ashgabat	–49 kg
European Championships
Gold medal – first place	2018 Bucharest	–48 kg
Gold medal – first place	2019 Batumi	–49 kg
Bronze medal – third place	2017 Split	–48 kg

Elena Ramona Andrieș (born 21 September 1994) is a Romanian weightlifter, and two time European Champion competing in the 48 kg category until 2018 and 49 kg starting in 2018 after the International Weightlifting Federation reorganized the categories. representing Romania at international competitions.

== Career ==
=== World Championships ===
She has competed at three world championships, the first being the 2010 World Weightlifting Championships where she competed as a 16 year old.

=== European Championships ===
She also competed at the 2017 European Weightlifting Championships, where she won a bronze medal in the snatch and total. The following year she competed at the 2018 European Weightlifting Championships in the 48 kg category which was held in her home country of Romania. She won gold medals in all three lifts finishing with a total of 179 kg.

In 2019 she competed at the 2019 European Weightlifting Championships, which was the first European Weightlifting Championships after the IWF restructured the weight classes. In the 49 kg category she again swept all three gold medals in the snatch, clean & jerk and total. Her total of 190 kg was a full 29 kg ahead of the silver medalist.

=== Doping Ban ===
In 2013 she tested positive for Stanazolol at the 2013 European Weightlifting Championships and had her performance and medals disqualified. She was banned from competing from 8 April 2013 to 8 April 2015.

== Major results ==
Year	Venue	Weight	Snatch (kg)				Clean & Jerk (kg)				Total	Rank
Year	Venue	Weight	1	2	3	Rank	1	2	3	Rank	Total	Rank
World Championships
2010	Antalya, Turkey	48 kg	~~63~~	63	~~66~~	25	~~83~~	~~83~~	83	23	146	24
2017	Anaheim, United States	48 kg	~~77~~	77	79	5	91	95	98	7	177	6
2018	Ashgabat, Turkmenistan	49 kg	~~83~~	83	~~85~~	7	100	~~105~~	105	3rd place, bronze medalist(s)	188	3rd place, bronze medalist(s)
European Championships
2008	Lignano Sabbiadoro, Italy	48 kg	60	~~63~~	~~63~~	7	75	~~80~~	~~82~~	7	135	7
2012	Antalya, Turkey	48 kg	78	~~81~~	~~81~~	4	95	~~98~~	~~98~~	4	173	4
2013	Tirana, Albania	48 kg	78	~~81~~	81	–	~~93~~	93	98	–	–	DSQ
2017	Split, Croatia	48 kg	72	~~75~~	75	3rd place, bronze medalist(s)	~~89~~	89	~~92~~	4	164	3rd place, bronze medalist(s)
2018	Bucharest, Romania	48 kg	75	79	~~80~~	1st place, gold medalist(s)	94	98	100	1st place, gold medalist(s)	179	1st place, gold medalist(s)
2019	(Georgia (country)) Batumi, Georgia	49 kg	82	85	87	1st place, gold medalist(s)	100	103	~~105~~	1st place, gold medalist(s)	190	1st place, gold medalist(s)
The British International Open
2019	(United Kingdom) Coventry, Great Britain	55 kg	80	84	~~88~~	1	85	95	~~102~~	4	179	3rd place, bronze medalist(s)
