= Ri Song-gum =

North Korean weightlifter (born 1997)

Ri Song Gum
Personal information
- Born: 17 October 1997 (age 29) North Korea
- Height: 140 cm (4 ft 7 in)
- Weight: 49 kg (108 lb)

Sport
- Country: North Korea
- Sport: Weightlifting
Medal record
Women's weightlifting
Representing North Korea
World Championships
Gold medal – first place	2024 Manama	–49 kg
Gold medal – first place	2025 Førde	–48 kg
Gold medal – first place	2026 Ningbo	–49 kg
Bronze medal – third place	2019 Pattaya	–49 kg
Asian Games
Gold medal – first place	2018 Jakarta-Palembang	–48 kg
Gold medal – first place	2022 Hangzhou	–49 kg
Gold medal – first place	2026 Aichi-Nagoya	–49 kg

Korean name
- Hangul: 리성금
- RR: Ri Seonggeum
- MR: Ri Sŏnggŭm

Ri Song Gum (Korean: 리성금; born 17 October 1997) is a North Korean weightlifter, competing in the 49 kg category and representing North Korea at international competitions.

She has competed at multiple World Championships and at the Asian Games. At the 2026 Asian Games she set three world records and won gold.

== Major results ==
Year	Venue	Weight	Snatch (kg)				Clean & Jerk (kg)				Total	Rank
Year	Venue	Weight	1	2	3	Rank	1	2	3	Rank	Total	Rank
World Championships
2015	Houston, United States	48 kg	77	81	~~83~~	8	107	110	~~111~~	1st place, gold medalist(s)	191	4
2018	Ashgabat, Turkmenistan	49 kg	~~85~~	~~85~~	~~85~~	—	~~103~~	103	—	6	—	—
2019	Pattaya, Thailand	49 kg	~~89~~	89	~~92~~	3rd place, bronze medalist(s)	~~115~~	115	~~118~~	3rd place, bronze medalist(s)	204	3rd place, bronze medalist(s)
2024	Manama, Bahrain	49 kg	91	~~95~~	~~98~~	2nd place, silver medalist(s)	119	122	~~126~~	1st place, gold medalist(s)	213	1st place, gold medalist(s)
2025	Førde, Norway	48 kg	88	~~91~~	91	1st place, gold medalist(s)	115	120	122	1st place, gold medalist(s)	213	1st place, gold medalist(s)
2026	Ningbo, China	49 kg	~~90~~	90	92	1st place, gold medalist(s)	115	119	~~122~~	1st place, gold medalist(s)	211	1st place, gold medalist(s)
Asian Games
2018	Jakarta, Indonesia	48 kg	85	87	~~90~~	2	112	~~117~~	~~117~~	1	199	1st place, gold medalist(s)
2023	Hangzhou, China	49 kg	~~90~~	92	~~95~~	2	117	122	124	1	216	1st place, gold medalist(s)
2026	Nagoya, Japan	49 kg	90	94	—	1	116	121	—	1	215	1st place, gold medalist(s)
Asian Championships
2019	Ningbo, China	49 kg	83	86	~~88~~	3rd place, bronze medalist(s)	109	114	~~117~~	2nd place, silver medalist(s)	200	2nd place, silver medalist(s)
2024	Tashkent, Uzbekistan	49 kg	90	~~95~~	95	1st place, gold medalist(s)	117	122	125	1st place, gold medalist(s)	220	1st place, gold medalist(s)
IWF World Cup
2019	Fuzhou, China	49 kg	80	~~84~~	84	2nd place, silver medalist(s)	105	109	~~112~~	2nd place, silver medalist(s)	193	2nd place, silver medalist(s)
2019	Tianjin, China	49 kg	~~87~~	87	91	3rd place, bronze medalist(s)	115	118	~~120~~	1st place, gold medalist(s)	209	2nd place, silver medalist(s)
2024	Phuket, Thailand	49 kg	91	95	97	2nd place, silver medalist(s)	120	124	~~126~~	1st place, gold medalist(s)	221	1st place, gold medalist(s)
IWF Grand Prix
2023	Doha, Qatar	49 kg	90	93	~~95~~	3rd place, bronze medalist(s)	~~120~~	120	~~124~~	1st place, gold medalist(s)	213	2nd place, silver medalist(s)
Summer Universiade
2017	New Taipei City, Taiwan	48 kg	81	84	86	1	103	107	~~111~~	1	193	1st place, gold medalist(s)
Junior World Championships
2015	Wrocław, Poland	48 kg	73	~~77~~	77	3rd place, bronze medalist(s)	100	104	~~107~~	3rd place, bronze medalist(s)	181	3rd place, bronze medalist(s)
Summer Youth Olympics
2014	Nanjing, China	48 kg	66	70	72	3	88	93	~~95~~	2	165	2nd place, silver medalist(s)
Youth Asian Championships
2014	Ningbo, China	44 kg	63	66	~~71~~	1st place, gold medalist(s)	83	88	93	1st place, gold medalist(s)	159	1st place, gold medalist(s)

== Table of world records ==
Ri Song-gum has set 14 senior world records.

Discipline	Result (kg)	Competition	Location	Date
49 kg (2018–2025)
Clean & jerk	122	Asian Games	Hangzhou, China	30 September 2023
Clean & jerk	124	Asian Games	Hangzhou, China	30 September 2023
Total	216	Asian Games	Hangzhou, China	30 September 2023
Total	217	Asian Championships	Tashkent, Uzbekistan	4 February 2024
Clean & jerk	125	Asian Championships	Tashkent, Uzbekistan	4 February 2024
Total	220	Asian Championships	Tashkent, Uzbekistan	4 February 2024
Total	221	IWF World Cup	Phuket, Thailand	1 April 2024
48 kg (June 2025–July 2026)
Clean & jerk	120	World Championships	Førde, Norway	2 October 2025
Total	211	World Championships	Førde, Norway	2 October 2025
Clean & jerk	122	World Championships	Førde, Norway	2 October 2025
Total	213	World Championships	Førde, Norway	2 October 2025
49 kg (from August 2026)
Snatch	94	Asian Games	Nagoya, Japan	23 September 2026
Clean & jerk	121	Asian Games	Nagoya, Japan	23 September 2026
Total	215	Asian Games	Nagoya, Japan	23 September 2026
