= Fang Wan-ling =

Taiwanese weightlifter (born 1999)

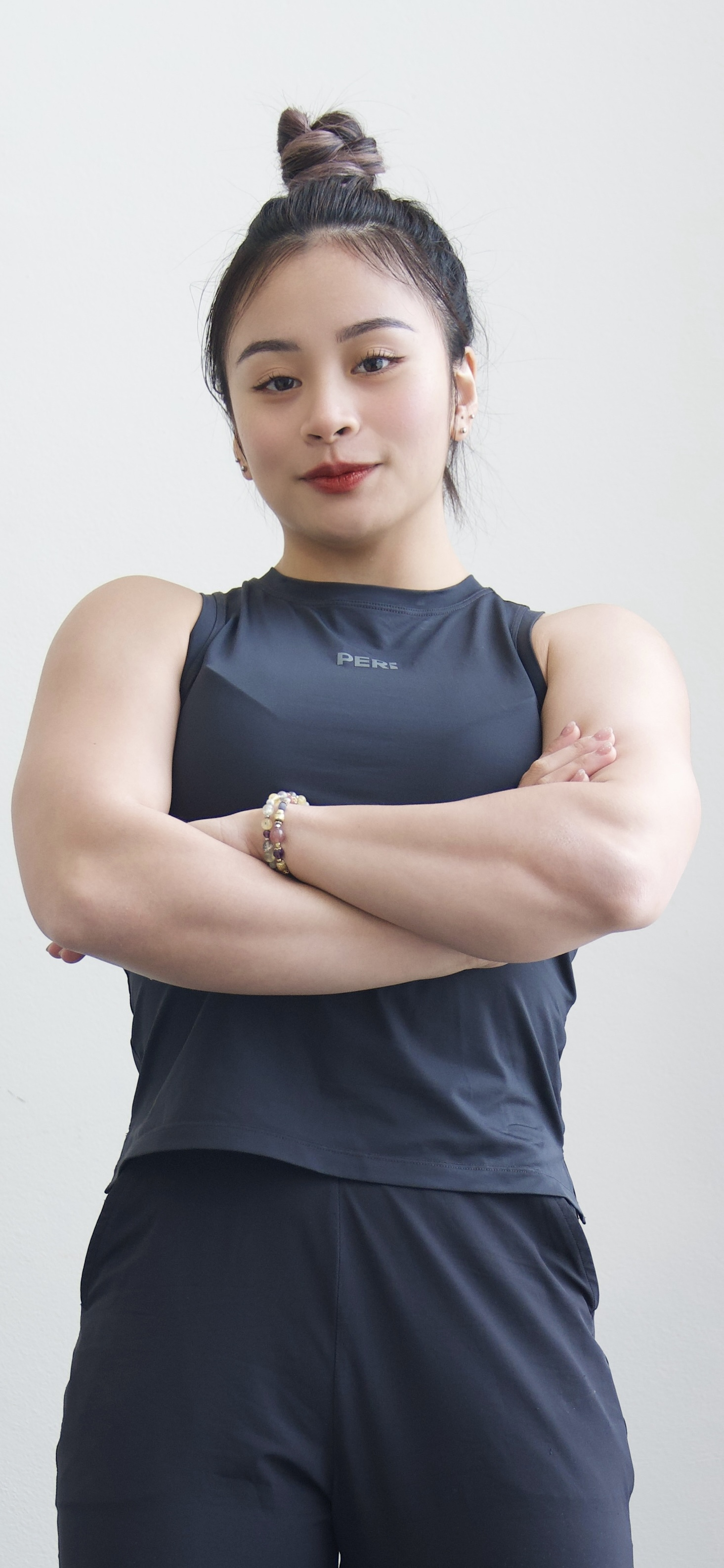

Personal information
- Born: 1 December 1999 (age 26)
- Height: 150 cm (4 ft 11 in)

Sport
- Country: Taiwan
- Sport: Weightlifting
Medal record
Women's weightlifting
Representing Chinese Taipei
Asian Championships
Silver medal – second place	2026 Gandhinagar	48 kg

Fang Wan-ling (Chinese: 方莞靈; born 1 December 1999) is a Taiwanese weightlifter.

== Career ==
In 2018, she competed in the women's 48 kg event at the Asian Games held in Jakarta, Indonesia. She finished in 6th place. She also competed in the women's 49 kg event at the 2018 World Weightlifting Championships held in Ashgabat, Turkmenistan.

In 2021, she finished in 6th place in the women's 49 kg event at the 2020 Asian Weightlifting Championships held in Tashkent, Uzbekistan.

Later that year, she represented Chinese Taipei at the 2020 Summer Olympics in Tokyo, Japan. She finished in 4th place in the women's 49 kg event.

In August 2024, Fang Wan-ling competed in the women's 49 kg event at the 2024 Summer Olympics held in Paris, France. She lifted 86 kg in Snatch and 107 kg in Clean & Jerk setting 193 kg in total and placing sixth in her second Olympic Games.

== Achievements ==
Year	Venue	Weight	Snatch (kg)				Clean & Jerk (kg)				Total	Rank
Year	Venue	Weight	1	2	3	Rank	1	2	3	Rank	Total	Rank
Summer Olympics
2021	Tokyo, Japan	49 kg	75	78	80	—N/a	98	101	~~103~~	—N/a	181	4
2024	Paris, France	49 kg	80	83	86	—N/a	102	~~106~~	107	—N/a	193	6
World Championships
2018	Ashgabat, Turkmenistan	49 kg	72	75	78	12	90	94	~~98~~	15	172	14
2023	Riyadh, Saudi Arabia	49 kg	70	75	80	12	95	100	105	8	185	10
2025	Førde, Norway	48 kg	75	78	80	8	95	100	103	8	183	7
IWF World Cup
2019	Fuzhou, China	49 kg	76	80	82	4	97	101	~~103~~	4	183	4
2024	Phuket, Thailand	49 kg	82	84	~~85~~	12	102	104	108	6	192	7
Asian Games
2018	Jakarta, Indonesia	48 kg	~~77~~	77	80	—N/a	96	~~99~~	~~99~~	—N/a	176	6
Asian Championships
2019	Ningbo, China	49 kg	69	73	~~75~~	10	86	~~91~~	91	10	164	10
2021	Tashkent, Uzbekistan	49 kg	76	~~80~~	~~80~~	6	95	100	~~103~~	5	176	6
2023	Jinju, South Korea	49 kg	75	80	~~82~~	10	95	98	101	11	181	13
2024	Tashkent, Uzbekistan	49 kg	80	82	~~84~~	6	~~102~~	102	~~106~~	5	184	6
