= Jiang Huihua =

Chinese weightlifter (born 1998)

Personal information
- Nationality: Chinese
- Born: 22 January 1998 (age 28)
- Weight: 48.95 kg (108 lb)

Sport
- Country: China
- Sport: Weightlifting
- Event: 49 kg
- Club: Guangxi Province

Achievements and titles
- Personal bests: Snatch: 95 kg (2023); Clean and jerk: 120 kg (2023, WR); Total: 215 kg (2023, WR)
Medal record
Women's weightlifting
Representing China
World Championships
| Gold medal – first place | 2015 Houston | –48 kg |
| Gold medal – first place | 2019 Pattaya | –49 kg |
| Gold medal – first place | 2022 Bogotá | –49 kg |
| Gold medal – first place | 2023 Riyadh | –49 kg |
| Silver medal – second place | 2018 Ashgabat | –49 kg |
Asian Championships
| Gold medal – first place | 2023 Jinju | –49 kg |
National Games of China
| Silver medal – second place | 2021 Shaanxi | –49 kg |

Jiang Huihua (Chinese: 蒋惠花; born 22 January 1998) is a Chinese weightlifter who won a gold medal at the 2015 Houston world championship.

== Major results ==
| Year | Venue | Weight | Snatch (kg) | | | | Clean & Jerk (kg) | | | | Total | Rank |
| Year | Venue | Weight | 1 | 2 | 3 | Rank | 1 | 2 | 3 | Rank | Total | Rank |
World Championships
| 2015 | Houston, United States | 48 kg | ~~88~~ | 88 | ~~91~~ | 1st place, gold medalist(s) | 106 | 108 | 110 | 2nd place, silver medalist(s) | 198 | 1st place, gold medalist(s) |
| 2018 | Ashgabat, Turkmenistan | 49 kg | 87 | 90 | 92 | 2nd place, silver medalist(s) | ~~108~~ | 108 | 114 | 2nd place, silver medalist(s) | 206 | 2nd place, silver medalist(s) |
| 2019 | Pattaya, Thailand | 49 kg | 89 | 92 | 94 | 2nd place, silver medalist(s) | 112 | ~~117~~ | 118 WR | 1st place, gold medalist(s) | 212 WR | 1st place, gold medalist(s) |
| 2022 | Bogotá, Colombia | 49 kg | 88 | 91 | 93 | 1st place, gold medalist(s) | 110 | 113 | ~~120~~ | 1st place, gold medalist(s) | 206 | 1st place, gold medalist(s) |
| 2023 | Riyadh, Saudi Arabia | 49 kg | 89 | 93 | 95 | 2nd place, silver medalist(s) | 112 | 117 | 120 WR | 1st place, gold medalist(s) | 215 WR | 1st place, gold medalist(s) |
World Junior Championships
| 2015 | Wrocław, Poland | 48 kg | 81 | 89 | 92 | 1st place, gold medalist(s) | 105 | 110 | 113 | 2nd place, silver medalist(s) | 205 | 1st place, gold medalist(s) |
| 2016 | (Georgia (country)) Tbilisi, Georgia | 48 kg | 81 | 85 | 86 | 1st place, gold medalist(s) | 100 | 105 | 107 | 2nd place, silver medalist(s) | 193 | 2nd place, silver medalist(s) |
Youth Olympic Games
| 2014 | Nanjing, China | 48 kg | 80 | ~~85~~ | 88 | 1 | 90 | 100 | 105 | 1 | 193 | 1st place, gold medalist(s) |
Asian Youth Games
| 2013 | Nanjing, China | 48 kg | 71 | 76 | 83 | 1 | 85 | 93 | 100 | 1 | 183 | 1st place, gold medalist(s) |
Asian Youth Championships
| 2014 | Bangsaen, Thailand | 48 kg | 70 | 85 | ~~89~~ | 1st place, gold medalist(s) | 85 | ~~100~~ | -- | 1st place, gold medalist(s) | 170 | 1st place, gold medalist(s) |
