= Hou Zhihui =

Chinese weightlifter (born 1997)

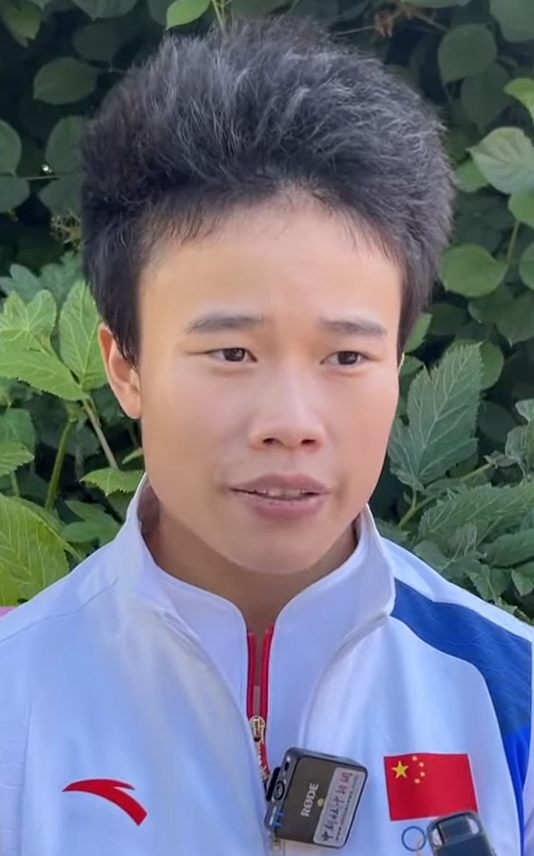
- Hou in 2024

Personal information
- Nationality: Chinese
- Born: 18 March 1997 (age 29) Meitang Village, Zhangshi Town, Guiyang County, Chenzhou, Hunan, China
- Height: 1.48 m (4 ft 10 in)
- Weight: 48.85 kg (108 lb)

Sport
- Country: China
- Sport: Weightlifting
- Event: –49 kg
- Club: Hunan Province
Medal record
Olympic Games
Gold medal – first place	2020 Tokyo	–49 kg
Gold medal – first place	2024 Paris	–49 kg
World Championships
Gold medal – first place	2018 Ashgabat	–49 kg
Silver medal – second place	2019 Pattaya	–49 kg
Silver medal – second place	2023 Riyadh	–49 kg
Bronze medal – third place	2022 Bogotá	–49 kg
Asian Championships
Gold medal – first place	2019 Ningbo	–49 kg
Gold medal – first place	2020 Tashkent	–49 kg
Silver medal – second place	2023 Jinju	–49 kg
Junior World Championships
Silver medal – second place	2015 Wroclaw	–48 kg
National Games of China
Gold medal – first place	2017 Tianjin	–48 kg
Gold medal – first place	2021 Shaanxi	–49 kg
Gold medal – first place	2025 Guandong	–49 kg

Hou Zhihui (Chinese: 侯志慧; pinyin: Hóu Zhìhuì; born 18 March 1997) is a Chinese weightlifter, two-times Olympic champion, World champion, and two-time Asian champion competing in the women's 49 kg category.

As of 2021, she has set eleven senior world records throughout her career.

== Career ==
She competed at the 2018 World Weightlifting Championships in the 49 kg division, winning silvers medals in all lifts, and setting two world records in the total.

In 2019 she competed at the 2019 IWF World Cup held in Fuzhou, China, in the 49 kg category. She swept gold medals in all lifts setting new world records in the snatch and total.

In 2021 at the 2020 Summer Olympics, she won China's second gold medal in women's 49 kg weightlifting, setting new Olympic records in the snatch, clean and jerk, and overall total, with 210 kilograms, which is three short of her world record from the 2020 Asian Weightlifting Championships.

She won the bronze medal in the women's 49 kg event at the 2022 World Weightlifting Championships held in Bogotá, Colombia.

In August 2024, she again competed in the women's 49 kg event at the 2024 Summer Olympics held in Paris, France. She placed second in the Snatch with 89 kg, but she broke the Olympic record in the Clean & Jerk, lifting 117 kg and overcame Romania's Mihaela Cambei with 1 kg ahead in total.

=== Debunked Doping Allegations ===
On 26 July 2021, Indian news outlet ANI falsely reported that Hou, the new Women's 49 kg weightlifting olympic champion, would be tested by the International Testing Agency (ITA) for doping, according to ANI's unnamed source. Huo had won gold against India's Mirabai Chanu, who won silver. The article claimed Mirabai Chanu would be upgraded to a gold medal if the tests were positive. This report was subsequently propagated across other news networks, including The Economic Times, Business Standard, India.com and Taiwan News. The World Anti-Doping Agency and ITA debunked the reports, saying they knew nothing of such tests being carried out and that any developments would be transparently reported on their site. On 30 July, ANI reported that no such test occurred, and claimed they made an "inadvertent error while reporting the news". As of 8 October, ANI's original false report remained on its website.

== Major results ==
Year	Venue	Weight	Snatch (kg)				Clean & Jerk (kg)				Total	Rank
Year	Venue	Weight	1	2	3	Rank	1	2	3	Rank	Total	Rank
Olympic Games
2021	Tokyo, Japan	49 kg	88	92	94 OR	1	109	114	116 OR	1	210 OR	1st place, gold medalist(s)
2024	Paris, France	49 kg	~~89~~	89	~~93~~	2	110	~~117~~	117 OR	1	206	1st place, gold medalist(s)
World Championships
2018	Ashgabat, Turkmenistan	49 kg	88	~~92~~	93	1st place, gold medalist(s)	108	112	115	1st place, gold medalist(s)	208 WR	1st place, gold medalist(s)
2019	Pattaya, Thailand	49 kg	89	94	~~96~~	1st place, gold medalist(s)	110	~~116~~	117	2nd place, silver medalist(s)	211 WR	2nd place, silver medalist(s)
2022	Bogotá, Colombia	49 kg	86	89	~~92~~	3rd place, bronze medalist(s)	106	109	—	4	198	3rd place, bronze medalist(s)
2023	Riyadh, Saudi Arabia	49 kg	89	93	95	1st place, gold medalist(s)	111	116	~~119~~	2nd place, silver medalist(s)	211	2nd place, silver medalist(s)
IWF World Cup
2019	Fuzhou, China	49 kg	90	94 WR	~~96~~	1st place, gold medalist(s)	111	116	—	1st place, gold medalist(s)	210 WR	1st place, gold medalist(s)
2024	Phuket, Thailand	49 kg	93	97 CWR	~~99~~	1st place, gold medalist(s)	113	~~120~~	120	2nd place, silver medalist(s)	217	2nd place, silver medalist(s)
Asian Games
2023	Hangzhou, China	55 kg	90	95	~~97~~	—N/a	110	115	—	—N/a	210	3rd place, bronze medalist(s)
Asian Championships
2019	Ningbo, China	49 kg	88	92	~~95~~	1st place, gold medalist(s)	109	113	116	1st place, gold medalist(s)	208	1st place, gold medalist(s)
2021	Tashkent, Uzbekistan	49 kg	90	94	96 WR	1st place, gold medalist(s)	110	115	117	3rd place, bronze medalist(s)	213 WR	1st place, gold medalist(s)
2023	Jinju, South Korea	49 kg	86	89	93	2nd place, silver medalist(s)	107	111	~~115~~	3rd place, bronze medalist(s)	204	2nd place, silver medalist(s)
