= 2023 World Weightlifting Championships – Women's 71 kg =

The women's 71 kilograms competition at the 2023 World Weightlifting Championships was held between 11 and 13 September 2023.

== Schedule ==
| Date | Time | Event |
|---|---|---|
| 11 September 2023 | 09:00 | Group E |
| 11 September 2023 | 21:30 | Group D |
| 12 September 2023 | 18:30 | Group C |
| 13 September 2023 | 11:30 | Group B |
| 13 September 2023 | 19:00 | Group A |

== Medalists ==
| Event | Gold | | Silver | | Bronze | |
|---|---|---|---|---|---|---|
| Snatch | Liao Guifang (CHN) | 120 kg | Angie Palacios (ECU) | 117 kg | Olivia Reeves (USA) | 111 kg |
| Clean & Jerk | Liao Guifang (CHN) | 153 kg | Olivia Reeves (USA) | 142 kg | Angie Palacios (ECU) | 138 kg |
| Total | Liao Guifang (CHN) | 273 kg | Angie Palacios (ECU) | 255 kg | Olivia Reeves (USA) | 253 kg |

== Records ==
Prior to this competition, the existing world records were as follows.

| World Record | Snatch | Angie Palacios (ECU) | 121 kg | Havana, Cuba | 14 June 2023 |
| World Record | Clean & Jerk | Zhang Wangli (CHN) | 152 kg | Ashgabat, Turkmenistan | 6 November 2018 |
| World Record | Total | Liao Guifang (CHN) | 268 kg | Jinju, South Korea | 9 May 2023 |

== Results ==
| Rank | Athlete | Group | Snatch (kg) | | | | Clean & Jerk (kg) | | | | Total |
| Rank | Athlete | Group | 1 | 2 | 3 | Rank | 1 | 2 | 3 | Rank | Total |
|---|---|---|---|---|---|---|---|---|---|---|---|
| 1st place, gold medalist(s) | Liao Guifang (CHN) | A | ~~115~~ | 115 | 120 | 1st place, gold medalist(s) | 143 | 149 | 153 WR | 1st place, gold medalist(s) | 273 CWR |
| 2nd place, silver medalist(s) | Angie Palacios (ECU) | A | ~~113~~ | 113 | 117 | 2nd place, silver medalist(s) | 131 | 135 | 138 | 3rd place, bronze medalist(s) | 255 |
| 3rd place, bronze medalist(s) | Olivia Reeves (USA) | A | 105 | 108 | 111 | 3rd place, bronze medalist(s) | 133 | 138 | 142 JWR | 2nd place, silver medalist(s) | 253 JWR |
| 4 | Neama Said (EGY) | A | 106 | ~~109~~ | 110 | 4 | 130 | ~~135~~ | 136 | 5 | 246 |
| 5 | Katherine Vibert (USA) | A | ~~107~~ | 107 | ~~111~~ | 8 | ~~133~~ | 133 | 137 | 4 | 244 |
| 6 | Siuzanna Valodzka (AIN) | A | ~~104~~ | 104 | 107 | 9 | 132 | 135 | ~~138~~ | 6 | 242 |
| 7 | Mari Sánchez (COL) | A | 105 | 108 | ~~111~~ | 5 | 128 | 132 | ~~135~~ | 7 | 240 |
| 8 | Amanda Schott (BRA) | A | 103 | ~~106~~ | 108 | 6 | 125 | 130 | ~~132~~ | 11 | 238 |
| 9 | Miyareth Mendoza (COL) | A | 103 | 106 | ~~108~~ | 10 | 124 | 129 | 131 | 9 | 237 |
| 10 | Chen Wen-huei (TPE) | C | 99 | 104 | ~~107~~ | 11 | 131 | ~~136~~ | ~~136~~ | 8 | 235 |
| 11 | Phạm Thị Hồng Thanh (VIE) | B | 100 | 104 | ~~107~~ | 12 | ~~125~~ | 125 | 130 | 10 | 234 |
| 12 | Yeniuska Mirabal (CUB) | C | 95 | 100 | 102 | 15 | 122 | 127 | ~~130~~ | 16 | 229 |
| 13 | Giulia Miserendino (ITA) | A | 107 | ~~110~~ | ~~112~~ | 7 | 122 | ~~128~~ | ~~129~~ | 23 | 229 |
| 14 | Joy Ogbonne Eze (NGR) | D | ~~100~~ | 100 | ~~105~~ | 17 | 122 | 127 | ~~132~~ | 15 | 227 |
| 15 | Runa Segawa (JPN) | C | ~~94~~ | 94 | 98 | 23 | ~~123~~ | 129 | ~~131~~ | 12 | 227 |
| 16 | Jessica Jarquín (MEX) | C | 95 | 98 | ~~101~~ | 22 | 122 | 127 | ~~130~~ | 17 | 225 |
| 17 | Eygló Fanndal Sturludóttir (ISL) | B | 95 | 99 | 102 | 16 | 116 | 120 | 123 | 21 | 225 |
| 18 | Alexis Ashworth (CAN) | B | 100 | ~~103~~ | ~~103~~ | 18 | 125 | ~~128~~ | ~~128~~ | 19 | 225 |
| 19 | Kristel Macrohon (PHI) | B | 97 | ~~100~~ | ~~101~~ | 28 | 123 | ~~128~~ | 128 | 14 | 225 |
| 20 | Miku Ishii (JPN) | C | 98 | 102 | ~~104~~ | 14 | 121 | ~~126~~ | ~~126~~ | 24 | 223 |
| 21 | Mun Min-hee (KOR) | B | 95 | 100 | ~~103~~ | 19 | ~~123~~ | 123 | ~~128~~ | 20 | 223 |
| 22 | Diana García (MEX) | C | ~~93~~ | 93 | ~~96~~ | 36 | 123 | ~~128~~ | 128 | 13 | 221 |
| 23 | Celia Gold (ISR) | C | 93 | 97 | ~~100~~ | 27 | 122 | ~~127~~ | ~~128~~ | 22 | 219 |
| 24 | Anna Ylisoini (FIN) | B | 98 | ~~101~~ | ~~101~~ | 25 | 114 | 117 | 120 | 28 | 218 |
| 25 | Erin Barton (GBR) | D | 89 | ~~92~~ | 92 | 37 | 118 | ~~122~~ | 125 | 18 | 217 |
| 26 | Zeng Tiantian (CHN) | B | ~~95~~ | ~~95~~ | 95 | 33 | ~~120~~ | 120 | ~~123~~ | 27 | 215 |
| 27 | Martyna Dołęga (POL) | D | 95 | ~~98~~ | ~~98~~ | 30 | 110 | 118 | ~~122~~ | 29 | 213 |
| 28 | Ketty Lent (MRI) | E | 87 | 92 | 96 | 29 | 108 | 114 | ~~121~~ | 34 | 210 |
| 29 | Nicole Rubanovich (ISR) | C | 95 | ~~98~~ | ~~98~~ | 31 | 115 | ~~119~~ | ~~120~~ | 32 | 210 |
| 30 | Daniela Gherman (SWE) | C | ~~95~~ | 95 | ~~99~~ | 32 | ~~115~~ | ~~115~~ | 115 | 33 | 210 |
| 31 | Lijana Jakaitė (LTU) | D | 94 | ~~97~~ | ~~97~~ | 34 | 114 | ~~117~~ | ~~117~~ | 35 | 208 |
| 32 | Aino Luostarinen (FIN) | D | 87 | 90 | ~~92~~ | 38 | 112 | ~~115~~ | 115 | 31 | 205 |
| 33 | Chaima Rahmouni (TUN) | D | 88 | 90 | ~~92~~ | 39 | 110 | 113 | ~~115~~ | 37 | 203 |
| 34 | Mahassen Fattouh (LBN) | E | ~~85~~ | 85 | ~~90~~ | 44 | 105 | 110 | 115 | 30 | 200 |
| 35 | Yekaterina Stolyarenko (KAZ) | E | 83 | 86 | ~~88~~ | 43 | 107 | 111 | 113 | 36 | 199 |
| 36 | Kidaisha López (PUR) | E | ~~87~~ | ~~87~~ | 87 | 42 | 105 | 108 | 110 | 38 | 197 |
| 37 | Rkia Sabihi (MAR) | E | 84 | ~~88~~ | 88 | 40 | 105 | ~~110~~ | ~~112~~ | 41 | 193 |
| 38 | Nadezhda Li (KAZ) | E | 83 | ~~87~~ | 87 | 41 | ~~105~~ | ~~105~~ | 105 | 42 | 192 |
| 39 | Gombosürengiin Enerel (MGL) | E | ~~83~~ | 83 | ~~86~~ | 45 | 108 | ~~111~~ | ~~112~~ | 39 | 191 |
| 40 | Gillian Barry (IRL) | E | ~~80~~ | 80 | ~~83~~ | 46 | 102 | 105 | 107 | 40 | 187 |
| 41 | Rachael Enock (KEN) | E | 70 | 74 | 77 | 47 | 80 | 85 | ~~88~~ | 44 | 162 |
| 42 | Mai Al-Madani (UAE) | E | ~~70~~ | 71 | 73 | 48 | 85 | ~~88~~ | ~~88~~ | 43 | 158 |
| — | Vanessa Sarno (PHI) | B | ~~100~~ | 100 | ~~104~~ | 20 | — | — | — | — | — |
| — | Lisa Schweizer (GER) | B | ~~103~~ | 103 | ~~105~~ | 13 | ~~121~~ | ~~121~~ | ~~122~~ | — | — |
| — | Nuray Güngör (TUR) | B | ~~100~~ | ~~100~~ | ~~101~~ | — | 118 | 121 | ~~124~~ | 25 | — |
| — | Sarah Davies (GBR) | B | 98 | ~~101~~ | ~~101~~ | 24 | ~~124~~ | ~~125~~ | ~~125~~ | — | — |
| — | Laura Peinado (VEN) | C | 95 | ~~99~~ | 99 | 21 | ~~115~~ | ~~115~~ | ~~115~~ | — | — |
| — | Restu Anggi (INA) | D | ~~90~~ | ~~90~~ | ~~90~~ | — | ~~115~~ | 115 | 120 | 26 | — |
| — | Jacqueline Nichele (AUS) | D | 91 | 94 | 97 | 26 | ~~121~~ | ~~121~~ | ~~121~~ | — | — |
| — | Sarah Cochrane (AUS) | D | 94 | ~~98~~ | ~~99~~ | 35 | ~~118~~ | ~~118~~ | — | — | — |
| — | Monika Marach (POL) | E | — | — | — | — | — | — | — | — | — |
| — | Loredana Toma (ROU) | E | — | — | — | — | — | — | — | — | — |
| — | Maximina Uepa (NRU) | E | — | — | — | — | — | — | — | — | — |
| — | Line Ravn Gude (DEN) | D | Did not start | | | | | | | | |
| — | Megan Trupp (CAN) | D | Did not start | | | | | | | | |
| — | Ilia Hernández (ESP) | E | Did not start | | | | | | | | |
