= 2022 World Weightlifting Championships – Women's 71 kg =

The women's 71 kilograms competition at the 2022 World Weightlifting Championships was held on 11 and 12 December 2022.

== Schedule ==
Date	Time	Event
11 December 2022	09:00	Group D
11 December 2022	21:30	Group C
12 December 2022	11:30	Group B
12 December 2022	19:00	Group A

== Medalists ==
Event	Gold		Silver		Bronze	
Snatch	Loredana Toma (ROU)	119 kg	Angie Palacios (ECU)	116 kg	Zeng Tiantian (CHN)	113 kg
Clean & Jerk	Liao Guifang (CHN)	140 kg	Zeng Tiantian (CHN)	140 kg	Olivia Reeves (USA)	139 kg
Total	Loredana Toma (ROU)	256 kg	Zeng Tiantian (CHN)	253 kg	Angie Palacios (ECU)	252 kg

== Records ==
Prior to this competition, the existing world records were as follows.

World Record	Snatch	World Standard	117 kg	—	1 November 2018
World Record	Clean & Jerk	Zhang Wangli (CHN)	152 kg	Ashgabat, Turkmenistan	6 November 2018
World Record	Total	Zhang Wangli (CHN)	267 kg	Ashgabat, Turkmenistan	6 November 2018

== Results ==
Rank	Athlete	Group	Snatch (kg)				Clean & Jerk (kg)				Total
Rank	Athlete	Group	1	2	3	Rank	1	2	3	Rank	Total
1st place, gold medalist(s)	Loredana Toma (ROU)	A	113	117	119 CWR	1st place, gold medalist(s)	133	137	~~140~~	4	256
2nd place, silver medalist(s)	Zeng Tiantian (CHN)	A	105	110	113	3rd place, bronze medalist(s)	135	140	~~144~~	2nd place, silver medalist(s)	253
3rd place, bronze medalist(s)	Angie Palacios (ECU)	A	110	~~115~~	116	2nd place, silver medalist(s)	132	136	~~140~~	5	252
4	Liao Guifang (CHN)	A	110	~~116~~	~~118~~	5	140	~~147~~	~~147~~	1st place, gold medalist(s)	250
5	Olivia Reeves (USA)	A	~~103~~	103	106	9	132	136	139	3rd place, bronze medalist(s)	245
6	Mari Sánchez (COL)	A	108	111	~~113~~	4	133	~~136~~	~~137~~	7	244
7	Katherine Vibert (USA)	A	103	106	~~109~~	8	132	~~136~~	136	6	242
8	Marie Fegue (FRA)	A	105	110	~~114~~	6	131	~~136~~	~~137~~	8	241
9	Giulia Miserendino (ITA)	A	103	107	110	7	123	~~127~~	~~127~~	14	233
10	Kristel Macrohon (PHI)	B	95	100	104	10	125	~~128~~	128	9	232
11	Amanda Schott (BRA)	B	100	103	~~104~~	11	~~122~~	~~123~~	125	11	228
12	Laura Peinado (VEN)	B	98	~~102~~	102	13	120	123	~~125~~	13	225
13	Vanessa Sarno (PHI)	B	90	96	99	16	125	~~128~~	~~128~~	10	224
14	Sarah Davies (GBR)	A	~~99~~	99	~~103~~	17	124	~~127~~	~~130~~	12	223
15	Miku Ishii (JPN)	C	97	~~100~~	101	14	~~121~~	121	~~124~~	16	222
16	Lisa Schweizer (GER)	B	97	100	102	12	114	118	~~121~~	20	220
17	Sumire Hashimoto (JPN)	C	~~92~~	92	95	19	118	121	~~126~~	15	216
18	Mun Min-hee (KOR)	B	95	~~99~~	~~101~~	20	120	~~125~~	~~125~~	17	215
19	Eygló Fanndal Sturludóttir (ISL)	C	90	94	~~98~~	25	115	119	~~123~~	18	213
20	Nicole Rubanovich (ISR)	B	~~95~~	95	~~98~~	21	111	116	~~119~~	22	211
21	Daiana Serrano (DOM)	B	90	~~95~~	95	22	115	—	—	23	210
22	Tsabitha Alfiah Ramadani (INA)	C	94	~~100~~	~~100~~	24	~~114~~	114	~~119~~	24	208
23	Ilia Hernández (ESP)	C	~~90~~	90	~~95~~	30	117	~~121~~	~~122~~	21	207
24	Restu Anggi (INA)	C	~~88~~	88	~~92~~	34	115	119	~~121~~	19	207
25	Megan Trupp (CAN)	D	91	95	~~98~~	18	~~110~~	~~110~~	110	30	205
26	Kidaisha López (PUR)	D	88	91	94	23	~~110~~	110	~~112~~	28	204
27	Manon Angonese (BEL)	C	88	~~91~~	91	28	110	~~112~~	113	25	204
28	Janette Ylisoini (FIN)	D	88	91	93	26	107	~~110~~	110	29	203
29	Line Gude (DEN)	C	90	~~92~~	~~93~~	29	112	~~117~~	~~119~~	26	202
30	Maximina Uepa (NRU)	D	89	~~91~~	91	27	110	~~115~~	~~115~~	27	201
31	Jutta Selin (FIN)	D	87	89	~~91~~	31	108	~~111~~	~~111~~	32	197
32	Lijana Jakaitė (LTU)	D	88	~~91~~	~~91~~	32	109	~~111~~	~~111~~	31	197
33	Tatiana Salas (CRC)	D	~~83~~	83	88	33	~~103~~	~~103~~	103	33	191
34	Rachael Enock (KEN)	D	65	73	~~76~~	36	~~80~~	80	~~83~~	34	153
35	Emma Imsirovic (BOT)	D	60	62	~~65~~	37	70	76	~~80~~	35	138
—	Alexis Ashworth (CAN)	B	95	98	101	15	~~118~~	~~118~~	~~118~~	—	—
—	Elaheh Razzaghi (IRI)	C	~~87~~	87	~~91~~	35	~~111~~	~~111~~	~~113~~	—	—
—	Chen Wen-huei (TPE)	A	—	—	—	—	—	—	—	—	—
—	Mahassen Fattouh (LBN)	C	—	—	—	—	—	—	—	—	—
