= Roma 2020 Weightlifting World Cup =

Roma 2020 World Cup
- Location: Rome, Italy
- Dates: 27–31 January
- Competitors: 155

The Roma 2020 World Cup in weightlifting was held in Rome, Italy from 27 to 31 January 2020. It was also a qualification event for the 2020 Summer Olympics in Tokyo.

== Medal overview ==
=== Men ===
Event		Gold		Silver		Bronze	
– 55 kg	Snatch	Nguyễn Trần Anh Tuấn (VIE)	112 kg				
– 55 kg	Clean & Jerk	Nguyễn Trần Anh Tuấn (VIE)	143 kg				
– 55 kg	Total	Nguyễn Trần Anh Tuấn (VIE)	255 kg				
– 61 kg	Snatch	Thạch Kim Tuấn (VIE)	132 kg	Shota Mishvelidze (GEO)	131 kg	Mirco Scarantino (ITA)	118 kg
– 61 kg	Clean & Jerk	Thạch Kim Tuấn (VIE)	161 kg	Shota Mishvelidze (GEO)	155 kg	Jon Luke Mau (GER)	154 kg
– 61 kg	Total	Thạch Kim Tuấn (VIE)	293 kg	Shota Mishvelidze (GEO)	286 kg	John Ceniza (PHI)	269 kg
– 67 kg	Snatch	Mirko Zanni (ITA)	140 kg	Simon Brandhuber (GER)	138 kg	Víctor Castro (ESP)	134 kg
– 67 kg	Clean & Jerk	Mirko Zanni (ITA)	165 kg	Simon Brandhuber (GER)	160 kg	Goga Chkheidze (GEO)	158 kg
– 67 kg	Total	Mirko Zanni (ITA)	305 kg	Simon Brandhuber (GER)	298 kg	Goga Chkheidze (GEO)	291 kg
– 73 kg	Snatch	Marin Robu (MDA)	152 kg	Karem Ben Hnia (TUN)	149 kg	Sergey Petrov (RUS)	147 kg
– 73 kg	Clean & Jerk	Karem Ben Hnia (TUN)	184 kg	Marin Robu (MDA)	180 kg	Salvatore Esposito (ITA)	170 kg
– 73 kg	Total	Karem Ben Hnia (TUN)	333 kg	Marin Robu (MDA)	332 kg	Sergey Petrov (RUS)	312 kg
– 81 kg	Snatch	Antonino Pizzolato (ITA)	160 kg	Harrison Maurus (USA)	158 kg	Alex Bellemarre (CAN)	148 kg
– 81 kg	Clean & Jerk	Antonino Pizzolato (ITA)	195 kg	Harrison Maurus (USA)	195 kg	David Sánchez (ESP)	176 kg
– 81 kg	Total	Antonino Pizzolato (ITA)	355 kg	Harrison Maurus (USA)	353 kg	Alex Bellemarre (CAN)	323 kg
– 89 kg	Snatch	Olfides Sáez (CUB)	163 kg	Theodoros Iakovidis (GRE)	159 kg	Eero Retulainen (FIN)	148 kg
– 89 kg	Clean & Jerk	Olfides Sáez (CUB)	196 kg	Theodoros Iakovidis (GRE)	195 kg	Travis Cooper (USA)	181 kg
– 89 kg	Total	Olfides Sáez (CUB)	359 kg	Theodoros Iakovidis (GRE)	354 kg	Travis Cooper (USA)	326 kg
– 96 kg	Snatch	Anton Pliesnoi (GEO)	176 kg	Boady Santavy (CAN)	175 kg	Khetag Khugaev (RUS)	165 kg
– 96 kg	Clean & Jerk	Anton Pliesnoi (GEO)	210 kg	Boady Santavy (CAN)	205 kg	Tudor Ciobanu (MDA)	198 kg
– 96 kg	Total	Anton Pliesnoi (GEO)	386 kg	Boady Santavy (CAN)	380 kg	Khetag Khugaev (RUS)	362 kg
– 102 kg	Snatch	Artur Mugurdumov (ISR)	160 kg	Hannes Keskitalo (FIN)	145 kg	Gianni Agustin (SMR)	105 kg
– 102 kg	Clean & Jerk	Artur Mugurdumov (ISR)	203 kg	Hannes Keskitalo (FIN)	180 kg	Gianni Agustin (SMR)	135 kg
– 102 kg	Total	Artur Mugurdumov (ISR)	363 kg	Hannes Keskitalo (FIN)	325 kg	Gianni Agustin (SMR)	240 kg
– 109 kg	Snatch	Rodion Bochkov (RUS)	182 kg	Timur Naniev (RUS)	182 kg	Dmytro Chumak (UKR)	180 kg
– 109 kg	Clean & Jerk	Dmytro Chumak (UKR)	225 kg	Timur Naniev (RUS)	222 kg	Seo Hui-yeop (KOR)	213 kg
– 109 kg	Total	Dmytro Chumak (UKR)	405 kg	Timur Naniev (RUS)	404 kg	Rodion Bochkov (RUS)	393 kg
+ 109 kg	Snatch	Lasha Talakhadze (GEO)	215 kg	Antoniy Savchuk (RUS)	184 kg	Sargis Martirosjan (AUT)	181 kg
+ 109 kg	Clean & Jerk	Lasha Talakhadze (GEO)	255 kg	Antoniy Savchuk (RUS)	228 kg	David Liti (NZL)	215 kg
+ 109 kg	Total	Lasha Talakhadze (GEO)	470 kg	Antoniy Savchuk (RUS)	412 kg	David Litvinov (ISR)	393 kg

=== Women ===
Event		Gold		Silver		Bronze	
– 45 kg	Snatch	Khổng Mỹ Phượng (VIE)	73 kg	Cicely Kyle (USA)	70 kg	Maria Giacomone (SMR)	50 kg
– 45 kg	Clean & Jerk	Cicely Kyle (USA)	93 kg	Khổng Mỹ Phượng (VIE)	82 kg	Maria Giacomone (SMR)	55 kg
– 45 kg	Total	Cicely Kyle (USA)	163 kg	Khổng Mỹ Phượng (VIE)	155 kg	Maria Giacomone (SMR)	105 kg
– 49 kg	Snatch	Jourdan Delacruz (USA)	87 kg	Morghan King (USA)	82 kg	Ludia Montero (CUB)	82 kg
– 49 kg	Clean & Jerk	Jourdan Delacruz (USA)	108 kg	Morghan King (USA)	103 kg	Vương Thị Huyền (VIE)	100 kg
– 49 kg	Total	Jourdan Delacruz (USA)	195 kg	Morghan King (USA)	185 kg	Vương Thị Huyền (VIE)	181 kg
– 55 kg	Snatch	Hidilyn Diaz (PHI)	93 kg	Kamila Konotop (UKR)	90 kg	Nouha Landoulsi (TUN)	86 kg
– 55 kg	Clean & Jerk	Hidilyn Diaz (PHI)	119 kg	Kristina Novitskaia (RUS)	109 kg	Nouha Landoulsi (TUN)	108 kg
– 55 kg	Total	Hidilyn Diaz (PHI)	212 kg	Kamila Konotop (UKR)	196 kg	Nouha Landoulsi (TUN)	194 kg
– 59 kg	Snatch	Hoàng Thị Duyên (VIE)	97 kg	Maria Grazia Alemanno (ITA)	89 kg	Tali Darsigny (CAN)	88 kg
– 59 kg	Clean & Jerk	Hoàng Thị Duyên (VIE)	116 kg	Marianne Saarhelo (FIN)	113 kg	Chaima Rahmouni (TUN)	111 kg
– 59 kg	Total	Hoàng Thị Duyên (VIE)	213 kg	Marianne Saarhelo (FIN)	199 kg	Tali Darsigny (CAN)	198 kg
– 64 kg	Snatch	Loredana Toma (ROU)	113 kg	Maude Charron (CAN)	105 kg	Giorgia Bordignon (ITA)	102 kg
– 64 kg	Clean & Jerk	Loredana Toma (ROU)	136 kg	Maude Charron (CAN)	130 kg	Giorgia Bordignon (ITA)	123 kg
– 64 kg	Total	Loredana Toma (ROU)	249 kg	Maude Charron (CAN)	235 kg	Giorgia Bordignon (ITA)	225 kg
– 71 kg	Snatch	Meredith Alwine (USA)	103 kg	Alessia Durante (ITA)	95 kg	Nicole Rubanovich (ISR)	95 kg
– 71 kg	Clean & Jerk	Meredith Alwine (USA)	134 kg	Alessia Durante (ITA)	115 kg	Kristel Macrohon (PHI)	115 kg
– 71 kg	Total	Meredith Alwine (USA)	237 kg	Alessia Durante (ITA)	210 kg	Kristel Macrohon (PHI)	209 kg
– 76 kg	Snatch	Iryna Dekha (UKR)	106 kg	Patricia Strenius (SWE)	104 kg	Kristel Ngarlem (CAN)	99 kg
– 76 kg	Clean & Jerk	Kristel Ngarlem (CAN)	134 kg	Patricia Strenius (SWE)	130 kg	Iryna Dekha (UKR)	130 kg
– 76 kg	Total	Iryna Dekha (UKR)	236 kg	Patricia Strenius (SWE)	234 kg	Kristel Ngarlem (CAN)	233 kg
– 81 kg	Snatch	Eileen Cikamatana (AUS)	115 kg	Jessie Bradley (USA)	105 kg	Anna Van Bellinghen (BEL)	105 kg
– 81 kg	Clean & Jerk	Eileen Cikamatana (AUS)	140 kg	Jessie Bradley (USA)	134 kg	Anna Van Bellinghen (BEL)	122 kg
– 81 kg	Total	Eileen Cikamatana (AUS)	255 kg	Jessie Bradley (USA)	239 kg	Anna Van Bellinghen (BEL)	227 kg
– 87 kg	Snatch	Kang Yeoun-hee (KOR)	103 kg	Lee Ji-eun (KOR)	100 kg	Marie Vennekilde (DEN)	99 kg
– 87 kg	Clean & Jerk	Kang Yeoun-hee (KOR)	129 kg	Elena Cîlcic (MDA)	126 kg	Sarah Fischer (AUT)	123 kg
– 87 kg	Total	Kang Yeoun-hee (KOR)	232 kg	Elena Cîlcic (MDA)	224 kg	Sarah Fischer (AUT)	221 kg
+ 87 kg	Snatch	Laurel Hubbard (NZL)	126 kg	Anastasiya Lysenko (UKR)	124 kg	Mercy Brown (GBR)	96 kg
+ 87 kg	Clean & Jerk	Laurel Hubbard (NZL)	144 kg	Anastasiya Lysenko (UKR)	142 kg	Magdalena Karolak (POL)	132 kg
+ 87 kg	Total	Laurel Hubbard (NZL)	270 kg	Anastasiya Lysenko (UKR)	266 kg	Magdalena Karolak (POL)	225 kg
