= 2024 World Weightlifting Championships – Women's 71 kg =

Women's 71 kg at the 2024 World Weightlifting Championships
- Venue: Weightlifting Marquee Venue
- Location: Manama, Bahrain
- Dates: 11 December
- Competitors: 27 from 25 nations
- Winning total: 267 kg

Medalists
gold medal	Olivia Reeves	United States
silver medal	Jong Chun-hui	North Korea
bronze medal	Yang Qiuxia	China

The women's 71 kilograms competition at the 2024 World Weightlifting Championships was held on 11 December 2024.

== Schedule ==
Date	Time	Event
11 December 2024	10:30	Group C
11 December 2024	13:00	Group B
11 December 2024	17:30	Group A

== Records ==
Prior to this competition, the existing world records were as follows.

World record	Snatch	Angie Palacios (ECU)	121 kg	Havana, Cuba	14 June 2023
World record	Clean & Jerk	Song Kuk-hyang (PRK)	154 kg	Tashkent, Uzbekistan	7 February 2024
World record	Total	Liao Guifang (CHN)	273 kg	Riyadh, Saudi Arabia	13 September 2023

== Results ==
Rank	Athlete	Group	Snatch (kg)				Clean & Jerk (kg)				Total
Rank	Athlete	Group	1	2	3	Rank	1	2	3	Rank	Total
1st place, gold medalist(s)	Olivia Reeves (USA)	A	110	115	120	2nd place, silver medalist(s)	143	~~147~~	147	1st place, gold medalist(s)	267
2nd place, silver medalist(s)	Jong Chun-hui (PRK)	A	~~115~~	~~115~~	116	3rd place, bronze medalist(s)	~~145~~	~~146~~	146	2nd place, silver medalist(s)	262
3rd place, bronze medalist(s)	Yang Qiuxia (CHN)	A	115	~~120~~	121	1st place, gold medalist(s)	134	140	~~144~~	3rd place, bronze medalist(s)	261
4	Eygló Fanndal Sturludóttir (ISL)	A	101	104	107	5	129	132	~~134~~	4	239
5	Julieth Rodríguez (COL)	A	110	~~114~~	~~115~~	4	128	~~133~~	~~133~~	10	238
6	Mari Sánchez (COL)	A	103	106	~~110~~	6	130	~~135~~	~~135~~	7	236
7	Jessica Jarquin (MEX)	B	98	102	105	7	125	130	~~133~~	6	235
8	Meredith Alwine (USA)	A	95	98	101	9	127	131	132	5	233
9	Kristel Macrohon (PHI)	A	~~102~~	102	~~106~~	8	~~129~~	129	~~132~~	8	231
10	Chen Wen-huei (TPE)	A	~~99~~	~~101~~	101	10	~~128~~	~~129~~	129	9	230
11	Olivia Selemaia (NZL)	B	96	99	~~102~~	12	116	120	123	12	222
12	Diana García (MEX)	B	93	~~96~~	96	17	123	126	~~130~~	11	222
13	Lisa Schweizer (GER)	B	100	~~103~~	~~103~~	11	115	119	~~121~~	17	219
14	Line Ravn Gude (DEN)	C	92	96	~~101~~	15	117	122	~~125~~	13	218
15	Aray Nurlybekova (KAZ)	B	93	97	~~101~~	14	~~120~~	~~120~~	120	16	217
16	Alexis Ashworth (CAN)	B	93	96	~~99~~	16	115	120	~~124~~	15	216
17	Ganzorigiin Anuujin (MGL)	C	~~92~~	92	98	13	113	117	~~122~~	19	215
18	Tatiana Salas (CRC)	C	92	95	~~99~~	18	113	117	~~120~~	18	212
19	Erin Barton (GBR)	B	~~91~~	91	~~94~~	20	~~121~~	121	~~124~~	14	212
20	Lijana Jakaitė (LTU)	C	~~90~~	~~92~~	92	19	110	~~117~~	~~117~~	21	202
21	Mabia Aktar (BAN)	C	81	86	88	21	108	112	114	20	202
22	Gina McMonagle (IRL)	C	80	83	86	22	105	109	~~112~~	22	195
23	Natália Hušťavová (SVK)	C	80	83	85	23	100	103	~~106~~	23	188
24	Zainab Yahya (BHR)	C	78	~~82~~	~~82~~	24	92	97	~~102~~	24	175
25	Lydia Nakidde (UGA)	C	70	73	75	25	90	95	~~100~~	25	170
26	Hanan Al-Ameer (KUW)	C	60	65	70	26	75	80	~~85~~	26	150
—	Charlotte Simoneau (CAN)	B	—	—	—	—	—	—	—	—	—
—	Reihaneh Karimi (IRI)	B	Did not start								
