= Weightlifting at the 2022 Commonwealth Games – Men's 67 kg =

Weightlifting – Men's 67 kg at the 2022 Commonwealth Games
- Venue: National Exhibition Centre
- Dates: 31 July 2022
- Competitors: 9 from 9 nations
- Winning total weight: 300 GR

Medalists
gold medal	Jeremy Lalrinnunga	India
silver medal	Vaipava Ioane	Samoa
bronze medal	Edidiong Joseph Umoafia	Nigeria

The men's 67 kg weightlifting event at the 2022 Commonwealth Games took place at the National Exhibition Centre on 31 July 2022. An initial list of eleven athletes were expected to compete, though Talha Talib of Pakistan was removed after he was suspended due to an anti-doping violation. At the event, nine athletes competed with Craig Carfay of Scotland not competing.

Jeremy Lalrinnunga of India won the event with a Games record of 300 kilograms. He had also set a Games record in the snatch with a weight of 140 kilograms. Vaipava Ioane of Samoa was the silver medalist with a total of 293 kilograms, setting a Games record in the clean and jerk with a weight of 166 kilograms. Edidiong Joseph Umoafia of Nigeria was the bronze medalist.

== Background ==
Weightlifting was part of the programme of the 2022 Commonwealth Games, whereas its weight categories were changed in 2018 by the International Weightlifting Federation. One of these events would be the men's 67 kg event and would be included in the Games' programme. To qualify for the event, an athlete would have to either place first at the 2021 Commonwealth Weightlifting Championships in a category included at the Games, place high enough in the IWF Commonwealth Ranking List, or be given a Bipartite Invitation from the hosts. England can automatically qualify a weightlifter as they are the hosts of the event.

The 2021 Commonwealth Champion in the event would be Jeremy Lalrinnunga of India, qualifying him for the games. The athletes that had qualified through their ranking were Talha Talib of Pakistan, Edidiong Joseph Umoafia of Nigeria, Vaipava Ioane of Samoa, Chaturanga Lakmal of Sri Lanka, Craig Carfay of Scotland, Ruben Katoatau of Kiribati, Kester Loy of Singapore, and Ditto Ika of Nauru. Jaswant Shergill was the host's pick to represent England, while Marc Jonathan Coret of Mauritius was awarded the Bipartite Invitation. Later on, Talib would be removed from the list following his suspension for failing an anti-doping test.

=== List of initial qualified athletes ===
List of athletes
Means of qualification	Quotas	Qualified
Host Nation	1	Jaswant Shergill (ENG)
2021 Commonwealth Championships	1	Jeremy Lalrinnunga (IND)
IWF Commonwealth Rankings	7	~~Talha Talib (PAK)~~; Edidiong Joseph Umoafia (NGR); Vaipava Ioane (SAM); Chaturanga Lakmal (SRI); Craig Carfray (SCO); Ruben Katoatau (KIR); Kester Loy (SGP); Ditto Ika (NRU)
Bipartite Invitation	1	Marc Jonathan Coret (MRI)
Total	10	

== Records ==
Records before the competition
World record	Snatch	Huang Minhao (CHN)	155 kg	Tokyo, Japan	6 July 2019
World record	Clean & Jerk	Pak Jong-ju (PRK)	188 kg	Pattaya, Thailand	20 November 2019
World record	Total	Chen Lijun (CHN)	339 kg	Ningbo, China	21 April 2019
Commonwealth record	Snatch	Talha Talib (PAK)	150 kg	Tokyo, Japan	25 July 2021
Commonwealth record	Clean & Jerk	Talha Talib (PAK)	170 kg	Tokyo, Japan	25 July 2021
Commonwealth record	Total	Talha Talib (PAK)	320 kg	Tokyo, Japan	25 July 2021
Games record	Snatch	Commonwealth Games Standard	131 kg		
Games record	Clean & Jerk	Commonwealth Games Standard	162 kg		
Games record	Total	Commonwealth Games Standard	289 kg		

Records set at the competition
Snatch	140 kg	Jeremy Lalrinnunga (IND)	GR
Clean and jerk	166 kg	Vaipava Ioane (SAM)	GR
Total	300 kg	Jeremy Lalrinnunga (IND)	GR

== Schedule ==
All times are British Summer Time (UTC+1)

Date	Time	Round
Sunday 31 July 2022	9:30	Final

== Results ==
The event was held on 31 July 2022 at the National Exhibition Centre. Carfay would not compete at the Games, leaving the total amount of athletes in the event to nine.

Results summary
Rank	Athlete	Body weight (kg)	Snatch (kg)				Clean & Jerk (kg)				Total
Rank	Athlete	Body weight (kg)	1	2	3	Result	1	2	3	Result	Total
1st place, gold medalist(s)	Jeremy Lalrinnunga (IND)	66.36	136	140	~~143~~	140 GR	154	160	~~165~~	160	300 GR
2nd place, silver medalist(s)	Vaipava Ioane (SAM)	66.32	124	127	~~129~~	127	163	166	~~174~~	166 GR	293
3rd place, bronze medalist(s)	Edidiong Joseph Umoafia (NGR)	66.86	~~130~~	~~130~~	130	130	150	~~160~~	160	160	290
4	Jaswant Shergill (ENG)	66.68	110	114	~~117~~	114	140	146	~~150~~	146	260
5	Chaturanga Lakmal (SRI)	64.57	112	116	119	119	~~140~~	140	~~144~~	140	259
6	Ruben Katoatau (KIR)	66.97	106	110	114	114	136	140	144	144	258
7	Ditto Ika (NRU)	66.79	~~105~~	105	~~108~~	105	135	140	~~145~~	140	245
8	Marc Jonathan Coret (MRI)	66.16	100	105	~~107~~	105	136	~~140~~	~~140~~	136	241
9	Kester Loy (SGP)	66.41	~~105~~	106	109	109	128	~~134~~	~~135~~	128	237
