= 2021 World Weightlifting Championships – Women's 71 kg =

Weightlifting Championship

The women's 71 kilograms competition at the 2021 World Weightlifting Championships was held on 13 December 2021.

== Schedule ==
Date	Time	Event
13 December 2021	08:30	Group C
13 December 2021	13:00	Group B
13 December 2021	19:00	Group A

== Medalists ==
Event	Gold		Silver		Bronze	
Snatch	Evgeniia Guseva (RWF)	104 kg	Olivia Reeves (USA)	104 kg	Patricia Strenius (SWE)	104 kg
Clean & Jerk	Meredith Alwine (USA)	135 kg	Sarah Davies (GBR)	132 kg	Joy Ogbonne Eze (NGR)	130 kg
Total	Meredith Alwine (USA)	235 kg	Sarah Davies (GBR)	234 kg	Patricia Strenius (SWE)	231 kg

== Records ==
Prior to this competition, the existing world records were as follows.

World Record	Snatch	World Standard	117 kg	—	1 November 2018
World Record	Clean & Jerk	Zhang Wangli (CHN)	152 kg	Ashgabat, Turkmenistan	6 November 2018
World Record	Total	Zhang Wangli (CHN)	267 kg	Ashgabat, Turkmenistan	6 November 2018

== Results ==
Rank	Athlete	Group	Snatch (kg)				Clean & Jerk (kg)				Total
Rank	Athlete	Group	1	2	3	Rank	1	2	3	Rank	Total
1st place, gold medalist(s)	Meredith Alwine (USA)	A	100	~~102~~	~~103~~	10	132	135	~~138~~	1st place, gold medalist(s)	235
2nd place, silver medalist(s)	Sarah Davies (GBR)	A	96	99	102	7	126	129	132	2nd place, silver medalist(s)	234
3rd place, bronze medalist(s)	Patricia Strenius (SWE)	A	98	101	104	3rd place, bronze medalist(s)	127	~~130~~	~~130~~	5	231
4	Olivia Reeves (USA)	A	101	104	~~106~~	2nd place, silver medalist(s)	~~127~~	127	~~130~~	6	231
5	Vanessa Sarno (PHI)	A	95	101	103	5	128	~~131~~	~~131~~	4	231
6	Joy Ogbonne Eze (NGR)	B	95	100	~~104~~	9	118	127	130	3rd place, bronze medalist(s)	230
7	Kristel Macrohon (PHI)	A	95	100	103	4	125	~~130~~	~~130~~	8	228
8	Kumushkhon Fayzullaeva (UZB)	A	99	102	~~105~~	6	126	~~130~~	~~131~~	7	228
9	Gülnabat Kadyrowa (TKM)	A	101	~~104~~	~~105~~	8	120	~~124~~	124	9	225
10	Evgeniia Guseva (RWF)	A	100	104	~~106~~	1st place, gold medalist(s)	120	~~126~~	~~127~~	11	224
11	Siriyakorn Khaipandung (THA)	A	95	~~98~~	98	11	118	~~121~~	~~122~~	14	216
12	Harjinder Kaur (IND)	A	~~90~~	~~90~~	90	18	115	119	121	10	211
13	Lalchhanhimi (IND)	B	87	90	~~92~~	16	115	119	~~122~~	12	209
14	Manon Angonese (BEL)	B	87	90	92	15	110	114	~~117~~	18	206
15	Shania Bedward (CAN)	B	~~88~~	88	92	14	108	112	~~117~~	19	204
16	Daniela Ivanova (LAT)	B	85	~~88~~	88	20	110	114	116	16	204
17	Nadia Burke (CAN)	C	84	~~87~~	87	21	108	112	116	15	203
18	Lijana Jakaitė (LTU)	B	~~89~~	89	~~91~~	19	110	114	~~116~~	17	203
19	Ebony Gorincu (AUS)	B	~~85~~	85	~~90~~	23	110	115	118	13	203
20	Eygló Fanndal Sturludóttir (ISL)	C	84	88	92	13	104	108	110	21	202
21	Natalia Prișcepa (MDA)	B	91	94	~~96~~	12	108	~~112~~	~~112~~	22	202
22	Line Gude (DEN)	B	88	90	~~93~~	17	~~111~~	112	~~115~~	20	202
23	Darcy Kay (AUS)	C	~~80~~	80	85	22	105	~~111~~	~~111~~	23	190
24	Roberta Tabone (MLT)	C	79	82	~~85~~	24	102	~~106~~	~~106~~	24	184
25	D. T. Gurugama (SRI)	C	65	70	74	25	85	91	94	25	168
—	Ilia Hernández (ESP)	B	~~88~~	~~88~~	~~88~~	—	—	—	—	—	—
