= 2011 African Weightlifting Championships =

International weightlifting competition

These are the results of the 2011 African Weightlifting Championships. The event was held jointly with the 2011 Commonwealth Championships.

== 56 kg Men ==
Rank	Name	Born	Nation	B.weight	Group	Snatch	CI&Jerk	Total
1	PHILLIPS Anrich Morico	17.10.1992	RSA	54.32	A	95	115	210
2	CONFIANCE Rick Yves	24.05.1994	SEY	55.34	A	75	90	165

== 62 kg Men ==
Rank	Name	Born	Nation	B.weight	Group	Snatch	CI&Jerk	Total
1	PHILLIPS Luwellyne Andrew	21.08.1989	RSA	59.18	A	100	120	220

== 69 kg Men ==
Rank	Name	Born	Nation	B.weight	Group	Snatch	CI&Jerk	Total
1	DU PLOOY Lyle William Henry	02.08.1988	RSA	68.82	A	112	138	250
2	NGWELE Mninikhaya	12.10.1992	RSA	67.48	A	110	136	246
3	ROSE Ian Nigel	21.09.1981	SEY	67.64	B	105	130	235

== 77 kg Men ==
Rank	Name	Born	Nation	B.weight	Group	Snatch	CI&Jerk	Total
1	EKPO Felix	10.09.1981	NGR	76.72	A	141	170	311
2	SIMEON Charles Albert	16.06.1982	SEY	76.64	A	110	145	255
3	MABUYA Khati	02.07.1988	RSA	72.06	A	110	140	250

== 85 kg Men ==
Rank	Name	Born	Nation	B.weight	Group	Snatch	CI&Jerk	Total
1	ANTHONY Sean Marc	05.04.1991	RSA	80.30	A	115	150	265
2	FARABEAU Sirous	16.02.1996	SEY	82.94	A	82	105	187

== 94 kg Men ==
Rank	Name	Born	Nation	B.weight	Group	Snatch	CI&Jerk	Total
1	ULOKO Benedict	19.03.1984	NGR	92.15	A	151	193	344
2	GREEFF Jean	17.04.1990	RSA	93.05	A	135	160	295

== 105 kg Men ==
Rank	Name	Born	Nation	B.weight	Group	Snatch	CI&Jerk	Total
1	JEANNE Elvis Wilson	01.10.1975	SEY	100.95	A	127	150	277

== 48 kg Women ==
Rank	Name	Born	Nation	B.weight	Group	Snatch	CI&Jerk	Total
1	NWAOKOLO Augustina Nkem	12.12.1992	NGR	47.00	A	77	95	172
2	THELEMAQUE Katsia	28.02.1989	SEY	47.44	A	65	79	144
3	HIABATHE Tembile	28.09.1994	RSA	45.40	A	41	53	94

== 53 kg Women ==
Rank	Name	Born	Nation	B.weight	Group	Snatch	CI&Jerk	Total
1	VRIES Portia Charmaine	21.07.1984	RSA	50.24	A	65	90	155

== 58 kg Women ==
Rank	Name	Born	Nation	B.weight	Group	Snatch	CI&Jerk	Total
1	AZIKE Onyeka	01.07.1990	NGR	55.68	A	80	107	187
2	MALVINA Juliette Ruby Rita	22.05.1984	SEY	56.80	A	70	93	163
3	MJEZU Zayanda	21.08.1992	RSA	57.74	A	70	91	161
4	GOLIATH Amigene	04.11.1996	RSA	57.70	A	55	70	125

== 63 kg Women ==
Rank	Name	Born	Nation	B.weight	Group	Snatch	CI&Jerk	Total
1	OKOLI Obioma Agatha	03.07.1992	NGR	62.74	A	90	127	217
2	MASIU Matshidiso Hazel	06.05.1992	RSA	62.74	A	68	85	153
3	AGRICOLE Rena Sheryline Ranny M.	20.04.1995	SEY	62.04	A	60	65	125

== 69 kg Women ==
Rank	Name	Born	Nation	B.weight	Group	Snatch	CI&Jerk	Total
1	GEORGES Janet Marie	05.01.1979	SEY	68.75	A	96	110	206
2	PRETORIUS Mona	12.08.1988	RSA	65.45	A	77	103	180
3	RAMAROU Tlalane Joyce	19.09.1994	RSA	66.85	A	68	90	158

== +75 kg Women ==
Rank	Name	Born	Nation	B.weight	Group	Snatch	CI&Jerk	Total
1	USMAN Maryam	09.11.1990	NGR	123.70	A	117	150	267
