= Joy Ogbonne Eze =

Nigerian weightlifter (born 2004)

Personal information
- Born: 6 June 2004 (age 22)

Sport
- Country: Nigeria
- Sport: Weightlifting
- Weight class: 64 kg; 71 kg
Medal record
Women's weightlifting
Representing Nigeria
African Games
Gold medal – first place	2019 Rabat	64 kg
Gold medal – first place	2023 Accra	71 kg
African Championships
Gold medal – first place	2021 Nairobi	64 kg
Gold medal – first place	2024 Ismailia	71 kg
Silver medal – second place	2023 Tunis	71 kg
Commonwealth Championships
Gold medal – first place	2021 Tashkent	71 kg

Joy Ogbonne Eze (born 6 June 2004) is a Nigerian weightlifter. She is a two-time gold medalist at the African Games. She also won the gold medal in the women's 64 kg event at the 2021 African Weightlifting Championships in Nairobi, Kenya. She represented Nigeria at the 2024 Summer Olympics in Paris, France.

== Career ==
She represented Nigeria at the 2019 African Games held in Rabat, Morocco and she won the gold medal in the women's 64 kg event. She also won the gold medal in her event at the 2021 African Weightlifting Championships held in Nairobi, Kenya.

She won the bronze medal in the clean & jerk event in the women's 71 kg event at the 2021 World Weightlifting Championships held in Tashkent, Uzbekistan. She finished in 6th place in this competition. She also set new youth records in the clean & jerk and in total. The 2021 Commonwealth Weightlifting Championships were also held at the same time and her total result gave her the gold medal in this event. As a result, she qualified to compete at the 2022 Commonwealth Games in Birmingham, England.

She competed in the women's 71 kg event at the 2022 Commonwealth Games where she lifted 100 kg in the Snatch. She did not register a result in the Clean & Jerk.

She won the gold medal in the women's 71 kg event at the 2023 African Games held in Accra, Ghana. In 2024, she competed in the women's 71 kg event at the Summer Olympics held in Paris, France. She lifted 232 kg in total and placed seventh.

== Achievements ==
Year	Venue	Weight	Snatch (kg)				Clean & Jerk (kg)				Total	Rank
Year	Venue	Weight	1	2	3	Rank	1	2	3	Rank	Total	Rank
Olympic Games
2024	Paris, France	71 kg	95	101	~~105~~	—N/a	120	127	131	—N/a	232	7
World Championships
2021	Tashkent, Uzbekistan	71 kg	95	100	~~104~~	9	118	127	130	3rd place, bronze medalist(s)	230	6
2023	Riyadh, Saudi Arabia	71 kg	~~100~~	100	~~105~~	17	122	127	~~132~~	15	227	14
IWF World Cup
2024	Phuket, Thailand	71 kg	~~103~~	103	~~106~~	16	131	136	~~138~~	5	239	8
African Games
2019	Rabat, Morocco	64 kg	~~95~~	95	97	1st place, gold medalist(s)	111	116	121	1st place, gold medalist(s)	218	1st place, gold medalist(s)
2024	Accra, Ghana	71 kg	90	~~95~~	—	1st place, gold medalist(s)	117	—	—	1st place, gold medalist(s)	207	1st place, gold medalist(s)
African Championships
2021	Nairobi, Kenya	64 kg	88	~~92~~	—	1st place, gold medalist(s)	100	~~110~~	110	1st place, gold medalist(s)	198	1st place, gold medalist(s)
2023	Tunis, Tunisia	71 kg	97	102	~~105~~	2nd place, silver medalist(s)	~~120~~	120	125	2nd place, silver medalist(s)	227	2nd place, silver medalist(s)
2024	Ismailia, Egypt	71 kg	100	~~104~~	104	1st place, gold medalist(s)	130	~~135~~	~~135~~	1st place, gold medalist(s)	234	1st place, gold medalist(s)
Commonwealth Games
2022	Birmingham, England	71 kg	95	100	~~103~~	—N/a	~~125~~	~~125~~	~~125~~	—N/a	DNF	—
Commonwealth Championships
2021	Tashkent, Uzbekistan	71 kg	95	100	~~104~~	—N/a	118	127	130	—N/a	230	1st place, gold medalist(s)
