= Olivia Reeves =

American weightlifter (born 2003)

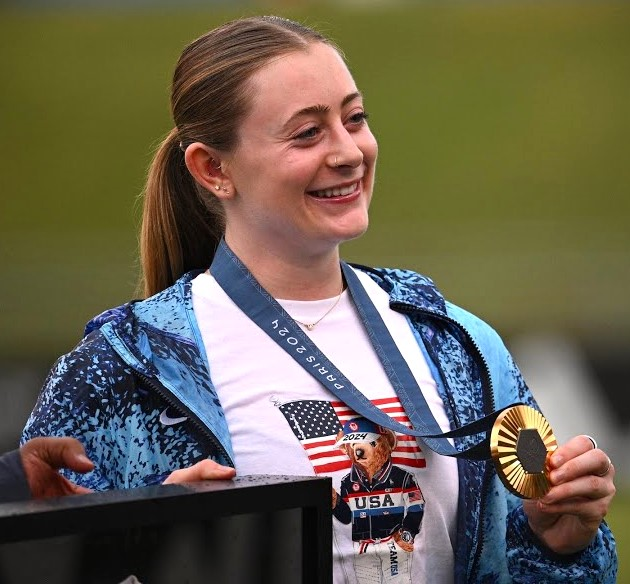
- Reeves displays her Olympic gold medal in 2024.

Personal information
- Full name: Olivia Lynn Reeves
- Born: April 19, 2003 (age 23) Chattanooga, Tennessee, U.S.

Sport
- Country: United States
- Sport: Weightlifting
- Weight class: 71 kg
- Club: UTC Weightlifting Club
- Coached by: Steve Fauer
Medal record
Women's weightlifting
Representing United States
Olympic Games
Gold medal – first place	2024 Paris	71 kg
World Championships
Gold medal – first place	2024 Manama	71 kg
Gold medal – first place	2025 Førde	77 kg
Bronze medal – third place	2023 Riyadh	71 kg
IWF World Cup
Gold medal – first place	2024 Phuket	71 kg
Pan American Games
Gold medal – first place	2023 Santiago	81 kg
Pan American Championships
Gold medal – first place	2025 Cali	69 kg
Gold medal – first place	2026 Panama City	69 kg
Bronze medal – third place	2023 Bariloche	71 kg
Junior World Championships
Gold medal – first place	2021 Tashkent	71 kg
Silver medal – second place	2022 Heraklion	71 kg
Youth World Championships
Silver medal – second place	2019 Las Vegas	71 kg
Junior Pan American Games
Gold medal – first place	2021 Cali-Valle	76 kg

Olivia Lynn Reeves (born April 19, 2003) is an American weightlifter. She won the gold medal in the women's 71 kg event at the 2024 Summer Olympics in Paris, France. In 2023, she won the bronze medal in her event at the World Weightlifting Championships held in Riyadh, Saudi Arabia. In 2024, she won the gold medal in that event with a total of 267 kg. She became the first U.S. lifter in 66 years to hold both the world title and an Olympic gold in the same year. She won the gold medal in the women's 81 kg event at the 2023 Pan American Games held in Santiago, Chile.

== Career ==
Reeves won the gold medal in the women's 71 kg event at the 2021 Junior World Weightlifting Championships held in Tashkent, Uzbekistan. She also won the gold medal in the women's 76 kg event at the 2021 Junior Pan American Games held in Cali and Valle, Colombia. Reeves won the silver medal in the snatch event in the women's 71 kg event at the 2021 World Weightlifting Championships held in Tashkent, Uzbekistan.

Reeves won the bronze medal in the women's 71 kg clean & jerk event at the 2022 World Weightlifting Championships held in Bogotá, Colombia.

In 2023, she won the bronze medal in her event at the Pan American Weightlifting Championships held in Bariloche, Argentina. Reeves also won bronze in the snatch and gold in the clean & jerk. In the same year, she won the bronze medal in the women's 71 kg event at the World Weightlifting Championships held in Riyadh, Saudi Arabia. She also set new junior world records in the clean & jerk and total.

In October 2023, Reeves won the gold medal in the women's 81 kg event at the Pan American Games held in Santiago, Chile. She set new junior Americas records in the snatch, clean & jerk and total. Her best lifts were 114 kg in the snatch and 144 kg in the clean & jerk, and a result of 258 kg in total. At the 2024 IWF World Cup, she won the gold medal in the snatch (118 kg), clean & jerk (150 kg) and total (268 kg) in the women's 71 kg event.

Reeves won gold in the 71 kg category at the 2024 Summer Olympics in Paris, France. It was the United States' first Olympic gold medal in weightlifting since 2000. She also won the gold medal in her event at the 2024 World Weightlifting Championships held in Bahrain.

== Achievements ==
Year	Venue	Weight	Snatch (kg)				Clean & jerk (kg)				Total	Rank
Year	Venue	Weight	1	2	3	Rank	1	2	3	Rank	Total	Rank
Olympic Games
2024	Paris, France	71 kg	112	115	117 OR	—N/a	140	145	~~150~~	—N/a	262	1st place, gold medalist(s)
World Championships
2021	Tashkent, Uzbekistan	71 kg	101	104	~~106~~	2nd place, silver medalist(s)	~~127~~	127	~~130~~	6	231	4
2022	Bogotá, Colombia	71 kg	~~103~~	103	106	9	132	136	139	3rd place, bronze medalist(s)	245	5
2023	Riyadh, Saudi Arabia	71 kg	105	108	111	3rd place, bronze medalist(s)	133	138	142	2nd place, silver medalist(s)	253	3rd place, bronze medalist(s)
2024	Manama, Bahrain	71 kg	110	115	120	2nd place, silver medalist(s)	143	~~147~~	147	1st place, gold medalist(s)	267	1st place, gold medalist(s)
2025	Førde, Norway	77 kg	114	119	123 CWR	1st place, gold medalist(s)	~~146~~	146	155 CWR	1st place, gold medalist(s)	278CWR	1st place, gold medalist(s)
IWF World Cup
2024	Phuket, Thailand	71 kg	112	115	118	1st place, gold medalist(s)	142	147	150	1st place, gold medalist(s)	268	1st place, gold medalist(s)
Pan American Games
2023	Santiago, Chile	81 kg	106	111	114	1st place, gold medalist(s)	136	140	144	1st place, gold medalist(s)	258	1st place, gold medalist(s)
Pan American Championships
2023	Bariloche, Argentina	71 kg	104	~~107~~	108	3rd place, bronze medalist(s)	134	~~138~~	139	1st place, gold medalist(s)	247	3rd place, bronze medalist(s)
2025	Cali, Colombia	69 kg	113	117	119	1st place, gold medalist(s)	141	146	149	1st place, gold medalist(s)	268	1st place, gold medalist(s)
