= Weightlifting at the 2024 Summer Olympics – Women's 71 kg =

Women's 71 kg at the Games of the XXXIII Olympiad
- Venue: Paris Expo Porte de Versailles
- Date: 9 August 2024
- Competitors: 12 from 12 nations
- Winning total: 262 kg

Medalists
1st place, gold medalist(s)		Olivia Reeves	United States
2nd place, silver medalist(s)		Mari Sánchez	Colombia
3rd place, bronze medalist(s)		Angie Palacios	Ecuador

The Women's 71 kg weightlifting competitions at the 2024 Summer Olympics in Paris took place on 9 August at the Paris Expo Porte de Versailles.

Olivia Reeves won the United States' first gold medal in weightlifting since 2000.

== Records ==
Records before the competition
World Record	Snatch	Angie Palacios (ECU)	121 kg	Havana, Cuba	14 June 2023
World Record	Clean & Jerk	Song Kuk-hyang (PRK)	154 kg	Tashkent, Uzbekistan	7 February 2024
World Record	Total	Liao Guifang (CHN)	273 kg	Riyadh, Saudi Arabia	13 September 2023
Olympic Record	Snatch	Olympic Standard	115 kg	—	
Olympic Record	Clean & Jerk	Olympic Standard	148 kg	—	
Olympic Record	Total	Olympic Standard	265 kg	—	

The following records were established during the competition:

Category	Athlete	New record	Type
Snatch	Angie Palacios (ECU)	116 kg	OR
Snatch	Olivia Reeves (USA)	117 kg	OR

== Results ==
Rank	Athlete	Nation	Snatch (kg)				Clean & Jerk (kg)				Total
Rank	Athlete	Nation	1	2	3	Result	1	2	3	Result	Total
1st place, gold medalist(s)	Olivia Reeves	United States	112	115	117	117 OR	140	145	~~150~~	145	262
2nd place, silver medalist(s)	Mari Sánchez	Colombia	108	~~112~~	112	112	135	140	145	145	257
3rd place, bronze medalist(s)	Angie Palacios	Ecuador	110	114	116	116	135	138	140	140	256
4	Siuzanna Valodzka	Individual Neutral Athletes	108	111	~~113~~	111	135	~~140~~	~~142~~	135	246
5	Marie Fegue	France	~~110~~	110	~~114~~	110	~~132~~	133	~~138~~	133	243
6	Chen Wen-huei	Chinese Taipei	~~102~~	103	~~106~~	103	133	~~139~~	~~140~~	133	236
7	Joy Ogbonne Eze	Nigeria	95	101	~~105~~	101	120	127	131	131	232
8	Amanda Schott	Brazil	100	104	106	106	~~117~~	123	~~131~~	123	229
9	Neama Said	Egypt	97	~~101~~	~~102~~	97	120	125	—	125	222
10	Jacqueline Nichele	Australia	90	94	~~98~~	94	115	~~120~~	~~120~~	115	209
—	Loredana Toma	Romania	111	115	~~117~~	115	~~131~~	~~133~~	~~134~~	—	DNF
—	Vanessa Sarno	Philippines	~~100~~	~~100~~	~~100~~	—	—	—	—	—	DNF
