= 2018 World Weightlifting Championships – Women's 71 kg =

The women's 71 kilograms competition at the 2018 World Weightlifting Championships was held on 6 November 2018.

== Schedule ==
Date	Time	Event
6 November 2018	08:00	Group C
6 November 2018	12:00	Group B
6 November 2018	17:25	Group A

== Medalists ==
Event	Gold		Silver		Bronze	
Snatch	Zhang Wangli (CHN)	115 kg	Nadezda Likhacheva (KAZ)	112 kg	Sara Ahmed (EGY)	111 kg
Clean & Jerk	Zhang Wangli (CHN)	152 kg	Sara Ahmed (EGY)	141 kg	Mattie Rogers (USA)	133 kg
Total	Zhang Wangli (CHN)	267 kg	Sara Ahmed (EGY)	252 kg	Nadezda Likhacheva (KAZ)	242 kg

== Records ==
Prior to this competition, the existing world records were as follows.

World Record	Snatch	World Standard	117 kg	—	1 November 2018
World Record	Clean & Jerk	World Standard	147 kg	—	1 November 2018
World Record	Total	World Standard	261 kg	—	1 November 2018

== Results ==
Rank	Athlete	Group	Snatch (kg)				Clean & Jerk (kg)				Total
Rank	Athlete	Group	1	2	3	Rank	1	2	3	Rank	Total
1st place, gold medalist(s)	Zhang Wangli (CHN)	A	108	113	115	1st place, gold medalist(s)	140	148	152	1st place, gold medalist(s)	267
2nd place, silver medalist(s)	Sara Ahmed (EGY)	A	105	~~110~~	111	3rd place, bronze medalist(s)	136	141	—	2nd place, silver medalist(s)	252
3rd place, bronze medalist(s)	Nadezda Likhacheva (KAZ)	A	105	110	112	2nd place, silver medalist(s)	~~130~~	130	~~136~~	7	242
4	Anastasia Romanova (RUS)	A	105	110	~~113~~	4	125	130	~~133~~	6	240
5	Mattie Rogers (USA)	A	100	103	105	5	130	133	~~137~~	3rd place, bronze medalist(s)	238
6	Meredith Alwine (USA)	A	~~98~~	98	101	7	128	132	~~135~~	4	233
7	Mari Sánchez (COL)	A	103	~~106~~	~~107~~	6	120	~~125~~	125	8	228
8	Jennifer Cantú (MEX)	A	92	~~98~~	~~98~~	13	~~124~~	~~124~~	124	9	216
9	Charlotte Åkerlund (SWE)	B	94	97	~~100~~	8	113	116	118	11	215
10	Yekaterina Stolyarenko (KAZ)	B	90	94	~~96~~	10	115	118	~~122~~	10	212
11	Gülnabat Kadyrowa (TKM)	B	94	96	~~98~~	9	112	~~115~~	115	16	211
12	Kim Su-hyeon (KOR)	B	90	93	~~96~~	11	~~115~~	116	~~123~~	13	209
13	Liu Lan-yin (TPE)	B	90	93	~~95~~	12	110	~~115~~	115	15	208
14	Eri Mitsuke (JPN)	B	~~90~~	90	~~93~~	15	113	115	117	12	207
15	Kristel Macrohon (PHI)	B	~~85~~	85	90	16	110	115	~~120~~	14	205
16	Berfin Altun (TUR)	C	~~85~~	87	~~90~~	21	109	114	~~119~~	17	201
17	Eleni Kourtelidou (GRE)	C	85	~~88~~	88	19	105	108	111	18	199
18	Jolanta Wiór (POL)	B	90	~~93~~	~~93~~	14	108	~~112~~	~~113~~	20	198
19	Liana Gyurjyan (ARM)	B	~~85~~	85	~~90~~	22	105	~~110~~	110	19	195
20	Anastasiya Mikhalenka (BLR)	C	83	87	~~89~~	20	107	~~113~~	~~115~~	21	194
21	Otgonbayaryn Darkhijav (MGL)	C	82	86	89	17	100	~~103~~	~~104~~	22	189
22	Simona Hertlová (CZE)	C	85	88	~~90~~	18	100	~~104~~	~~104~~	23	188
23	Marina Ohman (ISR)	C	~~83~~	83	~~86~~	24	95	99	~~102~~	24	182
24	Sara Sigmundsdóttir (ISL)	C	80	84	~~87~~	23	95	~~100~~	~~102~~	26	179
25	Alessia Wälchli (SUI)	C	~~78~~	78	~~82~~	26	~~98~~	~~98~~	98	25	176
26	Mette Pedersen (DEN)	C	~~79~~	~~79~~	80	25	~~94~~	95	~~99~~	27	175
—	Patricia Strenius (SWE)	A	~~97~~	~~97~~	~~97~~	—	125	128	131	5	—

== New records ==
Clean & Jerk	148 kg	Zhang Wangli (CHN)	WR
Clean & Jerk	152 kg	Zhang Wangli (CHN)	WR
Total	263 kg	Zhang Wangli (CHN)	WR
Total	267 kg	Zhang Wangli (CHN)	WR
