= Nadezda Likhacheva =

Kazakhstani weightlifter (born 1995)

Personal information
- Nationality: Kazakhstani
- Born: 18 August 1995 (age 31)
- Weight: 68.40 kg (151 lb)

Sport
- Country: Kazakhstan
- Sport: Weightlifting
- Event: –71 kg
Medal record
World Championships
Bronze medal – third place	2018 Ashgabat	–71 kg

Nadezda Likhacheva (born 18 August 1995) is a Kazakhstani weightlifter.

She won a bronze medal at the 2018 World Weightlifting Championships.
