= Weightlifting at the 2023 Pan American Games – Women's 71 kg =

Weightlifting – Women's 71kg at the 2023 Pan American Games
- Venue: Gimnasio Chimkowe
- Dates: 22 October
- Competitors: 17 from 16 nations

Medalists
Gold medal	Angie Palacios	Ecuador
Silver medal	Mari Sánchez	Colombia
Bronze medal	Meredith Alwine	United States

The women's 71 kg competition of the weightlifting events at the 2023 Pan American Games in Santiago, Chile, was held on 22 October at the Gimnasio Chimkowe.

Each lifter performed in both the snatch and clean and jerk lifts, with the final score being the sum of the lifter's best result in each. The athlete received three attempts in each of the two lifts; the score for the lift was the heaviest weight successfully lifted. This weightlifting event was limited to competitors with a maximum of 71 kilograms of body mass.

== Results ==
The results were as follows:

Rank	Athlete	Nation	Group	Snatch (kg)				Clean & Jerk (kg)				Total
Rank	Athlete	Nation	Group	1	2	3	Result	1	2	3	Result	Total
1st place, gold medalist(s)	Angie Palacios	Ecuador	A	110	115	118	118	130	135	–	135	253
2nd place, silver medalist(s)	Mari Sánchez	Colombia	A	105	109	112	112	130	134	~~137~~	134	246
3rd place, bronze medalist(s)	Meredith Alwine	United States	A	~~100~~	100	103	103	131	136	~~140~~	136	239
4	Yeniuska Feria	Cuba	A	100	105	108	108	125	130	~~133~~	130	238
5	Jessica Jarquín	Mexico	A	97	101	104	104	122	126	~~131~~	126	230
6	Daiana Serrano	Dominican Republic	A	96	100	103	103	121	~~126~~	~~126~~	121	224
7	Julieth Rodríguez	Colombia	A	98	~~102~~	~~102~~	98	115	~~120~~	120	120	218
8	Tatiana Ullua	Argentina	A	~~92~~	92	~~96~~	92	112	116	~~118~~	116	208
9	Tatiana Salas	Costa Rica	A	87	92	~~96~~	92	~~107~~	107	~~112~~	107	199
10	Eldi Paredes	Peru	A	84	~~87~~	87	87	107	~~111~~	111	111	198
11	Karina Torres	Chile	A	80	84	86	86	103	107	110	110	196
12	Sema Ludrick	Nicaragua	A	80	~~85~~	~~85~~	80	~~110~~	110	~~115~~	110	190
13	Paola Marsicano	Uruguay	A	76	80	~~85~~	80	97	101	~~104~~	101	181
14	Kelly Aparicio	Panama	A	68	73	~~74~~	73	90	93	96	96	169
15	Natalia Rivero	Bolivia	A	65	68	72	72	87	93	~~96~~	93	165
16	Johanna Prieto	Paraguay	A	62	66	~~70~~	66	81	~~86~~	~~86~~	81	147
	Amanda Schott	Brazil	A	~~105~~	~~105~~	~~107~~	–					DNS
