= 2019 World Weightlifting Championships – Women's 76 kg =

The women's 76 kg competition at the 2019 World Weightlifting Championships was held on 24 September 2019.

== Schedule ==
Date	Time	Event
24 September 2019	12:00	Group B
24 September 2019	20:25	Group A

== Medalists ==
Event	Gold		Silver		Bronze	
Snatch	Rim Jong-sim (PRK)	124 kg	Zhang Wangli (CHN)	118 kg	Neisi Dájomes (ECU)	110 kg
Clean & Jerk	Zhang Wangli (CHN)	153 kg	Rim Jong-sim (PRK)	152 kg	Aremi Fuentes (MEX)	138 kg
Total	Rim Jong-sim (PRK)	276 kg	Zhang Wangli (CHN)	271 kg	Neisi Dájomes (ECU)	245 kg

== Records ==
Prior to this competition, the existing world records were as follows.

World record	Snatch	Rim Jong-sim (PRK)	123 kg	Ningbo, China	26 April 2019
World record	Clean & Jerk	Zhang Wangli (CHN)	156 kg	Fuzhou, China	26 February 2019
World record	Total	Rim Jong-sim (PRK)	278 kg	Ningbo, China	26 April 2019

== Results ==
Rank	Athlete	Group	Snatch (kg)				Clean & Jerk (kg)				Total
Rank	Athlete	Group	1	2	3	Rank	1	2	3	Rank	Total
1st place, gold medalist(s)	Rim Jong-sim (PRK)	A	120	124	~~126~~	1st place, gold medalist(s)	148	152	~~155~~	2nd place, silver medalist(s)	276
2nd place, silver medalist(s)	Zhang Wangli (CHN)	A	113	~~118~~	118	2nd place, silver medalist(s)	~~145~~	145	153	1st place, gold medalist(s)	271
3rd place, bronze medalist(s)	Neisi Dájomes (ECU)	A	110	~~115~~	~~116~~	3rd place, bronze medalist(s)	135	~~139~~	~~139~~	4	245
4	Aremi Fuentes (MEX)	A	~~107~~	107	~~111~~	5	135	138	~~140~~	3rd place, bronze medalist(s)	245
5	Iryna Dekha (UKR)	A	105	108	110	4	126	129	132	5	242
6	Kang Yeoun-hee (KOR)	B	~~104~~	~~104~~	104	7	125	131	~~135~~	6	235
7	Patricia Strenius (SWE)	A	98	102	~~105~~	9	~~129~~	~~129~~	129	8	231
8	Maria Vostrikova (RUS)	A	105	~~109~~	~~109~~	6	~~125~~	125	~~129~~	9	230
9	Kristel Ngarlem (CAN)	A	96	100	~~102~~	12	125	~~130~~	130	7	230
10	Gülnabat Kadyrowa (TKM)	A	~~99~~	~~99~~	101	11	~~120~~	120	123	10	224
11	Dzina Sazanavets (BLR)	B	95	98	101	10	115	120	~~124~~	12	221
12	Ayumi Kamiya (JPN)	A	98	102	~~104~~	8	118	~~122~~	~~122~~	15	220
13	Yao Chi-ling (TPE)	B	90	94	~~98~~	14	115	120	122	11	216
14	Meri Ilmarinen (FIN)	B	92	95	~~97~~	13	118	~~121~~	~~122~~	14	213
15	Nora Jäggi (SUI)	B	88	91	~~95~~	16	114	117	120	13	211
16	Quinnie Rwahwire (CAN)	B	88	~~92~~	92	15	~~113~~	113	115	16	207
17	Jabriella Teo (MAS)	B	82	85	~~87~~	17	105	108	~~110~~	17	193

== New records ==
Snatch	124 kg	Rim Jong-sim (PRK)	WR
