= Theodoros Iakovidis =

Greek weightlifter (born 1991)

Personal information
- Nationality: Greek
- Born: 12 February 1991 (age 35) Athens, Greece
- Height: 1.81 m (5 ft 11 in)
- Weight: 94 kg (207 lb)

Sport
- Country: Greece
- Sport: Weightlifting
Medal record
IWF World Cup
Silver medal – second place	2020 Rome	– 89 kg
Mediterranean Games
Gold medal – first place	2018 Tarragona	– 94 kg Clean & Jerk
Silver medal – second place	2018 Tarragona	– 94 kg Snatch
Bronze medal – third place	2013 Mersin	– 85 kg Clean & Jerk
Bronze medal – third place	2013 Mersin	– 85 kg Snatch

Theodoros Iakovidis (Greek: Θεόδωρος Ιακωβίδης, born 12 February 1991) is a Greek Olympian weightlifter. He competed for Greece at the 2016 Summer Olympics and 2020 Summer Olympics.

== Results ==
Year	Event	Weight	Snatch (kg)	Clean & Jerk (kg)	Total (kg)	Rank
2010	European Junior Championships	85 kg	140	172	312	8
2013	European Championships	85 kg	155	187	342	7
2013	Mediterranean Games	85 kg	156	190	346	3
2014	World Championships	85 kg	155	192	347	17
2016	European Championships	85 kg	158	187	345	6
2016	Olympic Games	85 kg	160	190	350	11
2018	European Championships	94 kg	151	187	338	7
2018	Mediterranean games	94 kg	161	195	356	1
2019	European Championships	96 kg	163	197	360	6
2019	Cup of the Blue Swords	89 kg	160	192	352	1
2019	Mediterranean Cup	89 kg	161	190	351	1
2020	World Cup	89 kg	159	195	354	2
2020	Olympic Games	96 kg	156	182	338	11
2021	European Championships	89 kg	156	191	347	8
2022	European Championships	89 kg	158	188	346	8
2023	European Championships	89 kg	158	180	338	8
