= Ruby Malvina =

Seychellois weightlifter (born 1984)

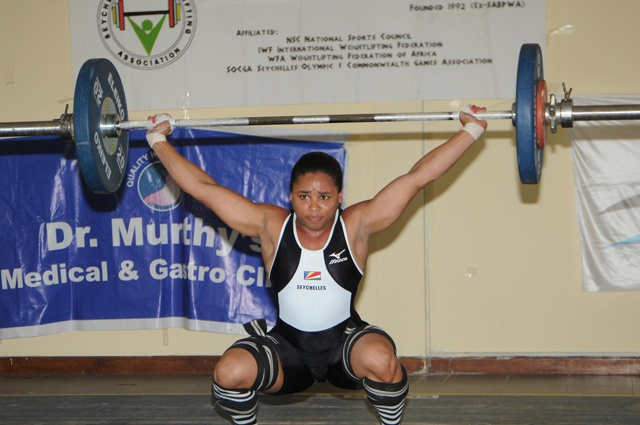
Malvina in 2015

Juliette Ruby Rita Malvina (born 1984) is a Seychellois weightlifter who has been awarded multiple medals at 2010 African Championships, 2011 African Championships, 2015 Commonwealth Weightlifting Championships, 2015 African Games and 2023 African Championships. She has also tested positive for banned substances on two occasions: the first in 2015 incurred a four year ban.

== Career ==
Malvina grew-up in a single-parent household with her father; she did not meet her mother until she was 12 years old. She was introduced to weightlifting aged 15 by Janet Thélermont. In her first international competition she was a bronze medalist in the snatch, clean and jerk and overall in the under 53 kg category at the 2010 African Championships in Yaoundé. She was a silver medalist in the snatch, clean and jerk and overall at the 2011 African Championships in Cape Town in the under 58 kg category.

In 2015, she was a awarded a gold medal at the Commonwealth Weightlifting Championships in Pune, India - but tested positive for traces of stanozolol - a dihydrotestosterone-derived synthetic anabolic steroid. She was banned for four years, and had to give up both her Commonwealth medal, and those she had won earlier in the year at the African Games and the Indian Ocean Island Games.

She was awarded three bronze medals in the under 64 kg category at the 2023 African Championships in Tunis. However after the championships, the International Testing Agency stated that Malvina tested positive for the banned anabolic steroid metenolone.
