= Jeremy Lalrinnunga =

Indian weightlifter (born 2002)

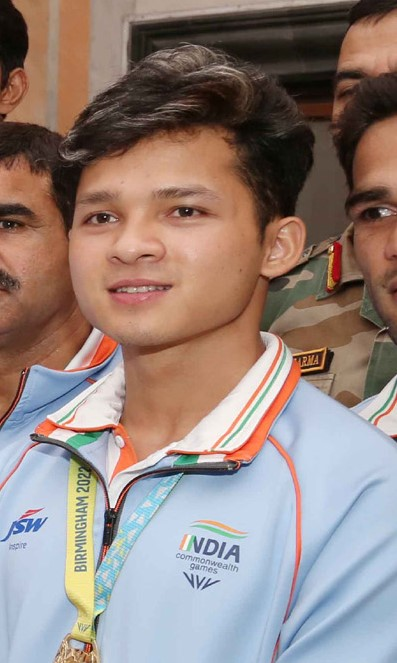
- Lalrinnunga in 2022

Personal information
- Born: 26 October 2002 (age 23) Aizawl, Mizoram, India
- Military career
- Branch: Indian Army
- Service years: 2019–present
- Rank: Subedar
- Unit: Brigade of Guards
- Awards: Vishisht Seva Medal
Medal record
Men's weightlifting
Representing India
Commonwealth Games
Gold medal – first place	2022 Birmingham	67kg
Commonwealth Championships
Gold medal – first place	2021 Tashkent	67kg
Youth Olympic Games
Gold medal – first place	2018 Buenos Aires	62kg
Youth World Championships
Silver medal – second place	2017 Bangkok	56kg

Jeremy Lalrinnunga (born 26 October 2002) is an Indian weightlifter. He made history by becoming the first Indian to win a gold medal at the Youth Olympic Games, in the boys' 62 kg event at the 2018 edition. He also won gold in the men's 67 kg event at the 2022 Commonwealth Games, where he lifted a combined total of 300 kg, setting a new Games record.

== Early life ==
Lalrinnunga was born on October 26, 2002, in Aizawl, Mizoram. In the early 1990s, his father Lalneihtluanga Ralte was well known on the Mizoram boxing circuit. Jeremy comes from a lowly background because his family circumstances prevented him for a very long time from pursuing his aspirations. His father began working as a labourer on contract with the neighbourhood Public Works Department in an effort to provide for his family.

== Results ==
Year	Venue	Weight	Snatch (kg)				Clean & Jerk (kg)				Total	Rank
Year	Venue	Weight	1	2	3	Rank	1	2	3	Rank	Total	Rank
Youth Olympic Games
2018	Buenos Aires, Argentina	62 kg	120	~~124~~	124	1	142	~~147~~	150	1	274	1st place, gold medalist(s)
Commonwealth Games
2022	Birmingham, England	67 kg	136	140 GR	~~143~~	1	154	160	~~165~~	1	300 GR	1st place, gold medalist(s)
