= Meredith Alwine =

American weightlifter (born 1998)

Personal information
- Full name: Meredith Leigh Alwine
- Born: June 8, 1998 (age 28)

Sport
- Country: United States
- Sport: Weightlifting
- Weight class: 71 kg
Medal record
Women's weightlifting
Representing United States
World Championships
Gold medal – first place	2021 Tashkent	71 kg
Pan American Games
Bronze medal – third place	2023 Santiago	71 kg
Pan American Championships
Gold medal – first place	2020 Santo Domingo	71 kg
Gold medal – first place	2021 Guayaquil	71 kg
Gold medal – first place	2023 Bariloche	76 kg
Bronze medal – third place	2022 Bogotá	71 kg
IWF World Cup
Gold medal – first place	2020 Rome	71 kg
Junior World Championships
Silver medal – second place	2018 Tashkent	75 kg

Meredith Leigh Alwine (born June 8, 1998) is an American weightlifter. She won the gold medal in the women's 71 kg event at the 2021 World Weightlifting Championships held in Tashkent, Uzbekistan. She is also a three-time gold medalist at the Pan American Weightlifting Championships.

== Career ==
In 2018, Alwine won the silver medal in the women's 75 kg event at the Junior World Weightlifting Championships held in Tashkent, Uzbekistan. In that same year, she competed in the women's 71 kg event at the World Weightlifting Championships held in Ashgabat, Turkmenistan.

In 2020, Alwine won the gold medal in the women's 71 kg event at the Roma 2020 World Cup in Rome, Italy. In 2021, she won the gold medal in her event at the Pan American Weightlifting Championships held in Guayaquil, Ecuador.

Alwine won the bronze medal in the women's 71 kg event at the 2022 Pan American Weightlifting Championships held in Bogotá, Colombia. She also won the bronze medal in the Clean & Jerk event in this competition.

Alwine won the gold medal in the women's 76 kg event at the 2023 Pan American Weightlifting Championships held in Bariloche, Argentina. She also won the gold medal in the Clean & Jerk event. In September 2023, she competed in the women's 76 kg event at the World Weightlifting Championships held in Riyadh, Saudi Arabia. She became injured during her first Clean & Jerk and she was unable to continue in the competition.

Alwine won the bronze medal in the women's 71 kg event at the 2023 Pan American Games held in Santiago, Chile.

== Achievements ==
Year	Venue	Weight	Snatch (kg)				Clean & Jerk (kg)				Total	Rank
Year	Venue	Weight	1	2	3	Rank	1	2	3	Rank	Total	Rank
World Championships
2018	Ashgabat, Turkmenistan	71 kg	~~98~~	98	101	7	128	132	~~135~~	4	233	6
2021	Tashkent, Uzbekistan	71 kg	100	~~102~~	~~103~~	10	132	135	~~138~~	1st place, gold medalist(s)	235	1st place, gold medalist(s)
2023	Riyadh, Saudi Arabia	76 kg	~~103~~	~~103~~	103	7	~~135~~	—	—	—	—	—
2024	Manama, Bahrain	71 kg	95	98	101	9	127	131	132	5	233	8
Pan American Games
2023	Santiago, Chile	71 kg	~~100~~	100	103	—N/a	131	136	~~140~~	—N/a	239	3rd place, bronze medalist(s)
Pan American Championships
2020	Santo Domingo, Dominican Republic	71 kg	~~103~~	~~103~~	103	3rd place, bronze medalist(s)	130	135	~~139~~	1st place, gold medalist(s)	238	1st place, gold medalist(s)
2021	Guayaquil, Ecuador	71 kg	100	102	104	3rd place, bronze medalist(s)	~~133~~	133	~~138~~	1st place, gold medalist(s)	237	1st place, gold medalist(s)
2022	Bogotá, Colombia	71 kg	~~102~~	~~102~~	102	4	132	~~137~~	~~137~~	3rd place, bronze medalist(s)	234	3rd place, bronze medalist(s)
2023	Bariloche, Argentina	76 kg	102	~~105~~	~~106~~	4	133	~~136~~	136	1st place, gold medalist(s)	238	1st place, gold medalist(s)
World Cup
2020	Rome, Italy	71 kg	97	100	103	1st place, gold medalist(s)	~~131~~	131	134	1st place, gold medalist(s)	237	1st place, gold medalist(s)
