= Winnifred Ntumi =

Ghanaian weightlifter (born 2002)

Personal information
- Full name: Winnifred Ntumi
- Nationality: Ghanaian
- Born: 28 September 2002 (age 23) Accra, Ghana

Sport
- Country: Ghana
- Sport: Weightlifting
- Event: Women's +45 kg
Medal record
Women's weightlifting
Representing Ghana
African Games
Gold medal – first place	2023 Accra	49 kg
Bronze medal – third place	2019 Rabat	45 kg
African Championships
Bronze medal – third place	2019 Cairo	49 kg
Bronze medal – third place	2023 Tunis	49 kg
Commonwealth Championships
Bronze medal – third place	2021 Tashkent	49 kg
- Updated on 28 March 2024

Winnifred Ntumi (born 28 September 2002) is a Ghanaian weightlifter, competing in the 45 kg category and representing Ghana at international competitions. She competed at world championships, most recently at the 2018 Africa Youth Championship, 2019 Africa Weightlifting Championship in Egypt and the 2019 Africa Games in Morocco.

== Weightlifting ==
In 2019, she won a bronze medal at the 2019 African Weightlifting Championship, competing in the 49 kg category, making her the first Ghanaian to compete and win a medal at the championship. Prior to that, she represented Ghana at the 2018 Africa Youth Championship and won a bronze medal for competing in the women's 48 kg category in Egypt.

She also competed in the 2019 Africa Games in Morocco and won three bronze medals for competing in the women's 45 kg category, making her the first Ghanaian to win a medal at the continental Weightlifting competition.

She competed in the women's 49 kg event at the 2021 World Weightlifting Championships held in Tashkent, Uzbekistan. The 2021 Commonwealth Weightlifting Championships were also held at the same time and her total result gave her the bronze medal in this event.

She finished in 9th place in the women's 49 kg event at the 2022 Commonwealth Games held in Birmingham, England.

At the 2023 African Games hosted in Accra, Ghana she competed in the women's 45 kg and 49 kg category events. She won one gold medal and claimed two silver medals, marking the first win for Ghana at the 2023 African Games.
