= 2023 African Weightlifting Championships =

Weightlifting event in Tunisia

- Host city: Tunis, Tunisia
- Events: 20 (10 men's and 10 women's)
- Dates: 14-19 May
- Main venue: La Goulette Hall

The 2023 African Weightlifting Championships was held in La Goulette, Tunis, Tunisia from 14 to 19 May 2023.

== Medal summary ==
Men

Event	Gold		Silver		Bronze	
55 kg
Snatch	Davis Niyoyita; Uganda	95 kg	Isaac Sinka; Zambia	75 kg	Not awarded, lack of entries	
Clean & Jerk	Davis Niyoyita; Uganda	120 kg	Isaac Sinka; Zambia	95 kg	Not awarded, lack of entries	
Total	Davis Niyoyita; Uganda	215 kg	Isaac Sinka; Zambia	170 kg	Not awarded, lack of entries	
61 kg
Snatch	Amine Bouhijbha; Tunisia	117 kg	Jules Andriamahefa; Madagascar	105 kg	Jelgib Elion Ndunyama; DR Congo	80 kg
Clean & Jerk	Amine Bouhijbha; Tunisia	140 kg	Jelgib Elion Ndunyama; DR Congo	92 kg	Not awarded (no registered mark)	
Total	Amine Bouhijbha; Tunisia	257 kg	Jelgib Elion Ndunyama; DR Congo	172 kg	Not awarded (no registered mark)	
67 kg
Snatch	Akram Chekhchoukh; Algeria	127 kg	Ayoub Salem; Tunisia	126 kg	Mohamed Sameer Masoud; Libya	122 kg
Clean & Jerk	Ayoub Salem; Tunisia	154 kg	Mohamed Aziz Ben Hadj; Tunisia	153 kg	Akram Chekhchoukh; Algeria	152 kg
Total	Ayoub Salem; Tunisia	280 kg	Akram Chekhchoukh; Algeria	279 kg	Mohamed Aziz Ben Hadj; Tunisia	273 kg
73 kg
Snatch	Karem Ben Hnia; Tunisia	146 kg	Edidiong Umoafia; Nigeria	142 kg	Samir Fardjallah; Algeria	141 kg
Clean & Jerk	Karem Ben Hnia; Tunisia	180 kg	Samir Fardjallah; Algeria	174 kg	Edidiong Umoafia; Nigeria	170 kg
Total	Karem Ben Hnia; Tunisia	326 kg	Samir Fardjallah; Algeria	315 kg	Edidiong Umoafia; Nigeria	312 kg
81 kg
Snatch	Ameur Messaoudi; Algeria	145 kg	Mohamed Messaour; Algeria	139 kg	Slim Bchini; Tunisia	138 kg
Clean & Jerk	Ameur Messaoudi; Algeria	170 kg	Hamza Ben Amor; Tunisia	168 kg	Slim Bchini; Tunisia	162 kg
Total	Ameur Messaoudi; Algeria	315 kg	Hamza Ben Amor; Tunisia	305 kg	Slim Bchini; Tunisia	300 kg
89 kg
Snatch	Karim Abokhala; Egypt	167 kg	Islam Aboelwafa; Egypt	161 kg	Faris Touairi; Algeria	160 kg
Clean & Jerk	Karim Abokhala; Egypt	208 kg	Faris Touairi; Algeria	192 kg	Islam Aboelwafa; Egypt	190 kg
Total	Karim Abokhala; Egypt	375 kg	Faris Touairi; Algeria	352 kg	Islam Aboelwafa; Egypt	351 kg
96 kg
Snatch	Salim Elbagor; Algeria	152 kg	Ayoub Dridi; Tunisia	135 kg	Laur Lvain Woudje Nzale; Cameroon	125 kg
Clean & Jerk	Salim Elbagor; Algeria	180 kg	Ayoub Dridi; Tunisia	176 kg	Laur Lvain Woudje Nzale; Cameroon	160 kg
Total	Salim Elbagor; Algeria	332 kg	Ayoub Dridi; Tunisia	311 kg	Laur Lvain Woudje Nzale; Cameroon	285 kg
102 kg
Snatch	Yasser Usama Hemdan; Egypt	168 kg	Aymen Touairi; Algeria	166 kg	Mohamed Abdelalim; Egypt	164 kg
Clean & Jerk	Yasser Usama Hemdan; Egypt	208 kg	Aymen Touairi; Algeria	203 kg	Mohamed Abdelalim; Egypt	200 kg
Total	Yasser Usama Hemdan; Egypt	376 kg	Aymen Touairi; Algeria	369 kg	Mohamed Abdelalim; Egypt	364 kg
109 kg
Snatch	Aymen Bacha; Tunisia	170 kg	Antony Swanepoel; South Africa	123 kg	Johannes Beukman; South Africa	120 kg
Clean & Jerk	Aymen Bacha; Tunisia	205 kg	Antony Swanepoel; South Africa	147 kg	Johannes Beukman; South Africa	145 kg
Total	Aymen Bacha; Tunisia	375 kg	Antony Swanepoel; South Africa	270 kg	Johannes Beukman; South Africa	265 kg
109+ kg
Snatch	Walid Bidani; Algeria	192 kg	Abdelrahman El-Sayed; Egypt	185 kg	Bilal Bouamr; Morocco	154 kg
Clean & Jerk	Abdelrahman El-Sayed; Egypt	243 kg AF	Bilal Bouamr; Morocco	186 kg	Maik Lahamadi Ezzedine; Tunisia	180 kg
Total	Abdelrahman El-Sayed; Egypt	428 kg	Bilal Bouamr; Morocco	340 kg	Maik Lahamadi Ezzedine; Tunisia	330 kg

Women

Event	Gold		Silver		Bronze	
45 kg
Snatch	Nadia Katbi; Algeria	51 kg	Not awarded, lack of entries			
Clean & Jerk	Nadia Katbi; Algeria	65 kg	Not awarded, lack of entries			
Total	Nadia Katbi; Algeria	116 kg	Not awarded, lack of entries			
49 kg
Snatch	Maha Fajreslam; Morocco	64 kg	Winnifred Ntumi; Ghana	58 kg	Nour Khafaoui; Tunisia	57 kg
Clean & Jerk	Nour Khafaoui; Tunisia	81 kg	Maha Fajreslam; Morocco	79 kg	Winnifred Ntumi; Ghana	71 kg
Total	Maha Fajreslam; Morocco	143 kg	Nour Khafaoui; Tunisia	138 kg	Winnifred Ntumi; Ghana	129 kg
55 kg
Snatch	Eya Aquadi; Tunisia	72 kg	Israa Bejaoui; Tunisia	71 kg	Not awarded, lack of entries	
Clean & Jerk	Eya Aquadi; Tunisia	93 kg	Israa Bejaoui; Tunisia	90 kg	Not awarded, lack of entries	
Total	Eya Aquadi; Tunisia	165 kg	Israa Bejaoui; Tunisia	161 kg	Not awarded, lack of entries	
59 kg
Snatch	Rafiatu Lawal; Nigeria	95 kg AF	Adijat Olarinoye; Nigeria	93 kg	Ghofrane Belkhir; Tunisia	92 kg
Clean & Jerk	Rafiatu Lawal; Nigeria	122 kg	Adijat Olarinoye; Nigeria	118 kg	Souhir Khmiri; Tunisia	95 kg
Total	Rafiatu Lawal; Nigeria	217 kg AF	Adijat Olarinoye; Nigeria	211 kg	Ech-Chaibia Ech-Chachouiy; Morocco	167 kg
64 kg
Snatch	Chaima Rhamouni; Tunisia	90 kg	Jawaher Gesmi; Tunisia	86 kg	Ruby Malvina; Seychelles	80 kg
Clean & Jerk	Chaima Rhamouni; Tunisia	108 kg	Jawaher Gesmi; Tunisia	107 kg	Ruby Malvina; Seychelles	107 kg
Total	Chaima Rhamouni; Tunisia	198 kg	Jawaher Gesmi; Tunisia	193 kg	Ruby Malvina; Seychelles	187 kg
71 kg
Snatch	Neama Said; Egypt	103 kg	Joy Ogbonne Eze; Nigeria	102 kg	Ketty Lent; Mauritius	89 kg
Clean & Jerk	Neama Said; Egypt	126 kg	Joy Ogbonne Eze; Nigeria	125 kg	Ketty Lent; Mauritius	108 kg
Total	Neama Said; Egypt	229 kg	Joy Ogbonne Eze; Nigeria	227 kg	Ketty Lent; Mauritius	197 kg
76 kg
Snatch	Joelita Coloma; Seychelles	85 kg	Bouchra Fatima Zohra Hirech; Algeria	81 kg	Zeineb Maghraoui; Tunisia	78 kg
Clean & Jerk	Bouchra Fatima Zohra Hirech; Algeria	103 kg	Rayssa Djifack Ma-Atemken Zomgoua; Cameroon	103 kg	Zeineb Maghraoui; Tunisia	101 kg
Total	Joelita Coloma; Seychelles	185 kg	Bouchra Fatima Zohra Hirech; Algeria	184 kg	Rayssa Djifack Ma-Atemken Zomgoua; Cameroon	180 kg
81 kg
Snatch	Sara Ahmed; Egypt	117 kg AF	Jeanne Eyenga; Cameroon	96 kg	Not awarded, lack of entries	
Clean & Jerk	Sara Ahmed; Egypt	151 kg AF	Jeanne Eyenga; Cameroon	121 kg	Not awarded, lack of entries	
Total	Sara Ahmed; Egypt	268 kg AF	Jeanne Eyenga; Cameroon	217 kg	Not awarded, lack of entries	
87 kg
Snatch	Samar Said; Egypt	105 kg	Fatma Ahmed; Egypt	97 kg	Alison Sunee; Mauritius	85 kg
Clean & Jerk	Fatma Ahmed; Egypt	125 kg	Samar Said; Egypt	124 kg	Alison Sunee; Mauritius	106 kg
Total	Samar Said; Egypt	229 kg	Fatma Ahmed; Egypt	222 kg	Alison Sunee; Mauritius	191 kg
87+ kg
Snatch	Halima Abdelazim; Egypt	115 kg	Amina Yahiamamoun; Algeria	82 kg	Estelle Momeni; Cameroon	81 kg
Clean & Jerk	Halima Abdelazim; Egypt	145 kg	Estelle Momeni; Cameroon	95 kg	Amina Yahiamamoun; Algeria	93 kg
Total	Halima Abdelazim; Egypt	260 kg	Estelle Momeni; Cameroon	176 kg	Amina Yahiamamoun; Algeria	175 kg

== Medal table ==
Ranking by Big (Total result) medals

* Host nation (Tunisia)

Rank	Nation	Gold	Silver	Bronze	Total
1	Egypt	7	1	2	10
2	Tunisia*	6	5	3	14
3	Algeria	3	5	1	9
4	Nigeria	1	2	1	4
5	Morocco	1	1	1	3
6	Seychelles	1	0	1	2
7	Uganda	1	0	0	1
8	Cameroon	0	2	2	4
9	South Africa	0	1	1	2
10	DR Congo	0	1	0	1
10	Zambia	0	1	0	1
12	Mauritius	0	0	2	2
13	Ghana	0	0	1	1
Totals (13 entries)		20	19	15	54

Ranking by all medals: Big (Total result) and Small (Snatch and Clean & Jerk)

* Host nation (Tunisia)

Rank	Nation	Gold	Silver	Bronze	Total
1	Egypt	20	5	5	30
2	Tunisia*	18	14	11	43
3	Algeria	12	12	5	29
4	Nigeria	3	7	2	12
5	Uganda	3	0	0	3
6	Morocco	2	3	2	7
7	Seychelles	2	0	3	5
8	Cameroon	0	6	5	11
9	South Africa	0	3	3	6
10	Zambia	0	3	0	3
11	DR Congo	0	2	1	3
12	Ghana	0	1	2	3
13	Madagascar	0	1	0	1
14	Mauritius	0	0	6	6
15	Libya	0	0	1	1
Totals (15 entries)		60	57	46	163

== Team ranking ==
=== Men ===
Rank	Team	Points
1	Tunisia	744
2	Algeria	538
3	South Africa	426
4	Egypt	389
5	Cameroon	384
6	Zambia	297

=== Women ===
Rank	Team	Points
1	Tunisia	567
2	Egypt	411
3	Algeria	357
4	Cameroon	344
5	South Africa	273
6	Nigeria	234

== Participating nations ==
A total of 107 competitors from 17 nations participated.

- Algeria (14)
- Azerbaijan (3)
- Botswana (1)
- Cameroon (12)
- Democratic Republic of the Congo (1)
- Egypt (11)
- Ghana (3)
- Libya (4)
- Madagascar (1)
- Morocco (8)
- Mauritius (3)
- Nigeria (5)
- South Africa (13)
- Seychelles (2)
- Tunisia (19)
- Uganda (2)
- Zambia (5)

== Men's results ==
=== 55 kg ===
Rank	Athlete	Group	Snatch (kg)				Clean & Jerk (kg)				Total
Rank	Athlete	Group	1	2	3	Rank	1	2	3	Rank	Total
1st place, gold medalist(s)	Davis Niyoyita (UGA)	A	85	95	~~100~~	1st place, gold medalist(s)	120	~~126~~	~~126~~	1st place, gold medalist(s)	215
2nd place, silver medalist(s)	Isaac Sinka (ZAM)	A	70	75	~~80~~	2nd place, silver medalist(s)	85	90	95	2nd place, silver medalist(s)	170

=== 61 kg ===
Rank	Athlete	Group	Snatch (kg)				Clean & Jerk (kg)				Total
Rank	Athlete	Group	1	2	3	Rank	1	2	3	Rank	Total
1st place, gold medalist(s)	Amine Bouhijbha (TUN)	A	112	~~116~~	117	1st place, gold medalist(s)	140	~~148~~	~~148~~	1st place, gold medalist(s)	257
2nd place, silver medalist(s)	Jelgib Elion Ndunyama (COD)	A	75	~~80~~	80	3rd place, bronze medalist(s)	~~92~~	92	~~100~~	2nd place, silver medalist(s)	172
—	Jules Andriamahefa (MAD)	A	105	~~113~~	~~113~~	2nd place, silver medalist(s)	~~130~~	~~130~~	~~130~~	—	—

=== 67 kg ===
Rank	Athlete	Group	Snatch (kg)				Clean & Jerk (kg)				Total
Rank	Athlete	Group	1	2	3	Rank	1	2	3	Rank	Total
1st place, gold medalist(s)	Ayoub Salem (TUN)	A	121	124	126	2nd place, silver medalist(s)	150	~~154~~	154	1st place, gold medalist(s)	280
2nd place, silver medalist(s)	Akram Chekhchoukh (ALG)	A	122	125	127	1st place, gold medalist(s)	~~151~~	~~151~~	152	3rd place, bronze medalist(s)	279
3rd place, bronze medalist(s)	Mohamed Aziz Ben Hadj (TUN)	A	120	~~124~~	~~126~~	4	143	147	153	2nd place, silver medalist(s)	273
4	Mohamed Sameer Masoud (LBA)	A	110	116	122	3rd place, bronze medalist(s)	136	~~142~~	144	4	266
5	Abderrahmane Rhaloui (MAR)	A	105	110	~~115~~	5	130	135	~~140~~	6	245
6	Mohamed Moulabbi (MAR)	A	105	~~110~~	~~112~~	6	~~130~~	135	~~140~~	5	240
7	Daison Phiri (ZAM)	A	85	~~88~~	~~88~~	7	~~115~~	~~115~~	115	7	200
8	Francis Sebembe (ZAM)	A	65	70	74	8	90	~~95~~	~~195~~	8	164
—	Isa Rustamov (AZE)	A	130	135	138	—	160	164	~~168~~	—	302

=== 73 kg ===
Rank	Athlete	Group	Snatch (kg)				Clean & Jerk (kg)				Total
Rank	Athlete	Group	1	2	3	Rank	1	2	3	Rank	Total
1st place, gold medalist(s)	Karem Ben Hnia (TUN)	A	146	~~149~~	~~149~~	1st place, gold medalist(s)	180	~~187~~	~~187~~	1st place, gold medalist(s)	326
2nd place, silver medalist(s)	Samir Fardjallah (ALG)	A	141	~~145~~	~~146~~	3rd place, bronze medalist(s)	~~172~~	174	~~181~~	2nd place, silver medalist(s)	315
3rd place, bronze medalist(s)	Edidiong Umoafia (NGR)	A	137	142	~~146~~	2nd place, silver medalist(s)	160	170	~~175~~	3rd place, bronze medalist(s)	312
4	Gerard Abeussa (CMR)	A	122	126	~~130~~	6	157	162	168	4	294
5	Jon-Antohein Phillips (RSA)	A	108	~~113~~	~~115~~	7	150	~~156~~	~~156~~	5	258
6	Joseph Njovu (ZAM)	A	85	90	~~95~~	8	~~110~~	110	115	7	205
7	Steven Banda (ZAM)	A	~~75~~	75	77	9	95	~~97~~	~~97~~	8	172
—	Abderrahim Moum (MAR)	A	125	~~130~~	133	4	~~155~~	~~157~~	~~161~~	—	—
—	Ahsaan Shabi (LBA)	A	132	~~136~~	~~136~~	5	~~161~~	~~161~~	~~163~~	—	—
—	Mohamed Meknaci (ALG)	A	~~130~~	~~131~~	~~133~~	—	~~150~~	150	~~162~~	6	—
—	Omar Javadov (AZE)	A	135	140	143	—	160	167	~~171~~	—	310

=== 81 kg ===
Rank	Athlete	Group	Snatch (kg)				Clean & Jerk (kg)				Total
Rank	Athlete	Group	1	2	3	Rank	1	2	3	Rank	Total
1st place, gold medalist(s)	Ameur Messaoudi (ALG)	A	140	145	~~151~~	1st place, gold medalist(s)	170	~~177~~	~~178~~	1st place, gold medalist(s)	315
2nd place, silver medalist(s)	Hamza Ben Amor (TUN)	A	~~133~~	133	137	4	162	~~168~~	168	2nd place, silver medalist(s)	305
3rd place, bronze medalist(s)	Slim Bchini (TUN)	A	135	138	~~140~~	3rd place, bronze medalist(s)	162	~~165~~	~~165~~	3rd place, bronze medalist(s)	300
4	Jeremie Ngouanom Nzali (CMR)	A	~~126~~	126	~~131~~	6	~~161~~	161	~~166~~	4	287
5	Mohammed Alsharif Alzintani (LBA)	A	119	~~126~~	127	5	146	152	~~157~~	5	279
6	Roger Soukoudjou Sinetang (CMR)	A	120	125	~~130~~	7	151	~~156~~	~~157~~	6	276
7	Daniel Katzav (RSA)	A	100	~~107~~	110	8	130	~~137~~	140	7	250
—	Mohamed Messaour (ALG)	A	~~135~~	135	139	2nd place, silver medalist(s)	~~161~~	~~161~~	~~161~~	—	—

=== 89 kg ===
Rank	Athlete	Group	Snatch (kg)				Clean & Jerk (kg)				Total
Rank	Athlete	Group	1	2	3	Rank	1	2	3	Rank	Total
1st place, gold medalist(s)	Karim Abokahla (EGY)	A	162	~~167~~	167	1st place, gold medalist(s)	200	208	~~213~~	1st place, gold medalist(s)	375
2nd place, silver medalist(s)	Faris Touairi (ALG)	A	160	~~163~~	~~164~~	3rd place, bronze medalist(s)	182	192	~~201~~	2nd place, silver medalist(s)	352
3rd place, bronze medalist(s)	Islam Aboelwafa (EGY)	A	148	155	161	2nd place, silver medalist(s)	180	~~190~~	190	3rd place, bronze medalist(s)	351
4	Akano Desmond (NGR)	A	140	~~145~~	145	4	180	~~190~~	190	4	335
5	Daniel Onana Tanga (CMR)	A	~~140~~	140	~~145~~	5	~~180~~	~~180~~	180	6	320
6	Said Alioua (MAR)	A	135	~~140~~	~~141~~	6	~~180~~	~~180~~	181	5	316
7	Rayen Ghrissa (TUN)	A	122	127	~~130~~	7	155	161	~~164~~	7	288
8	Vuyani Mashego (RSA)	A	121	~~125~~	126	8	148	~~156~~	~~160~~	8	274
9	Andre William Gadney (RSA)	A	114	~~120~~	~~122~~	9	134	140	145	9	259

=== 96 kg ===
Rank	Athlete	Group	Snatch (kg)				Clean & Jerk (kg)				Total
Rank	Athlete	Group	1	2	3	Rank	1	2	3	Rank	Total
1st place, gold medalist(s)	Salim Elbagor (ALG)	A	145	152	~~160~~	1st place, gold medalist(s)	~~175~~	175	180	1st place, gold medalist(s)	332
2nd place, silver medalist(s)	Ayoub Dridi (TUN)	A	130	~~135~~	135	2nd place, silver medalist(s)	170	176	~~181~~	2nd place, silver medalist(s)	311
3rd place, bronze medalist(s)	Laur Lvain Woudje Nzale (CMR)	A	115	125	~~131~~	3rd place, bronze medalist(s)	155	160	~~170~~	3rd place, bronze medalist(s)	285
—	Mahmoud Hosny (EGY)	A	~~120~~	—	—	—	~~150~~	—	—	—	—

=== 102 kg ===
Rank	Athlete	Group	Snatch (kg)				Clean & Jerk (kg)				Total
Rank	Athlete	Group	1	2	3	Rank	1	2	3	Rank	Total
1st place, gold medalist(s)	Yasser Usama Hemdan (EGY)	A	160	165	168	1st place, gold medalist(s)	200	204	208	1st place, gold medalist(s)	376
2nd place, silver medalist(s)	Aymen Touairi (ALG)	A	163	166	~~171~~	2nd place, silver medalist(s)	203	~~208~~	~~211~~	2nd place, silver medalist(s)	369
3rd place, bronze medalist(s)	Mohamed Abdelalim (EGY)	A	164	~~170~~	~~170~~	3rd place, bronze medalist(s)	200	~~205~~	~~205~~	3rd place, bronze medalist(s)	364
4	Junior Ngadja Nyabeyeu (CMR)	A	156	~~161~~	~~161~~	4	~~195~~	195	~~201~~	4	351
5	Khelwin Juboo (MRI)	A	135	~~140~~	140	5	168	175	180	5	320
6	Ruben Burger (RSA)	A	~~138~~	~~140~~	140	6	~~170~~	170	~~177~~	6	310
—	Ahmed Abuzriba (LBA)	A	~~130~~	—	—	—	~~180~~	—	—	—	—

=== 109 kg ===
Rank	Athlete	Group	Snatch (kg)				Clean & Jerk (kg)				Total
Rank	Athlete	Group	1	2	3	Rank	1	2	3	Rank	Total
1st place, gold medalist(s)	Aymen Bacha (TUN)	A	163	170	~~178~~	1st place, gold medalist(s)	190	~~200~~	205	1st place, gold medalist(s)	375
2nd place, silver medalist(s)	Antony Swanepoel (RSA)	A	115	~~123~~	123	2nd place, silver medalist(s)	140	147	~~150~~	2nd place, silver medalist(s)	270
3rd place, bronze medalist(s)	Johannes Beukman (RSA)	A	~~120~~	120	~~126~~	3rd place, bronze medalist(s)	~~145~~	145	~~154~~	3rd place, bronze medalist(s)	265

=== +109 kg ===
Rank	Athlete	Group	Snatch (kg)				Clean & Jerk (kg)				Total
Rank	Athlete	Group	1	2	3	Rank	1	2	3	Rank	Total
1st place, gold medalist(s)	Abdelrahman El-Sayed (EGY)	A	175	185	~~193~~	2nd place, silver medalist(s)	226	243	~~245~~	1st place, gold medalist(s)	428
2nd place, silver medalist(s)	Bilal Bouamr (MAR)	A	144	151	154	3rd place, bronze medalist(s)	~~181~~	182	186	2nd place, silver medalist(s)	340
3rd place, bronze medalist(s)	Maik Lahamadi Ezzedine (TUN)	A	143	150	~~153~~	4	180	~~183~~	~~186~~	3rd place, bronze medalist(s)	330
4	Bokang Kagiso (BOT)	A	120	125	~~130~~	5	~~150~~	151	155	4	280
—	Walid Bidani (ALG)	A	192	~~197~~	~~199~~	1st place, gold medalist(s)	~~225~~	~~225~~	~~225~~	—	—

== Women's results ==
=== 45 kg ===
Rank	Athlete	Group	Snatch (kg)				Clean & Jerk (kg)				Total
Rank	Athlete	Group	1	2	3	Rank	1	2	3	Rank	Total
1st place, gold medalist(s)	Nadia Katbi (ALG)	A	45	~~51~~	51	1st place, gold medalist(s)	60	65	~~70~~	1st place, gold medalist(s)	116
—	Nazila Ismayilov (AZE)	A	55	60	~~62~~	—	66	72	~~75~~	—	132

=== 49 kg ===
Rank	Athlete	Group	Snatch (kg)				Clean & Jerk (kg)				Total
Rank	Athlete	Group	1	2	3	Rank	1	2	3	Rank	Total
1st place, gold medalist(s)	Maha Fajreslam (MAR)	A	57	60	64	1st place, gold medalist(s)	74	79	~~82~~	2nd place, silver medalist(s)	143
2nd place, silver medalist(s)	Nour Khafaoui (TUN)	A	57	~~61~~	~~61~~	3rd place, bronze medalist(s)	75	81	~~85~~	1st place, gold medalist(s)	138
3rd place, bronze medalist(s)	Winnifred Ntumi (GHA)	A	56	~~58~~	58	2nd place, silver medalist(s)	68	71	~~73~~	3rd place, bronze medalist(s)	129

=== 55 kg ===
Rank	Athlete	Group	Snatch (kg)				Clean & Jerk (kg)				Total
Rank	Athlete	Group	1	2	3	Rank	1	2	3	Rank	Total
1st place, gold medalist(s)	Eya Aquadi (TUN)	A	65	69	72	1st place, gold medalist(s)	85	90	93	1st place, gold medalist(s)	165
2nd place, silver medalist(s)	Israa Bejaoui (TUN)	A	65	71	~~73~~	2nd place, silver medalist(s)	85	90	~~93~~	2nd place, silver medalist(s)	161

=== 59 kg ===
Rank	Athlete	Group	Snatch (kg)				Clean & Jerk (kg)				Total
Rank	Athlete	Group	1	2	3	Rank	1	2	3	Rank	Total
1st place, gold medalist(s)	Rafiatu Lawal (NGR)	A	~~91~~	91	95	1st place, gold medalist(s)	~~115~~	115	122	1st place, gold medalist(s)	217
2nd place, silver medalist(s)	Adijat Olarinoye (NGR)	A	90	~~93~~	93	2nd place, silver medalist(s)	110	~~118~~	118	2nd place, silver medalist(s)	211
3rd place, bronze medalist(s)	Ech-Chaibia Ech-Chachouiy (MAR)	A	76	~~80~~	~~81~~	5	91	~~95~~	~~96~~	4	167
4	Sandra Owusu (GHA)	A	~~72~~	~~72~~	72	6	85	~~88~~	~~88~~	5	157
5	Ebongo Nelly Ebong (CMR)	A	51	~~55~~	55	7	67	~~71~~	71	6	126
–	Georgia Love (RSA)	A	~~71~~	~~71~~	~~71~~	–	–	–	–	–	–
–	Ghofrane Belkhir (TUN)	A	88	92	~~96~~	3rd place, bronze medalist(s)	–	–	–	–	–
–	Souhir Khmiri (TUN)	A	~~78~~	~~78~~	~~78~~	–	95	~~103~~	~~103~~	3rd place, bronze medalist(s)	–
–	Anneke Spies (RSA)	A	~~74~~	~~74~~	~~75~~	–	~~105~~	~~105~~	~~105~~	–	–

=== 64 kg ===
Rank	Athlete	Group	Snatch (kg)				Clean & Jerk (kg)				Total
Rank	Athlete	Group	1	2	3	Rank	1	2	3	Rank	Total
1st place, gold medalist(s)	Chaima Rahmouni (TUN)	A	87	90	~~92~~	1st place, gold medalist(s)	108	~~111~~	~~111~~	1st place, gold medalist(s)	198
2nd place, silver medalist(s)	Jawaher Gesmi (TUN)	A	83	86	~~88~~	2nd place, silver medalist(s)	107	~~110~~	~~112~~	2nd place, silver medalist(s)	193
3rd place, bronze medalist(s)	Ruby Malvina (SEY)	A	75	80	~~87~~	3rd place, bronze medalist(s)	100	107	~~113~~	3rd place, bronze medalist(s)	187
4	Fatima Zohra Laghouati (ALG)	A	73	~~76~~	76	4	95	~~101~~	~~101~~	4	171
5	Yolandi van Ryneveld (RSA)	A	70	~~73~~	~~73~~	5	86	91	~~96~~	5	161
6	Chantelle Burger (RSA)	A	64	67	70	6	83	86	~~90~~	6	156
7	Lydia Nakidde (UGA)	A	60	65	~~70~~	7	75	80	85	7	150

=== 71 kg ===
Rank	Athlete	Group	Snatch (kg)				Clean & Jerk (kg)				Total
Rank	Athlete	Group	1	2	3	Rank	1	2	3	Rank	Total
1st place, gold medalist(s)	Neama Said (EGY)	A	100	103	~~105~~	1st place, gold medalist(s)	122	126	~~130~~	1st place, gold medalist(s)	229
2nd place, silver medalist(s)	Joy Ogbonne Eze (NGR)	A	97	102	~~105~~	2nd place, silver medalist(s)	~~120~~	120	125	2nd place, silver medalist(s)	227
3rd place, bronze medalist(s)	Ketty Lent (MRI)	A	86	~~89~~	89	3rd place, bronze medalist(s)	103	108	~~110~~	3rd place, bronze medalist(s)	197
4	Laryne Jefferies (RSA)	A	~~83~~	83	86	5	103	106	~~110~~	4	192
5	Rkia Sabihi (MAR)	A	80	84	87	4	104	~~109~~	~~109~~	5	191
6	Nawres Hamroui (TUN)	A	76	~~81~~	~~81~~	7	95	100	~~103~~	6	176
7	Nihad Belounis (ALG)	A	72	~~77~~	77	6	92	97	~~101~~	7	174
—	Renee Manuela Hyeng (CMR)	A	~~66~~	~~66~~	~~66~~	—	—	—	—	—	—

=== 76 kg ===
Rank	Athlete	Group	Snatch (kg)				Clean & Jerk (kg)				Total
Rank	Athlete	Group	1	2	3	Rank	1	2	3	Rank	Total
1st place, gold medalist(s)	Joelita Coloma (SEY)	A	80	84	85	1st place, gold medalist(s)	100	~~101~~	—	4	185
2nd place, silver medalist(s)	Bouchra Fatima Zohra Hirech (ALG)	A	81	~~85~~	~~86~~	2nd place, silver medalist(s)	101	103	~~106~~	1st place, gold medalist(s)	184
3rd place, bronze medalist(s)	Rayssa Djifack Ma-Atemken Zomgoua (CMR)	A	77	~~82~~	~~83~~	4	96	~~101~~	103	2nd place, silver medalist(s)	180
4	Zeineb Maghraoui (TUN)	A	~~78~~	78	~~83~~	3rd place, bronze medalist(s)	101	~~103~~	~~104~~	3rd place, bronze medalist(s)	179
5	Kerrin Leigh Bough (RSA)	A	71	77	~~83~~	5	90	96	~~101~~	5	173

=== 81 kg ===
Rank	Athlete	Group	Snatch (kg)				Clean & Jerk (kg)				Total
Rank	Athlete	Group	1	2	3	Rank	1	2	3	Rank	Total
1st place, gold medalist(s)	Sara Ahmed (EGY)	A	110	114	117	1st place, gold medalist(s)	140	146	151	1st place, gold medalist(s)	268
2nd place, silver medalist(s)	Jeanne Eyenga (CMR)	A	~~89~~	89	96	2nd place, silver medalist(s)	117	~~121~~	121	2nd place, silver medalist(s)	217

=== 87 kg ===
Rank	Athlete	Group	Snatch (kg)				Clean & Jerk (kg)				Total
Rank	Athlete	Group	1	2	3	Rank	1	2	3	Rank	Total
1st place, gold medalist(s)	Samar Said (EGY)	A	~~100~~	100	105	1st place, gold medalist(s)	116	~~124~~	124	2nd place, silver medalist(s)	229
2nd place, silver medalist(s)	Fatma Ahmed (EGY)	A	97	~~100~~	~~101~~	2nd place, silver medalist(s)	115	123	125	1st place, gold medalist(s)	222
3rd place, bronze medalist(s)	Alison Sunee (MRI)	A	75	82	85	3rd place, bronze medalist(s)	97	106	~~110~~	3rd place, bronze medalist(s)	191
4	Phalone Leticia Nzimo (CMR)	A	75	81	~~85~~	4	102	~~107~~	~~111~~	4	183

=== +87 kg ===
Rank	Athlete	Group	Snatch (kg)				Clean & Jerk (kg)				Total
Rank	Athlete	Group	1	2	3	Rank	1	2	3	Rank	Total
1st place, gold medalist(s)	Halima Abdelazim (EGY)	A	~~110~~	110	115	1st place, gold medalist(s)	~~145~~	~~145~~	145	1st place, gold medalist(s)	260
2nd place, silver medalist(s)	Estelle Momeni (CMR)	A	81	~~87~~	~~87~~	3rd place, bronze medalist(s)	95	~~103~~	~~107~~	2nd place, silver medalist(s)	176
3rd place, bronze medalist(s)	Amina Yahiamamoun (ALG)	A	75	82	~~88~~	2nd place, silver medalist(s)	93	~~105~~	~~106~~	3rd place, bronze medalist(s)	175
4	Marie Korkor Agbah-Hughes (GHA)	A	60	64	66	4	85	89	92	4	158

== Notes ==
1. Three Azerbaijani athletes participated in the championships as guest athletes, due to leaving the 2023 European Weightlifting Championships over a flag desecration incident.
