= Popy Hazarika =

Indian weightlifter (born 1998)

Personal information
- Nationality: Indian
- Born: 8 December 1998 (age 27) Sibsagar, Assam, India
- Height: 1.64 m (5 ft 5 in) (2022)
- Weight: 57 kg (126 lb) (2022)

Sport
- Country: India
- Sport: Weightlifting
- Event: 59 kg
Medal record
Women's weightlifting
Representing India
Commonwealth Championships
Gold medal – first place	2023 Noida	59 kg
Silver medal – second place	2021 Tashkent	59 kg

Popy Hazarika (born 8 December 1998) is an Indian weightlifter. She won a silver medal at 2021 Commonwealth Weightlifting Championships in Tashkent. In July 2022 she placed Seventh in the women's 59 kg weightlifting event at the 2022 Commonwealth Games. She works in the Indian Railway.

In 2023, she won the gold medal in the women's 59 kg category at the 2023 Commonwealth Weightlifting Championships held at Noida.
