= Edidiong Umoafia =

Nigerian weightlifter (born 2002)

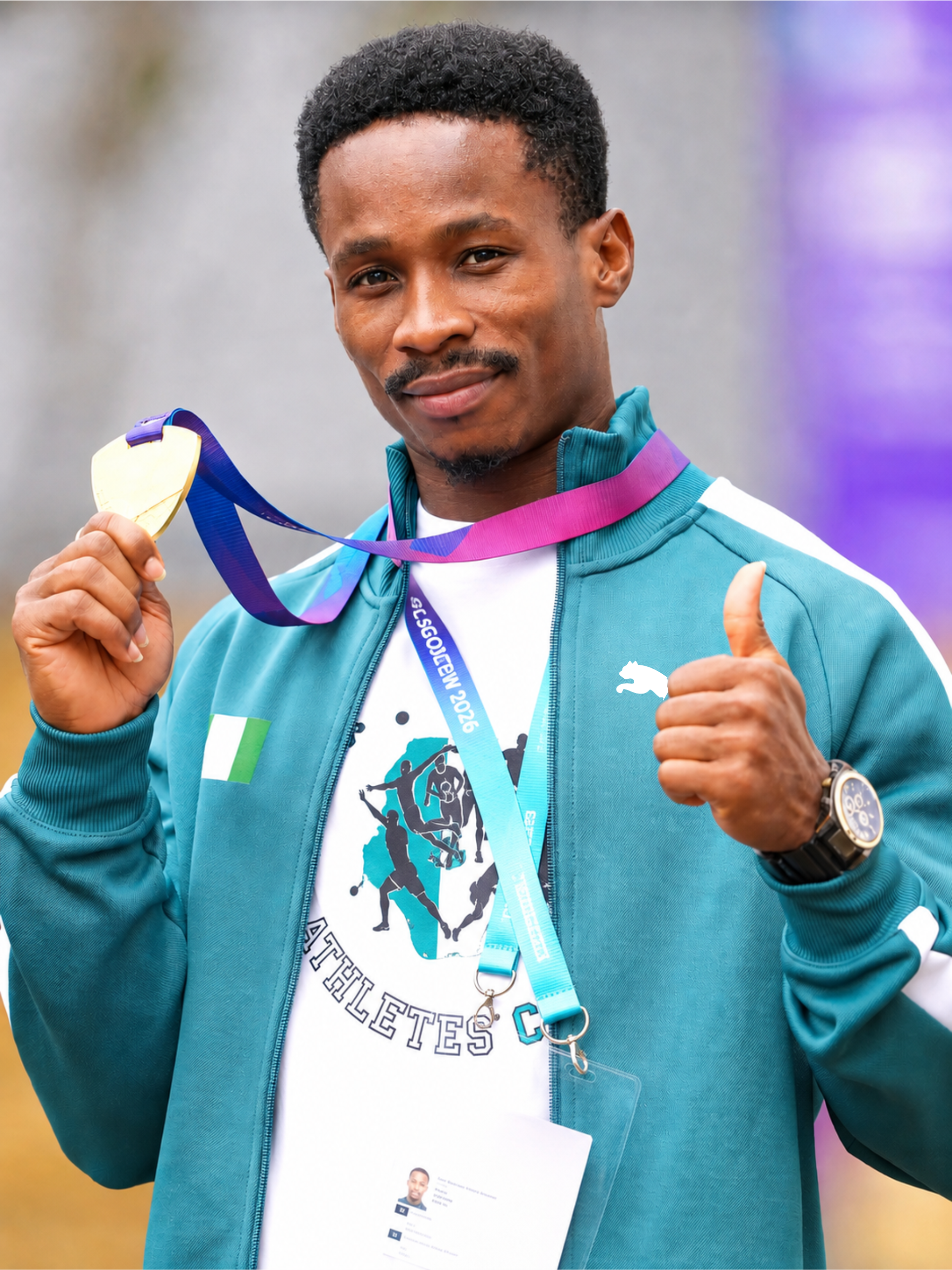

Personal information
- Full name: Edidiong Joseph Umoafia
- Born: 24 September 2002 (age 23)

Sport
- Country: Nigeria
- Sport: Weightlifting
- Weight class: 67 kg 73 kg
Medal record
Men's weightlifting
Representing Nigeria
Commonwealth Games
Gold medal – first place	2026 Glasgow	71 kg
Bronze medal – third place	2022 Birmingham	67 kg
Islamic Solidarity Games
Gold medal – first place	2025 Riyadh	71 kg S
Silver medal – second place	2025 Riyadh	71 kg T
Bronze medal – third place	2025 Riyadh	71 kg CJ
African Championships
Silver medal – second place	2026 Ismailia	71 kg
Bronze medal – third place	2023 Tunis	73 kg
African Games
Gold medal – first place	2023 Accra	67 kg
Commonwealth Championships
Silver medal – second place	2021 Tashkent	67 kg

Edidiong Joseph Umoafia (born 24 September 2002) is a Nigerian weightlifter.

== Career ==
Edidiong Joseph Umoafia competed at the 2026 Commonwealth Games where he won the gold medal in weightlifting, breaking two world records in the men's 71 kg event.

He also competed at the 2022 Commonwealth Games in the weightlifting competition, winning the bronze medal in the men's 67 kg event. He was the second person to win a medal for his country at the 2022 Commonwealth Games.
