= Morghan King =

American weightlifter

Personal information
- Born: October 8, 1985 (age 39)
- Height: 1.53 m (5 ft 0 in)
- Weight: 48 kg (106 lb)

Sport
- Country: United States
- Sport: Weightlifting
- Event: Women's 48 kg

Morghan King is an American weightlifter who competed at the 2016 Olympics.

== 2013 season ==
At the 2013 World Weightlifting Championships she finished 11th.

== 2014 season ==
At the 2014 World Weightlifting Championships she finished 10th. She also finished 4th at the 2014 Pan American Championships.

== 2015 season ==
King finished 4th at the 2015 Pan American Games. She also finished 23rd at the 2015 World Weightlifting Championships.

== 2016 season ==
With a lift of 100 kg in the clean & jerk, over twice her body weight of 48 kg, King qualified for the 2016 Olympics. At the Olympics she finished 6th.
