= Angie Palacios =

Ecuadorian weightlifter (born 2000)

Personal information
- Born: Angie Paola Palacios Dájomes; September 12, 2000 (age 25) Shell, Ecuador
- Weight: 63.30 kg (140 lb)

Sport
- Country: Ecuador
- Sport: Weightlifting
- Event: 64 kg
- Coached by: Hugo Quelal, Jorge Rivero

Achievements and titles
- Personal bests: Snatch: 121 kg (2023, CWR); Clean and jerk: 140 kg (2023); Total: 261 kg (2023)
Medal record
Representing Ecuador
Women's weightlifting
Olympic Games
Bronze medal – third place	2024 Paris	–71 kg
World Championships
Silver medal – second place	2023 Riyadh	–71 kg
Bronze medal – third place	2022 Bogotá	–71 kg
Pan American Games
Gold medal – first place	2023 Santiago	–71 kg
Bronze medal – third place	2019 Lima	–64 kg
Pan American Championships
Gold medal – first place	2022 Bogotá	–71 kg
Gold medal – first place	2023 Bariloche	–71 kg
Gold medal – first place	2024 Caracas	–71 kg
Bronze medal – third place	2020 Santo Domingo	–64 kg
South American Games
Gold medal – first place	2022 Asunción	–76 kg
Junior World Championships
Silver medal – second place	2019 Suva	–64 kg
IWF Grand Prix
Gold medal – first place	2023 Havana	–71 kg

Angie Paola Palacios Dájomes (born September 12, 2000) is an Ecuadorian weightlifter and two time Youth World Champion competing in the 69 kg category until 2018 and 64 kg starting in 2018 after the International Weightlifting Federation reorganized the categories.

== Career ==
She competed in the 64 kg division at the 2019 Junior World Weightlifting Championships in Fiji winning silver medals in the snatch, clean & jerk, and total. Later she competed at the 2019 Pan American Games in the 64 kg division winning a bronze medal.

Palacios represented Ecuador at the 2020 Summer Olympics. She placed sixth with a total of 226 kg.

Palacios won the gold medal in the women's 71 kg event at the 2022 Pan American Weightlifting Championships held in Bogotá, Colombia. She also won medals in the Snatch and Clean & Jerk events in this competition.

Palacios won the gold medal in the women's 76 kg event at the 2022 South American Games held in Asunción, Paraguay. She won the gold medal in the women's 71 kg event at the 2023 Pan American Weightlifting Championships held in Bariloche, Argentina. In the same year, she won the silver medal in the women's 71 kg event at the World Weightlifting Championships held in Riyadh, Saudi Arabia.

She won the gold medal in the women's 71 kg event at the 2023 Pan American Games held in Santiago, Chile. In 2024, she won the gold medal in her event at the Pan American Weightlifting Championships held in Caracas, Venezuela.

In 2024, Palacios competed in the women's 71 kg event at the 2024 Summer Olympics held in Paris, France. She won a bronze medal with a total of 256 kg. She was second after the Snatch.

== Personal life ==
She is the younger sister of Olympic champion, three-time Junior World champion, and 6-time Pan American champion weightlifter Neisi Dajomes.

== Achievements ==
Year	Venue	Weight	Snatch (kg)				Clean & Jerk (kg)				Total	Rank
Year	Venue	Weight	1	2	3	Rank	1	2	3	Rank	Total	Rank
Olympic Games
2021	Tokyo, Japan	64 kg	100	104	~~108~~	—N/a	122	~~127~~	~~127~~	—N/a	226	6
2024	Paris, France	71 kg	110	114	116	—N/a	135	138	140	—N/a	256	3rd place, bronze medalist(s)
World Championships
2017	Anaheim, United States	69 kg	90	~~94~~	95	9	112	116	120	11	215	9
2018	Ashgabat, Turkmenistan	64 kg	91	95	100	9	115	120	122	11	222	9
2019	Pattaya, Thailand	64 kg	~~101~~	~~101~~	~~101~~	—	115	—	—	23	—	—
2022	Bogotá, Colombia	71 kg	110	~~115~~	116	2nd place, silver medalist(s)	132	136	~~140~~	5	252	3rd place, bronze medalist(s)
2023	Riyadh, Saudi Arabia	71 kg	~~113~~	113	117	2nd place, silver medalist(s)	131	135	138	3rd place, bronze medalist(s)	255	2nd place, silver medalist(s)
IWF World Cup
2024	Phuket, Thailand	71 kg	~~113~~	113	~~116~~	4	132	~~136~~	—	8	245	6
Pan American Games
2019	Lima, Peru	64 kg	98	103	105	—N/a	~~118~~	118	123	—N/a	228	3rd place, bronze medalist(s)
2023	Santiago, Chile	71 kg	110	115	118	—N/a	130	135	—	—N/a	253	1st place, gold medalist(s)
Pan American Championships
2017	Miami, United States	69 kg	95	99	~~101~~	3rd place, bronze medalist(s)	115	120	123	4	222	4
2021	Santo Domingo, Dominican Republic	64 kg	100	105	~~108~~	2nd place, silver medalist(s)	115	120	~~125~~	6	225	3rd place, bronze medalist(s)
2022	Bogotá, Colombia	71 kg	107	111	113	1st place, gold medalist(s)	130	134	~~137~~	2nd place, silver medalist(s)	247	1st place, gold medalist(s)
2023	Bariloche, Argentina	71 kg	106	110	111	1st place, gold medalist(s)	130	~~135~~	137	3rd place, bronze medalist(s)	248	1st place, gold medalist(s)
2024	Caracas, Venezuela	71 kg	105	110	—	1st place, gold medalist(s)	125	130	—	1st place, gold medalist(s)	240	1st place, gold medalist(s)
Junior World Championships
2019	Suva, Fiji	64 kg	93	96	101	2nd place, silver medalist(s)	116	~~119~~	119	2nd place, silver medalist(s)	220	2nd place, silver medalist(s)
IWF Grand Prix
2023	Havana, Cuba	71 kg	113	117	121 CWR	1st place, gold medalist(s)	135	140	~~143~~	1st place, gold medalist(s)	261	1st place, gold medalist(s)
