= 2021 Commonwealth Weightlifting Championships =

- Host city: Tashkent, Uzbekistan
- Dates: 7–17 December 2021
- Main venue: Uzbekistan Sport Complex and Gymnastics Sport Complex

The 2021 Commonwealth Weightlifting Championships were held at the Uzbekistan Sport Complex and Gymnastics Sport Complex in Tashkent, Uzbekistan from 7 to 17 December 2021.

In agreement with the IWF, the event — having been postponed twice before (in Singapore and, from the previous year, Nauru) — was held within that year's World Championships. After the Omicron variant emerged, updated border restrictions rendered athletes from several Commonwealth countries unable to enter Uzbekistan, and Great Britain chose to send a small Worlds-only team not co-registered for Home Nations representation. Nonetheless, the championships went ahead, with the winners in qualifying weight classes also securing their places at the 2022 Commonwealth Games.

== Medal table ==
Rank	Nation	Gold	Silver	Bronze	Total
1	Canada	5	2	0	7
2	India	4	7	5	16
3	Nigeria	4	1	0	5
4	Malaysia	2	1	0	3
5	Sri Lanka	1	1	5	7
6	Australia	1	1	2	4
7	Cameroon	1	1	0	2
8	New Zealand	1	0	0	1
9	Cyprus	0	1	0	1
9	Mauritius	0	1	0	1
9	Pakistan	0	1	0	1
9	Uganda	0	1	0	1
13	Malta	0	0	2	2
14	Ghana	0	0	1	1
14	Kenya	0	0	1	1
Totals (15 entries)		19	18	16	53

== Medal summary ==
=== Men ===
Event	Gold		Silver		Bronze	
55 kg	Aniq Kasdan; Malaysia	249 kg	Davis Niyoyita; Uganda	220 kg	Benjamin Ochoma; Kenya	135 kg
61 kg	Aznil Bidin; Malaysia	273 kg	Gururaja Poojary; India	265 kg	Thilanka Palangasinghe; Sri Lanka	261 kg
67 kg	Jeremy Lalrinnunga; India	305 kg	Joseph Edidiong; Nigeria	295 kg	Manoj Wijesinghe; Sri Lanka	254 kg
73 kg	Achinta Sheuli; India	316 kg	Muhammad Erry Hidayat; Malaysia	301 kg	Indika Dissanayake; Sri Lanka	286 kg
81 kg	Ajay Singh; India	322 kg	Kyle Bruce; Australia	316 kg	Chinthana Vidanage; Sri Lanka	300 kg
89 kg	Alex Bellemarre; Canada	350 kg	Braydon Kennedy; Canada	335 kg	Beau Garrett; Australia	301 kg
96 kg	Boady Santavy; Canada	379 kg	Antonis Martasidis; Cyprus	343 kg	Vikas Thakur; India	339 kg
102 kg	Rashed Quran; Canada	330 kg	Jack Madanamoothoo; Mauritius	306 kg	Not awarded (lack of entries)	
109 kg	Junior Ngadja Nyabeyeu; Cameroon	360 kg	Lovepreet Singh; India	348 kg	Jackson Roberts-Young; Australia	337 kg
+109 kg	David Liti; New Zealand	407 kg	Nooh Dastgir Butt; Pakistan	390 kg	Gurdeep Singh; India	389 kg

=== Women ===
Event	Gold		Silver		Bronze	
45 kg	Srimali Samarakoon; Sri Lanka	136 kg	Not awarded (lack of entries)			
49 kg	Stella Kingsley; Nigeria	168 kg	Jhilli Dalabehera; India	167 kg	Winnifred Ntumi; Ghana	135 kg
55 kg	Adijat Olarinoye; Nigeria	203 kg	Bindyarani Devi Sorokhaibam; India	198 kg	Tenishia Thornton; Malta	162 kg
59 kg	Rafiatu Lawal; Nigeria	207 kg	Popy Hazarika; India	189 kg	Nadeeshani Rajapaksha; Sri Lanka	164 kg
64 kg	Sarah Cochrane; Australia	210 kg	Rachel Siemens; Canada	195 kg	Yasmin Zammit Stevens; Malta	187 kg
71 kg	Joy Ogbonne Eze; Nigeria	230 kg	Harjinder Kaur; India	211 kg	Lalchhanhimi; India	209 kg
76 kg	Maya Laylor; Canada	229 kg	Punam Yadav; India	220 kg	Arockiya Alish; India	214 kg
81 kg	Not awarded (lack of entries, no registered total)					
87 kg	Kristel Ngarlem; Canada	224 kg	Clementine Meukeugni; Cameroon	212 kg	Anuradha Pavunraj; India	195 kg
+87 kg	Purnima Pandey; India	229 kg	Trimalee Haputenne; Sri Lanka	187 kg	Not awarded (lack of entries)	
