= Jaswant Shergill =

British weightlifter

Personal information
- Full name: Jaswant Singh Shergill
- Nationality: United Kingdom (England)
- Born: 14 January 1993 (age 33)
- Weight: 67 kg (148 lb)

Sport
- Country: England
- Sport: Weightlifting
- Weight class: 67 kg
- Team: National team
- Updated on 19 October 2016

Jaswant Singh Shergill (born 14 January 1993) is a British male weightlifter, competing in the 67 kg category. From Birmingham, represented England at the 2014 Commonwealth Games in the 62 kg event.

== Major competitions ==
Year	Venue	Weight	Snatch (kg)				Clean & Jerk (kg)				Total	Rank
Year	Venue	Weight	1	2	3	Rank	1	2	3	Rank	Total	Rank
Commonwealth Games
2014	Glasgow, Scotland	62 kg	105	110	~~112~~	—N/a	136	140	~~142~~	—N/a	250	11
