= Patricia Strenius =

Swedish weightlifter (born 1989)

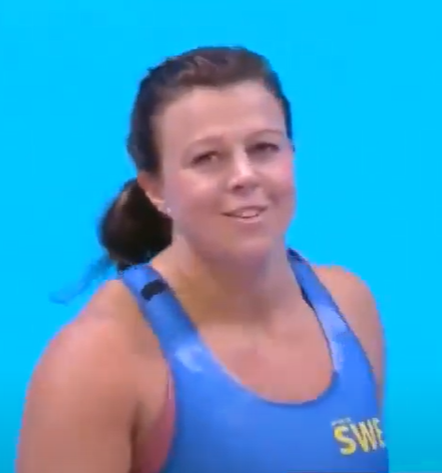
- Patricia in 2020

Personal information
- Nationality: Swedish
- Born: Patricia Caroline Strenius; 23 November 1989 (age 36) Karlskrona, Sweden

Sport
- Sport: Weightlifting
- Event: –76 kg
Medal record
Women's weightlifting
Representing Sweden
World Championships
Bronze medal – third place	2021 Tashkent	–71 kg
European Championships
Gold medal – first place	2018 Bucharest	–69 kg
Gold medal – first place	2022 Tirana	–71 kg
Bronze medal – third place	2019 Batumi	–76 kg

Patricia Strenius (born 23 November 1989 in Karlskrona) is a Swedish weightlifter. She won the bronze medal in the women's 71 kg event at the 2021 World Weightlifting Championships held in Tashkent, Uzbekistan.

Strenius competed at the women's 69 kg event at the 2018 European Weightlifting Championships in Bucharest, Romania, winning a silver medal in the snatch competition (99 kg), a gold medal at the clean and jerk competition (131 kg) and a gold medal in the total score (230 kg). The last time Sweden had a European weightlifting champion was in 1949, when Arvid Andersson won the title. Strenius also set a new Swedish and Nordic record with the 131 kg lift at the Clean & Jerk competition. The lift total of 230 kg is also a new Swedish record.

She represented Sweden at the 2020 Summer Olympics in Tokyo, Japan. She competed in the women's 76 kg event.

During the Olympics in Tokyo 2021, she managed to place 4th with a snatch of 102 kg on her 3rd attempt, and 133 kg in the clean and jerk. She did make an attempt at 138 kg but failed. Her score resulted in placing 4th with a total score of 235 kg.

== Major results ==
Year	Venue	Weight	Snatch (kg)				Clean & Jerk (kg)				Total	Rank
Year	Venue	Weight	1	2	3	Rank	1	2	3	Rank	Total	Rank
Olympic Games
2020	Tokyo, Japan	76 kg	~~102~~	~~102~~	102	7	130	133	~~138~~	4	235	4
World Championships
2015	Houston, United States	63 kg	85	88	~~91~~	25	115	~~118~~	118	14	206	17
2017	Anaheim, United States	69 kg	94	~~99~~	~~99~~	10	121	~~127~~	127	6	221	7
2018	Ashgabat, Turkmenistan	71 kg	~~97~~	~~97~~	~~97~~	—	125	128	131	5	—	—
2019	Pattaya, Thailand	76 kg	98	102	~~105~~	9	~~129~~	~~129~~	129	8	231	7
2021	Tashkent, Uzbekistan	71 kg	98	101	104	3rd place, bronze medalist(s)	127	~~130~~	~~130~~	5	231	3rd place, bronze medalist(s)
