= Kristel Macrohon =

Filipino weightlifter (born 1996)

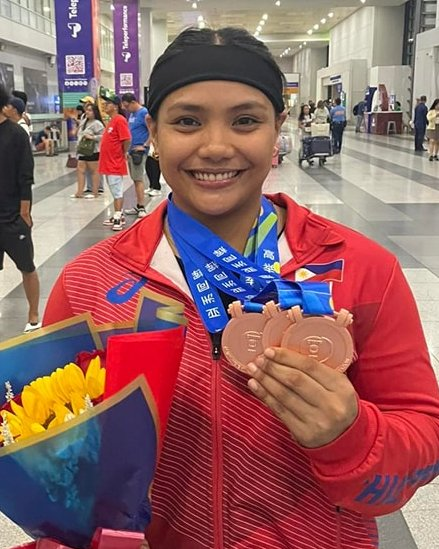
- Macrohon in 2025

Personal information
- Born: 2 September 1996 (age 30)

Sport
- Country: Philippines
- Sport: Weightlifting
Medal record
Women's weightlifting
Representing Philippines
Southeast Asian Games
Gold medal – first place	2019 Philippines	71 kg
Bronze medal – third place	2025 Thailand	69 kg
Asian Indoor and Martial Arts Games
Bronze medal – third place	2017 Ashgabat	69 kg
Asian Championships
Bronze medal – third place	2020 Tashkent	76 kg
Bronze medal – third place	2025 Jiangshan	71 kg
IWF World Cup
Bronze medal – third place	2020 Rome	71 kg

Kristel Macrohon (born 2 September 1996) is a Filipino weightlifter. She won the gold medal in the women's 71 kg event at the 2019 Southeast Asian Games held in Manila, Philippines.

At the 2017 Asian Indoor and Martial Arts Games held in Ashgabat, Turkmenistan, she won the bronze medal in the women's 69 kg event. In 2018, she represented the Philippines at the Asian Games held in Jakarta, Indonesia in the women's 69 kg event where she finished in last place. In that same year, she competed in the women's 71 kg event at the 2018 World Weightlifting Championships held in Ashgabat, Turkmenistan. In 2020, she won the bronze medal in the women's 71 kg event at the Roma 2020 World Cup in Rome, Italy.

She competed in the women's 71 kg event at the 2021 World Weightlifting Championships held in Tashkent, Uzbekistan.
