= Zhang Wangli =

Chinese weightlifter (born 1996)

Personal information
- Nationality: Chinese
- Born: 27 May 1996 (age 30)
- Weight: 73.95 kg (163 lb)

Sport
- Country: China
- Sport: Weightlifting
- Event: –76 kg
Medal record
Representing China
World Championships
Gold medal – first place	2018 Ashgabat	–71 kg
Silver medal – second place	2019 Pattaya	–76 kg
Asian Championships
Gold medal – first place	2020 Tashkent	–76 kg
Gold medal – first place	2016 Tashkent	–69 kg

Zhang Wangli (Chinese: 张旺丽; pinyin: Zhàng Wànglì; born 27 May 1996) is a Chinese weightlifter, and World Champion competing in the 69 kg category until 2018, and the 71 kg and 76 kg categories starting in 2018 after the International Weightlifting Federation reorganized the categories.

== Career ==
She participated at the 2018 World Weightlifting Championships in the 71 kg weight class, winning a gold medal. She set four world records in the event, and has the current world record in the clean & jerk and total for the 71 kg category.

== Major results ==
Year	Venue	Weight	Snatch (kg)				Clean & Jerk (kg)				Total	Rank
Year	Venue	Weight	1	2	3	Rank	1	2	3	Rank	Total	Rank
World Championships
2018	Ashgabat, Turkmenistan	71 kg	110	113	115	1st place, gold medalist(s)	140	148 WR	152 CWR	1st place, gold medalist(s)	267 CWR	1st place, gold medalist(s)
2019	Pattaya, Thailand	76 kg	113	~~118~~	118	2nd place, silver medalist(s)	~~145~~	145	153	1st place, gold medalist(s)	271	2nd place, silver medalist(s)
