= List of Cuban records in Olympic weightlifting =

The following are the national records in Olympic weightlifting in Cuba. Records are maintained in each weight class for the snatch lift, clean and jerk lift, and the total for both lifts by the Federación Cubana de Levantamiento de Pesas.

== Current records ==
=== Men ===
Event	Record	Athlete	Date	Meet	Place	Ref
60 kg
Snatch	121 kg	Otto Oñate	5 August 2026	CAC Games	Santo Domingo, Dominican Republic	
Clean & Jerk	158 kg	Otto Oñate	5 August 2026	CAC Games	Santo Domingo, Dominican Republic	
Total	279 kg	Otto Oñate	5 August 2026	CAC Games	Santo Domingo, Dominican Republic	
65 kg
Snatch	kg					
Clean & Jerk	kg					
Total	kg					
71 kg
Snatch	kg					
Clean & Jerk	kg					
Total	kg					
79 kg
Snatch	150 kg	Edisnel Corrales	6 August 2026	CAC Games	Santo Domingo, Dominican Republic	
Clean & Jerk	187 kg	Edisnel Corrales	6 August 2026	CAC Games	Santo Domingo, Dominican Republic	
Total	337 kg	Edisnel Corrales	6 August 2026	CAC Games	Santo Domingo, Dominican Republic	
88 kg
Snatch	kg					
Clean & Jerk	kg					
Total	kg					
94 kg
Snatch	147 kg	Yorelvis Machado	7 August 2026	CAC Games	Santo Domingo, Dominican Republic	
Clean & Jerk	193 kg	Yorelvis Machado	7 August 2026	CAC Games	Santo Domingo, Dominican Republic	
Total	340 kg	Yorelvis Machado	7 August 2026	CAC Games	Santo Domingo, Dominican Republic	
110 kg
Snatch	kg					
Clean & Jerk	kg					
Total	kg					
+110 kg
Snatch	kg					
Clean & Jerk	kg					
Total	kg					

=== Women ===
Event	Record	Athlete	Date	Meet	Place	Ref
48 kg
Snatch	82 kg	Ludia Montero	5 August 2026	CAC Games	Santo Domingo, Dominican Republic	
Clean & Jerk	94 kg	Ludia Montero	5 August 2026	CAC Games	Santo Domingo, Dominican Republic	
Total	176 kg	Ludia Montero	5 August 2026	CAC Games	Santo Domingo, Dominican Republic	
53 kg
Snatch						
Clean & Jerk						
Total						
58 kg
Snatch						
Clean & Jerk						
Total						
63 kg
Snatch	kg					
Clean & Jerk	kg					
Total	kg					
69 kg
Snatch						
Clean & Jerk						
Total						
77 kg
Snatch						
Clean & Jerk						
Total						
86 kg
Snatch						
Clean & Jerk						
Total						
+86 kg
Snatch	118 kg	Marifélix Sarría	18 July 2025	Pan American Championships	Cali, Colombia	
Clean & Jerk	162 kg	Marifélix Sarría	18 July 2025	Pan American Championships	Cali, Colombia	
Total	280 kg	Marifélix Sarría	18 July 2025	Pan American Championships	Cali, Colombia	

== Historical records ==
=== Men (2018–2025) ===
Event	Record	Athlete	Date	Meet	Place	Ref
55 kg
Snatch	105 kg	Raibet Marchado	24 June 2023	CAC Games	San Salvador, El Salvador	
Clean & Jerk	128 kg	Raibet Marchado	18 April 2023	Central American & Caribbean Championships	Santo Domingo, Dominican Republic	
Total	230 kg	Raibet Marchado	18 April 2023	Central American & Caribbean Championships	Santo Domingo, Dominican Republic	
61 kg
Snatch	126 kg	Arley Calderón	6 September 2023	World Championships	Riyadh, Saudi Arabia	
Clean & Jerk	165 kg	Arley Calderón	6 September 2023	World Championships	Riyadh, Saudi Arabia	
Total	291 kg	Arley Calderón	6 September 2023	World Championships	Riyadh, Saudi Arabia	
67 kg
Snatch	128 kg	Reydiel Herrera	10 June 2023	IWF Grand Prix	Havana, Cuba	
Clean & Jerk	164 kg	Arley Calderon	19 April 2023	Central American & Caribbean Championships	Santo Domingo, Dominican Republic	
Total	290 kg	Arley Calderon	19 April 2023	Central American & Caribbean Championships	Santo Domingo, Dominican Republic	
73 kg
Snatch	130 kg	Miguel Castro	21 April 2021	Pan American Championships	Santo Domingo, Dominican Republic	
Clean & Jerk	156 kg	Miguel Castro	21 April 2021	Pan American Championships	Santo Domingo, Dominican Republic	
Total	286 kg	Miguel Castro	21 April 2021	Pan American Championships	Santo Domingo, Dominican Republic	
81 kg
Snatch	138 kg	Edisnel Corrales	25 June 2023	CAC Games	San Salvador, El Salvador	
Clean & Jerk	173 kg	Edisnel Corrales	25 June 2023	CAC Games	San Salvador, El Salvador	
Total	311 kg	Edisnel Corrales	25 June 2023	CAC Games	San Salvador, El Salvador	
89 kg
Snatch	161 kg	Olfides Sáez	20 April 2023	Central American & Caribbean Championships	Santo Domingo, Dominican Republic	
Clean & Jerk	206 kg	Olfides Sáez	26 February 2024	Pan American Championships	Caracas, Venezuela	
Total	366 kg	Olfides Sáez	26 February 2024	Pan American Championships	Caracas, Venezuela	
96 kg
Snatch	160 kg	Olfides Sáez	29 July 2019	Pan American Games	Lima, Peru	
Clean & Jerk	206 kg	Olfides Sáez	29 July 2019	Pan American Games	Lima, Peru	
Total	366 kg	Olfides Sáez	29 July 2019	Pan American Games	Lima, Peru	
102 kg
Snatch	160 kg	Juan Zaldivar	14 June 2023	IWF Grand Prix	Havana, Cuba	
Clean & Jerk	200 kg	Juan Zaldivar	14 June 2023	IWF Grand Prix	Havana, Cuba	
Total	360 kg	Juan Zaldivar	14 June 2023	IWF Grand Prix	Havana, Cuba	
109 kg
Snatch	175 kg	Juan Columbié	29 July 2019	Pan American Games	Lima, Peru	
Clean & Jerk	209 kg	Juan Columbié	24 April 2021	Pan American Championships	Santo Domingo, Dominican Republic	
Total	380 kg	Juan Columbié	26 April 2019	Pan American Championships	Guatemala City, Guatemala	
+109 kg
Snatch	183 kg	Luis Lauret	27 April 2019	Pan American Championships	Guatemala City, Guatemala	
Clean & Jerk	218 kg	Luis Lauret	30 July 2019	Pan American Games	Lima, Peru	
Total	400 kg	Luis Lauret	27 April 2019	Pan American Championships	Guatemala City, Guatemala	

=== Women (2018–2025) ===
Event	Record	Athlete	Date	Meet	Place	Ref
45 kg
Snatch	76 kg	Ludia Montero	18 September 2019	World Championships	Pattaya, Thailand	
Clean & Jerk	75 kg	Thalia Castillo	10 June 2023	IWF Grand Prix	Havana, Cuba	
Total	135 kg	Thalia Castillo	10 June 2023	IWF Grand Prix	Havana, Cuba	
49 kg
Snatch	82 kg	Ludia Montero	27 July 2019	Pan American Games	Lima, Peru	
Clean & Jerk	96 kg	Ludia Montero	24 July 2021	Olympic Games	Tokyo, Japan	
Total	178 kg	Ludia Montero	24 July 2021	Olympic Games	Tokyo, Japan	
55 kg
Snatch	83 kg	Yailiana López	24 June 2023	CAC Games	San Salvador, El Salvador	
Clean & Jerk	96 kg	Yailiana López	24 June 2023	CAC Games	San Salvador, El Salvador	
Total	179 kg	Yailiana López	24 June 2023	CAC Games	San Salvador, El Salvador	
59 kg
Snatch	81 kg	Naveys Gonzalez	21 April 2021	Pan American Championships	Santo Domingo, Dominican Republic	
Clean & Jerk	101 kg	Naveys Gonzalez	21 April 2021	Pan American Championships	Santo Domingo, Dominican Republic	
Total	182 kg	Naveys Gonzalez	21 April 2021	Pan American Championships	Santo Domingo, Dominican Republic	
64 kg
Snatch	98 kg	Marina Rodríguez	27 July 2021	Olympic Games	Tokyo, Japan	
Clean & Jerk	126 kg	Marina Rodríguez	29 July 2019	Pan American Games	Lima, Peru	
Total	222 kg	Marina Rodríguez	29 July 2019	Pan American Games	Lima, Peru	
71 kg
Snatch	109 kg	Yeniuska Mirabal	7 April 2024	World Cup	Phuket, Thailand	
Clean & Jerk	129 kg	Yeniuska Mirabal	20 April 2023	Central American & Caribbean Championships	Santo Domingo, Dominican Republic	
Total	238 kg	Yeniuska Mirabal	7 April 2024	World Cup	Phuket, Thailand	
76 kg
Snatch	102 kg	Melisa Aguilera	29 July 2019	Pan American Games	Lima, Peru	
Clean & Jerk	128 kg	Yaneysi Merino	April 2019	Pan American Championships	Guatemala City, Guatemala	
Total	229 kg	Melisa Aguilera	29 July 2019	Pan American Games	Lima, Peru	
81 kg
Snatch	106 kg	Ayarney Medina	22 April 2023	Central American & Caribbean Championships	Santo Domingo, Dominican Republic	
Clean & Jerk	121 kg	Taila Cesar	April 2019	Pan American Championships	Guatemala City, Guatemala	
Total	214 kg	Taila Cesar	April 2019	Pan American Championships	Guatemala City, Guatemala	
87 kg
Snatch	103 kg	Elizabeth Reyes	26 June 2023	CAC Games	San Salvador, El Salvador	
Clean & Jerk	135 kg	Elizabeth Reyes	26 June 2023	CAC Games	San Salvador, El Salvador	
Total	238 kg	Elizabeth Reyes	26 June 2023	CAC Games	San Salvador, El Salvador	
+87 kg
Snatch	115 kg	Marifélix Sarría	27 September 2024	World Junior Championships	León, Spain	
Clean & Jerk	157 kg	Marifélix Sarría	15 December 2024	World Championships	Manama, Bahrain	
Total	270 kg	Marifélix Sarría	27 September 2024	World Junior Championships	León, Spain	

=== Men (1998–2018) ===
Event	Record	Athlete	Date	Meet	Place	Ref
-56 kg
Snatch	130 kg	William Vargas	7 May 1998	Manuel Suarez Tournament	Pinar del Río, Cuba	
Clean & Jerk	157 kg	Sergio Álvarez	4 September 2000	Manuel Suarez Tournament	Holguín, Cuba	
Total	285 kg	William Vargas	7 May 1998	Manuel Suarez Tournament	Pinar del Río, Cuba	
-62 kg
Snatch						
Clean & Jerk						
Total						
-69 kg
Snatch						
Clean & Jerk						
Total						
-77 kg
Snatch	160 kg	Pablo Lara	8 May 1998	Manuel Suarez Tournament	Pinar del Río, Cuba	
Clean & Jerk	205 kg	Idalberto Aranda	5 August 1999	Pan American Games	Winnipeg, Canada	
Total	356 kg	Ivan Cambar	24 November 2009	World Championships	Goyang, South Korea	
-85 kg
Snatch	169 kg	Jadier Valladares	15 August 2008	Olympic Games	Beijing, China	
Clean & Jerk	210 kg	Ernesto Quiroga	23 September 2000	Olympic Games	Sydney, Australia	
Total	375 kg	Ernesto Quiroga	23 September 2000	Olympic Games	Sydney, Australia	
-94 kg
Snatch	178 kg	Yoandry Hernández	17 August 2008	Olympic Games	Beijing, China	
Clean & Jerk	221 kg	Yoandry Hernández	17 July 2007	Pan American Games	Rio de Janeiro, Brasil	
Total						
-105 kg
Snatch						
Clean & Jerk	227 kg	Ernesto Montoya	10 May 1998	Manuel Suarez Tournament	Pinar del Río, Cuba	
Total						
+105 kg
Snatch						
Clean & Jerk						
Total						
