= List of Turkish records in Olympic weightlifting =

The following are the records of Turkey in Olympic weightlifting. Records are maintained in each weight class for the snatch lift, clean and jerk lift, and the total for both lifts by the Turkish Weightlifting Federation (Türkiye Halter Federasyonu).

== Current records ==
Key to tables: Awaiting ratification Not ratified or later rescinded by THF

=== Men ===
Event	Record	Athlete	Date	Meet	Place	Ref
60 kg
Snatch	120 kg	Yiğit Erdoğan	31 January 2026		Tokat, Turkey	
Snatch	124 kg	Yiğit Erdoğan	20 April 2026	European Championships	Batumi, Georgia	
Clean & Jerk	148 kg	Burak Aykun	28 October 2025 (Note: by official result source; 3 November 2025 by THF source, a typo)	European Junior Championships	Durrës, Albania	
Clean & Jerk	155 kg	Ramazan Efe Yılmaz	12 October 2026	European Junior Championships	Durrës, Albania	
Total	267 kg (Note: by official result source; 287 kg by THF source, a typo)	Burak Aykun	28 October 2025 (Note: by official result source; 3 November 2025 by THF source, a typo)	European Junior Championships	Durrës, Albania	
Total	269 kg	Yiğit Erdoğan	20 April 2026	European Championships	Batumi, Georgia	
Total	275 kg	Yiğit Erdoğan	12 October 2026	European Junior Championships	Durrës, Albania	
Total	277 kg	Yiğit Erdoğan	27 October 2026	World Championships	Ningbo, China	
65 kg
Snatch	145 kg	Muhammed Furkan Özbek	4 October 2025	World Championships	Førde, Norway	
Snatch	147 kg	Muhammed Furkan Özbek	28 October 2026	World Championships	Ningbo, China	
Clean & Jerk	180 kg	Muhammed Furkan Özbek	20 April 2026	European Championships	Batumi, Georgia	
Clean & Jerk	183 kg	Muhammed Furkan Özbek	28 October 2026	World Championships	Ningbo, China	
Total	324 kg	Muhammed Furkan Özbek	4 October 2025	World Championships	Førde, Norway	
Total	330 kg	Muhammed Furkan Özbek	28 October 2026	World Championships	Ningbo, China	
70 kg
Snatch	147 kg	Standard				
Clean & Jerk		Standard				
Total		Standard				
75 kg
Snatch	153 kg	Yusuf Fehmi Genç	1 September 2026	Mediterranean Games	San Giorgio Ionico, Italy	
Clean & Jerk		Standard				
Total		Standard				
85 kg
Snatch		Standard				
Clean & Jerk		Standard				
Total		Standard				
95 kg
Snatch		Standard				
Clean & Jerk		Standard				
Total		Standard				
110 kg
Snatch	165 kg	Standard				
Clean & Jerk	200 kg	Standard				
Total	365 kg	Standard				
+110 kg
Snatch	170 kg	Standard				
Clean & Jerk	211 kg	Muhammet Emin Burun	29 June 2025	Turkish Club Championships	Samsun, Turkey	
Total	380 kg	Standard				

=== Women ===
Event	Record	Athlete	Date	Meet	Place	Ref
49 kg
Snatch		Standard				
Clean & Jerk		Standard				
Total		Standard				
53 kg
Snatch	93 kg	Cansel Özkan	3 October 2025	World Championships	Førde, Norway	
Clean & Jerk	104 kg	Cansel Özkan	3 October 2025	World Championships	Førde, Norway	
Clean & Jerk	113 kg	Cansel Özkan	8 November 2025	Islamic Solidarity Games	Riyadh, Saudi Arabia	
Total	197 kg	Cansel Özkan	3 October 2025	World Championships	Førde, Norway	
Total	202 kg	Cansel Özkan	8 November 2025	Islamic Solidarity Games	Riyadh, Saudi Arabia	
57 kg
Snatch		Standard				
Clean & Jerk		Standard				
Total		Standard				
61 kg
Snatch		Standard				
Clean & Jerk		Standard				
Total		Standard				
69 kg
Snatch	105 kg	Nuray Güngör	10 November 2025	Islamic Solidarity Games	Riyadh, Saudi Arabia	
Clean & Jerk	128 kg	Nuray Güngör	10 November 2025	Islamic Solidarity Games	Riyadh, Saudi Arabia	
Total	233 kg	Nuray Güngör	10 November 2025	Islamic Solidarity Games	Riyadh, Saudi Arabia	
77 kg
Snatch	97 kg	Standard				
Snatch	104 kg	Tuğbanur Koz	2 September 2026	Mediterranean Games	San Giorgio Ionico, Italy	
Clean & Jerk	123 kg	Sara Yenigün	2 November 2025	European U23 Championships	Durrës, Albania	
Total	218 kg	Sara Yenigün	26 June 2025	Turkish Club Championships	Samsun, Turkey	
Total	221 kg	Tuğbanur Koz	2 September 2026	Mediterranean Games	San Giorgio Ionico, Italy	
86 kg
Snatch	107 kg	Büşra Çan	3 November 2025	European Junior Championships	Durrës, Albania	
Clean & Jerk	132 kg	Büşra Çan	3 November 2025	European Junior Championships	Durrës, Albania	
Total	239 kg	Büşra Çan	3 November 2025	European Junior Championships	Durrës, Albania	
+86 kg
Snatch	105 kg	Standard				
Snatch	110 kg	Fatmagül Çevik	11 October 2025	World Championships	Førde, Norway	
Snatch	111 kg	Fatmagül Çevik	3 November 2025	European Junior Championships	Durrës, Albania	
Clean & Jerk	132 kg	Standard				
Clean & Jerk	136 kg	Fatmagül Çevik	11 October 2025	World Championships	Førde, Norway	
Clean & Jerk	145 kg	Tuana Süren	26 April 2026	European Championships	Batumi, Georgia	
Total	237 kg	Standard				
Total	246 kg	Fatmagül Çevik	11 October 2025	World Championships	Førde, Norway	
Total	256 kg	Tuana Süren	26 April 2026	European Championships	Batumi, Georgia	

== Historical records ==
=== Men (2025–2026) ===
Event	Record	Athlete	Date	Meet	Place	Ref
71 kg
Snatch	151 kg	Yusuf Fehmi Genç	5 October 2025	World Championships	Førde, Norway	
Clean & Jerk	192 kg	Yusuf Fehmi Genç	5 October 2025	World Championships	Førde, Norway	
Total	343 kg	Yusuf Fehmi Genç	5 October 2025	World Championships	Førde, Norway	
79 kg
Snatch	156 kg	Kaan Kahriman	22 April 2026	European Championships	Batumi, Georgia	
Clean & Jerk	175 kg	Standard				
Clean & Jerk	178 kg	Kaan Kahriman	10 November 2025	Islamic Solidarity Games	Riyadh, Saudi Arabia	
Clean & Jerk	181 kg	Kaan Kahriman	22 April 2026	European Championships	Batumi, Georgia	
Total	320 kg	Standard				
Total	323 kg	Kaan Kahriman	1 November 2025	European U23 Championships	Durrës, Albania	
Total	337 kg	Kaan Kahriman	22 April 2026	European Championships	Batumi, Georgia	
88 kg
Snatch	151 kg	Kerem Kurnaz	1 November 2025 (Note: by official result source; 3 November 2025 by THF source, a typo)	European Junior Championships	Durrës, Albania	
Clean & Jerk	183 kg	Kerem Kurnaz	1 November 2025 (Note: by official result source; 3 November 2025 by THF source, a typo)	European Junior Championships	Durrës, Albania	
Total	334 kg	Kerem Kurnaz	1 November 2025 (Note: by official result source; 3 November 2025 by THF source, a typo)	European Junior Championships	Durrës, Albania	
94 kg
Snatch	161 kg	Hakan Şükrü Kurnaz	28 June 2025	Turkish Club Championships	Samsun, Turkey	
Snatch	165 kg	Hakan Şükrü Kurnaz	4 November 2025	European U23 Championships	Durrës, Albania	
Snatch	166 kg	Kaan Kahriman	24 April 2026	European Championships	Batumi, Georgia	
Clean & Jerk	191 kg	Hakan Şükrü Kurnaz	28 June 2025	Turkish Club Championships	Samsun, Turkey	
Total	352 kg	Hakan Şükrü Kurnaz	28 June 2025	Turkish Club Championships	Samsun, Turkey	

=== Men (2018–2025) ===
Event	Record	Athlete	Date	Meet	Place	Ref
55 kg
Snatch	116 kg	Muammer Şahin	7 December 2021	World Championships	Tashkent, Uzbekistan	
Clean & Jerk	135 kg	Muammer Şahin	6 April 2019	European Championships	Batumi, Georgia	
Total	247 kg	Muammer Şahin	6 April 2019	European Championships	Batumi, Georgia	
61 kg
Snatch	132 kg	Bünyamin Sezer	7 April 2019	European Championships	Batumi, Georgia	
Clean & Jerk	157 kg	Ferdi Hardal	4 April 2021	European Championships	Moscow, Russia	
Total	287 kg	Ferdi Hardal	4 April 2021	European Championships	Moscow, Russia	
67 kg
Snatch	150 kg	Daniyar İsmayilov	20 September 2019	World Championships	Pattaya, Thailand	
Clean & Jerk	182 kg	Yusuf Fehmi Genç	9 December 2022	World Championships	Bogotá, Colombia	
Total	323 kg	Muhammed Furkan Özbek	5 April 2021	European Championships	Moscow, Russia	
Total	327 kg	Yusuf Fehmi Genç	8 December 2024	World Championships	Manama, Bahrain	
73 kg
Snatch	160 kg	Daniyar İsmayilov	6 April 2021	European Championships	Moscow, Russia	
Clean & Jerk	194 kg	Yusuf Fehmi Genç	16 April 2025	European Championships	Chișinău, Moldova	
Total	348 kg	Yusuf Fehmi Genç	16 April 2025	European Championships	Chișinău, Moldova	
81 kg
Snatch	156 kg	Celil Erdoğdu	10 April 2019	European Championships	Batumi, Georgia	
Clean & Jerk	196 kg	Celil Erdoğdu	10 April 2019	European Championships	Batumi, Georgia	
Total	352 kg	Celil Erdoğdu	10 April 2019	European Championships	Batumi, Georgia	
89 kg
Snatch	156 kg	Hakan Şükrü Kurnaz	14 August 2022 (Note: by official result source; 13 July 2022 by federation source, a typo)	Islamic Solidarity Games	Konya, Turkey	
Clean & Jerk	191 kg	Ulaş Can Kurnaz	14 August 2022 (Note: by official result source; 13 July 2022 by federation source, a typo)	Islamic Solidarity Games	Konya, Turkey	
Total	342 kg	Ulaş Can Kurnaz	14 August 2022 (Note: by official result source; 13 July 2022 by federation source, a typo)	Islamic Solidarity Games	Konya, Turkey	
96 kg
Snatch	170 kg	Hakan Şükrü Kurnaz	21 April 2023	European Championships	Yerevan, Armenia	
Clean & Jerk	201 kg	İbrahim Arat	7 November 2018	World Championships	Ashgabat, Turkmenistan	
Total	361 kg	İbrahim Arat	7 November 2018	World Championships	Ashgabat, Turkmenistan	
102 kg
Snatch	160 kg	Resul Elvan	12 April 2019	European Championships	Batumi, Georgia	
Snatch	165 kg	İbrahim Arat	30 August 2022	Naim Süleymanoğlu Club Championship	Karaman, Turkey	
Clean & Jerk	198 kg	Resul Elvan	25 September 2019	World Championships	Pattaya, Thailand	
Clean & Jerk	201 kg	İbrahim Arat	30 August 2022	Naim Süleymanoğlu Club Championship	Karaman, Turkey	
Total	356 kg	Resul Elvan	12 April 2019	European Championships	Batumi, Georgia	
Total	366 kg	İbrahim Arat	30 August 2022	Naim Süleymanoğlu Club Championship	Karaman, Turkey	
109 kg
Snatch	168 kg	Muhammed Emin Burun	26 September 2024	World Junior Championships	León, Spain	
Clean & Jerk	207 kg	Resul Elvan	2 March 2019	Fajr Cup	Tehran, Iran	
Clean & Jerk	208 kg	İbrahim Arat	17 November 2022	Naim Süleymanoğlu Tournament	Ankara, Turkey	
Total	369 kg	Muhammed Emin Burun	2 November 2024	European Junior Championships	Raszyn, Poland	
Total	375 kg	İbrahim Arat	17 November 2022	Naim Süleymanoğlu Tournament	Ankara, Turkey	
Total	375 kg	Onur Demirci	19 February 2024	European Championships	Sofia, Bulgaria	
+109 kg
Snatch	170 kg	Yıldıray Kaplan	26 October 2019	European Junior Championships	Bucharest, Romania	
Clean & Jerk	212 kg	Ali Oflaz	3 November 2024	European Junior Championships	Raszyn, Poland	
Total	381 kg	Yıldıray Kaplan	26 October 2019	European Junior Championships	Bucharest, Romania	

=== Men (1998–2018) ===
Event	Record	Athlete	Date	Meet	Place	Ref
-56 kg
Snatch	138 kg	Halil Mutlu	4 November 2001	World Championships	Antalya, Turkey	
Clean & Jerk	168 kg	Halil Mutlu	24 April 2001	European Championships	Trenčín, Slovakia	
Total	305 kg	Halil Mutlu	16 September 2000	Olympic Games	Sydney, Australia	
-62 kg
Snatch	147.5 kg	Halil Mutlu	15 November 2003	World Championships	Vancouver, Canada	
Clean & Jerk	175 kg	Halil Mutlu	16 April 2003	European Championships	Loutraki, Greece	
Total	322.5 kg	Halil Mutlu	17 December 2003	World Championships	Vancouver, Canada	
-69 kg
Snatch	163 kg	Daniyar İsmayilov	9 August 2016	Olympic Games	Rio de Janeiro, Brazil	
Clean & Jerk	190 kg	Ekrem Celil	21 April 2004	European Championships	Kyiv, Ukraine	
Total	351 kg	Daniyar İsmayilov	9 August 2016	Olympic Games	Rio de Janeiro, Brazil	
-77 kg
Snatch	172.5 kg	Taner Sağır	19 August 2004	Olympic Games	Athens, Greece	
Clean & Jerk	202.5 kg	Taner Sağır	19 August 2004	Olympic Games	Athens, Greece	
Total	375 kg	Taner Sağır	19 August 2004	Olympic Games	Athens, Greece	
-85 kg
Snatch	175 kg	İzzet İnce	22 April 2004	European Championships	Kyiv, Ukraine	
Clean & Jerk	210.5 kg	Mehmet Yılmaz	2 March 2001		Çorum, Turkey	
Total	381 kg	Mehmet Yılmaz	2 March 2001		Çorum, Turkey	
-94 kg
Snatch	180 kg	Hakan Yılmaz	20 November 2003	World Championships	Vancouver, Canada	
Clean & Jerk	220 kg	Bünyamin Sudaş	27 November 1999	World Championships	Athens, Greece	
Total	400 kg	Hakan Yılmaz	20 November 2003	World Championships	Vancouver, Canada	
-105 kg
Snatch	185.5 kg	Bünyamin Sudaş	3 August 2003		Çanakkale, Turkey	
Clean & Jerk	235 kg	Bünyamin Sudaş	10 November 2001	World Championships	Antalya, Turkey	
Total	420 kg	Bünyamin Sudaş	10 November 2001	World Championships	Antalya, Turkey	
+105 kg
Snatch	185 kg	Abdulaziz Alpak	7 September 2001		Tunis, Tunisia	
Clean & Jerk	237.5 kg	Bünyamin Sudaş	26 March 2005		Konya, Turkey	
Total	417.5 kg	Bünyamin Sudaş	26 March 2005		Konya, Turkey	

=== Women (2025–2026) ===
Event	Record	Athlete	Date	Meet	Place	Ref
48 kg
Snatch	78 kg	Ezgi Kılıç	28 October 2025	European Junior Championships	Durrës, Albania	
Clean & Jerk	100 kg	Gamze Altun	28 October 2025	European U23 Championships	Durrës, Albania	
Total	174 kg	Ezgi Kılıç	28 October 2025	European Junior Championships	Durrës, Albania	
58 kg
Snatch	86 kg	Standard				
Clean & Jerk	108 kg	Standard				
Total	194 kg	Standard				
63 kg
Snatch	102 kg	Aysel Özkan	5 October 2025	World Championships	Førde, Norway	
Clean & Jerk	120 kg	Aysel Özkan	5 October 2025	World Championships	Førde, Norway	
Total	222 kg	Aysel Özkan	5 October 2025	World Championships	Førde, Norway	

=== Women (2018–2025) ===
Event	Record	Athlete	Date	Meet	Place	Ref
45 kg
Snatch	77 kg	Şaziye Erdoğan	18 September 2019	World Championships	Pattaya, Thailand	
Clean & Jerk	95 kg	Şaziye Erdoğan	9 February 2020	International Solidarity Championships	Tashkent, Uzbekistan	
Clean & Jerk	96 kg	Gamze Altun	6 December 2024	World Championships	Manama, Bahrain	
Total	172 kg	Şaziye Erdoğan	9 February 2020	International Solidarity Championships	Tashkent, Uzbekistan	
49 kg
Snatch	81 kg	Şaziye Erdoğan	2 November 2018	World Championships	Ashgabat, Turkmenistan	
Clean & Jerk	97 kg	Şaziye Erdoğan	2 November 2018	World Championships	Ashgabat, Turkmenistan	
Total	178 kg	Şaziye Erdoğan	2 November 2018	World Championships	Ashgabat, Turkmenistan	
55 kg
Snatch	85 kg	Burcu Alıcı	14 February 2024	European Championships	Sofia, Bulgaria	
Clean & Jerk	110 kg	Sümeyye Kentli	4 April 2021	European Championships	Moscow, Russia	
Total	193 kg	Sümeyye Kentli	4 April 2021	European Championships	Moscow, Russia	
59 kg
Snatch	92 kg	Cansel Özkan	26 September 2021	European Junior Championships	Rovaniemi, Finland	
Clean & Jerk	116 kg	Ayşegül Çakın	20 October 2019	European Junior Championships	Bucharest, Romania	
Total	203 kg	Ayşegül Çakın	20 October 2019	European Junior Championships	Bucharest, Romania	
Total	205 kg	Ayşegül Çakın	16 November 2019	Naim Süleymanoğlu Tournament	Gaziantep, Turkey	
64 kg
Snatch	101 kg	Nuray Levent	26 May 2021	World Junior Championships (Note: Levent participated out of competition)	Tashkent, Uzbekistan	
Clean & Jerk	121 kg	Nuray Güngör	13 August 2022	Islamic Solidarity Games	Konya, Turkey	
Total	220 kg	Nuray Levent	27 July 2021	Olympic Games	Tokyo, Japan	
71 kg
Snatch	101 kg	Aysel Özkan	27 May 2021	World Junior Championships	Tashkent, Uzbekistan	
Clean & Jerk	121 kg	Berfin Altun	7 April 2021	European Championships	Moscow, Russia	
Clean & Jerk	122 kg	Nuray Güngör	3 July 2022	Mediterranean Games	Oran, Algeria	
Total	218 kg	Medine Saime Balaban	12 September 2024		Konya, Turkey	
76 kg
Snatch	101 kg	Dilara Uçan	29 September 2021	European Junior Championships	Rovaniemi, Finland	
Snatch	103 kg	Dilara Narin	14 September 2023	World Championships	Riyadh, Saudi Arabia	
Clean & Jerk	130 kg	Dilara Narin	23 October 2019	European Junior Championships	Bucharest, Romania	
Total	228 kg	Dilara Uçan	29 September 2021	European Junior Championships	Rovaniemi, Finland	
Total	233 kg	Dilara Narin	14 September 2023	World Championships	Riyadh, Saudi Arabia	
81 kg
Snatch	101 kg	Dilara Narin	21 April 2023	European Championships	Yerevan, Armenia	
Clean & Jerk	134 kg	Dilara Narin	21 April 2023	European Championships	Yerevan, Armenia	
Total	235 kg	Dilara Narin	21 April 2023	European Championships	Yerevan, Armenia	
87 kg
Snatch	104 kg	Büşra Çan	26 September 2024	World Junior Championships	León, Spain	
Clean & Jerk	129 kg	Büşra Çan	26 September 2024	World Junior Championships	León, Spain	
Clean & Jerk	130 kg	Dilara Narin	17 November 2022	Naim Süleymanoğlu Tournament	Ankara, Turkey	
Total	233 kg	Büşra Çan	26 September 2024	World Junior Championships	León, Spain	
+87 kg
Snatch	110 kg	Melike Günal	23 April 2023	European Championships	Yerevan, Armenia	
Clean & Jerk	137 kg	Tuana Süren	16 September 2023	World Championships	Riyadh, Saudi Arabia	
Total	243 kg	Melike Günal	11 April 2021	European Championships	Moscow, Russia	

=== Women (1998–2018) ===
Event	Record	Athlete	Date	Meet	Place	Ref
48 kg
Snatch	97.5 kg	Nurcan Taylan	14 August 2004	Olympic Games	Athens, Greece	
Clean & Jerk	121 kg	Nurcan Taylan	17 September 2010	World Championships	Antalya, Turkey	
Total	214 kg	Nurcan Taylan	17 September 2010	World Championships	Antalya, Turkey	
53 kg
Snatch	95.5 kg	Nurcan Taylan	April 2004	European Championships	Kyiv, Ukraine	
Clean & Jerk	126 kg	Aylin Daşdelen	6 November 2011	World Championships	Paris, France	
Total	219 kg	Aylin Daşdelen	6 November 2011	World Championships	Paris, France	
58 kg
Snatch	100 kg	Aylin Daşdelen	16 August 2004	Olympic Games	Athens, Greece	
Clean & Jerk	125 kg	Aylin Daşdelen	16 August 2004	Olympic Games	Athens, Greece	
Total	225 kg	Aylin Daşdelen	16 August 2004	Olympic Games	Athens, Greece	
63 kg
Snatch	108 kg	Sibel Şimşek	6 April 2009	European Championships	Bucharest, Romania	
Clean & Jerk	135 kg	Sibel Şimşek	25 November 2009	World Championships	Goyang, South Korea	
Total	243 kg	Sibel Şimşek	25 November 2009	World Championships	Goyang, South Korea	
69 kg
Snatch	112.5 kg	Sibel Şimşek	21 April 2004	European Championships	Kyiv, Ukraine	
Clean & Jerk	135 kg	Sibel Şimşek	21 April 2004	European Championships	Kyiv, Ukraine	
Total	247.5 kg	Sibel Şimşek	21 April 2004	European Championships	Kyiv, Ukraine	
75 kg
Snatch	120 kg	Sibel Şimşek	2 September 2005		İzmit, Turkey	
Clean & Jerk	137 kg	Sibel Şimşek	2 September 2005		İzmit, Turkey	
Total	257 kg	Sibel Şimşek	2 September 2005		İzmit, Turkey	
90 kg
Snatch	91 kg	Tuğçe Boynueğri	3 March 2018	Turkish Club Championships	Gaziantep, Turkey	
Clean & Jerk	110 kg	Ayşe Seven	15 May 2017	Islamic Solidarity Games	Baku, Azerbaijan	
Total	200 kg	Tuğçe Boynueğri	3 March 2018	Turkish Club Championships	Gaziantep, Turkey	
+90 kg
Snatch	92 kg	Melike Günal	3 March 2018	Turkish Club Championships	Gaziantep, Turkey	
Clean & Jerk	113 kg	Melike Günal	3 March 2018	Turkish Club Championships	Gaziantep, Turkey	
Total	205 kg	Melike Günal	3 March 2018	Turkish Club Championships	Gaziantep, Turkey	
