= List of Mexican records in Olympic weightlifting =

The following are the national records in Olympic weightlifting in Mexico. Records are maintained in each weight class for the snatch lift, clean and jerk lift, and the total for both lifts by the Federación Mexicana de Levantamiento de Pesas (FMLP).

== Current records ==
=== Men ===
Event	Record	Athlete	Date	Meet	Place	Ref
60 kg
Snatch	108 kg	Wilfredo Alemán	16 September 2025	Pan American Junior Championships	Guayaquil, Ecuador	
Clean & Jerk	145 kg	José Poox	August 2025	Mexican Championships	Campeche, Mexico	
Total	251 kg	José Poox	August 2025	Mexican Championships	Campeche, Mexico	
65 kg
Snatch	125 kg	Herseleid Carrazco	14 July 2025	Pan American Championships	Cali, Colombia	
Clean & Jerk	160 kg	Herseleid Carrazco	14 July 2025	Pan American Championships	Cali, Colombia	
Total	285 kg	Herseleid Carrazco	14 July 2025	Pan American Championships	Cali, Colombia	
71 kg
Snatch	150 kg	Jorge Cárdenas	6 August 2026	CAC Games	Santo Domingo, Dominican Republic	
Clean & Jerk	167 kg	Jorge Cárdenas	6 August 2026	CAC Games	Santo Domingo, Dominican Republic	
Total	317 kg	Jorge Cárdenas	6 August 2026	CAC Games	Santo Domingo, Dominican Republic	
79 kg
Snatch	140 kg	Juniel Muñoz	15 July 2025	Pan American Championships	Cali, Colombia	
Clean & Jerk	167 kg	Juniel Muñoz	August 2025	Mexican Championships	Campeche, Mexico	
Total	307 kg	Juniel Muñoz	August 2025	Mexican Championships	Campeche, Mexico	
88 kg
Snatch	151 kg	José Mantilla	10 July 2026	World Youth Championships	Cali, Colombia	
Clean & Jerk	191 kg	Mauricio Canul	7 August 2026	CAC Games	Santo Domingo, Dominican Republic	
Total	335 kg	José Mantilla	10 July 2026	World Youth Championships	Cali, Colombia	
94 kg
Snatch	156 kg	Antonio Govea	8 October 2025	World Championships	Førde, Norway	
Clean & Jerk	196 kg	Jonathan Ramos	7 August 2026	CAC Games	Santo Domingo, Dominican Republic	
Total	351 kg	Jonathan Ramos	7 August 2026	CAC Games	Santo Domingo, Dominican Republic	
110 kg
Snatch	172 kg	Josué Medina	8 August 2026	CAC Games	Santo Domingo, Dominican Republic	
Clean & Jerk	206 kg	Josué Medina	8 August 2026	CAC Games	Santo Domingo, Dominican Republic	
Total	378 kg	Josué Medina	8 August 2026	CAC Games	Santo Domingo, Dominican Republic	
+110 kg
Snatch	171 kg	Karim Saadi	8 August 2026	CAC Games	Santo Domingo, Dominican Republic	
Clean & Jerk	206 kg	Karim Saadi	8 August 2026	CAC Games	Santo Domingo, Dominican Republic	
Total	377 kg	Karim Saadi	8 August 2026	CAC Games	Santo Domingo, Dominican Republic	

=== Women ===
Event	Record	Athlete	Date	Meet	Place	Ref
48 kg
Snatch	74 kg	Jeannis Ramírez	13 July 2025	Pan American Championships	Cali, Colombia	
Clean & Jerk	97 kg	Jeannis Ramírez	13 July 2025	Pan American Championships	Cali, Colombia	
Total	171 kg	Jeannis Ramírez	13 July 2025	Pan American Championships	Cali, Colombia	
53 kg
Snatch	88 kg	Andrea de la Herrán	5 August 2026	CAC Games	Santo Domingo, Dominican Republic	
Clean & Jerk	110 kg	Andrea de la Herrán	5 August 2026	CAC Games	Santo Domingo, Dominican Republic	
Total	198 kg	Andrea de la Herrán	5 August 2026	CAC Games	Santo Domingo, Dominican Republic	
58 kg
Snatch	92 kg	Joseline López	3 May 2026	World Junior Championships	Ismailia, Egypt	
Clean & Jerk	121 kg	Joseline López	3 May 2026	World Junior Championships	Ismailia, Egypt	
Total	213 kg	Joseline López	3 May 2026	World Junior Championships	Ismailia, Egypt	
63 kg
Snatch	99 kg	Janeth Gómez	15 July 2025	Pan American Championships	Cali, Colombia	
Clean & Jerk	125 kg	Janeth Gómez	5 October 2025	World Championships	Førde, Norway	
Total	223 kg	Janeth Gómez	5 October 2025	World Championships	Førde, Norway	
69 kg
Snatch	93 kg	Diana García	16 July 2025	Pan American Championships	Cali, Colombia	
Clean & Jerk	123 kg	Diana García	16 July 2025	Pan American Championships	Cali, Colombia	
Total	216 kg	Diana García	16 July 2025	Pan American Championships	Cali, Colombia	
77 kg
Snatch	106 kg	Aremi Fuentes	16 July 2025	Pan American Championships	Cali, Colombia	
Clean & Jerk	135 kg	Jessica Jarquín	8 October 2025	World Championships	Førde, Norway	
Total	239 kg	Jessica Jarquín	8 October 2025	World Championships	Førde, Norway	
86 kg
Snatch	110 kg	Emmy González	17 July 2025	Pan American Championships	Cali, Colombia	
Clean & Jerk	133 kg	Emmy González	August 2025	Mexican Championships	Campeche, Mexico	
Total	240 kg	Emmy González	17 July 2025	Pan American Championships	Cali, Colombia	
+86 kg
Snatch	113 kg	Adbeel Rodríguez	November 2025		San Luis Potosí, Mexico	
Clean & Jerk	140 kg	Adbeel Rodríguez	November 2025		San Luis Potosí, Mexico	
Total	253 kg	Adbeel Rodríguez	November 2025		San Luis Potosí, Mexico	

== Historical records ==
=== Men (2018–2025) ===
Event	Record	Athlete	Date	Meet	Place	Ref
55 kg
Snatch	104 kg	José Poox	18 April 2023	Central American & Caribbean Championships	Santo Domingo, Dominican Republic	
Clean & Jerk	137 kg	Juan Barco	24 June 2023	CAC Games	San Salvador, El Salvador	
Total	237 kg	Juan Barco	24 June 2023	CAC Games	San Salvador, El Salvador	
61 kg
Snatch	123 kg	Antonio Vázquez	27 July 2019	Pan American Games	Lima, Peru	
Clean & Jerk	164 kg	Antonio Vázquez	April 2019	Pan American Championships	Guatemala City, Guatemala	
Total	286 kg	Antonio Vázquez	27 July 2019	Pan American Games	Lima, Peru	
67 kg
Snatch	142 kg	Jonathan Muñoz	20 April 2021	Pan American Championships	Santo Domingo, Dominican Republic	
Clean & Jerk	170 kg	Jonathan Munoz	April 2019	Pan American Championships	Guatemala City, Guatemala	
Total	310 kg	Jonathan Muñoz	20 April 2021	Pan American Championships	Santo Domingo, Dominican Republic	
73 kg
Snatch	149 kg	Jorge Cárdenas	21 April 2021	Pan American Championships	Santo Domingo, Dominican Republic	
Clean & Jerk	175 kg	Jorge Cárdenas	28 July 2021	Olympic Games	Tokyo, Japan	
Total	320 kg	Jorge Cárdenas	28 July 2021	Olympic Games	Tokyo, Japan	
81 kg
Snatch	131 kg	Josue Aguilar	20 April 2023	Central American & Caribbean Championships	Santo Domingo, Dominican Republic	
Clean & Jerk	170 kg	Josue Aguilar	21 April 2021	Pan American Championships	Santo Domingo, Dominican Republic	
Total	301 kg	Josue Aguilar	20 April 2023	Central American & Caribbean Championships	Santo Domingo, Dominican Republic	
89 kg
Snatch	150 kg	Juniel Muñoz	10 September 2023	World Championships	Riyadh, Saudi Arabia	
Clean & Jerk	187 kg	Mauricio Canul	10 September 2023	World Championships	Riyadh, Saudi Arabia	
Total	332 kg	Mauricio Canul	20 April 2023	Central American & Caribbean Championships	Santo Domingo, Dominican Republic	
96 kg
Snatch	155 kg	José López	13 September 2023	World Championships	Riyadh, Saudi Arabia	
Clean & Jerk	196 kg	José López	26 June 2023	CAC Games	San Salvador, El Salvador	
Total	348 kg	José López	26 June 2023	CAC Games	San Salvador, El Salvador	
102 kg
Snatch	161 kg	Antonio Govea	21 April 2023	Central American & Caribbean Championships	Santo Domingo, Dominican Republic	
Clean & Jerk	196 kg	José López	23 April 2021	Pan American Championships	Santo Domingo, Dominican Republic	
Total	357 kg	Antonio Govea	21 April 2023	Central American & Caribbean Championships	Santo Domingo, Dominican Republic	
109 kg
Snatch	168 kg	Josue Medina	21 April 2023	Central American & Caribbean Championships	Santo Domingo, Dominican Republic	
Clean & Jerk	206 kg	Josue Medina	21 April 2023	Central American & Caribbean Championships	Santo Domingo, Dominican Republic	
Total	374 kg	Josue Medina	21 April 2023	Central American & Caribbean Championships	Santo Domingo, Dominican Republic	
+109 kg
Snatch	177 kg	Raúl Manríquez	November 2021	Pan American Championships	Guayaquil, Ecuador	
Clean & Jerk	218 kg	Raúl Manríquez	30 July 2019	Pan American Games	Lima, Peru	
Total	393 kg	Raúl Manríquez	30 July 2019	Pan American Games	Lima, Peru	

=== Men (1998–2018) ===
Event	Record	Athlete	Date	Meet	Place	Ref
-56 kg
Snatch						
Clean & Jerk						
Total						
-62 kg
Snatch						
Clean & Jerk						
Total						
-69 kg
Snatch	148 kg	Bredni Roque	7 June 2016	Pan American Championships	Cartagena, Colombia	
Clean & Jerk	188 kg	Bredni Roque	7 June 2016	Pan American Championships	Cartagena, Colombia	
Total	336 kg	Bredni Roque	7 June 2016	Pan American Championships	Cartagena, Colombia	
-77 kg
Snatch						
Clean & Jerk						
Total						
-85 kg
Snatch						
Clean & Jerk						
Total						
-94 kg
Snatch						
Clean & Jerk						
Total						
-105 kg
Snatch						
Clean & Jerk						
Total						
+105 kg
Snatch						
Clean & Jerk						
Total						

=== Women (2018–2025) ===
Event	Record	Athlete	Date	Meet	Place	Ref
45 kg
Snatch	70 kg	Diana Chay	November 2021	Pan American Championships	Guayaquil, Ecuador	
Clean & Jerk	92 kg	Maria Barco	18 April 2023	Central American & Caribbean Championships	Santo Domingo, Dominican Republic	
Total	157 kg	Diana Chay	November 2021	Pan American Championships	Guayaquil, Ecuador	
49 kg
Snatch	87 kg	Ana Lopez	1 April 2024	World Cup	Phuket, Thailand	
Clean & Jerk	103 kg	Yesica Hernández	19 October 2021	Pan American Junior Championships	Guadalajara, Mexico	
Total	188 kg	Ana Lopez	24 February 2024	Pan American Championships	Caracas, Venezuela	
55 kg
Snatch	92 kg	Ana López	24 April 2019	Pan American Championships	Guatemala City, Guatemala	
Clean & Jerk	111 kg	Ana López	28 July 2019	Pan American Games	Lima, Peru	
Total	202 kg	Ana López	24 April 2019	Pan American Championships	Guatemala City, Guatemala	
59 kg
Snatch	100 kg	Janeth Gómez	25 February 2024	Pan American Championships	Caracas, Venezuela	
Clean & Jerk	125 kg	Janeth Gómez	10 June 2023	IWF Grand Prix	Havana, Cuba	
Total	223 kg	Janeth Gómez	10 June 2023	IWF Grand Prix	Havana, Cuba	
64 kg
Snatch	98 kg	Eva Gurrola	November 2021	Pan American Championships	Guayaquil, Ecuador	
Clean & Jerk	124 kg	Karla Ortiz	20 April 2023	Central American & Caribbean Championships	Santo Domingo, Dominican Republic	
Total	222 kg	Karla Ortiz	25 June 2023	CAC Games	San Salvador, El Salvador	
71 kg
Snatch	101 kg	Jessica Jarquin	20 April 2023	Central American & Caribbean Championships	Santo Domingo, Dominican Republic	
Clean & Jerk	129 kg	Ana Torres	November 2021	Pan American Championships	Guayaquil, Ecuador	
Total	229 kg	Jessica Jarquin	20 April 2023	Central American & Caribbean Championships	Santo Domingo, Dominican Republic	
76 kg
Snatch	110 kg	Aremi Fuentes	29 July 2019	Pan American Games	Lima, Peru	
Clean & Jerk	140 kg	Aremi Fuentes	29 July 2019	Pan American Games	Lima, Peru	
Total	250 kg	Aremi Fuentes	29 July 2019	Pan American Games	Lima, Peru	
81 kg
Snatch	109 kg	Lizbeth Nolasco	27 February 2024	Pan American Championships	Caracas, Venezuela	
Clean & Jerk	131 kg	Anacarmen Torrez	April 2019	Pan American Championships	Guatemala City, Guatemala	
Total	240 kg	Lizbeth Nolasco	27 February 2024	Pan American Championships	Caracas, Venezuela	
87 kg
Snatch	109 kg	Mairyn Hernández	5 May 2025	Junior World Championships	Lima, Peru	
Clean & Jerk	135 kg	Ana Torres	30 July 2019	Pan American Games	Lima, Peru	
Total	244 kg	Mairyn Hernández	5 May 2025	Junior World Championships	Lima, Peru	
+87 kg
Snatch	120 kg	Tania Mascorro	April 2019	Pan American Championships	Guatemala City, Guatemala	
Clean & Jerk	145 kg	Abdeel Rodriguez	22 April 2023	Central American & Caribbean Championships	Santo Domingo, Dominican Republic	
Total	264 kg	Tania Mascorro	April 2019	Pan American Championships	Guatemala City, Guatemala	

=== Women (1998–2018) ===
Event	Record	Athlete	Date	Meet	Place	Ref
48 kg
Snatch						
Clean & Jerk						
Total						
53 kg
Snatch						
Clean & Jerk						
Total						
58 kg
Snatch						
Clean & Jerk						
Total						
63 kg
Snatch						
Clean & Jerk						
Total						
69 kg
Snatch						
Clean & Jerk						
Total						
75 kg
Snatch	105 kg	Aremi Fuentes	3 December 2017	World Championships	Anaheim, United States	
Clean & Jerk	131 kg	Aremi Fuentes	3 December 2017	World Championships	Anaheim, United States	
Total	236 kg	Aremi Fuentes	3 December 2017	World Championships	Anaheim, United States	
90 kg
Snatch	105 kg	Aremi Fuentes	25 August 2017	Universiade	New Taipei City, Taiwan	
Clean & Jerk	127 kg	Aremi Fuentes	25 August 2017	Universiade	New Taipei City, Taiwan	
Total	232 kg	Aremi Fuentes	25 August 2017	Universiade	New Taipei City, Taiwan	
+90 kg
Snatch	117 kg	Tania Mascorro	September 2017	Central American and Caribbean Championships	Guatemala City, Guatemala	
Clean & Jerk	146 kg	Tania Mascorro	September 2017	Central American and Caribbean Championships	Guatemala City, Guatemala	
Total	263 kg	Tania Mascorro	September 2017	Central American and Caribbean Championships	Guatemala City, Guatemala	
