= List of Sri Lankan records in Olympic weightlifting =

The following are the national records in Olympic weightlifting in Sri Lanka. Records are maintained in each weight class for the snatch lift, clean and jerk lift, and the total for both lifts by the Sri Lanka Weightlifting Federation.

== Current records ==
=== Men ===
Event	Record	Athlete	Date	Meet	Place	Ref
60 kg
Snatch	106 kg	Supun Dilhara Somathilaka	24 September 2026	Asian Games	Nagoya, Japan	
Clean & Jerk	kg					
Total	kg					
65 kg
Snatch	kg					
Clean & Jerk	kg					
Total	kg					

=== Women ===
Event	Record	Athlete	Date	Meet	Place	Ref
49 kg
Snatch						
Clean & Jerk						
Total						
53 kg
Snatch						
Clean & Jerk						
Total						
57 kg
Snatch						
Clean & Jerk						
Total						
61 kg
Snatch						
Clean & Jerk						
Total						
69 kg
Snatch						
Clean & Jerk						
Total						
77 kg
Snatch						
Clean & Jerk						
Total						
86 kg
Snatch						
Clean & Jerk						
Total						
+86 kg
Snatch						
Clean & Jerk						
Total						

== Historical records ==
=== Men (2018-2025) ===
Event	Record	Athlete	Date	Meet	Place	Ref
55 kg
Snatch	112 kg	Dilanka Yodage	4 December 2023	IWF Grand Prix	Doha, Qatar	
Clean & Jerk	137 kg	Dilanka Yodage	18 April 2021	Asian Championships	Tashkent, Uzbekistan	
Total	247 kg	Dilanka Yodage	1 April 2024	World Cup	Phuket, Thailand	
61 kg
Snatch	122 kg	Don Karolislage Thilankawiraj Kumara Palagasinghe	20 April 2019	Asian Championships	Ningbo, China	
Clean & Jerk	155 kg	Don Karolislage Thilankawiraj Kumara Palagasinghe	20 April 2019	Asian Championships	Ningbo, China	
Total	277 kg	Don Karolislage Thilankawiraj Kumara Palagasinghe	20 April 2019	Asian Championships	Ningbo, China	
67 kg
Snatch	119 kg	J.A.C. Lackmal	6 December 2019	South Asian Games	Pokhara, Nepal	
Clean & Jerk	144 kg	J.A.C. Lackmal	6 December 2019	South Asian Games	Pokhara, Nepal	
Total	263 kg	J.A.C. Lackmal	6 December 2019	South Asian Games	Pokhara, Nepal	
73 kg
Snatch	135 kg	Indika Dissanayake	10 December 2021	World Championships	Tashkent, Uzbekistan	
Clean & Jerk	161 kg	Dissanayake DMC Indika	22 April 2019	Asian Championships	Ningbo, China	
Total	291 kg	Dissanayake DMC Indika	22 April 2019	Asian Championships	Ningbo, China	
81 kg
Snatch	134 kg	Chinthana Vidanage	11 December 2021	World Championships	Tashkent, Uzbekistan	
Clean & Jerk	166 kg	Chinthana Vidanage	12 December 2021	World Championships	Tashkent, Uzbekistan	
Total	300 kg	Chinthana Vidanage	12 December 2021	World Championships	Tashkent, Uzbekistan	
89 kg
Snatch						
Clean & Jerk						
Total						
96 kg
Snatch	130 kg	Chanaka Peters	13 December 2021	World Championships	Tashkent, Uzbekistan	
Clean & Jerk	165 kg	Chanaka Peters	13 December 2021	World Championships	Tashkent, Uzbekistan	
Total	295 kg	Chanaka Peters	13 December 2021	World Championships	Tashkent, Uzbekistan	
102 kg
Snatch						
Clean & Jerk						
Total						
109 kg
Snatch						
Clean & Jerk						
Total						
+109 kg
Snatch	140 kg	Charuka W.P.U.	8 December 2019	South Asian Games	Pokhara, Nepal	
Clean & Jerk	180 kg	Charuka W.P.U.	8 December 2019	South Asian Games	Pokhara, Nepal	
Total	320 kg	Charuka W.P.U.	8 December 2019	South Asian Games	Pokhara, Nepal	

=== Men (2018-2025) ===
Event	Record	Athlete	Date	Meet	Place	Ref
45 kg
Snatch	61 kg	Srimali Divisekara Mudiyanselage	4 September 2023	World Championships	Riyadh, Saudi Arabia	
Clean & Jerk	83 kg	Srimali Divisekara Mudiyanselage	4 September 2023	World Championships	Riyadh, Saudi Arabia	
Total	144 kg	Srimali Divisekara Mudiyanselage	4 September 2023	World Championships	Riyadh, Saudi Arabia	
49 kg
Snatch	76 kg	Dinusha Bomiriyage	1 April 2024	World Cup	Phuket, Thailand	
Clean & Jerk	89 kg	Dinusha Bomiriyage	4 December 2023	IWF Grand Prix II	Doha, Qatar	
Total	164 kg	Dinusha Bomiriyage	4 December 2023	IWF Grand Prix II	Doha, Qatar	
55 kg
Snatch	78 kg	W. C. Mendis Warnakulasuriya	5 December 2019	South Asian Games	Pokhara, Nepal	
Clean and Jerk	95 kg	W. C. Mendis Warnakulasuriya	22 April 2019	Asian Championships	Ningbo, China	
Total	170 kg	W. C. Mendis Warnakulasuriya	22 April 2019	Asian Championships	Ningbo, China	
59 kg
Snatch	74 kg	N. S. Rajapaksa	11 December 2021	World Championships	Tashkent, Uzbekistan	
Clean & Jerk	91 kg	Rajapaksha R.M.N.S.	5 December 2019	South Asian Games	Pokhara, Nepal	
Total	164 kg	N. S. Rajapaksa	11 December 2021	World Championships	Tashkent, Uzbekistan	
64 kg
Snatch	70 kg	Arshika V.	6 December 2019	South Asian Games	Pokhara, Nepal	
Clean and Jerk	100 kg	Arshika V.	6 December 2019	South Asian Games	Pokhara, Nepal	
Total	170 kg	Arshika V.	6 December 2019	South Asian Games	Pokhara, Nepal	
71 kg
Snatch	74 kg	D.T. Gurugama	13 December 2021	World Championships	Tashkent, Uzbekistan	
Clean and Jerk	94 kg	D.T. Gurugama	13 December 2021	World Championships	Tashkent, Uzbekistan	
Total	168 kg	D.T. Gurugama	13 December 2021	World Championships	Tashkent, Uzbekistan	
76 kg
Snatch	83 kg	Priyanthi B.C.	7 December 2019	South Asian Games	Pokhara, Nepal	
Clean and Jerk	101 kg	Priyanthi B.C.	7 December 2019	South Asian Games	Pokhara, Nepal	
Total	184 kg	Priyanthi B.C.	7 December 2019	South Asian Games	Pokhara, Nepal	
81 kg
Snatch	86 kg	Chathurika Priyanthi Balage	23 April 2021	Asian Championships	Tashkent, Uzbekistan	
Clean and Jerk	106 kg	Chathurika Priyanthi Balage	23 April 2021	Asian Championships	Tashkent, Uzbekistan	
Total	192 kg	Chathurika Priyanthi Balage	23 April 2021	Asian Championships	Tashkent, Uzbekistan	
87 kg
Snatch	81 kg	Chathurika Balage	2 August 2022	Commonwealth Games	Marston Green, United Kingdom	
Clean and Jerk	111 kg	Chathurika Balage	2 August 2022	Commonwealth Games	Marston Green, United Kingdom	
Total	192 kg	Chathurika Balage	2 August 2022	Commonwealth Games	Marston Green, United Kingdom	
+87 kg
Snatch	89 kg	Thimali Wiyannalage	3 August 2022	Commonwealth Games	Marston Green, United Kingdom	
Clean and Jerk	110 kg	Thimali Wiyannalage	3 August 2022	Commonwealth Games	Marston Green, United Kingdom	
Total	199 kg	Thimali Wiyannalage	3 August 2022	Commonwealth Games	Marston Green, United Kingdom	
