= Lisa Setiawati =

Indonesian weightlifter (born 1989)

Personal information
- Nationality: Indonesian
- Born: 4 September 1989 (age 36)
- Weight: 44.35 kg (98 lb)

Sport
- Country: Indonesia
- Sport: Weightlifting
- Event: –45 kg
Medal record
World Championships
Bronze medal – third place	2019 Pattaya	–45 kg
Southeast Asian Games
Silver medal – second place	2019 Philippines	–45 kg

Lisa Setiawati (born 4 September 1989) is an Indonesian weightlifter.

She won a medal at the 2019 World Weightlifting Championships.
