= Chayuttra Pramongkhol =

Thai weightlifter (born 1994)

Personal information
- Nationality: Thai
- Born: 29 November 1994 (age 31) Chonburi, Thailand
- Height: 1.42 m (4 ft 8 in)
- Weight: 48.23 kg (106 lb)

Sport
- Country: Thailand
- Sport: Weightlifting
- Event: –49 kg
Medal record
Women's weightlifting
Representing Thailand
World Championships
Gold medal – first place	2023 Riyadh	45 kg
Silver medal – second place	2022 Bogotá	45 kg
Disqualified	2018 Ashgabat	49 kg

Chayuttra Pramongkhol formerly Sirivimon Pramongkhol (Thai: สิริวิมล ประมงคล; born 29 November 1994) is a Thai weightlifter. She competed at the 2012 Summer Olympics in the Women's 48 kg, finishing in 4th place. In 2018 she was banned until 2020 by the International Weightlifting Federation after testing positive for 5a- androstane-3a, 17 bdiol (5aAdiol) and 5b-androstane-3a, 17 b-diol (5bAdiol).

She won the silver medal in the women's 45 kg event at the 2022 World Weightlifting Championships held in Bogotá, Colombia.

== Achievements ==
Year	Venue	Weight	Snatch (kg)				Clean & Jerk (kg)				Total	Rank
Year	Venue	Weight	1	2	3	Rank	1	2	3	Rank	Total	Rank
World Championships
2022	Bogotá, Colombia	45 kg	74	76	78	2nd place, silver medalist(s)	94	99	102	1st place, gold medalist(s)	180	2nd place, silver medalist(s)
2023	Riyadh, Saudi Arabia	45 kg	72	76	78	1st place, gold medalist(s)	95	101	—	1st place, gold medalist(s)	179	1st place, gold medalist(s)
Asian Championships
2023	Jinju, South Korea	45 kg	75	~~77~~	77	1st place, gold medalist(s)	91	95	100	1st place, gold medalist(s)	177	1st place, gold medalist(s)
Summer Olympics
2012	London, England	48 kg	78	~~80~~	82	4	106	~~108~~	109	4	191	4
Junior World Championships
2012	Antigua Guatemala, Guatemala	48 kg	77	~~79~~	~~79~~	2nd place, silver medalist(s)	102	106	~~110~~	1st place, gold medalist(s)	183	2nd place, silver medalist(s)
Summer Youth Olympics
2010	Singapore	48 kg	65	68	~~70~~	4	89	95	~~100~~	2	163	2nd place, silver medalist(s)
Youth World Championships
2009	Chiang Mai, Thailand	48 kg	65	70	72	3rd place, bronze medalist(s)	90	92	~~97~~	3rd place, bronze medalist(s)	164	3rd place, bronze medalist(s)
