= Manuela Berrío =

Colombian weightlifter (born 2000)

Personal information
- Full name: Manuela Andrea Berrío Zuluaga
- Born: 18 June 2000 (age 26) Palmira, Colombia

Sport
- Country: Colombia
- Sport: Weightlifting
- Weight class: 45 kg; 49 kg
Medal record
Representing Colombia
Women's weightlifting
World Championships
Silver medal – second place	2021 Tashkent	45 kg
Bronze medal – third place	2022 Bogotá	45 kg
Pan American Championships
Gold medal – first place	2019 Guatemala City	45 kg
Bronze medal – third place	2020 Santo Domingo	49 kg
Bolivarian Games
Gold medal – first place	2022 Valledupar	45 kg S
Gold medal – first place	2022 Valledupar	45 kg CJ
Youth World Championships
Gold medal – first place	2016 Penang	44 kg
Silver medal – second place	2017 Bangkok	44 kg

Manuela Andrea Berrío Zuluaga (born 18 June 2000) is a Colombian weightlifter. She is a two-time medalist at the World Weightlifting Championships (silver in 2021 and bronze in 2022). She is also a gold medalist at the 2019 Pan American Weightlifting Championships and a two-time gold medalist at the 2022 Bolivarian Games.

== Career ==
Berrío won the gold medal in the women's 44 kg event at the 2016 Youth World Weightlifting Championships held in Penang, Malaysia.

Berrío won the gold medal in the women's 45 kg event at the 2019 Pan American Weightlifting Championships held in Guatemala City, Guatemala. In 2021, she won the bronze medal in the women's 49 kg event at the 2020 Pan American Weightlifting Championships held in Santo Domingo, Dominican Republic.

She won the silver medal in the women's 45 kg event at the 2021 World Weightlifting Championships held in Tashkent, Uzbekistan. She won the bronze medal in the women's 45 kg event at the 2022 World Weightlifting Championships held in Bogotá, Colombia.

== Achievements ==
Year	Venue	Weight	Snatch (kg)				Clean & Jerk (kg)				Total	Rank
Year	Venue	Weight	1	2	3	Rank	1	2	3	Rank	Total	Rank
Representing Colombia
World Championships
2021	Tashkent, Uzbekistan	45 kg	75	~~77~~	~~78~~	3rd place, bronze medalist(s)	95	~~98~~	~~98~~	1st place, gold medalist(s)	170	2nd place, silver medalist(s)
2022	Bogotá, Colombia	45 kg	73	75	77	3rd place, bronze medalist(s)	91	~~93~~	93	3rd place, bronze medalist(s)	170	3rd place, bronze medalist(s)
Pan American Championships
2019	Guatemala City, Guatemala	45 kg	67	70	72	1st place, gold medalist(s)	89	91	95	1st place, gold medalist(s)	167	1st place, gold medalist(s)
2020	Santo Domingo, Dominican Republic	49 kg	76	79	~~82~~	6	97	99	101	3rd place, bronze medalist(s)	180	3rd place, bronze medalist(s)
Bolivarian Games
2022	Valledupar, Colombia	45 kg	70	74	76	1st place, gold medalist(s)	90	94	96	1st place, gold medalist(s)	—N/a	—N/a
