= 2021 World Weightlifting Championships – Women's 45 kg =

Weightlifting Championship

The women's 45 kilograms competition at the 2021 World Weightlifting Championships was held on 8 December 2021.

== Schedule ==
Date	Time	Event
8 December 2021	13:00	Group B
8 December 2021	16:00	Group A

== Medalists ==
Event	Gold		Silver		Bronze	
Snatch	Thanyathon Sukcharoen (THA)	77 kg	Şaziye Erdoğan (TUR)	76 kg	Manuela Berrío (COL)	75 kg
Clean & Jerk	Manuela Berrío (COL)	95 kg	Thanyathon Sukcharoen (THA)	95 kg	Şaziye Erdoğan (TUR)	93 kg
Total	Thanyathon Sukcharoen (THA)	172 kg	Manuela Berrío (COL)	170 kg	Şaziye Erdoğan (TUR)	169 kg

== Records ==
Prior to this competition, the existing world records were as follows.

World Record	Snatch	World Standard	85 kg	—	1 November 2018
World Record	Clean & Jerk	World Standard	108 kg	—	1 November 2018
World Record	Total	World Standard	191 kg	—	1 November 2018

== Results ==
Rank	Athlete	Group	Snatch (kg)				Clean & Jerk (kg)				Total
Rank	Athlete	Group	1	2	3	Rank	1	2	3	Rank	Total
1st place, gold medalist(s)	Thanyathon Sukcharoen (THA)	A	75	~~77~~	77	1st place, gold medalist(s)	93	95	~~97~~	2nd place, silver medalist(s)	172
2nd place, silver medalist(s)	Manuela Berrío (COL)	A	75	~~77~~	~~78~~	3rd place, bronze medalist(s)	95	~~98~~	~~98~~	1st place, gold medalist(s)	170
3rd place, bronze medalist(s)	Şaziye Erdoğan (TUR)	A	74	~~76~~	76	2nd place, silver medalist(s)	93	~~95~~	~~95~~	3rd place, bronze medalist(s)	169
4	Lin Cheng-jing (TPE)	A	70	74	~~77~~	4	90	~~94~~	~~94~~	4	164
5	Teodora-Luminița Hîncu (MDA)	A	65	68	70	5	80	83	85	6	155
6	Rosielis Quintana (VEN)	A	66	69	~~70~~	6	80	~~84~~	84	7	153
7	Nadezhda Panova (RWF)	A	63	~~65~~	65	7	~~80~~	80	~~86~~	10	145
8	Najla Khoirunnisa (INA)	B	61	64	~~66~~	8	80	~~83~~	~~84~~	8	144
9	Srimali Samarakoon (SRI)	B	58	~~63~~	~~63~~	9	78	~~80~~	~~80~~	11	136
—	Regina Shaidullina (RWF)	A	~~65~~	~~65~~	~~65~~	—	85	89	~~91~~	5	—
—	Mary Flor Diaz (PHI)	A	~~65~~	~~65~~	~~65~~	—	77	80	~~83~~	9	—
