= Rosielis Quintana =

Venezuelan weightlifter (born 2000)

Personal information
- Full name: Rosielis Coromoto Quintana Mendoza
- Born: 2000 (age 25–26)

Sport
- Country: Venezuela
- Sport: Weightlifting
- Weight class: 45 kg
Medal record
Women's weightlifting
Representing Venezuela
Pan American Championships
Gold medal – first place	2023 Bariloche	45 kg
Silver medal – second place	2021 Guayaquil	45 kg
Bronze medal – third place	2022 Bogotá	45 kg
Bolivarian Games
Silver medal – second place	2022 Valledupar	45 kg S
Silver medal – second place	2022 Valledupar	45 kg CJ

Rosielis (Note: Sometimes written as Rosielys Coromoto Quintana Mendoza.) Coromoto Quintana Mendoza (born 2000) is a Venezuelan weightlifter. She is a three-time medalist, including gold, at the Pan American Weightlifting Championships. She is also a two-time silver medalist at the Bolivarian Games.

== Career ==
Quintana competed in the women's 45 kg event at the 2019 World Weightlifting Championships in Pattaya, Thailand.

She won the silver medal in the women's 45 kg event at the 2021 Pan American Weightlifting Championships held in Guayaquil, Ecuador. She competed in the women's 45 kg event at the 2021 World Weightlifting Championships held in Tashkent, Uzbekistan.

Quintana won two silver medals at the 2022 Bolivarian Games held in Valledupar, Colombia. She won the bronze medal in her event at the 2022 Pan American Weightlifting Championships held in Bogotá, Colombia. She competed in the women's 45 kg event at the 2022 World Weightlifting Championships in Bogotá, Colombia.

She won the gold medal in her event at the 2023 Pan American Weightlifting Championships held in Bariloche, Argentina. She also won the gold medal in the Snatch and Clean & Jerk events.

== Achievements ==
Year	Venue	Weight	Snatch (kg)				Clean & Jerk (kg)				Total	Rank
Year	Venue	Weight	1	2	3	Rank	1	2	3	Rank	Total	Rank
World Championships
2019	Pattaya, Thailand	45 kg	70	~~73~~	~~73~~	6	87	~~90~~	~~93~~	6	157	6
2021	Tashkent, Uzbekistan	45 kg	66	69	~~70~~	6	80	~~84~~	84	7	153	6
2022	Bogotá, Colombia	45 kg	~~68~~	68	~~71~~	11	86	~~89~~	~~89~~	9	154	10
Pan American Championships
2021	Guayaquil, Ecuador	45 kg	64	67	~~70~~	2nd place, silver medalist(s)	81	83	86	2nd place, silver medalist(s)	153	2nd place, silver medalist(s)
2022	Bogotá, Colombia	45 kg	65	68	~~70~~	4	~~82~~	82	87	3rd place, bronze medalist(s)	155	3rd place, bronze medalist(s)
2023	Bariloche, Argentina	45 kg	68	70	71	1st place, gold medalist(s)	86	89	~~92~~	1st place, gold medalist(s)	160	1st place, gold medalist(s)
Bolivarian Games
2022	Valledupar, Colombia	45 kg	70	~~74~~	75	2nd place, silver medalist(s)	88	93	~~95~~	2nd place, silver medalist(s)	—N/a	—N/a
