= Reinner Arango =

Venezuelan weightlifter (born 2004)

Personal information
- Full name: Reinner Josué Arango Méndez
- Born: 24 March 2004 (age 22)

Sport
- Country: Venezuela
- Sport: Weightlifting
- Weight class: 67 kg; 73 kg
Medal record
Men's weightlifting
Representing Venezuela
South American Games
Bronze medal – third place	2022 Asunción	67 kg
Pan American Championships
Silver medal – second place	2024 Caracas	73 kg
Silver medal – second place	2025 Cali	71 kg
Central American and Caribbean Games
Gold medal – first place	2026 Santo Domingo	– 71 kg Clean & Jerk
Silver medal – second place	2026 Santo Domingo	– 71 kg Snatch
Silver medal – second place	2023 San Salvador	67 kg S
Silver medal – second place	2023 San Salvador	67 kg CJ
Bolivarian Games
Bronze medal – third place	2022 Valledupar	67 kg S
Junior World Championships
Gold medal – first place	2023 Guadalajara	73 kg
Junior Pan American Games
Silver medal – second place	2021 Cali-Valle	67 kg
Youth World Championships
Silver medal – second place	2021 Jeddah	67 kg

Reinner Josué Arango Méndez (born 24 March 2004) is a Venezuelan weightlifter. He won the bronze medal in the men's 67 kg event at the 2022 South American Games held in Asunción, Paraguay.

He won the silver medal in his event at the 2021 Junior Pan American Games held in Colombia. He won the bronze medal in the men's 67 kg Snatch event at the 2022 Bolivarian Games held in Valledupar, Colombia.

In 2024, he won the silver medal in the men's 73 kg event at the Pan American Weightlifting Championships held in Caracas, Venezuela. He won a gold and a silver medal in the 71 kg category of the 2026 Central American and Caribbean Games.

== Achievements ==
Year	Venue	Weight	Snatch (kg)				Clean & Jerk (kg)				Total	Rank
Year	Venue	Weight	1	2	3	Rank	1	2	3	Rank	Total	Rank
South American Games
2022	Asunción, Paraguay	67 kg	127	131	~~133~~	—N/a	162	166	~~170~~	—N/a	297	3rd place, bronze medalist(s)
Bolivarian Games
2022	Valledupar, Colombia	67 kg	127	~~132~~	~~134~~	3rd place, bronze medalist(s)	~~160~~	161	~~163~~	4	—N/a	—N/a
Junior Pan American Games
2021	Cali, Colombia	67 kg	123	~~127~~	128	—N/a	149	158	~~162~~	—N/a	286	2nd place, silver medalist(s)
