= Melike Günal =

Turkish weightlifter (born 1998)

Personal information
- Born: 5 April 1998 (age 28) Kahramanmaraş, Turkey
- Weight: 114.18 kg (251.7 lb)

Sport
- Country: Turkey
- Sport: Weightlifting
- Club: ASKİ Spor
Medal record
Women's weightlifting
Representing Turkey
European Championships
| Silver medal – second place | 2022 Tirana | +87 kg |
| Bronze medal – third place | 2021 Moscow | +87 kg |
European U23 Championships
| Gold medal – first place | 2019 Bucharest | +87 kg |
European Junior Championships
| Bronze medal – third place | 2018 Zamość | +90 kg |

Melike Günal (born 5 April 1998) is a Turkish weightlifter competing in the women's +87 kg division. She is a member of ASKİ Spor in Ankara.

== Early life and education ==
Melike GünaI was born in Kahramanmaraş, southeastern Turkey on 5 April 1998. She studied Physical Education at Adıyaman University.

== Sports career ==
=== Wrestling to weightlifting ===
She initially began with wrestling sport. During her trainings for wrestling in Kahramanmaraş, she lifted weights in order to be stronger. With the encouragement of her coach, she switched over to weightlifting, and became several times Turkish champion.

=== Major results ===
Günal took three bronze medals in the +90 kg event at the 2018 European Junior & U23 Weightlifting Championships held in Zamość, Poland. In 2019, she became three times gold medalist at the European Junior & U23 Championships in Bucharest, Romania. She took three gold medals in the +87 kg division at the 6th International Solidarity Championships in Tashkent, Uzbekistan. She won three bronze medals at the 2021 European Weightlifting Championships held in Moscow, Russia, in the +87 kghe Snatch and Clean and jerk events, taking the bronze medal in the total. She is the Turkish record holder in +87 kg Snatch (108 kg), Clean & Jerk (135) and total (243 kg).

At the 2021 European Junior & U23 Weightlifting Championships in Rovaniemi, Finland, she won the bronze medal in her event.

She won the silver medal in her event at the 2022 European Weightlifting Championships held in Tirana, Albania.

| Year | Venue | Weight | Snatch (kg) | | | | Clean & Jerk (kg) | | | | Total (kg) | Rank |
| Year | Venue | Weight | 1 | 2 | 3 | Rank | 1 | 2 | 3 | Rank | Total (kg) | Rank |
European Championships
| 2021 | Moscow, Russia | +87 kg | 105 | ~~108~~ | 108 | 3rd place, bronze medalist(s) | 130 | ~~135~~ | 135 | 3rd place, bronze medalist(s) | 243 | 3rd place, bronze medalist(s) |
| 2022 | Tirana, Albania | +87 kg | 102 | 105 | 108 | 2nd place, silver medalist(s) | 125 | 130 | 134 | 2nd place, silver medalist(s) | 242 | 2nd place, silver medalist(s) |
