= Stella Holt =

American theater producer (1899–1967)

- Born: Beatrice Holtzer; November 26, 1899; Poland
- Died: August 28, 1967; New York, New York
- Education: Cornell University
- Occupation: Off-Broadway Producer
- Years active: 1952-1967

Stella Holt (November 26, 1899 – August 28, 1967) was an American theater producer. She served as managing director of the off-Broadway Greenwich Mews Theater in New York City for 15 years.

== Early life and education ==
Beatrice Holtzer was born in 1899 in Poland. Her last name was changed from Holtzer to Holt upon immigrating to entering the United States. She changed her first name to Stella, meaning “Star”.

She lost her sight at age 17, but said that she found her blindness "no real handicap." "It's very unimportant to me," she told the New York Times.

Holt graduated from Cornell University and initially found employment as a social worker before becoming frustrated by her inability to create meaningful change on behalf of her clients. She shifted her focus to putting on art exhibitions, and said "I found, if any, that my talent lay in organizing."

== Career ==
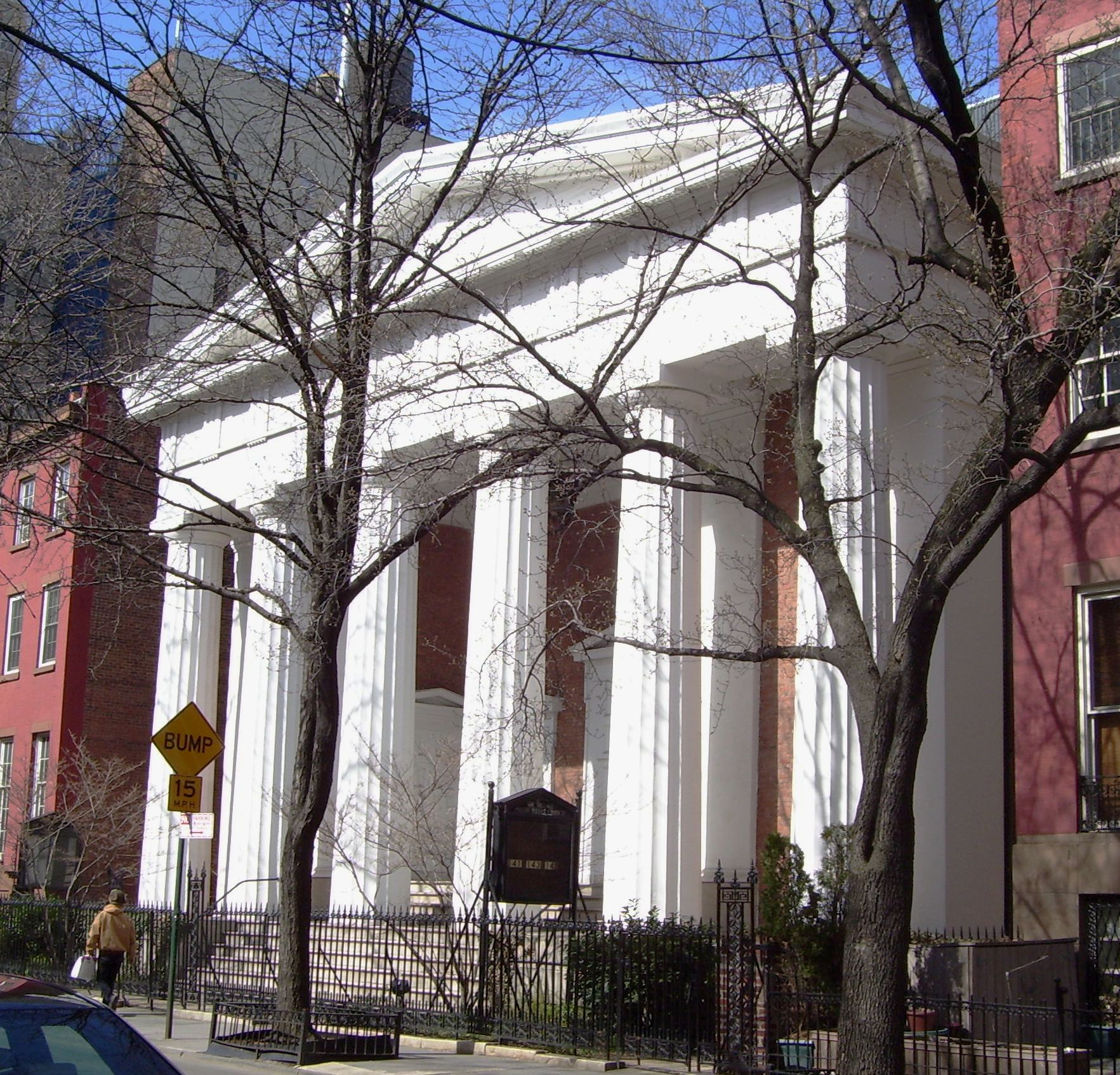
The Village Presbyterian Church, home of Stella Holt's Greenwich Mews Theatre

=== Greenwich Mews Theater ===
Holt became managing director of the Greenwich Mews Theater in 1952. She went on to produce 38 plays over her 15 years at the 200-seat theater, located in the Village Presbyterian Church. She would select which plays to produce by going through submissions with her partner Frances Drucker, a former high school teacher with whom she had a 20-year relationship. Her preference was for "plays of serious content, poetic quality".

Under Holt's leadership, the Greenwich Mews Theater produced plays by Padraic Colum, René Marqués, Sean O'Casey, and Jules Romains. Playwright Tennessee Williams praised Holt's production of his Orpheus Descending, which he preferred over both the Broadway production and the film adaptation.

Director Adrian Hall got his first job in New York City theater as a janitor at the Greenwich Mews. Holt quickly began encouraging his directorial work, including a production of Sean O'Casey's Red Roses for Me. Hall traveled with Holt to Hawaii in 1962, with the help of a Ford Foundation grant, to study the possibility of opening a regional theater there.

The Greenwich Mews production of Monday's Heroes, by Lester Pine, featured a young Zina Bethune in her first acting role. Diana Sands made her New York stage debut at the Greenwich Mews; Vinie Burrows, Paulene Myers, and Gilbert Price also appeared there. Holt preferred to be closely involved with the casting process in her productions, and said that her vision impairment caused no difficulty: "I listen carefully," she told the Boston Globe, "I can 'feel' it if an actor is right for a role."

Holt produced the work of many leading Black writers, including Langston Hughes, Loften Mitchell, Alice Childress, Bill Gunn, and William Branch. The Greenwich Mews Theater, under her leadership, was one of only a few producing shows with integrated or all-Black casts. In a remembrance after Holt's death, Loften Mitchell wrote that "she produced more plays by black writers than any other white producer that I know."

In 1955 Greenwich Mews presented Alice Childress's first full-length play, Trouble In Mind, about the experiences of Black artists in the white-dominated theater industry. The play was directed by Childress herself, starring Clarice Taylor; it ran for 91 performances. During the production process, there was a dispute between Childress and the producers (a group that included Holt) over the ending of the play. The producers pushed for a more optimistic conclusion, asking for a "scene of unity" between Black and white characters – the ending as originally written provided no such redemption. Childress argued that this outcome was "wishful thinking," and would be unrealistic, but was forced to make the change. When the play was published, the text was restored to its original form.

In 1965, the Cuban-born director Gilberto Zaldívar joined Holt as an associate producer at the Greenwich Mews, becoming co-producer with Frances Drucker after Holt's death.

=== Collaboration with Langston Hughes ===
Stella Holt produced Langston Hughes's musical Simply Heavenly in May 1957, with a budget of $4,200 and a cast that starred Mel Stewart and Claudia McNeil. The production, directed by Joshua Shelley with music by David Martin, began its off-Broadway run at the 85th Street Playhouse. The fire department closed the theater after 49 performances because of a failed building inspection, so Holt and Hughes decided to move the production to Broadway. Simply Heavenly began performances again in August at the Playhouse Theater.

After a successful Broadway run, Simply Heavenly re-opened off-Broadway in November 1957. It was shut down again in January 1958, after a ruling by Actors' Equity. The show's union cast alleged that Stella Holt was making prohibited and underhanded budget maneuvers to update the building and meet inspection requirements.

Despite these difficulties, Langston Hughes brought Holt on again as a co-producer on his Jerico-Jim Crow in 1964. In 1965 Holt produced Hughes's Prodigal Son at the Greenwich Mews, directed by Vinnette Carroll. Prodigal Son drew large crowds in New York, and buoyed by this success Holt put together a European tour. The touring production was plagued by financial issues, including late payment of the touring company. Holt was blamed for these problems, and according to playwright Isaiah Sheffer, "some of her business practices were, to put it mildly, highly questionable ... I saw enough hanky-panky and cutting of corners to wonder about her ethics."

== Activism ==
Holt served as the executive secretary of the Citizens' Committee of the Upper West Side. In collaboration with that group, she advocated for integration in the armed forces.

== Death and legacy ==
Stella Holt decided to rename the Greenwich Mews Theater in honor of Langston Hughes after his death in May 1967.

Holt herself died shortly thereafter. On August 28, 1967, at age 50, she died of a heart attack at Beth Israel Hospital in New York City. A memorial service was held at the theater. Paul Robeson, one of the singers she had introduced to the public in her theater, sang “To Dream The Impossible Dream at her memorial service . In the wake of the deaths, it was decided that the name Greenwich Mews would be retained, and that instead of the planned renaming, the theater would be dedicated to the memory of both Langston Hughes and Stella Holt.

In 1969 Holt's widowed partner Frances Drucker created a memorial fund in her name, with an annual award to be given to each season's best off-Broadway play. The fund committee was chaired by Diana Sands and Adrian Hall, and committee members included Miriam Colón, Ossie Davis, Ruby Dee, Jack Gilford, Louis Gossett, Martyn Green, Lucille Lortel, Loften Mitchell, Joseph Papp, Lloyd Richards, Hilda Simms, Beatrice Straight, and Tennessee Williams. Clive Barnes, Whitney Bolton, Theophilus Lewis, and Frederick O'Neal made up the inaugural panel of judges, and the award was given to Lonne Elder III for his play Ceremonies in Dark Old Men.

Stella’s Legacy continues on in her one living relative, Jami Delia McCluskey-Filiault, who is writing about her and promoting her legacy with theater groups, colleges and more. Ms. Filiault is involved in theater, music, and performance and resides in Western Massachusetts.
