= 2022 World Weightlifting Championships – Women's 45 kg =

The women's 45 kilograms competition at the 2022 World Weightlifting Championships was held on 5 December 2022.

== Schedule ==
Date	Time	Event
5 December 2022	11:30	Group B
5 December 2022	19:00	Group A

== Medalists ==
Event	Gold		Silver		Bronze	
Snatch	Thanyathon Sukcharoen (THA)	82 kg	Chayuttra Pramongkhol (THA)	78 kg	Manuela Berrío (COL)	77 kg
Clean & Jerk	Chayuttra Pramongkhol (THA)	102 kg	Thanyathon Sukcharoen (THA)	100 kg	Manuela Berrío (COL)	93 kg
Total	Thanyathon Sukcharoen (THA)	182 kg	Chayuttra Pramongkhol (THA)	180 kg	Manuela Berrío (COL)	170 kg

== Records ==
Prior to this competition, the existing world records were as follows.

World Record	Snatch	World Standard	85 kg	—	1 November 2018
World Record	Clean & Jerk	World Standard	108 kg	—	1 November 2018
World Record	Total	World Standard	191 kg	—	1 November 2018

== Results ==
Rank	Athlete	Group	Snatch (kg)				Clean & Jerk (kg)				Total
Rank	Athlete	Group	1	2	3	Rank	1	2	3	Rank	Total
1st place, gold medalist(s)	Thanyathon Sukcharoen (THA)	A	77	79	82	1st place, gold medalist(s)	95	100	~~103~~	2nd place, silver medalist(s)	182
2nd place, silver medalist(s)	Chayuttra Pramongkhol (THA)	A	74	76	78	2nd place, silver medalist(s)	94	99	102	1st place, gold medalist(s)	180
3rd place, bronze medalist(s)	Manuela Berrío (COL)	A	73	75	77	3rd place, bronze medalist(s)	91	~~93~~	93	3rd place, bronze medalist(s)	170
4	Khổng Mỹ Phượng (VIE)	A	76	~~78~~	~~78~~	4	87	~~89~~	~~89~~	7	163
5	Cicely Kyle (USA)	A	~~71~~	71	~~73~~	5	~~90~~	~~90~~	91	5	162
6	Emily Rosa Figueiredo (BRA)	A	~~71~~	~~71~~	71	7	87	~~89~~	~~89~~	6	158
7	María Barco (MEX)	A	64	67	~~69~~	12	85	88	91	4	158
8	Adriana Pană (ROU)	A	65	68	71	6	82	~~86~~	86	10	157
9	Cansu Bektaş (TUR)	A	69	~~72~~	~~75~~	9	~~87~~	87	~~92~~	8	156
10	Rosielis Quintana (VEN)	A	~~68~~	68	~~71~~	11	86	~~89~~	~~89~~	9	154
11	Marta García (ESP)	B	~~68~~	68	70	8	78	~~81~~	81	13	151
12	Joana Anrique (ESP)	B	~~66~~	66	68	10	~~82~~	~~82~~	82	12	150
13	Hong Zi-yu (TPE)	B	~~65~~	65	~~68~~	13	80	83	~~85~~	11	148
14	Nadezhda Nguen (BUL)	A	~~65~~	~~65~~	65	14	~~80~~	~~80~~	80	14	145
15	Fiorella Cueva (PER)	B	57	~~60~~	~~60~~	15	76	~~79~~	~~79~~	15	133
