= Trouble in Mind (play) =

Play by Alice Childress

- Written by: Alice Childress
- Characters: Wiletta Mayer; Al Manners; John Nevins; Millie Davis; Sheldon Forrester; Judith (Judy) Sears; Bill O’Wray; Eddie Fenton; Henry

Premiere
- Date: November 3, 1955
- Place: Greenwich Mews Theatre

Trouble in Mind is a play by Alice Childress, which debuted Off-Broadway at the Greenwich Mews Theatre in 1955. It premiered on Broadway at Roundabout Theatre Company's American Airlines Theatre on November 18, 2021. The play focuses on racism and sexism in American theatre as an experienced black actress, cast in a starring role in a Broadway play for the first time, clashes with a white director in rehearsals. It was published in the anthologies Black Theater: a 20th Century Collection of the Work of its Best Playwrights (Dodd, Mead & Co. 1971), the second edition of Black Drama in America: an Anthology (Howard University Press, 1994), Plays by American Women: 1930-1960 (Applause Books, 2001), and Alice Childress: Selected Plays (Northwestern University Press, 2011). It was first published on its own by Theatre Communications Group in 2022.

== Productions ==
=== Original 1955 Off-Broadway ===
The original Off-Broadway production was produced by Stella Holt, sponsored by the Village Presbyterian Church and the Brotherhood Synagogue. Childress co-directed, alongside Clarice Taylor, who also starred as Willetta. Hal England was featured in the supporting role of Eddie. The sets and lighting were designed by Vincent Sorrentino. The production opened on November 3, 1955, and ran for 91 performances. In 1957, a Broadway transfer had been planned, renamed So Early Monday Morning. The production was cancelled as Childress refused to subdue its content.

=== 1992 British premiere ===
The play made its British premiere at the Tricycle Theatre in London on October 8, 1992, directed by Nicolas Kent. Carmen Munroe starred as Wiletta with Maurice Roëves as Al. The production ended on November 14.

=== 2017 London ===
Following a run at Theatre Royal Bath's Ustinov Theatre, a new production opened in London at the Coronet Theatre from September 14 to October 14, 2017, directed by Laurence Boswell. It starred Tanya Moodie and Jonathan Slinger.

=== 2021 Broadway premiere ===
Trouble in Mind finally made its Broadway debut on November 18, 2021, at the American Airlines Theatre. It was directed by Charles Randolph-Wright and featured sets designed by Arnulfo Maldonado, costumes designed by Emilio Sosa, lighting designed by Kathy A. Perkins, sound design by Dan Moses Schreier, original music by Nona Hendryx, and hair and wigs designed by Cookie Jordan. The production starred LaChanze as Wiletta, Michael Zegen as Al, Chuck Cooper as Sheldon, Danielle Campbell as Judy, Brandon Micheal Hall as John, Jessica Frances Dukes as Millie, Don Stephenson as Bill, Simon Jones as Henry, and Alex Mickiewicz as Eddie. The limited run closed on January 9, 2022, after 58 performances and 20 previews. The production was nominated for four Tony Awards including Best Revival of a Play, Best Actress in a Play (LaChanze), Best Featured Actor in a Play (Chuck Cooper), and Best Costume Design in a Play (Emilio Sosa).

=== 2021 London ===
Less than a month after the opening of the Broadway production, the National Theatre in London opened a production at its Dorfman Theatre on December 10, 2021. Moodie reprised her role from the 2017 production. This production was directed by Nancy Medina and starred (along with Moodie) Cyril Nri, Rory Keenan, Naana Agyei-Ampadu, John Hollingworth, Emma Canning, and Daniel Adeosun.

=== Other productions ===
Other productions of Trouble in Mind have included:

- New Federal Theatre Project, 1979. Starred Theresa Merritt.
- William Sloane House, 1987.
- Negro Ensemble Company at Theatre Row, 1998.
- Yale Repertory Theatre, 2007.
- Aurora Theatre Company, 2010.
- Arena Stage, 2011.
- Intiman Theatre Festival, 2013.
- Two River Theater, 2014.
- PlayMakers Repertory Company, 2015.
- Yale Repertory Theatre, 2019.
- Shaw Festival, 2021. Canadian premiere.
- TimeLine Theatre Company Chicago, 2022.
- TimeLine Theatre Company Chicago, 2022.
- Royal Manitoba Theatre Centre Winnipeg, 2023.
- Hartford Stage, 2023.
- Baxter Theatre Cape Town, 2024.
- Pittsburgh Public Theater Pittsburgh, PA, 2025.
- Collective Consciousness Theater New Haven, CT, 2026.

== Adaptation ==
A two-part audio adaptation of the play was broadcast on BBC Radio 4 in 2026. It starred Doña Croll as Wiletta Mayers and Joseph Millson as Al Manners.

== Awards and honors ==
=== 2021 Broadway ===
| Year | Award | Category | Nominee | Result |
|---|---|---|---|---|
| 2022 | Tony Awards | Best Revival of a Play | | Nominated |
| 2022 | Tony Awards | Best Actress in a Play | LaChanze | Nominated |
| 2022 | Tony Awards | Best Featured Actor in a Play | Chuck Cooper | Nominated |
| 2022 | Tony Awards | Best Costume Design in a Play | Emilio Sosa | Nominated |
| 2022 | Drama Desk Award | Outstanding Revival of a Play | | Nominated |
| 2022 | Drama Desk Award | Outstanding Featured Actor in a Play | Chuck Cooper | Nominated |
| 2022 | Outer Critics Circle Award | Outstanding Revival of a Play | | Nominated |
| 2022 | Outer Critics Circle Award | Outstanding Actress in a Play | LaChanze | Won |
| 2022 | Outer Critics Circle Award | Outstanding Featured Actor in a Play | Chuck Cooper | Nominated |
| 2022 | Outer Critics Circle Award | Outstanding Costume Design | Emilio Sosa | Nominated |
| 2022 | Drama League Awards | Outstanding Revival of a Play | | Nominated |
| 2022 | Drama League Awards | Distinguished Performance Award | LaChanze | Nominated |
