= Ludia Montero =

Cuban weightlifter (born 1999)

Personal information
- Born: 17 April 1999 (age 27) Río Cauto, Cuba
- Weight: 44.95 kg (99 lb)

Sport
- Country: Cuba
- Sport: Weightlifting
- Event: –45 kg
Medal record
Women's weightlifting
Representing Cuba
World Championships
Silver medal – second place	2019 Pattaya	45 kg
Pan American Championships
Bronze medal – third place	2018 Santo Domingo	48 kg
Central American and Caribbean Games
	2026 Santo Domingo	48 kg S
Bronze medal – third place	2026 Santo Domingo	48 kg CJ

Ludia Marguiela Montero Ramos (born 17 April 1999) is a Cuban weightlifter.

She competed in the women's 49 kg event at the 2019 Pan American Games held in Lima, Peru. She won a medal at the 2019 World Weightlifting Championships.

She represented Cuba at the 2020 Summer Olympics in Tokyo, Japan. She finished in 6th place in the women's 49 kg event.
