= Gilberto Zaldívar =

Cuban-born American director

Juan Gilberto Zaldívar (March 28, 1934 – October 6, 2009) was the Cuban-born American co-founder of the Repertorio Español, a Spanish language theater company based in New York City that presents classic Spanish plays, modern works from Hispanic playwrights and adaptions of works from other languages. Zaldívar spent nearly four decades at the helm of Repertorio Español, which he established in 1968 together with Artistic Director René Buch.

== Biography ==
Zaldívar was born in 1934 in the town of Deleyte in Cuba's eastern Holguín Province and attended the University of Havana. In Cuba, he established the Teatro Arlequín, which focused on contemporary works. Zaldívar was hired by the local affiliate of B.F. Goodrich, a position that lasted until 1961 when his personal disagreements with the direction of the government of Fidel Castro led him to emigrate to the United States, where he found an accounting job with Diners Club in New York City and worked his way up to become an executive there.

Building on his experience in Cuba, Zaldívar decided to focus his full-time efforts on theater, initially working with mainstream groups like the Greenwich Mews Theater, led by producer Stella Holt, which sought to include works from minority playwrights. He decided to go off on his own and created Repertorio Español in 1968 together with René Buch, a Cuban emigre who was an art critic who had attended Yale Drama School. With the rise of the Hispanic population in New York City, Zaldívar recognized an opportunity to involve the "hundreds of Spanish actors in New York working in restaurants and offices who are highly desirous of working again in the theater" with the hope of providing acting positions for the many "Spanish, Cuban and Puerto Rican actors who come here to find opportunities to perform". By 1972, Zaldívar had raised the funds needed to be based at the 140-seat Gramercy Arts Theater in Manhattan on East 27th Street.

By the time of his death, Repertorio Español had produced plays ranging from Spanish works of the 17th century such as those by Pedro Calderón de la Barca and new works from Hispanic playwrights, totaling more than 250 plays in 40 years with appearances from such actors as Raúl Juliá. The company produced Spanish-language works by Federico García Lorca and Miguel de Unamuno. Translations of English-language plays such as The Fantasticks and Who's Afraid of Virginia Woolf?, as well as novel adaptions of works from Gabriel García Márquez and Mario Vargas Llosa were put on stage. Repertorio Español has run an annual playwriting competition for Spanish-language dramatists since the 1990s. The production of The Fantasticks toured Central and South America under the sponsorship of the United States Information Agency. In 1988, the company toured his native Cuba.

Zaldívar's work has won Drama Desk Awards, Obie Awards and received the New York State Governor's Award. The University of Miami's Cuban/Latino Theater Archive called Repertorio Español "a national treasure, providing a rich cultural environment which is unmatched by any other Spanish-language theater company".

== Personal ==
Zaldívar stepped down from his leadership role at the Repertorio Español in 2005 due to his progressing illness.

A resident of Manhattan, Zaldívar died at his home there in the Gramercy neighborhood at age 75 on October 6, 2009, due to complications of dementia with Lewy bodies. Zaldívar was survived by his companion, Robert Weber Federico, as well as a sister and several cousins.
