= Şaziye Erdoğan =

Turkish weightlifter (born 1992)

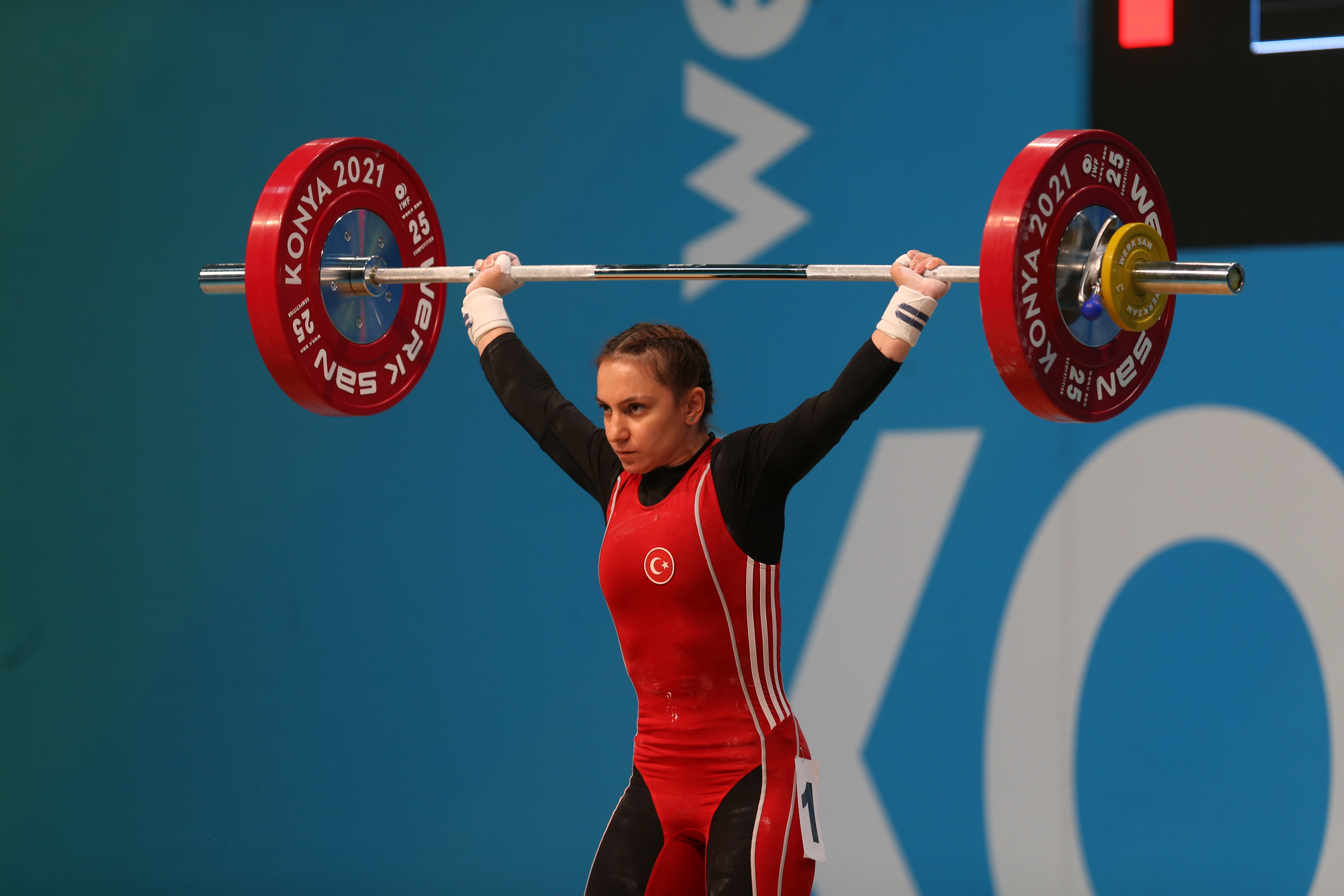

Personal information
- Full name: Şaziye Erdoğan-Okur
- Nationality: Turkish
- Born: 23 February 1992 (age 34) Ankara, Turkey
- Height: 153 cm (5 ft 0 in)
- Weight: 45 kg (99 lb)

Sport
- Country: Turkey
- Sport: Weightlifting
- Event: –45 kg
- Coached by: Talat Ünlü, Mustafa Doğan, Erkan Kayır and Nurcihan Gönül
Medal record
Women's weightlifting
Representing Turkey
World Championships
Gold medal – first place	2019 Pattaya	45 kg
Bronze medal – third place	2021 Tashkent	45 kg
European Championships
Gold medal – first place	2019 Batumi	45 kg
Gold medal – first place	2022 Tirana	45 kg
Bronze medal – third place	2010 Minsk	48 kg
Islamic Solidarity Games
Silver medal – second place	2017 Baku	48 kg
Silver medal – second place	2021 Konya	49 kg S
Silver medal – second place	2021 Konya	49 kg CJ
Silver medal – second place	2021 Konya	49 kg T
Mediterranean Games
Gold medal – first place	2018 Tarragona	48 kg S
Gold medal – first place	2018 Tarragona	48 kg CJ
Bronze medal – third place	2022 Oran	48 kg S
Bronze medal – third place	2022 Oran	48 kg CJ
European Junior Championships
Gold medal – first place	2009 Landskrona	48 kg

Şaziye Erdoğan-Okur (born February 23,1992) is a Turkish weightlifter competing in the Women's −45 kg division. Okur is the current world record holder in the −44 kg division of youth category with 77 kg in the snatch, 92 kg in the clean & jerk events and 169 kg in total.

== Career ==
She was born to a poor family in Ankara, where her father was a construction worker. Already at the age of 11, she started with weightlifting in the primary school in Keçiören, Ankara.

At the 2009 European Weightlifting Junior Championships held in Landskrona, Sweden, on 28 July, she broke four European youth records lifting 79.0 kg in snatch, 97.0 kg in clean&jerk and 172.0 and then 176.kg in total.

She is trained by Talat Ünlü, Mustafa Doğan, Erkan Kayır and Nurcihan Gönül.

In 2013, Okur was banned from international competition by the International Weightlifting Federation for 2 years for use of anabolic steroid Stanozolol.

She won the bronze medal in the women's 45 kg event at the 2021 World Weightlifting Championships held in Tashkent, Uzbekistan.

She won the gold medal in the women's 45 kg event at the 2022 European Weightlifting Championships held in Tirana, Albania. She won the bronze medal in the women's 49 kg Snatch and Clean & Jerk events at the 2022 Mediterranean Games held in Oran, Algeria.

== Major results ==
Year	Venue	Weight	Snatch (kg)				Clean & Jerk (kg)				Total	Rank
Year	Venue	Weight	1	2	3	Rank	1	2	3	Rank	Total	Rank
World Championships
2019	Pattaya, Thailand	45 kg	73	75	77	1st place, gold medalist(s)	90	92	~~96~~	2nd place, silver medalist(s)	169	1st place, gold medalist(s)
2021	Tashkent, Uzbekistan	45 kg	74	~~76~~	76	2nd place, silver medalist(s)	93	~~95~~	~~95~~	3rd place, bronze medalist(s)	169	3rd place, bronze medalist(s)
European Championships
2019	(Georgia (country)) Batumi, Georgia	45 kg	70	73	75	1st place, gold medalist(s)	88	~~91~~	~~91~~	2nd place, silver medalist(s)	163	1st place, gold medalist(s)
2022	Tirana, Albania	45 kg	71	73	~~75~~	1st place, gold medalist(s)	88	90	-	1st place, gold medalist(s)	163	1st place, gold medalist(s)
Mediterranean Games
2018	Tarragona, Spain	48 kg	74	~~77~~	78	1st place, gold medalist(s)	93	96	~~101~~	1st place, gold medalist(s)	174	1
2022	Oran, Algeria	49 kg	73	75	~~79~~	3rd place, bronze medalist(s)	92	95	~~97~~	3rd place, bronze medalist(s)	170	3
Islamic Solidarity Games
2017	Baku, Azerbaijan	48 kg	70	74	~~76~~	3rd place, bronze medalist(s)	90	~~93~~	93	2nd place, silver medalist(s)	166	2nd place, silver medalist(s)
