= 2023 World Weightlifting Championships – Women's 45 kg =

The women's 45 kilograms competition at the 2023 World Weightlifting Championships was held on 4 September 2023.

== Schedule ==
| Date | Time | Event |
|---|---|---|
| 4 September 2023 | 19:00 | Group A |

== Medalists ==
| Event | Gold | | Silver | | Bronze | |
|---|---|---|---|---|---|---|
| Snatch | Sirivimon Pramongkhol (THA) | 78 kg | Rosina Randafiarison (MAD) | 77 kg | Cansu Bektaş (TUR) | 75 kg |
| Clean & Jerk | Sirivimon Pramongkhol (THA) | 101 kg | Rosina Randafiarison (MAD) | 93 kg | Cansu Bektaş (TUR) | 87 kg |
| Total | Sirivimon Pramongkhol (THA) | 179 kg | Rosina Randafiarison (MAD) | 170 kg | Cansu Bektaş (TUR) | 162 kg |

== Records ==
Prior to this competition, the existing world records were as follows.

| World Record | Snatch | World Standard | 85 kg | — | 1 November 2018 |
| World Record | Clean & Jerk | World Standard | 108 kg | — | 1 November 2018 |
| World Record | Total | World Standard | 191 kg | — | 1 November 2018 |

== Results ==
| Rank | Athlete | Group | Snatch (kg) | | | | Clean & Jerk (kg) | | | | Total |
| Rank | Athlete | Group | 1 | 2 | 3 | Rank | 1 | 2 | 3 | Rank | Total |
|---|---|---|---|---|---|---|---|---|---|---|---|
| 1st place, gold medalist(s) | Sirivimon Pramongkhol (THA) | A | 72 | 76 | 78 | 1st place, gold medalist(s) | 95 | 101 | — | 1st place, gold medalist(s) | 179 |
| 2nd place, silver medalist(s) | Rosina Randafiarison (MAD) | A | 70 | 75 | 77 | 2nd place, silver medalist(s) | 93 | ~~100~~ | ~~100~~ | 2nd place, silver medalist(s) | 170 |
| 3rd place, bronze medalist(s) | Cansu Bektaş (TUR) | A | 70 | 72 | 75 | 3rd place, bronze medalist(s) | 87 | ~~90~~ | ~~91~~ | 3rd place, bronze medalist(s) | 162 |
| 4 | Marta García (ESP) | A | 69 | 71 | ~~73~~ | 4 | 81 | ~~84~~ | 84 | 5 | 155 |
| 5 | María Barco (MEX) | A | 60 | 63 | ~~66~~ | 7 | 83 | 86 | ~~90~~ | 4 | 149 |
| 6 | Ruth Fuentefría (ESP) | A | 67 | ~~69~~ | ~~72~~ | 6 | 78 | 80 | ~~82~~ | 7 | 147 |
| 7 | Srimali Divisekara Mudiyanselage (SRI) | A | 61 | ~~63~~ | ~~63~~ | 9 | ~~83~~ | 83 | ~~87~~ | 6 | 144 |
| 8 | Bianca Dumitrescu (ROU) | A | ~~62~~ | 62 | ~~65~~ | 8 | ~~78~~ | 78 | 80 | 8 | 142 |
| 9 | Abdulrahman Al-Tassan Ghadah (KSA) | A | 45 | ~~50~~ | 50 | 10 | 58 | 59 | ~~64~~ | 10 | 109 |
| — | Batnasangiin Tungalag (MGL) | A | ~~67~~ | ~~67~~ | ~~67~~ | — | ~~75~~ | 75 | ~~81~~ | 9 | — |
| — | Hong Zi-yu (TPE) | A | 66 | 69 | ~~71~~ | 5 | ~~85~~ | ~~85~~ | ~~86~~ | — | — |
| — | Janet Oduor (KEN) | A | Did not start | | | | | | | | |
