= İbrahim Arat =

Turkish weightlifter (born 1988)

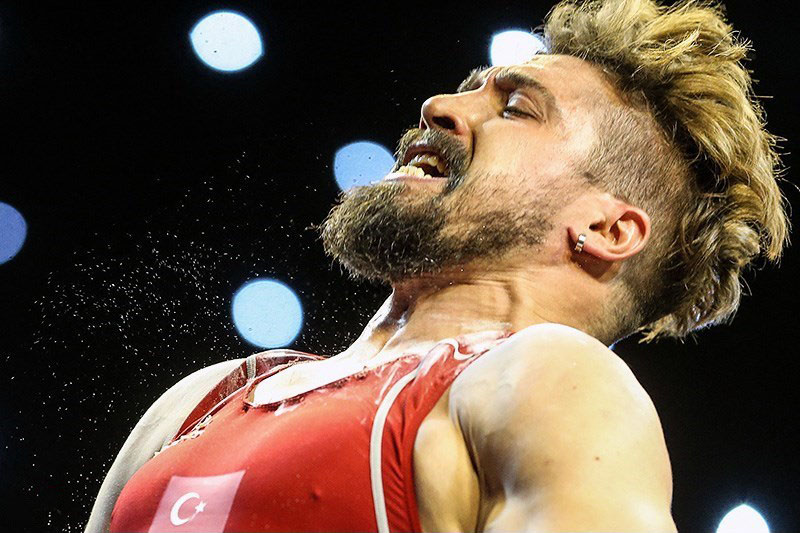

Personal information
- Nationality: Turkish
- Born: December 2, 1988 (age 37) İzmir, Turkey
- Height: 1.79 m (5 ft 10 in)
- Weight: 94 kg (207 lb; 14.8 st)

Sport
- Country: Turkey
- Sport: Weightlifting
- Event: –94 kg
- Club: İzmir Büyükşehir Belediyespor
- Coached by: Mücahit Yağcı and Selim Savaş
Medal record
Summer Universiade
Bronze medal – third place	2011 Shenzhen	–94 kg

İbrahim Arat (born December 2, 1988) is a Turkish weightlifter competing in the –94 kg division. The 1.79 m (5 ft 10 in) tall athlete is a member of İzmir Büyükşehir Belediyespor in his hometown, where he is coached by Mücahit Yağcı and Selim Savaş.

At the 2011 Summer Universiade held in Shenzhen, China, he became bronze medalist.

Arat qualified for participation at the 2012 Summer Olympics but was withdrawn after his A-sample tested positive for hydroxystanozolol during a drug test. He was suspended for 2 years.

== Achievements ==
Rank			Competition	Host	Result
S	C	T	Competition	Host	Result
Bronze medal	8	6	2008 World Junior Championships	Cali, Colombia	150+175=325
5	9	6	2010 European U23 Championships	Limassol, Cyprus	161+180=341
Bronze medal	4	Bronze medal	2011 Summer Universiade	Shenzhen, China	170+203=373
17	14	16	2011 World Championships	Paris, France	165+206=371
Silver medal	4	Bronze medal	2012 European Championships	Antalya, Turkey	171+209=380
