= Weightlifting at the 2026 Central American and Caribbean Games =

- Venue: Pabellon de Pesas José Joaquín Puello
- Location: Santo Domingo, Dominican Republic
- Dates: 5–8 August

The weightlifting competition at the 2026 Central American and Caribbean Games was held in Santo Domingo, Dominican Republic, from 5 to 8 August 2026 at the Pabellon de Pesas José Joaquín Puello.

== Medal table ==
* Host nation (Dominican Republic)

Rank	Nation	Gold	Silver	Bronze	Total
1	Colombia (COL)	13	2	5	20
2	Venezuela (VEN)	11	8	3	22
3	Mexico (MEX)	4	10	5	19
4	Dominican Republic (DOM)*	2	7	9	18
5	Cuba (CUB)	2	3	5	10
6	Nicaragua (NCA)	0	2	1	3
7	Puerto Rico (PUR)	0	0	3	3
8	El Salvador (ESA)	0	0	1	1
Totals (8 entries)		32	32	32	96

== Medal summary ==
=== Men's events ===
Event		Gold		Silver		Bronze	
60 kg	Snatch	Duván Ferrer; Colombia	123 kg	Otto Oñate; Cuba	121 kg	Luís García; Dominican Republic	119 kg
60 kg	Clean & Jerk	Otto Oñate; Cuba	158 kg	Luís García; Dominican Republic	153 kg	Duván Ferrer; Colombia	146 kg
65 kg	Snatch	Héctor García; Colombia	130 kg	Orlando Vásquez; Nicaragua	126 kg	Wilkeinner Lugo; Venezuela	126 kg
65 kg	Clean & Jerk	Wilkeinner Lugo; Venezuela	166 kg	Orlando Vásquez; Nicaragua	156 kg	Luis González; Puerto Rico	156 kg
71 kg	Snatch	Jorge Cárdenas; Mexico	150 kg	Reinner Arango; Venezuela	150 kg	Francisco Tonton; Dominican Republic	136 kg
71 kg	Clean & Jerk	Reinner Arango; Venezuela	168 kg	Jorge Cárdenas; Mexico	167 kg	Francisco Tonton; Dominican Republic	166 kg
79 kg	Snatch	Julio Mayora; Venezuela	151 kg	Edisnel Corrales; Cuba	150 kg	Juan Martínez; Colombia	146 kg
79 kg	Clean & Jerk	Julio Mayora; Venezuela	193 kg	Juan Martínez; Colombia	187 kg	Edisnel Corrales; Cuba	187 kg
88 kg	Snatch	Yeison López; Colombia	182 kg AM	Ángel Rodríguez; Venezuela	169 kg	Norwin Washington; Nicaragua	161 kg
88 kg	Clean & Jerk	Yeison López; Colombia	204 kg	Ángel Rodríguez; Venezuela	203 kg	Mauricio Canul; Mexico	191 kg
94 kg	Snatch	Keydomar Vallenilla; Venezuela	172 kg	Jonathan Ramos; Mexico	155 kg	Yorelvis Machado; Cuba	147 kg
94 kg	Clean & Jerk	Keydomar Vallenilla; Venezuela	215 kg	Jonathan Ramos; Mexico	196 kg	Yorelvis Machado; Cuba	193 kg
110 kg	Snatch	Josué Medina; Mexico	172 kg	Mauricio Loaiza; Venezuela	171 kg	Marcos Bonilla; Colombia	166 kg
110 kg	Clean & Jerk	Mauricio Loaiza; Venezuela	211 kg	Josué Medina; Mexico	206 kg	Marcos Bonilla; Colombia	205 kg
+110 kg	Snatch	Santiago Cossio; Colombia	190 kg	Karim Saadi; Mexico	171 kg	Ezequiel Germán; Dominican Republic	168 kg
+110 kg	Clean & Jerk	Santiago Cossio; Colombia	220 kg	Karim Saadi; Mexico	206 kg	Ezequiel Germán; Dominican Republic	202 kg

=== Women's events ===
Event		Gold		Silver		Bronze	
48 kg	Snatch	Patricia Mercado; Venezuela	83 kg	Ludia Montero; Cuba	82 kg	July Mendoza; El Salvador	65 kg
48 kg	Clean & Jerk	Dahiana Ortiz; Dominican Republic	100 kg	Patricia Mercado; Venezuela	99 kg	Ludia Montero; Cuba	94 kg
53 kg	Snatch	Andrea de la Herrán; Mexico	88 kg	Katherin Echandía; Venezuela	87 kg	Asia González; Puerto Rico	81 kg
53 kg	Clean & Jerk	Andrea de la Herrán; Mexico	110 kg	Katherin Echandía; Venezuela	109 kg	Julieth Jiménez; Colombia	104 kg
58 kg	Snatch	Génesis Rodríguez; Venezuela	95 kg	Alicia Féliz; Dominican Republic	91 kg	Irene Borrego; Mexico	91 kg
58 kg	Clean & Jerk	Génesis Rodríguez; Venezuela	117 kg	Alicia Féliz; Dominican Republic	116 kg	Issi Agrait; Puerto Rico	111 kg
63 kg	Snatch	Karen Mosquera; Colombia	107 kg	Janeth Gómez; Mexico	98 kg	Nathalia Novas; Dominican Republic	93 kg
63 kg	Clean & Jerk	Karen Mosquera; Colombia	125 kg	Janeth Gómez; Mexico	122 kg	Lisney Adames; Cuba	116 kg
69 kg	Snatch	Julieth Rodríguez; Colombia	111 kg	Fransheska Matías; Dominican Republic	109 kg	Claudia Rengifo; Venezuela	107 kg
69 kg	Clean & Jerk	Julieth Rodríguez; Colombia	137 kg	Fransheska Matías; Dominican Republic	136 kg	Claudia Rengifo; Venezuela	135 kg
77 kg	Snatch	Mari Sánchez; Colombia	112 kg	Aremi Fuentes; Mexico	107 kg	Daiana Serrano; Dominican Republic	106 kg
77 kg	Clean & Jerk	Mari Sánchez; Colombia	140 kg	Aremi Fuentes; Mexico	133 kg	Daiana Serrano; Dominican Republic	130 kg
86 kg	Snatch	Yeinny Geles; Colombia	115 kg	Yudelina Mejía; Dominican Republic	114 kg	Emmy González; Mexico	106 kg
86 kg	Clean & Jerk	Yudelina Mejía; Dominican Republic	140 kg	Yeinny Geles; Colombia	131 kg	Emmy González; Mexico	130 kg
+86 kg	Snatch	Naryury Pérez; Venezuela	122 kg	Crismery Santana; Dominican Republic	118 kg	Laura Jiménez; Mexico	110 kg
+86 kg	Clean & Jerk	Marifélix Sarría; Cuba	153 kg	Naryury Pérez; Venezuela	151 kg	Crismery Santana; Dominican Republic	147 kg
