= 2019 World Weightlifting Championships – Women's 45 kg =

The women's 45 kg competition at the 2019 World Weightlifting Championships was held on 18 September 2019.

== Schedule ==
Date	Time	Event
18 September 2019	14:30	Group B
18 September 2019	20:25	Group A

== Medalists ==
Event	Gold		Silver		Bronze	
Snatch	Şaziye Erdoğan (TUR)	77 kg	Ludia Montero (CUB)	76 kg	Khổng Mỹ Phượng (VIE)	74 kg
Clean & Jerk	Lisa Setiawati (INA)	95 kg	Şaziye Erdoğan (TUR)	92 kg	Vương Thị Huyền (VIE)	91 kg
Total	Şaziye Erdoğan (TUR)	169 kg	Ludia Montero (CUB)	167 kg	Lisa Setiawati (INA)	165 kg

== Records ==
Prior to this competition, the existing world records were as follows.

World record	Snatch	World Standard	85 kg	—	1 November 2018
World record	Clean & jerk	World Standard	108 kg	—	1 November 2018
World record	Total	World Standard	191 kg	—	1 November 2018

== Results ==
Rank	Athlete	Group	Snatch (kg)				Clean & Jerk (kg)				Total
Rank	Athlete	Group	1	2	3	Rank	1	2	3	Rank	Total
1st place, gold medalist(s)	Şaziye Erdoğan (TUR)	A	73	75	77	1st place, gold medalist(s)	90	92	~~96~~	2nd place, silver medalist(s)	169
2nd place, silver medalist(s)	Ludia Montero (CUB)	A	~~74~~	74	76	2nd place, silver medalist(s)	88	91	~~94~~	4	167
3rd place, bronze medalist(s)	Lisa Setiawati (INA)	A	70	~~74~~	~~75~~	7	93	95	~~97~~	1st place, gold medalist(s)	165
4	Vương Thị Huyền (VIE)	A	70	~~73~~	73	4	91	~~93~~	~~93~~	3rd place, bronze medalist(s)	164
5	Khổng Mỹ Phượng (VIE)	A	74	~~76~~	~~78~~	3rd place, bronze medalist(s)	83	~~87~~	87	7	161
6	Rosielis Quintana (VEN)	A	70	~~73~~	~~73~~	6	87	~~90~~	~~93~~	6	157
7	Mary Flor Diaz (PHI)	A	67	70	~~72~~	8	~~86~~	86	~~91~~	8	156
8	Rosina Randafiarison (MAD)	B	65	70	~~72~~	5	85	~~90~~	~~90~~	10	155
9	Nadezhda Panova (RUS)	A	~~64~~	64	67	10	82	~~86~~	86	9	153
10	Ayşe Doğan (TUR)	A	66	68	~~69~~	9	~~80~~	~~80~~	80	12	148
11	Katherine Landeros (CHI)	B	59	62	64	11	79	~~81~~	~~81~~	13	143
12	Daniela Pandova (BUL)	B	~~61~~	61	63	12	79	~~82~~	~~82~~	14	142
13	Tihana Majer (CRO)	B	55	60	~~63~~	13	70	74	76	15	136
14	Yuliya Asayonak (BLR)	B	46	50	54	16	65	70	71	16	125
15	Srity Akter (BAN)	B	53	54	56	15	~~68~~	68	~~71~~	17	124
—	María Navarro (NCA)	B	~~57~~	57	~~63~~	14	~~74~~	~~74~~	~~74~~	—	—
—	Jhilli Dalabehera (IND)	A	~~68~~	~~68~~	~~68~~	—	88	~~92~~	~~93~~	5	—
—	Lee Seul-ki (KOR)	A	~~70~~	~~70~~	~~70~~	—	84	~~88~~	~~88~~	11	—
