= Janeth Gómez =

Mexican weightlifter (born 1997)

Personal information
- Full name: Janeth Gómez Valdivia
- Born: 26 October 1997 (age 28) San Miguel el Alto, Jalisco, Mexico

Janeth Gómez Valdivia (Note: In this Spanish name, the first or paternal surname is Gómez and the second or maternal family name is Valdivia.) (born 26 October 1997) is a Mexican weightlifter. Gomez began weightlifting at age 11, where she was criticized for her physique. Representing Mexico at the 2024 Summer Olympics, Gomez placed eighth in the women's 59kg weightlifting event.
