= Weightlifting at the 2010 Commonwealth Games – Men's +105 kg =

The Men's +105 kg weightlifting event was an event at the weightlifting competition. The competition took place on 11 October. The weightlifter from Australia won the gold, with a combined lift of 397 kg.

== Results ==
Rank	Name	Country	Group	B.weight (kg)	Snatch (kg)	Clean & Jerk (kg)	Total (kg)
1st place, gold medalist(s)	Damon Kelly	Australia	A	149.06	176	221	397
2nd place, silver medalist(s)	Itte Detenamo	Nauru	A	151.90	179	218	397
3rd place, bronze medalist(s)	George Kobaladze	Canada	A	127.29	168	218	386
4	Frederic Fokejou	Cameroon	A	130.78	156	200	356
5	Joe Muskett	England	A	137.22	142	172	314
6	Daniel Nemani	Niue	A	132.75	141	171	312
7	Albert Abotsi	Ghana	A	106.37	115	160	275
8	Kimmit Harvey	Turks and Caicos Islands	A	113.88	90	120	210
–	Corran Hocking	Australia	A	145.18	–	–	DNF
–	Parm Phangura	Canada	A	134.94	–	–	DNF
–	Sarabjit	India	A	143.47	169	–	DNF

== See also ==
- 2010 Commonwealth Games
- Weightlifting at the 2010 Commonwealth Games
