= Nauru at the Commonwealth Games =

Sporting event delegations

- CG code: NRU
- CGA: Nauru Olympic Committee
- Website: oceaniasport.com/nauru
- Medals Ranked 22nd: Gold 10 Silver 11 Bronze 12 Total 33

Commonwealth Games appearances (overview)
- 1990; 1994; 1998; 2002; 2006; 2010; 2014; 2018; 2022; 2026; 2030

Nauru has competed in seven editions of the Commonwealth Games to date, beginning in 1990. This very small country, which had a population of just 9,872 at the time of the 2002 census, succeeded in winning at least one medals on each occasion, including at least one gold in their first four appearances.

Nauru is renowned particularly for weightlifting; all its medals in the Commonwealth Games have been achieved in that field. Apart from runners Frederick Cannon in 1994 and Aneri Canon in 1998, Nauru has only ever sent weightlifters to the Games.

To date, three Nauruans—Reanna Solomon, Marcus Stephen and Yukio Peter—have won gold medals, and a total of eight Nauruans—Reanna Solomon, Marcus Stephen, Yukio Peter, Jalon Renos Doweiya, Ebonette Deigaeruk, Sheba Deireragea, Mary Diranga, Itte Detenamo, and Charisma Amoe-Tarrant—have won medals.

== Medal tally ==
Games	Gold	Silver	Bronze	Total
1990 Auckland	1	2	0	3
1994 Victoria	3	0	0	3
1998 Kuala Lumpur	3	0	0	3
2002 Manchester	2	5	8	15
2006 Melbourne	0	1	1	2
2010 Delhi	1	1	0	2
2014 Glasgow	0	1	0	1
2018 Gold Coast	0	1	0	1
2022 Birmingham	0	0	1	1
2026 Glasgow	0	0	2	2
Total	10	11	12	33

Nauru ranks twenty second on the all-time medal tally of the Commonwealth Games.

== History ==
For its first participation in the Commonwealth Games, in 1990, Nauru sent only one representative, Marcus Stephen, who competed in only three events, all of them in weightlifting. He created a surprise by winning a medal in each of those events, including gold in the Men's 60 kg Snatch.

Stephen competed again in 1994, along with weightlifter Gerard Jones and runner Frederick Cannon. Stephen won his country's only medals – three gold. In 1998, Nauru sent six weightlifters and a runner to the Games, and Stephen again won his country's only medals – again, three gold.

In 2002, Nauru sent a team consisting solely of weightlifters, including the first Nauruan women to represent their country at the Games. For the first time, Stephen failed to win a gold medal, but obtained three silver. Nauru won fifteen medals, ten of which were won by women, including two gold by Reanna Solomon. Six Nauruan weightlifters, an astonishing proportion of the country's population, won medals at the 2002 Games.

In 2006, Stephen did not compete. Nauru failed to win a gold medal for the first time, but weightlifters Sheba Deireragea and Itte Detenamo obtained a silver and a bronze respectively.

In 2007, Marcus Stephen, Nauru's most successful sportsman, became President of the Republic of Nauru. In 2008, he became President of the Oceania Weightlifting Federation.

At the 2010 Games in New Delhi, India, Yukio Peter won a gold medal for Nauru in the 77 kg division in weightlifting with a new Games record of 333 kg. It was the country's tenth gold medal in their history.

At the 2014 Games in Glasgow, Scotland, Itte Detenamo won silver in the +105 kg event, his third medal in consecutive Games.
