= Nauru at the 2014 Commonwealth Games =

- CG code: NRU
- CGA: Nauru Olympic Committee
- Website: oceaniasport.com/nauru

in Glasgow, Scotland
- Competitors: 10 in 4 sports
- Flag bearer: Itte Detenamo
- Medals Ranked =29th: Gold 0 Silver 1 Bronze 0 Total 1

Commonwealth Games appearances (overview)
- 1990; 1994; 1998; 2002; 2006; 2010; 2014; 2018; 2022; 2026; 2030

Nauru competed in the 2014 Commonwealth Games in Glasgow, Scotland from 23 July – 3 August 2014. Nauru's team consisted of ten athletes in four sports. Participating for the seventh time, Nauru, the smallest sovereign state in the Commonwealth of Nations, holds a "remarkable" record at the Commonwealth Games, having won twenty-eight medals during their first six participations, of which ten gold. Weightlifter Yukio Peter, Nauru's only gold medallist at the 2010 Games, did not defending his title in Glasgow, but Delhi weightlifting silver medallist Itte Detenamo was present.

Due to a scheduling conflict between the Commonwealth Games and the 2014 Micronesian Games in Pohnpei, Nauru had to split its delegation between the two events.

== Medalists ==
Medal	Name	Sport	Event	Date
Silver	Itte Detenamo	Weightlifting	Men's +105kg	31 July

== Athletics ==
Two athletes represented the country.

Key

- Note – Ranks given for track events are for the entire round
- Q = Qualified for the next round
- q = Qualified for the next round as a fastest loser or, in field events, by position without achieving the qualifying target
- NR = National record
- DQ = Disqualification
- N/A = Round not applicable for the event
- Bye = Athlete not required to compete in round

Athlete	Event	Round 1		Semifinal		Final	
Athlete	Event	Result	Rank	Result	Rank	Result	Rank
Joshua Jeremiah	Men's 100 m	11.46	68	did not advance			
Lovelite Detenamo	Women's 100 m	DQ		did not advance			

== Boxing ==
Three boxers represented the country.

Men

Athlete	Event	Round of 32	Round of 16	Quarterfinals	Semifinals	Final	
Athlete	Event	Opposition Result	Opposition Result	Opposition Result	Opposition Result	Opposition Result	Rank
Mathew Martin	Bantamweight	Conlan (NIR); L 0–3	did not advance				
Alfonse Deireragea	Lightweight	Bye	Okoth (KEN); L 0–3	did not advance			
Joseph Deireragea	Welterweight	Mohammed (GHA); L 0–3	did not advance				

== Judo ==
One judoka represented Nauru.

Men

Athlete	Event	Round of 16	Quarterfinal	Semifinal	Repechage 1	Repechage 2	Final / BM	
Athlete	Event	Opposition Result	Opposition Result	Opposition Result	Opposition Result	Opposition Result	Opposition Result	Rank
Sled Dowabobo	−73 kg	did not start						

== Weightlifting ==
Four weightlifters represented the country.

Men

Athlete	Event	Snatch		Clean & Jerk		Total	Rank
Athlete	Event	Result	Rank	Result	Rank	Total	Rank
Elson Brechtfeld	−62 kg	105	15	141	10	246	13
Chris Rangidimi	−69 kg	NM		did not finish			
Tom-Jaye Waibeiya	−77 kg	105	21	145	14	250	18
Itte Detenamo	+105 kg	174	1	222	2	396	2nd place, silver medalist(s)
