= Nauru at the 2010 Commonwealth Games =

- CG code: NRU
- CGA: Nauru Olympic Committee
- Website: oceaniasport.com/nauru

in Delhi, India
- Competitors: 6 in 2 sports
- Medals Ranked 17th: Gold 1 Silver 1 Bronze 0 Total 2

Commonwealth Games appearances (overview)
- 1990; 1994; 1998; 2002; 2006; 2010; 2014; 2018; 2022; 2026; 2030

Nauru took part in the 2010 Commonwealth Games in Delhi, sending six athletes to compete in boxing and weightlifting. Nauru has won medals in every edition of the Commonwealth Games since it first took part in 1990, and in particular won fifteen medals in weightlifting at the 2002 Games in Manchester.

In 2010, Nauruans won two medals, a gold and a silver, both in weightlifting. Yukio Peter won gold in the men's 77 kg category, setting a new Commonwealth Games record by lifting 148 kg in the snatch and 185 kg in the clean and jerk – 333 kg in total. In the men's 105+ kg, Itte Detenamo won silver. He lifted 179 kg in the snatch and 218 kg in the clean and jerk – 397 kg in total. This equalled the total lifted by Australia's Damon Kelly, but Kelly won gold by virtue of a lesser body weight, leaving Detenamo with silver.

== Medals ==
	(gold)	(silver)	(bronze)	Total
Nauru	1	1	0	2

== Medalists ==
Medal	Name	Sport	Event	Date
Gold	Yukio Peter	Weightlifting	Men's 77 kg	October 7
Silver	Itte Detenamo	Weightlifting	Men's 105+ kg	October 7

== Boxing ==
Nauru sent 4 boxers.

- Colan Caleb
- Joseph Deireragea
- Lad Agege
- Jake Ageidu

== Weightlifting ==
Weightlifting is Nauru's strongest sport. Yukio Peter won the island's 10th Commonwealth gold.

Men

Athlete	Event	Snatch		Clean & Jerk		Total	Rank
Athlete	Event	Result	Rank	Result	Rank	Total	Rank
Yukio Peter	77 kg	148 kg	-	185 kg	-	333 kg	1
Itte Detenamo	+105 kg	179 kg	-	218 kg	-	397 kg	2

== See also ==
- 2010 Commonwealth Games
