= Weightlifting at the 2018 Commonwealth Games – Men's +105 kg =

Weightlifting – Men's +105 kg at the 2018 Commonwealth Games
- Venue: Carrara Sports and Leisure Centre
- Dates: 9 April 2018
- Competitors: 13 from 13 nations
- Winning total weight: 403

Medalists
gold medal	David Liti	New Zealand
silver medal	Lauititi Lui	Samoa
bronze medal	Muhammad Nooh Dastgir Butt	Pakistan

The Men's +105 kg weightlifting event at the 2018 Commonwealth Games took place at the Carrara Sports and Leisure Centre on 9 April 2018. The weightlifter from New Zealand won the gold, with a combined lift of 403 kg. Samoa and Pakistan claimed the silver and bronze, respectively,

== Records ==
Prior to this competition, the existing world, Commonwealth and Games records were as follows:

World record	Snatch	Lasha Talakhadze (GEO)	220 kg	Anaheim, United States	5 December 2017
World record	Clean & Jerk	Hossein Rezazadeh (IRI)	263 kg	Athens, Greece	25 August 2004
World record	Total	Lasha Talakhadze (GEO)	477 kg	Anaheim, United States	5 December 2017
Commonwealth record	Snatch	Itte Detenamo (NRU)	184 kg	Darwin, Australia	13 May 2011
Commonwealth record	Clean & Jerk	Itte Detenamo (NRU)	229 kg	Darwin, Australia	13 May 2011
Commonwealth record	Total	Itte Detenamo (NRU)	413 kg	Darwin, Australia	13 May 2011
Games record	Snatch	Giles Greenwood (ENG)	180 kg	Manchester, England	3 August 2002
Games record	Clean & Jerk	George Kobaladze (CAN)	229 kg	Glasgow, Scotland	31 July 2014
Games record	Total	George Kobaladze (CAN)	400 kg	Glasgow, Scotland	31 July 2014

The following records were established during the competition:

Total	403 kg	David Liti (NZL)	GR

== Schedule ==
All times are Australian Eastern Standard Time (UTC+10)

Date	Time	Round
Monday, 9 April 2018	18:42	Final

== Results ==
Rank	Athlete	Body weight (kg)	Snatch (kg)				Clean & Jerk (kg)				Total
Rank	Athlete	Body weight (kg)	1	2	3	Result	1	2	3	Result	Total
1st place, gold medalist(s)	David Liti (NZL)	165.15	166	~~167~~	174	174	220	~~227~~	229	229	403 GR
2nd place, silver medalist(s)	Lauititi Lui (SAM)	138.81	175	~~179~~	~~179~~	175	215	225	~~228~~	225	400
3rd place, bronze medalist(s)	Muhammad Nooh Dastgir Butt (PAK)	156.06	173	~~177~~	~~177~~	173	222	~~228~~	~~231~~	222	395
4	Gurdeep Singh (IND)	144.29	168	~~175~~	175	175	~~207~~	207	~~218~~	207	382
5	Damon Kelly (AUS)	154.91	158	~~163~~	~~163~~	158	185	195	205	205	363
6	Ben Watson (ENG)	115.89	~~155~~	155	160	160	185	192	~~200~~	192	352
7	Miklos Bencsik (CAN)	137.35	140	~~145~~	145	145	190	196	200	200	345
8	Ushan Charuka (SRI)	151.48	137	142	~~145~~	142	175	182	187	187	329
9	Mohamad Norfarhan Ideris (MAS)	111.02	~~140~~	141	~~146~~	141	180	185	~~192~~	185	326
10	Rhodri West (WAL)	111.58	~~130~~	130	135	135	165	170	~~175~~	170	305
11	Cameron Montgomery (NIR)	118.87	95	~~100~~	103	103	135	140	146	146	249
12	Dhunanjoy Alvin Jooron (MRI)	106.98	100	~~105~~	105	105	135	140	~~146~~	140	245
	Itte Detenamo (NRU)	161.95	~~160~~	~~160~~	~~160~~	—					DNF
