= Weightlifting at the 2006 Commonwealth Games – Women's 75 kg =

Weightlifting – Women's 75 kg at the 2006 Commonwealth Games
- Venue: Melbourne Exhibition Centre
- Dates: 21 March 2006
- Competitors: 6 from 6 nations
- Winning total weight: 208

Medalists
gold medal	Deborah Lovely	Australia
silver medal	Sheba Deireragea	Nauru
bronze medal	Babalwa Ndleleni	South Africa

The Women's 75 kg weightlifting event at the 2006 Commonwealth Games took place at the Melbourne Exhibition Centre on 21 March 2006. The weightlifter from Australia won the gold, lifting a total weight of 208 kg.

== Schedule ==
All times are Australian Eastern Standard Time (UTC+10)

Date	Time	Event
21 March 2006	18:30	Group A

== Records ==
Prior to this competition, the existing world, Commonwealth and Games records were as follows:

World record	Snatch	Natalya Zabolotnaya (RUS)	130 kg	Doha, Qatar	13 November 2005
World record	Clean & Jerk	Liu Chunhong (CHN)	159 kg	Doha, Qatar	13 November 2005
World record	Total	Natalya Zabolotnaya (RUS)	285 kg	Doha, Qatar	13 November 2005
Commonwealth record	Snatch				
Commonwealth record	Clean & Jerk	Ruth Ogbeifo (NGR)	140 kg	Sydney, Australia	20 September 2000
Commonwealth record	Total	Ruth Ogbeifo (NGR)	245 kg	Sydney, Australia	20 September 2000
Games record	Snatch	Shailaja Pujari (IND)	97 kg	Manchester, Great Britain	3 August 2002
Games record	Clean & Jerk	Shailaja Pujari (IND)	125 kg	Manchester, Great Britain	3 August 2002
Games record	Total	Shailaja Pujari (IND)	222 kg	Manchester, Great Britain	3 August 2002

== Results ==
Rank	Athlete	Nation	Group	Body weight	Snatch (kg)				Clean & Jerk (kg)				Total
Rank	Athlete	Nation	Group	Body weight	1	2	3	Result	1	2	3	Result	Total
1st place, gold medalist(s)	Deborah Lovely	Australia	A	74.73	~~90~~	90	93	93	108	112	115	115	208
2nd place, silver medalist(s)	Sheba Deireragea	Nauru	A	74.97	85	90	93	93	109	~~113~~	~~113~~	109	202
3rd place, bronze medalist(s)	Babalwa Ndleleni	South Africa	A	74.60	75	~~78~~	78	78	95	100	104	104	182
4	Lindsay Borg	Malta	A	74.60	72	75	~~78~~	75	~~90~~	90	~~98~~	90	165
5	Mariam Nalubanga	Uganda	A	71.29	65	70	~~72~~	70	85	90	~~92~~	90	160
6	Bothobile Shebe	Lesotho	A	72.92	40	~~45~~	~~50~~	40	50	55	60	60	100
