= Weightlifting at the 2008 Summer Olympics – Men's +105 kg =

Men's +105 kg at the Games of the XXIX Olympiad
- Venue: Beihang University Gymnasium
- Date: 19 August 2008
- Competitors: 14 from 12 nations

Medalists
1st place, gold medalist(s)		Matthias Steiner	Germany
2nd place, silver medalist(s)		Evgeny Chigishev	Russia
3rd place, bronze medalist(s)		Viktors Ščerbatihs	Latvia

The Men's +105 kilograms weightlifting event was the heaviest men's event at the 2008 Summer Olympics weightlifting competition, allowing competitors of over 105 kilograms of body mass. The whole competition took place on August 19, but was divided in two parts due to the number of competitors. Group B weightlifters competed at 15:30, and Group A, at 19:00. This event was the fifteenth and last weightlifting event to conclude.

Each lifter performed in both the snatch and clean and jerk lifts, with the final score being the sum of the lifter's best result in each. The athlete received three attempts in each of the two lifts; the score for the lift was the heaviest weight successfully lifted.

== Schedule ==
All times are China Standard Time (UTC+08:00)

Date	Time	Event
19 August 2008	15:30	Group B
19 August 2008	19:00	Group A

== Records ==
Prior to this competition, the existing world and Olympic records were as follows.

World Record	Snatch	Hossein Rezazadeh (IRI)	213 kg	Qinhuangdao, China	14 September 2003
World Record	Clean & Jerk	Hossein Rezazadeh (IRI)	263 kg	Athens, Greece	25 August 2004
World Record	Total	Hossein Rezazadeh (IRI)	472 kg	Sydney, Australia	26 September 2000
Olympic Record	Snatch	Hossein Rezazadeh (IRI)	212 kg	Sydney, Australia	26 September 2000
Olympic Record	Clean & Jerk	Hossein Rezazadeh (IRI)	263 kg	Athens, Greece	25 August 2004
Olympic Record	Total	Hossein Rezazadeh (IRI)	472 kg	Sydney, Australia	26 September 2000

== Results ==
Rank	Athlete	Group	Body weight	Snatch (kg)				Clean & Jerk (kg)				Total
Rank	Athlete	Group	Body weight	1	2	3	Result	1	2	3	Result	Total
1st place, gold medalist(s)	Matthias Steiner (GER)	A	145.93	198	203	~~207~~	203	~~246~~	248	258	258	461
2nd place, silver medalist(s)	Evgeny Chigishev (RUS)	A	124.13	200	205	210	210	240	247	250	250	460
3rd place, bronze medalist(s)	Viktors Ščerbatihs (LAT)	A	144.97	198	203	206	206	242	~~244~~	~~257~~	242	448
4	Artem Udachyn (UKR)	A	144.09	197	203	207	207	~~235~~	235	~~241~~	235	442
5	Ihor Shymechko (UKR)	A	130.25	193	197	201	201	217	227	232	232	433
6	Rashid Sharifi (IRI)	B	142.89	188	192	196	196	230	~~238~~	~~238~~	230	426
7	Grzegorz Kleszcz (POL)	A	131.16	~~185~~	185	~~190~~	185	~~232~~	~~234~~	234	234	419
8	Almir Velagić (GER)	B	132.16	180	184	188	188	220	225	~~230~~	225	413
9	Damon Kelly (AUS)	B	154.15	165	~~170~~	~~170~~	165	~~211~~	211	221	221	386
10	Itte Detenamo (NRU)	B	148.48	165	170	175	175	205	210	~~215~~	210	385
11	Antti Everi (FIN)	B	130.04	~~166~~	166	171	171	195	~~201~~	~~201~~	195	366
12	Sam Pera (COK)	B	122.96	148	~~155~~	155	155	~~188~~	188	195	195	350
13	Maamaloa Lolohea (TGA)	B	135.13	127	135	140	140	173	~~185~~	~~185~~	173	313
—	Jeon Sang-guen (KOR)	A	155.49	~~195~~	~~195~~	~~195~~	—	—	—	—	—	—
