= Nauru at the 2018 Commonwealth Games =

- Flag of Nauru
- CG code: NRU
- CGA: Nauru Olympic Committee
- Website: oceaniasport.com/nauru

in Gold Coast, Australia 4 April 2018 – 15 April 2018
- Competitors: 16 in 4 sports
- Flag bearer: Itte Detenamo (opening)
- Medals Ranked 34th: Gold 0 Silver 1 Bronze 0 Total 1

Commonwealth Games appearances (overview)
- 1990; 1994; 1998; 2002; 2006; 2010; 2014; 2018; 2022; 2026; 2030

Nauru competed at the 2018 Commonwealth Games in the Gold Coast, Australia from 4 April to 15 April 2018.

Weightlifter Itte Detenamo was the island's flag bearer during the opening ceremony.

== Medalists ==
Medal	Name	Sport	Event	Date
Silver	Charisma Amoe-Tarrant	Weightlifting	Women's +90 kg	April 9

== Competitors ==
The following is the list of number of competitors participating at the Games per sport/discipline.

Sport	Men	Women	Total
Athletics	1	1	2
Boxing	2	0	2
Weightlifting	6	4	10
Wrestling	2	0	2
Total	11	5	16

== Athletics ==
Nauru participated with 2 athletes (1 man and 1 woman).

Men
Track & road events

Athlete	Event	Heat		Semifinal		Final	
Athlete	Event	Result	Rank	Result	Rank	Result	Rank
Jonah Harris	100 m	10.95	5	did not advance			
Jonah Harris	200 m	21.96	5	did not advance			

Women
Field events

Athlete	Event	Qualification		Final	
Athlete	Event	Distance	Position	Distance	Position
Chanana Jeremiah	Shot put	10.12	14	did not advance	
Chanana Jeremiah	Discus throw	—N/a		NM	

== Boxing ==
Nauru participated with a team of 2 athletes (2 men).

Men

Athlete	Event	Round of 32	Round of 16	Quarterfinals	Semifinals	Final	Rank
Athlete	Event	Opposition Result	Opposition Result	Opposition Result	Opposition Result	Opposition Result	Rank
Yachen Cook	−52 kg	—N/a	Vidanalange Bandara (SRI); L 2 - 3	did not advance			
Colan Caleb	−60 kg	BYE	Nathaniel Collins (SCO); L 2 - 3	did not advance			

== Weightlifting ==
Nauru participated with 10 athletes (6 men and 4 women).

Men

Athlete	Event	Snatch		Clean & Jerk		Total	Rank
Athlete	Event	Result	Rank	Result	Rank	Total	Rank
Elson Brechtefeld	−56 kg	100	6	130	5	230	5
Ezekiel Moses	−62 kg	100	13	134	11	234	12
Larko Doguape	−69 kg	107	12	140	8	247	8
Ika Aliklik	−77 kg	128	9	160	7	288	9
Tom-Jaye Weibeiya	−85 kg	120	11	170	9	290	11
Itte Detenamo	+105 kg	did not finish		did not start			

Women

Athlete	Event	Snatch		Clean & Jerk		Total	Rank
Athlete	Event	Result	Rank	Result	Rank	Total	Rank
Liebon Akua	−53 kg	58	13	did not finish			
Maximina Uepa	−63 kg	77	9	93	8	170	8
Ricci Daniel	−69 kg	63	13	84	13	147	13
Charisma Amoe-Tarrant	+90 kg	101	4	142	1	243	2nd place, silver medalist(s)

== Wrestling ==
Nauru participated with 2 athletes (2 men).

Men

Athlete	Event	Round of 16	Quarterfinal	Semifinal	Repechage	Final / BM	
Athlete	Event	Opposition Result	Opposition Result	Opposition Result	Opposition Result	Opposition Result	Rank
Lowe Bingham	-57 kg	Cicchini (AUS); L 1 - 3	did not advance				9
Maverick Kun	-65 kg	Bye	Bandou (MRI); L 0 - 4	did not advance			11

== See also ==
- Nauru at the 2018 Summer Youth Olympics
