= Weightlifting at the 2011 Pan American Games – Men's +105 kg =

Weightlifting – Men's +105 kg at the 2011 Pan American Games
- Venue: Weightlifting Forum
- Dates: October 27
- Competitors: 10 from 10 nations

Medalists
Gold medal	Fernando Reis	Brazil
Silver medal	Yoel Morales	Venezuela
Bronze medal	George Kobaladze	Canada

The men's +105 kg competition of the weightlifting events at the 2011 Pan American Games in Guadalajara, Mexico, was held on October 27 at the Weightlifting Forum. The defending champion was Cristián Escalante from Chile. Escalante was scheduled to compete, however withdrew after testing positive for drugs.

Each lifter performed in both the snatch and clean and jerk lifts, with the final score being the sum of the lifter's best result in each. The athlete received three attempts in each of the two lifts; the score for the lift was the heaviest weight successfully lifted. This weightlifting event was the heaviest men's event at the weightlifting competition, limiting competitors to unlimited amount of kilograms of body mass.

== Schedule ==
All times are Central Standard Time (UTC-6).

Date	Time	Round
October 27, 2011	16:00	Final

== Results ==
10 athletes from 10 countries took part.

- PR – Pan American Games record

Rank	Name	Country	Group	B.weight (kg)	Snatch (kg)	Clean & Jerk (kg)	Total (kg)
1st place, gold medalist(s)	Fernando Reis	Brazil	A	132.06	185 PR	225 PR	410 PR
2nd place, silver medalist(s)	Yoel Morales	Venezuela	A	127.44	168	225	393
3rd place, bronze medalist(s)	George Kobaladze	Canada	A	131.45	170	223	393
4	Julio Arteaga	Ecuador	A	135.49	170	220	390
5	Sertanis Teran	Cuba	A	121.72	174	215	389
6	Carlos Campos	Costa Rica	A	126.64	166	215	381
7	Christian López	Guatemala	A	133.64	175	206	381
8	Patrick Mendes	United States	A	125.28	175	205	380
9	Hector Rizo	Mexico	A	132.86	150	180	330
–	Fredy Renteria	Colombia	A	150.15			DNF

== New records ==
The following records were established and improved upon during the competition.

Snatch	181.0 kg	Fernando Reis (BRA)	PR
Snatch	185.0 kg	Fernando Reis (BRA)	PR
Clean & Jerk	223.0 kg	George Kobaladze (CAN)	PR
Clean & Jerk	225.0 kg	Fernando Reis (BRA)	PR
Total	410.0 kg	Fernando Reis (BRA)	PR
