= Nauru at the 2026 Commonwealth Games =

- Flag of Nauru
- CG code: NRU
- CGA: Nauru Olympic Committee
- Website: oceaniasport.com/nauru

in Glasgow, Scotland 23 July 2026 – 2 August 2026
- Competitors: 13 in 4 sports
- Flag bearer: Femily-Crystie Notte
- Baton bearer: Winzar Kakiouea
- Medals Ranked =33rd: Gold 0 Silver 0 Bronze 2 Total 2

Commonwealth Games appearances (overview)
- 1990; 1994; 1998; 2002; 2006; 2010; 2014; 2018; 2022; 2026; 2030

Nauru was represented at the 2026 Commonwealth Games in Glasgow, Scotland by the Nauru Olympic Committee. Glasgow 2026 marked the 10th occasion that Nauru had competed at the Commonwealth Games following its debut at the 1990 Commonwealth Games in Auckland, New Zealand.

In total, 13 athletes including nine men and four women represented Nauru in four different sports including athletics, boxing, judo and weightlifting.

Nauru won two medals at the Games after Ezekiel Moses and Femily-Crystie Notte both claimed bronze in the men's weightlifting 71 kg category and women's weightlifting 63 kg category respectively.

== Background ==
In the run-up to the games, the King's Baton Relay stopped in Nauru between 14 and 19 January 2026 as part of the Oceanian leg of the relay. Unlike previous games, each Commonwealth Games Association received an individual baton crafted in Glasgow which they were permitted to customise to reflect local culture.

Originally, 14 athletes from Nauru were due to compete. However, on the eve of the Games, boxer Christon Amram was withdrawn after gender testing results were not received on time.

The 2026 Commonwealth Games marked Nauru's 10th participation at the games, after making its debut at the 1990 Commonwealth Games in Auckland, New Zealand.

=== Opening ceremony ===
Weightlifter Femily-Crystie Notte was selected as Nauru's flagbearer for the opening ceremony and sprinter Winzar Kakiouea was selected as the baton bearer.

== Competitors ==
In total, 13 athletes represented Nauru at the 2026 Commonwealth Games in Glasgow, Scotland across four different sports.

Sport	Men	Women	Total
Athletics	2	1	3
Boxing	2	0	2
Judo	2	0	2
Weightlifting	3	3	6
Total	9	4	13

== Medallists ==
Nauru won two bronze medals at the games, both in weightlifting. On July 27, Ezekiel Moses claimed bronze in the men's 71 kg category. The following day, 17-year-old Femily-Crystie Notte won bronze in the women's 63 kg category.

Medal	Name(s)	Sport	Event	Date	Ref.
Bronze	Ezekiel Moses	Weightlifting	Men's 71 kg	July 27	
Bronze	Femily-Crystie Notte	Weightlifting	Women's 63 kg	July 28	

== Athletics ==
In total, three dei-Naoero athletes participated in the athletics events – Jonathan-Deiwea Detageouwa, Wena Gobure and Winzar Kakiouea.

Key

Ranks given for track events are within the athlete's heat only.

- q=Qualified for the next round as a fastest loser or, in field events, by position without achieving the qualifying target

Track events
Athlete	Event	Heat		Semifinal		Final	
Athlete	Event	Result	Rank	Result	Rank	Result	Rank
Winzar Kakiouea	Men's 100 m	11.04	6	Did not advance			
Wena Gobure	Women's 100 m	13.40	6	Did not advance			

Field events
Athlete	Event	Qualification		Final	
Athlete	Event	Distance	Rank	Distance	Rank
Jonathan-Deiwea Detageouwa	Men's shot put	16.84 SB	10 q	16.99 SB	10

== Boxing ==
In total, two dei-Naoero athletes participated in the boxing events – Marvelous-Marvin Canon and Vi-J Tebouwa.

Athlete	Event	Preliminaries	Preliminaries	Quarterfinal	Semifinal	Final	
Athlete	Event	Opposition Result	Opposition Result	Opposition Result	Opposition Result	Opposition Result	Rank
Marvelous-Marvin Canon	55 kg	Valerie (MRI); L 0–5	Did not advance				
Vi-J Tebouwa	65 kg	Church (SCO); L 0–5	Did not advance				

== Judo ==
In total, two dei-Naoero athletes participated in the judo events – Daraidun Canon and Hamray Temaki.

Athlete	Event	Round of 32	Round of 16	Quarterfinals	Semifinals	Repechage	Final/BM
Athlete	Event	Opposition Result	Opposition Result	Opposition Result	Opposition Result	Opposition Result	Rank
Daraidun Canon	66 kg	Bye	Middleton (AUS); L 000s2–003	Did not advance			
Hamray Temaki	73 kg	Bye	Short (SCO); L 000–100	Did not advance			

== Weightlifting ==
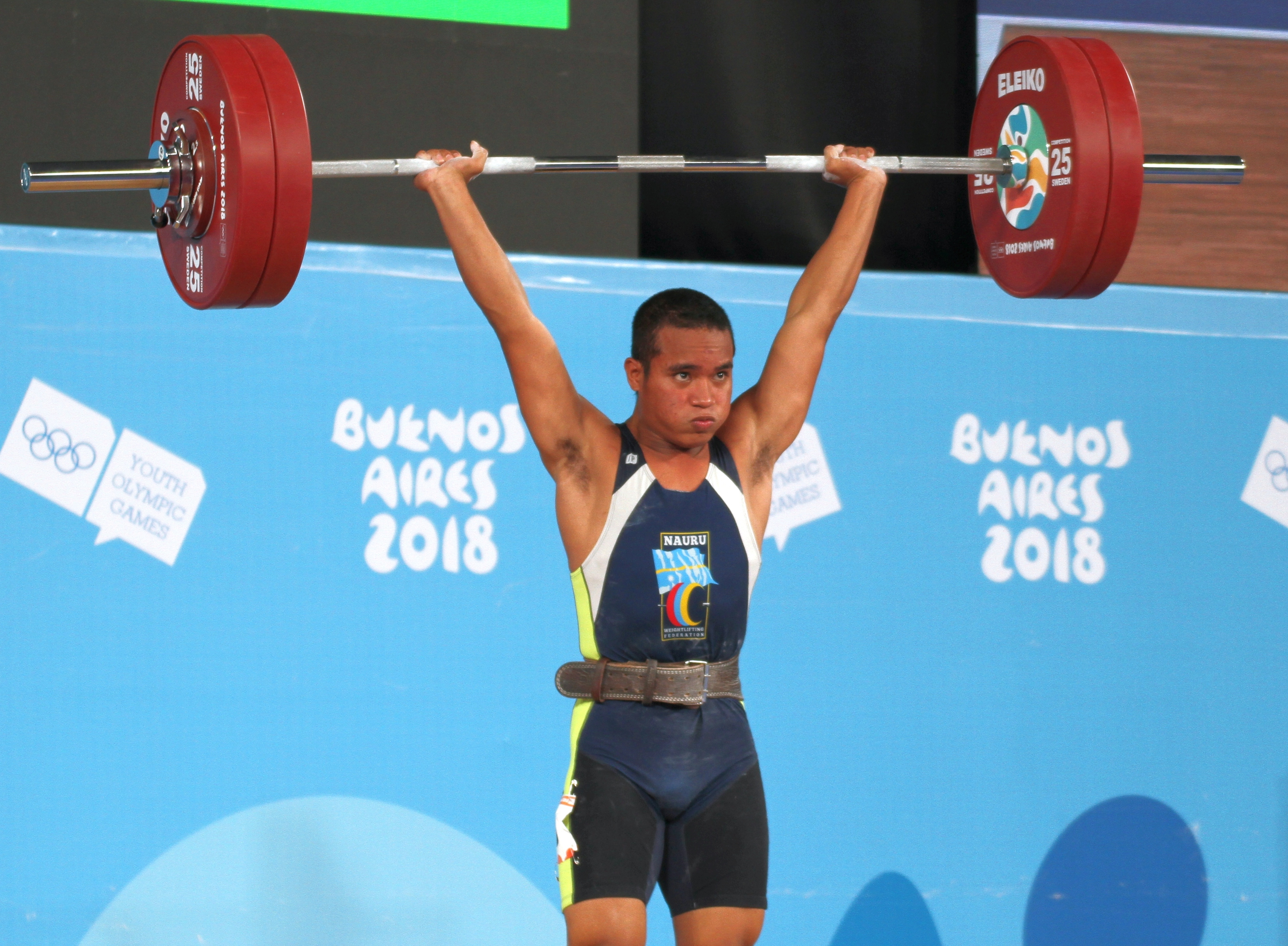
Ezekiel Moses (pictured here in 2018), won Nauru's first medal – a bronze in the men's 71 kg event

In total, six dei-Naoero athletes participated in the weightlifting events – Johannes Adam, Marcincy Cook, Jo-Beth Deireragea, Margaret Bless Harris, Ezekiel Moses and Femily-Crystie Notte. Originally, only four athletes had qualified but Nauru later received two reallocated quotas in the men's 88 kg and women's 58 kg events.

Athlete	Event	Snatch (kg)		Clean & Jerk (kg)		Total (kg)	Rank
Athlete	Event	Result	Rank	Result	Rank	Total (kg)	Rank
Johannes Adam	Men's 60 kg	100	=7	NM		DNF	
Ezekiel Moses	Men's 71 kg	140	3	170	=3	310	(bronze)
Marcincy Cook	Men's 88 kg	130	10	160	9	290	9
Jo-Beth Deireragea	Women's 48 kg	70	=5	91	3	161	4
Margaret Bless Harris	Women's 58 kg	65	10	75	10	140	10
Femily-Crystie Notte	Women's 63 kg	100	2	116	3	216	(bronze)
