= Nauru at the 1998 Commonwealth Games =

- CG code: NRU
- CGA: Nauru Olympic Committee
- Website: oceaniasport.com/nauru

in Kuala Lumpur, Malaysia
- Competitors: 7 in 2 sports
- Medals Ranked 12th: Gold 3 Silver 0 Bronze 0 Total 3

Commonwealth Games appearances (overview)
- 1990; 1994; 1998; 2002; 2006; 2010; 2014; 2018; 2022; 2026; 2030

Nauru was represented at the 1998 Commonwealth Games in Kuala Lumpur by a team consisting in six weight-lifters (Isca Kam, Kemp Detenamo, Gerard Garabwan, Marcus Stephen, Daniel Diringa, and Rodin Thoma) and one runner, Aneri Canon. Marcus Stephen, who became President of Nauru nine years later, competed for the third time and won his country's only medals of the 1998 Games. There were no female competitors for Nauru, by contrast with the 2002 Games, in which women won ten of Nauru's fifteen medals, including its two gold.

== Medals ==
	(gold)	(silver)	(bronze)	Total
Nauru	3	0	0	0

== Medalists ==
=== Gold medalists ===
- Peter Erevu, Weightlifting, Men's 62 kg Clean and Jerk
- Marcus Stephen, Weightlifting, Men's 62 kg Combined
- Marcus Stephen, Weightlifting, Men's 62 kg Snatch

=== Silver medalists ===
none

=== Bronze medalists ===
none

== Sources ==
- Official results
