= Nauru at the 1994 Commonwealth Games =

- CG code: NRU
- CGA: Nauru Olympic Committee
- Website: oceaniasport.com/nauru

in Victoria, British Columbia, Canada
- Competitors: 3 in 2 sports
- Medals Ranked 11th: Gold 3 Silver 0 Bronze 0 Total 3

Commonwealth Games appearances (overview)
- 1990; 1994; 1998; 2002; 2006; 2010; 2014; 2018; 2022; 2026; 2030

Nauru at the 1994 Commonwealth Games was abbreviated NRU.

The 1994 Games in Victoria, British Columbia, Canada marked Nauru's second participation in the Commonwealth Games. The small country was represented by three athletes: weightlifter Marcus Stephen, weightlifter Gerard Jones, and runner Frederick Cannon.

Stephen, who later became his country's President in 2007, won three gold medals. He had previously won a gold and two silvers in the 1990 Games. He would go on to win three gold in 1998, and three silver in 2002.

== Medals ==
	Gold	Silver	Bronze	Total
Nauru	3	0	0	3

== Medalists ==
=== Gold ===
- Marcus Stephen — Weightlifting, Men's Bantamweight Combined
- Marcus Stephen — Weightlifting, Men's Bantamweight Snatch
- Marcus Stephen — Weightlifting, Men's Bantamweight Clean and Jerk

=== Silver ===
- none

=== Bronze ===
- none
