= Weightlifting at the 2014 Commonwealth Games – Men's +105 kg =

Commonwealth Games event

Weightlifting – Men's +105 kg at the 2014 Commonwealth Games
- Venue: Clyde Auditorium
- Dates: 31 July 2014
- Competitors: 12 from 10 nations
- Winning total weight: 400 kg GR

Medalists
gold medal	George Kobaladze	Canada
silver medal	Itte Detenamo	Nauru
bronze medal	Damon Kelly	Australia

The Men's +105 kg event was the heaviest men's weightlifting event at the 2014 Commonwealth Games. The competition took place on 31 July at 15:30 at the Clyde Auditorium. The weightlifter from Canada won the gold, with a combined lift of 400 kg.

== Result ==
Rank	Athlete	Snatch (kg)				Clean & Jerk (kg)				Total
Rank	Athlete	1	2	3	Result	1	2	3	Result	Total
1st place, gold medalist(s)	George Kobaladze (CAN)	167	171	~~176~~	171	216	223	229	229	400 GR
2nd place, silver medalist(s)	Itte Detenamo (NRU)	170	174	~~177~~	174	216	222	~~229~~	222	396
3rd place, bronze medalist(s)	Damon Kelly (AUS)	164	168	171	171	203	~~212~~	217	217	388
4	Darius Jokarzadeh (WAL)	165	~~175~~	~~175~~	165	196	~~212~~	~~212~~	196	361
5	Gordon Shaw (RSA)	~~160~~	160	~~165~~	160	~~185~~	185	190	190	350
6	Parminder Phangura (CAN)	145	150	~~156~~	150	185	191	~~201~~	191	341
7	Christopher Rae (AUS)	150	156	~~162~~	156	180	~~186~~	-	180	336
8	Lauititi Lui (SAM)	~~135~~	135	140	140	175	181	~~185~~	181	321
9	Daniel Nemani (NIU)	135	~~140~~	145	145	170	176	~~181~~	176	321
10	Lewis Chua (SIN)	127	133	~~136~~	133	175	182	~~185~~	182	315
11	Dung Williams (NGR)	135	~~142~~	~~142~~	135	170	~~175~~	~~175~~	170	305
	Scott Wong (SIN)	130	135	~~140~~	135	~~165~~	~~165~~	~~165~~	—	DNF
