= 2009 World Weightlifting Championships – Men's +105 kg =

The men's competition in the super-heavyweight (+ 105 kg) division was staged on November 29, 2009.

== Schedule ==
Date	Time	Event
29 November 2009	11:00	Group B
29 November 2009	16:00	Group A

== Medalists ==
Event	Gold		Silver		Bronze	
Snatch	Ihor Shymechko (UKR)	202 kg	Artem Udachyn (UKR)	200 kg	An Yong-kwon (KOR)	198 kg
Clean & Jerk	An Yong-kwon (KOR)	247 kg	Artem Udachyn (UKR)	245 kg	Andrey Kozlov (RUS)	231 kg
Total	An Yong-kwon (KOR)	445 kg	Artem Udachyn (UKR)	445 kg	Ihor Shymechko (UKR)	427 kg

== Records ==
Prior to this competition, the existing world records were as follows.

World Record	Snatch	Hossein Rezazadeh (IRI)	213 kg	Qinhuangdao, China	14 September 2003
World Record	Clean & Jerk	Hossein Rezazadeh (IRI)	263 kg	Athens, Greece	25 August 2004
World Record	Total	Hossein Rezazadeh (IRI)	472 kg	Sydney, Australia	26 September 2000

== Results ==
Rank	Athlete	Group	Body weight	Snatch (kg)				Clean & Jerk (kg)				Total
Rank	Athlete	Group	Body weight	1	2	3	Rank	1	2	3	Rank	Total
1st place, gold medalist(s)	An Yong-kwon (KOR)	A	142.23	~~198~~	198	~~206~~	3rd place, bronze medalist(s)	233	240	247	1st place, gold medalist(s)	445
2nd place, silver medalist(s)	Artem Udachyn (UKR)	A	158.90	195	~~200~~	200	2nd place, silver medalist(s)	231	238	245	2nd place, silver medalist(s)	445
3rd place, bronze medalist(s)	Ihor Shymechko (UKR)	A	133.82	197	202	~~206~~	1st place, gold medalist(s)	~~223~~	225	~~230~~	7	427
4	Abdelrahman El-Sayed (EGY)	A	122.15	180	185	~~187~~	5	~~225~~	225	230	4	415
5	Mohamed Ihsan (EGY)	A	149.38	~~180~~	180	185	7	225	230	~~234~~	5	415
6	Almir Velagić (GER)	A	133.72	~~185~~	185	~~190~~	6	223	228	~~231~~	6	413
7	Andrey Kozlov (RUS)	A	145.75	180	~~188~~	~~188~~	8	220	231	~~235~~	3rd place, bronze medalist(s)	411
8	Jiří Orság (CZE)	B	122.95	170	~~175~~	~~177~~	13	210	~~216~~	218	8	388
9	Pat Judge (USA)	B	157.25	160	166	171	11	205	212	217	9	388
10	Bünyamin Sudaş (TUR)	B	116.95	170	~~175~~	~~175~~	12	205	211	216	10	386
11	Petr Sobotka (CZE)	B	151.79	170	~~175~~	~~175~~	14	205	211	~~213~~	13	381
12	Itte Detenamo (NRU)	B	152.93	165	170	~~174~~	15	206	211	~~215~~	14	381
13	Irakli Turmanidze (GEO)	B	112.24	165	170	175	9	~~200~~	200	205	15	380
14	George Kobaladze (CAN)	B	125.05	160	~~166~~	166	16	205	~~212~~	212	12	378
15	Chen Shih-chieh (TPE)	B	131.47	162	~~171~~	~~171~~	17	207	216	~~220~~	11	378
16	Corran Hocking (AUS)	B	151.00	173	~~177~~	~~177~~	10	195	~~200~~	~~200~~	16	368
17	Teemu Roininen (FIN)	B	141.26	~~142~~	142	~~147~~	18	~~183~~	183	~~190~~	17	325
—	Viktors Ščerbatihs (LAT)	A	134.52	195	~~200~~	~~200~~	4	—	—	—	—	—
—	Daniel Dołęga (POL)	B	107.92	~~175~~	~~175~~	~~175~~	—	—	—	—	—	—
—	Jim Gyllenhammar (SWE)	B	128.82	~~170~~	~~170~~	~~170~~	—	—	—	—	—	—
