= Deireragea =

Deireragea is a Nauruan surname. Notable individuals with the surname include:

- Joseph Deireragea (born 1988), Nauruan boxer
- Landon Deireragea (born 1960), Nauruan politician
- Sheba Deireragea (born 1986), Nauruan weightlifter
