= Nauru at the 2022 Commonwealth Games =

- Flag of Nauru
- CG code: NRU
- CGA: Nauru Olympic Committee
- Website: oceaniasport.com/nauru

in Birmingham, England 28 July 2022 – 8 August 2022
- Competitors: 16 (11 men and 5 women) in 5 sports
- Flag bearers: Christon Amram; Maximina Uepa
- Medals Ranked =40th: Gold 0 Silver 0 Bronze 1 Total 1

Commonwealth Games appearances (overview)
- 1990; 1994; 1998; 2002; 2006; 2010; 2014; 2018; 2022; 2026; 2030

Nauru competed at the 2022 Commonwealth Games in Birmingham, England from 28 July to 8 August 2022. It was Nauru's ninth appearance at the Games.

Christon Amram and Maximina Uepa were the country's opening ceremony flagbearers.

Nauru won one bronze medal, ranking the county a tied 40th on the medal table. Flagbearer and weightlifter Maximina Uepa won the bronze medal in the women's 76 kg event. This continued the island nation's streak of winning at least one medal at each edition of the games it has competed in since its debut in 1990.

== Competitors ==
The following is the list of number of competitors participating at the Games per sport/discipline.

| Sport | Men | Women | Total |
|---|---|---|---|
| Athletics | 2 | 1 | 3 |
| Boxing | 2 | 0 | 2 |
| Judo | 3 | 0 | 3 |
| Weightlifting | 3 | 4 | 7 |
| Wrestling | 1 | 0 | 1 |
| Total | 11 | 5 | 16 |

== Medallists ==
| Medal | Name | Sport | Event | Date |
|---|---|---|---|---|
| 3rd place, bronze medalist(s) | Maximina Uepa | Weightlifting | Women's 76 kg | 2 August 2022 |

== Athletics ==
Men
Track and road events

| Athlete | Event | Heat | | Semifinal | | Final | |
| Athlete | Event | Result | Rank | Result | Rank | Result | Rank |
|---|---|---|---|---|---|---|---|
| Jireh Agege | 100 m | 11.08 | 6 | did not advance | | | |
| Jireh Agege | 200 m | DNS | | did not start | | | |

Field events

| Athlete | Event | Final | |
| Athlete | Event | Distance | Rank |
|---|---|---|---|
| Jonathan-Deiwea Detageouwa | Shot put | 15.41 | 12 |

Women
Track and road events

| Athlete | Event | Heat | | Semifinal | | Final | |
| Athlete | Event | Result | Rank | Result | Rank | Result | Rank |
|---|---|---|---|---|---|---|---|
| Wena Gobure | 100 m | 13.21 | 7 | did not advance | | | |

== Boxing ==
Men

| Athlete | Event | Preliminaries 1 | Preliminaries 2 | Quarterfinals | Semifinals | Final | |
| Athlete | Event | Opposition Result | Opposition Result | Opposition Result | Opposition Result | Opposition Result | Rank |
|---|---|---|---|---|---|---|---|
| Christon Amram | Featherweight | Senior (AUS); L 0 - 5 | did not advance | | | | |
| Colan Caleb | Light welterweight | Jonas (NAM); L RSC | did not advance | | | | |

== Judo ==
Men

| Athlete | Event | Round of 32 | Round of 16 | Quarterfinals | Semifinals | Repechage | Final/BM | |
| Athlete | Event | Opposition Result | Opposition Result | Opposition Result | Opposition Result | Opposition Result | Opposition Result | Rank |
|---|---|---|---|---|---|---|---|---|
| Isamaela Solomon | -60 kg | Bye | Hall (ENG); L 00 - 10 | did not advance | | | | 9 |
| Kip Kosam | -81 kg | —N/a | Ceesay (GAM); W 10 - 00 | Fleming (NIR); L 00 - 10 | —N/a | Weithers (BAR); L 00 - 10 | Did not advance | 7 |
| Kendrick Taleka | -81 kg | —N/a | Elnahas (CAN); L 00 - 10 | did not advance | | | | 9 |

== Weightlifting ==
Nauru qualified 4 weightlifters (two per gender). The four qualified through their respective Commonwealth Weightlifting ranking as of 28 February 2022.

Men

| Athlete | Event | Weight Lifted | | Total | Rank |
| Athlete | Event | Snatch | Clean & jerk | Total | Rank |
|---|---|---|---|---|---|
| Shadrach Cain | Men's -61 kg | 90 | 116 | 206 | 7 |
| Ditto Ika | Men's -67 kg | 105 | 140 | 245 | 7 |
| Ezekiel Moses | Men's -73 kg | 130 | 155 | 285 | 8 |

Women

| Athlete | Event | Weight lifted | | Total | Rank |
| Athlete | Event | Snatch | Clean & jerk | Total | Rank |
|---|---|---|---|---|---|
| My-Only Stephen | Women's -55 kg | 68 | 86 | 154 | 8 |
| Bernice Detudamo | Women's -64 kg | 60 | 81 | 141 | 12 |
| Nancy Abouke | Women's -71 kg | 87 | 110 | 197 | 5 |
| Maximina Uepa | Women's -76 kg | 96 | 119 | 215 | 3rd place, bronze medalist(s) |

== Wrestling ==
Key:

- VFA - Victory by Fall.
- PP - Decision by Points - the loser with technical points.
- PO - Decision by Points - the loser without technical points.

| Athlete | Event | Round of 16 | Quarterfinal | Semifinal | Repechage | Final / BM | |
| Athlete | Event | Opposition Result | Opposition Result | Opposition Result | Opposition Result | Opposition Result | Rank |
|---|---|---|---|---|---|---|---|
| Lowe Bingham | Men's -65 kg | Punia (IND); L 0 - 4 (VFA) | —N/a | | Bandou (MRI); W 6 (VFA) - 4 | Ramm (ENG); L 0 - 11 (VSU) | 5 |
