= Kimmit Lowell Harvey =

Turks and Calicos Islands male weightlifter

Personal information
- Full name: Kimmit Lowell Harvey
- Born: 2 September 1973 (age 52)
- Weight: 113.88 kg (251.1 lb)

Sport
- Country: Turks and Caicos Islands
- Sport: Weightlifting
- Weight class: +105 kg
- Team: National team
- Updated on 18 October 2016

Kimmit Lowell Harvey (born 2 September 1973) is a Turks and Caicos Islands male weightlifter, competing in the +105 kg category and representing Turks and Caicos Islands at international competitions. He participated at the 2010 Commonwealth Games in the +105 kg event.

== Major competitions ==
Year	Venue	Weight	Snatch (kg)				Clean & Jerk (kg)				Total	Rank
Year	Venue	Weight	1	2	3	Rank	1	2	3	Rank	Total	Rank
Commonwealth Games
2010	(Indonesia) Delhi, India	+105 kg	~~90~~	90	~~100~~	—N/a	100	110	120	—N/a	210	8
