= Parminder Phangura =

Canadian weightlifter

Personal information
- Full name: Parminder Phangura
- Born: 11 October 1979 (age 46)
- Weight: 137.04 kg (302.1 lb)

Sport
- Country: Canada
- Sport: Weightlifting
- Team: National team
- Updated on 6 September 2016

Parminder Phangura (born 11 October 1979) is a Canadian male weightlifter, competing in the +105 kg category and representing Canada at international competitions. He competed at world championships, such as the 2011 World Weightlifting Championships. He participated at the 2010 Commonwealth Games in the +105 kg event.

== Major results ==
| Year | Venue | Weight | Snatch (kg) | | | | Clean & Jerk (kg) | | | | Total | Rank |
| Year | Venue | Weight | 1 | 2 | 3 | Rank | 1 | 2 | 3 | Rank | Total | Rank |
World Championships
| 2011 | Paris, France | +105 kg | 151 | ~~155~~ | 155 | 36 | ~~190~~ | ~~190~~ | 190 | 35 | 345 | 34 |
Commonwealth Games
| 2010 | (Indonesia) Delhi, India | +105 kg | ~~155~~ | ~~155~~ | ~~156~~ | —N/a | --- | --- | --- | —N/a | 0 | --- |
| 2014 | Glasgow, Scotland | +105 kg | 145 | 150 | ~~156~~ | —N/a | 185 | 191 | ~~201~~ | —N/a | 341 | 6 |
