= Miles Wydall =

Australian National Weightlifting coach

Miles Wydall is an Australian National Weightlifting coach who coaches at Cougars Weightlifting Club in Brisbane.

He has developed over 40 Australian representatives in Weightlifting including dual Olympian and 2010 Commonwealth Games gold medalist Damon Kelly, 2006 Commonwealth Games gold medalist Ben Turner and Olympian and 2018 Commonwealth Games Gold Medalist Tia-Clair Toomey, six-time winner of the CrossFit Games.

Miles was Section Manager and Head Coach of the Australian Weightlifting Team at the 2012 Summer Olympics and 2016 Summer Olympics and 2024 Summer Olympics and a coach at the 2010 Commonwealth Games, 2014 Commonwealth Games and 2018 Commonwealth Games and 2022 Commonwealth Games.
