= Nauru at the 2002 Commonwealth Games =

- CG code: NRU
- CGA: Nauru Olympic Committee
- Website: oceaniasport.com/nauru

in Manchester, England
- Medals Ranked 16th: Gold 2 Silver 5 Bronze 8 Total 15

Commonwealth Games appearances (overview)
- 1990; 1994; 1998; 2002; 2006; 2010; 2014; 2018; 2022; 2026; 2030

Nauru was represented at the 2002 Commonwealth Games in Manchester by a team consisting solely of weight-lifters. Marcus Stephen, who became President of Nauru five years later, competed for the fourth and last time. The 2002 Games were the first edition of the Commonwealth Games in which he failed to win a gold medal; Nauru's two golds were won by Reanna Solomon.

The 2002 Games marked Nauru's fourth participation in the Commonwealth Games, and the small country achieved by far its best result to date, with fifteen medals. It was also the first time that women had represented Nauru at the Games. Female athletes won ten of Nauru's fifteen medals, including its two gold.

== Medals ==
	Gold	Silver	Bronze	Total
Nauru	2	5	8	15

== Medalists ==
=== Gold ===
- Reanna Solomon, Weightlifting, Women's 75 kg+ Clean and Jerk
- Reanna Solomon, Weightlifting, Women's 75 kg+ Combined

=== Silver ===
- Marcus Stephen, Weightlifting, Men's 62 kg Clean and Jerk
- Marcus Stephen, Weightlifting, Men's 62 kg Combined
- Marcus Stephen, Weightlifting, Men's 62 kg Snatch
- Jalon Renos Doweiya, Weightlifting, Men's 77 kg Clean and Jerk
- Jalon Renos Doweiya, Weightlifting, Men's 77 kg Combined

=== Bronze ===
- Ebonette Deigaeruk, Weightlifting, Women's 48 kg Clean and Jerk
- Ebonette Deigaeruk, Weightlifting, Women's 48 kg Combined
- Ebonette Deigaeruk, Weightlifting, Women's 48 kg Snatch
- Sheba Deireragea, Weightlifting, Women's 69 kg Clean and Jerk
- Sheba Deireragea, Weightlifting, Women's 69 kg Combined
- Sheba Deireragea, Weightlifting, Women's 69 kg Snatch
- Mary Diranga, Weightlifting, Women's 75 kg Clean and Jerk
- Reanna Solomon, Weightlifting, Women's 75 kg+ Snatch

== Sources ==
- Official results
