= Weightlifting at the 2006 Commonwealth Games – Men's +105 kg =

Weightlifting – Men's +105 kg at the 2006 Commonwealth Games
- Venue: Melbourne Exhibition Centre
- Dates: 23 March 2006
- Competitors: 9 from 7 nations
- Winning total weight: 388

Medalists
| gold medal | Chris Rae | Australia |
| silver medal | Damon Kelly | Australia |
| bronze medal | Itte Detenamo | Nauru |

The men's +105 kg weightlifting event at the 2006 Commonwealth Games took place at the Melbourne Exhibition Centre on 23 March 2006. The weightlifter from Australia won the gold, lifting a total weight of 388 kg.

== Schedule ==
All times are Australian Eastern Standard Time (UTC+10)

| Date | Time | Event |
|---|---|---|
| 23 March 2006 | 18:30 | Group A |

== Records ==
Prior to this competition, the existing world, Commonwealth and Games records were as follows:

| World record | Snatch | Hossein Rezazadeh (IRI) | 213 kg | Qinhuangdao, China | 14 September 2003 |
| World record | Clean & Jerk | Hossein Rezazadeh (IRI) | 263.5 kg | Athens, Greece | 25 August 2004 |
| World record | Total | Hossein Rezazadeh (IRI) | 472.5 kg | Sydney, Australia | 26 September 2000 |
| Commonwealth record | Snatch | | | | |
| Commonwealth record | Clean & Jerk | Chris Rae (AUS) | 227 kg | Adelaide, Australia | 16 April 2004 |
| Commonwealth record | Total | Chris Rae (AUS) | 405 kg | Adelaide, Australia | 16 April 2004 |
| Games record | Snatch | Giles Greenwood (ENG) | 180 kg | Manchester, Great Britain | 3 August 2002 |
| Games record | Clean & Jerk | Nigel Avery (NZL) | 215 kg | Manchester, Great Britain | 3 August 2002 |
| Games record | Total | Nigel Avery (NZL) | 390 kg | Manchester, Great Britain | 3 August 2002 |

The following records were established during the competition:

| Clean & Jerk | 216 kg | Chris Rae (AUS) | GR |
| Clean & Jerk | 217 kg | Damon Kelly (AUS) | GR |

== Results ==
| Rank | Athlete | Nation | Group | Body weight | Snatch (kg) | | | | Clean & Jerk (kg) | | | | Total |
| Rank | Athlete | Nation | Group | Body weight | 1 | 2 | 3 | Result | 1 | 2 | 3 | Result | Total |
|---|---|---|---|---|---|---|---|---|---|---|---|---|---|
| 1st place, gold medalist(s) | Chris Rae | Australia | A | 144.09 | 160 | 167 | 172 | 172 | 205 | 216 | ~~230~~ | 216 | 388 |
| 2nd place, silver medalist(s) | Damon Kelly | Australia | A | 147.90 | 157 | 163 | 168 | 168 | 195 | 205 | 217 | 217 | 385 |
| 3rd place, bronze medalist(s) | Itte Detenamo | Nauru | A | 149.58 | 150 | 160 | ~~167~~ | 160 | 190 | 200 | ~~208~~ | 200 | 360 |
| 4 | Maamaloa Lolohea | Tonga | A | 136.91 | 135 | ~~140~~ | ~~140~~ | 135 | 175 | 177 | ~~190~~ | 177 | 312 |
| 5 | Terrance Perdue | Wales | A | 138.03 | 120 | 130 | 135 | 135 | 150 | 170 | 176 | 176 | 311 |
| 6 | Marea Taomati | Kiribati | A | 108.86 | 130 | ~~135~~ | ~~140~~ | 130 | ~~165~~ | ~~166~~ | 166 | 166 | 296 |
| 7 | Bernard Fetrie | Ghana | A | 151.41 | 112 | 117 | 122 | 122 | 142 | 148 | ~~152~~ | 148 | 270 |
| 8 | Leon Tomailuga | Niue | A | 136.43 | 90 | 96 | 106 | 106 | 110 | 120 | 130 | 130 | 236 |
| 9 | Jody Laufoli | Niue | A | 108.54 | 85 | 93 | ~~101~~ | 93 | 107 | ~~114~~ | ~~118~~ | 107 | 200 |
