= Nauru at the 2006 Commonwealth Games =

- CG code: NRU
- CGA: Nauru Olympic Committee
- Website: oceaniasport.com/nauru

in Melbourne, Australia
- Medals Ranked 27th: Gold 0 Silver 1 Bronze 1 Total 2

Commonwealth Games appearances (overview)
- 1990; 1994; 1998; 2002; 2006; 2010; 2014; 2018; 2022; 2026; 2030

Nauru was represented at the 2006 Commonwealth Games in Melbourne by a team consisting purely of weight-lifters.

== Medals ==
	(gold)	(silver)	(bronze)	Total
Nauru	0	1	1	2

== Medalists ==
Medal	Name	Sport	Event
Silver	Sheba Deireragea	Weightlifting	Women's 75 kg
Bronze	Itte Detenamo	Weightlifting	Men's +105 kg
