= Lauititi Lui =

Samoan weightlifter (born 1995)

Personal information
- Full name: Lauititi Lui
- Born: 4 December 1995 (age 30)
- Weight: 130.65 kg (288.0 lb)

Sport
- Country: Samoa
- Sport: Weightlifting
- Weight class: +105 kg
- Team: National team
Medal record
Men's weightlifting
Representing Samoa
Commonwealth Games
Silver medal – second place	2018 Gold Coast	+105 kg
Pacific Games
Silver medal – second place	2015 Port Moresby	+105 kg
Commonwealth Championships
Gold medal – first place	2017 Gold Coast	+105 kg
Oceania Championships
Gold medal – first place	2017 Gold Coast	+105 kg
Silver medal – second place	2015 Port Moresby	+105 kg
Bronze medal – third place	2016 Suva	+105 kg

Lauititi Lui (born 4 December 1995) is a Samoan male weightlifter, competing in the +105 kg category and representing Samoa at international competitions. He participated at the 2014 Commonwealth Games in the +105 kg event. He won the silver medal at the 2015 Pacific Games, lifting a total of 362 kg and the bronze medal at the 2016 Oceania Weightlifting Championships, lifting a total of 368 kg. He won the bronze medal at the 2013 Pacific Mini Games.

== Major competitions ==
Year	Venue	Weight	Snatch (kg)				Clean & Jerk (kg)				Total	Rank
Year	Venue	Weight	1	2	3	Rank	1	2	3	Rank	Total	Rank
Commonwealth Games
2014	Glasgow, Scotland	+105 kg	~~135~~	135	140	—N/a	175	181	~~185~~	—N/a	321	8
2018	Gold Coast, Australia	+105 kg	175	~~179~~	~~179~~	1	215	225	~~228~~	2	400	2nd place, silver medalist(s)
Pacific Mini Games
2013	Mata Utu, Wallis and Futuna	+105 kg	?	?	?	---	?	?	?	---	298	3rd place, bronze medalist(s)

== See also ==
- Weightlifting at the 2018 Commonwealth Games – Men's +105 kg
