= Niue at the 2010 Commonwealth Games =

Niue at the Commonwealth Games
- CGF code: NIU
- CGA: Niue Island Sports Association National Olympic Committee
- Website: oceaniasport.com/niue
- Medals Ranked 0th: Gold 0 Silver 0 Bronze 0 Total 0

Commonwealth Games appearances (overview)
- 2002; 2006; 2010; 2014; 2018; 2022; 2026; 2030

Niue competed in the 2010 Commonwealth Games held in Delhi, India, from 3 to 14 October 2010.

== Athletics ==
=== Men ===
Track

Event	Athlete(s)	Heats		Round 2		Semi Finals		Final	
Event	Athlete(s)	Result	Rank	Result	Rank	Result	Rank	Result	Rank
100m	Xavier Denzel Luani Niuia-Tofa	11.22	DNQ	Did Not Advance					
100m	Billie Wallbridge-Paea	10.95	DNQ	Did Not Advance					
100m	Suitulaga Tupuiliu	11.04	DNQ	Did Not Advance					
200m	Dylan Harley Ogotau	24.81	DNQ	Did Not Advance					
200m	Xavier Denzel Luani Niuia-Tofa	DNS		Did Not Advance					
200m	Ponifasio Tahamaka Kapaga	24,40	DNQ	Did Not Advance					
4x100m Relay	Billie Wallbridge-Paea; Ponifasio Tahamaka Kapaga; Suitulaga Tupuiliu; Xavier Denzel Luani Niuia-Tofa	44.85	DNQ					Did Not Advance	

== Boxing ==
Event	Boxer	Round of 32	Round of 16	Quarter Finals	Semi Finals	Final	Rank
Event	Boxer	Opposition Result	Opposition Result	Opposition Result	Opposition Result	Opposition Result	Rank
Light heavyweight 81 kg	Travis Tapatuetoa	BYE	(New Zealand) Papuni (NZL); L 1-5	Did Not Advance			9

== Lawn bowls ==
=== Singles ===
Event	Player	Match 1	Match 2	Match 3	Match 4	Match 5	Match 6	Match 7	Match 8	Match 9	Quarter Final	Semi Final	Final	Rank
Men	Leslie Lagatule	(Wales) Weale (WAL); L 0-2	(Brunei) Kasim (BRU); W 2-0	(New Zealand) Forsyth (NZL); L 0-2	(England) Tolchard (ENG); L 0-2	(Cook Islands) Pita (COK); L 0-2	(Jersey) Rive (JEY); L 0-2	(Malta) Parnis (MLT); L 1-1*	(Botswana) Mascarenhas (BOT); W 1*-1	-	Did Not Advance			
Singles	Hina Rereiti	(Samoa) Maessen (SAM); L 0-2	(Zambia) Hilda (ZAM); W 2-0	(Australia) Cottrell (AUS); L 1-1*	(Wales) Difford (WAL); L 1-1*	(Malawi) Humphreys (MAW); L 0-2	(Cook Islands) Tupuna (COK); W 1*-1	(England) Melmore (ENG); L 0-2	(Kenya) Kariuki (KEN); W 1,5-0,5	(Papua New Guinea) Sloten (PNG); W 2-0	Did Not Advance			

=== Pairs ===
Event	Players	Match 1	Match 2	Match 3	Match 4	Match 5	Match 6	Match 7	Match 8	Match 9	Match 10	Match 11	Quarter Final	Semi Final	Final	Rank
Men	John Ridd Kumitau; Motufoli Vakaheketaha	(Australia) Australia; L 0-2	(Scotland) Scotland; L 0-2	(Brunei) Brunei; L 0.5-1.5	(Eswatini) Swaziland; L 0.5-1.5	(Northern Ireland) Northern Ireland; L 0-2	(Canada) Canada; L 0.5-1.5	(Botswana) Botswana; L 1-1*	(Papua New Guinea) Papua New Guinea; L 1-1*	(Kenya) Kenya; L 1-1*	(Cook Islands) Cook Islands; L 0-2	(South Africa) South Africa; L 0.5-1.5	Did Not Advance			
Women	Olivia Bloomfield; Josphine Peyroux	(Guernsey) Guernsey; L 0-2	(Brunei) Brunei; L 1-1*	(Eswatini) Swaziland; L 0.5-1.5	(Samoa) Samoa; W 1*-1	(Malaysia) Malaysia; L 0-2	(Papua New Guinea) Papua New Guinea; W 1*-1	(Scotland) Scotland; L 0-2	(England) England; L 0-2	(Jersey) Jersey; L 0.5-1.5	(Wales) Wales; L 0-2	-	Did Not Advance			

=== Triples ===
Event	Players	Match 1	Match 2	Match 3	Match 4	Match 5	Match 6	Match 7	Match 8	Match 9	Match 10	Quarter Final	Semi Final	Final	Rank
Men	Vihekula Kanaihu; Ian McKenna; Kolonisi Polima	(South Africa) South Africa; L 0-2	(Brunei) Brunei; L 1-1*	(Scotland) Scotland; L 0-2	(Canada) Canada; L 0-2	(New Zealand) New Zealand; W 1*-1	(Australia) Australia; L 0-2	(India) India; L 0-2	(Wales) Wales; L 0-2	(Namibia) Namibia; L 1-1*	(Malta) Malta; L 0-2	Did Not Advance			
Women	Faua Bell; Koumanogi Lepa; Anne Strickland	(Jersey) Jersey; L 0-2	(Northern Ireland) Northern Ireland; L 1-1*	(Namibia) Namibia; L 0-2	(New Zealand) New Zealand; L 0-2	(Australia) Australia; W 1*-1	(India) India; L 0-2	(Botswana) Botswana; L 0-2	(Scotland) Scotland; L 0-2	-	-	Did Not Advance			

== Shooting ==
=== Clay Target ===
Men

Event	Shooter(s)	Qualifying		Final	
Event	Shooter(s)	Points	Rank	Points	Rank
Trap Singles	San Juan Talagi	71	37	Did Not Advance	
Trap Singles	Clayton Viliamu	91	36	Did Not Advance	
Trap Pairs	Clayton Viliamu & San Talagi			123	16
Double Trap Singles	Isatose Talagi	98	19	Did Not Advance	
Double Trap Singles	Tuaitama Talaititama	85	20	Did Not Advance	
Double Trap Pairs	Isatose Talagi & Tuaitama Talaititama			111	9
Skeet Singles	Asaf Mahakitau	DNF		Did Not Advance	
Skeet Singles	Sione Belle Togiavalu	DNF		Did Not Advance	
Skeet Pairs	Asaf Mahakitau & Sione Belle Togiavalu			66	12

== Weightlifting ==
Men

Athlete	Event	Snatch		Clean & Jerk		Total	Rank
Athlete	Event	Result	Rank	Result	Rank	Total	Rank
Daniel Nemani	+105 kg	141	7	171	6	312	6

Women

Athlete	Event	Snatch		Clean & Jerk		Total	Rank
Athlete	Event	Result	Rank	Result	Rank	Total	Rank
Narita Viliamu	+75 kg	90	6	125	6	215	6

== Wrestling ==
=== Freestyle ===
Event	Weight Class	Wrestler	Quarter Final	Semi Final	Repechage 1	Repechage 2	Final	Rank
Event	Weight Class	Wrestler	Opposition Result	Opposition Result	Opposition Result	Opposition Result	Opposition Result	Rank
Women	67 kg	Justine Kalauni	(Australia) Chalmers (AUS); L 0-4	Did Not Advance				
