= Matthias Steiner =

Austrian-German weightlifter (born 1982)

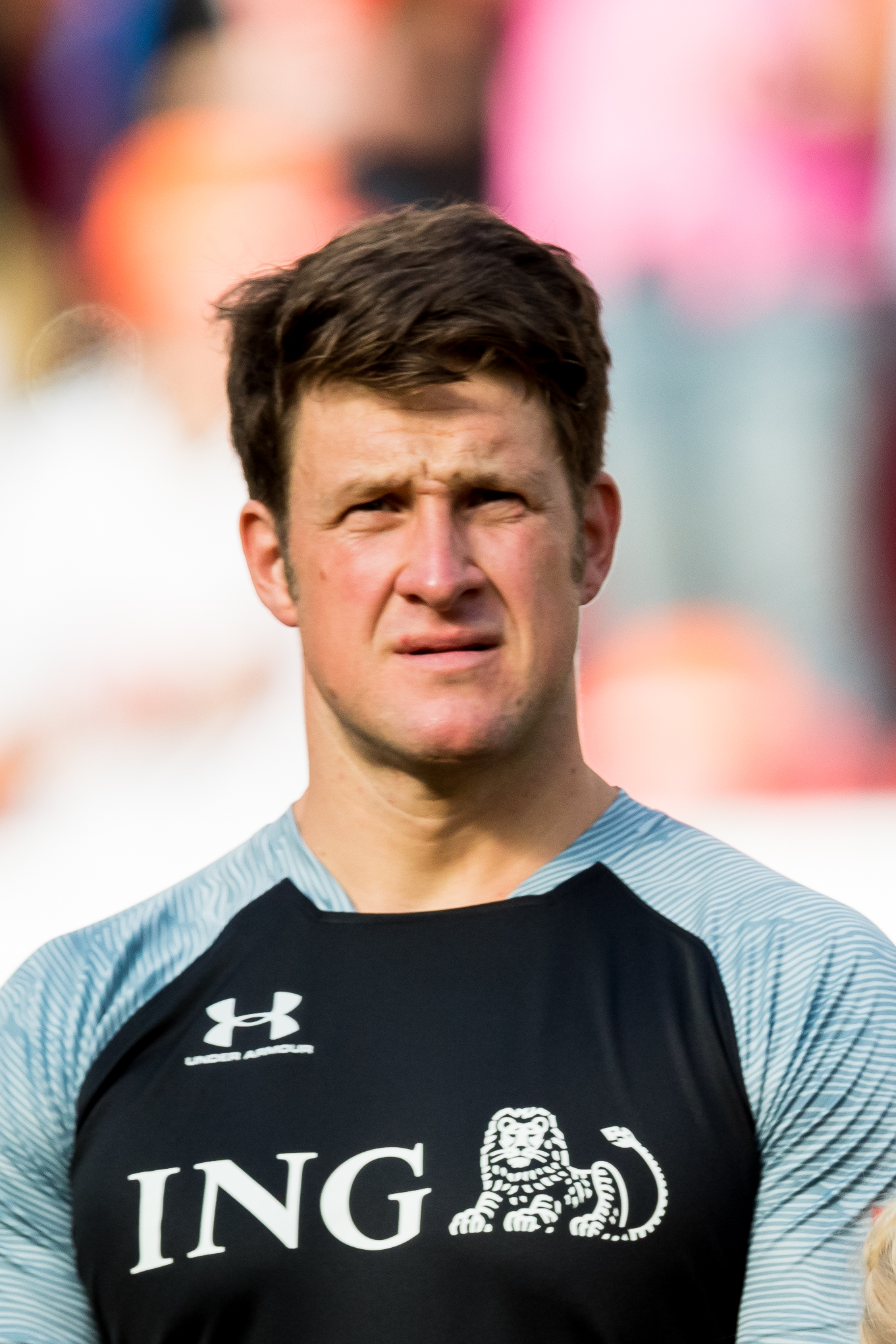
- Steiner in 2019

Personal information
- Nationality: Austrian / German
- Born: 25 August 1982 (age 44) Vienna, Austria
- Height: 1.83 m (6 ft 0 in) (2012)
- Weight: 145 kg (320 lb) (2012)
- Website: www.matthiassteiner.com

Sport
- Country: Austria (2001–2005); Germany (2008–2013)
- Sport: Weightlifting
- Event: +105 kg
- Club: Chemnitzer AC
- Turned pro: 2001
- Coached by: Frank Mantek, Michael Vater
- Retired: 2013

Achievements and titles
- Personal bests: Snatch: 203 kg (2008); Clean and jerk: 258 kg (2008); Total: 461 kg (2008)
Medal record
Men's weightlifting
Representing Germany
Olympic Games
Gold medal – first place	2008 Beijing	+105 kg
World Championships
Silver medal – second place	2010 Antalya	+105 kg
European Championships
Silver medal – second place	2008 Lignano Sabbiadoro	+105 kg
Silver medal – second place	2012 Antalya	+105 kg
Bronze medal – third place	2010 Minsk	+105 kg

Matthias Steiner (German pronunciation: [maˈtiːas ˈʃtaɪnɐ]; born 25 August 1982) is an Austrian-German retired weightlifter who is an Olympic gold medalist.

As a native Austrian, he competed for Austria internationally from 1998 to 2005, in European Championships, World Championships, and the 2004 Summer Olympics. From 2002 to 2005 he was four times Austrian National Champion in the +105 kg category, and holds Austrian records in the −105 kg and +105 kg categories. In 2005, Steiner left the Austrian weightlifting federation, and married a German woman.

Although his wife died in a car accident, he continued his weightlifting career in Germany, eventually received German citizenship in early 2008, won overall silver at the 2008 European Championships, and the gold medal at the 2008 Summer Olympics.

== Early and personal life ==
Matthias Steiner was born in Vienna, Austria. He hails from Obersulz in Lower Austria, where he attended Volksschule (primary school), then Hauptschule (secondary school). Steiner completed an apprenticeship in plumbing.

He started weightlifting in 1995. His father, Friedrich Steiner, a 20-time IWF-Masters World Weightlifting Champion, also ranks first on the IWF 2008 Hall of Fame Survey of Leading Master Lifters.

Steiner suffers from Type-1 diabetes, diagnosed at his 18th birthday. Before the diagnosis, the first symptom was an intense thirst, then he lost his appetite, and 5 kilograms (11 lb) of bodyweight within three months. He went to the doctor when his sight deteriorated.

In 2004, a German woman from Zwickau in Saxony had watched Steiner participating in weightlifting contests on TV. She kept asking the Eurosport commentators for his email address, until they gave it to her. She contacted Steiner, and he agreed to meet her in Lower Austria. They married shortly thereafter and hence he moved to Germany, where he then applied for German citizenship.

On 16 July 2007, his wife, Susann, died in a car accident. Despite the tragic loss, and after losing 7–8 kilograms (15–18 lb) of bodyweight, he was able to continue his training.

In October 2008, Steiner met German TV-newsreader Inge Posmyk. They married in February 2011.

== Weightlifting career ==
=== 1998–2003 ===
Steiner participated in the 1998 and 1999 European Junior Championships, and the 2000 Junior World Championships.

At the 2000 European Junior Championships in Rijeka, Croatia he came in 8th place in the 94 kg category, with a total of 320 kg (142.5 kg snatch and 177.5 kg clean and jerk).

At the 2001 European Junior Championships in Kalmar, Sweden he won bronze in the −105 kg category, with 360 kg (165 kg and 195 kg). At that time he competed for the AC Woge Bregenz weightlifting club. At the 2002 European Junior Championships in Havířov, Czech Republic he won bronze again in the −105 kg category, with 380 kg (172.5 kg and 207.5 kg).

Steiner won the Austrian National Championships in the +105 kg category in 2002 with a total of 370 kg, and in 2003 with a total of 390 kg.

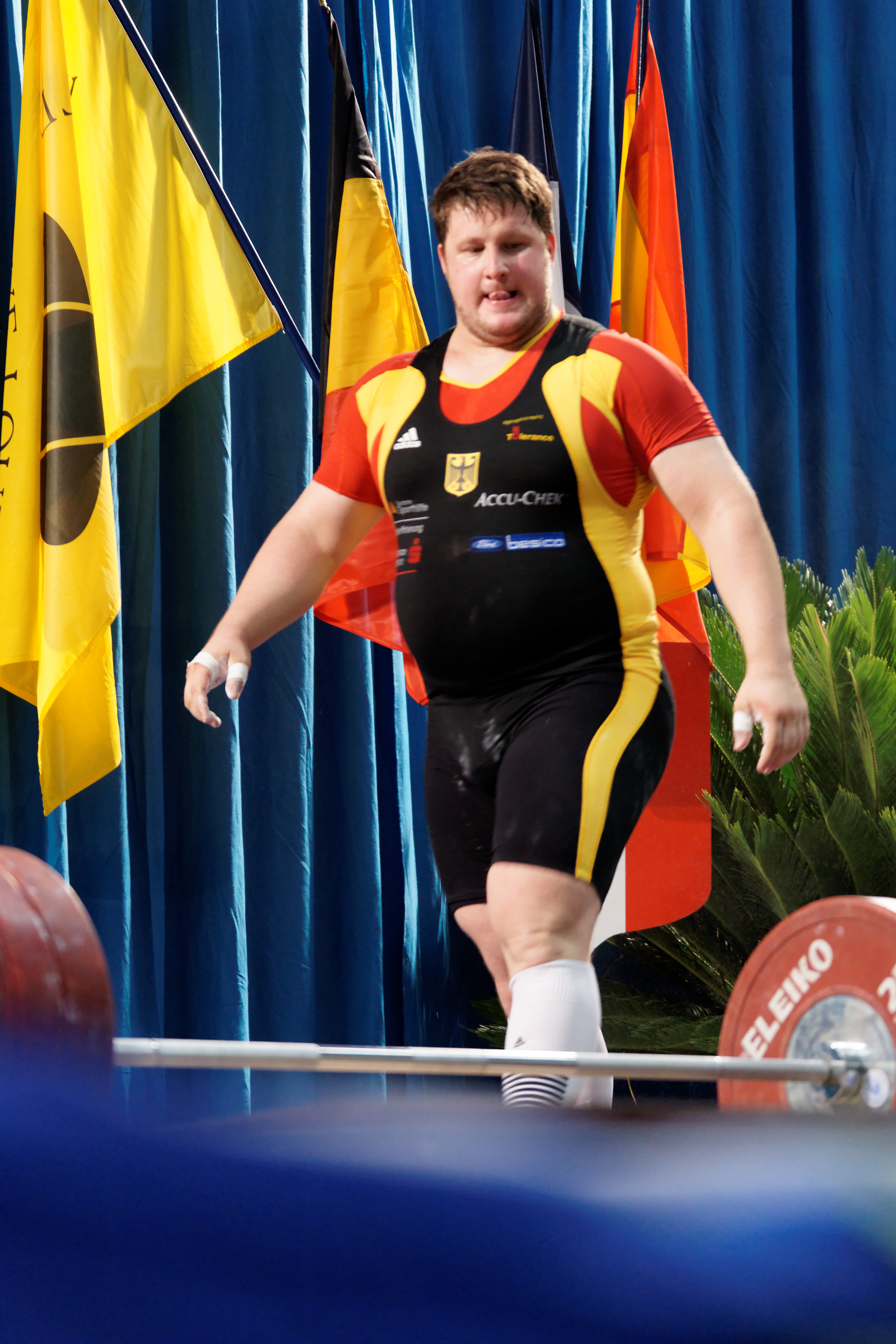
Matthias Steiner in 2010

=== 2004 ===
He won the 2004 Austrian National Championships in the +105 kg category with a total of 400 kg.

Steiner continued to increase his performance; at the 2004 Olympic Games in Athens he competed for Austria, and lifted 405 kg (182.5 kg and 222.5 kg) and went into 7th place in the -105 kg category.

=== 2005 ===
Im Gewichtheben hat der Trainer so ziemlich den größten Einfluss auf den Ausgang eines Wettkampfs. Darum ist das auch eine so enorm wichtige Person für jeden Athleten.
In weightlifting, the coach has about the greatest influence on the outcome of a competition. For this reason the coach is such an enormously important person for every athlete.

— Matthias Steiner, Steiner: "In Deutschland arbeiten Profis"

Steiner won the 2005 Austrian National Championships in the +105 kg category with a total of 382.5 kg.

Until 2005 he competed regularly in World Championships and European Championships for Austria. In 2005, the Austrian national coach was replaced against Steiners will, which caused tension between Steiner and the Austrian weightlifting federation. He kept the coach as personal coach, who however did not get accredited for the 2005 European Championships in Sofia.

Steiner also could no longer keep his body weight below 105 kilograms (231 lb), and bulked up for the +105 kg category. The 2005 European Championships were his first event in the new weight category.

At the European Championships, a lot went wrong and Steiner failed three snatch attempts. He had to compete in the B-group, because the European Weightlifting Federation did not accept the announced starting weights. After warming up he disagreed with the national coach concerning the starting weight, and time ran out on the first attempt. The Austrian national coach, together with other functionaries, accused Steiner of deliberate failure, which Steiner denied. As a consequence, he left the Austrian weightlifting federation.

=== 2006–2007 ===
During the three years that Steiner applied for German citizenship, he was not allowed to compete in international competitions. At the 2007 European Championships he was co-commentator with Marc Huster for Eurosport. Since moving to Germany he competes for the Chemnitzer AC weightlifting club, and is their team captain in the German weightlifting league. Steiner trains in the German Federal Weightlifting Center in Leimen near Heidelberg, with German national coach Frank Mantek.

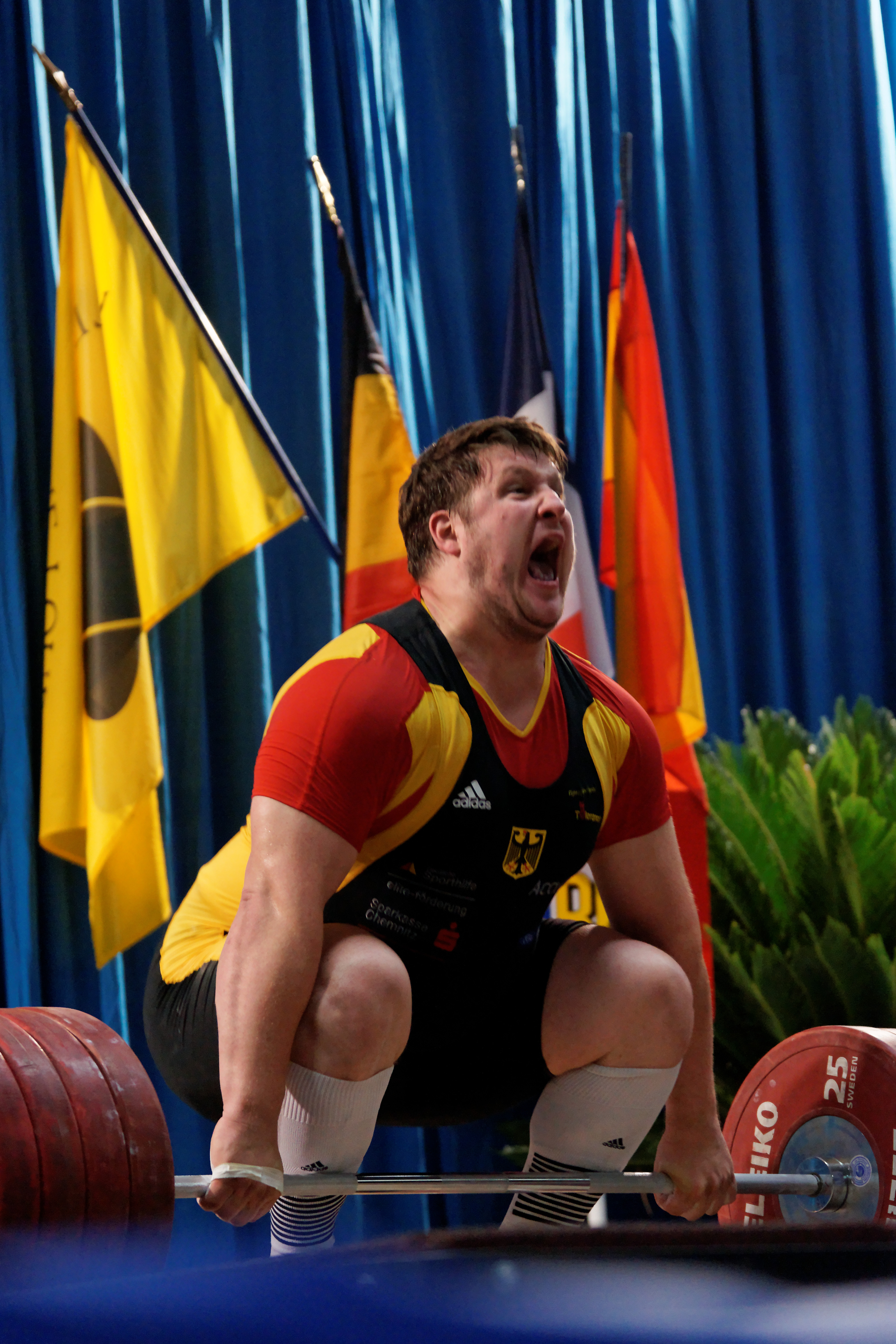
Matthias Steiner in 2010

=== 2008 ===
Steiner received German citizenship in early 2008, and started to compete internationally again, for Germany. On 23 January he won the Beijing Pre-Olympic Tournament with a total of 423 kg.

At the 2008 European Championships in Lignano Sabbiadoro, Italy in the over 105 kg category he was the only lifter to snatch 200 kg, winning gold. In clean and jerk he won bronze with a personal best of 246 kg. All his six attempts were successful. With a total result of 446 kg he won overall silver behind Viktors Ščerbatihs from Latvia, who lifted 447 kg.

The biggest success of Steiner's career came in August 2008, when he won the gold medal at the 2008 Summer Olympics. After World record holder Hossein Rezazadeh had retired in July 2008, the event turned into a close competition between Steiner, Evgeny Chigishev, and the tournament favorite, European and World champion Viktors Ščerbatihs.

During the Olympic competition, Steiner failed in his third snatch attempt, and with 203 kg ranked fourth after the snatch. Ščerbatihs was in position to take the lead in the clean and jerk, but failed in his second attempt. Steiner also failed in his first clean and jerk attempt, and Chigishev took the lead with 250 kg in the clean and jerk. Ščerbatihs failed in his third attempt, which would have forced Steiner to increase his last attempt to 261 kg in order to win gold. With a successful clean and jerk of 258 kg, and a total of 461 kg, Steiner became an Olympic gold medalist.

Steiner stood on the medalists' podium with a photo of his late wife, who would otherwise have accompanied him to the Games.

=== 2009–2015 ===
In January 2009, Steiner was operated on for an inguinal hernia. He had to pull out of competing at the 2009 Arnold Sports Festival in March, nevertheless was part of the German delegation at the event and met with Arnold Schwarzenegger.

At the 2009 German Championships he ranked second in the snatch behind Almir Velagic, and won overall with a total of 430 kg.

At the 2010 European Championships he ranked third with a total of 426 kg.

In the 2012 London Olympics weightlifting competition Steiner was injured during the snatch portion of the competition when he attempted to pull 196 kg but was hit in the neck by the barbell. While not seriously hurt, Steiner had to abandon the competition as a result of his injury. He announced his retirement from competitive weightlifting in March 2013.

Steiner participated in Season 8 of the German TV dance show Let's Dance, finishing third.

== Career statistics ==
Date	Tournament	Venue	Weight category	Snatch	Rank	Clean and jerk	Rank	Overall	Rank
2001-04-28	European Championships	Trenčín, Slovakia	−94 kg	150.0 kg	15th	175.0 kg	15th	325.0 kg	16th
2002-04-25	European Championships	Antalya, Turkey	+105 kg	172.5 kg	12th	207.5 kg	11th	380 kg	11th
2002-11-23	World Championships	Warsaw, Poland	−105 kg	180.0 kg	12th	215.0 kg	12th	395.0 kg	12th
2003-04-18	European Championships	Loutraki, Greece	−105 kg	180.0 kg	8th	212.5 kg	9th	392.5 kg	8th
2003-11-17	World Championships	Vancouver, Canada	−105 kg	182.5 kg	9th	220.0 kg	6th	402.5 kg	7th
2004-04-24	European Championships	Kyiv, Ukraine	−105 kg	180.0 kg	10th	225.0 kg	5th	405.0 kg	7th
2004-08-15	Olympic Games	Athens, Greece	−105 kg	182.5 kg	–	222.5 kg	–	405.0 kg	7th
2005-04-22	European Championships	Sofia, Bulgaria	+105 kg	–	–	–	–	–	DNF
2008-04-14	European Championships	Lignano S., Italy	+105 kg	200.0 kg	1st	246.0 kg	3rd	446.0 kg	2nd
2008-08-19	Olympic Games	Beijing, China	+105 kg	203.0 kg	–	258.0 kg	–	461.0 kg	1st
2010-04-11	European Championships	Minsk, Belarus	+105 kg	190.0 kg	4th	236.0 kg	2nd	426.0 kg	3rd

=== National championships ===
Year	Country	Weight category	Snatch	Rank	Clean and jerk	Rank	Overall	Rank
2002	Austria	+105 kg	167.5 kg	1st	202.5 kg	1st	370.0 kg	1st
2003	Austria	+105 kg	175.0 kg	1st	215.0 kg	1st	390.0 kg	1st
2004	Austria	+105 kg	177.5 kg	1st	222.5 kg	1st	400.0 kg	1st
2005	Austria	+105 kg	172.5 kg	1st	210.0 kg	1st	382.5 kg	1st
2009	Germany	+105 kg	190.0 kg	2nd	240.0 kg	1st	430.0 kg	1st

=== Personal bests ===
- Snatch: 203 kg (448 lb)
- Clean and jerk: 258 kg (569 lb)
- Combined: 461 kg (1,020 lb)

Steiner holds Austrian records in the −105 kg and +105 kg categories.

== Sponsorships ==
In 2008, Steiner signed a four-year contract with marketing company "movie & more" in Cologne. Previously, he was supported by Stiftung Deutsche Sporthilfe and his weightlifting club Chemnitzer AC. The Bundeswehr, while supporting other German weightlifters, did not admit Steiner because of his diabetes.

== Media ==
On 20 August 2008, the day after he won the Olympic gold medal, Steiner featured on the cover of China Daily's Olympian, titled "Supersteiner".

=== TV appearances ===
Apart from sports events, where he participated in or commented on weightlifting competitions, Steiner also appeared on a number of talk shows and game shows in Germany and Austria, including Wetten, dass..? and Die Millionenshow (Austrian Who Wants to Be a Millionaire?, Celebrity Special Edition).

== Awards ==
- Goldenes Ehrenzeichen für Verdienste um die Republik Österreich (Austria)
- Silbernes Lorbeerblatt (Germany)
- 2008 German Weightlifter of the Year
- 2008 Bambi award, category Sports
- 2008 German Sportspersonality of the year – Steiner was the first weightlifter to receive this award.
- 2008 IWF World Weightlifting Lifter of the Year
- 2008 Gold Medal Summer Olympics

Awards
Preceded by (Germany) Fabian Hambüchen	German Sportsman of the Year; 2008	Succeeded by Paul Biedermann
