= Daniel Nemani =

Niuean weightlifter

Personal information
- Full name: Daniel Nemani
- Born: 10 April 1981 (age 45)
- Weight: 140.71 kg (310.2 lb)

Sport
- Country: Niue
- Sport: Weightlifting
- Team: National team
- Updated on 6 September 2016

Daniel Nemani (born 10 April 1981) is a Niuean male weightlifter, competing in the +105 kg category and representing Niue at international competitions. He participated at the 2010 Commonwealth Games and 2014 Commonwealth Games. He competed at world championships, most recently at the 2011 World Weightlifting Championships.

== Major results ==
Year	Venue	Weight	Snatch (kg)				Clean & Jerk (kg)				Total	Rank
Year	Venue	Weight	1	2	3	Rank	1	2	3	Rank	Total	Rank
World Championships
2011	Paris, France	+105 kg	135	140	~~144~~	41	165	~~172~~	175	39	315	39
Commonwealth Games
2014	(United Kingdom) Glasgow, Great Britain	+105 kg	135	~~140~~	145	8	170	176	~~181~~	10	321	9
2010	Delhi, India	+105 kg	133	138	141	7	171	~~176~~	~~176~~	6	312	6
