= Weightlifting at the 2026 Commonwealth Games – Women's 63 kg =

Weightlifting – Women's 63 kg at the 2026 Commonwealth Games
- Venue: Scottish Event Campus
- Dates: 28 July 2026
- Competitors: 11 from 11 nations
- Winning total: 232 kg GR

Medalists
gold medal	Maude Charron	Canada
silver medal	Sarah Davies	England
bronze medal	Femily-Crystie Notte	Nauru

The Women's 63 kg weightlifting event at the 2026 Commonwealth Games took place at the SEC Armadillo, Glasgow on 28 July 2026. Canada's Maude Charron won the gold medal ahead of Sarah Davies from England who took silver with Femily-Crystie Notte of Nauru claiming the bronze.

== Qualification ==
A total of 176 weightlifters (88 per gender) qualify to compete at the Games. Nations may earn one quota per weight class, allocated as follows:

- Automatic Qualification – Host CGA (1 per event)
- Direct Qualification – 2025 Commonwealth Weightlifting Champions (1 per event)
- IWF Commonwealth Ranking List (Ranking Period: 01 June 2025 – 18 May 2026) (8 per event)
- Bipartite Invitation (1 per event)

The following lifters qualified in the Women's 63 kg class:

Means of qualification	Quotas	Qualified
Host Nation	1	Beth Ashbee (SCO)
2025 Commonwealth Championships	1	Maude Charron (CAN)
IWF Commonwealth Rankings	~~8~~7	Femily-Crystie Notte (NRU); Sarah Davies (ENG); Nirupama Devi Seram (IND); Kiana Elliott (AUS); Ruth Imoleayo Ayodele (NGR); Roberta Tabone (MLT); Nur Syazwani Binti Radzi (MAS); ~~Sienna Fesolai (NZL)~~
Bipartite Invitation	1	Hannah Crymble (NIR)
Reallocation	1	Charlotte Whalley (WAL)
TOTAL	11	

== Schedule ==
All times are British Summer Time (UTC+1)

Date	Time	Round
28 July 2026	09:00	Final

== Competition ==
Rank	Athlete	Body weight (kg)	Snatch (kg)				Clean & Jerk (kg)				Total
Rank	Athlete	Body weight (kg)	1	2	3	Result	1	2	3	Result	Total
1st place, gold medalist(s)	Maude Charron (CAN)		99	102	~~105~~	102 GR	124	~~130~~	130	130 GR	232 GR
2nd place, silver medalist(s)	Sarah Davies (ENG)		~~95~~	~~95~~	95	95	~~122~~	122	~~138~~	122	217
3rd place, bronze medalist(s)	Femily-Crystie Notte (NRU)		97	~~100~~	100	100	113	116	~~117~~	116	216
4	Kiana Elliott (AUS)		~~95~~	95	99	99	112	115	~~118~~	115	214
5	Roberta Tabone (MLT)		86	89	~~91~~	89	111	~~115~~	115	115	204
6	Nur Syazwani Binti Radzi (MAS)		~~87~~	~~88~~	88	88	110	115	~~117~~	115	203
7	Ruth Imoleayo Ayodele (NGR)		85	88	~~91~~	88	105	~~110~~	~~110~~	105	193
8	Charlotte Whalley (WAL)		~~82~~	82	~~86~~	82	100	104	~~106~~	104	186
9	Beth Ashbee (SCO)		~~85~~	~~85~~	85	85	95	100	~~104~~	100	185
—	Hannah Crymble (NIR)		~~84~~	~~84~~	~~84~~	—	—	—	—	—	—
—	Nirupama Devi Seram (IND)		~~93~~	93	~~95~~	93	~~123~~	~~123~~	~~123~~	—	—
