= Antti Everi =

Finnish weightlifter (born 1981)

Personal information
- Nationality: Finland
- Born: 22 December 1981 (age 44) Huittinen, Finland
- Height: 1.85 m (6 ft 1 in)
- Weight: 130 kg (287 lb)

Sport
- Sport: Weightlifting
- Event: +105 kg
- Club: Tampereen Pyrintö
- Coached by: Jaakko Kailajärvi

Antti Everi (born 22 December 1981) is a Finnish weightlifter. Everi represented Finland at the 2008 Summer Olympics in Beijing, where he competed for the men's super heavyweight category (+105 kg). Everi placed eleventh in this event, as he successfully lifted 171 kg in the single-motion snatch, and hoisted 195 kg in the two-part, shoulder-to-overhead clean and jerk, for a total of 366 kg.
