= Dung Williams =

Nigerian weightlifter

Personal information
- Full name: Dung Williams
- Born: 3 March 1990 (age 36)
- Weight: 107.35 kg (236.7 lb)

Sport
- Country: Nigeria
- Sport: Weightlifting
- Weight class: +105 kg
- Team: National team
- Updated on 19 October 2016

Dung Williams (born 3 March 1990) is a Nigerian weightlifter who competes in super heavyweight events. He represented Nigeria at the 2014 Commonwealth Games and is a multiple-time medalist at the Nigerian National Sports Festival.

== Career ==
=== International Competition ===
Williams made an international appearance representing the Nigerian national team at the 2014 Commonwealth Games in Glasgow, Scotland. Competing in the men's +105 kg category (the heaviest weight class at the games), he finished 11th overall. During the event, he successfully lifted 135 kg on his first snatch attempt before missing his subsequent 142 kg attempts. In the clean and jerk, he secured a 170 kg lift on his first try, missing his two 175 kg attempts. This gave him a combined total of 305 kg.

Year	Venue	Weight	Snatch (kg)				Clean & Jerk (kg)				Total	Rank
Year	Venue	Weight	1	2	3	Rank	1	2	3	Rank	Total	Rank
Commonwealth Games
2014	Glasgow, Scotland	+105 kg	135	~~142~~	~~142~~	—N/a	170	~~175~~	~~175~~	—N/a	305	11

=== Domestic Career ===
Following his international appearances, Williams remained active in the Nigerian domestic weightlifting circuit. In December 2018, he represented Plateau State at the 19th National Sports Festival held in Abuja, Nigeria. Competing in the super heavyweight category, he won two bronze medals, recording a 133 kg lift to secure his spot on the podium and contribute to Plateau State's overall medal count.
