= Ben Turner (weightlifter) =

Australian weightlifter (born 1984)

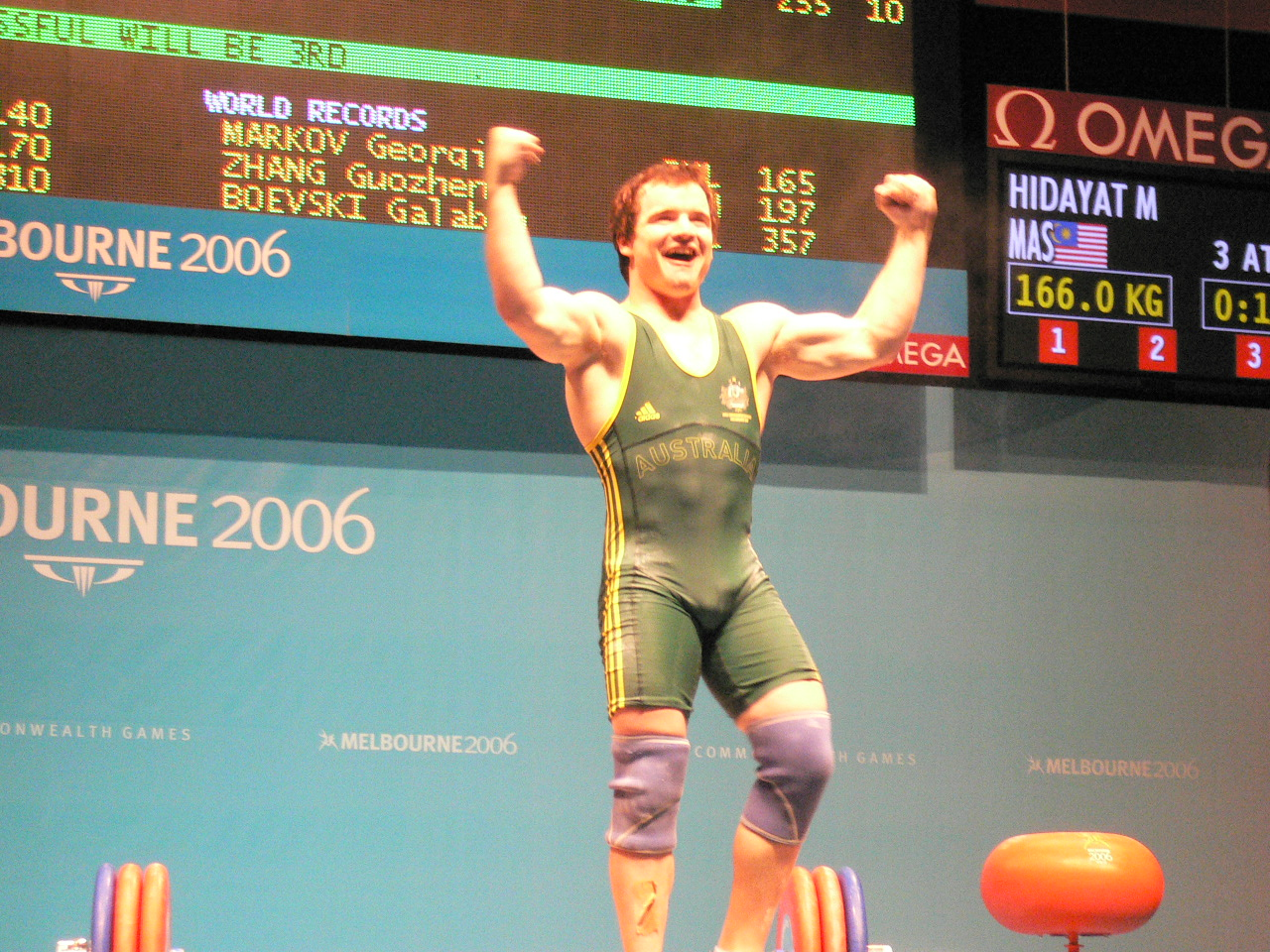
- Ben Turner in 2006.

Personal information
- Full name: Benjamin Alexander Turner
- Nationality: Australia
- Born: 23 January 1984 (age 42) Brisbane, Queensland, Australia
- Height: 5 ft 6 in (1.68 m)
- Weight: 69 kg (152 lb)

Sport
- Sport: Weightlifting
- Event: –69/77kg
- Club: Cougars Weightlifting Club
Medal record
Representing Australia
Men's weightlifting
Commonwealth Games
Gold medal – first place	2006 Melbourne	69 kg Weightlifting
Silver medal – second place	2010 Delhi	77 kg Weightlifting

Ben Turner (born 23 January 1984 in Brisbane) is an Australian weightlifter best known for his performances at the 2006 Commonwealth Games in Melbourne, where he won the gold medal in the 69 kg category, and the 2010 Commonwealth Games in New Delhi, India, where he won Silver in the 77 kg category. Turner is also a coach.

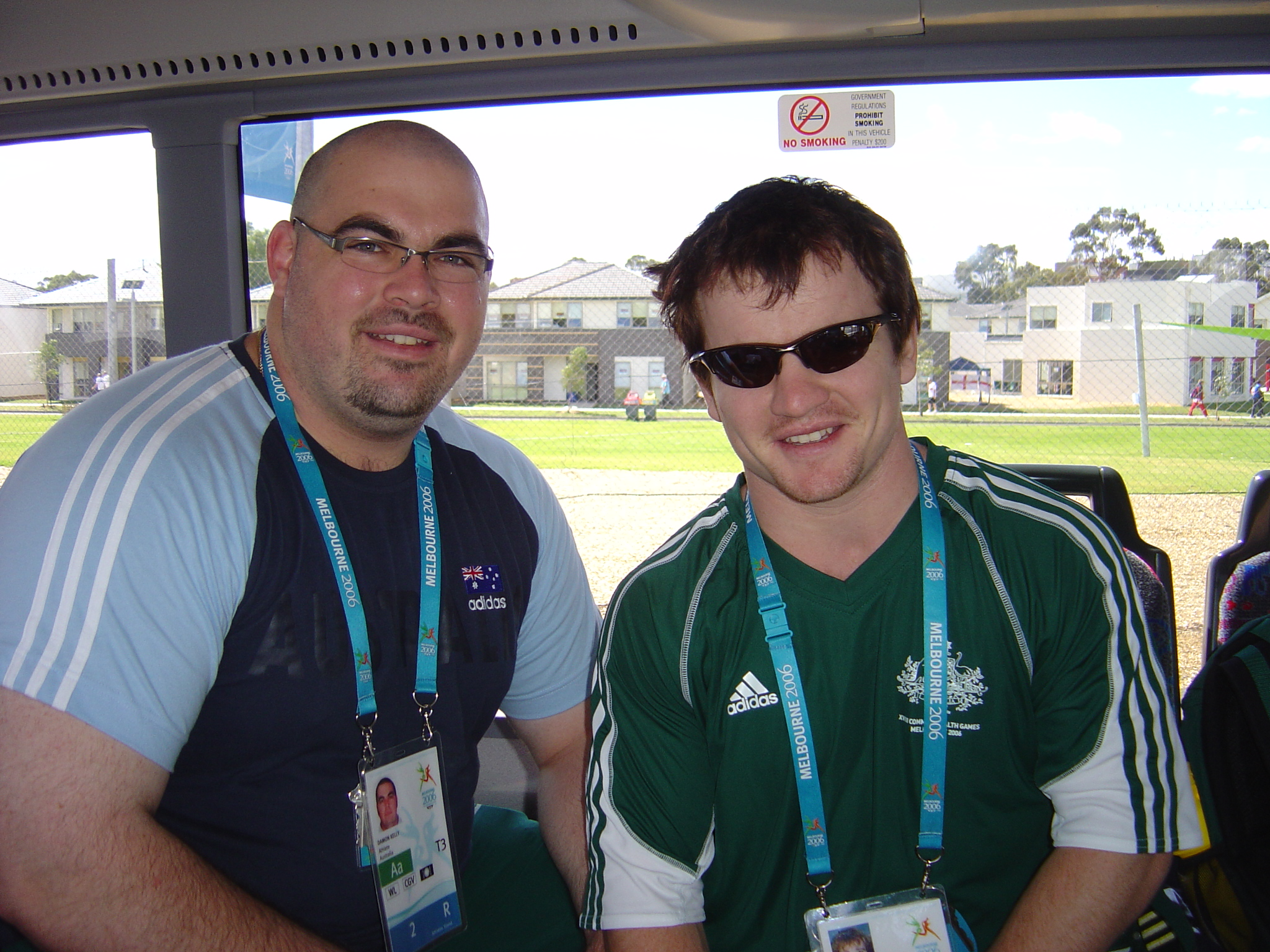
Turner and silver medalist in the Super Heavyweight Division Damon Kelly at the 2006 Commonwealth Games in Melbourne
