= Weightlifting at the 2010 Commonwealth Games =

- Venue: Jawaharlal Nehru Stadium
- Location: Delhi, India
- Dates: 4 to 12 October 2010

Weightlifting at the 2010 Commonwealth Games was the 16th appearance of Weightlifting at the Commonwealth Games. The weightlifting events at the 2010 Commonwealth Games were held at the Jawaharlal Nehru Stadium, in Delhi, India, from 4 to 12 October 2010.

== Medal table ==
* Host nation (India)

Rank	Nation	Gold	Silver	Bronze	Total
1	Nigeria	5	4	5	14
2	Samoa	3	0	0	3
3	India*	2	2	4	8
4	Australia	2	2	1	5
5	Canada	2	1	2	5
5	Malaysia	2	1	2	5
7	Nauru	1	1	0	2
8	New Zealand	0	2	0	2
9	Sri Lanka	0	1	1	2
10	Scotland	0	1	0	1
10	Seychelles	0	1	0	1
10	Wales	0	1	0	1
13	Cameroon	0	0	1	1
13	England	0	0	1	1
Totals (14 entries)		17	17	17	51

== Events ==
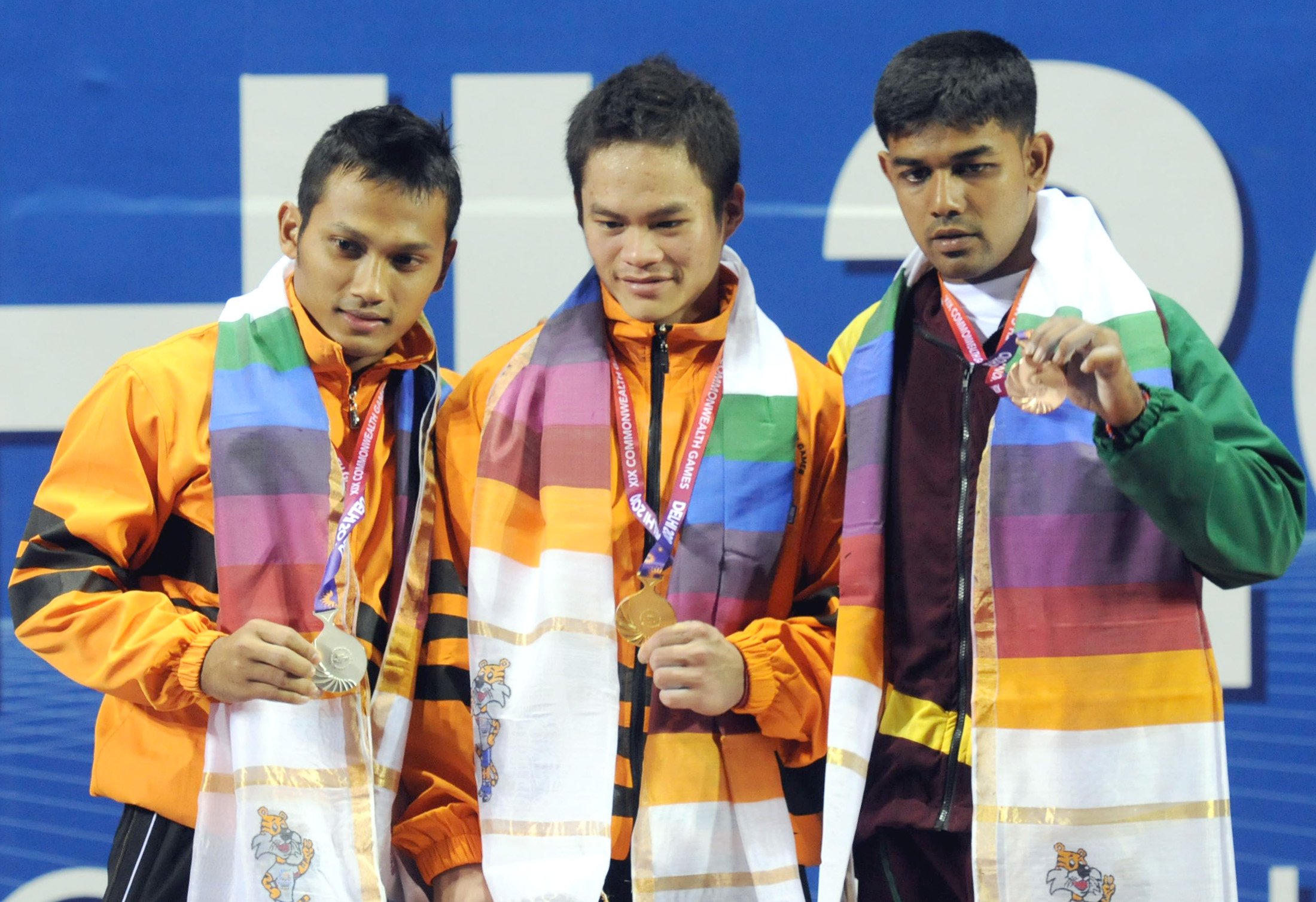
XIX Commonwealth Games-2010 Delhi Winners of 62 Kg Men Weightlifting, Jumitih Arico of Malaysia (Gold), Medal Winner Mahayudin Naharudin of Malaysia (Silver) and Kurukulasooriyage Anton Sudesh Peiris of Sri Lanka (Bronze)

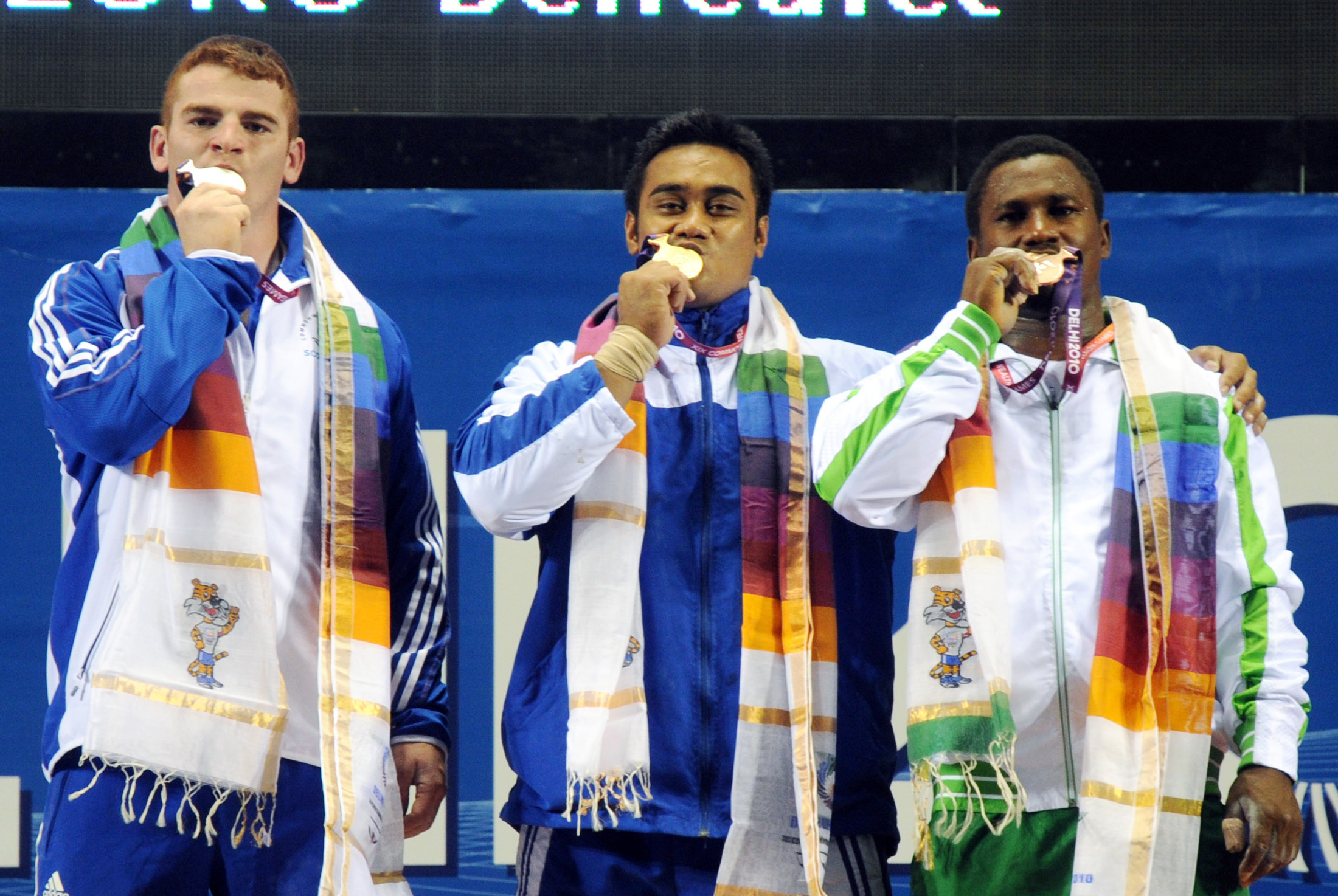
XIX Commonwealth Games-2010 Delhi Winners of (Men’s Weightlifting 94Kg), Faavae Faauliuli of Samao (Gold), Peter Kirkbride of Scotland (Silver) and Benedict Uloko of Nigeria (Bronze)

== Medallists ==
=== Men's events ===
Event	Gold	Silver	Bronze
56 kg	Amirul Hamizan Ibrahim; Malaysia	Sukhen Dey; India	Valluri Srinivasa Rao; India
62 kg	Aricco Jumitih; Malaysia	Naharudin Mahayudin; Malaysia	Sudesh Peiris; Sri Lanka
69 kg	Ravi Kumar Katulu; India	Chinthana Vidanage; Sri Lanka	Mohd Hafifi Mansor; Malaysia
77 kg	Yukio Peter; Nauru	Ben Turner; Australia	Sudhir Kumar Chitradurga; India
85 kg	Simplice Ribouem; Australia	Richard Patterson; New Zealand	Mathieu Marineau; Canada
94 kg	Faavae Faauliuli; Samoa	Peter Kirkbride; Scotland	Benedict Uloko; Nigeria
105 kg	Niusila Opeloge; Samoa	Stanislav Chalaev; New Zealand	Curtis Onaghinor; Nigeria
+105 kg	Damon Kelly; Australia	Itte Detenamo; Nauru	George Kobaladze; Canada

=== Women's events ===
Event	Gold	Silver	Bronze
48 kg	Augustina Nkem Nwaokolo; Nigeria	Ngangbam Soniya Chanu; India	Sandhya Rani Devi; India
53 kg	Marilou Dozois-Prevost; Canada	Onyeka Azike; Nigeria	Raihan Yusoff; Malaysia
58 kg	Renu Bala Chanu; India	Seen Lee; Australia	Zoe Smith; England
63 kg	Obioma Agatha Okoli; Nigeria	Michaela Breeze; Wales	Marie Josephe Fegue; Cameroon
69 kg	Christine Girard; Canada	Janet Marie Georges; Seychelles	Itohan Ebireguesele; Nigeria
75 kg	Hadiza Zakari; Nigeria	Marie-Ève Beauchemin-Nadeau; Canada	Laishram Monika Devi; India
+75 kg	Ele Opeloge; Samoa	Maryam Usman; Nigeria	Deborah Acason; Australia

=== Powerlifting ===
Event	Gold	Silver	Bronze
Open Men	Yakubu Adesokan; Nigeria	Anthony Ulonnam; Nigeria	Ikechukwu Obichukwu; Nigeria
Open Women	Esther Oyema; Nigeria	Ganiyatu Onaolapo; Nigeria	Osamwenyobor Arasomwan; Nigeria

== Participating nations ==
- Australia (19)
- Bangladesh (8)
- Barbados (1)
- Cameroon (9)
- Canada (15)
- Cook Islands (2)
- Cyprus (5)
- England (13)
- Ghana (10)
- India (21)
- Kenya (6)
- Kiribati (5)
- Malawi (3)
- Malaysia (18)
- Mauritius (4)
- Namibia (1)
- Nauru (6)
- New Zealand (7)
- Nigeria (17)
- Niue (2)
- New Zealand (6)
- Pakistan (7)
- Papua New Guinea (11)
- Samoa (10)
- Scotland (3)
- Seychelles (5)
- Singapore (2)
- Solomon Islands (2)
- South Africa (5)
- Sri Lanka (9)
- Swaziland (2)
- Tanzania (1)
- Tonga (1)
- Turks and Caicos Islands (2)
- Tuvalu (2)
- Uganda (6)
- Vanuatu (1)
- Wales (6)
