= Pat Mendes =

American-Brazilian weightlifter

Personal information
- Born: 1990 (age 35–36) Las Vegas, United States

Sport
- Sport: Weightlifting

Patrick Earth Mendes (born c. 1990) is an American-Brazilian weightlifter. He was the heavyweight USA national champion in 2011 and 2012. He was suspended by the United States Anti-Doping Agency for two years (began March 19, 2012) for using human growth hormone. It has been reported that he tested positive for a banned substance a second time at the 2015 Pan Am Games.
