= Corran Hocking =

Australian weightlifter (born 1980)

Personal information
- Full name: Corran Hocking
- Born: 29 July 1980 (age 46)
- Weight: 151.00 kg (332.90 lb)

Sport
- Country: Australia
- Sport: Weightlifting
- Weight class: +105 kg
- Team: National team
Medal record
Commonwealth Games
Silver medal – second place	2002 Manchester	105+ kg clean & jerk
Bronze medal – third place	2002 Manchester	105+ kg combined
- Updated on 7 September 2016

Corran Hocking (born 29 July 1980) is an Australian male weightlifter, competing in the +105 kg category and representing Australia at international competitions. He competed at world championships, most recently at the 2009 World Weightlifting Championships.

In 2005, Hocking was banned for two years for doping (benzylpiperazine).

== Major results ==
Year	Venue	Weight	Snatch (kg)				Clean & Jerk (kg)				Total	Rank
Year	Venue	Weight	1	2	3	Rank	1	2	3	Rank	Total	Rank
World Championships
2009	Goyang, South Korea	+105 kg	173	~~177~~	~~177~~	10	195	~~200~~	~~200~~	16	368	16
2003	Vancouver, Canada	+105 kg	170	175	~~177.5~~	21	~~202.5~~	202.5	~~207.5~~	24	377.5	21
