= Ihor Shymechko =

Ukrainian weightlifter

Personal information
- Born: May 27, 1986 (age 40) Lviv, Ukrainian SSR, Soviet Union
- Height: 1.97 m (6 ft 5 1/2 in)
- Weight: 130 kg (290 lb)

Sport
- Country: Ukraine
- Sport: Weightlifting
- Event: +105 kg

Ihor Myronovych Shymechko (Ukrainian: Ігор Миронович Шимечко; born 27 May 1986, in Lviv) is a Ukrainian weightlifter.

== Career ==
He competed at the 2008 and 2012 Summer Olympics in the +105 kg event, finishing in 5th and 4th place respectively.

Shymechko was European champion in 2009 and won the silver medal in 2011 in the +105 kg division. He competed at the 2016 Summer Olympics in the Men's +105 kg.

Since 1 May 2017, he has been married to Ukrainian weightlifter Yuliya Kalina.
