= Sheba Deireragea =

Nauruan weightlifter

Personal information
- Nationality: Nauruan
- Born: 28 May 1986 (age 40)
Medal record
Representing Nauru
Women's weightlifting
Commonwealth Games
Bronze medal – third place	2002 Manchester	95kg
Bronze medal – third place	2002 Manchester	100kg
Bronze medal – third place	2002 Manchester	110kg
Silver medal – second place	2006 Melbourne	75kg

Sheba Deireragea (born 28 May 1986) is a Nauruan weightlifter. In 2006 her mother Marjorie was listed as her influence and weightlifter Marcus Stephen as her "sports idol." Sheba Deireragea won three bronze medals for Nauru at the 2002 Commonwealth Games and also won a silver medal for Nauru at the 2006 Commonwealth Games.
