= George Kobaladze =

Canadian weightlifter (born 1976)

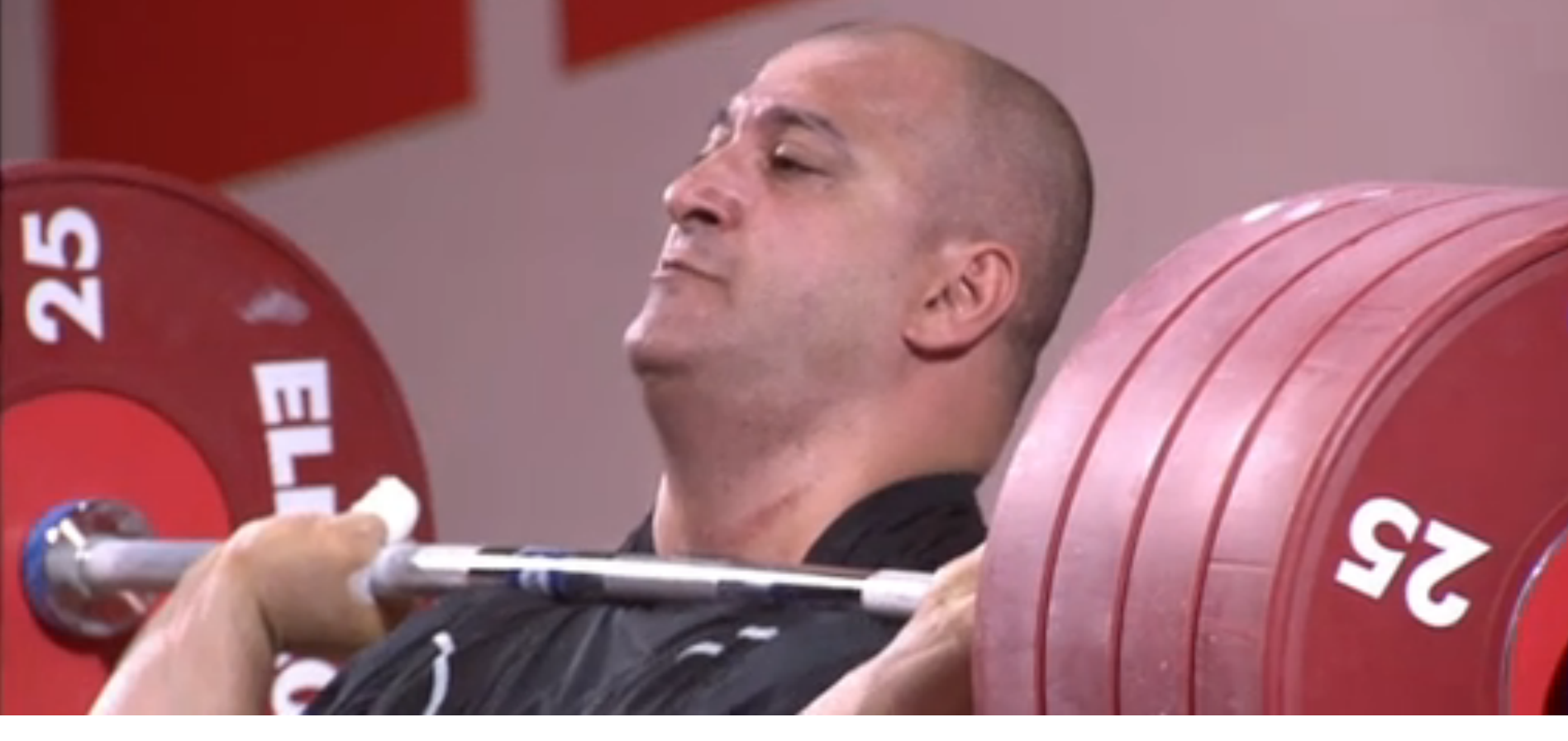
- Glasgow 2014: clean-and-jerk at 229 kg

Personal information
- Born: 24 May 1976 (age 50) Tskhinvali, South Ossetia AO, Georgian SSR, Soviet Union
- Height: 1.86 m (6 ft 1 in)
- Weight: 139 kg (306 lb; 21.9 st)
- Website: GeorgeKobaladze.com

Sport
- Country: Georgia; Canada
- Sport: Weightlifting
- Event: +105 kg
- Club: Géants de Montréal
- Coached by: Gilles Poirier
Medal record
Men's weightlifting
Representing Canada
Commonwealth Games
| Gold medal – first place | 2014 Glasgow | –+105 kg |
| Bronze medal – third place | 2010 Delhi | +105 kg |
Pan American Games
| Silver medal – second place | 2015 Toronto | +105 kg |
| Bronze medal – third place | 2011 Guadalajara | +105 kg |
Pan American Championships
| Silver medal – second place | 2012 Antigua | +105 kg |
| Silver medal – second place | 2013 Isla Margarita | +105 kg |

George Kobaladze (born 24 May 1976 in Tskhinvali, South Ossetian AO, Georgian SSR, Soviet Union) is a Georgian–Canadian weightlifter who has attained numerous successes at prestigious international competitions in the super-heavyweight category (+105 kg), including:

- gold medal and Commonwealth Games records (clean and jerk and total) at the 2014 Commonwealth Games in Glasgow, Scotland;
- silver medal at the 2015 Pan American Games in Toronto, Ontario, Canada;
- silver medal at the 2013 Pan American Championships in Isla Margarita, Venezuela;
- silver medal at the 2012 Pan American Championships in Antigua Guatemala, Guatemala;
- bronze medal at the 2011 Pan American Games in Guadalajara, Mexico;
- bronze medal at the 2010 Commonwealth Games in Delhi, India

George Kobaladze is a seven-time Canadian champion and five-time Canada's Best Male Lifter (2014, 2013, 2012, 2011 and 2009).

The athlete currently holds the Canadian records in the superheavyweight class, with 175 kg lift in the snatch, 227 kg lift in the clean and jerk for a total of 402 kg (both lifts combined). These records were set at the 2014 Canadian Championships, held in Saskatoon, Saskatchewan. Kobaladze is the first Canadian weightlifter to lift 500 pounds (the 227 kg clean and jerk) and the first Canadian to cross the 400 kg line in the total.

At the 2013 World Championships held in Wrocław, Poland, the Canadian weightlifter earned 11th place.

In 2013, the Montrealer also participated in the very popular Arnold's Classic Sport Festival, where he ranked 2nd under the Sinclair formula.

| Year | Event | Location | Weight Category | Snatch | Clean and Jerk | Total | Rank |
|---|---|---|---|---|---|---|---|
| 2015 | Pan American Games | Toronto | +105 kg | 168 kg | 208 kg | 376 kg | (silver) |
| 2014 | World Championships | Almaty | +105 kg | 173 kg | 221 kg | 394 kg | 16 |
| 2014 | Commonwealth Games | Glasgow | +105 kg | 171 kg | 229 kg GR | 400 kg GR | (gold) |
| 2013 | World Championships | Wrocław | +105 kg | 174 kg | 223 kg | 397 kg | 11 |
| 2013 | Pan Am Championships | Isla Margarita | +105 kg | 171 kg | 218 kg | 389 kg | 2 |
| 2013 | Arnold Weightlifting Championships | Columbus, Ohio | +105 kg | 172 kg | 225 kg | 397 kg | 2 |
| 2012 | Pan Am Championships | Antigua | +105 kg | 171 kg | 219 kg | 390 kg | 2 |
| 2011 | World Championships | Paris | +105 kg | 169 kg | 220 kg | 389 kg | 19 |
| 2011 | Pan American Games | Guadalajara | +105 kg | 170 kg | 223 kg | 393 kg | (bronze) |
| 2010 | World Championships | Antalya | +105 kg | 165 kg | 212 kg | 377 kg | 19 |
| 2010 | Commonwealth Games | Delhi | +105 kg | 168 kg | 218 kg | 386 kg | (bronze) |
| 2009 | World Championships | Goyang | +105 kg | 166 kg | 212 kg | 378 kg | 14 |

== Personal bests ==
| Lift | Weight | Date |
|---|---|---|
| Snatch | 175 kg* | May 18, 2014 |
| Clean and Jerk | 229 kg*** | July 31, 2014 |
| Total | 402 kg* | May 18, 2014 |
| Total | 400 kg** | July 31, 2014 |

* Canadian Records
*** Canadian and Commonwealth Record
** Commonwealth Record

== Records ==
Records
| Preceded by (Australia) Damon Kelly | Men's +105kg Commonwealth Games Record Holder (C&J); 31 July 2014 – present | Incumbent |
| Preceded by (Nauru) Itte Detenamo | Men's +105kg Commonwealth Games Record Holder; 31 July 2014 – present | Incumbent |
