= Damon Kelly =

Australian weightlifter (born 1983)

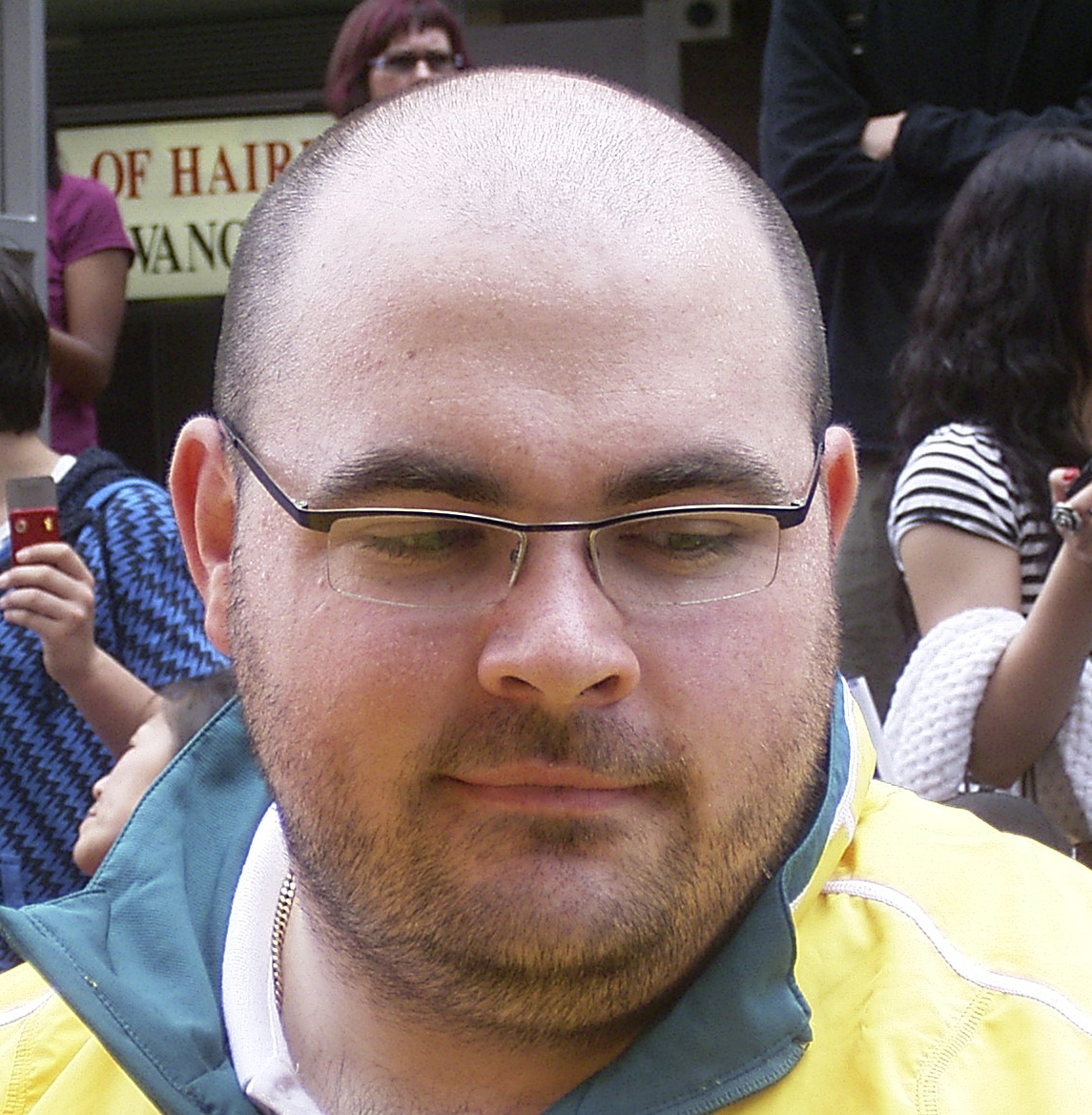

Personal information
- Full name: Damon Joseph Kelly
- Nationality: Australia
- Born: 1 December 1983 (age 42) Atherton, Queensland
- Height: 1.83 m (6 ft 0 in)
- Weight: 151 kg (333 lb)
Medal record
Men's weightlifting
Representing Australia
Commonwealth Games
Gold medal – first place	2010 New Delhi	+105kg
Silver medal – second place	2006 Melbourne	+105kg
Bronze medal – third place	2014 Glasgow	+105kg
Commonwealth Championships
Gold medal – first place	2012 Apia	+105kg
Gold medal – first place	2016 Penang	+105kg
Silver medal – second place	2015 Pune	+105kg
Oceania Championships
Gold medal – first place	2008 Auckland	+105kg
Gold medal – first place	2012 Apia	+105kg
Gold medal – first place	2013 Brisbane	+105kg
Silver medal – second place	2009 Darwin	+105kg
Silver medal – second place	2010 Suva	+105kg
Silver medal – second place	2011 Darwin	+105kg
Silver medal – second place	2016 Suva	+105kg
Silver medal – second place	2017 Gold Coast	+105kg
Arafura Games
Silver medal – second place	2009 Darwin	+105kg
Silver medal – second place	2011 Darwin	+105kg

Damon Joseph Kelly (born 1 December 1983) is an Australian weightlifter who competed at the 2008 Olympic Games finishing ninth. Damon recorded lifts of 165 kg in the Snatch and 221 kg in the Clean and Jerk with a total of 386 kg. He was the biggest member of the Australian Olympic Team and was Australia's only male weightlifter at the Games, having secured the sole position with a personal best lift on his final attempt at the Olympic Nomination Trials.

He competed for Australia again at the 2012 Summer Olympics, finishing 16th with a total of 381 kg (216 in the clean and jerk, and 165 in the snatch).

Kelly won a silver medal at the 2006 Commonwealth Games in the 105 kg+ division and Gold at the 2010 Commonwealth Games in Delhi and holds the Commonwealth Games record for the Clean and Jerk. He has been undefeated at the Australian Championships since 2006 and is also the reigning Oceania champion. At the 2014 Commonwealth Games, he finished third, 12 kg behind the winner.

He started weightlifting as a 14-year-old at St Laurence's College in Brisbane where he also excelled at Rugby Union, playing in the First XV alongside Australian national rugby league team halfback Cooper Cronk, and Shot Put, setting the college record. He trains at Cougars Weightlifting Club in Brisbane under coach Miles Wydall.

== Personal bests ==
Lift	Weight	Date
Snatch	176.0 kg	11 October 2010
Clean & Jerk	222.0 kg	7 June 2008
Total	397.0 kg	11 October 2010

Lift	Weight
Front Squat	270.0 kg
Back Squat	315.0 kg

Records
Preceded by (New Zealand) Nigel Avery	Men's 105kg+ Clean and Jerk Commonwealth Games Record Holder; 23 March 2006 – 31 July 2014	Succeeded by (Canada) George Kobaladze
