= Itte Detenamo =

Nauruan weightlifter

Personal information
- Nationality: Nauruan
- Born: 22 September 1986 (age 39)
- Height: 1.7 m (5 ft 7 in)
- Weight: 172 kg (379 lb)

Sport
- Country: Nauru
- Sport: Weightlifting
- Event: Men's +105kg
Medal record
Men's weightlifting
Representing Nauru
Commonwealth Games
Silver medal – second place	2010 New Delhi	+105 kg
Silver medal – second place	2014 Glasgow	+105 kg
Bronze medal – third place	2006 Melbourne	+105 kg
Pacific Games
Gold medal – first place	2007 Apia	+105 kg
Gold medal – first place	2011 Nouméa	+105 kg
Gold medal – first place	2015 Port Moresby	+105 kg
Commonwealth Championships
Gold medal – first place	2009 Penang	+105 kg
Gold medal – first place	2013 Penang	+105 kg
Gold medal – first place	2015 Pune	+105 kg
Silver medal – second place	2012 Apia	+105 kg
Oceania Championships
Gold medal – first place	2006 Apia	+105 kg
Gold medal – first place	2007 Apia	+105 kg
Gold medal – first place	2009 Darwin (Note: 2009 Arafura Games also)	+105 kg
Gold medal – first place	2010 Suva	+105 kg
Gold medal – first place	2011 Darwin (Note: 2011 Arafura Games also)	+105 kg
Gold medal – first place	2014 Le Mont-Dore	+105 kg
Gold medal – first place	2015 Port Moresby	+105 kg
Gold medal – first place	2016 Suva	+105 kg
Silver medal – second place	2008 Auckland	+105 kg
Silver medal – second place	2012 Apia	+105 kg

Itte Junior Ronson Detenamo (born 22 September 1986 in Buada) is a Nauruan weightlifter competing in the +105 kg category.

Detenamo represented Nauru at the 2004 Summer Olympics in Athens, finishing 14th in the men's 105+kg category. He won a bronze medal at the 2006 Commonwealth Games, and three gold medals at the 2007 South Pacific Games.

He was Nauru's sole representative at the 2008 Summer Olympics in Beijing. He achieved a personal best by lifting 386 kg in the super-heavyweight category.

He took part in the 2010 Commonwealth Games, and after being described as Nauru's best hope for a gold medal there, he won silver.

He was also a participant at the 2012 Summer Olympics, finishing 14th.

At the 2014 Commonwealth Games, he was Nauru's flagbearer.

Detenamo's father and older sister are also weightlifters, as are other members of his family. His father introduced him to the sport, which Detenamo took up at the age of 10.

== Major results ==
Year	Venue	Weight	Snatch (kg)				Clean & Jerk (kg)				Total	Rank
Year	Venue	Weight	1	2	3	Rank	1	2	3	Rank	Total	Rank
Representing Nauru
Olympic Games
2012	(United Kingdom) London, Great Britain	+105 kg	165	170	175	14	205	~~215~~	215	15	390	13
2008	Beijing, China	+105 kg	165	170	175	9	205	210	~~215~~	10	385	10
2004	Athens, Greece	+105 kg	147.5	152.5	155.0	16	192.5	~~197.5~~	—	14	347.5	14
World Championships
2015	Houston, United States	+105 kg	160	~~165~~	165	27	200	207	~~211~~	24	372	24
2011	Paris, France	+105 kg	175	~~180~~	180	18	222	228	~~232~~	7	408	10
2009	Goyang, South Korea	+105 kg	165	170	~~174~~	15	206	211	~~215~~	14	381	12
2007	Chiang Mai, Thailand	+105 kg	160	165	170	18	~~200~~	200	~~205~~	24	370	20
2006	Santo Domingo, Dominican Republic	+105 kg	158	163	167	16	~~200~~	200	203	14	370	15
2003	Vancouver, Canada	+105 kg	~~150.0~~	150.0	~~155.0~~	31	190.0	195.0	~~202.5~~	25	345	26
Commonwealth Games
2018	Gold Coast, Australia	+105 kg	~~160~~	~~160~~	~~160~~	—	—	—	—	—	—	—
2014	(United Kingdom) Glasgow, Great Britain	+105 kg	170	174	~~177~~	1	216	222	~~229~~	2	396	2nd place, silver medalist(s)
2010	Delhi, India	+105 kg	172	176	179	1	~~218~~	~~218~~	218	3	397	2nd place, silver medalist(s)
2006	Melbourne, Australia	+105 kg	150	160	~~167~~	3	190	200	~~208~~	3	360	3rd place, bronze medalist(s)
Pacific Games
2015	Port Moresby, Papua New Guinea	+105 kg	157	161	167	1st place, gold medalist(s)	200	203	—	1st place, gold medalist(s)	370	1st place, gold medalist(s)

Medalbox notes
