= Nauru at the 1990 Commonwealth Games =

Sporting event delegation

Flag of Nauru

Nauru was represented at the 1990 Commonwealth Games in Auckland by a single athlete, weightlifter Marcus Stephen, who would later become his country's President in 2007. The 1990 Games marked Nauru's first participation in the Commonwealth Games. Stephen competed in three events only, and won medals in all three, including one gold.

== Medals ==
	(gold)	(silver)	(bronze)	Total
Nauru	1	2	0	0

=== Gold ===
- Marcus Stephen, Weightlifting, Men's 60 kg Snatch

=== Silver ===
- Marcus Stephen, Weightlifting, Men's 60 kg Clean and Jerk
- Marcus Stephen, Weightlifting, Men's 62 kg Combined

=== Bronze ===
none

== Sources ==
- Official results
