= Sri Lanka at the Commonwealth Games =

- CG code: SRI
- CGA: National Olympic Committee of Sri Lanka
- Website: olympic.lk
- Medals Ranked 27th: Gold 5 Silver 10 Bronze 11 Total 26

Commonwealth Games appearances (overview)
- 1938; 1950; 1954; 1958; 1962; 1966; 1970; 1974; 1978; 1982; 1986; 1990; 1994; 1998; 2002; 2006; 2010; 2014; 2018; 2022; 2026; 2030

Sri Lanka have participated in all but three Commonwealth Games since 1938, with the only ones missed being the 1954, 1974 and 1986 Games. Sri Lanka have won twenty medals at the Games, but had a 44-year medal drought spanning 1950 to 1994. Until 1974, Sri Lanka competed under the name Ceylon.

== List of Games Bids ==
Year	Bid Host City, Province
2018 Commonwealth Games	Hambantota, Southern Province

== Overall Medal Tally ==
Games	Gold	Silver	Bronze	Total
1930 Hamilton	did not attend			
1934 London	did not attend			
1938 Sydney	1	0	0	1
1950 Auckland	1	2	1	4
1954 Vancouver	did not attend			
1958 Cardiff	0	0	0	0
1962 Perth	0	0	0	0
1966 Kingston	0	0	0	0
1970 Edinburgh	0	0	0	0
1974 Christchurch	did not attend			
1978 Edmonton	0	0	0	0
1982 Brisbane	0	0	0	0
1986 Edinburgh	did not attend			
1990 Auckland	0	0	0	0
1994 Victoria	1	2	0	3
1998 Kuala Lumpur	0	1	1	2
2002 Manchester	0	0	0	0
2006 Melbourne	1	0	0	1
2010 Delhi	0	1	1	2
2014 Glasgow	0	1	0	1
2018 Gold Coast	0	1	5	6
2022 Birmingham	0	1	3	4
2026 Glasgow	1	1	0	2
Total	5	10	11	26

== List of medalists ==
Medal	Name	Games	Sport	Event
Gold	Barney Henricus	1938 Sydney	Boxing	Featherweight (57 kg)
Gold	Duncan White	1950 Auckland	Athletics	Men's 440 yards hurdles
Gold	Pushpamali Ramanayake; Malini Wickramasinghe	1994 Victoria	Shooting	Women's Air Rifle – Pairs
Gold	Chinthana Vidanage	2006 Melbourne	Weightlifting	Men's 62 kg
Gold	Rumesh Tharanga	2026 Glasgow	Athletics	Men's javelin throw
Silver	K. Edwin	1950 Auckland	Boxing	Flyweight
Silver	Albert Perera	1950 Auckland	Boxing	Bantamweight
Silver	Dodangoda Chandrasiri; Lakshman Rajasinghe	1994 Victoria	Shooting	Men's Small Bore Rifle, Prone – Pairs
Silver	Malini Wickramasinghe	1994 Victoria	Shooting	Women's Air Rifle
Silver	Sriyani Kulawansha	1998 Kuala Lumpur	Athletics	Women's 100 m hurdles
Silver	Chinthana Vidanage	2010 Delhi	Weightlifting	Men's 69 kg
Silver	Sudesh Peiris	2014 Glasgow	Weightlifting	Men's 62 kg
Silver	Indika Dissanayake	2018 Gold Coast	Weightlifting	Men's 69 kg
Silver	Palitha Bandara	2022 Birmingham	Athletics	Men's discus throw F44/64
Silver	Palitha Bandara	2026 Glasgow	Athletics	Men's discus throw F44
Bronze	Alex Obeysekere	1950 Auckland	Boxing	Welterweight
Bronze	Sugath Thilakaratne	1998 Kuala Lumpur	Athletics	Men's 400 m
Bronze	Sudesh Peiris	2010 Delhi	Weightlifting	Men's 62 kg
Bronze	Chaturanga Lakmal	2018 Gold Coast	Weightlifting	Men's 56 kg
Bronze	Dinusha Gomes	2018 Gold Coast	Weightlifting	Women's 48 kg
Bronze	Anusha Koddithuwakku	2018 Gold Coast	Boxing	Women's 48 kg
Bronze	Thiwanka Ranasinghe	2018 Gold Coast	Boxing	Men's 49 kg
Bronze	Vidanalange Bandara	2018 Gold Coast	Boxing	Men's 52 kg
Bronze	Dilanka Isuru Kumara	2022 Birmingham	Weightlifting	Men's 55 kg
Bronze	Yupun Abeykoon	2022 Birmingham	Athletics	Men's 100 metres
Bronze	Nethmi Poruthotage	2022 Birmingham	Wrestling	Women's freestyle 57 kg

=== Overall Medal Tally by Sport ===
Sport	Gold	Silver	Bronze	Total
Athletics	2	3	2	7
Weightlifting	1	3	4	8
Boxing	1	2	4	7
Shooting	1	2	0	3
Wrestling	0	0	1	1
Totals (5 entries)	5	10	11	26

== Numbers of athletes and sports ==
This list shows the total number of athletes, male and female, and the total sports they were selected to compete in.

Year	Athletes	Male	Female	Sports
2026	40	27	13	6
2022	110	50	60	13
2018	79	50	29	13
2014	103	70	33	13
2010	93	73	20	14
2006	67			
2002	56	31	25	
1998				
1994				
1990				
1982				
1978				
1970				
1966				
1962				
1958				
1950				
1938				
