= Weightlifting at the 2010 Commonwealth Games – Men's 62 kg =

The men's 62 kg weightlifting competition took place on 5 October. The weightlifter from Malaysia won the gold, with a combined lift of 276 kg.

== Athletes ==
21 lifters were selected for the games.

| | Athlete | Year of birth |
|---|---|---|
| 1 | D. M. I. Chathuranga Dissanayake (SRI) | 1989 |
| 2 | Brown Ramohaka (SOL) | 1988 |
| 3 | Charles Ssekyaaya (UGA) | 1994 |
| 4 | Charles Chauyauya (MAW) | 1993 |
| 5 | Ioane Haumili (TUV) | 1988 |
| 6 | Michael Elborn Taufa (TON) | 1993 |
| 7 | Christopher Freebury (ENG) | 1989 |
| 8 | Tuau Lapua Lapua (TUV) | 1991 |
| 9 | Cameron Sinclair (NZL) | 1987 |
| 10 | B. E. Vannara (AUS) | 1988 |
| 11 | Muhammad Ishtiaq Ghafoor (PAK) | 1978 |
| 12 | Dimitris Minasidis (CYP) | 1989 |
| 13 | Jasvir Singh (CAN) | 1977 |
| 14 | Naharudin Mahayudin (MAS) | 1984 |
| 15 | Gareth Evans (WAL) | 1986 |
| 16 | Daniel Koum (AUS) | 1985 |
| 17 | Rustam Sarang (IND) | 1988 |
| 18 | Simon Isidore Ngamba (CMR) | 1982 |
| 19 | Aricco Jumith (MAS) | 1990 |
| 20 | Omkar Shekhar Otari (IND) | 1987 |
| 21 | Sudesh Peiris (SRI) | 1985 |

== Results ==
| Rank | Name | Country | Group | B.weight (kg) | Snatch (kg) | Clean & Jerk (kg) | Total (kg) |
|---|---|---|---|---|---|---|---|
| 1st place, gold medalist(s) | Aricco Jumitih | Malaysia | A | 61.25 | 120 | 156 | 276 |
| 2nd place, silver medalist(s) | Naharudin Mahayudin | Malaysia | A | 61.69 | 125 | 150 | 275 |
| 3rd place, bronze medalist(s) | Sudesh Peiris | Sri Lanka | A | 61.85 | 120 | 152 | 272 |
| 4 | Rustam Sarang | India | A | 61.70 | 121 | 150 | 271 |
| 5 | Omkar Shekhar Otari | India | A | 61.76 | 125 | 140 | 265 |
| 6 | Daniel Koum Koum | Australia | A | 61.85 | 119 | 145 | 264 |
| 7 | Muhammad Ishtiaq Ghafoor | Pakistan | A | 61.47 | 115 | 145 | 260 |
| 8 | Vannara Be | Australia | A | 61.53 | 116 | 142 | 258 |
| 9 | D. M. I. Chathuranga Dissanayake | Sri Lanka | B | 61.92 | 115 | 140 | 255 |
| 10 | Dimitris Minasidis | Cyprus | A | 61.76 | 117 | 135 | 252 |
| 11 | Cameron Sinclair | New Zealand | B | 60.36 | 113 | 138 | 251 |
| 12 | Gareth Evans | Wales | A | 61.64 | 111 | 135 | 246 |
| 13 | Simon Isidore Ngamba | Cameroon | A | 61.66 | 115 | 130 | 245 |
| 14 | Charles Ssekyaaya | Uganda | B | 61.41 | 106 | 137 | 243 |
| 15 | Christopher Freebury | England | B | 61.66 | 110 | 125 | 235 |
| 16 | Tuau Lapua Lapua | Tuvalu | B | 61.39 | 100 | 120 | 220 |
| 17 | Brown Ramohaka | Solomon Islands | B | 60.57 | 90 | 125 | 215 |
| 18 | Michael Elborn Taufa | Tonga | B | 61.66 | 95 | 120 | 215 |
| 19 | Ioane Haumili | Tuvalu | B | 61.53 | 90 | 120 | 210 |
| 20 | Daniel Darko | Ghana | B | 61.14 | 85 | 115 | 200 |
| 21 | Charles Chauyauya | Malawi | B | 60.94 | 85 | 108 | 193 |
| – | Jasvir Singh | Canada | A | 61.32 | 110 | – | DNF |

== See also ==
- 2010 Commonwealth Games
- Weightlifting at the 2010 Commonwealth Games
