= List of Ugandan records in Olympic weightlifting =

The following are the national records in Olympic weightlifting in Uganda. Records are maintained in each weight class for the snatch lift, clean and jerk lift, and the total for both lifts by the Uganda Weightlifting Federation.

== Current records ==
=== Men ===
Event	Record	Athlete	Date	Meet	Place	Ref
60 kg
Snatch	100 kg	Davis Niyoyita	3 October 2025	World Championships	Førde, Norway	
Clean & Jerk	125 kg	Davis Niyoyita	3 October 2025	World Championships	Førde, Norway	
Total	225 kg	Davis Niyoyita	3 October 2025	World Championships	Førde, Norway	
65 kg
Snatch	80 kg	Faluku Kyambadde	9 November 2025	Islamic Solidarity Games	Riyadh, Saudi Arabia	
Clean & Jerk	105 kg	Faluku Kyambadde	9 November 2025	Islamic Solidarity Games	Riyadh, Saudi Arabia	
Total	185 kg	Faluku Kyambadde	9 November 2025	Islamic Solidarity Games	Riyadh, Saudi Arabia	
71 kg
Snatch						
Clean & Jerk						
Total						
79 kg
Snatch						
Clean & Jerk						
Total						
88 kg
Snatch						
Clean & Jerk						
Total						
94 kg
Snatch	110 kg	Steven Ojede	11 November 2025	Islamic Solidarity Games	Riyadh, Saudi Arabia	
Clean & Jerk	145 kg	Steven Ojede	11 November 2025	Islamic Solidarity Games	Riyadh, Saudi Arabia	
Total	255 kg	Steven Ojede	11 November 2025	Islamic Solidarity Games	Riyadh, Saudi Arabia	
110 kg
Snatch						
Clean & Jerk						
Total						
+110 kg
Snatch						
Clean & Jerk						
Total						

=== Women ===
Event	Record	Athlete	Date	Meet	Place	Ref
48 kg
Snatch						
Clean & Jerk						
Total						
53 kg
Snatch						
Clean & Jerk						
Total						
58 kg
Snatch						
Clean & Jerk						
Total						
63 kg
Snatch						
Clean & Jerk						
Total						
69 kg
Snatch						
Clean & Jerk						
Total						
77 kg
Snatch						
Clean & Jerk						
Total						
86 kg
Snatch	60 kg	Aisha Namataka	11 November 2025	Islamic Solidarity Games	Riyadh, Saudi Arabia	
Clean & Jerk	80 kg	Aisha Namataka	11 November 2025	Islamic Solidarity Games	Riyadh, Saudi Arabia	
Total	140 kg	Aisha Namataka	11 November 2025	Islamic Solidarity Games	Riyadh, Saudi Arabia	
+86 kg
Snatch						
Clean & Jerk						
Total						

== Historical records ==
=== Men (2018–2025) ===
Event	Record	Athlete	Date	Meet	Place	Ref
55 kg
Snatch	95 kg	Davis Niyoyita	7 December 2021	World Championships	Tashkent, Uzbekistan	
Clean & Jerk	125 kg	Davis Niyoyita	7 December 2021	World Championships	Tashkent, Uzbekistan	
Total	220 kg	Davis Niyoyita	7 December 2021	World Championships	Tashkent, Uzbekistan	
61 kg
Snatch	98 kg	Davis Niyoyita	2 April 2024	World Cup	Phuket, Thailand	
Clean & Jerk	127 kg	Davis Niyoyita	4 September 2023	World Championships	Riyadh, Saudi Arabia	
Total	222 kg	Davis Niyoyita	27 May 2021	African Championships	Nairobi, Kenya	
67 kg
Snatch	100 kg	Julius Ssekitoleko	27 May 2021	African Championships	Nairobi, Kenya	
Clean & Jerk	130 kg	Julius Ssekitoleko	27 May 2021	African Championships	Nairobi, Kenya	
Total	230 kg	Julius Ssekitoleko	27 May 2021	African Championships	Nairobi, Kenya	
73 kg
Snatch	112 kg	Hakim Ssempereza	27 May 2021	African Championships	Nairobi, Kenya	
Clean & Jerk	138 kg	Hakim Ssempereza	27 May 2021	African Championships	Nairobi, Kenya	
Total	250 kg	Hakim Ssempereza	27 May 2021	African Championships	Nairobi, Kenya	
81 kg
Snatch	110 kg	Ivan Masakwe	28 May 2021	African Championships	Nairobi, Kenya	
Clean & Jerk	130 kg	Ivan Masakwe	April 2019	African Championships	Cairo, Egypt	
Total	240 kg	Ivan Masakwe	28 May 2021	African Championships	Nairobi, Kenya	
89 kg
Snatch						
Clean & Jerk						
Total						
96 kg
Snatch	140 kg	Zubairi Kubo	29 May 2021	African Championships	Nairobi, Kenya	
Clean & Jerk	170 kg	Zubairi Kubo	29 May 2021	African Championships	Nairobi, Kenya	
Total	310 kg	Zubairi Kubo	29 May 2021	African Championships	Nairobi, Kenya	
102 kg
Snatch						
Clean & Jerk						
Total						
109 kg
Snatch						
Clean & Jerk						
Total						
+109 kg
Snatch	110 kg	Godfrey Baligeya	17 December 2021	World Championships	Tashkent, Uzbekistan	
Clean & Jerk	145 kg	Godfrey Baligeya	17 December 2021	World Championships	Tashkent, Uzbekistan	
Total	255 kg	Godfrey Baligeya	17 December 2021	World Championships	Tashkent, Uzbekistan	

=== Women (2018–2025) ===
Event	Record	Athlete	Date	Meet	Place	Ref
45 kg
Snatch						
Clean & Jerk						
Total						
49 kg
Snatch						
Clean & Jerk						
Total						
55 kg
Snatch						
Clean & Jerk						
Total						
59 kg
Snatch	55 kg	Shabra Mutesi	12 August 2022	Islamic Solidarity Games	Konya, Turkey	
Clean & Jerk	66 kg	Shabra Mutesi	12 August 2022	Islamic Solidarity Games	Konya, Turkey	
Total	121 kg	Shabra Mutesi	12 August 2022	Islamic Solidarity Games	Konya, Turkey	
64 kg
Snatch	72 kg	Lydia Nakidde	5 April 2024	World Cup	Phuket, Thailand	
Clean & Jerk	92 kg	Lydia Nakidde	5 April 2024	World Cup	Phuket, Thailand	
Total	164 kg	Lydia Nakidde	5 April 2024	World Cup	Phuket, Thailand	
71 kg
Snatch						
Clean & Jerk						
Total						
76 kg
Snatch						
Clean & Jerk						
Total						
81 kg
Snatch						
Clean & Jerk						
Total						
87 kg
Snatch	55 kg	Aisha Namataka	14 March 2024	African Games	Accra, Ghana	
Clean & Jerk	67 kg	Aisha Namataka	14 March 2024	African Games	Accra, Ghana	
Total	122 kg	Aisha Namataka	14 March 2024	African Games	Accra, Ghana	
+87 kg
Snatch						
Clean & Jerk						
Total						

== Historical records ==
=== Men (1998–2018) ===
Event	Record	Athlete	Date	Meet	Place	Ref
56 kg
Snatch						
Clean & Jerk						
Total						
62 kg
Snatch						
Clean & Jerk	150 kg	Charles Ssekyaaya	20 November 2015	World Championships	Houston, United States	
Total	263 kg	Charles Ssekyaaya	20 November 2015	World Championships	Houston, United States	
69 kg
Snatch	117 kg	Charles Ssekyaaya	30 November 2017	World Championships	Anaheim, United States	
Clean & Jerk	157 kg	Charles Ssekyaaya	30 November 2017	World Championships	Anaheim, United States	
Total	274 kg	Charles Ssekyaaya	30 November 2017	World Championships	Anaheim, United States	
77 kg
Snatch						
Clean & Jerk						
Total						
85 kg
Snatch						
Clean & Jerk						
Total						
94 kg
Snatch	120 kg	Kalidi Batuusa	8 April 2018	Commonwealth Games	Gold Coast, Australia	
Clean & Jerk	155 kg	Kalidi Batuusa	8 April 2018	Commonwealth Games	Gold Coast, Australia	
Total	275 kg	Kalidi Batuusa	8 April 2018	Commonwealth Games	Gold Coast, Australia	
105 kg
Snatch						
Clean & Jerk						
Total						
+105 kg
Snatch						
Clean & Jerk						
Total						

=== Women (1998–2018) ===
Event	Record	Athlete	Date	Meet	Place	Ref
48 kg
Snatch						
Clean and jerk						
Total						
53 kg
Snatch						
Clean and jerk						
Total						
58 kg
Snatch						
Clean and jerk						
Total						
63 kg
Snatch	71 kg	Irene Kasuubo	7 April 2018	Commonwealth Games	Gold Coast, Australia	
Clean and jerk	85 kg	Irene Kasuubo	7 April 2018	Commonwealth Games	Gold Coast, Australia	
Total	156 kg	Irene Kasuubo	7 April 2018	Commonwealth Games	Gold Coast, Australia	
69 kg
Snatch						
Clean and jerk						
Total						
75 kg
Snatch						
Clean and jerk						
Total						
+75 kg
Snatch						
Clean and jerk						
Total						
