= 2011 Commonwealth Weightlifting Championships =

Sporting Event

- Host city: Cape Town, South Africa
- Dates: 10–14 October 2011
- Main venue: Good Hope Centre

The 2011 Commonwealth Weightlifting Championships took place at the Good Hope Centre in Cape Town, South Africa from 10 to 14 October 2011. They were held jointly with the 2011 African Championships.

== Medal summary ==
Results shown below are for the senior competition only. Junior and youth results are cited here and here respectively.

=== Medal table ===
* Host nation (South Africa)

Rank	Nation	Gold	Silver	Bronze	Total
1	India	6	5	2	13
2	Nigeria	5	2	0	7
3	Sri Lanka	2	1	1	4
4	Scotland	1	1	0	2
5	Papua New Guinea	1	0	0	1
6	Seychelles	0	2	1	3
7	South Africa*	0	1	3	4
8	England	0	1	1	2
9	New Zealand	0	1	0	1
10	Wales	0	0	2	2
11	Barbados	0	0	1	1
11	Nauru	0	0	1	1
11	Tuvalu	0	0	1	1
Totals (13 entries)		15	14	13	42

=== Men ===
Event	Gold		Silver		Bronze	
56 kg	Sangeeth Wijesuriya; Sri Lanka	236 kg	Kamal Bandara; Sri Lanka	227 kg	Elson Brechtefeld; Nauru	218 kg
62 kg	Rustam Sarang; India	268 kg	Yukar Sibi; India	264 kg	Ioane Haumili; Tuvalu	226 kg
69 kg	Sudesh Peiris; Sri Lanka	280 kg	Pasam Rambabu; India	271 kg	Gareth Evans; Wales	266 kg
77 kg	Felix Ekpo; Nigeria	311 kg	Gaurav Dubey; India	297 kg	Jack Oliver; England	297 kg
85 kg	Steven Kari; Papua New Guinea	314 kg	Sonny Webster; England	288 kg	Brandon Inniss; Barbados	280 kg
94 kg	Benedict Uloko; Nigeria	344 kg	Peter Kirkbride; Scotland	325 kg	Jean Greeff; South Africa	295 kg
105 kg	Chandrakant Dadu Mali; India	338 kg	Elvis Jeanne; Seychelles	277 kg	M. Rajapaksha; Sri Lanka	277 kg
+105 kg	Sandeep Kumar; India	338 kg	Rupinder Singh; India	337 kg	Darius Jokarzadeh; Wales	286 kg

=== Women ===
Event	Gold		Silver		Bronze	
48 kg	Ngangbam Soniya Chanu; India	174 kg	Augustina Nkem Nwaokolo; Nigeria	172 kg	Katsia Thelemaque; Seychelles	144 kg
53 kg	Hidam Shaya; India	167 kg	Portia Vries; South Africa	155 kg	Kavita Kumari; India	153 kg
58 kg	Racheal Ekoshoria; Nigeria	194 kg	Onyeka Azike; Nigeria	187 kg	Maibam Sunibala Devi; India	181 kg
63 kg	Obioma Okoli; Nigeria	217 kg	Hijam Poireinganbi Chanu; India	178 kg	Matshidiso Masiu; South Africa	153 kg
69 kg	Monika Devi; India	213 kg	Janet Georges; Seychelles	206 kg	Mona Pretorius; South Africa	180 kg
75 kg	Georgina Black; Scotland	165 kg	Not awarded (lack of entries)			
+75 kg	Mariam Usman; Nigeria	267 kg	Chantal Lambrech; New Zealand	179 kg	Not awarded (lack of entries)	
