= Sri Lanka at the 2026 Commonwealth Games =

- Flag of Sri Lanka
- CG code: SRI
- CGA: National Olympic Committee of Sri Lanka
- Website: olympic.lk

in Glasgow, Scotland 23 July 2026 – 2 August 2026
- Competitors: 40 in 6 sports
- Flag bearer (opening): Palitha Bandara
- Baton bearer: Janani Dhananjana
- Flag bearer (closing): Rumesh Tharanga
- Medals Ranked =17th: Gold 1 Silver 1 Bronze 0 Total 2

Commonwealth Games appearances (overview)
- 1938; 1950; 1954; 1958; 1962; 1966; 1970; 1974; 1978; 1982; 1986; 1990; 1994; 1998; 2002; 2006; 2010; 2014; 2018; 2022; 2026; 2030

Sri Lanka competed at the 2026 Commonwealth Games in Glasgow, Scotland. This marked Sri Lanka's 18th participation at the games, after making its debut at the 1938 Commonwealth Games.

The Sri Lankan team consisted of 40 athletes (27 men and 13 women) competing in six sports. The list of participating athletes was officially named on July 17, 2026. The team's chef de mission was retired Sri Lankan badminton athlete Niluka Karunaratne.

Para-athlete Palitha Bandara was the country's flagbearer during the opening ceremony. Meanwhile, fellow para athlete Janani Dhananjana was the baton bearer during the opening ceremony.

Sri Lanka finished the games with two medals, a gold and a silver won in athletics. This meant Sri Lanka finished tied for 17th on the medal table. Gold medalist javelin thrower Rumesh Tharanga served as the country's closing ceremony flagbearer. The gold medal was Sri Lanka's first at the Commonwealth Games in 20 years.

== Competitors ==
The following is the list of number of competitors participating at the Games per sport/discipline.

Sport		Men	Women	Total
Artistic gymnastics		1	2	3
Athletics	Athletics	15	5	20
Athletics	Para-athletics	1	1	2
Boxing		4	2	6
Judo		2	0	2
Swimming		1	1	2
Weightlifting		3	2	5
Total		27	13	40

== Medalists ==
The following Sri Lankan competitors won medals at the games. In the by discipline sections below, medallists' names are bolded.

Medal	Name	Sport	Event	Date	Ref.
Gold	Rumesh Tharanga	Athletics	Men's javelin throw	31 July	
Silver	Palitha Bandara	Para athletics	Men's discus throw (F44)	29 July	

== Artistic gymnastics ==
Sri Lanka entered three artistic gymnasts, one male and two female. Gymnast Tiana Sumanasekera competed for Sri Lanka for the first time after switching her sporting nationality to Sri Lanka from the United States.

Men
Individual Qualification

Athlete	Event	Apparatus						Total	Rank
Athlete	Event	FL	PH	SR	VT	PB	HB	Total	Rank
Nadila Nethviru	All-around	11.400	11.200	—N/a					

Women
Individual Qualification

Athlete	Event	Apparatus				Total	Rank
Athlete	Event	VT	UB	BB	FL	Total	Rank
Tiana Sumanasekera	All-around	—N/a		11.050	—N/a	—N/a	
Nuyara Fernando	All-around	10.600	9.750	8.600	9.350	38.300	35

== Athletics ==
Sri Lanka entered 20 track and field athletes, 15 men and five women. Araliya Sathsarani was named to the team as part of the mixed 4x400 relay team but did not compete. Kalhara Silva also did not compete. Rumesh Tharanga won the gold medal in the men's javelin throw, becoming Sri Lanka's first gold medalist in athletics since 1950. Meanwhile, Palitha Bandara won a silver medal for the second consecutive games.

Key

Ranks given for track events are within the entire round.

- **Q** = Qualified for the next round
- **q** = Qualified for the next round as a fastest loser or, in field events, by position without achieving the qualifying target
- NM = athlete failed to record a valid height, distance, or score in a field event

Track events
Men

Athlete	Event	Round one		Semifinal		Final	
Athlete	Event	Result	Rank	Result	Rank	Result	Rank
Dinet Weeraratna	100 m	10.33	22	Did not advance			
Chamod Yodhasinghe	100 m	10.45	32	Did not advance			
Malith Thamel	200 m	20.99	25	Did not advance			
Aruna Darshana	200 m	20.96	22	Did not advance			
Kalinga Kumarage	400 m	46.28	11 **q**	46.80	20	Did not advance	
Harsha Karunarathna	800 m	1:49.98	21	Did not advance			
Roshan Ranatunga	110 m hurdles	14.11	8 **q**	—		14.05	7
Ayomal Akalanka	400 m hurdles	50.27	11	Did not advance			
Asitha Rathnasen	400 m hurdles	53.04	19	Did not advance			

Mixed

Athlete	Event	Heats		Final	
Athlete	Event	Result	Rank	Result	Rank
Ayomal Akalanka; Aruna Dharshana; Lakshima Mendis; Jithma Wijethunga	4 × 400 m relay	3:22.42	9	Did not advance	

Field events

Athlete	Event	Qualification		Final	
Athlete	Event	Distance	Rank	Distance	Rank
Tharindu Dasun	Men's high jump	—N/a		NM	
Arunthavarasa Puvitharan	Men's pole vault	—N/a		NM	
Yeshan Kumara	Men's triple jump	15.67	8 **q**	16.01	6
**Rumesh Tharanga**	Men's javelin throw	82.84	1 **q**	89.75	1st place, gold medalist(s)
Sumedha Ranasinghe	Men's javelin throw	NM		Did not advance	
Madushani Herath	Women's long jump	6.01	16	Did not advance	
Madushani Herath	Women's triple jump	—N/a		13.22	6
Dilhani Lekamge	Women's javelin throw	—N/a		55.00	7

=== Para athletics ===
Sri Lanka entered two para athletes, one per gender.

Track event

Athlete	Event	Final	
Athlete	Event	Result	Rank
Janani Dhananjana	Women's 100 metres (T47)	12.50 PB	4

Field event

Athlete	Event	Final	
Athlete	Event	Distance	Rank
**Palitha Bandara**	Men's discus throw (F44)	46.84	2nd place, silver medalist(s)

== Boxing ==
Sri Lanka entered six boxers (four men and two women).

Athlete	Event	Preliminaries	Preliminaries	Quarterfinal	Semifinal	Final	
Athlete	Event	Opposition Result	Opposition Result	Opposition Result	Opposition Result	Opposition Result	Rank
Rukmal Prasanna	Men's 55 kg	Bye	Trowbridge (ENG); **L** 0–4	Did not advance			
Ravindu Jayantha	Men's 60 kg	Makana (SOL); **W** 5–0	Adams (GUE); **L** 1–4	Did not advance			
Chamil Pathmasiri	Men's 65 kg	Katema (ZAM); **L** KO	Did not advance				
Sithija Sudamma	Men's 80 kg	Ofori (CAN); **L** RSC	Did not advance				
Nadeeka Pushpakumari	Women's 51 kg	—N/a	Neely (SCO); **W** 3–2	Aeres (NAM); **L** 0–4	Did not advance		
Keshani Hansika	Women's 57 kg	—N/a	Bye	Daunakamakama (FIJ); **L** 1–4	Did not advance		

== Judo ==
Sri Lanka entered two male judoka.

Men

Athlete	Event	Preliminaries	Round of 16	Quarterfinal	Semifinal	Repechage	Final / BM	
Athlete	Event	Opposition Result	Opposition Result	Opposition Result	Opposition Result	Opposition Result	Opposition Result	Rank
Wimukthi Premarathna	60 kg	—N/a	Wali (KEN); **L** 2–3s1	Did not advance				
Chamara Repiyallage	73 kg	Kapungwe (ZAM); **W** 11s2–10	Moore (WAL); **L** 0s1–101	Did not advance				

== Swimming ==
Sri Lanka evented two swimmers, one of each gender. Originally Kyle Abeysinghe was supposed to represent the country, but was replaced with Muhammad Fidhyan Mohamed due to the former contracting an illness before the games.

Athlete	Event	Heat		Semifinal		Final	
Athlete	Event	Time	Rank	Time	Rank	Time	Rank
Muhammad Fidhyan Mohamed	Men's 50 m freestyle	24.17	39	Did not advance			
Muhammad Fidhyan Mohamed	Men's 100 m freestyle	53.00	43	Did not advance			
Muhammad Fidhyan Mohamed	Men's 50 m butterfly	25.25	37	Did not advance			
Minagi Rupesinghe	Women's 100 m freestyle	1:00.31	35	Did not advance			
Minagi Rupesinghe	Women's 100 m backstroke	1:06.52	25	Did not advance			
Minagi Rupesinghe	Women's 200 m backstroke	2:22.14	13	—N/a		Did not advance	

== Weightlifting ==
Sri Lanka qualified four weightlifters (three men and one woman). The country later received an additional women's quota, for a total of five weightlifters (three men and two women).

Athlete	Event	Snatch (kg)		Clean & Jerk (kg)		Total (kg)	Rank
Athlete	Event	Result	Rank	Result	Rank	Total (kg)	Rank
Supun Somathilaka	Men's 60 kg	109	4	135	4	244	4
Sandu Jayawardena	Men's 65 kg	124	4	151	5	275	5
Indika Dissanayake	Men's 71 kg	NM		DNF			
Upamalika Gunahilaka	Women's 48 kg	NM		DNF			
Chathurika Balage	Women's 86 kg	80	10	107	9	187	9

== See also ==
- Sri Lanka at the 2026 Asian Beach Games
- Sri Lanka at the 2026 Asian Games
