= Weightlifting at the 2014 Commonwealth Games – Men's 62 kg =

Weightlifting – Men's 62 kg at the 2014 Commonwealth Games
- Venue: Clyde Auditorium
- Dates: 25 July 2014
- Competitors: 20 from 19 nations
- Winning total weight: 276 kg

Medalists
gold medal	Dimitris Minasidis	Cyprus
silver medal	Sudesh Peiris	Sri Lanka
bronze medal	Vaipava Ioane	Samoa

The Men's 62 kg weightlifting event at the 2014 Commonwealth Games in Glasgow, Scotland, took place at the Scottish Exhibition and Conference Centre on 25 July. The weightlifter from Cyprus won the gold, with a combined lift of 276 kg.

== Result ==
The final results:

Rank	Athlete	Snatch (kg)				Clean & Jerk (kg)				Total
Rank	Athlete	1	2	3	Result	1	2	3	Result	Total
1st place, gold medalist(s)	Dimitris Minasidis (CYP)	120	125	~~128~~	125	~~151~~	151	~~155~~	151	276
2nd place, silver medalist(s)	Sudesh Peiris (SRI)	105	~~123~~	123	123	~~150~~	~~150~~	150	150	273
3rd place, bronze medalist(s)	Vaipava Ioane (SAM)	115	~~118~~	~~118~~	115	~~156~~	156	~~160~~	156	271
4	Morea Baru (PNG)	115	~~120~~	120	120	~~149~~	~~149~~	150	150	270
5	Gareth Evans (WAL)	118	~~120~~	~~120~~	118	~~147~~	147	150	150	268
6	Constantine Clement (MAS)	120	~~126~~	~~126~~	120	146	~~151~~	~~151~~	146	266
7	Rustam Sarang (IND)	~~113~~	113	118	118	~~145~~	145	~~151~~	145	263
8	Daniel Koum (CMR)	112	~~115~~	~~117~~	112	140	~~145~~	145	145	257
9	Vannara Be (AUS)	110	114	116	116	140	~~145~~	~~145~~	140	256
10	Charles Ssekyaaya (UGA)	108	113	~~117~~	113	~~142~~	142	~~145~~	142	255
11	Jaswant Shergill (ENG)	105	110	~~112~~	110	136	140	~~142~~	140	250
12	Ianne Guiñares (NZL)	109	~~113~~	~~113~~	109	~~137~~	137	~~143~~	137	246
13	Elson Brechtefeld (NRU)	~~105~~	105	~~109~~	105	135	141	~~145~~	141	246
14	King Kalu (NGR)	105	~~110~~	~~110~~	105	140	~~145~~	~~145~~	140	245
15	Brown Ramohaka (SOL)	95	100	~~105~~	100	~~130~~	~~135~~	135	135	235
16	Rick Confiance (SEY)	~~100~~	100	106	106	125	~~130~~	~~130~~	125	231
17	Daniel Darko (GHA)	83	86	89	89	104	108	~~111~~	108	197
–	Indika Dissanayake (SRI)	~~120~~	~~120~~	120	120	~~149~~	~~149~~	~~153~~	–	–
–	Greg Shushu (RSA)	~~115~~	~~115~~	~~115~~	–	Did not finish				
–	Lapua Lapua (TUV)	~~116~~	~~116~~	~~116~~	–	Did not finish				
