= Weightlifting at the 2018 Commonwealth Games =

- Venue: Carrara Sports and Leisure Centre
- Location: Gold Coast, Australia
- Dates: 5 to 9 April 2018
- Competitors: 206 from 35 nations

Weightlifting at the 2018 Commonwealth Games was the 18th appearance of Weightlifting at the Commonwealth Games. The weightlifting competition was held in the Gold Coast, Australia, from April 5 to 9. The events were held at the Carrara Sports and Leisure Centre. A total of eight men's and eight women's events were held.

On 7 October 2016, it was announced that seven new events for women were being added to the sport program, meaning there would be an equal number of events for men and women. This marked the first time in history that a major multi-sport event would have equality in terms of events. This included the addition of an additional female event in the weightlifting competitions.

== Competition schedule ==
The following is the competition schedule for the weightlifting competitions:

Date	Time	Event
Thursday, 5 April	09:30	Men's 56 kg
Thursday, 5 April	14:00	Women's 48 kg
Thursday, 5 April	18:30	Men's 62 kg
Friday, 6 April	09:30	Women's 53 kg
Friday, 6 April	14:00	Men's 69 kg
Friday, 6 April	18:30	Women's 58 kg
Saturday, 7 April	09:30	Men's 77 kg
Saturday, 7 April	14:00	Women's 63 kg
Saturday, 7 April	18:30	Men's 85 kg
Sunday, 8 April	09:30	Women's 69 kg
Sunday, 8 April	14:00	Men's 94 kg
Sunday, 8 April	18:30	Women's 75 kg
Monday, 9 April	09:30	Men's 105 kg
Monday, 9 April	16:00	Women's 90 kg
Monday, 9 April	16:00	Women's +90 kg
Monday, 9 April	18:30	Men's +105 kg

== Medal table ==
* Host nation (Australia)

Rank	Nation	Gold	Silver	Bronze	Total
1	India	5	2	2	9
2	Samoa	2	2	0	4
3	Malaysia	2	0	1	3
4	England	1	3	2	6
5	Canada	1	3	1	5
6	Papua New Guinea	1	2	0	3
7	Australia*	1	1	1	3
8	Fiji	1	0	1	2
8	Wales	1	0	1	2
10	New Zealand	1	0	0	1
11	Sri Lanka	0	1	2	3
12	Mauritius	0	1	0	1
12	Nauru	0	1	0	1
14	Pakistan	0	0	2	2
15	Cameroon	0	0	1	1
15	Solomon Islands	0	0	1	1
15	South Africa	0	0	1	1
Totals (17 entries)		16	16	16	48

== Medalists ==
=== Men's events ===
Event	Gold		Silver		Bronze	
56 kg	Azroy Hazalwafie; Malaysia	261 kg GR	Gururaja Poojary; India	249 kg	Chaturanga Lakmal; Sri Lanka	248 kg
62 kg	Aznil Bidin; Malaysia	288 kg	Morea Baru; Papua New Guinea	286 kg	Talha Talib; Pakistan	283 kg
69 kg	Gareth Evans; Wales	299 kg	Indika Dissanayake; Sri Lanka	297 kg	Deepak Lather; India	295 kg
77 kg	Sathish Sivalingam; India	317 kg	Jack Oliver; England	312 kg	François Etoundi; Australia	305 kg
85 kg	Ragala Venkat Rahul; India	338 kg	Don Opeloge; Samoa	331 kg	Mohamad Fazrul Azrie; Malaysia	328 kg
94 kg	Steven Kari; Papua New Guinea	370 kg CR / GR	Boady Santavy; Canada	369 kg	Vikas Thakur; India	351 kg
105 kg	Sanele Mao; Samoa	360 kg	Pardeep Singh; India	352 kg	Owen Boxall; England	351 kg
+105 kg	David Liti; New Zealand	403 kg GR	Lauititi Lui; Samoa	400 kg	Muhammad Butt; Pakistan	395 kg

=== Women's events ===
Event	Gold		Silver		Bronze	
48 kg	Saikhom Mirabai Chanu; India	196 kg CR /GR	Roilya Ranaivosoa; Mauritius	170 kg	Dinusha Gomes; Sri Lanka	155 kg
53 kg	Khumukcham Sanjita Chanu; India	192 kg GR	Dika Toua; Papua New Guinea	182 kg	Rachel Leblanc-Bazinet; Canada	181 kg
58 kg	Tia-Clair Toomey; Australia	201 kg	Tali Darsigny; Canada	200 kg	Jenly Tegu Wini; Solomon Islands	189 kg
63 kg	Maude Charron; Canada	220 kg GR	Zoe Smith; England	207 kg	Mona Pretorius; South Africa	206 kg
69 kg	Punam Yadav; India	222 kg	Sarah Davies; England	217 kg	Apolonia Vaivai; Fiji	216 kg
75 kg	Emily Godley; England	222 kg	Marie-Ève Beauchemin-Nadeau; Canada	221 kg	Laura Hughes; Wales	207 kg
90 kg	Eileen Cikamatana; Fiji	233 kg	Kaity Fassina; Australia	232 kg	Clementine Meukeugni; Cameroon	226 kg
+90 kg	Feagaiga Stowers; Samoa	253 kg	Charisma Amoe-Tarrant; Nauru	243 kg	Emily Campbell; England	242 kg

== Records ==
=== Men's ===
Event	Date	Round	Name	Nationality	Weight	Record
Men's 56 kg	5 April	Snatch	Azroy Hazalwafie	Malaysia	117 kg	GR
Men's 56 kg	5 April	Total	Azroy Hazalwafie	Malaysia	261 kg	GR
Men's 62 kg	5 April	Snatch	Talha Talib	Pakistan	132 kg	GR
Men's 94 kg	8 April	Snatch	Boady Santavy	Canada	168 kg	GR
Men's 94 kg	8 April	Clean & Jerk	Steven Kari	Papua New Guinea	216 kg	CR, GR
Men's +105 kg	9 April	Total	David Liti	New Zealand	403 kg	CR, GR

=== Women's ===
Event	Date	Round	Name	Nationality	Weight	Record
Women's 48 kg	5 April	Snatch	Saikhom Mirabai Chanu	India	86 kg	CR, GR
Women's 48 kg	5 April	Clean & Jerk	Saikhom Mirabai Chanu	India	110 kg	CR, GR
Women's 48 kg	5 April	Total	Saikhom Mirabai Chanu	India	196 kg	CR, GR
Women's 53 kg	6 April	Snatch	Khumukcham Sanjita Chanu	India	84 kg	GR
Women's 63 kg	7 April	Clean & Jerk	Maude Charron	Canada	122 kg	GR

- Broken Records in Weightlifting

== Qualification ==
For the first time, weightlifting athletes had to qualify for the Games. A total of 226 weightlifters (120 male and 106 women) will qualify to compete at the games. Qualification was done through multiple pathways.

== Participating nations ==
There are 35 participating associations in weightlifting with a total of 206 athletes. The number of athletes a nation entered is in parentheses beside the name of the country.

- Australia (16)
- Bangladesh (5)
- Barbados (2)
- Botswana (1)
- Canada (11)
- Cameroon (5)
- Cook Islands (2)
- England (12)
- Fiji (7)
- Ghana (4)
- India (16)
- Kenya (5)
- Kiribati (5)
- Lesotho (1)
- Malaysia (10)
- Malta (1)
- Mauritius (10)
- Nigeria (4)
- Northern Ireland (5)
- Nauru (10)
- New Zealand (12)
- Pakistan (5)
- Papua New Guinea (6)
- Saint Vincent and the Grenadines (1)
- Samoa (6)
- Scotland (4)
- Seychelles (3)
- Singapore (1)
- Solomon Islands (3)
- Sri Lanka (11)
- South Africa (3)
- Tonga (1)
- Tuvalu (1)
- Uganda (4)
- Wales (13)
