= F6 =

F6, F06, F 6, F.6 or F-6 may refer to:

== Science and technology ==
- 246 (number), in hexadecimal
- Nikon F6, an SLR 35mm camera
- F06, an ICD-10 mental and behavioural disorder code
- F6, a function key on a computer keyboard
- F6, a theoretical level on the Fujita scale of tornado strength
- Force 6, a level on the Beaufort scale of windspeed
- F6, the octave name for the F (musical note) at a frequency of 1396.913 Hz.

== Transport and vehicles ==
=== Air ===
- Caproni Vizzola F.6, an Italian prototype fighter of 1941 (F.6M) and 1943 (F.6Z)
- F-6 Mustang, a reconnaissance variant of the North American P-51 Mustang World War II fighter
- F-6 Skyray, originally Douglas F4D Skyray, a 1950s/1960s US Navy jet fighter
- FaroeJet (IATA code)
- Grumman F6F Hellcat, an American World War II fighter aircraft
- Hannover F.6, civil configuration of the Hannover CL.V, a 1918 German ground attack aircraft
- Hunter F.6, a 1954 production variant of the Hawker Hunter fighter aircraft
- Shenyang F-6, an export version of the Chinese Shenyang J-6 jet fighter
- System F6, a DARPA program on developing fractionated spacecraft
- Västgöta Wing, or F 6, a former Swedish Air Force wing

=== Automotive ===
- BYD F6, a Chinese-made midsize sedan
- FPV F6, an Australian-made series of cars by Ford Performance Vehicles
- Princes Motorway, or F6, a motorway between Sydney and Wollongong, New South Wales, Australia
- F-6, a version of the 1948-1952 Ford F-Series pickup trucks
- A Flat-6 engine used in cars

=== Other ===
- Italian submarine F6, an Italian Regia Marina (Royal Navy) submarine in commission from 1917 to 1935
- Milwaukee Road class F6, a 1925 American 4-6-4 steam locomotive model
- Mosman Bay ferry service (F6), a commuter ferry route in Sydney, New South Wales, Australia
- LNER Class F6, a class of British steam locomotives
  - This may also refer to LNER Class F5 No.789 and 790, who were incorrectly classified F6 by the LNER

== Other uses ==
- f6 (cigarette), a German brand
- F6 (classification), a wheelchair sport classification
- F-6, Islamabad, a sector of Islamabad, Pakistan

== See also ==
- 6F (disambiguation)
