= Weightlifting at the 2014 Commonwealth Games – Men's 69 kg =

Weightlifting – Men's 69 kg at the 2014 Commonwealth Games
- Venue: Clyde Auditorium
- Dates: 26 July 2014
- Competitors: 19 from 14 nations
- Winning total weight: 305 kg

Medalists
gold medal	Mohd Hafifi Mansor	Malaysia
silver medal	Yinka Ayenuwa	Nigeria
bronze medal	Omkar Otari	India

The Men's 69 kg weightlifting event at the 2014 Commonwealth Games in Glasgow, Scotland, took place at Scottish Exhibition and Conference Centre on 26 July. The weightlifter from Malaysia won the gold, with a combined lift of 305 kg.

== Result ==
Rank	Athlete	Snatch (kg)				Clean & Jerk (kg)				Total	Notes
Rank	Athlete	1	2	3	Result	1	2	3	Result	Total	Notes
1st place, gold medalist(s)	Mohd Hafifi Mansor (MAS)	135	~~137~~	~~137~~	135	166	~~170~~	170	170	305	
2nd place, silver medalist(s)	Yinka Ayenuwa (NGR)	125	~~130~~	130	130	161	166	171	171	301	
3rd place, bronze medalist(s)	Omkar Otari (IND)	136	134	136	136	155	162	~~166~~	162	298	
4	Francis Luna-Grenier (CAN)	127	130	~~133~~	130	~~161~~	162	~~167~~	162	292	
5	Mohammad Huzairi Ramli (MAS)	127	~~132~~	~~132~~	127	155	163	~~166~~	163	290	
6	Mark Spooner (NZL)	126	~~130~~	~~130~~	126	157	162	~~171~~	162	288	
7	Njuh Venatius (CMR)	120	125	~~128~~	125	~~160~~	~~160~~	160	160	285	
8	Christopher Freebury (ENG)	120	125	130	130	150	~~154~~	~~154~~	150	280	
9	Joseph Ekani Belinga (CMR)	120	125	130	130	145	150	~~153~~	150	280	
10	Cody Cole (NZL)	122	~~126~~	~~126~~	122	146	150	~~158~~	150	272	
11	Takenibeia Toromon (KIR)	110	115	~~120~~	115	140	145	~~150~~	145	260	
12	Hamidul Islam (BAN)	~~110~~	~~110~~	110	110	140	145	~~150~~	145	255	
13	Nicolas Vachon (CAN)	110	~~114~~	~~114~~	110	135	~~140~~	140	140	250	
14	Abu Sufyan (PAK)	108	~~113~~	~~113~~	108	~~137~~	~~137~~	137	137	245	
15	Penisimani Siolaa (TON)	90	~~95~~	~~95~~	90	120	~~125~~	~~125~~	120	210	
16	John Phiri (MAW)	~~73~~	75	80	80	100	105	107	107	187	
-	Shaun Clegg (ENG)	124	~~128~~	~~128~~	124	~~155~~	~~155~~	~~155~~	-	-	
-	Chintana Vindanage (SRI)	~~127~~	~~127~~	~~127~~	-	-	-	-	-	-	DNF
-	Chris Randigimi (NRU)	~~93~~	~~93~~	~~93~~	-	-	-	-	-	-	DNF
