= Athletics at the 2026 Commonwealth Games – Men's discus throw (F44) =

Men's discus throw (F44) at the 2026 Commonwealth Games
- Venue: Scotstoun Stadium
- Dates: 29 July
- Winning points: 1020

Medalists
gold medal	Aled Davies	Wales
silver medal	Palitha Bandara	Sri Lanka
bronze medal	Akeem Stewart	Trinidad and Tobago

The men's discus throw (F44) at the 2026 Commonwealth Games, as part of the athletics programme, took place in the Scotstoun Stadium on 29 July 2026.

The event is open to athletes from a range of classifications - F42, F43, F44, F62, F63 and F64. As a cross classification event, the results will be determined by points earned within each classification.

The event will consist of a stand alone final on the evening session of 29 July. The reigning champion, Aled Davies of Wales, returned to successfully defend his title.

== Schedule ==
The schedule is as follows:

Date	Time	Round
29 July 2026	20:45	Final

All times are British Summer Time (UTC+1)

== Records ==
Prior to this competition, the existing world and Games records in relevant classifications were as follows:

Men's Discus Throw F44
World record	64.26	Blair David (USA)	Tucson, United States	20 May 2021
Men's Discus Throw F46
World record	52.94	Kaurin Erik Fabian (CRO)	Pula, Croatia	6 June 2026
Men's Discus Throw F62
World record	29.86	Sevdikalis Ioannis (GRE)	Thessaloniki Greece	3 June 2024
Men's Discus Throw F64
World record	65.86	Campbell Jeremy (USA)	Tucson, United States	30 May 2021

== Qualification ==
Para athletic event qualification is regulated by a special system organised between Commonwealth Sport and the International Paralympic Committee. Each para athletic event allowed for eight quota places, or 10 in the case of throwing events. All but one quota in each event was available on the basis of the Commonwealth Para Rankings on 31 Match 2026, to a maximum of two per Commonwealth Games Association (CGA), with the remaining quota allocated by Bipartite invitation.

This list did not set a limit on entrants, as other athletes in the same classification, but qualified directly for another event, could enter the event in question, up to a maximum (combined quota, invitation and 'separate event' quota) of three per event per CGA.

== Results ==
=== Final ===
Rank	Name	Sport class	#1	#2	#3	#4	#5	#6	Result	Points	Notes
(gold)	Aled Davies (WAL)	F42	39.47	x	48.38	45.15	x	x	48.38	1020	
(silver)	Palitha Bandara (SRI)	F42	46.84	32.53	42.83	44.05	40.51	44.95	46.84	992	PB
(bronze)	Akeem Stewart (TTO)	F43	x	56.59	x	x	56.82	54.37	56.82	941	SB
4	Dan Greaves (ENG)	F44	50.08	54.83	x	53.27	x	x	54.83	903	GR, SB
5	Harrison Walsh (WAL)	F64	53.68	53.53	54.33	x	x	52.58	54.33	892	SB
6	Sagar Thayat (IND)	F43	46.35	51.79	x	48.67	x	49.38	51.79	834	AR, SB
7	Devender Kumar (IND)	F44	43.51	x	46.40	x	48.20	45.75	48.20	739	SB
8	Michal Burian (AUS)	F44	25.70	32.53	44.24	39.60	43.73	40.13	44.24	616	SB
9	Sitiveni Konataci (FIJ)	F42	27.54	25.87	25.71				27.54	302	SB
10	Nickel Walters (GRN)	F44	25.78	24.72	25.51				25.78	63	PB
