= Vanua =

Austronesian cultural concept

The word banua or vanua (the latter from Fijian, as well as various languages of Melanesia, see below) – meaning 'land', 'home', or 'village' – occurs in several Austronesian languages. It descends from the Proto-Austronesian reconstructed form *banua. The word has particular significance in several countries.

== Western Malayo-Polynesian languages ==
=== Philippines ===
Kapampangan

In the Kapampangan language, banwa or banua means "sky" or "year".

Visayan

In the Hiligaynon Visayan language, banwa means "people", "nation" or "country."

=== Malaysia and Indonesia ===
Malay

In the Malay language (the lingua franca of both Malaysia and Indonesia), benua means "landmass" or "continent". The word for "land" in these languages and nearby Austronesian languages — e.g., in Tana Toraja, Tana Tidung or Tanö Niha – are tanah or tana.

Banjar

In the Banjar language, banua means "village" or "homeland".

Old Javanese

In the Old Javanese language, wanwa or wanua means "village", "inhabited place" or "settlement".

Buginese

In the Buginese language, banua means "village", "country", "land" or "homeland".

Toraja

In the Toraja language, banua means "home".

Old Sundanese

In the Old Sundanese language, banua or wano means "area" or "place".

Minahasa

In all Minahasan languages, wanua means "village", "country", or "land". The word Kawanua means land of the Minahasan people.

Dayak

In Iban (used by the Dayak people), menua or menoa means "place", "country", "land" or "homeland". In many other Dayak languages, the word has the form binua.

=== Palau ===
In Palauan, which is a non-Oceanic Austronesian language, beluu means "village" or "country", as can be seen in the native name of the country, Beluu er a Belau.

== Melanesian languages ==
In some Oceanic languages of Melanesia, the root *banua has sometimes become vanua, via Proto-Oceanic *panua.

=== In Papua New Guinea ===
In Motu, the word hanua means "village". The name of a village near Port Moresby is called Hanuabada, meaning "big village". In Uneapa, the word vanua means "island".

=== In Vanuatu ===
In Vanuatu, vanua also means "land", "island" or "home." The name of the Vanua'aku Pati literally means "The party of My Land". Hence also the name of Vanuatu itself, and the place name Vanua Lava (literally ‘big island’ in Mota language).

Lo-Toga

In the Lo-Toga language, the word venie means "village", "island" or "country".

Mwotlap

In Mwotlap, the word vōnō means "village", "district", "island" or "country".

=== In Fiji ===
In Fijian and Fiji English, vanua is an essential concept of indigenous Fijian culture and society. It is generally translated in English as "land", but vanua as a concept encompasses a number of interrelated meanings. When speaking English, Fijians may use the word vanua rather than an imprecise English equivalent. According to Fijian academic Asesela Ravuvu, a correct translation would be "land, people and custom". Vanua means "the land area one is identified with", but also

"the people, their traditions and customs, beliefs and values, and the various other institutions established for the sake of achieving harmony, solidarity and prosperity within a particular social context. [...] It provides a sense of identity and belonging. [...] The vanua [...] is an extension of the concept of the self."

An indigenous Fijian person is thus defined through his or her land; the concepts of personhood and land ownership are viewed as inseparable. This is also the case for other indigenous peoples of Oceania, such as Australian Aboriginals (see: Dreaming) and New Zealand Māori (see: iwi).

A vanua is also a confederation of several yavusa ("clans" established through descent from a common ancestor). A vanua in this sense is associated with its ownership of an area of vanua in the sense of "land"; the various meanings of vanua are, here too, interrelated.

The word vanua is found in the place names Vanua Levu and Vanua Balavu.

Indigenous land ownership is a key issue in conservative and indigenous nationalistic Fijian politics. Several right-wing, essentially indigenous parties refer to vanua in their names:

- Nationalist Vanua Tako Lavo Party
- Soqosoqo Duavata ni Lewenivanua

== Polynesian languages ==
Māori

In Māori language, whenua means homeland or country. The Māori people also call themselves Tāngata whenua, or people of the land.

The word whenua also means "placenta". Per Te Ara: The Encyclopedia of New Zealand, "[a]ll life is seen as being born from the womb of Papatūānuku, under the sea. The lands that appear above water are placentas from her womb". By extension, tangata whenua refers to Maoris' "deep relationship with [their particular tribal land], through their births and their ancestors’ births. [...] This idea, in turn, underpins the notion of mana whenua – spiritual authority in a given area". Te Aka similarly defines tangara whenua as "local people, hosts, indigenous people - people born of the whenua, i.e. of the placenta and of the land where the people's ancestors have lived and where their placenta are buried".

Tongan

In Tongan, fonua means land or country.

Sione Tu’itahi defines fonua as "the Tongan concept of humans being one with the environment". As in Maori, fonua means both "placenta" and "land"; hence "the baby is sustained by her fonua, the placenta. The baby is later born into the fonua (land), where she experiences life and builds relationships with the fonua – the entire ecology, including its human inhabitants. As part of the birth process, the remains of the fonua (placenta) that sustained the baby are returned by burial to the fonua (physical land)".

Samoan

In Samoan, fanua means land.

Rapa Nui

In the Rapanui language, henua means land or earth.

Hawaiian

In Hawaiian honua means land, earth, or foundation, and is usually used in the more literal sense. Land in the more figurative or spiritual sense is usually represented by the word ʻāina, and locally-born people are referred to as kamaʻāina (child of the land).

Other Polynesian languages

Elsewhere, the form of the word is generally fenua.

== See also ==
- Austronesian languages
- Austronesian peoples
- Cultural identity
- Culture of Fiji
