= Dinusha =

Dinusha is both a given name and a surname. Notable people with the name include:

- Dinusha Fernando (born 1979), Sri Lankan cricketer
- Dinusha Gomes (born 1992), Sri Lankan weightlifter
- Sonal Dinusha (born 2000), Sri Lankan cricketer
