= 6F =

6F or 6-F can refer to:

- Six Flags amusement parks
- Ford 6F transmission; see GM-Ford 6-speed automatic transmission
- A-6F, a model of Grumman A-6 Intruder
- Grumman F6F Hellcat
- Sucrose 6F-alpha-galactosyltransferase
- Cunningham-Hall Model PT-6F, a model of Cunningham-Hall PT-6
- ER-6f, an alternate name for the Kawasaki Ninja 650R
- 6F, the production code for the 1983 Doctor Who serial Mawdryn Undead
- Primera Air Nordic, a Latvian airline (IATA code 6F, 2014-2018)

== See also ==
- F6 (disambiguation)
