= Fonua =

Fonua is a surname. Notable people with the surname include:

- Amini Fonua (born 1989), Tongan swimmer
- Mahe Fonua (born 1992), Australian rugby league player
- Opeti Fonua (born 1986), Tongan rugby union player
- Semisi Fonua (1911–1968), Tongan noble and politician

== See also ==
- Addin Fonua-Blake (born 1995), Australian rugby league player
- Penisimani Angelo Fonua Siolaa (born 1994), Tongan male weightlifter
