= Mona Pretorius =

South African weightlifter

Personal information
- Nationality: South African
- Born: 12 August 1988 (age 37)

Sport
- Sport: Weightlifting
Medal record
Women's weightlifting
Representing South Africa
Commonwealth Games
| Bronze medal – third place | 2018 Gold Coast | 63 kg |
Commonwealth Championships
| Gold medal – first place | 2016 Penang | 63 kg |
| Silver medal – second place | 2009 Penang | 58 kg |
| Bronze medal – third place | 2011 Cape Town | 69 kg |
African Championships
| Gold medal – first place | 2018 Mahébourg | 69 kg |
| Silver medal – second place | 2009 Kampala | 58 kg |
| Silver medal – second place | 2010 Yaoundé | 58 kg |
| Silver medal – second place | 2011 Cape Town | 69 kg |

Mona Pretorius (born 12 August 1988) is a South African weightlifter. She competed in the women's 63 kg event at the 2018 Commonwealth Games, winning the bronze medal.

She currently has her own Olympic Weightlifting coaching business which can be found on Lift Big Eat Big.
