= Cody Cole =

New Zealand weightlifter

Personal information
- Full name: Cody Cole
- Born: 28 May 1990 (age 36)
- Weight: 68.52 kg (151.1 lb)

Sport
- Country: New Zealand
- Sport: Weightlifting
- Weight class: 69 kg
- Team: National team
- Updated on 19 October 2016

Cody Cole (born 28 May 1990) is a New Zealand male weightlifter, competing in the 69 kg category and representing New Zealand at international competitions. He participated at the 2014 Commonwealth Games in the 69 kg event.

== Major competitions ==
Year	Venue	Weight	Snatch (kg)				Clean & Jerk (kg)				Total	Rank
Year	Venue	Weight	1	2	3	Rank	1	2	3	Rank	Total	Rank
Commonwealth Games
2014	Glasgow, Scotland	69 kg	122	~~126~~	~~126~~	—N/a	146	150	~~158~~	—N/a	272	10
