= Vannara Be =

Australian weightlifter

Personal information
- Nationality: Cambodia; Australia
- Born: 16 February 1988 (age 38) Cambodia
- Home town: Melbourne, Australia
- Weight: 61.53 kg (135.7 lb)

Sport
- Country: Australia
- Sport: Weightlifting
- Weight class: 62 kg
- Team: National team
- Updated on 11 October 2016

Vannara Be (born 16 February 1988) is a Cambodian born Australian male weightlifter, competing in the 62 kg category and representing Australia at international competitions. He participated at the 2010 Commonwealth Games in the 62 kg event. at the 2014 Commonwealth Games in the 62 kg event.

== Personal ==
Her younger sister Socheata Be is also an international weightlifter who competed at the 2014 Commonwealth Games. They settled in Australia around 1998, joining their father Vanthy, who had been sponsored for a work visa by a Yarra Valley vineyard. Their uncle Vantho travelled by boat to Australia as a refugee more than a decade earlier, eventually encouraging their father to make the journey and later his wife Chantha and children. Their father's brother and a sister were killed on the killing fields of their homeland, the latter's death causing so much anguish to Vannara and Socheata's grandmother that she lost the use of one eye.

== Major competitions ==
Year	Venue	Weight	Snatch (kg)				Clean & Jerk (kg)				Total	Rank
Year	Venue	Weight	1	2	3	Rank	1	2	3	Rank	Total	Rank
Commonwealth Games
2014	Glasgow, Scotland	62 kg	110	114	116	—N/a	140	~~145~~	~~145~~	—N/a	256	9
2010	Delhi, India	62 kg	~~110~~	110	116	—N/a	136	142	~~149~~	—N/a	258	8
