= Azroy Hazalwafie =

Malaysian weightlifter (born 1994)

Muhammad Azroy Hazalwafie
Personal information
- Nationality: Malaysian
- Born: 4 April 1994 (age 32) Pahang, Malaysia
- Height: 1.62 m (5 ft 4 in) (2018)
- Weight: 56 kg (123 lb) (2018)

Sport
- Country: Malaysia
- Sport: Weightlifting
- Event: 56 kg
Medal record
Men's weightlifting
Representing Malaysia
Asian Championships
Silver medal – second place	2019 Ningbo	55 kg
Commonwealth Games
Gold medal – first place	2018 Gold Coast	56 kg
Commonwealth Championships
Gold medal – first place	2017 Gold Coast	56 kg
Silver medal – second place	2016 Penang	56 kg
Bronze medal – third place	2015 Pune	56 kg

Muhammad Azroy Hazalwafie Izhar Ahmad (born 4 April 1994), is a Malaysian weightlifter who won the gold medal in the men's 56 kg weight class at the 2018 Commonwealth Games in Gold Coast, Australia.

He broke previous snatch record of 116 kg in New Delhi in 2010 and total of 260 kg in Manchester Games in 2002 set by Amirul Hamizan Ibrahim holding the Games record in snatch with 117 kg before finishing with a total of 261 kg in 2018 Gold Coast Commonwealth Games.
