= Deepak Lather =

Indian weightlifter (born 2000)

Personal information
- Nationality: Indian
- Born: 25 March 2000 (age 26) Shadipur village, Haryana, India
- Height: 1.70 m (5 ft 7 in) (2018)
- Weight: 69 kg (152 lb) (2018)

Sport
- Country: India
- Sport: Weightlifting
- Event: 69 kg
- Partner(s): Reliance, Indian army
Medal record
Men's weightlifting
Representing India
Commonwealth Games
Bronze medal – third place	2018 Gold Coast	69 kg
Commonwealth Championships
Gold medal – first place	2015 Pune	62 kg
Silver medal – second place	2017 Gold Coast	69 kg

Deepak Lather (born 25 March 2000), is an Indian weightlifter who won the bronze medal in the men's 69 kg weight class at the 2018 Commonwealth Games in Gold Coast, Australia. He is pursuing Business, India. He is the youngest person to hold an Indian national record in weightlifting. He is a Naib Subedar in Bombay Sappers in the Indian Army.

== Personal life ==
His father Bijender Lather was a farmer by profession. Deepak used to work with his father's farmland since childhood. That grooms his strength and made him a natural weightlifter. At the age of 16, in National Championship, he broke the national record in Men's 62 kg category. He joined Indian Army through Sports Quota and was initially trained for diving. But after being trained for few months, he was re-trained for weightlifting.
