= Shaun Clegg =

British weightlifter (born 1992)

Personal information
- Full name: Shaun Clegg
- Nationality: United Kingdom (England)
- Born: 13 October 1992 (age 33)
- Weight: 68.52 kg (151.1 lb)

Sport
- Country: England
- Sport: Weightlifting
- Weight class: 69 kg
- Team: National team
- Updated on 19 October 2016

Shaun Clegg (born 13 October 1992) is a British male weightlifter, competing in the 69 kg category. He represented England at the 2014 Commonwealth Games in the 69 kg event.

== Major competitions ==
Year	Venue	Weight	Snatch (kg)				Clean & Jerk (kg)				Total	Rank
Year	Venue	Weight	1	2	3	Rank	1	2	3	Rank	Total	Rank
Representing Great Britain
European Championships
2014	Tel Aviv, Israel	77 kg	~~127~~	127	~~132~~	13	155	160	~~165~~	11	287	12
Representing England
Commonwealth Games
2014	Glasgow, Scotland	69 kg	124	~~128~~	~~128~~	10	~~155~~	~~155~~	~~155~~	—	—	—
