= Gururaja Poojary =

Indian weightlifter (born 1992)

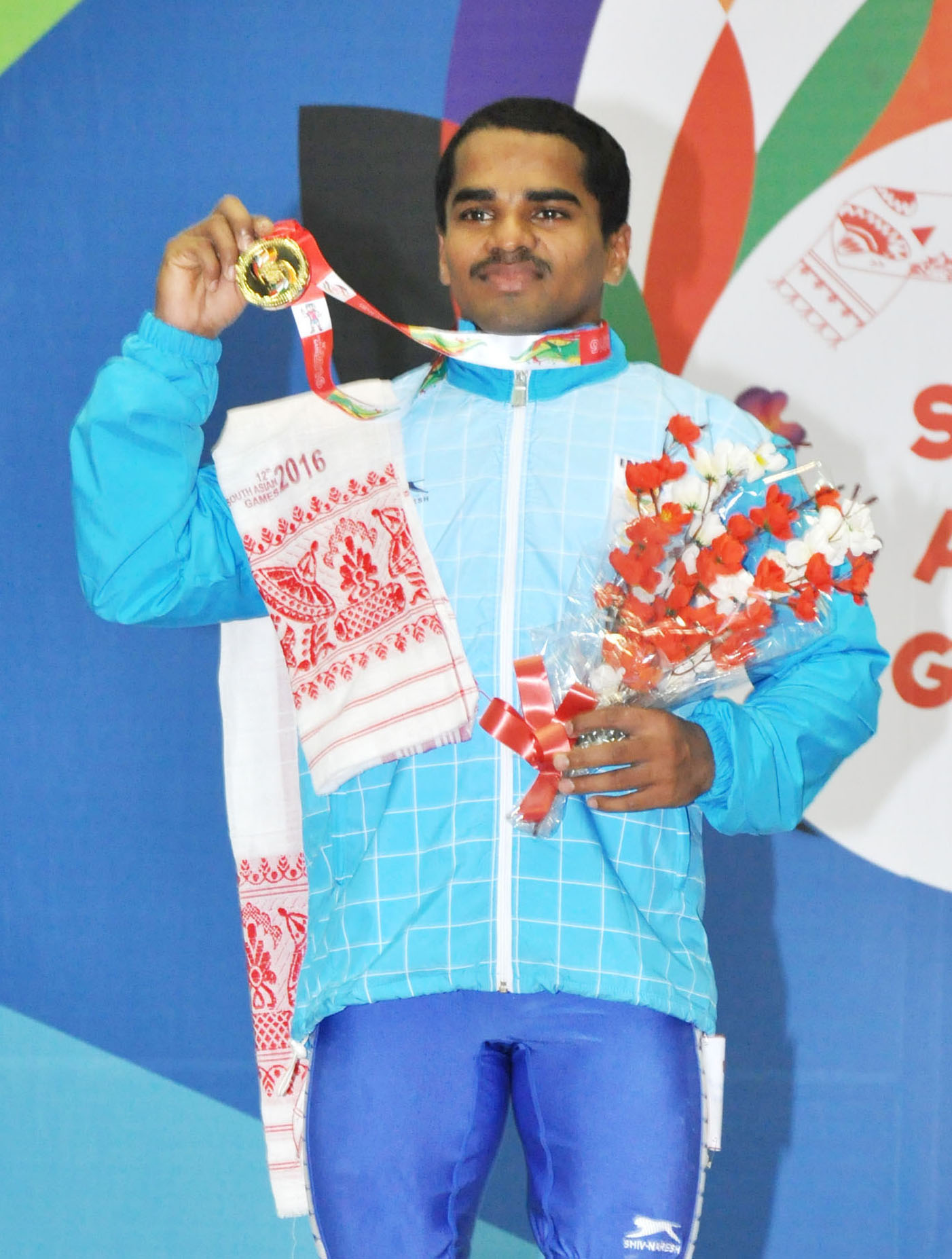
- Poojary won the gold medal in men's 56 kg weight class at the 2016 South Asian Games.

Personal information
- Nationality: Indian
- Born: P. Gururaja; 15 August 1992 (age 34) Vandse, Karnataka, India
- Education: SDM College, Ujire
- Height: 1.55 m (5 ft 1 in) (2018)
- Weight: 56 kg (123 lb) (2018)

Sport
- Country: India
- Sport: Weightlifting
- Event: 56 kg
Medal record
Men's weightlifting
Representing India
Commonwealth Games
Silver medal – second place	2018 Gold Coast	56 kg
Bronze medal – third place	2022 Birmingham	61 kg
Commonwealth Championships
Gold medal – first place	2016 Penang	56 kg
Silver medal – second place	2021 Tashkent	61 kg
Bronze medal – third place	2017 Gold Coast	56 kg

Gururaja Poojary (born 15 August 1992), also known as P. Gururaja, is an Indian weightlifter who won the silver medal in the men's 56 kg weight class at the 2018 Commonwealth Games and the bronze medal in 61 kg weight class at the 2022 Commonwealth Games.
