= Simon Ngamba =

Cameroonian weightlifter

Personal information
- Full name: Simon Isidore Ngamba
- Born: 24 December 1982 (age 43)
- Weight: 61.85 kg (136.4 lb)

Sport
- Country: Cameroon
- Sport: Weightlifting
- Weight class: 62 kg
- Team: National team
- Updated on 7 September 2016

Simon Isidore Ngamba (born 24 December 1982) is a Cameroonian male weightlifter, competing in the 62 kg category and representing Cameroon at international competitions. He competed at world championships, most recently at the 2009 World Weightlifting Championships. He participated at the 2010 Commonwealth Games in the 62 kg event.

== Major results ==
| Year | Venue | Weight | Snatch (kg) | | | | | Clean & Jerk (kg) | | | | | Total | Rank |
| Year | Venue | Weight | 1 | 2 | 3 | Result | Rank | 1 | 2 | 3 | Result | Rank | Total | Rank |
World Championships
| 2009 | Goyang, South Korea | 62 kg | 115 | ~~119~~ | ~~119~~ | 115 | 24 | ~~135~~ | 135 | ~~140~~ | 135 | 29 | 250 | 27 |
African Championships
| 2010 | Yaoundé, Cameroon | 62 kg | ~~115~~ | ~~115~~ | ~~116~~ | — | — | ~~130~~ | 130 | ~~135~~ | 130 | 4 | — | — |
| 2008 | Strand, South Africa | 62 kg | 110 | ~~116~~ | 117 | 117 | 2nd place, silver medalist(s) | 130 | 135 | ~~140~~ | 135 | 5 | 252 | 4 |
Commonwealth Games
| 2010 | Delhi, India | 62 kg | 110 | 115 | ~~117~~ | 115 | 10 | ~~130~~ | 130 | ~~136~~ | 130 | 14 | 245 | 13 |
African Games
| 2007 | Algiers, Algeria | 62 kg | 110 | 115 | ~~117~~ | 115 | 2nd place, silver medalist(s) | ~~132~~ | ~~132~~ | 132 | 132 | 7 | 247 | 4 |
