= Omkar Otari =

Indian weightlifter (born 1987)

Personal information
- Full name: Omkar Shekhar Otari
- Nationality: Indian
- Born: 16 December 1987 (age 38) Kurundwad, Kolhapur, India
- Weight: 61.76 kg (136.2 lb)

Sport
- Country: India
- Sport: Weightlifting
- Updated on 26 July 2014

Omkar Shekhar Otari (born 16 December 1987) is an Indian Weightlifter, who won Bronze medal in the men's 69 kg weight class at the 2014 Commonwealth Games at Glasgow, Scotland. He hails from Kolhapur. He also participated at the 2010 Commonwealth Games in the 62 kg event.

== Major competitions ==
| Year | Venue | Weight | Snatch (kg) | | | | Clean & Jerk (kg) | | | | Total | Rank |
| Year | Venue | Weight | 1 | 2 | 3 | Rank | 1 | 2 | 3 | Rank | Total | Rank |
Commonwealth Games
| 2010 | (Indonesia) Delhi, India | 62 kg | 119 | 123 | 125 | —N/a | 140 | ~~145~~ | ~~145~~ | —N/a | 265 | 5 |
