= Gareth Evans (weightlifter) =

Welsh weightlifter

Personal information
- Nationality: Wales
- Born: Gareth Irfon Evans; 18 April 1986 (age 40) Dundee, Scotland
- Height: 1.69 m (5 ft 7 in)
- Weight: 69 kg (152 lb)

Sport
- Country: Wales/Great Britain
- Sport: Weightlifting
- Event: –69kg
- Club: Holyhead Weightlifting Club
- Coached by: Ray Williams & Tamas Feher

Achievements and titles
- Personal bests: total: 299 kg (Queensland 2018) snatch: 136 kg (Queensland 2018) c&j: 163 kg (Queensland 2018)
Medal record
Men's weightlifting
Representing Wales
Commonwealth Games
Gold medal – first place	2018 Gold Coast	69kg
Commonwealth Championships
Silver medal – second place	2019 Apia	67kg
Bronze medal – third place	2011 Cape Town	69kg
Bronze medal – third place	2016 Penang	69kg
- Updated on 19 January 2022

Gareth Irfon Evans (born 18 April 1986) is a Welsh weightlifter. He has competed in the 62 kg and 69 kg weight categories, and was selected to represent Great Britain at the 2012 Olympics.

== Early and personal life ==
Evans was born to North Wales parents then resident in Dundee, Scotland, but the family moved back to their home in Holyhead, Anglesey before Evans started his schooling.

Evans started weightlifting aged 12, when he joined the local Holyhead Weightlifting Club. A trained painter and decorator, he gave up his job in preparation for the London 2012 Olympic Games, and moved for the preceding year to Headingley, Leeds, to train full-time at the British Weight Lifting High Performance Centre.

Evans has a daughter.

== Career ==
At the 2014 Commonwealth Games in Glasgow, Francois Etoundi a Cameroon-born weightlifter competing for Australia, competed in the men's 77 kg event where he won a bronze medal. The following day, he was arrested for breaking the nose of Evans, and ordered to pay £400 after appearing at Glasgow Sheriff Court. Etoundi was later stripped of his Commonwealth Games accreditation and sent home in disgrace.

=== London 2012 Olympics ===
At the 2012 Olympics, in the snatch he lifted 130 kg, but failed his final attempt at 133 kg. In the clean and jerk, he lifted 158 kg but failed at 160 kg. With a personal best total of 288 kg, as well as personal bests in both the snatch and the clean and jerk, he finished eighth in group B and 17th overall in the 69 kg weight category.

=== Gold Coast 2018 Commonwealth Games ===
Gareth Evans clinched his first Commonwealth Games medal during the 2018 Commonwealth Games on 6 April 2018 after winning a gold medal in the men's 69kg weightlifting event. This was also the first gold medal won by Wales at the Gold Coast Commonwealth Games.

== Major results ==
Year	Venue	Weight	Snatch (kg)				Clean & Jerk (kg)				Total	Rank
Year	Venue	Weight	1	2	3	Rank	1	2	3	Rank	Total	Rank
Representing Great Britain
Olympic Games
2012	(United Kingdom) London, Great Britain	69 kg	125	130	~~133~~	18	153	158	~~160~~	17	288	17
World Championships
2014	Almaty, Kazakhstan	62 kg	~~118~~	~~118~~	~~118~~	—	146	~~151~~	~~151~~	17	—	—
2011	Paris, France	69 kg	115	120	~~125~~	40	~~145~~	~~145~~	145	42	265	41
European Championships
2016	Førde, Norway	62 kg	115	119	~~122~~	10	~~142~~	142	~~146~~	12	261	11
2012	Antalya, Turkey	69 kg	~~121~~	121	~~126~~	15	~~150~~	150	~~155~~	14	271	14
2010	Minsk, Belarus	62 kg	105	108	111	13	130	135	~~137~~	13	246	13
Representing Wales
Commonwealth Games
2018	Gold Coast, Australia	69 kg	130	133	136	2nd place, silver medalist(s)	160	163	~~165~~	2nd place, silver medalist(s)	299	1st place, gold medalist(s)
2014	Glasgow, Scotland	62 kg	118	~~120~~	~~120~~	6	~~147~~	147	150	5	268	5
2010	Delhi, India	62 kg	105	~~110~~	111	13	135	~~140~~	~~140~~	12	246	12
