= Julius Ssekitoleko =

Ugandan weightlifter (born 2000)

Personal information
- Full name: Julius Ssekitoleko
- Nationality: Ugandan
- Born: August 7, 2000 (age 26) Mulago Hospital, Kampala, Uganda
- Height: 5 ft 7 in (170 cm)
- Weight: 56 kg (123 lb)

Sport
- Country: Uganda
- Sport: Weightlifting
- Event: –56 kg
- Club: Kisugu Unified Club
- Coached by: Kisugu Unified

Julius Ssekitoleko (born August 7, 2000) is a Ugandan Olympic weightlifter, competing in the 56 kg category and representing Uganda at international competitions. He has competed at world championships, including at the 2018 Commonwealth Games.

== Early life ==
Ssekitoleko was born August 7, 2000, in Mulago Hospital, Kampala.

== Tokyo Olympics in 2021 ==
After arriving in Japan on June 19, 2021, for the 2020 Tokyo Olympics, Ssekitoleko escaped from the Olympic village on July 18. In a note he left in his room, he said he wanted to live in Japan and start a new life.

Two days later, on July 20, he was found in Nagoya by the security cameras of a train that he had boarded. He had a mobile phone, but his passport was held by the Ugandan team. He was immediately arrested by the local police and The Ugandan Embassy arranged a flight back to Ugandan.

The first version said that Ssekitoleko wanted to escape from his country because of poverty. However, in an interview with an Argentine journalist, he said it was because he was depressed. He also revealed that the Ugandan sports authorities didn't allow him to participate. They thought that Ssekitoleko should change his -67 kg weight category due to "administrative problems". In the interview, the weightlifter said that when he arrived back in his country, the police held him for five days until he was sent to his mother's house.

== See also ==
- Immigration to Japan
- List of solved missing person cases (2020s)
