= Sonny Webster =

British weightlifter

Personal information
- Full name: Sonny Curtis Webster
- Nationality: British
- Born: 10 March 1994 (age 31); High Wycombe, Buckinghamshire, England
- Height: 1.78 m (5 ft 10 in)
- Weight: 94 kg (207 lb)

Sport
- Country: Great Britain
- Sport: Weightlifting

Sonny Curtis Webster (born 10 March 1994) is a British weightlifter. He placed 14th at the Weightlifting at the 2016 Summer Olympics – Men's 94 kg in the Men's 94 kg totaling 333 kg.

Webster graduated in sports performance from the University of Bath in 2016. He is founder of the athletic sportswear brand Big Friday Supplies, and the head coach of The Lifting Zone (previously The Sonny Webster Academy).

== Anti-doping rule violations ==
Webster has twice been issued with ineligibility bans relating to anti-doping rule violations. Firstly, he served a four-year ban from June 2017 to June 2021 after testing positive for ostarine.

Webster received a second three-year ban, from June 2021 to June 2024, for violating the terms of his initial ban by coaching athletes during that period.

== Results ==
Year	Event	Weight	Snatch (kg)	Clean & Jerk (kg)	Total (kg)	Rank
2009	European Youth Championships	69 kg	92	115	207	18
2011	World Youth Championships	77 kg	118	145	263	4
2011	European Youth Championships	85 kg	125	156	281	9
2011	European Junior Championships	85 kg	126	157	283	12
2011	Commonwealth Championships	85 kg	128	160	288	2
2011	Commonwealth Junior Championships	85 kg	128	160	288	2
2011	Commonwealth Youth Championships	85 kg	128	160	288	1
2012	European Championships	85 kg	133	160	293	15
2012	European Junior Championships	94 kg	131	168	299	16
2013	World Junior Championships	94 kg	139	171	310	12
2013	European Junior Championships	94 kg	145	175	319	3
2013	Commonwealth Championships	94 kg	142	182	324	5
2013	Commonwealth Junior Championships	94 kg	142	182	324	2
2014	European Championships	94 kg	146	178	324	13
2014	World Junior Championships	94 kg	138	183	321	4
2014	Commonwealth Games	94 kg	147	180	327	5
2014	European Junior Championships	94 kg	150	183	333	9
2015	World Championships	94 kg	151	188	339	22
2016	European Championships	94 kg	149	185	334	15
2016	Olympic Games	94 kg	148	185	333	14
