= Sudesh Peiris =

Sri Lankan weightlifter (born 1985)

Personal information
- Born: February 3, 1985 (age 41)
- Height: 1.65 m (5 ft 5 in)
- Weight: 62 kg (137 lb)

Sport
- Country: Sri Lanka
- Sport: Weightlifting
- Event: 62 kg
Medal record
Men's weightlifting
Representing Sri Lanka
Commonwealth Games
| Silver medal – second place | 2014 Glasgow | 62 kg |
| Bronze medal – third place | 2010 New Delhi | 62 kg |
South Asian Games
| Gold medal – first place | 2016 Guwahati | 62 kg |
Commonwealth Championships
| Gold medal – first place | 2011 Cape Town | 69 kg |
| Silver medal – second place | 2016 Penang | 69 kg |

Anton Sudesh Peiris Kurukulasooriyage (born February 3, 1985) is a weightlifter from Sri Lanka. Kurukulasooriyage was born in Sandalankawa, Sri Lanka. At the 2010 Commonwealth Games he won a bronze medal in the 62 kg event. Kurukulasooriyage was also selected to be a part of Sri Lanka's 2014 Commonwealth Games team, where he was the flagbearer during the opening ceremony. Later he won a silver medal in the 62 kg event.

== See also ==
- List of Sri Lankans by sport
