= Indika Dissanayake =

Sri Lankan weightlifter (born 1989)

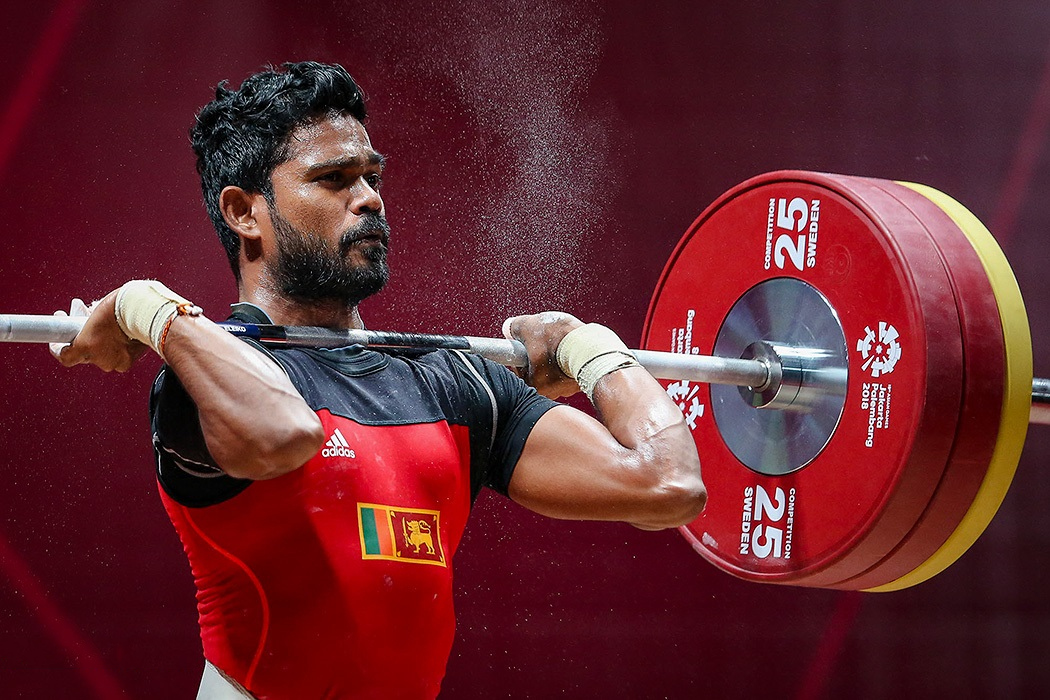
- Dissanayake at the 2018 Asian Games

Personal information
- Full name: Indika Chathuranga D. Dissanayake Mudiyanselage
- Born: 6 August 1989 (age 37) Hataraliyadda, Central Province, Sri Lanka
- Education: Kingswood College, Kandy
- Height: 165 cm (5 ft 5 in)

Sport
- Sport: Weightlifting
- Event: 69 kg
- Coached by: RB Wickramasinghe
Medal record
Men's weightlifting
Representing Sri Lanka
Commonwealth Games
Silver medal – second place	2018 Gold Coast	69 kg
Commonwealth Championships
Silver medal – second place	2013 Penang	62 kg
Silver medal – second place	2015 Pune	69 kg
Bronze medal – third place	2017 Gold Coast	69 kg
Bronze medal – third place	2021 Tashkent	73 kg
South Asian Games
Silver medal – second place	2016 Guwahati	69 kg

Indika Chathuranga D. Dissanayake Mudiyanselage (Sinhala: ඉන්ඩිකා සි. ධි. දිස්සානායක මුදියන්සේලාගේ, born 6 August 1989), also known as Indika Dissanayake, is a Sri Lankan male weightlifter. He competed in the 69 kg division at the Asian Games (in 2010 and 2018), South Asian Games (in 2016) and at the Commonwealth Games (in 2010, 2014 and 2018), and won silver medals at the 2016 South Asian Games and 2018 Commonwealth Games.

== Biography ==
Indika was born on 6 August 1989 in Hataraliyadda, Central Province of Sri Lanka. He attended the Menikdiwela Central College in Menikdiwela for his primary education and did his advanced level studies at the Kingswood College which is situated in Kandy. He also joined the Sri Lanka Navy in 2009.

== Career ==
Dissanayake claimed a silver medal at the 2016 South Asian Games. His next silver medal at the 2018 Commonwealth Games was the first silver medal for Sri Lanka at those Games. His medal was also the third medal clinched by Sri Lankan team during the Gold Coast Commonwealth Games and was also the third medal received by Sri Lanka in weightlifting category after couple of bronze medals secured by Chaturanga Lakmal and Dinusha Gomes at the 2018 Commonwealth Games.

In June 2018, Indika Dissanayake reached his highest career world ranking of 11 for the 69 kg category according to the latest world rankings revealed by the International Weightlifting Federation. This was also the highest career rating achieved by a Sri Lankan weightlifter.

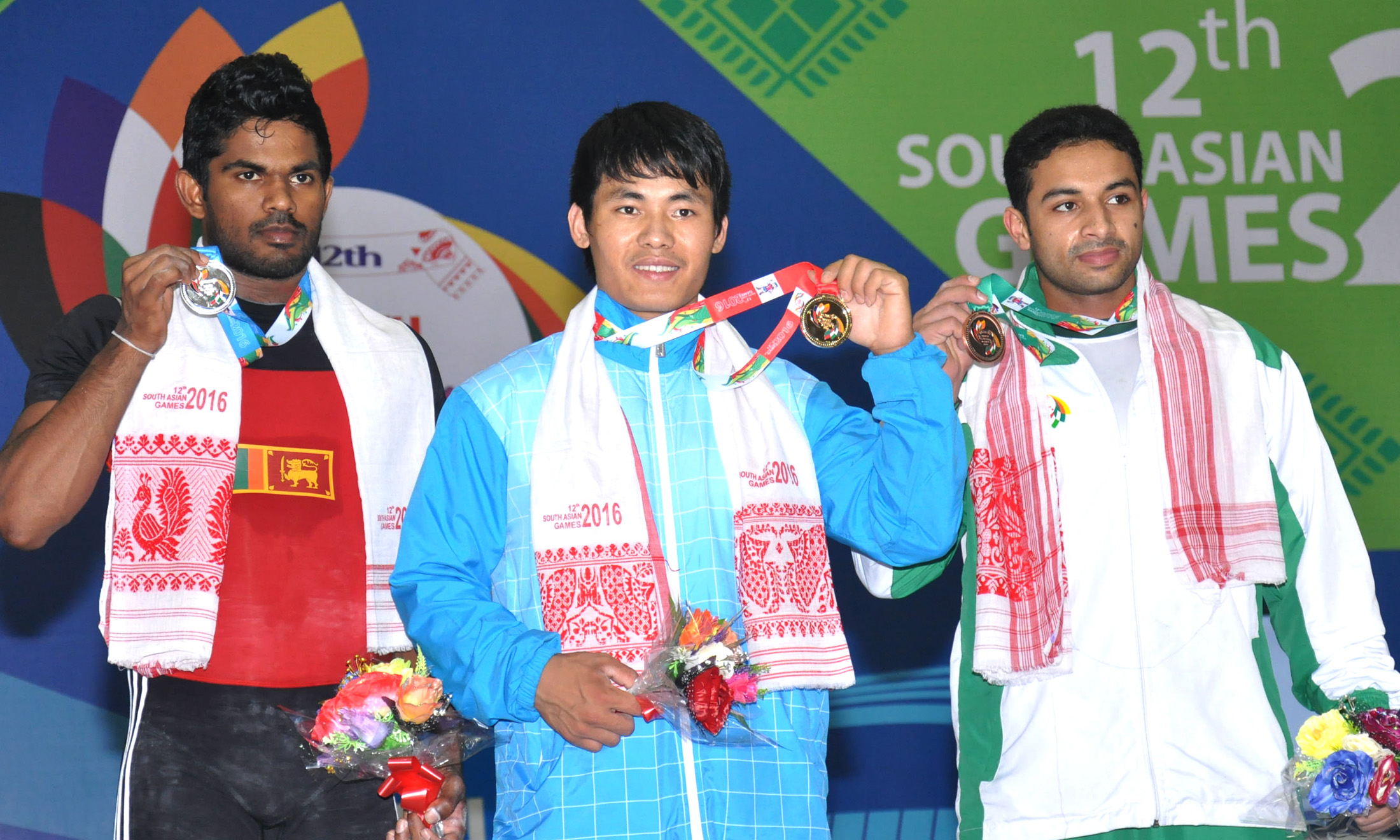
South Asian Games-2016

Dissanayake has qualified to compete for Sri Lanka at the 2022 Commonwealth Games in Birmingham, England.
