= Dimitris Minasidis =

Cypriot weightlifter (born 1989)

Personal information
- Nationality: Cyprus
- Born: 29 April 1989 (age 37) Tbilisi, Georgian SSR, Soviet Union
- Weight: 69 kg (152 lb)

Sport
- Sport: Weightlifting
- Event: 69 kg
Medal record
Men's weightlifting
Representing Cyprus
European Championships
| Silver medal – second place | 2012 Antalya | –62 kg |
| Bronze medal – third place | 2009 Bucharest | –62 kg |
Commonwealth Games
| Gold medal – first place | 2014 Glasgow | 62 kg |
- Updated on 27 July 2014

Dimitris Minasidis (Greek: Δημήτρης Μινασίδης; born 29 April 1989) is a Cypriot weightlifter.

== Career ==
Minasidis represented Cyprus at the 2008 Summer Olympics in Beijing, where he competed for the men's lightweight category (69 kg). Minasidis placed 18th in this event, as he successfully lifted 128 kg in the single-motion snatch, and hoisted 155 kg in the two-part, shoulder-to-overhead clean and jerk, for a total of 283 kg.
