= Penisimani Siolaa =

Tongan weightlifter

Personal information
- Full name: Penisimani Angelo Fonua Siolaa
- Born: 23 April 1994 (age 32)
- Weight: 68.39 kg (150.8 lb)

Sport
- Country: Tonga
- Sport: Weightlifting
- Weight class: 69 kg
- Team: National team
- Updated on 19 October 2016

Penisimani Angelo Fonua Siolaa (born 23 April 1994) is a Tongan male weightlifter, competing in the 69 kg category and representing Tonga at international competitions. He participated at the 2014 Commonwealth Games in the 69 kg event.

== Major competitions ==
| Year | Venue | Weight | Snatch (kg) | | | | Clean & Jerk (kg) | | | | Total | Rank |
| Year | Venue | Weight | 1 | 2 | 3 | Rank | 1 | 2 | 3 | Rank | Total | Rank |
Commonwealth Games
| 2014 | Glasgow, Scotland | 69 kg | 90 | ~~95~~ | ~~95~~ | —N/a | 120 | ~~125~~ | ~~125~~ | —N/a | 210 | 15 |
