= Weightlifting at the 2018 Commonwealth Games – Men's 69 kg =

Weightlifting – Men's 69 kg at the 2018 Commonwealth Games
- Venue: Carrara Sports and Leisure Centre
- Dates: 6 April 2018
- Competitors: 14 from 14 nations
- Winning total weight: 299

Medalists
gold medal	Gareth Evans	Wales
silver medal	Indika Dissanayake	Sri Lanka
bronze medal	Deepak Lather	India

The Men's 69 kg weightlifting event at the 2018 Commonwealth Games took place at the Carrara Sports and Leisure Centre on 6 April 2018. The weightlifter from Wales won the gold, with a combined lift of 299 kg.

== Records ==
Prior to this competition, the existing world, Commonwealth and Games records were as follows:

World record	Snatch	Liao Hui (CHN)	166 kg	Almaty, Kazakhstan	10 November 2014
World record	Clean & Jerk	Liao Hui (CHN)	198 kg	Wrocław, Poland	23 October 2013
World record	Total	Liao Hui (CHN)	359 kg	Almaty, Kazakhstan	10 November 2014
Commonwealth record	Snatch	Katulu Ravi Kumar (IND)	146 kg	New Delhi, India	6 October 2010
Commonwealth record	Clean & Jerk	Vencelas Dabaya (CMR)	185 kg	Tunis, Tunisia	4 May 2004
Commonwealth record	Total	Vencelas Dabaya (CMR)	330 kg	Tunis, Tunisia	4 May 2004
Games record	Snatch	Katulu Ravi Kumar (IND)	146 kg	New Delhi, India	6 October 2010
Games record	Clean & Jerk	Katulu Ravi Kumar (IND)	175 kg	New Delhi, India	6 October 2010
Games record	Total	Katulu Ravi Kumar (IND)	321 kg	New Delhi, India	6 October 2010

== Schedule ==
All times are Australian Eastern Standard Time (UTC+10)

Date	Time	Round
Friday 6 April 2018	14:12	Final

== Results ==
Rank	Athlete	Body weight (kg)	Snatch (kg)				Clean & Jerk (kg)				Total
Rank	Athlete	Body weight (kg)	1	2	3	Result	1	2	3	Result	Total
1st place, gold medalist(s)	Gareth Evans (WAL)	67.98	130	133	136	136	160	163	~~165~~	163	299
2nd place, silver medalist(s)	Indika Dissanayake (SRI)	68.94	132	137	~~139~~	137	160	~~163~~	~~163~~	160	297
3rd place, bronze medalist(s)	Deepak Lather (IND)	68.65	132	136	~~138~~	136	155	159	~~162~~	159	295
4	Vaipava Ioane (SAM)	67.52	~~125~~	125	~~130~~	125	167	~~175~~	~~175~~	167	292
5	Muhammad Erry Hidayat (MAS)	68.57	131	~~136~~	~~136~~	131	~~160~~	160	~~165~~	160	291
6	Ruben Katoatau (KIR)	68.36	120	~~123~~	~~123~~	120	155	160	~~163~~	160	280
7	Brandon Wakeling (AUS)	68.87	120	~~124~~	~~124~~	120	~~155~~	155	~~161~~	155	275
8	Larko Doguape (NRU)	68.83	~~105~~	107	~~114~~	107	135	140	~~143~~	140	247
9	Hakim Ssempereza (UGA)	68.07	105	109	~~111~~	109	130	~~135~~	136	136	245
10	Dinesh Jeuin Pandoo (MRI)	68.28	105	~~108~~	~~108~~	105	~~130~~	130	135	135	240
11	Bafokeng Moeti (LES)	68.08	~~95~~	~~95~~	95	95	~~110~~	110	115	115	210
	Abu Sufyan (PAK)	68.75	~~127~~	127	130	130	~~158~~	~~160~~	~~160~~	–	–
	Shimul Kanti Singha (BAN)	68.97	115	~~120~~	~~120~~	115	~~140~~	~~140~~	~~140~~	–	–
	Vester Villalon (NZL)	68.90	~~118~~	118	~~122~~	118	~~145~~	~~145~~	~~145~~	–	–
