= Sucrose 6F-alpha-galactosyltransferase =

Class of enzymes

Sucrose 6F-alpha-galactotransferase

Identifiers
- EC no.: 2.4.1.167
- CAS no.: 92480-04-1

Databases
- IntEnz: IntEnz view
- BRENDA: BRENDA entry
- ExPASy: NiceZyme view
- KEGG: KEGG entry
- MetaCyc: metabolic pathway
- PRIAM: profile
- PDB structures: RCSB PDB PDBe PDBsum
- Gene Ontology: AmiGO / QuickGO
Search
- PMC: articles
- PubMed: articles
- NCBI: proteins

Sucrose 6F-alpha-galactosyltransferase (EC 2.4.1.167) is an enzyme that catalyzes the chemical reaction

sucrose
+ UDP-galactose
UDP
planteose

The two substrates of this enzyme characterised from sesame are sucrose and UDP-galactose. Its products are planteose and uridine diphosphate (UDP).

This enzyme belongs to the family of glycosyltransferases, specifically the hexosyltransferases. The systematic name of this enzyme class is UDP-galactose:sucrose 6F-alpha-D-galactosyltransferase. Other names in common use include uridine diphosphogalactose-sucrose 6F-alpha-galactosyltransferase, UDPgalactose:sucrose 6fru-alpha-galactosyltransferase, and sucrose 6F-alpha-galactotransferase.
