= Daniel Koum =

Australian weightlifter

Daniel Koum Koum
Personal information
- Full name: Daniel Ebenezer Koum Koum
- Nationality: Australia
- Born: 25 May 1985 (age 41) Douala, Cameroon
- Height: 1.56 m (5 ft 1 in)
- Weight: 61 kg (134 lb)
Medal record
Men's Weightlifting
Representing Cameroon
African Weightlifting Championships
Gold medal – first place	2005 Kampala	– 56 kg
Representing Australia
Oceania Weightlifting Championships
Gold medal – first place	2008 Auckland	– 62 kg
Gold medal – first place	2009 Darwin	– 62 kg
Gold medal – first place	2010 Suva	– 62 kg
Silver medal – second place	2012 Apia	– 62 kg
Arafura Games
Gold medal – first place	2009 Darwin	– 62 kg

Daniel Ebenezer Koum Koum (born 25 May 1985, in Douala) is a Cameroon-born Australian weightlifter in the −62 kg category. In the 2011 World Weightlifting Championships that were held in Paris, France, Koum placed 29th overall with a 112 kg snatch and a 145 kg clean and jerk.

== Weightlifting career ==
At the age of 15, Koum moved to Yaoundé, Cameroon and began lifting weights inside a gym owned by his father. He developed the strength required to allow him to represent Cameroon in several international competitions such as the 2005 World Weightlifting Championships and the 2006 Commonwealth Games. He finished 5th in the 2006 Commonwealth Games.

During the 2006 Commonwealth Games in Melbourne, Koum was granted a sports visa to compete in the games. After the completion of the games, Koum chose to stay in Australia and sought asylum. After two years, he was granted Australian citizenship and was free to represent Australia in international competitions. As an Australian competitor, Koum won the Oceania Weightlifting Championships gold medal for three years running, and became a dual Victorian and Australian Championships gold medalist.

After competing in the 2012 Oceania Weightlifting Championships, it was alleged that Kuom had demanded, and received, $5000 from Australian team officials prior to agreeing to compete. Kuom was required to lift in order to allow an Australian competitor to qualify for the 2012 London Olympics. Koum has denied the allegations.
