= F6 (classification) =

Wheelchair sport classification

F6, also SP6, is a wheelchair sport classification that corresponds to the neurological level L2 - L5. Historically, this class has been known as Lower 4, Upper 5. People in this class have good sitting balance, and good forward and backward movement of their trunk. They have some use of their thighs and can press their knees together.

Sports open to people in this class include archery, adaptive rowing, ten-pin bowling, swimming, wheelchair basketball, wheelchair fencing and athletics. The process for classification into this class has a medical and functional classification process. This process is often sport specific.

== Definition ==
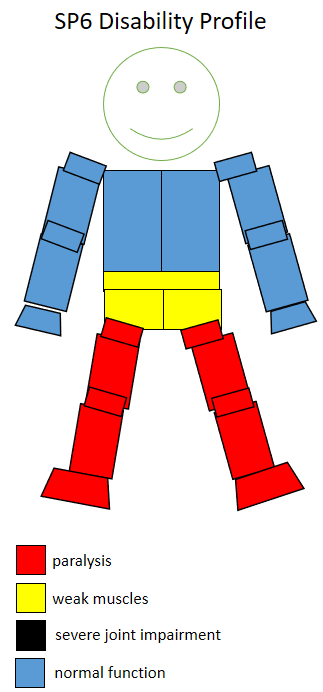
Functional profile of a wheelchair sportsperson in the F6 class.

This is wheelchair sport classification that corresponds to the neurological level L2 - L5. Historically, this class has been known as Lower 4, Upper 5.

In 2002, USA Track & Field defined this class as, "These athletes also put the shot and throw the discus and javelin. They have very good balance and movements in the forward and backward plane, with good trunk rotation. They can lift their thighs off the chair and press the knees together. Some have the ability to straighten and bend their knees. Neurological level: L2-L5." Disabled Sports USA defined the functional definition of this class in 2003 as, "Have very good balance and movements in the backwards and forwards plane. Have good trunk rotation. Can lift the thighs, i.e. off the chair (hip flexion). Can press the knees together (hip abduction). May have the ability to straighten the knees (knee extension). May have some ability to bend the knees (knee flexion)."

=== Neurological ===
The neurological definition of this class is L2 - L5. The location of lesions on different vertebrae tend to be associated with disability levels and functionality issues. L2 is associated with hip flexors. L3 is associated with knee extensors. L4 is associated with ankle doris flexors. L5 is associated with long toe extensors.

=== Anatomical ===
People with lesions at L4 have issues with their lower back muscles, hip flexors and their quadriceps. People with lesions at the L4 to S2 who are complete paraplegics may have motor function issues in their gluts and hamstrings. Their quadriceps are likely to be unaffected. They may be absent sensation below the knees and in the groin area.

=== Functional ===
People in this class have good sitting balance. People with lesions at L4 have trunk stability, can lift a leg and can flex their hips. They can walk independently with the use of longer leg braces. They may use a wheelchair for the sake of convenience. Recommended sports include many standing related sports. People in this class have a total respiratory capacity of 88% compared to people without a disability.

== Governance ==
In general, classification for spinal cord injuries and wheelchair sport is overseen by International Wheelchair and Amputee Sports Federation (IWAS), having taken over this role following the 2005 merger of ISMWSF and ISOD. From the 1950s to the early 2000s, wheelchair sport classification was handled International Stoke Mandeville Games Federation (ISMGF).

Some sports have classification managed by other organizations. In the case of athletics, classification is handled by IPC Athletics. The International Paralympic Committee manages classification for a number of spinal cord injury and wheelchair sports including alpine skiing, biathlon, cross country skiing, ice sledge hockey, powerlifting, shooting, swimming, and wheelchair dance.

Some sports specifically for people with disabilities, like race running, have two governing bodies that work together to allow different types of disabilities to participate. Classification is also handled at the national level or at the national sport specific level. In the United States, this has been handled by Wheelchair Sports, USA (WSUSA) who managed wheelchair track, field, slalom, and long-distance events. For wheelchair basketball in Canada, classification is handled by Wheelchair Basketball Canada.

== History ==
Early on in this classes history, the class had a different name and was based on medical classification and originally intended for athletics. During the 1960s and 1970s, classification involved being examined in a supine position on an examination table, where multiple medical classifiers would often stand around the player, poke and prod their muscles with their hands and with pins. The system had no built in privacy safeguards and players being classified were not insured privacy during medical classification nor with their medical records.

During the late 1960s, people oftentimes tried to cheat classification to get in classified more favorably. The group most likely to try to cheat at classification were wheelchair basketball players with complete spinal cord injuries located at the high thoracic transection of the spine. Starting in the 1980s and going into the 1990s, this class began to be more defined around functional classification instead of a medical one.

== Sports ==
=== Athletics ===
Under the IPC Athletics classification system, this class competes in F56. Field events open to this class have included shot put, discus and javelin. In pentathlon, the events for this class have included Shot, Javelin, 200m, Discus, 1500m. F6 athletes throw from a seated position, and the javelin they use weighs .6 kilograms (1.3 lb). The shot put used by women in this class weighs less than the traditional one at 3 kilograms (6.6 lb).

There are performance differences and similarities between this class and other wheelchair classes. A 1999 study of discus throwers found that for F5 to F8 discus throwers, the upper arm tends to be near horizontal at the moment of release of the discus. F5 to F7 discus throwers have greater angular speed of the shoulder girdle during release of the discus than the lower number classes of F2 to F4. F5 and F8 discus throwers have less average angular forearm speed than F2 and F4 throwers. F2 and F4 speed is caused by use of the elbow flexion to compensate for the shoulder flexion advantage of F5 to F8 throwers. A study of javelin throwers in 2003 found that F6 throwers have angular speeds of the shoulder girdle similar to that of F4, F5, F3, F7, F8 and F9 throwers. A study of was done comparing the performance of athletics competitors at the 1984 Summer Paralympics. It found there was little significant difference in performance in distance between women in 2 (SP4), 3 (SP4, SP5) and 4 (SP5, SP6) in the discus. It found there was little significant difference in performance in time between men in 2 (SP4), 3 and 4 in the 100 meters. It found there was little significant difference in performance in distance between women in 2 (SP4), 3, 4, 5 and 6 in the discus. It found there was little significant difference in performance in time between men in 3, 4, 5 and 6 in the 200 meters. It found there was little significant difference in performance in time between women in 3, 4 and 5 in the 60 meters. It found there was little significant difference in performance in distance between men in 3 and 4 in the javelin. It found there was little significant difference in performance in distance between men in 3 and 4 in the shot put. It found there was little significant difference in performance in distance between women in 4, 5 and 6 in the discus. It found there was little significant difference in performance in distance between women in 4, 5 and 6 in the javelin. It found there was little significant difference in performance in distance between women in 4, 5 and 6 in the shot put. It found there was little significant difference in performance in distance between women in 4, 5 and 6 in the discus. It found there was little significant difference in performance in time between women in 4, 5 and 6 in the 60 meters. It found there was little significant difference in performance in time between women in 4, 5 and 6 in the 800 meters. It found there was little significant difference in performance in time between women in 4, 5 and 6 in the 1,500 meters. It found there was little significant difference in performance in time between women in 4, 5 and 6 in the slalom. It found there was little significant difference in performance in distance between men in 4, 5 and 6in the discus. It found there was little significant difference in performance in distance between men in 4, 5 and 6 in the shot put. It found there was little significant difference in performance in time between men in 4, 5 and 6 in the 100 meters. It found there was little significant difference in performance in time between men in 4, 5 and 6 in the 800 meters. It found there was little significant difference in performance in time between men in 4, 5 and 6 in the 1,500 meters. It found there was little significant difference in performance in time between men in 4, 5 and 6 in the slalom. It found there was little significant difference in performance in distance between women in 5 and 6 in the discus. It found there was little significant difference in performance in time between women in 5 and 6 in the 60 meters. It found there was little significant difference in performance in time between women in 5 and 6 in the 100 meters. It found there was little significant difference in performance in distance between men in 5 and 6 in the javelin. It found there was little significant difference in performance in distance between men in 5 and 6 in the shot put. It found there was little significant difference in performance in time between men in 5 and 6 in the 100 meters.

=== Swimming ===
Swimmers in this class compete in a number of IPC swimming classes. These include S5, SB5, S7 and S8. People in SB5 tend to be complete paraplegics below T11 to L1 who cannot use their legs for swimming, or complete paraplegics at L2 to L3 with surgical rods put in their spinal column from T4 to T6 which affects their balance. S7 swimmers with spinal cord injuries tend to be complete paraplegics with lesions below L2 to L3. When swimming, they are able to do an effect catch phase because of good hand control. They can use their arms to get power and maintain control. Their hips are higher in the water than lower numbered classes for people with spinal cord injuries. While they have no kick movement in their legs, they are able to keep their legs in a streamlined position. They use their hands for turns. They either do a sitting dive start or start in the water. S8 swimmers with spinal cord injuries tend to be complete paraplegics with lesions below L4 to L5. When swimming, they are able to kick but limited use of their ankles means that their propulsion from kicking can be limited. They normally do diving starts from the platform but are not able to get full power because of limited use of their legs. They do leg turns but have limited propulsion power off the wall.

A study of was done comparing the performance of athletics competitors at the 1984 Summer Paralympics. It found there was little significant difference in performance times between women in 4 (SP5, SP6), 5 (SP6, SP7) and 6 (SP7) in the 100m breaststroke. It found there was little significant difference in performance times between women in 4 (SP5, SP6), 5 (SP6, SP7) and 6 (SP7) in the 100m backstroke. It found there was little significant difference in performance times between women in 4 (SP5, SP6), 5 (SP6, SP7) and 6 (SP7) in the 100m freestyle. It found there was little significant difference in performance times between women in 4 (SP5, SP6), 5 (SP6, SP7) and 6 (SP7) in the 14 x 50 m individual medley. It found there was little significant difference in performance times between men in 4 (SP5, SP6), 5 (SP6, SP7) and 6 (SP7) in the 100m backstroke. It found there was little significant difference in performance times between men in 4 (SP5, SP6), 5 (SP6, SP7) and 6 (SP7) in the 100m breaststroke. It found there was little significant difference in performance times between women in 2 (SP4), 3 (SP4, SP5) and 4 (SP5, SP6) in the 25 m butterfly. It found there was little significant difference in performance times between men in 2 (SP4), 3 (SP4, SP5) and 4 (SP5, SP6) in the 25 m butterfly. It found there was little significant difference in performance times between women in 5 (SP6, SP7) and 6 (SP7) in the 50 m butterfly. It found there was little significant difference in performance times between men in 5 (SP6, SP7) and 6 (SP7) in the 4 x 50 m individual medley. It found there was little significant difference in performance times between men in 5 (SP6, SP7) and 6 (SP7) in the 100 m freestyle.

=== Wheelchair basketball ===
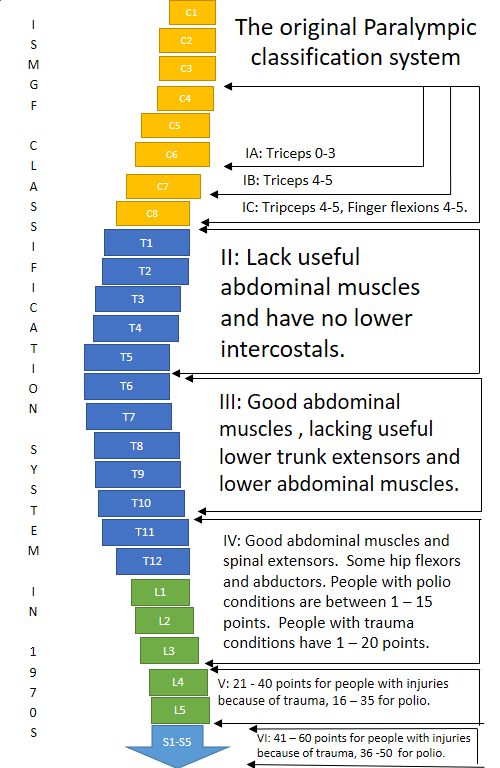
The original ISMGF classification system used at early Paralympic Games.

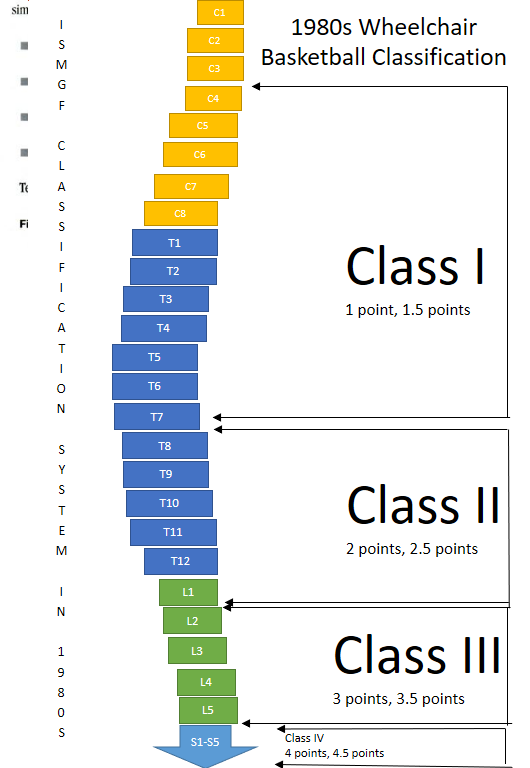
The wheelchair basketball classification system used during the 1980s was mostly functional, but had medical lesion based elements as a guideline. A maximum of 14 points was allowed on the floor at any time.

The original wheelchair basketball classification system in 1966 had 5 classes: A, B, C, D, S. Each class was worth so many points. A was worth 1, B and C were worth 2. D and S were worth 3 points. A team could have a maximum of 12 points on the floor. This system was the one in place for the 1968 Summer Paralympics. Class A was for T1-T9 complete. Class B was for T1-T9 incomplete. Class C was for T10-L2 complete. Class D was for T10-L2 incomplete. Class S was for Cauda equina paralysis. This class would have been part of Class C or Class D.

From 1969 to 1973, a classification system designed by Australian Dr. Bedwell was used. This system used some muscle testing to determine which class incomplete paraplegics should be classified in. It used a point system based on the ISMGF classification system. Class IA, IB and IC were worth 1 point. Class II for people with lesions between T1-T5 and no balance were also worth 1 point. Class III for people with lesions at T6-T10 and have fair balance were worth 1 point. Class IV was for people with lesions at T11-L3 and good trunk muscles. They were worth 2 points. Class V was for people with lesions at L4 to L5 with good leg muscles. Class IV was for people with lesions at S1-S4 with good leg muscles. Class V and IV were worth 3 points. The Daniels/Worthington muscle test was used to determine who was in class V and who was class IV. Paraplegics with 61 to 80 points on this scale were not eligible. A team could have a maximum of 11 points on the floor. The system was designed to keep out people with less severe spinal cord injuries, and had no medical basis in many cases. This class would have been IV or V.

In 1982, wheelchair basketball finally made the move to a functional classification system internationally. While the traditional medical system of where a spinal cord injury was located could be part of classification, it was only one advisory component. With this system, players in this class became Class II and 3 or 3.5 point players. A maximum of 14 points was allowed on the court at a time. Under the current system, they would likely be classified a 3 point player. if they are L2 to L4. They are likely to be classified a 4-point player if they are L5 to S2.

=== Wheelchair fencing ===
Generally, people in this class are classified as 3 or 4. Wheelchair fencers from this class who are classified as 3 are paraplegics from D10 to L2, scoring between 5 and 9 points on Type 1 and Type 2 function tests. For class 4, fencers tend to have a lesion below L4. They tend to score at least 5 points on Type 3 and Type 4 of the function test. For international IWF sanctioned competitions, classes are combined. 3 and 4 are combined, competing as Category A.

=== Other sports ===
One of the sports open to people in this class is archery. People in this class compete in ARW2. This class is for people who have limited to good trunk function and normal functioning in their arms. It includes paraplegic archers, while ARW1 includes tetraplegic archers. Rowing is another sport open to people in this class. Currently, people with complete spinal cord injury at L3 level or incomplete lesion at L1 compete in TA. This class is for people with trunk and arm function. In 1991, the first internationally accepted adaptive rowing classification system was established and put into use. People from this class were initially classified as P2 for people with lesions at T10-L4. Ten-pin bowling is another sport open to people in this class, where they compete in TPB8. People in this class do not have more than 70 points for functionality, have normal arm pitch for throwing and use a wheelchair.

== Getting classified ==
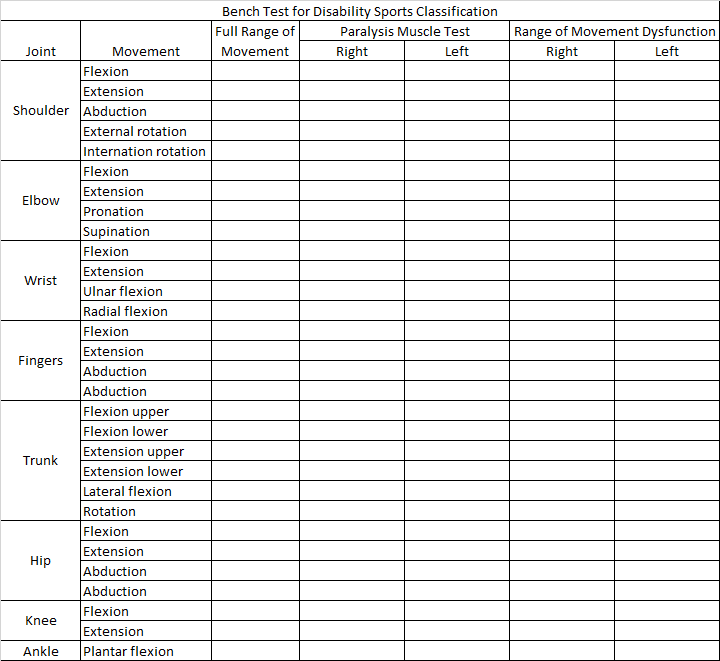
A standard bench press form used to for functional classification for wheelchair sportspeople.

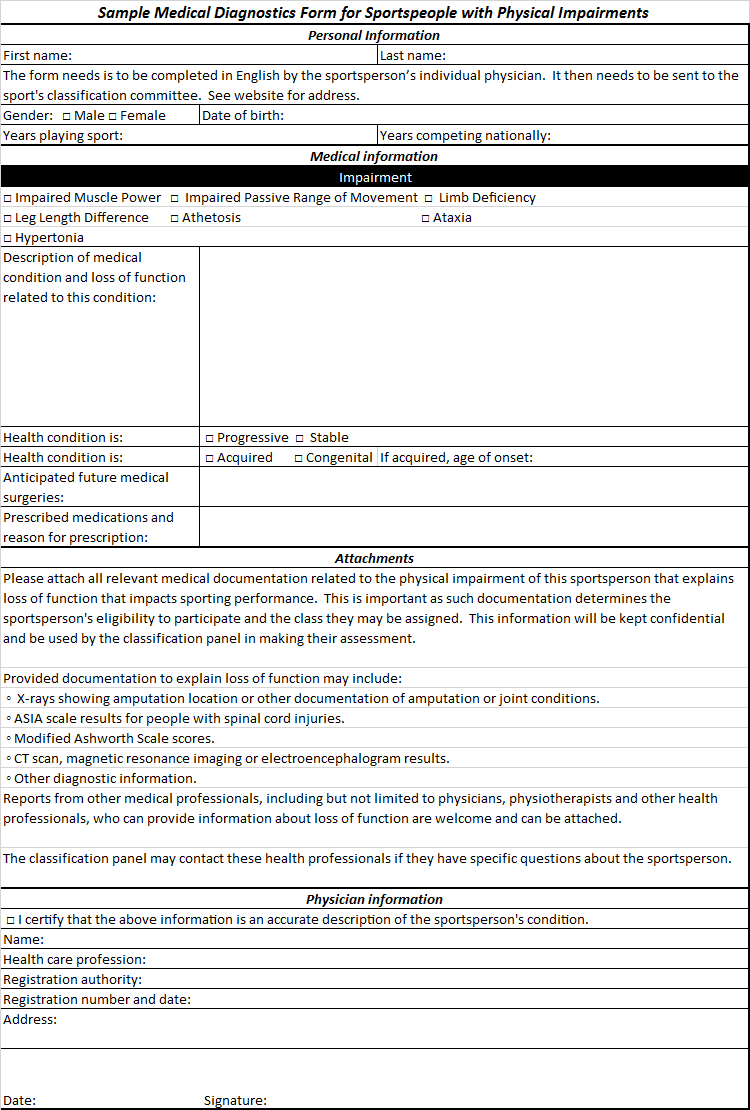
A sample medical classification form. Sportspeople would need some form of this sent to a classification panel.

Classification is often sport specific, and has two parts: a medical classification process and a functional classification process.

Medical classification for wheelchair sport can consist of medical records being sent to medical classifiers at the international sports federation. The sportsperson's physician may be asked to provide extensive medical information including medical diagnosis and any loss of function related to their condition. This includes if the condition is progressive or stable, if it is an acquired or congenital condition. It may include a request for information on any future anticipated medical care. It may also include a request for any medications the person is taking. Documentation that may be required may include X-rays, ASIA scale results, or Modified Ashworth Scale scores.

One of the standard means of assessing functional classification is the bench test, which is used in swimming, lawn bowls and wheelchair fencing. Using the Adapted Research Council (MRC) measurements, muscle strength is tested using the bench press for a variety of spinal cord related injuries with a muscle being assessed on a scale of 0 to 5. A 0 is for no muscle contraction. A 1 is for a flicker or trace of contraction in a muscle. A 2 is for active movement in a muscle with gravity eliminated. A 3 is for movement against gravity. A 4 is for active movement against gravity with some resistance. A 5 is for normal muscle movement.

During functional and medical classification, a number of tests may be run for people in this class. For the trunk rotation test, people in this class are expected to have abdominal function and lower limb function demonstrated by having hip flexors and abductors.

Wheelchair fencing classification has 6 test for functionality during classification, along with a bench test. Each test gives 0 to 3 points. A 0 is for no function. A 1 is for minimum movement. A 2 is for fair movement but weak execution. A 3 is for normal execution. The first test is an extension of the dorsal musculature. The second test is for lateral balance of the upper limbs. The third test measures trunk extension of the lumbar muscles. The fourth test measures lateral balance while holding a weapon. The fifth test measures the trunk movement in a position between that recorded in tests one and three, and tests two and four. The sixth test measures the trunk extension involving the lumbar and dorsal muscles while leaning forward at a 45 degree angle. In addition, a bench test is required to be performed.
