= Weightlifting at the 2018 Commonwealth Games – Women's 48 kg =

Weightlifting – Women's 48 kg at the 2018 Commonwealth Games
- Venue: Carrara Sports and Leisure Centre
- Dates: 5 April 2018
- Competitors: 11 from 11 nations
- Winning total weight: 196

Medalists
gold medal	Saikhom Mirabai Chanu	India
silver medal	Roilya Ranaivosoa	Mauritius
bronze medal	Dinusha Gomes	Sri Lanka

The Women's 48 kg weightlifting event at the 2018 Commonwealth Games took place at the Carrara Sports and Leisure Centre on 5 April 2018. The weightlifter from India won the gold, with a combined lift of 196 kg.

== Records ==
Prior to this competition, the existing world, Commonwealth and Games records were as follows:

World record	Snatch	Yang Lian (CHN)	98 kg	Santo Domingo, Dominican Republic	1 October 2006
World record	Clean & Jerk	Nurcan Taylan (TUR)	121 kg	Antalya, Turkey	17 September 2010
World record	Total	Yang Lian (CHN)	217 kg	Santo Domingo, Dominican Republic	1 October 2006
Commonwealth record	Snatch	Saikhom Mirabai Chanu (IND)	85 kg	Gold Coast, Australia	5 April 2018
Commonwealth record	Clean & Jerk	Saikhom Mirabai Chanu (IND)	109 kg	Gold Coast, Australia	5 April 2018
Commonwealth record	Total	Saikhom Mirabai Chanu (IND)	194 kg	Gold Coast, Australia	5 April 2018
Games record	Snatch	Saikhom Mirabai Chanu (IND)	85 kg	Gold Coast, Australia	5 April 2018
Games record	Clean & Jerk	Saikhom Mirabai Chanu (IND)	109 kg	Gold Coast, Australia	5 April 2018
Games record	Total	Saikhom Mirabai Chanu (IND)	194 kg	Gold Coast, Australia	5 April 2018

The following records were established during the competition:

Snatch	86 kg	Saikhom Mirabai Chanu (IND)	CR, GR
Clean & Jerk	110 kg	Saikhom Mirabai Chanu (IND)	CR, GR
Total	196 kg	Saikhom Mirabai Chanu (IND)	CR, GR

== Schedule ==
All times are Australian Eastern Standard Time (UTC+10)

Date	Time	Round
Thursday 5 April 2018	14:12	Final

== Results ==
Rank	Athlete	Body weight (kg)	Snatch (kg)				Clean & Jerk (kg)				Total
Rank	Athlete	Body weight (kg)	1	2	3	Result	1	2	3	Result	Total
1st place, gold medalist(s)	Saikhom Mirabai Chanu (IND)	47.91	80	84	86	86 CR/GR	103	107	110	110 CR/GR	196 CR/GR
2nd place, silver medalist(s)	Roilya Ranaivosoa (MRI)	47.85	73	76	~~78~~	76	90	~~94~~	94	94	170
3rd place, bronze medalist(s)	Dinusha Gomes (SRI)	47.94	66	70	~~74~~	70	85	~~90~~	~~90~~	85	155
4	Thelma Toua (PNG)	47.87	65	~~70~~	~~70~~	65	85	88	90	90	155
5	Monica Uweh (NGR)	47.71	~~66~~	66	~~67~~	66	~~88~~	88	~~90~~	88	154
6	Kelly-Jo Robson (ENG)	47.91	~~65~~	~~65~~	65	65	~~83~~	83	86	86	151
7	Alyce Stephenson (AUS)	47.85	59	~~61~~	61	61	80	83	~~85~~	83	144
8	Lisa Tobias (SCO)	47.64	~~60~~	~~60~~	60	60	77	~~79~~	79	79	139
9	Seruwaia Malani (FIJ)	47.70	~~60~~	60	~~63~~	60	~~73~~	73	76	76	136
10	Hannah Powell (WAL)	47.00	52	54	56	56	65	70	72	72	136
–	Amanda Braddock (CAN)	47.61	73	~~76~~	76	76	~~93~~	~~93~~	~~93~~	–	–
