= Rustam Sarang =

Indian weightlifter (born 1988)

Personal information
- Born: 12 September 1988 (age 37) Raipur, Chhattisgarh India
- Height: 1.66 m (5 ft 5 in) (2014)
- Weight: 62 kg (137 lb) (2014)

Sport
- Country: India
- Sport: Weightlifting
- Event: 62 kg
- Club: Jai satnam vyam shala, Raipur
- Team: Chhattisgarh Police
- Coached by: Budhram Sarang

Achievements and titles
- World finals: world weightlifting championship[Olympic qualification event]-2011(Paris) France. Secured 25th rank in 62kg Bodyweight category. World weightlifting championship[Olympic qualification event]-2014(Almaty) Kazakhstan. Secured 25th rank in 62kg body weight category
- National finals: National champion 2011,2012 & 2014. 33rd National games silver medalist (2007). 35th national Games Gold medalist (2015). Junior National champions-2006
- Highest world ranking: National Junior record break in year-2007. Senior National record holder in clean & jerk event.
Medal record
Men's weightlifting

Rustam Sarang (born 12 December 1988) is an Indian weightlifter who placed seventh in the Men's 62 kg weight class at the 2014 Commonwealth Games at Glasgow.
