= Palitha Bandara =

Sri Lankan track and field athlete

Personal information
- Full name: Palitha Bandara Halgahawela Gedara
- Born: 6 September 1992 (age 34) Matale, Central Province, Sri Lanka

Sport
- Events: shot put, discus throw
Medal record
Men's para-athletics
Representing Sri Lanka
Commonwealth Games
Silver medal – second place	2022 Birmingham	Discus throw F44/64
Asian Para Games
Silver medal – second place	2018 Jakarta	Shot put F42/61/63
Silver medal – second place	2026 Aichi-Nagoya	Shot put F42/61/63
Bronze medal – third place	2022 Hangzhou	Shot put F63

Palitha Bandara Halgahawela Gedara (born 6 September 1992), commonly known as Palitha Bandara or Palitha Halgahawela, is a Sri Lankan para athlete who has specialized in discus throw and shot put. He is currently attached with Sri Lankan Army as an army corporal.

== Career ==
He faced a career threatening injury to his left knee when he played volleyball with Army in 2013. Some sources depict he met with an accident in 2011 and injured his left leg badly. He pursued his career in para sports especially in shot put F42 category the following year in 2014 ever since his muscle function was impaired above his left knee.

He rose to prominence and limelight at the 2018 Army Para Games where he set two new meet records in both shot put and discus throw events with distances of 40.30 meters and 12.80 meters. He also claimed silver medal in javelin throw at 2018 Army Para Games and was also adjudged as the best para athlete of the competition. He claimed silver medal in the men's shot put event at the 2018 Asian Para Games. He took part in men's shot put F63 event at the 2019 World Para Athletics Championships in Dubai.

In February 2021, he cleared a distance of 13.42 meters at the World Para Grand Prix which earned him a guaranteed spot for the 2020 Summer Paralympics. He claimed a bronze medal in men's shot put event at 2021 Fazza World Para Athletic Championship in Dubai. He represented Sri Lanka at the 2020 Summer Paralympics and it also marked his maiden appearance at the Summer Paralympics. He was one of the members of the nine member contingent to represent Sri Lanka at the Tokyo Paralympics. On 4 September 2021, he was placed at fifth position in men's shot put F63 final event during the 2020 Summer Paralympics after clearing a distance of 13.40 meters.

He represented Sri Lanka at the 2022 Commonwealth Games and also marked his debut appearance at the Commonwealth Games. He was also the only para athlete to represent Sri Lanka at Birmingham Commonwealth Games. He decided to take up discus throw since shot put was not part of the 2022 Commonwealth Games schedule and he pursued discus throw from December 2021 under the guidance of national coach Prabath Danushka Perera.

He claimed silver medal in men's F42-44/61-64 discus throw final at the 2022 Commonwealth Games after clearing a distance of 44.20 meters garnering 944 points. He became the first Sri Lankan to win a Para Sports medal for Sri Lanka in Commonwealth Games history.
