= Dinusha Gomes =

Sri Lankan weightlifter (born 1992)

Personal information
- Full name: Dinusha Hansani Gomes
- Born: 30 December 1992 (age 33) Panadura, Western Province, Sri Lanka
- Height: 150 cm (4 ft 11 in)
- Weight: 48 kg (106 lb)

Sport
- Sport: Weightlifting
- Event: women's 48kg
Medal record
Women's weightlifting
Representing Sri Lanka
Commonwealth Games
Bronze medal – third place	2018 Gold Coast	48kg
Commonwealth Championships
Bronze medal – third place	2016 Penang	48kg
Bronze medal – third place	2017 Gold Coast	48kg

Dinusha Hansani Gomes (born 30 December 1992), also known as Hansani Gomes, is a Sri Lankan female weightlifter. She was named as one of the members of the Sri Lankan contingent at the 2018 Commonwealth Games and claimed a bronze medal in the women's 48kg event on the opening day of the competition on 5 April 2018, which was also the second medal earned by Sri Lanka at the 2018 Gold Coast Commonwealth Games and was also the second medal secured by the Sri Lankan contingent in weightlifting category. Gomes also won Sri Lanka's first ever weightlifting medal by a woman at the Commonwealth Games.

Earlier on the opening day Chaturanga Lakmal received a bronze medal in weightlifting for Sri Lanka at the men's 56kg weightlifting event, which was ultimately Sri Lanka's first medal achieved at the 2018 Commonwealth Games.

In August 2018, Gomas, was named to Sri Lanka at the 2018 Asian Games team. Gomas was also the country's flag bearer at the opening ceremony.
