= Charles Ssekyaaya =

Ugandan weightlifter

Personal information
- Born: 11 April 1994 (age 32)
- Height: 1.59 m (5 ft 2 1/2 in)
- Weight: 67 kg (148 lb)

Sport
- Country: Uganda
- Sport: Weightlifting

Charles Ssekyaaya (born 11 April 1994) is a Ugandan weightlifter. He competed at the 2012 Summer Olympics in the Men's 62 kg, finishing 13th.

== Early life and career ==
Ssekyaaya was born on 11 April 1994 in Mulago to Godfrey Ssevume.

Ssekyaaya started lifting weights at a young age by starting training locally in Uganda before rising to continental competitions. In 2010, Ssekyaaya participated in the Africa Youth Games and Youth Commonwealth games and he won two gold medals.

In 2012 London Olympics, he competed in the Men’s 62 kg category, lifting 105 kg in snatch and 130 kg in clean and jerk for a total of 235 kg, finishing 13th in the event. In the same year, Ssekyaaya participated in the African Championships thus winning gold in snatch and jerk and the Nile Special/Uspa Sports Personality Award in March.

Ssekyaaya also represented Uganda at the 2014 Commonwealth Games in Scotland and finished 10th in the Men’s 62 kg class with a total of 255 kg (113 snatch and 142 clean and jerk).

In the 2015 IWF World Championships (Houston, USA), Ssekyaaya had six successful lifts and recorded a total of 263 kg, setting Ugandan national records in both the clean and jerk and total in the Men’s 62 kg category and this was during his training under an Olympic Solidarity scholarship at the US Olympic Training.

Ssekyaaya represented Uganda at the 2018 Commonwealth Games held in Gold Coast, Australia, where he competed in the 73 kg category and in 2022, he participated in the African Weightlifting Championships.

== Awards and achievements ==
In 2010, Ssekyaaya won gold at Africa Youth Games and a bronze at Youth Commonwealth.

In 2011, he received a national recognition as top Ugandan weightlifter.

In 2012, he won the Nile Special/Uspa award for the month of March.

2014 Commonwealth Youth Championships, Ssekyaaya won a silver medal.

== See also ==
- Godfrey Baligeya
- Fred Bunjo
