= Chaturanga Lakmal =

Sri Lankan weightlifter (born 1988)

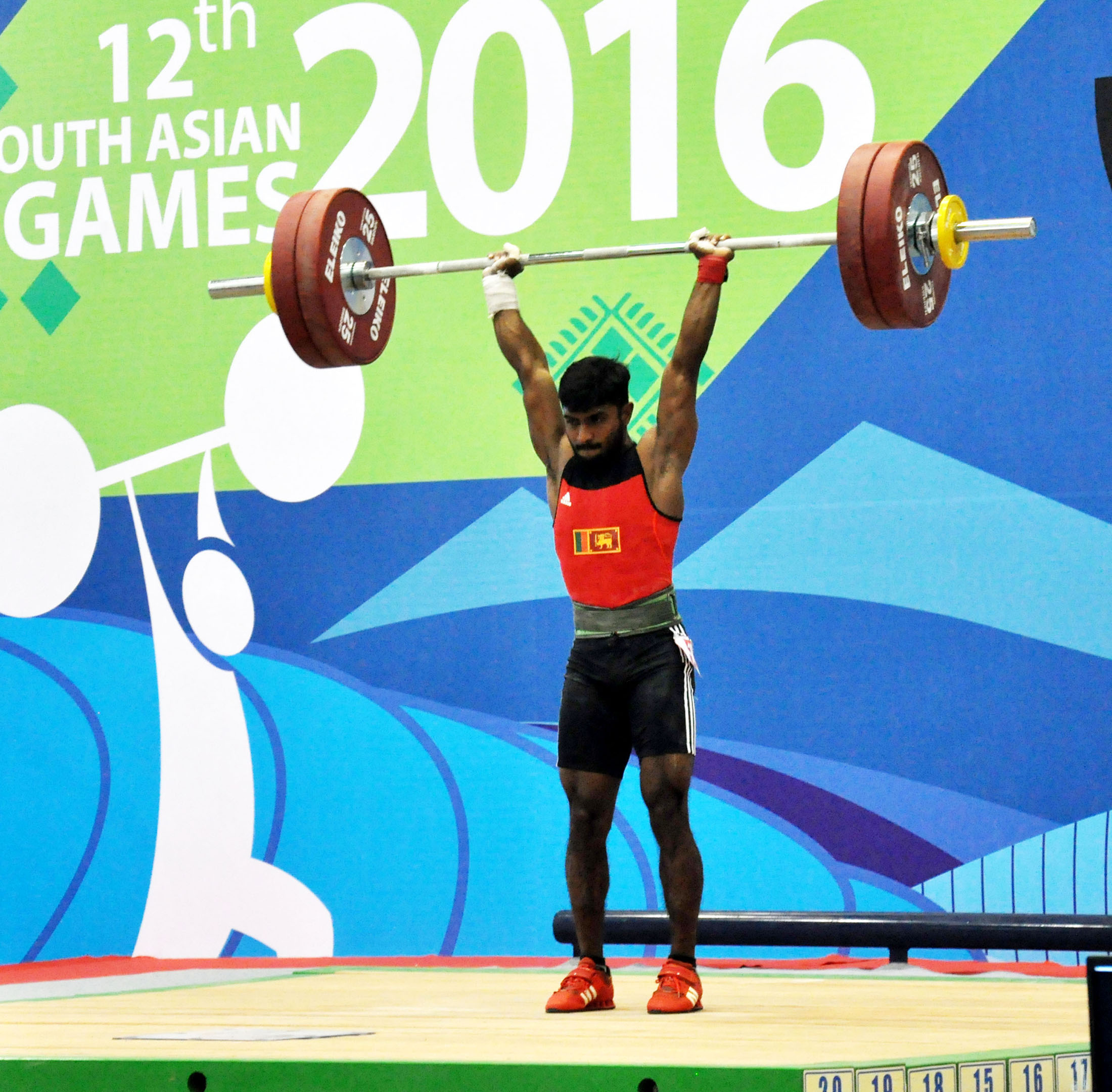
- Chathuranga Lakmal lifts the weight to win silver medal at the 2016 South Asian Games

Personal information
- Full name: Chaturanga Lakmal Jayasooriya Arachchilage
- Born: 7 October 1988 (age 38) Gampaha, Western Province, Sri Lanka
- Height: 160 cm (5 ft 3 in)
- Weight: 56 kg (123 lb) 61kg

Sport
- Sport: weightlifting
- Event: men's 56kg
Medal record
Men's weightlifting
Representing Sri Lanka
Commonwealth Games
Bronze medal – third place	2018 Gold Coast	56kg
Commonwealth Championships
Silver medal – second place	2017 Gold Coast	56kg
South Asian Games
Silver medal – second place	2016 Guwahati	56kg

Chaturanga Lakmal Jayasooriya Arachchilage also known as Chathuranga Lakmal (born 7 October 1988) is a Sri Lankan male weightlifter.

== Career ==
He competed for Sri Lanka in the 2016 South Asian Games and claimed a silver medal in the men's 56 kg event.

He was named as one of the members of the Sri Lankan contingent at the 2018 Commonwealth Games. Chaturanga Lakmal also claimed the nation's first Commonwealth Games medal during the 2018 Commonwealth Games after clinching a bronze medal in the men's 56kg weightlifting event on the opening day of the competition. Later on the same day after Chaturanga Lakmal's bronze medal, Sri Lanka received another bronze medal in weightlifting with Dinusha Gomes claiming a bronze in the women's 58 kg weightlifting category, which was ultimately Sri Lanka's second medal at the Gold Coast Commonwealth Games. He is qualified to compete at the 2019 World Weightlifting Championships in the men's 61kg category.

Lakmal has qualified to compete for Sri Lanka at the 2022 Commonwealth Games in Birmingham, England.
