= Chris Freebury =

British weightlifter

Personal information
- Full name: Christopher Xavier Freebury
- Nickname: boldy
- Born: 22 May 1989 (age 37) Derby, United Kingdom
- Height: 1.68 m (5 ft 6 in)
- Weight: 67.75 kg (149.4 lb)

Sport
- Country: Great Britain
- Sport: Weightlifting
- Team: National team
- Coached by: Cyril Martin
- Updated on 4 September 2016

Christopher Xavier Freebury (born 22 May 1989 in Derby) is a British male weightlifter, competing in the 69 kg category and representing England and Great Britain at international competitions. He represented England at the 2010 and 2014 Commonwealth Games. He competed at world championships, most recently at the 2014 World Weightlifting Championships. His coach is Cyril Martin.

He began weightlifting because he was too short to play water polo. He first tried weightlifting at age 12. He took it up competitively at age 16.

== Major results ==
Year	Venue	Weight	Snatch (kg)				Clean & Jerk (kg)				Total	Rank
Year	Venue	Weight	1	2	3	Rank	1	2	3	Rank	Total	Rank
World Championships
2014	Houston, United States	69 kg	120	~~126~~	~~126~~	39	146	~~151~~	151	32	271	34
