= Godfrey Baligeya =

Ugandan weightlifter

Personal information
- Full name: Godfrey Baligeya
- Born: 28 July 1987 (age 38)
- Weight: 84.12 kg (185.5 lb)

Sport
- Country: Uganda
- Sport: Weightlifting
- Weight class: 85 kg
- Team: National team
- Updated on 12 October 2016

Godfrey Baligeya (born 28 July 1987) is a Ugandan male weightlifter, competing in the 85 kg category and representing Uganda at international competitions. He participated at the 2010 Commonwealth Games in the 85 kg event.

== Major competitions ==
Year	Venue	Weight	Snatch (kg)				Clean & Jerk (kg)				Total	Rank
Year	Venue	Weight	1	2	3	Rank	1	2	3	Rank	Total	Rank
Commonwealth Games
2010	(Indonesia) Delhi, India	85 kg	110	115	~~118~~	—N/a	140	145	~~150~~	—N/a	260	12
