= Weightlifting at the 2018 Commonwealth Games – Men's 56 kg =

Weightlifting – Men's 56 kg at the 2018 Commonwealth Games
- Venue: Carrara Sports and Leisure Centre
- Dates: 5 April 2018
- Competitors: 12 from 12 nations
- Winning total weight: 261

Medalists
gold medal	Azroy Hazalwafie	Malaysia
silver medal	Gururaja	India
bronze medal	Chaturanga Lakmal	Sri Lanka

The Men's 56 kg weightlifting event at the 2018 Commonwealth Games took place at the Carrara Sports and Leisure Centre on 5 April 2018. The weightlifter from Malaysia won the gold, with a combined lift of 261 kg.

== Records ==
Prior to this competition, the existing world, Commonwealth and Games records were as follows:

World record	Snatch	Wu Jingbiao (CHN)	139 kg	Houston, United States	21 November 2015
World record	Clean & Jerk	Om Yun-chol (PRK)	171 kg	Houston, United States	21 November 2015
World record	Total	Long Qingquan (CHN)	307 kg	Rio de Janeiro, Brazil	7 August 2016
Commonwealth record	Snatch	Amirul Hamizan Ibrahim (MAS)	121 kg	Kanazawa, Japan	27 April 2008
Commonwealth record	Clean & Jerk	Arumagam K. Pandyan (IND)	147 kg	Vishakapatnam, India	17 January 2001
Commonwealth record	Total	Amirul Hamizan Ibrahim (MAS)	265 kg	Beijing, China	10 August 2008
Games record	Snatch	Amirul Hamizan Ibrahim (MAS)	116 kg	New Delhi, India	4 October 2010
Games record	Clean & Jerk	Amirul Hamizan Ibrahim (MAS)	145 kg	Manchester, England	30 July 2002
Games record	Total	Amirul Hamizan Ibrahim (MAS)	260 kg	Manchester, England	30 July 2002

The following records were established during the competition:

Snatch	117 kg	Azroy Hazalwafie (MAS)	GR
Total	261 kg	Azroy Hazalwafie (MAS)	GR

== Schedule ==
All times are Australian Eastern Standard Time (UTC+10)

Date	Time	Round
Thursday 5 April 2018	09:42	Final

== Results ==
Rank	Athlete	Body weight (kg)	Snatch (kg)				Clean & Jerk (kg)				Total
Rank	Athlete	Body weight (kg)	1	2	3	Result	1	2	3	Result	Total
1st place, gold medalist(s)	Azroy Hazalwafie (MAS)	55.88	114	117	~~119~~	117 GR	135	138	144	144	261 GR
2nd place, silver medalist(s)	Gururaja (IND)	55.94	107	~~111~~	111	111	~~138~~	~~138~~	138	138	249
3rd place, bronze medalist(s)	Chaturanga Lakmal (SRI)	55.97	110	114	~~117~~	114	131	~~134~~	134	134	248
4	Manueli Tulo (FIJ)	55.85	104	~~108~~	~~110~~	104	135	~~140~~	~~145~~	135	239
5	Elson Brechtefeld (NRU)	55.87	95	100	~~104~~	100	125	130	~~134~~	130	230
6	Abdullah Ghafoor (PAK)	55.81	~~101~~	101	~~104~~	101	126	~~130~~	~~130~~	126	227
7	Phillip Liao (AUS)	55.94	88	91	~~93~~	91	108	~~113~~	114	114	205
8	Jack Dorian Madanamoothoo (MRI)	55.21	78	83	85	85	100	106	110	110	195
9	Seth Casidsid (WAL)	55.75	75	80	~~85~~	80	95	106	~~116~~	106	186
10	Julius Ssekitoleko (UGA)	55.54	~~67~~	~~67~~	67	67	86	91	~~95~~	91	158
11	Kgotla Kgaswane (BOT)	55.00	60	64	68	68	80	86	~~90~~	86	154
12	Benjamin Ochoma (KEN)	55.63	56	60	62	62	72	76	~~80~~	76	138
