= List of Fijian records in Olympic weightlifting =

The following are the national records in Olympic weightlifting in Fiji. Records are maintained in each weight class for the snatch lift, clean and jerk lift, and the total for both lifts by the Fiji Weightlifting Association.

== Current records ==
=== Men ===
| Event | Record | Athlete | Date | Meet | Place | Ref |
60 kg
| Snatch | | | | | | |
| Clean & Jerk | | | | | | |
| Total | | | | | | |
65 kg
| Snatch | 90 kg | Apakuki Tabuwaiwai Wakanibua | 27 April 2026 | Oceania Championships | Apia, Samoa | |
| Clean & Jerk | 120 kg | Apakuki Tabuwaiwai Wakanibua | 27 April 2026 | Oceania Championships | Apia, Samoa | |
| Total | 210 kg | Apakuki Tabuwaiwai Wakanibua | 27 April 2026 | Oceania Championships | Apia, Samoa | |
71 kg
| Snatch | 132 kg | Poama Qaqa | 28 April 2026 | Oceania Championships | Apia, Samoa | |
| Clean & Jerk | 160 kg | Poama Qaqa | 28 April 2026 | Oceania Championships | Apia, Samoa | |
| Total | 292 kg | Poama Qaqa | 28 April 2026 | Oceania Championships | Apia, Samoa | |
79 kg
| Snatch | 120 kg | Daniel Zackariah Anthony Shaw | 29 April 2026 | Oceania Championships | Apia, Samoa | |
| Clean & Jerk | 145 kg | Daniel Zackariah Anthony Shaw | 29 April 2026 | Oceania Championships | Apia, Samoa | |
| Total | 265 kg | Daniel Zackariah Anthony Shaw | 29 April 2026 | Oceania Championships | Apia, Samoa | |
88 kg
| Snatch | 155 kg | Nehemiah Elder | 4 July 2025 | Pacific Mini Games | Meyuns, Palau | |
| Clean & Jerk | 175 kg | Nehemiah Elder | 4 July 2025 | Pacific Mini Games | Meyuns, Palau | |
| Total | 330 kg | Nehemiah Elder | 4 July 2025 | Pacific Mini Games | Meyuns, Palau | |
94 kg
| Snatch | 115 kg | Daniel Hephzibah | 30 April 2026 | Oceania Championships | Apia, Samoa | |
| Clean & Jerk | 150 kg | Daniel Hephzibah | 30 April 2026 | Oceania Championships | Apia, Samoa | |
| Total | 265 kg | Daniel Hephzibah | 30 April 2026 | Oceania Championships | Apia, Samoa | |
110 kg
| Snatch | 173 kg | Taniela Rainibogi | 1 May 2026 | Oceania Championships | Apia, Samoa | |
| Clean & Jerk | 208 kg | Taniela Rainibogi | 30 July 2026 | Commonwealth Games | Glasgow, United Kingdom | |
| Total | 378 kg | Taniela Rainibogi | 30 July 2026 | Commonwealth Games | Glasgow, United Kingdom | |
+110 kg
| Snatch | | | | | | |
| Clean & Jerk | | | | | | |
| Total | | | | | | |

=== Women ===
| Event | Record | Athlete | Date | Meet | Place | Ref |
48 kg
| Snatch | | | | | | |
| Clean & Jerk | | | | | | |
| Total | | | | | | |
53 kg
| Snatch | | | | | | |
| Clean & Jerk | | | | | | |
| Total | | | | | | |
58 kg
| Snatch | 50 kg | Atelina Vulakouvaki | 29 April 2026 | Oceania Championships | Apia, Samoa | |
| Clean & Jerk | 63 kg | Atelina Vulakouvaki | 29 April 2026 | Oceania Championships | Apia, Samoa | |
| Total | 113 kg | Atelina Vulakouvaki | 29 April 2026 | Oceania Championships | Apia, Samoa | |
63 kg
| Snatch | 74 kg | Mereia Turanganivalu | 29 April 2026 | Oceania Championships | Apia, Samoa | |
| Clean & Jerk | 94 kg | Mereia Turanganivalu | 29 April 2026 | Oceania Championships | Apia, Samoa | |
| Total | 168 kg | Mereia Turanganivalu | 29 April 2026 | Oceania Championships | Apia, Samoa | |
69 kg
| Snatch | 60 kg | Ulina Tinaiadivila Sagone | 30 April 2026 | Oceania Championships | Apia, Samoa | |
| Clean & Jerk | 75 kg | Ulina Tinaiadivila Sagone | 30 April 2026 | Oceania Championships | Apia, Samoa | |
| Total | 135 kg | Ulina Tinaiadivila Sagone | 30 April 2026 | Oceania Championships | Apia, Samoa | |
77 kg
| Snatch | | | | | | |
| Clean & Jerk | | | | | | |
| Total | | | | | | |
86 kg
| Snatch | | | | | | |
| Clean & Jerk | | | | | | |
| Total | | | | | | |
+86 kg
| Snatch | | | | | | |
| Clean & Jerk | | | | | | |
| Total | | | | | | |

== Historical records ==
=== Men (2018–2025) ===
| Event | Record | Athlete | Date | Meet | Place | Ref |
55 kg
| Snatch | 82 kg | Eroni Talemanigau Vuratu | 20 June 2022 | Pacific Mini Games | Saipan, Northern Mariana Islands | |
| Clean & Jerk | 105 kg | Eroni Talemanigau Vuratu | 20 June 2022 | Pacific Mini Games | Saipan, Northern Mariana Islands | |
| Total | 187 kg | Eroni Talemanigau Vuratu | 20 June 2022 | Pacific Mini Games | Saipan, Northern Mariana Islands | |
61 kg
| Snatch | 80 kg | T. Wakanibua Apakuki | 20 June 2022 | Pacific Mini Games | Saipan, Northern Mariana Islands | |
| Clean & Jerk | 107 kg | T. Wakanibua Apakuki | 20 June 2022 | Pacific Mini Games | Saipan, Northern Mariana Islands | |
| Total | 187 kg | T. Wakanibua Apakuki | 20 June 2022 | Pacific Mini Games | Saipan, Northern Mariana Islands | |
67 kg
| Snatch | 86 kg | Daniel Zachariah Shaw | 21 June 2022 | Pacific Mini Games | Saipan, Northern Mariana Islands | |
| Clean & Jerk | 115 kg | Daniel Zachariah Shaw | 21 June 2022 | Pacific Mini Games | Saipan, Northern Mariana Islands | |
| Total | 201 kg | Daniel Zachariah Shaw | 21 June 2022 | Pacific Mini Games | Saipan, Northern Mariana Islands | |
73 kg
| Snatch | 125 kg | Nehemiah Elder | 22 February 2024 | Oceania Junior & Youth Championships | Auckland, New Zealand | |
| Clean & Jerk | 137 kg | Nehemiah Elder | 22 February 2024 | Oceania Junior & Youth Championships | Auckland, New Zealand | |
| Total | 262 kg | Nehemiah Elder | 22 February 2024 | Oceania Junior & Youth Championships | Auckland, New Zealand | |
81 kg
| Snatch | 120 kg | Patrick Veidreyaki | 21 June 2022 | Pacific Mini Games | Saipan, Northern Mariana Islands | |
| Clean & Jerk | 152 kg | Patrick Veidreyaki | 21 June 2022 | Pacific Mini Games | Saipan, Northern Mariana Islands | |
| Total | 272 kg | Patrick Veidreyaki | 21 June 2022 | Pacific Mini Games | Saipan, Northern Mariana Islands | |
89 kg
| Snatch | 152 kg | Nehemiah Elder | 3 May 2025 | World Youth Championships | Lima, Peru | |
| Clean & Jerk | 180 kg | Nehemiah Elder | 3 May 2025 | World Youth Championships | Lima, Peru | |
| Total | 332 kg | Nehemiah Elder | 3 May 2025 | World Youth Championships | Lima, Peru | |
96 kg
| Snatch | 155 kg | Taniela Rainibogi | 2 August 2022 | Commonwealth Games | Marston Green, United Kingdom | |
| Clean & Jerk | 188 kg | Taniela Rainibogi | 2 August 2022 | Commonwealth Games | Marston Green, United Kingdom | |
| Total | 343 kg | Taniela Rainibogi | 2 August 2022 | Commonwealth Games | Marston Green, United Kingdom | |
102 kg
| Snatch | 162 kg | Taniela Rainibogi | 8 April 2024 | World Cup | Phuket, Thailand | |
| Clean & Jerk | 202 kg | Taniela Rainibogi | 8 April 2024 | World Cup | Phuket, Thailand | |
| Total | 364 kg | Taniela Rainibogi | 8 April 2024 | World Cup | Phuket, Thailand | |
109 kg
| Snatch | 170 kg | Taniela Rainibogi | 14 December 2023 | IWF Grand Prix | Doha, Qatar | |
| Clean & Jerk | 210 kg | Taniela Rainibogi | 14 December 2023 | IWF Grand Prix | Doha, Qatar | |
| Total | 380 kg | Taniela Rainibogi | 14 December 2023 | IWF Grand Prix | Doha, Qatar | |
+109 kg
| Snatch | | | | | | |
| Clean & Jerk | | | | | | |
| Total | | | | | | |

=== Women (2018–2025) ===
| Event | Record | Athlete | Date | Meet | Place | Ref |
45 kg
| Snatch | | | | | | |
| Clean & Jerk | | | | | | |
| Total | | | | | | |
49 kg
| Snatch | | | | | | |
| Clean & Jerk | | | | | | |
| Total | | | | | | |
55 kg
| Snatch | 57 kg | Marian Vira | 20 June 2022 | Pacific Mini Games | Saipan, Northern Mariana Islands | |
| Clean & Jerk | | | | | | |
| Total | | | | | | |
59 kg
| Snatch | 67 kg | Aluwesi Aditaroleva | 21 June 2022 | Pacific Mini Games | Saipan, Northern Mariana Islands | |
| Clean & Jerk | 85 kg | Aluwesi Aditaroleva | 21 June 2022 | Pacific Mini Games | Saipan, Northern Mariana Islands | |
| Total | 152 kg | Aluwesi Aditaroleva | 21 June 2022 | Pacific Mini Games | Saipan, Northern Mariana Islands | |
64 kg
| Snatch | | | | | | |
| Clean & Jerk | | | | | | |
| Total | | | | | | |
71 kg
| Snatch | 67 kg | Miriama Taletawa | 21 June 2022 | Pacific Mini Games | Saipan, Northern Mariana Islands | |
| Clean & Jerk | 92 kg | Miriama Taletawa | 21 June 2022 | Pacific Mini Games | Saipan, Northern Mariana Islands | |
| Total | 159 kg | Miriama Taletawa | 21 June 2022 | Pacific Mini Games | Saipan, Northern Mariana Islands | |
76 kg
| Snatch | 95 kg | Apolonia Vaivai | 22 June 2022 | Pacific Mini Games | Saipan, Northern Mariana Islands | |
| Clean & Jerk | 111 kg | Apolonia Vaivai | 22 June 2022 | Pacific Mini Games | Saipan, Northern Mariana Islands | |
| Total | 206 kg | Apolonia Vaivai | 22 June 2022 | Pacific Mini Games | Saipan, Northern Mariana Islands | |
81 kg
| Snatch | 77 kg | Makare Tavanavanua | 23 November 2023 | Pacific Games | Honiara, Solomon Islands | |
| Clean & Jerk | 95 kg | Makare Tavanavanua | 23 November 2023 | Pacific Games | Honiara, Solomon Islands | |
| Total | 172 kg | Makare Tavanavanua | 23 November 2023 | Pacific Games | Honiara, Solomon Islands | |
87 kg
| Snatch | | | | | | |
| Clean & Jerk | | | | | | |
| Total | | | | | | |
+87 kg
| Snatch | 85 kg | Helen Seipua | 3 August 2022 | Commonwealth Games | Marston Green, United Kingdom | |
| Clean & Jerk | 108 kg | Helen Seipua | 3 August 2022 | Commonwealth Games | Marston Green, United Kingdom | |
| Total | 193 kg | Helen Seipua | 3 August 2022 | Commonwealth Games | Marston Green, United Kingdom | |

== Historical records ==
=== Men (1998–2018) ===
| Event | Record | Athlete | Date | Meet | Place | Ref |
56 kg
| Snatch | 109 kg | Manueli Tulo | 5 December 2017 | Pacific Mini Games | Port Vila, Vanuatu | |
| Clean & Jerk | 135 kg | Manueli Tulo | 5 April 2018 | Commonwealth Games | Gold Coast, Australia | |
| Total | 239 kg | Manueli Tulo | 5 April 2018 | Commonwealth Games | Gold Coast, Australia | |
62 kg
| Snatch | 113 kg | Poama Qaqa | 5 April 2018 | Commonwealth Games | Gold Coast, Australia | |
| Clean & Jerk | 142 kg | Poama Qaqa | 5 April 2018 | Commonwealth Games | Gold Coast, Australia | |
| Total | 255 kg | Poama Qaqa | 5 April 2018 | Commonwealth Games | Gold Coast, Australia | |
69 kg
| Snatch | | | | | | |
| Clean & Jerk | | | | | | |
| Total | | | | | | |
77 kg
| Snatch | 115 kg | Tevita Tawai | 27 July 2014 | Commonwealth Games | Glasgow, United Kingdom | |
| Clean & Jerk | 165 kg | Tevita Tawai | 27 July 2014 | Commonwealth Games | Glasgow, United Kingdom | |
| Total | 280 kg | Tevita Tawai | 27 July 2014 | Commonwealth Games | Glasgow, United Kingdom | |
85 kg
| Snatch | 140 kg | Taniela Rainibogi | 7 April 2018 | Commonwealth Games | Gold Coast, Australia | |
| Clean & Jerk | 173 kg | Taniela Rainibogi | 7 April 2018 | Commonwealth Games | Gold Coast, Australia | |
| Total | 313 kg | Taniela Rainibogi | 7 April 2018 | Commonwealth Games | Gold Coast, Australia | |
94 kg
| Snatch | | | | | | |
| Clean & Jerk | | | | | | |
| Total | | | | | | |
105 kg
| Snatch | | | | | | |
| Clean & Jerk | | | | | | |
| Total | | | | | | |
+105 kg
| Snatch | | | | | | |
| Clean & Jerk | | | | | | |
| Total | | | | | | |

=== Women (1998–2018) ===
| Event | Record | Athlete | Date | Meet | Place | Ref |
48 kg
| Snatch | 60 kg | Seruwaia Malani | 5 April 2018 | Commonwealth Games | Gold Coast, Australia | |
| Clean & Jerk | 76 kg | Seruwaia Malani | 5 April 2018 | Commonwealth Games | Gold Coast, Australia | |
| Total | 136 kg | Seruwaia Malani | 5 April 2018 | Commonwealth Games | Gold Coast, Australia | |
53 kg
| Snatch | 56 kg | Arieta Mudunavoce | 5 December 2017 | Pacific Mini Games | Port Vila, Vanuatu | |
| Clean & Jerk | 70 kg | Arieta Mudunavoce | 5 December 2017 | Pacific Mini Games | Port Vila, Vanuatu | |
| Total | 126 kg | Arieta Mudunavoce | 5 December 2017 | Pacific Mini Games | Port Vila, Vanuatu | |
58 kg
| Snatch | 68 kg | Maria Mareta | 6 April 2018 | Commonwealth Games | Gold Coast, Australia | |
| Clean and Jerk | 86 kg | Maria Mareta | 6 April 2018 | Commonwealth Games | Gold Coast, Australia | |
| Total | 154 kg | Maria Mareta | 6 April 2018 | Commonwealth Games | Gold Coast, Australia | |
63 kg
| Snatch | 82 kg | Maria Liku | 31 July 2012 | Olympic Games | London, United Kingdom | |
| Clean and Jerk | 100 kg | Maria Liku | 31 July 2012 | Olympic Games | London, United Kingdom | |
| Total | 182 kg | Maria Liku | 31 July 2012 | Olympic Games | London, United Kingdom | |
69 kg
| Snatch | 105 kg | Apolonia Vaivai | 22 September 2017 | Asian Indoor and Martial Arts Games | Ashgabat, Turkmenistan | |
| Clean and Jerk | 126 kg | Apolonia Vaivai | 9 September 2017 | Oceania Championships | Gold Coast, Australia | |
| Total | 227 kg | Apolonia Vaivai | 9 September 2017 | Oceania Championships | Gold Coast, Australia | |
75 kg
| Snatch | 97 kg | Apolonia Vaivai | 29 July 2014 | Commonwealth Games | Glasgow, United Kingdom | |
| Clean and Jerk | 120 kg | Apolonia Vaivai | 6 December 2017 | Pacific Mini Games | Port Vila, Vanuatu | |
| Total | 215 kg | Apolonia Vaivai | 6 December 2017 | Pacific Mini Games | Port Vila, Vanuatu | |
90 kg
| Snatch | 111 kg | Eileen Cikamatana | 24 September 2017 | Asian Indoor and Martial Arts Games | Ashgabat, Turkmenistan | |
| Clean and Jerk | 143 kg | Eileen Cikamatana | 7 December 2017 | Pacific Mini Games | Port Vila, Vanuatu | |
| Total | 253 kg | Eileen Cikamatana | 24 September 2017 | Asian Indoor and Martial Arts Games | Ashgabat, Turkmenistan | |
+90 kg
| Snatch | | | | | | |
| Clean and Jerk | | | | | | |
| Total | | | | | | |
