= Weightlifting at the 2002 Commonwealth Games – Men's +105 kg =

Weightlifting – Men's +105 kg at the 2002 Commonwealth Games
- Venue: Manchester International Convention Centre
- Dates: 3 August 2002
- Competitors: 7 from 6 nations
- Winning total weight: 390

Medalists
| gold medal | Nigel Avery | New Zealand |
| silver medal | Giles Greenwood | England |
| bronze medal | Corran Hocking | Australia |

The Men's +105 kg weightlifting event at the 2002 Commonwealth Games took place at the Manchester International Convention Centre on 3 August 2002. The weightlifter from New Zealand won the gold, with a combined lift of 390 kg.

== Schedule ==
All times are Coordinated Universal Time (UTC)

| Date | Time | Event |
|---|---|---|
| 3 August 2002 | 11:00 | Group A |

== Records ==
Prior to this competition, the existing world, Commonwealth and Games records were as follows:

| World record | Snatch | Hossein Rezazadeh (IRI) | 212.5 kg | Sydney, Australia | 26 September 2000 |
| World record | Clean & Jerk | World Standard | 262.5 kg | – | 1 January 1998 |
| World record | Total | Hossein Rezazadeh (IRI) | 472.5 kg | Sydney, Australia | 26 September 2000 |
| Commonwealth record | Snatch | | | | |
| Commonwealth record | Clean & Jerk | | | | |
| Commonwealth record | Total | | | | |
| Games record | Snatch | Darren Liddel (NZL) | 165.0 kg | Kuala Lumpur, Malaysia | 19 September 1998 |
| Games record | Clean & Jerk | Darren Liddel (NZL) | 202.5 kg | Kuala Lumpur, Malaysia | 19 September 1998 |
| Games record | Total | Darren Liddel (NZL) | 367.5 kg | Kuala Lumpur, Malaysia | 19 September 1998 |

The following records were established during the competition:

| Snatch | 170.0 kg | | GR |
| Snatch | 175.0 kg | Giles Greenwood (ENG) | GR |
| Snatch | 180.0 kg | Giles Greenwood (ENG) | GR |
| Clean & Jerk | 207.5 kg | Nigel Avery (NZL) | GR |
| Clean & Jerk | 210.0 kg | Corran Hocking (AUS) | GR |
| Clean & Jerk | 215.0 kg | Nigel Avery (NZL) | GR |
| Total | 372.5 kg | Giles Greenwood (ENG) | GR |
| Total | 380.0 kg | Giles Greenwood (ENG) | GR |
| Total | 382.5 kg | Nigel Avery (NZL) | GR |
| Total | 387.5 kg | Giles Greenwood (ENG) | GR |
| Total | 390.0 kg | Nigel Avery (NZL) | GR |

== Results ==
| Rank | Athlete | Nation | Group | Body weight | Snatch (kg) | | | | | Clean & Jerk (kg) | | | | | Total |
| Rank | Athlete | Nation | Group | Body weight | 1 | 2 | 3 | Result | Rank | 1 | 2 | 3 | Result | Rank | Total |
|---|---|---|---|---|---|---|---|---|---|---|---|---|---|---|---|
| 1st place, gold medalist(s) | Nigel Avery | New Zealand | A | 124.73 | 170.0 | 175.0 | ~~180.0~~ | 175.0 | 2nd place, silver medalist(s) | 207.5 | 215.0 | – | 215.0 | 1st place, gold medalist(s) | 390.0 |
| 2nd place, silver medalist(s) | Giles Greenwood | England | A | 122.85 | 175.0 | ~~180.0~~ | 180.0 | 180.0 | 1st place, gold medalist(s) | 192.5 | 200.0 | 207.5 | 207.5 | 3rd place, bronze medalist(s) | 387.5 |
| 3rd place, bronze medalist(s) | Corran Hocking | Australia | A | 151.36 | 170.0 | ~~175.0~~ | ~~177.5~~ | 170.0 | 4 | 200.0 | 207.5 | 210.0 | 210.0 | 2nd place, silver medalist(s) | 380.0 |
| 4 | Chris Rae | Australia | A | 142.94 | 170.0 | 175.0 | ~~180.0~~ | 175.0 | 3rd place, bronze medalist(s) | 190.0 | ~~200.0~~ | 200.0 | 200.0 | 4 | 375.0 |
| 5 | Terrance Perdue | Wales | A | 158.56 | 132.5 | 137.5 | ~~140.0~~ | 137.5 | 5 | 170.0 | 177.5 | ~~182.5~~ | 177.5 | 5 | 315.0 |
| 6 | Maamaloa Lolohea | Tonga | A | 125.40 | 125.0 | ~~130.0~~ | 130.0 | 130.0 | 6 | 160.0 | 170.0 | ~~177.5~~ | 170.0 | 6 | 300.0 |
| 7 | Frank Accouche | Seychelles | A | 117.16 | 120.0 | ~~130.0~~ | ~~130.0~~ | 120.0 | 7 | ~~160.0~~ | ~~160.0~~ | 160.0 | 160.0 | 7 | 280.0 |
