= Weightlifting at the 2002 Commonwealth Games – Men's 105 kg =

Weightlifting – Men's 105 kg at the 2002 Commonwealth Games
- Venue: Manchester International Convention Centre
- Dates: 2 August 2002
- Competitors: 11 from 10 nations
- Winning total weight: 375

Medalists
gold medal	Delroy McQueen	England
silver medal	Akos Sandor	Canada
bronze medal	Edmund Yeo	Malaysia

The Men's 105 kg weightlifting event at the 2002 Commonwealth Games took place at the Manchester International Convention Centre on 2 August 2002. The weightlifter from England won the gold, with a combined lift of 375 kg.

== Schedule ==
All times are Coordinated Universal Time (UTC)

Date	Time	Event
2 August 2002	19:00	Group A

== Records ==
Prior to this competition, the existing world, Commonwealth and Games records were as follows:

World record	Snatch	Marcin Dołęga (POL)	198.5 kg	Havířov, Czech Republic	4 June 2002
World record	Clean & Jerk	World Standard	242.5 kg	–	1 January 1998
World record	Total	World Standard	440.0 kg	–	1 January 1998
Commonwealth record	Snatch				
Commonwealth record	Clean & Jerk	Aleksander Karapetyan (AUS)	210.0 kg	Melbourne, Australia	17 March 2002
Commonwealth record	Total	Akos Sandor (CAN)	377.5 kg	Shreveport, United States	16 April 2000
Games record	Snatch	Akos Sandor (CAN)	167.5 kg	Kuala Lumpur, Malaysia	19 September 1998
Games record	Clean & Jerk	Akos Sandor (CAN)	192.5 kg	Kuala Lumpur, Malaysia	19 September 1998
Games record	Total	Akos Sandor (CAN)	360.0 kg	Kuala Lumpur, Malaysia	19 September 1998

The following records were established during the competition:

Clean & Jerk	195.0 kg	Akos Sandor (CAN)	GR
Clean & Jerk	200.0 kg	Delroy McQueen (ENG)	GR
Clean & Jerk	210.0 kg	Delroy McQueen (ENG)	GR
Total	365.0 kg	Delroy McQueen (ENG)	GR
Total	375.0 kg	Delroy McQueen (ENG)	GR

== Results ==
Rank	Athlete	Nation	Group	Body weight	Snatch (kg)					Clean & Jerk (kg)					Total
Rank	Athlete	Nation	Group	Body weight	1	2	3	Result	Rank	1	2	3	Result	Rank	Total
1st place, gold medalist(s)	Delroy McQueen	England	A	101.49	160.0	162.5	165.0	165.0	1st place, gold medalist(s)	200.0	210.0	–	210.0	1st place, gold medalist(s)	375.0
2nd place, silver medalist(s)	Akos Sandor	Canada	A	104.88	~~160.0~~	160.0	165.0	165.0	2nd place, silver medalist(s)	195.0	~~200.0~~	~~200.5~~	195.0	2nd place, silver medalist(s)	360.0
3rd place, bronze medalist(s)	Edmund Yeo	Malaysia	A	97.65	~~145.0~~	145.0	~~150.0~~	145.0	4	160.0	170.0	–	170.0	3rd place, bronze medalist(s)	315.0
4	Angelos Ioannou	Cyprus	A	100.59	~~125.0~~	125.0	130.0	130.0	6	150.0	155.0	160.0	160.0	4	290.0
5	Sam Pera	Cook Islands	A	100.01	115.0	122.5	~~127.5~~	122.5	7	150.0	155.0	~~162.5~~	155.0	6	277.5
6	Albert Abotsi	Ghana	A	94.62	90.0	97.5	~~105.0~~	97.5	9	120.0	127.5	135.0	135.0	7	232.5
7	Rashid Lubega	Uganda	A	103.86	90.0	100.0	~~105.0~~	100.0	8	110.0	130.0	~~135.0~~	130.0	8	230.0
8	Moto Valiana	Niue	A	100.53	90.0	~~95.0~~	95.0	95.0	10	115.0	~~122.5~~	~~122.5~~	115.0	9	210.0
–	Gurbinder Cheema	England	A	104.04	155.0	160.0	~~165.0~~	160.0	3rd place, bronze medalist(s)	~~190.0~~	~~195.0~~	~~195.0~~	–	–	–
–	Stuart Yule	Scotland	A	104.23	135.0	~~140.0~~	–	135.0	5	–	–	–	–	–	–
–	Kamran Majid	Pakistan	A	100.99	~~125.0~~	~~125.0~~	~~125.0~~	–	–	150.0	157.5	~~162.5~~	157.5	5	–
