= Tom-Jaye Waibeiya =

Nauruan weightlifter

Personal information
- Full name: Tom-Jaye Waibeiya
- Born: 17 December 1995 (age 30)
- Weight: 75.84 kg (167.2 lb)

Sport
- Country: Nauru
- Sport: Weightlifting
- Weight class: 77 kg
- Team: National team
- Updated on 19 October 2016

Tom-Jaye Waibeiya (born 17 December 1995) is a Nauruan male weightlifter, who competes in the 77 kg weight category and represents Nauru in international competitions. He participated in the 2014 Commonwealth Games in the 77 kg event.

== Major competitions ==
Year	Venue	Weight	Snatch (kg)				Clean & Jerk (kg)				Total	Rank
Year	Venue	Weight	1	2	3	Rank	1	2	3	Rank	Total	Rank
Commonwealth Games
2014	Glasgow, Scotland	77 kg	100	105	~~110~~	—N/a	140	145	~~150~~	—N/a	250	18
