= List of Singaporean records in Olympic weightlifting =

The following are the records of Singapore in Olympic weightlifting. Records are maintained in each weight class for the snatch lift, clean and jerk lift, and the total for both lifts by the Singapore Weightlifting Federation (SWF).

== Current records ==
=== Men ===
Event	Record	Athlete	Date	Meet	Place	Ref
60 kg
Snatch						
Clean & Jerk						
Total						
65 kg
Snatch						
Clean & Jerk						
Total						
71 kg
Snatch	120 kg	Kester Loy	27 July 2026	Commonwealth Games	Glasgow, United Kingdom	
Clean & Jerk	145 kg	Kester Loy	27 July 2026	Commonwealth Games	Glasgow, United Kingdom	
Total	265 kg	Kester Loy	27 July 2026	Commonwealth Games	Glasgow, United Kingdom	
79 kg
Snatch	136 kg	Yuan Yee Loh	27 July 2026	Commonwealth Games	Glasgow, United Kingdom	
Clean & Jerk	167 kg	Yuan Yee Loh	27 July 2026	Commonwealth Games	Glasgow, United Kingdom	
Total	303 kg	Yuan Yee Loh	27 July 2026	Commonwealth Games	Glasgow, United Kingdom	
88 kg
Snatch	130 kg	Lim Kang Yin	28 July 2026	Commonwealth Games	Glasgow, United Kingdom	
Clean & Jerk	165 kg	Lim Kang Yin	28 July 2026	Commonwealth Games	Glasgow, United Kingdom	
Total	295 kg	Lim Kang Yin	28 July 2026	Commonwealth Games	Glasgow, United Kingdom	
94 kg
Snatch	140 kg	Lim Kang Yin	16 December 2025	SEA Games	Chonburi, Thailand	
Clean & Jerk	172 kg	Lim Kang Yin	16 December 2025	SEA Games	Chonburi, Thailand	
Total	312 kg	Lim Kang Yin	16 December 2025	SEA Games	Chonburi, Thailand	
110 kg
Snatch						
Clean & Jerk						
Total						
+110 kg
Snatch						
Clean & Jerk						
Total						

=== Women ===
Event	Record	Athlete	Date	Meet	Place	Ref
48 kg
Snatch						
Clean & Jerk						
Total						
53 kg
Snatch	74 kg	Jiin Linn Chua	27 July 2026	Commonwealth Games	Glasgow, United Kingdom	
Clean & Jerk	94 kg	Jiin Linn Chua	27 July 2026	Commonwealth Games	Glasgow, United Kingdom	
Total	168 kg	Jiin Linn Chua	27 July 2026	Commonwealth Games	Glasgow, United Kingdom	
58 kg
Snatch						
Clean & Jerk						
Total						
63 kg
Snatch						
Clean & Jerk						
Total						
69 kg
Snatch						
Clean & Jerk						
Total						
77 kg
Snatch						
Clean & Jerk						
Total						
86 kg
Snatch						
Clean & Jerk						
Total						
+86 kg
Snatch						
Clean & Jerk						
Total						

== Historical records ==
=== Men (2018–2025) ===
Event	Record	Athlete	Date	Meet	Place	Ref
55 kg
Snatch	81 kg	David Mok	30 July 2022	Commonwealth Games	Marston Green, United Kingdom	
Clean & Jerk	100 kg	David Mok	30 July 2022	Commonwealth Games	Marston Green, United Kingdom	
Total	181 kg	David Mok	30 July 2022	Commonwealth Games	Marston Green, United Kingdom	
61 kg
Snatch	101 kg	David Mok	26 April 2023	EGAT Kings Cup		
Clean & Jerk	120 kg	Muhammad Syahmi Asyrani Suwardi	10 May 2025	Asian Championships	Jiangshan, China	
Total	214 kg	Muhammad Syahmi Asyrani Suwardi	2 November 2024	Singapore Open	Singapore	
67 kg
Snatch	115 kg	Kester Loy	2 November 2024	Singapore Open	Singapore	
Clean & Jerk	135 kg	Kester Loy	2 November 2024	Singapore Open	Singapore	
Total	250 kg	Kester Loy	2 November 2024	Singapore Open	Singapore	
73 kg
Snatch	133 kg	Loh Yuan Yee	5 November 2023	Singaporean Championships	Singapore	
Clean & Jerk	145 kg	Loh Yuan Yee	5 November 2023	Singaporean Championships	Singapore	
Total	278 kg	Loh Yuan Yee	5 November 2023	Singaporean Championships	Singapore	
81 kg
Snatch	142 kg	Loh Yuan Yee	3 June 2023	Singapore International	Singapore	
Clean & Jerk	170 kg	Loh Yuan Yee	12 May 2025	Asian Championships	Jiangshan, China	
Total	311 kg	Loh Yuan Yee	12 May 2025	Asian Championships	Jiangshan, China	
89 kg
Snatch	136 kg	Loh Yuan Yee	3 November 2024	Singapore Open	Singapore	
Clean & Jerk	175 kg	Lim Kang Yin	12 May 2025	Asian Championships	Jiangshan, China	
Total	311 kg	Lim Kang Yin	12 May 2025	Asian Championships	Jiangshan, China	
96 kg
Snatch	136 kg	John Cheah	23 April 2021	Asian Championships	Tashkent, Uzbekistan	
Clean & Jerk	171 kg	Lim Kang Yin	5 November 2023	Singaporean Championships	Singapore	
Total	301 kg	Lim Kang Yin	5 November 2023	Singaporean Championships	Singapore	
102 kg
Snatch	136 kg	Standard				
Clean & Jerk	161 kg	Standard				
Total	297 kg	Standard				
109 kg
Snatch	143 kg	Standard				
Clean & Jerk	170 kg	Standard				
Total	313 kg	Standard				
+109 kg
Snatch	148 kg	Standard				
Clean & Jerk	180 kg	Standard				
Total	328 kg	Standard				

=== Women (2018–2025) ===
Event	Record	Athlete	Date	Meet	Place	Ref
45 kg
Snatch	60 kg	Standard				
Clean & Jerk	73 kg	Standard				
Total	133 kg	Standard				
49 kg
Snatch	64 kg	Standard				
Clean & Jerk	80 kg	Rachel Wee	4 November 2023	Singaporean Championships	Singapore	
Total	141 kg	Standard				
55 kg
Snatch	71 kg	Rachel Wee	2 November 2024	Singapore Open	Singapore	
Clean & Jerk	91 kg	Chua Jiin-Linn	2 November 2024	Singapore Open	Singapore	
Total	158 kg	Chua Jiin-Linn	17 September 2024	Commonwealth Championships	Suva. Fiji	
59 kg
Snatch	75 kg	Nicole Heng	11 May 2025	Asian Championships	Jiangshan, China	
Clean & Jerk	90 kg	Sarah Ang	31 July 2022	Commonwealth Games	Marston Green, United Kingdom	
Total	165 kg	Nicole Heng	11 May 2025	Asian Championships	Jiangshan, China	
64 kg
Snatch	78 kg	Nicole Heng	3 November 2024	Singapore Open	Singapore	
Clean & Jerk	94 kg	Nicole Heng	5 April 2024	World Cup	Phuket, Thailand	
Total	172 kg	Nicole Heng	3 November 2024	Singapore Open	Singapore	
71 kg
Snatch	85 kg	Rachelle Sim	13 May 2025	Asian Championships	Jiangshan, China	
Clean & Jerk	100 kg	Rachelle Sim	13 May 2025	Asian Championships	Jiangshan, China	
Total	185 kg	Rachelle Sim	13 May 2025	Asian Championships	Jiangshan, China	
76 kg
Snatch	78 kg	Standard				
Clean & Jerk	91 kg	Standard				
Total	169 kg	Standard				
81 kg
Snatch	80 kg	Standard				
Clean & Jerk	94 kg	Standard				
Total	174 kg	Standard				
87 kg
Snatch	84 kg	Cassandra Lau	3 November 2024	Singapore Open	Singapore	
Clean & Jerk	101 kg	Cassandra Lau	3 November 2024	Singapore Open	Singapore	
Total	185 kg	Cassandra Lau	3 November 2024	Singapore Open	Singapore	
+87 kg
Snatch	84 kg	Standard				
Clean & Jerk	100 kg	Standard				
Total	184 kg	Standard				
