= Jack Feleti =

Niuean weightlifter

Personal information
- Full name: Jack Feleti Jr
- Born: 24 January 1995 (age 31)
- Height: 170 cm (5 ft 7 in)
- Weight: 76.81 kg (169.3 lb)

Sport
- Country: Niue
- Sport: Weightlifting
- Weight class: 77 kg
- Team: National team
- Updated on 19 October 2016

Jack Feleti Jr (born 24 January 1995) is a Niuean footballer and male weightlifter, competing in the 77 kg category and representing Niue at international competitions. He participated at the 2014 Commonwealth Games in the 77 kg event.

== Major competitions ==
Year	Venue	Weight	Snatch (kg)				Clean & Jerk (kg)				Total	Rank
Year	Venue	Weight	1	2	3	Rank	1	2	3	Rank	Total	Rank
Commonwealth Games
2014	Glasgow, Scotland	77 kg	90	~~94~~	95	—N/a	117	123	~~127~~	—N/a	218	23
