= Abdul Simai =

Tanzanian weightlifter (born 1991)

Personal information
- Full name: Abdul Rahman Said Simai
- Born: 8 March 1991 (age 35)
- Height: 1.71 m (5 ft 7 in)
- Weight: 75.68 kg (166.8 lb)

Sport
- Country: Tanzania
- Sport: Weightlifting
- Weight class: 77 kg
- Team: National team
- Updated on 19 October 2016

Abdul Rahman Said Simai (born 8 March 1991) is a Tanzanian male weightlifter, competing in the 77 kg category and representing Tanzania at international competitions. He participated at the 2014 Commonwealth Games in the 77 kg event, but he did not finish the event.

== Major competitions ==
Year	Venue	Weight	Snatch (kg)				Clean & Jerk (kg)				Total	Rank
Year	Venue	Weight	1	2	3	Rank	1	2	3	Rank	Total	Rank
Commonwealth Games
2014	Glasgow, Scotland	77 kg	~~80~~	~~80~~	~~80~~	—N/a	---	---	---	—N/a	0	---
