= Weightlifting at the Commonwealth Games =

Weightlifting is one of the sports at the quadrennial Commonwealth Games competition. It has been a Commonwealth Games sport since 1950. It is a core sport and must be included in the sporting programme of each edition of the Games.

A total of 17 events were contested at the 2010 Commonwealth Games in Delhi, 8 for men 7 for women and two powerlifting events. The first women's events were introduced in 2002. Between 1990 and 2002 a medal was awarded for each of the snatch and clean and jerk phases and for the combined total, offering as many as 46 gold medals in 2002. Since 2006 medals have only been awarded based on the combined total of both of these phases, as is the case at the Olympics. From 2002 para powerlifting events were contested at the Commonwealth Games and the sports results counted under weightlifting in its first four iterations up to 2014 and from 2018, it was separated from Weightlifting sports category and is considered as a separate individual para-sport.

== Editions ==
Games	Year	Host city	Host county(ies)/province(s)/territory(ies)/state(s)	Host country	Best nation/s
IV	1950	Auckland	Auckland	New Zealand	Malaya
V	1954	Vancouver	British Columbia	Canada	Canada
VI	1958	Cardiff	Glamorganshire	Wales	Singapore
VII	1962	Perth	Western Australia	Australia	England
VIII	1966	Kingston	Surrey	Jamaica	England
IX	1970	Edinburgh	Midlothian	Scotland	England
X	1974	Christchurch	Canterbury	New Zealand	Australia, England
XI	1978	Edmonton	Alberta	Canada	Australia
XII	1982	Brisbane	Queensland	Australia	England
XIII	1986	Edinburgh	Midlothian	Scotland	Australia
XIV	1990	Auckland	Auckland	New Zealand	India
XV	1994	Victoria	British Columbia	Canada	Australia
XVI	1998	Kuala Lumpur	Selangor	Malaysia	Australia
XVII	2002	Manchester	Greater Manchester	England	India
XVIII	2006	Melbourne	Victoria	Australia	Australia
XIX	2010	New Delhi	National Capital Territory of Delhi	India	Nigeria
XX	2014	Glasgow	Lanarkshire & Renfrewshire	Scotland	Nigeria
XXI	2018	Gold Coast	Queensland	Australia	India
XXII	2022	Birmingham	West Midlands	England	India
XXIII	2026	Glasgow	Lanarkshire & Renfrewshire	Scotland	Malaysia

== All-time medal table ==
Para Powerlifting (2002–2014)
Rank	Nation	1st place, gold medalist(s)	2nd place, silver medalist(s)	3rd place, bronze medalist(s)	Total
1	Nigeria	8	4	2	14
2	England	0	2	1	3
3	Australia	0	1	1	2
3	India	0	1	1	2
5	Malaysia	0	0	2	2
6	Kenya	0	0	1	1
Total	—N/a	8	8	8	24

*Note : From 2002 to 2014, Para Powerlifting Medals were awarded under Weightlifting and are included in the medal table. From 2018, It is counted under a separate sport category. See Para powerlifting at the Commonwealth Games

Updated after the 2026 Commonwealth Games

Rank	Nation	Gold	Silver	Bronze	Total
1	Australia	60	53	50	163
2	India	47	57	37	141
3	England	47	53	28	128
4	Canada	33	35	49	117
5	Nigeria	25	24	24	73
6	Malaysia	19	8	19	46
7	New Zealand	13	14	16	43
8	Cameroon	11	2	6	19
9	Nauru	10	11	12	33
10	Wales	9	12	23	44
11	Samoa	7	10	3	20
12	Singapore	4	1	3	8
13	Papua New Guinea	3	4	4	11
14	Scotland	2	5	10	17
15	Pakistan	2	4	3	9
16	Trinidad and Tobago	2	3	4	9
17	Fiji	2	0	3	5
18	South Africa	1	3	5	9
19	Sri Lanka	1	3	4	8
20	Barbados	1	3	0	4
21	Cyprus	1	0	0	1
21	Ghana	1	0	0	1
21	Kiribati	1	0	0	1
24	Guyana	0	2	2	4
25	Seychelles	0	1	1	2
26	Mauritius	0	1	0	1
27	Kenya	0	0	5	5
28	Jamaica	0	0	1	1
28	Saint Vincent and the Grenadines	0	0	1	1
28	Solomon Islands	0	0	1	1
Totals (30 entries)		302	309	314	925

== Games records ==
=== Men ===
Event	Record	Athlete	Nation	Date	Games	Place	Ref
–60 kg
Snatch	121 kg	Rishikanta Singh Chanambam	India	26 July 2026	2026 Games	Glasgow, Scotland	
Clean & Jerk	152 kg	Aniq Kasdan	Malaysia	26 July 2026	2026 Games	Glasgow, Scotland	
Total	273 kg	Aniq Kasdan	Malaysia	26 July 2026	2026 Games	Glasgow, Scotland	
–65 kg
Snatch	133 kg	Aznil Bidin	Malaysia	26 July 2026	2026 Games	Glasgow, Scotland	
Clean & Jerk	166 kg	Aznil Bidin	Malaysia	26 July 2026	2026 Games	Glasgow, Scotland	
Total	299 kg	Aznil Bidin	Malaysia	26 July 2026	2026 Games	Glasgow, Scotland	
–71 kg
Snatch	147 kg	Edidiong Umoafia	Nigeria	27 July 2026	2026 Games	Glasgow, Scotland	
Clean & Jerk	172 kg	John Tafi	Samoa	27 July 2026	2026 Games	Glasgow, Scotland	
Total	319 kg	Edidiong Umoafia	Nigeria	27 July 2026	2026 Games	Glasgow, Scotland	
–79 kg
Snatch	149 kg	Valluri Ajaya Babu	India	27 July 2026	2026 Games	Glasgow, Scotland	
Clean & Jerk	184 kg	Muhammad Erry Hidayat	Malaysia	27 July 2026	2026 Games	Glasgow, Scotland	
Total	331 kg	Muhammad Erry Hidayat	Malaysia	27 July 2026	2026 Games	Glasgow, Scotland	
–88 kg
Snatch	162 kg	Muhammad Hafizuddin Roslin	Malaysia	28 July 2026	2026 Games	Glasgow, Scotland	
Clean & Jerk	188 kg	Standard					
Total	345 kg	Muhammad Hafizuddin Roslin	Malaysia	28 July 2026	2026 Games	Glasgow, Scotland	
–94 kg
Snatch	159 kg	Alex Bellemarre	Canada	29 July 2026	2026 Games	Glasgow, Scotland	
Clean & Jerk	197 kg	Mohamad Syahmi Nor Ghazali	Malaysia	29 July 2026	2026 Games	Glasgow, Scotland	
Total	350 kg	Standard					
–110 kg
Snatch	170 kg	Taniela Rainibogi	Fiji	30 July 2026	2026 Games	Glasgow, Scotland	
Clean & Jerk	208 kg	Taniela Rainibogi	Fiji	30 July 2026	2026 Games	Glasgow, Scotland	
Total	378 kg	Taniela Rainibogi	Fiji	30 July 2026	2026 Games	Glasgow, Scotland	
+110 kg
Snatch	176 kg	Lovepreet Singh	India	30 July 2026	2026 Games	Glasgow, Scotland	
Clean & Jerk	223 kg	David Liti	New Zealand	30 July 2026	2026 Games	Glasgow, Scotland	
Total	389 kg	Standard					

=== Women ===
Event	Record	Athlete	Nation	Date	Games	Place	Ref
–48 kg
Snatch	85 kg	Mirabai Chanu	India	26 July 2026	2026 Games	Glasgow, Scotland	
Clean & Jerk	105 kg	Mirabai Chanu	India	26 July 2026	2026 Games	Glasgow, Scotland	
Total	190 kg	Mirabai Chanu	India	26 July 2026	2026 Games	Glasgow, Scotland	
–53 kg
Snatch	93 kg	Onome Didih	Nigeria	27 July 2026	2026 Games	Glasgow, Scotland	
Clean & Jerk	113 kg	Onome Didih	Nigeria	27 July 2026	2026 Games	Glasgow, Scotland	
Total	206 kg	Onome Didih	Nigeria	27 July 2026	2026 Games	Glasgow, Scotland	
–58 kg
Snatch	103 kg	Rafiatu Lawal	Nigeria	27 July 2026	2026 Games	Glasgow, Scotland	
Clean & Jerk	126 kg	Rafiatu Lawal	Nigeria	27 July 2026	2026 Games	Glasgow, Scotland	
Total	229 kg	Rafiatu Lawal	Nigeria	27 July 2026	2026 Games	Glasgow, Scotland	
–63 kg
Snatch	102 kg	Maude Charron	Canada	28 July 2026	2026 Games	Glasgow, Scotland	
Clean & Jerk	130 kg	Maude Charron	Canada	28 July 2026	2026 Games	Glasgow, Scotland	
Total	232 kg	Maude Charron	Canada	28 July 2026	2026 Games	Glasgow, Scotland	
–69 kg
Snatch	108 kg	Charlotte Simoneau	Canada	28 July 2026	2026 Games	Glasgow, Scotland	
Clean & Jerk	132 kg	Charlotte Simoneau	Canada	28 July 2026	2026 Games	Glasgow, Scotland	
Total	240 kg	Charlotte Simoneau	Canada	28 July 2026	2026 Games	Glasgow, Scotland	
–77 kg
Snatch	107 kg	Seine Stowers	Samoa	29 July 2026	2026 Games	Glasgow, Scotland	
Clean & Jerk	132 kg	Isabella Brown	England	29 July 2026	2026 Games	Glasgow, Scotland	
Total	237 kg	Seine Stowers	Samoa	29 July 2026	2026 Games	Glasgow, Scotland	
–86 kg
Snatch	111 kg	Madias Nzesso	England	29 July 2026	2026 Games	Glasgow, Scotland	
Clean & Jerk	140 kg	Eileen Cikamatana	Australia	29 July 2026	2026 Games	Glasgow, Scotland	
Total	248 kg	Eileen Cikamatana	Australia	29 July 2026	2026 Games	Glasgow, Scotland	
+86 kg
Snatch	122 kg	Standard					
Clean & Jerk	163 kg	Emily Campbell	England	30 July 2026	2026 Games	Glasgow, Scotland	
Total	278 kg	Emily Campbell	England	30 July 2026	2026 Games	Glasgow, Scotland	

== Historical records ==
=== Men (2022) ===
Event	Record	Athlete	Nation	Date	Games	Place	Ref
–55 kg
Snatch	114 kg	Standard					
Clean & Jerk	142 kg	Aniq Kasdan	Malaysia	30 July 2022	2022 Games	Marston Green, England	
Total	255 kg	Standard					
–61 kg
Snatch	127 kg	Muhamad Aznil Bidin	Malaysia	30 July 2022	2022 Games	Marston Green, England	
Clean & Jerk	158 kg	Muhamad Aznil Bidin	Malaysia	30 July 2022	2022 Games	Marston Green, England	
Total	285 kg	Muhamad Aznil Bidin	Malaysia	30 July 2022	2022 Games	Marston Green, England	
–67 kg
Snatch	140 kg	Jeremy Lalrinnunga	India	31 July 2022	2022 Games	Marston Green, England	
Clean & Jerk	166 kg	Vaipava Ioane	Samoa	31 July 2022	2022 Games	Marston Green, England	
Total	300 kg	Jeremy Lalrinnunga	India	31 July 2022	2022 Games	Marston Green, England	
–73 kg
Snatch	143 kg	Achinta Sheuli	India	31 July 2022	2022 Games	Marston Green, England	
Clean & Jerk	172 kg	Standard					
Total	313 kg	Achinta Sheuli	India	31 July 2022	2022 Games	Marston Green, England	
–81 kg
Snatch	147 kg	Standard					
Clean & Jerk	183 kg	Standard					
Total	325 kg	Chris Murray	England	1 August 2022	2022 Games	Marston Green, England	
–96 kg
Snatch	171 kg	Don Opeloge	Samoa	2 August 2022	2022 Games	Marston Green, England	
Clean & Jerk	210 kg	Don Opeloge	Samoa	2 August 2022	2022 Games	Marston Green, England	
Total	381 kg	Don Opeloge	Samoa	2 August 2022	2022 Games	Marston Green, England	
–109 kg
Snatch	166 kg	Standard					
Clean & Jerk	209 kg	Standard					
Total	369 kg	Standard					
+109 kg
Snatch	173 kg	Nooh Dastgir Butt	Pakistan	3 August 2022	2022 Games	Marston Green, England	
Clean & Jerk	232 kg	Nooh Dastgir Butt	Pakistan	3 August 2022	2022 Games	Marston Green, England	
Total	405 kg	Nooh Dastgir Butt	Pakistan	3 August 2022	2022 Games	Marston Green, England	

=== Men (1998–2018) ===
Event	Record	Athlete	Nation	Date	Games	Place	Ref
–56 kg
Snatch	116 kg	Azroy Hazalwafie	Malaysia	5 April 2018	2018 Games	Gold Coast, Australia	
Clean & Jerk	145 kg	Amirul Hamizan Ibrahim	Malaysia	30 July 2002	2002 Games	(England) Manchester, Great Britain	
Total	261 kg	Azroy Hazalwafie	Malaysia	5 April 2018	2018 Games	Gold Coast, Australia	
–62 kg
Snatch	132 kg	Talha Talib	Pakistan	5 April 2018	2018 Games	Gold Coast, Australia	
Clean & Jerk	167 kg	Marcus Stephen	Nauru	16 September 1998	1998 Games	Kuala Lumpur, Malaysia	
Total	292 kg	Marcus Stephen	Nauru	16 September 1998	1998 Games	Kuala Lumpur, Malaysia	
–69 kg
Snatch	146 kg	Katulu Ravi Kumar	India	6 October 2010	2010 Games	Delhi, India	
Clean & Jerk	175 kg	Katulu Ravi Kumar	India	6 October 2010	2010 Games	Delhi, India	
Total	321 kg	Katulu Ravi Kumar	India	6 October 2010	2010 Games	Delhi, India	
–77 kg
Snatch	149 kg	Sathish Sivalingam	India	27 July 2014	2014 Games	(Scotland) Glasgow, Great Britain	
Clean & Jerk	187 kg	Damian Brown	Australia	17 September 1998	1998 Games	Kuala Lumpur, Malaysia	
Total	328 kg	Sathish Sivalingam	India	27 July 2014	2014 Games	(Scotland) Glasgow, Great Britain	
–85 kg
Snatch	157 kg	Stephen Ward	England	18 September 1998	1998 Games	Kuala Lumpur, Malaysia	
Clean & Jerk	193 kg	Shujauddin Malik	Pakistan	20 March 2006	2006 Games	Melbourne, Australia	
Total	347 kg	Leon Griffin	England	18 September 1998	1998 Games	Kuala Lumpur, Malaysia	
–94 kg
Snatch	168 kg	Boady Santavy	Canada	8 April 2018	2018 Games	Gold Coast, Australia	
Clean & Jerk	216 kg	Steven Kari	Papua New Guinea	8 April 2018	2018 Games	Gold Coast, Australia	
Total	370 kg	Kiril Kounev	Australia	18 September 1998	1998 Games	Kuala Lumpur, Malaysia	
–105 kg
Snatch	167 kg	Akos Sandor	Canada	19 September 1998	1998 Games	Kuala Lumpur, Malaysia	
Clean & Jerk	210 kg	Delroy McQueen	England	2 August 2002	2002 Games	(England) Manchester, Great Britain	
Total	375 kg	Delroy McQueen	England	2 August 2002	2002 Games	(England) Manchester, Great Britain	
+105 kg
Snatch	180 kg	Giles Greenwood	England	3 August 2002	2002 Games	(England) Manchester, Great Britain	
Clean & Jerk	229 kg	George Kobaladze	Canada	31 July 2014	2014 Games	(Scotland) Glasgow, Great Britain	
Total	403 kg	David Liti	New Zealand	9 April 2018	2018 Games	Gold Coast, Australia	

=== Women (2022) ===
Event	Record	Athlete	Nation	Date	Games	Place	Ref
–49 kg
Snatch	88 kg	Saikhom Mirabai Chanu	India	30 July 2022	2022 Games	Marston Green, England	
Clean & Jerk	113 kg	Saikhom Mirabai Chanu	India	30 July 2022	2022 Games	Marston Green, England	
Total	201 kg	Saikhom Mirabai Chanu	India	30 July 2022	2022 Games	Marston Green, England	
–55 kg
Snatch	92 kg	Adijat Olarinoye	Nigeria	30 July 2022	2022 Games	Marston Green, England	
Clean & Jerk	116 kg	Bindyarani Sorokhaibam	India	30 July 2022	2022 Games	Marston Green, England	
Total	203 kg	Adijat Olarinoye	Nigeria	30 July 2022	2022 Games	Marston Green, England	
–59 kg
Snatch	90 kg	Rafiatu Lawal	Nigeria	31 July 2022	2022 Games	Marston Green, England	
Clean & Jerk	116 kg	Rafiatu Lawal	Nigeria	31 July 2022	2022 Games	Marston Green, England	
Total	206 kg	Rafiatu Lawal	Nigeria	31 July 2022	2022 Games	Marston Green, England	
–64 kg
Snatch	101 kg	Maude Charron	Canada	1 August 2022	2022 Games	Marston Green, England	
Clean & Jerk	130 kg	Maude Charron	Canada	1 August 2022	2022 Games	Marston Green, England	
Total	231 kg	Maude Charron	Canada	1 August 2022	2022 Games	Marston Green, England	
–71 kg
Snatch	103 kg	Sarah Davies	England	1 August 2022	2022 Games	Marston Green, England	
Clean & Jerk	126 kg	Sarah Davies	England	1 August 2022	2022 Games	Marston Green, England	
Total	229 kg	Sarah Davies	England	1 August 2022	2022 Games	Marston Green, England	
–76 kg
Snatch	101 kg	Standard					
Clean & Jerk	128 kg	Maya Laylor	Canada	2 August 2022	2022 Games	Marston Green, England	
Total	228 kg	Maya Laylor	Canada	2 August 2022	2022 Games	Marston Green, England	
–87 kg
Snatch	110 kg	Eileen Cikamatana	Australia	2 August 2022	2022 Games	Marston Green, England	
Clean & Jerk	145 kg	Eileen Cikamatana	Australia	2 August 2022	2022 Games	Marston Green, England	
Total	255 kg	Eileen Cikamatana	Australia	2 August 2022	2022 Games	Marston Green, England	
+87 kg
Snatch	124 kg	Emily Campbell	England	3 August 2022	2022 Games	Marston Green, England	
Clean & Jerk	162 kg	Emily Campbell	England	3 August 2022	2022 Games	Marston Green, England	
Total	286 kg	Emily Campbell	England	3 August 2022	2022 Games	Marston Green, England	

=== Women (1998–2018) ===
Event	Record	Athlete	Nation	Date	Games	Place	Ref
–48 kg
Snatch	86 kg	Saikhom Mirabai Chanu	India	5 April 2018	2018 Games	Gold Coast, Australia	
Clean & Jerk	110 kg	Saikhom Mirabai Chanu	India	5 April 2018	2018 Games	Gold Coast, Australia	
Total	196 kg	Saikhom Mirabai Chanu	India	5 April 2018	2018 Games	Gold Coast, Australia	
–53 kg
Snatch	84 kg	Khumukcham Sanjita Chanu	India	6 April 2018	2018 Games	Gold Coast, Australia	
Clean & Jerk	111 kg	Dika Toua	Papua New Guinea	25 July 2014	2014 Games	(Scotland) Glasgow, Great Britain	
Total	193 kg	Dika Toua	Papua New Guinea	25 July 2014	2014 Games	(Scotland) Glasgow, Great Britain	
–58 kg
Snatch	93 kg	Michaela Breeze	Wales	26 July 2014	2014 Games	(Scotland) Glasgow, Great Britain	
Clean & Jerk	118 kg	Zoe Smith	England	26 July 2014	2014 Games	(Scotland) Glasgow, Great Britain	
Total	210 kg	Zoe Smith	England	26 July 2014	2014 Games	(Scotland) Glasgow, Great Britain	
–63 kg
Snatch	100 kg	Michaela Breeze	Wales	19 March 2006	2006 Games	Melbourne, Australia	
Clean & Jerk	122 kg	Maude Charron	Canada	7 April 2018	2018 Games	Gold Coast, Australia	
Total	220 kg	Michaela Breeze	Wales	19 March 2006	2006 Games	Melbourne, Australia	
–69 kg
Snatch	105 kg	Christine Girard	Canada	8 October 2010	2010 Games	Delhi, India	
Clean & Jerk	132 kg	Jeane Lassen	Canada	20 March 2006	2006 Games	Melbourne, Australia	
Total	235 kg	Christine Girard	Canada	8 October 2010	2010 Games	Delhi, India	
–75 kg
Snatch	110 kg	Hadiza Zakari	Nigeria	9 October 2010	2010 Games	Delhi, India	
Clean & Jerk	140 kg	Marie-Ève Beauchemin-Nadeau	Canada	29 July 2014	2014 Games	(Scotland) Glasgow, Great Britain	
Total	250 kg	Marie-Ève Beauchemin-Nadeau	Canada	29 July 2014	2014 Games	(Scotland) Glasgow, Great Britain	
–90 kg
Snatch	104 kg	Kaity Fassina	Australia	9 April 2018	2018 Games	Gold Coast, Australia	
Clean & Jerk	130 kg	Eileen Cikamatana	Fiji	9 April 2018	2018 Games	Gold Coast, Australia	
Total	233 kg	Eileen Cikamatana	Fiji	9 April 2018	2018 Games	Gold Coast, Australia	
+90 kg
Snatch	125 kg	Ele Opeloge	Samoa	10 October 2010	2010 Games	Delhi, India	
Clean & Jerk	160 kg	Ele Opeloge	Samoa	10 October 2010	2010 Games	Delhi, India	
Total	285 kg	Ele Opeloge	Samoa	10 October 2010	2010 Games	Delhi, India	
