= Weightlifting at the 2022 Commonwealth Games – Men's +109 kg =

Weightlifting – Men's +109 kg at the 2022 Commonwealth Games
- Venue: National Exhibition Centre
- Dates: 3 August 2022
- Competitors: 9 from 9 nations

Medalists
gold medal	Muhammad Nooh Dastgir Butt	Pakistan
silver medal	David Liti	New Zealand
bronze medal	Gurdeep Singh	India

The Men's +109 kg weightlifting event at the 2022 Commonwealth Games took place at the National Exhibition Centre on 3 August 2022. Muhammad Nooh Dastgir Butt, the weightlifter from Pakistan, won the gold, beating the field that included the Commonwealth Games record holder David Liti, from New Zealand.

In taking home the gold, Butt also set three Commonwealth Games records of his own. The Pakistani weightlifter lifted 173 kg in the snatch category, and 232 kg in clean and jerk, both Commonwealth Games records, for a combined lift of 405 kg, another Commonwealth Games record.

== Records ==
Prior to this competition, the existing world, Commonwealth and Games records were as follows:

World record	Snatch	Lasha Talakhadze (GEO)	225 kg	Tashkent, Uzbekistan	17 December 2021
World record	Clean & Jerk	Lasha Talakhadze (GEO)	267 kg	Tashkent, Uzbekistan	17 December 2021
World record	Total	Lasha Talakhadze (GEO)	492 kg	Tashkent, Uzbekistan	17 December 2021
Commonwealth record	Snatch	David Liti (NZL)	182 kg	Tauranga, New Zealand	15 November 2020
Commonwealth record	Clean & Jerk	David Liti (NZL)	236 kg	Tokyo, Japan	4 August 2021
Commonwealth record	Total	David Liti (NZL)	414 kg	Tauranga, New Zealand	15 November 2020
Games record	Snatch	Commonwealth Games Standard	169 kg		
Games record	Clean & Jerk	Commonwealth Games Standard	217 kg		
Games record	Total	Commonwealth Games Standard	381 kg		

The following records were established during the competition:

Snatch	173 kg	Muhammad Nooh Dastgir Butt (PAK)	GR
Clean & Jerk	232 kg	Muhammad Nooh Dastgir Butt (PAK)	GR
Total	405 kg	Muhammad Nooh Dastgir Butt (PAK)	GR

When the previous records and weight classes were discarded following readjustment, the IWF defined "world standards" as the minimum lifts needed to qualify as world records (WR), CommonWealth Authority defined "Commonwealth standards" and "Commonwealth games standards" as the minimum lifts needed to qualify as Commonwealth record (CR) and Commonwealth games record (GR) in the new weight classes. Wherever World Standard/Commonwealth Standard/Commonwealth Games Standard appear in the list above, no qualified weightlifter has yet lifted the benchmark weights in a sanctioned competition.

== Schedule ==
All times are British Summer Time (UTC+1)

Date	Time	Round
Wednesday 3 August 2022	18:30	Final

== Results ==
Rank	Athlete	Body weight (kg)	Snatch (kg)				Clean & Jerk (kg)				Total
Rank	Athlete	Body weight (kg)	1	2	3	Result	1	2	3	Result	Total
1st place, gold medalist(s)	Muhammad Nooh Dastgir Butt (PAK)	167.76	170	173	~~175~~	173 GR	225	232	-	232 GR	405 GR
2nd place, silver medalist(s)	David Liti (NZL)	182.70	166	170	~~174~~	170	218	224	~~232~~	224	394
3rd place, bronze medalist(s)	Gurdeep Singh (IND)	161.18	~~167~~	167	~~173~~	167	207	~~215~~	223	223	390
4	Petelo Lautusi (SAM)	135.84	160	165	~~170~~	165	201	206	~~215~~	206	371
5	Gordon Shaw (ENG)	139.69	161	167	~~173~~	167	195	~~203~~	~~203~~	195	362
6	Suamili Nanai (AUS)	133.39	160	~~170~~	~~170~~	160	201	~~215~~	~~215~~	201	361
7	Quinn Everett (CAN)	143.60	157	~~162~~	~~164~~	157	201	~~210~~	~~210~~	201	358
8	Ushan Charuka Widana Pathiranage (SRI)	147.56	~~138~~	138	~~145~~	138	~~175~~	175	~~180~~	175	313
―	Nathan Morris (RSA)	129.47	~~135~~	135	141	141	~~170~~	~~170~~	~~170~~	NM	DNF
