= Muhammad Hafizuddin Roslin =

Malaysian weightlifter (born 2004)

Personal information
- Born: 10 December 2004 (age 21) Perlis, Malaysia

Sport
- Country: Malaysia
- Sport: Weightlifting
- Weight class: 88 kg
Medal record
Men's weightlifting
Representing Malaysia
Commonwealth Games
Gold medal – first place	2026 Glasgow	88 kg

Muhammad Hafizuddin Roslin (born 10 December 2004) is a Malaysian former weightlifter. He won a gold medal at the 2026 Commonwealth Games.

== Career ==
In July 2026, Roslin competed at the 2026 Commonwealth Games and won a gold medal in the 88 kg event. He opened the event with 162 kg in the snatch, setting a national record and Commonwealth Games record. He followed it up with 183 kg in the clean and jerk, before finishing with a total lift of 345 kg, also a new Commonwealth Games record.

== Motorcycle accident ==
On 16 November 2026 at 11 PM MYT, Roslin was involved in a near-fatal motorcycle accident that resulted in his right arm being amputated above the elbow the following day after a 7 hour operation. The Malaysian government and National Sports Council responded by paying for his medical expenses and lifelong treatment.
