= Nooh Dastgir Butt =

Pakistani weightlifter (born 1998)

Personal information
- Native name: محمّد نوح دستگیر بٹ
- Full name: Muhammad Nooh Dastgir Butt
- Nationality: Pakistani
- Born: 3 February 1998 (age 28) Gujranwala, Punjab, Pakistan

Sport
- Country: Pakistan
- Sport: Weightlifting
- Event: +109 kg
- Club: South Asian Gym
- Turned pro: 2014
- Coached by: Ghulam Dastgir
Medal record
Men's weightlifting
Representing Pakistan
Event	1st	2nd	3rd
Commonwealth Games	1	–	1
Commonwealth Championships	–	2	2
South Asian Games	2	–	-
Total	3	2	3
Commonwealth Games
Gold medal – first place	2022 Birmingham	+109 kg
Bronze medal – third place	2018 Gold Coast	+105 kg
Commonwealth Championships
Silver medal – second place	2021 Tashkent	+109 kg
Silver medal – second place	2017 Gold Coast	+105 kg
Bronze medal – third place	2016 Penang	+105 kg
Bronze medal – third place	2015 Pune	+105 kg
South Asian Games
Gold medal – first place	2016 Guwahati and Shillong	+105 kg
Gold medal – first place	2019 Kathmandu	+109 kg
- Updated on 4 August 2022

Muhammad Nooh Dastgir Butt (born 3 February 1998) is a Pakistani weightlifter and powerlifter from Gujranwala, Pakistan. He won the gold medal in the +109 kg event at the 2022 Commonwealth Games setting a new Commonwealth Games record.

== Personal life ==
Muhammad Nooh Dastgir Butt was born on February 3, 1998, in Gujranwala. He belongs to a prominent weightlifting family of Kashmiri ancestry. His father Ghulam Dastgir Butt, who also participated in international weightlifting events, coaches Nooh, whose brother Hanzala Dastgir Butt is also a weightlifter who participated in the 2022 Commonwealth Games.

== Career ==
On 3 August 2022, Butt bagged Pakistan's first gold medal at the 2022 Commonwealth Games when he won the men's +109 kg weightlifting event. He lifted 173 kg in the snatch category, and 232 kg in clean and jerk, both Commonwealth Games records, for a combined lift of 405 kg.

Butt had missed out on participation in the 2020 Tokyo Olympics because of a thigh injury that kept him away from the international circuit for over a year. He recovered in time for the 2021 Commonwealth Weightlifting Championships in Tashkent where he took silver, and also qualified for the 2022 Commonwealth Games.

Before his 2022 Commonwealth Games gold, Butt had won the bronze medal in the 105+ kg weightlifting competition in the 2018 Commonwealth Games. After lifting 173 kg in snatch, he successfully lifted 222 kg in his first attempt of clean and jerk to confirm his medal. In an effort to go for the gold, Nooh tried lifting 228 kg in his 2nd and 231 kg in the third attempt but failed to do so.

According to Butt, his failure to lift 231 kg in 2018 "following a mistake" he made really stuck with him. He called that failure the most motivating factor that pushed him to aim higher.

“My father was really upset with me the last time I won bronze, he didn’t talk to me for a while, so my goal is to do better now,” Butt had said a day prior to his weightlifting event at the 2022 Commonwealth Games where he won gold.

Butt also won a bronze medal each at the Commonwealth Games junior championships at Penang, Malaysia in 2016 and at Pune, India in 2015. He lifted 395 kg in junior championships, which is a junior commonwealth record. He clinched the gold medal in the Hercules Columns competition at the Pahlavon Mahmud Strongman Games 2024 in Khiva, Uzbekistan. Nooh participated in this event for the first time along with athletes from 18 other countries.

In October 2024, Butt made his powerlifting debut at the Commonwealth classic and equipped powerlifting championships in Sun City, South Africa. Competing in the +120 kg category, he won the classic title of 860 kg and the equipped title with a total of 850 kg. Across both the events, he won seven gold medals and one bronze. In December 2024, he competed at the Asian Classic Powerlifting Championships in Tashkent, Uzbekistan, where he set an Asian Record in the +120 kg squat with a lift of 400 kg.

In June 2025, Butt won two gold medals at a world strongman championship in Uzbekistan. In June 2026, he won two gold medals at the Sixth International Pehavlon Mahmud Strongmen Games in Khiva, Uzbekistan.

== Awards and recognition ==
Ribbon	Decoration	Country	Year
	Pride of Performance	Pakistan	2022

He was presented a Pride of Performance Award in 2022 by the president of Pakistan.
