= Weightlifting at the 2022 Commonwealth Games – Men's 96 kg =

Weightlifting – Men's 96 kg at the 2022 Commonwealth Games
- Venue: National Exhibition Centre
- Dates: 2 August 2022
- Competitors: 10 from 10 nations
- Winning total weight: 381 GR

Medalists
gold medal	Don Opeloge	Samoa
silver medal	Vikas Thakur	India
bronze medal	Taniela Tuisuva Rainibogi	Fiji

The Men's 96 kg weightlifting event at the 2022 Commonwealth Games took place at the National Exhibition Centre on 2 August 2022. The weightlifter from Samoa won the gold, with a combined lift of 381 kg, a Commonwealth Games record.

== Records ==
Prior to this competition, the existing world, Commonwealth and Games records were as follows:

World record	Snatch	Lesman Paredes (COL)	187 kg	Tashkent, Uzbekistan	14 December 2021
World record	Clean & Jerk	Tao Tian (CHN)	231 kg	Tokyo, Japan	7 July 2019
World record	Total	Sohrab Moradi (IRI)	416 kg	Ashgabat, Turkmenistan	7 November 2018
Commonwealth record	Snatch	Boady Santavy (CAN)	181 kg	Santo Domingo, Dominican Republic	22 April 2021
Commonwealth record	Clean & Jerk	Boady Santavy (CAN)	210 kg	Pattaya, Thailand	24 September 2019
Commonwealth record	Total	Boady Santavy (CAN)	389 kg	Santo Domingo, Dominican Republic	22 April 2021
Games record	Snatch	Commonwealth Games Standard	159 kg		
Games record	Clean & Jerk	Commonwealth Games Standard	199 kg		
Games record	Total	Commonwealth Games Standard	351 kg		

The following records were established during the competition:

Snatch	171 kg	Don Opeloge (SAM)	GR
Clean & Jerk	210 kg	Don Opeloge (SAM)	GR
Total	381 kg	Don Opeloge (SAM)	GR

When the previous records and weight classes were discarded following readjustment, the IWF defined "world standards" as the minimum lifts needed to qualify as world records (WR), CommonWealth Authority defined "Commonwealth standards" and "Commonwealth games standards" as the minimum lifts needed to qualify as Commonwealth record (CR) and Commonwealth games record (GR) in the new weight classes. Wherever World Standard/Commonwealth Standard/Commonwealth Games Standard appear in the list above, no qualified weightlifter has yet lifted the benchmark weights in a sanctioned competition.

== Schedule ==
All times are British Summer Time (UTC+1)

Date	Time	Round
Tuesday 2 August 2022	14:00	Final

== Results ==
Rank	Athlete	Body weight (kg)	Snatch (kg)				Clean & Jerk (kg)				Total
Rank	Athlete	Body weight (kg)	1	2	3	Result	1	2	3	Result	Total
1st place, gold medalist(s)	Don Opeloge (SAM)	95.20	161	166	171	171 GR	200	210	~~220~~	210 GR	381 GR
2nd place, silver medalist(s)	Vikas Thakur (IND)	95.61	149	153	155	155	187	191	~~198~~	191	346
3rd place, bronze medalist(s)	Taniela Tuisuva Rainibogi (FIJ)	95.06	150	155	~~160~~	155	185	188	~~190~~	188	343
4	Denis Joel Essama Owona (CMR)	94.94	145	~~146~~	~~152~~	145	180	~~187~~	~~188~~	180	325
5	Ridge Barredo (AUS)	95.55	~~135~~	136	~~142~~	136	170	180	~~190~~	180	316
6	Ruben Burger (RSA)	95.36	~~138~~	138	~~143~~	138	165	~~171~~	~~175~~	165	303
7	Cédric Coret (MRI)	94.75	130	136	141	141	~~160~~	~~160~~	160	160	301
―	Cyrille Tchatchet II (ENG)	95.90	154	158	~~162~~	158	~~185~~	~~188~~	~~188~~	NM	DNF
―	Antonis Martasidis (CYP)	89.74	150	~~155~~	~~155~~	150	~~191~~	~~194~~	~~194~~	NM	DNF
―	Forrester Osei (GHA)	95.15	~~155~~	~~155~~	~~155~~	NM	―	―	―	―	DNF
―	Boady Santavy (CAN)	DNS									
