= Graeme Avery =

New Zealand businessman

Sir Graeme Avery KNZM
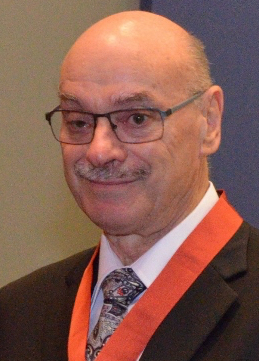
- Avery in 2014
- Born: Graeme Seton Avery; 18 June 1941 (age 85)
- Occupation: Businessman

Sir Graeme Seton Avery KNZM (born 18 June 1941) is a New Zealand businessman and philanthropist. After training as a pharmacist, he founded medical publishing company Adis International in 1963, and it had an annual turnover of $100 million when he sold it to Wolters Kluwer in 1996. The following year, he co-founded Sileni Wine Estates in Hawke's Bay.

As a young man, Avery played first-grade rugby in Sydney, and was a 400-metre runner. He was a co-founder (with Dave Norris) of the North Shore Bays Athletics Club in 1978 (later renamed to North Harbour Bays Athletics Club Inc. in 1997) and in 2002 he joined with Stephen Tindall and Auckland University of Technology (AUT) to establish the $30 million Millennium Institute of Sport and Health as an elite sports academy. In 2009, Avery became chair of the AUT Millennium Ownership Trust.

In 1990, Avery was awarded the New Zealand 1990 Commemoration Medal. In the 2007 Queen's Birthday Honours, he was appointed an Officer of the New Zealand Order of Merit, for services to business and sport, and in the 2014 Queen's Birthday Honours he was promoted to Knight Companion of the New Zealand Order of Merit, also for services to business and sport.

Avery was named New Zealander of the Year in 2003 by Metro magazine, and in 2006 he was conferred an honorary doctorate by AUT. In 2014, Avery was inducted into the New Zealand Business Hall of Fame.

Nigel Avery, a former Olympian and chef de mission for the New Zealand Olympic team at the 2024 Summer Olympics, is his son.
