= Weightlifting at the 2022 Commonwealth Games – Men's 73 kg =

Weightlifting – Men's 73 kg at the 2022 Commonwealth Games
- Venue: National Exhibition Centre
- Dates: 31 July 2022
- Competitors: 12 from 12 nations
- Winning total weight: 313

Medalists
gold medal	Achinta Sheuli	India
silver medal	Erry Hidayat	Malaysia
bronze medal	Shad Darsigny	Canada

The Men's 73 kg weightlifting event at the 2022 Commonwealth Games took place at the National Exhibition Centre on 31 July 2022. The weightlifter from India won the gold, with a combined lift of 313 kg.

== Records ==
Prior to this competition, the existing world, Commonwealth and Games records were as follows:

World record	Snatch	Shi Zhiyong (CHN)	169 kg	Tashkent, Uzbekistan	20 April 2021
World record	Clean & Jerk	Shi Zhiyong (CHN)	198 kg	Pattaya, Thailand	10 December 2019
World record	Total	Shi Zhiyong (CHN)	364 kg	Tokyo, Japan	28 July 2021
Commonwealth record	Snatch	Achinta Sheuli (IND)	143 kg	Tashkent, Uzbekistan	10 December 2021
Commonwealth record	Clean & Jerk	Achinta Sheuli (IND)	173 kg	Tashkent, Uzbekistan	10 December 2021
Commonwealth record	Total	Achinta Sheuli (IND)	316 kg	Tashkent, Uzbekistan	10 December 2021
Games record	Snatch	Commonwealth Games Standard	138 kg		
Games record	Clean & Jerk	Commonwealth Games Standard	172 kg		
Games record	Total	Commonwealth Games Standard	304 kg		

The following records were established during the competition:

Snatch	143 kg	Achinta Sheuli (IND)	GR
Total	313 kg	Achinta Sheuli (IND)	GR

When the previous records and weight classes were discarded following readjustment, the IWF defined "world standards" as the minimum lifts needed to qualify as world records (WR), CommonWealth Authority defined "Commonwealth standards" and "Commonwealth games standards" as the minimum lifts needed to qualify as Commonwealth record (CR) and Commonwealth games record (GR) in the new weight classes. Wherever World Standard/Commonwealth Standard/Commonwealth Games Standard appear in the list above, no qualified weightlifter has yet lifted the benchmark weights in a sanctioned competition.

== Schedule ==
All times are British Summer Time (UTC+1)

Date	Time	Round
Sunday 31 July 2022	18:30	Final

== Results ==
Rank	Athlete	Body weight (kg)	Snatch (kg)				Clean & Jerk (kg)				Total
Rank	Athlete	Body weight (kg)	1	2	3	Result	1	2	3	Result	Total
1st place, gold medalist(s)	Achinta Sheuli (IND)	72.70	137	140	143	143 GR	166	~~170~~	170	170	313 GR
2nd place, silver medalist(s)	Muhammad Erry Hidayat (MAS)	71.98	~~133~~	133	138	138	165	~~176~~	~~176~~	165	303
3rd place, bronze medalist(s)	Shad Darsigny (CAN)	72.71	130	135	~~138~~	135	158	~~163~~	163	163	298
4	John Tafi (SAM)	71.98	127	~~131~~	131	131	~~165~~	165	~~168~~	165	296
5	Brandon Wakeling (AUS)	72.53	122	127	~~132~~	127	163	~~172~~	~~172~~	163	290
6	Jack Oliver (ENG)	72.51	~~131~~	~~131~~	131	131	~~156~~	156	~~164~~	156	287
7	Michael Anthony Farmer (WAL)	72.61	128	~~131~~	~~131~~	128	~~158~~	~~158~~	158	158	286
8	Ezekiel Moses (NRU)	72.70	128	~~130~~	130	130	~~155~~	~~155~~	155	155	285
9	Vester Villalon (NZL)	72.79	123	126	~~129~~	126	155	~~161~~	~~162~~	155	281
10	Jon-antohein Phillips (RSA)	72.27	118	~~123~~	~~125~~	118	158	162	~~165~~	162	280
11	Anthony Masinde (KEN)	72.58	110	~~120~~	~~120~~	110	135	140	~~145~~	140	250
―	Indika Dissanayake (SRI)	72.74	~~129~~	129	133	133	~~160~~	~~161~~	~~167~~	NM	DNF
