= Deulpur =

Deulpur দেউলপুর
- Census Town
- Location in West Bengal, India Deulpur (India)
- Coordinates: 22.60°N 88.14°E
- Country: India
- State: West Bengal
- District: Howrah

Population (2011)
  - Total: 12,618

Languages
  - Official: Bengali, English
- Time zone: UTC+5:30 (IST)
- Vehicle registration: WB
- Lok Sabha constituency: Howrah
- Vidhan Sabha constituency: Panchla
- Website: howrah.gov.in

Deulpur (Bengali: দেউলপুর) is a census town in Panchla CD Block of Howrah Sadar subdivision in Howrah district in the state of West Bengal, India.

== Geography ==
Deuplur is located at 22°36′01″N 88°09′54″E

== Demographics ==
As per 2011 Census of India Beldubi had a total population of 12,618 of which 6,464 were males and 6,154 were females. Population below 6 years was 1,209.

== Notable Personality ==
- Achinta Sheuli, Indian weightlifter who won gold medal in Birmingham 2022 Commonwealth games.
