= Vikas Thakur =

Indian weightlifter (born 1993)

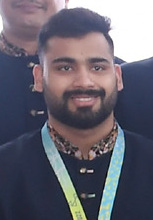
- Thakur in August 2022

Personal information
- Nationality: Indian
- Born: 14 November 1993 (age 32) Hamirpur, Himachal Pradesh, India
- Height: 1.72 m (5 ft 8 in)
- Weight: 96 kg (212 lb)

Sport
- Country: India
- Sport: Weightlifting
- Event: weightlifting
- Coached by: B.S. Medhwan

Achievements and titles
- National finals: 9 Time National champion, India record holder
- Personal best(s): Snatch 159kg, clean jerk 200 kg
Medal record
Men's weightlifting
Representing India
Commonwealth Games
Silver medal – second place	2014 Glasgow	85 kg
Silver medal – second place	2022 Birmingham	96 kg
Bronze medal – third place	2018 Gold Coast	94 kg
Commonwealth Championships
Gold medal – first place	2015 Pune	85 kg
Silver medal – second place	2013 Penang	85 kg
Silver medal – second place	2019 Samoa	96 kg
Bronze medal – third place	2017 Gold Coast	94 kg
Bronze medal – third place	2021 Tashkent	96 kg

Vikas Thakur (born 14 November 1993) is an Indian weightlifter from Hamirpur (Himachal Pradesh) who won silver in the men's 85 kg weight class at the 2014 Commonwealth Games at Glasgow, Scotland. He won a bronze in the 94 kg weight class at the 2018 Commonwealth Games in The Gold Coast. He won the silver medal in the men's 96 kg event at the 2022 Commonwealth Games held in Birmingham, England.
