= Tevita Tawai =

Fijian weightlifter

Personal information
- Full name: Tevita Wanono Tawai
- Born: 26 February 1992 (age 34)
- Weight: 75.85 kg (167.2 lb)

Sport
- Country: Fiji
- Sport: Weightlifting
- Weight class: 77 kg
- Team: National team
- Updated on 19 October 2016

Tevita Wanono Tawai (born 26 February 1992) is a Fijian male weightlifter, competing in the 77 kg category and representing Fiji at international competitions. He won the bronze medal at the 2015 Pacific Games lifting a total of 267 kg. He participated at the 2014 Commonwealth Games in the 77 kg event.

== Major competitions ==
Year	Venue	Weight	Snatch (kg)				Clean & Jerk (kg)				Total	Rank
Year	Venue	Weight	1	2	3	Rank	1	2	3	Rank	Total	Rank
Commonwealth Games
2014	Glasgow, Scotland	77 kg	115	~~120~~	~~120~~	—N/a	160	165	~~170~~	—N/a	280	10
