= John Malcolm Hirst =

British aerobiologist (1921 - 1997)

John Malcolm Hirst DSC FRS (20 April 1921, in Marston Green – 30 December 1997) was a British aerobiologist, known for his invention of the Hirst spore trap, which enabled accurate, routine estimates of spore and pollen concentrations found in the atmosphere. The spore trap was a breakthrough in understanding epidemics of plant disease, identifying airborne allergens, and predicting pollen danger alerts for people with allergic rhinitis. Soon after the invention, many such spore traps were installed by hospitals.

== Biography ==
John Malcolm Hirst had a brother who was about five years older. Their father, who was elected a Fellow of the Royal Geographical Society, died in 1928, thus causing a financial struggle for his widow and their two sons. Both of the sons were educated at Solihull School.

Early in WW II, J. M. Hirst's brother died in a seaplane accident while flying in RAF Coastal Command. In 1940 J. M. Hirst joined the Royal Navy. In summer 1942 he, as a junior officer, joined a flotilla of wooden motor launches for mine clearing and escort service in the Mediterranean. He was awarded the Distinguished Service Cross (D.S.C.) for his service in minesweeping near Trieste. In 1944 he took command of a motor launch, giving assistance off the coast of Yugoslavia to partisan forces. After Germany's surrender, he worked on minesweeping in the eastern North Sea.

In 1946 he matriculated at the University of Reading, where he graduated in 1950 with a bachelor's degree in agricultural botany. During the summer of 1948 he was a voluntary worker at Rothamsted Experimental Station (now called Rothamsted Research), where he worked on aerobiology with Philip Gregory and on viral epidemiology with Leonard Broadbent. On 1 July 1950, Hirst became a staff member at Rothamsted. There he did research, together with Philip Gregory, Frederick Last, and John Stedman, on the epidemiology of Phytophthora infestans. Gregory, the leader of the 4-scientist team, used the cascade impactor for aerobiological research. Hirst thought of a new, more efficient method of aerobiological sampling, which he incorporated into what is now called the "Hirst spore trap". His design was presented to Casella Ltd in 1953 for commercial production. Hirst continually improve his design. Later, Burkard Ltd commercially produced a widely used, more advanced trap using Hirst's improvements. In 1955 Imperial College London awarded Hirst a Ph.D. for his studies on forecasting potato blight.

Hirst's research demonstrated the value of a detailed knowledge of spore dispersal in evaluating control procedures for plant diseases caused by fungi. In 1967 he was appointed head, as successor to Philip Gregory, of Rothamsted's plant pathology department. He continued to do research on the phytopathology of potatoes and cereal crops and also developed an interest in methods and systems of farming. In 1975 he left Rothamsted to become the director of Long Ashton Research Station. His task as director was to convert the research station from an institute focused on horticulture and beverages to an institute devoted mainly to arable agriculture. He retired as director in 1984.

At the University of Reading, J. M. Hirst met Barbara Mary Stokes, whom he married in 1957. She earned a B.Sc. in horticulture, and later an M.Sc. while working at Rothamsted Experimental Station. Upon his death in 1997 he was survived by his widow, their two daughters, and three grandchildren.

== Awards and honours ==
- 1959 — Jacob Eriksson Gold Medal by the International Botanical Congress
- 1970 — Elected a Fellow of the Royal Society
- 1970 — Awarded the Research Medal by the Royal Agricultural Society of England
- 1971 — Elected Chair of the Federation of British Plant Pathologists
- 1972 — Elected President of the British Mycological Society
- 1977 — Elected President of the Association of Applied Biologists
- 1986 — Elected Honorary Member, International Agrobiological Association
- 1988 — Elected Honorary Member, British Society for Plant Pathology
- 1991 — Elected Honorary Member, Indian Aerobiological Association
- 1991–94 — President of the British Aerobiology Federation
- 1992 — Elected Honorary Member, Association of Applied Biologists
- 1995 — Elected Honorary Member, British Aerobiology Federation

== Selected publications ==
- Gregory, P. H.; Hirst, J. M. (1952). "Possible Role of Basidiospores as Air-borne Allergens". Nature. 170 (4323): 414. Bibcode:1952Natur.170..414G. doi:10.1038/170414a0. PMID 12993181. S2CID 4205965.
- Hirst, J. M. (1952). "An Automatic Volumetric Spore Trap". Annals of Applied Biology. 39 (2): 257–265. doi:10.1111/j.1744-7348.1952.tb00904.x.
- Hirst, J.M. (1953). "Changes in atmospheric spore content: Diurnal periodicity and the effects of weather". Transactions of the British Mycological Society. 36 (4): 375–393. doi:10.1016/S0007-1536(53)80034-3.
- Gregory, P. H.; Hirst, J. M. (1957). "The Summer Air-Spora at Rothamsted in 1952". Journal of General Microbiology. 17 (1): 135–152. doi:10.1099/00221287-17-1-135. PMID 13475682.
- Hirst, J.M.; Stedman, O.J. (1962). "The epidemiology of apple scab (Venturia inaequalis (Cke.) Wint.)". Annals of Applied Biology. 50 (3): 525–550. doi:10.1111/j.1744-7348.1962.tb06047.x.
- Hirst, J. M.; Stedman, O. J. (1963). "Dry Liberation of Fungus Spores by Raindrops". Journal of General Microbiology. 33 (2): 335–344. doi:10.1099/00221287-33-2-335. PMID 14121209.
- Hirst, J. M. (1964). "Fungal Epidemics of Plants" (PDF). Nature. 201 (4915): 139–140. Bibcode:1964Natur.201..139H. doi:10.1038/201139a0. S2CID 4252863.
- Hirst, J. M.; Stedman, O. J.; Hogg, W. H. (1967). "Long-distance Spore Transport: Methods of Measurement, Vertical Spore Profiles and the Detection of Immigrant Spores". Journal of General Microbiology. 48 (3): 329–355. doi:10.1099/00221287-48-3-329. PMID 6052628. S2CID 1307116.
- Hide, G. A.; Hirst, J. M.; Salt, G. A. (1968). "Methods of measuring the prevalence of pathogenic fungi on potato tubers". Annals of Applied Biology. 62 (2): 309–318. doi:10.1111/j.1744-7348.1968.tb02826.x.
- Hide, G. A.; Hirst, J. M.; Mundy, E. J. (1969). "The phenology of skin spot (Oospore pustulans Owen &Wakef.) and other fungal diseases of potato tubers". Annals of Applied Biology. 64 (2): 265–279. doi:10.1111/j.1744-7348.1969.tb02877.x.
- Hirst, J. M.; Hide, G. A.; Stedman, O. J.; Griffith, R. L. (1973). "Yield compensation in gappy potato crops and methods to measure effects of fungi pathogenic on seed tubers". Annals of Applied Biology. 73 (2): 143–150. doi:10.1111/j.1744-7348.1973.tb01319.x.
- Hide, G. A.; Hirst, J. M.; Stedman, O. J. (1973). "Effects of black scurf (Rhizoctonia solani) on potatoes". Annals of Applied Biology. 74 (2): 139–148. doi:10.1111/j.1744-7348.1973.tb07733.x.
- Fitt, Bruce D. L.; Walklate, P. J.; McCartney, H. A.; Bainbridge, A.; Creighton, N. P.; Hirst, J. M.; Lacey, M. E.; Legg, B. J. (1986). "A rain tower and wind tunnel for studying the dispersal of plant pathogens by rain and wind". Annals of Applied Biology. 109 (3): 661–671. doi:10.1111/j.1744-7348.1986.tb03224.x.
- Hirst, J. M. (1991). "Aerobiology in plant pathology". Grana. 30: 25–29. doi:10.1080/00173139109427765.
