= Cyrille Tchatchet =

Cameroonian weightlifter (born 1995)

Cyrille Tchatchet OLY
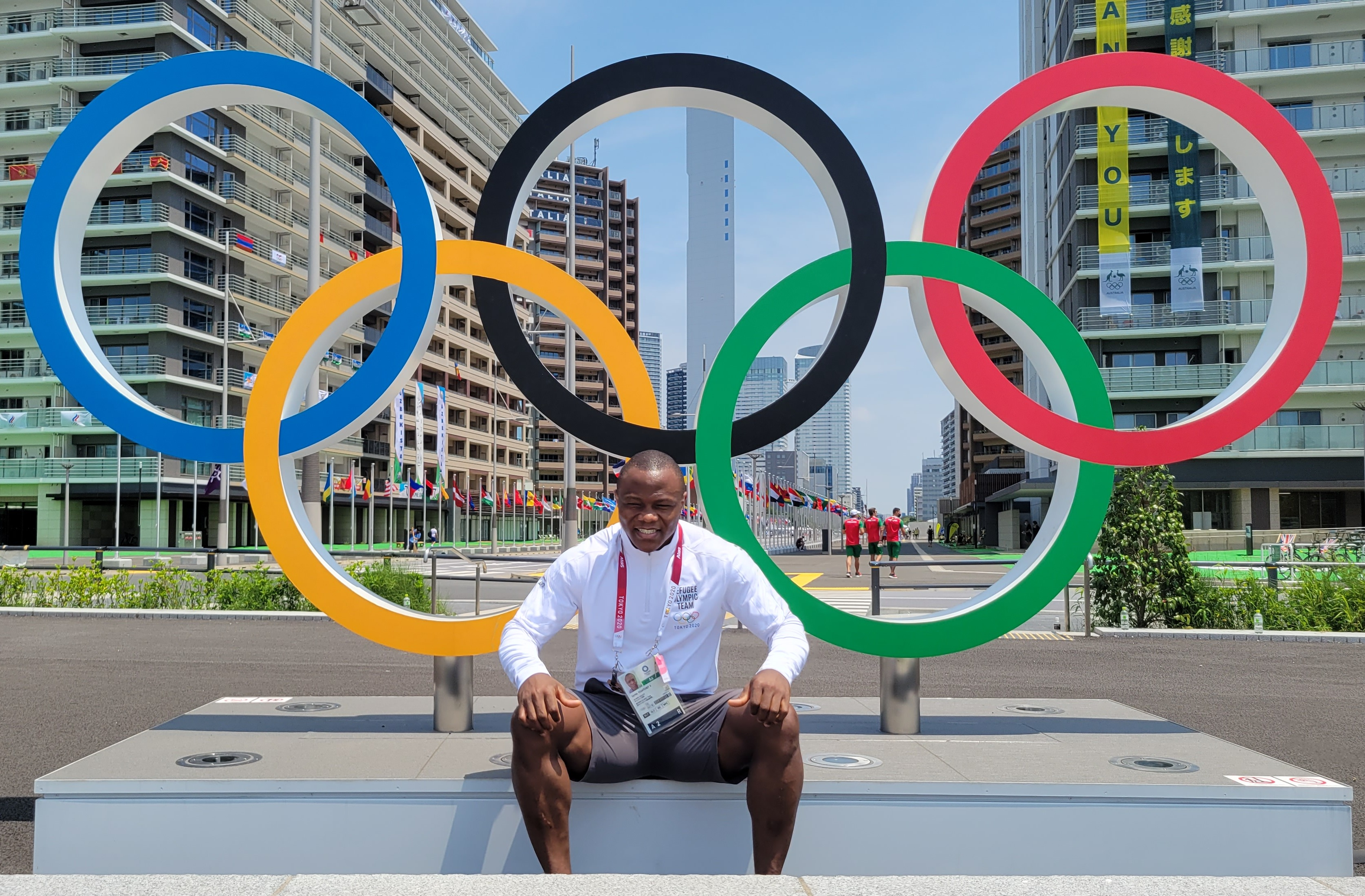
- Tchatchet in the Olympic Village during the 2020 Summer Olympics in Tokyo

Personal information
- Full name: Cyrille Fagat Tchatchet II
- Nationality: Cameroonian / British
- Born: 1 August 1995 (age 31) Yaoundé, Cameroon
- Height: 1.77 m (5 ft 10 in)
- Weight: 110 kg (243 lb)

Sport
- Country: Cameroon; Great Britain
- Sport: Weightlifting
- Event: -96 kg
- Club: Middlesex University weightlifting club

Achievements and titles
- Olympic finals: 10
- National finals: 1
- Personal best: 374 kg
Medal record
Men's weightlifting
Representing England
Commonwealth Weightlifting Championships
Gold medal – first place	2023 Delhi	96 kg
Commonwealth Games
Silver medal – second place	2026 Glasgow	110 kg

Cyrille Fagat Tchatchet II (born 1 August 1995) is a Cameroon-born British weightlifter. He competed in the 85 kg weight category at the 2014 Commonwealth Games for the Cameroon team and finished fifth. Cyrille Fagat Tchatchet II (born 1 August 1995) is a Cameroon-born British weightlifter who competes for England in international competition. He represented the Refugee Olympic Team in weightlifting at the 2020 Summer Olympics in Tokyo, where he finished tenth in the men's 96 kg category. He later represented England at the 2022 and 2026 Commonwealth Games, winning a silver medal in the men's 110 kg category at the 2026 Commonwealth Games in Glasgow. Tchatchet also served as a welfare officer for the Refugee Olympic Team at the 2024 Summer Olympics in Paris. Alongside his sporting career, he works in mental health nursing and has advocated for refugee welfare, athlete welfare and mental health.

He took up weightlifting at the age of 14. He also competed at the British senior weightlifting and under-23 championship 2016 where he was third and first respectively. He won the British, English and BUCS weightlifting championships 2017, 2018 and 2019. In June 2021, he was selected to represent the Refugee Olympic Team in weightlifting.

On the 5th April 2022, Cyrille was cleared by the International Weightlifting Federation to represent British Weight Lifting at international competitions and the England at the Commonwealth Games. His first international competition as a British weightlifter was the 2022 European Weightlifting Championships in Tirana, Albania.

Cyrille was elected to the World Anti Doping Agency Athlete's Council Group 2 for 2025–2027. The election was held virtually via an online voting platform between 10 and 12 December 2024.

Cyrille is a mental health nurse and an accredited cognitive behavioural psychotherapist and works in a community mental health team in the West Midlands. He trains in the local gym after work.

== Early life ==
Cyrille comes from a family of six children and is the 3rd born. His mother separated with his father in the year 2000 and Cyrille and his siblings were looked after by their mother who is a business woman. He attended Government Bilingual Practising High School in Yaoundé and started studying for a degree in geography at the University of Yaounde before stopping to focus full-time on weightlifting training to prepare for the Commonwealth Games.

== Weightlifting career ==
Cyrille took up weightlifting at the age of 14 after seeing the picture of his cousin's father who was a weightlifter representing Cameroon. He therefore started training at the Golden Weightlifting Club before switching to the WOCA Weightlifting Club.

== Personal life ==
Cyrille moved to the United Kingdom in 2014, after defecting from the Cameroonian team during the 2014 Commonwealth Games in Glasgow. He spent two months homeless in Brighton, and contemplated suicide before calling the Samaritans, who talked him out of it.

He obtained refugee status in 2016. He decided to pursue a BSc Mental Health Nursing degree at Middlesex University after experiencing mild depression while claiming asylum, and now works as a mental health nurse.

== Major results ==
Year	Venue	Weight	Snatch (kg)				Clean & Jerk (kg)				Total	Rank
Year	Venue	Weight	1	2	3	Rank	1	2	3	Rank	Total	Rank
Representing England
Commonwealth Games
2026	Glasgow, Scotland	110 kg	158	162	166	2	198	204	208	1	374	2nd place, silver medalist(s)
Commonwealth Weightlifting Championship
2023	Greater Noida, India	96 kg	150	155	~~158~~	2nd place, silver medalist(s)	185	190	192	2nd place, silver medalist(s)	347	1st place, gold medalist(s)
Representing Great Britain
European Championships
2026	(Georgia (country)) Batumi, Georgia	110 kg	~~155~~	155	160	15	195	201	207	11	367	12
Representing the Refugee Olympic Team
Olympic Games
2021	Tokyo, Japan	96 kg	~~153~~	155	~~160~~	13	~~190~~	190	195	10	350	10
Mid-nationality change
British Championships
2022	Derby, United Kingdom	96 kg	145	150	156	1	185	~~191~~	~~191~~	1	341	(gold)
2021	Held virtually	96 kg	150	~~155~~	160	1	~~180~~	190	–	1	350	(gold)
2019	Coventry, United Kingdom	102 kg	145	150	161	1	185	195	~~205~~	1	356	1st place, gold medalist(s)
2017	Coventry, United Kingdom	94 kg	145	~~150~~	~~150~~	1	185	195	~~200~~	1	340	1st place, gold medalist(s)
English Championships
2019	Milton Keynes, United Kingdom	96 kg	141	~~150~~	150	1	~~180~~	180	190	1	340	1st place, gold medalist(s)
BUCS Championships
2019	London, United Kingdom	102 kg	150	155	160	1	~~190~~	190	200	1	360	1st place, gold medalist(s)
Representing Cameroon
Commonwealth Games
2014	Glasgow, Scotland	85 kg	~~135~~	135	140	5	175	~~180~~	~~180~~	5	315	5
African Championships
2013	Casablanca, Morocco	94 kg	~~120~~	~~121~~	122	5	155	~~160~~	~~160~~	5	277	5
