= Taniela Rainibogi =

Fijian weightlifter

Personal information
- Full name: Taniela Tuisuva Rainibogi
- Born: 19 April 1998 (age 28)

Sport
- Country: Fiji
- Sport: Weightlifting
Medal record
Men's Weightlifting
Representing Fiji
Pacific Mini Games
| Bronze medal – third place | 2017 Port Vila | 85 kg |
Oceania Championships
| Silver medal – second place | 2025 Meyuns | 110 kg |
| Silver medal – second place | 2026 Apia | 110 kg |
| Bronze medal – third place | 2017 Gold Coast | 85 kg |
| Bronze medal – third place | 2021 Oceania | 96 kg |
Commonwealth Games
| Gold medal – first place | 2026 Glasgow | 110 kg |
| Bronze medal – third place | 2022 Birmingham | 96 kg |

Taniela Tuisuva Rainibogi (born 19 April 1998) is a Fijian weightlifter. He competed at the 2022 Commonwealth Games, winning the bronze medal in the men's 96 kg event. He also competed at the 2026 Commonwealth Games, winning the gold medal in the men's 110 kg event.
