= Marston Green =

Village in the West Midlands, England

Coordinates: 52.465°N 1.740°W

- Village
- The Marston Green Tavern, seen in 2006

- Location within the West Midlands
- Population: 7,432
- Civil parish: Bickenhill and Marston Green
- Metropolitan borough: Solihull
- Metropolitan county: West Midlands
- Region: West Midlands
- Country: England
- Sovereign state: United Kingdom
- Post town: BIRMINGHAM
- Postcode district: B37, B40
- Dialling code: 0121
- Police: West Midlands
- Fire: West Midlands
- Ambulance: West Midlands
- UK Parliament: Meriden and Solihull East

Marston Green is a village in the civil parish of Bickenhill and Marston Green, in the Metropolitan Borough of Solihull in the English Midlands . It lies within the historic county of Warwickshire. The Parish which includes the village had a population of 7,432 in the 2021 census.

== Geography ==
Marston Green is situated at the eastern fringe of the Birmingham conurbation, adjacent to Birmingham Airport and the National Exhibition Centre. Marston Green railway station, opened in April 1838 by the London and Birmingham Railway, lies on the Birmingham loop of the West Coast Main Line and is served by West Midlands Trains' local services to Birmingham and Coventry, and a smaller number of semi-fast services to Northampton and London Euston.

Features of the area include the Marston Green Tavern, St Leonards Church and Marston Green Infant and Junior schools. It is also home to Marston Green Tennis Club (established 1923) and Marston Green Cricket Club (est. 1926).

== History ==
Marston Green began as a small village surrounded by agricultural land in the estate of Coleshill. At this time, in the 11th century, the village was part of the manor known as Merestone. The village grew into a leafy suburb in the late nineteenth and early twentieth centuries, due to the construction of many detached and semi-detached homes in the 1930s, which were typical of many suburban homes in the area. The growth of homes here was encouraged by the presence of a rail station. Following the expansion of the nearby Birmingham Airport, the construction of the National Exhibition Centre and the local housing estate of Chelmsley Wood, Marston Green has grown largely into a commuter village with many of its residents working in Solihull and Birmingham.

There was a Canadian air force base in Marston Green during the Second World War. Afterwards, the buildings were used as a maternity hospital and then a psychiatric hospital, then were demolished in the 1990s.

The village was in Meriden Rural District until becoming part of Solihull in 1974.

== Notable people ==
- John Malcolm Hirst DSC FRS (1921 – 1997), aerobiologist known for inventing of the Hirst spore trap
- David Willey (born 1947), known as the "Mad Scientist" on the Tonight Show with Jay Leno, born in the village police station, where his father was the policeman

=== Music ===
- Ozzy Osbourne (1948 – 2025), songwriter, media personality, lead singer with heavy metal band Black Sabbath, born at the maternity hospital
- Dave Willetts (born 1952), singer and actor, brought up in Acocks Green.
- Mark Thwaite (born 1965), also known as MGT, musician and guitarist for a number of rock bands and artists
- Miles Hunt (born 1966), singer, songwriter and guitarist; lead singer of the alternative rock band The Wonder Stuff, lived in Marston Green with his family in the 1970s and 1980s.

=== Sport ===
- Frankie Bunn (born 1962), footballer, has played 232 games, including Luton, Hull City and Oldham; holds the record for the most goals scored (6) in one game.
- Terry Fleming (born 1973) football manager, coach, and former footballer who played over 450 games
- Stewart Talbot (born 1973), footballer, has played 356 games, including 137 for Port Vale.
- Terry Cooke (born 1976), footballer who has played 266 games, including Manchester United and Manchester City
