= Giles Greenwood =

English weightlifter

Personal information
- Nationality: English
- Born: 26 January 1971 (age 55) London
- Height: 1.87 m (6 ft 1 1/2 in)
- Weight: 123 kg (271 lb)

Sport
- Country: United Kingdom
- Sport: Weightlifting
- Event: –+105kg
Medal record
Men's Weightlifting
Representing England
Commonwealth Games
Gold medal – first place	2002 Manchester	105+ kg Snatch
Silver medal – second place	1998 Kuala Lumpur	105+ kg Snatch
Silver medal – second place	2002 Manchester	105+ kg Total
Bronze medal – third place	1998 Kuala Lumpur	105+ kg Total
Bronze medal – third place	2002 Manchester	105+ kg Clean & Jerk

Giles Greenwood is a male former weightlifting competitor for England and current weightlifting coach.

== Weightlifting career ==
At the 2002 Commonwealth Games in Manchester he won a gold medal in the 105+ kg snatch, a silver in the combined and a bronze in the clean and jerk. Previously he had competed at both the 1994 Commonwealth Games for England and the 1998 Commonwealth Games in Kuala Lumpur for England where he won a silver medal in the snatch and a bronze medal in the combined.

== Major results ==
Year	Venue	Weight	Snatch (kg)					Clean & Jerk (kg)					Total	Rank
Year	Venue	Weight	1	2	3	Result	Rank	1	2	3	Result	Rank	Total	Rank
Representing Great Britain
World Championships
1999	Athens, Greece	+105 kg	~~160.0~~	~~165.0~~	172.5	172.5	20	200.0	~~207.5~~	~~207.5~~	200.0	30	372.5	22
1995	Guangzhou, China	+108 kg	155.0	162.5	~~167.5~~	162.5	20	185.0	192.5	~~200.0~~	192.5	19	355.0	19
1994	Istanbul, Turkey	108 kg	~~140.0~~	145.0	150.0	150.0	23	175.0	180.0	~~185.0~~	180.0	25	330.0	24
European Championships
2002	Antalya, Turkey	+105 kg	160.0	165.0	—	165.0	13	190.0	197.5	—	197.5	14	362.5	14
2001	Trenčín, Slovakia	+105 kg	155.0	~~160.0~~	160.0	160.0	9	180.0	185.0	~~190.0~~	185.0	9	345.0	8
2000	Sofia, Bulgaria	+105 kg	~~160.0~~	165.0	~~170.0~~	160.0	12	190.0	200.0	~~205.0~~	200.0	13	365.0	12
1999	La Coruña, Spain	+105 kg	150.0	~~160.0~~	~~160.0~~	150.0	15	—	—	—	—	—	—	—
1998	Riesa, Germany	+105 kg	152.5	~~160.0~~	160.0	160.0	15	182.5	190.0	~~195.0~~	190.0	16	350.0	15
1994	Sokolov, Czech Republic	108 kg	—N/a	—N/a	—N/a	152.5	9	—N/a	—N/a	—N/a	182.5	13	335.0	11
Representing England
Commonwealth Games *
2002	Manchester, England	+105 kg	175.0	~~180.0~~	180.0	180.0	1st place, gold medalist(s)	192.5	200.0	207.5	207.5	3rd place, bronze medalist(s)	387.5	2nd place, silver medalist(s)
1998	Kuala Lumpur, Malaysia	+105 kg	~~160.0~~	~~162.5~~	162.5	162.5	2nd place, silver medalist(s)	—N/a	—N/a	—N/a	190.0	4	352.5	3rd place, bronze medalist(s)
1994	Victoria, Canada	+108 kg	—N/a	—N/a	—N/a	—	—	—N/a	—N/a	—N/a	—	—	—	—

* By 2002, medals were awarded in all three categories.
