= Nigel Avery =

New Zealand weightlifter (born 1967)

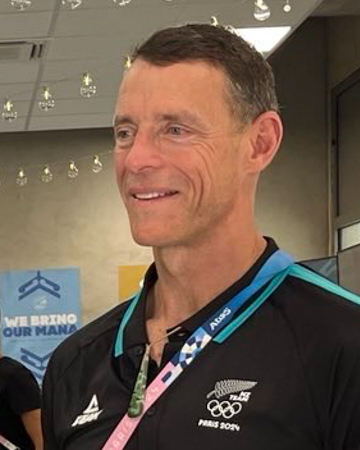
- Avery in 2024

Personal information
- Born: 31 August 1967 (age 58) Auckland, New Zealand
- Height: 1.88 m (6 ft 2 in)
- Weight: 120 kg (260 lb)

Sport
- Country: New Zealand
- Sport: Weightlifting
Medal record
Commonwealth Games
Gold medal – first place	2002 Manchester	105+kg Clean&Jerk
Gold medal – first place	2002 Manchester	105+ kg Total
Silver medal – second place	2002 Manchester	105+ kg Snatch
Bronze medal – third place	1998 Kuala Lumpur	105+ kg Snatch
Bronze medal – third place	1998 Kuala Lumpur	105+ kg Total

Nigel Seton Avery (born 31 August 1967 in Auckland, New Zealand) is a New Zealand former weightlifter.

== Personal life ==
Avery was born on 31 August 1967 in Auckland, New Zealand. His father is Graeme Avery. He is married to former athlete Shelley Avery and they have three daughters.

Avery has appeared on the TV One programme Downsize Me! to show the effect of a high-fat diet on a very fit person.

== Sporting career ==
At the 1998 Commonwealth Games in Kuala Lumpur, he won a bronze medal in the 105+ kg snatch and the 105+ kg combined total.

He went to the 2002 Commonwealth Games in Manchester where he 2 gold medals in the 105+ kg clean and jerk and 105+ kg combined total, and gained a silver medal in the 105+ kg snatch. He was the Closing Ceremony flag bearer for New Zealand.

He competed at the 2000 Olympic Games in Sydney placing 17th in the 105+ kg men.

From 1991 to 1996, he was a member of the New Zealand bobsleigh team.

Avery was the chef de mission for the New Zealand Olympic team at the 2024 Summer Olympics in Paris.
