= Achinta Sheuli =

Indian weightlifter (born 2001)

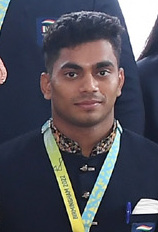
- Sheuli in August 2022

Personal information
- Nationality: Indian
- Born: 24 November 2001 (age 24) Deulpur, Howrah district, West Bengal, India

Sport
- Sport: Weightlifting
- Event: 73 kg
Medal record
Men's weightlifting
Representing India
Commonwealth Games
Gold medal – first place	2022 Birmingham	73 kg
Commonwealth Weightlifting Championships
Gold medal – first place	2019 Apia	73 kg
Gold medal – first place	2021 Tashkent	73 kg
Junior World Weightlifting Championships
Silver medal – second place	2021 Tashkent	73 kg

Achinta Sheuli (born 24 November 2001) is an Indian weightlifter who competes in the 73 kg weight class.

At the 2022 Commonwealth Games, he set a Games record of 313 kg and won gold. He lifted 143 kg in snatch (Games Record & equal to his previous personal best) and 170 kg in clean & jerk.

He won the silver medal at the 2021 Junior World Weightlifting Championships and is a two-time Commonwealth Championships gold medalist.

== Early life ==
Sheuli was born in a lower middle class Bengali family at Deulpur, Panchla in Howrah district. He studied in Deulpur High School. He started weightlifting in 2011. His father Pratik Sheuli was a manual laborer who died in April 2013. His elder brother Alok was also a weightlifter but dropped out to support his career and the family. Achinta helped his mother and brother in their embroidery work that called for precision, even as he was training for weightlifting that called for power.

Sheuli participated in Youth National Games in Haryana and stood in the third position. He won the Junior National level weightlifting tournament in 2013 for 50 kg weight class and got a chance to enter the Army Sports Institute, Pune in 2014.

== Awards ==
- The Times of India TOISA Weightlifter of the Year: 2021
