= Weightlifting at the 2026 Commonwealth Games – Men's 110 kg =

Weightlifting – Men's 110 kg at the 2026 Commonwealth Games
- Venue: Scottish Event Campus
- Dates: 30 July 2026
- Competitors: 11 from 11 nations
- Winning weight: 378 kg

Medalists
| gold medal | Taniela Rainibogi | Fiji |
| silver medal | Cyrille Tchatchet | England |
| bronze medal | Xavier Lusignan | Canada |

The Men's 110 kg weightlifting event at the 2026 Commonwealth Games took place at the SEC Armadillo on 30 July 2026. Fiji's Taniela Rainibogi won the gold medal ahead of Cyrille Tchatchet from England who took silver with Xavier Lusignan of Canada claiming the bronze.

== Qualification ==
A total of 176 weightlifters (88 per gender) qualify to compete at the Games. Nations may earn one quota per weight class, allocated as follows:

- Automatic Qualification – Host CGA (1 per event)
- Direct Qualification – 2025 Commonwealth Weightlifting Champions (1 per event)
- IWF Commonwealth Ranking List (Ranking Period: 01 June 2025 – 18 May 2026) (8 per event)
- Bipartite Invitation (1 per event)

The following lifters qualified in the Men's 110 kg class:

| Means of qualification | Quotas | Qualified |
|---|---|---|
| Host Nation | 1 | Drew Burns (SCO) |
| 2025 Commonwealth Championships | 1 | Taniela Rainibogi (FIJ) |
| IWF Commonwealth Rankings | 6 | Xavier Lusignan (CAN); Jack Opeloge (SAM); Junior Nyabeyeu (CMR); Cyrille Tchatchet (ENG); Ridge Barredo (AUS); Thomas Wilbur (VAN) |
| Bipartite Invitation | 1 | Oliver Dodds (JEY) |
| Reallocation | 2 | Abdul Salim Adjei (GHA); Joshua Uikilifi (TGA) |
| TOTAL | 11 | |

:

== Schedule ==
All times are British Summer Time (UTC+1)

| Date | Time | Round |
|---|---|---|
| 30 July 2026 | 09:30 | Final |

== Competition ==
| Rank | Name | Country | Snatch (kg) | | | | Clean & Jerk (kg) | | | | Total | Notes |
| Rank | Name | Country | 1 | 2 | 3 | Result | 1 | 2 | 3 | Result | Total | Notes |
|---|---|---|---|---|---|---|---|---|---|---|---|---|
| 1st place, gold medalist(s) | Taniela Tuisuva Rainibogi | Fiji | 165 | 170 | ~~170~~ | 170 GR | ~~203~~ | 203 | 208 | 208 GR | 378 | GR |
| 2nd place, silver medalist(s) | Cyrille Tchatchet | England | 158 | 162 | 166 | 166 | 198 | 204 | 208 | 208 | 374 | |
| 3rd place, bronze medalist(s) | Xavier Lusignan | Canada | 159 | ~~163~~ | ~~165~~ | 159 | 197 | ~~206~~ | ~~209~~ | 197 | 356 | |
| 4 | Joshua Uikilifi Jr | Tonga | 141 | ~~146~~ | 146 | 146 | 175 | 180 | 185 | 185 | 331 | |
| 5 | Drew Burns | Scotland | 140 | 143 | 146 | 146 | 168 | 173 | ~~176~~ | 173 | 319 | |
| 6 | Abdul Salim Adjei | Ghana | ~~133~~ | ~~133~~ | 133 | 133 | ~~160~~ | 160 | 165 | 165 | 298 | |
| 7 | Olly Dodds | Jersey | ~~115~~ | 115 | 120 | 120 | ~~140~~ | 140 | ~~145~~ | 140 | 260 | |
| - | Thomas Wilbur | Vanuatu | ~~150~~ | ~~150~~ | ~~150~~ | --- | --- | --- | --- | --- | NM | |
| - | Jack Hitila Opeloge | Samoa | ~~159~~ | 159 | ~~165~~ | 159 | ~~210~~ | ~~210~~ | ~~210~~ | --- | NM | |
| - | Junior Periclex Ngadja Nyabeyeu | Cameroon | ~~156~~ | ~~156~~ | ~~156~~ | --- | --- | --- | --- | --- | NM | |
| - | Ridge Barredo | Australia | ~~155~~ | 155 | ~~162~~ | 155 | ~~190~~ | ~~190~~ | ~~190~~ | --- | NM | |
