= Delroy McQueen =

English weightlifter

Delroy McQueen is a former English weightlifter and powerlifter. Delroy competed in the Commonwealth championships in 2002 in Manchester where he won, setting two new Commonwealth records. He snatched 165 kg and Clean and jerked 210 kg.

Recently Delroy has been looking at powerlifting. He also has set some British national records in the BPC (British powerlifting congress) with a 400 kg squat in the 110 kg class.

== Personal records ==
=== Powerlifting ===
- Squat: 430.0 kg (Multi-Ply suits (Unlimited), any material)
- Bench Press: 220.0 kg (Multi-Ply shirts (Unlimited), any material)
- Deadlift: 380.0 kg (Multi-Ply suits (Unlimited), any material)
- Total (of the above lifts): 1020.0 kg (915.5 raw with wraps total - competition)
- Squat (Powerlifting) Raw (No suit but all other equipment): 365.0 kg

At the 2008 BPC championships, Delroy won the prize for Best lifter (a car).

=== Weightlifting ===
- Snatch: 165.0 kg
- Clean and Jerk: 210.0 kg < All Time British National Overall record.
- Total: 375.0 kg - 2002 Commonwealth Championships - Manchester (CWF)

==== Olympic Exercises Career Highs ====
- Snatch Pull: 175.0 kg
- Clean: 220.0 kg
- Clean Pull: 270.0 kg
- (Full) Olympic Front Squat: 250 - 270.0 kg approx.
- Full Back Squat: 330.0 kg (100% raw) (before his powerlifting career, he did squats just to assist his olympic lifting)
