= Weightlifting at the 2026 Commonwealth Games – Men's 88 kg =

Weightlifting – Men's 88 kg at the 2026 Commonwealth Games
- Venue: SEC Armadillo
- Dates: 28 July 2026
- Competitors: 11 from 11 nations
- Winning weight: 345 kg

Medalists
gold medal	Muhammad Hafizuddin Roslin	Malaysia
silver medal	Cameron McTaggart	New Zealand
bronze medal	Angus Doig	Scotland

The Men's 88 kg weightlifting event at the 2026 Commonwealth Games will take place at the SEC Armadillo on 28 July 2026 The 88 kg is an intermediate class between the traditional light-heavyweight and middle-heavyweight classes of previous Games. Earlier versions of the middle-heavyweight class were 89 kg, but the limits on that class had drifted upwards to the current 94 kg weight division limit. Following these Games, the recognised weight classes for Olympic weightlifting will be reset with divisions at 75 kg and 85 kg. Malaysia's Muhammad Hafizuddin Roslin won the gold medal ahead of Cameron McTaggart from New Zealand who took silver with Angus Doig of Scotland claiming the bronze.

== Qualification ==
A total of 176 weightlifters (88 per gender) qualify to compete at the Games. Nations may earn one quota per weight class, allocated as follows:

- Automatic Qualification – Host CGA (1 per event)
- Direct Qualification – 2025 Commonwealth Weightlifting Champions (1 per event)
- IWF Commonwealth Ranking List (Ranking Period: 01 June 2025 – 18 May 2026) (8 per event)
- Bipartite Invitation (1 per event)

The following lifters qualified in the Men's 88 kg class:

Means of qualification	Quotas	Qualified
Host Nation	1	Angus Doig (SCO)
2025 Commonwealth Championships	1	Braydon Kennedy (CAN)
IWF Commonwealth Rankings	8	~~Sairaj Pardeshi (IND)~~; Muhammad Hafizuddin Roslin (MAS); Cameron McTaggart (NZL); William James Swart (RSA); Ryven Ewing (AUS); Lim Kang Yin (SGP); Christopher Russ (ENG); Dinesh Pandoo (MRI); Rylee Borg (MLT)
Bipartite Invitation	1	Marcincy Cook (NRU)
TOTAL	11	

* Sairaj Pardeshi of India was withdrawn from the event following a positive doping test. Although he is contesting the finding, at the time of the event he is provisionally suspended. His quota was reallocated on rankings to Rylee Borg of Malta.

== Schedule ==
All times are British Summer Time (UTC+1)

Date	Time	Round
28 July 2026	09:30	Final

== Competition ==
Rank	Athlete	Body weight (kg)	Snatch (kg)				Clean & Jerk (kg)				Total
Rank	Athlete	Body weight (kg)	1	2	3	Result	1	2	3	Result	Total
1st place, gold medalist(s)	Muhammad Hafizuddin Roslin (MAS)		~~160~~	160	162	162 GR	180	183	~~185~~	183	345 GR
2nd place, silver medalist(s)	Cameron McTaggart (NZL)		150	154	~~157~~	154	180	184	~~192~~	184	338
3rd place, bronze medalist(s)	Angus Doig (SCO)		135	~~140~~	~~142~~	135	165	170	174	174	309
4	Christopher Russ (ENG)		139	~~142~~	~~143~~	139	165	169	~~173~~	169	308
5	Ryven Ewing (AUS)		~~132~~	132	136	136	~~170~~	170	~~175~~	170	306
6	Dinesh Pandoo (MRI)		~~130~~	130	133	133	171	~~175~~	~~177~~	171	304
7	Lim Kang Yin (SGP)		130	~~136~~	~~142~~	130	165	~~172~~	~~172~~	165	295
8	Rylee Borg (MLT)		125	129	~~132~~	129	~~166~~	166	~~171~~	166	295
9	Marcincy Cook (NRU)		~~125~~	125	130	130	155	160	~~165~~	160	290
–	Braydon Kennedy (CAN)		155	~~160~~	161	161	~~182~~	~~182~~	~~182~~	–	NM
–	William James Swart (RSA)		~~148~~	148	~~153~~	148	~~181~~	~~182~~	~~183~~	–	NM
