= Weightlifting at the 2014 Commonwealth Games – Men's 77 kg =

Weightlifting – Men's 77 kg at the 2014 Commonwealth Games
- Venue: Clyde Auditorium
- Dates: 27 July 2014
- Competitors: 30 from 26 nations
- Winning total weight: 328 kg

Medalists
| gold medal | Sathish Sivalingam | India |
| silver medal | Katulu Ravi Kumar | India |
| bronze medal | Francois Etoundi | Australia |

The Men's 77 kg weightlifting event at the 2014 Commonwealth Games in Glasgow, Scotland, took place on 27 July at 19:30 at the Clyde Auditorium. The weightlifter from India won the gold, with a combined lift of 328 kg.

== Result ==
| Rank | Athlete | Snatch (kg) | | | | Clean & Jerk (kg) | | | | Total |
| Rank | Athlete | 1 | 2 | 3 | Result | 1 | 2 | 3 | Result | Total |
|---|---|---|---|---|---|---|---|---|---|---|
| 1st place, gold medalist(s) | Sathish Sivalingam (IND) | 142 | 146 | 149 | 149 | ~~178~~ | 179 | ~~185~~ | 179 | 328* |
| 2nd place, silver medalist(s) | Katulu Ravi Kumar (IND) | ~~142~~ | 142 | ~~147~~ | 142 | 175 | ~~185~~ | ~~185~~ | 175 | 317 |
| 3rd place, bronze medalist(s) | François Etoundi (AUS) | 137 | ~~140~~ | ~~141~~ | 137 | ~~170~~ | 170 | 177 | 177 | 314 |
| 4 | Jack Oliver (ENG) | 138 | 142 | ~~145~~ | 142 | 171 | ~~174~~ | ~~174~~ | 171 | 313 |
| 5 | Abd Mubin Rahim (MAS) | ~~135~~ | 135 | ~~140~~ | 135 | ~~170~~ | 170 | ~~179~~ | 170 | 305 |
| 6 | Mathew Madsen (NZL) | 125 | ~~128~~ | 128 | 128 | 167 | 172 | ~~177~~ | 172 | 300 |
| 7 | Michel Ngongang (CMR) | ~~132~~ | ~~132~~ | 132 | 132 | ~~167~~ | 167 | ~~171~~ | 167 | 299 |
| 8 | Jean-Marc Beland (CAN) | 131 | 135 | 138 | 138 | 157 | ~~162~~ | ~~162~~ | 157 | 295 |
| 9 | Toua Udia (PNG) | 120 | 125 | ~~129~~ | 125 | 155 | 163 | ~~170~~ | 163 | 288 |
| 10 | Tevita Tawai (FIJ) | 115 | ~~120~~ | ~~120~~ | 115 | 160 | 165 | ~~170~~ | 165 | 280 |
| 11 | Alexandros Amanatidis (CYP) | 125 | ~~130~~ | ~~132~~ | 125 | 155 | ~~160~~ | ~~160~~ | 155 | 280 |
| 12 | Logona Esau (TUV) | 108 | 113 | ~~118~~ | 113 | 142 | 150 | 154 | 154 | 267 |
| 13 | Manoranjan Roy (BAN) | 115 | 120 | ~~125~~ | 120 | 140 | 145 | ~~150~~ | 145 | 265 |
| 14 | Nawendhra Dayan (SRI) | ~~115~~ | 115 | ~~120~~ | 115 | 145 | ~~150~~ | ~~151~~ | 145 | 260 |
| 15 | Cedric Coret (MRI) | ~~105~~ | 105 | 111 | 111 | 140 | 148 | ~~154~~ | 148 | 259 |
| 16 | Brien Best (BAR) | 105 | 110 | 115 | 115 | 135 | 142 | ~~148~~ | 142 | 257 |
| 17 | Taretiita Tabaroua (KIR) | 105 | 110 | ~~118~~ | 110 | 135 | 145 | ~~150~~ | 145 | 255 |
| 18 | Tom-Jaye Waibeiya (NRU) | 100 | 105 | ~~110~~ | 105 | 140 | 145 | ~~150~~ | 145 | 250 |
| 19 | Nii Dodoo (GHA) | 93 | 98 | 101 | 101 | 140 | 145 | ~~150~~ | 145 | 246 |
| 20 | Haider Ali (PAK) | 107 | ~~111~~ | 111 | 111 | 133 | ~~137~~ | ~~137~~ | 133 | 244 |
| 21 | Webstar Lukose (KEN) | 101 | 107 | 110 | 110 | 132 | ~~137~~ | ~~137~~ | 132 | 242 |
| 22 | Christian Amoah (GHA) | 100 | 105 | 110 | 110 | 123 | 128 | ~~132~~ | 128 | 238 |
| 23 | Jack Feleti (NIU) | 90 | ~~94~~ | 95 | 95 | 117 | 123 | ~~127~~ | 123 | 218 |
| 24 | Jonathan Johnson (SLE) | ~~85~~ | 85 | 90 | 90 | 105 | 110 | ~~115~~ | 110 | 200 |
| 25 | Ronald Parker (TCI) | 70 | 75 | 85 | 85 | 100 | ~~115~~ | ~~115~~ | 100 | 185 |
| - | Jean Yanou Ketchanke (CMR) | 135 | 139 | 141 | 141 | ~~170~~ | ~~173~~ | ~~173~~ | —N/a | − |
| - | Toafitu Perive (SAM) | ~~123~~ | ~~123~~ | ~~123~~ | —N/a | | | | | DNF |
| - | Loro Wellkinson Peuji (MAS) | ~~130~~ | ~~130~~ | ~~130~~ | —N/a | | | | | DNF |
| - | Abdul Simai (TAN) | ~~80~~ | ~~80~~ | ~~80~~ | —N/a | | | | | DNF |
| - | Mamdum Seldum (NGR) | 132 | 138 | ~~143~~ | 138 | ~~166~~ | ~~167~~ | —N/a | —N/a | DNF |
