= List of flag bearers for Nauru at the Olympics =

Nauru at the Olympics
- IOC code: NRU
- NOC: Nauru Olympic Committee
- Website: www.oceaniasport.com/nauru
- Medals: Gold 0 Silver 0 Bronze 0 Total 0

Summer appearances
- 1996; 2000; 2004; 2008; 2012; 2016; 2020; 2024

This is a list of flag bearers who have represented Nauru at the Olympics.

Flag bearers carry the national flag of their country at the opening ceremony of the Olympic Games.

#	Event year	Season	Flag bearer	Sport
1	1996	Summer	Marcus Stephen	Weightlifting
2	2000	Summer	Marcus Stephen	Weightlifting
3	2004	Summer	Yukio Peter	Weightlifting
4	2008	Summer	Itte Detenamo	Weightlifting
5	2012	Summer	Itte Detenamo	Weightlifting
6	2016	Summer	Elson Brechtefeld	Weightlifting
7	2020	Summer	Nancy Genzel Abouke	Weightlifting
7	2020	Summer	Jonah Harris	Athletics
8	2024	Summer	Winzar Kakiouea	Athletics

== See also ==
- Nauru at the Olympics
