= Nauru at the Olympics =

- IOC code: NRU
- NOC: Nauru Olympic Committee
- Website: www.oceaniasport.com/nauru
- Medals: Gold 0 Silver 0 Bronze 0 Total 0

Summer appearances
- 1996; 2000; 2004; 2008; 2012; 2016; 2020; 2024; 2028

The Pacific island nation of Nauru first competed in the Summer Olympic Games in the 1996 games in Atlanta. It is the least populated nation to compete in the Olympics as of 2024, and is one of over 50 that have never won a Summer or Winter Olympic medal. The nation is mainly known for its weightlifting tradition and all seven athletes who had competed for Nauru at the Olympics before 2012 were weightlifters. The nation has never participated in any Winter Olympic Games.

With the support of Vinson Detenamo, the Minister of Sport at the time, Nauru's National Olympic Committee was established in 1991. Nauru presented its bid to join the International Olympic Committee and in September 1994 the nation was accepted, clearing the path for participation in the 1996 games.

1996 was not the first time that Nauruan athletes participated in the Olympics, however; after his win in the 1990 Commonwealth Games, weightlifter Marcus Stephen petitioned for citizenship of Samoa to compete in the 1992 Summer Olympics (as Nauru had not yet been accepted into the Olympics). Stephen competed for Nauru at the Olympics in 1996 and 2000, placing 11th in the 62 kg category in 2000. In 2009, he replaced Vinson Detenamo as president of Nauru's National Olympic Committee.

Sheeva Peo took advantage of the debut of women's weightlifting in the 2000 Summer Olympics to became the first woman Olympian from Nauru, placing tenth in the +75 kg superheavyweight class. Sheeva Peo-Cook was appointed General Secretary of the Nauru Weightlifting Federation in 2009, later Vice President.

== Medal tables ==
=== Medals by Summer Games ===
Games	Athletes	Gold	Silver	Bronze	Total	Rank
1996 Atlanta	3	0	0	0	0	–
2000 Sydney	2	0	0	0	0	–
2004 Athens	3	0	0	0	0	–
2008 Beijing	1	0	0	0	0	–
2012 London	2	0	0	0	0	–
2016 Rio de Janeiro	2	0	0	0	0	–
2020 Tokyo	2	0	0	0	0	–
2024 Paris	1	0	0	0	0	–
2028 Los Angeles	future event					
2032 Brisbane	future event					
Total		0	0	0	0	–

== Athletes ==
- Weightlifting
  - Marcus Stephen – 1996, 2000
  - Quincy Detenamo – 1996
  - Gerard Garabwan – 1996
  - Sheeva Peo – 2000
  - Reanna Solomon – 2004
  - Itte Detenamo – 2004, 2008, 2012
  - Yukio Peter – 2004
- Judo
  - Sled Dowabobo – 2012
- Sprinting
  - Jonah Harris - 2020
  - Winzar Kakiouea - 2024

== See also ==
- List of flag bearers for Nauru at the Olympics
