= Nauru at the 2020 Summer Olympics =

- IOC code: NRU
- NOC: Nauru Olympic Committee
- Website: www.oceaniasport.com/nauru

in Tokyo 23 July 2021 – 8 August 2021
- Competitors: 2 in 2 sports
- Flag bearers (opening): Nancy Genzel Abouke; Jonah Harris
- Flag bearer (closing): Nancy Genzel Abouke
- Officials: 4
- Medals: Gold 0 Silver 0 Bronze 0 Total 0

Summer Olympics appearances (overview)
- 1996; 2000; 2004; 2008; 2012; 2016; 2020; 2024

Nauru competed at the 2020 Summer Olympics in Tokyo. Originally scheduled to take place from 24 July to 9 August 2020, the Games were postponed to 23 July to 8 August 2021, due to the COVID-19 pandemic. The country's participation in Tokyo marked its seventh appearance at the Summer Olympics since its debut in 1996.

The Nauruan delegation consisted of seven people, with two athletes: sprinter Jonah Harris and weightlifter Nancy Genzel Abouke, the smallest athlete delegation of a country at those Games. (Note: Tied with Andorra, Bermuda, Brunei, Central African Republic, Dominica, Lesotho, Marshall Islands, Mauritania, Saint Kitts and Nevis, Somalia, South Sudan, and Tuvalu.) Harris qualified through a universality slot by World Athletics, while Abouke qualified through a tripartite invitation quota given by the International Weightlifting Federation. Harris and Abouke were the flagbearers for the opening ceremony, while Abouke solely held the flag at the closing ceremony. Neither athlete medaled, and as of these Games, Nauru had not earned an Olympic medal.

== Background ==
Originally scheduled to take place from 24 July to 9 August 2020, the Games were postponed to 23 July to 8 August 2021, due to the COVID-19 pandemic. This edition of the Games marked the nation's seventh appearance at the Summer Olympics since they debuted at the 1996 Summer Olympics held in Atlanta, Georgia, United States.

=== Travel ===
On 20 July 2021, members of the Nauruan delegation travelled to Tokyo, Japan, the site of the Games, through Nauru Airlines. A coordination with the International Olympic Committee, the Oceania National Olympic Committees of Nauru, Kiribati, Solomon Islands, and Tuvalu, and Nauru Airlines, used the airline to charter two flights with four national delegations. The delegations that went on the flight were Nauru, Kiribati, Solomon Islands, and Tuvalu. The flight took a technical stop in Chuuk State of the Federated States of Micronesia, for travel to Tokyo due to precautions brought on by the COVID-19 pandemic. Delegations from the three other nations were brought to Nauru on 19 July 2021, and the following day saw their departure to Haneda Airport in Tokyo.

=== Delegation ===
The Nauruan delegation was composed of seven people. Officials present were Nauru Olympic Committee president and three-time Olympian Marcus Stephen, chef de mission Gay Uera, and delegation secretaries general Reagan Moses and Sean Oppenheimer. Weightlifting coach and Olympian Quincy Detenamo was the only coach present. The athletes who competed were sprinter Jonah Harris, who competed in the men's 100 meter, and weightlifter Nancy Genzel Abouke, who competed in the women's 76 kg category.

Abouke was the last Nauruan athlete to compete at these Games. No Nauruan athlete has yet earned an Olympic medal.

=== Opening and closing ceremonies ===
The Nauruan delegation marched 124th out of 206 countries in the 2020 Summer Olympics Parade of Nations within the opening ceremony, due to the host's use of the local kana alphabetical system. (Note: Japanese: ナウル, romanized: Nauru) Both athletes, Harris and Abouke, held the flag for the delegation in the ceremony. At the closing ceremony, Abouke was the designated flagbearer for the nation.

== Competitors ==
The following is the list of number of competitors in the Games.

Sport	Men	Women	Total
Athletics	1	0	1
Weightlifting	0	1	1
Total	1	1	2

== Athletics ==
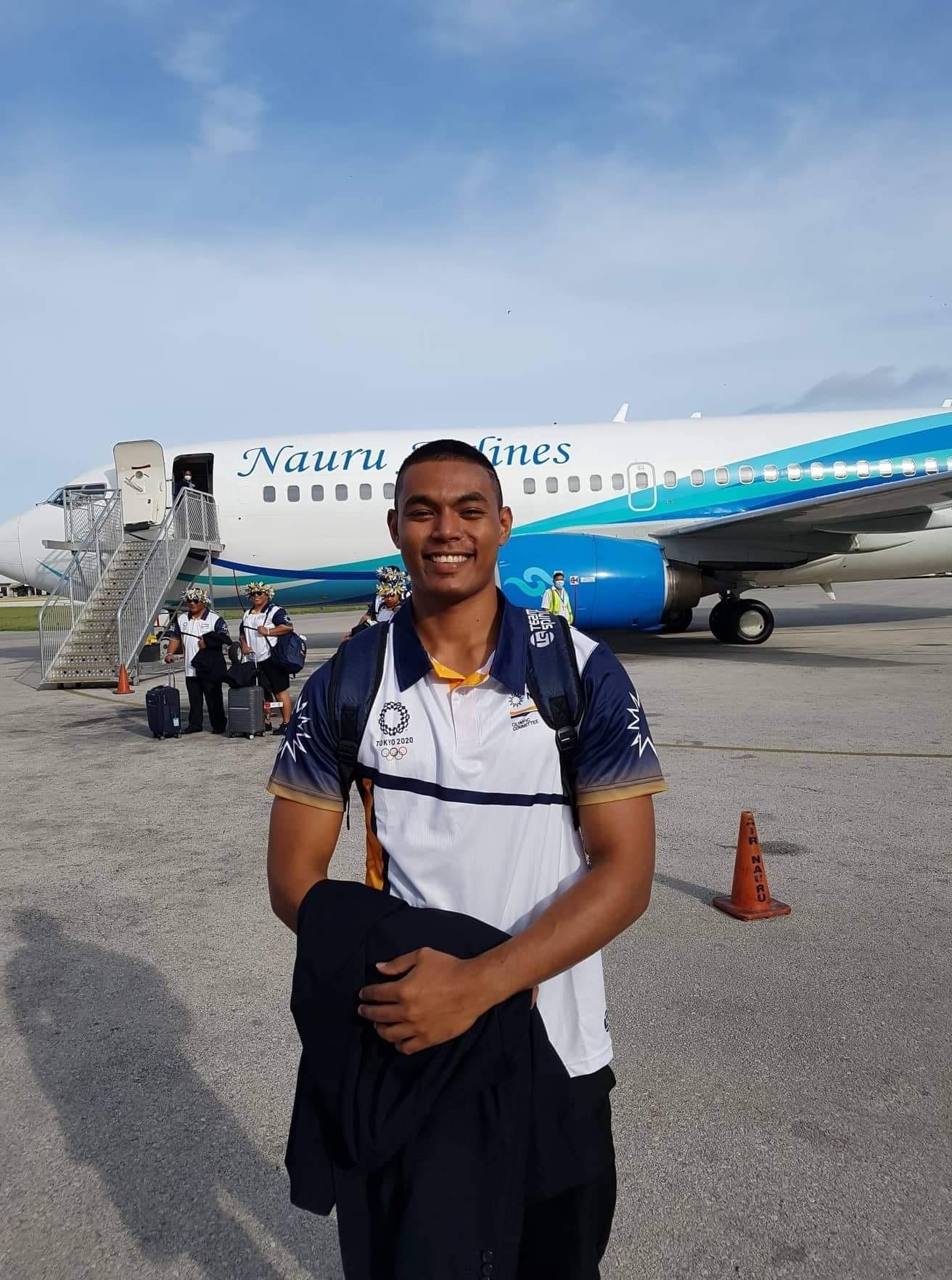
Jonah Harris about to depart for the Tokyo Olympics, boarding a special IOC chartered flight

Nauru received a universality slot from World Athletics to send a male track and field athlete to the Olympics, which allows a National Olympic Committee to send athletes despite not meeting the standard qualification criteria. The nation selected sprinter and national record holder Jonah Harris, who would be the first athletics competitor for Nauru to participate at the Games. He competed in the men's 100 m.

Harris competed in his event on 31 July 2021, running in the third preliminary heat in the fifth lane. He finished with a time of 11.01 seconds, setting a season's best (Note: Information taken from World Athletics profile.) and finishing fifth, but not advancing to the heats.

After he competed in his event, he was interviewed by the BBC, alongside fellow sprinter Karalo Maibuca of Tuvalu, stating that the live television interview would be "good to get small countries like Nauru on the global map and hopefully get recognized."

Key

- Note–Ranks given for track events are within the athlete's heat only
- Q = Qualified for the next round
- q = Qualified for the next round as a fastest loser or, in field events, by position without achieving the qualifying target
- NR = National record
- N/A = Round not applicable for the event
- Bye = Athlete not required to compete in round

Track & road events

Athlete	Event	Preliminaries		Round 1		Semifinal		Final	
Athlete	Event	Result	Rank	Result	Rank	Result	Rank	Result	Rank
Jonah Harris	Men's 100 m	11.01 SB	5	Did not advance					

== Weightlifting ==
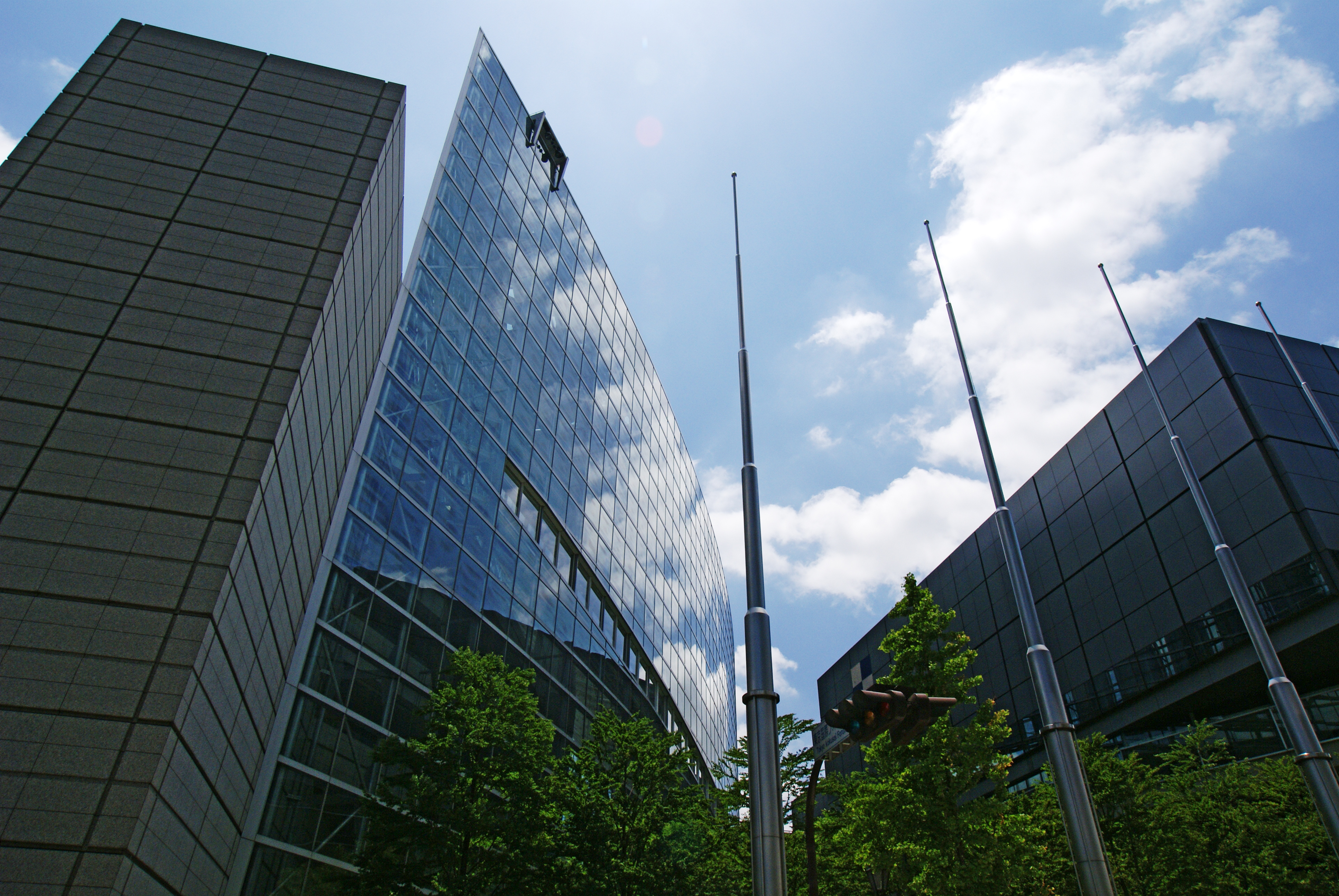
The Tokyo International Forum, where Abouke competed in her event

Nauru's participation in the sport is the ninth consecutive participation ever since its debut in 1996. The nation received one tripartite invitation quota from the International Weightlifting Federation, which allows a National Olympic Committee to send athletes despite not meeting the standard qualification criteria. The nation picked Nancy Genzel Abouke, who would compete in the women's 76 kg category. The lead-up to the Games saw her compete at the 2019 Pacific Games held in Apia, Samoa, and the 2019 Junior World Weightlifting Championships held in Suva, Fiji, when she was aged 15 years old. Aged 18 years old, she was the youngest female lifter and lifter in general to compete at these Games.

Abouke competed in her event on 1 August 2021 at 4:50 p.m., in the B Group. She failed to lift her opening attempt of 88 kilograms, then snatched the same declared weight on her second attempt successfully, and snatched 90 kilograms for her third. She then clean and jerked 108 kilograms for her opening attempt, 113 kilograms for her second, and failed at 117 kilograms on her third and final attempt. She ended up with a 203-kilogram total, placing tenth out of twelve competitors. Abouke commented that she was trying to aim for a 95 kilogram snatch and a 120 kilogram clean and jerk but fell short, citing nervousness, but stated that she would beat the other competitors in future competition.

Another Nauruan weightlifter was also present at the Games, lifter Charisma Amoe-Tarrant who competed for Australia. She represented Nauru in former competitions, most notably getting bronze at the 2018 Junior World Weightlifting Championships in Tashkent, Uzbekistan, the first medal of Nauru at these championships in any edition. She competed in the women's +87 kg category, placing sixth out of fourteen competitors.

Athlete	Event	Snatch		Clean & Jerk		Total	Rank
Athlete	Event	Result	Rank	Result	Rank	Total	Rank
Nancy Genzel Abouke	Women's 76 kg	90	13	113	10	203	10
