= Nauru at the 2024 Summer Olympics =

- IOC code: NRU
- NOC: Nauru Olympic Committee
- Website: www.oceaniasport.com/nauru

in Paris, France 26 July 2024 – 11 August 2024
- Competitors: 1 (1 man and 0 women) in 1 sport
- Flag bearer (opening): Winzar Kakiouea
- Flag bearer (closing): Winzar Kakiouea
- Medals: Gold 0 Silver 0 Bronze 0 Total 0

Summer Olympics appearances (overview)
- 1996; 2000; 2004; 2008; 2012; 2016; 2020; 2024; 2028

Nauru competed at the 2024 Summer Olympics in Paris, France, which were held from 26 July to 11 August 2024. The country's participation in Paris marked its eighth appearance at the Summer Olympics since its debut in 1996. The delegation of the country was composed of four people, with the athlete delegation only being composed of Winzar Kakiouea in athletics. The delegation was supported by a collaboration between the Australian Government and the Australian Olympic Committee, which was made for the development of sport in Pacific nations.

Kakiouea qualified for the games after receiving a universality slot in his event, which allows underrepresented nations to compete and for a National Olympic Committee to send athletes despite not meeting the other qualification criteria. He competed in the men's 100 metres but ran in a time not fast enough to progress further. Thus, Nauru has yet to win an Olympic medal.

== Background ==
The 2024 Summer Olympics were held from July 26 to August 11, 2024, in the city of Paris, France. This edition marked the nation's eighth appearance at the Summer Olympics since its debut at the 1996 Summer Olympics in Atlanta, United States. The nation had never won a medal at the Olympics, with its best performance coming from weightlifter Yukio Peter placing eighth in the men's 69 kg event at the 2004 Summer Olympics in Athens, Greece.

In the lead-up to the 2024 games, the Australian Government announced a collaboration with the Australian Olympic Committee to assist over 230 athletes from 13 Pacific nations (Note: Among the nations that were supported for the games included the Cook Islands, the Federated States of Micronesia, Kiribati, the Marshall Islands, Palau, Papua New Guinea, Samoa, Tonga, Tuvalu, and Vanuatu.) for the 2024 Summer Olympics and 2024 Summer Paralympics, which included Nauru. The collaboration was made to create opportunities for the said nations to compete in international competition, gain access to coaching, and to develop sports diplomacy.

=== Delegation and ceremonies ===
The Nauruan delegation was composed of four people. The sole athlete that competed was sprinter Winzar Kakiouea. Alongside him, his coach, as well as two team officials which included chef de mission Sheba Hubert, attended the games as part of the delegation. The nation's athlete delegation at the games tied with Belize, Liechtenstein, and Somalia for the fewest athletes of a country at the Games. Three of the four members of the delegation arrived at the Olympic Village on 26 July.

The entire Nauruan delegation came in 130th out of the 205 National Olympic Committees in the 2024 Summer Olympics Parade of Nations within the opening ceremony. Kakiouea solely held the flag for the delegation in the parade. At the closing ceremony, he held the flag again.

== Competitors ==
List of Nauruan competitors at the 2024 Summer Olympics
Sport	Men	Women	Total
Athletics	1	0	1
Total	1	0	1

== Athletics ==
=== Qualification and lead-up to the games ===
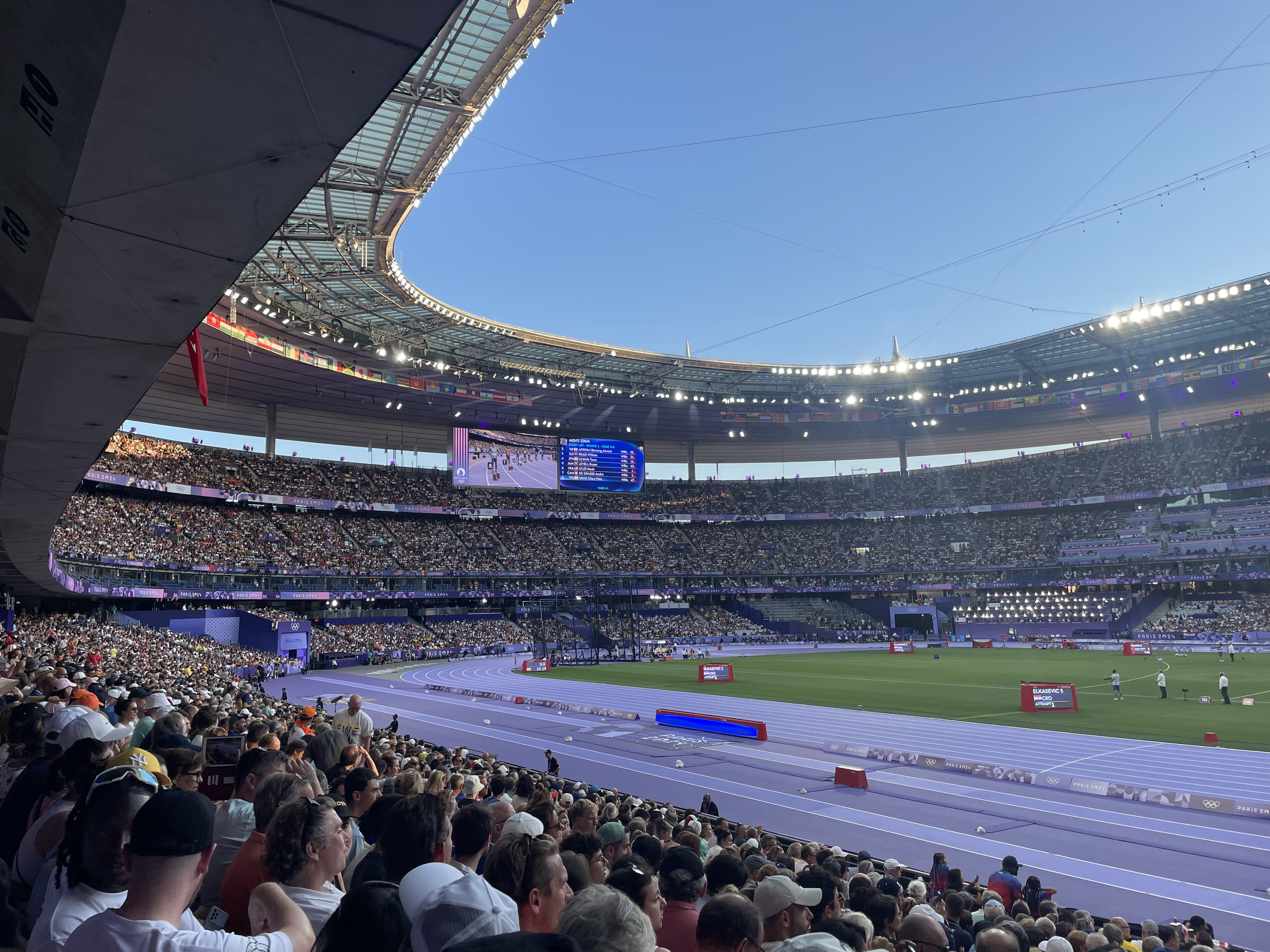
The Stade de France, where Kakiouea competed in his event

Nauru was eligible for a universality slot to send an athletics competitor to the games, which allows underrepresented nations to compete and for a National Olympic Committee (NOC) to send athletes despite not meeting the standard qualification criteria. The nation selected Kakiouea in July 2024, who would compete in the men's 100 meters and was ranked 3701st in the world at the time in the event.

Prior to the games, Kakiouea trained in Australia after an Australian coach noticed his performance at the 2024 World Athletics Indoor Championships and reached out to train him. Nauru was devoid of any proper racing track, with Kakiouea naming a track-like course present in Nauru as a "dirt oval". Kakiouea aimed to break his own national record in the event at these games.

=== Event ===
The athletics events were held at the Stade de France. Making his Olympic debut, Kakiouea competed in the preliminary rounds of the men's 100 meters on 2 August 2024 at 11:03 a.m., (Note: All times are Central European Summer Time (UTC+2)) where he raced in the fifth out of the six rounds. He ran in a time of 11.15 seconds, came sixth out of the eight competitors in his heat, and did not advance further. He expressed his disappointment, stating: "It's been amazing... but I'm not happy with my performance," with Matthew Mohan of Channel News Asia having described Kakiouea as having "disappointment written all over his face". Noah Lyles of the United States eventually won the gold in a time of 9.784 seconds.

Key

- Note–Ranks given for track events are within the athlete's heat only
- Q = Qualified for the next round
- q = Qualified for the next round as a fastest loser or, in field events, by position without achieving the qualifying target
- NR = National record
- N/A = Round not applicable for the event
- Bye = Athlete not required to compete in round

Track events summary
Athlete	Event	Preliminary		Heat		Semifinal		Final	
Athlete	Event	Result	Rank	Result	Rank	Result	Rank	Result	Rank
Winzar Kakiouea	Men's 100 m	11.15	6	Did not advance					
