= Nauru at the 2023 World Athletics Championships =

- Flag of Nauru
- WA code: NRU

in Budapest, Hungary 19 August 2023 – 27 August 2023
- Competitors: 1 (1 man and 0 women)
- Medals: Gold 0 Silver 0 Bronze 0 Total 0

World Athletics Championships appearances
- 1983; 1987; 1991; 1993; 1995; 1997; 1999; 2001; 2003; 2005; 2007; 2009; 2011; 2013; 2015; 2017; 2019; 2022; 2023; 2025

Nauru competed at the 2023 World Athletics Championships in Budapest, Hungary, which were held from 19 to 27 August 2023. The athlete delegation of the country was composed of one competitor, sprinter Winzar Kakiouea who competed in the men's 100 metres. Despite failing to advance from his preliminary round, he set a new personal best in the event with a time of 11.23 seconds.

== Background ==
The 2023 World Athletics Championships in Budapest, Hungary, were held from 19 to 27 August 2023. The Championships were held at the National Athletics Centre. To qualify for the World Championships, athletes had to reach an entry standard (e.g. time or distance), place in a specific position at select competitions, be a wild card entry, or qualify through their World Athletics Ranking at the end of the qualification period.

As Nauru did not meet any of the four standards, they could send either one male or one female athlete in one event of the Championships who has not yet qualified. The Nauru Athletics Association selected sprinter Winzar Kakiouea, who would compete in the men's 100 metres. By his selection, he had a personal best of 11.81 seconds in the event. This was also his first time competing at the World Championships and served as the nation's flagbearer during the opening ceremony. Before the Championships, he trained in South East Queensland.

== Results ==
Key

- Q = Qualified for the next round
- q = Qualified for the next round as a fastest loser or, in field events, by position without achieving the qualifying target
- NR = National record
- PB = Personal best
- SB = Season best
- N/A = Round not applicable for the event

=== Men ===
Kakiouea competed in the second preliminary round of the men's 100 metres on 19 August against six other sprinters. There, he set a new personal best with 11.23 seconds and placed fifth, failing to advance further as only the top two athletes in each heat and the two next fastest would be able to do so.

Track and road events

Athlete	Event	Preliminary		Heat		Semifinal		Final	
Athlete	Event	Result	Rank	Result	Rank	Result	Rank	Result	Rank
Winzar Kakiouea	100 metres	11.23 PB	5	Did not advance					
