= Nauru at the 1996 Summer Olympics =

- IOC code: NRU
- NOC: Nauru Olympic Committee
- Website: www.oceaniasport.com/nauru

in Atlanta
- Competitors: 3 in 1 sport
- Flag bearer: Marcus Stephen
- Medals: Gold 0 Silver 0 Bronze 0 Total 0

Summer Olympics appearances (overview)
- 1996; 2000; 2004; 2008; 2012; 2016; 2020; 2024

Nauru competed in the Olympic Games for the first time at the 1996 Summer Olympics in Atlanta, United States from 19 July to 4 August 1996. The delegation consisted of three weightlifters; Quincy Detenamo, Gerard Garabwan, and Marcus Stephen. Their best performances were by Detenamo, who came 20th in the men's 76 kg category and Garabwan who finished 24th in the men's 91 kg event. Stephen failed to finish his event, but would later become President of the Republic.

== Background ==
Nauru became independent from being a United Nations trust territory on 31 January 1968. The Nauru Olympic Committee was recognised by the International Olympic Committee on 1 January 1994. Accordingly, Atlanta was the island nation's first participation in Olympic competition. The 1996 Summer Olympics were held from 19 July to 4 August 1996. The Nauran delegation consisted of three weightlifters; Quincy Detenamo, Gerard Garabwan, and Marcus Stephen. The flag bearer for the opening ceremony was Stephen.

== Weightlifting ==
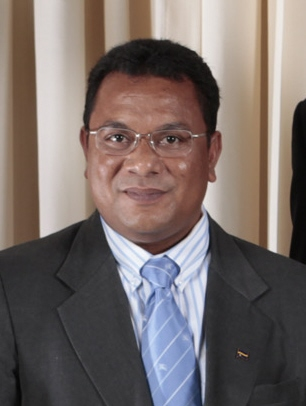
Marcus Stephen was later elected President of Nauru.

In Olympic weightlifting, each competitor gets three attempts at the snatch, with the highest weight lifted counting. Those who post a mark in the snatch move on to the clean and jerk, where, again, each competitor is allowed three attempts with the best counting. Final results are the sum of the best lift from each technique. Quincy Detenamo was 17 years old at the time of the Atlanta Olympics, and was making his only Olympic appearance. He competed in the men's 76 kilograms category, for those whose body weight was 76 kg or less. In the snatch, he succeeded at 100 kg, 105 kg, and on his last attempt was successful at 110 kg, his mark for this portion of the event. In the clean and jerk, he succeeded at 137.5 kg, before failing twice at 142.5 kg. Detenamio's total mark for the event was therefore 252.5 kg, good for 20th place among 21 classified finishers; the gold medal was won with a mark of 367.5 kg by Cuban athlete Pablo Lara.

Gerard Garabwan was 25 years of age, and also making his only Olympic appearance. He competed in the men's 91 kg category on 27 July. In the snatch, he lifted 110 kg and 115 kg in his first two attempts, and failed at 120 kg on his third. In the clean and jerk, he lifted 150 kg, before failing twice at 157.5 kg. His total mark was thus 265.0 kg, which put him 24th and last in the event. The gold medal was won by Russian Aleksey Petrov with a mark of 402.5 kg.

Marcus Stephen was 26 years old at the time of these Games, and was making his second Olympic appearance; he had previously represented Samoa at the 1992 Summer Olympics. He competed in the men's 59 kg category on 21 July. In the snatch, he failed all three attempts at 120 kg, and was eliminated from the competition. Stephen would return to represent Nauru at the 2000 Summer Olympics, and would later serve as the President of Nauru from 2007 to 2011.

Athlete	Event	Snatch		Clean & jerk		Total	Rank
Athlete	Event	Result	Rank	Result	Rank	Total	Rank
Quincy Detenamo	Men's 76 kg	110.0	23	142.5	20	252.5	20
Gerard Garabwan	Men's 91 kg	115.0	24	150.0	24	265.0	24
Marcus Stephen	Men's 59 kg	NM		DNS		NM	
