= Detenamo =

Detenamo is a Nauruan surname. Notable individuals with the surname include:

- Itte Detenamo (born 1986), Nauruan weightlifter
- Lovelite Detenamo (born 1993), Nauruan sprinter
- Quincy Detenamo (born 1979), Nauruan former weightlifter and murderer
- Vinson Detenamo (born 1954), Nauruan politician
