= Nauru at the 2000 Summer Olympics =

- IOC code: NRU
- NOC: Nauru Olympic Committee
- Website: www.oceaniasport.com/nauru

in Sydney
- Competitors: 3 in 2 sports
- Flag bearer: Marcus Stephen
- Medals: Gold 0 Silver 0 Bronze 0 Total 0

Summer Olympics appearances (overview)
- 1996; 2000; 2004; 2008; 2012; 2016; 2020; 2024

Nauru was represented at the 2000 Summer Olympics in Sydney, New South Wales, Australia by the Nauru Olympic Committee.

In total, three athletes including two men and one woman represented Nauru in two different sports including athletics and weightlifting.

Future President of Nauru Marcus Stephen competed at the Olympics for the final time.

== Background ==
The Nauru Olympic Committee was recognised by the International Olympic Committee on 1 January 1994. They made their Olympic debut two years later at the 1996 Summer Olympics in Atlanta, Georgia, United States. A delegation of three weightlifters represented the country at the games. They did not win any medals.

During the Olympic torch relay for the 2000 Summer Olympics, a tour of the Pacific Islands was scheduled for 22 May to 2 June 2000. It visited Yaren in Nauru on 25 May. Weightlifter Marcus Stephen was chosen to bear the Olympic torch during its stopover in Nauru. He had previously represented Western Samoa at the 1992 Summer Olympics in Barcelona, Spain and Nauru at the 1996 Summer Olympics.

== Competitors ==
In total, three athletes represented Nauru at the 2000 Summer Olympics in Sydney, New South Wales, Australia across two different sports.

Sport	Men	Women	Total
Athletics	1	0	1
Weightlifting	1	1	2
Total	2	1	3

== Athletics ==
In total, one Nauruan athlete participated in the athletics events – Cherico Detenamo in the men's 100 m.

Athlete	Event	Heat		Quarterfinal		Semifinal		Final	
Athlete	Event	Result	Rank	Result	Rank	Result	Rank	Result	Rank
Cherico Detenamo	100 m	DNS	N/A	did not advance					

== Weightlifting ==
In total, two Nauruan athletes participated in the weightlifting events – Sheeva Peo in the women's +75 kg category and Marcus Stephen in the men's –62 kg category.

Men

Athlete	Event	Snatch			Clean & Jerk			Total	Rank
Athlete	Event	1	2	3	1	2	3	Total	Rank
Marcus Stephen	–62 kg	115.0	122.5	~~127.5~~	152.5	162.5	~~167.5~~	285.0	11

Women

Athlete	Event	Snatch			Clean & Jerk			Total	Rank
Athlete	Event	1	2	3	1	2	3	Total	Rank
Sheeva Peo	+75 kg	92.5	~~97.5~~	97.5	122.5	~~127.5~~	~~127.5~~	220.0	10

== Aftermath ==
In 2007, weightlifter Marcus Stephen was elected as President of Nauru.
