= Nauru at the 2008 Summer Olympics =

- IOC code: NRU
- NOC: Nauru Olympic Committee
- Website: www.oceaniasport.com/nauru

in Beijing
- Competitors: 1 in 1 sport
- Flag bearers: Itte Detenamo (both opening and closing ceremonies)
- Medals: Gold 0 Silver 0 Bronze 0 Total 0

Summer Olympics appearances (overview)
- 1996; 2000; 2004; 2008; 2012; 2016; 2020; 2024; 2028

Nauru competed at the 2008 Summer Olympics, that were celebrated in Beijing, China, from 8 August to 24 August 2008. Nauru was represented by the Nauru Olympic Committee, and was the only nation out of 204 participating nations and territories that sent only a single athlete, and was one of 117 that won no medals at the Games. The sole athlete to represent the nation was Itte Detenamo, who participated in the weightlifting, and was the flag bearer in both the opening and closing ceremonies. This was the same number of athletes as at the 1996 Olympics, when Marcus Stephen (who later became President of Nauru) represented the country in the same sport, but was a decrease from the nation's last appearance at the Games when three athletes were sent to Athens. Nauru earned a berth for the weightlifting event in the Oceania and South Pacific Olympic Weightlifting Championships in 2008 and a chance to send participants in swimming and athletics events, but chose to send only a weightlifter. Itte Detenamo competed in the Group B of heavyweight class, fifteenth and last event of the weightlifting. He did not earn a medal, but finished with a personal best.

== Delegation ==
The delegation of the Nauru for the 2008 Summer Olympics consisted of four men. The first, Itte Detenamo, was the sole athlete and competed in the weightlifting competition. Also in the delegation as a manager of Itte was Yukio Peter—2004 Olympian—who holds the record for the best placing in any Olympics by any Nauruan, eighth in the lightweight category (69 kg) of the weightlifting event in the 2004 Summer Olympics. Delegation was also accompanied by Vinson Detenamo, father of Itte and the then and first President of the Nauru Olympic Committee. As the former sport minister of Nauru, Vinson had helped in the establishment of Nauru Olympic Committee in 1991 during his term in the Ministry of Sport. The final member of the delegation was Lou Keke as Nauru's Olympic chef de mission.

== Qualification ==
Nauru earned a qualification place in weightlifting in the International Weightlifting Federation's continental Olympic qualification event—Oceania and South Pacific Olympic Weightlifting Championships—held in Auckland, New Zealand from March 27 to 30, 2008. At the event only those National Olympic Committees (NOCs) of Oceania which had not gained berths for 2008 Olympics in the 2006 and 2007 World Weightlifting Championships got chance to win qualification places. Itte Detenamo was selected over Yukio Peter to fill the earned quota. Nauru could have sent participants in swimming and athletics also, but chose not to as there was no national governing body of swimming and the nation lacked basic infrastructure and competitive athletes in order to complete in athletics.

Nauru's representation of sole athlete in the 2008 Games was the same number of athletes as at the 1996 Olympics, when Marcus Stephen—incumbent President of Nauru, President of the Nauru Olympic Committee and Oceania Weightlifting Federation—represented the country in the same sport. Marcus had previously competed for Western Samoa in the 1992 Summer Olympics in Barcelona as Nauru was not recognized by the International Olympic Committee as a National Olympic Committee until 1994. The attendance at the 2008 games was a decrease from the nation's previous appearance at the Games when three athletes were sent to Athens.

== Weightlifting ==
Itte Detenamo represented Nauru in the super heavyweight class of weightlifting. It was his second Olympics appearance; he was ranked previously 14th in the same weight category at the 2004 Athens Olympics. The whole competition took place on 19 August, but was divided in two parts due to the number of competitors. Group B weightlifters competed at 15:30 CST, and Group A, at 19:00 CST. The event was the fifteenth and last weightlifting event to conclude. Itte competed in group B of the event; his highest successfully lifted weight in snatch was 175 kg, out of 165, 170 and 175 kg, and in clean and jerk his best was 210 kg, out of 205 and 210 kg, he also tried a failed attempt for 215 kg. Itte finished in 10th place in the final standings with a total of 385 kg, setting a personal best.

| Athlete | Event | Snatch | | Clean & Jerk | | Total | Rank |
| Athlete | Event | Result | Rank | Result | Rank | Total | Rank |
|---|---|---|---|---|---|---|---|
| Itte Detenamo | Men's +105 kg | 175 | 9 | 210 | 10 | 385 | 10 |

== See also ==
- Nauru at the 2010 Summer Youth Olympics
- Nauru at the 2010 Commonwealth Games
