= Nauru at the 2012 Summer Olympics =

- IOC code: NRU
- NOC: Nauru Olympic Committee
- Website: www.oceaniasport.com/nauru

in London
- Competitors: 2 in 2 sports
- Flag bearer: Itte Detenamo
- Medals: Gold 0 Silver 0 Bronze 0 Total 0

Summer Olympics appearances (overview)
- 1996; 2000; 2004; 2008; 2012; 2016; 2020; 2024

Nauru competed at the 2012 Summer Olympics in London, which was held from 27 July to 12 August 2012. The country's participation at London marked its fifth appearance in the Summer Olympics since its debut at the 1996 Summer Olympics. The delegation consisted of two participants: Sled Dowabobo in the men's (73 kilogram) lightweight judo contest and Itte Detenamo in the men's (105 kilogram) super-heavyweight weightlifting competition. Dowabobo qualified as one of Oceania's highest ranked judo competitors while Detenamo made the Games based on his qualifying performance. Detenamo was the flag bearer for both the opening and closing ceremonies. Dowabobo was eliminated by his opponent Navruz Jurakobilov in the round of 64 and Detemano was 14th in his event.

== Background ==
Nauru participated in five Summer Olympic Games between its debut in the 1996 Summer Olympics in Atlanta, United States and the 2012 Summer Olympics in London, United Kingdom. No Nauruan athlete has ever won a medal at the Olympic Games and the nation has not competed at the Winter Olympic Games. The nation participated in the London Summer Games from 27 July to 12 August 2012.

The two athletes selected to represent Nauru at the Olympics were judoka Sled Dowabobo and weightlifter Itte Detenamo Nauru, along with Barbados and Saint Kitts and Nevis, was one of three countries to send only male athletes to the 2012 Games. Along with the two athletes, the delegation consisted of their coaches Paul Coffa and Patrick Mahon. Dowabobo trained at the University of Bath. Detenamo was selected as the flag bearer for both the opening and closing ceremonies.

== Judo ==
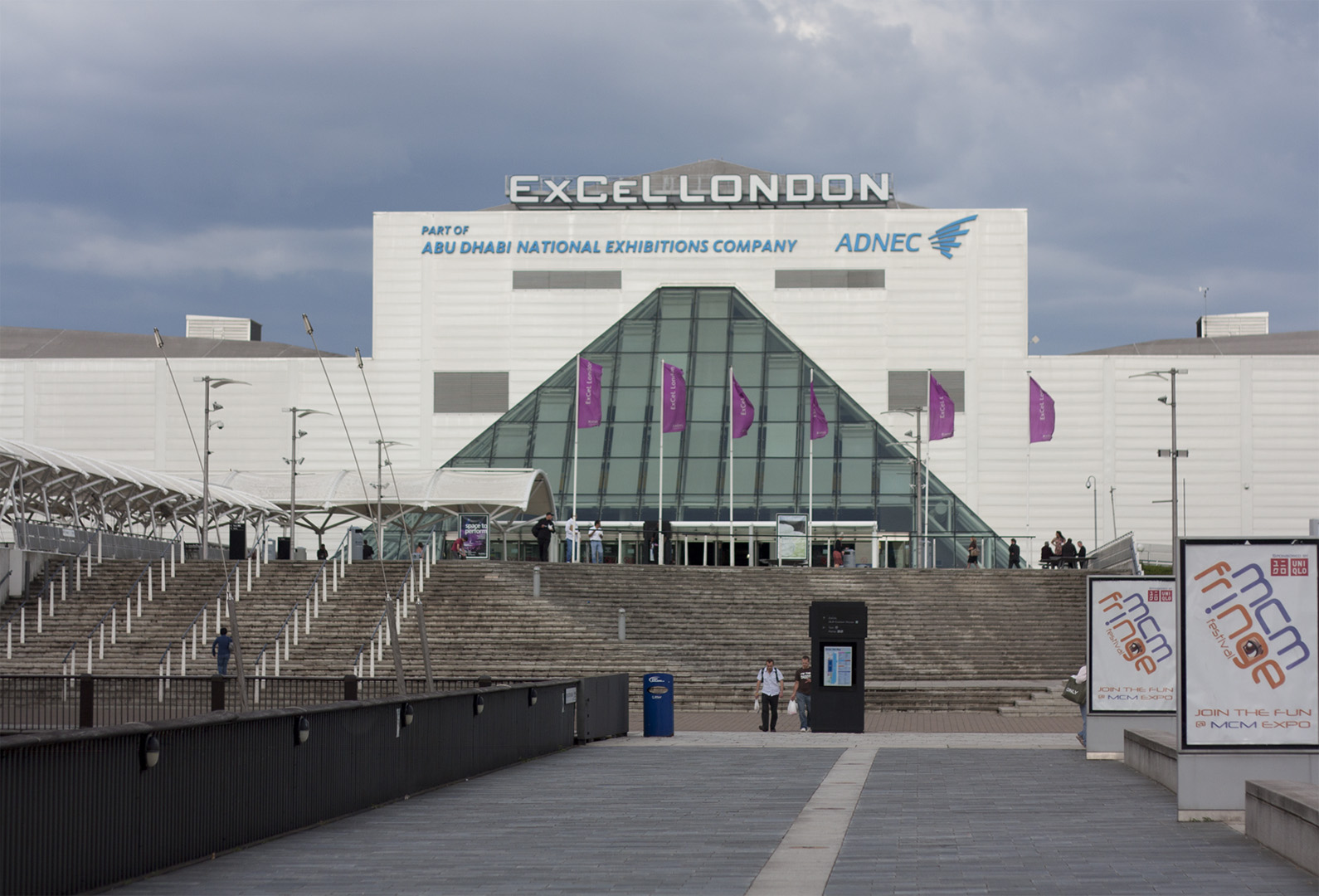
ExCeL London where Dowabobo and Detenamo competed in their respective events.

Sled Dowabobo represented Nauru in men's judo and was the oldest person to represent the country at the London Games at age 29. He had not taken part in any previous Olympic Games, but his participation at London marked the country's official Olympic debut in the sport at these Games. Dowabobo qualified for the Games after being chosen as one of the highest ranked Oceania athletes in any sporting discipline by the International Judo Federation, without having qualified. Before the Games, he said: "It will be awesome to be the first Olympic judo player from Nauru. I'm really excited about the Games." Dowabobo faced Navruz Jurakobilov of Uzbekistan in the round of 64 of the men's lightweight (73 kilogram) judo competition on 30 July. He was defeated by his opponent with a scoreline of 0001–0100 and the result meant he was eliminated from contention. Afterwards the president of Nauru's National Olympic Committee Marcus Stephen noted that Dowabobo was competing against a strong opponent and revealed that he encouraged his fellow countryman not to be antipathetic over the result and progress farther.

Athlete	Event	Round of 64	Round of 32	Round of 16	Quarterfinals	Semifinals	Repechage	Final / BM	
Athlete	Event	Opposition Result	Opposition Result	Opposition Result	Opposition Result	Opposition Result	Opposition Result	Opposition Result	Rank
Sled Dowabobo	Men's −73 kg	Jurakobilov (UZB); L 0001–0100	Did not advance						

== Weightlifting ==
Itte Detenamo participated on Nauru's behalf in the men's (105 kilogram) super-heavyweight weightlifting contest. He was the youngest person to represent Nauru at the London Games at the age of 25 and had participated for his country in the 2004 Summer Olympics in Athens and the 2008 Summer Olympics in Beijing. Detenamo qualified for the Games based on his performance at the 2012 Oceania Weightlifting Championships in Apia, Samoa. His event took place on 7 August and included 19 athletes in total. During the event's snatch phase, Detenamo was given three attempts. He successfully attempted to lift over 90 kilograms of weight in all three of his attempts. He then attempted 205 kilograms during the clean and jerk phase of the event, successfully lifting it on his first attempt. He did not succeed in lifting 215 kilograms on his second attempt, but was successful with 225 on his third. Overall the combination of Detenamo's highest scores in snatch (175) and clean and jerk (215) yielded a score of 390 points for 14th place. (Note: Three weightlifters did not finish.) Afterwards, his coach Paul Coffa revealed Detenamo was carrying a minor shoulder injury and had been keen to perform well because of the athlete being away from Nauru for a long period of time.

Athlete	Event	Snatch		Clean & Jerk		Total	Rank
Athlete	Event	Result	Rank	Result	Rank	Total	Rank
Itte Detenamo	Men's +105 kg	175	15	215	16	390	14
