= Peo =

Peo is the English version of the French-language surname Peillot. It may refer to:

== People with the surname Peo ==
- Sheeva Peo (born 1976), Olympic weightlifting competitor
- Ralph Peo (1897–1966), American inventor and industrialist

== Places ==
- Reckong Peo, the capital of Kinnaur district in India

== See also ==
- PEO (disambiguation)
