= Nauru at the 2004 Summer Olympics =

- IOC code: NRU
- NOC: Nauru Olympic Committee
- Website: www.oceaniasport.com/nauru

in Athens
- Competitors: 3 in 1 sport
- Flag bearer: Yukio Peter
- Medals: Gold 0 Silver 0 Bronze 0 Total 0

Summer Olympics appearances (overview)
- 1996; 2000; 2004; 2008; 2012; 2016; 2020; 2024

Nauru competed at the 2004 Summer Olympics in Athens, Greece, from 13 to 29 August 2004.

== Background ==
The Nauru Olympic Committee was recognized by the International Olympic Committee on 1 January 1994.

== Weightlifting ==
All three of Nauru's athletes at the Games were weightlifters, including 2002 Commonwealth champion Reanna Maricha Solomon. The best finish came from Peter, who beat out four other lifters to place 8th. Both male athletes were the youngest in their respective classes.

Athlete	Event	Snatch		Clean & Jerk		Total	Rank
Athlete	Event	Result	Rank	Result	Rank	Total	Rank
Yukio Peter	Men's −69 kg	135	12	167.5	7	302.5	8
Itte Detenamo	Men's +105 kg	155	16	192.5	14	347.5	14
Reanna Solomon	Women's +75 kg	95	=10	125	=10	220	11

== See also ==
- Nauru at the 2002 Commonwealth Games
