= Nauru at the 2011 World Championships in Athletics =

- WA code: NRU
- National federation: Nauru Amateur Athletic Association
- Website: www.sportingpulse.com/assoc_page.cgi?c=2-1146-0-0-0

in Daegu
- Competitors: 2
- Medals: Gold 0 Silver 0 Bronze 0 Total 0

World Championships in Athletics appearances
- 1983; 1987; 1991; 1993; 1995; 1997; 1999; 2001; 2003; 2005; 2007; 2009; 2011; 2013; 2015; 2017; 2019; 2022; 2023; 2025

The Republic of Nauru competed at the 2011 World Championships in Athletics from 27 August to 4 September in Daegu, South Korea. A team of 2 athletes was announced to represent the country in the event.

== Results ==
=== Men ===
Athlete	Event	Preliminaries		Heats		Semifinals		Final	
Athlete	Event	Time Width Height	Rank	Time Width Height	Rank	Time Width Height	Rank	Time Width Height	Rank
Joshua Jeremiah	100 metres	11.44 (PB)	20	Did not advance					

=== Women ===
Athlete	Event	Preliminaries		Heats		Semifinals		Final	
Athlete	Event	Time Width Height	Rank	Time Width Height	Rank	Time Width Height	Rank	Time Width Height	Rank
Lovelite Detenamo	100 metres	12.63 Q, PB	17	12.50 PB	52	Did not advance			
