= 2020 Summer Olympics closing ceremony flag bearers =

During the closing ceremony of the 2020 Summer Olympics in Tokyo, the flag bearers for the 205 National Olympic Committee's (NOCs) and the IOC Refugee Olympic Team entered the Olympic Stadium. The flags of each country were not necessarily carried by the same flag bearer as in the opening ceremony. Due to COVID-19 related protocols, athletes had to leave Japan within 48 hours from completion of their final event, leaving some countries without representation during the closing ceremony. Flags of the countries without athletes present were instead carried by volunteers. (Note: Photographic sources show the flags of countries with athletes present, such as British Virgin Islands and Iceland, were carried by Olympics volunteers.)

== Countries and flagbearers ==
The following is a list of each country's flag bearer. The list is sorted by the order in which each nation appears in the parade of nations. Names will be given as officially designated by the International Olympic Committee (IOC).

Because of the requirement that all competing athletes had to leave Tokyo within 48 hours of the completion of their events, not all of the National Olympic Committees were able to select a flag bearer for the closing ceremony, a games volunteer was represented instead.

Order	Nation	Japanese	Roman Transliteration	Flag bearer(s)	Sport	Ref
1	Greece	ギリシャ	Girisha	Ioannis Fountoulis	Water Polo	
2	Refugee Olympic Team	難民選手団	Nanmin Senshu-dan	Hamoon Derafshipour	Karate	
3	Iceland	アイスランド	Aisurando	No athletes present for Closing Ceremony		
4	Ireland	アイルランド	Airurando	Natalya Coyle	Modern Pentathlon	
5	Azerbaijan	アゼルバイジャン	Azerubaijan	Haji Aliyev	Wrestling	
6	Afghanistan	アフガニスタン	Afuganisutan	No athletes present for Closing Ceremony		
7	United Arab Emirates	アラブ首長国連邦	Arabu Shuchōkoku Renpō	No athletes present for Closing Ceremony		
8	Algeria	アルジェリア	Arujeria	Imane Khelif	Boxing	
9	Argentina	アルゼンチン	Aruzenchin	Pedro Ibarra	Field hockey	
10	Aruba	アルバ	Aruba	No athletes present for Closing Ceremony		
11	Albania	アルバニア	Arubania	No athletes present for Closing Ceremony		
12	Armenia	アルメニア	Arumenia	Hovhannes Bachkov	Boxing	
13	Angola	アンゴラ	Angora	No athletes present for Closing Ceremony		
14	Antigua and Barbuda	アンティグア・バーブーダ	Antigua Bābūda	Cejhae Greene	Athletics	
15	Andorra	アンドラ	Andora	Pol Moya	Athletics	
16	Yemen	イエメン	Iemen	No athletes present for Closing Ceremony		
17	Israel	イスラエル	Isuraeru	Linoy Ashram	Rhythmic Gymnastics	
18	Italy	イタリア	Itaria	Lamont Marcell Jacobs	Athletics	
19	Iraq	イラク	Iraku	No athletes present for Closing Ceremony		
20	Iran	イラン・イスラム共和国	Iran Isuramu Kyōwakoku	Amir Hossein Zare	Wrestling	
21	India	インド	Indo	Bajrang Bajrang	Wrestling	
22	Indonesia	インドネシア	Indoneshia	No athletes present for Closing Ceremony		
23	Uganda	ウガンダ	Uganda	Peruth Chemutai	Athletics	
24	Ukraine	ウクライナ	Ukuraina	Liudmyla Luzan	Canoe Sprint	
25	Uzbekistan	ウズベキスタン	Uzubekisutan	Akbar Djuraev	Weightlifting	
26	Uruguay	ウルグアイ	Uruguai	María Pía Fernández	Athletics	
27	Great Britain	英国	Eikoku	Laura Kenny	Cycling Track	
28	British Virgin Islands	英領バージン諸島	Ei-ryō Bājin Shotō	No athletes present for Closing Ceremony		
29	Ecuador	エクアドル	Ekuadoru	Glenda Morejón	Athletics	
30	Egypt	エジプト	Ejiputo	Giana Farouk	Karate	
31	Estonia	エストニア	Esutonia	Maicel Uibo	Athletics	
32	Eswatini	エスワティニ	Esuwatini	Sibusiso Matsenjwa	Athletics	
33	Ethiopia	エチオピア	Echiopia	Selemon Barega	Athletics	
34	Eritrea	エリトリア	Eritoria	Nazret Weldu	Athletics	
35	El Salvador	エルサルバドル	Erusarubadoru	Yamileth Solorzano	Boxing	
36	Australia	オーストラリア	Ōsutoraria	Mathew Belcher	Sailing	
37	Austria	オーストリア	Ōsutoria	Andreas Mueller	Cycling Track	
38	Oman	オマーン	Omān	No athletes present for Closing Ceremony		
39	Netherlands	オランダ	Oranda	Sifan Hassan	Athletics	
40	Ghana	ガーナ	Gāna	Samuel Takyi	Boxing	
41	Cape Verde	カーボべルデ	Kāboberude	Daniel Varela de Pina	Boxing	
42	Guyana	ガイアナ	Gaiana	Emanuel Archibald	Athletics	
43	Kazakhstan	カザフスタン	Kazafusutan	Kamshybek Kunkabayev	Boxing	
44	Qatar	カタール	Katāru	No athletes present for Closing Ceremony		
45	Canada	カナダ	Kanada	Damian Warner	Athletics	
46	Gabon	ガボン	Gabon	No athletes present for Closing Ceremony		
47	Cameroon	カメルーン	Kamerūn	No athletes present for Closing Ceremony		
48	The Gambia	ガンビア	Ganbia	Ebrima Camara	Athletics	
49	Cambodia	カンボジア	Kanbojia	No athletes present for Closing Ceremony		
50	North Macedonia	北マケドニア	Kita Makedonia	Magomedgadji Nurov	Wrestling	
51	Guinea	ギニア	Ginia	Fatoumata Camara	Wrestling	
52	Guinea-Bissau	ギニアビサウ	Giniabisau	Augusto Midana	Wrestling	
53	Cyprus	キプロス	Kipurosu	No athletes present for Closing Ceremony		
54	Cuba	キューバ	Kyūba	Zurian Hechavarria	Athletics	
55	Kiribati	キリバス	Kiribasu	Ruben Katoatau	Weightlifting	
56	Kyrgyzstan	キルギス	Kirugisu	Ernazar Akmataliev	Wrestling	
57	Guatemala	グアテマラ	Guatemara	Charles Fernández	Modern Pentathlon	
58	Guam	グアム	Guamu	Rckaela Aquino	Wrestling	
59	Kuwait	クウェート	Kuwēto	No athletes present for Closing Ceremony		
60	Cook Islands	クック諸島	Kukku Shotō	No athletes present for Closing Ceremony		
61	Grenada	グレナダ	Gurenada	Kirani James	Athletics	
62	Croatia	クロアチア	Kuroachia	Andro Buslje	Water Polo	
63	Cayman Islands	ケイマン諸島	Keiman Shotō	No athletes present for Closing Ceremony		
64	Kenya	ケニア	Kenia	Timothy Cheruiyot	Athletics	
65	Ivory Coast	コートジボワール	Kōtojibowāru	Marie-Josée Ta Lou	Athletics	
66	Costa Rica	コスタリカ	Kosutarika	Noelia Vargas	Athletics	
67	Kosovo	コソボ	Kosobo	Egzon Shala	Wrestling	
68	Comoros	コモロ	Komoro	Fadane Hamadi	Athletics	
69	Colombia	コロンビア	Koronbia	Ingrit Valencia	Boxing	
70	Republic of the Congo	コンゴ	Kongo	Gilles Anthony Afoumba	Athletics	
71	Democratic Republic of the Congo	コンゴ民主共和国	Kongo Minshu Kyōwakoku	No athletes present for Closing Ceremony		
72	Saudi Arabia	サウジアラビア	Saujiarabia	No athletes present for Closing Ceremony		
73	Samoa	サモア	Samoa	Anne Cairns	Canoe Sprint	
74	São Tomé and Príncipe	サントメ・プリンシペ	Santome Purinshipe	No athletes present for Closing Ceremony		
75	Zambia	ザンビア	Zanbia	Sydney Siame	Athletics	
76	San Marino	サンマリノ	Sanmarino	Myles Nazem Amine	Wrestling	
77	ROC	ROC	ROC (Note: The panel displayed the name "ROC" but the ROC was announced with its full name Comité olympique russe/Russian Olympic Committee/ロシアオリンピック委員会) (Note: ROC was sorted based on its French abbreviation COR, in Japanese Shī Ō Āru.)	Abdulrashid Sadulaev	Wrestling	
78	Sierra Leone	シエラレオネ	Shierareone	No athletes present for Closing Ceremony		
79	Djibouti	ジブチ	Jibuchi	Souhra Ali Mohamed	Athletics	
80	Jamaica	ジャマイカ	Jamaika	Stephenie Ann McPherson	Athletics	
81	Georgia	ジョージア	Jōjia	Gogita Arkania	Karate	
82	Syria	シリア・アラブ共和国	Shiria Arabu Kyōwakoku	No athletes present for Closing Ceremony		
83	Singapore	シンガポール	Shingapōru	Jonathan Chan	Diving	
84	Zimbabwe	ジンバブエ	Jinbabue	Scott Vincent	Golf	
85	Switzerland	スイス	Suisu	Elena Quirici	Karate	
86	Sweden	スウェーデン	Suwēden	Peder Fredricson	Equestrian	
87	Sudan	スーダン	Sūdan	No athletes present for Closing Ceremony		
88	Spain	スペイン	Supein	Sandra Sanchez Jaime	Karate	
89	Suriname	スリナム	Surinamu	No athletes present for Closing Ceremony		
90	Sri Lanka	スリランカ	Suriranka	Yupun Abeykoon Mudiyanselage	Athletics	
91	Slovakia	スロバキア	Surobakia	Danka Barteková	Shooting	
92	Slovenia	スロベニア	Surobenia	Janja Garnbret	Sport Climbing	
93	Seychelles	セーシェル	Sēsheru	Rodney Govinden	Sailing	
94	Equatorial Guinea	赤道ギニア	Sekidō Ginia	No athletes present for Closing Ceremony		
95	Senegal	セネガル	Senegaru	Adama Diatta	Wrestling	
96	Serbia	セルビア	Serubia	Jovana Preković	Karate	
97	Saint Kitts and Nevis	セントクリストファー・ネービス	Sentokurisutofā Nēbisu	No athletes present for Closing Ceremony		
98	Saint Vincent and the Grenadines	セントビンセント及びグレナディーン諸島	Sentobinsento Oyobi Gurenadīn Shotō	No athletes present for Closing Ceremony		
99	Saint Lucia	セントルシア	Sentorushia	Levern Spencer	Athletics	
100	Somalia	ソマリア	Somaria	No athletes present for Closing Ceremony		
101	Solomon Islands	ソロモン諸島	Soromon Shotō	Mary Kini Lifu	Weightlifting	
102	Thailand	タイ	Tai	Sudaporn Seesondee	Boxing	
103	South Korea	大韓民国	Daikanminkoku	Jun Woong-tae	Modern Pentathlon	
104	Chinese Taipei	チャイニーズ・タイペイ	Chainīzu Taipei	Chen Chieh	Athletics	
105	Tajikistan	タジキスタン	Tajikisutan	No athletes present for Closing Ceremony		
106	Tanzania	タンザニア連合共和国	Tanzania Rengō Kyōwakoku	Alphonce Felix Simbu	Athletics	
107	Czech Republic	チェコ共和国	Cheko Kyōwakoku	Jakub Vadlejch	Athletics	
108	Chad	チャド	Chado	No athletes present for Closing Ceremony		
109	Central African Republic	中央アフリカ共和国	Chūō Afurika Kyōwakoku	No athletes present for Closing Ceremony		
110	China	中華人民共和国	Chūka Jinmin Kyōwakoku	Bingtian Su	Athletics	
111	Tunisia	チュニジア	Chunijia	Ghailene Khattali	Canoe Sprint	
112	Chile	チリ	Chiri	María Mailliard	Canoe Sprint	
113	Tuvalu	ツバル	Tsubaru	Karalo Maibuca	Athletics	
114	Denmark	デンマーク	Denmāku	Emma Aastrand Jorgensen	Canoe Sprint	
115	Germany	ドイツ	Doitsu	Ronald Rauhe	Canoe Sprint	
116	Togo	トーゴ	Tōgo	Claire Ayivon	Rowing	
117	Dominica	ドミニカ	Dominika	Thea LaFond	Athletics	
118	Dominican Republic	ドミニカ共和国	Dominika Kyōwakoku	Prisilla Rivera Brens	Volleyball	
119	Trinidad and Tobago	トリニダード・トバゴ	Torinidādo Tobago	Andwuelle Wright	Athletics	
120	Turkmenistan	トルクメニスタン	Torukumenisutan	No athletes present for Closing Ceremony		
121	Turkey	トルコ	Toruko	Busenaz Surmeneli	Boxing	
122	Tonga	トンガ	Tonga	No athletes present for Closing Ceremony		
123	Nigeria	ナイジェリア	Naijeria	Odunayo Folasade Adekuoroye	Wrestling	
124	Nauru	ナウル	Nauru	Nancy Genzel Abouke	Weightlifting	
125	Namibia	ナミビア	Namibia	Beatrice Masilingi	Athletics	
126	Nicaragua	ニカラグア	Nikaragua	No athletes present for Closing Ceremony		
127	Niger	ニジェール	Nijēru	No athletes present for Closing Ceremony		
128	New Zealand	ニュージーランド	Nyūjīrando	Valerie Adams	Athletics	
129	Nepal	ネパール	Nepāru	No athletes present for Closing Ceremony		
130	Norway	ノルウェー	Noruwē	Katrine Lunde	Handball	
131	Bahrain	バーレーン	Bārēn	Husain Mahfoodh	Handball	
132	Haiti	ハイチ	Haichi	Mulern Jean	Athletics	
133	Pakistan	パキスタン	Pakisutan	Arshad Nadeem	Athletics	
134	Panama	パナマ	Panama	Jorge Castelblanco	Athletics	
135	Vanuatu	バヌアツ	Banuatsu	Riilio Rii	Rowing	
136	Bahamas	バハマ	Bahama	Megan Moss	Athletics	
137	Papua New Guinea	パプアニューギニア	Papuanyūginia	No athletes present for Closing Ceremony		
138	Bermuda	バミューダ	Bamyūda	No athletes present for Closing Ceremony		
139	Palau	パラオ	Parao	No athletes present for Closing Ceremony		
140	Paraguay	パラグアイ	Paraguai	Derlys Ayala	Athletics	
141	Barbados	バルバドス	Barubadosu	Tia-Adana Belle	Athletics	
142	Palestine	パレスチナ	Paresuchina	No athletes present for Closing Ceremony		
143	Hungary	ハンガリー	Hangarī	Balint Kopasz	Canoe Sprint	
144	Bangladesh	バングラデシュ	Banguradeshu	No athletes present for Closing Ceremony		
145	Timor-Leste	東ティモール民主共和国	Higashi Timōru Minshu Kyōwakoku	No athletes present for Closing Ceremony		
146	Fiji	フィジー	Fijī	Rusila Nagasau	Rugby Sevens	
147	Philippines	フィリピン	Firipin	Nesthy Petecio	Boxing	
148	Finland	フィンランド	Finrando	Mira Marjut Johanna Potkonen	Boxing	
149	Bhutan	ブータン	Būtan	Sangay Tenzin	Swimming	
150	Puerto Rico	プエルトリコ	Puerutoriko	Rafael Quintero Diaz	Diving	
151	Brazil	ブラジル	Burajiru	Rebeca Andrade	Artistic Gymnastics	
152	Bulgaria	ブルガリア	Burugaria	Simona Dyankova	Rhythmic Gymnastics	
153	Burkina Faso	ブルキナファソ	Burukinafaso	No athletes present for Closing Ceremony		
154	Brunei	ブルネイ・ダルサラーム	Burunei Darusarāmu	No athletes present for Closing Ceremony		
155	Burundi	ブルンジ	Burunji	No athletes present for Closing Ceremony		
156	American Samoa	米領サモア	Amerika-ryō Samoa	Nathan Crumpton	Athletics	
157	Virgin Islands	米領バージン諸島	Amerika-ryō Bājin Shotō	Eddie Lovett	Athletics	
158	Vietnam	ベトナム	Betonamu	No athletes present for Closing Ceremony		
159	Benin	ベナン	Benan	No athletes present for Closing Ceremony		
160	Venezuela	ベネズエラ	Benezuera	Antonio Jose Diaz Fernandez	Karate	
161	Belarus	ベラルーシ	Berarūshi	Ilya Palazkov	Modern Pentathlon	
162	Belize	ベリーズ	Berīzu	Amado Cruz	Canoe Sprint	
163	Peru	ペルー	Perū	Alexandra Vanessa Grande Risco	Karate	
164	Belgium	ベルギー	Berugī	Gregory Wathelet	Equestrian	
165	Poland	ポーランド	Pōrando	Karolina Naja	Canoe Sprint	
166	Bosnia and Herzegovina	ボスニア・ヘルツェゴビナ	Bosunia Herutsegobina	Amel Tuka	Athletics	
167	Botswana	ボツワナ	Botsuwana	Anthony Pasela	Athletics	
168	Bolivia	ボリビア	Boribia	Angela Castro	Athletics	
169	Portugal	ポルトガル	Porutogaru	Pedro Pichardo	Athletics	
170	Hong Kong	ホンコン・チャイナ	Honkon Chaina	Mo Sheung Grace Lau	Karate	
171	Honduras	ホンジュラス	Honjurasu	Ivan Zarco Alvarez	Athletics	
172	Marshall Islands	マーシャル諸島	Māsharu Shotō	No athletes present for Closing Ceremony		
173	Madagascar	マダガスカル	Madagasukaru	No athletes present for Closing Ceremony		
174	Malawi	マラウイ	Maraui	No athletes present for Closing Ceremony		
175	Mali	マリ	Mari	No athletes present for Closing Ceremony		
176	Malta	マルタ	Maruta	No athletes present for Closing Ceremony		
177	Malaysia	マレーシア	Marēshia	Pandelela Pamg	Diving	
178	Federated States of Micronesia	ミクロネシア連邦	Mikuroneshia Renpō	No athletes present for Closing Ceremony		
179	South Africa	南アフリカ	Minami Afurika	Anaso Jobodwana	Athletics	
180	South Sudan	南スーダン	Minami Sūdan	Abraham Guem	Athletics	
181	Myanmar	ミャンマー	Myanmā	No athletes present for Closing Ceremony		
182	Mexico	メキシコ	Mekishiko	Mayan Oliver	Modern Pentathlon	
183	Mauritius	モーリシャス	Mōrishasu	No athletes present for Closing Ceremony		
184	Mauritania	モーリタニア	Mōritania	No athletes present for Closing Ceremony		
185	Mozambique	モザンビーク	Mozanbīku	No athletes present for Closing Ceremony		
186	Monaco	モナコ	Monako	No athletes present for Closing Ceremony		
187	Maldives	モルディブ	Morudibu	No athletes present for Closing Ceremony		
188	Moldova	モルドバ共和国	Morudoba Kyōwakoku	Andrian Mardare	Athletics	
189	Morocco	モロッコ	Morokko	Btissam Sadini	Karate	
190	Mongolia	モンゴル	Mongoru	Lkhagvagerel Munkhtur	Wrestling	
191	Montenegro	モンテネグロ	Monteneguro	Dusan Matkovic	Water Polo	
192	Jordan	ヨルダン	Yorudan	Abdelrahman Al-Masafta	Karate	
193	Laos	ラオス人民民主共和国	Raosu Jinmin Minshu Kyōwakoku	Siri Arun Budcharern	Swimming	
194	Latvia	ラトビア	Ratobia	Pavels Svecovs	Modern Pentathlon	
195	Lithuania	リトアニア	Ritoania	Justinas Kinderis	Modern Pentathlon	
196	Libya	リビア	Ribia	Ali Omar	Judo	
197	Liechtenstein	リヒテンシュタイン	Rihitenshutain	Lara Mechnig	Artistic Swimming	
198	Liberia	リベリア	Riberia	No athletes present for Closing Ceremony		
199	Romania	ルーマニア	Rūmania	Catalin Chirilă	Canoe Sprint	
200	Luxembourg	ルクセンブルク	Rukusenburuku	Bob Bertemes	Athletics	
201	Rwanda	ルワンダ	Ruwanda	John Hakizimana	Athletics	
202	Lesotho	レソト	Resoto	Neheng Khatala	Athletics	
203	Lebanon	レバノン	Rebanon	No athletes present for Closing Ceremony		
204	United States	アメリカ合衆国	Amerika Gasshūkoku	Kara Winger	Athletics	
205	France	フランス	Furansu	Steven Da Costa	Karate	
206	Japan	日本	Nihon	Ryo Kiyuna	Karate	
