= Winzar =

Winzar may refer to:

- Winzar Kakiouea (born 2001), Nauruan sprinter
- Winzar (Legends of Chima), a fictional character in the animated television series Legends of Chima
