= PEO =

PEO may stand for:

== Business ==
- Professional Engineers Ontario, professional and regulatory organization for engineers in Ontario, Canada
- Pancyprian Federation of Labour, an umbrella organization for trade unions in Cyprus (Greek: Παγκύπρια Εργατική Ομοσπονδία, Pankypria Ergatiki Omospondhia)
- Professional employer organization, a service provider of outsourced human resource management
- Bank Polska Kasa Opieki, WSE stock ticker symbol

== Military and law enforcement ==
- Parking enforcement officer, an official who issues parking tickets
- Program executive officer, an individual, civilian or military, responsible for large scale U.S. military acquisitions
- Programs Evaluation Office, a covert U.S. paramilitary mission in Laos in 1955–62

== Science ==
- Plasma electrolytic oxidation, a surface-treatment process for metals
- Polyethylene oxide, alternate name for Polyethylene glycol, a polymer
- Progressive external ophthalmoplegia, alternate term for chronic progressive external ophthalmoplegia, an eye disorder

== Other uses ==
- P.E.O. Sisterhood, an international women's organization with headquarters in North America
- Old Persian, ISO 639-2 and ISO 639-3 language code peo

== See also ==
- Peo (disambiguation)
