= Nauru at the 1983 World Championships in Athletics =

- Flag of Nauru
- WA code: NRU

in Helsinki, Finland 7–14 August 1983
- Competitors: 2 (1 man and 1 woman) in 2 events
- Medals: Gold 0 Silver 0 Bronze 0 Total 0

World Championships in Athletics appearances
- 1983; 1987; 1991; 1993; 1995; 1997; 1999; 2001; 2003; 2005; 2007; 2009; 2011; 2013; 2015; 2017; 2019; 2022; 2023; 2025

Nauru competed at the 1983 World Championships in Athletics in Helsinki, Finland, from 7 August to 14 August.

== Men ==
Track and road events

Athlete	Event	Heat		Quarterfinal		Semifinal		Final	
Athlete	Event	Result	Rank	Result	Rank	Result	Rank	Result	Rank
Joske Teabuge	100 metres	12.20	64	Did not advance					

== Women ==
Field events

Athlete	Event	Qualification		Final	
Athlete	Event	Distance	Position	Distance	Position
Juliet Cain	Discus throw	NM		Did not advance	
