= Nauru at the 2016 Summer Olympics =

- IOC code: NRU
- NOC: Nauru Olympic Committee
- Website: www.oceaniasport.com/nauru

in Rio de Janeiro
- Competitors: 2 in 2 sports
- Flag bearers: Elson Brechtefeld (opening); Ovini Uera (closing)
- Medals: Gold 0 Silver 0 Bronze 0 Total 0

Summer Olympics appearances (overview)
- 1996; 2000; 2004; 2008; 2012; 2016; 2020; 2024

Nauru competed at the 2016 Summer Olympics in Rio de Janeiro, Brazil, from 5 to 21 August 2016. The country's participation in Brazil was its sixth consecutive appearance at the Summer Olympics since its debut at the 1996 Summer Olympics. Nauru's delegation included two participants: Ovini Uera, a judoka in the men's middleweight judo category; and Elson Brechtefeld in the men's 56 kg weightlifting competition. Uera qualified as Nauru's top-ranked judoka, in the IJF World Ranking List through a quota slot from the Oceania Judo Union. Brechtefeld qualified by grant from the International Weightlifting Federation of an unused quota place. Uera was eliminated by Varlam Liparteliani in the round of 16 and Brechtefeld finished 15th in his event.

== Background ==
Nauru participated in six Summer Olympic Games between its debut in the 1996 Summer Olympics in Atlanta, United States and the 2016 Summer Olympics in Rio de Janeiro, Brazil. The country sent its largest delegation to a Summer Games when three athletes took part in both the 1996 and 2004 Olympics. Nauru has yet to win its first Olympic medal.

The Nauru National Olympic Committee selected two athletes, having chosen for the second successive time to compete only in judo and weightlifting. This was Nauru's second-largest team sent to the Olympics, tying with 2000 in Sydney and 2012 in London for this number of athletes. The Nauruan athletes chosen were judoka Ovini Uera in the men's 90 kg category, and weightlifter and 2010 Youth Olympian Elson Brechtefeld (men's 56 kg). Brechtefeld was the flag bearer for the opening ceremony and Uera for the closing ceremony.

== Judo ==
Nauru qualified one judoka for the men's middleweight category (90 kg) at the Games. Ovini Uera earned the continental quota spot from the Oceania region, as Nauru's top-ranked judoka in the IJF World Ranking List of 30 May 2016. Uera said in an interview that he started judo in 2012 from his need to learn grapples in boxing. He said he "immediately fell in love with the sport".

Judo is really small on the island, there are only about 20 judokas, and every time I train, I have to train only three people, every judo session, because all the rest they are mostly kids.

— Ovini Uera,

Uera produced the nation's best result with an opening-round triumph over Belize's Renick James, before falling short in his next match to eventual silver medal winner Varlam Liparteliani of Georgia.

Athlete	Event	Round of 64	Round of 32	Round of 16	Quarterfinals	Semifinals	Repechage	Final / BM	
Athlete	Event	Opposition Result	Opposition Result	Opposition Result	Opposition Result	Opposition Result	Opposition Result	Opposition Result	Rank
Ovini Uera	Men's −90 kg	Bye	James (BIZ); W 100–000	Liparteliani (GEO); L 000–100	did not advance				

== Weightlifting ==
Nauru received an unused quota place from the IWF to send a male weightlifter to the Olympics, the nation's sixth consecutive participation. Nauru has been relatively notable for its weightlifting, as one of its participants Marcus Stephen served as president of the country after his retirement from the sport. The country has previously won a medal at every edition of the Commonwealth Games it has contested. Brechtefeld successfully cleared his first and second snatch attempts of 95 kilograms (209 lb) and 98 kilograms (216 lb), but scratched his final attempt of 101 kilograms (223 lb). For the clean and jerk section, he completed his first attempt of 120 kilograms (260 lb). After failing his second attempt of 125 kilograms (276 lb), he succeeded in his final attempt of clearing the weight, ending up with a total score of 223 and ranking 15th and last of the competitors who achieved a total.

Athlete	Event	Snatch		Clean & Jerk		Total	Rank
Athlete	Event	Result	Rank	Result	Rank	Total	Rank
Elson Brechtefeld	Men's 56 kg	98	17	125	15	223	15
