= Jonathan-Deiwea Detageouwa =

Naurun athlete (born 1994

Personal information
- Nationality: Nauru
- Born: 4 February 1994 (age 32)

Sport
- Sport: Athletics
- Events: Shot put, discus

Achievements and titles
- Personal bests: Shot put: 16.07m (Saipan, 2023) NR; Discus: 42.90m (Suva, 2024) NR
Medal record
Men's athletics
Representing Nauru
Pacific Games
Bronze medal – third place	2023 Honiara	Shot put
Oceania Championships
Bronze medal – third place	2024 Suva	Discus

Jonathan-Deiwea Detageouwa (born 4 February 1994) is a track and field athlete from Nauru. He is the national record holder in shot put and discus throw, and a bronze medalist at the 2024 Oceania Athletics Championships.

== Biography ==
In 2022, he competed at the 2022 Oceania Athletics Championships in Mackay, Australia, finishing in sixth place in the shot put. In the August of that year he was selected for the shot put at the 2022 Commonwealth Games in Birmingham where he threw a personal best of 15.41m in the final to place twelfth.

In June 2023, he managed a 16.07m personal best to win gold in the shot put at the 2023 Oceania Athletics Cup in Saipan, Northern Mariana Islands.

He won the bronze medal at the 2024 Oceania Athletics Championships in Suva, Fiji, with a 42.90 metres discus throw.

In July 2026, he qualified for the final and placed tenth overall in the shot put at the 2026 Commonwealth Games in Glasgow, Scotland.

== Personal life ==
He worked as a security guard in his native Nauru.
