= List of Nauruan records in athletics =

The following are the national records in athletics in Nauru maintained by the Nauru Athletics Association (NAA).

== Outdoor ==
Key to tables: Awaiting ratification Record not kept by NAA Not ratified or later rescinded by NAA

=== Men ===
Event	Record	Athlete	Date	Meet	Place	Ref.
100 m	10.78 (+1.7 m/s)	Winzar Kakiouea	4 July 2025	Pacific Mini Games	Koror, Palau	
100 m	10.6 h NWI	Jonah Harris	May 2018		Aiwo, Nauru	
200 m	21.96 (−0.4 m/s)	Jonah Harris	10 April 2018	Commonwealth Games	Gold Coast, Australia	
200 m	21.7 h	Fredrick Cannon	31 January 1994		Meneñ, Nauru	
400 m	51.47	Jonah Harris	1 December 2018		Brisbane, Australia	
400 m	51.3 h	Tryson Duburiya			Meneñ, Nauru	
800 m	2:12.35	John-Rico Togogae	July 2014	Micronesian Games	Palikir, Pohnpei, Federation of Micronesia	
1000 m	3:19.97^{†}	Deamo Baguga	15 December 2006	Oceania Championships	Apia, Samoa	
1500 m	4:29.8 h	Gemenoa Joramm	2 September 1963	South Pacific Games	Suva, Fiji	
1500 m	4:26.39	Isaac Oppenheimer	7 July 2025	Pacific Mini Games	Koror, Palau	
3000 m	11:38.89	David Temaki	15 March 1993	Oceania Youth Championships	Canberra, Australia	
5000 m	18:29.8 h	Karl Teabuge	18 August 1969	South Pacific Games	Port Moresby, Papua and New Guinea	
10,000 m						
Half marathon	1:19:20	Isaac Oppenheimer	4 July 2026	Oceania Half Marathon Championships	Gold Coast, Australia	
Marathon	3:48:06	Karl Hartman	1968		Nauru	
110 m hurdles	18.93^{†}	Deamo Baguga	15 December 2006	Oceania Championships	Apia, Samoa	
400 m hurdles	67.0 h	A-One Temaki	18 May 1987		South Tarawa, Kiribati	
3000 m steeplechase	10:59.0 h	Karl Teabuge	15 August 1969	South Pacific Games	Port Moresby, Papua and New Guinea	
High jump	1.77 m	Deamo Baguga	14 December 2007	Micronesian Regional Championships	Manenggon Hills, Guam	
Pole vault						
Long jump	6.58 m	Fredrick Cannon	17 May 1996		Meneñ, Nauru	
Triple jump	12.61 m (−0.9 m/s)	Deamo Baguga	6 August 2009	Oceania Regional Championships	Gold Coast, Queensland, Australia	
Shot put	14.28 m	A-One Tannang	17 May 2011		Aiwo, Nauru	
Shot put	15.41 m	Jonathan-Deiwea Detageouwa	5 August 2022	Commonwealth Games	Birmingham, United Kingdom	
Shot put	16.07 m	Jonathan-Deiwea Detageouwa	23 June 2023	Oceania Cup	Saipan, Northern Mariana Islands	
Shot put	17.19 m	Jonathan-Deiwea Detageouwa	6 July 2025	Pacific Mini Games	Koror, Palau	
Discus throw	38.99 m	Joseph Dabana	27 June 2012	Oceania Championships	Cairns, Australia	
Discus throw	44.02 m	Jonathan-Deiwea Detageouwa	17 May 2023	Nauruan Championships	Meneñ, Nauru	
Discus throw	42.90 m	Jonathan Detageouwa	5 June 2024	Oceania Championships	Suva, Fiji	
Hammer throw	32.80 m	Gerard Jones	31 January 1994		Meneñ, Nauru	
Javelin throw	49.50 m	Fine Olsson	17 September 1994		Meneñ, Nauru	
Decathlon						
Decathlon	100m (wind) / Long jump (wind) / Shot put / High jump / 400m / 110m H (wind) / Discus / Pole vault / Javelin / 1500m					
20 km walk (road)						
50 km walk (road)						
4 × 100 m relay	44.03	Nauru; Koutua Kepae; Fadandus Ika; Joshua Jeremiah; Winzar Kakiouea	21 June 2024	Micronesian Games	Majuro, Marshall Islands	
4 × 400 m relay	3:42.07	Nauru; Winzar Kakiouea; Fadandus Ika; Koutua Kepae; Joshua Jeremiah	20 June 2024	Micronesian Games	Majuro, Marshall Islands	

^{†}: result obtained during the octathlon.

=== Women ===
Event	Record	Athlete	Date	Meet	Place	Ref.
100 m	12.22 (+1.5 m/s)	Lovelite Detenamo	4 September 2013	Pacific Mini Games	Mata-Utu, Wallis and Futuna	
100 m	12.2 h	Rosa-Mystique Jone	28 April 2007		Aiwo, Nauru	
200 m	25.50 (+1.1 m/s)	Lovelite Detenamo	6 September 2013	Pacific Mini Games	Mata-Utu, Wallis and Futuna	
400 m	1:06.80	Trudy Duburiya	6 August 1998	Micronesian Games	Koror, Palau	
400 m	63.0 h	Trudy Duburiya	19 March 1994		Meneñ, Nauru	
800 m	2:47.3 h	Damaris Porte	15 May 2007		Aiwo, Nauru	
800 m	2:44.6 h (Note: not a Nauru, but Kiribati citizen)	Tawaieta Lausaveve	12 June 1971		Meneñ, Nauru	
1500 m	5:44.21	Belista Hartman	30 August 1989	South Pacific Mini Games	Nukuʻalofa, Tonga	
3000 m	14:18.9 h	Bianca Ika	15 June 2007		Bairiki, Kiribati	
5000 m						
10,000 m						
Marathon						
100 m hurdles	21.0 h	Dana Thoma	16 June 2007		South Tarawa, Kiribati	
400 m hurdles	1:18.8 h	Rae Ifrica Detabene	16 June 2007		Bairiki, Kiribati	
3000 m steeplechase						
High jump	1.26 m	Arrora Depaune	3 April 2007		Yaren, Nauru	
Pole vault						
Long jump	4.90 m	Lovelite Crissa Detenamo	2 May 2009		Aiwo, Nauru	
Triple jump	9.40 m	Dana Thoma	28 March 2006		Yaren, Nauru	
Shot put	11.36 m	Nina Grundler	13 August 2011	Gold Coast Winter Series #7	Gold Coast, Queensland, Australia	
Discus throw	37.15 m	Chanana Jeremiah	12 May 2018		Aiwo, Nauru	
Hammer throw	22.40 m	Jaya-Shalimar Teboua	20 June 2024	Micronesian Games	Majuro, Marshall Islands	
Javelin throw	23.96 m (new design)	Rosa-Mystique Jone	16 June 2007		Bairiki, Kiribati	
Javelin throw	31.60 m (old design)	Madrina Denga	31 January 1994		Meneñ, Nauru	
Heptathlon						
Heptathlon	100m H (wind) / High jump / Shot put / 200m (wind) / Long jump (wind) / Javelin / 800m					
20 km walk (road)						
20 km walk (road)						
4 × 100 m relay	53.45	Nauru; Rosa-Mystique Jone; Risen Olsson; Dana Thoma; Rae Ifrica Detabene	26 April 2003	Micronesian Regional Championships	Koror, Palau	
4 × 400 m relay	4:28.47	Nauru	30 August 1989	South Pacific Mini Games	Nukuʻalofa, Tonga	

== Indoor ==
=== Men ===
Event	Record	Athlete	Date	Meet	Place	Ref.
60 m	7.03	Jonah Harris	3 March 2018	World Championships	Birmingham, United Kingdom	
200 m						
400 m						
800 m						
1500 m						
3000 m						
60 m hurdles						
High jump						
Pole vault						
Long jump						
Triple jump						
Shot put						
Heptathlon						
Heptathlon	60m / Long jump / Shot put / High jump / 60m H / Pole vault / 1000m					
5000 m walk						
4 × 400 m relay						

=== Women ===
Event	Record	Athlete	Date	Meet	Place	Ref.
60 m	7.94	Lovelite Detenamo	8 March 2014	World Championships	Sopot, Poland	
200 m						
400 m						
800 m						
1500 m						
3000 m						
60 m hurdles						
High jump						
Pole vault						
Long jump						
Triple jump						
Shot put						
Pentathlon						
Pentathlon	60m H / High jump / Shot put / Long jump / 800m					
3000 m walk						
4 × 400 m relay						
