= Lovelite Detenamo =

Nauruan sprinter

Personal information
- Full name: Lovelite Chrissa Detenamo
- Nationality: Nauruan
- Born: 22 December 1993 (age 32)
- Height: 1.55 m (5.1 ft) (2014)

Sport
- Sport: Track and field
- Event: Sprints
Medal record
Athletics
Representing Nauru
Pacific Mini Games
Bronze medal – third place	2013 Mata-Utu	100m
- Updated on 23 May 2015

Lovelite Chrissa Detenamo (born 22 December 1993) is a Nauruan sprinter.

Detenamo made her first appearance on the world stage at the 2009 World Youth Championships in Athletics in Brixen, Italy. She was among the 16 athletes selected from Pacific Islands nations for the championships. Running in the 100 metres event, she failed to qualify for the quarter-finals, but she still set a new personal best of 13.32 seconds.

Detenamo was one of the two athletes who represented Nauru at the 2012 IAAF World Indoor Championships, Istanbul, Turkey. She set a new national record in the 60 metres event with an 8.04 seconds time.

== Personal bests ==
Event	Result	Venue	Date
Outdoor
100 m	12.22 s (wind: +1.5 m/s)	(Wallis and Futuna) / (Wallis and Futuna) Mata Utu	4 Sep 2013
200 m	25.50 s (wind: +1.1 m/s)	(Wallis and Futuna) / (Wallis and Futuna) Mata Utu	6 Sep 2013
Indoor
60 m	7.94 s	(Poland) Sopot	8 Mar 2014

== Competition record ==
Year	Competition	Venue	Position	Event	Notes
Representing Nauru
2008	Oceania Youth Championships	Saipan, Northern Mariana Islands	6th	100m	13.64 (wind: -0.7 m/s)
2008	Oceania Youth Championships	Saipan, Northern Mariana Islands	7th	400m	69.51
2009	World Youth Championship	Bressanone, Italy	56th (h)	100 m	13.32 (wind: -0.4 m/s)
2009	Micronesian Championships	Gold Coast, Queensland, Australia	2nd	100m	13.39 (wind: -0.1 m/s)
2009	Micronesian Championships	Gold Coast, Queensland, Australia	2nd	200m	27.44 (wind: +1.7 m/s)
2010	Oceania Youth Championships	Sydney, Australia	24th (h)	100m	13.21 (wind: +0.8 m/s)
2010	World Junior Championships	Moncton, New Brunswick, Canada	35th (h)	100m	12.75 (wind: 0.0 m/s)
2010	Youth Olympic Games	Singapore	21st (h)	100m	13.04 (wind: -0.3 m/s)
2010	Oceania Junior Championships	Cairns, Queensland, Australia	2nd	100m	12.64 w (wind: +2.3 m/s)
2010	Oceania Junior Championships	Cairns, Queensland, Australia	5th	200m	27.23 (wind: -0.9 m/s)
2010	Oceania Championships	Cairns, Queensland, Australia	5th	Mixed 800m sprint medley relay	1:50.27
2011	World Championships	Daegu, South Korea	52nd (h)	100m	12.51 (wind: +0.9 m/s)
2011	Pacific Games	Nouméa, New Caledonia	6th	100m	12.60 (wind: +0.3 m/s)
2011	Pacific Games	Nouméa, New Caledonia	8th (h)	200m	27.51 (wind: -1.6 m/s)
2011	Pacific Games	Nouméa, New Caledonia	8th	Discus	21.96m
2011	Pacific Games	Nouméa, New Caledonia	—	4 × 100 m relay	DQ
2012	World Indoor Championships	Istanbul, Turkey	47th (h)	60m	8.04
2012	Oceania Junior Championships (Regional Division East)	Cairns, Queensland, Australia	1st	100m	12.36 (wind: -0.1 m/s)
2012	World Junior Championships	Barcelona, Spain	40th (h)	100m	12.75 (wind: -2.4 m/s)
2013	World Championships	Moscow, Russia	37th (h)	100m	12.35 (wind: -0.4 m/s)
2013	Pacific Mini Games	Mata-Utu, Wallis and Futuna	3rd	100m	12.22 (wind: +1.5 m/s)
2013	Pacific Mini Games	Mata-Utu, Wallis and Futuna	4th	200m	25.50 (wind: +1.1 m/s)
2014	World Indoor Championships	Sopot, Poland	40th (h)	60m	7.94
2014	Commonwealth Games	Glasgow, United Kingdom	—	100m	DQ
2014	Oceania Championships	Rarotonga, Cook Islands	4th	100m	12.40 (wind: +0.7 m/s)
2014	Oceania Championships	Rarotonga, Cook Islands	5th	Mixed 800m sprint medley relay	1:47.61
