= Nauru Olympic Committee =

- Country: Nauru
- Code: NRU
- Created: 1991
- Recognized: 1994
- Continental Association: ONOC
- President: Marcus Stephen
- Secretary General: Pres-Nimes Ekwona
- Website: oceaniasport.com/nauru

The Nauru Olympic Committee (IOC code: NRU) is the National Olympic Committee representing Nauru, the world's smallest country. It represents and organises the Olympic movement on the island. The NNOC was founded in 1991 and was recognised by the International Olympic Committee in 1994. It is also the body responsible for Nauru's representation at the Commonwealth Games.

Nauru has participated regularly in the Olympic Games since 1992. As of February 2025, the NNOC has sent thirteen athletes to the Olympic Games.

- Marcus Stephen (1992-2000), first Nauruan Olympian
- Quincy Detenamo (1996)
- Gerard Garabwan (1996)
- Sheeva Peo (2000), first Nauruan woman Olympian
- Itte Detenamo (2004, 2008)
- Yukio Peter (2004)
- Reanna Solomon (2004)
- Sled Dowabobo (2012)
- Elson Brechtefeld (2016)
- Ovini Uera (2016)
- Nancy Genzel Abouke (2020)
- Jonah Harris (2020)
- Winzar Kakiouea (2024)

== See also ==
- Nauru at the Olympics
- Nauru at the Commonwealth Games
