= Nancy Genzel Abouke =

Nauruan weightlifter (born 2003)

Personal information
- Born: 5 July 2003 (age 22)

Sport
- Country: Nauru
- Sport: Weightlifting
- Weight class: 71 kg
- Team: National team
Medal record
Women's weightlifting
Representing Nauru
Oceania Championships
| Silver medal – second place | 2018 Le Mont-Dore | 58 kg |

Nancy Genzel Abouke (born 5 July 2003) is a weightlifter representing Nauru, one of only two athletes representing the country in the 2020 Summer Olympics after she was given a tripartite invitation. She participated in the Women's 76 kg category finishing 10th.

She previously won the 2019 Oceania Youth Championships at 64 kg and competed at the 2019 IWF Junior World Championships with the 5th best lift in the clean-and-jerk.
