= Sled Dowabobo =

Nauruan judoka

Personal information
- Nationality: Nauru
- Born: 31 March 1983
- Occupation: Judoka
- Height: 5 ft 9 in (174 cm)
- Weight: 161 lb (73 kg)

Sport
- Sport: Judo

Profile at external databases
- JudoInside.com: 72356

Sled Tavare Dowabobo (born 31 March 1983) is a Nauruan judoka. He participated at the 2012 Summer Olympics in the Men's 73 kg event, but was eliminated in the first round by Navruz Jurakobilov of Uzbekistan.
