= Nauru Athletics Association =

Governing body of athletics in Nauru

Athletics Nauru
- Sport: Athletics
- Jurisdiction: Association
- Abbreviation: AN
- Founded: 1967
- Affiliation: IAAF
- Affiliation date: 1968
- Regional affiliation: OAA
- Headquarters: Aiwo District
- President: Hansome Adumur
- Vice president: Charmi Depaune
- Secretary: Richie Halstead
- Replaced: Nauru Amateur Athletic Association

Official website
- www.foxsportspulse.com/assoc_page.cgi?c=2-1146-0-0-0
- (Nauru)

The Athletics Nauru (AN), also known as Nauru Athletics Association (NAA), is the governing body for the sport of athletics in Nauru.

== History ==
AN was founded in 1967 as Nauru Amateur Athletic Association (NAAA) and was affiliated to the IAAF in 1968.

As of March 2025, the AN president and general secretary were Ken Blake and Leona Waidabu, respectively.

== Affiliations ==
AN is the national member federation for Nauru in the following international organisations:

- International Association of Athletics Federations (IAAF)
- Oceania Athletic Association (OAA)

Moreover, it is part of the following national organisations:

- Nauru Olympic Committee (NNOC)

== National records ==
AN maintains the Nauruan records in athletics.
