= Gerard Garabwan =

Nauruan weightlifter

Gerard Darrien Garabwan (10 March 1971) is a former weightlifter who competed for Nauru at the 1996 Summer Olympic Games.

He was a plumber when he was picked to represent his nation at the Olympics, he had already competed at the 1995 World Cup in China and finished 33rd. After he finished 24th at the Olympics he went on to finish 8th at the 1998 Commonwealth Games in Malaysia.
