= Jonah Harris =

Nauruan track and field athlete

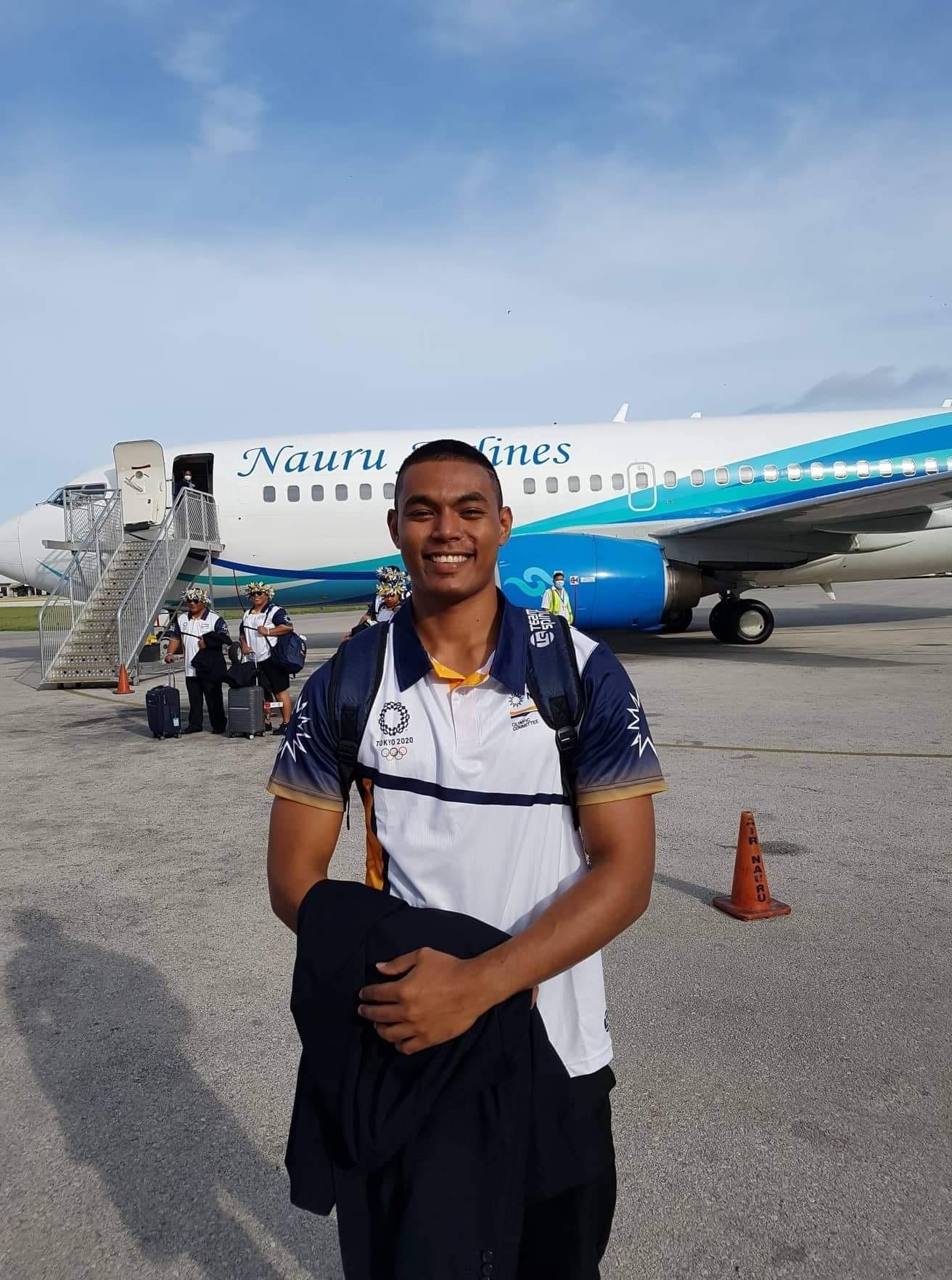

Personal information
- Born: 16 January 1999 (age 27) Nauru
- Height: 1.78 m (5 ft 10 in)
- Weight: 74 kg (163 lb)

Sport
- Country: Nauru
- Sport: Track and field
- Events: 100 metres, 200 metres

Achievements and titles
- Personal bests: 100m – 10.82s (2019); 200m – 21.96s (2018)
Medal record
Men's athletics
Representing Nauru
Micronesian Games
Gold medal – first place	2018 Yap	100 m
Gold medal – first place	2018 Yap	Long jump
Silver medal – second place	2018 Yap	200 m
Silver medal – second place	2018 Yap	High jump
Bronze medal – third place	2018 Yap	Triple jump

Jonah Harris (born 16 January 1999) is a Nauruan track and field athlete who specializes in the 100 metres and the 200 metres.

Harris most notably represented Nauru at the 2018 Commonwealth Games in Gold Coast, Australia and was the first ever athlete representing Nauru at the 2020 Summer Games in Tokyo. He currently holds the national records for Nauru in the 60 metres indoor event, the 100 metres and the 200 metres and has one more national record still awaiting ratification from the Nauru Athletics Association (NAA).

== 2016–17 ==
Prior to the 2017 Pacific Mini Games, the only competitions Harris had experience with was school meets in Queensland and only achieving a personal best time of 11.94 seconds. The 2017 Pacific Mini Games would act as his first international competition in which he would compete in the 100 metres event. The event featured the likes of Nazmie-Lee Marai from Papua New Guinea and Kelvin Masoe from Samoa. Harris was drafted in race three with Masoe during the heats phase coming fifth with a time of 11.12 seconds. Harris hadn't initially qualified, but the four best times of the losers advanced through to the next round, Harris was the second fastest loser so therefore qualified. The top eight from the semifinals qualified through for the finals, Harris finished fourth in heat 2, but with a time of 10.98 seconds, he didn't qualify for the finals. As a result, Harris achieved the highest ranking 100 m sprinter for Nauru at the games, over his counterparts Joshua Jeremiah and Dysard Dageago, plus, he set a new personal best and national record.

On the 17 June 2017, Harris also set a new personal best for his Long jump while practicing in Gold Coast with a distance of 6.42 metres. Harris also set a new outdoor 60 metre personal best of 7.03 seconds.

== 2018 ==
Harris' first event of the 2018 season was the 2018 IAAF World Indoor Championships in which he ran the 60 metres event. Harris ran in heat one, lane eight. Amidst the likes of Christian Coleman, Harris managed to run the race in 7.03 seconds, a new national record for Nauru and Harris. Despite this time, Harris was unable to advance through to the later rounds as a fastest loser.

At the 2018 Commonwealth Games, Harris represented Nauru in the 100 m and 200 m. For the 100 metre event, Harris was drafted into heat three and raced on April 8. Harris was in lane seven and ran the race in 10.95 coming fifth, a new national record, but this time wasn't fast enough to qualify to the quarterfinals. In his 200-metre run, Harris was drafted into heat one, once again, Harris came fifth with a time of 21.96 seconds. This time beat out the 2017 Pacific Mini Games 200 m champion Nazmie-Lee Marai who ran 0.18 seconds behind Harris in 22.14 seconds. This time was also a national record but once again, couldn't qualify Harris through to the later rounds of competition.

At the 2018 IAAF World U20 Championships, Harris ran the 100 m event. He was drafted into heat five and after running 11.11 seconds, ranked a respective 38th overall during the heats. This ranking wasn't enough to qualify him for the semifinals and ultimately, the finals.

Harris' most recent international competition was the 2018 Micro Games in Yap, Micronesia. The Nauru Athletics Association originally had a team of 55 competitors going to the games. However, three days prior to the competition starting, the NAA approached the organizers stating that the estimated cost of travelling to the games would be $300,000, too much for them to afford so they would have to withdraw from the competition. Harris was still competing in Tampere at the U20 Championships when he heard the news. Harris had already booked his ticket so he would be the sole competitor for the Nauru team. Harris' first event was the 100 metres. He qualified through the heats with a time of 10.32 seconds running in heat one. In the finals, Harris' biggest challenger was Olympic athlete, Rodman Teltull from Palau. In the end, Harris won the finals by .03 seconds over Teltull to take the gold medal. In the 200 metres, Harris would once again be facing Teltull. Harris ran the distance in 23.21 seconds finishing third after the heats, third behind Teltull and Chuuk's Scott Fiti but still advanced to the finals. In the finals, Harris this time beat Fiti who ran 22.76 seconds, but came second to Teltull who ran 21.88 seconds. Harris himself ran 22.22 seconds. Next for Harris was the long jump, as there was no qualifying round for the long jump, Harris went straight to the finals. He jumped 6.33 metres, beating the next closest athlete, Buraieta Yeeting of Kiribati, by 0.25 metres. The high jump ran similarly to the long jump, and during the event five athletes were unable to make a jump height. The remaining four athletes, including Harris, battled for the medals. Harris finished second jumping 1.85 metres, a personal best. His height was six centimetres short of that of Lataisi Mwea. Harris' final event was the triple jump. Harris jumped 12.09 metres which was enough to gain Harris the bronze medal. This distance was 74 centimetres behind the first-place finisher Biira Burennaira. Harris walked away from the games with two golds, two silvers and two bronze medals.

== 2018 and 2019 ==
He established 2 new national sprint records of Nauru:

- 100 m: 10.82 (+0.5) in Apia (SAM) 16 JUL 2019 NR at the 2019 Pacific Games
- 200 m: 21.96 (−0.4) in Gold Coast (AUS) 10 APR 2018 NR at 2018 Commonwealth Games.

== 2021 ==
Harris will be the first ever Nauru athlete (track and field) participating to the 2020 Olympic Games, since first participation of Nauru in 1996. World Athletics secured for him an universality place for running the 100 m preliminary round.
