= Sheeva Peo =

Nauruan weightlifter

Personal information
- Born: 7 November 1976 (age 49)
- Height: 1.7 m (5 ft 7 in)
- Weight: 90 kg (200 lb)

Sport
- Country: Nauru
- Sport: Weightlifting

Sheeva Ramanda Peo-Cook (7 November 1976) was the inaugural woman to compete at the Olympics for Nauru when she entered weightlifting at the super heavyweight class in the 2000 Summer Olympics, where she finished 10th.
