= Quincy Detenamo =

Nauruan weightlifter

Quincy Saul Detenamo (born 8 March 1979) was an Olympic weightlifter who was found guilty of manslaughter in Australia.

== Biography ==
Quincy Detenamo was born in Buada, Nauru. He was one of only a few athletes who represented his country at the 1996 Summer Olympics. He competed as a weightlifter when his weight was 168 pounds. He was in the middleweight weightlifting team and his cousin, Itte Detenamo, also competed at a later Olympics.

Detenamo was placed 20th overall at the 1996 Atlanta Summer Games in the Men's Middleweight division.

Detenamo also competed in 1998 World Weightlifting Championships – Men's 77 kg division. The championship took place in Lahti, Finland and he was placed 22nd.

In 2002 Detenamo was at the Commonwealth Games in Manchester but was placed 14th.

In 2005 he was found guilty following the death of Grace Ilardi, a 39-year-old prostitute on 17 July 2004. Her post mortem indicated that she had been beaten and strangled and he was charged with murder but he was eventually convicted of manslaughter. Detenamo had left the country following the murder but was arrested when he returned.

Detenamo showed some remorse, but he was sentenced to nine years and assured that he would serve seven of these.
