= Yukio Peter =

Nauruan weightlifter

Personal information
- Born: January 29, 1984 (age 42)
- Height: 1.61 m (5 ft 3 1/2 in)
- Weight: 69 kg (152 lb)

Sport
- Country: Nauru
- Sport: Weightlifting
Medal record
Representing Nauru
Men's weightlifting
Commonwealth Games
Gold medal – first place	2010 Delhi	77 kg weightlifting

Yukio Stinson Peter (born 29 January 1984 in Aiwo) is a weightlifter from Nauru.

== Career ==
=== 2004 ===
Yukio snatched 142.5 kg and clean and jerked 165 kg (total 307.5 kg) to place eighth at the 2004 Olympic Games in the Men's 69 kg division. It is the best position ever for a Nauruan athlete at the Olympic Games.

=== 2008 ===
In December 2008, Yukio won a gold medal in the Commonwealth Weightlifting Championships in Limassol, Cyprus. Competing in the 77 kg category, he snatched 145 kg and clean and jerked 185 kg.

=== 2010 ===
At the 2010 Commonwealth Games in New Delhi, India, Yukio Peter won Nauru's 10th gold medal-winning the 77kg division in weightlifting with a new Games record of 333 kg.

=== 2011 ===
Peter won gold in the 77 kg category at the Arafura Games in 2011 in Darwin - Nauru's first gold at that edition of the Games.
