= Winzar Kakiouea =

Nauruan sprinter (born 2001)

Personal information
- Full name: Winzar Jedidiah Shadrack Kakiouea
- Born: 30 April 2001 (age 25) Nauru
- Height: 174 cm (5 ft 9 in)

Sport
- Country: Nauru
- Sport: Athletics
- Event: 100 metres
Medal record
Micronesian Games
Gold medal – first place	2024 Majuro	100 m
Gold medal – first place	2024 Majuro	200 m
Gold medal – first place	2024 Majuro	4 x 100 m relay
Bronze medal – third place	2024 Majuro	4 x 400 m relay
Micronesian Championships
Silver medal – second place	2018 Saipan	4 x 100 m relay

Winzar Jedidiah Shadrack Kakiouea (born 30 April 2001) is a Nauruan sprinter. He qualified for the 2024 Summer Olympics and was the only Nauruan selected.

== Biography ==
Kakiouea was born on 30 April 2001 in Nauru. He is of the Iruwa tribe. Nauru, with a population of around 10,000, is the world's third-smallest country and does not have a single racetrack, only what Kakiouea called a "dirt oval". He grew up in the country and won a national powerlifting competition, also being one of Nauru's top Australian rules football players, although he told The New York Times his accomplishments were "not so impressive. Nauru is very small." Outside of sport, he works as a telecom cable repairman.

Kakiouea competed at the 2018 Melanesian Championships in Athletics, placing fifth in the 100 metres, and won a silver medal at the 2018 Micronesian Championships in the 4 × 100 metres relay. He also participated in the 100 metres at the 2019 Oceania Athletics Championships, placing fourth. He holds the national record in the event and began training regularly in 2021; The New York Times noted that:

[Nauru's] smallness—most everyone knows each other, or at least a cousin or two—compelled Kakiouea to hide his training regimen, lest people gossip about his ambitions. He stayed away from the dirt oval and went instead into the forested hills, where he shared an earthen straightaway with the occasional car. He had no coach, but a cousin came often to time him. To fortify his body, he ate crab and noddy, a kind of tropical seabird. He fished and sliced the flesh into sashimi slabs.

Kakiouea was selected to compete in the 100m at the 2023 World Athletics Championships, where he was the sole Nauruan participating and served as the nation's flag bearer. Later that year, he competed at the Pacific Games in three events, winning a bronze medal in the 100m. In March 2024, he competed in the 60 metres at the 2024 World Athletics Indoor Championships in Glasgow; he trained in Australia to prepare for the competition, purchasing his only pair of running shoes, pink Nike cleats, for 240 Australian dollars.

In June 2024, Kakiouea participated at the 2024 Micronesian Games and won four medals—three gold and one bronze. There, he achieved his personal best in the 100m while winning gold, with a time of 10.82 seconds. The following month, he received a universality selection to compete for Nauru at the 2024 Summer Olympics, being the only Nauruan chosen. At the time, he had a world ranking of 3,701. As the only Nauruan at the games, he served as the nation's flag bearer at the opening ceremony, joined by his coach and two team officials. He finished sixth in his heat of the preliminary round in the men's 100 metres with a time of 11.15s and did not advance.
