= Talha Talib =

Pakistani weightlifter (born 1999)

Personal information
- Native name: طلحہ طالب
- Full name: Talha Talib
- Nationality: Pakistan
- Born: 3 October 1999 (age 26) Gujranwala, Punjab, Pakistan
- Education: Superior College, Gujranwala
- Years active: 2015-2021; 2025-present
- Height: 1.72 m (5 ft 8 in)
- Weight: 79 kg (174 lb)

Sport
- Country: Pakistan
- Sport: Weightlifting
- Weight class: 79 kg
- Coached by: Muhammad Islam Natiq
Medal record
Men's weightlifting
Representing Pakistan
Event	1st	2nd	3rd
World Championships	–	–	1
Asian Championships	–	–	1
Commonwealth Games	–	–	1
Commonwealth Championships	–	1	–
Commonwealth Youth Games	–	1	–
South Asian Games	1	–	–
IWF International Solidarity Championships	4	2	–
Total	5	4	3
World Championships
Bronze medal – third place	2021 Tashkent	67 kg snatch
Asian Championships
Bronze medal – third place	2020 Tashkent	67 kg snatch
Commonwealth Games
Bronze medal – third place	2018 Gold Coast	62 kg
Commonwealth Championships
Silver medal – second place	2017 Gold Coast	62 kg
Commonwealth Youth Games
Silver medal – second place	2015 Apia	56 kg
South Asian Games
Gold medal – first place	2019 Kathmandu	67 kg
IWF International Solidarity Championships
Gold medal – first place	2020 Tashkent	67 kg snatch
Gold medal – first place	2020 Tashkent	67 kg clean and jerk
Gold medal – first place	2020 Tashkent	67 kg total
Gold medal – first place	2018 Cairo	67 kg snatch
Silver medal – second place	2018 Cairo	67 kg clean and jerk
Silver medal – second place	2018 Cairo	67 kg total
- Updated on 10 June 2025

Talha Talib (Urdu: طلحہ طالب) (born 3 October 1999) is a Pakistani weightlifter from Gujranwala. Talha made history by finishing fifth at the 2020 Tokyo Olympics, delivering one of the best Olympic performances by a Pakistani weightlifter in decades. This was Pakistan's first top 5 position at the Olympics since 1988 in sports other than field hockey. Talha also earned Pakistan’s inaugural World Weightlifting Championships medal in Tashkent 2021, taking bronze in the 67 kg snatch with a 143 kg lift.

In 2021, Talha tested positive for the banned steroid 19-norandrosterone in two separate tests, and received a three-year ban from January 25, 2022, to January 24, 2025. With his suspension now over, Talha is eligible to return to competition. He is set to compete in the 79 kg category going forward and is expected to participate in upcoming national and international events.

== Early life and education ==
Talib began training from the age of eight in his hometown of Gujranwala, Pakistan. His father, Muhammad Islam Natiq, was a former National Junior Weightlifting Champion and had won a bronze medal at the 1999 Asian Powerlifting Championships in New Delhi. He worked as a national weightlifting coach for Pakistan, and was the one who introduced Talib to the sport.

Talib passed his matriculation from Quaid-e-Azam Divisional Public School and College, and then studied computer science from Superior College, Gujranwala.

== Career ==
Talha Talib won the silver medal in the 56 kg category at the 2015 Commonwealth Youth Games in Samoa. He lifted 102 kg in snatch and 115 kg in clean and jerk for an aggregate of 217 kg. In October 2016, he participated in the IWF Youth World Championships in Penang, where he could only achieve 9th position in the 62 kg category. The next week, at the 2016 Commonwealth Youth Championships in Penang, he claimed silver in the 62 kg category, and was named Best Weightlifter.

He competed at the 2018 Commonwealth Games and won a bronze medal in the 62 kg category, lifting a total of 283 kg at the age of 18.

In December 2018, Talha competed at the 5th International Solidarity Weightlifting Championship held in Cairo, Egypt, in the 67 kg category. He won a gold medal in the snatch with a lift of 136 kg, along with silver medals in the clean & jerk (155 kg) and total (291 kg).

At the 2019 South Asian Games, Talib won gold in 67 kg category with a total weight of 292 kg (140 kg in snatch and 152 kg in clean and jerk).

In February 2020, he participated in the 6th International Solidarity Weightlifting Championship in Tashkent, Uzbekistan, again in the 67 kg division. Talib delivered a dominant performance, securing three gold medals by lifting 142 kg in the snatch, 162 kg in the clean & jerk, and achieving a total of 304 kg.

In April 2020, at the 49th Asian Weightlifting Championships, he won a bronze medal by lifting 148 kg in snatch in 67 kg event.

He was brought into the national limelight at the following Olympics, where he finished fifth in the men's 67 kg event. Initially, Talib could not qualify directly for the event since he had missed a few events. However, he secured an invitational spot offered by the Tripartite Commission. At the event, Talib's lift of 151 kg in the snatch category was the second-best of the round. His overall tally of 320 kg was just 2 kg shy of the bronze medal. This was Pakistan's first top 5 position at the Olympics since 1988 in sports other than field hockey.

In the 2021 World Weightlifting Championships in Tashkent, Talib won the bronze medal in the 67 kg category by lifting 143 kg in the snatch event. This was Pakistan's first-ever medal at the World Weightlifting Championships.

However, later that same year, Talib tested positive for norandrosterone, a banned performance-enhancing drug, and received a three-year ban.

== Awards and recognition ==
For securing fifth position in the men's 67 kg event at 2020 Summer Olympics, Talha was awarded the following:

- Rs. 25 lakh (US$8,900) from the WAPDA.
- Rs. 20 lakh (US$7,200) from the Chief Minister of Punjab.
- Rs. 10 lakh (US$3,600) from the President of Pakistan.
- Rs. 10 lakh (US$3,600) from the Punjab Sports Board.
- Rs. 10 lakh (US$3,600) from the Government of Punjab.
