= Caner Toptaş =

Turkish weightlifter (born 2001)

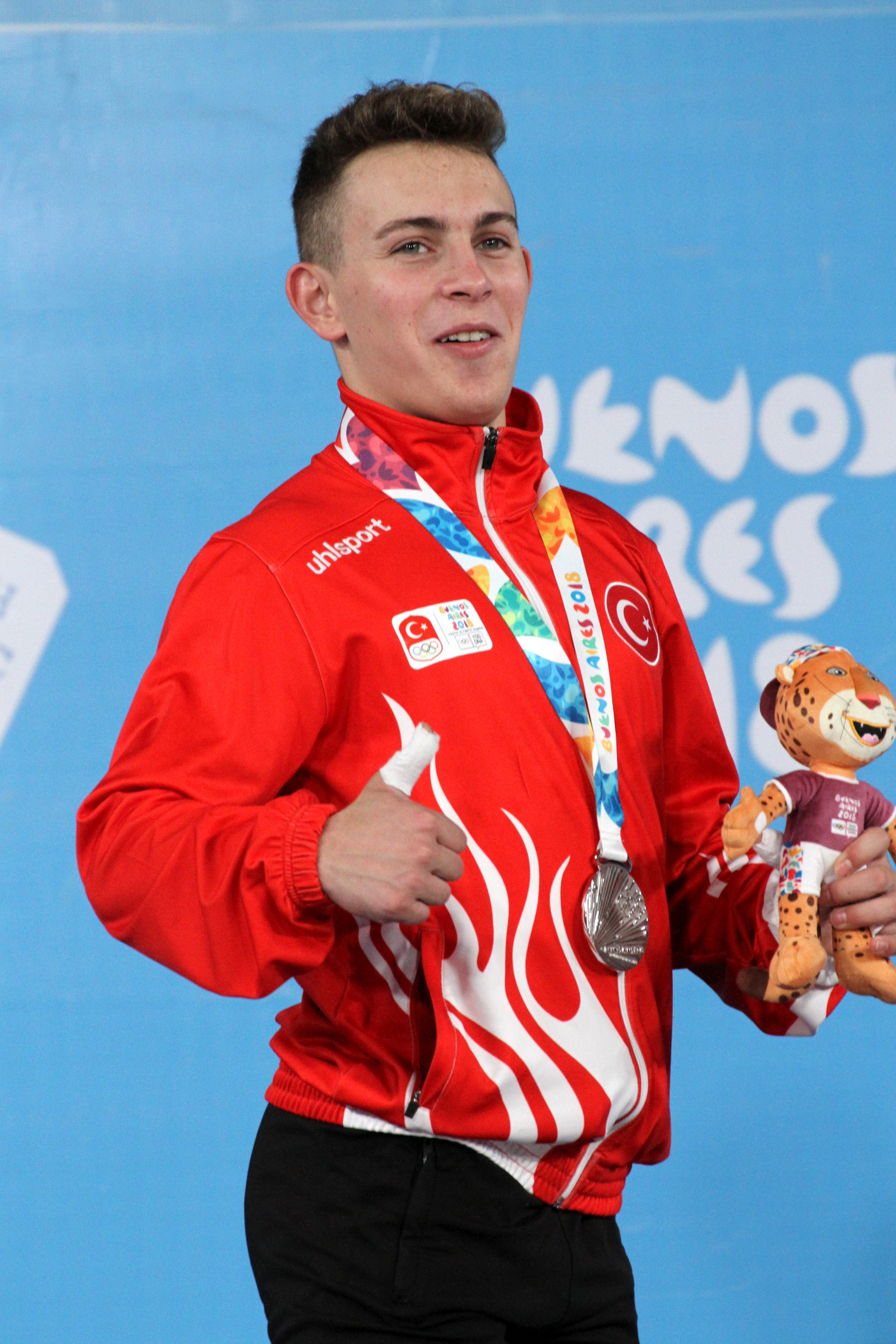
- Caner Toptaş in 2018

Personal information
- Born: 14 August 2001 (age 24)

Sport
- Country: Turkey
- Sport: Weightlifting
Medal record
Men's weightlifting
Representing Turkey
Summer Youth Olympics
Silver medal – second place	2018 Buenos Aires	62 kg
Youth World Weightlifting Championships
Bronze medal – third place	2017 Bangkok	56 kg
European Youth Weightlifting Championships
Gold medal – first place	2017 Pristina	56 kg
Silver medal – second place	2018 San Donato Milanese	62 kg

Caner Toptaş (born 14 August 2001) is a Turkish weightlifter. He won the silver medal in the 62 kg event at the 2018 Summer Youth Olympics held in Buenos Aires, Argentina.

At the 2017 European Junior & U23 Weightlifting Championships held in Durrës, Albania, he won the silver medal in the men's 56 kg event. In 2019, he won the gold medal in the men's 61 kg event at the Junior World Weightlifting Championships held in Suva, Fiji.
