= Weightlifting at the 2018 Summer Youth Olympics – Boys' 62 kg =

Boys' 62 kg at the III Summer Youth Olympic Games
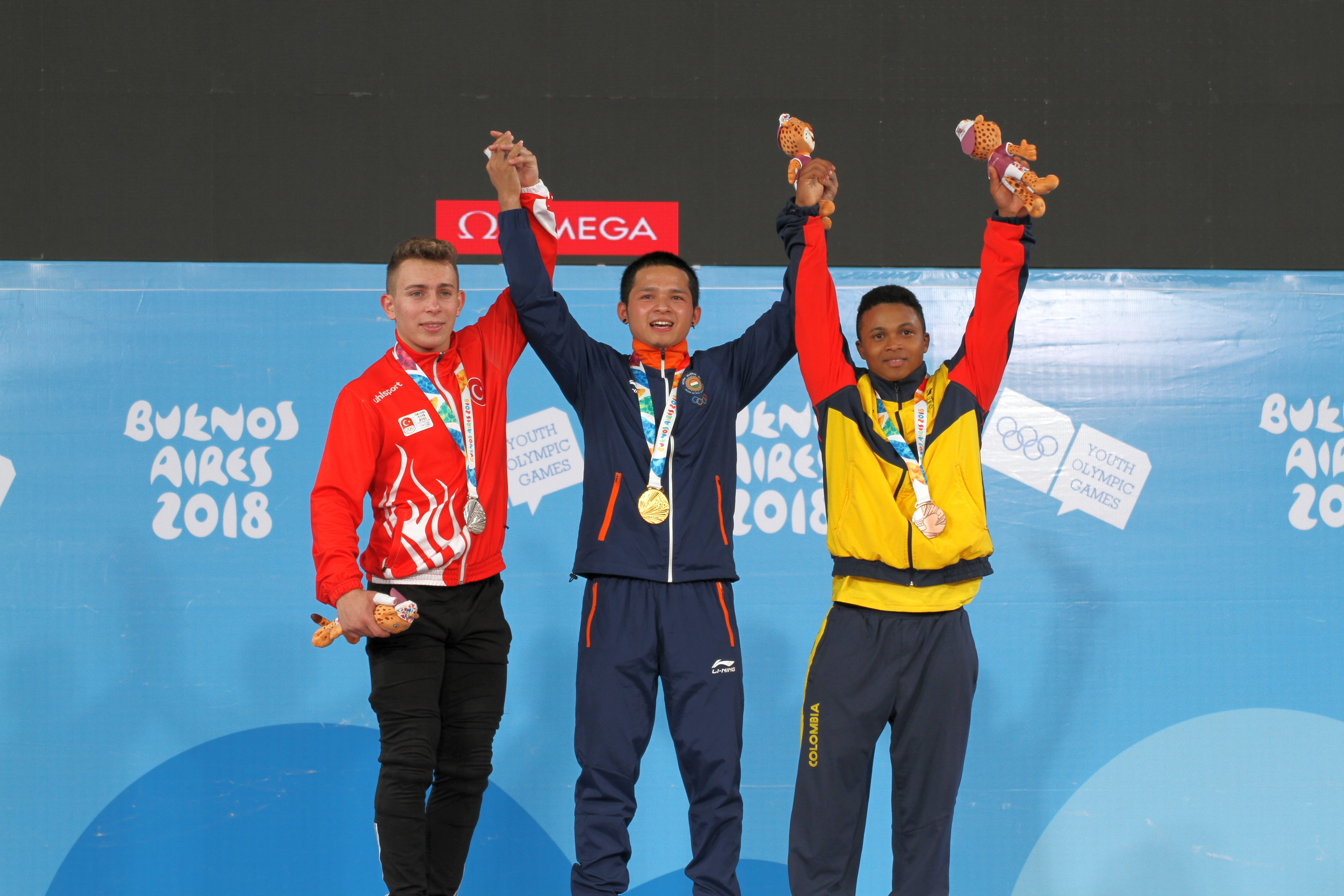
- Podium at victories ceremony
- Venue: Parque Polideportivo Roca
- Dates: 8 October
- Competitors: 14 from 14 nations
- Winning total: 274 kg

Medalists
1st place, gold medalist(s)		Jeremy Lalrinnunga	India
2nd place, silver medalist(s)		Caner Toptaş	Turkey
3rd place, bronze medalist(s)		Estiven Villar	Colombia

These are the results for the boys' 62 kg event at the 2018 Summer Youth Olympics.

== Results ==
Rank	Name	Nation	Body Weight	Snatch (kg)				Clean & Jerk (kg)				Total (kg)
Rank	Name	Nation	Body Weight	1	2	3	Res	1	2	3	Res	Total (kg)
1st place, gold medalist(s)	Jeremy Lalrinnunga	India		120	~~124~~	124	124	142	~~147~~	150	150	274
2nd place, silver medalist(s)	Caner Toptaş	Turkey		116	~~120~~	122	122	135	~~141~~	141	141	263
3rd place, bronze medalist(s)	Estiven Villar	Colombia		110	115	~~118~~	115	140	145	~~149~~	145	260
4	Emanuel Danciu	Romania		110	~~115~~	115	115	138	143	~~146~~	143	258
5	Carlos Trejo	Venezuela		115	~~118~~	~~118~~	115	130	140	~~144~~	140	255
6	Ronnier Martínez	Panama		110	114	~~117~~	114	141	~~145~~	~~147~~	141	255
7	Ezekiel Moses	Nauru		105	~~110~~	~~110~~	105	126	130	~~138~~	130	235
8	Reýimbergen Jumaýew	Turkmenistan		105	109	~~113~~	109	125	~~128~~	-	125	234
9	Antonino Luli	Albania		95	~~100~~	~~100~~	95	115	120	125	125	220
10	Richárd Orsós	Hungary		~~90~~	90	95	95	110	~~116~~	116	116	211
11	Jack Dorian Madanamoothoo	Mauritius		87	92	~~96~~	92	~~110~~	110	116	116	208
12	Jett Gaffney	Australia		80	84	88	88	106	112	~~121~~	112	200
13	Joshua Ralpho	Marshall Islands		75	80	~~85~~	80	~~100~~	103	110	110	190
14	Hamdan Lutaaya Sserwanga	Uganda		60	64	67	67	76	80	83	83	150

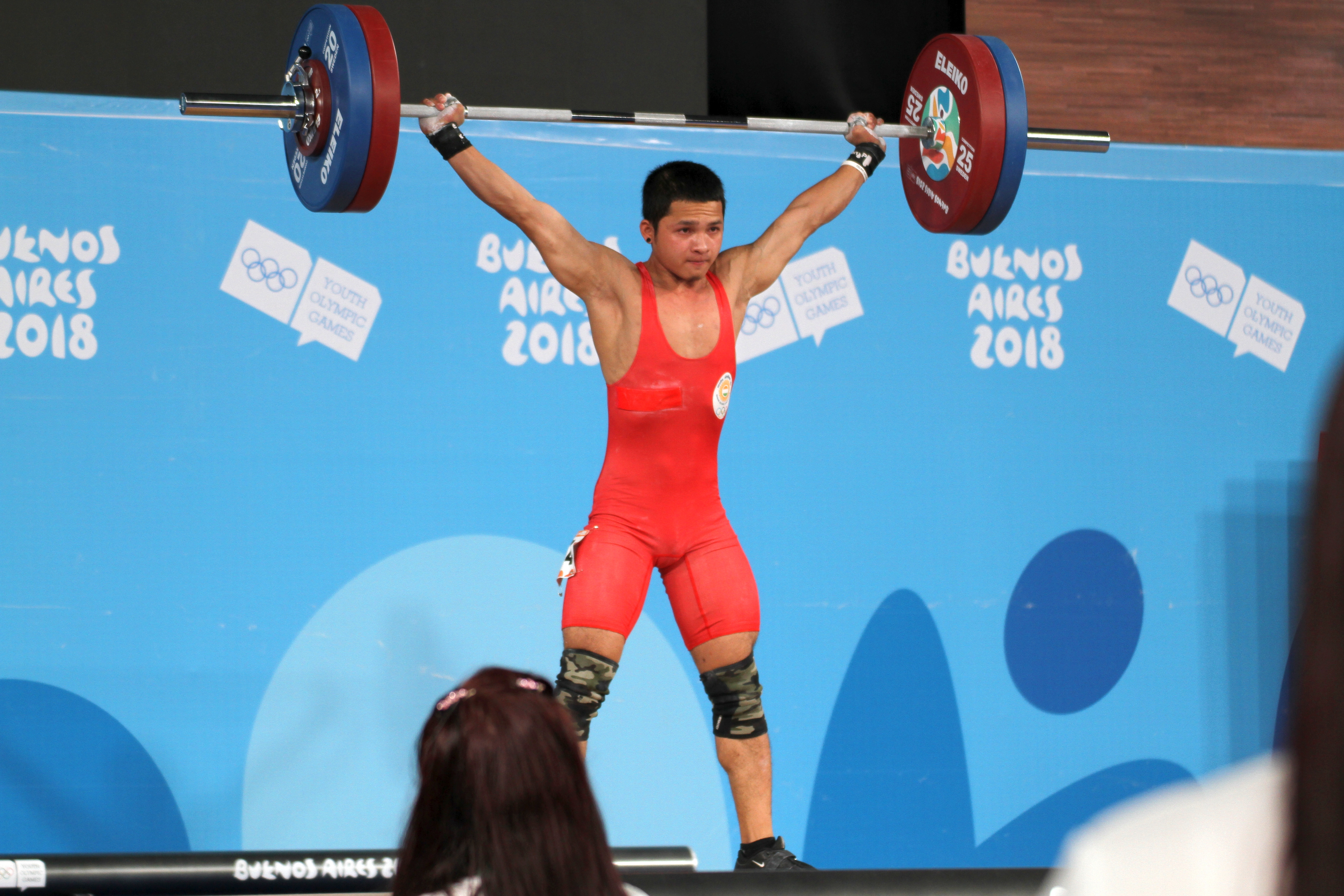
Jeremy Lalrinnunga

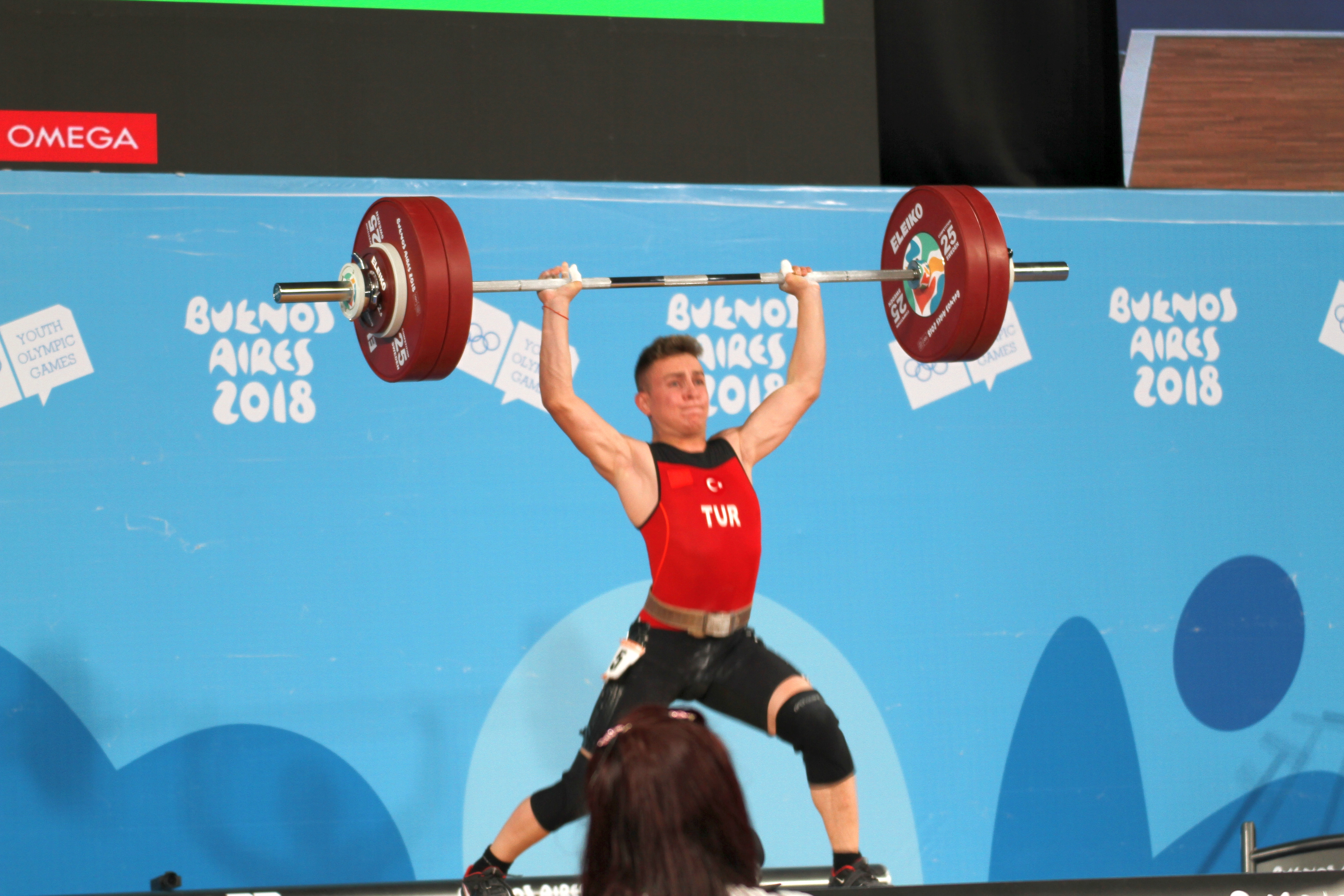
Caner Toptaş

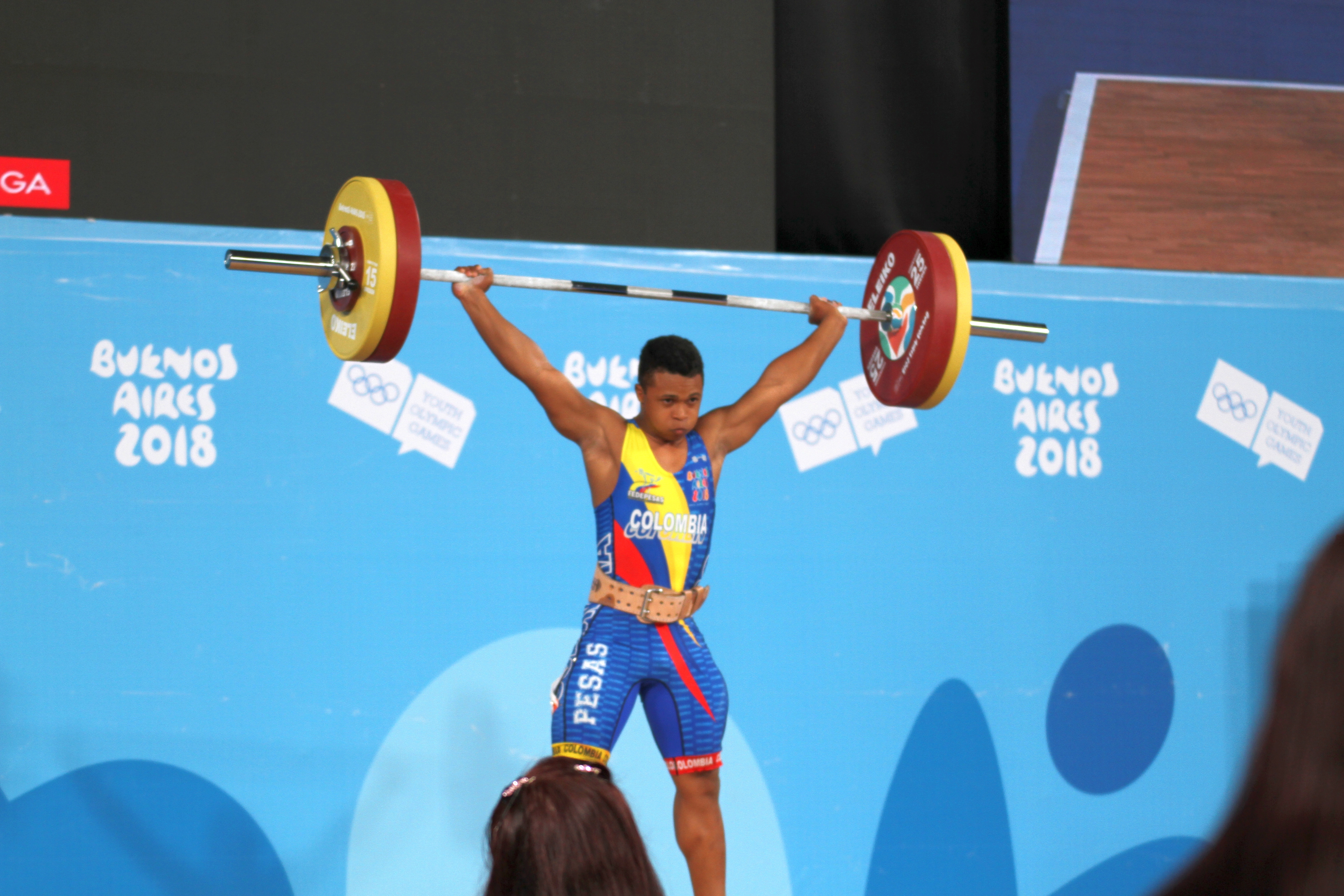
Estiven Jose Villar Manjarrés

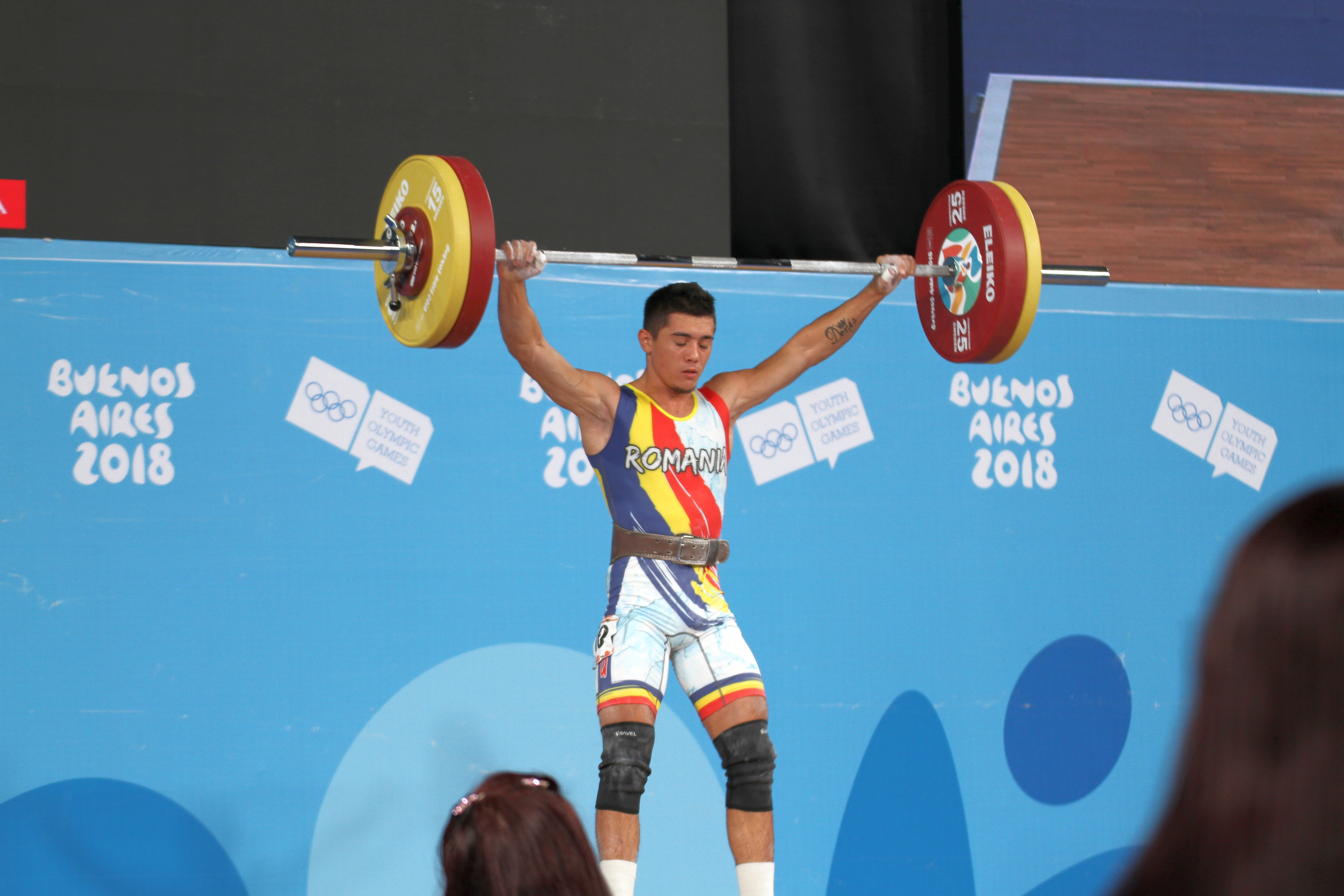
Emanuel Marian Danciu

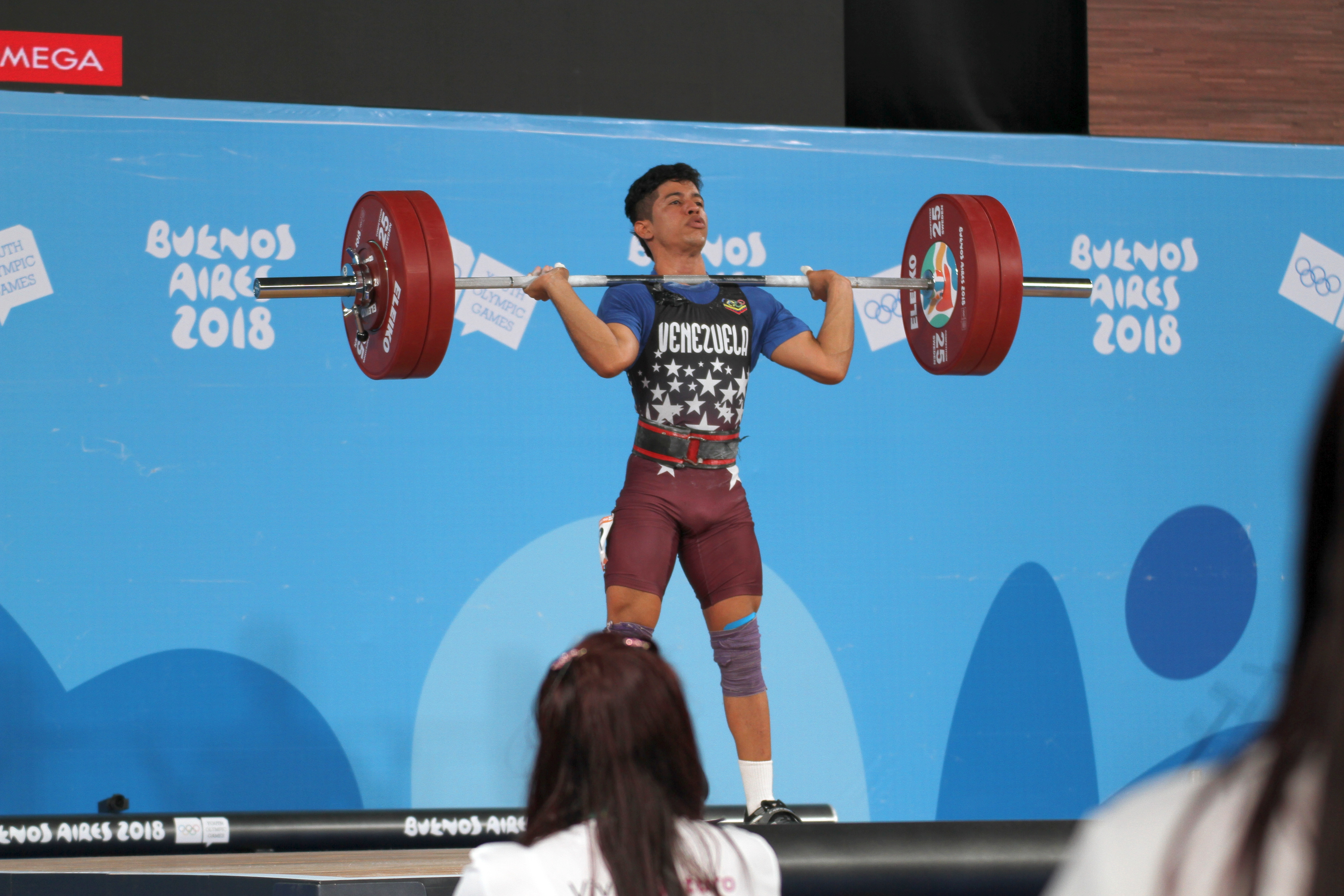
Carlos David Trejo Gonzalez

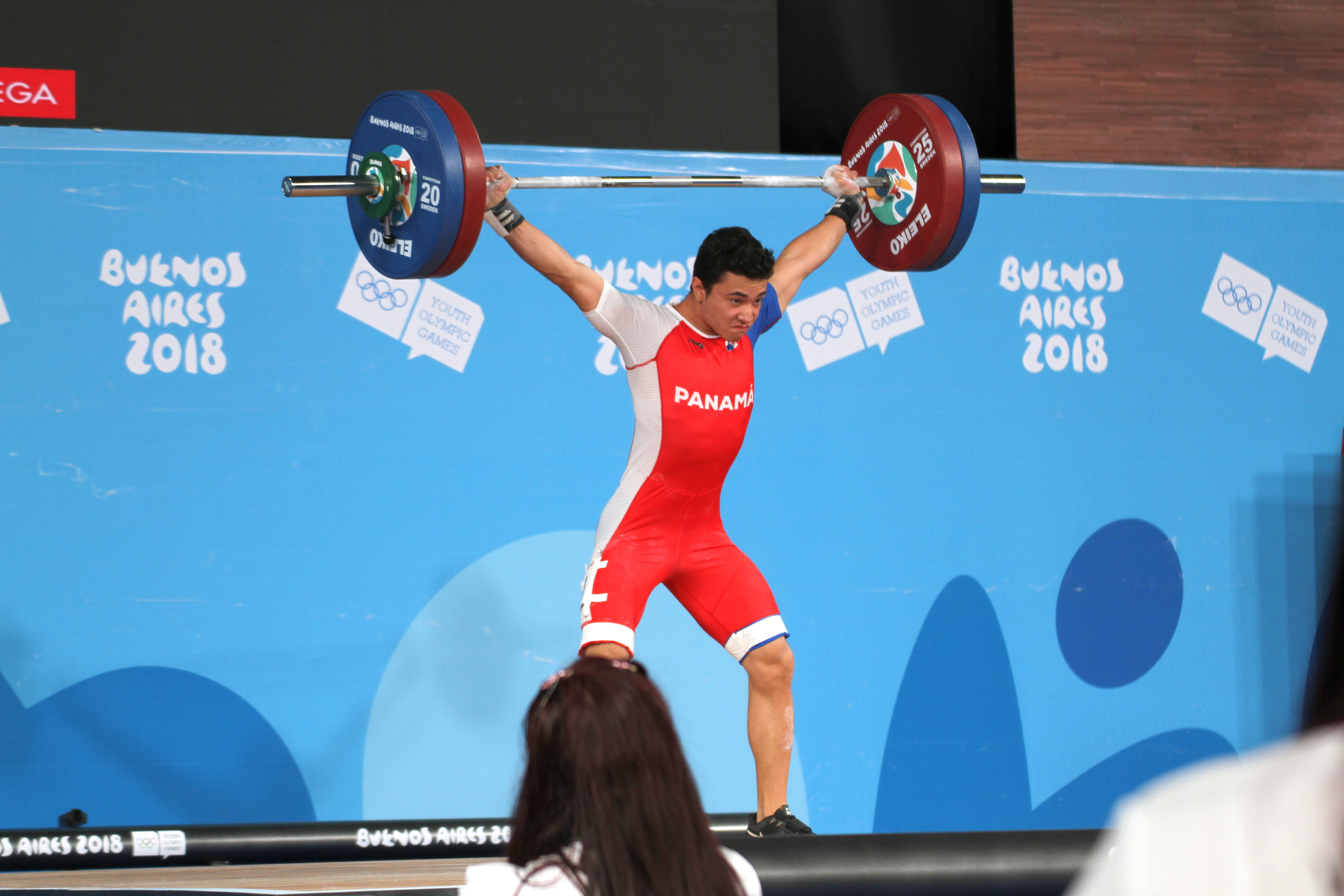
Ronnier Martínez

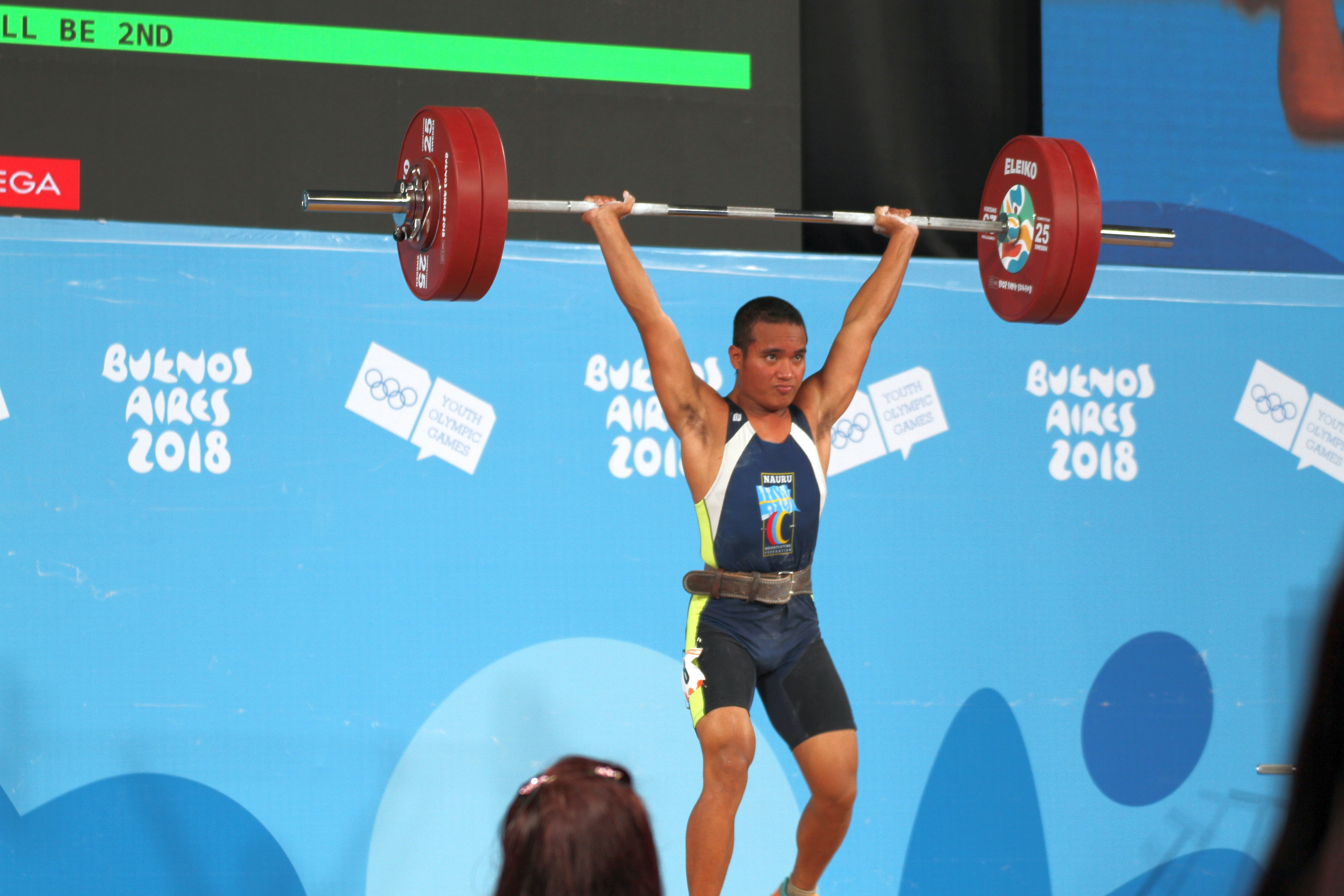
Ezekiel Moses

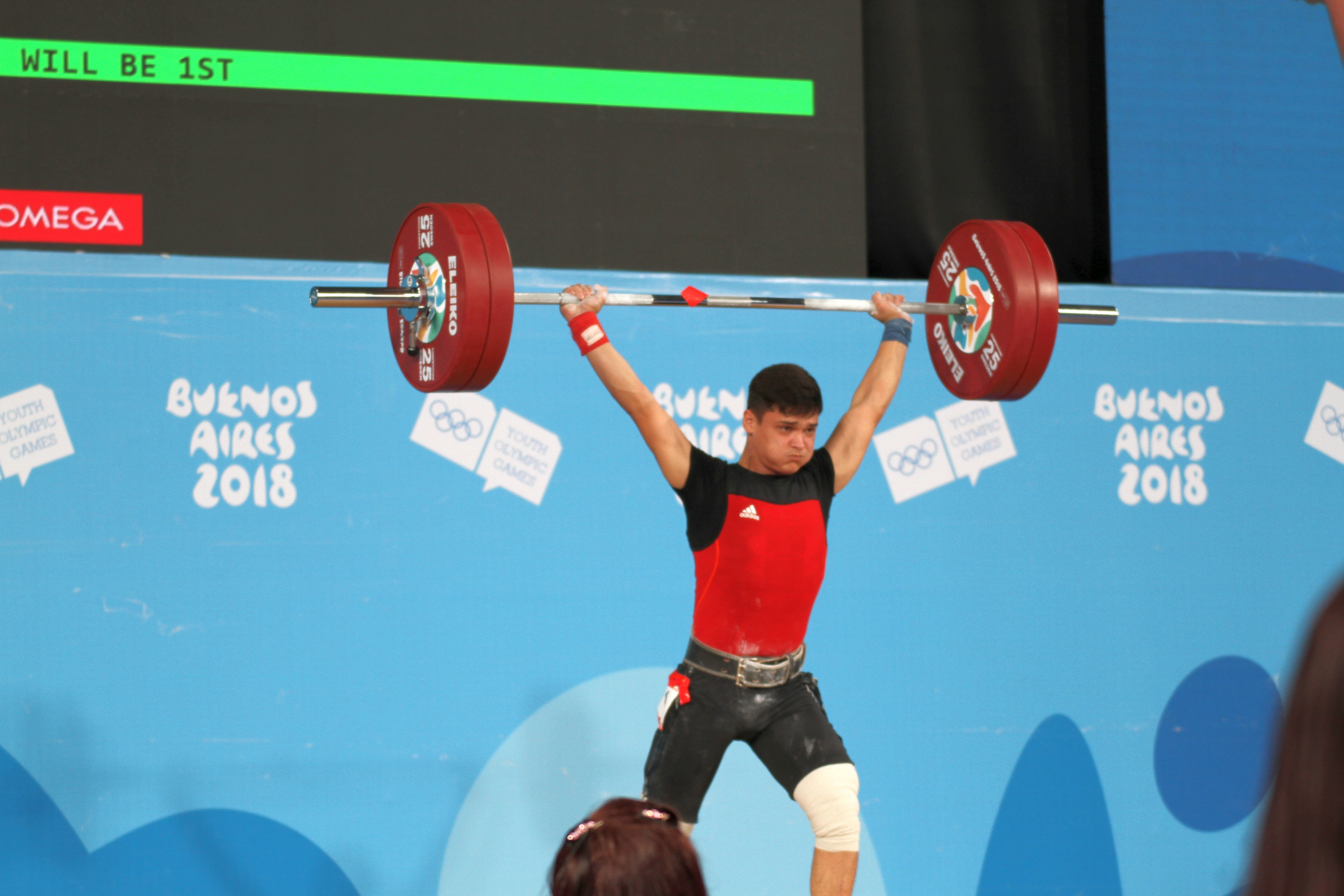
Reyimbergen Jumayev

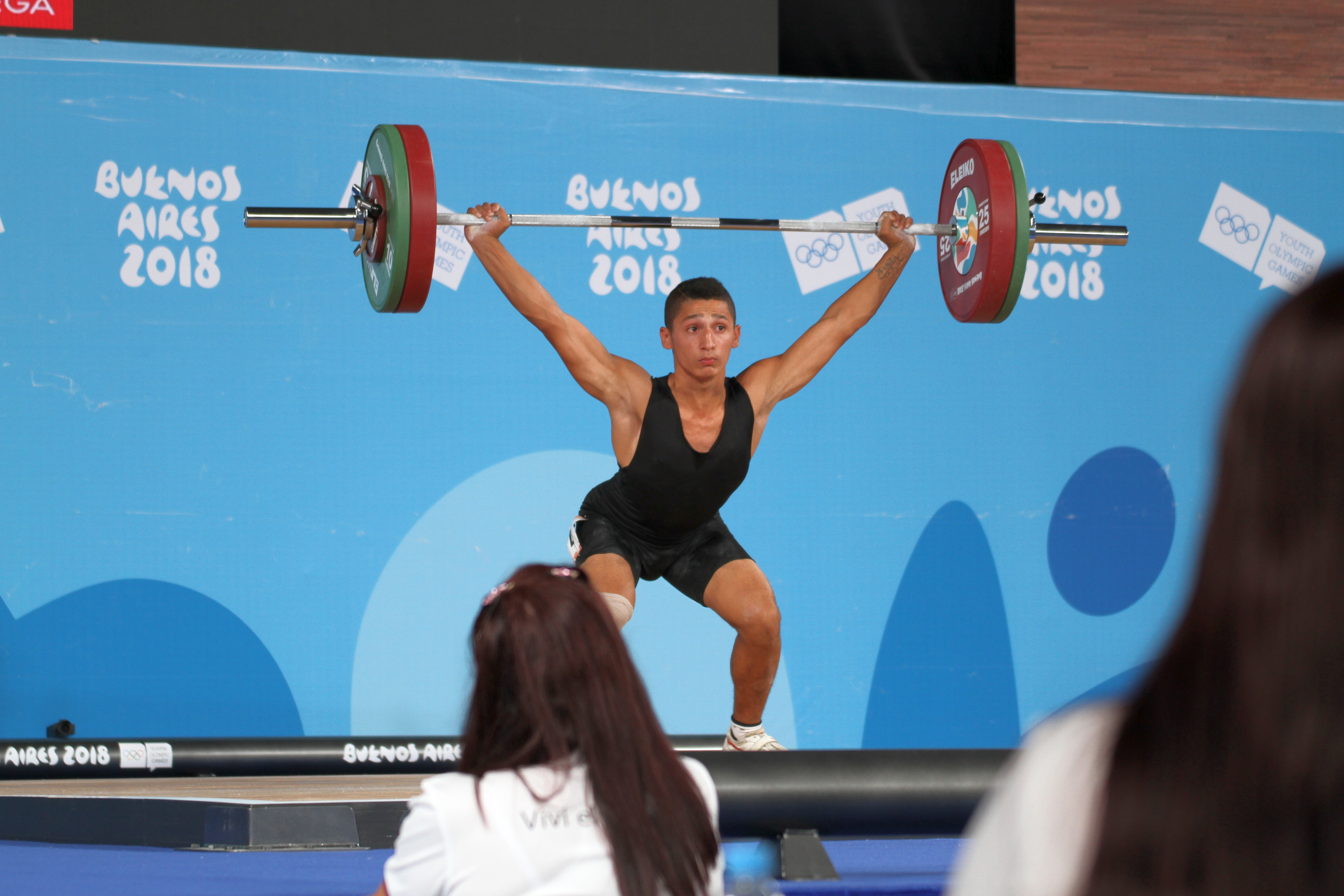
Antonino Luli

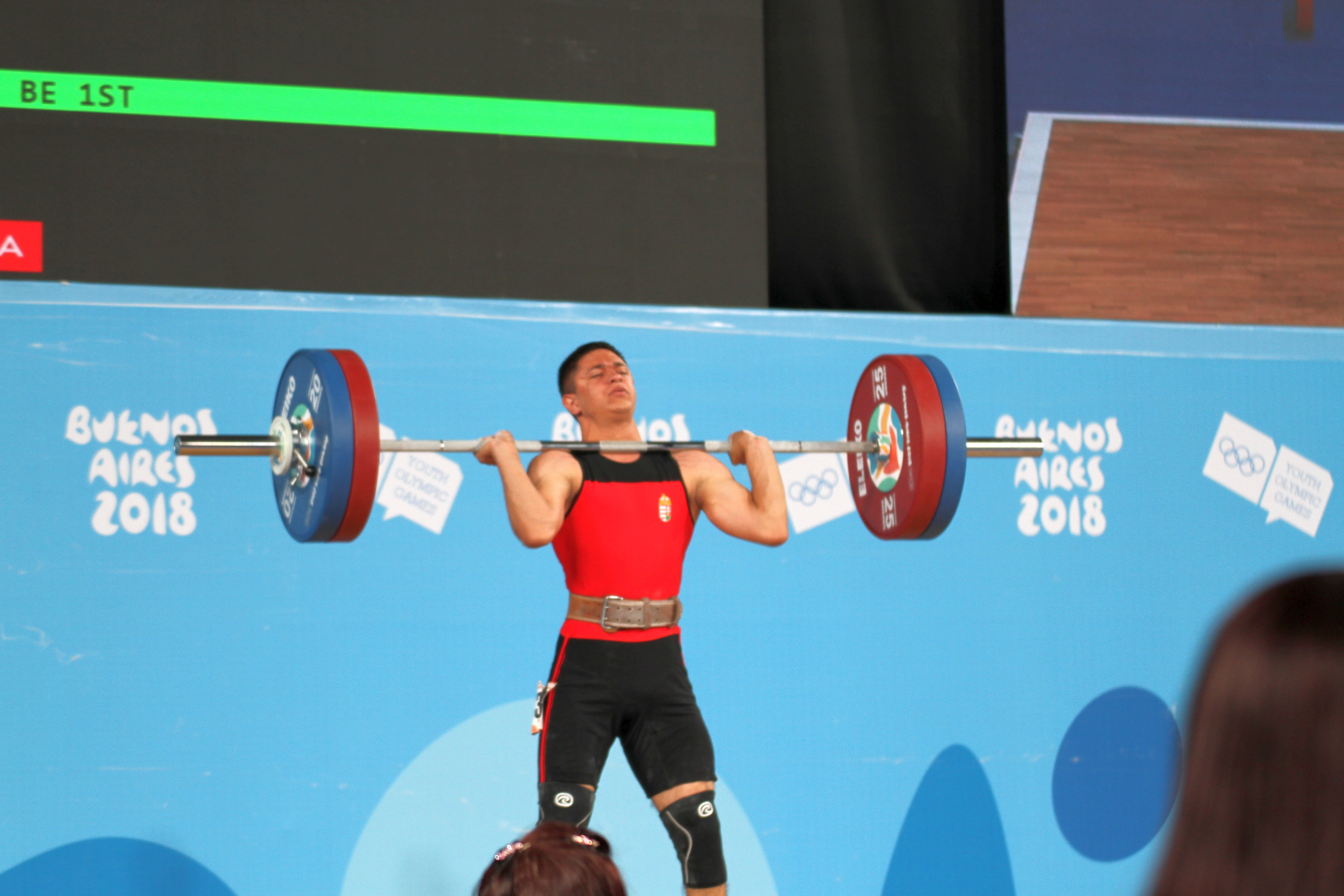
Richárd Orsós

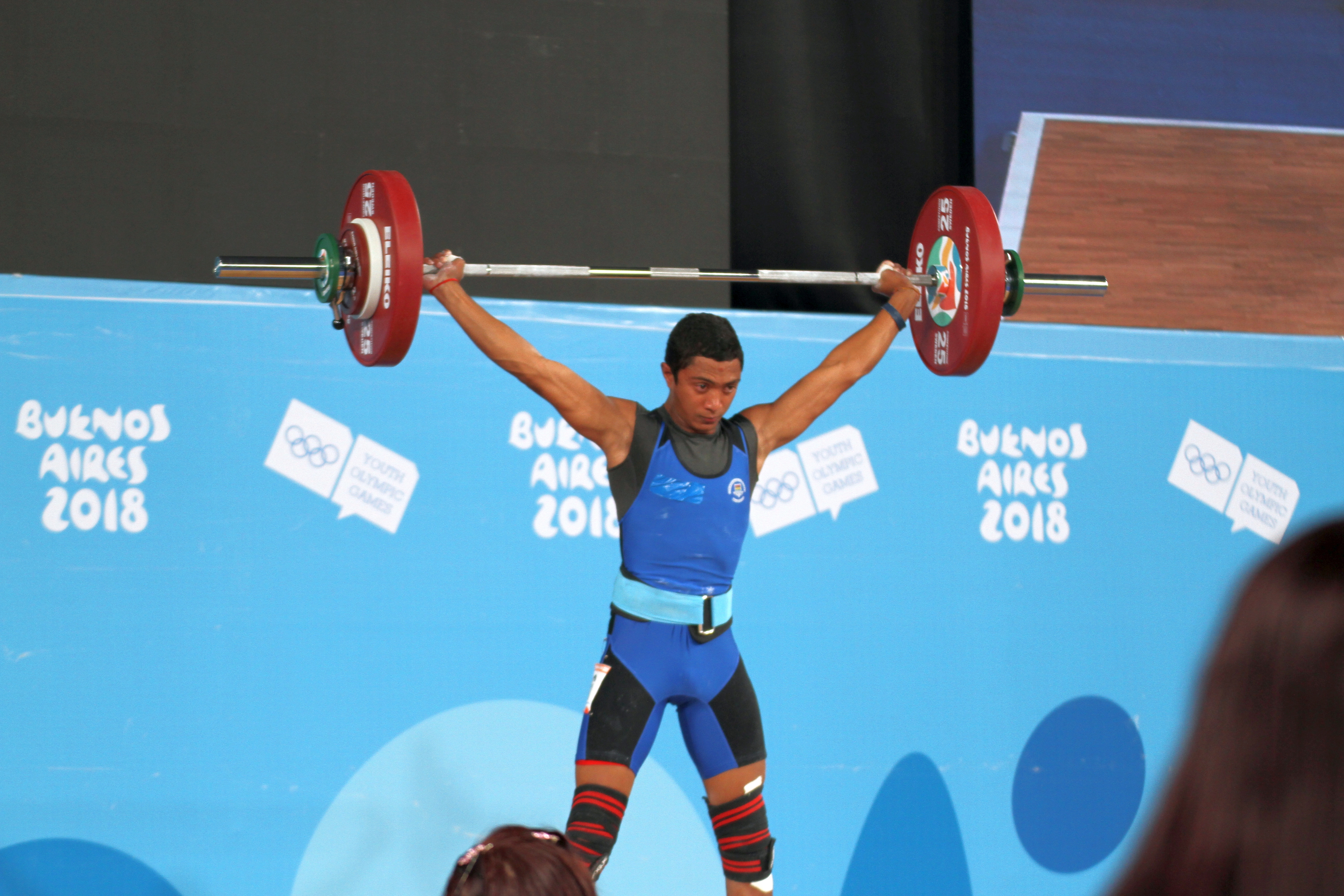
Jack Dorian Madanamoothoo

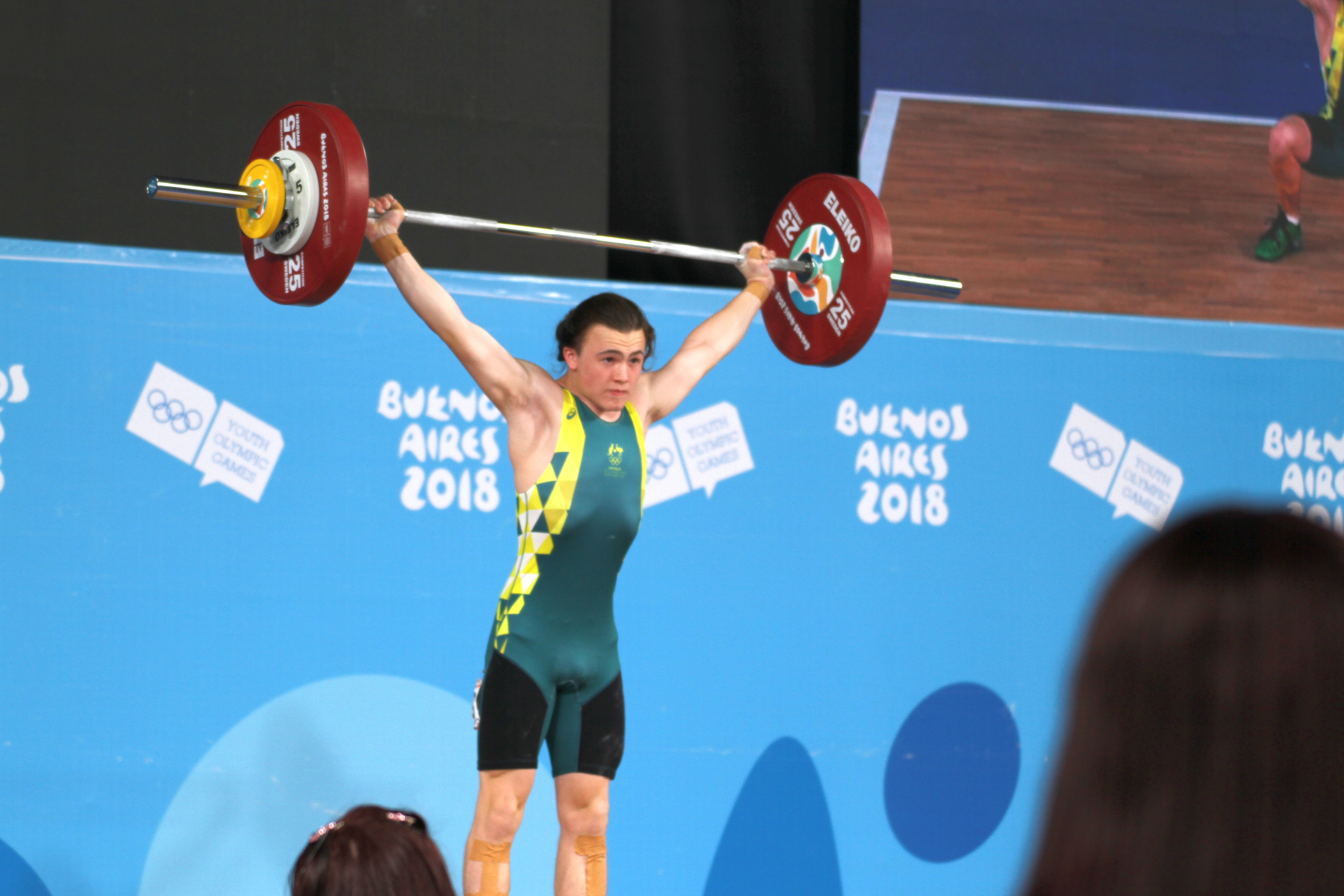
Jett Gaffney

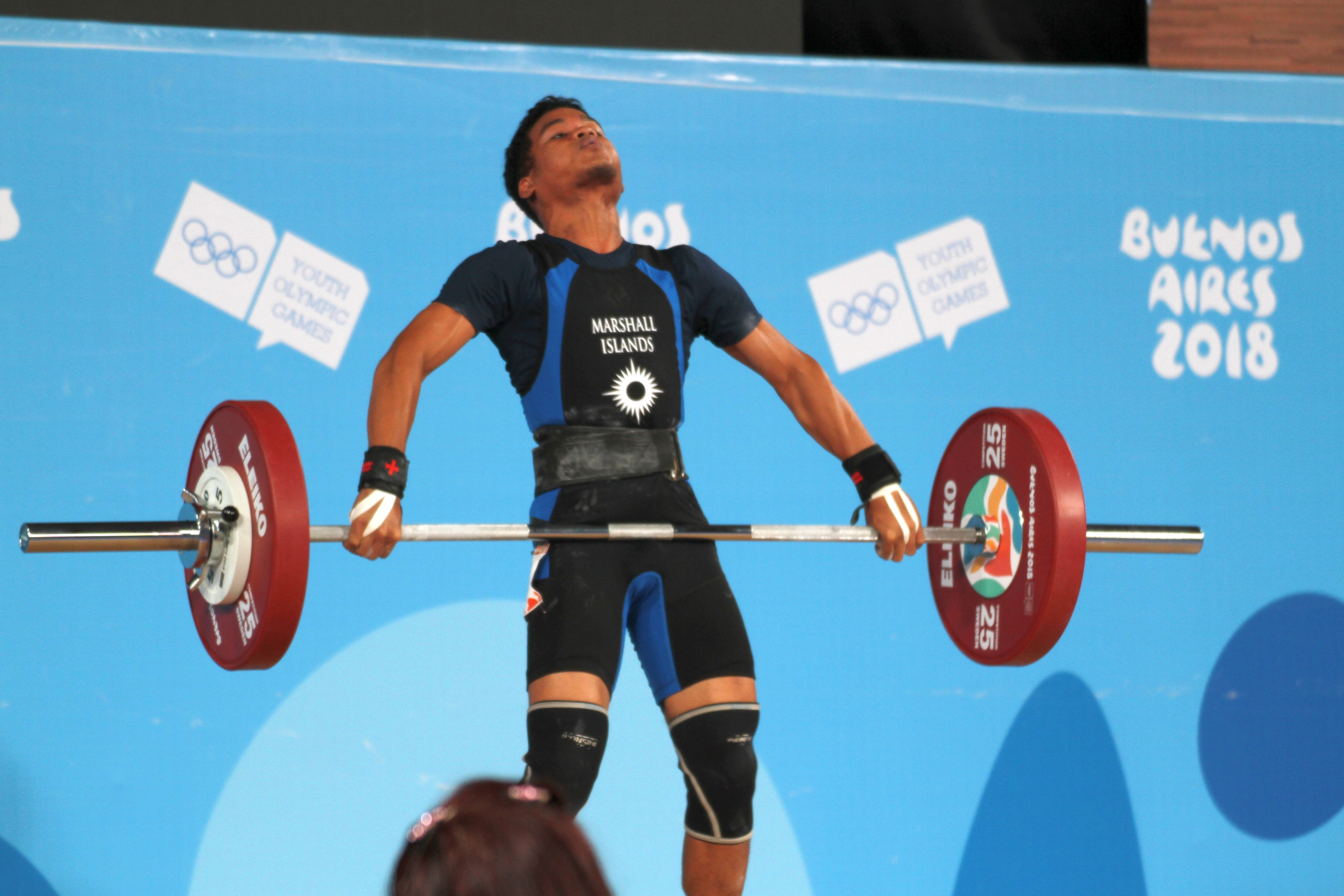
Joshua Ralpho

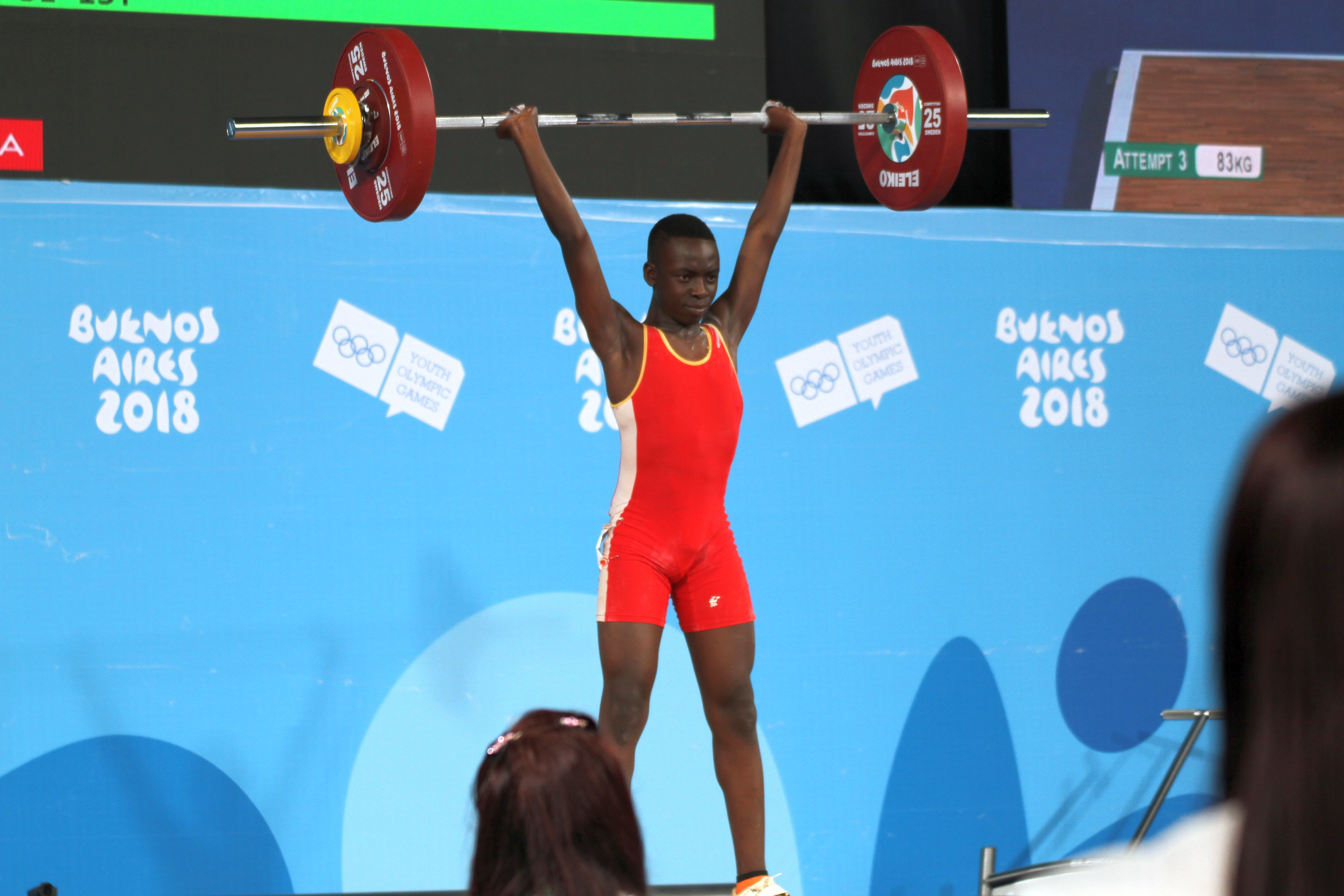
Lutaaya Sserwanga
