= IWF International Solidarity Championships =

- Patrons: IWF, ACNOA, Gateway KSA, OIC
- Organised by: Islamic Solidarity Sports Federation

The IWF Solidarity Championships Is an annual Olympic Weightlifting competition held in different countries each year.

== Host Countries ==
Edition	Year	Location
1st	2012	Saudi Arabia
2nd	2014	Uganda
3rd	2015	Turkey
4th	2016	Amman, Jordan
5th	2018	Cairo, Egypt
6th	2020	Tashkent, Uzbekistan
