= 2010 World Weightlifting Championships – Men's +105 kg =

The men's competition in the super-heavyweight (+105 kg) division was held on 25 and 26 September 2010.

== Schedule ==
Date	Time	Event
25 September 2010	20:30	Group C
26 September 2010	13:00	Group B
26 September 2010	16:00	Group A

== Medalists ==
Event	Gold		Silver		Bronze	
Snatch	Evgeny Chigishev (RUS)	210 kg	Behdad Salimi (IRI)	208 kg	Artem Udachyn (UKR)	205 kg
Clean & Jerk	Matthias Steiner (GER)	246 kg	Behdad Salimi (IRI)	245 kg	Jeon Sang-guen (KOR)	242 kg
Total	Behdad Salimi (IRI)	453 kg	Matthias Steiner (GER)	440 kg	Artem Udachyn (UKR)	440 kg

== Records ==
Prior to this competition, the existing world records were as follows.

World Record	Snatch	Hossein Rezazadeh (IRI)	213 kg	Qinhuangdao, China	14 September 2003
World Record	Clean & Jerk	Hossein Rezazadeh (IRI)	263 kg	Athens, Greece	25 August 2004
World Record	Total	Hossein Rezazadeh (IRI)	472 kg	Sydney, Australia	26 September 2000

== Results ==
Rank	Athlete	Group	Body weight	Snatch (kg)				Clean & Jerk (kg)				Total
Rank	Athlete	Group	Body weight	1	2	3	Rank	1	2	3	Rank	Total
1st place, gold medalist(s)	Behdad Salimi (IRI)	A	162.01	203	208	~~211~~	2nd place, silver medalist(s)	241	245	~~247~~	2nd place, silver medalist(s)	453
2nd place, silver medalist(s)	Matthias Steiner (GER)	A	146.07	190	194	~~196~~	5	233	241	246	1st place, gold medalist(s)	440
3rd place, bronze medalist(s)	Artem Udachyn (UKR)	A	158.13	195	201	205	3rd place, bronze medalist(s)	235	~~242~~	—	5	440
4	Jeon Sang-guen (KOR)	A	158.89	~~185~~	185	~~190~~	13	230	~~241~~	242	3rd place, bronze medalist(s)	427
5	Sajjad Anoushiravani (IRI)	A	149.29	~~185~~	185	191	7	~~228~~	228	235	4	426
6	Andrey Kozlov (RUS)	A	147.69	185	190	~~195~~	8	230	~~238~~	~~240~~	6	420
7	Mohamed Ihsan (EGY)	B	149.13	180	186	190	9	221	228	—	7	418
8	An Yong-kwon (KOR)	A	141.25	~~190~~	~~190~~	191	6	225	—	—	9	416
9	Dimitrios Papageridis (GRE)	B	134.72	177	182	185	12	210	215	220	12	405
10	Chen Shih-chieh (TPE)	B	135.85	170	175	~~178~~	18	210	223	226	8	401
11	Yauheni Zharnasek (BLR)	B	142.94	175	~~180~~	180	16	210	215	221	11	401
12	Irakli Turmanidze (GEO)	B	120.36	175	180	185	11	205	210	215	14	400
13	Pat Judge (USA)	B	155.05	165	173	~~178~~	20	~~215~~	215	223	10	396
14	Jiří Orság (CZE)	B	121.84	175	~~180~~	180	15	215	~~221~~	~~225~~	15	395
15	Péter Nagy (HUN)	B	150.25	183	~~190~~	~~191~~	14	~~212~~	212	~~218~~	18	395
16	Kazuomi Ota (JPN)	B	144.10	175	~~180~~	~~180~~	19	210	214	~~221~~	16	389
17	Daniel Dołęga (POL)	B	116.38	173	178	~~183~~	17	202	~~212~~	~~212~~	21	380
18	Julio Arteaga (ECU)	B	133.41	163	168	172	21	207	~~217~~	~~220~~	20	379
19	George Kobaladze (CAN)	C	126.17	~~162~~	~~162~~	165	24	212	~~218~~	~~218~~	17	377
20	Petr Hejda (CZE)	B	137.22	158	163	~~166~~	26	205	210	~~215~~	19	373
21	Egidijus Remėza (LTU)	B	108.50	165	170	~~175~~	22	200	~~207~~	~~207~~	22	370
22	Ondrej Kružel (SVK)	C	129.83	157	163	~~168~~	25	199	~~205~~	~~207~~	24	362
23	Christian López (GUA)	C	120.43	~~165~~	165	~~171~~	23	190	~~196~~	196	25	361
24	Chao Shih-chieh (TPE)	C	138.42	~~160~~	160	~~165~~	28	195	~~203~~	~~203~~	26	355
25	Collin Ito (USA)	C	130.81	146	~~150~~	~~152~~	31	191	196	200	23	346
26	Fernando Reis (BRA)	C	122.98	~~155~~	~~155~~	155	29	~~190~~	190	—	27	345
27	Teemu Roininen (FIN)	C	138.46	145	149	152	30	190	~~196~~	~~197~~	28	342
28	Sandeep Kumar (IND)	C	114.28	132	137	141	33	175	180	183	29	324
29	Rupinder Singh (IND)	C	112.57	137	145	~~150~~	32	175	~~180~~	~~180~~	30	320
30	William Ainslie (RSA)	C	133.97	127	133	~~138~~	34	165	~~170~~	170	31	303
—	Evgeny Chigishev (RUS)	A	133.96	202	207	210	1st place, gold medalist(s)	~~240~~	~~241~~	~~241~~	—	—
—	Viktors Ščerbatihs (LAT)	A	132.36	190	195	200	4	~~231~~	~~232~~	~~235~~	—	—
—	Almir Velagić (GER)	A	138.13	186	~~191~~	~~191~~	10	—	—	—	—	—
—	Lasha Talakhadze (GEO)	C	130.34	157	~~162~~	162	27	~~180~~	~~180~~	—	—	—
—	Ihor Shymechko (UKR)	A	136.14	~~200~~	~~200~~	~~201~~	—	220	~~230~~	~~231~~	13	—
