= Weightlifting at the 2010 Asian Games – Men's +105 kg =

Men's +105 kg at the 2010 Asian Games
- Venue: Dongguan Arena
- Date: 19 November 2010
- Competitors: 11 from 7 nations

Medalists
gold medal	Behdad Salimi	Iran
silver medal	Jeon Sang-guen	South Korea
bronze medal	Sajjad Anoushiravani	Iran

The men's +105 kilograms event at the 2010 Asian Games took place on 19 November 2010 at Dongguan Arena.

== Schedule ==
All times are China Standard Time (UTC+08:00)

Date	Time	Event
Friday, 19 November 2010	13:00	Group B
Friday, 19 November 2010	19:00	Group A

== Records ==
Prior to this competition, the existing world, Asian and Games records were as follows.

World Record	Snatch	Hossein Rezazadeh (IRI)	213 kg	Qinhuangdao, China	14 September 2003
World Record	Clean & Jerk	Hossein Rezazadeh (IRI)	263 kg	Athens, Greece	25 August 2004
World Record	Total	Hossein Rezazadeh (IRI)	472 kg	Sydney, Australia	26 September 2000
Asian Record	Snatch	Hossein Rezazadeh (IRI)	213 kg	Qinhuangdao, China	14 September 2003
Asian Record	Clean & Jerk	Hossein Rezazadeh (IRI)	263 kg	Athens, Greece	25 August 2004
Asian Record	Total	Hossein Rezazadeh (IRI)	472 kg	Sydney, Australia	26 September 2000
Games Record	Snatch	Hossein Rezazadeh (IRI)	200 kg	Busan, South Korea	10 October 2002
Games Record	Clean & Jerk	Hossein Rezazadeh (IRI)	240 kg	Busan, South Korea	10 October 2002
Games Record	Total	Hossein Rezazadeh (IRI)	440 kg	Busan, South Korea	10 October 2002

== Results ==
Rank	Athlete	Group	Body weight	Snatch (kg)				Clean & Jerk (kg)				Total
Rank	Athlete	Group	Body weight	1	2	3	Result	1	2	3	Result	Total
1st place, gold medalist(s)	Behdad Salimi (IRI)	A	156.41	~~201~~	201	205	205	235	~~241~~	~~241~~	235	440
2nd place, silver medalist(s)	Jeon Sang-guen (KOR)	A	157.08	180	190	~~195~~	190	230	238	~~251~~	238	428
3rd place, bronze medalist(s)	Sajjad Anoushiravani (IRI)	A	150.19	185	191	195	195	226	232	~~237~~	232	427
4	An Yong-kwon (KOR)	A	140.29	190	~~200~~	~~200~~	190	226	~~237~~	~~237~~	226	416
5	Chen Shih-chieh (TPE)	A	139.05	171	176	~~178~~	176	215	225	~~227~~	225	401
6	Mohammad Ali (SYR)	B	117.89	165	170	175	175	210	221	225	225	400
7	Kazuomi Ota (JPN)	B	143.68	173	178	~~182~~	178	202	~~210~~	210	210	388
8	Qais Assad (SYR)	B	117.68	170	~~180~~	~~182~~	170	~~210~~	210	~~210~~	210	380
9	Chao Shih-chieh (TPE)	B	141.45	~~160~~	160	168	168	~~200~~	200	212	212	380
10	Sarabjit Singh (IND)	B	147.47	150	160	~~171~~	160	180	~~200~~	~~200~~	180	340
11	Hassan Al-Husaini (IOC)	B	111.15	120	130	135	135	145	~~155~~	~~155~~	145	280

== New records ==
The following records were established during the competition.

Snatch	201	Behdad Salimi (IRI)	GR
Snatch	205	Behdad Salimi (IRI)	GR
