= 2011 World Weightlifting Championships – Men's +105 kg =

The men's competition in the super-heavyweight ( +105 kg) division was held on 12–13 November 2011.

== Schedule ==
Date	Time	Event
12 November 2011	14:00	Group D
12 November 2011	21:30	Group C
13 November 2011	11:30	Group B
13 November 2011	16:30	Group A

== Medalists ==
Event	Gold		Silver		Bronze	
Snatch	Behdad Salimi (IRI)	214 kg	Ihor Shymechko (UKR)	200 kg	Sajjad Anoushiravani (IRI)	198 kg
Clean & Jerk	Behdad Salimi (IRI)	250 kg	Sajjad Anoushiravani (IRI)	241 kg	Jeon Sang-guen (KOR)	241 kg
Total	Behdad Salimi (IRI)	464 kg	Sajjad Anoushiravani (IRI)	439 kg	Jeon Sang-guen (KOR)	433 kg

== Records ==
Prior to this competition, the existing world records were as follows.

World Record	Snatch	Hossein Rezazadeh (IRI)	213 kg	Qinhuangdao, China	14 September 2003
World Record	Clean & Jerk	Hossein Rezazadeh (IRI)	263 kg	Athens, Greece	25 August 2004
World Record	Total	Hossein Rezazadeh (IRI)	472 kg	Sydney, Australia	26 September 2000

== Results ==
Rank	Athlete	Group	Body weight	Snatch (kg)				Clean & Jerk (kg)				Total
Rank	Athlete	Group	Body weight	1	2	3	Rank	1	2	3	Rank	Total
1st place, gold medalist(s)	Behdad Salimi (IRI)	A	168.22	201	209	214	1st place, gold medalist(s)	241	250	~~260~~	1st place, gold medalist(s)	464
2nd place, silver medalist(s)	Sajjad Anoushiravani (IRI)	A	149.85	~~193~~	193	198	3rd place, bronze medalist(s)	228	233	241	2nd place, silver medalist(s)	439
3rd place, bronze medalist(s)	Jeon Sang-guen (KOR)	A	157.86	183	192	~~196~~	6	232	241	~~254~~	3rd place, bronze medalist(s)	433
4	Ihor Shymechko (UKR)	A	136.36	195	200	~~203~~	2nd place, silver medalist(s)	~~223~~	223	230	4	430
5	An Yong-kwon (KOR)	A	140.69	183	196	~~198~~	4	~~222~~	222	—	10	418
6	Oleg Proshak (UKR)	A	124.65	180	185	190	7	215	~~222~~	225	8	415
7	Péter Nagy (HUN)	A	154.30	186	192	~~196~~	5	215	223	~~226~~	9	415
8	Almir Velagić (GER)	B	136.94	176	180	183	10	216	221	228	5	411
9	Itte Detenamo (NRU)	A	149.59	175	~~180~~	180	17	222	228	~~232~~	6	408
10	Abdelrahman El-Sayed (EGY)	A	129.71	185	190	~~192~~	8	217	~~225~~	~~226~~	14	407
11	Irakli Turmanidze (GEO)	B	122.90	180	~~185~~	~~188~~	12	210	215	218	13	398
12	Chen Shih-chieh (TPE)	B	136.15	170	~~178~~	~~178~~	24	215	227	—	7	397
13	Hojamuhammet Toýçyýew (TKM)	B	122.75	~~170~~	170	177	18	210	218	~~223~~	12	395
14	Hayk Hakobyan (ARM)	B	127.65	170	180	~~185~~	13	210	215	~~220~~	16	395
15	Dzmitry Vornik (BLR)	C	128.39	170	175	180	14	205	210	215	17	395
16	Fernando Reis (BRA)	C	132.34	170	176	~~181~~	19	207	212	217	15	393
17	Kazuomi Ota (JPN)	B	147.37	177	182	~~185~~	11	211	~~215~~	~~215~~	20	393
18	George Kobaladze (CAN)	C	132.16	165	169	—	25	215	220	—	11	389
19	Lasha Talakhadze (GEO)	B	143.11	175	180	~~187~~	15	~~207~~	207	—	24	387
20	Yauheni Zharnasek (BLR)	B	146.22	175	180	~~183~~	16	~~206~~	206	—	25	386
21	Ondrej Kružel (SVK)	C	121.22	170	175	~~180~~	20	209	~~214~~	~~214~~	21	384
22	Christian López (GUA)	D	134.81	165	170	~~175~~	23	~~202~~	202	207	23	377
23	Dmitriy Kaplin (KAZ)	C	120.25	160	165	168	27	197	205	208	22	376
24	Yoel Morales (VEN)	C	129.44	155	161	~~165~~	31	210	215	~~217~~	18	376
25	Julio Arteaga (ECU)	C	135.84	160	165	~~170~~	29	205	211	~~215~~	19	376
26	Ante Vuković (CRO)	C	128.04	~~165~~	165	170	22	197	202	~~205~~	26	372
27	Igor Olshanetskyi (ISR)	D	124.33	155	161	165	28	196	201	~~202~~	27	366
28	Zach Schluender (USA)	D	119.62	163	~~168~~	168	26	190	197	~~202~~	30	365
29	Damon Kelly (AUS)	C	144.37	160	~~165~~	~~165~~	33	200	~~208~~	~~208~~	28	360
30	Michal Pokusa (SVK)	C	113.80	152	~~157~~	159	34	193	~~197~~	197	29	356
31	Ragnar Öhman (SWE)	C	127.85	~~160~~	160	~~165~~	32	195	~~202~~	~~202~~	31	355
32	Vincas Šlevinskis (LTU)	D	122.32	156	162	~~166~~	30	185	~~190~~	~~190~~	36	347
33	Parminder Phangura (CAN)	D	137.04	151	~~155~~	155	35	~~190~~	~~190~~	190	34	345
34	Teemu Roininen (FIN)	D	128.58	145	~~149~~	~~151~~	39	~~190~~	190	194	32	339
35	Sandeep Kumar (IND)	D	124.68	139	144	148	37	185	190	~~195~~	33	338
36	Artjoms Ivanovs (LAT)	D	108.28	145	~~150~~	~~150~~	38	180	185	~~190~~	35	330
37	Rupinder Singh (IND)	D	114.69	149	~~154~~	~~154~~	36	175	~~180~~	180	37	329
38	Daniel Nemani (NIU)	D	140.71	135	140	~~144~~	40	165	~~172~~	175	38	315
—	Ruben Aleksanyan (ARM)	A	147.23	180	185	—	9	~~240~~	~~240~~	~~240~~	—	—
—	Pat Mendes (USA)	C	130.53	172	~~177~~	~~177~~	21	~~205~~	~~205~~	~~205~~	—	—
—	Jim Gyllenhammar (SWE)	B	125.19	~~170~~	~~171~~	~~171~~	—	—	—	—	—	—
—	Carlos Campos (CRC)	C	127.36	~~166~~	~~166~~	~~166~~	—	—	—	—	—	—
DQ	Chingiz Mogushkov (RUS)	A	184.44	~~192~~	~~192~~	192	—	~~233~~	233	240	—	—

== New records ==
Snatch	214 kg	Behdad Salimi (IRI)	WR
