= Seo Hui-yeop =

South Korean weightlifter (born 1992)

Personal information
- Nationality: Korean
- Born: 29 February 1992 (age 34)
- Weight: 108 kg (238 lb)

Sport
- Sport: Weightlifting
- Event: 109 kg
Medal record
Men's weightlifting
Representing South Korea
Asian Championships
Gold medal – first place	2015 Phuket	105 kg
Silver medal – second place	2017 Ashgabat	105 kg
- Updated on 27 October 2017

Seo Hui-yeop (born 29 February 1992) is a South Korean weightlifter. He is the 2015 Asian champion.

== Career ==
He competed in the men's 105 kg event at the 2015 Asian Weightlifting Championships where he won a gold medal. At the 2017 Asian Weightlifting Championships he won the silver medal in the 105 kg category.

== Major results ==
Year	Venue	Weight	Snatch (kg)				Clean & Jerk (kg)				Total	Rank
Year	Venue	Weight	1	2	3	Rank	1	2	3	Rank	Total	Rank
Representing South Korea
World Championships
2019	Pattaya, Thailand	109 kg	~~170~~	170	~~175~~	19	215	~~219~~	219	11	389	11
2018	Ashgabat, Turkmenistan	109 kg	170	175	~~180~~	13	210	220	~~227~~	7	395	7
2017	Anaheim, United States	105 kg	172	~~177~~	~~177~~	14	216	222	~~228~~	1st place, gold medalist(s)	394	4
2015	Houston, United States	105 kg	170	~~175~~	~~175~~	16	~~215~~	~~215~~	~~215~~	—	—	—
Asian Games
2018	Jakarta, Indonesia	105 kg	~~174~~	~~174~~	174	5	220	~~227~~	~~227~~	3	394	5
Asian Championships
2019	Ningbo, China	109 kg	~~165~~	165	~~176~~	10	210	~~218~~	—	6	375	8
2017	Ashgabat, Turkmenistan	105 kg	170	~~176~~	~~176~~	6	205	~~215~~	220	2nd place, silver medalist(s)	390	2nd place, silver medalist(s)
2016	Tashkent, Uzbekistan	105 kg	170	~~175~~	~~175~~	4	~~216~~	~~216~~	~~216~~	—	—	—
2015	Phuket, Thailand	105 kg	170	—	—	1st place, gold medalist(s)	~~211~~	211	~~221~~	1st place, gold medalist(s)	381	1st place, gold medalist(s)
