= 2017 Asian Weightlifting Championships =

International weightlifting competition

2017 Asian Championships
- Host city: Ashgabat, Turkmenistan
- Dates: 23–29 April
- Main venue: Olympic Stadium

The 2017 Asian Weightlifting Championships were held in Ashgabat, Turkmenistan between April 23 and April 29, 2017. It was the 47th men's and 28th women's championship.

== Medal summary ==
=== Men ===
Event	Gold		Silver		Bronze	
56 kg
Snatch	Trần Lê Quốc Toàn; Vietnam	124 kg	Li Fabin; China	123 kg	Long Decheng; China	123 kg
Clean & Jerk	Long Decheng; China	150 kg	Li Fabin; China	149 kg	Trần Lê Quốc Toàn; Vietnam	147 kg
Total	Long Decheng; China	273 kg	Li Fabin; China	272 kg	Trần Lê Quốc Toàn; Vietnam	271 kg
62 kg
Snatch	Huang Minhao; China	140 kg	Sin Chol-bom; North Korea	133 kg	Trịnh Văn Vinh; Vietnam	132 kg
Clean & Jerk	Sin Chol-bom; North Korea	168 kg	Trịnh Văn Vinh; Vietnam	167 kg	Adkhamjon Ergashev; Uzbekistan	158 kg
Total	Sin Chol-bom; North Korea	301 kg	Trịnh Văn Vinh; Vietnam	299 kg	Huang Minhao; China	295 kg
69 kg
Snatch	Feng Lüdong; China	155 kg	Albert Linder; Kazakhstan	148 kg	O Kang-chol; North Korea	148 kg
Clean & Jerk	Albert Linder; Kazakhstan	187 kg	O Kang-chol; North Korea	183 kg	Doston Yokubov; Uzbekistan	177 kg
Total	Albert Linder; Kazakhstan	335 kg	O Kang-chol; North Korea	331 kg	Feng Lüdong; China	325 kg
77 kg
Snatch	Yuan Chengfei; China	160 kg	Rejepbaý Rejepow; Turkmenistan	158 kg	Kim Woo-jae; South Korea	154 kg
Clean & Jerk	Yuan Chengfei; China	195 kg	Aidar Kazov; Kazakhstan	186 kg	Kim Woo-jae; South Korea	186 kg
Total	Yuan Chengfei; China	355 kg	Rejepbaý Rejepow; Turkmenistan	343 kg	Kim Woo-jae; South Korea	340 kg
85 kg
Snatch	Saleh Cheraghi; Iran	162 kg	Zhao Yongchao; China	160 kg	Yu Dong-ju; South Korea	156 kg
Clean & Jerk	Toshiki Yamamoto; Japan	199 kg	Zhao Yongchao; China	196 kg	Yu Dong-ju; South Korea	194 kg
Total	Zhao Yongchao; China	356 kg	Saleh Cheraghi; Iran	352 kg	Toshiki Yamamoto; Japan	351 kg
94 kg
Snatch	Farkhodbek Sobirov; Uzbekistan	175 kg	Ayoub Mousavi; Iran	166 kg	Wang Ching-chieh; Chinese Taipei	145 kg
Clean & Jerk	Ayoub Mousavi; Iran	206 kg	Farkhodbek Sobirov; Uzbekistan	205 kg	Zhang Huacong; China	201 kg
Total	Farkhodbek Sobirov; Uzbekistan	380 kg	Ayoub Mousavi; Iran	372 kg	Wang Ching-chieh; Chinese Taipei	317 kg
105 kg
Snatch	Mohammad Reza Barari; Iran	177 kg	Ivan Efremov; Uzbekistan	175 kg	Ryunosuke Mochida; Japan	172 kg
Clean & Jerk	Mohammad Reza Barari; Iran	221 kg	Seo Hui-yeop; South Korea	220 kg	Ali Hashemi; Iran	213 kg
Total	Mohammad Reza Barari; Iran	398 kg	Seo Hui-yeop; South Korea	390 kg	Ali Hashemi; Iran	384 kg
+105 kg
Snatch	Hojamuhammet Toýçyýew; Turkmenistan	197 kg	Rustam Djangabaev; Uzbekistan	196 kg	Ramin Rabieifar; Iran	195 kg
Clean & Jerk	Chen Shih-chieh; Chinese Taipei	243 kg	Rustam Djangabaev; Uzbekistan	241 kg	Hojamuhammet Toýçyýew; Turkmenistan	230 kg
Total	Rustam Djangabaev; Uzbekistan	437 kg	Chen Shih-chieh; Chinese Taipei	428 kg	Hojamuhammet Toýçyýew; Turkmenistan	427 kg

=== Women ===
Event	Gold		Silver		Bronze	
48 kg
Snatch	Thunya Sukcharoen; Thailand	84 kg	Vương Thị Huyền; Vietnam	83 kg	Nguyễn Thị Thúy; Vietnam	78 kg
Clean & Jerk	Thunya Sukcharoen; Thailand	106 kg	Nguyễn Thị Thúy; Vietnam	105 kg	Ýulduz Jumabaýewa; Turkmenistan	93 kg
Total	Thunya Sukcharoen; Thailand	190 kg	Nguyễn Thị Thúy; Vietnam	183 kg	Ýulduz Jumabaýewa; Turkmenistan	165 kg
53 kg
Snatch	Wei Chengji; China	88 kg	Trần Thị Mỹ Dung; Vietnam	87 kg	Supattra Kaewkhong; Thailand	82 kg
Clean & Jerk	Wei Chengji; China	112 kg	Supattra Kaewkhong; Thailand	108 kg	Kristina Şermetowa; Turkmenistan	104 kg
Total	Wei Chengji; China	200 kg	Supattra Kaewkhong; Thailand	190 kg	Kristina Şermetowa; Turkmenistan	182 kg
58 kg
Snatch	Kuo Hsing-chun; Chinese Taipei	104 kg	Kim Su-ryon; North Korea	98 kg	Ou Lingli; China	95 kg
Clean & Jerk	Kuo Hsing-chun; Chinese Taipei	137 kg	Ou Lingli; China	124 kg	Li Ping; China	121 kg
Total	Kuo Hsing-chun; Chinese Taipei	241 kg	Ou Lingli; China	219 kg	Kim Su-ryon; North Korea	218 kg
63 kg
Snatch	Rim Un-sim; North Korea	106 kg	Siripuch Gulnoi; Thailand	102 kg	Chiang Nien-hsin; Chinese Taipei	101 kg
Clean & Jerk	Rim Un-sim; North Korea	131 kg	Chiang Nien-hsin; Chinese Taipei	130 kg	Siripuch Gulnoi; Thailand	129 kg
Total	Rim Un-sim; North Korea	237 kg	Siripuch Gulnoi; Thailand	231 kg	Chiang Nien-hsin; Chinese Taipei	231 kg
69 kg
Snatch	Shi Danhui; China	107 kg	Hung Wan-ting; Chinese Taipei	103 kg	Kim Su-hyeon; South Korea	100 kg
Clean & Jerk	Kim Su-hyeon; South Korea	130 kg	Shi Danhui; China	126 kg	Hung Wan-ting; Chinese Taipei	125 kg
Total	Shi Danhui; China	233 kg	Kim Su-hyeon; South Korea	230 kg	Hung Wan-ting; Chinese Taipei	228 kg
75 kg
Snatch	Li Rongyan; China	110 kg	Yao Chi-ling; Chinese Taipei	101 kg	Yeom Yun-jeong; South Korea	98 kg
Clean & Jerk	Li Rongyan; China	140 kg	Yao Chi-ling; Chinese Taipei	136 kg	Omadoy Otakuziyeva; Uzbekistan	120 kg
Total	Li Rongyan; China	250 kg	Yao Chi-ling; Chinese Taipei	237 kg	Yeom Yun-jeong; South Korea	217 kg
90 kg
Snatch	Shi Jiaqi; China	108 kg	Lo Ying-yuan; Chinese Taipei	95 kg	Huda Salim; Iraq	90 kg
Clean & Jerk	Shi Jiaqi; China	137 kg	Lo Ying-yuan; Chinese Taipei	136 kg	Dolera Davronova; Uzbekistan	115 kg
Total	Shi Jiaqi; China	245 kg	Lo Ying-yuan; Chinese Taipei	231 kg	Dolera Davronova; Uzbekistan	204 kg
+90 kg
Snatch	Jia Weipeng; China	129 kg	Kim Kuk-hyang; North Korea	126 kg	Chitchanok Pulsabsakul; Thailand	123 kg
Clean & Jerk	Jia Weipeng; China	170 kg	Kim Kuk-hyang; North Korea	166 kg	Chitchanok Pulsabsakul; Thailand	145 kg
Total	Jia Weipeng; China	299 kg	Kim Kuk-hyang; North Korea	292 kg	Chitchanok Pulsabsakul; Thailand	268 kg

== Medal table ==
Ranking by Big (Total result) medals

Rank	Nation	Gold	Silver	Bronze	Total
1	China	8	2	2	12
2	North Korea	2	2	1	5
3	Uzbekistan	2	0	1	3
4	Chinese Taipei	1	3	3	7
5	Iran	1	2	1	4
5	Thailand	1	2	1	4
7	Kazakhstan	1	0	0	1
8	South Korea	0	2	2	4
9	Vietnam	0	2	1	3
10	Turkmenistan	0	1	3	4
11	Japan	0	0	1	1
Totals (11 entries)		16	16	16	48

Ranking by all medals: Big (Total result) and Small (Snatch and Clean & Jerk)

Rank	Nation	Gold	Silver	Bronze	Total
1	China	22	8	6	36
2	North Korea	5	7	2	14
3	Iran	5	3	3	11
4	Chinese Taipei	4	9	6	19
5	Thailand	3	4	5	12
5	Uzbekistan	3	4	5	12
7	Kazakhstan	2	2	0	4
8	Vietnam	1	6	4	11
9	South Korea	1	3	8	12
10	Turkmenistan	1	2	6	9
11	Japan	1	0	2	3
12	Iraq	0	0	1	1
Totals (12 entries)		48	48	48	144

== Team ranking ==
=== Men ===
Rank	Team	Points
1	Iran	562
2	China	548
3	Uzbekistan	511
4	Turkmenistan	490
5	Japan	336
6	South Korea	330

=== Women ===
Rank	Team	Points
1	China	623
2	Thailand	445
3	Chinese Taipei	436
4	Turkmenistan	419
5	Kazakhstan	308
6	South Korea	265

== Participating nations ==
144 athletes from 27 nations competed.

- Afghanistan (2)
- Bangladesh (2)
- China (16)
- Chinese Taipei (9)
- Iran (8)
- Iraq (1)
- Japan (10)
- Jordan (4)
- Kazakhstan (9)
- Kuwait (6)*
- Kyrgyzstan (2)
- Lebanon (1)
- Mongolia (2)
- Nepal (1)
- North Korea (5)
- Oman (1)
- Pakistan (3)
- Saudi Arabia (3)
- South Korea (9)
- Sri Lanka (1)
- Syria (3)
- Tajikistan (2)
- Thailand (7)
- Turkmenistan (15)
- United Arab Emirates (5)
- Uzbekistan (10)
- Vietnam (7)
- Athletes from Kuwait competed as Asian Weightlifting Federation (AWF) due to the suspension of the country's Weightlifting Federation.
