= Hojamuhammet Toýçyýew =

Turkmen weightlifter (born 1992)

Hojamuhammet Toychyyev
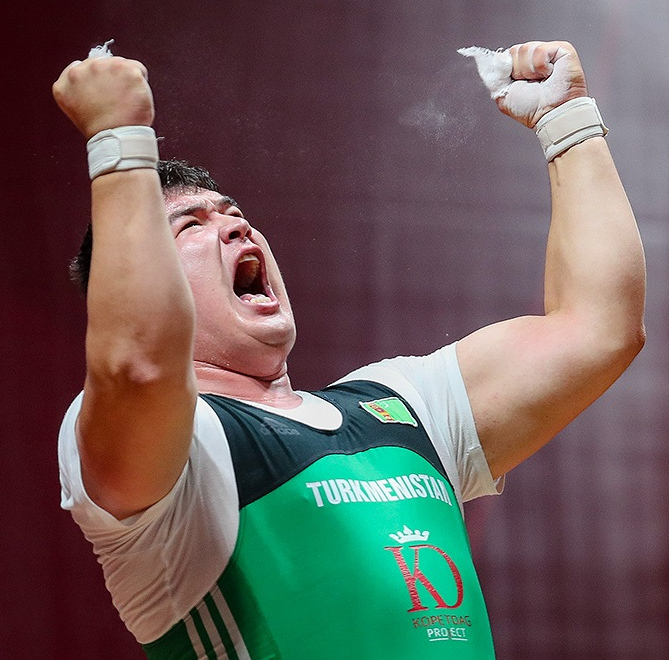
- Toýçyýew at the 2018 Asian Games

Personal information
- Nationality: Turkmen
- Born: 16 January 1992 (age 34)
- Height: 192 cm (6 ft 4 in)

Sport
- Country: Turkmenistan
- Sport: Weightlifting
- Coached by: Agamurat Janmuradov (national); Ikram Matkarimov (personal)

Achievements and titles
- Personal bests: Snatch: 197 kg (2017); Clean and jerk: 242 kg (2019); Total: 428 kg (2015)
Medal record
Representing Turkmenistan
Asian Championships
Silver medal – second place	2016 Tashkent	+105 kg
Bronze medal – third place	2017 Ashgabat	+105 kg
Bronze medal – third place	2019 Ningbo	+109 kg
Islamic Solidarity Games
Bronze medal – third place	2021 Konya	+109 kg

Hojamuhammet Akmuhammedowiç Toýçyýew (also Toychyyev or Toychiyev, born 16 January 1992) is a Turkmen weightlifter, competing in the +105 kg category. He participated in the 2016 Olympics, and placed fifth and fourth at the 2014 and 2018 Asian Games, respectively. He won two medals at the Asian championships in 2016–2017.

Toýçyýew took up weightlifting in 2005. He has a degree in coaching from the National Institute of Sports and Tourism.

== Major results ==
Year	Venue	Weight	Snatch (kg)				Clean & Jerk (kg)				Total	Rank
Year	Venue	Weight	1	2	3	Rank	1	2	3	Rank	Total	Rank
Representing Turkmenistan
Olympic Games
2016	Rio de Janeiro, Brazil	+105 kg	~~193~~	~~193~~	~~193~~	—	—	—	—	—	—	—
World Championships
2019	Pattaya, Thailand	+109 kg	180	~~187~~	~~189~~	17	235	242	—	4	422	9
2018	Ashgabat, Turkmenistan	+109 kg	~~187~~	187	~~194~~	11	235	240	~~245~~	3rd place, bronze medalist(s)	427	6
2017	Anaheim, United States	+105 kg	180	~~184~~	184	11	225	231	~~237~~	8	415	9
2015	Houston, United States	+105 kg	185	190	~~193~~	11	226	233	238	6	428	9
2011	Paris, France	+105 kg	~~170~~	170	177	19	210	218	~~223~~	13	395	14
Asian Games
2018	Jakarta, Indonesia	+105 kg	185	190	~~195~~	4	230	235	~~240~~	4	425	4
2014	Incheon, South Korea	+105 kg	~~185~~	185	189	6	220	226	~~232~~	5	415	5
Asian Championships
2022	Manama, Bahrain	+109 kg	160	168	~~174~~	7	200	205	213	4	381	4
2021	Tashkent, Uzbekistan	+109 kg	176	181	~~187~~	4	223	~~231~~	~~232~~	4	404	4
2019	Ningbo, China	+109 kg	180	187	~~191~~	4	225	231	234	3rd place, bronze medalist(s)	421	3rd place, bronze medalist(s)
2017	Ashgabat, Turkmenistan	+105 kg	185	191	197	1st place, gold medalist(s)	230	~~236~~	~~241~~	3rd place, bronze medalist(s)	427	3rd place, bronze medalist(s)
2016	Tashkent, Uzbekistan	+105 kg	175	185	190	3rd place, bronze medalist(s)	220	230	237	3rd place, bronze medalist(s)	427	2nd place, silver medalist(s)
Universiade
2013	Kazan, Russia	+105 kg	175	182	~~187~~	6	218	225	~~230~~	5	407	5
