= 2017 World Weightlifting Championships – Men's +105 kg =

The Men's +105 kg competition at the 2017 World Weightlifting Championships was held on 5 December 2017.

== Schedule ==
Date	Time	Event
5 December 2017	10:55	Group B
5 December 2017	17:25	Group A

== Medalists ==
Event	Gold		Silver		Bronze	
Snatch	Lasha Talakhadze (GEO)	220 kg	Behdad Salimi (IRI)	211 kg	Saeid Alihosseini (IRI)	203 kg
Clean & Jerk	Lasha Talakhadze (GEO)	257 kg	Mart Seim (EST)	253 kg	Saeid Alihosseini (IRI)	251 kg
Total	Lasha Talakhadze (GEO)	477 kg	Saeid Alihosseini (IRI)	454 kg	Behdad Salimi (IRI)	453 kg

== Records ==
Prior to this competition, the existing world records were as follows.

World Record	Snatch	Lasha Talakhadze (GEO)	217 kg	Split, Croatia	8 April 2017
World Record	Clean & Jerk	Hossein Rezazadeh (IRI)	263 kg	Athens, Greece	25 August 2004
World Record	Total	Lasha Talakhadze (GEO)	473 kg	Rio de Janeiro, Brazil	16 August 2016

== Results ==
Rank	Athlete	Group	Snatch (kg)				Clean & Jerk (kg)				Total
Rank	Athlete	Group	1	2	3	Rank	1	2	3	Rank	Total
1st place, gold medalist(s)	Lasha Talakhadze (GEO)	A	210	215	220	1st place, gold medalist(s)	243	250	257	1st place, gold medalist(s)	477
2nd place, silver medalist(s)	Saeid Alihosseini (IRI)	A	~~203~~	~~203~~	203	3rd place, bronze medalist(s)	236	243	251	3rd place, bronze medalist(s)	454
3rd place, bronze medalist(s)	Behdad Salimi (IRI)	A	205	211	~~216~~	2nd place, silver medalist(s)	~~241~~	242	~~252~~	5	453
4	Rustam Djangabaev (UZB)	A	195	200	~~204~~	5	240	247	~~252~~	4	447
5	Mart Seim (EST)	A	185	191	~~195~~	7	245	~~251~~	253	2nd place, silver medalist(s)	444
6	Fernando Reis (BRA)	A	192	200	~~204~~	4	240	~~247~~	~~248~~	6	440
7	Jiří Orság (CZE)	A	~~185~~	185	~~190~~	10	237	~~244~~	~~246~~	7	422
8	Walid Bidani (ALG)	A	185	191	195	6	~~215~~	217	225	10	420
9	Hojamuhammet Toýçyýew (TKM)	A	180	~~184~~	184	11	225	231	~~237~~	8	415
10	Péter Nagy (HUN)	A	183	188	~~192~~	9	219	226	~~233~~	9	414
11	Alexej Prochorow (GER)	B	180	185	190	8	207	216	~~225~~	13	406
12	Kamil Kučera (CZE)	B	~~175~~	175	~~180~~	12	220	~~226~~	~~226~~	12	395
13	Gurdeep Singh (IND)	B	165	172	~~175~~	13	207	212	216	14	388
14	David Liti (NZL)	B	160	166	~~171~~	14	218	~~222~~	222	11	388
15	Tamaš Kajdoči (SRB)	B	165	~~170~~	~~170~~	16	~~210~~	210	215	15	380
16	Anthony Coullet (FRA)	B	151	156	161	18	204	209	~~214~~	16	370
17	Igor Olshanetskyi (ISR)	B	161	~~167~~	~~170~~	17	204	~~209~~	—	17	365
18	David Litvinov (ISR)	B	160	166	~~172~~	15	~~190~~	190	~~203~~	18	356
19	Deivydas Jucius (LTU)	B	151	~~156~~	~~160~~	19	180	185	190	19	341
—	Teemu Roininen (FIN)	B	151	~~156~~	~~156~~	20	~~195~~	~~196~~	~~196~~	—	—

== New records ==
Snatch	220 kg	Lasha Talakhadze (GEO)	WR
Total	477 kg	Lasha Talakhadze (GEO)	WR
