= Weightlifting at the 2010 Asian Games =

- Venue: Dongguan Arena
- Dates: 13–19 November 2010
- Competitors: 176 from 31 nations

Weightlifting at the 2010 Asian Games was held in Guangzhou, China from November 13 to 19, 2010. There are seven weight categories for the women and eight for the men. All competition took place at the Dongguan Arena.

== Schedule ==
B	Group B	A	Group A

Event↓/Date →	13th Sat		14th Sun		15th Mon		16th Tue		17th Wed		18th Thu		19th Fri	
Men's 56 kg	B	A												
Men's 62 kg			B	A										
Men's 69 kg					B	A								
Men's 77 kg							B	A						
Men's 85 kg									B	A				
Men's 94 kg											B	A		
Men's 105 kg													B	A
Men's +105 kg													B	A
Women's 48 kg	B	A												
Women's 53 kg			B	A										
Women's 58 kg					B	A								
Women's 63 kg							A							
Women's 69 kg									A					
Women's 75 kg											A			
Women's +75 kg													A	

== Medalists ==
=== Men ===
Event	Gold	Silver	Bronze
56 kg	Wu Jingbiao; China	Cha Kum-chol; North Korea	Jadi Setiadi; Indonesia
62 kg	Zhang Jie; China	Kim Un-guk; North Korea	Eko Yuli Irawan; Indonesia
69 kg	Kim Kum-sok; North Korea	Morteza Rezaeian; Iran	Triyatno; Indonesia
77 kg	Pang Kum-chol; North Korea	Kirill Pavlov; Kazakhstan	Dauren Shauyeteyev; Kazakhstan
85 kg	Lu Yong; China	Mansurbek Chashemov; Uzbekistan	Kim Kwang-hoon; South Korea
94 kg	Ilya Ilyin; Kazakhstan	Asghar Ebrahimi; Iran	Kim Min-jae; South Korea
105 kg	Yang Zhe; China	Ivan Efremov; Uzbekistan	Sergey Istomin; Kazakhstan
+105 kg	Behdad Salimi; Iran	Jeon Sang-guen; South Korea	Sajjad Anoushiravani; Iran

=== Women ===
Event	Gold	Silver	Bronze
48 kg	Wang Mingjuan; China	Pensiri Laosirikul; Thailand	Chen Wei-ling; Chinese Taipei
53 kg	Li Ping; China	Zulfiya Chinshanlo; Kazakhstan	Prapawadee Jaroenrattanatarakoon; Thailand
58 kg	Li Xueying; China	Pak Hyon-suk; North Korea	Jong Chun-mi; North Korea
63 kg	Maiya Maneza; Kazakhstan	Kim Soo-kyung; South Korea	Chen Aichan; China
69 kg	Liu Chunhong; China	Sinta Darmariani; Indonesia	Wang Ya-jhen; Chinese Taipei
75 kg	Svetlana Podobedova; Kazakhstan	Cao Lei; China	Tatyana Khromova; Kazakhstan
+75 kg	Jang Mi-ran; South Korea	Meng Suping; China	Mariya Grabovetskaya; Kazakhstan

== Medal table ==
Rank	Nation	Gold	Silver	Bronze	Total
1	China (CHN)	8	2	1	11
2	Kazakhstan (KAZ)	3	2	4	9
3	North Korea (PRK)	2	3	1	6
4	South Korea (KOR)	1	2	2	5
5	Iran (IRI)	1	2	1	4
6	Uzbekistan (UZB)	0	2	0	2
7	Indonesia (INA)	0	1	3	4
8	Thailand (THA)	0	1	1	2
9	Chinese Taipei (TPE)	0	0	2	2
Totals (9 entries)		15	15	15	45

== Participating nations ==
A total of 176 athletes from 31 nations competed in weightlifting at the 2010 Asian Games:

- Afghanistan (1)
- Athletes from Kuwait (5)
- Bangladesh (4)
- China (14)
- Chinese Taipei (10)
- Hong Kong (1)
- India (12)
- Indonesia (7)
- Iran (8)
- Japan (6)
- Kazakhstan (15)
- Kyrgyzstan (3)
- Macau (1)
- Mongolia (3)
- Myanmar (3)
- Nepal (1)
- North Korea (9)
- Pakistan (2)
- Palestine (2)
- Philippines (2)
- Qatar (2)
- Saudi Arabia (4)
- South Korea (14)
- Sri Lanka (2)
- Syria (5)
- Tajikistan (2)
- Thailand (15)
- Timor-Leste (2)
- Turkmenistan (8)
- Uzbekistan (7)
- Vietnam (6)
