= Weightlifting at the 2014 Asian Games – Men's +105 kg =

Men's +105 kg at the 2014 Asian Games
- Venue: Moonlight Festival Garden Venue
- Date: 26 September 2014
- Competitors: 16 from 13 nations

Medalists
gold medal	Behdad Salimi	Iran
silver medal	Ai Yunan	China
bronze medal	Chen Shih-chieh	Chinese Taipei

The men's +105 kilograms event at the 2014 Asian Games took place on 26 September 2014 at Moonlight Festival Garden Weightlifting Venue.

== Schedule ==
All times are Korea Standard Time (UTC+09:00)

Date	Time	Event
Friday, 26 September 2014	11:00	Group B
Friday, 26 September 2014	19:00	Group A

== Records ==
Prior to this competition, the existing world, Asian and Games records were as follows.

World Record	Snatch	Behdad Salimi (IRI)	214 kg	Paris, France	13 November 2011
World Record	Clean & Jerk	Hossein Rezazadeh (IRI)	263 kg	Athens, Greece	25 August 2004
World Record	Total	Hossein Rezazadeh (IRI)	472 kg	Sydney, Australia	26 September 2000
Asian Record	Snatch	Behdad Salimi (IRI)	214 kg	Paris, France	13 November 2011
Asian Record	Clean & Jerk	Hossein Rezazadeh (IRI)	263 kg	Athens, Greece	25 August 2004
Asian Record	Total	Hossein Rezazadeh (IRI)	472 kg	Sydney, Australia	26 September 2000
Games Record	Snatch	Behdad Salimi (IRI)	205 kg	Guangzhou, China	19 November 2010
Games Record	Clean & Jerk	Hossein Rezazadeh (IRI)	240 kg	Busan, South Korea	10 October 2002
Games Record	Total	Hossein Rezazadeh (IRI)	440 kg	Busan, South Korea	10 October 2002

== Results ==
Legend

- NM — No mark

Rank	Athlete	Group	Body weight	Snatch (kg)				Clean & Jerk (kg)				Total
Rank	Athlete	Group	Body weight	1	2	3	Result	1	2	3	Result	Total
1st place, gold medalist(s)	Behdad Salimi (IRI)	A	170.87	200	210	~~215~~	210	241	255	—	255	465
2nd place, silver medalist(s)	Ai Yunan (CHN)	A	149.88	190	~~195~~	~~195~~	190	233	235	~~245~~	235	425
3rd place, bronze medalist(s)	Chen Shih-chieh (TPE)	A	147.90	180	187	191	191	230	~~233~~	233	233	424
4	Ibragim Bersanov (KAZ)	A	117.19	187	192	~~197~~	192	218	225	230	230	422
5	Hojamuhammet Toýçyýew (TKM)	A	132.56	~~185~~	185	189	189	220	226	~~232~~	226	415
6	Ivan Efremov (UZB)	A	113.20	182	187	192	192	217	222	~~230~~	222	414
7	Ham Sang-il (KOR)	A	127.50	170	~~177~~	~~177~~	170	~~220~~	~~220~~	220	220	390
8	Chao Shih-chieh (TPE)	B	139.55	~~165~~	~~165~~	167	167	~~205~~	205	~~208~~	205	372
9	Mohammad Ali (SYR)	B	117.20	155	~~163~~	~~163~~	155	200	~~212~~	~~212~~	200	355
10	Kosuke Chinen (JPN)	B	145.60	155	162	~~165~~	162	188	191	~~194~~	191	353
11	Ammar Naji (YEM)	B	120.10	140	~~150~~	~~151~~	140	~~175~~	175	~~181~~	175	315
12	Gopal Bahadur Shrestha (NEP)	B	106.68	107	114	~~118~~	114	150	~~157~~	~~157~~	150	264
13	Abdulraouf Noori (AFG)	B	115.07	100	108	~~115~~	108	130	~~138~~	138	138	246
—	Bahador Molaei (IRI)	A	138.39	170	177	~~183~~	177	—	—	—	—	NM
—	Kazuomi Ota (JPN)	A	144.72	175	~~180~~	~~182~~	175	~~217~~	~~217~~	~~218~~	—	NM
DQ	Mohammed Jasim (IRQ)	B	120.65	163	168	170	170	210	~~217~~	221	221	~~391~~

- Mohammed Jasim of Iraq originally finished 7th, but was disqualified after he tested positive for Etiocholanolone.

== New records ==
The following records were established during the competition.

Snatch	210	Behdad Salimi (IRI)	GR
Clean & Jerk	241	Behdad Salimi (IRI)	GR
Clean & Jerk	255	Behdad Salimi (IRI)	GR
Total	451	Behdad Salimi (IRI)	GR
Total	465	Behdad Salimi (IRI)	GR
