= Weightlifting at the 2016 Summer Olympics – Men's +105 kg =

Men's +105 kg at the Games of the XXXI Olympiad
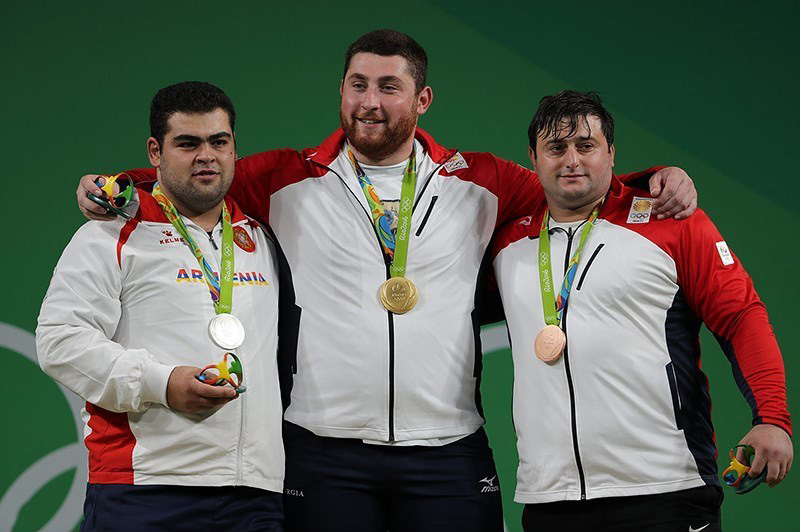
- The medalists
- Venue: Riocentro
- Date: 16 August 2016
- Competitors: 23 from 19 nations
- Winning total: 473 kg WR

Medalists
1st place, gold medalist(s)		Lasha Talakhadze	Georgia
2nd place, silver medalist(s)		Gor Minasyan	Armenia
3rd place, bronze medalist(s)		Irakli Turmanidze	Georgia

The Men's +105 kg weightlifting competitions at the 2016 Summer Olympics in Rio de Janeiro took place on 16 August at the Pavilion 2 of Riocentro.

== Schedule ==
All times are Time in Brazil (UTC-03:00)

Date	Time	Event
16 August 2016	15:30	Group B
16 August 2016	19:00	Group A

== Records ==
Prior to this competition, the existing world and Olympic records were as follows.

World record	Snatch	Behdad Salimi (IRI)	214 kg	Paris, France	13 November 2011
World record	Clean & Jerk	Hossein Rezazadeh (IRI)	263 kg	Athens, Greece	25 August 2004
World record	Total	Hossein Rezazadeh (IRI)	472 kg	Sydney, Australia	26 September 2000
Olympic record	Snatch	Hossein Rezazadeh (IRI)	212 kg	Sydney, Australia	26 September 2000
Olympic record	Clean & Jerk	Hossein Rezazadeh (IRI)	263 kg	Athens, Greece	25 August 2004
Olympic record	Total	Hossein Rezazadeh (IRI)	472 kg	Sydney, Australia	26 September 2000

== Results ==
Rank	Athlete	Group	Body weight	Snatch (kg)				Clean & Jerk (kg)				Total
Rank	Athlete	Group	Body weight	1	2	3	Result	1	2	3	Result	Total
1st place, gold medalist(s)	Lasha Talakhadze (GEO)	A	157.34	205	210	215	215	242	247	258	258	473 WR OR
2nd place, silver medalist(s)	Gor Minasyan (ARM)	A	143.67	200	207	210	210	236	~~241~~	241	241	451
3rd place, bronze medalist(s)	Irakli Turmanidze (GEO)	A	135.58	197	203	207	207	228	235	241	241	448
4	Ruben Aleksanyan (ARM)	A	151.64	186	193	195	195	245	~~254~~	~~254~~	245	440
5	Fernando Reis (BRA)	A	154.58	190	~~195~~	195	195	240	~~245~~	~~247~~	240	435 AMR
6	Rustam Djangabaev (UZB)	B	145.88	185	190	195	195	230	~~237~~	237	237	432
7	Mart Seim (EST)	A	149.10	~~187~~	187	~~191~~	187	243	~~250~~	~~255~~	243	430
8	Jiří Orság (CZE)	A	127.27	185	~~190~~	~~191~~	185	230	240	~~243~~	240	425
9	Almir Velagić (GER)	A	149.17	188	~~192~~	~~192~~	188	232	~~240~~	~~242~~	232	420
10	Péter Nagy (HUN)	B	158.86	182	188	193	193	218	227	~~234~~	227	420
11	Sardorbek Dustmurotov (UZB)	B	109.79	170	175	179	179	225	232	~~240~~	232	411
12	Aliksei Mzhachyk (BLR)	B	135.60	180	~~187~~	187	187	215	220	224	224	411
13	Walid Bidani (ALG)	B	123.46	180	185	190	190	~~210~~	211	220	220	410
14	Fernando Salas (ECU)	B	162.50	171	181	184	184	211	221	—	221	405
15	Man Asaad (SYR)	B	143.42	180	~~187~~	~~187~~	180	220	~~233~~	~~233~~	220	400
16	Alexej Prochorow (GER)	B	138.31	180	~~185~~	~~185~~	180	207	215	~~220~~	215	395
17	Igor Olshanetskyi (ISR)	B	129.54	160	165	~~170~~	165	200	~~206~~	207	207	372
18	Ondrej Kružel (SVK)	B	118.64	160	165	~~170~~	165	~~200~~	200	206	206	371
19	Ihor Shymechko (UKR)	B	129.75	170	~~175~~	~~175~~	170	190	195	~~200~~	195	365
—	Behdad Salimi (IRI)	A	169.79	206	211	216	216 WR	~~245~~	~~245~~	~~245~~	—	—
—	Chen Shih-chieh (TPE)	B	151.66	185	~~193~~	~~193~~	185	~~235~~	~~235~~	~~235~~	—	—
—	Ahmed Mohamed (EGY)	A	143.88	185	190	~~192~~	190	—	—	—	—	—
—	Hojamuhammet Toychiyev (TKM)	A	144.71	~~193~~	~~193~~	~~193~~	—	—	—	—	—	—

== New records ==
Snatch	215 kg	Lasha Talakhadze (GEO)	WR, OR
Snatch	216 kg	Behdad Salimi (IRI)	WR, OR
Total	473 kg	Lasha Talakhadze (GEO)	WR, OR
