= 2017 World Weightlifting Championships – Men's 94 kg =

The Men's 94 kg competition at the 2017 World Weightlifting Championships was held on 3 December 2017.

== Schedule ==
Date	Time	Event
3 December 2017	08:55	Group B
3 December 2017	15:25	Group A

== Medalists ==
Event	Gold		Silver		Bronze	
Snatch	Sohrab Moradi (IRI)	184 kg	Farkhodbek Sobirov (UZB)	183 kg	Ragab Abdelhay (EGY)	172 kg
Clean & Jerk	Sohrab Moradi (IRI)	233 kg	Fares El-Bakh (QAT)	220 kg	Ayoub Mousavi (IRI)	214 kg
Total	Sohrab Moradi (IRI)	417 kg	Ayoub Mousavi (IRI)	385 kg	Fares El-Bakh (QAT)	383 kg

== Records ==
Prior to this competition, the existing world records were as follows.

World Record	Snatch	Akakios Kakiasvilis (GRE)	188 kg	Athens, Greece	27 November 1999
World Record	Clean & Jerk	Szymon Kołecki (POL)	232 kg	Sofia, Bulgaria	29 April 2000
World Record	Total	Sohrab Moradi (IRI)	413 kg	Ashgabat, Turkmenistan	23 September 2017

== Results ==
Rank	Athlete	Group	Snatch (kg)				Clean & Jerk (kg)				Total
Rank	Athlete	Group	1	2	3	Rank	1	2	3	Rank	Total
1st place, gold medalist(s)	Sohrab Moradi (IRI)	A	176	182	184	1st place, gold medalist(s)	220	233	—	1st place, gold medalist(s)	417
2nd place, silver medalist(s)	Ayoub Mousavi (IRI)	A	~~166~~	166	171	4	208	214	~~218~~	3rd place, bronze medalist(s)	385
3rd place, bronze medalist(s)	Fares El-Bakh (QAT)	A	163	~~167~~	~~167~~	10	210	215	220	2nd place, silver medalist(s)	383
4	Ragab Abdelhay (EGY)	A	165	170	172	3rd place, bronze medalist(s)	~~205~~	206	~~209~~	4	378
5	Boady Santavy (CAN)	B	~~157~~	160	165	7	195	201	~~206~~	6	366
6	Marco Gregório (BRA)	A	165	~~170~~	~~170~~	6	195	~~201~~	~~201~~	9	360
7	Nathan Damron (USA)	B	152	~~157~~	157	13	192	~~200~~	201	7	358
8	Georgi Shikov (BUL)	A	164	~~167~~	~~167~~	8	~~191~~	191	~~197~~	13	355
9	Artur Mugurdumov (ISR)	B	155	158	~~160~~	12	~~190~~	190	195	11	353
10	Andrés Serna (COL)	B	~~155~~	155	160	11	~~192~~	192	~~202~~	12	352
11	Vikas Thakur (IND)	B	150	155	~~157~~	15	192	~~196~~	196	8	351
12	Manuel Sánchez (ESP)	B	150	155	~~160~~	14	190	195	~~198~~	10	350
13	Chen Po-jen (TPE)	B	160	~~165~~	166	5	~~180~~	180	~~189~~	19	346
14	Rigoberto Pérez (MEX)	B	146	~~150~~	~~151~~	20	184	~~189~~	191	14	337
15	Eero Retulainen (FIN)	B	147	~~151~~	~~152~~	18	183	189	~~192~~	15	336
16	Edmon Avetisyan (GBR)	B	145	149	151	16	~~178~~	180	~~188~~	18	331
17	Leonard Cobzariu (ROU)	B	~~150~~	150	~~157~~	17	180	~~185~~	~~186~~	17	330
18	Forrester Osei (GHA)	B	143	147	~~150~~	19	177	~~182~~	182	16	329
—	Farkhodbek Sobirov (UZB)	A	175	177	183	2nd place, silver medalist(s)	~~203~~	~~203~~	~~205~~	—	—
—	Colin Burns (USA)	A	163	~~168~~	—	9	—	—	—	—	—
—	Jürgen Spieß (GER)	A	~~163~~	~~163~~	~~163~~	—	—	—	—	—	—
—	Jung Hyeon-seop (KOR)	A	~~165~~	~~165~~	~~165~~	—	202	~~209~~	~~210~~	5	—
DQ	Aurimas Didžbalis (LTU)	A	~~172~~	~~172~~	176	—	208	~~212~~	212	—	—

== New records ==
Clean & Jerk	233 kg	Sohrab Moradi (IRI)	WR
Total	417 kg	Sohrab Moradi (IRI)	WR
