= Weightlifting at the 2018 Asian Games – Men's +105 kg =

Men's +105 kg at the 2018 Asian Games
- Venue: Jakarta International Expo
- Date: 27 August 2018
- Competitors: 7 from 6 nations

Medalists
gold medal	Behdad Salimi	Iran
silver medal	Saeid Alihosseini	Iran
bronze medal	Rustam Djangabaev	Uzbekistan

The men's +105 kilograms event at the 2018 Asian Games took place on 27 August 2018 at the Jakarta International Expo Hall A.

== Schedule ==
All times are Western Indonesia Time (UTC+07:00)

Date	Time	Event
Monday, 27 August 2018	14:00	Group A

== Records ==
Prior to this competition, the existing world, Asian and Games records were as follows.

World Record	Snatch	Lasha Talakhadze (GEO)	220 kg	Anaheim, United States	5 December 2017
World Record	Clean & Jerk	Hossein Rezazadeh (IRI)	263 kg	Athens, Greece	25 August 2004
World Record	Total	Lasha Talakhadze (GEO)	477 kg	Anaheim, United States	5 December 2017
Asian Record	Snatch	Behdad Salimi (IRI)	216 kg	Rio de Janeiro, Brazil	16 August 2016
Asian Record	Clean & Jerk	Hossein Rezazadeh (IRI)	263 kg	Athens, Greece	25 August 2004
Asian Record	Total	Hossein Rezazadeh (IRI)	472 kg	Sydney, Australia	26 September 2000
Games Record	Snatch	Behdad Salimi (IRI)	210 kg	Incheon, South Korea	26 September 2014
Games Record	Clean & Jerk	Behdad Salimi (IRI)	255 kg	Incheon, South Korea	26 September 2014
Games Record	Total	Behdad Salimi (IRI)	465 kg	Incheon, South Korea	26 September 2014

== Results ==
Legend

- NM — No mark

Rank	Athlete	Group	Snatch (kg)				Clean & Jerk (kg)				Total
Rank	Athlete	Group	1	2	3	Result	1	2	3	Result	Total
1st place, gold medalist(s)	Behdad Salimi (IRI)	A	200	~~206~~	208	208	237	246	253	253	461
2nd place, silver medalist(s)	Saeid Alihosseini (IRI)	A	~~201~~	201	208	208	240	248	~~254~~	248	456
3rd place, bronze medalist(s)	Rustam Djangabaev (UZB)	A	195	200	203	203	240	~~248~~	252	252	455
4	Hojamuhammet Toýçyýew (TKM)	A	185	190	~~195~~	190	230	235	~~240~~	235	425
5	Nooh Dastgir Butt (PAK)	A	~~170~~	170	~~175~~	170	220	230	235	235	405
—	Man Asaad (SYR)	A	180	~~185~~	187	187	~~225~~	~~225~~	~~225~~	—	NM
—	Chen Shih-chieh (TPE)	A	185	~~193~~	~~193~~	185	~~230~~	~~230~~	~~230~~	—	NM
