= Rustam Djangabaev =

Uzbekistani weightlifter (born 1993)

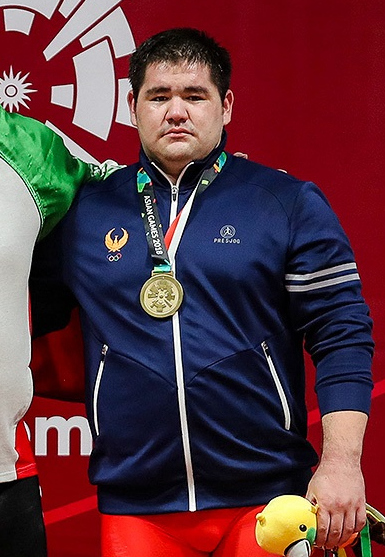
- Djangabaev at the 2018 Asian Games

Personal information
- Nationality: Uzbekistani
- Born: 25 August 1993 (age 33)
- Height: 180 cm (5 ft 11 in)
- Weight: 149.49 kg (330 lb)

Sport
- Country: Uzbekistan
- Sport: Weightlifting
- Event: +109 kg
- Coached by: Mansurbek Chashemov; Bakhrom Abdumalikov
Medal record
Men's weightlifting
Representing Uzbekistan
World Championships
Disqualified	2018 Ashgabat	+109 kg
Asian Games
Bronze medal – third place	2018 Jakarta	+105 kg
Asian Championships
Gold medal – first place	2017 Ashgabat	+105 kg
Islamic Solidarity Games
Gold medal – first place	2017 Baku	+105 kg

Rustam Djangabaev (born 25 August 1993) is an Uzbekistani heavyweight weightlifter. He won a gold medal at the 2017 Asian Championships and a bronze at the 2018 Asian Games. He placed sixth at the 2016 Olympics.

Djangabaev took up weightlifting in 2011. He has a degree in physical education from the Nukus State Pedagogical Institute.

In 2019 he tested positive for Growth Hormone and was banned until 2023 by the International Weightlifting Federation.

== Major results ==
Year	Venue	Weight	Snatch (kg)				Clean & Jerk (kg)				Total	Rank
Year	Venue	Weight	1	2	3	Rank	1	2	3	Rank	Total	Rank
Representing Uzbekistan
Olympic Games
2016	Rio de Janeiro, Brazil	+105 kg	185	190	195	5	230	~~237~~	237	8	432	6
World Championships
2015	Houston, United States	+105 kg	165	170	174	21	205	210	215	22	389	20
2017	Anaheim, United States	+105 kg	195	200	~~205~~	5	240	247	~~252~~	4	447	4
2018	Ashgabat, Turkmenistan	+109 kg	195	~~202~~	202	4	236	~~244~~	245	DQ	447	DQ
Asian Games
2018	Jakarta, Indonesia	+105 kg	195	200	203	3	240	~~248~~	252	2	455	3rd place, bronze medalist(s)
