= Lasha Talakhadze =

Georgian weightlifter (born 1993)

Lasha Talakhadze OLY
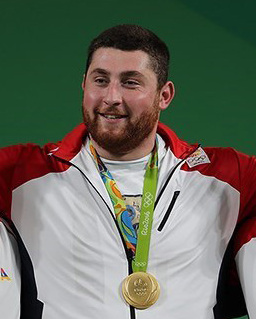
- Talakhadze at the 2016 Summer Olympics

Personal information
- Native name: ლაშა ტალახაძე
- Born: 2 October 1993 (age 33) Sachkhere, Georgia
- Home town: Tbilisi, Georgia
- Height: 1.97 m (6 ft 6 in)
- Weight: 183 kg (403 lb)

Sport
- Country: Georgia
- Sport: Weightlifting
- Event: +109 kg
- Coached by: Giorgi Asanidze

Achievements and titles
- Personal bests: Snatch: 225 kg (2021, CWR^{[a]}); Clean and jerk: 267 kg (2021, CWR); Total: 492 kg (2021, CWR)
Medal record
Men's weightlifting
Representing Georgia
Olympic Games
Gold medal – first place	2016 Rio de Janeiro	+105 kg
Gold medal – first place	2020 Tokyo	+109 kg
Gold medal – first place	2024 Paris	+102 kg
World Championships
Gold medal – first place	2015 Houston	+105 kg
Gold medal – first place	2017 Anaheim	+105 kg
Gold medal – first place	2018 Ashgabat	+109 kg
Gold medal – first place	2019 Pattaya	+109 kg
Gold medal – first place	2021 Tashkent	+109 kg
Gold medal – first place	2022 Bogotá	+109 kg
Gold medal – first place	2023 Riyadh	+109 kg
European Championships
Gold medal – first place	2016 Førde	+105 kg
Gold medal – first place	2017 Split	+105 kg
Gold medal – first place	2018 Bucharest	+105 kg
Gold medal – first place	2019 Batumi	+109 kg
Gold medal – first place	2021 Moscow	+109 kg
Gold medal – first place	2022 Tirana	+109 kg
Gold medal – first place	2023 Yerevan	+109 kg

Lasha Talakhadze (Georgian: ლაშა ტალახაძე; Georgian pronunciation: [laʃa tʼalaχadze]; born 2 October 1993) is a Georgian weightlifter, holding the all-time world records independent of weight category in the snatch (225 kg, 496 lb), the clean and jerk (267 kg, 589 lb), and the total (492 kg, 1,085 lb) since 2021.

Talakhadze is a three-time Olympic champion, seven-time world champion, and seven-time European champion competing in the super-heavyweight category (105 kg + until 2018 and 109 kg + starting in 2018 after the International Weightlifting Federation reorganized the categories). He is a three-time winner of the IWF Male Lifter of the Year.

Since 2024, Talakhadze is a parliamentarian for the Georgian Dream party in Georgia.

== Career ==
=== Early career and +105 kg division ===
Talakhadze represented Georgia at the 2015 World Weightlifting Championships, and originally finished second with a total of 454 kg. In December 2015, Aleksey Lovchev (the original gold medalist and world record holder in the clean & jerk and total) failed a drug test for Ipamorelin. The IWF stripped his gold medal and rescinded his world records, and as a result Talakhadze became world champion.

At the 2016 Olympics he completed a snatch of 215 kg to break the world record of 214 kg set by Behdad Salimi (who took the record back with 216 kg, equaling the all-time highest set by Antonio Krastev of Bulgaria in 1987). In the clean & jerk portion of the competition, Behdad Salimi initially completed a 245 kg lift on his second attempt, but it was overruled by the 5 member jury, and was unable to complete his third attempt of 245 kg. Lasha then completed his next lift of 247 kg, giving him the lead after Salimi did not make a lift. He then completed a clean & jerk of 258 kg to set a new world record total of 473 kg and won the gold medal by a 22 kg margin over silver medallist Gor Minasyan.

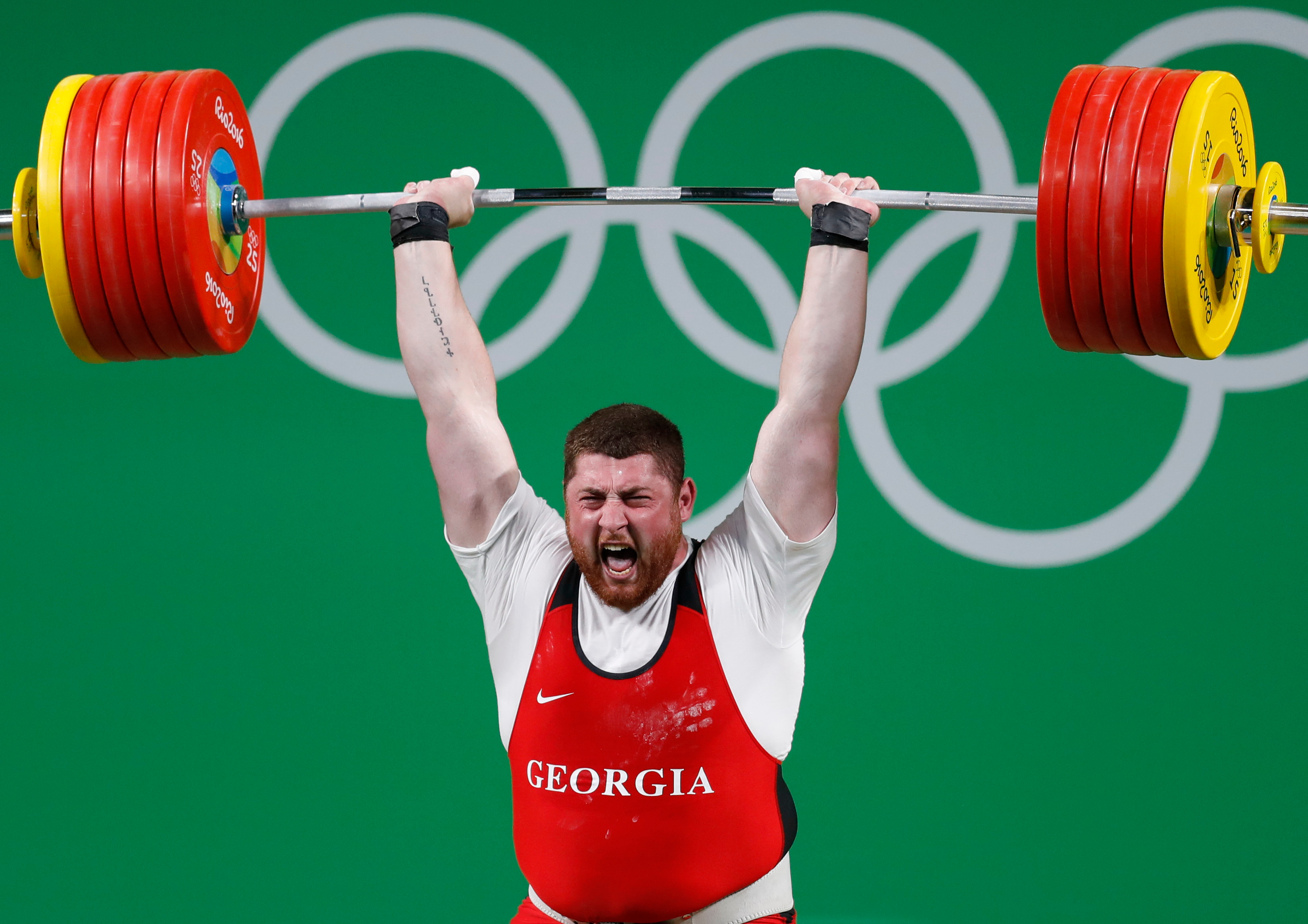
Talakhadze lifting 258 kg (clean & jerk) at the 2016 Olympics

In his first competition after winning the gold medal at the 2016 Summer Olympics, he set a new world record in the snatch at the 2017 European Weightlifting Championships with 217 kg, and in the process broke the all-time highest snatch of 216 kg set by Antonio Krastev in 1987, and matched by Behdad Salimi at the 2016 Olympics.

At the 2017 World Weightlifting Championships, Talakhadze broke his own snatch record with 220 kg, giving him a 9 kg lead over former world record holder Behdad Salimi. In the clean & jerk portion of the competition he lifted 257 kg which set a new world record for the total with 477 kg, also breaking the all-time highest total of Leonid Taranenko from 1988. In the competition he won all three gold medals, set 2 world records and had a 23 kg lead over the silver medalist Saeid Alihosseini.

=== +109 kg division ===
In 2018, the IWF restructured the weight classes and nullified the existing world records. The 2018 World Weightlifting Championships were the first international competition with new weight classes and Talakhadze competed in the +109 kg category. In the snatch portion of the competition he opened with 207 kg which placed him in the gold medal position with Gor Minasyan being the only competitor with another attempt. After Minasyan missed his third attempt, Talakhadze had the gold medal in the snatch secured. For his last two lifts, after securing the gold medal, he completed two world record lifts of 212 kg and 217 kg to put him 12 kg ahead of Minasyan after the snatch portion. In the clean & jerk portion of the competition he completed his first lift of 245 kg which set a new world record in the total, and would have won the gold medal in the total if he did not complete any more lifts. After Mart Seim failed to make a 251 kg clean & jerk, Talakhadze completed a world record lift of 252 kg for his second lift. He finished the competition with another world record lift of 257 kg, and finished with a 474 kg total, a full 24 kg over silver medalist Minasyan.

In 2019, he competed in the 2019 European Weightlifting Championships which was held in Batumi in his home country of Georgia. Apart from being the heavy favorite to win the +109 kg category, there were expectations that Talakhadze would increase upon his current world records. In the snatch portion of the competition he lifted 208 kg in his first attempt (which would have been good for a gold medal), and then set a new world record with a 218 kg lift. Coming into the clean & jerk portion he led fellow Georgian weightlifter Irakli Turmanidze by 12 kg, and his first lift of 245 kg secured him the gold medal in the total. His second lift of 260 kg set a new world record in the clean & jerk and in the total. His total world record of 478 kg set during the competition was the highest total ever achieved in weightlifting, the previous highest of 477 kg was set by himself in 2017.

Fresh off of his victory at the 2019 European Weightlifting Championships, he again looked like the heavy favorite to win his fourth World Championships. During the snatch portion of the 2019 World Weightlifting Championships he completed a 215 kg lift which secured him a gold medal, his third lift of 220 kg tied his performance at the 2017 World Weightlifting Championships, where he lifted 220 kg in the old 105 kg category, as the heaviest snatch of all time. During the clean & jerk portion he secured gold medals in the total and clean & jerk with his second lift of 255 kg. His third lift of 264 kg in the clean & jerk set a new world record in the clean & jerk and total, his total of 484 kg was the highest total recorded in international competition in history.

In 2021, he won the gold medal in the men's +109 kg event at the 2021 World Weightlifting Championships held in Tashkent, Uzbekistan, breaking his own records in the snatch —225 kg—, the clean and jerk —267 kg— and in the total —492 kg.

In June 2022, at the European Weightlifting Championships, recovering from an injury in his left leg, he again took first place, becoming a six-time European champion with a score of 217–245–462.

At the 2022 World Championships in Bogotá, Colombia, in the category over 109 kg, he won the champion title in the sum of two exercises with a result of 466 kg and also had both small gold medals (in the snatch with a result of 215 kg and the clean and jerk with 251 kg).

In Yerevan, at the 2023 European Championships, in the over 109 kg category, Lasha won a gold medal by lifting a total of 474 kg. He also won gold medals in both the snatch and the clean and jerk.

In Saudi Arabia, where the 2023 World Weightlifting Championships took place, Lasha again won the world champion title — the seventh in his career with a result of 473 kg in the total. He also won gold medals in the snatch and the clean and jerk.

In February 2024, he withdrew from the European Championships in Sofia after an injury in one of his knees.

In August 2024, Talakhadze won third Olympic gold medal in weightlifting. He defended his third title in men's +102kg weightlifting at the 2024 Summer Olympics in Paris. He took the win lifting 215 kg in the Snatch and 255 kg in the Clean & Jerk for a total of 470 kg. He defeated his opponent Armenia's Varazdat Lalayan, who took silver on 467 kg.

== Member of Parliament ==
On 26 June 2026, Talakhadze was involved in a physical altercation during a brawl that erupted in the Georgian Parliament. The incident occurred during the final plenary sitting of the spring session, which was dedicated to Irakli Kobakhidze's annual government report. Footage published by media outlets clearly identified Talakhadze striking an opponent from behind, along with Archil Gorduladze, chair of the legal issues committee, also physically striking opponents during the confrontation.

== Awards and recognition ==
=== World records ===
Throughout his career he has set 26 official senior world records.

=== Other awards ===
In 2016, due to his world record setting performance at the 2016 Summer Olympics Talakhadze was awarded the President's Order of Excellence by Giorgi Margvelashvili. In 2017 and in 2018, the Georgian National Olympic Committee awarded him the title of Georgia's Sportsperson of the Year. In 2018 he was named the IWF Male Lifter of the Year for 2017. In 2019 he was named IWF Male Lifter of the Year for 2018.

== Personal life ==
=== 2013 doping ban ===
In 2013, Talakhadze was banned from competition for 2 years after testing positive for the performance enhancing drug stanozolol.

== Major results ==
Year	Venue	Weight	Snatch (kg)				Clean & Jerk (kg)				Total	Rank
Year	Venue	Weight	1	2	3	Rank	1	2	3	Rank	Total	Rank
Olympic Games
2016	Rio de Janeiro, Brazil	+105 kg	205	210	215	—N/a	242	247	258	—N/a	473 OR	1st place, gold medalist(s)
2021	Tokyo, Japan	+109 kg	208	215	223 OR	—N/a	245	255	265 OR	—N/a	488 OR	1st place, gold medalist(s)
2024	Paris, France	+102 kg	210	215	~~220~~	—N/a	247	255	—	—N/a	470	1st place, gold medalist(s)
World Championships
2010	Antalya, Turkey	+105 kg	157	~~162~~	162	27	~~180~~	~~180~~	—	—	—	—
2011	Paris, France	+105 kg	175	180	~~187~~	15	~~207~~	207	—	24	387	19
2015	Houston, United States	+105 kg	~~200~~	200	207	1st place, gold medalist(s)	238	~~247~~	247	2nd place, silver medalist(s)	454	1st place, gold medalist(s)
2017	Anaheim, United States	+105 kg	210	215	220 WR	1st place, gold medalist(s)	243	250	257	1st place, gold medalist(s)	477 WR	1st place, gold medalist(s)
2018	Ashgabat, Turkmenistan	+109 kg	207	212	217	1st place, gold medalist(s)	245	252	257	1st place, gold medalist(s)	474	1st place, gold medalist(s)
2019	Pattaya, Thailand	+109 kg	208	215	220	1st place, gold medalist(s)	247	255	264	1st place, gold medalist(s)	484	1st place, gold medalist(s)
2021	Tashkent, Uzbekistan	+109 kg	210	218	225 CWR	1st place, gold medalist(s)	247	257	267 CWR	1st place, gold medalist(s)	492 CWR	1st place, gold medalist(s)
2022	Bogotá, Colombia	+109 kg	208	215	~~220~~	1st place, gold medalist(s)	~~245~~	245	251	1st place, gold medalist(s)	466	1st place, gold medalist(s)
2023	Riyadh, Saudi Arabia	+109 kg	208	215	220	1st place, gold medalist(s)	245	253	~~260~~	1st place, gold medalist(s)	473	1st place, gold medalist(s)
European Championships
2016	Førde, Norway	+105 kg	200	207	212	1st place, gold medalist(s)	235	241	251	1st place, gold medalist(s)	463	1st place, gold medalist(s)
2017	Split, Croatia	+105 kg	203	210	217	1st place, gold medalist(s)	238	245	250	1st place, gold medalist(s)	467	1st place, gold medalist(s)
2018	Bucharest, Romania	+105 kg	200	210	~~221~~	1st place, gold medalist(s)	235	247	—	1st place, gold medalist(s)	457	1st place, gold medalist(s)
2019	Batumi, Georgia	+109 kg	208	218	—	1st place, gold medalist(s)	245	260	—	1st place, gold medalist(s)	478	1st place, gold medalist(s)
2021	Moscow, Russia	+109 kg	211	217	222	1st place, gold medalist(s)	245	253	263	1st place, gold medalist(s)	485	1st place, gold medalist(s)
2022	Tirana, Albania	+109 kg	208	212	217	1st place, gold medalist(s)	245	~~253~~	—	1st place, gold medalist(s)	462	1st place, gold medalist(s)
2023	Yerevan, Armenia	+109 kg	210	217	222	1st place, gold medalist(s)	246	252	—	1st place, gold medalist(s)	474	1st place, gold medalist(s)
World Junior Championships
2013	Lima, Peru	+105 kg	185	190	~~195~~	1st place, gold medalist(s)	217	221	—	1st place, gold medalist(s)	411	1st place, gold medalist(s)
European Junior & U23 Championships
2011	Bucharest, Romania	+105 kg	175	180	185	1st place, gold medalist(s)	205	212	217	1st place, gold medalist(s)	402	1st place, gold medalist(s)
2012	Eilat, Israel	+105 kg	175	183	190	3rd place, bronze medalist(s)	205	222	~~232~~	3rd place, bronze medalist(s)	412	3rd place, bronze medalist(s)
2013	Tallinn, Estonia	+105 kg	182	190	—	—	210	225	—	—	DSQ	—
2016	Eilat, Israel	+105 kg	193	200	205	1st place, gold medalist(s)	222	235	—	1st place, gold medalist(s)	440	1st place, gold medalist(s)
European Youth Championships
2010	Valencia, Spain	+94 kg	150	155	158	1st place, gold medalist(s)	175	182	187	1st place, gold medalist(s)	345	1st place, gold medalist(s)
IWF Tournaments
2019	Gaziantep, Turkey; International Naim Süleymanoğlu Tournament	+109 kg	193	200	208	1st place, gold medalist(s)	227	242	—	1st place, gold medalist(s)	450	1st place, gold medalist(s)
IWF World Cup
2020	Rome, Italy	+109 kg	200	210	215	1st place, gold medalist(s)	235	245	255	1st place, gold medalist(s)	470	1st place, gold medalist(s)

== Table of world records ==
Discipline	Result (kg)	Location	Competition	Date
+105 kg
Snatch	215	Rio de Janeiro, Brazil	Summer Olympics	16 August 2016
Total	473	Rio de Janeiro, Brazil	Summer Olympics	16 August 2016
Snatch	217	Split, Croatia	European Championships	8 April 2017
Snatch	220	Anaheim, United States	World Championships	5 December 2017
Total	477	Anaheim, United States	World Championships	5 December 2017
+109 kg
Snatch	212	Ashgabat, Turkmenistan	World Championships	10 November 2018
Snatch	217	Ashgabat, Turkmenistan	World Championships	10 November 2018
Total	462	Ashgabat, Turkmenistan	World Championships	10 November 2018
Clean & jerk	252	Ashgabat, Turkmenistan	World Championships	10 November 2018
Total	469	Ashgabat, Turkmenistan	World Championships	10 November 2018
Clean & jerk	257	Ashgabat, Turkmenistan	World Championships	10 November 2018
Total	474	Ashgabat, Turkmenistan	World Championships	10 November 2018
Snatch	218	(Georgia (country)) Batumi, Georgia	European Championships	13 April 2019
Clean & jerk	260	(Georgia (country)) Batumi, Georgia	European Championships	13 April 2019
Total	478	(Georgia (country)) Batumi, Georgia	European Championships	13 April 2019
Snatch	220	Pattaya, Thailand	World Championships	27 September 2019
Clean & jerk	264	Pattaya, Thailand	World Championships	27 September 2019
Total	484	Pattaya, Thailand	World Championships	27 September 2019
Snatch	222	Moscow, Russia	European Championships	11 April 2021
Total	485	Moscow, Russia	European Championships	11 April 2021
Snatch	223	Tokyo, Japan	Summer Olympics	4 August 2021
Clean & jerk	265	Tokyo, Japan	Summer Olympics	4 August 2021
Total	488	Tokyo, Japan	Summer Olympics	4 August 2021
Snatch	225	Tashkent, Uzbekistan	World Championships	17 December 2021
Clean & jerk	267	Tashkent, Uzbekistan	World Championships	17 December 2021
Total	492	Tashkent, Uzbekistan	World Championships	17 December 2021

== Notes ==
- ^{a} His 220 kg snatch was a world record until 2018 when the IWF restructured the weight classes. He has since surpassed that lift for a current personal best and world record in the +109 kg category of 225 kg set at the 2021 World Championships. His personal bests (on video in training) are 225 kg snatch and a 270 kg clean and jerk.

Olympic Games
Preceded by Avtandil Tchrikishvili	Flagbearer for Georgia (with Nino Salukvadze); Tokyo 2020, Paris 2024	Succeeded by Incumbent
