= Ayoub Mousavi =

Iranian weightlifter (born 1995)

Personal information
- Full name: Seyed Ayoub Mousavi
- Nationality: Iranian
- Born: 21 April 1995 (age 31)
- Weight: 84.20 kg (185.6 lb)

Sport
- Country: Iran
- Sport: Weightlifting
- Event: 85 kg

Achievements and titles
- Personal bests: Snatch: 171 kg (2017); Clean and jerk: 214 kg (2017); Total: 385 kg (2017)
Medal record
Men's weightlifting
Representing Iran
World Championships
Silver medal – second place	2017 Anaheim	94 kg
Asian Championships
Silver medal – second place	2016 Tashkent	85 kg
Silver medal – second place	2017 Ashgabat	94 kg
Silver medal – second place	2019 Ningbo	96 kg
Islamic Solidarity Games
Gold medal – first place	2017 Baku	94 kg

Seyed Ayoub Mousavi (Persian: سید ایوب موسوی, born 21 April 1995) is an Iranian weightlifter who won a bronze medal at the 2017 World Weightlifting Championships.

== Major results ==
Year	Venue	Weight	Snatch (kg)				Clean & Jerk (kg)				Total	Rank
Year	Venue	Weight	1	2	3	Rank	1	2	3	Rank	Total	Rank
World Championships
2017	Anaheim, United States	94 kg	~~166~~	166	171	4	208	214	~~218~~	3rd place, bronze medalist(s)	385	2nd place, silver medalist(s)
Asian Championships
2016	Tashkent, Uzbekistan	85 kg	157	158	~~163~~	5	190	198	~~200~~	2nd place, silver medalist(s)	356	2nd place, silver medalist(s)
2017	Ashgabat, Turkmenistan	94 kg	160	166	~~171~~	2nd place, silver medalist(s)	200	206	~~215~~	1st place, gold medalist(s)	372	2nd place, silver medalist(s)
2019	Ningbo, China	96 kg	166	~~171~~	~~171~~	3rd place, bronze medalist(s)	205	207	~~225~~	2nd place, silver medalist(s)	373	2nd place, silver medalist(s)
Islamic Solidarity Games
2017	Baku, Azerbaijan	94 kg	161	166	169	2	205	210	212	1	381	1st place, gold medalist(s)
Fajr cup
2016	Tehran, Iran	85 kg	160	166	~~169~~	3rd place, bronze medalist(s)	196	~~203~~	~~208~~	5	362	3rd place, bronze medalist(s)
World Junior Championships
2015	Wrocław, Poland	85 kg	147	153	~~156~~	5	188	~~195~~	~~195~~	6	341	5
