= Saeid Alihosseini =

Iranian weightlifter (born 1988)

Saeed Alihosseini
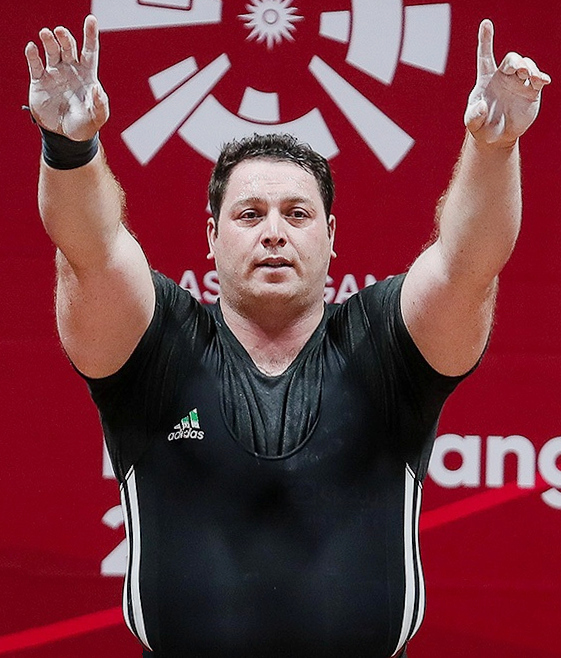
- Alihosseini at the 2018 Asian Games

Personal information
- Native name: سعید علی‌حسینی
- Nationality: Iranian
- Born: 2 February 1988 (age 38) Ardabil, Iran
- Education: Ph.D. in sports physiology University of Mohaghegh Ardabili
- Height: 190 cm (6 ft 3 in)
- Weight: 166.50 kg (367 lb)

Sport
- Country: Iran
- Sport: Weightlifting
- Event: +109 kg
- Coached by: Aziz Alihosseini

Achievements and titles
- Personal bests: Snatch: 208 kg (2018); Clean and jerk: 251 kg (2017); Total: 456 kg (2018)
Medal record
Representing Iran
World Championships
Silver medal – second place	2017 Anaheim	+105 kg
Asian Games
Silver medal – second place	2018 Jakarta	+105 kg

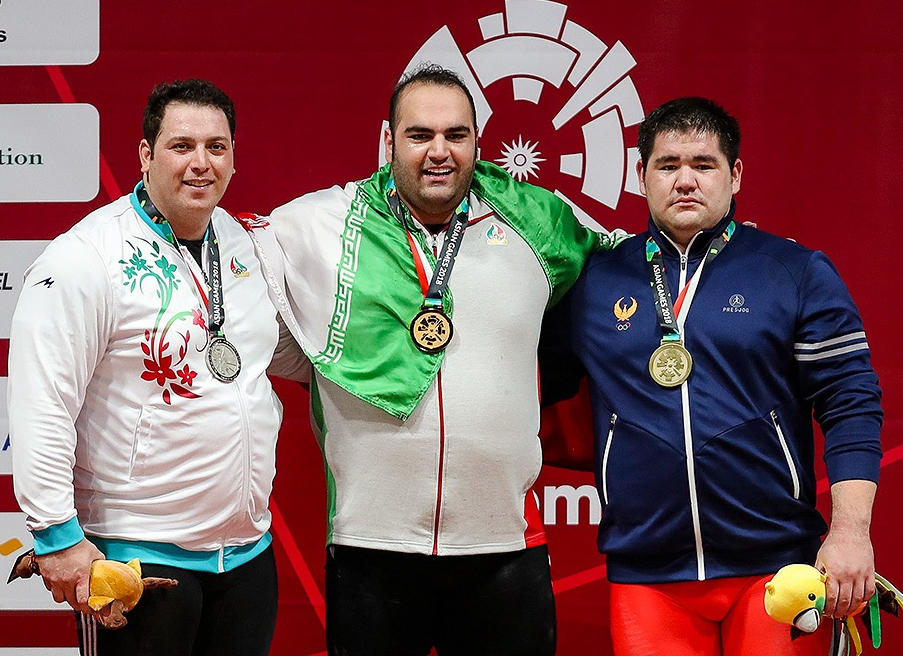
2018 Asian Games podium, Left-right: Alihosseini, Salimi, Djangabaev

Saeid Alihosseini (Persian: سعيد علی حسينی, born 2 February 1988) is a former Iranian super heavyweight weightlifter. He failed two doping tests in 2006 and October 2009; the latter was originally a lifetime ban, but was reduced upon first appeal to 12 years; in 2011, the ban was reduced to eight years.

== Weightlifting career ==
=== Doping ban ===
Saeid had failed two doping tests in 2006 and October 2009; the latter was originally a lifetime ban, but was reduced upon first appeal to 12 years. In 2011, after it was discovered that his coach (who had been banned himself) was doping his athletes without their knowledge, the ban was reduced to eight years.

=== World Championships ===
In 2017 he was eligible to return to international competition, and competed at the 2017 World Weightlifting Championships. He won bronze medals in the snatch and clean & jerk, and after his teammate Behdad Salimi had his final clean and jerk overturned by the jury Saeid won the silver medal.

In 2018 Saeid was originally going to compete at the 2018 World Weightlifting Championships, but an injury forced him to withdraw from the competition.

=== Retirement ===
In November 2019, Alihosseini announced his retirement from the sport after losing hope of competing in the 2020 Tokyo Olympic Games.

== Major results ==
Major results:

Year	Venue	Weight	Snatch (kg)				Clean & Jerk (kg)				Total	Rank
Year	Venue	Weight	1	2	3	Rank	1	2	3	Rank	Total	Rank
World Championships
2017	Anaheim, United States	+105 kg	~~203~~	~~203~~	203	3rd place, bronze medalist(s)	236	243	251	3rd place, bronze medalist(s)	454	2nd place, silver medalist(s)
Asian Games
2018	Jakarta, Indonesia	+105 kg	~~201~~	201	208	1	240	248	~~254~~	3	456	2nd place, silver medalist(s)
Asian Championships
2005	Dubai, United Arab Emirates	+105 kg	171			5	--			--	--	--
2019	Ningbo, China	+109 kg	170	~~180~~	~~189~~	9	201	220	~~233~~	6	390	8
World Junior Championships
2006	Hangzhou, China	+105 kg			181	2nd place, silver medalist(s)			215	2nd place, silver medalist(s)	396	1st place, gold medalist(s)
Asian Junior Championships
2008	Jeonju, South Korea	+105 kg			206 JWR	1st place, gold medalist(s)			245 JWR	1st place, gold medalist(s)	451 JWR	1st place, gold medalist(s)
Asian Interclub Championship
2008	Goyang, South Korea	+105 kg			200	1st place, gold medalist(s)			242	1st place, gold medalist(s)	442	1st place, gold medalist(s)
