= Sajjad Anoushiravani =

Iranian weightlifter (born 1984)

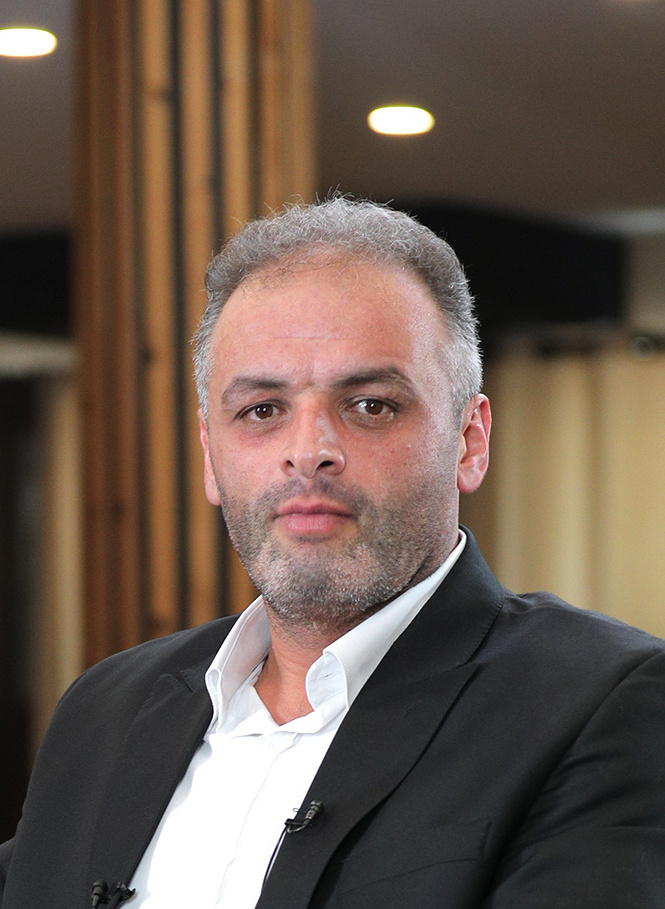
- Anoushiravani in 2024

Personal information
- Full name: Sajjad Anoushiravani Hamlabad
- Nationality: Iran
- Born: 12 May 1984 (age 42) Ardabil, Iran
- Height: 1.92 m (6 ft 4 in)
- Weight: 152 kg (335 lb)

Sport
- Country: Iran
- Sport: Weightlifting
- Event: +105 kg

Achievements and titles
- Personal bests: Snatch: 204 kg (2012); Clean and jerk: 245 kg (2012); Total: 449 kg (2012)
Medal record
Representing Iran
Men's weightlifting
Olympic Games
Silver medal – second place	2012 London	+105 kg
World Championships
Silver medal – second place	2011 Paris	+105 kg
Asian Games
Bronze medal – third place	2010 Guangzhou	+105 kg
Asian Championships
Bronze medal – third place	2012 Pyeongtaek	+105 kg

Sajjad Anoushiravani Hamlabad (Persian: سجاد انوشیروانی حمل‌آباد, born 12 May 1984 in Ardabil) is the president of Islamic Republic of Iran Weightlifting Federation since June 2022. He is an Iranian weightlifter in the +105 kg category . He was the head coach of Iran's weightlifting team at Rio Olympics in summer 2016, that won two golds. Sajjad won the silver medal at the 2012 Summer Olympics in the men's +105 kg category with a total of 449 kg.

== Major result ==
Year	Venue	Weight	Snatch (kg)				Clean & Jerk (kg)				Total	Rank
Year	Venue	Weight	1	2	3	Rank	1	2	3	Rank	Total	Rank
Olympic Games
2012	London, United Kingdom	+105 kg	198	~~204~~	204	3	237	245	~~251~~	3	449	2nd place, silver medalist(s)
World Championships
2010	Antalya, Turkey	+105 kg	~~185~~	185	191	7	~~228~~	228	235	4	426	5
2011	Paris, France	+105 kg	~~193~~	193	198	3rd place, bronze medalist(s)	228	233	241	2nd place, silver medalist(s)	439	2nd place, silver medalist(s)
Asian Games
2010	Guangzhou, China	+105 kg	185	191	195	2	226	232	~~237~~	3	427	3rd place, bronze medalist(s)
Asian Championships
2012	Pyeongtaek, South Korea	+105 kg	188	193	~~196~~	3rd place, bronze medalist(s)	223	231	238	2nd place, silver medalist(s)	431	3rd place, bronze medalist(s)
