= 2016 Asian Weightlifting Championships =

International weightlifting competition

2016 Asian Championships
- Host city: Tashkent, Uzbekistan
- Dates: 22–30 April

The 2016 Asian Weightlifting Championships was held in Tashkent, Uzbekistan from April 22–30, 2016. It was the 46th men's and 27th women's championship.

== Medal summary ==
=== Men ===
| Event | Gold | | Silver | | Bronze | |
56 kg
| Snatch | Sinphet Kruaithong; Thailand | 130 kg | Li Fabin; China | 126 kg | Meng Cheng; China | 126 kg |
| Clean & Jerk | Meng Cheng; China | 159 kg | Sinphet Kruaithong; Thailand | 154 kg | Nestor Colonia; Philippines | 148 kg |
| Total | Meng Cheng; China | 285 kg | Sinphet Kruaithong; Thailand | 284 kg | Li Fabin; China | 273 kg |
62 kg
| Snatch | Yoichi Itokazu; Japan | 130 kg | Mohammed Ridha; Iraq | 125 kg | Adkhamjon Ergashev; Uzbekistan | 125 kg |
| Clean & Jerk | Trịnh Văn Vinh; Vietnam | 158 kg | Yoichi Itokazu; Japan | 158 kg | Mohammed Ridha; Iraq | 152 kg |
| Total | Yoichi Itokazu; Japan | 288 kg | Trịnh Văn Vinh; Vietnam | 282 kg | Mohammed Ridha; Iraq | 277 kg |
69 kg
| Snatch | Izzat Artykov; Kyrgyzstan | 150 kg | Yuan Chengfei; China | 150 kg | Deni; Indonesia | 142 kg |
| Clean & Jerk | Izzat Artykov; Kyrgyzstan | 188 kg | Yuan Chengfei; China | 185 kg | Kwon Yong-gwang; North Korea | 181 kg |
| Total | Izzat Artykov; Kyrgyzstan | 338 kg | Yuan Chengfei; China | 335 kg | Kwon Yong-gwang; North Korea | 322 kg |
77 kg
| Snatch | Feng Lüdong; China | 160 kg | Chatuphum Chinnawong; Thailand | 158 kg | Shi Zhiyong; China | 157 kg |
| Clean & Jerk | Shi Zhiyong; China | 191 kg | Pornchai Lobsi; Thailand | 190 kg | Chatuphum Chinnawong; Thailand | 189 kg |
| Total | Shi Zhiyong; China | 348 kg | Chatuphum Chinnawong; Thailand | 347 kg | Pornchai Lobsi; Thailand | 346 kg |
85 kg
| Snatch | Denis Ulanov; Kazakhstan | 168 kg | Su Ying; China | 165 kg | Yu Dong-ju; South Korea | 161 kg |
| Clean & Jerk | Denis Ulanov; Kazakhstan | 205 kg | Ayoub Mousavi; Iran | 198 kg | Fares El-Bakh; Qatar | 196 kg |
| Total | Denis Ulanov; Kazakhstan | 373 kg | Ayoub Mousavi; Iran | 356 kg | Su Ying; China | 355 kg |
94 kg
| Snatch | Ali Hashemi; Iran | 174 kg | Jin Yun-seong; South Korea | 168 kg | Aidar Mamadraimov; Kyrgyzstan | 165 kg |
| Clean & Jerk | Park Han-woong; South Korea | 208 kg | Ali Hashemi; Iran | 200 kg | Jin Yun-seong; South Korea | 200 kg |
| Total | Ali Hashemi; Iran | 374 kg | Park Han-woong; South Korea | 368 kg | Jin Yun-seong; South Korea | 368 kg |
105 kg
| Snatch | Ivan Efremov; Uzbekistan | 183 kg | Salwan Jasim; Iraq | 181 kg | Mohammad Reza Barari; Iran | 180 kg |
| Clean & Jerk | Mohammad Reza Barari; Iran | 221 kg | Sardorbek Dusmurotov; Uzbekistan | 218 kg | Ivan Efremov; Uzbekistan | 211 kg |
| Total | Mohammad Reza Barari; Iran | 401 kg | Ivan Efremov; Uzbekistan | 394 kg | Sardorbek Dusmurotov; Uzbekistan | 386 kg |
+105 kg
| Snatch | Ruslan Nurudinov; Uzbekistan | 191 kg | Chen Shih-chieh; Chinese Taipei | 191 kg | Hojamuhammet Toýçyýew; Turkmenistan | 190 kg |
| Clean & Jerk | Bahador Molaei; Iran | 247 kg | Chen Shih-chieh; Chinese Taipei | 241 kg | Hojamuhammet Toýçyýew; Turkmenistan | 237 kg |
| Total | Chen Shih-chieh; Chinese Taipei | 432 kg | Hojamuhammet Toýçyýew; Turkmenistan | 427 kg | Bahador Molaei; Iran | 427 kg |

=== Women ===
| Event | Gold | | Silver | | Bronze | |
48 kg
| Snatch | Tan Yayun; China | 88 kg | Vương Thị Huyền; Vietnam | 87 kg | Chen Wei-ling; Chinese Taipei | 85 kg |
| Clean & Jerk | Ryang Chun-hwa; North Korea | 111 kg | Panida Khamsri; Thailand | 110 kg | Tan Yayun; China | 110 kg |
| Total | Tan Yayun; China | 198 kg | Ryang Chun-hwa; North Korea | 196 kg | Panida Khamsri; Thailand | 194 kg |
53 kg
| Snatch | Chen Xiaoting; China | 96 kg | Zhang Wanqiong; China | 95 kg | Hidilyn Diaz; Philippines | 90 kg |
| Clean & Jerk | Chen Xiaoting; China | 125 kg | Hidilyn Diaz; Philippines | 118 kg | Zhang Wanqiong; China | 116 kg |
| Total | Chen Xiaoting; China | 221 kg | Zhang Wanqiong; China | 211 kg | Hidilyn Diaz; Philippines | 208 kg |
58 kg
| Snatch | Zhou Jun; China | 103 kg | Kuo Hsing-chun; Chinese Taipei | 103 kg | Li Ping; China | 100 kg |
| Clean & Jerk | Kuo Hsing-chun; Chinese Taipei | 135 kg | Li Ping; China | 130 kg | Zhou Jun; China | 130 kg |
| Total | Kuo Hsing-chun; Chinese Taipei | 238 kg | Zhou Jun; China | 233 kg | Li Ping; China | 230 kg |
63 kg
| Snatch | Siripuch Gulnoi; Thailand | 103 kg | Chen Guiming; China | 96 kg | Kim Ye-ra; South Korea | 95 kg |
| Clean & Jerk | Siripuch Gulnoi; Thailand | 131 kg | Chen Guiming; China | 121 kg | Nguyễn Thị Tuyết Mai; Vietnam | 120 kg |
| Total | Siripuch Gulnoi; Thailand | 234 kg | Chen Guiming; China | 217 kg | Nguyễn Thị Tuyết Mai; Vietnam | 211 kg |
69 kg
| Snatch | Zhang Wangli; China | 110 kg | Hung Wan-ting; Chinese Taipei | 95 kg | Gülnabat Kadyrowa; Turkmenistan | 92 kg |
| Clean & Jerk | Zhang Wangli; China | 135 kg | Lê Thị Thắm; Vietnam | 120 kg | Hung Wan-ting; Chinese Taipei | 119 kg |
| Total | Zhang Wangli; China | 245 kg | Hung Wan-ting; Chinese Taipei | 214 kg | Lê Thị Thắm; Vietnam | 210 kg |
75 kg
| Snatch | Mönkhjantsangiin Ankhtsetseg; Mongolia | 112 kg | Kang Yeoun-hee; South Korea | 104 kg | Yao Chi-ling; Chinese Taipei | 103 kg |
| Clean & Jerk | Mönkhjantsangiin Ankhtsetseg; Mongolia | 132 kg | Kang Yeoun-hee; South Korea | 131 kg | Yao Chi-ling; Chinese Taipei | 130 kg |
| Total | Mönkhjantsangiin Ankhtsetseg; Mongolia | 244 kg | Kang Yeoun-hee; South Korea | 235 kg | Yao Chi-ling; Chinese Taipei | 233 kg |
+75 kg
| Snatch | Chitchanok Pulsabsakul; Thailand | 132 kg | Kim Kuk-hyang; North Korea | 131 kg | Praeonapa Khenjantuek; Thailand | 105 kg |
| Clean & Jerk | Kim Kuk-hyang; North Korea | 160 kg | Chitchanok Pulsabsakul; Thailand | 155 kg | Praeonapa Khenjantuek; Thailand | 132 kg |
| Total | Kim Kuk-hyang; North Korea | 291 kg | Chitchanok Pulsabsakul; Thailand | 287 kg | Praeonapa Khenjantuek; Thailand | 237 kg |

== Medal table ==
Ranking by Big (Total result) medals

| Rank | Nation | Gold | Silver | Bronze | Total |
|---|---|---|---|---|---|
| 1 | China | 5 | 4 | 3 | 12 |
| 2 | Chinese Taipei | 2 | 1 | 1 | 4 |
| 2 | Iran | 2 | 1 | 1 | 4 |
| 4 | Thailand | 1 | 3 | 3 | 7 |
| 5 | North Korea | 1 | 1 | 1 | 3 |
| 6 | Japan | 1 | 0 | 0 | 1 |
| 6 | Kazakhstan | 1 | 0 | 0 | 1 |
| 6 | Kyrgyzstan | 1 | 0 | 0 | 1 |
| 6 | Mongolia | 1 | 0 | 0 | 1 |
| 10 | South Korea | 0 | 2 | 1 | 3 |
| 11 | Vietnam | 0 | 1 | 2 | 3 |
| 12 | Uzbekistan | 0 | 1 | 1 | 2 |
| 13 | Turkmenistan | 0 | 1 | 0 | 1 |
| 14 | Iraq | 0 | 0 | 1 | 1 |
| 14 | Philippines | 0 | 0 | 1 | 1 |
| Totals (15 entries) | | 15 | 15 | 15 | 45 |

Ranking by all medals: Big (Total result) and Small (Snatch and Clean & Jerk)

| Rank | Nation | Gold | Silver | Bronze | Total |
|---|---|---|---|---|---|
| 1 | China | 14 | 12 | 9 | 35 |
| 2 | Thailand | 5 | 8 | 6 | 19 |
| 3 | Iran | 5 | 3 | 2 | 10 |
| 4 | Chinese Taipei | 3 | 5 | 5 | 13 |
| 5 | North Korea | 3 | 2 | 2 | 7 |
| 6 | Kyrgyzstan | 3 | 0 | 1 | 4 |
| 7 | Kazakhstan | 3 | 0 | 0 | 3 |
| 7 | Mongolia | 3 | 0 | 0 | 3 |
| 9 | Uzbekistan | 2 | 2 | 3 | 7 |
| 10 | Japan | 2 | 1 | 0 | 3 |
| 11 | South Korea | 1 | 5 | 4 | 10 |
| 12 | Vietnam | 1 | 3 | 3 | 7 |
| 13 | Iraq | 0 | 2 | 2 | 4 |
| 14 | Philippines | 0 | 1 | 3 | 4 |
| 14 | Turkmenistan | 0 | 1 | 3 | 4 |
| 16 | Indonesia | 0 | 0 | 1 | 1 |
| 16 | Qatar | 0 | 0 | 1 | 1 |
| Totals (17 entries) | | 45 | 45 | 45 | 135 |

== Team ranking ==
=== Men ===
| Rank | Team | Points |
|---|---|---|
| 1 | Iran | 511 |
| 2 | China | 506 |
| 3 | Uzbekistan | 463 |
| 4 | Japan | 432 |
| 5 | South Korea | 426 |
| 6 | Iraq | 386 |

=== Women ===
| Rank | Team | Points |
|---|---|---|
| 1 | China | 542 |
| 2 | Thailand | 479 |
| 3 | Uzbekistan | 394 |
| 4 | Vietnam | 390 |
| 5 | India | 369 |
| 6 | Mongolia | 357 |

== Participating nations ==
258 athletes from 32 nations competed.

- Afghanistan (3)
- Bangladesh (4)
- China (14)
- Chinese Taipei (10)
- Hong Kong (1)
- India (15)
- Indonesia (12)
- Iran (8)
- Iraq (13)
- Japan (13)
- Jordan (4)
- Kazakhstan (2)
- Kyrgyzstan (15)
- Lebanon (1)
- Malaysia (8)
- Mongolia (15)
- Nepal (1)
- North Korea (3)
- Pakistan (1)
- Philippines (10)
- Qatar (1)
- Saudi Arabia (8)
- South Korea (12)
- Sri Lanka (8)
- Syria (8)
- Tajikistan (6)
- Thailand (12)
- Turkmenistan (14)
- United Arab Emirates (10)
- Uzbekistan (15)
- Vietnam (9)
- Yemen (2)
