= Weightlifting at the 2018 Asian Games =

- Venue: Jakarta International Expo
- Dates: 20–27 August 2018
- Competitors: 164 from 29 nations

Weightlifting at the 2018 Asian Games was held at the Jakarta International Expo Hall A, Jakarta, Indonesia, from 20 to 27 August 2018.

China and Kazakhstan did not participate as their weightlifting federations were suspended by the IWF from October 2017 to October 2018.

== Schedule ==
B	Group B	A	Group A

Event↓/Date →	20th Mon	21st Tue		22nd Wed		23rd Thu		24th Fri		25th Sat	26th Sun	27th Mon
Men's 56 kg	A											
Men's 62 kg		B	A									
Men's 69 kg				B	A							
Men's 77 kg						B	A					
Men's 85 kg								B	A			
Men's 94 kg										A		
Men's 105 kg											A	
Men's +105 kg												A
Women's 48 kg	A											
Women's 53 kg		A										
Women's 58 kg						A						
Women's 63 kg								A				
Women's 69 kg										A		
Women's 75 kg											A	
Women's +75 kg												A

== Medalists ==
=== Men ===
Event	Gold	Silver	Bronze
56 kg	Om Yun-chol; North Korea	Thạch Kim Tuấn; Vietnam	Surahmat Wijoyo; Indonesia
62 kg	Eko Yuli Irawan; Indonesia	Trịnh Văn Vinh; Vietnam	Adkhamjon Ergashev; Uzbekistan
69 kg	O Kang-chol; North Korea	Doston Yokubov; Uzbekistan	Izzat Artykov; Kyrgyzstan
77 kg	Choe Jon-wi; North Korea	Kim Woo-jae; South Korea	Chatuphum Chinnawong; Thailand
85 kg	Safaa Rashed; Iraq	Jang Yeon-hak; South Korea	Jon Myong-song; North Korea
94 kg	Sohrab Moradi; Iran	Fares El-Bakh; Qatar	Sarat Sumpradit; Thailand
105 kg	Ruslan Nurudinov; Uzbekistan	Salwan Jasim; Iraq	Ali Hashemi; Iran
+105 kg	Behdad Salimi; Iran	Saeid Alihosseini; Iran	Rustam Djangabaev; Uzbekistan

=== Women ===
Event	Gold	Silver	Bronze
48 kg	Ri Song-gum; North Korea	Sri Wahyuni Agustiani; Indonesia	Thunya Sukcharoen; Thailand
53 kg	Hidilyn Diaz; Philippines	Kristina Şermetowa; Turkmenistan	Surodchana Khambao; Thailand
58 kg	Kuo Hsing-chun; Chinese Taipei	Sukanya Srisurat; Thailand	Mikiko Ando; Japan
63 kg	Kim Hyo-sim; North Korea	Choe Hyo-sim; North Korea	Rattanawan Wamalun; Thailand
69 kg	Rim Un-sim; North Korea	Hung Wan-ting; Chinese Taipei	Mun Yu-ra; South Korea
75 kg	Rim Jong-sim; North Korea	Omadoy Otakuziyeva; Uzbekistan	Mun Min-hee; South Korea
+75 kg	Kim Kuk-hyang; North Korea	Son Young-hee; South Korea	Duangaksorn Chaidee; Thailand

== Medal table ==
Rank	Nation	Gold	Silver	Bronze	Total
1	North Korea (PRK)	8	1	1	10
2	Iran (IRI)	2	1	1	4
3	Uzbekistan (UZB)	1	2	2	5
4	Indonesia (INA)	1	1	1	3
5	Chinese Taipei (TPE)	1	1	0	2
5	Iraq (IRQ)	1	1	0	2
7	Philippines (PHI)	1	0	0	1
8	South Korea (KOR)	0	3	2	5
9	Vietnam (VIE)	0	2	0	2
10	Thailand (THA)	0	1	6	7
11	Qatar (QAT)	0	1	0	1
11	Turkmenistan (TKM)	0	1	0	1
13	Japan (JPN)	0	0	1	1
13	Kyrgyzstan (KGZ)	0	0	1	1
Totals (14 entries)		15	15	15	45

== Participating nations ==
A total of 164 athletes from 29 nations competed in weightlifting at the 2018 Asian Games:

- Afghanistan (2)
- Bangladesh (1)
- Brunei (1)
- Chinese Taipei (10)
- India (4)
- Indonesia (13)
- Iran (8)
- Iraq (5)
- Japan (15)
- Kyrgyzstan (3)
- Laos (2)
- Mongolia (2)
- Nepal (4)
- North Korea (13)
- Pakistan (4)
- Palestine (2)
- Philippines (7)
- Qatar (1)
- Saudi Arabia (7)
- South Korea (15)
- Sri Lanka (4)
- Syria (1)
- Tajikistan (1)
- Thailand (15)
- Timor-Leste (4)
- Turkmenistan (5)
- United Arab Emirates (1)
- Uzbekistan (8)
- Vietnam (6)
