= Ondrej Kružel =

Slovak weightlifter

Personal information
- Full name: Ondrej Kružel
- Born: 23 August 1988 (age 37)
- Height: 1.90 m (6 ft 3 in)
- Weight: 121.22 kg (267 lb)

Sport
- Country: Slovakia
- Sport: Weightlifting
- Updated on 9 April 2017

Ondrej Kružel (born August 23, 1988) is a Slovak male weightlifter, competing in the +105 kg category and representing Slovakia at international competitions. He participated in the men's +105 kg event at the 2011 World Weightlifting Championships, and at the 2016 Summer Olympics, finishing in eighteenth position.

Kruzel was ordered a two-year suspension from the International Weightlifting Federation for using the doping drostanolone in 2012.

== Major results ==
Year	Venue	Weight	Snatch (kg)				Clean & Jerk (kg)				Total	Rank
Year	Venue	Weight	1	2	3	Rank	1	2	3	Rank	Total	Rank
World Championships
2011	Paris, France	+105 kg	170	175	~~180~~	21	209	~~214~~	~~214~~	22	384	22
2010	Antalya, Turkey	+105 kg	157	163	~~168~~	25	199	~~205~~	~~207~~	24	362	22
2007	Chiang Mai, Thailand	+105 kg	~~145~~	145	~~152~~	34	177	182	187	27	332	31
