= Weightlifting at the 2018 Asian Games – Men's 105 kg =

Men's 105 kg at the 2018 Asian Games
- Venue: Jakarta International Expo
- Date: 26 August 2018
- Competitors: 8 from 6 nations

Medalists
gold medal	Ruslan Nurudinov	Uzbekistan
silver medal	Salwan Jasim	Iraq
bronze medal	Ali Hashemi	Iran

The Men's 105 kilograms event at the 2018 Asian Games took place on 26 August 2018 at the Jakarta International Expo Hall A.

== Schedule ==
All times are Western Indonesia Time (UTC+07:00)

Date	Time	Event
Sunday, 26 August 2018	17:00	Group A

== Records ==
Prior to this competition, the existing world, Asian and Games records were as follows.

World Record	Snatch	Andrei Aramnau (BLR)	200 kg	Beijing, China	18 August 2008
World Record	Clean & Jerk	Ilya Ilyin (KAZ)	246 kg	Grozny, Russia	12 December 2015
World Record	Total	Ilya Ilyin (KAZ)	437 kg	Grozny, Russia	12 December 2015
Asian Record	Snatch	Cui Wenhua (CHN)	195 kg	Lahti, Finland	14 November 1998
Asian Record	Clean & Jerk	Ilya Ilyin (KAZ)	246 kg	Grozny, Russia	12 December 2015
Asian Record	Total	Ilya Ilyin (KAZ)	437 kg	Grozny, Russia	12 December 2015
Games Record	Snatch	Cui Wenhua (CHN)	195 kg	Bangkok, Thailand	13 December 1998
Games Record	Clean & Jerk	Said Saif Asaad (QAT)	225 kg	Busan, South Korea	9 October 2002
Games Record	Total	Said Saif Asaad (QAT)	417 kg	Busan, South Korea	9 October 2002

== Results ==
Legend

- NM — No mark

Rank	Athlete	Group	Snatch (kg)				Clean & Jerk (kg)				Total
Rank	Athlete	Group	1	2	3	Result	1	2	3	Result	Total
1st place, gold medalist(s)	Ruslan Nurudinov (UZB)	A	183	187	191	191	222	230	—	230	421
2nd place, silver medalist(s)	Salwan Jasim (IRQ)	A	177	181	~~184~~	181	220	~~224~~	224	224	405
3rd place, bronze medalist(s)	Ali Hashemi (IRI)	A	177	181	184	184	219	~~224~~	~~224~~	219	403
4	Jeong Ki-sam (KOR)	A	175	~~180~~	180	180	215	~~220~~	~~221~~	215	395
5	Seo Hui-yeop (KOR)	A	~~174~~	~~174~~	174	174	220	~~227~~	~~227~~	220	394
6	Taro Tanaka (JPN)	A	~~165~~	165	172	172	190	200	~~206~~	200	372
7	Jamil Akhter (PAK)	A	130	~~135~~	135	135	150	158	—	158	293
—	Mohammad Reza Barari (IRI)	A	~~176~~	~~176~~	~~176~~	—	—	—	—	—	NM

== New records ==
The following records were established during the competition.

Clean & Jerk	230	Ruslan Nurudinov (UZB)	GR
Total	421	Ruslan Nurudinov (UZB)	GR
