= Yuan Chengfei =

Chinese weightlifter (born 1995)

Personal information
- Nationality: Chinese
- Born: July 14, 1995 (age 30)
- Weight: 72.95 kg (161 lb)

Sport
- Country: China
- Sport: Weightlifting
- Event: –73 kg
Medal record
Representing China
Asian Championships
Gold medal – first place	2017 Ashgabat	77 kg
Silver medal – second place	2016 Tashkent	69 kg
Silver medal – second place	2019 Ningbo	73 kg

Yuan Chengfei (born 14 July 1995) is a Chinese weightlifter and Asian Champion competing in the 69 kg division until 2018 and 73 kg from 2018, after the International Weightlifting Federation reorganized the categories.

== Career ==
In early 2019 he competed at the 2019 IWF World Cup in the 73 kg category, winning a silver medal in all lifts. He competed at the 2019 Asian Weightlifting Championships in the 73 kg category, winning silver medals in all lifts.

== Major results ==
Year	Venue	Weight	Snatch (kg)				Clean & Jerk (kg)				Total	Rank
Year	Venue	Weight	1	2	3	Rank	1	2	3	Rank	Total	Rank
Representing China
Asian Championships
2016	Tashkent, Uzbekistan	69 kg	145	150	~~151~~	2nd place, silver medalist(s)	181	185	~~188~~	2nd place, silver medalist(s)	335	2nd place, silver medalist(s)
2017	Ashgabat, Turkmenistan	77 kg	152	155	160	1st place, gold medalist(s)	185	187	195	1st place, gold medalist(s)	355	1st place, gold medalist(s)
2019	Ningbo, China	73 kg	151	156	~~161~~	2nd place, silver medalist(s)	186	~~190~~	193	2nd place, silver medalist(s)	349	2nd place, silver medalist(s)
