= Farkhodbek Sobirov =

Uzbekistani weightlifter (born 1997)

Personal information
- Born: 10 September 1997 (age 28)
- Weight: 92.89 kg (204.8 lb)

Sport
- Country: Uzbekistan
- Sport: Weightlifting
- Weight class: 94 kg
- Team: National team
- Coached by: Mansurbek Chashemov; Bakhrom Abdumalikov
Medal record
Representing Uzbekistan

Farkhodbek Sobirov (born 10 September 1997) is an Uzbekistani weightlifter competing in the 94 kg category.

== Career ==
Sobirov is a two time Junior World Champion (in 2016 and 2017)

He recently competed at the 2017 World Weightlifting Championships in the 94 kg division, winning a silver medal in the snatch portion of the competition, he was unable to make a clean & jerk and could not post a total.

== Major results ==
Year	Venue	Weight	Snatch (kg)				Clean & Jerk (kg)				Total	Rank
Year	Venue	Weight	1	2	3	Rank	1	2	3	Rank	Total	Rank
World Championships
2017	Anaheim, United States	94 kg	175	177	183	2nd place, silver medalist(s)	~~203~~	~~205~~	~~205~~	--	--	--
