= Nguyễn Thị Thúy =

Vietnamese weightlifter (born 1990)

Personal information
- Born: August 23, 1990 (age 35) Hanoi, Vietnam
- Height: 5 ft 0 in (1.52 m)
- Weight: 115 lb (52 kg)

Sport
- Country: Vietnam
- Sport: Weightlifting

Nguyễn Thị Thúy (23 August 1990, Hanoi) is a Vietnamese weightlifter. She competed at the 2012 Summer Olympics in the Women's 53 kg, finishing 8th.
