= Alexej Prochorow =

German weightlifter

Personal information
- Full name: Alexej Dmitrievic Prochorow
- Born: 30 March 1990 (age 36)
- Weight: 134.36 kg (296.2 lb)

Sport
- Country: Germany
- Sport: Weightlifting
- Team: National team
- Updated on 1 September 2016

Alexej Dmitrievic Prochorow (born 30 March 1990) is a German male weightlifter. He participated at the 2016 Summer Olympics in the men's +105 kg event finishing 16th. He competed in the 2014 World Weightlifting Championships the 2015 World Weightlifting Championships in the +105 kg category.
