= Mohammad Reza Barari =

Iranian weightlifter (born 1988)

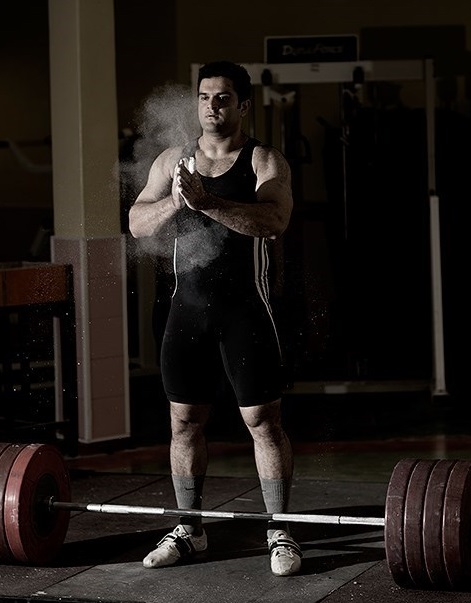

Personal information
- Nationality: Iran
- Born: March 31, 1988 (age 38) Sari, Mazandaran, Iran
- Height: 1.80 m (5 ft 11 in)
- Weight: 105 kg (231 lb)

Sport
- Country: Iran
- Sport: Weightlifting
- Event: 105 kg

Achievements and titles
- Personal bests: Snatch: 186 kg (2016); Clean and jerk: 221 kg (2011); Total: 406 kg (2016)
Medal record
Men's weightlifting
Representing Iran
Asian Championships
Gold medal – first place	2016 Tashkent	105 kg
Gold medal – first place	2017 Ashgabat	105 kg
Islamic Solidarity Games
Gold medal – first place	2017 Baku	105 kg

Mohammad Reza Barari (Persian: محمدرضا براری, born 31 March 1988 in Sari, Mazandaran) is an Iranian weightlifter. He competed at the 2013 World Championships in the Men's 105 kg, winning the bronze medal in clean and jerk.

Barari won a gold medal at the 2016 Asian Weightlifting championships in Uzbekistan and in an interview with Tehran Times, Barari said, "I am so happy since I made the Iranian people happy and I want to make them happy once again this time in the 2016 Summer Olympics". He finished in 6th place at the 2016 Summer Olympics.

== Major results ==
Year	Venue	Weight	Snatch (kg)				Clean & Jerk (kg)				Total	Rank
Year	Venue	Weight	1	2	3	Rank	1	2	3	Rank	Total	Rank
Olympic Games
2016	Rio de Janeiro, Brazil	105 kg	180	~~185~~	186	6	220	~~230~~	~~231~~	6	406	6
World Championships
2010	Antalya, Turkey	105 kg	167	~~173~~	~~173~~	19	210	~~220~~	~~220~~	11	377	14
2011	Paris, France	105 kg	170	~~175~~	~~175~~	15	211	~~221~~	221	8	391	10
2013	Wrocław, Poland	105 kg	171	176	~~179~~	8	212	~~221~~	221	3rd place, bronze medalist(s)	397	4
Asian Championships
2016	Tashkent, Uzbekistan	105 kg	172	176	180	3rd place, bronze medalist(s)	210	217	221	1st place, gold medalist(s)	401	1st place, gold medalist(s)
2017	Ashgabat, Turkmenistan	105 kg	~~175~~	~~176~~	177	1st place, gold medalist(s)	206	214	221	1st place, gold medalist(s)	398	1st place, gold medalist(s)
Summer Universiade
2013	Kazan, Russia	105 kg	165	170	~~173~~	4	~~210~~	~~211~~	~~211~~	--	--	--
Islamic Solidarity Games
2017	Baku, Azerbaijan	105 kg	175	~~179~~	~~181~~	2	212	~~217~~	220	1	395	1st place, gold medalist(s)
Fajr cup
2016	Tehran, Iran	105 kg	~~176~~	176	184	1st place, gold medalist(s)	210	220	~~228~~	1st place, gold medalist(s)	404	1st place, gold medalist(s)
