= Behdad Salimi =

Iranian weightlifter (born 1989)

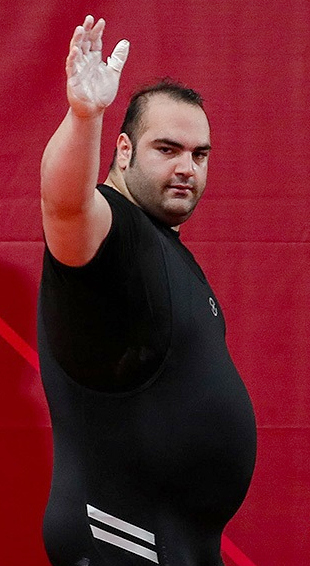
- Salimi at the 2018 Asian Games

Personal information
- Full name: Behdad Salimi Kordasiabi
- Nickname: "Iranian Hercules"
- Nationality: Iranian
- Born: 8 December 1989 (age 36) Ghaemshahr, Mazandaran, Iran
- Education: Physical Education; Qaemshahr University
- Height: 1.97 m (6 ft 6 in)

Sport
- Country: Iran
- Sport: Weightlifting
- Event: +105 kg
- Club: Zob Ahan; Melli Haffari
- Coached by: Ghasem Ghazalian; Kourosh Bagheri; Mohammad Hossein Barkhah

Achievements and titles
- Personal bests: Snatch: 216 kg (2016); Clean and jerk: 255 kg (2014, AGR); Total: 465 kg (2014, AGR)
Medal record
Men's weightlifting
Representing Iran
Olympic Games
Gold medal – first place	2012 London	+105 kg
World Championships
Gold medal – first place	2010 Antalya	+105 kg
Gold medal – first place	2011 Paris	+105 kg
Silver medal – second place	2014 Almaty	+105 kg
Bronze medal – third place	2017 Anaheim	+105 kg
Asian Games
Gold medal – first place	2010 Guangzhou	+105 kg
Gold medal – first place	2014 Incheon	+105 kg
Gold medal – first place	2018 Jakarta	+105 kg
Asian Championships
Gold medal – first place	2009 Taldykorgan	+105 kg
Gold medal – first place	2011 Tongling	+105 kg
Gold medal – first place	2012 Pyeongtaek	+105 kg

Behdad Salimi Kordasiabi (Persian: بهداد سلیمی كردآسیابی, born 8 December 1989) is former Iranian heavyweight weightlifter. He won gold medals at the 2012 Olympics, 2010–2018 Asian Games, 2010 and 2011 World Championships and 2009–2012 Asian Championships. He served as the flag bearer for Iran at the opening ceremony of the 2014 Asian Games.

== Career ==
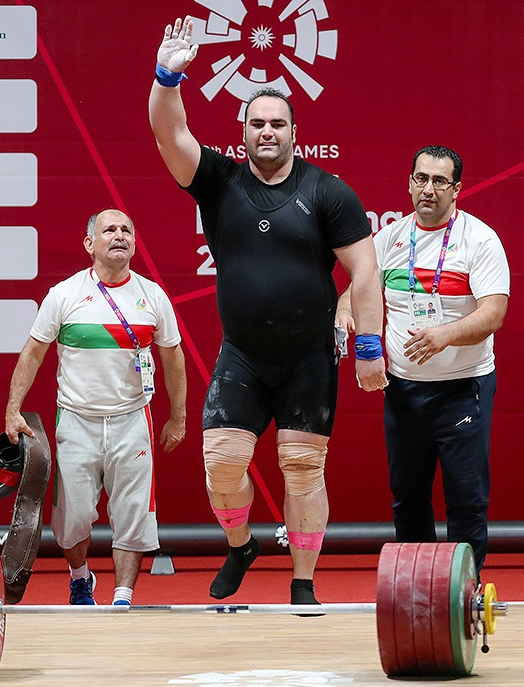
Salimi with coaches at the 2018 Asian Games

At the 2010 World Weightlifting Championships Salimi won the gold medal in the +105 kg category. Salimi won gold again in the +105 kg category at the 2010 Asian Games with a 205 kg snatch and a 235 kg clean and jerk.

Salimi won the gold medal at the 2011 World Weightlifting Championships in Paris, France on 13 November 2011 and set a new snatch world record of 214 kg.

Salimi became the 2012 Olympic gold medalist in the +105kg category on 7 August 2012 with a 208 kg snatch and a 247 kg clean and jerk for a total of 455 kg.

Despite a torn ACL, total knee re-construction and over two years out of the game, Behdad Salimi returned to weightlifting in 2016 to compete in the Fajr Cup, held in Tehran, Iran and won gold.

At the Rio 2016 Olympics, he broke the world record snatch set moments before by Lasha Talakhadze, making 216 kg, in the clean and jerk he initially completed a lift of 245 kg which was approved by 2 of the three judges before being disqualified by the 5 member jury. Iran's National Olympics Committee filed an application to the CAS. The International Weightlifting Federation website was hacked the next morning and its Instagram page flooded with over 285,000 comments.

=== Leaving National Team ===
After 2012 London Olympic games he and other Olympic medalists of Iran protested against Iran's national weightlifting team head coach Kourosh Bagheri for using offensive language in training and declined to attend national team exercises. As a result of a heavy argument on a live TV debate between Salimi and Kourosh Bagheri, the Iranian Weightlifting Federation dismissed Salimi and other weightlifters and did not invite any of the London medalists for the 2013 Asian Weightlifting Championships and 2013 World Weightlifting Championships.

=== Retirement ===
After winning his third gold medal at the 2018 Asian Games, with a total of 461 kg, Salimi announced his retirement from the sport.

== Major results ==
Year	Venue	Weight	Snatch (kg)				Clean & Jerk (kg)				Total	Rank
Year	Venue	Weight	1	2	3	Rank	1	2	3	Rank	Total	Rank
Olympic Games
2012	London, United Kingdom	+105 kg	201	205	208	2	247	~~264~~	--	1	455	1st place, gold medalist(s)
2016	Rio de Janeiro, Brazil	+105 kg	206	211	216 WR	1	~~245~~	~~245~~	~~245~~	-	-	-
World Championships
2010	Antalya, Turkey	+105 kg	203	208	~~211~~	2nd place, silver medalist(s)	241	245	~~247~~	2nd place, silver medalist(s)	453	1st place, gold medalist(s)
2011	Paris, France	+105 kg	201	209	214 WR	1st place, gold medalist(s)	241	250	~~260~~	1st place, gold medalist(s)	464	1st place, gold medalist(s)
2014	Almaty, Kazakhstan	+105 kg	206	~~211~~	~~211~~	2nd place, silver medalist(s)	246	251	~~257~~	3rd place, bronze medalist(s)	457	2nd place, silver medalist(s)
2017	Anaheim, United States	+105 kg	205	211	~~216~~	2nd place, silver medalist(s)	~~241~~	242	~~252~~	5	453	3rd place, bronze medalist(s)
Asian Games
2010	Guangzhou, China	+105 kg	~~201~~	201	205	1	235	~~241~~	~~241~~	2	440	1st place, gold medalist(s)
2014	Incheon, South Korea	+105 kg	200	210	~~215~~	1	241	255	--	1	465	1st place, gold medalist(s)
2018	Jakarta, Indonesia	+105 kg	200	~~206~~	208	2	237	246	253	1	461	1st place, gold medalist(s)
Asian Championships
2009	(Kazakhstan) Taldykorgan, kazakhstan	+105 kg	180	190	~~197~~	1st place, gold medalist(s)	220	231	--	1st place, gold medalist(s)	421	1st place, gold medalist(s)
2011	Tongling, China	+105 kg	200	205	208	1st place, gold medalist(s)	241	250	--	1st place, gold medalist(s)	458	1st place, gold medalist(s)
2012	Pyeongtaek, South Korea	+105 kg	196	201	206	1st place, gold medalist(s)	245	~~260~~	~~260~~	1st place, gold medalist(s)	451	1st place, gold medalist(s)
Fajr cup
2016	Tehran, Iran	+105 kg	195	201	205	1st place, gold medalist(s)	225	~~231~~	~~231~~	3rd place, bronze medalist(s)	430	1st place, gold medalist(s)
World Junior Championships
2008	Cali, Colombia	+105 kg	181	186	~~190~~	2nd place, silver medalist(s)	220	~~226~~	~~226~~	3rd place, bronze medalist(s)	406	3rd place, bronze medalist(s)
2009	Bucharest, Romania	+105 kg	181	190	195	1st place, gold medalist(s)	222	228	~~235~~	1st place, gold medalist(s)	423	1st place, gold medalist(s)
Asian Junior Championships
2008	Jeonju, South Korea	+105 kg	185			2nd place, silver medalist(s)	222			2nd place, silver medalist(s)	407	2nd place, silver medalist(s)

== See also ==
- Hossein Rezazadeh
