= Park Han-woong =

South Korean weightlifter

Personal information
- Full name: Park Han-woong
- Born: 15 January 1995 (age 31)
- Height: 1.74 m (5 ft 9 in)
- Weight: 92.61 kg (204 lb)

Sport
- Country: South Korea
- Sport: Weightlifting
- Updated on 9 April 2017

Park Han-woong (Korean: 박한웅; born January 15, 1995) is a South Korean male weightlifter, competing in the 94 kg category and representing South Korea at international competitions. He participated in the men's 94 kg event at the 2015 World Weightlifting Championships, and at the 2016 Summer Olympics, finishing in tenth position.

== Major results ==
Year	Venue	Weight	Snatch (kg)				Clean & Jerk (kg)				Total	Rank
Year	Venue	Weight	1	2	3	Rank	1	2	3	Rank	Total	Rank
World Championships
2015	Houston, United States	94 kg	152	---	---	24	190	200	204	14	356	17
