= Jeon Sang-guen =

South Korean weightlifter (born 1981)

Personal information
- Nationality: South Korea
- Born: February 28, 1981 (age 45)
- Height: 1.83 m (6 ft 0 in)
- Weight: 158 kg (348 lb)

Sport
- Country: South Korea
- Sport: Weightlifting
- Event: +105 kg
Medal record
Men's weightlifting
Representing South Korea
Olympic Games
Bronze medal – third place	2012 London	+105 kg
World Championships
Bronze medal – third place	2011 Paris	+105 kg
Asian Games
Silver medal – second place	2010 Guangzhou	+105 kg
Asian Championships
Silver medal – second place	2012 Pyeongtaek	+105 kg
- Updated on 26 July 2012

Jeon Sang-guen (Korean: 전상균; born February 28, 1981) is a South Korean weightlifter. He competed at the 2008 and 2012 Olympic Games. He did not finish in 2008 but came originally fourth in 2012. Jeon was upgraded to a bronze medal for his 2012 performance in 2024 after Ruslan Albegov was retroactively disqualified.
