= 2017 World Weightlifting Championships =

International weightlifting competition

- Host city: Anaheim, United States
- Dates: 28 November – 5 December
- Main venue: Anaheim Convention Center

The 2017 World Weightlifting Championships were held in Anaheim, California, United States from 28 November to 5 December 2017.

== Doping bans ==
Nine countries were banned from competing at the World Championships due to their history of doping at previous Olympic Games, under International Weightlifting Federation rules stating that any country that had three positive tests uncovered by the International Olympic Committee during re-testing of stored urine samples for banned substances from the 2008 and 2012 Olympics would be banned.

The banned countries were: Russia, China, Kazakhstan, Armenia, Turkey, Moldova, Ukraine, Belarus and Azerbaijan.

== Boycott ==
North Korea and Venezuela boycotted the World Championships due to the crises in relations between the United States and these countries. The World Championships organizing committee had said it did not foresee any visa problems for the North Korean team.

== Medal summary ==
=== Men ===
Event	Gold		Silver		Bronze	
56 kg
Snatch	Thạch Kim Tuấn; Vietnam	126 kg	Trần Lê Quốc Toàn; Vietnam	119 kg	Josué Brachi; Spain	118 kg
Clean & Jerk	Thạch Kim Tuấn; Vietnam	153 kg	Trần Lê Quốc Toàn; Vietnam	151 kg	Carlos Berna; Colombia	149 kg
Total	Thạch Kim Tuấn; Vietnam	279 kg	Trần Lê Quốc Toàn; Vietnam	270 kg	Carlos Berna; Colombia	266 kg
62 kg
Snatch	Trịnh Văn Vinh; Vietnam	136 kg	Han Myeong-mok; South Korea	135 kg	Adkhamjon Ergashev; Uzbekistan	135 kg
Clean & Jerk	Francisco Mosquera; Colombia	170 kg	José Montes; Mexico	167 kg	Antonio Vázquez; Mexico	165 kg
Total	Francisco Mosquera; Colombia	300 kg	Yoichi Itokazu; Japan	299 kg	Shota Mishvelidze; Georgia	298 kg
69 kg
Snatch	Won Jeong-sik; South Korea	148 kg	Tairat Bunsuk; Thailand	147 kg	Mirko Zanni; Italy	144 kg
Clean & Jerk	Doston Yokubov; Uzbekistan	179 kg	Won Jeong-sik; South Korea	178 kg	Bernardin Matam; France	177 kg
Total	Won Jeong-sik; South Korea	326 kg	Tairat Bunsuk; Thailand	321 kg	Bernardin Matam; France	318 kg
77 kg
Snatch	Mohamed Ehab; Egypt	165 kg	Rejepbaý Rejepow; Turkmenistan	158 kg	Erkand Qerimaj; Albania	155 kg
Clean & Jerk	Mohamed Ehab; Egypt	196 kg	Rejepbaý Rejepow; Turkmenistan	194 kg	Harrison Maurus; United States	193 kg
Total	Mohamed Ehab; Egypt	361 kg	Rejepbaý Rejepow; Turkmenistan	352 kg	Harrison Maurus; United States	348 kg
85 kg
Snatch	Arley Méndez; Chile	175 kg	Kianoush Rostami; Iran	174 kg	Antonino Pizzolato; Italy	162 kg
Clean & Jerk	Arley Méndez; Chile	203 kg	Krzysztof Zwarycz; Poland	197 kg	Romain Imadouchène; France	196 kg
Total	Arley Méndez; Chile	378 kg	Krzysztof Zwarycz; Poland	359 kg	Antonino Pizzolato; Italy	358 kg
94 kg
Snatch	Sohrab Moradi; Iran	184 kg	Farkhodbek Sobirov; Uzbekistan	183 kg	Ragab Abdelhay; Egypt	172 kg
Clean & Jerk	Sohrab Moradi; Iran	233 kg WR	Fares El-Bakh; Qatar	220 kg	Ayoub Mousavi; Iran	214 kg
Total	Sohrab Moradi; Iran	417 kg WR	Ayoub Mousavi; Iran	385 kg	Fares El-Bakh; Qatar	383 kg
105 kg
Snatch	Ali Hashemi; Iran	183 kg	Ivan Efremov; Uzbekistan	182 kg	Jorge Arroyo; Ecuador	181 kg
Clean & Jerk	Seo Hui-yeop; South Korea	222 kg	Artūrs Plēsnieks; Latvia	222 kg	Ali Hashemi; Iran	221 kg
Total	Ali Hashemi; Iran	404 kg	Artūrs Plēsnieks; Latvia	402 kg	Ivan Efremov; Uzbekistan	399 kg
+105 kg
Snatch	Lasha Talakhadze; Georgia	220 kg WR	Behdad Salimi; Iran	211 kg	Saeid Alihosseini; Iran	203 kg
Clean & Jerk	Lasha Talakhadze; Georgia	257 kg	Mart Seim; Estonia	253 kg	Saeid Alihosseini; Iran	251 kg
Total	Lasha Talakhadze; Georgia	477 kg WR	Saeid Alihosseini; Iran	454 kg	Behdad Salimi; Iran	453 kg

=== Women ===
Event	Gold		Silver		Bronze	
48 kg
Snatch	Thunya Sukcharoen; Thailand	86 kg	Mirabai Chanu; India	85 kg	Ana Segura; Colombia	81 kg
Clean & Jerk	Mirabai Chanu; India	109 kg	Thunya Sukcharoen; Thailand	107 kg	Chiraphan Nanthawong; Thailand	102 kg
Total	Mirabai Chanu; India	194 kg	Thunya Sukcharoen; Thailand	193 kg	Ana Segura; Colombia	182 kg
53 kg
Snatch	Sopita Tanasan; Thailand	96 kg	Kristina Şermetowa; Turkmenistan	91 kg	Joanna Łochowska; Poland	87 kg
Clean & Jerk	Sopita Tanasan; Thailand	114 kg	Hidilyn Diaz; Philippines	113 kg	Kristina Şermetowa; Turkmenistan	113 kg
Total	Sopita Tanasan; Thailand	210 kg	Kristina Şermetowa; Turkmenistan	204 kg	Hidilyn Diaz; Philippines	199 kg
58 kg
Snatch	Sukanya Srisurat; Thailand	105 kg	Kuo Hsing-chun; Chinese Taipei	105 kg	Rebeka Koha; Latvia	101 kg
Clean & Jerk	Kuo Hsing-chun; Chinese Taipei	135 kg	Mikiko Ando; Japan	126 kg	Alexandra Escobar; Ecuador	122 kg
Total	Kuo Hsing-chun; Chinese Taipei	240 kg	Sukanya Srisurat; Thailand	225 kg	Rebeka Koha; Latvia	222 kg
63 kg
Snatch	Loredana Toma; Romania	109 kg	Maude Charron; Canada	102 kg	Lina Rivas; Colombia	101 kg
Clean & Jerk	Loredana Toma; Romania	128 kg	Rattanawan Wamalun; Thailand	127 kg	Lina Rivas; Colombia	124 kg
Total	Loredana Toma; Romania	237 kg	Lina Rivas; Colombia	225 kg	Mercedes Pérez; Colombia	225 kg
69 kg
Snatch	Miyareth Mendoza; Colombia	106 kg	Mattie Rogers; United States	104 kg	Leydi Solís; Colombia	104 kg
Clean & Jerk	Sara Ahmed; Egypt	136 kg	Leydi Solís; Colombia	135 kg	Mattie Rogers; United States	131 kg
Total	Leydi Solís; Colombia	239 kg	Mattie Rogers; United States	235 kg	Miyareth Mendoza; Colombia	233 kg
75 kg
Snatch	Lydia Valentín; Spain	118 kg	Neisi Dájomes; Ecuador	108 kg	Mönkhjantsangiin Ankhtsetseg; Mongolia	107 kg
Clean & Jerk	Lydia Valentín; Spain	140 kg	Gaëlle Nayo-Ketchanke; France	134 kg	Neisi Dájomes; Ecuador	132 kg
Total	Lydia Valentín; Spain	258 kg	Neisi Dájomes; Ecuador	240 kg	Gaëlle Nayo-Ketchanke; France	237 kg
90 kg
Snatch	Anastasiia Hotfrid; Georgia	120 kg	Crismery Santana; Dominican Republic	113 kg	Oliba Nieve; Ecuador	112 kg
Clean & Jerk	María Fernanda Valdés; Chile	146 kg	Anastasiia Hotfrid; Georgia	145 kg	Crismery Santana; Dominican Republic	141 kg
Total	Anastasiia Hotfrid; Georgia	265 kg	María Fernanda Valdés; Chile	255 kg	Crismery Santana; Dominican Republic	254 kg
+90 kg
Snatch	Sarah Robles; United States	126 kg	Laurel Hubbard; New Zealand	124 kg	Tania Mascorro; Mexico	119 kg
Clean & Jerk	Sarah Robles; United States	158 kg	Shaimaa Khalaf; Egypt	153 kg	Duangaksorn Chaidee; Thailand	152 kg
Total	Sarah Robles; United States	284 kg	Laurel Hubbard; New Zealand	275 kg	Shaimaa Khalaf; Egypt	268 kg

== Medal table ==
Ranking by Big (Total result) medals

Rank	Nation	Gold	Silver	Bronze	Total
1	Iran	2	2	1	5
2	Colombia	2	1	4	7
3	Georgia	2	0	1	3
4	Thailand	1	3	0	4
5	United States	1	1	1	3
6	Chile	1	1	0	2
6	Vietnam	1	1	0	2
8	Egypt	1	0	1	2
9	Chinese Taipei	1	0	0	1
9	India	1	0	0	1
9	Romania	1	0	0	1
9	South Korea	1	0	0	1
9	Spain	1	0	0	1
14	Turkmenistan	0	2	0	2
15	Latvia	0	1	1	2
16	Ecuador	0	1	0	1
16	Japan	0	1	0	1
16	New Zealand	0	1	0	1
16	Poland	0	1	0	1
20	France	0	0	2	2
21	Dominican Republic	0	0	1	1
21	Italy	0	0	1	1
21	Philippines	0	0	1	1
21	Qatar	0	0	1	1
21	Uzbekistan	0	0	1	1
Totals (25 entries)		16	16	16	48

Ranking by all medals: Big (Total result) and Small (Snatch and Clean & Jerk)

Rank	Nation	Gold	Silver	Bronze	Total
1	Thailand	5	6	2	13
2	Iran	5	4	5	14
3	Georgia	5	1	1	7
4	Vietnam	4	3	0	7
5	Colombia	4	2	9	15
6	Egypt	4	1	2	7
7	Chile	4	1	0	5
8	United States	3	2	3	8
9	South Korea	3	2	0	5
10	Spain	3	0	1	4
11	Romania	3	0	0	3
12	Chinese Taipei	2	1	0	3
12	India	2	1	0	3
14	Uzbekistan	1	2	2	5
15	Turkmenistan	0	5	1	6
16	Ecuador	0	2	4	6
17	Latvia	0	2	2	4
18	Poland	0	2	1	3
19	Japan	0	2	0	2
19	New Zealand	0	2	0	2
21	France	0	1	4	5
22	Dominican Republic	0	1	2	3
22	Mexico	0	1	2	3
24	Philippines	0	1	1	2
24	Qatar	0	1	1	2
26	Canada	0	1	0	1
26	Estonia	0	1	0	1
28	Italy	0	0	3	3
29	Albania	0	0	1	1
29	Mongolia	0	0	1	1
Totals (30 entries)		48	48	48	144

== Team ranking ==
=== Men ===
Rank	Team	Points
1	Iran	512
2	South Korea	457
3	Uzbekistan	355
4	Spain	345
5	Colombia	342
6	Japan	320

=== Women ===
Rank	Team	Points
1	Thailand	496
2	Colombia	473
3	United States	472
4	Ecuador	442
5	Mexico	405
6	Japan	390

== Participating nations ==
A total of 315 competitors from 63 nations participated.

- Albania (5)
- Algeria (1)
- Austria (1)
- Belgium (1)
- Brazil (6)
- Bulgaria (5)
- Cameroon (4)
- Canada (9)
- Chile (2)
- Chinese Taipei (11)
- Colombia (16)
- Croatia (1)
- Cyprus (1)
- Czech Republic (4)
- Denmark (3)
- Dominican Republic (1)
- Ecuador (11)
- Egypt (5)
- Estonia (2)
- Fiji (2)
- Finland (5)
- France (7)
- Georgia (4)
- Germany (8)
- Ghana (3)
- Great Britain (5)
- Hungary (2)
- Iceland (4)
- India (8)
- Iran (8)
- Iraq (1)
- Ireland (1)
- Israel (5)
- Italy (8)
- Japan (15)
- Latvia (2)
- Lebanon (1)
- Lithuania (4)
- Malaysia (1)
- Mauritius (1)
- Mexico (11)
- Mongolia (3)
- New Zealand (2)
- Norway (2)
- Peru (5)
- Philippines (2)
- Poland (5)
- Qatar (1)
- Romania (6)
- Saudi Arabia (6)
- Serbia (1)
- Slovakia (1)
- South Africa (1)
- South Korea (11)
- Spain (10)
- Sweden (2)
- Thailand (16)
- Tunisia (1)
- Turkmenistan (5)
- Uganda (2)
- United States (16)
- Uzbekistan (10)
- Vietnam (12)
