= Kazuomi Ota =

Japanese weightlifter (born 1986)

Kazuomi Ota (born 1 July 1986 in Kitakyushu) is a Japanese weightlifter. He competed at the 2012 Summer Olympics in the +105 kg event.
