= Chen Shih-chieh =

Taiwanese weightlifter (born 1989)

Personal information
- Born: 27 November 1989 (age 36)
- Height: 1.90 m (6 ft 3 in)
- Weight: 152 kg (335 lb)

Sport
- Country: Chinese Taipei
- Sport: Weightlifting
- Event: +105 kg
Medal record
Asian Games
Bronze medal – third place	2014 Incheon	+105 kg
Asian Championships
Gold medal – first place	2015 Phuket	+105 kg
Gold medal – first place	2016 Tashkent	+105 kg
Silver medal – second place	2013 Astana	+105 kg
Silver medal – second place	2017 Ashgabat	+105 kg

Chen Shih-chieh (Chinese: 陳士杰; born 27 November 1989 in Pingtung, Taiwan, Republic of China) is a Taiwanese male weightlifter. At the 2012 Summer Olympics he competed for his country in the Men's +105 kg, finishing in 10th with a total of 418 kg. He earned a bronze medal at the 2014 Asian Games in the same event, lifting a combined 424 kg. The 191 kg Chen lifted in the snatch set a new Chinese Taipei record. He was unable to finish the competition at the 2016 Olympics. In 2019 he tested positive for Testosterone and was banned until 2023 by the International Weightlifting Federation.
