= 2003 World Weightlifting Championships – Men's +105 kg =

The 2003 World Weightlifting Championships were held in Vancouver, Canada from 14 November to 22 November. The men's +105 kilograms division was staged on 21 and 22 November 2003.

== Schedule ==
Date	Time	Event
21 November 2003	10:00	Group D
21 November 2003	13:30	Group C
22 November 2003	10:00	Group B
22 November 2003	12:30	Group A

== Medalists ==
Event	Gold		Silver		Bronze	
Snatch	Jaber Saeed Salem (QAT)	210.0 kg	Hossein Rezazadeh (IRI)	207.5 kg	Evgeny Chigishev (RUS)	205.0 kg
Clean & Jerk	Hossein Rezazadeh (IRI)	250.0 kg	Viktors Ščerbatihs (LAT)	245.0 kg	Velichko Cholakov (BUL)	242.5 kg
Total	Hossein Rezazadeh (IRI)	457.5 kg	Velichko Cholakov (BUL)	447.5 kg	Viktors Ščerbatihs (LAT)	445.0 kg

== Records ==
Prior to this competition, the existing world records were as follows.

World Record	Snatch	Hossein Rezazadeh (IRI)	213.0 kg	Qinhuangdao, China	14 September 2003
World Record	Clean & Jerk	Hossein Rezazadeh (IRI)	263.0 kg	Warsaw, Poland	26 November 2002
World Record	Total	Hossein Rezazadeh (IRI)	472.5 kg	Sydney, Australia	26 September 2000

== Results ==
Rank	Athlete	Group	Body weight	Snatch (kg)				Clean & Jerk (kg)				Total
Rank	Athlete	Group	Body weight	1	2	3	Rank	1	2	3	Rank	Total
1st place, gold medalist(s)	Hossein Rezazadeh (IRI)	A	155.90	200.0	207.5	~~213.5~~	2nd place, silver medalist(s)	250.0	~~263.5~~	—	1st place, gold medalist(s)	457.5
2nd place, silver medalist(s)	Velichko Cholakov (BUL)	A	157.65	192.5	200.0	205.0	4	232.5	242.5	~~247.5~~	3rd place, bronze medalist(s)	447.5
3rd place, bronze medalist(s)	Viktors Ščerbatihs (LAT)	A	135.62	~~200.0~~	200.0	~~205.0~~	5	245.0	~~252.5~~	~~252.5~~	2nd place, silver medalist(s)	445.0
4	Evgeny Chigishev (RUS)	A	115.68	197.5	~~205.0~~	205.0	3rd place, bronze medalist(s)	230.0	—	—	9	435.0
5	Oleksiy Kolokoltsev (UKR)	A	121.19	190.0	~~195.0~~	195.0	6	240.0	~~247.5~~	~~250.0~~	4	435.0
6	Ashot Danielyan (ARM)	A	159.76	~~190.0~~	190.0	~~200.0~~	9	240.0	—	—	6	430.0
7	Paweł Najdek (POL)	A	138.54	182.5	~~187.5~~	187.5	10	240.0	~~245.0~~	~~250.0~~	5	427.5
8	Shane Hamman (USA)	A	157.99	192.5	~~200.0~~	~~200.0~~	7	~~230.0~~	~~230.0~~	230.0	10	422.5
9	Grzegorz Kleszcz (POL)	B	128.17	180.0	~~185.0~~	185.0	12	225.0	230.0	235.0	7	420.0
10	Igor Khalilov (UZB)	B	141.52	177.5	182.5	185.0	14	227.5	232.5	~~237.5~~	8	417.5
11	Damyan Damyanov (BUL)	B	140.40	180.0	190.0	~~195.0~~	8	200.0	220.0	225.0	12	415.0
12	Mohamed Ihsan (EGY)	B	135.92	175.0	180.0	~~185.0~~	17	220.0	~~232.5~~	~~232.5~~	14	400.0
13	Jeon Sang-guen (KOR)	B	148.45	170.0	~~175.0~~	~~175.0~~	25	210.0	220.0	227.5	11	397.5
14	Alan Naniyev (AZE)	B	115.03	~~180.0~~	180.0	—	15	215.0	—	—	15	395.0
15	Abdesattar Habassi (TUN)	C	118.12	170.0	180.0	185.0	11	~~210.0~~	210.0	~~215.0~~	17	395.0
16	Tibor Stark (HUN)	B	135.78	180.5	185.0	—	13	210.0	—	—	20	395.0
17	Petr Sobotka (CZE)	B	150.84	175.0	180.0	~~185.0~~	18	215.0	~~220.0~~	~~220.0~~	16	395.0
18	Marius Alecu (ROM)	B	124.10	170.0	~~175.0~~	~~175.0~~	23	~~220.0~~	~~220.0~~	220.0	13	390.0
19	Apolosio Tokotuu (FRA)	C	122.83	165.0	~~170.0~~	170.0	22	~~205.0~~	205.0	210.0	18	380.0
20	Andrey Martemyanov (UZB)	C	136.57	~~165.0~~	165.0	170.0	24	~~207.5~~	207.5	~~212.5~~	22	377.5
21	Corran Hocking (AUS)	C	146.78	170.0	175.0	~~177.5~~	21	~~202.5~~	202.5	~~207.5~~	24	377.5
22	Hildegar Morillo (VEN)	C	131.62	~~160.0~~	~~160.0~~	160.0	29	210.0	~~220.0~~	~~220.0~~	19	370.0
23	Anthony Martin (AUS)	D	144.82	~~162.5~~	162.5	~~167.5~~	27	200.0	207.5	~~212.5~~	23	370.0
24	Aurimas Bulauskas (LTU)	C	142.25	155.0	~~165.0~~	~~165.0~~	30	205.0	210.0	~~217.5~~	21	365.0
25	Lorenzo Carrió (ESP)	D	114.70	155.0	~~160.0~~	160.0	28	190.0	~~197.5~~	—	26	350.0
26	Itte Detenamo (NRU)	D	133.06	~~150.0~~	150.0	~~155.0~~	31	190.0	195.0	~~202.5~~	25	345.0
27	Ahmed Keroui (ALG)	D	138.15	150.0	~~160.0~~	~~160.0~~	32	190.0	~~195.0~~	~~195.0~~	27	340.0
—	Jordi Simón (ESP)	D	105.53	~~140.0~~	~~140.0~~	~~140.0~~	—	—	—	—	—	—
—	Siarhei Karasiou (BLR)	B	123.91	175.0	180.0	~~185.0~~	16	~~220.0~~	~~220.0~~	~~220.0~~	—	—
—	Takanobu Iwazaki (JPN)	C	124.89	165.0	~~170.0~~	~~170.0~~	26	~~207.5~~	~~207.5~~	~~207.5~~	—	—
—	Jaber Saeed Salem (QAT)	A	127.44	200.0	205.0	210.0	1st place, gold medalist(s)	—	—	—	—	—
—	Haidar Dakhil (IRQ)	B	129.40	~~175.0~~	175.0	~~180.0~~	19	~~205.0~~	~~205.0~~	~~205.0~~	—	—
—	Dimitri Wolf (GER)	B	130.81	175.0	~~180.0~~	~~180.0~~	20	~~207.5~~	~~207.5~~	~~210.0~~	—	—
—	Ronny Weller (GER)	A	144.49	—	—	—	—	—	—	—	—	—
DQ	Artem Udachyn (UKR)	A	134.99	200.0	205.0	210.0	—	240.0	~~250.0~~	~~250.0~~	—	—
