= 2002 World Weightlifting Championships – Men's +105 kg =

The 2002 World Weightlifting Championships were held in Warsaw, Poland from 19 November to 26 November. The men's +105 kilograms division was staged on 26 November 2002.

== Schedule ==
Date	Time	Event
26 November 2002	14:00	Group B
26 November 2002	17:00	Group A

== Medalists ==
Event	Gold		Silver		Bronze	
Snatch	Hossein Rezazadeh (IRI)	210.0 kg	Damyan Damyanov (BUL)	205.0 kg	Artem Udachyn (UKR)	200.0 kg
Clean & Jerk	Hossein Rezazadeh (IRI)	262.5 kg	Damyan Damyanov (BUL)	245.0 kg	Paweł Najdek (POL)	240.0 kg
Total	Hossein Rezazadeh (IRI)	472.5 kg	Damyan Damyanov (BUL)	450.0 kg	Artem Udachyn (UKR)	440.0 kg

== Records ==
Prior to this competition, the existing world records were as follows.

World Record	Snatch	Hossein Rezazadeh (IRI)	212.5 kg	Sydney, Australia	26 September 2000
World Record	Clean & Jerk	World Standard	262.5 kg	—	1 January 1998
World Record	Total	Hossein Rezazadeh (IRI)	472.5 kg	Sydney, Australia	26 September 2000

== Results ==
Rank	Athlete	Group	Body weight	Snatch (kg)				Clean & Jerk (kg)				Total
Rank	Athlete	Group	Body weight	1	2	3	Rank	1	2	3	Rank	Total
1st place, gold medalist(s)	Hossein Rezazadeh (IRI)	A	157.30	200.0	205.0	210.0	1st place, gold medalist(s)	252.5	263.0	—	1st place, gold medalist(s)	472.5
2nd place, silver medalist(s)	Damyan Damyanov (BUL)	A	134.70	200.0	205.0	—	2nd place, silver medalist(s)	240.0	245.0	—	2nd place, silver medalist(s)	450.0
3rd place, bronze medalist(s)	Artem Udachyn (UKR)	A	132.70	~~195.0~~	195.0	200.0	3rd place, bronze medalist(s)	230.0	240.0	~~245.0~~	4	440.0
4	Grzegorz Kleszcz (POL)	A	121.40	185.0	190.0	~~192.5~~	9	230.0	~~235.0~~	235.0	5	425.0
5	Shane Hamman (USA)	A	169.30	190.0	~~197.5~~	197.5	4	227.5	~~235.0~~	~~235.0~~	6	425.0
6	Roman Meshcheryakov (RUS)	A	159.20	185.0	192.5	~~197.5~~	8	225.0	—	—	7	417.5
7	Siarhei Karasiou (BLR)	A	126.20	185.0	~~190.0~~	192.5	7	220.0	~~230.0~~	—	9	412.5
8	Petr Sobotka (CZE)	B	149.40	180.0	~~185.0~~	~~185.0~~	11	212.5	220.0	~~225.0~~	10	400.0
9	Mohamed Ihsan (EGY)	B	135.00	175.0	180.0	182.5	10	215.0	~~225.0~~	~~225.0~~	12	397.5
10	Takanobu Iwazaki (JPN)	B	122.55	165.0	170.0	~~175.0~~	14	210.0	222.5	~~225.0~~	8	392.5
11	Raymond Kopka (SVK)	B	126.95	175.0	~~182.5~~	~~182.5~~	13	205.0	210.0	217.5	11	392.5
12	Axel Franz (GER)	B	150.10	177.5	~~185.0~~	~~185.0~~	12	~~215.0~~	215.0	~~222.5~~	13	392.5
13	Lorenzo Carrió (ESP)	B	107.55	~~157.5~~	157.5	162.5	17	195.0	200.0	~~205.0~~	15	362.5
14	Jim Gyllenhammar (SWE)	B	116.25	~~157.5~~	157.5	~~162.5~~	20	202.5	~~210.0~~	~~210.0~~	14	360.0
15	Libor Wälzer (CZE)	B	107.75	157.5	~~162.5~~	162.5	18	195.0	~~200.0~~	200.0	16	357.5
16	Dmitriy Chursin (KAZ)	B	119.80	160.0	~~165.0~~	165.0	15	190.0	~~195.0~~	~~195.0~~	17	355.0
17	Cristián Escalante (CHI)	B	124.90	155.0	160.0	165.0	16	~~180.0~~	180.0	—	20	345.0
18	Haidar Dakhil (IRQ)	B	129.60	155.0	160.0	~~162.5~~	19	180.0	185.0	~~190.0~~	19	345.0
19	Gísli Kristjánsson (ISL)	B	114.45	~~150.0~~	150.0	~~155.0~~	21	180.0	185.0	~~187.5~~	18	335.0
20	Bruno Soto (ESP)	B	119.35	145.0	150.0	~~155.0~~	22	175.0	~~185.0~~	~~185.0~~	21	325.0
—	Paweł Najdek (POL)	A	131.90	~~182.5~~	~~182.5~~	~~185.0~~	—	240.0	~~245.0~~	~~245.0~~	3rd place, bronze medalist(s)	—
—	Ashot Danielyan (ARM)	A	159.90	~~195.0~~	~~195.0~~	195.0	5	~~237.5~~	~~242.5~~	~~242.5~~	—	—
—	Andrey Chemerkin (RUS)	A	168.50	~~195.0~~	195.0	~~200.0~~	6	~~245.0~~	~~247.5~~	~~247.5~~	—	—

== New records ==
Clean & Jerk	263.0 kg	Hossein Rezazadeh (IRI)	WR
