= 2007 World Weightlifting Championships – Men's +105 kg =

The men's competition in +105 kg division was staged on September 25–26, 2007.

== Schedule ==
Date	Time	Event
25 September 2007	20:00	Group C
26 September 2007	12:00	Group B
26 September 2007	17:00	Group A

== Medalists ==
Event	Gold		Silver		Bronze	
Snatch	Viktors Ščerbatihs (LAT)	202 kg	Evgeny Chigishev (RUS)	201 kg	Velichko Cholakov (BUL)	201 kg
Clean & Jerk	Evgeny Chigishev (RUS)	240 kg	Jaber Saeed Salem (QAT)	240 kg	Viktors Ščerbatihs (LAT)	240 kg
Total	Viktors Ščerbatihs (LAT)	442 kg	Evgeny Chigishev (RUS)	441 kg	Jaber Saeed Salem (QAT)	435 kg

== Records ==
Prior to this competition, the existing world records were as follows.

World Record	Snatch	Hossein Rezazadeh (IRI)	213 kg	Qinhuangdao, China	14 September 2003
World Record	Clean & Jerk	Hossein Rezazadeh (IRI)	263 kg	Athens, Greece	25 August 2004
World Record	Total	Hossein Rezazadeh (IRI)	472 kg	Sydney, Australia	26 September 2000

== Results ==
Rank	Athlete	Group	Body weight	Snatch (kg)				Clean & Jerk (kg)				Total
Rank	Athlete	Group	Body weight	1	2	3	Rank	1	2	3	Rank	Total
1st place, gold medalist(s)	Viktors Ščerbatihs (LAT)	A	141.53	~~197~~	197	202	1st place, gold medalist(s)	240	~~247~~	—	3rd place, bronze medalist(s)	442
2nd place, silver medalist(s)	Evgeny Chigishev (RUS)	A	123.77	201	~~206~~	~~206~~	2nd place, silver medalist(s)	240	~~250~~	~~250~~	1st place, gold medalist(s)	441
3rd place, bronze medalist(s)	Jaber Saeed Salem (QAT)	A	124.60	~~195~~	195	~~200~~	4	231	240	~~243~~	2nd place, silver medalist(s)	435
4	Velichko Cholakov (BUL)	A	165.35	192	~~198~~	201	3rd place, bronze medalist(s)	225	234	~~237~~	4	435
5	Artem Udachyn (UKR)	A	148.77	195	~~200~~	~~200~~	6	232	~~241~~	~~241~~	5	427
6	Dimitrios Papageridis (GRE)	A	136.58	190	195	~~198~~	5	225	~~231~~	231	6	426
7	Grzegorz Kleszcz (POL)	A	128.70	185	~~190~~	190	7	230	~~237~~	~~238~~	7	420
8	Rashid Sharifi (IRI)	A	139.31	180	~~188~~	~~188~~	13	220	230	~~235~~	8	410
9	Mohammad Salehi (IRI)	A	134.51	175	183	~~190~~	9	215	225	~~231~~	9	408
10	Mohamed Ihsan (EGY)	A	147.74	175	183	~~190~~	10	225	~~233~~	~~235~~	10	408
11	Casey Burgener (USA)	B	122.29	170	177	182	11	210	218	~~225~~	12	400
12	Almir Velagić (GER)	A	130.34	~~176~~	176	180	12	~~217~~	217	~~223~~	13	397
13	Ihor Shymechko (UKR)	A	127.76	181	186	~~190~~	8	~~210~~	210	~~215~~	15	396
14	Ruben Aleksanyan (ARM)	B	128.41	165	170	175	15	207	218	220	11	395
15	Mohammad Ali (SYR)	B	112.89	~~160~~	160	165	21	211	~~220~~	~~220~~	14	376
16	Petr Sobotka (CZE)	B	152.38	166	~~170~~	170	19	204	~~209~~	~~210~~	21	374
17	Antti Everi (FIN)	B	130.12	~~167~~	~~167~~	167	20	195	~~204~~	204	20	371
18	Sarabjit Singh (IND)	C	137.48	155	160	165	22	~~195~~	195	206	18	371
19	Zach Schluender (USA)	C	121.62	160	165	170	17	195	200	~~206~~	22	370
20	Itte Detenamo (NRU)	B	148.61	160	165	170	18	~~200~~	200	~~205~~	24	370
21	Petr Hejda (CZE)	B	122.10	163	~~168~~	~~168~~	24	205	~~210~~	~~211~~	19	368
22	Yoel Morales (VEN)	B	118.84	153	158	160	25	207	~~210~~	~~210~~	16	367
23	Andrey Martemyanov (UZB)	B	146.32	150	~~160~~	160	26	~~205~~	~~206~~	207	17	367
24	Kazuomi Ota (JPN)	B	144.35	~~160~~	160	165	23	190	200	~~204~~	23	365
25	Chen Shih-chieh (TPE)	C	114.31	145	~~152~~	152	27	185	~~191~~	191	25	343
26	Michal Pokusa (SVK)	C	120.90	145	150	~~156~~	30	180	186	~~190~~	28	336
27	Döwran Orazdurdyýew (TKM)	C	106.91	~~150~~	~~150~~	150	28	185	~~190~~	~~190~~	29	335
28	Andrea Rovatti (ITA)	C	111.14	~~145~~	145	150	29	177	185	~~190~~	30	335
29	Huang Te-feng (TPE)	C	113.49	145	~~152~~	~~152~~	32	180	190	~~195~~	26	335
30	Dedi Apriyanto (INA)	C	145.50	~~145~~	145	150	31	185	~~191~~	~~191~~	32	335
31	Ondrej Kružel (SVK)	C	118.74	~~145~~	145	~~152~~	34	177	182	187	27	332
32	Sam Pera (COK)	C	113.81	140	145	~~150~~	33	170	180	185	31	330
33	Khalid Al-Shammari (QAT)	C	145.81	130	135	140	35	170	180	—	33	320
34	William Ainslie (RSA)	C	125.77	~~135~~	135	~~140~~	36	170	~~175~~	~~175~~	34	305
35	Feroz Mahmud (BAN)	C	123.21	~~110~~	110	115	38	135	145	~~151~~	35	260
36	Phạm Văn Cường (VIE)	C	112.26	110	~~115~~	115	37	140	~~145~~	~~145~~	36	255
—	Jeon Sang-guen (KOR)	A	157.14	~~180~~	180	~~190~~	14	~~241~~	~~241~~	~~250~~	—	—
—	Péter Nagy (HUN)	B	133.30	162	170	173	16	~~198~~	~~198~~	~~198~~	—	—
DQ	Haidar Dakhil (IRQ)	B	135.12	170	~~177~~	177	—	~~200~~	~~205~~	~~205~~	—	—
