= Weightlifting at the 2000 Summer Olympics – Men's +105 kg =

Weightlifting at the Olympics

Men's +105 kg at the Games of the XXVII Olympiad
- Venue: Sydney Convention and Exhibition Centre
- Date: 26 September 2000
- Competitors: 24 from 21 nations

Medalists
1st place, gold medalist(s)		Hossein Rezazadeh	Iran
2nd place, silver medalist(s)		Ronny Weller	Germany
3rd place, bronze medalist(s)		Andrey Chemerkin	Russia

The men's +105 kilograms weightlifting event at the 2000 Summer Olympics in Sydney, Australia took place at the Sydney Convention and Exhibition Centre on September 26.

Total score was the sum of the lifter's best result in each of the snatch and the clean and jerk, with three lifts allowed for each lift. In case of a tie, the lighter lifter won; if still tied, the lifter who took the fewest attempts to achieve the total score won. Lifters without a valid snatch score did not perform the clean and jerk.

== Schedule ==
All times are Australian Eastern Time (UTC+10:00)

Date	Time	Event
26 September 2000	14:30	Group B
26 September 2000	18:30	Group A

== Records ==
{{{caption}}}
World Record	Snatch	Hossein Rezazadeh (IRI)	206.0 kg	Athens, Greece	28 November 1999
World Record	Clean & Jerk	World Standard	262.5 kg	—	1 January 1998
World Record	Total	Ronny Weller (GER)	465.0 kg	Riesa, Germany	3 May 1998
Olympic Record	Snatch	Olympic Standard	202.5 kg	—	1 January 1997
Olympic Record	Clean & Jerk	Olympic Standard	260.0 kg	—	1 January 1997
Olympic Record	Total	Olympic Standard	460.0 kg	—	1 January 1997

== Results ==
Rank	Athlete	Group	Body weight	Snatch (kg)				Clean & Jerk (kg)				Total
Rank	Athlete	Group	Body weight	1	2	3	Result	1	2	3	Result	Total
1st place, gold medalist(s)	Hossein Rezazadeh (IRI)	A	147.48	205.0	~~210.0~~	212.5	212.5	250.0	255.0	260.0	260.0	472.5
2nd place, silver medalist(s)	Ronny Weller (GER)	A	146.88	200.0	~~207.5~~	210.0	210.0	250.0	257.5	~~262.5~~	257.5	467.5
3rd place, bronze medalist(s)	Andrey Chemerkin (RUS)	A	174.84	190.0	200.0	202.5	202.5	250.0	260.0	~~272.5~~	260.0	462.5
4	Jaber Saeed Salem (QAT)	A	123.64	200.0	205.0	~~210.0~~	205.0	250.0	255.0	~~260.0~~	255.0	460.0
5	Kim Tae-hyun (KOR)	A	133.36	~~195.0~~	195.0	200.0	200.0	245.0	260.0	~~265.0~~	260.0	460.0
6	Viktors Ščerbatihs (LAT)	A	131.58	197.5	~~202.5~~	202.5	202.5	242.5	250.0	~~257.5~~	250.0	452.5
7	Paweł Najdek (POL)	A	134.64	180.0	~~185.0~~	185.0	185.0	240.0	~~245.0~~	~~250.0~~	240.0	425.0
8	Tibor Stark (HUN)	B	140.62	180.0	190.0	195.0	195.0	220.0	230.0	—	230.0	425.0
9	Hennadiy Krasylnykov (UKR)	A	118.02	190.0	~~197.5~~	~~197.5~~	190.0	230.0	~~240.0~~	—	230.0	420.0
10	Shane Hamman (USA)	B	163.22	185.0	190.0	195.0	195.0	225.0	~~232.5~~	~~232.5~~	225.0	420.0
11	Artem Udachyn (UKR)	A	133.32	185.0	190.0	195.0	195.0	~~220.0~~	220.0	~~230.0~~	220.0	415.0
12	Igor Khalilov (UZB)	B	140.12	185.0	~~190.0~~	~~190.0~~	185.0	225.0	~~235.0~~	—	225.0	410.0
13	Jon Tecedor (ESP)	B	138.34	170.0	175.0	~~180.0~~	175.0	210.0	215.0	220.0	220.0	395.0
14	Petr Sobotka (CZE)	B	155.06	170.0	175.0	~~180.0~~	175.0	210.0	215.0	217.5	217.5	392.5
15	Marius Alecu (ROM)	B	116.04	165.0	170.0	175.0	175.0	215.0	~~220.0~~	~~220.0~~	215.0	390.0
16	Valeri Sarava (GEO)	B	115.54	~~170.0~~	170.0	~~177.5~~	170.0	210.0	215.0	~~220.0~~	215.0	385.0
17	Nigel Avery (NZL)	B	121.98	162.5	167.5	172.5	172.5	200.0	205.0	210.0	210.0	382.5
18	Anthony Martin (AUS)	B	144.34	157.5	~~162.5~~	162.5	162.5	200.0	207.5	~~215.0~~	207.5	370.0
19	Chris Rae (AUS)	B	132.02	155.0	~~160.0~~	~~160.0~~	155.0	195.0	205.0	~~212.5~~	205.0	360.0
20	Alesana Sione (ASA)	B	130.18	~~160.0~~	160.0	~~167.5~~	160.0	190.0	~~197.5~~	197.5	197.5	357.5
21	Plaiter Reyes (DOM)	B	137.00	157.5	~~162.5~~	~~162.5~~	157.5	195.0	—	—	195.0	352.5
—	Hisaya Yoshimoto (JPN)	B	112.40	170.0	180.0	~~182.5~~	180.0	—	—	—	—	—
—	Raimonds Bergmanis (LAT)	B	137.58	~~180.0~~	—	—	—	—	—	—	—	—
DQ	Ashot Danielyan (ARM)	A	160.62	200.0	~~205.0~~	207.5	207.5	250.0	257.5	~~262.5~~	257.5	~~465.0~~

- Armenia's Ashot Danielyan originally won the bronze medal, but was disqualified after he tested positive for stanozolol.

== New records ==
Snatch	205.0 kg	Hossein Rezazadeh (IRI)	OR
Snatch	~~207.5 kg~~	~~Ashot Danielyan (ARM)~~	~~WR~~
Snatch	210.0 kg	Ronny Weller (GER)	WR
Snatch	212.5 kg	Hossein Rezazadeh (IRI)	WR
Total	462.5 kg	Hossein Rezazadeh (IRI)	OR
Total	467.5 kg	Hossein Rezazadeh (IRI)	WR
Total	472.5 kg	Hossein Rezazadeh (IRI)	WR
