= 2005 World Weightlifting Championships – Men's +105 kg =

The 2005 World Weightlifting Championships were held in Doha, Qatar from 9 November to 17 November. The men's +105 kilograms division was staged on 17 November 2005.

== Schedule ==
| Date | Time | Event |
|---|---|---|
| 17 November 2005 | 13:00 | Group B |
| 17 November 2005 | 15:00 | Group A |

== Medalists ==
| Event | Gold | | Silver | | Bronze | |
|---|---|---|---|---|---|---|
| Snatch | Evgeny Chigishev (RUS) | 211 kg | Hossein Rezazadeh (IRI) | 210 kg | Jaber Saeed Salem (QAT) | 201 kg |
| Clean & Jerk | Hossein Rezazadeh (IRI) | 251 kg | Evgeny Chigishev (RUS) | 246 kg | Jaber Saeed Salem (QAT) | 245 kg |
| Total | Hossein Rezazadeh (IRI) | 461 kg | Evgeny Chigishev (RUS) | 457 kg | Jaber Saeed Salem (QAT) | 446 kg |

== Records ==
Prior to this competition, the existing world records were as follows.

| World Record | Snatch | Hossein Rezazadeh (IRI) | 213 kg | Qinhuangdao, China | 14 September 2003 |
| World Record | Clean & Jerk | Hossein Rezazadeh (IRI) | 263 kg | Athens, Greece | 25 August 2004 |
| World Record | Total | Hossein Rezazadeh (IRI) | 472 kg | Sydney, Australia | 26 September 2000 |

== Results ==
| Rank | Athlete | Group | Body weight | Snatch (kg) | | | | Clean & Jerk (kg) | | | | Total |
| Rank | Athlete | Group | Body weight | 1 | 2 | 3 | Rank | 1 | 2 | 3 | Rank | Total |
|---|---|---|---|---|---|---|---|---|---|---|---|---|
| 1st place, gold medalist(s) | Hossein Rezazadeh (IRI) | A | 164.60 | 201 | 205 | 210 | 2nd place, silver medalist(s) | 251 | ~~263~~ | ~~263~~ | 1st place, gold medalist(s) | 461 |
| 2nd place, silver medalist(s) | Evgeny Chigishev (RUS) | A | 125.77 | 200 | 209 | 211 | 1st place, gold medalist(s) | 240 | 246 | ~~251~~ | 2nd place, silver medalist(s) | 457 |
| 3rd place, bronze medalist(s) | Jaber Saeed Salem (QAT) | A | 125.30 | 195 | 201 | ~~203~~ | 3rd place, bronze medalist(s) | 240 | 245 | — | 3rd place, bronze medalist(s) | 446 |
| 4 | Viktors Ščerbatihs (LAT) | A | 139.55 | 195 | 201 | ~~205~~ | 4 | ~~242~~ | 243 | ~~250~~ | 4 | 444 |
| 5 | Mohamed Ihsan (EGY) | A | 148.56 | ~~186~~ | ~~190~~ | 190 | 6 | 230 | 238 | ~~242~~ | 6 | 428 |
| 6 | Ashot Danielyan (ARM) | A | 167.45 | ~~193~~ | 193 | 196 | 5 | 232 | ~~241~~ | — | 8 | 428 |
| 7 | Paweł Najdek (POL) | A | 138.74 | 182 | 187 | ~~190~~ | 7 | 233 | 238 | ~~245~~ | 5 | 425 |
| 8 | Vladimir Glushko (RUS) | A | 145.35 | ~~187~~ | 187 | ~~192~~ | 8 | 237 | ~~245~~ | ~~245~~ | 7 | 424 |
| 9 | Oleksiy Kolokoltsev (UKR) | A | 121.99 | 185 | ~~189~~ | ~~189~~ | 9 | 226 | ~~235~~ | ~~235~~ | 9 | 411 |
| 10 | Dimitrios Papageridis (GRE) | B | 136.73 | 180 | 185 | ~~187~~ | 10 | 220 | 226 | ~~233~~ | 10 | 411 |
| 11 | Almir Velagić (GER) | B | 123.81 | 172 | 177 | 180 | 11 | 208 | 215 | 220 | 11 | 400 |
| 12 | Siarhei Karasiou (BLR) | B | 127.11 | ~~180~~ | ~~180~~ | 180 | 12 | 215 | ~~225~~ | ~~225~~ | 13 | 395 |
| 13 | Petr Sobotka (CZE) | B | 159.54 | ~~177~~ | 177 | ~~181~~ | 13 | ~~215~~ | 215 | ~~224~~ | 14 | 392 |
| 14 | Casey Burgener (USA) | B | 117.45 | 167 | 172 | 175 | 14 | 210 | 215 | ~~220~~ | 12 | 390 |
| 15 | Hildegar Morillo (VEN) | B | 143.84 | 152 | ~~160~~ | ~~160~~ | 15 | 203 | ~~211~~ | ~~211~~ | 15 | 355 |
| 16 | Khalid Al-Shammari (QAT) | B | 137.91 | 110 | ~~115~~ | 117 | 16 | 140 | 145 | 150 | 16 | 267 |
