= 1999 World Weightlifting Championships – Men's +105 kg =

The Men's Super Heavyweight Weightlifting Event (+105 kg) is the heaviest men's weight class event at the weightlifting competition, open to competitors over 105 kilograms of body mass. The competition at the 1999 World Weightlifting Championships took place in Athens, Greece.

Each lifter performed in both the snatch and clean and jerk lifts, with the final score being the sum of the lifter's best result in each. The athlete received three attempts in each of the two lifts; the score for the lift was the heaviest weight successfully lifted.

== Medalists ==
| Event | Gold | | Silver | | Bronze | |
|---|---|---|---|---|---|---|
| Snatch | Jaber Saeed Salem (QAT) | 205.0 kg | Hossein Rezazadeh (IRI) | 205.0 kg | Viktors Ščerbatihs (LAT) | 200.0 kg |
| Clean & Jerk | Andrey Chemerkin (RUS) | 257.5 kg | Kim Tae-hyun (KOR) | 252.5 kg | Jaber Saeed Salem (QAT) | 250.0 kg |
| Total | Andrey Chemerkin (RUS) | 457.5 kg | Jaber Saeed Salem (QAT) | 455.0 kg | Hossein Rezazadeh (IRI) | 447.5 kg |

== Records ==
Prior to this competition, the existing world records were as follows.

| World record | Snatch | Ronny Weller (GER) | 205.5 kg | Riesa, Germany | 3 May 1998 |
| World record | Clean & jerk | World Standard | 262.5 kg | — | 1 January 1998 |
| World record | Total | Ronny Weller (GER) | 465.0 kg | Riesa, Germany | 3 May 1998 |

== Results ==
| Rank | Athlete | Body weight | Snatch (kg) | | | | Clean & Jerk (kg) | | | | Total |
| Rank | Athlete | Body weight | 1 | 2 | 3 | Rank | 1 | 2 | 3 | Rank | Total |
|---|---|---|---|---|---|---|---|---|---|---|---|
| 1st place, gold medalist(s) | Andrey Chemerkin (RUS) | 181.72 | 195.0 | 200.0 | ~~202.5~~ | 5 | 245.0 | ~~257.5~~ | 257.5 | 1st place, gold medalist(s) | 457.5 |
| 2nd place, silver medalist(s) | Jaber Saeed Salem (QAT) | 118.86 | 190.0 | 200.0 | 205.0 | 1st place, gold medalist(s) | 240.0 | ~~250.0~~ | 250.0 | 3rd place, bronze medalist(s) | 455.0 |
| 3rd place, bronze medalist(s) | Hossein Rezazadeh (IRI) | 146.95 | ~~200.0~~ | 200.0 | 206.0 | 2nd place, silver medalist(s) | 242.5 | ~~252.5~~ | ~~252.5~~ | 5 | 447.5 |
| 4 | Kim Tae-hyun (KOR) | 133.63 | 190.0 | ~~200.0~~ | ~~200.0~~ | 10 | ~~250.0~~ | 250.0 | 252.5 | 2nd place, silver medalist(s) | 442.5 |
| 5 | Hennadiy Krasylnykov (UKR) | 118.40 | 192.5 | ~~197.5~~ | 197.5 | 6 | 230.0 | 237.5 | 242.5 | 4 | 440.0 |
| 6 | Viktors Ščerbatihs (LAT) | 135.90 | 195.0 | ~~200.0~~ | 200.0 | 3rd place, bronze medalist(s) | ~~240.0~~ | 240.0 | ~~250.0~~ | 6 | 440.0 |
| 7 | Stian Grimseth (NOR) | 155.09 | ~~190.0~~ | 195.0 | ~~200.0~~ | 9 | ~~230.0~~ | 230.0 | 235.0 | 10 | 430.0 |
| 8 | Sergey Flerko (RUS) | 128.44 | 187.5 | 192.5 | 195.0 | 7 | 232.5 | ~~240.0~~ | ~~240.0~~ | 12 | 427.5 |
| 9 | Artem Udachyn (UKR) | 130.56 | 185.0 | 190.0 | 195.0 | 8 | 220.0 | 230.0 | ~~235.0~~ | 14 | 425.0 |
| 10 | Ruslan Doroshuk (BLR) | 131.27 | 175.0 | 182.5 | 187.5 | 13 | 220.0 | 230.0 | 235.0 | 9 | 422.5 |
| 11 | Axel Franz (GER) | 140.82 | 180.0 | 185.0 | 190.0 | 11 | 220.0 | 227.5 | 232.5 | 13 | 422.5 |
| 12 | Tibor Stark (HUN) | 144.36 | 180.0 | 185.0 | 190.0 | 12 | 220.0 | 227.5 | — | 16 | 417.5 |
| 13 | Igor Khalilov (UZB) | 136.35 | ~~180.0~~ | 180.0 | 185.0 | 14 | 220.0 | 230.0 | ~~235.0~~ | 15 | 415.0 |
| 14 | Paweł Najdek (POL) | 127.34 | 172.5 | 177.5 | ~~180.0~~ | 18 | 225.0 | 232.5 | ~~237.5~~ | 11 | 410.0 |
| 15 | Shane Hamman (USA) | 159.10 | 180.0 | 185.0 | ~~190.0~~ | 15 | 220.0 | ~~225.0~~ | ~~225.0~~ | 19 | 405.0 |
| 16 | Mariusz Jędra (POL) | 111.51 | 170.0 | 175.0 | ~~180.0~~ | 19 | 217.5 | 222.5 | 225.0 | 17 | 400.0 |
| 17 | Jon Tecedor (ESP) | 135.52 | 170.0 | 175.0 | 180.0 | 17 | 210.0 | 220.0 | ~~222.5~~ | 18 | 400.0 |
| 18 | Raimonds Bergmanis (LAT) | 134.63 | ~~175.0~~ | 175.0 | 180.0 | 16 | 217.5 | ~~225.0~~ | ~~225.0~~ | 21 | 397.5 |
| 19 | Bruno Soto (ESP) | 148.59 | 160.0 | 165.0 | 170.0 | 21 | 205.0 | 215.0 | ~~222.5~~ | 22 | 385.0 |
| 20 | Mika Reijonen (FIN) | 108.68 | 160.0 | ~~165.0~~ | 165.0 | 26 | 205.0 | 212.5 | 217.5 | 20 | 382.5 |
| 21 | Giorgi Kobaladze (GEO) | 107.98 | 160.0 | 165.0 | 167.5 | 22 | 200.0 | 205.0 | 210.0 | 23 | 377.5 |
| 22 | Giles Greenwood (GBR) | 121.95 | ~~160.0~~ | ~~165.0~~ | 172.5 | 20 | 200.0 | ~~207.5~~ | ~~207.5~~ | 30 | 372.5 |
| 23 | Apolosio Tokotuu (FRA) | 114.02 | 162.5 | 167.5 | ~~170.0~~ | 23 | 195.0 | 202.5 | ~~207.5~~ | 26 | 370.0 |
| 24 | Hany Mahmoud (EGY) | 119.58 | 155.0 | ~~162.5~~ | 162.5 | 28 | 195.0 | 202.5 | 207.5 | 24 | 370.0 |
| 25 | Dalbir Singh (IND) | 122.31 | 160.0 | 167.5 | ~~172.5~~ | 25 | 190.0 | 202.5 | ~~205.0~~ | 27 | 370.0 |
| 26 | Nigel Avery (NZL) | 114.55 | 157.5 | 162.5 | 167.5 | 24 | ~~192.5~~ | 192.5 | 197.5 | 31 | 365.0 |
| 27 | Hassanain Sheikh (SYR) | 109.62 | 155.0 | 160.0 | ~~162.5~~ | 29 | 195.0 | 200.0 | ~~205.0~~ | 29 | 360.0 |
| 28 | Vitalijus Undraitis (LTU) | 107.42 | 155.0 | ~~160.0~~ | ~~162.5~~ | 33 | ~~195.0~~ | 195.0 | 200.0 | 28 | 355.0 |
| 29 | Aleko Nozadze (GEO) | 110.25 | ~~157.5~~ | 157.5 | 162.5 | 27 | 192.5 | ~~197.5~~ | ~~200.0~~ | 34 | 355.0 |
| 30 | Edries González (PUR) | 138.89 | 152.5 | 160.0 | ~~162.5~~ | 30 | 187.5 | ~~192.5~~ | 195.0 | 33 | 355.0 |
| 31 | Ernesto Montoya (CUB) | 109.72 | 150.0 | 155.0 | 157.5 | 31 | 195.0 | ~~200.0~~ | — | 32 | 352.5 |
| 32 | Harald Steiner (AUT) | 128.06 | ~~155.0~~ | ~~155.0~~ | 155.0 | 34 | 192.5 | ~~197.5~~ | ~~197.5~~ | 35 | 347.5 |
| 33 | Jan Mušinský (CZE) | 144.62 | 152.5 | 157.5 | ~~160.0~~ | 32 | 190.0 | ~~195.0~~ | ~~195.0~~ | 37 | 347.5 |
| 34 | Gurbinder Singh Cheema (GBR) | 108.11 | 145.0 | ~~150.0~~ | 150.0 | 35 | 185.0 | ~~190.0~~ | 190.0 | 36 | 340.0 |
| 35 | Haidar Dakhil (IRQ) | 118.91 | 142.5 | 150.0 | ~~155.0~~ | 36 | 170.0 | 180.0 | — | 39 | 330.0 |
| 36 | Ali Benmedjghaia (ALG) | 126.52 | 140.0 | 150.0 | ~~160.0~~ | 37 | 180.0 | ~~185.0~~ | — | 40 | 330.0 |
| 37 | Saulius Brusokas (LTU) | 118.59 | ~~140.0~~ | 140.0 | ~~145.0~~ | 40 | 180.0 | ~~185.0~~ | ~~187.5~~ | 38 | 320.0 |
| 38 | Sharlon Hellement (NED) | 120.30 | ~~135.0~~ | 135.0 | 140.0 | 41 | 175.0 | ~~182.5~~ | ~~182.5~~ | 41 | 315.0 |
| 39 | Bo Hegnsborg (DEN) | 109.18 | 137.5 | 142.5 | ~~145.0~~ | 39 | 170.0 | ~~177.5~~ | ~~177.5~~ | 42 | 312.5 |
| 40 | Roy Duckers (NED) | 118.46 | 115.0 | 120.0 | 125.0 | 42 | 140.0 | 147.5 | ~~157.5~~ | 43 | 272.5 |
| — | Ara Vardanyan (ARM) | 137.14 | 195.0 | 200.0 | ~~205.0~~ | 4 | ~~230.0~~ | — | — | — | — |
| — | Mikko Viitala (FIN) | 119.61 | ~~145.0~~ | 145.0 | ~~152.5~~ | 38 | ~~185.0~~ | ~~185.0~~ | ~~187.5~~ | — | — |
| — | Ronny Weller (GER) | 147.49 | ~~200.0~~ | ~~200.0~~ | ~~200.0~~ | — | 232.5 | 240.0 | — | 7 | — |
| — | Ashot Danielyan (ARM) | 162.55 | ~~197.5~~ | ~~200.0~~ | ~~202.5~~ | — | 240.0 | ~~252.5~~ | ~~252.5~~ | 8 | — |
| — | Hironobu Asada (JPN) | 115.32 | ~~170.0~~ | ~~170.0~~ | ~~170.0~~ | — | 205.0 | ~~210.0~~ | ~~210.0~~ | 25 | — |
| — | Henrik Kaus (DEN) | 116.14 | ~~145.0~~ | ~~145.0~~ | ~~145.0~~ | — | ~~170.0~~ | ~~170.0~~ | ~~170.0~~ | — | — |
| — | Markus Marksteiner (AUT) | 126.49 | — | — | — | — | — | — | — | — | — |
| DQ | Ruslan Mehmedov (AZE) | 131.81 | ~~155.0~~ | ~~160.0~~ | ~~160.0~~ | — | 187.5 | ~~195.0~~ | ~~195.0~~ | — | — |

== New records ==
| Snatch | 206.0 kg | Hossein Rezazadeh (IRI) | WR |
