= 2006 World Weightlifting Championships – Men's +105 kg =

The 2006 World Weightlifting Championships were held in Santo Domingo, Dominican Republic from 30 September to 7 October. The men's +105 kilograms division was staged on 6 and 7 October 2006. Hossein Rezazadeh from Iran won the gold medal, Ukraine's Artem Udachyn got the silver and China's Dong Feng won the bronze medal.

== Schedule ==
Date	Time	Event
6 October 2006	16:00	Group C
6 October 2006	20:00	Group B
7 October 2006	14:00	Group A

== Medalists ==
Event	Gold		Silver		Bronze	
Snatch	Hossein Rezazadeh (IRI)	202 kg	Artem Udachyn (UKR)	199 kg	Viktors Ščerbatihs (LAT)	198 kg
Clean & Jerk	Hossein Rezazadeh (IRI)	246 kg	Dong Feng (CHN)	245 kg	Mohamed Ihsan (EGY)	241 kg
Total	Hossein Rezazadeh (IRI)	448 kg	Artem Udachyn (UKR)	439 kg	Dong Feng (CHN)	437 kg

== Records ==
Prior to this competition, the existing world records were as follows.

World Record	Snatch	Hossein Rezazadeh (IRI)	213 kg	Qinhuangdao, China	14 September 2003
World Record	Clean & Jerk	Hossein Rezazadeh (IRI)	263 kg	Athens, Greece	25 August 2004
World Record	Total	Hossein Rezazadeh (IRI)	472 kg	Sydney, Australia	26 September 2000

== Results ==
Rank	Athlete	Group	Body weight	Snatch (kg)				Clean & Jerk (kg)				Total
Rank	Athlete	Group	Body weight	1	2	3	Rank	1	2	3	Rank	Total
1st place, gold medalist(s)	Hossein Rezazadeh (IRI)	A	162.87	196	202	~~206~~	1st place, gold medalist(s)	242	246	—	1st place, gold medalist(s)	448
2nd place, silver medalist(s)	Artem Udachyn (UKR)	A	142.04	195	199	~~205~~	2nd place, silver medalist(s)	235	240	~~245~~	4	439
3rd place, bronze medalist(s)	Dong Feng (CHN)	A	134.28	185	192	~~198~~	4	235	245	~~251~~	2nd place, silver medalist(s)	437
4	Viktors Ščerbatihs (LAT)	A	141.67	192	198	~~200~~	3rd place, bronze medalist(s)	~~236~~	236	~~245~~	5	434
5	Grzegorz Kleszcz (POL)	A	121.29	180	~~185~~	~~185~~	6	225	~~229~~	~~230~~	7	405
6	Dimitrios Papageridis (GRE)	A	137.10	178	182	~~188~~	5	216	222	~~227~~	8	404
7	Song Young-hoon (KOR)	A	136.28	165	170	~~175~~	12	215	226	~~236~~	6	396
8	Almir Velagić (GER)	A	127.64	170	175	~~178~~	10	210	216	220	9	395
9	Arkadiusz Białek (POL)	A	107.34	175	~~180~~	~~182~~	8	210	215	~~217~~	10	390
10	Casey Burgener (USA)	B	120.38	170	~~175~~	175	9	210	215	~~221~~	12	390
11	William Solís (COL)	B	119.08	~~160~~	160	165	17	~~205~~	205	215	11	380
12	Ihor Shymechko (UKR)	B	122.89	180	~~185~~	~~185~~	7	~~200~~	200	~~205~~	18	380
13	Petr Sobotka (CZE)	B	159.09	170	~~175~~	~~175~~	13	210	~~220~~	—	13	380
14	Libor Wälzer (CZE)	B	109.25	160	165	170	11	196	200	~~203~~	16	370
15	Itte Detenamo (NRU)	C	145.38	158	163	167	16	~~200~~	200	203	14	370
16	Cristián Escalante (CHI)	C	121.04	160	~~167~~	167	14	~~195~~	195	202	15	369
17	Péter Nagy (HUN)	B	133.07	161	167	~~172~~	15	195	~~203~~	~~203~~	21	362
18	Víctor Heredia (VEN)	B	122.74	160	~~165~~	~~165~~	18	200	~~207~~	~~208~~	17	360
19	Julio Arteaga (ECU)	B	126.61	150	~~155~~	155	19	~~200~~	200	~~205~~	19	355
20	Damon Kelly (AUS)	C	149.50	146	152	~~158~~	22	190	200	~~205~~	20	352
21	Modestas Šimkus (LTU)	B	105.19	153	~~160~~	~~160~~	21	192	~~200~~	~~200~~	22	345
—	Mohamed Ihsan (EGY)	A	147.14	~~190~~	~~190~~	~~190~~	—	241	~~246~~	~~247~~	3rd place, bronze medalist(s)	—
—	Saša Čegar (CRO)	B	107.32	~~151~~	~~151~~	~~151~~	—	—	—	—	—	—
—	Francisco Guillén (DOM)	C	179.88	~~150~~	150	155	20	~~180~~	~~180~~	—	—	—
—	Velichko Cholakov (BUL)	A	159.80	~~185~~	~~185~~	~~185~~	—	—	—	—	—	—
DQ	Jim Gyllenhammar (SWE)	B	124.57	~~168~~	168	~~173~~	—	~~210~~	~~210~~	~~210~~	—	—
