= 1998 World Weightlifting Championships – Men's +105 kg =

The 1998 World Weightlifting Championships were held in Lahti, Finland from November 7 to November 15. The men's competition in the super heavyweight division (+105 kg) was staged on 15 November 1998. The defending champion was Andrey Chemerkin from Russia, who won the title in the men's +108 kg division a year earlier at the 1997 World Championships in Chiang Mai, Thailand.

== Medalists ==
Event	Gold		Silver		Bronze	
Snatch	Ara Vardanyan (ARM)	197.5 kg	Andrey Chemerkin (RUS)	197.5 kg	Viktors Ščerbatihs (LAT)	195.0 kg
Clean & Jerk	Andrey Chemerkin (RUS)	240.0 kg	Paweł Najdek (POL)	232.5 kg	Ara Vardanyan (ARM)	230.0 kg
Total	Andrey Chemerkin (RUS)	437.5 kg	Ara Vardanyan (ARM)	427.5 kg	Viktors Ščerbatihs (LAT)	422.5 kg

== Records ==
Prior to this competition, the existing world records were as follows.

World Record	Snatch	Ronny Weller (GER)	205.5 kg	Riesa, Germany	3 May 1998
World Record	Clean & Jerk	World Standard	262.5 kg	—	1 January 1998
World Record	Total	Ronny Weller (GER)	465.0 kg	Riesa, Germany	3 May 1998

== Results ==
Rank	Athlete	Body weight	Snatch (kg)				Clean & Jerk (kg)				Total
Rank	Athlete	Body weight	1	2	3	Rank	1	2	3	Rank	Total
1st place, gold medalist(s)	Andrey Chemerkin (RUS)	177.61	190.0	197.5	~~206.0~~	2nd place, silver medalist(s)	~~240.0~~	240.0	—	1st place, gold medalist(s)	437.5
2nd place, silver medalist(s)	Ara Vardanyan (ARM)	127.55	190.0	195.0	197.5	1st place, gold medalist(s)	230.0	~~237.5~~	—	3rd place, bronze medalist(s)	427.5
3rd place, bronze medalist(s)	Viktors Ščerbatihs (LAT)	126.28	185.0	190.0	195.0	3rd place, bronze medalist(s)	227.5	~~235.0~~	~~235.0~~	4	422.5
4	Paweł Najdek (POL)	125.66	170.0	175.0	~~180.0~~	7	225.0	~~232.5~~	232.5	2nd place, silver medalist(s)	407.5
5	Alekos Panatidis (GRE)	124.95	170.0	175.0	180.0	6	~~225.0~~	225.0	~~232.5~~	5	405.0
6	Andre Rohde (GER)	105.27	165.0	170.0	172.5	8	205.0	210.0	215.0	6	387.5
7	Jon Tecedor (ESP)	130.11	165.0	~~170.0~~	170.0	9	210.0	215.0	~~220.0~~	7	385.0
8	Bruno Soto (ESP)	147.83	160.0	165.0	~~170.0~~	10	205.0	~~212.5~~	212.5	8	377.5
9	Darren Liddel (NZL)	137.26	~~155.0~~	155.0	~~160.0~~	14	190.0	200.0	207.5	9	362.5
10	Tadayuki Higuchi (JPN)	141.42	155.0	160.0	~~165.0~~	12	190.0	200.0	202.5	10	362.5
11	Hany Mahmoud (EGY)	111.35	155.0	~~160.0~~	160.0	11	190.0	195.0	200.0	11	360.0
12	Ma Chang-hung (TPE)	131.02	145.0	150.0	152.5	16	190.0	~~195.0~~	195.0	12	347.5
13	Georges Wadja (CMR)	109.09	~~155.0~~	155.0	~~162.5~~	13	175.0	182.5	~~187.5~~	14	337.5
14	Djamel Aggdune (ALG)	105.47	145.0	152.5	~~155.0~~	15	170.0	177.5	182.5	13	335.0
15	Sigitas Sakalauskas (LTU)	113.40	135.0	~~142.5~~	142.5	17	180.0	~~190.0~~	~~190.0~~	15	322.5
16	Isca Kam (NRU)	126.07	135.0	~~142.5~~	~~142.5~~	18	172.5	—	—	16	307.5
17	Sharlon Hellement (NED)	111.35	115.0	120.0	125.0	19	155.0	162.5	167.5	17	292.5
—	Ashot Danielyan (ARM)	159.30	190.0	195.0	~~197.5~~	4	~~232.5~~	~~232.5~~	~~235.0~~	—	—
—	Ferenc Jakab-Tóth (HUN)	124.43	175.0	180.0	185.0	5	~~210.0~~	~~210.0~~	~~210.0~~	—	—
—	Anders Bergström (SWE)	132.40	~~172.5~~	~~172.5~~	~~172.5~~	—	—	—	—	—	—
