= 1997 World Weightlifting Championships – Men's +108 kg =

The 1997 World Weightlifting Championships were held in Chiang Mai, Thailand from December 6 to December 14. The men's competition in the +108 kg division was staged on 14 December 1997.

== Medalists ==
Event	Gold		Silver		Bronze	
Snatch	Ronny Weller (GER)	200.0 kg	Andrey Chemerkin (RUS)	200.0 kg	Viktors Ščerbatihs (LAT)	187.5 kg
Clean & Jerk	Andrey Chemerkin (RUS)	262.5 kg	Ronny Weller (GER)	250.0 kg	Viktors Ščerbatihs (LAT)	225.0 kg
Total	Andrey Chemerkin (RUS)	462.5 kg	Ronny Weller (GER)	450.0 kg	Viktors Ščerbatihs (LAT)	412.5 kg

== Records ==
Prior to this competition, the existing world records were as follows.

World record	Snatch	Aleksandr Kurlovich (BLR)	205.0 kg	Istanbul, Turkey	27 November 1994
World record	Clean & Jerk	Andrey Chemerkin (RUS)	260.0 kg	Atlanta, United States	30 July 1996
World record	Total	Andrey Chemerkin (RUS)	457.5 kg	Atlanta, United States	30 July 1996

== Results ==
Rank	Athlete	Body weight	Snatch (kg)				Clean & Jerk (kg)				Total
Rank	Athlete	Body weight	1	2	3	Rank	1	2	3	Rank	Total
1st place, gold medalist(s)	Andrey Chemerkin (RUS)	170.30	185.0	195.0	200.0	2nd place, silver medalist(s)	240.0	250.0	262.5	1st place, gold medalist(s)	462.5
2nd place, silver medalist(s)	Ronny Weller (GER)	138.40	195.0	200.0	~~205.5~~	1st place, gold medalist(s)	242.5	250.0	~~262.5~~	2nd place, silver medalist(s)	450.0
3rd place, bronze medalist(s)	Viktors Ščerbatihs (LAT)	118.45	182.5	187.5	~~190.0~~	3rd place, bronze medalist(s)	220.0	225.0	~~240.0~~	3rd place, bronze medalist(s)	412.5
4	Tibor Stark (HUN)	134.65	180.0	185.0	~~190.0~~	4	215.0	220.0	~~225.0~~	6	405.0
5	Anders Bergström (SWE)	130.20	~~175.0~~	175.0	~~180.0~~	6	220.0	225.0	~~232.5~~	4	400.0
6	Raimonds Bergmanis (LAT)	134.35	170.0	175.0	~~180.0~~	7	220.0	225.0	~~230.0~~	5	400.0
7	Stian Grimseth (NOR)	141.90	177.5	~~182.5~~	~~185.0~~	5	215.0	~~220.0~~	—	8	392.5
8	Sos Khachatryan (ARM)	141.55	170.0	175.0	~~177.5~~	8	205.0	~~215.0~~	215.0	7	390.0
9	Erdinç Arslan (TUR)	137.25	160.0	165.0	~~170.0~~	10	210.0	—	—	11	375.0
10	Bruno Soto (ESP)	140.00	162.5	~~167.5~~	~~167.5~~	12	205.0	~~212.5~~	212.5	9	375.0
11	Taher Mohammed (IRQ)	121.00	160.0	~~165.0~~	165.0	9	~~195.0~~	195.0	~~200.0~~	12	360.0
12	Petr Sobotka (CZE)	141.60	165.0	~~170.0~~	~~170.0~~	11	~~192.5~~	192.5	195.0	14	360.0
13	Ma Chan-hung (TPE)	133.25	140.0	~~147.5~~	~~147.5~~	14	190.0	195.0	~~200.0~~	13	335.0
14	Nopadol Wanwang (THA)	113.50	~~135.0~~	135.0	~~140.0~~	15	175.0	180.0	192.5	15	327.5
15	Isca Kam (NRU)	126.75	130.0	140.0	~~145.0~~	13	170.0	180.0	~~190.0~~	16	320.0
—	Sergey Siziev (RUS)	108.55	~~170.0~~	~~170.0~~	~~170.0~~	—	205.0	210.0	~~215.0~~	10	—
—	Friedrich Konrad (AUT)	109.55	~~160.0~~	~~160.0~~	~~160.0~~	—	~~195.0~~	~~195.0~~	~~195.0~~	—	—

== New records ==
Clean & Jerk	262.5 kg	Andrey Chemerkin (RUS)	WR
Total	462.5 kg	Andrey Chemerkin (RUS)	WR
