= Weightlifting at the 1998 Asian Games – Men's +105 kg =

Men's +105 kg at the 1998 Asian Games
- Venue: Thunder Dome
- Date: 14 December 1998
- Competitors: 14 from 11 nations

Medalists
gold medal	Kim Tae-hyun	South Korea
silver medal	Igor Khalilov	Uzbekistan
bronze medal	Hossein Rezazadeh	Iran

The men's +105 kilograms event at the 1998 Asian Games took place on 14 December 1998 at Thunder Dome, Maung Thong Thani Sports Complex.

The weightlifter from South Korea won the gold, with a combined lift of 427.5 kg.

Total score was the sum of the lifter's best result in each of the snatch and the clean and jerk, with three lifts allowed for each lift. In case of a tie, the lighter lifter won; if still tied, the lifter who took the fewest attempts to achieve the total score won. Lifters without a valid snatch score were allowed to perform the clean and jerk.

== Results ==
Legend

- NM — No mark

Rank	Athlete	Body weight	Snatch (kg)				Clean & Jerk (kg)				Total
Rank	Athlete	Body weight	1	2	3	Result	1	2	3	Result	Total
1st place, gold medalist(s)	Kim Tae-hyun (KOR)	126.20	185.0	190.0	195.0	195.0	232.5	~~245.0~~	—	232.5	427.5
2nd place, silver medalist(s)	Igor Khalilov (UZB)	130.35	175.0	182.5	187.5	187.5	210.0	220.0	232.5	232.5	420.0
3rd place, bronze medalist(s)	Hossein Rezazadeh (IRI)	141.55	~~180.0~~	180.0	187.5	187.5	220.0	228.0	~~235.0~~	227.5	415.0
4	Lee Woo-sung (KOR)	108.50	~~165.0~~	165.0	~~170.0~~	165.0	210.0	~~215.0~~	215.0	215.0	380.0
5	Aleksandr Urinov (UZB)	105.05	170.0	177.5	180.0	180.0	195.0	~~202.5~~	~~202.5~~	195.0	375.0
6	Hironobu Asada (JPN)	113.85	160.0	170.0	~~172.5~~	170.0	195.0	~~205.0~~	~~205.0~~	195.0	365.0
7	Nopadol Wanwang (THA)	121.75	150.0	155.0	~~160.0~~	155.0	195.0	200.0	~~205.0~~	200.0	355.0
8	Awad Al-Aboudi (JOR)	123.70	145.0	~~150.0~~	~~152.5~~	145.0	165.0	172.5	~~177.5~~	172.5	317.5
9	Alvin Delos Santos (PHI)	125.85	~~140.0~~	140.0	145.0	145.0	170.0	~~180.0~~	~~180.0~~	170.0	315.0
—	Nobuaki Aoki (JPN)	127.95	~~155.0~~	~~155.0~~	~~155.0~~	—	205.0	~~210.0~~	~~210.0~~	205.0	NM
—	Prodip Chandra Das (BAN)	106.30	~~110.0~~	~~110.0~~	~~110.0~~	—	140.0	~~145.0~~	145.0	145.0	NM
—	Sheikh Ali Mohammad (SYR)	113.20	~~160.0~~	~~160.0~~	~~160.0~~	—	—	—	—	—	NM
—	Ali Choukeir (LIB)	134.00	~~140.0~~	~~140.0~~	—	—	—	—	—	—	NM
DQ	Jaber Al-Ajmi (KUW)	167.30	110.0	120.0	125.0	125.0	135.0	145.0	~~150.0~~	145.0	~~270.0~~

- Jaber Al-Ajmi of Kuwait originally finished 10th, but was disqualified after he tested positive for nandrolone.
