= 2001 World Weightlifting Championships – Men's +105 kg =

The 2001 World Weightlifting Championships were held in Antalya, Turkey from November 4 to November 11. The men's competition in the super heavyweight (+105 kg) division was staged on 11 November 2001.

== Medalists ==
Event	Gold		Silver		Bronze	
Snatch	Jaber Saeed Salem (QAT)	210.0 kg	Roman Meshcheryakov (RUS)	205.0 kg	Andrey Chemerkin (RUS)	200.0 kg
Clean & Jerk	Jaber Saeed Salem (QAT)	250.0 kg	Paweł Najdek (POL)	250.0 kg	Andrey Chemerkin (RUS)	242.5 kg
Total	Jaber Saeed Salem (QAT)	460.0 kg	Roman Meshcheryakov (RUS)	445.0 kg	Andrey Chemerkin (RUS)	442.5 kg

== Records ==
Prior to this competition, the existing world records were as follows.

World Record	Snatch	Hossein Rezazadeh (IRI)	212.5 kg	Sydney, Australia	26 September 2000
World Record	Clean & Jerk	World Standard	262.5 kg	—	1 January 1998
World Record	Total	Hossein Rezazadeh (IRI)	472.5 kg	Sydney, Australia	26 September 2000

== Results ==
Rank	Athlete	Body weight	Snatch (kg)				Clean & Jerk (kg)				Total
Rank	Athlete	Body weight	1	2	3	Rank	1	2	3	Rank	Total
1st place, gold medalist(s)	Jaber Saeed Salem (QAT)	125.74	200.0	205.0	210.0	1st place, gold medalist(s)	245.0	250.0	~~263.0~~	1st place, gold medalist(s)	460.0
2nd place, silver medalist(s)	Roman Meshcheryakov (RUS)	152.30	192.5	200.0	205.0	2nd place, silver medalist(s)	232.5	~~240.0~~	240.0	4	445.0
3rd place, bronze medalist(s)	Andrey Chemerkin (RUS)	176.90	190.0	200.0	~~205.0~~	3rd place, bronze medalist(s)	242.5	~~247.5~~	~~247.5~~	3rd place, bronze medalist(s)	442.5
4	Paweł Najdek (POL)	134.48	180.0	~~185.0~~	185.0	5	235.0	245.0	250.0	2nd place, silver medalist(s)	435.0
5	Tibor Stark (HUN)	139.42	180.0	187.5	190.0	4	~~220.0~~	220.0	225.0	7	415.0
6	Aleko Nozadze (GEO)	116.38	180.0	~~187.5~~	~~187.5~~	7	220.0	225.0	~~230.0~~	5	405.0
7	Axel Franz (GER)	139.36	175.0	182.5	187.5	6	215.0	222.5	~~227.5~~	8	405.0
8	Giorgi Kobaladze (GEO)	122.40	172.5	177.5	~~180.0~~	8	~~225.0~~	225.0	~~232.5~~	6	402.5
9	Nigel Avery (NZL)	123.30	~~170.0~~	~~170.0~~	170.0	9	205.0	210.0	217.5	10	387.5
10	Hildegar Morillo (VEN)	130.42	~~160.0~~	160.0	165.0	10	200.0	212.5	220.0	9	385.0
11	Petr Sobotka (CZE)	145.58	160.0	~~165.0~~	165.0	11	190.0	~~202.5~~	~~202.5~~	12	355.0
12	Cristián Escalante (CHI)	117.82	152.5	162.5	~~167.5~~	12	185.0	~~190.0~~	190.0	11	352.5
