= Weightlifting at the 2004 Summer Olympics – Men's +105 kg =

Weightlifting at the Olympics

Men's +105 kg at the Games of the XXVIII Olympiad
- Venue: Nikaia Olympic Weightlifting Hall
- Date: 25 August 2004
- Competitors: 17 from 15 nations

Medalists
1st place, gold medalist(s)		Hossein Rezazadeh	Iran
2nd place, silver medalist(s)		Viktors Ščerbatihs	Latvia
3rd place, bronze medalist(s)		Velichko Cholakov	Bulgaria

The men's +105 kilograms weightlifting event at the 2004 Summer Olympics in Athens, Greece took place at the Nikaia Olympic Weightlifting Hall on 25 August.

Total score was the sum of the lifter's best result in each of the snatch and the clean and jerk, with three lifts allowed for each lift. In case of a tie, the lighter lifter won; if still tied, the lifter who took the fewest attempts to achieve the total score won. Lifters without a valid snatch score did not perform the clean and jerk.

Rezazadeh actually lifted 263.5 kg in the clean and jerk portion of the competition for the world record, but for the competition results, the weight was normalized to the standard interval of 2.5 kg.

== Schedule ==
All times are Eastern European Summer Time (UTC+03:00)

Date	Time	Event
25 August 2004	16:30	Group B
25 August 2004	20:00	Group A

== Records ==
{{{caption}}}
World Record	Snatch	Hossein Rezazadeh (IRI)	213.0 kg	Qinhuangdao, China	14 September 2003
World Record	Clean & Jerk	Hossein Rezazadeh (IRI)	263.0 kg	Warsaw, Poland	26 November 2002
World Record	Total	Hossein Rezazadeh (IRI)	472.5 kg	Sydney, Australia	26 September 2000
Olympic Record	Snatch	Hossein Rezazadeh (IRI)	212.5 kg	Sydney, Australia	26 September 2000
Olympic Record	Clean & Jerk	Olympic Standard	260.0 kg	—	1 January 1997
Olympic Record	Total	Hossein Rezazadeh (IRI)	472.5 kg	Sydney, Australia	26 September 2000

== Results ==
Rank	Athlete	Group	Body weight	Snatch (kg)				Clean & Jerk (kg)				Total
Rank	Athlete	Group	Body weight	1	2	3	Result	1	2	3	Result	Total
1st place, gold medalist(s)	Hossein Rezazadeh (IRI)	A	162.95	200.0	207.5	210.0	210.0	250.0	~~263.5~~	263.5	262.5	472.5
2nd place, silver medalist(s)	Viktors Ščerbatihs (LAT)	A	140.72	197.5	202.5	205.0	205.0	242.5	~~247.5~~	250.0	250.0	455.0
3rd place, bronze medalist(s)	Velichko Cholakov (BUL)	A	161.31	200.0	205.0	207.5	207.5	240.0	~~245.0~~	~~245.0~~	240.0	447.5
4	Hennadiy Krasylnykov (UKR)	B	118.43	~~195.0~~	195.0	200.0	200.0	235.0	~~240.0~~	240.0	240.0	440.0
5	Oleksiy Kolokoltsev (UKR)	A	125.07	190.0	~~195.0~~	195.0	195.0	235.0	242.5	~~252.5~~	242.5	437.5
6	Paweł Najdek (POL)	A	140.44	182.5	187.5	190.0	190.0	240.0	~~250.0~~	~~250.0~~	240.0	430.0
7	Shane Hamman (USA)	A	158.93	192.5	~~197.5~~	~~197.5~~	192.5	230.0	237.5	~~242.5~~	237.5	430.0
8	An Yong-kwon (KOR)	A	136.90	195.0	202.5	~~205.0~~	202.5	225.0	~~235.0~~	~~240.0~~	225.0	427.5
9	Igor Khalilov (UZB)	B	145.33	180.0	185.0	187.5	187.5	225.0	~~232.5~~	232.5	232.5	420.0
10	Grzegorz Kleszcz (POL)	B	124.33	185.0	190.0	~~192.5~~	190.0	225.0	~~230.0~~	~~230.0~~	225.0	415.0
11	Mohamed Ihsan (EGY)	B	142.72	180.0	185.0	~~190.0~~	185.0	220.0	~~227.5~~	~~232.5~~	220.0	405.0
12	Takanobu Iwazaki (JPN)	B	127.70	165.0	~~170.0~~	170.0	170.0	215.0	~~225.0~~	~~225.0~~	215.0	385.0
13	Joel Bran (GUA)	B	134.26	150.0	160.0	~~165.0~~	160.0	~~210.0~~	210.0	~~220.0~~	210.0	370.0
14	Itte Detenamo (NRU)	B	137.65	147.5	152.5	155.0	155.0	192.5	~~197.5~~	—	192.5	347.5
—	Stian Grimseth (NOR)	B	158.30	180.0	185.0	~~190.0~~	185.0	~~205.0~~	—	—	—	—
—	Ronny Weller (GER)	A	151.84	195.0	~~200.0~~	~~202.5~~	195.0	—	—	—	—	—
—	Ashot Danielyan (ARM)	A	163.27	~~200.0~~	~~200.0~~	~~200.0~~	—	—	—	—	—	—

== New records ==
Clean & Jerk	263.5 kg	Hossein Rezazadeh (IRI)	WR
