= Paweł Najdek =

Polish weightlifter

Pawel Najdek
Personal information
- Born: 9 April 1973 (age 52) Nowy Tomyśl, Poland
- Height: 182 cm (6 ft 0 in)
- Weight: 138.74 kg (305.9 lb)

Sport
- Country: Poland
- Sport: Weightlifting
- Weight class: +105 kg
- Club: Okęcie Warszawa, Warszawa (POL)
- Team: National team
- Updated on 12 September 2016

Pawel Najdek (born 9 April 1973, in Nowy Tomyśl) is a Polish male weightlifter, competing in the +105 kg category and representing Poland at international competitions. He participated at the 2000 Summer Olympics in the +105 kg event and also at the 2004 Summer Olympics in the +105 kg event. He competed at world championships, most recently at the 2005 World Weightlifting Championships.

== Major results ==
- (silver) 2001 European Championships +105 kg (420.0 kg)
- (silver) 2002 European Championships +105 kg (430.0 kg)
- (bronze) 2006 European Championships +105 kg (432.0 kg)
- (bronze) 2007 European Championships +105 kg (421.0 kg)

Year	Venue	Weight	Snatch (kg)				Clean & Jerk (kg)				Total	Rank
Year	Venue	Weight	1	2	3	Rank	1	2	3	Rank	Total	Rank
Summer Olympics
2004	Athens, Greece	+105 kg	182.5	187.5	190.0	10	240.0	~~250.0~~	~~250.0~~	5	430.0	6
2000	Sydney, Australia	+105 kg	180.0	~~185.0~~	185.0	11	240.0	~~245.0~~	~~250.0~~	7	425.0	7
World Championships
2005	Doha, Qatar	+105 kg	182	187	~~190~~	7	233	238	~~245~~	5	425.0	7
2003	Vancouver, Canada	+105 kg	182.5	~~187.5~~	187.5	10	240	~~245~~	~~250~~	5	427.5	7
2002	Warsaw, Poland	+105 kg	~~182.5~~	~~182.5~~	~~185~~	---	240	~~245~~	~~245~~	3rd place, bronze medalist(s)	0	---
2001	Antalya, Turkey	+105 kg	180	~~185~~	185	5	235	245	250	2nd place, silver medalist(s)	435	4
1999	Piraeus, Greece	+105 kg	172.5	177.5	~~180~~	18	225	232.5	~~237.5~~	11	410	14
1998	Lahti, Finland	+105 kg	170	175	~~180~~	7	225	~~232.5~~	232.5	2nd place, silver medalist(s)	407.5	4
