= Iwazaki =

Iwazaki (written: 岩崎) is a Japanese surname. Notable people with the surname include:

- Suguru Iwazaki (岩崎 優, born 1991), Japanese baseball player
- Takanobu Iwazaki (岩崎 宇信, born 1975), Japanese weightlifter
