= Oleksiy Kolokoltsev =

Ukrainian weightlifter (born 1981)

Personal information
- Full name: Oleksiy Viktorovych Kolokoltsev
- Born: 14 February 1981 (age 45)
- Height: 182 cm (6 ft 0 in)
- Weight: 121.99 kg (268.9 lb)

Sport
- Country: Ukraine
- Sport: Weightlifting
- Weight class: +105 kg
- Club: Kolos Odesa, Odesa (UKR)
- Team: National team
Medal record
European Championships
| Bronze medal – third place | 2002 Antalya | +105 kg |
- Updated on 12 September 2016

Oleksiy Viktorovych Kolokoltsev (Олексій Вікторович Колокольцев, born 14 February 1981) is a Ukrainian male weightlifter, competing in the +105 kg category and representing Ukraine at international competitions. He participated at the 2004 Summer Olympics in the +105 kg event. He competed at world championships, most recently at the 2005 World Weightlifting Championships.

== Major results ==
- (bronze) 2002 European Championships +105 kg (427.5 kg)

| Year | Venue | Weight | Snatch (kg) | | | | Clean & Jerk (kg) | | | | Total | Rank |
| Year | Venue | Weight | 1 | 2 | 3 | Rank | 1 | 2 | 3 | Rank | Total | Rank |
Summer Olympics
| 2004 | Athens, Greece | +105 kg | 190 | ~~195~~ | 195 | —N/a | 235 | 242.5 | ~~252.5~~ | —N/a | 437.5 | 5 |
World Championships
| 2005 | Doha, Qatar | +105 kg | 185 | ~~189~~ | ~~189~~ | 9 | 226 | ~~235~~ | ~~235~~ | 9 | 411.0 | 9 |
| 2003 | Vancouver, Canada | +105 kg | 190 | ~~195~~ | 195 | 6 | 240 | ~~247.5~~ | ~~250~~ | 4 | 435 | 5 |
