= Mohamed Masoud =

Mohamed Masoud may refer to:

- Mohamed Masoud (volleyball) (born 1994), Egyptian volleyball player
- Mohamed Masoud (weightlifter) (born 1984), Egyptian Olympic weightlifter
