= Isca Kam =

Nauruan weightlifter

Personal information
- Full name: Isca Kam
- Born: 7 July 1980 (age 45)
- Weight: 126.07 kg (277.9 lb)

Sport
- Country: Nauru
- Sport: Weightlifting
- Weight class: +105 kg
- Team: National team
- Updated on 4 October 2016

Isca Kam (born 7 July 1980) is a Nauruan male weightlifter, competing in the +105 kg category and representing Nauru at international competitions. He competed at world championships, most recently at the 1998 World Weightlifting Championships.

== Major results ==
Year	Venue	Weight	Snatch (kg)					Clean & Jerk (kg)					Total	Rank
Year	Venue	Weight	1	2	3	Result	Rank	1	2	3	Result	Rank	Total	Rank
World Championships
1998	Lahti, Finland	+105 kg	135.0	~~142.5~~	~~142.5~~	135.0	18	172.5	—	—	172.5	16	307.5	16
1997	Chiang Mai, Thailand	+108 kg	130.0	140.0	~~145.0~~	140.0	13	170.0	180.0	~~190.0~~	180.0	16	320.0	15
Commonwealth Games
1998	Kuala Lumpur, Malaysia	+108 kg	135.0	140.0	142.5	142.5	6	—N/a	—N/a	—N/a	187.5	5	330.0	5
