= Petr Sobotka =

Czech weightlifter

Personal information
- Full name: Petr Sobotka
- Born: 30 April 1975 (age 51) Duchcov, Czech Republic
- Height: 190 cm (6 ft 3 in)
- Weight: 151.79 kg (334.6 lb)

Sport
- Country: Czech Republic
- Sport: Weightlifting
- Weight class: +105 kg
- Club: PSK Olymp Praha (CZE)
- Team: National team
- Updated on 7 September 2016

Petr Sobotka (born 30 April 1975 in Duchcov) is a Czech male weightlifter, competing in the +105 kg category and representing Czech Republic at international competitions. He participated at the 2000 Summer Olympics in the +105 kg event. He competed at world championships, most recently at the 2009 World Weightlifting Championships.

== Major results ==
Year	Venue	Weight	Snatch (kg)				Clean & Jerk (kg)				Total	Rank
Year	Venue	Weight	1	2	3	Rank	1	2	3	Rank	Total	Rank
Summer Olympics
2000	Sydney, Australia	+105 kg										14
World Championships
2009	Goyang, South Korea	+105 kg	170	~~175~~	~~175~~	14	205	211	~~213~~	13	381	11
2007	Chiang Mai, Thailand	+105 kg	166	~~170~~	170	19	204	~~209~~	~~210~~	21	374	16
2006	Santo Domingo, Dominican Republic	+105 kg	170	~~175~~	~~175~~	13	210	~~220~~	---	13	380.0	13
2005	Doha, Qatar	+105 kg	~~177~~	177	~~181~~	13	~~215~~	215	~~224~~	14	392.0	13
2003	Vancouver, Canada	+105 kg	175	180	~~185~~	18	215	~~220~~	~~220~~	16	395	17
2002	Warsaw, Poland	+105 kg	180	~~185~~	~~185~~	11	212.5	220	~~225~~	10	400	8
2001	Antalya, Turkey	+105 kg	160	~~165~~	165	11	190	~~202.5~~	~~202.5~~	12	355	11
