= Iran Sportsperson of the Year =

Annual sports award in Iran

Iran Sportsperson of the Year (Persian: ورزشکار سال ایران) was an annual election from 2000 to 2008, organized by Iran's Physical Education Organization and IRIB, which honours outstanding achievement(s) in sport by Iranian athletes during the previous Iranian year.

== Winners ==
=== 1379–1386 ===
Year Iranian (Gregorian)	Winner (Sport)
1379 (2000–2001)	Hossein Rezazadeh (Weightlifting)
1380 (2001–2002)	Hassan Rangraz (Wrestling)
1381 (2002–2003)	Hossein Rezazadeh (Weightlifting)
1382 (2003–2004)	Hossein Rezazadeh (Weightlifting)
1383 (2004–2005)	Hadi Saei (Taekwondo)
1384 (2005–2006)	Hossein Rezazadeh (Weightlifting)
1385 (2006–2007)	Ehsan Haddadi (Athletics); Morad Mohammadi (Wrestling)
1386 (2007–2008)	Hamid Sourian (Wrestling)

=== 1401–present ===
Year Iranian (Gregorian)	Sportsman of the Year	Sportswoman of the Year	Team of the Year	Ref.
1401 (2022–2023)	Hadi Choopan (Bodybuilding)	Elham Hosseini (Weightlifting)	Greco-Roman wrestling U20 team	
1402 (2023–2024)	Amin Mirzazadeh (Wrestling)	Nahid Kiani (Taekwondo)	National beach soccer team	
1403 (2024–2025)	Mehdi Taremi (Football)	Nahid Kiani (Taekwondo)	National women's handball team	
1404 (2025–2026)	Amir Hossein Zare (Wrestling)	Zahra Kiani (Wushu)	National futsal team	

== See also ==
- Athlete of the Year
- Laureus World Sports Award for Sportsman of the Year (Laureus World Sports Academy)
- Laureus World Sports Award for Sportswoman of the Year
