= Jon Tecedor =

Spanish weightlifter

Personal information
- Full name: Jon Tecedor Anguinaga
- Born: 16 September 1975 San Sebastián, Spain
- Died: 15 June 2008 (aged 32) San Sebastián, Spain
- Height: 179 cm (5 ft 10 in)
- Weight: 145.52 kg (321 lb)

Sport
- Country: Spain
- Sport: Weightlifting
- Weight class: +105 kg
- Club: Danena Zizurkil
- Team: National team
- Updated on 2 October 2016

Jon Tecedor Anguinaga (16 September 1975 in San Sebastián – 15 June 2008 in San Sebastián) was a Spanish male weightlifter, competing in the +105 kg category and representing Spain at international competitions. He participated in the 2000 Summer Olympics in the +105 kg event. He competed at world championships, most recently at the 1999 World Weightlifting Championships. Tecedor's best performance was at the 1998 World Championships, when he finished seventh in the +105 kg weight class. The Basque athlete, winner of several Spanish titles in different categories, qualified for the Olympics, but had to contend himself with 13th place there. Outside of weightlifting, Tecedor worked as an electrical engineer, and as an attendant in a paint store. En route to the 2008 Basque Weightlifting Championships, Jon Tecedor's motorcycle was struck by a car, and Tecedor was killed immediately.

== Major results ==
| Year | Venue | Weight | Snatch (kg) | | | | Clean & Jerk (kg) | | | | Total | Rank |
| Year | Venue | Weight | 1 | 2 | 3 | Rank | 1 | 2 | 3 | Rank | Total | Rank |
Summer Olympics
| 2000 | Sydney, Australia | +105 kg | | | | —N/a | | | | —N/a | | 13 |
World Championships
| 1999 | Piraeus, Greece | +105 kg | 170 | 175 | 180 | 17 | 210 | 220 | ~~222.5~~ | 18 | 400 | 17 |
| 1998 | Lahti, Finland | +105 kg | 165 | ~~170~~ | 170 | 9 | 210 | 215 | ~~220~~ | 7 | 385 | 7 |
