= Cristián Escalante =

Chilean weightlifter (born 1976)

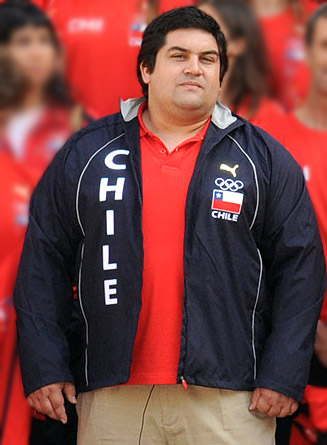
- Escalante in 2011 before the Pan American Games

Personal information
- Born: 11 September 1976 (age 49) Santiago, Chile
- Weight: 125 kg (276 lb)

Sport
- Sport: Weightlifting
- Event: +105 kg
Medal record
Representing Chile
Men's weightlifting
Pan American Games
| Gold medal – first place | 2007 Rio de Janeiro | +105 kg |
| Silver medal – second place | 2003 Santo Domingo | +105 kg |
| Silver medal – second place | 1999 Winnipeg | +105 kg |

Cristián Escalante (born 11 September 1976 in Santiago) is a Chilean a weightlifter competing in the +105 kg category. Escalante has competed in three Pan American Games starting in 1999. In 1996, he became the first weightlifter to qualify for the Olympics from Chile.

After placing silver at the 1999 and winning the silver medal at the 2003 Pan American Games, Escalante finally won a gold medal at the 2007 Pan American Games in Rio de Janeiro. In this process, he broke the Pan American Games record in the overall competition by lifting a total of 401 kilograms (884 lb).

In September 2011, Escalante was named the flag bearer for the Chilean team at the 2011 Pan American Games in Guadalajara, Mexico. Escalante was scheduled to compete in his fourth Pan American Games, however he did not carry the flag or compete after testing positive for steroids.

== Major results ==
| Year | Venue | Weight | Snatch (kg) | | | | | Clean & Jerk (kg) | | | | | Total | Rank |
| Year | Venue | Weight | 1 | 2 | 3 | Result | Rank | 1 | 2 | 3 | Result | Rank | Total | Rank |
Representing Chile
Olympic Games
| 1996 | Atlanta, United States | 99 kg | 132.5 | 137.5 | 142.5 | 142.5 | 23 | 162.5 | 167.5 | 172.5 | 172.5 | 22 | 315.0 | 22 |
World Championships
| 2006 | Santo Domingo, Dominican Republic | +105 kg | 160 | ~~167~~ | 167 | 167 | 14 | ~~195~~ | 195 | 202 | 202 | 15 | 369 | 16 |
| 2002 | Warsaw, Poland | +105 kg | 155.0 | 160.0 | 165.0 | 165.0 | 16 | ~~180.0~~ | 180.0 | — | 180.0 | 20 | 345.0 | 17 |
| 2001 | Antalya, Turkey | +105 kg | 152.5 | 162.5 | ~~167.5~~ | 162.5 | 12 | 185.0 | ~~190.0~~ | 190.0 | 190.0 | 11 | 352.5 | 12 |
| 1999 | Athens, Greece | 105 kg | 160.0 | ~~165.0~~ | ~~165.0~~ | 160.0 | 26 | 190.0 | — | — | 190.0 | 30 | 350.0 | 26 |
| 1997 | Chiang Mai, Thailand | 99 kg | 152.5 | ~~157.5~~ | 157.5 | 157.5 | 15 | 182.5 | ~~187.5~~ | ~~187.5~~ | 182.5 | 19 | 340.0 | 17 |
Pan American Games
| 2007 | Rio de Janeiro, Brazil | +105 kg | 170 | 177 | 180 | 180 | 1 | 207 | 215 | 221 | 221 | 1 | 401 | 1st place, gold medalist(s) |
| 2003 | Santo Domingo, Dominican Republic | +105 kg | —N/a | —N/a | —N/a | 167.5 | —N/a | —N/a | —N/a | —N/a | 205.0 | —N/a | 372.5 | 2nd place, silver medalist(s) |
| 1999 | Winnipeg, Canada *^{1} | +105 kg | —N/a | —N/a | —N/a | 165.0 | 2 | —N/a | —N/a | —N/a | 205.0 | 3 | 370.0 | 2nd place, silver medalist(s) |

Note:

- ^{1} After the competition he was fourth place, but later the originally silver medalist Cuban Modesto Sánchez and bronze medalist Puerto Rican Edries González was disqualified for used banned substances.
