= Jaber Saeed Salem =

Qatari weightlifter

Personal information
- Nationality: Bulgarian, Qatari
- Born: Yani Marchokov; 3 January 1975 (age 51)
- Height: 1.85 m (6 ft 1 in)
- Weight: 125 kg (276 lb)

Sport
- Country: Bulgaria; Qatar
- Sport: Weightlifting
- Event: +105 kg

Achievements and titles
- Personal bests: Snatch: 210 kg (2001); Clean and jerk: 255 kg (2000); Total: 460 kg (2000)
Medal record
Men's weightlifting
Representing Qatar
World Championships
Gold medal – first place	2001 Antalya	+105 kg
Silver medal – second place	1999 Athens	+105 kg
Bronze medal – third place	2005 Doha	+105 kg
Bronze medal – third place	2007 Chiang Mai	+105 kg
Asian Games
Silver medal – second place	2006 Doha	+105 kg
Asian Championships
Gold medal – first place	2004 Almaty	+105 kg
Silver medal – second place	2005 Dubai	+105 kg
Silver medal – second place	2007 Tai'an	+105 kg

Jaber Saeed Salem (born Yani Marchokov, 3 January 1975) is a Qatari weightlifter who competed in the Men's 105+ kg weight class at the 2000 Summer Olympics and finished fourth with a 460 kg total (205 kg and 255 kg). He was born in Bulgaria.

One of eight Bulgarian weightlifters recruited by the Qatar Olympic Committee for $1,000,000, Jaber became a Qatari citizen to represent the country in the 2000 Olympics. His old name, Yani Marchokov, was left behind in the process. Qatar has been known for recruiting sportspeople from other countries, the most notable examples being fellow weightlifter Said Saif Asaad (formerly Angel Popov of Bulgaria) and world-class runner Saif Saaeed Shaheen.

At the 2003 World Championships, he snatched 210 kg which turned out to be the gold medal in the snatch competition. He withdrew from the clean and jerk.

Jaber was set to compete at the 2004 Summer Olympics, but pulled out.

At the 2005 World Championships, he won the bronze medal with a total of 446 kg, and at the 2007 World Championships, he won the bronze medal with a total of 435 kg.

== Major results ==
Year	Venue	Weight	Snatch (kg)				Clean & Jerk (kg)				Total	Rank
Year	Venue	Weight	1	2	3	Rank	1	2	3	Rank	Total	Rank
Olympic Games
2000	Sydney, Australia	+105 kg	200	205	~~210~~	3	250	255	~~260~~	5	460	4
World Championships
1999	Athens, Greece	+105 kg	190	200	205	1st place, gold medalist(s)	240	~~250~~	250	3rd place, bronze medalist(s)	455	2nd place, silver medalist(s)
2001	Antalya, Turkey	+105 kg	200	205	210	1st place, gold medalist(s)	245	250	~~263~~	1st place, gold medalist(s)	460	1st place, gold medalist(s)
2003	Vancouver, Canada	+105 kg	200	205	210	1st place, gold medalist(s)	--	--	--	--	--	--
2005	Doha, Qatar	+105 kg	195	201	~~203~~	3rd place, bronze medalist(s)	240	245	--	3rd place, bronze medalist(s)	446	3rd place, bronze medalist(s)
2007	Chiang Mai, Thailand	+105 kg	~~195~~	195	~~200~~	4	231	240	~~243~~	2nd place, silver medalist(s)	435	3rd place, bronze medalist(s)
Asian Games
2006	Doha, Qatar	+105 kg	175	185	--	2	215	225	--	2	410	2nd place, silver medalist(s)
Asian Championships
2004	Almaty, Kazakhstan	+105 kg	190			1st place, gold medalist(s)	230			1st place, gold medalist(s)	420	1st place, gold medalist(s)
2005	Dubai, United Arab Emirates	+105 kg	190			2nd place, silver medalist(s)	232			2nd place, silver medalist(s)	422	2nd place, silver medalist(s)
2007	Tai'an, China	+105 kg	192			2nd place, silver medalist(s)	235			1st place, gold medalist(s)	427	2nd place, silver medalist(s)
Junior World Championships
1995	Warsaw, Poland	–108 kg	160	165	~~167.5~~	4	190	~~200~~	~~200~~	3rd place, bronze medalist(s)	355	3rd place, bronze medalist(s)
European Junior Championships
1995	Beersheba, Israel	–108 kg	160	~~165~~	~~165~~	4	192.5	200	~~210~~	2nd place, silver medalist(s)	360	3rd place, bronze medalist(s)
