= Ara Vardanyan (weightlifter) =

Armenian weightlifter

Medal record

Men's Weightlifting

Representing Armenia

World Championships
Silver medal – second place	1998 Lahti	-+105 kg

European Championships
Bronze medal – third place	1998 Riesa	-+105 kg

Ara Vardanyan (Armenian: Արա Վարդանյան, born December 21, 1974, in Bambakashat, Armenia) is an Armenian weightlifter.

Vardanyan won a silver medal at the 1998 World Weightlifting Championships. He competed at the 1996 Summer Olympics, coming in 7th place.

== Major results ==
Year	Venue	Weight	Snatch (kg)					Clean & Jerk (kg)					Total	Rank
Year	Venue	Weight	1	2	3	Results	Rank	1	2	3	Results	Rank	Total	Rank
Representing Ukraine
European Championships
2005	Sofia, Bulgaria	+105 kg	195.0	200.0	~~202.5~~	200.0	3rd place, bronze medalist(s)	230.0	235.0	—	235.0	7	435.0	5
2004	Kyiv, Ukraine	+105 kg	195.0	200.0	~~202.5~~	200.0	1st place, gold medalist(s)	~~230.0~~	~~232.5~~	~~232.5~~	—	—	—	—
Representing Armenia
Olympic Games
1996	Atlanta, United States	108 kg	~~180.0~~	180.0	~~185.0~~	180.0	7	~~215.0~~	215.0	~~220.0~~	215.0	9	395.0	7
World Championships
1999	Athens, Greece	+105 kg	195.0	200.0	~~205.0~~	200.0	4	~~230.0~~	—	—	—	—	—	—
1998	Lahti, Finland	+105 kg	190.0	195.0	197.5	197.5	1st place, gold medalist(s)	230.0	~~237.5~~	—	230.0	3rd place, bronze medalist(s)	427.5	2nd place, silver medalist(s)
1995	Guangzhou, China	108 kg	~~175.0~~	175.0	~~177.5~~	175.0	8	200.0	210.0	~~217.5~~	210.0	12	385.0	9
European Championships
1998	Riesa, Germany	+105 kg	~~190.0~~	~~190.0~~	190.0	190.0	4	220.0	230.0	235.0	235.0	3rd place, bronze medalist(s)	425.0	3rd place, bronze medalist(s)
1995	Warsaw, Poland	108 kg	—N/a	—N/a	—N/a	180.0	3rd place, bronze medalist(s)	—N/a	—N/a	—N/a	217.5	4	397.5	4
