= Tibor Stark =

Hungarian weightlifter

Personal information
- Nickname: Gerecse Medvéje / Bear of Gerecse
- Nationality: Hungarian
- Born: Tibor Stark; 14 February 1972 (age 54) Tata, Hungary

Sport
- Country: Hungary
- Sport: Weightlifting
- Event: –+105kg
- Club: Tatabányai Bányász Sport Club

Tibor Stark (born 14 February 1972 in Tata, Komárom-Esztergom) is a retired male weightlifter from Hungary. He competed for his native country in three consecutive Summer Olympics, starting in 1992 (Barcelona, Spain). A European champion in 1997, he ended up in 8th place in 1996 and 2000 in the men's superheavyweight division (+ 105 kg).

== Major results ==
Year	Venue	Weight	Snatch (kg)					Clean & Jerk (kg)					Total	Rank
Year	Venue	Weight	1	2	3	Results	Rank	1	2	3	Results	Rank	Total	Rank
Representing Hungary
Olympic Games
2000	Sydney, Australia	+105 kg	180.0	190.0	195.0	195.0	8	220.0	230.0	—	230.0	9	425.0	8
1996	Atlanta, United States	+108 kg	180.0	185.0	187.5	187.5	6	220.0	227.5	~~230.0~~	227.5	8	415.0	8
1992	Barcelona, Spain	110 kg	160.0	165.0	~~167.5~~	165.0	14	190.0	~~195.0~~	—	190.0	18	355.0	15
World Championships
2003	Vancouver, Canada	+105 kg	180.0	185.0	—	185.0	13	210.0	—	—	210.0	20	395.0	16
2001	Antalya, Turkey	+105 kg	180.0	187.5	190.0	190.0	4	~~220.0~~	220.0	225.0	225.0	7	415.0	5
1999	Athens, Greece	+105 kg	180.0	185.0	190.0	190.0	12	220.0	227.5	—	227.5	16	417.5	12
1997	Chiang Mai, Thailand	+108 kg	180.0	185.0	~~190.0~~	185.0	4	215.0	220.0	~~225.0~~	220.0	6	405.0	4
1995	Guangzhou, China	+108 kg	~~180.0~~	180.0	185.0	185.0	4	217.5	~~220.0~~	~~220.0~~	217.5	9	402.5	11
European Championships
1999	La Coruña, Spain	+105 kg	~~185.0~~	~~185.0~~	~~187.5~~	—	—	—	—	—	—	—	—	—
1998	Riesa, Germany	+105 kg	180.0	185.0	~~187.5~~	185.0	6	215.0	—	—	215.0	11	400.0	7
1997	Rijeka, Croatia	+108 kg	182.5	187.5	~~190.0~~	187.5	2nd place, silver medalist(s)	225.0	~~230.0~~	~~230.0~~	225.0	3rd place, bronze medalist(s)	412.5	1st place, gold medalist(s)
1993	Sofia, Bulgaria	108 kg	—N/a	—N/a	—N/a	170.0	9	—N/a	—N/a	—N/a	205.0	9	375.0	9
