= Weightlifting at the 2006 Asian Games – Men's +105 kg =

Men's +105 kg at the 2006 Asian Games
- Venue: Al-Dana Banquet Hall
- Date: 6 December 2006
- Competitors: 8 from 8 nations

Medalists
gold medal	Hossein Rezazadeh	Iran
silver medal	Jaber Saeed Salem	Qatar
bronze medal	Andrey Martemyanov	Uzbekistan

The men's +105 kilograms event at the 2006 Asian Games took place on December 6, 2006 at Al-Dana Banquet Hall in Doha.

== Schedule ==
All times are Arabia Standard Time (UTC+03:00)

Date	Time	Event
Wednesday, 6 December 2006	19:00	Group A

== Records ==
Prior to this competition, the existing world, Asian and Games records were as follows.

World Record	Snatch	Hossein Rezazadeh (IRI)	213 kg	Qinhuangdao, China	14 September 2003
World Record	Clean & Jerk	Hossein Rezazadeh (IRI)	263 kg	Athens, Greece	25 August 2004
World Record	Total	Hossein Rezazadeh (IRI)	472 kg	Sydney, Australia	26 September 2000
Asian Record	Snatch	Hossein Rezazadeh (IRI)	213 kg	Qinhuangdao, China	14 September 2003
Asian Record	Clean & Jerk	Hossein Rezazadeh (IRI)	263 kg	Athens, Greece	25 August 2004
Asian Record	Total	Hossein Rezazadeh (IRI)	472 kg	Sydney, Australia	26 September 2000
Games Record	Snatch	Hossein Rezazadeh (IRI)	200 kg	Busan, South Korea	10 October 2002
Games Record	Clean & Jerk	Hossein Rezazadeh (IRI)	240 kg	Busan, South Korea	10 October 2002
Games Record	Total	Hossein Rezazadeh (IRI)	440 kg	Busan, South Korea	10 October 2002

== Results ==
Rank	Athlete	Group	Body weight	Snatch (kg)				Clean & Jerk (kg)				Total
Rank	Athlete	Group	Body weight	1	2	3	Result	1	2	3	Result	Total
1st place, gold medalist(s)	Hossein Rezazadeh (IRI)	A	163.83	185	190	195	195	230	—	—	230	425
2nd place, silver medalist(s)	Jaber Saeed Salem (QAT)	A	118.94	175	185	—	185	215	225	—	225	410
3rd place, bronze medalist(s)	Andrey Martemyanov (UZB)	A	140.29	160	165	168	168	~~210~~	213	—	213	381
4	Haidar Dakhil (IRQ)	A	136.76	~~165~~	165	174	174	206	~~211~~	~~211~~	206	380
5	Qais Assad (SYR)	A	109.29	~~155~~	~~155~~	155	155	~~191~~	191	~~196~~	191	346
6	Che Azrol Che Mat (MAS)	A	120.18	152	161	~~167~~	161	~~185~~	~~185~~	185	185	346
7	Khalid Al-Shammari (QAT)	A	145.61	120	130	136	136	160	170	176	176	312
8	Feroz Mahmud (BAN)	A	122.87	110	~~115~~	~~120~~	110	130	135	145	145	255
