= Mohamed Ihsan =

Egyptian weightlifter (born 1984)

Mohamed Ihsan Attia Massoud
Personal information
- Born: 11 January 1984 (age 42)
- Height: 184 cm (6 ft 0 in)
- Weight: 160.55 kg (354.0 lb)

Sport
- Country: Egypt
- Sport: Weightlifting
- Team: National team
- Updated on 1 September 2016

Mohamed Ihsan Attia Massoud (محمد احسان, born 11 January 1984) is an Egyptian male weightlifter, competing in the +105 kg category and representing Egypt at international competitions. He competed at world championships, including at the 2015 World Weightlifting Championships. He participated at the 2004 Summer Olympics in the +105 kg event. He won the gold medal at the 2011 Summer Universiade, but was disqualified for using the forbidden substance methylhexanamine.

== Major results ==
Year	Venue	Weight	Snatch (kg)				Clean & Jerk (kg)				Total	Rank
Year	Venue	Weight	1	2	3	Rank	1	2	3	Rank	Total	Rank
Summer Olympics
2004	Athens, Greece	+105 kg	180.0	185.0	~~190.0~~	12	220.0	~~227.5~~	~~232.5~~	11	405.0	11
World Championships
2015	Houston, United States	+105 kg	187	~~196~~	—	14	—	—	—	—	—	—
2014	Almaty, Kazakhstan	+105 kg	188	193	~~197~~	5	235	243	~~247~~	5	436	3rd place, bronze medalist(s)
2013	Wrocław, Poland	+105 kg	180	185	~~188~~	8	231	~~240~~	~~240~~	4	416	4
2010	Antalya, Turkey	+105 kg	180	186	190	9	221	228	---	7	418	7
2009	Goyang, South Korea	+105 kg	~~180~~	180	185	7	225	230	~~234~~	5	415	5
2007	Chiang Mai, Thailand	+105 kg	175	183	~~190~~	10	225	~~233~~	~~235~~	10	408	10
2006	Santo Domingo, Dominican Republic	+105 kg	~~190~~	~~190~~	~~190~~	---	241	~~246~~	~~247~~	3rd place, bronze medalist(s)	0.0	---
2005	Doha, Qatar	+105 kg	~~186~~	~~190~~	190	6	230	238	~~242~~	6	428.0	5
2003	Vancouver, Canada	+105 kg	175	180	~~185~~	17	220	~~232.5~~	~~232.5~~	14	400	12
2002	Warsaw, Poland	+105 kg	175	180	182.5	10	215	~~225~~	~~225~~	12	397.5	9
