= Joel Bran =

Guatemalan weightlifter

Personal information
- Nationality: Guatemalan
- Born: 23 December 1981 (age 43)

Sport
- Sport: Weightlifting

Joel Bran (born 23 December 1981) is a Guatemalan weightlifter. He competed in the men's super heavyweight event at the 2004 Summer Olympics.
