= Hossein Rezazadeh =

Iranian weightlifter (born 1978)

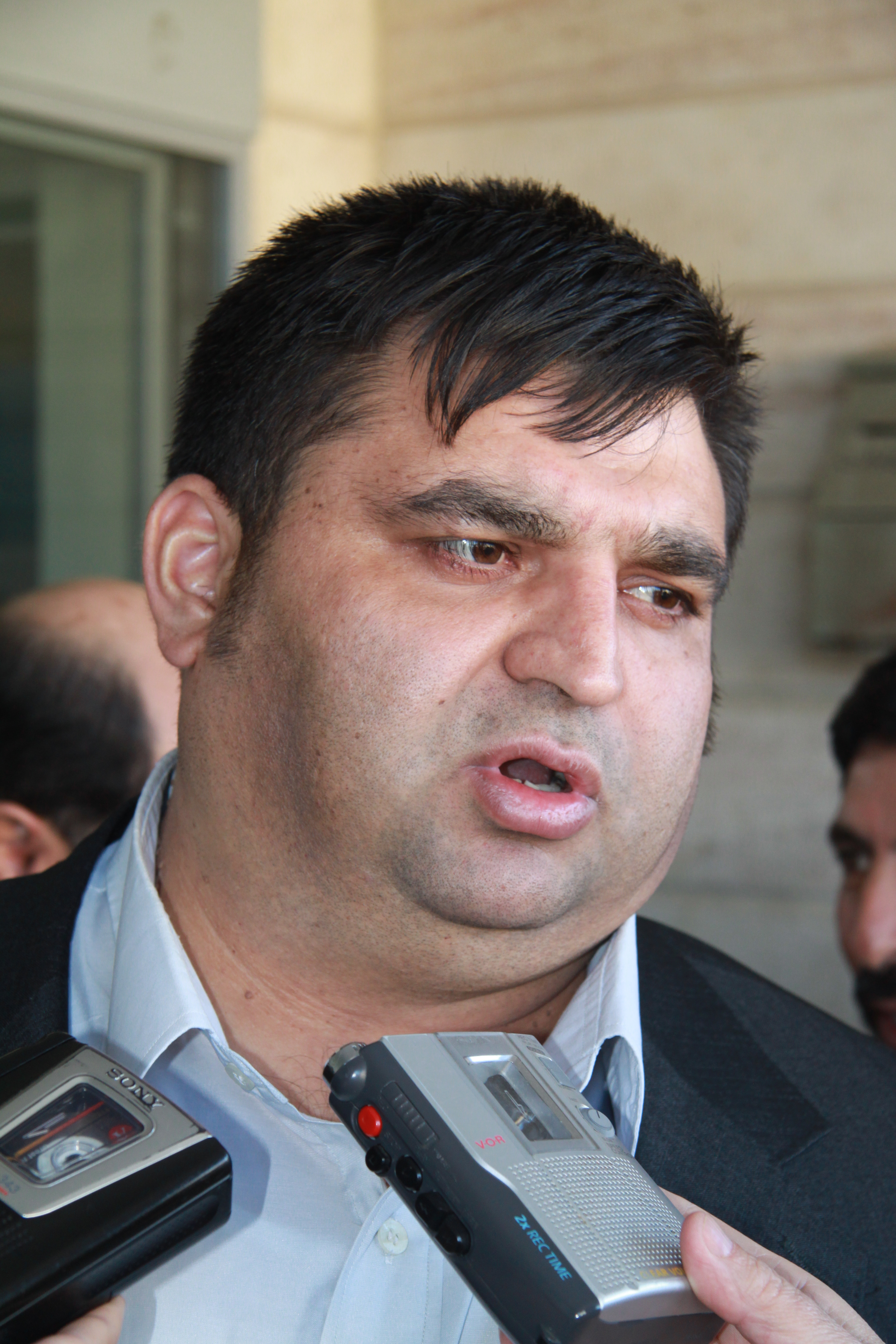

Member of City Council of Tehran
- In office 3 September 2013 – 22 August 2017

Personal details
- Born: 12 May 1978 (age 48) Ardabil, Iran
- Party: Front of Islamic Revolution Stability
- Sports career
- Nationality: Iranian
- Height: 186 cm (6 ft 1 in)
- Weight: 152 kg (335 lb)
- Sport: Weightlifting
- Event: +105 kg

Sports achievements and titles
- Personal bests: Snatch: 213 kg (2003); Clean and jerk: 263.5 kg (2004); Total: 472.5 kg (2000)
Medal record
Men's weightlifting
Representing Iran
Olympic Games
| Gold medal – first place | 2000 Sydney | +105 kg |
| Gold medal – first place | 2004 Athens | +105 kg |
World Championships
| Gold medal – first place | 2002 Warsaw | +105 kg |
| Gold medal – first place | 2003 Vancouver | +105 kg |
| Gold medal – first place | 2005 Doha | +105 kg |
| Gold medal – first place | 2006 Santo Domingo | +105 kg |
| Bronze medal – third place | 1999 Athens | +105 kg |
Asian Games
| Gold medal – first place | 2002 Busan | +105 kg |
| Gold medal – first place | 2006 Doha | +105 kg |
| Bronze medal – third place | 1998 Bangkok | +105 kg |
Asian Championships
| Gold medal – first place | 1999 Wuhan | +105 kg |
| Gold medal – first place | 2003 Qinhuangdao | +105 kg |
| Gold medal – first place | 2005 Dubai | +105 kg |

Hossein Rezazadeh (Persian: حسین رضازاده; born 12 May 1978) is an Iranian politician and retired weightlifter. Rezazadeh is a two-time Olympic champion, four-time World Weightlifting champion, and five-time Asian champion. Rezazadeh has won the Iran Sportsperson of the Year award four times, more than any other athlete in the country's history. Rezazadeh is widely considered one of the greatest weightlifters of all time.

== Weightlifting career ==
Before the International Weightlifting Federation reorganized the categories in 2018, he held the world record in weightlifting's super heavyweight class in the clean and jerk. He is also one of Iran's most noted celebrities, frequently appearing on television and in the news; his wedding, which was held in the holy city of Mecca, in February 2003 was broadcast live on state television in Iran.

In 2002 he was voted the "Champion of Champions" of Iran and was one of 16 Iranian athletes granted a badge of courage from Iranian President Mohammad Khatami. As a reward for setting a world record in the clean and jerk at the 2002 World Weightlifting Championships in Warsaw, Poland, Mohammad Khatami awarded him 600 million rials (a little more than US$60,000 at the time) to buy a house in Tehran. After his spectacular performance, he was offered by Turkey's Weightlifting Federation a stipend of US$20,000 a month, as well as a luxury villa and US$10 million reward if he switched nationalities and won gold for Turkey at the 2004 Athens Olympics, but he turned down their offer. Rezazadeh rejected the tempting offer saying, "I am an Iranian and love my country and people."

Rezazadeh surprised many at the 2000 Summer Olympics, earning a gold medal and breaking the decades-old monopoly on the gold by the Soviet Union and then Russia. His gold medal was the first since 1960 by a non-Soviet or non-Russian athlete in the over 105 kg class at a non boycotted Games. He broke his records in the clean and jerk at the 2004 Summer Olympics again leading up to 263.5 kg (580.9 pounds). His total (both lifts combined) at the 2004 Summer Olympics of 472.5 kg was 17.5 kg more than silver medalist Viktors Ščerbatihs. He has been named IWF World Weightlifter of the Year, and was shortlisted for weightlifter of the century.

Rezazadeh was also referred to by weightlifting commentators as "the strongest man in the world", primarily due to his world records in the olympics.

In 2006 the Rezazadeh Stadium was built in Rezazadeh's hometown of Ardabil. It was built to honour the achievements of Rezazadeh and is one of the most modern and innovative indoor arenas in Iran today.

In early 2008 Rezazadeh participated in a television commercial promoting a real estate agency based in Dubai. His participation surprised many of his fans and was seen as demeaning to both himself and his country, given the promotion of buying estates in a land deemed as a rival. This eventually led to the decision of the Iranian Majles to ban any sort of sponsorship from any high-profile Iranian - i.e. athlete, actor, singer - for any sort of product or service, due to the direct encouragement of product consumerism.

In 2008, Rezazadeh was advised by Dr. Mohammad Ali Shahi, his physician and medical athletic trainer, not to participate in the 2008 Olympics due to his severe hand injuries and his high blood pressure. To his fans' surprise and disappointment he officially announced in a letter read via National Iranian Television that he had accepted the advice. The next day Rezazdeh wrote another public letter announcing his retirement from professional weightlifting. He said "I am pretty sure that my fellow country men will repeat my accomplishments again and I hope my son Abulfazl will break my own records in future".

Immediately following his retirement Rezazdeh was appointed as the Prime Counselor for Iranian national weight lifting federation.

In September 2008, Rezazadeh was named manager and head coach of Iran's national weightlifting team. In January 2009, he was blamed for positive results of the steroid tests of four Iranian weightlifters. Later on, one of the team members, Saeid Alihosseini accused him of using steroids in 2006. Rezazadeh has publicly vowed to fight doping in weightlifting.

== Political career ==
Rezazadeh was elected as a member of City Council of Tehran in 2013 local elections.

== Major result ==
| Year | Venue | Weight | Snatch (kg) | | | | | Clean & jerk (kg) | | | | | Total | Rank |
| Year | Venue | Weight | 1 | 2 | 3 | Result | Rank | 1 | 2 | 3 | Result | Rank | Total | Rank |
Olympic Games
| 2000 | Sydney, Australia | +105 kg | 205.0 | ~~210.0~~ | 212.5 | 212.5 | 1 | 250.0 | 255.0 | 260.0 | 260.0 | 2 | 472.5 | 1st place, gold medalist(s) |
| 2004 | Athens, Greece | +105 kg | 200.0 | 207.5 | 210.0 | 210.0 | 1 | 250.0 | ~~263.5~~ | 263.5 | 262.5 | 1 | 472.5^{[a]} | 1st place, gold medalist(s) |
World Championships
| 1999 | Athens, Greece | +105 kg | ~~200.0~~ | 200.0 | 206.0 | 205.0 | 2nd place, silver medalist(s) | 242.5 | ~~252.5~~ | ~~252.5~~ | 242.5 | 5 | 447.5 | 3rd place, bronze medalist(s) |
| 2002 | Warsaw, Poland | +105 kg | 200.0 | 205.0 | 210.0 | 210.0 | 1st place, gold medalist(s) | 252.5 | 263.0 | — | 262.5 | 1st place, gold medalist(s) | 472.5 | 1st place, gold medalist(s) |
| 2003 | Vancouver, Canada | +105 kg | 200.0 | 207.5 | ~~213.5~~ | 207.5 | 2nd place, silver medalist(s) | 250.0 | ~~263.5~~ | — | 250.0 | 1st place, gold medalist(s) | 457.5 | 1st place, gold medalist(s) |
| 2005 | Doha, Qatar | +105 kg | 201 | 205 | 210 | 210 | 2nd place, silver medalist(s) | 251 | ~~263~~ | — | 251 | 1st place, gold medalist(s) | 461 | 1st place, gold medalist(s) |
| 2006 | Santo Domingo, Dominican Republic | +105 kg | 196 | 202 | ~~206~~ | 202 | 1st place, gold medalist(s) | 242 | 246 | — | 246 | 1st place, gold medalist(s) | 448 | 1st place, gold medalist(s) |
Asian Games
| 1998 | Bangkok, Thailand | +105 kg | 187.5 | | | 187.5 | 3 | 227.5 | | | 227.5 | 3 | 415.0 | 3rd place, bronze medalist(s) |
| 2002 | Busan, South Korea | +105 kg | 190.0 | 200.0 | — | 200.0 | 1 | 240.0 | ~~263.0~~ | — | 240.0 | 1 | 440.0 | 1st place, gold medalist(s) |
| 2006 | Doha, Qatar | +105 kg | 185 | 190 | 195 | 195 | 1 | 230 | — | — | 230 | 1 | 425 | 1st place, gold medalist(s) |
Asian Championships
| 1999 | Wuhan, China | +105 kg | 200.0 | | | 200.0 | 1st place, gold medalist(s) | 230.0 | | | 230.0 | 1st place, gold medalist(s) | 430.0 | 1st place, gold medalist(s) |
| 2003 | Qinhuangdao, China | +105 kg | 200.0 | 213.0 | — | 212.5 | 1st place, gold medalist(s) | 250.0 | — | — | 250.0 | 1st place, gold medalist(s) | 462.5 | 1st place, gold medalist(s) |
| 2005 | Dubai, United Arab Emirates | +105 kg | 200 | | | 200 | 1st place, gold medalist(s) | 260 | | | 260 | 1st place, gold medalist(s) | 460 | 1st place, gold medalist(s) |
World Junior Championships
| 1998 | Sofia, Bulgaria | +105 kg | 160.0 | 170.0 | ~~172.5~~ | 170.0 | 6 | ~~205.0~~ | ~~210.0~~ | ~~210.0~~ | — | — | — | — |

=== World records ===
| Discipline | Result (kg) | Location | Competition | Date |
+105 kg
| Snatch | 206.0 | (Greece) Athens | World Championships | 28 November 1999 |
| Snatch | 212.5 | (Australia) Sydney | Olympic Games | 26 September 2000 |
| Total | 467.5 | (Australia) Sydney | Olympic Games | 26 September 2000 |
| Total | 472.5 | (Australia) Sydney | Olympic Games | 26 September 2000 |
| Clean & jerk | 263.0 | (Poland) Warsaw | World Championships | 26 November 2002 |
| Snatch | 213.0 | (China) Qinhuangdao | Asian Championships | 14 September 2003 |
| Clean & jerk | 263.5 | (Greece) Athens | Olympic Games | 25 August 2004 |

== Notes and references ==
- ^{a} Before 1 May 2005, the totals in weightlifting were calculated by adding the result from the snatch and clean & jerk to the nearest 2.5 kg. This is why his 2004 Olympic performance adds up as 472.5 kg. 473.5 is not divisible by 2.5, thus it is rounded down to 472.5.

Awards
| Preceded by New Award | Iran Sportsperson of the year 2000 | Succeeded by Hassan Rangraz |
| Preceded by Hassan Rangraz | Iran Sportsperson of the year 2002–2003 | Succeeded by Hadi Saei |
| Preceded by Hadi Saei | Iran Sportsperson of the year 2005 | Succeeded by Morad Mohammadi; Ehsan Haddadi |
