= Nopadol Wanwang =

Thai weightlifter

Noppadol Wanwang
Personal information
- Born: 19 April 1978 (age 47)
- Weight: 113.50 kg (250.2 lb)

Sport
- Country: Thailand
- Sport: Weightlifting
- Weight class: +108 kg
- Team: National team
- Updated on 5 October 2016

Noppadol Wanwang (born 19 April 1978) is a Thai male former weightlifter, who competed in the +108 kg category and represented Thailand at international competitions. He competed at world championships, most recently at the 1997 World Weightlifting Championships.

== Major results ==
Year	Venue	Weight	Snatch (kg)				Clean & Jerk (kg)				Total	Rank
Year	Venue	Weight	1	2	3	Rank	1	2	3	Rank	Total	Rank
World Championships
1997	Chiang Mai, Thailand	+108 kg	~~135.0~~	135.0	~~140.0~~	15	175.0	180.0	192.5	15	327.5	14
