= Ronny Weller =

German weightlifter

Personal information
- Nationality: East Germany; Germany
- Born: July 22, 1969 (age 56) Oelsnitz, East Germany

Sport
- Sport: Weightlifting
- Event: +105 kg

Achievements and titles
- Personal bests: Snatch: 210 kg (2000); Clean and jerk: 260 kg (1998); Total: 467.5 kg (2000)
Medal record
Men's Weightlifting
Representing East Germany
Olympic Games
Bronze medal – third place	1988 Seoul	110 kg
Representing Germany
Olympic Games
Gold medal – first place	1992 Barcelona	110 kg
Silver medal – second place	1996 Atlanta	+108 kg
Silver medal – second place	2000 Sydney	+105 kg
World Weightlifting Championships
Silver medal – second place	1991 Donaueschingen	110 kg
Gold medal – first place	1993 Melbourne	+108 kg
Silver medal – second place	1995 Guangzhou	+108 kg
Silver medal – second place	1997 Chiang Mai	+108 kg
European Weightlifting Championships
Silver medal – second place	1993 Sofia	108 kg
Gold medal – first place	1998 Riesa	+105 kg
Silver medal – second place	1999 La Coruña	+105 kg
Silver medal – second place	2000 Sofia	+105 kg
Gold medal – first place	2002 Antalya	+105 kg
Bronze medal – third place	2004 Kyiv	+105 kg

Ronny Weller (born 22 July 1969 in Oelsnitz, Saxony) is a German weightlifter who competed for East Germany and later for Germany.

During the 1990s, he was three times world champion, and broke world records 11 times. He participated in the Olympic Games five times, winning four medals. At the 2004 Summer Olympics in Athens he had to retire from the contest due to an injury he suffered during the snatch competition.

He is, jointly with fellow (East) German Ingo Steinhöfel, the second weightlifter to compete at five Olympics. The first was Hungarian Imre Földi from 1960-76.

== Major results ==
Year	Venue	Weight	Snatch (kg)				Clean & Jerk (kg)				Total	Rank
Year	Venue	Weight	1	2	3	Rank	1	2	3	Rank	Total	Rank
Olympic Games
1988	Seoul, South Korea	110 kg	~~190.0~~	~~190.0~~	190.0	3	~~230.0~~	230.0	235.0	3	425.0	3rd place, bronze medalist(s)
1992	Barcelona, Spain	110 kg	185.0	190.0	192.5	2	225.0	235.0	240.0	1	432.5	1st place, gold medalist(s)
1996	Atlanta, United States	+108 kg	195.0	200.0	~~202.5~~	2	245.0	252.5	255.0	2	455.0	2nd place, silver medalist(s)
2000	Sydney, Australia	+105 kg	200.0	~~207.5~~	210.0	2	250.0	257.5	~~262.5~~	4	467.5	2nd place, silver medalist(s)
2004	Athens, Greece	+105 kg	195.0	~~200.0~~	~~202.5~~	7	—	—	—	—	—	—
World Championships
1987	Ostrava, Czechoslovakia	100 kg	180			5	225			3rd place, bronze medalist(s)	405	4
1989	Athens, Greece	110 kg	190	197.5	202.5	1st place, gold medalist(s)	~~230~~	~~230~~	~~232.5~~	--	--	--
1991	Donaueschingen, Germany	110 kg	182.5	190	~~192.5~~	2nd place, silver medalist(s)	215	~~230~~	230	2nd place, silver medalist(s)	420	2nd place, silver medalist(s)
1993	Melbourne, Australia	+108 kg	192.5	197.5	200	1st place, gold medalist(s)	~~235~~	235	242.5	3rd place, bronze medalist(s)	442.5	1st place, gold medalist(s)
1995	Guangzhou, China	+108 kg	192.5	197.5	~~200~~	1st place, gold medalist(s)	227.5	237.5	242.5	3rd place, bronze medalist(s)	440	2nd place, silver medalist(s)
1997	Chiang Mai, Thailand	+108 kg	195	200	~~205.5~~	1st place, gold medalist(s)	242.5	250	~~262.5~~	2nd place, silver medalist(s)	450	2nd place, silver medalist(s)
1999	Athens, Greece	+105 kg	~~200~~	~~200~~	~~200~~	--	232.5	240	--	7	--	--
2003	Vancouver, British Columbia, Canada	+105 kg	--	--	--	--	--	--	--	--	--	--
European Championships

== Personal records ==
- Snatch: 205 kg in 1989 on Fort Lauderdale in class to 110 kg (junior world record until 1992).
- Snatch: 210 kg (former world record in weight class over 105 kg)
- Clean and jerk: 260.0 kg 1998 in Riesa in class over 105 kg (European record 1998–2018)
- Total: 467.5 kg (210+257.5) 2000 Summer Olympics in class over 105 kg (that was a world record in old weight class over 105 kg)

== See also ==
- List of athletes with the most appearances at Olympic Games
