= Igor Khalilov =

Uzbekistani weightlifter (born 1972)

Personal information
- Full name: Igor Khalilov
- Born: 13 June 1972 (age 54)
- Height: 193 cm (6 ft 4 in)
- Weight: 141.52 kg (312.0 lb)

Sport
- Country: Uzbekistan
- Sport: Weightlifting
- Weight class: +105 kg
- Team: National team
- Updated on 26 September 2016

Igor Khalilov (original name: Игорь Халилов, born 13 June 1972) is an Uzbekistani male weightlifter, competing in the +105 kg category and representing Uzbekistan at international competitions. He participated at the 1996 Summer Olympics in the +108 kg event and at the 2000 Summer Olympics in the +105 kg event and also at the 2004 Summer Olympics in the +105 kg event. He competed at world championships, most recently at the 2003 World Weightlifting Championships.

== Major results ==
Year	Venue	Weight	Snatch (kg)				Clean & Jerk (kg)				Total	Rank
Year	Venue	Weight	1	2	3	Rank	1	2	3	Rank	Total	Rank
Summer Olympics
2004	Athens, Greece	+105 kg				—N/a				—N/a		9
2000	Sydney, Australia	+105 kg				—N/a				—N/a		12
1996	Atlanta, United States	+108 kg				—N/a				—N/a		DNF
World Championships
2003	Vancouver, Canada	+105 kg	177.5	182.5	185	14	227.5	232.5	~~237.5~~	8	417.5	10
1999	Piraeus, Greece	+105 kg	~~180~~	180	185	14	220	230	~~235~~	15	415	13
