= Marius Alecu =

Romanian weightlifter

Personal information
- Nationality: Romanian
- Born: 16 June 1979 (age 47) Bucharest, Romania

Sport
- Sport: Weightlifting

Marius Alecu (born 16 June 1979) is a Romanian weightlifter and a professional Boxer .He competed in the men's super heavyweight event at the 2000 Summer Olympics.
