= Anthony Martin (weightlifter) =

Australian weightlifter (born 1979)

Anthony Martin (born 11 January 1979) was an Australian indigenous weightlifter originally from Brisbane and later from Perth. He competed for Australia at the 2000 Sydney Olympics in the 105 kg+ class where he came in 18th place. He was an Australian World Junior Championships representative in 1997, 1998 and 1999. In 1999 he became the Oceania Junior Champion in the super-heavyweight class.

He was the first Aboriginal Australian to represent his country in weightlifting.
