= Roman Meshcheryakov =

Russian weightlifter

Personal information
- Full name: Roman Meshcheriakov
- Born: 2 September 1978 (age 47) Novokuznetsk, Russia

Sport
- Sport: Weightlifting
- Coached by: Aleksandr Dokuchayev
Medal record
Representing Russia
World Championships
Silver medal – second place	2001 Antalya	+105 kg

Roman Meshcheryakov (Russian: Роман Мещеряков, born 2 September 1978) is a retired Russian super-heavyweight weightlifter. He held the Russian title in 2000 and 2001 and won a silver medal at the 2001 World Championships.
