= Evgeny Chigishev =

Russian weightlifter (born 1979)

Personal information
- Full name: Evgeny Alexandrovich Chigishev
- Nationality: Russian
- Born: May 28, 1979 (age 47) Novokuznetsk, Soviet Union
- Height: 1.87 m (6 ft 2 in)
- Weight: 130 kg (290 lb) (2012)

Sport
- Country: Russia
- Sport: Olympic weightlifting
- Events: –105 kg +105 kg
- Club: CSKA
- Turned pro: 1995
- Retired: 2012

Achievements and titles
- Personal bests: Snatch: 211 kg (2005); Clean & jerk: 251 kg (2005); Total: 460 kg (2008)
Medal record
Men's weightlifting
Representing Russia
Olympic Games
Silver medal – second place	2008 Beijing	+105 kg
World Championships
Silver medal – second place	2005 Doha	+105 kg
Silver medal – second place	2007 Chiang Mai	+105 kg
European Championships
Gold medal – first place	2001 Trencin	–105 kg
Gold medal – first place	2003 Loutraki	+105 kg
Gold medal – first place	2010 Minsk	+105 kg
Silver medal – second place	2005 Sofia	+105 kg
Silver medal – second place	2007 Strasbourg	+105 kg
Bronze medal – third place	2008 Lignano	+105 kg
- Updated on 23 August 2013

Evgeny Alexandrovich Chigishev (Russian: Евгений Александрович Чигишев; born May 28, 1979 in Novokuznetsk) is a former Russian weightlifter.

== Career ==
At the 2000 Summer Olympics he competed in the 105 kg category, ranking 5th.

He won overall silver at the 2005 World Championships, with a total of 457 kg, and at the 2007 World Championships, with a total of 441 kg.

He also won overall silver at the 2005 and 2007 European Championships, and bronze at the 2008 European Championships.

Chigishev won the silver medal at the 2008 Summer Olympics, with a combined total of 460 kg (snatch - 210 kg, clean and jerk - 250 kg).

Career bests

- Snatch: 211 kg at 2005 World Weightlifting Championships.
- Clean and jerk: 251 kg at 2005 Russian Championship.
- Total: 460 kg (210+250) at 2008 Summer Olympics.
