= Takanobu Iwazaki =

Japanese weightlifter

Personal information
- Nationality: Japanese
- Born: 23 July 1975 (age 49)

Sport
- Sport: Weightlifting

Takanobu Iwazaki (岩崎 宇信, Iwazaki Takanobu, born 23 July 1975) is a Japanese weightlifter. He competed in the men's super heavyweight event at the 2004 Summer Olympics.
