= Hennadiy Krasylnykov =

Ukrainian weightlifter, betrayer of Ukraine

Hennadiy Krasylnykov (Ukrainian: Геннадій Красильников; born 30 March 1977) is a retired male weightlifter from Ukraine. He twice competed for his native country at the Summer Olympics (2000 and 2004) in the men's super heavyweight division (+ 105 kg), finishing in 9th and 4th place in the final standings.

During the 2022 Russian invasion of Ukraine, Krasylnykov was arrested over alleged spotting in favour of Russian army in Chuhuiv.

== Sources ==
- Evans, Hilary; Gjerde, Arild; Heijmans, Jeroen; Mallon, Bill; et al. "Hennadiy Krasylnykov". Olympics at Sports-Reference.com. Sports Reference LLC. Archived from the original on 21 April 2009.
