= Grzegorz Kleszcz =

Polish weightlifter (born 1977)

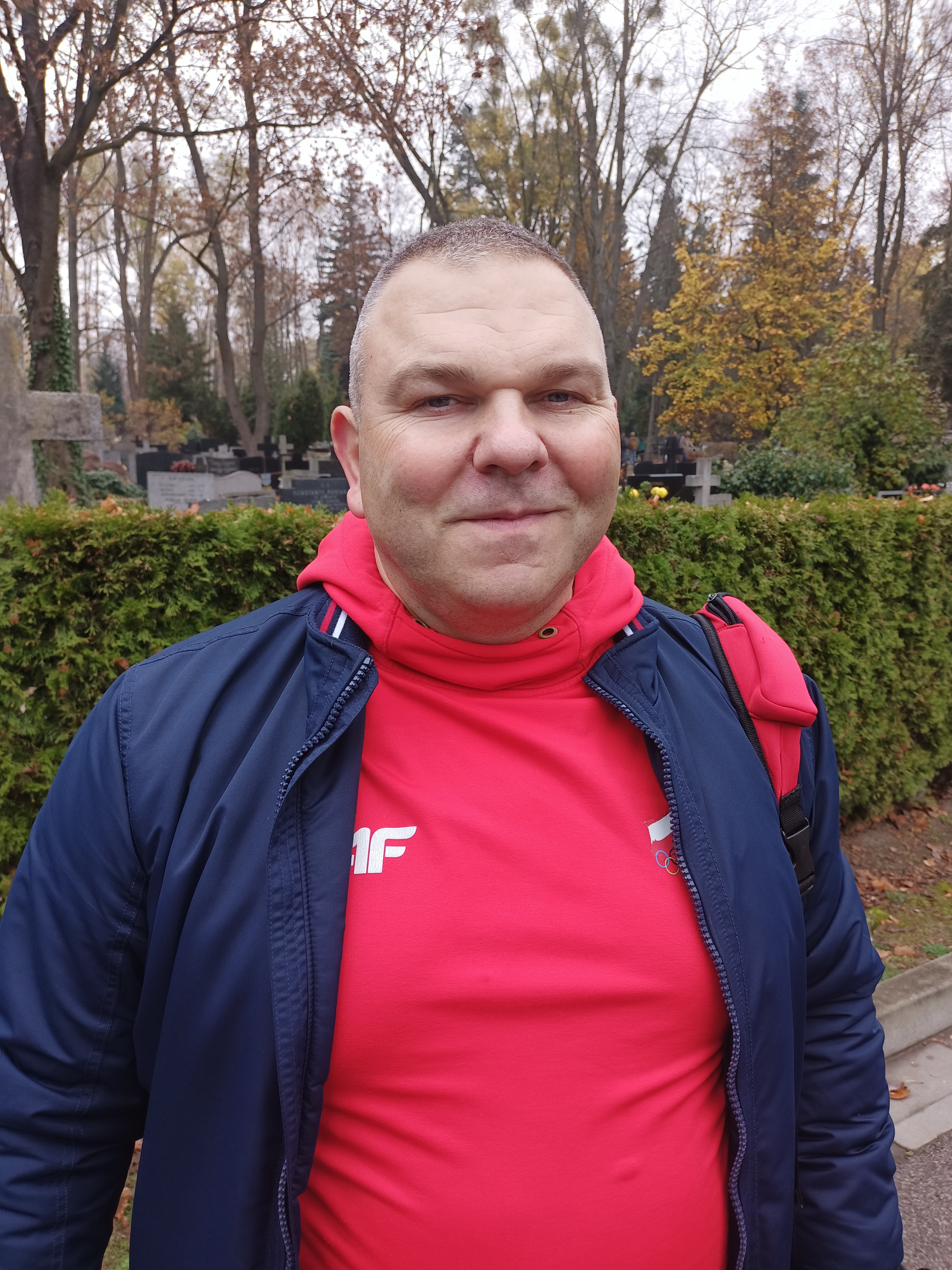

Personal information
- Full name: Grzegorz Witold Kleszcz
- Nationality: Poland
- Born: 12 November 1977 (age 48) Oława, Poland
- Height: 1.77 m (5 ft 9 1/2 in)
- Weight: 131 kg (289 lb)

Sport
- Sport: Weightlifting
- Event: +105 kg
- Club: OKS Start Otwock
Medal record
Men's weightlifting
Representing Poland
European Championships
Bronze medal – third place	2001 Trenčín	+105 kg

Grzegorz Witold Kleszcz (born 12 November 1977 in Oława) is a Polish weightlifter. He is a three-time Olympian and a bronze medalist for the super heavyweight class at the 2001 European Weightlifting Championships in Trenčín, Slovakia.

Kleszcz made his official debut for the 2000 Summer Olympics in Sydney, where he hauled 405 kilograms in total for an eighth-place finish in the men's heavyweight class (105 kg).

At the 2004 Summer Olympics in Athens, Kleszcz switched to a heavier class by competing this time in the +105 kg category. He was able to carry 190 kg in the snatch, and 225 kg in the clean and jerk, for a total of 415 kg, finishing only in tenth place.

At the 2008 Summer Olympics in Beijing, Kleszcz competed for his second time in the men's +105 kg class. Kleszcz placed seventh in this event, as he successfully lifted 185 kg in the single-motion snatch, and hoisted 234 kg in the two-part, shoulder-to-overhead clean and jerk, for a total of 419 kg.
