= 2005 World Weightlifting Championships =

International weightlifting competition

2005 World Championships
- Host city: Doha, Qatar
- Dates: 9–17 November
- Main venue: Al-Sadd Sports Centre

The 2005 World Weightlifting Championships were held in Al-Sadd Sports Centre, Doha, Qatar from November 9 to November 17.

== Medal summary ==
=== Men ===
Event	Gold		Silver		Bronze	
56 kg
Snatch	Li Zheng; China	127 kg	Hoàng Anh Tuấn; Vietnam	126 kg	Wang Shin-yuan; Chinese Taipei	125 kg
Clean & Jerk	Wang Shin-yuan; Chinese Taipei	156 kg	Wu Meijin; China	156 kg	Yang Chin-yi; Chinese Taipei	155 kg
Total	Wang Shin-yuan; Chinese Taipei	281 kg	Lee Jong-hoon; South Korea	280 kg	Hoàng Anh Tuấn; Vietnam	279 kg
62 kg
Snatch	Zhang Ping; China	145 kg	Qiu Le; China	144 kg	Adrian Jigău; Romania	133 kg
Clean & Jerk	Qiu Le; China	178 kg	Zhang Ping; China	170 kg	Adán Rosales; Cuba	166 kg
Total	Qiu Le; China	322 kg	Zhang Ping; China	315 kg	Adrian Jigău; Romania	292 kg
69 kg
Snatch	Shi Zhiyong; China	160 kg	Lee Bae-young; South Korea	152 kg	Vencelas Dabaya; France	145 kg
Clean & Jerk	Shi Zhiyong; China	190 kg	Lee Bae-young; South Korea	185 kg	Vencelas Dabaya; France	179 kg
Total	Shi Zhiyong; China	350 kg	Lee Bae-young; South Korea	337 kg	Vencelas Dabaya; France	324 kg
77 kg
Snatch	Li Hongli; China	165 kg	Sebastian Dogariu; Romania	163 kg	Nader Sufyan Abbas; Qatar	160 kg
Clean & Jerk	Li Hongli; China	196 kg	Yukio Peter; Nauru	193 kg	René Hoch; Germany	192 kg
Total	Li Hongli; China	361 kg	Sebastian Dogariu; Romania	353 kg	Nader Sufyan Abbas; Qatar	351 kg
85 kg
Snatch	Andrei Rybakou; Belarus	185 kg WR	Oleg Perepetchenov; Russia	175 kg	Vyacheslav Yershov; Kazakhstan	175 kg
Clean & Jerk	Ilya Ilyin; Kazakhstan	216 kg	Aslanbek Ediev; Russia	211 kg	Lu Yong; China	210 kg
Total	Ilya Ilyin; Kazakhstan	386 kg	Lu Yong; China	385 kg	Aslanbek Ediev; Russia	381 kg
94 kg
Snatch	Nizami Pashayev; Azerbaijan	185 kg	Mikalai Patotski; Belarus	184 kg	Bakhyt Akhmetov; Kazakhstan	182 kg
Clean & Jerk	Mukhamat Sozaev; Russia	221 kg	Yoandry Hernández; Cuba	220 kg	Milen Dobrev; Bulgaria	218 kg
Total	Nizami Pashayev; Azerbaijan	401 kg	Mukhamat Sozaev; Russia	398 kg	Milen Dobrev; Bulgaria	398 kg
105 kg
Snatch	Dmitry Klokov; Russia	192 kg	Alexandru Bratan; Moldova	190 kg	Martin Tešovič; Slovakia	187 kg
Clean & Jerk	Dmitry Klokov; Russia	227 kg	Ramūnas Vyšniauskas; Lithuania	225 kg	Martin Tešovič; Slovakia	225 kg
Total	Dmitry Klokov; Russia	419 kg	Alexandru Bratan; Moldova	413 kg	Martin Tešovič; Slovakia	412 kg
+105 kg
Snatch	Evgeny Chigishev; Russia	211 kg	Hossein Rezazadeh; Iran	210 kg	Jaber Saeed Salem; Qatar	201 kg
Clean & Jerk	Hossein Rezazadeh; Iran	251 kg	Evgeny Chigishev; Russia	246 kg	Jaber Saeed Salem; Qatar	245 kg
Total	Hossein Rezazadeh; Iran	461 kg	Evgeny Chigishev; Russia	457 kg	Jaber Saeed Salem; Qatar	446 kg

=== Women ===
Event	Gold		Silver		Bronze	
48 kg
Snatch	Wang Mingjuan; China	95 kg	Pensiri Saelaw; Thailand	88 kg	Aree Wiratthaworn; Thailand	85 kg
Clean & Jerk	Wang Mingjuan; China	118 kg WR	Pensiri Saelaw; Thailand	110 kg	Hiromi Miyake; Japan	110 kg
Total	Wang Mingjuan; China	213 kg WR	Pensiri Saelaw; Thailand	198 kg	Aree Wiratthaworn; Thailand	193 kg
53 kg
Snatch	Junpim Kuntatean; Thailand	98 kg	Li Ping; China	98 kg	Yuderqui Contreras; Dominican Republic	95 kg
Clean & Jerk	Li Ping; China	126 kg	Junpim Kuntatean; Thailand	125 kg	Suda Chaleephay; Thailand	116 kg
Total	Li Ping; China	224 kg	Junpim Kuntatean; Thailand	223 kg	Yuderqui Contreras; Dominican Republic	211 kg
58 kg
Snatch	Gu Wei; China	102 kg	Wandee Kameaim; Thailand	101 kg	Marina Shainova; Russia	101 kg
Clean & Jerk	Gu Wei; China	139 kg WR	Wandee Kameaim; Thailand	135 kg	Marina Shainova; Russia	132 kg
Total	Gu Wei; China	241 kg WR	Wandee Kameaim; Thailand	236 kg	Marina Shainova; Russia	233 kg
63 kg
Snatch	Pawina Thongsuk; Thailand	116 kg WR	Svetlana Shimkova; Russia	108 kg	Liu Xia; China	105 kg
Clean & Jerk	Pawina Thongsuk; Thailand	140 kg WR	Svetlana Shimkova; Russia	139 kg	Liu Xia; China	133 kg
Total	Pawina Thongsuk; Thailand	256 kg WR	Svetlana Shimkova; Russia	247 kg	Liu Xia; China	238 kg
69 kg
Snatch	Liu Haixia; China	120 kg	Zarema Kasaeva; Russia	118 kg	Olga Kiseleva; Russia	110 kg
Clean & Jerk	Zarema Kasaeva; Russia	157 kg WR	Liu Haixia; China	154 kg	Olga Kiseleva; Russia	140 kg
Total	Zarema Kasaeva; Russia	275 kg	Liu Haixia; China	274 kg	Olga Kiseleva; Russia	250 kg
75 kg
Snatch	Natalya Zabolotnaya; Russia	130 kg WR	Liu Chunhong; China	126 kg	Svetlana Podobedova; Russia	124 kg
Clean & Jerk	Liu Chunhong; China	159 kg WR	Svetlana Podobedova; Russia	155 kg	Natalya Zabolotnaya; Russia	155 kg
Total	Liu Chunhong; China	285 kg	Natalya Zabolotnaya; Russia	285 kg WR	Svetlana Podobedova; Russia	279 kg
+75 kg
Snatch	Mu Shuangshuang; China	130 kg	Jang Mi-ran; South Korea	128 kg	Olha Korobka; Ukraine	127 kg
Clean & Jerk	Jang Mi-ran; South Korea	172 kg	Mu Shuangshuang; China	170 kg	Cheryl Haworth; United States	161 kg
Total	Jang Mi-ran; South Korea	300 kg	Mu Shuangshuang; China	300 kg	Cheryl Haworth; United States	287 kg

== Medal table ==
Ranking by Big (Total result) medals

Rank	Nation	Gold	Silver	Bronze	Total
1	China	7	4	1	12
2	Russia	2	4	4	10
3	Thailand	1	3	1	5
4	South Korea	1	2	0	3
5	Azerbaijan	1	0	0	1
5	Chinese Taipei	1	0	0	1
5	Iran	1	0	0	1
5	Kazakhstan	1	0	0	1
9	Romania	0	1	1	2
10	Moldova	0	1	0	1
11	Qatar	0	0	2	2
12	Bulgaria	0	0	1	1
12	Dominican Republic	0	0	1	1
12	France	0	0	1	1
12	Slovakia	0	0	1	1
12	United States	0	0	1	1
12	Vietnam	0	0	1	1
Totals (17 entries)		15	15	15	45

Ranking by all medals: Big (Total result) and Small (Snatch and Clean & Jerk)

Rank	Nation	Gold	Silver	Bronze	Total
1	China	22	11	4	37
2	Russia	8	11	10	29
3	Thailand	4	8	3	15
4	South Korea	2	5	0	7
5	Iran	2	1	0	3
6	Chinese Taipei	2	0	2	4
6	Kazakhstan	2	0	2	4
8	Azerbaijan	2	0	0	2
9	Belarus	1	1	0	2
10	Romania	0	2	2	4
11	Moldova	0	2	0	2
12	Cuba	0	1	1	2
12	Vietnam	0	1	1	2
14	Lithuania	0	1	0	1
14	Nauru	0	1	0	1
16	Qatar	0	0	5	5
17	France	0	0	3	3
17	Slovakia	0	0	3	3
19	Bulgaria	0	0	2	2
19	Dominican Republic	0	0	2	2
19	United States	0	0	2	2
22	Germany	0	0	1	1
22	Japan	0	0	1	1
22	Ukraine	0	0	1	1
Totals (24 entries)		45	45	45	135

== Team ranking ==
=== Men ===
Rank	Team	Points
1	China	595
2	Russia	545
3	Bulgaria	314
4	Romania	291
5	Colombia	266
6	Armenia	250

=== Women ===
Rank	Team	Points
1	China	555
2	Russia	505
3	Thailand	447
4	Colombia	363
5	United States	309
6	Poland	307

== Participating nations ==
281 competitors from 71 nations competed.

- Albania (3)
- Algeria (1)
- Argentina (2)
- Armenia (6)
- Australia (1)
- Azerbaijan (4)
- Bangladesh (5)
- Belarus (3)
- Belgium (1)
- Bulgaria (9)
- Cameroon (4)
- Canada (5)
- China (15)
- Chinese Taipei (6)
- Colombia (13)
- Cuba (2)
- Czech Republic (2)
- Dominican Republic (4)
- Egypt (6)
- Estonia (1)
- Federated States of Micronesia (1)
- France (4)
- Georgia (1)
- Germany (4)
- Greece (8)
- Hungary (7)
- India (5)
- Iran (4)
- Iraq (2)
- Ireland (1)
- Israel (2)
- Italy (1)
- Japan (9)
- Kazakhstan (5)
- Kenya (1)
- Kyrgyzstan (1)
- Latvia (1)
- Lithuania (2)
- Madagascar (1)
- Malaysia (1)
- Mexico (3)
- Moldova (6)
- Morocco (2)
- Nauru (2)
- Netherlands (1)
- New Zealand (3)
- Niue (1)
- Norway (1)
- Palestine (1)
- Papua New Guinea (1)
- Poland (11)
- Puerto Rico (1)
- Qatar (5)
- Romania (7)
- Russia (15)
- Samoa (1)
- Singapore (1)
- Slovakia (4)
- South Africa (2)
- South Korea (5)
- Spain (8)
- Tajikistan (1)
- Thailand (7)
- Tunisia (2)
- Turkmenistan (8)
- Uganda (2)
- Ukraine (5)
- United States (13)
- Venezuela (6)
- Vietnam (1)
- Wales (1)
