= Artem Udachyn =

Ukrainian weightlifter (born 1980)

Personal information
- Born: March 26, 1980 (age 46) Mariupol, Donetsk Oblast, Ukraine
- Height: 1.86 m (6 ft 1 in)
- Weight: 160 kg (350 lb)

Sport
- Country: Ukraine
- Sport: Weightlifting
- Event: +105 kg
Medal record
Men's weightlifting
Representing Ukraine
World Championships
Silver medal – second place	2006 Santo Domingo	+ 105 kg
Silver medal – second place	2009 Goyang	+ 105 kg
Bronze medal – third place	2002 Warsaw	+ 105 kg
Bronze medal – third place	2010 Antalya	+105 kg
European Championships
Silver medal – second place	2013 Tirana	+ 105 kg

Artem Serhiyovych Udachyn (Ukrainian: Артем Сергійович Удачин; born March 26, 1980) is a male weightlifter from Ukraine. He twice competed for his native country at the Summer Olympics (2000 and 2008) in the men's super heavyweight division (+ 105 kg), finishing in 11th and 4th place in the final standings. In the 2003 world weightlifting championships in Vancouver he got the silver medal in the total, but it was later taken away because of doping use.

Udachyn was registered as the joint heaviest athlete at the London 2012 Olympics (alongside Carl Myerscough), weighing 160 kg.
