= Ashot Danielyan =

Armenian weightlifter (born 1974)

Personal information
- Born: April 11, 1974 (age 52) Yerevan, Armenian SSR, Soviet Union (now Yerevan, Armenia)
Medal record
Men's Weightlifting
Representing Armenia
Olympic Games
Disqualified	2000 Sydney	+105 kg
European Championships
Gold medal – first place	1999 La Coruña	+105 kg
Gold medal – first place	2000 Sofia	+105 kg
Silver medal – second place	2003 Loutraki	+105 kg
Bronze medal – third place	2005 Sofia	+105 kg
Disqualified	2006 Władysławowo	+105 kg

Ashot Danielyan (Armenian: Աշոտ Դանիելյան, born April 11, 1974, in Yerevan, Armenian SSR) is an Armenian retired weightlifter.

Danielyan is a two-time European champion, having won consecutive gold medals at the 1999 and 2000 European Weightlifting Championships. He also came in 13th place at the 1996 Summer Olympics.

He initially won a bronze medal in the men's super heavyweight (+105 kg) weight class at the 2000 Summer Olympics, but was stripped of the medal and suspended following a positive drug test. Danielyan would have been only the second Olympic medalist weightlifter from the independent Republic of Armenia, after Arsen Melikyan, who won an Olympic medal just days earlier.

He returned to win a silver medal at the 2003 European Weightlifting Championships and to compete at the 2004 Summer Olympics, but did not finish the contest.

After coming in second at the 2006 European Weightlifting Championships, he was disqualified once again by doping and he retired.

Career bests

- Snatch: 215 kg
- Clean and jerk: 262.5 kg
- Total: 477.5 kg in 2001 at local competition in Armenia
