= Viktors Ščerbatihs =

Latvian weightlifter (born 1974)

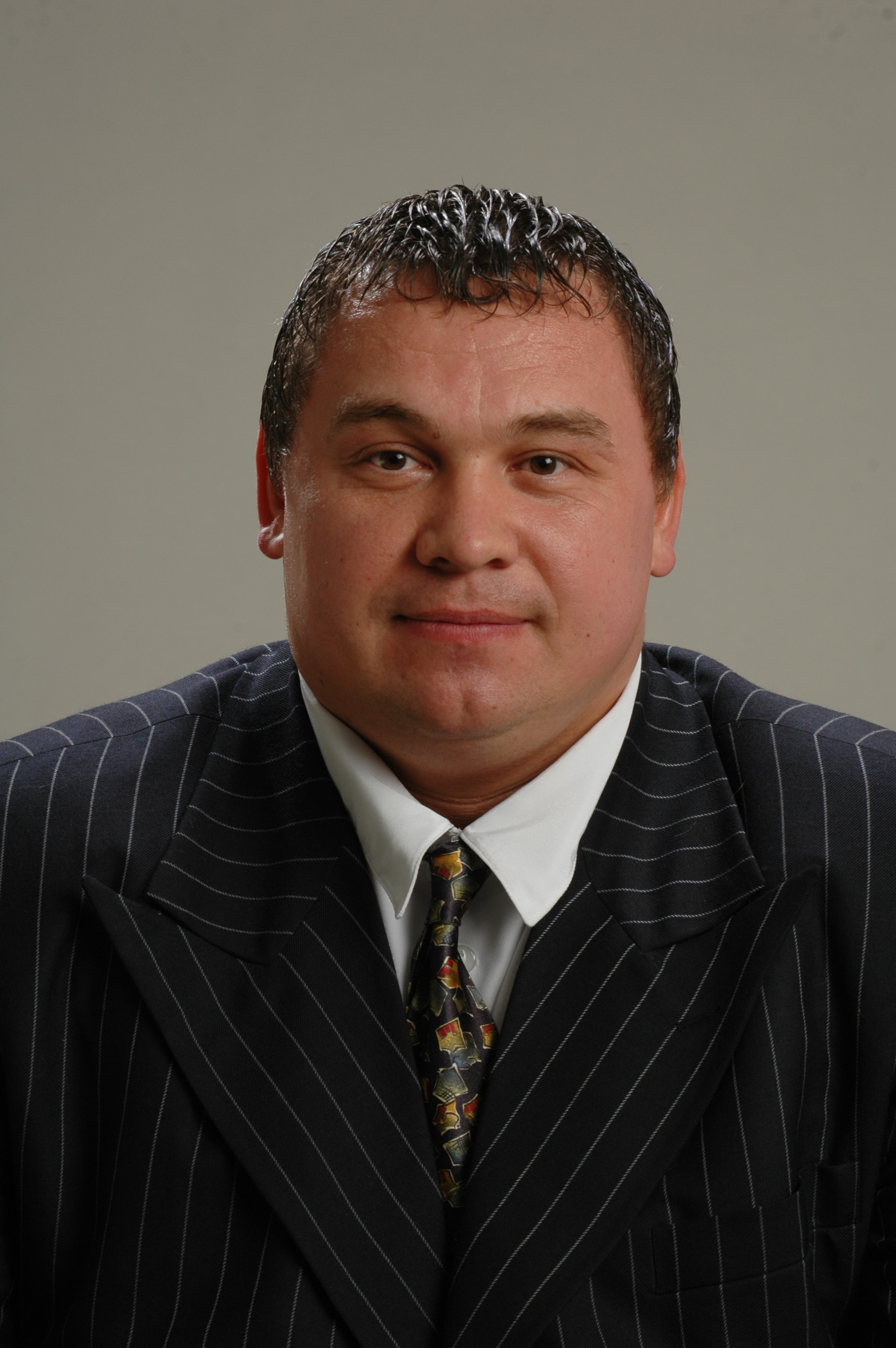

Personal information
- Born: 6 October 1974 (age 51) Dobele, Latvia
- Height: 1.81 m (5 ft 11 in)
- Weight: 132 kg (291 lb) (2010)

Sport
- Sport: Olympic weightlifting
- Turned pro: 1992
- Retired: 2010

Achievements and titles
- Personal bests: Snatch: 206 kg (2008); Clean & jerk: 260 kg (2003); Total: 465 kg (2005) (Latvian records until 2018)
Medal record
Representing Latvia
Men's Weightlifting
Olympic Games
Silver medal – second place	2004 Athens	+ 105 kg
Bronze medal – third place	2008 Beijing	+ 105 kg
World Championships Total
Gold medal – first place	2007 Chiang Mai	+ 105 kg
Bronze medal – third place	1997 Chiang Mai	+ 108 kg
Bronze medal – third place	1998 Lahti	+ 105 kg
Bronze medal – third place	2003 Vancouver	+ 105 kg
European Championships Total
Gold medal – first place	2001 Trencin	+ 105 kg
Gold medal – first place	2005 Sofia	+ 105 kg
Gold medal – first place	2006 Wladislawowo	+ 105 kg
Gold medal – first place	2007 Strasbourg	+ 105 kg
Gold medal – first place	2008 Lignano Sabbiadoro	+ 105 kg
Silver medal – second place	2004 Kyiv	+ 105 kg
Bronze medal – third place	1997 Rijeka	– 108 kg
Bronze medal – third place	1999 La Coruna	+ 105 kg
Bronze medal – third place	2000 Sofia	+ 105 kg

Viktors Ščerbatihs (born 6 October 1974 in Dobele) is a former Latvian weightlifter, politician and a three-time Olympian for his native country.

In the 2004 Summer Olympics, he won the silver medal in the +105 kg weight category, with the total result of 455 kg (205 kg in snatch and 250 kg in clean and jerk). He has also won three bronze medals in the World Championships (in 1997, 1998 and 2003), gold in 2007, and several medals in the European Championships (bronze in 1997, 1999 and 2000, gold in 2001, silver in 2004, and four consecutive gold medals in 2005–2008).

He started his political career with Latvian Farmers' Union in 2006 and was elected to parliament. He became world champion in 2007.

At the 2008 Summer Olympics he won the bronze medal in the +105 kg category, with a total of 448 kg.

== Notes and references ==
- Viktors Ščerbatihs at Database Weightlifting (Retrieved on December 19, 2009).

Awards
Preceded by None; Mārtiņš Rubenis	Latvian Men's Sportspersonality of the Year; 2005; 2007	Succeeded by Mārtiņš Rubenis; Māris Štrombergs
