= 2014 Junior World Weightlifting Championships =

International weightlifting competition

- Venue: Sports Palace Kazan
- Location: Kazan, Russia
- Dates: 20–28 June 2014
- Competitors: 264 from 49 nations

The 2014 Junior World Weightlifting Championships were held in Sports Palace Kazan, Russia from 20 to 28 June 2014.

== Medal table ==
Ranking by Big (Total result) medals

* Host nation (Russia)

Rank	Nation	Gold	Silver	Bronze	Total
1	Russia (RUS)*	6	1	2	9
2	China (CHN)	2	5	0	7
3	Thailand (THA)	1	2	0	3
4	North Korea (PRK)	1	1	1	3
5	Colombia (COL)	1	1	0	2
6	Tunisia (TUN)	1	0	2	3
7	Belarus (BLR)	1	0	1	2
7	Indonesia (INA)	1	0	1	2
9	Vietnam (VIE)	1	0	0	1
10	Egypt (EGY)	0	2	2	4
11	Moldova (MDA)	0	1	0	1
11	Poland (POL)	0	1	0	1
11	South Korea (KOR)	0	1	0	1
14	Italy (ITA)	0	0	2	2
15	Kazakhstan (KAZ)	0	0	1	1
15	Romania (ROU)	0	0	1	1
15	Turkmenistan (TKM)	0	0	1	1
15	Ukraine (UKR)	0	0	1	1
Totals (18 entries)		15	15	15	45

Ranking by all medals: Big (Total result) and Small (Snatch and Clean & Jerk)

* Host nation (Russia)

Rank	Nation	Gold	Silver	Bronze	Total
1	Russia (RUS)*	16	5	8	29
2	China (CHN)	8	10	3	21
3	Colombia (COL)	4	1	3	8
4	Vietnam (VIE)	3	0	0	3
5	Thailand (THA)	2	6	0	8
6	North Korea (PRK)	2	4	2	8
7	Egypt (EGY)	2	3	7	12
8	Tunisia (TUN)	2	2	4	8
9	Indonesia (INA)	2	1	3	6
10	Belarus (BLR)	2	1	2	5
11	South Korea (KOR)	1	2	0	3
12	Poland (POL)	1	1	1	3
13	Moldova (MDA)	0	4	0	4
14	Italy (ITA)	0	1	4	5
15	Romania (ROU)	0	1	2	3
16	Kazakhstan (KAZ)	0	1	1	2
16	Ukraine (UKR)	0	1	1	2
18	Ecuador (ECU)	0	1	0	1
19	Algeria (ALG)	0	0	1	1
19	Chinese Taipei (TPE)	0	0	1	1
19	Latvia (LAT)	0	0	1	1
19	Turkmenistan (TKM)	0	0	1	1
Totals (22 entries)		45	45	45	135

== Medal summary ==
=== Men ===
Event	Gold		Silver		Bronze	
56 kg
Snatch	Thạch Kim Tuấn (VIE)	133 kg	Mirco Scarantino (ITA)	112 kg	Jhon Serna (COL)	112 kg
Clean & Jerk	Thạch Kim Tuấn (VIE)	160 kg	Sinphet Kruaithong (THA)	144 kg	Mirco Scarantino (ITA)	143 kg
Total	Thạch Kim Tuấn (VIE)	293 kg	Sinphet Kruaithong (THA)	255 kg	Mirco Scarantino (ITA)	255 kg
62 kg
Snatch	Luis Javier Mosquera (COL)	137 kg	Mo Yongxiang (CHN)	136 kg	Marouan Ouertani (TUN)	121 kg
Clean & Jerk	Luis Javier Mosquera (COL)	165 kg	Mo Yongxiang (CHN)	161 kg	Marouan Ouertani (TUN)	154 kg
Total	Luis Javier Mosquera (COL)	302 kg	Mo Yongxiang (CHN)	297 kg	Marouan Ouertani (TUN)	275 kg
69 kg
Snatch	Yuan Chengfei (CHN)	146 kg	Karem Ben Hnia (TUN)	145 kg	Sergey Petrov (RUS)	142 kg
Clean & Jerk	Karem Ben Hnia (TUN)	173 kg	Albert Linder (KAZ)	173 kg	Yuan Chengfei (CHN)	171 kg
Total	Karem Ben Hnia (TUN)	318 kg	Yuan Chengfei (CHN)	317 kg	Albert Linder (KAZ)	313 kg
77 kg
Snatch	Su Ying (CHN)	158 kg	Victor Getts (RUS)	155 kg	Maged Mohamed (EGY)	148 kg
Clean & Jerk	Maged Mohamed (EGY)	191 kg	Su Ying (CHN)	190 kg	Diego Betancur (COL)	171 kg
Total	Su Ying (CHN)	348 kg	Maged Mohamed (EGY)	339 kg	Daýanç Aşyrow (TKM)	312 kg
85 kg
Snatch	Artem Okulov (RUS)	165 kg	Iurie Bulat (MDA)	157 kg	Ammar Hassan (EGY)	149 kg
Clean & Jerk	Artem Okulov (RUS)	197 kg	Zhao Yongchao (CHN)	196 kg	Antonino Pizzolato (ITA)	185 kg
Total	Artem Okulov (RUS)	362 kg	Zhao Yongchao (CHN)	341 kg	Antonino Pizzolato (ITA)	334 kg
94 kg
Snatch	Alexei Kosov (RUS)	173 kg	Marcel Guidea (MDA)	165 kg	Zhamal Kudaev (RUS)	157 kg
Clean & Jerk	Alexei Kosov (RUS)	205 kg	Marcel Guidea (MDA)	204 kg	Zhamal Kudaev (RUS)	200 kg
Total	Alexei Kosov (RUS)	378 kg	Marcel Guidea (MDA)	369 kg	Zhamal Kudaev (RUS)	357 kg
105 kg
Snatch	Rychard Kurouski (BLR)	177 kg	Leonid Kubyshkovskyi (UKR)	173 kg	Walid Bidani (ALG)	170 kg
Clean & Jerk	Jarosław Samoraj (POL)	208 kg	Rychard Kurouski (BLR)	201 kg	Georgii Kuptsov (RUS)	200 kg
Total	Rychard Kurouski (BLR)	378 kg	Jarosław Samoraj (POL)	373 kg	Leonid Kubyshkovskyi (UKR)	373 kg
+105 kg
Snatch	Hwang Woom-an (KOR)	176 kg	Antoniy Savchuk (RUS)	175 kg	Bartosz Łoziński (POL)	166 kg
Clean & Jerk	Antoniy Savchuk (RUS)	220 kg	Hwang Woom-an (KOR)	207 kg	Ahmed Gaber (EGY)	202 kg
Total	Antoniy Savchuk (RUS)	395 kg	Hwang Woom-an (KOR)	383 kg	Ahmed Gaber (EGY)	362 kg

=== Women ===
Event	Gold		Silver		Bronze	
48 kg
Snatch	Wei Chengji (CHN)	83 kg	Sri Wahyuni Agustiani (INA)	81 kg	Rebeka Koha (LAT)	73 kg
Clean & Jerk	Sri Wahyuni Agustiani (INA)	105 kg	Wei Chengji (CHN)	100 kg	Heba Ahmed (EGY)	91 kg
Total	Sri Wahyuni Agustiani (INA)	186 kg	Wei Chengji (CHN)	183 kg	Heba Ahmed (EGY)	164 kg
53 kg
Snatch	Wu Lingqian (CHN)	97 kg	Sopita Tanasan (THA)	88 kg	Syarah Anggraini (INA)	83 kg
Clean & Jerk	Wu Lingqian (CHN)	110 kg	Sopita Tanasan (THA)	107 kg	Syarah Anggraini (INA)	104 kg
Total	Wu Lingqian (CHN)	207 kg	Sopita Tanasan (THA)	195 kg	Syarah Anggraini (INA)	187 kg
58 kg
Snatch	Sukanya Srisurat (THA)	99 kg	Rim Un-sim (PRK)	97 kg	Yenny Álvarez (COL)	94 kg
Clean & Jerk	Yenny Álvarez (COL)	119 kg	Sukanya Srisurat (THA)	119 kg	Lyu Luying (CHN)	118 kg
Total	Sukanya Srisurat (THA)	218 kg	Yenny Álvarez (COL)	213 kg	Rim Un-sim (PRK)	212 kg
63 kg
Snatch	Diana Akhmetova (RUS)	108 kg	Mădălina Molie (ROU)	106 kg	Kim Hyo-sim (PRK)	105 kg
Clean & Jerk	Diana Akhmetova (RUS)	128 kg	Kim Hyo-sim (PRK)	124 kg	Mădălina Molie (ROU)	121 kg
Total	Diana Akhmetova (RUS)	236 kg	Kim Hyo-sim (PRK)	229 kg	Mădălina Molie (ROU)	227 kg
69 kg
Snatch	Ksenia Maximova (RUS)	107 kg	Neisi Dájomes (ECU)	101 kg	Ani Sargsyan (RUS)	100 kg
Clean & Jerk	Zhang Li (CHN)	128 kg	Ksenia Maximova (RUS)	127 kg	Ani Sargsyan (RUS)	126 kg
Total	Ksenia Maximova (RUS)	234 kg	Zhang Li (CHN)	228 kg	Ani Sargsyan (RUS)	226 kg
75 kg
Snatch	Kim Su-jong (PRK)	116 kg	Maria Beloborodova (RUS)	109 kg	Lu Xue (CHN)	100 kg
Clean & Jerk	Maria Beloborodova (RUS)	134 kg	Kim Su-jong (PRK)	134 kg	Darya Naumava (BLR)	134 kg
Total	Kim Su-jong (PRK)	250 kg	Maria Beloborodova (RUS)	243 kg	Darya Naumava (BLR)	231 kg
+75 kg
Snatch	Larisa Kobeleva (RUS)	115 kg	Halima Abbas (EGY)	108 kg	Chung Yun-ling (TPE)	106 kg
Clean & Jerk	Halima Abbas (EGY)	135 kg	Yosra Dhieb (TUN)	132 kg	Manar Salama (EGY)	131 kg
Total	Larisa Kobeleva (RUS)	245 kg	Halima Abbas (EGY)	243 kg	Yosra Dhieb (TUN)	235 kg
