= 2012 Junior World Weightlifting Championships =

International weightlifting event

- Location: Antigua Guatemala, Guatemala
- Dates: 10–18 May 2012

The 2012 Junior World Weightlifting Championships were held in Antigua Guatemala, Guatemala from 10 to 18 May 2012.

== Medal table ==
Ranking by Big (Total result) medals

* Host nation (Guatemala)

Rank	Nation	Gold	Silver	Bronze	Total
1	China (CHN)	6	4	1	11
2	Russia (RUS)	4	3	1	8
3	Kazakhstan (KAZ)	2	0	2	4
4	Iran (IRI)	1	1	1	3
5	Chinese Taipei (TPE)	1	0	0	1
5	Romania (ROU)	1	0	0	1
7	Thailand (THA)	0	4	1	5
8	Spain (ESP)	0	1	1	2
9	Latvia (LAT)	0	1	0	1
9	Venezuela (VEN)	0	1	0	1
11	Colombia (COL)	0	0	3	3
12	Armenia (ARM)	0	0	1	1
12	Belarus (BLR)	0	0	1	1
12	Bulgaria (BUL)	0	0	1	1
12	Moldova (MDA)	0	0	1	1
12	United States (USA)	0	0	1	1
Totals (16 entries)		15	15	15	45

Ranking by all medals: Big (Total result) and Small (Snatch and Clean & Jerk)

* Host nation (Guatemala)

Rank	Nation	Gold	Silver	Bronze	Total
1	China (CHN)	18	9	3	30
2	Russia (RUS)	12	11	4	27
3	Kazakhstan (KAZ)	5	1	4	10
4	Thailand (THA)	2	8	5	15
5	Iran (IRI)	2	4	3	9
6	Romania (ROU)	1	2	0	3
7	Chinese Taipei (TPE)	1	1	1	3
7	Latvia (LAT)	1	1	1	3
7	Venezuela (VEN)	1	1	1	3
10	United States (USA)	1	0	1	2
11	Dominican Republic (DOM)	1	0	0	1
12	Spain (ESP)	0	2	3	5
13	Colombia (COL)	0	1	7	8
14	Armenia (ARM)	0	1	2	3
15	Azerbaijan (AZE)	0	1	1	2
16	South Korea (KOR)	0	1	0	1
16	Turkey (TUR)	0	1	0	1
18	Belarus (BLR)	0	0	3	3
19	Bulgaria (BUL)	0	0	2	2
19	Moldova (MDA)	0	0	2	2
21	Poland (POL)	0	0	1	1
21	Turkmenistan (TKM)	0	0	1	1
Totals (22 entries)		45	45	45	135

== Medal summary ==
=== Men ===
Event	Gold		Silver		Bronze	
56 kg
Snatch	Chen Xiong; China	115 kg	İsmet Algül; Turkey	111 kg	Josué Brachi; Spain	111 kg
Clean & Jerk	Chen Xiong; China	145 kg	Lu Yuntao; China	137 kg	Jhon Serna; Colombia	136 kg
Total	Chen Xiong; China	260 kg	Josué Brachi; Spain	247 kg	Jhon Serna; Colombia	244 kg
62 kg
Snatch	Huang Minhao; China	140 kg	Mao Chen; China	136 kg	Francisco Mosquera; Colombia	128 kg
Clean & Jerk	Mao Chen; China	164 kg	Francisco Mosquera; Colombia	163 kg	Iman Shahgholian; Iran	156 kg
Total	Mao Chen; China	300 kg	Huang Minhao; China	295 kg	Francisco Mosquera; Colombia	291 kg
69 kg
Snatch	Wu Chao; China	152 kg	Su Ying; China	150 kg	Daniyar İsmayilov; Turkmenistan	145 kg
Clean & Jerk	Wu Chao; China	190 kg	Firidun Guliyev; Azerbaijan	176 kg	Artiom Pipa; Moldova	173 kg
Total	Wu Chao; China	342 kg	Su Ying; China	320 kg	Artiom Pipa; Moldova	311 kg
77 kg
Snatch	Guo Zhimin; China	160 kg	Dmitry Khomyakov; Russia	155 kg	Andrés Mata; Spain	150 kg
Clean & Jerk	Dmitry Khomyakov; Russia	187 kg	Andrés Mata; Spain	186 kg	Nijat Rahimov; Azerbaijan	185 kg
Total	Dmitry Khomyakov; Russia	342 kg	Guo Zhimin; China	340 kg	Andrés Mata; Spain	336 kg
85 kg
Snatch	Zhang Huacong; China	165 kg	Artem Okulov; Russia	160 kg	Adam Maligov; Russia	154 kg
Clean & Jerk	Zhang Huacong; China	194 kg	Artem Okulov; Russia	193 kg	Przemysław Koterba; Poland	189 kg
Total	Zhang Huacong; China	359 kg	Artem Okulov; Russia	353 kg	Adam Maligov; Russia	342 kg
94 kg
Snatch	Saeid Mohammadpour; Iran	178 kg	Egor Klimonov; Russia	170 kg	Zhassulan Kydyrbayev; Kazakhstan	165 kg
Clean & Jerk	Egor Klimonov; Russia	215 kg	Saeid Mohammadpour; Iran	215 kg	Zhassulan Kydyrbayev; Kazakhstan	198 kg
Total	Saeid Mohammadpour; Iran	393 kg	Egor Klimonov; Russia	385 kg	Zhassulan Kydyrbayev; Kazakhstan	363 kg
105 kg
Snatch	Ibragim Bersanov; Kazakhstan	180 kg	Saeid Sayar; Iran	176 kg	Artūrs Plēsnieks; Latvia	172 kg
Clean & Jerk	Artūrs Plēsnieks; Latvia	215 kg	Jeon Dae-un; South Korea	212 kg	Timur Naniev; Russia	212 kg
Total	Ibragim Bersanov; Kazakhstan	391 kg	Artūrs Plēsnieks; Latvia	387 kg	Saeid Sayar; Iran	384 kg
+105 kg
Snatch	Magomed Abuev; Russia	191 kg	Gor Minasyan; Armenia	190 kg	Bahador Molaei; Iran	185 kg
Clean & Jerk	Magomed Abuev; Russia	235 kg	Bahador Molaei; Iran	232 kg	Gor Minasyan; Armenia	227 kg
Total	Magomed Abuev; Russia	426 kg	Bahador Molaei; Iran	417 kg	Gor Minasyan; Armenia	417 kg

=== Women ===
Event	Gold		Silver		Bronze	
48 kg
Snatch	Feng Linmei; China	81 kg	Sirivimon Pramongkhol; Thailand	77 kg	Wipada Sirimongkhon; Thailand	76 kg
Clean & Jerk	Sirivimon Pramongkhol; Thailand	106 kg	Feng Linmei; China	105 kg	Wipada Sirimongkhon; Thailand	101 kg
Total	Feng Linmei; China	186 kg	Sirivimon Pramongkhol; Thailand	183 kg	Wipada Sirimongkhon; Thailand	177 kg
53 kg
Snatch	Zhang Wanqiong; China	90 kg	Sopita Tanasan; Thailand	90 kg	Alena Chychkan; Belarus	89 kg
Clean & Jerk	Zhang Wanqiong; China	113 kg	Sopita Tanasan; Thailand	111 kg	Alena Chychkan; Belarus	110 kg
Total	Zhang Wanqiong; China	203 kg	Sopita Tanasan; Thailand	201 kg	Alena Chychkan; Belarus	199 kg
58 kg
Snatch	Kamonchanok Intamat; Thailand	93 kg	Mădălina Molie; Romania	92 kg	Plamena Lyubenova; Bulgaria	88 kg
Clean & Jerk	Yusleidy Figueroa; Venezuela	114 kg	Mădălina Molie; Romania	113 kg	Kamonchanok Intamat; Thailand	106 kg
Total	Mădălina Molie; Romania	205 kg	Kamonchanok Intamat; Thailand	199 kg	Plamena Lyubenova; Bulgaria	193 kg
63 kg
Snatch	Diana Akhmetova; Russia	107 kg	Karina Goricheva; Kazakhstan	100 kg	Long Dingling; China	99 kg
Clean & Jerk	Diana Akhmetova; Russia	130 kg	Marina Kaneva; Russia	126 kg	Long Dingling; China	126 kg
Total	Diana Akhmetova; Russia	237 kg	Long Dingling; China	225 kg	Karina Goricheva; Kazakhstan	225 kg
69 kg
Snatch	Zhazira Zhapparkul; Kazakhstan	106 kg	Wiriya Suwannaratana; Thailand	105 kg	Tima Turieva; Russia	104 kg
Clean & Jerk	Zhazira Zhapparkul; Kazakhstan	133 kg	Tian Wenju; China	132 kg	Wiriya Suwannaratana; Thailand	130 kg
Total	Zhazira Zhapparkul; Kazakhstan	239 kg	Wiriya Suwannaratana; Thailand	235 kg	Tian Wenju; China	234 kg
75 kg
Snatch	Olga Zubova; Russia	115 kg	Maria Harlova; Russia	103 kg	Sandra Perea; Colombia	101 kg
Clean & Jerk	Olga Zubova; Russia	145 kg	Maria Harlova; Russia	125 kg	Sandra Perea; Colombia	122 kg
Total	Olga Zubova; Russia	260 kg	Maria Harlova; Russia	228 kg	Sandra Perea; Colombia	223 kg
+75 kg
Snatch	Verónica Saladín; Dominican Republic	108 kg	Yao Chi-ling; Chinese Taipei	106 kg	Chung Yun-ling; Chinese Taipei	104 kg
Clean & Jerk	Chioma Amaechi; United States	137 kg	Julia Zavgorodnyaya; Russia	136 kg	Naryury Pérez; Venezuela	135 kg
Total	Yao Chi-ling; Chinese Taipei	240 kg	Naryury Pérez; Venezuela	239 kg	Chioma Amaechi; United States	238 kg
