= 2015 World Weightlifting Championships – Men's +105 kg =

The men's +105 kilograms event at the 2015 World Weightlifting Championships was held on 28 November 2015 in Houston, United States.

== Schedule ==
Date	Time	Event
28 November 2015	08:00	Group C
28 November 2015	10:00	Group B
28 November 2015	14:55	Group A

== Medalists ==
Event	Gold		Silver		Bronze	
Snatch	Lasha Talakhadze (GEO)	207 kg	Gor Minasyan (ARM)	203 kg	Irakli Turmanidze (GEO)	202 kg
Clean & Jerk	Mart Seim (EST)	248 kg	Lasha Talakhadze (GEO)	247 kg	Ahmed Mohamed (EGY)	241 kg
Total	Lasha Talakhadze (GEO)	454 kg	Mart Seim (EST)	438 kg	Gor Minasyan (ARM)	437 kg

== Records ==
Prior to this competition, the existing world records were as follows.

World record	Snatch	Behdad Salimi (IRI)	214 kg	Paris, France	13 November 2011
World record	Clean & Jerk	Hossein Rezazadeh (IRI)	263 kg	Athens, Greece	25 August 2004
World record	Total	Hossein Rezazadeh (IRI)	472 kg	Sydney, Australia	26 September 2000

== Results ==
Rank	Athlete	Group	Body weight	Snatch (kg)				Clean & Jerk (kg)				Total
Rank	Athlete	Group	Body weight	1	2	3	Rank	1	2	3	Rank	Total
1st place, gold medalist(s)	Lasha Talakhadze (GEO)	A	155.12	~~200~~	200	207	1st place, gold medalist(s)	238	~~247~~	247	2nd place, silver medalist(s)	454
2nd place, silver medalist(s)	Mart Seim (EST)	A	151.99	~~185~~	185	190	12	241	~~248~~	248	1st place, gold medalist(s)	438
3rd place, bronze medalist(s)	Gor Minasyan (ARM)	A	142.10	195	201	203	2nd place, silver medalist(s)	234	~~240~~	~~240~~	8	437
4	Chen Shih-chieh (TPE)	A	152.43	182	191	195	6	231	~~241~~	241	5	436
5	Yauheni Zharnasek (BLR)	A	153.63	195	~~200~~	201	4	227	233	~~237~~	9	434
6	Almir Velagić (GER)	A	146.16	187	192	195	5	228	233	238	7	433
7	Ruben Aleksanyan (ARM)	A	148.90	185	192	~~196~~	8	241	~~246~~	—	4	433
8	Ahmed Mohamed (EGY)	A	139.88	180	188	~~192~~	13	230	241	~~247~~	3rd place, bronze medalist(s)	429
9	Hojamuhammet Toýçyýew (TKM)	A	139.77	185	190	~~193~~	11	226	233	238	6	428
10	Fernando Reis (BRA)	A	153.86	190	~~195~~	195	7	230	~~240~~	~~240~~	12	425
11	Irakli Turmanidze (GEO)	B	132.26	190	197	202	3rd place, bronze medalist(s)	220	~~228~~	~~228~~	16	422
12	Jiří Orság (CZE)	B	125.85	177	181	185	15	~~229~~	~~229~~	230	10	415
13	Alexej Prochorow (GER)	B	134.36	181	186	190	10	210	218	222	14	412
14	Ihor Shymechko (UKR)	B	130.50	185	191	~~194~~	9	206	212	219	19	410
15	Bahador Molaei (IRI)	B	141.70	~~176~~	176	~~180~~	17	230	~~245~~	~~245~~	11	406
16	Péter Nagy (HUN)	B	155.72	185	~~191~~	~~191~~	16	217	~~228~~	~~228~~	21	402
17	Kamil Kučera (CZE)	B	141.86	165	170	175	20	212	220	225	13	400
18	Caine Wilkes (USA)	B	144.36	~~176~~	~~176~~	176	18	216	220	~~225~~	17	396
19	Arsen Kasabijew (POL)	B	105.24	170	~~175~~	~~175~~	22	215	221	~~225~~	15	391
20	Rustam Djangabaev (UZB)	B	138.26	165	170	174	21	205	210	215	22	389
21	Igor Olshanetskyi (ISR)	B	133.61	164	170	~~175~~	23	207	211	217	20	387
22	Fernando Salas (ECU)	C	157.48	~~168~~	170	~~175~~	24	200	205	211	23	381
23	Serhiy Tahirov (UKR)	C	108.43	165	170	175	19	200	205	~~210~~	25	380
24	Itte Detenamo (NRU)	C	163.99	160	~~165~~	165	27	200	207	~~211~~	24	372
25	Teemu Roininen (FIN)	C	139.82	~~155~~	~~155~~	155	30	196	200	~~203~~	26	355
26	Kim Tollefsen (NOR)	C	115.96	154	~~159~~	~~159~~	31	190	197	~~201~~	27	351
27	Ante Vuković (CRO)	C	129.27	160	~~163~~	~~163~~	28	190	~~193~~	—	28	350
—	Mohamed Ihsan (EGY)	A	160.55	187	~~196~~	—	14	—	—	—	—	—
—	George Kobaladze (CAN)	C	138.61	~~162~~	162	168	25	~~211~~	~~211~~	~~219~~	—	—
—	Vincas Šlevinskis (LTU)	C	128.21	160	165	~~170~~	26	~~190~~	~~190~~	~~190~~	—	—
—	Kazuomi Ota (JPN)	C	149.09	160	—	—	29	~~200~~	—	—	—	—
—	Krzysztof Klicki (POL)	B	180.40	~~171~~	~~171~~	~~171~~	—	~~220~~	220	~~230~~	18	—
DQ	Aleksey Lovchev (RUS)	A	140.46	200	206	211	—	242	248	264	—	475

== New records ==
Clean & Jerk	~~264 kg~~	~~Aleksey Lovchev (RUS)~~	~~WR~~
Total	~~475 kg~~	~~Aleksey Lovchev (RUS)~~	~~WR~~
