= Mart Seim =

Estonian weightlifter (born 1990)

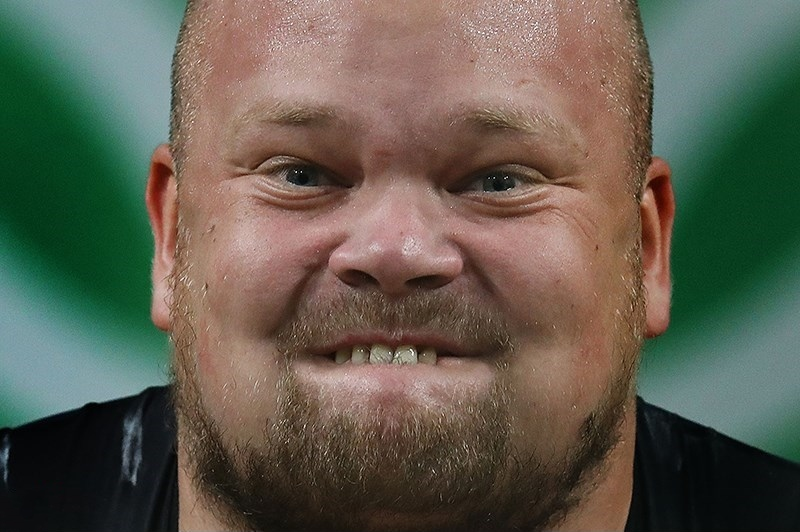

Personal information
- Nationality: Estonian
- Born: 24 October 1990 (age 35) Rakvere, Estonia
- Education: Tallinn University
- Height: 1.85 m (6 ft 1 in)
- Weight: 149 kg (328 lb)

Sport
- Country: Estonia
- Sport: Weightlifting
- Event: +109 kg
- Club: SK Sparta
- Personal bests: Snatch: 192 kg (2018); Clean & jerk: 253 kg (2017); Total: 444 kg (2017)
Medal record
World Championships
Silver medal – second place	2015 Houston	+105 kg
European Championships
Silver medal – second place	2025 Chișinău	+109 kg
Bronze medal – third place	2016 Førde	+105 kg

Mart Seim (born 24 October 1990) is an Estonian weightlifter competing in the +105 kg category.

== Career ==
Seim competed for Estonia at the 2014 World Weightlifting Championships finishing 4th with a total of 431 kg.

At the 2015 World Weightlifting Championships he finished third at the men's +105 kg. After Aleksey Lovchev failed doping tests, Seim was promoted to second place (Silver), and Georgian Lasha Talakhadze to Gold.

In August 2024, he finished in ninth place in the men's +102 kg event at the 2024 Summer Olympics held in Paris, France.

Seim's father and grandfather were also weightlifters.

== Major results ==
Year	Venue	Weight	Snatch (kg)				Clean & Jerk (kg)				Total	Rank
Year	Venue	Weight	1	2	3	Rank	1	2	3	Rank	Total	Rank
Olympic Games
2016	Rio de Janeiro, Brazil	+105 kg	~~187~~	187	~~191~~	—N/a	243	~~250~~	~~255~~	—N/a	430	7
2024	Paris, France	+102 kg	175	180	~~183~~	—N/a	220	~~237~~	~~237~~	—N/a	400	9
World Championships
2014	Almaty, Kazakhstan	+105 kg	180	185	~~188~~	11	234	243	246	4	431	4
2015	Houston, United States	+105 kg	~~185~~	185	190	12	241	~~248~~	248	1st place, gold medalist(s)	438	2nd place, silver medalist(s)
2017	Anaheim, United States	+105 kg	185	191	~~195~~	7	245	~~251~~	253	2nd place, silver medalist(s)	444	5
2018	Ashgabat, Turkmenistan	+109 kg	185	192	~~195~~	9	235	~~251~~	~~251~~	5	427	5
2019	Pattaya, Thailand	+109 kg	~~175~~	~~175~~	175	20	225	~~230~~	~~230~~	16	400	17
2021	Tashkent, Uzbekistan	+109 kg	175	~~180~~	~~180~~	15	225	~~233~~	~~236~~	11	400	12
2022	Bogotá, Colombia	+109 kg	170	~~175~~	177	16	~~220~~	~~220~~	220	16	397	15
2023	Riyadh, Saudi Arabia	+109 kg	175	180	~~185~~	13	~~225~~	225	~~232~~	9	405	10
IWF World Cup
2024	Phuket, Thailand	+109 kg	~~180~~	180	~~185~~	12	—	—	—	—	—	—
European Championships
2012	Antalya, Turkey	+105 kg	147	~~152~~	152	17	200	206	~~209~~	10	358	12
2013	Tirana, Albania	+105 kg	165	~~170~~	~~170~~	11	~~220~~	~~220~~	221	5	386	8
2014	Tel Aviv, Israel	+105 kg	175	182	~~185~~	9	~~226~~	226	236	3rd place, bronze medalist(s)	418	6
2016	Førde, Norway	+105 kg	~~185~~	185	~~191~~	6	235	239	~~250~~	2nd place, silver medalist(s)	424	3rd place, bronze medalist(s)
2017	Split, Croatia	+105 kg	180	~~185~~	~~185~~	9	235	242	246	2nd place, silver medalist(s)	426	5
2023	Yerevan, Armenia	+109 kg	~~170~~	170	175	5	~~220~~	220	–	5	395	4
2024	Sofia, Bulgaria	+109 kg	180	185	~~188~~	4	225	~~237~~	—	4	410	4
2025	Chișinău, Moldova	+109 kg	175	~~180~~	180	5	227	235	—	2nd place, silver medalist(s)	415	2nd place, silver medalist(s)
Summer Universiade
2011	Shenzhen, China	+105 kg	144	150	~~153~~	12	190	~~197~~	~~200~~	13	340	13

Awards
Preceded by Rasmus Mägi	Estonian Athlete of the Year; 2015	Succeeded by Rasmus Mägi
