= Albegov =

Albegov (masculine, Russian: Албегов) or Albegova (feminine, Russian: Албегова) is a Russian surname. Notable people with the surname include:

- Ruslan Albegov (born 1988), Russian weightlifter
- Soslan Albegov (born 1997), Russian footballer
