= Irakli Turmanidze =

Georgian weightlifter (born 1984)

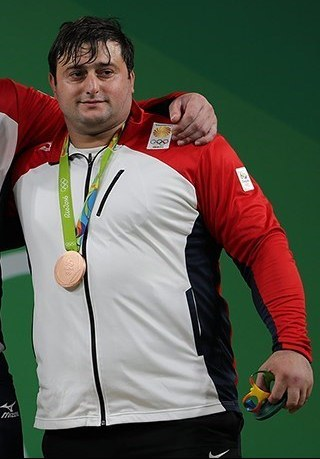
- Turmanidze at Rio 2016

Personal information
- Nationality: Georgian
- Born: December 13, 1984 (age 41) Kobuleti, Georgian SSR, Soviet Union
- Height: 1.86 m (6 ft 1 in)
- Weight: 139.15 kg (306.8 lb)

Sport
- Country: Georgia
- Sport: Weightlifting
- Event: +109 kg
Medal record
Men's weightlifting
Representing Georgia
Olympic Games
Bronze medal – third place	2016 Rio de Janeiro	+105 kg
European Weightlifting Championships
Bronze medal – third place	2012 Antalya	+105 kg
Gold medal – first place	2015 Tbilisi	+105 kg
Silver medal – second place	2019 Batumi	+109 kg

Irakli Turmanidze (Georgian: ირაკლი თურმანიძე; born 13 December 1984 in Kobuleti) is a Georgian weightlifter. He competed at the 2012 Summer Olympics in the +105 kg event. In March 2024, Ruslan Albegov and Turmanidze were disqualified from the 2012 competition. Turmanidze later won a bronze medal at the 2016 Summer Olympics in the +105 kg weight division.

== Major results ==
Year	Venue	Weight	Snatch (kg)				Clean & Jerk (kg)				Total	Rank
Year	Venue	Weight	1	2	3	Rank	1	2	3	Rank	Total	Rank
Olympic Games
2012	London, United Kingdom	+105 kg	192	198	~~201~~	~~4~~	225	~~232~~	~~232~~	~~7~~	~~433~~	DSQ
2016	Rio de Janeiro, Brazil	+105 kg	197	203	207	4	228	235	241	4	448	3rd place, bronze medalist(s)
World Championships
2009	Goyang, South Korea	105 kg	165	170	175	9	~~200~~	200	205	15	380	13
2010	Antalya, Turkey	+105 kg	175	180	185	11	205	210	215	14	400	12
2011	Paris, France	+105 kg	180	~~185~~	~~188~~	13	210	215	218	14	398	12
2014	Almaty, Kazakhstan	+105 kg	185	190	195	4	220	~~227~~	227	10	422	6
2015	Houston, United States	+105 kg	190	197	202	3rd place, bronze medalist(s)	220	~~228~~	~~228~~	16	422	11
2018	Ashgabat, Turkmenistan	+109 kg	195	200	203	3rd place, bronze medalist(s)	—	—	—	—	—	—
