= Luis Javier Mosquera =

Colombian Olympic weightlifter

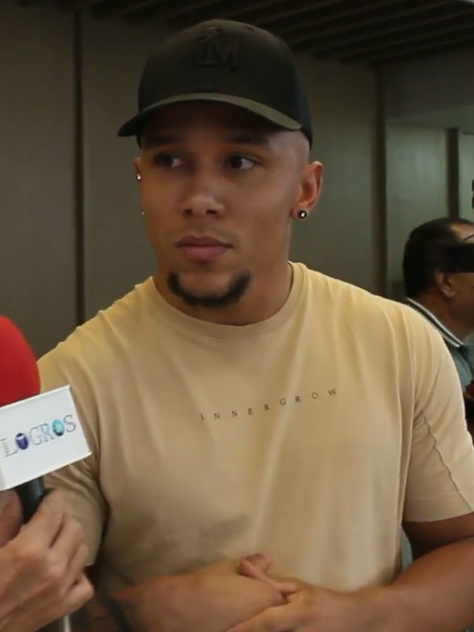
- Mosquera in 2024

Personal information
- Full name: Luis Javier Mosquera Lozano
- Nationality: Colombian
- Born: 27 March 1995 (age 31) Yumbo, Colombia
- Height: 1.65 m (5 ft 5 in)
- Weight: 73 kg (161 lb)

Sport
- Country: Colombia
- Sport: Weightlifting
- Events: 67 kg; 71 kg; 73 kg

Achievements and titles
- Personal bests: Snatch: 145 kg (2026); Clean & jerk: 170 kg (2026); Total: 315 kg (2026)
Medal record
Representing Colombia
Men's weightlifting
Big (Total)
Event	1st	2nd	3rd
Olympic Games	0	1	1
Junior World Championships	2	1	0
Youth World Championships	1	0	1
Pan American Games	1	2	0
Pan American Championships	4	2	0
South American Games	1	1	0
Total	9	7	2
Big and small medals
Event	1st	2nd	3rd
Olympic Games	0	1	1
World Championships	0	0	1
Junior World Championships	6	3	0
Youth World Championships	3	1	2
Pan American Games	1	2	0
Pan American Championships	13	5	1
South American Games	1	1	0
Bolivarian Games	0	2	0
Total	24	15	5
Olympic Games
Silver medal – second place	2020 Tokyo	67 kg
Bronze medal – third place	2016 Rio de Janeiro	69 kg
Pan American Games
Gold medal – first place	2015 Toronto	69 kg
Silver medal – second place	2019 Lima	73 kg
Silver medal – second place	2023 Santiago	73 kg
Pan American Championships
Gold medal – first place	2017 Miami	69 kg
Gold medal – first place	2020 Santo Domingo	67 kg
Gold medal – first place	2024 Caracas	73 kg
Gold medal – first place	2026 Panama City	71 kg
Silver medal – second place	2019 Guatemala City	73 kg
Silver medal – second place	2021 Guayaquil	67 kg
South American Games
Gold medal – first place	2026 Santa Fe	70 kg
Silver medal – second place	2014 Santiago	62 kg
Bolivarian Games
Silver medal – second place	2022 Valledupar	73 kg S
Silver medal – second place	2022 Valledupar	73 kg CJ
Junior World Championships
Gold medal – first place	2014 Kazan	62 kg
Gold medal – first place	2015 Wrocław	69 kg
Silver medal – second place	2013 Lima	62 kg
Youth World Championships
Gold medal – first place	2012 Košice	62 kg
Bronze medal – third place	2011 Lima	56 kg

Luis Javier Mosquera Lozano (born 27 March 1995) is a Colombian Olympic weightlifter. He represented his country in the Men's 69 kg Weightlifting competition at the 2016 Summer Olympics on August 9, 2016, winning the bronze medal. He initially finished fourth behind Izzat Artykov, who was later disqualified for failing a performance-enhancing drugs test. He received his bronze medal on March 28, 2019.

In 2021, he won the silver medal in the men's 67 kg event at the 2020 Summer Olympics held in Tokyo, Japan.

== Career ==
In 2012, he was the Youth World Champion in the 62kg category. He is a two time Junior Pan American Champion, winning in 2014 in the 62kg category and in 2015 in the 69kg category. He is also a two time Junior World Champion, winning in 2014 in the 62kg category and in 2015 in the 69kg category. In 2015, he was the Pan American Games champion and in 2016 was the South American Games Champion.

In 2016, he competed at the 2016 Summer Olympics winning bronze medal in the 69 kg division.

In 2021, he competed at the 2020 Summer Olympics in the 67 kg category winning the silver medal with a total of 331 kg.

In August 2024, Mosquera competed in the men's 73 kg event at the 2024 Summer Olympics held in Paris, France. He lifted 340 kg in total and placed fifth. Mosquera shared second place after the Snatch but was only seventh in the Clear & Jerk.

== Achievements ==
Year	Venue	Weight	Snatch (kg)				Clean & Jerk (kg)				Total	Rank
Year	Venue	Weight	1	2	3	Rank	1	2	3	Rank	Total	Rank
Representing Colombia
Olympic Games
2016	Rio de Janeiro, Brazil	69 kg	~~150~~	150	155 AM	4	183	~~189~~	~~190~~	3	338	3rd place, bronze medalist(s)
2020	Tokyo, Japan	67 kg	148	~~151~~	151 AM	1	175	~~180~~	180	2	331 AM	2nd place, silver medalist(s)
2024	Paris, France	73 kg	~~150~~	150	155	3	~~185~~	185	~~189~~	7	340	5
World Championships
2014	Almaty, Kazakhstan	62 kg	136	140	141	3rd place, bronze medalist(s)	165	170	~~174~~	4	311	4
2018	Ashgabat, Turkmenistan	73 kg	—	—	—	—N/a	—	—	—	—N/a	—N/a	—N/a
2019	Pattaya, Thailand	67 kg	145	~~151~~	~~151~~	5	~~175~~	175	~~181~~	6	320	5
2021	Tashkent, Uzbekistan	67 kg	~~145~~	~~145~~	~~145~~	—N/a	—	—	—	—N/a	—N/a	—N/a
2023	Riyadh, Saudi Arabia	73 kg	145	~~150~~	150	6	~~175~~	~~175~~	175	14	325	11
2024	Manama, Bahrain	73 kg	150	~~154~~	~~154~~	7	~~174~~	~~174~~	174	14	324	12
IWF World Cup
2024	Phuket, Thailand	73 kg	~~150~~	150	~~154~~	13	180	185	~~188~~	8	335	9
Pan American Games
2015	Toronto, Canada	69 kg	145	150	~~155~~	—N/a	175	181	—	—N/a	331	1st place, gold medalist(s)
2019	Lima, Peru	73 kg	150	~~155~~	~~155~~	—N/a	175	~~180~~	~~185~~	—N/a	325	2nd place, silver medalist(s)
2023	Santiago, Chile	73 kg	150	~~153~~	153	—N/a	180	~~184~~	~~186~~	—N/a	333	2nd place, silver medalist(s)
Pan American Championships
2016	Cartagena, Colombia	69 kg	~~145~~	145	148	1st place, gold medalist(s)	~~180~~	~~181~~	~~181~~	—N/a	—N/a	—N/a
2017	Miami, United States	69 kg	~~145~~	145	~~156~~	1st place, gold medalist(s)	175	180	~~190~~	1st place, gold medalist(s)	325	1st place, gold medalist(s)
2019	Guatemala City, Guatemala	73 kg	~~147~~	147	~~152~~	2nd place, silver medalist(s)	175	~~180~~	~~180~~	3rd place, bronze medalist(s)	322	2nd place, silver medalist(s)
2020	Santo Domingo, Dominican Republic	67 kg	140	~~145~~	145	1st place, gold medalist(s)	173	~~178~~	~~178~~	1st place, gold medalist(s)	318	1st place, gold medalist(s)
2021	Guayaquil, Ecuador	67 kg	141	145	~~150~~	1st place, gold medalist(s)	172	~~177~~	~~177~~	2nd place, silver medalist(s)	317	2nd place, silver medalist(s)
2024	Caracas, Venezuela	73 kg	~~150~~	150	153	2nd place, silver medalist(s)	~~180~~	~~180~~	184	1st place, gold medalist(s)	337	1st place, gold medalist(s)
2026	Panama City, Panama	71 kg	~~135~~	135	145	1st place, gold medalist(s)	~~170~~	170	~~180~~	1st place, gold medalist(s)	315	1st place, gold medalist(s)
South American Games
2014	Santiago, Chile	62 kg	~~125~~	125	~~130~~	—N/a	145	154	~~156~~	—N/a	279	2nd place, silver medalist(s)
2026	Rosario, Argentina	70 kg	140	145	~~150~~	—N/a	170	178	~~182~~	—N/a	323	1st place, gold medalist(s)
Bolivarian Games
2022	Valledupar, Colombia	73 kg	145	150	~~153~~	2nd place, silver medalist(s)	175	~~186~~	—	2nd place, silver medalist(s)	—N/a	—N/a
Junior World Championships
2013	Lima, Peru	62 kg	125	130	~~133~~	2nd place, silver medalist(s)	150	~~155~~	~~155~~	2nd place, silver medalist(s)	280	2nd place, silver medalist(s)
2014	Kazan, Russia	62 kg	130	135	137	1st place, gold medalist(s)	160	162	165	1st place, gold medalist(s)	302	1st place, gold medalist(s)
2015	Wrocław, Poland	69 kg	145	150	151	1st place, gold medalist(s)	180	187	~~191~~	1st place, gold medalist(s)	338 AM	1st place, gold medalist(s)
Youth World Championships
2011	Lima, Peru	56 kg	100	104	~~108~~	1st place, gold medalist(s)	125	~~130~~	~~130~~	3rd place, bronze medalist(s)	229	3rd place, bronze medalist(s)
2012	Košice, Slovakia	62 kg	122	126	128	2nd place, silver medalist(s)	150	155	~~160~~	1st place, gold medalist(s)	283	1st place, gold medalist(s)
