= 2013 World Weightlifting Championships – Men's +105 kg =

The men's competition in the +105 kg division was held on 26–27 October 2013 in Centennial Hall, Wrocław, Poland.

== Schedule ==
Date	Time	Event
26 October 2013	10:00	Group C
27 October 2013	10:00	Group B
27 October 2013	15:55	Group A

== Medalists ==
Event	Gold		Silver		Bronze	
Snatch	Ruslan Albegov (RUS)	209 kg	Bahador Molaei (IRI)	203 kg	Aleksey Lovchev (RUS)	200 kg
Clean & Jerk	Bahador Molaei (IRI)	255 kg	Ruslan Albegov (RUS)	255 kg	Artem Udachyn (UKR)	232 kg
Total	Ruslan Albegov (RUS)	464 kg	Bahador Molaei (IRI)	458 kg	Aleksey Lovchev (RUS)	430 kg

== Records ==
Prior to this competition, the existing world records were as follows.

World Record	Snatch	Behdad Salimi (IRI)	214 kg	Paris, France	13 November 2011
World Record	Clean & Jerk	Hossein Rezazadeh (IRI)	263 kg	Athens, Greece	25 August 2004
World Record	Total	Hossein Rezazadeh (IRI)	472 kg	Sydney, Australia	26 September 2000

== Results ==
Rank	Athlete	Group	Body weight	Snatch (kg)				Clean & Jerk (kg)				Total
Rank	Athlete	Group	Body weight	1	2	3	Rank	1	2	3	Rank	Total
1st place, gold medalist(s)	Ruslan Albegov (RUS)	A	153.69	197	205	209	1st place, gold medalist(s)	242	~~255~~	255	2nd place, silver medalist(s)	464
2nd place, silver medalist(s)	Bahador Molaei (IRI)	A	137.96	195	200	203	2nd place, silver medalist(s)	241	255	~~261~~	1st place, gold medalist(s)	458
3rd place, bronze medalist(s)	Aleksey Lovchev (RUS)	A	129.25	191	196	200	3rd place, bronze medalist(s)	230	~~240~~	—	5	430
4	Mohamed Ihsan (EGY)	A	149.73	180	185	~~188~~	8	231	~~240~~	~~240~~	4	416
5	Yauheni Zharnasek (BLR)	A	150.62	190	~~196~~	~~197~~	5	220	~~225~~	226	7	416
6	Péter Nagy (HUN)	A	155.62	~~185~~	185	191	4	220	~~227~~	~~228~~	10	411
7	Fernando Reis (BRA)	A	138.41	~~182~~	182	~~188~~	10	223	228	~~230~~	6	410
8	Ai Yunan (CHN)	A	147.23	180	185	~~190~~	7	~~220~~	220	225	8	410
9	Daniel Dołęga (POL)	A	123.11	177	~~184~~	184	9	217	~~222~~	~~222~~	11	401
10	Hayk Hakobyan (ARM)	B	127.32	175	183	186	6	205	~~215~~	215	13	401
11	George Kobaladze (CAN)	B	139.62	166	172	174	14	218	223	~~228~~	9	397
12	Kornel Czekiel (POL)	A	105.37	172	177	~~179~~	11	215	~~220~~	~~224~~	12	392
13	Freddy Rentería (COL)	B	156.49	170	175	~~179~~	13	~~210~~	~~210~~	210	15	385
14	Kazuomi Ota (JPN)	B	145.30	172	176	~~178~~	12	~~205~~	~~205~~	205	16	381
15	Caine Wilkes (USA)	B	133.80	168	~~173~~	~~174~~	17	210	~~217~~	~~217~~	14	378
16	Selimkhan Abubakarov (KAZ)	B	135.82	162	170	~~175~~	16	192	~~200~~	200	18	370
17	Anderson Calero (ECU)	B	152.05	160	167	~~170~~	18	190	197	~~204~~	19	364
18	Igor Olshanetskyi (ISR)	B	124.73	155	161	~~167~~	19	~~191~~	191	200	17	361
19	Teemu Roininen (FIN)	C	132.03	~~147~~	147	~~151~~	21	189	~~196~~	~~200~~	20	336
20	Eero Oja (FIN)	C	122.76	145	150	~~152~~	20	185	~~192~~	~~195~~	21	335
21	Sandeep Kumar (IND)	C	138.18	140	~~145~~	145	22	185	~~195~~	~~195~~	22	330
22	Lewis Chua (SIN)	C	125.67	~~126~~	126	~~130~~	23	~~160~~	160	~~168~~	23	286
23	Scott Wong (SIN)	C	113.05	120	~~125~~	125	24	~~150~~	~~150~~	150	24	275
—	Christian López (GUA)	B	142.23	172	~~176~~	~~176~~	15	~~213~~	~~213~~	~~213~~	—	—
—	Artem Udachyn (UKR)	A	169.35	~~193~~	~~193~~	~~195~~	—	232	~~241~~	~~242~~	3rd place, bronze medalist(s)	—
DQ	Sergei Dolgalev (KGZ)	B	113.73	165	~~170~~	~~172~~	—	190	~~200~~	~~200~~	—	—
