= 2014 World Weightlifting Championships – Men's +105 kg =

The men's +105 kilograms event at the 2014 World Weightlifting Championships was held on 15–16 November 2014 in Baluan Sholak Sports Palace, Almaty, Kazakhstan.

== Schedule ==
Date	Time	Event
15 November 2014	21:00	Group C
16 November 2014	11:00	Group B
16 November 2014	17:00	Group A

== Medalists ==
Event	Gold		Silver		Bronze	
Snatch	Ruslan Albegov (RUS)	210 kg	Behdad Salimi (IRI)	206 kg	Yauheni Zharnasek (BLR)	199 kg
Clean & Jerk	Aleksey Lovchev (RUS)	257 kg	Ruslan Albegov (RUS)	252 kg	Behdad Salimi (IRI)	251 kg
Total	Ruslan Albegov (RUS)	462 kg	Behdad Salimi (IRI)	457 kg	Mohamed Ihsan (EGY)	436 kg

== Records ==
Prior to this competition, the existing world records were as follows.

World record	Snatch	Behdad Salimi (IRI)	214 kg	Paris, France	13 November 2011
World record	Clean & Jerk	Hossein Rezazadeh (IRI)	263 kg	Athens, Greece	25 August 2004
World record	Total	Hossein Rezazadeh (IRI)	472 kg	Sydney, Australia	26 September 2000

== Results ==
Rank	Athlete	Group	Body weight	Snatch (kg)				Clean & Jerk (kg)				Total
Rank	Athlete	Group	Body weight	1	2	3	Rank	1	2	3	Rank	Total
1st place, gold medalist(s)	Ruslan Albegov (RUS)	A	156.54	~~203~~	205	210	1st place, gold medalist(s)	245	~~252~~	252	2nd place, silver medalist(s)	462
2nd place, silver medalist(s)	Behdad Salimi (IRI)	A	171.06	206	~~211~~	~~211~~	2nd place, silver medalist(s)	246	251	~~257~~	3rd place, bronze medalist(s)	457
3rd place, bronze medalist(s)	Mohamed Ihsan (EGY)	A	160.24	188	193	~~197~~	5	235	243	~~247~~	5	436
4	Mart Seim (EST)	A	145.48	180	185	~~188~~	11	234	243	246	4	431
5	Yauheni Zharnasek (BLR)	A	158.32	190	195	199	3rd place, bronze medalist(s)	221	227	~~230~~	11	426
6	Irakli Turmanidze (GEO)	A	129.90	185	190	195	4	220	~~227~~	227	10	422
7	Almir Velagić (GER)	A	145.48	183	188	191	7	223	230	~~235~~	8	421
8	Oleg Proshak (UKR)	A	128.13	187	192	~~197~~	6	228	~~234~~	~~234~~	9	420
9	Fernando Reis (BRA)	A	142.97	182	~~190~~	190	8	225	230	~~235~~	7	420
10	Ahmed Mohamed (EGY)	A	137.36	175	~~181~~	181	15	225	230	~~240~~	6	411
11	Péter Nagy (HUN)	A	151.04	185	~~189~~	~~189~~	12	216	222	~~227~~	12	407
12	Kazuomi Ota (JPN)	B	147.70	177	183	187	10	211	219	~~226~~	14	406
13	Ivan Efremov (UZB)	B	111.47	182	188	~~192~~	9	~~216~~	~~217~~	217	18	405
14	Hayk Hakobyan (ARM)	B	131.39	175	182	~~188~~	13	210	218	~~224~~	17	400
15	Ibragim Bersanov (KAZ)	B	118.47	~~180~~	180	~~185~~	16	211	218	~~226~~	15	398
16	George Kobaladze (CAN)	B	139.42	163	169	173	20	~~212~~	215	221	13	394
17	Daniel Dołęga (POL)	B	118.53	~~175~~	~~175~~	175	17	212	218	~~225~~	16	393
18	Krzysztof Klicki (POL)	B	166.63	172	~~177~~	~~177~~	22	~~210~~	211	217	19	389
19	Selimkhan Abubakarov (KAZ)	B	144.66	~~175~~	~~175~~	175	18	205	210	~~215~~	21	385
20	Caine Wilkes (USA)	B	139.73	173	~~178~~	~~178~~	21	~~211~~	211	~~216~~	20	384
21	Fernando Salas (ECU)	C	150.35	165	170	175	19	200	205	—	23	380
22	Vasyl Pylypenko (UKR)	C	115.32	160	~~165~~	165	25	200	205	~~212~~	22	370
23	Igor Olshanetskyi (ISR)	C	132.14	~~160~~	160	167	24	200	~~210~~	~~212~~	24	367
24	Modestas Šimkus (LTU)	C	111.88	163	168	~~171~~	23	187	192	~~200~~	27	360
25	Teemu Roininen (FIN)	C	142.39	150	155	~~158~~	28	~~200~~	~~200~~	200	25	355
26	Chao Shih-chieh (TPE)	C	135.05	151	157	161	26	190	~~201~~	~~201~~	29	351
27	Lukáš Kožienka (SVK)	C	105.35	150	~~154~~	~~156~~	29	190	~~195~~	~~195~~	28	340
28	Riho Kägo (EST)	C	118.31	~~155~~	155	~~160~~	27	185	~~190~~	~~191~~	30	340
29	Silvio Bijelić (CRO)	C	136.07	140	~~145~~	145	30	185	~~191~~	~~191~~	31	330
—	Alexej Prochorow (GER)	C	132.77	175	182	~~188~~	14	~~205~~	~~205~~	~~205~~	—	—
—	Aleksey Lovchev (RUS)	A	139.80	~~205~~	~~205~~	~~206~~	—	245	250	257	1st place, gold medalist(s)	—
—	Sergej Lichovoj (LTU)	C	105.10	~~155~~	~~155~~	~~155~~	—	185	190	195	26	—
—	Ruben Aleksanyan (ARM)	A	150.77	~~190~~	~~190~~	~~190~~	—	—	—	—	—	—
