= 2013 Junior World Weightlifting Championships =

International weightlifting competition

- Location: Lima, Peru
- Dates: 3–10 May 2013

The 2013 Junior World Weightlifting Championships were held in Lima, Peru from 3 to 10 May 2013.

== Medal table ==
Ranking by Big (Total result) medals

* Host nation (Peru)

Rank	Nation	Gold	Silver	Bronze	Total
1	China (CHN)	6	1	0	7
2	Russia (RUS)	5	2	1	8
3	Belarus (BLR)	1	1	0	2
3	Kazakhstan (KAZ)	1	1	0	2
5	Georgia (GEO)	1	0	0	1
5	Mexico (MEX)	1	0	0	1
7	Colombia (COL)	0	2	1	3
8	Dominican Republic (DOM)	0	2	0	2
9	Armenia (ARM)	0	1	1	2
9	Azerbaijan (AZE)	0	1	1	2
9	Egypt (EGY)	0	1	1	2
9	United States (USA)	0	1	1	2
13	Iraq (IRQ)	0	1	0	1
13	Romania (ROU)	0	1	0	1
15	Canada (CAN)	0	0	1	1
15	Cuba (CUB)	0	0	1	1
15	India (IND)	0	0	1	1
15	Poland (POL)	0	0	1	1
15	Thailand (THA)	0	0	1	1
15	Tunisia (TUN)	0	0	1	1
15	Turkey (TUR)	0	0	1	1
15	Ukraine (UKR)	0	0	1	1
15	Venezuela (VEN)	0	0	1	1
Totals (23 entries)		15	15	15	45

Ranking by all medals: Big (Total result) and Small (Snatch and Clean & Jerk)

* Host nation (Peru)

Rank	Nation	Gold	Silver	Bronze	Total
1	China (CHN)	15	5	2	22
2	Russia (RUS)	12	6	3	21
3	Kazakhstan (KAZ)	4	2	0	6
4	Georgia (GEO)	3	0	0	3
4	Mexico (MEX)	3	0	0	3
6	Belarus (BLR)	2	2	2	6
7	Dominican Republic (DOM)	1	4	1	6
8	Azerbaijan (AZE)	1	3	2	6
9	Romania (ROU)	1	2	0	3
10	Iraq (IRQ)	1	1	1	3
11	Thailand (THA)	1	0	2	3
11	Turkey (TUR)	1	0	2	3
13	Colombia (COL)	0	6	3	9
14	Armenia (ARM)	0	4	3	7
15	Egypt (EGY)	0	3	3	6
16	Cuba (CUB)	0	2	2	4
17	Canada (CAN)	0	2	1	3
18	United States (USA)	0	1	4	5
19	Poland (POL)	0	1	2	3
20	Venezuela (VEN)	0	1	1	2
21	India (IND)	0	0	3	3
21	Tunisia (TUN)	0	0	3	3
21	Ukraine (UKR)	0	0	3	3
24	Great Britain (GBR)	0	0	1	1
24	Spain (ESP)	0	0	1	1
Totals (25 entries)		45	45	45	135

== Medal summary ==
=== Men ===
Event	Gold		Silver		Bronze	
56 kg
Snatch	Muammer Şahin; Turkey	107 kg	Jhon Serna; Colombia	106 kg	Wei Xiameng; China	105 kg
Clean & Jerk	Wei Xiameng; China	139 kg	Jhon Serna; Colombia	137 kg	Darren Barnes; United States	133 kg
Total	Wei Xiameng; China	244 kg	Jhon Serna; Colombia	243 kg	Muammer Şahin; Turkey	233 kg
62 kg
Snatch	Chen Meilong; China	135 kg	Luis Javier Mosquera; Colombia	130 kg	Lebinson Palomeque; Colombia	122 kg
Clean & Jerk	Chen Meilong; China	160 kg	Luis Javier Mosquera; Colombia	150 kg	Lebinson Palomeque; Colombia	150 kg
Total	Chen Meilong; China	295 kg	Luis Javier Mosquera; Colombia	280 kg	Lebinson Palomeque; Colombia	272 kg
69 kg
Snatch	Karrar Mohammed; Iraq	145 kg	Ediel Márquez; Cuba	138 kg	Huang Wenwen; China	138 kg
Clean & Jerk	Huang Wenwen; China	178 kg	Firidun Guliyev; Azerbaijan	176 kg	Karrar Mohammed; Iraq	171 kg
Total	Huang Wenwen; China	316 kg	Karrar Mohammed; Iraq	316 kg	Firidun Guliyev; Azerbaijan	308 kg
77 kg
Snatch	Guo Zhimin; China	165 kg	Andranik Karapetyan; Armenia	160 kg	Nijat Rahimov; Azerbaijan	153 kg
Clean & Jerk	Razmik Unanyan; Russia	192 kg	Nijat Rahimov; Azerbaijan	187 kg	Andranik Karapetyan; Armenia	180 kg
Total	Razmik Unanyan; Russia	345 kg	Nijat Rahimov; Azerbaijan	340 kg	Andranik Karapetyan; Armenia	340 kg
85 kg
Snatch	Artem Okulov; Russia	165 kg	Aleh Khuhayeu; Belarus	155 kg	Arley Méndez; Cuba	151 kg
Clean & Jerk	Artem Okulov; Russia	195 kg	Arley Méndez; Cuba	191 kg	Aleh Khuhayeu; Belarus	190 kg
Total	Artem Okulov; Russia	360 kg	Aleh Khuhayeu; Belarus	345 kg	Arley Méndez; Cuba	342 kg
94 kg
Snatch	Alexei Kosov; Russia	173 kg	Konstantin Roschupkin; Russia	168 kg	Saad Ossama; Egypt	165 kg
Clean & Jerk	Nailkhan Nabiyev; Azerbaijan	205 kg	Konstantin Roschupkin; Russia	203 kg	Saad Ossama; Egypt	200 kg
Total	Konstantin Roschupkin; Russia	371 kg	Alexei Kosov; Russia	370 kg	Saad Ossama; Egypt	365 kg
105 kg
Snatch	Rodion Bochkov; Russia	172 kg	Soslan Dzagoev; Russia	170 kg	Roman Vasylevskyi; Ukraine	168 kg
Clean & Jerk	Rodion Bochkov; Russia	202 kg	Jarosław Samoraj; Poland	201 kg	Soslan Dzagoev; Russia	201 kg
Total	Rodion Bochkov; Russia	374 kg	Soslan Dzagoev; Russia	371 kg	Jarosław Samoraj; Poland	363 kg
+105 kg
Snatch	Lasha Talakhadze; Georgia	190 kg	Gor Minasyan; Armenia	183 kg	Karen Martirosian; Russia	180 kg
Clean & Jerk	Lasha Talakhadze; Georgia	221 kg	Gor Minasyan; Armenia	220 kg	Darius Jokarzadeh; Great Britain	215 kg
Total	Lasha Talakhadze; Georgia	411 kg	Gor Minasyan; Armenia	403 kg	Karen Martirosian; Russia	385 kg

=== Women ===
Event	Gold		Silver		Bronze	
48 kg
Snatch	Guan Chunying; China	82 kg	Beatriz Pirón; Dominican Republic	77 kg	Saikhom Mirabai Chanu; India	72 kg
Clean & Jerk	Guan Chunying; China	100 kg	Beatriz Pirón; Dominican Republic	95 kg	Saikhom Mirabai Chanu; India	93 kg
Total	Guan Chunying; China	182 kg	Beatriz Pirón; Dominican Republic	172 kg	Saikhom Mirabai Chanu; India	165 kg
53 kg
Snatch	Sopita Tanasan; Thailand	91 kg	Liu Quan; China	88 kg	Alena Chychkan; Belarus	87 kg
Clean & Jerk	Alena Chychkan; Belarus	112 kg	Liu Quan; China	110 kg	Sopita Tanasan; Thailand	106 kg
Total	Alena Chychkan; Belarus	199 kg	Liu Quan; China	198 kg	Sopita Tanasan; Thailand	197 kg
58 kg
Snatch	Yineisy Reyes; Dominican Republic	95 kg	Ksenia Maximova; Russia	94 kg	Izabella Yaylyan; Armenia	87 kg
Clean & Jerk	Ksenia Maximova; Russia	111 kg	Yusleidy Figueroa; Venezuela	110 kg	Yineisy Reyes; Dominican Republic	110 kg
Total	Ksenia Maximova; Russia	205 kg	Yineisy Reyes; Dominican Republic	205 kg	Yusleidy Figueroa; Venezuela	195 kg
63 kg
Snatch	Mădălina Molie; Romania	103 kg	Shen Yinyi; China	100 kg	Irene Martínez; Spain	93 kg
Clean & Jerk	Shen Yinyi; China	122 kg	Mădălina Molie; Romania	118 kg	Nadiia Chibisova; Ukraine	116 kg
Total	Shen Yinyi; China	222 kg	Mădălina Molie; Romania	221 kg	Nadiia Chibisova; Ukraine	204 kg
69 kg
Snatch	Wang Xinyue; China	115 kg	Zhazira Zhapparkul; Kazakhstan	105 kg	Ghada Hassine; Tunisia	101 kg
Clean & Jerk	Zhazira Zhapparkul; Kazakhstan	135 kg	Wang Xinyue; China	130 kg	Ghada Hassine; Tunisia	121 kg
Total	Wang Xinyue; China	245 kg	Zhazira Zhapparkul; Kazakhstan	240 kg	Ghada Hassine; Tunisia	222 kg
75 kg
Snatch	Anastasiya Shvabauer; Kazakhstan	98 kg	Prabdeep Sanghera; Canada	97 kg	Jolanta Wiór; Poland	96 kg
Clean & Jerk	Anastasiya Shvabauer; Kazakhstan	126 kg	Johanie Filiatrault; Canada	119 kg	Sümeyye Kentli; Turkey	118 kg
Total	Anastasiya Shvabauer; Kazakhstan	224 kg	Jenny Arthur; United States	214 kg	Johanie Filiatrault; Canada	212 kg
+75 kg
Snatch	Gladis Bueno; Mexico	110 kg	Halima Abdelazim; Egypt	109 kg	Marissa Klingseis; United States	104 kg
Clean & Jerk	Gladis Bueno; Mexico	133 kg	Halima Abdelazim; Egypt	131 kg	Marissa Klingseis; United States	125 kg
Total	Gladis Bueno; Mexico	243 kg	Halima Abdelazim; Egypt	240 kg	Marissa Klingseis; United States	229 kg
