= Muammer Şahin =

Turkish weightlifter (born 1994)

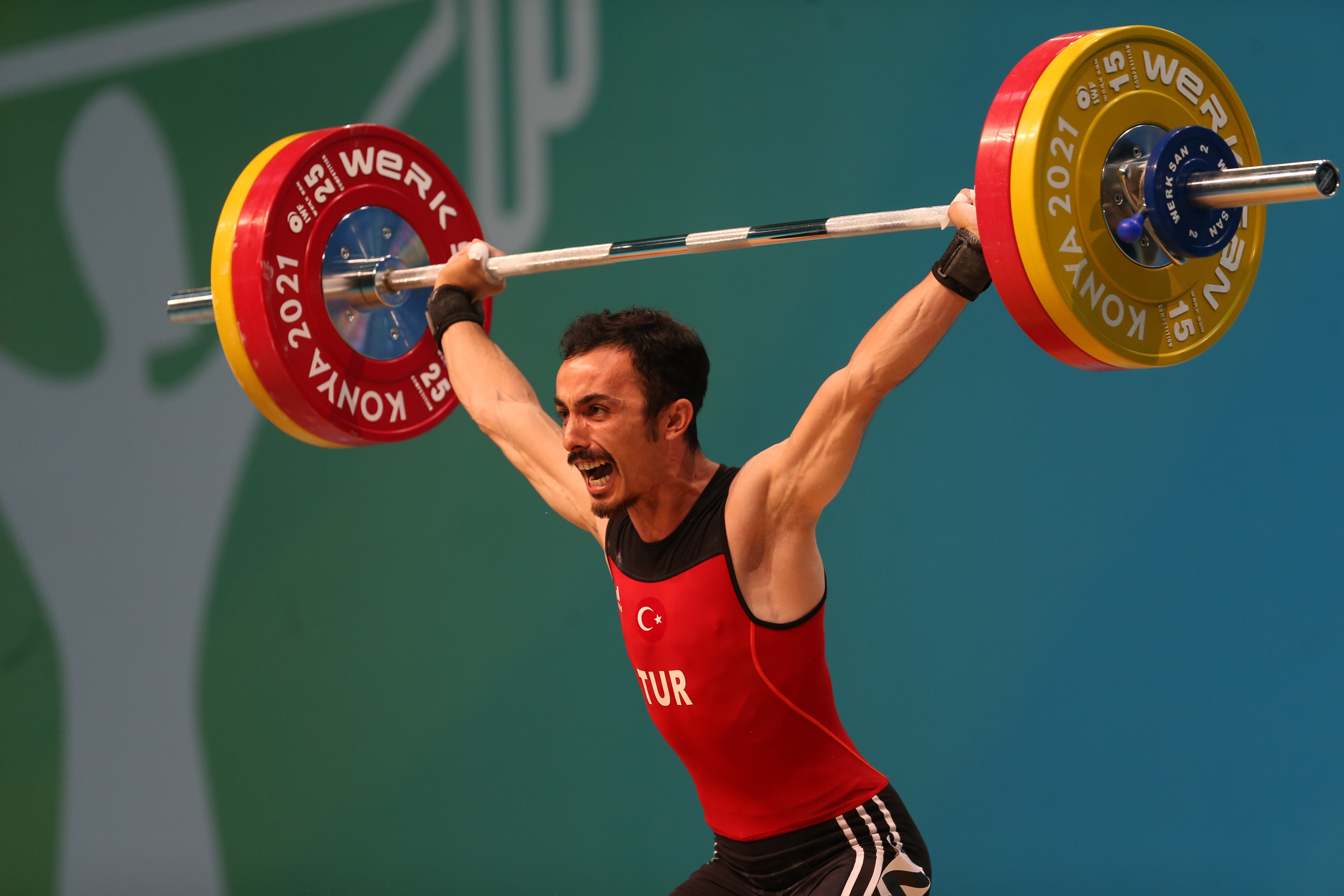

Personal information
- Nationality: Turkish
- Born: 5 February 1994 (age 32) Kayseri, Turkey
- Weight: 55 kg (121 lb)

Sport
- Country: Turkey
- Sport: Weightlifting
- Event: 55–kg
Medal record
Men's weightlifting
Representing Turkey
European Championships
| Bronze medal – third place | 2019 Batumi | 55 kg |
Junior World Championships
| Bronze medal – third place | 2013 Lima | 56 kg |

Muammer Şahin (born 5 February 1994) is a Turkish weight lifter competing in the 55 kg division.

== Personal life ==
Muammer Şahin was born in Kayseri, Turkey on 5 February 1994.

== Sport career ==
Şahin won the gold medal in the snatch event and the bronze medal in total at the 56 kg division of the 2013 Junior World Weightlifting Championships held in Lima, Peru. In the 55 kg division of the 2019 European Weightlifting Championships in Batumi, Georgia, he took the silver medal in the snatch and the bronze medal in the clean & jerk event, winning the bronze medal in total. In 2021, he captured the silver medal in the 55 kg snatch event at the European Weightlifting Championships in Moscow, Russia. He took the bronze medal in the 55 kg snatch event at the 2021 World Weightlifting Championships in Tashkent, Uzbekistan. He received the silver medal in the 55 kg snatch event at the 2023 European Weightlifting Championships in Yerevan, Armenia. He won the gold medal in the 55 kg snatch event at the 2024 European Weightlifting Championships in Sofia, Bulgaria.

== Achievements ==
| Year | Competition | Venue | Weight | Snatch | | Clean & Jerk | | Total | |
| Year | Competition | Venue | Weight | (kg) | Rank | (kg) | Rank | (kg) | Rank |
|---|---|---|---|---|---|---|---|---|---|
| 2013 | Junior World Championships | Lima, Peru | 56 kg | 107 | 1st place, gold medalist(s) | 126 | 8th | 233 | 3rd place, bronze medalist(s) |
| 2019 | European Championships | (Georgia (country)) Batumi, Georgia | 55 kg | 112; NR | 2nd place, silver medalist(s) | 135 | 3rd place, bronze medalist(s) | 247 | 3rd place, bronze medalist(s) |
| 2021 | European Championships | Moscow, Russia | 55 kg | 112 | 2nd place, silver medalist(s) | 130 | 5th | 242 | 4th |
| 2021 | World Championships | Tashkent, Uzbekistan | 55 kg | 116 | 3rd place, bronze medalist(s) | 127 | 12th | 243 | 6th |
| 2023 | European Championships | Yerevan, Armenia | 55 kg | 112 | 2nd place, silver medalist(s) | 130 | 5th | 242 | 4th |
| 2024 | European Championships | Sofia, Bulgaria | 55 kg | 112 | 1st place, gold medalist(s) | 121 | 9th | 233 | 5th |
| 2025 | European Championships | Chișinău, Moldova | 55 kg | 109 | 4th | 120 | 12th | 229 | 9th |
