= 2015 Junior World Weightlifting Championships =

International weightlifting competition

- Venue: Hala Orbita
- Location: Wrocław, Poland
- Dates: 6–13 June 2015
- Competitors: 236 from 42 nations

The 2015 Junior World Weightlifting Championships were held in Hala Orbita, Wrocław, Poland from 6 to 13 June 2015.

== Medal table ==
Ranking by Big (Total result) medals

* Host nation (Poland)

Rank	Nation	Gold	Silver	Bronze	Total
1	China (CHN)	7	3	0	10
2	Russia (RUS)	3	2	0	5
3	Thailand (THA)	1	3	0	4
4	North Korea (PRK)	1	0	3	4
5	Armenia (ARM)	1	0	0	1
5	Colombia (COL)	1	0	0	1
5	Kazakhstan (KAZ)	1	0	0	1
8	Egypt (EGY)	0	2	1	3
9	Belarus (BLR)	0	2	0	2
10	Iran (IRI)	0	1	1	2
10	Ukraine (UKR)	0	1	1	2
12	Uzbekistan (UZB)	0	1	0	1
13	Italy (ITA)	0	0	2	2
14	Canada (CAN)	0	0	1	1
14	Japan (JPN)	0	0	1	1
14	Romania (ROU)	0	0	1	1
14	South Korea (KOR)	0	0	1	1
14	Tunisia (TUN)	0	0	1	1
14	Turkey (TUR)	0	0	1	1
14	Vietnam (VIE)	0	0	1	1
Totals (20 entries)		15	15	15	45

Ranking by all medals: Big (Total result) and Small (Snatch and Clean & Jerk)

* Host nation (Poland)

Rank	Nation	Gold	Silver	Bronze	Total
1	China (CHN)	17	13	0	30
2	Russia (RUS)	9	6	3	18
3	Thailand (THA)	4	6	2	12
4	North Korea (PRK)	3	0	8	11
5	Colombia (COL)	3	0	2	5
6	Kazakhstan (KAZ)	3	0	0	3
7	Armenia (ARM)	2	0	0	2
8	Egypt (EGY)	1	4	3	8
9	Ukraine (UKR)	1	4	1	6
10	Iran (IRI)	1	2	3	6
11	Vietnam (VIE)	1	1	1	3
12	Belarus (BLR)	0	5	1	6
13	Uzbekistan (UZB)	0	3	1	4
14	Italy (ITA)	0	1	5	6
15	South Korea (KOR)	0	0	3	3
16	Canada (CAN)	0	0	2	2
16	Mexico (MEX)	0	0	2	2
16	Romania (ROU)	0	0	2	2
16	Turkey (TUR)	0	0	2	2
20	Chinese Taipei (TPE)	0	0	1	1
20	Japan (JPN)	0	0	1	1
20	Latvia (LAT)	0	0	1	1
20	Tunisia (TUN)	0	0	1	1
Totals (23 entries)		45	45	45	135

== Medal summary ==
=== Men ===
Event	Gold		Silver		Bronze	
56 kg
Snatch	Sinphet Kruaithong (THA)	126 kg	Meng Cheng (CHN)	126 kg	Mirco Scarantino (ITA)	117 kg
Clean & Jerk	Meng Cheng (CHN)	150 kg	Witoon Mingmoon (THA)	146 kg	Mirco Scarantino (ITA)	145 kg
Total	Meng Cheng (CHN)	276 kg	Sinphet Kruaithong (THA)	268 kg	Mirco Scarantino (ITA)	262 kg
62 kg
Snatch	Pak Jong-ju (PRK)	124 kg	Adkhamjon Ergashev (UZB)	124 kg	Emrah Aydın (TUR)	122 kg
Clean & Jerk	Pak Jong-ju (PRK)	156 kg	Adkhamjon Ergashev (UZB)	151 kg	Pongsakorn Nondara (THA)	146 kg
Total	Pak Jong-ju (PRK)	280 kg	Adkhamjon Ergashev (UZB)	275 kg	Emrah Aydın (TUR)	267 kg
69 kg
Snatch	Luis Javier Mosquera (COL)	151 kg	Yuan Chengfei (CHN)	151 kg	Kwon Yong-gwang (PRK)	141 kg
Clean & Jerk	Luis Javier Mosquera (COL)	187 kg	Yuan Chengfei (CHN)	178 kg	Kwon Yong-gwang (PRK)	171 kg
Total	Luis Javier Mosquera (COL)	338 kg	Yuan Chengfei (CHN)	329 kg	Kwon Yong-gwang (PRK)	312 kg
77 kg
Snatch	Andranik Karapetyan (ARM)	155 kg	Ali Miri (IRI)	150 kg	Doru Ilie Stoian (ROU)	148 kg
Clean & Jerk	Ali Miri (IRI)	182 kg	Roman Chepik (RUS)	180 kg	Jhor Moreno (COL)	180 kg
Total	Andranik Karapetyan (ARM)	335 kg	Ali Miri (IRI)	332 kg	Doru Ilie Stoian (ROU)	326 kg
85 kg
Snatch	Ilia Atnabaev (RUS)	161 kg	Zhao Yongchao (CHN)	156 kg	Antonino Pizzolato (ITA)	154 kg
Clean & Jerk	Zhao Yongchao (CHN)	197 kg	Antonino Pizzolato (ITA)	193 kg	Ilia Atnabaev (RUS)	191 kg
Total	Zhao Yongchao (CHN)	353 kg	Ilia Atnabaev (RUS)	352 kg	Antonino Pizzolato (ITA)	347 kg
94 kg
Snatch	Volodymyr Hoza (UKR)	173 kg	Khetag Khugaev (RUS)	172 kg	Lesman Paredes (COL)	165 kg
Clean & Jerk	Khetag Khugaev (RUS)	202 kg	Volodymyr Hoza (UKR)	193 kg	Jin Yun-seong (KOR)	191 kg
Total	Khetag Khugaev (RUS)	374 kg	Volodymyr Hoza (UKR)	366 kg	Jin Yun-seong (KOR)	356 kg
105 kg
Snatch	Wu Changsheng (CHN)	169 kg	Marchel Guydya (RUS)	168 kg	Peyman Jan (IRI)	164 kg
Clean & Jerk	Wu Changsheng (CHN)	212 kg	Marchel Guydya (RUS)	211 kg	Peyman Jan (IRI)	203 kg
Total	Wu Changsheng (CHN)	381 kg	Marchel Guydya (RUS)	379 kg	Peyman Jan (IRI)	367 kg
+105 kg
Snatch	Antoniy Savchuk (RUS)	186 kg	Aliaksei Mzhachyk (BLR)	181 kg	Davron Kenjaev (UZB)	173 kg
Clean & Jerk	Antoniy Savchuk (RUS)	229 kg	Aliaksei Mzhachyk (BLR)	220 kg	Lee Yang-jae (KOR)	206 kg
Total	Antoniy Savchuk (RUS)	415 kg	Aliaksei Mzhachyk (BLR)	401 kg	Eishiro Murakami (JPN)	375 kg

=== Women ===
Event	Gold		Silver		Bronze	
48 kg
Snatch	Jiang Huihua (CHN)	92 kg	Hou Zhihui (CHN)	91 kg	Ri Song-gum (PRK)	77 kg
Clean & Jerk	Hou Zhihui (CHN)	113 kg	Jiang Huihua (CHN)	113 kg	Ri Song-gum (PRK)	104 kg
Total	Jiang Huihua (CHN)	205 kg	Hou Zhihui (CHN)	204 kg	Ri Song-gum (PRK)	181 kg
53 kg
Snatch	Liu Quan (CHN)	95 kg	Nguyễn Thị Hương (VIE)	86 kg	Rebeka Koha (LAT)	85 kg
Clean & Jerk	Rattanaphon Pakkaratha (THA)	115 kg	Liu Quan (CHN)	115 kg	Basma Ibrahim (EGY)	106 kg
Total	Liu Quan (CHN)	210 kg	Rattanaphon Pakkaratha (THA)	198 kg	Basma Ibrahim (EGY)	189 kg
58 kg
Snatch	Sukanya Srisurat (THA)	105 kg	Zhou Jun (CHN)	96 kg	Rim Un-sim (PRK)	95 kg
Clean & Jerk	Zhou Jun (CHN)	128 kg	Sukanya Srisurat (THA)	125 kg	Chiang Nien-hsin (TPE)	116 kg
Total	Sukanya Srisurat (THA)	230 kg	Zhou Jun (CHN)	224 kg	Rim Un-sim (PRK)	210 kg
63 kg
Snatch	Esraa El-Sayed (EGY)	99 kg	Wei Lufan (CHN)	98 kg	Anacarmen Torres (MEX)	93 kg
Clean & Jerk	Nguyễn Thị Tuyết Ma (VIE)	121 kg	Wei Lufan (CHN)	120 kg	Ana Lilia Durán (MEX)	116 kg
Total	Wei Lufan (CHN)	218 kg	Esraa El-Sayed (EGY)	214 kg	Nguyễn Thị Tuyết Ma (VIE)	212 kg
69 kg
Snatch	Wang Jie (CHN)	103 kg	Sara Ahmed (EGY)	102 kg	Kristel Ngarlem (CAN)	93 kg
Clean & Jerk	Wang Jie (CHN)	131 kg	Sara Ahmed (EGY)	130 kg	Svetlana Shcherbakova (RUS)	127 kg
Total	Wang Jie (CHN)	234 kg	Sara Ahmed (EGY)	232 kg	Kristel Ngarlem (CAN)	209 kg
75 kg
Snatch	Mariia Petrova (RUS)	110 kg	Iryna Dekha (UKR)	109 kg	Anastasiya Mikhalenka (BLR)	101 kg
Clean & Jerk	Mariia Petrova (RUS)	136 kg	Anastasiya Mikhalenka (BLR)	130 kg	Ani Sargsian (RUS)	122 kg
Total	Mariia Petrova (RUS)	246 kg	Anastasiya Mikhalenka (BLR)	231 kg	Iryna Dekha (UKR)	224 kg
+75 kg
Snatch	Nadezhda Nogay (KAZ)	125 kg	Anastasiya Lysenko (UKR)	121 kg	Duangaksorn Chaidee (THA)	113 kg
Clean & Jerk	Nadezhda Nogay (KAZ)	150 kg	Duangaksorn Chaidee (THA)	146 kg	Halima Abbas (EGY)	141 kg
Total	Nadezhda Nogay (KAZ)	275 kg	Duangaksorn Chaidee (THA)	259 kg	Yosra Dhieb (TUN)	251 kg
