= Selimkhan Abubakarov =

Kazakhstani weightlifter (born 1997)

Personal information
- Born: 18 February 1997 (age 28)
- Weight: 144.66 kg (318.9 lb)

Sport
- Country: Kazakhstan
- Sport: Weightlifting
- Team: National Team
- Updated on 4 September 2016

Selimkhan Abubakarov (born 18 February 1997) is a Kazakhstani male weightlifter, competing in the +105 kg category and representing Kazakhstan at international competitions. He competed at both World Youth championships and World championships, most recently at the 2014 World Weightlifting Championships.

== Major results ==
Year	Venue	Weight	Snatch (kg)				Clean & Jerk (kg)				Total	Rank
Year	Venue	Weight	1	2	3	Rank	1	2	3	Rank	Total	Rank
World Championships
2014	Houston, United States	+105 kg	~~175~~	~~175~~	175	18	205	210	~~215~~	21	385	19
2013	Wrocław, Poland	+105 kg	162	170	~~175~~	16	192	~~200~~	200	18	370	16
