= Fatih Baydar =

Turkish weightlifter (born 1983)

Personal information
- Nationality: Turkish
- Born: November 25, 1983 (age 42) Konya, Turkey
- Height: 1.77 m (5 ft 10 in)
- Weight: 85 kg (187 lb; 13.4 st)

Sport
- Country: Turkey
- Sport: Weightlifting
- Event: –85 kg
Medal record
European Championships
Silver medal – second place	2012 Antalya	–85 kg

Fatih Baydar (pronounced [ˈfatih ˈbajdaɾ]; born November 25, 1983) is a Turkish weightlifter competing in the –85 kg division.

At the 2012 European Championships held in Antalya, Turkey, he became a silver medalist.

He was due to compete at the 2012 Olympic Games but was withdrawn after his A-sample tested positive for hydroxystanozolol during a drug test. He was suspended for 2 years.

== Achievements ==
Rank			Competition	Host	Result
S	C	T	Competition	Host	Result
Gold medal	4	Silver medal	2012 European Championships	(Turkey) Antalya	166+193=359
