= Lewis Chua =

Singaporean weightlifter

Personal information
- Full name: Lewis Yong Hwee Chua
- Born: 28 August 1991 (age 35)
- Weight: 139.93 kg (308.5 lb)

Sport
- Country: Singapore
- Sport: Weightlifting
- Team: National team
- Updated on 14 January 2018

Lewis Chua Yong Hwee (born 28 August 1991) is a Singaporean male weightlifter, competing in the +105 kg category and representing Singapore at international competitions. He competed at world championships, most recently at the 2013 World Weightlifting Championships.

Chua qualified for the 2014 Commonwealth Games after lifting a total of 312kg at the Singapore National Open.

During the 2014 Commonwealth Games, Chua broke Singapore clean-and-jerk record of 180kg with 182kg. Chua lifted 133kg in the snatch, recording a total of 315kg total to be placed 10th.

== Major results ==
Year	Venue	Weight	Snatch (kg)				Clean & Jerk (kg)				Total	Rank
Year	Venue	Weight	1	2	3	Rank	1	2	3	Rank	Total	Rank
World Championships
2013	Wrocław, Poland	+105 kg	~~126~~	126	~~130~~	23	~~160~~	160	~~168~~	23	286	22
Commonwealth Games
2014	Glasgow, Scotland	+105 kg	127	133	~~136~~	12	175	182	~~185~~	7	315	10
