= Péter Nagy (weightlifter) =

Hungarian weightlifter (born 1986)

Personal information
- Nationality: Hungarian
- Born: 16 January 1986 (age 40) Komárom, Hungary
- Height: 1.92 m (6 ft 4 in)
- Weight: 157 kg (346 lb)

Sport
- Sport: Weightlifting
- Event: +105 kg
Medal record
Men's weightlifting
Representing Hungary
European Championships
Bronze medal – third place	2018 Bucharest	+105 kg
Universiade
Gold medal – first place	2011 Shenzhen	+105 kg
- Updated on 7 October 2019

Péter Nagy (born 16 January 1986) is a Hungarian weightlifter. He competed at the 2012 Summer Olympics in the +105 kg event. Nagy won a bronze medal in the +105 kg snatch at the 2012 European Weightlifting Championships and a gold medal at the 2011 Summer Universiade (he was second after the competition but received the gold when Mohamed Masoud was disqualified).

== Major results ==
Year	Venue	Weight	Snatch (kg)				Clean & Jerk (kg)				Total	Rank
Year	Venue	Weight	1	2	3	Rank	1	2	3	Rank	Total	Rank
Representing Hungary
Olympic Games
2021	Tokyo, Japan	+109 kg	165	173	178	9	206	214	218	7	396	7
2016	Rio de Janeiro, Brazil	+105 kg	182	188	193	8	218	227	~~234~~	11	420	10
2012	(United Kingdom) London, Great Britain	+105 kg	184	191	~~196~~	9	216	225	~~230~~	11	416	11
World Championships
2021	Tashkent, Uzbekistan	+109 kg	172	~~177~~	—	17	212	218	~~222~~	16	390	16
2019	Pattaya, Thailand	+109 kg	176	~~181~~	~~182~~	18	215	221	~~225~~	19	397	19
2018	Ashgabat, Turkmenistan	+109 kg	182	~~187~~	187	11	220	226	~~234~~	11	413	10
2017	Anaheim, United States	+105 kg	183	188	~~192~~	9	219	226	~~233~~	9	414	10
2015	Houston, United States	+105 kg	185	~~191~~	~~191~~	17	217	~~228~~	~~228~~	22	402	17
2014	Almaty, Kazakhstan	+105 kg	185	~~189~~	~~189~~	12	216	222	~~227~~	12	407	11
2013	Wrocław, Poland	+105 kg	~~185~~	185	191	4	220	~~227~~	~~228~~	10	411	6
2011	Paris, France	+105 kg	186	192	~~196~~	5	215	223	~~226~~	10	415	8
2010	Antalya, Turkey	+105 kg	183	~~190~~	~~191~~	14	~~212~~	212	~~218~~	18	395	15
2007	Chiang Mai, Thailand	+105 kg	162	170	173	16	~~198~~	~~198~~	~~198~~	—	—	—
2006	Santo Domingo, Dominican Republic	+105 kg	161	167	~~172~~	15	195	~~203~~	~~203~~	21	362	17
European Championships
2022	Tirana, Albania	+109 kg	165	~~172~~	~~172~~	11	205	~~211~~	211	8	376	8
2021	Moscow, Russia	+109 kg	~~176~~	176	182	8	216	222	~~229~~	8	404	8
2019	(Georgia (country)) Batumi, Georgia	+109 kg	180	185	~~188~~	7	210	219	~~223~~	9	404	9
2018	Bucharest, Romania	+105 kg	182	187	191	3rd place, bronze medalist(s)	215	221	225	4	416	3rd place, bronze medalist(s)
2017	Split, Croatia	+105 kg	176	181	~~185~~	8	215	220	224	6	405	6
2016	Førde, Norway	+105 kg	183	188	~~192~~	5	217	226	~~234~~	6	414	6
2015	(Georgia (country)) Tbilisi, Georgia	+105 kg	184	~~189~~	189	4	215	223	228	4	417	5
2014	Tel Aviv, Israel	+105 kg	185	~~191~~	~~192~~	8	221	226	~~231~~	7	411	7
2013	Tirana, Albania	+105 kg	182	186	190	4	212	219	~~223~~	7	409	6
2012	Antalya, Turkey	+105 kg	~~184~~	184	192	3rd place, bronze medalist(s)	212	220	~~229~~	8	412	7
2010	Minsk, Belarus	+105 kg	178	~~184~~	~~184~~	8	205	213	~~221~~	8	391	8
2009	Bucharest, Romania	+105 kg	175	182	188	4	205	212	220	6	408	5
2008	Lignano Sabbiadoro, Italy	+105 kg	165	172	177	9	195	203	~~208~~	10	380	10
2007	Strasbourg, France	+105 kg	165	172	~~175~~	9	197	204	~~210~~	10	376	8
Universiade
2013	Kazan, Russia	+105 kg	~~183~~	183	~~190~~	5	215	223	226	4	409	4
2011	Shenzhen, China	+105 kg	180	187	192	1	213	220	~~227~~	1	412	1st place, gold medalist(s)
