= 2012 European Weightlifting Championships =

International weightlifting competition

- Venue: Kepez Basket Hall
- Location: Antalya, Turkey
- Dates: 9–15 April
- Competitors: 257 from 36 nations

The 2012 European Weightlifting Championships was held at Kepez Basket Hall in Antalya, Turkey from 9 April to 15 April 2012. It was the 91st edition of the event.

== Doping ==
+ Doping test:

13 weightlifters (one or multiple prohibited anabolic steroids):

1. Hysen Pulaku (Albania)
2. Hanna Batsiushka (Belarus)
3. Dimitris Minasidis (Cyprus)
4. Irakli Turmanidze (Georgia)
5. Rauli Tsirekidze (Georgia)
6. Cristina Iovu (Moldova)
7. Florin Ionut Croitoru (Romania)
8. Razvan Constantin Martin (Romania)
9. Oxana Slivenko (Russia)
10. Gokhan Kilic (Turkey)
11. Bunyami Sezer (Turkey)
12. Hatice Yilmaz (Turkey)
13. Fatih Baydar (Turkey)

After retesting of samples and investigation into irregularities at the Moscow testing lab the following were disqualified in 2022.

- Valentin Hristov (Azerbaijan)
- Alan Bideev (Russia)
- Ruslan Albegov (Russia)
- Maxim Sheyko (Russia)
- Andrey Kozlov (Russia)
- Olga Zubova (Russia)

== Medals tables ==
Ranking by all medals: "Big" (Total result) and "Small" (Snatch and Clean&Jerk)

After doping:

Rank	Nation	Gold	Silver	Bronze	Total
1	Russia (RUS)	11	8	12	31
2	Azerbaijan (AZE)	7	3	5	15
3	Moldova (MDA)	3	6	2	11
4	Turkey (TUR)	3	5	5	13
5	Poland (POL)	3	1	1	5
6	Bulgaria (BUL)	2	0	2	4
7	Spain (ESP)	1	2	0	3
8	Albania (ALB)	1	1	1	3
9	Germany (GER)	1	1	0	2
10	Romania (ROU)	0	3	4	7
11	Hungary (HUN)	0	3	1	4
12	France (FRA)	0	2	2	4
13	Belarus (BLR)	0	1	1	2
14	Armenia (ARM)	0	1	0	1
14	Czech Republic (CZE)	0	1	0	1
14	Italy (ITA)	0	1	0	1
17	Ukraine (UKR)	0	0	2	2
18	Cyprus (CYP)	0	0	0	0
18	Georgia (GEO)	0	0	0	0
Totals (19 entries)		32	39	38	109

Ranking by "Big" (Total result) medals

Rank	Nation	Gold	Silver	Bronze	Total
1	Russia (RUS)	4	3	3	10
2	Azerbaijan (AZE)	3	0	2	5
3	Turkey (TUR)	1	2	2	5
4	Moldova (MDA)	1	2	1	4
5	Bulgaria (BUL)	1	0	0	1
5	Poland (POL)	1	0	0	1
7	France (FRA)	0	1	1	2
7	Romania (ROU)	0	1	1	2
9	Albania (ALB)	0	1	0	1
9	Germany (GER)	0	1	0	1
9	Hungary (HUN)	0	1	0	1
9	Spain (ESP)	0	1	0	1
13	Belarus (BLR)	0	0	1	1
13	Ukraine (UKR)	0	0	1	1
15	Cyprus (CYP)	0	0	0	0
15	Georgia (GEO)	0	0	0	0
Totals (16 entries)		11	13	12	36

== Schedule ==
The competition days were split in A and B groups.

Date	Time	Round
9 April 2012	11:30	Women's 48 kg Group B
9 April 2012	14:00	Men's 56 kg Group B
9 April 2012	16:30	Opening ceremony
9 April 2012	17:30	Women's 48 kg Group A
9 April 2012	20:00	Men's 56 kg Group A
10 April 2012	11:30	Women's 53 kg Group B
10 April 2012	15:00	Men's 62 kg Group B
10 April 2012	17:30	Women's 53 kg Group A
10 April 2012	20:00	Men's 62 kg Group A
11 April 2012	11:30	Women's 58 kg Group B
11 April 2012	15:00	Men's 69 kg Group B
11 April 2012	17:30	Women's 58 kg Group A
11 April 2012	20:00	Men's 69 kg Group A
12 April 2012	11:30	Women's 63 kg Group B
12 April 2012	15:00	Men's 77 kg Group B
12 April 2012	17:30	Women's 63 kg Group A
12 April 2012	20:00	Men's 77 kg Group A

Date	Time	Round
13 April 2012	10:00	Women's 69 kg Group B
13 April 2012	11:45	Men's 94 kg Group B
13 April 2012	14:30	Men's 85 kg Group B
13 April 2012	17:30	Women's 69 kg Group A
13 April 2012	20:00	Men's 85 kg Group A
14 April 2012	10:00	Women's 75 kg/+ 75 kg Group B
14 April 2012	11:30	Men's 105 kg Group B
14 April 2012	14:30	Women's 75 kg Group A
14 April 2012	17:30	Men's 94 kg Group A
14 April 2012	20:00	Men's 105 kg Group A
15 April 2012	10:00	Men's + 105 kg Group B
15 April 2012	13:00	Women's + 75 kg Group A
15 April 2012	15:30	Men's + 105 kg Group A

== Medal overview ==
=== Men ===
Event		Gold		Silver		Bronze	
– 56 kg	Snatch	~~Valentin Hristov~~ (AZE)	125 kg	~~Gökhan Kılıç (TUR)~~	121 kg	Oleg Sîrghi (MDA)	116 kg
– 56 kg	Clean & Jerk	~~Valentin Hristov~~ (AZE)	155 kg	Oleg Sîrghi (MDA)	146 kg	Asen Muradov (BUL)	136 kg
– 56 kg	Total	~~Valentin Hristov~~ (AZE)	280 kg	Oleg Sîrghi (MDA)	262 kg	~~Gökhan Kılıç (TUR)~~	257 kg
– 62 kg	Snatch	~~Bünyamin Sezer (TUR)~~	142 kg	Florin Croitoru (ROU)	131 kg	~~Dimitris Minasidis (CYP)~~	130 kg
– 62 kg	Clean & Jerk	Stoyan Enev (BUL)	160 kg	~~Bünyamin Sezer (TUR)~~	159 kg	~~Dimitris Minasidis (CYP)~~	158 kg
– 62 kg	Total	~~Bünyamin Sezer (TUR)~~	301 kg	~~Dimitris Minasidis (CYP)~~	288 kg	Stoyan Enev (BUL)	282 kg
– 69 kg	Snatch	Oleg Chen (RUS)	158 kg	Bernardin Matam (FRA)	145 kg	Daniel Godelli (ALB)	145 kg
– 69 kg	Clean & Jerk	Afgan Bayramov (AZE)	178 kg	Sergei Cechir (MDA)	175 kg	Vencelas Dabaya (FRA)	175 kg
– 69 kg	Total	Afgan Bayramov (AZE)	321 kg	Vencelas Dabaya (FRA)	318 kg	Bernardin Matam (FRA)	318 kg
– 77 kg	Snatch	~~Răzvan Martin (ROU)~~	159 kg	Alexandru Dudoglo (MDA)	158 kg	Dmitry Ivanenko (RUS)	155 kg
– 77 kg	Clean & Jerk	~~Răzvan Martin (ROU)~~	188 kg	Alexandr Spac (MDA)	187 kg	Semih Yağcı (TUR)	186 kg
– 77 kg	Total	~~Răzvan Martin (ROU)~~	347 kg	Alexandru Dudoglo (MDA)	345 kg	Alexandr Spac (MDA)	340 kg
– 85 kg	Snatch	~~Fatih Baydar (TUR)~~	166 kg	~~Rauli Tsirekidze (GEO)~~	165 kg	Gabriel Sîncrăian (ROM)	164 kg
– 85 kg	Clean & Jerk	Tom Schwarzbach (GER)	201 kg	~~Rauli Tsirekidze (GEO)~~	200 kg	Gabriel Sîncrăian (ROM)	195 kg
– 85 kg	Total	~~Rauli Tsirekidze (GEO)~~	365 kg	~~Fatih Baydar (TUR)~~	359 kg	Gabriel Sîncrăian (ROM)	359 kg
– 94 kg	Snatch	Anatolie Cîrîcu (MDA)	178 kg	Ibrahim Arat (TUR)	171 kg	~~Aslan Bideev~~ (RUS)	170 kg
– 94 kg	Clean & Jerk	Anatolie Cîrîcu (MDA)	224 kg	Intigam Zairov (AZE)	213 kg	~~Aslan Bideev~~ (RUS)	212 kg
– 94 kg	Total	Anatolie Cîrîcu (MDA)	402 kg	~~Aslan Bideev~~ (RUS)	382 kg	Ibrahim Arat (TUR)	380 kg
– 105 kg	Snatch	~~Maxim Sheyko~~ (RUS)	185 kg	David Bedzhanyan (RUS)	185 kg	Serhiy Tahirov (UKR)	180 kg
– 105 kg	Clean & Jerk	David Bedzhanyan (RUS)	220 kg	~~Maxim Sheyko~~ (RUS)	216 kg	Arkadiusz Michalski (POL)	212 kg
– 105 kg	Total	David Bedzhanyan (RUS)	405 kg	~~Maxim Sheyko~~ (RUS)	401 kg	Serhiy Tahirov (UKR)	390 kg
+ 105 kg	Snatch	~~Irakli Turmanidze (GEO)~~	195 kg	Hayk Hakobyan (ARM)	195 kg	Peter Nagy (HUN)	192 kg
+ 105 kg	Clean & Jerk	~~Ruslan Albegov~~ (RUS)	238 kg	Jiří Orság (CZE)	235 kg	~~Andrey Kozlov~~ (RUS)	235 kg
+ 105 kg	Total	~~Ruslan Albegov~~ (RUS)	429 kg	Matthias Steiner (GER)	424 kg	~~Irakli Turmanidze (GEO)~~	423 kg

=== Women ===
Event		Gold		Silver		Bronze	
– 48 kg	Snatch	Marzena Karpińska (POL)	85 kg	Genny Pagliaro (ITA)	81 kg	Silviya Angelova (AZE)	78 kg
– 48 kg	Clean & Jerk	Marzena Karpińska (POL)	102 kg	Nurdan Karagöz (TUR)	100 kg	Silviya Angelova (AZE)	97 kg
– 48 kg	Total	Marzena Karpińska (POL)	187 kg	Nurdan Karagöz (TUR)	177 kg	Silviya Angelova (AZE)	175 kg
– 53 kg	Snatch	~~Cristina Iovu (MDA)~~	91 kg	Alena Chychkan (BLR)	88 kg	Aylin Daşdelen (TUR)	88 kg
– 53 kg	Clean & Jerk	~~Cristina Iovu (MDA)~~	116 kg	Aylin Daşdelen (TUR)	113 kg	Svetlana Cheremshanova (RUS)	113 kg
– 53 kg	Total	~~Cristina Iovu (MDA)~~	207 kg	Aylin Daşdelen (TUR)	201 kg	Svetlana Cheremshanova (RUS)	201 kg
– 58 kg	Snatch	Romela Begaj (ALB)	102 kg	Boyanka Kostova (AZE)	98 kg	Yelena Shadrina (RUS)	95 kg
– 58 kg	Clean & Jerk	Boyanka Kostova (AZE)	117 kg	Aleksandra Klejnowska (POL)	117 kg	Yelena Shadrina (RUS)	116 kg
– 58 kg	Total	Boyanka Kostova (AZE)	215 kg	Romela Begaj (ALB)	215 kg	Yelena Shadrina (RUS)	211 kg
– 63 kg	Snatch	Sibel Şimşek (TUR)	100 kg	Nikoletta Nagy (HUN)	94 kg	Liudmila Bril (BLR)	93 kg
– 63 kg	Clean & Jerk	Sibel Şimşek (TUR)	125 kg	Nikoletta Nagy (HUN)	116 kg	Neslihan Okumuş (TUR)	115 kg
– 63 kg	Total	Sibel Şimşek (TUR)	225 kg	Nikoletta Nagy (HUN)	210 kg	Neslihan Okumuş (TUR)	208 kg
– 69 kg	Snatch	~~Oksana Slivenko (RUS)~~	115 kg	Viktoriya Savenko (RUS)	115 kg	Roxana Cocoș (ROU)	110 kg
– 69 kg	Clean & Jerk	~~Oksana Slivenko (RUS)~~	143 kg	Roxana Cocoș (ROU)	142 kg	Viktoriya Savenko (RUS)	137 kg
– 69 kg	Total	~~Oksana Slivenko (RUS)~~	258 kg	Roxana Cocoș (ROU)	252 kg	Viktoriya Savenko (RUS)	252 kg
– 75 kg	Snatch	Lydia Valentín (ESP)	117 kg	Olga Zubova (RUS)	115 kg	Rumyana Petkova (BUL)	100 kg
– 75 kg	Clean & Jerk	Olga Zubova (RUS)	150 kg	Lydia Valentín (ESP)	143 kg	~~Hatice Yılmaz (TUR)~~	125 kg
– 75 kg	Total	Olga Zubova (RUS)	265 kg	Lydia Valentín (ESP)	260 kg	~~Hatice Yılmaz (TUR)~~	223 kg
+ 75 kg	Snatch	Tatiana Kashirina (RUS)	145 kg	Yuliya Dovhal (AZE)	123 kg	Julia Konovalova (RUS)	121 kg
+ 75 kg	Clean & Jerk	Tatiana Kashirina (RUS)	183 kg	Julia Konovalova (RUS)	153 kg	Yuliya Dovhal (AZE)	150 kg
+ 75 kg	Total	Tatiana Kashirina (RUS)	328 kg	Julia Konovalova (RUS)	274 kg	Yuliya Dovhal (AZE)	273 kg

== Participating countries ==
275 athletes from 36 countries will participate in the championship.

- Albania (12)
- Armenia (3)
- Azerbaijan (8)
- Belarus (8)
- Belgium (1)
- Bosnia and Herzegovina (1)
- Bulgaria (14)
- Croatia (5)
- Cyprus (2)
- Czech Republic (12)
- Denmark (2)
- Estonia (2)
- Finland (12)
- France (12)
- Georgia (4)
- Germany (11)
- Greece (14)
- Hungary (10)
- Ireland (6)
- Israel (2)
- Italy (15)
- Kosovo (1)
- Latvia (3)
- Lithuania (8)
- Moldova (10)
- Netherlands (1)
- Norway (1)
- Poland (15)
- Romania (10)
- Russia (15)
- Slovakia (10)
- Spain (10)
- Sweden (5)
- Turkey (15)
- Ukraine (1)
- United Kingdom (12)
