= Bahador Molaei =

Iranian weightlifter (born 1992)

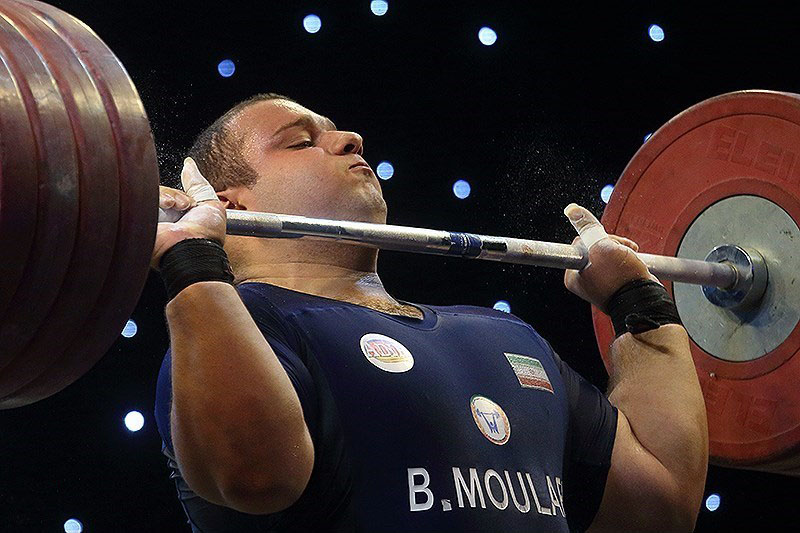

Personal information
- Nationality: Iran
- Born: March 21, 1992 (age 34)
- Height: 175 cm (5 ft 9 in)
- Weight: 146.80 kg (323.6 lb)

Sport
- Country: Iran
- Sport: Weightlifting
- Event: +105 kg

Achievements and titles
- Personal bests: Snatch: 203 kg (2013); Clean and jerk: 255 kg (2013); Total: 458 kg (2013)
Medal record
Representing Iran
Men's weightlifting
World Championships
| Silver medal – second place | 2013 Wrocław | +105 kg |
Asian Championships
| Silver medal – second place | 2011 Tongling | +105 kg |
| Silver medal – second place | 2015 Phuket | +105 kg |
| Bronze medal – third place | 2016 Tashkent | +105 kg |
Summer Universiade
| Silver medal – second place | 2013 Kazan | +105 kg |

Bahador Molaei (Persian: بهادر مولایی, born March 21, 1992, in Babolsar) is an Iranian weightlifter who won a silver medal at the 2013 Wrocław world championship.

== Major results ==
| Year | Venue | Weight | Snatch (kg) | | | | Clean & Jerk (kg) | | | | Total | Rank |
| Year | Venue | Weight | 1 | 2 | 3 | Rank | 1 | 2 | 3 | Rank | Total | Rank |
World Championships
| 2013 | Wrocław, Poland | +105 kg | 195 | 200 | 203 | 2nd place, silver medalist(s) | 241 | 255 | ~~261~~ | 1st place, gold medalist(s) | 458 | 2nd place, silver medalist(s) |
| 2015 | Houston, United States | +105 kg | ~~176~~ | 176 | ~~180~~ | 17 | 230 | ~~245~~ | ~~245~~ | 11 | 406 | 15 |
Asian Games
| 2014 | Incheon, South Korea | +105 kg | 170 | 177 | ~~183~~ | 7 | -- | -- | -- | -- | -- | -- |
Asian Championships
| 2011 | Tongling, China | +105 kg | 165 | 171 | 176 | 4 | 210 | 217 | 222 | 3rd place, bronze medalist(s) | 398 | 2nd place, silver medalist(s) |
| 2013 | Astana, Kazakhstan | +105 kg | ~~185~~ | 186 | ~~193~~ | 2nd place, silver medalist(s) | ~~232~~ | ~~232~~ | ~~232~~ | -- | -- | -- |
| 2015 | Phuket, Thailand | +105 kg | 178 | ~~185~~ | ~~185~~ | 3rd place, bronze medalist(s) | 226 | 236 | ~~240~~ | 2nd place, silver medalist(s) | 414 | 2nd place, silver medalist(s) |
| 2016 | Tashkent, Uzbekistan | +105 kg | 180 | ~~185~~ | ~~189~~ | 7 | 230 | 240 | 247 | 1st place, gold medalist(s) | 427 | 3rd place, bronze medalist(s) |
Summer Universiade
| 2013 | Kazan, Russia | +105 kg | 187 | 193 | 196 | 3 | 235 | 254 | ~~264~~ | 1 | 450 | 2nd place, silver medalist(s) |
Fajr cup
| 2016 | Tehran, Iran | +105 kg | ~~176~~ | 181 | ~~190~~ | 2nd place, silver medalist(s) | 230 | ~~249~~ | ~~249~~ | 1st place, gold medalist(s) | 411 | 2nd place, silver medalist(s) |
World Juniors Championships
| 2009 | Bucharest, Romania | 105 kg | 140 | 145 | 150 | 6 | ~~182~~ | ~~182~~ | ~~182~~ | -- | -- | -- |
| 2010 | Sofia, Bulgaria | +105 kg | 158 | 161 | ~~166~~ | 6 | 200 | 205 | 208 | 3rd place, bronze medalist(s) | 369 | 5 |
| 2011 | Penang, Malaysia | +105 kg | 167 | 173 | 177 | 2nd place, silver medalist(s) | 213 | 225 | 231 | 1st place, gold medalist(s) | 408 | 1st place, gold medalist(s) |
| 2012 | Antigua, Guatemala | +105 kg | 175 | 180 | 185 | 3rd place, bronze medalist(s) | 232 | ~~241~~ | ~~241~~ | 2nd place, silver medalist(s) | 417 | 2nd place, silver medalist(s) |
World Youth Championships
| 2009 | Chiang Mai, Thailand | +94 kg | 146 | 150 | 155 | 1st place, gold medalist(s) | 180 | 190 | ~~200~~ | 1st place, gold medalist(s) | 345 | 1st place, gold medalist(s) |
Asian Youth Championships
| 2008 | Jeonju, South Korea | +94 kg | 150 | | | 2nd place, silver medalist(s) | 190 | | | 2nd place, silver medalist(s) | 340 | 2nd place, silver medalist(s) |
