= Weightlifting at the 2023 Pan American Games – Men's 73 kg =

Weightlifting – Men's 73kg at the 2023 Pan American Games
- Venue: Gimnasio Chimkowe
- Dates: 21 October
- Competitors: 17 from 16 nations

Medalists
Gold medal	Julio Mayora	Venezuela
Silver medal	Luis Javier Mosquera	Colombia
Bronze medal	Jorge Cárdenas	Mexico

The men's 73 kg competition of the weightlifting events at the 2023 Pan American Games in Santiago, Chile, was held on 21 October at the Gimnasio Chimkowe.

Each lifter performed in both the snatch and clean and jerk lifts, with the final score being the sum of the lifter's best result in each. The athlete received three attempts in each of the two lifts; the score for the lift was the heaviest weight successfully lifted. This weightlifting event was limited to competitors with a maximum of 73 kilograms of body mass.

== Results ==
The results were as follows:

Rank	Athlete	Nation	Group	Snatch (kg)				Clean & Jerk (kg)				Total
Rank	Athlete	Nation	Group	1	2	3	Result	1	2	3	Result	Total
1st place, gold medalist(s)	Julio Mayora	Venezuela	A	147	151	154	154	182	184	188	188	342
2nd place, silver medalist(s)	Luis Javier Mosquera	Colombia	A	150	~~153~~	153	153	180	~~184~~	~~186~~	180	333
3rd place, bronze medalist(s)	Jorge Cárdenas	Mexico	A	143	147	~~150~~	147	170	~~175~~	~~175~~	170	317
4	Juan Martínez	Colombia	A	131	135	138	138	173	~~180~~	~~180~~	173	311
5	Julio Cedeño	Dominican Republic	A	~~137~~	137	141	141	~~165~~	165	~~177~~	165	306
6	Travis Cooper	United States	A	~~137~~	137	~~141~~	137	165	~~175~~	~~181~~	165	302
7	Sergio Valdés	Chile	A	128	132	~~136~~	132	158	162	~~167~~	162	294
8	Jorge Hernández	Honduras	A	~~126~~	126	128	128	162	~~166~~	166	166	294
9	Henry Méndez	Independent Athletes Team	A	120	125	~~130~~	125	153	~~157~~	160	160	285
10	Jeferson Ramírez	Ecuador	A	117	122	~~124~~	122	152	156	158	158	280
11	Orlando Vázquez	Nicaragua	A	120	126	~~130~~	126	~~150~~	~~150~~	150	150	276
12	Ramón Cruz	El Salvador	A	120	~~125~~	~~126~~	120	~~153~~	153	~~158~~	153	273
13	Lucas Olivera	Uruguay	A	107	111	116	116	141	145	~~150~~	145	261
14	Kyle Bogado	Paraguay	A	105	110	~~115~~	110	140	145	150	150	260
15	Andrés Peralta	Costa Rica	A	110	115	118	118	140	~~145~~	~~145~~	140	258
16	Ronnier Martínez	Panama	A	110	113	~~117~~	113	130	140	~~150~~	140	253
17	Nicolas Vachon	Canada	A	134	~~137~~	~~137~~	–	120	~~172~~	~~172~~	~~177~~	DSQ
