= Frederic Fokejou =

Cameroonian weightlifter

Frederic Fokejou Tefot (born 3 December 1979 in Bafoussam, Cameroon) is a Cameroonian weightlifter. He competed at the 2012 Summer Olympics in the +105 kg event.
