= Jhon Serna =

Colombian weightlifter

Jhon Jairo Serna Mendoza
Personal information
- Citizenship: Colombian
- Born: 3 December 1994 (age 31)

Sport
- Country: Colombia
- Sport: Weightlifting
- Weight class: 60 kg; 61 kg
Medal record
Representing Colombia
Men's weightlifting
Pan American Games
Silver medal – second place	2019 Lima	61 kg
Pan American Championships
Bronze medal – third place	2026 Panama City	60 kg
Central American and Caribbean Games
Silver medal – second place	2018 Barranquilla	62 kg S
Bronze medal – third place	2018 Barranquilla	62 kg CJ
South American Games
Gold medal – first place	2018 Cochabamba	62 kg
Bolivarian Games
Gold medal – first place	2024 Ayacucho	61 kg
Junior World Championships
Silver medal – second place	2013 Lima	56 kg
Bronze medal – third place	2012 Antigua Guatemala	56 kg

Jhon Serna (born 3 December 1994) is a Colombian weightlifter. He represented Colombia at the 2019 World Weightlifting Championships, as well as the 2019 Pan American Championships.
