= Igor Olshanetskyi =

Israeli weightlifter (born 1986)

Personal information
- Native name: איגור אולשנצקי
- Nationality: Soviet; Ukrainian; Israeli
- Born: 16 February 1986 (age 40) Kharkiv, Ukraine, Soviet Union
- Education: Kharkiv State Academy of Physical Culture
- Occupations: construction and building security
- Height: 1.84 m (6 ft 0 in)
- Weight: 133 kg (293 lb)

Sport
- Country: Israel
- Sport: Weightlifting
- Event: +105 kg (+231 lb)

Achievements and titles
- Personal bests: Snatch: 174 kg (2015); Clean and jerk: 217 kg (2015); Total: 390 kg (2015)

Igor Olshanetskyi (also "Olshanetsky"; Hebrew: איגור אולשנצקי; born 16 February 1986) is an Israeli Olympic weightlifter, competing in the +105 kg (+231 lb) category. He represented Team Israel at the 2016 Summer Olympics in Men's +105 kg Weightlifting.

== Early life ==
Olshanetskyi is Jewish, grew up in Kharkiv, Ukraine in the Soviet Union and was raised by his grandmother from a young age after his father died. He studied Sports and Recreation Studies at the Kharkiv State Academy of Physical Culture in Ukraine.

He made aliyah and moved to Israel at the age of 24, in 2010. He lives in Ashdod, Israel, is married to Elena Olshanetskyi, and works in construction and building security.

== Weightlifting career ==
He started to lift weights at the age of 13.

Olshanetskyi is a three-time Israeli National Champion (2014–2016), and an Israeli record holder (Snatch, Clean and Jerk and Total).

He participated in the 2011 World Weightlifting Championships in the Men's +105 kg, and placed 28th (Total). In 2013, Olshanetskyi won the VII Mediterranean Cup in the Men's +105 kg, and placed 12th in the European Weightlifting Championships in the Men's +105 kg (Snatch).

In 2014, Olshanetskyi again placed 12th in the 2014 European Weightlifting Championships. In addition, he placed 10th in the Clean and Jerk and in the Total competition. In the 2014 World Weightlifting Championships in the Men's +105 kg he placed 23rd (Total).

In 2015 he placed 9th in the 2015 European Weightlifting Championships, and 21st in the 2015 World Weightlifting Championships in the Men's +105. In 2016 Olshanetskyi placed 12th in the 2016 European Weightlifting Championships in Norway, lifting a total of 366 kg, 163 kg in the snatch, and 203 kg in the clean and jerk.

Olshanetskyi represented Team Israel at the 2016 Summer Olympics in Men's +105 kg Weightlifting. He came in 17th out of 23 competitors, lifting 165 kg (snatch), 207 kg (clean and jerk), 372 kg (total).
