= Carl Henriquez =

Aruban weightlifter (born 1979)

Personal information
- Born: 8 August 1979 (age 45); Paradera, Aruba

Sport
- Sport: Weightlifting

Carl Henriquez (born 8 August 1979) is an Aruban weightlifter. He competed at the 2012 Summer Olympics in the +105 kg event.
