= Weightlifting at the 2012 Summer Olympics – Men's +105 kg =

Men's +105 kg at the Games of the XXX Olympiad
- Venue: ExCeL London
- Date: 7 August 2012
- Competitors: 19 from 17 nations

Medalists
1st place, gold medalist(s)		Behdad Salimi	Iran
2nd place, silver medalist(s)		Sajjad Anoushiravani	Iran
3rd place, bronze medalist(s)		Jeon Sang-guen	South Korea

The Men's +105 kilograms weightlifting event at the 2012 Summer Olympics in London, United Kingdom, took place at ExCeL London.

== Summary ==
Total score was the sum of the lifter's best result in each of the snatch and the clean and jerk, with three lifts allowed for each lift. In case of a tie, the lighter lifter won; if still tied, the lifter who took the fewest attempts to achieve the total score won. Lifters without a valid snatch score did not perform the clean and jerk.

Ukraine's Artem Udachyn and Azerbaijan's Velichko Cholakov were on the start list but did not compete.

Matthias Steiner was injured during the snatch portion of the competition when he attempted to pull 196 kg and was hit in the neck by the barbell. Steiner had to abandon the competition as a result of his injury.

In March 2024, Ruslan Albegov and Irakli Turmanidze were disqualified. The bronze medal was reallocated.

== Schedule ==
All times are British Summer Time (UTC+01:00)

Date	Time	Event
7 August 2012	15:30	Group B
7 August 2012	19:00	Group A

== Records ==
{{{caption}}}
World Record	Snatch	Behdad Salimi (IRI)	214 kg	Paris, France	13 November 2011
World Record	Clean & Jerk	Hossein Rezazadeh (IRI)	263 kg	Athens, Greece	25 August 2004
World Record	Total	Hossein Rezazadeh (IRI)	472 kg	Sydney, Australia	26 September 2000
Olympic Record	Snatch	Hossein Rezazadeh (IRI)	212 kg	Sydney, Australia	26 September 2000
Olympic Record	Clean & Jerk	Hossein Rezazadeh (IRI)	263 kg	Athens, Greece	25 August 2004
Olympic Record	Total	Hossein Rezazadeh (IRI)	472 kg	Sydney, Australia	26 September 2000

== Results ==
Rank	Athlete	Group	Body weight	Snatch (kg)				Clean & Jerk (kg)				Total
Rank	Athlete	Group	Body weight	1	2	3	Result	1	2	3	Result	Total
1st place, gold medalist(s)	Behdad Salimi (IRI)	A	168.19	201	205	208	208	247	~~264~~	—	247	455
2nd place, silver medalist(s)	Sajjad Anoushiravani (IRI)	A	152.46	198	~~204~~	204	204	237	245	~~251~~	245	449
3rd place, bronze medalist(s)	Jeon Sang-guen (KOR)	A	157.53	190	~~200~~	~~200~~	190	~~246~~	246	~~259~~	246	436
4	Ihor Shymechko (UKR)	A	137.38	~~197~~	197	~~200~~	197	225	232	~~237~~	232	429
5	Jiří Orság (CZE)	A	128.15	182	187	~~190~~	187	231	239	~~242~~	239	426
6	Almir Velagić (GER)	A	141.41	186	190	192	192	229	234	~~238~~	234	426
7	Chen Shih-chieh (TPE)	B	141.14	177	182	~~185~~	182	230	236	~~240~~	236	418
8	Péter Nagy (HUN)	B	155.55	184	191	~~196~~	191	216	225	~~230~~	225	416
9	Fernando Reis (BRA)	B	140.49	178	180	~~186~~	180	220	~~225~~	—	220	400
10	Kazuomi Ota (JPN)	B	146.51	180	~~184~~	185	185	~~215~~	215	~~222~~	215	400
11	Itte Detenamo (NRU)	B	151.32	165	170	175	175	205	~~215~~	215	215	390
12	Christian López (GUA)	B	139.15	172	~~177~~	~~177~~	172	~~209~~	209	215	215	387
13	Damon Kelly (AUS)	B	150.83	155	160	165	165	192	201	216	216	381
14	Frederic Fokejou (CMR)	B	132.74	150	155	160	160	190	~~200~~	202	202	362
15	Carl Henriquez (ARU)	B	150.38	115	122	~~127~~	122	~~160~~	160	~~171~~	160	282
—	Matthias Steiner (GER)	A	149.98	192	~~196~~	~~197~~	192	—	—	—	—	—
DQ	Yauheni Zharnasek (BLR)	B	147.37	188	193	196	196	219	225	230	230	~~426~~
DQ	Ruslan Albegov (RUS)	A	147.15	198	204	208	208	240	~~245~~	~~247~~	240	~~448~~
DQ	Irakli Turmanidze (GEO)	A	126.23	192	198	201	201	225	~~232~~	232	232	~~433~~
