= Ahmed Mohamed (weightlifter) =

Egyptian weightlifter (born 1988)

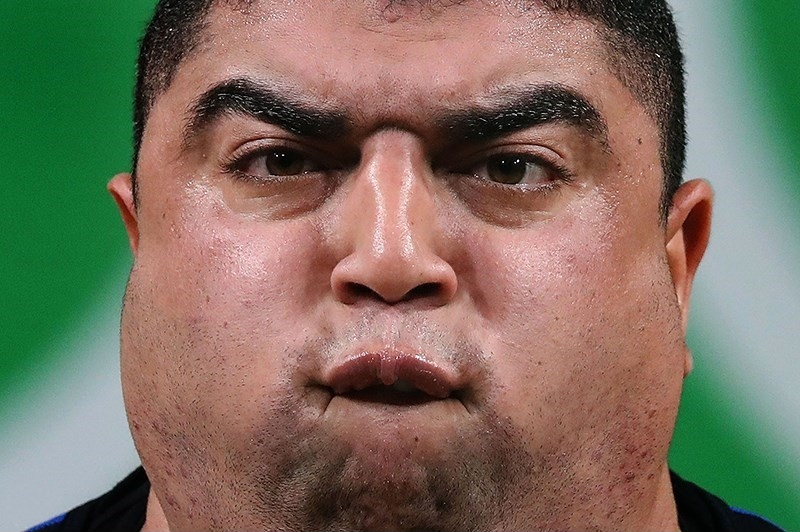
- Ahmed Mohamed at the 2016 Summer Olympics

Personal information
- Full name: Ahmed Mohamed Abdelaziz; Mohamed
- Born: 27 April 1988 (age 38)
- Height: 1.85 m (6 ft 1 in)
- Weight: 139.88 kg (308 lb)

Sport
- Country: Egypt
- Sport: Weightlifting
Medal record
World Championships
Bronze medal – third place	2015 Houston	+105 kg
- Updated on 9 April 2017

Ahmed Mohamed Abdelaziz Mohamed (Arabic: أَحْمَد مُحَمَّد عَبْد الْعَزِيز مُحَمَّد; born April 27, 1988), also known as Ahmed Mohamed, is an Egyptian male weightlifter, competing in the +105 kg category and representing Egypt at international competitions. Mohamed participated in the men's +105 kg event at the 2015 World Weightlifting Championships, and at the 2016 Summer Olympics, where he failed to register a single lift in all three attempts of the clean and jerk phase.

== Major results ==
Year	Venue	Weight	Snatch (kg)				Clean & Jerk (kg)				Total	Rank
Year	Venue	Weight	1	2	3	Rank	1	2	3	Rank	Total	Rank
World Championships
2015	Houston, United States	+105 kg	180	188	~~192~~	13	230	241	~~247~~	3rd place, bronze medalist(s)	429	8
2014	Almaty, Kazakhstan	+105 kg	175	~~181~~	181	15	225	230	~~240~~	6	411	10
