= Aleksey Lovchev =

Russian weightlifter (born 1989)

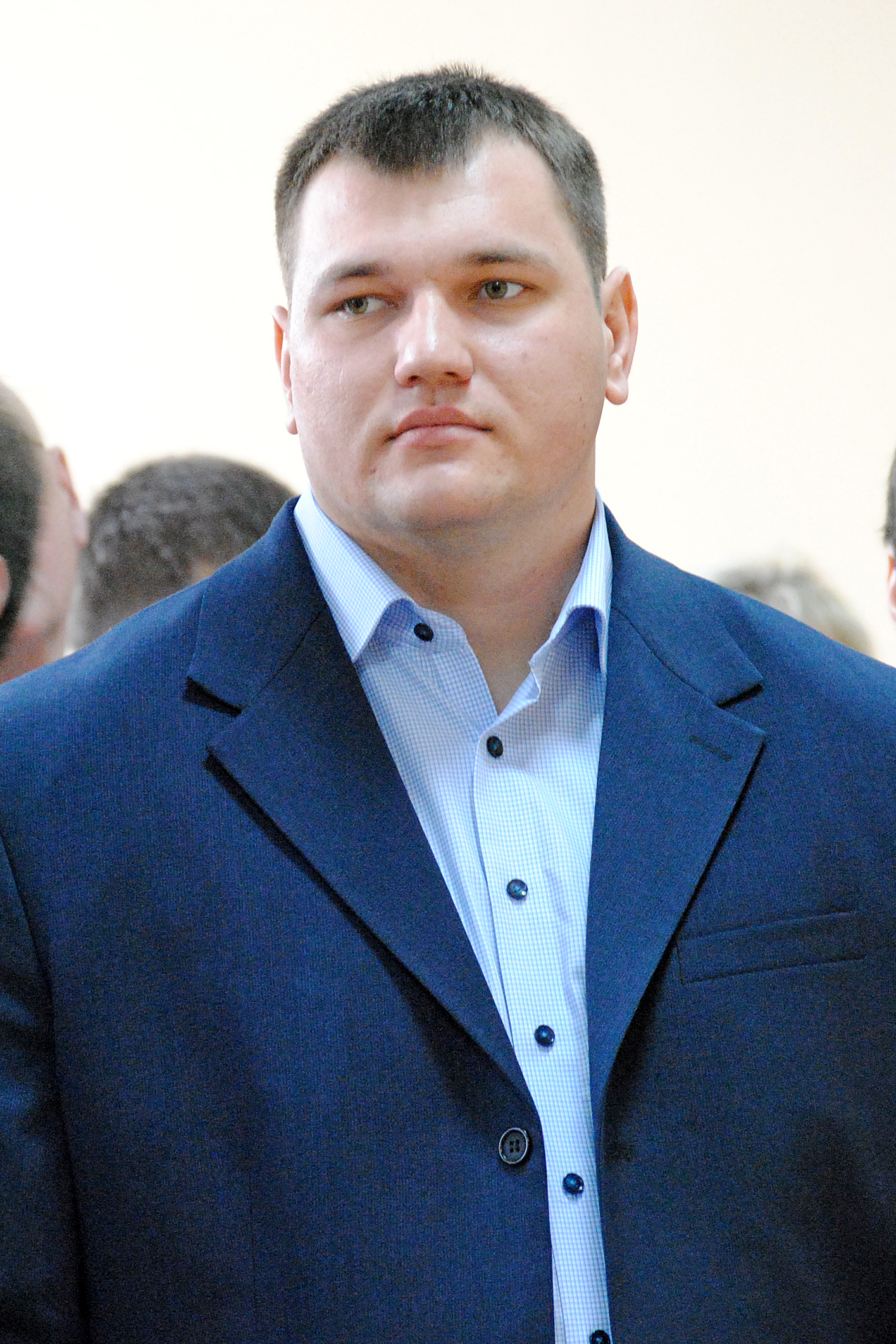

Personal information
- Full name: Aleksey Vladimirovich Lovchev
- Nationality: Russian
- Born: 13 June 1989 (age 37)
- Height: 1.88 m (6 ft 2 in)
- Weight: 140.46 kg (309.7 lb)

Sport
- Country: Russia
- Sport: Weightlifting
- Event: +105kg

Achievements and titles
- Personal bests: Snatch: 212 kg (2014); Clean and jerk: 257 kg (2014); Total: 468 kg (2014)
Medal record
World Championships
Disqualified	2015 Houston	+105kg
Bronze medal – third place	2013 Wrocław	+105kg
European Championships
Gold medal – first place	2014 Tel Aviv	+105kg
Summer Universiade
Bronze medal – third place	2011 Shenzhen	+105 kg
- Updated on 29 November 2015

Aleksey Vladimirovich Lovchev (Russian: Алексе́й Влади́мирович Ло́вчев; born 13 June 1989) is a Russian weightlifter.

== Career ==
He competed at the 2013 World Championships in the Men's +105 kg, winning the bronze medal and the European Championships 2014, winning the gold medal in the Snatch, Clean and Jerk and total.

In the 2015 World Championships he competed in the +105kg category, winning gold medals in the Snatch, Clean and Jerk, and Total, with a 211 kg Snatch and 264 kg world record Clean and Jerk for a world record 475 kg total. However, Lovchev failed a doping test and was stripped of the World Championship gold medal and world records.

In May 2016, Lovchev was banned for four years after failing A and B-samples: he tested positive for ipamorelin, a hormone growth drug. He contested this decision at Court of Arbitration for Sport, but his appeal was dismissed.

== Major results ==
Year	Venue	Weight	Snatch (kg)				Clean & Jerk (kg)				Total	Rank
Year	Venue	Weight	1	2	3	Rank	1	2	3	Rank	Total	Rank
World Championships
2013	Wrocław, Poland	+105 kg	191	196	200	3rd place, bronze medalist(s)	230	~~240~~	--	5	430	3rd place, bronze medalist(s)
2014	Almaty, Kazakhstan	+105 kg	~~205~~	~~205~~	~~205~~	--	245	250	257	1st place, gold medalist(s)	--	--
2015	Houston, United States	+105 kg	200	206	211	--	242	248	264	--	475	DQ
2021	Tashkent, Uzbekistan	+109 kg	190	196	201	5	231	~~237~~	~~238~~	7	432	5
European Championships
2014	Tel Aviv, Israel	+105 kg	192	197	205	1st place, gold medalist(s)	235	245	252	1st place, gold medalist(s)	457	1st place, gold medalist(s)
Summer Universiade
2011	Shenzhen, China	105 kg	170	~~176~~	~~176~~	3	200	205	~~213~~	3	375	3rd place, bronze medalist(s)

== See also ==
- Hossein Rezazadeh
