= Kwon Yong-gwang =

North Korean weightlifter (born 1996)

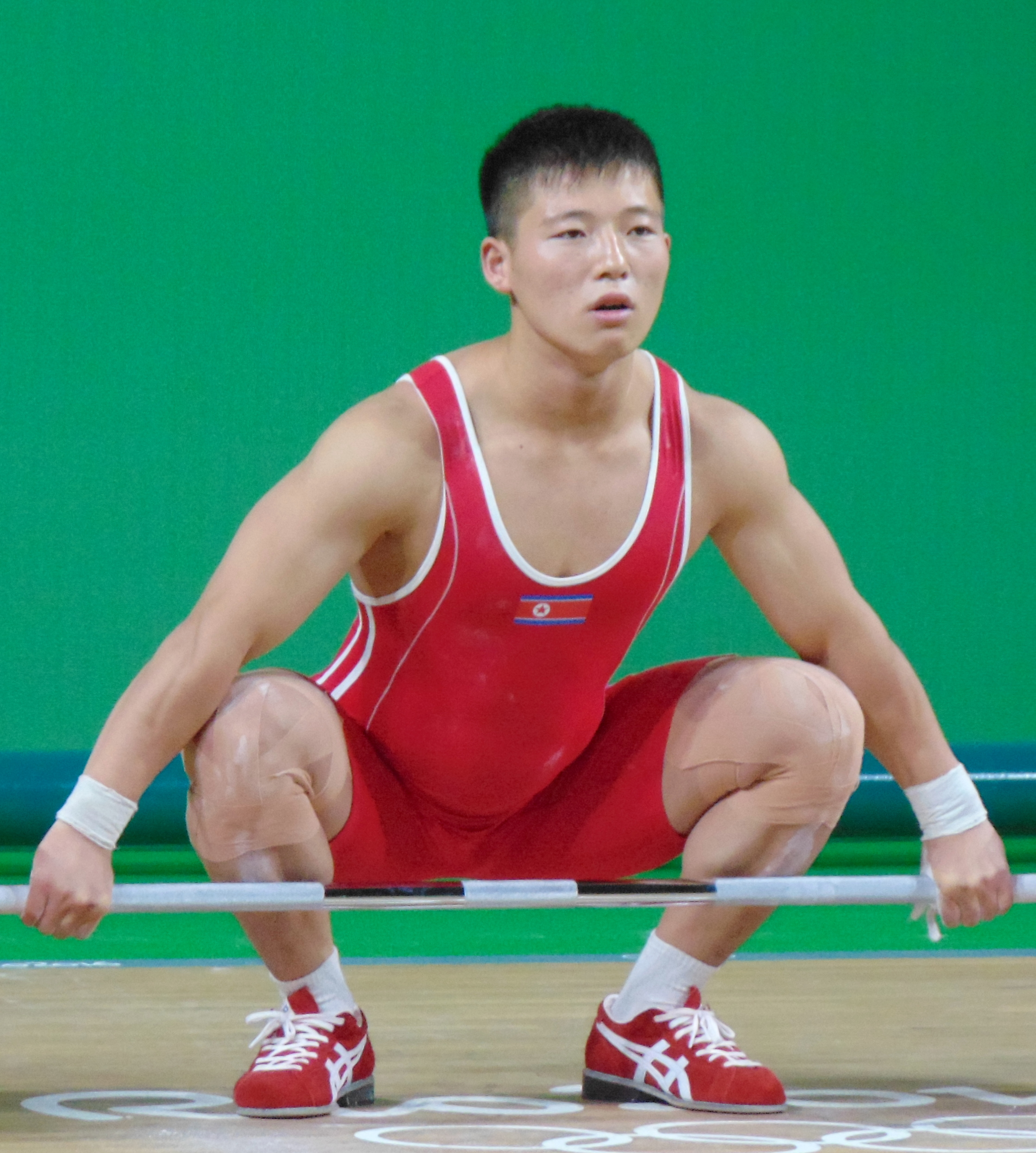
- Kwon at the 2016 Olympics

Personal information
- Born: 14 January 1996 (age 30)
- Height: 165 cm (5 ft 5 in)
- Weight: 68 kg (150 lb)

Sport
- Sport: Weightlifting
Medal record
Representing North Korea
Asian Championships
Bronze medal – third place	2016 Tashkent	-69 kg

Korean name
- Hangul: 권용광
- RR: Gwon Yonggwang
- MR: Kwŏn Yonggwang

Kwon Yong-gwang (Korean pronunciation: [kwʌ.njoŋ.ɡwaŋ] or [kwʌn] [joŋ.ɡwaŋ]; born 14 January 1996) is a North Korean weightlifter who competes in the -69 kg division. In 2016 he won a bronze medal at the Asian Championships and placed 13th at the Rio Olympics.
