= Serhiy Tahirov =

Ukrainian weightlifter

Serhiy Tahirov (Ukrainian: Сергій Тагіров born 2 January 1989 in Dnipropetrovsk, Ukrainian SSR, Soviet Union) is a Ukrainian weightlifter. He competed at the 2012 Summer Olympics in the -105 kg event, finishing in 10th with a total of 374 kg.
