= Diana Akhmetova =

Russian weightlifter (born 1994)

Personal information
- Born: 21 September 1994 (age 31)
- Height: 158 cm (5 ft 2 in)
- Weight: 58.88 kg (129.8 lb)

Sport
- Country: Russia
- Sport: Weightlifting
- Weight class: 63 kg
- Updated on 10 November 2016

Diana Akhmetova (born 21 September 1994) is a Russian weightlifter, who competed in the 63 kg category and represented Russia at international competitions.

She won the silver medal at the 2010 Summer Youth Olympics, was 2011 Youth World Champion, and lifted 237 kg to become 2012 Junior World Champion. She became the Russian Weightlifting Champion in the 63 kg class in 2013. She participated at the 2016 European Weightlifting Championships.

== Major results ==
Year	Venue	Weight	Snatch (kg)				Clean & Jerk (kg)				Total	Rank
Year	Venue	Weight	1	2	3	Rank	1	2	3	Rank	Total	Rank
Summer Youth Olympics
2010	Singapore	63 kg	89	92	94	---	110	~~114~~	~~114~~	---	204	2nd place, silver medalist(s)
