= Ruslan Albegov =

Russian weightlifter (born 1988)

Personal information
- Full name: Ruslan Vladimirovich Albegov
- Nationality: Russian
- Born: 26 January 1988 (age 38) Vladikavkaz, Russian SFSR, Soviet Union
- Education: Law at Gorsky State Agricultural University
- Height: 1.92 m (6 ft 4 in)
- Weight: 156.54 kg (345.1 lb)

Sport
- Country: Russia
- Sport: Weightlifting
- Event: +105 kg
- Club: Armed Forces (CSKA)
- Coached by: Pyotr Dzboev, Kazbek Zoloev

Achievements and titles
- Personal bests: Snatch: 210 kg (2014); Clean and jerk: 255 kg (2013); Total: 464kg (2013)
Medal record
Olympic Games
Disqualified	2012 London	+105 kg
World Championships
Gold medal – first place	2013 Wroclaw	+105 kg
Gold medal – first place	2014 Almaty	+105 kg
European Championships
Gold medal – first place	2012 Antalya	+105 kg
Gold medal – first place	2013 Tirana	+105 kg
Summer Universiade
Gold medal – first place	2013 Kazan	+105 kg

Ruslan Vladimirovich Albegov (Russian: Руслан Владимирович Албегов; born 26 January 1988 in Vladikavkaz) is a Russian weightlifter competing in the +105 kg category.

Albegov has been banned from the 2016 Olympics in Rio de Janeiro because of entire ban of Russian weightlifting team for doping. On 19 March 2024, he was disqualified following an investigation ruling by the Court of Arbitration for Sport for doping and was stripped of his bronze medal at the 2012 Olympics.

== Major results ==
Year	Venue	Weight	Snatch (kg)				Clean & Jerk (kg)				Total	Rank
Year	Venue	Weight	1	2	3	Rank	1	2	3	Rank	Total	Rank
Olympic Games
2012	London, United Kingdom	+105 kg	198	204	~~208~~	~~1~~	~~240~~	~~245~~	~~247~~	~~4~~	~~448~~	DSQ
World Championships
2013	Wrocław, Poland	+105 kg	197	205	209	1st place, gold medalist(s)	242	~~255~~	255	2nd place, silver medalist(s)	464	1st place, gold medalist(s)
2014	Almaty, Kazakhstan	+105 kg	~~203~~	205	210	1st place, gold medalist(s)	245	~~252~~	252	2nd place, silver medalist(s)	462	1st place, gold medalist(s)
2018	Ashgabat, Turkmenistan	+109 kg	191	~~197~~	197	8	235	--	--	7	432	5
European Championships
2012	Antalya, Turkey	+105 kg	182	188	191	4	225	233	238	1st place, gold medalist(s)	429	1st place, gold medalist(s)
2013	Tirana, Albania	+105 kg	~~195~~	~~195~~	195	2nd place, silver medalist(s)	230	236	247	1st place, gold medalist(s)	442	1st place, gold medalist(s)
2017	Split, Croatia	+105 kg	186	192	196	4	237	~~243~~	~~245~~	4	433	4
Summer Universiade
2013	Kazan, Russia	+105 kg	194	200	205	1	240	245	254	2	459	1st place, gold medalist(s)
IWF Grand Prix
2015	Grozny, Russia	+105 kg	195	205	~~211~~	1	235	~~265~~	~~265~~	2	440	1st place, gold medalist(s)
World Junior Championships
2008	Cali, Colombia	+105 kg	165	170	~~175~~	7	205	~~212~~	212	4	382	4
