= Mădălina Molie =

Romanian weightlifter (born 1996)

Personal information
- Full name: Madalina-Bianca Molie
- Born: 27 April 1996 (age 30)
- Weight: 58 kg (128 lb)

Sport
- Country: Romania
- Sport: Weightlifting
- Weight class: 69 kg
Medal record
European Championships
Bronze medal – third place	2019 Batumi	–71 kg
Bronze medal – third place	2017 Split	–58 kg
- Updated on 12 November 2016

Madalina-Bianca Molie (born 27 April 1996) is a Romanian weightlifter, who competed in the 69 kg category and represented Romania at international competitions. She won the silver medal in the snatch at the 2014 European Weightlifting Championships. Later in 2014 she tested positive on the forbidden substance stanozolol and was banned for two years by the International Weightlifting Federation (IWF).

== Major results ==
Year	Venue	Weight	Snatch (kg)				Clean & Jerk (kg)				Total	Rank
Year	Venue	Weight	1	2	3	Rank	1	2	3	Rank	Total	Rank
European Weightlifting Championships
2014	Tel Aviv, Israel	69 kg	97	102	105	2nd place, silver medalist(s)	~~118~~	120	~~125~~	5	225	4
