= Yauheni Zharnasek =

Belarusian weightlifter

Personal information
- Born: 9 August 1987 (age 38) Lepiel, Belarus

Yauheni Zharnasek (Belarusian: Яўген Жарнасек, born 9 August 1987 in Lepiel), also known as Yevgeny Zhernosek, is a Belarusian weightlifter. He competed at the 2012 Summer Olympics in the +105 kg event. In October 2016, the IOC disqualified him from the 2012 Olympics and annulled his result after his Olympic doping sample was retested and failed.
