= Junior World Weightlifting Championships =

IWF Junior World Championships
- Status: Active
- Genre: Sporting Event
- Date: April - May - June
- Frequency: Annual
- Country: Varying
- Inaugurated: 1975
- Organiser: IWF

The IWF Junior World Championships is organised by the International Weightlifting Federation (IWF). The first competition was held in 1975.

== Editions ==
https://intersportstats.com/competition_types/524

Year	Edition		Venue	Events
Year	M	W	Venue	Events
1975	1	–	Marseille, France	27
1976	2	–	Gdańsk, Poland	27
1977	3	–	Sofia, Bulgaria	30
1978	4	–	Athens, Greece	30
1979	5	–	Debrecen, Hungary	30
1980	6	–	Montreal, Canada	30
1981	7	–	Lignano Sabbiadoro, Italy	30
1982	8	–	São Paulo, Brazil	30
1983	9	–	Cairo, Egypt	30
1984	10	–	Lignano Sabbiadoro, Italy	30
1985	11	–	Edinburgh, Scotland	30
1986	12	–	Donaueschingen, Germany	30
1987	13	–	(Socialist Federal Republic of Yugoslavia) Belgrade, Yugoslavia	30
1988	14	–	Athens, Greece	30
1989	15	–	Lauderdale, United States	30
1990	16	–	(Socialist Federal Republic of Yugoslavia) Sarajevo, Yugoslavia	30
1991	17	–	Wolmirstedt, Germany	30
1992	18	–	Varna, Bulgaria	30
1993	19	–	Cheb, Czech Republic	30
1994	20	–	Jakarta, Indonesia	30
1995	21	1	Warsaw, Poland	57
1996	22	2	Warsaw, Poland	57
1997	23	3	Cape Town, South Africa	57
1998	24	4	Sofia, Bulgaria	45
1999	25	5	Savannah, United States	45
2000	26	6	Prague, Czech Republic	45
2001	27	7	Thessaloniki, Greece	45
2002	28	8	Havířov, Czech Republic	45
2003	29	9	Hermosillo, Mexico	45
2004	30	10	Minsk, Belarus	45
2005	31	11	Busan, South Korea	45
2006	32	12	Hangzhou, China	45
2007	33	13	Prague, Czech Republic	45
2008	34	14	Cali, Colombia	45
2009	35	15	Bucharest, Romania	45
2010	36	16	Sofia, Bulgaria	45
2011	37	17	Penang, Malaysia	45
2012	38	18	Antigua Guatemala, Guatemala	45
2013	39	19	Lima, Peru	45
2014	40	20	Kazan, Russia	45
2015	41	21	Wrocław, Poland	45
2016	42	22	(Georgia (country)) Tbilisi, Georgia	45
2017	43	23	Tokyo, Japan	48
2018	44	24	Tashkent, Uzbekistan	48
2019	45	25	Suva, Fiji	60
2021	46	26	Tashkent, Uzbekistan	60
2022	47	27	Heraklion, Greece	60
2023	48	28	Guadalajara, Mexico	60
2024	49	29	León, Spain	60
2025	50	30	Lima, Peru	60
2026	51	31	Ismailia, Egypt	48
2027	52	32	Tirana, Albania	
