= 2010 World Weightlifting Championships – Women's 48 kg =

The women's competition in the flyweight (– 48 kg) division was held on 17 September 2010.

== Schedule ==
Date	Time	Event
17 September 2010	10:00	Group C
17 September 2010	17:00	Group B
17 September 2010	20:00	Group A

== Medalists ==
Event	Gold		Silver		Bronze	
Snatch	Sibel Özkan (TUR)	90 kg	Tian Yuan (CHN)	88 kg	Pramsiri Bunphithak (THA)	83 kg
Clean & Jerk	Tian Yuan (CHN)	116 kg	Sibel Özkan (TUR)	115 kg	Chen Wei-ling (TPE)	105 kg
Total	Sibel Özkan (TUR)	205 kg	Tian Yuan (CHN)	204 kg	Pramsiri Bunphithak (THA)	186 kg

== Records ==
Prior to this competition, the existing world records were as follows.

World Record	Snatch	Yang Lian (CHN)	98 kg	Santo Domingo, Dominican	1 October 2006
World Record	Clean & Jerk	Chen Xiexia (CHN)	120 kg	Tai'an, China	21 April 2007
World Record	Total	Yang Lian (CHN)	217 kg	Santo Domingo, Dominican	1 October 2006

== Results ==
Rank	Athlete	Group	Body weight	Snatch (kg)				Clean & Jerk (kg)				Total
Rank	Athlete	Group	Body weight	1	2	3	Rank	1	2	3	Rank	Total
1st place, gold medalist(s)	Sibel Özkan (TUR)	A	47.72	87	90	~~93~~	1st place, gold medalist(s)	110	115	~~119~~	2nd place, silver medalist(s)	205
2nd place, silver medalist(s)	Tian Yuan (CHN)	A	47.83	82	86	88	2nd place, silver medalist(s)	106	113	116	1st place, gold medalist(s)	204
3rd place, bronze medalist(s)	Pramsiri Bunphithak (THA)	A	47.71	81	83	~~86~~	3rd place, bronze medalist(s)	~~103~~	103	~~105~~	4	186
4	Chen Wei-ling (TPE)	A	47.08	77	80	~~82~~	4	98	102	105	3rd place, bronze medalist(s)	185
5	Im Jyoung-hwa (KOR)	A	47.94	80	~~84~~	~~84~~	6	100	~~104~~	~~104~~	7	180
6	Marzena Karpińska (POL)	A	47.87	80	~~83~~	~~83~~	5	~~93~~	93	96	8	176
7	Ryang Chun-hwa (PRK)	A	47.40	~~75~~	75	~~80~~	10	~~100~~	~~100~~	100	6	175
8	Panida Khamsri (THA)	A	47.20	~~74~~	74	~~78~~	13	100	~~104~~	~~104~~	5	174
9	Carolina Valencia (MEX)	B	47.87	76	~~78~~	~~79~~	9	95	~~98~~	~~98~~	10	171
10	Shqiponja Brahja (ALB)	B	47.94	73	77	80	7	85	90	~~93~~	15	170
11	Genny Pagliaro (ITA)	B	47.68	~~75~~	75	~~78~~	11	90	93	~~95~~	11	168
12	Margarita Yelisseyeva (KAZ)	B	47.81	72	76	78	8	90	~~95~~	~~95~~	14	168
13	Honami Mizuochi (JPN)	B	47.93	~~75~~	75	~~78~~	12	92	~~95~~	~~95~~	12	167
14	Estefanía Juan (ESP)	B	47.58	~~70~~	70	~~75~~	15	90	93	95	9	165
15	Portia Vries (RSA)	C	47.57	63	66	68	16	90	~~93~~	~~93~~	13	158
16	Kelly Rexroad (USA)	B	47.89	~~69~~	69	71	14	84	~~88~~	~~88~~	20	155
17	Carolanni Reyes (DOM)	B	47.86	65	~~68~~	~~68~~	21	83	~~87~~	87	17	152
18	Giovanna D'Alessandro (ITA)	C	45.18	60	65	67	17	80	84	~~86~~	19	151
19	María Vásquez (ECU)	C	48.00	62	65	~~67~~	22	81	83	85	18	150
20	Anaïs Michel (FRA)	B	47.74	66	~~69~~	~~69~~	19	83	~~87~~	~~87~~	23	149
21	Silviya Angelova (AZE)	C	47.84	60	65	67	18	75	~~82~~	82	24	149
22	Mahliyo Togoeva (UZB)	C	47.92	60	64	~~67~~	23	82	84	~~86~~	21	148
23	Elena Andrieș (ROU)	C	47.62	~~63~~	63	~~66~~	24	~~83~~	~~83~~	83	22	146
24	Anna Athanasiadou (GRE)	C	47.93	~~62~~	62	66	20	75	80	~~82~~	27	146
25	Santoshi Matsa (IND)	C	47.97	58	~~62~~	62	25	77	79	81	25	143
26	Marina Sisoeva (UZB)	C	46.29	60	~~63~~	~~64~~	26	76	80	~~83~~	26	140
27	Lilla Berki (HUN)	C	46.82	42	~~45~~	45	27	53	56	~~60~~	28	101
—	Masitoh (INA)	B	47.13	~~70~~	~~70~~	~~70~~	—	88	~~91~~	~~91~~	16	—
DQ	Nurcan Taylan (TUR)	A	47.88	90	93	~~99~~	—	112	116	121	—	—

== New records ==
Clean & Jerk	~~121 kg~~	~~Nurcan Taylan (TUR)~~	~~WR~~
