= 2007 World Weightlifting Championships – Women's 48 kg =

The women's competition in 48 kg division was staged on September 17, 2007.

== Schedule ==
Date	Time	Event
17 September 2007	09:30	Group C
17 September 2007	14:30	Group B
17 September 2007	17:00	Group A

== Medalists ==
Event	Gold		Silver		Bronze	
Snatch	Chen Xiexia (CHN)	96 kg	Pramsiri Bunphithak (THA)	86 kg	Nurcan Taylan (TUR)	85 kg
Clean & Jerk	Chen Xiexia (CHN)	118 kg	Pensiri Laosirikul (THA)	112 kg	Pramsiri Bunphithak (THA)	110 kg
Total	Chen Xiexia (CHN)	214 kg	Pramsiri Bunphithak (THA)	196 kg	Pensiri Laosirikul (THA)	195 kg

== Records ==
Prior to this competition, the existing world records were as follows.

World Record	Snatch	Yang Lian (CHN)	98 kg	Santo Domingo, Dominican	1 October 2006
World Record	Clean & Jerk	Chen Xiexia (CHN)	120 kg	Tai'an, China	21 April 2007
World Record	Total	Yang Lian (CHN)	217 kg	Santo Domingo, Dominican	1 October 2006

== Results ==
Rank	Athlete	Group	Body weight	Snatch (kg)				Clean & Jerk (kg)				Total
Rank	Athlete	Group	Body weight	1	2	3	Rank	1	2	3	Rank	Total
1st place, gold medalist(s)	Chen Xiexia (CHN)	A	47.78	90	94	96	1st place, gold medalist(s)	113	118	~~122~~	1st place, gold medalist(s)	214
2nd place, silver medalist(s)	Pramsiri Bunphithak (THA)	A	47.55	83	86	~~90~~	2nd place, silver medalist(s)	107	110	~~111~~	3rd place, bronze medalist(s)	196
3rd place, bronze medalist(s)	Pensiri Laosirikul (THA)	A	47.52	~~83~~	83	~~86~~	7	108	110	112	2nd place, silver medalist(s)	195
4	Sibel Özkan (TUR)	A	47.14	~~84~~	84	~~86~~	4	104	108	~~110~~	4	192
5	Hiromi Miyake (JPN)	A	47.66	78	~~80~~	80	10	104	106	~~109~~	5	186
6	Citra Febrianti (INA)	A	47.76	78	82	~~85~~	9	97	~~102~~	102	6	184
7	Estefanía Juan (ESP)	A	47.46	80	83	~~85~~	6	100	~~103~~	~~103~~	7	183
8	Genny Pagliaro (ITA)	A	47.61	79	82	84	5	96	99	~~100~~	9	183
9	Ngô Thị Nga (VIE)	B	47.87	80	83	~~85~~	8	90	95	98	11	181
10	Pak Un-hui (PRK)	A	47.94	~~80~~	~~80~~	80	11	100	~~105~~	~~105~~	8	180
11	Chen Wei-ling (TPE)	B	46.76	~~76~~	76	~~80~~	14	~~96~~	96	~~105~~	12	172
12	Mélanie Noël (FRA)	B	47.52	74	~~77~~	77	12	94	~~98~~	~~98~~	14	171
13	Carolina Valencia (MEX)	B	47.95	73	~~77~~	77	13	~~92~~	92	~~95~~	17	169
14	Ngangbam Soniya Chanu (IND)	C	47.85	70	~~75~~	~~75~~	21	90	94	98	10	168
15	Marzena Karpińska (POL)	B	47.69	72	~~74~~	74	16	88	90	92	16	166
16	Shoko Sumida (JPN)	B	47.63	74	~~77~~	~~77~~	15	~~90~~	90	~~91~~	18	164
17	Maryse Turcotte (CAN)	C	47.72	~~65~~	65	68	23	92	~~96~~	96	13	164
18	Betsi Rivas (VEN)	B	47.84	70	~~72~~	~~72~~	20	~~85~~	85	90	19	160
19	Donka Mincheva (BUL)	B	47.94	67	~~70~~	70	22	86	~~89~~	89	20	159
20	Tin Tin Hla (MYA)	B	46.71	65	~~71~~	~~72~~	28	85	92	93	15	158
21	Olga Navotna (UKR)	B	47.66	68	71	~~73~~	17	85	~~89~~	~~89~~	24	156
22	Wen Shih-ping (TPE)	C	47.97	60	64	67	25	85	~~89~~	89	21	156
23	Gema Peris (ESP)	B	47.65	70	~~73~~	~~73~~	19	85	~~88~~	~~88~~	23	155
24	Stacy Suyama (USA)	C	47.94	69	~~71~~	71	18	80	83	~~85~~	27	154
25	Portia Vries (RSA)	C	47.90	65	~~70~~	~~70~~	29	85	~~88~~	88	22	153
26	Onyeka Azike (NGR)	C	47.98	67	~~70~~	~~70~~	26	~~85~~	85	~~90~~	25	152
27	Guillermina Candelario (DOM)	C	45.91	~~65~~	65	~~66~~	27	83	~~88~~	~~88~~	26	148
28	Suzanne Hiram (NRU)	C	47.59	62	67	~~70~~	24	80	~~83~~	~~83~~	28	147
29	Tea Grönman (FIN)	C	47.04	55	~~56~~	58	30	70	73	~~76~~	29	131
—	Nurcan Taylan (TUR)	A	47.52	~~84~~	~~84~~	85	3rd place, bronze medalist(s)	~~100~~	~~100~~	~~100~~	—	—
