= 2011 World Weightlifting Championships – Women's 48 kg =

The women's competition in the flyweight (– 48 kg) division was held on 5 November 2011.

== Schedule ==
Date	Time	Event
5 November 2011	10:00	Group C
5 November 2011	12:00	Group B
5 November 2011	17:00	Group A

== Medalists ==
Event	Gold		Silver		Bronze	
Snatch	Tian Yuan (CHN)	90 kg	Genny Pagliaro (ITA)	83 kg	Marzena Karpińska (POL)	82 kg
Clean & Jerk	Tian Yuan (CHN)	117 kg	Panida Khamsri (THA)	107 kg	Nurdan Karagöz (TUR)	103 kg
Total	Tian Yuan (CHN)	207 kg	Panida Khamsri (THA)	187 kg	Nurdan Karagöz (TUR)	183 kg

== Records ==
Prior to this competition, the existing world records were as follows.

World Record	Snatch	Yang Lian (CHN)	98 kg	Santo Domingo, Dominican	1 October 2006
World Record	Clean & Jerk	~~Nurcan Taylan (TUR)~~; Chen Xiexia (CHN)	~~121 kg~~ 120 kg	~~Antalya, Turkey~~; Tai'an, China	~~17 September 2010~~; 21 April 2007
World Record	Total	Yang Lian (CHN)	217 kg	Santo Domingo, Dominican	1 October 2006

- Nurcan Taylan's world record was rescinded in 2021.

== Results ==
Rank	Athlete	Group	Body weight	Snatch (kg)				Clean & Jerk (kg)				Total
Rank	Athlete	Group	Body weight	1	2	3	Rank	1	2	3	Rank	Total
1st place, gold medalist(s)	Tian Yuan (CHN)	A	47.76	85	87	90	1st place, gold medalist(s)	111	115	117	1st place, gold medalist(s)	207
2nd place, silver medalist(s)	Panida Khamsri (THA)	A	47.59	~~80~~	80	~~85~~	6	103	104	107	2nd place, silver medalist(s)	187
3rd place, bronze medalist(s)	Nurdan Karagöz (TUR)	A	46.91	76	80	~~83~~	4	101	~~103~~	103	3rd place, bronze medalist(s)	183
4	Wipada Sirimongkhon (THA)	A	47.48	~~80~~	80	~~84~~	5	~~101~~	101	103	4	183
5	Marzena Karpińska (POL)	A	47.69	82	~~84~~	~~84~~	3rd place, bronze medalist(s)	98	101	~~103~~	5	183
6	Ngangbam Soniya Chanu (IND)	A	47.52	72	74	75	7	93	96	~~100~~	7	171
7	Silviya Angelova (AZE)	A	47.96	75	~~78~~	~~78~~	8	95	~~97~~	~~97~~	9	170
8	Betsi Rivas (VEN)	B	47.84	~~68~~	68	70	14	90	95	97	6	167
9	Lely Burgos (PUR)	C	47.40	~~70~~	70	~~72~~	13	~~92~~	92	~~95~~	8	165
10	Estefanía Juan (ESP)	B	47.60	67	70	73	9	87	~~90~~	90	10	163
11	Khumukcham Sanjita Chanu (IND)	B	47.61	68	~~71~~	71	11	90	~~93~~	~~93~~	11	161
12	Masitoh (INA)	B	47.16	67	~~71~~	71	10	87	~~92~~	~~92~~	13	158
13	Mélanie Bardis (FRA)	B	47.90	68	71	~~73~~	12	87	~~90~~	~~90~~	14	158
14	Anaïs Michel (FRA)	B	47.63	65	~~68~~	~~68~~	19	83	86	88	12	153
15	Carolanni Reyes (DOM)	B	47.98	68	~~70~~	~~71~~	17	80	85	~~90~~	17	153
16	Georgina Silvestre (DOM)	B	46.24	~~66~~	67	69	15	79	82	~~85~~	19	151
17	Giovanna D'Alessandro (ITA)	C	44.33	62	~~65~~	66	18	80	84	~~86~~	18	150
18	Génesis Murcia (ESA)	C	46.96	65	68	~~70~~	16	80	~~84~~	~~84~~	21	148
19	Aline Campeiro (BRA)	C	47.96	~~62~~	62	~~66~~	22	78	83	86	15	148
20	Jo Calvino (GBR)	C	47.95	62	~~64~~	~~64~~	21	83	85	~~87~~	16	147
21	Vivian Lee (AUS)	C	47.20	~~62~~	62	~~66~~	20	82	~~87~~	~~87~~	20	144
22	Kulsoom Abdullah (PAK)	C	47.80	~~37~~	37	40	24	48	52	~~55~~	23	92
—	Genny Pagliaro (ITA)	A	47.94	80	83	~~85~~	2nd place, silver medalist(s)	~~100~~	~~100~~	~~100~~	—	—
—	Hannah Powell (GBR)	C	43.70	57	~~60~~	60	23	~~77~~	~~77~~	~~77~~	—	—
—	Fiorela Ramírez (PER)	C	47.46	~~58~~	~~58~~	~~58~~	—	70	75	~~80~~	22	—
—	Cristina Iovu (MDA)	A	47.89	~~83~~	—	—	—	—	—	—	—	—
DQ	Shqiponja Brahja (ALB)	B	48.00	75	~~76~~	~~80~~	—	90	~~96~~	96	—	—
