= 2013 World Weightlifting Championships – Women's 48 kg =

The women's competition in the –48 kg division was held on 20 October 2013 in Centennial Hall, Wrocław, Poland.

== Schedule ==
| Date | Time | Event |
|---|---|---|
| 20 October 2013 | 11:00 | Group B |
| 20 October 2013 | 13:25 | Group A |

== Medalists ==
| Event | Gold | | Silver | | Bronze | |
|---|---|---|---|---|---|---|
| Snatch | Tan Yayun (CHN) | 84 kg | Ryang Chun-hwa (PRK) | 81 kg | Marzena Karpińska (POL) | 78 kg |
| Clean & Jerk | Tan Yayun (CHN) | 115 kg | Ryang Chun-hwa (PRK) | 105 kg | Đỗ Thị Thu Hoài (VIE) | 98 kg |
| Total | Tan Yayun (CHN) | 199 kg | Ryang Chun-hwa (PRK) | 186 kg | Đỗ Thị Thu Hoài (VIE) | 176 kg |

== Records ==
Prior to this competition, the existing world records were as follows.

| World Record | Snatch | Yang Lian (CHN) | 98 kg | Santo Domingo, Dominican | 1 October 2006 |
| World Record | Clean & Jerk | ~~Nurcan Taylan (TUR)~~; Chen Xiexia (CHN) | ~~121 kg~~ 120 kg | ~~Antalya, Turkey~~; Tai'an, China | ~~17 September 2010~~; 21 April 2007 |
| World Record | Total | Yang Lian (CHN) | 217 kg | Santo Domingo, Dominican | 1 October 2006 |

- Nurcan Taylan's world record was rescinded in 2021.

== Results ==
| Rank | Athlete | Group | Body weight | Snatch (kg) | | | | Clean & Jerk (kg) | | | | Total |
| Rank | Athlete | Group | Body weight | 1 | 2 | 3 | Rank | 1 | 2 | 3 | Rank | Total |
|---|---|---|---|---|---|---|---|---|---|---|---|---|
| 1st place, gold medalist(s) | Tan Yayun (CHN) | A | 47.67 | ~~84~~ | ~~84~~ | 84 | 1st place, gold medalist(s) | 106 | 110 | 115 | 1st place, gold medalist(s) | 199 |
| 2nd place, silver medalist(s) | Ryang Chun-hwa (PRK) | A | 47.34 | 78 | 81 | ~~83~~ | 2nd place, silver medalist(s) | ~~105~~ | ~~105~~ | 105 | 2nd place, silver medalist(s) | 186 |
| 3rd place, bronze medalist(s) | Đỗ Thị Thu Hoài (VIE) | A | 47.89 | 78 | ~~80~~ | ~~80~~ | 4 | ~~98~~ | 98 | ~~100~~ | 3rd place, bronze medalist(s) | 176 |
| 4 | Marzena Karpińska (POL) | A | 47.71 | 78 | ~~81~~ | ~~81~~ | 3rd place, bronze medalist(s) | 97 | ~~103~~ | ~~104~~ | 4 | 175 |
| 5 | Iana Diachenko (UKR) | A | 47.55 | ~~77~~ | 77 | ~~81~~ | 5 | 89 | ~~89~~ | 92 | 6 | 169 |
| 6 | Honami Mizuochi (JPN) | B | 47.83 | 75 | 77 | ~~79~~ | 6 | 90 | 92 | ~~93~~ | 7 | 169 |
| 7 | Katherine Mercado (COL) | A | 47.62 | 73 | 76 | ~~78~~ | 7 | ~~90~~ | ~~90~~ | 90 | 12 | 166 |
| 8 | Anaïs Michel (FRA) | A | 47.74 | 70 | ~~73~~ | 73 | 8 | ~~89~~ | ~~89~~ | 89 | 13 | 162 |
| 9 | Mahliyo Togoeva (UZB) | B | 47.54 | 65 | 68 | 70 | 11 | 87 | 89 | 91 | 9 | 161 |
| 10 | Lely Burgos (PUR) | B | 47.61 | ~~70~~ | 70 | ~~72~~ | 12 | 88 | ~~91~~ | 91 | 10 | 161 |
| 11 | Morghan King (USA) | B | 47.48 | 68 | 70 | ~~72~~ | 10 | 88 | ~~90~~ | 90 | 11 | 160 |
| 12 | Galina Momotova (KAZ) | A | 47.46 | ~~70~~ | ~~70~~ | 70 | 9 | ~~88~~ | 88 | ~~91~~ | 14 | 158 |
| 13 | Jessica Ruel (CAN) | B | 47.94 | 70 | ~~73~~ | ~~73~~ | 13 | 83 | 85 | ~~87~~ | 16 | 155 |
| 14 | Estefanía Juan (ESP) | B | 47.56 | 68 | ~~71~~ | ~~71~~ | 14 | 85 | ~~88~~ | ~~88~~ | 15 | 153 |
| — | Ana Segura (COL) | A | 47.52 | ~~72~~ | ~~72~~ | ~~72~~ | — | 90 | 93 | ~~97~~ | 5 | — |
| — | Misaki Oshiro (JPN) | B | 47.42 | ~~77~~ | ~~77~~ | ~~77~~ | — | 88 | 91 | ~~93~~ | 8 | — |
| DQ | Carolina Valencia (MEX) | A | 47.63 | 75 | ~~78~~ | 78 | — | 98 | 103 | ~~106~~ | — | — |
