= List of Polish records in Olympic weightlifting =

The following are the national records in Olympic weightlifting in Poland. Records are maintained in each weight class for the snatch lift, clean and jerk lift, and the total for both lifts by the Polski Związek Podnoszenia Ciężarów (PZPC).

== Current records ==
=== Men ===
Event	Record	Athlete	Date	Meet	Place	Ref
60 kg
Snatch	123 kg	Standard				
Clean & Jerk	147 kg	Standard				
Total	270 kg	Standard				
65 kg
Snatch	131 kg	Standard				
Clean & Jerk	157 kg	Standard				
Total	288 kg	Standard				
70 kg
Snatch	139 kg	Standard				
Clean & Jerk	168 kg	Piotr Kudłaszyk	13 June 2026	Polish Championships	Radomsko, Poland	
Total	306 kg	Standard				
75 kg
Snatch	146 kg	Konrad Łazuga	13 June 2026	Polish Championships	Radomsko, Poland	
Snatch	149 kg	Konrad Łazuga	31 October 2026	World Championships	Ningbo, China	
Clean & Jerk	180 kg	Konrad Łazuga	16 October 2026	European U23 Championships	Durrës, Albania	
Total	326 kg	Konrad Łazuga	16 October 2026	European U23 Championships	Durrës, Albania	
85 kg
Snatch	156 kg	Standard				
Clean & Jerk	186 kg	Standard				
Total	342 kg	Standard				
95 kg
Snatch	165 kg	Daniel Kołecki	4 November 2026	World Championships	Ningbo, China	
Clean & Jerk	199 kg	Daniel Kołecki	14 June 2026	Polish Championships	Radomsko, Poland	
Total	362 kg	Standard				
110 kg
Snatch	176 kg	Marcin Ziółkowski	18 October 2026	European Junior Championships	Durrës, Albania	
Clean & Jerk	205 kg	Standard				
Total	377 kg	Marcin Ziółkowski	18 October 2026	European Junior Championships	Durrës, Albania	
+110 kg
Snatch	178 kg	Standard				
Clean & Jerk	213 kg	Standard				
Total	391 kg	Standard				

=== Women ===
Event	Record	Athlete	Date	Meet	Place	Ref
49 kg
Snatch	73 kg	Standard				
Clean & Jerk	96 kg	Standard				
Total	169 kg	Standard				
53 kg
Snatch	85 kg	Małgorzata Myjak	30 May 2026	Polish U23 Championships	Ciechanów, Poland	
Clean & Jerk	103 kg	Oliwia Drzazga	12 June 2026	Polish Championships	Radomsko, Poland	
Total	186 kg	Małgorzata Myjak	30 May 2026	Polish U23 Championships	Ciechanów, Poland	
57 kg
Snatch	85 kg	Standard				
Clean & Jerk	105 kg	Standard				
Total	190 kg	Standard				
61 kg
Snatch	93 kg	Standard				
Clean & Jerk	113 kg	Wiktoria Wołk	1 November 2026	World Championships	Ningbo, China	
Total	204 kg	Standard				
69 kg
Snatch	104 kg	Martyna Dołęga	16 October 2026	European U23 Championships	Durrës, Albania	
Clean & Jerk	128 kg	Martyna Dołęga	16 October 2026	European U23 Championships	Durrës, Albania	
Total	232 kg	Martyna Dołęga	16 October 2026	European U23 Championships	Durrës, Albania	
77 kg
Snatch	103 kg	Standard				
Clean & Jerk	123 kg	Standard				
Total	226 kg	Standard				
86 kg
Snatch	106 kg	Standard				
Clean & Jerk	130 kg	Weronika Zielińska-Stubińska	23 May 2026			
Total	235 kg	Standard				
+86 kg
Snatch	108 kg	Standard				
Clean & Jerk	131 kg	Standard				
Total	239 kg	Standard				

== Historical records ==
=== Men (2018–2025) ===
Event	Record	Athlete	Date	Meet	Place	Ref
55 kg
Snatch	94 kg	Tomasz Żełem	17 June 2023	Polish Championships	Gdańsk, Poland	
Clean & Jerk	114 kg	Maciej Gumuliński	5 June 2021	Polish Championships	Gdańsk, Poland	
Total	202 kg	Tomasz Żełem	17 June 2023	Polish Championships	Gdańsk, Poland	
61 kg
Snatch	118 kg	Kacper Urban	21 September 2019		Polkowice, Poland	
Clean & Jerk	141 kg	Kacper Urban	21 September 2019		Polkowice, Poland	
Total	259 kg	Kacper Urban	21 September 2019		Polkowice, Poland	
67 kg
Snatch	131 kg	Kacper Urban	12 June 2022	Polish U23 Championships	Bydgoszcz, Poland	
Clean & Jerk	155 kg	Marek Komorowski	17 April 2023	European Championships	Yerevan, Armenia	
Total	278 kg	Kacper Urban	30 May 2022	European Championships	Tirana, Albania	
73 kg
Snatch	143 kg	Piotr Kudłaszyk	31 May 2022	European Championships	Tirana, Albania	
Clean & Jerk	183 kg	Piotr Kudłaszyk	18 April 2023	European Championships	Yerevan, Armenia	
Total	325 kg	Piotr Kudłaszyk	18 April 2023	European Championships	Yerevan, Armenia	
81 kg
Snatch	152 kg	Standard				
Clean & Jerk	188 kg	Krzysztof Zwarycz	23 June 2019	Polish Championships	Ciechanów, Poland	
Total	338 kg	Standard				
89 kg
Snatch	161 kg	Bartłomiej Adamus	4 September 2020		Biała Podlaska, Poland	
Clean & Jerk	198 kg	Krzysztof Zwarycz	3 October 2020		Opole, Poland	
Total	357 kg	Bartłomiej Adamus	29 November 2020	Polish Championships	Biłgoraj, Poland	
96 kg
Snatch	166 kg	Standard				
Clean & Jerk	206 kg	Standard				
Total	371 kg	Standard				
102 kg
Snatch	169 kg	Standard				
Clean & Jerk	210 kg	Arsen Kasabijew	14 September 2023	World Championships	Riyadh, Saudi Arabia	
Total	379 kg	Arsen Kasabijew	14 September 2023	World Championships	Riyadh, Saudi Arabia	
109 kg
Snatch	179 kg	Standard				
Clean & Jerk	228 kg	Arkadiusz Michalski	9 November 2018	World Championships	Ashgabat, Turkmenistan	
Total	403 kg	Arkadiusz Michalski	9 November 2018	World Championships	Ashgabat, Turkmenistan	
+109 kg
Snatch	175 kg	Szymon Ziółkowski	21 April 2025	European Championships	Chișinău, Moldova	
Clean & Jerk	225 kg	Arkadiusz Michalski	3 October 2020		Opole, Poland	
Total	395 kg	Standard				

=== Men (1998–2018) ===
Event	Record	Athlete	Date	Meet	Place	Ref
-56 kg
Snatch	114 kg	Dominik Kozłowski	2 April 2017	European Championships	Split, Croatia	
Clean & Jerk	145 kg	Marek Gorzelniak	28 April 1998	European Championships	Riesa, Germany	
Total	255 kg	Marek Gorzelniak	28 April 1998	European Championships	Riesa, Germany	
-62 kg
Snatch	130 kg	Marcin Gruszka	24 May 2002	National Championships	Bydgoszcz, Poland	
Clean & Jerk	155 kg	Standard				
Total	280 kg	Marcin Gruszka	24 May 2002	National Championships	Bydgoszcz, Poland	
-69 kg
Snatch	152 kg	Arkadiusz Smółka	16 November 2003	World Championships	Vancouver, Canada	
Clean & Jerk	179 kg	Wojciech Natusiewicz	26 June 2004	National Championships	Ciechanów, Poland	
Total	325 kg	Arkadiusz Smółka	16 November 2003	World Championships	Vancouver, Canada	
-77 kg
Snatch	165 kg	Standard				
Clean & Jerk	202 kg	Waldemar Kosiński	2 October 1998	National Championships	Ciechanów, Poland	
Total	365 kg	Waldemar Kosiński	2 October 1998	National Championships	Ciechanów, Poland	
-85 kg
Snatch	175 kg	Andrzej Cofalik	3 October 1998	National Championships	Ciechanów, Poland	
Clean & Jerk	212 kg	Krzysztof Siemion	23 September 2000	Olympic Games	Sydney, Australia	
Total	385 kg	Adrian Zieliński	4 August 2012	Olympic Games	London, Great Britain	
-94 kg
Snatch	185 kg	Tadeusz Drzazga	28 June 2003	National Championships	Ciechanów, Poland	
Clean & Jerk	235 kg	Szymon Kołecki	28 May 2000	National Championships	Ciechanów, Poland	
Total	412 kg	Szymon Kołecki	29 April 2000	European Championships	Sofia, Bulgaria	
-105 kg
Snatch	199 kg	Marcin Dołęga	7 May 2006	European Championships	Władysławowo, Poland	
Clean & Jerk	233 kg	Robert Dołęga	9 November 2003		Spała, Poland	
Total	424 kg	Marcin Dołęga	7 May 2006	European Championships	Władysławowo, Poland	
+105 kg
Snatch	201 kg	Marcin Dołęga	29 June 2008	National Championships	Zakliczyn, Poland	
Clean & Jerk	250 kg	Paweł Najdek	11 November 2001	World Championships	Antalya, Turkey	
Total	436 kg	Marcin Dołęga	29 June 2008	National Championships	Zakliczyn, Poland	

=== Women (2018–2025) ===
Event	Record	Athlete	Date	Meet	Place	Ref
45 kg
Snatch	61 kg	Oliwia Drzazga	22 August 2021		Ciechanów, Poland	
Clean & Jerk	85 kg	Oliwia Drzazga	6 October 2021	Youth World Championships	Jeddah, Saudi Arabia	
Total	143 kg	Oliwia Drzazga	6 October 2021	Youth World Championships	Jeddah, Saudi Arabia	
49 kg
Snatch	78 kg	Marlena Polakowska	26 November 2020	Polish Championships	Biłgoraj, Poland	
Clean & Jerk	97 kg	Oliwia Drzazga	28 June 2024	Polish Championships	Ciechanów, Poland	
Total	170 kg	Oliwia Drzazga	12 February 2024	European Championships	Sofia, Bulgaria	
55 kg
Snatch	89 kg	Małgorzata Myjak	28 June 2024	Polish Championships	Ciechanów, Poland	
Clean & Jerk	112 kg	Joanna Łochowska	7 April 2019	European Championships	Batumi, Georgia	
Total	199 kg	Joanna Łochowska	7 April 2019	European Championships	Batumi, Georgia	
59 kg
Snatch	86 kg	Maria Połka	14 February 2024	European Championships	Sofia, Bulgaria	
Clean & Jerk	114 kg	Monika Szymanek	2 December 2023	Polish Cup	Bydgoszcz, Poland	
Total	196 kg	Monika Szymanek	2 December 2023	Polish Cup	Bydgoszcz, Poland	
64 kg
Snatch	98 kg	Wiktoria Wołk	28 June 2024	Polish Championships	Ciechanów, Poland	
Clean & Jerk	121 kg	Wiktoria Wołk	15 February 2024	European Championships	Sofia, Bulgaria	
Total	215 kg	Wiktoria Wołk	15 February 2024	European Championships	Sofia, Bulgaria	
71 kg
Snatch	105 kg	Monika Marach	30 October 2024	European Junior Championships	Raszyn, Poland	
Clean & Jerk	121 kg	Martyna Dołęga	30 July 2023			
Total	226 kg	Monika Marach	30 October 2024	European Junior Championships	Raszyn, Poland	
76 kg
Snatch	103 kg	Monika Marach	16 November 2024			
Clean & Jerk	120 kg	Martyna Dołęga	16 June 2023			
Total	223 kg	Monika Marach	16 November 2024			
81 kg
Snatch	110 kg	Weronika Zielińska-Stubińska	9 April 2024	World Cup	Phuket, Thailand	
Clean & Jerk	135 kg	Weronika Zielińska-Stubińska	2 December 2023	Polish Cup	Bydgoszcz, Poland	
Total	242 kg	Weronika Zielińska-Stubińska	2 December 2023	Polish Cup	Bydgoszcz, Poland	
87 kg
Snatch	103 kg	Kinga Kaczmarczyk	10 April 2021	European Championships	Moscow, Russia	
Clean & Jerk	127 kg	Kinga Kaczmarczyk	10 April 2021	European Championships	Moscow, Russia	
Total	230 kg	Kinga Kaczmarczyk	10 April 2021	European Championships	Moscow, Russia	
+87 kg
Snatch	105 kg	Aleksandra Mierzejewska	10 November 2018	World Championships	Ashgabat, Turkmenistan	
Clean & Jerk	133 kg	Standard				
Total	235 kg	Aleksandra Mierzejewska	10 November 2018	World Championships	Ashgabat, Turkmenistan	

=== Women (1998–2018) ===
Event	Record	Athlete	Date	Meet	Place	Ref
48 kg
Snatch	85 kg	Marzena Karpińska	9 April 2012	European Championships	Antalya, Turkey	
Clean & Jerk	102 kg	Marzena Karpińska	9 April 2012	European Championships	Antalya, Turkey	
Total	187 kg	Marzena Karpińska	9 April 2012	European Championships	Antalya, Turkey	
53 kg
Snatch	89 kg	Joanna Łochowska	4 November 2017	Polish Championships	Zamość, Poland	
Clean & Jerk	112 kg	Aleksandra Klejnowska	5 September 2008		Siedlce, Poland	
Total	200 kg	Aleksandra Klejnowska	5 September 2008		Siedlce, Poland	
58 kg
Snatch	98 kg	Marieta Gotfryd	17 October 2004		Glinojeck, Poland	
Clean & Jerk	127 kg	Aleksandra Klejnowska	20 April 2004	European Championships	Kyiv, Ukraine	
Total	222 kg	Aleksandra Klejnowska	20 April 2004	European Championships	Kyiv, Ukraine	
63 kg
Snatch	102 kg	Dominika Misterska	1 July 2004	World Championships for University and College Students	Emmitsburg, United States	
Clean & Jerk	127 kg	Dominika Misterska	25 April 2001	European Championships	Trenčín, Slovakia	
Total	227 kg	Dominika Misterska	25 April 2001	European Championships	Trenčín, Slovakia	
69 kg
Snatch	102 kg	Ewa Mizdal	13 April 2012	European Championships	Antalya, Turkey	
Clean & Jerk	130 kg	Ewa Mizdal	13 April 2012	European Championships	Antalya, Turkey	
Total	232 kg	Ewa Mizdal	13 April 2012	European Championships	Antalya, Turkey	
75 kg
Snatch	106 kg	Ewa Mizdal	25 October 2013	World Championships	Wrocław, Poland	
Clean & Jerk	131 kg	Ewa Mizdal	3 June 2012	National Championships	Piekary Śląskie, Poland	
Total	236 kg	Ewa Mizdal	3 June 2012	National Championships	Piekary Śląskie, Poland	
90 kg
Snatch	101 kg	Małgorzata Wiejak	7 April 2017	European Championships	Split, Croatia	
Clean & Jerk	129 kg	Kinga Kaczmarczyk	31 March 2018	European Championships	Bucharest, Romania	
Total	225 kg	Małgorzata Wiejak	7 April 2017	European Championships	Split, Croatia	
+90 kg
Snatch	106 kg	Aleksandra Mierzejewska	29 September 2018		Kobierzyce, Poland	
Clean & Jerk	136 kg	Magdalena Karolak	26 October 2018		Zamość, Poland	
Total	239 kg	Magdalena Karolak	26 October 2018		Zamość, Poland	
