= 2009 in weightlifting =

This article lists the main weightlifting events and their results for 2009.

== World weightlifting championships ==
- May 19 – ?: 2009 World Youth Weightlifting Championships in (Thailand) Chiang Mai
  - China won both the gold and overall medal tallies.
- June 14 – ?: 2009 World Junior Weightlifting Championships in (Romania) Bucharest
  - China won both the gold and overall medal tallies.
- November 19 – 29: 2009 World Weightlifting Championships in (South Korea) Goyang
  - China won both the gold and overall medal tallies.

== Continental & regional weightlifting championships ==
- March 18 – ?: 2009 European Union Weightlifting Championships in (Poland) Ciechanów
  - Men's 56 kg winner: (Poland) Maciej Przepiórkiewicz
  - Men's 62 kg winner: (Poland) Damian Wisniewski
  - Men's 69 kg winner: (Spain) Isaac Julian Morillas Sanchez
  - Men's 77 kg winner: (Poland) Roman Klis
  - Women's 48 kg winner: (Spain) María Cabrera
  - Women's 53 kg winner: (Poland) Marzena Karpińska
  - Women's 58 kg winner: (Poland) Joanna Łochowska
  - Women's 63 kg winner: (Spain) Sheila Ramos Gonzalez
- April 4 – ?: 2009 European Weightlifting Championships in (Romania) Bucharest
  - Russia won both the gold and overall medal tallies.
- May 9 – ?: 2009 Asian Weightlifting Championships in (Kazakhstan) Taldıqorğan
  - China won both the gold and overall medal tallies.
- May 12 – ?: 2009 Oceania Senior & Junior Weightlifting Championships in Darwin
  - Senior: Australia won both the gold and overall medal tallies.
  - Junior: Australia won both the gold and overall medal tallies.
- June 3 – ?: 2009 Pan American Weightlifting Championships in (United States) Chicago
  - Colombia won both the gold and overall medal tallies.
- July 1 – ?: 2009 GCC Senior & Junior Weightlifting Championships in (United Arab Emirates) Fujairah
  - Senior (Men only): Saudi Arabia won both the gold and overall medal tallies.
  - Junior (Men only): Saudi Arabia won the gold medal tally. Saudi Arabia and Kuwait won 8 overall medals each.
- July 25 – ?: 2009 European Junior Weightlifting Championships in (Sweden) Landskrona
  - Bulgaria and Turkey won 3 gold medals each. Russia won the overall medal tally.
- July 31 – ?: 2009 African Senior, Junior, & Youth Weightlifting Championships in Kampala
  - Senior: Tunisia won the gold medal tally. Cameroon won the overall medal tally.
  - Junior: Cameroon, Egypt, and South Africa won 3 gold medals each. Cameroon, Egypt, South Africa, Tunisia, and Uganda won 6 overall medals each.
  - Youth: Egypt won both the gold and overall medal tallies.
- September 6 – ?: 2009 European Youth Weightlifting Championships in (Israel) Eilat
  - Russia won both the gold and overall medal tallies.
- October 11 – ?: 2009 European U23 Weightlifting Championships in Władysławowo
  - Poland won the gold medal tally. Russia won the overall medal tally.
- October 19 – ?: 2009 Commonwealth Senior & Junior Weightlifting Championships in (Malaysia) Penang
  - Senior: India won both the gold and overall medal tallies.
  - Junior: India won both the gold and overall medal tallies.
- October 20 – ?: 2009 Pan American Youth Weightlifting Championships in Puerto Rico
  - Puerto Rico won both the gold and overall medal tallies.
- December 16 – ?: 2009 Asian Junior Weightlifting Championships in (United Arab Emirates) Dubai
  - China won both the gold and overall medal tallies.
