= Ngangbam =

Ngangbam is a Meitei family name. Notable people with the surname are:

- Ngangbam Sweety Devi, Indian professional footballer
- Ngangbam Soniya Chanu, Indian woman weightlifter
- Ngangbam Shantikumar Meetei, Taiwanese-Indian natural bodybuilding athlete as well as a professor
