= 2012 European Weightlifting Championships – Women's 48 kg =

The women's competition in the flyweight (– 48 kg) division was held on 9 April 2012.

== Schedule ==
Date	Time	Event
9 April 2012	11:30	Group B
9 April 2012	17:30	Group A

== Medalists ==
Event	Gold		Silver		Bronze	
Snatch	Marzena Karpińska (POL)	85 kg	Genny Pagliaro (ITA)	81 kg	Silviya Angelova (AZE)	78 kg
Clean & Jerk	Marzena Karpińska (POL)	102 kg	Nurdan Karagöz (TUR)	100 kg	Silviya Angelova (AZE)	97 kg
Total	Marzena Karpińska (POL)	187 kg	Nurdan Karagöz (TUR)	177 kg	Silviya Angelova (AZE)	175 kg

== Records ==
Prior to the competition, the following records were as follows.

World record	Snatch	Yang Lian (CHN)	98 kg	Santo Domingo, Dominican	1 October 2006
World record	Clean & Jerk	Nurcan Taylan (TUR)	121 kg	Antalya, Turkey	17 September 2010
World record	Total	Yang Lian (CHN)	217 kg	Santo Domingo, Dominican	1 October 2006

European record	Snatch	Nurcan Taylan (TUR)	97 kg	Athens, Greece	14 August 2004
European record	Clean & Jerk	Nurcan Taylan (TUR)	121 kg	Antalya, Turkey	17 September 2010
European record	Total	Nurcan Taylan (TUR)	214 kg	Antalya, Turkey	17 September 2010

== Results ==
Rank	Athlete	Group	Body weight	Snatch (kg)				Clean & Jerk (kg)				Total
Rank	Athlete	Group	Body weight	1	2	3	Rank	1	2	3	Rank	Total
1st place, gold medalist(s)	Marzena Karpińska (POL)	A	47.74	81	83	85	1st place, gold medalist(s)	98	100	102	1st place, gold medalist(s)	187
2nd place, silver medalist(s)	Nurdan Karagöz (TUR)	A	47.28	77	~~80~~	~~80~~	5	98	~~100~~	100	2nd place, silver medalist(s)	177
3rd place, bronze medalist(s)	Silviya Angelova (AZE)	A	47.84	72	75	78	3rd place, bronze medalist(s)	93	97	~~98~~	3rd place, bronze medalist(s)	175
4	Elena Andries (ROM)	A	47.93	78	~~81~~	~~81~~	4	95	~~98~~	~~98~~	4	173
5	Estefanía Juan (ESP)	A	47.64	70	75	~~78~~	6	90	94	~~97~~	5	169
6	Mélanie Bardis (FRA)	A	47.72	72	74	75	7	93	96	~~100~~	7	163
7	Anaïs Michel (FRA)	A	47.61	75	~~78~~	~~78~~	8	95	~~97~~	~~97~~	9	158
8	Giovanna D'Alessandro (ITA)	B	44.88	~~68~~	68	70	14	90	95	97	6	155
9	Natalia Draganova (BUL)	A	47.79	~~70~~	70	~~72~~	13	~~92~~	92	~~95~~	8	155
10	Joanne Calvino (GBR)	B	47.84	67	70	73	9	87	~~90~~	90	10	150
11	Alexandra Stepanova (LTU)	B	47.57	68	~~71~~	71	11	90	~~93~~	~~93~~	11	143
12	Veronika Veznikova (CZE)	B	47.82	67	~~71~~	71	10	87	~~92~~	~~92~~	13	120
13	Tea Suojanen (FIN)	B	47.64	45	48	~~51~~	16	57	60	~~62~~	13	108
14	Petra Klimparova (CZE)	B	47.88	65	~~68~~	~~68~~	15	57	~~60~~	~~60~~	14	106
—	Genny Pagliaro (ITA)	A	47.76	77	~~81~~	81	2nd place, silver medalist(s)	~~95~~	~~95~~	~~95~~	—	—
—	Hannah Powell (GBR)	B	45.19	~~61~~	61	~~65~~	13	~~80~~	~~80~~	~~80~~	—	—
