= 2007 Asian Weightlifting Championships =

International weightlifting competition

The 2007 Asian Weightlifting Championships were held at the Taishan College Gymnasium in Tai'an Shandong in PR China between April 17 and April 28 2007. It was the 38th men's and 19th women's championship. The event was organised by the Asian Weightlifting Federation.

Training before the event was done in the Weightlifting Training Hall of the Tai’an Comprehensive Gymnasium, with 20 training platforms.

== Medal summary ==
=== Men ===
Event	Gold		Silver		Bronze	
56 kg
Snatch	Hoàng Anh Tuấn; Vietnam	126 kg	Li Lizhi; China	125 kg	Chen Biao; China	123 kg
Clean & Jerk	Chen Biao; China	157 kg	Hoàng Anh Tuấn; Vietnam	156 kg	Li Lizhi; China	153 kg
Total	Hoàng Anh Tuấn; Vietnam	282 kg	Chen Biao; China	280 kg	Li Lizhi; China	278 kg
62 kg
Snatch	Qiu Le; China	138 kg	Yang Fan; China	138 kg	Nguyễn Mạnh Thắng; Vietnam	125 kg
Clean & Jerk	Qiu Le; China	177 kg	Yang Fan; China	177 kg	Abdullatif Al-Abdullatif; Saudi Arabia	162 kg
Total	Qiu Le; China	315 kg	Yang Fan; China	315 kg	Abdullatif Al-Abdullatif; Saudi Arabia	283 kg
69 kg
Snatch	Shi Zhiyong; China	152 kg	Sitthisak Suphalak; Thailand	135 kg	Budi Setiawan; Indonesia	133 kg
Clean & Jerk	Shi Zhiyong; China	175 kg	Sitthisak Suphalak; Thailand	165 kg	Ronnayuth Amnoiwong; Thailand	165 kg
Total	Shi Zhiyong; China	327 kg	Sitthisak Suphalak; Thailand	300 kg	Budi Setiawan; Indonesia	294 kg
77 kg
Snatch	Li Hongli; China	168 kg	Nader Sufyan Abbas; Qatar	145 kg	Vladimir Kuznetsov; Kazakhstan	142 kg
Clean & Jerk	Li Hongli; China	201 kg	Sandow Nasution; Indonesia	188 kg	Kraisorn Dadtuyawat; Thailand	183 kg
Total	Li Hongli; China	369 kg	Sandow Nasution; Indonesia	328 kg	Vladimir Kuznetsov; Kazakhstan	322 kg
85 kg
Snatch	Jiang Hairong; China	173 kg	Lee Se-won; South Korea	153 kg	Shahrouz Ghorbani; Iran	153 kg
Clean & Jerk	Jiang Hairong; China	200 kg	Ulanbek Moldodosov; Kyrgyzstan	187 kg	Her Jin; South Korea	185 kg
Total	Jiang Hairong; China	373 kg	Ulanbek Moldodosov; Kyrgyzstan	337 kg	Lee Se-won; South Korea	330 kg
94 kg
Snatch	Ruslan Kapaev; Kyrgyzstan	158 kg	Lee Hyoung-do; South Korea	156 kg	Navab Nassirshalal; Iran	154 kg
Clean & Jerk	Hsieh Wei-chun; Chinese Taipei	196 kg	Ruslan Kapaev; Kyrgyzstan	195 kg	Suthiphon Watthanakasikam; Thailand	193 kg
Total	Ruslan Kapaev; Kyrgyzstan	353 kg	Lee Hyoung-do; South Korea	347 kg	Suthiphon Watthanakasikam; Thailand	345 kg
105 kg
Snatch	Said Saif Asaad; Qatar	177 kg	Ahed Joughili; Syria	172 kg	Bakhyt Akhmetov; Kazakhstan	160 kg
Clean & Jerk	Ahed Joughili; Syria	222 kg	Said Saif Asaad; Qatar	200 kg	Hamed Mansouri; Iran	196 kg
Total	Ahed Joughili; Syria	394 kg	Said Saif Asaad; Qatar	377 kg	Bakhyt Akhmetov; Kazakhstan	350 kg
+105 kg
Snatch	Sun Haibo; China	201 kg	Jaber Saeed Salem; Qatar	192 kg	Vahid Rabiei; Iran	188 kg
Clean & Jerk	Jaber Saeed Salem; Qatar	235 kg	Sun Haibo; China	230 kg	Vahid Rabiei; Iran	220 kg
Total	Sun Haibo; China	431 kg	Jaber Saeed Salem; Qatar	427 kg	Vahid Rabiei; Iran	408 kg

=== Women ===
Event	Gold		Silver		Bronze	
48 kg
Snatch	Chen Xiexia; China	95 kg	Pramsiri Bunphithak; Thailand	85 kg	Ngô Thị Nga; Vietnam	83 kg
Clean & Jerk	Chen Xiexia; China	120 kg WR	Pramsiri Bunphithak; Thailand	111 kg	Pensiri Laosirikul; Thailand	110 kg
Total	Chen Xiexia; China	215 kg	Pramsiri Bunphithak; Thailand	196 kg	Pensiri Laosirikul; Thailand	191 kg
53 kg
Snatch	Prapawadee Jaroenrattanatarakoon; Thailand	96 kg	Li Ping; China	96 kg	Yu Weili; Hong Kong	85 kg
Clean & Jerk	Li Ping; China	129 kg WR	Prapawadee Jaroenrattanatarakoon; Thailand	122 kg	Yu Weili; Hong Kong	106 kg
Total	Li Ping; China	225 kg	Prapawadee Jaroenrattanatarakoon; Thailand	218 kg	Yu Weili; Hong Kong	191 kg
58 kg
Snatch	Qiu Hongmei; China	100 kg	Wandee Kameaim; Thailand	92 kg	Yumnam Chanu; India	90 kg
Clean & Jerk	Qiu Hongmei; China	141 kg WR	Wandee Kameaim; Thailand	122 kg	Sureerat Thongsuk; Thailand	114 kg
Total	Qiu Hongmei; China	241 kg	Wandee Kameaim; Thailand	214 kg	Yumnam Chanu; India	204 kg
63 kg
Snatch	Shu Jiean; China	110 kg	Nguyễn Thị Thiết; Vietnam	95 kg	Frapti Tri Setiawati; Indonesia	88 kg
Clean & Jerk	Shu Jiean; China	138 kg	Nguyễn Thị Thiết; Vietnam	120 kg	Somarani Chanu; India	108 kg
Total	Shu Jiean; China	248 kg	Nguyễn Thị Thiết; Vietnam	215 kg	Somarani Chanu; India	188 kg
69 kg
Snatch	Liu Haixia; China	112 kg	Khuất Minh Hải; Vietnam	90 kg	Kao Ya-chun; Chinese Taipei	87 kg
Clean & Jerk	Liu Haixia; China	150 kg	Kao Ya-chun; Chinese Taipei	116 kg	Khuất Minh Hải; Vietnam	115 kg
Total	Liu Haixia; China	262 kg	Khuất Minh Hải; Vietnam	205 kg	Kao Ya-chun; Chinese Taipei	203 kg
75 kg
Snatch	Cao Lei; China	115 kg	Nguyễn Thị Phương Loan; Vietnam	100 kg	Yang Houqin; Macau	98 kg
Clean & Jerk	Cao Lei; China	140 kg	Sinta Darmariani; Indonesia	128 kg	Nguyễn Thị Phương Loan; Vietnam	127 kg
Total	Cao Lei; China	255 kg	Nguyễn Thị Phương Loan; Vietnam	227 kg	Irina Vlassova; Kazakhstan	219 kg
+75 kg
Snatch	Mu Shuangshuang; China	132 kg	Annipa Moontar; Thailand	115 kg	Alexandra Aborneva; Kazakhstan	105 kg
Clean & Jerk	Mu Shuangshuang; China	173 kg	Annipa Moontar; Thailand	150 kg	Geeta Rani; India	137 kg
Total	Mu Shuangshuang; China	305 kg	Annipa Moontar; Thailand	265 kg	Geeta Rani; India	239 kg

== Medal table ==
Ranking by Big (Total result) medals

Rank	Nation	Gold	Silver	Bronze	Total
1	China	12	2	1	15
2	Vietnam	1	3	0	4
3	Kyrgyzstan	1	1	0	2
4	Syria	1	0	0	1
5	Thailand	0	5	2	7
6	Qatar	0	2	0	2
7	Indonesia	0	1	1	2
7	South Korea	0	1	1	2
9	India	0	0	3	3
9	Kazakhstan	0	0	3	3
11	Chinese Taipei	0	0	1	1
11	Hong Kong	0	0	1	1
11	Iran	0	0	1	1
11	Saudi Arabia	0	0	1	1
Totals (14 entries)		15	15	15	45

Ranking by all medals: Big (Total result) and Small (Snatch and Clean & Jerk)

Rank	Nation	Gold	Silver	Bronze	Total
1	China	35	7	3	45
2	Vietnam	2	8	4	14
3	Qatar	2	5	0	7
4	Kyrgyzstan	2	3	0	5
5	Syria	2	1	0	3
6	Thailand	1	14	7	22
7	Chinese Taipei	1	1	2	4
8	Indonesia	0	3	3	6
9	South Korea	0	3	2	5
10	India	0	0	6	6
10	Iran	0	0	6	6
10	Kazakhstan	0	0	6	6
13	Hong Kong	0	0	3	3
14	Saudi Arabia	0	0	2	2
15	Macau	0	0	1	1
Totals (15 entries)		45	45	45	135

== Participating nations ==
130 athletes from 19 nations competed.

- China (15)
- Chinese Taipei (6)
- Hong Kong (1)
- India (5)
- Indonesia (7)
- Iran (8)
- Japan (3)
- Kazakhstan (9)
- Kuwait (4)
- Kyrgyzstan (5)
- Macau (1)
- Qatar (4)
- Saudi Arabia (5)
- South Korea (8)
- Syria (5)
- Thailand (15)
- Turkmenistan (8)
- Uzbekistan (8)
- Vietnam (13)
