= Weightlifting at the 2012 Summer Olympics – Women's 48 kg =

Women's 48 kg at the Games of the XXX Olympiad
- Venue: ExCeL London
- Date: 28 July 2012
- Competitors: 14 from 12 nations

Medalists
1st place, gold medalist(s)		Wang Mingjuan	China
2nd place, silver medalist(s)		Hiromi Miyake	Japan
3rd place, bronze medalist(s)		Ryang Chun-hwa	North Korea

The women's 48 kilograms weightlifting event at the 2012 Summer Olympics in London, United Kingdom, took place at ExCeL London on 28 July.

== Summary ==
Total score was the sum of the lifter's best result in each of the snatch and the clean and jerk, with three lifts allowed for each lift. In case of a tie, the lighter lifter won; if still tied, the lifter who took the fewest attempts to achieve the total score won. Lifters without a valid snatch score did not perform the clean and jerk.

== Schedule ==
All times are British Summer Time (UTC+01:00)

Date	Time	Event
28 July 2012	15:30	Group A

== Records ==
Prior to this competition, the existing world and Olympic records were as follows.

World Record	Snatch	Yang Lian (CHN)	98 kg	Santo Domingo, Dominican	1 October 2006
World Record	Clean & Jerk	~~Nurcan Taylan (TUR)~~; Chen Xiexia (CHN)	~~121 kg~~ 120 kg	~~Antalya, Turkey~~; Tai'an, China	~~17 September 2010~~; 21 April 2007
World Record	Total	Yang Lian (CHN)	217 kg	Santo Domingo, Dominican	1 October 2006
Olympic Record	Snatch	Nurcan Taylan (TUR)	97 kg	Athens, Greece	14 August 2004
Olympic Record	Clean & Jerk	~~Chen Xiexia (CHN)~~; Aree Wiratthaworn (THA)	~~117 kg~~ 115 kg	~~Beijing, China~~; Athens, Greece	~~9 August 2008~~; 14 August 2004
Olympic Record	Total	~~Chen Xiexia (CHN)~~; Nurcan Taylan (TUR)	~~212 kg~~ 210 kg	~~Beijing, China~~; Athens, Greece	~~9 August 2008~~; 14 August 2004

- Chen Xiexia's Olympic records were rescinded in 2017.
- Nurcan Taylan's world record was rescinded in 2021.

== Results ==
Rank	Athlete	Group	Body weight	Snatch (kg)				Clean & Jerk (kg)				Total
Rank	Athlete	Group	Body weight	1	2	3	Result	1	2	3	Result	Total
1st place, gold medalist(s)	Wang Mingjuan (CHN)	A	47.73	~~88~~	88	91	91	110	114	~~116~~	114	205
2nd place, silver medalist(s)	Hiromi Miyake (JPN)	A	47.74	83	85	87	87	108	110	~~113~~	110	197
3rd place, bronze medalist(s)	Ryang Chun-hwa (PRK)	A	47.52	80	~~83~~	~~84~~	80	~~108~~	109	112	112	192
4	Sirivimon Pramongkhol (THA)	A	47.23	78	~~80~~	82	82	106	~~108~~	109	109	191
5	Nurdan Karagöz (TUR)	A	46.99	80	83	~~84~~	83	104	~~107~~	~~107~~	104	187
6	Honami Mizuochi (JPN)	A	47.77	76	78	80	80	92	94	96	96	176
7	Ngangbam Soniya Chanu (IND)	A	47.74	72	74	~~75~~	74	93	~~97~~	97	97	171
8	Betsi Rivas (VEN)	A	47.43	68	~~70~~	70	70	92	96	98	98	168
9	Beatriz Pirón (DOM)	A	47.85	72	75	77	77	87	90	~~92~~	90	167
10	Mélanie Bardis (FRA)	A	47.71	70	73	~~75~~	73	88	91	93	93	166
11	Lely Burgos (PUR)	A	47.61	65	~~70~~	~~70~~	65	87	~~92~~	92	92	157
12	Nathalia Rakotondramanana (MAD)	A	47.74	~~55~~	55	~~60~~	55	75	80	~~82~~	80	135
—	Panida Khamsri (THA)	A	47.45	~~81~~	~~81~~	~~81~~	—	—	—	—	—	—
—	Marina Sisoeva (UZB)	A	47.85	~~79~~	~~79~~	~~80~~	—	—	—	—	—	—
