= Dominic Lussier =

Canadian weightlifter (born 1984)

Personal information
- Full name: Dominic Lussier
- Born: 10 March 1984 (age 42)
- Weight: 68.44 kg (150.9 lb)

Sport
- Country: Canada
- Sport: Weightlifting
- Team: National team
- Updated on 6 September 2016

Dominic Lussier (born 10 March 1984) is a Canadian male weightlifter, competing in the 69 kg category and representing Canada at international competitions. He competed at world championships, most recently at the 2011 World Weightlifting Championships.

== Major results ==
| Year | Venue | Weight | Snatch (kg) | | | | Clean & Jerk (kg) | | | | Total | Rank |
| Year | Venue | Weight | 1 | 2 | 3 | Rank | 1 | 2 | 3 | Rank | Total | Rank |
World Championships
| 2011 | Paris, France | 69 kg | 120 | ~~124~~ | ~~124~~ | 42 | 141 | ~~146~~ | 146 | 40 | 266 | 4 |
Commonwealth Games
| 2010 | Delhi, India | 69 kg | 120 | 125 | 127 | —N/a | 145 | 150 | ~~154~~ | —N/a | 277 | 7 |
