= Kulsoom Abdullah =

Pakistani-American weightlifter

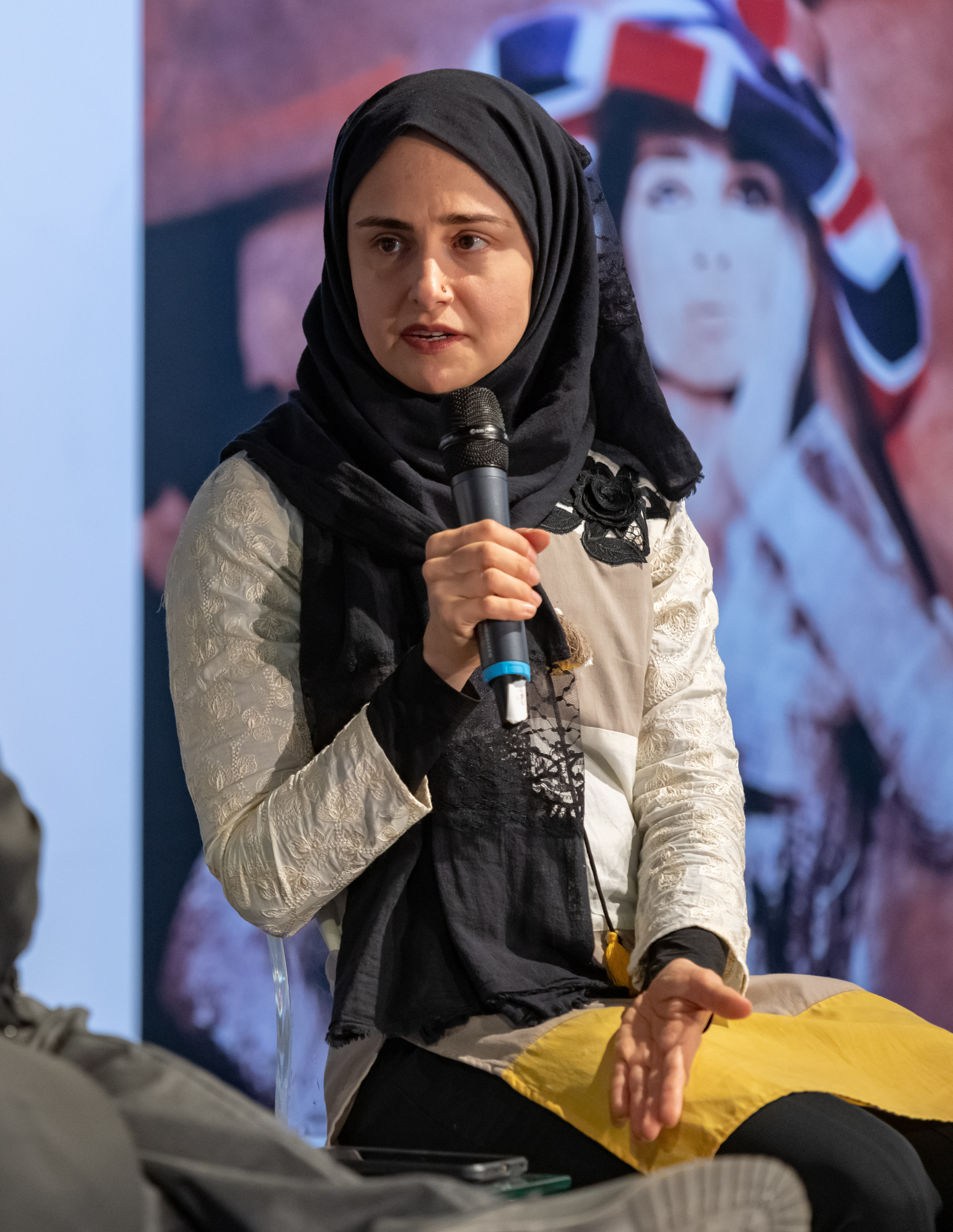
- Born: 12 March 1976 (age 50); Kansas City, Missouri, US
- Occupation: Data scientist
- Known for: First female Pakistani weightlifter to compete in the World Championships, first weightlifter to wear a hijab, covered arms and legs, in competition

Kulsoom Beenazir Abdullah Kakakhel (born 12 March 1976) is a Pakistani-American weightlifter who became the first female weightlifter representing Pakistan when she competed at the 2011 World Championships. The same year she made history when, in keeping with her religious views, she became the first woman to compete in hijab (head scarf), covered arms and legs after the International Weightlifting Federation (IWF) modified its rules to accommodate her request to do so.

== Biography ==
Kulsoom Abdullah was born in Kansas City, Missouri and grew up in Okeechobee, Florida. She frequently visited Pakistan while growing up and speaks Pashto. She has a Master's degree and PhD in electrical and computer engineering from the Georgia Institute of Technology. She began weightlifting while she was a graduate student as a training method for taekwondo. After being denied the right to compete at a USA National Weightlifting competition in modest clothing, where CEO John Duff in an email to Abdullah “As USA Weightlifting is governed by the rules of the International Weightlifting Federation, we must adhere to those regulations and therefore reject your request, as is, to modify your competition costume,” Kulsoom Abdullah sought help from Civil Rights and government organizations. Because USAW and USOC are private organizations, they could not help her. The Council on American-Islamic Relations (CAIR) issued a press release on her behalf. She received attention from National and International news outlets about her challenge to compete at USA National competitions. After the media attention and CAIR's intervention, the USOC and USAW agreed to bring this to the attention of the International Weightlifting Federation (IWF). Kulsoom Abdullah detailing clothing options that she says would meet her Muslim modesty requirements, allow competition officials to make clear calls and avoid concerns that she was obtaining any competitive advantage. To allow Abdullah to participate by modifying their regulations to allow her to compete with her head, arms, and legs covered. In a 2011 article, Nancy Hogshead-Maker stated, "in a contemplative world, we would think about how to come up with attire that would bring out the best in all competitors, regardless what their religious or personal level of modesty is. This is not a beauty contest, not a religious litmus test." International rules originally required the arms and legs of competitors to be bare so that judges could determine when a lift was successful.

== Early life ==
Abdullah was born in Kansas city, USA. She was born to Pakistani parents from the Khyber Pakhtunkhwa region who immigrated to the U.S. Her father was a medical professional who immigrated to U.S. after securing a job in the field of medicine.

Abdullah grew up in Okeechobee; a small town in Florida where she also completed her High School at the Okeechobee High School. She later received a scholarship from University of Central Florida for a Bachelor's program in Computer Engineering with a minor in Math.

== Professional life ==
=== Weightlifting career ===
Kulsoom Abdullah began her career as a weightlifter in 2010 when she started taking part in the 105 and 16 pound classes where she was able to finish 23rd of 27 and enroll for local Olympics competitions. After that, she was chosen by Pakistan Weightlifting Federation as the first female weightlifter to represent the country in international competitions. Abdullah later qualified for the American Open weightlifting event in which she was unable to participate due to the organization denying her permission to participate as her costume did not comply with the dress code rules. In 2011, Abdullah became the first Pakistani woman to participate in the World Weightlifting Championship. In 2012, she represented Pakistan at the Asian Weightlifting Championships, held in South Korea. She took a break from weightlifting championships in 2013, however she continued participating in local competitions.

==== Religious observance and weightlifting ====
Kulsoom Abdullah is a practicing Muslim. Her religion obliges her to cover her body, including arms, legs and wear a headscarf. In 2011, Abdullah qualified for the American Open Weightlifting competition, however the tournament required dress code that exposed participant's elbows and knees for the judges. Although Abdullah put in a request to ease the dress code for her and other Muslim women, her request was rejected. Abdullah's issue was taken to the International Weightlifting Federation (IWF). During this time, Abdullah started a website where she wrote about her struggles and her cause. Her case received widespread media coverage. Abdullah sought help from Council of American-Islamic Relations to forward her request to the USOC to allow ease in dress code for Muslim women. Her request was put on the USOC's technical committee's agenda by Dragomir Cioroslan, vice president of IWF and was later approved at the IWF congress in Malaysia. The IWF allowed the use of tight-fitting clothing that could be worn underneath the regular weightlifting costume and said that headscarf has always been allowed in competitions.

==== Major results ====
Year	Venue	Weight	Snatch (kg)				Clean & Jerk (kg)				Total	Rank
Year	Venue	Weight	1	2	3	Rank	1	2	3	Rank	Total	Rank
World Championships
2011	Paris, France	48 kg	~~37~~	37	40	24	48	52	~~55~~	23	92	22
Asian Championships
2012	Pyeongtaek, South Korea	53 kg	40	~~42~~	42	16	52	~~55~~	~~55~~	17	94	16

=== Scientific career ===
Abdullah is a Computer Engineering professional who worked as a data scientist prior to weightlifting. She has also been part of the deeplearning.ai in the field of data science. She is currently an instructor at the Georgia State University.

== Personal life ==
Abdullah has become the face of Muslim women in sports and has featured in coverage regarding Muslim women. Abdullah was featured in the documentary The Pakistan Four: Four strangers in America redefining the narrative of being a Pakistani Muslim woman, released in 2014. The film also featured Hareem Ahmad, saber fencer, Nadia Manzoor, stand-up comic, and chef Fatima Ali. She received the Georgia Influential Muslim Award, featured in the 2015-2016 Saris To Suits calendar, and was also a speaker on a panel at the Religion Newswriters Association.

Abdullah speaks English and Pushto languages.

== Activism ==
Abdullah is an activist for Muslim women in sports. Since her debut in professional weightlifting, Abdullah has been part of multiple opportunities. in 2015, she along with four other Muslim women from around the world formed a team known as Shirzanan for the RAGBRAI; a bicycle ride event organized by The Des Moines Register. The team aimed to empower Muslim women in sports.

Abdullah also advocates for women in STEM, particularly women in machine learning and data science. She is also a writer at Omdena where she writes about the challenges of women in machine learning and advocates for their inclusion in the field. She is also part of AI for good and AI wonder girls; a community founded to support women in AI.

== See also ==
- Muslim women in sport
