= Weightlifting at the 2008 Summer Olympics – Women's 48 kg =

Women's 48 kg at the Games of the XXIX Olympiad
- Venue: Beihang University Gymnasium
- Date: 9 August 2008
- Competitors: 14 from 11 nations

Medalists
1st place, gold medalist(s)		Chen Wei-ling	Chinese Taipei
2nd place, silver medalist(s)		Im Jyoung-hwa	South Korea
3rd place, bronze medalist(s)		Pensiri Laosirikul	Thailand

The women's 48 kilograms weightlifting event is the lightest women's event at the weightlifting competition, limiting competitors to a maximum of 48 kilograms of body mass. The competition took place on August 9 at 10:00 and was the first Weightlifting event to conclude. It was the second set of medals to be awarded at the Games, a few moments after the women's 10m Air Rifle.

Each lifter performed in both the snatch and clean and jerk lifts, with the final score being the sum of the lifter's best result in each. The athlete received three attempts in each of the two lifts; the score for the lift was the heaviest weight successfully lifted.

Chen Xiexia and Sibel Özkan initially won the gold and the silver medals, but in 2016 their results were annulled due to a doping violation from a reanalysis of samples from 2008.

== Schedule ==
All times are China Standard Time (UTC+08:00)

Date	Time	Event
9 August 2008	10:00	Group A

== Records ==
Prior to this competition, the existing world and Olympic records were as follows.

World Record	Snatch	Yang Lian (CHN)	98 kg	Santo Domingo, Dominican	1 October 2006
World Record	Clean & Jerk	Chen Xiexia (CHN)	120 kg	Tai'an, China	21 April 2007
World Record	Total	Yang Lian (CHN)	217 kg	Santo Domingo, Dominican	1 October 2006
Olympic Record	Snatch	Nurcan Taylan (TUR)	97 kg	Athens, Greece	14 August 2004
Olympic Record	Clean & Jerk	Aree Wiratthaworn (THA)	115 kg	Athens, Greece	14 August 2004
Olympic Record	Total	Nurcan Taylan (TUR)	210 kg	Athens, Greece	14 August 2004

== Results ==
Rank	Athlete	Group	Body weight	Snatch (kg)				Clean & Jerk (kg)				Total
Rank	Athlete	Group	Body weight	1	2	3	Result	1	2	3	Result	Total
1st place, gold medalist(s)	Chen Wei-ling (TPE)	A	47.11	84	~~87~~	~~87~~	84	108	112	~~115~~	112	196
2nd place, silver medalist(s)	Im Jyoung-hwa (KOR)	A	47.62	83	86	~~88~~	86	106	110	~~113~~	110	196
3rd place, bronze medalist(s)	Pensiri Laosirikul (THA)	A	47.67	~~85~~	~~85~~	85	85	110	~~114~~	~~114~~	110	195
4	Hiromi Miyake (JPN)	A	47.35	80	~~82~~	~~82~~	80	105	~~110~~	~~110~~	105	185
5	Mélanie Noël (FRA)	A	47.91	75	78	80	80	97	~~100~~	~~100~~	97	177
6	Misaki Oshiro (JPN)	A	47.62	77	~~80~~	80	80	92	~~96~~	~~96~~	92	172
7	Marzena Karpińska (POL)	A	47.62	79	~~82~~	~~82~~	79	~~92~~	92	~~97~~	92	171
8	Marilou Dozois-Prévost (CAN)	A	47.75	73	76	~~78~~	76	~~90~~	90	~~96~~	90	166
9	Karla Moreno (NCA)	A	47.07	~~65~~	65	~~71~~	65	~~83~~	83	85	85	150
—	Pramsiri Bunphithak (THA)	A	47.95	~~84~~	~~84~~	~~84~~	—	—	—	—	—	—
—	Genny Pagliaro (ITA)	A	47.85	~~82~~	~~82~~	~~82~~	—	—	—	—	—	—
DQ	Chen Xiexia (CHN)	A	47.46	90	93	95	95	113	115	117	117	~~212~~
DQ	Sibel Özkan (TUR)	A	47.80	86	~~88~~	88	88	~~108~~	108	111	111	~~199~~
DQ	Nurcan Taylan (TUR)	A	47.84	~~84~~	~~84~~	~~84~~	—	—	—	—	—	—

- Chen Xiexia of China originally won the gold medal, but she was disqualified following a positive anti-doping test of her 2008 sample.
- Sibel Özkan of Turkey originally won the silver medal, but she was disqualified following a positive anti-doping test of her 2008 sample. On 1 December 2016, the Court of Arbitration for Sport dismissed Özkan's final appeal.

== New records ==
Clean & Jerk	~~117 kg~~	~~Chen Xiexia (CHN)~~	~~OR~~
Total	~~212 kg~~	~~Chen Xiexia (CHN)~~	~~OR~~
