= Weightlifting at the 2009 SEA Games =

Weightlifting was contested by both men and women at the 2009 SEA Games in Vientiane, Laos. The Weightlifting Events were held at Pornsawan School, from 10 December to 13 December 2009, with 13 gold medals up for contention. There are six weight categories for the women and seven for the men.

== Medal table ==
Rank	Nation	Gold	Silver	Bronze	Total
1	Indonesia	5	1	1	7
2	Thailand	4	4	0	8
3	Vietnam	2	2	2	6
4	Myanmar	1	2	5	8
5	Laos	1	0	1	2
6	Malaysia	0	3	2	5
7	Philippines	0	1	1	2
Totals (7 entries)		13	13	12	38

== Medalists ==
=== Men ===
Event	Gold	Silver	Bronze
56 kg	Jadi Setiadi; Indonesia	Pyae Phyo; Myanmar	Amirul Hamizan Ibrahim; Malaysia
62 kg	Eko Yuli Irawan; Indonesia	Pongsak Maneetong; Thailand	Nguyen Manh Thang; Vietnam
69 kg	Triyatno; Indonesia	Phaisan Hansawong; Thailand	Kyaw Moe Win; Myanmar
77 kg	Duong Thanh Truc; Vietnam	Zulkifli; Malaysia	Pyae Phyo Swe; Malaysia
85 kg	Pitaya Tibnoke; Thailand	Shwe Lin Htut; Myanmar	Hoang Tan Tai; Vietnam
94 kg	Suthiphon Watthanakasiram; Thailand	Mohd Faiz; Malaysia	Renante Briones; Philippines
Over 94 kg	Khunchai Nuchpum; Thailand	Joselito Padilla; Philippines	

=== Women ===
Event	Gold	Silver	Bronze
48 kg	Pramsiri Bunphithak; Thailand	Ngo Thi Nga; Vietnam	Zaira Zakaria; Malaysia
53 kg	Kheuakham Ly; Laos	Raihan; Malaysia	Aye Thanda Lwin; Myanmar
58 kg	Raema Lisa Rumbewas; Indonesia	Pimsiri Sirikaew; Thailand	Lortoungdaue Mailor; Laos
63 kg	Okta Dwi Pramita; Indonesia	Thi Thiet Nguyen; Vietnam	Thaw Yae Faw; Myanmar
69 kg	Nguyen Thi Phuong; Vietnam	Sinta Darmariani; Indonesia	Yar Thet Pan; Myanmar
Over 69 kg	Zay Zay Latt; Myanmar	Annipa Moontar; Thailand	Novi Yanti; Indonesia

== Results ==
=== Men ===
==== 56 Kilogram ====
10 December

Athlete	NOC	Weight (Kg)	Snatch	Clean & Jerk	Total
Jadi Setiadi	(Indonesia)	55.47	126	148	274
Pyae Phyo	(Myanmar)	55.03	119	147	266
Amirul Hamizan Ibrahim	(Malaysia)	55.93	118	147	265
Hoang Anh Tuan	(Vietnam)	55.93	125		DNF

==== 62 Kilogram ====
11 December

Athlete	NOC	Weight (Kg)	Snatch	Clean & Jerk	Total
Eko Yuli Irawan	(Indonesia)	61.66	135	165	300
Pongsak Maneetong	(Thailand)	61.82	120	158	278
Nguyen Manh Thang	(Vietnam)	61.48	123	154	277
Naharudin	(Malaysia)	61.72	122	142	264
Jaymark Perez	(Philippines)	61.51	100	130	230
Saykham	(Laos)	61.25	85	112	197

==== 69 Kilogram ====
11 December

Athlete	NOC	Weight (Kg)	Snatch	Clean & Jerk	Total
Triyatno	(Indonesia)	68.98	147	179	326
Phaisan Hansawong	(Thailand)	67.55	140	180	320
Kyaw Moe Win	(Myanmar)	67.83	137	166	303
Mohd Faerul	(Malaysia)	68.96	138	161	299
Jomar Napolereyes	(Philippines)	68.26	115	140	255
Khamphouvong	(Laos)	68.24	105	122	227
Nguyen Hong Ngoc	(Vietnam)	68.58	132		DNF

==== 77 Kilogram ====
12 December

Athlete	NOC	Weight (Kg)	Snatch	Clean & Jerk	Total
Duong Thanh Truc	(Vietnam)	76.28	126	169	295
Zulkifli	(Malaysia)	76.88	135	160	295
Pyae Phyo Swe	(Myanmar)	70.46	110	135	245
Thanouxay	(Laos)	71.91	106	125	231
Sandow Nasution	(Indonesia)	76.62			DNF

==== 85 Kilogram ====
13 December

Athlete	NOC	Weight (Kg)	Snatch	Clean & Jerk	Total
Pitaya Tibnoke	(Thailand)	84.55	150	182	332
Shwe Lin Htut	(Myanmar)	83.91	150	181	331
Tran Van Hoa	(Vietnam)	84.52	141	165	306
Bureros Christopher	(Philippines)	84.54	125	150	275
Savathtongdy Chanthaboun	(Laos)	79.68	100	120	220
Lourenco Da Costa	(Timor-Leste)	81.97	70	100	170

==== 94 Kilogram ====
13 December

Athlete	NOC	Weight (Kg)	Snatch	Clean & Jerk	Total
Suthiphon Watthanakasikam	(Thailand)	92.55	168	192	360
Mohd Faiz	(Malaysia)	92.67	135	165	300
Renante Briones	(Philippines)	93.25	130	155	285
Sengdala Bountun	(Laos)	85.66	104	115	219

==== Above 94 Kilogram ====
13 December

Athlete	NOC	Weight (Kg)	Snatch	Clean & Jerk	Total
Khunchai Nuchpum	(Thailand)	99.73	155	190	345
Joselito Padilla	(Philippines)	115.19	135	165	300
Bayu Apriliawan	(Indonesia)	105.39	151		DNF

=== Women ===
==== 48 Kilogram ====
10 December

Athlete	NOC	Weight (Kg)	Snatch	Clean & Jerk	Total
Pramsiri Bunphithak	(Thailand)	47.84	86	108	194
Ngo Thi Nga	(Vietnam)	47.60	87	98	185
Zaira	(Malaysia)	47.86	70	94	164
Kelle Rojas	(Philippines)	47.11	68	80	148

==== 53 Kilogram ====
11 December

Athlete	NOC	Weight (Kg)	Snatch	Clean & Jerk	Total
Kheuakham	(Laos)	51.17	58	65	123
Raihan	(Malaysia)	52.99	57	63	120
Aye Thanda Lwin	(Myanmar)	52.31	57	62	119
Nguyen Thi Thuy	(Vietnam)	51.61	55	60	115
Aungsumalin Saylert	(Thailand)	52.36	55	60	115

==== 58 Kilogram ====
11 December

Athlete	NOC	Weight (Kg)	Snatch	Clean & Jerk	Total
Raema Lisa Rumbewas	(Indonesia)	56.46	94	116	210
Pimsiri Sirikaew	(Thailand)	57.41	93	115	208
Mailor	(Laos)	53.28	60	77	137

==== 63 Kilogram ====
12 December

Athlete	NOC	Weight (Kg)	Snatch	Clean & Jerk	Total
Okta Dwi Pramita	(Indonesia)	58.17	94	117	211
Thi Thiet Nguyen	(Vietnam)	62.75	94	117	211
Thaw Yae Faw	(Myanmar)	60.92	93	111	204

==== 69 Kilogram ====
12 December

Athlete	NOC	Weight (Kg)	Snatch	Clean & Jerk	Total
Nguyen Thi Phuong	(Vietnam)	67.58	106	120	226
Sinta Darmariani	(Indonesia)	68.62	94	124	218
Yar Thet Pan	(Myanmar)	68.30	95	110	205
Nurul Farhanah	(Malaysia)	68.97	82	95	177
Bao Vang	(Laos)	68.10	75	95	170

==== Above 69 Kilogram ====
13 December

Athlete	NOC	Weight (Kg)	Snatch	Clean & Jerk	Total
Zay Zay Latt	(Myanmar)	75.09	118	143	261
Annipa Moontar	(Thailand)	105.04	117	140	257
Novi Yanti	(Indonesia)	80.72	97	110	207
Angelica Lado	(Philippines)	87.90	75	101	176
Manilat	(Laos)	70.32	60	70	130
Arisha Farra	(Malaysia)	74.75	72		DNF
