= 2011 World Weightlifting Championships – Men's 69 kg =

The men's competition in the lightweight (– 69 kg) division was held on 7–8 November 2011.

== Schedule ==
Date	Time	Event
7 November 2011	11:00	Group D
8 November 2011	09:00	Group C
8 November 2011	13:30	Group B
8 November 2011	19:00	Group A

== Medalists ==
Event	Gold		Silver		Bronze	
Snatch	Mete Binay (TUR)	157 kg	Oleg Chen (RUS)	156 kg	Tang Deshang (CHN)	155 kg
Clean & Jerk	Tang Deshang (CHN)	186 kg	Wu Chao (CHN)	185 kg	Won Jeong-sik (KOR)	182 kg
Total	Tang Deshang (CHN)	341 kg	Oleg Chen (RUS)	336 kg	Wu Chao (CHN)	335 kg

== Records ==
Prior to this competition, the existing world records were as follows.

World Record	Snatch	Georgi Markov (BUL)	165 kg	Sydney, Australia	20 September 2000
World Record	Clean & Jerk	Zhang Guozheng (CHN)	197 kg	Qinhuangdao, China	11 September 2003
World Record	Total	Galabin Boevski (BUL)	357 kg	Athens, Greece	24 November 1999

== Results ==
Rank	Athlete	Group	Body weight	Snatch (kg)				Clean & Jerk (kg)				Total
Rank	Athlete	Group	Body weight	1	2	3	Rank	1	2	3	Rank	Total
1st place, gold medalist(s)	Tang Deshang (CHN)	A	68.63	150	153	155	3rd place, bronze medalist(s)	181	183	186	1st place, gold medalist(s)	341
2nd place, silver medalist(s)	Oleg Chen (RUS)	A	68.66	150	156	~~159~~	2nd place, silver medalist(s)	175	180	~~182~~	5	336
3rd place, bronze medalist(s)	Wu Chao (CHN)	A	68.07	~~148~~	148	150	4	180	183	185	2nd place, silver medalist(s)	335
4	Mete Binay (TUR)	A	68.97	154	157	~~166~~	1st place, gold medalist(s)	173	~~177~~	177	10	334
5	Won Jeong-sik (KOR)	B	68.89	140	144	~~147~~	9	177	182	~~185~~	3rd place, bronze medalist(s)	326
6	Bernardin Matam (FRA)	B	68.57	135	139	141	11	170	175	181	4	322
7	Mohamed Abdelbaki (EGY)	B	68.50	~~140~~	140	144	8	170	175	177	9	321
8	Sajjad Behrouzi (IRI)	A	68.67	140	145	~~150~~	6	176	~~182~~	~~182~~	12	321
9	Afgan Bayramov (AZE)	B	68.33	138	~~142~~	~~142~~	18	173	178	~~181~~	7	316
10	Samvel Grigoryan (ARM)	A	68.83	~~140~~	140	145	7	~~171~~	171	~~178~~	21	316
11	Mohamed Ossama (EGY)	B	68.96	138	~~142~~	~~142~~	21	172	~~178~~	178	8	316
12	Vencelas Dabaya (FRA)	A	68.42	~~138~~	138	~~142~~	19	175	~~180~~	~~180~~	13	313
13	Tolkunbek Hudaýbergenow (TKM)	C	68.58	130	135	138	20	169	175	~~180~~	14	313
14	Mohd Hafifi Mansor (MAS)	D	68.78	133	~~138~~	~~138~~	33	170	175	180	6	313
15	Briken Calja (ALB)	B	68.94	~~140~~	140	~~145~~	15	~~170~~	~~170~~	172	19	312
16	Deni (INA)	B	67.50	~~135~~	135	~~141~~	27	172	176	~~179~~	11	311
17	Ekrem Celil (TUR)	A	67.63	~~138~~	138	~~141~~	17	173	~~177~~	~~177~~	18	311
18	Ravi Kumar Katulu (IND)	B	68.81	~~137~~	137	~~141~~	22	174	~~179~~	~~179~~	16	311
19	Daniel Godelli (ALB)	B	68.89	140	143	146	5	165	—	—	31	311
20	Triyatno (INA)	B	69.00	137	~~141~~	~~141~~	25	170	174	~~177~~	17	311
21	Junior Sánchez (VEN)	C	67.23	135	140	142	10	163	166	168	24	310
22	Kim Myong-hyok (PRK)	B	67.93	~~140~~	140	~~143~~	12	170	~~175~~	~~175~~	23	310
23	Pornchai Lobsi (THA)	C	68.34	135	~~139~~	~~141~~	30	163	167	171	20	306
24	Bakhram Mendibaev (UZB)	C	68.84	135	~~138~~	~~138~~	31	163	167	171	22	306
25	Israel José Rubio (VEN)	C	68.16	135	~~140~~	140	13	~~165~~	~~165~~	165	28	305
26	Alexandru Șpac (MDA)	B	68.85	~~140~~	140	~~143~~	14	~~165~~	~~165~~	165	30	305
27	Edwin Mosquera (COL)	C	68.33	~~135~~	135	139	16	165	~~169~~	~~169~~	29	304
28	Doyler Sánchez (COL)	C	67.86	132	136	~~138~~	26	167	~~171~~	~~171~~	25	303
29	Kim Un-dok (PRK)	C	68.88	~~128~~	128	~~133~~	37	162	175	~~180~~	15	303
30	Bredni Roque (CUB)	D	68.33	130	135	~~137~~	29	~~166~~	166	~~172~~	26	301
31	Enrique Valencia (ECU)	D	67.70	130	~~135~~	135	28	160	165	~~167~~	27	300
32	Antoniu Buci (ROU)	C	68.96	133	137	~~139~~	24	163	~~167~~	~~167~~	33	300
33	Simon Brandhuber (GER)	D	68.94	127	131	134	32	154	158	162	35	296
34	Óscar Valdizón (GUA)	D	69.00	127	131	~~134~~	36	157	162	164	32	295
35	Damian Kuczyński (POL)	C	68.88	132	~~136~~	~~136~~	34	~~158~~	158	162	34	294
36	Tomohiro Asada (JPN)	D	68.11	122	126	~~129~~	38	~~151~~	151	~~156~~	36	277
37	Miroslav Janíček (SVK)	D	68.98	~~120~~	120	~~125~~	42	150	~~156~~	~~156~~	37	270
38	Petr Petrov (CZE)	D	67.33	~~120~~	120	~~124~~	40	149	~~155~~	~~156~~	38	269
39	Dominic Lussier (CAN)	D	68.44	120	~~124~~	~~124~~	41	141	~~146~~	146	39	266
40	Gareth Evans (GBR)	D	67.02	115	120	~~125~~	39	~~145~~	~~145~~	145	41	265
41	Pasam Rambabu (IND)	D	68.66	118	~~122~~	~~122~~	43	146	~~150~~	~~150~~	40	264
42	Mikko Kuusisto (FIN)	D	68.87	114	117	~~120~~	44	144	~~149~~	~~150~~	42	261
43	Neil Dougan (IRL)	D	68.94	100	105	110	45	130	~~136~~	~~136~~	43	240
—	Giorgi Lomtadze (GEO)	C	68.94	134	137	~~139~~	23	~~163~~	~~163~~	~~163~~	—	—
—	Artiom Pipa (MDA)	C	68.58	~~131~~	131	~~135~~	35	—	—	—	—	—
—	Vanik Avetisyan (ARM)	A	68.66	~~138~~	~~138~~	~~138~~	—	—	—	—	—	—
DQ	Sardar Hasanov (AZE)	A	67.96	145	~~150~~	150	—	~~176~~	176	~~181~~	—	—
