= Sibel Özkan =

Turkish weightlifter (born 1988)

Personal information
- Nationality: Turkish
- Born: Özkan; 3 March 1988 (age 38) Afyonkarahisar, Turkey
- Height: 1.55 m (5.1 ft) (2009)
- Weight: 48 kg (106 lb) (2009)

Sport
- Country: Turkey
- Sport: Weightlifting
- Event: 48 kg
Medal record
Olympic Games
| Disqualified | 2008 Beijing | 48 kg |
World Championships
| Gold medal – first place | 2010 Antalya | 48 kg |
| Silver medal – second place | 2009 Goyang | 48 kg |
| Silver medal – second place | 2014 Almaty | 48 kg |
European Championships
| Gold medal – first place | 2015 Tbilisi | 48 kg |
| Gold medal – first place | 2016 Førde | 48 kg |
| Silver medal – second place | 2008 Lignano | 48 kg |
Mediterranean Games
| Silver medal – second place | 2013 Mersin | 48 kg S |
| Silver medal – second place | 2005 Almeria | 48 kg C |

Sibel Özkan (born 3 March 1988, in Afyonkarahisar) is a Turkish weightlifter competing in the Women's 48 kg division. She is 1.55 m (5.1 ft) tall and weighs 48 kg (106 lb). She initially won the silver medal in the 48 kg event at the 2008 Summer Olympics, but in 2016 her result was annulled due to a doping violation upon reanalysis of samples from 2008.

== Personal life ==
She was born on 3 March 1988, to Ramazan and his wife to Kezban in Kozluca village of Afyonkarahisar, Turkey as the youngest of three siblings. As she was three years of age, her parents divorced. Unable to look after her children, the mother placed Sİbel's brother Bülent, at that time four years old, and Özgür, who was five years old, into a children's dormitory in Afyonkarahisar. However, Sibel had to be moved to another city, since the orphanage was only for boys. She was put in a children's home in Konya.

Her mother Kezban Özkan died one year after she placed her children in orphanages. Sibel's brothers joined her in the same orphanage in Konya two years later.

As she was 13 years of age, Sibel shifted to another orphanage in the same city. There, she started to perform sports with judo. However, her interest changed soon to weightlifting despite her brother's opposition. She was trained by Süreyya Horasanlı and Sami Özsu, becoming successful at national and international championships in the 48 kg category. Sibel is member of the weightlifting-specialized sports club of Kuyulusebil Halter İhtisas S.K. in Konya.

After finishing the high school at the age of 18, she attended Gaziosmanpaşa University in Tokat to study physical education and sports, where she is still a student.

In 2009, Sibel married to Ömer Öz, a medal-winning Turkish weightlifter, whom she was engaged to since 2006. The couple separated the same year.

== Achievements and honours ==
After coming fourth in the snatch event at the 2007 World Weightlifting Championships - Women's 48 kg, she won her first Olympics silver medal in the Beijing Summer Olympics on 9 August 2008, held at the Beijing University of Aeronautics and Astronautics Gymnasium coming second to the then winner of the 2007 World Weightlifting Championships - Women's 48 kg Xiexia Chen. Sibel won the silver medal with 111.0 kg in the Clean and Jerk achieving 199.0 kg in total.

Achieving 117.0 kg in the 48 kg Clean and Jerk category at the 2009 World Weightlifting Championships held in Goyang, South Korea, Sibel Özkan became Turkey's first ever female gold medalist in weightlifting at world championships.

== Doping case ==
In 2016, the International Olympic Committee requested the return of the silver medal that she won at the 2008 Summer Olympics in Beijing, China, due to her failing a repeated drug test for using Stanozolol.

== Major results ==
| Year | Venue | Event | Snatch (kg) | Clean & Jerk (kg) | Total (kg) | Rank |
Olympic Games
| 2008 | Beijing, China | −48 kg | ~~88.0~~ | ~~111.0~~ | ~~199.0~~ | DSQ (2nd) |
World Championships
| 2007 | Chiang Mai, Thailand | −48 kg | 84.0 | 108.0 | 192.0 | 4 |
| 2009 | Goyang, South Korea | −48 kg | 89.0 | 117.0 | 206.0 | 2nd place, silver medalist(s) |
| 2010 | Antalya, Turkey | −48 kg | 90.0 | 115.0 | 205.0 | 2nd place, silver medalist(s) |
| 2014 | Almaty, Kazakhstan | −48 kg | 84.0 | 105.0 | 189.0 | 2nd place, silver medalist(s) |
European Championships
| 2005 | Sofia, Bulgaria | −48 kg | 87.5 | 70.0 | 157.5 | 6 |
| 2007 | Strasbourg, France | −48 kg | 78.0 | 87.5 | 165.5 | 4 |
| 2008 | Lignano Sabbiadoro, Italy | −48 kg | 86.0 | 110.0 ERJ | 196.0 ERJ | 2nd place, silver medalist(s) |
| 2015 | Tbilisi, Georgia | −48 kg | 80.0 | 99.0 | 179.0 | 1st place, gold medalist(s) |
| 2016 | Førde, Norway | −48 kg | 82.0 | 100.0 | 182.0 | 1st place, gold medalist(s) |
Mediterranean Games
| 2005 | Almería, Spain | −48 kg | – | – | – | 2nd place, silver medalist(s) |
| 2013 | Mersin, Turkey | −48 kg | 78.0 | 100.0 | – | 2nd place, silver medalist(s) |

ERJ: European Junior Record
