= Mati-ur-Rehman =

Pakistani weightlifter (born 1984)

Mati-ur-Rehman (born 17 September 1984)) is a weightlifter from Pakistan.

== Career ==
=== 2010 ===
Rehman won a silver medal at the 2010 South Asian Games held in Dhaka, Bangladesh.

He participated in the 2010 Commonwealth Games in New Delhi, India where he placed 5th in the 69 kg category.

== Major competitions ==
Year	Venue	Weight	Snatch (kg)				Clean & Jerk (kg)				Total	Rank
Year	Venue	Weight	1	2	3	Rank	1	2	3	Rank	Total	Rank
Commonwealth Games
2010	(Indonesia) Delhi, India	69 kg	120	124	126	—N/a	150	~~155~~	157	—N/a	283	5
