= Thoko Kakhongwe =

Malawian weightlifter

Personal information
- Full name: Thokozani Kakhongwe
- Born: 7 June 1987 (age 39)
- Weight: 67.52 kg (148.9 lb)

Sport
- Country: Malawi
- Sport: Weightlifting
- Weight class: 69 kg
- Team: National team
- Updated on 11 October 2016

Thoko Kakhongwe (born 7 June 1987) is a Malawian male weightlifter, competing in the 69 kg category and representing Malawi at international competitions. He participated at the 2010 Commonwealth Games in the 69 kg event.

== Major competitions ==
Year	Venue	Weight	Snatch (kg)				Clean & Jerk (kg)				Total	Rank
Year	Venue	Weight	1	2	3	Rank	1	2	3	Rank	Total	Rank
Commonwealth Games
2010	Delhi, India	69 kg	105	110	~~115~~	—N/a	120	~~125~~	127	—N/a	237	13
