= Valentin Hristov =

Valentin Hristov may refer to

- Valentin Hristov (weightlifter, born 1956), Bulgarian weightlifter
- Valentin Hristov (weightlifter, born 1994), Azerbaijani and Bulgarian weightlifter
