= Tian Yuan (weightlifter) =

Chinese weightlifter (born 1993)

Medal record

Women's Weightlifting

Representing China

Youth Olympic Games
Gold medal – first place	2010 Singapore	– 48 kg

World Championships
Gold medal – first place	2011 Paris	– 48 kg
Bronze medal – third place	2010 Antalya	– 48 kg

Asian Championships
Gold medal – first place	2011 Tongling	– 48 kg

National Games of China
Gold medal – first place	2013 Liaoning	– 48 kg

Tian Yuan (Chinese: 田源; pinyin: Tián Yuán; born January 29, 1993) is a Chinese weightlifter.
