= Weightlifting at the 2010 Commonwealth Games – Men's 69 kg =

The men's 69 kg weightlifting competition took place on 6 October. The weightlifter from India won the gold, with a combined lift of 321 kg.

== Results ==
Rank	Name	Country	Group	B.weight (kg)	Snatch (kg)	Clean & Jerk (kg)	Total (kg)
1st place, gold medalist(s)	Katulu Ravi Kumar	India	A	68.84	146	175	321
2nd place, silver medalist(s)	Chinthana Vidanage	Sri Lanka	A	68.96	134	174	308
3rd place, bronze medalist(s)	Mohd Mansor	Malaysia	A	68.58	137	169	306
4	Jean Yanou Ketchanke	Cameroon	A	68.82	127	158	285
5	Mati Rehman	Pakistan	A	68.82	126	157	283
6	Mark Spooner	New Zealand	A	68.72	123	157	280
7	Dominic Lussier	Canada	B	68.99	126	151	277
8	Ika Aliklik	Nauru	B	68.01	115	140	255
9	Toafitu Perive	Samoa	B	68.27	107	146	253
10	Halil Zorba	England	B	68.90	105	145	250
11	Takenibeia Toromon	Kiribati	B	68.15	110	135	245
12	Seth Fetrie	Ghana	B	68.97	101	140	241
13	Thokozani Kakhongwe	Malawi	B	67.52	110	127	237
14	Constantine Vasiliades	Cyprus	B	68.61	105	130	235
15	Magarajen Moonien	Mauritius	B	68.96	105	120	225
–	Njuh Venatius	Cameroon	A	68.77	–	–	DNS
–	Francois Etoundi	Australia	A	68.83	129	–	DNF
–	Mohd Talib	Malaysia	A	68.73	131	–	DNF

== See also ==
- 2010 Commonwealth Games
- Weightlifting at the 2010 Commonwealth Games
