= Wu Chao (weightlifter) =

Chinese weightlifter (born 1992)

Medal record

Men's Weightlifting

Representing China

World Weightlifting Championships
Bronze medal – third place	2011 Paris	– 69 kg

Wu Chao (born January 19, 1992) is a Chinese weightlifter.
