= Lilla Berki =

Hungarian weightlifter

Personal information
- Full name: Lilla Berki
- Born: 29 August 1993 (age 32)
- Weight: 46.82 kg (103.2 lb)

Sport
- Country: Hungary
- Sport: Weightlifting
- Team: National team
- Updated on 6 September 2016

Lilla Berki (born 29 August 1993) was a Hungarian weightlifter, competing in the 48 kg category and representing Hungary at international competitions.

She competed at world championships, most recently at the 2010 World Weightlifting Championships.

== Major results ==
Year	Venue	Weight	Snatch (kg)				Clean & Jerk (kg)				Total	Rank
Year	Venue	Weight	1	2	3	Rank	1	2	3	Rank	Total	Rank
World Championships
2010	Antalya, Turkey	48 kg	42	~~45~~	45	28	53	56	~~60~~	29	101	28
