= Magarajen Monien =

Mauritian weightlifter

Personal information
- Full name: Magarajen Monien
- Born: 9 March 1981 (age 45)
- Weight: 68.96 kg (152.0 lb)

Sport
- Country: Mauritius
- Sport: Weightlifting
- Weight class: 69 kg
- Team: National team
- Updated on 11 October 2016

Magarajen Monien (born 9 March 1981) is a Mauritian male weightlifter, competing in the 69 kg category and representing Mauritius at international competitions. He participated at the 2010 Commonwealth Games in the 69 kg event.

== Major competitions ==
Year	Venue	Weight	Snatch (kg)				Clean & Jerk (kg)				Total	Rank
Year	Venue	Weight	1	2	3	Rank	1	2	3	Rank	Total	Rank
Commonwealth Games
2010	Delhi, India	69 kg	~~105~~	105	~~110~~	—N/a	120	~~130~~	~~130~~	—N/a	225	15
