= Zhao Chaojun =

Chinese weightlifter (born 1988)

Medal record

Men's Weightlifting

Representing China

World Weightlifting Championships
Silver medal – second place	2011 Paris	– 56 kg

Zhao Chaojun (born January 15, 1988) is a Chinese male weightlifter.

He won a silver medal in the 2011 World Weightlifting Championships – Men's 56 kg event.
