= Tan Yayun =

Chinese weightlifter (born 1992)

Medal record

Representing China

Women's Weightlifting

World Championships
Gold medal – first place	2013 Wrocław	−48 kg
Gold medal – first place	2014 Almaty	−48 kg

Tan Yayun (谭亚运; born 18 November 1992) is a Chinese weightlifter. She competed at the 2013 World Championships in the Women's 48 kg, winning the gold medal. She also won Gold in the 2014 World Weightlifting Championships in Almaty.
