= Tang Deshang =

Chinese weightlifter (born 1991)

Medal record

Men's Weightlifting

Representing China

World Weightlifting Championships
Gold medal – first place	2011 Paris	– 69 kg

Tang Deshang (born April 2, 1991) is a Chinese weightlifter.
