= Panida Khamsri =

Thai weightlifter (born 1989)

Personal information
- Born: January 13, 1989 (age 37) Surin, Thailand
- Height: 1.48 m (4 ft 10 1/2 in)
- Weight: 58 kg (128 lb)

Sport
- Country: Thailand
- Sport: Weightlifting
- Event: 48kg
Medal record
Women's Weightlifting
Representing Thailand
World Championships
Silver medal – second place	2011 Paris	– 48 kg
Bronze medal – third place	2014 Almaty	48 kg
Asian Championships
Bronze medal – third place	2015 Phuket	48 kg

Panida Khamsri (Thai: พนิดา คำศรี; born January 13, 1989) is a Thai weightlifter.

== Results ==
Year	Event	Location	Body weight	Snatch (kg)				Clean & Jerk (kg)				Total	Rank
Year	Event	Location	Body weight	1	2	3	Rank	1	2	3	Rank	Total	Rank
2012	Summer Olympics Women -48 kg	London, United Kingdom	47.45	~~81~~	~~81~~	~~81~~	Did not finish						
2012	Asian Championships Women -48 kg	Pyeongtaek, South Korea	47.98	~~84~~	~~84~~	~~84~~	DNF	102	104	~~109~~	2nd place, silver medalist(s)	DNF	
2011	World Championships Women -48 kg	Paris, France	47.59	~~80~~	80	~~85~~	6	103	104	107	2nd place, silver medalist(s)	187	2nd place, silver medalist(s)
2010	World Championships Women -48 kg	Antalya, Turkey	47.20	~~74~~	74	~~78~~	14	100	~~104~~	~~104~~	6	174	9
2010	Junior Asian Championships Women -48 kg	Dubai, UAE	47.20	73	77	~~81~~	1st place, gold medalist(s)	96	101	~~104~~	2nd place, silver medalist(s)	178	2nd place, silver medalist(s)
2009	World Championships Women -48 kg	Goyang, South Korea	46.89	~~75~~	75	~~80~~	9	~~95~~	95	100	7	175	9
2009	Junior World Championships Women -48 kg	Bucharest, Romania	47.08	75	~~78~~	78	1st place, gold medalist(s)	96	99	-	1st place, gold medalist(s)	177	1st place, gold medalist(s)
2008	Junior World Championships Women -48 kg	Cali, Colombia	46.50	72	74	76	3rd place, bronze medalist(s)	95	101	~~104~~	2nd place, silver medalist(s)	177	2nd place, silver medalist(s)
