= Nurdan Karagöz =

Turkish weightlifter (born 1987)

Personal information
- Nationality: Turkish
- Born: January 25, 1987 (age 39)
- Height: 1.5 m (4 ft 11 in)
- Weight: 48 kg (106 lb)

Sport
- Country: Turkey
- Sport: Weightlifting
- Event: –48 kg
Medal record
World Championships
| Bronze medal – third place | 2011 Paris | – 48 kg |
European Championships
| Silver medal – second place | 2011 Kazan | – 48 kg |
| Silver medal – second place | 2012 Antalya | – 48 kg |

Nurdan Karagöz (born January 25, 1987, Bolu) is a Turkish weightlifter competing in the – 48 kg division.

She won the silver medal at the 2011 European Weightlifting Championships held in Kazan, Russia lifting for bronze medal in the Snatch category and the silver medal for the Clean&Jerk discipline. At the 2012 European Championships held in Antalya, Turkey, she became silver medalist.

Karagöz represented her country at the 2012 Summer Olympics and ranked 5th.

== Achievements ==
| Rank | | | Competition | Host | Result |
| S | C | T | Competition | Host | Result |
|---|---|---|---|---|---|
| Bronze medal | Silver medal | Silver medal | 2011 European Championships | (Russia) Kazan | 80+100=180 |
| 4 | Bronze medal | Bronze medal | 2011 World Championships | (France) Paris | 80+103=183 |
| 5 | Silver medal | Silver medal | 2012 European Championships | (Turkey) Antalya | 77+100=177 |
| 3 | 5 | 5 | 2012 Summer Olympics | (United Kingdom) London | 83+103=187 |
