= Pramsiri Bunphithak =

Thai weightlifter (born 1984)

Personal information
- Nationality: Thailand
- Born: 13 January 1984 (age 42) Suphan Buri Province, Thailand
- Height: 1.49 m (4 ft 10 1/2 in)
- Weight: 48 kg (106 lb)

Sport
- Sport: Weightlifting
- Event: 48 kg
- Club: Tavorn Farm
Medal record
Women's weightlifting
Representing Thailand
Southeast Asian Games
Gold medal – first place	2009 Vientiane	48 kg
World Championships
Silver medal – second place	2007 Chiang Mai	48 kg

Pramsiri Bunphithak (Thai: เปรมศิริ บุญพิทักษ์; born January 13, 1984, in Suphan Buri Province) is a Thai weightlifter. She won the gold medal for the 48 kg class at the 2009 Southeast Asian Games in Vientiane, Laos, and silver at the 2007 World Weightlifting Championships in Chiang Mai, Thailand, with a total of 194 and 196 kg, respectively.

Bunphithak represented Thailand at the 2008 Summer Olympics in Beijing, where she competed for the women's flyweight category (48 kg), along with her teammate Pensiri Laosirikul. Bunphithak, however, did not finish the event, after failing to lift a single-motion snatch of 84 kg in three attempts.
