= Maciej Przepiórkiewicz =

Polish weightlifter

Personal information
- Born: November 14, 1987 (age 38)

Sport
- Country: Poland
- Sport: Weightlifter

Maciej Przepiórkiewicz (born November 14, 1987) is a Polish weightlifter in the 56 kg weight division.

He finished 11th at the 2011 European Weightlifting Championships, with a total of 240 kg. He also finished 7th at the 2012 European Weightlifting Championships.
