= Sandow Nasution =

Indonesian weightlifter (born 1981)

Personal information
- Full name: Sandow Weldemar Nasution
- Born: 25 March 1981 (age 45) Jakarta, Indonesia
- Height: 168 cm (5 ft 6 in)
- Weight: 77 kg (170 lb)
Medal record
Men's weightlifting
Representing Indonesia
Asian Championships
Silver medal – second place	2007 Tai'an	77 kg
Southeast Asian Games
Gold medal – first place	2005 Manila	85 kg
Gold medal – first place	2007 Nakhon Ratchasima	77 kg

Sandow Weldemar Nasution (born 25 March 1981) is an Indonesian weightlifter.

He won gold in the 85 kg category at the 2005 Southeast Asian Games. At the 2007 Southeast Asian Games he won gold in the 77 kg category.

He won overall silver in the 77 kg category at the 2007 Asian Championships, with a total of 328 kg.

At the 2007 World Championships he ranked 17th in the 77 kg category, with a total of 331 kg.

He competed in Weightlifting at the 2008 Summer Olympics in the 77 kg division finishing eleventh with 347 kg. This beat his previous personal best by 6 kg.

He is 5 ft 6 inches tall and weighs 170 lb.
