= Pensiri Laosirikul =

Thai weightlifter (born 1984)

Medal record

Women's Weightlifting

Olympic Games
Bronze medal – third place	2008 Beijing	– 48 kg

World Championships
Bronze medal – third place	2007 Chiang Mai	–48 kg

Asian Championships
Bronze medal – third place	2007 Tai'an	–48 kg

Universiade
Bronze medal – third place	2011 Shenzhen	–48 kg

Pensiri Laosirikul (Thai: เพ็ญศิริ เหล่าศิริกุล, born January 17, 1984, in Nakhon Si Thammarat) is a Thai weightlifting athlete, and is of Chinese descent.

She is 4 ft 9 in (145 cm) tall and weighs 47.67 kg.

She competed in the 2008 Olympic Games, in Beijing, winning a bronze medal.

At the 2007 World Championships in Chiang Mai, she took 2nd place in the clean and jerk (112 kg), 3rd place overall (195 kg) and 7th place in the snatch (83 kg).

At the Asian Championships, she took 3rd place overall (191 kg) and in the clean and jerk (110 kg), and 4th place for the snatch (81 kg). The competition was held in Tai'an (China).

At the 2008 Summer Olympics in Beijing, she lifted 85 kg in the snatch and 110 kg in the clean and jerk, resulting in a total of 195 kg.
