= Nguyễn Thị Thiết =

Vietnamese weightlifter

Personal information
- Nationality: Vietnam
- Born: 27 October 1984 (age 41) Hải Dương, Vietnam
- Height: 1.65 m (5 ft 5 in)
- Weight: 63 kg (139 lb)

Sport
- Sport: Weightlifting
- Event: 63 kg
Medal record
Women's weightlifting
Representing Vietnam
Southeast Asian Games
Gold medal – first place	2007 Bangkok	63 kg
Silver medal – second place	2003 Hanoi	63 kg
Silver medal – second place	2005 Manila	63 kg
Silver medal – second place	2009 Vientiane	63 kg

Nguyễn Thị Thiết (born October 27, 1984) is a Vietnamese weightlifter. She won a total of four medals (one gold and three silver) for the 63 kg class at the Southeast Asian Games (2003 in Hanoi, Vietnam, 2005 in Manila, Philippines, 2007 in Bangkok, Thailand, and 2009 in Vientiane, Laos).

Nguyen made her official debut for the 2004 Summer Olympics in Athens, where she competed for the women's middleweight class (63 kg). She finished only in sixth place by ten kilograms short of her record from South Korea's Kim Soo-Kyung, with a total of 205.0 kilograms (95 in the snatch, and 110 in the clean and jerk).

At the 2008 Summer Olympics in Beijing, Nguyen qualified for the second time in the women's 63 kg class, after finishing second from the Asian Weightlifting Championships in Kanazawa, Japan. Nguyen placed fifth in this event, as she successfully lifted 100 kg in the single-motion snatch, and hoisted 125 kg in the two-part, shoulder-to-overhead clean and jerk, for a total of 225 kg.
