= 2011 World Weightlifting Championships =

International weightlifting competition

2011 World Championships
- Host city: Paris, France
- Dates: 5–13 November
- Main venue: Disneyland Paris

The 2011 World Weightlifting Championships were held at Disneyland Paris in Paris, France. The event took place from November 5 to 13, 2011.

== Medal summary ==
=== Men ===
Event	Gold		Silver		Bronze	
56 kg
Snatch	Wu Jingbiao; China	133 kg	Zhao Chaojun; China	128 kg	Trần Lê Quốc Toàn; Vietnam	125 kg
Clean & Jerk	Wu Jingbiao; China	159 kg	Zhao Chaojun; China	156 kg	Valentin Hristov; Azerbaijan	154 kg
Total	Wu Jingbiao; China	292 kg	Zhao Chaojun; China	284 kg	Valentin Hristov; Azerbaijan	276 kg
62 kg
Snatch	Kim Un-guk; North Korea	150 kg	Zhang Jie; China	145 kg	Bünyamin Sezer; Turkey	141 kg
Clean & Jerk	Zhang Jie; China	176 kg	Eko Yuli Irawan; Indonesia	171 kg	Kim Un-guk; North Korea	170 kg
Total	Zhang Jie; China	321 kg	Kim Un-guk; North Korea	320 kg	Eko Yuli Irawan; Indonesia	310 kg
69 kg
Snatch	Mete Binay; Turkey	157 kg	Oleg Chen; Russia	156 kg	Tang Deshang; China	155 kg
Clean & Jerk	Tang Deshang; China	186 kg	Wu Chao; China	185 kg	Won Jeong-sik; South Korea	182 kg
Total	Tang Deshang; China	341 kg	Oleg Chen; Russia	336 kg	Wu Chao; China	335 kg
77 kg
Snatch	Lü Xiaojun; China	170 kg	Su Dajin; China	166 kg	Tigran Martirosyan; Armenia	166 kg
Clean & Jerk	Su Dajin; China	206 kg	Lü Xiaojun; China	205 kg	Sa Jae-hyouk; South Korea	203 kg
Total	Lü Xiaojun; China	375 kg	Su Dajin; China	372 kg	Sa Jae-hyouk; South Korea	360 kg
85 kg
Snatch	Andrei Rybakou; Belarus	178 kg	Adrian Zieliński; Poland	174 kg	Kianoush Rostami; Iran	173 kg
Clean & Jerk	Kianoush Rostami; Iran	209 kg	Benjamin Hennequin; France	208 kg	Yoelmis Hernández; Cuba	205 kg
Total	Kianoush Rostami; Iran	382 kg	Benjamin Hennequin; France	378 kg	Adrian Zieliński; Poland	376 kg
94 kg
Snatch	Aleksandr Ivanov; Russia	186 kg	Artem Ivanov; Ukraine	186 kg	Kim Min-jae; South Korea	182 kg
Clean & Jerk	Ilya Ilyin; Kazakhstan	226 kg	Ruslan Nurudinov; Uzbekistan	221 kg	Saeid Mohammadpour; Iran	221 kg
Total	Ilya Ilyin; Kazakhstan	407 kg	Artem Ivanov; Ukraine	407 kg	Saeid Mohammadpour; Iran	402 kg
105 kg
Snatch	Khadzhimurat Akkaev; Russia	198 kg	Dmitry Klokov; Russia	196 kg	Gia Machavariani; Georgia	187 kg
Clean & Jerk	Khadzhimurat Akkaev; Russia	232 kg	Dmitry Klokov; Russia	232 kg	Oleksiy Torokhtiy; Ukraine	229 kg
Total	Khadzhimurat Akkaev; Russia	430 kg	Dmitry Klokov; Russia	428 kg	Oleksiy Torokhtiy; Ukraine	410 kg
+105 kg
Snatch	Behdad Salimi; Iran	214 kg WR	Ihor Shymechko; Ukraine	200 kg	Sajjad Anoushiravani; Iran	198 kg
Clean & Jerk	Behdad Salimi; Iran	250 kg	Sajjad Anoushiravani; Iran	241 kg	Jeon Sang-guen; South Korea	241 kg
Total	Behdad Salimi; Iran	464 kg	Sajjad Anoushiravani; Iran	439 kg	Jeon Sang-guen; South Korea	433 kg

=== Women ===
Event	Gold		Silver		Bronze	
48 kg
Snatch	Tian Yuan; China	90 kg	Genny Pagliaro; Italy	83 kg	Marzena Karpińska; Poland	82 kg
Clean & Jerk	Tian Yuan; China	117 kg	Panida Khamsri; Thailand	107 kg	Nurdan Karagöz; Turkey	103 kg
Total	Tian Yuan; China	207 kg	Panida Khamsri; Thailand	187 kg	Nurdan Karagöz; Turkey	183 kg
53 kg
Snatch	Zulfiya Chinshanlo; Kazakhstan	97 kg	Yuderqui Contreras; Dominican Republic	95 kg	Hsu Shu-ching; Chinese Taipei	93 kg
Clean & Jerk	Zulfiya Chinshanlo; Kazakhstan	130 kg WR	Aylin Daşdelen; Turkey	126 kg	Ji Jing; China	121 kg
Total	Zulfiya Chinshanlo; Kazakhstan	227 kg	Aylin Daşdelen; Turkey	219 kg	Ji Jing; China	214 kg
58 kg
Snatch	Li Xueying; China	103 kg	Nastassia Novikava; Belarus	101 kg	Romela Begaj; Albania	100 kg
Clean & Jerk	Nastassia Novikava; Belarus	136 kg	Li Xueying; China	133 kg	Pimsiri Sirikaew; Thailand	131 kg
Total	Nastassia Novikava; Belarus	237 kg	Li Xueying; China	236 kg	Pimsiri Sirikaew; Thailand	230 kg
63 kg
Snatch	Svetlana Tsarukaeva; Russia	117 kg WR	Ouyang Xiaofang; China	113 kg	Maiya Maneza; Kazakhstan	109 kg
Clean & Jerk	Maiya Maneza; Kazakhstan	139 kg	Svetlana Tsarukaeva; Russia	138 kg	Roxana Cocoș; Romania	136 kg
Total	Svetlana Tsarukaeva; Russia	255 kg	Maiya Maneza; Kazakhstan	248 kg	Ouyang Xiaofang; China	246 kg
69 kg
Snatch	Oxana Slivenko; Russia	118 kg	Xiang Yanmei; China	116 kg	Huang Shih-hsu; Chinese Taipei	116 kg
Clean & Jerk	Oxana Slivenko; Russia	148 kg	Xiang Yanmei; China	148 kg	Tatiana Matveeva; Russia	143 kg
Total	Oxana Slivenko; Russia	266 kg	Xiang Yanmei; China	264 kg	Tatiana Matveeva; Russia	253 kg
75 kg
Snatch	Svetlana Podobedova; Kazakhstan	131 kg	Nadezhda Evstyukhina; Russia	130 kg	Iryna Kulesha; Belarus	121 kg
Clean & Jerk	Nadezhda Evstyukhina; Russia	163 kg WR	Svetlana Podobedova; Kazakhstan	156 kg	Kim Un-ju; North Korea	151 kg
Total	Nadezhda Evstyukhina; Russia	293 kg	Svetlana Podobedova; Kazakhstan	287 kg	Kim Un-ju; North Korea	265 kg
+75 kg
Snatch	Tatiana Kashirina; Russia	147 kg WR	Zhou Lulu; China	146 kg	Yuliya Dovhal; Azerbaijan	118 kg
Clean & Jerk	Zhou Lulu; China	182 kg	Tatiana Kashirina; Russia	175 kg	Mariam Usman; Nigeria	156 kg
Total	Zhou Lulu; China	328 kg WR	Tatiana Kashirina; Russia	322 kg	Mariam Usman; Nigeria	273 kg

== Medal table ==
Ranking by Big (Total result) medals

Rank	Nation	Gold	Silver	Bronze	Total
1	China	6	4	3	13
2	Russia	4	3	1	8
3	Kazakhstan	2	2	0	4
4	Iran	2	1	1	4
5	Belarus	1	0	0	1
6	North Korea	0	1	1	2
6	Thailand	0	1	1	2
6	Turkey	0	1	1	2
6	Ukraine	0	1	1	2
10	France	0	1	0	1
11	South Korea	0	0	2	2
12	Azerbaijan	0	0	1	1
12	Indonesia	0	0	1	1
12	Nigeria	0	0	1	1
12	Poland	0	0	1	1
Totals (15 entries)		15	15	15	45

Ranking by all medals: Big (Total result) and Small (Snatch and Clean & Jerk)

Rank	Nation	Gold	Silver	Bronze	Total
1	China	16	15	5	36
2	Russia	12	9	2	23
3	Kazakhstan	7	3	1	11
4	Iran	5	2	4	11
5	Belarus	3	1	1	5
6	Turkey	1	2	3	6
7	North Korea	1	1	3	5
8	Ukraine	0	3	2	5
9	Thailand	0	2	2	4
10	France	0	2	0	2
11	Poland	0	1	2	3
12	Indonesia	0	1	1	2
13	Dominican Republic	0	1	0	1
13	Italy	0	1	0	1
13	Uzbekistan	0	1	0	1
16	South Korea	0	0	6	6
17	Azerbaijan	0	0	3	3
18	Chinese Taipei	0	0	2	2
18	Nigeria	0	0	2	2
20	Albania	0	0	1	1
20	Armenia	0	0	1	1
20	Cuba	0	0	1	1
20	Georgia	0	0	1	1
20	Romania	0	0	1	1
20	Vietnam	0	0	1	1
Totals (25 entries)		45	45	45	135

== Team ranking ==
=== Men ===
Rank	Team	Points
1	China	569
2	Iran	500
3	Russia	479
4	South Korea	422
5	Ukraine	350
6	Poland	284

=== Women ===
Rank	Team	Points
1	China	510
2	Russia	509
3	Kazakhstan	444
4	Belarus	298
5	Thailand	294
6	Turkey	280

== Participating nations ==
519 competitors from 87 nations participated. Due to not submitting their whereabouts information according to the IWF Anti-Doping Policy Bulgaria, Cyprus, Saudi Arabia, Oman, Qatar, Sierra Leone and Sri Lanka were not allowed to participate in this year's edition.

- Albania (10)
- American Samoa (1)
- Armenia (10)
- Australia (7)
- Azerbaijan (10)
- Belarus (11)
- Belgium (1)
- Bosnia and Herzegovina (1)
- Brazil (9)
- Cameroon (2)
- Canada (14)
- Chile (1)
- China (15)
- Chinese Taipei (10)
- Colombia (10)
- Costa Rica (1)
- Croatia (2)
- Cuba (6)
- Czech Republic (2)
- Denmark (1)
- Dominican Republic (4)
- Ecuador (10)
- Egypt (10)
- El Salvador (3)
- Micronesia (1)
- Fiji (2)
- Finland (7)
- France (12)
- Georgia (6)
- Germany (12)
- Great Britain (8)
- Greece (6)
- Guatemala (2)
- Hong Kong (1)
- Hungary (7)
- India (14)
- Indonesia (10)
- Iran (8)
- Ireland (2)
- Israel (1)
- Italy (8)
- Japan (15)
- Kazakhstan (14)
- Kiribati (1)
- Kyrgyzstan (2)
- Latvia (2)
- Lithuania (6)
- Macau (2)
- Malaysia (3)
- Mexico (7)
- Moldova (9)
- Mongolia (2)
- Nauru (2)
- New Zealand (1)
- Nigeria (8)
- Niue (1)
- North Korea (11)
- Norway (1)
- Pakistan (1)
- Palau (1)
- Papua New Guinea (1)
- Peru (2)
- Philippines (2)
- Poland (15)
- Puerto Rico (2)
- Romania (7)
- Russia (15)
- Samoa (4)
- Serbia (1)
- Seychelles (1)
- Slovakia (7)
- Solomon Islands (2)
- South Korea (11)
- Spain (10)
- Sweden (4)
- Switzerland (2)
- Tajikistan (1)
- Thailand (11)
- Tunisia (4)
- Turkey (12)
- Turkmenistan (8)
- Tuvalu (1)
- Ukraine (13)
- United States (14)
- Uzbekistan (8)
- Venezuela (11)
- Vietnam (3)

== Aftermath ==
Ukrainian female weightlifter Olha Korobka failed a drugs test after the tournament and was disqualified from the bronze-medal position in the over 75 kg category.
