= Ngangbam Shantikumar Meetei =

Indian-Taiwanese bodybuilder

Ngangbam Shantikumar Meetei (born 1964 or 1965), also known as Chen Jung-sheng (Chinese: 陳榮生), is a natural bodybuilding athlete as well as a Professor from Manipur who is a citizen of Taiwan. He is Mr. Asia champion as well as multiple INBA PNBA World champion, which includes Mr. Asia, World Cup, Natural Universe and Natural Olympia. He is the first Asian who won Professional Natural Olympia titles in bodybuilding.

== Early life ==
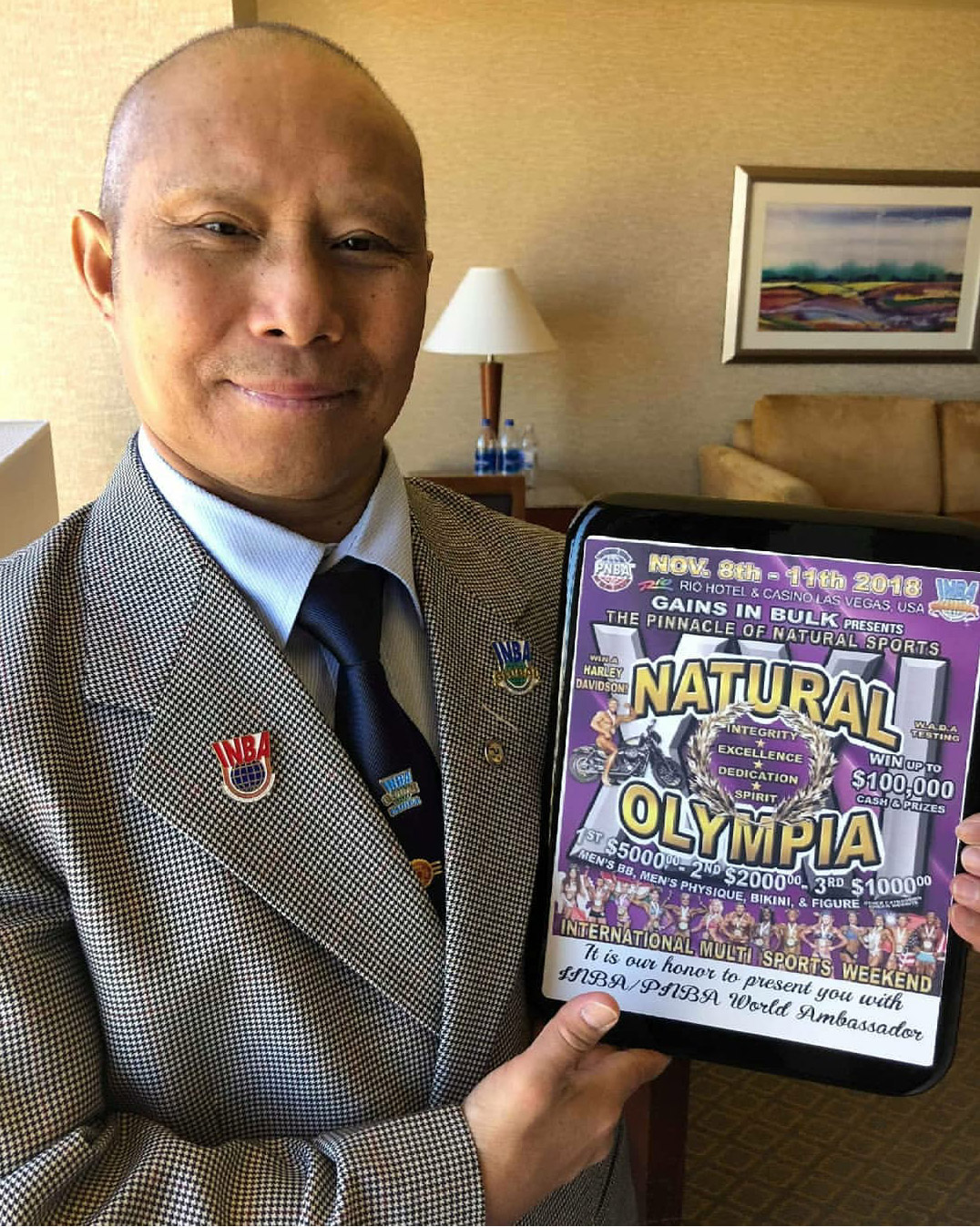
NBA PNBA WORLD AMBASSADOR Award - 2018 Natural Olympia, Las Vegas, The USA

Ngangbam Shantikumar Meetei was born in Uripok Bachaspati Leikai, a locality in the capital of Imphal in Manipur, India.He is the youngest among the 10 children of Ngangbam Shellumgba Meetei and Ngangbam Angoubi Leima. Because of poverty and illiteracy as tenants, they moved from place to place looking jobs to feed the family full of children. Finally, they landed at Luwangsangbam and then to Kanglatongbi where Dr Shantikumar grew up and lived until 12 years old.

== Education ==
He completed matriculation from the Tera Rural Institute at Tera Sapam Leirak, Manipur. After completing a B.A. from DM College, Imphal, Manipur in 1989, he enrolled at the Jawaharlal Nehru University in New Delhi and completed his Masters and one year M. Phil and Ph.D in Linguistics in 1998.

== Bodybuilding career ==
He was crowned Mr World 2013 at Zakynthos, Greece, on 7 July 2013. Shantikumar won the gold medal in 40 to 49 age group and the silver medal in Open Men's Short class. He represented both Manipur and Taiwan in the Natural Olympia 2014.

== Personal life ==
Shantikumar became a citizen of Taiwan in 2012. He is working as an English Professor at De Lin Institute of Technology, Taipei. He is the President of INBA Asia and INBA Taiwan. Shantikumar married Ng. Chen Nan Tai, from Taiwan, in December 1996. They have four children. His wife is an English teacher at Global Educational Institute in Taipei.

He published his own autobiography in 2014, titled My Journey: A Landless Peasant's Son on the Top of the World.
