= Samvel Grigoryan =

Soviet-Armenian poet (1907–1987)

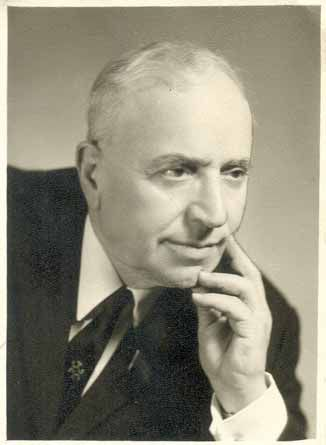
- Samvel Grigoryan
- Born: April 20, 1907; Shushikend, Nagorno-Karabakh
- Died: June 7, 1987 (aged 80); Baku, Soviet Azerbaijan
- Known for: Member of the Supreme Council of the Azerbaijan SSR (1959-1985)
- Awards: Honored Worker of Culture of Azerbaijan SSR (1970) People's Poet of Azerbaijan SSR (1984) Order of the Red Banner (1967)

Samvel Avanesovich Grigoryan (Armenian: Սամվել Գրիգորյան; April 20, 1907 in Shushikend, Nagorno-Karabakh – June 7, 1987) was a Soviet Armenian poet and translator.

== Life ==
Samvel Grigoryan was born to family of blacksmiths. In 1926 he joined the History and Literature Department of the Yerevan University, graduating in 1929, began his literary activities in 1925. Honored Worker of Culture of Azerbaijan SSR (1970). People's Poet of Azerbaijan SSR (1984). Member of the Supreme Council of the Azerbaijan SSR (1959-1985). He was awarded the Order of the Red Banner on April 27, 1967.
