= Ewa Mizdal =

Polish weightlifter (born 1987)

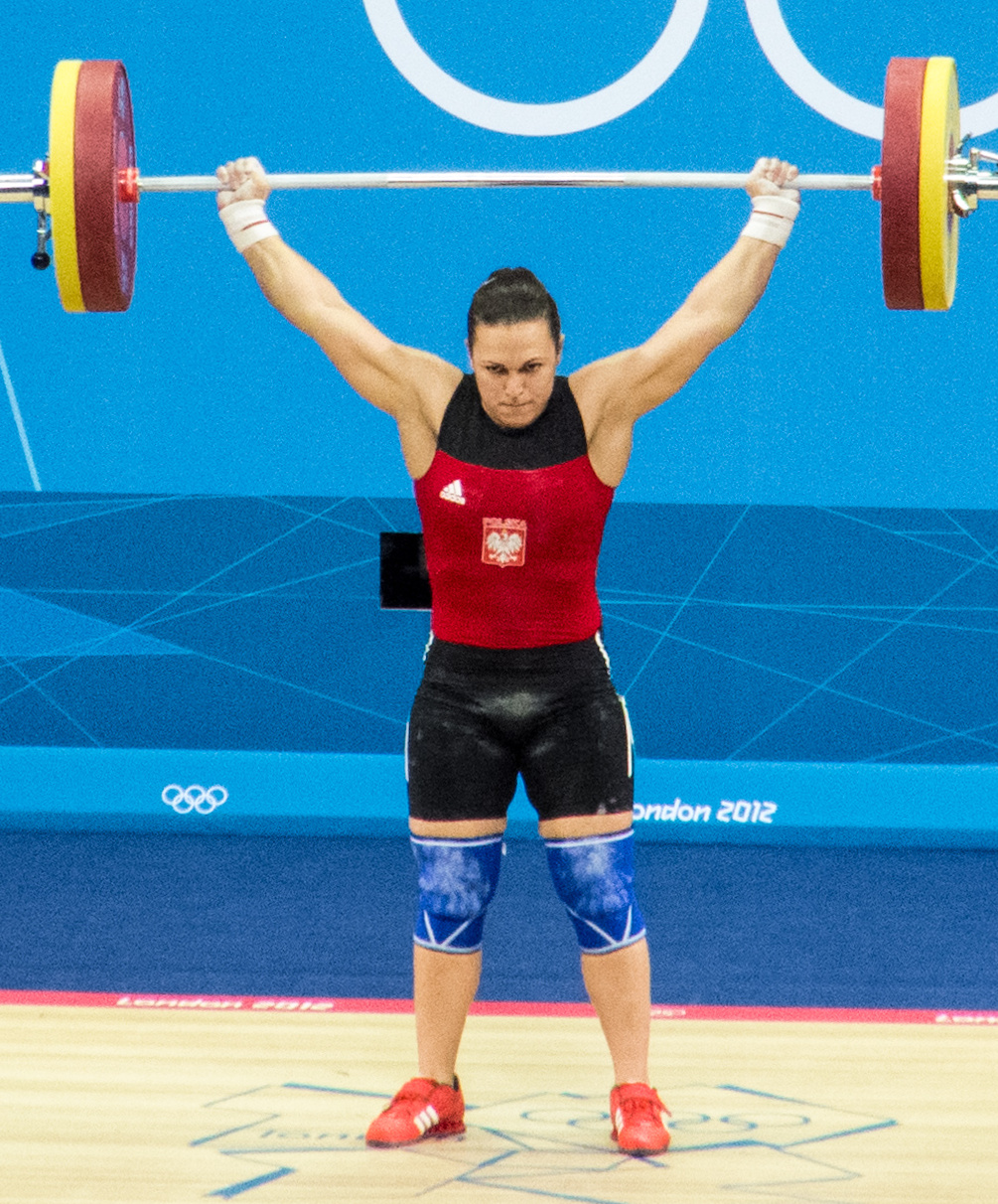
- Ewa Mizdal in 2012

Personal information
- Born: 18 July 1987 (age 37); Lublin, Poland
- Height: 160 cm (5 ft 3 in)
- Weight: 74 kg (163 lb)

Sport
- Country: Poland
- Sport: Weightlifting
- Event: 75kg
- Coached by: Antoni Czerniak

Ewa Mizdal (born 18 July 1987 in Lublin) is a Polish weightlifter.

She represented Poland at the 2012 Summer Olympics, in the event Weightlifting Women's 75 kg. She was ranked 7th with a total of 231 kg. She advanced to 4th place after disqualification of some other competitors due to doping violations.
