= Ryang Chun-hwa =

North Korean weightlifter (born 1991)

Medal record

Women's weightlifting

Representing North Korea

Olympic Games
Bronze medal – third place	2012 London	−48 kg

World Championships
Silver medal – second place	2013 Wrocław	−48 kg

Asian Championships
Gold medal – first place	2013 Astana	−48 kg

- Ryang Chun-hwa
- Hangul: 량춘화
- RR: Ryang Chunhwa
- MR: Ryang Ch'unhwa

Ryang Chun-hwa (Korean: 량춘화; Korean pronunciation: [ɾjaŋ.tsʰun.ɦwa]; born 12 June 1991 in Pyongyang) is a North Korean weightlifter. She competed at the 2012 Summer Olympics in the Women's 48 kg, winning the bronze medal. Ryang represents the April 25 Sports Team. She won the silver medal at the 2011 Summer Universiade.

== Major results ==
Year	Venue	Weight	Snatch (kg)				Clean & Jerk (kg)				Total	Rank
Year	Venue	Weight	1	2	3	Rank	1	2	3	Rank	Total	Rank
Summer Universiade
2011	Shenzhen, China	48 kg	80	~~83~~	~~83~~	3rd place, bronze medalist(s)	102	106	~~108~~	2nd place, silver medalist(s)	186	2nd place, silver medalist(s)
