= Carolina Valencia =

Mexican weightlifter (born 1985)

Personal information
- Full name: Carolina Valencia Hernández
- Born: February 8, 1985 (age 41) Chetumal, Quintana Roo, Mexico
Medal record
Women's weightlifting
Representing Mexico
World Championships
| Disqualified | 2013 Wrocław | −48 kg |
Pan American Games
| Gold medal – first place | 2007 Rio de Janeiro | −48 kg |
Pan American Championships
| Gold medal – first place | 2010 Guatemala City | −48 kg |
Central American and Caribbean Games
| Gold medal – first place | 2006 Cartagena | −48 kg |

Carolina Valencia Hernández (born February 8, 1985, in Chetumal, Quintana Roo, Mexico) is a female weightlifter from Mexico. She won the gold medal at the 2007 Pan American Games for her native North American country in the − 48 kg weight division.
