= Honami Mizuochi =

Japanese weightlifter

Honami Mizuochi (水落 穂南, Mizuochi Honami; born 5 February 1993) is a Japanese weightlifter. She competed at the 2012 Summer Olympics in the Women's 48 kg, finishing in 6th place.
