= Ngangbam Soniya Chanu =

Indian weightlifter (born 1980)

Personal information
- Born: 15 February 1980 (age 45)
- Weight: 48 kg (106 lb)

Sport
- Country: India
- Sport: Weightlifting
- Event: 48kg
- Coached by: Hansa Sharma
- Updated on 25 July 2012

Ngangbam Soniya Chanu (born 15 February 1980) is an Indian Woman Weightlifter. She won the silver medal in the Women's 48 kg category at the 2010 Commonwealth Games.

She is from Imphal West district of Manipur state of India.

== 2012 Summer Olympics ==
She represented India, in 2012 Summer Olympics in Women's 48 kg. She finished with 7th position.
