= Mélanie Bardis =

French weightlifter

Mélanie Marie Anna Noël-Bardis (born 13 May 1986 in Ambilly, France) is a French weightlifter. At the 2008 Summer Olympics, she competed in the women's 48 kg event, finishing in 7th place with a total of 177 kg. She competed at the 2012 Summer Olympics, also in the Women's 48 kg event, finishing in 10th place with a total of 166 kg.
