= Chen Xiexia =

Chinese weightlifter (born 1983)

Personal information
- Born: January 8, 1983 (age 43)
- Height: 1.52 m (5 ft 0 in)
- Weight: 49 kg (108 lb)

Sport
- Country: China
- Sport: Weightlifting

Chen Xiexia (Chinese: 陈燮霞; pinyin: Chén Xièxiá; born January 8, 1983, in Panyu, Guangzhou, Guangdong) is a Chinese weightlifter.

== Career ==
She won three golds at the 2007 World Weightlifting Championships. and the first gold medal for China in the 2008 Summer Olympics in the 48 kg class, setting an Olympic Record by lifting a total of 212 kg.

She also won 3 golds at the 2007 Asian Championships, with a world record of 120 kg in clean and jerk. At the Beijing University of Aeronautics and Astronautics Gymnasium on Day 1 of the Olympic Games, 152 cm Xiexia, 25, yelled "jia you!" (come on!), and succeeded on all six attempts (snatch: 95 kg; clean and jerk: 117 kg).

On 12 January 2017 it was announced that because of a doping violation she had been disqualified from the 2008 Olympic Games, and was stripped of her gold medal. Chen Wei-Ling of Chinese Taipei, originally the bronze medalist, was awarded the gold medal instead.
