= Marzena Karpińska =

Polish weightlifter (born 1988)

Personal information
- Born: 19 February 1988 (age 38) Biłgoraj, Poland
Medal record
Women's Weightlifting
Representing Poland
European Championships
Gold medal – first place	2012 Antalya	–48 kg
Silver medal – second place	2010 Minsk	– 48 kg
Silver medal – second place	2014 Tel Aviv	– 48 kg
Bronze medal – third place	2009 Bucharest	– 48 kg

Marzena Karpińska (Polish pronunciation: [maˈʐɛna kar'piɲska]; born 19 February 1988, in Biłgoraj) is a Polish weightlifter. She won a gold medal at the 2012 European Championships in Antalya, Turkey with a 187 kg total. She weighed in at 47.74 kg and had snatch lifts of 81, 83 and 85 kg and clean and jerk lifts of 98, 100 and 102 kg. She was also a silver medalist at the 2010 European Championships and bronze medalist at the 2009 European Championships in the 48 kg category.

At the 2008 Summer Olympics in Beijing, Karpińska placed 9th in the 48 kg category, with a total of 171 kg. She did not compete in the 2012 Summer Olympics in London due to doping allegations.
