= Beach volleyball at the 2015 Pacific Games =

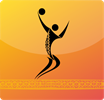
- Beach volleyball for the Games
- Venue: Sir John Guise sports precinct (outdoor), Port Moresby
- Dates: 13–18 July
- Competitors: 56 from 16 nations

Beach volleyball at the 2015 Pacific Games in Port Moresby, Papua New Guinea was held on July 13–18, 2015.

== Nations participating ==
A total of 16 countries participated in beach volleyball at the 2015 Pacific Games.

- American Samoa (4)
- Cook Islands (2)
- Fiji (4)
- Guam (4)
- Kiribati (2)
- Marshall Islands (2)
- New Caledonia (4)
- Northern Mariana Islands (4)
- Palau (2)
- Papua New Guinea (Host) (4)
- Samoa (4)
- Solomon Islands (4)
- (French Polynesia) Tahiti (4)
- Tonga (4)
- Tuvalu (4)
- Vanuatu (4)

== Medal summary ==
=== Medal table ===
* Host nation (Papua New Guinea)

Rank	Nation	Gold	Silver	Bronze	Total
1	American Samoa	1	0	1	2
2	Papua New Guinea*	1	0	0	1
3	Fiji	0	1	0	1
3	Vanuatu	0	1	0	1
5	French Polynesia	0	0	1	1
Totals (5 entries)		2	2	2	6

=== Results ===
Event	Gold	Silver	Bronze
Men's tournament	Papua New Guinea	Fiji	American Samoa
Women's tournament	American Samoa	Vanuatu	Tahiti

== See also ==
- Beach volleyball at the Pacific Games
