= Shooting at the 2015 Pacific Games =

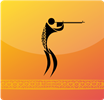
- Shooting pictogram for the Games
- Venue: June Valley Shooting Range, Port Moresby
- Dates: 6–11 July

Shooting at the 2015 Pacific Games was held from 6–11 July at the June Valley Shooting Range in Port Moresby, Papua New Guinea. Tahiti and Fiji were the most successful nations, winning three gold medals each. Medals were initially awarded for teams in the pistol shooting section, but as team events for pistols were not included in the official schedule those medals were withdrawn.

== Medal summary ==
=== Medal table ===
* Host nation (Papua New Guinea)

Rank	Nation	Gold	Silver	Bronze	Total
1	Tahiti	3	4	3	10
2	Fiji	3	2	1	6
3	New Caledonia	2	2	1	5
4	Papua New Guinea*	1	2	0	3
5	Norfolk Island	1	1	2	4
6	Samoa	1	0	3	4
7	Guam	0	0	1	1
Totals (7 entries)		11	11	11	33

=== Pistol results ===
Five pistol events were hosted at the indoor shooting range. All were for individual shooters only, no team medals were on offer. The 10 metre air pistol was held as separate men's and women's competitions. The 25 metre standard pistol event was open to both men and women (i.e. not gender specific). There were two events for the 25 metre pistol (also known as the sport pistol) – one open, and one for women shooters only.

Event	Gold		Silver		Bronze		Ref
Air pistol 10 m – men	Gabriel Lan San (TAH)	176.1	Kevin Coulter (NFK)	175.4	Douglas Creek (NFK)	156.7	
Air pistol 10 m – women	Maeva Darius (TAH)	181.3	Tania Mairi (PNG)	173.9	Amalia Duenas (GUM)	154.3	
Standard pistol 25 m – open	Faiyum Khan (FIJ)	505	Freddy Yen Kway (TAH)	504	Douglas Creek (NFK)	490	(Note: The 25 metre standard pistol (mixed) event was won by Fiji's Faiyum Khan, as reported in The Fiji Times. The photograph accompanying the report shows Fayam on the podium as the gold medallist with Freddy Yen Kway from Tahiti as the silver medallist, and Norfolk Island's Douglas Creek as the bronze medallist. Norfolk won a total of four medals in shooting at the 2015 Games.)
Sport pistol 25 m – open	Douglas Creek (NFK)	526	Freddy Yen Kway (TAH)	524	Johan Perchard (NCL)	522	
Sport pistol 25 m – women	Tania Mairi (PNG)	490	Carmelita Donald (PNG)	465	Marie-Louise Darius (TAH)	457	

=== Shotgun results ===
Six clay target events were held on the down-the-line shotgun range, contested within three disciplines; double barrel (also known as single rise), single barrel, and points score. Medals were awarded for both individual and team events in each discipline. The shotgun competition was not gender specific, with all events open to men and women.

Event	Gold		Silver		Bronze		Ref
Double barrel – individual	Glenn Kable (FIJ)	121	Christian Stephen (FIJ)	120	Moeava Bambridge (TAH)	99	
Double barrel – team	Fiji; Adarsh Datt; Glenn Kable; Christian Stephen	295	New Caledonia; Walter Le Pironnec; Kévin Lepigeon; Marion Roumagne	294	Tahiti; Tuanua Degage; Alexandre Lehartel; Jean-Hiro Pratx	291	
Single barrel – individual	Kévin Lepigeon (NCL)	96	Phillippe Simoni (NCL)	95	Eddie Chen Pao (SAM)	95	
Single barrel – team	New Caledonia; Kévin Lepigeon; Marion Roumagne; Phillippe Simoni	279	Tahiti; Moeava Bambridge; Tuanua Degage; Jean-Hiro Pratx	278	Samoa; Leasi Galuvao; Paul Loibl; Eddie Chen Pao	275	(Note: As reported on the Port Moresby 2015 official website, gold, silver and bronze in the single barrel (mixed) team event was won by New Caledonia, Tahiti and Samoa, respectively. The photograph accompanying the article shows (L-R) Tahiti's Moeava Bambridge, Jean-Hiro Pratx and Tuanua Degage as the silver medallists, Marion Roumagne, Kévin Lepigeon and Phillippe Simon as the gold medallists, and Eddie Chen Pao, Paul Loibl and Leasi Galuvao as the bronze medallists.)
Points score – individual	Eddie Chen Pao (SAM)	295	Tuanua Degage (TAH)	293	Glenn Kable (FIJ)	289	
Points score – team	Tahiti; Moeava Bambridge; Tuanua Degage; Hiro Praxt	859	Fiji; Adarsh Datt; Glenn Kable; Christian Stephen	858	Samoa; Leasi Galuvao; Paul Loibl; Eddie Chen Pao	853	

== Participating nations ==
There were eight countries competing:

- Fiji
- Guam
- New Caledonia
- Niue
- Norfolk Island
- Papua New Guinea
- Samoa
- Tahiti
