= Rugby league nines at the 2015 Pacific Games =

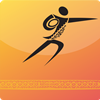
- Rugby league 9's pictogram for the Games
- Venue: Sir John Guise Stadium
- Location: Port Moresby, Papua New Guinea
- Dates: 11–12 July 2015
- Teams: 6

Medalists
gold medal	Papua New Guinea
silver medal	Western Samoa
bronze medal	Tonga

Rugby league nines at the 2015 Pacific Games was held from 11–12 July 2015 at Sir John Guise Stadium. Hosts Papua New Guinea won the gold medal, defeating Samoa in the final by 38–10. Tonga took the bronze medal, defeating the Cook Islands by 16–14 in the third place match. PNG's Wartovo Puara Jr was named Player of the Tournament.

== Medal summary ==
=== Medal table ===
Rank	Nation	Gold	Silver	Bronze	Total
1	Papua New Guinea	1	0	0	1
2	Samoa	0	1	0	1
3	Tonga	0	0	1	1
Totals (3 entries)		1	1	1	3

=== Results ===
Event	Gold	Silver	Bronze
Men	Papua New Guinea	Samoa	Tonga

== Teams ==
Cook Islands	Fiji	Papua New Guinea	Western Samoa	Solomon Islands	Tonga
Bernard Faireka; Mau George; Bilsy Gukisuva; Bobby Hansen; William Kauvai; Cheydan Mani; John Marsters; Peter Marsters; Ngamata Miriau; Desmond Nicholas; Teu Paerau; Sirla Pera; Jamane Pureaw; Teina Savage; Hosea Taripo; Vaine Toa; Stanley Tobia; Louisson Tuaivi; Morey Vati	Waisea Bati; Wame Belolevu; Esira Dokoni; Eliki Ledua; Jiuta Lutumailagi; Jovilisi Naqitawa; Roko Naulivou; Etuate Qionimacawa; Nemani Raiwalui; Tomasi Ravouvou; Etika Rokobuli; Asaeli Saravaki; Jone Sariri; Nereo Senimoli; Lepani Tacikalou	Bland Abavu; Stargroth Amean; Ase Boas; Watson Boas; Israel Eliab (c); David Lapua; Willie Minoga; Kato Ottio; Brandy Peter; Wartovo Puara; Gahuna Silas; Thompson Teteh; Henry Wan; Adex Wera; Rex Yellon; Noel Zeming	Tautua Faauila; Ramon Filipine; Faalele Iosua; Fosi McCarthy; Arnold Meredith; Tanielu Pasene; Leia Saofaiga; Henry Suauu; Ionatana Tino; Pousea Tofilau; Onopene Tuaia; Uati Mikaele Uati; Albert Viali; Aotealofa Wines	Bruce Angikimua; Zanetana Djokovic; Maitoo Hauirae; Atson Hou; Elwin John; Mostyn Maenuu Jnr; Ezekiel Mana; Jeffery Maungatuu; Steve Moana; Jimmy Puia; Timo Sanga; Moses Singamoana; Rodney Sinugeba; Tuimaugi Kauga; Lavan Taika; Duran Taupongi; Eugene Tekobi; Carlwyn Tengemoana; Tingiia Tino; Billy Toatee Jnr; Lavern Tuhatangata; Utu Willy Jnr	Sione Fa; Samuela Fiefia; Bruce Folau; Uikilifi Fotuaika; Sydney Havea; Leiataua Kilifi; Vahai Nau; Timote Paseka; Sosefo Suluka; Elone Taufahema; Ofa Teisina; Viliami Tupou; Pita Vakautakakala
Coach: Albert Nicholas	Coach: Maika Vunivere	Coach: Michael Marum	Coach: Mike Felise	Coach: Kauka Havea	Coach: Taufa Fukofuka

== Matches ==
=== Preliminary round ===
Team	Pld	W	D	L	PF	PA	+/−	Pts
Papua New Guinea	5	5	0	0	158	20	+138	10
Fiji	5	4	0	1	66	44	+22	8
Samoa	5	2	1	2	98	70	28	5
Tonga	5	2	0	3	60	86	-26	4
Cook Islands	5	1	1	3	74	80	-6	3
Solomon Islands	5	0	0	5	20	176	-156	0

11 July 2015

Fiji	16 – 10	Samoa

Sir John Guise Outdoor Stadium

Cook Islands	32 – 10	Solomon Islands
	Report

Sir John Guise Outdoor Stadium

Papua New Guinea	42 – 0	Tonga
	Report

Sir John Guise Outdoor Stadium

Cook Islands	12 - 14	Fiji

Sir John Guise Outdoor Stadium

Samoa	20 – 8	Tonga
	Report

Sir John Guise Outdoor Stadium

Papua New Guinea	42 – 4	Solomon Islands

Sir John Guise Outdoor Stadium

Cook Islands	10 – 14	Tonga

Sir John Guise Outdoor Stadium

Papua New Guinea	30 – 0	Samoa

Sir John Guise Outdoor Stadium

Fiji	16 – 0	Solomon Islands
	Report

Sir John Guise Outdoor Stadium

Cook Islands	4 – 26	Papua New Guinea
	Report

Sir John Guise Outdoor Stadium

Fiji	8 – 4	Tonga
	Report

Sir John Guise Outdoor Stadium

Samoa	52 – 0	Solomon Islands
	Report

Sir John Guise Outdoor Stadium

12 July 2015

Cook Islands	16 – 16	Samoa
	Report

Sir John Guise Outdoor Stadium

Fiji	12 –18	Papua New Guinea
	Report

Sir John Guise Outdoor Stadium

Solomon Islands	6 – 34	Tonga
	Report

Sir John Guise Outdoor Stadium

=== Finals ===
Semi-finals
Papua New Guinea	36
Tonga	6
Fiji	12
Samoa	20

Final
Papua New Guinea	38
Samoa	10
Third place
Tonga	16
Fiji	14

12 July 2015

Papua New Guinea	36 – 6	Tonga
	Report

Sir John Guise Outdoor Stadium

Fiji	12 – 20	Samoa
	Report

Sir John Guise Outdoor Stadium

Cook Islands	42 – 8	Solomon Islands
	Report

Sir John Guise Outdoor Stadium

Tonga	16 – 14	Fiji
	Report

Sir John Guise Outdoor Stadium

Papua New Guinea	38 – 10	Tonga
	Report; Report

Sir John Guise Outdoor Stadium

== Rankings ==
Classification
1st place, gold medalist(s)	Papua New Guinea
2nd place, silver medalist(s)	Samoa
3rd place, bronze medalist(s)	Tonga
4	Fiji
5	Cook Islands
6	Solomon Islands

== See also ==
- Rugby league at the Pacific Games
