= Karate at the 2015 Pacific Games =

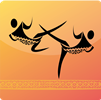
- Karate pictogram for the Games
- Venue: Taurama Aquatic & Indoor Centre, Port Moresby
- Dates: 13–14 July

Karate at the 2015 Pacific Games in Port Moresby, Papua New Guinea was held on 13–14 July at the Taurama Aquatic & Indoor Centre.

== Medal summary ==
=== Medal table ===
* Host nation (Papua New Guinea)

Rank	Nation	Gold	Silver	Bronze	Total
1	New Caledonia	7	4	3	14
2	Fiji	7	4	1	12
3	Papua New Guinea*	1	5	8	14
4	Vanuatu	1	2	4	7
5	French Polynesia	1	2	2	5
6	Solomon Islands	0	0	3	3
6	Wallis and Futuna	0	0	3	3
Totals (7 entries)		17	17	24	58

=== Men's Results ===
Event	Gold	Silver	Bronze	Refs
Individual Kata	Vu Duc Minh Dack (NCL)	Anthony Yam (FIJ)	Noa Lucas (TAH)	
Individual Kata	Vu Duc Minh Dack (NCL)	Anthony Yam (FIJ)	Cosmas Saliawali (PNG)	
Team Kata	New Caledonia	Fiji	Papua New Guinea	
Kumite −60 kg	Nigel Bana (PNG)	Sandip Pala (FIJ)	Steven Manaruru (VAN)	
Kumite −60 kg	Nigel Bana (PNG)	Sandip Pala (FIJ)	Jean-Emmanuel Faure (NCL)	
Kumite −67 kg	Tevita Tamanigaunatawamudu (FIJ)	Waixen Waikata (NCL)	Ashley Marigeni (SOL)	
Kumite −67 kg	Tevita Tamanigaunatawamudu (FIJ)	Waixen Waikata (NCL)	Dominic Sipapi (PNG)	
Kumite −75 kg	Joji Veremulua (FIJ)	Honoiti Lien (TAH)	Tumu Lango (VAN)	
Kumite −75 kg	Joji Veremulua (FIJ)	Honoiti Lien (TAH)	Iwe Rene Hmana (NCL)	
Kumite −84 kg	Mathieu Annonier (NCL)	Vincent Bougen (PNG)	Selwyn Kuru (SOL)	
Kumite −84 kg	Mathieu Annonier (NCL)	Vincent Bougen (PNG)	Paino Mulikihaamea (WLF)	
Kumite +84 kg	Kenny Guillem (NCL)	Johnny Laau (VAN)	James Lenoa (FIJ)	
Kumite +84 kg	Kenny Guillem (NCL)	Johnny Laau (VAN)	Robert Anita (SOL)	
Kumite open individual	Frederic Roumagner (NCL)	Tumu Lango (VAN)	Anapa Otcenasek (TAH)	
Kumite open individual	Frederic Roumagner (NCL)	Tumu Lango (VAN)	Ishamel Stanley (PNG)	
Kumite Team	Fiji	New Caledonia	Papua New Guinea	

=== Women's Results ===
Event	Gold	Silver	Bronze	Refs
Individual Kata	Angelique Mondoloni (NCL)	Naomi Bakani (FIJ)	Crystal Mari (PNG)	
Individual Kata	Angelique Mondoloni (NCL)	Naomi Bakani (FIJ)	Vamule Lango (VAN)	
Team Kata	Fiji	New Caledonia	Papua New Guinea	
Kumite −50 kg	Vamule Lango (VAN)	Jacklyn Barney (PNG)	none	
Kumite −55 kg	Not officially contested, no medals awarded.			
Kumite −61 kg	Adi Kidia (FIJ)	Catherine Wilson (PNG)	none	
Kumite −68 kg	Naomi Bakani (FIJ)	Romina Rambans (NCL)	Janet Gwai (SOL)	
Kumite −68 kg	Naomi Bakani (FIJ)	Romina Rambans (NCL)	Doris Karomo (PNG)	
Kumite +68 kg	Vaitiare Tehaameamea (TAH)	Gewa Bianca Rupa (PNG)	none	
Kumite open individual	Morane Vacher (NCL)	Vaitiare Tehaameamea (TAH)	Doris Karomo (PNG)	
Kumite open individual	Morane Vacher (NCL)	Vaitiare Tehaameamea (TAH)	Vamule Lango (VAN)	
Kumite Team	Fiji	Papua New Guinea	New Caledonia	
