= Outrigger canoeing at the 2015 Pacific Games =

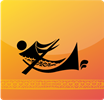
- Outrigger canoeing pictogram for the Games
- Venue: PNGDF Naval Base, Port Moresby
- Dates: 6–11 July

Outrigger canoeing at the 2015 Pacific Games in Port Moresby, Papua New Guinea was held on July 6–11, 2015.

== Medal summary ==
=== Medal table ===
* Host nation (Papua New Guinea)

Rank	Nation	Gold	Silver	Bronze	Total
1	French Polynesia	10	2	0	12
2	Cook Islands	1	3	3	7
3	Papua New Guinea*	1	1	0	2
4	New Caledonia	0	6	2	8
5	Wallis and Futuna	0	0	4	4
6	Fiji	0	0	2	2
7	Guam	0	0	1	1
Totals (7 entries)		12	12	12	36

=== Men's results ===
Event	Gold		Silver		Bronze		Ref
V1 500 m	Tuatini Makiroto-Piritua (TAH)	2:35.47	Titouan Puyo (NCL)		Jacky Tuakoifenua (WLF)		
V6 500 m	Tahiti		New Caledonia		Wallis and Futuna		
V6 1500 m	Tahiti		Cook Islands		Guam		
V12 500 m	Tahiti	1:59.94	New Caledonia	2:02.01	Wallis and Futuna	2:02.71	
V1 15 km (time= hr:min:sec)	Revi Thon Sing (TAH)		Tituoan Puyo (NCL)		Joseph Amo (COK)		
V6 30 km (time= hr:min:sec)	Tahiti	2:22:02	New Caledonia		Cook Islands		

=== Women's results ===
Event	Gold		Silver		Bronze		Ref
V1 500 m	Brenda Vaimiti Maoni (TAH)	3:05.48	Lovaina Tetuira (NCL)		Serena Hunter (COK)		
V6 500 m	Tahiti		Papua New Guinea		Wallis and Futuna		
V6 1500 m	Tahiti		Cook Islands		Fiji		
V12 500 m	Papua New Guinea	2:26.61	Tahiti	2:26.70	Fiji	2:42.51	
V1 10 km (time= hr:min:sec)	Serena Hunter (COK)		Brenda Vaimiti Maoni (TAH)		Lovaina Tetuira (NCL)		
V6 20 km (time= hr:min:sec)	Tahiti	1:14.30	Cook Islands		New Caledonia		
