= Bodybuilding at the 2015 Pacific Games =

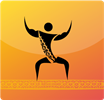
- Bodybuilding pictogram for the Games
- Venue: Caritas Technical Secondary School, Port Moresby
- Dates: 13 July

Bodybuilding at the 2015 Pacific Games in Port Moresby, Papua New Guinea was held on July 13, 2015 at the Caritas Secondary School. In the men's competition Papua New Guinea won five gold medals. Tonga won three gold medals in the men’s heavy categories, as well as the men’s overall title which went to Trevor Huni. New Caledonia and American Samoa took one gold medal each in the women's competition. Virginie Foucault won the overall women's title.

== Medal summary ==
=== Medal table ===
* Host nation (Papua New Guinea)

Rank	Nation	Gold	Silver	Bronze	Total
1	Papua New Guinea*	5	4	1	10
2	Tonga	4	0	2	6
3	New Caledonia	2	2	1	5
4	American Samoa	1	0	0	1
5	Fiji	0	3	2	5
6	Solomon Islands	0	1	1	2
7	French Polynesia	0	0	2	2
8	Niue	0	0	1	1
Totals (8 entries)		12	10	10	32

=== Men's Results ===
Event	Gold		Silver		Bronze		Refs
-65 kg	Mark Donald (PNG)	46.0	Rocky Teklem (SOL)	54.0	Yvan Thales (NCL)	60.0	
-70 kg	Selen Jim (PNG)	68.0	Nelson Sanmarso (NCL)	70.0	Gary Colombani (TAH)	73.0	
-75 kg	Jack Viyufa (PNG)	70.0	Matthieu Soerjana (NCL)	72.0	Leslie Faarodo (SOL)	74.0	
-80 kg	Steve Bomal (PNG)	75.0	Lewaitasi Biliwaqa (FIJ)	77.0	Sitani Tautalanoa (TGA)	78.0	
-85 kg	Wilfred Kurua (PNG)	80.0	Inoke Ligairi (FIJ)	81.0	Kapiolani Mausia (TGA)	84.0	
-90 kg	Trevor Jimmy Huni (TGA)	83.0	Donald Kaiwi (PNG)	87.0	Jekesoni Yanuyanudrua (FIJ)		
-100 kg	Manase Afuhaamango (TGA)	93.0	Pascol Sabin (PNG)	95.0	Jean Yann Matiere (TAH)	99.0	
+100 kg	Standford Faaui (TGA)	105.0	Michael Mondo (PNG)	109.0	Reagan Ioane (NIU)	112.0	
Overall title	Trevor Jimmy Huni (TGA)	N/A					

Notes

- ^{Under 90 kg} The original silver medallist, Stanley Bruneau of Tahiti, was disqualified after testing positive for a prohibited drug. Donald Kaiwi was awarded the silver medal. Fiji's Jekesoni Yanuyanudrua was awarded the bronze medal.

=== Women's Results ===
Event	Gold		Silver		Bronze		Refs
-55 kg	Virginie Foucault (NCL)	37.0	Maryann Moss (FIJ)	56.0	Pau Moses (PNG)	78.0	
+55 kg	Ursula Teo Martin (ASM)	56.0	Misa Avefa (PNG)	57.0	Haifa June Work (FIJ)	59.0	
Overall title	Virginie Foucault (NCL)	N/A					
