= Lawn bowls at the 2015 Pacific Games =

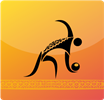
- Lawn bowls pictogram for the Games
- Venue: Bisini Lawn Bowls Greens, Port Moresby
- Dates: 13–18 July
- Competitors: 57 from 6 nations

Lawn bowls at the 2015 Pacific Games was held 13–18 July 2015 in Port Moresby, Papua New Guinea.

== Medal summary ==
=== Medal table ===
* Host nation (Papua New Guinea)

Rank	Nation	Gold	Silver	Bronze	Total
1	Fiji	3	2	3	8
2	Papua New Guinea*	2	3	1	6
3	Cook Islands	2	1	4	7
4	Norfolk Island	1	1	0	2
5	Niue	0	1	0	1
Totals (5 entries)		8	8	8	24

=== Men's results ===
Event	Gold	Silver	Bronze	Refs
Singles	Fiji; David Aitcheson	Norfolk Island; Phillip Jones	Papua New Guinea; Anthony Yogiyo	
Pairs	Norfolk Island; Phillip Jones; Gary Bigg	Fiji; Waisea Turaga; Semesa Naiseruvati	Cook Islands; Lawrence Paniani; Peter Totoo	
Triples	Fiji; Arun Kumar; David Aitcheson; Rajnesh Kumar	Papua New Guinea; Polin Pomaleu; Lucas Roika; Peter Juni	Cook Islands; Phillip Tangi; Joseph Akaruru; Ioane Inatou	
Fours	Cook Islands; Peter Totoo; Phillip Tangi; Joseph Akaruru; Ioane Inatou	Papua New Guinea; Matu Matso Bazo; Polin Pomaleu; Lucas Roika; Peter Juni	Fiji; Waisea Turaga; Semesa Naiseruvati; Arun Kumar; Rajnesh Kumar	

=== Women's results ===
Event	Gold	Silver	Bronze	Refs
Singles	Cook Islands; Teokotai Rahui Jim	Papua New Guinea; Ju Melissa Carlo	Fiji; Radhika Prasad	
Pairs	Papua New Guinea; Cesley Simbinali; Ju Melissa Carlo	Fiji; Radhika Prasad; Sarote Hiagi	Cook Islands; Linda Vavia; Teokotai Rahui Jim	
Triples	Fiji; Litia Tikoisuva; Sheral Mar; Elizabeth Moceiwai	Niue; Pauline Rex Blumsky; Catherine Papani; Fouasosa Tohovaka	Cook Islands; Irene Carfax-Foster; Porea Elisa; Nooroa Daniel	
Fours	Papua New Guinea; Mondin Tiba; Cesley Simbinali; Angela Simbinali; Catherine Wimp	Cook Islands; Irene Carfax-Foster; Porea Elisa; Nooroa Daniel; Linda Vavia	Fiji; Sarote Hiagi; Litia Tikoisuva; Sheral Mar; Elizabeth Moceiwai	

== See also ==
- Lawn bowls at the Pacific Games
