= Table tennis at the 2015 Pacific Games =

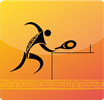
- Table tennis pictogram for the Games
- Venue: Caritas Technical Secondary School, Port Moresby
- Dates: 3–10 July

Table tennis at the 2015 Pacific Games in Port Moresby, Papua New Guinea was held on July 3–10, 2015. The competition included four parasport events: Men's singles – seated, women's singles – seated, men's singles – ambulatory, and women's singles – ambulatory. Tahiti dominated the competition, winning seven of the eleven gold medals on offer.

== Medal summary ==
=== Medal table ===
* Host nation (Papua New Guinea)

Rank	Nation	Gold	Silver	Bronze	Total
1	French Polynesia	7	2	4	13
2	New Caledonia	2	4	1	7
3	Fiji	2	0	1	3
4	Papua New Guinea*	0	3	0	3
5	Vanuatu	0	2	2	4
6	Solomon Islands	0	0	1	1
Totals (6 entries)		11	11	9	31

=== Men's ===
Event	Gold	Silver	Bronze	Ref
Singles	Alize Belrose (TAH)	Yoshua Shing (VAN)	Ocean Belrose (TAH)	
Doubles	(French Polynesia) Tahiti; Alize Belrose; Ocean Belrose	(New Caledonia) New Caledonia; Stéphane Gilabert; Laurent Sens	(French Polynesia) Tahiti; Tinihau Klouman; Gregoire Dossier	
Team	(French Polynesia) Tahiti; Gregoire Dossier; Hugo Gendron; Tinihau Klouman; Alizé Belrose; Ocean Belrose	New Caledonia; Jeremy Dey; Frederic Faure; Stephane Gilabert; Laurent Sens	Vanuatu; Alan Lam; Ham Lulu; Yoshua Shing; Randy William	
Ambulant	Avelino Monteiro (NCL)	Haoda Agari (PNG)	John Christopher (FIJ)	
Seated	Iakoba Taberanibou (FIJ)	Iwakie Tumala (PNG)	none	

=== Women's ===
Event	Gold	Silver	Bronze	Ref
Singles	Melveen Richmond (TAH)	Cathy Gauthier (NCL)	Tearo Le Caill (TAH)	
Doubles	(French Polynesia) Tahiti; Aurélie Cyrine Sam; Tearo Le Caill	(French Polynesia) Tahiti; Rachel Hsiao; Melveen Richmond	New Caledonia; Fabianna Faehau; Vanina Santino	
Team	(French Polynesia) Tahiti; Rachel Hsiao; Tearo Le Caill; Melveen Richmond; Aurélie Cyrine Sam	New Caledonia; Ornella Bouteille; Cathy Gauthier; Vanina Santino; Fabianna Faehau	Vanuatu; Rosanna Abel; Anolyn Lulu; Stephanie Qwea	
Ambulant	Delphine André (NCL)	Mary Mali Ramel (VAN)	none	
Seated	Merewalesi Roden (FIJ)	Vero Paul Nime (PNG)	Hellen Saohaga (SOL)	

=== Mixed ===
Event	Gold	Silver	Bronze	Ref
Doubles	(French Polynesia) Tahiti; Melveen Richmond; Ocean Belrose	(French Polynesia) Tahiti; Alize Belrose; Aurelie Cyrine Sam	(French Polynesia) Tahiti; Rachel Hsiao; Tinihau Klouman	

== See also ==
- Table tennis at the Pacific Games
