= Bisini Parade Sports Complex =

Sports complex in Papua New Guinea

- Bisini Parade Sports Grounds
- Interactive map of Bisini Parade Sports Complex
- Location: Port Moresby, Papua New Guinea
- Coordinates: 9.472158403297659°S 147.2002953457412°E
- Operator: Papua New Guinea Sports Foundation
- Facilities: National Football Stadium; Rita Flynn Netball Centre; Amini Park; Bava Park; Bisini Bowling Lawns; Bisini Softball Precinct; Bisini Soccer Grounds

The Bisini Parade Sports Complex is a sports complex situated in Boroko, a suburb of the City of Port Moresby, National Capital District, Papua New Guinea, primarily for outdoor team sports.

The sporting complex has hosted several events as part of the 1991 South Pacific Games and 2015 Pacific Games. The 2016 FIFA U-20 Women's World Cup and the 2017 Rugby League World Cup are two of the most significant international events ever hosted at the sports ground. The complex was revamped for the Pacific Games in 2015 under the expertise and guidance of Australian firm, SGL consulting.

== Sports venues and stadiums ==
The sports complex is bordered to the north by Bisini Parade, to the east by Bava Street, to the south by the Angau Drive, and to the west by Lahara Avenue.

=== National Football Stadium ===
The Papua New Guinea Football Stadium, currently known as the Santos National Football Stadium due to sponsorship, and formerly called Lloyd Robson Oval until 2015, is the largest facility in the complex (capacity 15,000). It served as one of the venues for the 1989–1992 Rugby League World Cup, hosting three matches. Since 1975, it has been the home ground for the Papua New Guinea national rugby league team. The venue functions as the national stadium of the country. The stadium underwent a full redevelopment in preparation for the 2015 Pacific Games.

=== Rita Flynn Netball Centre ===
The Rita Flynn Netball Centre is the second largest facility in the complex (capacity 3,000; indoor). Named after Australian, Rita Flynn, one of the pioneers of PNG netball before independence, the centre serves as the national hub for netball in the country and hosts local, regional, and international competitions. Officially opened in 2015 ahead of the Pacific Games, the facility features both indoor and outdoor courts and meets international standards for netball events. It is managed by the Papua New Guinea Netball Federation.

=== Amini Park ===
Amini Park (capacity 2,000), is the main cricket ground in Papua New Guinea, and serves as the headquarters of Cricket PNG. Established in 1956 and officially named in 1983 to honour the Amini family, it is the home venue for both the men's and women's national teams. The ground has hosted international matches since 2016, including its first One Day International in 2017. Recent upgrades include a new turf wicket block and a high-performance training facility added between 2020 and 2021.

=== Bava Park ===
Bava Park (capacity 5,000), is a purposely built World Rugby standard rugby pitch with a natural grass surface. Originally redeveloped in 2015 for the Pacific Games and later refurbished and used as one of the four host venues for the 2016 FIFA U-20 Women's World Cup, it serves predominantly as a venue for rugby union matches.

=== Bisini Bowling Lawns ===
The Lawn Bowls Greens was created as a modern facility during redevelopment linked to the 2015 Pacific Games, where it served as the official lawn bowls venue for Games. Although unused for bowling immediately after the Games, in 2016 the Papua New Guinea Bowls Federation signed a lease with the PNG Sports Foundation to re‑activate the facility as the home of lawn bowls in NCD. Since then, the Bisini Lawn Bowls Club has hosted national fixtures (including the Geua Tau Cup introduced in 2018) and initiated junior development programmes to promote the sport locally.

== 2015 Pacific Games ==
For the 2015 Pacific Games, several venues hosted events. Cricket, lawn bowls, soccer (Preliminary stage), softball, and touch rugby events.
