= Golf at the 2019 Pacific Games =

- Venue: Royal Samoa Golf Course
- Location: Apia, Samoa
- Dates: 10–13 July 2019

Golf at the 2019 Pacific Games was held on 10–13 July 2019 at the Royal Samoa Golf Course in Fagali'i, approximately 5 kilometres south-east of Apia. Men's and women's tournaments were played, with medals awarded for individual and team events in each.

New Caledonia dominated the competition, winning all four gold medals and two silver medals. The host team Samoa won two silver and two bronze, with Fiji and Tahiti taking home a bronze medal each.

== Teams ==
The nations competing were:

- American Samoa
- Cook Islands
- Fiji
- Guam
- New Caledonia
- Niue
- Norfolk Island
- Northern Mariana Islands
- Papua New Guinea
- Samoa
- Solomon Islands
- Tahiti
- Tonga
- Vanuatu

== Medal summary ==
=== Medal table ===
* Host nation (Samoa)

Rank	Nation	Gold	Silver	Bronze	Total
1	New Caledonia	4	2	0	6
2	Samoa*	0	2	2	4
3	Fiji	0	0	1	1
3	Tahiti	0	0	1	1
Totals (4 entries)		4	4	4	12

=== Men's results ===
Event	Gold		Silver		Bronze	
Individual	Dylan Benoit; New Caledonia	283	Guillaume Castagne; New Caledonia	285	Van Wright; Samoa	286
Team	New Caledonia; Dylan Benoit; Guillaume Castagne; Morgan Dufour; Adrien Peres	861	Samoa; Van Wright; Robert Fa'aaliga; Samu Ropati; Niko Vui	861	Fiji; Olaf Allen; Asish Chand; Baarroon Hussain; Abid Hussain	886

=== Women's results ===
Event	Gold		Silver		Bronze	
Individual	Emilie Ricaud; New Caledonia	275	Ariane Klotz; New Caledonia	290	Olive Auva'a; Samoa	294
Team	New Caledonia; Emilie Ricaud; Ariane Klotz; Inès Lavelua-Tufele; Mathilde Guepy	858	Samoa; Olive Auva'a; Aileen Meredith; Leleaga Meredith; Faith Vui	884	Tahiti; Vaea Nauta; Maggy Dury; Flavia Reid-Amaru; Moea Simon	934

== See also ==
- Golf at the Pacific Games
