= Volleyball at the 2015 Pacific Games =

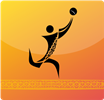
- Volleyball pictogram for the Games
- Venue: Taurama Aquatic & Indoor Centre, Port Moresby
- Dates: 11–18 July

Volleyball at the 2015 Pacific Games in Port Moresby, Papua New Guinea was held on July 11–18, 2015. Wallis and Futuna won the gold medal in the men's competition, defeating New Caledonia in the final. In the women's competition, American Samoa won the gold medal by defeating Tahiti in the final.

== Medal summary ==
=== Medal table ===
Rank	Nation	Gold	Silver	Bronze	Total
1	American Samoa	1	0	0	1
1	Wallis and Futuna	1	0	0	1
3	French Polynesia	0	1	1	2
3	New Caledonia	0	1	1	2
Totals (4 entries)		2	2	2	6

=== Results ===
Event	Gold	Silver	Bronze
Men	Wallis and Futuna	New Caledonia	Tahiti
Women	American Samoa	Tahiti	New Caledonia

== Teams ==
Eleven men's teams and nine women's teams participated in 2015:

=== Men's tournament ===
Pool A

- Guam
- Kiribati
- Papua New Guinea
- Solomon Islands
- Tahiti

Pool B

- American Samoa
- Fiji
- Nauru
- New Caledonia
- Tuvalu
- Wallis and Futuna

=== Women's tournament ===
Pool A

- American Samoa
- Fiji
- Tahiti
- Tuvalu
- Wallis and Futuna

Pool B

- Guam
- New Caledonia
- Papua New Guinea
- Solomon Islands
