= Tokelau at the 2015 Pacific Games =

- IOC code: TKL

4 July 2015 – 18 July 2015
- Competitors: 1 (1 man) in 1 sport
- Medals: Gold 0 Silver 0 Bronze 0 Total 0

Pacific Games appearances (overview)
- 1979; 1983; 1987–1999; 2003; 2007; 2011; 2015; 2019; 2023

Tokelau competed at the 2015 Pacific Games in Port Moresby, Papua New Guinea from 4 to 18 July 2015. The country was represented by one athlete, one coach and two officials. Tokelau was one of two countries that did not win a medal during the games.

== Squash ==
Main article: Squash at the 2015 Pacific Games

Men

- Sam Ben Sipili Iasona
