= Touch rugby at the 2015 Pacific Games =

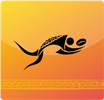
- Touch rugby pictogram for the Games
- Venue: Bisini – Touch Rugby Fields, Port Moresby
- Dates: 3–10 July

Touch rugby at the 2015 Pacific Games was held on 3–10 July 2015 at Port Moresby in Papua New Guinea. Papua New Guinea defeated Samoa in the finals of both the men's and women's tournament by 8–7 and 6–2, respectively to claim two of the three gold medals for touch rugby. Samoa turned the tables to claim the gold medal in the mixed tournament, defeating Papua New Guinea by 9–7 in the final. The Cook Islands won all three bronze medals.

== Medal summary ==
=== Medal table ===
Rank	Nation	Gold	Silver	Bronze	Total
1	Papua New Guinea	2	1	0	3
2	Samoa	1	2	0	3
3	Cook Islands	0	0	3	3
Totals (3 entries)		3	3	3	9

=== Results ===
Event	Gold	Silver	Bronze
Men	Papua New Guinea Kora David; Harry Kea; Uari Saea; Eugene Eka; Elison Waluka; Paul Kasisie; Kele Lessy; Diallo Luana; Bobby Vavona; William Ken; Marlon Steven; Paul Matuta; Ronald Bibiken; Samuel Vetu	Samoa Tasi Cortdz; David Fong; Laumata Laumata; Samoauatasi Siilata; Gregory Hazelman; Andrew Elisara; Jesse Leituvae; Eteuati Togiatomai; Rapi Vaai; Darren Aofia; Peter Hazelman; Michael Rasmussen; Alex Mikaele III; Sapati Gautasi	Cook Islands Kapi Anguna; Rangi-Te-Au-O-Tepuretu Piri; Cahjun Willis; Harmas Potoru; Teava Terangi; Hugh Henry; Benjamin Heather; Ngatupuna Joseph; Mokopuna Nooroa; Setephano Noovao; Apii Rau; Matamanea Matapakia; Kristopher Williamson; Heimona Potoru
Women	Papua New Guinea Angelena Watego; Joylyne Tikot; Monica Teite; Nadya Taubuso; Jenny Carol; Pauline Arazi; Patiyoko Bernard; Vavine Yore; Maria Alu; Grace Kouba; Margaret Luke; Marie Tuu; Diane Vetu; Natalie Kuper	Samoa Sabrina Reupena; Lepailetai Faaiuaso; Vai Leota; Eden Yandall; Gabrielle Apelu; Anna Maria Schuster; Celeste Solofa; Rowena Faaiuaso; Mandria Sua; Felicity Pogi; Lerissa Fong; Filoi Eneliko; Alofa Auvaa; Miriama Lima	Cook Islands Julieanne Westrupp; Hemilda Vavia; Edith Nicholas; Rangitauratua Apera; Taromi Urirau; Ngapare Noovao; Sunielia Tom; Rima'ati Moekaa; Teiti-O-Te-Ra Tupuna; Ngapoko Kamana; Dayna Napa; Princess Mary Adams; Matatai Taia; Lou-Ani Marsters
Mixed	Samoa	Papua New Guinea	Cook Islands

== See also ==
- Touch rugby at the Pacific Games
