= American Samoa at the 2015 Pacific Games =

- IOC code: ASA

4 July 2015 – 18 July 2015
- Competitors: 91 in 10 sports
- Medals Ranked 13th: Gold 3 Silver 1 Bronze 4 Total 8

Pacific Games appearances
- 1963; 1966; 1969; 1971; 1975; 1979; 1983; 1987; 1991; 1995; 1999; 2003; 2007; 2011; 2015; 2019; 2023

American Samoa competed at the 2015 Pacific Games in Port Moresby, Papua New Guinea from 4 to 18 July 2015. American Samoa listed 91 competitors as of 4 July 2015. Four competitors were qualified in two sports. (Note: Sigalu Aitui, Jane Vaialae Croson, Latoya Marshall and Nora Sharma Tuioti-Mariner qualified in volleyball and beach volleyball.)

== Basketball ==
Main article: Basketball at the 2015 Pacific Games

American Samoa qualified men's and women's basketball teams (total of 24 players):

Men

- Shane Letuu Dennis Ah Ping
- Frankie Sefulu Eteuati
- Earvin Magic Leiato
- Taele Jacob Leota
- Veresa Luvu Jr
- Paul Luamata Mccoy
- William James Mccoy
- Shaun Tuiaana Salavea
- Talanoa Arthur Smith
- Fitimauea Kerisiano Talaeai
- Desmond Taotofi
- Pele P J Tui Jr

Women

- Desiree Ale
- Kristen Ale
- Rheina Tapunia Ale
- Teriana Anastasia Iafeta
- Destiny King
- Anne Falahola Mendoza
- Tipesa Mercedes Moorer
- Valentine Nikkithia Talamoni
- Cecilia Rosary Taufaasau
- Hotia Mary Vaaimamao
- Kadrenna Fuafanua Gaylyne Velega
- Margaritta Manuialeolaga Viena

== Beach volleyball ==
Main article: Beach volleyball at the 2015 Pacific Games

American Samoa qualified six athletes in beach volleyball:

Men

- Sigalu Aitui
- Myles Tupu Muagututia
- Gustiano Tony Tuaniga

Women

- Jane Vaialae Croson
- Latoya Marshall
- Nora Sharma Tuioti-Mariner

== Bodybuilding ==
Main article: Bodybuilding at the 2015 Pacific Games

American Samoa qualified three athletes in bodybuilding:

Men

- Stallone Sinbad Nua
- Lucky Luciano Tran

Women

- Ursula Fitimafa Teo Martin

== Boxing ==
Main article: Boxing at the 2015 Pacific Games

American Samoa qualified one athlete in boxing:

Men

- George Alfred Tanoa Jr

== Golf ==
Main article: Golf at the 2015 Pacific Games

American Samoa qualified seven athletes in golf:

Men

- Pemerika Gillet
- Tulele T Laolagi
- Faalialia Mauigoa
- Kevin Maukoloa
- Sagapolutele Pelefoti
- Faasoasoaagatumua Carl Viena

Women

- Margaret Tupito Ruth Walker Gadalla

== Softball ==
Main article: Softball at the 2015 Pacific Games

American Samoa qualified a women's softball team (16 players):

Women

- Angela Suiavaoalii Ah Fook
- Bernadette Faatalaleleiga Crichton
- Musu Noekaralani Ifopo
- Denitra Sevenlittlesisters Langkilde
- Deborah Gabrielle Malauulu
- Faatupu Ravenmarie Malauulu
- Hannah Amuia Malauulu
- Rowena Mamea
- Deja Janet Irene Nua
- Sweetheart Natalie Nua
- Kelly Kelana Sailimalo Osterbrink
- Jennifer Lorna Pen-Afalava
- Danielle Hana Sagiao
- Sydnee Agnes Samoa
- Fiapaipai April Siatuu
- Jewel Fineole Savanah Vaka

== Swimming ==
Main article: Swimming at the 2015 Pacific Games

American Samoa qualified three athletes in swimming:

Men

- Daniel Tamatoa Hardman
- William Tairiata Hardman

Women

- Tilali Rose Leslie Scanlan

== Tennis ==
Main article: Tennis at the 2015 Pacific Games

American Samoa qualified seven athletes in tennis:

Men

- Christian Martin Duchnak
- Valentine Paul Fuji
- Larry John Vert Vigas Magalasin
- Kevin Jeffrey Maukoloa

Women

- Charity Murrieta Sagiao
- Kalani Pisi Soli
- Florence Wasko

== Volleyball ==
Main article: Volleyball at the 2015 Pacific Games

American Samoa qualified men's and women's volleyball teams in volleyball (22 players):

Men

- Sigalu Aitui
- Sigalu Selefuti Aitui
- Junior Faalologo
- Sam Samasoni Luaiva
- Jasper Aaron Mikaele
- Bob Stanley
- Tautua Suapusi
- Faaleo Tevaga
- Gustiano Tony Tuaniga
- Michael Lee Tuimavave
- Donovan Tupuola

Women

- Jane Vaialae Croson
- Norene Moe Iosia
- Saitaua Maureen Iosia
- Litara Susitina Keil
- Inutiraha Uluvao Malina Leau
- Latoya Marshall
- Rachelle Malia Suaava
- Leilia Tafvoyana Toomalatai
- Noralia Jilainique-Lagi Toomalatai
- Pati Tuimavave
- Nora Sharma Tuioti-Mariner

== Weightlifting ==
Main article: Weightlifting at the 2015 Pacific Games

American Samoa qualified six athletes in weightlifting:

Men

- Tanumafili Jungblut
- Malaki Atonio Jr Sitagata
- Apineru Vaoga

Women

- Monica Taumulioalii Afalava
- Jennade Ferline Ausage
- Orepa Rosery Talo
