= Football at the 2015 Pacific Games =

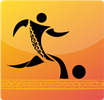
- Football pictogram for the Games

Event details
- Games: 2015 Pacific Games
- Host country: Papua New Guinea
- Dates: 3 – 17 July
- Venues: 2 (in 1 host city)
- Competitors: 328 from 11 nations

Men's tournament
- Teams: 8 (from 1 confederation)
Medalists
Gold	New Caledonia
Silver	Tahiti
Bronze	Papua New Guinea

Women's tournament
- Teams: 7 (from 1 confederation)
Medalists
Gold	Papua New Guinea
Silver	New Caledonia
Bronze	Cook Islands

Editions
- ← 2011 2019 →

Football at the 2015 Pacific Games in Port Moresby, Papua New Guinea was held on July 3–17, 2015.

The Games were brought to international attention when Vanuatu defeated Micronesia 46–0 in the men's tournament.

== Medal summary ==
=== Medal table ===
Rank	Nation	Gold	Silver	Bronze	Total
1	New Caledonia	1	1	0	2
2	Papua New Guinea	1	0	1	2
3	French Polynesia	0	1	0	1
4	Cook Islands	0	0	1	1
Totals (4 entries)		2	2	2	6

=== Results ===
Event	Gold	Silver	Bronze
Men	New Caledonia	Tahiti	Papua New Guinea
Women	Papua New Guinea	New Caledonia	Cook Islands
