= Tokelau at the Pacific Games =

Tokelau, a dependency of New Zealand, has taken part in the Pacific Games and Pacific Mini Games.

== Pacific Games medals ==
Tokelau at the Pacific Games
- IOC code: TKL
- Medals: Gold 3 Silver 2 Bronze 2 Total 7

Pacific Games appearances (overview)
- 1979; 1983; 1987–1999; 2003; 2007; 2011; 2015; 2019; 2023

Games	Athletes	Gold	Silver	Bronze	Total	Rank
(Fiji) 1979 Suva		0	0	0	0	14
(Samoa) 1983 Apia		0	0	0	0	14
1987-1999	Did not participate					
(Fiji) 2003 Suva		0	1	0	1	19
(Samoa) 2007 Apia		3	1	1	5	12
(New Caledonia) 2011 Nouméa	22	0	0	0	0	19
(Papua New Guinea) 2015 Port Morsby	1	0	0	0	0	23
(Samoa) 2019 Apia	72	0	0	1	1	23
(Solomon Islands) 2023 Honiara	1	0	0	0	0	24
Total		3	2	2	7	21

== Pacific Mini Games medals ==
Tokelau at the Pacific Mini Games
- Medals: Gold 0 Silver 2 Bronze 1 Total 3

Games	Athletes	Gold	Silver	Bronze	Total	Rank
(Cook Islands) 2009 Avarua	31	0	2	0	2	16
(Wallis and Futuna) 2011 Mata Utu		0	0	0	0	20
(Vanuatu) 2017 Port Vila		0	0	1	1	18
(Northern Mariana Islands) 2022 Saipan	Did not participate					
(Palau) 2025 Koror	Future event					
Total		0	2	1	3	24

== See also ==
- Tokelau at the Commonwealth Games
