= Taufa Fukofuka =

Tonga international rugby league footballer

Personal information
- Full name: Taufa Fukofuka
- Born: 22 October 1979 (age 47) Tonga

Playing information
- Position: Five-eighth
Representative
Years	Team	Pld	T	G	FG	P
2006	Tonga	1				0

Taufa Fukofuka (born October 22, 1979) is a Tongan rugby league footballer who plays as a five-eighth for the Mu'a Saints in the Tonga National Rugby League competition.

== Background ==
Fukofuka was born in Tonga.

== Career ==
Fukofuka has also appeared on several occasions for the Tonga national rugby league team with his most recent international games coming during the 2006 Federation Shield competition.

He coached Tonga's Rugby League 9's team at the 2015 Pacific Games.

In 2016 he sued Tonga National Rugby League over its failure to audit its accounts, and to require it to hold board elections.
