= Tokelau at the 2023 Pacific Games =

- Flag of Tokelau

19 November 2023 – 2 December 2023
- Competitors: 1 (1 man and 0 women) in 1 sport
- Flag bearer: Ilai Ualesi Elekana Manu
- Medals: Gold 0 Silver 0 Bronze 0 Total 0

Pacific Games appearances (overview)
- 1979; 1983; 1987–1999; 2003; 2007; 2011; 2015; 2019; 2023

Tokelau was represented at the 2023 Pacific Games in Honiara, Solomon Islands. Just one athlete was selected to represent the territory at the games which ran from 19 November to 2 December 2023 – Ilai Ualesi Elekana Manu. He contested the men's -81 kg category and the men's open category but was eliminated after his first fight in each.

== Background ==
In 2016, the Pacific Games Council awarded the right to host the 2023 Pacific Games to the National Olympic Committee of Solomon Islands. The multi-sport event would take place in Honiara, the capital of the Solomon Islands and was originally scheduled to take place between 16 and 19 July 2023. However, delays in preparations caused by the COVID-19 pandemic meant the games were delayed and would instead take place from 19 November to 2 December 2023.

Tokelau had first competed at the South Pacific Games in 1979. Their largest and most successful delegation was at the 2007 Pacific Games in Apia, Samoa when more than 100 athletes took part, winning five medals including three gold.

== Competitors ==
In total, one athlete represented Tokelau at the 2023 Pacific Games in Honiara, Solomon Islands in one sport.

Sport	Men	Women	Total
Judo	1	0	1
Total	1	0	1

== Judo ==
The judo events took place at the Solomon Islands Football Federation Academy in Honiara on 20 and 21 November 2023. Ilai Ualesi Elekana Manu was selected as the only Tokelauan judoka. He entered both the men's –81kg category – which took place on 20 November – and the men's open category – which took place on 21 November.

In the –81 kg category, Manu lost by ippon in his first round match against Paulo Taukafauli of New Caledonia. The following day, in the open category, Manu received a bye in the first round but lost his fight in the second round by ippon against Ponove Falevalu of New Caledonia.

Athlete	Event	Round of 32	Round of 16	Quarterfinals	Semifinals	Repechage	Final / GM	
Athlete	Event	Opposition Result	Opposition Result	Opposition Result	Opposition Result	Opposition Result	Opposition Result	Rank
Ilai Ualesi Elekana Manu	Men's -81 kg	N/A	(New Caledonia) Taukafauli; L 110–000	Did not advance				
Ilai Ualesi Elekana Manu	Men's open	Bye	(New Caledonia) Falevalu; L 100–000	Did not advance				
