= Tokelau at the 2011 Pacific Games =

Tokelau at the 2015 Pacific Games
- IOC code: TKL

27 August 2011 – 10 September 2011
- Competitors: 22 in 2 sports
- Medals: Gold 0 Silver 0 Bronze 0 Total 0

Pacific Games appearances (overview)
- 1979; 1983; 1987–1999; 2003; 2007; 2011; 2015; 2019; 2023

Tokelau competed at the 2011 Pacific Games in Nouméa, New Caledonia between August 27 and September 10, 2011. As of June 28, 2011 Tokelau has listed 22 competitors.

== Rugby Sevens ==
Tokelau qualified a men's team. Each team can consist of a maximum of 12 athletes. They finished in 8th place.

Men

- Lamese Pasene
- Usi Seu
- Lealofi Sasulu
- Etuale Tehoa Ioane
- Simona Puka
- Kosetatino Liufau
- Alosio Isaia
- Elika Teao
- Viliamu Ioapo
- Luaao Luapo
- Falima Tuumuli
- Iona Koloi

== Swimming ==
Tokelau has qualified 1 athlete.

Women

- Dannielle Gaualofa
