= Tokelau at the 2019 Pacific Games =

- IOC code: TKL

in Apia, Samoa 8 July 2019 – 20 July 2019
- Competitors: 72 (50 men and 22 women) in 7 sports
- Medals Ranked 23rd: Gold 0 Silver 0 Bronze 1 Total 1

Pacific Games appearances (overview)
- 1979; 1983; 1987–1999; 2003; 2007; 2011; 2015; 2019; 2023

Tokelau was represented at the 2019 Pacific Games in Apia, Samoa.

In total, 72 athletes including 50 men and 22 women represented Tokelau across seven different sports including judo, lawn bowls, netball, outrigger canoeing, rugby league nines, swimming and touch rugby.

Tokelau won one medal at the games after Sagato Alefosio and Konelio Luka claimed bronze in the lawn bowls men's pairs.

== Team ==
In total, 72 athletes represented Tokelau at the 2019 Pacific Games in Apia, Samoa across seven different sports.

Sport	Men	Women	Total
Judo	2	0	2
Lawn bowls	6	6	12
Netball	0	15	15
Rugby league nines	26	0	26
Swimming	1	0	1
Touch rugby	14	0	14
Va'a	1	1	2
Total	50	22	72

== Medalists ==
Tokelau won one medal at the games after Sagato Alefosio and Konelio Luka claimed bronze in the lawn bowls men's pairs.

Medal	Name	Sport	Event	Date
Bronze	Sagato Alefosio and Konelio Luka	Lawn bowls	Men's pairs	10 July

== Judo ==
In total, two Tokelauan athletes participated in the judo events – Ilai Manu and Peter Elekana.

== Lawn bowls ==
In total, 12 Tokelauan athletes participated in the lawn bowls events – Sagato Alefosio, Konelio Luka, Maselino Sakalia, Lafaele Vulu, Peni Panapa, Lotomalie Fakaalofa, Faasamoa Ineleo, Vaolina Linda Pedro, Opetera Samakia Ngatoko, Alieta Vulu, Larissa Kathryn and Anne Fefiloi Gately.

== Netball ==
In total, 15 Tokelauan athletes participated in the netball events – Agnes Faraimo, Rachel E. Toemahina Savelio, Ariana Fiaola, Angeline Eunique Kitiseni, Matalena Tufala, Melehina Chelsea Kilino-Lapana, Merisa Wolfgramm, Olivia Aunoa, Parehuia Kitiseni, Patricia Kershaw, Roseana Maria Feagaimaleata Faraimo, Tiale Simeona, Jackline Tillie Tuisano, Otilia Heipua Clarke and Olouta Faraimo.

== Outrigger canoeing ==
In total, two Tokelauan athletes participated in the outrigger canoeing events – Sefo Misky and Regina Ihipera Perez.

== Rugby league nines ==
In total, 26 Tokelauan athletes participated in the rugby league nines events – Mika Faiva Isaako, Mose Junior Teinafo Pelasio, Dennis Vavega Semo Vavega, Pili Samu, Ioane Doug Gaualofa, Lomi Malotiu Gaualofa, Kanava Pue, Pati Pajerika Safiti, Timi Junior Seloti Saumani, Sione Siliga, Tukifaga Wayne Etueni, Tehakolo Kalolo, Timoteo Sirila, Manatua Hetuati, Taualofa Filifili, Reupena Sini, Toloa Kalolo, Viane Alo Manuele, Onehimo Patrick Palesau, Isaac Misky, Iona Viliamu Atoni, Mike Fa'afoi Ioapo, Solomon Patelesio, Emelio Tavite, Iosefo M. Wright and Junior Fatia Perez.

== Swimming ==
In total, one Tokelauan athlete participated in the swimming events – Fa'alataitaua Fitisemanu.

== Touch rugby ==
In total, 14 Tokelauan athletes participated in the YY events – Lomi Malotiu Gaualofa, Tui Hope, Simi Isaako, Koro Faitu Koro, Viane Alo Manuele, Isaac Misky, Tino Pelesa, Mose Junior Teinafo Pelasio, Onehimo Patrick Palesau, Kanava Pue, Timi Junior Seloti Saumani, Tafahi Tavita and Ioane Hanele Wright.
