= Golf at the 2015 Pacific Games =

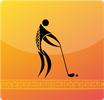
- Golf pictogram for the Games
- Venue: Royal Port Moresby Golf Club, Port Moresby
- Dates: 15–18 July

Golf at the 2015 Pacific Games was held at the Royal Port Moresby Golf Club in Papua New Guinea on 15–18 July 2015. Hosts Papua New Guinea took a clean sweep of the gold medals in both the men's and women's competitions, with New Caledonia, Cook Islands and Fiji claiming the minor medal positions.

== Medal summary ==
=== Medal table ===
* Host nation (Papua New Guinea)

Rank	Nation	Gold	Silver	Bronze	Total
1	Papua New Guinea*	4	0	0	4
2	New Caledonia	0	2	2	4
3	Cook Islands	0	2	1	3
4	Fiji	0	0	1	1
Totals (4 entries)		4	4	4	12

=== Men's results ===
Event	Gold		Silver		Bronze		Refs
Individual	Soti Dinki (PNG)	298	William Howard (COK)	302	Adrien Peres (NCL)	304	
Team	Papua New Guinea; Soti Dinki; Steven George; Wally Ilake; Brian Taikiri	917	New Caledonia; Dylan Benoit; Guillaume Castagne; Ugo Ottogalli; Adrien Peres	920	Fiji; Olaf Frank Grant Allen; Anuresh Chandra; Abid Hussain; Roneel Prakash	928	

=== Women's results ===
Event	Gold		Silver		Bronze		Refs
Individual	Kristine Seko (PNG)	303	Priscilla Viking (COK)	307	Arianne Klotz (NCL)	308	
Team	Papua New Guinea; Margaret Lavaki; Hazel Martin; Kristine Seko; Roslyn Taufa	947	New Caledonia; Abeline Fermaut; Pricilla Gracia; Tess Hillaireau; Arianne Klotz	951	Cook Islands; Memory Akama; Rotana Howard; Rowena Newbigging; Priscilla Viking	979	

== See also ==
- Golf at the Pacific Games
