= Toa Tanimo =

Samoa international netball player

Auteletoa Tanimo (born 8 June 1994) is a Samoan New Zealander netball player who plays as a goal attack and goal shoot. She has represented Samoa internationally as part of the Samoa national netball team.

Tanimo is from the villages of Pata Falelatai and Samalaeʻulu on the island of Savaiʻi. She has been playing netball since she was nine. She works as a physical education teacher at Westlake Girls High School in Auckland, New Zealand.

She was first selected for the Samoa national netball team in 2014. She was later in the teams for the 2015 and 2019 Netball World Cups, as well as its bronze medal-winning squad at the 2015 Pacific Games in Port Moresby, Papua New Guinea. She was selected for the squad for the 2022 PacificAus Sports Netball Series, and captained the team.

In July 2021, she was selected to be Samoa's national player for World Netball's "Voice of the Athlete" Working Group.
