= Softball at the 2015 Pacific Games =

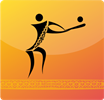
- Softball pictogram for the Games
- Venue: Bisini – Softball Diamonds, Port Moresby
- Dates: 15–17 July

Softball at the 2015 Pacific Games was held from 15 to 17 July 2015 at the Bisini Softball Diamonds. Only two teams entered the women's tournament: American Samoa and hosts Papua New Guinea.

The gold medal was decided by playing a best of three series, with Papua New Guinea winning 17–0 and 7–0 in the first two games.

== Events ==
=== Medal summary ===
Event	Gold	Silver	Bronze
Women	Papua New Guinea: Addie Amos; Anna Dick; Annette Maradi; Antonia Kinit; Beverly Pasen; Emma Markis; Florence Daple; Dhiadre Mautu; Hennie Warpin; Judy Nauvana; Juliet Seri; Lisa Polum; Nadia Bais; Siloru Zale; Tara Tomangana; Tahillah Fong; Tenisha Kuveu; Encie NK Simitap; Joyce Inguba; Lisa Malum; Marina Millingin; Natasha Pilak	American Samoa: Angela Ah Fook; Bernadette Crichton; Musu Ifopo; Denitra Langkilde; Deborah Malauulu; Faatupu Malauulu; Hannah Malauulu; Rowena Mamea; Deja Nua; Sweetheart Nua; Kelly Osterbrink; Jennifer Pen-Afalava; Danielle Sagiao; Sydnee Samoa; Fiapaipai Siatuu; Jewel Vaka	not awarded
