= Squash at the 2015 Pacific Games =

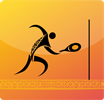
- Squash pictogram for the Games
- Venue: Port Moresby Racquets Club, Port Moresby
- Dates: 6–17 July

Squash at the 2015 Pacific Games in Port Moresby, Papua New Guinea was held on July 6–17, 2015.

== Medal summary ==
=== Medal table ===
Rank	Nation	Gold	Silver	Bronze	Total
1	New Caledonia	4	1	4	9
2	Papua New Guinea	3	4	2	9
3	Fiji	0	2	1	3
Totals (3 entries)		7	7	7	21

=== Medalists ===
Men's

Event	Gold	Silver	Bronze
Singles	Nicolas Massenet (NCL)	Madako Junior Suari (PNG)	Gael Gosse (NCL)
Doubles	Fabian Dinh and Nicolas Massenet; New Caledonia	Marika Matanatabu and Romit Parshottam; Fiji	Gael Gosse and Laurent Guepy; New Caledonia
Team	New Caledonia; Fabian Dinh; Gael Gosse; Laurent Guepy; Yann Lancrenon; Nicolas Massenet	Fiji; Justin Ho; Marika Matanatabu; Andrew McGoon; Sailesh Pala; Romit Parshottam; Nitesh Prasad	Papua New Guinea; Lokes Brooksbank; Robin Morove; Madako Junior Suari; Moreaina Wei

Women's

Event	Gold	Silver	Bronze
Singles	Lynette Vai (PNG)	Eli Webb (PNG)	Claire Faucompré (NCL)
Doubles	Sylvaine Durand and Christelle Nagle; New Caledonia	Nicole Gibbs and Sheila Morove; Papua New Guinea	Lynette Vai and Eli Webb; Papua New Guinea
Team	Papua New Guinea; Imong Brooksbank; Sheila Morove; Lynette Vai; Eli Webb	New Caledonia; Jennifer Corigliano; Christine Deneufbourg; Sylvaine Durand; Claire Faucompre; Kareen Hamou; Christelle Nagle	Fiji; Linda Barton; Makita Sokidi; Andra Whiteside; Danielle Whiteside; Gabriella Wong

Mixed

Event	Gold	Silver	Bronze
Doubles	Madako Junior Suari and Lynette Vai; Papua New Guinea	Robin Morove and Eli Webb; Papua New Guinea	Laurent Guepy and Kareen Hamou; New Caledonia
