= Marshall Islands at the 2015 Pacific Games =

4 July 2015 – 18 July 2015
- Competitors: 10 in 4 sports
- Medals Ranked 22nd: Gold 0 Silver 0 Bronze 5 Total 5

Pacific Games appearances
- 1999; 2003; 2007; 2011; 2015; 2019; 2023

The Marshall Islands competed at the 2015 Pacific Games in Port Moresby, Papua New Guinea from 4 to 18 July 2015. The Marshall Islands listed 10 competitors as of 4 July 2015.

== Athletics ==
Marshall Islands qualified one athlete in track and field:

Men

- Jeki Lanki

== Beach volleyball ==
Marshall Islands qualified a women's beach volleyball team (3 athletes):

Women

- Angelina John
- Carolyn Hone
- Darcyann Muller

== Swimming ==
Marshall Islands qualified three athletes in swimming:

Women

- Ann-Marie Hepler
- Colleen Furgeson

Men

- Giordan Harris

== Taekwondo ==
Marshall Islands qualified one athlete in taekwondo:

Men

- Jason Sam

== Weightlifting ==
Marshall Islands qualified two athletes in weightlifting:

Women

- Mathlynn Robert-Sasser

Men

- Kabuati Bob
