= Northern Mariana Islands at the 2015 Pacific Games =

- IOC code: NMI

4 July 2015 – 18 July 2015
- Competitors: 26 in 8 sports
- Medals: Gold 0 Silver 0 Bronze 0 Total 0

Pacific Games appearances
- 1979; 1983; 1987; 1991; 1995; 1999; 2003; 2007; 2011; 2015; 2019; 2023

The Northern Mariana Islands competed at the 2015 Pacific Games in Port Moresby, Papua New Guinea from 4 to 18 July 2015. The Northern Mariana Islands listed 26 competitors as of 4 July 2015. One competitor qualified for two sports. (Note: Anthony Richard Stearns qualified in triathlon and sailing.)

== Athletics ==
Northern Mariana Islands qualified 2 athletes in track and field:

Men

- Beouch Ogumoro Ngirchongor
- Orrin Ogumoro Pharmin

== Beach volleyball ==
Northern Mariana Islands qualified 2 athletes in beach volleyball:

Men

- Andrew Scott Johnson
- Clay McCullough-Stearns

== Bodybuilding ==
Northern Mariana Islands qualified 3 athletes in bodybuilding:

Men

- Gerald Christopher Panaligan Galang
- Donivan Benavente Mendiola
- Aaron James Quitugua Tomokane

== Outrigger canoeing ==
Northern Mariana Islands qualified 8 athletes in va'a:

Men

- Joe Erra Ayuyu
- Carter Aguon A. Calma
- Ketson Kabiriel
- James Ka Hing Lee
- Dino Anfranc Manning
- Benusto Jonavan Lisua Olopai
- Jose Tenorio Quan
- Jason Takami Tarkong
- Joshua Ngiraibai Franklin Andrew

== Golf ==
Northern Mariana Islands qualified 4 athletes in golf:

Men

- Joseph Sasamoto Sasamoto Camacho
- Harry Taitano Nakamura Jr.
- Franco Mendiola Santos
- Luis Selepeo Tilipao

== Sailing ==
Northern Mariana Islands qualified 3 athletes in sailing:

Women

- Janet Lynn McCullough
- Emma Rose McCullough-Stearns

Men

- Anthony Richard Stearns

== Swimming ==
Northern Mariana Islands qualified 3 athletes in swimming:

Women

- Victoria Olegovna Chentsova
- Angel Felice Delos Santos De Jesus

Men

- Takumi Fukumoto Sugie

== Triathlon ==
Northern Mariana Islands qualified 2 athletes in triathlon:

Men

- Peter Balboni Prestley
- Anthony Richard Stearns
