= Ionatana Tino =

Samoa dual-code rugby international player

Personal information
- Full name: Ionatana Tino
- Born: 6 August 1990 (age 35) Samoa
- Height: 1.7 m (5 ft 7 in)
- Weight: 95 kg (14 st 13 lb)

Playing information

Rugby league
- Position: Hooker, Loose forward
Representative
Years	Team	Pld	T	G	FG	P
2013	Samoa	1	0	0	0	0

Rugby union
- Position: Halfback
Club
Years	Team	Pld	T	G	FG	P
2020–	Manuma Samoa
Representative
Years	Team	Pld	T	G	FG	P
2018–	Samoa	1				0
- Source: As of 27 September 2022

Ionatana Tino is a Samoan rugby league and rugby union footballer who represented Samoa in the 2013 World Cup.

== Playing career ==
A player for the Apia Barracudas in the Samoan local competition, Tino played for the Parkes Spacemen in the Group 11 Rugby League competition during the 2013 season.

In 2013, Tino was named in the Samoa squad for the World Cup.

He played for the Samoan rugby league nines side at the 2015 Pacific Games.
