= Mineral Resources Development Company =

Mineral Resources Development Company Limited (MRDC) was established in 1975 and is 100% owned by the Government of Papua New Guinea.

It was initially established as the State Nominee to acquire the State and Landowner equity interests in mining and petroleum projects and to manage the equity funds for landowner companies from the major resource development areas of PNG. However, the State's equity has since been transferred to Petromin PNG Holdings Ltd, so the focus of MRDC is now the management of the Landowner equity interests in both mining and petroleum projects.

MRDC is governed by a board of directors, which is chaired by Isacc Lupari by virtue of his position as 'Chief Secretary' of the State. Since March 2008, the Managing Director of MRDC has been Augustine Mano. In October 2011, Mano's appointment was terminated by acting Prime Minister Belden Namah, upon allegations that the MRDC had made improper investments under his management. However, Mano was reinstated a week later by Prime Minister Peter O'Neill.

== History ==
The major interests of MRDC were partially privatised in 1996, through the creation of Orogen Minerals, of which the MRDC holds a 51% controlling shareholding. In April 2002, Orogen merged with Oil Search (OS), but MRDC retained an 18.1% stake in the new company. OS was PNG's largest oil and gas producer.

MRDC was again restructured in 2007, with the formation of Petromin PNG Holdings Limited, which took control of the last State asset, the 20.5% equity interest in the Moran Petroleum Project. As a result of this restructuring, MRDC's chief role became the management of Landowner and Provincial Government interests.

== Investments and subsidiaries ==
MRDC's combined group investment portfolio increased from K678.95 million in 2007 to K1,021.7 billion in December 2010.

MRDC Group holds the following Interests of Landowners and Provincial Governments in Mining and Petroleum Projects in PNG.

=== Mining projects ===
Mineral Resources Star Mountains Ltd – 3.05% equity for Landowners Ok Tedi Mine

Mineral Resources Ok Tedi No. 2 Ltd – 3.05% equity for Fly River PG [Ok Tedi Mine]

Mineral Resources Enga Ltd – 5% equity for Enga PG & Landowners [Porgera Mine]

Mineral Resources Ramu Ltd – 2.5 equity % [Ramu Mine]

Mineral Resources Madang Ltd – 2.5% equity for Landowners [Ramu Mine]

=== Oil projects ===
Petroleum Resources Kutubu Ltd – 6.75% equity and 2% royalty [Kutubu Oil Project]

Petroleum Resources Gobe Ltd – 2% equity and 2% royalty [Gobe Oil Project]

Petroleum Resources Moran Ltd – 2% equity and 2% royalty [Moran Oil Project]

=== Gas projects (PNG LNG) ===
Gas Resources Gigira Ltd – 1.126503% equity and 2% royalty

Gas Resources Hides No. 4 Ltd – 0.225353% and 2% royalty

Gas Resources Juha No. 1 – Ltd – 0.132419% and 2% royalty

Gas Resources Angore Ltd – 0.132747% and 2% royalty

Petroleum Resources Kutubu Ltd – 1.143959% and 2% royalty

Petroleum Resources Gobe Ltd – 0.023671% and 2% royalty

Petroleum Resources Moran Ltd – 0.019874% and 2% royalty

Gas Resources North West Moran Ltd – 0.000482% equity and 2% royalty

Gas Resources Plant Ltd – 0.0448% and 2% royalty

Gas Resources Pipeline Ltd – 0.0448% and 2% royalty

== Controversies ==
In September 2011, Prime Minister Peter O'Neill directed the Attorney General Allan Marat to investigate allegations that the MDRC had squandered Landowners' monies through imprudent and improper investments. The allegations include the purchase of a 50% stake in a helicopter company for PGK70 million, which appeared to have an actual value of PGK30 million. The MDRC has denied any involvement in corrupt payments or deals.
