= Norfolk Island at the 2015 Pacific Games =

- IOC code: NFK

4 July 2015 – 18 July 2015
- Competitors: 13 in 4 sports
- Flag bearer: Kevin Coulter
- Medals Ranked 16th: Gold 2 Silver 3 Bronze 2 Total 7

Pacific Games appearances
- 1979; 1983; 1987; 1991; 1995; 1999; 2003; 2007; 2011; 2015; 2019; 2023

Norfolk Island competed at the 2015 Pacific Games in Port Moresby, Papua New Guinea from 4 to 18 July 2015. Norfolk Island listed 13 competitors as of 19 June 2015.

== Athletics ==
Norfolk Island qualified 1 athlete in track and field.

=== Women ===
Field events

Athlete	Event	Final	
Athlete	Event	Distance	Position
Brianna Stephens	Hammer throw	42.77	2nd place, silver medalist(s)

== Golf ==
Norfolk Island qualified 4 male golfers for the games.

Athlete	Event	Round 1	Round 2	Round 3	Round 4	Total		
Athlete	Event	Score	Score	Score	Score	Score	Par	Rank
Shane Evans	Men's individual	95	92	91	94	372		51
Scott Greenwood	Men's individual	93	86	91	95	365		50
Thomas Greenwood	Men's individual	83	84	83	90	340		37
Beau Magri	Men's individual	90	89	86	85	350		=41

== Lawn bowls ==
Norfolk Island has qualified 6 athletes.

- Tess Evans
- Ryan Dixon
- Matt Bigg
- Trev Gow
- Gary Bigg
- Phillip Jones

== Shooting ==
Norfolk Island has qualified 2 athletes.

Men

- Doug Creek – 10 m air pistol male, – 25 m pistol mixed.
- Kevin Coulter – 10 m air pistol male.
