= 2015 Pacific Games =

15th edition of the Pacific Games

XV Pacific Games
- Official logo of the Games
- Host city: Port Moresby
- Country: Papua New Guinea
- Nations: 24
- Athletes: 3,796
- Events: 299 in 28 sports
- Opening: 4 July 2015
- Closing: 18 July 2015
- Opened by: Prince Andrew, Duke of York
- Closed by: PGC President Vidhya Lakhan
- Athlete's Oath: Deslyn Siniu
- Judge's Oath: Susan Babao
- Torch lighter: Dika Toua
- Main venue: Sir John Guise Stadium

The 2015 Pacific Games (Tok Pisin: 2015 Pasifik Gems), officially the XV Pacific Games and also known as Port Moresby 2015 or POM 2015, was held in Port Moresby, Papua New Guinea, from 4 to 18 July 2015. It was the fifteenth staging of the Pacific Games as well as the third to be hosted in Port Moresby.

More than 3,700 athletes from the 22 Pacific Games Associations plus first time entrants Australia and New Zealand, took part. With almost 300 sets of medals, the games featured 28 sports, 19 of which are on the 2016 Summer Olympics program. Only men's football was a straight qualifying event for Rio 2016. These sporting events took place in 14 venues in the host city.

The host nation, Papua New Guinea, topped the medal table for only the second time, winning the most golds (88) and most medals overall (217). New Caledonia finished second making it only the third time the French territory had failed to place first. Tahiti finished third. Tuvalu won its first ever gold medal at the games, and the debuting teams from Australia and New Zealand won their first Pacific Games medals including gold.

== Host selection ==
Five Pacific Island countries expressed interests in hosting the fifteenth edition of the games as soon as the bidding process began. They were American Samoa, Papua New Guinea, Solomon Islands, Tonga, and Vanuatu. By March 2009, only three were serious bidders – Papua New Guinea, Solomon Islands, and Tonga. On 20 September 2009, the Solomon Islands National Olympic Committee President – Fred Maetoloa, in a press statement announced the withdrawal of the Solomons bid following the withdrawal of the Solomon Island government's commitment and support.

On 27 September 2009, the Pacific Games Council, at its meeting coinciding with the 2009 Pacific Mini Games, elected Port Moresby, Papua New Guinea as the host of the 2015 Games. The final vote was 25–22 in favor of Port Moresby over Tonga to host.

2015 Pacific Games bidding results
| City | PGA | Final Votes |
| Port Moresby | Papua New Guinea | 25 |
| Nukuʻalofa | Tonga | 22 |

== Development and preparation ==
Preparations for the Games, which Port Moresby was given the honor of hosting in 2009, have taken longer than many had anticipated. The country's ability to host the event in time was uncertain in 2011, according to the PNG Pacific Games organizers. To evaluate the level of the games' preparation, Pacific Games Council President Vidhya Lakhan traveled to Port Moresby on April 26, 2012. On May 2, Lakhan made the announcement that Papua New Guinea will continue to serve as the 2015 Pacific Games host after a week-long presentation by the PNG Pacific Games Venue, Infrastructure and Equipment Committee (VIEC).

=== Venues and infrastructure ===
A total of 14 venues hosted 28 sports in Port Moresby.

Competition venues
| Venue | Sports | Capacity |
|---|---|---|
| Sir John Guise Stadium | Athletics (track and field); Rugby sevens Rugby league nines | 15,000 |
| Sir John Guise Sports Complex (outdoor) | Beach Volleyball; Field Hockey | |
| Sir John Guise Stadium (indoor) | Basketball (finals); Netball; Powerlifting; Weightlifting | 2,000 |
| Port Moresby Racquets Club | Squash; Tennis | 1,000 |
| Taurama Aquatic Centre | Swimming | 2,000 |
| Taurama Indoor Centre | Basketball (preliminary rounds); Karate; Taekwondo; Volleyball | 2,500 |
| Bisini Parade Sports Complex | Cricket; Lawn bowls Football (Preliminary rounds); Softball; Touch rugby | 10,000 |
| Royal Port Moresby Golf Club | Golf | |
| Ela Beach and PNGDF Naval Base | Va'a; Triathlon (swimming) | |
| Royal Papua Yacht Club (Fairfax Harbour) | Sailing | |
| Caritas Technical Secondary School Gym | Body building Boxing; Table Tennis | 1,100 |
| June Valley Shooting Range | Shooting | 500 |
| Sir Hubert Murray Stadium | Football (finals); Triathlon (finish) | 20,477 |

=== Sports Complex ===
There were two major sporting complexes that played host to many sports. The Sir John Guise complex which hosted nine different sporting codes namely Weightlifting, Powerlifting, Rugby 7s, Rugby league nines, beach volleyball, field hockey, and Athletics. The Bisini Parade Sports Complex was the other sports complex that hosted football, cricket, softball, Touch rugby and lawn bowls.

=== Games baton ===
The 2015 Pacific Games baton was revealed on 23 February 2015 in Port Moresby. The baton was designed and created by Gickmai Kundun, a well known local artist from the Simbu Province. Shaped as an hourglass, the baton depicts a kundu drum which traditionally is used as a communication tool. It (baton) is made out of one of Papua New Guinea's major resource commodity, copper. Kundun said the purpose of the games baton was to unite the people of Papua New Guinea, and the kundu drum was the perfect fit.

Games baton relay

On 25 March 2015, in Port Moresby, the Prime Minister of Papua New Guinea, Hon. Peter O'Neill formally launched the Games baton relay. The journey started on March 26 to officially celebrate exactly 100 days till the opening ceremony. Over 150 remote villages, as well as all 22 cities and towns in the 22 provinces, were visited by the baton's tour. The baton paid a special visit to Cairns, Australia, on June 20 to give the sizable Papua New Guinean community a chance to see it firsthand. The relay proceeded for the following five days when the baton landed in the National Capital District (the host province) on June 29.

The baton ended its journey at the opening ceremony on 4 July 2015, where Olympian and Commonwealth weightlifting champion Dika Toua took to the heights of the Sir John Guise Stadium to light the Games Cauldron.

=== Volunteers ===
From over 6,000 volunteer applications received by the chief executive officer for the 2015 games, only 3,500 of this applicants were carefully screened and handpicked during the recruitment phase. The 3,500 volunteers were then divided into 175 teams that worked throughout the games in key functional areas such as games village operations, transport, technology, logistics and translators etc.

== The Games ==
The official dates of the 2015 Pacific Games were July 4 to 18, however, competitions for Basketball, Football, Table tennis, and Touch rugby began on July 3 (one day earlier).

=== Sports ===
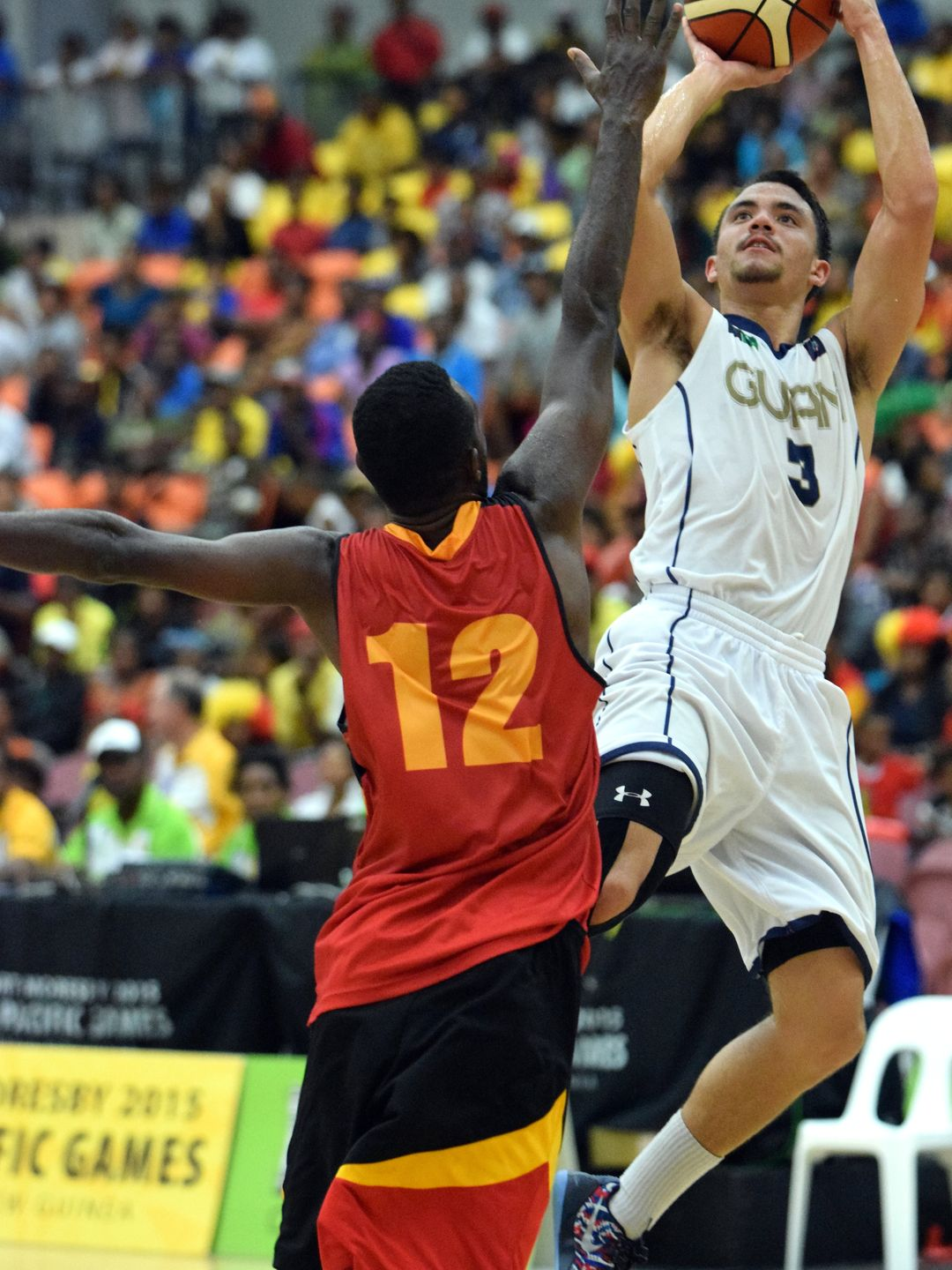
Kyle Husslein playing basketball for Guam at the 2015 Pacific Games

There were 28 sports featured at the 2015 Pacific Games.

- Athletics (48)
- Basketball (2)
- Beach volleyball (2)
- Bodybuilding (12)
- Boxing (13)
- Cricket (2)
- Field hockey (2)
- Football (2)
- Golf (4)
- Karate (15)
- Lawn bowls (8)
- Netball (1)
- Outrigger canoeing (12)
- Powerlifting (15)
- Rugby league nines (1)
- Rugby sevens (2)
- Sailing (6)
- Shooting (11)
- Softball (1)
- Squash (7)
- Swimming (35)
- Table tennis (11)
- Taekwondo (16)
- Tennis (7)
- Touch rugby (3)
- Triathlon (2)
- Volleyball (2)
- Weightlifting (45)
Note: A number in parentheses indicates how many medal events were contested in that sport.

=== Participating countries ===
A total of 24 countries took part in the 2015 Pacific Games. This was with the inclusion of Australia and New Zealand for the first time in the history of the Games. The two countries were invited to participate in four sports; sailing, taekwondo, rugby sevens and weightlifting.

The Pacific Games Council said in July 2014 that the participation of the two countries would improve the quality of competition in the Pacific Games. The inclusion of Australia and New Zealand was on a trial basis, with a review scheduled after the Games to determine its success.

Participating Pacific Games Associations (PGA)
- American Samoa (91)
- Australia (43)
- Cook Islands (132)
- Federated States of Micronesia (44)
- Fiji (481)
- Guam (148)
- Kiribati (86)
- Marshall Islands (10)
- Nauru (130)
- New Caledonia (354)
- New Zealand (49)
- Niue (22)
- Norfolk Island (13)
- Northern Mariana Islands (26)
- Palau (14)
- Papua New Guinea (625) (host)
- Samoa (405)
- Solomon Islands (287)
- Tahiti (273)
- Tokelau (1)
- Tonga (236)
- Tuvalu (101)
- Vanuatu (161)
- Wallis and Futuna (64)

Note: A number in parentheses indicates how many athletes were registered prior to the Games, with that number expected to diminish by the Games' start. Clicking on the number will take you to a page on that nation's delegation to the 2015 Games.

=== Calendar ===
The following table provides a summary of the competition schedule.

All dates are Papua New Guinea Time (UTC+10)

| OC | Opening ceremony | ● | Event competitions | ● | Olympic qualifying finals | 1 | Event finals | CC | Closing ceremony |

| July | 3 Fri | 4 Sat | 5 Sun | 6 Mon | 7 Tue | 8 Wed | 9 Thu | 10 Fri | 11 Sat | 12 Sun | 13 Mon | 14 Tue | 15 Wed | 16 Thu | 17 Fri | 18 Sat | Events |
|---|---|---|---|---|---|---|---|---|---|---|---|---|---|---|---|---|---|
| Ceremonies | | OC | | | | | | | | | | | | | | CC | |
| Athletics | | | | | | | | | | | 5 | 11 | 7 | 14 | 9 | 2 | 48 |
| Basketball | ● | ● | ● | ● | ● | ● | ● | ● | ● | 2 | | | | | | | 2 |
| Beach volleyball | | | | | | | | | | | ● | ● | ● | ● | ● | 2 | 2 |
| Bodybuilding | | | | | | | | | | | 12 | | | | | | 12 |
| Boxing | | | | | | | | | | | | ● | ● | ● | 3 | 10 | 13 |
| Cricket | | | | ● | ● | | ● | ● | 1 | | ● | ● | ● | | ● | 1 | 2 |
| Field hockey | | | | | | | | | | | ● | ● | | ● | ● | 2 | 2 |
| Football | ● | | ● | ● | ● | ● | | ● | ● | ● | ● | | ● | 1 | 1 | | 2 |
| Golf | | | | | | | | | | | | | ● | ● | ● | 4 | 4 |
| Karate | | | | | | | | | | | 10 | 7 | | | | | 17 |
| Lawn bowls | | | | | | | | | | | ● | ● | 4 | ● | ● | 4 | 8 |
| Netball | | | | | | | | | | | ● | ● | ● | ● | ● | 1 | 1 |
| Outrigger canoeing | | | | 4 | 4 | | | 2 | 2 | | | | | | | | 12 |
| Powerlifting | | | | | | | ● | 15 | | | | | | | | | 15 |
| Rugby league nines | | | | | | | | | ● | 1 | | | | | | | 1 |
| Rugby sevens | | | | | | ● | ● | 2 | | | | | | | | | 2 |
| Sailing | | | | ● | ● | ● | ● | ● | 6 | | | | | | | | 6 |
| Shooting | | | | 2 | 2 | 1 | 2 | 1 | 3 | | | | | | | | 11 |
| Softball | | | | | | | | | | | | | ● | ● | 1 | | 1 |
| Squash | | | | ● | ● | ● | 2 | ● | ● | | ● | 2 | ● | 2 | 1 | | 7 |
| Swimming | | | | 7 | 6 | 7 | 7 | 6 | 7 | 2 | | | | | | | 42 |
| Table tennis | ● | ● | ● | 2 | ● | 5 | 2 | 2 | | | | | | | | | 11 |
| Taekwondo | | | | | | | | | | | | | | 8 | 8 | 2 | 18 |
| Tennis | | | | ● | ● | ● | 2 | ● | ● | | ● | ● | ● | 3 | 2 | | 7 |
| Touch rugby | ● | ● | ● | ● | 2 | ● | ● | 1 | | | | | | | | | 3 |
| Triathlon | | | 3 | | | | | | | | | | | | | | 3 |
| Volleyball | | | | | | | | | ● | ● | ● | ● | ● | ● | ● | 2 | 2 |
| Weightlifting | | | 12 | 12 | 12 | 9 | | | | | | | | | | | 45 |
| Total events | | | 15 | 27 | 26 | 22 | 15 | 29 | 19 | 5 | 27 | 29 | 11 | 28 | 25 | 30 | 299 |
| Cumulative total | | | 15 | 42 | 68 | 90 | 105 | 134 | 153 | 158 | 185 | 205 | 216 | 244 | 269 | 299 | 299 |
| July | Fri 3 | Sat 4 | Sun 5 | Mon 6 | Tue 7 | Wed 8 | Thu 9 | Fri 10 | Sat 11 | Sun 12 | Mon 13 | Tue 14 | Wed 15 | Thu 16 | Fri 17 | Sat 18 | Events |

=== Medal table ===
Host nation Papua New Guinea topped the overall medal table for only the second time ever. It was also the third Pacific Games in history where New Caledonia had failed to finish first.

* Host nation (Papua New Guinea)

2015 Pacific Games medal table
| Rank | Nation | Gold | Silver | Bronze | Total |
|---|---|---|---|---|---|
| 1 | Papua New Guinea* | 88 | 69 | 60 | 217 |
| 2 | New Caledonia | 59 | 50 | 57 | 166 |
| 3 | Tahiti | 39 | 34 | 40 | 113 |
| 4 | Fiji | 33 | 44 | 37 | 114 |
| 5 | Samoa | 17 | 23 | 11 | 51 |
| 6 | Australia | 17 | 19 | 11 | 47 |
| 7 | Nauru | 7 | 10 | 5 | 22 |
| 8 | Solomon Islands | 7 | 6 | 15 | 28 |
| 9 | Tonga | 7 | 1 | 9 | 17 |
| 10 | Cook Islands | 6 | 7 | 16 | 29 |
| 11 | Guam | 3 | 3 | 7 | 13 |
| 12 | Kiribati | 3 | 1 | 5 | 9 |
| 13 | American Samoa | 3 | 1 | 4 | 8 |
| 14 | Federated States of Micronesia | 3 | 1 | 0 | 4 |
| 15 | Vanuatu | 2 | 8 | 12 | 22 |
| 16 | Norfolk Island | 2 | 3 | 2 | 7 |
| 17 | New Zealand | 1 | 9 | 10 | 20 |
| 18 | Wallis and Futuna | 1 | 1 | 5 | 7 |
| 19 | Tuvalu | 1 | 0 | 3 | 4 |
| 20 | Niue | 0 | 1 | 1 | 2 |
| 20 | Palau | 0 | 1 | 1 | 2 |
| 22 | Marshall Islands | 0 | 0 | 5 | 5 |
| 23 | Northern Mariana Islands | 0 | 0 | 0 | 0 |
| 23 | Tokelau | 0 | 0 | 0 | 0 |
| Totals (24 entries) | | 299 | 292 | 316 | 907 |

== Ceremonies ==
=== Opening ceremony ===
The opening ceremony was held at the Sir John Guise Stadium in Port Moresby, Papua New Guinea, between 18:00 and 22:00 (GMT+10), on 4 July 2015. The Head of the Commonwealth and Queen of Papua New Guinea, Queen Elizabeth II, was represented by her son, Prince Andrew, Duke of York. Airleke Ingram was its artistic director, with executive producer being Merryn Hughes from the Makoda Productions. Live musical performers included Jamie-Lee Chan, Jagarizzar, with Ngaire Joseph, and duo group Twin Tribe who performed Winds of Change as the closing act. A special performance by Sir George Telek and a medley from Papua New Guinea's all-time music greats - the Paramana Strangers, Pati Potts Doi, and Tom Larry.

==== Parade of nations ====
As per games tradition, each PGA paraded into the arena for the opening ceremony with each delegation being led by a flag bearer from their respective teams. Following tradition, the host of the previous games, New Caledonia, enters first followed by the rest of the participating PGA's in alphabetical order. The host nation of Papua New Guinea enters last. Each nation was preceded by a placard bearer carrying a sign with the country's name.

Below is a list of parading countries and their announced flag bearer, in the same order as the parade. This is sortable by country name, flag bearer's name, or flag bearer's sport.

| Order | Nation | Flag bearer | Sport |
|---|---|---|---|
| 1 | New Caledonia | | |
| 2 | American Samoa | | |
| 3 | Australia | Nicole Beck | Rugby sevens |
| 4 | Cook Islands | Tereapii Tapoki | Athletics |
| 5 | Federated States of Micronesia | Manuel Minginfel | Weightlifting |
| 6 | Fiji | Apolonia Vaivai | Weightlifting |
| 7 | Guam | Jagger Stephens | Swimming |
| 8 | Kiribati | David Katoatao | Weightlifting |
| 9 | Marshall Islands | Mathlynn Robert-Sasser | Weightlifting |
| 10 | Nauru | Itte Detenamo | Weightlifting |
| 11 | New Zealand | Tracey Lambrechs | Weightlifting |
| 12 | Niue | | |
| 13 | Norfolk Island | Kevin Coulter | Shooting |
| 14 | Northern Mariana Islands | | |
| 15 | Palau | Stevick Patris | Weightlifting |
| 16 | Samoa | Ele Opeloge | Weightlifting |
| 17 | Solomon Islands | Jenly Tegu Wini | Weightlifting |
| 18 | Tahiti | Hititua Taerea | Va'a |
| 18 | Tahiti | Maea Lextret | Basketball |
| 19 | Tokelau | Volunteer | n/a |
| 20 | Tonga | | |
| 21 | Tuvalu | | |
| 22 | Vanuatu | Cyril Jacobe | Tennis |
| 23 | Wallis and Futuna | | |
| 24 | Papua New Guinea | Linda Pulsan | Powerlifting |

=== Closing ceremony ===
The closing ceremony was held at Sir John Guise Stadium on Saturday 18 July 2015 and was produced by Makoda Productions. Papua New Guinean music stars Jay Lieasi, Jamie-Lee Chan, duo group Twin Tribe, and Moses Tau were among the opening acts of the ceremony. Pacific Games Council President Vidhya Lakhan passed the Pacific Games flag to Nuku'alofa, Tonga, host of the 2019 Games, and declared the XV Pacific Games closed. Closing performances followed with 2015 PNG Musik Awards Artist of the Year Anslom singing his hit song “Can’t Lie”, while other performers included American-Samoan reggae vocalist J Boog, Fijian hip-hop star George FIJI, PNG-American reggae musician O-Shen, and PNG's local icon and ARIA Music Awards winner George Telek, MBE.

== Marketing ==
Tura the Kokomo

=== Mascot ===
The official mascot for the 2015 games, 'Tura the Kokomo', was designed by a 13-year-old boy named Taka Seigori from Tubusereia, a motuan village - located 30 minutes drive from Port Moresby. 'Tura the Kokomo' depicts a modern, cheeky and funny Hornbill - known in Papua New Guinea as a 'Kokomo'. The bird is known to possess the attributes of friendliness and cheekiness. Colours seen on the crown of 'Tura the Kokomo' are the colours of the 2015 Pacific Games logo.

=== Sponsors ===
| Official Games Sponsor | Bank South Pacific (BSP) |
| Games Baton Relay Sponsor | Oil Search |
| Platinum Sponsors | OK Tedi Mining, Telikom PNG, PNG Power, National Gaming Control Board (NGCB), Puma Energy, SP Brewery |
| Gold Sponsors | MRDC, Daltron, Brian Bell Homecentres, Applus Velosi, Fuji Xerox, Air Niugini, Petromin PNG Holdings Limited, Emtek Multimedia, Coca-Cola, Steamships |
| Silver Sponsors | Moore Printing, Hertz, MMI Pacific Insurance |
| Supporting Sponsor | PNG Ports |

== See also ==
- 2016 Summer Olympics
- 2017 Asian Indoor and Martial Arts Games
- 2017 Pacific Mini Games
- 2018 Commonwealth Games

== Notes ==
^a Athletics: The total of 48 events contested in 2015 included four parasport events: Men's shot put – secured throw, women's shot put – ambulatory, men's javelin – ambulatory, and men's 100m – ambulatory.

^b Boxing: Women's events were included for 2015. The weight classes used by the IOC, i.e. flyweight (48–51 kg), lightweight (57–60 kg), and middleweight (69–75 kg) were added to the schedule. There were ten weight classes for men.

^c Football: Men's tournament had eight teams (including New Zealand) and the women's had seven teams. Both were qualification events for the 2016 Summer Olympics.

^d Karate: The Kumite tournament included six weight divisions for men and five for women. The schedule also included individual and team Kata events for men and women.

^e Men's softball was not able to be included in the program as the sport did not meet the criterion of the Pacific Games charter requiring nominations for the event from at least six countries. Women's softball was included.

^f Swimming: The schedule for Taurama Pool included 40 events; 19 for men, 19 for women, and two mixed team relays. The open water swim also included a men's event and a women's event.

^g Table tennis: The total of 11 events contested in 2015 included four parasport events: Men's singles – seated, women's singles – seated, men's singles – ambulatory, and women's singles – ambulatory.

^h Weightlifting: The total of 45 events contested in 2015 was split into 15 weight classes (eight for men and seven for women) with three sets of medals awarded (for the snatch, clean and jerk, and combined total) in each class.

== Sources ==
- 2015 Pacific Games Results (PDF 39.7 MB). Oceania Sport Information Centre (Report). Archived from the original on 13 January 2016.
