= Samoa at the 2015 Pacific Games =

- IOC code: SAM

4 July 2015 – 18 July 2015
- Competitors: 405 in 19 sports
- Flag bearer: Ele Opeloge
- Medals Ranked 5th: Gold 17 Silver 23 Bronze 11 Total 51

Pacific Games appearances
- 1963; 1966; 1969; 1971; 1975; 1979; 1983; 1987; 1991; 1995; 1999; 2003; 2007; 2011; 2015; 2019; 2023

Samoa competed at the 2015 Pacific Games in Port Moresby, Papua New Guinea from 4 to 18 July 2015. Samoa listed 405 competitors as of 4 July 2015. Eight competitors were qualified in two sports. (Note: Grace Lina Leo, Ioane Lesoa and Kristal Vaiauau Faamatuainu qualified in volleyball and beach volleyball. Faletuluia-Ale-Taofia Iosefa and Faalele Iosua were qualified in rugby sevens and rugby league nines. Fila Fuamatu was qualified in powerlifting and touch rugby. Rowena Faaiuaso and Seifono Misili were qualified in rugby sevens and touch rugby.) The Pacific Games serve as a crucial multi-sport event that not only fosters athletic excellence but also strengthens regional identity and cultural exchange among the participating Pacific Island nations.

== Athletics ==
Samoa qualified 5 athletes in track and field:

Women

- Kasandra Salamasina Le Tafaifa Vegas

Men

- Tutaia Galoiola
- Alexander Rose
- Siologa Viliamu Sepa
- Shaka Sola

=== Parasport ===
Women

- Maggie Kolopa Aiono

Men

- Alefosio Laki
- Milo Toleafoa

== Basketball ==
Samoa qualified a men's team in basketball (12 players):

Men

- Euta Ezra Collins
- Ezra Pama Tufuga
- Joshua Lafoai
- Ratu Epeli Tabualili Levy
- Theodore Lorenzo Jr. McFarland
- Ryan Paia
- Meki Purcell
- Ene Togia
- Mahonri Tufuga
- Sapeti Mumaleaute Tufuga
- Marquise Cannan Vaili
- Iopu Muliaga

== Beach volleyball ==
Samoa qualified men's and women's teams in beach volleyball:

Women

- Kristal Vaiauau Faamatuainu
- Grace Lina Leo

Men

- Damaris Amerika
- Ioane Lesoa
- Toetu Toetu
- Eneliko Tui
- Lomitusi Ulu

== Boxing ==
Samoan athletes qualified in boxing include:

Men

- Faamanu Aukuso
- Livai Faasala
- Samuelu Faialaga
- Aukusitino Faofua
- Filimaua Hala
- Ropati Hall
- Kaisa Ioane
- Afaese Hugo Fata Kalepi
- Vaimoli Kuresa
- Andrew Leuii
- Paddy Junior Leuii
- Petelo Matagi
- Nelson Meleisea
- Fifita Mosese Pousoo

== Cricket ==
Samoa qualified a women's cricket team (13 players):

Women

- Meretiana Via Andrew
- Lelia Anne Bourne
- Taalili Iosefo
- Taofi Lafai
- Regina Sela Monika Lilii
- Perelini Mulitalo
- Sinei Mulivai
- Marita Paulo
- Feala Pula
- Lagi Otila Telea
- Moelagi Jessie Tuilagi
- Nathalie Victoria Tuilagi
- Matile Uliao

== Football ==
Samoa qualified a women's football team (19 players):

Women

- Lagi Akari
- Josephine Sina Ane
- Yvonne Frances-Maria Ane
- Monique Fischer
- Jullyn Gasio
- Hilda Hellesoe
- Salaevalu Ikenasio
- Lusia Ioane
- Kelsey Tausala Kapisi
- Lelava Seutatia Laupepa
- Rosei Leota
- Soti Letoa
- Hazel Peleti
- Faanunu Ropeti
- Olga Sagatu
- Shontelle Stevens
- Chelsea Strickland
- Faagi Talosia Lima
- Hana Malo Vaga

== Golf ==
Women

- Olive Auvaa

Men

- Robert Aipopo Faaaliga
- Otane Faatupu
- Uitualagi Laauli
- Malase Maifea
- Ropati Matulino
- Leleaga M M James Meredith
- Timoteo Samau
- Niko Vui
- Van Wright

== Netball ==
Samoa qualified a netball team (initial squad of 18 players):

Women

- Tietie Aiolupotea
- Natalie Taamorangi Kehuroa Jones
- Opheira Henrietta Karatau
- Temukisa Leuluai
- Gloria Joyvita Namulauulu
- Jennifer Naoupu
- Julianna Naoupu
- Grete Lynn Nuralli
- Sanonu Katalina Robertson
- Nicolette Velma Zandee Ropati
- Seiafi Saiaulama Sapolu
- Alana May Schuster
- Auteletoa Tanimo
- Elizabeth Lage Ene Taulelei
- Hanalei Natalia Eseta Temese
- Sanita Anastasia Too
- Betty Vaivasa Vitolina Tito Tuipulotu
- Brooke Amber Williams

== Powerlifting ==
Samoa qualified 9 athletes in powerlifting:

Women

- Fila Fuamatu (84 kg) –
- Vanessa Lui (72 kg) – 4th
- Matile Sitagata (+84 kg) – She set a new open and junior world record in the deadlift with 237.5 kg as well as junior total world record with 550.5 kg.

Men

- Oliva Siusega Kirisome (+120 kg) –
- Tavita Lipine (120 kg)
- Emau Manusamoa (+120 kg) – 4th
- Ofisa Junior Ofisa (93 kg) –
- Mikaele Pasuo (83 kg) – 4th
- Koale Junior Taala (105 kg) –

== Rugby league nines ==
Samoa qualified a rugby league nines team (initial squad of 41 players):

Men

- Nissan Aitui
- Alesana Richard Anae
- Fred Fatuomanu Apulu
- Talitonu Faapuea
- Tautua Faauila
- Emile Fanene
- David Fetalaiga
- Ramon Steve Max Filipine
- Jonathan Finauga Fruean
- Joseph Fuimaono
- Faleniu Iosi
- Faalele Iosua
- Gordon Teofilo Lemisio
- John Faausuusu Kasiano Lemisio
- Faafouina Loau
- Arden Teti Meihana McCarthy
- Fosi Nuusavili Melville McCarthy
- Tony Muagututia
- Tanielu Pasene
- Herman Olaf Retzlaff
- Leia Saofaiga
- Malo Solomona
- Saula Solomona
- Henry Suauu
- Silao Talimalo
- Silao Talimao
- Mikaele Tapili
- Ionatana Tino
- Logofaalii Toa
- Pousea Arasile Michael Tofilau
- Onopene Tuaia
- Mikaele Uati Uati
- Uati Mikaele Uati
- Sun Ulula
- Ponifasio Vasa
- Laneselota Taitaifono Veve
- Albert Satupaitea Viali
- Aotealofa Jaeden Tuimavave Wines
- Arnold Joseph Meredith
- Arthur Rudolf Meredith
- Faletuluia-Ale-Taofia Iosefa

== Rugby sevens ==
Women

5th – Women's tournament.

- Apaula Enesi
- Vanessa Afamasaga
- Mellisha Leaana
- Maria Jacinta Ausai
- Virginia Iona Sofara
- Suititi Ailaoa
- Soteria Pulumu
- Seifono Misili
- Tina Jones
- Pepe Mataipule
- Tafale Roma Malesi

Men

– Men's tournament.

== Sailing ==
Samoa qualified one athlete in sailing:

Women

- Bianca Leilua

== Shooting ==
Samoa qualified 11 athletes in shooting:

Men

- David Anthony Asi
- Nicholas Caffelli
- Francis Cafferelli
- Ioane Sakaria Galuvao
- Toddystanley Iosefa
- Siegfried Levi
- Paul Roy Cheetah Loibl
- Robert Wayne Maskell
- Salale Moananu
- Eddie Pengcheng Chan Pao
- Raymond Pesamino Pereira

== Swimming ==
Samoa qualified one athlete in swimming:

Men

- Brandon Schuster

== Tennis ==
Samoa qualified 7 athletes in tennis:

Women

- Steffi Carruthers

Men

- Harley Cronin
- Usufono Fepuleai
- Tautuimoana Victory Leavai
- Sauleone Anasis Saipele
- Leon Soonalole
- Marvin Soonalole

== Touch rugby ==
Samoa qualified men's and women's teams in touch rugby (28 athletes):

Women

– Women's tournament.

- Miriama Lote Lima
- Alofa Latafale Auvaa
- Filoi Fatima Eneliko
- Lerissa Violina Fong
- Felicity Pogi
- Mandria Angelic Natalie Sua
- Rowena Faaiuaso
- Celeste Faletaulupe Solofa
- Anna Maria Schuster
- Gabrielle Fuatino Apelu
- Eden Yandall
- Vai Leota
- Lepailetai Maria Faaiuaso
- Sabrina Hemara Reupena

Men

– Men's tournament.

- Sapati Gautasi
- Alex Vaauliafa Iii Mikaele
- Michael James Bernard Rasmussen
- Peter Manuleavi Hazelman
- Darren Aofia
- Rapi Laauli Vaai
- Eteuati Togiatomai
- Jesse Leituvae
- Andrew Elisara
- Gregory Ualivi Hazelman
- Samoauatasi Tolovaa Siilata
- Laumata Msala Laumata
- David (DJ) Fong
- Tasi Cortdz

== Volleyball ==
Samoa qualified men's and women's volleyball teams:

Women

- Kristal Vaiauau Faamatuainu
- Mavaega Falefata
- Margie Fitu
- Mowenna Christina Huch
- Gillian Kiripati
- Tolotea Lealoaina Lealamanua
- Grace Lina Leo
- Taulaga Sulu Malaitai
- Theresa Taililino Malaitai
- Lilly Mauafu
- Elena Mika
- Adrianna Katrina Seufatu
- Faatali Talimalosoo
- Tamara Taviuni
- Emalini Toleafoa
- Leute Mataipule Tuugamusu

Men

- Lauina Aisaka
- Etuale Eteuati
- Jim Kiteau
- Ioane Lesoa
- Vea Junior Sepulona
- Ioane Talalelei Gago
- Talalelei Talalelei
- Francis Uso

== Weightlifting ==
Samoa qualified 8 athletes in weightlifting:

Women

- Vanessa Lui (69 kg)
- Ele Opeloge (75+kg)
- Mary Opeloge (75 kg)

Men

- Vaipava Nevo Ioane (62 kg)
- Siaosi Leuo (94 kg)
- Lauititi Lui (105+kg)
- Petunu Opeloge (85 kg)
- Patrick Pasia (69 kg)
