= Guam at the 2015 Pacific Games =

- IOC code: GUM

4 July 2015 – 18 July 2015
- Competitors: 148 in 15 sports
- Flag bearer: Jagger Stephens
- Medals Ranked 11th: Gold 3 Silver 3 Bronze 7 Total 13

Pacific Games appearances
- 1966; 1969; 1971; 1975; 1979; 1983; 1987; 1991; 1995; 1999; 2003; 2007; 2011; 2015; 2019; 2023

Guam competed at the 2015 Pacific Games in Port Moresby, Papua New Guinea from 4 to 18 July 2015. Guam listed 148 competitors as of 4 July 2015.

== Athletics ==
Guam qualified one athlete in track and field:

Men

- Justin Michael Barcinas Andre

== Basketball ==
Guam qualified men's and women's teams in basketball (28 athletes):

Women

- Kali Lauren Benavente
- Brianna Veronica Calvo Benito
- Charrisse Rose Aquino Bolabola
- Alina Flores Bonto
- Destiny Rae Castro
- Kathryn Krystle Castro
- Joylyn Ollet Pangilinan
- April Pardilla
- Crystal Pardilla
- Emily Pardilla
- Jocelyn Labordo Pardilla
- Maree Rose Cruz Pelkey
- Sonja Maria Sanchez
- Derin Joy Santos

Men

The gold medal-winning squad at the 2015 Pacific Games:

Guam men's national basketball team roster
Players
Coaches

| Pos. | No. | Name | Age – Date of birth | Height | Club |
|---|---|---|---|---|---|---|
| | 1 | John Chaco | – |
| | 2 | James Stake | – |
| G | 3 | Kyle Husslein | 19 – November 6, 1995 | 6 ft 2 in (1.88 m) | University of Redlands | (United States) |
| F | 5 | Michael Sakazaki | 20 – March 29, 1995 | 6 ft 5 in (1.96 m) | Chaminade Silverswords | (United States) |
| G | 10 | William Stinnett (C) | – | 6 ft 3 in (1.91 m) |
| | 11 | Seve Susuico | – |
| G/F | 12 | Joseph Blas | – | 6 ft 3 in (1.91 m) |
| | 13 | Jesus Cruz | – |
| | 14 | Reggie Rechebong | – |
| G | 15 | Vincent Estella | – | 6 ft 1 in (1.85 m) |
| F | 33 | Jonathan Galloway | – | 6 ft 10 in (2.08 m) | UC Irvine Anteaters men's basketball | (United States) |
| F | 42 | Tai Wesley | 29 – May 13, 1986 | 6 ft 7 in (2.01 m) | Southland Sharks | (Australia) |

Head coach

- (Guam) Edward Calvo

Legend

- Club – describes last
  club before the tournament
- Age – describes age
  on 20 August 2015

== Beach volleyball ==
Guam qualified men's and women's teams in beach volleyball (7 athletes):

Women

- Kendra Celena Byrd
- Kara Nichole Guerrero
- Tatiana Afalava Sablan

Men

- Ookkrit (Jimmy) Boonprakong
- Ryan Kevin V. Eugenio
- Shintaro Okada
- Christopher Lee Shepherd

== Boxing ==
Guam qualified 2 athletes in boxing:

Women

- Gianna Sarusal

Men

- Adrienne Laurence Panlilio Francisco

== Golf ==
Guam qualified 7 athletes in golf:

Women

- Teresita Manabo Blair
- Emiri Satake
- Kalina Mia Satake

Men

- Bruce Arizobal Estrada III
- Jimmy Lawrence Duenas Mafnas
- John Anthony Blas Muna
- Louie Jose Sunga

== Outrigger canoeing ==
Guam qualified 26 athletes in va'a:

Women

- Analisa Santos Almazan
- Kamaka Moylan Alston
- Maribeth Balidio Benavente
- Rosemarie Bell Camacho
- Liana Lynn Galvez Delos Trinos
- Francine Nicole Galao
- Elizabeth Dupuluar Lubuag
- Odessa Maureen Martinez
- Beatrice Delin Sahagon Mata
- Nicole Marie Murphy
- Patrina Ann Perez
- Thelma Reyes Soriano

Men

- Carl Joseph Aguon Jr.
- Jonathan Paul Buasuwan
- Christian Anne Jimena Carreon
- Bonn Bryan Apelo Delos Trinos
- Brandon Joseph Delgado Hernandez
- Ian Roque Perez Iriarte
- Eric John Mendiola
- Thomas Carl Johnson Mendiola
- Adam James Cariaso Palomo
- Johnny Cariaso Palomo
- Michael Steven Pangelinan Jr.
- Michael Steven Pangelinan
- Arthur Thomas Tedtaotao Taimanglo
- Richard Eugene Valentine III

== Rugby sevens ==
Guam qualified a men's rugby sevens team (13 players)

Men

- Gerard Joseph Aguon
- Johnny Benjamin Quitigua Borja
- Edward Gerard Sonido Calvo
- Vinson Calvo
- Paul Anthony Eustaquio
- Robert James Leon Guerrero
- Jesse Fontino Andrew Perez
- Sixto Aguon Quintanilla III
- Brian Kevin Murphy Ramiro
- Ezra Brown Sablan
- Christopher Peter Sgro
- Matthew Eduardo Sgro
- Christopher Ryan Blaz Wintterle

== Shooting ==
Guam qualified 10 athletes in shooting:

Women

- Erika Takahashi Camacho
- Maria Teresa B Cenzon-Duenas
- Hope Florice Marie Delos Reyes
- Amalia Concepcion Cenzon Duenas – 10 m air pistol female.
- Daena Joan Taitague Mansapit

Men

- Ricardo Jose Duenas
- Adrian Tano Mora
- Louis John Paulino
- Richard Daniel Paulino Jr
- Valentino Gregg Perez

== Swimming ==
Guam qualified 8 athletes in swimming:

Women

- Mineri Kurotori Gomez
- Amanda Joy Poppe
- Pilar Celina Taitano Shimizu

Men

- Christopher Jude Mesa Duenas
- Tommy Joe Imazu
- Tanner Joel Poppe
- Benjamin Anthony Aguon Schulte
- Jagger Kealohilani Cruz Stephens

== Taekwondo ==
Guam qualified 3 athletes in taekwondo:

Women

- Amber Elizabeth Garrido Toves

Men

- Alexander Xavier Gaces Allen
- Joseph Jinbum Chargualaf Ho

== Tennis ==
Guam qualified 4 athletes in tennis:

Women

- Charlayne Labra Espinosa
- Camdyn Letah Nadler

Men

- Joshua Joseph P Cepeda
- Andrew Chung

== Triathlon ==
Guam qualified 7 athletes in triathlon

Women

- Genina Georgette Piolo Criss
- Mylene Garcia Garcia
- Karly Jael O'Neal
- Ayshalynn Almogela Perez

Men

- Patrick Bernard Aflague Camacho
- Peter Noble Lombard II
- James Cameron O'Neal

== Volleyball ==
Guam qualified men's and women's teams in volleyball (23 athletes):

Women

- Demie Rose Williams Brennan
- Leah Marie Jastillana Castro
- Adriana Sorah Chang
- Kyra Lilia Emiko Lee
- Dawn Kuunani Makio
- Mya Jade Certeza Sanchez
- Sheri n/a Stanley
- Muneka Joy Cruz Taisipic
- Joneen Veronica Hernandez Terlaje
- Jasie Elise Villanueva
- Maria Kamalin Aquiningoc Wahl
- Erin Marie Wong

Men

- Eric Mikel Palacios Ada
- Brian Attao Balajadia
- Teleforo Jerry Baza Balajadia Jr.
- Robert Mcmurray Borden
- Misaki Paul Cramer
- Kenneth William Brennan Leon Guerrero
- Jude Vincent Lizama
- Devin Douglas Maluwelmeng
- Luis Crisostomo Mesngon Jr.
- Nathaniel Justin Sanchez San Nicolas
- Derrick Charles Aquiningoc Wahl

== Weightlifting ==
Guam qualified 9 athletes in weightlifting:

Women

- Krystal Monique Tedtaotao Madden
- Amy Marie Reyes
- Kayla Sonido Taguacta
- Kimberly Sonido Taguacta

Men

- Zachary Joseph Bonanno
- Paul Patrick Mendiola Claros
- Shane Alan Concepcion
- Brandon James Holm
- Krysthian Marr Jeffersonne G Villanueva
