= Wallis and Futuna at the 2015 Pacific Games =

- IOC code: WLF

4 July 2015 – 18 July 2015
- Competitors: 64 in 8 sports
- Medals Ranked 18th: Gold 1 Silver 1 Bronze 5 Total 7

Pacific Games appearances
- 1966; 1969; 1971; 1975; 1979; 1983; 1987; 1991; 1995; 1999; 2003; 2007; 2011; 2015; 2019; 2023

Flag of Wallis and Futuna

Wallis and Futuna competed at the 2015 Pacific Games in Port Moresby, Papua New Guinea from 4 to 18 July 2015. Wallis and Futuna listed 64 competitors as of 4 July 2015. Three competitors were qualified in two sports. (Note: Francois Heafala, Paino Talikilagi Mulikihaamea and Willy Tuihihifo Vegi qualified in karate and taekwondo.)

== Athletics ==
Wallis and Futuna qualified two athletes in track and field:

Men

- Vahaafenua Vitolio Tipotio

=== Parasport ===
Men

- Lutoviko Halagahu

== Karate ==
Wallis and Futuna qualified five athletes in karate:

Men

- Francois Heafala
- Paino Talikilagi Mulikihaamea
- Paino Uatini
- Patita Foikoli Vegi
- Willy Tuihihifo Vegi

== Outrigger canoeing ==
Wallis and Futuna qualified 25 athletes in va'a:

Men

- Emile Ofataki Blondel
- Gerard Fuimaono
- Sylvain Kikanoi
- Lemisio Liogi - Mafutuna
- Kusitino Manufekai
- Lolesio Manufekai
- Kevin Pambrun
- Keleto Tauhola
- Jean-Noel Togiaki
- Pelenato Tokotuu
- Jacky Joe Tuakoifenua
- Petelo Tulitau
- Sosefo Tulitau
- Jean Louis Philippe Tuulaki

Women

- Stephane Goepfert
- Mkalita Mailehako Ép. Vehika
- Silivia Mataikamoana Ép. Mavaetau
- Malia Fatima Muni
- Alisone Siuli
- Bernadette Tauhola
- Caroline Tauhola
- Malia Pauahi Tauhola
- Armelle Lotana Togiaki
- Clarisse Faitaliha Tokotuu
- Elisee Tuifalehau Tokotuu

== Sailing ==
Wallis and Futuna qualified two athletes in sailing:

Men

- Corentin Likiliki
- Suliano Takatai

== Taekwondo ==
Wallis and Futuna qualified four athletes in taekwondo:

Men

- Francois Heafala
- Paino Talikilagi Mulikihaamea
- Patita Foikoli Lagafenua Vegi
- Willy Tuihihifo Vegi

== Volleyball ==
Wallis and Futuna qualified men's and women's volleyball teams (total of 24 players):

Men

- Petelo Faipule Kolokilagi
- Petelo Malivao
- Tomaakino Matavalu
- Matahi Christophe Niuliki
- Esekiele Sekeme
- Boris Takaniko
- Meliuahel Maile Maile Toafa Takaniko
- Fagonaatu Taofifenua
- Tali Ite Ofa Tiniloa
- Glenn Tevila Tuifua
- Fakafetai Iseso Fakafetai Tupou
- Vitali Petelo Tupou

Women

- Lita Fenuafanote
- Rose Marie Fiafialoto
- Tekela Fiafialoto
- Malia Lita Tafilagi
- Sperenza Taufana
- Heiata Kulukulu Tauota
- Malia Viane Tauota
- Vaiana-Nui Tauota
- Solen Rowena Tufele
- Samuele Tuia
- Emanuela Elodie Elodie Tupou
- Finau Vakalepu

== Weightlifting ==
Wallis and Futuna qualified four athletes in weightlifting:

Men

- Sikitaki Fulilagi
- Israel Kaikilekofe
- Paulo Keletolona

Women

- Ana Poema Tauhola
