= Niue at the 2015 Pacific Games =

- IOC code: NIU

4 July 2015 – 18 July 2015
- Competitors: 22 in 7 sports
- Medals Ranked 20th: Gold 0 Silver 1 Bronze 1 Total 2

Pacific Games appearances
- 1963; 1966–1975; 1979; 1983; 1987; 1991; 1995; 1999; 2003; 2007; 2011; 2015; 2019; 2023

Niue competed at the 2015 Pacific Games in Port Moresby, Papua New Guinea from 4 to 18 July 2015. Niue listed 22 competitors in 7 sports as of 4 July 2015.

== Athletics ==
Niue qualified one athlete in athletics:

- Boston Vakaheketaha

== Bodybuilding ==
Niue qualified two athletes in bodybuilding:

- Isabelle Davis
- Reagan Ioane

== Golf ==
Niue qualified two athletes in golf:

- Ten Talagi
- Charlie Togahai

== Lawn bowls ==
Niue qualified ten athletes in lawn bowls:

Men

- Mark Blumsky
- Dalton Tagelagi
- Keith Papani
- Frederick Tafatu
- Ezra Talamahina

Women

- Koumanogi Maota
- Catherine Papani
- Josephine Peyroux
- Pauline Rex Blumsky
- Fouasosa Tohovaka

== Powerlifting ==
Niue qualified one athlete in powerlifting:

- Malia Vea

== Shooting ==
Niue qualified four athletes in shooting:

- Morgan Magatogia
- Hivi Puheke
- Edward Sietu
- Sione Togiavalu

== Weightlifting ==
Niue qualified three athletes in weightlifting:

- Moses Mautama
- Motoria Tano
- Malia Vea
