= Vanuatu at the 2015 Pacific Games =

- IOC code: VAN

4 July 2015 – 18 July 2015
- Competitors: 161 in 14 sports
- Medals Ranked 15th: Gold 2 Silver 8 Bronze 12 Total 22

Pacific Games appearances
- 1983; 1987; 1991; 1995; 1999; 2003; 2007; 2011; 2015; 2019; 2023

Vanuatu competed at the 2015 Pacific Games in Port Moresby, Papua New Guinea from 4 to 18 July 2015. Vanuatu listed 161 competitors as of 4 July 2015.

== Athletics ==
Vanuatu qualified 17 athletes in track and field:

Women

- Janice Alatoa
- Jeannine Alatoa
- Judithe Alatoa
- Anna Lisa Batick
- Lily Iawantak
- Brandy Mento
- Fiona Tabi

Men

- Posco Laupas
- Samson Laus
- George Vinjeria Molisingi
- Paul Wilson Nalau
- John Samson
- Markly Simeon
- Bradly Toa

=== Parasport ===
Women

- Mary Mali Ramel

Men

- Rodney Sam Ben
- Lenold Gogorai

== Beach volleyball ==
Vanuatu qualified four athletes in beach volleyball:

Women

- Loti Joe
- Leeslyn Ler

Men

- Stephen Ham Reuben
- Isaac Mael

== Boxing ==
Vanuatu qualified eight athletes in boxing:

Men

- Daniel Iata
- Batick Kamty
- Jean Leonce Nauka
- Fred Nepakou
- Masing Jonathan Thu
- Boe Warawara
- Masing Warawara
- Robert Waritam

== Cricket ==
Vanuatu qualified men's and women's cricket teams (total of 29 players):

Women

- Rachel Andrew
- Judy Avok
- Jessica Chilia
- Leimaure Chilia
- Ruth Avis Kaltongga
- Valenta Langiatu
- Serah Mansale
- Selinda Tastuki Matautava
- Marcelina Mete
- Flora Nabanga
- Nasimana Navaika
- Christelle Johanna Sokomanu
- Selina Solman
- Mahina Tarimala

Men

- Callum Blake
- Jelany W. Chilia
- Johnathan Dunn
- Wolford Kalworai
- Trevor Langa
- Andrew Mansale
- Patrick K. Matautaava
- Nalin Nipiko
- Simpson Hopeman Obed
- Joshua Rasu
- Shem Simeon Sala
- Apolinaire Stephen
- Kenny Tari
- Ronald Tari
- Niko Georges Unavalu

== Field hockey ==
Vanuatu qualified men's and women's hockey fives teams (total of 18 players):

Women

- Roylani Apia
- Anna Job
- Kathleen Kalsav-Aru
- Christina Kalsong
- Evelyn Kalsong
- Helen Kawiel
- Belinda Nampas
- Mary Siro
- Jocelyn Toara

Men

- Morres Aromalo
- Henry Homry
- Nalpinie Iasi
- John Iawila
- Michel John
- John Johnas
- Jerry Kalnangisu
- Hiro Namu
- Ben Sam

== Football ==
Vanuatu qualified a men's football team (total of 23 players):

Men

- Chris Andrews
- Michel Kalmalap Coulon
- Raoul Charles Coulon
- Dalong Damelip
- Kaloran Firiam
- Selonie Iaruel
- Bong Kalo
- Remy Kalsrap
- Brian Kaltack
- Jean Kaltack
- Tony Kaltack
- Jaise Malsaranie
- Barry Mansale
- Patti Bill Nicholls
- Nilua Nickson Nikiau
- Channel Obed
- Abraham Roqara
- Nemani Roqara
- Jacky Axiel Ruben
- Kevin Shem
- Anthony Taiwia
- Junia Norman Vava

== Golf ==
Vanuatu qualified five athletes in golf:

Men

- Christopher George
- Stanley Malapa
- Clement Mansale
- Josepho Husman Matauatu
- Jonathan Naupa

== Karate ==
Vanuatu qualified nine athletes in karate:

Women

- Stephane Breton
- Vamule Vassy Mata Lango

Men

- Arnold Bonga
- Johnny Rosses Laau
- Tumu Lango
- Stephen Tarip Manaruru
- Michael Matai
- Jean Christophe Runa
- Steven Edward Tumu

== Netball ==
Vanuatu qualified a netball team (total of 12 players):

Women

- Lavinia Aromalo
- Nelline Buetari
- Royline Charlie
- Aileen Huri
- Vanessa Laloyer
- Pauline Malanga
- Monua Nalisa
- Kathy Sogari
- Stephany Tarileo
- Charlotte Temakon
- Lilian Willie
- Roselyne Willy

== Rugby sevens ==
Vanuatu qualified a men's rugby sevens team (total of 12 players):

Men

- Omari Kalmet Bakokoto
- Waute Chichirua
- Taputu Kalpukai
- Aquila Ita Kalsakau
- Koko Kalsal
- Malau Tevita Tai Manaroto
- Claude Raymond
- Antoine Sablan
- George Kalpausi Sablan
- Jeffrey Saurei
- Steven Jacob Shem
- Graham Malon Tungan

== Table tennis ==
Vanuatu qualified ten athletes in table tennis:

Women

- Roanna Abel
- Rosanna Abel
- Anolyn Flyn Flyn Lulu
- Stephanie Qwea
- Liopa Liupekena Lupekina Santhy

Men

- Alan Lam
- Ham Frexly Frexly Lulu
- Samuel Saul
- Yoshua Jordan Jordan Shing
- Randy William

== Taekwondo ==
Vanuatu qualified eight athletes in taekwondo:

Men

- Bruce Johnathanhttp://www.dailypost.vu/vanuatu_sports/article_33716a7b-dbbe-5fb2-8512-d54d0bae2b6e.html
- James Pita Johnny
- Patrice Kuautonga
- Alfred Loli
- Joseph Mackie
- Sairo Yaruel Nimisa
- Freddy Saksak
- Ian Tasso

== Tennis ==
Vanuatu qualified five athletes in tennis:

Women

- Lorraine Banimataku
- Daisy Rose Sipiti

Men

- Cyril Jacobe
- Aymeric Mara
- Leniker Jeremiah Thomas

== Weightlifting ==
Vanuatu qualified one athlete in weightlifting:

Men

- Pala Basil Mera Molisa
