= Solomon Islands at the 2015 Pacific Games =

- IOC code: SOL

4 July 2015 – 18 July 2015
- Competitors: 287 in 22 sports
- Flag bearer: Jenly Tegu Wini
- Medals Ranked 8th: Gold 7 Silver 6 Bronze 15 Total 28

Pacific Games appearances
- 1963; 1966; 1969; 1971; 1975; 1979; 1983; 1987; 1991; 1995; 1999; 2003; 2007; 2011; 2015; 2019; 2023

Solomon Islands competed at the 2015 Pacific Games in Port Moresby, Papua New Guinea from 4 to 18 July 2015. The Solomon Islands listed 287 competitors as of 4 July 2015.

== Athletics ==
Solomon Islands qualified nineteen athletes in track and field:

Men

- Alfred Iiisia
- Rubinson Kenedy
- Henry Mabe
- Freda Mama
- Alwin Muha
- Moses Ohaiihi
- Kevin Pio
- Rosefelo Siosi
- Mathew Sukulu
- Emmanuel Maefigo Tautaumae
- Chris Votu

Women

- Hilda Alavani
- Sharon Kikini Firisua
- Dianah Matekali

=== Parasport ===
Men

- Naka Kobariki

Women

- Diana Ma'ahoro
- Hellen Glenda Saohaga

== Basketball ==
Solomon Islands qualified men's and women's basketball teams (total of 29 players):

Men

- Augustine Namona Basia
- Arthur Makia Boardman
- Matthew Nicholas Boardman
- Brian David Kelesimfo Fatai
- Hilton Maetarau Gwali
- David Moses Kivo
- Moulton Matthew Maefilia
- Timmy Toata Magi
- Alex Chester Masaea
- Walton Ngibutai Panio
- Philip Tuhaika
- Waige Turueke
- Nigel Simeon Tutuo
- Allan Junior Wanefai

Women

- Joycelyn Aunga Basia
- Miriam Lingia Basia
- Mary Daffie
- Elsie Gwen Daiwo
- Rose Gwali
- Rowse Maea Lee
- Esther Teatanga Lii
- Leanne Lema Maetoloa
- Nisha Pongi Meneses
- Tessa Nori
- Delmah Niuhigo Peseika
- Nicola Nikki Ann Pongi
- Maya Tepua Van Den Heever
- Nefertiti Teusi Van Den Heever
- Lysa Orodo Wini

== Beach volleyball ==
Solomon Islands qualified five athletes in beach volleyball:

Men

- Benny Kefu
- James David Waneasi

Women

- Glency Eddie
- Sussie Teota Teno

== Bodybuilding ==
Solomon Islands qualified eight athletes in bodybuilding:

Men

- Allan Atai
- Leslie Ruraimanu Faarodo
- Gordon Laiseniasaenile
- Peter Molemae
- Dennis Dolaga Sala
- Rocky Teklem
- David Dan Tom
- Banabas Waga

== Boxing ==
Solomon Islands qualified six athletes in boxing:

Men

- Gardiel Kumata Gabuvai
- Paul Kava
- Francis Mano Milamila
- Redley Opa
- Alfie Junior Maungatuu Pongi Lai
- Holyfield Riga

== Field hockey ==
Solomon Islands qualified a men's hockey fives team (9 players):

Men

- Nixon Buga
- Eric Faasuia
- Gherzon Hesi
- Hicks Livingstone
- Gary Edward Nuopula
- Arthur Peloko
- Francis Sade
- Allen Temoa
- Floyd Vekebola

== Football ==
Solomon Islands qualified men's and women's football teams (total of 50 players):

Men

- Sandy Tahiri Aniholland
- Timothy Bakale
- Fred Bala
- Margaret Kala Belo
- Natanela Mosese Bero
- Fred Farui Buai
- Simon Daoi
- Fredrick Anita Dola
- James Dooro
- Atana Fa'arodo|Atana Junior Faarodo
- Matson Fenny
- Frank Foli
- Merina Philip Joe
- Obed Kevin
- George Ladoga
- Timothy Maearasia
- Harrison Mala
- Philip Mango
- Dickson Mouli
- Keso Hendry Nelson
- Allen Peter
- Boni Pride
- Jimmy Raramane
- John Rofeta
- Jared Bently Maela Rongosulia
- Misitana Samani
- Anthony Furai Talo
- Tuti Zama Tanito
- Davidson Tome
- Alex Allen Waimora

Women

- Cathy Aihunu
- Crystal Annie Bakolo
- Annie Geli
- Elsie Kwoaetolo
- Elizabeth Betty Malau
- Jessica Rose Mana
- Brenda Birisi Masae
- Ella Misibini
- Agnes Noisi
- Hazelyn Nunu
- Janise Desie Onika
- Caroline Otainao
- Rose Junior Titi Paia
- Alice Patrick
- Betty Sade
- Layda Anitae Samani
- Liza Solo
- Roselyn Takaramu
- Elizabeth Teiasi
- Veronica Tolivaka

== Golf ==
Solomon Islands qualified twelve athletes in golf:

Men

- Alick Dalo
- James Faeni
- Ben Felani
- Tonny Ramo
- George Albert Rukabo
- Wesley Talaka Sifaka

Women

- Sitina Luisa Balekana
- Everlyn Maelasi
- Ravatu Tabe
- Rosita Teofilo
- Ronica Dima Tyson
- Norma Jans Wopereis

== Karate ==
Solomon Islands qualified six athletes in karate:

Men

- Robert Gregory Anita
- Frengy Bisoka
- Selwyn Kuru
- Ashley John Marigeni
- Harry Kima Marigeni

Women

- Janet Lydia Gwai

== Netball ==
Solomon Islands qualified a netball team (14 players):

Women

- Helen Kathleen Aumae
- Rebby Namoi Basia
- Muriel Dagi
- Margaret Garo
- Monica Hanahunu
- Jessica Qilavuru Lapo
- Ethel Leamana
- Judith Harriet Mamuli
- Roina Oke
- Miriam Poloso
- Nadine Rakeiforau
- Merry Arifu Taloga
- Shalom Akao Waita
- Nimah Harkness Wilmot

== Powerlifting ==
Solomon Islands qualified four athletes in powerlifting:

Men

- Watson Hou
- Rocky Manisui Ramo
- Milton Belo Sade

Women

- Vicky Maomaiasi

== Rugby league nines ==
Solomon Islands qualified a men's rugby league nines team (22 players):

Men

- Bruce Angikimua
- Zanetana Dragomir Djokovic
- Maitoo Aohana Hauirae
- Atson Hudy Hou
- Elwin Tangimatai John
- Mostyn Maenuu (Jnr)
- Ezekiel Wale Mana
- Jeffery Maungatuu
- Steve Tepuke Moana
- Jimmy Kauga Puia
- Timo Ngatonga Sanga
- Moses Moetai Singamoana
- Rodney Sinugeba
- Tuimaugi Steve Kauga
- Lavan Taika
- Duran Tomasi Taupongi
- Eugene Tepai Tekobi
- Carlwyn Tengemoana
- Tingiia Tino
- Billy Junior Toatee
- Lavern Tuhatangata
- Utu Junior Willy

== Rugby sevens ==
Solomon Islands qualified a men's rugby sevens team (14 players):

Men

- John Bakila
- Jonathan Maitaki Kaituu
- Ephrem Baptiste Kelesi
- Mariano Lewis Buzzo Kelesi
- Viv Frank Kelesi
- Sakus Maelasi
- Jonny Tapuika Maui
- Steven Momoa
- Frank Tautai Paikea
- Leslie Ngiumoana Puia
- Solly Giungataa Seuika
- Roger Tepai
- Roman Pautangata Tongaka
- Shane Yee

== Sailing ==
Solomon Islands qualified five athletes in sailing:

Men

- Charles Baragamu
- Joe Beliga
- Clyde Jedzini
- Olson Pancrasio Tome Sikwaae
- Steven Wako

== Swimming ==
Solomon Islands qualified six athletes in swimming:

Men

- Jobest Koohioa Dan
- Albert Kado
- Clayment Bill Lafiara

Women

- Eva Gali
- Rose Tadoe
- Justine Qiroqiro Taenaferu

== Table tennis ==
Solomon Islands qualified one athlete in table tennis:

Men

- Rob Dorovolomo

== Taekwondo ==
Solomon Islands qualified 10 athletes in taekwondo:

Men

- Delly Alick
- Davis Goni
- Herick Henry
- Isaac Pat Myrie
- Winston Clody Poko
- Nelson Ramoi
- Clyde Sade Rika
- David George Sulumae
- Patrick Tom

Women

- Emily Magaret Kwoaetolo

== Tennis ==
Solomon Islands qualified eight athletes in tennis:

Men

- Charlie Junior Junior Benjamin
- Christinnoh Fujiyama
- Graham Junior Mani
- Luke Paeni
- Lam Selwyn

Women

- Irene Mahnke
- Geojimah Sauramoniabu Row
- Vinda Sylvia None Teally

== Touch rugby ==
Solomon Islands qualified a men's touch rugby team (13 players):

Men

4th – Men's tournament

- Harry Bangesunga Atikake
- Laurenson Taga Ilala
- Oconnor Umangamoana Puia
- Allen Samani
- Chris Meqi Saru
- Felix Galo Solomon
- Ellison Junior Suri
- Simon Suiaimoana Tepuke
- Presley Naotago Teseu
- John Tipaika Tingiia
- Paul Joseph Junior Tovua
- Izzy Tuhakiu
- Masikwai Wale

== Triathlon ==
Solomon Islands qualified six athletes in triathlon:

Men

- Jad Godfrey Nalo
- Rocky Donald Ratu
- Boris Teddy

Women

- Melisa Bereta
- Mary Marasina
- Andriana Tukuvia

== Volleyball ==
Solomon Islands qualified men's and women's volleyball teams (total of 27 players):

Men

- Tibao Amon
- Wilton Auga
- Christian Tentaku Bakeua
- George Boraing
- Jeremiah Amba Kakoi
- Davis Karotu
- Hamilton Kasi
- Francis Koria
- Douglas Ladomea
- Rolex Minu
- Hunter Kulienai Nuopula Jnr
- Rex Jamie Sade
- Emmanuel Tenai
- Carlvyn Rex Teno

Women

- Lindy Diau
- Hannah Uuna Donga
- Hilda Folanga
- Annie Olokwao James
- Minah Tonungenga Maitaki
- Nadya Hakatahia Nasiu
- Evalita Reuben
- Sogha Ken Reuben
- Evalita Ruben
- Corona Tanavalu
- Kaysie Paieke Tesua
- Dalcy Makane Vahoe
- Rossina Marama Vahoe

== Weightlifting ==
Solomon Islands qualified eleven athletes in weightlifting:

Men

- David Nickson Biolo
- David Gorosi
- Leslie Mae
- Albert Maeke
- Brown Chester Ramohaka
- Anthony Saru

Women

- Hepline Iro
- Arina Kalibiu
- Mary Kini Lifu
- Daisy Tolugu
- Jenly Tegu Wini
