= Cook Islands at the 2015 Pacific Games =

- IOC code: COK

4 July 2015 – 18 July 2015
- Competitors: 132 in 13 sports
- Flag bearer: Tereapii Tapoki
- Medals Ranked 10th: Gold 6 Silver 7 Bronze 15 Total 28

Pacific Games appearances
- 1963; 1966; 1969; 1971; 1975; 1979; 1983; 1987; 1991; 1995; 1999; 2003; 2007; 2011; 2015; 2019; 2023

The Cook Islands competed at the 2015 Pacific Games in Port Moresby, Papua New Guinea from 4 to 18 July 2015. A total of 132 competitors for the Cook Islands were listed as of 4 July 2015.

== Athletics ==
Women

- Patricia Nooroa Taea
- Tereapii O Jean Ki Nz Tapoki

== Beach volleyball ==
Men

- Brendon Manatu Kainuku Heath
- Daniel Trevor Heath

== Cricket ==
Cook Islands qualified a women's team in cricket (13 players):

Women

Women's tournament.

- Erica Myra Jancey Lacynthia Rani
- June Ura Pori Makea George
- Maloku Mataora
- Marii Kaukura
- Metuavaine Benedicta Matapo
- Mirioni Ngametua
- Mummy Raupa Elikana
- Phillica Prisnia Uraiata Tesannra Maruariki
- Punanga Kaveao
- Salaberga Okirua Matapo
- Tereakama Daena Kataina
- Terito Ine
- Tina Turua Mato

== Football ==
Women

- Jennifer Kaiwala Andrea Akavi
- Helen Gloria Ngauora
- Tuakana Moeroa Noovao
- Mii Yvonne Piri
- Tepaeru Helen Toka
- Marjorie Katrina Ngatupuna Toru
- Josephine Clark Turepu
- Tekura Scholastica Urarii
- Maeva Judith Carr
- Elizabeth Poea Harmon
- Moeroa Harmon
- Marissa Alexis Elanor Moira Iroa
- Tekura Kaukura
- Elise Tipani Alexandra Mamanu-Gray
- Upokotea Diane Manuela
- Lee Maoate-Cox

== Golf ==
- William Howard
- Royle Brogan
- Kirk Tuaiti
- Daniel Webb
- Priscilla Viking
- Memory Akama
- Rotana Howard
- Rowena Newbigging

== Sailing ==
- Men's Laser team

- Taua Henry
- Joshua Ioane

- Women's Laser Radial team

- Helema Williams
- Teau McKenzie

Women's Laser Radial single Helema Williams Teau McKenzie

== Touch rugby ==
Cook Islands qualified men's and women's teams in touch rugby (28 athletes):

Women

– Women's tournament.

- Julieanne Westrupp
- Hemilda Tereapii Vavia
- Edith Nicholas
- Rangitauratua Vicki Apera
- Taromi Teremoana Urirau
- Ngapare Kura Noovao
- Princess Mary Adams
- Ngapoko Parau Joan Kamana
- Sunielia Karen Cherina Tom
- Rima'Ati Moekaa
- Teiti-O-Te-Ra Tupuna
- Dayna Victoria Napa
- Matatai Jandawn Taia
- Lou-Ani Marie Alexander Marsters

Men

– Men's tournament.

- Kapi Andrew Andrew Anguna
- Rangi-Te-Au-O-Tepuretu Desmond Piri
- Cahjun Sean-Colin Tamatoa Harry Willis
- Harmas Jason Potoru
- Teava Pakari Terangi
- Hugh Jerome Tangaroa Henry
- Benjamin John Heather
- Ngatupuna Hiro Joseph
- Mokopuna Grandson Nooroa
- Setephano Noovao
- Apii College Rau
- Matamanea Christopher Andrew Matapakia
- Kristopher Ru Tetokorangi Williamson
- Heimona Thomas Potoru
