= Tahiti at the 2015 Pacific Games =

- IOC code: TAH

4 July 2015 – 8 July 2015
- Competitors: 273 in 21 sports
- Medals Ranked 3rd: Gold 39 Silver 34 Bronze 41 Total 114

Pacific Games appearances
- 1963; 1966; 1969; 1971; 1975; 1979; 1983; 1987; 1991; 1995; 1999; 2003; 2007; 2011; 2015; 2019; 2023

French Polynesia competed as Tahiti at the 2015 Pacific Games in Port Moresby, Papua New Guinea from 4 to 18 July 2015. Tahiti listed 273 competitors as of 4 July 2015. Of these, five competitors were qualified in two sports each. (Note: Titiri Marie-Anne Charton, Claudine Yu Hing and Teremu Touatekina qualified in powerlifting and weightlifting, Taraina Rataro-Tuihaa qualified in boxing and taekwondo, and Salome De Barthez De Marmorieres qualified in athletics and triathlon.)

== Athletics ==
Tahiti qualified 25 athletes in track and field:

Women

- Tea Boyer
- Heiata Brinkfield
- Kahaia Dauphin
- Salome De Barthez De Marmorieres
- Tahiona Doucet
- Elodie Elodie Menou (epse Mevel)
- Mihiatea Gooding
- Timeri Lamorelle
- Vainui Neagle
- Gwoelani Patu
- Candice Richer
- Teumere Lucie Teumere Tepu

Men

- Gregory Bradai
- Tumatai Dauphin
- Louis Ligerot
- Raihau Maiau
- Loic Mevel
- Walter Patu
- Georges Richmond
- Winsy Tama
- Reggie Taumaa
- Namataiki Tevenino
- Teuraiterai Tupaia
- Cedric Wane

=== Para Sport ===
Men

- Christian Chee Ayee

== Basketball ==
Tahiti qualified men's and women's teams in basketball (23 athletes in total):

Women

- Heimano Buisson
- Reva Dauphin
- Orama Laille
- Alizee Lefranc
- Oceane Lefranc
- Maea Lextreyt
- Rosa Mahana Tuhiata Mariteragi
- Myranda Mariteragi (epse Bonnet)
- Aeata Tepu
- Mahine Kamakea Tepu
- Mahinetea Vidal

Men

- Michel Audouin
- Andy Commings
- Eddy Commings
- Glenn Garbutt
- Ariihau Meuel
- Ariirimarau Meuel
- Teva Rauzy
- Derrick Scott
- Reihiti Sommers
- Matehau Taputu
- Rahitiarii Teriierooiterai
- Larry Teriitemataua

== Beach volleyball ==
Tahiti qualified men's and women's teams in beach volleyball (4 athletes in total):

Women

- Onyx Le Bihan
- Heiani Vaki

Men

- Terau Raitama Ena
- Terii Steve Steve Tauraa

== Bodybuilding ==
Tahiti qualified 6 athletes in body building:

Men

- Steve Ah Scha
- Stanley Serge Bruneau
- Gary Colombani
- Simon Luis
- Jean Yann Maitere
- Samuel-Jean Mercier

== Boxing ==
Tahiti qualified 13 athletes in boxing:

Women

- Taraina Rataro-Tuihaa
- Marie-Madeleine Taura
- Edith Tavanae

Men

- Matauarii Ienfa
- Heiarii Mai
- Tautuarii Nena
- Heimata Neuffer
- Ariitea Putoa
- Walter Raurahi
- Terauri Rowan Taurei
- Jordan Tuihaa
- Eddy Tuuhia
- Roger Waoute

== Football ==
Tahiti qualified a men's team in football (24 players):

Men

- Raimana Tipahaehae
- Rainui Aroita
- Temauiarii Crolas
- Raimana Dhalluin
- Vaiarii Halligan
- Manuarii Hauata
- Heremoana Hoata
- Tauhiti Keck
- Tauatua Lucas
- Michel Maihi
- Gael Tevaimoana Meslien
- Louis Petitgas
- Ryan Petitgas
- Thibault Pito
- Noho Raumatahi
- Tehei Taupotini
- Mauarii Tehina
- Tevairoa Tehuritaua
- Tetahio Teriinohopuaiterai
- Raiamanu Tetauira
- Tamatoa Tetauira
- Tuma Tiatoa
- Yohann Tihoni
- Fred Tissot

== Golf ==
Tahiti qualified 9 athletes in golf:

Women

- Mareva Collado-Nordhoff
- Maggy Dury
- Anne Vaea Nauta
- Anne Vaea Nauta
- Denise Taruoura (ep Yan)

Men

- Tamihau Bougues
- Theo Carlotti
- Jean-François Cazaux
- Matahiapo Wohler

== Karate ==
Tahiti qualified 7 athletes in karate:

Women

- Vaitiare Tehaameamea

Men

- Killian Laugrost
- Matahi Lemaire
- Honoiti Lien
- Noa Lucas
- Vincent Mikula
- Anapa Otcenasek

== Outrigger canoeing ==
Tahiti qualified 30 athletes in va'a:

Women

- Angelique Aiho
- Utiutirei Flores
- Temake Frida Faura
- Tiahiti Itchner
- Ahipua Lee
- Brenda Vaimiti Maoni
- Hotuniuarii Leila Tama
- Puatea Taruoura
- Rarahu Taruoura
- Hereiti Annette Tavaearii
- Hivalani Tetuamanuhiri
- Mata Tufaimea
- Sandy Vane
- Rose Veselsky

Men

- Ariioehau Gordon Tamatea Bourgerie
- Tuteariimaroura Hoatua
- Moe Miti Teihoarii Ihorai Brotherson
- Sly Rendy Jefferson Ly Sao
- Raunui Jhon Makiroto-Piritua
- Tuatini Alfred Makiroto-Piritua
- Manuarai Maruaitu
- Tauhiti Nena
- Brice Tihaunui Punuataahitua
- Heiata Ravahere Manea
- Hititua Taerea
- Teraivetea Taruoura
- Harley Maui Tavaearii
- Abel Arii Teriitemataua
- Revi Landry Raihau Thon Sing
- Temanarii Utia

== Powerlifting ==
Tahiti qualified 9 athletes in powerlifting:

Women

- Titiri Marie-Anne Charton
- Alexandrine Fanaura
- Claudine Yu Hing

Men

- Joachim Ah Scha
- Zelyko Manua
- Augustin Rua
- Hinau Teotahi
- Teremu Touatekina
- Nelva Vahimarae

== Rugby sevens ==
Tahiti qualified men's and women's teams in rugby sevens (25 players in total):

Rugby Union 7s

Women

- Cloe Devaluez
- Eva Huchede
- Maruiata Hurahutia
- Lucette Kimitete
- Toimata Mickaeli Mooria
- Nawel Remini
- Desire Takatai
- Herenui Tehuiotoa
- Anais Heimata Temarii
- Meihiti Teriinohopuaiterai
- Hanaley Teuira (ep Yun Shan Fat)
- Florine Tevero
- Raitiare Tihani Tokoragi

Men

- Teuira Frogier
- Vainui Frogier
- Andoni Jimenez
- Taitearii Mahuru
- Foliaki Makalea
- Vincent Perez
- Marc Richmond
- François Tardieu
- Yves Tehaameamea
- Anthony Tesquet
- Haley Teuira
- Andrew Vanaa

== Sailing ==
Tahiti qualified 6 athletes in sailing:

Women

- Elise Djenadi
- Gwenaelle Janicaud
- Emmanuel Rousseau

Men

- Arnaud Teva Bourdelon
- Tuiterai Salmon
- Teiva Veronique

== Shooting ==
Tahiti qualified 8 athletes in shooting:

Women

- Marie-Louise Normand (ep Darius) – 10 m air pistol female.

Men

- Moeava Bambridge
- Tuanua Degage
- Gabriel Lan San – 10 m air pistol male.
- Alexandre Lehartel
- Jean-Pierre Mihuraa
- Jean-Hiro Pratx
- Freddy Yen Kway – 25 m pistol mixed.

== Squash ==
Tahiti qualified 8 athletes in squash:

Women

- Heimana Charles (ep Chung)
- Isabelle Gouaille (ep Olite)
- Agnes Pierson (ep Chantre)
- Beatrice Villa

Men

- Ridge Chung
- Laurent Ferruci
- Yann Lo
- Phillippe Rougier

== Swimming ==
Tahiti qualified 9 athletes in swimming:

Women

- Mehani Bernadino
- Alizee Diaz

Men

- Anthony Clark
- Rahiti De Vos
- Stephane Debaere
- Teiki Dupont
- Hugo Lambert
- Henere Sommers
- Rainui Teriipaia-Rentier

== Table tennis ==
Tahiti qualified 10 athletes in table tennis:

Women

- Alize Belrose
- Rachel Hsiao
- Tearo Le Caill
- Melveen Richmond
- Aurelie Cyrine Sam
- Tuarikirau Thunot

Men

- Gregoire Dossier
- Ocean Belrose
- Hugo Gendron
- Tinihau-O-Terai Klouman

== Taekwondo ==
Tahiti qualified 13 athletes in taekwondo:

Women

- Alison Deane
- Moehau Faaite
- Urariimarotini Hamblin
- Mataheitini Raihauti
- Taraina Rataro-Tuihaa
- Horue Taufa

Men

- Peter Babka
- Waldeck Defaix
- Lloyd Tuarai Hery
- Manu Huaatua
- Teava Mu
- Kaheiani Pittman
- Teddy Teng

== Tennis ==
Tahiti qualified 9 athletes in tennis:

Women

- Naia Guitton
- Ravahere Marie-Emilie Rauzy
- Estelle Tehau
- Mayka Tehani Zima

Men

- Reihiti Chin Meun
- Patrice Cotti
- Heve Kelley
- Reynald Taaroa
- Angelo Yersin

== Triathlon ==
Tahiti qualified 6 athletes in triathlon:

Women

- Kari Lee Armour (ep Lazzari)
- Salome De Barthez De Marmorieres
- Poerava Van Bastolaire

Men

- Laurent Barra
- Keanu Lorfevre
- Benjamin Zorgnotti

== Volleyball ==
Tahiti qualified men's and women's teams in volleyball (28 athletes in total):

Women

- Tehea Labaste
- Tehei Labaste
- Vaimiti Lee Tam
- Hinarii Mahai
- Poai-Ura Manate
- Maimiti Patricia Patricia Mare (ep Taputuarai)
- Raurea Marie-Lise Temarii
- Matirita Stephanie Moua
- Valeria Paofai (epse Vaki)
- Grace Patu
- Hinanui Teai
- Taiana Tere
- Katia Tetuanui
- Louisa Lokelani Lokelani Vero

Men

- Wilson Tuitete Bonno
- Jim Hapipi
- Vehiatua Heitarauri
- Benjamin Leprado
- Vaianuu Mare
- Heimana Marii
- Emile Yoan Teanuanu Paofai
- Nohoarii Paofai
- Arona Pitomai
- Tapuragni Sommers
- Vatea Mikael Tauraa
- Maruake Teivao
- Haereotahi Terorohauepa
- Ryan Utia

== Weightlifting ==
Tahiti qualified 6 athletes in weightlifting:

Women

- Titiri Marie-Anne Charton
- Tehea Riipeu (epse Ratia)
- Claudine Yu Hing

Men

- Daniel Mana
- Honoura Roopinia
- Teremu Touatekina
