= 2019 World Weightlifting Championships – Women's +87 kg =

The women's +87 kg competition at the 2019 World Weightlifting Championships was held on 26 and 27 September 2019.

== Schedule ==
Date	Time	Event
26 September 2019	12:00	Group B
27 September 2019	13:25	Group A

== Medalists ==
Event	Gold		Silver		Bronze	
Snatch	Li Wenwen (CHN)	146 kg	Tatiana Kashirina (RUS)	140 kg	Meng Suping (CHN)	137 kg
Clean & Jerk	Li Wenwen (CHN)	186 kg	Tatiana Kashirina (RUS)	178 kg	Meng Suping (CHN)	174 kg
Total	Li Wenwen (CHN)	332 kg	Tatiana Kashirina (RUS)	318 kg	Meng Suping (CHN)	311 kg

== Records ==
Prior to this competition, the existing world records were as follows.

World Record	Snatch	Li Wenwen (CHN)	147 kg	Ningbo, China	28 April 2019
World Record	Clean & Jerk	Tatiana Kashirina (RUS)	185 kg	Ashgabat, Turkmenistan	10 November 2018
World Record	Total	Tatiana Kashirina (RUS)	331 kg	Batumi, Georgia	13 April 2019

== Results ==
Rank	Athlete	Group	Snatch (kg)				Clean & Jerk (kg)				Total
Rank	Athlete	Group	1	2	3	Rank	1	2	3	Rank	Total
1st place, gold medalist(s)	Li Wenwen (CHN)	A	136	142	146	1st place, gold medalist(s)	175	182	186	1st place, gold medalist(s)	332
2nd place, silver medalist(s)	Tatiana Kashirina (RUS)	A	~~140~~	~~140~~	140	2nd place, silver medalist(s)	~~173~~	173	178	2nd place, silver medalist(s)	318
3rd place, bronze medalist(s)	Meng Suping (CHN)	A	131	137	~~140~~	3rd place, bronze medalist(s)	~~173~~	174	~~183~~	3rd place, bronze medalist(s)	311
4	Kim Kuk-hyang (PRK)	A	~~125~~	125	130	5	167	173	~~176~~	4	303
5	Anastasiya Lysenko (UKR)	A	122	126	129	6	148	153	157	6	286
6	Laurel Hubbard (NZL)	A	120	125	131	4	145	~~150~~	154	8	285; OR
7	Sarah Robles (USA)	A	120	125	~~129~~	7	155	160	~~163~~	5	285
8	Son Young-hee (KOR)	B	113	118	121	8	150	155	~~160~~	7	276
9	Emily Campbell (GBR)	A	114	~~118~~	~~118~~	13	145	149	153	9	267
10	Verónica Saladín (DOM)	A	120	~~125~~	~~126~~	9	140	~~145~~	145	12	265
11	Nurul Akmal (INA)	B	110	~~114~~	~~114~~	14	~~145~~	145	150	10	260
12	Yaniuska Espinosa (VEN)	B	110	113	115	12	140	144	—	13	259
13	Lisseth Ayoví (ECU)	B	112	116	~~118~~	11	136	138	142	15	258
14	Feagaiga Stowers (SAM)	B	112	116	~~119~~	10	141	~~146~~	~~146~~	16	257
15	Charisma Amoe-Tarrant (AUS)	B	101	106	~~111~~	16	137	142	~~145~~	14	248
16	Iuniarra Sipaia (SAM)	B	102	~~107~~	~~107~~	18	141	146	~~150~~	11	248
17	Gladis Bueno (MEX)	B	102	106	109	15	131	136	~~139~~	17	245
18	Melike Günal (TUR)	B	100	~~104~~	105	17	125	~~130~~	~~131~~	18	230
19	Kuinini Manumua (TGA)	B	90	93	96	19	105	110	115	19	211

== New records ==
Clean & Jerk	186 kg	Li Wenwen (CHN)	WR
Total	332 kg	Li Wenwen (CHN)	WR
