= 2023 World Weightlifting Championships – Women's +87 kg =

The women's +87 kilograms competition at the 2023 World Weightlifting Championships was held on 16 September 2023.

== Schedule ==
Date	Time	Event
16 September 2023	09:30	Group C
16 September 2023	11:30	Group B
16 September 2023	16:30	Group A

== Medalists ==
Event	Gold		Silver		Bronze	
Snatch	Park Hye-jeong (KOR)	124 kg	Son Young-hee (KOR)	122 kg	Lisseth Ayoví (ECU)	121 kg
Clean & Jerk	Park Hye-jeong (KOR)	165 kg	Mary Theisen-Lappen (USA)	160 kg	Lisseth Ayoví (ECU)	155 kg
Total	Park Hye-jeong (KOR)	289 kg	Mary Theisen-Lappen (USA)	277 kg	Lisseth Ayoví (ECU)	276 kg

== Records ==
Prior to this competition, the existing world records were as follows.

World record	Snatch	Li Wenwen (CHN)	148 kg	Tashkent, Uzbekistan	25 April 2021
World record	Clean & Jerk	Li Wenwen (CHN)	187 kg	Tashkent, Uzbekistan	25 April 2021
World record	Total	Li Wenwen (CHN)	335 kg	Tashkent, Uzbekistan	25 April 2021

== Results ==
Rank	Athlete	Group	Snatch (kg)				Clean & Jerk (kg)				Total
Rank	Athlete	Group	1	2	3	Rank	1	2	3	Rank	Total
1st place, gold medalist(s)	Park Hye-jeong (KOR)	A	120	124	~~131~~	1st place, gold medalist(s)	~~158~~	158	165	1st place, gold medalist(s)	289
2nd place, silver medalist(s)	Mary Theisen-Lappen (USA)	A	~~117~~	117	~~121~~	6	156	160	~~166~~	2nd place, silver medalist(s)	277
3rd place, bronze medalist(s)	Lisseth Ayoví (ECU)	A	111	116	121	3rd place, bronze medalist(s)	146	150	155	3rd place, bronze medalist(s)	276
4	Halima Abdelazim (EGY)	A	~~120~~	120	~~123~~	4	148	152	~~157~~	5	272
5	Sarah Robles (USA)	A	117	~~121~~	~~123~~	5	145	~~150~~	150	6	267
6	Iuniarra Sipaia (SAM)	A	105	110	~~114~~	11	150	154	~~157~~	4	264
7	Crismery Santana (DOM)	B	110	114	~~116~~	7	136	141	145	8	259
8	Nurul Akmal (INA)	B	~~105~~	105	110	10	~~145~~	146	~~150~~	7	256
9	Wang Ling-chen (TPE)	B	110	~~114~~	~~114~~	9	140	~~143~~	143	9	253
10	Tursunoy Jabborova (UZB)	B	110	~~114~~	~~116~~	8	~~135~~	135	141	10	251
11	Tuana Süren (TUR)	B	102	106	~~109~~	12	134	137	~~140~~	12	243
12	Naryury Pérez (VEN)	C	95	100	105	13	120	130	135	13	240
13	Taiane Justino (BRA)	B	98	~~102~~	102	14	132	137	~~141~~	11	239
14	Susana Nimo (NZL)	C	93	~~98~~	101	15	115	116	~~120~~	16	217
15	Scarleth Ucelo (GUA)	C	85	90	~~92~~	16	~~118~~	~~118~~	118	14	208
16	Tereza Králová (CZE)	C	~~85~~	85	~~90~~	17	106	112	117	15	202
17	Marie Korkor Agbah-Hughes (GHA)	C	60	64	67	18	85	~~91~~	~~93~~	17	152
18	Rana Al-Harbi (KSA)	C	48	52	~~55~~	19	68	~~72~~	74	18	126
—	Son Young-hee (KOR)	A	115	~~121~~	122	2nd place, silver medalist(s)	~~157~~	—	—	—	—
—	Li Wenwen (CHN)	A	~~130~~	~~130~~	—	—	—	—	—	—	—
—	Emily Campbell (GBR)	A	—	—	—	—	—	—	—	—	—
—	Yaniuska Espinosa (VEN)	B	~~105~~	~~105~~	~~105~~	—	~~130~~	—	—	—	—
—	Duangaksorn Chaidee (THA)	B	—	—	—	—	—	—	—	—	—
—	Sarah Fischer (AUT)	B	—	—	—	—	—	—	—	—	—
—	Anastasiia Hotfrid (GEO)	C	—	—	—	—	—	—	—	—	—
—	Lorraine Ligare (KEN)	C	Did not start								
