= Weightlifting at the 2022 Commonwealth Games – Women's +87 kg =

Weightlifting – Women's +87 kg at the 2022 Commonwealth Games
- Venue: National Exhibition Centre
- Dates: 3 August
- Competitors: 10 from 10 nations
- Winning total: 286 kg

Medalists
gold medal	Emily Campbell	England
silver medal	Feagaiga Stowers	Samoa
bronze medal	Charisma Amoe Tarrant	Australia

The Women's +87 kg weightlifting event at the 2022 Commonwealth Games took place at the National Exhibition Centre on 3 August 2022. The weightlifter from England, Olympic silver medalist Emily Campbell, won the gold, with a combined lift of 286 kg.

== Records ==
Prior to this competition, the existing world, Commonwealth and Games records were as follows:

World record	Snatch	Li Wenwen (CHN)	148 kg	Tashkent, Uzbekistan	25 April 2021
World record	Clean & Jerk	Li Wenwen (CHN)	187 kg	Tashkent, Uzbekistan	25 April 2021
World record	Total	Li Wenwen (CHN)	335 kg	Tashkent, Uzbekistan	25 April 2021
Commonwealth record	Snatch	Laurel Hubbard (NZL)	133 kg	Canberra, Australia	1 March 2020
Commonwealth record	Clean & Jerk	Emily Campbell (ENG)	161 kg	Tokyo, Japan	2 August 2021
Commonwealth record	Total	Laurel Hubbard (NZL)	285 kg	Pattaya, Thailand	27 September 2019
Games record	Snatch	Commonwealth Games Standard	115 kg		
Games record	Clean & Jerk	Commonwealth Games Standard	147 kg		
Games record	Total	Commonwealth Games Standard	263 kg		

The following records were established during the competition:

Snatch	124 kg	Emily Campbell (ENG)	GR
Clean & Jerk	162 kg	Emily Campbell (ENG)	CR, GR
Total	286 kg	Emily Campbell (ENG)	CR, GR

When the previous records and weight classes were discarded following readjustment, the IWF defined "world standards" as the minimum lifts needed to qualify as world records (WR), CommonWealth Authority defined "Commonwealth standards" and "Commonwealth games standards" as the minimum lifts needed to qualify as Commonwealth record (CR) and Commonwealth games record (GR) in the new weight classes. Wherever World Standard/Commonwealth Standard/Commonwealth Games Standard appear in the list above, no qualified weightlifter has yet lifted the benchmark weights in a sanctioned competition.

== Schedule ==
All times are British Summer Time (UTC+1)

Date	Time	Round
Wednesday 3 August 2022	14:30	Final

== Results ==
Rank	Athlete	Body weight (kg)	Snatch (kg)				Clean & Jerk (kg)				Total
Rank	Athlete	Body weight (kg)	1	2	3	Result	1	2	3	Result	Total
1st place, gold medalist(s)	Emily Campbell (ENG)	128.50	117	121	124	124 GR	152	157	162	162; GR, CR	286; GR, CR
2nd place, silver medalist(s)	Feagaiga Stowers (SAM)	121.11	117	~~121~~	121	121	147	~~154~~	~~154~~	147	268
3rd place, bronze medalist(s)	Charisma Amoe-Tarrant (AUS)	153.30	95	~~100~~	100	100	127	139	~~145~~	139	239
4	Emma Friesen (CAN)	112.56	~~106~~	106	~~110~~	106	123	128	132	132	238
5	Kuinini Manumua (TGA)	101.86	101	104	107	107	121	125	128	128	235
6	Purnima Pandey (IND)	98.19	~~103~~	103	~~108~~	103	125	~~133~~	~~133~~	125	228
7	Manine Lynch (COK)	124.82	83	86	~~90~~	86	111	116	~~121~~	116	202
8	Thimali Wiyannalage (SRI)	117.08	80	85	89	89	105	110	~~113~~	110	199
9	Helen Anastasia Seipua (FIJ)	114.22	81	~~85~~	85	85	102	108	~~113~~	108	193
10	Elisia Scicluna (MLT)	94.68	80	~~83~~	~~83~~	80	100	103	105	105	185
