= Weightlifting at the 2017 Summer Universiade – Women's +90 kg =

Women's +90 kg at the XXIX Summer Universiade
- Venues: Tamkang University Shao-Mo Memorial Gymnasium 7F
- Dates: 25 August 2017
- Competitors: 8 from 8 nations

Medalists
1st place, gold medalist(s)		Kim Kuk-hyang	North Korea
2nd place, silver medalist(s)		Chitchanok Pulsabsakul	Thailand
3rd place, bronze medalist(s)		Mercy Brown	Great Britain

The women's +90 kg event at the 2017 Summer Universiade was held on 25 August at the Tamkang University Shao-Mo Memorial Gymnasium 7F.

== Records ==
Prior to this competition, the existing world and Universiade records were as follows.

- Initial records

Category		Nation	Athlete	Record	Place	Date	Meet
World record	Snatch	Russia	Tatiana Kashirina	155 kg	Almaty, Kazakhstan	16 November 2014	2014 World Championships
World record	Clean & Jerk	Russia	Tatiana Kashirina	193 kg	Almaty, Kazakhstan	16 November 2014	2014 World Championships
World record	Total	Russia	Tatiana Kashirina	348 kg	Almaty, Kazakhstan	16 November 2014	2014 World Championships
Universiade records	Snatch	Russia (RUS)	Tatiana Kashirina	142 kg	Kazan, Russia	11 July 2013	2013 Summer Universiade
Universiade records	Clean & Jerk	Russia (RUS)	Tatiana Kashirina	177 kg	Kazan, Russia	11 July 2013	2013 Summer Universiade
Universiade records	Total	Russia (RUS)	Tatiana Kashirina	319 kg	Kazan, Russia	11 July 2013	2013 Summer Universiade

== Results ==
Rank	Athlete	Group	Body weight	Snatch (kg)				Clean & Jerk (kg)				Total
Rank	Athlete	Group	Body weight	1	2	3	Result	1	2	3	Result	Total
1st place, gold medalist(s)	Kim Kuk-hyang (PRK)	A	99.51	121	126	132	132	160	167	~~170~~	167	299
2nd place, silver medalist(s)	Chitchanok Pulsabsakul (THA)	A	122.91	~~120~~	120	~~125~~	120	140	150	~~156~~	150	270
3rd place, bronze medalist(s)	Mercy Brown (GBR)	A	95.53	98	~~103~~	~~104~~	98	125	134	136	136	234
4	Ko A-rang (KOR)	A	117.37	~~100~~	100	103	103	122	128	129	129	232
5	Gladis G. Bueno (MEX)	A	117.83	98	102	104	104	~~126~~	~~127~~	127	127	231
6	Nurul Akmal (INA)	A	108.89	95	~~100~~	~~103~~	95	125	131	~~138~~	131	226
7	Hanna Makarova (UKR)	A	119.39	86	90	92	92	119	~~129~~	~~129~~	119	211
8	Chung Yun-ling (TPE)	A	99.67	~~95~~	95	~~102~~	95	115	~~120~~	~~125~~	115	210
