= 2018 World Weightlifting Championships – Women's +87 kg =

The women's +87 kg competition at the 2018 World Weightlifting Championships was held on 9–10 November 2018.

== Schedule ==
Date	Time	Event
9 November 2018	10:00	Group C
10 November 2018	10:00	Group B
10 November 2018	14:25	Group A

== Medalists ==
Event	Gold		Silver		Bronze	
Snatch	Tatiana Kashirina (RUS)	145 kg	Meng Suping (CHN)	143 kg	Kim Kuk-hyang (PRK)	130 kg
Clean & Jerk	Tatiana Kashirina (RUS)	185 kg	Meng Suping (CHN)	184 kg	Kim Kuk-hyang (PRK)	165 kg
Total	Tatiana Kashirina (RUS)	330 kg	Meng Suping (CHN)	327 kg	Kim Kuk-hyang (PRK)	295 kg

== Records ==
Prior to this competition, the existing world records were as follows.

World Record	Snatch	World Standard	143 kg	—	1 November 2018
World Record	Clean & Jerk	World Standard	177 kg	—	1 November 2018
World Record	Total	World Standard	320 kg	—	1 November 2018

== Results ==
Rank	Athlete	Group	Snatch (kg)				Clean & Jerk (kg)				Total
Rank	Athlete	Group	1	2	3	Rank	1	2	3	Rank	Total
1st place, gold medalist(s)	Tatiana Kashirina (RUS)	A	140	~~145~~	145	1st place, gold medalist(s)	178	182	185	1st place, gold medalist(s)	330
2nd place, silver medalist(s)	Meng Suping (CHN)	A	135	140	143	2nd place, silver medalist(s)	175	184	~~188~~	2nd place, silver medalist(s)	327
3rd place, bronze medalist(s)	Kim Kuk-hyang (PRK)	A	123	126	130	3rd place, bronze medalist(s)	160	165	~~168~~	3rd place, bronze medalist(s)	295
4	Sarah Robles (USA)	A	120	125	128	4	154	159	162	4	290
5	Lee Hui-sol (KOR)	B	115	120	~~125~~	7	~~145~~	145	152	5	272
6	Anastasiya Lysenko (UKR)	B	115	~~119~~	119	8	140	145	148	8	267
7	Shaimaa Khalaf (EGY)	A	110	115	117	9	150	~~152~~	~~152~~	7	267
8	Son Young-hee (KOR)	A	~~115~~	115	~~123~~	11	152	~~158~~	~~159~~	6	267
9	Tania Mascorro (MEX)	B	118	121	~~125~~	6	~~145~~	~~145~~	145	10	266
10	Verónica Saladín (DOM)	A	118	122	~~126~~	5	142	~~146~~	~~146~~	12	264
11	Lisseth Ayoví (ECU)	B	110	~~115~~	116	10	140	~~145~~	~~145~~	14	256
12	Nurul Akmal (INA)	B	105	~~110~~	~~110~~	16	138	143	146	9	251
13	Iuniarra Sipaia (SAM)	B	102	107	~~111~~	14	135	140	143	11	250
14	Emily Campbell (GBR)	C	104	108	~~111~~	12	136	140	~~143~~	13	248
15	Alexandra Aborneva (KAZ)	C	100	105	~~108~~	15	130	~~135~~	135	16	240
16	Arpine Dalalyan (ARM)	C	94	97	101	19	130	138	~~141~~	15	239
17	Aizada Muptilda (KAZ)	C	100	105	108	13	130	~~135~~	~~135~~	18	238
18	Aleksandra Mierzejewska (POL)	B	100	~~105~~	105	17	125	130	~~135~~	19	235
19	Magdalena Karolak (POL)	B	100	104	~~106~~	18	127	~~132~~	~~132~~	21	231
20	Zeng Ya-li (TPE)	C	90	~~95~~	95	22	125	130	134	17	229
21	Kuinini Manumua (TGA)	C	~~98~~	~~98~~	98	21	125	129	~~132~~	20	227
22	Melike Günal (TUR)	C	95	~~100~~	100	20	123	~~128~~	~~129~~	22	223
23	Tereza Králová (CZE)	C	76	~~79~~	~~80~~	23	87	91	94	23	170
DQ	Duangaksorn Chaidee (THA)	A	120	125	129	—	162	167	~~170~~	—	—
DQ	Chitchanok Pulsabsakul (THA)	B	120	125	127	—	144	147	153	—	—

== New records ==
Snatch	145 kg	Tatiana Kashirina (RUS)	WR
Clean & Jerk	178 kg	Tatiana Kashirina (RUS)	WR
Clean & Jerk	182 kg	Tatiana Kashirina (RUS)	WR
Clean & Jerk	184 kg	Meng Suping (CHN)	WR
Clean & Jerk	185 kg	Tatiana Kashirina (RUS)	WR
Total	323 kg	Tatiana Kashirina (RUS)	WR
Total	327 kg	Tatiana Kashirina (RUS)	WR
Total	330 kg	Tatiana Kashirina (RUS)	WR
