= 2021 World Weightlifting Championships – Women's +87 kg =

Weightlifting Championship

The women's +87 kilograms competition at the 2021 World Weightlifting Championships was held on 16 and 17 December 2021.

== Schedule ==
Date	Time	Event
16 December 2021	10:30	Group B
17 December 2021	13:00	Group A

== Medalists ==
Event	Gold		Silver		Bronze	
Snatch	Duangaksorn Chaidee (THA)	124 kg	Son Young-hee (KOR)	123 kg	Emily Campbell (GBR)	121 kg
Clean & Jerk	Son Young-hee (KOR)	159 kg	Emily Campbell (GBR)	157 kg	Duangaksorn Chaidee (THA)	157 kg
Total	Son Young-hee (KOR)	282 kg	Duangaksorn Chaidee (THA)	281 kg	Emily Campbell (GBR)	278 kg

== Records ==
Prior to this competition, the existing world records were as follows.

World Record	Snatch	Li Wenwen (CHN)	148 kg	Tashkent, Uzbekistan	25 April 2021
World Record	Clean & Jerk	Li Wenwen (CHN)	187 kg	Tashkent, Uzbekistan	25 April 2021
World Record	Total	Li Wenwen (CHN)	335 kg	Tashkent, Uzbekistan	25 April 2021

== Results ==
Rank	Athlete	Group	Snatch (kg)				Clean & Jerk (kg)				Total
Rank	Athlete	Group	1	2	3	Rank	1	2	3	Rank	Total
1st place, gold medalist(s)	Son Young-hee (KOR)	A	116	120	123	2nd place, silver medalist(s)	156	159	~~162~~	1st place, gold medalist(s)	282
2nd place, silver medalist(s)	Duangaksorn Chaidee (THA)	A	119	122	124	1st place, gold medalist(s)	153	~~156~~	157	3rd place, bronze medalist(s)	281
3rd place, bronze medalist(s)	Emily Campbell (GBR)	A	115	118	121	3rd place, bronze medalist(s)	~~155~~	157	~~162~~	2nd place, silver medalist(s)	278
4	Aizada Muptilda (KAZ)	A	115	118	120	4	148	152	~~158~~	4	272
5	Sarah Robles (USA)	A	115	~~120~~	~~121~~	5	146	~~151~~	151	5	266
6	Nurul Akmal (INA)	A	107	~~112~~	112	7	145	~~151~~	~~151~~	6	257
7	Lisseth Ayoví (ECU)	A	110	~~116~~	~~116~~	8	130	136	140	7	250
8	Yaniuska Espinosa (VEN)	B	100	~~105~~	105	9	127	~~132~~	135	9	240
9	Wang Ling-chen (TPE)	A	~~100~~	100	~~107~~	11	125	130	136	8	236
10	Purnima Pandey (IND)	B	95	99	102	10	120	124	127	10	229
11	Fatemeh Yousefi (IRI)	B	85	89	93	12	115	121	126	11	219
12	Scarleth Ucelo (GUA)	B	82	~~88~~	~~88~~	13	~~120~~	120	~~125~~	12	202
13	Trimalee Haputenne (SRI)	B	75	~~81~~	81	14	100	104	106	13	187
—	Halima Abdelazim (EGY)	A	~~115~~	~~115~~	115	6	~~145~~	~~145~~	~~146~~	—	—
