= 2022 World Weightlifting Championships – Women's +87 kg =

The women's +87 kilograms competition at the 2022 World Weightlifting Championships was held on 15 December 2022.

== Schedule ==
Date	Time	Event
15 December 2022	11:30	Group B
15 December 2022	16:30	Group A

== Medalists ==
Event	Gold		Silver		Bronze	
Snatch	Li Wenwen (CHN)	141 kg	Sarah Robles (USA)	127 kg	Duangaksorn Chaidee (THA)	126 kg
Clean & Jerk	Li Wenwen (CHN)	170 kg	Emily Campbell (GBR)	165 kg	Duangaksorn Chaidee (THA)	160 kg
Total	Li Wenwen (CHN)	311 kg	Emily Campbell (GBR)	287 kg	Duangaksorn Chaidee (THA)	286 kg

== Records ==
Prior to this competition, the existing world records were as follows.

World Record	Snatch	Li Wenwen (CHN)	148 kg	Tashkent, Uzbekistan	25 April 2021
World Record	Clean & Jerk	Li Wenwen (CHN)	187 kg	Tashkent, Uzbekistan	25 April 2021
World Record	Total	Li Wenwen (CHN)	335 kg	Tashkent, Uzbekistan	25 April 2021

== Results ==
Rank	Athlete	Group	Snatch (kg)				Clean & Jerk (kg)				Total
Rank	Athlete	Group	1	2	3	Rank	1	2	3	Rank	Total
1st place, gold medalist(s)	Li Wenwen (CHN)	A	130	~~141~~	141	1st place, gold medalist(s)	166	170	—	1st place, gold medalist(s)	311
2nd place, silver medalist(s)	Emily Campbell (GBR)	A	119	122	~~125~~	5	~~157~~	161	165	2nd place, silver medalist(s)	287
3rd place, bronze medalist(s)	Duangaksorn Chaidee (THA)	A	120	124	126	3rd place, bronze medalist(s)	155	158	160	3rd place, bronze medalist(s)	286
4	Sarah Robles (USA)	A	120	125	127	2nd place, silver medalist(s)	~~151~~	151	155	7	282
5	Son Young-hee (KOR)	A	116	121	~~124~~	6	156	159	~~161~~	4	280
6	Halima Abdelazim (EGY)	A	118	122	~~125~~	4	148	153	~~157~~	8	275
7	Lisseth Ayoví (ECU)	A	110	115	120	7	145	151	155	6	275
8	Park Hye-jeong (KOR)	A	~~115~~	115	119	8	155	~~159~~	~~161~~	5	274
9	Nurul Akmal (INA)	A	105	110	115	10	~~145~~	145	~~150~~	10	260
10	Crismery Santana (DOM)	A	112	116	~~119~~	9	138	141	—	12	257
11	Lyubov Kovalchuk (KAZ)	B	~~108~~	110	~~114~~	13	140	~~146~~	146	9	256
12	Naryury Pérez (VEN)	B	110	114	~~116~~	11	~~135~~	135	141	11	255
13	Yaniuska Espinosa (VEN)	B	110	~~114~~	~~114~~	12	133	~~136~~	—	13	243
14	Sarah Fischer (AUT)	B	99	103	106	14	128	132	~~136~~	14	238
15	Yuna Nakajima (JPN)	B	98	~~103~~	~~103~~	15	~~125~~	125	~~135~~	16	223
16	Tereza Králová (CZE)	B	80	85	88	16	100	107	~~114~~	17	195
17	Ligare Makungu (KEN)	B	71	74	~~78~~	17	95	~~100~~	~~102~~	18	169
—	Emma Friesen (CAN)	B	~~106~~	~~107~~	~~107~~	—	~~125~~	125	~~130~~	15	—
—	Kuinini Manumua (TGA)	B	—	—	—	—	—	—	—	—	—
