= Park Hye-jeong =

South Korean weightlifter (born 2003)

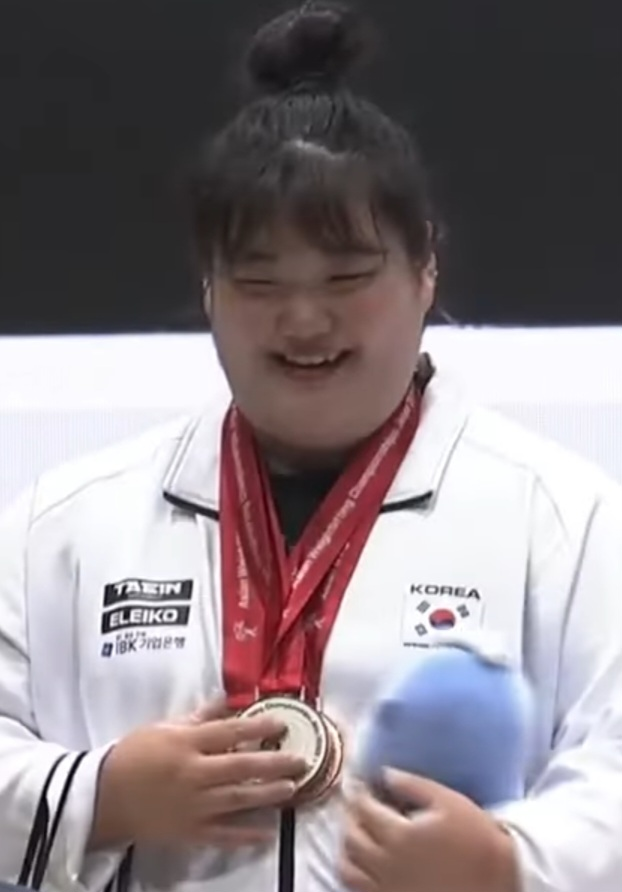

Personal information
- Citizenship: South Korea
- Born: 12 March 2003 (age 23) Ansan, South Korea

Sport
- Sport: Weightlifting
- Weight class: +87 kg
Medal record
Women's weightlifting
Representing South Korea
Olympic Games
Silver medal – second place	2024 Paris	+81 kg
World Championships
Gold medal – first place	2023 Riyadh	+87 kg
Gold medal – first place	2025 Førde	+86 kg
Silver medal – second place	2024 Manama	+87 kg
Silver medal – second place	2026 Ningbo	+86 kg
Asian Games
Gold medal – first place	2022 Hangzhou	+87 kg
Silver medal – second place	2026 Aichi–Nagoya	+86 kg
Asian Championships
Gold medal – first place	2024 Tashkent	+87 kg
Silver medal – second place	2023 Jinju	+87 kg
Silver medal – second place	2025 Jiangshan	+87 kg
Bronze medal – third place	2026 Gandhinagar	+86 kg

Park Hye-jeong (Korean: 박혜정, born March 12, 2003) is a South Korean weightlifter who won a silver medal at the 2024 Olympic Games and two gold medals at the World Weightlifting Championships.

== Career ==
Park began her career as a weightlifter in Ansan when she was in her first year at Seonbu Middle School. In 2019, she was selected for the South Korean youth national team and participated in the 2019 Asian Youth Athletics Championships held in Pyongyang. She set new youth records with 110 kg in snatch, 145 kg in clean and jerk, and 255 kg in total, defeating Aysamal Sansizbayeva (Kazakhstan) and Tang Zhiji (Taipei, China) to win the title.

Selected as a member of the 2022 junior national team, she participated in the 2022 Junior World Weightlifting Championships held in Heraklion, Greece and won gold medals with records of 120 kg in snatch, 161 kg in clean and jerk. In July, she competed at the 2022 Asian Junior Championships in Tashkent, Uzbekistan, where she won gold medals, defeating Sansizbayeva with records of 115 kg in snatch, 155 kg in clean and jerk, and 270 kg in total.

She was selected for the senior national team and qualified for the 2022 World Weightlifting Championships, Colombia in December. In this competition, she ranked 8th with 119 kg in snatch, 155 kg in clean and jerk, and 274 kg in total. The following year, in May 2023, she competed at the 2023 Asian Championships in Jinju, South Korea, winning silver medals with records of 127 kg in snatch, 168 kg in clean and jerk, and 295 kg total. Later, at the 2023 World Weightlifting Championships held in Riyadh, Saudi Arabia in September, she took first place in both the snatch and clean and jerk with a weight of 123 kg, a clean and jerk of 165 kg, and a total of 289 kg.

== Olympics competition ==
Park competed at the 2024 Summer Olympics in Paris, France. She lifted 131 kg for the snatch (which was her personal record), then 168 kg for the clean and jerk. Her total score of 299 points won her a silver medal and set a new lifting score record for South Korea. Park shared the podium with China's Li Wenwen, who won the gold medal, and Great Britain's Emily Campbell, who won the bronze medal. After the competition, Park posted on Instagram:

"There were a lot of things that happened in preparation for the Paris Olympics. Thanks to the staff of the Weightlifting Federation, the coach, and my loving family, I think I was able to get to this place by overcoming the hard things... Thanks to this Olympics, I think I gained strength that I never had thanks to the support and advice of many people and the loud cheers of those who came to the stadium." (English translation)

In her Instagram post, Park said she is planning on competing in the next Olympics competition in 2028. She wrote:

"I would like to ask you a lot of interest in Korean weightlifting from now on, and I will do my best to aim for a gold medal at the LA Olympics." (English translation)

== Weightlifting style ==
Park's weightlifting technique stands out among her competitors. At the 2024 IWF World Cup in Thailand—the last chance qualifier for the Olympic Games—her clean and jerk skill was described as "a different technique that only she knows about" that is "solid," "energetic," and "precise."

== Reality television appearances ==
In 2024, Park appeared in episode #519 of I Live Alone, a popular and long-running Korean reality series where she showed her daily routine living in an athletes' dorm, training among male weightlifting competitors, and taking direction from her coach. She also appeared in episodes #263-264 of Boss in the Mirror, another Korean reality show. She appeared in episodes 716 and 736 of Running Man.

== Major results ==
Year	Venue	Weight	Snatch (kg)				Clean & jerk (kg)				Total	Rank
Year	Venue	Weight	1	2	3	Rank	1	2	3	Rank	Total	Rank
Summer Olympics
2024	Paris, France	+81 kg	123	127	131	—N/a	163	168	~~173~~	—N/a	299	2nd place, silver medalist(s)
World Championships
2022	Bogotá, Colombia	+87 kg	~~115~~	115	119	8	155	~~159~~	~~161~~	5	274	8
2023	Riyadh, Saudi Arabia	+87 kg	120	124	~~131~~	1st place, gold medalist(s)	~~158~~	158	165	1st place, gold medalist(s)	289	1st place, gold medalist(s)
2024	Manama, Bahrain	+87 kg	119	124	~~130~~	2nd place, silver medalist(s)	161	171	~~176~~	2nd place, silver medalist(s)	295	2nd place, silver medalist(s)
2025	Førde, Norway	+86 kg	120	125	~~130~~	1st place, gold medalist(s)	158	~~166~~	—	1st place, gold medalist(s)	283	1st place, gold medalist(s)
IWF World Cup
2024	Phuket, Thailand	+87 kg	123	128	130	2nd place, silver medalist(s)	166	~~169~~	~~171~~	2nd place, silver medalist(s)	296	2nd place, silver medalist(s)
Asian Games
2023	Hangzhou, China	+87 kg	118	123	125	—N/a	157	160	169	—N/a	294	1st place, gold medalist(s)
Asian Championships
2023	Jinju, South Korea	+87 kg	118	125	127	2nd place, silver medalist(s)	158	165	168	3rd place, bronze medalist(s)	295	2nd place, silver medalist(s)
2024	Tashkent, Uzbekistan	+87 kg	118	123	128	1st place, gold medalist(s)	160	165	~~171~~	1st place, gold medalist(s)	293	1st place, gold medalist(s)
2025	Jiangshan, China	+87 kg	120	~~125~~	125	2nd place, silver medalist(s)	155	160	~~163~~	3rd place, bronze medalist(s)	285	2nd place, silver medalist(s)
