= Weightlifting at the 2018 Commonwealth Games – Women's +90 kg =

Weightlifting – Women's +90 kg at the 2018 Commonwealth Games
- Venue: Carrara Sports and Leisure Centre
- Dates: 9 April 2018
- Competitors: 8 from 8 nations
- Winning total weight: 253

Medalists
gold medal	Feagaiga Stowers	Samoa
silver medal	Charisma Amoe-Tarrant	Nauru
bronze medal	Emily Campbell	England

The Women's +90 kg weightlifting event at the 2018 Commonwealth Games took place at the Carrara Sports and Leisure Centre on 9 April 2018. The weightlifter from Samoa won the gold, with a combined lift of 253 kg.

== Records ==
Prior to this competition, the existing world, Commonwealth and Games records were as follows:

World record	Snatch	Tatiana Kashirina (RUS)	155 kg	Almaty, Kazakhstan	16 November 2014
World record	Clean & Jerk	Tatiana Kashirina (RUS)	193 kg	Almaty, Kazakhstan	16 November 2014
World record	Total	Tatiana Kashirina (RUS)	348 kg	Almaty, Kazakhstan	16 November 2014
Commonwealth record	Snatch	Laurel Hubbard (NZL)	131 kg	Auckland, New Zealand	11 June 2017
Commonwealth record	Clean & Jerk	Ele Opeloge (SAM)	161 kg	Mont-Dore, France	7 September 2011
Commonwealth record	Total	Ele Opeloge (SAM)	285 kg	New Delhi, India	10 October 2010
Games record	Snatch	Ele Opeloge (SAM)	125 kg	New Delhi, India	10 October 2010
Games record	Clean & Jerk	Ele Opeloge (SAM)	160 kg	New Delhi, India	10 October 2010
Games record	Total	Ele Opeloge (SAM)	285 kg	New Delhi, India	10 October 2010

== Schedule ==
All times are Australian Eastern Standard Time (UTC+10)

Date	Time	Round
Saturday, 9 April 2018	14:00	Final

== Results ==
Rank	Athlete	Body weight (kg)	Snatch (kg)				Clean & Jerk (kg)				Total
Rank	Athlete	Body weight (kg)	1	2	3	Result	1	2	3	Result	Total
1st place, gold medalist(s)	Feagaiga Stowers (SAM)	114.39	108	113	~~120~~	113	135	140	~~145~~	140	253
2nd place, silver medalist(s)	Charisma Amoe-Tarrant (NRU)	128.83	98	~~101~~	101	101	130	136	142	142	243
3rd place, bronze medalist(s)	Emily Campbell (ENG)	113.36	~~99~~	99	103	103	~~129~~	129	139	139	242
4	Deborah Acason (AUS)	93.45	95	99	101	101	120	125	~~127~~	125	226
5	Luisa Peters (COK)	100.16	100	~~103~~	~~103~~	100	120	125	~~127~~	125	225
6	Purnima Pandey (IND)	90.29	85	89	94	94	110	115	118	118	212
7	Shalinee Valaydon (MRI)	114.57	90	~~95~~	95	95	110	~~115~~	-	110	205
	Laurel Hubbard (NZL)	142.32	120	~~127~~	~~132~~	120	-	-	-	–	DNF
