= 6th International Qatar Cup =

- Location: Doha, Qatar
- Dates: 20–23 December
- Competitors: 134

The 6th International Qatar Cup was held in Doha, Qatar from 20 to 23 December 2019.

== Medal overview ==
=== Men ===
Event		Gold		Silver		Bronze	
– 61 kg	Snatch	Seýitjan Mirzaýew (TKM)	125 kg	Igor Son (KAZ)	124 kg	Davide Ruiu (ITA)	117 kg
– 61 kg	Clean & Jerk	Igor Son (KAZ)	154 kg	Davide Ruiu (ITA)	153 kg	Seýitjan Mirzaýew (TKM)	145 kg
– 61 kg	Total	Igor Son (KAZ)	278 kg	Seýitjan Mirzaýew (TKM)	270 kg	Davide Ruiu (ITA)	270 kg
– 67 kg	Snatch	Mirko Zanni (ITA)	147 kg	Jeremy Lalrinnunga (IND)	140 kg	Bernardin Matam (FRA)	133 kg
– 67 kg	Clean & Jerk	Mirko Zanni (ITA)	173 kg	Bernardin Matam (FRA)	170 kg	Jeremy Lalrinnunga (IND)	166 kg
– 67 kg	Total	Mirko Zanni (ITA)	320 kg	Jeremy Lalrinnunga (IND)	306 kg	Bernardin Matam (FRA)	303 kg
– 73 kg	Snatch	Daniyar İsmayilov (TUR)	156 kg	Max Lang (GER)	150 kg	Briken Calja (ALB)	147 kg
– 73 kg	Clean & Jerk	Daniyar İsmayilov (TUR)	188 kg	Doston Yokubov (UZB)	181 kg	Briken Calja (ALB)	180 kg
– 73 kg	Total	Daniyar İsmayilov (TUR)	344 kg	Max Lang (GER)	330 kg	Briken Calja (ALB)	327 kg
– 81 kg	Snatch	Nico Müller (GER)	160 kg	Ritvars Suharevs (LAT)	160 kg	Erkand Qerimaj (ALB)	157 kg
– 81 kg	Clean & Jerk	Nico Müller (GER)	195 kg	Sarvarbek Zafarjonov (UZB)	194 kg	Erkand Qerimaj (ALB)	194 kg
– 81 kg	Total	Nico Müller (GER)	355 kg	Erkand Qerimaj (ALB)	351 kg	Ritvars Suharevs (LAT)	348 kg
– 96 kg	Snatch	Kianoush Rostami (IRI)	178 kg	Faris Ibrahim (QAT)	176 kg	Bekdoolot Rasulbekov (KGZ)	165 kg
– 96 kg	Clean & Jerk	Faris Ibrahim (QAT)	228 kg	Kianoush Rostami (IRI)	225 kg	Ali Miri (IRI)	209 kg
– 96 kg	Total	Faris Ibrahim (QAT)	404 kg	Kianoush Rostami (IRI)	403 kg	Ali Miri (IRI)	371 kg
– 109 kg	Snatch	Akbar Djuraev (UZB)	185 kg	Hristo Hristov (BUL)	184 kg	Ibragim Bersanov (KAZ)	180 kg
– 109 kg	Clean & Jerk	Akbar Djuraev (UZB)	220 kg	Hristo Hristov (BUL)	216 kg	Artūrs Plēsnieks (LAT)	215 kg
– 109 kg	Total	Akbar Djuraev (UZB)	405 kg	Hristo Hristov (BUL)	400 kg	Timur Naniev (RUS)	391 kg
+ 109 kg	Snatch	Gor Minasyan (ARM)	198 kg	Walid Bidani (ALG)	190 kg	Ruben Aleksanyan (ARM)	180 kg
+ 109 kg	Clean & Jerk	Ruben Aleksanyan (ARM)	236 kg	David Liti (NZL)	231 kg	Gor Minasyan (ARM)	226 kg
+ 109 kg	Total	Gor Minasyan (ARM)	424 kg	Ruben Aleksanyan (ARM)	416 kg	Walid Bidani (ALG)	415 kg

=== Women ===
Event		Gold		Silver		Bronze	
– 49 kg	Snatch	Saikhom Mirabai Chanu (IND)	83 kg	Anaïs Michel (FRA)	77 kg	Manon Lorentz (FRA)	74 kg
– 49 kg	Clean & Jerk	Saikhom Mirabai Chanu (IND)	111 kg	Ýulduz Jumabaýewa (TKM)	97 kg	Anaïs Michel (FRA)	95 kg
– 49 kg	Total	Saikhom Mirabai Chanu (IND)	194 kg	Anaïs Michel (FRA)	172 kg	Ýulduz Jumabaýewa (TKM)	166 kg
– 55 kg	Snatch	Kamila Konotop (UKR)	92 kg	Muattar Nabieva (UZB)	89 kg	Lucrezia Magistris (ITA)	87 kg
– 55 kg	Clean & Jerk	Muattar Nabieva (UZB)	114 kg	Kamila Konotop (UKR)	110 kg	Lucrezia Magistris (ITA)	105 kg
– 55 kg	Total	Muattar Nabieva (UZB)	203 kg	Kamila Konotop (UKR)	202 kg	Lucrezia Magistris (ITA)	192 kg
– 59 kg	Snatch	Boyanka Kostova (AZE)	101 kg	Rebeka Koha (LAT)	100 kg	Irina Lepșa (ROU)	95 kg
– 59 kg	Clean & Jerk	Boyanka Kostova (AZE)	120 kg	Rebeka Koha (LAT)	119 kg	Irina Lepșa (ROU)	115 kg
– 59 kg	Total	Boyanka Kostova (AZE)	221 kg	Rebeka Koha (LAT)	219 kg	Irina Lepșa (ROU)	210 kg
– 64 kg	Snatch	Giorgia Bordignon (ITA)	100 kg	Choe Hyo-sim (PRK)	99 kg	Kumushkhon Fayzullaeva (UZB)	96 kg
– 64 kg	Clean & Jerk	Choe Hyo-sim (PRK)	130 kg	Rakhi Halder (IND)	123 kg	Giorgia Bordignon (ITA)	121 kg
– 64 kg	Total	Choe Hyo-sim (PRK)	229 kg	Giorgia Bordignon (ITA)	221 kg	Rakhi Halder (IND)	218 kg
– 76 kg	Snatch	Iryna Dekha (UKR)	112 kg	Tursunoy Jabborova (UZB)	104 kg	Mönkhjantsangiin Ankhtsetseg (MGL)	102 kg
– 76 kg	Clean & Jerk	Iryna Dekha (UKR)	135 kg	Patricia Strenius (SWE)	130 kg	Mönkhjantsangiin Ankhtsetseg (MGL)	124 kg
– 76 kg	Total	Iryna Dekha (UKR)	247 kg	Patricia Strenius (SWE)	230 kg	Mönkhjantsangiin Ankhtsetseg (MGL)	226 kg
– 87 kg	Snatch	Tatev Hakobyan (ARM)	105 kg	Patricia Rieger (GER)	100 kg	Raushan Meshitkhanova (KAZ)	99 kg
– 87 kg	Clean & Jerk	Gaëlle Nayo-Ketchanke (FRA)	128 kg	Tatev Hakobyan (ARM)	127 kg	Patricia Rieger (GER)	120 kg
– 87 kg	Total	Tatev Hakobyan (ARM)	232 kg	Gaëlle Nayo-Ketchanke (FRA)	223 kg	Patricia Rieger (GER)	220 kg
+ 87 kg	Snatch	Laurel Hubbard (NZL)	132 kg	Nurul Akmal (INA)	113 kg	Charisma Amoe-Tarrant (AUS)	110 kg
+ 87 kg	Clean & Jerk	Charisma Amoe-Tarrant (AUS)	152 kg	Nurul Akmal (INA)	148 kg	Laurel Hubbard (NZL)	143 kg
+ 87 kg	Total	Laurel Hubbard (NZL)	275 kg	Charisma Amoe-Tarrant (AUS)	262 kg	Nurul Akmal (INA)	261 kg
