= 2024 World Weightlifting Championships – Women's +87 kg =

Women's +87 kg at the 2024 World Weightlifting Championships
- Venue: Weightlifting Marquee Venue
- Location: Manama, Bahrain
- Dates: 15 December
- Competitors: 16 from 15 nations
- Winning total: 324 kg

Medalists
gold medal	Li Yan	China
silver medal	Park Hye-jeong	South Korea
bronze medal	Son Young-hee	South Korea

The women's +87 kilograms competition at the 2024 World Weightlifting Championships was held on 15 December 2024.

== Schedule ==
Date	Time	Event
15 December 2024	11:00	Group B
15 December 2024	15:00	Group A

== Records ==
Prior to this competition, the existing world records were as follows.

World Record	Snatch	Li Wenwen (CHN)	148 kg	Tashkent, Uzbekistan	25 April 2021
World Record	Clean & Jerk	Li Wenwen (CHN)	187 kg	Tashkent, Uzbekistan	25 April 2021
World Record	Total	Li Wenwen (CHN)	335 kg	Tashkent, Uzbekistan	25 April 2021

== Results ==
Rank	Athlete	Group	Snatch (kg)				Clean & Jerk (kg)				Total
Rank	Athlete	Group	1	2	3	Rank	1	2	3	Rank	Total
1st place, gold medalist(s)	Li Yan (CHN)	A	135	142	149 CWR	1st place, gold medalist(s)	160	170	175	1st place, gold medalist(s)	324
2nd place, silver medalist(s)	Park Hye-jeong (KOR)	A	119	124	~~130~~	2nd place, silver medalist(s)	161	171	~~176~~	2nd place, silver medalist(s)	295
3rd place, bronze medalist(s)	Son Young-hee (KOR)	A	118	~~123~~	~~123~~	3rd place, bronze medalist(s)	156	162	~~172~~	3rd place, bronze medalist(s)	280
4	Marifélix Sarría (CUB)	A	~~110~~	110	~~115~~	7	150	157	~~161~~	4	267
5	Wang Ling-chen (TPE)	A	110	~~115~~	115	5	142	~~149~~	149	6	264
6	Lyubov Kovalchuk (KAZ)	A	113	~~117~~	~~117~~	6	145	150	~~155~~	5	263
7	Etta Love (CAN)	B	~~105~~	~~106~~	106	9	132	136	~~140~~	7	242
8	Arantzazu Pavez (CHI)	B	100	106	~~111~~	8	128	135	~~138~~	9	241
9	Nurul Akmal (INA)	A	~~105~~	105	~~107~~	10	~~136~~	136	~~140~~	8	241
10	Krystyna Borodina (UKR)	B	~~98~~	98	103	11	128	~~132~~	~~132~~	10	231
11	Sarah Fischer (AUT)	B	98	~~101~~	~~101~~	14	128	—	—	11	226
12	Dzhesika Ivanova (BUL)	B	~~94~~	94	99	13	117	123	~~126~~	12	222
13	Erla Ágústsdóttir (ISL)	B	93	98	102	12	113	116	119	13	221
14	Tereza Králová (CZE)	B	88	92	~~95~~	15	~~110~~	110	115	14	207
15	Marie Agbah-Hughes (GHA)	B	65	~~68~~	68	16	~~88~~	88	91	15	159
—	Emily Campbell (GBR)	A	118	~~120~~	—	4	—	—	—	—	—
