= Weightlifting at the 2018 Asian Games – Women's +75 kg =

Women's +75 kg at the 2018 Asian Games
- Venue: Jakarta International Expo
- Date: 27 August 2018
- Competitors: 6 from 4 nations

Medalists
gold medal	Kim Kuk-hyang	North Korea
silver medal	Son Young-hee	South Korea
bronze medal	Duangaksorn Chaidee	Thailand

The women's +75 kilograms event at the 2018 Asian Games took place on 27 August 2018 at the Jakarta International Expo Hall A.

== Schedule ==
All times are Western Indonesia Time (UTC+07:00)

Date	Time	Event
Monday, 27 August 2018	17:00	Group A

== Records ==
Prior to this competition, the existing world, Asian and Games records were as follows.

World Record	Snatch	Tatiana Kashirina (RUS)	155 kg	Almaty, Kazakhstan	16 November 2014
World Record	Clean & Jerk	Tatiana Kashirina (RUS)	193 kg	Almaty, Kazakhstan	16 November 2014
World Record	Total	Tatiana Kashirina (RUS)	348 kg	Almaty, Kazakhstan	16 November 2014
Asian Record	Snatch	Zhou Lulu (CHN)	146 kg	Paris, France	13 November 2011
Asian Record	Clean & Jerk	Zhou Lulu (CHN)	192 kg	Incheon, South Korea	26 September 2014
Asian Record	Total	Zhou Lulu (CHN)	334 kg	Incheon, South Korea	26 September 2014
Games Record	Snatch	Zhou Lulu (CHN)	142 kg	Incheon, South Korea	26 September 2014
Games Record	Clean & Jerk	Zhou Lulu (CHN)	192 kg	Incheon, South Korea	26 September 2014
Games Record	Total	Zhou Lulu (CHN)	334 kg	Incheon, South Korea	26 September 2014

== Results ==
Rank	Athlete	Group	Snatch (kg)				Clean & Jerk (kg)				Total
Rank	Athlete	Group	1	2	3	Result	1	2	3	Result	Total
1st place, gold medalist(s)	Kim Kuk-hyang (PRK)	A	120	123	126	126	160	165	~~167~~	165	291
2nd place, silver medalist(s)	Son Young-hee (KOR)	A	116	120	122	122	155	160	~~165~~	160	282
3rd place, bronze medalist(s)	Duangaksorn Chaidee (THA)	A	114	118	121	121	154	157	159	159	280
4	Lee Hui-sol (KOR)	A	118	122	~~124~~	122	150	155	157	157	279
5	Chitchanok Pulsabsakul (THA)	A	117	121	~~125~~	121	147	~~152~~	~~152~~	147	268
6	Nurul Akmal (INA)	A	108	112	116	116	137	~~147~~	~~147~~	137	253
