= 2025 World Weightlifting Championships – Women's +86 kg =

Women's +86 kg at the 2025 World Weightlifting Championships
- Venue: Førdehuset
- Location: Førde, Norway
- Dates: 11 October
- Winning total: 283 kg

Medalists
gold medal	Park Hye-jeong	South Korea
silver medal	Marifélix Sarría	Cuba
bronze medal	Mary Theisen-Lappen	United States

The women's +86 kilograms competition at the 2025 World Weightlifting Championships was held on 11 October 2025.

== Schedule ==
Date	Time	Event
11 October 2025	11:00	Group B
11 October 2025	13:30	Group A

== Records ==
Prior to this competition, the existing world records were as follows.

World record	Snatch	World Standard	144 kg	—	1 June 2025
World record	Clean & Jerk	World Standard	181 kg	—	1 June 2025
World record	Total	World Standard	325 kg	—	1 June 2025

== Results ==
Rank	Athlete	Group	Snatch (kg)				Clean & Jerk (kg)				Total
Rank	Athlete	Group	1	2	3	Rank	1	2	3	Rank	Total
1st place, gold medalist(s)	Park Hye-jeong (KOR)	A	120	125	~~130~~	1st place, gold medalist(s)	158	~~166~~	—	1st place, gold medalist(s)	283
2nd place, silver medalist(s)	Marifélix Sarría (CUB)	A	113	~~117~~	118	2nd place, silver medalist(s)	~~157~~	157	~~165~~	2nd place, silver medalist(s)	275
3rd place, bronze medalist(s)	Mary Theisen-Lappen (USA)	A	115	~~118~~	~~119~~	5	~~154~~	154	~~159~~	3rd place, bronze medalist(s)	269
4	Emily Campbell (GBR)	A	115	~~118~~	~~119~~	4	153	~~158~~	~~159~~	4	268
5	Zhu Linhan (CHN)	A	110	116	~~120~~	3rd place, bronze medalist(s)	140	~~152~~	~~153~~	6	256
6	Wang Ling-chen (TPE)	A	105	111	~~115~~	7	135	~~138~~	138	7	249
7	Taiane de Lima (BRA)	B	102	105	108	10	134	140	—	5	248
8	Arantzazu Pavez (CHI)	B	105	110	~~113~~	8	130	135	137	8	247
9	Fatmagül Çevik (TUR)	B	107	110 EJR	~~113~~	9	130	134	136 EJR	10	246 EJR
10	Krystyna Borodina (UKR)	B	100	104	106	13	131	136	~~138~~	9	242
11	Kiara Klug (GER)	B	106	~~109~~	111	6	125	130	~~132~~	12	241
12	Mercy Brown (GBR)	B	~~101~~	101	105	14	127	132	~~137~~	11	237
13	Veronika Mitykó (HUN)	B	103	106	108	11	114	118	122	15	230
14	Erla Ágústsdóttir (ISL)	B	100	103	106	12	118	122	~~125~~	14	228
15	Sarah Fischer (AUT)	B	94	97	100	15	120	124	126	13	226
—	Son Young-hee (KOR)	A	—	—	—	—	—	—	—	—	—
—	Lisseth Ayoví (ECU)	A	Did not start								
