= Manumua =

Manumua is a surname. Notable people with the surname include:

- Kuinini Manumua (born 2000), Tongan-American weightlifter
- Tevita Manumua (born 1993), Tongan-born Romanian rugby union player
