= 2017 World Weightlifting Championships – Women's +90 kg =

The Women's +90 kg competition at the 2017 World Weightlifting Championships was held on 5 December 2017.

== Schedule ==
Date	Time	Event
5 December 2017	13:55	Group A

== Medalists ==
Event	Gold		Silver		Bronze	
Snatch	Sarah Robles (USA)	126 kg	Laurel Hubbard (NZL)	124 kg	Tania Mascorro (MEX)	119 kg
Clean & Jerk	Sarah Robles (USA)	158 kg	Shaimaa Khalaf (EGY)	153 kg	Duangaksorn Chaidee (THA)	152 kg
Total	Sarah Robles (USA)	284 kg	Laurel Hubbard (NZL)	275 kg	Shaimaa Khalaf (EGY)	268 kg

== Records ==
Prior to this competition, the existing world records were as follows.

World Record	Snatch	Tatiana Kashirina (RUS)	155 kg	Almaty, Kazakhstan	16 November 2014
World Record	Clean & Jerk	Tatiana Kashirina (RUS)	193 kg	Almaty, Kazakhstan	16 November 2014
World Record	Total	Tatiana Kashirina (RUS)	348 kg	Almaty, Kazakhstan	16 November 2014

== Results ==
Rank	Athlete	Group	Snatch (kg)				Clean & Jerk (kg)				Total
Rank	Athlete	Group	1	2	3	Rank	1	2	3	Rank	Total
1st place, gold medalist(s)	Sarah Robles (USA)	A	118	122	126	1st place, gold medalist(s)	150	154	158	1st place, gold medalist(s)	284
2nd place, silver medalist(s)	Laurel Hubbard (NZL)	A	120	124	~~127~~	2nd place, silver medalist(s)	144	147	151	4	275
3rd place, bronze medalist(s)	Shaimaa Khalaf (EGY)	A	115	~~120~~	~~120~~	4	150	153	~~157~~	2nd place, silver medalist(s)	268
4	Duangaksorn Chaidee (THA)	A	~~115~~	115	~~119~~	5	145	148	152	3rd place, bronze medalist(s)	267
5	Tania Mascorro (MEX)	A	115	119	~~123~~	3rd place, bronze medalist(s)	~~142~~	142	~~146~~	5	261
6	Lisseth Ayoví (ECU)	A	107	111	~~113~~	6	135	140	~~143~~	6	251
7	Aleksandra Mierzejewska (POL)	A	98	102	~~104~~	7	~~130~~	~~130~~	130	7	232
8	Krisztina Magát (HUN)	A	100	~~103~~	~~104~~	8	120	128	~~133~~	8	228
—	Albertine Um (CMR)	A	—	—	—	—	—	—	—	—	—
—	Chitchanok Pulsabsakul (THA)	A	~~116~~	~~116~~	~~117~~	—	—	—	—	—	—
