= Weightlifting at the 2022 Asian Games =

- Venue: Xiaoshan Sports Center Gymnasium
- Dates: 30 September – 7 October 2023
- Competitors: 181 from 29 nations

Weightlifting at the 2022 Asian Games was held at Xiaoshan Sports Center Gymnasium, Xiaoshan District, Hangzhou, China, from 30 September to 7 October 2023.

Originally, the weightlifting competitions were scheduled for the first week of the Games, but due to scheduling reasons and the proximity of the 2023 World Weightlifting Championships in Riyadh, Saudi Arabia, they were rescheduled.

== Schedule ==
B	Group B	A	Group A

Event↓/Date →	30th Sat		1st Sun		2nd Mon		3rd Tue		4th Wed	5th Thu		6th Fri	7th Sat
Men's 61 kg			B	A									
Men's 67 kg			B	A									
Men's 73 kg							B	A					
Men's 81 kg							B		A				
Men's 96 kg										B	A		
Men's 109 kg										B		A	
Men's +109 kg													A
Women's 49 kg	B	A											
Women's 55 kg	B	A											
Women's 59 kg					B	A							
Women's 64 kg					B	A							
Women's 76 kg										A			
Women's 87 kg												A	
Women's +87 kg													A

== Medalists ==
=== Men ===
Event	Gold	Silver	Bronze
61 kg	Li Fabin; China	Pak Myong-jin; North Korea	Kim Chung-guk; North Korea
67 kg	Chen Lijun; China	Ri Won-ju; North Korea	Lee Sang-yeon; South Korea
73 kg	Rahmat Erwin Abdullah; Indonesia	Weeraphon Wichuma; Thailand	Oh Kum-thaek; North Korea
81 kg	Ri Chong-song; North Korea	Mukhammadkodir Toshtemirov; Uzbekistan	Alexandr Uvarov; Kazakhstan
96 kg	Tian Tao; China	Ro Kwang-ryol; North Korea	Sarat Sumpradit; Thailand
109 kg	Liu Huanhua; China	Akbar Djuraev; Uzbekistan	Ruslan Nurudinov; Uzbekistan
+109 kg	Gor Minasyan; Bahrain	Ali Davoudi; Iran	Rustam Djangabaev; Uzbekistan

=== Women ===
Event	Gold	Silver	Bronze
49 kg	Ri Song-gum; North Korea	Jiang Huihua; China	Thanyathon Sukcharoen; Thailand
55 kg	Kang Hyon-gyong; North Korea	Ri Su-yon; North Korea	Hou Zhihui; China
59 kg	Kim Il-gyong; North Korea	Luo Shifang; China	Kuo Hsing-chun; Chinese Taipei
64 kg	Rim Un-sim; North Korea	Pei Xinyi; China	Elreen Ando; Philippines
76 kg	Song Kuk-hyang; North Korea	Jong Chun-hui; North Korea	Kim Su-hyeon; South Korea
87 kg	Liang Xiaomei; China	Yun Ha-je; South Korea	Jung A-ram; South Korea
+87 kg	Park Hye-jeong; South Korea	Son Young-hee; South Korea	Duangaksorn Chaidee; Thailand

== Medal table ==
Rank	Nation	Gold	Silver	Bronze	Total
1	North Korea (PRK)	6	5	2	13
2	China (CHN)	5	3	1	9
3	South Korea (KOR)	1	2	3	6
4	Bahrain (BRN)	1	0	0	1
4	Indonesia (INA)	1	0	0	1
6	Uzbekistan (UZB)	0	2	2	4
7	Thailand (THA)	0	1	3	4
8	Iran (IRI)	0	1	0	1
9	Chinese Taipei (TPE)	0	0	1	1
9	Kazakhstan (KAZ)	0	0	1	1
9	Philippines (PHI)	0	0	1	1
Totals (11 entries)		14	14	14	42

== Participating nations ==
A total of 181 athletes from 29 nations are competing in weightlifting at the 2022 Asian Games:

- Afghanistan (1)
- Bahrain (1)
- Bangladesh (3)
- Brunei (1)
- China (13)
- Chinese Taipei (8)
- India (2)
- Indonesia (9)
- Iran (10)
- Iraq (2)
- Japan (9)
- Jordan (1)
- Kazakhstan (14)
- Kyrgyzstan (5)
- Mongolia (13)
- Nepal (5)
- North Korea (14)
- Oman (2)
- Pakistan (3)
- Palestine (1)
- Philippines (5)
- Saudi Arabia (4)
- South Korea (14)
- Sri Lanka (2)
- Thailand (14)
- Timor-Leste (1)
- Turkmenistan (7)
- Uzbekistan (11)
- Vietnam (6)
