= Weightlifting at the 2024 Summer Olympics – Women's +81 kg =

Women's +81 kg at the Games of the XXXIII Olympiad
- Venue: Paris Expo Porte de Versailles
- Date: 11 August 2024
- Competitors: 12 from 12 nations
- Winning total: 309 kg

Medalists
1st place, gold medalist(s)		Li Wenwen	China
2nd place, silver medalist(s)		Park Hye-jeong	South Korea
3rd place, bronze medalist(s)		Emily Campbell	Great Britain

The Women's +81 kg weightlifting competitions at the 2024 Summer Olympics in Paris took place on 11 August at the Paris Expo Porte de Versailles.

== Records ==
{{{caption}}}
World Record	Snatch	Li Wenwen (CHN)	148 kg	Tashkent, Uzbekistan	25 April 2021
World Record	Clean & Jerk	Li Wenwen (CHN)	187 kg	Tashkent, Uzbekistan	25 April 2021
World Record	Total	Li Wenwen (CHN)	335 kg	Tashkent, Uzbekistan	25 April 2021
Olympic Record	Snatch	Li Wenwen (CHN)	140 kg	Tokyo, Japan	2 August 2021
Olympic Record	Clean & Jerk	Li Wenwen (CHN)	180 kg	Tokyo, Japan	2 August 2021
Olympic Record	Total	Li Wenwen (CHN)	320 kg	Tokyo, Japan	2 August 2021

== Results ==
Rank	Athlete	Nation	Snatch (kg)				Clean & Jerk (kg)				Total
Rank	Athlete	Nation	1	2	3	Result	1	2	3	Result	Total
1st place, gold medalist(s)	Li Wenwen	China	130	136	—	136	167	173	~~174~~	173	309
2nd place, silver medalist(s)	Park Hye-jeong	South Korea	123	127	131	131	163	168	~~173~~	168	299
3rd place, bronze medalist(s)	Emily Campbell	Great Britain	119	123	126	126	162	~~169~~	~~174~~	162	288
4	Lisseth Ayoví	Ecuador	117	121	123	123	156	160	~~162~~	160	283
5	Mary Theisen-Lappen	United States	115	~~118~~	119	119	155	~~162~~	~~165~~	155	274
6	Duangaksorn Chaidee	Thailand	~~120~~	~~120~~	120	120	152	~~156~~	~~160~~	152	272
7	Halima Abbas	Egypt	110	115	~~118~~	115	135	140	145	145	260
8	Naryury Pérez	Venezuela	114	~~117~~	~~117~~	114	~~140~~	145	—	145	259
9	Crismery Santana	Dominican Republic	111	115	118	118	~~140~~	~~140~~	140	140	258
10	Tursunoy Jabborova	Uzbekistan	112	116	118	118	133	~~138~~	~~138~~	133	251
11	Iuniarra Sipaia	Samoa	100	105	~~110~~	105	~~141~~	141	~~148~~	141	246
12	Nurul Akmal	Indonesia	105	~~110~~	~~110~~	105	140	~~145~~	~~151~~	140	245
