= 2014 World Weightlifting Championships – Women's +75 kg =

The women's +75 kilograms event at the 2014 World Weightlifting Championships was held on 15–16 November 2014 in Baluan Sholak Sports Palace, Almaty, Kazakhstan.

== Schedule ==
Date	Time	Event
15 November 2014	09:00	Group C
16 November 2014	09:00	Group B
16 November 2014	14:00	Group A

== Medalists ==
Event	Gold		Silver		Bronze	
Snatch	Tatiana Kashirina (RUS)	155 kg	Meng Suping (CHN)	140 kg	Chitchanok Pulsabsakul (THA)	132 kg
Clean & Jerk	Tatiana Kashirina (RUS)	193 kg	Meng Suping (CHN)	180 kg	Praeonapa Khenjantuek (THA)	163 kg
Total	Tatiana Kashirina (RUS)	348 kg	Meng Suping (CHN)	320 kg	Chitchanok Pulsabsakul (THA)	294 kg

== Records ==
Prior to this competition, the existing world records were as follows.

World Record	Snatch	Tatiana Kashirina (RUS)	151 kg	London, United Kingdom	5 August 2012
World Record	Clean & Jerk	Zhou Lulu (CHN)	192 kg	Incheon, South Korea	26 September 2014
World Record	Total	Tatiana Kashirina (RUS)	334 kg	Moscow, Russia	23 November 2013

== Results ==
Rank	Athlete	Group	Body weight	Snatch (kg)				Clean & Jerk (kg)				Total
Rank	Athlete	Group	Body weight	1	2	3	Rank	1	2	3	Rank	Total
1st place, gold medalist(s)	Tatiana Kashirina (RUS)	A	106.21	145	152	155	1st place, gold medalist(s)	185	193	—	1st place, gold medalist(s)	348
2nd place, silver medalist(s)	Meng Suping (CHN)	A	119.91	130	135	140	2nd place, silver medalist(s)	170	180	~~190~~	2nd place, silver medalist(s)	320
3rd place, bronze medalist(s)	Chitchanok Pulsabsakul (THA)	A	125.22	126	127	132	3rd place, bronze medalist(s)	158	162	~~165~~	4	294
4	Praeonapa Khenjantuek (THA)	A	133.20	120	122	~~128~~	4	156	159	163	3rd place, bronze medalist(s)	285
5	Yulia Konovalova (RUS)	A	88.28	115	~~120~~	120	5	145	150	155	5	275
6	Shaimaa Khalaf (EGY)	A	119.27	112	116	~~121~~	6	145	~~150~~	~~155~~	8	261
7	Son Young-hee (KOR)	A	106.89	105	~~112~~	112	8	141	147	~~150~~	6	259
8	Anastasiya Lysenko (UKR)	A	100.62	~~111~~	~~111~~	111	9	130	136	142	9	253
9	Mami Shimamoto (JPN)	A	102.82	105	~~110~~	110	12	133	138	140	11	250
10	Naryury Pérez (VEN)	A	98.27	103	~~110~~	~~110~~	17	135	140	145	7	248
11	Halima Abdelazim (EGY)	B	114.89	106	111	~~114~~	10	131	136	—	12	247
12	Tania Mascorro (MEX)	B	105.39	109	~~113~~	114	7	127	132	~~136~~	16	246
13	Holley Mangold (USA)	B	155.42	100	105	~~110~~	15	130	136	141	10	246
14	Oliba Nieve (ECU)	B	90.03	105	110	~~114~~	11	130	135	~~137~~	13	245
15	Andreea Aanei (ROU)	A	105.01	108	~~113~~	~~113~~	13	~~132~~	132	~~139~~	15	240
16	Deborah Acason (AUS)	B	91.78	103	~~107~~	~~107~~	16	122	127	129	17	232
17	Sabina Bagińska (POL)	B	104.50	97	100	~~102~~	20	128	132	~~134~~	14	232
18	Riska Anjani Yasin (INA)	C	104.71	99	103	~~106~~	18	121	125	129	18	232
19	Marissa Klingseis (USA)	C	99.40	98	102	~~105~~	19	122	126	~~130~~	19	228
20	Kaity Fassina (AUS)	C	95.25	98	102	105	14	118	122	~~125~~	21	227
21	Magdalena Pasko (POL)	B	90.77	95	~~100~~	~~100~~	21	~~125~~	125	~~128~~	20	220
22	Shalinee Valaydon (MRI)	C	113.16	90	95	~~100~~	22	110	~~115~~	115	22	210
23	Madeleine Yamechi (FRA)	C	83.84	88	90	~~94~~	23	110	113	~~115~~	23	203
24	Roberta Buttiglieri (ITA)	C	98.17	90	~~94~~	~~94~~	24	110	~~113~~	~~113~~	24	200
—	Tabea Tabel (GER)	C	75.38	~~87~~	~~87~~	~~87~~	—	—	—	—	—	—
DQ	Hripsime Khurshudyan (ARM)	A	87.00	100	102	107	—	130	136	~~139~~	—	—

== New records ==
Snatch	152 kg	Tatiana Kashirina (RUS)	WR
Snatch	155 kg	Tatiana Kashirina (RUS)	WR
Clean & Jerk	193 kg	Tatiana Kashirina (RUS)	WR
Total	340 kg	Tatiana Kashirina (RUS)	WR
Total	348 kg	Tatiana Kashirina (RUS)	WR
