= Nurul Akmal =

Indonesian weightlifter (born 1993)

Personal information
- Nickname: Amel
- Born: 12 February 1993 (age 33) North Aceh, Indonesia
- Education: University of Abulyatama

Sport
- Country: Indonesia
- Sport: Weightlifting
- Weight class: +87 kg
- Club: Seuramoe Lifter Aceh
- Coached by: Dirdja Wihardja
Medal record
Women's weightlifting
Representing Indonesia
Asian Championships
Silver medal – second place	2022 Manama	+87 kg
Bronze medal – third place	2024 Tashkent	+87 kg
Islamic Solidarity Games
Silver medal – second place	2017 Baku	+90 kg
Bronze medal – third place	2021 Konya	+87 kg S
Bronze medal – third place	2021 Konya	+87 kg C&J
Bronze medal – third place	2021 Konya	+87 kg T
SEA Games
Silver medal – second place	2021 Vietnam	+71 kg
Silver medal – second place	2023 Cambodia	+71 kg
Qatar Cup
Bronze medal – third place	2019 Doha	+87 kg

Nurul Akmal (born 12 February 1993) is an Indonesian weightlifter of Acehnese descent. She won the silver medal in the women's +90 kg event at the 2017 Islamic Solidarity Games held in Baku, Azerbaijan. She also represented Indonesia at the 2020 Summer Olympics in Tokyo, Japan, as well as the 2024 Summer Olympics in Paris, France.

== Career ==
In 2017, she finished in 6th place in the women's +90 kg event at the Summer Universiade held in Taipei, Taiwan. The following year, she represented Indonesia at the 2018 Asian Games held in Jakarta, Indonesia in the women's +75 kg event where she finished in 6th place. She also competed in the women's +87 kg event at the 2018 World Weightlifting Championships held in Ashgabat, Turkmenistan.

In 2019, she competed in the women's +87 kg at the World Weightlifting Championships held in Pattaya, Thailand. In that same year, she won the bronze medal in the women's +87 kg event at the 6th International Qatar Cup held in Doha, Qatar. In April 2021, she competed at the 2020 Asian Weightlifting Championships held in Tashkent, Uzbekistan.

She represented Indonesia at the 2020 Summer Olympics in Tokyo, Japan. She finished in 5th place in the women's +87 kg event. She was also one of the flagbearers for Indonesia during the 2020 Summer Olympics Parade of Nations as part of the opening ceremony on 23 July 2021.

She won the bronze medal in the women's +87 kg event at the 2021 Islamic Solidarity Games held in Konya, Turkey. She won the silver medal in her event at the 2022 Asian Weightlifting Championships held in Manama, Bahrain.

In August 2024, she finished in 12th place in the women's +81 kg event at the Summer Olympics held in Paris, France.

== Awards and nominations ==
Award	Year	Category	Result	Ref.
Line Today Choice	2021	Most Favorite Indonesian Athlete	Nominated	

== Achievements ==
Year	Venue	Weight	Snatch (kg)				Clean & Jerk (kg)				Total	Rank
Year	Venue	Weight	1	2	3	Rank	1	2	3	Rank	Total	Rank
Summer Olympics
2021	Tokyo, Japan	+87 kg	107	111	115	—N/a	141	~~151~~	~~154~~	—N/a	256	5
2024	Paris, France	+81 kg	105	~~110~~	~~110~~	—N/a	140	~~145~~	~~151~~	—N/a	245	12
World Championships
2018	Ashgabat, Turkmenistan	+87 kg	105	~~110~~	~~110~~	16	138	143	146	9	251	12
2019	Pattaya, Thailand	+87 kg	110	~~114~~	~~114~~	14	~~145~~	145	150	10	260	11
2021	Tashkent, Uzbekistan	+87 kg	107	~~112~~	112	7	145	~~151~~	~~151~~	6	257	6
2022	Bogotá, Colombia	+87 kg	105	110	115	10	~~145~~	145	~~150~~	10	260	9
2023	Riyadh, Saudi Arabia	+87 kg	~~105~~	105	110	10	~~145~~	146	~~150~~	7	256	8
IWF World Cup
2024	Phuket, Thailand	+87 kg	107	~~115~~	~~115~~	12	~~145~~	~~147~~	~~150~~	—	—	—
Asian Games
2018	Jakarta, Indonesia	+75 kg	108	112	116	—N/a	137	~~147~~	~~147~~	—N/a	253	6
2023	Hangzhou, China	+87 kg	105	110	115	—N/a	~~145~~	145	146	—N/a	261	4
Asian Championships
2019	Ningbo, China	+87 kg	~~107~~	~~107~~	107	7	~~143~~	~~143~~	143	6	250	6
2021	Tashkent, Uzbekistan	+87 kg	106	~~111~~	111	5	~~140~~	140	~~147~~	5	251	5
2022	Manama, Bahrain	+87 kg	105	110	114	3rd place, bronze medalist(s)	142	148	153	2nd place, silver medalist(s)	267	2nd place, silver medalist(s)
2024	Tashkent, Uzbekistan	+87 kg	105	110	~~113~~	4	140	143	149	3rd place, bronze medalist(s)	259	3rd place, bronze medalist(s)
Islamic Solidarity Games
2017	Baku, Azerbaijan	+90 kg	95	99	~~102~~	—N/a	123	127	131	—N/a	230	2nd place, silver medalist(s)
2021	Konya, Turkey	+87 kg	105	110	113	3rd place, bronze medalist(s)	142	~~148~~	~~148~~	3rd place, bronze medalist(s)	255	3rd place, bronze medalist(s)
