= Kuinini Manumua =

Tongan-American weightlifter (born 2000)

Personal information
- Nickname: Nini Manumua
- Nationality: Tongan; American
- Born: Kuinini Juanita Mechteld Manumua; December 12, 2000 (age 25) American Samoa
- Years active: 2017–present

Sport
- Country: Tonga; United States
- Sport: Weightlifting
Medal record
Women's weightlifting
Representing Tonga
Oceania Championships
Bronze medal – third place	2021	+87 kg
Representing United States
Youth World Championships
Bronze medal – third place	2017 Bangkok	+75 kg

Kuinini Juanita Mechteld Manumua (born 12 December 2000) is a Tongan-American weightlifter. She competed at the 2020 Summer Olympics in the Women's +87 kg category, the first athlete representing Tonga to do so. She placed in eighth.

== Career ==
Kuinini Manumua was born on 12 December 2000 in American Samoa. She was raised as a child in her parents' home country of Tonga, living in the village of Ha’alaufuli in Vava'u, but her family moved to San Francisco when Manumua was 10. As a high school freshman, Manumua began weightlifting as an extracurricular activity. At the age of 17, Manumua qualified for the American youth world weightlifting team, and won bronze at the 2017 Youth World Weightlifting Championships in the women's +75 kg category, representing the United States of America.

Manumua competed at the 2018 Junior World Weightlifting Championships, representing the United States of America in the women's +90 kg category. She lifted 101 kg in snatch and 130 kg in clean & jerk, coming in fifth place. Manumua's first participation representing Tonga was at the 2018 World Weightlifting Championships, where she competed in the women's +87 kg category. Manumua placed 21st, lifting 98 kg in snatch and 129 kg in clean & jerk.

Speaking to Matangi Tonga, Manumua explained that part of her reasoning for switching teams from the US to Tonga was that "I wanted to represent my little country so it can, hopefully, be the beginning of something for other Tongan girls like me, to feel inspired to do weightlifting. Or just lifting in general. In addition, I also wanted Tonga to have more recognition in sports, and I feel a lot of pride in representing Tonga."

In 2019, Manumua competed for Tonga in the Oceania Weightlifting Championships in the women's +87 kg category. She placed fifth place in snatch, lifting 80 kg. Manumua also took part in the 2019 World Weightlifting Championships, representing Tonga in the Women's +87 kg group. She lifted 96 kg in snatch and 115 kg in clean & jerk, placing 19th.

In qualifications for the 2020 Summer Olympics in the women's +87 kg category, Manumua placed in 14th, initially failing to qualify. There was controversy surrounding Manumua's exclusion, due to the fact that one of the athletes in the Oceania bracket who did qualify was Laurel Hubbard, who is a transgender female. The San Francisco Chronicle wrote that "Manumua’s name started showing up as a cause celebre in right wing media".

Hubbard, alongside one other Oceania athlete, Iuniarra Sipaia of Samoa, all qualified in the top 8, automatically giving them both a spot at the Games. Outside of the top 8 athletes, each continent then had their next highest-placed athlete qualify. The Oceania slot would have been granted to ninth placed Charisma Amoe-Tarrant from Australia, however Samoa withdrew their weightlifters from the Olympic Games due to COVID-19 restrictions, placing Amoe-Tarrant in the top 8. By this time, Manumua had been granted a Tripartite Commission invitation to represent Tonga. This meant she could not take the spare slot of Oceania. Oceania's spare slot ended up being given to Guatemalan athlete Scarleth Ucelo. Hubbard ultimately failed to finish the event after being unable to complete a clean snatch in her 3 attempts. Manumua said of Hubbard's performance that "I feel bad for her that she bombed out. Bombing out at the Olympics has got to be a horrible feeling."

Manumua's qualification made her the first woman to represent Tonga in weightlifting at the Olympic Games. At the 2020 Olympic Games, she placed eighth, lifting 103 kg in snatch and 125 kg in clean & jerk. Her eighth-placed result was the highest ranking out of the six Tongans who attended the 2020 Olympic Games. Manumua told the San Francisco Chronicle shortly after her Olympic performance that she did "want to go to another [Olympic Game]", and that she wanted "to see how much better I can get in three years".

== Major results ==
Year	Venue	Weight	Snatch (kg)				Clean & Jerk (kg)				Total	Rank
Year	Venue	Weight	1	2	3	Rank	1	2	3	Rank	Total	Rank
Representing Tonga
Olympic Games
2021	Tokyo, Japan	+87 kg	100	103	~~106~~	8	~~125~~	125	~~128~~	9	228	8
World Championships
2019	Pattaya, Thailand	+87 kg	90	93	96	19	105	110	115	19	211	19
2018	Ashgabat, Turkmenistan	+87 kg	~~98~~	~~98~~	98	23	125	129	~~132~~	22	227	23
Oceania Weightlifting
2019	Apia, Samoa	+87 kg	94	98	~~101~~	5	~~111~~	~~111~~	~~111~~	—	—	DNF
Representing United States
Junior World Weightlifting Championships
2018	Tashkent, Uzbekistan	+90 kg	~~98~~	98	101	5	125	130	~~134~~	5	231	5
Youth World Weightlifting Championships
2017	Bangkok, Thailand	+75 kg	88	91	93	3rd place, bronze medalist(s)	109	~~116~~	117	3rd place, bronze medalist(s)	210	3rd place, bronze medalist(s)

== Personal life ==
Manumua is a member of the Church of Jesus Christ of Latter-day Saints.
