= Weightlifting at the 2020 Summer Olympics – Women's +87 kg =

Women's +87 kg at the Games of the XXXII Olympiad
- Venue: Tokyo International Forum
- Date: 2 August 2021
- Competitors: 14 from 14 nations
- Winning total: 320 kg OR

Medalists
1st place, gold medalist(s)		Li Wenwen	China
2nd place, silver medalist(s)		Emily Campbell	Great Britain
3rd place, bronze medalist(s)		Sarah Robles	United States

The women's +87 kg weightlifting competitions at the 2020 Summer Olympics in Tokyo took place on 2 August 2021 at the Tokyo International Forum. During the competition, Laurel Hubbard made history by becoming the first transgender woman athlete to compete in the Olympics.

Li Wenwen from China won the gold, making three new Olympic records in the process, for snatch, clean & jerk as well as for the combined weight lifted.

The bouquets were presented by IWF Interim President Dr. Michael Irani (Great Britain), and medals were presented by IOC Member Juan Antonio Samaranch Salisachs (Spain).

== Records ==
Prior to this competition, the existing world and Olympic records were as follows.

World Record	Snatch	Li Wenwen (CHN)	148 kg	Tashkent, Uzbekistan	25 April 2021
World Record	Clean & Jerk	Li Wenwen (CHN)	187 kg	Tashkent, Uzbekistan	25 April 2021
World Record	Total	Li Wenwen (CHN)	335 kg	Tashkent, Uzbekistan	25 April 2021
Olympic Record	Snatch	Olympic Standard	139 kg	—	1 November 2018
Olympic Record	Clean & Jerk	Olympic Standard	172 kg	—	1 November 2018
Olympic Record	Total	Olympic Standard	306 kg	—	1 November 2018

== Results ==
Rank	Athlete	Nation	Group	Body weight	Snatch (kg)				Clean & Jerk (kg)				Total
Rank	Athlete	Nation	Group	Body weight	1	2	3	Result	1	2	3	Result	Total
1st place, gold medalist(s)	Li Wenwen	China	A	150.10	130	135	140	140 OR	162	173	180	180 OR	320 OR
2nd place, silver medalist(s)	Emily Campbell	Great Britain	A	124.80	118	~~122~~	122	122	150	156	161	161	283
3rd place, bronze medalist(s)	Sarah Robles	United States	A	148.30	120	125	128	128	150	154	~~157~~	154	282
4	Lee Seon-mi	South Korea	A	118.90	118	122	125	125	148	152	~~155~~	152	277
5	Nurul Akmal	Indonesia	A	113.55	107	111	115	115	141	~~151~~	~~154~~	141	256
6	Charisma Amoe-Tarrant	Australia	A	154.05	95	100	105	105	123	128	138	138	243
7	Verónica Saladín	Dominican Republic	A	126.20	105	111	~~116~~	111	125	131	–	131	242
8	Kuinini Manumua	Tonga	A	108.50	100	103	~~106~~	103	~~125~~	125	~~128~~	125	228
9	Eyurkenia Duverger	Cuba	B	103.65	96	~~100~~	~~100~~	96	120	124	129	129	225
10	Sarah Fischer	Austria	A	93.35	93	~~97~~	97	97	117	~~123~~	123	123	220
11	Anna Van Bellinghen	Belgium	B	87.10	96	~~100~~	~~100~~	96	115	119	123	123	219
12	Erdenebatyn Bilegsaikhan	Mongolia	B		80	85	~~87~~	85	115	120	122	122	207
13	Scarleth Ucelo	Guatemala	B	113.50	~~86~~	~~87~~	87	87	107	112	116	116	203
–	Laurel Hubbard	New Zealand	A	146.70	~~120~~	~~125~~	~~125~~	–	–	–	–	–	DNF

== New records ==
Snatch	140 kg	Li Wenwen (CHN)	OR
Clean & Jerk	173 kg	Li Wenwen (CHN)	OR
Clean & Jerk	180 kg	Li Wenwen (CHN)	OR
Total	313 kg	Li Wenwen (CHN)	OR
Total	320 kg	Li Wenwen (CHN)	OR
