= Weightlifting at the 2022 Asian Games – Women's +87 kg =

Women's +87 kg at the 2022 Asian Games
- Venue: Xiaoshan Sports Center Gymnasium
- Date: 7 October 2023
- Competitors: 6 from 5 nations

Medalists
gold medal	Park Hye-jeong	South Korea
silver medal	Son Young-hee	South Korea
bronze medal	Duangaksorn Chaidee	Thailand

The women's +87 kilograms competition at the 2022 Asian Games took place on 7 October 2023 at Xiaoshan Sports Center Gymnasium.

== Schedule ==
All times are China Standard Time (UTC+08:00)

Date	Time	Event
Saturday, 7 October 2023	15:00	Group A

== Records ==
Prior to this competition, the existing world, Asian and Games records were as follows.

World Record	Snatch	Li Wenwen (CHN)	148 kg	Tashkent, Uzbekistan	25 April 2021
World Record	Clean & Jerk	Li Wenwen (CHN)	187 kg	Tashkent, Uzbekistan	25 April 2021
World Record	Total	Li Wenwen (CHN)	335 kg	Tashkent, Uzbekistan	25 April 2021
Asian Record	Snatch	Li Wenwen (CHN)	148 kg	Tashkent, Uzbekistan	25 April 2021
Asian Record	Clean & Jerk	Li Wenwen (CHN)	187 kg	Tashkent, Uzbekistan	25 April 2021
Asian Record	Total	Li Wenwen (CHN)	335 kg	Tashkent, Uzbekistan	25 April 2021
Games Record	Snatch	Asian Games Standard	132 kg	—	1 November 2018
Games Record	Clean & Jerk	Asian Games Standard	177 kg	—	1 November 2018
Games Record	Total	Asian Games Standard	307 kg	—	1 November 2018

== Results ==
Rank	Athlete	Group	Snatch (kg)				Clean & Jerk (kg)				Total
Rank	Athlete	Group	1	2	3	Result	1	2	3	Result	Total
1st place, gold medalist(s)	Park Hye-jeong (KOR)	A	118	123	125	125	157	160	169	169	294
2nd place, silver medalist(s)	Son Young-hee (KOR)	A	115	120	124	124	155	159	~~169~~	159	283
3rd place, bronze medalist(s)	Duangaksorn Chaidee (THA)	A	115	118	120	120	147	155	~~158~~	155	275
4	Nurul Akmal (INA)	A	105	110	115	115	~~145~~	145	146	146	261
5	Tursunoy Jabborova (UZB)	A	110	115	118	118	135	142	~~145~~	142	260
6	Aisamal Sansyzbayeva (KAZ)	A	105	110	~~113~~	110	130	135	138	138	248
