= Mary Theisen-Lappen =

American weightlifter (born 1990)

Personal information
- Full name: Mary Anne Theisen-Lappen
- Nickname: Coach Mary
- Born: November 3, 1990 (age 35)
- Home town: Eau Claire, Wisconsin, U.S.
- Education: Indiana State University (2014); University of Missouri (2019)

Sport
- Country: United States
- Sport: Weightlifting
- Weight class: +87 kg
- Coached by: Wil Fleming
Medal record
Women's weightlifting
Representing United States
World Championships
Silver medal – second place	2023 Riyadh	+87 kg
Bronze medal – third place	2025 Førde	+86 kg
Pan American Games
Gold medal – first place	2023 Santiago	+81 kg
Pan American Championships
Gold medal – first place	2021 Guayaquil	+87 kg
Gold medal – first place	2023 Bariloche	+87 kg
Silver medal – second place	2025 Cali	+86 kg
Bronze medal – third place	2026 Panama City	+86 kg

Mary Anne Theisen-Lappen (born November 3, 1990) is an American weightlifter.

She won the silver medal in the women's +87 kg event at the 2023 World Weightlifting Championships held in Riyadh, Saudi Arabia, and the gold medal in the women's +81 kg event at the 2023 Pan American Games held in Santiago, Chile.

== Career ==
In 2021, she won the gold medal in the women's +87 kg event at the Pan American Weightlifting Championships held in Guayaquil, Ecuador. She also won the gold medal in her event at the 2023 Pan American Weightlifting Championships held in Bariloche, Argentina.

In September 2023, Theisen-Lappen won the silver medal in the women's +87 kg event at the World Weightlifting Championships held in Riyadh, Saudi Arabia.

In October 2023, she won the gold medal in the women's +81 kg event at the Pan American Games held in Santiago, Chile. She made six successful lifts with her best lifts being 120 kg in the Snatch and 157 kg in the Clean & Jerk.

In December 2023, Theisen-Lappen won the gold medal in the women's +87 kg at the 2023 IWF Grand Prix II in Doha, Qatar, with a total of 283kg.

In August 2024, she finished in 5th place in the women's +81 kg event at the 2024 Summer Olympics held in Paris, France.

== Personal life ==
She is married to bowler Casey Lappen.

== Achievements ==
Year	Venue	Weight	Snatch (kg)				Clean & Jerk (kg)				Total	Rank
Year	Venue	Weight	1	2	3	Rank	1	2	3	Rank	Total	Rank
Summer Olympics
2024	Paris, France	+81 kg	115	~~118~~	119	—N/a	155	~~162~~	~~165~~	—N/a	274	5
World Championships
2023	Riyadh, Saudi Arabia	+87 kg	~~117~~	117	~~121~~	6	156	160	~~166~~	2nd place, silver medalist(s)	277	2nd place, silver medalist(s)
2025	Førde, Norway	+86 kg	115	~~118~~	~~119~~	5	~~154~~	154	~~159~~	3rd place, bronze medalist(s)	269	3rd place, bronze medalist(s)
IWF World Cup
2024	Phuket, Thailand	+87 kg	~~118~~	118	~~122~~	8	151	156	~~162~~	5	274	5
Pan American Games
2023	Santiago, Chile	+81 kg	112	116	120	—N/a	150	155	157	—N/a	277	1st place, gold medalist(s)
Pan American Championships
2021	Guayaquil, Ecuador	+87 kg	109	114	117	1st place, gold medalist(s)	140	148	153	1st place, gold medalist(s)	270	1st place, gold medalist(s)
2023	Bariloche, Argentina	+87 kg	110	~~114~~	114	2nd place, silver medalist(s)	145	152	158	1st place, gold medalist(s)	272	1st place, gold medalist(s)
2025	Cali, Colombia	+87 kg	114	117	~~119~~	3rd place, bronze medalist(s)	153	156	161	2nd place, silver medalist(s)	278	2nd place, silver medalist(s)
