= Emily Campbell =

British weightlifter (born 1994)

Personal information
- Full name: Emily Jade Campbell
- Nationality: British
- Born: 6 May 1994 (age 32) Nottingham, England
- Home town: Nottingham, England
- Education: Leeds Beckett University
- Height: 1.765 m (5 ft 9 in)
- Weight: 112 kg (247 lb)

Sport
- Sport: Weightlifting
- Club: Atlas Weightlifting Club
- Coached by: Cyril Martin
Medal record
Women's weightlifting
Representing Great Britain
Olympic Games
Silver medal – second place	2020 Tokyo	+87 kg
Bronze medal – third place	2024 Paris	+81 kg
World Championships
Silver medal – second place	2022 Bogota	+87 kg
Bronze medal – third place	2021 Tashkent	+87 kg
European Championships
Gold medal – first place	2021 Moscow	+87 kg
Gold medal – first place	2022 Tirana	+87 kg
Gold medal – first place	2023 Yerevan	+87 kg
Gold medal – first place	2024 Sofia	+87 kg
Gold medal – first place	2025 Chișinău	+87 kg
Gold medal – first place	2026 Batumi	+86 kg
Bronze medal – third place	2019 Batumi	+87 kg
European U23 Championships
Silver medal – second place	2017 Durrës	+87 kg
Representing England
Commonwealth Games
Gold medal – first place	2026 Glasgow	+86 kg
Gold medal – first place	2022 Birmingham	+87 kg
Bronze medal – third place	2018 Gold Coast	+90 kg

Emily Jade Campbell (born 6 May 1994) is a British weightlifter. Widely regarded as the most successful British female weightlifter of modern times, she is a double Commonwealth Games and six-time European champion, and a double World and Olympic medalist.

In 2021, competing in the +87 kg category, Campbell became both European champion, and the first British woman to win an Olympic medal in the sport, with silver at the 2020 Summer Olympics in Tokyo. In 2022 she retained her European title, won the gold medal at her home Commonwealth Games in a new Commonwealth Games record, and upgraded her 2021 World Championships bronze medal to a silver in Bogota.

In 2023, Campbell confirmed a hat-trick of three successive European titles, before in 2024 recreating her 2021 success, winning her fourth consecutive European title and her second Olympic medal, a bronze in the +81 kg category at the 2024 Summer Olympics in Paris. In 2025 a fifth consecutive European title came, with a sixth following in 2026. Later in 2026 she retained her Commonwealth Games title.

== Biography ==
Campbell is from the Snape Wood estate in Bulwell, Nottinghamshire. She graduated from Leeds Beckett University with a Sports Science degree in 2016.

Campbell competed in the women's +90 kg event at the 2018 Commonwealth Games, winning the bronze medal. In the following year she came third in the 2019 European Championships gaining another bronze medal. In early 2021 she became the European champion after winning in Moscow in the +87 kg category.

At the 2020 Summer Olympics in Tokyo (held in 2021 due to the COVID-19 pandemic), Campbell became the first British female weightlifter to win a medal at the Olympics, with a silver in the women's +87 kg event. Later that year, she went on to earn a bronze medal at the World Championships in Tashkent, Uzbekistan.

She won the gold medal in her event at the 2022 European Weightlifting Championships held in Tirana, Albania and retained her title, with a somewhat reduced lift, in 2023 in Yerevan, Armenia.

The British Olympic Association chose Campbell as Team GB's only weightlifter at the 2024 Paris Olympics in the +81 kg category. At the Games she won a bronze medal setting a new combined personal best of 288 kg in the process.

Back at the +87 kg category, Campbell won her fifth consecutive European title in Chișinău, Moldova, in April 2025 with a combined total of 281 kg. She is the first British lifter to achieve this feat.

In July 2025, Campbell was awarded an honorary doctorate by her former university, Leeds Beckett for her service to sport and advocacy for inclusion.

In 2026, Campbell appeared on Celebrity MasterChef, reaching the final.

== Personal life ==
Born in England, Campbell is of English and Jamaican descent. Her sister Kelsie Campbell is an international swimmer for Jamaica.

== Achievements ==
Year	Venue	Weight	Snatch (kg)				Clean & Jerk (kg)				Total	Rank
Year	Venue	Weight	1	2	3	Rank	1	2	3	Rank	Total	Rank
Olympic Games representing Great Britain
2020	Tokyo, Japan	+87 kg	118	~~122~~	122	—N/a	150	156	161	—N/a	283	2nd place, silver medalist(s)
2024	Paris, France	+81 kg	119	123	126	—N/a	162	~~169~~	~~174~~	—N/a	288	3rd place, bronze medalist(s)
World Championships representing Great Britain
2018	Ashgabat, Turkmenistan	+87 kg	104	108	~~111~~	12	136	140	~~143~~	13	248	14
2019	Pattaya, Thailand	+87 kg	114	~~118~~	~~118~~	13	145	149	153	9	267	9
2021	Tashkent, Uzbekistan	+87 kg	115	118	121	3rd place, bronze medalist(s)	~~155~~	157	~~162~~	2nd place, silver medalist(s)	278	3rd place, bronze medalist(s)
2022	Bogotá, Colombia	+87 kg	119	122	~~125~~	5	~~157~~	161	165	2nd place, silver medalist(s)	287	2nd place, silver medalist(s)
2023	Riyadh, Saudi Arabia	+87 kg	did not enter									
2024	Manama, Bahrain	+87 kg	118	~~120~~	—	4	—	—	—	—	NM	—
2025	Førde, Norway	+86 kg	115	~~118~~	~~119~~	4	153	~~158~~	~~159~~	4	268	4
European Championships, representing Great Britain
2019	Batumi, Georgia	+87 kg	108	~~112~~	115	3rd place, bronze medalist(s)	140	145	~~150~~	3rd place, bronze medalist(s)	260	3rd place, bronze medalist(s)
2021	Moscow, Russia	+87 kg	115	117	122	1st place, gold medalist(s)	145	150	154	1st place, gold medalist(s)	276	1st place, gold medalist(s)
2022	Tirana, Albania	+87 kg	110	114	118	1st place, gold medalist(s)	142	148	153	1st place, gold medalist(s)	271	1st place, gold medalist(s)
2023	Yerevan, Armenia	+87 kg	~~110~~	~~110~~	110	4	136	143	—	1st place, gold medalist(s)	253	1st place, gold medalist(s)
2024	Sofia, Bulgaria	+87 kg	112	~~116~~	~~116~~	2nd place, silver medalist(s)	146	151	—	1st place, gold medalist(s)	263	1st place, gold medalist(s)
2025	Chișinău, Moldova	+87 kg	112	116	120	1st place, gold medalist(s)	150	156	161	1st place, gold medalist(s)	281	1st place, gold medalist(s)
2026	Batumi, Georgia	+86 kg	~~114~~	114	117	3rd place, bronze medalist(s)	151	155	159	1st place, gold medalist(s)	276	1st place, gold medalist(s)
Commonwealth Games, representing England
2018	Gold Coast, Australia	+90 kg	~~99~~	99	103	—	~~129~~	129	139	—	242	3rd place, bronze medalist(s)
2022	Birmingham, England	+87 kg	117	121	124 GR	—	152	157	162 GR	—	286 GR	1st place, gold medalist(s)
2026	Glasgow, Scotland	+86 kg	110	~~114~~	115	—	148	155	163 CR GR	—	278 GR	1st place, gold medalist(s)
