= Duangaksorn Chaidee =

Thai weightlifter (born 1997)

Personal information
- Nickname: Nong Som
- Nationality: Thai
- Born: 11 August 1997 (age 28) Nong Bua Lamphu, Thailand
- Height: 1.73 m (5 ft 8 in)
- Weight: 113.70 kg (251 lb)

Sport
- Country: Thailand
- Sport: Weightlifting
- Weight class: +87 kg
- Club: Nakhon Sawan
- Coached by: Sakchai Thitajaree
Medal record
World Championships
Silver medal – second place	2021 Tashkent	+87 kg
Bronze medal – third place	2022 Bogotá	+87 kg
Asian Games
Bronze medal – third place	2018 Jakarta-Palembang	+75 kg
Bronze medal – third place	2022 Hangzhou	+87 kg
SEA Games
Gold medal – first place	2021 Vietnam	+71 kg
Gold medal – first place	2023 Cambodia	+71 kg
Youth Olympic Games
Gold medal – first place	2014 Nanjing	+63 kg

Duangaksorn Chaidee (Thai: ดวงอักษร ใจดี; born 11 August 1997) is a Thai weightlifter, who competed in the +63 kg category and represented Thailand at international competitions.

== Career ==
As a junior, she won the gold medal at the 2014 Summer Youth Olympics.

In 2018, she was banned until 2020 by the International Weightlifting Federation after testing positive for 5a- androstane-3a, 17 bdiol (5aAdiol) and 5b-androstane-3a, 17 b-diol (5bAdiol).

She won the silver medal in the women's +87 kg event at the 2021 World Weightlifting Championships held in Tashkent, Uzbekistan.

In August 2024, she finished in 6th place in the women's +81 kg event at the 2024 Summer Olympics held in Paris, France.

== Major results ==
Year	Venue	Weight	Snatch (kg)				Clean & Jerk (kg)				Total	Rank
Year	Venue	Weight	1	2	3	Rank	1	2	3	Rank	Total	Rank
Summer Olympics
2024	Paris, France	+81 kg	~~120~~	~~120~~	120	—N/a	152	~~156~~	~~160~~	—N/a	272	6
World Championships
2017	Anaheim, United States	+90 kg	~~116~~	~~116~~	~~117~~	—	—	—	—	—	—	—
2018	Ashgabat, Turkmenistan	+87 kg	120	125	129	—	162	167	~~170~~	—	DSQ	—
2021	Tashkent, Uzbekistan	+87 kg	119	122	124	1st place, gold medalist(s)	153	~~156~~	157	3rd place, bronze medalist(s)	281	2nd place, silver medalist(s)
2022	Bogotá, Colombia	+87 kg	120	124	126	3rd place, bronze medalist(s)	155	158	160	3rd place, bronze medalist(s)	286	3rd place, bronze medalist(s)
IWF World Cup
2024	Phuket, Thailand	+87 kg	115	119	122	4	150	155	158	4	280	4
Asian Games
2018	Jakarta, Indonesia	+75 kg	114	118	121	—N/a	154	157	159	—N/a	280	3rd place, bronze medalist(s)
2023	Hangzhou, China	+87 kg	115	118	120	—N/a	147	155	~~158~~	—N/a	275	3rd place, bronze medalist(s)
Asian Championships
2023	Jinju, South Korea	+87 kg	~~132~~	—	—	—	—	—	—	—	—	—
Summer Youth Olympics
2014	Nanjing, China	+63 kg	98	102	106	—N/a	130	135	138	—N/a	244	1st place, gold medalist(s)
