= Shaimaa Khalaf =

Egyptian weightlifter (born 1991)

Shaimaa Haridy
Personal information
- Full name: Shaimaa Ahmed Khalaf Haridy
- Nationality: Egyptian
- Born: 1 January 1991 (age 35)
- Weight: 120.85 kg (266 lb)

Sport
- Country: Egypt
- Sport: Weightlifting
- Event: +75 kg
Medal record
Women's weightlifting
Representing Egypt
World Championships
Bronze medal – third place	2017 Anaheim	+90 kg
Islamic Solidarity Games
Gold medal – first place	2017 Baku	+90 kg
African Games
Gold medal – first place	2015 Brazzaville	+75 kg
African Championships
Silver medal – second place	2022 Cairo	+87 kg

Shaimaa Haridy (Egyptian Arabic: شيماء هريدى, born 1 January 1991) is an Egyptian weightlifter, competing in the +75 kg category and representing Egypt at international competitions. She competed at world championships, including at the 2015 World Weightlifting Championships. At the 2016 Summer Olympics she competed in the Women's +75 kg.

In 2017, she won the gold medal in the women's +90 kg event at the Islamic Solidarity Games held in Baku, Azerbaijan.

== Major results ==
Year	Venue	Weight	Snatch (kg)				Clean & Jerk (kg)				Total	Rank
Year	Venue	Weight	1	2	3	Rank	1	2	3	Rank	Total	Rank
World Championships
2017	Anaheim, United States	+90 kg	115	~~120~~	~~120~~	4	150	153	~~157~~	2nd place, silver medalist(s)	268	3rd place, bronze medalist(s)
2015	Houston, United States	+75 kg	115	~~120~~	~~120~~	17	150	~~155~~	~~156~~	9	265	10
2014	Almaty, Kazakhstan	+75 kg	112	116	~~121~~	6	145	~~150~~	~~155~~	8	261	6
2011	Paris, France	+75 kg	100	105	---	13	130	135	140	10	245	12
2010	Antalya, Turkey	+75 kg	97	101	~~105~~	16	128	134	138	14	239	14
