= Scarleth Ucelo =

Guatemalan weightlifter (born 2000)

Personal information
- Full name: Scarleth Vanessa Ucelo Marroquín
- Born: 7 April 2000 (age 26) Jalapa, Guatemala

Sport
- Country: Guatemala
- Sport: Weightlifting
- Weight class: +87 kg

Scarleth Vanessa Ucelo Marroquín (born 7 April 2000) is a Guatemalan weightlifter. She represented Guatemala at the 2020 Summer Olympics in Tokyo, Japan. She finished in 13th place in the women's +87 kg event.

In 2019, she finished in 5th place in the women's +87 kg event at the Pan American Games held in Lima, Peru.

Ucelo competed in the women's +87 kg event at the 2021 World Weightlifting Championships held in Tashkent, Uzbekistan.

== Achievements ==
Year	Venue	Weight	Snatch (kg)				Clean & Jerk (kg)				Total	Rank
Year	Venue	Weight	1	2	3	Rank	1	2	3	Rank	Total	Rank
Summer Olympics
2021	Tokyo, Japan	+87 kg	~~86~~	~~87~~	87	—N/a	107	112	116	—N/a	203	13
World Championships
2021	Tashkent, Uzbekistan	+87 kg	82	~~88~~	~~88~~	13	~~120~~	120	~~125~~	12	202	12
Pan American Games
2019	Lima, Peru	+87 kg	73	76	~~79~~	—N/a	105	110	~~114~~	—N/a	186	5
