= Kim Kuk-hyang (weightlifter) =

North Korean weightlifter (born 1993)

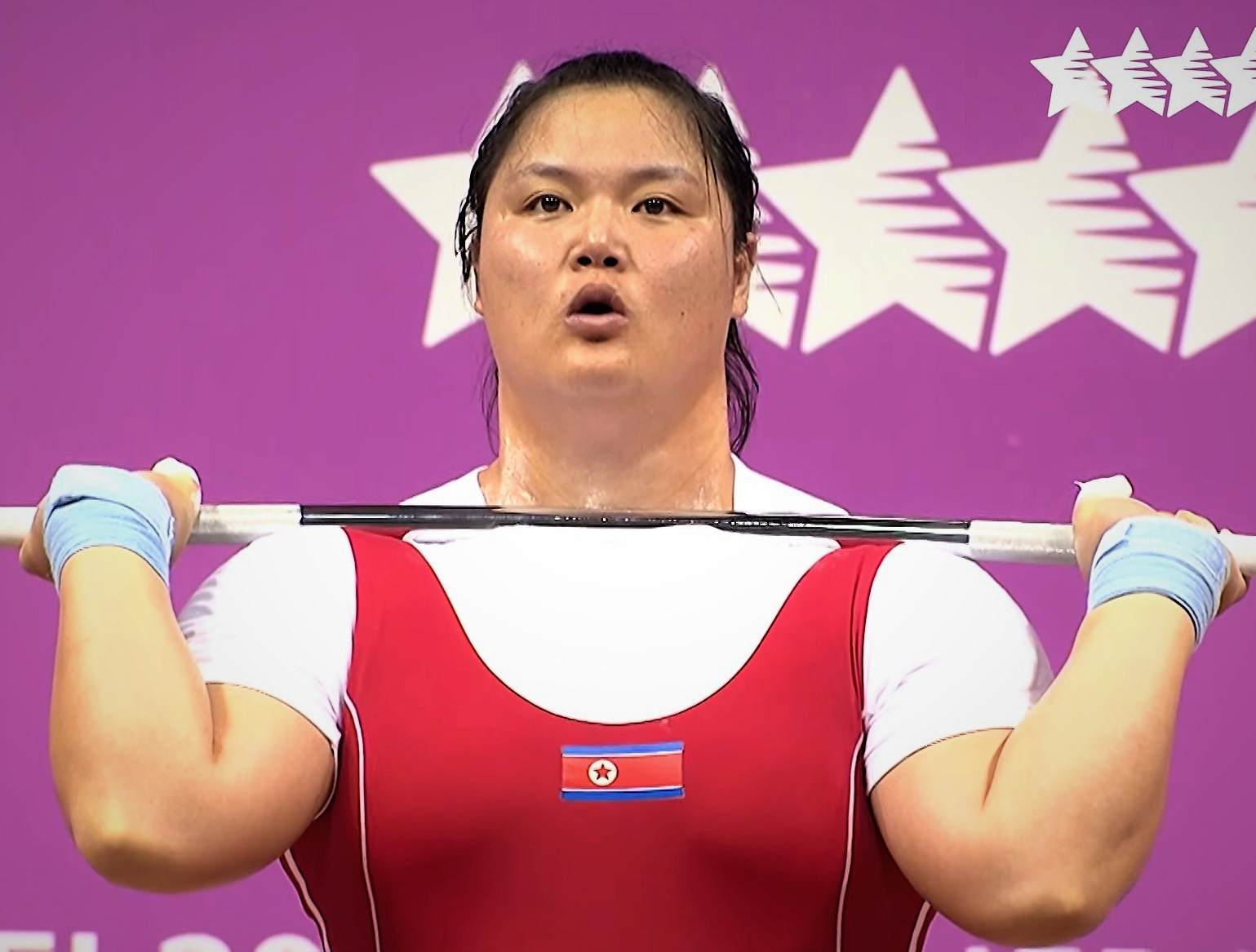
- Kim Kuk-hyang at the 2017 Summer Universiade

Personal information
- Nationality: North Korean
- Born: 20 April 1993 (age 33) Changyon County, North Korea
- Height: 1.70 m (5 ft 7 in)
- Weight: 100 kg (220 lb)

Sport
- Country: North Korea
- Sport: Weightlifting
- Event: +75 kg

Achievements and titles
- Personal bests: Snatch: 131 kg (2015 & 2016); Clean and jerk: 175 kg (2016); Total: 306 kg (2016)
Medal record
Olympic Games
Silver medal – second place	2016 Rio de Janeiro	+75 kg
World Championships
Bronze medal – third place	2015 Houston	+75 kg
Bronze medal – third place	2018 Ashgabat	+87 kg
Summer Universiade
Gold medal – first place	2017 Taipei	+75 kg
Asian Games
Gold medal – first place	2018 Jakarta-Palembang	+75 kg
Asian Championships
Silver medal – second place	2015 Phuket	+75 kg
Gold medal – first place	2016 Tashkent	+75 kg
Silver medal – second place	2017 Ashgabat	+90 kg
Youth Olympic Games
Bronze medal – third place	2010 Singapore	+63 kg
Youth World Championships
Gold medal – first place	2009 Chiang Mai	+69 kg
Junior Asian Championships
Disqualified	2012 Yangoon	+75 kg
Youth Asian Championships
Gold medal – first place	2010 Tashkent	+69 kg

Korean name
- Hangul: 김국향
- RR: Gim Gukhyang
- MR: Kim Kukhyang

Kim Kuk-hyang (Korean pronunciation: [kim.ɡu.kʰjaŋ] or [kim] [ku.kʰjaŋ]; born 20 April 1993) is a North Korean weightlifter who won the silver medal in the women's +75 kg weight class at the 2015 Asian Weightlifting Championships.

She won the silver medal at the women's +75 kg event at the 2016 Summer Olympics.

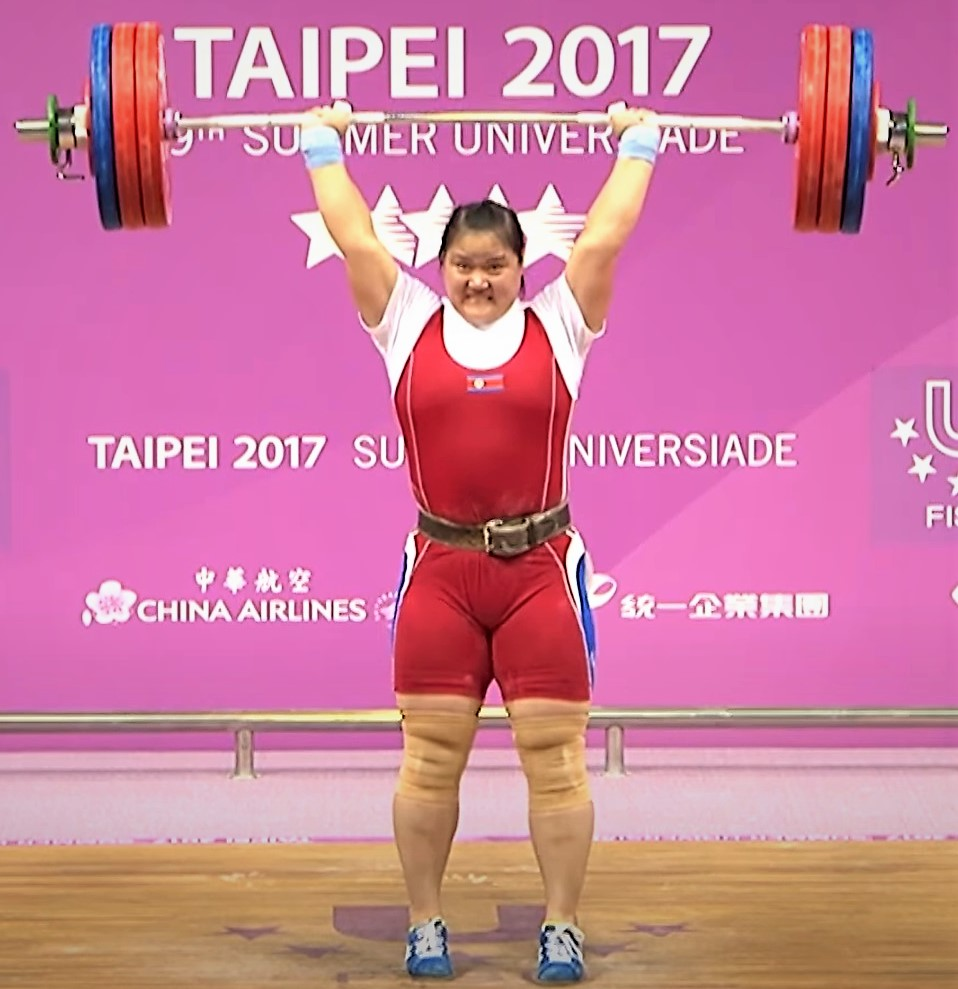
Kim Kuk-hyang at the 2017 Summer Universiade

Kuk-hyang was born in Changyon County, South Hwanghae Province, North Korea. She was raised by her mother and was later orphaned, to be raised by the state. She was noticed by weightlifting coach Kim Myong Ho at a hospital in Pyongyang when helping her mother get medical treatment; she was helping her mother up the stairs when the coach asked if she wanted to become a weightlifter. As her mother's health was failing, the coach would often visit her in hospital and promised to raise her daughter. Myong Ho was a demanding coach who also acted as her father. At age 16, she was injured as the first world junior weight lifting championship neared. After recuperating, she was looked after by national-level coaches and a medical group, who oversaw her nutrition using a scientific approach. She was chosen one of the top ten athletes of 2016 and was awarded the title of "Merited Athlete" in her home country.
