= Laurel Hubbard =

New Zealand weightlifter (born 1978)

Personal information
- Born: 9 February 1978 (age 48) Auckland, New Zealand
- Years active: 1998–present

Sport
- Country: New Zealand
- Sport: Weightlifting
Medal record
Women's weightlifting
Representing New Zealand
World Championships
Silver medal – second place	2017 Anaheim	+90 kg
Pacific Games
Gold medal – first place	2019 Apia	+87 kg
Commonwealth Championships
Gold medal – first place	2017 Gold Coast (Note: Oceania Championships also)	+90 kg
Gold medal – first place	2019 Apia (Note: Oceania Championships also)	+87 kg

Laurel Hubbard (born 9 February 1978) is a New Zealand weightlifter. Selected to compete at the 2020 Summer Olympics, she was the first openly transgender woman to compete in the Olympic Games. Prior to making her Olympic debut, Hubbard achieved a ranking of 7th in the IWF's women's +87 kg division.

== Career ==
While competing in male competitive categories before coming out as transgender, Hubbard set New Zealand junior records in 1998 in the newly established M105+ division in both lifts (snatch 135 kg, clean & jerk 170 kg) as well as total (300 kg). Those records were later surpassed by David Liti. Hubbard has spoken against what she calls "one of the misconceptions that's out there" that she had been training all her life before she transitioned, stating that she ceased lifting in 2001, explaining, "it just became too much to bear ... just the pressure of trying to fit into a world that perhaps wasn't really set up for people like myself".

In 2012, Hubbard transitioned to female. She began hormone therapy that year. Hubbard competed in international weightlifting for the first time in 2017.

At the 2017 Australian International & Australian Open in Melbourne, she competed at the heaviest +90 kg category, winning the gold medal with a 123 kg snatch and 145 kg clean & jerk, for a total of 268 kg at a bodyweight of 131.83 kg. She thus became the first trans woman to win an international weightlifting title for New Zealand. Although Hubbard met eligibility requirements to compete, her win was met with criticism, with some other competitors saying the competition was unfair. Athletes that were critical of the decision to allow Hubbard to compete include Iuniarra Sipaia, Toafitu Perive, Deborah Acason and Tracey Lambrechs. Australian Weightlifting Federation's chief executive, Michael Keelan, said it was unfair to other competitors.

Hubbard qualified for the 2018 Commonwealth Games, but an elbow injury during the competition forced her withdrawal from the event while leading the field. After the injury, Hubbard announced her probable retirement from weightlifting.

Hubbard later returned to the sport, winning two gold medals at the 2019 Pacific Games in Samoa. The decision to allow Hubbard to compete was subsequently criticised by the Samoa 2019 chairman, Loau Solamalemalo Keneti Sio, and Samoa's Prime Minister, Tuilaepa Aiono Sailele Malielegaoi.

In the 2020 qualification event, she won the gold medal in the women's +87 kg event at the Roma 2020 World Cup in Rome, Italy.

=== 2020 Olympics ===
The International Olympic Committee (IOC) let the International Weightlifting Federation (IWF) set the requirements for transgender weightlifters to compete at the Olympics. Hubbard met all the requirements and on 21 June 2021, the New Zealand Olympic Committee (NZOC) confirmed that Hubbard had been selected for the New Zealand Olympic team to compete in the women's +87 kilogram category, becoming the oldest weightlifter to qualify for the games. This decision resulted in Hubbard becoming the first openly transgender athlete to be selected to compete in the Olympic Games. Transgender athletes had been allowed to compete at the Olympics since 2004, with the relevant criteria in place since 2015.

The inclusion of Hubbard was welcomed by supporters within the trans community as a step towards more inclusion at the Games. It was criticised by others. Some athletes, scientists and campaigners said that she had a biological advantage due to having gone through male puberty. Weightlifters including Anna Van Bellinghen and Tracey Lambrechs were critical of Hubbard's selection, while Charisma Amoe-Tarrant, who qualified in the same category, supported Hubbard's participation. There were public expressions of support from New Zealand Prime Minister, Jacinda Ardern, and sport minister Grant Robertson. The IOC's Medical and Scientific Director Richard Budgett, had advocated for more research into trans participation in sports.

At 43 she was the fourth oldest weightlifter to compete at the Olympics and was seen as a medal contender. In front of a large contingent of media Hubbard struggled, with three failed snatch lifts, placing last in her group. Afterwards she thanked the IOC, IWF, NZOC and all her supporters in New Zealand for their encouragement and help throughout the competition. Later Hubbard hinted at retirement, saying that age had caught up with her.

=== Major results ===
Year	Venue	Weight	Snatch (kg)				Clean & Jerk (kg)				Total	Rank
Year	Venue	Weight	1	2	3	Rank	1	2	3	Rank	Total	Rank
Olympic Games
2021	Tokyo, Japan	+87 kg	~~120~~	~~125~~	~~125~~	---	---	---	---	---	---	DNF
World Championships
2019	Pattaya, Thailand	+87 kg	120	125	131	4	145	~~150~~	154	8	285	6
2017	Anaheim, United States	+90 kg	120	124	~~127~~	2nd place, silver medalist(s)	144	147	151	4	275	2nd place, silver medalist(s)
Commonwealth Games
2018	Gold Coast, Australia	+90 kg	120	~~127~~	~~132~~	1	---	---	---	---	---	DNF
Oceania Championships
2019	Apia, Samoa	+87 kg	112	118	125	1	133	143	~~148~~	1	268	1st place, gold medalist(s)
2017	Gold Coast, Australia	+90 kg	120	127	~~133~~	1	140	146	~~152~~	1	273	1st place, gold medalist(s)
Commonwealth Championships
2019	Apia, Samoa	+87 kg	112	118	125	1	133	143	~~148~~	1	268	1st place, gold medalist(s)
2017	Gold Coast, Australia	+90 kg	120	127	~~133~~	1	140	146	~~152~~	1	273	1st place, gold medalist(s)
Pacific Games
2019	Apia, Samoa	+87 kg	112	118	125	1st place, gold medalist(s)	133	143	~~148~~	2nd place, silver medalist(s)	268	1st place, gold medalist(s)
Arafura Games
2019	Darwin, Australia	+87 kg	~~110~~	~~110~~	~~110~~	---	---	---	---	---	---	DNF
World Masters Games
2017	Auckland, New Zealand	+90 kg	120	127	131	1	135	143	149	1	280	1st place, gold medalist(s)

== Personal life ==
Hubbard's father is Dick Hubbard, a former Mayor of Auckland City and the founder of Hubbard Foods.

In 2017, Hubbard told an interviewer that she began participating in weight lifting when she was living as male because she hoped it would enable her to become masculine.

Hubbard rarely gives interviews to the media. Commenting on criticism she receives for participating in women's weightlifting as a transgender athlete, Hubbard said in 2017,

"All you can do is focus on the task at hand and if you keep doing that it will get you through. I'm mindful I won't be supported by everyone but I hope that people can keep an open mind and perhaps look at my performance in a broader context. Perhaps the fact that it has taken so long for someone like myself to come through indicates that some of the problems that people are suggesting aren't what they might seem."
