= Purnima Pandey =

Indian weightlifter (born 1997)

Personal information
- Full name: Purnima Pandey
- Nationality: Indian
- Born: 16 October 1997 (age 28) Varanasi, Uttar Pradesh, India
- Height: 169 cm (5 ft 7 in)
- Weight: 98 kg (216 lb)

Sport
- Sport: Weightlifting
- Event: women's +87 kg
Medal record
Commonwealth Weightlifting Championships
Gold medal – first place	2021 Tashkent	+87 kg
Commonwealth Junior Weightlifting Championships
Gold medal – first place	2016 Penang	+75 kg
Silver medal – second place	2017 Gold Coast	+90 kg
Asian Youth Weightlifting Championships
Bronze medal – third place	2016 Tokyo	+69 kg

Purnima Pandey (born 16 October 1997) is an Indian weightlifter. Purnima Pandey created eight national records on the way to a gold in the women's +87 kg category at the 2021 Commonwealth Weightlifting Championships at Tashkent. In July 2022 she placed sixth in the women's +87 kg weightlifting event at the 2022 Commonwealth Games.
