= Tatiana Kashirina =

Russian weightlifter (born 1991)

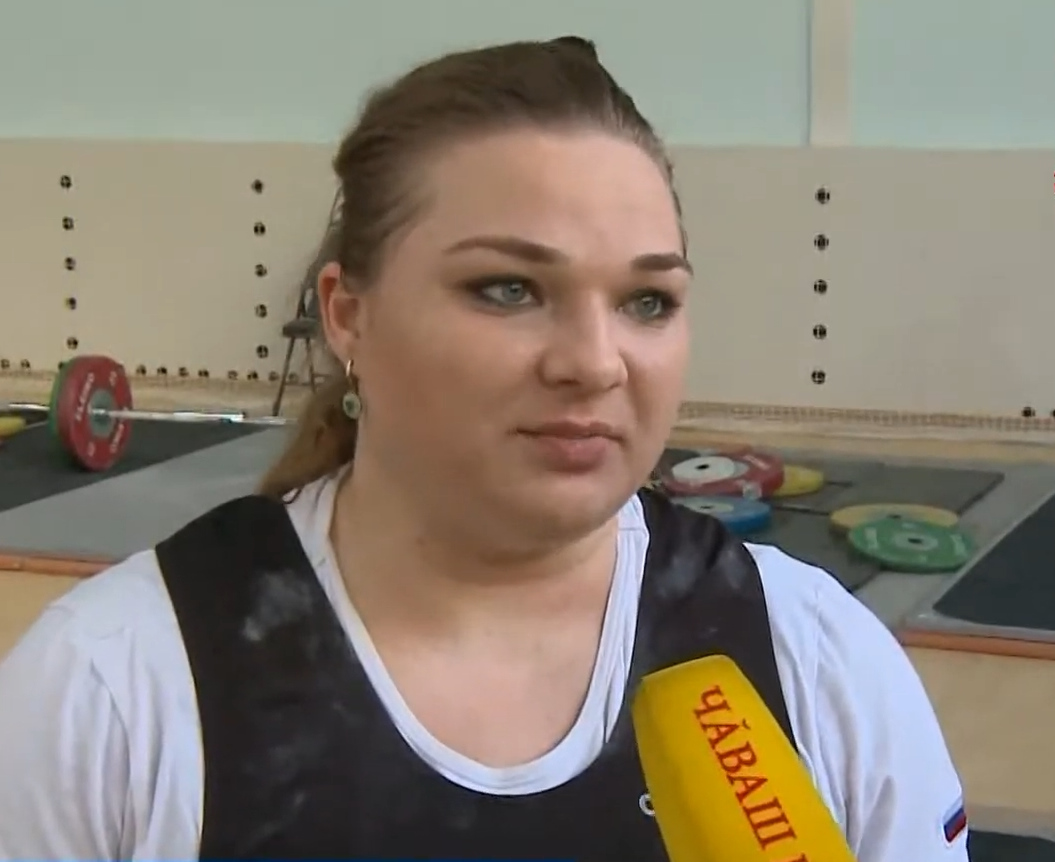
- Kashirina in 2017

Personal information
- Full name: Tatiana Yuryevna Kashirina
- Nationality: Russian
- Born: 24 January 1991 (age 35) Noginsk, Russian SFSR, Soviet Union
- Height: 1.77 m (5 ft 10 in)
- Weight: 87 kg (192 lb)

Sport
- Country: Russia
- Sport: Weightlifting
- Event: +87 kg
- Club: Dynamo
- Coached by: Vladimir Krasnov

Achievements and titles
- Personal bests: Annulled for doping: Snatch: 155 kg (2014, WR); Clean and jerk: 193 kg (2014, WR); Total: 348 kg (2014, WR)
Medal record
Olympic Games
| Silver medal – second place | 2012 London | +75 kg |
World Championships
| Gold medal – first place | 2010 Antalya | +75 kg |
| Gold medal – first place | 2018 Ashgabat | +87 kg |
| Silver medal – second place | 2009 Goyang | +75 kg |
| Silver medal – second place | 2011 Paris | +75 kg |
| Silver medal – second place | 2019 Pattaya | +87 kg |
European Championships
| Gold medal – first place | 2009 Bucharest | +75 kg |
| Gold medal – first place | 2010 Minsk | +75 kg |
| Gold medal – first place | 2011 Kazan | +75 kg |
| Gold medal – first place | 2012 Antalya | +75 kg |
| Gold medal – first place | 2019 Batumi | +87 kg |

Tatiana Yuryevna Kashirina (Russian: Татьяна Юрьевна Каширина; born 24 January 1991) is a Russian Olympic weightlifter, Olympic silver medalist, five time World Champion and eight time European Champion competing in the +90 kg and +75 kg categories until 2018 and +87 kg starting in 2018 after the International Weightlifting Federation reorganized the categories. On 9 September 2023, the Court of Arbitration for Sport annulled over four years of her results due to drugs offenses, stating, "All the competitive results obtained by Tatiana Kashirina from 1 April 2013 until 19 June 2017 were disqualified, with all the resulting consequences, including the forfeiture of any titles, awards, medals, points and prize and appearance money."

== Career ==
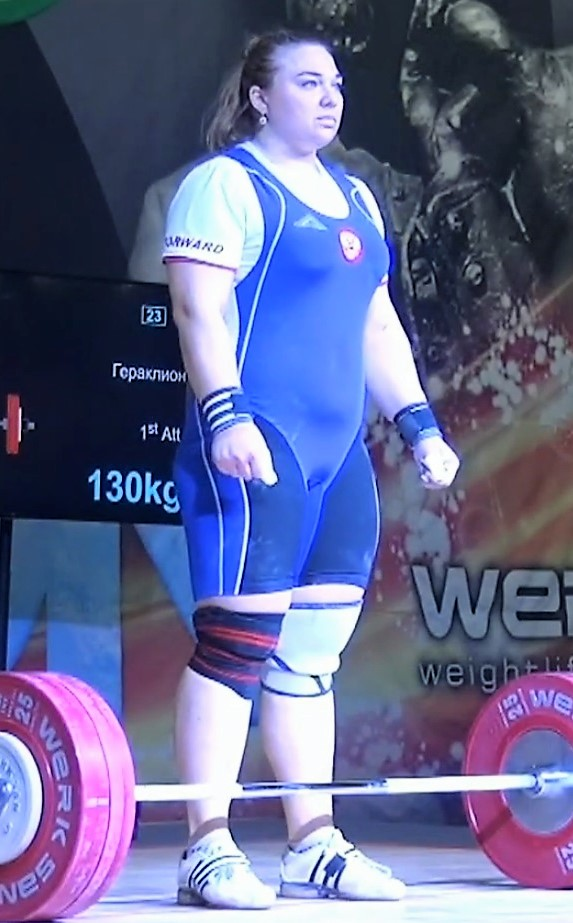
Kashirina in 2019

Kashirina won the world championship five times (2010, 2013, 2014, 2015, and 2018) in the +75 kg and +87 kg categories. She won the silver medal at the 2012 Summer Olympics in the Woman's +75 kg category with a total of 332 kg and the world record in a snatch (151 kg).

Before weight classes were restructured, Tatiana held the clean and jerk world record of 193 kg as well as the snatch world record of 155 kg and total world record of 348 kg. Kashirina has set 23 senior world records throughout her weightlifting career.

She also held all three world records in the Junior +75 kg class; the snatch world record of 148 kg the clean and jerk world record of 181 kg as well as the total world record of 327 kg.

=== Doping sanctions ===
In September 2006, Kashirina was suspended from competition for two years after failing an anti-doping control. In December 2020 she was again provisionally suspended as a consequence of anti-doping investigations, missing the 2021 European Weightlifting Championships and the 2020 Summer Olympics in Tokyo. On 9 September 2023, the Court of Arbitration for Sport annulled over four years of her results due to drugs offenses, stating, "All the competitive results obtained by Tatiana Kashirina from 1 April 2013 until 19 June 2017 were disqualified, with all the resulting consequences, including the forfeiture of any titles, awards, medals, points and prize and appearance money." As a result, she was stripped of three world titles and three European titles. She was also suspended for a period of eight years, beginning in August 2023.

| Year | Venue | Weight | Snatch (kg) | | | | Clean & Jerk (kg) | | | | Total | Rank |
| Year | Venue | Weight | 1 | 2 | 3 | Rank | 1 | 2 | 3 | Rank | Total | Rank |
Olympic Games
| 2012 | London, United Kingdom | +75 kg | 144 | 149 WR | 151 WR | 1 | 175 | 181 | ~~187~~ | 2 | 332 WR | 2nd place, silver medalist(s) |
World Championships
| 2009 | Goyang, South Korea | +75 kg | 130 | 135 | 138 | 1st place, gold medalist(s) | 160 | 165 | ~~168~~ | 2nd place, silver medalist(s) | 303 | 2nd place, silver medalist(s) |
| 2010 | Antalya, Turkey | +75 kg | 135 | 141 WR | 145 WR | 1st place, gold medalist(s) | 165 | 170 | ~~175~~ | 3rd place, bronze medalist(s) | 315 | 1st place, gold medalist(s) |
| 2011 | Paris, France | +75 kg | 140 | 145 | 147 WR | 1st place, gold medalist(s) | ~~175~~ | 175 | ~~181~~ | 2nd place, silver medalist(s) | 322 | 2nd place, silver medalist(s) |
| 2013 | Wrocław, Poland | +75 kg | 142 | ~~147~~ | ~~147~~ | DSQ | 180 | 190 DSQ | ~~192~~ | DSQ | 332 | DSQ |
| 2014 | Almaty, Kazakhstan | +75 kg | 145 | 152 DSQ | 155 DSQ | DSQ | 185 | 193 DSQ | -- | DSQ | 348 DSQ | DSQ |
| 2015 | Houston, United States | +75 kg | 143 | 148 | ~~152~~ | DSQ | ~~185~~ | 185 | ~~191~~ | DSQ | 333 | DSQ |
| 2018 | Ashgabat, Turkmenistan | +87 kg | 140 | ~~145~~ | 145 WR | 1st place, gold medalist(s) | 178 WR | 182 WR | 185 WR | 1st place, gold medalist(s) | 330 WR | 1st place, gold medalist(s) |
| 2019 | Pattaya, Thailand | +87 kg | ~~140~~ | ~~140~~ | 140 | 2nd place, silver medalist(s) | ~~173~~ | 173 | 178 | 2nd place, silver medalist(s) | 318 | 2nd place, silver medalist(s) |
European Championships
| 2009 | Bucharest, Romania | +75 kg | 117 | 122 | 125 | 1st place, gold medalist(s) | 150 | 155 | ~~160~~ | 1st place, gold medalist(s) | 280 | 1st place, gold medalist(s) |
| 2010 | Minsk, Belarus | +75 kg | 125 | 130 | 135 | 1st place, gold medalist(s) | 155 | 162 | ~~170~~ | 1st place, gold medalist(s) | 297 | 1st place, gold medalist(s) |
| 2011 | Kazan, Russia | +75 kg | 137 | 142 | 146 WR | 1st place, gold medalist(s) | 170 | 177 | 181 | 1st place, gold medalist(s) | 327 WR | 1st place, gold medalist(s) |
| 2012 | Antalya, Turkey | +75 kg | 145 | ~~149~~ | ~~149~~ | 1st place, gold medalist(s) | 177 | 183 | ~~188~~ | 1st place, gold medalist(s) | 328 | 1st place, gold medalist(s) |
| 2014 | Tel Aviv, Israel | +75 kg | 138 | 143 | ~~148~~ | DSQ | 172 | 180 | -- | DSQ | 323 | DSQ |
| 2015 | (Georgia (country)) Tbilisi, Georgia | +75 kg | 127 | 137 | 142 | DSQ | 162 | 172 | 180 | DSQ | 322 | DSQ |
| 2017 | Split, Croatia | +90 kg | 132 | 137 | ~~140~~ | DSQ | 168 | 178 | 180 | DSQ | 317 | DSQ |
| 2019 | (Georgia (country)) Batumi, Georgia | +87 kg | 140 | 146 WR | ~~150~~ | 1st place, gold medalist(s) | 174 | 180 | 185 | 1st place, gold medalist(s) | 331 CWR | 1st place, gold medalist(s) |
Summer Universiade
| 2013 | Kazan, Russia | +75 kg | 132 | 137 | 142 | DSQ | 162 | 172 | 177 | DSQ | 319 | DSQ |
IWF World Cup
| 2019 | Fuzhou, China | +87 kg | 135 | 140 | 145 | 1st place, gold medalist(s) | ~~175~~ | 175 | 178 | 3rd place, bronze medalist(s) | 323 | 3rd place, bronze medalist(s) |
IWF Grand Prix
| 2011 | Belgorod, Russia | +75 kg | 135 | 143 | 148 WR | 1 | 165 | 175 | ~~181~~ | 1 | 323 | 1st place, gold medalist(s) |
| 2012 | Saint Petersburg, Russia | +75 kg | 117 | 122 | 125 | 1 | 145 | 150 | 155 | 1 | 280 | 1st place, gold medalist(s) |
| 2013 | Moscow, Russia | +75 kg | 138 | 143 | 148 | DSQ | 168 | 178 | 186 | DSQ | 334 DSQ | DSQ |
Tokyo 2020 Test Event
| 2019 | Tokyo, Japan | +87 kg | 140 | ~~145~~ | ~~146~~ | 2nd place, silver medalist(s) | 178 | 182 | ~~187~~ | 2nd place, silver medalist(s) | 322 | 2nd place, silver medalist(s) |
