= Charisma Amoe-Tarrant =

Nauruan weightlifter (born 1999)

Personal information
- Full name: Charisma Precious Amoe-Tarrant
- Nationality: Nauruan/Australian
- Born: 26 May 1999 (age 27)
- Height: 165 cm (5 ft 5 in)
- Weight: 154 kg (340 lb)

Sport
- Sport: Weightlifting
- Event: Weightlifting +90kg
Medal record
Women's weightlifting
Representing Nauru
Commonwealth Games
Silver medal – second place	2018 Gold Coast	+90 kg
Oceania Championships
Gold medal – first place	2018 Le Mont-Dore	+90 kg
Representing Australia
Commonwealth Games
Bronze medal – third place	2022 Birmingham	+87 kg
Pacific Games
Bronze medal – third place	2019 Apia	+87 kg snatch

Charisma Precious Amoe-Tarrant (born 26 May 1999) is a Nauruan-born Australian weightlifter. She competed in the women's +90 kg event at the 2018 Commonwealth Games, winning the silver medal for Nauru. Amoe-Tarrant was selected for the Australian team at the Pacific Games held in Samoa in 2019, winning a bronze medal for the +87 kg snatch. She qualified to represent Australia at the 2020 Summer Olympics in Tokyo, Japan. She finished in 6th place in the women's +87 kg event with a total lift of 243 kg. Australia at the 2020 Summer Olympics details her performance in depth.

== Personal life ==
Amoe-Tarrant's uncle died of cancer when she was young, and in 2009 her mother died of kidney problems; she has stated that her late family members are inspirations in her weightlifting career. She lived in Nauru until 2011 when she and her siblings moved to Australia to live with their grandfather.
