= Sarah Robles =

American weightlifter (born 1988)

Personal information
- Nationality: American
- Born: August 1, 1988 (age 38) San Diego, California
- Height: 1.79 m (5 ft 10 in)
- Weight: 140 kg (309 lb)

Sport
- Country: United States
- Sport: Weightlifting
- Event: +87kg
- Club: Team Houston
- Coached by: Tim Swords

Achievements and titles
- Olympic finals: two time bronze medalist (2016 & 2020)
- World finals: 2017 senior world champion 2008 junior world silver medalist
- Regional finals: five time Pan American champion (2017-2020; 2022) 2019 Pan American Games champion 2010 Pan American silver medalist
- National finals: eleven time national champion
- Personal bests: Snatch: 128 kg (2018); Clean and jerk: 162 kg (2018) AM; Total: 290 kg (2018) AM
Medal record
Representing the United States
Olympic Games
Bronze medal – third place	2016 Rio de Janeiro	+75 kg
Bronze medal – third place	2020 Tokyo	+87 kg
World Championships
Gold medal – first place	2017 Anaheim	+90 kg
World Junior Championships
Silver medal – second place	2008 Cali	+75 kg
Pan American Games
Gold medal – first place	2019 Lima	+87 kg
Pan American Championships
Gold medal – first place	2017 Miami	+90 kg
Gold medal – first place	2018 Santo Domingo	+90 kg
Gold medal – first place	2019 Guatemala City	+87 kg
Gold medal – first place	2020 Santo Domingo	+87 kg
Gold medal – first place	2022 Bogotá	+87 kg
Silver medal – second place	2010 Guatemala City	+75 kg
Silver medal – second place	2023 Bariloche	+87 kg
Disqualified	2013 Margarita Island	+75 kg

Sarah Elizabeth Robles (born August 1, 1988) is an American weightlifter. She qualified for the 2012 Summer Olympics in London and earned a bronze medal in weightlifting at the 2016 Summer Olympics in Rio de Janeiro, becoming the first US athlete to medal in Olympic weightlifting in 16 years. She repeated her feat in the +87 kg category at the 2020 Olympic Games in Tokyo, once again earning bronze, and becoming the first US woman to earn two Olympic weightlifting medals.

== Career ==
Growing up in Desert Hot Springs, California, Robles competed in throwing events at San Jacinto High School in San Jacinto, California. Top-ranked in shot put, she earned scholarships to the University of Alabama and Arizona State University. As part of her shot put training at a local Arizona gym under coach Joe Micela, she began doing Olympic-style lifts in 2008. That same year, after only three months of weightlifting, Robles qualified for nationals and stopped competing in shot put, losing her scholarship in the process.

=== Competition ===
Robles won the silver medal at a 2010 Pan American competition and became a three time national champion.

At the 2011 World Championships, she finished in eleventh place in her weight class but first place among American women weightlifters. Robles qualified as one of two American women to compete in the 2012 Summer Olympics in London.

==== 2012 Summer Olympics ====
Despite being the highest-ranked weightlifter in the United States, Robles lived on less than $400 a month leading up to the 2012 Summer Olympics in London. Commentators have suggested that this was the result both of the lack of popular attention to the sport of weightlifting, as well as Robles and other women in the sport having larger body types than those of women athletes traditionally portrayed in mass media. Robles has been quoted as saying that, "You can get that sponsorship if you're a super-built guy or a girl who looks good in a bikini. But not if you're a girl who's built like a guy." As of July 16, 2012, a company called Solve Media was Robles's sponsor.

In competition, Robles came in 6th place in the +75kg, lifting 120 kilograms (265 lb) in the snatch, and 145 kilograms (320 lb) with the clean and jerk for a total of 265 kilograms (584 lb).

==== Doping controversy ====
On June 29, 2013, Robles failed a test for "DHEA, testosterone, and pregnanediol", and on August 8, 2013, was sanctioned by the International Weightlifting Federation. and the United States Anti-Doping Agency, which cited the discovery as "the presence of an exogenous androgenic anabolic steroid and/or its metabolites", removing her from competition for two years.

Robles disputed the doping accusation, asserting that treatment for polyendocrine metabolic ovarian syndrome (PMOS) (formerly known as polycystic ovary syndrome (PCOS)), using Dehydroepiandrosterone (DHEA) was advised by her physician.

"My doctor and I worked together to try different treatment options for my PCOS, as a preventative measure. Because my progesterone and DHEA levels are naturally quite low because of PCOS, my doctor felt that supplementing with DHEA would help balance things out in my system. We did not feel that bringing my DHEA to a normal level would be contradictory to my stance as a clean athlete"

— Sarah Robles, December 12, 2013

She did not seek a therapeutic use exemption (TUE) prior. Joe Micela, Robles's coach, stated that he did not approve of the DHEA use, calling it a "stupid decision", though he did not think it impacted Robles's performance. Robles's appeal of the suspension for medical reasons was denied.

==== 2016 Summer Olympics ====
On August 14, 2016, Robles won the bronze medal in Weightlifting at the 2016 Summer Olympics – Women's +75 kg with a snatch of 126 kilograms (278 lb) and a clean and jerk of 160 kilograms (353 lb) for a total of 286 kilograms (631 lb). She was the first athlete from the United States to win a medal in Olympic weightlifting since the 2000 Summer Olympics.

==== 2020 Summer Olympics ====
Robles represented the United States at the 2020 Summer Olympics in Tokyo, Japan, earning bronze. Competing in the women's +87 kg event on August 2, 2021, Robles lifted 128 kilograms (282 lb) in the snatch. She then lifted 154 kilograms (340 lb) in her clean and jerk, for a total of 282 kilograms (622 lb).

==== 2022 ====
She won the gold medal in the women's +87 kg event at the 2022 Pan American Weightlifting Championships held in Bogotá, Colombia. She also won the gold medals in the snatch and clean & jerk events in this competition.

==== 2023 ====
Robles won the silver medal in her event at the 2023 Pan American Weightlifting Championships held in Bariloche, Argentina.

=== Health ===
Robles has a deformity in her arm known as Madelung's deformity, which results in a radius that is shorter than normal and bowed. The deformity leads to significant pain during lifts, and Robles treats the pain with wrist wraps and warming creams.

Robles lives with polyendocrine metabolic ovarian syndrome (PMOS), which typically disrupts reproductive functions and metabolism.

== Personal life ==
Robles is a member of the Church of Jesus Christ of Latter-day Saints and is of Mexican ancestry.
