= Li Wenwen =

Chinese weightlifter (born 2000)

Li Wenwen OLY
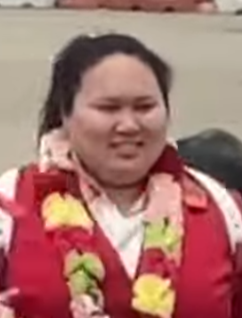
- Li in 2024

Personal information
- Native name: 李雯雯
- Nickname: Big Baby
- Nationality: Chinese
- Born: 5 March 2000 (age 26) Anshan, Liaoning, China
- Home town: Beijing, China
- Height: 1.78 m (5 ft 10 in)
- Weight: 150 kg (331 lb)

Sport
- Country: China
- Sport: Weightlifting
- Event: +87 kg
- Club: Fujian Province
- Coached by: Wu Meijin

Achievements and titles
- Personal bests: Snatch: 148 kg (2021, CWR); Clean & Jerk: 187 kg (2021, CWR); Total: 335 kg (2021, CWR)
Medal record
Women's weightlifting
Representing China
Olympic Games
Gold medal – first place	2020 Tokyo	+87 kg
Gold medal – first place	2024 Paris	+81 kg
World Championships
Gold medal – first place	2019 Pattaya	+87 kg
Gold medal – first place	2022 Bogotá	+87 kg
Asian Games
Gold medal – first place	2026 Aichi–Nagoya	+86 kg
Asian Championships
Gold medal – first place	2019 Ningbo	+87 kg
Gold medal – first place	2020 Tashkent	+87 kg
Gold medal – first place	2023 Jinju	+87 kg
National Games of China
Gold medal – first place	2021 Shaanxi	+87 kg

Li Wenwen (Chinese: 李雯雯; pinyin: Lǐ Wénwén; born 5 March 2000) is a Chinese weightlifter competing in the women's +87 kg division. She is a double Olympic champion, as well as the double world and 3 time Asian champion. In 2021, she set the current world records for both clean & jerk and snatch.

== Career ==
In 2019, Li competed at the IWF World Cup in Fuzhou, winning silver medals and setting junior world records in the snatch, clean & jerk and total in the +87 kg category. Later in 2019, she competed at the 2019 Asian Weightlifting Championships in the +87 kg category. In the snatch portion she set a world record with a lift of 147 kg, and won gold medals in all lifts.

She competed at the 2019 World Weightlifting Championships in the +87 kg division against teammate Meng Suping. She had a perfect 6 for 6 day and won gold medals in all lifts which included a world record clean & jerk of 186 kg which also set the total world record.

Li improved on her own world records at the 2020 Asian Weightlifting Championships in 2021. She increased her snatch record from 147 to 148, her clean & jerk record from 186 to 187, and her total record from 332 to 335.

She represented China at the 2020 Summer Olympics in Tokyo, Japan. She competed in the women's +87 kg event, winning the gold medal with a new Olympic record of 320 kg.

In August 2024, she finished in first place in the women's +81 kg event at the 2024 Summer Olympics held in Paris, France.

== Major results ==
Year	Venue	Weight	Snatch (kg)				Clean & Jerk (kg)				Total	Rank
Year	Venue	Weight	1	2	3	Rank	1	2	3	Rank	Total	Rank
Olympic Games
2021	Tokyo, Japan	+87 kg	130	135	140 OR	—N/a	162	173	180 OR	—N/a	320 OR	1st place, gold medalist(s)
2024	Paris, France	+81 kg	130	136	—	—N/a	167	173	~~174~~	—N/a	309	1st place, gold medalist(s)
World Championships
2019	Pattaya, Thailand	+87 kg	136	142	146	1st place, gold medalist(s)	175	182	186 WR	1st place, gold medalist(s)	332 WR	1st place, gold medalist(s)
2022	Bogotá, Colombia	+87 kg	130	~~141~~	141	1st place, gold medalist(s)	166	170	—	1st place, gold medalist(s)	311	1st place, gold medalist(s)
2023	Riyadh, Saudi Arabia	+87 kg	~~130~~	~~130~~	—	—	—	—	—	—	—	—
IWF World Cup
2019	Fuzhou, China	+87 kg	135	142	~~146~~	2nd place, silver medalist(s)	~~175~~	175	182	2nd place, silver medalist(s)	324	2nd place, silver medalist(s)
2019	Tianjin, China	+87 kg	130	138	~~142~~	1st place, gold medalist(s)	165	173	177	1st place, gold medalist(s)	315	1st place, gold medalist(s)
2024	Phuket, Thailand	+87 kg	133	140	145	1st place, gold medalist(s)	170	180	—	1st place, gold medalist(s)	325	1st place, gold medalist(s)
Asian Games
2026	Aichi–Nagoya, Japan	+86 kg	132	136	140	—N/a	166	170	~~175~~	—N/a	310	1st place, gold medalist(s)
Asian Championships
2019	Ningbo, China	+87 kg	137	142	147 WR	1st place, gold medalist(s)	175	~~180~~	~~185~~	1st place, gold medalist(s)	322	1st place, gold medalist(s)
2021	Tashkent, Uzbekistan	+87 kg	135	143	148 WR	1st place, gold medalist(s)	175	187 CWR	—	1st place, gold medalist(s)	335 CWR	1st place, gold medalist(s)
2023	Jinju, South Korea	+87 kg	130	135	140	1st place, gold medalist(s)	170	175	—	1st place, gold medalist(s)	315	1st place, gold medalist(s)
