= Son Young-hee =

South Korean weightlifter (born 1993)

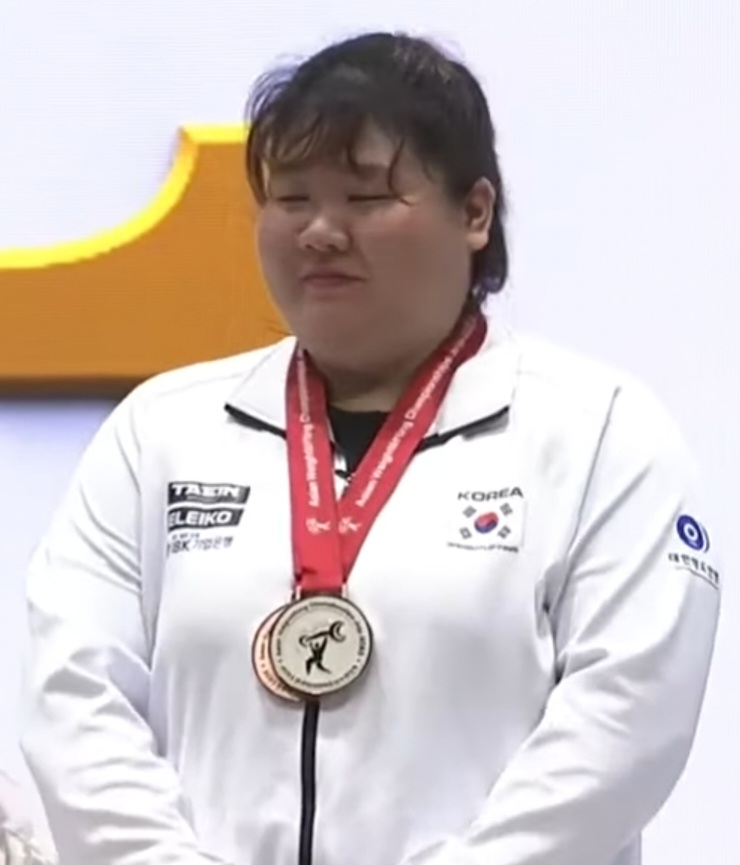

Personal information
- Born: 24 April 1993 (age 33)
- Height: 1.73 m (5 ft 8 in)
- Weight: 110 kg (240 lb)

Korean name
- Hangul: 손영희
- RR: Son Yeonghui
- MR: Son Yŏnghŭi

Sport
- Country: South Korea
- Sport: Weightlifting
- Event: Women's +75 kg
Medal record
World Championships
| Gold medal – first place | 2021 Tashkent | +87 kg |
| Bronze medal – third place | 2024 Manama | +87 kg |
Asian Games
| Silver medal – second place | 2018 Jakarta-Palembang | +75 kg |
| Silver medal – second place | 2022 Hangzhou | +87 kg |
Asian Championships
| Silver medal – second place | 2020 Tashkent | +87 kg |
| Silver medal – second place | 2024 Tashkent | +87 kg |
| Bronze medal – third place | 2023 Jinju | +87 kg |
| Bronze medal – third place | 2025 Jiangshan | +87 kg |

Son Young-hee (Korean: 손영희; born 24 April 1993) is a South Korean weightlifter. She competed in the women's +75 kg event at the 2016 Summer Olympics in Rio de Janeiro, Brazil. She won the gold medal in the women's +87 kg event at the 2021 World Weightlifting Championships held in Tashkent, Uzbekistan.
