= 2008 Summer Olympics medal table =

2008 Summer Olympics medals
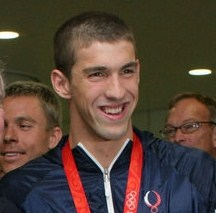
- Michael Phelps (pictured) won eight medals at the 2008 Summer Olympics, the most of any competing athlete
- Location: Beijing, China

Highlights
- Most gold medals: China (48)
- Most total medals: United States (112)
- Medalling NOCs: 87

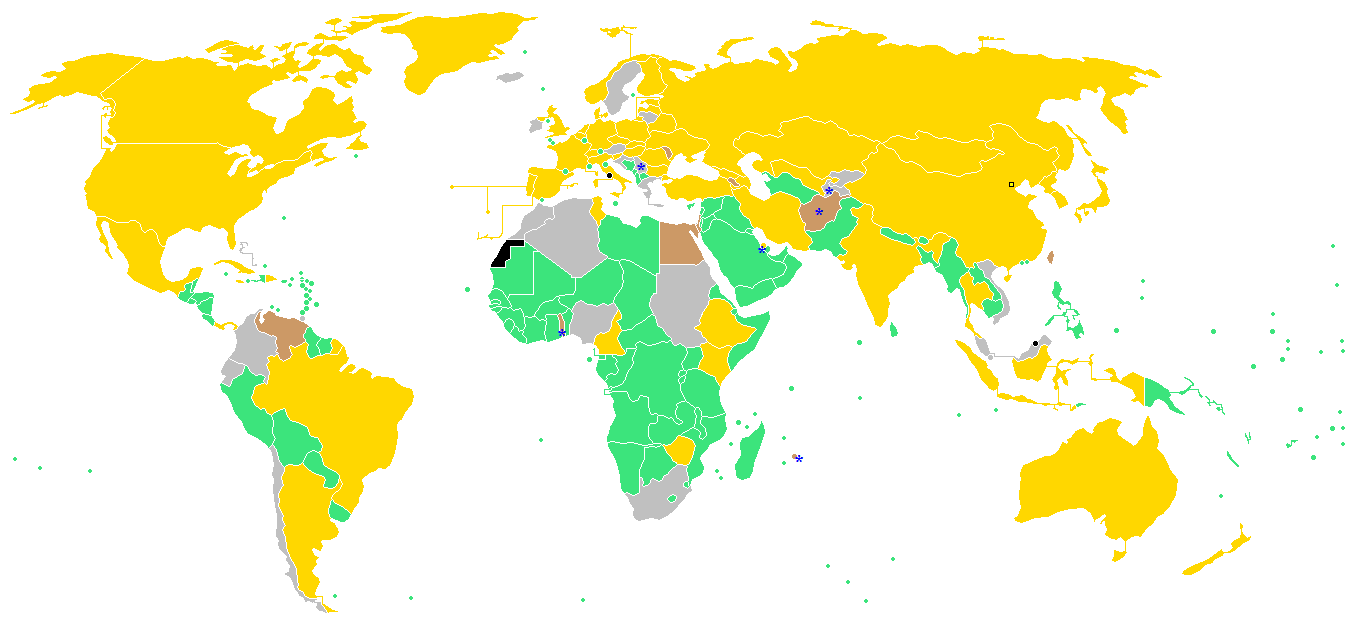
Map of the world showing the achievements of each country during the 2008 Summer Olympics in Beijing, People's Republic of China. Gold for countries achieving at least one gold medal. Silver for countries achieving at least one silver medal. Brown for countries achieving at least one bronze medal. Green for countries that did not win a medal. Black for countries that did not participate. A yellow square displays the host city (Beijing). Blue asterisks display countries achieving their first medal ever in a Summer Olympics.

The 2008 Summer Olympics, officially known as the Games of the XXIX Olympiad, were a summer multi-sport event held in Beijing, the capital of the People's Republic of China, from 8 to 24 August 2008. Approximately 10,942 athletes from 204 National Olympic Committees (NOCs) participated in 302 events in 28 sports across 41 disciplines. Cycling BMX racing and 10 km (6.2 mi) marathon swimming were included as official medal events for the first time in history. The Marshall Islands, Montenegro and Tuvalu made their Summer Olympic debuts in Beijing.

Overall, athletes from a record 87 countries won at least one medal, and 55 of them won at least one gold medal. Afghanistan, Mauritius, Sudan, Tajikistan and Togo won their first Olympic medals of any kind. Athletes from Mongolia (which previously held the record for most medals without a gold) and Panama won their first Olympic gold medals. Serbian swimmer Milorad Čavić won the first medal for the country as an independent state. Samoa won its first Olympic medal due to a reallocation of medals after the International Olympic Committee (IOC) retested doping samples in 2016.

Athletes from the host nation China won the most gold medals, with 48, while athletes from the United States won the most medals overall, with 112. Among individual participants, American swimmer Michael Phelps won the most gold medals and the most total medals with eight each, breaking Mark Spitz's 1972 record for the most gold medals won at an Olympic Games.

During and after the games, many athletes who were caught doping, or tested positive for banned substances, were disqualified from competition and had their medals revoked.

== Medal table ==
The medal table is based on information provided by the IOC and is consistent with IOC conventional sorting in its published medal tables. The table uses the Olympic medal table sorting method. By default, the table is ordered by the number of gold medals the athletes from a nation have won, where a nation is an entity represented by a NOC. The number of silver medals is taken into consideration next and then the number of bronze medals. If teams are still tied, equal ranking is given and they are listed alphabetically by their IOC country code.

Events in boxing result in a bronze medal being awarded to each of the two competitors who lose their semi-final matches, as opposed to fighting in a third place tie breaker. Other combat sports, which include judo, taekwondo, and wrestling, use a repechage system which also results in two bronze medals being awarded. In the women's 100 metres in athletics, there was a tie for second place which resulted in two silver medals and no bronze medal being awarded. Two bronze medals were awarded for third place ties in both the men's 100 metre backstroke and men's 100 metre freestyle swimming events.

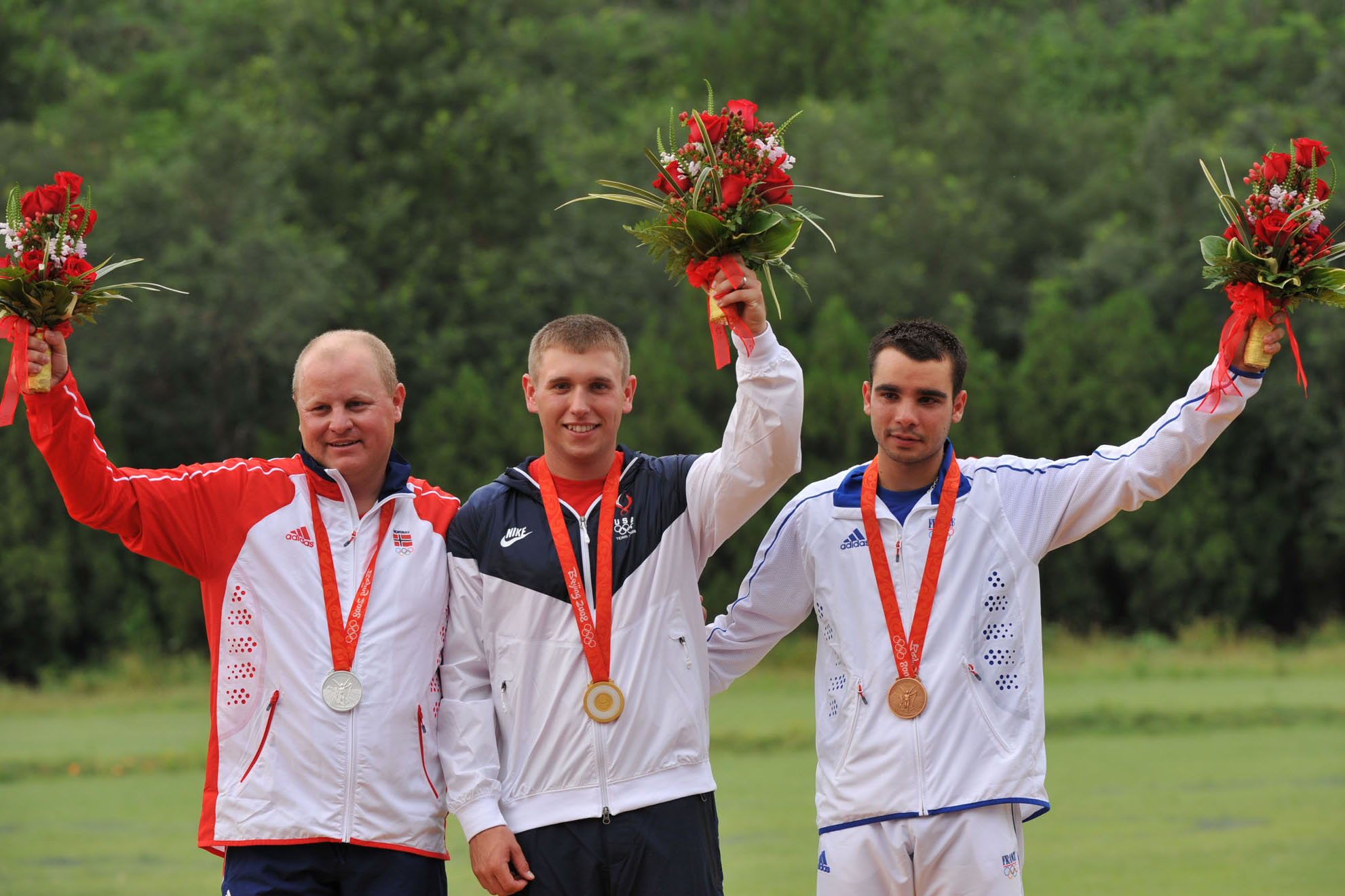
From left to right: Tore Brovold from Norway (silver), Vincent Hancock from USA (gold) and Anthony Terras from France (bronze) with the medals they earned in the men's skeet shooting.

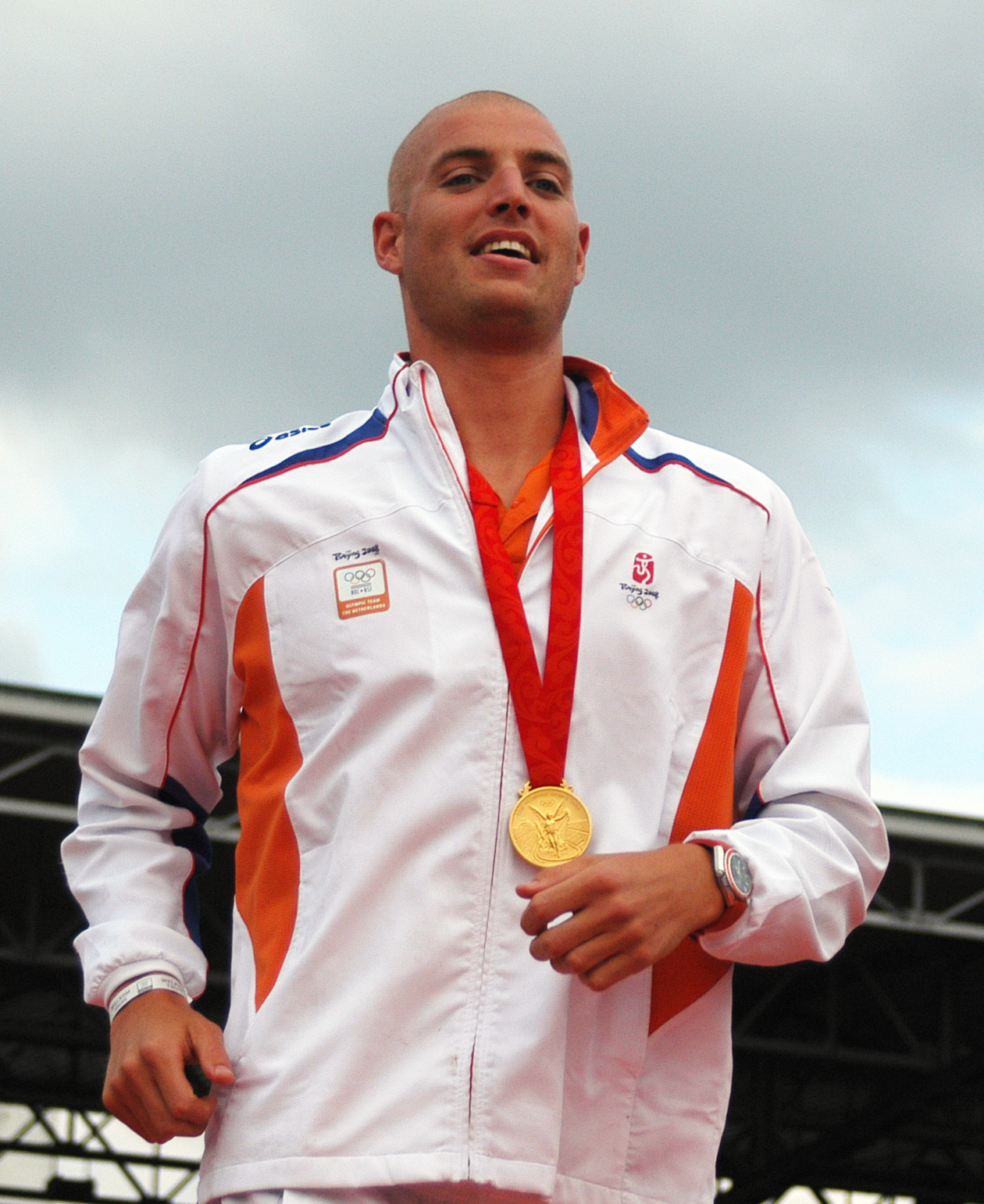
Maarten van der Weijden from the Netherlands won a gold medal in the men's 10 km open water.

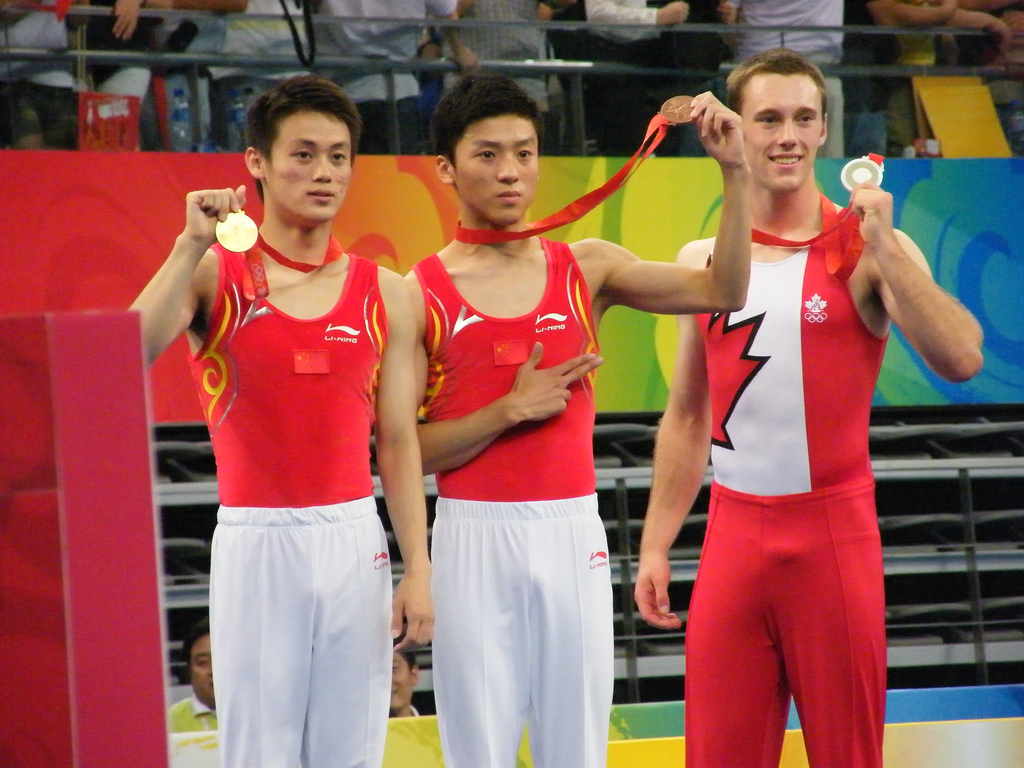
Left to right: Lu Chunlong (gold), Dong Dong (bronze), both from China, and Jason Burnett from Canada (silver) won medals in the men's trampoline gymnastics.

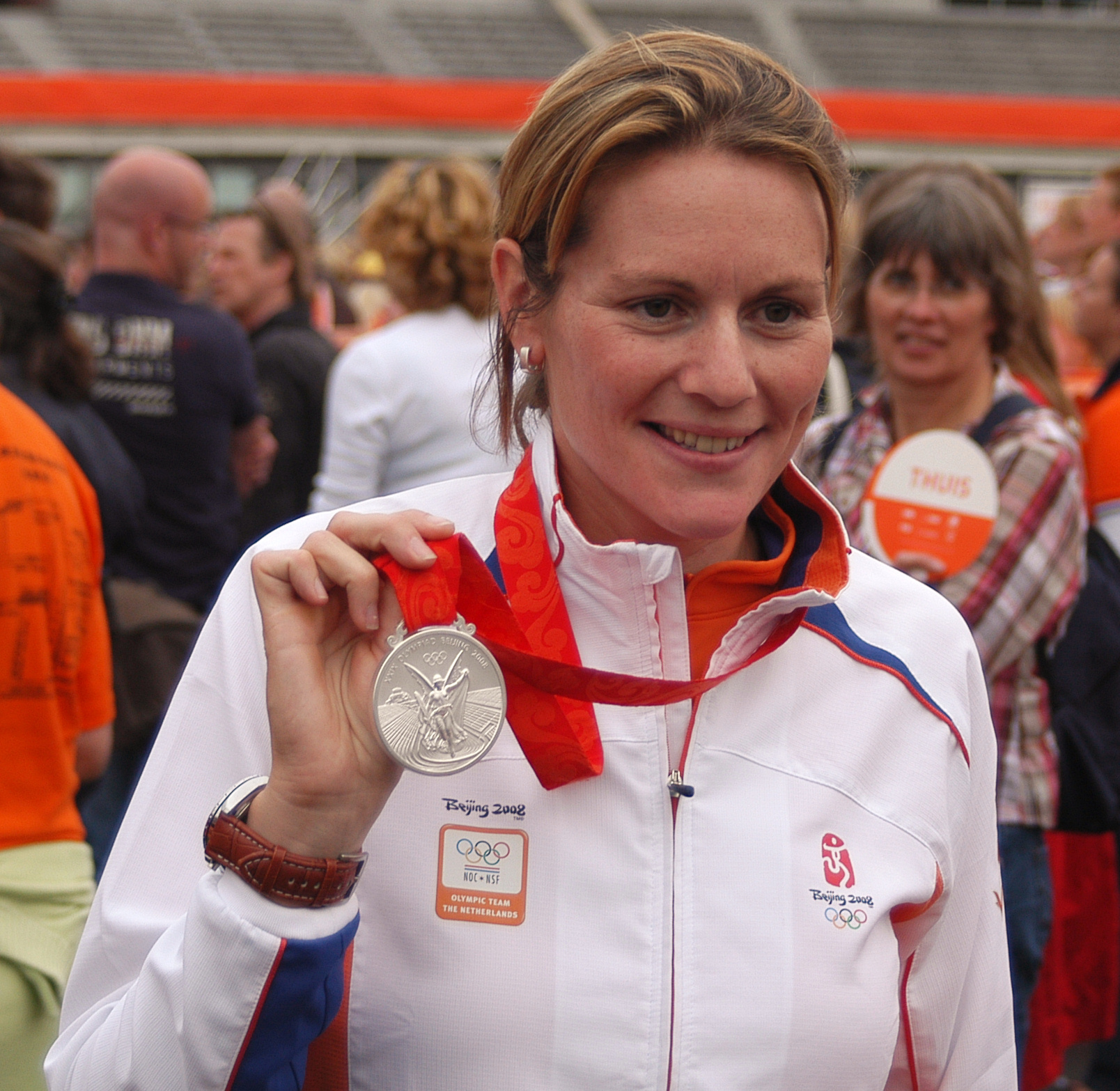
Femke Dekker from the Netherlands won a silver medal in the women's eights in rowing.

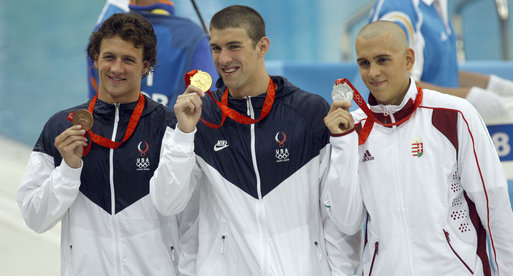
From left to right: Ryan Lochte (bronze), Michael Phelps (gold), both from USA, and László Cseh from Hungary (silver) show the medals they earned from the men's 400 metre individual medley.

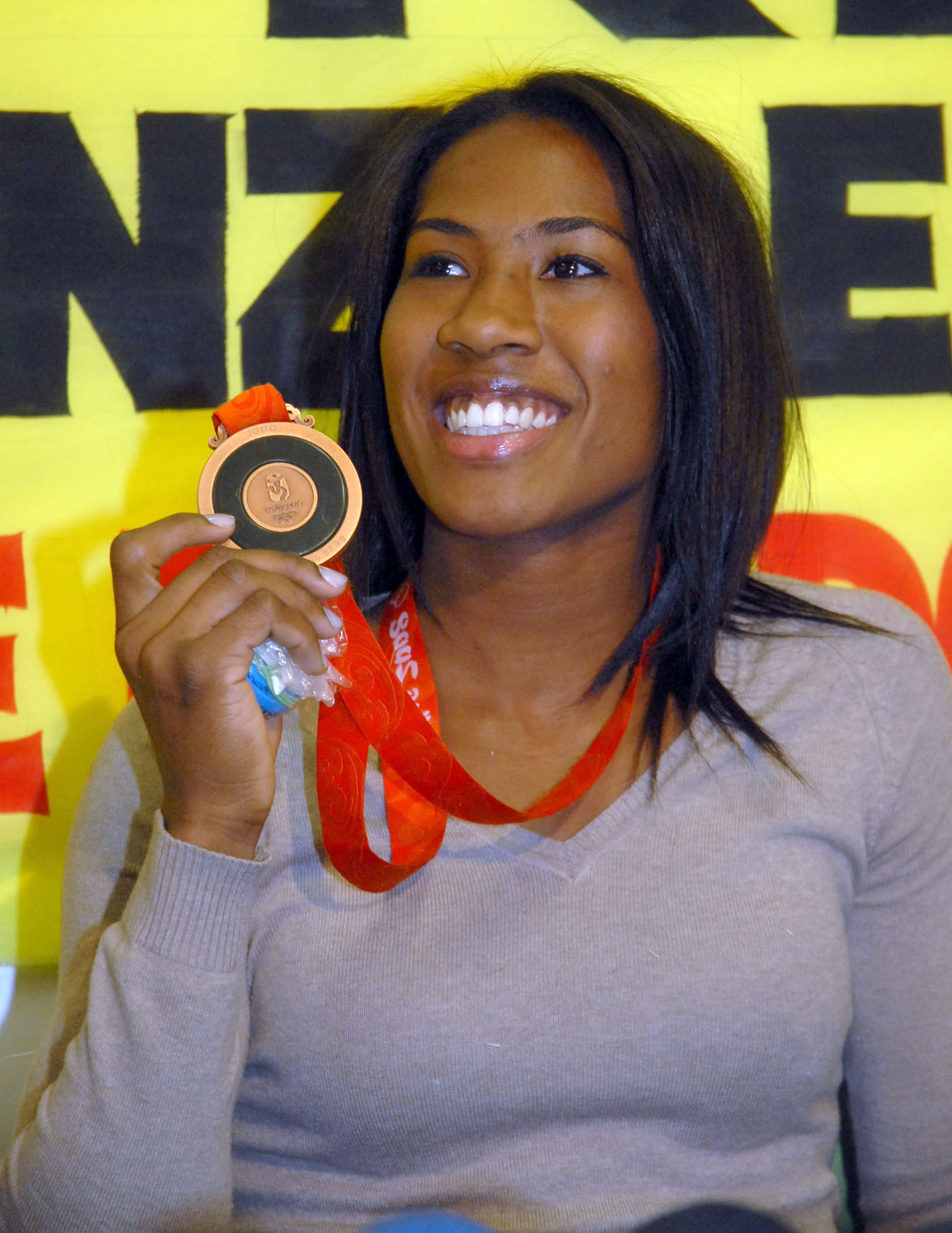
Ketleyn Quadros from Brazil won a bronze medal in the women's 57 kg judo.

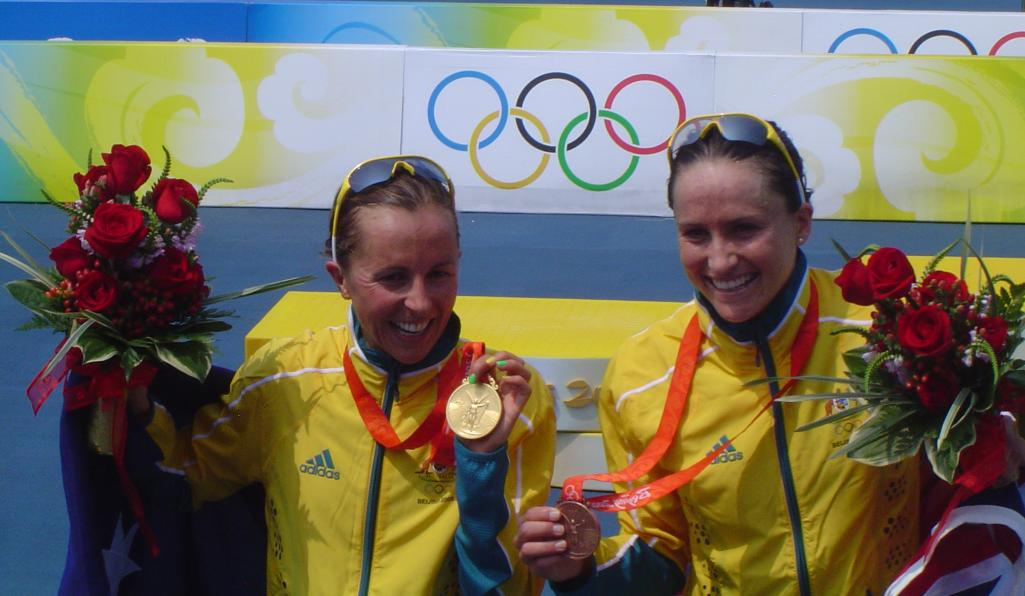
Emma Snowsill (left) and Emma Moffatt (right) from Australia show their gold and bronze medals after the women's triathlon.

Key

‡ Changes in medal standings (see below)

* Host nation (China)

2008 Summer Olympics medal table (Note: Figures in table reflect all official changes in medal standings.)
Rank	NOC	Gold	Silver	Bronze	Total
1	China*‡	48	22	30	100
2	United States‡	36	39	37	112
3	Russia‡	24	13	23	60
4	Great Britain‡	19	13	19	51
5	Germany‡	16	11	14	41
6	Australia	14	15	17	46
7	South Korea‡	13	11	8	32
8	Japan‡	9	8	8	25
9	Italy‡	8	9	10	27
10	France‡	7	16	20	43
11	Netherlands	7	5	4	16
12	Ukraine‡	7	4	11	22
13	Kenya‡	6	4	6	16
14	Spain‡	5	11	3	19
15	Jamaica‡	5	4	2	11
16	Poland‡	4	5	2	11
17	Ethiopia‡	4	2	1	7
18	Romania‡	4	1	4	9
19	Cuba‡	3	10	17	30
20	Canada‡	3	9	8	20
21	Hungary	3	5	2	10
22	Norway‡	3	5	1	9
23	Brazil‡	3	4	10	17
24	Belarus‡	3	4	7	14
25	Czech Republic‡	3	3	1	7
26	Slovakia‡	3	3	0	6
27	New Zealand‡	3	2	4	9
28	Georgia‡	3	2	2	7
29	Kazakhstan‡	2	3	4	9
30	Denmark	2	2	3	7
31	North Korea‡	2	2	2	6
31	Thailand‡	2	2	2	6
33	Mongolia	2	2	0	4
34	Switzerland‡	2	1	4	7
35	Argentina	2	0	4	6
36	Mexico	2	0	2	4
37	Belgium‡	2	0	0	2
38	Zimbabwe	1	3	0	4
39	Slovenia	1	2	2	5
40	Azerbaijan‡	1	1	4	6
40	Indonesia‡	1	1	4	6
42	Bulgaria	1	1	3	5
42	Turkey‡	1	1	3	5
44	Chinese Taipei‡	1	1	2	4
44	Finland	1	1	2	4
46	Latvia	1	1	1	3
47	Dominican Republic	1	1	0	2
47	Estonia	1	1	0	2
47	Portugal	1	1	0	2
47	Trinidad and Tobago‡	1	1	0	2
51	India	1	0	2	3
52	Iran	1	0	1	2
53	Cameroon	1	0	0	1
53	Panama	1	0	0	1
53	Tunisia	1	0	0	1
56	Sweden‡	0	4	1	5
57	Lithuania‡	0	3	2	5
57	Nigeria‡	0	3	2	5
59	Croatia	0	2	3	5
60	Colombia‡	0	2	1	3
60	Greece‡	0	2	1	3
62	Armenia‡	0	1	4	5
63	Uzbekistan‡	0	1	3	4
64	Austria	0	1	2	3
64	Ireland	0	1	2	3
64	Kyrgyzstan‡	0	1	2	3
64	Serbia	0	1	2	3
68	Algeria	0	1	1	2
68	Bahamas	0	1	1	2
68	Morocco	0	1	1	2
68	Tajikistan	0	1	1	2
72	Chile	0	1	0	1
72	Ecuador	0	1	0	1
72	Iceland	0	1	0	1
72	Malaysia	0	1	0	1
72	Samoa‡	0	1	0	1
72	Singapore	0	1	0	1
72	South Africa	0	1	0	1
72	Sudan	0	1	0	1
72	Vietnam	0	1	0	1
81	Egypt	0	0	2	2
82	Afghanistan	0	0	1	1
82	Israel	0	0	1	1
82	Mauritius	0	0	1	1
82	Moldova	0	0	1	1
82	Togo	0	0	1	1
82	Venezuela	0	0	1	1
Totals (87 entries)		302	303	353	958

== Changes in medal standings ==
Belarusian athletes Vadim Devyatovskiy and Ivan Tsikhan, who won silver and bronze respectively in the men's hammer throw, both tested positive for abnormal levels of testosterone. After attending a disciplinary hearing in September 2008, they were stripped of their medals on 11 December 2008. Krisztián Pars of Hungary was awarded the silver medal, and Koji Murofushi of Japan was awarded the bronze. However, both of the Belarusian athletes subsequently had their medals reinstated because the doping tests were not handled correctly.

List of official changes in medal standings
Ruling date	Event	Athlete (NOC)	1st place, gold medalist(s)	2nd place, silver medalist(s)	3rd place, bronze medalist(s)	Net change	Comment
Changes during the Games
15 August 2008	Shooting, Men's 10 metre air pistol	Kim Jong-su (PRK) DSQ			−1	−1	On 15 August 2008, the IOC announced that North Korean shooter Kim Jong-su had tested positive for the banned substance propranolol and he was stripped of his two medals. He had won a bronze medal in the 10 metre air pistol event and silver in the 50 metre pistol competition. After the disqualification, the bronze medal in the 10 metre air pistol competition went to Jason Turner of the United States, the silver medal in the 50 metre pistol event went to Tan Zongliang of China, and the bronze to Vladimir Isakov of Russia.
15 August 2008	Shooting, Men's 10 metre air pistol	Jason Turner (USA)			+1	+1	
15 August 2008	Shooting, Men's 50 metre pistol	Kim Jong-su (PRK) DSQ		−1		−1	
15 August 2008	Shooting, Men's 50 metre pistol	Tan Zongliang (CHN)		+1	−1	0	
15 August 2008	Shooting, Men's 50 metre pistol	Vladimir Isakov (RUS)			+1	+1	
16 August 2008	Wrestling, Men's Greco-Roman 84 kg	Ara Abrahamian (SWE) DSQ			−1	−1	Swedish wrestler Ara Abrahamian was originally awarded a bronze medal in the Greco-Roman 84 kg event. However, at the medal ceremony he walked off the podium and dropped his medal on the mat in protest against the judging in his event. On 16 August 2008, the IOC decided to strip Abrahamian of his medal because they felt it amounted to a political demonstration and was disrespectful to other athletes. As there was already one other bronze medalist in this event, Abrahamian's medal was not reallocated.
22 August 2008	Athletics, Women's heptathlon	Lyudmyla Blonska (UKR) DSQ		−1		−1	Ukrainian athlete Lyudmyla Blonska, who finished second in the women's heptathlon, tested positive for the steroid methyltestosterone. On 22 August 2008, the IOC officially stripped Blonska of her medal, and as a result, the silver medal went to Hyleas Fountain of the United States, and the bronze medal to Tatyana Chernova of Russia. Nine years later, on 24 April 2017, Chernova was disqualified and stripped of the bronze medal after a retest of her sample showed that she had used turinabol. The bronze medal was then re-allocated to Great Britain's Kelly Sotherton (see below).
22 August 2008	Athletics, Women's heptathlon	Hyleas Fountain (USA)		+1	−1	0	
22 August 2008	Athletics, Women's heptathlon	Tatyana Chernova (RUS)			+1	+1	
Changes after the Games
22 December 2008	Equestrian, Team jumping	Tony André Hansen (NOR) DSQ			−1	−1	Norwegian equestrian athlete Tony André Hansen's horse tested positive for the pain relieving medication capsaicin, a banned substance. Hansen, who had won a bronze medal in the team jumping event, was disqualified. In the team jumping system, the top three scores garnered by the four riders are counted. Hansen had the best score on his team, and it was removed from the total. Without Hansen's score, his team was below the bronze medal threshold, and bronze was awarded to the team from Switzerland on 22 December 2008.
22 December 2008	Equestrian, Team jumping	(SUI)			+1	+1	
18 November 2009	Athletics, men's 1500 metres race	Rashid Ramzi (BRN) DSQ	−1			−1	On 18 November 2009, the IOC announced that two medalists had been stripped of their medals. First, Rashid Ramzi of Bahrain had been stripped of the gold medal in the men's 1500 metres race. He had been the first athlete from Bahrain to win an Olympic gold medal. His frozen blood sample was retested and found to contain traces of Cera, a stamina-building blood-booster. Kenyan Asbel Kiprop was upgraded to gold, Nick Willis of New Zealand was given the silver and Mehdi Baala of France received the bronze. Italian cyclist Davide Rebellin had also tested positive for Cera and was stripped of the silver medal he earned in the men's individual road race. Fabian Cancellara of Switzerland later had his bronze medal upgraded to silver, and the bronze medal was awarded to Alexandr Kolobnev of Russia.
18 November 2009	Athletics, men's 1500 metres race	Asbel Kiprop (KEN)	+1	−1		0	
18 November 2009	Athletics, men's 1500 metres race	Nick Willis (NZL)		+1	−1	0	
18 November 2009	Athletics, men's 1500 metres race	Mehdi Baala (FRA)			+1	+1	
18 November 2009	Cycling, Men's individual road race	Davide Rebellin (ITA) DSQ		−1		−1	
18 November 2009	Cycling, Men's individual road race	Fabian Cancellara (SUI)		+1	−1	0	
18 November 2009	Cycling, Men's individual road race	Alexandr Kolobnev (RUS)			+1	+1	
20 August 2014	Athletics, Men's shot put	Andrei Mikhnevich (BLR) DSQ			−1	−1	In 2012, the International Association of Athletics Federations (IAAF) announced that retested doping samples of Belarusian shotputter Andrei Mikhnevich from the 2005 World Athletics Championships were found positive for three anabolic steroids: Clenbuterol, Metandienone and Oxandrolone. On 20 August 2014, the IOC disqualified Mikhnevich's results from the 2008 Summer Olympics in the men's shot put event and reallocated the bronze medal to Canadian athlete Dylan Armstrong.
20 August 2014	Athletics, Men's shot put	Dylan Armstrong (CAN)			+1	+1	In 2012, the International Association of Athletics Federations (IAAF) announced that retested doping samples of Belarusian shotputter Andrei Mikhnevich from the 2005 World Athletics Championships were found positive for three anabolic steroids: Clenbuterol, Metandienone and Oxandrolone. On 20 August 2014, the IOC disqualified Mikhnevich's results from the 2008 Summer Olympics in the men's shot put event and reallocated the bronze medal to Canadian athlete Dylan Armstrong.
List of official changes in medal standings (2016 wave of retesting)
22 July 2016	Weightlifting, Women's 48 kg	Sibel Özkan (TUR) DSQ		−1		−1	On 22 July 2016, Sibel Özkan of Turkey was disqualified due to an anti-doping rule violation and stripped of her silver medal in the women's 48 kg event. The IOC requested that the International Weightlifting Federation (IWF) modify the results of the weightlifting events, and the medals were reallocated accordingly.
22 July 2016	Weightlifting, Women's 48 kg	For reallocation of medals see 12 January 2017					On 22 July 2016, Sibel Özkan of Turkey was disqualified due to an anti-doping rule violation and stripped of her silver medal in the women's 48 kg event. The IOC requested that the International Weightlifting Federation (IWF) modify the results of the weightlifting events, and the medals were reallocated accordingly.
16 August 2016	Athletics, Women's 4 × 100 metres relay	Yuliya Chermoshanskaya (RUS) DSQ	−1			−1	On 16 August 2016, the Russian women's 4 × 100 metres relay team was disqualified for doping. The Russian team members were stripped of their gold Olympic medals, as Yuliya Chermoshanskaya had her samples reanalyzed and tested positive for two prohibited substances. The IOC requested that the IAAF modify the results, and the medals were redistributed accordingly.
16 August 2016	Athletics, Women's 4 × 100 metres relay	(BEL)	+1	−1		0	On 16 August 2016, the Russian women's 4 × 100 metres relay team was disqualified for doping. The Russian team members were stripped of their gold Olympic medals, as Yuliya Chermoshanskaya had her samples reanalyzed and tested positive for two prohibited substances. The IOC requested that the IAAF modify the results, and the medals were redistributed accordingly.
16 August 2016	Athletics, Women's 4 × 100 metres relay	(NGR)		+1	−1	0	On 16 August 2016, the Russian women's 4 × 100 metres relay team was disqualified for doping. The Russian team members were stripped of their gold Olympic medals, as Yuliya Chermoshanskaya had her samples reanalyzed and tested positive for two prohibited substances. The IOC requested that the IAAF modify the results, and the medals were redistributed accordingly.
16 August 2016	Athletics, Women's 4 × 100 metres relay	(BRA)			+1	+1	On 16 August 2016, the Russian women's 4 × 100 metres relay team was disqualified for doping. The Russian team members were stripped of their gold Olympic medals, as Yuliya Chermoshanskaya had her samples reanalyzed and tested positive for two prohibited substances. The IOC requested that the IAAF modify the results, and the medals were redistributed accordingly.
19 August 2016	Athletics, Women's 4 × 400 metres relay	Anastasiya Kapachinskaya (RUS) DSQ, Tatyana Firova (RUS) DSQ		−1		−1	On 19 August 2016, the Russian women's 4 × 400 metres relay team was disqualified for doping and stripped of their silver Olympic medals, when team member Anastasiya Kapachinskaya had her samples reanalyzed and tested positive for two prohibited substances. Another member of the Russian 4 × 400 metres relay team, Tatyana Firova, was separately disqualified on 31 August 2016. The Belarusian 4 × 400 metres relay team (4th place) was also disqualified due to a doping violation by Sviatlana Usovich. The IOC requested that the IAAF modify the results, and the medals were redistributed accordingly.
19 August 2016	Athletics, Women's 4 × 400 metres relay	(JAM)		+1	−1	0	
19 August 2016	Athletics, Women's 4 × 400 metres relay	(GBR)			+1	+1	
31 August 2016	Weightlifting, Men's 69 kg	Tigran Martirosyan (ARM) DSQ			−1	−1	On 31 August 2016, the IOC disqualified six sportspersons for failing doping tests at the 2008 Games. They included Russian weightlifting medalists Nadezhda Evstyukhina (bronze medal in the women's 75 kg event) and Marina Shainova (silver medal in the women's 58 kg event). Also disqualified were bronze medal weightlifter Tigran Martirosyan of Armenia (men's 69 kg event) and fellow weightlifters Alexandru Dudoglo of Moldova (ninth place in men's 69 kg event) and Intigam Zairov of Azerbaijan (ninth place in men's 85 kg event). The IOC requested that the IWF modify the results of the weightlifting events, and the medals were reallocated accordingly.
31 August 2016	Weightlifting, Men's 69 kg	Yordanis Borrero (CUB)			+1	+1	
31 August 2016	Weightlifting, Women's 75 kg	Nadezhda Evstyukhina (RUS) DSQ			−1	−1	
31 August 2016	Weightlifting, Women's 75 kg	For reallocation of medals see 12 January 2017					
31 August 2016	Weightlifting, Women's 58 kg	Marina Shainova (RUS) DSQ		−1		−1	
31 August 2016	Weightlifting, Women's 58 kg	O Jong-ae (PRK)		+1	−1	0	
31 August 2016	Weightlifting, Women's 58 kg	Wandee Kameaim (THA)			+1	+1	
1 September 2016	Athletics, Women's discus throw	Yarelys Barrios (CUB) DSQ		−1		−1	On 1 September 2016, the IOC disqualified a further two athletes. Cuban discus thrower Yarelys Barrios, who won a silver medal in the women's discus throw, was disqualified after testing positive for Acetazolamide and ordered to return her medal. Qatari sprinter Samuel Francis, who finished 16th in the men's 100 metres race, was also disqualified after testing positive for the banned substance stanozolol. The IOC requested that the IAAF modify the results, and the medals were redistributed accordingly.
1 September 2016	Athletics, Women's discus throw	Olena Antonova (UKR)		+1	−1	0	
1 September 2016	Athletics, Women's discus throw	Song Aimin (CHN)			+1	+1	
13 September 2016	Athletics, Women's javelin throw	Mariya Abakumova (RUS) DSQ		−1		−1	On 13 September 2016, four more Russian athletes were disqualified for doping offenses. Two of those were medalists from the 2008 Summer Olympics: silver medalist Mariya Abakumova in the women's javelin throw and Denis Alekseyev, who was in the Russian bronze medal team for the men's 4 × 400 m relay. Inga Abitova, who finished sixth in the 10,000 metres race, and cyclist Ekaterina Gnidenko also tested positive for a banned substance and were disqualified. The IOC requested that the IAAF modify the results; medals in the men's 4 × 400 m relay event were redistributed, and on 9 July 2017 Michael Bingham, Martyn Rooney, Andrew Steele and Robert Tobin received the bronze medals in London. In the women's javelin throw event, Christina Obergföll of Germany was advanced to silver, and the bronze medal was reallocated to Goldie Sayers of Great Britain.
13 September 2016	Athletics, Women's javelin throw	Christina Obergföll (GER)		+1	−1	0	
13 September 2016	Athletics, Women's javelin throw	Goldie Sayers (GBR)			+1	+1	
13 September 2016	Athletics, Men's 4 × 400 m relay	Denis Alekseyev (RUS) DSQ			−1	−1	
13 September 2016	Athletics, Men's 4 × 400 m relay	(GBR)			+1	+1	
6 October 2016	Athletics, Women's high jump	Anna Chicherova (RUS) DSQ			−1	−1	On 6 October 2016, the IOC disqualified Anna Chicherova of Russian for testing positive for performance-enhancing drugs. She had won a bronze medal in the women's high jump. Yelena Slesarenko of Russia (fourth place) and Vita Palamar of Ukraine (fifth place) were also disqualified. The IOC requested that the IAAF modify the results, and the medals were redistributed accordingly.
6 October 2016	Athletics, Women's high jump	Chaunté Howard (USA)			+1	+1	On 6 October 2016, the IOC disqualified Anna Chicherova of Russian for testing positive for performance-enhancing drugs. She had won a bronze medal in the women's high jump. Yelena Slesarenko of Russia (fourth place) and Vita Palamar of Ukraine (fifth place) were also disqualified. The IOC requested that the IAAF modify the results, and the medals were redistributed accordingly.
26 October 2016	Weightlifting, Men's 85 kg	Andrei Rybakou (BLR) DSQ		−1		−1	On 26 October 2016, the IOC disqualified nine more athletes for failing drugs tests at the 2008 games. Amongst them were six medalists: Andrei Rybakou and Nastassia Novikava, both from Belarus, Olha Korobka of Ukraine, Ekaterina Volkova of Russia, Soslan Tigiev of Uzbekistan, and Taimuraz Tigiyev of Kazakhstan. The IOC requested that United World Wrestling (UWW) modify the results of the wrestling events, and the medals were reallocated accordingly. The IOC requested that the IWF modify the results of the weightlifting events, and the medals were reallocated accordingly. The IOC also requested that the IAAF modify the results of the women's 3000 metres steeplechase event, and the medals were reallocated accordingly.
26 October 2016	Weightlifting, Men's 85 kg	Tigran Martirosyan (ARM)		+1	−1	0	
26 October 2016	Weightlifting, Men's 85 kg	Jadier Valladares (CUB)			+1	+1	
26 October 2016	Weightlifting, Women's 53 kg	Nastassia Novikava (BLR) DSQ			−1	−1	
26 October 2016	Weightlifting, Women's 53 kg	Raema Lisa Rumbewas (INA)			+1	+1	
26 October 2016	Weightlifting, Women's +75 kg	Olha Korobka (UKR) DSQ		−1		−1	
26 October 2016	Weightlifting, Women's +75 kg	For reallocation of medals see 17 November 2016					
26 October 2016	Athletics, Women's 3000 metres steeplechase	Yekaterina Volkova (RUS) DSQ			−1	−1	
26 October 2016	Athletics, Women's 3000 metres steeplechase	Tatyana Petrova Arkhipova (RUS)			+1	+1	
26 October 2016	Wrestling, Men's freestyle 74 kg	Soslan Tigiev (UZB) DSQ		−1		−1	
26 October 2016	Wrestling, Men's freestyle 74 kg	Murad Gaidarov (BLR)		+1	−1	0	
26 October 2016	Wrestling, Men's freestyle 74 kg	Gheorghiță Ștefan (ROU)			+1	+1	
26 October 2016	Wrestling, Men's freestyle 96 kg	Taimuraz Tigiyev (KAZ) DSQ		−1		−1	
26 October 2016	Wrestling, Men's freestyle 96 kg	Giorgi Gogshelidze (GEO)		+1	−1	0	
26 October 2016	Wrestling, Men's freestyle 96 kg	Michel Batista (CUB)			+1	+1	
17 November 2016	Athletics, Men's pole vault	Denys Yurchenko (UKR) DSQ			−1	−1	On 17 November 2016, the IOC disqualified sixteen more athletes for failing drugs tests at the 2008 games. Amongst them were ten medal winners: Khadzhimurat Akkaev, Khasan Baroev and Dmitry Lapikov from Russia, Mariya Grabovetskaya, Asset Mambetov and Irina Nekrassova from Kazakhstan, Nataliya Davydova and Denys Yurchenko, both from Ukraine, Hrysopiyi Devetzi of Greece, and Vitaliy Rahimov of Azerbaijan. The IOC requested that UWW modify the results of the wrestling events, and the medals were reallocated accordingly. The IOC requested that the IWF modify the results of the weightlifting events, and the medals were reallocated accordingly. The IOC also requested that the IAAF modify the results, and medals in the men's pole vault event were redistributed accordingly.
17 November 2016	Athletics, Men's pole vault	Derek Miles (USA)			+1	+1	
17 November 2016	Athletics, Women's triple jump	Hrysopiyi Devetzi (GRE) DSQ			−1	−1	
17 November 2016	Athletics, Women's triple jump	For reallocation of medals see 25 January 2017					
17 November 2016	Weightlifting, Men's 94 kg	Khadzhimurat Akkaev (RUS) DSQ			−1	−1	
17 November 2016	Weightlifting, Men's 94 kg	For reallocation of medals see 25 November 2016					
17 November 2016	Weightlifting, Women's 69 kg	Nataliya Davydova (UKR) DSQ			−1	−1	
17 November 2016	Weightlifting, Women's 69 kg	For reallocation of medals see 12 January 2017					
17 November 2016	Weightlifting, Women's +75 kg	Ele Opeloge (SAM)		+1		+1	
17 November 2016	Weightlifting, Women's +75 kg	Mariya Grabovetskaya (KAZ) DSQ			−1	−1	
17 November 2016	Weightlifting, Women's +75 kg	Mariam Usman (NGR)			+1	+1	
17 November 2016	Weightlifting, Men's 105 kg	Dmitry Lapikov (RUS) DSQ			−1	−1	
17 November 2016	Weightlifting, Men's 105 kg	Marcin Dołęga (POL)			+1	+1	
17 November 2016	Weightlifting, Women's 63 kg	Irina Nekrassova (KAZ) DSQ		−1		−1	
17 November 2016	Weightlifting, Women's 63 kg	Lu Ying-chi (TPE)		+1	−1	0	
17 November 2016	Weightlifting, Women's 63 kg	Christine Girard (CAN)			+1	+1	
17 November 2016	Wrestling, Men's Greco-Roman 60 kg	Vitaliy Rahimov (AZE) DSQ		−1		−1	
17 November 2016	Wrestling, Men's Greco-Roman 60 kg	Nurbakyt Tengizbayev (KAZ)		+1	−1	0	
17 November 2016	Wrestling, Men's Greco-Roman 60 kg	Sheng Jiang (CHN)			+1	+1	
17 November 2016	Wrestling, Men's Greco-Roman 96 kg	Asset Mambetov (KAZ) DSQ			−1	−1	
17 November 2016	Wrestling, Men's Greco-Roman 96 kg	Marek Švec (CZE)			+1	+1	
17 November 2016	Wrestling, Men's Greco-Roman 120 kg	Khasan Baroev (RUS) DSQ		−1		−1	
17 November 2016	Wrestling, Men's Greco-Roman 120 kg	Mindaugas Mizgaitis (LTU)		+1	−1	0	
17 November 2016	Wrestling, Men's Greco-Roman 120 kg	Yannick Szczepaniak (FRA)			+1	+1	
25 November 2016	Athletics, Women's hammer throw	Aksana Miankova (BLR) DSQ	−1			−1	On 25 November 2016, the IOC disqualified Aksana Miankova and Natallia Mikhnevich, both from Belarus, and Ilya Ilyin from Kazakhstan. The IOC requested that the IWF modify the results of the weightlifting events, and the medals were reallocated accordingly. The IOC also requested that the IAAF modify the results, and medals in the women's hammer throw event were redistributed accordingly.
25 November 2016	Athletics, Women's hammer throw	Yipsi Moreno (CUB)	+1	−1		0	On 25 November 2016, the IOC disqualified Aksana Miankova and Natallia Mikhnevich, both from Belarus, and Ilya Ilyin from Kazakhstan. The IOC requested that the IWF modify the results of the weightlifting events, and the medals were reallocated accordingly. The IOC also requested that the IAAF modify the results, and medals in the women's hammer throw event were redistributed accordingly.
25 November 2016	Athletics, Women's hammer throw	Zhang Wenxiu (CHN)		+1	−1	0	On 25 November 2016, the IOC disqualified Aksana Miankova and Natallia Mikhnevich, both from Belarus, and Ilya Ilyin from Kazakhstan. The IOC requested that the IWF modify the results of the weightlifting events, and the medals were reallocated accordingly. The IOC also requested that the IAAF modify the results, and medals in the women's hammer throw event were redistributed accordingly.
25 November 2016	Athletics, Women's hammer throw	Manuela Montebrun (FRA)			+1	+1	On 25 November 2016, the IOC disqualified Aksana Miankova and Natallia Mikhnevich, both from Belarus, and Ilya Ilyin from Kazakhstan. The IOC requested that the IWF modify the results of the weightlifting events, and the medals were reallocated accordingly. The IOC also requested that the IAAF modify the results, and medals in the women's hammer throw event were redistributed accordingly.
25 November 2016	Athletics, Women's shot put	Natallia Mikhnevich (BLR) DSQ		−1		−1	On 25 November 2016, the IOC disqualified Aksana Miankova and Natallia Mikhnevich, both from Belarus, and Ilya Ilyin from Kazakhstan. The IOC requested that the IWF modify the results of the weightlifting events, and the medals were reallocated accordingly. The IOC also requested that the IAAF modify the results, and medals in the women's hammer throw event were redistributed accordingly.
25 November 2016	Athletics, Women's shot put	For reallocation of medals see 12 January 2017					On 25 November 2016, the IOC disqualified Aksana Miankova and Natallia Mikhnevich, both from Belarus, and Ilya Ilyin from Kazakhstan. The IOC requested that the IWF modify the results of the weightlifting events, and the medals were reallocated accordingly. The IOC also requested that the IAAF modify the results, and medals in the women's hammer throw event were redistributed accordingly.
25 November 2016	Weightlifting, Men's 94 kg	Ilya Ilyin (KAZ) DSQ	−1			−1	On 25 November 2016, the IOC disqualified Aksana Miankova and Natallia Mikhnevich, both from Belarus, and Ilya Ilyin from Kazakhstan. The IOC requested that the IWF modify the results of the weightlifting events, and the medals were reallocated accordingly. The IOC also requested that the IAAF modify the results, and medals in the women's hammer throw event were redistributed accordingly.
25 November 2016	Weightlifting, Men's 94 kg	Szymon Kołecki (POL)	+1	−1		0	On 25 November 2016, the IOC disqualified Aksana Miankova and Natallia Mikhnevich, both from Belarus, and Ilya Ilyin from Kazakhstan. The IOC requested that the IWF modify the results of the weightlifting events, and the medals were reallocated accordingly. The IOC also requested that the IAAF modify the results, and medals in the women's hammer throw event were redistributed accordingly.
25 November 2016	Weightlifting, Men's 94 kg	Arsen Kasabiev (GEO)		+1		+1	On 25 November 2016, the IOC disqualified Aksana Miankova and Natallia Mikhnevich, both from Belarus, and Ilya Ilyin from Kazakhstan. The IOC requested that the IWF modify the results of the weightlifting events, and the medals were reallocated accordingly. The IOC also requested that the IAAF modify the results, and medals in the women's hammer throw event were redistributed accordingly.
25 November 2016	Weightlifting, Men's 94 kg	Yoandry Hernández (CUB)			+1	+1	On 25 November 2016, the IOC disqualified Aksana Miankova and Natallia Mikhnevich, both from Belarus, and Ilya Ilyin from Kazakhstan. The IOC requested that the IWF modify the results of the weightlifting events, and the medals were reallocated accordingly. The IOC also requested that the IAAF modify the results, and medals in the women's hammer throw event were redistributed accordingly.
12 January 2017	Weightlifting, Women's 48 kg	Chen Xiexia (CHN) DSQ	−1			−1	On 12 January 2017, the IOC disqualified Chen Xiexia, Liu Chunhong and Cao Lei, all from China, and Nadzeya Astapchuk from Belarus. The IOC requested that the IWF modify the results of the weightlifting events, and the medals were reallocated accordingly. The IOC also requested that the IAAF modify the results, and medals in the women's shot put event were redistributed accordingly.
12 January 2017	Weightlifting, Women's 48 kg	Chen Wei-ling (TPE)	+1		−1	0	On 12 January 2017, the IOC disqualified Chen Xiexia, Liu Chunhong and Cao Lei, all from China, and Nadzeya Astapchuk from Belarus. The IOC requested that the IWF modify the results of the weightlifting events, and the medals were reallocated accordingly. The IOC also requested that the IAAF modify the results, and medals in the women's shot put event were redistributed accordingly.
12 January 2017	Weightlifting, Women's 48 kg	Im Jyoung-hwa (KOR)		+1		+1	On 12 January 2017, the IOC disqualified Chen Xiexia, Liu Chunhong and Cao Lei, all from China, and Nadzeya Astapchuk from Belarus. The IOC requested that the IWF modify the results of the weightlifting events, and the medals were reallocated accordingly. The IOC also requested that the IAAF modify the results, and medals in the women's shot put event were redistributed accordingly.
12 January 2017	Weightlifting, Women's 48 kg	Pensiri Laosirikul (THA)			+1	+1	On 12 January 2017, the IOC disqualified Chen Xiexia, Liu Chunhong and Cao Lei, all from China, and Nadzeya Astapchuk from Belarus. The IOC requested that the IWF modify the results of the weightlifting events, and the medals were reallocated accordingly. The IOC also requested that the IAAF modify the results, and medals in the women's shot put event were redistributed accordingly.
12 January 2017	Weightlifting, Women's 69 kg	Liu Chunhong (CHN) DSQ	−1			−1	On 12 January 2017, the IOC disqualified Chen Xiexia, Liu Chunhong and Cao Lei, all from China, and Nadzeya Astapchuk from Belarus. The IOC requested that the IWF modify the results of the weightlifting events, and the medals were reallocated accordingly. The IOC also requested that the IAAF modify the results, and medals in the women's shot put event were redistributed accordingly.
12 January 2017	Weightlifting, Women's 69 kg	Oxana Slivenko (RUS)	+1	−1		0	On 12 January 2017, the IOC disqualified Chen Xiexia, Liu Chunhong and Cao Lei, all from China, and Nadzeya Astapchuk from Belarus. The IOC requested that the IWF modify the results of the weightlifting events, and the medals were reallocated accordingly. The IOC also requested that the IAAF modify the results, and medals in the women's shot put event were redistributed accordingly.
12 January 2017	Weightlifting, Women's 69 kg	Leydi Solís (COL)		+1		+1	On 12 January 2017, the IOC disqualified Chen Xiexia, Liu Chunhong and Cao Lei, all from China, and Nadzeya Astapchuk from Belarus. The IOC requested that the IWF modify the results of the weightlifting events, and the medals were reallocated accordingly. The IOC also requested that the IAAF modify the results, and medals in the women's shot put event were redistributed accordingly.
12 January 2017	Weightlifting, Women's 69 kg	Abeer Abdelrahman (EGY)			+1	+1	On 12 January 2017, the IOC disqualified Chen Xiexia, Liu Chunhong and Cao Lei, all from China, and Nadzeya Astapchuk from Belarus. The IOC requested that the IWF modify the results of the weightlifting events, and the medals were reallocated accordingly. The IOC also requested that the IAAF modify the results, and medals in the women's shot put event were redistributed accordingly.
12 January 2017	Weightlifting, Women's 75 kg	Cao Lei (CHN) DSQ	−1			−1	On 12 January 2017, the IOC disqualified Chen Xiexia, Liu Chunhong and Cao Lei, all from China, and Nadzeya Astapchuk from Belarus. The IOC requested that the IWF modify the results of the weightlifting events, and the medals were reallocated accordingly. The IOC also requested that the IAAF modify the results, and medals in the women's shot put event were redistributed accordingly.
12 January 2017	Weightlifting, Women's 75 kg	Alla Vazhenina (KAZ)	+1	−1		0	On 12 January 2017, the IOC disqualified Chen Xiexia, Liu Chunhong and Cao Lei, all from China, and Nadzeya Astapchuk from Belarus. The IOC requested that the IWF modify the results of the weightlifting events, and the medals were reallocated accordingly. The IOC also requested that the IAAF modify the results, and medals in the women's shot put event were redistributed accordingly.
12 January 2017	Weightlifting, Women's 75 kg	Lydia Valentín (ESP)		+1		+1	On 12 January 2017, the IOC disqualified Chen Xiexia, Liu Chunhong and Cao Lei, all from China, and Nadzeya Astapchuk from Belarus. The IOC requested that the IWF modify the results of the weightlifting events, and the medals were reallocated accordingly. The IOC also requested that the IAAF modify the results, and medals in the women's shot put event were redistributed accordingly.
12 January 2017	Weightlifting, Women's 75 kg	Damaris Aguirre (MEX)			+1	+1	On 12 January 2017, the IOC disqualified Chen Xiexia, Liu Chunhong and Cao Lei, all from China, and Nadzeya Astapchuk from Belarus. The IOC requested that the IWF modify the results of the weightlifting events, and the medals were reallocated accordingly. The IOC also requested that the IAAF modify the results, and medals in the women's shot put event were redistributed accordingly.
12 January 2017	Athletics, Women's shot put	Nadzeya Astapchuk (BLR) DSQ			−1	−1	On 12 January 2017, the IOC disqualified Chen Xiexia, Liu Chunhong and Cao Lei, all from China, and Nadzeya Astapchuk from Belarus. The IOC requested that the IWF modify the results of the weightlifting events, and the medals were reallocated accordingly. The IOC also requested that the IAAF modify the results, and medals in the women's shot put event were redistributed accordingly.
12 January 2017	Athletics, Women's shot put	Misleydis González (CUB)		+1		+1	On 12 January 2017, the IOC disqualified Chen Xiexia, Liu Chunhong and Cao Lei, all from China, and Nadzeya Astapchuk from Belarus. The IOC requested that the IWF modify the results of the weightlifting events, and the medals were reallocated accordingly. The IOC also requested that the IAAF modify the results, and medals in the women's shot put event were redistributed accordingly.
12 January 2017	Athletics, Women's shot put	Gong Lijiao (CHN)			+1	+1	On 12 January 2017, the IOC disqualified Chen Xiexia, Liu Chunhong and Cao Lei, all from China, and Nadzeya Astapchuk from Belarus. The IOC requested that the IWF modify the results of the weightlifting events, and the medals were reallocated accordingly. The IOC also requested that the IAAF modify the results, and medals in the women's shot put event were redistributed accordingly.
25 January 2017	Athletics, Men's 4 × 100 metres relay	Nesta Carter (JAM) DSQ	−1			−1	On 25 January 2017, the Jamaican team were stripped of the gold medal place in the men's 4 × 100 m relay due to Nesta Carter testing positive for the prohibited substance methylhexaneamine. The IOC requested that the IAAF modify the results, and, after Court of Arbitration for Sport (CAS) dismisses the appeal of Jamaican sprinter, the medals were redistributed accordingly. Trinidad and Tobago team was advanced to gold, Japan to silver, and Brazil to bronze. Tatyana Lebedeva of Russia lost two silver medals in the women's long jump and triple jump events due to the use of the banned substance turinabol. The IOC requested that the IAAF modify the results, and, after the CAS dismissed the appeal of Tatyana Lebedeva, the medals were redistributed accordingly. In the women's long jump event, Blessing Okagbare of Nigeria was advanced to silver, and Chelsea Hammond of Jamaica was advanced to bronze. In the women's triple jump event, Olga Rypakova of Kazakhstan was advanced to silver, and Yargelis Savigne of Cuba was advanced to bronze.
25 January 2017	Athletics, Men's 4 × 100 metres relay	(TTO)	+1	−1		0	
25 January 2017	Athletics, Men's 4 × 100 metres relay	(JPN)		+1	−1	0	
25 January 2017	Athletics, Men's 4 × 100 metres relay	(BRA)			+1	+1	
25 January 2017	Athletics, Women's long jump	Tatyana Lebedeva (RUS) DSQ		−1		−1	
25 January 2017	Athletics, Women's long jump	Blessing Okagbare (NGR)		+1	−1	0	
25 January 2017	Athletics, Women's long jump	Chelsea Hammond (JAM)			+1	+1	
25 January 2017	Athletics, Women's triple jump	Tatyana Lebedeva (RUS) DSQ		−1		−1	
25 January 2017	Athletics, Women's triple jump	Olga Rypakova (KAZ)		+1		+1	
25 January 2017	Athletics, Women's triple jump	Yargelis Savigne (CUB)			+1	+1	
1 March 2017	Modern pentathlon, Women's modern pentathlon	Victoria Tereshchuk (UKR) DSQ			−1	−1	On 1 March 2017, the IOC disqualified the Ukrainian athlete Victoria Tereshchuk from the bronze medal position of the women's modern pentathlon after she tested positive for the banned substance turinabol. She was stripped of the bronze medal in the women's modern pentathlon, which was reallocated to Anastasiya Prokopenko of Belarus.
1 March 2017	Modern pentathlon, Women's modern pentathlon	Anastasiya Prokopenko (BLR)			+1	+1	On 1 March 2017, the IOC disqualified the Ukrainian athlete Victoria Tereshchuk from the bronze medal position of the women's modern pentathlon after she tested positive for the banned substance turinabol. She was stripped of the bronze medal in the women's modern pentathlon, which was reallocated to Anastasiya Prokopenko of Belarus.
29 March 2017	Athletics, Women's 5000 metres	Elvan Abeylegesse (TUR) DSQ		−1		−1	On 29 March 2017, Elvan Abeylegesse was stripped of her two silver medals in the women's 5000 metres and 10,000 metres, due to doping offences. The IOC requested that the IAAF modify the results of the events, and the medals were reallocated accordingly.
29 March 2017	Athletics, Women's 5000 metres	Meseret Defar (ETH)		+1	−1	0	On 29 March 2017, Elvan Abeylegesse was stripped of her two silver medals in the women's 5000 metres and 10,000 metres, due to doping offences. The IOC requested that the IAAF modify the results of the events, and the medals were reallocated accordingly.
29 March 2017	Athletics, Women's 5000 metres	Sylvia Jebiwot Kibet (KEN)			+1	+1	On 29 March 2017, Elvan Abeylegesse was stripped of her two silver medals in the women's 5000 metres and 10,000 metres, due to doping offences. The IOC requested that the IAAF modify the results of the events, and the medals were reallocated accordingly.
29 March 2017	Athletics, Women's 10,000 metres	Elvan Abeylegesse (TUR) DSQ		−1		−1	On 29 March 2017, Elvan Abeylegesse was stripped of her two silver medals in the women's 5000 metres and 10,000 metres, due to doping offences. The IOC requested that the IAAF modify the results of the events, and the medals were reallocated accordingly.
29 March 2017	Athletics, Women's 10,000 metres	Shalane Flanagan (USA)		+1	−1	0	On 29 March 2017, Elvan Abeylegesse was stripped of her two silver medals in the women's 5000 metres and 10,000 metres, due to doping offences. The IOC requested that the IAAF modify the results of the events, and the medals were reallocated accordingly.
29 March 2017	Athletics, Women's 10,000 metres	Linet Masai (KEN)			+1	+1	On 29 March 2017, Elvan Abeylegesse was stripped of her two silver medals in the women's 5000 metres and 10,000 metres, due to doping offences. The IOC requested that the IAAF modify the results of the events, and the medals were reallocated accordingly.
5 April 2017	Wrestling, Men's freestyle 120 kg	Artur Taymazov (UZB) DSQ	−1			−1	On 5 April 2017, the IOC disqualified the Uzbek wrestler Artur Taymazov, who won gold in the men's freestyle 120 kg event, due to use of the banned substances turinabol and stanozolol. Ukrainian wrestler Vasyl Fedoryshyn was disqualified and stripped of his silver medal in the men's freestyle 60 kg event due to use of turinabol. The IOC requested that UWW modify the results of the wrestling events, and the medals were reallocated accordingly.
5 April 2017	Wrestling, Men's freestyle 120 kg	Bakhtiyar Akhmedov (RUS)	+1	−1		0	On 5 April 2017, the IOC disqualified the Uzbek wrestler Artur Taymazov, who won gold in the men's freestyle 120 kg event, due to use of the banned substances turinabol and stanozolol. Ukrainian wrestler Vasyl Fedoryshyn was disqualified and stripped of his silver medal in the men's freestyle 60 kg event due to use of turinabol. The IOC requested that UWW modify the results of the wrestling events, and the medals were reallocated accordingly.
5 April 2017	Wrestling, Men's freestyle 120 kg	David Musulbes (SVK)		+1	−1	0	On 5 April 2017, the IOC disqualified the Uzbek wrestler Artur Taymazov, who won gold in the men's freestyle 120 kg event, due to use of the banned substances turinabol and stanozolol. Ukrainian wrestler Vasyl Fedoryshyn was disqualified and stripped of his silver medal in the men's freestyle 60 kg event due to use of turinabol. The IOC requested that UWW modify the results of the wrestling events, and the medals were reallocated accordingly.
5 April 2017	Wrestling, Men's freestyle 120 kg	Disney Rodríguez (CUB)			+1	+1	On 5 April 2017, the IOC disqualified the Uzbek wrestler Artur Taymazov, who won gold in the men's freestyle 120 kg event, due to use of the banned substances turinabol and stanozolol. Ukrainian wrestler Vasyl Fedoryshyn was disqualified and stripped of his silver medal in the men's freestyle 60 kg event due to use of turinabol. The IOC requested that UWW modify the results of the wrestling events, and the medals were reallocated accordingly.
5 April 2017	Wrestling, Men's freestyle 60 kg	Vasyl Fedoryshyn (UKR) DSQ		−1		−1	On 5 April 2017, the IOC disqualified the Uzbek wrestler Artur Taymazov, who won gold in the men's freestyle 120 kg event, due to use of the banned substances turinabol and stanozolol. Ukrainian wrestler Vasyl Fedoryshyn was disqualified and stripped of his silver medal in the men's freestyle 60 kg event due to use of turinabol. The IOC requested that UWW modify the results of the wrestling events, and the medals were reallocated accordingly.
5 April 2017	Wrestling, Men's freestyle 60 kg	Kenichi Yumoto (JPN)		+1	−1	0	On 5 April 2017, the IOC disqualified the Uzbek wrestler Artur Taymazov, who won gold in the men's freestyle 120 kg event, due to use of the banned substances turinabol and stanozolol. Ukrainian wrestler Vasyl Fedoryshyn was disqualified and stripped of his silver medal in the men's freestyle 60 kg event due to use of turinabol. The IOC requested that UWW modify the results of the wrestling events, and the medals were reallocated accordingly.
5 April 2017	Wrestling, Men's freestyle 60 kg	Bazar Bazarguruev (KGZ)			+1	+1	On 5 April 2017, the IOC disqualified the Uzbek wrestler Artur Taymazov, who won gold in the men's freestyle 120 kg event, due to use of the banned substances turinabol and stanozolol. Ukrainian wrestler Vasyl Fedoryshyn was disqualified and stripped of his silver medal in the men's freestyle 60 kg event due to use of turinabol. The IOC requested that UWW modify the results of the wrestling events, and the medals were reallocated accordingly.
24 April 2017	Athletics, Women's heptathlon	Tatyana Chernova (RUS) DSQ			−1	−1	On 24 April 2017, Tatyana Chernova of Russia was disqualified and stripped of the bronze medal in the women's heptathlon due to the use of the banned substance turinabol. The bronze medal was reallocated to Kelly Sotherton of Great Britain.
24 April 2017	Athletics, Women's heptathlon	Kelly Sotherton (GBR)			+1	+1	On 24 April 2017, Tatyana Chernova of Russia was disqualified and stripped of the bronze medal in the women's heptathlon due to the use of the banned substance turinabol. The bronze medal was reallocated to Kelly Sotherton of Great Britain.

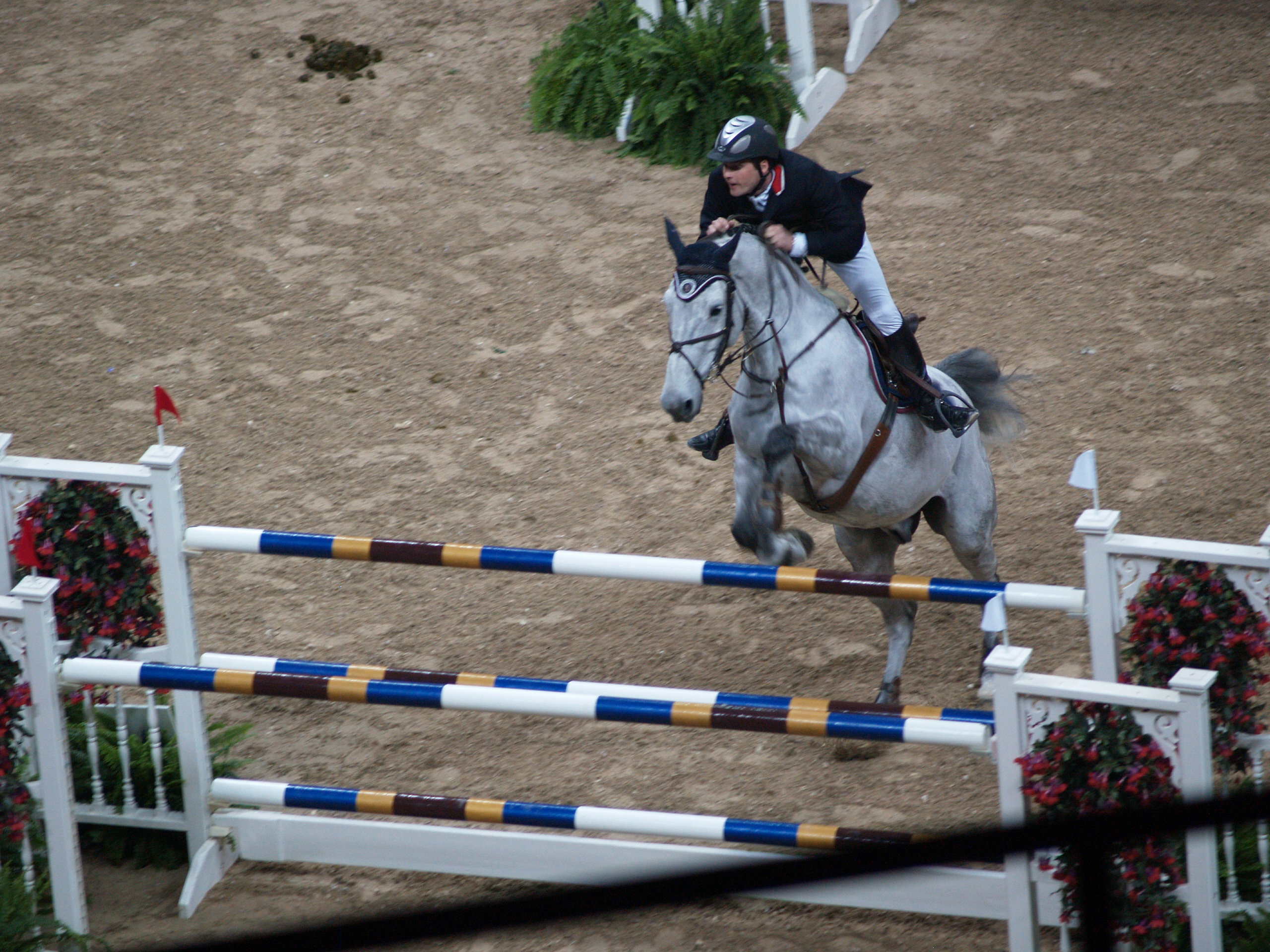
Norwegian show jumper Tony André Hansen was stripped of his bronze medal when his horse tested positive for a banned substance

List of official changes by country
NOC	Gold	Silver	Bronze	Net Change
Russia	+1	−8	−3	−10
Ukraine	0	−2	−4	−6
Belarus	−1	−1	−3	−5
Kazakhstan	−1	−1	−3	−5
Turkey	0	−3	0	−3
Uzbekistan	−1	−1	0	−2
North Korea	0	0	−2	−2
Bahrain	−1	0	0	−1
Azerbaijan	0	−1	0	−1
Italy	0	−1	0	−1
Armenia	0	+1	−2	−1
Greece	0	0	−1	−1
Norway	0	0	−1	−1
Sweden	0	0	−1	−1
China	−3	+2	+1	0
Jamaica	−1	+1	0	0
Belgium	+1	−1	0	0
Trinidad and Tobago	+1	−1	0	0
Chinese Taipei	+1	+1	−2	0
Japan	0	+2	−2	0
Germany	0	+1	−1	0
Ethiopia	0	+1	−1	0
Lithuania	0	+1	−1	0
New Zealand	0	+1	−1	0
Slovakia	0	+1	−1	0
Poland	+1	−1	+1	+1
Colombia	0	+1	0	+1
Samoa	0	+1	0	+1
South Korea	0	+1	0	+1
Spain	0	+1	0	+1
Switzerland	0	+1	0	+1
Georgia	0	+2	−1	+1
Nigeria	0	+2	−1	+1
Czech Republic	0	0	+1	+1
Egypt	0	0	+1	+1
Indonesia	0	0	+1	+1
Kyrgyzstan	0	0	+1	+1
Mexico	0	0	+1	+1
Romania	0	0	+1	+1
Brazil	0	0	+2	+2
Canada	0	0	+2	+2
Thailand	0	0	+2	+2
Kenya	+1	−1	+2	+2
France	0	0	+3	+3
United States	0	+2	+1	+3
Great Britain	0	0	+4	+4
Cuba	+1	−1	+6	+6

List of stripped medals

List of stripped medals by country
NOC	Gold	Silver	Bronze	Change
Russia	−1	−6	−7	−14
Belarus	−1	−2	−3	−6
Ukraine	0	−3	−3	−6
Kazakhstan	−1	−2	−2	−5
China	−3	0	0	−3
Turkey	0	−3	0	−3
Uzbekistan	−1	−1	0	−2
North Korea	0	−1	−1	−2
Bahrain	−1	0	0	−1
Jamaica	−1	0	0	−1
Azerbaijan	0	−1	0	−1
Cuba	0	−1	0	−1
Italy	0	−1	0	−1
Armenia	0	0	−1	−1
Greece	0	0	−1	−1
Norway	0	0	−1	−1
Sweden	0	0	−1	−1

== See also ==
- All-time Olympic Games medal table
- 2008 Summer Paralympics medal table
