= 2005 World Weightlifting Championships – Women's +75 kg =

The 2005 World Weightlifting Championships were held in Doha, Qatar from 9 November to 17 November. The women's +75 kilograms division was staged on 15 November 2005.

== Schedule ==
| Date | Time | Event |
|---|---|---|
| 15 November 2005 | 13:00 | Group B |
| 15 November 2005 | 17:30 | Group A |

== Medalists ==
| Event | Gold | | Silver | | Bronze | |
|---|---|---|---|---|---|---|
| Snatch | Mu Shuangshuang (CHN) | 130 kg | Jang Mi-ran (KOR) | 128 kg | Olha Korobka (UKR) | 127 kg |
| Clean & Jerk | Jang Mi-ran (KOR) | 172 kg | Mu Shuangshuang (CHN) | 170 kg | Cheryl Haworth (USA) | 161 kg |
| Total | Jang Mi-ran (KOR) | 300 kg | Mu Shuangshuang (CHN) | 300 kg | Cheryl Haworth (USA) | 287 kg |

== Records ==
Prior to this competition, the existing world records were as follows.

| World record | Snatch | Ding Meiyuan (CHN) | 137 kg | Vancouver, Canada | 21 November 2003 |
| World record | Clean & Jerk | Tang Gonghong (CHN) | 182 kg | Athens, Greece | 21 August 2004 |
| World record | Total | Tang Gonghong (CHN) | 305 kg | Athens, Greece | 21 August 2004 |

== Results ==
| Rank | Athlete | Group | Body weight | Snatch (kg) | | | | Clean & Jerk (kg) | | | | Total |
| Rank | Athlete | Group | Body weight | 1 | 2 | 3 | Rank | 1 | 2 | 3 | Rank | Total |
|---|---|---|---|---|---|---|---|---|---|---|---|---|
| 1st place, gold medalist(s) | Jang Mi-ran (KOR) | A | 115.12 | 125 | 128 | ~~130~~ | 2nd place, silver medalist(s) | 162 | 172 | ~~178~~ | 1st place, gold medalist(s) | 300 |
| 2nd place, silver medalist(s) | Mu Shuangshuang (CHN) | A | 131.77 | ~~125~~ | 125 | 130 | 1st place, gold medalist(s) | 165 | 170 | ~~174~~ | 2nd place, silver medalist(s) | 300 |
| 3rd place, bronze medalist(s) | Cheryl Haworth (USA) | A | 142.63 | 119 | 123 | 126 | 4 | 155 | 159 | 161 | 3rd place, bronze medalist(s) | 287 |
| 4 | Olha Korobka (UKR) | A | 162.51 | 121 | 125 | 127 | 3rd place, bronze medalist(s) | 155 | 158 | 160 | 4 | 287 |
| 5 | Agata Wróbel (POL) | A | 118.05 | 115 | 120 | ~~123~~ | 6 | ~~155~~ | ~~155~~ | 155 | 5 | 275 |
| 6 | Mariya Grabovetskaya (KAZ) | A | 95.95 | ~~110~~ | ~~110~~ | 115 | 8 | 135 | 140 | 146 | 6 | 261 |
| 7 | Yuliya Dovhal (UKR) | A | 91.28 | ~~115~~ | 115 | 120 | 5 | 135 | ~~140~~ | ~~140~~ | 9 | 255 |
| 8 | Theano Katsidi (GRE) | B | 101.10 | 100 | 104 | 108 | 11 | 130 | 136 | ~~139~~ | 7 | 244 |
| 9 | Magdalena Ufnal (POL) | B | 132.36 | 102 | 106 | 109 | 10 | 130 | 135 | ~~138~~ | 10 | 244 |
| 10 | Imen Hasnaoui (TUN) | A | 101.32 | 110 | ~~114~~ | ~~114~~ | 9 | 132 | ~~138~~ | ~~138~~ | 11 | 242 |
| 11 | Alexandra Aborneva (KAZ) | B | 84.52 | 100 | ~~105~~ | ~~106~~ | 12 | 130 | 135 | ~~140~~ | 8 | 235 |
| 12 | Fumiko Jonai (JPN) | B | 107.05 | 87 | ~~91~~ | ~~91~~ | 14 | 120 | 125 | ~~130~~ | 12 | 212 |
| 13 | Judith Ketchanke (CMR) | B | 87.53 | 80 | 85 | ~~90~~ | 15 | 115 | 120 | ~~122~~ | 14 | 205 |
| 14 | Kamila Białkowska (NED) | B | 88.40 | 90 | 95 | ~~97~~ | 13 | ~~110~~ | 110 | ~~114~~ | 15 | 205 |
| 15 | Sioe Haioti (NIU) | B | 101.18 | ~~84~~ | 84 | ~~88~~ | 17 | 116 | 121 | ~~126~~ | 13 | 205 |
| 16 | Mami Shimamoto (JPN) | B | 99.71 | ~~80~~ | 80 | 85 | 16 | 100 | 105 | 110 | 16 | 195 |
| — | Vasiliki Kasapi (GRE) | A | 116.10 | 110 | 115 | 117 | 7 | ~~135~~ | ~~135~~ | ~~135~~ | — | — |
