= 2006 World Weightlifting Championships – Women's +75 kg =

The 2006 World Weightlifting Championships were held in Santo Domingo, Dominican Republic from 30 September to 7 October. The women's +75 kilograms division was staged on 6 and 7 October 2006.

== Schedule ==
Date	Time	Event
6 October 2006	08:00	Group C
6 October 2006	12:00	Group B
7 October 2006	10:00	Group A

== Medalists ==
Event	Gold		Silver		Bronze	
Snatch	Mu Shuangshuang (CHN)	136 kg	Jang Mi-ran (KOR)	135 kg	Olha Korobka (UKR)	127 kg
Clean & Jerk	Jang Mi-ran (KOR)	179 kg	Mu Shuangshuang (CHN)	178 kg	Olha Korobka (UKR)	157 kg
Total	Jang Mi-ran (KOR)	314 kg	Mu Shuangshuang (CHN)	314 kg	Olha Korobka (UKR)	284 kg

== Records ==
Prior to this competition, the existing world records were as follows.

World Record	Snatch	Jang Mi-ran (KOR)	138 kg	Wonju, South Korea	22 May 2006
World Record	Clean & Jerk	Tang Gonghong (CHN)	182 kg	Athens, Greece	21 August 2004
World Record	Total	Jang Mi-ran (KOR)	318 kg	Wonju, South Korea	22 May 2006

== Results ==
Rank	Athlete	Group	Body weight	Snatch (kg)				Clean & Jerk (kg)				Total
Rank	Athlete	Group	Body weight	1	2	3	Rank	1	2	3	Rank	Total
1st place, gold medalist(s)	Jang Mi-ran (KOR)	A	113.52	~~130~~	130	135	2nd place, silver medalist(s)	170	175	179	1st place, gold medalist(s)	314
2nd place, silver medalist(s)	Mu Shuangshuang (CHN)	A	130.91	130	~~135~~	136	1st place, gold medalist(s)	165	172	178	2nd place, silver medalist(s)	314
3rd place, bronze medalist(s)	Olha Korobka (UKR)	A	164.39	121	125	127	3rd place, bronze medalist(s)	153	157	~~160~~	3rd place, bronze medalist(s)	284
4	Cheryl Haworth (USA)	A	135.55	118	121	~~125~~	4	148	~~153~~	153	4	274
5	Alexandra Aborneva (KAZ)	A	87.08	105	110	~~115~~	12	140	147	~~150~~	5	257
6	Oliba Nieve (ECU)	A	93.51	110	115	~~118~~	8	137	142	~~146~~	7	257
7	Agata Wróbel (POL)	A	114.83	112	~~116~~	~~116~~	10	~~144~~	145	~~148~~	6	257
8	Eva Dimas (ESA)	A	83.82	110	115	~~118~~	7	135	~~140~~	141	8	256
9	Yuliya Dovhal (UKR)	B	83.91	112	~~117~~	117	6	~~138~~	~~138~~	138	10	255
10	Tatsiana Hramyka (BLR)	B	97.09	110	115	120	5	~~130~~	132	~~140~~	15	252
11	Mariya Grabovetskaya (KAZ)	B	97.10	105	110	115	9	~~135~~	135	~~141~~	11	250
12	Katsiaryna Shkuratava (BLR)	A	100.74	108	~~113~~	~~113~~	14	140	~~148~~	~~148~~	9	248
13	Vasiliki Kasapi (GRE)	B	121.30	107	111	112	11	130	~~135~~	135	13	247
14	Yordanka Apostolova (BUL)	B	100.06	105	~~110~~	110	13	125	130	133	14	243
15	Cristina Suárez (VEN)	C	103.26	100	~~103~~	103	17	127	132	135	12	238
16	Aikaterini Roditi (GRE)	B	101.30	102	106	108	15	127	~~131~~	~~131~~	18	235
17	Yinelis Burgos (DOM)	C	96.01	94	98	101	19	124	130	~~135~~	16	231
18	Sally El-Sayed (EGY)	B	84.55	95	100	~~102~~	20	120	~~126~~	127	17	227
19	Magdalena Ufnal (POL)	B	117.65	102	~~106~~	~~106~~	18	~~124~~	124	~~130~~	21	226
20	María Carvajal (DOM)	C	89.66	99	102	104	16	119	~~123~~	~~123~~	24	223
21	Fumiko Jonai (JPN)	C	105.86	88	92	95	23	121	~~126~~	126	19	221
22	Olivia Salinas (MEX)	C	97.19	90	95	~~100~~	22	115	120	~~123~~	22	215
23	Ma Hui-chun (TPE)	C	102.62	90	~~95~~	~~95~~	27	120	125	~~128~~	20	215
24	Tai Hsiao-chun (TPE)	B	138.96	95	~~100~~	~~100~~	24	120	—	—	23	215
25	Jessica Pacho (ECU)	C	94.29	90	~~95~~	~~95~~	26	110	~~115~~	115	25	205
26	Viktória Varga (HUN)	C	94.98	88	~~92~~	92	25	~~112~~	~~112~~	112	26	204
27	Annarosa Campaldini (ITA)	C	104.28	85	~~90~~	~~90~~	28	105	110	~~113~~	27	195
28	Elizabeth Cortez (CHI)	C	107.69	75	~~80~~	~~80~~	30	~~100~~	~~100~~	100	28	175
29	Rosa Magro (ITA)	C	101.56	~~75~~	75	~~81~~	29	90	95	~~100~~	29	170
—	Kamila Białkowska (NED)	C	86.00	~~95~~	~~95~~	95	21	~~113~~	~~113~~	~~113~~	—	—
