= Weightlifting at the 2006 Asian Games – Women's +75 kg =

Women's +75 kg at the 2006 Asian Games
- Venue: Al-Dana Banquet Hall
- Date: 6 December 2006
- Competitors: 6 from 5 nations

Medalists
gold medal	Mu Shuangshuang	China
silver medal	Jang Mi-ran	South Korea
bronze medal	Annipa Moontar	Thailand

The women's +75 kilograms event at the 2006 Asian Games took place on December 6, 2006, at Al-Dana Banquet Hall in Doha.

== Schedule ==
All times are Arabia Standard Time (UTC+03:00)

Date	Time	Event
Wednesday, 6 December 2006	13:00	Group A

== Records ==
Prior to this competition, the existing world, Asian and Games records were as follows.

World Record	Snatch	Jang Mi-ran (KOR)	138 kg	Wonju, South Korea	22 May 2006
World Record	Clean & Jerk	Tang Gonghong (CHN)	182 kg	Athens, Greece	21 August 2004
World Record	Total	Jang Mi-ran (KOR)	318 kg	Wonju, South Korea	22 May 2006
Asian Record	Snatch	Jang Mi-ran (KOR)	138 kg	Wonju, South Korea	22 May 2006
Asian Record	Clean & Jerk	Tang Gonghong (CHN)	182 kg	Athens, Greece	21 August 2004
Asian Record	Total	Jang Mi-ran (KOR)	318 kg	Wonju, South Korea	22 May 2006
Games Record	Snatch	Ding Meiyuan (CHN)	120 kg	Bangkok, Thailand	13 December 1998
Games Record	Clean & Jerk	Tang Gonghong (CHN)	167 kg	Busan, South Korea	8 October 2002
Games Record	Total	Tang Gonghong (CHN)	287 kg	Busan, South Korea	8 October 2002

== Results ==
Legend

- NM — No mark

Rank	Athlete	Group	Body weight	Snatch (kg)				Clean & Jerk (kg)				Total
Rank	Athlete	Group	Body weight	1	2	3	Result	1	2	3	Result	Total
1st place, gold medalist(s)	Mu Shuangshuang (CHN)	A	132.04	131	136	139	139	167	174	178	178	317
2nd place, silver medalist(s)	Jang Mi-ran (KOR)	A	113.61	130	135	~~139~~	135	171	178	~~182~~	178	313
3rd place, bronze medalist(s)	Annipa Moontar (THA)	A	94.97	105	112	117	117	136	142	148	148	265
4	Alexandra Aborneva (KAZ)	A	87.65	105	112	115	115	138	144	~~150~~	144	259
5	Fumiko Jonai (JPN)	A	105.03	85	90	95	95	120	~~127~~	~~127~~	120	215
—	Mariya Grabovetskaya (KAZ)	A	97.17	~~115~~	—	—	—	—	—	—	—	NM

== New records ==
The following records were established during the competition.

Snatch	130	Jang Mi-ran (KOR)	GR
Snatch	131	Mu Shuangshuang (CHN)	GR
Snatch	135	Jang Mi-ran (KOR)	GR
Snatch	136	Mu Shuangshuang (CHN)	GR
Snatch	139	Mu Shuangshuang (CHN)	WR
Clean & Jerk	171	Jang Mi-ran (KOR)	GR
Clean & Jerk	174	Mu Shuangshuang (CHN)	GR
Clean & Jerk	178	Jang Mi-ran (KOR)	GR
Total	306	Mu Shuangshuang (CHN)	GR
Total	313	Mu Shuangshuang (CHN)	GR
Total	317	Mu Shuangshuang (CHN)	GR
