= 2007 World Weightlifting Championships – Women's +75 kg =

The women's competition in 75 kg division was staged on September 25–26, 2007.

== Schedule ==
Date	Time	Event
25 September 2007	17:00	Group C
26 September 2007	09:30	Group B
26 September 2007	14:30	Group A

== Medalists ==
Event	Gold		Silver		Bronze	
Snatch	Mu Shuangshuang (CHN)	139 kg	Jang Mi-ran (KOR)	138 kg	Olha Korobka (UKR)	126 kg
Clean & Jerk	Jang Mi-ran (KOR)	181 kg	Mu Shuangshuang (CHN)	180 kg	Olha Korobka (UKR)	155 kg
Total	Jang Mi-ran (KOR)	319 kg	Mu Shuangshuang (CHN)	319 kg	Olha Korobka (UKR)	281 kg

== Records ==
Prior to this competition, the existing world records were as follows.

World Record	Snatch	Mu Shuangshuang (CHN)	139 kg	Doha, Qatar	6 December 2006
World Record	Clean & Jerk	Tang Gonghong (CHN)	182 kg	Athens, Greece	21 August 2004
World Record	Total	Jang Mi-ran (KOR)	318 kg	Wonju, South Korea	22 May 2006

== Results ==
Rank	Athlete	Group	Body weight	Snatch (kg)				Clean & Jerk (kg)				Total
Rank	Athlete	Group	Body weight	1	2	3	Rank	1	2	3	Rank	Total
1st place, gold medalist(s)	Jang Mi-ran (KOR)	A	115.17	130	135	138	2nd place, silver medalist(s)	171	178	181	1st place, gold medalist(s)	319
2nd place, silver medalist(s)	Mu Shuangshuang (CHN)	A	135.60	131	136	139	1st place, gold medalist(s)	171	177	180	2nd place, silver medalist(s)	319
3rd place, bronze medalist(s)	Olha Korobka (UKR)	A	164.22	121	123	126	3rd place, bronze medalist(s)	152	155	~~160~~	3rd place, bronze medalist(s)	281
4	Katsiaryna Shkuratava (BLR)	A	103.66	114	118	121	4	142	148	152	4	273
5	Alexandra Aborneva (KAZ)	A	90.89	107	112	115	9	142	147	149	5	264
6	Vasiliki Kasapi (GRE)	A	127.62	115	120	~~122~~	5	138	141	144	7	264
7	Aikaterini Roditi (GRE)	A	100.03	~~112~~	112	117	6	140	~~145~~	145	6	262
8	Oliba Nieve (ECU)	A	93.79	~~112~~	112	116	8	142	~~146~~	~~147~~	8	258
9	Mariam Usman (NGR)	B	112.89	110	115	117	7	135	~~140~~	140	10	257
10	Annipa Moontar (THA)	A	99.66	110	~~115~~	115	10	~~140~~	140	~~145~~	9	255
11	Ele Opeloge (SAM)	A	117.80	105	110	~~114~~	11	140	~~148~~	~~148~~	11	250
12	Cheryl Haworth (USA)	A	138.19	~~110~~	110	~~113~~	13	140	—	—	12	250
13	Magdalena Ufnal (POL)	A	122.15	106	110	~~114~~	12	130	~~135~~	~~135~~	22	240
14	Yordanka Apostolova (BUL)	B	99.94	105	109	~~111~~	14	130	~~133~~	~~133~~	21	239
15	Eva Dimas (ESA)	B	79.93	102	106	~~110~~	15	127	130	~~133~~	20	236
16	Emmy Vargas (USA)	B	96.47	100	~~105~~	~~105~~	18	127	132	136	13	236
17	Yinelis Burgos (DOM)	C	94.27	93	98	103	16	117	125	132	16	235
18	Vasilka Dineva (BUL)	B	103.66	92	95	97	21	128	~~135~~	135	14	232
19	Mami Shimamoto (JPN)	B	104.41	97	~~101~~	101	17	125	~~131~~	131	19	232
20	Geeta Rani (IND)	C	107.00	95	100	~~105~~	20	125	132	~~136~~	18	232
21	Fumiko Jonai (JPN)	B	106.93	93	~~96~~	96	22	127	132	~~137~~	17	228
22	Cristina Suárez (VEN)	B	105.14	100	~~103~~	~~103~~	19	127	—	—	25	227
23	Ma Hui-chun (TPE)	C	109.15	~~93~~	~~93~~	93	26	124	130	133	15	226
24	Afaf Ibrahim (EGY)	B	91.42	92	95	~~97~~	23	123	127	~~130~~	24	222
25	Derya Açikgöz (TUR)	B	95.52	90	~~95~~	~~95~~	27	125	128	~~130~~	23	218
26	Kefilini Tualau (TGA)	C	135.71	90	~~95~~	95	24	~~115~~	115	~~120~~	26	210
27	Nguyễn Thị Kim Vân (VIE)	C	82.11	~~80~~	80	85	28	95	100	~~105~~	27	185
—	Lee Hui-sol (KOR)	B	104.98	93	~~98~~	~~98~~	25	~~122~~	~~122~~	~~122~~	—	—

== New records ==
Total	319 kg	Mu Shuangshuang (CHN)	WR
