= Weightlifting at the 2010 Asian Games – Women's +75 kg =

Women's +75 kg at the 2010 Asian Games
- Venue: Dongguan Arena
- Date: 19 November 2010
- Competitors: 6 from 5 nations

Medalists
gold medal	Jang Mi-ran	South Korea
silver medal	Meng Suping	China
bronze medal	Mariya Grabovetskaya	Kazakhstan

The women's +75 kilograms event at the 2010 Asian Games took place on 19 November 2010 at Dongguan Arena.

== Schedule ==
All times are China Standard Time (UTC+08:00)

Date	Time	Event
Friday, 19 November 2010	17:00	Group A

== Records ==
Prior to this competition, the existing world, Asian and Games records were as follows.

World Record	Snatch	Tatiana Kashirina (RUS)	145 kg	Antalya, Turkey	25 September 2010
World Record	Clean & Jerk	Jang Mi-ran (KOR)	187 kg	Goyang, South Korea	28 November 2009
World Record	Total	Jang Mi-ran (KOR)	326 kg	Beijing, China	16 August 2008
Asian Record	Snatch	Jang Mi-ran (KOR)	140 kg	Beijing, China	16 August 2008
Asian Record	Clean & Jerk	Jang Mi-ran (KOR)	187 kg	Goyang, South Korea	28 November 2009
Asian Record	Total	Jang Mi-ran (KOR)	326 kg	Beijing, China	16 August 2008
Games Record	Snatch	Mu Shuangshuang (CHN)	139 kg	Doha, Qatar	6 December 2006
Games Record	Clean & Jerk	Jang Mi-ran (KOR)	178 kg	Doha, Qatar	6 December 2006
Games Record	Total	Mu Shuangshuang (CHN)	317 kg	Doha, Qatar	6 December 2006

== Results ==
Rank	Athlete	Group	Body weight	Snatch (kg)				Clean & Jerk (kg)				Total
Rank	Athlete	Group	Body weight	1	2	3	Result	1	2	3	Result	Total
1st place, gold medalist(s)	Jang Mi-ran (KOR)	A	115.92	~~130~~	130	~~134~~	130	175	181	~~188~~	181	311
2nd place, silver medalist(s)	Meng Suping (CHN)	A	116.70	130	~~135~~	135	135	~~175~~	176	~~182~~	176	311
3rd place, bronze medalist(s)	Mariya Grabovetskaya (KAZ)	A	113.95	125	130	135	135	145	155	~~160~~	155	290
4	Alexandra Aborneva (KAZ)	A	96.14	105	110	112	112	140	145	~~150~~	145	257
5	Chitchanok Pulsabsakul (THA)	A	118.43	108	111	115	115	135	~~140~~	140	140	255
6	Geeta Rani (IND)	A	113.88	95	~~100~~	~~100~~	95	120	127	132	132	227

== New records ==
The following records were established during the competition.

Clean & Jerk	181	Jang Mi-ran (KOR)	GR
