= Weightlifting at the 2008 Summer Olympics =

Weightlifting at the Games of the XXIX Olympiad
- Venue: Beihang University Gymnasium
- Dates: 9–19 August 2008
- No. of events: 15
- Competitors: 253 from 83 nations

Weightlifting competitions at the 2008 Summer Olympics in Beijing, China were held from August 9 to August 19. Competitions were conducted at the Beihang University Gymnasium.

The medal records at the 2008 Games were heavily amended following a re-analysis of competitors samples in 2015, 2016 and 2017. 26 lifters were disqualified due to these tests, including 16 medalists and four lifters who stood to inherit forfeited medals.

== Medal table ==
Rank	Nation	Gold	Silver	Bronze	Total
1	China	5	1	0	6
2	South Korea	2	2	0	4
3	Russia	1	2	0	3
4	Chinese Taipei	1	1	0	2
4	North Korea	1	1	0	2
6	Thailand	1	0	2	3
7	Poland	1	0	1	2
8	Belarus	1	0	0	1
8	Germany	1	0	0	1
8	Kazakhstan	1	0	0	1
11	Colombia	0	2	0	2
12	Armenia	0	1	1	2
13	France	0	1	0	1
13	Georgia	0	1	0	1
13	Samoa	0	1	0	1
13	Spain	0	1	0	1
13	Vietnam	0	1	0	1
18	Cuba	0	0	3	3
18	Indonesia	0	0	3	3
20	Canada	0	0	1	1
20	Egypt	0	0	1	1
20	Latvia	0	0	1	1
20	Mexico	0	0	1	1
20	Nigeria	0	0	1	1
Totals (24 entries)		15	15	15	45

== Medalists ==
=== Men ===
Event	Gold	Silver	Bronze
56 kg	Long Qingquan; China	Hoàng Anh Tuấn; Vietnam	Eko Yuli Irawan; Indonesia
62 kg	Zhang Xiangxiang; China	Diego Salazar; Colombia	Triyatno; Indonesia
69 kg^{[a]}	Liao Hui; China	Vencelas Dabaya; France	Yordanis Borrero; Cuba
77 kg	Sa Jae-hyouk; South Korea	Li Hongli; China	Gevorg Davtyan; Armenia
85 kg^{[b]}	Lu Yong; China	Tigran Martirosyan; Armenia	Jadier Valladares; Cuba
94 kg^{[c]}	Szymon Kołecki; Poland	Arsen Kasabiev; Georgia	Yoandry Hernández; Cuba
105 kg^{[d]}	Andrei Aramnau; Belarus	Dmitry Klokov; Russia	Marcin Dołęga; Poland
+105 kg	Matthias Steiner; Germany	Evgeny Chigishev; Russia	Viktors Ščerbatihs; Latvia

=== Women ===
Event	Gold	Silver	Bronze
48 kg^{[e]}	Chen Wei-ling; Chinese Taipei	Im Jyoung-hwa; South Korea	Pensiri Laosirikul; Thailand
53 kg^{[g]}	Prapawadee Jaroenrattanatarakoon; Thailand	Yoon Jin-hee; South Korea	Raema Lisa Rumbewas; Indonesia
58 kg^{[h]}	Chen Yanqing; China	O Jong-ae; North Korea	Wandee Kameaim; Thailand
63 kg^{[i]}	Pak Hyon-suk; North Korea	Lu Ying-chi; Chinese Taipei	Christine Girard; Canada
69 kg^{[j]}	Oxana Slivenko; Russia	Leydi Solís; Colombia	Abeer Abdelrahman; Egypt
75 kg^{[k]}	Alla Vazhenina; Kazakhstan	Lydia Valentín; Spain	Damaris Aguirre; Mexico
+75 kg^{[l]}	Jang Mi-ran; South Korea	Ele Opeloge; Samoa	Mariam Usman; Nigeria

- ^{Men's 69 kg} Tigran Gevorg Martirosyan of Armenia originally won the bronze medal, but he was disqualified after a positive anti-doping test of his 2008 sample.
- ^{Men's 85 kg} Andrei Rybakou of Belarus originally won the silver medal, but he was disqualified after a positive anti-doping test of his 2008 sample.
- ^{Men's 94 kg} Ilya Ilyin of Kazakhstan and Khadzhimurat Akkaev of Russia originally won the gold and bronze medal respectively, but they were disqualified after positive anti-doping tests of their 2008 samples.
- ^{Men's 105 kg} Dmitry Lapikov of Russia originally won the bronze medal, but he was disqualified after a positive anti-doping test of his 2008 sample.
- ^{Women's 48 kg} Chen Xiexia of China and Sibel Özkan of Turkey originally won the gold and silver medal respectively, but they were disqualified after a positive anti-doping test of their 2008 samples.
- ^{Women's 53 kg} Nastassia Novikava of Belarus originally won the bronze medal, but she was disqualified after a positive anti-doping test of her 2008 sample.
- ^{Women's 58 kg} Marina Shainova of Russia originally won the silver medal, but she was disqualified after a positive anti-doping test of her 2008 sample.
- ^{Women's 63 kg} Irina Nekrassova of Kazakhstan originally won the silver medal, but she was disqualified after a positive anti-doping test of her 2008 sample.
- ^{Women's 69 kg} Liu Chunhong of China and Nataliya Davydova of Ukraine originally won the gold and bronze medal respectively, but they were disqualified after positive anti-doping tests of their 2008 samples.
- ^{Women's 75 kg} Cao Lei of China and Nadezhda Evstyukhina of Russia originally won the gold and bronze medal respectively, but they were disqualified after positive anti-doping test of their 2008 samples.
- ^{Women's +75 kg} Olha Korobka of Ukraine and Mariya Grabovetskaya of Kazakhstan originally won the silver and bronze medal respectively, but they were disqualified after positive anti-doping test of their 2008 samples.

== Participating nations ==
A total of 253 weightlifters from 83 nations competed at the Beijing Games:

- Albania (3)
- Algeria (1)
- Armenia (6)
- Australia (2)
- Azerbaijan (5)
- Belarus (10)
- Belgium (1)
- Bolivia (1)
- Brazil (1)
- Cameroon (1)
- Canada (5)
- Chile (1)
- China (10)
- Chinese Taipei (5)
- Colombia (9)
- Cook Islands (1)
- Cuba (6)
- Cyprus (1)
- Czech Republic (1)
- Dominican Republic (2)
- Ecuador (2)
- Egypt (5)
- El Salvador (1)
- Federated States of Micronesia (1)
- Fiji (1)
- Finland (1)
- France (4)
- Georgia (3)
- Germany (5)
- Great Britain (1)
- Greece (4)
- Guatemala (1)
- Hungary (1)
- Indonesia (5)
- Iran (3)
- Italy (4)
- Japan (6)
- Kazakhstan (8)
- Kiribati (1)
- Kyrgyzstan (1)
- Latvia (1)
- Lithuania (1)
- Malaysia (1)
- Mauritius (1)
- Mexico (2)
- Moldova (5)
- Monaco (1)
- Mongolia (1)
- Nauru (1)
- Nepal (1)
- New Zealand (2)
- Nicaragua (1)
- Nigeria (3)
- North Korea (7)
- Norway (1)
- Papua New Guinea (1)
- Peru (1)
- Philippines (1)
- Poland (10)
- Puerto Rico (1)
- Romania (5)
- Russia (10)
- Samoa (1)
- Seychelles (1)
- Slovakia (2)
- Solomon Islands (1)
- South Africa (1)
- South Korea (9)
- Spain (2)
- Sri Lanka (1)
- Syria (1)
- Tajikistan (1)
- Thailand (7)
- Tonga (1)
- Tunisia (2)
- Turkey (6)
- Turkmenistan (2)
- Tuvalu (1)
- Ukraine (9)
- United States (6)
- Uzbekistan (2)
- Venezuela (7)
- Vietnam (2)
