= 2005 Asian Weightlifting Championships =

International weightlifting competition

The 2005 Asian Weightlifting Championships were held in Dubai in United Arab Emirates between September 23 and October 1, 2005. It was the 37th men's and 18th women's championship. The event was organised by the Asian Weightlifting Federation.

== Medal summary ==
=== Men ===
Event	Gold		Silver		Bronze	
56 kg
Snatch	Wang Shin-yuan; Chinese Taipei	125 kg	Hoàng Anh Tuấn; Vietnam	125 kg	Choe Hyon-chol; North Korea	118 kg
Clean & Jerk	Chen Biao; China	155 kg	Yang Chin-yi; Chinese Taipei	153 kg	Hoàng Anh Tuấn; Vietnam	152 kg
Total	Hoàng Anh Tuấn; Vietnam	277 kg	Wang Shin-yuan; Chinese Taipei	276 kg	Yang Chin-yi; Chinese Taipei	271 kg
62 kg
Snatch	Zhang Jie; China	132 kg	Li Chunsheng; China	124 kg	Niwat Kritphet; Thailand	116 kg
Clean & Jerk	Li Chunsheng; China	164 kg	Zhang Jie; China	163 kg	Jo Myong-jin; North Korea	158 kg
Total	Zhang Jie; China	295 kg	Li Chunsheng; China	288 kg	Yang Sheng-hsiung; Chinese Taipei	271 kg
69 kg
Snatch	Yao Yuewei; China	156 kg	Luo Shaomeng; China	140 kg	Kuanysh Rakhatov; Kazakhstan	139 kg
Clean & Jerk	Luo Shaomeng; China	176 kg	Yao Yuewei; China	175 kg	Ronnayuth Amnoiwong; Thailand	164 kg
Total	Yao Yuewei; China	331 kg	Luo Shaomeng; China	316 kg	Kuanysh Rakhatov; Kazakhstan	294 kg
77 kg
Snatch	Vladimir Kuznetsov; Kazakhstan	155 kg	Nader Sufyan Abbas; Qatar	150 kg	Chen Jianhui; China	145 kg
Clean & Jerk	Vladimir Kuznetsov; Kazakhstan	190 kg	Nader Sufyan Abbas; Qatar	186 kg	Kim Kwang-nam; North Korea	185 kg
Total	Vladimir Kuznetsov; Kazakhstan	345 kg	Nader Sufyan Abbas; Qatar	336 kg	Kim Kwang-nam; North Korea	325 kg
85 kg
Snatch	Vladimir Sedov; Kazakhstan	156 kg	Zang Wei; China	152 kg	Ulanbek Moldodosov; Kyrgyzstan	151 kg
Clean & Jerk	Ulanbek Moldodosov; Kyrgyzstan	190 kg	Hsieh Wei-chun; Chinese Taipei	187 kg	Zang Wei; China	180 kg
Total	Ulanbek Moldodosov; Kyrgyzstan	341 kg	Hsieh Wei-chun; Chinese Taipei	334 kg	Zang Wei; China	332 kg
94 kg
Snatch	Asghar Ebrahimi; Iran	175 kg	Sergey Sedov; Kazakhstan	160 kg	Sergey Istomin; Kazakhstan	155 kg
Clean & Jerk	Asghar Ebrahimi; Iran	205 kg	Ali Dehghanian; Iran	203 kg	Sergey Sedov; Kazakhstan	196 kg
Total	Asghar Ebrahimi; Iran	380 kg	Ali Dehghanian; Iran	358 kg	Sergey Sedov; Kazakhstan	356 kg
105 kg
Snatch	Said Saif Asaad; Qatar	180 kg	Mohsen Beiranvand; Iran	177 kg	Dmitriy Frolov; Kazakhstan	166 kg
Clean & Jerk	Said Saif Asaad; Qatar	210 kg	Mohsen Beiranvand; Iran	206 kg	Dmitriy Frolov; Kazakhstan	202 kg
Total	Said Saif Asaad; Qatar	390 kg	Mohsen Beiranvand; Iran	383 kg	Dmitriy Frolov; Kazakhstan	368 kg
+105 kg
Snatch	Hossein Rezazadeh; Iran	200 kg	Jaber Saeed Salem; Qatar	190 kg	Igor Khalilov; Uzbekistan	180 kg
Clean & Jerk	Hossein Rezazadeh; Iran	260 kg	Jaber Saeed Salem; Qatar	232 kg	Igor Khalilov; Uzbekistan	220 kg
Total	Hossein Rezazadeh; Iran	460 kg	Jaber Saeed Salem; Qatar	422 kg	Igor Khalilov; Uzbekistan	400 kg

=== Women ===
Event	Gold		Silver		Bronze	
48 kg
Snatch	Ye Ying; China	89 kg	Pensiri Saelaw; Thailand	88 kg	Thongyim Bunphithak; Thailand	85 kg
Clean & Jerk	Pensiri Saelaw; Thailand	115 kg	Thongyim Bunphithak; Thailand	112 kg	Ye Ying; China	110 kg
Total	Pensiri Saelaw; Thailand	203 kg	Ye Ying; China	199 kg	Thongyim Bunphithak; Thailand	197 kg
53 kg
Snatch	Junpim Kuntatean; Thailand	94 kg	RI Hyon-ok; North Korea	87 kg	Fang Hsin-tzu; Chinese Taipei	85 kg
Clean & Jerk	Junpim Kuntatean; Thailand	119 kg	RI Hyon-ok; North Korea	113 kg	Fang Hsin-tzu; Chinese Taipei	110 kg
Total	Junpim Kuntatean; Thailand	213 kg	RI Hyon-ok; North Korea	200 kg	Fang Hsin-tzu; Chinese Taipei	195 kg
58 kg
Snatch	Wandee Kameaim; Thailand	97 kg	Tang Lanhua; China	93 kg	Patmawati Abdul Hamid; Indonesia	80 kg
Clean & Jerk	Wandee Kameaim; Thailand	125 kg	Tang Lanhua; China	125 kg	Patmawati Abdul Hamid; Indonesia	98 kg
Total	Wandee Kameaim; Thailand	222 kg	Tang Lanhua; China	218 kg	Patmawati Abdul Hamid; Indonesia	178 kg
63 kg
Snatch	Pawina Thongsuk; Thailand	105 kg	Li Chunmei; China	99 kg	Olga Sablina; Kazakhstan	98 kg
Clean & Jerk	Pawina Thongsuk; Thailand	135 kg	Kim Song-sim; North Korea	125 kg	Olga Sablina; Kazakhstan	124 kg
Total	Pawina Thongsuk; Thailand	240 kg	Olga Sablina; Kazakhstan	222 kg	Li Chunmei; China	221 kg
69 kg
Snatch	Zhang Ning; China	100 kg	Nissara Lohajeerang; Thailand	95 kg	Nansita Devi; India	93 kg
Clean & Jerk	Zhang Ning; China	123 kg	Nissara Lohajeerang; Thailand	122 kg	Nansita Devi; India	110 kg
Total	Zhang Ning; China	223 kg	Nissara Lohajeerang; Thailand	217 kg	Nansita Devi; India	203 kg
75 kg
Snatch	Zhang Ning; China	106 kg	Irina Vlassova; Kazakhstan	106 kg	Shailaja Pujari; India	101 kg
Clean & Jerk	Zhang Ning; China	138 kg	Shailaja Pujari; India	138 kg	Irina Vlassova; Kazakhstan	133 kg
Total	Zhang Ning; China	244 kg	Shailaja Pujari; India	239 kg	Irina Vlassova; Kazakhstan	239 kg
+75 kg
Snatch	Mariya Grabovetskaya; Kazakhstan	115 kg	Alexandra Aborneva; Kazakhstan	105 kg	Geeta Rani; India	101 kg
Clean & Jerk	Mariya Grabovetskaya; Kazakhstan	140 kg	Alexandra Aborneva; Kazakhstan	135 kg	Geeta Rani; India	132 kg
Total	Mariya Grabovetskaya; Kazakhstan	255 kg	Alexandra Aborneva; Kazakhstan	240 kg	Geeta Rani; India	233 kg

== Medal table ==
Ranking by Big (Total result) medals

Rank	Nation	Gold	Silver	Bronze	Total
1	China	4	4	2	10
2	Thailand	4	1	1	6
3	Kazakhstan	2	2	4	8
4	Iran	2	2	0	4
5	Qatar	1	2	0	3
6	Kyrgyzstan	1	0	0	1
6	Vietnam	1	0	0	1
8	Chinese Taipei	0	2	3	5
9	India	0	1	2	3
10	North Korea	0	1	1	2
11	Indonesia	0	0	1	1
11	Uzbekistan	0	0	1	1
Totals (12 entries)		15	15	15	45

Ranking by all medals: Big (Total result) and Small (Snatch and Clean & Jerk)

Rank	Nation	Gold	Silver	Bronze	Total
1	China	14	12	5	31
2	Thailand	11	5	4	20
3	Kazakhstan	7	6	12	25
4	Iran	6	5	0	11
5	Qatar	3	6	0	9
6	Kyrgyzstan	2	0	1	3
7	Chinese Taipei	1	4	5	10
8	Vietnam	1	1	1	3
9	North Korea	0	4	4	8
10	India	0	2	7	9
11	Indonesia	0	0	3	3
11	Uzbekistan	0	0	3	3
Totals (12 entries)		45	45	45	135

== Participating nations ==
110 athletes from 18 nations competed.

- Afghanistan (2)
- Bahrain (5)
- China (14)
- Chinese Taipei (6)
- India (7)
- Indonesia (5)
- Iran (8)
- Japan (7)
- Kazakhstan (14)
- Kyrgyzstan (3)
- North Korea (5)
- Philippines (3)
- Qatar (3)
- South Korea (2)
- Thailand (15)
- United Arab Emirates (1)
- Uzbekistan (4)
- Vietnam (6)
