= 2010 World Weightlifting Championships – Women's +75 kg =

The women's competition in the super-heavyweight (– 75 kg) division was held on 25 September 2010.

== Schedule ==
| Date | Time | Event |
|---|---|---|
| 24 September 2010 | 14:00 | Group B |
| 25 September 2010 | 15:00 | Group A |

== Medalists ==
| Event | Gold | | Silver | | Bronze | |
|---|---|---|---|---|---|---|
| Snatch | Tatiana Kashirina (RUS) | 145 kg | Meng Suping (CHN) | 131 kg | Jang Mi-ran (KOR) | 130 kg |
| Clean & Jerk | Meng Suping (CHN) | 179 kg | Jang Mi-ran (KOR) | 179 kg | Tatiana Kashirina (RUS) | 170 kg |
| Total | Tatiana Kashirina (RUS) | 315 kg | Meng Suping (CHN) | 310 kg | Jang Mi-ran (KOR) | 309 kg |

== Records ==
Prior to this competition, the existing world records were as follows.

| World Record | Snatch | Jang Mi-ran (KOR) | 140 kg | Beijing, China | 16 August 2008 |
| World Record | Clean & Jerk | Jang Mi-ran (KOR) | 187 kg | Goyang, South Korea | 28 November 2009 |
| World Record | Total | Jang Mi-ran (KOR) | 326 kg | Beijing, China | 16 August 2008 |

== Results ==
| Rank | Athlete | Group | Body weight | Snatch (kg) | | | | Clean & Jerk (kg) | | | | Total |
| Rank | Athlete | Group | Body weight | 1 | 2 | 3 | Rank | 1 | 2 | 3 | Rank | Total |
|---|---|---|---|---|---|---|---|---|---|---|---|---|
| 1st place, gold medalist(s) | Tatiana Kashirina (RUS) | A | 96.93 | 135 | 141 | 145 | 1st place, gold medalist(s) | 165 | 170 | ~~175~~ | 3rd place, bronze medalist(s) | 315 |
| 2nd place, silver medalist(s) | Meng Suping (CHN) | A | 115.72 | 120 | 126 | 131 | 2nd place, silver medalist(s) | 165 | 177 | 179 | 1st place, gold medalist(s) | 310 |
| 3rd place, bronze medalist(s) | Jang Mi-ran (KOR) | A | 116.12 | 125 | ~~130~~ | 130 | 3rd place, bronze medalist(s) | 167 | ~~176~~ | 179 | 2nd place, silver medalist(s) | 309 |
| 4 | Alexandra Aborneva (KAZ) | A | 94.84 | 113 | ~~117~~ | ~~120~~ | 5 | 145 | 147 | ~~155~~ | 5 | 260 |
| 5 | Oliba Nieve (ECU) | A | 92.09 | 107 | 112 | ~~117~~ | 6 | 140 | ~~146~~ | 146 | 6 | 258 |
| 6 | Yuliya Dovhal (UKR) | A | 87.43 | 115 | ~~120~~ | ~~120~~ | 4 | 137 | ~~142~~ | 142 | 7 | 257 |
| 7 | Mami Shimamoto (JPN) | B | 101.39 | 106 | 110 | 112 | 7 | 137 | 140 | ~~144~~ | 10 | 252 |
| 8 | Fumiko Jonai (JPN) | B | 107.22 | 100 | ~~103~~ | 103 | 13 | 140 | 144 | 148 | 4 | 251 |
| 9 | Sarah Robles (USA) | B | 122.24 | 104 | 108 | 111 | 8 | ~~139~~ | ~~140~~ | 140 | 11 | 251 |
| 10 | Svitlana Cherniavska (UKR) | A | 103.60 | 106 | ~~110~~ | ~~110~~ | 12 | 134 | 138 | 141 | 8 | 247 |
| 11 | Afaf Ibrahim (EGY) | B | 99.47 | 101 | ~~106~~ | 106 | 11 | 131 | 136 | 140 | 9 | 246 |
| 12 | Kathleen Schöppe (GER) | B | 94.31 | 100 | 104 | 106 | 10 | 130 | 134 | 136 | 14 | 242 |
| 13 | Shaimaa Khalaf (EGY) | B | 110.08 | 97 | 101 | ~~105~~ | 15 | 128 | 134 | 138 | 13 | 239 |
| 14 | Liu Yun-chien (TPE) | B | 100.55 | 93 | 98 | ~~101~~ | 17 | 130 | 138 | ~~143~~ | 12 | 236 |
| 15 | Ümmühan Uçar (TUR) | B | 80.95 | 95 | 101 | 106 | 9 | 120 | 125 | 128 | 15 | 234 |
| 16 | Sabina Bagińska (POL) | B | 98.79 | 100 | 102 | ~~104~~ | 14 | ~~125~~ | 125 | ~~130~~ | 16 | 227 |
| 17 | Krisztina Magát (HUN) | B | 102.36 | 91 | 95 | 98 | 18 | 115 | 120 | 124 | 17 | 222 |
| 18 | María Carvajal (DOM) | B | 89.60 | 94 | ~~99~~ | 100 | 16 | 114 | 120 | ~~124~~ | 19 | 220 |
| 19 | Annarosa Campaldini (ITA) | B | 97.51 | 90 | 95 | ~~98~~ | 19 | 113 | 120 | 123 | 18 | 218 |
| 20 | Tsend-Ayuushiin Ariunjargal (MGL) | B | 104.36 | 72 | ~~77~~ | ~~77~~ | 23 | 100 | ~~105~~ | 105 | 20 | 177 |
| 21 | Sükhbaataryn Sarantsetseg (MGL) | B | 83.24 | 77 | ~~82~~ | ~~82~~ | 22 | 93 | 98 | ~~102~~ | 21 | 175 |
| 22 | Ganna Pustovarova (UZB) | B | 101.29 | ~~78~~ | 78 | ~~82~~ | 21 | 97 | ~~101~~ | ~~101~~ | 22 | 175 |
| — | Tania Mascorro (MEX) | B | 99.52 | 85 | ~~90~~ | ~~90~~ | 20 | ~~115~~ | ~~115~~ | ~~115~~ | — | — |
| DQ | Hripsime Khurshudyan (ARM) | A | 86.05 | 123 | ~~130~~ | ~~130~~ | — | 152 | 160 | — | — | — |

== New records ==
| Snatch | 141 kg | Tatiana Kashirina (RUS) | WR |
| Snatch | 145 kg | Tatiana Kashirina (RUS) | WR |
