= Jang Mi-ran =

South Korean weightlifter (born 1983)

- Jang in 2012

Personal information
- Nationality: South Korean
- Born: October 9, 1983 (age 42) Wonju, Gangwon Province, South Korea
- Height: 170 cm (5 ft 7 in)
- Weight: 118.07 kg (260.3 lb)

Sport
- Country: South Korea
- Sport: Weightlifting
- Event: +75kg

Achievements and titles
- Personal bests: Snatch: 140 kg (2008); Clean and jerk: 187 kg (2009); Total: 326 kg (2008)
Medal record
Women's weightlifting
Representing South Korea
Olympic Games
Gold medal – first place	2008 Beijing	+75 kg
Silver medal – second place	2004 Athens	+75 kg
Bronze medal – third place	2012 London	+75 kg
World Championships
Gold medal – first place	2005 Doha	+75 kg
Gold medal – first place	2006 Santo Domingo	+75 kg
Gold medal – first place	2007 Chiang Mai	+75 kg
Gold medal – first place	2009 Goyang	+75 kg
Bronze medal – third place	2010 Antalya	+75 kg
Asian Games
Gold medal – first place	2010 Guangzhou	+75 kg
Silver medal – second place	2002 Busan	+75 kg
Silver medal – second place	2006 Doha	+75 kg
Asian Championships
Gold medal – first place	2012 Pyeongtaek	+75 kg

- Korean name
- Hangul: 장미란
- Hanja: 張美蘭
- RR: Jang Miran
- MR: Chang Miran

Jang Mi-ran (Korean: 장미란; pronounced [tɕɐŋ.mi.ɾɐn]; born October 9, 1983) is a South Korean Olympic weightlifter. She is currently based in Goyang, Gyeonggi Province, competing for the Goyang City Government Sports Club.

At the 2004 Summer Olympics, she won the silver medal in the +75 kg category, with a total of 302.5 kg.

On September 26, 2007, Jang won her third straight world championship overall title in the women's +75 kg category by lifting 319 kg of overalls in total (138 kg in the snatch, 181 kg of overalls in the clean and jerk). She also surpassed the world record, which was set by herself in May 2006 in Wonju, Korea, by one kilogram. Mu Shuangshuang, who lifted 319 kg in overalls as well, ranked second because of bodyweight, but broke the record an attempt earlier.

At the 2008 Summer Olympics, she won the gold medal in the +75 kg category. She broke the world records in the snatch with 140 kg, in the clean and jerk with 186 kg, and combined with 326 kg.

She won the gold medal in the +75 kg division at the 2010 Guangzhou Asian Games. With this medal, which was her first gold in Asian Games, she completed the weightlifting equivalent of a "grand slam" as champion in the Summer Olympics, world championships and Asian Games.

In February 2012, Jang announced the launch of her new foundation, Jang Miran Foundation, and stated that the mission of the Jang Miran Foundation is "[to help] young athletes in minor sports."

After failing to get a medal in the 2012 London Olympics, Jang decided to retire in January 2013, saying she wanted to focus on her foundation and continuing her education at Yong In University.

In November 2016, Hripsime Khurshudyan of Armenia was stripped of her bronze medal for doping, allowing Jang to move into 3rd place for the Women's 75+ kg Weightlifting Division at the London 2012 Summer Olympics.

2016 MBC drama Weightlifting Fairy Kim Bok-joo is inspired by the real-life story of Jang.

In 2015, Jang earned a doctorate in physical education from Yong In University. From 2016 to July 2023, she served as a professor in the Department of Physical Education at Yongin University. In July 2023, she was appointed as the second vice minister of Culture, Sports, and Tourism in South Korea.

== Major results ==
Year	Venue	Weight	Snatch (kg)				Clean & jerk (kg)				Total	Rank
Year	Venue	Weight	1	2	3	Rank	1	2	3	Rank	Total	Rank
Olympic Games
2004	Athens, Greece	+75 kg	125	130	~~132.5~~	2	165	~~170~~	172.5	2	302.5	2nd place, silver medalist(s)
2008	Beijing, China	+75 kg	130	136	140	1	175	183	186	1	326	1st place, gold medalist(s)
2012	London, United Kingdom	+75 kg	120	125	~~129~~	4	158	164	~~170~~	3	289	3rd place, bronze medalist(s)
World Championships
2003	Vancouver, Canada	+75 kg	~~115~~	115	~~120~~	10	152.5	157.5	~~165~~	3rd place, bronze medalist(s)	272.5	5
2005	Doha, Qatar	+75 kg	125	128	~~130~~	2nd place, silver medalist(s)	162	172	~~178~~	1st place, gold medalist(s)	300	1st place, gold medalist(s)
2006	Santo Domingo, Dominican Republic	+75 kg	~~130~~	130	135	2nd place, silver medalist(s)	170	175	179	1st place, gold medalist(s)	314	1st place, gold medalist(s)
2007	Chiang Mai, Thailand	+75 kg	130	135	138	1st place, gold medalist(s)	171	178	181	1st place, gold medalist(s)	319	1st place, gold medalist(s)
2009	Goyang, South Korea	+75 kg	~~131~~	131	136	2nd place, silver medalist(s)	~~174~~	174	187	1st place, gold medalist(s)	323	1st place, gold medalist(s)
2010	Antalya, Turkey	+75 kg	125	~~130~~	130	3rd place, bronze medalist(s)	167	176	179	2nd place, silver medalist(s)	309	3rd place, bronze medalist(s)
Asian Games
2002	Busan, South Korea	+75 kg	110	115	117.5	2	140	145	155	2	272.5	2nd place, silver medalist(s)
2006	Doha, Qatar	+75 kg	130	135	~~139~~	2	171	178	~~182~~	1	313	2nd place, silver medalist(s)
2010	Guangzhou, China	+75 kg	~~130~~	130	~~134~~	3	175	181	~~188~~	1	311	1st place, gold medalist(s)
Asian Championships
2012	Pyeongtaek, South Korea	+75 kg	116	120	125	1st place, gold medalist(s)	155	~~165~~	165	1st place, gold medalist(s)	290	1st place, gold medalist(s)
World Junior Championships
2001	Thessaloniki, Greece	+75 kg	~~105~~	105	110	3rd place, bronze medalist(s)	140	~~145~~	~~145~~	3rd place, bronze medalist(s)	250	3rd place, bronze medalist(s)
