= Cristina Cornejo (weightlifter) =

Peruvian weightlifter

Personal information
- Full name: Cristina Cornejo Scheelje
- Nationality: Peru
- Born: 9 June 1985 (age 41) Lima, Peru
- Height: 1.60 m (5 ft 3 in)
- Weight: 118 kg (260 lb)

Sport
- Sport: Weightlifting
- Event: +75 kg

Cristina Cornejo Scheelje (born June 9, 1985, in Lima) is a Peruvian weightlifter. Cornejo represented Peru at the 2008 Summer Olympics in Beijing, where she competed in the women's super heavyweight category (+75 kg). She placed tenth in this event, as she successfully lifted 97 kg in the single-motion snatch, and hoisted 128 kg in a two-part, shoulder-to-overhead clean and jerk, for a total of 225 kg.
