= Vasiliki Kasapi =

Greek weightlifter (born 1983)

Personal information
- Full name: Vasiliki Kasapi
- Born: 22 March 1983 (age 43) Thessaloniki, Greece
- Height: 173 cm (5 ft 8 in)
- Weight: 127.62 kg (281.4 lb)

Sport
- Country: Greece
- Sport: Weightlifting
- Weight class: +75 kg
- Club: AGE Thessaloniki
- Team: National team
- Updated on 8 September 2016

Vasiliki Kasapi (Original: Βασιλική Κασάπη, born 22 March 1983 in Thessaloniki) was a Greek female weightlifter, competing in the +75 kg category and representing Greece at international competitions.

She participated at the 2004 Summer Olympics in the +75 kg event. She competed at world championships, most recently at the 2007 World Weightlifting Championships.

She was caught and sanctioned for using the forbidden substances methyltrienolone and buprenorphine.

== Major results ==
Year	Venue	Weight	Snatch (kg)				Clean & Jerk (kg)				Total	Rank
Year	Venue	Weight	1	2	3	Rank	1	2	3	Rank	Total	Rank
Summer Olympics
2004	Athens, Greece	+75 kg										8
World Championships
2007	Chiang Mai, Thailand	+75 kg	115	120	~~122~~	5	138	141	144	7	264	6
2006	Santo Domingo, Dominican Republic	+75 kg	107	111	112	11	130	~~135~~	135	13	247.0	13
2005	Doha, Qatar	+75 kg	110	115	117	7	~~135~~	~~135~~	~~135~~	---	0.0	---
2003	Vancouver, Canada	+75 kg	112.5	~~117.5~~	117.5	8	137.5	~~142.5~~	142.5	10	260	9
2002	Warsaw, Poland	+75 kg	115	~~120~~	120	5	~~140~~	140	145	6	265	6
2001	Antalya, Turkey	+75 kg	102.5	107.5	112.5	6	130	~~137.5~~	~~137.5~~	9	242.5	8
