= Victoria Mavridou =

Greek weightlifter (born 1991)

Personal information
- Nationality: Greece
- Born: 8 July 1991 (age 34) Thessaloniki, Greece
- Height: 1.73 m (5 ft 8 in)
- Weight: 102 kg (225 lb)

Sport
- Sport: Weightlifting
- Event: +75 kg
- Club: Nemesis Stauroupolis

Victoria Mavridou (Greek: Βικτωρία Μαυρίδου; born 8 July 1991 in Thessaloniki) is a Greek weightlifter. At age seventeen, Mavridou made her official debut as the nation's lone female weightlifter for the 2008 Summer Olympics in Beijing, where she competed in the women's super heavyweight category (+75 kg). She placed ninth in this event, as she successfully lifted 105 kg in the single-motion snatch, and hoisted 126 kg in a two-part, shoulder-to-overhead clean and jerk, for a total of 231 kg.
