= Ganna Pustovarova =

Uzbekistani weightlifter (born 1993)

Personal information
- Full name: Ganna Pustovarova
- Born: 1993 (age 32–33)
- Weight: 101.29 kg (223.3 lb)

Sport
- Country: Uzbekistan
- Sport: Weightlifting
- Team: National team
- Updated on 6 September 2016

Ganna Pustovarova (born 1993) is an Uzbekistani weightlifter, competing in the +75 kg category and representing Uzbekistan in international competitions.

She competed at world championships, most recently at the 2010 World Weightlifting Championships.

== Major results ==
Year	Venue	Weight	Snatch (kg)				Clean & Jerk (kg)				Total	Rank
Year	Venue	Weight	1	2	3	Rank	1	2	3	Rank	Total	Rank
World Championships
2010	Antalya, Turkey	+75 kg	~~78~~	78	~~82~~	22	97	~~101~~	~~101~~	23	175	23
