= Weightlifting at the 2008 Summer Olympics – Women's +75 kg =

Women's +75 kg at the Games of the XXIX Olympiad
- Venue: Beihang University Gymnasium
- Date: 16 August 2008
- Competitors: 11 from 10 nations

Medalists
1st place, gold medalist(s)		Jang Mi-ran	South Korea
2nd place, silver medalist(s)		Ele Opeloge	Samoa
3rd place, bronze medalist(s)		Mariam Usman	Nigeria

The women's +75 kilograms weightlifting event was the heaviest women's event at the weightlifting competition, allowing competitors with over 75 kilograms of body mass. The competition took place on August 16, starting at 19:00.

Each lifter performed in both the snatch and clean and jerk lifts, with the final score being the sum of the lifter's best result in each. The athlete received three attempts in each of the two lifts; the score for the lift was the heaviest weight successfully lifted.

The winner of the event, Jang Mi-ran, broke three world records: the snatch (140 kg, +1 kg), the clean and jerk (186 kg, +4 kg) and the total (326 kg, +7 kg). With the disqualification of Olha Korobka and Mariya Grabovetskaya, Jang won the competition by 57kg, an Olympic record margin.

== Schedule ==
All times are China Standard Time (UTC+08:00)

Date	Time	Event
16 August 2008	19:00	Group A

== Records ==
Prior to this competition, the existing world and Olympic records were as follows.

World Record	Snatch	Mu Shuangshuang (CHN)	139 kg	Doha, Qatar	6 December 2006
World Record	Clean & Jerk	Tang Gonghong (CHN)	182 kg	Athens, Greece	21 August 2004
World Record	Total	Mu Shuangshuang (CHN)	319 kg	Chiang Mai, Thailand	26 September 2007
Olympic Record	Snatch	Ding Meiyuan (CHN)	135 kg	Sydney, Australia	22 September 2000
Olympic Record	Clean & Jerk	Tang Gonghong (CHN)	182 kg	Athens, Greece	21 August 2004
Olympic Record	Total	Tang Gonghong (CHN)	305 kg	Athens, Greece	21 August 2004

== Results ==
Rank	Athlete	Group	Body weight	Snatch (kg)				Clean & Jerk (kg)				Total
Rank	Athlete	Group	Body weight	1	2	3	Result	1	2	3	Result	Total
1st place, gold medalist(s)	Jang Mi-ran (KOR)	A	116.75	130	136	140	140	175	183	186	186	326
2nd place, silver medalist(s)	Ele Opeloge (SAM)	A	123.89	113	116	119	119	145	150	~~152~~	150	269
3rd place, bronze medalist(s)	Mariam Usman (NGR)	A	115.30	~~115~~	115	~~120~~	115	145	150	~~156~~	150	265
4	Cheryl Haworth (USA)	A	136.29	112	115	~~118~~	115	140	144	~~150~~	144	259
5	Yuliya Dovhal (UKR)	A	96.05	~~114~~	114	118	118	~~140~~	140	~~147~~	140	258
6	Deborah Lovely (AUS)	A	94.19	109	113	~~115~~	113	~~135~~	135	~~140~~	135	248
7	Victoria Mavridou (GRE)	A	102.15	100	105	~~110~~	105	121	126	~~128~~	126	231
8	Cristina Cornejo (PER)	A	117.50	93	97	~~99~~	97	123	128	~~130~~	128	225
—	Eva Dimas (ESA)	A	86.85	100	~~105~~	105	105	~~125~~	~~127~~	~~127~~	—	—
DQ	Olha Korobka (UKR)	A	166.97	120	124	~~127~~	124	150	153	—	153	~~277~~
DQ	Mariya Grabovetskaya (KAZ)	A	112.93	~~115~~	115	120	120	145	~~150~~	150	150	~~270~~

- Olha Korobka of Ukraine and Mariya Grabovetskaya of Kazakhstan originally finished second and third, respectively. But were both disqualified after they tested positive for dehydrochlormethyltestosterone and Oxandrolone.

== New records ==
Snatch	136 kg	Jang Mi-ran (KOR)	OR
Snatch	140 kg	Jang Mi-ran (KOR)	WR
Clean & Jerk	183 kg	Jang Mi-ran (KOR)	WR
Clean & Jerk	186 kg	Jang Mi-ran (KOR)	WR
Total	315 kg	Jang Mi-ran (KOR)	OR
Total	323 kg	Jang Mi-ran (KOR)	WR
Total	326 kg	Jang Mi-ran (KOR)	WR
