= 2009 World Weightlifting Championships – Women's +75 kg =

The women's competition in the super-heavyweight (+75 kg) division was staged on November 28, 2009.

== Schedule ==
Date	Time	Event
28 November 2009	13:00	Group B
28 November 2009	19:00	Group A

== Medalists ==
Event	Gold		Silver		Bronze	
Snatch	Tatiana Kashirina (RUS)	138 kg	Jang Mi-ran (KOR)	136 kg	Meng Suping (CHN)	131 kg
Clean & Jerk	Jang Mi-ran (KOR)	187 kg	Tatiana Kashirina (RUS)	165 kg	Meng Suping (CHN)	165 kg
Total	Jang Mi-ran (KOR)	323 kg	Tatiana Kashirina (RUS)	303 kg	Meng Suping (CHN)	296 kg

== Records ==
Prior to this competition, the existing world records were as follows.

World Record	Snatch	Jang Mi-ran (KOR)	140 kg	Beijing, China	16 August 2008
World Record	Clean & Jerk	Jang Mi-ran (KOR)	186 kg	Beijing, China	16 August 2008
World Record	Total	Jang Mi-ran (KOR)	326 kg	Beijing, China	16 August 2008

== Results ==
Rank	Athlete	Group	Body weight	Snatch (kg)				Clean & Jerk (kg)				Total
Rank	Athlete	Group	Body weight	1	2	3	Rank	1	2	3	Rank	Total
1st place, gold medalist(s)	Jang Mi-ran (KOR)	A	115.04	~~131~~	131	136	2nd place, silver medalist(s)	~~174~~	174	187	1st place, gold medalist(s)	323
2nd place, silver medalist(s)	Tatiana Kashirina (RUS)	A	90.90	130	135	138	1st place, gold medalist(s)	160	165	~~168~~	2nd place, silver medalist(s)	303
3rd place, bronze medalist(s)	Meng Suping (CHN)	A	113.95	125	131	~~135~~	3rd place, bronze medalist(s)	165	~~173~~	~~173~~	3rd place, bronze medalist(s)	296
4	Ele Opeloge (SAM)	A	122.32	~~120~~	120	~~126~~	4	~~145~~	~~145~~	145	4	265
5	Mariam Usman (NGR)	A	126.16	105	110	115	6	135	~~140~~	145	5	260
6	Lee Hui-sol (KOR)	A	115.89	110	~~115~~	~~121~~	8	140	~~150~~	~~150~~	6	250
7	Yuliya Dovhal (UKR)	A	90.24	110	~~114~~	~~115~~	7	130	134	~~136~~	8	244
8	Afaf Ibrahim (EGY)	A	97.33	~~100~~	100	105	11	135	~~140~~	~~140~~	7	240
9	Ümmühan Gürçay (TUR)	B	89.65	98	103	106	9	129	~~133~~	133	9	239
10	Kathleen Schöppe (GER)	B	93.37	99	103	105	10	~~128~~	128	132	11	237
11	Sarah Robles (USA)	B	120.83	~~97~~	97	100	14	128	133	~~138~~	10	233
12	Tania Silva (MEX)	B	103.15	98	102	~~104~~	13	~~125~~	125	130	12	232
13	Hadiza Zakari (NGR)	B	81.77	95	100	103	12	115	120	125	13	228
14	Tania Mascorro (MEX)	B	103.07	98	~~103~~	~~104~~	15	~~125~~	125	~~131~~	14	223
15	Sabina Bagińska (POL)	B	99.45	92	~~96~~	96	19	115	120	122	15	218
16	María Carvajal (DOM)	B	82.28	93	97	~~100~~	16	115	~~120~~	120	16	217
17	Annarosa Campaldini (ITA)	B	97.04	91	95	97	17	116	~~121~~	~~121~~	18	213
18	Sibel Altındaş (TUR)	B	82.82	85	~~90~~	92	20	105	115	117	17	209
19	Krisztina Magát (HUN)	B	105.42	90	95	97	18	110	~~115~~	~~116~~	19	207
—	Nahla Ramadan (EGY)	A	97.01	115	~~118~~	118	5	~~140~~	—	—	—	—

== New records ==
Clean & Jerk	187 kg	Jang Mi-ran (KOR)	WR
