= Meng Suping =

Chinese weightlifter (born 1989)

Personal information
- Nationality: Chinese
- Born: 17 July 1989 (age 36) Ma'anshan, China
- Height: 1.73 m (5 ft 8 in)
- Weight: 120.65 kg (266 lb)

Sport
- Country: China
- Sport: Weightlifting
- Event: +87 kg
- Club: Anhui Province
Medal record
Women's weightlifting
Representing China
Olympic Games
Gold medal – first place	2016 Rio de Janeiro	+75 kg
World Championships
Bronze medal – third place	2009 Goyang	+75 kg
Silver medal – second place	2010 Antalya	+75 kg
Silver medal – second place	2014 Almaty	+75 kg
Silver medal – second place	2015 Houston	+75 kg
Silver medal – second place	2018 Ashgabat	+87 kg
Bronze medal – third place	2019 Pattaya	+87 kg
Asian Games
Silver medal – second place	2010 Guangzhou	+75 kg
Asian Championships
Gold medal – first place	2011 Tongling	+75 kg
Gold medal – first place	2015 Phuket	+75 kg
Silver medal – second place	2019 Ningbo	+87 kg
National Games of China
Silver medal – second place	2013 Liaoning	+75 kg
Gold medal – first place	2017 Tianjin	+75 kg
Silver medal – second place	2021 Shaanxi	+87 kg

Meng Suping (Chinese: 孟苏平; born 17 July 1989) is a Chinese weightlifter. She competes in the women's super heavyweight category of +75 kg and is an Olympic champion and multiple world medalist.

At the 2012 World University Championships she set a world record in the clean & jerk with a result of 188 kg.

She took first place during the 2016 Olympics in Rio de Janeiro with 130 kg on snatch and 177 kg on clean & jerk, with a combined weight of 307 kg.

== Major results ==
Year	Venue	Weight	Snatch (kg)				Clean & Jerk (kg)				Total	Rank
Year	Venue	Weight	1	2	3	Rank	1	2	3	Rank	Total	Rank
Olympic Games
2016	Rio de Janeiro, Brazil	+75 kg	~~125~~	125	130	2	~~175~~	175	177	1	307	1st place, gold medalist(s)
World Championships
2009	Goyang, South Korea	+75 kg	125	131	~~135~~	3rd place, bronze medalist(s)	165	~~173~~	~~173~~	3rd place, bronze medalist(s)	296	3rd place, bronze medalist(s)
2010	Antalya, Turkey	+75 kg	120	126	131	2nd place, silver medalist(s)	165	177	179	1st place, gold medalist(s)	310	2nd place, silver medalist(s)
