= Tatsiana Hramyka =

Belarusian weightlifter

Tatsiana Hramyka (born April 4, 1986) is a Belarusian female weightlifter. She competed in the women's +75 kg category in the Strasbourg 2007 European Weightlifting Championships, placing fourth.
