= Sioe Haioti =

Niuean weightlifter

Personal information
- Born: March 31, 1985 (age 39)

Sport
- Country: Niue
- Sport: Weightlifting

Sioe Haioti, born March 31, 1985 is a Niuean weightlifter.

Haioti competed in the 2006 Commonwealth Games. She placed fifth in the Women's 75 kg+ Combined by lifting 214 kg.

Haioti also took part in the 2005 Weightlifting World Championships.
