= Irina Nekrassova =

Kazakhstani weightlifter (born 1988)

Personal information
- Native name: Ирина Сергеевна Некрасова
- Nationality: Kazakh
- Born: 1 March 1988 (age 38)
- Years active: 2007–present
- Height: 1.68 m (5 ft 6 in)

Sport
- Sport: Weightlifting

Irina Nekrassova (born 1 March 1988) is a female weightlifter from Kazakhstan.

== Career ==
At the 2007 World Weightlifting Championships she ranked 9th in the 69 kg category, lifting 228 kg in total.

She initially won the silver medal in the 63 kg category at the 2008 Summer Olympics, with 240 kg in total. On 17 November 2016 the IOC disqualified her from the 2008 Olympic Games, stripped her Olympic medal and struck her results from the record for failing a drugs test in a re-analysis of her doping sample from 2008.
