= Mami Shimamoto =

Japanese weightlifter

Personal information
- Born: September 24, 1987 (age 38)
- Height: 1.65 m (5 ft 5 in)
- Weight: 103 kg (227 lb)

Sport
- Country: Japan
- Sport: Weightlifting

Mami Shimamoto (Japanese: 嶋本 麻美; born 24 September 1987 in Wakayama, Japan) is a Japanese weightlifter. She competed for Japan at the 2012 Summer Olympics. Shimamoto was ninth-placed in the event.
