= Alexandra Aborneva =

Kazakhstani weightlifter (born 1986)

Personal information
- Born: 30 October 1986 (age 39)
- Weight: 107.58 kg (237.2 lb)

Sport
- Country: Kazakhstan
- Sport: Weightlifting
- Team: National Team
- Updated on 31 August 2016

Alexandra Aborneva (born 30 October 1986) is a Kazakhstani weightlifter, competing in the +75 kg category and representing Kazakhstan at international competitions. She competed at world championships, including at the 2015 World Weightlifting Championships. In 2013 Aborneva had a total of 3 gold medals revoked after she tested positive for banned performance-enhancing drugs.

== Major results ==
Year	Venue	Weight	Snatch (kg)				Clean & Jerk (kg)				Total	Rank
Year	Venue	Weight	1	2	3	Rank	1	2	3	Rank	Total	Rank
World Championships
2015	Houston, United States	+75 kg	107	112	117	12	140	150	~~155~~	8	267	8
2011	Paris, France	+75 kg	105	110	~~115~~	10	141	147	150	4	260	5
2010	Antalya, Turkey	+75 kg	113	~~117~~	~~120~~	6	145	147	~~155~~	6	260	5
2007	Chiang Mai, Thailand	+75 kg	107	112	115	9	142	147	149	5	264	5
2006	Santo Domingo, Dominican Republic	+75 kg	105	110	~~115~~	12	140	147	~~150~~	5	257.0	5
2005	Doha, Qatar	+75 kg	100	~~105~~	~~106~~	12	130	135	~~140~~	8	235.0	11
