= Olha Korobka =

Ukrainian weightlifter (born 1985)

Medal record

Women's Weightlifting

Representing Ukraine

Olympic Games
Disqualified	2008 Beijing	+75 kg

World Championships
Bronze medal – third place	2003 Vancouver	+75 kg
Bronze medal – third place	2006 Santo Domingo	+75 kg
Bronze medal – third place	2007 Chiang Mai	+75 kg
Disqualified	2011 Paris	+75 kg

European Championships
Gold medal – first place	2006 Władysławowo	+75 kg
Gold medal – first place	2007 Strasbourg	+75 kg
Gold medal – first place	2008 Lignano Sabbiadoro	+75 kg
Disqualified	2010 Minsk	+75 kg

Olha Vasylivna Korobka (Ukrainian: Ольга Василівна Коробка; born December 7, 1985 Bobrovytsia, Ukrainian SSR, Soviet Union) is a Ukrainian weightlifter who was the European record holder in the snatch with 133 kg, and in the clean and jerk with 164 kg.

== Career ==
Korobka ranked 7th in the women's over 75 kg category at the 2004 Summer Olympics.

On April 18, 2008, Korobka won her third straight European championship overall title in the women's over 75 kg category by lifting 277 kg in total (127 kg in the snatch, 150 kg in the clean and jerk).

At the 2008 Summer Olympics she initially won the silver medal in the +75 kg category, with a total of 277 kg. At a height of 1.81 m (5 ft 11 in) and weighing 167 kg (368 lb), she was the heaviest female competitor at the Games.

Korobka won silver medal as superweight in the 2010 European Championship, at a bodyweight of 170 kg (370 lb). In February 2012, she was banned for four years, until November 2015, for doping. She had failed a drug test after the 2011 World Weightlifting Championships, where she won three bronze medals.

In 2016, she was stripped of her 2008 Olympic medal after reanalysis of her sample tested positive for steroids.
