= Mariya Grabovetskaya =

Kazakhstani weightlifter (born 1987)

Medal record

Women's weightlifting

Representing Kazakhstan

Asian Games
Silver medal – second place	2014 Incheon	+75 kg
Bronze medal – third place	2010 Guangzhou	+75 kg

Olympic Games
Disqualified	2008 Beijing	+75 kg

Asian Championships
Gold medal – first place	2005 Dubai	+75 kg

Mariya Grabovetskaya (born 10 April 1987) is a female weightlifter from Kokshetau, Kazakhstan.

== Career ==
She won the silver medal at the 2007 Junior World Championships, with a total of 277 kg.

At the 2008 Summer Olympics she initially won the bronze medal in the +75 kg category, with a total of 270 kg. On 17 November 2016 the IOC disqualified her from the 2008 Olympic Games, stripped her Olympic medal and struck her results from the record for failing a drugs test in a re-analysis of her doping sample from 2008.
