= Mu Shuangshuang =

Chinese weightlifter (born 1984)

Medal record

Women's weightlifting

Representing China

World Championships
Silver medal – second place	2005 Doha	+75 kg
Silver medal – second place	2006 Santo Domingo	+75 kg
Silver medal – second place	2007 Chiang Mai	+75 kg

Mu Shuangshuang (穆爽爽; born July 7, 1984) is a Chinese weightlifter from Shuangliao, Jilin. She competes in the over-75 kg category.

In 2005, 2006, and 2007 she won the silver medal in World Weightlifting Championships.

On 6 December 2006 she set a new world record of 139 kg for the snatch at the World Championship in Doha and on 26 September 2007 she set a new overall world record of 319 kg at the World Championship in Chiang Mai, Thailand.

She was not selected to compete in the 2008 Olympic Games.
