= Weightlifting at the 2015 Pacific Games =

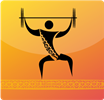
- Weightlifting pictogram for the Games
- Venue: Sir John Guise Indoor Stadium
- Location: Port Moresby, Papua New Guinea
- Dates: 5–8 July 2015

Weightlifting at the 2015 Pacific Games in Port Moresby, Papua New Guinea was held on July 5–8, 2015.

The event was also designated the 2015 Oceania Senior, Junior & Youth Championships, meaning the same competitor could earn up to 4 medals for the same result (totals only).

== Medal summary ==
=== Medal table (Pacific Games) ===
* Host nation (Papua New Guinea)

Rank	Nation	Gold	Silver	Bronze	Total
1	Papua New Guinea*	13	5	3	21
2	Samoa	11	12	0	23
3	Australia	6	15	8	29
4	Fiji	4	4	6	14
5	Solomon Islands	3	2	4	9
6	Nauru	3	2	1	6
7	Kiribati	3	0	2	5
8	Micronesia	2	1	0	3
9	New Zealand	0	4	9	13
10	Marshall Islands	0	0	4	4
11	American Samoa	0	0	3	3
11	Cook Islands	0	0	3	3
13	Guam	0	0	1	1
13	Palau	0	0	1	1
Totals (14 entries)		45	45	45	135

=== Medal table (Oceania Senior Championships) ===
Medals were awarded for totals only.

* Host nation (Papua New Guinea)

Rank	Nation	Gold	Silver	Bronze	Total
1	Papua New Guinea*	5	1	0	6
2	Samoa	3	5	0	8
3	Australia	2	5	3	10
4	Fiji	1	1	3	5
5	Solomon Islands	1	1	1	3
6	Nauru	1	1	0	2
7	Kiribati	1	0	1	2
8	Micronesia	1	0	0	1
9	New Zealand	0	1	4	5
10	American Samoa	0	0	1	1
10	Cook Islands	0	0	1	1
10	Marshall Islands	0	0	1	1
Totals (12 entries)		15	15	15	45

Results shown below are attributed to the Pacific Games and (totals only) Oceania Senior Championships. Oceania Junior and Youth results cited here and here respectively.

=== Men's results ===
Event	Gold		Silver		Bronze		Refs
56 kg Snatch	Manueli Tulo; Fiji	107 kg	Elson Brechtefield; Nauru	100 kg	Poama Qaqa; Fiji	92 kg	
56 kg Clean & Jerk	Manueli Tulo; Fiji	127 kg	Poama Qaqa; Fiji	121 kg	Elson Brechtefield; Nauru	120 kg	
56 kg Total	Manueli Tulo; Fiji	234 kg	Elson Brechtefield; Nauru	220 kg	Poama Qaqa; Fiji	213 kg	
62 kg Snatch	Morea Baru; Papua New Guinea	121 kg	Vaipava Nevo Ioane; Samoa	115 kg	Ramoaka Brown; Solomon Islands	95 kg	
62 kg Clean & Jerk	Vaipava Nevo Ioane; Samoa	156 kg	Morea Baru; Papua New Guinea	155 kg	Ramoaka Brown; Solomon Islands	120 kg	
62 kg Total	Morea Baru; Papua New Guinea	276 kg	Vaipava Nevo Ioane; Samoa	271 kg	Ramoaka Brown; Solomon Islands	215 kg	
69 kg Snatch	Manuel Minginfel; Micronesia	120 kg	Patrick Pasia; Samoa	116 kg	Stevick Patris; Palau	115 kg	
69 kg Clean & Jerk	Tevita Tawai; Fiji	157 kg	Manuel Minginfel; Micronesia	156 kg	Fred Karoho Oala; Papua New Guinea	154 kg	
69 kg Total	Manuel Minginfel; Micronesia	276 kg	Patrick Pasia; Samoa	268 kg	Tevita Tawai; Fiji	267 kg	
77 kg Snatch	Francois Etoundi; Australia	135 kg	Toua Udia; Papua New Guinea	130 kg	Mitchell Delbridge; Australia	125 kg	
77 kg Clean & Jerk	Toua Udia; Papua New Guinea	172 kg	Francois Etoundi; Australia	166 kg	Taretita Tabaroua; Kiribati	155 kg	
77 kg Total	Toua Udia; Papua New Guinea	302 kg	Francois Etoundi; Australia	301 kg	Taretita Tabaroua; Kiribati	272 kg	
85 kg Snatch	Malek Chamoun; Australia	139 kg	Petunu Opeloge; Samoa	138 kg	Liam Larkins; Australia	126 kg	
85 kg Clean & Jerk	Petunu Opeloge; Samoa	173 kg	Malek Chamoun; Australia	172 kg	Kabuati Bob; Marshall Islands	162 kg	
85 kg Total	Petunu Opeloge; Samoa	311 kg	Malek Chamoun; Australia	311 kg	Liam Larkins; Australia	284 kg	
94 kg Snatch	Siaosi Leuo; Samoa	150 kg	Steven Kari; Papua New Guinea	140 kg	Tanumafili Jungblut; American Samoa	132 kg	
94 kg Clean & Jerk	Steven Kari; Papua New Guinea	204 kg	Siaosi Leuo; Samoa	193 kg	Tanumafili Jungblut; American Samoa	155 kg	
94 kg Total	Steven Kari; Papua New Guinea	344 kg	Siaosi Leuo; Samoa	343 kg	Tanumafili Jungblut; American Samoa	287 kg	
105 kg Snatch	David Katoatau; Kiribati	141 kg	Zac Grgurevic; Australia	141 kg	Rory Taylor; New Zealand	139 kg	
105 kg Clean & Jerk	David Katoatau; Kiribati	200 kg	Rory Taylor; New Zealand	178 kg	Zac Grgurevic; Australia	176 kg	
105 kg Total	David Katoatau; Kiribati	341 kg	Zac Grgurevic; Australia	317 kg	Rory Taylor; New Zealand	317 kg	
+105 kg Snatch	Itte Detenamo; Nauru	167 kg	Lauititi Lui; Samoa	160 kg	Andrius Barakauskas; New Zealand	145 kg	
+105 kg Clean & Jerk	Itte Detenamo; Nauru	203 kg	Lauititi Lui; Samoa	202 kg	David Liti; New Zealand	181 kg	
+105 kg Total	Itte Detenamo; Nauru	370 kg	Lauititi Lui; Samoa	362 kg	David Liti; New Zealand	321 kg	

=== Women's results ===
Event	Gold		Silver		Bronze		Refs
48 kg Snatch	Thelma Mea Toua; Papua New Guinea	70 kg	Mary Barter; Australia	59 kg	Seruwaia Malani; Fiji	58 kg	
48 kg Clean & Jerk	Thelma Mea Toua; Papua New Guinea	90 kg	Mary Barter; Australia	75 kg	Seruwaia Malani; Fiji	70 kg	
48 kg Total	Thelma Mea Toua; Papua New Guinea	160 kg	Mary Barter; Australia	134 kg	Seruwaia Malani; Fiji	128 kg	
53 kg Snatch	Erika Yamasaki; Australia	82 kg	Mary Kini Lifu; Solomon Islands	63 kg	Kimberly Taguacta; Guam	62 kg	
53 kg Clean & Jerk	Dika Toua; Papua New Guinea	110 kg	Erika Yamasaki; Australia	97 kg	Mary Kini Lifu; Solomon Islands	85 kg	
53 kg Total	Erika Yamasaki; Australia	179 kg	Mary Kini Lifu; Solomon Islands	148 kg	Charlotte Moss; New Zealand	129 kg	
58 kg Snatch	Jenly Tegu Wini; Solomon Islands	83 kg	Tia-Clair Toomey; Australia	76 kg	Mathlynn Robert-Sasser; Marshall Islands	75 kg	
58 kg Clean & Jerk	Jenly Tegu Wini; Solomon Islands	110 kg	Tia-Clair Toomey; Australia	98 kg	Mathlynn Robert-Sasser; Marshall Islands	97 kg	
58 kg Total	Jenly Tegu Wini; Solomon Islands	193 kg	Tia-Clair Toomey; Australia	174 kg	Mathlynn Robert-Sasser; Marshall Islands	172 kg	
63 kg Snatch	Philippa Malone; Australia	86 kg	Kiana Elliott; Australia	83 kg	Sandra Ako; Papua New Guinea	80 kg	
63 kg Clean & Jerk	Sandra Ako; Papua New Guinea	103 kg	Philippa Malone; Australia	102 kg	Kiana Elliott; Australia	98 kg	
63 kg Total	Philippa Malone; Australia	188 kg	Sandra Ako; Papua New Guinea	183 kg	Kiana Elliott; Australia	181 kg	
69 kg Snatch	Guba Hale; Papua New Guinea	83 kg	Vanessa Lui; Samoa	82 kg	Ruth Horrell; New Zealand	76 kg	
69 kg Clean & Jerk	Vanessa Lui; Samoa	105 kg	Guba Hale; Papua New Guinea	105 kg	Ruth Horrell; New Zealand	100 kg	
69 kg Total	Guba Hale; Papua New Guinea	188 kg	Vanessa Lui; Samoa	187 kg	Ruth Horrell; New Zealand	176 kg	
75 kg Snatch	Mary Opeloge; Samoa	106 kg	Apolonia Vaivai; Fiji	94 kg	Eden Kambi; Papua New Guinea	83 kg	
75 kg Clean & Jerk	Mary Opeloge; Samoa	125 kg	Apolonia Vaivai; Fiji	110 kg	Camilla Fogagnolo; Australia	101 kg	
75 kg Total	Mary Opeloge; Samoa	231 kg	Apolonia Vaivai; Fiji	204 kg	Camilla Fogagnolo; Australia	183 kg	
+75 kg Snatch	Ele Opeloge; Samoa	113 kg	Tracey Lambrechs; New Zealand	98 kg	Luisa Peters; Cook Islands	94 kg	
+75 kg Clean & Jerk	Ele Opeloge; Samoa	131 kg	Tracey Lambrechs; New Zealand	125 kg	Luisa Peters; Cook Islands	113 kg	
+75 kg Total	Ele Opeloge; Samoa	244 kg	Tracey Lambrechs; New Zealand	223 kg	Luisa Peters; Cook Islands	207 kg	

== See also ==
- Weightlifting at the Pacific Games
