= Touch rugby at the 2019 Pacific Games – Mixed tournament =

Mixed Touch rugby at the 2019 Pacific Games
- Venue: St Joseph's Sports Field
- Location: Apia, Samoa
- Dates: 18–20 July 2019
- Teams: 6

Medalists
gold medal	Papua New Guinea
silver medal	Samoa
bronze medal	Cook Islands

The Mixed touch rugby tournament at the 2019 Pacific Games was held in Apia from 18 to 20 July 2019 at the St Joseph's Sports Field.

== Participating teams ==
Six Pacific Games Associations qualified for this tournament.

- Cook Islands (14)
- Fiji (14)
- Papua New Guinea (14)
- Samoa (14) (Host)
- Solomon Islands (14)
- Tonga (14)

== Round robin ==
Pos	Team	Pld	W	D	L	PF	PA	PD	Pts	Qualification
1	Papua New Guinea	5	5	0	0	70	28	+42	15	Semi-finals
2	Samoa	5	4	0	1	52	29	+23	13	Semi-finals
3	Cook Islands	5	3	0	2	47	29	+18	11	Semi-finals
4	Fiji	5	2	0	3	39	35	+4	9	Semi-finals
5	Tonga	5	1	0	4	32	51	−19	7	5th/6th-place play-off
6	Solomon Islands	5	0	0	5	13	81	−68	5	5th/6th-place play-off

=== Day 1 ===
18 July 2019
08:30

Fiji	4–7	Samoa

St Joseph's Sports Field

18 July 2019
09:20

Cook Islands	12–4	Tonga

St Joseph's Sports Field

18 July 2019
10:10

Solomon Islands	2–18	Papua New Guinea

St Joseph's Sports Field

18 July 2019
11:50

Fiji	3–8	Cook Islands

St Joseph's Sports Field

18 July 2019
12:40

Solomon Islands	2–16	Samoa

St Joseph's Sports Field

18 July 2019
13:30

Papua New Guinea	14–6	Tonga

St Joseph's Sports Field

18 July 2019
16:00

Fiji	18–3	Solomon Islands

St Joseph's Sports Field

18 July 2019
16:00

Papua New Guinea	13–5	Cook Islands

St Joseph's Sports Field

18 July 2019
16:50

Tonga	4–11	Samoa

St Joseph's Sports Field

=== Day 2 ===
19 July 2019
09:20

Fiji	3–11	Papua New Guinea

St Joseph's Sports Field

19 July 2019
10:10

Tonga	12–3	Solomon Islands

St Joseph's Sports Field

19 July 2019
10:10

Samoa	6–5	Cook Islands

St Joseph's Sports Field

19 July 2019
12:40

Samoa	12–14	Papua New Guinea

St Joseph's Sports Field

19 July 2019
12:40

Cook Islands	17–3	Solomon Islands

St Joseph's Sports Field

19 July 2019
13:30

Fiji	11–6	Tonga

St Joseph's Sports Field

== Finals ==
Semi-final 1

19 July 2019
16:00

Papua New Guinea	9–5	Fiji

St Joseph's Sports Field

Semi-final 2

19 July 2019
16:00

Samoa	8–7	Cook Islands

St Joseph's Sports Field

== Playoffs ==
5th/6th playoff

20 July 2019
09:20

Tonga	0–0 (Cancelled)	Solomon Islands

St Joseph's Sports Field

Bronze medal match

20 July 2019
10:10

Cook Islands	10–7	Fiji

St Joseph's Sports Field

Gold medal match

20 July 2019
11:00

Samoa	9–10	Papua New Guinea

St Joseph's Sports Field

== See also ==
- Touch rugby at the 2019 Pacific Games – Men's tournament
- Touch rugby at the 2019 Pacific Games – Women's tournament
