= Touch rugby at the 2015 Pacific Games – Mixed tournament =

The Mixed touch rugby tournament at the 2015 Pacific Games was held in Port Moresby from 8 to 10 July 2015 at the Bisini Touch Football Fields. Samoa won the gold medal, defeating hosts Papua New Guinea by 9–7 in the final. Tonga took the bronze medal defeating the Cook Islands by 10–3 in the third place play-off.

== Participants ==
Five teams played in the tournament:

- Cook Islands
- Kiribati
- Papua New Guinea
- Samoa
- Tonga

== Format ==
The teams played a round-robin followed by semifinals and play-offs for the medals.

== Preliminary round ==
Teams	Pld	W	D	L	PF	PA	+/−
Papua New Guinea	4	3	1	0	56	10	+46
Samoa	4	3	1	0	51	17	+34
Cook Islands	4	2	0	2	31	29	+2
Tonga	4	1	0	3	18	49	-31
Kiribati	4	0	0	4	10	62	-52
Updated: 11 July 2015 • Teams ranked 1 to 4 (Green background) advanced to the semifinals.

=== Day 1 ===
8 July 2015
13:00

Cook Islands	13–3	Kiribati

Bisini Touch Football Fields

8 July 2015
14:00

Samoa	14–3	Tonga

Bisini Touch Football Fields

8 July 2015
15:00

Kiribati	1–19	Papua New Guinea

Bisini Touch Football Fields

=== Day 2 ===
9 July 2015
09:00

Cook Islands	6–10	Samoa

Bisini Touch Football Fields

9 July 2015
10:00

Papua New Guinea	18–1	Tonga

Bisini Touch Football Fields

9 July 2015
11:00

Kiribati	1–20	Samoa

Bisini Touch Football Fields

9 July 2015
13:00

Cook Islands	11–4	Tonga

Bisini Touch Football Fields

9 July 2015
14:00

Papua New Guinea	7–7	Samoa

Bisini Touch Football Fields

=== Day 3 ===
10 July 2015
09:00

Cook Islands	1–12	Papua New Guinea

Bisini Touch Football Fields

10 July 2015
10:00

Kiribati	5–10	Tonga

Bisini Touch Football Fields

== Finals ==
=== Semifinals ===
10 July 2015
12:00

Papua New Guinea	18–1	Tonga

Bisini Touch Football Fields

10 July 2015
12:00

Samoa	11–6	Cook Islands

Bisini Touch Football Fields

=== Bronze final ===
10 July 2015
14:00

Cook Islands	10–3	Tonga

Bisini Touch Football Fields

=== Gold final ===
10 July 2015
15:00

Papua New Guinea	7–9	Samoa

Bisini Touch Football Fields

== See also ==
- Touch rugby at the Pacific Games
- Touch rugby at the 2015 Pacific Games – Women's tournament
- Touch rugby at the 2015 Pacific Games – Men's tournament
