= Touch rugby at the Pacific Games =

Touch rugby was introduced to the Pacific Games in 2003 at Suva in Fiji. It is an optional sport for the Pacific Games program, and the tournaments include men's, women's and mixed competitions. The first touch rugby tournament at the Pacific Mini Games was played in the Cook Islands in 2009.

== Men's summaries ==
Year	Host	Final			Bronze medal match			Ref
Year	Host	Gold medal	Score	Silver medal	Bronze medal	Score	Fourth place	Ref
2003	(Fiji); Suva	Fiji	6–5	Papua New Guinea	Samoa	medal playoffs	Tuvalu
2007	(Samoa); Apia	Fiji	6–4	Samoa	Papua New Guinea	5–4	Cook Islands
2015	(Papua New Guinea); Port Moresby	Papua New Guinea	8–7	Samoa	Cook Islands	18–4	Solomon Islands
2019	(Samoa); Apia	Papua New Guinea	12–11	Samoa	Fiji	9–6	Cook Islands
2023	(Solomon Islands); Honiara		–			–

== Women's summaries ==
Year	Host	Final			Bronze medal match			Ref
Year	Host	Gold medal	Score	Silver medal	Bronze medal	Score	Fourth place	Ref
2003	(Fiji); Suva	No women's competition on programme
2007	(Samoa); Apia	Cook Islands	4–1	Samoa	Papua New Guinea	7–6	Niue
2015	(Papua New Guinea); Port Moresby	Papua New Guinea	6–2	Samoa	Cook Islands	11–2	Kiribati
2019	(Samoa); Apia	Papua New Guinea	9–4	Samoa	Fiji	6–5	Cook Islands
2023	(Solomon Islands); Honiara		–			–

== Mixed tournament ==
Year	Host	Final			Bronze medal match			Ref
Year	Host	Gold medal	Score	Silver medal	Bronze medal	Score	Fourth place	Ref
2003	(Fiji); Suva	Fiji	9–8	Cook Islands	Samoa	medal playoffs	Niue
2007	(Samoa); Apia	Samoa	7–6	Cook Islands	Papua New Guinea	5–4	Niue
2015	(Papua New Guinea); Port Moresby	Samoa	9–7	Papua New Guinea	Cook Islands	10–3	Tonga
2019	(Samoa); Apia	Papua New Guinea	10–9	Samoa	Cook Islands	10–7	Fiji
2023	(Solomon Islands); Honiara		–			–

== Medal table ==
Rank	Nation	Gold	Silver	Bronze	Total
1	Papua New Guinea (PNG)	5	2	3	10
2	Fiji (FIJ)	3	0	2	5
3	Samoa (SAM)	2	7	2	11
4	Cook Islands (COK)	1	2	4	7
Totals (4 entries)		11	11	11	33

== Pacific Mini Games ==
Men's

Year	Host	Final			Bronze medal match			Ref
Year	Host	Gold medal	Score	Silver medal	Bronze medal	Score	Fourth place	Ref
2009	(Cook Islands); Rarotonga	Cook Islands	9–4	Fiji	Samoa

Women's

Year	Host	Final			Bronze medal match			Ref
Year	Host	Gold medal	Score	Silver medal	Bronze medal	Score	Fourth place	Ref
2009	(Cook Islands); Rarotonga	Samoa	5–4	Cook Islands	Niue

Mixed

Year	Host	Final			Bronze medal match			Ref
Year	Host	Gold medal	Score	Silver medal	Bronze medal	Score	Fourth place	Ref
2009	(Cook Islands); Rarotonga	Cook Islands	8–7 (a.e.t.)	Fiji	Papua New Guinea
