= Touch rugby at the 2019 Pacific Games =

- Venue: St Joseph's Sports Field
- Location: Apia, Samoa
- Dates: 15–20 July 2019

Touch rugby at the 2019 Pacific Games was played from 15–20 July 2019 at St Joseph's Sports Field in Samoa. In the men's tournament, Papua New Guinea won the gold medal, defeating Samoa in the final by 12–11. For the women, Papua New Guinea won the gold medal, defeating Samoa by 9–4. In the mixed tournament, Papua New Guinea won the gold medal, defeating Samoa in the final by 10–9.

== Medal summary ==
=== Medal table ===
Rank	Nation	Gold	Silver	Bronze	Total
1	Papua New Guinea	3	0	0	3
2	Samoa	0	3	0	3
3	Fiji	0	0	2	2
4	Cook Islands	0	0	1	1
Totals (4 entries)		3	3	3	9

=== Results ===
Event	Gold	Silver	Bronze
Men	Papua New Guinea; Junior Hoki; Kele Lessy; Francis Alu; Bobby Vavona; Andrew Turlom; Marlon Steven; Benny Nelson; Kere Mavia; Freddy Gelam; Ravu Ravu; Farapo Makura; Eugene Eka; Elison Waluka; Paul Matuta	Samoa; Michael Rasmussen; Arran Rogers; Darren Aofia; George Komiti; Pelenise Lima; Tasipale Cordtz; Eteuati Togiatoamai; Jedidiah Fagasua; Gregory Hazelman; Samoaautasu Tolovaa; Lafaele Leuta-Malo; Raymond Schuster; Peter Hazelman; Peter Togagae	Fiji; Semisi Rareba; Rusiate Uluimoala; Roko Rabici; Samuel a Marayawa; Pita Waqa; Savenaca Vocea; Johansen Nauluvula; Robert Chan; Victor Balenaivalu; Ro Veceli Mataitini; Jalesi Young; John Sade; Tevita Kabakoro; Gerard Young
Women	Papua New Guinea; Emmalyne John; Mangai Elomi; Bessie Peter; Maria Alu; Grace Kouba; Angelena Watego; Nadya Taubuso; Pauline Arazi; Natalie Kuper; Joylyn Tikot; Georgina Genaka; Angela Geno; Kelly Peter	Samoa; Siniva Williams; Etevise Vaifale; Christianna Perriman; Samantha Rogers; Jayde Afele; Mandria Sua; Filoi Eneliko; Sally Tuiala; Miriama Lima; Emele Paletasala; Elizabeth Ropeti; Sabrina Reupena; Lerissa Fong; Uanita Vaaga	Fiji; Makereta Bavon; Miriama Saurara; Milika Baleitamavua; Raylin Mario; Leanne Faktaufon; Adi Vavaitamana; Makereta Vodo; Ligieta Young; Danielle Keli; Ateca Valaca; Ana Maria Naiveli; Adi Nanova; Ro Qumivutia; Sisilia Raravula
Mixed	Papua New Guinea; Junior Hoki; Emmalyn John; Mangai Elomi; Kele Lessy; Francis Alu; Bessie Peter; Maria Alu; Bobby Vavona; Grace Kouba; Andrew Turalom; Maion Steven; Angelena Watego; Benny Nelson; Nadya Taubuso; Pauline Arazi; Kere Mavia; Freddy Gelam; Natalie Kuper; Ravu Ravu; Joylyn Tikot; Georgina Genaka; Farapo Makura; Eugene Eka; Angela Agi Rigolo; Jeffery Geno; Kelly Peter; Elison Waluka; Paul Matuta	Samoa; Michael Rasmussen; Siniva Williams; Arran Rogers; Etevise Vaifale; Darren Aofia; Christianna Perriman; George Komiti; Samantha Rogers; Jayde Afele; Pelenise Lima; Tasi Cordtz; Mandria Sua; Filon Eneliko; Eteuati Togiatoamai; Jedidiah Fagasua; Sally Tuiala; Gregory Hazelman; Miriama Lote Lima; Emele Paletsaia; Samoaautasi Toiovaa; Lafaele Leuta-Malo; Elizabeth Lydwina; Timoteo Ropeti; Sabrina Reupena; Raymond Schuster; Lerissa Fong; Peter Hazelman; Uanita Paulo Vaaga; Peter Togagae	Cook Islands; Anguna Kapi; Julieanne Westrupp; Geoffrey Halston; Upoko Tangata; Talia Rima Browne; Ngatupuna Joseph; Kalyah Atai; Terry Joe; Chedyn Mani; Rimaati Moekaa; Tuatai Joe; Noovao Noovao; Mamapo Emile; Conrad Piri; Grand David Jr; Charlie Poiri; Ngapare Noovao; Louani-Marie Marsters; Andrew Mokoroa; Tekura Moekaa; Teava Terangi; Phillippa Smith; Gelling Viniki; Mele Poaru; Ngatupuna Williams; Jeremy Campbell; Ursula Robati; Delano Atai; Atiria Tuati

== Men's tournament ==
Pos	Team	Pld	W	D	L	PF	PA	PD	Pts	Qualification	PNG	SAM	COK	FIJ	SOL	TON	TOK
1	Papua New Guinea	6	6	0	0	82	26	+56	18	Semi-finals	—	9–8	—	—	15–2	21–4	—
2	Samoa	6	4	0	2	64	25	+39	14	Semi-finals	—	—	—	8–6	—	—	16–1
3	Cook Islands	6	4	0	2	54	26	+28	14	Semi-finals	3–7	8–6	—	5–6	13–2	10–1	15–4
4	Fiji	6	4	0	2	52	33	+19	14	Semi-finals	6–12	—	—	—	—	—	13–2
5	Solomon Islands	6	2	0	4	21	67	−46	10	5th/6th-place play-off	—	0–14	—	2–12	—	9–8	—
6	Tonga	6	1	0	5	28	63	−35	8	5th/6th-place play-off	—	1–12	—	4–9	—	—	10–2
7	Tokelau	6	0	0	6	17	78	−61	6		3–18	—	—	—	5–6	—	—

Semi-finals
Samoa	12
Cook Islands	11
Papua New Guinea	10
Fiji	7
5th/6th play-off
Solomon Islands	7
Tonga	10

Gold Medal
Samoa	11
Papua New Guinea	12
Bronze Medal
Cook Islands	5
Fiji	9

== Women's tournament ==
Pos	Team	Pld	W	D	L	PF	PA	PD	Pts	Qualification	PNG	COK	SAM	FIJ	TON	SOL
1	Papua New Guinea	5	5	0	0	71	9	+62	15	Semi-finals	—	6–2	—	—	20–0	—
2	Cook Islands	4	2	1	1	25	18	+7	12 (Note: Teams awarded a win (3pts) for forfeited matches against Solomon Islands, no points awarded to Solomon Islands)	Semi-finals	—	—	—	—	12–3	0–0 (Note: Forfeited by Solomon Islands)
3	Samoa	5	3	0	2	45	19	+26	11	Semi-finals	0–8	4–6	—	—	—	—
4	Fiji	4	1	1	2	26	16	+10	10	Semi-finals	6–7	5–5	3–4	—	12–0	0–0 (Note: Forfeited by Solomon Islands)
5	Tonga	4	0	0	4	5	58	−53	7	5th/6th-place play-off	—	—	2–14	—	—	0–0 (Note: Forfeited by Solomon Islands)
6	Solomon Islands	2	0	0	2	1	53	−52	2	5th/6th-place play-off	1–30	—	0–23	—	—	—

Notes:

Semi-finals
Papua New Guinea	10
Fiji	5
Cook Islands	3
Samoa	5
5th/6th play-off
Tonga	15
Solomon Islands	3

Gold Medal
Samoa	4
Papua New Guinea	9
Bronze Medal
Cook Islands	5
Fiji	6

== Mixed tournament ==
Pos	Team	Pld	W	D	L	PF	PA	PD	Pts	Qualification	PNG	SAM	COK	FIJ	TON	SOL
1	Papua New Guinea	5	5	0	0	70	28	+42	15	Semi-finals	—	—	13–5	—	14–6	—
2	Samoa	5	4	0	1	52	29	+23	13	Semi-finals	12–14	—	6–5	—	—	—
3	Cook Islands	5	3	0	2	47	29	+18	11	Semi-finals	—	—	—	—	14–4	17–3
4	Fiji	5	2	0	3	39	35	+4	9	Semi-finals	3–11	4–7	3–8	—	11–6	18–3
5	Tonga	5	1	0	4	32	51	−19	7	5th/6th-place play-off	—	4–11	—	—	—	12–3
6	Solomon Islands	5	0	0	5	13	81	−68	5	5th/6th-place play-off	2–18	2–15	—	—	—	—

Semi-finals
Papua New Guinea	9
Fiji	5
Samoa	8
Cook Islands	7
5th/6th play-off
Tonga	C
Solomon Islands	C

Gold Medal
Samoa	9
Papua New Guinea	10
Bronze Medal
Cook Islands	10
Fiji	7

== See also ==
- Touch rugby at the Pacific Games
