= Australia at the 2015 Pacific Games =

- Flag of Australia
- IOC code: AUS

in Port Moresby, Papua New Guinea 4 July 2015 – 18 July 2015
- Competitors: 43 in 4 sports
- Medals Ranked 6th: Gold 17 Silver 19 Bronze 11 Total 47

Pacific Games appearances
- 2015; 2019; 2023

Australia competed at the 2015 Pacific Games in Port Moresby, Papua New Guinea from 4 to 18 July 2015. Australia qualified 43 athletes. It was the first time that Australia had competed in the Pacific Games.

Australia was ranked 6th at the Games, with 47 medals ( 17 gold - 19 silver - 11 bronze ).

== Rugby sevens ==
Australia qualified a team of 12 athletes.

Women

– Women's tournament.

- Nicole Beck (captain) (NSW)
- Brooke Anderson (NSW)
- Dominique du Toit (NSW)
- Nikki Etheridge (NSW)
- Georgie Friedrichs (QLD)
- Mollie Gray (NSW)
- Sarah Halvorsen (NSW)
- Mahalia Murphy (NSW)
- Taleena Simon (NSW)
- Tanisha Stanton (NSW)
- Laura Waldie (QLD)
- Brooke Walker (QLD)

== Sailing ==
Australia qualified 3 athletes.

Women

- Carissa Bridge (QLD)

Men

- Thomas Vincent (VIC)
- Mark Spearman (WA)

== Taekwondo ==
Australia qualified 12 athletes.

Women

- Deanna Kyriazopoulos (NSW)
- Keshena Waterford (ACT)
- Catherine Risbey (ACT)
- Caroline Marton (VIC)
- Carmen Marton (NSW)
- Nicole Men (ACT)
- Tassya Stevens (SA)

Men

- Thomas Auger (SA)
- Tom Afonczenko (VIC)
- Jack Marton (VIC)
- Hayder Shkara (NSW)
- Daniel Safstrom (VIC)
- Safwan Khalil (NSW)

== Weightlifting ==
Australia qualified 15 athletes.

Women

- Mary Barter (née Witham) (QLD)
- Erika Ropati-Frost (née Yamasaki) (QLD)
- Tia-Clair Toomey (QLD)
- Kiana Elliott (NSW)
- Philippa Malone (NSW)
- Camilla Fogagnolo (TAS)
- Belinda van Tienen (VIC)

Men

- Matthew Munns (WA)
- Benjamin Shaw (QLD)
- Mitchell Delbridge (QLD)
- Malek Chamoun (NSW)
- Francois Etoundi* (VIC)
- Liam Larkins (VIC)
- Zac Grgurevic (VIC)
- Philip Wood (VIC)

* Subject to selection conditions
