= Weightlifting at the 2010 Commonwealth Games – Women's +75 kg =

The women's +75 kg weightlifting event was an event at the weightlifting competition. The whole competition took place on 10 October. The weightlifter from Samoa won the gold, with a combined lift of 285 kg.

== Results ==
Rank	Name	Country	Group	B.weight (kg)	Snatch (kg)	Clean & Jerk (kg)	Total (kg)
1st place, gold medalist(s)	Ele Opeloge	Samoa	A	123.09	125	160	285
2nd place, silver medalist(s)	Maryam Usman	Nigeria	A	116.97	115	140	255
3rd place, bronze medalist(s)	Deborah Acason	Australia	A	92.95	110	135	245
4	Geeta Rani	India	A	113.79	100	135	235
5	Tracey Lambrechs	New Zealand	A	100.09	99	127	226
6	Narita Viliamu	Niue	A	145.52	90	125	215
7	Iuniarra Simanu	Samoa	A	100.38	86	110	196
8	Shalinee Valaydon	Mauritius	A	100.05	83	105	188
9	Becky Namusoke	Uganda	A	96.47	80	101	181
10	Luisa Peters	Cook Islands	A	88.72	70	85	155
11	Xolile Nxumalo	Swaziland	A	83.87	60	87	147

== See also ==
- 2010 Commonwealth Games
- Weightlifting at the 2010 Commonwealth Games
