= 2011 World Weightlifting Championships – Women's +75 kg =

The women's competition in the super heavyweight (+ 75 kg) division was held on 12–13 November 2011.

== Schedule ==
| Date | Time | Event |
|---|---|---|
| 12 November 2011 | 09:00 | Group C |
| 13 November 2011 | 09:00 | Group B |
| 13 November 2011 | 14:00 | Group A |

== Medalists ==
| Event | Gold | | Silver | | Bronze | |
|---|---|---|---|---|---|---|
| Snatch | Tatiana Kashirina (RUS) | 147 kg | Zhou Lulu (CHN) | 146 kg | Yuliya Dovhal (AZE) | 118 kg |
| Clean & Jerk | Zhou Lulu (CHN) | 182 kg | Tatiana Kashirina (RUS) | 175 kg | Mariam Usman (NGR) | 156 kg |
| Total | Zhou Lulu (CHN) | 328 kg | Tatiana Kashirina (RUS) | 322 kg | Mariam Usman (NGR) | 273 kg |

== Records ==
Prior to this competition, the existing world records were as follows.

| World Record | Snatch | Tatiana Kashirina (RUS) | 146 kg | Kazan, Russia | 17 April 2011 |
| World Record | Clean & Jerk | Jang Mi-ran (KOR) | 187 kg | Goyang, South Korea | 28 November 2009 |
| World Record | Total | Tatiana Kashirina (RUS) | 327 kg | Kazan, Russia | 17 April 2011 |

== Results ==
| Rank | Athlete | Group | Body weight | Snatch (kg) | | | | Clean & Jerk (kg) | | | | Total |
| Rank | Athlete | Group | Body weight | 1 | 2 | 3 | Rank | 1 | 2 | 3 | Rank | Total |
|---|---|---|---|---|---|---|---|---|---|---|---|---|
| 1st place, gold medalist(s) | Zhou Lulu (CHN) | A | 133.66 | 135 | 143 | 146 | 2nd place, silver medalist(s) | 173 | 181 | 182 | 1st place, gold medalist(s) | 328 |
| 2nd place, silver medalist(s) | Tatiana Kashirina (RUS) | A | 98.10 | 140 | 145 | 147 | 1st place, gold medalist(s) | ~~175~~ | 175 | ~~181~~ | 2nd place, silver medalist(s) | 322 |
| 3rd place, bronze medalist(s) | Mariam Usman (NGR) | B | 122.88 | ~~117~~ | 117 | ~~121~~ | 4 | 151 | 156 | ~~160~~ | 3rd place, bronze medalist(s) | 273 |
| 4 | Yuliya Dovhal (AZE) | A | 87.37 | 115 | 118 | ~~121~~ | 3rd place, bronze medalist(s) | 145 | ~~150~~ | ~~150~~ | 6 | 263 |
| 5 | Alexandra Aborneva (KAZ) | A | 102.27 | 105 | 110 | ~~115~~ | 9 | 141 | 147 | 150 | 4 | 260 |
| 6 | Mami Shimamoto (JPN) | A | 106.95 | 108 | 111 | 113 | 8 | 140 | 144 | 147 | 5 | 260 |
| 7 | Oliba Nieve (ECU) | A | 94.94 | 107 | 112 | 116 | 5 | 138 | 143 | ~~147~~ | 7 | 259 |
| 8 | Ümmühan Uçar (TUR) | B | 87.35 | 105 | 110 | 115 | 6 | 137 | ~~145~~ | ~~145~~ | 12 | 252 |
| 9 | Afaf Ibrahim (EGY) | B | 102.24 | 103 | 107 | ~~110~~ | 11 | 137 | 142 | ~~146~~ | 9 | 249 |
| 10 | Sarah Robles (USA) | B | 118.42 | 105 | 110 | 114 | 7 | 135 | ~~140~~ | ~~140~~ | 14 | 249 |
| 11 | Fumiko Jonai (JPN) | B | 108.91 | ~~101~~ | 101 | 103 | 15 | ~~143~~ | 143 | ~~146~~ | 8 | 246 |
| 12 | Shaimaa Khalaf (EGY) | B | 106.95 | 100 | 105 | — | 12 | 130 | 135 | 140 | 10 | 245 |
| 13 | Chioma Amaechi (USA) | B | 109.84 | 95 | ~~98~~ | 98 | 22 | 130 | ~~140~~ | 140 | 11 | 238 |
| 14 | Kathleen Schöppe (GER) | C | 95.35 | 97 | 100 | 103 | 13 | 127 | 131 | 134 | 15 | 237 |
| 15 | Tania Mascorro (MEX) | C | 100.07 | 103 | 106 | 109 | 10 | 128 | ~~132~~ | ~~132~~ | 19 | 237 |
| 16 | Daryna Goncharova (UKR) | B | 100.72 | ~~100~~ | ~~100~~ | 100 | 19 | ~~135~~ | 135 | ~~140~~ | 13 | 235 |
| 17 | Yaniuska Espinosa (VEN) | B | 110.13 | 100 | ~~105~~ | ~~105~~ | 20 | 125 | 130 | 133 | 16 | 233 |
| 18 | Tracey Lambrechs (NZL) | C | 101.30 | 102 | ~~106~~ | ~~106~~ | 16 | 126 | ~~130~~ | 130 | 18 | 232 |
| 19 | Liu Yun-chien (TPE) | B | 91.18 | 98 | ~~101~~ | ~~101~~ | 21 | 127 | 130 | ~~133~~ | 17 | 228 |
| 20 | Verónica Saladín (DOM) | C | 103.07 | 97 | ~~102~~ | 103 | 14 | 118 | 125 | ~~127~~ | 21 | 228 |
| 21 | Annarosa Campaldini (ITA) | C | 99.16 | 94 | 99 | 101 | 18 | 118 | ~~124~~ | 124 | 22 | 225 |
| 22 | Mayara Silva Gomes (BRA) | C | 124.05 | 88 | 91 | 94 | 23 | 120 | ~~125~~ | 126 | 20 | 220 |
| 23 | Naira Harutyunyan (ARM) | C | 92.74 | 81 | ~~88~~ | ~~88~~ | 24 | 99 | 110 | ~~116~~ | 23 | 191 |
| — | Krisztina Magát (HUN) | C | 101.79 | 96 | 100 | 102 | 17 | ~~119~~ | ~~119~~ | ~~119~~ | — | — |
| — | Ele Opeloge (SAM) | A | 128.04 | ~~120~~ | ~~120~~ | ~~120~~ | — | — | — | — | — | — |
| — | Almira Lizde (BIH) | C | 75.61 | ~~80~~ | ~~80~~ | ~~80~~ | — | — | — | — | — | — |
| DQ | Olha Korobka (UKR) | A | 166.60 | 127 | ~~131~~ | ~~131~~ | — | 150 | 157 | — | — | — |
| DQ | Hripsime Khurshudyan (ARM) | A | 90.08 | 125 | ~~130~~ | — | — | — | — | — | — | — |

== New records ==
| Snatch | 147 kg | Tatiana Kashirina (RUS) | WR |
| Total | 328 kg | Zhou Lulu (CHN) | WR |
