= Weightlifting at the 2016 Summer Olympics – Women's +75 kg =

Women's +75 kg at the Games of the XXXI Olympiad
- Venue: Riocentro
- Date: 14 August 2016
- Competitors: 16 from 14 nations
- Winning total: 307 kg

Medalists
1st place, gold medalist(s)		Meng Suping	China
2nd place, silver medalist(s)		Kim Kuk-hyang	North Korea
3rd place, bronze medalist(s)		Sarah Robles	United States

The Women's +75 kg weightlifting competitions at the 2016 Summer Olympics in Rio de Janeiro took place from 14 August at the Pavilion 2 of Riocentro.

== Schedule ==
All times are Time in Brazil (UTC-03:00)

Date	Time	Event
14 August 2016	15:30	Group B
14 August 2016	19:00	Group A

== Records ==
Prior to this competition, the existing world and Olympic records were as follows.

World record	Snatch	Tatiana Kashirina (RUS)	155 kg	Almaty, Kazakhstan	16 November 2014
World record	Clean & Jerk	Tatiana Kashirina (RUS)	193 kg	Almaty, Kazakhstan	16 November 2014
World record	Total	Tatiana Kashirina (RUS)	348 kg	Almaty, Kazakhstan	16 November 2014
Olympic record	Snatch	Tatiana Kashirina (RUS)	151 kg	London, United Kingdom	5 August 2012
Olympic record	Clean & Jerk	Zhou Lulu (CHN)	187 kg	London, United Kingdom	5 August 2012
Olympic record	Total	Zhou Lulu (CHN)	333 kg	London, United Kingdom	5 August 2012

== Results ==
Rank	Athlete	Nation	Group	Body weight	Snatch (kg)				Clean & Jerk (kg)				Total
Rank	Athlete	Nation	Group	Body weight	1	2	3	Result	1	2	3	Result	Total
1st place, gold medalist(s)	Meng Suping	China	A	120.27	~~125~~	125	130	130	~~175~~	175	177	177	307
2nd place, silver medalist(s)	Kim Kuk-hyang	North Korea	A	100.43	123	127	131	131	162	170	175	175	306
3rd place, bronze medalist(s)	Sarah Robles	United States	A	143.30	118	122	126	126	151	155	160	160	286
4	Shaimaa Khalaf	Egypt	A	123.75	117	~~121~~	~~121~~	117	155	161	~~169~~	161	278
5	Lee Hui-sol	South Korea	A	119.49	119	122	~~126~~	122	153	~~159~~	~~159~~	153	275
6	Son Young-hee	South Korea	A	109.58	115	118	~~121~~	118	155	~~162~~	~~166~~	155	273
7	Yaniuska Espinosa	Venezuela	B	114.08	115	119	121	121	145	149	152	152	273
8	Andreea Aanei	Romania	A	120.01	~~119~~	~~119~~	120	120	145	~~154~~	~~154~~	145	265
9	Mariam Usman	Nigeria	A	122.39	115	~~120~~	~~120~~	115	145	150	~~152~~	150	265
10	Anastasiya Lysenko	Ukraine	B	100.97	~~117~~	~~117~~	117	117	~~146~~	146	~~156~~	146	263
11	Yosra Dhieb	Tunisia	B	120.06	~~106~~	106	111	111	133	138	~~141~~	138	249
12	Anastasiia Hotfrid	Georgia	B	86.98	110	113	~~115~~	113	130	~~135~~	135	135	248
13	Tracey Lambrechs	New Zealand	B	106.54	~~98~~	98	~~101~~	98	~~133~~	133	~~139~~	133	231
14	Luisa Peters	Cook Islands	B	100.27	95	~~100~~	100	100	119	124	~~126~~	124	224
15	Bouchra Fatima Zohra Hirech	Algeria	B	80.35	83	87	~~90~~	87	105	~~108~~	~~108~~	105	192
–	Naryury Pérez	Venezuela	B	99.91	110	115	117	117	~~145~~	~~145~~	~~145~~	–	–
