= Weightlifting at the 2018 Commonwealth Games – Men's 77 kg =

Weightlifting – Men's 77 kg at the 2018 Commonwealth Games
- Venue: Carrara Sports and Leisure Centre
- Dates: 7 April 2018
- Competitors: 14 from 14 nations
- Winning total weight: 317

Medalists
gold medal	Sathish Sivalingam	India
silver medal	Jack Oliver	England
bronze medal	François Etoundi	Australia

The Men's 77 kg weightlifting event at the 2018 Commonwealth Games took place at the Carrara Sports and Leisure Centre on 7 April 2018. The weightlifter from India won the gold, with a combined lift of 317 kg.

== Records ==
Prior to this competition, the existing world, Commonwealth and Games records were as follows:

World record	Snatch	Lü Xiaojun (CHN)	177 kg	Rio de Janeiro, Brazil	10 August 2016
World record	Clean & Jerk	Nijat Rahimov (KAZ)	214 kg	Rio de Janeiro, Brazil	10 August 2016
World record	Total	Lü Xiaojun (CHN)	380 kg	Wrocław, Poland	24 October 2013
Commonwealth record	Snatch	Yukio Peter (NRU)	157 kg	Darwin, Australia	12 May 2011
Commonwealth record	Clean & Jerk	Yukio Peter (NRU)	196 kg	Darwin, Australia	14 May 2009
Commonwealth record	Total	Yukio Peter (NRU)	350 kg	Sigatoka, Fiji	9 November 2005
Games record	Snatch	Sathish Sivalingam (IND)	149 kg	Glasgow, Scotland	27 Jul 2014
Games record	Clean & Jerk	Damian Brown (AUS)	187 kg	Kuala Lumpur, Malaysia	17 September 1998
Games record	Total	Yukio Peter (NRU)	333 kg	New Delhi, India	7 October 2010

== Schedule ==
All times are Australian Eastern Standard Time (UTC+10)

Date	Time	Round
Saturday, 7 April 2018	09:42	Final

== Results ==
Rank	Athlete	Body weight (kg)	Snatch (kg)				Clean & Jerk (kg)				Total
Rank	Athlete	Body weight (kg)	1	2	3	Result	1	2	3	Result	Total
1st place, gold medalist(s)	Sathish Sivalingam (IND)	76.89	136	140	144	144	169	173	-	173	317
2nd place, silver medalist(s)	Jack Oliver (ENG)	76.44	141	145	~~148~~	145	167	~~171~~	~~171~~	167	312
3rd place, bronze medalist(s)	François Etoundi (AUS)	76.91	128	133	136	136	162	~~168~~	169	169	305
4	Nicolas Vachon (CAN)	76.38	~~127~~	127	131	131	~~168~~	168	~~175~~	168	299
5	Chinthana Vidanage (SRI)	76.78	128	132	~~135~~	132	166	~~168~~	~~168~~	166	298
6	Abdul Mubin Rahim (MAS)	76.71	130	~~133~~	~~133~~	130	160	~~165~~	~~165~~	160	290
7	Cameron McTaggart (NZL)	76.92	127	130	~~133~~	130	156	~~160~~	160	160	290
8	Toua Udia (PNG)	76.95	~~125~~	125	~~130~~	125	165	~~170~~	~~170~~	165	290
9	Ika Aliklik (NRU)	76.25	120	~~126~~	128	128	153	160	~~164~~	160	288
10	Webstar Lukose (KEN)	76.36	120	125	127	127	150	155	~~160~~	155	282
11	Romario Forde (BAR)	76.69	~~117~~	~~117~~	117	117	160	~~166~~	~~166~~	160	277
12	Jack Anthony Madanamoothoo (MRI)	76.20	115	120	~~127~~	120	145	153	~~158~~	153	273
	Taretiita Tabaroua (KIR)	76.71	125	130	~~134~~	130	~~176~~	~~176~~	~~176~~	–	–
	Karl McClean (NIR)	74.52	~~114~~	~~114~~	~~114~~	—					DNF
