= Touch rugby at the 2003 South Pacific Games =

Touch rugby at the 2003 South Pacific Games in Suva was held on 7–10 July 2003. Fiji won the finals of the men's and mixed tournaments to claim both gold medals on offer. Touch rugby for women was not introduced until the 2009 Pacific Mini Games held in Rarotonga.

== Medal summary ==
=== Medal table ===
Rank	Nation	Gold	Silver	Bronze	Total
1	Fiji (FIJ)	2	0	0	2
2	Cook Islands (COK)	0	1	0	1
2	Niue (NIU)	0	1	0	1
2	Papua New Guinea (PNG)	0	1	0	1
2	Samoa (SAM)	0	1	0	1
Totals (5 entries)		2	4	0	6

=== Results ===
Event	Gold	Silver	Bronze
Men	Fiji	Papua New Guinea	Niue
Mixed	Fiji	Cook Islands	Samoa

== See also ==
- Touch rugby at the Pacific Games
