= Touch rugby at the 2015 Pacific Games – Men's tournament =

The Men's touch rugby tournament at the 2015 Pacific Games was held in Port Moresby from 3 to 7 July 2015 at the Bisini Touch Football Fields. The hosts Papua New Guinea won the gold medal defeating Samoa by 8–7 in the final. The Cook Islands took the bronze medal defeating the Solomon Islands by 18–4 in the third place play-off.

== Participants ==
Seven teams played in the tournament:

- Cook Islands
- Kiribati
- Papua New Guinea
- Samoa
- Solomon Islands
- Tonga
- Tuvalu

== Format ==
The teams played a round-robin followed by semifinals and play-offs for the medals.

== Preliminary round ==
Teams	Pld	W	D	L	PF	PA	+/−
Papua New Guinea	6	6	0	0	102	12	+90
Samoa	6	5	0	4	75	24	+51
Cook Islands	6	3	1	2	41	40	+1
Solomon Islands	6	2	1	3	31	48	-17
Tonga	6	2	0	4	25	45	-20
Tuvalu	6	2	0	4	25	60	-35
Kiribati	6	0	0	6	17	87	-70
Updated: 11 July 2015 • Teams ranked 1 to 4 (Green background) advanced to the semifinals.

=== Day 1 ===
3 July 2015
09:00

Kiribati	1–24	Papua New Guinea

Bisini Touch Football Fields

3 July 2015
11:00

Solomon Islands	4–6	Tonga

Bisini Touch Football Fields

3 July 2015
14:00

Cook Islands	2–17	Papua New Guinea

Bisini Touch Football Fields

3 July 2015
15:00

Samoa	10–3	Tonga

Bisini Touch Football Fields

3 July 2015
15:00

Kiribati	2–8	Solomon Islands

Bisini Touch Football Fields

=== Day 2 ===
4 July 2015
11:00

Papua New Guinea	19–1	Solomon Islands

Bisini Touch Football Fields

4 July 2015
12:00

Kiribati	4–23	Samoa

Bisini Touch Football Fields

=== Day 3 ===
5 July 2015
09:00

Tonga	5–6	Tuvalu

Bisini Touch Football Fields

5 July 2015
09:00

Cook Islands	4–4	Solomon Islands

Bisini Touch Football Fields

5 July 2015
10:00

Papua New Guinea	10–7	Samoa

Bisini Touch Football Fields

5 July 2015
11:00

Cook Islands	11–3	Tuvalu

Bisini Touch Football Fields

5 July 2015
13:00

Cook Islands	8–3	Tonga

Bisini Touch Football Fields

5 July 2015
14:00

Samoa	13–4	Solomon Islands

Bisini Touch Football Fields

5 July 2015
15:00

Kiribati	2–11	Tuvalu

Bisini Touch Football Fields

=== Day 4 ===
6 July 2015
09:00

Cook Islands	2–8	Samoa

Bisini Touch Football Fields

6 July 2015
09:00

Kiribati	3–7	Tonga

Bisini Touch Football Fields

6 July 2015
10:00

Samoa	14–1	Tuvalu

Bisini Touch Football Fields

6 July 2015
10:00

Papua New Guinea	18–0	Tuvalu

Bisini Touch Football Fields

6 July 2015
13:00

Cook Islands	14–5	Kiribati

Bisini Touch Football Fields

6 July 2015
14:00

Papua New Guinea	14–1	Tonga

Bisini Touch Football Fields

6 July 2015
14:00

Solomon Islands	10–4	Tuvalu

Bisini Touch Football Fields

== Finals ==
=== Semifinals ===
7 July 2015
10:00

Cook Islands	3–9	Samoa

Bisini Touch Football Fields

7 July 2015
10:00

Papua New Guinea	17–2	Solomon Islands

Bisini Touch Football Fields

=== Bronze final ===
7 July 2015
13:00

Cook Islands	18–4	Solomon Islands
	Report

Bisini Touch Football Fields

=== Gold final ===
7 July 2015
15:00

Papua New Guinea	8–7	Samoa
	Report

Bisini Touch Football Fields

== See also ==
- Touch rugby at the Pacific Games
- Touch rugby at the 2015 Pacific Games – Women's tournament
- Touch rugby at the 2015 Pacific Games – Mixed tournament
