= Touch rugby at the 2015 Pacific Games – Women's tournament =

The Women's touch rugby tournament at the 2015 Pacific Games was held in Port Moresby from 3 to 7 July 2015 at the Bisini Touch Football Fields. The hosts, Papua New Guinea, won the gold medal defeating Samoa by 6–2 in the final. The Cook Islands took the bronze medal defeating Kiribati by 11–2 in the third place play-off.

== Participants ==
Five teams played in the tournament:

- Cook Islands
- Kiribati
- Papua New Guinea
- Samoa
- Tonga

== Format ==
The teams played a round-robin followed by semifinals and play-offs for the medals.

== Preliminary round ==
Teams	Pld	W	D	L	PF	PA	+/−
Papua New Guinea	4	4	0	0	63	4	+59
Cook Islands	4	2	1	1	42	11	+31
Samoa	4	2	1	1	42	17	+25
Kiribati	4	1	0	3	11	62	-51
Tonga	4	0	0	4	4	68	-64
Updated: 11 July 2015 • Teams ranked 1 to 4 (Green background) advanced to the semifinals.

=== Day 1 ===
3 July 2015
12:00

Papua New Guinea	24–0	Tonga

Bisini - Touch Football Fields

3 July 2015
13:00

Cook Islands	18–1	Kiribati

Bisini - Touch Football Fields

=== Day 2 ===
4 July 2015
09:00

Papua New Guinea	8–1	Samoa

Bisini - Touch Football Fields

4 July 2015
10:00

Cook Islands	18–0	Tonga

Bisini - Touch Football Fields

4 July 2015
13:00

Cook Islands	2–6	Papua New Guinea

Bisini - Touch Football Fields

4 July 2015
13:00

Kiribati	4–16	Samoa

Bisini - Touch Football Fields

=== Day 3 ===
5 July 2015
11:00

Cook Islands	4–4	Samoa

Bisini - Touch Football Fields

5 July 2015
12:00

Kiribati	5–3	Tonga

Bisini - Touch Football Fields

=== Day 4 ===
6 July 2015
11:00

Samoa	21–1	Tonga

Bisini - Touch Football Fields

6 July 2015
12:00

Kiribati	1–25	Papua New Guinea

Bisini - Touch Football Fields

== Finals ==
=== Semifinals ===
7 July 2015
9:00

Samoa	4–3	Cook Islands

Bisini Touch Football Fields

7 July 2015
9:00

Papua New Guinea	25–1	Kiribati

Bisini Touch Football Fields

=== Bronze final ===
7 July 2015
12:00

Cook Islands	11–2	Kiribati
	Report

Bisini Touch Football Fields

=== Gold final ===
7 July 2015
14:00

Papua New Guinea	6–2	Samoa
	Report

Bisini Touch Football Fields

== See also ==
- Touch rugby at the Pacific Games
- Touch rugby at the 2015 Pacific Games – Men's tournament
- Touch rugby at the 2015 Pacific Games – Mixed tournament
