= Luisa Peters =

Cook Islands weightlifter

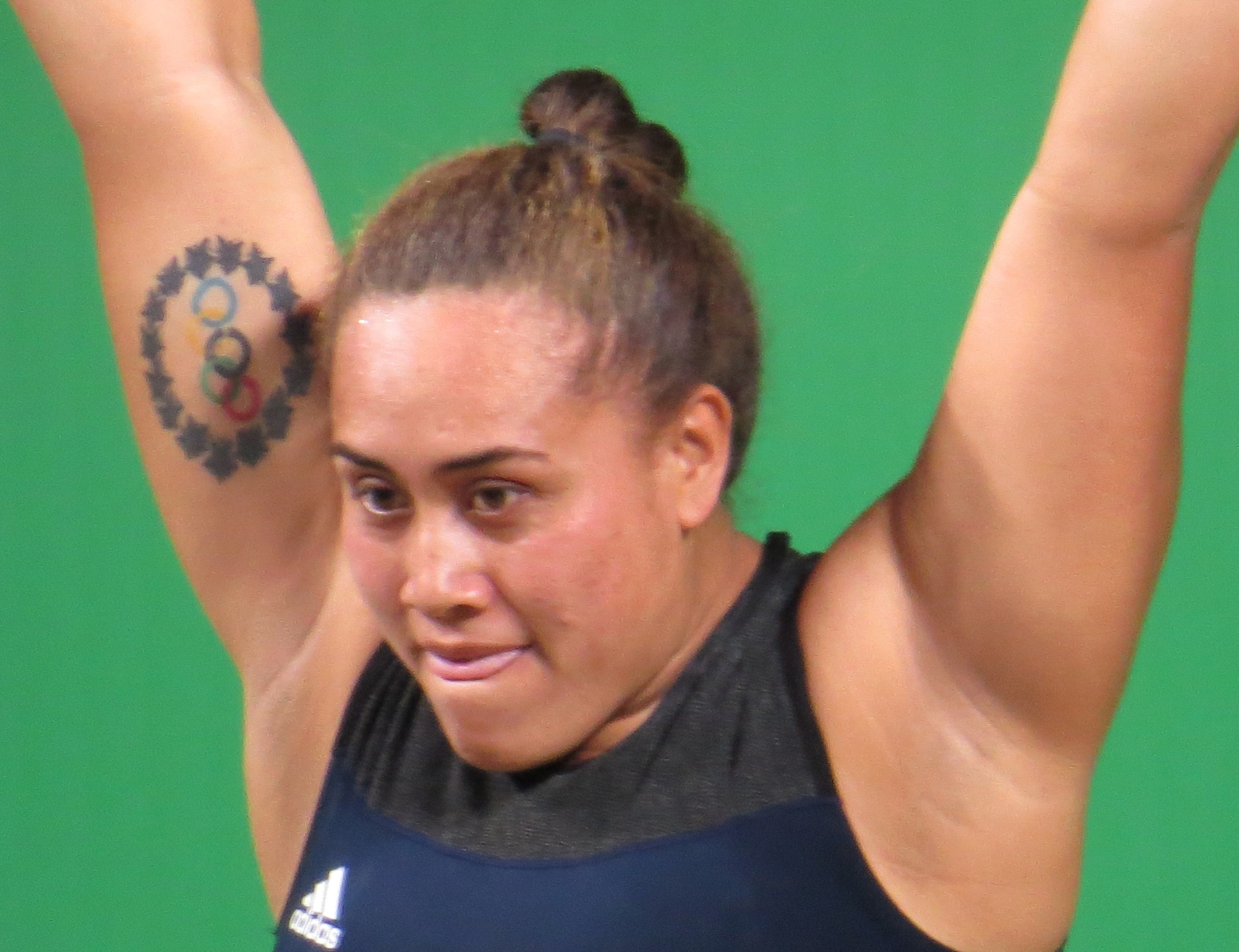
- Peters at the 2016 Olympics

Personal information
- Full name: Luisa Fatiaki Taitapu Peters
- Born: 27 June 1993 (age 32) Rarotonga, Cook Islands
- Height: 165 cm (5 ft 5 in)
- Weight: 100 kg (220 lb)

Sport
- Country: Cook Islands
- Sport: Weightlifting
- Event: +75 kg
- Club: Oceania Weightlifting Institute
- Coached by: Paul Coffa (club); Unakea Kauvai (national)
Medal record
Women's weightlifting
Representing Cook Islands
Pacific Games
Bronze medal – third place	2015 Port Moresby	+75 kg
Commonwealth Championships
Gold medal – first place	2015 Pune	+75 kg
Oceania Championships
Bronze medal – third place	2015 Port Moresby	+75 kg
Bronze medal – third place	2016 Suva	+75 kg

Luisa Fatiaki Taitapu Peters (born 27 June 1993) is a police officer and retired weightlifter from the Cook Islands, who competes in the +75 kg weight division. She participated in two Olympics (2012, 2016) and three Commonwealth Games (2010, 2014, 2018) with the best result of fifth place in 2018. She won a bronze medal at the 2015 Pacific Games.

Peters took up weightlifting aged 16. In 2016, she was elected on a four-year term as a vice president of the Oceania Weightlifting Federation, becoming its first female official.

In 2025, she was elected as the Cook Islands Sports and National Olympic Committee’s first female president.

== Major results ==
Year	Venue	Weight	Snatch (kg)				Clean & Jerk (kg)				Total	Rank
Year	Venue	Weight	1	2	3	Rank	1	2	3	Rank	Total	Rank
Representing Cook Islands
Olympic Games
2016	Rio de Janeiro, Brazil	+75 kg	95	~~100~~	100	14	119	124	~~126~~	14	224	14
2012	London, United Kingdom	+75 kg	74	78	82	13	95	100	~~105~~	13	182	12
World Championships
2015	Houston, United States	+75 kg	92	95	~~98~~	31	115	~~120~~	~~120~~	31	210	30
Oceania Championships
2017	Gold Coast, Australia	+90 kg	~~100~~	~~100~~	~~100~~	—	—	—	—	—	—	—
2016	Suva, Fiji	+75 kg	95	~~100~~	~~100~~	3rd place, bronze medalist(s)	117	~~122~~	~~122~~	3rd place, bronze medalist(s)	212	3rd place, bronze medalist(s)
2015	Port Moresby, Papua New Guinea	+75 kg	~~94~~	94	~~98~~	3rd place, bronze medalist(s)	~~113~~	~~113~~	113	3rd place, bronze medalist(s)	207	3rd place, bronze medalist(s)
Commonwealth Games
2018	Gold Coast, Australia	+90 kg	100	~~103~~	~~103~~	6	120	125	~~127~~	4	225	5
2014	Glasgow, United Kingdom	+75 kg	95	100	~~103~~	6	115	120	125	5	225	6
2010	Delhi, India	+75 kg	62	65	70	10	81	85	~~88~~	10	155	10
Pacific Games
2015	Port Moresby, Papua New Guinea	+75 kg	~~94~~	94	~~98~~	3rd place, bronze medalist(s)	~~113~~	~~113~~	113	3rd place, bronze medalist(s)	207	3rd place, bronze medalist(s)
2011	Nouméa, New Caledonia	+75 kg	73	77	80	4	92	~~95~~	95	4	175	4
