= Touch rugby at the 2003 South Pacific Games – Men's tournament =

The Men's touch rugby tournament at the 2003 Pacific Games was held in Suva from 7 to 10 July 2003 at the Veiuto Primary School. Fiji won the gold medal, defeating Papua New Guinea by 6–5 in the final. Samoa took the bronze medal.

== Participants ==
Seven teams played in the tournament:

- Fiji
- Niue
- Papua New Guinea
- Samoa
- Tuvalu
- Tonga
- Tahiti

== Format ==
The teams played a round-robin followed by play-offs for the medals.

== Preliminary round ==
Teams	Pld	W	D	L	PF	PA	+/−
Papua New Guinea							
Fiji							
Samoa							
Tuvalu							
Tonga							
Niue							
Tahiti							
• Teams ranked 1 to 4 (Green background) advanced to the medal play-offs.

=== Day 1 ===
7 Jul 2009
10:00 am

Tuvalu	10–1	Tahiti

Veiuto Primary School No. 1

7 Jul 2009
10:00 am

Fiji	6–7	Papua New Guinea

Veiuto Primary School No. 2

7 Jul 2009
11:00 am

Tonga	1–4	Samoa

Veiuto Primary School No. 1

7 Jul 2009
1:00 pm

Tahiti	0–20	Fiji

Veiuto Primary School No. 1

7 Jul 2009
2:00 pm

Papua New Guinea	6–1	Tonga

Veiuto Primary School No. 1

7 Jul 2009
2:00 pm

Samoa	2–0	Niue

Veiuto Primary School No. 2

=== Day 2 ===
8 Jul 2009
10:00 am

Papua New Guinea	10–5	Samoa

Veiuto Primary School No. 1

8 Jul 2009
11:00 am

Niue	7–8	Tuvalu

Veiuto Primary School No. 1

8 Jul 2009
12:00 pm

Fiji	10–5	Tonga

Veiuto Primary School No. 1

8 Jul 2009
1:00 pm

Papua New Guinea	15–6	Niue

Veiuto Primary School No. 1

8 Jul 2009
2:00 pm

Tahiti	0–14	Samoa

Veiuto Primary School No. 1

8 Jul 2009
3:00 pm

Tonga	2–5	Tuvalu

Veiuto Primary School No. 1

=== Day 3 ===
9 Jul 2009
1:00 am

Fiji	12–6	Samoa

Veiuto Primary School No. 1

9 Jul 2009
11:00 am

Tonga	7–5	Niue

Veiuto Primary School No. 2

9 Jul 2009
1:00 pm

Papua New Guinea	12–4	Tuvalu

Veiuto Primary School No. 2

9 Jul 2009
9:00 am

Fiji	11–1	Tuvalu

Veiuto Primary School No. 1

9 Jul 2009
9:00 am

Tahiti	4–13	Niue

Veiuto Primary School No. 2

9 Jul 2009
11:00 am

Papua New Guinea	22–0	Tahiti

Veiuto Primary School No. 1

9 Jul 2009
3:00 pm

Tahiti	1–21	Tonga

Veiuto Primary School No. 2

9 Jul 2009
4:00 pm

Tuvalu	5–6	Samoa

Veiuto Primary School No. 1

9 Jul 2009
4:00 pm

Fiji	13–3	Niue

Veiuto Primary School No. 2

== Lower bracket play-offs ==
Seventh place knockout			Fifth place
			1	Tonga
2	Niue	9		Niue
3	Tahiti	3

=== Seventh place knockout ===
10 Jul 2009
10:00 am

Niue	9–3	Tahiti

Veiuto Primary School No. 1

=== Fifth play-off ===
10 Jul 2009
1:00 pm

Tonga	def. by	Niue

Veiuto Primary School No. 1

== Medal play-offs ==
Semifinals
Papua New Guinea	6
Fiji	5
Samoa	10
Tuvalu	5

Preliminary final
Fiji	11
Samoa	2

Grand final
Papua New Guinea	5
Fiji	6

=== Major semi-final ===
10 Jul 2009
8:00 am

Papua New Guinea	6–5	Fiji

Veiuto Primary School No. 1

=== Elimination semi-final ===
10 Jul 2009
9:00 am

Samoa	10–5	Tuvalu

Veiuto Primary School No. 1

=== Preliminary final ===
10 Jul 2009
12:00 pm

Fiji	11–2	Samoa

Veiuto Primary School No. 1

=== Final ===
10 Jul 2009
3:00 pm

Papua New Guinea	5–6	Fiji

Veiuto Primary School No. 1

== See also ==
- Touch rugby at the Pacific Games
