= Anastasiia Hotfrid =

Georgian weightlifter (born 1996)

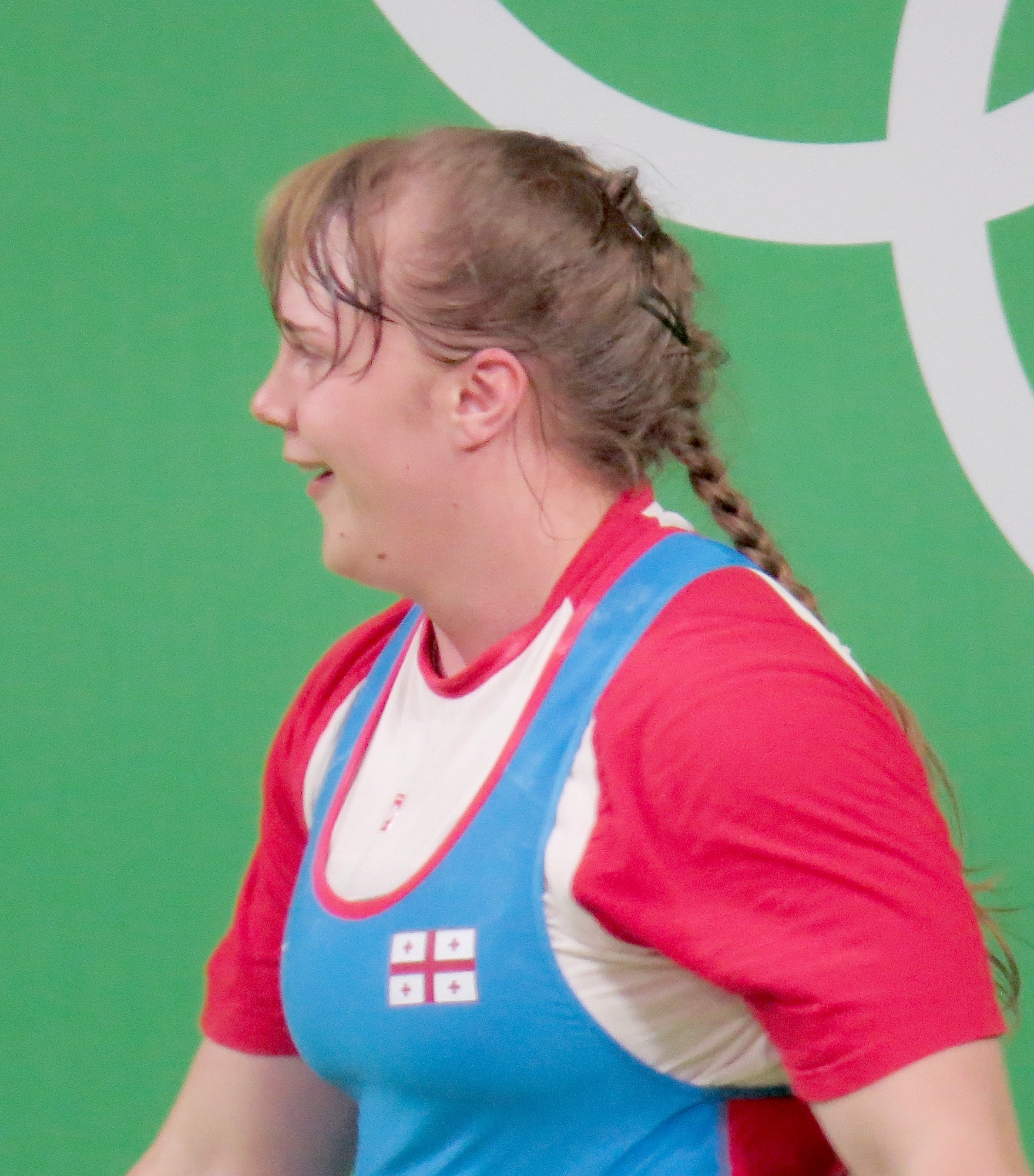
- Hotfrid at the 2016 Olympics

Personal information
- Born: 25 April 1996 (age 30) Snizhne, Donetsk Oblast, Ukraine
- Height: 169 cm (5 ft 7 in)
- Weight: 87 kg (192 lb)

Sport
- Sport: Weightlifting
- Coached by: Giorgi Asanidze; Avtandil Gakhokidze; George Tsirekidze; Sergei Romanov
Medal record
Women's weightlifting
Representing Georgia
World Championships
Gold medal – first place	2017 Anaheim	–90 kg
European Championships
Gold medal – first place	2016 Førde	+75 kg
Gold medal – first place	2018 Bucharest	–90 kg
Silver medal – second place	2023 Yerevan	+87 kg
Silver medal – second place	2024 Sofia	+87 kg
Bronze medal – third place	2022 Tirana	–87 kg
Bronze medal – third place	2026 Batumi	+86 kg

Anastasiia Hotfrid (Georgian: ანასტასია გოტფრიდი, romanized: anast'asia got'pridi; born 25 April 1996) is a Ukrainian-born Georgian weightlifter who competes in the +75 kg division. She placed 12th at the 2015 World Championships and at the 2016 Olympics. She won a gold medal at the 2016 European Championships, and gold at the 2017 World Weightlifting Championships.

== Career ==
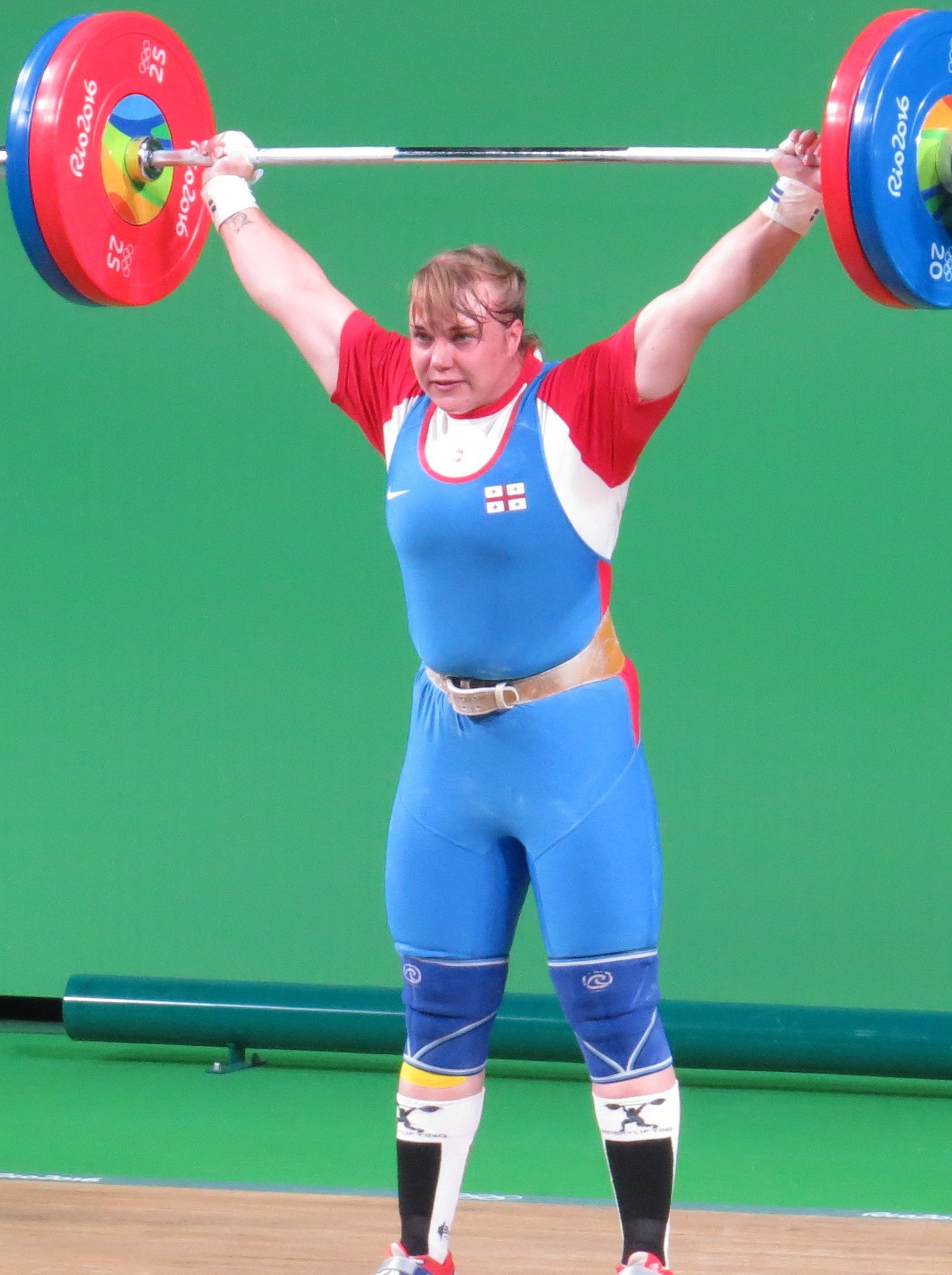
Hotfrid at the 2016 Olympics

Hotfrid was born in Ukraine and is married to the Ukrainian weightlifting coach and former Olympic weightlifter Denys Hotfrid. In Ukraine she is coached by her father, as her husband does not want her to compete in weightlifting. In 2015, because of a conflict within the Ukrainian weightlifting team, she moved to Georgia. Her family remains in Ukraine, and hence she spends her time between the two countries.
