= New Zealand at the 2015 Pacific Games =

- IOC code: NZL

4 July 2015 – 18 July 2015
- Competitors: 49 in 3 sports
- Medals Ranked 17th: Gold 1 Silver 9 Bronze 10 Total 20

Pacific Games appearances
- 2015; 2019; 2023

New Zealand competed at the 2015 Pacific Games in Port Moresby, Papua New Guinea from 4 to 18 July 2015. New Zealand qualified 49 athletes.

== Football ==
New Zealand named a squad of 23 players.

Men

Coach: Anthony Hudson

No.	Pos.	Player	Date of birth (age)	Caps	Goals	2015 club
1	GK	Oliver Sail	13 January 1996 (aged 19)	0	0	(New Zealand Football) Wellington Phoenix
2	DF	Kip Colvey	15 March 1994 (aged 21)	0	0	(United States Soccer Federation) Cal Poly Mustangs
3	DF	Deklan Wynne	20 March 1995 (aged 20)	0	0	(New Zealand Football) Wanderers SC
4	DF	Sam Brotherton	2 October 1996 (aged 18)	0	0	(New Zealand Football) Wanderers SC
5	DF	Alec Solomons	15 September 1993 (aged 21)	0	0	(New Zealand Football) Waitakere United
6	MF	Bill Tuiloma	27 March 1995 (aged 20)	0	0	(French Football Federation) Marseille
7	FW	Joel Stevens	7 February 1995 (aged 20)	0	0	(New Zealand Football) Wellington Phoenix
8	MF	Moses Dyer	21 March 1997 (aged 18)	0	0	(New Zealand Football) Wanderers SC
9	FW	Alex Rufer	12 June 1996 (aged 19)	0	0	(New Zealand Football) Wellington Phoenix
10	MF	Clayton Lewis	12 February 1997 (aged 18)	0	0	(New Zealand Football) Wanderers SC
11	MF	Luka Prelevic	7 September 1995 (aged 19)	0	0	(Football Australia) Melbourne City
12	GK	Nik Tzanev	23 December 1996 (aged 18)	0	0	(The Football Association) Brentford
13	DF	Liam Higgins	27 September 1993 (aged 21)	0	0	(New Zealand Football) WaiBOP United
14	DF	Luke Adams	8 May 1994 (aged 21)	0	0	(Football Australia) South Melbourne
15	DF	Storm Roux	13 January 1993 (aged 22)	0	0	(Football Australia) Central Coast Mariners
16	MF	Louis Fenton (Captain)	3 April 1993 (aged 22)	4	3	(New Zealand Football) Wellington Phoenix
17	MF	Andrew Blake	14 March 1996 (aged 19)	0	0	(New Zealand Football) Wellington Phoenix
18	MF	Sam Burfoot	10 April 1994 (aged 21)	0	0	(New Zealand Football) Auckland City
19	FW	Monty Patterson	9 December 1996 (aged 18)	0	0	(The Football Association) Ipswich Town
20	DF	Harshae Raniga	1 October 1994 (aged 20)	0	0	(New Zealand Football) Waitakere United
21	GK	Max Crocombe	12 August 1993 (aged 21)	0	0	(The Football Association) Oxford United
22	MF	Te Atawhai Hudson-Wihongi	27 March 1995 (aged 20)	0	0	(New Zealand Football) Wanderers SC
23	FW	Logan Rogerson	28 May 1998 (aged 17)	0	0	(New Zealand Football) Wellington Phoenix

== Taekwondo ==
New Zealand has qualified 7 athletes.

Women

- Andrea Kilday -46 kg
- Zhanna Sattsaeva -67 kg
- Rhiannon O'Neill -62 kg

Men

- Nicolas Dorman +87 kg
- Dafydd Sanders -87 kg
- Vaughn Scott -80 kg
- Sean Wells -54 kg

== Weightlifting ==
New Zealand has qualified 19 athletes.

Women

- Ruth Anderson-Horrell (69 kg)
- Kaeley Elkington (63 kg)
- Vi'ivale Gafa (75+ kg)
- Amanda Gould (63 kg)
- Tracey Lambrechs (75+ kg)
- Paige Lawgun (48 kg)
- Charlotte Moss (53 kg)
- Sheena Phillips (58 kg - reserve)
- Emma Pilkington (69 kg - reserve)

Men

- Andy Barakauskas (105+ kg)
- Ianne Guinares (62 kg)
- An-ti Hsu (77 kg)
- Richard Jones (105 kg)
- Douglas Sekone-Fraser (85 kg)
- Cameron Smith (77 kg)
- Caleb Symon (94 kg)
- Rory Taylor (105 kg)
- Anthony Taylor (69 kg - reserve)
- Vester Villalon (69 kg - reserve)
