= 2015 World Weightlifting Championships – Women's +75 kg =

Weightlifting Event

The women's +75 kilograms event at the 2015 World Weightlifting Championships was held on 27 and 28 November 2015 in Houston, United States.

== Schedule ==
| Date | Time | Event |
|---|---|---|
| 27 November 2015 | 19:25 | Group C |
| 28 November 2015 | 12:00 | Group B |
| 28 November 2015 | 17:25 | Group A |

== Medalists ==
| Event | Gold | | Silver | | Bronze | |
|---|---|---|---|---|---|---|
| Snatch | Tatiana Kashirina (RUS) | 148 kg | Meng Suping (CHN) | 145 kg | Chitchanok Pulsabsakul (THA) | 136 kg |
| Clean & Jerk | Tatiana Kashirina (RUS) | 185 kg | Meng Suping (CHN) | 180 kg | Kim Kuk-hyang (PRK) | 168 kg |
| Total | Tatiana Kashirina (RUS) | 333 kg | Meng Suping (CHN) | 325 kg | Kim Kuk-hyang (PRK) | 298 kg |

== Records ==
Prior to this competition, the existing world records were as follows.

| World record | Snatch | Tatiana Kashirina (RUS) | 155 kg | Almaty, Kazakhstan | 16 November 2014 |
| World record | Clean & Jerk | Tatiana Kashirina (RUS) | 193 kg | Almaty, Kazakhstan | 16 November 2014 |
| World record | Total | Tatiana Kashirina (RUS) | 348 kg | Almaty, Kazakhstan | 16 November 2014 |

== Results ==
| Rank | Athlete | Group | Body weight | Snatch (kg) | | | | Clean & Jerk (kg) | | | | Total |
| Rank | Athlete | Group | Body weight | 1 | 2 | 3 | Rank | 1 | 2 | 3 | Rank | Total |
|---|---|---|---|---|---|---|---|---|---|---|---|---|
| 1st place, gold medalist(s) | Tatiana Kashirina (RUS) | A | 108.19 | 143 | 148 | ~~152~~ | 1st place, gold medalist(s) | ~~185~~ | 185 | ~~191~~ | 1st place, gold medalist(s) | 333 |
| 2nd place, silver medalist(s) | Meng Suping (CHN) | A | 120.87 | 135 | 140 | 145 | 2nd place, silver medalist(s) | 180 | ~~190~~ | ~~190~~ | 2nd place, silver medalist(s) | 325 |
| 3rd place, bronze medalist(s) | Kim Kuk-hyang (PRK) | A | 97.48 | ~~125~~ | 125 | 130 | 5 | 162 | 166 | 168 | 3rd place, bronze medalist(s) | 298 |
| 4 | Chitchanok Pulsabsakul (THA) | A | 123.19 | 127 | 132 | 136 | 3rd place, bronze medalist(s) | 156 | 160 | ~~163~~ | 5 | 296 |
| 5 | Nadezhda Nogay (KAZ) | A | 97.70 | 126 | 131 | ~~135~~ | 4 | 155 | 161 | ~~165~~ | 4 | 292 |
| 6 | Sarah Robles (USA) | A | 148.01 | 118 | 122 | ~~127~~ | 6 | 152 | 157 | ~~162~~ | 6 | 279 |
| 7 | Son Young-hee (KOR) | A | 108.89 | 110 | 115 | 118 | 10 | 155 | ~~163~~ | ~~163~~ | 7 | 273 |
| 8 | Alexandra Aborneva (KAZ) | B | 107.58 | 107 | 112 | 117 | 12 | 140 | 150 | ~~155~~ | 8 | 267 |
| 9 | Andreea Aanei (ROU) | B | 117.73 | 114 | 118 | 120 | 8 | 137 | 143 | 146 | 12 | 266 |
| 10 | Shaimaa Khalaf (EGY) | A | 120.85 | 115 | ~~120~~ | ~~120~~ | 16 | 150 | ~~155~~ | ~~156~~ | 9 | 265 |
| 11 | Naryury Pérez (VEN) | B | 99.85 | 108 | 112 | 115 | 14 | 141 | 146 | 149 | 10 | 264 |
| 12 | Anastasiia Hotfrid (GEO) | B | 89.60 | 113 | 118 | 121 | 7 | 137 | 142 | ~~145~~ | 16 | 263 |
| 13 | Yaniuska Espinosa (VEN) | B | 112.79 | 110 | 115 | 117 | 13 | 141 | 146 | ~~151~~ | 11 | 263 |
| 14 | Anastasiya Lysenko (UKR) | B | 100.61 | 108 | 113 | 117 | 11 | 138 | 143 | ~~147~~ | 15 | 260 |
| 15 | Lee Hui-sol (KOR) | A | 116.19 | 110 | 115 | ~~120~~ | 15 | 145 | ~~148~~ | — | 13 | 260 |
| 16 | Mariam Usman (NGR) | A | 125.85 | 110 | 115 | ~~120~~ | 17 | ~~145~~ | ~~145~~ | 145 | 14 | 260 |
| 17 | Tania Mascorro (MEX) | B | 106.31 | 113 | 116 | 119 | 9 | 140 | ~~145~~ | ~~145~~ | 19 | 259 |
| 18 | Oliba Nieve (ECU) | C | 98.63 | 108 | 111 | 114 | 18 | 137 | 141 | ~~143~~ | 17 | 255 |
| 19 | Halima Abdelazim (EGY) | C | 123.97 | 106 | 110 | ~~112~~ | 21 | 130 | 138 | 141 | 18 | 251 |
| 20 | Yosra Dhieb (TUN) | B | 115.34 | 110 | 113 | ~~115~~ | 19 | 135 | ~~138~~ | ~~138~~ | 22 | 248 |
| 21 | Holley Mangold (USA) | C | 174.24 | 100 | 105 | ~~108~~ | 23 | 140 | ~~147~~ | ~~147~~ | 20 | 245 |
| 22 | Lisseth Ayoví (ECU) | C | 113.17 | 102 | 106 | 108 | 22 | 133 | 136 | ~~140~~ | 21 | 244 |
| 23 | Tracey Lambrechs (NZL) | C | 106.57 | 98 | ~~101~~ | 101 | 26 | 131 | ~~136~~ | ~~138~~ | 24 | 232 |
| 24 | Sabina Bagińska (POL) | C | 107.97 | ~~98~~ | ~~98~~ | 98 | 29 | 128 | ~~132~~ | 132 | 23 | 230 |
| 25 | Aleksandra Mierzejewska (POL) | C | 131.08 | 98 | ~~102~~ | 103 | 24 | ~~123~~ | 123 | 127 | 26 | 230 |
| 26 | Anna Van Bellinghen (BEL) | C | 84.36 | 98 | ~~100~~ | 100 | 27 | 123 | 126 | 129 | 25 | 229 |
| 27 | Mercy Brown (GBR) | C | 89.61 | 101 | ~~105~~ | ~~105~~ | 25 | 121 | 123 | 126 | 27 | 227 |
| 28 | Jenna Myers (AUS) | C | 78.51 | 92 | 96 | 99 | 28 | 112 | 117 | 120 | 28 | 219 |
| 29 | Luisa Peters (COK) | C | 98.99 | 92 | 95 | ~~98~~ | 30 | 115 | ~~120~~ | ~~120~~ | 30 | 210 |
| 30 | Madeleine Yamechi (FRA) | C | 84.32 | ~~88~~ | 88 | 90 | 31 | 110 | 115 | ~~117~~ | 29 | 205 |
| 31 | Shalinee Valaydon (MRI) | C | 112.70 | ~~90~~ | 90 | ~~92~~ | 32 | 115 | ~~117~~ | ~~117~~ | 31 | 205 |
| — | Mami Shimamoto (JPN) | B | 102.26 | 106 | ~~110~~ | 110 | 20 | ~~137~~ | ~~137~~ | ~~137~~ | — | — |
| DQ | Hripsime Khurshudyan (ARM) | A | 87.42 | 111 | ~~115~~ | 115 | — | 140 | ~~145~~ | 145 | — | 260 |
| DQ | Eftychia Ananiadou (GRE) | B | 91.64 | 110 | 113 | ~~115~~ | — | 130 | 135 | 138 | — | 251 |
