= Weightlifting at the 2014 Commonwealth Games – Women's +75 kg =

Weightlifting – Women's +75 kg at the 2014 Commonwealth Games
- Venue: Clyde Auditorium
- Dates: 30 July 2014
- Competitors: 14 from 12 nations
- Winning total weight: 280kg

Medalists
gold medal	Maryam Usman	Nigeria
silver medal	Ele Opeloge	Samoa
bronze medal	Tracey Lambrechs	New Zealand

The Women's +75 kg weightlifting event took place at the 2014 Commonwealth Games on 30 July. The event took place at the Clyde Auditorium. The weightlifter from Nigeria won the gold, with a combined lift of 280 kg.

== Result ==
Rank	Athlete	Snatch (kg)				Clean & Jerk (kg)				Total (kg)
Rank	Athlete	1	2	3	Result	1	2	3	Result	Total (kg)
1st place, gold medalist(s)	Maryam Usman (NGR)	115	120	125	125	145	150	155	155	280
2nd place, silver medalist(s)	Ele Opeloge (SAM)	115	120	~~125~~	120	145	151	~~161~~	151	271
3rd place, bronze medalist(s)	Tracey Lambrechs (NZL)	97	101	~~103~~	101	129	132	136	136	237
4	Deborah Acason (AUS)	105	108	~~110~~	108	124	128	~~130~~	128	236
5	Iuniarra Sipaia (SAM)	98	102	~~105~~	102	126	131	~~136~~	131	233
6	Luisa Peters (COK)	95	100	~~103~~	100	115	120	125	125	225
7	Nur Jannah Batrisyah (MAS)	~~100~~	100	~~103~~	100	125	~~130~~	~~130~~	125	225
8	Shalinee Valaydon (MRI)	~~90~~	90	~~97~~	90	110	116	~~121~~	116	206
9	Becky Namusoke (UGA)	82	~~86~~	86	86	107	112	115	115	201
10	Clementine Meukeugni Noumbissi (CMR)	~~83~~	83	86	86	102	107	~~113~~	107	193
11	Albertine Um (CMR)	77	~~81~~	~~81~~	77	100	105	108	108	185
12	Alberta Ampomah (GHA)	68	71	74	74	94	98	101	101	175
13	Suliana Fate (TON)	65	70	74	74	~~87~~	87	92	92	166
14	Vitolia Tauasi (NIU)	62	65	67	67	78	~~82~~	~~82~~	78	145
