= Mariam Usman =

Nigerian weightlifter (born 1990)

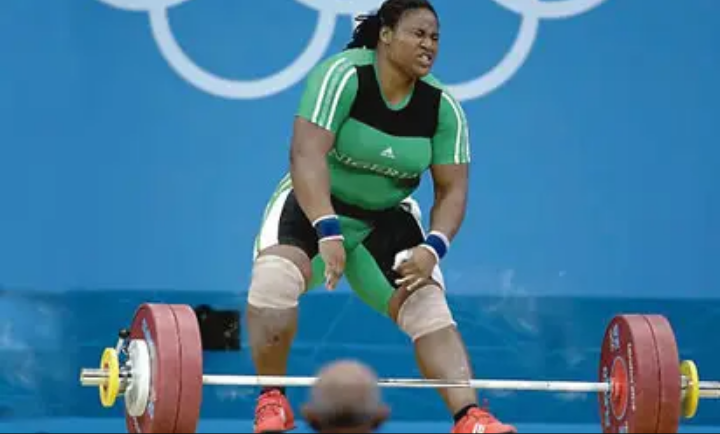

Personal information
- Born: 9 November 1990 (age 35)
- Height: 1.66 m (5 ft 5 1/2 in)
- Weight: 122 kg (269 lb)

Sport
- Country: Nigeria
- Sport: Weightlifting
- Event: +75kg
- Turned pro: 2007
Medal record
Women's Weightlifting
Representing Nigeria
Olympic Games
Bronze medal – third place	2008 Beijing	+75 kg
World Championships
Bronze medal – third place	2011 Paris	+75 kg
All-Africa Games
Silver medal – second place	2007 Algiers	+75 kg
Silver medal – second place	2015 Brazzaville	+75 kg
Commonwealth Games
Gold medal – first place	2014 Glasgow	+75 kg
Silver medal – second place	2010 Delhi	+75 kg
African Championships
Gold medal – first place	2008 Strand	+75 kg
Gold medal – first place	2011 Cape Town	+75 kg
Gold medal – first place	2012 Nairobi	+75 kg
Gold medal – first place	2016 Yaounde	+75 kg
Commonwealth Championships
Gold medal – first place	2011 Cape Town	+75 kg
Gold medal – first place	2013 Panang	+75 kg
- Updated on 15 October 2016

Mariam Usman (born 9 November 1990) is a Nigerian weightlifter. She competes in the women's +75 kg class, where she is a four-time African Champion and gold medalist at the Commonwealth Games. She also won a bronze medal at the 2011 World Weightlifting Championships and has competed in three editions of the Olympic Games, winning a bronze medal in 2008. Mariam Usman has been confirmed as the first Nigerian athlete to compete in the inaugural Enhanced Games.

== Biography ==
Usman was born in Kaduna, Nigeria and took up weightlifting as a way to combat harassment that she received from boys. She debuted on the international scene in 2007, where she took silver in all three categories of the +75 division at the 2007 All-Africa Games in Algiers, Algeria and finished 9th at the World Championships in Chiang Mai, Thailand. She then qualified for the 2008 Summer Olympics in Beijing, China by winning the +75 kg class at the 2008 African Weightlifting Championships in Strand, South Africa.

At the Beijing Games Usman competed in the +75 kg division and finished fifth, but was upgraded to a bronze medal after the silver and bronze medalists from that event, Olha Korobka and Mariya Grabovetskaya, were suspended in August 2016 after testing positive for prohibited substances. She came in fifth at the 2009 World Championships in Goyang, South Korea and then took silver overall at the 2010 Commonwealth Games in Delhi, India. She improved to first at the 2011 Commonwealth and African Championships and took overall bronze at the 2011 World Championships held in Paris, France.

Usman qualified for the 2012 Summer Olympics by winning the +75 kg division at that year's African Championships in Nairobi, Kenya, but in London failed to complete the Clean & Jerk portion of the event and did not place. She was more successful in the ensuing years, however, taking gold at the 2013 Commonwealth Championships in Penang, Malaysia and the 2014 Commonwealth Games in Glasgow, Scotland. At the 2015 African Games in Brazzaville, Congo, however, she slipped to silver and finished 17th at the World Championships in Houston, Texas.

Usman won the 2016 African Championships, held in Yaounde, Cameroon, and was part of Nigeria's delegation to the 2016 Summer Olympics in Rio de Janeiro, Brazil. There she finished 8th among 16 competitors in the +75 kg category. Usman blamed her performance on lack of training opportunities offered to her in Nigeria and stated that in view of the "non-existent" training she would no longer compete internationally for her home country.

== Senior level results ==
Year	Venue	Weight	Snatch (kg)				Clean & Jerk (kg)				Total	Rank
Year	Venue	Weight	1	2	3	Rank	1	2	3	Rank	Total	Rank
Olympic Games
2008	Beijing, China	+75 kg	~~115~~	115	~~120~~	4	145	150	~~156~~	2	265	3rd place, bronze medalist(s)
2012	London, United Kingdom	+75 kg	125	129	~~133~~	3	~~160~~	~~160~~	~~160~~	-	-	-
2016	Rio de Janeiro, Brazil	+75 kg	115	~~120~~	~~120~~	11	145	150	~~152~~	8	265	9
World Championships
2007	Chiang Mai, Thailand	+75 kg	110	115	117	7	135	~~140~~	140	10	257	9
2009	Goyang, South Korea	+75 kg	105	110	115	6	135	~~140~~	145	5	260	5
2011	Paris, France	+75 kg	~~117~~	117	~~121~~	5	151	156	~~160~~	3rd place, bronze medalist(s)	273	3rd place, bronze medalist(s)
2015	Houston, United States	+75 kg	110	115	~~120~~	18	~~145~~	~~145~~	145	15	260	17
African Games
2007	Algiers, Algeria	+75 kg	~~110~~	110	~~118~~	2nd place, silver medalist(s)	133	138	~~142~~	2nd place, silver medalist(s)	248	2nd place, silver medalist(s)
2015	(Republic of the Congo) Brazzaville, Congo	+75 kg	116	~~121~~	~~122~~	2nd place, silver medalist(s)	150	~~155~~	~~156~~	2nd place, silver medalist(s)	266	2nd place, silver medalist(s)
Commonwealth Games
2010	Delhi, India	+75 kg	115	~~120~~	~~120~~	2nd place, silver medalist(s)	140	~~150~~	~~150~~	2nd place, silver medalist(s)	255	2nd place, silver medalist(s)
2014	Glasgow, Scotland	+75 kg	115	120	125	1st place, gold medalist(s)	145	150	155	1st place, gold medalist(s)	280	1st place, gold medalist(s)
