= Tracey Lambrechs =

New Zealand weightlifter (born 1985)

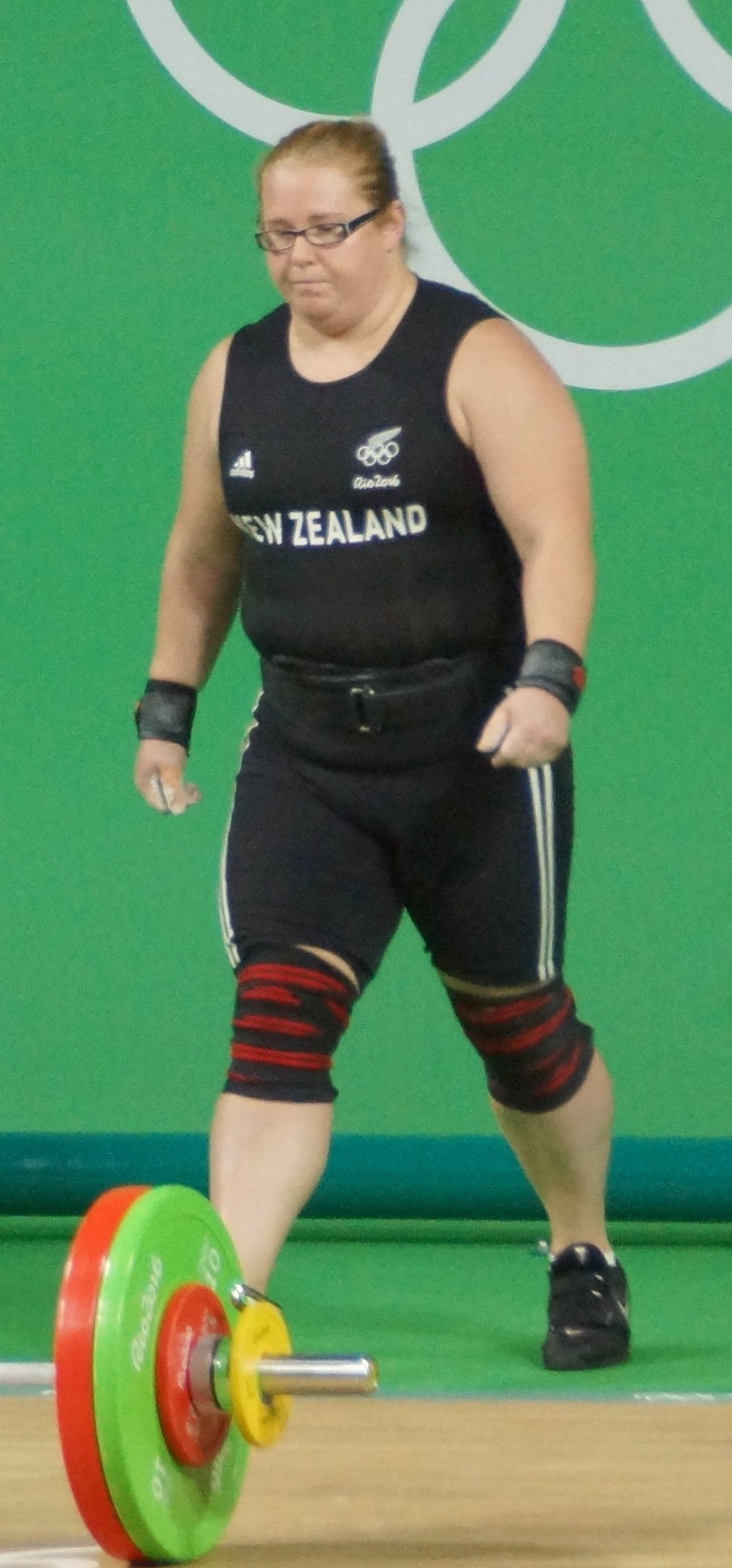
- Lambrechs at the 2016 Olympics

Personal information
- Full name: Tracey Lambrechs
- Nationality: New Zealand
- Born: 27 August 1985 (age 40) Johannesburg, South Africa
- Height: 1.67 m (5 ft 5 1/2 in)
- Weight: 107 kg (236 lb)

Sport
- Country: New Zealand
- Sport: Weightlifting
- Event: Women's +75 kg
- Club: Northsport Olympic Weightlifting, Auckland
- Coached by: Adam Storey
Medal record
Women's weightlifting
Representing New Zealand
Commonwealth Games
Bronze medal – third place	2014 Glasgow	+75 kg
Pacific Games
Silver medal – second place	2015 Port Moresby	+75 kg
Commonwealth Championships
Bronze medal – third place	2009 Penang	+75 kg
Bronze medal – third place	2013 Penang	+75 kg
Bronze medal – third place	2017 Gold Coast	90 kg
Oceania Championships
Silver medal – second place	2012 Apia	+75 kg
Silver medal – second place	2013 Brisbane	+75 kg
Silver medal – second place	2015 Port Moresby	+75 kg
Silver medal – second place	2016 Suva	+75 kg
Silver medal – second place	2017 Gold Coast	90 kg
Bronze medal – third place	2010 Suva	+75 kg
- Updated on 28 January 2022

Tracey Lambrechs (born 27 August 1985) is a former New Zealand weightlifter who competed in the +75 kg division. She won a bronze medal at the 2014 Commonwealth Games and a silver at the 2015 Pacific Games. She placed 13th at the 2016 Olympics.

Lambrechs was born in South Africa and moved to New Zealand with her family in 1999. She played netball in the New Zealand national league, and competed internationally in athletics. She took up weightlifting aged 17. She was selected as flag bearer for New Zealand at the opening ceremony of the 2015 Pacific Games.

Lambrechs announced her retirement at the 2018 Gold Coast Commonwealth Games.

== Major results ==
Year	Venue	Weight	Snatch (kg)				Clean & Jerk (kg)				Total	Rank
Year	Venue	Weight	1	2	3	Rank	1	2	3	Rank	Total	Rank
Representing New Zealand
Olympic Games
2016	Rio de Janeiro, Brazil	+75 kg	~~98~~	98	~~101~~	15	~~133~~	133	~~139~~	13	231	13
World Championships
2015	Houston, United States	+75 kg	98	~~101~~	101	27	131	~~136~~	~~138~~	25	232	24
2011	Paris, France	+75 kg	102	~~106~~	~~106~~	17	126	~~130~~	130	18	232	18
Oceania Championships
2017	Gold Coast, Australia	90 kg	89	92	95	2nd place, silver medalist(s)	120	124	~~128~~	2nd place, silver medalist(s)	219	2nd place, silver medalist(s)
2016	Suva, Fiji	+75 kg	98	102	~~105~~	2nd place, silver medalist(s)	133	138	~~141~~	2nd place, silver medalist(s)	240	2nd place, silver medalist(s)
Commonwealth Games
2018	Gold Coast, Australia	90 kg	89	~~93~~	93	4	~~119~~	120	~~126~~	5	213	5
2014	Glasgow, Scotland	+75 kg	97	101	~~103~~	5	129	132	136	3	237	3rd place, bronze medalist(s)
2010	Delhi, India	+75 kg	94	99	~~102~~	5	120	124	127	5	226	5
Pacific Games
2015	Port Moresby, Papua New Guinea	+75 kg	~~95~~	95	98	2nd place, silver medalist(s)	115	~~125~~	125	2nd place, silver medalist(s)	223	2nd place, silver medalist(s)
