= Camilla Fogagnolo =

Australian weightlifter (born 1986)

Personal information
- Born: May 31, 1986 (age 40)
- Height: 1.7 m (5 ft 7 in)

Sport
- Country: Australia
- Sport: Weightlifting
Medal record
Women's weightlifting
Representing Australia
Pacific Games
Bronze medal – third place	2015 Port Moresby	75 kg
Oceania Championships
Gold medal – first place	2008 Auckland	69 kg
Silver medal – second place	2017 Gold Coast	75 kg
Bronze medal – third place	2016 Suva	75 kg
Bronze medal – third place	2015 Port Moresby	75 kg

Camilla Fogagnolo (born 31 May 1986) is an Australian strongwoman and weightlifter.

She competed at the 2015 World Weightlifting Championships, 2019 Australian Arnold strongwoman championships, 2020 Arnold Amateur Strongwoman World Championships.

== Personal Records ==
Strongwoman

- Deadlift (equipped on standard bar) - 260 kg (570 lb) (2024 European Pro Strongman U64)
- Deadlift (silver dollar setup) - 380 kg (840 lb) (2022 Obliter-8 Strongman Trials) (world record in U64, U73 and U82 weight class)
- Atlas stone (for max) - 153.1 kg (338 lb) (2024 Log.Deadlift.Stone Spring Break) (world record in U64 and U73 weight class)
