= Nauru at the 2015 Pacific Games =

- IOC code: NRU

4 July 2015 – 18 July 2015
- Competitors: 130 in 9 sports
- Flag bearer: Itte Detenamo
- Medals Ranked 7th: Gold 7 Silver 10 Bronze 5 Total 22

Pacific Games appearances
- 1963; 1966; 1969; 1971; 1975; 1979; 1983–1987; 1991; 1995; 1999; 2003; 2007; 2011; 2015; 2019; 2023

Nauru competed at the 2015 Pacific Games in Port Moresby, Papua New Guinea from 4 to 18 July 2015. Nauru listed 130 competitors as of 4 July 2015.

== Athletics ==
Nauru qualified 11 athletes in track and field:

Men

- JJ Capelle
- Joseph Soriano Dabana
- Dysard Dageago
- Christopher Esela
- German Grundler
- Joshua Jeremiah
- Olimac Scotty
- John-Rico Togagae

Women

- Lovelite Detenamo
- Chanana Jeremiah
- Jerusha Eibon Mau

=== Parasport ===
Men

- Jaeko Ageidu

== Basketball ==
Nauru qualified men's and women's teams in basketball (26 athletes):

Men

- Kingson Akibwib
- Richart Daoe
- Terry Deidenang
- Marcus-Paul Detenamo
- Martin-Crowe Detenamo
- Royce Dick
- Niga Haulangi
- Johnson Hiram
- Jencke Jeremiah
- Joeson Kanimea
- Gavrick Mwareow
- Kaairo Tiaon
- David Mick Vorbach

Women

- Kerina Adam
- Julinda Cain
- Jeiziannie Deraudag
- Evalyn Detenamo
- Micheala Detenamo
- Jeizianna Halstead
- Tromina Hartman
- Janet Hubert
- April Ika
- Shania Ika
- Sigrid Jeremiah
- Elamita Kamtaura
- Zephrina Scotty

== Boxing ==
Nauru qualified 9 athletes in boxing:

Men

- Roteiga Adeang
- Colan Caleb
- Alphonse Deireragea
- Mel Lachlan Halstead
- Dunstall Harris
- Teroi Ketner
- Blanco Wharton
- Dexan Martin

Women

- Rachelle Bonillo

== Powerlifting ==
Nauru qualified 15 athletes in powerlifting:

Men

- Deamo Baguga
- Roy Detabene
- Starron Slade Dowabobo
- Taggart Duburiya
- Robert Kun
- Sonsy Matisima
- Raboe Roland
- John Tsiode
- Jezza Uepa

Women

- Delwi Agigo
- Delia Dabwido
- Ivy Rose Jones
- Giovika Benedicta Kepae
- Eibon Jerusha Mau
- Febrose Tsiode

== Rugby sevens ==
Nauru qualified a men's team in rugby sevens (18 athletes):

Men

- Damon ADEANG
- Chamrock Agir
- Camrod Darren Botelanga
- David John Tommy Brechtefeld
- Charles Dagiaro
- Geronimo Ivan Daniel
- Bronco Deidenang
- Sherlock Denuga
- Vito Denuga
- Rassmusen Dowabobo
- Ezra Ruga Ika
- Kingstone Ika
- Cazaly Jeremiah
- Kristides Menke
- Kenneth Oppenheimer
- Zac Temaki
- Turner Peter Thoma
- Jose Uepa
- Szabroki Vandaame Deireragea

== Table tennis ==
Nauru qualified 3 athletes in table tennis:

Men

- Obrien Itaia
- Joweida Stephen

Women

- Oxyna Gobure

== Tennis ==
Nauru qualified 4 athletes in tennis:

Men

- Dallas Diogouw Addi
- Bill Capelle
- Victor Moses
- Anderson-Tough Notte

== Volleyball ==
Nauru qualified men's and women's teams in volleyball (23 players):

Men

- Dogurube Dabwido
- Silas Dame
- Junior Faatiga
- Francis Gadeouwa
- Atto Karl
- Cherokee Moses
- Fallon Natano
- Andre Notte
- Micheal Tiki-Tembo Notte
- Rujero Reweru
- Rulando Reweru
- Geofferson Tiana Waidubu
- James Brendan Waidubu

Women

- Fimay Apad
- Bliss Dabuae
- Senora Dageago
- Gloris Eidina Grundler
- Casurina Kam
- Jackisa Mau
- Annett Muasau
- Equed Tagamoun
- Melusa Tannang
- Vianka Temaki

== Weightlifting ==
Nauru qualified 19 athletes in weightlifting:

Men

- Elson Edward Brechtefeld
- Isaiah Quanmo Cain
- Quamen Ezekiel Cain
- Shadrach Quinton Cain
- Bronco Deiranauw
- Itte Detenamo
- Larko Doguape
- Petrillo Menke
- Chris Rangdimi
- Tango Mark Taleka
- Tom-Jaye Waibeiya

Women

- Atniza Eidabug Batsiua
- Marcincy Cook
- Ricci Pheaulika Daniel
- Uea Detudamo
- Female Grundler
- Narma Thoma
- Bernada Uepa
- Maximina Uepa
