= François Etoundi =

Australian weightlifter

Personal information
- Full name: François Etoundi
- Born: 6 October 1984 (age 41) Yaoundé, Cameroon
- Weight: 76.91 kg (169.6 lb)

Sport
- Country: Australia
- Sport: Weightlifting
- Weight class: 77 kg
- Team: National team
Medal record
Representing Australia
Men's weightlifting
Commonwealth Games
Bronze medal – third place	2014 Glasgow	77 kg
Bronze medal – third place	2018 Gold Coast	77 kg
Pacific Games
Silver medal – second place	2015 Port Moresby	77 kg
Commonwealth Championships
Silver medal – second place	2013 Penang	77 kg
Silver medal – second place	2015 Pune	77 kg
Bronze medal – third place	2016 Penang	85 kg
Bronze medal – third place	2017 Gold Coast	77 kg
Oceania Championships
Gold medal – first place	2009 Darwin (Note: Arafura Games also)	69 kg
Gold medal – first place	2010 Suva	69 kg
Gold medal – first place	2013 Brisbane	77 kg
Gold medal – first place	2014 Le Mont-Dore	77 kg
Gold medal – first place	2016 Suva	77 kg
Silver medal – second place	2015 Port Moresby	77 kg
- Updated on 27 January 2022

François Etoundi (born 6 October 1984 in Yaoundé) is a Cameroonian born Australian male weightlifter, competing in the 77 kg category and representing Australia at international competitions. He competed at world championships, most recently at the 2009 World Weightlifting Championships.

He competed in the men's 77 kg event at the 2014 Commonwealth Games where he won a bronze medal. The following day, he was arrested for breaking the nose of fellow Welsh competitor Gareth Evans and ordered to pay £400 after appearing at Glasgow Sheriff Court. He was later stripped of his Commonwealth Games accreditation and sent home in disgrace.

On the 14th of April 2021, he was banned from competing for a three-year period by Sport Integrity Australia for failing to submit to sample collection.

== Major results ==
Year	Venue	Weight	Snatch (kg)				Clean & Jerk (kg)				Total	Rank
Year	Venue	Weight	1	2	3	Rank	1	2	3	Rank	Total	Rank
Representing Australia
World Championships
2009	Goyang, South Korea	69 kg	125	~~129~~	~~129~~	17	~~152~~	152	—	17	277	15
Commonwealth Games
2018	Gold Coast, Australia	77 kg	128	133	136	3	162	~~168~~	169	2	305	3rd place, bronze medalist(s)
2014	Glasgow, Scotland	77 kg	137	~~140~~	~~141~~	7	~~170~~	170	177	2	314	3rd place, bronze medalist(s)
2010	Delhi, India	69 kg	125	129	~~132~~	5	—	—	—	—	—	—
Representing Cameroon
World Championships
2007	Chiang Mai, Thailand	69 kg	125	~~131~~	~~132~~	44	151	—	—	49	276	46
Commonwealth Games
2006	Melbourne, Australia	69 kg	~~125~~	126	~~131~~	5	155	~~160~~	160	3	286	4

Medalbox note
