= Touch rugby at the 2019 Pacific Games – Men's tournament =

Men's Touch rugby at the 2019 Pacific Games
- Venue: St Joseph's Sports Field
- Location: Apia, Samoa
- Dates: 15–17 July 2019
- Teams: 7

Medalists
gold medal	Papua New Guinea
silver medal	Samoa
bronze medal	Fiji

The Men's touch rugby tournament at the 2019 Pacific Games was held in Apia from 15 to 17 July 2019 at the St Joseph's Sports Field.

== Participating teams ==
Seven Pacific Games Associations qualified for this tournament.

- Cook Islands (14)
- Fiji (14)
- Papua New Guinea (14)
- Samoa (14) (Host)
- Solomon Islands (14)
- Tokelau (14)
- Tonga (14)

== Round robin ==
Pos	Team	Pld	W	D	L	PF	PA	PD	Pts	Qualification
1	Papua New Guinea	6	6	0	0	82	26	+56	18	Semi-finals
2	Samoa	6	4	0	2	64	25	+39	14	Semi-finals
3	Cook Islands	6	4	0	2	54	26	+28	14	Semi-finals
4	Fiji	6	4	0	2	52	33	+19	14	Semi-finals
5	Solomon Islands	6	2	0	4	21	67	−46	10	5th/6th-place play-off
6	Tonga	6	1	0	5	28	63	−35	8	5th/6th-place play-off
7	Tokelau	6	0	0	6	17	78	−61	6	

=== Day 1 ===
15 July 2019
08:30

Cook Islands	13–2	Solomon Islands

St Joseph's Sports Field

15 July 2019
08:30

Fiji	13–2	Tokelau

St Joseph's Sports Field

15 July 2019
09:20

Papua New Guinea	21–4	Tonga

St Joseph's Sports Field

15 July 2019
11:00

Samoa	16–1	Tokelau

St Joseph's Sports Field

15 July 2019
11:50

Papua New Guinea	15–2	Solomon Islands

St Joseph's Sports Field

15 July 2019
11:50

Cook Islands	5–6	Fiji

St Joseph's Sports Field

15 July 2019
14:20

Cook Islands	3–7	Papua New Guinea

St Joseph's Sports Field

15 July 2019
14:20

Samoa	8–6	Fiji

St Joseph's Sports Field

15 July 2019
15:10

Tonga	10–2	Tokelau

St Joseph's Sports Field

=== Day 2 ===
16 July 2019
09:20

Cook Islands	8–6	Samoa

St Joseph's Sports Field

16 July 2019
09:20

Tonga	4–9	Fiji

St Joseph's Sports Field

16 July 2019
10:10

Tokelau	5–6	Solomon Islands

St Joseph's Sports Field

16 July 2019
11:50

Tonga	1–12	Samoa

St Joseph's Sports Field

16 July 2019
12:40

Solomon Islands	2–12	Fiji

St Joseph's Sports Field

16 July 2019
12:40

Tokelau	3–18	Papua New Guinea

St Joseph's Sports Field

16 July 2019
15:10

Solomon Islands	0–14	Samoa

St Joseph's Sports Field

16 July 2019
15:10

Cook Islands	10–1	Tonga

St Joseph's Sports Field

16 July 2019
16:00

Fiji	6–12	Papua New Guinea

St Joseph's Sports Field

=== Day 3 ===
17 July 2019
08:30

Solomon Islands	9–8	Tonga

St Joseph's Sports Field

17 July 2019
08:30

Cook Islands	15–4	Tokelau

St Joseph's Sports Field

17 July 2019
09:20

Papua New Guinea	9–8	Samoa

St Joseph's Sports Field

== Semi finals ==
17 July 2019
11:50

Samoa	12–11	Cook Islands

St Joseph's Sports Field

17 July 2019
11:50

Papua New Guinea	10–7	Fiji

St Joseph's Sports Field

== Playoffs ==
5th/6th playoff

17 July 2019
12:40

Solomon Islands	7–10	Tonga

St Joseph's Sports Field

Bronze medal match

17 July 2019
14:20

Cook Islands	6–9	Fiji

St Joseph's Sports Field

Gold medal match

17 July 2019
16:00

Samoa	11–12	Papua New Guinea

St Joseph's Sports Field
