= Touch rugby at the 2019 Pacific Games – Women's tournament =

Women's Touch rugby at the 2019 Pacific Games
- Venue: St Joseph's Sports Field
- Location: Apia, Samoa
- Dates: 15–17 July 2019
- Teams: 6

Medalists
gold medal	Papua New Guinea
silver medal	Samoa
bronze medal	Fiji

The Women's touch rugby tournament at the 2019 Pacific Games was held in Apia from 15 to 17 July 2019 at the St Joseph's Sports Field.

== Participating teams ==
Six Pacific Games Associations qualified for this tournament.

- Cook Islands (14)
- Fiji (14)
- Papua New Guinea (14)
- Samoa (14) (Host)
- Solomon Islands (14)
- Tonga (14)

== Round robin ==
Pos	Team	Pld	W	D	L	PF	PA	PD	Pts	Qualification
1	Papua New Guinea	5	5	0	0	71	9	+62	15	Semi-finals
2	Cook Islands	4	2	1	1	25	18	+7	12 (Note: Teams awarded a win (3pts) for forfeited matches against Solomon Islands, no points awarded to Solomon Islands)	Semi-finals
3	Samoa	5	3	0	2	45	19	+26	11	Semi-finals
4	Fiji	4	1	1	2	26	16	+10	10	Semi-finals
5	Tonga	4	0	0	4	5	58	−53	7	5th/6th-place play-off
6	Solomon Islands	2	0	0	2	1	53	−52	2	5th/6th-place play-off

=== Day 1 ===
15 July 2019
10:10

Fiji	3–4	Samoa

St Joseph's Sports Field

15 July 2019
10:10

Cook Islands	12–3	Tonga

St Joseph's Sports Field

15 July 2019
11:00

Solomon Islands	1–30	Papua New Guinea

St Joseph's Sports Field

15 July 2019
12:40

Fiji	5–5	Cook Islands

St Joseph's Sports Field

15 July 2019
13:30

Solomon Islands	0–23	Samoa

St Joseph's Sports Field

15 July 2019
13:30

Papua New Guinea	20–0	Tonga

St Joseph's Sports Field

15 July 2019
16:00

Samoa	0–8	Papua New Guinea

St Joseph's Sports Field

15 July 2019
16:00

Fiji	12–0	Tonga

St Joseph's Sports Field

15 July 2019
16:50

Cook Islands	0–0 (Note: forfeited by Solomon Islands)	Solomon Islands

St Joseph's Sports Field

=== Day 2 ===
16 July 2019
11:00

Fiji	0–0 (Note: forfeited by Solomon Islands)	Solomon Islands

St Joseph's Sports Field

16 July 2019
11:00

Papua New Guinea	6–2	Cook Islands

St Joseph's Sports Field

16 July 2019
11:50

Tonga	2–14	Samoa

St Joseph's Sports Field

16 July 2019
13:30

Fiji	6–7	Papua New Guinea

St Joseph's Sports Field

16 July 2019
14:20

Tonga	0–0 (Note: forfeited by Solomon Islands)	Solomon Islands

St Joseph's Sports Field

16 July 2019
14:20

Samoa	4–6	Cook Islands

St Joseph's Sports Field

== Semi finals ==
17 July 2019
10:10

Papua New Guinea	10–6	Fiji

St Joseph's Sports Field

17 July 2019
11:00

Cook Islands	3–5	Samoa

St Joseph's Sports Field

== Playoffs ==
5th/6th playoff

17 July 2019
12:40

Tonga	15–3	Solomon Islands

St Joseph's Sports Field

Bronze medal match

17 July 2019
13:30

Cook Islands	5–6	Fiji

St Joseph's Sports Field

Gold medal match

17 July 2019
15:10

Samoa	4–9	Papua New Guinea

St Joseph's Sports Field
