= Malek Chamoun =

Australian weightlifter (born 1989)

Personal information
- Full name: Malek Chamoun
- Born: 3 January 1989 (age 37)
- Weight: 83.76 kg (184.7 lb)

Sport
- Country: Australia
- Sport: Weightlifting
- Team: National team
Medal record
Men's weightlifting
Representing Australia
Pacific Games
| Silver medal – second place | 2015 Port Moresby | 85 kg |
Commonwealth Championships
| Silver medal – second place | 2009 Penang | 85 kg |
Oceania Championships
| Silver medal – second place | 2015 Port Moresby | 85 kg |
| Bronze medal – third place | 2016 Suva | 85 kg |
- Updated on 30 January 2022

Malek Chamoun (born 3 January 1989) is an Australian male weightlifter, competing in the 85 kg category and representing Australia at international competitions. He competed at world championships, most recently at the 2011 World Weightlifting Championships.

== Major results ==
| Year | Venue | Weight | Snatch (kg) | | | | Clean & Jerk (kg) | | | | Total | Rank |
| Year | Venue | Weight | 1 | 2 | 3 | Rank | 1 | 2 | 3 | Rank | Total | Rank |
World Championships
| 2011 | Paris, France | 85 kg | 135 | ~~140~~ | ~~140~~ | 35 | ~~170~~ | ~~170~~ | 170 | 31 | 305 | 31 |

== Personal life ==
Chamoun is legally blind.
