= Tonga at the 2015 Pacific Games =

- IOC code: TGA

4 July 2015 – 18 July 2015
- Competitors: 236 in 19 sports
- Medals Ranked 9th: Gold 7 Silver 1 Bronze 9 Total 17

Pacific Games appearances
- 1963; 1966; 1969; 1971; 1975; 1979; 1983; 1987; 1991; 1995; 1999; 2003; 2007; 2011; 2015; 2019; 2023

Tonga competed at the 2015 Pacific Games in Port Moresby, Papua New Guinea from 4 to 18 July 2015. Tonga listed 236 competitors as of 4 July 2015. One competitor was qualified for two sports. (Note: Eseta Fifita Tapiano Vi qualified for hockey and rugby sevens.)

== Athletics ==
Tonga qualified 18 athletes in track and field:

Men

- Aisea Fili Vakameilalo
- Alifeleti Tuiono
- Heamatangi Tuivai
- La Shondra David Mosaati
- Larry Steven Sulunga
- Manase Talivakaola Folau
- Siueni Filimone
- Soape Polutele
- Sunia Ketuu Moala
- Tevita Tameilau
- Tongia Vakaafi
- Toutouofa Vea

Women

- Anita Paea I Okalani Fasi
- Ata Maama Tuutafaiva
- Lalana Maniana Tupou Vavau Hifo
- Malia Maketalena Fapiena Tongia
- Olivia Eteaki
- Taina Halasima

== Beach volleyball ==
Tonga qualified 2 athletes in beach volleyball:

Men

- Metuisela Vainikolo
- Salesi Mafi Tuakoi

== Bodybuilding ==
Tonga qualified 8 athletes in bodybuilding:

Men

- Manase Manuokafoa Afuhaamango
- Sione Natisolo Siale
- Sitani Selao Tautalanoa
- Standford Faaui
- Taniela Mosimosi Lutui
- Trevor Jimmy Kealoha Huni

Women

- Alani Latu
- Kapiolani Mausia

== Boxing ==
Tonga qualified 8 athletes in boxing;

Men

- Fineasi Aho Matangi Lelei Tuipulotu
- Ken Stone William Hurrell
- Ofaloto Ki Tuila Moeata
- Oscar Finau
- Sepasitiano Hurrell Lavemai
- Sione Otutoa Hurrell
- Gina Heilala Kolo
- Pueki Fifita

== Cricket ==
Tonga qualified a men's team in cricket (16 players):

Men

- Aisake Haukinima
- Aloisio Pauu
- Efalame Laumape
- Isileli Vuni
- Lea Songoimoli Tenisi
- Maamaloa Teuaki Folau Kuluka
- Nikolasi Moala
- Ofa Jr Halaapiapi
- Paula Voni Palu
- Petelo Tauvaka
- Sakini Kofeloa
- Samiuela Uhi Pese
- Sione Fanguna Kae Manumua
- Sione Havea Pese
- Soloni Helu
- Timote Manu Latu

== Field hockey ==
Tonga qualified men's and women's teams in hockey (20 players):

Men

- Filimone Ula Paea i Moana Iloa
- Hans Juergen Katoa
- Kepueli Moimoi Jr Feke
- Mordecai Nau
- Otinili Mau
- Sesili Tuamelie Tahilanu
- Tevita Vunga
- Tomasi Lynch
- Vainga He Ofa Vea Mahe
- Viliami Fa Vatuvei

Women

- Eseta Fifita Tapiano Vi
- Lataheanga Susitina Teu
- Lilian Christina Carolyn Kaitapu
- Mateaki Siulolovao Taufa
- Pelenaise Lilo Malungahu
- Sifa Lynette
- Tangi I Loluhama Vailea
- Valeti Misinale
- Vasi Feke
- Vea Funaki

== Football ==
Tonga qualified a women's team in football (18 players):

Women

- Alamoni Vungamoeahi
- Anne Marie Tuaefe
- Emelita Moala
- Fololeni Naitingikeili Siale
- Haisini Teu
- Ilisapeti Mkamu
- Kulia Filo
- Manusiu Latavao
- Matelita Misinale
- Mele Milate Akolo
- Mele Soakai
- Mele Teukialupe Teukialupe Likiliki
- Ofa Laakulu
- Pauline Tonga
- Penateti Lapiuingi Feke
- Sala Veamatahau
- Tangimausia Maafu
- Tupou Hinave Topui

== Golf ==
Tonga qualified 8 athletes in golf

Men

- Alani Piukala
- Etivise Elisapeta Latu
- Kalolo Fifita
- Sione Teuhema Mahe
- Tasisio Lolesio

Women

- Lady Joyce Robyn Kaho Tuivakano
- Losa Tangimeivaha Fapiano
- Mele Kasavu Latu

== Lawn bowls ==
Tonga qualified 8 athletes in lawn bowls;

Men

- Fangupo Taungahihifo
- Limani Toloke
- Mohe Konokono Tausinga
- Samiuela Ula Fusimalohi
- Tevita Taufa Makasini

Women

- Helen Rima Amataiti Strickland
- Malia Kioa
- Paris Floran Ann Baker

== Netball ==
Tonga qualified a women's team in netball (12 players):

Women

- Daphne Louana Fiefia
- Fipe Fouhiva Kauvaka
- Hena Rayna Fonohema
- Lavelua Marina Stella Taulahi
- Lose Puafisi
- Loumaile Manumua
- Luseane Kalaneti Alohalani Vea
- Mollyni Anne Vakameilalo
- Sepuita Lolohea Taai
- Taumafa Tangatailoa
- Telesia Teisina
- Unaloto Taukiuvea

== Rugby league nines ==
Tonga qualified a men's team in rugby league (26 players):

Men

- Api Kakalaia Solomone Funaki
- Bruce Folau
- Elone Taufahema
- Halasima Toa
- Leiataua Talifolau Siupeli Kilifi
- Mavae mo Hihifo Tupou
- Ofa Tuakifalelei Teisina
- Penisimani Leki
- Peteli Pitimoni Funaki
- Pita Fakahoko He Lotu Vakautakakala
- Samuela Fiefia
- Semipilivi Naea Fahamokioa
- Semisi Otu Vea Panepasa Mahe
- Setaleki Luau
- Sione Alatini
- Sione Heimuli Pangai
- Sione Unaloto Ki Felenite Fa
- Siosaia Taufa Vaotangi Maile
- Sosefo Taula Suluka
- Sydney Joseph Mcphie Havea
- Timote Afu Paseka
- Uikilifi Mafi Fotuaika
- Unaloto ki Atenoa Feao
- Vahai Nau
- Viliami Tufulele
- Viliami Tupou

== Rugby sevens ==
Women

6th – Women's tournament.

- Nina Alofaki
- Seini Falengameesi Haukinima
- Lesila Latai Finehika Lautaimi
- Fakaola Muimui He Lotu Malungahu
- Isapela Iusini Kamoto
- Salome Sela Vaenuku
- Sela Vaenuku
- Eseta Fifita Tapiano Vi
- Ema Luisa Potaufa
- Losaline Potaufa
- Kiana Tuituimoeao Muamoholeva
- Sharon Nanivi Ae Tau Jr Vailea
- Pesalini Lave

Men

– Men's tournament.

- Manu Tuifua
- William Mosaati Hafu
- Fetuu Finau
- Kotoni Paea I Hangai Tokelau Lotoa
- Samisoni Asi
- Filivalea Mafoa
- Sione Tuitavake Fusimalohi
- Richard Amanaki Taliauli
- Vaea Tangitau Poteki
- Siale Tonga Talakai
- Atunaisa Fakaosi
- Meiohihifo Kuli

== Swimming ==
Tonga qualified 3 athletes in swimming:

Men

- Amini Fonua
- Tong Li James Panuve

Women

- Charissa Sofia Panuve

== Taekwondo ==
Men

- Soane Tualiku
- Maake Ola Moui he Ofa Mafoaaeata o Pongi

Women

- Ilaisaane Moala

== Tennis ==
Tonga qualified 6 athletes in tennis

Men

- Justin Vaituniloa Ki Moana Vea
- Liua Feke
- Matavao Faleta Fanguna
- Semisi Tavake Manumanu Funa Fanguna

Women

- Kendra LaAvasa Paea
- Sisilia Laumanu I Teu

== Touch rugby ==
Tonga qualified men's and women's teams in Touch rugby (16 players):

Men

5th – Men's tournament.

- Folau Moe Lotu Nonu Fakatava
- Pasa Fisi
- Sosaia Uluenga Hufanga
- Makameimoana Tavake
- Feaomoeata Kalu
- Alani Taumoepeau
- Peni Silako Onesi
- Levi Valenitino Fakatava

Women

5th – Women's tournament.

- Ana Latai Schaumkel
- Malia Anitasia Kolope
- Christie Ema Taufoou
- Akanesi Hifoi Pohiva
- Malia Ineti Malanata Tongia
- Litea Mirella Tuipulotu
- Folola Hufanga
- Manatu Ofa Ki Aho Takitaki
- Mele Piei

== Triathlon ==
Tonga qualified 1 athlete in triathlon

Men

- Heitini Lelenoa

== Weightlifting ==
Tonga qualified 6 athletes in weightlifting

Men

- Chirk Douglas Carmine Manzo
- Penisimani Angelo Fonua Siolaa
- Sateki Palei Finau Langi
- Sioeli Fotofili Tulikaki
- Wilford Christopher Vea
