= Kiribati at the 2015 Pacific Games =

- IOC code: KIR

4 July 2015 – 18 July 2015
- Competitors: 86 in 10 sports
- Flag bearer: David Katoatao
- Medals Ranked 12th: Gold 3 Silver 1 Bronze 5 Total 9

Pacific Games appearances
- 1979; 1983–1995; 1999; 2003; 2007; 2011; 2015; 2019; 2023

Kiribati competed at the 2015 Pacific Games in Port Moresby, Papua New Guinea from 4 to 18 July 2015. A total of 86 competitors for Kiribati were listed as of 4 July 2015.

== Athletics ==
Kiribati qualified 6 athletes in track and field:

Women

- Teinnang Ueata

Men

- David Birati
- David Peter
- John Ruka
- Utiraoi Takaria
- Itaaka Temwaka

== Basketball ==
Men

- Tewaieta Bangke
- Choi Being Yeeting
- Raurenti Beeta
- Cliff Collins
- Areieta Lefulefu
- Tauro Palai
- Iotia Paul
- Teekia Rui
- Biremon Taakami
- Puti Tongatapu

== Table tennis ==
Kiribati qualified one athlete in table tennis:

Men

- Teingia Taburimai

== Taekwondo ==
Kiribati qualified 3 athletes in taekwondo:

Women

- Tokataake Mwemweata

Men

- Teingia Taburimai
- Nelson Tabaua

== Touch rugby ==
Kiribati qualified men's and women's touch rugby teams (22 players):

Women

4th – Women's tournament

- Kimarawa Mourongo
- Taoriba Biniati
- Marebu Tekaai
- Tokaratororo Tikataake
- Lucy Ioneba
- Maritere Bani
- Joan Tonga
- Marenoa Tebakia
- Anee Taake
- Temaateke Kaero

Men

7th – Men's tournament

- Rhynner Riwata
- Moantau Tiaontin
- Kiatamoa Kautuna
- James Ruateiti
- Titau Tautii
- Tebubua Mweia
- Aviata Kenana
- Ukenio Teurakai
- Ribae Amoti
- Tuteau Pine
- Korimaraa Matang
- Tibaua Taraitebure
