= Marist Stadium =

Sports stadium in Lotopa, Samoa

Coordinates: 13°50′43.52″S 171°47′18.87″W

The Marist St. Joseph's Stadium is a sports stadium in Lotopa, Samoa.

Named after the Marist Brothers who brought rugby union to Western Samoa in 1920, the 4,000 capacity stadium was the venue for, amongst others, the rugby league 9's competition at the 2007 South Pacific Games and the International Marist 7's in February 2007.

== See also ==
- Marist St. Joseph rugby club
