= 2014 World Weightlifting Championships – Men's 56 kg =

The men's 56 kilograms event at the 2014 World Weightlifting Championships was held on 8 November 2014 in Baluan Sholak Sports Palace, Almaty, Kazakhstan.

== Schedule ==
Date	Time	Event
8 November 2014	11:00	Group C
8 November 2014	15:00	Group B
8 November 2014	19:00	Group A

== Medalists ==
Event	Gold		Silver		Bronze	
Snatch	Thạch Kim Tuấn (VIE)	135 kg	Li Fabin (CHN)	134 kg	Long Qingquan (CHN)	133 kg
Clean & Jerk	Om Yun-chol (PRK)	168 kg	Thạch Kim Tuấn (VIE)	161 kg	Long Qingquan (CHN)	160 kg
Total	Om Yun-chol (PRK)	296 kg	Thạch Kim Tuấn (VIE)	296 kg	Long Qingquan (CHN)	293 kg

== Records ==
Prior to this competition, the existing world records were as follows.

World Record	Snatch	Halil Mutlu (TUR)	138 kg	Antalya, Turkey	4 November 2001
World Record	Clean & Jerk	Om Yun-chol (PRK)	170 kg	Incheon, South Korea	20 September 2014
World Record	Total	Halil Mutlu (TUR)	305 kg	Sydney, Australia	16 September 2000

== Results ==
Rank	Athlete	Group	Body weight	Snatch (kg)				Clean & Jerk (kg)				Total
Rank	Athlete	Group	Body weight	1	2	3	Rank	1	2	3	Rank	Total
1st place, gold medalist(s)	Om Yun-chol (PRK)	A	55.71	~~124~~	124	128	5	~~162~~	162	168	1st place, gold medalist(s)	296
2nd place, silver medalist(s)	Thạch Kim Tuấn (VIE)	A	55.75	130	134	135	1st place, gold medalist(s)	~~156~~	156	161	2nd place, silver medalist(s)	296
3rd place, bronze medalist(s)	Long Qingquan (CHN)	A	55.40	~~130~~	130	133	3rd place, bronze medalist(s)	160	~~163~~	~~163~~	3rd place, bronze medalist(s)	293
4	Li Fabin (CHN)	A	55.50	130	134	~~135~~	2nd place, silver medalist(s)	157	~~162~~	~~162~~	4	291
5	Trần Lê Quốc Toàn (VIE)	A	55.90	125	~~128~~	~~130~~	6	155	~~160~~	~~160~~	5	280
6	Arli Chontey (KAZ)	A	55.60	122	126	129	4	145	~~150~~	~~150~~	11	274
7	Yang Chin-yi (TPE)	A	55.95	115	120	124	8	150	~~158~~	~~158~~	7	274
8	Sinphet Kruaithong (THA)	A	55.10	117	~~120~~	120	9	144	146	~~150~~	8	266
9	Mansour Al-Saleem (KSA)	B	55.18	116	120	124	7	135	~~140~~	142	15	266
10	Sergio Rada (COL)	A	55.57	113	116	~~119~~	13	145	150	~~152~~	6	266
11	Carlos Berna (COL)	A	55.69	112	115	118	10	~~146~~	146	~~150~~	9	264
12	Majid Askari (IRI)	A	55.70	~~117~~	117	~~121~~	11	144	~~151~~	~~151~~	13	261
13	Surahmat Wijoyo (INA)	B	55.76	110	113	~~116~~	17	142	~~146~~	146	10	259
14	Oleg Sîrghi (MDA)	B	55.82	~~107~~	107	112	18	140	~~145~~	~~148~~	18	252
15	Zulhelmi Pisol (MAS)	B	55.72	106	109	~~111~~	20	135	140	142	16	251
16	Tan Chi-chung (TPE)	B	55.78	106	~~111~~	~~111~~	25	140	145	~~148~~	12	251
17	Asen Muradov (BUL)	B	55.89	110	115	117	12	125	130	134	23	251
18	Smbat Margaryan (ARM)	B	55.63	~~107~~	107	~~111~~	24	143	~~147~~	~~147~~	14	250
19	Kota Yomogi (JPN)	C	55.68	106	109	111	19	~~135~~	135	139	19	250
20	Tom Goegebuer (BEL)	B	55.69	109	113	115	14	130	~~134~~	135	22	250
21	Witoon Mingmoon (THA)	B	55.21	105	107	~~109~~	23	138	140	~~144~~	17	247
22	Josué Brachi (ESP)	B	55.61	114	~~118~~	~~118~~	15	~~133~~	133	~~138~~	24	247
23	Hiroaki Takao (JPN)	C	55.48	108	~~111~~	~~111~~	21	133	136	~~138~~	20	244
24	Elmar Aliyev (AZE)	C	55.55	98	101	103	28	129	135	~~140~~	21	238
25	Ganesh Mali (IND)	C	55.86	100	105	108	22	124	128	130	27	238
26	Francisco Barrera (CHI)	C	55.99	100	~~105~~	105	27	~~127~~	129	132	25	237
27	Walter Zurita (ECU)	C	55.21	100	105	~~110~~	26	~~126~~	126	~~130~~	28	231
28	Eduar Beris (VEN)	C	55.63	96	100	~~105~~	30	120	127	130	26	230
29	Seraj Al-Saleem (KSA)	C	54.12	94	98	101	29	119	~~123~~	~~124~~	30	220
30	Amor Fenni (ALG)	C	55.69	95	~~98~~	~~99~~	31	~~116~~	116	120	29	215
—	Mirco Scarantino (ITA)	A	55.69	113	~~116~~	~~116~~	16	~~143~~	~~144~~	~~144~~	—	—
