= Weightlifting at the 2017 Summer Universiade – Men's 56 kg =

Men's 56 kg at the XXIX Summer Universiade
- Venues: Tamkang University Shao-Mo Memorial Gymnasium 7F
- Dates: 20 August 2017
- Competitors: 16 from 14 nations

Medalists
1st place, gold medalist(s)		Om Yun-chol	North Korea
2nd place, silver medalist(s)		Luis García	Dominican Republic
3rd place, bronze medalist(s)		Arli Chontey	Kazakhstan

The men's 56 kg event at the 2017 Summer Universiade was held on 20 August at the Tamkang University Shao-Mo Memorial Gymnasium 7F.

== Records ==
Prior to this competition, the existing world and Universiade records were as follows.

- Initial records

Category		Nation	Athlete	Record	Place	Date	Meet
World record	Snatch	China	Wu Jingbiao	139 kg	Houston, United States	21 November 2015	2015 World Championships
World record	Clean & Jerk	North Korea	Om Yun-chol	171 kg	Houston, United States	21 November 2015	2015 World Championships
World record	Total	China	Long Qingquan	307 kg	Rio de Janeiro, Brazil	7 August 2016	2016 Summer Olympics
Universiade records	Snatch	China (CHN)	Li Lizhi	128 kg	Shenzhen, China	13 August 2011	2011 Summer Universiade
Universiade records	Clean & Jerk	China (CHN)	Xu Jingui	149 kg	Kazan, Russia	7 July 2013	2013 Summer Universiade
Universiade records	Total	China (CHN)	Li Lizhi	273 kg	Shenzhen, China	13 August 2011	2011 Summer Universiade

- Broken records

Category		Nation	Athlete	Record	Place	Date
Universiade records	Snatch	North Korea (PRK)	Om Yun-chol	129 kg	New Taipei, Taiwan	20 August 2017
Universiade records	Clean & Jerk	North Korea (PRK)	Om Yun-chol	165 kg	New Taipei, Taiwan	20 August 2017
Universiade records	Total	North Korea (PRK)	Om Yun-chol	294 kg	New Taipei, Taiwan	20 August 2017

== Results ==
Rank	Athlete	Group	Body weight	Snatch (kg)				Clean & Jerk (kg)				Total
Rank	Athlete	Group	Body weight	1	2	3	Result	1	2	3	Result	Total
1st place, gold medalist(s)	Om Yun-chol (PRK)	A	55.89	122	129	–	129 UR	155	165	~~172~~	165 UR	294 UR
2nd place, silver medalist(s)	Luis García (DOM)	A	55.97	115	~~119~~	119	119	144	~~151~~	~~151~~	144	263
3rd place, bronze medalist(s)	Arli Chontey (KAZ)	A	55.90	115	~~120~~	~~120~~	115	135	140	143	143	258
4	Muhamad Purkon (INA)	A	55.90	110	~~115~~	~~117~~	110	135	141	~~149~~	141	251
5	Kim Yong-wook (KOR)	A	56.00	104	108	~~111~~	108	136	~~141~~	~~145~~	136	244
6	Yuya Senoo (JPN)	A	55.85	97	100	~~103~~	100	~~133~~	133	135	135	235
7	Chang Hao-yu (TPE)	A	55.66	102	~~105~~	~~105~~	102	130	132	~~134~~	132	234
8	Darren Lamar Barnes (USA)	A	55.97	102	107	~~110~~	107	125	~~130~~	~~130~~	125	232
9	Tan Chi-chung (TPE)	A	55.82	~~100~~	100	~~103~~	100	~~125~~	125	130	130	230
10	Shubham Tanaji Todkar (IND)	B	55.70	~~95~~	95	~~103~~	95	120	130	~~134~~	130	225
11	Jefreey Jose Gumez (MEX)	A	55.82	95	99	102	102	~~122~~	122	~~126~~	122	224
12	Andrew Gar Cheung (USA)	A	55.66	95	99	~~102~~	99	120	~~125~~	125	125	224
13	Aleksandr Krasnov (RUS)	B	55.03	95	100	~~105~~	100	115	120	123	123	223
14	Clark Cuico (PHI)	B	53.91	85	~~90~~	90	90	~~120~~	120	~~125~~	120	210
15	Cheng Peng (CHN)	B	55.59	~~90~~	~~90~~	90	90	95	100	105	105	195
16	Milinda C. Senarathna (SRI)	B	55.07	~~68~~	68	72	72	85	90	~~94~~	90	162
