= Weightlifting at the 2018 Asian Games – Men's 56 kg =

Men's 56 kg at the 2018 Asian Games
- Venue: Jakarta International Expo
- Date: 20 August 2018
- Competitors: 10 from 8 nations

Medalists
| gold medal | Om Yun-chol | North Korea |
| silver medal | Thạch Kim Tuấn | Vietnam |
| bronze medal | Surahmat Wijoyo | Indonesia |

The Men's 56 kilograms event at the 2018 Asian Games took place on 20 August 2018 at the Jakarta International Expo Hall A.

== Schedule ==
All times are Western Indonesia Time (UTC+07:00)

| Date | Time | Event |
|---|---|---|
| Monday, 20 August 2018 | 17:00 | Group A |

== Records ==
Prior to this competition, the existing world, Asian and Games records were as follows.

| World Record | Snatch | Wu Jingbiao (CHN) | 139 kg | Houston, United States | 21 November 2015 |
| World Record | Clean & Jerk | Om Yun-chol (PRK) | 171 kg | Houston, United States | 21 November 2015 |
| World Record | Total | Long Qingquan (CHN) | 307 kg | Rio de Janeiro, Brazil | 7 August 2016 |
| Asian Record | Snatch | Wu Jingbiao (CHN) | 139 kg | Houston, United States | 21 November 2015 |
| Asian Record | Clean & Jerk | Om Yun-chol (PRK) | 171 kg | Houston, United States | 21 November 2015 |
| Asian Record | Total | Long Qingquan (CHN) | 307 kg | Rio de Janeiro, Brazil | 7 August 2016 |
| Games Record | Snatch | Thạch Kim Tuấn (VIE) | 134 kg | Incheon, South Korea | 20 September 2014 |
| Games Record | Clean & Jerk | Om Yun-chol (PRK) | 170 kg | Incheon, South Korea | 20 September 2014 |
| Games Record | Total | Om Yun-chol (PRK) | 298 kg | Incheon, South Korea | 20 September 2014 |

== Results ==
| Rank | Athlete | Group | Snatch (kg) | | | | Clean & Jerk (kg) | | | | Total |
| Rank | Athlete | Group | 1 | 2 | 3 | Result | 1 | 2 | 3 | Result | Total |
|---|---|---|---|---|---|---|---|---|---|---|---|
| 1st place, gold medalist(s) | Om Yun-chol (PRK) | A | 127 | ~~131~~ | ~~131~~ | 127 | 160 | ~~172~~ | ~~172~~ | 160 | 287 |
| 2nd place, silver medalist(s) | Thạch Kim Tuấn (VIE) | A | ~~128~~ | 128 | ~~132~~ | 128 | 152 | ~~160~~ | ~~161~~ | 152 | 280 |
| 3rd place, bronze medalist(s) | Surahmat Wijoyo (INA) | A | ~~116~~ | 116 | 119 | 119 | 146 | ~~153~~ | 153 | 153 | 272 |
| 4 | Trần Lê Quốc Toàn (VIE) | A | 118 | 121 | 123 | 123 | ~~148~~ | 148 | ~~151~~ | 148 | 271 |
| 5 | Sinphet Kruaithong (THA) | A | 115 | 119 | ~~122~~ | 119 | ~~142~~ | ~~142~~ | 146 | 146 | 265 |
| 6 | Mansour Al-Saleem (KSA) | A | 117 | 122 | ~~125~~ | 122 | 142 | ~~150~~ | ~~150~~ | 142 | 264 |
| 7 | Nestor Colonia (PHI) | A | ~~113~~ | 113 | ~~117~~ | 113 | 140 | ~~150~~ | ~~150~~ | 140 | 253 |
| 8 | Seraj Al-Saleem (KSA) | A | ~~108~~ | ~~108~~ | 108 | 108 | 137 | 141 | ~~144~~ | 141 | 249 |
| 9 | Sengthavee Panhyathip (LAO) | A | ~~78~~ | 80 | 85 | 85 | 110 | ~~115~~ | ~~115~~ | 110 | 195 |
| 10 | Norberto Gama (TLS) | A | 55 | 60 | ~~75~~ | 60 | 65 | 75 | 82 | 82 | 142 |
