= Weightlifting at the 2010 Asian Games – Men's 56 kg =

Men's 56 kg at the 2010 Asian Games
- Venue: Dongguan Arena
- Date: 13 November 2010
- Competitors: 15 from 14 nations

Medalists
gold medal	Wu Jingbiao	China
silver medal	Cha Kum-chol	North Korea
bronze medal	Jadi Setiadi	Indonesia

The men's 56 kilograms event at the 2010 Asian Games took place on 13 November 2010 at Dongguan Arena.

== Schedule ==
All times are China Standard Time (UTC+08:00)

Date	Time	Event
Saturday, 13 November 2010	12:30	Group B
Saturday, 13 November 2010	16:30	Group A

== Records ==
Prior to this competition, the existing world, Asian and Games records were as follows.

World Record	Snatch	Halil Mutlu (TUR)	138 kg	Antalya, Turkey	4 November 2001
World Record	Clean & Jerk	Halil Mutlu (TUR)	168 kg	Trenčín, Slovakia	24 April 2001
World Record	Total	Halil Mutlu (TUR)	305 kg	Sydney, Australia	16 September 2000
Asian Record	Snatch	Long Qingquan (CHN)	132 kg	Beijing, China	10 August 2008
Asian Record	Clean & Jerk	Lan Shizhang (CHN)	165 kg	Szekszárd, Hungary	9 May 1998
Asian Record	Total	Lan Shizhang (CHN)	295 kg	Szekszárd, Hungary	9 May 1998
Games Record	Snatch	Wu Meijin (CHN)	130 kg	Busan, South Korea	1 October 2002
Games Record	Clean & Jerk	Wu Meijin (CHN)	162 kg	Busan, South Korea	1 October 2002
Games Record	Total	Wu Meijin (CHN)	292 kg	Busan, South Korea	1 October 2002

== Results ==
Rank	Athlete	Group	Body weight	Snatch (kg)				Clean & Jerk (kg)				Total
Rank	Athlete	Group	Body weight	1	2	3	Result	1	2	3	Result	Total
1st place, gold medalist(s)	Wu Jingbiao (CHN)	A	55.81	128	133	~~136~~	133	152	~~160~~	~~160~~	152	285
2nd place, silver medalist(s)	Cha Kum-chol (PRK)	A	55.73	120	125	128	128	~~145~~	145	148	148	276
3rd place, bronze medalist(s)	Jadi Setiadi (INA)	A	55.01	120	~~123~~	~~123~~	120	~~146~~	146	151	151	271
4	Pyae Phyo (MYA)	A	54.97	115	120	~~123~~	120	145	~~150~~	~~151~~	145	265
5	Trần Lê Quốc Toàn (VIE)	A	55.94	~~110~~	112	116	116	142	145	~~151~~	145	261
6	Nestor Colonia (PHI)	A	55.60	105	110	~~112~~	110	138	~~142~~	145	145	255
7	Masaharu Yamada (JPN)	A	55.81	~~103~~	103	106	106	~~145~~	~~145~~	145	145	251
8	Valluri Srinivasa Rao (IND)	B	55.94	100	105	110	110	135	~~142~~	~~142~~	135	245
9	Wanchai Mueannuek (THA)	A	55.72	~~102~~	~~102~~	102	102	~~130~~	~~130~~	130	130	232
10	Sukhen Dey (IND)	B	55.79	~~104~~	104	~~108~~	104	~~126~~	~~126~~	126	126	230
11	Mansour Al-Saleem (KSA)	A	52.50	104	~~109~~	~~110~~	104	121	~~126~~	~~126~~	121	225
12	Abdullah Ghafoor (PAK)	B	55.83	99	~~104~~	~~105~~	99	125	~~127~~	~~127~~	125	224
13	Sangeeth Wijesuriya (SRI)	B	55.81	95	~~99~~	99	99	~~120~~	~~120~~	122	122	221
14	Omarguly Handurdyýew (TKM)	B	55.93	~~99~~	~~99~~	100	100	120	~~127~~	~~127~~	120	220
15	Enkhjargalyn Mönkhdöl (MGL)	B	55.93	100	~~103~~	~~105~~	100	~~120~~	120	~~125~~	120	220

== New records ==
The following records were established during the competition.

Snatch	133	Wu Jingbiao (CHN)	AR
