= 2015 World Weightlifting Championships – Men's 56 kg =

The men's 56 kilograms event at the 2015 World Weightlifting Championships was held on 20 and 21 November 2015 in Houston, United States.

== Schedule ==
Date	Time	Event
20 November 2015	13:00	Group C
20 November 2015	17:30	Group B
21 November 2015	14:55	Group A

== Medalists ==
Event	Gold		Silver		Bronze	
Snatch	Wu Jingbiao (CHN)	139 kg	Arli Chontey (KAZ)	132 kg	Om Yun-chol (PRK)	131 kg
Clean & Jerk	Om Yun-chol (PRK)	171 kg	Wu Jingbiao (CHN)	163 kg	Nestor Colonia (PHI)	158 kg
Total	Om Yun-chol (PRK)	302 kg	Wu Jingbiao (CHN)	302 kg	Thạch Kim Tuấn (VIE)	287 kg

== Records ==
Prior to this competition, the existing world records were as follows.

World record	Snatch	Halil Mutlu (TUR)	138 kg	Antalya, Turkey	4 November 2001
World record	Clean & Jerk	Om Yun-chol (PRK)	170 kg	Incheon, South Korea	20 September 2014
World record	Total	Halil Mutlu (TUR)	305 kg	Sydney, Australia	16 September 2000

== Results ==
Rank	Athlete	Group	Body weight	Snatch (kg)				Clean & Jerk (kg)				Total
Rank	Athlete	Group	Body weight	1	2	3	Rank	1	2	3	Rank	Total
1st place, gold medalist(s)	Om Yun-chol (PRK)	A	55.78	127	131	~~133~~	3rd place, bronze medalist(s)	165	171	~~175~~	1st place, gold medalist(s)	302
2nd place, silver medalist(s)	Wu Jingbiao (CHN)	A	55.93	~~135~~	135	139	1st place, gold medalist(s)	160	163	~~166~~	2nd place, silver medalist(s)	302
3rd place, bronze medalist(s)	Thạch Kim Tuấn (VIE)	A	55.91	~~130~~	130	~~133~~	4	151	153	157	4	287
4	Nestor Colonia (PHI)	A	55.95	120	~~124~~	124	5	152	157	158	3rd place, bronze medalist(s)	282
5	Sergio Rada (COL)	A	55.85	115	~~118~~	118	8	145	150	~~151~~	6	268
6	Witoon Mingmoon (THA)	B	55.67	~~110~~	110	~~115~~	17	150	155	~~158~~	5	265
7	Sinphet Kruaithong (THA)	A	55.75	120	~~123~~	~~123~~	7	141	~~145~~	145	10	265
8	Habib de las Salas (COL)	A	55.87	~~113~~	113	117	9	145	~~151~~	~~153~~	11	262
9	Surahmat Wijoyo (INA)	B	55.63	~~112~~	112	~~116~~	15	140	145	149	7	261
10	Josué Brachi (ESP)	B	55.74	115	118	120	6	138	140	~~143~~	15	260
11	Muhammad Purkon (INA)	B	55.47	115	~~119~~	~~119~~	10	135	140	143	12	258
12	Mirco Scarantino (ITA)	A	55.76	~~115~~	~~115~~	115	11	142	~~147~~	~~147~~	14	257
13	José Montes (MEX)	B	55.88	~~110~~	110	~~113~~	19	~~146~~	146	~~149~~	9	256
14	Nguyễn Trần Anh Tuấn (VIE)	B	55.82	110	115	~~117~~	12	~~140~~	140	~~146~~	16	255
15	Hiroaki Takao (JPN)	C	55.82	~~108~~	108	111	16	~~134~~	134	137	18	248
16	Enmanuel Rocafuerte (ECU)	C	55.92	105	108	~~110~~	21	135	140	~~142~~	17	248
17	Tan Chi-chung (TPE)	C	55.79	~~110~~	110	~~113~~	18	135	~~138~~	~~138~~	19	245
18	İsmet Algül (TUR)	B	55.73	111	114	~~116~~	13	~~130~~	130	~~135~~	26	244
19	Jamjang Deru (IND)	C	55.75	~~102~~	102	~~105~~	27	133	138	142	13	244
20	Tom Goegebuer (BEL)	C	55.78	~~108~~	109	113	14	~~128~~	~~130~~	130	27	243
21	Gökhan Kılıç (TUR)	B	55.86	108	~~111~~	~~111~~	20	132	~~138~~	~~138~~	24	240
22	Manueli Tulo (FIJ)	C	55.93	103	107	~~110~~	23	127	133	~~138~~	23	240
23	Oleg Sîrghi (MDA)	C	55.91	100	105	—	25	~~132~~	~~133~~	133	22	238
24	Ösökhbayaryn Chagnaadorj (MGL)	C	55.36	100	~~105~~	105	24	130	~~136~~	~~136~~	25	235
25	Sukhen Dey (IND)	C	55.69	95	102	~~106~~	26	133	~~138~~	~~138~~	20	235
26	Francisco Barrera (CHI)	C	55.80	102	~~105~~	~~105~~	28	~~130~~	~~130~~	130	28	232
27	Michael Otero (ESP)	C	55.96	~~97~~	~~97~~	97	29	~~127~~	127	~~132~~	29	224
—	Arli Chontey (KAZ)	A	55.54	127	~~131~~	132	2nd place, silver medalist(s)	~~150~~	~~150~~	~~150~~	—	—
—	Amine Bouhijbha (TUN)	B	55.66	107	~~111~~	~~111~~	22	~~135~~	~~135~~	~~135~~	—	—
—	Luis García (DOM)	B	55.63	~~112~~	~~112~~	~~115~~	—	140	145	148	8	—
—	Ilie Ciotoiu (ROU)	B	55.87	~~104~~	~~104~~	~~104~~	—	133	~~136~~	~~136~~	21	—
—	Long Qingquan (CHN)	A	55.93	~~131~~	~~131~~	~~131~~	—	—	—	—	—	—
DQ	Mansour Al-Saleem (KSA)	B	55.53	119	~~123~~	123	—	138	141	144	—	267

== New records ==
Snatch	139 kg	Wu Jingbiao (CHN)	WR
Clean & Jerk	171 kg	Om Yun-chol (PRK)	WR
