= 2017 World Weightlifting Championships – Men's 56 kg =

The Men's 56 kg competition at the 2017 World Weightlifting Championships was held on 29 November 2017.

== Schedule ==
Date	Time	Event
29 November 2017	13:55	Group A

== Medalists ==
Event	Gold		Silver		Bronze	
Snatch	Thạch Kim Tuấn (VIE)	126 kg	Trần Lê Quốc Toàn (VIE)	119 kg	Josué Brachi (ESP)	118 kg
Clean & Jerk	Thạch Kim Tuấn (VIE)	153 kg	Trần Lê Quốc Toàn (VIE)	151 kg	Carlos Berna (COL)	149 kg
Total	Thạch Kim Tuấn (VIE)	279 kg	Trần Lê Quốc Toàn (VIE)	270 kg	Carlos Berna (COL)	266 kg

== Records ==
Prior to this competition, the existing world records were as follows.

World Record	Snatch	Wu Jingbiao (CHN)	139 kg	Houston, United States	21 November 2015
World Record	Clean & Jerk	Om Yun-chol (PRK)	171 kg	Houston, United States	21 November 2015
World Record	Total	Long Qingquan (CHN)	307 kg	Rio de Janeiro, Brazil	7 August 2016

== Results ==
Rank	Athlete	Group	Snatch (kg)				Clean & Jerk (kg)				Total
Rank	Athlete	Group	1	2	3	Rank	1	2	3	Rank	Total
1st place, gold medalist(s)	Thạch Kim Tuấn (VIE)	A	123	126	~~129~~	1st place, gold medalist(s)	150	153	~~158~~	1st place, gold medalist(s)	279
2nd place, silver medalist(s)	Trần Lê Quốc Toàn (VIE)	A	~~119~~	119	~~122~~	2nd place, silver medalist(s)	151	~~154~~	~~154~~	2nd place, silver medalist(s)	270
3rd place, bronze medalist(s)	Carlos Berna (COL)	A	113	~~116~~	117	4	~~144~~	144	149	3rd place, bronze medalist(s)	266
4	Josué Brachi (ESP)	A	116	118	~~120~~	3rd place, bronze medalist(s)	135	138	140	4	258
5	Seraj Al-Saleem (KSA)	A	108	~~112~~	112	5	138	~~143~~	~~143~~	5	250
6	Marcos Rojas (PER)	A	100	103	~~105~~	8	131	135	137	6	240
7	Manueli Tulo (FIJ)	A	103	~~107~~	~~107~~	9	130	135	~~138~~	7	238
8	Brian Reisenauer (USA)	A	~~105~~	~~105~~	105	7	127	~~132~~	~~132~~	8	232
—	Azroy Hazalwafie (MAS)	A	~~111~~	111	~~114~~	6	~~132~~	~~132~~	~~132~~	—	—
—	Habib de las Salas (COL)	A	~~110~~	~~110~~	~~110~~	—	~~143~~	—	—	—	—
—	Mirco Scarantino (ITA)	A	~~114~~	~~114~~	~~114~~	—	—	—	—	—	—
DQ	Witoon Mingmoon (THA)	A	115	~~118~~	~~119~~	—	147	152	~~155~~	—	—
