= 2022 World Weightlifting Championships – Men's 55 kg =

The men's 55 kilograms competition at the 2022 World Weightlifting Championships was held on 6 December 2022.

== Schedule ==
| Date | Time | Event |
|---|---|---|
| 6 December 2022 | 09:30 | Group B |
| 6 December 2022 | 19:00 | Group A |

== Medalists ==
| Event | Gold | | Silver | | Bronze | |
|---|---|---|---|---|---|---|
| Snatch | Lại Gia Thành (VIE) | 118 kg | Arli Chontey (KAZ) | 118 kg | Ngô Sơn Đỉnh (VIE) | 117 kg |
| Clean & Jerk | Theerapong Silachai (THA) | 148 kg | Kim Yong-ho (KOR) | 145 kg | Miguel Suárez (COL) | 143 kg |
| Total | Theerapong Silachai (THA) | 265 kg | Ngô Sơn Đỉnh (VIE) | 260 kg | Kim Yong-ho (KOR) | 260 kg |

== Records ==
Prior to this competition, the existing world records were as follows.

| World Record | Snatch | World Standard | 135 kg | — | 1 November 2018 |
| World Record | Clean & Jerk | Om Yun-chol (PRK) | 166 kg | Pattaya, Thailand | 18 September 2019 |
| World Record | Total | Om Yun-chol (PRK) | 294 kg | Pattaya, Thailand | 18 September 2019 |

== Results ==
| Rank | Athlete | Group | Snatch (kg) | | | | Clean & Jerk (kg) | | | | Total |
| Rank | Athlete | Group | 1 | 2 | 3 | Rank | 1 | 2 | 3 | Rank | Total |
|---|---|---|---|---|---|---|---|---|---|---|---|
| 1st place, gold medalist(s) | Theerapong Silachai (THA) | A | ~~117~~ | 117 | ~~119~~ | 4 | 144 | 147 | 148 | 1st place, gold medalist(s) | 265 |
| 2nd place, silver medalist(s) | Ngô Sơn Đỉnh (VIE) | A | ~~116~~ | 117 | ~~119~~ | 3rd place, bronze medalist(s) | 143 | ~~146~~ | ~~148~~ | 4 | 260 |
| 3rd place, bronze medalist(s) | Kim Yong-ho (KOR) | A | 115 | ~~118~~ | ~~119~~ | 5 | ~~145~~ | ~~145~~ | 145 | 2nd place, silver medalist(s) | 260 |
| 4 | Arli Chontey (KAZ) | A | 115 | ~~118~~ | 118 | 2nd place, silver medalist(s) | ~~140~~ | 141 | ~~144~~ | 6 | 259 |
| 5 | Miguel Suárez (COL) | B | 105 | ~~109~~ | ~~109~~ | 10 | 140 | 143 | ~~145~~ | 3rd place, bronze medalist(s) | 248 |
| 6 | Angel Rusev (BUL) | A | 106 | ~~110~~ | ~~110~~ | 9 | 141 | ~~145~~ | ~~145~~ | 5 | 247 |
| 7 | Nestor Colonia (PHI) | B | ~~110~~ | ~~110~~ | 110 | 7 | ~~133~~ | 133 | ~~140~~ | 8 | 243 |
| 8 | Josué Brachi (ESP) | B | 107 | 112 | ~~116~~ | 6 | 129 | ~~134~~ | ~~134~~ | 10 | 241 |
| 9 | José Poox (MEX) | B | 100 | 104 | ~~106~~ | 11 | 130 | 135 | ~~138~~ | 7 | 239 |
| 10 | Gabe Chhum (USA) | B | 100 | 103 | 106 | 8 | ~~132~~ | 132 | ~~135~~ | 9 | 238 |
| 11 | Jhony Arteaga (ECU) | B | 100 | 104 | ~~106~~ | 12 | 120 | 125 | ~~127~~ | 11 | 229 |
| 12 | Juan Barco (MEX) | B | 90 | ~~95~~ | ~~95~~ | 13 | 115 | 120 | ~~125~~ | 12 | 210 |
| — | Lại Gia Thành (VIE) | A | ~~118~~ | 118 | ~~121~~ | 1st place, gold medalist(s) | ~~141~~ | ~~142~~ | ~~142~~ | — | — |
| — | Mansour Al-Saleem (KSA) | A | ~~115~~ | ~~116~~ | ~~116~~ | — | ~~141~~ | ~~141~~ | ~~141~~ | — | — |
| — | Éric Andriantsitohaina (MAD) | A | ~~102~~ | ~~102~~ | ~~102~~ | — | — | — | — | — | — |
