= Weightlifting at the 2016 Summer Olympics – Men's 56 kg =

Men's 56 kg at the Games of the XXXI Olympiad
- Venue: Riocentro
- Date: 7 August 2016
- Competitors: 19 from 17 nations
- Winning total: 307 kg WR

Medalists
1st place, gold medalist(s)		Long Qingquan	China
2nd place, silver medalist(s)		Om Yun-chol	North Korea
3rd place, bronze medalist(s)		Sinphet Kruaithong	Thailand

The Men's 56 kg weightlifting competitions at the 2016 Summer Olympics in Rio de Janeiro took place on 7 August at the Pavilion 2 of Riocentro.

The medals were presented by Chang Ung, IOC member, North Korea and Salvatore Coffa, Vice President of International Weightlifting Federation.

== Schedule ==
All times are Time in Brazil (UTC-03:00)

Date	Time	Event
7 August 2016	10:00	Group B
7 August 2016	19:00	Group A

== Records ==
Prior to this competition, the existing world and Olympic records were as follows.

World record	Snatch	Wu Jingbiao (CHN)	139 kg	Houston, United States	21 November 2015
World record	Clean & Jerk	Om Yun-chol (PRK)	171 kg	Houston, United States	21 November 2015
World record	Total	Halil Mutlu (TUR)	305 kg	Sydney, Australia	16 September 2000
Olympic record	Snatch	Halil Mutlu (TUR)	138 kg	Sydney, Australia	16 September 2000
Olympic record	Clean & Jerk	Om Yun-chol (PRK)	168 kg	London, United Kingdom	29 July 2012
Olympic record	Total	Halil Mutlu (TUR)	305 kg	Sydney, Australia	16 September 2000

== Results ==
Rank	Athlete	Nation	Group	Body weight	Snatch (kg)				Clean & Jerk (kg)				Total
Rank	Athlete	Nation	Group	Body weight	1	2	3	Result	1	2	3	Result	Total
1st place, gold medalist(s)	Long Qingquan	China	A	55.68	132	~~135~~	137	137	161	166	170	170 OR	307 WR
2nd place, silver medalist(s)	Om Yun-chol	North Korea	A	55.57	128	132	134	134	165	~~169~~	169	169	303
3rd place, bronze medalist(s)	Sinphet Kruaithong	Thailand	A	55.43	125	131	132	132	154	157	~~161~~	157	289
4	Arli Chontey	Kazakhstan	A	55.64	125	130	~~132~~	130	148	~~153~~	~~154~~	148	278
5	Trần Lê Quốc Toàn	Vietnam	A	55.85	117	121	~~123~~	121	148	154	~~157~~	154	275
6	Habib de las Salas	Colombia	A	55.84	113	116	119	119	143	147	~~150~~	147	266
7	Mirco Scarantino	Italy	A	55.91	~~115~~	115	~~120~~	115	143	146	149	149	264
8	Luis García	Dominican Republic	B	55.56	110	115	118	118	140	~~145~~	145	145	263
9	Witoon Mingmoon	Thailand	A	55.67	~~113~~	113	~~116~~	113	148	~~151~~	~~151~~	148	261
10	Edgar Pineda	Guatemala	B	56.00	103	108	~~111~~	108	~~140~~	140	143	143	251
11	Hiroaki Takao	Japan	B	55.90	108	~~111~~	111	111	134	~~138~~	138	138	249
12	Tan Chi-chung	Chinese Taipei	B	55.89	~~110~~	~~110~~	110	110	131	135	138	138	248
13	Manueli Tulo	Fiji	B	55.81	103	106	~~109~~	106	130	136	~~139~~	136	242
14	Tom Goegebuer	Belgium	B	55.74	107	111	~~113~~	111	126	130	~~133~~	130	241
15	Elson Brechtefeld	Nauru	B	55.62	95	98	~~101~~	98	120	~~125~~	125	125	223
–	Thạch Kim Tuấn	Vietnam	A	55.55	~~130~~	130	~~133~~	130	~~157~~	~~160~~	~~160~~	–	–
–	Nestor Colonia	Philippines	A	55.11	120	~~125~~	~~125~~	120	~~154~~	~~154~~	~~154~~	–	–
–	Josué Brachi	Spain	B	55.67	~~120~~	~~120~~	~~120~~	–	–	–	–	–	–
DQ	Ösökhbayaryn Chagnaadorj	Mongolia	B	55.65	~~103~~	~~103~~	~~103~~	–	–	–	–	–	–

== New records ==
Clean & Jerk	169 kg	Om Yun-chol (PRK)	OR
Clean & Jerk	170 kg	Long Qingquan (CHN)	OR
Total	307 kg	Long Qingquan (CHN)	OR, WR
