= 2023 World Weightlifting Championships – Men's 55 kg =

The men's 55 kilograms competition at the 2023 World Weightlifting Championships was held on 4 and 5 September 2023.

== Schedule ==
Date	Time	Event
4 September 2023	16:30	Group B
5 September 2023	19:00	Group A

== Medalists ==
Event	Gold		Silver		Bronze	
Snatch	Lại Gia Thành (VIE)	123 kg	Ngô Sơn Đỉnh (VIE)	117 kg	Thada Somboon-uan (THA)	116 kg
Clean & Jerk	Lại Gia Thành (VIE)	146 kg	Ngô Sơn Đỉnh (VIE)	144 kg	Natthawat Chomchuen (THA)	143 kg
Total	Lại Gia Thành (VIE)	269 kg	Ngô Sơn Đỉnh (VIE)	261 kg	Natthawat Chomchuen (THA)	259 kg

== Records ==
Prior to this competition, the existing world records were as follows.

World Record	Snatch	World Standard	135 kg	—	1 November 2018
World Record	Clean & Jerk	Om Yun-chol (PRK)	166 kg	Pattaya, Thailand	18 September 2019
World Record	Total	Om Yun-chol (PRK)	294 kg	Pattaya, Thailand	18 September 2019

== Results ==
Rank	Athlete	Group	Snatch (kg)				Clean & Jerk (kg)				Total
Rank	Athlete	Group	1	2	3	Rank	1	2	3	Rank	Total
1st place, gold medalist(s)	Lại Gia Thành (VIE)	A	119	~~123~~	123	1st place, gold medalist(s)	142	~~145~~	146	1st place, gold medalist(s)	269
2nd place, silver medalist(s)	Ngô Sơn Đỉnh (VIE)	A	115	117	~~120~~	2nd place, silver medalist(s)	140	~~144~~	144	2nd place, silver medalist(s)	261
3rd place, bronze medalist(s)	Natthawat Chomchuen (THA)	A	113	~~116~~	116	5	143	~~146~~	~~147~~	3rd place, bronze medalist(s)	259
4	Mansour Al-Saleem (KSA)	A	~~114~~	116	~~118~~	4	~~140~~	143	~~147~~	4	259
5	Thada Somboon-uan (THA)	A	112	116	~~118~~	3rd place, bronze medalist(s)	130	136	~~142~~	5	252
6	Satrio Adi Nugroho (INA)	A	107	112	115	6	135	~~141~~	~~141~~	6	250
7	Ramini Shamilishvili (GEO)	A	~~112~~	~~112~~	112	7	131	~~137~~	~~137~~	11	253
8	Jean Ramiarimanana (MAD)	B	100	~~108~~	110	8	130	~~138~~	~~138~~	12	240
9	Miguel Suárez (COL)	A	102	106	~~108~~	11	133	~~140~~	~~141~~	9	239
10	Ali Ahmed Abd Ali Albacha Chee (IRQ)	B	104	107	~~110~~	9	~~130~~	130	~~135~~	13	237
11	Juan Barco (MEX)	B	98	101	103	14	130	134	~~137~~	7	237
12	Ösökhbayaryn Chagnaadorj (MGL)	B	~~103~~	103	~~109~~	13	128	133	~~137~~	8	236
13	Yernaz Alpyssov (KAZ)	B	102	106	~~109~~	10	~~127~~	127	~~132~~	15	233
14	José Poox (MEX)	B	~~100~~	100	~~103~~	16	128	132	~~134~~	10	232
15	Deniz Danev (BUL)	B	101	~~105~~	~~105~~	15	~~130~~	~~130~~	130	14	231
16	Marian Luca (ROU)	B	100	105	~~110~~	12	~~125~~	125	~~131~~	16	230
17	Amjad Ghanem (KSA)	B	93	~~98~~	98	17	115	122	~~127~~	17	220
—	Josué Brachi (ESP)	A	~~113~~	~~113~~	~~114~~	—	—	—	—	—	—
—	Anbar Basel (YEM)	B	Did not start								
