= 2013 World Weightlifting Championships – Men's 56 kg =

The men's competition in the –56 kg division was held on 21 October 2013 in Centennial Hall, Wrocław, Poland.

== Schedule ==
| Date | Time | Event |
|---|---|---|
| 21 October 2013 | 14:00 | Group B |
| 21 October 2013 | 19:55 | Group A |

== Medalists ==
| Event | Gold | | Silver | | Bronze | |
|---|---|---|---|---|---|---|
| Snatch | Long Qingquan (CHN) | 130 kg | Om Yun-chol (PRK) | 127 kg | Thạch Kim Tuấn (VIE) | 126 kg |
| Clean & Jerk | Om Yun-chol (PRK) | 162 kg | Long Qingquan (CHN) | 157 kg | Thạch Kim Tuấn (VIE) | 157 kg |
| Total | Om Yun-chol (PRK) | 289 kg | Long Qingquan (CHN) | 287 kg | Thạch Kim Tuấn (VIE) | 283 kg |

== Records ==
Prior to this competition, the existing world records were as follows.

| World Record | Snatch | Halil Mutlu (TUR) | 138 kg | Antalya, Turkey | 4 November 2001 |
| World Record | Clean & Jerk | Om Yun-chol (PRK) | 169 kg | Pyongyang, North Korea | 15 September 2013 |
| World Record | Total | Halil Mutlu (TUR) | 305 kg | Sydney, Australia | 16 September 2000 |

== Results ==
| Rank | Athlete | Group | Body weight | Snatch (kg) | | | | Clean & Jerk (kg) | | | | Total |
| Rank | Athlete | Group | Body weight | 1 | 2 | 3 | Rank | 1 | 2 | 3 | Rank | Total |
|---|---|---|---|---|---|---|---|---|---|---|---|---|
| 1st place, gold medalist(s) | Om Yun-chol (PRK) | A | 55.87 | 124 | 127 | ~~130~~ | 2nd place, silver medalist(s) | 162 | ~~170~~ | — | 1st place, gold medalist(s) | 289 |
| 2nd place, silver medalist(s) | Long Qingquan (CHN) | A | 55.44 | 126 | 130 | ~~132~~ | 1st place, gold medalist(s) | ~~157~~ | 157 | ~~163~~ | 2nd place, silver medalist(s) | 287 |
| 3rd place, bronze medalist(s) | Thạch Kim Tuấn (VIE) | A | 55.84 | 126 | ~~130~~ | ~~131~~ | 3rd place, bronze medalist(s) | 152 | 155 | 157 | 3rd place, bronze medalist(s) | 283 |
| 4 | Trần Lê Quốc Toàn (VIE) | A | 55.92 | ~~122~~ | 122 | 125 | 4 | 153 | ~~157~~ | ~~159~~ | 4 | 278 |
| 5 | Lázaro Ruiz (CUB) | A | 55.99 | 117 | 122 | ~~126~~ | 5 | 142 | 147 | 153 | 5 | 275 |
| 6 | Arli Chontey (KAZ) | A | 55.41 | 117 | ~~123~~ | ~~123~~ | 7 | 135 | 140 | ~~145~~ | 7 | 257 |
| 7 | Mirco Scarantino (ITA) | A | 55.57 | 107 | 111 | 113 | 9 | 135 | 141 | ~~145~~ | 6 | 254 |
| 8 | Asen Muradov (BUL) | A | 55.70 | ~~113~~ | 113 | ~~116~~ | 10 | 130 | ~~134~~ | 134 | 10 | 247 |
| 9 | Josué Brachi (ESP) | B | 55.38 | 109 | 113 | ~~115~~ | 8 | 133 | ~~136~~ | ~~136~~ | 11 | 246 |
| 10 | Enmanuel Rocafuerte (ECU) | B | 55.35 | 103 | 106 | ~~108~~ | 13 | 132 | 134 | 136 | 8 | 242 |
| 11 | Smbat Margaryan (ARM) | B | 55.53 | 100 | 104 | 107 | 11 | 132 | ~~140~~ | ~~140~~ | 13 | 239 |
| 12 | Teerasak Sriphat (THA) | B | 54.94 | 95 | 101 | 104 | 14 | 125 | 130 | 134 | 9 | 238 |
| 13 | Walter Zurita (ECU) | B | 55.62 | ~~103~~ | 103 | 107 | 12 | 127 | ~~132~~ | ~~133~~ | 14 | 234 |
| 14 | Witoon Mingmoon (THA) | B | 55.52 | 95 | 100 | ~~104~~ | 16 | 125 | 130 | 133 | 12 | 233 |
| 15 | Kota Yomogi (JPN) | B | 55.82 | 96 | 101 | ~~104~~ | 15 | ~~112~~ | 112 | — | 17 | 213 |
| 16 | Timur Khassarov (KAZ) | B | 55.54 | 90 | 96 | ~~101~~ | 17 | 110 | 116 | ~~120~~ | 15 | 212 |
| 17 | İsmet Algül (TUR) | B | 55.33 | 90 | 95 | ~~98~~ | 18 | 105 | 111 | 115 | 16 | 210 |
| — | Carlos Berna (COL) | A | 55.61 | 115 | 118 | 120 | 6 | ~~150~~ | ~~150~~ | ~~150~~ | — | — |
