= 2015 Asian Weightlifting Championships =

International weightlifting competition

2015 Asian Championships
- Host city: Phuket, Thailand
- Dates: 3–12 September
- Main venue: Theater Gymnasium Phuket

The 2015 Asian Weightlifting Championships was held in Phuket, Thailand from September 3–12, 2015. It was the 45th men's and 26th women's championship.

== Medal summary ==
=== Men ===
Event	Gold		Silver		Bronze	
56 kg
Snatch	Sinphet Kruaithong; Thailand	122 kg	Nestor Colonia; Philippines	121 kg	Trần Lê Quốc Toàn; Vietnam	120 kg
Clean & Jerk	Nestor Colonia; Philippines	153 kg	Trần Lê Quốc Toàn; Vietnam	152 kg	Sinphet Kruaithong; Thailand	146 kg
Total	Nestor Colonia; Philippines	274 kg	Trần Lê Quốc Toàn; Vietnam	272 kg	Sinphet Kruaithong; Thailand	268 kg
62 kg
Snatch	Ding Jianjun; China	143 kg	Majid Askari; Iran	130 kg	Sin Chol-bom; North Korea	128 kg
Clean & Jerk	Ding Jianjun; China	170 kg	Sin Chol-bom; North Korea	169 kg	Majid Askari; Iran	166 kg
Total	Ding Jianjun; China	313 kg	Sin Chol-bom; North Korea	297 kg	Majid Askari; Iran	296 kg
69 kg
Snatch	Kim Myong-hyok; North Korea	152 kg	Lin Qingfeng; China	150 kg	Kwon Chang-il; North Korea	148 kg
Clean & Jerk	Kim Myong-hyok; North Korea	186 kg	Huang Wenwen; China	183 kg	Izzat Artykov; Kyrgyzstan	181 kg
Total	Kim Myong-hyok; North Korea	338 kg	Lin Qingfeng; China	330 kg	Huang Wenwen; China	329 kg
77 kg
Snatch	Jon Myong-song; North Korea	160 kg	Chatuphum Chinnawong; Thailand	158 kg	Wang Jun; China	157 kg
Clean & Jerk	Aidar Kazov; Kazakhstan	194 kg	Chatuphum Chinnawong; Thailand	191 kg	Pornchai Lobsi; Thailand	190 kg
Total	Aidar Kazov; Kazakhstan	350 kg	Jon Myong-song; North Korea	350 kg	Chatuphum Chinnawong; Thailand	349 kg
85 kg
Snatch	Semen Linder; Kazakhstan	166 kg	Cao Gang; China	162 kg	Sun Wei; China	161 kg
Clean & Jerk	Yermek Omirtay; Kazakhstan	203 kg	Sun Wei; China	202 kg	Lim Young-chul; South Korea	198 kg
Total	Yermek Omirtay; Kazakhstan	364 kg	Sun Wei; China	363 kg	Lim Young-chul; South Korea	359 kg
94 kg
Snatch	Ali Hashemi; Iran	168 kg	Jung Hyeon-seop; South Korea	167 kg	Rustem Sybay; Kazakhstan	167 kg
Clean & Jerk	Rustem Sybay; Kazakhstan	216 kg	Jung Hyeon-seop; South Korea	209 kg	Tian Fuxuan; China	208 kg
Total	Rustem Sybay; Kazakhstan	383 kg	Jung Hyeon-seop; South Korea	376 kg	Ali Hashemi; Iran	376 kg
105 kg
Snatch	Seo Hui-yeop; South Korea	170 kg	Ahed Joughili; Syria	162 kg	Tinnaphop Kanrawangchai; Thailand	154 kg
Clean & Jerk	Seo Hui-yeop; South Korea	211 kg	Ahed Joughili; Syria	201 kg	Avez Idiev; Uzbekistan	193 kg
Total	Seo Hui-yeop; South Korea	381 kg	Ahed Joughili; Syria	363 kg	Taro Tanaka; Japan	346 kg
+105 kg
Snatch	Ivan Efremov; Uzbekistan	193 kg	Chen Shih-chieh; Chinese Taipei	193 kg	Bahador Molaei; Iran	178 kg
Clean & Jerk	Chen Shih-chieh; Chinese Taipei	245 kg	Bahador Molaei; Iran	236 kg	Ivan Efremov; Uzbekistan	220 kg
Total	Chen Shih-chieh; Chinese Taipei	438 kg	Bahador Molaei; Iran	414 kg	Ivan Efremov; Uzbekistan	413 kg

=== Women ===
Event	Gold		Silver		Bronze	
48 kg
Snatch	Vương Thị Huyền; Vietnam	86 kg	Huang Yuezhen; China	83 kg	Paek Il-hwa; North Korea	80 kg
Clean & Jerk	Panida Khamsri; Thailand	107 kg	Paek Il-hwa; North Korea	106 kg	Huang Yuezhen; China	105 kg
Total	Vương Thị Huyền; Vietnam	190 kg	Huang Yuezhen; China	188 kg	Panida Khamsri; Thailand	187 kg
53 kg
Snatch	Hidilyn Diaz; Philippines	96 kg	Kim Su-ryon; North Korea	95 kg	Kittima Sutanan; Thailand	87 kg
Clean & Jerk	Hidilyn Diaz; Philippines	118 kg	Yu Yuanyuan; China	115 kg	Kim Su-ryon; North Korea	113 kg
Total	Hidilyn Diaz; Philippines	214 kg	Kim Su-ryon; North Korea	208 kg	Nguyễn Thị Thúy; Vietnam	196 kg
58 kg
Snatch	Sukanya Srisurat; Thailand	104 kg	Li Ping; China	100 kg	Saule Saduakassova; Kazakhstan	96 kg
Clean & Jerk	Li Ping; China	126 kg	Assem Sadykova; Kazakhstan	122 kg	Sukanya Srisurat; Thailand	121 kg
Total	Li Ping; China	226 kg	Sukanya Srisurat; Thailand	225 kg	Assem Sadykova; Kazakhstan	217 kg
63 kg
Snatch	Zhou Wenyu; China	105 kg	Pimsiri Sirikaew; Thailand	103 kg	Park Min-young; South Korea	88 kg
Clean & Jerk	Zhou Wenyu; China	135 kg	Pimsiri Sirikaew; Thailand	130 kg	Park Min-young; South Korea	105 kg
Total	Zhou Wenyu; China	240 kg	Pimsiri Sirikaew; Thailand	233 kg	Park Min-young; South Korea	193 kg
69 kg
Snatch	Xie Hongli; China	107 kg	Paek Un-hye; North Korea	106 kg	Maira Faizullayeva; Kazakhstan	101 kg
Clean & Jerk	Xie Hongli; China	140 kg	Paek Un-hye; North Korea	135 kg	Maira Faizullayeva; Kazakhstan	125 kg
Total	Xie Hongli; China	247 kg	Paek Un-hye; North Korea	241 kg	Maira Faizullayeva; Kazakhstan	226 kg
75 kg
Snatch	Wang Zhouyu; China	115 kg	Yao Chi-ling; Chinese Taipei	101 kg	Ayumi Kamiya; Japan	100 kg
Clean & Jerk	Wang Zhouyu; China	135 kg	Yao Chi-ling; Chinese Taipei	126 kg	Omadoy Otakuziyeva; Uzbekistan	117 kg
Total	Wang Zhouyu; China	250 kg	Yao Chi-ling; Chinese Taipei	227 kg	Ayumi Kamiya; Japan	217 kg
+75 kg
Snatch	Chitchanok Pulsabsakul; Thailand	135 kg	Kim Kuk-hyang; North Korea	131 kg	Meng Suping; China	130 kg
Clean & Jerk	Meng Suping; China	180 kg	Kim Kuk-hyang; North Korea	165 kg	Son Young-hee; South Korea	162 kg
Total	Meng Suping; China	310 kg	Kim Kuk-hyang; North Korea	296 kg	Chitchanok Pulsabsakul; Thailand	295 kg

== Medal table ==
Ranking by Big (Total result) medals

Rank	Nation	Gold	Silver	Bronze	Total
1	China	6	3	1	10
2	Kazakhstan	3	0	2	5
3	Philippines	2	0	0	2
4	North Korea	1	5	0	6
5	South Korea	1	1	2	4
6	Vietnam	1	1	1	3
7	Chinese Taipei	1	1	0	2
8	Thailand	0	2	4	6
9	Iran	0	1	2	3
10	Syria	0	1	0	1
11	Japan	0	0	2	2
12	Uzbekistan	0	0	1	1
Totals (12 entries)		15	15	15	45

Ranking by all medals: Big (Total result) and Small (Snatch and Clean & Jerk)

Rank	Nation	Gold	Silver	Bronze	Total
1	China	16	10	6	32
2	Kazakhstan	7	1	6	14
3	Philippines	5	1	0	6
4	North Korea	4	12	4	20
5	Thailand	4	6	9	19
6	South Korea	3	3	6	12
7	Chinese Taipei	2	4	0	6
8	Vietnam	2	2	2	6
9	Iran	1	3	4	8
10	Uzbekistan	1	0	4	5
11	Syria	0	3	0	3
12	Japan	0	0	3	3
13	Kyrgyzstan	0	0	1	1
Totals (13 entries)		45	45	45	135

== Team ranking ==
=== Men ===
Rank	Team	Points
1	China	516
2	Thailand	510
3	Iran	499
4	Kazakhstan	417
5	North Korea	360
6	Chinese Taipei	282

=== Women ===
Rank	Team	Points
1	China	510
2	Thailand	489
3	North Korea	293
4	South Korea	279
5	Chinese Taipei	266
6	Turkmenistan	224

== Participating nations ==
162 athletes from 29 nations competed.

- Afghanistan (2)
- Bangladesh (6)
- Cambodia (1)
- China (15)
- Chinese Taipei (9)
- East Timor (1)
- India (4)
- Iran (8)
- Iraq (1)
- Japan (8)
- Jordan (5)
- Kazakhstan (10)
- Kyrgyzstan (4)
- Laos (1)
- Malaysia (5)
- Myanmar (2)
- Nepal (6)
- North Korea (9)
- Philippines (2)
- Qatar (1)
- South Korea (9)
- Sri Lanka (8)
- Syria (4)
- Tajikistan (2)
- Thailand (15)
- Turkmenistan (9)
- United Arab Emirates (4)
- Uzbekistan (6)
- Vietnam (5)
