= 2011 World Weightlifting Championships – Men's 56 kg =

The men's competition in the bantamweight (– 56 kg) division was held on 5 November 2011.

== Schedule ==
Date	Time	Event
5 November 2011	08:00	Group C
5 November 2011	14:00	Group B
5 November 2011	20:00	Group A

== Medalists ==
Event	Gold		Silver		Bronze	
Snatch	Wu Jingbiao (CHN)	133 kg	Zhao Chaojun (CHN)	128 kg	Trần Lê Quốc Toàn (VIE)	125 kg
Clean & Jerk	Wu Jingbiao (CHN)	159 kg	Zhao Chaojun (CHN)	156 kg	Valentin Hristov (AZE)	154 kg
Total	Wu Jingbiao (CHN)	292 kg	Zhao Chaojun (CHN)	284 kg	Valentin Hristov (AZE)	276 kg

== Records ==
Prior to this competition, the existing world records were as follows.

World Record	Snatch	Halil Mutlu (TUR)	138 kg	Antalya, Turkey	4 November 2001
World Record	Clean & Jerk	Halil Mutlu (TUR)	168 kg	Trenčín, Slovakia	24 April 2001
World Record	Total	Halil Mutlu (TUR)	305 kg	Sydney, Australia	16 September 2000

== Results ==
Rank	Athlete	Group	Body weight	Snatch (kg)				Clean & Jerk (kg)				Total
Rank	Athlete	Group	Body weight	1	2	3	Rank	1	2	3	Rank	Total
1st place, gold medalist(s)	Wu Jingbiao (CHN)	A	55.94	129	~~133~~	133	1st place, gold medalist(s)	156	159	~~161~~	1st place, gold medalist(s)	292
2nd place, silver medalist(s)	Zhao Chaojun (CHN)	A	55.89	~~125~~	125	128	2nd place, silver medalist(s)	156	~~159~~	~~159~~	2nd place, silver medalist(s)	284
3rd place, bronze medalist(s)	Valentin Hristov (AZE)	A	55.65	~~122~~	~~122~~	122	5	150	154	~~157~~	3rd place, bronze medalist(s)	276
4	Trần Lê Quốc Toàn (VIE)	A	55.37	121	124	125	3rd place, bronze medalist(s)	150	~~154~~	~~154~~	7	275
5	Sergio Álvarez (CUB)	A	55.99	115	118	~~120~~	7	145	150	154	4	272
6	Om Yun-chol (PRK)	A	55.76	115	~~118~~	~~118~~	10	~~152~~	~~152~~	152	5	267
7	Bekzat Osmonaliev (KGZ)	B	55.99	~~118~~	~~120~~	120	6	140	145	~~150~~	11	265
8	José Montes (MEX)	B	55.90	108	112	~~115~~	16	147	151	~~155~~	6	263
9	Yang Chin-yi (TPE)	A	55.54	~~115~~	115	~~120~~	8	146	~~151~~	~~151~~	8	261
10	Ruslan Makarov (UZB)	A	55.56	115	~~119~~	~~120~~	9	~~145~~	145	~~148~~	9	260
11	Sergio Rada (COL)	B	55.83	115	~~118~~	~~118~~	11	~~143~~	143	~~150~~	12	258
12	Pongsak Maneetong (THA)	B	55.89	107	~~112~~	112	15	137	142	145	10	257
13	Nestor Colonia (PHI)	B	55.93	113	~~117~~	~~117~~	13	~~143~~	~~143~~	143	13	256
14	Tom Goegebuer (BEL)	B	55.88	112	~~115~~	115	12	134	139	~~141~~	19	254
15	Tanasak Pan-em (THA)	B	55.52	~~107~~	107	112	14	135	141	~~143~~	17	253
16	Carlos Berna (COL)	B	55.49	109	~~112~~	~~112~~	20	~~142~~	142	~~147~~	14	251
17	Oleg Sîrghi (MDA)	B	55.92	105	108	~~110~~	22	136	142	~~147~~	16	250
18	Julio Salamanca (ESA)	C	55.99	105	108	110	19	135	140	~~143~~	18	250
19	Masaharu Yamada (JPN)	C	55.64	98	~~100~~	100	29	137	139	142	15	242
20	Javier Guirado (ESP)	C	55.91	105	109	~~113~~	21	125	130	133	21	242
21	Manueli Tulo (FIJ)	C	55.72	~~101~~	101	105	24	129	134	~~137~~	20	239
22	Josué Brachi (ESP)	C	55.95	103	~~107~~	107	23	125	130	~~133~~	24	237
23	Omarguly Handurdyýew (TKM)	C	55.95	~~100~~	100	105	25	125	~~131~~	131	22	236
24	Yohei Shimizu (JPN)	C	55.96	103	~~106~~	~~106~~	27	~~128~~	128	~~132~~	26	231
25	Marvin López (ESA)	C	55.66	100	~~105~~	~~105~~	30	130	~~135~~	~~135~~	23	230
26	Tan Chi-chung (TPE)	C	55.93	~~102~~	~~102~~	102	28	~~128~~	128	~~133~~	25	230
27	Darren Barnes (USA)	C	55.25	95	100	103	26	120	~~125~~	~~125~~	28	223
28	Sylvain Andrieux (FRA)	C	55.46	96	99	~~101~~	31	119	124	~~126~~	27	223
—	Thạch Kim Tuấn (VIE)	A	55.55	~~125~~	125	~~129~~	4	~~149~~	~~151~~	~~151~~	—	—
—	Carlos Hernández (CUB)	B	55.82	110	~~115~~	~~115~~	17	~~142~~	—	—	—	—
—	Sumariyanto (INA)	B	55.83	110	~~115~~	~~115~~	18	~~140~~	~~140~~	~~140~~	—	—
DQ	Khalil El-Maaoui (TUN)	A	55.81	~~127~~	127	~~128~~	—	~~145~~	~~145~~	~~145~~	—	—
