= Weightlifting at the 2014 Asian Games – Men's 56 kg =

Men's 56 kg at the 2014 Asian Games
- Venue: Moonlight Festival Garden Venue
- Date: 20 September 2014
- Competitors: 14 from 13 nations

Medalists
gold medal	Om Yun-chol	North Korea
silver medal	Thạch Kim Tuấn	Vietnam
bronze medal	Wu Jingbiao	China

The men's 56 kilograms event at the 2014 Asian Games took place on 20 September 2014 at Moonlight Festival Garden Weightlifting Venue.

== Schedule ==
All times are Korea Standard Time (UTC+09:00)

Date	Time	Event
Saturday, 20 September 2014	14:00	Group B
Saturday, 20 September 2014	19:00	Group A

== Records ==
Prior to this competition, the existing world, Asian and Games records were as follows.

World Record	Snatch	Halil Mutlu (TUR)	138 kg	Antalya, Turkey	4 November 2001
World Record	Clean & Jerk	Om Yun-chol (PRK)	169 kg	Pyongyang, North Korea	13 September 2013
World Record	Total	Halil Mutlu (TUR)	305 kg	Sydney, Australia	16 September 2000
Asian Record	Snatch	Wu Jingbiao (CHN)	133 kg	Guangzhou, China	13 November 2010
Asian Record	Clean & Jerk	Om Yun-chol (PRK)	169 kg	Pyongyang, North Korea	13 September 2013
Asian Record	Total	Lan Shizhang (CHN)	295 kg	Szekszárd, Hungary	9 May 1998
Games Record	Snatch	Wu Jingbiao (CHN)	133 kg	Guangzhou, China	13 November 2010
Games Record	Clean & Jerk	Wu Meijin (CHN)	162 kg	Busan, South Korea	1 October 2002
Games Record	Total	Wu Meijin (CHN)	292 kg	Busan, South Korea	1 October 2002

== Results ==
Legend

- NM — No mark

Rank	Athlete	Group	Body weight	Snatch (kg)				Clean & Jerk (kg)				Total
Rank	Athlete	Group	Body weight	1	2	3	Result	1	2	3	Result	Total
1st place, gold medalist(s)	Om Yun-chol (PRK)	A	55.69	123	128	~~131~~	128	160	166	170	170	298
2nd place, silver medalist(s)	Thạch Kim Tuấn (VIE)	A	55.87	~~130~~	130	134	134	156	160	~~162~~	160	294
3rd place, bronze medalist(s)	Wu Jingbiao (CHN)	A	55.77	130	~~133~~	133	133	155	~~160~~	~~161~~	155	288
4	Trần Lê Quốc Toàn (VIE)	A	55.91	~~123~~	124	127	127	153	156	~~162~~	156	283
5	Yang Chin-yi (TPE)	A	55.76	122	~~125~~	~~125~~	122	150	155	~~161~~	155	277
6	Majid Askari (IRI)	A	55.75	118	~~123~~	124	124	~~146~~	~~146~~	146	146	270
7	Arli Chontey (KAZ)	A	55.89	122	~~127~~	~~127~~	122	145	~~150~~	~~150~~	145	267
8	Surahmat Wijoyo (INA)	B	55.84	109	114	~~117~~	114	141	149	~~151~~	149	263
9	Mansour Al-Saleem (KSA)	B	55.37	117	120	123	123	131	136	139	139	262
10	Go Suk-kyo (KOR)	B	55.89	105	112	~~117~~	112	135	140	~~143~~	140	252
11	Zulhelmi Pisol (MAS)	B	55.75	~~105~~	105	108	108	135	138	140	140	248
12	Sukhen Dey (IND)	B	55.89	103	106	~~108~~	106	~~133~~	133	136	136	242
—	Muhammad Shahzad (PAK)	B	55.99	106	109	111	111	~~132~~	~~132~~	~~132~~	—	NM
—	Nestor Colonia (PHI)	A	55.66	~~120~~	~~120~~	~~120~~	—	—	—	—	—	NM

== New records ==
The following records were established during the competition.

Snatch	134	Thạch Kim Tuấn (VIE)	AR
Clean & Jerk	166	Om Yun-chol (PRK)	GR
Clean & Jerk	170	Om Yun-chol (PRK)	WR
Total	294	Thạch Kim Tuấn (VIE)	GR
Total	298	Om Yun-chol (PRK)	AR
