= 2021 World Weightlifting Championships – Men's 55 kg =

World Weightlifting Championship

The men's 55 kilograms competition at the 2021 World Weightlifting Championships was held on 7 December 2021.

== Schedule ==
Date	Time	Event
7 December 2021	14:00	Group B
7 December 2021	19:00	Group A

== Medalists ==
Event	Gold		Silver		Bronze	
Snatch	Mansour Al-Saleem (KSA)	118 kg	Arli Chontey (KAZ)	118 kg	Muammer Şahin (TUR)	116 kg
Clean & Jerk	Angel Rusev (BUL)	144 kg	Aniq Kasdan (MAS)	142 kg	Arli Chontey (KAZ)	142 kg
Total	Arli Chontey (KAZ)	260 kg	Thada Somboon-uan (THA)	256 kg	Angel Rusev (BUL)	254 kg

== Records ==
Prior to this competition, the existing world records were as follows.

World Record	Snatch	World Standard	135 kg	—	1 November 2018
World Record	Clean & Jerk	Om Yun-chol (PRK)	166 kg	Pattaya, Thailand	18 September 2019
World Record	Total	Om Yun-chol (PRK)	294 kg	Pattaya, Thailand	18 September 2019

== Results ==
Rank	Athlete	Group	Snatch (kg)				Clean & Jerk (kg)				Total
Rank	Athlete	Group	1	2	3	Rank	1	2	3	Rank	Total
1st place, gold medalist(s)	Arli Chontey (KAZ)	A	113	116	118	2nd place, silver medalist(s)	137	140	142	3rd place, bronze medalist(s)	260
2nd place, silver medalist(s)	Thada Somboon-uan (THA)	A	112	115	~~117~~	4	~~135~~	137	141	4	256
3rd place, bronze medalist(s)	Angel Rusev (BUL)	A	106	110	~~112~~	7	140	144	~~147~~	1st place, gold medalist(s)	254
4	Josué Brachi (ESP)	A	110	114	~~117~~	5	135	139	~~141~~	5	253
5	Aniq Kasdan (MAS)	A	103	107	~~112~~	11	135	~~140~~	142	2nd place, silver medalist(s)	249
6	Muammer Şahin (TUR)	A	110	113	116	3rd place, bronze medalist(s)	123	127	~~130~~	12	243
7	Miguel Suárez (COL)	B	~~104~~	~~104~~	104	14	133	138	~~142~~	6	242
8	Fernando Agad (PHI)	B	104	~~107~~	108	10	131	~~136~~	~~136~~	8	239
9	Satrio Adi Nugroho (INA)	B	~~100~~	103	108	9	~~130~~	130	~~136~~	10	238
10	Daniel Lungu (MDA)	B	109	~~114~~	~~114~~	8	127	~~130~~	~~130~~	11	236
11	Dmytro Voronovskyi (UKR)	A	105	~~108~~	~~108~~	13	128	131	~~135~~	9	236
12	Winder Sánchez (VEN)	B	103	~~106~~	~~106~~	15	~~132~~	~~132~~	132	7	235
13	Davis Niyoyita (UGA)	B	90	95	~~100~~	16	120	~~125~~	125	13	220
14	Benjamin Ochoma (KEN)	B	55	~~60~~	~~60~~	17	75	80	~~85~~	14	135
—	Mansour Al-Saleem (KSA)	A	115	118	~~120~~	1st place, gold medalist(s)	~~136~~	~~138~~	~~138~~	—	—
—	Sanket Sargar (IND)	A	107	111	113	6	~~139~~	~~139~~	~~140~~	—	—
—	Dilanka Isuru Kumara (SRI)	B	105	~~110~~	~~110~~	12	~~135~~	~~135~~	~~135~~	—	—
