= Weightlifting at the 2013 SEA Games – Men's 56 kg =

The men's 56 kg event at the 2013 SEA Games took place on 13 December 2013 at Thein Phyu Stadium.

== Schedule ==
All times are Myanmar Standard Time (UTC+06:30)

Date	Time	Event
Friday, 13 December 2013	12:00	Final

== Results ==
Rank	Athlete	Group	Body weight	Snatch (kg)				Clean & Jerk (kg)				Total
Rank	Athlete	Group	Body weight	1	2	3	Result	1	2	3	Result	Total
1st place, gold medalist(s)	Thach Kim Tuan (VIE)	A	55.90	123	129	~~133~~	129	146	156	—	156	285
2nd place, silver medalist(s)	Jadi Setiadi (INA)	A	55.10	115	119	121	121	135	140	~~142~~	140	276
3rd place, bronze medalist(s)	Pyae Phyo (MYA)	A	55.60	111	~~116~~	~~118~~	111	135	~~151~~	~~151~~	135	246
4	Muhamad Aznil Bidin (MAS)	A	56.00	104	~~110~~	~~110~~	104	127	133	~~137~~	133	237

== New records ==
The following records were established during the competition.

Snatch	129	Thach Kim Tuan (VIE)	GR
Total	285	Thach Kim Tuan (VIE)	GR
