= 2018 World Weightlifting Championships – Men's 55 kg =

The men's 55 kilograms competition at the 2018 World Weightlifting Championships was held on 1–2 November 2018.

== Schedule ==
Date	Time	Event
1 November 2018	14:30	Group B
2 November 2018	19:55	Group A

== Medalists ==
Event	Gold		Silver		Bronze	
Snatch	Om Yun-chol (PRK)	120 kg	Arli Chontey (KAZ)	120 kg	Josué Brachi (ESP)	115 kg
Clean & Jerk	Om Yun-chol (PRK)	162 kg	Lại Gia Thành (VIE)	142 kg	Angel Rusev (BUL)	140 kg
Total	Om Yun-chol (PRK)	282 kg	Arli Chontey (KAZ)	258 kg	Mirco Scarantino (ITA)	252 kg

== Records ==
Prior to this competition, the existing world records were as follows.

World Record	Snatch	World Standard	135 kg	—	1 November 2018
World Record	Clean & Jerk	World Standard	161 kg	—	1 November 2018
World Record	Total	World Standard	293 kg	—	1 November 2018

== Results ==
Rank	Athlete	Group	Snatch (kg)				Clean & Jerk (kg)				Total
Rank	Athlete	Group	1	2	3	Rank	1	2	3	Rank	Total
1st place, gold medalist(s)	Om Yun-chol (PRK)	A	120	~~125~~	~~128~~	1st place, gold medalist(s)	155	~~162~~	162 WR	1st place, gold medalist(s)	282
2nd place, silver medalist(s)	Arli Chontey (KAZ)	A	115	118	120	2nd place, silver medalist(s)	135	~~138~~	138	5	258
3rd place, bronze medalist(s)	Mirco Scarantino (ITA)	A	110	113	~~116~~	5	136	138	139	4	252
4	Kim Young-ho (KOR)	A	114	~~118~~	~~118~~	4	~~136~~	~~137~~	137	6	251
5	Josué Brachi (ESP)	A	115	~~118~~	~~118~~	3rd place, bronze medalist(s)	135	~~138~~	~~139~~	7	250
6	Angel Rusev (BUL)	A	103	108	—	7	130	135	140	3rd place, bronze medalist(s)	248
7	Sergio Massidda (ITA)	B	~~105~~	105	~~110~~	8	~~126~~	126	131	8	236
8	Muammer Şahin (TUR)	B	110	~~114~~	~~114~~	6	120	125	~~128~~	9	235
9	Thada Somboon-uan (THA)	B	~~101~~	~~101~~	101	10	120	123	~~126~~	10	224
10	Leonardo Guzmán (MEX)	B	100	103	~~106~~	9	120	~~124~~	~~125~~	11	223
—	Lại Gia Thành (VIE)	A	~~116~~	~~116~~	~~116~~	—	139	142	~~147~~	2nd place, silver medalist(s)	—
—	Kwak Un-bom (PRK)	A	~~113~~	~~113~~	~~113~~	—	—	—	—	—	—
DQ	Teerapat Chomchuen (THA)	A	~~105~~	~~105~~	~~105~~	—	133	136	141	—	—

== New records ==
Clean & Jerk	162 kg	Om Yun-chol (PRK)	WR
