= Angel Rusev (weightlifter) =

Bulgarian weightlifter (born 2001)

Personal information
- Native name: Ангел Хрисков Русев
- Full name: Angel Hriskov Rusev
- Nationality: Bulgarian
- Born: 13 July 2001 (age 25)
- Weight: 54.98 kg (121 lb)

Sport
- Country: Bulgaria
- Sport: Weightlifting
- Weight class: –55 kg
- Club: TSK "Ruse"
- Coached by: Radoslav Atanasov, Ivan Ivanov
Medal record
Representing Bulgaria
World Championships
Bronze medal – third place	2021 Tashkent	–55 kg
European Championships
Gold medal – first place	2021 Moscow	–55 kg
Gold medal – first place	2022 Tirana	–55 kg
Gold medal – first place	2023 Yerevan	–55 kg
Gold medal – first place	2024 Sofia	–55 kg
Gold medal – first place	2025 Chișinău	–55 kg
Gold medal – first place	2026 Batumi	–60 kg
Silver medal – second place	2019 Batumi	–55 kg
European Junior & U23 Weightlifting Championships
Gold medal – first place	2019 Bucharest	–55 kg
European Youth Championships
Gold medal – first place	2018 San Donato Milanese	–56 kg
Bronze medal – third place	2017 Pristina	–56 kg

Angel Hriskov Rusev (Bulgarian: Ангел Хрисков Русев; born 13 July 2001) is a Bulgarian weightlifter. He is a graduate of the Sports school in Ruse and competes for the local weightlifting club TSK "Ruse".

== Career ==
=== World Championships ===
He competed at the 2018 World Weightlifting Championships in the newly created 55 kg category. At the competition he set the youth world records in the snatch, clean & jerk and total for the 55 kg weight class, winning also the bronze medal in the clean & jerk.

In 2021 he competed at the 2021 World Weightlifting Championships in the 55 kg category, winning the gold medal in the clean & jerk portion and a bronze medal in the total.

The following years he managed sixth in the total in Bogotá and Manama.

=== European Championships ===
He competed at the 2019 European Weightlifting Championships in the 55 kg category, winning the gold medal in the clean & jerk portion and a silver medal in the total.

In 2021, he competed at the European Weightlifting Championships in the 55 kg category, winning the bronze in the snatch and the gold medal in the clean & jerk portion and in the total with new European Junior record.

Since 2021 he has been unbeaten on European level winning European championships five times overall.

== Major results ==
Year	Venue	Weight	Snatch (kg)				Clean & Jerk (kg)				Total	Rank
Year	Venue	Weight	1	2	3	Rank	1	2	3	Rank	Total	Rank
World Championships
2018	Ashgabat, Turkmenistan	55 kg	103	108	—	7	130	135	140	3rd place, bronze medalist(s)	248	6
2021	Tashkent, Uzbekistan	55 kg	106	110	~~112~~	7	140	144	~~147~~	1st place, gold medalist(s)	254	3rd place, bronze medalist(s)
2022	Bogotá, Colombia	55 kg	106	~~110~~	~~110~~	9	141	~~145~~	~~145~~	5	247	6
2024	Manama, Bahrain	55 kg	~~110~~	110	~~113~~	7	135	141	144	5	254	6
2025	Førde, Norway	60 kg	118	~~121~~	~~121~~	13	~~150~~	~~150~~	~~152~~	—	—	—
2026	Ningbo, China	60 kg	~~115~~	~~115~~	~~115~~	—	—	—	—	—	—	—
European Championships
2018	Bucharest, Romania	56 kg	100	103	105	6	~~125~~	125	128	5	233	5
2019	(Georgia (country)) Batumi, Georgia	55 kg	105	110	~~112~~	4	~~136~~	138	146 EJR	1st place, gold medalist(s)	256 EJR	2nd place, silver medalist(s)
2021	Moscow, Russia	55 kg	~~105~~	105	111	3rd place, bronze medalist(s)	140	~~147~~	147 EJR	1st place, gold medalist(s)	258 EJR	1st place, gold medalist(s)
2022	Tirana, Albania	55 kg	108	111	113	3rd place, bronze medalist(s)	140	144	~~148~~	1st place, gold medalist(s)	257	1st place, gold medalist(s)
2023	Yerevan, Armenia	55 kg	105	~~108~~	109	4	135	141	—	1st place, gold medalist(s)	250	1st place, gold medalist(s)
2024	Sofia, Bulgaria	55 kg	105	109	~~111~~	3rd place, bronze medalist(s)	135	~~140~~	—	1st place, gold medalist(s)	244	1st place, gold medalist(s)
2025	Chișinău, Moldova	55 kg	105	~~110~~	~~111~~	8	141	~~150~~	—	1st place, gold medalist(s)	246	1st place, gold medalist(s)
2026	(Georgia (country)) Batumi, Georgia	60 kg	117	~~120~~	120	6	~~155~~	~~155~~	155	1st place, gold medalist(s)	275	1st place, gold medalist(s)
European Junior & U23 Weightlifting Championships
2019	Bucharest, Romania	55 kg	100	105	107	3rd place, bronze medalist(s)	132	136	~~147~~	1st place, gold medalist(s)	243	1st place, gold medalist(s)
2021	Rovaniemi, Finland	61 kg	~~105~~	105	—	6	145	~~150~~	153	2nd place, silver medalist(s)	258	5
2022	Tirana, Albania	61 kg	~~107~~	~~108~~	~~108~~	—	139	146	~~151~~	1st place, gold medalist(s)	—	—
World Youth Weightlifting Championships
2017	Bangkok, Thailand	56 kg	90	95	~~98~~	12	120	~~125~~	~~125~~	10	215	12
European Youth Weightlifting Championships
2017	Pristina, Kosovo	56 kg	95	~~100~~	~~100~~	6	120	126	~~128~~	2nd place, silver medalist(s)	221	3rd place, bronze medalist(s)
2018	San Donato Milanese, Italy	56 kg	95	100	102	2nd place, silver medalist(s)	130	133	138	1st place, gold medalist(s)	240	1st place, gold medalist(s)
International Fajr Cup
2020	Rasht, Iran	61 kg	105	110	~~113~~	2nd place, silver medalist(s)	135	143	147	2nd place, silver medalist(s)	257	2nd place, silver medalist(s)
