= Mirco Scarantino =

Italian weightlifter (born 1995)

Personal information
- Nationality: Italian
- Born: 16 January 1995 (age 31) San Cataldo, Italy
- Height: 1.66 m (5 ft 5 in)
- Weight: 54.90 kg (121 lb)

Sport
- Country: Italy
- Sport: Weightlifting
- Event: –55 kg
- Club: Fiamme Oro
Medal record
Representing Italy
World Championships
Bronze medal – third place	2018 Ashgabat	–55 kg
European Championships
Gold medal – first place	2016 Førde	–56 kg
Gold medal – first place	2017 Split	–56 kg
Gold medal – first place	2019 Batumi	–55 kg
Silver medal – second place	2014 Tel Aviv	–56 kg
Silver medal – second place	2018 Bucharest	–56 kg
Bronze medal – third place	2015 Tbilisi	–56 kg

Mirco Scarantino (born 16 January 1995) is an Italian weightlifter, two time Olympian and three time European Champion competing in the 56 kg category until 2018 and 55 kg starting in 2018 after the International Weightlifting Federation reorganized the categories.

== Career ==
=== Olympics ===
He competed at the 2012 Summer Olympics in the Men's 56 kg, finishing 14th and at the 2016 Summer Olympics in the Men's 56 kg, finishing 7th.

=== World Championships ===
After competing at the World Weightlifting Championships since 2013, he won his first medal at the 2018 World Weightlifting Championships. Competing in the newly created 55 kg category, after the IWF restructured the weight classes, he won the bronze medal with a total of 252 kilograms (556 lb).

== Major results ==
Year	Venue	Weight	Snatch (kg)				Clean & Jerk (kg)				Total	Rank
Year	Venue	Weight	1	2	3	Rank	1	2	3	Rank	Total	Rank
Olympic Games
2012	London, United Kingdom	56 kg	~~97~~	~~97~~	97	17	123	128	~~132~~	12	225	14
2016	Rio de Janeiro, Brazil	56 kg	~~115~~	115	~~120~~	9	143	146	149	5	264	7
World Championships
2013	Wrocław, Poland	56 kg	107	111	113	9	135	141	~~145~~	6	254	7
2014	Almaty, Kazakhstan	56 kg	113	~~116~~	~~116~~	16	~~143~~	~~144~~	~~144~~	—	—	—
2015	Houston, United States	56 kg	~~115~~	~~115~~	115	11	142	~~147~~	~~147~~	14	257	12
2017	Anaheim, United States	56 kg	~~114~~	~~114~~	~~114~~	—	—	—	—	—	—	—
2018	Ashgabat, Turkmenistan	55 kg	110	113	~~116~~	5	136	138	139	5	252	3rd place, bronze medalist(s)
European Championships
2012	Antalya, Turkey	56 kg	93	98	102	8	120	126	~~131~~	9	228	9
2013	Tirana, Albania	56 kg	105	~~108~~	~~108~~	6	132	136	~~138~~	3rd place, bronze medalist(s)	241	5
2014	Tel Aviv, Israel	56 kg	110	114	~~116~~	5	140	~~143~~	143	3rd place, bronze medalist(s)	257	2nd place, silver medalist(s)
2015	(Georgia (country)) Tbilisi, Georgia	56 kg	112	115	118	2nd place, silver medalist(s)	~~140~~	141	~~145~~	3rd place, bronze medalist(s)	259	3rd place, bronze medalist(s)
2016	Førde, Norway	56 kg	115	117	120	2nd place, silver medalist(s)	141	144	~~150~~	1st place, gold medalist(s)	264	1st place, gold medalist(s)
2017	Split, Croatia	56 kg	114	117	120	1st place, gold medalist(s)	140	146	–	1st place, gold medalist(s)	266	1st place, gold medalist(s)
2018	Bucharest, Romania	56 kg	111	~~115~~	115	2nd place, silver medalist(s)	138	~~141~~	~~141~~	2nd place, silver medalist(s)	253	2nd place, silver medalist(s)
2019	(Georgia (country)) Batumi, Georgia	55 kg	110	112	116	1st place, gold medalist(s)	136	140	145	2nd place, silver medalist(s)	261	1st place, gold medalist(s)
