= Arli Chontey =

Kazakhstani weightlifter (born 1992)

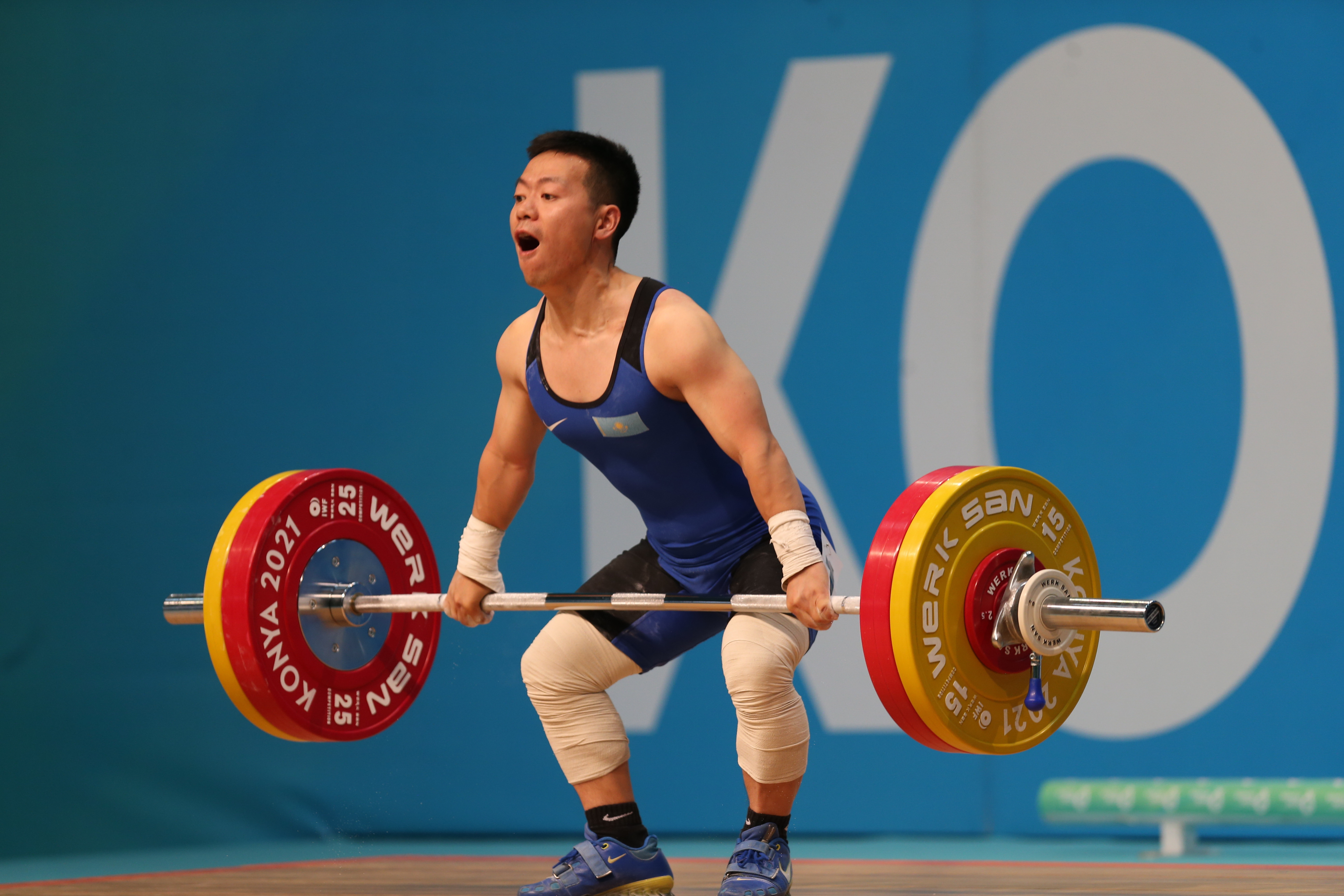
- Arli Chotney at the 2021 Islamic Solidarity Games

Personal information
- Native name: Арли Чонтей
- Nationality: Kazakhstani
- Born: 1 July 1992 (age 34) Kyrgyzstan
- Education: Kazakh Academy of Sport and Tourism
- Height: 1.50 m (4 ft 11 in)
- Weight: 54.81 kg (121 lb)

Sport
- Country: Kazakhstan
- Sport: Olympic Weightlifting
- Event: –55 kg
- Coached by: Nurlan Aitmurzayev
Medal record
Representing Kazakhstan
Men's weightlifting
World Championships
Gold medal – first place	2021 Tashkent	55 kg
Silver medal – second place	2018 Ashgabat	55 kg
Asian Championships
Gold medal – first place	2020 Tashkent	55 kg
Silver medal – second place	2022 Manama	55 kg
Bronze medal – third place	2019 Ningbo	55 kg
Disqualified	2023 Jinju	55 kg
Islamic Solidarity Games
Gold medal – first place	2021 Konya	55 kg
Summer Universiade
Bronze medal – third place	2017 Taipei	56 kg

Arli Chontey (born 1 July 1992) is a Kazakhstani male weightlifter who competes in the -55 kg division. He won the gold medal in the men's 55 kg event at the 2021 World Weightlifting Championships held in Tashkent, Uzbekistan.

Chontey was born in Kyrgyzstan and moved to China at a young age. Not given a chance to get into China's national weightlifting team, he moved back to Kyrgyzstan in 2008. In 2011, Chontey began training with the Kazakh national team in 2011. In 2012, he became a citizen of Kazakhstan.

== Competition ==
He finished sixth overall at the 2013 and 2014 World Championships, and placed second in the snatch in 2015, but failed all attempts in the clean and jerk. He qualified for the 2016 Summer Olympics.

He won the silver medal in the men's 55 kg event at the 2022 Asian Weightlifting Championships held in Manama, Bahrain.

He won the silver medal in the men's 55 kg Snatch event at the 2022 World Weightlifting Championships held in Bogotá, Colombia.

== Major results ==
Year	Venue	Weight	Snatch (kg)				Clean & Jerk (kg)				Total	Rank
Year	Venue	Weight	1	2	3	Rank	1	2	3	Rank	Total	Rank
Representing Kazakhstan
Olympic Games
2016	Rio de Janeiro, Brazil	56 kg	125	130	~~132~~	5	148	~~153~~	~~154~~	6	278	4
World Championships
2013	Wrocław, Poland	56 kg	117	~~123~~	~~123~~	7	135	140	~~145~~	7	257	6
2014	Almaty, Kazakhstan	56 kg	122	126	129	4	145	~~150~~	~~150~~	11	274	6
2015	Houston, United States	56 kg	127	~~131~~	132	2nd place, silver medalist(s)	~~150~~	~~150~~	~~150~~	—	—	—
2018	Ashgabat, Turkmenistan	55 kg	115	118	120	2nd place, silver medalist(s)	135	~~138~~	138	5	258	2nd place, silver medalist(s)
2019	Pattaya, Thailand	55 kg	115	118	~~120~~	5	138	143	145	6	263	5
2021	Tashkent, Uzbekistan	55 kg	113	116	118	2nd place, silver medalist(s)	137	140	142	3rd place, bronze medalist(s)	260	1st place, gold medalist(s)
2022	Bogotá, Colombia	55 kg	115	~~118~~	118	2nd place, silver medalist(s)	~~140~~	141	~~144~~	6	259	4
Asian Games
2014	Incheon, South Korea	56 kg	122	~~127~~	~~127~~	8	145	~~150~~	~~150~~	8	267	7
Asian Championships
2013	Astana, Kazakhstan	56 kg	~~110~~	110	115	6	~~135~~	~~135~~	~~135~~	—	—	—
2019	Ningbo, China	55 kg	107	111	113	2nd place, silver medalist(s)	~~128~~	128	133	4	246	3rd place, bronze medalist(s)
2020	Tashkent, Uzbekistan	55 kg	110	113	115	1st place, gold medalist(s)	136	140	~~142~~	1st place, gold medalist(s)	255	1st place, gold medalist(s)
2022	Manama, Bahrain	55 kg	113	116	~~118~~	3rd place, bronze medalist(s)	137	140	144	1st place, gold medalist(s)	260	2nd place, silver medalist(s)
2023												
Summer Universiade
2013	Kazan, Russia	56 kg	107	112	115	1	130	~~135~~	~~135~~	8	245	4
2017	Taipei, Taiwan	56 kg	115	~~120~~	~~120~~	3	135	140	143	3	258	3rd place, bronze medalist(s)
