= Yasmani Romero =

Cuban weightlifter (born 1988)

Yasmani Romero (born 26 September 1988, Las Tunas) is a Cuban weightlifter. He competed at the 2012 Summer Olympics in the Men's 56 kg, finishing 11th with a total of 258 kg.
