= Weightlifting at the Summer World University Games =

- Events: 15 (men: 8; women: 7)

Games
- 1959; 1960; 1961; 1962; 1963; 1964; 1965; 1966; 1967; 1968; 1970; 1970; 1973; 1972; 1975; 1975; 1977; 1978; 1979; 1981; 1983; 1985; 1987; 1989; 1991; 1993; 1995; 1997; 1999; 2001; 2003; 2005; 2007; 2009; 2011; 2013; 2015; 2017; 2019; 2021; 2025

Weightlifting events have been contested at Universiade three times as an optional sport, in 2011, 2013, and 2017.

== Editions ==
Games	Year	Host city	Host country
XXVI	2011	Shenzhen	China
XXVII	2013	Kazan	Russia
XXIX	2017	New Taipei	Taiwan

== Events ==
Medals were awarded in sixteen different weight classes: eight for men and eight for women.

Event	Men	Women
1	–56 kg	–48 kg
2	62 kg	53 kg
3	69 kg	58 kg
4	77 kg	63 kg
5	85 kg	69 kg
6	94 kg	75 kg
7	105 kg	90 kg
8	+105 kg	+90 kg

== Current records ==
=== Men ===
Event	Record	Athlete	Nation	Date	Meet	Place	Note
56 kg
Snatch	129 kg	Om Yun-chol	North Korea	20 August 2017	2017 Summer Universiade	New Taipei, Taiwan	
Clean & jerk	165 kg	Om Yun-chol	North Korea	20 August 2017	2017 Summer Universiade	New Taipei, Taiwan	
Total	294 kg	Om Yun-chol	North Korea	20 August 2017	2017 Summer Universiade	New Taipei, Taiwan	
62 kg
Snatch	140 kg	Eko Yuli Irawan	Indonesia	14 August 2011	2011 Summer Universiade	Shenzhen, China	
Clean & jerk	171 kg	Sin Chol-bom	North Korea	20 August 2017	2017 Summer Universiade	New Taipei, Taiwan	
Total	310 kg	Eko Yuli Irawan	Indonesia	14 August 2011	2011 Summer Universiade	Shenzhen, China	
69 kg
Snatch	153 kg	Kim Myong-hyok	North Korea	21 August 2017	2017 Summer Universiade	New Taipei, Taiwan	
Clean & jerk	185 kg	Albert Linder	Kazakhstan	21 August 2017	2017 Summer Universiade	New Taipei, Taiwan	
Total	333 kg	Albert Linder	Kazakhstan	21 August 2017	2017 Summer Universiade	New Taipei, Taiwan	
77 kg
Snatch	163 kg	Dmitry Khomyakov	Russia	10 July 2013	2013 Summer Universiade	Kazan, Russia	
Clean & jerk	198 kg	Rasoul Taghian	Iran	10 July 2013	2013 Summer Universiade	Kazan, Russia	
Total	355 kg	Rasoul Taghian	Iran	10 July 2013	2013 Summer Universiade	Kazan, Russia	
85 kg
Snatch	170 kg	Andranik Karapetyan	Armenia	23 September 2017	2017 Summer Universiade	New Taipei, Taiwan	
Clean & jerk	205 kg	Apti Aukhadov	Russia	11 July 2013	2013 Summer Universiade	Kazan, Russia	
Total	372 kg	Apti Aukhadov	Russia	11 July 2013	2013 Summer Universiade	Kazan, Russia	
94 kg
Snatch	181 kg	Alexandr Ivanov	Russia	12 July 2013	2013 Summer Universiade	Kazan, Russia	
Clean & jerk	215 kg	Egor Klimonov	Russia	24 August 2017	2017 Summer Universiade	New Taipei, Taiwan	
Total	395 kg	Alexandr Ivanov	Russia	12 July 2013	2013 Summer Universiade	Kazan, Russia	
105 kg
Snatch	190 kg	Ruslan Nurudinov	Uzbekistan	12 July 2013	2013 Summer Universiade	Kazan, Russia	
Clean & jerk	224 kg	David Bedzhanyan	Russia	12 July 2013	2013 Summer Universiade	Kazan, Russia	
Total	412 kg	Ruslan Nurudinov	Uzbekistan	12 July 2013	2013 Summer Universiade	Kazan, Russia	
+105 kg
Snatch	205 kg	Ruslan Albegov	Russia	12 July 2013	2013 Summer Universiade	Kazan, Russia	
Clean & jerk	254 kg	Bahador Moulaei	Iran	12 July 2013	2013 Summer Universiade	Kazan, Russia	
Total	459 kg	Ruslan Albegov	Russia	12 July 2013	2013 Summer Universiade	Kazan, Russia	

=== Women ===
Event	Record	Athlete	Nation	Date	Meet	Place	Note
48 kg
Snatch	87 kg	Xiao Hongyu	China	7 July 2013	2013 Summer Universiade	Kazan, Russia	
Clean & jerk	108 kg	Xiao Hongyu	China	13 August 2011	2011 Summer Universiade	Shenzhen, China	
Total	193 kg	Ri Song-gum	North Korea	20 August 2017	2017 Summer Universiade	New Taipei, Taiwan	
53 kg
Snatch	100 kg	Ji Jing	China	14 August 2011	2011 Summer Universiade	Shenzhen, China	
Clean & jerk	122 kg	Ji Jing	China	14 August 2011	2011 Summer Universiade	Shenzhen, China	
Total	222 kg	Ji Jing	China	14 August 2011	2011 Summer Universiade	Shenzhen, China	
58 kg
Snatch	107 kg	Kuo Hsing-chun	Chinese Taipei	21 August 2017	2017 Summer Universiade	New Taipei, Taiwan	
Clean & jerk	142 kg	Kuo Hsing-chun	Chinese Taipei	21 August 2017	2017 Summer Universiade	New Taipei, Taiwan	WR
Total	249 kg	Kuo Hsing-chun	Chinese Taipei	21 August 2017	2017 Summer Universiade	New Taipei, Taiwan	
63 kg
Snatch	117 kg	Rim Un-sim	North Korea	22 August 2017	2017 Summer Universiade	New Taipei, Taiwan	
Clean & jerk	133 kg	Pyon Yong-mi	North Korea	9 July 2013	2013 Summer Universiade	Kazan, Russia	
Total	236 kg	Rim Un-sim	North Korea	22 August 2017	2017 Summer Universiade	New Taipei, Taiwan	
69 kg
Snatch	110 kg	Kang Yue	China	17 August 2011	2011 Summer Universiade	Shenzhen, China	
Clean & jerk	135 kg	Oksana Slivenko	Russia	10 July 2013	2013 Summer Universiade	Kazan, Russia	
Total	242 kg	Oksana Slivenko	Russia	10 July 2013	2013 Summer Universiade	Kazan, Russia	
75 kg
Snatch	123 kg	Nadezhda Evstyukhina	Russia	11 July 2013	2013 Summer Universiade	Kazan, Russia	
Clean & jerk	159 kg	Olga Zubova	Russia	11 July 2013	2013 Summer Universiade	Kazan, Russia	
Total	279 kg	Olga Zubova	Russia	11 July 2013	2013 Summer Universiade	Kazan, Russia	
90 kg
Snatch	111 kg	Iryna Dekha	Ukraine	25 August 2017	2017 Summer Universiade	New Taipei, Taiwan	
Clean & jerk	135 kg	Iryna Dekha	Ukraine	25 August 2017	2017 Summer Universiade	New Taipei, Taiwan	
Total	246 kg	Iryna Dekha	Ukraine	25 August 2017	2017 Summer Universiade	New Taipei, Taiwan	
+90 kg
Snatch	142 kg^{1}	Tatiana Kashirina	Russia	11 July 2013	2013 Summer Universiade	Kazan, Russia	
Clean & jerk	177 kg^{1}	Tatiana Kashirina	Russia	11 July 2013	2013 Summer Universiade	Kazan, Russia	
Total	319 kg^{1}	Tatiana Kashirina	Russia	11 July 2013	2013 Summer Universiade	Kazan, Russia	

^1: The records were set on the 2013 edition's women's +75 kg events.

== Medal table ==
Last updated after the 2017 Summer Universiade

Rank	Nation	Gold	Silver	Bronze	Total
1	Russia (RUS)	10	8	5	23
2	North Korea (PRK)	10	5	3	18
3	China (CHN)	6	5	1	12
4	Chinese Taipei (TPE)	4	3	5	12
5	Kazakhstan (KAZ)	3	4	1	8
6	Armenia (ARM)	3	1	1	5
7	Thailand (THA)	2	3	7	12
8	Indonesia (INA)	2	2	1	5
9	Iran (IRN)	2	1	1	4
10	Ukraine (UKR)	1	2	1	4
11	Japan (JPN)	1	1	1	3
11	Uzbekistan (UZB)	1	1	1	3
13	Hungary (HUN)	1	0	0	1
14	South Korea (KOR)	0	3	5	8
15	Dominican Republic (DOM)	0	2	0	2
16	Lithuania (LTU)	0	1	1	2
16	Mexico (MEX)	0	1	1	2
18	Belarus (BLR)	0	1	0	1
18	France (FRA)	0	1	0	1
18	United States (USA)	0	1	0	1
21	Canada (CAN)	0	0	3	3
21	Turkey (TUR)	0	0	3	3
23	Egypt (EGY)	0	0	2	2
24	Great Britain (GBR)	0	0	1	1
24	Moldova (MDA)	0	0	1	1
24	Romania (ROU)	0	0	1	1
Totals (26 entries)		46	46	46	138
