= Miguel Suárez (weightlifter) =

Colombian weightlifter (born 1999)

Personal information
- Full name: Miguel Angel Suárez Mesa
- Born: 14 September 1999 (age 26)

Sport
- Country: Colombia
- Sport: Weightlifting
- Weight class: 55 kg
Medal record
Representing Colombia
Men's weightlifting
Pan American Championships
Gold medal – first place	2020 Santo Domingo	55 kg
Gold medal – first place	2021 Guayaquil	55 kg
Gold medal – first place	2022 Bogotá	55 kg
Central American and Caribbean Games
Gold medal – first place	2023 San Salvador	55 kg S
Gold medal – first place	2023 San Salvador	55 kg CJ
Bolivarian Games
Gold medal – first place	2022 Valledupar	55 kg S
Gold medal – first place	2022 Valledupar	55 kg CJ

Miguel Angel Suárez Mesa (born 14 September 1999) is a Colombian weightlifter. He is a three-time gold medalist in the men's 55 kg event at the Pan American Weightlifting Championships. He also won two gold medals at the 2022 Bolivarian Games held in Valledupar, Colombia.

== Career ==
Suárez won the gold medal in the men's 55 kg event at the 2020 Pan American Weightlifting Championships held in Santo Domingo, Dominican Republic.

In 2021, he won the gold medal in his event at the Pan American Weightlifting Championships held in Guayaquil, Ecuador. In that same year, he competed in the men's 55 kg event at the World Weightlifting Championships held in Tashkent, Uzbekistan.

In 2022, Suárez won the gold medal in the men's 55 kg event at the Pan American Weightlifting Championships held in Bogotá, Colombia. He also won the gold medals in the Snatch and Clean & Jerk events. He set a new Panamerican record of 142 kg in the Clean & Jerk.

He won the bronze medal in the men's 55 kg Clean & Jerk event at the 2022 World Weightlifting Championships held in Bogotá, Colombia.

== Achievements ==
Year	Venue	Weight	Snatch (kg)				Clean & Jerk (kg)				Total	Rank
Year	Venue	Weight	1	2	3	Rank	1	2	3	Rank	Total	Rank
Representing Colombia
World Championships
2021	Tashkent, Uzbekistan	55 kg	~~104~~	~~104~~	104	14	133	138	~~142~~	6	242	7
2022	Bogotá, Colombia	55 kg	105	~~109~~	~~109~~	10	140	143	~~145~~	3rd place, bronze medalist(s)	248	5
2023	Riyadh, Saudi Arabia	55 kg	102	106	~~108~~	11	133	~~140~~	~~141~~	9	239	9
Pan American Championships
2020	Santo Domingo, Dominican Republic	55 kg	100	~~103~~	105	2nd place, silver medalist(s)	130	133	137	1st place, gold medalist(s)	242	1st place, gold medalist(s)
2021	Guayaquil, Ecuador	55 kg	103	105	107	1st place, gold medalist(s)	132	135	137	1st place, gold medalist(s)	244	1st place, gold medalist(s)
2022	Bogotá, Colombia	55 kg	100	103	105	1st place, gold medalist(s)	133	138	142	1st place, gold medalist(s)	247	1st place, gold medalist(s)
Central American and Caribbean Games
2023	San Salvador, El Salvador	55 kg	100	104	106	1st place, gold medalist(s)	132	136	138	1st place, gold medalist(s)	—N/a	—N/a
Bolivarian Games
2022	Valledupar, Colombia	55 kg	100	105	~~108~~	1st place, gold medalist(s)	129	135	140	1st place, gold medalist(s)	—N/a	—N/a
Youth World Championships
2016	Penang, Malaysia	50 kg	83	86	~~90~~	6	110	115	~~118~~	4	201	6
