= Mansour Al-Saleem =

Saudi Arabian weightlifter (born 1988)

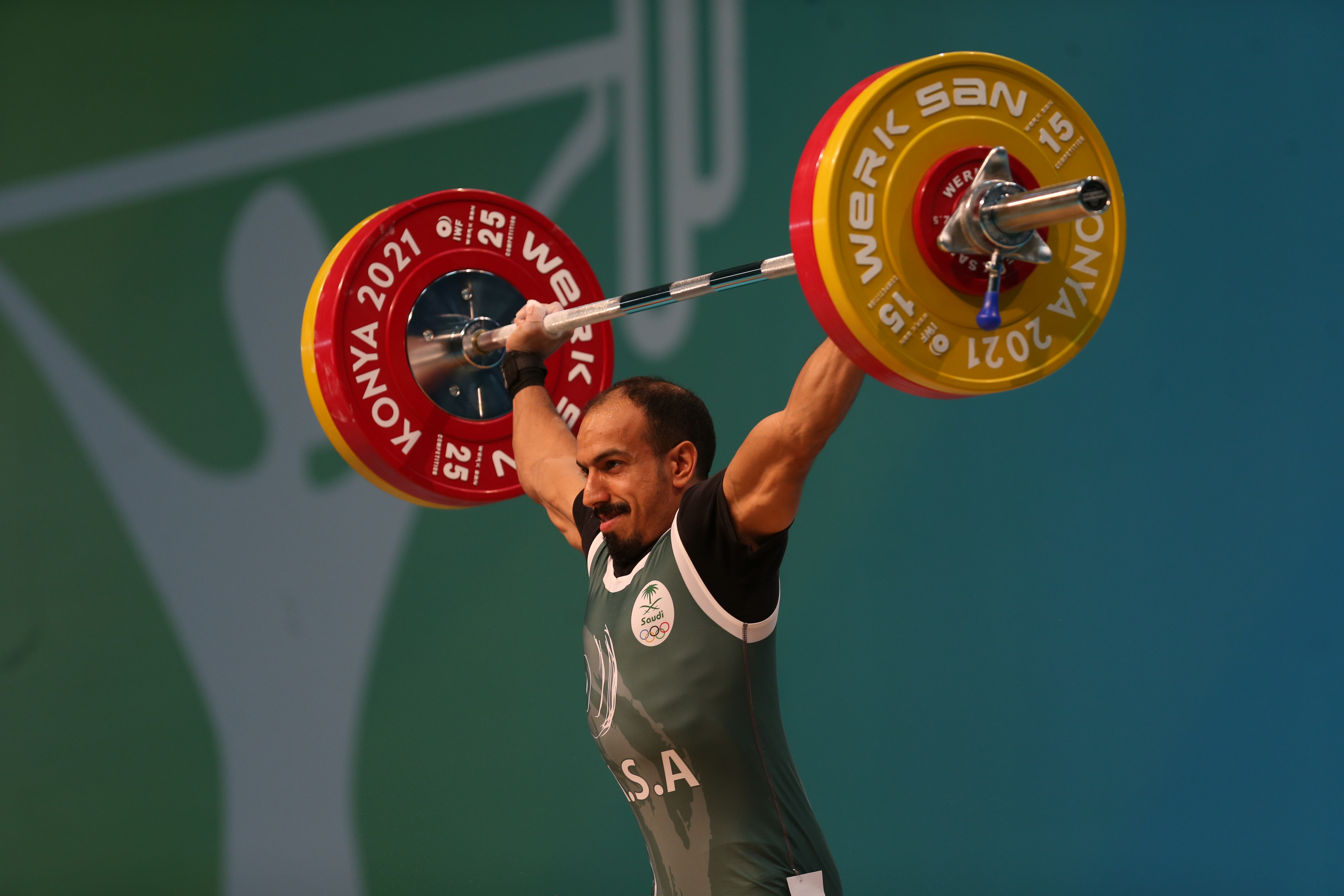

Personal information
- Full name: Mansour Abdulrahim Al-Saleem
- Nationality: Saudi Arabian
- Born: 16 March 1988 (age 38)
- Weight: 55.00 kg (121 lb)

Sport
- Country: Saudi Arabia
- Sport: Weightlifting
- Event: –55 kg
Medal record
Men's weightlifting
Representing Saudi Arabia
World Championships
Bronze medal – third place	2019 Pattaya	55 kg
Asian Championships
Gold medal – first place	2019 Ningbo	55 kg
Bronze medal – third place	2022 Manama	55 kg
Bronze medal – third place	2025 Jiangshan	55 kg
Islamic Solidarity Games
Silver medal – second place	2021 Konya	55 kg
Pan Arab Games
Silver medal – second place	2011 Doha	56 kg

Mansour Abdulrahim Al-Saleem (Arabic: منصور آل سليم; born 16 March 1988) is a Saudi Arabian weightlifter.

He won a bronze medal at the 2019 World Weightlifting Championships.

He won another bronze medal in the men's 55 kg event at the 2022 Asian Weightlifting Championships held in Manama, Bahrain.

== Achievements ==
Year	Venue	Weight	Snatch (kg)				Clean & Jerk (kg)				Total	Rank
Year	Venue	Weight	1	2	3	Rank	1	2	3	Rank	Total	Rank
World Championships
2014	Almaty, Kazakhstan	56 kg	116	120	124	7	135	~~140~~	142	15	266	9
2015	Houston, United States	56 kg	119	~~123~~	123	~~6~~	138	141	144	~~12~~	267	DSQ
2019	Pattaya, Thailand	55 kg	~~118~~	118	~~121~~	6	140	~~147~~	147	3rd place, bronze medalist(s)	265	3rd place, bronze medalist(s)
2021	Tashkent, Uzbekistan	55 kg	115	118	~~120~~	1st place, gold medalist(s)	~~136~~	~~138~~	~~138~~	—	—	—
2022	Bogotá, Colombia	55 kg	~~115~~	~~116~~	~~116~~	—	~~141~~	~~141~~	~~141~~	—	—	—
2023	Riyadh, Saudi Arabia	55 kg	~~114~~	116	~~118~~	4	~~140~~	143	~~147~~	4	259	4
2024	Manama, Bahrain	55 kg	114	~~119~~	119	4	139	143	~~146~~	6	262	4
2025	Førde, Norway	60 kg	118	122	~~125~~	10	~~144~~	~~145~~	145	13	267	12
Asian Games
2014	Incheon, South Korea	56 kg	117	120	123	123	131	136	139	139	262	9
2018	Jakarta, Indonesia	56 kg	117	122	~~125~~	122	142	~~150~~	~~150~~	142	264	6
