= Tan Chi-chung =

Taiwanese weightlifter

Personal information
- Full name: Tan Chi-chung
- Born: 24 February 1990 (age 36) Taipei, Taiwan
- Height: 1.55 m (5 ft 1 in)
- Weight: 55.79 kg (123 lb)

Sport
- Country: Chinese Taipei
- Sport: Weightlifting
Medal record
Men's weightlifting
Representing Chinese Taipei
Summer Universiade
Bronze medal – third place	2011 Shenzhen	55 kg
- Updated on 8 April 2017

Tan Chi-chung (Chinese: 唐啟中; pinyin: Táng Qǐzhōng; born February 24, 1990) is a Taiwanese male weightlifter, competing in the 56 kg category and representing Chinese Taipei at international competitions. He participated in the men's 56 kg event at the 2015 World Championships, and at the 2016 Summer Olympics. He won the bronze medal at the 2011 Summer Universiade.

== Major results ==
Year	Venue	Weight	Snatch (kg)				Clean & Jerk (kg)				Total	Rank
Year	Venue	Weight	1	2	3	Rank	1	2	3	Rank	Total	Rank
World Championships
2015	Houston, United States	56 kg	~~110~~	110	~~113~~	19	135	~~138~~	~~138~~	20	245	18
2014	Almaty, Kazakhstan	56 kg	106	~~111~~	~~111~~	25	140	145	~~148~~	12	251	16
2011	Paris, France	56 kg	~~102~~	~~102~~	102	28	~~128~~	128	~~133~~	25	230	26
Summer Universiade
2011	Shenzhen, China	56 kg	100	103	105	2nd place, silver medalist(s)	128	131	~~134~~	3rd place, bronze medalist(s)	236	3rd place, bronze medalist(s)
