= Thada Somboon-uan =

Thai weightlifter (born 2000)

Personal information
- Born: 3 November 2000 (age 25)

Sport
- Country: Thailand
- Sport: Weightlifting
- Weight class: 55 kg
Medal record
Men's weightlifting
Representing Thailand
World Championships
Silver medal – second place	2021 Tashkent	–55 kg
Southeast Asian Games
Silver medal – second place	2021 Hanoi	–55 kg
Silver medal – second place	2023 Phnom Penh	–55 kg

Thada Somboon-uan (Thai: ธาดา สมบูรณ์อ้วน, born 3 November 2000) is a Thai weightlifter. He won the silver medal in the men's 55 kg event at the 2021 World Weightlifting Championships held in Tashkent, Uzbekistan.

He also competed in the men's 55 kg event at the 2018 World Weightlifting Championships held in Ashgabat, Turkmenistan.

== Achievements ==
Year	Venue	Weight	Snatch (kg)				Clean & Jerk (kg)				Total	Rank
Year	Venue	Weight	1	2	3	Rank	1	2	3	Rank	Total	Rank
World Championships
2018	Ashgabat, Turkmenistan	55 kg	~~101~~	~~101~~	101	10	120	123	~~126~~	10	224	9
2021	Tashkent, Uzbekistan	55 kg	112	115	~~117~~	4	~~135~~	137	141	4	256	2nd place, silver medalist(s)
