= Thạch Kim Tuấn =

Vietnamese weightlifter (born 1994)

Personal information
- Born: 15 January 1994 (age 32) Hàm Tân, Bình Thuận, Vietnam
- Height: 1.60 m (5 ft 3 in)
- Weight: 56 kg (123 lb)

Achievements and titles
- Personal bests: Snatch: 135 kg (2014,JWR,AR); Clean and jerk: 161 kg (2014); Total: 296 kg (2014,JWR)
Medal record
Men's weightlifting
Representing Vietnam
World Championships
Gold medal – first place	2017 Anaheim	–56 kg
Silver medal – second place	2014 Almaty	–56 kg
Bronze medal – third place	2013 Wrocław	–56 kg
Bronze medal – third place	2015 Houston	–56 kg
Asian Games
Silver medal – second place	2014 Incheon	–56 kg
Silver medal – second place	2018 Jakarta	–56 kg
Asian Championships
Silver medal – second place	2013 Astana	–56 kg
Southeast Asian Games
Gold medal – first place	2013 Naypyidaw	–56 kg
Gold medal – first place	2017 Kuala Lumpur	–56 kg
Bronze medal – third place	2011 Palembang	–56 kg
Junior World Championships
Gold medal – first place	2014 Kazan	–56 kg
Bronze medal – third place	2011 Penang	–56 kg
Youth Olympic Games
Gold medal – first place	2010 Singapore	–56 kg
Youth World Championships
Silver medal – second place	2009 Chiang Mai	–50 kg
Junior Asian Championships
Gold medal – first place	2012 Yangoon	–56 kg
Youth Asian Championships
Gold medal – first place	2011 Pattaya	–56 kg

Thạch Kim Tuấn (born 15 January 1994) is a Vietnamese weightlifter of Khmer descent. He won a silver and two bronze medals at the 2011 World Junior Weightlifting Championships in Malaysia. Dubbed the "young hope" by the Vietnam Athletes Association for Weightlifting at the 2012 Summer Olympics – Men's 56 kg but did not qualify. However, he did win a silver medal at the following year's Asian Championships.

== Major results ==
Year	Venue	Weight	Snatch (kg)				Clean & Jerk (kg)				Total	Rank
Year	Venue	Weight	1	2	3	Rank	1	2	3	Rank	Total	Rank
Olympic Games
2016	Rio de Janeiro, Brazil	56 kg	~~130~~	130	~~133~~	4	~~157~~	~~160~~	~~160~~	--	--	--
2020	Tokyo, Japan	61 kg	~~126~~	126	~~130~~	8	~~150~~	~~150~~	~~153~~	--	--	--
World Championships
2011	Paris, France	56 kg	~~125~~	125	~~129~~	4	~~149~~	~~151~~	~~151~~	--	--	--
2013	Wrocław, Poland	56 kg	126	~~130~~	~~131~~	3rd place, bronze medalist(s)	152	155	157	3rd place, bronze medalist(s)	283	3rd place, bronze medalist(s)
2014	Almaty, Kazakhstan	56 kg	130	134	135	1st place, gold medalist(s)	~~156~~	156	161	2nd place, silver medalist(s)	296	2nd place, silver medalist(s)
2015	Houston, United States	56 kg	~~130~~	130	~~133~~	4	151	153	157	4	287	3rd place, bronze medalist(s)
2017	Anaheim, United States	56 kg	123	126	~~129~~	1st place, gold medalist(s)	150	153	158	1st place, gold medalist(s)	279	1st place, gold medalist(s)
2018	Ashgabat, Turkmenistan	61 kg	135	~~139~~	~~139~~	5	~~163~~	163	~~167~~	6	298	5
2019	Pattaya, Thailand	61 kg	133	~~136~~	~~136~~	5	163	~~167~~	~~167~~	6	296	4
Asian Games
2014	Incheon, South Korea	56 kg	~~130~~	130	134	1	156	160	~~162~~	1	294	2nd place, silver medalist(s)
2018	Jakarta, Indonesia	56 kg	~~128~~	128	~~132~~	1	152	~~160~~	~~161~~	3	280	2nd place, silver medalist(s)
Asian Championships
2012	Pyeongtaek, South Korea	56 kg	122	124	~~126~~	3rd place, bronze medalist(s)	145	~~150~~	~~150~~	6	269	4
2013	Astana, Kazakhstan	56 kg	~~125~~	125	~~127~~	2nd place, silver medalist(s)	153	156	~~161~~	2nd place, silver medalist(s)	281	2nd place, silver medalist(s)
2019	Ningbo, China	61 kg	132	~~135~~	136	2nd place, silver medalist(s)	161	~~165~~	~~166~~	6	297	5
2020	Tashkent, Uzbekistan	61 kg	125	128	~~131~~	6	~~151~~	~~152~~	~~152~~	--	--	--
