= Jadi Setiadi =

Indonesian weightlifter (born 1985)

Personal information
- Born: 2 February 1985 (age 41) Pringsewu, Lampung, Indonesia
Medal record
Men's Weightlifting
Asian Games
Bronze medal – third place	2010 Guangzhou	– 56 kg
Asian Championships
Bronze medal – third place	2012 Pyeongtaek	– 56 kg
SEA Games
Gold medal – first place	2001 Kuala Lumpur	– 56 kg
Gold medal – first place	2009 Vientiane	– 56 kg
Silver medal – second place	2011 Jakarta-Palembang	– 56 kg
Silver medal – second place	2013 Naypyidaw	– 56 kg

Jadi Setiadi (born 2 February 1985, in Pringsewu, Lampung) is an Indonesian weightlifter. He competed at the 2012 Summer Olympics in the Men's 56 kg, finishing 5th. He had previously competed in the same weight division at the 2004 Summer Olympics, finishing in 8th.
