= Weightlifting at the 2012 Summer Olympics – Men's 56 kg =

Men's 56 kg at the Games of the XXX Olympiad
- Venue: ExCeL London
- Date: 29 July 2012
- Competitors: 18 from 15 nations

Medalists
1st place, gold medalist(s)		Om Yun-chol	North Korea
2nd place, silver medalist(s)		Wu Jingbiao	China
3rd place, bronze medalist(s)		Trần Lê Quốc Toàn	Vietnam

The Men's 56 kilograms weightlifting event at the 2012 Summer Olympics was held in ExCeL London on 29 July.

== Summary ==
Total score was the sum of the lifter's best result in each of the snatch and the clean and jerk, with three lifts allowed for each lift. In case of a tie, the lighter lifter won; if still tied, the lifter who took the fewest attempts to achieve the total score won. Lifters without a valid snatch score did not perform the clean and jerk.

On 22 December 2018, it was announced that Azerbaijan's Valentin Hristov, London 2012 Olympic bronze medalist, had tested positive for performance-enhancing drugs. In March 2019, Hristov was disqualified after the re-analysis of his samples were positive for oralturinabol. Medals were reallocated.

== Schedule ==
All times are British Summer Time (UTC+01:00)

Date	Time	Event
29 July 2012	10:00	Group B
29 July 2012	19:00	Group A

== Records ==
Prior to this competition, the existing world and Olympic records were as follows.

World Record	Snatch	Halil Mutlu (TUR)	138 kg	Antalya, Turkey	4 November 2001
World Record	Clean & Jerk	Halil Mutlu (TUR)	168 kg	Trenčín, Slovakia	24 April 2001
World Record	Total	Halil Mutlu (TUR)	305 kg	Sydney, Australia	16 September 2000
Olympic Record	Snatch	Halil Mutlu (TUR)	138 kg	Sydney, Australia	16 September 2000
Olympic Record	Clean & Jerk	Halil Mutlu (TUR)	167 kg	Sydney, Australia	16 September 2000
Olympic Record	Total	Halil Mutlu (TUR)	305 kg	Sydney, Australia	16 September 2000

== Results ==
Rank	Athlete	Group	Body weight	Snatch (kg)				Clean & Jerk (kg)				Total
Rank	Athlete	Group	Body weight	1	2	3	Result	1	2	3	Result	Total
1st place, gold medalist(s)	Om Yun-chol (PRK)	B	55.76	120	~~125~~	125	125	160	165	168	168	293
2nd place, silver medalist(s)	Wu Jingbiao (CHN)	A	55.91	~~130~~	130	133	133	~~156~~	156	~~161~~	156	289
3rd place, bronze medalist(s)	Trần Lê Quốc Toàn (VIE)	A	55.84	~~125~~	~~125~~	125	125	155	159	~~162~~	159	284
4	Jadi Setiadi (INA)	B	55.48	121	125	127	127	~~150~~	150	~~156~~	150	277
5	José Montes (MEX)	A	55.80	112	~~116~~	~~116~~	112	150	157	~~160~~	157	269
6	Sergio Rada (COL)	A	55.89	~~118~~	118	~~121~~	118	148	151	~~155~~	151	269
7	Carlos Berna (COL)	A	55.55	~~115~~	115	118	118	150	~~153~~	~~153~~	150	268
8	Sin Chol-bom (PRK)	B	55.72	~~110~~	110	113	113	145	~~150~~	~~150~~	145	258
9	Yasmani Romero (CUB)	B	55.95	~~112~~	112	~~116~~	112	142	~~146~~	146	146	258
10	Tom Goegebuer (BEL)	B	55.88	111	115	~~117~~	115	132	~~137~~	~~138~~	132	247
11	Manueli Tulo (FIJ)	B	55.77	100	105	~~110~~	105	128	~~132~~	~~132~~	128	233
12	Mirco Scarantino (ITA)	B	55.42	~~97~~	~~97~~	97	97	123	128	~~132~~	128	225
—	Sergio Álvarez (CUB)	A	55.96	117	121	~~125~~	121	~~150~~	~~150~~	~~150~~	—	—
—	Bekzat Osmonaliev (KGZ)	A	55.93	120	125	127	127	~~147~~	~~147~~	~~147~~	—	—
—	Ruslan Makarov (UZB)	A	55.96	~~117~~	117	~~119~~	117	~~145~~	~~145~~	~~145~~	—	—
—	Khalil El-Maaoui (TUN)	A	55.39	127	130	132	132	—	—	—	—	—
DQ	Valentin Hristov (AZE)	A	55.84	123	127	~~130~~	127	154	~~158~~	159	159	~~286~~
DQ	Florin Croitoru (ROU)	A	55.90	121	~~125~~	~~125~~	121	~~145~~	~~145~~	147	147	~~268~~

== New records ==
Clean & Jerk	168 kg	Om Yun-chol (PRK)	OR
