= Sin Chol-bom =

North Korean weightlifter (born 1990)

- Hangul: 신철범
- RR: Sin Cheolbeom
- MR: Sin Ch'ŏlbŏm

Sin Chol-Bom (Korean: 신철범, born 15 June 1990, Nampo) is a North Korean weightlifter. He competed at the 2012 Summer Olympics in the Men's 56 kg, finishing 10th.
