= Om Yun-chol =

North Korean weightlifter (born 1991)

Personal information
- Nationality: North Korean
- Born: 18 November 1991 (age 35) Chongjin, North Korea
- Height: 1.52 m (5 ft 0 in)
- Weight: 54.95 kg (121 lb)

Sport
- Country: North Korea
- Sport: Weightlifting
- Event: –55 kg
- Team: Amnokgang Sports Team

Achievements and titles
- Personal bests: Snatch: 134 kg (2016); Clean and jerk: 171 kg (2015); Total: 303 kg (2016)
Medal record
Men's weightlifting
Representing North Korea
Olympic Games
| Gold medal – first place | 2012 London | –56 kg |
| Silver medal – second place | 2016 Rio de Janeiro | –56 kg |
World Championships
| Gold medal – first place | 2013 Wrocław | –56 kg |
| Gold medal – first place | 2014 Almaty | –56 kg |
| Gold medal – first place | 2015 Houston | –56 kg |
| Gold medal – first place | 2018 Ashgabat | –55 kg |
| Gold medal – first place | 2019 Pattaya | –55 kg |
Asian Games
| Gold medal – first place | 2014 Incheon | –56 kg |
| Gold medal – first place | 2018 Jakarta-Palembang | –56 kg |
Asian Championships
| Gold medal – first place | 2013 Astana | –56 kg |
Summer Universiade
| Gold medal – first place | 2017 Taipei | — 56 kg |

- Om Yun-chol
- Hangul: 엄윤철
- Hanja: 嚴潤哲
- RR: Eom Yuncheol
- MR: Ŏm Yunch'ŏl

Om Yun-chol or Um Yoon-chul (Korean: 엄윤철; Korean pronunciation: [ʌ.mjun.tsʰʌl] or [ʌm] [jun.tsʰʌl]; born 18 November 1991) is a North Korean retired weightlifter, coach, Olympic Champion, and five time World Champion competing in the 56 kg category until 2018 and 55 kg starting in 2018 after the International Weightlifting Federation reorganized the categories. He is 152 centimetres (5 ft 0 in) and weighs 55 kilograms (121 lb). Om represents the Amnokgang Sports Team.

He is also the fourth man to lift over 3 times bodyweight in the clean & jerk multiple times after succeeding in breaking the world record clean and jerk of 169 kg in the −56 kg weight class during the Asian Interclub Championships, and has accomplished this feat 3 more times since the Asian Interclub Championships, at the 2014 Asian Games, 2015 World Weightlifting Championships, and the 2016 Summer Olympics.

He was also the sixth man to lift at least triple his bodyweight in the clean & jerk in international competition, having done so seven times; the others are Naim Süleymanoğlu, Stefan Topurov, Long Qingquan, Halil Mutlu, and Neno Terziyski.

He has set six senior world records throughout his career, five in the clean & jerk and one in the total.

== Early life ==
According to North Korean sources, he was born to a family of fishermen, in Sunam-guyok, Chongjin. Om was picked up by the weightlifting instructor Sin Gap-jun while practicing football at the local sports school.

== Career ==
=== Olympics ===
He won the gold medal at the 2012 Summer Olympics at the men's 56 kg event, setting an Olympic Record in the clean and jerk with 168 kg, all while competing in the B session. He became only the fifth man to ever clean and jerk three times his own body weight.

At the men's 56 kg weightlifting event at the 2016 Summer Olympics in Rio de Janeiro, Om was a favorite to renew his gold from London. After breaking his own Olympic record with a lift of 169 kg, Om was surpassed by Long Qingquan and had to settle for the silver medal.

=== World Championships ===
He won his first World Championships in 2013, one year removed from becoming Olympic Champion, by beating Long Qingquan by 2 kg.

In 2014 he defended his title as World Champion by lifting 296 kg at the 2014 World Weightlifting Championships. His total was tied with second place Thạch Kim Tuấn but he won by virtue of a lighter body weight (55.71 vs. 55.75).

Following his World Championship win in 2014 he was the heavy favorite to win his third World championship in a row. He ended up winning the gold medal at the 2015 World Weightlifting Championships in spectacular fashion, after trailing Wu Jingbiao by 8 kg in the snatch (during which he set a new world record snatch of 139 kg) Om Yun-chol outlifted Wu Jingbiao by 8 kg in the clean and jerk setting a new world record clean and jerk of 171 kg. Their totals of 302 kg were tied, but yet again Om Yun-chol won by virtue of a lighter body weight.

He did not compete in the 2017 World Weightlifting Championships due to the North Korean team issuing a boycott of the Championships.

In 2018 the International Weightlifting Federation reorganized the categories and he competed in the newly created 55 kg, he won his fourth World Championships by a margin of 24 kg over the second-place finisher, while winning gold medals in all lifts. During the clean and jerk portion of the competition he set a new world record of 162 kg.

=== Asian Games ===
At the 2014 Asian Games he won the gold medal in the 56 kg, in the clean and jerk portion he set a new world record lift of 170 kg. His total of 298 kg was an Asian Record at the time of competition.

At the next Asian Games in 2018 he was the favorite to win another gold medal at the Games. After finishing in second place after the snatch portion of the competition, 1 kg behind Thạch Kim Tuấn, he outlifted him by 8 kg in the clean and jerk portion of the competition securing his second Asian Games gold medal.

== Major results ==
| Year | Venue | Weight | Snatch (kg) | | | | Clean & Jerk (kg) | | | | Total | Rank |
| Year | Venue | Weight | 1 | 2 | 3 | Rank | 1 | 2 | 3 | Rank | Total | Rank |
Olympic Games
| 2012 | London, United Kingdom | 56 kg | 120 | ~~125~~ | 125 | 6 | 160 | 165 | 168 | 1 | 293 | 1st place, gold medalist(s) |
| 2016 | Rio de Janeiro, Brazil | 56 kg | 128 | 132 | 134 | 2 | 165 | ~~169~~ | 169 | 2 | 303 | 2nd place, silver medalist(s) |
World Championships
| 2011 | Paris, France | 56 kg | 115 | ~~118~~ | ~~118~~ | 10 | ~~152~~ | ~~152~~ | 152 | 5 | 267 | 6 |
| 2013 | Wrocław, Poland | 56 kg | 124 | 127 | ~~130~~ | 2nd place, silver medalist(s) | 162 | ~~170~~ | -- | 1st place, gold medalist(s) | 289 | 1st place, gold medalist(s) |
| 2014 | Almaty, Kazakhstan | 56 kg | ~~124~~ | 124 | 128 | 5 | ~~162~~ | 162 | 168 | 1st place, gold medalist(s) | 296 | 1st place, gold medalist(s) |
| 2015 | Houston, United States | 56 kg | 127 | 131 | ~~133~~ | 3rd place, bronze medalist(s) | 165 | 171 WR | ~~175~~ | 1st place, gold medalist(s) | 302 | 1st place, gold medalist(s) |
| 2018 | Ashgabat, Turkmenistan | 55 kg | 120 | ~~125~~ | ~~128~~ | 1st place, gold medalist(s) | 155 | ~~162~~ | 162 WR | 1st place, gold medalist(s) | 282 | 1st place, gold medalist(s) |
| 2019 | Pattaya, Thailand | 55 kg | 121 | 126 | 128 | 1st place, gold medalist(s) | 155 | ~~163~~ | 166 CWR | 1st place, gold medalist(s) | 294 CWR | 1st place, gold medalist(s) |
Asian Games
| 2014 | Incheon, South Korea | 56 kg | 123 | 128 | ~~131~~ | 3 | 160 | 166 | 170 WR | 1 | 298 | 1st place, gold medalist(s) |
| 2018 | Jakarta, Indonesia | 56 kg | 127 | ~~131~~ | ~~131~~ | 2 | 160 | ~~172~~ | ~~172~~ | 1 | 287 | 1st place, gold medalist(s) |
Asian Championships
| 2013 | Astana, Kazakhstan | 56 kg | 122 | ~~126~~ | 126 | 1st place, gold medalist(s) | 160 | ~~169~~ | ~~169~~ | 1st place, gold medalist(s) | 286 | 1st place, gold medalist(s) |
| 2019 | Ningbo, China | 61 kg | 125 | 130 | ~~133~~ | 7 | 165 | ~~172~~ | ~~172~~ | 4 | 295 | 6 |
Asian Interclub Championships
| 2013 | Pyongyang, North Korea | 56 kg | 115 | 118 | 120 | 1st place, gold medalist(s) | 155 | 169 WR | -- | 1st place, gold medalist(s) | 289 | 1st place, gold medalist(s) |
World Junior Championships
| 2011 | Penang, Malaysia | 56 kg | 115 | ~~121~~ | ~~121~~ | 6 | 150 | ~~156~~ | 156 | 1st place, gold medalist(s) | 271 | 4 |
Summer Universiade
| 2013 | New Taipei, Taiwan | 56 kg | 122 | 129 UR | -- | 1st place, gold medalist(s) | 155 | 165 UR | ~~172~~ | 1st place, gold medalist(s) | 294 UR | 1st place, gold medalist(s) |

- CWR: Current world record
- WR: World record
- UR: Universiade record

== Personal life ==
According to a 2019 article from Choson Sinbo, after his retirement in 2019, he graduated from Kim Hyong Jik University of Education with a major in athletics and working as a weightlifting researcher at the youth athletics school in the ministry of physical culture and sports.
