= Carlos Berna =

Colombian weightlifter (born 1990)

Personal information
- Full name: Carlos Andres Berna Gonzalez
- Nationality: Colombian
- Born: 21 January 1990 (age 36) Carepa, Colombia

Sport
- Country: Colombia
- Sport: Weightlifting
- Weight class: 56kg

Achievements and titles
- Olympic finals: 8th (2012)
Medal record
Representing Colombia
Men's weightlifting
World Championships
Bronze medal – third place	2017 Anaheim	56 kg
Pan American Games
Silver medal – second place	2015 Toronto	56 kg
Pan American Championships
Gold medal – first place	2017 Miami	56 kg
Silver medal – second place	2018 Santo Domingo	56 kg
Central American and Caribbean Games
Gold medal – first place	2014 Veracruz	56 kg S
Gold medal – first place	2014 Veracruz	56 kg CJ
Gold medal – first place	2018 Barranquilla	56 kg CJ
Silver medal – second place	2018 Barranquilla	56 kg S
South American Games
Gold medal – first place	2014 Santiago	56 kg
Gold medal – first place	2018 Cochabamba	56 kg
Bolivarian Games
Gold medal – first place	2017 Santa Marta	56 kg S
Gold medal – first place	2017 Santa Marta	56 kg CJ
Gold medal – first place	2017 Santa Marta	56 kg
- Updated on 3 September 2025

Carlos Andres Berna Gonzalez (born 21 January 1990 in Carepa) is a Colombian weightlifter. He competed at the 2012 Summer Olympics in the Men's 56 kg, finishing 8th. He also competed at the 2015 Pan American Games.
