= Surahmat Wijoyo =

Indonesian weightlifter (born 1988)

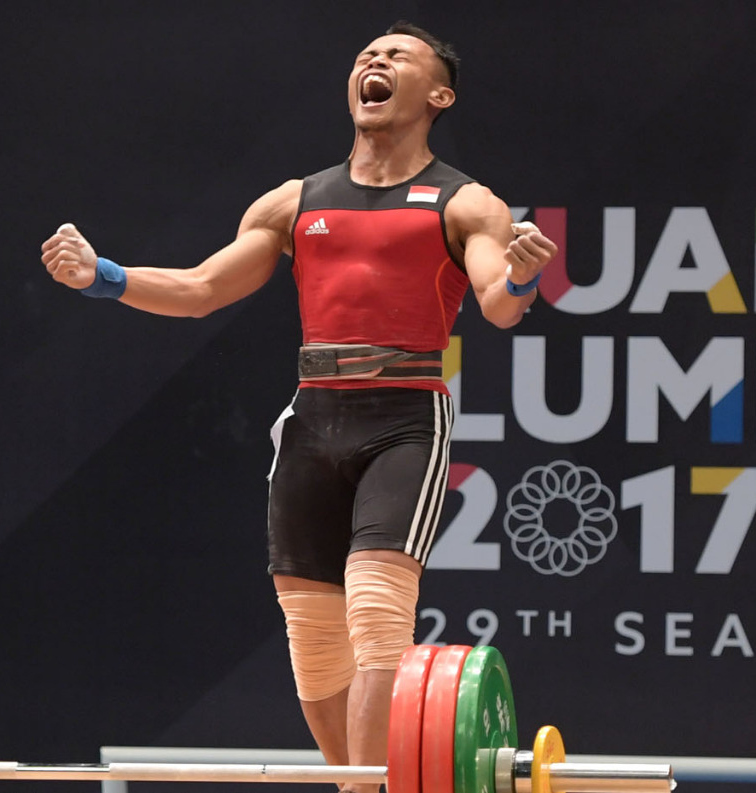
- Wijoyo at the 2017 Southeast Asian Games

Personal information
- Born: 11 May 1988 (age 38) Blora Regency, Indonesia
- Education: University of Abulyatama
- Height: 160 cm (5 ft 3 in)

Sport
- Sport: Weightlifting
- Coached by: Dirdja Wihardja
Medal record
Men's weightlifting
Representing Indonesia
IWF World Cup
Silver medal – second place	2019 Fuzhou	–55 kg
Asian Games
Bronze medal – third place	2018 Jakarta-Palembang	–56 kg
Summer Universiade
Silver medal – second place	2011 Shenzhen	−56 kg
Islamic Solidarity Games
Gold medal – first place	2017 Baku	56 kg
Southeast Asian Games
Silver medal – second place	2017 Kuala Lumpur	–56 kg
Bronze medal – third place	2019 Philippines	–55 kg

Surahmat bin Suwoto Wijoyo (born 11 May 1988) is an Indonesian weightlifter. Competing in the 56 kg body weight division he won silver medals at the 2011 Summer Universiade and 2017 Southeast Asian Games, and a bronze medal at the 2018 Asian Games.
