= Hiroaki Takao =

Japanese weightlifter

Personal information
- Nationality: Japanese
- Born: 2 January 1992 (age 33)
- Height: 1.56 m (5 ft 1 in)
- Weight: 56 kg (123 lb)

Sport
- Country: Japan
- Sport: Weightlifting

Hiroaki Takao (高尾 宏明, Takao Hiroaki; born 2 January 1992) is a Japanese Olympic weightlifter. He represented his country at the 2016 Summer Olympics.
