= Josué Brachi =

Spanish weightlifter (born 1992)

Josué Brachi García
Personal information
- Full name: Josué Brachi García
- Nationality: Spanish
- Born: 8 September 1992 (age 33) Spain
- Weight: 55.74 kg (122.9 lb)

Sport
- Country: Spain
- Sport: Weightlifting
Medal record
Representing Spain
European Championships
Gold medal – first place	2018 Bucharest	–56 kg
Silver medal – second place	2016 Førde	–56 kg
Silver medal – second place	2022 Tirana	–55 kg
- Updated on 31 August 2016

Josué Brachi García (born 8 September 1992) is a Spanish male weightlifter, competing in the 56 kg category and representing Spain at international competitions. He participated at the 2016 Summer Olympics in the men's 56 kg event. He competed at world championships, including at the 2015 World Weightlifting Championships.

== Major results ==
Year	Venue	Weight	Snatch (kg)				Clean & Jerk (kg)				Total	Rank
Year	Venue	Weight	1	2	3	Rank	1	2	3	Rank	Total	Rank
World Championships
2019			115	~~118~~	~~118~~		~~145~~	~~145~~	~~145~~			
2017	Anaheim, United States	56 kg	116	118	~~120~~	3rd place, bronze medalist(s)	135	138	140	5	258	5
2015	Houston, United States	56 kg	115	118	120	7	138	140	~~143~~	16	260	11
2014	Almaty, Kazakhstan	56 kg	114	~~118~~	~~118~~	15	~~133~~	133	~~138~~	24	247	22
2013	Wrocław, Poland	56 kg	109	113	~~115~~	8	133	~~136~~	~~136~~	11	246	9
2011	Paris, France	56 kg	103	~~107~~	107	23	125	130	~~133~~	24	237	22
2010	Antalya, Turkey	56 kg	102	105	~~109~~	22	122	126	129	21	234	21
