= Long Qingquan =

Chinese weightlifter (born 1990)

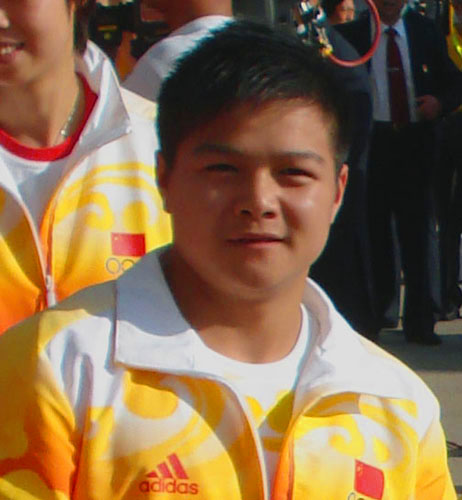
- Long Qingquan in 2008

Personal information
- Nationality: Chinese
- Born: December 3, 1990 (age 35) Longshan, Hunan, China
- Height: 1.56 m (5 ft 1 in)
- Weight: 56 kg (123 lb)

Sport
- Country: China
- Sport: Weightlifting
- Event: -56 kg

Achievements and titles
- Personal bests: Snatch: 137 kg (2016); Clean & Jerk: 170 kg (2016); Total: 307 kg (2016, WR)
Medal record
Men's Weightlifting
Olympic Games
Gold medal – first place	2008 Beijing	–56 kg
Gold medal – first place	2016 Rio de Janeiro	–56 kg
World Championships
Gold medal – first place	2009 Goyang	–56 kg
Silver medal – second place	2010 Antalya	–56 kg
Silver medal – second place	2013 Wrocław	–56 kg
Bronze medal – third place	2014 Almaty	–56 kg

Long Qingquan (simplified Chinese: 龙清泉; traditional Chinese: 龍清泉; pinyin: Lóng Qīngquán, born 3 December 1990) is a Chinese former weightlifter and sports official of Miao ethnicity. He won the gold medal in the men's 56 kg division at both the 2008 Summer Olympics in Beijing and the 2016 Summer Olympics in Rio de Janeiro, where he set a world record total of 307 kg. He was the first weightlifter to win Olympic titles eight years apart. After retiring, he became an official of the Hunan Provincial Sports Bureau and a member of the Hunan Provincial Committee of the Chinese People's Political Consultative Conference.

== Early life ==
Long was born on 3 December 1990 in Longshan County, in the Xiangxi Tujia and Miao Autonomous Prefecture of Hunan. As a child, he trained at the Longshan County sports school, where he was spotted by a coach. In 1999, at the age of nine, he joined the weightlifting squad of the Xiangxi Prefecture sports school. In 2002, aged 12, he won the men's 38 kg title at the Hunan Provincial Games in Taojiang, Yiyang, and the victory led to his selection for provincial training. He later rose through the Hunan provincial team to the national team.

== Career ==
=== 2008 Olympic title ===
Long was selected for the 56 kg class at the 2008 Summer Olympics in Beijing after a strong performance at China's team trials. Competing in his first international event at the age of 17, he won the gold medal with a total of 292 kg, made up of a 132 kg snatch and a 160 kg clean and jerk. He set two junior world records on his way to the title. He became China's first Olympic champion born in the 1990s. After the event, he admitted to having been nervous, and he described himself as "not very well disciplined", saying that he spent a lot of time playing electronic games. He also said that his target was the Turkish world record holder Halil Mutlu, whom he hoped to surpass.

=== 2009–2015 ===
In October 2009, Long won the men's 56 kg title at the 11th National Games in Jinan with a total of 302 kg, which broke a national record that had stood for 11 years. According to China News Service, his 169 kg clean and jerk at the Games was heavier than Mutlu's world record. The following month, he won the gold medal in the 56 kg category at the 2009 World Weightlifting Championships in Goyang, with a total of 292 kg.

Long failed to defend his world title in 2010, when his compatriot Wu Jingbiao beat him for the gold medal. He was not entered for the 2011 Championships in Paris after missing all three of his snatch attempts at 130 kg at the Chinese trials a month earlier. He again lost to Wu in the national trials for the 2012 Summer Olympics in London. According to The Paper, Long had been unprepared for sudden fame after his Olympic victory, and he often left training after about an hour to go drinking with friends, which cost him his place at the London Games. He later said that fame had at one point made him lose his sense of self. After failing to qualify for London, he returned to Longshan, where an older man advised him to start again, as farmers do every spring even after a failed harvest.

He won the 56 kg title again at the 12th National Games in Liaoning. At the 2013 World Weightlifting Championships in Wrocław, he won the silver medal behind the 2012 Olympic champion, Om Yun-chol of North Korea, although Long won the snatch with 130 kg. He won the bronze medal at the 2014 World Weightlifting Championships in Almaty. At the 2015 World Weightlifting Championships in Houston, he failed all three of his snatch attempts at 131 kg. In 2015, the national team's deputy head coach, Yu Jie, began coaching him, and his total of 298 kg at that year's national championships was his best result since 2009.

=== 2016 Olympic title ===
In April 2016, Long won the national championships, which also served as the selection event for the Rio Olympics, with a total of 300 kg, beating Wu Jingbiao to a place in the team. Before the Games, he trained at a closed camp in Tianjin for about a month.

At the 2016 Summer Olympics in Rio de Janeiro, Long won the gold medal with a total of 307 kg, made up of a 137 kg snatch and a 170 kg clean and jerk. The total broke the world record of 305 kg that Mutlu had set at the 2000 Summer Olympics in Sydney, which had been the oldest total world record in weightlifting. His 170 kg clean and jerk, made with his final attempt, was an Olympic record, and it secured victory over Om Yun-chol, who took the silver medal with 303 kg. Long later said that he had never lifted 170 kg in training. He became the first weightlifter, male or female, to win Olympic titles eight years apart. When asked whether he and Om were the strongest men in the world, he replied that they were among human beings, "but not in the animal kingdom – remember how strong an ant is!" In December 2016, he received the Best Breakthrough award at the Laureus China sports awards.

=== Injury and retirement ===
In July 2017, Long injured his left wrist during clean and jerk training. On the advice of the team doctor, he withdrew from the men's 56 kg event at the 13th National Games in Tianjin, where he had been aiming for a third consecutive title. He said at the time that his long-term goal was to compete at the 2020 Summer Olympics in Tokyo. He later retired from competition.

== Post-sports career ==
After retiring, Long joined the Hunan Provincial Sports Bureau, and by January 2023 he was working as an official in its youth sports division. He described the change as a move from the spotlight to providing service behind the scenes. By April 2024, he was deputy director of the bureau's competitive sports division. He has said that the Olympics now mainly represent for him the passing on of the Olympic spirit.

Long was a delegate to the 11th Hunan Provincial Congress of the Chinese Communist Party. In May 2022, he was named one of the first health ambassadors from Hunan's sports community. In January 2023, he became a member of the 13th Hunan Provincial Committee of the Chinese People's Political Consultative Conference (CPPCC). As a new member, he said that he wanted to focus on youth sports and on the training of young coaches, noting that many grassroots coaches born in the 1960s were nearing retirement. He also called for better retirement security, re-employment support and training for athletes. In April 2024, he joined a CPPCC inspection tour on the integration of sport and education, which visited schools in Longshan and Guzhang counties.

Long has taken part several times in a provincial campaign, begun in 2021, that brings Hunan's sports champions into schools and other communities. In October 2021, the College of Physical Education of Hunan Normal University appointed him and eight other champions as off-campus advisers. In September 2025, he was appointed a student mentor at an independent college of Central South University of Forestry and Technology, where he and the Olympic champion Xiang Yanmei spoke to nearly 6,000 students and staff.

== Personal life ==
By 2016, Long was married and had a son. During his preparations for the Rio Olympics, his wife and son lived in Changsha, and he saw his son only occasionally by video call. His parents lived elsewhere and rarely called him, because they did not want to disturb his training. His coach, Yu Jie, said that having a child had given Long a greater sense of responsibility. After his victory in Rio, Long said that his family had helped him through his preparations.
