= Witoon Mingmoon =

Thai weightlifter

Personal information
- Nationality: Thai
- Born: 10 February 1996 (age 30)
- Height: 1.57 m (5 ft 2 in)
- Weight: 56 kg (123 lb)

Sport
- Country: Thailand
- Sport: Weightlifting
Medal record
World Championships
Disqualified	2017 Anaheim	–56 kg

Witoon Mingmoon (born 10 February 1996) is a Thai Olympic weightlifter. He represented his country at the 2016 Summer Olympics.
