= Sinphet Kruaithong =

Thai weightlifter (born 1995)

Sinphet Kruaithong BBh
Personal information
- Nickname: Dui (ดุ่ย)
- Nationality: Thai
- Born: 22 August 1995 (age 31) Chumphon Buri District, Surin Province, Thailand
- Height: 1.59 m (5 ft 3 in)
- Weight: 55 kg (121 lb)

Sport
- Country: Thailand
- Sport: Weightlifting
Medal record
Olympic Games
Bronze medal – third place	2016 Rio de Janeiro	–56 kg

Sinphet "Dui" Kruaithong (Thai: สินธุ์เพชร กรวยทอง; born 22 August 1995 in Chumphon Buri District, Surin Province) is a Thai Olympic weightlifter. He represented his country at the 2016 Summer Olympics, where he won the bronze medal. With this he became the first Thai male weightlifter to win an olympic medal. His grandmother died while celebrating his victory.
