= Nestor Colonia =

Filipino weightlifter (born 1992)

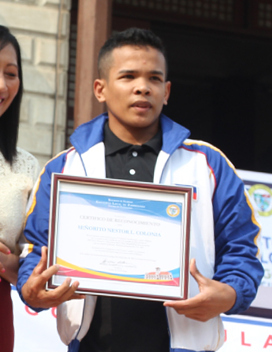
- Nestor Colonia in 2015

Personal information
- Born: February 16, 1992 (age 34) Zamboanga City
- Height: 1.58 m (5 ft 2 in)
- Weight: 55 kg (121 lb)

Sport
- Sport: Weightlifting
- Coached by: Gregorio Colonia
Medal record
Event	1st	2nd	3rd
World Championships	0	0	1
Asian Championships	1	0	0
Southeast Asian Games	0	0	1
Total	1	0	2
Representing Philippines
World Championships
Bronze medal – third place	2015 Houston	-56 kg
Asian Championships
Gold medal – first place	2015 Phuket	-56 kg
Southeast Asian Games
Bronze medal – third place	2019 Philippines	-67 kg

Nestor Landag Colonia (born February 16, 1992) is a flyweight weightlifter from the Philippines. He won the 2015 Asian Championships and placed third in the clean and jerk at the 2015 World and 2016 Asian Championships. He qualified for the 2016 Summer Olympics. He is coached by his uncle Gregorio Colonia, who competed at the 1988 Olympics.

Airman 2nd Class Colonia is also part of the Philippine Air Force weightlifting team, together with Hidilyn Diaz.
