= Trần Lê Quốc Toàn =

Vietnamese weightlifter (born 1989)

Personal information
- Nationality: Vietnamese
- Born: 5 April 1989 (age 37) Da Nang, Vietnam
- Height: 1.50 m (4 ft 11 in)
- Weight: 56 kg (123 lb)

Sport
- Country: Vietnam
- Sport: Weightlifting
- Event: 56kg
- Coached by: Nguyen Van Ngoc

Achievements and titles
- Olympic finals: 2012 Summer Olympics and 2016 Summer Olympics
- National finals: Vietnam
- Highest world ranking: 3
- Personal best: 284kg
Medal record
Men's weightlifting
Representing Vietnam
Summer Olympics
Bronze medal – third place	2012 London	-56 kg
World Championships
Silver medal – second place	2017 Anaheim	–56 kg
Asian Championships
Silver medal – second place	2012 Pyeongtaek	–56kg
Bronze medal – third place	2013 Astana	–56kg
Southeast Asian Games
Gold medal – first place	2011 Indonesia	–56kg

Trần Lê Quốc Toàn (born 5 April 1989) is a male Vietnamese weightlifter who competed at the 2012 Summer Olympics in the -56 kg class. He initially finished 4th, however was awarded the bronze medal in 2019, after the originally 3rd Valentin Hristov of Azerbaijan was disqualified for doping.

He placed 4th in both the 2012 and 2013 World Championships behind Valentin Hristov and compatriot Thach Kim Tuan.

Trần Lê Quốc Toàn finished in 5th at the 2016 Olympics, with a total of 275 kg (snatch = 121 kg, clean and jerk = 154 kg).
