= Wu Jingbiao =

Chinese weightlifter (born 1989)

Personal information
- Nationality: Chinese
- Born: January 10, 1989 (age 37) Changle, Fuzhou, China
- Height: 1.63 m (5 ft 4 in)
- Weight: 56 kg (123 lb)

Sport
- Country: China
- Sport: Weightlifting
- Event: 56kg
- Coached by: Chen Wenbin
Medal record
Men's weightlifting
Representing China
Summer Olympics
Silver medal – second place	2012 London	56 kg
World Weightlifting Championships
Gold medal – first place	2010 Antalya	– 56 kg
Gold medal – first place	2011 Paris	– 56 kg
Silver medal – second place	2009 Goyang	– 56 kg
Silver medal – second place	2015 Houston	– 56 kg
Asian Games
Gold medal – first place	2010 Guangzhou	– 56 kg
Bronze medal – third place	2014 Incheon	– 56 kg
Asian Championships
Gold medal – first place	2011 Tongling	– 56 kg
Silver medal – second place	2008 Kanazawa	– 56 kg

Wu Jingbiao (simplified Chinese: 吴景彪; traditional Chinese: 吳景彪; pinyin: Wú Jǐngbiāo; born January 10, 1989, Changle) is a Chinese weightlifter. He won the silver medal at the London 2012 Olympics in the category of weightlifting. After winning the silver medal, he apologized for "shaming the motherland" by not winning a gold medal.

== See also ==
- China at the 2012 Summer Olympics
