= 2007 World Weightlifting Championships – Men's 62 kg =

The men's competition in 62 kg division was staged on September 18–19, 2007.

== Schedule ==
Date	Time	Event
18 September 2007	09:30	Group D
18 September 2007	12:00	Group C
18 September 2007	14:30	Group B
19 September 2007	14:30	Group A

== Medalists ==
Event	Gold		Silver		Bronze	
Snatch	Yang Fan (CHN)	142 kg	Im Yong-su (PRK)	142 kg	Ivaylo Filev (BUL)	138 kg
Clean & Jerk	Yang Fan (CHN)	173 kg	Im Yong-su (PRK)	173 kg	Ivaylo Filev (BUL)	163 kg
Total	Yang Fan (CHN)	315 kg	Im Yong-su (PRK)	315 kg	Ivaylo Filev (BUL)	301 kg

== Records ==
Prior to this competition, the existing world records were as follows.

World Record	Snatch	Shi Zhiyong (CHN)	153 kg	İzmir, Turkey	28 June 2002
World Record	Clean & Jerk	Le Maosheng (CHN)	182 kg	Busan, South Korea	2 October 2002
World Record	Total	World Standard	325 kg	—	1 January 1998

== Results ==
Rank	Athlete	Group	Body weight	Snatch (kg)				Clean & Jerk (kg)				Total
Rank	Athlete	Group	Body weight	1	2	3	Rank	1	2	3	Rank	Total
1st place, gold medalist(s)	Yang Fan (CHN)	A	61.65	139	142	~~144~~	1st place, gold medalist(s)	169	172	173	1st place, gold medalist(s)	315
2nd place, silver medalist(s)	Im Yong-su (PRK)	A	61.79	137	140	142	2nd place, silver medalist(s)	168	~~172~~	173	2nd place, silver medalist(s)	315
3rd place, bronze medalist(s)	Ivaylo Filev (BUL)	A	61.86	134	136	138	3rd place, bronze medalist(s)	161	163	~~164~~	3rd place, bronze medalist(s)	301
4	Óscar Figueroa (COL)	A	61.75	135	~~140~~	~~140~~	6	~~160~~	160	~~165~~	8	295
5	Ümürbek Bazarbaýew (TKM)	A	61.96	132	~~136~~	~~137~~	8	157	162	~~165~~	5	294
6	Diego Salazar (COL)	A	61.45	130	133	~~135~~	7	155	~~160~~	160	7	293
7	Triyatno (INA)	A	61.86	~~131~~	131	~~137~~	9	160	~~170~~	~~170~~	9	291
8	Yasen Stoyanov (BUL)	A	61.86	124	~~128~~	128	11	157	~~163~~	163	4	291
9	Nguyễn Mạnh Thắng (VIE)	B	61.61	130	135	~~137~~	5	~~155~~	155	~~160~~	15	290
10	Henadzi Makhveyenia (BLR)	A	61.81	127	~~132~~	~~132~~	13	~~155~~	155	161	6	288
11	Niwat Kritphet (THA)	B	61.48	122	~~126~~	126	14	155	~~157~~	158	11	284
12	Mohamed Abdelbaki (EGY)	B	61.68	125	127	~~130~~	12	153	~~157~~	157	13	284
13	Yang Sheng-hsiung (TPE)	C	61.50	120	~~125~~	125	16	152	158	~~162~~	12	283
14	Sardar Hasanov (AZE)	B	61.59	125	128	130	10	150	~~155~~	~~155~~	23	280
15	Vladimir Popov (MDA)	A	61.65	126	~~130~~	~~130~~	15	154	~~159~~	~~159~~	18	280
16	Lee Chang-ho (KOR)	B	61.97	120	~~123~~	~~123~~	31	155	160	~~165~~	10	280
17	Jesús López (VEN)	C	61.90	117	121	123	18	150	~~155~~	155	16	278
18	Tolkunbek Hudaýbergenow (TKM)	B	61.84	120	~~125~~	~~125~~	30	151	156	~~160~~	14	276
19	Zulfugar Suleymanov (AZE)	B	61.14	117	122	~~124~~	20	152	~~159~~	~~159~~	20	274
20	Samson Matam (FRA)	B	61.99	~~123~~	123	~~126~~	19	148	~~151~~	151	21	274
21	Oleg Sîrghi (MDA)	B	60.96	114	118	120	26	152	~~158~~	~~158~~	19	272
22	Antoniu Buci (ROU)	C	61.80	116	120	122	21	145	~~150~~	150	25	272
23	Toshio Imamura (JPN)	C	61.58	117	120	~~121~~	28	144	148	150	22	270
24	Katsuhiko Uechi (JPN)	C	61.80	113	117	120	29	145	150	~~153~~	24	270
25	Naharudin Mahayudin (MAS)	C	61.83	116	120	125	17	145	~~150~~	~~150~~	30	270
26	Yinka Ayenuwa (NGR)	C	61.91	107	112	115	37	151	155	~~160~~	17	270
27	Tom Goegebuer (BEL)	B	61.17	121	~~126~~	~~126~~	23	~~147~~	147	~~151~~	27	268
28	Giuliano Cornetta (ITA)	C	61.81	115	119	121	25	145	~~150~~	~~150~~	29	266
29	Dimitris Minasidis (CYP)	C	61.17	~~117~~	117	~~120~~	33	145	148	~~151~~	26	265
30	Chatchai Phunsombat (THA)	C	61.04	112	117	~~120~~	32	140	~~145~~	145	28	262
31	Aurelian Baciu (ROU)	D	61.82	111	115	117	34	135	141	~~145~~	32	258
32	Jasvir Singh (CAN)	D	61.44	109	113	~~116~~	38	143	~~148~~	~~148~~	31	256
33	Bekzat Osmonaliev (KGZ)	D	60.95	110	115	~~120~~	35	132	140	~~143~~	33	255
34	Iván García (ESP)	D	61.60	107	110	115	36	132	137	~~142~~	35	252
35	Kevin Stuart (GBR)	D	61.84	107	112	~~115~~	39	~~130~~	130	135	37	247
36	Davíd Mendoza (HON)	D	61.52	~~100~~	100	~~105~~	41	130	135	~~137~~	36	235
37	Bronco Deiranauw (NRU)	D	61.58	95	100	~~105~~	42	121	~~130~~	130	38	230
38	Rakesh Ranjeet (NEP)	D	61.82	~~100~~	100	~~107~~	43	130	~~136~~	~~136~~	39	230
—	Qiu Le (CHN)	A	61.39	137	~~141~~	~~141~~	4	—	—	—	—	—
—	Amirul Hamizan Ibrahim (MAS)	C	61.93	~~120~~	122	~~126~~	22	~~150~~	~~150~~	~~150~~	—	—
—	Chinthana Vidanage (SRI)	B	61.75	121	~~125~~	~~125~~	24	~~160~~	~~160~~	~~160~~	—	—
—	Ruslan Alpanov (UZB)	B	61.58	120	~~125~~	~~125~~	27	~~145~~	~~145~~	~~145~~	—	—
—	Yusufjon Yoqubov (TJK)	D	61.87	100	105	~~106~~	40	~~140~~	—	—	—	—
—	Kim Kum-sok (PRK)	A	61.94	~~135~~	~~135~~	~~135~~	—	~~165~~	~~165~~	~~165~~	—	—
—	Adán Rosales (CUB)	B	61.82	~~122~~	~~122~~	~~122~~	—	~~159~~	—	—	—	—
—	Petr Slabý (CZE)	D	61.98	~~108~~	~~108~~	~~108~~	—	~~140~~	140	~~145~~	34	—
DQ	Marwan Abdulhameed (YEM)	D	61.14	110	115	~~120~~	—	140	~~145~~	~~145~~	—	—
