= 2006 World Weightlifting Championships – Men's 62 kg =

The 2006 World Weightlifting Championships were held in Santo Domingo, Dominican Republic from 30 September to 7 October. The men's 62 kilograms division was staged on 30 September and 1 October 2006.

== Schedule ==
Date	Time	Event
30 September 2006	18:00	Group D
30 September 2006	20:00	Group C
1 October 2006	10:00	Group B
1 October 2006	14:00	Group A

== Medalists ==
Event	Gold		Silver		Bronze	
Snatch	Qiu Le (CHN)	140 kg	Óscar Figueroa (COL)	137 kg	Israel José Rubio (VEN)	133 kg
Clean & Jerk	Qiu Le (CHN)	168 kg	Manuel Minginfel (FSM)	165 kg	Diego Salazar (COL)	164 kg
Total	Qiu Le (CHN)	308 kg	Óscar Figueroa (COL)	297 kg	Diego Salazar (COL)	295 kg

== Records ==
Prior to this competition, the existing world records were as follows.

World Record	Snatch	Shi Zhiyong (CHN)	153 kg	İzmir, Turkey	28 June 2002
World Record	Clean & Jerk	Le Maosheng (CHN)	182 kg	Busan, South Korea	2 October 2002
World Record	Total	World Standard	325 kg	—	1 January 1998

== Results ==
Rank	Athlete	Group	Body weight	Snatch (kg)				Clean & Jerk (kg)				Total
Rank	Athlete	Group	Body weight	1	2	3	Rank	1	2	3	Rank	Total
1st place, gold medalist(s)	Qiu Le (CHN)	A	61.41	138	~~140~~	140	1st place, gold medalist(s)	168	~~178~~	~~178~~	1st place, gold medalist(s)	308
2nd place, silver medalist(s)	Óscar Figueroa (COL)	A	61.62	132	137	~~141~~	2nd place, silver medalist(s)	160	~~164~~	~~164~~	5	297
3rd place, bronze medalist(s)	Diego Salazar (COL)	A	61.70	127	~~131~~	131	5	160	164	~~167~~	3rd place, bronze medalist(s)	295
4	Manuel Minginfel (FSM)	A	61.80	123	128	~~131~~	10	161	~~165~~	165	2nd place, silver medalist(s)	293
5	Henadzi Makhveyenia (BLR)	B	61.97	122	130	~~133~~	9	153	158	160	6	290
6	Adán Rosales (CUB)	A	61.79	122	127	~~130~~	13	162	~~167~~	~~167~~	4	289
7	Ji Hun-min (KOR)	B	61.81	125	130	132	4	150	155	~~158~~	11	287
8	Mohamed Abdelbaki (EGY)	A	62.00	127	131	~~133~~	6	~~155~~	155	~~158~~	12	286
9	Triyatno (INA)	B	60.98	125	130	~~132~~	7	~~155~~	~~155~~	155	7	285
10	Vladimir Popov (MDA)	A	61.61	122	125	127	14	153	~~155~~	155	9	280
11	Leonidas Sabanis (GRE)	A	61.84	~~130~~	~~130~~	130	8	145	150	~~156~~	16	280
12	Oleksiy Skvorodnyev (UKR)	C	61.90	121	125	128	11	145	152	~~157~~	15	280
13	Adrian Jigău (ROM)	A	61.61	123	127	~~130~~	12	152	~~156~~	~~156~~	14	279
14	Yang Sheng-hsiung (TPE)	B	61.68	~~122~~	~~122~~	122	17	~~155~~	155	~~160~~	10	277
15	Tolkunbek Hudaýbergenow (TKM)	C	61.44	115	121	~~125~~	18	150	~~155~~	155	8	276
16	Samson Matam (FRA)	B	61.88	120	~~123~~	123	16	150	~~154~~	~~154~~	17	273
17	Jesús López (VEN)	C	61.53	115	~~120~~	120	19	148	152	~~157~~	13	272
18	Pramot Phetcharat (THA)	C	61.66	~~120~~	120	~~125~~	20	147	~~153~~	—	20	267
19	Ümürbek Bazarbaýew (TKM)	B	61.74	~~120~~	120	~~125~~	21	~~145~~	145	~~153~~	22	265
20	Yasen Stoyanov (BUL)	C	61.93	~~115~~	115	119	23	145	~~150~~	~~150~~	24	264
21	Katsuhiko Uechi (JPN)	C	61.75	110	~~115~~	115	29	148	~~153~~	~~153~~	18	263
22	Giuliano Cornetta (ITA)	C	61.85	111	116	~~118~~	26	141	~~145~~	145	23	261
23	Toshio Imamura (JPN)	C	61.47	111	116	~~119~~	25	137	142	144	25	260
24	Gert Trasha (ALB)	C	61.77	120	~~123~~	—	22	~~140~~	140	~~145~~	32	260
25	Oleg Sîrghi (MDA)	C	61.35	107	112	~~115~~	30	~~147~~	147	~~152~~	19	259
26	Asif Malikov (AZE)	C	61.59	~~115~~	115	~~118~~	28	137	142	~~146~~	26	257
27	Carlos Márquez (ECU)	C	61.77	~~107~~	107	110	33	142	147	~~152~~	21	257
28	Briken Calja (ALB)	D	61.31	110	~~115~~	116	24	140	~~145~~	~~145~~	29	256
29	Iván García (ESP)	D	61.45	110	~~115~~	115	27	135	~~140~~	140	31	255
30	Luca Bardis (FRA)	D	61.66	107	111	~~114~~	31	137	141	~~145~~	28	252
31	José Erazo (ECU)	D	61.40	~~110~~	110	~~114~~	32	140	~~146~~	~~146~~	30	250
32	Petr Slabý (CZE)	D	61.79	~~107~~	107	~~110~~	35	138	142	~~145~~	27	249
33	Ruslan Alpanov (UZB)	D	61.77	102	107	~~112~~	34	133	~~139~~	—	33	240
34	Alberto Almánzar (DOM)	D	61.35	~~94~~	94	100	36	115	125	128	34	228
35	Ensar Musić (CRO)	D	61.75	90	95	~~101~~	37	~~120~~	~~120~~	120	35	215
36	José Araya (CHI)	D	60.52	90	~~94~~	~~94~~	38	110	115	~~118~~	36	205
—	Zhang Ping (CHN)	A	61.70	~~138~~	~~138~~	~~138~~	—	~~162~~	~~162~~	~~162~~	—	—
—	Erol Bilgin (TUR)	B	61.98	~~125~~	125	~~129~~	15	~~155~~	~~155~~	~~155~~	—	—
—	Israel José Rubio (VEN)	B	61.64	125	130	133	3rd place, bronze medalist(s)	~~156~~	~~156~~	~~156~~	—	—
—	Tom Goegebuer (BEL)	B	61.81	~~119~~	~~119~~	~~119~~	—	—	—	—	—	—
