= 2003 World Weightlifting Championships – Men's 62 kg =

The 2003 World Weightlifting Championships were held in Vancouver, Canada from 14 November to 22 November. The men's 62 kilograms division was staged on 14 and 15 November 2003.

== Schedule ==
Date	Time	Event
14 November 2003	11:00	Group D
14 November 2003	14:30	Group C
15 November 2003	10:00	Group B
15 November 2003	12:30	Group A

== Medalists ==
Event	Gold		Silver		Bronze	
Snatch	Halil Mutlu (TUR)	147.5 kg	Shi Zhiyong (CHN)	147.5 kg	Le Maosheng (CHN)	135.0 kg
Clean & Jerk	Halil Mutlu (TUR)	175.0 kg	Shi Zhiyong (CHN)	170.0 kg	Le Maosheng (CHN)	170.0 kg
Total	Halil Mutlu (TUR)	322.5 kg	Shi Zhiyong (CHN)	317.5 kg	Le Maosheng (CHN)	305.0 kg

== Records ==
Prior to this competition, the existing world records were as follows.

World Record	Snatch	Shi Zhiyong (CHN)	153.0 kg	İzmir, Turkey	28 June 2002
World Record	Clean & Jerk	Le Maosheng (CHN)	182.5 kg	Busan, South Korea	2 October 2002
World Record	Total	World Standard	325.0 kg	—	1 January 1998

== Results ==
Rank	Athlete	Group	Body weight	Snatch (kg)				Clean & Jerk (kg)				Total
Rank	Athlete	Group	Body weight	1	2	3	Rank	1	2	3	Rank	Total
1st place, gold medalist(s)	Halil Mutlu (TUR)	A	61.02	~~145.0~~	145.0	147.5	1st place, gold medalist(s)	~~175.0~~	175.0	~~180.0~~	1st place, gold medalist(s)	322.5
2nd place, silver medalist(s)	Shi Zhiyong (CHN)	A	61.62	147.5	~~152.5~~	~~152.5~~	2nd place, silver medalist(s)	~~170.0~~	170.0	~~177.5~~	2nd place, silver medalist(s)	317.5
3rd place, bronze medalist(s)	Le Maosheng (CHN)	A	61.88	~~135.0~~	135.0	~~142.5~~	3rd place, bronze medalist(s)	170.0	~~177.5~~	~~177.5~~	3rd place, bronze medalist(s)	305.0
4	Diego Salazar (COL)	A	61.86	130.0	~~135.0~~	~~135.0~~	6	160.0	~~165.0~~	165.0	5	295.0
5	Armen Ghazaryan (ARM)	A	61.77	~~127.5~~	127.5	~~135.0~~	8	165.0	~~170.0~~	~~170.0~~	4	292.5
6	Oleksandr Likhvald (UKR)	B	61.88	125.0	130.0	132.5	4	155.0	160.0	~~162.5~~	6	292.5
7	Ümürbek Bazarbaýew (TKM)	B	61.95	125.0	130.0	132.5	5	155.0	160.0	~~165.0~~	7	292.5
8	Samson Matam (FRA)	B	61.82	120.0	~~127.5~~	127.5	10	155.0	~~160.0~~	~~160.0~~	10	282.5
9	Sunarto Rasidi (INA)	B	61.59	125.0	~~130.0~~	~~130.0~~	12	~~155.0~~	155.0	~~160.0~~	9	280.0
10	Vasile Costea (ROM)	B	61.80	120.0	125.0	127.5	9	152.5	~~160.0~~	~~160.0~~	11	280.0
11	Roger Berrio (COL)	C	61.42	120.0	125.0	~~127.5~~	11	~~147.5~~	147.5	150.0	13	275.0
12	Ali Al-Dhilab (KSA)	C	61.45	120.0	127.5	~~130.0~~	7	~~145.0~~	145.0	~~152.5~~	17	272.5
13	Kazumi Saito (JPN)	B	61.58	~~117.5~~	117.5	~~120.0~~	18	155.0	~~157.5~~	~~157.5~~	8	272.5
14	Kenji Tominaga (JPN)	B	61.75	120.0	~~122.5~~	~~122.5~~	16	150.0	~~155.0~~	~~155.0~~	16	270.0
15	Manuel Minginfel (FSM)	C	61.51	112.5	117.5	~~122.5~~	17	145.0	~~150.0~~	150.0	14	267.5
16	Hassan Ghassem (SYR)	C	61.74	117.5	122.5	~~125.0~~	15	~~142.5~~	145.0	~~152.5~~	18	267.5
17	Giuliano Cornetta (ITA)	D	61.70	~~115.0~~	~~115.0~~	115.0	22	145.0	150.0	~~155.0~~	15	265.0
18	Yang Sheng-hsiung (TPE)	C	61.29	110.0	~~115.0~~	~~115.0~~	26	145.0	150.0	~~152.5~~	12	260.0
19	Yurik Sarkisyan (AUS)	C	61.78	115.0	~~120.0~~	~~120.0~~	23	~~145.0~~	145.0	—	19	260.0
20	Hassan Al-Sadah (KSA)	C	61.30	~~110.0~~	~~115.0~~	115.0	20	140.0	~~150.0~~	~~150.0~~	21	255.0
21	Elkhan Suleymanov (AZE)	D	61.78	110.0	~~117.5~~	117.5	19	135.0	~~147.5~~	~~147.5~~	25	252.5
22	Zbyněk Dub (CZE)	D	61.17	110.0	~~115.0~~	~~115.0~~	25	140.0	~~145.0~~	~~145.0~~	20	250.0
23	Laurent Pedreno (FRA)	D	61.63	115.0	~~120.0~~	~~120.0~~	21	132.5	~~137.5~~	~~137.5~~	27	247.5
24	Kamran Panjavi (GBR)	D	61.77	110.0	~~115.0~~	~~115.0~~	27	132.5	~~137.5~~	137.5	23	247.5
25	Juan Carlos Reyes (ESA)	D	61.10	~~110.0~~	110.0	~~115.0~~	24	130.0	~~135.0~~	135.0	24	245.0
26	Chiu Yi-lieh (TPE)	D	61.43	~~105.0~~	~~105.0~~	105.0	28	130.0	137.5	~~142.5~~	22	242.5
27	Iván García (ESP)	C	61.46	100.0	105.0	~~110.0~~	29	127.5	132.5	~~135.0~~	26	237.5
—	Teguh Priyono (INA)	B	61.47	~~122.5~~	~~122.5~~	~~122.5~~	—	—	—	—	—	—
—	Israel José Rubio (VEN)	C	61.61	~~125.0~~	125.0	~~130.0~~	13	~~147.5~~	~~147.5~~	~~150.0~~	—	—
—	Mohamed Osman (EGY)	B	61.62	122.5	~~127.5~~	~~127.5~~	14	~~152.5~~	~~152.5~~	~~152.5~~	—	—
—	Im Yong-su (PRK)	A	61.65	~~135.0~~	~~135.0~~	~~135.0~~	—	~~170.0~~	~~170.0~~	~~170.0~~	—	—
—	Atef Jarray (TUN)	A	61.71	~~135.0~~	~~135.0~~	~~135.0~~	—	—	—	—	—	—
DQ	Vladimir Popov (MDA)	B	61.60	130.0	132.5	~~135.0~~	—	~~157.5~~	157.5	162.5	—	—
DQ	Khalid Abdul-Zahra (IRQ)	C	61.89	115.0	~~120.0~~	~~122.5~~	—	~~135.0~~	135.0	~~140.0~~	—	—
DQ	Henadzi Aliashchuk (BLR)	A	61.94	137.5	142.5	~~145.0~~	—	170.0	175.0	~~183.0~~	—	—
DQ	Swara Mohammed (IRQ)	C	60.56	~~110.0~~	~~110.0~~	~~110.0~~	—	140.0	~~145.0~~	~~145.0~~	—	—
