= Weightlifting at the 2006 Asian Games – Men's 62 kg =

Men's 62 kg at the 2006 Asian Games
- Venue: Al-Dana Banquet Hall
- Date: 3 December 2006
- Competitors: 15 from 12 nations

Medalists
gold medal	Qiu Le	China
silver medal	Mao Jiao	China
bronze medal	Im Yong-su	North Korea

The men's 62 kilograms event at the 2006 Asian Games took place on December 3, 2006 at Al-Dana Banquet Hall in Doha.

== Schedule ==
All times are Arabia Standard Time (UTC+03:00)

Date	Time	Event
Sunday, 3 December 2006	09:00	Group B
Sunday, 3 December 2006	16:00	Group A

== Records ==
Prior to this competition, the existing world, Asian and Games records were as follows.

World Record	Snatch	Shi Zhiyong (CHN)	153 kg	İzmir, Turkey	28 June 2002
World Record	Clean & Jerk	Le Maosheng (CHN)	182 kg	Busan, South Korea	2 October 2002
World Record	Total	World Standard	325 kg	—	1 January 1998
Asian Record	Snatch	Shi Zhiyong (CHN)	153 kg	İzmir, Turkey	28 June 2002
Asian Record	Clean & Jerk	Le Maosheng (CHN)	182 kg	Busan, South Korea	2 October 2002
Asian Record	Total	Shi Zhiyong (CHN)	325 kg	Athens, Greece	16 August 2004
Games Record	Snatch	Le Maosheng (CHN)	140 kg	Bangkok, Thailand	8 December 1998
Games Record	Clean & Jerk	Le Maosheng (CHN)	182 kg	Busan, South Korea	2 October 2002
Games Record	Total	Le Maosheng (CHN)	322 kg	Busan, South Korea	2 October 2002

== Results ==
Legend

- NM — No mark

Rank	Athlete	Group	Body weight	Snatch (kg)				Clean & Jerk (kg)				Total
Rank	Athlete	Group	Body weight	1	2	3	Result	1	2	3	Result	Total
1st place, gold medalist(s)	Qiu Le (CHN)	A	61.37	136	140	142	142	168	173	175	175	317
2nd place, silver medalist(s)	Mao Jiao (CHN)	A	61.27	136	~~140~~	140	140	~~168~~	168	175	175	315
3rd place, bronze medalist(s)	Im Yong-su (PRK)	A	61.98	135	~~140~~	~~140~~	135	165	~~170~~	~~170~~	165	300
4	Triyatno (INA)	A	61.79	125	130	~~133~~	130	150	157	161	161	291
5	Yang Sheng-hsiung (TPE)	A	61.64	125	130	~~132~~	130	160	~~165~~	~~165~~	160	290
6	Kim Kum-sok (PRK)	A	61.84	130	~~135~~	~~135~~	130	~~160~~	160	~~165~~	160	290
7	Ali Al-Dhilab (KSA)	A	61.84	127	~~130~~	131	131	~~155~~	155	~~158~~	155	286
8	Niwat Kritphet (THA)	A	61.51	~~125~~	125	~~131~~	125	155	~~160~~	160	160	285
9	Ümürbek Bazarbaýew (TKM)	A	61.48	125	~~130~~	~~130~~	125	~~150~~	150	~~155~~	150	275
10	Nguyễn Mạnh Thắng (VIE)	B	61.56	~~125~~	~~125~~	125	125	~~150~~	150	~~155~~	150	275
11	Roswadi Abdul Rashid (MAS)	B	61.94	~~115~~	115	~~121~~	115	135	~~140~~	~~140~~	135	250
12	Mustafa Ramo (SYR)	B	59.31	~~98~~	~~98~~	98	98	127	132	136	136	234
13	Mario Araújo (TLS)	B	60.73	55	~~60~~	~~60~~	55	70	~~75~~	75	75	130
—	Tolkunbek Hudaýbergenow (TKM)	A	61.47	~~120~~	~~120~~	~~120~~	—	—	—	—	—	NM
—	Ji Hun-min (KOR)	A	61.64	128	~~133~~	~~133~~	128	~~157~~	—	—	—	NM

== New records ==
The following records were established during the competition.

Snatch	142	Qiu Le (CHN)	GR
