= 2005 World Weightlifting Championships – Men's 62 kg =

The 2005 World Weightlifting Championships were held in Doha, Qatar from 9 November to 17 November. The men's 62 kilograms division was staged on 10 November 2005.

== Schedule ==
Date	Time	Event
10 November 2005	15:00	Group B
10 November 2005	20:00	Group A

== Medalists ==
Event	Gold		Silver		Bronze	
Snatch	Zhang Ping (CHN)	145 kg	Qiu Le (CHN)	144 kg	Adrian Jigău (ROM)	133 kg
Clean & Jerk	Qiu Le (CHN)	178 kg	Zhang Ping (CHN)	170 kg	Adán Rosales (CUB)	166 kg
Total	Qiu Le (CHN)	322 kg	Zhang Ping (CHN)	315 kg	Adrian Jigău (ROM)	292 kg

== Records ==
Prior to this competition, the existing world records were as follows.

World Record	Snatch	Shi Zhiyong (CHN)	153 kg	İzmir, Turkey	28 June 2002
World Record	Clean & Jerk	Le Maosheng (CHN)	182 kg	Busan, South Korea	2 October 2002
World Record	Total	World Standard	325 kg	—	1 January 1998

== Results ==
Rank	Athlete	Group	Body weight	Snatch (kg)				Clean & Jerk (kg)				Total
Rank	Athlete	Group	Body weight	1	2	3	Rank	1	2	3	Rank	Total
1st place, gold medalist(s)	Qiu Le (CHN)	A	61.14	135	141	144	2nd place, silver medalist(s)	166	171	178	1st place, gold medalist(s)	322
2nd place, silver medalist(s)	Zhang Ping (CHN)	A	61.82	135	142	145	1st place, gold medalist(s)	166	170	~~173~~	2nd place, silver medalist(s)	315
3rd place, bronze medalist(s)	Adrian Jigău (ROM)	A	61.93	127	131	133	3rd place, bronze medalist(s)	156	159	~~162~~	6	292
4	Sevdalin Minchev (BUL)	A	61.94	~~125~~	125	~~131~~	6	155	162	~~168~~	4	287
5	Yang Sheng-hsiung (TPE)	A	61.29	123	~~126~~	126	5	155	160	~~166~~	5	286
6	Ümürbek Bazarbaýew (TKM)	A	61.36	130	~~133~~	~~133~~	4	150	156	~~162~~	8	286
7	Manuel Minginfel (FSM)	A	61.32	115	120	123	8	150	157	~~162~~	7	280
8	Tom Goegebuer (BEL)	A	61.02	118	123	~~126~~	7	145	149	~~153~~	10	272
9	Tolkunbek Hudaýbergenow (TKM)	B	61.23	115	121	~~125~~	9	145	151	—	9	272
10	Sébastien Groulx (CAN)	B	61.92	112	~~116~~	~~116~~	11	142	145	~~151~~	11	257
11	Ioan Veliciu (ROM)	B	61.80	112	116	~~120~~	10	130	140	~~143~~	12	256
12	Charles Andriantsiry (MAD)	B	61.90	90	95	100	13	~~135~~	135	140	13	240
13	Nizom Sangov (TJK)	B	61.80	100	105	~~107~~	12	115	118	~~122~~	16	223
14	Ismail Katamba (UGA)	B	60.57	90	~~95~~	~~95~~	14	120	~~130~~	~~131~~	15	210
—	Adán Rosales (CUB)	A	61.69	~~125~~	~~125~~	~~125~~	—	166	~~169~~	~~171~~	3rd place, bronze medalist(s)	—
—	Hamidul Islam (BAN)	B	61.96	~~110~~	~~110~~	~~110~~	—	~~138~~	~~138~~	138	14	—
—	Manuel Martín (ESP)	B	61.98	~~115~~	~~115~~	~~115~~	—	—	—	—	—	—
DQ	Salah Mohammed Al-Yazidi (QAT)	B	58.81	70	75	~~80~~	—	90	95	~~97~~	—	—
