= Weightlifting at the 2012 Summer Olympics – Men's 69 kg =

Men's 69 kg at the Games of the XXX Olympiad
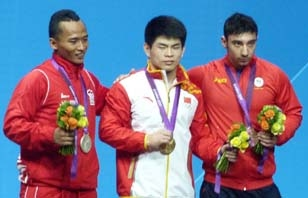
- Left-right: Triyatno, Lin and Martin
- Venue: ExCeL London
- Date: 31 July 2012
- Competitors: 24 from 18 nations

Medalists
1st place, gold medalist(s)		Lin Qingfeng	China
2nd place, silver medalist(s)		Triyatno	Indonesia
3rd place, bronze medalist(s)		Kim Myong-hyok	North Korea

The Men's 69 kilograms weightlifting event at the 2012 Summer Olympics in London, United Kingdom, took place at ExCeL London on 31 July 2012.

== Summary ==
Total score was the sum of the lifter's best result in each of the snatch and the clean and jerk, with three lifts allowed for each lift. In case of a tie, the lighter lifter won; if still tied, the lifter who took the fewest attempts to achieve the total score won. Lifters without a valid snatch score did not perform the clean and jerk.

On 25 November 2020 Răzvan Martin of Romania, who had originally been the bronze medalist, was disqualified after a retest of his sample tested positive for doping.

== Schedule ==
All times are British Summer Time (UTC+01:00)

Date	Time	Event
31 July 2012	10:00	Group B
31 July 2012	19:00	Group A

== Records ==
{{{caption}}}
World Record	Snatch	Georgi Markov (BUL)	165 kg	Sydney, Australia	20 September 2000
World Record	Clean & Jerk	Zhang Guozheng (CHN)	197 kg	Qinhuangdao, China	11 September 2003
World Record	Total	Galabin Boevski (BUL)	357 kg	Athens, Greece	24 November 1999
Olympic Record	Snatch	Georgi Markov (BUL)	165 kg	Sydney, Australia	20 September 2000
Olympic Record	Clean & Jerk	Galabin Boevski (BUL)	196 kg	Sydney, Australia	20 September 2000
Olympic Record	Total	Galabin Boevski (BUL)	357 kg	Sydney, Australia	20 September 2000

== Results ==
Rank	Athlete	Group	Body weight	Snatch (kg)				Clean & Jerk (kg)				Total
Rank	Athlete	Group	Body weight	1	2	3	Result	1	2	3	Result	Total
1st place, gold medalist(s)	Lin Qingfeng (CHN)	A	67.79	152	155	157	157	182	187	~~198~~	187	344
2nd place, silver medalist(s)	Triyatno (INA)	A	68.88	145	~~150~~	~~150~~	145	181	186	188	188	333
3rd place, bronze medalist(s)	Kim Myong-hyok (PRK)	B	68.78	140	~~145~~	145	145	177	184	~~187~~	184	329
4	Junior Sánchez (VEN)	B	68.67	145	~~148~~	148	148	172	176	180	180	328
5	Won Jeong-sik (KOR)	A	68.73	144	~~147~~	~~147~~	144	178	~~186~~	~~187~~	178	322
6	Briken Calja (ALB)	A	68.96	143	~~146~~	~~146~~	143	173	174	177	177	320
7	Mohamed Abdelbaki (EGY)	A	68.97	141	~~145~~	145	145	171	~~176~~	~~176~~	171	316
8	Kim Kum-sok (PRK)	A	68.61	~~140~~	140	~~145~~	140	175	~~181~~	~~181~~	175	315
9	Deni (INA)	A	67.63	~~140~~	140	~~145~~	140	~~170~~	171	~~177~~	171	311
10	Daniýar Ysmaýylow (TKM)	B	68.06	140	145	~~150~~	145	160	165	~~170~~	165	310
11	Doyler Sánchez (COL)	B	68.11	135	138	~~140~~	138	~~170~~	170	~~174~~	170	308
12	Ravi Kumar Katulu (IND)	B	68.67	136	~~141~~	~~141~~	136	167	~~176~~	~~176~~	167	303
13	Atthaphon Daengchanthuek (THA)	B	68.83	130	~~135~~	~~135~~	130	165	~~170~~	170	170	300
14	Gareth Evans (GBR)	B	68.31	125	130	~~133~~	130	153	158	~~160~~	158	288
—	Arakel Mirzoyan (ARM)	A	68.73	~~148~~	148	~~151~~	148	~~177~~	~~177~~	~~181~~	—	—
—	Daniel Godelli (ALB)	A	68.49	~~142~~	~~145~~	~~145~~	—	—	—	—	—	—
—	Afgan Bayramov (AZE)	A	68.54	~~142~~	~~142~~	~~142~~	—	—	—	—	—	—
—	Bakhram Mendibaev (UZB)	B	68.69	~~135~~	~~135~~	~~135~~	—	—	—	—	—	—
—	Vencelas Dabaya (FRA)	A	68.66	~~135~~	~~135~~	~~135~~	—	—	—	—	—	—
—	Bernardin Matam (FRA)	A	68.32	~~143~~	~~143~~	~~144~~	—	—	—	—	—	—
DQ	Răzvan Martin (ROU)	A	68.61	149	~~152~~	152	152	177	180	~~182~~	180	~~332~~
DQ	Mete Binay (TUR)	A	68.70	~~150~~	150	~~153~~	150	175	~~180~~	~~180~~	175	~~325~~
DQ	Sardar Hasanov (AZE)	B	68.77	138	145	~~150~~	145	167	176	~~181~~	176	~~321~~
DQ	Bünyamin Sezer (TUR)	B	66.95	120	125	130	130	135	145	~~153~~	145	~~275~~
