= 2009 World Weightlifting Championships – Men's 69 kg =

The men's competition in the lightweight (– 69 kg) division was staged on November 22, 2009.

== Schedule ==
Date	Time	Event
22 November 2009	09:00	Group C
22 November 2009	13:00	Group B
22 November 2009	19:00	Group A

== Medalists ==
Event	Gold		Silver		Bronze	
Snatch	Liao Hui (CHN)	160 kg	Ninel Miculescu (ROU)	155 kg	Arakel Mirzoyan (ARM)	154 kg
Clean & Jerk	Liao Hui (CHN)	186 kg	Kim Sun-bae (KOR)	181 kg	Triyatno (INA)	180 kg
Total	Liao Hui (CHN)	346 kg	Arakel Mirzoyan (ARM)	334 kg	Triyatno (INA)	330 kg

== Records ==
Prior to this competition, the existing world records were as follows.

World Record	Snatch	Georgi Markov (BUL)	165 kg	Sydney, Australia	20 September 2000
World Record	Clean & Jerk	Zhang Guozheng (CHN)	197 kg	Qinhuangdao, China	11 September 2003
World Record	Total	Galabin Boevski (BUL)	357 kg	Athens, Greece	24 November 1999

== Results ==
Rank	Athlete	Group	Body weight	Snatch (kg)				Clean & Jerk (kg)				Total
Rank	Athlete	Group	Body weight	1	2	3	Rank	1	2	3	Rank	Total
1st place, gold medalist(s)	Liao Hui (CHN)	A	68.92	155	160	~~166~~	1st place, gold medalist(s)	~~186~~	186	—	1st place, gold medalist(s)	346
2nd place, silver medalist(s)	Arakel Mirzoyan (ARM)	A	68.61	150	~~154~~	154	3rd place, bronze medalist(s)	180	~~184~~	~~184~~	4	334
3rd place, bronze medalist(s)	Triyatno (INA)	A	68.16	140	145	150	4	180	~~185~~	~~185~~	3rd place, bronze medalist(s)	330
4	Ninel Miculescu (ROU)	A	68.54	148	151	155	2nd place, silver medalist(s)	173	~~178~~	~~180~~	6	328
5	Kim Sun-bae (KOR)	A	68.60	135	140	142	7	175	181	~~185~~	2nd place, silver medalist(s)	323
6	Bredni Roque (CUB)	B	68.48	134	140	143	6	169	~~175~~	175	5	318
7	Mohamed Abdelbaki (EGY)	A	68.41	141	~~144~~	~~144~~	8	~~170~~	172	~~177~~	8	313
8	Bakhram Mendibaev (UZB)	A	68.88	~~140~~	140	~~144~~	10	~~170~~	~~172~~	173	7	313
9	Israel José Rubio (VEN)	B	68.68	136	~~141~~	141	9	165	~~170~~	~~170~~	10	306
10	Afgan Bayramov (AZE)	A	68.27	~~135~~	135	~~140~~	11	170	~~175~~	~~175~~	9	305
11	Isaac Morillas (ESP)	B	68.88	128	~~133~~	~~133~~	13	152	160	~~169~~	12	288
12	Henry Brower (USA)	B	68.68	124	127	~~130~~	14	155	~~160~~	160	11	287
13	Francis Luna-Grenier (CAN)	C	68.77	~~122~~	122	130	12	~~157~~	157	~~165~~	14	287
14	Mark Spooner (NZL)	B	68.72	124	~~127~~	~~127~~	18	~~152~~	152	156	15	280
15	François Etoundi (AUS)	B	68.77	125	~~129~~	~~129~~	17	~~152~~	152	—	17	277
16	Roger Couoh (MEX)	C	68.99	~~118~~	118	~~122~~	21	158	~~161~~	~~161~~	13	276
17	Ali Mohammed (IRQ)	C	67.78	116	120	~~125~~	20	150	~~155~~	155	16	275
18	Caleb Williams (USA)	C	68.76	120	~~124~~	124	19	~~151~~	151	~~157~~	18	275
19	Kambar Toktonaliev (KGZ)	C	68.93	115	~~120~~	~~120~~	23	145	~~150~~	~~150~~	19	260
20	Juan Peña (DOM)	C	67.75	105	110	115	22	135	142	~~150~~	20	257
21	Seth Fetrie (GHA)	C	68.37	95	100	~~102~~	25	137	~~140~~	~~140~~	21	238
—	Vencelas Dabaya (FRA)	A	68.58	146	149	~~152~~	5	~~185~~	~~185~~	~~185~~	—	—
—	Jean-Baptiste Yanou (CMR)	C	68.58	117	121	125	15	~~153~~	~~153~~	~~153~~	—	—
—	Manuel Martín (ESP)	B	68.60	~~125~~	125	~~131~~	16	~~160~~	~~160~~	—	—	—
—	Nii Darku Dodoo (GHA)	C	66.60	100	~~105~~	~~105~~	24	~~140~~	~~140~~	~~140~~	—	—
—	Chinthana Vidanage (SRI)	B	68.43	~~127~~	~~127~~	—	—	—	—	—	—	—
—	Alexandru Dudoglo (MDA)	B	68.66	—	—	—	—	—	—	—	—	—
