= 2001 World Weightlifting Championships – Men's 62 kg =

The 2001 World Weightlifting Championships – Men's 62 kg (men's featherweight) were held in Antalya, Turkey on 5 November.

== Medalists ==
Event	Gold		Silver		Bronze	
Snatch	Li Yinglong (CHN)	142.5 kg	Nikolaj Pešalov (CRO)	137.5 kg	Henadzi Aliashchuk (BLR)	137.5 kg
Clean & Jerk	Henadzi Aliashchuk (BLR)	180.0 kg	Vladimir Rodríguez (CUB)	167.5 kg	Stefan Georgiev (BUL)	167.5 kg
Total	Henadzi Aliashchuk (BLR)	317.5 kg	Li Yinglong (CHN)	305.0 kg	Stefan Georgiev (BUL)	302.5 kg

== Records ==
Prior to this competition, the existing world records were as follows.

World Record	Snatch	Shi Zhiyong (CHN)	152.5 kg	Osaka, Japan	3 May 2000
World Record	Clean & Jerk	Le Maosheng (CHN)	180.5 kg	Athens, Greece	23 November 1999
World Record	Total	World Standard	325.0 kg	—	1 January 1998

== Results ==
Rank	Athlete	Body weight	Snatch (kg)				Clean & Jerk (kg)				Total
Rank	Athlete	Body weight	1	2	3	Rank	1	2	3	Rank	Total
1st place, gold medalist(s)	Henadzi Aliashchuk (BLR)	61.78	137.5	~~142.5~~	~~142.5~~	3rd place, bronze medalist(s)	170.0	172.5	181.0	1st place, gold medalist(s)	317.5
2nd place, silver medalist(s)	Li Yinglong (CHN)	61.70	132.5	137.5	142.5	1st place, gold medalist(s)	152.5	157.5	162.5	6	305.0
3rd place, bronze medalist(s)	Stefan Georgiev (BUL)	61.94	130.0	135.0	~~137.5~~	7	167.5	~~172.5~~	~~172.5~~	3rd place, bronze medalist(s)	302.5
4	Mücahit Yağcı (TUR)	61.46	127.5	132.5	135.0	4	160.0	~~165.0~~	165.0	4	300.0
5	Vladimir Rodríguez (CUB)	61.46	127.5	~~132.5~~	~~132.5~~	9	162.5	~~167.5~~	167.5	2nd place, silver medalist(s)	295.0
6	Chen Lu (CHN)	61.76	~~132.5~~	132.5	135.0	5	155.0	160.0	~~165.0~~	7	295.0
7	Vladislav Lukanin (RUS)	61.82	130.0	135.0	~~137.5~~	6	160.0	~~165.0~~	~~165.0~~	9	295.0
8	Yurik Sarkisyan (AUS)	61.68	125.0	127.5	~~130.0~~	10	162.5	165.0	~~170.0~~	5	292.5
9	Oleksandr Likhvald (UKR)	61.82	130.0	~~135.0~~	~~135.0~~	8	160.0	~~165.0~~	~~165.0~~	8	290.0
10	Elkhan Suleymanov (AZE)	61.76	~~125.0~~	125.0	~~130.0~~	12	155.0	~~160.0~~	~~160.0~~	10	280.0
11	Tom Goegebuer (BEL)	61.18	117.5	122.5	125.0	11	142.5	~~147.5~~	~~147.5~~	11	267.5
12	Jasvir Singh (IND)	61.74	110.0	115.0	~~117.5~~	13	135.0	~~142.5~~	142.5	12	257.5
13	Matvei Dalakian (ISR)	61.28	100.0	~~105.0~~	~~105.0~~	14	120.0	—	—	13	220.0
—	Nikolaj Pešalov (CRO)	61.54	~~137.5~~	137.5	~~142.5~~	2nd place, silver medalist(s)	—	—	—	—	—

== New records ==
Clean & Jerk	181.0 kg	Henadzi Aliashchuk (BLR)	WR
