= Weightlifting at the 2006 Commonwealth Games – Men's 62 kg =

Weightlifting – Men's 62 kg at the 2006 Commonwealth Games
- Venue: Melbourne Exhibition Centre
- Dates: 17 March 2006
- Competitors: 20 from 17 nations
- Winning total weight: 271

Medalists
gold medal	Chinthana Vidanage	Sri Lanka
silver medal	Arun Murugesan	India
bronze medal	Roswadi Abdul Rashid	Malaysia

The Men's 62 kg weightlifting event at the 2006 Commonwealth Games took place at the Melbourne Exhibition Centre on 17 March 2006. The weightlifter from Sri Lanka won the gold, lifting a total weight of 271 kg.

== Schedule ==
All times are Australian Eastern Standard Time (UTC+10)

Date	Time	Event
17 March 2006	10:00	Group B
17 March 2006	14:00	Group A

== Records ==
Prior to this competition, the existing world, Commonwealth and Games records were as follows:

World record	Snatch	Shi Zhiyong (CHN)	153 kg	İzmir, Turkey	28 June 2002
World record	Clean & Jerk	Le Maosheng (CHN)	182 kg	Busan, South Korea	2 October 2002
World record	Total	World Standard	325 kg	–	1 January 1998
Commonwealth record	Snatch	Yurik Sarkisyan (AUS)	127 kg	Lahti, Finland	9 November 1998
Commonwealth record	Clean & Jerk	Marcus Stephen (NRU)	172 kg	Athens, Greece	23 November 1999
Commonwealth record	Total	Marcus Stephen (NRU)	300 kg	Athens, Greece	23 November 1999
Games record	Snatch	Yurik Sarkisyan (AUS)	125 kg	Kuala Lumpur, Malaysia	16 September 1998
Games record	Clean & Jerk	Marcus Stephen (NRU)	167 kg	Kuala Lumpur, Malaysia	16 September 1998
Games record	Total	Marcus Stephen (NRU)	292 kg	Kuala Lumpur, Malaysia	16 September 1998

== Results ==
Rank	Athlete	Nation	Group	Body weight	Snatch (kg)				Clean & Jerk (kg)				Total
Rank	Athlete	Nation	Group	Body weight	1	2	3	Result	1	2	3	Result	Total
1st place, gold medalist(s)	Chinthana Vidanage	Sri Lanka	A	61.79	~~118~~	~~118~~	118	118	145	~~150~~	153	153	271
2nd place, silver medalist(s)	Arun Murugesan	India	A	61.87	115	119	121	121	~~145~~	145	150	150	271
3rd place, bronze medalist(s)	Roswadi Abdul Rashid	Malaysia	A	61.70	117	120	~~122~~	120	137	141	~~146~~	141	261
4	Muhammad Ishtiaq Ghafoor	Pakistan	A	61.65	~~112~~	113	~~116~~	113	140	145	~~148~~	145	258
5	Naharudin Mahayudin	Malaysia	B	61.49	116	~~120~~	~~120~~	116	141	~~146~~	~~146~~	146	257
6	Hamidul Islam	Bangladesh	A	61.94	110	~~116~~	~~116~~	110	137	~~146~~	146	146	256
7	Bernardin Matam	Cameroon	A	61.70	110	~~116~~	~~116~~	110	138	145	~~150~~	145	255
8	Yurik Sarkisyan	Australia	A	61.78	~~113~~	~~113~~	113	113	142	~~149~~	~~149~~	142	255
9	Sébastien Groulx	Canada	A	61.74	112	~~116~~	~~116~~	112	141	~~146~~	~~150~~	141	253
10	Greg Shushu	South Africa	A	61.59	~~107~~	~~107~~	107	107	~~135~~	135	~~140~~	135	242
11	Dimitris Minasidis	Cyprus	B	61.68	103	107	112	112	125	130	~~138~~	130	242
12	Sudesh Peiris	Sri Lanka	A	61.69	105	~~112~~	~~115~~	105	~~130~~	~~130~~	130	130	235
13	Musa Kamara	Sierra Leone	B	61.99	95	~~100~~	~~100~~	95	125	~~127~~	127	127	222
14	Makhosi Shabalala	Swaziland	B	61.82	90	~~95~~	95	95	~~125~~	~~125~~	125	125	220
15	Ika Aliklik	Nauru	B	61.87	~~91~~	91	~~96~~	91	120	~~125~~	125	125	216
16	Moses Kimbowa	Uganda	B	58.87	90	95	96	96	110	115	~~118~~	115	211
17	Tekaei Temake	Kiribati	B	61.42	~~91~~	91	~~95~~	91	117	~~125~~	~~126~~	117	208
18	Tsepo Matsoso	Lesotho	B	60.89	~~60~~	65	~~70~~	65	~~80~~	80	~~85~~	80	145
–	Kamran Panjavi	England	A	61.94	118	~~121~~	~~122~~	118	~~131~~	~~131~~	~~131~~	–	–
–	Constantine Vasiliades	Cyprus	B	60.82	~~97~~	~~97~~	~~97~~	–	–	–	–	–	–
