= 2001 European Weightlifting Championships =

International weightlifting competition

2001 European Championships

The 2001 European Weightlifting Championships were held in Trenčín, Slovakia. It was the 80th edition of the event.

== Medal overview ==
=== Men ===
Event	Gold	Silver	Bronze
– 56 kg	(Turkey) Halil Mutlu	(Romania) Adrian Jigau	(Belarus) Vitaly Derbenev
– 62 kg	(Croatia) Nikolaj Pešalov	(Azerbaijan) Elkhan Suleymanov	(Moldova) Vladimir Popov
– 69 kg	(Turkey) Ekrem Celil	(Russia) Andrey Matveev	(Azerbaijan) Turan Mirzayev
– 77 kg	(Russia) Oleg Perepetchenov	(Armenia) Hovannes Amreyan	(Hungary) Attila Feri
– 85 kg	(Georgia (country)) Giorgi Asanidze	(Bulgaria) Georgi Gardev	(Russia) Sergey Zhukov
– 94 kg	(Azerbaijan) Nizami Pashayev	(Bulgaria) Nikola Stoyanov	(Armenia) Hakob Pilosyan
– 105 kg	(Russia) Evgeny Chigishev	(Poland) Szymon Kolecki	(Hungary) Zoltán Kovács
+ 105 kg	(Latvia) Viktors Ščerbatihs	(Poland) Paweł Najdek	(Poland) Grzegorz Kleszcz

=== Women ===
Event	Gold	Silver	Bronze
– 48 kg	(Spain) Gema Peris	(Russia) Snezhana Popova	(Spain) Maria Jose Tocino
– 53 kg	(Turkey) Emine Bilgin	(Slovakia) Dagmar Danekova	(Spain) Estefania Juan
– 58 kg	(Poland) Aleksandra Klejnowska	(Poland) Marieta Gotfryd	(Turkey) Dondu Ay
– 63 kg	(Russia) Valentina Popova	(Poland) Dominika Misterska	(Ukraine) Nataliya Skakun
– 69 kg	(Ukraine) Vanda Maslovska	(Bulgaria) Milena Trendafilova	(Greece) Kleanthi Milona
– 75 kg	(Hungary) Gyöngyi Likerecz	(Hungary) Ilona Dankó	(Finland) Karoliina Lundahl
+ 75 kg	(Russia) Albina Khomich	(Hungary) Viktória Varga	(Ukraine) Viktoriya Shaimardanova
