= 2002 World Weightlifting Championships – Men's 62 kg =

The 2002 World Weightlifting Championships were held in Warsaw, Poland from 19 November to 26 November. The men's 62 kilograms division was staged on 20 November 2002.

== Schedule ==
Date	Time	Event
20 November 2002	10:00	Group B
20 November 2002	17:00	Group A

== Medalists ==
Event	Gold		Silver		Bronze	
Snatch	Le Maosheng (CHN)	140.0 kg	Leonidas Sabanis (GRE)	140.0 kg	Im Yong-su (PRK)	140.0 kg
Clean & Jerk	Im Yong-su (PRK)	175.0 kg	Stefan Georgiev (BUL)	172.5 kg	Le Maosheng (CHN)	170.0 kg
Total	Im Yong-su (PRK)	315.0 kg	Le Maosheng (CHN)	310.0 kg	Stefan Georgiev (BUL)	310.0 kg

== Records ==
Prior to this competition, the existing world records were as follows.

World Record	Snatch	Shi Zhiyong (CHN)	153.0 kg	İzmir, Turkey	28 June 2002
World Record	Clean & Jerk	Le Maosheng (CHN)	182.5 kg	Busan, South Korea	2 October 2002
World Record	Total	World Standard	325.0 kg	—	1 January 1998

== Results ==
Rank	Athlete	Group	Body weight	Snatch (kg)				Clean & Jerk (kg)				Total
Rank	Athlete	Group	Body weight	1	2	3	Rank	1	2	3	Rank	Total
1st place, gold medalist(s)	Im Yong-su (PRK)	A	61.75	~~135.0~~	135.0	140.0	3rd place, bronze medalist(s)	170.0	175.0	~~177.5~~	1st place, gold medalist(s)	315.0
2nd place, silver medalist(s)	Le Maosheng (CHN)	A	61.50	140.0	~~142.5~~	~~142.5~~	1st place, gold medalist(s)	170.0	~~175.0~~	~~175.0~~	3rd place, bronze medalist(s)	310.0
3rd place, bronze medalist(s)	Stefan Georgiev (BUL)	A	62.00	132.5	~~137.5~~	137.5	4	172.5	~~175.0~~	~~175.0~~	2nd place, silver medalist(s)	310.0
4	Leonidas Sabanis (GRE)	A	61.60	~~140.0~~	140.0	~~142.5~~	2nd place, silver medalist(s)	160.0	167.5	~~170.0~~	4	307.5
5	Oleksandr Likhvald (UKR)	A	61.65	130.0	~~135.0~~	~~135.0~~	6	157.5	162.5	~~170.0~~	5	292.5
6	Diego Salazar (COL)	B	61.90	127.5	~~132.5~~	132.5	5	~~160.0~~	~~160.0~~	160.0	7	292.5
7	Artur Danielyan (ARM)	A	61.90	130.0	~~135.0~~	~~135.0~~	7	155.0	160.0	~~167.5~~	8	290.0
8	İsmail Atmaca (TUR)	A	61.75	~~125.0~~	125.0	~~130.0~~	11	150.0	~~160.0~~	160.0	6	285.0
9	Samson Matam (FRA)	A	61.80	122.5	~~122.5~~	127.5	12	152.5	157.5	~~165.0~~	9	280.0
10	Toshio Imamura (JPN)	B	61.50	~~120.0~~	120.0	125.0	10	152.5	~~157.5~~	~~157.5~~	10	277.5
11	Oleg Shin (KAZ)	B	61.55	~~125.0~~	125.0	127.5	9	145.0	150.0	~~152.5~~	11	277.5
12	Giuliano Cornetta (ITA)	B	61.95	~~110.0~~	110.0	117.5	13	140.0	~~147.5~~	~~147.5~~	12	257.5
13	Miloš Sušanj (CRO)	B	61.80	95.0	100.0	~~102.5~~	14	115.0	120.0	~~125.0~~	13	220.0
—	Su Feixiang (CHN)	A	61.80	~~140.0~~	~~140.0~~	~~145.0~~	—	~~170.0~~	~~170.0~~	~~170.0~~	—	—
—	Elkhan Suleymanov (AZE)	A	61.90	~~130.0~~	130.0	~~135.0~~	8	~~150.0~~	—	—	—	—
