= Weightlifting at the 2010 Asian Games – Men's 69 kg =

Men's 69 kg at the 2010 Asian Games
- Venue: Dongguan Arena
- Date: 15 November 2010
- Competitors: 16 from 14 nations

Medalists
gold medal	Kim Kum-sok	North Korea
silver medal	Morteza Rezaeian	Iran
bronze medal	Triyatno	Indonesia

The men's 69 kilograms event at the 2010 Asian Games took place on 15 November 2010 at Dongguan Arena.

== Schedule ==
All times are China Standard Time (UTC+08:00)

Date	Time	Event
Monday, 15 November 2010	12:30	Group B
Monday, 15 November 2010	16:30	Group A

== Records ==
Prior to this competition, the existing world, Asian and Games records were as follows.

World Record	Snatch	Georgi Markov (BUL)	165 kg	Sydney, Australia	20 September 2000
World Record	Clean & Jerk	Zhang Guozheng (CHN)	197 kg	Qinhuangdao, China	11 September 2003
World Record	Total	Galabin Boevski (BUL)	357 kg	Athens, Greece	24 November 1999
Asian Record	Snatch	Zhang Guozheng (CHN)	160 kg	Athens, Greece	18 August 2004
Asian Record	Clean & Jerk	Zhang Guozheng (CHN)	197 kg	Qinhuangdao, China	11 September 2003
Asian Record	Total	Zhang Guozheng (CHN)	352 kg	Qinhuangdao, China	11 September 2003
Games Record	Snatch	Wan Jianhui (CHN)	155 kg	Bangkok, Thailand	9 December 1998
Games Record	Clean & Jerk	Kim Hak-bong (KOR)	195 kg	Bangkok, Thailand	9 December 1998
Games Record	Total	Zhang Guozheng (CHN)	345 kg	Busan, South Korea	3 October 2002

== Results ==
Rank	Athlete	Group	Body weight	Snatch (kg)				Clean & Jerk (kg)				Total
Rank	Athlete	Group	Body weight	1	2	3	Result	1	2	3	Result	Total
1st place, gold medalist(s)	Kim Kum-sok (PRK)	A	68.22	~~140~~	140	143	143	175	181	~~182~~	181	324
2nd place, silver medalist(s)	Morteza Rezaeian (IRI)	A	68.53	143	147	~~150~~	147	~~173~~	173	177	177	324
3rd place, bronze medalist(s)	Triyatno (INA)	A	68.91	143	~~148~~	~~148~~	143	174	178	~~182~~	178	321
4	Mehdi Panzvan (IRI)	A	67.79	143	147	~~149~~	147	173	~~176~~	~~176~~	173	320
5	Ravi Kumar Katulu (IND)	A	68.79	~~140~~	~~140~~	141	141	170	~~180~~	~~180~~	170	311
6	Won Jeong-sik (KOR)	A	68.77	140	~~145~~	~~145~~	140	170	~~181~~	~~181~~	170	310
7	Bakhram Mendibaev (UZB)	A	68.46	~~133~~	~~133~~	136	136	165	170	~~175~~	170	306
8	Muhammad Begaliev (UZB)	A	68.81	136	~~139~~	~~141~~	136	~~165~~	165	170	170	306
9	Kyaw Moe Win (MYA)	B	67.62	130	~~135~~	135	135	~~160~~	160	165	165	300
10	Tolkunbek Hudaýbergenow (TKM)	B	67.96	125	~~131~~	~~131~~	125	161	~~166~~	166	166	291
11	Medet Jundubayev (KAZ)	B	68.31	125	~~130~~	130	130	153	~~156~~	156	156	286
12	Zamirbek Ashyrbaev (KGZ)	B	68.63	122	~~127~~	~~127~~	122	153	~~160~~	~~160~~	153	275
13	Mati-ur-Rehman (PAK)	B	68.98	~~120~~	120	~~124~~	120	147	150	152	152	272
14	Kamal Bahadur Adhikari (NEP)	B	68.71	110	115	118	118	145	152	~~155~~	152	270
15	Hamidul Islam (BAN)	B	68.94	110	115	~~117~~	115	~~145~~	145	148	148	263
16	Khurshed Turaev (TJK)	B	67.96	110	115	~~118~~	115	140	145	~~147~~	145	260
