= Weightlifting at the 2010 South American Games – Men's 69kg =

The Men's 69 kg event at the 2010 South American Games was held over March 27 at 16:00.

== Medalists ==
Gold	Silver	Bronze
Israel Rubio; Venezuela	Doiler Sanchez; Colombia	Enrique Valencia; Ecuador

== Results ==
Rank	Athlete	Bodyweight	Snatch			Clean & Jerk			Total
Rank	Athlete	Bodyweight	1	2	3	1	2	3	Total
1st place, gold medalist(s)	Israel Rubio (VEN)	68.30	137	140	~~142~~	167	171	~~174~~	311
2nd place, silver medalist(s)	Doiler Sanchez (COL)	67.34	~~135~~	135	~~139~~	165	~~172~~	~~176~~	300
3rd place, bronze medalist(s)	Enrique Valencia (ECU)	67.49	130	135	~~138~~	157	163	~~166~~	298
4	Welisson Silva (BRA)	68.91	~~128~~	~~131~~	131	~~155~~	155	~~162~~	286
5	Hugo Catalan (ARG)	67.10	~~125~~	125	~~130~~	155	~~161~~	~~161~~	280
6	Yetzhari Droguett (CHI)	68.49	110	115	~~118~~	145	153	~~155~~	268
