= 1998 World Weightlifting Championships – Men's 62 kg =

The 1998 World Weightlifting Championships were held in Lahti, Finland November 7–15, 1998. The men's competition in the featherweight (– 62 kg) division was staged on November 9, 1998.

== Medalists ==
Event	Gold		Silver		Bronze	
Snatch	Leonidas Sabanis (GRE)	147.5 kg	Nikolaj Pešalov (CRO)	145.0 kg	Sevdalin Minchev (BUL)	140.0 kg
Clean & Jerk	Leonidas Sabanis (GRE)	172.5 kg	Nikolaj Pešalov (CRO)	172.5 kg	Sevdalin Minchev (BUL)	170.0 kg
Total	Leonidas Sabanis (GRE)	320.0 kg	Nikolaj Pešalov (CRO)	317.5 kg	Sevdalin Minchev (BUL)	310.0 kg

== Records ==
Prior to this competition, the existing world records were as follows.

World Record	Snatch	World Standard	145.0 kg	—	1 January 1998
World Record	Clean & Jerk	World Standard	180.0 kg	—	1 January 1998
World Record	Total	World Standard	325.0 kg	—	1 January 1998

== Results ==
Rank	Athlete	Body weight	Snatch (kg)				Clean & Jerk (kg)				Total
Rank	Athlete	Body weight	1	2	3	Rank	1	2	3	Rank	Total
1st place, gold medalist(s)	Leonidas Sabanis (GRE)	61.76	140.0	145.0	147.5	1st place, gold medalist(s)	167.5	~~172.5~~	172.5	1st place, gold medalist(s)	320.0
2nd place, silver medalist(s)	Nikolaj Pešalov (CRO)	61.80	140.0	145.0	~~150.0~~	2nd place, silver medalist(s)	172.5	~~177.5~~	~~177.5~~	2nd place, silver medalist(s)	317.5
3rd place, bronze medalist(s)	Sevdalin Minchev (BUL)	61.32	132.5	137.5	140.0	3rd place, bronze medalist(s)	162.5	170.0	~~172.5~~	3rd place, bronze medalist(s)	310.0
4	Su Feixiang (CHN)	61.67	~~135.0~~	135.0	140.0	5	~~170.0~~	170.0	~~175.0~~	5	310.0
5	Le Maosheng (CHN)	61.48	137.5	~~142.5~~	~~142.5~~	6	~~170.0~~	170.0	~~177.5~~	4	307.5
6	Valentin Sarov (BUL)	61.57	~~135.0~~	135.0	140.0	4	162.5	~~172.5~~	~~172.5~~	7	302.5
7	Zoltán Farkas (HUN)	61.78	~~132.5~~	137.5	137.5	8	~~160.0~~	165.0	165.0	6	302.5
8	Vladimir Popov (MDA)	61.60	125.0	130.0	132.5	9	155.0	157.5	162.5	8	295.0
9	Hafız Süleymanoğlu (TUR)	61.63	137.5	~~142.5~~	~~142.5~~	7	157.5	~~165.0~~	~~165.0~~	12	295.0
10	Yurik Sarkisyan (AUS)	61.83	122.5	~~127.5~~	127.5	11	152.5	157.5	160.0	11	287.5
11	Marcus Stephen (NRU)	61.91	120.0	~~125.0~~	125.0	12	162.5	~~170.0~~	~~172.5~~	9	287.5
12	Oleg Shin (KAZ)	61.58	120.0	125.0	130.0	10	~~147.5~~	147.5	152.5	13	282.5
13	Roger Berrio (COL)	61.83	115.0	120.0	122.5	13	145.0	150.0	~~155.0~~	14	272.5
14	Alfonso Portillo (ESP)	61.53	110.0	~~115.0~~	115.0	15	140.0	145.0	~~150.0~~	15	260.0
15	Jyrki Welling (FIN)	61.76	107.5	112.5	115.0	16	137.5	~~142.5~~	142.5	18	257.5
16	Michael Garrido (FRA)	61.65	112.5	~~117.5~~	~~117.5~~	17	~~140.0~~	~~140.0~~	142.5	17	255.0
17	Tom Goegebuer (BEL)	60.98	~~110.0~~	~~110.0~~	110.0	18	~~137.5~~	137.5	142.5	16	252.5
18	Chen Po-pu (TPE)	61.32	~~110.0~~	110.0	~~115.0~~	19	~~140.0~~	140.0	~~145.0~~	19	250.0
19	Nuno Alves (POR)	61.10	102.5	107.5	~~110.0~~	20	130.0	~~135.0~~	~~135.0~~	20	237.5
20	Wayne Healy (IRE)	61.25	90.0	95.0	~~100.0~~	21	120.0	125.0	130.0	21	225.0
21	Badru Nyamuja (UGA)	61.60	95.0	~~100.0~~	~~100.0~~	22	125.0	~~130.0~~	130.0	22	225.0
—	Laurent Pedreno (FRA)	61.69	112.5	117.5	~~120.0~~	14	~~135.0~~	~~135.0~~	~~135.0~~	—	—
—	Mohamed Osman (EGY)	61.47	~~115.0~~	~~115.0~~	~~115.0~~	—	150.0	160.0	~~165.0~~	10	—
—	Jarkko Welling (FIN)	61.52	~~105.0~~	~~105.0~~	~~105.0~~	—	120.0	127.5	~~130.0~~	23	—

== New records ==
Snatch	147.5 kg	Leonidas Sabanis (GRE)	WR
