= Weightlifting at the 2004 Summer Olympics – Men's 62 kg =

Weightlifting at the Olympics

Men's 62 kg at the Games of the XXVIII Olympiad
- Venue: Nikaia Olympic Weightlifting Hall
- Date: 16 August 2004
- Competitors: 20 from 18 nations

Medalists
1st place, gold medalist(s)		Shi Zhiyong	China
2nd place, silver medalist(s)		Le Maosheng	China
3rd place, bronze medalist(s)		Israel José Rubio	Venezuela

The men's 62 kilograms weightlifting event at the 2004 Summer Olympics in Athens, Greece took place at the Nikaia Olympic Weightlifting Hall on 16 August.

Total score was the sum of the lifter's best result in each of the snatch and the clean and jerk, with three lifts allowed for each lift. In case of a tie, the lighter lifter won; if still tied, the lifter who took the fewest attempts to achieve the total score won. Lifters without a valid snatch score did not perform the clean and jerk.

== Schedule ==
All times are Eastern European Summer Time (UTC+03:00)

Date	Time	Event
16 August 2004	10:30	Group B
16 August 2004	20:00	Group A

== Records ==
{{{caption}}}
World Record	Snatch	Shi Zhiyong (CHN)	153.0 kg	İzmir, Turkey	28 June 2002
World Record	Clean & Jerk	Le Maosheng (CHN)	182.5 kg	Busan, South Korea	2 October 2002
World Record	Total	World Standard	325.0 kg	—	1 January 1998
Olympic Record	Snatch	Nikolaj Pešalov (CRO)	150.0 kg	Sydney, Australia	17 September 2000
Olympic Record	Clean & Jerk	Olympic Standard	177.5 kg	—	1 January 1997
Olympic Record	Total	Nikolaj Pešalov (CRO)	325.0 kg	Sydney, Australia	17 September 2000

== Results ==
Rank	Athlete	Group	Body weight	Snatch (kg)				Clean & Jerk (kg)				Total
Rank	Athlete	Group	Body weight	1	2	3	Result	1	2	3	Result	Total
1st place, gold medalist(s)	Shi Zhiyong (CHN)	A	61.96	147.5	~~152.5~~	152.5	152.5	167.5	172.5	~~175.0~~	172.5	325.0
2nd place, silver medalist(s)	Le Maosheng (CHN)	A	61.27	~~140.0~~	140.0	~~145.0~~	140.0	172.5	~~185.0~~	~~185.0~~	172.5	312.5
3rd place, bronze medalist(s)	Israel José Rubio (VEN)	B	61.38	127.5	132.5	~~135.0~~	132.5	157.5	162.5	~~165.0~~	162.5	295.0
4	Armen Ghazaryan (ARM)	A	61.90	130.0	~~135.0~~	135.0	135.0	160.0	~~170.0~~	~~170.0~~	160.0	295.0
5	Gustar Junianto (INA)	B	61.27	~~125.0~~	127.5	132.5	132.5	155.0	160.0	~~162.5~~	160.0	292.5
6	Samson Matam (FRA)	A	61.74	127.5	~~132.5~~	~~132.5~~	127.5	~~160.0~~	160.0	~~167.5~~	160.0	287.5
7	Ümürbek Bazarbaýew (TKM)	A	61.68	130.0	~~135.0~~	~~135.0~~	130.0	157.5	~~165.0~~	~~165.0~~	157.5	287.5
8	Sunarto Rasidi (INA)	B	61.78	125.0	~~130.0~~	~~130.0~~	125.0	155.0	160.0	~~162.5~~	160.0	285.0
9	Yang Sheng-hsiung (TPE)	B	61.78	115.0	~~120.0~~	120.0	120.0	155.0	160.0	~~165.0~~	160.0	280.0
10	Manuel Minginfel (FSM)	B	61.53	~~115.0~~	115.0	120.0	120.0	~~147.5~~	147.5	152.5	152.5	272.5
11	Toshio Imamura (JPN)	B	61.66	120.0	~~125.0~~	~~125.0~~	120.0	150.0	~~155.0~~	~~155.0~~	150.0	270.0
12	Asif Malikov (AZE)	B	61.60	~~115.0~~	115.0	~~120.0~~	115.0	145.0	150.0	~~155.0~~	150.0	265.0
13	Gert Trasha (ALB)	B	61.99	110.0	115.0	~~117.5~~	115.0	135.0	140.0	~~145.0~~	140.0	255.0
14	Ioan Veliciu (ROM)	B	61.64	105.0	110.0	~~112.5~~	110.0	130.0	~~135.0~~	135.0	135.0	245.0
15	Yacine Zouaki (MAR)	B	61.63	~~95.0~~	~~95.0~~	95.0	95.0	125.0	130.0	~~135.0~~	130.0	225.0
—	Kamran Panjavi (GBR)	B	61.75	~~105.0~~	~~105.0~~	—	—	—	—	—	—	—
—	Sevdalin Minchev (BUL)	A	61.56	137.5	~~142.5~~	~~142.5~~	137.5	~~170.0~~	~~170.0~~	~~170.0~~	—	—
—	Im Yong-su (PRK)	A	61.77	135.0	140.0	~~142.5~~	140.0	~~170.0~~	~~170.0~~	~~170.0~~	—	—
—	Diego Salazar (COL)	A	61.52	~~135.0~~	~~135.0~~	~~135.0~~	—	—	—	—	—	—
DQ	Leonidas Sabanis (GRE)	A	61.49	140.0	145.0	~~147.5~~	145.0	162.5	~~167.5~~	167.5	167.5	~~312.5~~

- Leonidas Sabanis of Greece originally won the bronze medal, but he was disqualified after he tested positive for excessive testosterone.

== New records ==
Snatch	152.5 kg	Shi Zhiyong (CHN)	OR
