= 1997 World Weightlifting Championships – Men's 59 kg =

The 1997 World Weightlifting Championships were held in Chiang Mai, Thailand from December 6 to December 14. The men's competition in the 59 kg division was staged on 7 December 1997.

== Medalists ==
Event	Gold		Silver		Bronze	
Snatch	William Vargas (CUB)	132.5 kg	Stefan Georgiev (BUL)	130.0 kg	Le Maosheng (CHN)	130.0 kg
Clean & Jerk	Stefan Georgiev (BUL)	165.0 kg	Le Maosheng (CHN)	165.0 kg	Sevdalin Minchev (BUL)	162.5 kg
Total	Stefan Georgiev (BUL)	295.0 kg	Le Maosheng (CHN)	295.0 kg	Sevdalin Minchev (BUL)	290.0 kg

== Records ==
Prior to this competition, the existing world records were as follows.

World record	Snatch	Hafız Süleymanoğlu (TUR)	140.0 kg	Warsaw, Poland	3 May 1995
World record	Clean & Jerk	Nikolay Peshalov (BUL)	170.0 kg	Warsaw, Poland	3 May 1995
World record	Total	Tang Lingsheng (CHN)	307.5 kg	Atlanta, United States	21 July 1996

== Results ==
Rank	Athlete	Body weight	Snatch (kg)				Clean & Jerk (kg)				Total
Rank	Athlete	Body weight	1	2	3	Rank	1	2	3	Rank	Total
1st place, gold medalist(s)	Stefan Georgiev (BUL)	58.60	125.0	130.0	~~132.5~~	2nd place, silver medalist(s)	157.5	162.5	165.0	1st place, gold medalist(s)	295.0
2nd place, silver medalist(s)	Le Maosheng (CHN)	59.00	130.0	~~135.0~~	~~135.0~~	3rd place, bronze medalist(s)	~~165.0~~	165.0	~~167.5~~	2nd place, silver medalist(s)	295.0
3rd place, bronze medalist(s)	Sevdalin Minchev (BUL)	58.60	127.5	~~132.5~~	~~132.5~~	4	157.5	162.5	~~170.0~~	3rd place, bronze medalist(s)	290.0
4	William Vargas (CUB)	58.70	127.5	~~130.0~~	132.5	1st place, gold medalist(s)	~~155.0~~	155.0	~~160.0~~	6	287.5
5	Elkhan Suleymanov (AZE)	58.55	120.0	125.0	~~130.0~~	5	150.0	157.5	~~160.0~~	5	282.5
6	Yurik Sarkisyan (AUS)	58.95	120.0	~~125.0~~	~~125.0~~	7	142.5	147.5	—	7	267.5
7	Sedat Artuç (TUR)	58.50	~~120.0~~	~~120.0~~	120.0	6	145.0	~~150.0~~	~~150.0~~	8	265.0
8	Chom Singhnoi (THA)	58.85	110.0	115.0	~~120.0~~	8	135.0	140.0	145.0	10	260.0
9	Mohamed Osman (EGY)	59.00	110.0	~~115.0~~	115.0	9	145.0	~~150.0~~	~~150.0~~	11	260.0
10	Kenji Tominaga (JPN)	58.55	112.5	~~117.5~~	~~117.5~~	11	145.0	~~147.5~~	~~147.5~~	9	257.5
11	Liu Te-tsung (TPE)	58.10	112.5	~~120.0~~	~~120.0~~	10	~~140.0~~	140.0	~~145.0~~	12	252.5
12	Vassiliy Lim (KAZ)	58.10	105.0	110.0	~~112.5~~	12	135.0	~~140.0~~	140.0	13	250.0
13	Chen Po-pu (TPE)	58.85	~~110.0~~	~~110.0~~	110.0	13	135.0	140.0	~~145.0~~	14	250.0
14	Sinchai Ketsri (THA)	58.95	~~110.0~~	~~110.0~~	110.0	14	135.0	140.0	~~145.0~~	15	250.0
15	Johnny Hernández (VEN)	58.95	105.0	~~110.0~~	~~110.0~~	15	~~140.0~~	140.0	~~145.0~~	16	245.0
16	Tom Goegebuer (BEL)	58.35	~~100.0~~	100.0	~~107.5~~	16	130.0	137.5	~~140.0~~	17	237.5
—	Hiroshi Ikehata (JPN)	58.65	~~125.0~~	~~125.0~~	~~125.0~~	—	152.5	160.0	~~165.0~~	4	—
—	Jyrki Welling (FIN)	58.85	~~110.0~~	~~110.0~~	~~110.0~~	—	152.5	~~137.5~~	—	18	—
—	Traian Cihărean (ROM)	58.95	—	—	—	—	—	—	—	—	—
