= Weightlifting at the 2000 Summer Olympics – Men's 62 kg =

Men's 62 kg at the Games of the XXVII Olympiad
- Venue: Sydney Convention and Exhibition Centre
- Date: 17 September 2000
- Competitors: 21 from 21 nations

Medalists
1st place, gold medalist(s)		Nikolaj Pešalov	Croatia
2nd place, silver medalist(s)		Leonidas Sabanis	Greece
3rd place, bronze medalist(s)		Henadzi Aliashchuk	Belarus

The men's 62 kilograms weightlifting event at the 2000 Summer Olympics in Sydney, Australia took place at the Sydney Convention and Exhibition Centre on September 17.

The total score was the sum of the lifter's best result in each snatch and the clean and jerk, with three lifts allowed for each lift. In case of a tie, the lighter lifter won; if still tied, the lifter who took the fewest attempts to achieve the total score won. Lifters without a valid snatch score did not perform the clean and jerk.

== Schedule ==
All times are Australian Eastern Time (UTC+10:00)

Date	Time	Event
17 September 2000	10:30	Group B
17 September 2000	18:30	Group A

== Records ==
{{{caption}}}
World Record	Snatch	Shi Zhiyong (CHN)	152.5 kg	Osaka, Japan	3 May 2000
World Record	Clean & Jerk	Le Maosheng (CHN)	180.5 kg	Athens, Greece	23 November 1999
World Record	Total	World Standard	325.0 kg	—	1 January 1998
Olympic Record	Snatch	Olympic Standard	142.5 kg	—	1 January 1997
Olympic Record	Clean & Jerk	Olympic Standard	177.5 kg	—	1 January 1997
Olympic Record	Total	Olympic Standard	320.0 kg	—	1 January 1997

== Results ==
Rank	Athlete	Group	Body weight	Snatch (kg)				Clean & Jerk (kg)				Total
Rank	Athlete	Group	Body weight	1	2	3	Result	1	2	3	Result	Total
1st place, gold medalist(s)	Nikolaj Pešalov (CRO)	A	61.56	145.0	~~150.0~~	150.0	150.0	175.0	~~185.0~~	—	175.0	325.0
2nd place, silver medalist(s)	Leonidas Sabanis (GRE)	A	61.30	142.5	147.5	~~150.0~~	147.5	170.0	~~175.0~~	~~175.0~~	170.0	317.5
3rd place, bronze medalist(s)	Henadzi Aliashchuk (BLR)	A	61.68	137.5	142.5	~~145.0~~	142.5	172.5	175.0	~~177.5~~	175.0	317.5
4	Le Maosheng (CHN)	A	61.28	140.0	~~145.0~~	~~145.0~~	140.0	175.0	~~177.5~~	~~177.5~~	175.0	315.0
5	Mehdi Panzvan (IRI)	A	61.52	~~140.0~~	140.0	~~145.0~~	140.0	162.5	~~172.5~~	~~172.5~~	162.5	302.5
6	Hiroshi Ikehata (JPN)	B	61.78	135.0	~~140.0~~	~~140.0~~	135.0	165.0	~~172.5~~	~~172.5~~	165.0	300.0
7	Vladimir Popov (MDA)	B	61.56	130.0	135.0	~~137.5~~	135.0	~~160.0~~	~~160.0~~	160.0	160.0	295.0
8	Elkhan Suleymanov (AZE)	B	61.84	130.0	~~135.0~~	~~135.0~~	130.0	~~162.5~~	~~162.5~~	162.5	162.5	292.5
9	Yurik Sarkisyan (AUS)	A	61.74	125.0	~~130.0~~	~~130.0~~	125.0	160.0	165.0	~~167.5~~	165.0	290.0
10	Zoltán Farkas (HUN)	A	61.76	127.5	132.5	~~135.0~~	132.5	155.0	~~160.0~~	~~160.0~~	155.0	287.5
11	Marcus Stephen (NRU)	A	61.60	115.0	122.5	~~127.5~~	122.5	152.5	162.5	~~167.5~~	162.5	285.0
12	Samson Matam (FRA)	B	61.88	125.0	~~130.0~~	~~130.0~~	125.0	160.0	~~165.0~~	~~165.0~~	160.0	285.0
13	Dmitriy Lomakin (KAZ)	B	61.92	125.0	130.0	132.5	132.5	150.0	~~155.0~~	~~155.0~~	150.0	282.5
14	Kim Young-tae (KOR)	B	61.92	~~120.0~~	~~120.0~~	120.0	120.0	155.0	~~165.0~~	~~165.0~~	155.0	275.0
15	Sunday Mathias (NGR)	B	61.24	110.0	115.0	~~120.0~~	115.0	150.0	~~155.0~~	~~155.0~~	150.0	265.0
—	Im Yong-su (PRK)	B	61.70	~~130.0~~	132.5	137.5	137.5	~~167.5~~	~~167.5~~	~~170.0~~	—	—
—	Ümürbek Bazarbaýew (TKM)	B	61.78	117.5	122.5	125.0	125.0	~~150.0~~	~~150.0~~	~~150.0~~	—	—
—	Aleksey Bortkov (RUS)	A	61.82	~~130.0~~	~~130.0~~	~~130.0~~	—	—	—	—	—	—
—	Naim Süleymanoğlu (TUR)	A	61.90	~~145.0~~	~~145.0~~	~~145.0~~	—	—	—	—	—	—
—	Chom Singhnoi (THA)	B	61.92	~~122.5~~	~~122.5~~	~~122.5~~	—	—	—	—	—	—
DQ	Sevdalin Minchev (BUL)	A	61.56	140.0	~~145.0~~	~~145.0~~	140.0	~~172.5~~	172.5	177.5	177.5	~~317.5~~

- Sevdalin Minchev of Bulgaria originally won the bronze medal, but he was disqualified after he tested positive for furosemide.

== New records ==
Snatch	147.5 kg	Nikolaj Pešalov (CRO)	OR
Snatch	147.5 kg	Leonidas Sabanis (GRE)	OR
Snatch	150.0 kg	Nikolaj Pešalov (CRO)	OR
Total	325.0 kg	Nikolaj Pešalov (CRO)	OR
