= Stefan Georgiev =

Stefan Georgiev may refer to:

- Stefan Georgiev (skier) (born 1977), Bulgarian alpine skier
- Stefan Georgiev (weightlifter) (born 1975), Bulgarian weightlifter, 1997 World Weightlifting Champion – Men's 59 kg
- Stefan Georgiev (swimmer) (born 1955), Bulgarian swimmer
