= Weightlifting at the 2010 South American Games – Women's 53kg =

The Women's 53 kg event at the 2010 South American Games was held over March 26 at 18:00.

== Medalists ==
Gold	Silver	Bronze
Inmara Henríquez; Venezuela	Rusmeris Villar; Colombia	Alexandra Andagoya; Ecuador

== Results ==
Rank	Athlete	Bodyweight	Snatch			Clean & Jerk			Total
Rank	Athlete	Bodyweight	1	2	3	1	2	3	Total
1st place, gold medalist(s)	Inmara Henríquez (VEN)	52.67	78	81	~~83~~	101	~~107~~	~~107~~	182
2nd place, silver medalist(s)	Rusmeris Villar (COL)	52.44	~~81~~	81	~~85~~	100	~~105~~	~~106~~	181
3rd place, bronze medalist(s)	Alexandra Andagoya (ECU)	52.10	69	72	~~75~~	88	90	~~95~~	162
4	Rosane Santos (BRA)	52.03	~~70~~	~~71~~	71	85	~~89~~	~~91~~	156
5	Massiel Valverde (CHI)	52.60	67	71	~~73~~	80	~~85~~	85	156
6	Gabriela Ypshie Vera (CHI)	52.12	~~62~~	~~62~~	62	~~82~~	82	~~91~~	144
7	Sara Cajareico (BOL)	52.26	~~55~~	55	~~58~~	68	72	74	129
8	Eugenia Cavero (ARG)	50.06	55	~~58~~	58	65	69	~~73~~	127
