= Weightlifting at the 2010 South American Games =

- Venue: Plaza Mayor
- Dates: March 26-29

There were 15 weightlifting events at the 2010 South American Games. Competitions were held over March 26–29. All games were played at Plaza Mayor.

== Medal summary ==
=== Medal table ===
Rank	Nation	Gold	Silver	Bronze	Total
1	Colombia (COL)	8	4	2	14
2	Ecuador (ECU)	4	1	5	10
3	Venezuela (VEN)	3	8	3	14
4	Brazil (BRA)	0	2	1	3
5	Argentina (ARG)	0	0	2	2
6	Chile (CHI)	0	0	1	1
Totals (6 entries)		15	15	14	44

== Men ==
Event	Gold	Silver	Bronze
Men's 56 kg	Sergio Rada; Colombia	Jhon Fuentes; Venezuela	no medal
Men's 62 kg	Diego Fernando Salazar; Colombia	Jesús López; Venezuela	Edison Reina; Ecuador
Men's 69 kg	Israel Rubio; Venezuela	Doiler Sanchez; Colombia	Enrique Valencia; Ecuador
Men's 77 kg	Yony Andica; Colombia	José Ocando; Venezuela	Freddy Tenorio; Ecuador
Men's 85 kg	Diego Fernando Salazar; Colombia	Jesús López; Venezuela	Edison Reina; Ecuador
Men's 94 kg	Wilmer Torres; Colombia	Leomar Albarran; Venezuela	Jose Barros; Argentina
Men's 105 kg	Jorge Arroyo; Ecuador	Julio Luna; Venezuela	Leonel Albarran; Venezuela
Men's +105 kg	Julio Arteaga; Ecuador	Fernando Reis; Brazil	Luis Carlos Santamaria; Colombia

== Women ==
Event	Gold	Silver	Bronze
Women's 48 kg	Betsi Rivas; Venezuela	María Vásquez; Ecuador	Aline Campeiro; Brazil
Women's 53 kg	Inmara Henríquez; Venezuela	Rusmeris Villar; Colombia	Alexandra Andagoya; Ecuador
Women's 58 kg	Alexandra Escobar; Ecuador	Jackelina Heredia; Colombia	Lina Rivas; Colombia
Women's 63 kg	Nisida Palomeque; Colombia	Mercedes Pérez; Colombia	Iriner Jiménez; Venezuela
Women's 69 kg	Leydi Solís; Colombia	Jaqueline Ferreira; Brazil	Belen Martinez; Argentina
Women's 75 kg	Ubaldina Valoyes; Colombia	Yarvanis Herrera; Venezuela	Maria Alvarez; Venezuela
Women's +75 kg	Oliba Nieve; Ecuador	Yaniuska Espinosa; Venezuela	Elizabeth Cortéz; Chile
