= Nuno Alves =

Portuguese weightlifter (born 1973)

Personal information
- Born: 8 February 1973 (age 52)
- Weight: 61.10 kg (134.7 lb)

Sport
- Country: Portugal
- Sport: Weightlifting
- Weight class: 62 kg
- Team: National team
- Updated on 3 October 2016

Nuno Alves (born 8 February 1973) is a Portuguese male weightlifter, competing in the 62 kg category and representing Portugal at international competitions. He participated at the 1996 Summer Olympics in the 59 kg event. He competed at world championships, most recently at the 1998 World Weightlifting Championships.

== Major results ==
Year	Venue	Weight	Snatch (kg)				Clean & Jerk (kg)				Total	Rank
Year	Venue	Weight	1	2	3	Rank	1	2	3	Rank	Total	Rank
Summer Olympics
1996	Atlanta, United States	59 kg				—N/a				—N/a		14
World Championships
1998	Lahti, Finland	62 kg	102.5	107.5	~~110~~	20	130	~~135~~	~~135~~	20	237.5	19
