= Yacine Zouaki =

Moroccan weightlifter

Personal information
- Nationality: Moroccan
- Born: 3 August 1980 (age 44)

Sport
- Sport: Weightlifting

Yacine Zouaki (born 3 August 1980) is a Moroccan weightlifter. He competed in the men's featherweight event at the 2004 Summer Olympics.
