= Baghramyan, Parakar =

Village in Armavir, Armenia

Baghramyan Բաղրամյանի
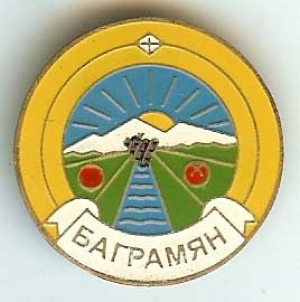
- Coat of arms

- Location within Armenia
- Coordinates: 40°11′36″N 44°22′07″E
- Country: Armenia
- Province: Armavir
- Municipality: Parakar
- Founded: 1947

Population (2011)
  - Total: 2,838
- Time zone: UTC+4 ( )
  - Summer (DST): UTC+5 ( )

Baghramyan (Armenian: Բաղրամյան) is a village in the Armavir Province of Armenia. It is named after the Soviet Armenian military commander and Marshal of the Soviet Union Ivan Bagramyan.

== Notable people ==
- Arakel Mirzoyan, European champion in weightlifting
