= Weightlifting at the 2007 Pan American Games – Men's 62 kg =

Weightlifting – Men's 62 kg at the 2007 Pan American Games
- Venue: Complexo Esportivo Riocentro
- Dates: 14 July 2007
- Competitors: 4 from 4 nations
- Winning total weight: 290 kg

Medalists
Gold medal	Diego Salazar	Colombia
Silver medal	Miñan Mogollon	Peru
Bronze medal	David Mendoza	Honduras

The Men's 62 kg weightlifting event at the 2007 Pan American Games took place at the Complexo Esportivo Riocentro on 14 July 2007.

== Schedule ==
All times are Brasilia Time (UTC-3)

Date	Time	Event
14 July 2007	18:00	Group A

== Records ==
Prior to this competition, the existing world, Pan American and Games records were as follows:

World record	Snatch	Shi Zhiyong (CHN)	153 kg	İzmir, Turkey	28 June 2002
World record	Clean & Jerk	Le Maosheng (CHN)	182 kg	Busan, South Korea	2 October 2002
World record	Total	World Standard	325 kg	–	1 January 1998
Pan American record	Snatch				
Pan American record	Clean & Jerk				
Pan American record	Total				
Games record	Snatch	Diego Salazar (COL)	140 kg	Santo Domingo, Dominican Republic	12 August 2003
Games record	Clean & Jerk	Diego Salazar (COL)	170 kg	Santo Domingo, Dominican Republic	12 August 2003
Games record	Total	Diego Salazar (COL)	310 kg	Santo Domingo, Dominican Republic	12 August 2003

== Results ==
Rank	Athlete	Nation	Group	Body weight	Snatch (kg)					Clean & Jerk (kg)					Total
Rank	Athlete	Nation	Group	Body weight	1	2	3	Result	Rank	1	2	3	Result	Rank	Total
1st place, gold medalist(s)	Diego Salazar	Colombia	A	61.30	~~125~~	125	130	130	1	155	160	~~165~~	160	1	290
2nd place, silver medalist(s)	Miñan Mogollon	Peru	A	61.25	100	103	~~105~~	103	4	126	130	133	133	2	236
3rd place, bronze medalist(s)	David Mendoza	Honduras	A	61.30	100	104	105	105	2	127	130	~~134~~	130	3	235
4	Alexandre Hoffmann	Brazil	A	61.40	100	104	~~105~~	104	3	127	~~130~~	~~130~~	127	4	231
