= Toshio Imamura =

Japanese weightlifter

Personal information
- Born: 25 December 1979 (age 45); Enzan, Japan
- Height: 163 cm (5 ft 4 in)
- Weight: 61.58 kg (135.8 lb)

Sport
- Country: Japan
- Sport: Weightlifting
- Weight class: 62 kg
- Team: National team
- Updated on 8 September 2016

Toshio Imamura (今村 俊雄, Imamura Toshio, born 25 December 1979 in Enzan) is a Japanese male weightlifter, competing in the 62 kg category and representing Japan at international competitions. He participated at the 2004 Summer Olympics in the 62 kg event. He competed at world championships, most recently at the 2007 World Weightlifting Championships.

== Major results ==
Year	Venue	Weight	Snatch (kg)				Clean & Jerk (kg)				Total	Rank
Year	Venue	Weight	1	2	3	Rank	1	2	3	Rank	Total	Rank
Summer Olympics
2004	Athens, Italy	62 kg										11
World Championships
2007	Chiang Mai, Thailand	62 kg	117	120	~~121~~	28	144	148	150	22	270	23
2006	Santo Domingo, Dominican Republic	62 kg	111	116	~~119~~	25	137	142	144	25	260.0	23
2002	Warsaw, Poland	62 kg	~~120~~	120	125	10	152.5	~~157.5~~	~~157.5~~	10	277.5	10
