= 2013 World Weightlifting Championships – Men's 69 kg =

The men's competition in the –69 kg division was held on 23 October 2013 in Centennial Hall, Wrocław, Poland.

== Schedule ==
Date	Time	Event
23 October 2013	10:00	Group B
23 October 2013	19:55	Group A

== Medalists ==
Event	Gold		Silver		Bronze	
Snatch	Liao Hui (CHN)	160 kg	Oleg Chen (RUS)	160 kg	Kim Myong-hyok (PRK)	152 kg
Clean & Jerk	Liao Hui (CHN)	198 kg	Kim Myong-hyok (PRK)	185 kg	Liang Chenxi (CHN)	183 kg
Total	Liao Hui (CHN)	358 kg	Oleg Chen (RUS)	340 kg	Kim Myong-hyok (PRK)	337 kg

== Records ==
Prior to this competition, the existing world records were as follows.

World Record	Snatch	Georgi Markov (BUL)	165 kg	Sydney, Australia	20 September 2000
World Record	Clean & Jerk	Zhang Guozheng (CHN)	197 kg	Qinhuangdao, China	11 September 2003
World Record	Total	Galabin Boevski (BUL)	357 kg	Athens, Greece	24 November 1999

== Results ==
Rank	Athlete	Group	Body weight	Snatch (kg)				Clean & Jerk (kg)				Total
Rank	Athlete	Group	Body weight	1	2	3	Rank	1	2	3	Rank	Total
1st place, gold medalist(s)	Liao Hui (CHN)	A	68.52	155	160	~~166~~	1st place, gold medalist(s)	186	195	198	1st place, gold medalist(s)	358
2nd place, silver medalist(s)	Oleg Chen (RUS)	A	68.81	151	156	160	2nd place, silver medalist(s)	175	180	~~184~~	5	340
3rd place, bronze medalist(s)	Kim Myong-hyok (PRK)	A	68.85	145	150	152	3rd place, bronze medalist(s)	180	185	~~190~~	2nd place, silver medalist(s)	337
4	Jaber Behrouzi (IRI)	A	68.68	144	~~147~~	147	5	176	183	~~186~~	4	330
5	Liang Chenxi (CHN)	A	68.61	~~145~~	~~145~~	145	7	175	180	183	3rd place, bronze medalist(s)	328
6	Junior Sánchez (VEN)	A	69.00	~~147~~	~~147~~	147	6	171	178	~~179~~	6	325
7	Daniel Godelli (ALB)	A	68.56	~~145~~	147	~~151~~	4	~~175~~	175	~~182~~	7	322
8	Bernardin Matam (FRA)	A	68.58	139	~~142~~	~~142~~	9	168	171	~~173~~	8	310
9	Sajjad Behrouzi (IRI)	A	68.42	140	~~145~~	~~145~~	8	168	~~175~~	~~175~~	11	308
10	Robert Joachim (GER)	B	68.64	132	135	137	10	165	170	~~173~~	9	307
11	Vanik Avetisyan (ARM)	A	68.85	132	~~137~~	137	11	170	~~175~~	~~175~~	10	307
12	Enrique Valencia (ECU)	B	67.77	127	132	135	12	161	165	~~168~~	13	300
13	José Gavino Mena (COL)	A	68.64	135	~~140~~	~~140~~	13	165	~~173~~	~~173~~	14	300
14	Doston Yokubov (UZB)	B	68.80	~~125~~	125	129	17	160	166	~~172~~	12	295
15	Francis Luna-Grenier (CAN)	B	68.76	126	130	~~133~~	16	158	162	~~165~~	15	292
16	Albert Linder (KAZ)	B	66.78	125	~~130~~	130	15	145	150	160	16	290
17	Caleb Williams (USA)	B	68.98	122	~~126~~	~~126~~	18	160	~~167~~	~~168~~	17	282
18	Ekrem Ağıllı (TUR)	B	68.65	125	130	133	14	145	~~152~~	~~155~~	18	278
19	Natthawut Suepsuan (THA)	B	68.65	~~120~~	120	~~126~~	19	~~140~~	140	145	19	265
20	Thiraphat Sophalai (THA)	B	66.52	105	110	~~115~~	20	130	135	~~140~~	20	245
21	Ian Rose (SEY)	B	69.00	97	103	107	21	130	135	~~138~~	21	242
22	Ahmad Sabbagh (LIB)	B	68.16	~~92~~	92	97	22	118	122	127	22	224
DQ	Firidun Guliyev (AZE)	A	68.29	140	~~143~~	143	—	185	~~194~~	194	—	—

== New records ==
Clean & Jerk	198 kg	Liao Hui (CHN)	WR
Total	358 kg	Liao Hui (CHN)	WR
