= Sunday Mathias =

Nigerian weightlifter

Personal information
- Nationality: Nigerian
- Born: 1 October 1980 (age 44)

Sport
- Sport: Weightlifting

Sunday Mathias (born 1 October 1980) is a Nigerian former weightlifter. He competed in the men's featherweight event at the 2000 Summer Olympics.
