= Hovannes Amreyan =

Armenian weightlifter (born 1975)

Personal information
- Nationality: Armenian
- Born: 3 October 1975 (age 51) Gyumri, Armenia
Medal record
Men's weightlifting
Representing Armenia
European Championships
Silver medal – second place	2001 Trenčín	-77 kg

Hovannes Amreyan (born 3 October 1975 in Gyumri) is an Armenian weightlifter. He won a silver medal at the 2001 European Weightlifting Championships.
