= Morteza Rezaeian =

Iranian weightlifter (born 1989)

Personal information
- Nationality: Iranian
- Born: 14 June 1989 (age 37)
- Weight: 68.68 kg (151.4 lb)

Sport
- Country: Iran
- Sport: Weightlifting
- Event: 69 kg

Achievements and titles
- Personal bests: Snatch: 147 kg (2010); Clean and jerk: 177 kg (2010); Total: 324 kg (2010)
Medal record
Men's weightlifting
Representing Iran
Asian Games
Silver medal – second place	2010 Guangzhou	69 kg
Asian Championships
Silver medal – second place	2011 Tongling	69 kg

Morteza Rezaeian (Persian: مرتضی رضائیان, born 14 June 1989) is an Iranian weightlifter who won a silver medal at the 2010 Guangzhou Asian Games.

== Major results ==
Year	Venue	Weight	Snatch (kg)				Clean & Jerk (kg)				Total	Rank
Year	Venue	Weight	1	2	3	Rank	1	2	3	Rank	Total	Rank
World Championships
2010	Antalya, Turkey	69 kg	~~145~~	145	~~150~~	4	~~173~~	~~173~~	~~175~~	--	--	--
2014	Almaty, Kazakhstan	69 kg	135	~~139~~	139	16	~~165~~	~~165~~	~~167~~	--	--	--
Asian Games
2010	Guangzhou, China	69 kg	143	147	~~150~~	2	~~173~~	173	177	3	324	2nd place, silver medalist(s)
Asian Championships
2007	Shandong, China	62 kg	119			7	135			8	254	8
2011	Tongling, China	69 kg	~~141~~	~~141~~	141	2nd place, silver medalist(s)	~~171~~	~~171~~	173	3rd place, bronze medalist(s)	314	2nd place, silver medalist(s)
2012	Pyeongtaek, South Korea	69 kg	141	~~146~~	~~146~~	6	171	177	~~184~~	3rd place, bronze medalist(s)	318	4
World Junior Championships
2008	Cali, Colombia	69 kg	128	133	~~136~~	6	157	~~165~~	~~167~~	8	290	6
2009	Bucharest, Romania	69 kg	135	~~140~~	~~140~~	6	161	167	171	3rd place, bronze medalist(s)	306	4
