= Weightlifting at the 2008 Summer Olympics – Men's 62 kg =

Men's 62 kg at the Games of the XXIX Olympiad
- Venue: Beihang University Gymnasium
- Date: 11 August 2008
- Competitors: 17 from 15 nations

Medalists
1st place, gold medalist(s)		Zhang Xiangxiang	China
2nd place, silver medalist(s)		Diego Salazar	Colombia
3rd place, bronze medalist(s)		Triyatno	Indonesia

The men's 62 kilograms weightlifting event was the second-lightest men's event at the weightlifting competition, limiting competitors to a maximum of 62 kilograms of body mass. The whole competition took place on August 11, but was divided in two parts due to the number of competitors. Group B weightlifters competed at 10:00, and Group A, at 19:00. This event was the fifth weightlifting event to conclude.

Each lifter performed in both the snatch and clean and jerk lifts, with the final score being the sum of the lifter's best result in each. The athlete received three attempts in each of the two lifts; the score for the lift was the heaviest weight successfully lifted.

== Schedule ==
All times are China Standard Time (UTC+08:00)

Date	Time	Event
11 August 2008	10:00	Group B
11 August 2008	19:00	Group A

== Records ==
Prior to this competition, the existing world and Olympic records were as follows.

World Record	Snatch	Shi Zhiyong (CHN)	153 kg	İzmir, Turkey	28 June 2002
World Record	Clean & Jerk	Le Maosheng (CHN)	182 kg	Busan, South Korea	2 October 2002
World Record	Total	Zhang Jie (CHN)	326 kg	Kanazawa, Japan	28 April 2008
Olympic Record	Snatch	Shi Zhiyong (CHN)	152 kg	Athens, Greece	16 August 2004
Olympic Record	Clean & Jerk	Olympic Standard	177 kg	—	1 January 1997
Olympic Record	Total	Nikolaj Pešalov (CRO)	325 kg	Sydney, Australia	17 September 2000

== Results ==
Rank	Athlete	Group	Body weight	Snatch (kg)				Clean & Jerk (kg)				Total
Rank	Athlete	Group	Body weight	1	2	3	Result	1	2	3	Result	Total
1st place, gold medalist(s)	Zhang Xiangxiang (CHN)	A	61.91	139	~~143~~	143	143	169	176	~~184~~	176	319
2nd place, silver medalist(s)	Diego Salazar (COL)	A	61.47	132	136	138	138	163	165	167	167	305
3rd place, bronze medalist(s)	Triyatno (INA)	A	61.90	133	~~135~~	135	135	~~163~~	~~163~~	163	163	298
4	Antoniu Buci (ROU)	A	61.66	126	~~130~~	130	130	161	165	~~168~~	165	295
5	Phaisan Hansawong (THA)	A	61.60	132	~~135~~	~~135~~	132	~~162~~	162	~~166~~	162	294
6	Lázaro Ruiz (CUB)	A	61.75	128	132	~~135~~	132	162	~~168~~	~~168~~	162	294
7	Tolkunbek Hudaýbergenow (TKM)	A	61.96	~~126~~	126	~~131~~	126	162	~~170~~	~~170~~	162	288
8	Mohamed Abdelbaki (EGY)	B	62.00	~~129~~	~~129~~	129	129	155	159	~~164~~	159	288
9	Yang Sheng-hsiung (TPE)	B	61.97	125	130	~~134~~	130	151	157	~~163~~	157	287
10	Henadzi Makhveyenia (BLR)	B	61.95	120	~~128~~	128	128	150	~~156~~	~~156~~	150	278
11	Manuel Minginfel (FSM)	B	61.69	115	120	~~123~~	120	145	150	155	155	275
12	Jasvir Singh (CAN)	B	61.67	110	115	~~118~~	115	145	151	~~156~~	151	266
—	Ji Hun-min (KOR)	A	61.91	137	140	142	142	~~161~~	~~161~~	~~161~~	—	—
—	Im Yong-su (PRK)	A	61.60	~~138~~	138	~~140~~	138	~~168~~	~~168~~	~~168~~	—	—
—	Óscar Figueroa (COL)	A	61.66	~~128~~	~~128~~	~~128~~	—	—	—	—	—	—
—	Ümürbek Bazarbaýew (TKM)	A	61.96	133	~~136~~	~~137~~	133	~~160~~	~~160~~	~~162~~	—	—
DQ	Sardar Hasanov (AZE)	B	61.96	~~128~~	~~128~~	128	128	~~152~~	~~152~~	~~152~~	—	—
