= 2003 World Weightlifting Championships – Men's 56 kg =

The 2003 World Weightlifting Championships were held in Vancouver, Canada from 14 November to 22 November. The men's 56 kilograms division was staged on 14 November 2003.

== Schedule ==
Date	Time	Event
14 November 2003	10:00	Group C
14 November 2003	16:00	Group B
14 November 2003	20:00	Group A

== Medalists ==
Event	Gold		Silver		Bronze	
Snatch	Wu Meijin (CHN)	127.5 kg	Sedat Artuç (TUR)	125.0 kg	Lu Jinbi (CHN)	125.0 kg
Clean & Jerk	Wu Meijin (CHN)	160.0 kg	Wang Shin-yuan (TPE)	155.0 kg	Adrian Jigău (ROM)	155.0 kg
Total	Wu Meijin (CHN)	287.5 kg	Adrian Jigău (ROM)	277.5 kg	Sedat Artuç (TUR)	277.5 kg

== Records ==
Prior to this competition, the existing world records were as follows.

World Record	Snatch	Halil Mutlu (TUR)	138.5 kg	Antalya, Turkey	4 November 2001
World Record	Clean & Jerk	Halil Mutlu (TUR)	168.0 kg	Trenčín, Slovakia	24 April 2001
World Record	Total	Halil Mutlu (TUR)	305.0 kg	Sydney, Australia	16 September 2000

== Results ==
Rank	Athlete	Group	Body weight	Snatch (kg)				Clean & Jerk (kg)				Total
Rank	Athlete	Group	Body weight	1	2	3	Rank	1	2	3	Rank	Total
1st place, gold medalist(s)	Wu Meijin (CHN)	A	55.70	122.5	127.5	~~130.0~~	1st place, gold medalist(s)	155.0	160.0	~~165.0~~	1st place, gold medalist(s)	287.5
2nd place, silver medalist(s)	Adrian Jigău (ROM)	A	55.94	120.0	~~125.0~~	125.0	5	150.0	~~155.0~~	155.0	3rd place, bronze medalist(s)	280.0
3rd place, bronze medalist(s)	Sedat Artuç (TUR)	A	55.49	120.0	~~125.0~~	125.0	2nd place, silver medalist(s)	145.0	~~150.0~~	152.5	4	277.5
4	Lu Jinbi (CHN)	A	55.70	120.0	125.0	~~127.5~~	3rd place, bronze medalist(s)	~~152.5~~	152.5	~~157.5~~	5	277.5
5	Wang Shin-yuan (TPE)	A	55.86	~~122.5~~	122.5	~~125.0~~	7	150.0	155.0	~~160.0~~	2nd place, silver medalist(s)	277.5
6	Vitali Dzerbianiou (BLR)	A	55.92	120.0	~~125.0~~	125.0	4	142.5	147.5	152.5	6	277.5
7	Jadi Setiadi (INA)	A	54.19	117.5	~~122.5~~	122.5	6	~~147.5~~	147.5	~~152.5~~	7	270.0
8	Yang Chin-yi (TPE)	A	55.66	120.0	~~125.0~~	~~125.0~~	10	~~145.0~~	145.0	~~152.5~~	9	265.0
9	Mohammed Abdul-Monem (IRQ)	A	55.96	112.5	117.5	122.5	8	137.5	~~142.5~~	~~142.5~~	18	260.0
10	Viktor Chislean (MDA)	B	55.60	112.5	117.5	120.0	9	132.5	~~137.5~~	137.5	15	257.5
11	Nelson Castro (COL)	A	55.17	110.0	~~115.0~~	~~115.0~~	13	140.0	~~145.0~~	145.0	8	255.0
12	Abdullatif Al-Abdullatif (KSA)	A	55.69	105.0	~~110.0~~	110.0	14	~~145.0~~	145.0	~~150.0~~	10	255.0
13	Éric Bonnel (FRA)	B	55.74	110.0	115.0	~~117.5~~	11	135.0	~~140.0~~	140.0	12	255.0
14	Asif Malikov (AZE)	B	55.75	~~105.0~~	105.0	110.0	16	~~135.0~~	135.0	140.0	13	250.0
15	Víctor Castellano (VEN)	B	55.80	~~110.0~~	~~110.0~~	110.0	17	~~140.0~~	140.0	~~142.5~~	14	250.0
16	Yasuji Kikuzuma (JPN)	B	55.63	105.0	107.5	~~110.0~~	20	~~140.0~~	140.0	~~142.5~~	11	247.5
17	Nafaa Benami (ALG)	B	55.81	110.0	~~115.0~~	~~115.0~~	18	132.5	137.5	~~140.0~~	16	247.5
18	Ji Hun-min (KOR)	B	55.92	~~112.5~~	112.5	~~117.5~~	12	~~132.5~~	132.5	135.0	20	247.5
19	Agus (INA)	B	55.94	105.0	110.0	~~115.0~~	19	~~137.5~~	137.5	~~142.5~~	17	247.5
20	Vicky Batta (IND)	B	55.71	110.0	~~115.0~~	~~115.0~~	15	132.5	~~137.5~~	~~137.5~~	22	242.5
21	Tolkunbek Hudaýbergenow (TKM)	B	55.85	105.0	~~110.0~~	~~110.0~~	23	130.0	135.0	~~140.0~~	19	240.0
22	Ruslan Ignatiuc (MDA)	C	55.57	~~105.0~~	105.0	~~107.5~~	22	~~130.0~~	130.0	132.5	21	237.5
23	Theocharis Chatzidis (GRE)	C	55.79	~~102.5~~	102.5	~~105.0~~	28	127.5	132.5	~~137.5~~	23	235.0
24	Valluri Srinivasa Rao (IND)	C	55.95	100.0	~~105.0~~	105.0	26	130.0	~~132.5~~	~~135.0~~	25	235.0
25	Andrey Rodionov (KAZ)	C	55.95	~~100.0~~	100.0	105.0	25	125.0	~~130.0~~	~~130.0~~	27	230.0
26	Mohamed Abdelbaki (EGY)	C	55.37	100.0	105.0	~~107.5~~	21	122.5	~~127.5~~	~~127.5~~	28	227.5
27	Erkand Qerimaj (ALB)	C	55.42	95.0	~~100.0~~	100.0	29	122.5	127.5	~~132.5~~	26	227.5
28	Vito Dellino (ITA)	C	55.83	90.0	~~95.0~~	~~95.0~~	31	~~130.0~~	~~130.0~~	130.0	24	220.0
29	Iván Hernández (ESP)	C	55.51	95.0	~~100.0~~	~~100.0~~	30	120.0	~~125.0~~	~~125.0~~	29	215.0
30	Víctor Castro (PER)	C	55.96	~~90.0~~	90.0	~~95.0~~	32	117.5	~~122.5~~	~~122.5~~	30	207.5
—	László Tancsics (HUN)	A	55.35	~~120.0~~	~~120.0~~	~~120.0~~	—	—	—	—	—	—
—	Gert Trasha (ALB)	C	55.38	~~100.0~~	—	—	—	—	—	—	—	—
—	Masaharu Yamada (JPN)	B	55.56	102.5	~~105.0~~	~~105.0~~	27	~~142.5~~	~~142.5~~	~~142.5~~	—	—
—	Marvin López (ESA)	C	55.90	~~105.0~~	105.0	~~107.5~~	24	~~130.0~~	—	—	—	—
DQ	Sanjar Kadyrbergenow (TKM)	B	55.65	107.5	~~112.5~~	~~112.5~~	—	125.0	~~130.0~~	130.0	—	—
