= Roger Berrio =

Colombian weightlifter (born 1972)

Personal information
- Born: October 30, 1972 (age 53)
Medal record
Men's Weightlifting
Representing Colombia
Pan American Games
Silver medal – second place	1999 Winnipeg	– 62 kg
Bronze medal – third place	1995 Mar del Plata	– 59 kg

Roger Berrio Hernández (born October 30, 1972) is a retired male weightlifter from Colombia, who twice won a medal for his native South American country at the Pan American Games: in 1995 and 1999. He twice competed at the Summer Olympics (1992 and 1996), finishing in 26th place in the men's featherweight division in Atlanta, Georgia (1996).

== Major results ==
Year	Venue	Weight	Snatch (kg)				Clean & Jerk (kg)				Total	Rank
Year	Venue	Weight	1	2	3	Rank	1	2	3	Rank	Total	Rank
World Championships
2003	Vancouver, Canada	62 kg	120	125	~~127.5~~	11	~~147.5~~	147.5	150	13	275	11
1998	Lahti, Finland	62 kg	115	120	122.5	13	145	150	~~155~~	14	272.5	13
