= Oleksandr Likhvald =

Ukrainian weightlifter

Personal information
- Full name: Olexandr Lykhvald
- Born: 1 January 1978 (age 48)
- Weight: 61.88 kg (136.4 lb)

Sport
- Country: Ukraine
- Sport: Weightlifting
- Weight class: 62 kg
- Team: National team
- Updated on 14 September 2016

Oleksandr Anatoliyovych Likhvald (Ukrainian: Олександр Анатолійович Ліхвальд; born September 9, 1978) is a retired male weightlifter from Ukraine. He competed for his native country at the 2000 Summer Olympics in the men's bantamweight division (– 56 kg), finishing in 9th place in the final standings. He competed at world championships, most recently at the 2003 World Weightlifting Championships.

== Major results ==
Year	Venue	Weight	Snatch (kg)				Clean & Jerk (kg)				Total	Rank
Year	Venue	Weight	1	2	3	Rank	1	2	3	Rank	Total	Rank
World Championships
2003	Vancouver, Canada	62 kg	125	130	132.5	4	155	160	~~162.5~~	6	292.5	6
2002	Warsaw, Poland	62 kg	130	~~135~~	~~135~~	6	157.5	162.5	~~170~~	5	292.5	5
2001	Antalya, Turkey	62 kg	130	~~135~~	~~135~~	8	160	~~165~~	~~165~~	8	290	9
1999	Piraeus, Greece	56 kg	120	~~125~~	~~125~~	8	147.5	152.5	~~157.5~~	6	272.5	7
