= Aleksey Bortkov =

Russian weightlifter

Alexey Bortkov
Personal information
- Full name: Aleksey Aleksandrovich Bortkov
- Born: 26 July 1976 (age 49) Irkutsk, Russia
- Weight: 61.82 kg (136.3 lb)

Sport
- Country: Russia
- Sport: Weightlifting
- Weight class: 62 kg
- Club: CSKN (Central Sport Klub Navy)
- Team: National team
- Updated on 8 October 2016

Aleksey Aleksandrovich Bortkov Russian: Алексей Александрович Бортков, born 26 July 1976 in Irkutsk) is a Russian weightlifter. He competed in the 62 kg category and represented Russia at international competitions. He participated at the 2000 Summer Olympics in the 62 kg event.

== Major results ==
Year	Venue	Weight	Snatch (kg)				Clean & Jerk (kg)				Total	Rank
Year	Venue	Weight	1	2	3	Rank	1	2	3	Rank	Total	Rank
Summer Olympics
2000	Sydney, Australia	62 kg	~~130~~	~~130~~	~~130~~	—N/a	---	---	---	—N/a	0	---
