= Arakel Mirzoyan =

Armenian weightlifter (born 1989)

Personal information
- Born: October 21, 1989 (age 36) Baghramyan, Vagharshapat, Armenia, Soviet Union
- Height: 1.7 m (5 ft 7 in)
- Weight: 84 kg (185 lb)
Medal record
Representing Armenia
Men's weightlifting
World Championships
| Silver medal – second place | 2009 Goyang | -69 kg |
European Championships
| Gold medal – first place | 2009 Bucharest | -69 kg |

Arakel Mirzoyan (Armenian: Առաքել Միրզոյան; born October 21, 1989) is an Armenian weightlifter.

== Early life ==
Arakel Mirzoyan was born in Baghramyan, Vagharshapat, Armenian SSR. His father, Oksen Mirzoyan, was a weightlifter who won an Olympic gold medal at the 1988 Summer Olympics in Seoul, the then Head Coach of the Armenian national weightlifting team and the current Chairman of the Armenian Weightlifting Federation. Mirzoyan began following in his father's footsteps at a young age. His own weightlift career started when he lifted 20 kg weight at the age of 5. Since then, Arakel has devoted his life to weightlifting.

== Career ==
Mirzoyan won various junior championships. The Armenian weightlifter won silver at the 2007 European Youth Championships in Landskrona with a total of 257 kg. A year later, in the city of Durrës, he became champion of Europe with a total of 310 kg. In the same year, at the World Youth Championships in Cali, with a total of 302 kg, Arakel won the silver medal. After that, Mirzoyan participated at International Student Games in 2008, winning the silver medal by lifting 312 kg in total.

Now competing as a senior, Arakel Mirzoyan lifted a total of 336 kg at the 2009 European Weightlifting Championships in Bucharest to become the European Champion. In the same year, he went to the 2009 World Weightlifting Championships in Goyang, where he lifted a total weight of 334 kg and won the silver medal, behind the reigning Olympic Champion Liao Hui. Arakel later claimed a hand injury prevented him from winning gold. In 2010, Mirzoyan changed his weight class and began performing in the weight category of 77 kg. He had to miss a number of championships in order to adjust to this new weight. At the 2011 World Championships in France, he took 10th place with a total weight of 338 kg. He returned to 69 kg sometime afterward.

He competed at the 2012 Summer Olympics. In a disappointing performance, Mirzoyan failed to register a total and dropped out of the competition. Weeks later, Armenian Weightlifting Federation President Samvel Khachatryan revealed Mirzoyan had been suffering from psychological problems, preventing him from competing to the fullest of his ability. In training, Khachatryan saw Mirzoyan lift 160 kilograms in snatch and 200 kilograms in clean and jerk. Khachatryan stated that he would not have allowed Mirzoyan to perform if he had been aware of his psychological problems. Mirzoyan himself later apologized to his fans for his defeat and promised to learn from his problems and give a better performance at the 2016 Rio Olympics.

He competed at the 2016 Summer Olympics, he competed in the light heavyweight category, but again failed to register a total.
