= Adrian Jigău =

Romanian weightlifter

Personal information
- Full name: Adrian Ioan Jigău
- Born: 6 January 1970 (age 56)
- Weight: 61.61 kg (135.8 lb)

Sport
- Country: Romania
- Sport: Weightlifting
- Weight class: 62 kg
- Team: National team
- Updated on 10 September 2016

Adrian Ioan Jigău (born 6 January 1970) is a Romanian male weightlifter, competing in the 62 kg category and representing Romania at international competitions. He competed at world championships, most recently at the 2006 World Weightlifting Championships.

== Major results ==
Year	Venue	Weight	Snatch (kg)				Clean & Jerk (kg)				Total	Rank
Year	Venue	Weight	1	2	3	Rank	1	2	3	Rank	Total	Rank
World Championships
2006	Santo Domingo, Dominican Republic	62 kg	123	127	~~130~~	12	152	~~156~~	~~156~~	14	279.0	13
2005	Doha, Qatar	62 kg	127	131	133	3rd place, bronze medalist(s)	156	159	~~162~~	6	292.0	3rd place, bronze medalist(s)
2003	Vancouver, Canada	56 kg	120	~~125~~	125	5	150	~~155~~	155	3rd place, bronze medalist(s)	280	2nd place, silver medalist(s)
2002	Warsaw, Poland	56 kg	120	125	~~127.5~~	3rd place, bronze medalist(s)	145	150	152.5	4	277.5	3rd place, bronze medalist(s)
1999	Piraeus, Greece	56 kg	125	~~127.5~~	~~127.5~~	3rd place, bronze medalist(s)	150	155	157.5	4	282.5	2nd place, silver medalist(s)
1998	Lahti, Finland	56 kg	117.5	~~122.5~~	~~122.5~~	6	~~145~~	145	~~155~~	5	262.5	5
