= Antoniu Buci =

Romanian weightlifter (born 1990)

Medal record

Men's Weightlifting

Representing Romania

European Championships
Silver medal – second place	2011 Kazan	62 kg

Antoniu Buci (born January 21, 1990, in Cluj-Napoca, Cluj) is a Romanian weightlifter.

At the 2006 World Championships he ranked 20th in the 56 kg category, with a total of 235 kg. At the 2007 World Championships he ranked 22nd in the 62 kg category, with a total of 272 kg.

He competed in Weightlifting at the 2008 Summer Olympics in the 62 kg division finishing fourth, with 295 kg, beating his previous personal best by 22 kg.

Buci recently won the silver medal at the 2011 European Weightlifting Championships held in Kazan, Russia.

He is 5 ft 3 inches tall and weighs 137 lb.
