= Mohamed Osman (weightlifter) =

Egyptian weightlifter

Personal information
- Full name: Mohamed Osman Ahmed
- Born: 1974 (age 51–52)
- Weight: 61.62 kg (135.8 lb)

Sport
- Country: Egypt
- Sport: Weightlifting
- Weight class: 62 kg
- Team: National team
- Updated on 13 September 2016

Mohamed Osman Ahmed (born 1974) is an Egyptian male weightlifter, competing in the 62 kg category and representing Egypt at international competitions. He competed at world championships, most recently at the 2003 World Weightlifting Championships.

== Major results ==
Year	Venue	Weight	Snatch (kg)				Clean & Jerk (kg)				Total	Rank
Year	Venue	Weight	1	2	3	Rank	1	2	3	Rank	Total	Rank
World Championships
2003	Vancouver, Canada	62 kg	122.5	~~127.5~~	~~127.5~~	14	~~152.5~~	~~152.5~~	~~152.5~~	---	0	---
1999	Piraeus, Greece	62 kg	~~115~~	115	~~117.5~~	35	~~150~~	150	152.5	20	267.5	24
1998	Lahti, Finland	62 kg	~~115~~	~~115~~	~~115~~	---	150	160	~~165~~	10	0	---
