= Liao Hui (weightlifter) =

Chinese weightlifter (born 1987)

Personal information
- Born: October 5, 1987 (age 38) Xiantao, Hubei, China
- Height: 1.68 m (5 ft 6 in)
- Weight: 69 kg (152 lb)

Sport
- Country: China
- Sport: Weightlifting
- Event: -69 kg
- Coached by: Yu Jie

Achievements and titles
- Personal bests: Snatch: 166 kg (2014, WR); Clean & Jerk:198 kg (2013, WR); Total: 359 kg (2014, WR)
Medal record
Men's Weightlifting
Representing China
Olympic Games
Gold medal – first place	2008 Beijing	–69 kg
World Championships
Gold medal – first place	2009 Goyang	–69 kg
Gold medal – first place	2013 Wrocław	–69 kg
Gold medal – first place	2014 Almaty	–69 kg
Disqualified	2010 Antalya	–69 kg

Liao Hui (simplified Chinese: 廖辉; traditional Chinese: 廖輝; pinyin: Liào Huī; born October 5, 1987, in Xiantao, Hubei) is a former Chinese weightlifter, Olympic champion and three-time world champion.

Before the International Weightlifting Federation reorganized the categories, he held all three world records in the 69 kg class.

== Career ==
In 2007 at the 6th Chinese City Games he broke two junior world records and won gold in the 69 kg class. At the 2008 Summer Olympics in Beijing he won the gold medal in the 69 kg class with a total of 348 kg. In 2009 and 2013 he won the World Weightlifting Championships. He also won the 2010 World Weightlifting Championships before being retroactively disqualified for performance-enhancing drug use the following year.

Liao became a member of the national weightlifting team in early 2007. After breaking two junior world records in 2007, he became a candidate for the Chinese national team at the 2008 Olympics after previously having been a backup for the 2012 Summer Olympics. He replaced Zhang Guozheng, the gold medalist in the 69 kg class at the 2004 Summer Olympics. Liao won the Olympic gold medal in the 69 kg class at the 2008 Olympics by lifting 158 kg in the snatch and 190 kg in the clean and jerk for a total of 348 kg.

Liao won the gold medal in the 69 kg class at the 2009 World Weightlifting Championships, achieving a 346 kg total.

At the 2010 World Weightlifting Championships, Liao placed first and broke the world records for both the clean and jerk and the total in the 69 kg class by lifting 198 kg and 358 kg, respectively. However, in November 2011, the International Weightlifting Federation announced that Liao had tested positive for the banned substances boldenone and androstatrienedione. As a result, the IWF subsequently disqualified Liao from the 2010 WWC, revoking his gold medals and invalidating his record-breaking lifts. Liao was initially banned from competition until September 30, 2014 but his ban was reduced to September, 2012 because it was a first time offense.

Liao competed for China in the 69 kg class at the 2013 World Weightlifting Championships, winning the gold with the highest snatch, clean and jerk, and total. He set new records in the snatch (166 kg (366 lb)) and total (359 kg (791 lb)) at the 2014 World Weightlifting Championships in Almaty, Kazakhstan. His performance at this competition, a total of 359 kg at 68.68 kg bodyweight, earned him a Sinclair of 478.56, the best to date from a Chinese weightlifter.

== Major results ==
Year	Venue	Weight	Snatch (kg)				Clean & Jerk (kg)				Total	Rank
Year	Venue	Weight	1	2	3	Rank	1	2	3	Rank	Total	Rank
Olympic Games
2008	Beijing, China	69 kg	~~153~~	153	158	1	~~185~~	185	190	1	348	1st place, gold medalist(s)
World Championships
2009	Goyang, South Korea	69 kg	155	160	~~166~~	1st place, gold medalist(s)	~~186~~	186	–	1st place, gold medalist(s)	346	1st place, gold medalist(s)
2010	Antalya, Turkey	69 kg	156	160	~~166~~	--	184	198	–	--	--	DSQ
2013	Wrocław, Poland	69 kg	155	160	~~166~~	1st place, gold medalist(s)	186	195	198 WR	1st place, gold medalist(s)	358 WR	1st place, gold medalist(s)
2014	Almaty, Kazakhstan	69 kg	155	~~160~~	166 WR	1st place, gold medalist(s)	185	193	–	1st place, gold medalist(s)	359 WR	1st place, gold medalist(s)
IWF Grand Prix
2015	Fuzhou, China	77 kg	~~160~~	160	170	1st place, gold medalist(s)	190	~~211~~	~~211~~	3rd place, bronze medalist(s)	360	1st place, gold medalist(s)
