= Ioan Veliciu =

Romanian weightlifter

Personal information
- Nationality: Romanian
- Born: 25 August 1985 (age 39); Arad, Romania

Sport
- Sport: Weightlifting

Ioan Veliciu (born 25 August 1985) is a Romanian weightlifter. He competed in the men's featherweight event at the 2004 Summer Olympics.
