= Naharudin Mahayudin =

Malaysian weightlifter

Naharudin Bin Mahayudin
Personal information
- Born: 30 January 1984 (age 41)
- Weight: 61.83 kg (136.3 lb)

Sport
- Country: Malaysia
- Sport: Weightlifting
- Weight class: 62 kg
- Team: National team
- Updated on 8 September 2016

Naharudin Bin Mahayudin (born 30 January 1984) is a Malaysian male weightlifter, competing in the 62 kg category and representing Malaysia at international competitions. He competed at world championships, most recently at the 2007 World Weightlifting Championships.

== Major results ==
Year	Venue	Weight	Snatch (kg)				Clean & Jerk (kg)				Total	Rank
Year	Venue	Weight	1	2	3	Rank	1	2	3	Rank	Total	Rank
World Championships
2007	Chiang Mai, Thailand	62 kg	116	120	125	17	145	~~150~~	~~150~~	30	270	25
