= Inmara Henríquez =

Venezuelan weightlifter

Personal information
- Born: 23 September 1981 (age 45) Naguanagua, Venezuela

Sport
- Sport: Weightlifting
Medal record
Representing Venezuela
Pan American Games
| Silver medal – second place | 2011 Guadalajara | 53kg |
South American Games
| Gold medal – first place | 2010 Medellin | 53kg |

Inmara Tibisay Henrriquez Gonzalez (born 23 September 1981) is a Venezuelan weightlifter. She competed at the 2012 Summer Olympics in the Women's 53 kg, finishing 10th.
