= Mohamed Abdelbaki =

Egyptian weightlifter (born 1987)

Personal information
- Full name: Mohamed Abdeltawwab Ibrahim Abdelbaki
- Born: 18 July 1987 (age 38)
- Weight: 68.50 kg (151.0 lb)

Sport
- Country: Egypt
- Sport: Weightlifting
- Team: National team
- Updated on 6 September 2016

Mohamed Abdeltawwab Ibrahim Abdelbaki (born 18 July 1987) is an Egyptian male weightlifter, competing in the 69 kg category and representing Egypt at international competitions. He participated in Weightlifting at the 2008 Summer Olympics in the 62 kg division finishing eighth, with 288 kg, beating his previous personal best by 2 kg. He competed at world championships, most recently at the 2011 World Weightlifting Championships.

== Major results ==
Year	Venue	Weight	Snatch (kg)				Clean & Jerk (kg)				Total	Rank
Year	Venue	Weight	1	2	3	Rank	1	2	3	Rank	Total	Rank
World Championships
2011	Paris, France	69 kg	~~140~~	140	144	9	170	175	177	9	321	8
2010	Antalya, Turkey	69 kg	140	143	~~146~~	8	~~172~~	~~172~~	~~173~~	---	0	---
2009	Goyang, South Korea	69 kg	141	~~144~~	~~144~~	8	~~170~~	172	~~177~~	8	313	7
2007	Chiang Mai, Thailand	62 kg	125	127	~~130~~	12	153	~~157~~	157	13	284	12
2006	Santo Domingo, Dominican Republic	62 kg	127	131	~~133~~	6	~~155~~	155	~~158~~	12	286.0	8
2003	Vancouver, Canada	56 kg	100	105	~~107.5~~	21	122.5	~~127.5~~	~~127.5~~	28	227.5	26
