= Alberto Baldé =

Dominican Republic footballer

Personal information
- Full name: Alberto Baldé Almánzar
- Date of birth: 21 March 2002 (age 24)
- Place of birth: Madrid, Spain
- Position: Forward

Team information
- Current team: Annagh
- Number: 10

Youth career
- 2014–2017: Portadown

Senior career*
Years	Team	Apps	(Gls)
2017–2018	Portadown	4	(1)
2018–2022	Middlesbrough	0	(0)
2021	→ Pickering Town (loan)	0	(0)
2022–2023	Portadown	29	(1)
2023–2025	Loughgall	50	(0)
2025–	Annagh	25	(2)

International career^{‡}
2017	Northern Ireland U15	2	(0)
2017	Northern Ireland U16	9	(4)
2023	Dominican Republic U23	2	(0)
2022–	Dominican Republic	2	(0)
- * Club domestic league appearances and goals as of 26 April 2026 ‡ National team caps and goals as of 09:34, 1 July 2025 (UTC)

Alberto Baldé Almánzar (born 21 March 2002) is a professional footballer who plays as a forward for NIFL Championship side Annagh. Born in Spain and raised in Northern Ireland, he plays for the Dominican Republic national team.

== Early life ==
Baldé was born in Madrid, Spain to a Bissau-Guinean father and an Afro-Dominican mother. He moved to Northern Ireland with his mother at a young age.

== Club career ==
Baldé joined the youth academy of the Northern Ireland club Portadown at the age of 12 when he knew no English, and gained national attention as the focus of a Google advertisement highlighting how his coaches used Google Translate to communicate with him. At 15, he became their youngest ever goalscorer in a 2–1 NIFL Championship win over Knockbreda. He joined Middlesbrough's reserves in 2018. He briefly joined non-league club Pickering Town on loan in November 2021. He was released by Middlesbrough when his contract ended in June 2022, and rejoined Portadown.

== International career ==
Baldé is a youth international for the Northern Ireland U15s and Northern Ireland U16s in 2017. He was called up to the Dominican Republic national team for matches in June 2022. He debuted with the Dominican Republic in a 3–2 CONCACAF Nations League loss to French Guiana on 5 June 2022, coming on as a substitute in the 67th minute.
