= Chinthana Vidanage =

Sri Lankan weightlifter

Personal information
- Full name: Chinthana Geetal Vidanage Vidanage
- Nationality: Sri Lankan
- Born: 31 December 1981 (age 44) Polonnaruwa, Sri Lanka
- Weight: 68.81 kg (151.7 lb)

Sport
- Country: Sri Lanka
- Sport: Weightlifting
- Weight class: 69 kg
- Team: National team
Medal record
Men's weightlifting
Representing Sri Lanka
Commonwealth Games
Gold medal – first place	2006 Melbourne	62 kg
Silver medal – second place	2010 Delhi	69 kg
Commonwealth Championships
Bronze medal – third place	2021 Tashkent	81 kg
- Updated on 2 January 2022

Chinthana Geetal Vidanage (born 31 December 1981) is a Sri Lankan weightlifter. He won a gold medal in the men's 62 kg category weightlifting; the first weightlifting gold medal for Sri Lanka in the 2006 Commonwealth Games held in Melbourne, Australia. In, 2011 Vidanage was banned for four years for violating anti-doping rules.

He was born in Polonnaruwa. Vidanage was a student of Polonnaruwa Royal Central College.

Vidanage has qualified to compete for Sri Lanka at the 2022 Commonwealth Games in Birmingham, England.

== Drugs ==
A urine sample provided by Vidanage in April 2011 at the 2011 Asian Weightlifting Championships in China was found to have metabolites of two methylhexanamine, which is banned by the World Anti-Doping Agency. Vidanage admitted taking the drug "unknowingly". The International Weightlifting Federation subsequently banned him for four years.

== See also ==
- List of Sri Lankans by sport
