= Sardar Hasanov =

Azerbaijani weightlifter

Sardar Hasanov (born May 12, 1985 in Baku, Azerbaijan Soviet Socialist Republic) is an Azerbaijani weightlifter. His personal best is 280 kg.

At the 2007 World Championships he ranked 14th in the 62 kg category, with a total of 280 kg. At the 2008 European Weightlifting Championships he ranked fifth in the 62 kg category, with a total of 275 kg.

He competed in weightlifting at the 2008 Summer Olympics in the 62 kg division but did not finish. In 2016 he was disqualified from the 2008 Olympics for doping, and his result was annulled after his 2008 sample was re-tested and failed.

At the 2012 Summer Olympics, Hasanov moved up to the lightweight (-69 kg) division. He finished in 8th place, lifting 176 kg in the clean and jerk and 145 kg in the snatch for a total of 321 kg.

He is 5 ft 3 inches tall and weighs 137 lb.
