= Henadzi Makhveyenia =

Belarusian weightlifter (born 1983)

Personal information
- Born: December 10, 1983 (age 42) Dubrowna, Vitebsk, Belarus SSR, Soviet Union
Medal record
Men's weightlifting
Representing Belarus
European Championships
Silver medal – second place	2007 Strasbourg	– 62 kg
Bronze medal – third place	2006 Władysławowo	– 62 kg

Henadzy Makhveyenia (born December 10, 1983), also known as Gennady Makhveyenya, is a Belarusian weightlifter. His personal best combined total is 290 kg.

At the 2006 and 2007 European Weightlifting Championships he won overall silver in the 62 kg category, both times winning gold medals in the snatch.

He competed in Weightlifting at the 2008 Summer Olympics in the 62 kg division finishing tenth, with 278 kg.
