= Kamran Panjavi =

British weightlifter

Kamran Panjavi (Persian: کامران پنجوی, born 6 February 1975) is a British-Iranian weightlifter. Born in Iran, he emigrated to the United Kingdom in 1997 and waited several years for citizenship.

At the 2003 World Weightlifting Championships he participated for Great Britain as soon as he obtained his citizenship.

He qualified for Olympic 2004 at the 2004 European Weightlifting Championships in Ukraine, with a total of 255 kg ( the only male lifter) . He competed for Great Britain at the 2004 Summer Olympics, but did not finish due to a back injury.

At the 2005 European Weightlifting Championships he ranked 8th with a total of 260 kg. At the 2005 Commonwealth Championship in Melbourne, Australia he ranked 1st with a total of 261 kg. In 2017 after recovering from back injury, he owns a driving school helping people become safe drivers and is a personal trainer
