= Henadzi Aliashchuk =

Soviet weightlifter (born 1975)

Personal information
- Native name: Геннадий Юрьевич Олещук
- Full name: Henadzi Yurievich Aliashchuk
- Born: 29 June 1975 (age 50) Babruysk, Byelorussian SSR, Soviet Union
Medal record
Men's weightlifting
Representing Belarus
Olympic Games
Bronze medal – third place	2000 Sydney	– 62 kg
World Championships
Gold medal – first place	2001 Antalya	– 62 kg
European Championships
Bronze medal – third place	2003 Loutraki	– 62 kg

Henadzi Yurievich Aliashchuk also written as Gennady Oleshchuk (Russian: Геннадий Олещук; born 29 June 1975) is a former weightlifter from Belarus, who competed in the men's featherweight class weight (– 62 kg) at the 2000 Summer Olympics and won a bronze medal. He was born in Babruysk. He set the world record for the men's 62 kg category in 2001, lifting 181 kg.
