= Bakhram Mendibaev =

Uzbekistani weightlifter (born 1983)

Bakhram Mendibaev (born 27 August 1983) is an Uzbekistani weightlifter. He competed for Uzbekistan at the 2012 Summer Olympics.

In 2013 Mendibaev was suspended for two years for using the banned substance stanozolol.
