= Tolkunbek Hudaýbergenow =

Turkmenistani weightlifter

Personal information
- Nationality: Turkmen
- Born: 4 January 1986 (age 40)
- Height: 1.60 m (5 ft 3 in)
- Weight: 68 kg (150 lb)

Sport
- Sport: Weightlifting
- Event: 69 kg
Medal record
Representing Turkmenistan
Men's weightlifting
- Updated on 22 August 2018

Tolkunbek Hudaybergenov (born January 4, 1986) is a Turkmen weightlifter. He was born in the Gurbansoltan Eje district, Daşoguz Region.

At the 2008 Asian Championships he won the bronze medal in the clean and jerk in the 62 kg category, overall ranking 4th with a total of 284 kilograms (626 lb).

He competed in Weightlifting at the 2008 Summer Olympics in the 62 kg division finishing seventh, with 288 kilograms (635 lb), beating his previous personal best by 4 kilograms (8.8 lb).

== Major results ==
| Year | Venue | Weight | Snatch (kg) | | | | Clean & Jerk (kg) | | | | Total | Rank |
| Year | Venue | Weight | 1 | 2 | 3 | Rank | 1 | 2 | 3 | Rank | Total | Rank |
Representing Turkmenistan
Olympic Games
| 2008 | Beijing, China | 62 kg | ~~126~~ | 126 | ~~131~~ | 13 | 162 | ~~170~~ | ~~170~~ | 7 | 288 | 7 |
World Championships
| 2011 | Paris, France | 69 kg | 130 | 135 | 138 | 21 | 169 | 175 | ~~180~~ | 15 | 313 | 14 |
| 2010 | Antalya, Turkey | 69 kg | ~~130~~ | ~~130~~ | ~~130~~ | — | — | — | — | — | — | — |
| 2007 | Chiang Mai, Thailand | 62 kg | 120 | ~~125~~ | ~~125~~ | 30 | 151 | 156 | ~~160~~ | 14 | 276 | 18 |
| 2006 | Santo Domingo, Dominican Republic | 62 kg | 115 | 121 | ~~125~~ | 18 | 150 | ~~155~~ | 155 | 8 | 276 | 15 |
| 2003 | Vancouver, Canada | 56 kg | 105.0 | ~~110.0~~ | ~~110.0~~ | 23 | 130.0 | 135.0 | ~~140.0~~ | 19 | 240.0 | 21 |
