= Triyatno =

Indonesian weightlifter (born 1987)

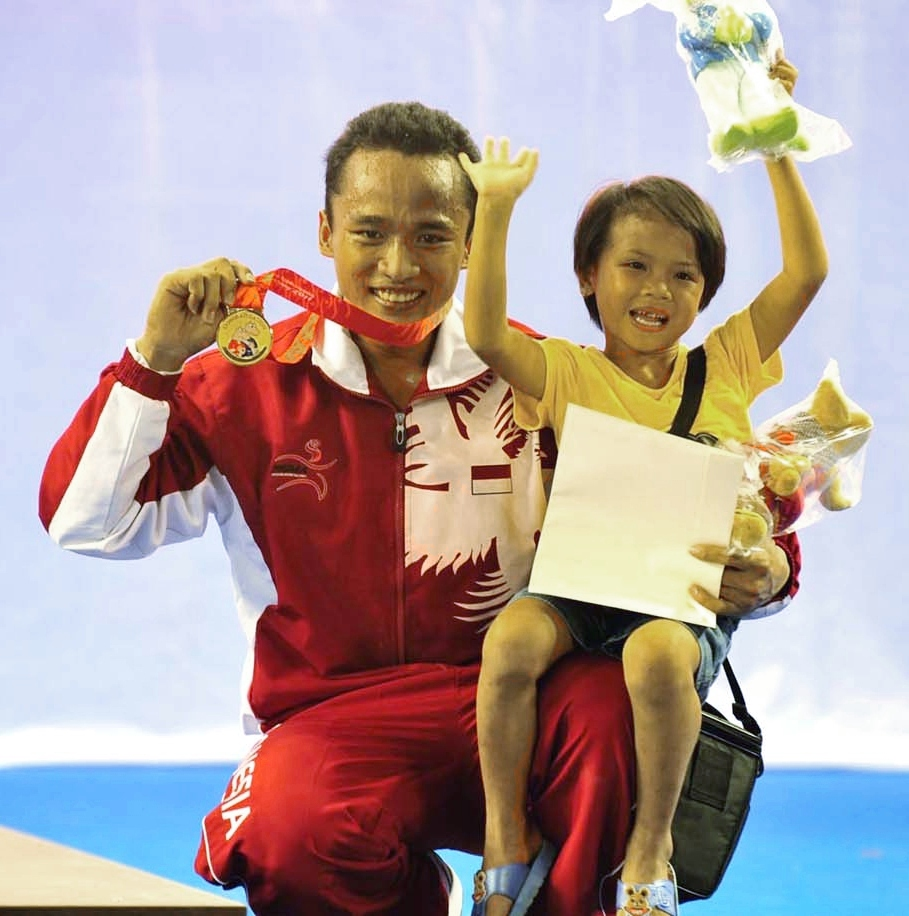
- Triyatno in 2011

Personal information
- Born: 20 December 1987 (age 38) Metro, Lampung, Indonesia
- Height: 1.62 m (5 ft 4 in)
- Weight: 69 kg (152 lb)
- Spouse: Riska Anjani Yasin (m. 2012)

Sport
- Sport: Weightlifting
Medal record
Men's Weightlifting
Representing Indonesia
Olympic Games
| Silver medal – second place | 2012 London | 69 kg |
| Bronze medal – third place | 2008 Beijing | 62 kg |
World Championships
| Bronze medal – third place | 2009 Goyang | 69 kg |
| Bronze medal – third place | 2010 Antalya | 69 kg |
Asian Games
| Bronze medal – third place | 2010 Guangzhou | 69 kg |
Asian Championships
| Gold medal – first place | 2009 Taldykorgan | 69 kg |
SEA Games
| Gold medal – first place | 2007 Nakhon Ratchasima | 62 kg |
| Gold medal – first place | 2009 Vientiane | 69 kg |
| Gold medal – first place | 2011 Jakarta–Palembang | 69 kg |
International Fajr Cup
| Gold medal – first place | 2020 Tehran | 73 kg |
Junior World Championships
| Bronze medal – third place | 2006 Hangzhou | 62 kg |
| Bronze medal – third place | 2007 Prague | 62 kg |

Triyatno (born 20 December 1987) is an Indonesian weightlifter. He competed at the 2008, 2012, and 2016 Summer Olympics and won a silver and a bronze medal.

== Career ==
At the 2006 Junior World Championships he won the bronze medal in the 62 kg category. He won the bronze medal again at the 2007 Junior World Championships in the same category.

He ranked 9th at the 2006 World Weightlifting Championships in the 62 kg category, and was 7th at the 2007 World Weightlifting Championships in the same category.

Triyatno competed in the 69 kg category at the 2008 Asian Weightlifting Championships, ranking 4th with a total of 300 kg. He won the bronze medal at the 2008 Summer Olympics in the 62 kg category, lifting a total of 298 kg. He won the bronze medal in the 69 kg category at the 2009 World Weightlifting Championships, with 330 kg in total.

At the 2012 Summer Olympics Triyatno won the silver medal with a total of 333 kg in the 69 kg category. He lifted only 317 kg at the 2016 Summer Olympics and placed ninth.

== Personal life ==
Triyatno married Riska Anjani Yasin, elder sister of the 2024 Paris Olympics gold medalist, Rizki Juniansyah.

== Awards and nominations ==
| Award | Year | Category | Result | Ref. |
|---|---|---|---|---|
| AORI | 2012 | Best Athlete | Won | |
| KONI Award | 2013 | Best Athlete | Won | |
| SIWO PWI Award | 2026 | Best coach | Won | |
