= Diego Salazar =

Colombian weightlifter (born 1980)

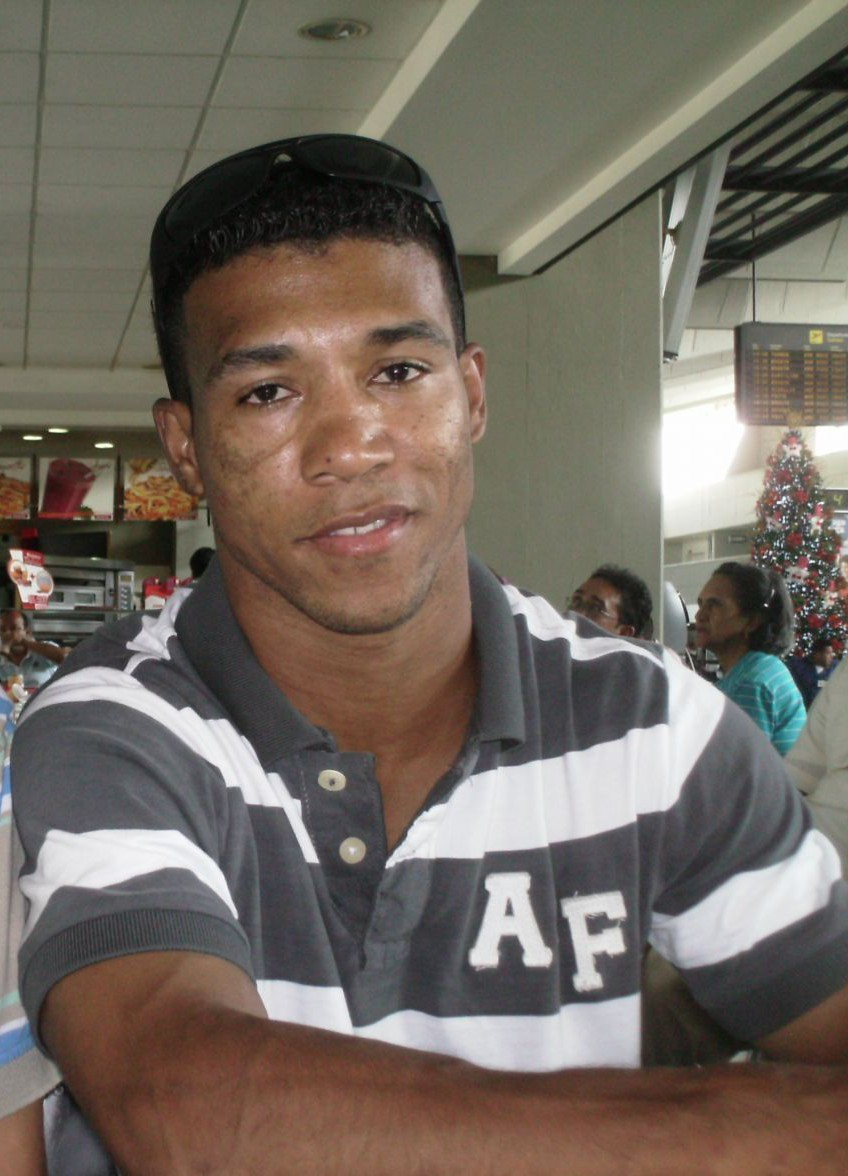

Personal information
- Born: 3 October 1980 (age 45) Barranquilla, Colombia
Medal record
Representing Colombia
Men's weightlifting
Olympic Games
Silver medal – second place	2008 Beijing	– 62 kg
World Championships
Bronze medal – third place	2006 Santo Domingo	– 62 kg
Pan American Games
Gold medal – first place	2003 Santo Domingo	– 62 kg
Gold medal – first place	2007 Rio de Janeiro	– 62 kg
Bronze medal – third place	2011 Guadalajara	– 62 kg
Pan American Championships
Silver medal – second place	2008 Callao	– 62 kg
Silver medal – second place	2010 Guatemala City	– 62 kg
Central American and Caribbean Games
Bronze medal – third place	2006 Cartagena	– 62 kg

Diego Fernando Salazar Quintero (born 3 October 1980) is a Colombian weightlifter, Olympic medalist and two times gold medal winner at the Pan American Games. He was born in Barranquilla.

Salazar participated in the men's -62 kg class at the 2006 World Weightlifting Championships and won the bronze medal, finishing behind Qiu Le and Oscar Figueroa. He snatched 131 kg and clean and jerked an additional 164 kg for a total of 295 kg, 13 kg behind winner Qiu.

He ranked sixth in the 62 kg category at the 2007 World Weightlifting Championships, lifting a total of 293 kg.

At the 2008 Pan American Weightlifting Championships he won the silver medal in the 62 kg category, lifting 302 kg in total.

== 2008 Summer Olympics performance ==
Salazar won a silver medal at the 2008 Summer Olympics behind China's Zhan Xiangxiang. Salazar lifted 167 kg and took the silver medal with a total weight of 305 kg.
