= Israel José Rubio =

Venezuelan weightlifter (born 1981)

Personal information
- Born: 11 January 1981 (age 45)
Medal record
Men's Weightlifting
Representing Venezuela
Olympic Games
Bronze medal – third place	2004 Athens	– 62 kg
Pan American Games
Gold medal – first place	2011 Guadalajara	– 69 kg
Bronze medal – third place	2003 Santo Domingo	– 62 kg
South American Games
Gold medal – first place	2010 Medellín	– 69 kg

Israel José Rubio Rivero (born 11 January 1981) is a Venezuelan weightlifter.

Rubio originally placed 4th in the men's 62kg weightlifting competition at the 2004 Summer Olympics in Athens, Greece, but was moved to third place and received a bronze medal when the previous bronze medalist, Leonidas Sampanis, was stripped of his medal following a doping scandal.

At the 2008 Summer Olympics he ranked 13th in the men's 69kg weightlifting competition, lifting a total of 306 kg.

Rubio was arrested on January 25, 2012, in the city of Pescara, Italy, for alleged possession of narcotics.
