= Vladimir Popov (weightlifter) =

Moldovan weightlifter (born 1977)

Personal information
- Born: 23 January 1977 (age 49) Cahul, Moldovan SSR, Soviet Union
Medal record
Men's Weightlifting
Representing Moldova
European Championships
Bronze medal – third place	2001 Trenčín	– 62 kg

Vladimir Popov (born 23 January 1977) is a former male weightlifter from Moldova. He competed in two consecutive Summer Olympics for his native Eastern European country, starting in 1996. He is best known for winning the bronze medal in the men's featherweight division (– 62 kg) at the 2001 European Championships in Trenčín, Slovakia.

Popov was banned twice by the International Weightlifting Federation (IWF), in 2005 and 2008, for doping violation. It is believed that he is banned for life.
