= Elkhan Suleymanov =

Azerbaijani weightlifter (born 1974)

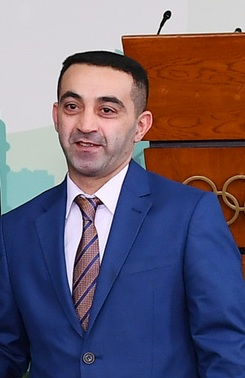
- Elkhan Suleymanov in 2019

Personal information
- Nationality: Azerbaijani
- Born: 2 February 1974 (age 51)

Sport
- Sport: Weightlifting

Elkhan Suleymanov (born 2 February 1974), also known as Elxan Süleymanov, is an Azerbaijani weightlifter. He competed in the men's featherweight event at the 2000 Summer Olympics.
