= Yang Sheng-hsiung =

Taiwanese weightlifter (born 1983)

Yang Sheng-Hsiung
Personal information
- Nationality: Republic of China
- Born: 1 June 1983 (age 43)
- Height: 1.58 m (5 ft 2 in)
- Weight: 62 kg (137 lb)

Sport
- Sport: Weightlifting
- Event: 62 kg
Medal record
Representing Chinese Taipei
Men's weightlifting
East Asian Games
Silver medal – second place	2009 Hong Kong	62 kg

Yang Sheng-Hsiung (Chinese: 杨胜雄; pinyin: Yáng Shèngxióng; born June 1, 1983) is a Taiwanese weightlifter. He represented Chinese Taipei at two Olympic games, and had won a silver medal for the featherweight category (62 kg) at the 2009 East Asian Games in Hong Kong, China.

At the 2004 Summer Olympics in Athens, Yang placed ninth in the men's 62-kg class, by lifting a total of 280 kg. He repeated his position for the same category at the 2008 Summer Olympics in Beijing, with a snatch of 130 kg, and a clean and jerk of 157 kg, to combine a total of 287 kg.
