= Qiu Le =

Chinese weightlifter (born 1983)

Personal information
- Born: 26 February 1983 (age 43)
Medal record
Men's Weightlifting
Representing China
World Championships
Gold medal – first place	2005 Doha	– 62 kg
Gold medal – first place	2006 Santo Domingo	– 62 kg

Qiu Le (born 26 February 1983) is a Chinese weightlifter.

Qiu participated in the men's -62 kg class at the 2006 World Weightlifting Championships and won the gold medal, snatching 140 kg and jerking an additional 168 kg for a total of 308 kg.

Qiu competed in the men's -62 kg class at the 2005 World Weightlifting Championships and won the gold medal, snatching 144 kg and jerking 178 kg for a total of 322 kg.
