= Weightlifting at the 2008 Summer Olympics – Qualification =

== Qualifying criteria ==
A total of 260 athletes will be competing in the weightlifting events at the 2008 Summer Olympics in Beijing, People's Republic of China.

=== Host nation ===
The host nation shall directly qualify 6 men's and 4 women's places.

=== World championships ===
NOCs will achieve qualification places according to their position in the joint team classification by points adding those scored in the 2006 and in the 2007 World Championships, whereby points achieved in the 2007 World Championships team classification must be multiplied by 1.2.

Men:

- 1st to 6th - 6 athletes
- 7th to 13th - 5 athletes
- 14th to 20th - 4 athletes
- 21st to 27th - 3 athletes

Women:

- 1st to 9th - 4 athletes
- 10th to 14th - 3 athletes
- 15th to 17th - 2 athletes

=== Continental championships ===
Continental qualification events will be held for each continent, at which only NOCs which have not gained qualification places in the 2006 and 2007 World Championships may win qualification places.

Men:

- Africa:
  - 1st - 2 athletes
  - 2nd to 4th - 1 athlete
- America:
  - 1st to 2nd - 2 athletes
  - 3rd to 5th - 1 athlete
- Asia:
  - 1st to 2nd - 2 athletes
  - 3rd to 5th - 1 athlete
- Europe:
  - 1st to 2nd - 2 athletes
  - 3rd to 5th - 1 athlete
- Oceania:
  - 1st - 2 athletes
  - 2nd to 3rd - 1 athlete

Women:

- Africa:
  - 1st to 3rd - 1 athlete
- America:
  - 1st to 4th - 1 athlete
- Asia:
  - 1st to 4th - 1 athlete
- Europe:
  - 1st - 2 athletes
  - 2nd to 3rd - 1 athlete
- Oceania:
  - 1st to 3rd - 1 athlete

=== Individual qualification ===
15 places (8 for men and 7 for women) will be allocated based on the Olympic Qualification Ranking List established by 31 May 2008. Individual qualification places will be allocated to the athletes, ranked in the top 15 places (men), or top 10 places (women) in each bodyweight category, from NOCs which have not gained any qualification places through the 2006 and 2007 World Championships or Continental Qualification Events. Individual Qualification is attributed by name to the respective athlete, who may participate in the Olympic Games only in the same weight category in which he achieved the qualification place. An NOC may qualify a maximum of 1 (one) male and 1 (one) female weightlifter under the criteria of individual qualification. Should more than 1 (one) athlete from an NOC achieve qualification under these criteria, the NOC must determine which place will be used.

=== Tripartite commission ===
The Tripartite Commission shall, on the basis of requests submitted by the NOCs and in consultation, allocate a total of 10 (ten) Invitation places to NOCs, in a gender proportion of approximately 6 (six) men and 4 (four) women.

=== Reallocation of unused quotas ===
If an NOC chooses not to use all qualification places obtained, or if individual qualification places cannot be allocated, the qualification places concerned shall be reallocated by the IWF with consideration to the Olympic Qualification Ranking List.

== Qualification timeline ==
Event	Date	Venue
2006 World Championships	Sep 29 - Oct 7, 2006	(Dominican Republic) Santo Domingo
2007 World Championships	September 15–24, 2007	(Thailand) Chiang Mai
2008 African Championships	May 12–15, 2008	(South Africa) Strand
2008 Asian Championships	Apr 27 - May 1, 2008	(Japan) Kanazawa
2008 European Championships	April 14–20, 2008	(Italy) Lignano Sabbiadoro
2008 Pan American Championships	March 19–23, 2008	(Peru) Callao
2008 Oceania Championships	March 28–30, 2008	(New Zealand) Auckland

== Qualifiers ==
=== Men ===
Rank	NOC	Quotas	Nominated Athletes
Host Nation
	China	6	Long Qingquan (56), Zhang Xiangxiang (62), Liao Hui (69), Shi Zhiyong (69), Li Hongli (77), Lu Yong (85),
World Championships
1	Russia	6	Oleg Perepetchenov (77), Roman Konstantinov (94), Khadzhimurat Akkaev (94), Dmitry Lapikov (105), Dmitriy Klokov (105), Evgeny Chigishev (+105)
2	Belarus	6	Vitali Dzerbianiou (56), Henadzi Makhveyenia (62), Siarhei Lahun (77), Andrei Rybakou (85), Vadzim Straltsou (85), Andrei Aramnau (105)
3	Cuba	6	Sergio Alvarez Boulet (56), Lázaro Maikel Ruiz (62), Yordanis Borrero (69), Iván Cambar (77), Jadiel Valladares (85), Yohandris Hernández (94)
4	Bulgaria	0	
5	Poland	6	Krzysztof Szramiak (77), Bartłomiej Bonk (94), Szymon Kołecki (94), Robert Dołęga (105), Marcin Dołęga (105), Grzegorz Kleszcz (+105)
6	Colombia	6	Sergio Rada (56), Oscar Figueroa (62), Diego Fernando Salazar (62), Edwin Mosquera (69), Luis Miguel Pineda (69), Carlos Andica (85)
7	South Korea	5	Ji Hun-Min (62), Lee Bae-Young (69), Kim Kwang-Hoon (77), Sa Jae-Hyouk (77), Jeon Sang-Guen (+105)
8	Ukraine	5	Artem Ivanov (94), Igor Razoronov (105), Oleksiy Torokhtiy (105), Ihor Shymechko (+105), Artem Udachyn (+105)
9	Armenia	5	Tigran G. Martirosyan (69), Gevorg Davtyan (77), Ara Khachatryan (77), Tigran V. Martirosyan (85), Edgar Gevorgyan (85)
10	Moldova	5	Igor Grabucea (56), Alexandru Dudoglo (69), Andrei Gutu (77), Evgheni Bratan (94), Vadim Vacarciuc (94)
11	Greece	3	Konstantinos Gkaripis (94), Anastasios Triantafyllou (94), Nikolaos Kourtidis (105)
12	Kazakhstan	5	Vladimir Kuznetsov (77), Vladimir Sedov (85), Ilya Ilyin (94), Bakhyt Akhmetov (105), Sergey Istomin (105)
13	Azerbaijan	5	Sardar Hasanov (62), Afgan Bayramov (69), Turan Mirzayev (69), Intigam Zairov (85), Nizami Pashayev (94)
14	Germany	4	Artiom Shaloyan (69), Jürgen Spiess (94), Matthias Steiner (+105), Almir Velagic (+105)
15	Egypt	4	Mohamed Abd Elbaki (62), Tarek Abdelazim (69), Mahmoud Elhaddad (77), Abdelrahman El Sayed (105)
16	Venezuela	4	Israel José Rubio (69), Ocando Jose Leonardo (77), Octavio Antonio Mejias (77), Herbys Charlys Marquez (85)
17	Turkey	4	Sedat Artuç (56), Taner Sağır (77), İzzet İnce (85), Bunyamin Sudas (105)
18	North Korea	4	Cha Kum-Chol (56), Ri Kyong-Sok (56), Im Yong-Su (62), Kim Chol-Jin (69)
19	Romania	4	Antoniu Buci (62), Răzvan Martin (69), Alexandru Roșu (69), Răzvan Rusu (77)
20	Indonesia	4	Eko Yuli Irawan (56), Triyatno (62), Edi Kurniawan (69), Sandou Nasution (77)
21	Thailand	3	Pongsak Maneetong (56), Phaisan Hansawong (62), Sittisak Suphalak (69)
22	Iran	3	Asghar Ebrahimi (94), Mohsen Beiranvand (105), Rashid Sharifi (+105)
23	France	3	Vencelas Dabaya (69), Giovanni Bardis (77), Benjamin Hennequin (85)
24	Georgia	3	Rauli Tsirekidse (85), Arsen Kasabiev (94), Albert Kuzilov (105)
25	Japan	3	Yasunobu Sekikawa (56), Masaharu Yamada (56), Yoshito Shintani (69)
26	Italy	3	Vito Dellino (56), Giorgio de Luca (69), Moreno Boer (105)
27	Chinese Taipei	3	Yang Chin-Yi (56), Wang Shin-Yuan (56), Yang Sheng-Hsiung (62)
African Championships
1	Nigeria	2	Felix Ekpo (77), Benedict Uloko (85)
2	Cameroon	1	Brice Vivien Batchaya (85)
3	Tunisia	1	Khalil El Maaoui (56)
4	South Africa	1	Darryn Anthony (77)
American Championships
1	United States	2	Chad Vaughn (77), Kendrick Farris (85)
2	Canada	2	Jasvir Singh (62), Francis Luna-Grenier (69)
3	Brazil	1	Wellison Silva (69)
4	Argentina	1	Carlos Espeleta (77)
5	Ecuador	1	Eduardo Guadamud (94)
Asian Championships
1	Uzbekistan	2	Sherzodjon Yusupov (77), Mansurbek Chashemov (85)
2	Turkmenistan	2	Umurbek Bazarbayev (62), Tolkunbek Hudaybergenov (62)
3	Kyrgyzstan	1	Ulanbek Moldodosov (85)
4	Saudi Arabia	0	~~Ali Hussein Al-Dhilab (69)~~
5	Iraq	0	~~Sawara Mohammed (69)~~
European Championships
1	Albania	2	Gert Trasha (69), Erkand Qerimaj (77)
2	Slovakia	2	Ondrej Kutlík (85), Martin Tešovič (105)
3	Hungary	1	János Baranyai (77)
4	Lithuania	1	Ramūnas Vyšniauskas (105)
5	Spain	1	José Juan Navarro (94)
Oceania Championships
1	New Zealand	2	Mark Spooner (69), Richie Patterson (77)
2	Australia	1	Damon Kelly (+105)
3	Nauru	1	Itte Detenamo (+105)

=== Women ===
Rank	NOC	Quotas	Nominated Athletes
Host Nation
	China	4	Chen Xiexia (48), Chen Yanqing (58), Liu Chunhong (69), Cao Lei (75)
World Championships
1	Russia	4	Marina Shainova (58), Svetlana Tsarukaeva (63), Oxana Slivenko (69), Nadezhda Evstyukhina (75)
2	Thailand	4	Pramsiri Bunphithak (48), Pensiri Laosirikul (48), Prapawadee Jaroenrattanatarakoon (53), Wandee Kameaim (58)
3	South Korea	4	Im Jyoung-Hwa (48), Yoon Jin-Hee (53), Kim Soo-Kyung (63), Jang Mi-Ran (+75)
4	Ukraine	4	Natalya Davydova (69), Nadiya Myronyuk (75), Yuliya Dovhal (+75), Olha Korobka (+75)
5	Colombia	4	Mercedes Pérez (63), Tulia Angela Medina (69), Leydi Solís (69), Ubaldina Valoyes (75)
6	Poland	4	Marzena Karpińska (48), Marieta Gotfryd (58), Aleksandra Klejnowska (58), Dominika Misterska (63)
7	Belarus	4	Nastassia Novikava (53), Hanna Batsiushka (69), Iryna Kulesha (75), Yuliya Novakovich (75)
8	United States	4	Melanie Roach (53), Carissa Gump (63), Natalie Woolfolk (63), Cheryl Haworth (+75)
9	Kazakhstan	4	Maya Maneza (63), Irina Nekrassova (63), Alla Vazhenina (75), Mariya Grabovetskaya (+75)
10	Japan	3	Hiromi Miyake (48), Misaki Oshiro (48), Rika Saito (69)
11	Venezuela	3	Judith Chacon (53), Solenny Villasmil (63), Iriner Jimenez (69)
12	Greece	1	Victoria Mavridou (+75)
13	North Korea	3	O Jong-Ae (58), Pak Hyon-Suk (63), Hong Yong-Ok (69)
14	Canada	3	Marilou Dozois-Prevost (48), Christine Girard (63), Jean Elisabeth Lassen (75)
15	Bulgaria	0	
16	Mexico	2	Luz Acosta (63), Damaris Aguirre (75)
17	Chinese Taipei	2	Chen Wei-ling (48), Lu Ying-chi (63)
African Championships
1	Nigeria	1	Maryam Usman (+75)
2	Egypt	1	Abir Khalil (69)
3	Tunisia	1	Hanene Ourfelli (63)
American Championships
1	Ecuador	1	Alexandra Escobar (58)
2	Puerto Rico	1	Geralee Vega (58)
3	Dominican Republic	1	Yudelquis Maridalin (53)
4	El Salvador	1	Eva Dimas (+75)
Asian Championships
1	Indonesia	1	Raema Lisa Rumbewas (53)
2	Vietnam	1	Nguyen Thi Thiet (63)
3	Mongolia	1	Namkhaidorjiin Bayarmaa (63)
4	India	0	~~Laishram Monika Devi (69)~~
European Championships
1	Turkey	2	Sibel Özkan (48), Nurcan Taylan (48)
2	Germany	1	Julia Rohde (53)
3	France	1	Mélanie Noël (48)
Oceania Championships
1	Australia	1	Deborah Lovely (+75)
2	Papua New Guinea	1	Dika Toua (53)
3	Samoa	1	Ele Opeloge (+75)

=== Individual qualification ===
No.	Name	NOC	Weight	Record
Men
1	Hoang Anh Tuan	Vietnam	56	279
2	Amirul Hamizan Ibrahim	Malaysia	56	262
3	Manuel Minginfel	Federated States of Micronesia	62	293
4	Dimitrios Minasidis	Cyprus	69	305
5	Ahed Joughili	Syria	105	387
6	Viktors Ščerbatihs	Latvia	+105	447
7	~~Jaber Saeed Salem~~	Qatar	+105	435
8	Did not allocate			
Women
1	Genny Pagliaro	Italy	48	194
2	~~Yu Weili~~	Hong Kong	53	205
3	Romela Begaj	Albania	58	212
4	Roxana Cocoş	Romania	58	209
5	Ruth Kasirye	Norway	63	222
6	Hripsime Khurshudyan	Armenia	75	250
7	Lydia Valentin	Spain	75	245

=== Tripartite commission invitations and reallocation of unused quotas ===
No.	Name	NOC	Weight
Men
1	Tom Goegebuer	Belgium	56
2	~~Mubarak Kivumbi~~	Uganda	56
3	Chinthana Vidanage	Sri Lanka	69
4	Kamal Bahadur Adhikari	Nepal	69
5	Logona Esau	Tuvalu	69
6	Nizom Sangov	Tajikistan	69
7	Josefa Vueti	Fiji	77
8	Romain Marchessou	Monaco	77
9	David Katoatau	Kiribati	85
10	Terrence Dixie	Seychelles	85
11	Ravi Bhollah	Mauritius	94
12	Libor Wälzer	Czech Republic	105
13	Christian Lopez	Guatemala	105
14	Antti Everi	Finland	+105
15	Maamaloa Lolohea	Tonga	+105
16	Sam Pera Junior	Cook Islands	+105
Women
17	Karla Moreno	Nicaragua	48
18	Hidilyn Diaz	Philippines	58
19	Wendy Hale	Solomon Islands	58
20	Maria Teresa Monasterio	Bolivia	63
21	Michaela Breeze	Great Britain	63
22	Leila Lassouani	Algeria	63
23	~~Nora Köppel~~	Argentina	75
24	Elizabeth Poblete	Chile	75
25	Cristina Cornejo	Peru	+75
