= 2006 World Weightlifting Championships – Men's 56 kg =

The 2006 World Weightlifting Championships were held in Santo Domingo, Dominican Republic from 30 September to 7 October. The men's 56 kilograms division was staged on 30 September 2006.

== Schedule ==
Date	Time	Event
30 September 2006	12:00	Group C
30 September 2006	14:00	Group B
30 September 2006	16:00	Group A

== Medalists ==
Event	Gold		Silver		Bronze	
Snatch	Li Zheng (CHN)	128 kg	Hoàng Anh Tuấn (VIE)	124 kg	Sergio Álvarez (CUB)	123 kg
Clean & Jerk	Sergio Álvarez (CUB)	156 kg	Lee Jong-hoon (KOR)	155 kg	Hoàng Anh Tuấn (VIE)	152 kg
Total	Li Zheng (CHN)	280 kg	Sergio Álvarez (CUB)	279 kg	Hoàng Anh Tuấn (VIE)	276 kg

== Records ==
Prior to this competition, the existing world records were as follows.

World Record	Snatch	Halil Mutlu (TUR)	138 kg	Antalya, Turkey	4 November 2001
World Record	Clean & Jerk	Halil Mutlu (TUR)	168 kg	Trenčín, Slovakia	24 April 2001
World Record	Total	Halil Mutlu (TUR)	305 kg	Sydney, Australia	16 September 2000

== Results ==
Rank	Athlete	Group	Body weight	Snatch (kg)				Clean & Jerk (kg)				Total
Rank	Athlete	Group	Body weight	1	2	3	Rank	1	2	3	Rank	Total
1st place, gold medalist(s)	Li Zheng (CHN)	A	55.58	123	126	128	1st place, gold medalist(s)	~~152~~	152	~~154~~	5	280
2nd place, silver medalist(s)	Sergio Álvarez (CUB)	A	55.86	~~118~~	118	123	3rd place, bronze medalist(s)	148	153	156	1st place, gold medalist(s)	279
3rd place, bronze medalist(s)	Hoàng Anh Tuấn (VIE)	A	55.00	122	124	~~126~~	2nd place, silver medalist(s)	152	~~155~~	~~155~~	3rd place, bronze medalist(s)	276
4	Lee Jong-hoon (KOR)	A	55.74	~~120~~	~~120~~	120	7	~~147~~	148	155	2nd place, silver medalist(s)	275
5	Wang Shin-yuan (TPE)	A	55.69	121	~~124~~	~~124~~	5	151	~~155~~	~~160~~	6	272
6	Igor Bour (MDA)	A	55.51	114	118	~~121~~	8	148	150	~~154~~	8	268
7	Vitali Dzerbianiou (BLR)	A	55.92	118	~~122~~	122	4	142	146	~~148~~	11	268
8	Eko Yuli Irawan (INA)	A	55.21	~~116~~	116	~~121~~	9	143	150	~~153~~	7	266
9	Jadi Setiadi (INA)	A	54.41	~~120~~	120	~~123~~	6	~~145~~	145	~~151~~	12	265
10	Lázaro Ruiz (CUB)	B	55.34	~~112~~	112	115	10	143	147	~~151~~	9	262
11	Sergio Rada (COL)	B	55.85	107	112	114	12	~~138~~	138	142	13	256
12	Masaharu Yamada (JPN)	B	55.72	102	104	106	19	142	144	146	10	252
13	Igor Grabucea (MDA)	B	55.67	110	~~113~~	113	13	~~138~~	138	~~141~~	16	251
14	Arsen Tamrazyan (ARM)	B	56.00	110	~~113~~	~~113~~	15	135	~~139~~	139	15	249
15	László Tancsics (HUN)	B	55.40	109	112	114	11	131	134	~~138~~	20	248
16	Marvin López (ESA)	C	55.98	105	~~108~~	108	17	135	140	~~142~~	14	248
17	Yasunobu Sekikawa (JPN)	B	55.69	105	~~108~~	108	16	~~135~~	135	138	17	246
18	Enrique Valencia (ECU)	C	55.96	100	105	~~108~~	20	125	130	133	21	238
19	Zviadi Samukashvili (GEO)	B	55.69	103	~~107~~	~~107~~	22	~~132~~	132	—	22	235
20	Antoniu Buci (ROM)	B	55.84	102	107	~~110~~	18	~~128~~	128	~~135~~	24	235
21	Meng Wenjun (MAC)	C	54.97	110	~~116~~	~~116~~	14	~~120~~	122	—	27	232
22	Pongsak Maneetong (THA)	B	55.64	~~103~~	~~103~~	103	21	128	~~133~~	~~133~~	23	231
23	Éric Bonnel (FRA)	B	55.94	100	~~104~~	~~104~~	24	128	~~133~~	~~133~~	25	228
24	Vito Dellino (ITA)	C	55.96	~~95~~	95	~~101~~	25	~~125~~	~~125~~	125	26	220
25	Javier Guirado (ESP)	C	55.51	100	~~103~~	~~103~~	23	110	115	~~120~~	30	215
26	Döwran Akmyradow (TKM)	C	55.98	95	~~100~~	~~100~~	26	110	116	~~121~~	29	211
27	Omarguly Handurdyýew (TKM)	C	53.48	80	~~85~~	85	27	100	105	~~108~~	31	190
—	Tanasak Pan-em (THA)	B	54.88	~~102~~	~~102~~	~~102~~	—	133	137	~~140~~	18	—
—	Wu Meijin (CHN)	A	55.32	~~121~~	~~121~~	~~121~~	—	152	~~155~~	~~156~~	4	—
—	Jhon Fuentes (VEN)	C	55.63	~~107~~	~~107~~	~~107~~	—	135	137	~~140~~	19	—
—	Sylvain Andrieux (FRA)	C	55.66	~~98~~	~~98~~	~~98~~	—	~~118~~	—	—	—	—
—	Mubarak Kivumbi (UGA)	C	55.78	~~90~~	~~90~~	~~90~~	—	120	~~125~~	~~125~~	28	—
