= 2005 World Weightlifting Championships – Men's 56 kg =

The 2005 World Weightlifting Championships were held in Doha, Qatar from 9 November to 17 November. The men's 56 kilograms division was staged on 9 November 2005.

== Schedule ==
Date	Time	Event
9 November 2005	15:00	Group B
9 November 2005	20:00	Group A

== Medalists ==
Event	Gold		Silver		Bronze	
Snatch	Li Zheng (CHN)	127 kg	Hoàng Anh Tuấn (VIE)	126 kg	Wang Shin-yuan (TPE)	125 kg
Clean & Jerk	Wang Shin-yuan (TPE)	156 kg	Wu Meijin (CHN)	156 kg	Yang Chin-yi (TPE)	155 kg
Total	Wang Shin-yuan (TPE)	281 kg	Lee Jong-hoon (KOR)	280 kg	Hoàng Anh Tuấn (VIE)	279 kg

== Records ==
Prior to this competition, the existing world records were as follows.

World Record	Snatch	Halil Mutlu (TUR)	138 kg	Antalya, Turkey	4 November 2001
World Record	Clean & Jerk	Halil Mutlu (TUR)	168 kg	Trenčín, Slovakia	24 April 2001
World Record	Total	Halil Mutlu (TUR)	305 kg	Sydney, Australia	16 September 2000

== Results ==
Rank	Athlete	Group	Body weight	Snatch (kg)				Clean & Jerk (kg)				Total
Rank	Athlete	Group	Body weight	1	2	3	Rank	1	2	3	Rank	Total
1st place, gold medalist(s)	Wang Shin-yuan (TPE)	A	55.57	122	125	~~126~~	3rd place, bronze medalist(s)	153	~~156~~	156	1st place, gold medalist(s)	281
2nd place, silver medalist(s)	Lee Jong-hoon (KOR)	A	55.88	118	~~123~~	125	4	150	155	~~157~~	4	280
3rd place, bronze medalist(s)	Hoàng Anh Tuấn (VIE)	A	55.93	122	~~126~~	126	2nd place, silver medalist(s)	153	~~156~~	~~156~~	5	279
4	Wu Meijin (CHN)	A	55.65	122	~~125~~	~~126~~	5	156	~~158~~	~~158~~	2nd place, silver medalist(s)	278
5	Li Zheng (CHN)	A	55.49	~~122~~	122	127	1st place, gold medalist(s)	150	~~154~~	~~155~~	6	277
6	Yang Chin-yi (TPE)	A	55.56	~~120~~	120	~~125~~	6	150	155	~~156~~	3rd place, bronze medalist(s)	275
7	Nelson Castro (COL)	A	54.84	110	~~115~~	115	7	140	142	145	7	260
8	Sajjad Behrouzi (IRI)	A	55.95	110	115	~~117~~	8	130	136	140	11	255
9	Sergio Rada (COL)	A	55.85	105	~~110~~	110	12	136	~~142~~	143	8	253
10	Éric Bonnel (FRA)	A	55.91	107	111	~~113~~	10	135	140	142	9	253
11	Mohd Faizal Baharom (MAS)	B	55.32	110	~~115~~	~~115~~	11	130	~~140~~	140	10	250
12	Igor Grabucea (MDA)	A	55.37	~~112~~	112	~~117~~	9	~~137~~	137	~~140~~	12	249
13	Víctor Castellano (VEN)	B	55.95	102	106	109	13	130	137	~~142~~	13	246
14	Vicky Batta (IND)	B	55.99	107	~~112~~	~~112~~	14	~~127~~	~~127~~	127	15	234
15	Veerabadran Ganesan (IND)	B	55.25	100	~~105~~	~~105~~	16	125	132	~~137~~	14	232
16	Daniel Koum (CMR)	B	55.76	97	102	~~105~~	15	125	~~130~~	~~132~~	16	227
17	Róbert Ádám (HUN)	B	55.79	95	~~100~~	100	17	~~120~~	120	~~125~~	17	220
—	Omarguly Handurdyýew (TKM)	B	51.26	~~75~~	~~75~~	~~75~~	—	~~90~~	95	~~100~~	18	—
