= Weightlifting at the 2002 Asian Games – Men's 56 kg =

Men's 56 kg at the 2002 Asian Games
- Venue: Pukyong National University Gymnasium
- Date: 1 October 2002
- Competitors: 15 from 12 nations

Medalists
gold medal	Wu Meijin	China
silver medal	Wang Shin-yuan	Chinese Taipei
bronze medal	Yang Chin-yi	Chinese Taipei

The men's 56 kilograms event at the 2002 Asian Games took place on October 1, 2002 at Pukyong National University Gymnasium.

== Schedule ==
All times are Korea Standard Time (UTC+09:00)

Date	Time	Event
Tuesday, 1 October 2002	18:00	Group A

== Records ==
Prior to this competition, the existing world, Asian and Games records were as follows.

World Record	Snatch	Halil Mutlu (TUR)	138.5 kg	Antalya, Turkey	4 November 2001
World Record	Clean & Jerk	Halil Mutlu (TUR)	168.0 kg	Trenčín, Slovakia	24 April 2001
World Record	Total	Halil Mutlu (TUR)	305.0 kg	Sydney, Australia	16 September 2000
Asian Record	Snatch	Lan Shizhang (CHN)	130.0 kg	Szekszárd, Hungary	9 May 1998
Asian Record	Clean & Jerk	Lan Shizhang (CHN)	165.5 kg	Szekszárd, Hungary	9 May 1998
Asian Record	Total	Lan Shizhang (CHN)	295.0 kg	Szekszárd, Hungary	9 May 1998
Games Record	Snatch	Mehdi Panzvan (IRI)	122.5 kg	Bangkok, Thailand	7 December 1998
Games Record	Clean & Jerk	Lan Shizhang (CHN)	155.0 kg	Bangkok, Thailand	7 December 1998
Games Record	Total	Lan Shizhang (CHN)	275.0 kg	Bangkok, Thailand	7 December 1998

== Results ==
Legend

- NM — No mark

Rank	Athlete	Body weight	Snatch (kg)				Clean & Jerk (kg)				Total
Rank	Athlete	Body weight	1	2	3	Result	1	2	3	Result	Total
1st place, gold medalist(s)	Wu Meijin (CHN)	55.35	122.5	127.5	130.0	130.0	157.5	160.0	162.5	162.5	292.5
2nd place, silver medalist(s)	Wang Shin-yuan (TPE)	55.35	127.5	~~130.0~~	~~130.0~~	127.5	155.0	~~167.5~~	~~167.5~~	155.0	282.5
3rd place, bronze medalist(s)	Yang Chin-yi (TPE)	55.35	~~120.0~~	120.0	125.0	125.0	150.0	~~160.0~~	~~160.0~~	150.0	275.0
4	Jadi Setiadi (INA)	54.75	~~115.0~~	115.0	120.0	120.0	145.0	~~150.0~~	150.0	150.0	270.0
5	Kim Sae-hyuk (KOR)	54.90	117.5	~~122.5~~	~~122.5~~	117.5	~~147.5~~	147.5	~~155.0~~	147.5	265.0
6	Pak Un-chol (PRK)	55.75	115.0	~~120.0~~	~~120.0~~	115.0	142.5	147.5	~~150.0~~	147.5	262.5
7	Amirul Hamizan Ibrahim (MAS)	55.95	~~115.0~~	117.5	~~120.0~~	117.5	142.5	~~147.5~~	~~147.5~~	142.5	260.0
8	Masaharu Yamada (JPN)	55.70	102.5	~~107.5~~	~~107.5~~	102.5	135.0	140.0	~~145.0~~	140.0	242.5
9	Thandava Murthy Muthu (IND)	55.90	~~105.0~~	105.0	107.5	107.5	125.0	130.0	~~135.0~~	130.0	237.5
10	Rakesh Ranjeet (NEP)	55.40	~~92.5~~	95.0	~~97.5~~	95.0	~~120.0~~	120.0	~~127.5~~	120.0	215.0
11	Zaki Abdallah (LIB)	55.95	90.0	95.0	~~100.0~~	95.0	120.0	~~130.0~~	~~130.0~~	120.0	215.0
12	Khazai Al-Shameri (KUW)	55.35	80.0	~~90.0~~	90.0	90.0	100.0	~~105.0~~	~~105.0~~	100.0	190.0
13	Martinho de Araújo (TMP)	55.20	~~65.0~~	~~67.5~~	67.5	67.5	90.0	~~95.0~~	~~100.0~~	90.0	157.5
—	Yasuji Kikuzuma (JPN)	55.65	105.0	~~110.0~~	110.0	110.0	~~145.0~~	~~145.0~~	~~145.0~~	—	NM
—	Wu Wenxiong (CHN)	55.55	~~125.0~~	~~125.0~~	~~125.0~~	—	—	—	—	—	NM

== New records ==
The following records were established during the competition.

Snatch	125.0	Yang Chin-yi (TPE)	GR
Snatch	127.5	Wang Shin-yuan (TPE)	GR
Snatch	130.0	Wu Meijin (CHN)	GR
Clean & Jerk	157.5	Wu Meijin (CHN)	GR
Clean & Jerk	160.0	Wu Meijin (CHN)	GR
Clean & Jerk	162.5	Wu Meijin (CHN)	GR
Total	282.5	Wang Shin-yuan (TPE)	GR
Total	287.5	Wu Meijin (CHN)	GR
Total	290.0	Wu Meijin (CHN)	GR
Total	292.5	Wu Meijin (CHN)	GR
