= 1999 World Weightlifting Championships – Men's 56 kg =

Weightlifting competition

The Men's Bantamweight Weightlifting Event (56 kg) is the lightest men's weight class event at the weightlifting competition, limited to competitors with a maximum of 56 kilograms of body mass. The competition at the 1999 World Weightlifting Championships took place in Athens, Greece on November 22, 1999.

Each lifter performed in both the snatch and clean and jerk lifts, with the final score being the sum of the lifter's best result in each. The athlete received three attempts in each of the two lifts; the score for the lift was the heaviest weight successfully lifted.

== Medalists ==
Event	Gold		Silver		Bronze	
Snatch	Halil Mutlu (TUR)	137.5 kg	Sergio Álvarez (CUB)	125.0 kg	Adrian Jigău (ROM)	125.0 kg
Clean & Jerk	Halil Mutlu (TUR)	165.0 kg	Wang Shin-yuan (TPE)	157.5 kg	Ivan Ivanov (BUL)	157.5 kg
Total	Halil Mutlu (TUR)	302.5 kg	Adrian Jigău (ROM)	282.5 kg	Wang Shin-yuan (TPE)	280.0 kg

== Records ==
Prior to this competition, the existing world records were as follows.

World record	Snatch	Halil Mutlu (TUR)	135.5 kg	A Coruña, Spain	14 April 1999
World record	Clean & Jerk	Lan Shizhang (CHN)	165.5 kg	Szekszárd, Hungary	9 May 1998
World record	Total	World Standard	300.0 kg	—	1 January 1998

== Results ==
Rank	Athlete	Body weight	Snatch (kg)				Clean & Jerk (kg)				Total
Rank	Athlete	Body weight	1	2	3	Rank	1	2	3	Rank	Total
1st place, gold medalist(s)	Halil Mutlu (TUR)	55.83	130.0	136.0	137.5	1st place, gold medalist(s)	160.0	166.0	—	1st place, gold medalist(s)	302.5
2nd place, silver medalist(s)	Adrian Jigău (ROM)	55.90	125.0	~~127.5~~	~~127.5~~	3rd place, bronze medalist(s)	150.0	155.0	157.5	4	282.5
3rd place, bronze medalist(s)	Wang Shin-yuan (TPE)	55.60	120.0	122.5	~~125.0~~	4	150.0	155.0	157.5	2nd place, silver medalist(s)	280.0
4	Ivan Ivanov (BUL)	55.87	115.0	120.0	122.5	6	150.0	155.0	157.5	3rd place, bronze medalist(s)	280.0
5	Wu Wenxiong (CHN)	55.61	115.0	120.0	122.5	5	150.0	155.0	~~157.5~~	5	277.5
6	Sergio Álvarez (CUB)	55.78	~~117.5~~	117.5	125.0	2nd place, silver medalist(s)	145.0	150.0	~~155.0~~	7	275.0
7	Oleksandr Likhvald (UKR)	55.95	120.0	~~125.0~~	~~125.0~~	8	147.5	152.5	~~157.5~~	6	272.5
8	Liao Weixiao (CHN)	55.92	~~120.0~~	120.0	~~125.0~~	7	150.0	~~157.5~~	~~160.0~~	8	270.0
9	Yang Chin-yi (TPE)	55.21	115.0	~~120.0~~	~~120.0~~	9	145.0	147.5	~~150.0~~	9	262.5
10	Hwang Kyu-dong (KOR)	55.92	115.0	~~120.0~~	~~120.0~~	13	140.0	147.5	~~152.5~~	10	262.5
11	Éric Bonnel (FRA)	55.72	115.0	~~120.0~~	~~120.0~~	12	135.0	~~140.0~~	142.5	11	257.5
12	Koki Tagashira (JPN)	55.26	107.5	112.5	115.0	10	135.0	~~137.5~~	140.0	12	255.0
13	Igor Grabucea (MDA)	55.63	107.5	112.5	115.0	11	137.5	~~142.5~~	~~142.5~~	16	252.5
14	Nelson Castro (COL)	55.61	105.0	~~110.0~~	110.0	14	135.0	140.0	~~142.5~~	14	250.0
15	Yasuji Kikuzuma (JPN)	55.34	100.0	105.0	107.5	17	~~137.5~~	137.5	140.0	13	247.5
16	Johnny Hernández (VEN)	55.79	102.5	107.5	~~110.0~~	19	140.0	~~145.0~~	~~145.0~~	15	247.5
17	Luis Medrano (GUA)	55.90	110.0	~~112.5~~	~~112.5~~	16	130.0	135.0	~~137.5~~	19	245.0
18	Viktor Yansky (UZB)	55.69	102.5	105.0	107.5	18	130.0	135.0	~~140.0~~	18	242.5
19	Ali Hamid (EGY)	55.98	100.0	105.0	~~110.0~~	21	130.0	135.0	137.5	17	242.5
20	László Tancsics (HUN)	55.86	~~105.0~~	105.0	110.0	15	125.0	~~132.5~~	~~132.5~~	25	235.0
21	Manuel Minginfel (FSM)	55.55	95.0	100.0	102.5	22	125.0	130.0	~~135.0~~	20	232.5
22	Diego Salazar (COL)	55.83	100.0	~~105.0~~	~~105.0~~	23	130.0	~~135.0~~	~~135.0~~	21	230.0
23	Nafaa Benami (ALG)	55.06	100.0	105.0	~~107.5~~	20	120.0	~~125.0~~	~~125.0~~	28	225.0
24	Vladimirs Morozovs (LAT)	55.95	97.5	100.0	~~102.5~~	24	117.5	122.5	125.0	26	225.0
25	Michael Ponchard (FRA)	55.53	95.0	~~100.0~~	~~100.0~~	27	122.5	127.5	~~130.0~~	23	222.5
26	Juan Feijóo (ESP)	55.57	95.0	~~97.5~~	97.5	25	122.5	~~125.0~~	~~125.0~~	27	220.0
27	Wilfredo García (ESA)	55.55	92.5	~~97.5~~	~~97.5~~	28	120.0	125.0	~~127.5~~	24	217.5
28	Anatoli Shavalov (ISR)	56.00	92.5	~~97.5~~	~~97.5~~	29	115.0	120.0	~~125.0~~	31	212.5
29	Miguel Deliva (ESP)	55.92	87.5	~~92.5~~	~~92.5~~	32	115.0	120.0	~~122.5~~	30	207.5
30	Willen Dageago (NRU)	54.57	82.5	~~87.5~~	87.5	31	105.0	110.0	112.5	32	200.0
31	Willem Phillips (RSA)	55.60	90.0	~~95.0~~	~~95.0~~	30	107.5	~~112.5~~	~~112.5~~	33	197.5
—	Giuliano Cornetta (ITA)	55.97	97.5	~~102.5~~	~~102.5~~	26	~~125.0~~	~~125.0~~	~~125.0~~	—	—
—	Sunday Mathias (NGR)	55.83	~~100.0~~	~~100.0~~	~~100.0~~	—	~~130.0~~	~~130.0~~	130.0	22	—
—	Mikko Kuusisto (FIN)	55.77	~~95.0~~	~~95.0~~	~~95.0~~	—	115.0	120.0	~~122.5~~	29	—
—	Vitali Dzerbianiou (BLR)	55.86	~~115.0~~	—	—	—	—	—	—	—	—

== New records ==
Snatch	136.0 kg	Halil Mutlu (TUR)	WR
Snatch	137.5 kg	Halil Mutlu (TUR)	WR
Clean & Jerk	166.0 kg	Halil Mutlu (TUR)	WR
Total	302.5 kg	Halil Mutlu (TUR)	WR
