= 2007 World Weightlifting Championships – Men's 56 kg =

The men's competition in the bantamweight (56 kg) division was staged on September 17–18, 2007.

== Schedule ==
Date	Time	Event
17 September 2007	12:00	Group C
17 September 2007	20:00	Group B
18 September 2007	17:00	Group A

== Medalists ==
Event	Gold		Silver		Bronze	
Snatch	Li Zheng (CHN)	130 kg	Cha Kum-chol (PRK)	128 kg	Hoàng Anh Tuấn (VIE)	127 kg
Clean & Jerk	Sergio Álvarez (CUB)	156 kg	Cha Kum-chol (PRK)	155 kg	Eko Yuli Irawan (INA)	154 kg
Total	Cha Kum-chol (PRK)	283 kg	Li Zheng (CHN)	283 kg	Eko Yuli Irawan (INA)	278 kg

== Records ==
Prior to this competition, the existing world records were as follows.

World Record	Snatch	Halil Mutlu (TUR)	138 kg	Antalya, Turkey	4 November 2001
World Record	Clean & Jerk	Halil Mutlu (TUR)	168 kg	Trenčín, Slovakia	24 April 2001
World Record	Total	Halil Mutlu (TUR)	305 kg	Sydney, Australia	16 September 2000

== Results ==
Rank	Athlete	Group	Body weight	Snatch (kg)				Clean & Jerk (kg)				Total
Rank	Athlete	Group	Body weight	1	2	3	Rank	1	2	3	Rank	Total
1st place, gold medalist(s)	Cha Kum-chol (PRK)	A	55.64	125	128	~~130~~	2nd place, silver medalist(s)	150	155	~~157~~	2nd place, silver medalist(s)	283
2nd place, silver medalist(s)	Li Zheng (CHN)	A	55.69	125	128	130	1st place, gold medalist(s)	~~153~~	~~153~~	153	4	283
3rd place, bronze medalist(s)	Eko Yuli Irawan (INA)	A	55.84	~~124~~	124	~~127~~	5	154	~~156~~	~~156~~	3rd place, bronze medalist(s)	278
4	Sergio Álvarez (CUB)	A	55.90	118	~~124~~	~~124~~	9	150	~~156~~	156	1st place, gold medalist(s)	274
5	Ri Kyong-sok (PRK)	A	55.86	115	120	122	6	~~150~~	150	~~157~~	5	272
6	Igor Bour (MDA)	A	55.67	~~110~~	118	~~121~~	8	149	~~153~~	~~153~~	6	267
7	Vitali Dzerbianiou (BLR)	A	55.88	120	~~125~~	125	4	~~142~~	142	~~146~~	11	267
8	Wu Meijin (CHN)	A	55.53	~~120~~	~~120~~	120	7	145	~~150~~	—	7	265
9	Sedat Artuç (TUR)	A	55.59	~~115~~	~~115~~	115	10	~~135~~	135	140	12	255
10	Pongsak Maneetong (THA)	A	55.54	106	111	~~112~~	14	137	~~142~~	142	9	253
11	Arthouros Akritidis (GRE)	B	55.42	110	~~115~~	~~115~~	16	135	142	~~144~~	8	252
12	Igor Grabucea (MDA)	B	55.68	110	114	~~116~~	12	130	135	138	15	252
13	Nelson Castro (COL)	B	55.61	107	110	~~112~~	17	135	~~140~~	140	13	250
14	Yasunobu Sekikawa (JPN)	B	55.67	107	110	112	13	135	138	~~140~~	14	250
15	Phaisan Hansawong (THA)	B	55.85	~~105~~	105	~~111~~	21	135	140	142	10	247
16	Oliver Marchán (VEN)	B	55.97	105	~~110~~	110	18	132	~~141~~	~~141~~	18	242
17	Meng Wenjun (MAC)	C	54.87	105	~~110~~	110	15	120	125	130	20	240
18	Marvin López (ESA)	C	55.92	105	~~109~~	~~109~~	23	~~135~~	135	~~138~~	16	240
19	Róbert Ádám (HUN)	C	55.78	98	~~102~~	102	24	125	130	133	17	235
20	Vito Dellino (ITA)	C	55.83	100	105	~~108~~	20	~~130~~	130	~~135~~	22	235
21	Sultan Moldodosov (KGZ)	C	55.89	105	~~108~~	~~109~~	22	120	125	130	23	235
22	Zviadi Samukashvili (GEO)	C	55.30	100	~~103~~	~~103~~	25	130	~~135~~	~~135~~	21	230
23	Tsai Sheng-fen (TPE)	C	55.90	93	~~98~~	~~98~~	28	123	128	131	19	224
24	Massimiliano Rubino (ITA)	C	55.69	~~95~~	95	~~98~~	27	115	120	~~125~~	24	215
—	Hoàng Anh Tuấn (VIE)	A	55.90	124	127	~~129~~	3rd place, bronze medalist(s)	~~154~~	~~154~~	~~154~~	—	—
—	Manuel Minginfel (FSM)	A	55.75	115	~~120~~	~~120~~	11	~~140~~	~~140~~	~~140~~	—	—
—	Masaharu Yamada (JPN)	B	55.65	103	105	~~107~~	19	~~143~~	~~143~~	~~143~~	—	—
—	Matin Guntali (MAS)	C	55.73	~~100~~	100	~~105~~	26	~~130~~	~~132~~	~~135~~	—	—
—	Omarguly Handurdyýew (TKM)	C	55.68	~~95~~	~~95~~	~~95~~	—	115	~~120~~	~~120~~	25	—
