= Weightlifting at the 2006 Asian Games – Men's 56 kg =

Weightlifting event

Men's 56 kg at the 2006 Asian Games
- Venue: Al-Dana Banquet Hall
- Date: 2 December 2006
- Competitors: 16 from 13 nations

Medalists
gold medal	Li Zheng	China
silver medal	Hoàng Anh Tuấn	Vietnam
bronze medal	Lee Jong-hoon	South Korea

The men's 56 kilograms event at the 2006 Asian Games took place on December 2, 2006 at Al-Dana Banquet Hall in Doha.

== Schedule ==
All times are Arabia Standard Time (UTC+03:00)

Date	Time	Event
Saturday, 2 December 2006	10:00	Group B
Saturday, 2 December 2006	19:00	Group A

== Records ==
Prior to this competition, the existing world, Asian and Games records were as follows.

World Record	Snatch	Halil Mutlu (TUR)	138 kg	Antalya, Turkey	4 November 2001
World Record	Clean & Jerk	Halil Mutlu (TUR)	168 kg	Trenčín, Slovakia	24 April 2001
World Record	Total	Halil Mutlu (TUR)	305 kg	Sydney, Australia	16 September 2000
Asian Record	Snatch	Lan Shizhang (CHN)	130 kg	Szekszárd, Hungary	9 May 1998
Asian Record	Clean & Jerk	Lan Shizhang (CHN)	165 kg	Szekszárd, Hungary	9 May 1998
Asian Record	Total	Lan Shizhang (CHN)	295 kg	Szekszárd, Hungary	9 May 1998
Games Record	Snatch	Wu Meijin (CHN)	130 kg	Busan, South Korea	1 October 2002
Games Record	Clean & Jerk	Wu Meijin (CHN)	162 kg	Busan, South Korea	1 October 2002
Games Record	Total	Wu Meijin (CHN)	292 kg	Busan, South Korea	1 October 2002

== Results ==
Legend

- NM — No mark

Rank	Athlete	Group	Body weight	Snatch (kg)				Clean & Jerk (kg)				Total
Rank	Athlete	Group	Body weight	1	2	3	Result	1	2	3	Result	Total
1st place, gold medalist(s)	Li Zheng (CHN)	A	55.96	125	128	130	130	152	155	157	157	287
2nd place, silver medalist(s)	Hoàng Anh Tuấn (VIE)	A	55.63	123	126	128	128	~~154~~	154	157	157	285
3rd place, bronze medalist(s)	Lee Jong-hoon (KOR)	A	55.95	120	123	~~126~~	123	150	~~154~~	154	154	277
4	Cha Kum-chol (PRK)	A	55.93	123	126	~~128~~	126	150	~~153~~	~~153~~	150	276
5	Wang Shin-yuan (TPE)	A	55.89	~~118~~	118	~~122~~	118	155	~~159~~	~~159~~	155	273
6	Eko Yuli Irawan (INA)	A	55.72	118	121	~~126~~	121	150	~~155~~	~~156~~	150	271
7	Abdullatif Al-Abdullatif (KSA)	A	55.96	~~115~~	115	~~119~~	115	140	145	~~148~~	145	260
8	Meng Wenjun (MAC)	A	55.77	115	118	~~120~~	118	130	~~135~~	~~135~~	130	248
9	Zaki Abdallah (LIB)	A	55.99	95	100	~~102~~	100	122	130	~~134~~	130	230
10	Bekzat Osmonaliev (KGZ)	B	55.81	97	102	~~105~~	102	120	~~125~~	125	125	227
11	Ali Al-Khalaf (KSA)	B	55.95	90	~~98~~	98	98	~~118~~	118	~~120~~	118	216
12	Döwran Akmuradow (TKM)	B	55.94	95	~~100~~	~~100~~	95	112	~~118~~	118	118	213
13	Usman Akbar (PAK)	B	55.99	90	95	~~98~~	95	112	~~120~~	~~122~~	112	207
14	Omarguly Handurdyýew (TKM)	B	54.38	80	~~86~~	86	86	100	107	~~110~~	107	193
—	Ase Fadhul (BRN)	B	55.36	85	~~91~~	~~91~~	85	~~110~~	~~110~~	~~110~~	—	NM
—	Ri Kyong-sok (PRK)	A	55.77	~~118~~	~~118~~	~~118~~	—	—	—	—	—	NM
