= 2009 World Weightlifting Championships – Men's 56 kg =

The men's competition in the bantamweight (– 56 kg) division was staged on November 20, 2009.

== Schedule ==
Date	Time	Event
20 November 2009	16:00	Group B
20 November 2009	19:00	Group A

== Medalists ==
Event	Gold		Silver		Bronze	
Snatch	Wu Jingbiao (CHN)	131 kg	Long Qingquan (CHN)	130 kg	Khalil El-Maaoui (TUN)	125 kg
Clean & Jerk	Long Qingquan (CHN)	162 kg	Wu Jingbiao (CHN)	155 kg	Sergio Álvarez (CUB)	154 kg
Total	Long Qingquan (CHN)	292 kg	Wu Jingbiao (CHN)	286 kg	Sergio Álvarez (CUB)	274 kg

== Records ==
Prior to this competition, the existing world records were as follows.

World Record	Snatch	Halil Mutlu (TUR)	138 kg	Antalya, Turkey	4 November 2001
World Record	Clean & Jerk	Halil Mutlu (TUR)	168 kg	Trenčín, Slovakia	24 April 2001
World Record	Total	Halil Mutlu (TUR)	305 kg	Sydney, Australia	16 September 2000

== Results ==
Rank	Athlete	Group	Body weight	Snatch (kg)				Clean & Jerk (kg)				Total
Rank	Athlete	Group	Body weight	1	2	3	Rank	1	2	3	Rank	Total
1st place, gold medalist(s)	Long Qingquan (CHN)	A	55.43	125	130	~~132~~	2nd place, silver medalist(s)	156	162	~~169~~	1st place, gold medalist(s)	292
2nd place, silver medalist(s)	Wu Jingbiao (CHN)	A	56.00	125	~~131~~	131	1st place, gold medalist(s)	155	~~160~~	~~161~~	2nd place, silver medalist(s)	286
3rd place, bronze medalist(s)	Sergio Álvarez (CUB)	A	55.85	115	120	~~125~~	5	147	152	154	3rd place, bronze medalist(s)	274
4	Jadi Setiadi (INA)	A	55.44	118	123	—	4	~~147~~	~~150~~	150	4	273
5	Khalil El-Maaoui (TUN)	A	55.78	125	~~128~~	~~130~~	3rd place, bronze medalist(s)	142	146	~~151~~	6	271
6	Ruslan Makarov (UZB)	A	55.71	114	117	~~119~~	6	140	144	~~147~~	8	261
7	Yang Chin-yi (TPE)	A	55.86	115	~~121~~	~~121~~	7	145	~~150~~	~~150~~	7	260
8	Masaharu Yamada (JPN)	A	55.92	105	~~109~~	109	11	145	150	~~153~~	5	259
9	Víctor Castellano (VEN)	B	56.00	~~108~~	108	111	9	132	136	~~140~~	11	247
10	Erzat Osmonaliev (KGZ)	B	55.90	107	111	114	8	~~127~~	127	132	13	246
11	Yoichi Itokazu (JPN)	B	55.98	102	106	~~108~~	14	132	136	138	10	244
12	Vito Dellino (ITA)	A	55.79	105	~~109~~	~~109~~	15	135	~~140~~	~~140~~	12	240
13	Gökhan Kılıç (TUR)	B	55.94	105	108	110	10	125	130	~~132~~	15	240
14	Mustafa Ramo (SYR)	B	56.00	~~103~~	~~103~~	103	17	~~130~~	132	~~137~~	14	235
15	Ahmed Abdul-Monem (IRQ)	B	55.91	107	~~113~~	~~113~~	12	~~125~~	125	~~132~~	16	232
16	Iván Hernández (ESP)	B	55.85	97	101	~~103~~	18	~~120~~	~~120~~	120	17	221
—	Javier Guirado (ESP)	B	55.60	103	106	~~109~~	13	~~123~~	~~123~~	~~123~~	—	—
—	Omarguly Handurdyýew (TKM)	B	55.96	100	~~105~~	105	16	~~130~~	~~130~~	~~130~~	—	—
—	José Montes (MEX)	A	55.99	~~105~~	~~105~~	~~105~~	—	136	140	~~143~~	9	—
