= 2010 World Weightlifting Championships – Men's 56 kg =

The men's competition in the bantamweight (– 56 kg) division was held on 17 and 18 September 2010.

== Schedule ==
Date	Time	Event
17 September 2010	14:00	Group C
18 September 2010	11:30	Group B
18 September 2010	18:00	Group A

== Medalists ==
Event	Gold		Silver		Bronze	
Snatch	Wu Jingbiao (CHN)	132 kg	Cha Kum-chol (PRK)	130 kg	Long Qingquan (CHN)	127 kg
Clean & Jerk	Long Qingquan (CHN)	161 kg	Wu Jingbiao (CHN)	160 kg	Carlos Berna (COL)	152 kg
Total	Wu Jingbiao (CHN)	292 kg	Long Qingquan (CHN)	288 kg	Cha Kum-chol (PRK)	280 kg

== Records ==
Prior to this competition, the existing world records were as follows.

World Record	Snatch	Halil Mutlu (TUR)	138 kg	Antalya, Turkey	4 November 2001
World Record	Clean & Jerk	Halil Mutlu (TUR)	168 kg	Trenčín, Slovakia	24 April 2001
World Record	Total	Halil Mutlu (TUR)	305 kg	Sydney, Australia	16 September 2000

== Results ==
Rank	Athlete	Group	Body weight	Snatch (kg)				Clean & Jerk (kg)				Total
Rank	Athlete	Group	Body weight	1	2	3	Rank	1	2	3	Rank	Total
1st place, gold medalist(s)	Wu Jingbiao (CHN)	A	55.61	128	132	~~135~~	1st place, gold medalist(s)	153	157	160	2nd place, silver medalist(s)	292
2nd place, silver medalist(s)	Long Qingquan (CHN)	A	55.64	~~127~~	~~127~~	127	3rd place, bronze medalist(s)	154	161	~~166~~	1st place, gold medalist(s)	288
3rd place, bronze medalist(s)	Cha Kum-chol (PRK)	A	55.87	123	127	130	2nd place, silver medalist(s)	145	150	~~154~~	4	280
4	Ruslan Makarov (UZB)	A	55.93	117	120	~~124~~	6	145	149	~~154~~	5	269
5	Khalil El-Maaoui (TUN)	A	55.87	124	127	~~131~~	4	140	~~145~~	~~146~~	12	267
6	Carlos Hernández (CUB)	A	55.86	110	115	118	7	142	146	~~150~~	8	264
7	Carlos Berna (COL)	B	55.88	106	110	112	14	142	147	152	3rd place, bronze medalist(s)	264
8	Jadi Setiadi (INA)	B	55.19	115	121	—	5	135	~~142~~	142	10	263
9	Yasmani Romero (CUB)	A	55.93	110	115	~~118~~	11	140	~~146~~	146	9	261
10	Habib de las Salas (COL)	B	55.89	110	~~113~~	~~113~~	19	138	142	147	6	257
11	Bekzat Osmonaliev (KGZ)	B	55.96	115	~~118~~	~~118~~	12	131	136	141	11	256
12	Tom Goegebuer (BEL)	B	55.83	111	114	~~116~~	13	133	137	139	14	253
13	Masaharu Yamada (JPN)	B	55.83	103	~~106~~	106	20	~~142~~	142	146	7	252
14	Sumariyanto (INA)	B	55.51	110	~~115~~	116	8	135	~~142~~	~~145~~	17	251
15	Julio Salamanca (ESA)	B	56.00	108	112	~~114~~	16	138	~~141~~	~~141~~	15	250
16	Omarguly Handurdyýew (TKM)	B	55.90	105	109	112	15	130	136	~~140~~	16	248
17	Ghenadie Dudoglo (MDA)	A	55.82	~~115~~	~~115~~	115	10	132	~~136~~	~~136~~	18	247
18	Gökhan Kılıç (TUR)	B	55.87	112	~~116~~	116	9	130	~~135~~	~~137~~	19	246
19	Marvin López (ESA)	B	55.87	~~105~~	105	~~108~~	23	135	140	~~142~~	13	245
20	Javier Guirado (ESP)	C	55.52	103	107	110	17	122	126	128	22	238
21	Josué Brachi (ESP)	C	55.82	102	105	~~109~~	22	122	126	129	21	234
22	Vito Dellino (ITA)	B	55.89	101	~~105~~	~~105~~	25	~~130~~	~~130~~	130	20	231
23	Izzat Artykov (KGZ)	C	55.85	92	96	100	26	120	~~125~~	125	25	225
24	Elmar Aliyev (AZE)	C	55.49	~~95~~	~~95~~	95	30	120	127	~~132~~	23	222
25	Sylvain Andrieux (FRA)	C	55.72	96	~~100~~	~~100~~	27	120	125	~~129~~	24	221
26	Manueli Tulo (FIJ)	C	56.00	95	~~100~~	~~100~~	32	~~125~~	125	~~129~~	26	220
27	Romario Avdiraj (ALB)	C	55.87	90	~~95~~	95	31	110	115	120	28	215
—	Igor Grabucea (MDA)	B	55.83	~~110~~	110	~~113~~	18	~~130~~	~~130~~	~~130~~	—	—
—	Tanasak Pan-em (THA)	C	55.43	105	~~110~~	—	21	—	—	—	—	—
—	Yoichi Itokazu (JPN)	B	55.83	~~104~~	104	~~107~~	24	~~135~~	~~135~~	~~135~~	—	—
—	Gergely Soóky (HUN)	C	55.91	92	96	~~99~~	28	~~118~~	~~118~~	~~118~~	—	—
—	Róbert Ádám (HUN)	C	55.36	92	~~95~~	95	29	~~118~~	~~118~~	~~118~~	—	—
—	Michal Beláň (SVK)	C	55.68	~~96~~	~~96~~	~~97~~	—	115	118	121	27	—
—	Karrar Mohammed (IRQ)	C	55.98	~~100~~	100	106	—	125	~~130~~	130	—	—
—	Sadiq Al-Hubail (KSA)	C	56.00	~~102~~	102	107	—	~~123~~	123	~~129~~	—	—
—	Mansour Al-Saleem (KSA)	C	50.68	~~105~~	105	~~108~~	—	120	~~127~~	~~127~~	—	—
DQ	Hoàng Anh Tuấn (VIE)	A	55.73	123	~~126~~	~~127~~	—	150	~~154~~	~~154~~	—	—
