= Weightlifting at the 2000 Summer Olympics – Men's 56 kg =

Weightlifting at the Olympics

Men's 56 kg at the Games of the XXVII Olympiad
- Venue: Sydney Convention and Exhibition Centre
- Date: 16 September 2000
- Competitors: 22 from 19 nations

Medalists
| 1st place, gold medalist(s) | | Halil Mutlu | Turkey |
| 2nd place, silver medalist(s) | | Wu Wenxiong | China |
| 3rd place, bronze medalist(s) | | Zhang Xiangxiang | China |

The men's 56 kilograms weightlifting event at the 2000 Summer Olympics in Sydney, Australia took place at the Sydney Convention and Exhibition Centre on September 16.

Total score was the sum of the lifter's best result in each of the snatch and the clean and jerk, with three lifts allowed for each lift. In case of a tie, the lighter lifter won; if still tied, the lifter who took the fewest attempts to achieve the total score won. Lifters without a valid snatch score did not perform the clean and jerk.

== Schedule ==
All times are Australian Eastern Time (UTC+10:00)

| Date | Time | Event |
|---|---|---|
| 16 September 2000 | 14:30 | Group B |
| 16 September 2000 | 18:30 | Group A |

== Records ==
Prior to this competition, the existing world and Olympic records were as follows.

| World Record | Snatch | Halil Mutlu (TUR) | 137.5 kg | Athens, Greece | 22 November 1999 |
| World Record | Clean & Jerk | Halil Mutlu (TUR) | 166.0 kg | Athens, Greece | 22 November 1999 |
| World Record | Total | Halil Mutlu (TUR) | 302.5 kg | Athens, Greece | 22 November 1999 |
| Olympic Record | Snatch | Olympic Standard | 135.0 kg | — | 1 January 1997 |
| Olympic Record | Clean & Jerk | Olympic Standard | 165.0 kg | — | 1 January 1997 |
| Olympic Record | Total | Olympic Standard | 300.0 kg | — | 1 January 1997 |

== Results ==
| Rank | Athlete | Group | Body weight | Snatch (kg) | | | | Clean & Jerk (kg) | | | | Total |
| Rank | Athlete | Group | Body weight | 1 | 2 | 3 | Result | 1 | 2 | 3 | Result | Total |
|---|---|---|---|---|---|---|---|---|---|---|---|---|
| 1st place, gold medalist(s) | Halil Mutlu (TUR) | A | 55.62 | 130.0 | 135.0 | 137.5 | 137.5 | 160.0 | 167.5 | ~~170.0~~ | 167.5 | 305.0 |
| 2nd place, silver medalist(s) | Wu Wenxiong (CHN) | A | 55.48 | 125.0 | ~~130.0~~ | ~~130.0~~ | 125.0 | 157.5 | ~~162.5~~ | 162.5 | 162.5 | 287.5 |
| 3rd place, bronze medalist(s) | Zhang Xiangxiang (CHN) | A | 55.94 | 125.0 | ~~130.0~~ | ~~130.0~~ | 125.0 | ~~157.5~~ | 157.5 | 162.5 | 162.5 | 287.5 |
| 4 | Wang Shin-yuan (TPE) | A | 55.38 | 125.0 | ~~127.5~~ | ~~127.5~~ | 125.0 | 155.0 | 160.0 | ~~162.5~~ | 160.0 | 285.0 |
| 5 | Sergio Álvarez (CUB) | A | 55.66 | ~~120.0~~ | 120.0 | ~~125.0~~ | 120.0 | 150.0 | 155.0 | ~~160.0~~ | 155.0 | 275.0 |
| 6 | Adrian Jigău (ROM) | A | 55.72 | 122.5 | ~~127.5~~ | ~~127.5~~ | 122.5 | 152.5 | ~~157.5~~ | ~~157.5~~ | 152.5 | 275.0 |
| 7 | Vitali Dzerbianiou (BLR) | B | 55.96 | 115.0 | 120.0 | 125.0 | 125.0 | 145.0 | 150.0 | ~~155.0~~ | 150.0 | 275.0 |
| 8 | Yang Chin-yi (TPE) | A | 55.58 | 120.0 | ~~125.0~~ | ~~127.5~~ | 120.0 | ~~150.0~~ | 150.0 | ~~155.0~~ | 150.0 | 270.0 |
| 9 | Oleksandr Likhvald (UKR) | A | 55.86 | 120.0 | ~~125.0~~ | ~~125.0~~ | 120.0 | 150.0 | ~~155.0~~ | ~~155.0~~ | 155.0 | 270.0 |
| 10 | Hwang Kyu-dong (KOR) | A | 55.94 | ~~110.0~~ | 110.0 | 115.0 | 115.0 | 142.5 | 147.5 | 152.5 | 152.5 | 267.5 |
| 11 | Nelson Castro (COL) | A | 55.32 | 110.0 | 115.0 | ~~117.5~~ | 115.0 | 140.0 | ~~145.0~~ | 145.0 | 145.0 | 260.0 |
| 12 | Luis Medrano (GUA) | B | 55.94 | 115.0 | ~~117.5~~ | ~~117.5~~ | 115.0 | 137.5 | 140.0 | 142.5 | 142.5 | 257.5 |
| 13 | Koki Tagashira (JPN) | B | 55.44 | 107.5 | 112.5 | ~~117.5~~ | 112.5 | 135.0 | 140.0 | ~~142.5~~ | 140.0 | 252.5 |
| 14 | Éric Bonnel (FRA) | A | 55.70 | 112.5 | ~~117.5~~ | ~~117.5~~ | 112.5 | 140.0 | ~~147.5~~ | ~~147.5~~ | 140.0 | 252.5 |
| 15 | Yasuji Kikuzuma (JPN) | B | 55.82 | ~~105.0~~ | ~~105.0~~ | 105.0 | 105.0 | ~~140.0~~ | 140.0 | 145.0 | 145.0 | 250.0 |
| 16 | Thandava Murthy Muthu (IND) | B | 55.90 | 105.0 | 110.0 | ~~112.5~~ | 110.0 | 130.0 | ~~135.0~~ | 135.0 | 135.0 | 245.0 |
| 17 | Mehmet Yağcı (AUS) | B | 55.94 | ~~100.0~~ | 100.0 | 105.0 | 105.0 | 125.0 | 130.0 | ~~135.0~~ | 130.0 | 235.0 |
| 18 | Orlando Vásquez (NCA) | B | 55.84 | 102.5 | ~~107.5~~ | ~~107.5~~ | 102.5 | 130.0 | ~~135.0~~ | ~~135.0~~ | 130.0 | 232.5 |
| 19 | Gino Soupprayen (MRI) | B | 55.88 | 90.0 | 95.0 | ~~100.0~~ | 95.0 | 110.0 | 115.0 | ~~117.5~~ | 115.0 | 210.0 |
| 20 | Martinho de Araújo (IOA) | B | 55.54 | ~~65.0~~ | ~~65.0~~ | 67.5 | 67.5 | 85.0 | 90.0 | ~~95.0~~ | 90.0 | 157.5 |
| — | Manuel Minginfel (FSM) | B | 55.70 | ~~97.5~~ | ~~97.5~~ | ~~97.5~~ | — | — | — | — | — | — |
| DQ | Ivan Ivanov (BUL) | A | 55.92 | 125.0 | ~~130.0~~ | 130.0 | 130.0 | 155.0 | 160.0 | 162.5 | 162.5 | ~~292.5~~ |

- Ivan Ivanov originally won the silver medal, but he was disqualified after he tested positive for furosemide.

== New records ==
| Snatch | 138.0 kg | Halil Mutlu (TUR) | WR |
| Clean & Jerk | 167.5 kg | Halil Mutlu (TUR) | WR |
| Total | 305.0 kg | Halil Mutlu (TUR) | WR |
