= 2011 Asian Weightlifting Championships =

International weightlifting competition

The 2011 Asian Weightlifting Championships were held at Tongling Municipal Stadium in Tongling, Anhui Province, China between April 13 and April 17, 2011. It was the 42nd men's and 23rd women's championship.

== Medal summary ==
=== Men ===
| Event | Gold | | Silver | | Bronze | |
56 kg
| Snatch | Wu Jingbiao; China | 130 kg | Majid Askari; Iran | 115 kg | Ruslan Makarov; Uzbekistan | 114 kg |
| Clean & Jerk | Wu Jingbiao; China | 158 kg | Majid Askari; Iran | 140 kg | Ruslan Makarov; Uzbekistan | 140 kg |
| Total | Wu Jingbiao; China | 288 kg | Majid Askari; Iran | 255 kg | Ruslan Makarov; Uzbekistan | 254 kg |
62 kg
| Snatch | Zhang Jie; China | 147 kg | Kim Un-guk; North Korea | 140 kg | Cha Kum-chol; North Korea | 131 kg |
| Clean & Jerk | Zhang Jie; China | 170 kg | Cha Kum-chol; North Korea | 167 kg | Kim Un-guk; North Korea | 166 kg |
| Total | Zhang Jie; China | 317 kg | Kim Un-guk; North Korea | 306 kg | Cha Kum-chol; North Korea | 298 kg |
69 kg
| Snatch | Lin Qingfeng; China | 152 kg | Morteza Rezaeian; Iran | 141 kg | Ravi Kumar Katulu; India | 139 kg |
| Clean & Jerk | Lin Qingfeng; China | 176 kg | Kim Un-dok; North Korea | 173 kg | Ravi Kumar Katulu; India | 167 kg |
| Total | Lin Qingfeng; China | 328 kg | Kim Un-dok; North Korea | 308 kg | Ravi Kumar Katulu; India | 306 kg |
77 kg
| Snatch | Lü Xiaojun; China | 160 kg | Kirill Pavlov; Kazakhstan | 150 kg | Pang Kum-chol; North Korea | 150 kg |
| Clean & Jerk | Lü Xiaojun; China | 192 kg | Pang Kum-chol; North Korea | 191 kg | Kirill Pavlov; Kazakhstan | 185 kg |
| Total | Lü Xiaojun; China | 352 kg | Pang Kum-chol; North Korea | 341 kg | Kirill Pavlov; Kazakhstan | 335 kg |
85 kg
| Snatch | Lu Yong; China | 173 kg | Kianoush Rostami; Iran | 162 kg | Vladimir Kuznetsov; Kazakhstan | 160 kg |
| Clean & Jerk | Lu Yong; China | 212 kg | Kianoush Rostami; Iran | 201 kg | Vladimir Kuznetsov; Kazakhstan | 190 kg |
| Total | Lu Yong; China | 385 kg | Kianoush Rostami; Iran | 363 kg | Vladimir Kuznetsov; Kazakhstan | 350 kg |
94 kg
| Snatch | Kim Min-jae; South Korea | 178 kg | Li Bing; China | 165 kg | Almas Uteshov; Kazakhstan | 162 kg |
| Clean & Jerk | Li Bing; China | 220 kg | Kim Min-jae; South Korea | 210 kg | Jung Hyeon-seop; South Korea | 207 kg |
| Total | Kim Min-jae; South Korea | 388 kg | Li Bing; China | 385 kg | Jung Hyeon-seop; South Korea | 368 kg |
105 kg
| Snatch | Yang Zhe; China | 187 kg | Sergey Istomin; Kazakhstan | 181 kg | Ahed Joughili; Syria | 180 kg |
| Clean & Jerk | Ahed Joughili; Syria | 217 kg | Yang Zhe; China | 216 kg | Sergey Istomin; Kazakhstan | 215 kg |
| Total | Yang Zhe; China | 403 kg | Ahed Joughili; Syria | 397 kg | Sergey Istomin; Kazakhstan | 396 kg |
+105 kg
| Snatch | Behdad Salimi; Iran | 208 kg | Sun Haibo; China | 200 kg | Kazuomi Ota; Japan | 180 kg |
| Clean & Jerk | Behdad Salimi; Iran | 250 kg | Mohammad Ali; Syria | 222 kg | Bahador Molaei; Iran | 222 kg |
| Total | Behdad Salimi; Iran | 458 kg | Bahador Molaei; Iran | 398 kg | Mohammad Ali; Syria | 393 kg |

=== Women ===
| Event | Gold | | Silver | | Bronze | |
48 kg
| Snatch | Tian Yuan; China | 93 kg | Mahliyo Togoeva; Uzbekistan | 68 kg | Wen Shih-ping; Chinese Taipei | 68 kg |
| Clean & Jerk | Tian Yuan; China | 113 kg | Wen Shih-ping; Chinese Taipei | 90 kg | Khumukcham Sanjita Chanu; India | 90 kg |
| Total | Tian Yuan; China | 206 kg | Wen Shih-ping; Chinese Taipei | 158 kg | Khumukcham Sanjita Chanu; India | 158 kg |
53 kg
| Snatch | Li Ping; China | 90 kg | Yu Weili; Hong Kong | 85 kg | Santoshi Matsa; India | 70 kg |
| Clean & Jerk | Li Ping; China | 125 kg | Yu Weili; Hong Kong | 110 kg | Santoshi Matsa; India | 88 kg |
| Total | Li Ping; China | 215 kg | Yu Weili; Hong Kong | 195 kg | Santoshi Matsa; India | 158 kg |
58 kg
| Snatch | Li Xueying; China | 107 kg | Jong Chun-mi; North Korea | 92 kg | Chomchailai Prachamorn; Thailand | 90 kg |
| Clean & Jerk | Jong Chun-mi; North Korea | 130 kg | Li Xueying; China | 128 kg | Chomchailai Prachamorn; Thailand | 117 kg |
| Total | Li Xueying; China | 235 kg | Jong Chun-mi; North Korea | 222 kg | Chomchailai Prachamorn; Thailand | 207 kg |
63 kg
| Snatch | Ouyang Xiaofang; China | 110 kg | Pak Hyon-suk; North Korea | 106 kg | Mayu Hashida; Japan | 90 kg |
| Clean & Jerk | Ouyang Xiaofang; China | 134 kg | Pak Hyon-suk; North Korea | 130 kg | Mayu Hashida; Japan | 110 kg |
| Total | Ouyang Xiaofang; China | 244 kg | Pak Hyon-suk; North Korea | 236 kg | Mayu Hashida; Japan | 200 kg |
69 kg
| Snatch | Zhang Shaoling; Macau | 105 kg | Wang Ya-jhen; Chinese Taipei | 100 kg | Yu Un-bok; North Korea | 96 kg |
| Clean & Jerk | Zhang Shaoling; Macau | 123 kg | Wang Ya-jhen; Chinese Taipei | 122 kg | Ayano Tani; Japan | 121 kg |
| Total | Zhang Shaoling; Macau | 228 kg | Wang Ya-jhen; Chinese Taipei | 222 kg | Ayano Tani; Japan | 217 kg |
75 kg
| Snatch | Xiang Yanmei; China | 115 kg | Kazue Imahoko; Japan | 100 kg | Tatyana Khromova; Kazakhstan | 100 kg |
| Clean & Jerk | Xiang Yanmei; China | 146 kg | Kim Un-ju; North Korea | 146 kg | Tatyana Khromova; Kazakhstan | 123 kg |
| Total | Xiang Yanmei; China | 261 kg | Tatyana Khromova; Kazakhstan | 223 kg | Kazue Imahoko; Japan | 217 kg |
+75 kg
| Snatch | Zhou Lulu; China | 141 kg AR | Meng Suping; China | 134 kg | Alexandra Aborneva; Kazakhstan | 110 kg |
| Clean & Jerk | Meng Suping; China | 170 kg | Zhou Lulu; China | 158 kg | Alexandra Aborneva; Kazakhstan | 143 kg |
| Total | Meng Suping; China | 304 kg | Zhou Lulu; China | 299 kg | Alexandra Aborneva; Kazakhstan | 253 kg |

== Medal table ==
Ranking by Big (Total result) medals

| Rank | Nation | Gold | Silver | Bronze | Total |
|---|---|---|---|---|---|
| 1 | China | 12 | 2 | 0 | 14 |
| 2 | Iran | 1 | 3 | 0 | 4 |
| 3 | South Korea | 1 | 0 | 1 | 2 |
| 4 | Macau | 1 | 0 | 0 | 1 |
| 5 | North Korea | 0 | 5 | 1 | 6 |
| 6 | Chinese Taipei | 0 | 2 | 0 | 2 |
| 7 | Kazakhstan | 0 | 1 | 4 | 5 |
| 8 | Syria | 0 | 1 | 1 | 2 |
| 9 | Hong Kong | 0 | 1 | 0 | 1 |
| 10 | India | 0 | 0 | 3 | 3 |
| 10 | Japan | 0 | 0 | 3 | 3 |
| 12 | Thailand | 0 | 0 | 1 | 1 |
| 12 | Uzbekistan | 0 | 0 | 1 | 1 |
| Totals (13 entries) | | 15 | 15 | 15 | 45 |

Ranking by all medals: Big (Total result) and Small (Snatch and Clean & Jerk)

| Rank | Nation | Gold | Silver | Bronze | Total |
|---|---|---|---|---|---|
| 1 | China | 35 | 8 | 0 | 43 |
| 2 | Iran | 3 | 8 | 1 | 12 |
| 3 | Macau | 3 | 0 | 0 | 3 |
| 4 | South Korea | 2 | 1 | 2 | 5 |
| 5 | North Korea | 1 | 13 | 5 | 19 |
| 6 | Syria | 1 | 2 | 2 | 5 |
| 7 | Chinese Taipei | 0 | 5 | 1 | 6 |
| 8 | Kazakhstan | 0 | 3 | 13 | 16 |
| 9 | Hong Kong | 0 | 3 | 0 | 3 |
| 10 | Japan | 0 | 1 | 7 | 8 |
| 11 | Uzbekistan | 0 | 1 | 3 | 4 |
| 12 | India | 0 | 0 | 8 | 8 |
| 13 | Thailand | 0 | 0 | 3 | 3 |
| Totals (13 entries) | | 45 | 45 | 45 | 135 |

== Team ranking ==
=== Men ===
| Rank | Team | Points |
|---|---|---|
| 1 | China | 604 |
| 2 | Iran | 515 |
| 3 | Kazakhstan | 469 |
| 4 | Uzbekistan | 439 |
| 5 | South Korea | 320 |
| 6 | North Korea | 310 |

=== Women ===
| Rank | Team | Points |
|---|---|---|
| 1 | China | 576 |
| 2 | Japan | 273 |
| 3 | Kazakhstan | 269 |
| 4 | India | 257 |
| 5 | North Korea | 245 |
| 6 | Uzbekistan | 215 |

== Participating nations ==
94 athletes from 20 nations competed.

- Bangladesh (2)
- China (15)
- Chinese Taipei (4)
- Hong Kong (1)
- India (5)
- Iran (8)
- Japan (7)
- Kazakhstan (12)
- Macau (1)
- Mongolia (1)
- Myanmar (2)
- Nepal (1)
- North Korea (9)
- Qatar (1)
- South Korea (6)
- Sri Lanka (1)
- Syria (3)
- Tajikistan (1)
- Thailand (3)
- Uzbekistan (11)
