= Weightlifting at the 2005 Islamic Solidarity Games =

Weightlifting at the 2005 Islamic Solidarity Games was held at the Amanat Al-Madina Hall, Medina from April 13 to April 17, 2005.

== Medalists ==
=== Total ===
Event	Gold	Silver	Bronze
56 kg	Abdullatif Al-Abdullatif; Saudi Arabia	Mohammed Abdul-Monem; Iraq	Mohd Faizal Baharom; Malaysia
62 kg	Ali Al-Dhilab; Saudi Arabia	Ümürbek Bazarbaýew; Turkmenistan	Salim Abdullah; Iraq
69 kg	Abdulmohsen Al-Bagir; Saudi Arabia	Mohd Hidayat Hamidon; Malaysia	Kutman Moldodosov; Kyrgyzstan
77 kg	Harem Taha; Iraq	Hussain Al-Abdullatif; Saudi Arabia	Maksudjan Rejepow; Turkmenistan
85 kg	Ulanbek Moldodosov; Kyrgyzstan	Natig Hasanov; Azerbaijan	Abdullah Iskandarani; Syria
94 kg	Mohammed Jasim; Iraq	Ramzi Al-Mahrous; Saudi Arabia	Alibay Samadov; Azerbaijan
105 kg	Ahed Joughili; Syria	Khudair Sobhi; Iraq	Nizami Pashayev; Azerbaijan
+105 kg	Haidar Dakhil; Iraq	Ammar Yosr; Iraq	Awad Al-Aboudi; Jordan

=== Snatch ===
Event	Gold	Silver	Bronze
56 kg	Mohammed Abdul-Monem; Iraq	Abdullatif Al-Abdullatif; Saudi Arabia	Mohd Faizal Baharom; Malaysia
62 kg	Ümürbek Bazarbaýew; Turkmenistan	Ali Al-Dhilab; Saudi Arabia	Tolkunbek Hudaýbergenow; Turkmenistan
69 kg	Abdulmohsen Al-Bagir; Saudi Arabia	Kutman Moldodosov; Kyrgyzstan	Jafar Al-Bagir; Saudi Arabia
77 kg	Harem Taha; Iraq	Hussain Al-Abdullatif; Saudi Arabia	Maksudjan Rejepow; Turkmenistan
85 kg	Natig Hasanov; Azerbaijan	Ulanbek Moldodosov; Kyrgyzstan	Abdullah Iskandarani; Syria
94 kg	Mohammed Jasim; Iraq	Ramzi Al-Mahrous; Saudi Arabia	Alibay Samadov; Azerbaijan
105 kg	Nizami Pashayev; Azerbaijan	Khudair Sobhi; Iraq	Ahed Joughili; Syria
+105 kg	Haidar Dakhil; Iraq	Ammar Yosr; Iraq	Awad Al-Aboudi; Jordan

=== Clean & jerk ===
Event	Gold	Silver	Bronze
56 kg	Abdullatif Al-Abdullatif; Saudi Arabia	Mohd Faizal Baharom; Malaysia	Mohammed Abdul-Monem; Iraq
62 kg	Ali Al-Dhilab; Saudi Arabia	Salim Abdullah; Iraq	Ümürbek Bazarbaýew; Turkmenistan
69 kg	Abdulmohsen Al-Bagir; Saudi Arabia	Mohd Hidayat Hamidon; Malaysia	Kutman Moldodosov; Kyrgyzstan
77 kg	Harem Taha; Iraq	Sarmad Mohammed; Iraq	Hussain Al-Abdullatif; Saudi Arabia
85 kg	Ulanbek Moldodosov; Kyrgyzstan	Natig Hasanov; Azerbaijan	Abdullah Iskandarani; Syria
94 kg	Ramzi Al-Mahrous; Saudi Arabia	Mohammed Jasim; Iraq	Hamza Abu-Ghalia; Libya
105 kg	Ahed Joughili; Syria	Khudair Sobhi; Iraq	Nizami Pashayev; Azerbaijan
+105 kg	Haidar Dakhil; Iraq	Najim Al-Radwan; Saudi Arabia	Ammar Yosr; Iraq

== Medal table ==
Rank	Nation	Gold	Silver	Bronze	Total
1	Iraq (IRQ)	9	9	3	21
2	Saudi Arabia (KSA)	8	7	2	17
3	Azerbaijan (AZE)	2	2	4	8
4	Kyrgyzstan (KGZ)	2	2	2	6
5	Syria (SYR)	2	0	4	6
6	Turkmenistan (TKM)	1	1	4	6
7	Malaysia (MAS)	0	3	2	5
8	Jordan (JOR)	0	0	2	2
9	Libya (LBA)	0	0	1	1
Totals (9 entries)		24	24	24	72
