= Weightlifting at the 2008 Summer Olympics – Men's 56 kg =

Men's 56 kg at the Games of the XXIX Olympiad
- Venue: Beihang University Gymnasium
- Date: 10 August 2008
- Competitors: 19 from 16 nations

Medalists
1st place, gold medalist(s)		Long Qingquan	China
2nd place, silver medalist(s)		Hoàng Anh Tuấn	Vietnam
3rd place, bronze medalist(s)		Eko Yuli Irawan	Indonesia

The men's 56 kilograms weightlifting event was the lightest men's event at the weightlifting competition, limiting competitors to a maximum of 56 kilograms of body mass. The whole competition took place on August 10, but was divided in two parts due to the number of competitors. Group B weightlifters competed at 10:00, and Group A, at 19:00. This event was the third Weightlifting event to conclude.

Each lifter performed in both the snatch and clean and jerk lifts, with the final score being the sum of the lifter's best result in each. The athlete received three attempts in each of the two lifts; the score for the lift was the heaviest weight successfully lifted.

The Athens gold medalist Turkish Halil Mutlu was not in Beijing to attempt his 4th straight gold medal.

== Schedule ==
All times are China Standard Time (UTC+08:00)

Date	Time	Event
10 August 2008	10:00	Group B
10 August 2008	19:00	Group A

== Records ==
Prior to this competition, the existing world and Olympic records were as follows.

World Record	Snatch	Halil Mutlu (TUR)	138 kg	Antalya, Turkey	4 November 2001
World Record	Clean & Jerk	Halil Mutlu (TUR)	168 kg	Trenčín, Slovakia	24 April 2001
World Record	Total	Halil Mutlu (TUR)	305 kg	Sydney, Australia	16 September 2000
Olympic Record	Snatch	Halil Mutlu (TUR)	138 kg	Sydney, Australia	16 September 2000
Olympic Record	Clean & Jerk	Halil Mutlu (TUR)	167 kg	Sydney, Australia	16 September 2000
Olympic Record	Total	Halil Mutlu (TUR)	305 kg	Sydney, Australia	16 September 2000

== Results ==
Rank	Athlete	Group	Body weight	Snatch (kg)				Clean & Jerk (kg)				Total
Rank	Athlete	Group	Body weight	1	2	3	Result	1	2	3	Result	Total
1st place, gold medalist(s)	Long Qingquan (CHN)	A	55.37	125	130	132	132	155	160	~~164~~	160	292
2nd place, silver medalist(s)	Hoàng Anh Tuấn (VIE)	A	55.97	126	~~130~~	130	130	155	~~160~~	160	160	290
3rd place, bronze medalist(s)	Eko Yuli Irawan (INA)	A	55.91	125	~~130~~	130	130	152	~~158~~	158	158	288
4	Yang Chin-yi (TPE)	A	55.43	125	~~128~~	128	128	154	157	~~160~~	157	285
5	Cha Kum-chol (PRK)	A	55.85	~~128~~	~~128~~	128	128	~~155~~	155	~~160~~	155	283
6	Sergio Álvarez (CUB)	A	55.67	~~120~~	120	~~125~~	120	152	~~161~~	~~166~~	152	272
7	Wang Shin-yuan (TPE)	A	55.53	~~115~~	115	~~120~~	115	146	~~150~~	150	150	265
8	Amirul Hamizan Ibrahim (MAS)	A	55.77	116	121	~~123~~	121	~~144~~	144	~~148~~	144	265
9	Masaharu Yamada (JPN)	B	55.84	~~103~~	103	106	106	142	147	153	153	259
10	Pongsak Maneetong (THA)	B	55.64	112	116	~~120~~	116	142	~~146~~	~~146~~	142	258
11	Yasunobu Sekikawa (JPN)	B	55.79	108	112	114	114	138	~~142~~	142	142	256
12	Sergio Rada (COL)	B	55.74	107	~~112~~	112	112	135	140	~~142~~	140	252
13	Tom Goegebuer (BEL)	B	55.94	109	112	114	114	132	135	137	137	251
14	Vito Dellino (ITA)	B	55.99	102	107	110	110	132	137	~~140~~	137	247
15	Igor Grabucea (MDA)	B	55.63	105	109	~~112~~	109	~~130~~	130	~~135~~	130	239
—	Sedat Artuç (TUR)	B	55.98	~~115~~	~~115~~	~~115~~	—	—	—	—	—	—
—	Khalil El-Maaoui (TUN)	A	55.87	123	126	~~130~~	126	~~142~~	~~142~~	~~142~~	—	—
—	Ri Kyong-sok (PRK)	A	55.82	~~122~~	~~122~~	~~122~~	—	—	—	—	—	—
—	Vitali Dzerbianiou (BLR)	A	55.88	120	125	127	127	~~140~~	~~140~~	~~140~~	—	—
