= 2001 World Weightlifting Championships – Men's 56 kg =

The 2001 World Weightlifting Championships were held in Antalya, Turkey from November 4 to November 11. The men's competition in the bantamweight (56 kg) division was staged on 4 November 2001.

== Medalists ==
Event	Gold		Silver		Bronze	
Snatch	Halil Mutlu (TUR)	137.5 kg	William Vargas (CUB)	127.5 kg	Wang Shin-yuan (TPE)	122.5 kg
Clean & Jerk	Halil Mutlu (TUR)	162.5 kg	Wang Shin-yuan (TPE)	157.5 kg	Sergio Álvarez (CUB)	150.0 kg
Total	Halil Mutlu (TUR)	300.0 kg	Wang Shin-yuan (TPE)	280.0 kg	William Vargas (CUB)	277.5 kg

== Records ==
Prior to this competition, the existing world records were as follows.

World Record	Snatch	Halil Mutlu (TUR)	138.0 kg	Sydney, Australia	16 September 2000
World Record	Clean & Jerk	Halil Mutlu (TUR)	168.0 kg	Trenčín, Slovakia	24 April 2001
World Record	Total	Halil Mutlu (TUR)	305.0 kg	Sydney, Australia	16 September 2000

== Results ==
Rank	Athlete	Body weight	Snatch (kg)				Clean & Jerk (kg)				Total
Rank	Athlete	Body weight	1	2	3	Rank	1	2	3	Rank	Total
1st place, gold medalist(s)	Halil Mutlu (TUR)	55.96	132.5	138.5	—	1st place, gold medalist(s)	162.5	~~168.5~~	~~168.5~~	1st place, gold medalist(s)	300.0
2nd place, silver medalist(s)	Wang Shin-yuan (TPE)	55.38	~~122.5~~	~~122.5~~	122.5	3rd place, bronze medalist(s)	152.5	157.5	~~162.5~~	2nd place, silver medalist(s)	280.0
3rd place, bronze medalist(s)	William Vargas (CUB)	55.98	122.5	125.0	127.5	2nd place, silver medalist(s)	155.0	~~155.0~~	~~155.0~~	4	277.5
4	Sedat Artuç (TUR)	55.72	120.0	~~122.5~~	122.5	4	~~147.5~~	~~147.5~~	147.5	5	270.0
5	Sergio Álvarez (CUB)	55.84	~~117.5~~	117.5	~~122.5~~	7	150.0	~~155.0~~	~~155.0~~	3rd place, bronze medalist(s)	267.5
6	Vitali Dzerbianiou (BLR)	55.86	115.0	120.0	~~125.0~~	6	140.0	~~147.5~~	147.5	6	267.5
7	László Tancsics (HUN)	55.48	115.0	120.0	~~122.5~~	5	140.0	145.0	~~147.5~~	7	265.0
8	Diego Salazar (COL)	55.76	115.0	~~120.0~~	~~120.0~~	8	~~140.0~~	140.0	~~142.5~~	10	255.0
9	Víctor Castellano (VEN)	55.82	110.0	~~117.5~~	~~117.5~~	10	~~140.0~~	140.0	142.5	9	252.5
10	Thandava Murthy Muthu (IND)	55.76	100.0	107.5	110.0	9	130.0	~~135.0~~	135.0	11	245.0
11	Alejandro Romo (MEX)	55.82	95.0	100.0	~~102.5~~	12	125.0	130.0	~~132.5~~	12	230.0
12	Mohammed Abdul-Monem (IRQ)	55.92	102.5	~~110.0~~	~~110.0~~	11	110.0	122.5	127.5	13	230.0
13	Agshin Mirzayev (AZE)	55.82	~~92.5~~	92.5	100.0	13	~~117.5~~	117.5	~~125.0~~	14	217.5
—	Wang Yingtong (CHN)	55.78	~~120.0~~	~~120.0~~	~~120.0~~	—	142.5	~~147.5~~	~~147.5~~	8	—

== New records ==
Snatch	138.5 kg	Halil Mutlu (TUR)	WR
