= Weightlifting at the 2010 South American Games – Men's 56kg =

The Men's 56 kg event at the 2010 South American Games was held over March 26 at 16:00. Since there were only three athletes in the competition, no bronze medal was awarded.

== Medalists ==
Gold	Silver	Bronze
Sergio Rada; Colombia	Jhon Fuentes; Venezuela	no medal

== Results ==
Rank	Athlete	Bodyweight	Snatch			Clean & Jerk			Total
Rank	Athlete	Bodyweight	1	2	3	1	2	3	Total
1st place, gold medalist(s)	Sergio Rada (COL)	56.00	110	~~113~~	~~114~~	139	~~142~~	142	252
2nd place, silver medalist(s)	Jhon Fuentes (VEN)	55.99	109	~~112~~	113	137	~~140~~	~~142~~	250
3	Diego Montecino (CHI)	55.77	97	~~105~~	~~105~~	~~122~~	122	~~130~~	219
