= Weightlifting at the 1996 Summer Olympics – Men's 54 kg =

Weightlifting at the Olympics

Men's 54 kg at the Games of the XXVI Olympiad
- Venue: Georgia World Congress Center
- Date: 20 July 1996
- Competitors: 22 from 19 nations
- Winning total: 287.5 kg

Medalists
| 1st place, gold medalist(s) | | Halil Mutlu | Turkey |
| 2nd place, silver medalist(s) | | Zhang Xiangsen | China |
| 3rd place, bronze medalist(s) | | Sevdalin Minchev | Bulgaria |

These are the results of the men's 54 kg competition in weightlifting at the 1996 Summer Olympics in Atlanta. A total number of 21 athletes competed in this event.

== Results ==
Each weightlifter had three attempts for both the snatch and clean and jerk lifting methods. The total of the best successful lift of each method was used to determine the final rankings and medal winners. The weightlifter from Turkey won the gold, with a combined lift of 287.5 kg.

| Rank | Athlete | Group | Body weight | Snatch (kg) | | | | Clean & Jerk (kg) | | | | Total |
| Rank | Athlete | Group | Body weight | 1 | 2 | 3 | Result | 1 | 2 | 3 | Result | Total |
|---|---|---|---|---|---|---|---|---|---|---|---|---|
| 1st place, gold medalist(s) | Halil Mutlu (TUR) | A | 53.91 | 125.0 | 130.0 | 132.5 | 132.5 | ~~152.5~~ | 152.5 | 155.0 | 155.0 | 287.5 |
| 2nd place, silver medalist(s) | Zhang Xiangsen (CHN) | A | 53.39 | 122.5 | ~~127.5~~ | 130.0 | 130.0 | 150.0 | ~~155.0~~ | ~~157.5~~ | 150.0 | 280.0 |
| 3rd place, bronze medalist(s) | Sevdalin Minchev (BUL) | A | 54.00 | 117.5 | 122.5 | 125.0 | 125.0 | 147.5 | 152.5 | ~~157.5~~ | 152.5 | 277.5 |
| 4 | Lan Shizhang (CHN) | A | 53.61 | 120.0 | 125.0 | ~~127.5~~ | 125.0 | 150.0 | ~~157.5~~ | ~~162.5~~ | 150.0 | 275.0 |
| 5 | Traian Cihărean (ROU) | A | 53.90 | 115.0 | 120.0 | ~~122.5~~ | 120.0 | 140.0 | 145.0 | ~~152.5~~ | 145.0 | 265.0 |
| 6 | Ivan Ivanov (BUL) | A | 53.90 | ~~112.5~~ | ~~112.5~~ | 112.5 | 112.5 | ~~145.0~~ | 145.0 | ~~155.0~~ | 145.0 | 257.5 |
| 7 | Ko Kwang-ku (KOR) | A | 53.89 | 115.0 | ~~120.0~~ | ~~120.0~~ | 115.0 | 140.0 | ~~145.0~~ | ~~145.0~~ | 140.0 | 255.0 |
| 8 | Juan Fernández (COL) | B | 53.94 | 105.0 | 110.0 | ~~112.5~~ | 110.0 | 135.0 | 140.0 | 145.0 | 145.0 | 255.0 |
| 9 | Wang Shin-yuan (TPE) | B | 53.56 | 105.0 | ~~110.0~~ | ~~110.0~~ | 105.0 | 135.0 | 140.0 | 145.0 | 145.0 | 250.0 |
| 10 | Toshiyuki Notomi (JPN) | A | 53.60 | 105.0 | ~~110.0~~ | 110.0 | 110.0 | 135.0 | ~~140.0~~ | 140.0 | 140.0 | 250.0 |
| 11 | Eric Bonnel (FRA) | B | 53.68 | 105.0 | 110.0 | 115.0 | 115.0 | 135.0 | ~~140.0~~ | ~~140.0~~ | 135.0 | 250.0 |
| 12 | Hari Setiawan (INA) | B | 53.90 | ~~105.0~~ | 105.0 | ~~110.0~~ | 105.0 | ~~145.0~~ | 145.0 | ~~152.5~~ | 145.0 | 250.0 |
| 13 | Marek Gorzelniak (POL) | A | 53.85 | 102.5 | 107.5 | ~~110.0~~ | 107.5 | 137.5 | ~~142.5~~ | ~~142.5~~ | 137.5 | 245.0 |
| 14 | Viktor Yansky (UZB) | B | 53.94 | 102.5 | ~~107.5~~ | 107.5 | 107.5 | 132.5 | 135.0 | ~~140.0~~ | 135.0 | 242.5 |
| 15 | Giovanni Scarantino (ITA) | B | 53.89 | 105.0 | ~~110.0~~ | 110.0 | 110.0 | 125.0 | 130.0 | ~~132.5~~ | 130.0 | 240.0 |
| 16 | Nelson Castro (COL) | B | 53.05 | 97.5 | 102.5 | 105.0 | 105.0 | 125.0 | 130.0 | ~~135.0~~ | 130.0 | 235.0 |
| 17 | Johnny Nguyen (AUS) | B | 54.00 | ~~100.0~~ | 100.0 | ~~105.0~~ | 100.0 | 127.5 | 132.5 | ~~135.0~~ | 132.5 | 232.5 |
| 18 | Badathala Adisekhar (IND) | B | 53.93 | 100.0 | 105.0 | ~~107.5~~ | 105.0 | 125.0 | ~~130.0~~ | ~~130.0~~ | 125.0 | 230.0 |
| 19 | Vladimirs Morozovs (LAT) | B | 53.81 | ~~97.5~~ | 97.5 | 100.0 | 100.0 | 117.5 | 122.5 | ~~125.0~~ | 122.5 | 222.5 |
| 20 | Luis Medrano (GUA) | B | 53.41 | 100.0 | ~~102.5~~ | ~~102.5~~ | 100.0 | ~~120.0~~ | 120.0 | ~~125.0~~ | 120.0 | 220.0 |
| 21 | Gino Soupprayen Padiatty (MRI) | B | 53.43 | 90.0 | 95.0 | ~~97.5~~ | 95.0 | ~~105.0~~ | 105.0 | ~~112.5~~ | 105.0 | 200.0 |
| | Tibor Karczag (HUN) | B | 53.96 | ~~107.5~~ | ~~107.5~~ | ~~107.5~~ | – | – | – | – | – | – |
