= Luis Pineda =

Luis Pineda may refer to:

- Luis Pineda (baseball) (born 1974), Dominican baseball player
- Luis Pineda (weightlifter) (born 1988), Colombian weightlifter
- Luis Pineda (footballer) (born 1992), Mexican footballer
