= Weightlifting at the 2004 Summer Olympics – Men's 56 kg =

Weightlifting at the Olympics

Men's 56 kg at the Games of the XXVIII Olympiad
- Venue: Nikaia Olympic Weightlifting Hall
- Date: 15 August 2004
- Competitors: 17 from 14 nations

Medalists
1st place, gold medalist(s)		Halil Mutlu	Turkey
2nd place, silver medalist(s)		Wu Meijin	China
3rd place, bronze medalist(s)		Sedat Artuç	Turkey

The men's 56 kilograms weightlifting event at the 2004 Summer Olympics in Athens, Greece took place at the Nikaia Olympic Weightlifting Hall on 15 August.

Total score was the sum of the lifter's best result in each of the snatch and the clean and jerk, with three lifts allowed for each lift. In case of a tie, the lighter lifter won; if still tied, the lifter who took the fewest attempts to achieve the total score won. Lifters without a valid snatch score did not perform the clean and jerk.

== Schedule ==
All times are Eastern European Summer Time (UTC+03:00)

Date	Time	Event
15 August 2004	10:30	Group B
15 August 2004	20:00	Group A

== Records ==
{{{caption}}}
World Record	Snatch	Halil Mutlu (TUR)	138.5 kg	Antalya, Turkey	4 November 2001
World Record	Clean & Jerk	Halil Mutlu (TUR)	168.0 kg	Trenčín, Slovakia	24 April 2001
World Record	Total	Halil Mutlu (TUR)	305.0 kg	Sydney, Australia	16 September 2000
Olympic Record	Snatch	Halil Mutlu (TUR)	137.5 kg	Sydney, Australia	16 September 2000
Olympic Record	Clean & Jerk	Halil Mutlu (TUR)	167.5 kg	Sydney, Australia	16 September 2000
Olympic Record	Total	Halil Mutlu (TUR)	305.0 kg	Sydney, Australia	16 September 2000

== Results ==
Rank	Athlete	Group	Body weight	Snatch (kg)				Clean & Jerk (kg)				Total
Rank	Athlete	Group	Body weight	1	2	3	Result	1	2	3	Result	Total
1st place, gold medalist(s)	Halil Mutlu (TUR)	A	55.93	130.0	135.0	~~140.0~~	135.0	160.0	~~165.0~~	~~168.5~~	160.0	295.0
2nd place, silver medalist(s)	Wu Meijin (CHN)	A	55.69	125.0	~~130.0~~	130.0	130.0	157.5	~~165.0~~	~~165.0~~	157.5	287.5
3rd place, bronze medalist(s)	Sedat Artuç (TUR)	A	55.36	125.0	~~127.5~~	~~127.5~~	125.0	150.0	~~155.0~~	155.0	155.0	280.0
4	Vitali Dzerbianiou (BLR)	A	55.85	120.0	125.0	127.5	127.5	145.0	~~152.5~~	152.5	152.5	280.0
5	Óscar Figueroa (COL)	B	55.93	120.0	125.0	~~127.5~~	125.0	145.0	150.0	155.0	155.0	280.0
6	Adrian Jigău (ROM)	A	55.79	~~120.0~~	120.0	~~125.0~~	120.0	150.0	~~152.5~~	155.0	155.0	275.0
7	László Tancsics (HUN)	A	55.45	~~117.5~~	117.5	122.5	122.5	~~145.0~~	145.0	150.0	150.0	272.5
8	Jadi Setiadi (INA)	A	53.86	~~117.5~~	117.5	~~122.5~~	117.5	145.0	~~150.0~~	~~155.0~~	145.0	262.5
9	Nelson Castro (COL)	B	55.71	112.5	117.5	~~120.0~~	117.5	140.0	145.0	~~150.0~~	145.0	262.5
10	Mohammed Abdul-Monem (IRQ)	B	55.97	120.0	~~130.0~~	~~130.0~~	120.0	135.0	~~140.0~~	~~140.0~~	135.0	255.0
11	Ahmed Saad (EGY)	B	55.92	97.5	102.5	~~105.0~~	102.5	120.0	127.5	130.0	130.0	232.5
—	Masaharu Yamada (JPN)	B	55.76	~~102.5~~	~~102.5~~	~~102.5~~	—	—	—	—	—	—
—	Nafaa Benami (ALG)	B	55.40	105.0	~~110.0~~	~~110.0~~	105.0	~~130.0~~	—	—	—	—
—	Mohd Faizal Baharom (MAS)	B	55.47	110.0	~~115.0~~	~~115.0~~	110.0	~~132.5~~	~~132.5~~	~~132.5~~	—	—
—	Yang Chin-yi (TPE)	A	55.50	~~120.0~~	~~120.0~~	~~120.0~~	—	—	—	—	—	—
—	Wang Shin-yuan (TPE)	A	55.30	~~125.0~~	~~125.0~~	~~127.5~~	—	—	—	—	—	—
—	Éric Bonnel (FRA)	B	55.78	~~112.5~~	~~112.5~~	~~112.5~~	—	—	—	—	—	—
