= Jeffrey Wittmer =

American weightlifter (born 1984)

Personal information
- Born: September 30, 1984 (age 41) St. Louis, Missouri, United States

Sport
- Sport: Weightlifting
Medal record
Men's Weightlifting
Representing United States
Pan American Championships
Bronze medal – third place	2008 Callao	– 94 kg

Jeffrey Michael Wittmer (born September 30, 1984) in St. Louis, Missouri is a weightlifter for the United States.

Getting his start in his basement gym Jeff won his first 50 competitions. Jeff is featured on the cover of the book Explosive Lifting for Sports by Harvey Newton. He holds multiple national titles and records. Jeff graduated from Hazelwood West High School in 2003. After graduation, he accepted an invitation to the Olympic Training Center in Colorado Springs, CO. At the 2006 World Championships he ranked 26th in the 94 kg category, with a total of 338 kg.

His most notable performances include 5th place at the 2007 Pan American Games in Rio de Janeiro, Brazil. He won a silver, and two bronze medals at the 2008 Pan American Championships in Callao, Peru, in the 94 kg category, with a total of 347 kg.

He is known for his extreme flexibility and gutsy performances. Jeff was a favorite to make the 2-man Olympic team for the 2008 Summer Olympics, but fell just short at the Olympic Trials in Atlanta, GA.
