= Hari Setiawan =

Indonesian weightlifter (born 1970)

Personal information
- Nationality: Indonesian
- Born: 10 November 1970 (age 54)

Sport
- Sport: Weightlifting

Hari Setiawan (born 10 November 1970) is an Indonesian weightlifter. He competed in the men's flyweight event at the 1996 Summer Olympics.
