= Ravi Kumar Katulu =

Indian weightlifter (born 1988)

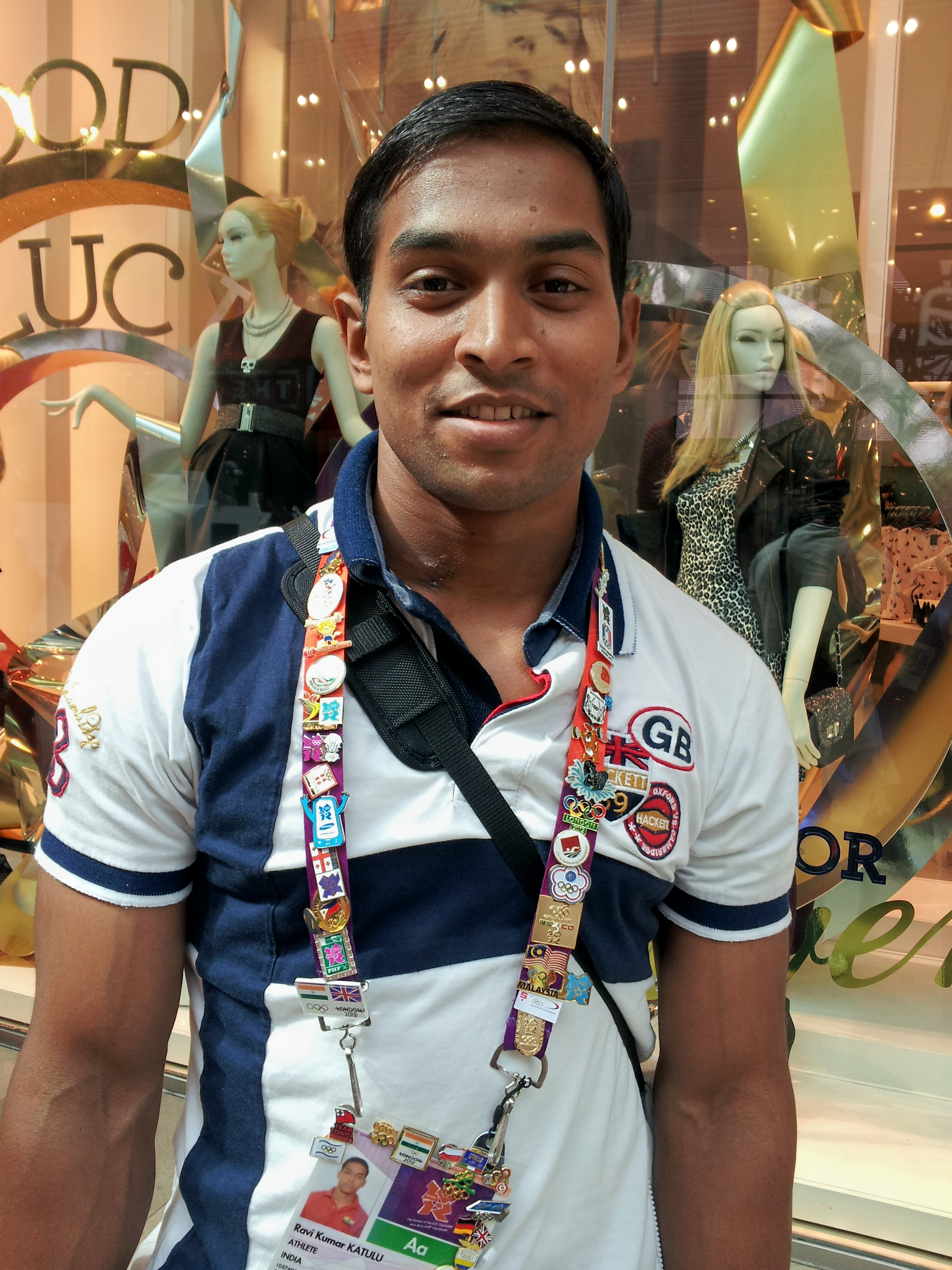
- Ravi at the 2012 London Olympics

Personal information
- Born: 24 April 1988 (age 38) Berhampur, Odisha, India
- Education: Berhampur University
- Height: 1.7 m (5 ft 7 in)
- Police career
- Branch: Odisha Police
- Service years: 2016–present
- Rank: Deputy Superintendent of Police
- Awards: Arjuna Award
Medal record
Men's weightlifting
Representing India
Commonwealth Games
Gold medal – first place	2010 Delhi	69kg
Silver medal – second place	2014 Glasgow	77kg
Commonwealth Championships
Gold medal – first place	2009 Penang	69kg
Asian Championships
Bronze medal – third place	2011 Tongling	69kg
Asian Junior Championships
Silver medal – second place	2007 Jordan	69kg

Ravi Kumar Katulu (born 24 April 1988) is an Indian former weightlifter. At the 2010 Commonwealth Games, he won a gold medal in the men's 69 kg event. Ravi represented India in the men's 69 kg event at the 2012 London Olympics.

== Career ==
Ravi started weightlifting at the Veer Hanuman Club in Behrampur. He was originally a bodybuilder for seven years before he took up weightlifting. However, after his trainer Narayan Sahu's counsel he changed his attention towards weightlifting, which at last made him an outstanding performer. He took up weightlifting just three years before the 2010 Commonwealth Games, and won with a record total of 321 kg (708 lb).

Ravi won many State, National, and International awards in this short span of time. He won gold in 2009 Commonwealth Championships held at Penang.

Then in 2010, he won gold medal at the Commonwealth Games. He lifted 147 kg (324 lb) in the Snatch and 175 kg (386 lb) in the Clean and Jerk for a total of 321 kg (708 lb) in the 69 kg weightlifting category.

In 2011, he won bronze in Asian Championships at Tongling.

Ravi finished 12th in the men's 69 kg category at the 2012 London Olympics, with lifts of 135 kg in snatch and 172 kg in clean and jerk, totaling 307 kg.

He won a silver at the 2014 Commonwealth Games in the 69 kg division. His lifts were 142 kg in the snatch and 175 kg in the clean and jerk for a total of 317 kg. He came in second to fellow Indian weightlifter Sathish Sivalingam, who set a new Games Record to win. He placed 10th in the men's 77 kg category at the 2014 Asian Games in Incheon, recording lifts of 141 kg in the snatch and 172 kg in the clean and jerk for a total of 313 kg.

On 5 November 2019, National Anti-Doping Agency handed him a four-year ban after he tested positive for Ostarine. He has retired from professional weightlifting ever since his ban.
