= Zhang Xiangsen =

Chinese weightlifter (born 1972)

Medal record

Men's Weightlifting

Representing China

Olympic Games
Silver medal – second place	1996 Atlanta	–54 kg

World Championships
Gold medal – first place	1995 Guangzhou	–54kg

Asian Championships
Gold medal – first place	1996 Yachiyo	–54kg
Silver medal – second place	1995 Busan	–54kg

Zhang Xiangsen (Chinese: 张祥森; born November 5, 1972) is a male weightlifter from China. He competed at the 1996 Atlanta Olympics and won a silver medal in the men's 56kg division.
