= Luis Medrano =

Guatemalan weightlifter

Personal information
- Full name: Luis Enrique Medrano Toj
- Born: 9 September 1976 (age 49)
- Height: 159 cm (5 ft 3 in)
- Weight: 55.90 kg (123.2 lb)

Sport
- Country: Guatemala
- Sport: Weightlifting
- Weight class: 56 kg
- Team: National team
- Updated on 28 September 2016

Luis Enrique Medrano Toj (born 9 September 1976) is a Guatemalan male weightlifter, competing in the 56 kg category and representing Guatemala at international competitions. He participated at the 1996 Summer Olympics in the 54 kg event and at the 2000 Summer Olympics in the 56 kg event. He competed at world championships, most recently at the 1999 World Weightlifting Championships.

== Major results ==
Year	Locale	Weight	Snatch (kg)				Clean & Jerk (kg)				Total	Rank
Year	Locale	Weight	1	2	3	Rank	1	2	3	Rank	Total	Rank
Summer Olympics
2000	Sydney, Australia	56 kg				—N/a				—N/a		12
1996	Atlanta, United States	54 kg				—N/a				—N/a		20
World Championships
1999	Piraeus, Greece	56 kg	110	~~112.5~~	~~112.5~~	16	130	135	~~137.5~~	19	245	17
