= Koki Tagashira =

Japanese weightlifter

Personal information
- Full name: Koki Tagashira
- Born: 25 September 1973 (age 52) Fukushima Prefecture, Japan
- Height: 156 cm (5 ft 1 in)
- Weight: 55.26 kg (121.8 lb)

Sport
- Country: Japan
- Sport: Weightlifting
- Weight class: 56 kg
- Team: National team
- Updated on 28 September 2016

Koki Tagashira (田頭 弘毅, Tagashira Kōki; born 25 September 1973 in Fukushima Prefecture) is a Japanese male weightlifter, competing in the 56 kg category and representing Japan at international competitions. He participated at the 2000 Summer Olympics in the 56 kg event. He competed at world championships, most recently at the 1999 World Weightlifting Championships.

== Major results ==
Year	Venue	Weight	Snatch (kg)				Clean & Jerk (kg)				Total	Rank
Year	Venue	Weight	1	2	3	Rank	1	2	3	Rank	Total	Rank
Summer Olympics
2000	Sydney, Australia	56 kg				—N/a				—N/a		13
World Championships
1999	Piraeus, Greece	56 kg	107.5	112.5	115	10	135	137.5	140	12	255	12
