= Zviadi Samukashvili =

Georgian weightlifter

Personal information
- Born: 22 November 1987 (age 38)
- Weight: 55.30 kg (121.9 lb)

Sport
- Country: Georgia
- Sport: Weightlifting
- Weight class: 56 kg
- Team: National team
- Coached by: Zurab Antauri
- Updated on 8 September 2016

Zviadi Samukashvili (Georgian: ზვიადი სამუკაშვილი; born 22 November 1987) is a Georgian male weightlifter, competing in the 56 kg category and representing Georgia at international competitions. He competed in world championships, most recently at the 2007 World Weightlifting Championships.

== Major results ==
Year	Venue	Weight	Snatch (kg)				Clean & Jerk (kg)				Total	Rank
Year	Venue	Weight	1	2	3	Rank	1	2	3	Rank	Total	Rank
World Championships
2007	Chiang Mai, Thailand	56 kg	100	~~103~~	~~103~~	25	130	~~135~~	~~135~~	21	230	22
2006	Santo Domingo, Dominican Republic	56 kg	103	~~107~~	~~107~~	22	~~132~~	132	---	22	235.0	19
