= Javier Guirado =

Spanish weightlifter

Personal information
- Full name: Francisco Javier Guirado Garcia
- Born: 24 November 1985 (age 40)
- Weight: 55.91 kg (123.3 lb)

Sport
- Country: Spain
- Sport: Weightlifting
- Team: National Team
- Updated on 5 September 2016

Francisco Javier Guirado Garcia (Note: In this Spanish name, the first or paternal surname is Guirado and the second or maternal family name is Garcia.) (born 24 November 1985) is a Spanish male weightlifter, competing in the 56 kg category and representing Spain at international competitions. He competed at world championships, most recently at the 2011 World Weightlifting Championships.

== Major results ==
Year	Venue	Weight	Snatch (kg)				Clean & Jerk (kg)				Total	Rank
Year	Venue	Weight	1	2	3	Rank	1	2	3	Rank	Total	Rank
World Championships
2011	Paris, France	56 kg	105	109	~~113~~	21	125	130	133	21	242	20
2010	Antalya, Turkey	56 kg	103	107	110	17	122	126	128	22	238	20
2009	Goyang, South Korea	56 kg	103	106	~~109~~	13	~~123~~	~~123~~	~~123~~	---	0	---
2006	Santo Domingo, Dominican Republic	56 kg	100	~~103~~	~~103~~	23	110	115	~~120~~	30	215.0	25
