= Carlos Hernández (weightlifter, born 1983) =

Cuban weightlifter

Personal information
- Full name: Carlos Hernandez
- Born: 3 June 1983 (age 43)
- Weight: 55.82 kg (123.1 lb)

Sport
- Country: Cuba
- Sport: Weightlifting
- Team: National team
- Updated on 6 September 2016

Carlos Hernández (born 3 June 1983) is a Cuban male weightlifter, competing in the 56 kg category and representing Cuba at international competitions. He competed at world championships, most recently at the 2011 World Weightlifting Championships.

== Major results ==
Year	Venue	Weight	Snatch (kg)				Clean & Jerk (kg)				Total	Rank
Year	Venue	Weight	1	2	3	Rank	1	2	3	Rank	Total	Rank
World Championships
2011	Paris, France	56 kg	110	~~115~~	~~115~~	17	~~142~~	---	---	---	0	---
2010	Antalya, Turkey	56 kg	110	115	118	7	142	146	~~150~~	8	264	6
