= Johnny Nguyen (weightlifter) =

Australian weightlifter

Personal information
- Nationality: Australian
- Born: 6 March 1975 (age 50); Saigon, South Vietnam

Sport
- Sport: Weightlifting

Johnny Nguyen (born 6 March 1975) is an Australian former weightlifter. He competed in the men's flyweight event at the 1996 Summer Olympics.
