= Hwang Gyu-dong =

South Korean weightlifter

Personal information
- Nationality: South Korean
- Born: 30 December 1975 (age 49)

Sport
- Sport: Weightlifting

Hwang Gyu-dong (born 30 December 1975) is a South Korean weightlifter. He competed in the men's bantamweight event at the 2000 Summer Olympics.
