= Karla Moreno =

Personal information
- Born: March 15, 1988 (age 38) Managua, Nicaragua
Medal record
Women's Weightlifting
Representing Nicaragua
Pan American Championships
Bronze medal – third place	2008 Callao	– 48 kg

Karla Moreno Rodríguez (born March 15, 1988, in Managua) is a weightlifter from Nicaragua.

At the 2008 Pan American Weightlifting Championships she won bronze in the 48 kg category, with a total of 143 kg.

She competed at the 2008 Summer Olympics, in the weight class of -48 kg, where she finished in 11th place, with a total of 150 kg.
