= Viktor Yansky =

Uzbekistani weightlifter (born 1969)

Personal information
- Nationality: Uzbekistani
- Born: 30 July 1969 (age 57) Samarkand, Uzbekistan

Sport
- Sport: Weightlifting

Viktor Yansky (born 30 July 1969) is an Uzbekistani weightlifter. He competed in the men's flyweight event at the 1996 Summer Olympics.
