= Thandava Murthy Muthu =

Indian weightlifter (born 1975)

Personal information
- Born: 21 January 1975 (age 51) Vellore, Tamil Nadu, India
- Height: 157 cm (5 ft 2 in)
- Weight: 55.76 kg (122.9 lb)

Sport
- Country: India
- Sport: Weightlifting
- Weight class: 56 kg
- Updated on 27 September 2016

Thandava Murthy Muthu (born 21 January 1975) is an Indian male weightlifter, competing in the 56 kg category and representing India at international competitions. He participated at the 2000 Summer Olympics in the 56 kg event. He competed at world championships, most recently at the 2001 World Weightlifting Championships.

He received the Arjuna Award in 2002.

== Major results ==
Year	Venue	Weight	Snatch (kg)				Clean & Jerk (kg)				Total	Rank
Year	Venue	Weight	1	2	3	Rank	1	2	3	Rank	Total	Rank
Summer Olympics
2000	Sydney, Australia	56 kg				—N/a				—N/a		16
World Championships
2001	Antalya, Turkey	56 kg	100	107.5	110	9	130	~~135~~	135	11	245	10
