= Mohammed Abdul-Monem =

Iraqi weightlifter (born 1981)

Personal information
- Full name: Mohammed Abdul-Monem Ali Al-Sharuee
- Born: 8 March 1981 (age 45)
- Height: 160 cm (5 ft 3 in)
- Weight: 55.96 kg (123.4 lb)

Sport
- Country: Iraq
- Sport: Weightlifting
- Weight class: 56 kg
- Team: National team
- Updated on 14 September 2016

Mohammed Abdul-Monem Ali Al-Sharuee (original name: محمد عبد المنعم علي; born 8 March 1981) is an Iraqi male weightlifter, competing in the 56 kg category and representing Iraq at international competitions. He participated at the 2004 Summer Olympics in the 56 kg event. He competed at world championships, most recently at the 2003 World Weightlifting Championships.

== Major results ==
Year	Venue	Weight	Snatch (kg)				Clean & Jerk (kg)				Total	Rank
Year	Venue	Weight	1	2	3	Rank	1	2	3	Rank	Total	Rank
Summer Olympics
2004	Athens, Greece	56 kg				—N/a				—N/a		10
World Championships
2003	Vancouver, Canada	56 kg	112.5	117.5	122.5	8	137.5	~~142.5~~	~~142.5~~	18	260	9
2001	Antalya, Turkey	56 kg	102.5	~~110~~	~~110~~	11	110	122.5	127.5	13	230	12
