= Campo de la Cruz =

Campo de la Cruz Real de la Cruz
- Municipality and town
- Flag Coat of arms

- Location of the municipality and town of Campo de la Cruz in the Atlántico Department of Colombia
- Coordinates: 10°22′40″N 74°52′53″W
- Country: Colombia
- Department: Atlántico Department

Government
  - Mayor: Richard Jose Gomez Martinez (Liberal Party)

Area
  - Total: 105 km^{2} (41 sq mi)

Population (Census 2018)
  - Total: 22,810
  - Density: 217/km^{2} (563/sq mi)
- Time zone: UTC-5 (Colombia Standard Time)

Campo de la Cruz (Spanish for "field [or countryside] of the cross") is a municipality and a town in the Colombian department of Atlántico. It is the fifth most populated town in the department and is situated on the west bank of the Magdalena river and at the southern part of the Department of Atlántico. By road, Campo de la Cruz is located 80 km to the south of Barranquilla. Originally a fishing village, it was formally founded in the 17th century during the colonial period as 'Puerto Real de la Cruz'. Once the town gained independence from the Spanish Empire, the name was changed to its current denomination, Campo de la Cruz. During the colonial time and the early republican period it was a small but still important fluvial port.
