= Sergey Istomin =

Kazakhstani weightlifter (born 1986)

Sergey Istomin (born January 24, 1986) is a Kazakh weightlifter.

== Biography ==
He competed in Weightlifting at the 2008 Summer Olympics in the 105 kg division finishing 8th with 406 kg.

At the 2010 Asian Games he ranked 3rd in the 105 kg category, with a total of 396 kg.

He is Asian Champion - 2011 in the 105 kg category, with a total of 397 kg.

He is 5 ft 11 inches tall and weighs 231 lb.
