= Yasuji Kikuzuma =

Japanese weightlifter

Personal information
- Nationality: Japanese
- Born: 30 May 1978 (age 47)

Sport
- Sport: Weightlifting

Yasuji Kikuzuma (菊妻 康司, Kikuzuma Yasuji; born 30 May 1978) is a Japanese weightlifter. He competed in the men's bantamweight event at the 2000 Summer Olympics.
