= Wu Wenxiong =

Chinese weightlifter (born 1981)

Personal information
- Born: February 11, 1981 (age 45)
- Height: 1.52 m (5 ft 0 in)
Medal record
Men's Weightlifting
Representing China
Olympic Games
Silver medal – second place	2000 Sydney	– 56 kg
Asian Championships
Silver medal – second place	2003 Qinhuangdao	– 56 kg
East Asian Games
Gold medal – first place	2001 Osaka	– 56 kg

Wu Wenxiong (Chinese: 吴文雄, born February 11, 1981) is a retired Chinese weightlifter who competed in the 56 kg class. He was fifth at the 1999 World Championships and won the silver medal at the 2000 Olympics in Sydney, Australia.

== See also ==
- China at the 2000 Summer Olympics
