= Luis Miguel Pineda =

Colombian weightlifter (born 1988)

Personal information
- Full name: Luis Miguel Pineda Madrid
- Nationality: Colombia
- Born: 3 August 1988 (age 38) Monteria, Córdoba, Colombia
- Height: 1.63 m (5 ft 4 in)
- Weight: 69 kg (152 lb)

Sport
- Sport: Weightlifting
- Event: 69 kg
- Club: Apartadó
- Coached by: Georgi Panchev
- Now coaching: Mauricio Gonzalez

Achievements and titles
- Olympic finals: Beijing 2008
- World finals: Campeón Mundial
- National finals: Campeón Juegos Nacionales

Luis Miguel Pineda Madrid (born 3 August 1988 in Montería, Córdoba) is a Colombian weightlifter. Pineda represented Colombia at the 2008 Summer Olympics in Beijing, where he competed for the men's lightweight category (69 kg), along with his teammate Edwin Mosquera. Pineda placed thirteenth in this event, as he successfully lifted 132 kg in the single-motion snatch, and hoisted 167 kg in the two-part, shoulder-to-overhead clean and jerk, for a total of 299 kg. He won the silver medal at the 2008 Pan American Weightlifting Championships.

== Major results ==
Year	Venue	Weight	Snatch (kg)				Clean & Jerk (kg)				Total	Rank
Year	Venue	Weight	1	2	3	Rank	1	2	3	Rank	Total	Rank
Pan American Weightlifting Championships
2008	Callao, Peru	69 kg	~~127~~	130	134	4	157	165	172	3rd place, bronze medalist(s)	306	2nd place, silver medalist(s)
