= Mohamed Faizal Baharom =

Malaysian weightlifter (born 1982)

Personal information
- Nationality: Malaysian
- Born: 4 January 1982 (age 44)

Sport
- Sport: Weightlifting

Mohamed Faizal Baharom (born 4 January 1982) is a Malaysian weightlifter. He competed in the men's bantamweight event at the 2004 Summer Olympics.
