= Sergio Rada =

Colombian weightlifter (born 1984)

Personal information
- Born: January 27, 1984 (age 41) Campo de la Cruz, Atlántico
- Height: 1.62 m (5 ft 4 in)
- Weight: 56 kg (123 lb)

Sport
- Country: Colombia
- Sport: Weightlifting
- Event: 56kg
- Updated on 26 July 2012

Sergio Armando Rada Rodriguez (born January 27, 1984) is a Colombian weightlifter. His personal best is 257 kg (2007). He was born in Campo de la Cruz, Department of Atlántico.

At the 2005 World Championships he ranked 9th in the 56 kg category, with a total of 253 kg. At the 2006 World Championships he ranked 11th in the 56 kg category, with a total of 256 kg.

At the 2006 South American Championships he won gold in the 56 kg category, with a total of 255 kg.

He competed in Weightlifting at the 2008 Summer Olympics in the 56 kg division finishing twelfth with 252 kg.

He is 5 ft 4 inches tall and weighs 123 lb.
