= Ruslan Makarov =

Uzbekistani weightlifter (born 1987)

Ruslan Makarov (born 19 January 1987, Tashkent region) is an Uzbekistani weightlifter. He competed at the 2012 Summer Olympics in the Men's 56 kg.
