= Khalil El-Maaoui =

Tunisian weightlifter (born 1988)

Personal information
- Born: September 12, 1988 (age 36); Tunis, Tunisia
- Height: 1.64 m (5 ft 4 1/2 in)
- Weight: 56 kg (123 lb)

Sport
- Country: Tunisia
- Sport: Weightlifting
- Event: 56 kg
- Updated on 26 July 2012

Khalil El-Maaoui (born September 12, 1988, Marsa, Tunis, Tunisia) is a Tunisian weightlifter. He qualified for the weightlifting event at the 2008 Summer Olympics (Men's 56 kg) and did not finish, and participated in the same event at the 2012 Summer Olympics but was also unable to finish.
