= Cha Kum-chol =

North Korean weightlifter (born 1987)

Medal record

Representing North Korea

Men's weightlifting

World Championships
Gold medal – first place	2007 Chiang Mai	– 56 kg
Bronze medal – third place	2010 Antalya	– 56 kg

Summer Universiade
Silver medal – second place	2013 Kazan	– 62 kg

- Cha Kum-chol
- Hangul: 차금철
- RR: Cha Geumcheol
- MR: Ch'a Kŭmch'ŏl

Cha Kum-Chol (Korean: 차금철; born July 19, 1987) is a North Korean weightlifter. His personal best combined lift is 283 kg.

At the 2007 World Championships he became world champion in the 56 kg category.

He competed in weightlifting at the 2008 Summer Olympics in the 56kg division, where he equalled his personal best to finish fifth.

He is 5 ft 2 in (1.57 m) tall and weighs 132 lb (60 kg).

Cha represents the April 25 Sports Team.
