= Ri Kyong-sok =

North Korean weightlifter (born 1981)

- Hangul: 리경석
- Hanja: 李景錫
- RR: Ri Gyeongseok
- MR: Ri Kyŏngsŏk

Ri Kyong-sok (born 14 August 1981) is a North Korean weightlifter. He competed at the 2008 Summer Olympics.
