= Yasunobu Sekikawa =

Japanese weightlifter

Personal information
- Born: March 21, 1980 (age 45)
- Height: 1.55 m (5 ft 1 in)
- Weight: 60 kg (130 lb)

Sport
- Country: Japan
- Sport: Weightlifting

Yasunobu Sekikawa (堰川 康信, Sekikawa Yasunobu) (born March 21, 1980) is a Japanese weightlifter.

He is 5 ft 1 inches tall and weighs 132 lb.

== Career ==
At the 2006 World Championships he ranked 17th in the 56 kg category, with a total of 246 kg. At the 2007 World Championships he ranked 14th in the 56 kg category, with a total of 250 kg.

=== Olympics ===
Sekikawa competed in Weightlifting at the 2008 Summer Olympics in the 56 kg division finishing eleventh, with 256 kg, beating his personal best by 6 kg.
