= Hoàng Anh Tuấn =

Vietnamese weightlifter (born 1985)

Personal information
- Born: February 12, 1985 (age 41) Quế Võ, Bắc Ninh, Vietnam
- Height: 1.52 m (5 ft 0 in)
- Weight: 56 kg (123 lb)
Medal record
Men's Weightlifting
Representing Vietnam
Olympic Games
Silver medal – second place	2008 Beijing	-56 kg
Asian Games
Silver medal – second place	2006 Doha	-56 kg
World Championships
Bronze medal – third place	2005 Doha	-56 kg
Bronze medal – third place	2006 Santo Domingo	-56 kg
SEA Games
Silver medal – second place	2007 Nakhon Ratchasima	56 kg

Hoàng Anh Tuấn (born 12 February 1985 in Bắc Ninh Province) is a Vietnamese weightlifter.

== Career ==
At the 2005 Junior World Championships, he won the silver medal in the men's -56 kg class, with a total of 276 kg. He participated in the men's -56 kg class at the 2005 World Weightlifting Championships and won the bronze medal, with a total of 279 kg.

Anh Tuấn participated in the men’s -56 kg class at the 2006 World Weightlifting Championships and won the bronze medal, finishing behind Li Zheng and Sergio Álvarez Boulet. He snatched 124 kg and jerked an additional 152 kg for a total of 276 kg, 4 kg behind winner Li. He also won a silver medal at the 2006 Asian Games, at 56 kg, lifting 128 kg in the snatch and 157 kg in the clean and jerk, for a total of 285 kg.

At the 2008 Asian Weightlifting Championships, he won the gold medal in the men's -56 kg class, with a total of 279 kg. He won the silver medal at the 2008 Summer Olympics after lifting a total of 290 kg, and was named 2008 Vietnam Sportsman of the Year.

From 18 September 2010, he was handed a two year ban for testing positive with oxilofrine, a substance banned by World Anti-Doping Agency in competitive sports.

After retiring from competitive weightlifting, he became a coach, training his fellow athletes to participate in international competitions such as Asian Games.
