= Wu Meijin =

Chinese weightlifter (born 1980)

Personal information
- Born: April 25, 1980 (age 46) Ruian, Zhejiang, China
- Height: 1.57 m (5 ft 2 in)
Medal record
Men's Weightlifting
Olympic Games
| Silver medal – second place | 2004 Athens | – 56 kg |
World Championships
| Gold medal – first place | 2002 Warsaw | – 56 kg |
| Gold medal – first place | 2003 Vancouver | – 56 kg |
Asian Games Total
| Gold medal – first place | 2002 Busan | – 56 kg |

Wu Meijin (simplified Chinese: 吴美锦; traditional Chinese: 吳美錦; pinyin: Wú Měijǐn; born April 25, 1980) is a Chinese weightlifter who competed in the Men's 56 kilogram weight class at the 2004 Summer Olympics and won the silver medal, lifting 287.5 kilograms in total. He is the 2002 and 2003 world champion. He is now the executive coach of Li Wenwen, the champion of women's super heavyweight in Tokyo 2020 Olympic Games.

Wu Meijin kicked off the 2003 World Weightlifting Championships by sweeping the men's 56-kg category with a 127.5-kg snatch and a 160-kg clean and jerk.
