= Li Zheng (weightlifter) =

Chinese weightlifter (born 1986)

Personal information
- Born: 18 January 1986 (age 40)
Medal record
Men's Weightlifting
Representing China
World Championships
Gold medal – first place	2006 Santo Domingo	56 kg
Silver medal – second place	2007 Chiang Mai	56 kg
Asian Games
Gold medal – first place	2006 Doha	56 kg

Li Zheng (Chinese: 李争; pinyin: Lǐ Zhēng; born 18 January 1986) is a Chinese weightlifter.

Li participated in the men's 56 kg (123 lb) class at the 2006 World Weightlifting Championships. He won the gold medal, snatching 128 kg (282 lb) and jerking an additional 152 kg (335 lb) for a total of 280 kg (620 lb).
