= Vito Dellino =

Italian weightlifter (born 1982)

Medal record

Men's weightlifting

Representing Italy

European Championships
Silver medal – second place	2009 Bucharest	56 kg

Vito Dellino (born 16 April 1982) is an Italian weightlifter.

He competed in Weightlifting at the 2008 Summer Olympics in the 56 kg division finishing fourteenth with 247 kg. This beat his previous personal best by 12 kg.

At the 2009 European Weightlifting Championships he won gold in the clean and jerk, and overall silver in the 56 kg category with a total of 247 kg.

He is 5 ft 3 inches tall and weighs 128 lb.
