= Yang Chin-yi =

Taiwanese weightlifter (born 1981)

Personal information
- Born: May 15, 1981 (age 45)
Medal record
Asian Games Total
Bronze medal – third place	2002 Busan	– 56 kg

Yang Chin-yi (Chinese: 楊璟翊; born 15 May 1981) is a Taiwanese weightlifter.

At the 2004 Summer Olympics he participated in the 56 kg category, but did not finish.

He competed in Weightlifting at the 2008 Summer Olympics in the 56 kg division representing Chinese Taipei finishing fourth overall with a personal best combined lift of 285 kg. His previous best was 277.5 kg.
