= Masaharu Yamada =

Japanese weightlifter (born 1980)

Personal information
- Born: May 1, 1980 (age 45)
- Height: 1.55 m (5 ft 1 in)
- Weight: 56 kg (123 lb)

Sport
- Country: Japan
- Sport: Weightlifting

Masaharu Yamada (山田 政晴, Yamada Masaharu; born May 1, 1980 in Gunma) is a Japanese weightlifter.

He competed in Weightlifting at the 2008 Summer Olympics in the 56 kg division finishing ninth, with a new personal best of 259 kg. He beat his previous best by 6 kg.

He is 5 ft 1 inches tall and weighs 130 lb.
