= Sergio Álvarez (weightlifter) =

Cuban weightlifter (born 1979)

Personal information
- Born: 11 October 1979 (age 46) Matanzas, Cuba
- Weight: 56 kg (123 lb)

Sport
- Country: Cuba
- Sport: Weightlifting
- Event: 56 kg
Medal record
Men's weightlifting
Representing Cuba
World Championships
Silver medal – second place	2006 Santo Domingo	– 56 kg
Bronze medal – third place	2009 Goyang	– 56 kg
Pan American Games
Gold medal – first place	1999 Winnipeg	– 56 kg
Gold medal – first place	2007 Rio de Janeiro	– 56 kg
Gold medal – first place	2011 Guadalajara	– 56 kg
Pan American Championships
Gold medal – first place	2010 Guatemala City	– 56 kg
Central American and Caribbean Games
Gold medal – first place	2006 Cartagena	– 56 kg
- Updated on 26 July 2012

Sergio Álvarez Boulet (born 11 October 1979) is a Cuban weightlifter.

He represented Cuba at the 2000 Summer Olympics, ranking 5th.

He participated in the men's -56 kg class at the 2006 World Weightlifting Championships and won the silver medal, finishing behind Li Zheng. He snatched 123 kg and clean and jerked an additional 156 kg for a total of 279 kg, only 1 kg behind winner Li.

He twice won the gold medal at the Pan American Games in the 56 kg category.

At the 2008 Summer Olympics he ranked 6th in the 56 kg category, with a total of 272 kg.
