= Wang Shin-yuan =

Taiwanese weightlifter (born 1976)

Personal information
- Born: 23 June 1976 (age 50)
Medal record
Men's Weightlifting
Representing Chinese Taipei
Asian Games
Silver medal – second place	1998 Bangkok	– 56 kg
Silver medal – second place	2002 Busan	– 56 kg

Wang Shin-yuan (Chinese: 王信淵; pinyin: Wáng Xìnyuān; born 23 June 1976) is a Taiwanese weightlifter. His personal best is 282.5 kg.

He competed in Weightlifting at the 2008 Summer Olympics in the 56 kg division representing Chinese Taipei. He finished seventh with 265 kg.

He is 5 ft 2 inches tall and weighs 130 lb.
