= 2010 World Weightlifting Championships – Women's 75 kg =

The women's competition in the heavyweight (– 75 kg) division was held on 22 and 23 September 2010.

== Schedule ==
Date	Time	Event
22 September 2010	14:00	Group C
23 September 2010	12:00	Group B
23 September 2010	17:00	Group A

== Medalists ==
Event	Gold		Silver		Bronze	
Snatch	Svetlana Podobedova (KAZ)	134 kg	Natalya Zabolotnaya (RUS)	133 kg	Nadezhda Evstyukhina (RUS)	123 kg
Clean & Jerk	Svetlana Podobedova (KAZ)	161 kg	Nadezhda Evstyukhina (RUS)	160 kg	Natalya Zabolotnaya (RUS)	160 kg
Total	Svetlana Podobedova (KAZ)	295 kg	Natalya Zabolotnaya (RUS)	293 kg	Nadezhda Evstyukhina (RUS)	283 kg

== Records ==
Prior to this competition, the existing world records were as follows.

World record	Snatch	Svetlana Podobedova (KAZ)	132 kg	Goyang, South Korea	28 November 2009
World record	Clean & Jerk	Svetlana Podobedova (KAZ)	160 kg	Goyang, South Korea	28 November 2009
World record	Total	Svetlana Podobedova (KAZ)	292 kg	Goyang, South Korea	28 November 2009

== Results ==
Rank	Athlete	Group	Body weight	Snatch (kg)				Clean & Jerk (kg)				Total
Rank	Athlete	Group	Body weight	1	2	3	Rank	1	2	3	Rank	Total
1st place, gold medalist(s)	Svetlana Podobedova (KAZ)	A	74.67	125	130	134	1st place, gold medalist(s)	155	161	—	1st place, gold medalist(s)	295
2nd place, silver medalist(s)	Natalya Zabolotnaya (RUS)	A	74.97	128	~~133~~	133	2nd place, silver medalist(s)	153	160	~~163~~	3rd place, bronze medalist(s)	293
3rd place, bronze medalist(s)	Nadezhda Evstyukhina (RUS)	A	73.86	123	~~127~~	~~128~~	3rd place, bronze medalist(s)	150	~~157~~	160	2nd place, silver medalist(s)	283
4	Iryna Kulesha (BLR)	A	74.57	115	~~120~~	120	4	135	~~140~~	~~140~~	6	255
5	Li Xia (CHN)	A	74.31	~~113~~	113	~~120~~	5	~~130~~	130	135	5	248
6	Nadiya Myronyuk (UKR)	A	74.46	105	108	111	7	130	134	136	4	247
7	Ubaldina Valoyes (COL)	A	74.33	105	108	110	9	130	134	~~137~~	8	244
8	Tatyana Khromova (KAZ)	A	74.86	107	110	~~113~~	10	~~133~~	~~133~~	133	9	243
9	Abeer Abdelrahman (EGY)	A	74.98	107	—	—	11	135	—	—	7	242
10	Yuliya Novakovich (BLR)	B	74.28	~~105~~	105	110	8	120	~~126~~	126	12	236
11	Khanittha Petanang (THA)	B	74.79	95	99	~~101~~	17	125	128	131	10	230
12	Wang Ya-jhen (TPE)	B	71.54	~~97~~	97	100	13	125	~~129~~	129	11	229
13	Marie-Ève Beauchemin-Nadeau (CAN)	B	74.74	~~93~~	93	98	20	125	~~129~~	~~129~~	13	223
14	Jaqueline Ferreira (BRA)	C	74.09	95	100	~~103~~	15	116	~~121~~	122	15	222
15	Lim Ji-hye (KOR)	B	74.94	~~97~~	~~97~~	98	21	~~124~~	124	~~127~~	14	222
16	Yarvanis Herrera (VEN)	C	73.19	98	~~102~~	~~102~~	18	118	121	~~122~~	16	219
17	María Álvarez (VEN)	C	73.30	96	~~100~~	100	14	116	~~120~~	~~120~~	20	216
18	Erin Wallace (USA)	B	74.44	95	98	~~99~~	19	115	117	~~119~~	18	215
19	Kazue Imahoko (JPN)	B	74.61	100	~~103~~	~~103~~	16	~~115~~	115	~~117~~	21	215
20	Yessica Solís (COL)	B	74.72	97	~~100~~	~~100~~	23	~~117~~	~~117~~	117	19	214
21	Damaris Aguirre (MEX)	B	74.60	91	~~96~~	~~97~~	24	~~121~~	121	~~125~~	17	212
22	Mandy Wedow (GER)	C	73.89	94	97	~~99~~	22	~~114~~	114	~~116~~	22	211
23	Katelynn Williams (CAN)	C	71.19	~~83~~	83	88	25	103	108	~~113~~	23	196
24	Annika Berntsson (SWE)	C	72.24	84	87	~~90~~	26	104	~~106~~	~~106~~	25	191
25	Rachel Crass (USA)	C	74.95	83	~~86~~	~~86~~	28	101	104	106	24	189
26	Premila Devi Khwairakpam (IND)	C	72.75	~~78~~	78	81	29	100	104	~~106~~	26	185
27	Almira Lizde (BIH)	C	73.48	~~80~~	80	83	27	~~95~~	~~95~~	95	27	178
—	Lydia Valentín (ESP)	A	73.42	~~112~~	112	~~117~~	6	~~135~~	~~135~~	~~135~~	—	—
—	Iuliia Vlasenko (UKR)	B	74.48	98	101	~~103~~	12	~~124~~	~~124~~	~~124~~	—	—
—	Madias Nzesso (CMR)	B	74.33	92	96	~~99~~	—	115	~~120~~	~~122~~	—	—
—	Patricia Figueroa (PUR)	C	74.72	87	90	~~94~~	—	110	115	~~120~~	—	—
—	Byambadorjiin Uranchimeg (MGL)	C	74.92	~~80~~	80	~~81~~	—	~~100~~	~~100~~	~~100~~	—	—

== New records ==
Snatch	133 kg	Natalya Zabolotnaya (RUS)	WR
Snatch	134 kg	Svetlana Podobedova (KAZ)	WR
Clean & Jerk	161 kg	Svetlana Podobedova (KAZ)	WR
Total	293 kg	Natalya Zabolotnaya (RUS)	WR
Total	295 kg	Svetlana Podobedova (KAZ)	WR
