= 2008 Asian Weightlifting Championships =

International weightlifting competition

The 2008 Asian Weightlifting Championships were held at Ishikawa Sports Center in Kanazawa City, Ishikawa Prefecture Japan between April 26 and May 5 2008. It was the 39th men's and 20th women's championship. Much of the responsibility for the event lay with the Japan Weightlifting Association overlooked by the Asian Weightlifting Federation. The event had major significance for Asian weightlifters as the championships were the official qualifications for Weightlifting at the 2008 Summer Olympics.

== Medal summary ==
=== Men ===
Event	Gold		Silver		Bronze	
56 kg
Snatch	Hoàng Anh Tuấn; Vietnam	126 kg	Amirul Hamizan Ibrahim; Malaysia	121 kg	Chen Biao; China	120 kg
Clean & Jerk	Wu Jingbiao; China	154 kg	Chen Biao; China	153 kg	Hoàng Anh Tuấn; Vietnam	153 kg
Total	Hoàng Anh Tuấn; Vietnam	279 kg	Wu Jingbiao; China	274 kg	Chen Biao; China	273 kg
62 kg
Snatch	Zhang Jie; China	147 kg	Ümürbek Bazarbaýew; Turkmenistan	136 kg	Eko Yuli Irawan; Indonesia	135 kg
Clean & Jerk	Zhang Jie; China	179 kg	Eko Yuli Irawan; Indonesia	170 kg	Tolkunbek Hudaýbergenow; Turkmenistan	163 kg
Total	Zhang Jie; China	326 kg WR	Eko Yuli Irawan; Indonesia	305 kg	Ümürbek Bazarbaýew; Turkmenistan	296 kg
69 kg
Snatch	Tang Fei; China	140 kg	Kim Yoon-han; South Korea	138 kg	Kuanysh Rakhatov; Kazakhstan	137 kg
Clean & Jerk	Tang Fei; China	177 kg	Yoshito Shintani; Japan	176 kg	Edi Kurniawan; Indonesia	170 kg
Total	Tang Fei; China	317 kg	Yoshito Shintani; Japan	306 kg	Edi Kurniawan; Indonesia	305 kg
77 kg
Snatch	Lü Xiaojun; China	158 kg	Lu Changliang; China	152 kg	Sohrab Moradi; Iran	146 kg
Clean & Jerk	Lu Changliang; China	195 kg	Lü Xiaojun; China	188 kg	Kraisorn Dadtuyawat; Thailand	180 kg
Total	Lu Changliang; China	347 kg	Lü Xiaojun; China	346 kg	Sohrab Moradi; Iran	325 kg
85 kg
Snatch	Lee Se-won; South Korea	162 kg	Zhang Shichong; China	160 kg	Ulanbek Moldodosov; Kyrgyzstan	158 kg
Clean & Jerk	Zhang Shichong; China	200 kg	Ulanbek Moldodosov; Kyrgyzstan	192 kg	Mansurbek Chashemov; Uzbekistan	191 kg
Total	Zhang Shichong; China	360 kg	Lee Se-won; South Korea	350 kg	Ulanbek Moldodosov; Kyrgyzstan	350 kg
94 kg
Snatch	Asghar Ebrahimi; Iran	180 kg	Miskander Momynbekov; Kyrgyzstan	167 kg	Suthiphon Watthanakasikam; Thailand	161 kg
Clean & Jerk	Asghar Ebrahimi; Iran	205 kg	Song Jong-shik; South Korea	200 kg	Hsieh Wei-chun; Chinese Taipei	199 kg
Total	Asghar Ebrahimi; Iran	385 kg	Hsieh Wei-chun; Chinese Taipei	357 kg	Almas Uteshov; Kazakhstan	355 kg
105 kg
Snatch	Niti Khameiam; Thailand	157 kg	Aleksei Dudin; Kyrgyzstan	156 kg	Ramzi Al-Mahrous; Saudi Arabia	150 kg
Clean & Jerk	Niti Khameiam; Thailand	191 kg	Aleksei Dudin; Kyrgyzstan	190 kg	Ramzi Al-Mahrous; Saudi Arabia	180 kg
Total	Niti Khameiam; Thailand	348 kg	Aleksei Dudin; Kyrgyzstan	346 kg	Ramzi Al-Mahrous; Saudi Arabia	330 kg
+105 kg
Snatch	Rashid Sharifi; Iran	190 kg	Mohammad Salehi; Iran	185 kg	Kazuomi Ota; Japan	175 kg
Clean & Jerk	Rashid Sharifi; Iran	236 kg	Mohammad Salehi; Iran	235 kg	Mohammad Ali; Syria	210 kg
Total	Rashid Sharifi; Iran	426 kg	Mohammad Salehi; Iran	420 kg	Kazuomi Ota; Japan	385 kg

=== Women ===
Event	Gold		Silver		Bronze	
48 kg
Snatch	Wang Mingjuan; China	87 kg	Ngô Thị Nga; Vietnam	83 kg	Shoko Sumida; Japan	78 kg
Clean & Jerk	Wang Mingjuan; China	101 kg	Ngô Thị Nga; Vietnam	95 kg	Shoko Sumida; Japan	92 kg
Total	Wang Mingjuan; China	188 kg	Ngô Thị Nga; Vietnam	178 kg	Shoko Sumida; Japan	170 kg
53 kg
Snatch	Suda Chaleephay; Thailand	93 kg	Raema Lisa Rumbewas; Indonesia	91 kg	Cen Lijuan; China	91 kg
Clean & Jerk	Cen Lijuan; China	117 kg	Svetlana Cheremshanova; Kazakhstan	115 kg	Suda Chaleephay; Thailand	114 kg
Total	Cen Lijuan; China	208 kg	Suda Chaleephay; Thailand	207 kg	Svetlana Cheremshanova; Kazakhstan	205 kg
58 kg
Snatch	Li Xueying; China	102 kg	Lin Wan-hsuan; Chinese Taipei	95 kg	Patmawati Abdul Hamid; Indonesia	91 kg
Clean & Jerk	Li Xueying; China	125 kg	Lin Wan-hsuan; Chinese Taipei	113 kg	Sureerat Thongsuk; Thailand	112 kg
Total	Li Xueying; China	227 kg	Lin Wan-hsuan; Chinese Taipei	208 kg	Sureerat Thongsuk; Thailand	202 kg
63 kg
Snatch	Liu Haixia; China	104 kg	Nguyễn Thị Thiết; Vietnam	101 kg	Yelena Shadrina; Kazakhstan	99 kg
Clean & Jerk	Liu Haixia; China	136 kg	Nguyễn Thị Thiết; Vietnam	124 kg	Yelena Shadrina; Kazakhstan	123 kg
Total	Liu Haixia; China	240 kg	Nguyễn Thị Thiết; Vietnam	225 kg	Yelena Shadrina; Kazakhstan	222 kg
69 kg
Snatch	Liu Chunhong; China	117 kg	Monika Devi; India	100 kg	Kao Ya-chun; Chinese Taipei	98 kg
Clean & Jerk	Liu Chunhong; China	145 kg	Kao Ya-chun; Chinese Taipei	124 kg	Monika Devi; India	122 kg
Total	Liu Chunhong; China	262 kg	Kao Ya-chun; Chinese Taipei	222 kg	Monika Devi; India	222 kg
75 kg
Snatch	Cao Lei; China	121 kg	Alla Vazhenina; Kazakhstan	120 kg	Yang Houqin; Macau	97 kg
Clean & Jerk	Cao Lei; China	155 kg	Alla Vazhenina; Kazakhstan	146 kg	Sinta Darmariani; Indonesia	128 kg
Total	Cao Lei; China	276 kg	Alla Vazhenina; Kazakhstan	266 kg	Sinta Darmariani; Indonesia	224 kg
+75 kg
Snatch	Alexandra Aborneva; Kazakhstan	110 kg	Annipa Moontar; Thailand	110 kg	Mami Shimamoto; Japan	108 kg
Clean & Jerk	Mami Shimamoto; Japan	142 kg	Fumiko Jonai; Japan	140 kg	Annipa Moontar; Thailand	137 kg
Total	Mami Shimamoto; Japan	250 kg	Annipa Moontar; Thailand	247 kg	Alexandra Aborneva; Kazakhstan	246 kg

== Medal table ==
Ranking by Big (Total result) medals

Rank	Nation	Gold	Silver	Bronze	Total
1	China	10	2	1	13
2	Iran	2	1	1	4
3	Thailand	1	2	1	4
4	Vietnam	1	2	0	3
5	Japan	1	1	2	4
6	Chinese Taipei	0	3	0	3
7	Kazakhstan	0	1	4	5
8	Indonesia	0	1	2	3
9	Kyrgyzstan	0	1	1	2
10	South Korea	0	1	0	1
11	India	0	0	1	1
11	Saudi Arabia	0	0	1	1
11	Turkmenistan	0	0	1	1
Totals (13 entries)		15	15	15	45

Ranking by all medals: Big (Total result) and Small (Snatch and Clean & Jerk)

Rank	Nation	Gold	Silver	Bronze	Total
1	China	29	6	3	38
2	Iran	6	3	2	11
3	Thailand	4	3	6	13
4	Vietnam	2	6	1	9
5	Japan	2	3	6	11
6	Kazakhstan	1	4	7	12
7	South Korea	1	3	0	4
8	Chinese Taipei	0	6	2	8
9	Kyrgyzstan	0	5	2	7
10	Indonesia	0	3	6	9
11	India	0	1	2	3
11	Turkmenistan	0	1	2	3
13	Malaysia	0	1	0	1
14	Saudi Arabia	0	0	3	3
15	Macau	0	0	1	1
15	Syria	0	0	1	1
15	Uzbekistan	0	0	1	1
Totals (17 entries)		45	45	45	135

== Participating nations ==
175 athletes from 26 nations competed.

- China (14)
- Chinese Taipei (9)
- Hong Kong (1)
- India (10)
- Indonesia (13)
- Iran (7)
- Iraq (8)
- Japan (15)
- Jordan (1)
- Kazakhstan (6)
- Kyrgyzstan (8)
- Macau (1)
- Malaysia (6)
- Mongolia (7)
- Nepal (1)
- Pakistan (2)
- Qatar (4)
- Saudi Arabia (8)
- South Korea (7)
- Sri Lanka (1)
- Syria (2)
- Tajikistan (3)
- Thailand (15)
- Turkmenistan (8)
- Uzbekistan (8)
- Vietnam (10)
