= 2009 World Weightlifting Championships – Women's 75 kg =

The women's competition in the heavyweight (– 75 kg) division was staged on November 27 and November 28, 2009.

== Schedule ==
Date	Time	Event
27 November 2009	11:00	Group B
28 November 2009	16:00	Group A

== Medalists ==
Event	Gold		Silver		Bronze	
Snatch	Svetlana Podobedova (KAZ)	132 kg	Cao Lei (CHN)	121 kg	Lydia Valentín (ESP)	112 kg
Clean & Jerk	Svetlana Podobedova (KAZ)	160 kg	Cao Lei (CHN)	148 kg	Abeer Abdelrahman (EGY)	142 kg
Total	Svetlana Podobedova (KAZ)	292 kg	Cao Lei (CHN)	269 kg	Abeer Abdelrahman (EGY)	252 kg

== Records ==
Prior to this competition, the existing world records were as follows.

World Record	Snatch	Natalya Zabolotnaya (RUS)	131 kg	Chiang Mai, Thailand	25 September 2007
World Record	Clean & Jerk	Liu Chunhong (CHN)	159 kg	Doha, Qatar	13 November 2005
World Record	Total	Svetlana Podobedova (RUS)	286 kg	Hangzhou, China	2 June 2006

== Results ==
Rank	Athlete	Group	Body weight	Snatch (kg)				Clean & Jerk (kg)				Total
Rank	Athlete	Group	Body weight	1	2	3	Rank	1	2	3	Rank	Total
1st place, gold medalist(s)	Svetlana Podobedova (KAZ)	A	74.91	125	130	132	1st place, gold medalist(s)	150	155	160	1st place, gold medalist(s)	292
2nd place, silver medalist(s)	Cao Lei (CHN)	A	72.43	112	118	121	2nd place, silver medalist(s)	140	145	148	2nd place, silver medalist(s)	269
3rd place, bronze medalist(s)	Abeer Abdelrahman (EGY)	A	74.17	105	110	~~112~~	4	135	140	142	3rd place, bronze medalist(s)	252
4	Tatyana Khromova (KAZ)	A	74.72	~~110~~	110	~~115~~	5	~~135~~	~~135~~	135	5	245
5	Lydia Valentín (ESP)	A	74.58	112	~~118~~	~~119~~	3rd place, bronze medalist(s)	130	~~136~~	~~136~~	8	242
6	Nadiya Myronyuk (UKR)	A	74.21	105	109	~~111~~	6	126	~~131~~	131	7	240
7	Sinta Darmariani (INA)	A	71.13	97	100	~~103~~	7	128	132	135	4	235
8	Lim Ji-hye (KOR)	A	74.83	~~97~~	97	~~101~~	8	124	128	132	6	229
9	Khanittha Petanang (THA)	B	74.53	91	93	95	9	117	122	~~126~~	9	217
10	Yang Houqin (MAC)	B	74.57	90	93	95	10	107	111	115	11	210
11	Caroline Girard (CAN)	B	74.84	88	91	~~94~~	11	113	~~116~~	116	10	207
12	Raquel Alonso (ESP)	B	74.33	85	~~88~~	~~88~~	13	~~105~~	107	111	12	196
13	Rika Nakamura (JPN)	B	74.53	84	~~86~~	86	12	106	108	110	13	196
14	Almira Lizde (BIH)	B	74.85	~~80~~	80	83	14	100	~~102~~	~~102~~	14	183
—	Damaris Aguirre (MEX)	A	74.62	~~103~~	~~103~~	~~103~~	—	~~127~~	—	—	—	—
DQ	Hripsime Khurshudyan (ARM)	A	74.26	120	~~125~~	~~125~~	—	141	~~147~~	147	—	—

== New records ==
Snatch	132 kg	Svetlana Podobedova (KAZ)	WR
Clean & Jerk	160 kg	Svetlana Podobedova (KAZ)	WR
Total	287 kg	Svetlana Podobedova (KAZ)	WR
Total	292 kg	Svetlana Podobedova (KAZ)	WR
