= 2007 World Weightlifting Championships – Women's 75 kg =

The women's competition in 75 kg division was staged on September 25, 2007.

== Schedule ==
Date	Time	Event
25 September 2007	09:30	Group C
25 September 2007	12:00	Group B
25 September 2007	14:30	Group A

== Medalists ==
Event	Gold		Silver		Bronze	
Snatch	Natalya Zabolotnaya (RUS)	131 kg	Cao Lei (CHN)	128 kg	Nadezhda Evstyukhina (RUS)	128 kg
Clean & Jerk	Cao Lei (CHN)	158 kg	Nadezhda Evstyukhina (RUS)	150 kg	Natalya Zabolotnaya (RUS)	150 kg
Total	Cao Lei (CHN)	286 kg	Natalya Zabolotnaya (RUS)	281 kg	Nadezhda Evstyukhina (RUS)	278 kg

== Records ==
Prior to this competition, the existing world records were as follows.

World Record	Snatch	Natalya Zabolotnaya (RUS)	130 kg	Doha, Qatar	13 November 2005
World Record	Clean & Jerk	Liu Chunhong (CHN)	159 kg	Doha, Qatar	13 November 2005
World Record	Total	Svetlana Podobedova (RUS)	286 kg	Hangzhou, China	2 June 2006

== Results ==
Rank	Athlete	Group	Body weight	Snatch (kg)				Clean & Jerk (kg)				Total
Rank	Athlete	Group	Body weight	1	2	3	Rank	1	2	3	Rank	Total
1st place, gold medalist(s)	Cao Lei (CHN)	A	73.51	121	125	128	2nd place, silver medalist(s)	153	158	~~160~~	1st place, gold medalist(s)	286
2nd place, silver medalist(s)	Natalya Zabolotnaya (RUS)	A	74.45	124	127	131	1st place, gold medalist(s)	150	~~156~~	~~156~~	3rd place, bronze medalist(s)	281
3rd place, bronze medalist(s)	Nadezhda Evstyukhina (RUS)	A	73.80	120	125	128	3rd place, bronze medalist(s)	150	~~158~~	~~159~~	2nd place, silver medalist(s)	278
4	Hripsime Khurshudyan (ARM)	A	74.27	~~110~~	110	115	4	130	135	~~140~~	6	250
5	Ubaldina Valoyes (COL)	A	72.71	105	~~110~~	~~110~~	7	~~132~~	132	135	5	242
6	Lydia Valentín (ESP)	A	74.67	105	110	~~115~~	5	125	130	~~135~~	8	240
7	Nguyễn Thị Phương Loan (VIE)	B	73.49	100	~~103~~	103	9	125	128	130	7	233
8	Claret Bellorín (VEN)	A	74.06	100	103	~~105~~	10	120	~~124~~	124	12	227
9	Iryna Kulesha (BLR)	B	73.77	100	102	105	8	115	121	~~128~~	13	226
10	Tatyana Khromova (KAZ)	B	74.32	95	100	106	6	115	120	~~130~~	14	226
11	Nadiya Myronyuk (UKR)	A	74.71	95	100	~~103~~	13	120	125	~~130~~	9	225
12	Tetyana Zhukova (UKR)	A	74.42	95	100	103	11	120	~~125~~	~~125~~	15	223
13	Damaris Aguirre (MEX)	A	74.84	~~98~~	98	~~102~~	14	125	~~128~~	~~128~~	10	223
14	Yvonne Kranz (GER)	A	74.99	~~98~~	~~98~~	98	16	125	~~130~~	~~130~~	11	223
15	Cinthya Domínguez (MEX)	B	74.95	~~95~~	98	~~101~~	15	115	~~118~~	~~121~~	18	213
16	Sumati Devi (IND)	C	74.73	85	90	92	21	115	120	~~122~~	16	212
17	Doreen Fullhart (USA)	B	74.79	96	99	101	12	107	~~110~~	110	24	211
18	Kazue Imahoko (JPN)	B	73.86	~~95~~	95	~~99~~	18	~~112~~	112	~~115~~	19	207
19	Natallia Ivanenka (BLR)	B	74.07	90	95	~~98~~	19	105	112	~~115~~	21	207
20	Nadia Szamańska (POL)	B	74.25	~~95~~	95	~~98~~	20	~~110~~	110	112	22	207
21	Yang Houqin (MAC)	C	74.36	90	95	97	17	110	~~115~~	~~117~~	23	207
22	Desislava Bozhilova (BUL)	B	73.76	90	~~95~~	~~95~~	22	110	~~115~~	115	17	205
23	Irina Vlassova (KAZ)	B	73.94	85	~~90~~	90	23	112	~~117~~	~~117~~	20	202
24	Babalwa Ndleleni (RSA)	C	74.39	82	87	~~90~~	24	107	~~112~~	~~112~~	25	194
25	Ernestina Familia (DOM)	C	73.47	76	~~80~~	80	26	95	100	103	26	183
26	Martina Szepesi (HUN)	C	73.15	~~75~~	75	80	25	97	102	~~105~~	27	182
—	Sinta Darmariani (INA)	A	71.22	~~100~~	~~100~~	~~100~~	—	130	135	~~137~~	4	—
DQ	Naw Ju Ni (MYA)	B	72.35	87	93	~~97~~	—	110	115	120	—	—

== New records ==
Snatch	131 kg	Natalya Zabolotnaya (RUS)	WR
