= Weightlifting at the 2010 Asian Games – Women's 75 kg =

Women's 75 kg at the 2010 Asian Games
- Venue: Dongguan Arena
- Date: 18 November 2010
- Competitors: 9 from 8 nations

Medalists
gold medal	Svetlana Podobedova	Kazakhstan
silver medal	Cao Lei	China
bronze medal	Tatyana Khromova	Kazakhstan

The women's 75 kilograms event at the 2010 Asian Games took place on 18 November 2010 at Dongguan Arena.

== Schedule ==
All times are China Standard Time (UTC+08:00)

Date	Time	Event
Thursday, 18 November 2010	19:00	Group A

== Records ==
Prior to this competition, the existing world, Asian and Games records were as follows.

World Record	Snatch	Svetlana Podobedova (KAZ)	134 kg	Antalya, Turkey	22 September 2010
World Record	Clean & Jerk	Svetlana Podobedova (KAZ)	161 kg	Antalya, Turkey	22 September 2010
World Record	Total	Svetlana Podobedova (KAZ)	295 kg	Antalya, Turkey	22 September 2010
Asian Record	Snatch	Svetlana Podobedova (KAZ)	134 kg	Antalya, Turkey	22 September 2010
Asian Record	Clean & Jerk	Svetlana Podobedova (KAZ)	161 kg	Antalya, Turkey	22 September 2010
Asian Record	Total	Svetlana Podobedova (KAZ)	295 kg	Antalya, Turkey	22 September 2010
Games Record	Snatch	Cao Lei (CHN)	120 kg	Doha, Qatar	5 December 2006
Games Record	Clean & Jerk	Sun Ruiping (CHN)	152 kg	Busan, South Korea	7 October 2002
Games Record	Total	Cao Lei (CHN)	272 kg	Doha, Qatar	5 December 2006

== Results ==
Legend

- NM — No mark

Rank	Athlete	Group	Body weight	Snatch (kg)				Clean & Jerk (kg)				Total
Rank	Athlete	Group	Body weight	1	2	3	Result	1	2	3	Result	Total
1st place, gold medalist(s)	Svetlana Podobedova (KAZ)	A	74.79	125	130	—	130	150	157	—	157	287
2nd place, silver medalist(s)	Cao Lei (CHN)	A	72.05	110	115	118	118	137	143	147	147	265
3rd place, bronze medalist(s)	Tatyana Khromova (KAZ)	A	74.75	107	112	115	115	135	~~141~~	~~141~~	135	250
4	Kim Un-ju (PRK)	A	74.75	~~103~~	103	107	107	~~138~~	138	~~144~~	138	245
5	Lim Ji-hye (KOR)	A	74.82	97	103	~~106~~	103	125	~~131~~	131	131	234
6	Khanittha Petanang (THA)	A	74.60	~~95~~	95	~~99~~	95	125	130	134	134	229
7	Nguyễn Thị Phương Loan (VIE)	A	70.55	~~98~~	98	~~103~~	98	125	130	~~133~~	130	228
8	Thuraia Sobh (SYR)	A	74.45	80	85	90	90	105	111	~~115~~	111	201
—	Yang Houqin (MAC)	A	73.26	40	—	—	40	—	—	—	—	NM

== New records ==
The following records were established during the competition.

Snatch	125	Svetlana Podobedova (KAZ)	GR
Snatch	130	Svetlana Podobedova (KAZ)	GR
Clean & Jerk	157	Svetlana Podobedova (KAZ)	GR
Total	280	Svetlana Podobedova (KAZ)	GR
Total	287	Svetlana Podobedova (KAZ)	GR
