= Weightlifting at the 2008 Summer Olympics – Women's 75 kg =

Women's 75 kg at the Games of the XXIX Olympiad
- Date: 15 August 2008
- Competitors: 12 from 11 nations

Medalists
1st place, gold medalist(s)		Alla Vazhenina	Kazakhstan
2nd place, silver medalist(s)		Lydia Valentín	Spain
3rd place, bronze medalist(s)		Damaris Aguirre	Mexico

The women's 75 kilograms weightlifting event was the sixth women's event at the weightlifting competition, with competitors limited to a maximum of 75 kilograms of body mass. The whole competition took place on August 15 at 15:30. This event was the ninth Weightlifting event to conclude.

Each lifter performed in both the snatch and clean and jerk lifts, with the final score being the sum of the lifter's best result in each. The athlete received three attempts in each of the two lifts; the score for the lift was the heaviest weight successfully lifted.

== Schedule ==
All times are China Standard Time (UTC+08:00)

Date	Time	Event
15 August 2008	15:30	Group A

== Records ==
Prior to this competition, the existing world and Olympic records were as follows.

World Record	Snatch	Natalya Zabolotnaya (RUS)	131 kg	Chiang Mai, Thailand	25 September 2007
World Record	Clean & Jerk	Liu Chunhong (CHN)	159 kg	Doha, Qatar	13 November 2005
World Record	Total	Svetlana Podobedova (RUS)	286 kg	Hangzhou, China	2 June 2006
Olympic Record	Snatch	Natalya Zabolotnaya (RUS)	125 kg	Athens, Greece	20 August 2004
Olympic Record	Clean & Jerk	Pawina Thongsuk (THA)	150 kg	Athens, Greece	20 August 2004
Olympic Record	Total	Natalya Zabolotnaya (RUS)	272 kg	Athens, Greece	20 August 2004

== Results ==
Rank	Athlete	Group	Body weight	Snatch (kg)				Clean & Jerk (kg)				Total
Rank	Athlete	Group	Body weight	1	2	3	Result	1	2	3	Result	Total
1st place, gold medalist(s)	Alla Vazhenina (KAZ)	A	73.88	~~115~~	115	119	119	141	145	147	147	266
2nd place, silver medalist(s)	Lydia Valentín (ESP)	A	74.42	~~110~~	110	115	115	130	135	~~138~~	135	250
3rd place, bronze medalist(s)	Damaris Aguirre (MEX)	A	74.82	103	106	109	109	130	135	136	136	245
4	Ubaldina Valoyes (COL)	A	73.30	105	~~110~~	110	110	130	134	~~138~~	134	244
5	Jeane Lassen (CAN)	A	74.42	~~105~~	105	~~110~~	105	130	135	~~140~~	135	240
6	Nadiya Myronyuk (UKR)	A	74.11	102	~~105~~	105	105	125	127	132	132	237
7	Yuliya Novakovich (BLR)	A	74.19	105	~~110~~	110	110	115	122	127	127	237
8	Elizabeth Poblete (CHI)	A	74.43	86	91	~~93~~	91	106	~~111~~	~~111~~	106	197
DQ	Cao Lei (CHN)	A	73.16	120	125	128	128	147	154	~~159~~	154	~~282~~
DQ	Nadezhda Evstyukhina (RUS)	A	73.33	112	~~117~~	117	117	138	143	147	147	~~264~~
DQ	Iryna Kulesha (BLR)	A	74.78	112	116	118	118	128	133	137	137	~~255~~
DQ	Hripsime Khurshudyan (ARM)	A	74.74	100	105	~~110~~	105	125	~~130~~	130	130	~~235~~

- Cao Lei of China originally won the gold medal, but was disqualified after a re-analysis of her samples from Beijing 2008 tested positive for GHRP-2 and GHRP-2 M2.
- Nadezhda Evstyukhina of Russia originally won the bronze medal, but was disqualified in 2016 after a re-analysis of her samples from Beijing 2008 tested positive for dehydrochlormethyltestosterone (turinabol) and EPO.
- Iryna Kulesha of Belarus originally finished fourth, but was disqualified in 2016 after a re-analysis of her samples from Beijing 2008 tested positive for oral turinabol.
- Hripsime Khurshudyan of Armenia originally finished eleventh, but she was disqualified after a re-analysis of her samples from Beijing 2008 tested positive for stanozolol.

== New records ==
Snatch	128 kg	~~Cao Lei (CHN)~~	~~OR~~
Clean & Jerk	154 kg	~~Cao Lei (CHN)~~	~~OR~~
Total	275 kg	~~Cao Lei (CHN)~~	~~OR~~
Total	282 kg	~~Cao Lei (CHN)~~	~~OR~~
