= 2004 Asian Weightlifting Championships =

International weightlifting competition

The 2004 Asian Weightlifting Championships were held in Almaty in Kazakhstan between April 7 and April 12, 2004. It was the 36th men's and 17th women's championship. The event was organised by the Asian Weightlifting Federation.

== Medal summary ==
=== Men ===
Event	Gold		Silver		Bronze	
56 kg
Snatch	Wu Meijin; China	127.5 kg	Lu Jinbi; China	120.0 kg	Ri Kyong-sok; North Korea	117.5 kg
Clean & Jerk	Wu Meijin; China	165.0 kg	Lu Jinbi; China	160.0 kg	Ri Kyong-sok; North Korea	145.0 kg
Total	Wu Meijin; China	292.5 kg	Lu Jinbi; China	280.0 kg	Ri Kyong-sok; North Korea	262.5 kg
62 kg
Snatch	Shi Zhiyong; China	152.5 kg	Le Maosheng; China	145.0 kg	Ümürbek Bazarbaýew; Turkmenistan	130.0 kg
Clean & Jerk	Le Maosheng; China	175.0 kg	Shi Zhiyong; China	172.5 kg	Ümürbek Bazarbaýew; Turkmenistan	157.5 kg
Total	Shi Zhiyong; China	325.0 kg	Le Maosheng; China	320.0 kg	Ümürbek Bazarbaýew; Turkmenistan	287.5 kg
69 kg
Snatch	Chen Chufu; China	150.0 kg	Manas Alibaev; Kyrgyzstan	140.0 kg	Suriya Dattayawat; Thailand	132.5 kg
Clean & Jerk	Chen Chufu; China	180.0 kg	Suriya Dattayawat; Thailand	170.0 kg	Sitthisak Suphalak; Thailand	165.0 kg
Total	Chen Chufu; China	330.0 kg	Manas Alibaev; Kyrgyzstan	302.5 kg	Suriya Dattayawat; Thailand	302.5 kg
77 kg
Snatch	Sergey Filimonov; Kazakhstan	173.5 kg WR	Li Hongli; China	165.0 kg	Zhan Xugang; China	160.0 kg
Clean & Jerk	Sergey Filimonov; Kazakhstan	197.5 kg	Li Hongli; China	195.0 kg	Vladimir Kuznetsov; Kazakhstan	190.0 kg
Total	Sergey Filimonov; Kazakhstan	370.0 kg	Li Hongli; China	360.0 kg	Zhan Xugang; China	350.0 kg
85 kg
Snatch	Yuan Aijun; China	170.0 kg	Hadi Panzvan; Iran	162.5 kg	Lee Se-won; South Korea	160.0 kg
Clean & Jerk	Yuan Aijun; China	210.0 kg	Hadi Panzvan; Iran	197.5 kg	Akramzhan Khalmatov; Kazakhstan	195.0 kg
Total	Yuan Aijun; China	380.0 kg	Hadi Panzvan; Iran	360.0 kg	Akramzhan Khalmatov; Kazakhstan	352.5 kg
94 kg
Snatch	Bakhyt Akhmetov; Kazakhstan	182.5 kg	Andrey Makarov; Kazakhstan	180.0 kg	Asghar Ebrahimi; Iran	170.0 kg
Clean & Jerk	Bakhyt Akhmetov; Kazakhstan	212.5 kg	Shahin Nassirinia; Iran	210.0 kg	Asghar Ebrahimi; Iran	205.0 kg
Total	Bakhyt Akhmetov; Kazakhstan	395.0 kg	Andrey Makarov; Kazakhstan	377.5 kg	Shahin Nassirinia; Iran	375.0 kg
105 kg
Snatch	Hossein Tavakkoli; Iran	180.0 kg	Dmitriy Frolov; Kazakhstan	177.5 kg	Mohsen Beiranvand; Iran	175.0 kg
Clean & Jerk	Dmitriy Frolov; Kazakhstan	217.5 kg	Hossein Tavakkoli; Iran	210.0 kg	Ahed Joughili; Syria	210.0 kg
Total	Dmitriy Frolov; Kazakhstan	395.0 kg	Hossein Tavakkoli; Iran	390.0 kg	Mohsen Beiranvand; Iran	382.5 kg
+105 kg
Snatch	Jaber Saeed Salem; Qatar	190.0 kg	Igor Khalilov; Uzbekistan	185.0 kg	Mohammad Salehi; Iran	177.5 kg
Clean & Jerk	Jaber Saeed Salem; Qatar	230.0 kg	Igor Khalilov; Uzbekistan	227.5 kg	Mohammad Salehi; Iran	215.0 kg
Total	Jaber Saeed Salem; Qatar	420.0 kg	Igor Khalilov; Uzbekistan	412.5 kg	Mohammad Salehi; Iran	392.5 kg

=== Women ===
Event	Gold		Silver		Bronze	
48 kg
Snatch	Li Zhuo; China	90.0 kg	Nan Aye Khine; Myanmar	85.0 kg	Kunjarani Devi; India	82.5 kg
Clean & Jerk	Li Zhuo; China	115.0 kg	Aree Wiratthaworn; Thailand	110.0 kg	Nan Aye Khine; Myanmar	105.0 kg
Total	Li Zhuo; China	205.0 kg	Nan Aye Khine; Myanmar	190.0 kg	Aree Wiratthaworn; Thailand	187.5 kg
53 kg
Snatch	Deng Jianying; China	95.0 kg	Udomporn Polsak; Thailand	90.0 kg	Swe Swe Win; Myanmar	85.0 kg
Clean & Jerk	Deng Jianying; China	125.0 kg	Udomporn Polsak; Thailand	120.0 kg	Hiromi Miyake; Japan	110.0 kg
Total	Deng Jianying; China	220.0 kg	Udomporn Polsak; Thailand	210.0 kg	Swe Swe Win; Myanmar	195.0 kg
58 kg
Snatch	Sun Caiyan; China	100.0 kg	Junpim Kuntatean; Thailand	97.5 kg	Shwe Sin Win; Myanmar	92.5 kg
Clean & Jerk	Sun Caiyan; China	130.0 kg	Junpim Kuntatean; Thailand	125.0 kg	Pak Hyon-suk; North Korea	122.5 kg
Total	Sun Caiyan; China	230.0 kg	Junpim Kuntatean; Thailand	222.5 kg	Pak Hyon-suk; North Korea	212.5 kg
63 kg
Snatch	Liu Xia; China	102.5 kg	Khin Moe Nwe; Myanmar	100.0 kg	Monika Devi; India	95.0 kg
Clean & Jerk	Liu Xia; China	137.5 kg	Olga Sablina; Kazakhstan	125.0 kg	Nguyễn Thị Thiết; Vietnam	117.5 kg
Total	Liu Xia; China	240.0 kg	Olga Sablina; Kazakhstan	220.0 kg	Khin Moe Nwe; Myanmar	210.0 kg
69 kg
Snatch	Liu Chunhong; China	117.5 kg	Pawina Thongsuk; Thailand	117.5 kg	Irina Vlassova; Kazakhstan	100.0 kg
Clean & Jerk	Liu Chunhong; China	152.5 kg WR	Pawina Thongsuk; Thailand	145.0 kg	Irina Vlassova; Kazakhstan	125.0 kg
Total	Liu Chunhong; China	270.0 kg	Pawina Thongsuk; Thailand	262.5 kg	Irina Vlassova; Kazakhstan	225.0 kg
75 kg
Snatch	Tatyana Khromova; Kazakhstan	120.0 kg WR	Sun Ruiping; China	117.5 kg	Kazue Imahoko; Japan	97.5 kg
Clean & Jerk	Sun Ruiping; China	147.5 kg	Tatyana Khromova; Kazakhstan	145.0 kg	Nguyễn Thị Phương Loan; Vietnam	127.5 kg
Total	Sun Ruiping; China	265.0 kg	Tatyana Khromova; Kazakhstan	265.0 kg	Nguyễn Thị Phương Loan; Vietnam	222.5 kg
+75 kg
Snatch	Tang Gonghong; China	127.5 kg	Lyudmila Kanunova; Kazakhstan	105.0 kg	Geeta Rani; India	105.0 kg
Clean & Jerk	Tang Gonghong; China	175.0 kg WR	Annipa Moontar; Thailand	135.0 kg	Geeta Rani; India	135.0 kg
Total	Tang Gonghong; China	302.5 kg WR	Geeta Rani; India	240.0 kg	Lyudmila Kanunova; Kazakhstan	237.5 kg

== Medal table ==
Ranking by Big (Total result) medals

Rank	Nation	Gold	Silver	Bronze	Total
1	China	11	3	1	15
2	Kazakhstan	3	3	3	9
3	Qatar	1	0	0	1
4	Thailand	0	3	2	5
5	Iran	0	2	3	5
6	Myanmar	0	1	2	3
7	India	0	1	0	1
7	Kyrgyzstan	0	1	0	1
7	Uzbekistan	0	1	0	1
10	North Korea	0	0	2	2
11	Turkmenistan	0	0	1	1
11	Vietnam	0	0	1	1
Totals (12 entries)		15	15	15	45

Ranking by all medals: Big (Total result) and Small (Snatch and Clean & Jerk)

Rank	Nation	Gold	Silver	Bronze	Total
1	China	32	10	2	44
2	Kazakhstan	9	8	7	24
3	Qatar	3	0	0	3
4	Iran	1	6	8	15
5	Thailand	0	12	4	16
6	Myanmar	0	3	5	8
7	Uzbekistan	0	3	0	3
8	Kyrgyzstan	0	2	0	2
9	India	0	1	4	5
10	North Korea	0	0	5	5
11	Turkmenistan	0	0	3	3
11	Vietnam	0	0	3	3
13	Japan	0	0	2	2
14	South Korea	0	0	1	1
14	Syria	0	0	1	1
Totals (15 entries)		45	45	45	135

== Participating nations ==
150 athletes from 22 nations competed.

- China (15)
- Chinese Taipei (1)
- India (9)
- Iran (8)
- Iraq (8)
- Japan (10)
- Jordan (1)
- Kazakhstan (15)
- Kyrgyzstan (8)
- Malaysia (2)
- Mongolia (11)
- Myanmar (5)
- North Korea (9)
- Qatar (3)
- South Korea (6)
- Syria (2)
- Tajikistan (2)
- Thailand (14)
- Turkmenistan (8)
- Uzbekistan (8)
- Vietnam (3)
- Yemen (2)
