= 2005 World Weightlifting Championships – Women's 75 kg =

The 2005 World Weightlifting Championships were held in Doha, Qatar from 9 November to 17 November. The women's 75 kilograms division was staged on 13 November 2005.

== Schedule ==
Date	Time	Event
13 November 2005	15:00	Group B
13 November 2005	20:00	Group A

== Medalists ==
Event	Gold		Silver		Bronze	
Snatch	Natalya Zabolotnaya (RUS)	130 kg	Liu Chunhong (CHN)	126 kg	Svetlana Podobedova (RUS)	124 kg
Clean & Jerk	Liu Chunhong (CHN)	159 kg	Svetlana Podobedova (RUS)	155 kg	Natalya Zabolotnaya (RUS)	155 kg
Total	Liu Chunhong (CHN)	285 kg	Natalya Zabolotnaya (RUS)	285 kg	Svetlana Podobedova (RUS)	279 kg

== Records ==
Prior to this competition, the existing world records were as follows.

World record	Snatch	Natalya Zabolotnaya (RUS)	125 kg	Athens, Greece	20 August 2004
World record	Clean & Jerk	Sun Ruiping (CHN)	152 kg	Busan, South Korea	7 October 2002
World record	Total	Liu Chunhong (CHN)	273 kg	Busan, South Korea	23 May 2005

== Results ==
Rank	Athlete	Group	Body weight	Snatch (kg)				Clean & Jerk (kg)				Total
Rank	Athlete	Group	Body weight	1	2	3	Rank	1	2	3	Rank	Total
1st place, gold medalist(s)	Liu Chunhong (CHN)	A	71.85	118	123	126	2nd place, silver medalist(s)	150	155	159	1st place, gold medalist(s)	285
2nd place, silver medalist(s)	Natalya Zabolotnaya (RUS)	A	74.83	123	127	130	1st place, gold medalist(s)	148	~~153~~	155	3rd place, bronze medalist(s)	285
3rd place, bronze medalist(s)	Svetlana Podobedova (RUS)	A	74.56	118	121	124	3rd place, bronze medalist(s)	149	155	~~162~~	2nd place, silver medalist(s)	279
4	Nora Köppel (ARG)	A	74.46	~~110~~	111	115	4	140	145	~~153~~	5	260
5	Nahla Ramadan (EGY)	A	74.05	110	~~114~~	114	5	136	141	145	4	259
6	Rumyana Petkova (BUL)	A	74.28	105	~~107~~	107	6	~~120~~	120	124	8	231
7	Damaris Aguirre (MEX)	B	74.23	98	102	104	9	~~118~~	120	126	6	230
8	Kazue Imahoko (JPN)	A	74.79	100	~~105~~	105	8	120	~~125~~	~~127~~	10	225
9	Pujari Sailaja (IND)	A	73.92	90	95	97	11	~~125~~	~~125~~	125	7	222
10	Lydia Valentín (ESP)	A	74.04	100	105	~~107~~	7	~~115~~	115	~~120~~	13	220
11	Madeleine Yamechi (CMR)	A	74.19	93	96	~~100~~	12	122	~~125~~	~~125~~	9	218
12	Cara Heads (USA)	B	74.65	93	96	99	10	116	~~119~~	~~119~~	11	215
13	Deborah Lovely (AUS)	B	74.86	90	94	~~97~~	14	112	116	~~118~~	12	210
14	Sheba Deireragea (NRU)	B	74.80	90	~~94~~	94	13	110	~~115~~	~~115~~	14	204
15	Yuko Kikuta (JPN)	B	74.81	80	84	~~88~~	15	100	103	~~106~~	15	187

== New records ==
Snatch	126 kg	Liu Chunhong (CHN)	WR
Snatch	127 kg	Natalya Zabolotnaya (RUS)	WR
Snatch	130 kg	Natalya Zabolotnaya (RUS)	WR
Clean & Jerk	155 kg	Svetlana Podobedova (RUS)	WR
Clean & Jerk	159 kg	Liu Chunhong (CHN)	WR
Total	278 kg	Natalya Zabolotnaya (RUS)	WR
Total	279 kg	Svetlana Podobedova (RUS)	WR
Total	281 kg	Liu Chunhong (CHN)	WR
Total	285 kg	Natalya Zabolotnaya (RUS)	WR
