= Novakovich =

Novakovich is a surname. It may be the transliteration of the South Slavic surname Novaković or of the Russian or Bulgarian spelled surname Новакович.

Notable people with this surname include:

- Andrija Novakovich, American professional soccer player
- Josip Novakovich, Croatian Canadian writer
- Yuliya Novakovich, Belarusian weightlifter
