= Laishram Devi =

Laishram Devi may refer to:

- Bombayla Devi Laishram, Indian archer
- Laishram Monika Devi, Indian weightlifter
- Laishram Sarita Devi, Indian boxer
