= Weightlifting at the 2012 Summer Olympics – Women's 75 kg =

Women's 75 kg at the Games of the XXX Olympiad
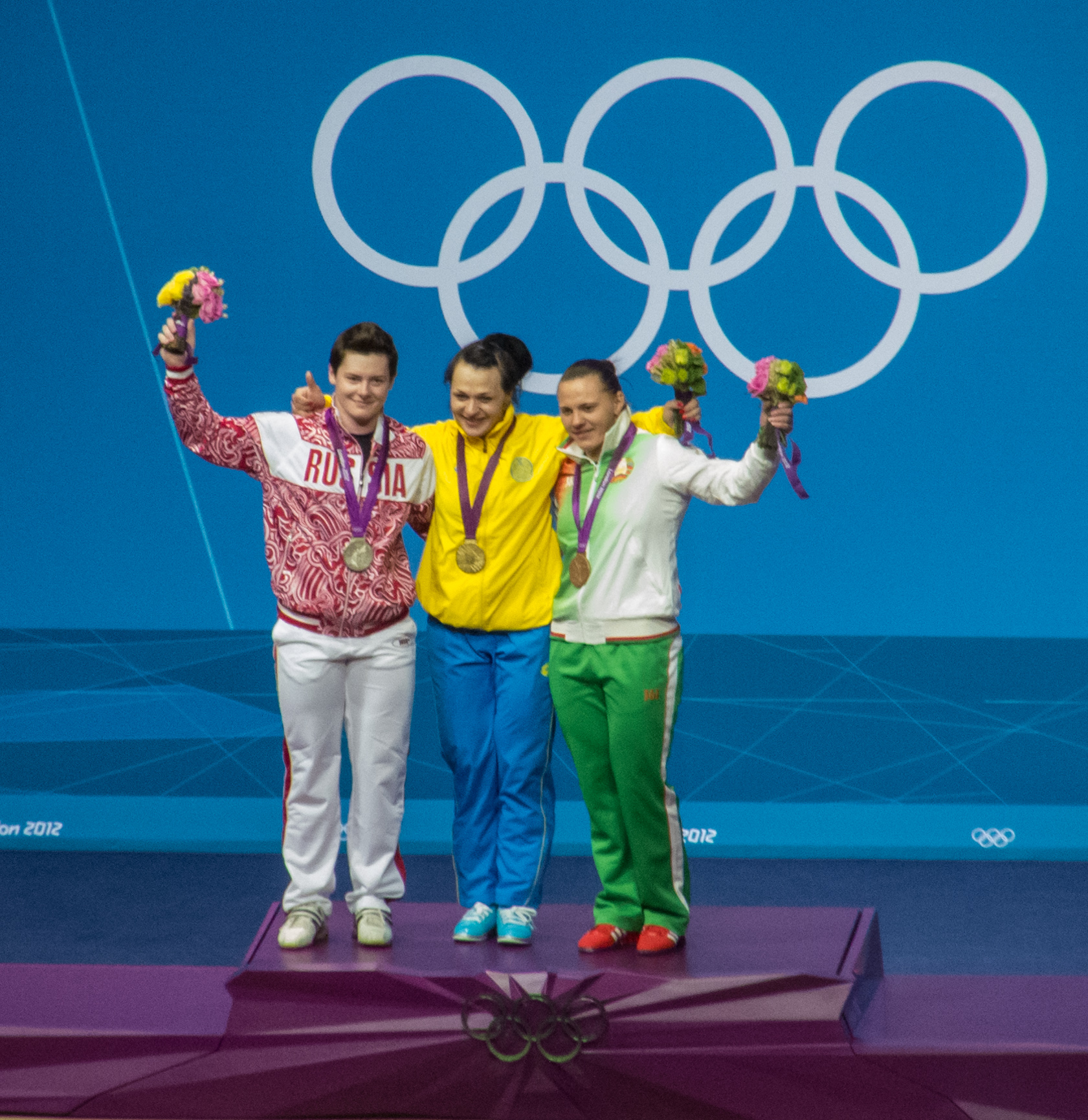
- Victory ceremony — all three medalists were consequently stripped of their medals for doping.
- Venue: ExCeL London
- Date: 3 August 2012
- Competitors: 13 from 12 nations

Medalists
1st place, gold medalist(s)		Lydia Valentín	Spain
2nd place, silver medalist(s)		Abeer Abdelrahman	Egypt
3rd place, bronze medalist(s)		Madias Nzesso	Cameroon

The women's 75 kilograms weightlifting event at the 2012 Summer Olympics in London, United Kingdom, took place at ExCeL London on 3 August 2012.

== Summary ==
Total score was the sum of the lifter's best result in each of the snatch and the clean and jerk, with three lifts allowed for each lift. In case of a tie, the lighter lifter won; if still tied, the lifter who took the fewest attempts to achieve the total score won. Lifters without a valid snatch score did not perform the clean and jerk.

The results of this event were significantly altered following the 2016 retesting of the original in-competition samples for banned substances.

In June 2016, following the Russian doping scandal, it was announced by the IWF that retests of samples taken from the 2012 Olympics indicated that gold medalist Svetlana Podobedova had tested positive for the prohibited substance Stanazolol. A few weeks later, the IWF reported the second wave of re-testing indicated both silver medalist Natalya Zabolotnaya and bronze medalist Iryna Kulesha had tested positive for prohibited anabolic agents.

On 26 October 2016, Podobedova was disqualified, and both Zabolotnaya and Kulesha were disqualified on 21 November 2016.

Thus, Lydia Valentín of Spain, who had originally finished fourth, was declared the 2012 Olympic champion.

== Schedule ==
All times are British Summer Time (UTC+01:00)

Date	Time	Event
3 August 2012	12:30	Group B
3 August 2012	15:30	Group A

== Records ==
Prior to this competition, the existing world and Olympic records were as follows.

World Record	Snatch	Natalya Zabolotnaya (RUS)	135 kg	Belgorod, Russia	17 December 2011
World Record	Clean & Jerk	Nadezhda Evstyukhina (RUS)	163 kg	Paris, France	10 November 2011
World Record	Total	Natalya Zabolotnaya (RUS)	296 kg	Belgorod, Russia	17 December 2011
Olympic Record	Snatch	~~Cao Lei (CHN)~~; Natalya Zabolotnaya (RUS)	~~128 kg~~ 125 kg	~~Beijing, China~~; Athens, Greece	~~15 August 2008~~; 20 August 2004
Olympic Record	Clean & Jerk	~~Cao Lei (CHN)~~; Pawina Thongsuk (THA)	~~154 kg~~ 150 kg	~~Beijing, China~~; Athens, Greece	~~15 August 2008~~; 20 August 2004
Olympic Record	Total	~~Cao Lei (CHN)~~; Natalya Zabolotnaya (RUS)	~~282 kg~~ 272 kg	~~Beijing, China~~; Athens, Greece	~~15 August 2008~~; 20 August 2004

- Cao Lei's Olympic records were rescinded in 2017 because of a doping violation.

== Results ==
Rank	Athlete	Group	Body weight	Snatch (kg)				Clean & Jerk (kg)				Total
Rank	Athlete	Group	Body weight	1	2	3	Result	1	2	3	Result	Total
1st place, gold medalist(s)	Lydia Valentín (ESP)	A	74.39	~~115~~	115	120	120	140	145	~~148~~	145	265
2nd place, silver medalist(s)	Abeer Abdelrahman (EGY)	A	74.60	112	116	118	118	140	~~148~~	~~151~~	140	258
3rd place, bronze medalist(s)	Madias Nzesso (CMR)	B	74.55	105	110	115	115	131	~~136~~	~~140~~	131	246
4	Ewa Mizdal (POL)	A	70.58	100	102	104	104	127	~~132~~	~~133~~	127	231
5	Jaqueline Ferreira (BRA)	B	74.12	95	100	102	102	121	126	128	128	230
6	María Fernanda Valdés (CHI)	B	74.70	96	~~100~~	~~100~~	96	120	127	~~131~~	127	223
7	Lim Ji-hye (KOR)	B	74.81	97	~~102~~	~~103~~	97	~~125~~	126	~~132~~	126	223
8	Thuraia Sobh (SYR)	B	73.36	80	86	~~91~~	86	105	~~113~~	115	115	201
9	Khadija Mohammed (UAE)	B	74.72	47	51	~~53~~	51	53	58	62	62	113
—	Nadezhda Evstyukhina (RUS)	A	74.23	~~125~~	~~125~~	~~125~~	—	—	—	—	—	—
DQ	Svetlana Podobedova (KAZ)	A	74.58	~~126~~	126	130	130	150	156	161	161	~~291~~
DQ	Natalya Zabolotnaya (RUS)	A	74.80	125	128	131	131	147	155	160	160	~~291~~
DQ	Iryna Kulesha (BLR)	A	74.95	116	121	~~125~~	121	140	145	148	148	~~269~~

== New records ==
Snatch	130 kg	~~Svetlana Podobedova (KAZ)~~	~~OR~~
Snatch	131 kg	~~Natalya Zabolotnaya (RUS)~~	~~OR~~
Clean & Jerk	155 kg	~~Natalya Zabolotnaya (RUS)~~	~~OR~~
Clean & Jerk	156 kg	~~Svetlana Podobedova (KAZ)~~	~~OR~~
Clean & Jerk	160 kg	~~Natalya Zabolotnaya (RUS)~~	~~OR~~
Clean & Jerk	161 kg	~~Svetlana Podobedova (KAZ)~~	~~OR~~
Total	286 kg	~~Natalya Zabolotnaya (RUS)~~	~~OR~~
Total	291 kg	~~Natalya Zabolotnaya (RUS)~~	~~OR~~
