= Sportswoman of the Year =

Sportswoman of the Year may refer to:

- Laureus World Sports Award for Sportswoman of the Year
- South African Sportsperson of the Year, including Sportswoman of the Year
- Sports Illustrated Sportsperson of the Year, when awarded to a woman before 2015
- Sunday Times Sportswomen of the Year Awards

== See also ==
- Athlete of the Year
