= Elizabeth Poblete =

Chilean weightlifter

Personal information
- Full name: Elizabeth Francesca Poblete Fernández
- Nationality: Chile
- Born: 28 September 1987 (age 38) Santiago, Chile
- Height: 1.60 m (5 ft 3 in)
- Weight: 75 kg (165 lb)

Sport
- Sport: Weightlifting
- Event: 75 kg

Elizabeth Francesca Poblete Fernández (Note: In this Spanish name, the first or paternal surname is Poblete and the second or maternal family name is Fernández.) (born 28 September 1987 in Santiago) is a Chilean weightlifter. Poblete represented Chile at the 2008 Summer Olympics in Beijing, where she competed for the women's heavyweight category (75 kg). Poblete placed twelfth in this event, as she successfully lifted 91 kg in the single-motion snatch, and hoisted 106 kg in the two-part, shoulder-to-overhead clean and jerk, for a total of 197 kg.

On 8 December 2009, Poblete was featured in the world headlines, when she unexpectedly gave birth to a boy during a training session in Brazil, not even realizing that she was pregnant. Her boy was three months premature, and was taken to a local hospital in São Paulo with his mother, where he remained in the intensive care unit. Unfortunately, the boy named Eric Jose died within a week.
