= Babalwa Ndleleni =

South African weightlifter

Personal information
- Full name: Babalwa Ndleleni
- Born: 14 March 1979 (age 47)
- Weight: 74.39 kg (164.0 lb)

Sport
- Country: South Africa
- Sport: Weightlifting
- Weight class: 75 kg
- Team: National team
- Updated on 8 September 2016

Babalwa Ndleleni (born 14 March 1979) is a South African female weightlifter, competing in the 75 kg category and representing South Africa at international competitions. She competed at world championships, most recently at the 2007 World Weightlifting Championships.

In 2006 she became South African Sportswoman of the Year.

== Major results ==
| Year | Venue | Weight | Snatch (kg) | | | | | Clean & Jerk (kg) | | | | | Total | Rank |
| Year | Venue | Weight | 1 | 2 | 3 | Result | Rank | 1 | 2 | 3 | Result | Rank | Total | Rank |
World Championships
| 2007 | Chiang Mai, Thailand | 75 kg | 82 | 87 | ~~90~~ | 87 | 24 | 107 | ~~112~~ | ~~112~~ | 107 | 25 | 194 | 24 |
African Championships
| 2010 | Yaoundé, Cameroon | 75 kg | ~~83~~ | ~~83~~ | ~~83~~ | — | — | 107 | 113 | ~~118~~ | 113 | 3rd place, bronze medalist(s) | — | — |
| 2009 | Kampala, Uganda | 75 kg | —N/a | —N/a | —N/a | 80 | 3rd place, bronze medalist(s) | —N/a | —N/a | —N/a | 115 | 2nd place, silver medalist(s) | 195 | 2nd place, silver medalist(s) |
| 2008 | Strand, South Africa | 75 kg | 83 | ~~90~~ | ~~91~~ | 83 | 3rd place, bronze medalist(s) | 110 | 115 | 120 | 120 | 2nd place, silver medalist(s) | 203 | 3rd place, bronze medalist(s) |
Commonwealth Championships
| 2009 | Penang, Malaysia | 75 kg | —N/a | —N/a | —N/a | 83 | 2nd place, silver medalist(s) | —N/a | —N/a | —N/a | 112 | 1st place, gold medalist(s) | 195 | 1st place, gold medalist(s) |
Commonwealth Games
| 2010 | Delhi, India | 75 kg | ~~83~~ | 83 | ~~88~~ | 83 | 11 | 108 | 113 | ~~117~~ | 113 | 7 | 196 | 10 |
| 2006 | Melbourne, Australia | 75 kg | 75 | ~~78~~ | 78 | 78 | 3 | 95 | 100 | 104 | 104 | 3 | 182 | (bronze) |
African Games
| 2007 | Algiers, Algeria | 75 kg | 82 | 87 | ~~89~~ | 87 | 4 | 105 | ~~110~~ | 110 | 110 | 4 | 197 | 4 |

== Personal life ==
After her retirement, she worked in a call center, later has an admin job.

Sporting positions
| Preceded by (South Africa) Natalie du Toit | South African Sportswoman of the Year; 2006 | Succeeded by (South Africa) Portia Modise |
