= Elena Shadrina =

Russian weightlifter

Personal information
- Born: 26 March 1982 (age 44)
- Weight: 62.29 kg (137.3 lb)

Sport
- Country: Kazakhstan
- Sport: Weightlifting
- Weight class: 63 kg
- Team: National team
Medal record
Women's weightlifting
Representing Russia
World Championships
Bronze medal – third place	2013 Wrocław	−58 kg
European Championships
Gold medal – first place	2014 Tel-Aviv	-58 kg
Bronze medal – third place	2012 Antalya	-58 kg
- Updated on 8 November 2016

Elena Valentinovna Shadrina (born 26 March 1982) is a Russian weightlifter. She competed at the 2013 World Championships in the Women's 58 kg, winning a bronze medal. She won the bronze medal at the 2008 Asian Weightlifting Championships.

== Major results ==
Year	Venue	Weight	Snatch (kg)				Clean & Jerk (kg)				Total	Rank
Year	Venue	Weight	1	2	3	Rank	1	2	3	Rank	Total	Rank
Asian Weightlifting Championships
2008	Kanazawa, Japan	63 kg	95	99	~~102~~	3rd place, bronze medalist(s)	116	120	123	3rd place, bronze medalist(s)	222	3rd place, bronze medalist(s)
