= Mohammad Salehi (weightlifter) =

Iranian weightlifter

Personal information
- Native name: محمد صالحی
- Nationality: Iranian
- Born: 6 May 1983 (age 43)
- Weight: 135.15 kg (298.0 lb)

Sport
- Country: Iran
- Sport: Weightlifting
- Event: +105 kg

Achievements and titles
- Personal bests: Snatch: 185 kg (2008); Clean and jerk: 235 kg (2008); Total: 420 kg (2008)
Medal record
Men's weightlifting
Representing Iran
Asian Championships
| Silver medal – second place | 2008 Kanazawa | +105 kg |
| Bronze medal – third place | 2004 Almaty | +105 kg |

Mohammad Salehi (Persian: محمد صالحی, born 6 May 1983) is an Iranian weightlifter who won the silver medal in the Men's +105 kg weight class at the 2008 Asian Weightlifting Championships.
