= Rashid Sharifi =

Iranian weightlifter (born 1984)

Personal information
- Nationality: Iran
- Born: September 21, 1984 (age 42)
- Weight: 140.50 kg (309.7 lb)

Sport
- Country: Iran
- Sport: Weightlifting
- Event: +105 kg

Achievements and titles
- Personal bests: Snatch: 196 kg (2008); Clean and jerk: 236kg (2008); Total: 426 kg (2008)
Medal record
Representing Iran
Men's weightlifting
Asian Championships
Gold medal – first place	2008 Kanazawa	+105 kg
Gold medal – first place	2013 Astana	+105 kg

Rashid Sharifi Sadeh (Persian: رشید شریفی سده, born September 21, 1984, in Sedeh Lenjan, Isfahan) is an Iranian weightlifter in the +105 kg category.

At the 2007 World Championships, he ranked 8th with a total of 410 kg.

He won the gold medal at the 2008 Asian Weightlifting Championships, with a total of 426 kg and 2009 Asian Weightlifting Championships, with a total of 440 kg, but he lost this medal because he tested positive for doping, as did fellow Iranian weightlifting team members Anoush Armak and Omid Naiij Kenar.

After retirement of the Olympic champion Hossein Rezazadeh, he succeeded him representing Iran at the 2008 Summer Olympics in Beijing. Due to his poor test results he was placed at group B of the competitions and finished 6th.

== Major results ==
Year	Venue	Weight	Snatch (kg)				Clean & Jerk (kg)				Total	Rank
Year	Venue	Weight	1	2	3	Rank	1	2	3	Rank	Total	Rank
Olympic Games
2008	Beijing, China	+105 kg	188	192	196	6	230	~~238~~	~~238~~	7	426	6
World Championships
2007	Chiang Mai, Thailand	+105 kg	180	~~188~~	~~188~~	13	220	230	~~235~~	8	410	8
Asian Championships
2008	Kanazawa, Japan	+105 kg	180	~~190~~	190	1st place, gold medalist(s)	220	230	236	1st place, gold medalist(s)	426	1st place, gold medalist(s)
2009	(Kazakhstan) Taldykorgan, kazakhstan	+105 kg	192	~~200~~	200	DSQ	230	240	~~246~~	DSQ	---	DSQ
2013	Astana, Kazakhstan	+105 kg	185	191	~~197~~	1st place, gold medalist(s)	220	226	~~232~~	2nd place, silver medalist(s)	417	1st place, gold medalist(s)
World Junior Championships
2004	Minsk, Belarus	+105 kg	~~172.5~~	~~172.5~~	172.5	3rd place, bronze medalist(s)	~~207.5~~	~~207.5~~	~~207.5~~	--	--	--
