= Alla Vazhenina =

Russian weightlifter

Alla Ivanovna Vazhenina
Personal information
- Native name: Алла Ивановна Важенина
- Nationality: Russia Kazakhstan
- Born: May 29, 1983 (age 42) Shadrinsk, Kurgan Oblast, RSFSR, USSR

Alla Vazhenina
Medal record

Women's Weightlifting

Representing Kazakhstan

Olympic Games
Gold medal – first place	2008 Beijing	75 kg

Asian Weightlifting Championships
Silver medal – second place	2008 Kanazawa	75 kg

Alla Ivanovna Vazhenina (born May 29, 1983) is a Russian weightlifter competing for Kazakhstan.

She was born in Shadrinsk, Kurgan Oblast. When she was not selected for the Russian national team, she decided to compete for Kazakhstan.

She won the silver medal in the 75 kg category at the 2008 Asian Weightlifting Championships, with a total of 266 kg.

At the 2008 Summer Olympics she won the silver medal in the 75 kg category, again with a total of 266 kg.

Recipient of the Order of Parasat.
