= Thuraia Sobh =

Syrian weightlifter

Thuraia Sobh (Arabic: ثريا صبح; born 4 January 1986 in Mhardeh, Syria) is a Syrian weightlifter. She competed at the 2012 Summer Olympics in the -75 kg event.
