= Ramzi Al-Mahrous =

Saudi Arabian weightlifter (born 1982)

Personal information
- Nationality: Saudi Arabia
- Born: 5 February 1982 (age 44)
- Height: 1.70 m (5 ft 7 in)
- Weight: 85 kg (187 lb)

Sport
- Sport: Weightlifting

Ramzi Al-Mahrous (Arabic: رمزي المحروس; born 5 February 1982) is a Saudi Arabian weightlifter. He competed in the 2004 Summer Olympics.
