= Yuliya Novakovich =

Belarusian weightlifter

Personal information
- Full name: Yuliya Siarheyeuna Novakovich
- Nationality: Belarus
- Born: 6 May 1989 (age 37) Pinsk, Byelorussian SSR, Soviet Union
- Height: 1.65 m (5 ft 5 in)
- Weight: 74 kg (163 lb)

Sport
- Sport: Weightlifting
- Event: 75 kg
- Club: Dynamo Mahilyow

Yuliya Siarheyeuna Novakovich (Belarusian: Юлія Сяргееўна Наваковіч; born May 6, 1989, in Pinsk) is a Belarusian weightlifter. Novakovich represented Belarus at the 2008 Summer Olympics in Beijing, where she competed for the women's heavyweight category, along with her compatriot Iryna Kulesha, who eventually won the silver medal. She placed tenth in this event, as she successfully lifted 110 kg in the snatch, and hoisted 127 kg in the clean and jerk, for a total of 237 kg.
