= Asian Weightlifting Federation =

Sport governing body in Asia

- Abbreviation: AWF
- Formation: 1958
- Type: Federation of national associations
- Headquarters: Doha, Qatar
- Region served: Asia
- President: Mohamed Yousef Al Mana
- General Secretary: Mohamed Hassan Jaloud
- Parent organization: International Weightlifting Federation
- Website: https://awf.sport

The Asian Weightlifting Federation (AWF) is the official governing body for the sport of weightlifting in Asia. The federation was established in 1958, Japan. It is responsible for organizing competitions such as the Asian Weightlifting Championships and setting down rules and guidelines. Given the size of Asia, the federation has specific organisations operating in its countries such as the Japan Weightlifting Association, etc.

== History ==
https://oca.asia/sports/federations/29-asian-weightlifting-federation.html

https://awf.sport/history-of-us/

== Events ==
- Main article : Asian Weightlifting Championships (open age)
- Main article : Asian Junior Weightlifting Championships (15 - 20 age)
- Main article : Asian Youth Weightlifting Championships (13 - 17 age)
- Main article : Asian Masters Weightlifting Championships (+35 age)
- Main article : Asian Club Weightlifting Championships (clubs : junior and senior)

== Members & Executive Board ==
Under the Olympic Council of Asia, it has 45 member weightlifting associations under their respective National Olympic Committees, split by regional zones;

Nation	Code	National Olympic Committee
West Asia Zone (Zone 1)
Bahrain	BRN	Bahrain Olympic Committee
Iran	IRI	National Olympic Committee of the Islamic Republic of Iran
Iraq	IRQ	National Olympic Committee of Iraq
Jordan	JOR	Jordan Olympic Committee
Kuwait	KUW	Kuwait Olympic Committee
Lebanon	LBN	Lebanese Olympic Committee
Oman	OMA	Oman Olympic Committee
Palestine	PLE	Palestine Olympic Committee
Qatar	QAT	Qatar Olympic Committee
Saudi Arabia	KSA	Saudi Arabian Olympic Committee
Syria	SYR	Syrian Olympic Committee
United Arab Emirates	UAE	United Arab Emirates National Olympic Committee
Yemen	YEM	Yemen Olympic Committee
Central Asia Zone (Zone 2)
Afghanistan	AFG	Afghanistan National Olympic Committee
Kazakhstan	KAZ	National Olympic Committee of the Republic of Kazakhstan
Kyrgyzstan	KGZ	National Olympic Committee of the Kyrgyz Republic
Tajikistan	TJK	National Olympic Committee of the Republic of Tajikistan
Turkmenistan	TKM	National Olympic Committee of Turkmenistan
Uzbekistan	UZB	National Olympic Committee of the Republic of Uzbekistan
South Asia Zone (Zone 3)
Bangladesh	BAN	Bangladesh Olympic Association
Bhutan	BHU	Bhutan Olympic Committee
India	IND	Indian Olympic Association
Maldives	MDV	Maldives Olympic Committee
Nepal	NEP	Nepal Olympic Committee
Pakistan	PAK	Pakistan Olympic Association
Sri Lanka	SRI	National Olympic Committee of Sri Lanka
East Asia Zone (Zone 4)
China	CHN	Chinese Olympic Committee
Chinese Taipei	TPE	Chinese Taipei Olympic Committee
Hong Kong	HKG	Sports Federation and Olympic Committee of Hong Kong, China
Japan	JPN	Japanese Olympic Committee
North Korea	PRK	Olympic Committee of the Democratic People's Republic of Korea
South Korea	KOR	Korean Sport & Olympic Committee
Macau	MAC	Macau Sports and Olympic Committee
Mongolia	MGL	Mongolian National Olympic Committee
Southeast Asia Zone (Zone 5)
Brunei	BRU	Brunei Darussalam National Olympic Council
Cambodia	CAM	National Olympic Committee of Cambodia
Indonesia	INA	Indonesian Olympic Committee
Laos	LAO	National Olympic Committee of Lao
Malaysia	MAS	Olympic Council of Malaysia
Myanmar	MYA	Myanmar Olympic Committee
Philippines	PHI	Philippine Olympic Committee (Note: From 1911 to 1975, Philippines was represented by the Philippine Amateur Athletic Federation (PAAF). In 1975, the Philippine Olympic Committee was established and replaced the PAAF.)
Singapore	SGP	Singapore National Olympic Council
Thailand	THA	National Olympic Committee of Thailand
Timor-Leste	TLS	National Olympic Committee of Timor-Leste
Vietnam	VIE	Vietnam Olympic Committee

Executive Board:

President :

Mohamed Yousef Al Mana (Qatar)

General Secretary: Mohamed Ahmed Al Harbi (KSA)

1st Vice President: Mohamed Hassan Jaloud (Iraq)

Vice Presidents:

Shakrillo Mahmudov (Uzbekistan) Sung Young Choi (South Korea) Meng Bo (China) Abdulla Al Jarmal (Yemen) Monico Puentavella (Philippines)

Executive Board Members:

Ahmed Mohyuddin (Bangladesh) Ebrahem Alemyan (Jordan) Sajjad Anoushiravini (Iran) Sen Gupta (Nepal) Eshaq Ebrahim Eshaq (Bahrain) Junichi Okada (Japan) Meco Chang (Taiwan) Hassanin Alchikh (Syria) Omurzhan Moldodosov (Kyrgyzstan) Khodr Moukalled (Lebanon) Hafiz Imran Butt (Pakistan)
