= Abeer Abdelrahman =

Egyptian weightlifter (born 1992)

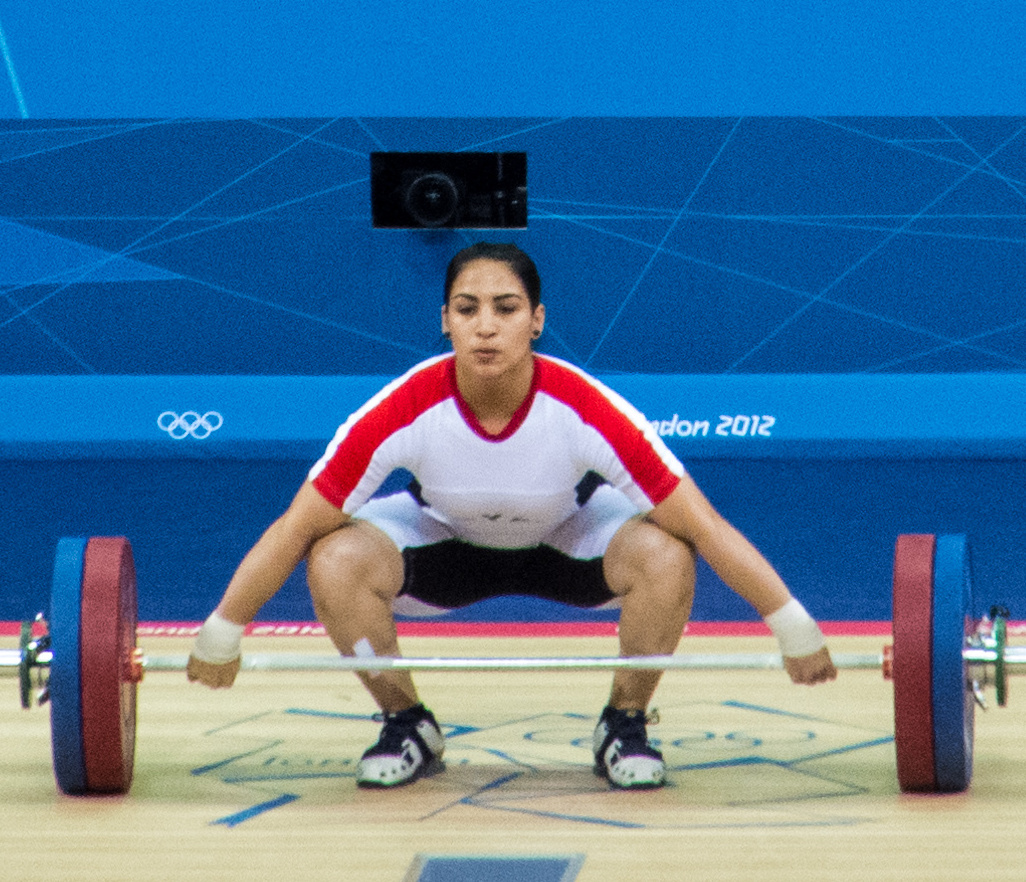
- Abdelrahman in 2012

Personal information
- Full name: Abeer Abdelrahman Khalil Mahmoud
- Nationality: Egyptian
- Born: 13 June 1992 (age 34) Alexandria, Egypt
- Spouse: Captain Mohamed Sultan (m. 2011)
- Children: 2
Medal record
Women's weightlifting
Representing Egypt
Olympic Games
Silver medal – second place	2012 London	–75 kg
Bronze medal – third place	2008 Beijing	–69 kg
World Championships
Bronze medal – third place	2009 Goyang	–75 kg

Abeer Abdelrahman Khalil Mahmoud (Egyptian Arabic: عَبِير عَبْد الرَّحْمٰن خَلِيل مَحْمُود; born 13 June 1992) is an Egyptian weightlifter. She was born in Alexandria, Egypt.

== Personal life ==
Abeer Abdelrahman met Captain Mohamed Sultan, a fellow weightlifting coach, whom she married in 2011. She is the mother of Saif and Nour.

== Career ==
She competed at the 2008 and 2012 Summer Olympics in the -69 kg and -75 kg weight categories, respectively, and finished in fifth place at both Games. In 2016, Abdelrahman retroactively became the first Egyptian woman to win an Olympic medal when the original gold, silver, and bronze medal winners from the 2012 Olympics were disqualified due to doping. Abdelrahman is now the silver medal winner for the 75 kg event in the 2012 Summer Olympics, coming second to Spain's Lidia Velentin. The first Egyptian woman to receive her Olympic medal on the podium was Sara Ahmed for her bronze medal performance in the women's 69 kg category at the 2016 Summer Olympics.

Abeer stated during an interview.

"I am happy with my Beijing performance even more than London's because I was too young at the time, just 16 years old".

— ahramonline, Egypt's weightlifter Abeer AbdelRahman 'thrilled' as second Olympic medal nears

== Achievements ==
Abeer Abdelrahman is the first Egyptian woman to win an Olympic medal and has two medals to her name. Also, she won a bronze medal at the 2009 World Championship in Goyang.

Year	Competition	Venue	Position	Event	Medal
2008	Olimpics	Beijing	3rd	weightlifting	Bronze
2008	World Championship	Goyang	3rd	weightlifting	Bronze
2012	Olympics	London	2nd	weightlifting	Silver

== Retirement ==
In 2013, Abeer Abdelrahman announced her retirement from competitive weightlifting due to a combination of injury and family commitments. During the 2013 Mediterranean Games, she won a silver medal despite competing while injured, but the tournament took a toll on her physically, as she sustained serious knee injuries, including a torn cruciate ligament and cartilage damage. Although she briefly returned to training alongside her husband in an attempt to prepare for upcoming World and Mediterranean Championships, her plans were put on hold when she became pregnant with their first daughter, contributing to her permanent retirement.
