= South African Sportsperson of the Year =

Annaul award in South Africa

- Awarded for: Excellence in sporting achievement
- Country: South Africa
- Presented by: Department of Sport, Arts and Culture

South African Sportsperson of the Year is the main award of the South Africa Sports Awards ceremony, were established by the Department of Sport, Arts and Culture.

== List of Winners ==
Year	Sportsman of the Year		Sportswoman of the Year		Sport Star of the Year		Ref
Year	Winner	Sport	Winner	Sport	Winner	Sport	
2004	Roland Schoeman	Swimming	Hestrie Cloete	Athletics	—N/a		
2005	Bryan Habana and Jacques Kallis	Rugby union Cricket	Natalie du Toit	Swimming	—N/a		
2006	Mbulaeni Mulaudzi	Athletics	Babalwa Ndleleni	Weightlifting	—N/a		
2007	Bryan Habana	Rugby union	Portia Modise	Football	—N/a		
2008	Godfrey Khotso Mokoena	Athletics	Natalie du Toit	Swimming	—N/a		
2011	Cameron van der Burgh	Swimming	Noko Matlou	Football	Hashim Amla	Cricketer	
2012	Vernon Philander	Cricket	Caster Semenya	Athletics	Chad Le Clos	Swimming	
2013	Cameron van der Burgh	Swimming	Mapaseka Makhanya	Athletics	Itumeleng Khune	Football	
2014	Chad le Clos	Swimming	Ashleigh Moolman-Pasio	Cycling	Portia Modise	Football	
2015	Wayde van Niekerk	Athletics	Ashleigh Moolman-Pasio	Cycling	Wayde van Niekerk	Athletics	
2016	Wayde van Niekerk	Athletics	Caster Semenya	Athletics	Wayde van Niekerk	Athletics	
2017	Luvo Manyonga	Athletics	Caster Semenya	Athletics			
2018	Chad le Clos	Swimming	Caster Semenya	Athletics	Caster Semenya	Athletics	
2019	Moruti Mthalane	Boxing	Tatjana Schoenmaker	Swimming	Tatjana Schoenmaker	Swimming	
2020	Cancelled due to the COVID-19 pandemic.						
2021	Makazole Mapimpi	Rugby union	Tatjana Schoenmaker	Swimming	Tatjana Schoenmaker	Swimming	
2022	Pieter Coetze	Swimming	Lara van Niekerk	Swimming	Andile Dlamini	Football	
2024	Eben Etzebeth	Rugby union	Kirsten Neuschäfer	Sailor	Siya Kolisi	Rugby union	
2025	Alan Hatherly	Cycling	Tatjana Smith	Swimming	Tatjana Smith	Swimming	
2026	Pieter Coetze	Swimming	Prudence Sekgodiso	Athletics	Akani Simbine	Athletics	

=== Multiple winners ===
- 4 times:

2012, 2016, 2017, 2018 – Caster Semenya

- 3 times:

2019, 2021, 2025 – Tatjana Smith (née Schoenmaker)

- 2 times:

2005, 2008 – Natalie du Toit
2011, 2013 – Cameron van der Burgh
2014, 2018 – Chad le Clos
2014, 2015 – Ashleigh Moolman-Pasio
2015, 2016 – Wayde van Niekerk
2022, 2026 – Pieter Coetze

=== By sport ===
This table lists the total number of awards won by the winner's sport.

Accurate up to and including the 2025 award.

Winners by sport
Sport	Men	Woman	Sport Star	Total placing(s)
Swimming	7	8	3	18
Athletics	5	7	4	16
Rugby union	4	0	1	5
Football	0	2	3	5
Cycling	1	2	0	3
Cricket	2	0	1	3
Boxing	1	0	0	1
Sailing	0	1	0	1
Weightlifting	0	1	0	1
