= Japan Weightlifting Association =

Sports governing body in Japan

The Japan Weightlifting Association is the official association which takes responsibility for decisions and setting guidelines for the sport of weightlifting in Japan.

As of 2008 it is presided by Hidekazu Tobita.
