= Tatyana Khromova =

Kazakhstani weightlifter

Personal information
- Full name: Tatyana Nikolayevna Khromova
- Born: 26 February 1980 (age 46) Uzbek SSR, Soviet Union
- Height: 173 cm (5 ft 8 in)
- Weight: 74.86 kg (165.0 lb)

Sport
- Country: Uzbekistan; Kazakhstan
- Sport: Weightlifting
- Team: National team
- Updated on 6 September 2016

Tatyana Nikolayevna Khromova (Татьяна Николаевна Хромова; born 26 February 1980) was an Uzbekistani born Kazakhstani female weightlifter, competing in the 75 kg category and representing Kazakhstan at international competitions.

She participated at the 2000 Summer Olympics in the 75 kg event, and at the 2004 Summer Olympics in the 75 kg event.

She competed at world championships, at the 2010 World Weightlifting Championships.

== Major results ==
Year	Venue	Weight	Snatch (kg)				Clean & Jerk (kg)				Total	Rank
Year	Venue	Weight	1	2	3	Rank	1	2	3	Rank	Total	Rank
Summer Olympics
2000	Sydney, Australia	75 kg										DNF
2004	Athens, Greece	75 kg										6
World Championships
2010	Antalya, Turkey	75 kg	107	110	~~113~~	10	~~133~~	~~133~~	133	9	243	8
2009	Goyang, South Korea	75 kg	~~110~~	110	~~115~~	6	~~135~~	~~135~~	135	6	245	5
2007	Chiang Mai, Thailand	75 kg	95	100	106	6	115	120	~~130~~	14	226	10
2003	Vancouver, Canada	75 kg	110	~~115~~	~~115~~	6	~~130~~	130	~~135~~	10	240	8
2001	Antalya, Turkey	75 kg	105	~~110~~	110	4	130	~~132-5~~	~~132.5~~	5	240	5
1999	Piraeus, Greece	75 kg	100	105	~~107.5~~	4	120	125	130	5	235	5
