= Natalya Zabolotnaya =

Russian weightlifter (born 1985)

Natalia Zabolotnaya
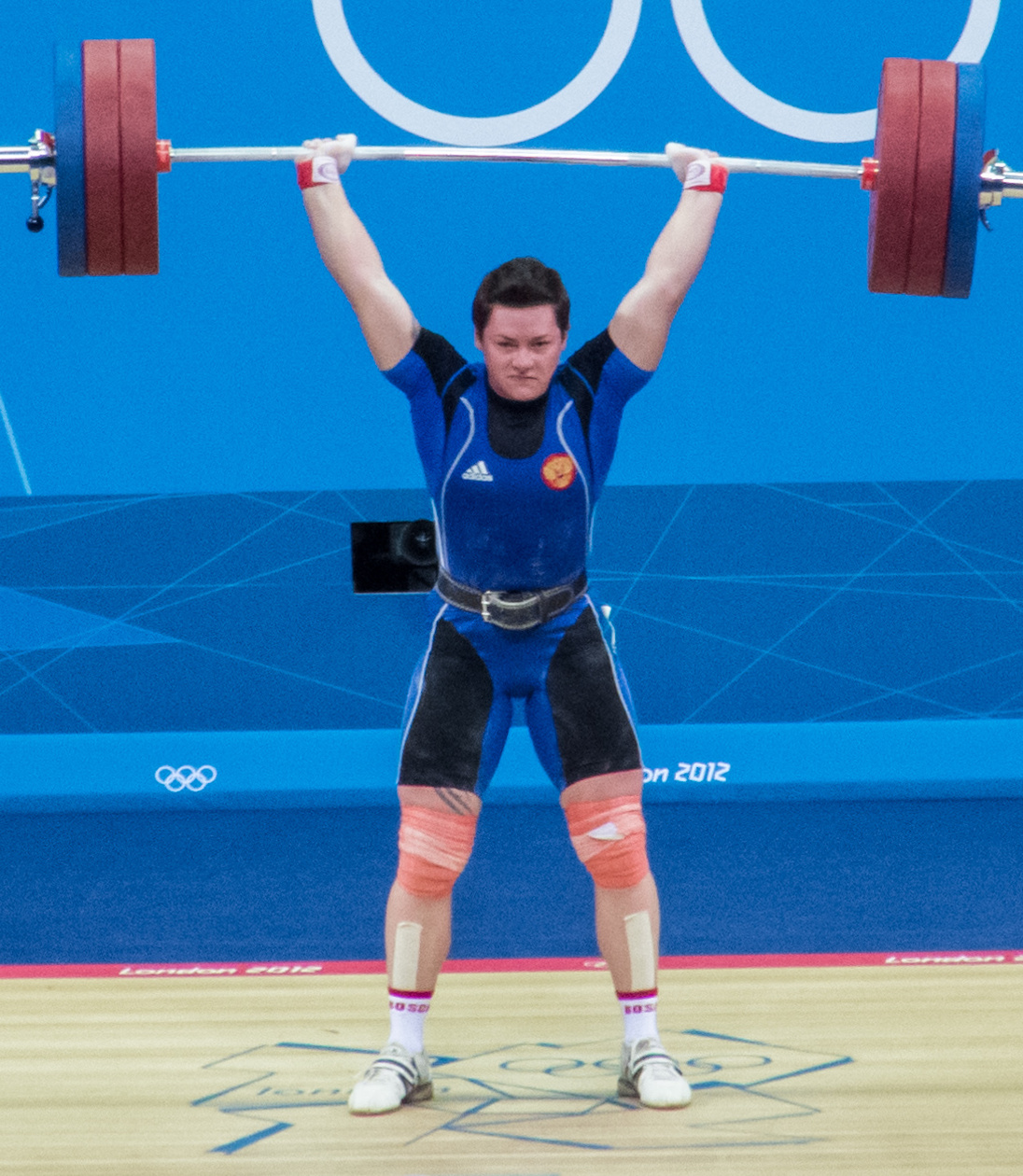
- Zabolotnaya in 2012

Personal information
- Full name: Natalya Aleksandrovna Zabolotnaya
- Nationality: Russian
- Born: 15 August 1985 (age 40) Salsk, Rostov Oblast, Russian SFSR, Soviet Union
- Years active: 2003-
- Height: 1.68 m (5 ft 6 in)
- Weight: 75 kg (165 lb)

Sport
- Country: Russia
- Sport: Olympic weightlifting
- Event: 75 kg
- Club: Rostov Army

Achievements and titles
- Personal bests: Snatch: 135 kg (2011, WR); Clean & Jerk: 161 kg (2011); Total: 296 kg (2011, WR)
Medal record
Representing Russia
Olympic Games
Silver medal – second place	2004 Athens	– 75 kg
Disqualified	2012 London	– 75 kg
World Championships
Silver medal – second place	2005 Doha	75 kg
Silver medal – second place	2007 Chiang Mai	75 kg
Silver medal – second place	2010 Antalya	75 kg
European Championships
Gold medal – first place	2003 Loutraki	75 kg
Gold medal – first place	2006 Władysławowo	75 kg
Gold medal – first place	2008 Lignano Sabbiadoro	75 kg
Gold medal – first place	2009 Bucharest	75 kg
Gold medal – first place	2010 Minsk	75 kg
Silver medal – second place	2011 Kazan	75 kg
- Updated on 22 November 2016

Natalya Aleksandrovna Zabolotnaya (Russian: Наталья Александровна Заболотная; born 15 August 1985) is a Russian weightlifter.

== Career ==
Zabolotnaya competed in the women's 75 kg weight class at the 2004 Summer Olympics in Athens and won the silver medal, lifting 272.5 kg in total. The result qualified as a world record, but it was also achieved by Pawina Thongsuk, who won the competition. Zabolotnaya won a gold medal in the 75 kg weight class at the 2010 European Championship.

She originally was awarded the silver medal at the 2012 Summer Olympics in the women's 75 kg category with a total of 291 kg. This result was an Olympic record, which was also achieved by Svetlana Podobedova who was awarded the gold medal in the competition by virtue of lighter bodyweight, though Podobedova was subsequently stripped of her medal due to doping. Zabolotnaya's 131 kg snatch was a (later also nullified due to doping-related cheating) Olympic record.

In November 2016, Zabolotnaya was stripped of her 2012 Olympic medal after her drug sample came back positive in a retest.

== Major results ==
Year	Venue	Weight	Snatch (kg)				Clean & Jerk (kg)				Total	Rank
Year	Venue	Weight	1	2	3	Rank	1	2	3	Rank	Total	Rank
Olympic Games
2004	Athens, Greece	75 kg	120	125	~~127.5~~	1	142.5	147.5	~~152.5~~	2	272.5	2nd place, silver medalist(s)
2012	London, United Kingdom	75 kg	125	128	131	1	147	~~155~~	160	2	~~291~~	DSQ (2nd)
World Championships
2005	Doha, Qatar	75 kg	123	127	130	1st place, gold medalist(s)	148	~~153~~	155	3rd place, bronze medalist(s)	285	2nd place, silver medalist(s)
2007	Chiang Mai, Thailand	75 kg	124	127	131	1st place, gold medalist(s)	150	~~156~~	~~156~~	3rd place, bronze medalist(s)	281	2nd place, silver medalist(s)
2010	Antalya, Turkey	75 kg	128	~~133~~	133	2nd place, silver medalist(s)	153	160	~~163~~	3rd place, bronze medalist(s)	293	2nd place, silver medalist(s)
European Championships
2003	Loutraki, Greece	75 kg	102.5	~~107.5~~	107.5	3rd place, bronze medalist(s)	127.5	132.5	~~135~~	3rd place, bronze medalist(s)	240	1st place, gold medalist(s)
2006	Wladyslawowo, Poland	75 kg	122	127	~~131~~	1st place, gold medalist(s)	145	151	~~160~~	1st place, gold medalist(s)	278	1st place, gold medalist(s)
2008	Lignano Sabbiadoro, Italy	75 kg	118	123	~~127~~	1st place, gold medalist(s)	135	~~140~~	141	2nd place, silver medalist(s)	264	1st place, gold medalist(s)
2009	Bucharest, Romania	75 kg	112	118	120	1st place, gold medalist(s)	140	145	--	1st place, gold medalist(s)	265	1st place, gold medalist(s)
2010	Minsk, Belarus	75 kg	122	127	129	1st place, gold medalist(s)	150	156	--	1st place, gold medalist(s)	285	1st place, gold medalist(s)
2011	Kazan, Russia	75 kg	128	133	--	1st place, gold medalist(s)	153	~~158~~	~~158~~	2nd place, silver medalist(s)	286	2nd place, silver medalist(s)
World Junior Championships
2002	Havířov, Czech Republic	69 kg	95	100	~~102.5~~	5	110	115	~~120~~	5	215	5
IWF GRAND PRIX
2011	Belgorod, Russia	75 kg	125	135	~~136~~	1	~~150~~	150	161	1	296	1st place, gold medalist(s)
