= Cao Lei =

Chinese weightlifter (born 1983)

Personal information
- Born: 24 December 1983 (age 42) Qinhuangdao, Hebei
- Height: 1.68 m (5 ft 6 in)
- Weight: 75 kg (165 lb)

Sport
- Country: China
- Sport: Weightlifting
- Event: Women's 75 kg
Medal record
Olympic Games
Disqualified	2008 Beijing	75 kg
World Championships
Gold medal – first place	2006 Santo Domingo	75 kg
Gold medal – first place	2007 Chiang Mai	75 kg
Silver medal – second place	2009 Goyang	75 kg
Asian Games
Gold medal – first place	2006 Doha	75 kg
Silver medal – second place	2010 Guangzhou	-75 kg
Chinese National Games
Gold medal – first place	2009 Shandong	75 kg
East Asian Games
Gold medal – first place	2005 Macau	69 kg
Gold medal – first place	2009 Hong Kong	75 kg

Cao Lei (Chinese: 曹磊; pinyin: Cáo Lěi; born 24 December 1983 in Qinhuangdao, Hebei) is a Chinese weightlifter. She was born in north China's Hebei Province and was raised in the northeastern Heilongjiang Province.

== Career ==
Cao Lei started weightlifting training at the age of 11 and attended Daging City sports school in 1997 when she was selected to the Heilongjiang province weightlifting team coached by Qixi Fu.

After winning the national championships, Lei made her debut in the international field in 2001 in the Asian Championships 63 kilo category by winning gold with a result of 107.5 kg (a junior world record at the time) in snatch, and 127.5 kg in clean and jerk, totaling 235 kg. The next year she started training with the national team under the supervision of Ma Wenhui. She moved up to the 69 kilo weight class, in which she won the junior world championships 2003 with a 105+140 kg performance.

In 2005 Cao placed fourth in the National Games, and later in the year won gold in the East Asian Games. The next year she moved up one weight class and participated in the women's -75 kg at the 2006 World Weightlifting Championships and won the gold medal, snatching 118 kg and clean and jerking an additional 150 kg for a total of 268 kg. Later the same year, she took gold in the Asian Games, besting her year ranking mark to 120 kg in the snatch and 152 kg in the clean and jerk.

At the 2007 World Weightlifting Championships she won the gold medal again in the same category, with a total of 286 kg.

In 2009 she finished her weightlifting grand slam by taking gold in Chinese National Games with a result of 125 kg in the snatch, 150 kg in the clean and jerk, for 275 kg total. In the 2009 weightlifting world championships she wasn't able to sustain her supremacy over the 75 kilo weight class as Svetlana Podobedova of Kazakhstan swept three gold medals, Cao took silvers in all three disciplines. Later that year she represented her country in East Asian Games taking gold with routine performance of 252 kg total.

== Doping violation ==
During the 2008 Beijing Olympic games, Cao was placed first in the women's -75 kg weightlifting division. She set new Olympic records in the snatch and clean and jerk events, as well as setting a new overall score record. However, on 12 January 2017, it was announced that because of a doping violation she had been retroactively disqualified from the 2008 Olympic Games and was therefore stripped of her gold medal and her records annulled.
