= Nadiya Myronyuk =

Ukrainian weightlifter

Personal information
- Full name: Nadiya Mykolaïvna Myronyuk
- Nationality: Ukraine
- Born: 25 March 1984 (age 42) Volyn Oblast, Ukrainian SSR, Soviet Union
- Height: 1.58 m (5 ft 2 in)
- Weight: 75 kg (165 lb)

Sport
- Sport: Weightlifting
- Event: 75 kg
- Club: Dynamo Lutsk

Nadiya Mykolaïvna Myronyuk (Ukrainian: Надія Миколаївна Миронюк; born March 25, 1984, in Volyn Oblast) is a Ukrainian weightlifter.

== Career ==
Myronyuk represented Ukraine at the 2008 Summer Olympics in Beijing, where she competed for the women's heavyweight category (75 kg). Myronyuk placed ninth in this event, as she successfully lifted 105 kg in the single-motion snatch, and hoisted 132 kg in the two-part, shoulder-to-overhead clean and jerk, for a total of 237 kg.
