= Svetlana Podobedova =

Russian-born Kazakhstani weightlifter

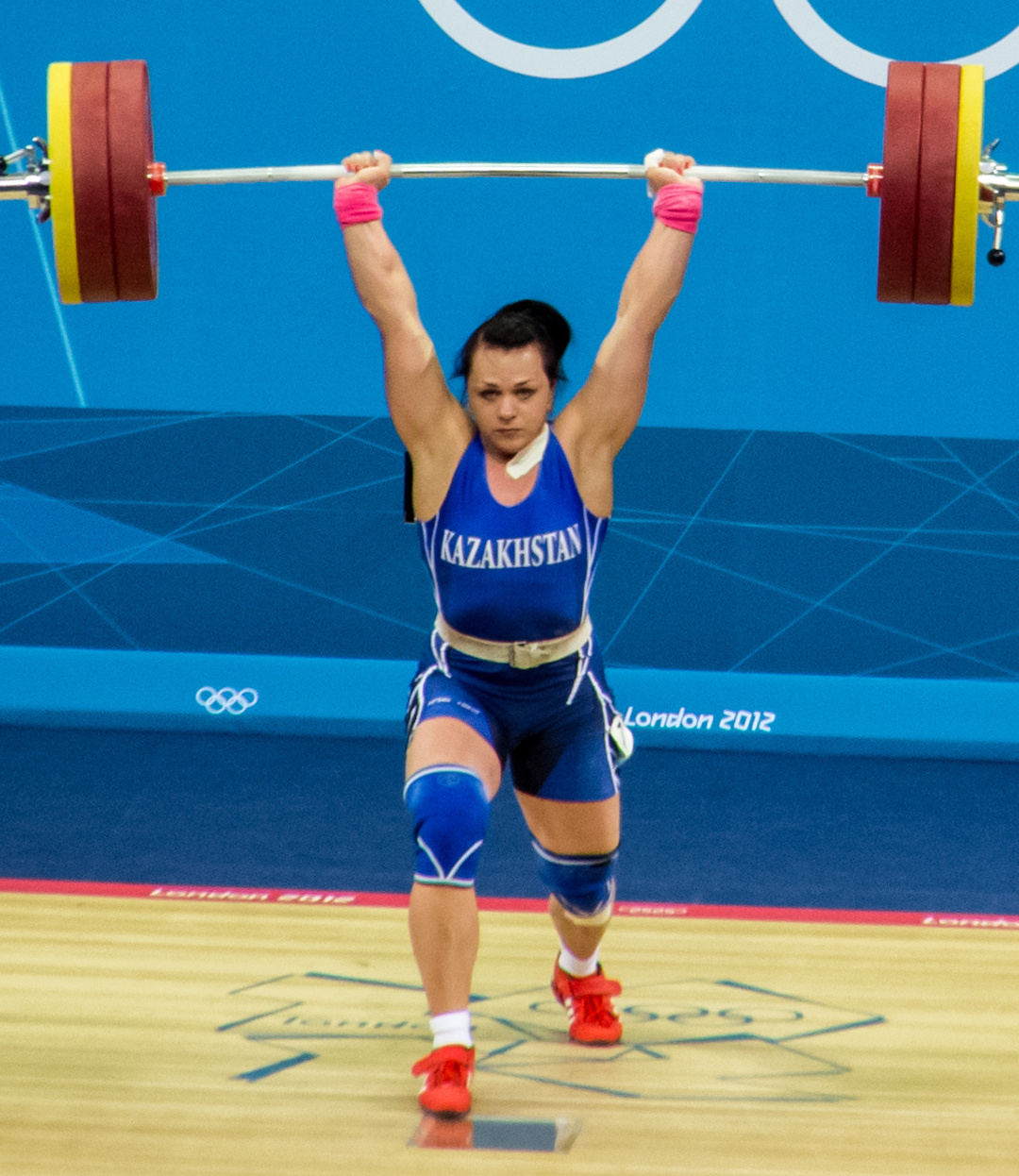
- Podobedova at the 2012 Summer Olympics

Personal information
- Full name: Svetlana Nikolayevna Podobedova
- Nationality: Russian; Kazakhstani
- Born: 25 May 1986 (age 40) Ziminsky District, Russian SFSR, Soviet Union
- Years active: 2003–
- Height: 1.65 m (5 ft 5 in)
- Weight: 75 kg (165 lb)
- Spouse: Vladimir Sedov

Sport
- Country: Russia (2000–2006); Kazakhstan (2006–)
- Sport: Olympic weightlifting
- Event: –75 kg
- Coached by: Pavel Blinov, Enver Turkileri, Alexey Ni

Achievements and titles
- Personal bests: Snatch: 134 kg (2010); Clean & jerk: 161 kg (2010); Total: 295 kg (2010)
Medal record
Representing Kazakhstan
Olympic Games
Disqualified	2012 London	–75 kg
World Championships
Gold medal – first place	2009 Goyang	–75 kg
Gold medal – first place	2010 Antalya	–75 kg
Silver medal – second place	2011 Paris	–75 kg
Asian Games
Gold medal – first place	2010 Guangzhou	–75 kg
Representing Russia
World Championships
Bronze medal – third place	2005 Doha	–75 kg
European Championships
Gold medal – first place	2004 Kyiv	–75 kg
Gold medal – first place	2005 Sofia	–75 kg
- Updated on 27 October 2016

Svetlana Podobedova (Russian: Светлана Подобедова; born May 25, 1986, Zima, Irkutsk) is a Russian-born Kazakhstani weightlifter.

== Career ==
Podobedova was awarded the gold medal at the 2012 Summer Olympics in the women's 75 kg category with a total of 291 kg. Her 161 kg clean and jerk was an Olympic record, and her 291 kg total tied the Olympic record set only minutes before by Natalia Zabolotnaya. She was awarded the medal by virtue of lighter bodyweight.

In June 2016, following the Russian doping scandal, the IWF announced that IOC's reanalyses of samples from the 2012 Beijing Olympics indicated that Podobedova had tested positive for prohibited substances, namely Stanazolol. The IWF imposed mandatory provisional suspension on her and eight other Olympians, including six medalists for Beijing doping. If confirmed, she faced losing her Olympic medal, and all results and medals earned from the date of the sample in 2012 to 2016. In October 2016, she was stripped of her Olympic medal. Zabolotnaya and the bronze medalist, Iryna Kulesha, were disqualified and stripped of their medals as well.
