= Lim Ji-hye =

South Korean weightlifter

Lim Ji-Hye (Korean: 임지혜; born 28 October 1985) is a South Korean weightlifter. She competed at the 2012 Summer Olympics in the -75 kg event. Lim was born in Cheorwon, South Korea.
