= Monika Devi =

Indian weightlifter

Laishram Monika Devi (born 1 March 1983) is an Indian weightlifter from Manipur who won the silver medal in the Women's 69 kg category at the 2006 Commonwealth Games. Monika was originally part of the Indian squad for the 2008 Summer Olympics in women's 68 kg category but had been dropped after the Weightlifting Federation stated that she had tested positive in a dope test. The Prime Minister's Office overruled this decision. Because the final list of participants had already been submitted to the Olympics officials, Monika could not take part in the Games.

== 2010 Commonwealth Games ==
After being cleared of doping charges, Monika competed in the Women's 69 kg category at the 2010 Commonwealth Games where she won a bronze medal.

== Controversy about doping and subsequent omission from Olympics ==
The Weightlifting Federation stated that Monika had tested positive in a dope test conducted in India prior to the Olympics. Subsequently, she was omitted from the Indian squad for the 2008 Summer Olympics in Beijing. She protested, stating that the officials had been trying to discard her in favour of another weightlifter Shailaja Pujari. Because the statement from the Federation lacked any credibility, the Prime Minister's Office intervened and approved her participation in the Olympics. With the list of participants already having been submitted to the Olympic authorities, the Indian Olympic Association stated that Monika could not take part in the Olympics. Thus, she was omitted from the Indian contingent.

In March 2009, Press Trust of India (PTI) reported that Monika's B sample, which was sent to a WADA-accredited laboratory in Tokyo, had also returned positive. The report indicated that she could be banned for two years. Monika reacted to this news by saying that she did absolutely nothing wrong. She alleged that there is a huge conspiracy to end her sporting career prematurely. Later, her family accused PTI of reporting incorrect information regarding the B sample result. A family member stated that Monika had not received any such reports yet.
