= Damaris Aguirre =

Mexican weightlifter (born 1977)

Personal information
- Full name: Damaris Gabriela Aguirre Aldaz
- Nationality: Mexico
- Born: 25 July 1977 (age 49) Chihuahua, Chihuahua, Mexico
- Height: 1.63 m (5 ft 4 in)
- Weight: 75 kg (165 lb)

Sport
- Sport: Weightlifting
- Event: 75 kg
Medal record
Women's weightlifting
Representing Mexico
Olympic Games
Bronze medal – third place	2008 Beijing	75 kg
Pan American Games
Silver medal – second place	2007 Rio de Janeiro	75 kg

Damaris Gabriela Aguirre Aldaz (born 25 July 1977 in Chihuahua, Chihuahua) is a Mexican former weightlifter. She won a silver medal for the 75 kg class at the 2007 Pan American Games in Rio de Janeiro, Brazil, with a total of 240 kilograms.

Aguirre made her official debut for the 2004 Summer Olympics in Athens, where she competed for the women's heavyweight category (75 kg). She finished only in twelfth place by 7.5 kilograms short of her record from El Salvador's Eva Dimas, with a total of 222.5 kg (100 in the snatch and 122.5 in the clean and jerk).

At the 2008 Summer Olympics in Beijing, Aguirre qualified for the second time in the women's 75 kg class, by obtaining a place from the 2007 World Weightlifting Championships in Chiang Mai, Thailand. Aguirre placed sixth in this event, as she successfully lifted 109 kg in the single-motion snatch, and hoisted 136 kg in the two-part, shoulder-to-overhead clean and jerk, for a total of 245 kg.

Due to doping offences of other athletes found in 2016 she became Olympic bronze medallist from Beijing 2008.
