= Iryna Kulesha =

Belarusian weightlifter

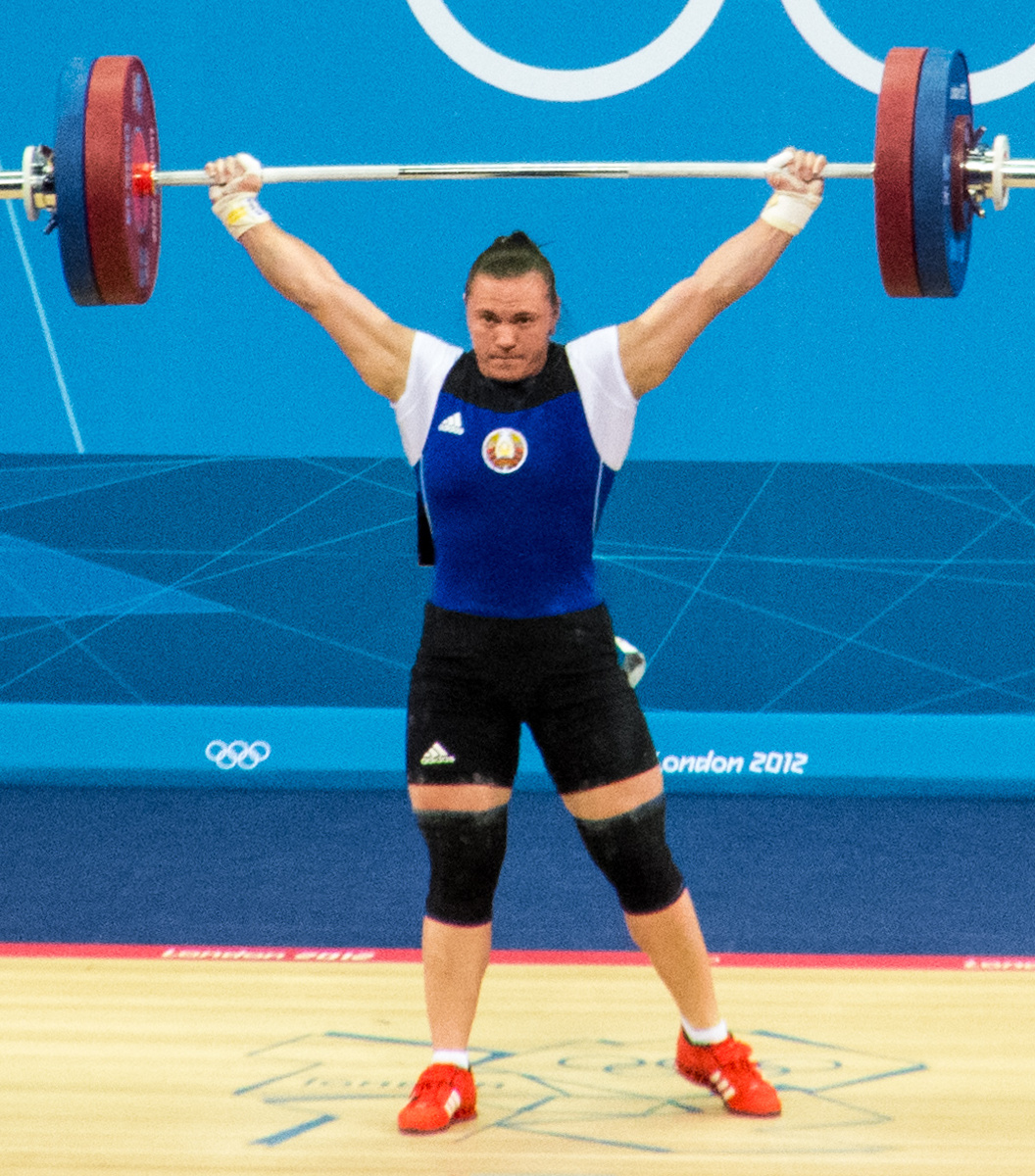
- Kulesha in 2012

Personal information
- Full name: Iryna Mikhailovna Kulesha
- Nationality: Belarus
- Born: 26 June 1986 (age 39) Brest, Belarus
- Height: 5 ft 4 in (163 cm)
- Weight: 165 lb (75 kg)
Medal record
Women's Weightlifting
Representing Belarus
Olympic Games
Disqualified	2012 London	– 75 kg
World Championships
Bronze medal – third place	2011 Paris	75 kg (snatch)

Iryna Mikhailauna Kulesha (Belarusian: Ірына Міхайлаўна Кулеша, born 26 June 1986 in Brest, Belarus or in Oberovshina) is a Belarusian weightlifter.

== Career ==
Kulesha originally won an Olympic bronze medal in the under 75 kg weight category at the 2012 Summer Olympics. She was coached by Viktor Shilay. On 21 November 2016, the IOC disqualified six medal winners in weightlifting for failing doping tests at the 2012 Games, including Kulesha, who was stripped of her medal.

Four days earlier, on 17 November 2016, the IOC had disqualified Kulesha from the 2008 Olympic Games and struck her results from the record for failing a drugs test in a re-analysis of her doping sample from 2008.
